= The Simpsons season 8 =

Season of television series

The Simpsons
- Season 8
- DVD cover featuring the Simpson family (Maggie, Homer, Bart, Marge, Lisa, Santa's Little Helper and Snowball II)
- Showrunners: Bill Oakley; Josh Weinstein (23 episodes); Al Jean; Mike Reiss (2 episodes)
- No. of episodes: 25

Release
- Original network: Fox
- Original release: October 27, 1996 – May 18, 1997

Season chronology
- ← Previous; Season 7 Next → Season 9

The eighth season of the American animated sitcom The Simpsons aired on Fox between October 27, 1996, and May 18, 1997. It began with "Treehouse of Horror VII". The showrunners for the eighth production season were Bill Oakley and Josh Weinstein, while the season was produced by Gracie Films and 20th Century Fox Television. The broadcast season contained two episodes with 3F-series production codes, indicating that were hold-over episodes from the seventh production season, and two episodes with 3G-series production codes, which have never been explicitly confirmed to be part of any specific production season (but are speculated to be relabeled 3F-series episodes).

The DVD box set was released in Region 1 on August 15, 2006, Region 2 on October 2, 2006, and Region 4 on September 27, 2006. The set was released in two different forms: a Maggie-shaped head to match the Homer and Marge shaped heads of the previous two sets and also a standard rectangular shaped box. Like the seventh season box set, both versions are available for sale separately.

== Voice cast & characters ==
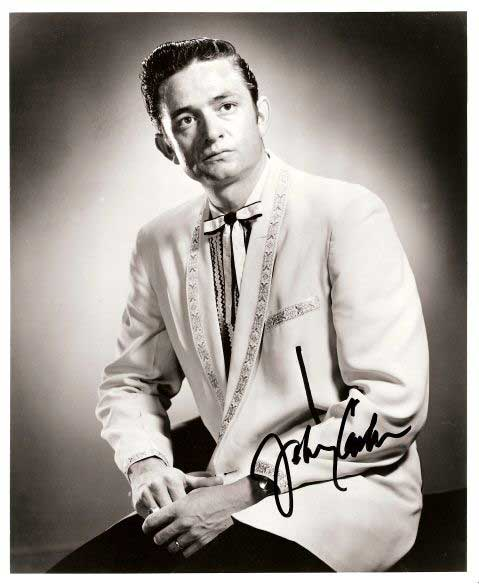
Johnny Cash guest-starred as the Space Coyote in the episode "El Viaje Misterioso de Nuestro Jomer (The Mysterious Voyage of Homer)". Cash has been named by several critics as one of the best guest voices in The Simpsons history.

=== Main cast ===
- Dan Castellaneta as Homer Simpson, Kodos, Blue-Haired Lawyer, Barney Gumble, Bumblebee Man, Krusty the Clown, Sideshow Mel, Mayor Quimby, Grampa Simpson, Hans Moleman, Groundskeeper Willie, Louie, Itchy, Poochie, Mr. Prince, Santa's Little Helper, and various others
- Julie Kavner as Marge Simpson, Selma Bouvier, Patty Bouvier and various others
- Nancy Cartwright as Bart Simpson, Nelson Muntz, Kearney, Ralph Wiggum, Kearney Junior, Rod Flanders, Todd Flanders, Database, Maggie Simpson, Wendell Borton and various others
- Yeardley Smith as Lisa Simpson
- Hank Azaria as Professor Frink, Apu, Moe Szyslak, Comic Book Guy, Dr. Nick Riviera, Snake Jailbird, Captain McCallister, Chief Wiggum, Superintendent Chalmers, Carl Carlson, Lou, Kirk Van Houten, Disco Stu, Cletus Spuckler, Bumblebee Man, Doug, Akira Kurosawa, Frank Grimes and various others
- Harry Shearer as Dr. Hibbert, Principal Skinner, Kang, Kent Brockman, Waylon Smithers, Otto Mann, Ned Flanders, Reverend Lovejoy, Mr. Burns, Lenny Leonard, Eddie, Rainier Wolfcastle, Jasper Beardsley, Dewey Largo, Nedward Flanders, Sr., Scratchy, Judge Snyder and various others

=== Recurring ===
- Pamela Hayden as Milhouse Van Houten, Jimbo Jones, Janey Powell, Dolph and various others
- Tress MacNeille as Agnes Skinner, Belle, Brandine Spuckler, Sarah Wiggum, Luann Van Houten, Dolph, Mrs. Glick and various others
- Maggie Roswell as Helen Lovejoy, Martha Quimby, Luann Van Houten, Maude Flanders, Capri Flanders, Miss Hoover, Shary Bobbins and various others
- Russi Taylor as Martin Prince, Sherri and Terri and Uter Zorker

=== Guest stars ===
- Phil Hartman as Bill Clinton and Troy McClure (3 episodes)
- Joe Mantegna as Fat Tony (2 episodes)
- Marcia Wallace as Edna Krabappel (4 episodes)
- Frank Welker as Santa's Little Helper, Laddie, Baboons and various animals (3 episodes)
- Albert Brooks (credited as A. Brooks) as Hank Scorpio ("You Only Move Twice")
- Sally Stevens as 'Scorpio' Singer and "People" (2 episodes; uncredited from "You Only Move Twice")
- Paul Winfield as Lucius Sweet ("The Homer They Fall")
- Michael Buffer as himself ("The Homer They Fall")
- Rodney Dangerfield as Larry Burns ("Burns, Baby Burns")
- Jon Lovitz as Jay Sherman ("Hurricane Neddy")
- Johnny Cash as the Space Coyote ("El Viaje Misterioso de Nuestro Jomer (The Mysterious Voyage of Homer)")
- Leonard Nimoy as himself ("The Springfield Files")
- Gillian Anderson as Dana Scully ("The Springfield Files")
- David Duchovny as Fox Mulder ("The Springfield Files")
- Jack Lemmon as Frank Ormand ("The Twisted World of Marge Simpson")
- Alex Rocco as Roger Meyers Jr. ("The Itchy & Scratchy & Poochie Show")
- John Waters as John ("Homer's Phobia")
- Kelsey Grammer as Sideshow Bob ("Brother from Another Series")
- David Hyde Pierce as Cecil Terwilliger and "Man in crowd" ("Brother from Another Series")
- Dave Thomas as Rex Banner ("Homer vs. the Eighteenth Amendment")
- Bret Hart as himself ("The Old Man and the Lisa")
- Sab Shimono as Mr. Sparkle ("In Marge We Trust")
- Gedde Watanabe as the Factory worker ("In Marge We Trust")
- Karen Maruyama and Denice Kumagai as dancers ("In Marge We Trust")
- Tim Conway as himself ("The Simpsons Spin-Off Showcase")
- Gailard Sartain as Charles "Big" Daddy ("The Simpsons Spin-Off Showcase")
- Willem Dafoe as the Commandant ("The Secret War of Lisa Simpson")

== Reception ==
Season eight received critical acclaim and won multiple awards, including two Emmy Awards: "Homer's Phobia" won for Outstanding Animated Program (for Programming One Hour or Less) in 1997, and Alf Clausen and Ken Keeler won for "Outstanding Individual Achievement in Music and Lyrics" with the song "We Put the Spring in Springfield" from the episode "Bart After Dark". Clausen also received an Emmy nomination for "Outstanding Music Direction" for "Simpsoncalifragilisticexpiala(Annoyed Grunt)cious". "Brother from Another Series" was nominated for the Emmy for "Sound Mixing For a Comedy Series or a Special". For "Homer's Phobia", Mike Anderson won the Annie Award for Best Individual Achievement: Directing in a TV Production, and the WAC Winner Best Director for Primetime Series at the 1998 World Animation Celebration. Gay & Lesbian Alliance Against Defamation awarded the episode the GLAAD Media Award for "Outstanding TV – Individual Episode". On Rotten Tomatoes, the eighth season of The Simpsons has a 100% approval rating based on 7 critical reviews.

== Episodes ==
No. overall	No. in season	Title	Directed by	Written by	Original release date	Prod. code	U.S. viewers (millions)
154	1	"Treehouse of Horror VII"	Mike B. Anderson	Ken Keeler	October 27, 1996	4F02	18.3
154	1	"Treehouse of Horror VII"	Mike B. Anderson	Dan Greaney	October 27, 1996	4F02	18.3
154	1	"Treehouse of Horror VII"	Mike B. Anderson	David X. Cohen	October 27, 1996	4F02	18.3
A Halloween special which is divided into three short stories: The Thing and I – Bart discovers he has an evil twin, who is living in the Simpsons' attic. The Genesis Tub – After intending to prove that sugary drinks will rot teeth, Lisa creates her own miniature universe. Citizen Kang – Kang and Kodos impersonate presidential candidates Bill Clinton and Bob Dole in order to invade Earth.
155	2	"You Only Move Twice"	Mike B. Anderson	John Swartzwelder	November 3, 1996	3F23	13.9
When Homer accepts a new job at the Globex Corporation the Simpson family moves to Cypress Creek. Homer enjoys his new work and his easy-going boss Hank Scorpio, but is completely unaware that Scorpio is an evil genius and that the company is a vehicle for international extortion. The rest of the family have trouble settling in Cypress Creek and begin to get homesick, so Homer must make a choice between Cypress Creek and Springfield.
156	3	"The Homer They Fall"	Mark Kirkland	Jonathan Collier	November 10, 1996	4F03	17.0
When Bart is beaten up by school bullies, Homer takes matters into his own hands. Although Homer is unable to make his point, Moe is impressed by his ability to withstand a beating. Moe talks Homer into becoming a boxer with Moe as his manager. His sole strategy is to let opponents knock themselves out while pounding on Homer. Promoter Lucius Sweet becomes aware of Homer's rise as a boxer and wants him to fight Drederick Tatum, the heavyweight champion.
157	4	"Burns, Baby Burns"	Jim Reardon	Ian Maxtone-Graham	November 17, 1996	4F05	12.6
A man named Larry is surprised when he sees his father, Mr. Burns, on a train from Yale to Springfield. Larry immediately follows the train. When he arrives at Mr Burns's mansion he identifies himself as Mr. Burns's long lost son. Burns admits that Larry is the result of a one-night stand and accepts him as his own. Soon, however, Larry proves to be an incurable oaf and Burns gets tired of him. Homer befriends Larry because they share similar interests. Together they fake Larry's kidnapping to win back Burns's love. But when Burns is told that Homer has kidnapped his son, Homer and Larry are chased by reporters and the police. When told of the fake kidnapping Burns cannot continue as Larry's father and Larry leaves Springfield to return to his family.
158	5	"Bart After Dark"	Dominic Polcino	Richard Appel	November 24, 1996	4F06	14.1
Bart does property damage to a house and Homer makes him do chores to pay for his misdeed. The house turns out to be a burlesque saloon and a group of concerned citizens confront Homer on Bart's work. Marge agrees with the group and joins them in their attempt to oust the saloon from Springfield. In a town hall meeting, Marge convinces the townspeople to demolish the old house, but when the destruction team begins, Homer sings a song that changes everybody's mind. The demolition stops, but Marge's bulldozer accidentally slips out of gear and damages the house.
159	6	"A Milhouse Divided"	Steven Dean Moore	Steve Tompkins	December 1, 1996	4F04	12.8
Marge decides to host a dinner party at the Simpson house. They invite their friends to it, but the Van Houtens have a very bad time and argue and fight throughout the night until Luann announces that she wants a divorce. Luann happily settles back to single life with Milhouse, and starts dating an American Gladiator named Pyro. Homer is confident that it will never happen to him, but Kirk tells him how quickly things can change. He realizes that he has taken his marriage for granted and overcompensates by smothering Marge. Deciding that their marriage is finished, Homer secretly files for a divorce from Marge. Homer then surprises her by asking her for her hand in marriage again and Marge accepts. Kirk tries the same strategy with Luann, but she refuses.
160	7	"Lisa's Date with Density"	Susie Dietter	Mike Scully	December 15, 1996	4F01	12.2
Nelson is punished for vandalizing Superintendent Chalmers' car and has to help Willie around the schoolyard. When Lisa watches Nelson torment Willie, she finds herself attracted to him and decides to try to change Nelson into a better person. Lisa goes on a date with him and they kiss, but when he is later revealed to be lying about vandalizing Skinner's house, she loses the attraction. Meanwhile, Homer finds an autodialer and starts a telemarketing scam.
161	8	"Hurricane Neddy"	Bob Anderson	Steve Young	December 29, 1996	4F07	14.36
A hurricane strikes through Springfield and spares the Simpsons' home, but destroys only the Flanders' home, forcing them to move into the church basement. The people of Springfield gather to rebuild their house, but when Ned sees the poor workmanship and their failure of rebuilding his house after inspecting their worksmanship, he has a complete breakdown, releasing out all of his long-awaited pent-up rage in front of everybody. Ned commits himself to a mental institution and his psychiatrist discovers that Ned's past has taught him to suppress his anger. The psychiatrist then teaches Ned to express his anger with Homer as a role model and Ned gets cured as Ned reunites with the people of Springfield along with the rest of the Simpsons and his family and tells everybody that the next time he does not like, they will hear about it.
162	9	"El Viaje Misterioso de Nuestro Jomer (The Mysterious Voyage of Homer)"	Jim Reardon	Ken Keeler	January 5, 1997	3F24	14.85
Homer begins to hallucinate after eating a dish laced with potent Guatemalan peppers at the chili cook-off. In this hallucination he meets a mystical coyote, which tells him to find his soul mate. After a fight with Marge, he is concerned that she is not really his soul mate. Homer leaves the house and seeks solitude in a lighthouse. Marge arrives at the lighthouse and apologizes and then Homer realizes that Marge is his soul mate after all.
163	10	"The Springfield Files"	Steven Dean Moore	Reid Harrison	January 12, 1997	3F25; 3G01	20.41
Homer walks home one night from Moe's Tavern. On his way he sees an eerie glowing creature. The next day Homer's story is printed in the local newspaper. FBI agents Mulder and Scully read the story and go to Springfield to investigate this X-file. After talking with Homer they find his credibility shaky and quickly leave again. Bart and Homer then set up a camp to videotape the creature. When the creature appears, Lisa reveals that the creature is actually Mr. Burns after a medical treatment by Dr. Nick. Guest stars: Leonard Nimoy, Gillian Anderson and David Duchovny
164	11	"The Twisted World of Marge Simpson"	Chuck Sheetz	Jennifer Crittenden	January 19, 1997	4F08	13.98
Marge starts a new pretzel franchise after being voted out of the Springfield Investorettes for being too conservative. The Investorettes see this and strike back by getting a falafel van. Homer helps Marge with her business by asking Fat Tony for assistance. Soon the orders pour while the falafel business mysteriously fails. Fat Tony attempts to collect all of Marge's profit, but she refuses. He then sends his goons to the Simpson house where he meets the Japanese mafia, who was sent by the Investorettes, and it ends in a showdown between the two mafias.
165	12	"Mountain of Madness"	Mark Kirkland	John Swartzwelder	February 2, 1997	4F10	17.49
To encourage teamwork, Mr. Burns takes all of his employees to a corporate retreat in the mountains. The employees pair up and Homer becomes Burns's partner. The challenge is to find a cabin on the snowy mountainside. The pair to finish last will be fired. Burns and Homer cheat by using a snowmobile and make it the cabin before everybody else, but an avalanche buries the cabin. Homer and Burns go insane in the cold and get into a fight. In the fight they ignite a propane tank, which rockets the cabin to safety.
166	13	"Simpsoncalifragilisticexpiala(Annoyed Grunt)cious"	Chuck Sheetz	Al Jean & Mike Reiss	February 7, 1997	3F27; 3G03	9.10
Marge is stressed by the demands of motherhood and the Simpsons get a magical British nanny, who floats down from the sky holding an umbrella. The nanny is a miracle worker, who teaches Bart and Lisa how to clean and charms everybody. However, the Simpsons cannot stop living their messy ways and the nanny's spirit gets crushed. She leaves the family realizing that she has taught them nothing.
167	14	"The Itchy & Scratchy & Poochie Show"	Steven Dean Moore	David X. Cohen	February 9, 1997	4F12	15.67
A new character, Poochie, is added to The Itchy & Scratchy Show as an attempt to boost failing ratings. Bart and Lisa convince Homer to audition for the voice of Poochie. He gets the part and makes public appearances with the voice actor behind Itchy and Scratchy. Poochie's debut is not well received and the producers decide to kill him off. Homer refuses to cooperate and records a different version of the death scene. Homer is convinced that he managed to keep Poochie, but when the episode airs, the character is edited out.
168	15	"Homer's Phobia"	Mike B. Anderson	Ron Hauge	February 16, 1997	4F11	15.26
The family tries to sell an old heirloom at a collectibles store and strike up a relationship with John, the store owner. The Simpsons invite John over to their house to assess their other belongings and Homer takes a liking to him. Marge then informs Homer that John is gay and he refuses to see him again. Afterwards, Homer notices changes in Bart's behavior and fears that John has turned him into a homosexual. Trying to make Bart manlier, they go on a hunting trip, but get attacked by a herd of aggressive reindeer. Suddenly, John arrives and saves the day. Homer then thanks John for saving his life and accepts him as a friend.
169	16	"Brother from Another Series"	Pete Michels	Ken Keeler	February 23, 1997	4F14	15.07
Sideshow Bob is released from prison and his brother, Cecil, hires him to supervise the construction of a dam. Bart suspects that Bob is up to something and sneaks into his office along with Lisa. There he discovers a suitcase filled with money. Bob enters and explains his innocence, but Bart and Lisa do not believe him. Cecil now enters and holds them all at gunpoint. His plan is to blow up the dam and walk away with the $15 million he embezzled from the project. Bob would naturally be blamed allowing Cecil to get revenge for Bob stealing his part as Krusty's sidekick. Cecil now locks up Bob, Bart and Lisa, but they manage to escape and stop Cecil.
170	17	"My Sister, My Sitter"	Jim Reardon	Dan Greaney	March 2, 1997	4F13	15.10
Lisa wants to start babysitting, but Marge thinks she is too young. Flanders urgently needs a babysitter and Lisa gets her first job. When Flanders gives her a glowing review, she starts to get steady work. Then one evening, Lisa is put in charge of babysitting Bart and Maggie. Bart is outraged and embarks on a series of pranks. When Bart refuses to go to bed, Lisa accidentally knocks him down the stairs which dislocates his arm. Lisa tries to help him by transporting him in a wheelbarrow to Dr. Nick. Bart falls out of the wheelbarrow and rolls down a hill. The townspeople are mortified, but Lisa continues to get jobs the following day.
171	18	"Homer vs. the Eighteenth Amendment"	Bob Anderson	John Swartzwelder	March 16, 1997	4F15	14.60
Alcohol is banned (thanks to a pre-existing law) from Springfield after Bart accidentally gets drunk at a town parade. Rex Banner is appointed to replace Chief Wiggum as police chief to enforce the new laws and stop Fat Tony from smuggling. Rex is successful, but then Homer starts to smuggle alcohol. Eventually, Homer ends his bootlegging and approaches Wiggum with a plan to expose himself and restore Wiggum's good name. Homer is about to receive punishment by being catapulted, but he is saved by an impassioned speech by Marge. The liquor ban's repeal is then revealed and the town celebrates by getting drunk.
172	19	"Grade School Confidential"	Susie Dietter	Rachel Pulido	April 6, 1997	4F09	13.27
Seymour Skinner and Edna Krabappel strike up a conversation at a party and take a romantic interest in each other. They try to keep their affair a secret, but Bart sees them kiss. The following day the couple hears Bart telling his classmates about it and silences him by deleting his permanent records. Bart becomes their go-between for exchanging love notes, but he gets tired of that and exposes Skinner and Krabappel in the janitor's closet locked in a passionate embrace. The word spreads all over town and Superintendent Chalmers gives Skinner an ultimatum – either end the relationship or face dismissal. Skinner admits that he is in fact a virgin and the matter is cleared up.
173	20	"The Canine Mutiny"	Dominic Polcino	Ron Hauge	April 13, 1997	4F16	13.25 7.9 (HH) (Note: (HH) denotes that the numbers listed are the number of households the episode was viewed in.)
Bart gets a credit card and buys a well trained new dog called Laddie. When Bart could not pay the balance on the credit card the bank repossesses Laddie. Instead of giving them Laddie, Bart gives the repo men Santa's Little Helper. Feeling guilty, Bart gives Laddie to the police and sets out to find Santa's Little Helper and finds him at a blind man's house. Bart tries to kidnap his dog, but instead the blind man alerts the police. When they arrive, Laddie, who is now a police dog, sniffs out a bag of marijuana and the blind man gets arrested. Bart can then leave with Santa's Little Helper.
174	21	"The Old Man and the Lisa"	Mark Kirkland	John Swartzwelder	April 20, 1997	4F17	13.97
Mr. Burns loses his fortune in a bad investment. He is not doing well alone and is committed to the Springfield Retirement Castle. Disgusted by his surroundings, he vows to get his fortune back. He then sees Lisa collecting recyclables and remembers her opposition towards him. He believes that the reason for losing his fortune was that he was surrounded by "yes men" and therefore asks Lisa to help him. Lisa introduces Burns to recycling and by collecting these he soon gets enough money to buy a recycling plant. In reality this recycling plant captures all aquatic life and grinds it into all-purpose goo. Lisa is horrified, but Burns regains his fortune and buys back his power plant.
175	22	"In Marge We Trust"	Steven Dean Moore	Donick Cary	April 27, 1997	4F18	16.93
Marge is concerned that Reverend Lovejoy does not meet the needs of his parishioners and becomes the new advice giver at the Church. When Marge gains a loyal following, Lovejoy gets concerned that he has become "shepherd without a flock". Meanwhile, Homer finds an old Japanese product, "Mr. Sparkle", a dish-washing detergent, with a logo that oddly resembles him. When he calls up the company behind the product, he finds Mr. Sparkle is a composite of two company logos. Marge is unable to help Ned Flanders in a crisis and calls up Lovejoy for help. Lovejoy solves the crisis and gets his congregants' interest in his next sermon telling the story.
176	23	"Homer's Enemy"	Jim Reardon	John Swartzwelder	May 4, 1997	4F19	11.80
Frank Grimes, a new employee at the Nuclear Power Plant, is a hard-working man who has never been given a break in his life. At work, he meets Homer and takes an instant dislike to his poor job performance and attitude. Homer tries to win Grimes' approval by inviting him over for a family dinner. When Grimes sees Homer's accomplishments and home, he becomes even more bitter. When an attempt to humiliate Homer backfires, Grimes ends up Imitating Homer's behavior at work. As he runs amok, he sees high voltage wires and electrocutes himself. Meanwhile, Bart steps into a tax auction and buys an abandoned factory for a dollar, which he uses to play factory with Milhouse.
177	24	"The Simpsons Spin-Off Showcase"	Neil Affleck	Story by : Ken Keeler; Teleplay by : David X. Cohen	May 11, 1997	4F20	11.57
177	24	"The Simpsons Spin-Off Showcase"	Neil Affleck	Story by : Ken Keeler; Teleplay by : Dan Greaney	May 11, 1997	4F20	11.57
177	24	"The Simpsons Spin-Off Showcase"	Neil Affleck	Story by : Ken Keeler; Teleplay by : Steve Tompkins	May 11, 1997	4F20	11.57
Troy McClure hosts a show which features three ideas for spin-offs to The Simpsons: Chief Wiggum, P.I. – Chief Wiggum and Seymour Skinner are detectives in New Orleans. The Love-Matic Grampa – Grampa's soul is contained in Moe's Love Tester machine. The Simpson Family Smile-Time Variety Hour – The Simpsons host a 70s variety show.
178	25	"The Secret War of Lisa Simpson"	Mike B. Anderson	Richard Appel	May 18, 1997	4F21	12.69
Bart is enrolled in a military school after unintentionally pranking the whole town. After seeing the school, Lisa decides she wants to join too. Lisa is the first female cadet and therefore gets to stay in her own private barracks. This move creates resentment among the boys at the facility and Bart refuses to speak to his sister. Later, Bart secretly apologizes and helps her train for a test. When Lisa has trouble completing the test, Bart publicly encourages her at the expense of his own reputation, and she finally passes it.

== Home media ==
The Simpsons season 8 DVD digipak, special Maggie head edition

The DVD box set for season eight was released by 20th Century Fox Home Entertainment in the United States and Canada on August 15, 2006, nine years after it had completed broadcast on television. As well as every episode from the season, the DVD release features bonus material including deleted scenes, Animatics, and commentaries for every episode. As with the previous season, the set was released in two different packagings: a "Collector's Edition" plastic packaging molded to look like Maggie's head, and a standard rectangular cardboard box featuring Maggie looking through a photo album while the rest of the Simpsons family are taking a picture. The menus continue the same format from the previous three seasons, and the overall theme is various characters posing for photographs.

The Complete Eighth Season
Set Details			Special Features
25 episodes; 4-disc set; 1.33:1 aspect ratio; AUDIO; English 5.1 Dolby Digital; Spanish 2.0 Dolby Surround; French 2.0 Dolby Surround; SUBTITLES; English SDH; Spanish			Optional commentaries for all 25 episodes; Introduction from Matt Groening; Deleted Scenes; You Only Move Twice; The Homer They Fall; Burns, Baby Burns; A Milhouse Divided; Lisa's Date with Density; Hurricane Neddy; The Springfield Files; The Twisted World of Marge Simpson; Mountain of Madness; Simpsoncalifragilisticexpiala(Annoyed Grunt)cious; The Itchy & Scratchy & Poochie Show; Homer's Phobia; The Brother from Another Series; My Sister, My Sitter; Homer vs. the Eighteenth Amendment; Grade School Confidential; The Canine Mutiny; The Old Man and the Lisa; In Marge We Trust; The Simpsons Spin-Off Showcase; The Secret War of Lisa Simpson; Special Language Feature; Homer's Enemy; Czech 2.0 Dolby Surround; Japanese 2.0 Dolby Surround; German 2.0 Dolby Surround; French (France) 2.0 Dolby Surround; Featurette: "The Simpsons House"; Animation showcases; Treehouse of Horror VII; In Marge We Trust; The Secret War of Lisa Simpson; Illustrated Commentaries; Treehouse of Horror VII; Homer vs. the Eighteenth Amendment; Lisa's Date with Density; The Secret War of Lisa Simpson; Original sketches; Promotional spots featuring Matt Groening
Release Dates
Region 1	Region 2	Region 4	
August 15, 2006	October 2, 2006	September 27, 2006	

== See also ==
- List of The Simpsons episodes
