= Brother from Another Series =

- The Simpsons episode
- Sideshow Bob with his brother Cecil
- Episode no.: Season 8 Episode 16
- Directed by: Pete Michels
- Written by: Ken Keeler
- Production code: 4F14
- Original air date: February 23, 1997

Guest appearances
- Kelsey Grammer as Sideshow Bob; David Hyde Pierce as Cecil Terwilliger and "Man in crowd"

Episode features
- Couch gag: The living room is on the ceiling. The Simpsons sit down, but fall to the "floor" (the ceiling).
- Commentary: Matt Groening; Josh Weinstein; Ken Keeler; Kelsey Grammer; Pete Michels

Episode chronology
← Previous "Homer's Phobia"	Next → "My Sister, My Sitter"
- The Simpsons season 8

"Brother from Another Series" is the sixteenth episode of the eighth season of the American animated television series The Simpsons. It originally aired on the Fox network in the United States on February 23, 1997. Sideshow Bob is released from prison after his arrest in "Sideshow Bob's Last Gleaming" into the care of his brother Cecil and claims to be a changed man. However, Bart does not believe Bob and tries to find out what he's up to. It was written by Ken Keeler and was the first episode directed by Pete Michels. The episode guest stars Kelsey Grammer in his sixth appearance as Sideshow Bob and David Hyde Pierce in his first appearance as Cecil. The title is not only a play on the movie The Brother from Another Planet (used for a previous episode as well), but also references the fact that Grammer and Pierce previously played bickering brothers Frasier (Note: Frasier, along with several other characters from Cheers, briefly appeared in the episode "Fear of Flying", though he remained silent rather than being voiced by Grammer, who was unavailable.) and Niles Crane on the sitcom Frasier. (Note: Original run (1993-2004) only; while Grammer returned for the revived run (2023-2024), Pierce did not.)

== Plot ==
While performing live from Springfield Prison, Krusty the Clown encounters Sideshow Bob. Bob talks about the crimes he has committed in the past, including framing Krusty for armed robbery, attempting to kill Selma Bouvier, and attempting to kill Bart Simpson as revenge for Bart exposing Bob's framing of Krusty and foiling his plan to kill Selma. Bob is later declared a changed man by Reverend Lovejoy and leaves prison on a work-release program, despite Bart's insistence that Bob is still a homicidal maniac. Bob is taken into the care of his brother, Cecil; they have not seen each other in ten years. Cecil is Springfield's chief hydrological and hydrodynamical engineer, and he employs Bob to supervise the construction of a hydroelectric dam in a river near the town. Bart, believing Bob is still plotting his murder, follows Bob's every move. Bob — annoyed by Bart's intrusions and the dam's incompetent laborers, including Cletus — expresses his desire to see the dam burst and obliterate Springfield.

While searching Bob's trailer at the dam construction site, Bart and Lisa discover a briefcase full of cash. When confronted with the money, Bob denies knowing about it, stating the finances were used to put concrete in the dam's walls. However, the walls turn out to be hollow and poorly constructed. Cecil arrives — pointing a gun at Bart, Lisa, and Bob — and reveals his own intention to embezzle the money from the project, and his plans to frame Bob as the scapegoat when the dam collapses from shoddy construction. Cecil's motivation for the crime is being upstaged at his audition as Krusty's sidekick ten years prior by Bob, who was chosen as the clown's sidekick instead, despite Bob having no interest in the job. Cecil locks Bob, Bart and Lisa in the dam and prepares to blow it up, taking the money with him.

Deciding to work together, Bart, Lisa, and Bob escape and try to save the dam. While Lisa and Bob defuse Cecil's dynamite, Bart lunges at Cecil before he can press the plunger. Cecil attempts to swat him off with the briefcase, which falls open and scatters money over the river below, washing it away. Cecil throws Bart off a cliff, but Bob grabs the dynamite's cord and swoops down to save him. As the two dangle over the side of the dam, Bob cuts the cord on the dynamite to prevent Cecil from destroying the town. Bart and Bob plummet down the dam's wall, but a protruding pipe stops their fall.

The police arrive and arrest Cecil. Bob gloats over his victory, having gained the respect of Bart and Lisa, but Chief Wiggum believes Bob was complicit in the crime and arrests him. As they are taken away, Cecil tricks Bob into swearing revenge and incriminating himself. The dam then crumbles and releases a torrent of water on Springfield, but does only minimal damage. Cecil and Bob are put in a jail cell together, which leaves both men miserable.

== Production ==
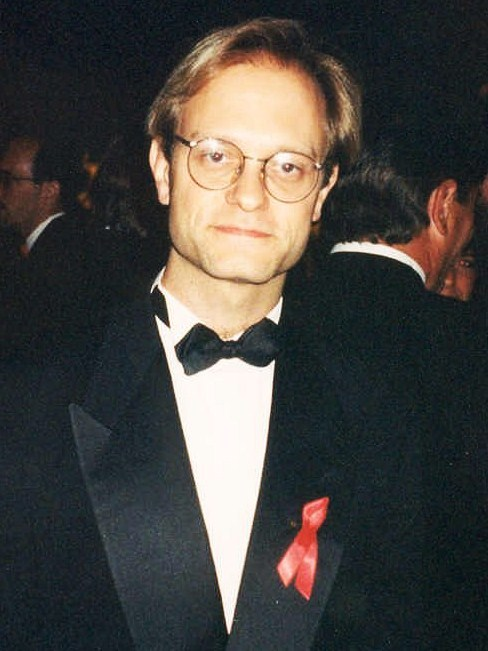
David Hyde Pierce

The episode was written by Ken Keeler, who had been watching a lot of Frasier episodes at the time and had been assigned to write a Sideshow Bob episode, so he thought it would be a good idea to mix the two together. David Hyde Pierce was cast as Sideshow Bob's brother, prompting him to joke, "Normally, I would not do something like this. But how often do you get a chance to work with an actor like Kelsey Grammer and, more importantly, play his brother?" While Sideshow Bob is addressing the crowd, a man near the back raises his hand and says "Probably!"; he is also voiced by Pierce, who had wanted to be a man in a crowd.

An early draft of the episode featured an opera house explosion, though this was changed because the writers felt that using a dam would be more exciting. An early rule of Sideshow Bob episodes was to recap the events of previous episodes in case viewers had forgotten who he was. Keeler consulted with the Frasier producers to make sure they were okay with the script, but they demanded that a very brief scene in which Cecil talks to a visible character and refers to her as "Maris" (referring to Maris Crane, an unseen character from the show itself) be removed. The writers spent a long time trying to figure out a civilization that considered chief hydrological engineering their true calling; they ultimately chose the Cappadocians, who were famous for underground cities, though not specifically dams.

Cecil was drawn to resemble Pierce, but also to look similar to Bob. According to director Pete Michels, it was difficult to draw Bob and Cecil standing together because their feet are both so big. There was a deleted scene featuring Hans Moleman outside his house on the base of the dam being showered with Cecil's embezzled money believing it to be from God, though his house can still briefly be seen in the final episode, specifically the scene where Cecil throws Bart off the dam side. The sequence was cut in order to make room for the explanation of why Bob was sent back to prison. Ken Keeler has said that it is his favorite deleted scene.

== Cultural references ==
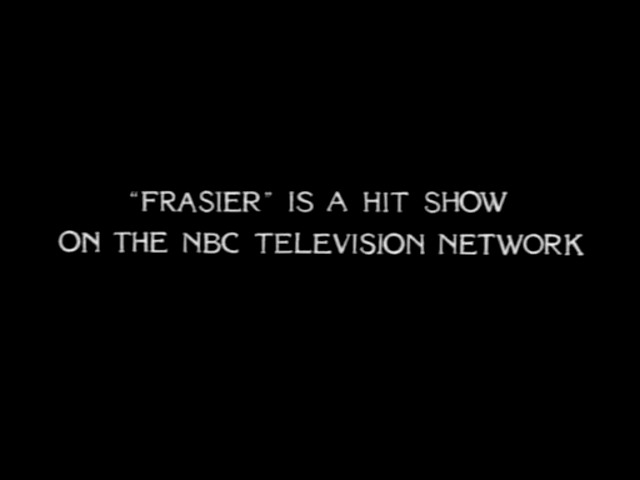
The Frasier-style title card which featured in the episode.

The "Krusty the Clown Prison Special" is based on Johnny Cash's 1968 appearance at Folsom State Prison; Krusty's song is likewise a parody of Cash's "Folsom Prison Blues". The mention of Arthur Fiedler's wake is an apparent reference to Frasier Crane's upper class Seattle lifestyle. A title card just before the start of the second act reads "'FRASIER' IS A HIT SHOW ON THE NBC TELEVISION NETWORK" in a similar typeface and style as Frasier's intertitles, with jazz music playing over it as it does in the series. When Bart jumps on Cecil, covering his eyes and asks "guess who?", Cecil responds with "Maris?". Cecil's inability to see Bart also refers to the fact that Maris, Niles' wife in Frasier, is never actually seen.

== Reception ==
In its original broadcast, "Brother from Another Series" finished 39th in ratings for the week of February 17–23, 1997, with a Nielsen rating of 9.1, equivalent to approximately 8.8 million viewing households. It was the fourth highest-rated show on Fox that week, following The X-Files, King of the Hill and Melrose Place.

Beforehand, the media said the episode "look[ed] promising", and afterwards journalist Ben Rayner called it one of director Peter Michels' "classics". This episode was nominated for a Primetime Emmy Award for Sound Mixing for a Comedy Series or Special. In a 2008 article, Entertainment Weekly named Pierce's role as Cecil as one of the sixteen best guest appearances on The Simpsons. Grammer and Pierce were ranked second on AOL's list of their favorite 25 Simpsons guest stars.
