= Hurricane Neddy =

- The Simpsons episode
- Ned Flanders lashing out at everyone after the latter's attempt to rebuild the Flanders house backfires.
- Episode no.: Season 8 Episode 8
- Directed by: Bob Anderson
- Written by: Steve Young
- Production code: 4F07
- Original air date: December 29, 1996

Guest appearance
- Jon Lovitz as Jay Sherman

Episode features
- Couch gag: The couch is replaced with a coin slot and the words "Vend-A-Couch" appear on the wall. After Homer inserts a coin and nothing happens, he pounds on the wall and the couch lands on him.
- Commentary: Josh Weinstein; Steve Young; George Meyer; Bob Anderson

Episode chronology
← Previous "Lisa's Date with Density"	Next → "El Viaje Misterioso de Nuestro Jomer (The Mysterious Voyage of Homer)"
- The Simpsons season 8

"Hurricane Neddy" is the eighth episode of the eighth season of the American animated television series The Simpsons. It originally aired on Fox in the United States on December 29, 1996. It was written by Steve Young, directed by Bob Anderson and features a cameo by Jon Lovitz as Jay Sherman from The Critic. In the episode, a violent hurricane strikes Springfield. By pure chance, the only building destroyed is the Flanders home. As a result, Ned begins to lose his faith in God and the townspeople around him, especially Homer, leading him to a nervous breakdown.

== Plot ==
As Hurricane Barbara approaches Springfield, panicked citizens ransack the Kwik-E-Mart. After the storm, the Simpsons leave their basement to find their home unscathed. However their neighbor, Ned Flanders, emerges from a heap of rubble to find his house destroyed, forcing the Flanders to take shelter in the church basement after becoming homeless. Their house is uninsured, as Ned regards insurance as a form of gambling. He is further discouraged after learning that his business, The Leftorium, was looted after the storm. Distraught, he asks Rev. Lovejoy if God is punishing him despite his strict adherence to his faith.

Marge surprises the Flanders with a new home, which the residents of Springfield have built. However, when the Flanders enter, they notice that the interior has a loose nail sticking out of one of the living room walls, a toilet bowl in the kitchen, a load-bearing Krusty the Clown poster in Rod and Todd's bedroom, oddly-shaped doorframes, electrical buildup in the power room, a painted dirt floor, and a tapering hallway to the master bedroom, which has a cat-sized door.

When Homer leans on the front door, the house immediately collapses. Overwhelmed and dismayed, Ned tries to clean his glasses, but one of the lenses pops off and breaks. Driven over the edge and finally pushed too far, he attempts to calm himself down, knowing that the residents of Springfield had done their best, but is unable to control his emotions and has an angry meltdown, calling out and ridiculing several people for their flaws and issues that he has with them.

Worried by his outburst, he voluntarily commits himself to Calmwood Mental Hospital. He is visited by his childhood psychiatrist, Dr. Foster, who recalls Ned's childhood as an out-of-control brat raised by beatnik parents. Due to his parents refusing to apply discipline, as they feared that doing so would have brought a conflict of interest for their lifestyle, Ned's treatment, the University of Minnesota Spankalogical Protocol, involved eight months of continuous spanking by Foster. Although it cured Ned of his bratty behavior, it rendered him unable to express his anger and resulted in his trademark nonsensical jabbering at moments when he was close to losing his temper. This caused him to unknowingly repress his anger until it built up inside of him and erupted in the form of his uncontrollable tirade of berating at the residents of Springfield.

Foster enlists Homer to help Ned express his anger due to their mutual dislike. Homer uses several scripted insults to help him vent out his anger copiously, but he still retains his nonsensical speech and his jovial facade. Homer disparages his apparent like of everything, to which he admits that he dislikes the post office's lack of customer services and his parents due to their lack of discipline. Hearing this, Foster declares him cured.

Outside of the hospital, Ned is greeted by the residents of Springfield. He promises to acknowledge when they offend him, and adds that he will run them down with his car if they anger him. Homer playfully remarks that Ned is crazy, and Ned winks.

== Production ==
A scene from the episode, featuring a sign reading "Free John Swartzwelder", referencing one of the series' writers

Steve Young, a writer for the Late Show with David Letterman, was brought in as a freelance writer to write the episode. The writers wanted to explore what made Ned Flanders tick and examine what made him act the way he does. The original idea came from George Meyer, who had also wanted an episode about Flanders' faith being tested. One of the key story points came from his friend Jack Handey, a writer for Saturday Night Live, who wanted to do a sketch about a down-on-his-luck shoemaker who is visited by elves who help him, but make very bad shoes. Likewise, it inspired the idea that the neighbors would rebuild Flanders' house, but do a bad job and provoke an outburst.

Writer John Swartzwelder's animated likeness can be seen in a padded cell, in reference to his reclusiveness.

A caricature of John Swartzwelder can be seen shutting the door of a room in Calmwood Mental Hospital. Later in the episode, during the scene where the townsfolk are welcoming Ned back, someone can be seen holding a sign that says "Free John Swartzwelder". During the sequence where Flanders yells at the town, a man with a ponytail and wearing a white shirt who is a caricature of Bob Anderson can be seen.

== Cultural references ==
The scene at the beginning of the episode, in which the people of Springfield mob the Kwik-E-Mart, is based on the events of the 1992 Los Angeles riots. Todd is wearing a Butthole Surfers T-shirt; however, the censors only allowed the letters Buttho Surfers to appear onscreen, partially obscuring the band's offensive name. The opening sequence is parodied during the storm when the words The Hurricane appears onscreen, accompanied by the same chorus that sings the show's name. Jay Sherman from The Critic, who had previously appeared in "A Star Is Burns", can be seen in the mental hospital repeatedly saying his catchphrase, "It stinks"; Ms. Botz from "Some Enchanted Evening" appears as a patient in a nearby room, pacing threateningly. A small door at the end of the hallway in Flanders' rebuilt house echoes the improbably small hallway in the film Willy Wonka & the Chocolate Factory. Several scenes from the hospital were taken from One Flew Over the Cuckoo's Nest.

== Reception ==
In its original broadcast, "Hurricane Neddy" finished 18th in ratings for the week of December 23–29, 1996, with a Nielsen rating of 8.7, equivalent to approximately 8.4 million viewing households. It was the second-highest-rated show on the Fox network that week, following The X-Files.

Marge's line, "Dear God, this is Marge Simpson. If you stop this hurricane and save our family, we will be forever grateful and recommend you to all our friends", was cited by journalist Mark Pinsky as an example of how "Simpson family members are both defined and circumscribed by religion." Journalist Ben Rayner speculated that some fans, whom he called "nerds", would want an explanation of "how Barney fit through that tiny door to the 'master bedroom' in the rebuilt Flanders family home." Rowan Kaiser writes that "The Simpsons eighth season has a lot of ideas for itself, and how it could continue to work as a great comedy. They almost all work, which is remarkable, and 'Hurricane Neddy' is one of the best examples of the season's strengths."
