= Homer vs. the Eighteenth Amendment =

- The Simpsons episode
- Homer proclaiming his love for alcohol to Springfield
- Episode no.: Season 8 Episode 18
- Directed by: Bob Anderson
- Written by: John Swartzwelder
- Production code: 4F15
- Original air date: March 16, 1997

Guest appearances
- Dave Thomas as Rex Banner; Joe Mantegna as Fat Tony

Episode features
- Couch gag: The Simpsons are depicted as cowboys; the couch, like a horse, rides away.
- Commentary: Matt Groening; Josh Weinstein; Dan Castellaneta; Dave Thomas; Bob Anderson; David Silverman

Episode chronology
← Previous "My Sister, My Sitter"	Next → "Grade School Confidential"
- The Simpsons season 8

"Homer vs. the Eighteenth Amendment" is the eighteenth episode of the eighth season of the American animated television series The Simpsons. It originally aired on the Fox network in the United States on March 16, 1997. In the episode, Springfield enacts prohibition after a raucous Saint Patrick's Day celebration. To supply Moe's speakeasy, Homer becomes a bootlegger. The episode was written by John Swartzwelder and directed by Bob Anderson. Dave Thomas guest stars as Rex Banner and Joe Mantegna returns as Fat Tony.

== Plot ==
After Bart Simpson accidentally gets drunk at a St. Patrick's Day parade, a prohibitionist movement emerges in Springfield. When it is discovered that a ban on alcohol has been in effect but gone unnoticed for two centuries, Mayor Quimby, not wanting to alienate voters during an election year, agrees to enforce the law. However, the mob continues to supply the town with alcohol through bribery of local law enforcers, allowing Moe Szyslak to reopen his bar disguised as a pet shop. There, a group of staunch prohibitionists discover an intoxicated Chief Wiggum and demand his removal. Wiggum is replaced by U.S. Treasury officer Rex Banner, who blockades the city entrance and buries all of the alcohol in a pit at the city dump.

Homer Simpson concocts a plan to continue supplying Springfield with alcohol: he and Bart reclaim the beer disposed of at the dump, pour it into the finger holes of bowling balls and, through an intricate network of pipes set up under Barney's Bowl-A-Rama, bowls them straight to Moe's. Upon discovering their scheme, Marge is actually impressed Homer was able to devise it and encourages him to continue, although Lisa questions whether Homer should be breaking the law even if it may be arcane or unpopular. The media realizes someone is allowing Springfield's underground alcohol trade to flourish, and they dub the still-unknown Homer "The Beer Baron". Banner's unsuccessful policing of Springfield's prohibition law and investigation into the Beer Baron's identity sees him miss or overlook blatant clues that the law is being ignored by the town and that Homer is the Beer Baron (which is effectively an open secret to the rest of the town).

When the beer supply runs out, Homer distills his own liquor at home but eventually his stills explode, leading Homer to cease bootlegging (after one sets him on fire). A desperate ex-Chief Wiggum attempts to mug Homer with the remains of his gun, leading Homer to pity Wiggum and allowing him to turn him over to the police. After confessing to his crimes in public, Homer, originally believing he would be let off with a light punishment, faces expulsion from the town (and likely death) by catapult. Marge pleads with the town not to punish Homer as the prohibition law and its punishment make no sense and are robbing people of their freedoms. When Banner steps up to lecture the town on the reasons why the law must be upheld, Wiggum, having heard enough, has him catapulted. The town clerk then finds out that the prohibition law was actually repealed a year after it was enacted and Homer is released. Mayor Quimby asks Homer if he can re-supply the town with alcohol, but Homer tells him that he is retired. Within five minutes, Fat Tony and the mob have the town re-stocked and Springfield salutes alcohol's qualities, with Homer proclaiming his undying love of alcohol by saying, "To alcohol! The cause of, and solution to, all of life's problems."

== Production ==
The main plot of the episode is based on the Eighteenth Amendment to the United States Constitution, which banned alcohol in the United States. As The Simpsons has many episodes that have stories and jokes related to alcohol, the writers thought it was strange that they had never done an episode related to Prohibition, and that the idea seemed "perfect." The episode features a vast amount of Irish stereotyping at the St. Patrick's Day celebration. The show has a long history of Irish humor; Conan O'Brien, a former writer of Irish descent, made use of Irish stereotypes. Various writers were very concerned about Bart getting drunk. This was why he drank the beer through a horn, to show that it was only accidental. This was a toned-down version of what was in John Swartzwelder's original script. Originally Chief Wiggum's first line was "They're either drunk or on the cocaine", but it was deemed too old-fashioned. The discovery of "more lines on the parchment" was a simple deus ex machina to get Homer freed and to end the episode.

When Homer first enters Moe's "Pet Shop", the man that tips his hat to him outside was a background character used in the early seasons. The riot at the beginning of the episode was taken from footage from the end of the season 6 episode, "Lisa on Ice", and updated. The line "To alcohol! The cause of, and solution to, all of life's problems," was originally the act break line at the end of act two, but was moved to the very end of the episode.

== Cultural references ==
The shot of the diner, a reference to Edward Hopper's Nighthawks.

The episode parodies the series The Untouchables, with the character of Rex Banner based on Robert Stack's portrayal of Eliot Ness, and the voice of the narrator being based on that of Walter Winchell. Barney leaving flowers outside the Duff brewery is, according to show runner Josh Weinstein, a reference to people leaving flowers at the grave sites of various Hollywood figures like Rudolph Valentino and Marilyn Monroe. In the St. Patrick's Day parade, there's a float carrying "The Drunken Irish Novelists of Springfield"; on it is James Joyce. The shot of the diner references Edward Hopper's Nighthawks painting.

== Reception ==
In its original broadcast, "Homer vs. the Eighteenth Amendment" finished 39th in ratings for the week of March 10–26, 1997, with a Nielsen rating of 8.9, equivalent to approximately 8.6 million viewing households. It was the second-highest-rated show on the Fox network that week, following The X-Files.

The authors of the book, I Can't Believe It's a Bigger and Better Updated Unofficial Simpsons Guide, Gary Russell and Gareth Roberts, called it "A nice episode in which Homer actually devises a clever plan to keep the beer flowing." The Toronto Star described the episode as one of Bob Anderson's "classics". The Daily Telegraph also characterized the episode as one of "The 10 Best Simpsons TV Episodes". Robert Canning gave the episode 9.8/10 calling it his favorite episode of the series.

Homer's line "To alcohol! The cause of, and solution to, all of life's problems," was described by Josh Weinstein as "one of the best, most truthful Simpsons statements ever". In 2008, Entertainment Weekly included it in their list of "24 Endlessly Quotable TV Quips".

A scene in which a British chip shop named "John Bull's Fish & Chips" blows up was censored in Britain and Ireland but it is no longer. This scene is shown uncensored on the Disney+ streaming service.

Erik Adams writes of the episode of Second City TV on the episode: "There’s a hum to the jokes of 'Homer Vs. The Eighteenth Amendment,' showing off an ear for heightened genre dialogue. This is another place where the episode shows its SCTV heritage: That show and this episode thrive on what their writers absorbed from TV, movies, records, and radio—the good stuff as well as the bad—repurposing it in ways that celebrate its conventions (tommy guns, hot jazz, car chases through cemeteries!) and satirize its clichés. Banner’s chatter is all G-man jargon, but Thomas holds his own with mouthfuls of colorful language like 'Listen, rummy, I’m gonna say it plain and simple: Where’d you pinch the hooch? Is some blind tiger jerking suds on the side?'”
