= My Sister, My Sitter =

- The Simpsons episode
- Episode no.: Season 8 Episode 17
- Directed by: Jim Reardon
- Written by: Dan Greaney
- Production code: 4F13
- Original air date: March 2, 1997

Episode features
- Couch gag: The living room is on a ship being tossed by a stormy ocean. The Simpsons, decked out in raingear, run to the couch, but get washed away by a large wave.
- Commentary: Matt Groening; Josh Weinstein; Molly Weinstein; Simon Weinstein; Yeardley Smith; Jim Reardon; George Meyer

Episode chronology
← Previous "Brother from Another Series"	Next → "Homer vs. the Eighteenth Amendment"
- The Simpsons season 8

"My Sister, My Sitter" is the seventeenth episode of the eighth season of the American animated television series The Simpsons. It originally aired on the Fox network in the United States on March 2, 1997. In the episode, Marge and Homer leave Lisa to babysit Bart and Maggie. Annoyed that his younger sister is his babysitter, Bart does everything he can to annoy her. When Bart is injured, Lisa must find him medical attention without spoiling her reputation as a good babysitter.

The episode was written by Dan Greaney and directed by Jim Reardon. The script was written to focus on the relationship between Bart and Lisa and the episode has further been used to discuss the difficulties in letting children babysit themselves. It received mostly positive reviews. The title is a play on words with the 1994 film Sister My Sister.

== Plot ==
Inspired by The Baby-Sitters Club series of novels, Lisa decides to become a babysitter, but no one takes her seriously because of her age. When Maude is taken hostage in Lebanon, Ned must leave suddenly to get her released. In his haste, he agrees to let Lisa babysit Rod and Todd. Ned puts out the good word for Lisa, who experiences a business boom.

Inspired by the success of Baltimore's revamped wharf, the Springfield Squidport reopens and throws a gala. Homer and Marge attend, leaving Lisa to babysit Bart and Maggie. Bart is upset that his younger sister is his babysitter; Lisa thinks his childish antics warrant it. Bart torments Lisa by having a giant submarine sandwich delivered, hiring Krusty for a bachelor party, claiming that Lisa saw a UFO, dialing 9-1-1 for a "sisterectomy", and feeding Maggie coffee ice cream for dinner.

Bart's pranks anger Lisa so much that she lunges at him, causing him to fall down the stairs, dislocating his shoulder and leaving a large bump on his head. Bart realizes if Lisa fails to take him to a nearby hospital, her reputation as a babysitter will be ruined. To make his condition worse, Bart locks himself in his room and repeatedly bangs his head against the door, eventually knocking himself unconscious.

Lisa tries to call for an ambulance, but the 9-1-1 operator refuses to assist her due to Bart's earlier prank calls. Lisa considers asking Dr. Hibbert for help, but realizes that would ruin her reputation as a babysitter. Instead, she takes Bart to Dr. Nick Riviera's clinic in a wheelbarrow, bringing Maggie along in a pet carrier because the coffee ice cream has overstimulated her. Lisa is unable to see the doctor due to a long queue in the waiting room.

Frantic, Lisa tries to wheel Bart and Maggie to the hospital. After encountering Chief Wiggum whilst he is on patrol, she loses control of the wheelbarrow, and it rolls down a cliff into a muddy river — in front of aghast onlookers at the Squidport. The crowd assumes Lisa is on drugs, has murdered Bart, and is about to drown the caged Maggie, and accuse her of bad babysitting.

The next day, Bart had his injuries treated, he finds Lisa in her room where she has been grounded for what happened last night, and he apologizes to her for causing the ordeal and ruining her babysitting business. She forgives him, but feels bad for being called the "World's Worst Babysitter". Much to her delight, she receives babysitting requests from Hibbert and Ned, who brush off accusations against Lisa of her supposed attempt on Bart's life because they cannot find any other sitters.

== Production and themes ==
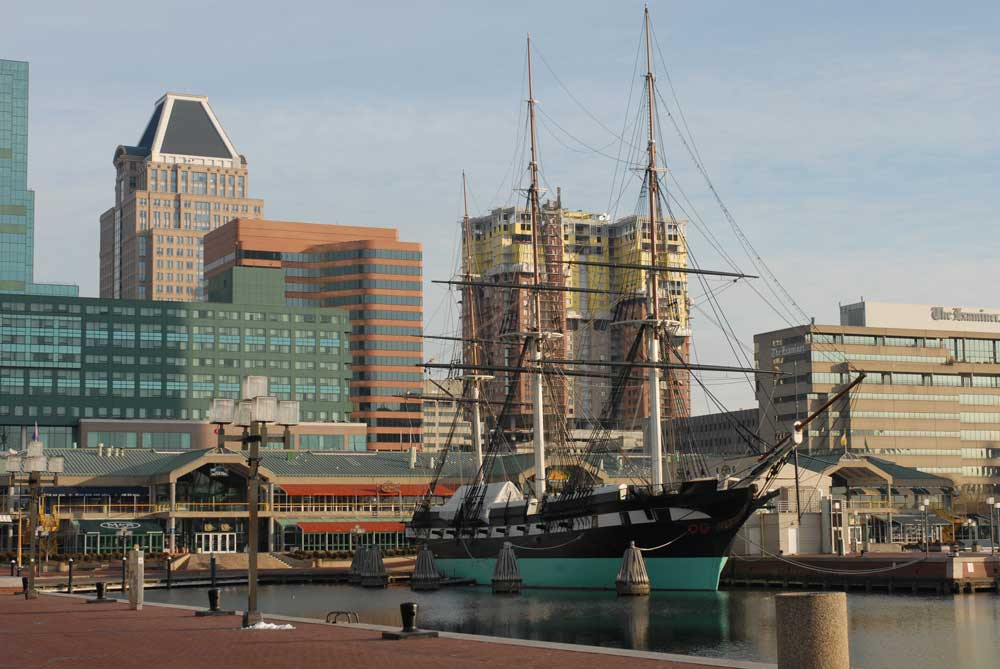
The Squidport was inspired by waterfront renovations such as Harborplace in Baltimore.

The episode was directed by Jim Reardon and written by Dan Greaney. Like numerous preceding episodes, "My Sister, My Sitter" deals with the relationship between Bart and Lisa. Greaney specializes in writing Bart and Lisa episodes from the perspective of a kid. Elaine E Sutherland, who is a member of the Law Society of Scotland's Family Law Sub-Committee and Professor of Child and Family Law at the Law School, Stirling University, used the episode to describe the potential problems of letting one of your kids babysit the rest. While one child may be mature enough to babysit, it is not certain that the other kids accept the babysitter's authority. According to Alan S. Brown and Chris Logan, the writers of the book The Psychology of the Simpsons: D’oh!, the episode is an example of how feminine anger rarely solves the problem on The Simpsons. “Here, Lisa’s rage and ongoing frustration contribute to her difficulty in making good decisions about what to do with her emotion,” they write. Keeping with the babysitter theme, there are cultural references to The Baby-Sitters Club: Lisa reads book #14 - The Formula Formula, while Janey is on book #20 - The President's Baby Is Missing.

The idea of revamping the waterfront came from cities like Baltimore, who were always trying to fix formerly horrible places. Chris Turner, the author of the book Planet Simpson, writes about the scene at the Squidport: "The 'satirical' setting seems almost documentary". The Squidport is a local revitalization project, which recast a historic industrial area as a pedestrian mall. He calls this an example of how "hyper-consumer culture of Springfield moves front and center". On the waterfront, Rainier Wolfcastle opens a restaurant called "Planet Hype". This is a parody of the international theme restaurant franchise Planet Hollywood. Wolfcastle is a parody of Arnold Schwarzenegger, who launched Planet Hollywood along with Sylvester Stallone, Bruce Willis, Demi Moore and Whoopi Goldberg in 1991. According to Matt Groening, the show had written an entire episode around Planet Hollywood, which featured the voices of Schwarzenegger, Stallone, and Willis as The Three Stooges type of characters. The episode was never animated, because it turned out that it was only the publicist of Planet Hollywood's idea and the actors did not want to participate.

== Reception ==
In its original broadcast, "My Sister, My Sitter" finished 47th in ratings in a tie with Melrose Place for the week of February 24 – March 2, 1997, with a Nielsen rating of 9.0, equivalent to approximately 8.7 million viewing households. It was the fifth highest-rated show on the Fox network that week.

Since airing, the episode has received mostly positive reviews from television critics. The authors of the book I Can't Believe It's a Bigger and Better Updated Unofficial Simpsons Guide, Gary Russell and Gareth Roberts, called it "a clever episode, if a little disjointed — the two stories don't gel as well as normal."

Tim Raynor of DVDTown.com said that the episode "is full of the usual, fun antics that you would expect from Bart or any of the other dumb Simpsons."

DVD Movie Guide's Colin Jacobson said that "the segments in which Lisa babysits the various kids in town are a delight" and that the episode "mixes wacky moments with reality as it places Lisa in a logical position. Her conflict with Bart creates realism and also brings out the comedy."
