= Bart After Dark =

- The Simpsons episode
- Episode no.: Season 8 Episode 5
- Directed by: Dominic Polcino
- Written by: Richard Appel
- Production code: 4F06
- Original air date: November 24, 1996

Episode features
- Couch gag: A parody of the Sgt. Pepper album cover.
- Commentary: Matt Groening; Josh Weinstein; Richard Appel; Dominic Polcino; David Silverman; Ken Keeler

Episode chronology
← Previous "Burns, Baby Burns"	Next → "A Milhouse Divided"
- The Simpsons season 8

"Bart After Dark" is the fifth episode of the eighth season of the American animated television series The Simpsons. It originally aired on the Fox network in the United States on November 24, 1996. After accidentally breaking a stone gargoyle at a local house, Bart is forced to work there as punishment. He assumes it will be boring work, but is surprised when he learns that it is actually a burlesque house. Marge is horrified when she learns of this, and resolves to have it shut down. The episode was directed by Dominic Polcino and written by Richard Appel.

It won an Emmy Award for "Outstanding Music and Lyrics" for the song "We Put the Spring in Springfield".

== Plot ==
An oil tanker runs aground, spilling millions of gallons of oil on Baby Seal Beach. Lisa begs Marge to help celebrities scrub oil tar from shorebirds and sea mammals. Marge, Lisa and Maggie drive to the beach, leaving Bart and Homer home alone. Soon the house becomes a filthy mess, so Bart goes outside to play with his friends.

Milhouse's toy airplane crashes atop the roof of a Gothic house. While Bart, Milhouse, Nelson, Ralph and Martin went to retrieve it, he accidentally falls, destroying a stone gargoyle. Belle, the owner of the house, grabs Bart by the ear and takes him home, much to the horror of his friends. At the Simpson home, Belle demands that Homer punish Bart for trespassing on her property. Homer balks until Belle threatens to come back and speak with Marge if he won't discipline Bart. Homer forces Bart to perform chores for Belle at the Maison Derrière, which the boy soon learns is a burlesque house. Bart does his job with enthusiasm and becomes indispensable to Belle. Marge and Lisa arrive at the beach, but discover that cleaning beach tar from animals is a task reserved only for celebrities. Instead, they are put to work scrubbing rocks, a job they soon abandon to return home.

After Homer learns the truth about the burlesque house, he does nothing to stop Bart from working there. Principal Skinner visits the house and sees Bart is the door greeter. He reports it to the Lovejoys and the Flanderses, who confront Homer about Bart's workplace. As Homer crows that he has no problem with Bart working at a burlesque house, Marge returns home unexpectedly and is upset to learn this.

Marge asks Belle to close the house and leave Springfield, but Belle refuses, saying it is a part of Springfield and that she has deeper ties to the town than Marge does. Marge presses the matter at a town meeting and shows slides of several prominent citizens leaving the Maison Derrière. Marge's campaign convinces the town to form a mob to destroy the house.

The mob arrives at the house and starts smashing property. Homer tries to stop the mob's rampage by singing a musical number, accompanied by Belle and her burlesque dancers. The townfolk join in singing and are persuaded to let the house stay. However, Marge arrives with a bulldozer, having missed the song. As she starts a song about her stance on the house, she accidentally puts the bulldozer in drive and destroys a wing of the Maison. She apologizes profusely to Belle and the townsfolk for wrecking their beloved house. To pay for the damage, Marge performs a ventriloquist act at the house, where she is heckled by Homer — who is promptly removed by the bouncer, Bart.

== Production ==
The episode was written by Richard Appel and directed by Dominic Polcino. Appel was looking for new locales to put Bart and thought it would be funny to have him work at a burlesque house. The problem was to find a way to put such a house in Springfield, which was solved with the bit with the toy airplane. There were a dozen different possible names for the burlesque house, some of which were raunchy. This episode marks one of the four times Lisa has a minor role in a Season 8 episode (like she had a minor role in the Season 7 episode "Two Bad Neighbors"), the others being "Grade School Confidential", "Homer's Enemy", and "The Simpsons Spin-Off Showcase", although she has major/supporting roles in the season's other episodes.

Josh Weinstein has said that there are so many sleazy characters in The Simpsons that it was easy to find people for the scenes in the burlesque house. A character modeled after John Swartzwelder can also be seen. Belle was not modeled after anyone in particular and she was redesigned several times. Belle was voiced by Tress MacNeille, but there had been previous efforts to cast a guest voice for the role.

== Cultural references ==
Much of the episode's plot is based on the film The Best Little Whorehouse in Texas. The oil spill is a reference to the Exxon Valdez oil spill. The Sea Captain is shown to be drunk at the helm, a reference to Joseph Hazelwood, the captain of the Exxon Valdez who was accused of being intoxicated. Reverend Lovejoy's line, "This house is a very, very, very fine house", is a reference to the Crosby, Stills, Nash, & Young song "Our House". Homer responds to a "Do you know where your children are?" public service announcement by saying, "I told you last night — no!"

=== Couch gag ===

The episode's couch gag is a reference to Sgt. Pepper's Lonely Hearts Club Band, and features (from back left to right) Selma, Patty, a power plant worker, Karl, Apu, Barney Gumble, Radioactive Man, Reverend Lovejoy, Principal Skinner, Sideshow Bob, Otto, Smithers, Mr. Burns, Marvin Monroe, Herbert, Flanders, Jimbo, Kearney, Hans Moleman, Chief Wiggum, Kent Brockman, Mrs. Krabappel, Dr. Hibbert, Mayor Quimby, Itchy, Cletus, Brandine, Moe, Troy McClure, Dolph, Bleeding Gums Murphy, the Tracey Ullman Show Simpsons, Marge, Maggie, Homer, Lisa, Bart, Comic Book Guy, Krusty, Princess Kashmir, Eddie and Lou, Martin, Milhouse, and Nelson. Around the bottom are assorted Simpsons items, such as a Homer Buddha statue, Santa's Little Helper, Snowball II, the Head of Jebediah Springfield, the Simpsons TV, and Blinky the three-eyed fish.

== Reception ==
In its original broadcast, "Bart After Dark" finished 57th in ratings for the week of November 18–24, 1996, with a Nielsen rating of 8.5, equivalent to approximately 8.2 million viewing households. It was the fourth-highest-rated show on the Fox network that week, following The X-Files, Melrose Place, and Beverly Hills, 90210.

Ken Keeler and Alf Clausen won a Primetime Emmy Award for "Outstanding Music and Lyrics" for "We Put the Spring in Springfield". The song was also a part of the album Go Simpsonic with The Simpsons.
