= The Canine Mutiny =

- The Simpsons episode
- Bart and Laddie dispose of the credit card.
- Episode no.: Season 8 Episode 20
- Directed by: Dominic Polcino
- Written by: Ron Hauge
- Production code: 4F16
- Original air date: April 13, 1997

Guest appearance
- Frank Welker as Laddie

Episode features
- Chalkboard gag: "A fire drill does not demand a fire"
- Couch gag: The couch is folded out into a bed with Grampa asleep on it. Grampa can only utter a cry of “Huh?” before The Simpsons fold him into the couch as they sit down as normal.
- Commentary: Josh Weinstein; Dominic Polcino; George Meyer

Episode chronology
← Previous "Grade School Confidential"	Next → "The Old Man and the Lisa"
- The Simpsons season 8

"The Canine Mutiny" is the twentieth episode of the eighth season of the American animated television series The Simpsons. It originally aired on the Fox network in the United States on April 13, 1997. It was written by Ron Hauge and directed by Dominic Polcino. In this episode, Bart fraudulently applies for a credit card and uses it to buy an expensive trained dog called Laddie. It guest stars voice actor Frank Welker as Laddie, a parody of Lassie. The episode's title references the novel The Caine Mutiny.

== Plot ==
When Bart complains he never gets any mail, Marge gives him the family's junk mail. He completes a credit card application under the name of the family dog, Santa's Little Helper. Bart receives a credit card issued to "Santos L. Halper" after the company misreads his application. He goes on a spending spree, buying the family expensive gifts from a mail-order catalog: smoked salmon and a radio-frying pan for Marge, a golf shirt for Homer, pep pills for Lisa and several things for himself. Undeterred by its US$1,200 price, Bart orders a purebred rough collie. When the dog arrives, Bart learns his name is Laddie and he is trained to perform several tasks. The Simpsons fall in love with the new dog and neglect Santa's Little Helper.

When he fails to pay his credit card bill, Bart gets a call from a debt collection agency demanding payment. When the calls and collection letters persist, he enlists Laddie's help to bury the ill-gotten card. Soon, repo men arrive to confiscate his purchases. When a repossessor asks for the $1,200 dog to be returned, Bart identifies Santa's Little Helper as the dog. The greyhound is herded into the truck, and he watches sadly as it drives away.

Realizing Santa's Little Helper is gone, the family bonds with Laddie, except for Bart, who fears for Santa's Little Helper's fate. When an exhausted Bart takes Laddie on one of his frequent walks, the collie saves the life of Baby Gerald. At the ceremony honoring Laddie's heroism, Chief Wiggum decides that he would make the perfect police dog. Bart gives him to the Springfield police force and breaks down crying while explaining to his family why they no longer have any dog at all. Homer instructs him to find Santa's Little Helper. Bart eventually learns from Reverend Lovejoy that the dog was given to a parishioner, Mr. Mitchell.

Bart visits Mitchell to beg for his dog back, but he sees that the man is blind because he fails to notice his parrot has died. When Bart hears how the man and Santa's Little Helper have bonded, he grows heartsick and leaves. Later, Bart makes a late-night visit to the man's home and retrieves Santa's Little Helper. While trying to escape, he traps himself in a closet after mistaking it for an outside door. Thinking Bart is a burglar, Mitchell gloats that he has called the police. Bart explains that he is just a child and the dog was originally his. Bart and Mitchell call to Santa's Little Helper, so he can decide which owner he prefers. After briefly getting distracted by chasing his own tail, Santa's Little Helper chooses Bart. Chief Wiggum arrives with Laddie, who immediately sniffs out a bag of marijuana in Mitchell's pocket. As Bart and Santa's Little Helper head home, more police officers arrive to enjoy the confiscated cannabis.

== Production ==
The episode uses the full opening sequence because the story ran short. A long sequence was cut from the middle of the episode, with half of the episode being re-written after the animatic had been finished. The main plot of the episode came from an original idea that the family would be issued a credit card in the name "Hobart Simpson" which Bart would use. An original subplot was that Lisa would become addicted to "Trucker's Choice" pep pills. Originally, instead of going to the dog park, the family took Laddie to a waterfall, where he performed a series of dives. This idea was scrapped since the script already proved that Laddie was a form of "superdog". Likewise, the scene where Laddie rescues Baby Gerald was originally more complicated, but it was cut; the finished episode shows only the aftermath of Laddie's rescue.

Laddie was designed to resemble a real dog. The catalog Bart uses is a combination of the Lillian Vernon catalog and The Sharper Image store. The opening stemmed from the fact that the show had not had a sequence where the family received mail, and the writers wanted to create a joke about the different types of mail addressed to each family member. After Bart's "dog burning" fantasy, when he hears a ship's horn in the distance, there was originally going to be a faint cry of "more dogs", but it was deemed taking the joke too far. Hank Azaria ad-libbed the entire sequence during the closing credits in which Chief Wiggum and Lou sing along to "Jamming".

== Cultural references ==
The title is a reference to the novel and film The Caine Mutiny. The dog Laddie is a riff on Lassie's name, appearance and uncanny intelligence. Marge listens to the song "You Really Got Me" by The Kinks on her frying pan radio. At the end of the episode, the song "Jamming" by Bob Marley is played. The design of the Repo Depot is based very loosely on the repossession agency from Repo Man. The address of Mr. Mitchell's house, 57 Mt. Auburn Street, is one of the addresses of The Harvard Lampoon. Mr. Mitchell's belief that his dead parrot is still alive is a reference to the "Dead Parrot" Monty Python sketch.

== Reception ==
In its original broadcast, "The Canine Mutiny" finished 43rd in ratings for the week of April 7–13, 1997, with a Nielsen rating of 8.1, equivalent to approximately 7.9 million viewing households. It was the fourth highest-rated show on the Fox network that week, following The X-Files, King of the Hill, and Beverly Hills, 90210.

The episode's ending with Chief Wiggum and Lou singing along to "Jamming" by Bob Marley is often cited as one of the best endings in the history of the show. The authors of the book I Can't Believe It's a Bigger and Better Updated Unofficial Simpsons Guide, Gary Russell and Gareth Roberts, called it "A sweet episode". Homer's line "There, there, shut up boy" is one of Josh Weinstein's favorites.
