= Burns, Baby Burns =

- The Simpsons episode
- Mr. Burns being hugged by his long-lost son Larry
- Episode no.: Season 8 Episode 4
- Directed by: Jim Reardon
- Written by: Ian Maxtone-Graham
- Production code: 4F05
- Original air date: November 17, 1996

Guest appearance
- Rodney Dangerfield as Larry Burns

Episode features
- Couch gag: The Simpsons are clear blue bubbles that float to the couch and pop one by one.
- Commentary: Matt Groening; Josh Weinstein; Ian Maxtone-Graham; Jim Reardon; David X. Cohen; George Meyer; Mark Kirkland

Episode chronology
← Previous "The Homer They Fall"	Next → "Bart After Dark"
- The Simpsons season 8

"Burns, Baby Burns" is the fourth episode of the eighth season of the American animated television series The Simpsons. It originally aired on the Fox network in the United States on November 17, 1996. In the episode, Mr. Burns reunites with his long-lost son Larry. At first, they get along well, but Mr. Burns soon realizes that his son is an oaf. The episode was directed by Jim Reardon and is the first one written by Ian Maxtone-Graham. The episode guest starred Rodney Dangerfield as Larry Burns.

== Plot ==
After attending the annual Harvard–Yale football game, Mr. Burns and Waylon Smithers take a train back to Springfield. When the train makes an unexpected stop, a man named Larry approaches them selling souvenirs. Seeing Burns, he compares his face with an old photo and notes the resemblance. Suddenly, the train pulls away, leaving Larry behind. While on their way home from visiting a cider mill, the Simpsons see Larry hitchhiking and give him a ride. They take him to Burns' mansion where Larry reveals that he is the old man's son.

After finding the birthmark that confirms that Larry is his son, Burns admits that Larry was the result of a one-night stand with the daughter of a former flame named Lily Bancroft at a college reunion. At first, he is overjoyed to have a son and treats him as his protégé. He takes him to fancy parties and tries to enroll him at Yale, but Larry's oafish behavior embarrasses him. Larry starts working alongside Homer in Sector 7G at the Springfield Nuclear Power Plant, and they become friends. Larry invites Homer to dinner at the mansion. No longer able to contain his displeasure at Larry's boorishness, Burns says that he wishes he had no son.

After Homer convinces Larry to fake a kidnapping so that Burns will admit that he loves his son, he moves into the Simpsons' basement. Homer tells Burns that he can have Larry back if he admits that he loves him. Marge discovers the plan and convinces Homer and Larry to abandon it, but they are spotted by Kent Brockman's news helicopter as they leave the house.

Homer and Larry run around town avoiding the police, being unsuccessful in looking for a place to hide. After managing to hide in the Aztec Theater, they unwittingly attract the attention of the police and media after Hans Moleman calls the police on them for harassing him. Homer and Larry climb atop the movie theater and have a brief standoff with the police. As Burns demands for Homer to be shot dead, Larry admits that it was all a hoax.

Homer gives a heartfelt speech to justify Larry's actions and Burns forgives them for the hoax, but explains he cannot be the family whom Larry needs. Larry understands and reveals he has a wife and children back home who are probably worried about him. After Burns and Larry say their goodbyes, a party spontaneously breaks out in front of the cinema at Larry's incitement as the song "Any Way You Want It" by Journey plays in the background.

== Production ==
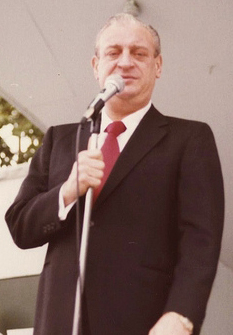
Comedian Rodney Dangerfield voiced Larry Burns, whose character design was a mix between him and Mr. Burns.

Ian Maxtone-Graham wrote the episode, and it was his first writing credit for The Simpsons, although he had served as a consultant on the show for several months prior. Maxtone-Graham had previously worked with showrunners Bill Oakley and Josh Weinstein on a game show and the two had wanted to hire him as a writer on The Simpsons. The episode started out as a story about Mr. Burns and Grampa both being stationed in Paris during World War II and falling in love with the same woman, who had a love child. Maxtone-Graham, however, had wanted this episode to be about Burns having a child, which is where it went. The other episode idea became "Raging Abe Simpson and His Grumbling Grandson in 'The Curse of the Flying Hellfish'", which aired during the previous season. The episode opens with the family visiting Mt. Swartzwelder Historic Cider Mill (a reference to fellow writer John Swartzwelder) because the writers had wanted to do something involving autumn and a cider mill seemed like a good setting for that.

Rodney Dangerfield guest stars in this episode and was a huge favorite of many of the show's writers. Many of the jokes in the episode were specifically written to be "Dangerfield jokes", which were much tougher to write than the staff had originally thought. Dangerfield made a few key changes to his script during the recording of his part; Weinstein kept the annotated script and pen and considers them among his three most prized The Simpsons possessions. Designing Larry Burns was a challenge because the director had wanted him to look like Dangerfield but still have Burns' characteristics such as the pointed nose.

== Cultural references ==
Homer's Snoopy puzzle, designed with the nose missing to avoid copyright infringement

The title of the episode references a line in The Trammps song "Disco Inferno" ("Burn, baby, burn"). After discovering that Larry Burns is also working in Sector 7G, Homer frantically cleans up and puts away an almost entirely assembled jigsaw puzzle which has an image of Snoopy lying on his doghouse. The puzzle is missing several pieces over where Snoopy's nose should be, which was intentionally drawn that way to avoid copyright infringement.

The character from Yale that Mr. Burns briefly talks to is based on the fictional character Dink Stover from the book Dink Stover at Yale by Owen Johnson. The episode contains several references to the film Caddyshack, in which Dangerfield starred in, such as the scene where Larry tries to fit in with Mr. Burns' associates. The final street party, which features the song "Any Way You Want It" by Journey (also featured in Caddyshack), also parodies the way that several films, including Caddyshack itself, end. The episode ends at a movie theater, which is a reference to several famous criminals who were involved with theatres, such as John Dillinger, Lee Harvey Oswald, and John Wilkes Booth.

== Reception ==
In its original broadcast, "Burns, Baby Burns" finished 64th in ratings for the week of November 11–17, 1996, with a Nielsen rating of 7.7, equivalent to approximately 7.5 million viewing households. It was the fourth-highest-rated show on the Fox network that week, following The X-Files, Melrose Place, and Beverly Hills, 90210.

The authors of the book I Can't Believe It's a Bigger and Better Updated Unofficial Simpsons Guide, Gary Russell and Gareth Roberts, called it "[a] fun episode, with Rodney Dangerfield putting a lot of pathos into Larry – and Homer's impassioned speech atop the cinema at the climax is one of his funniest moments." Erik Adams calls it "A story that's best viewed as a celebration of a comedic genius, appropriately topped off with a party thrown in his honor. So what? So let's dance!"
