= The Homer They Fall =

- The Simpsons episode
- Episode no.: Season 8 Episode 3
- Directed by: Mark Kirkland
- Written by: Jonathan Collier
- Production code: 4F03
- Original air date: November 10, 1996

Guest appearances
- Paul Winfield as Lucius Sweet; Michael Buffer as himself

Episode features
- Chalkboard gag: "I am not my long-lost twin"
- Couch gag: The living room is in a desert and the family is dressed as cowboys and cowgirls. When the family sits down, the couch neighs and gallops away.
- Commentary: Matt Groening; Josh Weinstein; Dan Castellaneta; Yeardley Smith; David X. Cohen; George Meyer; Mark Kirkland

Episode chronology
← Previous "You Only Move Twice"	Next → "Burns, Baby Burns"
- The Simpsons season 8

"The Homer They Fall" is the third episode of the eighth season of the American animated television series The Simpsons. It originally aired on the Fox network in the United States on November 10, 1996. After Homer realizes he has a bizarre medical condition that renders him unable to be knocked out, Moe convinces him to start a career as a boxer and allow the bartender to manage him, eventually landing him a shot at the heavyweight championship of the world, going up against Drederick Tatum (a parody of Mike Tyson). The episode was written by Jonathan Collier and directed by Mark Kirkland. It guest stars Michael Buffer as himself and Paul Winfield as Lucius Sweet.

== Plot ==
During the Simpsons' visit to a high-tech gadget store, Bart buys a gimmicky utility belt from Comic Book Guy, who had tried and failed to return it. When he shows it off at school the next day, Dolph, Jimbo and Kearney beat him up and steal it. To get the belt back, Homer confronts their fathers at Moe's Tavern; they beat him up but find that they cannot knock him down, even after breaking a pool cue over his head.

After seeing Homer's ability to absorb physical punishment, Moe suggests that he take up boxing and allow Moe (himself a former boxer) to manage and train him. Marge insists that Homer have a full medical checkup first. Dr. Hibbert finds that the layer of fluid around Homer's brain is thicker than normal, allowing him to withstand powerful blows to the head. Discovering that Homer is too weak and out of shape to inflict any damage by punching, Moe suggests that he let opponents attack him until they tire out, then push them down for an easy victory.

Homer prevails in his first fights against several homeless men, eventually rising to the top of the Springfield semi-professional boxing circuit and attracting the attention of Lucius Sweet, Moe's former boxing manager. Lucius tells Moe that current heavyweight champion Drederick Tatum is about to be released from prison and wants a comeback fight, preferably against Homer. Moe knows that Tatum is far too strong and fit for Homer to tire out, but the lure of fame and fortune makes him agree to the fight. Promising Lucius that the fight will last at least three rounds, Moe quickly wins Homer over by feigning confidence in his fighting skills.

Homer ignores Marge's pleas to withdraw from the fight, which is wildly hyped by the media. On the night of the event, Moe falsely promises Marge that he will throw in the towel if Homer appears to be in any danger. Tatum's first punch is strong enough to leave Homer badly dazed, and Marge urges him to start fighting back. Homer's punch completely misses Tatum, who hammers his head and prepares to deliver a punch that will either knock him out or kill him. Just before he can land the blow, Moe swoops in using a paramotor borrowed from the Fan Man and airlifts Homer out of the ring while the audience boos loudly.

Outside the arena, Marge thanks Moe for saving Homer while Tatum expresses his respect for Moe valuing his friend's life above all else. Lucius berates Moe for failing to deliver even one round of boxing but pays him $100,000 anyway. Moe flies off with the paramotor to help people around the world, ignoring the Fan Man's shouted demands to return the equipment.

== Production ==
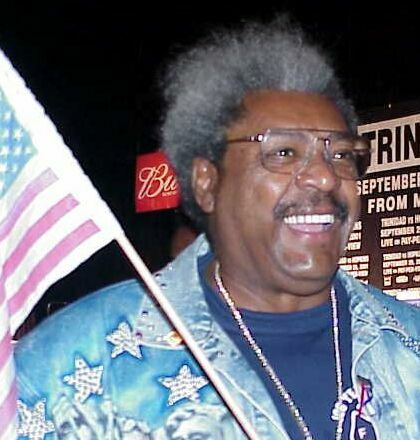
Character Lucius Sweet is a parody of boxing promoter Don King.

The episode was written by Jonathan Collier, who is a huge boxing fan. Knowing that the people on the internet would "give them grief", the writers went to a lot of effort to explain how Homer would be able to challenge for the heavyweight title. A lot of the scenes involving Homer fighting hobos were pitched by John Swartzwelder. Lucius Sweet is a parody of boxing promoter Don King, and is voiced by Paul Winfield, who had previously played King in HBO's 1995 biopic Tyson. In the script, Sweet was described as "A Don King type who looks and sounds exactly like Don King". The similarity is even pointed out by Homer with the line, "He is exactly as rich and as famous as Don King – and he looks just like him, too!" King was asked to guest star but turned the part down. Drederick Tatum is a parody of Mike Tyson. The name came from George Meyer, who went to high school with a boy named Drederick Timmins, which Meyer thought was a cool name. Tatum having done time in prison is a reference to the fact that, at the time of the episode's production, Tyson had just recently been released from prison after serving three years for rape. Homer is at one point referred to as "The Southern Dandy" as a reference to the old-time boxers and wrestlers who had similar nicknames.

In preparation for this episode, Mark Kirkland watched several boxing films and is satisfied with how it turned out. Whenever designing rooms, Kirkland tries to show a bare lightbulb because he feels that it makes things more depressing. In the scene in Moe's office, there is a brief shot of a poster advertising "Szyslak Vs. Oakley" and "Kirkland Vs. Silverman", referring to then-executive producer Bill Oakley and The Simpsons directors Mark Kirkland and David Silverman. The scene where Tatum is walking to the ring surrounded by shady characters is based on a real life photo of Tyson.

The fathers of Jimbo, Dolph and Kearney make their first and only appearances in the history of the show.

== Cultural references ==
The title is a reference to the Humphrey Bogart film The Harder They Fall. The episode opens with a parody of Bonanza. The montage of Homer fighting various hobos was based on a similar montage in Raging Bull. The music is inspired by "The Flower Duet" from the opera Lakmé by Léo Delibes. During the montage, there is a brief parody of the George Bellows painting "Dempsey and Firpo". The "Fan Man" is based on James Miller, a man famous for parachuting into arenas during big events. Homer's walk-out music is "Why Can't We Be Friends?" by War and Tatum's is "Time 4 Sum Axion" by Redman, which was also used by Tyson for his first fight after his release from prison in 1995. The song heard over the end credits is a rendition of Barbra Streisand's "People", sung by Sally Stevens.

== Reception ==
In its original broadcast, "The Homer They Fall" finished 29th in ratings for the week of November 4–10, 1996, with a Nielsen rating of 10.0, equivalent to approximately 9.7 million viewing households. It was the second highest-rated show on the Fox network that week, following The X-Files.

In response to the season fourteen episode "Barting Over", which is about skateboarding, Raju Mudhar of the Toronto Star listed what he thought were "excellent" episodes of The Simpsons and scenes also related to sports. He included "The Homer They Fall", writing that Drederick Tatum is "a thinly veiled Mike Tyson parody who's made cameos over the years".

Similarly, in 2004 ESPN.com released a list of the Top 100 Simpsons sport moments, ranking the entire episode at #2, saying, "Greatest sports introduction ever: In the Tatum fight, Homer is introduced as the Brick Hithouse (and is also known as the Southern Dandy), and his walk-to-the-ring music is 'Why Can't We Be Friends?'" Drederick Tatum was placed at the eighteenth spot on the list. Conversely, the authors of the book I Can't Believe It's a Bigger and Better Updated Unofficial Simpsons Guide, Gary Russell and Gareth Roberts, called it "the dullest, one-joke episode of the entire series". Kyle Fowler writes "when Moe eventually flies into the ring via giant fan, it’s not only a touching moment because of how concerned we are for Homer, but it’s also a final stand for morality and dignity. The fact that ring announcer Michael Buffer says, 'whatever dignity remained in boxing is literally flying out the window' only serves to drive that point home. 'The Homer They Fall' is the kind of episode we most often associate with the earliest seasons of The Simpsons, because it boasts a streamlined narrative, is filled with subtle one-liners, and uses those tools to substantiate a cultural critique while adding in a huge dose of heart. Turns out that cactus was right; sometimes you have to fight back, even if it’s not with your fists."
