= In Marge We Trust =

- The Simpsons episode
- Episode no.: Season 8 Episode 22
- Directed by: Steven Dean Moore
- Written by: Donick Cary
- Production code: 4F18
- Original air date: April 27, 1997

Guest appearances
- Sab Shimono as Mr. Sparkle; Gedde Watanabe as the Factory worker; Karen Maruyama and Denice Kumagai as dancers; Frank Welker as the Baboons

Episode features
- Couch gag: The couch is absent. In its place is a vending machine, which drops a couch from the ceiling onto Homer.
- Commentary: Matt Groening; Josh Weinstein; Donick Cary; Yeardley Smith; Steven Dean Moore; David X. Cohen; Alex Rocco

Episode chronology
← Previous "The Old Man and the Lisa"	Next → "Homer's Enemy"
- The Simpsons season 8

"In Marge We Trust" is the twenty-second episode of the eighth season of the American animated television series The Simpsons. It originally aired on the Fox network in the United States on April 27, 1997. It was the first episode of the series written by Donick Cary and was directed by Steven Dean Moore. The episode guest stars Sab Shimono as Mr. Sparkle, Gedde Watanabe as the factory worker, Denice Kumagai and Karen Maruyama as dancers, and Frank Welker as the baboons. In this episode, Marge replaces Reverend Lovejoy as the town's moral adviser, while Homer investigates why his face appears on a Japanese detergent box.

In its original broadcast, the episode was watched by approximately 9.8 million households, with a Nielsen rating of 10.1, and was the third-highest-rated show on Fox that week. The episode received critical acclaim for both story arcs, and was noted for its subtle humor contrasting with the surreal Mr. Sparkle ad.

== Plot ==
After Reverend Lovejoy's sermon bores his congregation, Marge voices her concern over his lack of enthusiasm about helping people. Lovejoy explains that his passion faded as he dealt with Ned Flanders's constant trivial problems since the first day he served as Springfield's reverend. Marge begins working for the Church as the "Listen Lady", listening to people's problems and helping solve them. Lovejoy realizes his inadequacy and feels depressed; visions of the saints depicted in the church's stained-glass windows chastise him for doing little to inspire his congregation.

Homer takes Bart and Lisa to dispose of their Christmas tree at the Springfield dump, where they find a box of Japanese dishwasher detergent, Mr. Sparkle, whose mascot resembles Homer. Disturbed, Homer contacts the manufacturer in Hokkaidō, Japan. Homer is sent a promotional video that reveals that the mascot is a result of a joint venture between two conglomerates, whose mascots, a fish and a lightbulb, merge to form Mr. Sparkle; the similarity to Homer is a mere coincidence.

Ned telephones Marge for help: the delinquents Jimbo, Dolph and Kearney are loitering outside his store, the Leftorium. At her suggestion, he tries to shoo them away, but they harass him. Ned calls Marge again, but when the bullies cut the phone cord, Marge assumes that Ned has hung up and that everything is fine. The next morning, Maude informs Marge that Ned is missing. Marge goes to Lovejoy for help, and they track Ned to the zoo, where Japanese tourists think Homer is Mr. Sparkle. Lovejoy rescues Ned from the baboon enclosure and rediscovers his passion for his career, regaling his congregation with the tale of Ned's rescue.

== Production ==
By season eight, the show had begun to explore episodes revolving around secondary characters. Reverend Lovejoy was selected for this episode because, aside from being noted as "the priest who didn't care", he had not had much character development. This was the first episode that Donick Cary wrote for The Simpsons. He was disappointed that his first story was about "Marge's crisis with faith."

The trip to the dump was inspired by Cary's youth, in which he would often go "dump picking". This led to the writers deciding to have Homer's face on a discarded box, which became the Mr. Sparkle subplot. To help create the advertisement, the writers watched videos of many Japanese commercials. The solution for how Mr. Sparkle resembles Homer was written by George Meyer, after hours of time had been spent trying to come up with a realistic ending. Matsumura Fishworks was named after Ichiro Matsumura, a friend of David X. Cohen.

An original scene from Lovejoy's flashback showed that Jasper Beardsley preceded him as minister of the First Church of Springfield. After her lines in this episode were recorded, Yeardley Smith caught the flu, so creator Matt Groening decided to let her stay at home, so he had a plan to make Smith record her lines at home and convinced the crew to make her record brief lines for the next two episodes. Afterwards, Smith felt better in time for recording sessions of "The Secret War of Lisa Simpson".

== Reception ==
In its original broadcast, "In Marge We Trust" finished 25th in ratings for the week of April 21–27, 1997, with a Nielsen rating of 10.1, equivalent to approximately 9.8 million viewing households. It was the third-highest-rated show on the Fox network that week, following The X-Files and King of the Hill. In Australia, the episode premiered on June 22, 1997, while in the UK it premiered on July 20, 1997.

The episode received critical acclaim. Authors of the book I Can't Believe It's a Bigger and Better Updated Unofficial Simpsons Guide, Warren Martyn and Adrian Wood, said: "A rare case of both storylines being worthy of full episodes in their own right, this is a cracking episode which highlights the unduly neglected Rev. Lovejoy and makes you realize Homer isn't the only one ready to kill Ned Flanders! Great stuff." The A.V. Club found the episode to be a "beautiful ... change of pace" from the show's usual ridiculousness, noting its subtle humour and character development: "There's a, well, constancy to all that we learn about Reverend Lovejoy that means 'In Marge We Trust' gives us one of the most compressed character arcs in the show's history" and how Homer responds with "paranoid disquiet" instead of his usual anger and violence. It described the Mr. Sparkle ad as "a giddy explosion of surrealism" in the relatively realistic episode, "perfectly constructed nonsense in which every little scene is utterly insane yet flows with perfect anti-logic from what preceded it."

In a 2000 Entertainment Weekly article, Matt Groening ranked it as his fifth favorite in the history of the show: "Even by Simpsons standards, this is a peculiar episode: Homer freaks out when he finds a Japanese Mr. Sparkle soap box that bears his likeness. ('For lucky best wash, use Mr. Sparkle!') I can’t remember how we get there, but the show ends with Reverend Lovejoy saving Ned Flanders from several crazed zoo baboons." Josh Weinstein described it as one of the best of the season, as well as being one of the most underrated episodes of all time. He also described the Mr. Sparkle commercial as his all-time favorite sequence.

The Fruity Oaty Bar commercial from the film Serenity was partially inspired by the Mr. Sparkle advertisement.

Since 2009, the show's opening sequence includes Mr. Sparkle detergent with Marge's supermarket purchases. Comedian Eric Andre was a guest on The Last Laugh podcast and cited the episode as his favorite and "the hardest [he] had ever laughed" at anything on television.
