= Mountain of Madness =

- The Simpsons episode
- Episode no.: Season 8 Episode 12
- Directed by: Mark Kirkland
- Written by: John Swartzwelder
- Production code: 4F10
- Original air date: February 2, 1997

Episode features
- Couch gag: The couch is folded out into a bed with Grampa asleep on it. The Simpsons fold him into the couch (with Grampa shouting "Huh?" before he's folded in) and sit down as normal.
- Commentary: Matt Groening; Josh Weinstein; Dan Castellaneta; Dave Thomas (as "Jim Denton"); Mark Kirkland; David Silverman

Episode chronology
← Previous "The Twisted World of Marge Simpson"	Next → "Simpsoncalifragilisticexpiala(Annoyed Grunt)cious"
- The Simpsons season 8

"Mountain of Madness" (originally titled "The Most Excellent Snowy Mountain Adventure") is the twelfth episode of the eighth season of the American animated television series The Simpsons. It originally aired on the Fox network in the United States on February 2, 1997. In the episode, Mr. Burns forces his employees of the Springfield Nuclear Power Plant to go for a team-building hike in the mountains. Burns and Homer are paired together and trapped in a cabin that gets buried by several avalanches.

"Mountain of Madness" was directed by Mark Kirkland and written by John Swartzwelder. Swartzwelder's script underwent many rewrites, during which the story was completely rewritten from scratch. Several new designs and backgrounds had to be created for the wilderness scenes. The episode received mostly positive reviews.

== Plot ==
During a fire drill at the Springfield Nuclear Power Plant, the employees panic and fail to evacuate the plant within 15 minutes. Outraged, Mr. Burns announces his workers must compete in a team-building exercise at a snow-covered mountain retreat. Due to a misunderstanding, Homer brings his family along, mistaking the team-building exercise for a vacation. The employees must work in pairs: Homer is partnered with Burns, while Smithers competes alone due to an odd number of participants (having originally thought the drawing was rigged so that he and Burns would be team-mates). The goal is to reach a cabin at the mountaintop, which contains food and champagne; the second last team will get a "World's Worst Employee" trophy, while the last team to arrive will be fired.

Burns persuades Homer to cheat by using a snowmobile to reach the cabin. Arriving early, they enjoy the comfortable surroundings and each other's company. They clink their champagne glasses and inadvertently cause an avalanche that buries the entire cabin. Burns attempts to contact the outside world with a telegraph, to no avail. Burns and Homer also try to dig out of the snow-covered cabin, which causes more avalanches. Homer and Burns start blaming each other for causing the avalanches. They realize it may take days to be rescued and pass the time by playing games and building snowmen dressed in their clothes. Meanwhile, Bart and Lisa attempt to help Smithers get to the cabin, but inadvertently waste time looking for food and searching for gold and finding injured animals, much to Smithers' dismay. Lenny and Carl arrive at the right spot but find the cabin gone and unaware it is buried beneath them, so they leave. The other employees reach a ranger station, thinking it is their destination. When the workers realize that Homer and Burns have yet to arrive, they suspect something bad has happened to them. After a few hours in the cabin, Homer and Burns are beset by cabin fever and have paranoid thoughts. After a vicious struggle, Burns accidentally ignites the propane tank, launching the building from the snow and propelling it toward the workers, who are preparing a rescue operation.

When the fuel is spent, the cabin comes to a halt just feet from hitting the ranger station, and Burns and Homer emerge cold and disheveled. Burns reminds everyone of the contest, so the workers rush inside. Lenny is fired after being the last person in the cabin. After, Burns realizes his workers have learned the value of teamwork and announces that no one will be fired after all. Lenny prepares to harangue Burns for firing him, but falls in a pit of snow. The workers and Homer's family celebrate their shared victory while Homer and Burns eye each other suspiciously.

== Production ==
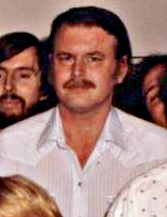
John Swartzwelder wrote the episode

The script for "Mountain of Madness" is credited to John Swartzwelder, although it underwent many rewrites. According to Josh Weinstein, "a Swartzwelder script is like a finely tooled crazy German machine and if you have the wrong engineers try to fix it, it blows up. And that's the thing, 'cause it had great jokes but we sort of changed the story and went through a bunch of drafts." The story was completely rewritten and as a result, the plot became odder and quirkier with the scenes of paranoia deriving from this. The original script was "really crazy" but a lot of the more insane material was cut. However, most of the rewrites were done during the script-writing and did not require any major animation changes. One change was the ending, which was added after the animatic. The episode features several pairings of established characters who had previously interacted little, such as Waylon Smithers with Bart and Lisa. Weinstein feels that this was one of the first episodes to notably develop Lenny and Carl as a duo.

The episode was directed by Mark Kirkland and a lot of new designs and backgrounds had to be created for the wilderness scenes. The backgrounds were designed by animator Debbie Silver. The design of the forest ranger was based on then-Vice President Al Gore. In the episode, Marge watches an old film which includes a comment from naturalist John Muir. The impression of Muir was done by Dan Castellaneta, who originally based the voice on an impersonator he met at Yosemite National Park. However, the producers asked him to make the voice older and crazier.

== Reception ==
In its original broadcast, "Mountain of Madness" finished 26th in ratings for the week of January 27-February 2, 1997, with a Nielsen rating of 10.5, equivalent to approximately 10.2 million viewing households. It was the fourth-highest-rated show on the Fox network that week, following The X-Files, World's Scariest Police Chases, and King of the Hill.

Since airing, the episode has received mostly positive reviews from television critics.

The authors of the book I Can't Believe It's a Bigger and Better Updated Unofficial Simpsons Guide, Gary Russell and Gareth Roberts, called it "an inventive episode, with several memorable moments". Tim Raynor of DVDTown.com said there are some "good, sidesplitting moments to say the least for this witty episode". DVD Movie Guide's Colin Jacobson called the episode "a good show" and praised it for the "snowy setting [that] allows the other characters to expand as well".
