= Lisa's Date with Density =

- The Simpsons episode
- Lisa and Nelson on a picnic date.
- Episode no.: Season 8 Episode 7
- Directed by: Susie Dietter
- Written by: Mike Scully
- Production code: 4F01
- Original air date: December 15, 1996

Episode features
- Chalkboard gag: Lisa writes "I will not be a snickerpuss" during the episode.
- Couch gag: The living room is upside down, and after the family sits down, they fall off.
- Commentary: Matt Groening; Josh Weinstein; Mike Scully; Nancy Cartwright; Yeardley Smith; Susie Dietter; Alex Rocco

Episode chronology
← Previous "A Milhouse Divided"	Next → "Hurricane Neddy"
- The Simpsons season 8

"Lisa's Date with Density" is the seventh episode of the eighth season of the American animated television series The Simpsons. It originally aired on the Fox network in the United States on December 15, 1996. It was written by Mike Scully and directed by Susie Dietter. The episode sees Lisa develop a crush on Nelson Muntz. When they start dating and Lisa is unable to reform him, she ends their relationship. In the subplot, Homer uses an autodialer in a telemarketing scheme that annoys all of Springfield's residents.

== Plot ==
Superintendent Chalmers visits Principal Skinner at Springfield Elementary School to show off his newly purchased second-hand Honda Accord, only to discover the car's hood ornament has suddenly gone missing. Skinner orders a search of every student's locker which reveals that Nelson Muntz, the school bully, is the culprit. As punishment, Nelson is forced to return all stolen items found in his locker to their owners and perform janitorial work with Groundskeeper Willie.

Lisa is caught staring at Nelson during band practice and unwittingly causes a commotion among the band students, earning her detention during which she is forced to write lines on the chalkboard. After Nelson recommends using an aid for writing musical notation to get through her punishment faster, she realizes she has developed a crush on him. She asks Milhouse to pass a love note to him in class, but Nelson, thinking Milhouse wrote the love note, beats him up. After Milhouse is taken to the hospital, Lisa confesses to Nelson that she wrote the note and soon she spends more time with him, inviting him to her house and even visiting Nelson's own.

At Marge's suggestion, Lisa decides to turn Nelson from a troublemaker into a sweet, well-behaved young man like how Marge had done with Homer. Lisa compels Nelson to start dressing more sharply and then takes him to the Springfield Observatory for a date. To distract Lisa, Nelson kisses her, but finds he has fallen for her in the process. However, the influence of his friends Jimbo, Dolph and Kearney prevails when they convince him to vandalize Principal Skinner's house later that night. After Skinner calls the police, the four boys flee; Nelson gains refuge in the Simpson house by telling Lisa that he is innocent, which she believes at first. However, Nelson accidentally admits his involvement the next day, and Lisa gently breaks up with him after realizing that he hasn't changed at all. On her way home, she runs into Milhouse, who is delighted to hear that she's no longer seeing Nelson.

In the subplot, Chief Wiggum arrests a scam artist for fraudulent robocalling. Homer witnesses the arrest and retrieves the discarded autodialer from a trash bin. He uses the machine for a telemarketing scheme to persuade everyone to send him money under the name "Happy Dude". His phone calls annoy the whole town and Chief Wiggum catches him. Instead of confiscating the autodialer and taking Homer into custody, he shoots it and asks Homer to bring it to his court hearing, lest the charges be dismissed for lack of evidence. In the closing credits, the repaired autodialer plays Homer's new, court-ordered message asking residents to forgive him; he ends the message with yet another money beg, this time to "Sorry Dude".

== Production ==
The idea of Lisa dating Nelson had been around for a while, with several different versions being pitched. The writers wanted a "silly" Homer story to balance the episode out, and the idea of using the telemarketing scam for this had also been around for a while. By this time, the show had begun to have episodes revolving around secondary characters. This was the first episode to revolve around Nelson, and was done to partly explain why Nelson acts the way he does. The words to Nelson's song were contributed by Mike Scully's daughters. The scene in which Milhouse passes Lisa's note to Nelson was written by Bill Oakley, with the line, "He can't hear you, we had to pack his ears with gauze", being George Meyer's line. There was a debate as to how injured Milhouse should look without it looking disturbing, and the drop of blood coming from his nose was decided to be enough. Milhouse liking Vaseline on toast was based on a child from Josh Weinstein's school days who everyday would get onto the bus with a piece of toast, which had Vaseline on it.

== Cultural references ==
A majority of the story is a reference to the film Rebel Without a Cause. Lisa remarks that Nelson is "like a riddle wrapped in an enigma wrapped in a vest", a reference to "a riddle wrapped in a mystery inside an enigma"; this was Winston Churchill's opinion of Russia at the outbreak of World War II. The episode title's use of the word "density" to mean "destiny" is a reference to a line from the film Back to the Future.

== Reception ==
In its original broadcast, "Lisa's Date with Density" finished 63rd in ratings for the week of December 9–15, 1996, with a Nielsen rating of 7.4, equivalent to approximately 7.2 million viewing households. It was the fifth-highest-rated show on the Fox network that week, following The X-Files, Melrose Place, Beverly Hills, 90210 and Party of Five.

The authors of the book I Can't Believe It's a Bigger and Better Updated Unofficial Simpsons Guide, Gary Russell and Gareth Roberts, called it "impressive" how "even after Nelson has beaten [Milhouse] up for apparently making a pass, [Milhouse] will still do anything for uncaring Lisa."

Josh Weinstein called it one of the most "real" episodes, commenting that every character in the episode, from Superintendent Chalmers to Lisa, acts like a real person throughout. The medic's line "He can't hear you now; we had to pack his ears with gauze" is one of Matt Groening's favorites. Marge's line "When I first met your father, he was loud, crude and piggish. But I worked hard on him, and now he's a whole new person", is one of Susie Dietter's favorites, as it explains why Marge is still married to Homer despite his actions.

Yeardley Smith, the voice actress of Lisa, has mentioned this episode is one of her favorite Simpsons episodes of all time.

This is also one of several episodes that has been performed live by the cast in front of an audience.
