= A Milhouse Divided =

- The Simpsons episode
- Episode no.: Season 8 Episode 6
- Directed by: Steven Dean Moore
- Written by: Steve Tompkins
- Production code: 4F04
- Original air date: December 1, 1996

Episode features
- Couch gag: The family sits down, but Bart is green. Homer fiddles with the TV and Bart changes to red. Homer then returns to the couch and smacks Bart behind the head, returning him to his normal yellow color.
- Commentary: Matt Groening; Bill Oakley; Josh Weinstein; Steve Tompkins; Steven Dean Moore

Episode chronology
← Previous "Bart After Dark"	Next → "Lisa's Date with Density"
- The Simpsons season 8

"A Milhouse Divided" is the sixth episode of the eighth season of the American animated television series The Simpsons. It originally aired on the Fox Network in the United States on December 1, 1996. In the episode, Milhouse's parents, Kirk and Luann, get a divorce, causing Homer to reflect on his own marriage. It was directed by Steven Dean Moore and is the only episode for which Steve Tompkins has sole writing credit.

== Plot ==
Marge invites the Flanderses, the Lovejoys, the Hibberts and the Van Houtens to a dinner party. While the other guests enjoy themselves, Kirk and Luann Van Houten bicker. They get more quarrelsome as the party continues, making the other guests uncomfortable. After a volatile game of Pictionary, Luann demands a divorce on Kirk.

Kirk moves into an apartment complex and gets fired from his job at the cracker factory because his boss (who turns out to be Luann's father) predicts that Kirk's recent divorce will tarnish the company's reputation, seeing crackers as "A family food." Luann gains custody of Milhouse and quickly adjusts to life as a single parent. Luann begins a romantic relationship with Chase, an American Gladiator.

At Moe's, Kirk reveals to Homer that he has decided to pursue a singing career and introduces him to his new "girlfriend" Starla, who soon steals his car and tosses his demo tape onto the street. Kirk muses that he never saw the divorce coming and regrets being a bad husband, remarking that "one day your wife is making you your favorite meal, the next day you're thawing a hot dog in a gas station sink". Homer tries to console Kirk and boasts that his marriage to Marge is rock-solid. At home, however, Homer discovers that Marge has gone out and left him hot dogs for dinner, and becomes terrified that Marge is going to leave him.

Homer enlists Lisa's help to save his marriage, but she is unable to offer any advice beyond observing that he is lucky to have Marge as his wife. Homer recalls their wedding at a seedy, rural chapel; later that night, Homer had bought Marge a cake with an unintentionally unflattering message written on it. To save their marriage, Homer attempts to perform "romantic" gestures for Marge such as giving her a new haircut and making soothing noises as she sleeps, which only annoy her.

Deciding that Marge deserves a fresh start, Homer secretly files for divorce. Marge returns home that night and is surprised to find all of the Simpsons' friends gathered in the living room. Homer declares that he wants to be remarried, with a perfect wedding this time. Reverend Lovejoy reads the rambling wedding vows Homer has written, and Marge and Homer are remarried. Later at the party, Kirk tries to reconcile with Luann by singing her a corny love song from his demo tape. Though Luann appears touched at first, she rebuffs Kirk instantly when he asks her to remarry him, and Chase kicks Kirk out of the house.

== Production ==
"A Milhouse Divided" is the only episode for which Steve Tompkins has sole writing credit, although he had been a part of the writing staff for several years. The writers wanted to do an episode that involved a couple getting divorced. The Van Houtens were chosen because the writers felt that they were the most developed couple next to Marge and Homer and the Lovejoys. The scene in the episode "Sideshow Bob's Last Gleaming" where Milhouse is in a jet pretending to fire missiles at his parents is where they got the idea to have his parents' marriage be in trouble. A deleted scene involving Kirk's firing from the cracker factory had him trying to save his job by apologizing for crying repeatedly at business meetings, along with Kirk revealing that his severance package consisted of a box of crackers (which birds attempted to take away from him when he went to his car after being fired).

Originally, the episode also focused on the divorce's effects on Milhouse and there was a subplot that involved Bart being jealous of Milhouse and wishing that Marge and Homer would also separate. Several scenes were written and animated for the episode, but ultimately, they were cut because the script was very long. A similar idea would go on to be used as a plot point in the season 17 episode "Milhouse of Sand and Fog". The third act of the episode shifts the focus from the Van Houtens to Homer and Marge because the writers felt that tertiary characters could not carry an audience's interest for an entire episode. Bill Oakley has said that he felt the episode would have failed had they stuck with the Van Houtens for the third act and most of the other writers also felt that it was the right move.

The idea for the dinner party came from Oakley, who had wanted to have a party similar to the one in "The War of the Simpsons". For the second half of the episode, Luann was redesigned to look more youthful and was given a new outfit. A big name singer was originally sought to sing "Can I Borrow a Feeling?" over the end credits. The writers wanted Sheryl Crow, but she declined and the concept was later dropped.

== Reception ==
In its original broadcast, "A Milhouse Divided" finished tied for 50th in the weekly ratings for the week of November 25 – December 1, 1996, with a Nielsen rating of 8.3 and was viewed in 8 million homes. It was the fourth-highest-rated show on the Fox Network that week.

Since airing, the episode has received positive reviews. Gary Russell and Gareth Roberts, the authors of the book I Can't Believe It's a Bigger and Better Updated Unofficial Simpsons Guide, called it "More drama than comedy, and very honest in its dealings with the Van Houtens' divorce and its effects on Milhouse." In 2022, Chris Lough, writing for Fatherly magazine, said that "in one of The Simpsons' most amazing episodes ever, Milhouse's parents got divorced."

A store appearing in the episode was named "Stoner's Pot Palace." In addition to appearing in other Simpsons media since, the name "Stoners Pot Palace" would later be used in a computer worm targeting Windows 9x platforms named "Marijuana."

In 2018, a scene from the episode where Bart hits Homer with a chair (replicating a stunt Luanne's new boyfriend Chase showed him) while taking a bath has become an internet meme.
