= The Secret War of Lisa Simpson =

- The Simpsons episode
- Episode no.: Season 8 Episode 25
- Directed by: Mike B. Anderson
- Written by: Richard Appel
- Production code: 4F21
- Original air date: May 18, 1997

Guest appearance
- Willem Dafoe as the Commandant

Episode features
- Couch gag: The living room is shown upside down. The Simpsons sit down, but fall to the floor (the true ceiling).
- Commentary: Matt Groening; Josh Weinstein; Yeardley Smith; Mike B. Anderson

Episode chronology
← Previous "The Simpsons Spin-Off Showcase"	Next → "The City of New York vs. Homer Simpson"
- The Simpsons season 8

"The Secret War of Lisa Simpson" is the twenty-fifth episode and the season finale of the eighth season of the American animated television series The Simpsons. It first aired on the Fox network in the United States on May 18, 1997. Bart gets sent to a military academy as punishment for bad behavior. While visiting the academy, Lisa sees that the school is far more challenging than hers and she decides that she wants to attend as well. It was directed by Mike B. Anderson, written by Richard Appel and featured Willem Dafoe in a guest spot as the school's commandant.

== Plot ==
Bart's class goes on a field trip to the Springfield Police Department, where Bart finds a room with several megaphones. By placing them all end-to-end and speaking into one, he amplifies his voice enough to create a sonic shock wave that shatters all the glass in Springfield. Chief Wiggum suggests sending Bart to military school to correct his behavior. After a day watching mind-numbing videos in class, Lisa worries that her education is not challenging enough. Under the trick they are going to Disneyland, the Simpsons drive Bart to Rommelwood Military School; while visiting a poetry class, Lisa decides to enroll as well in order to experience the challenge she seeks. Homer and Marge reluctantly agree to her plan and depart, refusing Bart's pleas to let him come home.

As the school's first female cadet, Lisa is assigned a barracks to herself, angering the corps of cadets. After she and Bart endure hazing, Bart is eventually accepted by the other cadets and distances himself from his sister. Lonely and realizing her mistake, Lisa considers going home, but decides to see it through to the end. As the school year comes to a close, the Commandant reveals the final test for the students: the "Eliminator", a hand-over-hand crawl across a rope suspended high above thorn bushes. Lisa fears she will not be able to complete the task, but Bart helps her train in secret.

On the day of the test, Lisa is the last to cross the Eliminator. She loses her grip on the rope and is in danger of falling as the cadets jeer her, but Bart cheers her on and she successfully completes the task. The enraged cadets are unable to make the rest of the semester unbearable for Bart, because their graduation ceremony is only three hours away. The Commandant awards Lisa a medal engraved "For Satisfactory Completion of the Second Grade". Homer and Marge drive Lisa and Bart to the dentist's office, once again under the prank of supposedly going to Disneyland.

== Production ==
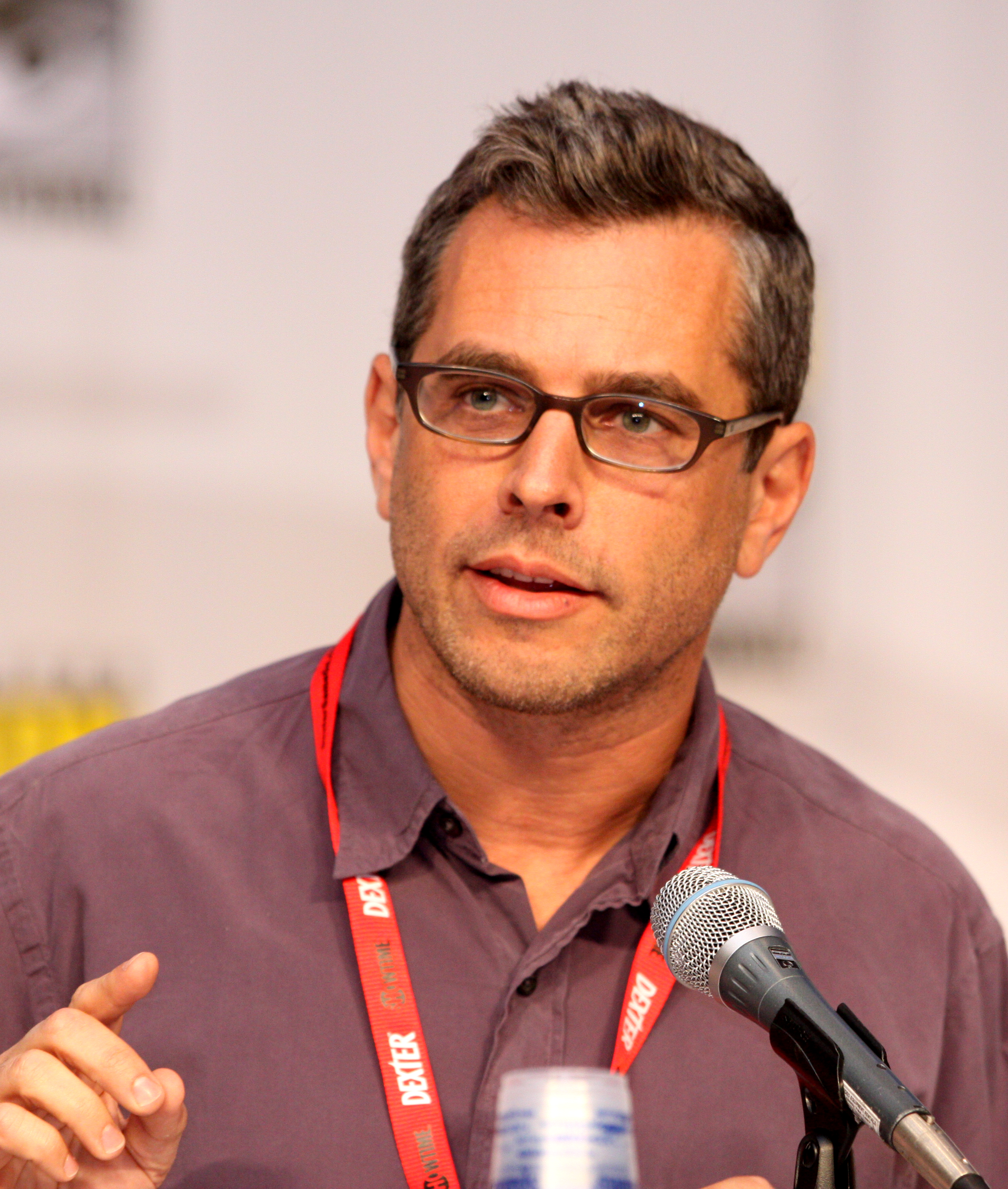
Richard Appel wrote the episode.

The episode was written by Richard Appel, but the idea of Bart and Lisa Simpson attending a military academy had previously been pitched and had been floating around for The Simpsons since 1991. The idea had not yet been used as an episode plot, because the writers had not felt comfortable with taking Bart and Lisa to a strange place early in the series. Because this is the season finale, Yeardley Smith returned to the series for the first time since "In Marge We Trust" since she caught the flu after recording her lines in that episode, despite having brief lines recorded at home and being credited in the previous episodes "Homer's Enemy" and "The Simpsons Spin-Off Showcase".

During the scene where the Commandant is talking, there is a brief shot of Lisa blinking. As there had been an error in the final print of the episode, the shot was animated, painted and shot on May 16, 1997, the Friday before the episode's airdate. The spiky blond-haired boy, who runs towards the Eliminator while screaming, is a caricature of director Mike B. Anderson.

== Reception ==
The episode originally aired on May 18, 1997, as the season finale, along with a rerun of "The Springfield Files." The episode was mistakenly anticipated by some as being about Lisa launching "a legal battle" to enroll at the military school. In its original broadcast, "The Secret War of Lisa Simpson" finished 47th in ratings for the week of May 12–18, 1997, with a Nielsen rating of 8.3, equivalent to approximately 8.1 million viewing households. It was the second highest-rated show on the Fox network that week, following The X-Files.

Gary Russell and Gareth Roberts, the authors of the book I Can't Believe It's a Bigger and Better Updated Unofficial Simpsons Guide, disliked the episode, writing that it was "very dull" and that Dafoe was not used well. However, Dafoe is one of show runner Josh Weinstein's favorite guest stars. Ian Johnson argued Dafoe's casting was "rare" and "somewhat offbeat".

Journalist Raju Mudhar also wrote that in this episode, "The Simpsons have succinctly laid out our eventual future." This referred to the rise of robots in the real world and the quote from this episode:

"The wars of the future will not be fought on the battlefield or at sea. They will be fought in space, or possibly on top of a very tall mountain. In either case, most of the actual fighting will be done by small robots. And as you go forth today remember always your duty is clear: To build and maintain those robots."

In the episode Marge sends a recording of herself singing "You Are My Sunshine" to Lisa. Sam Scott of Looper called it "one of the most powerful moments of melancholy beauty in a series that got them down to an art form."

== Merchandise ==
The episode was one of four in 1999 released on a VHS (Re-released on DVD in 2005) called Bart Wars focused on crosses between The Simpsons and Star Wars. However, one critic wrote that with this episode and "Marge Be Not Proud" and "Dog of Death," both of which are also on the DVD, the "Star Wars connection" is "tangential at best."
