= The Old Man and the Lisa =

- The Simpsons episode
- Episode no.: Season 8 Episode 21
- Directed by: Mark Kirkland
- Written by: John Swartzwelder
- Production code: 4F17
- Original air date: April 20, 1997

Guest appearance
- Bret Hart as himself

Episode features
- Couch gag: The Simpsons' couch becomes a giant Whac-A-Mole game, with Homer getting hit.
- Commentary: Matt Groening; Josh Weinstein; Dan Castellaneta; Yeardley Smith; Mark Kirkland; David X. Cohen; George Meyer

Episode chronology
← Previous "The Canine Mutiny"	Next → "In Marge We Trust"
- The Simpsons season 8

"The Old Man and the Lisa" is the twenty-first episode of the eighth season of the American animated television series The Simpsons. It first aired on the Fox network in the United States on April 20, 1997. In this episode, Mr. Burns goes bankrupt and asks Lisa to help him get rich again. She agrees on the condition that he change his evil ways. They earn money by recycling cans and soon Burns has enough money to start his own recycling plant. Lisa is aghast when she learns the plant, "L'il Lisa Slurry", makes a slurry from liquefied sea creatures. When Burns sells the plant to a company that makes fish sticks for $120,000,000, he offers Lisa 10 percent of his profits, but she declines for ethical reasons, causing Homer to have four simultaneous heart attacks.

The episode was directed by Mark Kirkland and written by John Swartzwelder. The writing staff had thought about an episode in which Mr. Burns would lose his money and would have to interact with the outside world. In DVD commentary, the writers explained that while Mr. Burns tried to change, he "couldn't help being himself". Professional wrestler Bret Hart made a cameo as himself, animated in his pink wrestling outfit. "The Old Man and the Lisa" contains cultural references to the television series That Girl and the film Invasion of the Body Snatchers. It was positively received by critics and won the Environmental Media Award for "TV Episodic Comedy".

== Plot ==
Lisa collects recyclables to earn money for the Junior Achievers Club school trip to Albany. Mr. Burns speaks to the club at Springfield Elementary School, scoffing when Lisa suggests his nuclear power plant start a recycling program. When Burns boasts that he would not be filthy rich if he listened to nature lovers like her, Lisa counters that his net worth is only half what he claims. When pressed, Smithers reluctantly tells Burns he has considerably less money even than that.

Burns soon realizes he is nearly broke because his sycophantic advisers tell him only what he wants to hear. He is oblivious to the 1929 stock market crash, neglecting to check his stock ticker since September 1929. He attempts to aggressively invest in what be believes are current blue chip stocks – but chooses companies selling outdated items like Zeppelins, Spats, Congreve rockets, and top hats – and goes bankrupt. The bank forecloses on the plant – putting Lenny in charge – and sells his mansion to pro wrestler Bret Hart. Meanwhile, Principal Skinner ends the Junior Achievers Club's recyclables collection after they are rewarded seventy-five cents for collecting half a ton of newspaper and knocking over the tree they saved with the recycled paper, but Lisa decides to continue regardless.

Burns moves in with Smithers and insists on being helpful, but Smithers insists that he relax after witnessing him accidentally smash crockery whilst trying to wash up. Left to his own devices, Burns decides to go grocery shopping. At the supermarket he is confused by the difference between ketchup and catsup, so the grocer commits him to the Springfield Retirement Castle, finding his brief time there monotonous. He sees Lisa again at the nursing home and begs her to help rebuild his empire. After incessant pleading, she agrees to help him earn money by recycling after he promises to change his evil ways.

Burns grabs every can he finds, eventually earning enough money to open his own recycling plant. He gives Lisa a tour of the plant, showing her the Burns Omni-Net – millions of six-pack holders fastened together to catch fish and sea creatures to make Li'l Lisa's Patented Animal Slurry. Lisa, a vegetarian and animal rights supporter, realizes he has not changed; when he tries to be good, he is even more evil, although he insists that he is providing a needed commodity. Lisa runs through the streets, unsuccessfully trying to stop seemingly brainwashed citizens from recycling.

Later, Burns tells Lisa that he has bought back the power plant by selling the recycling plant to a fish stick company for US$120 million, 10 percent of which is hers. Lisa refuses the money and rips up the check. This causes Homer to have four simultaneous heart attacks. At the hospital, Lisa apologizes to her dad for forfeiting the money. When he tells her that $12,000 would have been a godsend, Lisa tells him 10 percent of $120 million is actually $12 million. The hospital's public address system announces a code blue, indicating Homer has suffered cardiac arrest.

== Production ==
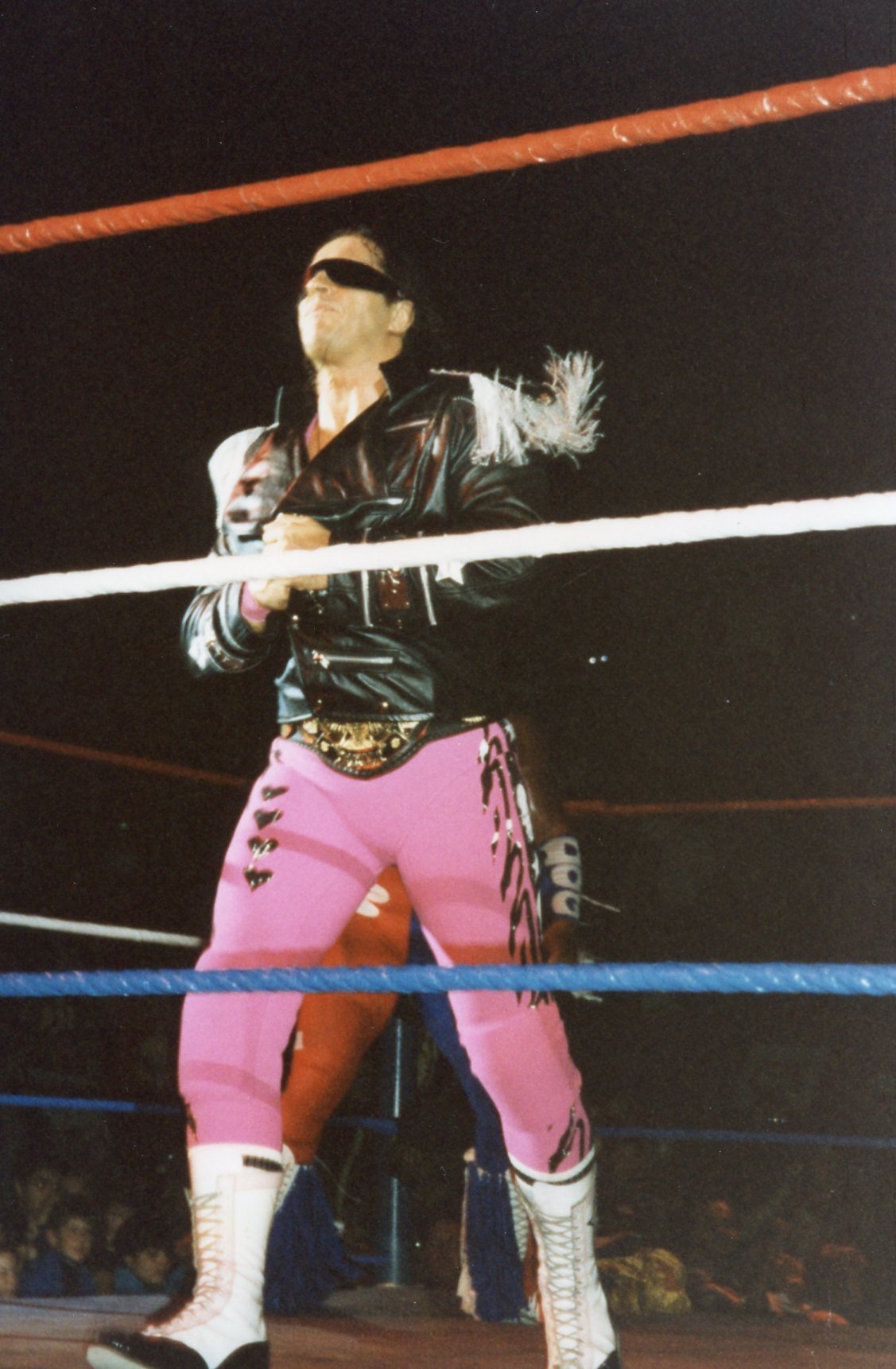
Guest voice Bret Hart insisted that his animated version in the episode would wear his pink wrestling outfit.

The episode was based on a story idea pitched by David X. Cohen, although it was written by John Swartzwelder, who had written many of the Simpsons episodes that have environmental themes. This habit led to him being called the "conscience of the staff" despite being a "self declared anti-environmentalist." It was because of this that he was given such episodes, because the staff felt that he would give them just the right amount of sarcasm. In the original script for the episode, he described the recycling center as "a couple of hippies surrounded by garbage". Two alternate original titles for the episode were Cohen's "Lisa and Burns" and Swartzwelder's "Burns Goes Broke".

The writers had wanted an episode where Burns becomes bankrupt and shows what Burns would be like as a person in the real world. The idea with the recycling plant was that Burns did not have any sort of evil plan and he just could not help being himself. Burns really was trying to change and this was reflected in the end when he tried to give Lisa her share of the profits, with Lisa refusing. Burns was drawn without his trademark scowl for this episode. The staff joked about this being a suitable series finale, due to the episode ending with Homer suffering from another heart attack after learning what 10% of Burns' $120,000,000 check really is.

Professional wrestler Bret Hart guest starred in the episode as himself, and he was very insistent that he be shown wearing his pink wrestling outfit. He explained that "It's so cool to be part of a show that makes people laugh really, really hard." In a 2009 interview with The A.V. Club's Dave Hofer, Hart explained that the reason why his animated counterpart sounds nothing like him was that initially, he was brought in to voice a generic wrestler. When Mark Kirkland realised how famous Hart actually was, he told Hart that if the artwork had not been started yet, he would be drawn in as himself.

== Cultural references ==
The title is a reference to Ernest Hemingway's The Old Man and the Sea. The recycling center is named "Uriah's Heap", a reference to Uriah Heap, a character in David Copperfield. Mr. Burns's walk through the supermarket was based on a false rumor that George H. W. Bush visited a store and was confused by the scanner and, in the original draft for the episode, Burns met Bush while shopping there. When bidding farewell to the hippie, Mr. Burns says "Shine On You Crazy Diamond", a reference to the Pink Floyd song of the same name. The hippie responds by saying that Burns needs to stop living in the past. The voice of the hippie is based on the character played by Dennis Hopper in Apocalypse Now. "Achy Breaky Heart", a song by Billy Ray Cyrus, is played at the old folks' home. The scene where Mr. Burns chases Lisa through the town is a spoof of the opening to the television series That Girl. The scene where Lisa runs through the streets proclaiming recycling as evil, spoofs the finales of Soylent Green and the original version of Invasion of the Body Snatchers.

== Reception ==
In its original broadcast, "The Old Man and the Lisa" finished 38th in ratings for the week of April 14–20, 1997, with a Nielsen rating of 8.3, equivalent to approximately 8.1 million viewing households. It was tied along with King of the Hill as the third highest-rated show on the Fox network that week, following The X-Files and Melrose Place.

"The Old Man and the Lisa" received the 1997 Environmental Media Award in the "TV Episodic Comedy" category.

Warren Martyn and Adrian Wood, the authors of the book I Can't Believe It's a Bigger and Better Updated Unofficial Simpsons Guide, called it "An odd episode with a not-too-unexpected outcome. The best bits are undoubtedly Burns learning his way around a supermarket and Lisa's realisation of what Burns has been up to."
