= The Twisted World of Marge Simpson =

- The Simpsons episode
- Episode no.: Season 8 Episode 11
- Directed by: Chuck Sheetz
- Written by: Jennifer Crittenden
- Production code: 4F08
- Original air date: January 19, 1997

Guest appearances
- Jack Lemmon as Frank Ormand; Joe Mantegna as Fat Tony

Episode features
- Chalkboard gag: "I am not licensed to do anything"
- Couch gag: The couch is a giant Whac-A-Mole game.
- Commentary: Matt Groening; Josh Weinstein; Chuck Sheetz

Episode chronology
← Previous "The Springfield Files"	Next → "Mountain of Madness"
- The Simpsons season 8

"The Twisted World of Marge Simpson" is the eleventh episode of the eighth season of the American animated television series The Simpsons. It originally aired on the Fox network in the United States on January 19, 1997. It was written by Jennifer Crittenden and directed by Chuck Sheetz. The episode guest stars Jack Lemmon as Frank Ormand and Joe Mantegna as Fat Tony. In the episode, Marge buys a franchise in a pretzel business.

== Plot ==
The Springfield Investorettes – Maude Flanders, Helen Lovejoy, Agnes Skinner, Luann Van Houten and Edna Krabappel – expel Marge from their investment group because she is wary of high-risk ventures. The group returns Marge's $500 initial contribution, and Lisa persuades her to use the money to buy a business franchise. To compete with the Investorettes' Fleet-A-Pita enterprise, Marge buys a Pretzel Wagon franchise from owner Frank Ormand.

Marge parks her Pretzel Wagon outside the Springfield Nuclear Power Plant, and Homer persuades his coworkers to patronize it. The Investorettes' Fleet-A-Pita van parks nearby and lures away Marge's customers. To drum up business, the Pretzel Wagon sponsors a giveaway at the Springfield Isotopes baseball stadium. Before fans can consume their free pretzels, they learn that Mr. Burns has won a minivan and instead begin throwing the snacks at him and it. Retired pitcher Whitey Ford pleads for the crowd to calm down, but is knocked unconscious in the hail of pretzels. Marge becomes deeply depressed over her business struggles, so Homer searches for someone who can help her.

After discovering that both Frank and the executor of his estate have died in a car accident, Homer turns to Fat Tony and the Springfield Mafia for help in saving Marge's business. The criminals oblige him by coercing clients to place large orders and driving Marge's competitors out of business through intimidation and violence, eventually destroying the Investorettes' Fleet-A-Pita van with a car bomb. Fat Tony and his men confront Marge on the outskirts of town and reveal the agreement Homer made with them, then give her 12 hours to turn over all her profits. Homer admits to the deal, saying that he was only trying to help, and Marge decides not to pay.

Once time runs out, the Springfield Mafia arrives at the Simpsons' house and advances on Marge, only to be interrupted by the arrival of the Investorettes and their own criminal associates in the Japanese yakuza. A brutal fight breaks out between the rival gangs, and the Simpsons retreat into their house for safety. Marge forgives Homer for meddling and making the situation worse, and instructs the kids to go back to bed when they overhear the racket caused by the gangs.

== Production ==
The main plot of the episode concerning the two rival snack food franchises was selected because at the time of production, pita bread and pretzels were "becoming popular". Josh Weinstein expressed his wish that the ideas had been changed to something more "fun", as both snacks have since "gone out of fashion". The Fleet-A-Pita chef was an early version of the "Khlav-Kalash" man from "The City of New York vs. Homer Simpson". At the Expo, many of the franchises were based on real franchises and get-rich-quick schemes. In the scene where Homer is inspecting pretzels, there was originally a shot where he gave a thumbs down to Maggie's pretzel.

The episode was written by Jennifer Crittenden, who also wrote four other episodes. Homer's line "Yeah, Homer's right" during the scene where the pretzel wagon arrives was ad-libbed by Dan Castellaneta. In another scene, Cletus calls for his many children to come out of the house; the names of which were all "trendy names from the nineties". The 1997 Pontiac Astrowagon that Mr. Burns wins was designed to accurately resemble the GM minivans on sale at the time. The episode's final scene, the mob war, was conceived by Matt Groening as no-one else could come up with an ending.

== Cultural references ==
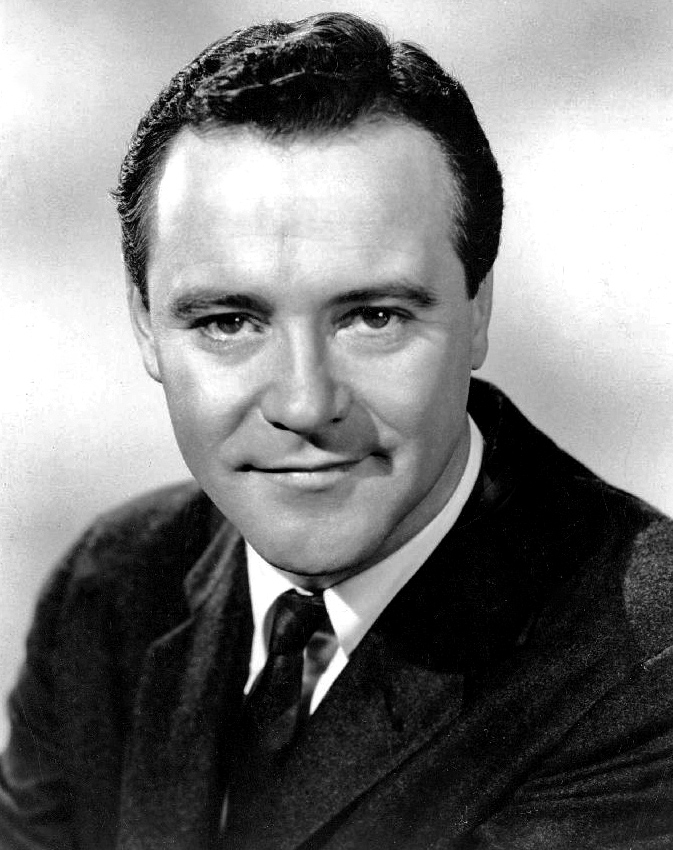
Guest star Jack Lemmon's portrayal of Frank Ormand was based on his role in Glengarry Glen Ross.

Frank Ormand's "You'll be there" speech mirrors that of Tom Joad from John Steinbeck's The Grapes of Wrath. Lemmon's portrayal of Ormand is based on the character Shelley Levene from the film Glengarry Glen Ross, also played by Lemmon. The character Gil Gunderson, who would not be introduced until the ninth season episode "Realty Bites", was also based on Levene. The scene in which the Springfield Mafia destroy all the competition to "Pretzel Wagon" is based on a scene from Goodfellas. The music played in the mob montage is "The Lineman". The Fleet-A-Pita's theme song is Fleetwood Mac's "Don't Stop". Rumer and Scout, two of Cletus's children, are named after Bruce Willis and Demi Moore's children. The scene where baseball fans cause a riot by throwing pretzels after Mr. Burns wins a new car, is based on an incident where the Los Angeles Dodgers were forced to forfeit. It happened on August 10, 1995, when the fans threw promotional baseballs onto the field to protest a bad call during the 9th inning.

== Reception ==
In its original broadcast, "The Twisted World of Marge Simpson" finished 55th in ratings for the week of January 13–19, 1997, with a Nielsen rating of 8.2, equivalent to approximately 8.0 million viewing households. It was the fifth-highest-rated show on the Fox network that week, following The X-Files, King of the Hill, Melrose Place, and Beverly Hills, 90210.

The authors of the book I Can't Believe It's a Bigger and Better Updated Unofficial Simpsons Guide, Gary Russell and Gareth Roberts, called it "A clever, and rather unusual, idea for an episode that shows a frightening bitchiness beneath the middle-class veneer of smalltown businesswomen." The scene with Cletus's children is one of two scenes from this episode that Josh Weinstein considers to be "classic", with the second being the sequence when the crowd throw their free pretzels onto the baseball field, knocking Whitey Ford unconscious. The Ford scene was placed 24th on ESPN.com's list of the "Top 100 Simpsons sport moments", released in 2004. Greg Collins, the author of the list, added that "Every time it looks like a fight is about to start at a baseball game, I start quoting this scene." The A.V. Club named the baseball commentator's line "Aaaannnd heeerrre come the pretzels" one of the quotes from The Simpsons that can be used in everyday situations. Erik Adams writes "Things go to Crazy Town, but Marge is recognizably Marge, gung ho when she finds a new calling, but that calling is like Frank and his sack of flour: She’s not surprised to find it’s riddled with millipedes. The 'Twisted World Of Marge Simpson' script would be Crittenden’s last for the show, but it leaves an impression. It contains some mixed messages about the nature of failure, while demonstrating that failure isn’t inevitable. If you aim high, sometimes people will care if you succeed. (Sometimes those people are in charge of Seinfeld and Everybody Loves Raymond, the next two series to hire Jennifer Crittenden.) 'The Twisted World Of Marge Simpson' keeps on spinning, piling up the pathos and the jokes like so many pretzels stacked atop the unconscious body of hall of famer Whitey Ford."
