= Sideshow Bob's Last Gleaming =

- The Simpsons episode
- Episode no.: Season 7 Episode 9
- Directed by: Dominic Polcino
- Written by: Spike Feresten
- Production code: 3F08
- Original air date: November 26, 1995

Guest appearances
- Kelsey Grammer as Sideshow Bob; R. Lee Ermey as Colonel Leslie Hapablap

Episode features
- Chalkboard gag: "Wedgies are unhealthy for children and other living things"
- Couch gag: The Simpsons are a family of Sea-Monkeys and swim to a couch made of clam shells to stare at an open treasure chest.
- Commentary: Bill Oakley; Josh Weinstein; Dominic Polcino

Episode chronology
← Previous "Mother Simpson"	Next → "The Simpsons 138th Episode Spectacular"
- The Simpsons season 7

"Sideshow Bob's Last Gleaming" is the ninth episode of the seventh season of the American animated television series The Simpsons. It originally aired on Fox in the United States on November 26, 1995. In this episode, Sideshow Bob returns in his 5th appearance of the series. Its title is a reference to “Twilight’s Last Gleaming”.

The episode was written by freelance writer Spike Feresten, and features the fifth major appearance of Sideshow Bob. Although Feresten received credit for the episode, the writing staff completely rewrote the episode and very little of Feresten's original script was left in the finished version. It was the first episode of The Simpsons to be directed by Dominic Polcino, who described it as being very difficult to direct. R. Lee Ermey, known for his role in Full Metal Jacket, guest stars as Col. Leslie "Hap" Hapablap while Kelsey Grammer reprises his role as Sideshow Bob.

The episode is a parody of "'60s-era nuclear war movies" and contains several references to Cold War films, including Twilight's Last Gleaming, Dr. Strangelove, and Fail-Safe. In its original broadcast, the episode finished 49th in ratings for the week of November 20–26, 1995, with a Nielsen rating of 8.7 and a 13 share of the audience.

The episode received generally positive reviews by critics.

== Plot ==
At Springfield Minimum Security Prison, Sideshow Bob is disturbed when he hears the other inmates laughing at the inane antics of Krusty the Clown's television show. Believing that television is a fountain of "mindless drivel" and wanting to rid the world of it, Bob escapes while on work duty at a local Air Force Base. By mimicking one of the base's colonels he gains access to a restricted area of the hangar, where he steals a 10-megaton nuclear weapon.

As the Simpsons and other residents of Springfield are attending an air show held at the base, the signal on the big screen is interrupted by Bob, who threatens to detonate the bomb unless Springfield disables all of its television broadcasts. Upon hearing the announcement, everyone flees the airfield in panic, except for Bart and Lisa. Unable to locate Bob, Mayor Quimby decides to give in to Bob's ultimatum. Krusty, refusing to submit to Bob's demands, takes refuge in a civil defense shack in the desert, which he uses to transmit a heavily improvised show.

Lisa deduces that the unusually high-pitched voice of Bob in his broadcast was due to inhaling helium, and locates him in the envelope of the Duff blimp. Bob, having lost his patience thanks to Krusty, tries to detonate the bomb, which turns out to be a dud, because it had passed the expiration date of November 1959. Lisa alerts the police to Bob's location using the blimp's variable-message sign, but Bob deflates the blimp and kidnaps Bart, before stealing the original Wright Brothers aircraft, which had been an exhibit at the air show. Holding a knife against Bart's throat, Bob attempts to carry out a deadly kamikaze attack against the civil defense shack where Krusty is hiding and kill him, Bart, and himself, but the slow-moving plane ends up merely bouncing harmlessly off the shack. The authorities quickly arrest Bob and take him back into custody while Bart is reunited with the rest of the family.

== Production ==
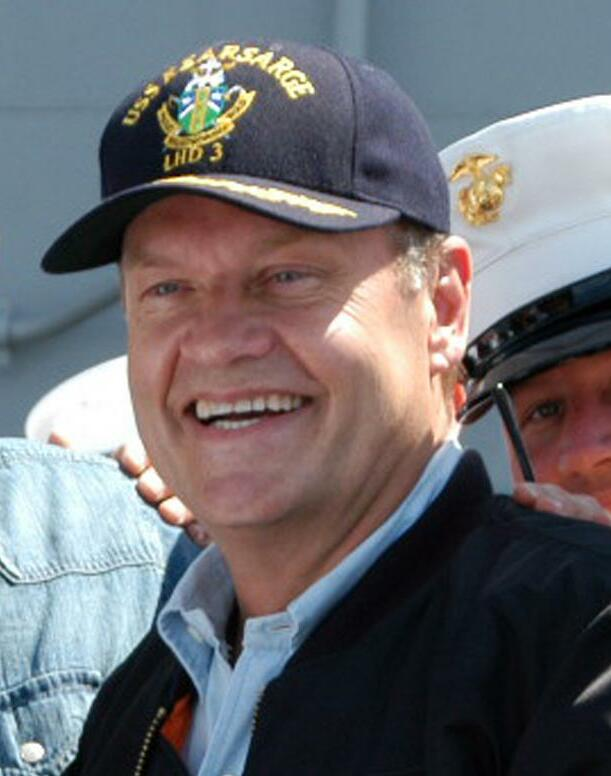
Kelsey Grammer guest starred as Sideshow Bob for the fifth time.

"Sideshow Bob's Last Gleaming" was the fifth episode of The Simpsons to feature Sideshow Bob as the main character, after "Krusty Gets Busted", "Black Widower", "Cape Feare", and "Sideshow Bob Roberts". Executive producers Bill Oakley and Josh Weinstein believed that every season of the show should contain an episode featuring Bob. However, Bob had already been in four episodes and the writers were having a difficult time coming up with new ways to include him. The first draft of the episode was written by Spike Feresten, a freelance writer who later became known for his work on Seinfeld. Although he received credit for the episode, the writing staff completely rewrote the episode and very little of Feresten's original script was left in the episode. Oakley describes the episode as "one of the most arduous rewrites in the history of the show" because much of the dialogue had to be re-written.

"Sideshow Bob's Last Gleaming" was the first episode of The Simpsons to be directed by Dominic Polcino, who had worked as an assistant director on the show and had left the show, but was offered a chance to be a director. He describes the episode as a "tough one to start with", especially the scenes with the Wright Flyer. An early version of the script featured a longer scene at the air show that featured Hans Moleman flying an early flying machine. The scene where Milhouse is in a jet pretending to fire missiles at his parents because he's upset with them, would later inspire the episode "A Milhouse Divided". In that episode, Milhouse's parents become divorced, and it is also a reference to Dr. Frasier Crane.

A character modeled after Fox Network owner Rupert Murdoch briefly appears in a scene set in jail. The censors said that Murdoch could not be shown, but Murdoch gave his permission for his caricature to be used. Murdoch was voiced in that scene by series regular Dan Castellaneta. R. Lee Ermey, known for his role in Full Metal Jacket, guest stars as Col. Leslie "Hap" Hapablap. The role was specifically written for him and much of his dialogue was difficult to write. The line "What is your major malfunction?" is based on dialogue from Full Metal Jacket.

== Cultural references ==
The underground compound in the episode references the war room from Dr. Strangelove.

The episode is a parody of "'60s-era nuclear war movies" and contains several references to Cold War films. There were also several references to Dr. Strangelove: the underground compound resembles the war room from the film; Professor Frink was redesigned to parody the title character; the tune that Sideshow Bob whistles while preparing the bomb is "We'll Meet Again", as sung by Vera Lynn at the end of the film; and Krusty's acting whilst he defends television is based on George C. Scott's performance as General Buck Turgidson. An alien appears in Hangar 18, a reference to the film of the same name, and indirectly the Roswell incident.

Another parodied film is the 1964 thriller Fail-Safe by Sidney Lumet: at the beginning of the third act of the episode, scenes of everyday life across Springfield are shown, and one by one, with a 'zooming' sound effect, they all freeze-frame in anticipation of the (supposedly) imminent nuclear blast; such was the ending of Fail-Safe. One of the scenes before the supposed nuclear blast shows Maggie picking flowers in a field, with the camera zooming into her eye, and then the minuscule blast occurs. This is a parody of the innovative and controversial Daisy advertisement used by Lyndon B. Johnson in the 1964 United States presidential election.

The dud bomb is partially a reference to the film The Mouse That Roared, which also features a nonfunctional nuclear bomb with mice inside. In the episode the bomb is revealed to be a dud after it falls apart and mice run out from it; in the movie, after the mouse leaves the bomb starts working again. Sideshow Bob's bomb also has a note that says "Best before 1959," the year The Mouse That Roared was made.

Tom Baker's Fourth Doctor from Doctor Who makes an appearance. Bob is horrified at hearing Vanessa Redgrave playing a foul-mouthed grandmother on an American sitcom. Her line, "Now I’m going to haul ass to Lollapalooza!", is reprised by Grandpa at the end of the episode.

== Reception ==
In its original broadcast, "Sideshow Bob's Last Gleaming" finished 49th in ratings for the week of November 20–26, 1995, with a Nielsen rating of 8.7 and a 13 share of the audience. It was the fourth highest-rated show on the Fox network that week behind The X-Files, Beverly Hills, 90210, and Melrose Place.

The authors of the book I Can't Believe It's a Bigger and Better Updated Unofficial Simpsons Guide, Gary Russell and Gareth Roberts, wrote, "Probably the least satisfying of Sideshow Bob's gleamings – but there's enough slapstick and satire to keep things ticking along nicely."

DVD Movie Guide's Colin Jacobson wrote, "Though it doesn't compete with the best Bob shows, it has more than a few nice moments." He added that he enjoyed R. Lee Ermey's guest appearance as well as the jokes about the Fox network. Jennifer Malkowski of DVD Verdict considered the best part of the episode to be when Milhouse was playing in the fighter jet at the air show. Malkowski concluded her review by giving the episode a grade of B−. Dennis Perkins writes "Bob’s a lonely, cultured (if pretentious) soul in a world that venerates the likes of Krusty and, watching our own world’s Krusty simulacra, haven’t we all longed to feel our finger linger over the big red television kill switch?" He praises Grammer's performance, particularly the line “By the way, I’m aware of the irony of appearing on television in order to decry it. So don’t bother pointing that out.”
