= Steve Tompkins =

American television writer

Steve Tompkins is an American television writer. He attended Harvard University and wrote for the Harvard Lampoon; he graduated in 1988. He has worked on such television shows such as The Critic, In Living Color, Entourage, The Bernie Mac Show and The Knights of Prosperity. He was also with The Simpsons, for its seventh and eighth seasons; after leaving he co-created The PJs, with Larry Wilmore and Eddie Murphy. He was also the executive producer on the Nickelodeon animated series Fanboy & Chum Chum (with Fred Seibert) and also voiced the character Janitor Poopatine.

== Writing credits ==
=== The Simpsons episodes ===
He worked on the following episodes:

- "Treehouse of Horror VI" ("Nightmare on Evergreen Terrace")
- "22 Short Films About Springfield" (contributor)
- "The Simpsons Spin-Off Showcase" ("Simpsons Family Smile-Time Variety Hour" segment)
- "A Milhouse Divided" (the only full episode of The Simpsons Tompkins has written)

Josh Weinstein and Bill Oakley said that, with the exception of George Meyer, Tompkins had contributed more to seasons seven and eight than anyone else on the Simpsons staff. Tompkins wrote the sequence in "Homer's Phobia" where Homer takes Bart to a steel mill that turns out to be a gay dance club. He first pitched that Homer and Bart would encounter longshoremen, but it was too much work to animate the lading of ships, so a steel mill was used instead. Tompkins also wrote a different third act for the episode which was replaced in the final cut. Instead of Homer, Bart, Barney and Moe going deer hunting and ending up at "Santa's Village" they would go back to the steel mill. There, Homer would attempt to prove his heterosexuality by having a human tractor pulling contest with some of the steel mill workers. It was decided that it "didn't really service the story" and was dropped.
