= Dominic Polcino =

Animation director

- Occupation: Animation director

Dominic Polcino is an animation director who has worked on The Simpsons, Mission Hill, King of the Hill, and Family Guy. Polcino worked on the first season of Family Guy, then left to direct for King of the Hill and then returned to Family Guy. Polcino is currently a director on the Adult Swim series Rick and Morty. He then went on to create the TV pilot Lovesick Fool which debuted on FunnyOrDie then went on to exhibit at Film Festivals and is currently on YouTube. His brother, Michael Polcino, is presently a director on The Simpsons.

Dominic was also the Supervising Director on the Dan Harmon series, HarmonQuest, which is a hybrid live action series that animates the tabletop RPG exploits of Dan Harmon and his celebrity friends.

== Directing credits ==
=== The Simpsons episodes ===
He is credited with directing the following episodes:

- "Sideshow Bob's Last Gleaming" (1995)
- "Bart After Dark" (1996)
- "The Canine Mutiny" (1997)
- "Lisa's Sax" (1997)
- "Bart Star" (1997)
- "Dumbbell Indemnity" (1998)
- "Lard of the Dance" (1998)

=== King of the Hill episodes ===
He is credited with directing the following episodes:

- "Pretty, Pretty Dresses" (1998)
- "Bill of Sales" (2000)
- "Peggy Makes the Big Leagues" (2000)
- "Now Who's the Dummy?" (2001)
- "Joust Like a Woman" (2002)
- "Beer and Loathing" (2002)
- "The Son Also Roses" (2002)
- "Pigmalion" (2003)
- "Vision Quest" (2003)
- "Reborn to be Wild" (2003)
- "After the Mold Rush" (2003)
- "DaleTech" (2004)
- "Enrique-cilable Differences" (2005)
- "Mutual of Omabwah" (2005)
- "Bystand Me" (2005)
- "Hank Fixes Everything" (with Ronald Rubio) (2006)

=== Family Guy episodes ===
He is credited with directing the following episodes:

- "Chitty Chitty Death Bang" (1999)
- "You May Now Kiss the...Uh...Guy Who Receives" (2006)
- "Bill and Peter's Bogus Journey" (2007)
- "Blue Harvest" (2007)
- "Long John Peter" (2008)
- "Something, Something, Something, Dark Side" (2009)
- "And Then There Were Fewer" (2010)
- "The Big Bang Theory" (2011)

=== Rick and Morty episodes ===
He is credited with directing the following episodes:

- "Mortynight Run" (2015)
- "The Ricks Must Be Crazy" (2015)
- "Look Who's Purging Now" (2015)
- "Rickmancing the Stone" (2017)
- "The Ricklantis Mixup" (2017)
