= Karl Wiedergott =

American actor (born 1969)

- Born: Karl Aloysious Treaton; February 8, 1969 (age 57); West Berlin, West Germany
- Occupation: Actor
- Years active: 1985–2010

Karl Wiedergott (born Karl Aloysious Treaton; February 8, 1969) is an American retired actor. He is noted for his voice work on the sitcom The Simpsons from 1998 to 2010, voicing background characters and some celebrities such as John Travolta and Bill Clinton. Wiedergott provided various voices on more than 200 episodes, his final appearance being in the season 22 episode "Donnie Fatso".

In 2005, Wiedergott decided to take a break from auditioning and concentrate solely on his work for The Simpsons. After the episode "Donnie Fatso", he not only quit the series, but he also retired from acting in general.

== Filmography ==
=== Film ===
Year	Title	Role	Notes
1986	The Education of Allison Tate	Scott Carroll	
1988	18 Again!	Team Member	
1988	The Wrong Guys	Pancake House Waiter	
1990	Monday Morning	Bill Cobbs	
1997	Time Under Fire	Dr. Zimmer	
1997	The Truth About Juliet	Chaloots	
1999	Breakfast of Champions	Homer	
2001	The Confidence Man	The Student	
2001	The Socratic Method	Dennis	
2003	Two Days	Charlie	Also writer
2003	Wonderful Days	Moe / Digger Foreman (voices)	
2007	The Simpsons Movie	Man / EPA Driver (voices)	

=== Television ===
Year	Title	Role	Notes
1985–1988	The Golden Girls	Kenny / Boy #1	2 episodes
1986	ABC Afterschool Special	Gordy	Episode: "Can a Guy Say No?"
1988	CBS Summer Playhouse	Kurt Hersh	Episode: "Limited Partners"
1989	Coach	Male Student	Episode: "Kelly and the Professor"
1989	I Know My First Name Is Steven	Punk #3	2 episodes
1990	21 Jump Street	Hank	Episode: "Shirts and Skins"
1990	Columbo	Ollie Sachs	Episode: "Columbo Goes to College"
1993	Wings	Dominick	Episode: "Black Eye Affair"
1994	Burke's Law	Rick	Episode: "Who Killed the Anchorman?"
1995	Attack of the 5 Ft. 2 Women	Dirk Smith	Television film
1995	The Marshal	Ray Carey	Episode: "Twoslip"
1996	Star Trek: Voyager	Ameron	Episode: "Warlord"
1998	Beyond Belief: Fact or Fiction	Ted Beeman	2 episodes
1998–2010	The Simpsons	Various voices	253 episodes
1999	Brimstone	Hazmat Team Doctor	Episode: "Carrier"
1999	Starship Regulars	Jackson / Blinka	3 episodes
1999	Pirates of Silicon Valley	Mac Designer	Television film
2000	ER	Dr. Krepp	Episode: "Under Control"
2001	Judging Amy	Aaron	Episode: "Grounded"
2002	Star Trek: Enterprise	Larr	Episode: "Dear Doctor"
2002	Roswell	Scientist	Episode: "Panacea"
2002	NYPD Blue	Lance Edmunds	Episode: "Safari, So Good"
2003	The Pitts	Starter	Episode: "Squarewolves"
2004	Crossing Jordan	Aaron Furney	Episode: "Missing Pieces"
