= The Real Housewives of Fat Tony =

- The Simpsons episode
- Episode no.: Season 22; Episode 19
- Directed by: Lance Kramer
- Written by: Dick Blasucci
- Production code: NABF12
- Original air date: May 1, 2011

Guest appearance
- Joe Mantegna as Fat Tony

Episode features
- Couch gag: The couch and the family are on the cover of a VHS video which is inside an abandoned rental store called "Million Dollar Video." The store (and everything inside it) gets demolished.

Episode chronology
← Previous "The Great Simpsina"	Next → "Homer Scissorhands"
- The Simpsons season 22

"The Real Housewives of Fat Tony" is the nineteenth episode of the twenty-second season of the American animated television series The Simpsons. It first aired on the Fox network in the United States on May 1, 2011. This episode mainly centers around Marge Simpson and one of her older sisters, Selma, who falls in love with mobster Fat Tony. Selma later begins the glamorous lifestyle associated with being in the Mafia and the couple agrees to marry each other. The marriage leads to tension between Marge and Selma. Fat Tony later invites Homer and Marge to his mansion in New Jersey, in hopes of mending the sisters' relationship. Meanwhile, Bart acquires an ability to trace the location of truffles, which leads Lisa to attest to her growing greed for eating truffles.

This episode was written by Dick Blasucci, and directed by Lance Kramer. The episode was met with a mixed to negative response from television critics, with much criticism going to the cultural references and the main storyline. It garnered a 2.9 rating in the 18-49 demographic. The episode featured a guest appearance from Joe Mantegna, as well as several recurring voice actors and actresses for the series.

== Plot ==
Selma is greeted by Fat Tony at the DMV. She makes several sarcastic remarks towards Fat Tony and refuses to let him submit a change of address. This prompts him to order his local mafia to abduct and kidnap her. They set her up for interrogation, in which she says more sarcastic remarks and, when asked which body part she wants cut off first, requests liposuction. Fat Tony falls in love with her humor and grants her request.

Fat Tony and Selma begin a romantic relationship. Fat Tony proposes to Selma, and they get married. During the wedding reception, tension rises between Marge and Selma after the couple places the Simpsons in an undesirable location, and Marge angrily admits to Selma that she was never sure about her marriage.

To apologize, Fat Tony later invites the Simpsons to his mansion on the shore. While on the beach, Selma reveals to Marge that she was envious that she was not in a happy marriage, and asks for Marge's support. Later, Marge and Homer overhear Fat Tony talking about a comare and conclude that he is cheating on her with another woman, so they tell Selma about this.

Selma confronts Fat Tony, just as another woman crashes into his yard, claiming to be his real wife. Fat Tony confesses to Selma that he proposed to her to be his comare and their wedding ceremony reflected such intents. Selma declares she is done trying to get married, just before being insulted by Fat Tony's wife. This triggers a fight between the ladies, while Homer sneaks off with Marge, admitting that she was right.

Meanwhile, Bart and Lisa are in the forest when Bart sniffs out a truffle. After she explains that truffles are prized gourmet foods, Bart finds another, and both realize he can find them by smell. After talking with Luigi about the truffles for Luigi's restaurant where he offers to pay them for any truffles found, Lisa uses Bart to find more truffles. Eventually, when they cannot any more, Lisa blinds Bart to keep him focused. He sniffs out a truffle in Lisa's bedroom. Instead of selling them as planned, Lisa has been eating them. They feel sorry for Luigi's pig who did not get to eat any, so give him the one that Lisa had. The pig goes berserk and tears through Luigi's restaurant to eat more of them.

== Production ==
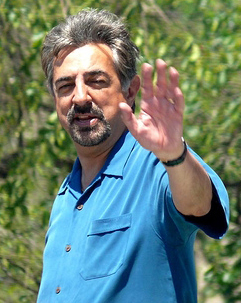
Joe Mantegna made a guest appearance on the show, reprising his role as Fat Tony.

"The Real Housewives of Fat Tony" first aired on May 1, 2011 in the United States. This episode was directed by Lance Kramer who last directed a Simpsons episode in the season twenty-one episode, "To Surveil with Love." It was written by Dick Blasucci, in his first episode of the series.

This episode featured a guest appearances from Joe Mantegna, as well as several recurring voice actors and actresses for the series. Mantegna reprised his role as Fat Tony, in his second appearance in the season as the first was in the episode "Donnie Fatso." Alongside her role as Marge, Julie Kavner provided the voices for Patty and Selma Bouvier.

== Reception ==
“The Real Housewives of Fat Tony” mainly focused on Selma’s marriage to Fat Tony [...]. This gave the show’s writers every opportunity to make a series of tired jokes about Italian-American stereotypes. I guess I should be thankful that they didn’t waste more time poking fun of the Jersey Shore’s cast or, worse still, that they didn’t invite the cast of that obnoxious show to play themselves. The show’s writers have gotten so lazy that I didn’t even bat an eye when they busted out a joke about how all the light fixtures in Fat Tony’s mansion had tanning bulbs installed in them."

— Simon Abrams of The A.V. Club, on "The Real Housewives of Fat Tony"

=== Viewing figures ===
The episode was first broadcast on May 1, 2011, and it was viewed by 6.109 million viewers upon its original airing. While this episode achieved a 2.9 rating in the 18-49 demographic, according to the Nielsen ratings. The episode's total viewership and ratings were significantly up from the previous episode, "The Great Simpsina," which was viewed by 4.996 million viewers upon its initial airing, and garnered a 2.3 rating in the 18-49 demographic.

=== Critical response ===
The episode was met with a mixed to negative response from television critics.

Ariel Ponywether of Firefox News was negative about the sub-plot. She felt that it was a decent episode, noting that it was "funny, but not that much." Ponywether ultimately gave the episode a 'B+' grade.

Eric Hochberger of TV Fanatic gave it a 2.5 out of 5 stars, as he gave much criticism to the main plot of the episode. He deemed it as a "mediocre version of Jersey Shore." Hochberger also expressed discontentment for the sub-plot of the episode, stating that it "didn't tie in at all with the main storyline." In his review for this episode, he harshly criticized the jokes featured in the episode. He opined: "While I'm usually a fan of the mob boss jokes that Fat Tony's appearances bring, they've pretty much been beaten to death by this show. Plus, this has been the second weak Fat Tony episode this season after the terrible "Donnie Fatso." Maybe it's time to retire this character from headlining episodes until the writers come up with a story worthy of telling."

Simon Abrams of The A.V. Club reacted negatively to the episode, giving it a 'C' grade. He criticized the writer's capabilities of writing as in his opinion, that they are not funny. However, Abrams was more positive on the subplot, saying that it was decent.
