= I Am Furious (Yellow) =

- The Simpsons episode
- Episode no.: Season 13; Episode 18
- Directed by: Chuck Sheetz
- Written by: John Swartzwelder
- Production code: DABF13
- Original air date: April 28, 2002

Guest appearances
- Stan Lee as himself; Marcia Wallace as Mrs. Krabappel

Episode features
- Couch gag: The Simpsons sit on the couch as normal, until a crane game clamp comes down and picks up Homer.
- Commentary: Matt Groening; Al Jean; Matt Selman; Don Payne; Tom Gammill; Max Pross; Mike Reiss; Stan Lee; Chuck Sheetz; David Silverman

Episode chronology
← Previous "Gump Roast"	Next → "The Sweetest Apu"
- The Simpsons season 13

"I Am Furious (Yellow)" is the eighteenth episode of the thirteenth season of the American animated television series The Simpsons. It first aired in the United States by the Fox network on April 28, 2002. In this episode, Bart creates a comic book series based on his father Homer's anger problems, which turns into a popular Internet cartoon series called Angry Dad. Homer finds out and at first is outraged, but after talking to his family, decides to try to become a less angry person.

This episode was directed by Chuck Sheetz and written by John Swartzwelder. The idea was pitched by Matt Selman, and the staff took inspiration from their own experience with web cartoons, such as Queer Duck and Hard Drinkin' Lincoln. The episode includes references to the dot-com bubble, Danish physicist Niels Bohr and comic book publishers Marvel Comics and DC Comics. American comic book writer Stan Lee made a guest appearance as himself.

Before its original broadcast, "I Am Furious (Yellow)" faced scrutiny from fans as an example of the series jumping the shark, as they had interpreted pre-release materials as suggesting that Homer would literally transform into the Hulk in the episode. In the original broadcast, the episode was seen by approximately 7.8 million viewers, finishing in 26th place in the ratings for the week. Following its home video release, "I Am Furious (Yellow)" received positive reviews from critics, and is often considered a favorite among fans. A sequel to this episode, "Angry Dad: The Movie", in which Bart and Homer make a short film based on Angry Dad, aired in the United States on February 20, 2011.

== Plot ==
Kirk Van Houten gives a speech to the kids at Springfield Elementary about his occupation of assistant flyer distributor. Owing to the short and unengaging nature of his speech, Principal Skinner and Mrs. Krabappel take Lisa's advice and visit the Springfield Writer's Forum to find a better speaker, where they meet Jeff Jenkins, creator of the popular TV cartoon Danger Dog. Jenkins comes to the school to give a presentation on Danger Dog, and fascinates the kids by telling them about the cartoon industry. Inspired by Jenkins, Bart creates the comic Danger Dude and tries to sell it to Comic Book Guy at The Android's Dungeon, but is turned down. Stan Lee enters the store and tells Bart that although his comic is bad, he should keep trying to "find his own voice."

At home, Bart comes up with a character called Angry Dad, a caricature of his father Homer and his frequent angry outbursts. The first issue of Angry Dad becomes a hit with the kids in school, although Lisa finds it insulting to their father's activities; Comic Book Guy begins selling the comic at The Android's Dungeon. Later, Bart is approached by a spokesman for an Internet entertainment site who wants to make Angry Dad into an online animated cartoon series, and he agrees in exchange for stock. The cartoon becomes a viral hit, but Homer remains unaware of Angry Dad until he finds out one day at work. Humiliated, Homer returns home and strangles Bart. Marge and Lisa stop Homer and calm him down, pointing out he has anger management issues. He agrees to work on his issues by suppressing his anger from that point and to be a calmer person, disregarding Marge's attempts to convince him to go on a diet.

The next day, Homer stays true to his word and remains calm, though his attempts to repress his rage causes lumps to develop on his neck. However, his new calm demeanor has taken away Bart's inspiration for his cartoon, so Bart and Milhouse set up a trap for Homer to trigger another outburst. Later, they go to the Internet company office, where they find the company has gone bankrupt (Internet Bubble Burst). Realizing their mistake, they race back home to stop Homer from falling into the trap. Homer reaches home and happens upon Bart's trap, but he keeps his calm throughout its run, resulting in more lumps on his neck. The trap ends with Homer falling into a pool full of green paint just as Bart and Milhouse arrive, prompting him to go berserk and storm through town à la the Hulk.

Homer is restrained by the police and then admitted to the hospital, where Marge reprimands Bart for provoking Homer and causing $10 million of damages to the city, but Dr. Hibbert arrives and states that Bart unknowingly saved Homer's life by enraging him. He explains the lumps on Homer's neck were actually boils caused by suppressed rage and would have otherwise killed Homer by overwhelming his nervous system if Bart's prank had not set him off with the right outburst he needed. Homer thanks Bart by taking him fishing, despite the latter annoying his father.

== Production ==
"I Am Furious (Yellow)" was written by John Swartzwelder and directed by Chuck Sheetz. First broadcast by Fox in the United States on April 28, 2002. The episode's storyline was pitched by Simpsons writer Matt Selman. In the DVD audio commentary for the episode, he stated that Matt Groening, the creator of the series, would usually tell the writers about how he was the class clown and did not pay attention in school, and yet grew up to become very successful. After hearing this, Selman thought that if Groening went back to his school to talk about his career, it "[would be] the last message that a principal and the teachers would wanna hear." Selman pitched the story because he thought it would be "humorously infuriating" to teachers. The episode was also partly based on some of the Simpsons staff members' experience with making internet cartoons, such as Queer Duck and Hard Drinkin' Lincoln, both of which were created by Mike Reiss.

The experience knocked me out. However, nothing is perfect. The drawing of me didn't look quite as much like Brad Pitt as I had expected.

— Stan Lee

The Angry Dad internet cartoon, as well as the other internet cartoons in the episode, were originally going to be animated using Macromedia Flash, however, the department of Film Roman that handled Flash animation would not be able to complete the scenes in time. Because of this, director Sheetz had to draw the scenes himself, mimicking the look of Flash animation. At the end of Bart's trap, Homer falls into a pool of green paint, making him resemble the Hulk. Bart also remarked that Homer's pants stayed on, referencing to how the Hulk's pants never rip off when increasing to muscle mass. Selman originally wanted Homer to fall into blue paint, since the blue paint mixed with his yellow skin would make green, however the idea never came to fruition.

The episode features comic book writer Stan Lee as himself. In John Ortved's book The Simpsons: An Uncensored, Unauthorized History, Lee stated that he attended the episode's table read, and was impressed with the size and quality of the creative staff, who all sat around the conference table. Lee recalled in 2009, "Honestly, there was so much genuine talent around that table that you could have cut it with a knife." Afterward, Lee met the writers of the show, and was pleasantly surprised to find that they were familiar with his work and he was with theirs. Afterward, executive producer Al Jean took Lee out to lunch, who he called "one of the nicest and most unassuming guys you could hope to meet." Lee continued, "Of course, I probably said something wrong to him, or he didn't like my table manners, because I haven't been invited back for another guest shot. But hey one lives in hope." Lee would later guest star again as himself in "Married to the Blob" and "The Caper Chase". In a meta-joke, the character of the voice actor who plays Angry Dad is voiced by Dan Castellaneta, who also provides Homer's voice; the character's design is also a caricature of Castellaneta.

== Cultural references ==
The title of the episode is a parody of 1967 Swedish art house film I Am Curious (Yellow). The episode references the dot-com bubble, a speculative bubble covering roughly 1995–2000. In their article "15 Simpsons Moments That Perfectly Captured Their Eras", Genevieve Koski, Josh Modell, Noel Murray, Sean O'Neal, Kyle Ryan and Scott Tobias of The A.V. Club wrote: "By April 2002, the dot-com bubble of the late '90s had been popped for a couple of years, taking with it myriad Internet start-ups. A sobering soul-searching settled in their place, which The Simpsons captured in this episode about Bart creating a popular Internet cartoon called Angry Dad. Touring the laid-back start-up that hosts the cartoons, Lisa asks head honcho Todd Linux about their business model. 'How many shares of stock will it take to end this conversation?' he retorts. Lisa asks for two million, which Linux grabs from a paper-towel dispenser. When Bart and Lisa return later, the company has gone bust, and Linux is stealing copper wire out of the walls."

When Stan Lee approaches Database, who is playing with a toy Batmobile, he asks him if he would rather prefer a more exciting action figure. Lee then begins shoving a The Thing action figure into the Batmobile, effectively destroying it. This scene pokes fun at the DC vs. Marvel rivalry (Batman's Batmobile of DC Comics and The Thing a property of Marvel Comics). Another scene in the episode references Danish physicist Niels Bohr. In his book What's Science Ever Done For Us: What the Simpsons Can Teach Us About Physics, Robots, Life, and the Universe, Paul Halpern wrote "In the episode [...], one of Homer's favorite TV shows is preempted by the program The Boring World of Niels Bohr. Homer is so upset that he clutches an ice-cream sandwich, and aims at the screen like it's a remote control, squeezes the contents out, and splatters Bohr's image. In contrast to Homer's reaction, most physicists heap nothing but accolades upon Bohr, whose revolutionary ideas shaped the modern concept of the atom."

== Release and reception ==
=== Broadcast and re-release ===
In its original American broadcast on April 28, 2002, "I Am Furious (Yellow)" received a 7.4 rating, according to Nielsen Media Research, translating to approximately 7.8 million viewers. The episode finished 26th in the ratings for the week of April 22–28, 2002, making it the Fox network's most watched program that night. Combined with a new episode of Malcolm in the Middle, The Simpsons beat CBS's Everybody Loves Raymond special ("Everybody Loves Raymond: The First Six Years") in the ratings, besting the special by a full rating point and a half among adults between ages 18 to 49. On August 24, 2010, the episode was released as part of The Simpsons: The Complete Thirteenth Season DVD and Blu-ray box set. Matt Groening, Al Jean, Matt Selman, Mike Reiss, Chuck Sheetz, Don Payne, Tom Gammill, Max Pross, David Silverman, and Stan Lee participated in the DVD audio commentary for the episode.

=== Critical reception ===
Upon the episode's release, a promotional image of Homer mimicking the Hulk caused some of the series' internet fans to speculate that the show had jumped the shark. "[...] I still remember the publicity it [the episode] got," Jean said in the DVD commentary for the episode. "The internet people were like, 'They jumped the shark. They're having Homer turn into The Hulk.' [...] We clearly did it in a logical fashion. He's not really super strong."

Following its broadcast, "I Am Furious (Yellow)" garnered positive reviews from critics, and is often considered a fan favorite.

Colin Jacobsson of DVD Movie Guide called the episode one of the better installments from Season 13, referring to it as "very good" and saying that "the series has milked Homer's rage [as one of its chief sources of humor] for years, but does so in creative and satisfying ways here."

R.L. Shaffer of IGN described "I Am Furious (Yellow)", along with "Brawl in the Family" and "Half-Decent Proposal", as being "cleverly written" and the best episodes of the season.

Aaron Peck of High-Def Digest stated that the episode is one of his "personal favorites," and Ron Martin of 411Mania called it a "standout episode."

Adam Rayner of Obsessed With Film gave the episode a favorable review as well. He wrote that, even though it is not "as rooted in reality as the great episodes," the episode is "consistently hilarious." He concluded that the episode is "great comedy from start to finish."

Blu-ray.com's Casey Broadwater called the episode a "strong character-centric episode," and added that the title is one of his "favorites."

Writing for Project-Blu, Nate Boss wrote "Just when you think The Simpsons is broke, we get Angry Dad. To quote Stan Lee: 'Broke? Or made it BETTER?' That's right. Stan 'the man' Lee."

Jennifer Malkowski of DVD Verdict gave the episode a B+, describing "Homer's random exclamation while running around on fire, 'Oh, I hope no one's drawing this!'" as the episode's "highlight."

Ryan Keefer of DVD Talk described the episode as being "flat out funny." Lee's appearance in the episode was also praised. Rayner called his performance "one of the all time great cameos," and Jacobson called it "fun." Broadwater considered Lee's appearance to be one of the season's "highlights," and Total Film's Nathan Ditum ranked Lee's performance as the 12th best guest appearance in the show's history, describing his character as "a deranged, childish and brilliant version of himself."

=== Legacy ===
The episode has been used as an indicator to the growth of internet companies. In his article "Best Indicator Ever: The Simpsons Foreclosure", Jonathan Hoenig of SmartMoney wrote that the twentieth season episode "No Loan Again, Naturally", an episode in which the Simpsons are foreclosed from their house, could have indicated that "the worst of the housing crisis" at the time the article was written, was over. Hoenig based this theory on the fact that shortly after "I Am Furious (Yellow)", which satirizes the dot-com bubble, aired, the dotcom stocks "began a massive rebound from bear-market lows."

"I Am Furious (Yellow)" inspired the idea for the twenty-second season episode "Angry Dad: The Movie", which originally aired on February 20, 2011, in the United States. In "Angry Dad: The Movie", Bart and Homer create a short film based on the Angry Dad cartoon seen in "I Am Furious (Yellow)", but after the film wins a myriad of prizes, the two start fighting over who created the series.

== See also ==
- Dot-com bubble
- DC Comics
- Marvel Comics
- "Angry Dad: The Movie"
