= Donnie Fatso =

- The Simpsons episode
- Promotional image for the episode
- Episode no.: Season 22; Episode 9
- Directed by: Ralph Sosa
- Written by: Chris Cluess
- Production code: MABF19
- Original air date: December 12, 2010

Guest appearances
- Jon Hamm as the FBI Agent; Joe Mantegna as Fat Tony and Fit Tony

Episode features
- Chalkboard gag: "Candy canes are not elf bones"
- Couch gag: The Simpsons on the couch is depicted as an Advent Calendar.

Episode chronology
← Previous "The Fight Before Christmas"	Next → "Moms I'd Like to Forget"
- The Simpsons season 22

"Donnie Fatso" is the ninth episode in the twenty-second season of the American animated television series The Simpsons. It was written by Chris Cluess and directed by Ralph Sosa. "Donnie Fatso" revolves around an FBI agent (Jon Hamm), who helps Homer Simpson (Dan Castellaneta) go undercover to infiltrate Fat Tony (Joe Mantegna)'s mob. Homer agrees to help the FBI in order to reduce his prison sentence on a bribery conviction. The plot and title of episode features references to the 1990s gangster films Goodfellas and Donnie Brasco.

"Donnie Fatso" first aired on FOX in the United States on December 12, 2010. Upon its initial airing, the episode received 7.32 million viewers and with a 3.2/8 rating share in the 18-49 demographic. For their work on the episode, Castellaneta and Cluess were nominated at the 63rd Primetime Emmy Awards and the 64th Writers Guild of America Awards respectively. The death of Fat Tony was met with mixed reaction from critics who found it effective while unnecessary.

== Plot ==
Homer and Marge wake on New Year's Day with hangovers after the family's New Year's Eve celebration. As Homer takes out the garbage, Chief Wiggum, Eddie, and Lou arrive and issue him multiple citations and fines - the result of recently passed, frivolous laws intended to bring in revenue for the city when broken. Taking Moe's suggestion that he bribe a city official to clear up the fines, Homer leaves a sack full of cash on the official's desk but is promptly arrested, convicted, and sentenced to 10 years in prison. Wiggum takes pity on Homer and tells him to meet with an FBI agent, who offers to reduce the sentence if Homer will go undercover in the prison as Nicholas "Nicky" Bluepants Altosaxophony to investigate Fat Tony, who is also serving time along as his top henchmen.

Homer quickly gains favor with Fat Tony, due to a confrontation engineered by the FBI agent, and Fat Tony breaks him and the entire group out of prison and offers him a chance to join the syndicate. Homer's first task is to burn down Moe's Tavern in revenge for Moe's rudeness toward Fat Tony on the phone, but Homer finds that Moe has already done the deed himself. Fat Tony accepts Homer into the syndicate and the two develop a special bond; however, complications over a scheme to import weapons put the syndicate under severe stress. Eventually Fat Tony discovers Homer's undercover status and, emotionally devastated by his betrayal, dies of a fatal heart attack.

Meanwhile, Marge has begun to panic over being unable to communicate with Homer, as she knows nothing of his undercover work and cannot get any information on his whereabouts. She is surprised and thrilled when he returns home with his prison sentence lifted, but Homer feels guilt for Fat Tony's death and bitterness toward the government over being used to bring him down. Homer visits Fat Tony's grave to apologize, but is kidnapped by his cousin Fit Tony, who plans to kill him for revenge. However, Fit Tony spares his life after Homer tells of the time he and Fat Tony spent together, seeing that Fat Tony lives on in Homer's memories. Fit Tony takes charge of the syndicate, but the stress of the position causes him to overeat and gain weight, eventually becoming indistinguishable from Fat Tony and assuming his name.

== Production ==
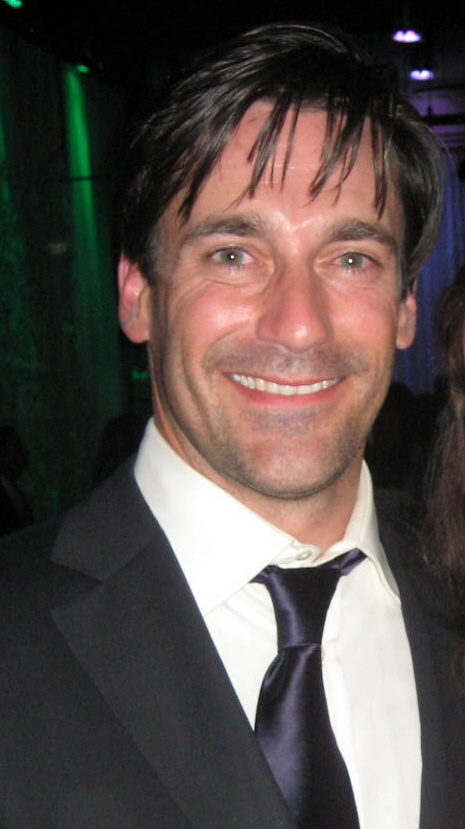
Jon Hamm made a guest appearance in the episode.

"Donnie Fatso" was written by Chris Cluess and directed by Ralph Sosa. The episode's plot and title are parodies of the film Donnie Brasco. The episode also features references to Goodfellas.

The opening sequence of "Donnie Fatso" featured a Fox News helicopter with the words "Merry Christmas from Fox News… But no other holidays." It was the third episode of the season to satirize Fox News in its opening sequence, having first done so in "The Fool Monty", in which helicopter can be seen hovering over New York City with the slogan "Fox News: Not Racist, But #1 With Racists". Bill O'Reilly, host of The O'Reilly Factor, harshly criticized the show, calling the producers "pinheads". He resumed: "Continuing to bite the hand that feeds part of it, Fox broadcasting once again allows its cartoon characters to run wild." In response, producers added a brief scene at the beginning of the opening sequence in the following episode, "How Munched Is That Birdie in the Window?", in which a helicopter appears bearing the slogan "Fox News: Unsuitable for Viewers Under 75." The scene was later removed from the opening sequence of "How Munched Is That Birdie in the Window?", and was replaced by one referencing the film King Kong.

=== Casting ===
In July 2010, it was announced that Jon Hamm would make a guest appearance in the episode as an agent for the FBI. In an interview with Entertainment Weekly, showrunner Al Jean was pleased with Hamm's performance, opining: "You gave him one note and he immediately did twelve great things with it. He was really funny. And handsome. He had it all. Hamm stated that appearing on the show was "an incredible experience". In his interview with Access Hollywood, he continued, "I got to work on The Simpsons, which I watched for 20 years and the show is still fresh and still funny and the characters still resonate. It’s one of the best shows on television. It was an honor to be asked to be a part of it." Joe Mantegna returned as Fat Tony, and voiced Fat Tony's cousin Fit Tony. When asked his feelings on the episode, Mantegna told Cracked.com, "when I first read that script, I was devastated. I thought, 'Oh f***, I'm done. Fat Tony's over."

== Reception ==
"Donnie Fatso" was first broadcast on December 12, 2010, on Fox. The episode was viewed by an estimated 7.31 million viewers with a 3.3/8 ratings share among adults 18-49. It was the lowest viewed broadcast in its timeslot, behind episodes of Extreme Makeover: Home Edition and The Amazing Race on ABC and CBS, as well as a football game between the Philadelphia Eagles and the Dallas Cowboys on NBC. "Donnie Fatso" was the third highest rated show of the week on Fox, only behind episodes of Glee and Family Guy.

=== Critical reception ===
The episode attained mixed receptions from television critics. Emily St. James of The A.V. Club rated the episode a 'C'. She felt that the episode was "fairly lazy", describing the main plot as "too much of a mob movie pastiche." Entertainment Weekly writer Darren Franich named Fat Tony's death the ninth Best TV Character Death of 2010, writing, "give the writers some credit for doing something different: In the middle of an otherwise straightforward mob-themed episode, they actually went ahead and killed off Fat Tony, a character who was first introduced almost twenty years ago." Lorenzo Tanos, writing for /Film, felt that Fat Tony's death was overall pointless. but the episode handled the swap between Fat Tony and Fit Tony well. Especially when compared to the similar circumstances in the season nine episode "The Principal and the Pauper".

Dan Castellaneta's performance in the episode, as various characters, was nominated for the Primetime Emmy Award for Outstanding Voice-Over Performance at the 63rd Primetime Emmy Awards. He lost to Maurice LaMarche for his role in the Futurama episode "Lrrreconcilable Ndndifferences". For his work on the episode, Chris Cluess was nominated for the Writers Guild of America Award for Outstanding Writing in Animation at the 64th Writers Guild of America Awards. Cluess lost to Joel H. Cohen for "Homer the Father", another episode of The Simpsons.
