= Love Is a Many Strangled Thing =

- The Simpsons episode
- Episode no.: Season 22; Episode 17
- Directed by: Mike Frank Polcino
- Written by: Bill Odenkirk
- Production code: NABF10
- Original air date: March 27, 2011

Guest appearances
- Kareem Abdul-Jabbar as himself; Kevin Michael Richardson as a masseuse; Paul Rudd as Dr. Zander

Episode features
- Chalkboard gag: "I will not ridicule teacher's Final Four bracket"
- Couch gag: The couch gag is done in the style of ASCII artwork, with Bart putting the word "Fatso" on Homer's chest and Homer replying "D'oh!" in a speech balloon.

Episode chronology
← Previous "A Midsummer's Nice Dream"	Next → "The Great Simpsina"
- The Simpsons season 22

"Love Is a Many Strangled Thing" is the seventeenth episode of the twenty-second season of the American animated television series The Simpsons. The episode was directed by Mike Frank Polcino and written by Bill Odenkirk. It first aired on Fox in the United States on March 27, 2011.

In this episode, Homer attends therapy to stop physically hurting Bart, which causes him to become a bully. Former basketball player Kareem Abdul-Jabbar and Paul Rudd guest starred. The episode received positive reviews.

== Plot ==
After saving Mr. Burns' life, Homer wins tickets to an NFL game between the Springfield Atoms and the Miami Dolphins, and takes the whole family. During the game, everybody starts to dance in front of the screen, but Bart does not want to dance, saying "Everybody Dance Now" is 'a little bossy' for his liking. Homer tries to make him dance by tickling him, inadvertently causing Bart to wet himself and humiliating him in front of the stadium crowd. To make matters worse, when the stadium owners take pity on Bart and try to dry his shorts off by opening the roof, Russian spy satellites capture the image of Bart with wet shorts, leading to widespread humiliation on the Internet, and an invasion by Russia, who see his urine-soaked shorts as a sign of American weakness.

Later that night, Marge tells off Homer for hurting Bart's feelings, and encourages him to enroll in a fathering enrichment class taught by therapist Dr. Zander. During the class, Homer casually mentions that he often strangles Bart for his bad behavior. Shocked to learn of Homer's violence towards Bart, Dr. Zander conducts a series of treatments in the next session. The towering basketball player Kareem Abdul-Jabbar teaches Homer what it feels like "to be young, small, and terrified" by strangling him mercilessly all the time, even going as far as letting his friends strangle Homer as well.

Unfortunately, the therapy works too well and Homer can no longer strangle Bart, even when the boy misbehaves, because he is traumatized by the session. Bart takes advantage of how the anger management sessions have turned Homer into a coward by becoming a school bully, as the school can no longer count on Homer's aggressiveness to protect them from Bart. Furious by Bart's abusive behavior towards Homer, Marge takes him to Dr. Zander to change his ways, but to her shock, she finds out that he has become homeless due to the current economic downturn. Marge desperately begs Dr. Zander to fix Bart and Homer for $23 and a can of beans, and Zander accepts.

Dr. Zander takes Bart and Homer on a trip while Marge and Lisa spend their time watching sad horse movies. During their trip, Zander tries several exercises to encourage Homer to have confidence in Bart but, unfortunately, Bart abuses Homer's ignorance and enjoys when he gets hurt, much to Zander's frustration. The ultimate test for Bart's and Homer's relationship is that Bart must save his father from being hanged in a tree, but Bart is more focused on text-pranking Moe than looking out for Homer's welfare. Dr. Zander, realizing just how annoying Bart is, snaps and tries to kill him, but Bart manages to free Homer, who saves him. In revenge for Zander's newfound behavior, Homer and Bart sue the psychologist, and are awarded his sole remaining possession: a hole in the large tree he lives in, a place where Homer and Bart finally reconcile and bond.

== Production ==
The opening sequence of the episode begins with the opening notes of the Futurama theme in place of usual theme, with the Planet Express ship flying across the screen. Futurama is another animated series created by Matt Groening, and was officially renewed for a seventh season the same week the episode aired.

Paul Rudd was cast as Dr. Zander, a therapist who is disturbed that Homer strangles Bart. Executive producer Al Jean remarked that no one had previously complained about Homer strangling Bart. Former basketball player Kareem Abdul-Jabbar appeared as himself in a Homer wig strangling Homer. Abdul-Jabbar thought his performance was the easiest of his career because he did not need to memorize lines or have a camera presence.

== Reception ==
In its original American broadcast, "Love is a Many Strangled Thing" was viewed by an estimated 6.14 million households, with a 2.8 Nielsen rating and 8 share of the audience between the ages of 18 and 49. This marked a slight rise in the ratings from the previous episode, "A Midsummer's Nice Dream."

The A.V. Club writer Rowan Kaiser called the episode "solid" commenting that "There was just a consistent stream of amusing lines, steadily increasing in frequency, until I realized that I'd been chuckling essentially from the start of the second act until the end of the fourth." He ultimately gave the episode a B+.

Eric Hochberger of TV Fanatic gave the episode 4 out of 5 stars. He called the episode "consistently funny" even though the story was not original.

In 2014, Paste named the episode the eighth worst episode of The Simpsons of all time.

=== Controversy ===
The episode was first broadcast on Channel 4, a British public service broadcaster, which had been airing the show since 5th November 2004, in December 2014, several years after the episode's actual UK debut on Sky One. The station edited parts, including the hanging scene, but still received two complaints. Channel 4 made further edits, but ten months later, by human error, showed the same cut of the episode. Complaints were made to Ofcom, the broadcasting standards authority, who deemed that the scenes of hanging and Homer not being able to resist being strangled by Kareem Abdul-Jabbar would be unsuitable for children. Channel 4 declared that the episode would only be shown again after 9 pm, the watershed for content.
