= A Midsummer's Nice Dream =

- The Simpsons episode
- Episode no.: Season 22; Episode 16
- Directed by: Steven Dean Moore
- Written by: Dan Castellaneta & Deb Lacusta
- Production code: NABF09
- Original air date: March 13, 2011

Guest appearances
- Tommy Chong as himself; Cheech Marin as himself

Episode features
- Chalkboard gag: "'Daylight Savings' is not a failed bank"
- Couch gag: The Simpsons run to the couch and a spring throws them off.

Episode chronology
← Previous "The Scorpion's Tale"	Next → "Love Is a Many Strangled Thing"
- The Simpsons season 22

"A Midsummer's Nice Dream" is the sixteenth episode of the twenty-second season of the American animated television series The Simpsons. The episode was directed by Steven Dean Moore and written by Dan Castellaneta and Deb Lacusta. It originally aired on the Fox network in the United States on March 13, 2011. The episode name is a play on the Shakespeare play A Midsummer Night's Dream and the Cheech & Chong movie Nice Dreams.

In this episode, Homer partners with Cheech Marin when Cheech & Chong break up while Marge helps the Crazy Cat Lady with her hoarding problem. Tommy Chong and Cheech Marin guest starred. The episode received negative reviews.

== Plot ==
The Simpsons are at a live Cheech and Chong show when Chong, upset by the act's repetitiveness, begins to improvise and ultimately leaves the stage. Homer is encouraged to take Chong's place on stage, and recites the "Dave's not here, man" act from memory. Cheech is impressed, and asks Homer to join him for the rest of the tour under the name "Cheech and Chunk." Homer is disillusioned to learn that Cheech and Chong's lives are different from their stoner personae. Meanwhile, Chong has replaced Cheech with Seymour Skinner, forming a duo called "Teech and Chong," but the team proves unsuccessful. Homer eventually convinces Cheech and Chong to reunite.

Meanwhile, Marge discovers that the Crazy Cat Lady is a hoarder. In an effort to help, Marge has the clutter removed from her home. But after loading the waste disposal truck, Marge begins removing items she sees as unique and valuable, eventually causing her own home to become cluttered. To cure Marge's new obsession, Homer brings back the Crazy Cat Lady, who ends up becoming a hoarder again after seeing all her old items.

In an epilogue Bart, posing as Puck, tells the audience the epilogue as well as that they can watch the show the next day on Hulu.com.

== Production ==
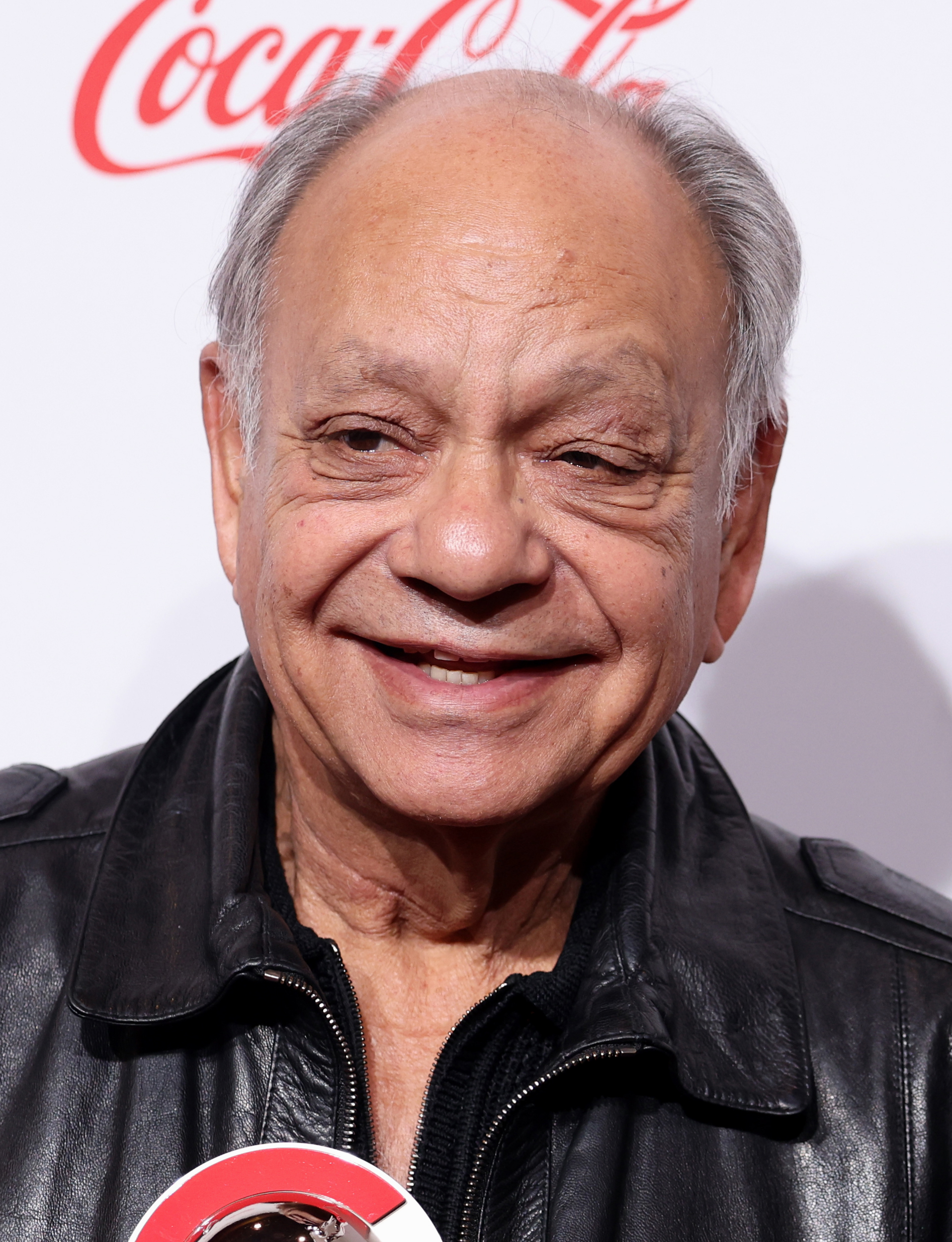
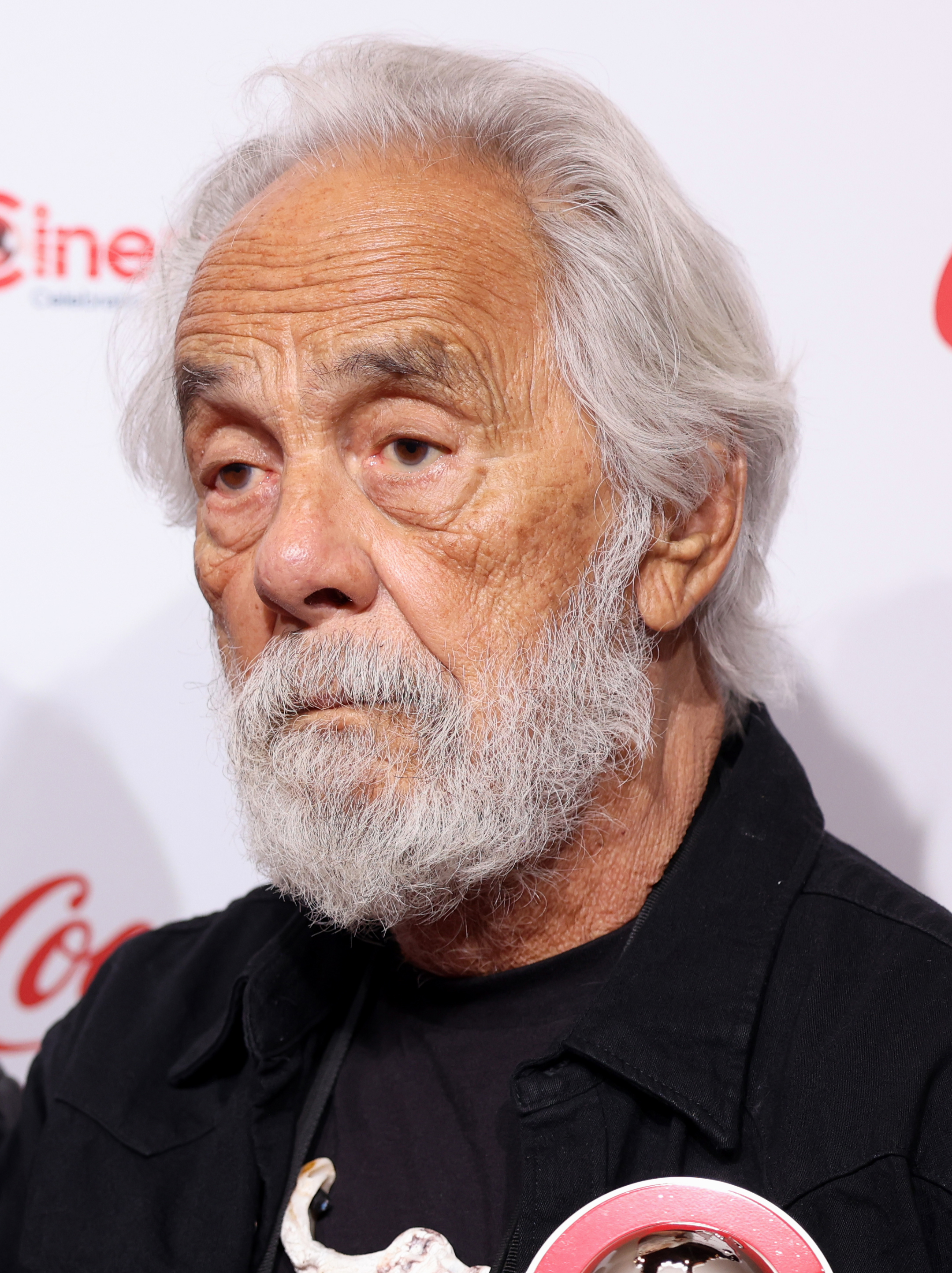
Cheech Marin and Tommy Chong (both pictured in 2025) guest starred as themselves.

In July 2010 at San Diego Comic-Con, executive producer Al Jean announced that Cheech Marin and Tommy Chong would appear as themselves. The episode was written by Dan Castellaneta and Deb Lacusta and parodies the comedy duo's twenty year separation. The two recorded their parts the previous month, and the recording process took several hours.

== Cultural references ==
Bart asks who Beavis and Butt-Head are when Homer compares them to Cheech & Chong.

== Reception ==
=== Viewing figures ===
In its original American broadcast, "A Midsummer's Nice Dream" was viewed by an estimated 5.448 million households and received a 2.5 rating/8 share among adults between the ages of 18 and 49. This means that it was seen by 2.5% of all 18- to 49-year-olds, and 8% of all 18- to 49-year-olds watching television at the time of the broadcast. This episode fell 11% in the ratings from the previous episode, making it the lowest rated episode of the season.

=== Critical response ===
The episode received generally negative reviews.

Rowan Kaiser of The A.V. Club gave the episode a D saying "I have no idea what The Simpsons was trying to do tonight" and called it the worst episode of the season.

Eric Hochberger of TV Fanatic gave the episode a 2.5/5, despite liking the season he criticized its use of guest voices and cited the episode as an example.

The Parents Television Council named "A Midsummer's Nice Dream" its Worst TV Show of the Week for the week ending March 18, 2011, for its subject matter; it was the first Simpsons episode to be so named. The PTC stated "The Simpsons may have been on the air for 22 years now (and counting), and while there are plenty of adults who watch the show, no one can deny that there is also a sizable audience of children. Since Cheech is portrayed as a strait-laced stick-in-the-mud, the subtle anti-drug messages in the show are completely lost. In the end, sober still equals boring."
