= 500 Keys =

- The Simpsons episode
- Episode no.: Season 22; Episode 21
- Directed by: Bob Anderson
- Written by: John Frink
- Production code: NABF14
- Original air date: May 15, 2011

Guest appearance
- Albert Brooks as Hank Scorpio

Episode features
- Chalkboard gag: "It's Kristen Schaal, not Kristen Schall" (first broadcast only) "Guinea pigs should not be used as 'guinea pigs'" (subsequent transmissions)
- Couch gag: Everyone and everything is represented as a word cloud.

Episode chronology
← Previous "Homer Scissorhands"	Next → "The Ned-Liest Catch"
- The Simpsons season 22

"500 Keys" is the twenty-first and penultimate episode of the twenty-second season of the American animated television series The Simpsons. It first aired on the Fox network in the United States on May 15, 2011. It was written by John Frink and directed by Bob Anderson.

In this episode, the Simpson family has adventures with the keys they have hoarded over the years, which leads Lisa to a mystery at Springfield Elementary. Albert Brooks made a cameo as Hank Scorpio. The episode received mixed reviews from critics.

== Plot ==
The Simpsons return home from an errand, but Maggie gets locked in the car. While searching for the spare key, Maggie frees herself, but they discover a collection of keys to every door in Springfield. At school, Lisa uses a key and finds a hidden classroom. She shares her discovery with Principal Skinner, but when she brings along the school newspaper, they find a bookshelf. Skinner and Superintendent Chalmers snatch the key from Lisa. She has the key replicated and finds the classroom hidden behind the shoddy bookshelf. She sees a mysterious figure writing "The children are on Bus 23" on the chalkboard.

Meanwhile, Bart causes mayhem with the keys but accidentally does good deeds and gets the key to the city. Marge and Maggie find a key for a wind-up toy that makes farting noises when it moves. The toy gets away from them, and they chase it around town. Homer uses a key to get into the Duff brewery with Barney and goes joyriding in the Duff blimp.

To get more information, Lisa and Bart ask Nelson who explains Bus 23 was a bus full of children that drove over an ice bridge but never returned. Homer flies them in the blimp to the river where the ice bridge would be. Lisa falls into the water where she sees the submerged Bus 23, and Homer dives in to save her. They find the children are mannequins. Homer and Lisa are saved by the wind-up toy, which knocks over a tree onto which they grab. The mysterious figure is revealed to be Otto, who drove Bus 23 and is relieved not to be responsible for the death of the children.

Bart forces Chalmers and Skinner to explain everything. Years earlier, the school received a grant for improving its classrooms. Skinner cashed the check but left the money in his pants pocket, and his mother destroyed it washing his laundry. Chalmers and Skinner built a fake classroom including rented mannequins and photographed it to keep the government from finding out. However, they could only afford to rent the mannequins and had to return them by 5:00 that afternoon to avoid being charged for an extra day and they didn’t prorate. While Otto was driving the mannequins to the rental office in Bus 23, the ice bridge collapsed and the bus fell into the river. Chalmers and Skinner apologize to Otto for letting him believe he killed the students.

Later, Otto drives his bus across an icy bridge, believing that the real children he is transporting are really mannequins. The bus falls into the river, and the episode ends with the sound of Otto searching for his keys to let the children off the bus to swim to shore.

== Production ==
The episode features a cameo from Albert Brooks as Hank Scorpio, a one-time character from the eighth season episode, "You Only Move Twice." The chalkboard gag was written to correct the error from the previous episode "Homer Scissorhands" where guest star Kristen Schaal's surname was spelled incorrectly as "Schall" in the credits. Schaal eventually thanked the producers for the name correction through Twitter. The blackboard gag "It's 'Schaal', not 'Schall'" was only seen in the televised version; the version that was streamed on Hulu.com, Disney+, and seen in televised reruns used the blackboard gag, "Guinea pigs should not be used as guinea pigs."

During the closing credits, the jingling of a set of keys is heard, followed by a solo violin rendition of the show's theme.

== Reception ==
In its original American broadcast on May 15, 2011, "500 Keys" was viewed by an estimated 6 million households and received a 2.5 rating/7 share among adults between the ages of 18 and 49. This means that it was seen by 2.5% of all 18- to 49-year-olds, and 7% of all 18- to 49-year-olds watching television at the time of the broadcast. The episode stayed even in the rating from the previous episode, "Homer Scissorhands."

Rowan Kaiser of The A.V. Club commented that while the episode was "amusing" it "never comes near great stuff" and also called the episode "disposable." He ultimately gave the episode a B.

Eric Hochberger of TV Fanatic gave the episode 4 out of 5 stars. He highlighted Lisa's and Homer's key stories, but felt Marge's and Bart's key stories were not as interesting.
