= The Great Simpsina =

- The Simpsons episode
- Episode no.: Season 22; Episode 18
- Directed by: Chris Clements
- Written by: Matt Warburton
- Production code: NABF11
- Original air date: April 10, 2011

Guest appearances
- David Copperfield as himself; Ricky Jay as himself; Martin Landau as The Great Raymondo; Jack McBrayer as Ewell Freestone; Penn & Teller as themselves

Episode chronology
← Previous "Love Is a Many Strangled Thing"	Next → "The Real Housewives of Fat Tony"
- The Simpsons season 22

"The Great Simpsina" is the eighteenth episode of the twenty-second season of the American animated television series The Simpsons. It originally aired on the Fox network in the United States on April 10, 2011. It was written by Matt Warburton and directed by Chris Clements. This episode was based on the 2002 film Spooky House, starring Ben Kingsley.

In this episode, Lisa is taught a magician's secrets but accidentally gives them to his rival when she falls for the rival's son. Martin Landau and Jack McBrayer guest starred. Magicians Ricky Jay and Penn & Teller appeared as themselves.

It was the first episode to have no opening sequence which includes the title screen, chalkboard gag, couch gag, and television with the creator and developers' credits since "Bart the General." Following its broadcast, the episode received mixed reviews from critics.

== Plot ==
The Simpsons go peach picking. They come back home with too many peaches, so they eat only recipes with peaches. After a while, all the family except Marge get tired of eating peaches. In an attempt to get rid of the peaches, Homer takes Marge to get a massage. Meanwhile, Bart, Lisa, and Maggie take the peaches to different locations. But, Bart no longer has his peaches when the school bullies take over. Lisa is then lost in a deserted area. A raccoon chases Lisa inside an illusionist's house. When the illusionist called "The Great Raymondo" finds her, he questions her and teaches her some magic tricks.

Lisa starts presenting magic tricks to the school, and to "The Great Raymondo". Eventually, Raymondo becomes fond of his apprentice and entrusts her with his most shielded secret, the trick of "The Great Milk Can Escape". Lisa presents this act at school and while signing autographs she meets a flattering boy who charms her into explaining the act. Shortly, it is revealed that the boy is the son of rival illusionist Cregg Demon, and merely used her to steal the secret of the Milk Can act, much to Lisa's shock. After Demon states that he is going to present it at his next show at an upcoming magic convention (he claims that he learned the trick after being met by the ghost of the trick's creator, Harry Houdini), a betrayed Raymondo rejects Lisa's apology and angrily orders her to leave his home. Lisa, saddened with guilt, tries to stop doing magic; however, Homer, saddened by his daughter's melancholy, tries to reassure her, only for her to start crying as Homer comforts her. Homer goes to Raymondo's mansion to demands he forgive his daughter, but gets caught in a diamond-patterned net. Homer asks Raymondo to release him from the net and to forgive Lisa.

After some thinking, Raymondo decides to offer Lisa a chance to redeem herself by helping him stop Demon from performing the Milk Can act. At the convention, Demon gets trapped inside the milk can and risks being drowned. Lisa tries to step in to save him, but is stopped by Ricky Jay, David Copperfield and Penn & Teller (in their second guest appearance on the show), who reveal they had replaced the fake milk can with a real one so that Demon will be unable to escape, thus eliminating him as competition to them. After a fight, Raymondo saves him by making a girder fall onto the magicians, and Demon decides to quit magic. At the end, Raymondo and Lisa do their act, with Lisa wowing the audience and Raymondo attempting to get high from inhaling enough ether to see a hallucination of his late wife and former assistant Esther.

== Production ==
Martin Landau guest starred as The Great Raymondo. Jack McBrayer was cast as Ewell Freestone. McBrayer recorded his lines in the summer of 2010 with Dan Castellaneta and Yeardley Smith. Magicians David Copperfield, Ricky Jay, and Penn & Teller appeared as themselves.

== Cultural references ==
- Cregg Demon Magicfreak is a parody of real illusionist Criss Angel: Mindfreak.
- Milkshake by Kelis plays during Cregg's attempt at the Great Milk Can Escape.
- Ali Rudy Vallée, the musical automaton, is a parody of The Turk.
- The episode follows along the plot of the film Spooky House.

== Reception ==
=== Ratings ===
In its original American broadcast, "The Great Simpsina" was viewed by an estimated 4.996 million households and received a 2.3 rating/7 share among adults between the ages of 18 and 49, marking an eighteen percent drop from the previous episode.

=== Critical response ===
Eric Hochberger of TV Fanatic gave the episode a rating of 3.8/5.0 stars, writing "From [the opening], The Great Simpsina because [sic] a typical Lisa episode of The Simpsons. You know you're in for a clever storyline with plenty of heart, but not so much in the humor department...Overall, the episode was entertaining and flowed nicely throughout, but just lacked the funnier moments I've become accustomed to during this strong season".

Rowan Kaiser of The A.V. Club rated "The Great Simpsina" a B−, stating "Tonight's episode was an almost Platonic example of the modern Simpsons trying to recreate the glory years and not quite getting there. It has all the ingredients: a weird, irrelevant opening act, an investigation into a quirky aspect of American culture, and a single new character/guest star altering one of the Simpsons' lives temporarily...the jokes generally landed when they were made, and the ending was surprisingly sweet. It was just unfortunately non-essential".
