= Moms I'd Like to Forget =

- The Simpsons episode
- Episode no.: Season 22; Episode 10
- Directed by: Chris Clements
- Written by: Brian Kelley
- Production code: NABF03
- Original air date: January 9, 2011

Episode features
- Chalkboard gag: "January is not Bart History Month"
- Couch gag: The family couch prepares for a day of being sat on by the Simpsons.

Episode chronology
← Previous "Donnie Fatso"	Next → "Flaming Moe"
- The Simpsons season 22

"Moms I'd Like to Forget" is the tenth episode of the twenty-second season of the American animated television series The Simpsons. It originally aired on the Fox network in the United States on January 9, 2011. In the episode, Marge reveals that she used to be in a group called "The Cool Moms" and decides to reconnect with the group. It was directed by Chris Clements and written by Brian Kelley.

"Moms I'd Like to Forget" received mixed reviews from critics and acquired a Nielsen rating of 6.9. The name of this episode also plays on the acronym MILF.

== Plot ==
The episode opens with a dodge ball match between the 4th and 5th graders. Bart ends up hitting the last 5th grader, but he catches it after it comes back down, making the 5th graders win the match. In the days that follow, the 4th and 5th graders commit acts of war against each other, even dragging the teachers into it when a 5th grade teacher insults Edna Krabappel's class and it sparks a mass teacher brawl in the faculty room (in reference to a scene in the 1973 film Westworld). Eventually it gets to the point that they organize a fight after school. Before the fight begins, however, Bart realizes that one of the 5th graders has the same scar as he does, in the shape of a sword on his fist.

Bart confronts Marge about the scar. Marge explains that when he was in preschool, he was in a "Mommy and Me" class with three other kids. Marge became very close with the other mothers, and they became "the Cool Moms." However, the other kids were a bad influence on Bart. But she does not explain the scar. Marge then decides to get back together with her old group.

Marge's old friends reconcile while Bart gets together with the other kids, where he realizes he still does not know where the scar came from. Marge and her friends decide to get together every Tuesday. Meeting with the other kids every week, their antics become more and more dangerous, so Bart decides to break up the group. Knowing they broke up before, Bart realizes it must have something to do with the scar and consults Dr. Hibbert, who suggests he ask Comic Book Guy.

Comic Book Guy is reluctant to explain but, after some coercion, he reveals what happened: About seven years ago, on the 4th of July, he was in charge of the fireworks. While Marge and the other moms talked, Bart and the boys stumbled off towards the fireworks controls and pressed all the buttons, setting off all the fireworks. In the fiery explosion that followed, Comic Book Guy's sandwich was hit by a firework, sending the burning hot, sword-shaped skewers onto the boys' fists, branding them.

Knowing it was an explosion that split the group apart, Bart and Milhouse create a big ball of firecrackers to break them up again. When Marge catches them in the act, Bart confesses. That evening, Marge tells the group of Bart's scheme to break them up, and they tell her Bart was always a bad influence to their kids. Marge becomes angry and leaves the group in a rage. After Marge's outrage and leaving of the group, the remaining women all start making out with each other.

Returning home, Marge is comforted by Bart and Lisa, who suggest that they become her friends instead. Meanwhile, Homer, unaware of Marge’s exit from the group, has another awkward meet-up with the other women’s husbands due to Marge believing that he enjoys their company. When Ned Flanders shows up, Homer embraces him, happy to see someone that he knows and possesses no contempt for him.

== Production ==
"Moms I'd Like to Forget" was written by Brian Kelley making it his sixth writing credit for the series. The episode was directed by series regular Chris Clements also making the episode his sixth credit for the series.

== Reception ==
In its original American broadcast, "Moms I'd Like to Forget" was viewed by an estimated 12.65 million households and received a 5.7 rating/14 share among adults between the ages of 18 and 49 ranking first in its timeslot. The episode marked a 78% rise in the ratings from the previous episode, "Donnie Fatso." The larger-than-normal viewership was a result of the episode following the National Football League's playoffs. It became the highest Nielsen rating of the show since the season twenty-one episode "Once Upon a Time in Springfield" and finished 5th in the ratings for the week of January 3 to January 9, 2011. The episode also became the highest rated scripted program of the week it aired and the highest rated show on Fox.

Rowan Kaiser of The A.V. Club rated the episode with a C+ writing that she felt "The entire episode just seems to be hurtling towards a reset button: Of course Marge isn't going to end up with three new best friends, and of course Bart isn't going to have an entirely new crew to hang out with. The writers seem to know this, and the resolution is half-assed at best."

Eric Hochberger of TV Fanatic gave the episode 3.5 out of 5 stars. He stated that the best parts were the visual gags, and he highlighted Homer's attempt to talk to the other husbands.
