= The Scorpion's Tale =

- The Simpsons episode
- Episode no.: Season 22; Episode 15
- Directed by: Matthew Schofield
- Written by: Billy Kimball; Ian Maxtone-Graham
- Production code: NABF08
- Original air date: March 6, 2011

Guest appearances
- Werner Herzog as Walter Hotenhoffer; Kevin Michael Richardson as Springfield Retirement Castle orderly

Episode features
- Chalkboard gag: "I'm not here on a spitball scholarship"
- Couch gag: A person playing The Simpsons couch gag game, chooses the Simpsons family in the style of an RPG character creator, and they go running to the couch. Afterwards, it says "game over."

Episode chronology
← Previous "Angry Dad: The Movie"	Next → "A Midsummer's Nice Dream"
- The Simpsons season 22

"The Scorpion's Tale" is the fifteenth episode of the twenty-second season of the American animated television series The Simpsons. The episode was directed by Matthew Schofield and written by Billy Kimball and Ian Maxtone-Graham. It originally aired on the Fox network in the United States on March 6, 2011.

In this episode, Lisa discovers a chemical that makes the elderly happier, but it also has a dangerous side effect. Filmmaker Werner Herzog guest starred. The episode received mixed reviews.

== Plot ==
During a trip to "Satan's Anvil," the students and faculty of Springfield Elementary stumble into bizarre people and situations: Otto runs over "realistic" versions of Coyote and Road Runner; Martin meets an eccentric and grumpy hermit artist that the government tried to hire for years but never succeeded; Bart, Nelson and Milhouse find old French postcards; and Lisa is almost attacked by scorpions, but they quickly become passive after Lisa passes through a field of silvertongue flowers in Springfield's desert, prompting her to take the scorpions and some flowers for further experiments.

When they return home, the Simpsons family is forced to let Grampa live at their house, after he was kicked out of the old folks home for being too grumpy. After Lisa confirms that the flower has a powerful chemical agent that nullifies all the negative feelings of any living being, Homer sneaks some into his father's coffee, curing his usual crankiness. Grampa decides to do this daily, acknowledging that a drug that stimulates happiness is the best thing that ever happened in his bitter life.

Unfortunately, despite the positive effects, Lisa refuses to give more of this drug, or to tell them the composition. While they complain about it at Moe's Tavern, a drug industry employee from Hottenhoffer Pharmaceuticals named Walter Hotenhoffer (formerly known as Augustus Gloop) manages to duplicate the liquid's effects using a sample of Grampa's perspiration. Hottenhoffer produces "MusBeNys" pills, but since the product has not been properly tested, only Grampa is allowed to use them. Unfortunately, Bart decides to sell some of the pills to everyone who has a problem with grumpy old people, making all the elderly people in Springfield becoming happy and carefree.

Lisa eventually realizes that Grampa is still using the drug, but she also admits that the pills are rather helpful to him. However, the drug's side effect quickly arises: it makes everyone's eyes become so lubricated that they pop out of their sockets. The elderly people do not mind this rather gruesome aspect of the drug, but upon seeing Homer's thoughtless antics with his friends and his car, Grampa convinces the old people to stop using the pills, saying that the Baby Boomer generation still needs their guidance, and this is only possible with their constant nagging. In the end, everything turns back to normal (except Hotenhoffer, who still has nightmares regarding what happened at Wonka's factory).

== Production ==
Director Werner Herzog guest starred as a pharmaceutical executive. When approached by the producers to appear, Herzog did not understand the request because he thought The Simpsons was a comic strip. He was sent a DVD of the show and thought the humor was "wonderful" and "subversive." He said he enjoyed working on the episode. Creator Matt Groening named Herzog one of his favorite guest stars.

Jackie Mason was listed in the FOX press release as a guest star, but was not credited in the episode.

== Cultural references ==
The Wile E. Coyote and Road Runner series is parodied in the episode with a real coyote chasing a real roadrunner. The music playing during this scene is inspired by "The Dance of the Comedians" from The Bartered Bride by Bedřich Smetana.

Mr. Burns sitting on a throne down by the seashore and failing to command the tide to obey him is a reference to the tale of king Cnut the Great as ruler of the waves.

The song playing during the montage of Lisa walking through the desert is "Gassenhauer," composed by Carl Orff. The orchestral music playing during the scenes of newly nice senior citizens playing outdoors is modeled on a theme from the first movement of Symphony No. 1 in D by Gustav Mahler. Ending credits music modeled on music by Thomas Newman from the closing credits from The Player.

Walter Hotenhoffer reveals that he is actually Augustus Gloop from the Roald Dahl book Charlie and the Chocolate Factory saying, "Ja, it is true I am Gloop. Being stuck in that tube changed me in so many ways."

== Reception ==
The episode received a 2.8/8 in the 18-49 share, and 6.20 million viewers, slightly edged out by the new Family Guy in the Animation Domination block.

Rowan Kaiser of The A.V. Club gave the episode a B−, praising Herzog's performance, but finding Lisa's varying opinions throughout the episode annoying.

Eric Hochberger of TV Fanatic gave the episode 3.5 out of 5 stars. He felt Werner Herzog was not used correctly and that the pharmaceutical story was a repeat of past stories.
