= Angry Dad: The Movie =

- The Simpsons episode
- Promotional image for the episode
- Episode no.: Season 22; Episode 14
- Directed by: Matthew Nastuk
- Written by: John Frink
- Production code: NABF07
- Original air date: February 20, 2011

Guest appearances
- Halle Berry as herself; Russell Brand as himself; Ricky Gervais as himself; Maurice LaMarche as Herman Millwood; Nick Park as himself; J. B. Smoove as DJ Kwanzaa; Terry W. Greene as Ridley Scott's Seat Filler

Episode features
- Couch gag: The Simpsons are hockey players who are sent to the penalty box for fighting with each other.
- Commentary: Matt Groening; Al Jean; John Frink; Matt Selman; Nick Park; Nancy Cartwright

Episode chronology
← Previous "The Blue and the Gray"	Next → "The Scorpion's Tale"
- The Simpsons season 22

"Angry Dad: The Movie'" is the fourteenth episode of the twenty-second season of the American animated television series The Simpsons. It originally aired on the Fox network in the United States on February 20, 2011. In this episode, Bart wins many awards for his new short film based on his web cartoon series Angry Dad, which was first introduced in "I Am Furious (Yellow)", while Homer takes credit for the film during acceptance speeches.

"Angry Dad: The Movie" was written by John Frink and directed by Matthew Nastuk, with Ricky Gervais, Halle Berry, Russell Brand, Maurice LaMarche, Nick Park and J. B. Smoove guest starring. Cultural references in the episode include Pixar, Toy Story, Wallace and Gromit, Kung Fu Panda, Ms. Pac-Man and the 68th Golden Globe Award ceremony.

The episode was viewed in an estimated 6.35 million households, with a 2.8 Nielsen rating, marking a slight rise in audience from the previous episode, while the episode was the twenty-fifth most viewed show for the week of broadcast among adults aged 18 to 49.

Critical reception of the episode was generally positive, with critics praising the episode's use of visual gags and cultural references.

== Plot ==
After Bart once again recklessly causes damage to the house while the rest of the family are out on Saturday, he is surprised by a visit from Herman Millwood, the owner of a furniture company. When the producers of Bart's "Angry Dad" Internet series went bankrupt years earlier, Millwood seized their intellectual property assets to settle the bill they owed him for their office chairs. He offers Bart a chance to make a film adaptation of "Angry Dad". Bart accepts, and Millwood takes him to film studio animators. Homer is soon offered the opportunity to voice Angry Dad, as the voice actor from the original Angry Dad series has dropped out of frustration of never being paid. The film is test screened to a horrible reception. Lisa convinces Bart to remove all of the parts the audience did not like, thus making Angry Dad a short film. The film is shortly thereafter nominated for a Golden Globe Award for Best Animated Short.

At the Golden Globe ceremony, Angry Dad wins, and Homer angers Bart by pushing him out of the way and taking all the credit despite not being professional or supportive of the film before it was a hit. Homer takes credit at many other awards ceremonies. Angry Dad soon receives an Academy Award nomination for Best Animated Short Film. Out of frustration against Homer for taking the credit, Bart attempts to distract Homer from going by making him and Marge go on an attraction tour in Los Angeles while he and Lisa attend the awards. However, Homer gets recognized by the friendly Rollin' 80 street gang who take him to the ceremony. Homer arrives in time to see Angry Dad win the Oscar. Bart goes up to accept the Oscar and thanks Lisa for having the idea to make the film into a short film, the animation studio, and Homer. Touched by this, Homer gets up on stage with Bart and apologizes to him for taking all the credit, and the two agree to cut up the Oscar and give a piece to everyone on the animation team. Bart asks if Homer had gotten a replacement from the Academy, but Homer confides to him that the Award is only five dollars on eBay, while Maggie is sucking on the replacement.

== Production ==
Angry Dad first appeared in the season 13 episode "I Am Furious (Yellow)". In the show, it is a comic book and web series that Bart created based on Homer's constant fits of rage. In this episode, Bart and Homer make a short film about the character, which wins a number of awards. Executive producer Al Jean said it is "a bit of a satire of the different Oscar acceptances where two people clearly race to the stage to get there first, and Homer and Bart are fighting to be the one that accepts." Academy Award winner Halle Berry guest starred as herself. She was designed to be wearing a similar dress to the one she wore at the 74th Academy Awards in 2002. Ricky Gervais appeared as himself, his second guest appearance on the show after season 17's "Homer Simpson, This Is Your Wife". Comedian Russell Brand guest starred as himself.

== Cultural references ==
This episode of The Simpsons featured multiple references to animation and Hollywood. Pixar is referenced in the episode as "Mixar". Herman Millwood and the Aerochair are a spoof of furniture company Herman Miller, which made the Aeron chairs that were very popular with the dot-com bubble-era web startups. The "1999" segment features the song "Bye Bye Bye" by NSYNC. When attempting to encourage Bart to make the movie a short film, Lisa mentions how directors such as Wes Anderson, Frank Tashlin and Tim Burton started out making short films. The short film Condiments serves as a parody of the Pixar film Toy Story, and the song "You've Got an Enemy" (sung by Castellaneta impersonating Randy Newman) references "You've Got a Friend in Me". Willis and Crumble parodies Wallace & Gromit, and uses the same style of stop-motion animation. Nick Park, the creator of Wallace & Gromit, has a voice cameo as himself. Multiple other short film fragments further lampooned other movies including some French adult animated films The Triplets of Belleville and Persepolis. The episode also references Ricky Gervais's controversial hosting stunt at the 68th Golden Globe Awards, with a sign featuring a picture of him alongside a caption reading "Do Not Allow This Man To Host".

== Reception ==
In its original American broadcast, "Angry Dad: The Movie" was viewed by an estimated 6.35 million households, with a 2.8 Nielsen rating and 8 share of the audience among adults between the ages of 18 and 49. The episode marked a slight rise in the ratings from the previous episode, "The Blue and the Gray". "Angry Dad: The Movie" was the twenty-fifth most viewed show for the week of broadcast among adults aged 18–49.

"Angry Dad: The Movie" received generally positive reviews from critics, with many of them praising the "visual gags" featured in the episode.

TV Squad writer Brad Trechak praised the episode's use of Hollywood references writing that "that's what good episodes of 'The Simpsons' are made of". He also praised Gervais's performance calling his two monologues "classic".

The A.V. Club's Rowan Kaiser praised the multiple references layered in the episode commenting that they saved the episode from being "mediocre". Despite this, she criticized the plot commenting that it did not come "from the heart of the show". She ultimately gave the episode a B−.

Ken Tucker of Entertainment Weekly mostly praised the short films competing against "Angry Dad" calling them "the truly amusing stuff" and adding that Condiments was a "very accomplished replication of Pixar". However, he was critical of the guest stars, noting that, "None of them were very funny, but that was the joke — they were parodying the toadying tone of awards patter. Well, Brand and Berry were; Gervais seemed to have improvised a lot of Gervais-y stream-of-jokiness blather that he may well have intended to be funny".

Aly Semigran of MTV praised the episode for its animation parodies, writing, "Sure, Toy Story and Wallace and Gromit might enjoy more Oscar love than their animated brethren, but The Simpsons send-ups were nothing if not a brilliant tip-of-the-hat to all of those films". Screen Rant called it the best episode of the 22nd season.

The episode was nominated for the Primetime Emmy Award for Outstanding Animated Program (for Programming Less Than One Hour) at the 63rd Primetime Emmy Awards, but lost to the Futurama episode "The Late Philip J. Fry".
