= Homer Scissorhands =

- The Simpsons episode
- Episode no.: Season 22; Episode 20
- Directed by: Mark Kirkland
- Written by: Peter Gaffney; Steve Viksten
- Production code: NABF13
- Original air date: May 8, 2011

Guest appearance
- Kristen Schaal as Taffy (incorrectly credited as "Kristen Schall")

Episode features
- Chalkboard gag: "I do not deserve a Mother's Day gift for being 'one badass mother'"
- Couch gag: The couch is on display at the Smithsonian Museum a la Archie Bunker's chair. The Simpsons break in and sit down as normal.

Episode chronology
← Previous "The Real Housewives of Fat Tony"	Next → "500 Keys"
- The Simpsons season 22

"Homer Scissorhands" is the twentieth episode of the twenty-second season of the American animated television series The Simpsons. The episode was directed by Mark Kirkland and written by Peter Gaffney and Steve Viksten. It first aired on the Fox network in the United States on May 8, 2011.

Kristen Schaal guest stars in the episode as Taffy. This episode sees Milhouse dating Taffy after Lisa rejected his romantic confession. Seeing the two together makes Lisa question her own feelings for him. Meanwhile, Homer becomes a hairdresser after cutting Patty's hair.

This episode was the last episode to be shown in the UK of season 22 during August 2011. The season continued on October 30, when "500 Keys" first aired.

This episode was co-written by Steve Viksten, who died on June 23, 2014; it was his final writing credit.

== Plot ==
After Bart and Lisa accidentally throw paint into Patty's hair, Homer uses garden shears to cut the remaining hair, miraculously styling it. Selma demands that Homer style her hair as well, and he soon becomes Springfield's most popular hairdresser. Soon, he is styling hair for Helen Lovejoy, Luann Van Houten, Manjula Nahasapeemapetilon and numerous other women in Springfield. However, he discovers that listening to the inane chatter upsets and angers him. He even attempts to commit suicide by drinking a jar of disinfectant. Complaining to Moe and the other barflies, Homer realises that he cannot even look at the men in the bar without seeing everything that the women dislike about them. Eventually, after declaring that he can hear the hair growing around town, Homer styles Marge's hair for a party, and they pretend that Julio created the hairstyle instead. Julio is immediately surrounded by women demanding that he style them, too.

Meanwhile, Milhouse has a life-changing experience after watching Finding Nemo from the beginning. Previously, he and Bart only watched the film from "Chapter 2", which takes place after Nemo's mother has died. Deciding that, since death can happen to a fish, it can happen to anyone, he decides to live each day as if it were his last. He professes his love for Lisa, even "writing" her a love song (to the tune of "Greensleeves"). Lisa rejects his love, but he manages to impress a fifth-grade girl named Taffy (Kristen Schaal). Taffy and Milhouse begin to date, but Lisa fears that Taffy is only using him, and begins to spy on them both. Her appearance annoys Taffy, who decides that Milhouse will never love her as he is too obsessed with Lisa, and she leaves. Distraught, Milhouse asks Lisa just how upset she wants him to be in life. Lisa, feeling guilty for really hurting him, gives him a kiss to make him feel better. Milhouse asks if that means Lisa likes him. Not sure what to say at first, Lisa eventually says that life has unexpected things to offer and urges him not to give up searching for love. Milhouse then faints off a cliff but is rescued by an eagle. Lisa just smiles, glad to see him cheered up.

== Production ==
This is the first and only episode co-written by Steve Viksten, a freelance writer who co-developed the Nickelodeon animated series Hey Arnold! (which featured regular Simpsons cast member Dan Castellaneta and recurring Simpsons cast member Tress MacNeille).

The plot of Homer becoming a hairdresser was an unused side story idea from the fourth season episode "New Kid on the Block" after the planned B-story of Homer fighting with Don Rickles after Rickles insults him during a stand-up show was rejected. Kristen Schaal guest stars as Taffy, although her surname is spelled incorrectly as "Schall" in the credits. The chalkboard gag from the following episode "500 Keys" was written to correct the error.

== Cultural references ==
- The episode title is a reference to the 1990 film Edward Scissorhands directed by Tim Burton and starring Johnny Depp in the title role. During the episode, Homer tells Marge to just call him "Homer Fingerhands." Several scenes parallel the film, such as Homer rapidly styling hair with garden shears mirroring Edward sculpting hedges and ice. The episode's musical score also features instrumentation reminiscent of Danny Elfman's soundtrack for the film.
- Lady Gaga is mentioned by Helen Lovejoy, who notes that her husband has given up on basing his weekly sermons on episodes of Seinfeld in favor of discussing the pop singer.
- While cutting Helen Lovejoy's hair, Homer becomes overwhelmed by her gossip and attempts to commit suicide by drinking a jar of blue comb disinfectant. This sequence parodies the Seinfeld reunion storyline from Curb Your Enthusiasm, where a character attempts suicide by drinking Barbicide.
- Homer's hair salon, Are We Hair Yet?, is a parody of the 2005 family comedy film Are We There Yet? starring Ice Cube.
- Homer makes a reference to Warren Beatty and the 1975 satirical comedy-drama film Shampoo, in which Beatty plays a successful hairdresser.
- Selma compares Patty's new haircut to Victoria Beckham ("Posh Spice") from the Spice Girls, while Homer objects that he was trying to replicate the hairstyle of Mel B ("Scary Spice").
- The romantic ballad that Milhouse writes and performs for Lisa in the school cafeteria utilizes the exact melody of the traditional English folk song "Greensleeves."

== Reception ==
=== Viewing figures ===
In its original American broadcast on May 8, 2011, "Homer Scissorhands" was viewed by an estimated 5.480 million households and received a 2.5 rating/8 share among adults between the ages of 18 and 49. This means that it was seen by 2.5% of all 18- to 49-year-olds, and 8% of all 18- to 49-year-olds watching television at the time of the broadcast. This marked a 7 percent drop in the ratings from the previous episode.

=== Critical response ===
Rowan Kaiser of The A.V. Club gave the episode a C−. Kaiser felt the main plot was neither terrible nor good and that Kristen Schaal's appearance was wasted in the subplot.

Eric Hochberger of TV Fanatic gave the episode 3.8 out of 5 stars. He highlighted the jokes and visual gags in the main plot, but he also felt Schaal was not used properly.

In 2022, Comic Book Resources ranked the episode's couch gag as the eighth best couch gag in Simpsons history.
