= Flaming Moe =

- The Simpsons episode
- Episode no.: Season 22; Episode 11
- Directed by: Chuck Sheetz
- Written by: Matt Selman
- Production code: NABF04
- Original air date: January 16, 2011

Guest appearances
- Alyson Hannigan as Melody Juniper; Scott Thompson as Grady; Kristen Wiig as Calliope Juniper

Episode features
- Couch gag: The couch is a bowl. An arm releases five scoops of ice cream resembling the Simpsons into the bowl and tops it with chocolate syrup, whipped cream and a cherry. Santa's Little Helper eats the sundae and belches.

Episode chronology
← Previous "Moms I'd Like to Forget"	Next → "Homer the Father"
- The Simpsons season 22

"Flaming Moe" is the eleventh episode of the twenty-second season of the American animated television series The Simpsons. The episode was directed by Chuck Sheetz and written by Matt Selman. It originally aired on the Fox network in the United States on January 16, 2011.

It follows the efforts of Waylon Smithers to earn Mr. Burns' respect by turning Moe's Tavern into a successful gay bar, leading Moe to become more popular as a gay man than Smithers. Meanwhile, Principal Skinner looks for love with the substitute music teacher. Alyson Hannigan, Scott Thompson, and Kristen Wiig guest starred. The episode received positive reviews.

== Plot ==
Waylon Smithers learns that he is not included in Mr. Burns' will, the main beneficiary now being Burns' pet giant tortoise. When he confronts Burns, he tells Smithers he only respects "self-made men." Dejected, Smithers tries to cheer himself up by going to "The League of Extra Horny Gentlemen," a gay bar, but is denied entrance because he is not as attractive or fashionable as the rest of the clientele. Stopping by Moe's Tavern instead, he notices how slow business is and proposes to Moe that they refurbish his bar and make it into a gay bar, with the encouragement of other gays who were not accepted into the other lookist bar. Smithers hopes to earn Mr. Burns' respect by building a successful business in addition to having a place in which he can feel accepted. They turn Moe's into an ultra-trendy gay bar called Mo's. Mo's new patrons come to believe that Moe too is gay, a misconception he encourages for fear of losing their business. He becomes more popular than Smithers, so popular with the local gay community that they push Moe to run for the city council to become the first "openly gay" council member.

Smithers attempts to "out" Moe as straight while Moe is announcing his candidacy by demanding that Smithers kiss him. Puckering his lips, Moe leans into Smithers, but at the last minute cannot and announces that he was lying. Moe asks for forgiveness and hopes that they understand his need to be accepted; he also points out that if they do not support him, his ultra-homophobic, latent opponent may win. The crowd is nevertheless disheartened and angry, and leaves. Before Moe leaves, he grabs Smithers and kisses him, afterward saying "Like frisbee golf, I'm glad I tried it once." The credits end as Mo's is renovated back to the old Moe's Tavern again.

Meanwhile, Principal Skinner tries to date the substitute music teacher, Calliope Juniper (Kristen Wiig), and sets her daughter Melody (Alyson Hannigan) up with Bart as an excuse to spend time with her. Even though Melody idolizes Bart, he cannot stand her and eventually breaks up with her. Ms. Juniper quits her job and she and Melody move out of town. She asks Skinner to come with them and he accepts. He returns three months later, saddened by the end of the relationship but content that he was able to maintain it for as long as he did.

== Production ==
"Flaming Moe" was written by Matt Selman and was directed by Chuck Sheetz, both their first credit for the season. The episode also featured guest appearances by actress Alyson Hannigan and actress and comedian Kristen Wiig. Hannigan played the daughter of the substitute music teacher whom Skinner sets up with Bart to get closer to the teacher. Comedian Scott Thompson reprised his role as Grady from previous episodes.

== Cultural references ==
Moe's run for office is an homage to the plot of the film Milk. Moe points to photos of previous episodes when he relaunched his bar, such as "Bart Sells His Soul" (a family restaurant), "Homer the Moe" (a trendy new bar), and "Mommie Beerest" (a British pub). The episode's title is a play on season 3 episode "Flaming Moe's" (which also centered on Moe's bar). Moe's renovated bar name is a reference to "The League of Extraordinary Gentlemen". In the scene where Moe's Tavern is successfully running as a popular gay bar, the character Bumblebee Man is shown in the crowd holding up a sign that reads, "Furries Fur Moe", a reference to the Furry Fandom

== Reception ==
In its original American broadcast, "Flaming Moe" was viewed by an estimated 6.38 million households and received a 3.1 rating/8 share among adults between the ages of 18 and 49, ranking third in its timeslot.

Rowan Kaiser of The A.V. Club gave the episode a B+, stating, "this was a very good episode of The Simpsons. The guest stars added instead of subtracting, it had a gently satirical inverse of gay panic jokes, and it was pretty damn funny... It's another strong Simpsons episode in a surprisingly strong season.”

Eric Hochberger of TV Fanatic gave the episode 4 out of 5 stars. He stated that the episode succeeded in making him laugh but felt Hannigan's and Wiig's appearances were underused.
