= The Blue and the Gray (The Simpsons) =

- The Simpsons episode
- Episode no.: Season 22; Episode 13
- Directed by: Bob Anderson
- Written by: Rob LaZebnik
- Production code: NABF06
- Original air date: February 13, 2011

Episode features
- Chalkboard gag: "I will not make fun of Cupid's dink"
- Couch gag: Homer injures himself on the way to the couch, with Barney substituting for him à la a basketball player while Homer is carried away by a stretcher.

Episode chronology
← Previous "Homer the Father"	Next → "Angry Dad: The Movie"
- The Simpsons season 22

"The Blue and the Gray" is the thirteenth episode in the twenty-second season of the American animated television series The Simpsons. The episode was directed by Bob Anderson and written by Rob LaZebnik. It originally aired on the Fox network in the United States on February 13, 2011.

In this episode, Marge decides to leave her hair in its natural gray color while Homer helps find women to be with Moe. The episode received mixed reviews.

== Plot ==
After spending another Valentine's Day alone, Moe attends a seminar led by Dr. Kissingher in the hopes of gaining more confidence with women. Moe takes the doctor’s advice and asks Homer to be his wingman. Also, Marge discovers her first grey hairs, only to find out from her hairdresser that she is completely grey; the fumes from the chemicals he uses to dye it erase her memory. Seeing a grey-haired couple having a good time unworried about their hair, Marge surprises both her family and the neighborhood by going completely gray. Amidst mixed reactions, Bart is not happy when the neighborhood kids tease him about Marge’s look and Marge is annoyed when neighborhood women believe she is older than she really is.

Unhappy about Marge's look, Homer initially tells her she is his "silver belle" to appease her but subsequently spends more time helping Moe with women in order to avoid looking at her, during which he becomes increasingly popular with the young ladies. Later, Patty and Selma point out to Marge Homer's true feelings about her look (noting that Homer would not try to be "clever" if he really liked it), this only being made the more obvious to her when two women gossip about Homer going to a club that night. A jealous Marge heads to the club to surprise Homer but suffers increasing mishaps resulting in her having a witch-like appearance. At the club, she confronts him upon seeing a crowd of women flirting with him but Homer helps Marge realize that he only has eyes for her and proves that love is still in the Springfield air. Eventually, Marge changes her hair color back to blue to combat her jealousy issues and Homer dyes his hair blue for her.

== Reception ==
=== Viewing figures ===
In its original American broadcast, "The Blue and the Gray" was viewed by an estimated 5.618 million households and received a 2.7 rating/7 share among adults between the ages of 18 and 49. This episode marked a 10% drop from the previous episode, "Homer the Father." This might have been due to the episode airing against the 53rd Grammy Awards.

=== Critical response ===
Eric Hochberger of TV Fanatic called the episode "funny" but "unmemorable."

Rowan Kaiser of The A.V. Club gave the episode a B+. She called the episode solid and amusing. She highlighted the scene where the Simpson children try to figure out where their heads end and their hair begins.

=== Awards and nominations ===
Rob LaZebnik was nominated for a Writers Guild of America Award for Outstanding Writing in Animation at the 64th Writers Guild of America Awards for his script to this episode.
