= Lisa Simpson, This Isn't Your Life =

- The Simpsons episode
- Episode no.: Season 22; Episode 5
- Directed by: Matthew Nastuk
- Written by: Joel H. Cohen
- Production code: MABF20
- Original air date: November 14, 2010

Episode features
- Couch gag: The Simpsons rush to and sit on the couch as normal. Daredevil Lance Murdock jumps his motorcycle over the family and crashes through the doorway into the backyard.

Episode chronology
← Previous "Treehouse of Horror XXI"	Next → "The Fool Monty"
- The Simpsons season 22

"Lisa Simpson, This Isn't Your Life" is the fifth episode of the twenty-second season of the American animated television series The Simpsons. It first aired on the Fox network in the United States on November 14, 2010. In this episode, when Lisa discovers that Marge was also a model student, she tries to find out where everything changed so that she doesn't repeat her mistakes. Meanwhile, a series of chance accidents cause Bart to replace Nelson as school bully.

The episode was directed by Matthew Nastuk and written by Joel H. Cohen.

The episode received generally positive reviews from critics, with most citing it as the best of a mediocre season.

== Plot ==
Learning Maggie is upset about missing one of the collectible Happy Little Elves on the last day of a promotional giveaway, Homer drives the family to a gas station responsible for the giveaway. Homer continually buys gas to try and win the rare "Baby Must Have" toy. After failing, they drive through the district where Marge grew up. While visiting her mom's old house, Lisa discovers that Marge was an honor roll student. Lisa asks Principal Skinner who confirms that Marge was intelligent, but this has not prevented her from becoming a stay-at-home mother. Skinner warns that she will likely have the same future because Skinner knows that children often have the same fate of their parents. Meanwhile, during a stunt through the school playground, Bart gets mud all over Nelson. When Nelson goes to punch him, Bart slips and inadvertently kicks Nelson in the face, leading the other kids to view Bart as the new school bully.

Lisa discovers that Marge's grades plummeted after she met Homer and aims not to get distracted. She clears her room of everything that might take her attentions from her goals, including her saxophone. Marge discovers Lisa wants to be nothing like her and becomes unfriendly towards her. At school, Nelson confronts Bart at the tetherball pole, and takes a swing at him. Nelson misses and strikes the ball, which comes around and hits him by mistake. Another similar incident occurs in the hall where Nelson walks into a locker and gets trapped inside.

Lisa learns about Cloisters Academy, a prestigious school, and tries to persuade her parents to let her go there. Marge is against it, saying it is too expensive. After the principal and Marge discuss Lisa's record, she is offered a scholarship there. Taking advice from Marge, Bart stops Nelson from attacking him by making Nelson feel good about himself, and Nelson ends their dispute. Lisa discovers that she was not offered a scholarship; she was accepted because Marge agrees to do the school's laundry. Even worse, Marge has become an overworked drudge as a result. Lisa tells Marge she does not want to go to Cloisters anymore, saying it is "too elitist," and would be honored to be like her mother. However, she avoids showing Marge a guilty look that she has. Meanwhile, Homer steals a "Baby Must Have" from the gas station to keep Maggie happy.

== Cultural references ==
In May 2021, the scene with Homer filling his car trunk with gasoline was reported as predicting the panic buying that occurred in the wake of the Colonial Pipeline ransomware attack in the United States. However, this report was debunked because the circumstances were different. The same scene was also used as claims of predicting petrol shortages in the United Kingdom in September 2021.

== Reception ==
In its original American broadcast, "Lisa Simpson, This Isn't Your Life" was viewed by 8.97 million households receiving a 3.9 rating and a 10 share of the audience among adults between the ages of 18 and 49 coming second in its timeslot after NBC Sunday Night Football. It was the thirteenth most viewed show of the week amongst adults 18-49.

The episode received favorable reviews, with most citing it as one of the seasons best.

Emily VanDerWerff of The A.V. Club gave the episode a positive review calling it the "best episode of the season so far this week." and felt that "having her directly turn those feelings of inadequacy back on her mother was a nice turn, and the story made good use of the Marge and Lisa relationship as its emotional core," rating the episode with a B+.

Eric Hochberger of TV Fanatic gave the episode 4 out of 5 stars, saying the episode was "the strongest of a fairly decent season of The Simpsons."
