= Fat Tony (The Simpsons) =

Fictional character from The Simpsons franchise

Fat Tony/Fit-Fat Tony
- The Simpsons character
- First appearance: Fat Tony: "Bart the Murderer" (1991); Fit-Fat Tony: "Donnie Fatso" (2010)
- Last appearance: Fat Tony: "Donnie Fatso" (2010)
- Created by: Fat Tony: John Swartzwelder; Fit-Fat Tony: Chris Cluess
- Designed by: Matt Groening
- Voiced by: Joe Mantegna; Fat Tony: Hank Azaria ("A Fish Called Selma")

In-universe information
- Full name: Marion Anthony D'Amico (Fat Tony); Anthony Paul D'Amico (Fit-Fat Tony)
- Gender: Male
- Occupation: “Legitimate Businessman” (Underboss of the D'Amico crime family)
- Relatives: Fat Tony: Anna Maria D'Amico (wife, deceased); Michael D'Amico (son); Fit Tony (cousin); Sandra (cousin-in-law); Fit-Fat Tony: Sandra (wife); Fat Tony (cousin); Michael D'Amico (first cousin once removed); Selma Bouvier (goomar, separated); Anna Maria D'Amico (cousin-in-law, deceased)

Don Marion Anthony "Fat Tony" D'Amico is the name of two recurring characters in the animated sitcom The Simpsons. Both are voiced by Joe Mantegna and first appeared in the episode "Bart the Murderer" of the third season. Fat Tony is a mobster and the underboss of the Springfield Mafia. His henchmen include Legs, Louie, and Johnny Tightlips, and he reports to Don Vittorio DiMaggio. Upon the death of the original Fat Tony in the episode "Donnie Fatso" of the twenty-second season, the character's near-identical cousin of the same name is introduced. The characters somewhat resemble real-life mobster Anthony "Fat Tony" Salerno.

== Profile ==
=== First Fat Tony ===
The original Fat Tony, full name Marion Anthony D'Amico, was the chief racketeer behind several of Springfield's criminal enterprises, covering a wide range of rackets which included illegal gambling, cigarette smuggling, bootlegging, fraud, and making and selling fake IDs. In "The Twisted World of Marge Simpson", Homer contracts with the mafia to drive out Marge's rival snack food distributors. Fat Tony took out a hit on Mayor Quimby in "Mayored to the Mob" in retaliation for a raid on their rat milk facility, which Quimby opposed, as they had promised him "dog or higher". Fat Tony puts out a contract on Homer after his private security business interferes with the mob's interests in "Poppa's Got a Brand New Badge". Homer would have been executed gangland-style if not for Maggie coming to the rescue with her rifle. Fat Tony's son Michael is first mentioned by Fat Tony as he is talking to Marge in "The Seven-Beer Snitch", saying she drove him home from school sometimes. He is then properly introduced in the episode "The Mook, the Chef, the Wife and Her Homer". The episode also reveals that Fat Tony's wife "was whacked by 'natural causes'." Fat Tony and his associates meet in what is known as the "Legitimate Businessman's Social Club". Fat Tony played the violin in "Insane Clown Poppy".

=== Second Fat Tony ===
The original Fat Tony dies in the twenty-second season episode "Donnie Fatso" from a heart attack, with his final words to Homer being "I loved you man." Shortly afterwards, he is replaced by his slimmer cousin Anthony Paul D'Amico, initially nicknamed "Fit Tony". (Note: The second Fat Tony's full name was revealed in the episode "Whistler's Father.") By the end of that episode, Tony has taken to stress eating as a way of dealing with the numerous attempts on his life, and the resulting weight gain causes a change of nickname to "Fit-Fat Tony" and eventually "Fat Tony", essentially restoring the status quo from before the first Fat Tony died. This iteration of Fat Tony, although similar in character to the original, does have notable differences in his appearance such as lighter skin, darker hair, and wearing a red polo shirt instead of a teal one. But, the show ignores this change and it so makes him uncanon technically.

In "The Real Housewives of Fat Tony", he supposedly marries Selma Bouvier, but the relationship falls apart when Selma discovers Tony only held a ceremony to make her his goomar as he is already married to another woman.

== Name ==
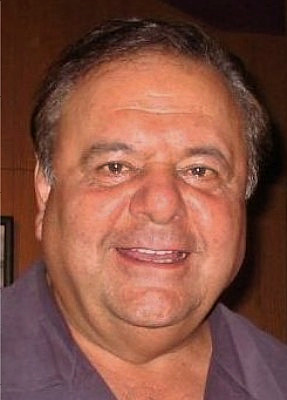
Fat Tony's visual appearance was modeled after actor Paul Sorvino.

The original Fat Tony's actual name is the source of some dispute, as several different real names have been revealed over the course of the series. In the third-season episode "Bart the Murderer", Fat Tony is referred to in a news report given by Kent Brockman as William "Fat Tony" Williams, presumably an alias. In the eighth-season episode "The Homer They Fall", the announcer at Homer's boxing match against Drederick Tatum refers to Fat Tony as Anthony D'Amico (incidentally the name of one of the three Re-Recording Mixers in the end credits), which he is called later as well, for example, by the FBI. In the twelfth-season episode "Insane Clown Poppy", Frankie the Squealer claims that Fat Tony's first name is Marion, a reference to actor John Wayne's real name, Marion Robert Morrison.

== Character ==
=== Development ===
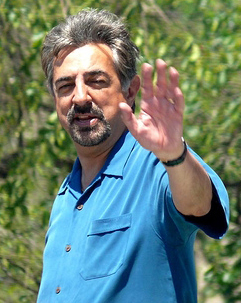
Joe Mantegna was cast as Fat Tony because Sheldon Leonard was unavailable.

Fat Tony first appeared in the third season episode "Bart the Murderer". The writers conceived the episode before the film Goodfellas, which has a similar plot, was released. However, when it was, the writers incorporated references to the film in the episode. Fat Tony was modeled on Paul Sorvino, who played mobster Paul Cicero in Goodfellas. The appearance of Louie, one of Tony's henchmen, was based on another Goodfellas actor, Frank Sivero. The end of the episode portrays a TV movie about the events depicted in the episode, in which Joe Mantegna will play Fat Tony (this was before it was decided that Fat Tony would be a recurring character). In the episode "Donnie Fatso", Fat Tony dies of a heart attack; his cousin Fit Tony takes his place as head of the syndicate, but soon becomes known as Fat Tony due to stress-induced overeating.

=== Voice ===
The writers originally wanted Sheldon Leonard to voice Fat Tony. When they were unable to get him, they cast Joe Mantegna. It is his longest-running role. Mantegna said, "You feel honored that they asked you to do a voice. The fact that they bring you back and keep writing for the character, it is very satisfying." Mantegna based his raspy voice for Fat Tony on his Uncle Willy, a long-standing cigarette smoker. He insists that the producers must "not let anyone else do his noises," even going so far as to say, "If Fat Tony sneezes, I want to be there." This is adhered to in the season 20 episode "Sex, Pies, and Idiot Scrapes, where the script required only grunting. Despite this, Hank Azaria voiced the character in the season 7 episode "A Fish Called Selma". Mantegna voiced Fat Tony in a scene in The Simpsons Movie that almost got cut. Of the Fat Tony episodes, Mantegna favors "Bart the Murderer" and "The Mook, the Chef, the Wife and Her Homer", because they are the character's first appearance and a season premiere.

== Reception ==
IGN ranked Fat Tony at No. 18 on their 2006 list of the "Top 25 Simpsons Peripheral Characters". Star News Online listed Joe Mantegna as one of the 400 reasons why they love The Simpsons. In 2007, Adam Finley of TV Squad called Mantegna one of the five best The Simpsons guest stars and Vanity Fair called "Bart the Murderer" the eighth best episode of the show, saying, "This episode makes the cut because of the inspired Mafia satire". Playmates Toys made Fat Tony into an action figure as part of the World of Springfield toy line.
