= Michael Paul Chan =

American actor

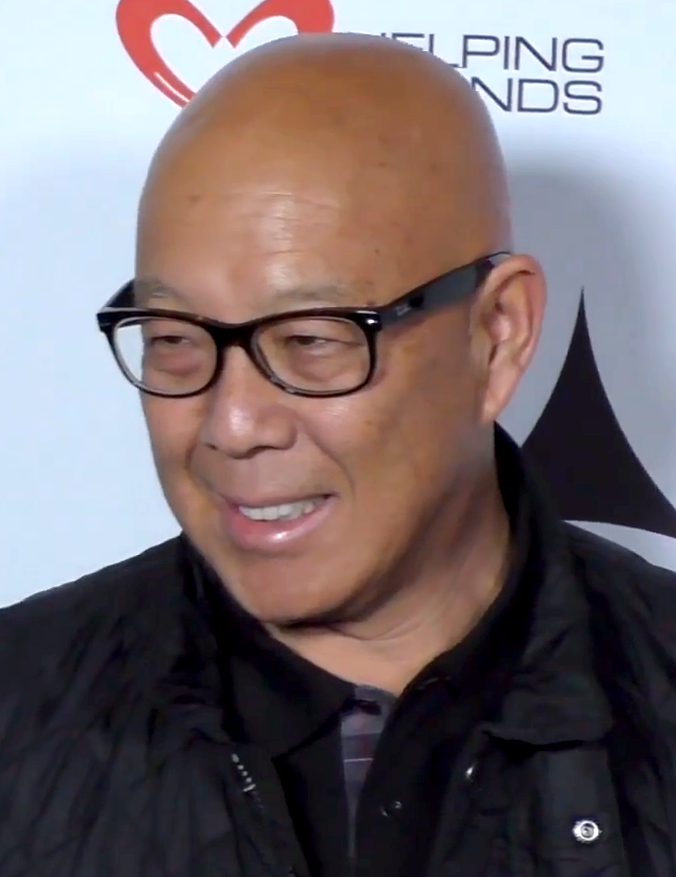
- Chan in 2016
- Born: June 26, 1950 (age 76); San Francisco, California, U.S.
- Education: San Francisco State University; American Conservatory Theater
- Occupation: Actor
- Years active: 1975–present

Michael Paul Chan (born June 26, 1950) is an American actor. He is known for his role as Lieutenant Michael Tao on the TNT series The Closer and Major Crimes. Chan also acted in U.S. Marshals, playing an assassin.

== Early life and education ==
A third-generation Chinese American, Chan was born in San Francisco, California. His brother was the late Jeffery Paul Chan, an author and academic.

Chan is a graduate of San Francisco State University and the American Conservatory Theater. He is a founding member of the Asian American Theater Company.

== Career ==
Chan's television work has included roles such as Judge Lionel Ping on Arrested Development, Detective Ron Lu on Robbery Homicide Division, the voice of Jimmy Ho on The PJ's, Mr. Chong on The Wonder Years, a Japanese investor in the 1990 Northern Exposure episode "Dreams, Schemes and Putting Greens", an agent of the Chinese Intelligence Agency on a 2011 episode of The Simpsons, and roles on Bones, Babylon 5, Nash Bridges, and The Young and the Restless.

One of Chan's more notable film roles was as the Korean convenience-store owner in the 1993 film Falling Down, where he refused to give a discount to Michael Douglas' character when he attempted to purchase a can of soda to get change for the pay telephone outside the store. Another was as Data's father in The Goonies. Chan appeared in both of Joel Schumacher's Batman movies, in two different roles - a Wayne Enterprises executive in Batman Forever, and Dr. Lee in Batman & Robin. Other films in his filmography include Americanese, Megiddo: The Omega Code 2, U.S. Marshals, Spy Game, The Protector, Quicksilver, The Joy Luck Club, The Insider, and Thief.

== Filmography ==
=== Film ===
Year	Title	Role	Notes/Ref.
1981	Thief	Chinese Waiter	
1984	Runaway	Security chief	
1985	The Goonies	Data's Father	
1986	Quicksilver	Asian Gangster	
1991	Thousand Pieces of Gold	Hong King	
1992	Rapid Fire	Carl Chang	
1993	The Joy Luck Club	Harold	
1993	Falling Down	Mr. Lee	
1993	Joshua Tree	Jimmy Shoeshine	
1994	Maverick	Riverboat Poker Player	
1995	Batman Forever	Wayne Enterprises Executive	
1995	Galaxis	Manny Hopkins	
1997	Batman & Robin	Observatory Scientist	
1997	The Protector	Anthony Mane	
1998	U.S. Marshals	Xiang Chen	
1999	The Insider	Norman	
2001	Megiddo: The Omega Code 2	Chinese Premier	
2001	Spy Game	Vincent Ngo	
2006	Americanese	Jimmy Chan	
2019	Boy Genius	Sam	
2024	Ba	Sonny	
2024	Between Borders	The Judge	

=== Television ===
Year	Title	Role	Notes/Ref.
1982	T. J. Hooker	Doctor	Episode: "The Connection"
1985	Hill Street Blues	Smith	Episode: "What Are Friends For"
1986	MacGyver	Banker	Episode: "The Wish Child"
1990	Northern Exposure	Masuto	Episode: "Dreams, Schemes and Putting Greens"
1992	The Wonder Years	Mr. Chong, Chinese Chef	3 episodes
1994	Babylon 5	Roberts	Episode: "The War Prayer"
1995	JAG	Ambassador Sonsiri	Episode: "Deja Vu"
1996	Profit	Alex Yee	Episode: "Hero"
1996	Nash Bridges	Tommy Luck	Episode: "Promised Land"
1999–2001	The PJs	Jimmy Ho (voice)	Main cast
2001	Static Shock	Mr. Kim (voice)	Episode: "Tantrum"
2002–03	Robbery Homicide Division	Ron Lu	Main cast
2004–05	Arrested Development	Lionel Ping	6 episodes
2005–12	The Closer	Mike Tao	Main cast
2007	Bones	Shi Jon Chen	Episode: "The Boneless Bride in the River"
2011	The Simpsons	Chinese Agent (voice)	Episode: "Homer the Father"
2012–18	Major Crimes	Mike Tao	Main cast
2019–21	The Resident	Yee Austin	Recurring role
2021	MacGyver	Dahn Nguyen	Episode: "Banh Bao + Sterno + Drill + Burner + Mason"
2023	Hello Tomorrow!	Walt	Recurring role
2024	Gremlins: The Wild Batch	The Lion (voice)	Episode: "Always Bring a Toothpick"
