= Homer the Father =

- The Simpsons episode
- Episode no.: Season 22; Episode 12
- Directed by: Mark Kirkland
- Written by: Joel H. Cohen
- Production code: NABF05
- Original air date: January 23, 2011

Guest appearances
- Michael Paul Chan as Chinese Agent; James Lipton as himself; David Mamet as himself; Garry Marshall as Sheldon Leavitt

Episode features
- Chalkboard gag: "Prince is not the son of Martin Luther King"
- Couch gag: Repeat of the couch gag from "The Squirt and the Whale."

Episode chronology
← Previous "Flaming Moe"	Next → "The Blue and the Gray"
- The Simpsons season 22

"Homer the Father" is the twelfth episode of the twenty-second season of the American animated television series The Simpsons. The episode was directed by Mark Kirkland and written by Joel H. Cohen. It originally aired on the Fox network in the United States on January 23, 2011.

In this episode, Bart attempts to trade nuclear secrets to China in exchange for a dirt bike when Homer refuses to give him one. Michael Paul Chan, James Lipton, writer David Mamet, and Garry Marshall guest starred. The episode received mixed reviews. Writer Joel H. Cohen won the Writers Guild of America Award for Television: Animation for this episode.

== Plot ==
Homer becomes obsessed with a 1980s family sitcom called Thicker Than Waters and starts acting like the show's father. Emulating this character's values, he refuses to give Bart a mini-bike he wants, because Bart would never learn to appreciate things if they come to him too easily.

Bart then realizes that he could sell secrets about the Springfield Nuclear Power Plant to other countries. He agrees to sell them to China in exchange for a mini-bike. To gain access to the nuclear plant's computer system, Bart begins doing typical father-son activities with Homer, eventually leading to Homer bringing Bart to work. When Homer falls asleep, Bart goes around the plant downloading information onto a USB storage device.

After Bart leaves the flashdrive with the downloaded data at the zoo and takes the bike, Homer reveals to him that he has bought him a mini-bike for being such a good child. Bart, feeling bad for betraying his country and his father, rushes back to the zoo in an attempt to recover the flashdrive. There, he meets the Chinese agents, who threaten to kill him if he does not cooperate. Homer steps in and offers himself in Bart's place, as he has a lifetime of nuclear experience. In China, he leads the construction of a nuclear power plant, which explodes right after the grand opening ceremony. Outside his hotel, he refuses to move out of the way of a taxi that would not take him to the airport for less than $20 in a reference to the photograph of a protester standing in front of a line of tanks during the 1989 Tiananmen Square protests. Back at the house, Bart tells Homer how much he appreciates him, and that they have "the best kind of bonding": sitting in front of the television while making no eye contact at all. A James Lipton-hosted cast retrospective on "Thicker Than Waters" reveals everyone on the show was screwed up and hated working together for that long.

== Production ==
In December 2010, Entertainment Weekly reported that writer David Mamet would guest star as himself. He would appear as a writer on the fictional television series Thicker Than Waters who is inspired to write expletives from one of its actors. Executive producer Al Jean said it was an honor and that the Simpsons character Gil Gunderson was based on Jack Lemmon's character from the 1992 film Glengarry Glen Ross, which was written by Mamet. Michael Paul Chan guest starred as a Chinese agent. Writer and television host James Lipton appeared as himself. Lipton previously appeared as himself in the thirteenth season episode "The Sweetest Apu."

== Reception ==
=== Viewing figures ===
In its original American broadcast, "Homer the Father" was viewed by an estimated 6.5 million households with a 3.1 rating/7 share among adults between the ages of 18 and 49. The number of viewers increased slightly from the previous week and the 18-49 demographic stayed steady, in spite of going up against the hugely viewed AFC Championship. In Canada, the episode was watched by 962,000 viewers.

=== Critical response ===
TV Fanatic gave the episode a 3.8 out of 5, stating, "This week's installment was loaded with plenty of hilarious meta jokes about the television industry, thanks to its storyline about Homer mimicking his favorite '80s sitcom father, who seemed to be a mishmash of every fictional patriarch from that decade."

Rowan Kaiser of The A.V. Club gave the episode a C+. Kaiser thought the premise was straightforward until it was derailed in the end with Homer building a nuclear plant that explodes.

=== Awards and nominations ===
Joel H. Cohen won the Writers Guild of America Award for Outstanding Writing in Animation at the 64th Writers Guild of America Awards for his script to this episode.
