= The Fool Monty =

- The Simpsons episode
- Episode no.: Season 22; Episode 6
- Directed by: Steven Dean Moore
- Written by: Michael Price
- Production code: NABF01
- Original air date: November 21, 2010

Guest appearance
- Terry W. Greene as Sgt. Activity

Episode features
- Couch gag: In an homage to James Cameron's Avatar, the Simpsons are transferred into Na'vi bodies. Na'vi Bart tames a wild flying couch before the family sits down in front of the TV wearing blue/red 3D glasses.

Episode chronology
← Previous "Lisa Simpson, This Isn't Your Life"	Next → "How Munched Is That Birdie in the Window?"
- The Simpsons season 22

"The Fool Monty" is the sixth episode of the twenty-second season of the American animated television series The Simpsons. It originally aired on the Fox network in the United States on November 21, 2010. In the episode, Bart finds Mr. Burns lying in the forest and takes him home, while Homer decides to get revenge. It was directed by Steven Dean Moore and written by Michael Price.

The episode received mixed reviews. It also featured a controversy when a joke about Fox News started a brief feud with political commentator Bill O'Reilly.

== Plot ==
A group of TV representatives plan to cause mass panic to increase ratings by fabricating a faux disease caused by household cats and state, among other things, that there is a vaccine available in limited supply. At the Springfield hospital, Mr. Burns steals a significant portion of the vaccine for himself, claiming that he needs to give a good example to his hounds (even though dogs are immune to the disease) and running over the rest of the vaccine with his car in the process, causing immense anger to Springfield.

After Burns learns from his doctor that he is suffering from multiple fatal illnesses and has only six weeks to live, he becomes distraught at his fate; when he tells the news to the rest of the town, however, they celebrate and proceed to melt his ice sculpture. Realizing that no one in Springfield (aside from Smithers) likes him, Burns attempts suicide by leaping from a cliff, but ends up surviving, albeit with some amnesia and delusional behavior. Bart finds a helpless Burns in the wilderness and secretly takes him into the Simpsons' home. When Homer and Marge learn about their new house guest, they, along with the rest of Springfield, decide to get some payback for all the misery he has caused them over the years. However, they eventually get tired of tormenting him and cast him aside.

When Lisa takes Burns back to his mansion, he regains his memory. Once again a cruel, heartless miser, he decides to put a dome over the town to get revenge on everyone who had treated him badly (inspired by Stephen King's novel Under the Dome), only to be informed that something similar was already done and it would not work again because they could simply dig their way out (though Officer Lou wonders why they didn’t do it the first time). Marge tries to convince Burns that he should treat people with more respect after this experience, but her argument fails when Burns realizes that his cruelty is the only thing that has kept him alive for some time, as he has survived the past six weeks.

In the end, Burns flies away in his helicopter piloted by Smithers, who spent a brief time working for former Vice President Dick Cheney during Burns' assumed demise. The two are immediately greeted by Nelson, who threatens to crash the helicopter unless Burns agrees to attend a school version of Who's Afraid of Virginia Woolf? posing as Nelson's father. Despite his disgust at being forced to watch the play, Burns actually enjoys Nelson's performance.

== Cultural references ==
The episode's couch gag serves as a parody of the 2009 film Avatar. Mr Burns is inspired by Stephen King's Under the Dome to place a large dome over Springfield before being told by Lenny that it has already been done, in a reference to The Simpsons Movie. Bart hides Mr. Burns among his stuffed animals like in the film E.T. the Extra-Terrestrial and one of the toys is an E.T. doll. The episode title is a reference to the title of the 1997 film The Full Monty.

In March 2020, a modified clip from this episode was combined with clips from the fourth season episode "Marge in Chains" to show that the show predicted the COVID-19 pandemic. However, it was shown that the clip from this episode was changed with the phrase "CORONA VIRUS" written over the original text of "Apocalypse Meow." Bill Oakley, who co-wrote the 1993 episode, commented on the prediction saying that since history repeats itself, it only seems like the show is predicting things.

== Reception ==
In its original American broadcast, "The Fool Monty" was viewed by an estimated 6.63 million viewers and received a 2.9 rating/7 share among adults between the ages of 18 and 49.

Emily VanDerWerff of The A.V. Club called the episode "recycled" and stated "I generally liked the first act of this, with the very funny bit where the networks conspire to create a housecat flu panic and the gags about waiting in line for the vaccine but the rest of the episode very slowly deflated." She rated the episode with a C+.

Eric Hochberger of TV Fanatic gave the episode 3.5 out of 5 stars. He thought the beginning of the episode with the fake epidemic for television ratings was unique before shifting to another episode about Mr. Burns.

=== Controversy ===
Near the beginning of the episode, a Fox News helicopter can be seen, with the slogan "Fox News: Not Racist, But #1 With Racists." Bill O'Reilly, host of the Fox News show The O'Reilly Factor, aired the clip during the show's "Pinheads and Patriots" segment, saying "Continuing to bite the hand that feeds part of it, Fox broadcasting once again allows its cartoon characters to run wild." After the clip aired, he said "Pinheads? I believe so." Republican Vice President Cheney is also lampooned throughout the episode.

In response, the producers added a brief scene at the beginning of the opening sequence of the following episode with a helicopter that bears the slogan "Fox News: Unsuitable for Viewers Under 75." According to showrunner Al Jean, the producers of the show were pleased that they had annoyed O'Reilly, and that they had never received a warning from Fox about making jokes about the network. He added, "Both ends of it benefit the ultimate News Corp. agenda," Jean said. "We're happy to have a little feud with Bill O'Reilly. That's a very entertaining thing for us."
