= How Munched Is That Birdie in the Window? =

- The Simpsons episode
- Episode no.: Season 22; Episode 7
- Directed by: Mike Frank Polcino
- Written by: Kevin Curran
- Production code: NABF02
- Original air date: November 28, 2010

Guest appearances
- Danica Patrick as herself; Marcia Wallace as Edna Krabappel; Rachel Weisz as Dr. Thurston; Gregg Berger as various animals

Episode features
- Chalkboard gag: ""A Charlie Brown Thanksgiving" is as good as "A Charlie Brown Christmas""
- Couch gag: After getting shrunk by Professor Frink, the tiny family tries to rush to the couch, only for them to get chased by Snowball II into a mouse hole and get stuck in a mouse trap.

Episode chronology
← Previous "The Fool Monty"	Next → "The Fight Before Christmas"
- The Simpsons season 22

"How Munched Is That Birdie in the Window?" is the seventh episode of the twenty-second season of the American animated television series The Simpsons. The episode was directed by Mike Frank Polcino and written by Kevin Curran. It originally aired on the Fox network in the United States on November 28, 2010.

In this episode, Bart refuses to forgive Santa's Little Helper after he eats a bird that Bart nursed back to health. Race car driver Danica Patrick and Rachel Weisz guest starred. The episode received mixed reviews.

The title of the episode is a reference to the 1952 song "(How Much Is) That Doggie in the Window?."

== Plot ==
During a thunderstorm (literally caused by angels bowling), Homer tells a scary story to his children, and a homing pigeon named Raymond Bird by his owner flies through Bart's window and breaks his wing. Unable to give him back to his owner (due to his laziness to get it back), Lisa reveals that she has ornithophobia so it is up to Bart to nurse the bird back to health with her instructions. As the bird regains his health, Bart bonds with Raymond. He finds out that the pigeon can be used to send messages between people, which leads everybody to enjoy their time with the pigeon, minus a disgusted Lisa (the only time that she even tries to get contact with the pigeon only reinforces her phobia, since Raymond regurgitates on Lisa's arm). The exhausted bird, however, gets eaten by Santa's Little Helper, and Homer and Bart's attempt to retrieve Raymond from Helper's mouth backfires when the little bird falls back into the dog's mouth and slips into his stomach twice, (the first time where Bart tries to get the bird out) where he's instantly digested.

After a symbolic funeral, Bart (who even cries) has a hard time coping with the loss and becomes so irritated at Santa's Little Helper that he starts to act coldly towards him, leaving Homer and Marge worried as they are aware that Bart has trouble forgiving people even for the smallest offense (evident by the fact that he still had not forgiven Milhouse for breaking his toy car, believing it to be a Transformer). When they take him to a therapy session with Dr. Thurston (voiced by guest star Rachel Weisz), she tries to convince Bart that Santa's Little Helper is an innocent creature who never had the intention to hurt him and that Bart should forgive him. When this fails (thanks in no small part to Helper's taste for birds) she advises the Simpsons that the only cure for Bart’s blues is to give away the family dog, leaving Lisa miffed at Bart for forcing them to abandon their beloved pet. They take him to an ostrich farm up state. Bart bids a tearful goodbye to Santa's Little Helper and tells him to never kill a bird. Homer manages to get into a fight with an angry and sociopathical ostrich which then turns on Bart.

After being told that it is wrong to kill birds, Santa's Little Helper ceases to aid Bart in the fight, confused at his own loyalty (for Bart's sake or his orders) leaving Bart to strangle the ostrich to near-death in exactly the same manner Homer strangles him (leaving Homer proud of his son). Bart then realizes that Santa's Little Helper could not help what he did and apologizes for holding such a grudge against him. The family goes back home with the dog and the ostrich Bart strangled tied to the car, but the ostrich regains consciousness and punches through the roof with its claw, proceeding to strangle Homer.

== Production ==
=== Development ===
Near the beginning of previous episode, a Fox News helicopter can be seen with the slogan "Fox News: Not Racist, But #1 With Racists." Bill O'Reilly, host of the Fox News show The O'Reilly Factor, publicly denounced his employer by saying "Continuing to bite the hand that feeds part of it, Fox broadcasting once again allows its cartoon characters to run wild."

In response, the producers added a brief scene at the beginning of the opening sequence of the episode with a helicopter that bears the slogan "Fox News: Unsuitable for Viewers Under 75." According to executive producer Al Jean, the producers of the show were pleased that they had annoyed O'Reilly, and that they had never received a warning from Fox about making jokes about the network. He added, "Both ends of it benefit the ultimate News Corp. agenda," Jean said. "We're happy to have a little feud with Bill O'Reilly. That's a very entertaining thing for us."

Because of the lateness of the production process, this scene was only available for the North American broadcast. International broadcasts and internet viewings showed the depiction of Homer as King Kong. Jean stated that the incident helped teach the show creators how to generate more topical content when an episode can take at least one year to produce.

=== Casting ===
Race car driver Danica Patrick had a cameo as herself. Rachel Weisz played a therapist helping Bart and Santa's Little Helper.

== Reception ==
In its original American broadcast, "How Munched Is That Birdie in the Window" was viewed by an estimated 9.42 million households with 4.1 rating/10 share among adults between the ages of 18 and 49, making it the highest rated scripted program for Fox the night it aired. The episode also received a 41% rise from the previous episode, "The Fool Monty."

Rowan Kaiser of The A.V. Club gave the episode a B−, commenting, "It's an especially bad idea to focus on the plot of this Simpsons episode, because most of its joy comes from its visuals. More than most episodes, 'How Munched Is That Birdie In The Window?' relies on sight gags or extended bits of dialogue-free comedy." He praised the cameo by Danica Patrick, but criticized Rachel Weisz's role, saying that "[she] is ill-used as a therapist who supposedly tries to get Bart and Santa's Little Helper to like each other again."

Eric Hochberger of TV Fanatic gave the episode 3 out of 5 stars. He thought the episode was full of jokes before fading in the third act.
