= The Man Who Flew Too Much =

- The Simpsons episode
- Episode no.: Season 36; Episode 10
- Directed by: Steven Dean Moore
- Written by: Al Jean
- Production code: 36ABF02
- Original air date: December 22, 2024

Guest appearance
- Glenn Close as Mona Simpson

Episode features
- Couch gag: The Springfield social media account posts "Family runs in. Couch is Ferris wheel seat." and "Wait we did this one. #LAZY".

Episode chronology
← Previous "O C'mon All Ye Faithful"	Next → "Bottle Episode"
- The Simpsons season 36

"The Man Who Flew Too Much" is the tenth episode of the thirty-sixth season of the American animated television series The Simpsons, and the 780th episode overall. It aired in the United States on Fox on December 22, 2024. The episode was written by Al Jean and directed by Steven Dean Moore.

In this episode, the helicopter taking Homer's bowling team to a championship match crashes on a snowy mountain, and the survivors must find a way to return to Springfield. Glenn Close guest starred as Mona Simpson. The episode received mixed reviews.

== Plot ==
The current iteration of the Pin Pals bowling team, consisting of team captain Homer, Moe, Ned, Carl, and a new character named Fausto, have made it to the state championship match. The town holds a rally for the team where the team members make speeches. Ned says a prayer thanking God while Homer taunts him. Bart says he is proud of Homer. Barney flies the team to the tournament in his helicopter. As they attempt to fly over a snowy mountain, they are alerted that the helicopter is overweight because the team brought heavier bowling balls than the ones declared in the flight manifest. Unable to climb over the mountain, Barney tries to land, but the helicopter crashes.

The survivors are uninjured except for Fausto, who is unconscious and barely breathing. They trek down the mountain with Flanders carrying Fausto while Homer secretly admires his effort. Moe gets a phone call from Bart, looking for Homer, and throws away his phone thinking it is a prank call. They begin hallucinating and start to pray. Barney checks on Fausto and says he has died. Moe suggests eating Fausto, but Ned stops him while secretly eating the communion wafers he carries with him. Homer tells Ned he is a better leader than him, but Ned encourages Homer and has him lead the team in prayer. However, they quickly lose consciousness due to the cold.

Meanwhile, no one in town can contact the team, and everyone aside from the Simpsons assumes they have died. Marge puts up the Christmas decorations at home to make the family feel better even though it is October. The police tell Marge to prepare for the worst while Patty and Selma use generative artificial intelligence to show her Homer's dead body. However, Marge believes he is alive and will lead the team to safety. She prepares Homer's favorite foods for when he returns.

On the mountain, Homer hallucinates his mother and asks to join her in heaven. She says she is not there, which worries him. He smells Marge's cooking, and he awakens. Homer ties the living team members to a rope and drags them down the mountain while leaving Fausto behind.

As the town holds the funeral for the team overseen by Reverend Lovejoy, they burst into the church to the elation of the Simpson family. They are proud that Homer saved the team and proved everyone wrong.

During the credits, Reverend Lovejoy is sweeping inside the church as Fausto appears declaring that he is alive.

== Production ==
The plot of the Pin Pals trying to survive the crash is a parody of the 1993 film Alive and the 2023 film Society of the Snow. The films depict how the survivors of Uruguayan Air Force Flight 571 stayed alive by resorting to cannibalism, which Moe considers in the episode. Writer Al Jean was not aware that the plot of the television series Yellowjackets has a similar premise until after he pitched the episode.

Glenn Close reprised her role as Mona Simpson. Close first appeared in this role in the seventh season episode "Mother Simpson". In this episode, Chris Edgerly takes over the role of Rod Flanders from Pamela Hayden, who retired earlier in the season. Milhouse Van Houten, previously voiced by Hayden, appears but is not voiced.

== Cultural references ==
The couch gag of this episode references the Out of Context Simpsons Couch Gags account (@OOCCouchGags) on X. The depiction of Homer rising and pushing away the snow is based on a similar illustration in the comic book The Amazing Spider-Man #33.

== Reception ==
=== Viewing figures ===
The episode earned a 0.26 rating and was watched by 0.91 million viewers, which was the second-most watched show on Fox that night, behind a repeat of Bob's Burgers.

=== Critical response ===
John Schwarz of Bubbleblabber gave the episode a 7.5 out of 10. He preferred the original Pin Pals team but liked the sight gags and Bart's phone call to Moe. He also did not like the Fausto character and the brief appearance by Mona. Mike Celestino of Laughing Place did not like the jokes or the writing. He would have preferred a follow-up episode of the seventh season episode "Team Homer", which was the first episode to feature the Pin Pals.

Cathal Gunning of Screen Rant gave the episode a 9 out of 10. He noted the plot's similarity to the events of Flight 571 and its films, and felt that "The Simpsons story justifies its macabre inspiration, no matter how unexpected the source material may be." Nick Valdez of Comicbook.com ranked the episode 15th on his list of the season's best episodes. He called it an experimental episode that doesn't quite work and also said bringing Mona back was a "strange decision." He concluded, "It's a solid story for the episode, but not everything comes together as well as it has in other episodes this season."
