= Bart the Mother =

- The Simpsons episode
- Episode no.: Season 10; Episode 3
- Directed by: Steven Dean Moore
- Written by: David X. Cohen
- Production code: 5F22
- Original air date: September 27, 1998

Guest appearance
- Phil Hartman as Troy McClure

Episode features
- Couch gag: Two firemen hold the couch as if it were a safety net. Marge, Bart, Lisa and Maggie land safely on the couch; meanwhile, Homer falls through the floor.
- Commentary: Matt Groening; Mike Scully; George Meyer; Ron Hauge; David X. Cohen; Steven Dean Moore

Episode chronology
← Previous "The Wizard of Evergreen Terrace"	Next → "Treehouse of Horror IX"
- The Simpsons season 10

"Bart the Mother" is the third episode of the tenth season of the American animated television series The Simpsons. It originally aired on Fox in the United States on September 27, 1998. In the episode, Bart accidentally kills a mother bird with a BB gun, and decides to hatch and take care of the two eggs he found in the bird's nest.

"Bart the Mother" was written by David X. Cohen and directed by Steven Dean Moore; it was the last full-length episode Cohen wrote for The Simpsons before leaving to work on Futurama. The original idea for the episode was intended to be a B story, but because it was too difficult to work into other episodes, it eventually became a primary plot. The episode features the final speaking appearance of character Troy McClure and was dedicated to the character's voice actor, Phil Hartman, who was murdered by his wife on May 28, 1998, four months before the episode aired.

In its original American broadcast, "Bart the Mother" finished 58th in ratings for the week of September 21–27, 1998, with a Nielsen rating of 7.4, translating to 7,355,600 households.

The episode received generally positive reviews from critics, who praised Bart's moral dilemma and soul searching moments. Nancy Cartwright, the voice actress of Bart, described the episode as one of her favorites.

== Plot ==
When Marge takes the family to the Family Fun Center, she notices Nelson intentionally knocking Milhouse off a racetrack and winning a BB gun from stolen prize tickets. Bart and Nelson attempt to be friends but Marge forbids Bart to be with Nelson. Bart goes to his house anyway to use his BB gun. When Nelson pressures Bart to shoot a bird in a nest, Bart attempts to deliberately miss and winds up accidentally killing it. Marge learns where he went, goes to Nelson's house and is furious after seeing what he did but instead of punishing him, she refuses to have anything to do with his destructive ways and leaves. Bart discovers two eggs in the bird's nest and not wanting the babies to die too, decides to hatch them, secretly keeping the eggs warm in his treehouse. Marge gets suspicious after noticing him spending more time in his treehouse but forgives him after finding out what he has been doing. With Marge's help, the eggs eventually hatch but the Simpson family is shocked when a pair of lizards emerge from them, whom Bart had already named Chirpy Boy and Bart Jr.

Bart and Marge take the lizards to the Springfield Birdwatching Society, where Principal Skinner explains they are Bolivian tree lizards, a breed that steals a bird's eggs and leaves their own to be watched after by the mother bird, which is then eaten by the offspring once they hatch. As Skinner wonders how their mother ended up in Springfield, a nervous Apu secretly remembers that a pair of the lizards had come with his shipment of Bolivian donuts and escaped his store while he was putting them on the shelf. Skinner says the lizards must be killed by law because they have killed many bird species. Bart escapes and runs away with the lizards, but Skinner catches up to him and they struggle on top of the society building. The lizards fall off the side but to everyone's disbelief (except Skinner's), glide to the ground. The lizards grow in population and start to eradicate pigeons in Springfield. Since the town considered the pigeons a nuisance, they are delighted and Bart is thanked and honored by Mayor Quimby with a loganberry scented candle. Lisa worries the town will become infested by lizards but Skinner assures her they will send in Chinese needle snakes to eat them, followed by snake-eating gorillas, which will "simply freeze to death" when wintertime rolls around. Lisa questions why Bart was upset when he killed just one bird, but was at ease with indirectly killing thousands, but their train of thought is disrupted when they fight over who gets to ride in the front seat on the ride home.

== Production ==
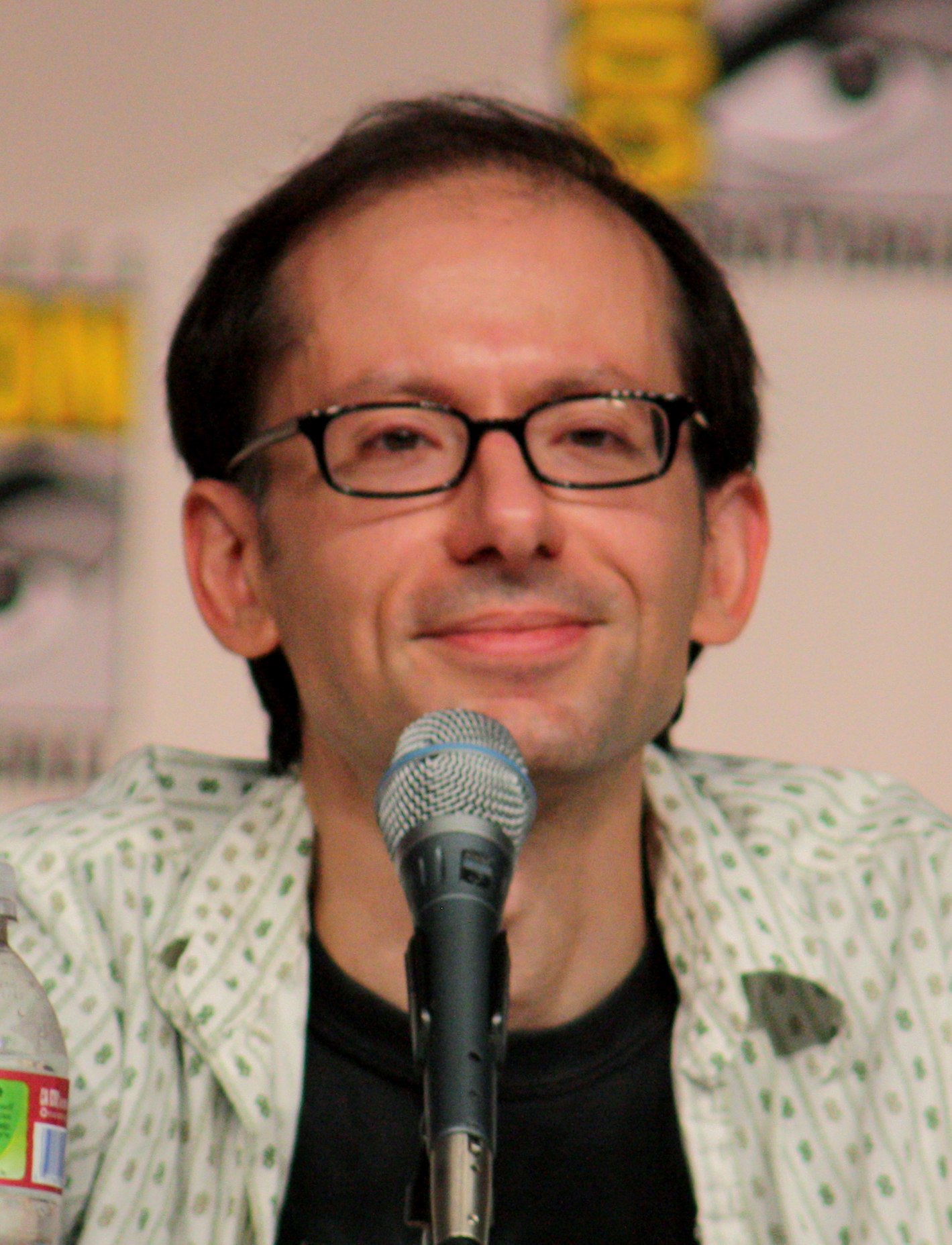
"Bart the Mother" was the last full-length episode David X. Cohen wrote for The Simpsons before he left to work on Futurama.

"Bart the Mother" was the last full-length episode David X. Cohen wrote for The Simpsons. Shortly after the episode aired, Cohen teamed up with The Simpsons' creator Matt Groening to develop Futurama, where he served as executive producer and head writer for the series' entire run. Cohen's idea for the episode started out as a B story for Homer. In the original concept, pigeons nest outside Homer's window at the Springfield Nuclear Power Plant. Mr. Burns exterminates the pigeons and Homer climbs out onto the ledge of the window, in the middle of a blizzard, to nest the eggs. Cohen said the idea "[did not] fit in anywhere", so he decided to pitch it as an A story instead, with Bart nesting the eggs instead of Homer, making this episode one of the few season 10 episodes where Homer has a minor role. The Simpsons writer George Meyer thought the idea of Bart shooting the bird and simply nesting the eggs was too straightforward, and he did not think it had "enough of a twist" to be a good episode. Cohen and Meyer eventually decided the eggs should be lizard eggs. Cohen thought the twist was what ultimately made the episode both "touching" and "interesting".

Producer Ron Hauge came up with the idea of someone shooting a bird and feeling guilty about it. Hauge told the staff a few weeks before Cohen started writing the episode that when he was 13 or 14 years old, he accidentally killed a bird after he got a Wrist Rocket slingshot, and took a shot at a bird that he thought was "far, far away". Hauge said his friends were excited about it, but he was "dying inside". For the scene in which the bird is killed, Cohen received further inspiration from an episode of The Andy Griffith Show entitled "Opie the Birdman". The writers were trying to figure out a way to have Bart kill the bird without actually wanting to kill it, and decided to give the gun a crooked sight that Bart would be unaware of, so when Bart intentionally takes a shot at the right of the bird to avoid it, the bullet still hits the bird. After Bart kills the mother bird, he imagines himself before a bird court with a vulture, an eagle, and a toucan as judges. This sequence was added to "liven up the visuals", because the writers thought the episode tended too heavily towards extreme realism and because most of the scenes in the episode were taking place in and around the Simpsons' house. Then-show runner Mike Scully had done the same thing with an episode he wrote for season seven called "Marge Be Not Proud". In that episode, Bart gets caught shoplifting, and writer Bill Oakley suggested the addition of a fantasy sequence to get away from the realism in the episode.

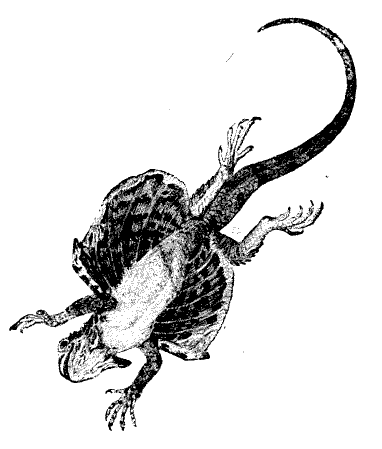
The gliding lizard genus Draco, seen here, served as inspiration for the Bolivian tree lizard in the episode.

The Family Fun Center the Simpsons visit is based on a real family fun center in Falmouth, Massachusetts that Cohen went to as a child to play video games. The Bolivian tree lizard is a fake species, but Cohen based it on real animals, including the dinosaur species Oviraptor, which was originally thought to eat eggs. The species is also based on the cowbird and the cuckoo, which lay their eggs in other birds' nests, and Draco, a genus of gliding lizards. Cohen also received inspiration from the cane toad that started "taking over" Australia in 1935.

"Bart the Mother" marked the last guest appearance of Phil Hartman on The Simpsons as Troy McClure. On May 28, 1998, four months before the episode aired, he was shot and killed by his wife Brynn. "Bart the Mother" was dedicated in his memory in response to this. Rather than replace Hartman with a new voice actor, the production staff retired McClure from the show, along with Hartman's other recurring character, Lionel Hutz.

== Reception ==
In its original American broadcast, "Bart the Mother" finished 58th in the ratings for the week of September 21–27, 1998, with a Nielsen rating of 7.4, translating to 7,355,600 households.

Nancy Cartwright, the voice of Bart Simpson, called it one of her favorite The Simpsons episodes, along with "Bart Sells His Soul" and "Lisa's Substitute".

The Toronto Sun's Bruce Kirkland wrote that "Bart the Mother" was one of the "classic episodes" of the series' tenth season.

The authors of the book I Can't Believe It's a Bigger and Better Updated Unofficial Simpsons Guide, Warren Martyn and Adrian Wood wrote, "We particularly like the moral dilemma at the end, as underlined by Lisa, regarding the eventual culling of the lizards that will need to take place. A good romp, this one, with some nice laughs at Homer's expense."

Colin Jacobson of DVD Movie Guide said, "The show generates decent heart as it shows Bart's attempts to make up for his misbehavior. The show becomes reasonably enjoyable if not especially memorable."

Jesse Hassenger of PopMatters named the tenth season of The Simpsons the series' "first significant dip in quality, a step away from its golden era [...] with broader gags and more outlandish plots". However, Hassenger enjoyed "Bart the Mother", and wrote, "[The episode] explores the show's sweet and dark sides simultaneously as Bart, remorseful after killing a bird, tries to care for orphaned eggs that turn out to hold ravenous lizards."

DVD Town's James Plath described "Bart the Mother" as an episode that viewers would either love or hate, because of Bart's rare moments of soul searching, and he found the episode to be a memorable one.
