= Religion in The Simpsons =

Religion as a theme in the American animated television series The Simpsons

Religion is one of many recurring themes on the American animated television series The Simpsons. Much of the series' religious humor satirizes aspects of Christianity and religion in general. However, some episodes, such as "Bart Sells His Soul" and "Alone Again, Natura-Diddily", can be interpreted as having a spiritual theme. The show has been both praised and criticized by atheists, agnostics, liberals, conservatives and religious people in general for its portrayal of faith and religion in society. The show can function as a mediator of biblical literacy among younger generations of irreligious viewers.

In the series, the Simpson family attends services led by Reverend Lovejoy. The church's denomination is identified as the "Western Branch of American Reform Presbylutheranism" in the episode "The Father, the Son, and the Holy Guest Star." This is generally interpreted as representing the multitude of American Protestant traditions in general and not one specific denomination.

== Analysis ==
Although The Simpsons often mocks religion, it has received support from some religious quarters. In a 2001 article for The Christian Century, John Dart argued that

"[T]he enormous popularity of The Simpsons, now in its 12th television season, suggests that religious people have a sense of humor — contrary to the usual wisdom in Hollywood. The program takes more satirical jabs at spiritual matters than any other TV show, yet the erratic cartoon family has an appreciative audience among many people of faith and among many analysts of religion. The reason? Perhaps it’s because The Simpsons is an equal-opportunity satire: it shrewdly targets all sorts of foibles and hypocrisies, not just religious ones. Perhaps it’s also because the show is exceptionally aware of the significant place religion has in the American landscape."

The February 5, 2001, edition of Billy Graham's Christianity Today, titled Saint Flanders, featured Ned Flanders, Homer, and Marge on the cover and described Flanders as "the most visible evangelical to many Americans." In one of the issue's articles, Dart argued, among other things, that "At home, the less devout are probably tuned to the competition, Touched by an Angel." In July 2007, Christianity Today film reviewer Russ Breimeier gave The Simpsons Movie a positive review, stating "Most television shows don't translate well to the big screen, and that's especially true for 15- or 30-minute cartoons that don't have the depth or nuance to expand into feature length. But The Simpsons, with its broad range of slapstick and satire, effortlessly stretches to four times the usual length of a 22-minute episode, yielding one of the most successful television-to-cinema transplants I've ever seen: "Best ... feature-length ... episode ... ever" and that "If you agree that The Simpsons has soured somewhat over the last five years, fear not. The Simpsons Movie reunites several of the veterans responsible for the golden age of the series, including creator Matt Groening, director David Silverman (Monsters, Inc.), and contributing writers James L. Brooks, Al Jean, John Swartzwelder, David Mirkin, Ian-Maxtone-Graham, among others—eleven writers, four consultants."

In December 2009, an article published in L'Osservatore Romano, the Holy See's official newspaper, praised The Simpsons for its "realistic" way of dealing with religion. "Homer finds in God his last refuge, even though he sometimes gets His name sensationally wrong. But these are just minor mistakes, after all; the two know each other well", the article said. The Simpson family is often seen attending church, a practice described by Dart as "rarely seen or mentioned in other TV shows." Simpsons creator Matt Groening has also stated that The Simpsons is one of the few shows on television where the family attends church regularly. The characters in the family are often seen praying. William Romanowski, author of the book Pop Culture Wars: Religion and the Role of Entertainment in American Life, noted that "The Simpsons is not dismissive of faith, but treats religion as an integral part of American life. Episodes that I’ve seen are not so much irreverent toward religion, but poke fun at American attitudes and practices."

One episode that heavily features religion is "Bart Sells His Soul" (1995). While discussing The Simpsons' treatment of religion in his Drawn to Television book, M. Keith Booker cites a scene from the episode where Milhouse asks Bart what religions have to gain by lying about concepts such as the existence of a soul – and then the scene cuts to Reverend Lovejoy counting his money. Booker believes that this implies that religions create mythologies so that they can gain money from followers. He juxtaposes this with Bart's realization later in the episode that "life suddenly feels empty and incomplete" without a soul, which suggests "either that the soul is real or it is at least a useful fiction". The episode has been used in church courses about the nature of a soul in Connecticut and in the United Kingdom, and was shown by a minister in Scotland in one of his sermons. A 2005 report on religious education in secondary schools by the UK education watchdog group Office for Standards in Education, Children's Services and Skills (Ofsted) noted that the episode was being used as a teaching tool.

As of 2017, more than 95% of The Simpsons episodes explicitly referenced religion. The show advocates ideas of religious pluralism and exploring spiritual beliefs independently, while it criticizes the use of religion and spirituality to avoid responsibility.

== Religions ==
Christians (but not Christianity itself) are heavily parodied by the show, and are often portrayed as failing to meet the standards set by the faith. The season 4 episode "Homer the Heretic" challenges the necessity of attending church in order to be a good Christian, exploring topics of religious individualism and religious certainty. The season 13 episode "She of Little Faith" criticizes churches that operate for profit rather than practicing Christian teachings. Ned Flanders is the show's archetype of an evangelical Christian. He is often used to portray evangelical Christianity in a negative light, with the show suggesting that he is not capable of thinking outside of his Biblical framework. In the season 12 episode "HOMR", he burns a document "proving" that God does not exist. In the season 17 episode "The Monkey Suit", he leads a movement to teach creationism in schools before being proved wrong in a trial that parodied the Scopes trial.

In the season 13 episode "She of Little Faith", Lisa Simpson converts to Buddhism after her church's consumerism causes her to lose faith. The episode portrays her adoption of Buddhism as spiritually fulfilling in contrast to her poor experience in church, and it serves as an example of how religion can accept consumerism without being overtaken by it.

Apu Nahasapeemapetilon is the most significant Hindu character on The Simpsons. He keeps a shrine to Ganesha in his store, the Kwik-E-Mart.

In the season 3 episode "Like Father, Like Clown", it is revealed that Krusty the Clown is Jewish and has had a strained relationship with his father due to differing career plans. At the end, Bart and Lisa reunite Krusty with his father, who makes amends with Krusty. Later episodes mention Krusty's Judaism and focus on his struggling identity.

In the season 10 episode "Make Room for Lisa", Homer and Lisa visit a New Age store that is portrayed as a compilation of appropriated religious practices and cultures, though Lisa ultimately creates meaning for herself while in the store.

== Episodes with focus on religious topics ==
- "Bart Gets an 'F'" (season two, 1990) – Christianity
- "Homer vs. Lisa and the 8th Commandment" (season two, 1991) – Christianity
- "Like Father, Like Clown" (season three, 1991) – Judaism
- "Homer the Heretic" (season four, 1992) – Christianity and faith
- "Treehouse of Horror IV" (season five, 1993) – the soul and the Devil
- "Bart Sells His Soul" (season seven, 1995) – Christianity and existence of the soul
- "Hurricane Neddy" (season eight, 1996) – Christianity and theodicy
- "In Marge We Trust" (season eight, 1997) – Christianity
- "The Two Mrs. Nahasapeemapetilons" (season nine, 1997) - Hinduism
- "Lisa the Skeptic" (season nine, 1997) – faith, belief in angels, and Judgment Day
- "The Joy of Sect" (season nine, 1998) – sects and cults
- "Simpsons Bible Stories" (season ten, 1999) – Judaism and Christianity
- "Faith Off" (season eleven, 2000) – faith healing
- "Missionary: Impossible" (season eleven, 2000) - Christianity and missionaries
- "Treehouse of Horror XI" (season twelve, 2000) – Christianity, Heaven and Hell
- "I'm Goin' to Praiseland" (season twelve, 2001) – Christianity
- "She of Little Faith" (season thirteen, 2001) – Buddhism, Christianity (Evangelicalism e.x. Megachurch) and leaving one's religion
- "Pray Anything" (season fourteen, 2003) – Christianity
- "Today I Am a Clown" (season fifteen, 2003) – Judaism
- "Homer and Ned's Hail Mary Pass" (season sixteen, 2005) – Christianity
- "Thank God It's Doomsday" (season sixteen, 2005) – Christianity and Judgment Day
- "The Father, the Son, and the Holy Guest Star" (season sixteen, 2005) – Christianity (Catholicism)
- "Simpsons Christmas Stories" (season seventeen, 2005) – Christianity
- "Bart Has Two Mommies" (season seventeen, 2006) – Christianity
- "The Monkey Suit" (season seventeen, 2006) – Creationism vs. Evolution
- "Kiss Kiss, Bang Bangalore" (season seventeen, 2006) – Hinduism and Involuntarily deification
- "Treehouse of Horror XVIII" (season nineteen, 2007) – Christianity, Seven deadly sins
- "MyPods and Boomsticks" (season twenty, 2008) – Islam
- "Gone Maggie Gone" (season twenty, 2009) – Christianity (Catholicism)
- "Rednecks and Broomsticks" (season twenty-one, 2009) – Wicca
- "The Greatest Story Ever D'ohed" (season twenty-one, 2010) – Judaism, Christianity, and Islam
- "A Tree Grows in Springfield" (season twenty-four, 2012) – Faith
- "Dark Knight Court" (season twenty-four, 2013) - Christianity (Orthodoxy and "Scottish Old Believer Presbyterianism")
- "Pulpit Friction" (season twenty-four, 2013) – Christianity and faith
- "Clown in the Dumps" (season twenty-six, 2014) – Judaism and the afterlife
- "My Way or the Highway to Heaven" (season thirty, 2018) – Christianity, Atheism, and Buddhism
- "E My Sports" (season thirty, 2019) – Buddhism (Korean Buddhism and Zen Buddhism)
- "Todd, Todd, Why Hast Thou Forsaken Me?" (season thirty-one, 2019) – Atheism, Doubt, and Christianity
- "Warrin' Priests" (season thirty-one, 2020) – Christianity
- "O C'mon All Ye Faithful" (season thirty-six, 2024) – Christianity and faith

== See also ==
- List of fictional religions
- Politics in The Simpsons
- Religion in Futurama

== Bibliography ==
- Feltmate, David (2017). Drawn to the Gods: Religion and Humor in The Simpsons, South Park, and Family Guy. New York University Press. doi:10.18574/nyu/9781479859184.001.0001. ISBN 9781479859184.
