= Troy McClure =

Fictional character from The Simpsons franchise

- The Simpsons character
- First appearance: "Homer vs. Lisa and the 8th Commandment" (1991)
- Last appearance: "Bart the Mother" (1998)
- Created by: Steve Pepoon; Matt Groening
- Based on: Actors Troy Donahue and Doug McClure (partially)
- Designed by: Matt Groening
- Voiced by: Phil Hartman; Dan Castellaneta (episodes S2E16 and S3E02)

In-universe information
- Gender: Male
- Occupation: Actor, Television presenter
- Spouse: Selma Bouvier (ex-wife)
- Relatives: Marge Simpson (Sister-in-law); Patty Bouvier (Sister-in-law); Homer Simpson (Brother-in-law); Bart Simpson (Nephew); Lisa Simpson (Niece); Maggie Simpson (Niece)

Troy McClure is a fictional character in the American animated series The Simpsons. He was originally voiced by Phil Hartman and first appeared in the second season episode "Homer vs. Lisa and the 8th Commandment". McClure is a washed-up actor who is usually shown doing low-level work, most notably hosting manipulative infomercials and questionable educational films. He appears as the main character in "A Fish Called Selma", in which he marries Selma Bouvier to aid his failing career and quash rumors about his personal life. McClure also hosts "The Simpsons 138th Episode Spectacular" and "The Simpsons Spin-Off Showcase".

McClure was partially based on B-movie actors Troy Donahue and Doug McClure, as well as Hartman himself. Following Hartman's murder on May 28, 1998, two of his Simpsons characters were retired, with Hartman's final speaking appearance as McClure occurring in the tenth season episode "Bart the Mother" four months after his murder. Since then, he has only occasionally cameoed in the background. Since his retirement, McClure has often been cited as one of the series' most popular characters. In 2006, IGN ranked McClure No. 1 on their list of the "Top 25 Simpsons Peripheral Characters".

== Role in The Simpsons ==
Troy McClure is a stereotypical Hollywood has-been. He was a star in the early 1970s, but his career went downhill due to rumors of zoophilia involving fish. In most of his appearances in the show, he hosts short video clips that other characters watch on television or in a public place. He often presents educational videos and infomercials. They are often low-quality, highly erroneous and too short and incomplete to be useful, and feature bizarre topics such as Dig Your Own Grave and Save and Smoke Yourself Thin. McClure introduces himself by saying, "Hi, I'm Troy McClure. You may remember me from such [films, educational videos, voiceovers, etc.] as...," mentioning two titles that are similar to his current performance. For example, in the episode "Bart the Mother", McClure introduces a film about birds by saying, "Hi, I'm Troy McClure. You may remember me from such nature films as Earwigs: Eww! and Man vs. Nature: The Road to Victory." When he auditions to voice the character Poochie in "The Itchy & Scratchy & Poochie Show" (a role he would lose to Homer Simpson), he falls into his introductory style, mentioning his previous role as Christmas Ape.

McClure's most prominent role occurs in the seventh-season episode "A Fish Called Selma". In the episode, McClure begins a relationship with Selma Bouvier, whom he meets when she gives him an eye test at the Department of Motor Vehicles and agrees to go out on a date as a condition for passing him. The relationship revives his career, leading him to star in Stop the Planet of the Apes, I Want to Get Off!, a stage musical version of the film Planet of the Apes. To further boost McClure's career, McClure's agent suggests that he get married. Unaware of McClure's motivation, Selma accepts his proposal, and moves into McClure's house, a Modernist building which resembles the Chemosphere. At his bachelor party, a drunken McClure tells Homer Simpson that the marriage is just a sham to help his career. Homer says nothing at the wedding, but later offhandedly mentions McClure's admission to Marge, who then informs her sister. Selma decides to remain with McClure anyway, but she becomes disturbed when McClure's agent advises the pair to have a child (since "all the big parts these days are going to family men"). Having a child will secure McClure's casting as McBain's sidekick in McBain IV: Fatal Discharge, but Selma is unwilling to bring a child into a loveless relationship and decides to leave McClure. McClure ultimately gets the role, but turns it down in order to direct and star in his own pet project, a 20th Century Fox film called The Contrabulous Fabtraption of Professor Horatio Hufnagel.

In addition to his in-story appearances, McClure appears as host of "The Simpsons 138th Episode Spectacular" and "The Simpsons Spin-Off Showcase". The first is a behind-the-scenes look at The Simpsons, answering questions and featuring extra "never-before-seen" material. The second is an episode presenting three possible spin-offs from The Simpsons.

=== In other media ===
McClure was made into an action figure as part of the World of Springfield toy line, and was released in the "Celebrity Series 1" wave in 2002. He also features briefly in the video game Virtual Springfield, introducing the town of Springfield to the player.

== Character ==
=== Creation ===
McClure was based on the typical "washed up" Hollywood actor. B-movie actors Troy Donahue and Doug McClure served as inspiration for his name and certain character aspects. Doug McClure found the homage funny and his children called him "Troy McClure" when his back was turned. According to show creator Matt Groening, Phil Hartman was cast in the role due to his ability to pull "the maximum amount of humor" out of any line he was given. When he was designed, McClure was given an extra line under his eyes to suggest that the character had gotten a facelift.

In a very brief appearance in the season 2 episode "Bart's Dog Gets an "F"", McClure was voiced by Dan Castellaneta.

=== Development ===
According to executive producer Al Jean, the writers often used McClure as a "panic button" and added the character when they felt an episode needed more humor.

McClure's character is most developed in "A Fish Called Selma", which provides a more in-depth look into his private life and backstory. Showrunners Bill Oakley and Josh Weinstein were fans of Hartman, and wished to make an episode entirely about McClure in order to give Hartman as much to do as possible. From this came the idea of McClure's marriage to Selma Bouvier, as she was "always marrying people". Animator Mark Kirkland was particularly pleased that McClure was the star of the episode. He enjoyed interpreting Hartman's voice-over performances, and the episode allowed him and the other animators to "open [McClure] up visually as a character".

Throughout "A Fish Called Selma", it is hinted that McClure engages in strange sexual behavior. The writers did not initially know what the "unsavory" sexual preference would be, but eventually decided on a fish fetish, using a suggestion from executive producer James L. Brooks. Josh Weinstein described the fish fetish concept as "so perverted and strange, it was over the top."

=== Retirement ===
Phil Hartman was murdered in 1998. Rather than re-casting the role with a new voice actor, the production staff retired McClure, along with Hartman's other recurring character, Lionel Hutz. McClure last appeared in the season ten episode "Bart the Mother", which was dedicated to Hartman. Before his death, Hartman had often expressed an interest in starring in a live-action film about McClure, which would be penned by some of the show's writers. He noted that he was "looking forward to his live-action movie, publicizing [McClure's] Betty Ford appearances." Matt Groening later told Empire that the idea never "got further than enthusiasm", but "would have been really fun". Although retired from speaking roles, the character has still appeared in background roles in subsequent episodes, and is also featured on the Digital Purchase cover for season 30.

== Reception and cultural influence ==
Even after his retirement, McClure remains a popular supporting character. IGN ranked McClure first in their 2006 list of the "Top 25 Simpsons Peripheral Characters", calling him "a wonderfully bizarre and entertaining character that showcases the best of what small roles on The Simpsons can be." In a 2007 article on Simpsons guest stars, Adam Finley of TV Squad wrote that McClure was "responsible for some of the funniest moments in Simpsons history." Hartman ranked first on AOL's list of their favorite 25 Simpsons guest stars. Chris Turner argues in Planet Simpson that McClure and Lionel Hutz "together ... represent the most significant contribution to the show outside of its permanent cast," adding that "the show's Golden Age is hard to imagine without them." He continues, "The smarmy Hollywood type ... has been done to death, but Hartman's version breathed new life into it with each appearance. McClure has become the apotheosis of the stereotype, a gut-achingly funny reinterpretation whose trademark introduction ... has become a shorthand way to describe any grossly artificial media figure."

McClure's most prominent episode, "A Fish Called Selma", is a favorite of many staff members, and has been cited as one of the series' best episodes by several publications. Entertainment Weekly placed the episode eighth on their top 25 The Simpsons episode list, and IGN named the episode the best of the seventh season, calling it the "obvious pick". They also deemed McClure's Planet of the Apes musical the best moment of the episode and "maybe even the whole show".

McClure was one of Hartman's best-known roles. He often used his McClure voice to entertain the audience between takes while taping episodes of NewsRadio. He remarked, "My favorite fans are Troy McClure fans." He added "It's the one thing that I do in my life that's almost an avocation. I do it for the pure love of it." Many obituaries of Hartman mentioned his work as McClure as one of the highlights of his career. The BBC said that "[Hartman's] voice was known to millions" because of McClure and Lionel Hutz.

The title of a song on American indie-rock band Yo La Tengo's ninth full-length album, And Then Nothing Turned Itself Inside-Out, "Let's Save Tony Orlando's House", is based upon a telethon that McClure hosts in the episode "Marge on the Lam". In an interview with the A.V. Club, Ira Kaplan, the singer and guitarist of Yo La Tengo, states that James McNew, the band's bassist, titled a series of instrumentals from the Troy McClure filmography.
