= Frank Grimes (disambiguation) =

Frank Grimes (1947–2025) was an Irish actor.

Frank Grimes may also refer to:

- Frank Grimes, a character in The Simpsons from the episode "Homer's Enemy"
- Frank Grimes, Jr., son of Frank Grimes, from The Simpsons episode "The Great Louse Detective"
- Lt. Frank Grimes, character in the 2002 movie John Q.
- Francis "Frank" Grimes, character in the show Ugly Americans
