= Treehouse of Horror XVIII =

- The Simpsons episode
- Promotional image for the episode.
- Episode no.: Season 19; Episode 5
- Directed by: Chuck Sheetz
- Written by: Marc Wilmore
- Production code: JABF16
- Original air date: November 4, 2007

Guest appearance
- Maurice LaMarche

Episode features
- Commentary: Al Jean; Tim Long; Jeff Westbrook; Tom Gammill; Max Pross; David Silverman; Chuck Sheetz

Episode chronology
← Previous "I Don't Wanna Know Why the Caged Bird Sings"	Next → "Little Orphan Millie"
- The Simpsons season 19

"Treehouse of Horror XVIII" is the fifth episode of the nineteenth season of the American animated television series The Simpsons. It first aired on the Fox network in the United States on November 4, 2007. In the eighteenth annual Treehouse of Horror episode, Bart harbors Kodos the alien in "E.T., Go Home," Homer and Marge are husband and wife assassins who try to take each other out in "Mr. & Mrs. Simpson," and Ned Flanders is given God-like powers during his demonstration on the wages of sin in "Heck House." It was written by Marc Wilmore and directed by Chuck Sheetz. Maggie Simpson does not appear in this episode.

It is also the first Treehouse of Horror episode to premiere after the movie.

== Plot ==
In the opening sequence, Marge talks about Halloween being "last week" and suddenly various logos for other Fox shows pop up on the screen, including the mini logos for American Idol, Fox Sports, Prison Break, Cops, House, and 24. Marge winds up killing several miniature characters that pop up from the logos (except the Prison Break one, which has the characters running away from the scene) and bakes them into meatloaf, which she serves to her family. When she cuts it, the other characters' body parts are shown to spell out the title of the episode and the opening credits (Homer eats the piece with the "developed by" credit, says "Mmmmmmm, developed by", and drools).

=== E.T., Go Home ===
In a parody of E.T. the Extra-Terrestrial, Marge tells Bart to get butane from their "butane storage shed" in the back yard. As he does so, he finds Kodos there. Kodos states his desire is to return home and that he had come to Earth in peace, though he hints that he was really sent there to destroy mankind. Bart, however, is oblivious to this, and decides to help him return home. Lisa arrives and is happy with the alien in their home and decides to help Bart and Kodos obtain a list of devices (including two tickets to see Avenue Q, Uranium, and "7 billion body bags") that he can use to contact his home planet, though this appears to be part of his diabolical plan. Homer discovers Kodos when the two accidentally share a shower, but he and Marge decide to let the kids help Kodos anyway, after Kodos hints it would be racist to turn him away (He said that they did not want him in the house because he was Jewish). When NASA agents arrive at the Simpsons home, Homer distracts them by dressing as Abraham Lincoln while Bart sneaks Kodos out. However, when Kodos kills several agents along the way, Bart begins to think Kodos's intentions are not as friendly as he was led to believe. Finally, Kodos reveals that the devices he had the Simpsons collect were for a portal-generating device so that others of his planet can come to Earth and wipe out the human race and eat their heads. When the aliens (including Kang) invade, the rest of the Simpson family shows up, along with the military. A brief war is waged, and Earth ultimately overpowers the aliens (the massive heads of Kodos' species make them easy targets for attack helicopters). When Bart is given the option to board a helicopter and shoot Kodos, Bart, seeing Kodos' smile, decides to spare him. However, Homer shoots Kodos several times. In the end, Earth emerges victorious and the world is saved. The Simpsons are invited to see Kodos's dissection, where they reflect that since Kodos was an evil-looking alien who turned out to be bad, it must be good to judge a book by its cover. It is revealed that Kodos is still very much alive, as he points what is happening is actually vivisection, only to be suffocated with a pillow by Homer.

=== Mr. & Mrs. Simpson ===
In a parody of Mr. & Mrs. Smith, Homer and Marge are at a marriage counseling session, recounting a brief moment of tension between them.

In the flashback, when arriving home, Homer locks himself in the bathroom and communicates on a hidden flat screen television, where it is revealed Homer is an assassin assigned to eliminate news reporter, Kent Brockman, by order of Homer's boss, Mr. Burns. Although the bathroom is locked, Bart somehow got in and is sitting on a Mortar, which was the toilet. Before he leaves, he tells Marge he will be coming home late from "Midnight Monkey Madness." Marge also states that she is busy turning over wheelbarrows. When Homer prepares to shoot Brockman at his rooftop party from a faraway platform, a woman with large blonde hair stabs Brockman in the chest. After Homer attempts to repeatedly shoot the woman (ending up with several civilian deaths), he manages to shoot the wig off her head, revealing her to be Marge.

Arriving home, the two avoid each other's eyes, and Marge makes an excuse for the blonde wig. Unfortunately at dinner, Homer is unable to control his anger. which leads the two attempting to kill one another with various weapons such as grenades, rifles, and a minigun, all the while arguing why the other was an assassin, end up destroying most of their house, and killing Grampa. After Chief Wiggum interrupts with a complaint from an "anonymous neighborino", Marge shoots him with a crossbow, killing him (even though he states he would have taken a bribe). The two then realize they are more attracted with one another when they kill someone together. For this, they soon begin making love over Wiggum's body and, back to where the episode started, they both realized that they did not need any marriage counseling, but to kill people together. In the end, it turns out that the two were called into Principal Skinner's office to discuss Bart's misbehavior on the bus, with Skinner wondering why the two thought they were in a marriage counselor's office. The two promptly shoot Skinner.

=== Heck House ===
Bart (dressed as Frankenstein's monster), Lisa (dressed as a witch), Milhouse (dressed as an astronaut) and Nelson (dressed as a hobo) become frustrated when Agnes Skinner refuses to give them candy on Halloween night and instead spits into Milhouse's plastic pumpkin full of candy. Deciding that pranks are more fun than candy, they begin to focus on the 'trick' part of "trick-or-treat," and begin to play tricks on some of the town's population. Soon, however, their pranks shift into vandalism (and even thievery when they tie up Lenny and steal his TV), and their victims gather at the Simpson house to complain. Homer tried to calm the crowd by characterizing the pranks as childish mischief until he is himself "pranked" by the kids on the roof above him, who drop a live pig which lands on his head. Sideshow Mel exclaims that "those monsters must be stopped", prompting Ned Flanders to offer his help. He decorates the local church to look like a haunted house called Heck House, which lures the children in.

It is revealed the haunted house is actually a morality play in disguise (a "Hell house"). Ned Flanders tries to scare the children into righteousness through the use of crude theatre performed by Principal Skinner, Reverend Lovejoy, and Ned's two kids Rod and Tod. However, the pranksters scoff at his attempt, causing Ned to angrily turn to the heavens and ask for the power to "psychologically torture" the kids into loving God. Lightning flashes and Ned is transformed into the Devil (reprising his role from "Treehouse of Horror IV" though lacking goat legs), and then sends the kids to Hell. There he produces an enormous crystal ball which reveals Springfield to be full of sin, specifically the Seven Deadly Sins. The crystal ball shows:

- Gluttony: Homer slurps his spaghetti too fast and ends up being turned into spaghetti himself. (he asks for more bread)
- Wrath (called Anger here): Groundskeeper Willie kicks his tractor in frustration and ends up decapitated by it after it transforms into a robot.
- Pride: Doctor Hibbert gets crushed by a truck (driven by Hans Moleman) after putting a "My Child Is An Honor Student" bumper sticker on his car and taking pride in it.
- Sloth: Homer is killed again (despite pointing out that he already died from eating the "magic spaghetti") when he slides through the mesh of a hammock and gets cubed to pieces.
- Lust, Greed, and Envy: Moe gazes over at a stripper dancing for him, tries to steal her money back for himself, and envies "the crotchless" after getting kicked in the groin.

A wider view of Hell is then shown, with various citizens of Springfield being punished for their sins on Earth, in a reference to the Inferno section of Dante's Divine Comedy. The children are terrified and promise never to sin again and to only "pray and fight in wars"; they are then sent back to Earth while Ned transforms back to his standard human form. The episode ends with Ned telling the viewers that they will go to Hell for watching Fox, as well as FX, Fox Sports and "our newest devil's portal", The Wall Street Journal, which he welcomes to the "club".

== Production ==
On July 27, 2007, creator Matt Groening and the producers attended a panel which encompassed the topics of both The Simpsons Movie, and the nineteenth season. The panel revealed that Peter Griffin from Family Guy is one of the miniature characters featured in the opening sequence, although he appears as a cameo from the scene.

== Cultural references ==
The segment "E.T., Go Home" parodies the film E.T. the Extra-Terrestrial and it puns E.T.'s most famous quote, "E.T., phone home!", with Bart in the role of Eliott and Kodos as E.T. When Marge calls Bart he is watching Samba with the Stars, a parody of Dancing with the Stars. Lisa says "I can't believe that an alien who looked so evil turned out to be bad", a reference to Arthur C. Clarke's Childhood's End. The "Mr. and Mrs. Simpson" segment is a parody of the 2005 film Mr. and Mrs. Smith. In the final segment, Heck House, Groundskeeper Willie's tractor transforms into a robot and kills him, parodying Transformers. Hell, as depicted in "Heck House" is inspired by The Garden of Earthly Delights painted by Dutch Renaissance painter Hieronymus Bosch. The frame story of "Heck House" is inspired by the horror film classic Seven Footprints to Satan. Like in the film, has the Heck House the function to teach about morality.

== Reception ==
=== Ratings ===
In its original American broadcast, the episode averaged 11.7 million viewers and a 5.7 overnight Nielsen rating and a 13 percent audience share, making it the highest rated episode of the season. Combined with a new episode of Family Guy, it tied for first in the 8:00 PM hour with the NFL Pregame show on NBC. Despite this, the Fox Network finished the night fourth overall in ratings.

=== Critical reception ===
Robert Canning of IGN called the opening segment, E.T., Go Home, "the weakest segment because it just wasn't really all that funny", and thought the end of the segment was the weakest part of the episode, writing "watching the military decimate the aliens and then seeing Homer use a pillow to suffocate Kodos at the end was really off-putting. The deaths weren't funny, just uncomfortable." Canning, however, described the final two segments, as well as the opening as being solid segments. He gave the overall episode a rating of 7.4/10.

Richard Keller of TV Squad said the episode was "pretty forgettable" and was neither funny not scary. He was not sure how the middle segment was relevant to Halloween.
