= Bart Sells His Soul =

- The Simpsons episode
- Promotional artwork for the episode
- Episode no.: Season 7 Episode 4
- Directed by: Wes Archer
- Written by: Greg Daniels
- Production code: 3F02
- Original air date: October 8, 1995

Guest appearance
- Pamela Hayden as Milhouse

Episode features
- Chalkboard gag: "I am not a lean, mean, spitting machine"
- Couch gag: The Simpsons drive to the couch in motorized clown carts.
- Commentary: Matt Groening; Bill Oakley; Josh Weinstein; Greg Daniels; Wes Archer; David Silverman

Episode chronology
← Previous "Home Sweet Homediddly-Dum-Doodily"	Next → "Lisa the Vegetarian"
- The Simpsons season 7

"Bart Sells His Soul" is the fourth episode of the seventh season of the American animated television series The Simpsons. It first aired on Fox in the United States on October 8, 1995. In the episode, Bart, after being punished for playing a prank at church, scornfully dismisses the concept of the soul, and to show he is serious in his skepticism, he agrees to sell his soul to Milhouse. However, after several ongoing strange events make him think he really has lost his soul, he desperately tries to regain it.

This episode was written by Greg Daniels, who was inspired by an experience from his youth where he had purchased a bully's soul. Director Wes Archer and his team of animators visited Chili's for examples to use in Moe's family restaurant. The episode includes cultural references to the 1968 song "In-A-Gadda-Da-Vida" by Iron Butterfly, which is played during the show (as "In the Garden of Eden"), and Chilean poet Pablo Neruda, as well as a parody of Judy Blume's 1970 book Are You There God? It's Me, Margaret.

The episode was critically acclaimed and is regarded as one of the series' best. The creative team of The Simpsons puts the episode among the top five best episodes of the series, and series creator Matt Groening cited "Bart Sells His Soul" as one of his favorite episodes. Writers from the fields of religion, philosophy, popular culture, and psychology cited the episode in books discussing The Simpsons and the show's approach to the nature of the soul. It has also been used by secondary schools in religious education courses as a teaching tool.

== Plot ==
As punishment for changing the church's opening hymn as a prank to "In-A-Gadda-Da-Vida" by Iron Butterfly, Reverend Lovejoy makes Bart clean the organ pipes; Milhouse also receives the same punishment for snitching on Bart. Bart is furious with Milhouse, who defends himself by saying he did not want his soul to go to hell. Bart declares that there is no such thing as a soul, prompting him to sell to Milhouse a $5 paper that reads "Bart Simpson's Soul". Lisa warns Bart that he will regret selling his soul, but he dismisses her fears.

Bart experiences several unusual phenomena, such as automatic doors refusing to open for him and no longer finding any humor in Itchy and Scratchy. He begins to fear that he really has lost his soul and tries to get it back from Milhouse, who refuses to return it for less than $50. After having a nightmare and being taunted by Lisa, Bart again desperately tries to persuade Milhouse to return his soul, going so far as to travel across town after the Van Houten family moved out of their house due to fumigation. Milhouse informs Bart that he traded the paper to Comic Book Guy at the Android's Dungeon for ALF-themed POGs.

The next morning, Comic Book Guy tells Bart that he sold the paper, but refuses to reveal its new owner. Saddened, Bart walks home in the rain and prays to God for his soul in his bedroom. When the paper floats down in front of him, Bart discovers that Lisa bought his soul to return it to him. While she explains philosophers' views on the human soul, Bart eats the paper, overjoyed at getting his soul back.

In the subplot, Moe tries to expand his customer base by turning his bar into a family theme restaurant with the name Uncle Moe's Family Feedbag. However, Moe's surly personality proves to be unfitting for him running a family restaurant; that, along with the stress of running the business by himself, ultimately unnerves him, and he soon snaps at a little girl. The horrified customers abandon the restaurant, forcing Moe's to revert to a run-down tavern.

== Production ==
"Bart Sells His Soul" was the second episode to have Bill Oakley and Josh Weinstein as executive producers. Oakley and Weinstein wanted to start the season with episodes that had an emotional bias in an effort to center the Simpson family. The episode was written by Greg Daniels, who originally had an idea for a plot that dealt with racism in Springfield. The writers did not think The Simpsons was the right forum for it, so Daniels suggested the idea of selling someone's soul, which originated in his childhood. In high school, Daniels encouraged a bully to sell him his soul for 50 cents, and then convinced classmates to frighten the bully into buying his soul back for an inflated price. Daniels repeated this ploy, but stopped when he realized that the only other person in history who has profited off others' souls was Satan, and that "scared" him. In the opening scene of the episode, the congregation of the First Church of Springfield are tricked into singing "In the Garden of Eden" by "I. Ron Butterfly". Daniels had originally intended for the song to be "Jesus He Knows Me" by British rock band Genesis, and Oakley claims they wanted to use "Stairway to Heaven" by "Led Zeppelin" but the producers were unable to obtain the rights for either to be featured in the episode.

The episode was directed by Wes Archer. Archer and his team of animators went to the restaurant chain Chili's to get inspiration for the background designs of Moe's family restaurant. He said it was "quite a task" to transform Moe's Tavern into a family-oriented establishment. Archer added that he was not "quite happy" with the result, and that they could have designed it "a little better". Weinstein recalled that there was contention between the animators about the way Moe looked in the episode. Moe's original design includes a missing tooth, but Weinstein and Oakley felt that it did not "look right" because Moe was such a prominent character in the episode. Archer showed the original design of Moe from the first season to the show runners, and said: "Here, look. He's got a missing tooth!", but the scenes that had Moe with a missing tooth in them were still reanimated. Archer was disappointed with the dream sequence in which Bart sees his friends playing with their souls. Archer said that he had forgotten to tell the animators to make the souls transparent, so they were painted blue instead. George Meyer pitched the joke restaurant title "The Texas Cheesecake Depository."

== Themes ==
Kurt M. Koenigsberger comments in his 2003 book Leaving Springfield that "a good deal of enjoyment" is to be had from the episode, due to "the exposure of the hypocrisy behind 'the finance of salvation' and the ambivalent operations of the commercial world". Don Cupitt, a fellow of Emmanuel College, Cambridge, believes that when Lisa lectures Bart about the soul, she "shows a degree of theological sophistication which is simply not tolerated in Britain." Paul Bloom and David Pizarro wrote in the 2006 book The Psychology of The Simpsons that although Lisa does show "healthy religious skepticism", she still believes in an eternal soul. However, Lisa tells Bart at the end of the episode, "some philosophers believe that no one is born with a soul; you have to earn one through suffering, and thought, and prayer". Bloom and Pizarro acknowledge: "Indeed, some philosophers and theologians say that without belief in a soul, one cannot make sense of the social concepts on which we rely, such as personal responsibility and freedom of the will."

M. Keith Booker cites the episode in his 2006 book Drawn to Television, while discussing The Simpsons' treatment of religion. Booker cites a scene from the episode where Milhouse asks Bart what religions have to gain by lying about concepts such as the existence of a soul – and then the scene cuts to Reverend Lovejoy counting his money; Booker believes that this implies that religions create mythologies so that they can gain money from followers. He juxtaposes this with Bart's realization later in the episode that "life suddenly feels empty and incomplete" without a soul, which suggests "either that the soul is real or it is at least a useful fiction". Mark I. Pinsky and Samuel F. Parvin discuss the episode in their book The Gospel According to the Simpsons: Leader's Guide for Group Study, and use examples from it to stimulate discussion among youth about the nature of the soul. Pinsky and Parvin note Bart's statement to Milhouse from the beginning of the episode: "Soul – come on, Milhouse, there's no such thing as a soul. It's just something they made up to scare kids, like the Boogie Man or Michael Jackson", and then suggest questions to ask students, including whether they know individuals that agree with Bart, and their views on the existence of a soul.

In the 2004 book Planet Simpson, Chris Turner quotes Bart's revelation to Lisa that he sold his soul to Milhouse for five dollars and used the money to buy sponges shaped like dinosaurs. After Lisa criticizes Bart for selling his soul, Bart responds: "Poor gullible Lisa. I'll keep my crappy sponges, thanks." Turner comments: "Here Bart is the epitome of the world-weary hipster, using the degraded language of modern marketing to sell off the most sacred parts of himself because he knows that some cheap sponge is more real, hence more valuable, than even the loftiest of abstract principles."

== Cultural references ==
On the DVD audio commentary for the episode, writer Greg Daniels cited Martin Scorsese's 1985 film After Hours as an influence on Bart's night-time trek to retrieve his soul from Milhouse, only to experience a series of unusual encounters. Reverend Lovejoy leads his congregation in a hymnal version of the song "In-A-Gadda-Da-Vida", by Iron Butterfly, titled "In the Garden of Eden", by "I. Ron Butterfly".

During an argument between Lisa and Bart, while discussing the relationship between laughter and the soul, Lisa quotes Chilean poet Pablo Neruda, and Bart responds "I am familiar with the works of Pablo Neruda." Kurt M. Koenigsberger comments in Leaving Springfield: "While Bart may be familiar with the canon of Chilean poetry, the joke takes its force in part from the probability that The Simpsons' viewers are not." Bart begins a prayer to God with "Are you there, God? It's me, Bart Simpson". This is an allusion to the 1970 book Are You There God? It's Me, Margaret., by Judy Blume. During a piggyback fight with Dolph Starbeam, Jimbo Jones exclaims, "I'm Master Blaster," referencing the fearsome Thunderdome athlete from the 1985 film Mad Max Beyond Thunderdome. The chalkboard gag is a reference to the advertising slogan of the lean mean grilling machine by George Foreman. The title of The Itchy & Scratchy Show episode "Skinless in Seattle" is a reference to the 1993 film Sleepless in Seattle. When Ned Flanders says, "Well, I expect that type of language at Denny's, but not here!", it is a reference to Denny's racial discrimination lawsuit in the early 1990s. The scene of the exterminator answering Milhouse's door wearing a protective suit resembles a scene in E.T. the Extra-Terrestrial.

== Reception ==
In its original broadcast, "Bart Sells His Soul" finished 43rd in the ratings for the week of October 2–8, 1995, with a Nielsen rating of 8.8, equivalent to approximately 8.4 million viewing households. It was the fourth highest-rated show on the Fox network that week after The X-Files, Melrose Place, and Beverly Hills, 90210.

Since airing, "Bart Sells His Soul" has received critical acclaim. In July 2007, an article in the San Mateo County Times notes that "Bart Sells His Soul" is seen as one of "the most popular episodes in Simpsons history". Noel Holston of the Star Tribune highlighted the episode in the paper's "Critic's choice" section. The Intelligencer Journal described "Bart Sells His Soul" as "a particularly good episode" of The Simpsons. The Lansing State Journal highlighted the episode in the season seven DVD release, along with the conclusion of "Who Shot Mr. Burns?" and "The Simpsons 138th Episode Spectacular". The Sunday Herald Sun called it one of the "show's most memorable episodes", as did The Courier Mail.

The Aberdeen Press & Journal described the episode as "one of the darkest episodes of the Simpsons". In their section on the episode in the book I Can't Believe It's a Bigger and Better Updated Unofficial Simpsons Guide, Gary Russell and Gareth Roberts comment: "Undoubtedly the most disturbing episode of the series, with Bart's nightmare of losing his soul – illustrated by a macabre playground where all the souls of his playmates are visible, and his is tagging along with Milhouse – more frightening than funny. ... An illustration of just how far the series could go by this point."

The episode remains well-received among Simpsons staff. In April 2003, the episode was listed by the Simpsons creative team as one of the top five best episodes of the series, along with "Last Exit to Springfield", "Cape Feare", "22 Short Films About Springfield", and "Homer at the Bat". In a 2005 interview, Simpsons creator Matt Groening said he doesn't "have a single favorite" episode but cited "Bart Sells His Soul" and "Homer's Enemy" as among episodes he loves. Bart's voice actress Nancy Cartwright stated "Bart Sells His Soul" is one of her top three episodes together with "Lisa's Substitute" and "Bart the Mother". Lisa's voice actress Yeardley Smith stated in an interview that "Bart Sells His Soul" is one of her favorite episodes along with "Girly Edition".

Commenting on the episode's themes in The A.V. Club, Erik Adams writes that "If 'Bart Sells His Soul' has anything to say about the value of the human spirit, it's glimpsed in those final moments of Bart and his see-through Buddy ramming into Martin's rowboat. Obeying an authority figure like Lovejoy only does so much for the soul. Being true to yourself is much more spiritually nourishing." He adds that "I often think I quote 'The Itchy & Scratchy & Poochie Show' more than any other episode, until I rewatch 'Bart Sells His Soul.'" The episode has been used in church courses in Connecticut and in the United Kingdom about the nature of a soul, and was shown by a minister in Scotland in one of his sermons. A 2005 report on religious education in secondary schools, by the United Kingdom education regulator Office for Standards in Education, Children's Services and Skills (Ofsted), noted that the episode was being used as a teaching tool.

== See also ==
- Religion in The Simpsons
