= The Simpsons Spin-Off Showcase =

- The Simpsons episode
- The new "Lisa" and the regular family members in their variety hour, the episode's third segment.
- Episode no.: Season 8 Episode 24
- Directed by: Neil Affleck
- Story by: Ken Keeler
- Teleplay by: David X. Cohen; Dan Greaney; Steve Tompkins
- Production code: 4F20
- Original air date: May 11, 1997

Guest appearances
- Tim Conway as himself; Gailard Sartain as Charles "Big" Daddy; Phil Hartman as Troy McClure

Episode features
- Commentary: Matt Groening; Josh Weinstein; David X. Cohen; Dan Greaney; Yeardley Smith; Ken Keeler

Episode chronology
← Previous "Homer's Enemy"	Next → "The Secret War of Lisa Simpson"
- The Simpsons season 8

"The Simpsons Spin-Off Showcase" is the twenty-fourth and penultimate episode of the eighth season of the American animated television series The Simpsons. It originally aired on the Fox network in the United States on May 11, 1997. The episode centers on fictional pilot episodes of non-existent television series derived from The Simpsons, and is a parody of the tendency of networks to spin off characters from a hit series. As such it includes references to many different television series. The first fictional spin-off is Chief Wiggum P.I., a cop-dramedy featuring Chief Wiggum and Seymour Skinner. The second is The Love-matic Grampa, a sitcom featuring Moe Szyslak who receives dating advice from Abraham Simpson, whose ghost is possessing a love testing machine. The final segment is The Simpson Family Smile-Time Variety Hour, a variety show featuring the Simpson family except for Lisa, who has been replaced.

The episode was written by David X. Cohen, Dan Greaney and Steve Tompkins, with Ken Keeler coming up with the story and the general idea of intentionally bad writing. It was directed by Neil Affleck, and Tim Conway, Gailard Sartain and Phil Hartman guest-starred.

The producers were initially uneasy about the episode, as they feared that the purposely bad writing would be mistaken for actual bad writing. The episode, however, now appears on several lists of the most popular Simpsons episodes.

== Plot ==
Troy McClure hosts a television special from the "Museum of TV and Television" introducing three spin-off productions, created using characters from The Simpsons. The Fox network has only three programs — The Simpsons, The X-Files and Melrose Place — prepared for the next broadcasting season, and so commissions the producers of The Simpsons to create thirty-five new shows to fill the remainder of the lineup. Unable to handle such a workload, the producers create only three new shows.

=== "Chief Wiggum, P.I." ===
"Chief Wiggum, P.I." is a crime-dramedy spin-off and a parody of Magnum, P.I., which follows Chief Wiggum, Ralph and Seymour Skinner. Chief Wiggum and his son Ralph move to New Orleans following Wiggum's removal from the Springfield Police Department for corruption, with Seymour Skinner as Wiggum's sidekick. Wiggum has proclaimed that he will "clean up the city" of New Orleans, but it does not take long before he meets his nemesis, Charles "Big" Daddy, who warns Wiggum to stay out of his business. Soon after, Ralph is kidnapped and Wiggum finds Big Daddy's calling card left behind. Wiggum manages to track Big Daddy's ransom call to the Mardi Gras, where he briefly runs into the Simpson family, and the two chase each other to Big Daddy's mansion in the New Orleans bayou (in reality the Louisiana Governor's Mansion which Big Daddy had managed to steal). Chief Wiggum then threatens Big Daddy with a gun, but Big Daddy counters by tossing Ralph at his father, then jumping out the window and swimming away (at an extremely slow speed, due to his weight). Wiggum ultimately lets the villain escape, feeling that he will meet him again "each and every week", a riff on serialized, weekly television dramas.

=== "The Love-matic Grampa" ===
"The Love-matic Grampa" is a sitcom about Moe's love life, a parody of My Mother the Car. He receives advice from the ghost of Abraham Simpson, who was crushed by a store shelf containing cans of figs that toppled on him and subsequently "while travelling up toward Heaven…got lost along the way" and now possesses Moe's love tester machine. Moe ends up getting a date he meets at the bar. On Grampa's advice he takes his date out to a French restaurant and hides the Love Tester in the bathroom so he can get advice while at the restaurant. After Kearney, Dolph and Jimbo whack the machine because it said they were gay, it malfunctions and advises Moe to tell his date that "her rump's as big as the Queen's, and twice as fragrant." Moe returns with a bowl of snails dumped on his head and his dependence on the machine is revealed, so he confesses to receiving advice. His date is actually happy when she hears this, flattered that Moe would go to all that trouble for her. Grampa asks to be introduced to an attractive payphone in front of the restaurant, much to the mirth of Moe and his date.

=== "The Simpson Family Smile-Time Variety Hour" ===
"The Simpson Family Smile-Time Variety Hour" is a variety show featuring various songs and sketches in a parody of The Brady Bunch Hour and Rowan & Martin's Laugh-In. It features Homer, Marge, Bart, and Maggie. Lisa refuses to participate, but is replaced by a blonde teenaged girl. After the introduction there is a sketch, where the family are portrayed as beavers living in a dam with Tim Conway as a skunk and Homer's boss. The show ends with a medley of songs about candy sung by the family, Jasper Beardley and Waylon Smithers.

Troy ends the special with a look at the upcoming season of The Simpsons, filled with ridiculous plot twists, such as Homer turning Lisa into a frog using magical powers, the discovery of Bart's two long-lost identical twin brothers (one African-American, the other a cowboy), Selma marrying Lenny, Bumblebee Man, and Itchy (in succession), and Homer meeting an alien named Ozmodiar whom only he can see.

== Production ==
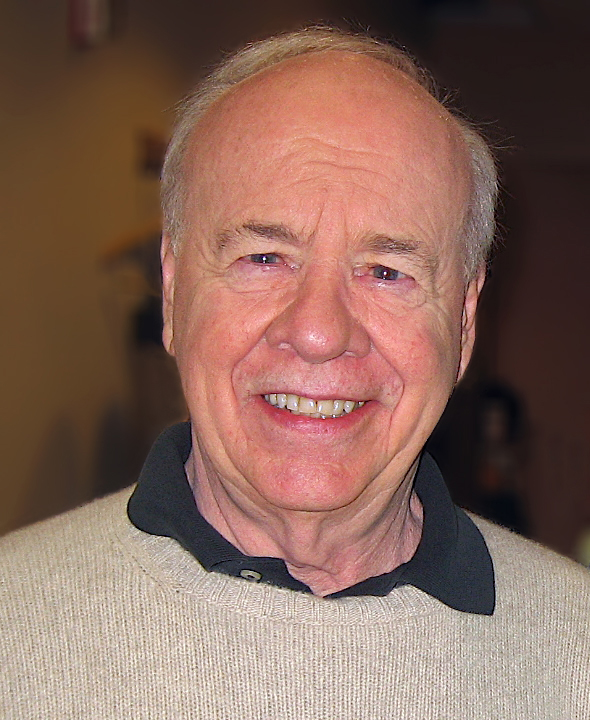
Tim Conway appears as himself in the episode's third segment.

Ken Keeler came up with the idea for the episode from the one sentence statement: "Let's do spin-offs". His idea was to use intentionally bad writing and "crazy plots", which underlines their critique of spin-offs in general. After he had pitched the idea it was decided that "it was an idea that ought to work pretty well" and production went ahead. Creator Matt Groening was uneasy about the idea, feeling that it could be mistranslated as actually bad sitcom writing. He also did not like the idea of breaking the fourth wall and the concept of saying that the Simpsons were just actors in a television show. The idea was later explored in the season 11 episode "Behind the Laughter". One of the "crazy" ideas was the inclusion of the character of Ozmodiar, who was originally included in the script for an earlier episode but was considered too ridiculous for the time. When this episode came along the character seemed to fit with the story and was included. Even though Keeler came up with the story, David S. Cohen, Dan Greaney and Steve Tompkins wrote the scripts for the three segments. Cohen wrote Chief Wiggum P.I., Greaney wrote Love-matic Grampa and Tompkins wrote The Simpson Family Smile-Time Variety Hour.

The episode demanded a different approach to directing than a usual The Simpsons episode. Director Neil Affleck had to animate each segment so that it fit the style of the show it parodied. The Love-matic Grampa segment for instance emulates a three-camera setup, as is normally used in sitcoms.

Three guest stars appear in the episode; Phil Hartman as Troy McClure, Tim Conway as himself and Gailard Sartain as Big Daddy. McClure is used as a host of the episode, something he had previously done in the episode "The Simpsons 138th Episode Spectacular". Conway, a comic veteran, was known for his work on The Carol Burnett Show, which has a similar format to The Simpson Family Smile-Time Variety Hour. Due to an older teenager (voiced by Pamela Hayden) being substituted for Lisa in the third segment, Yeardley Smith speaks only one line in the entire episode. This makes it one of four times Lisa has a minor role in a Season 8 episode, as she did in "Bart After Dark", "Grade School Confidential" and "Homer's Enemy".

=== Proposed real spin-offs ===
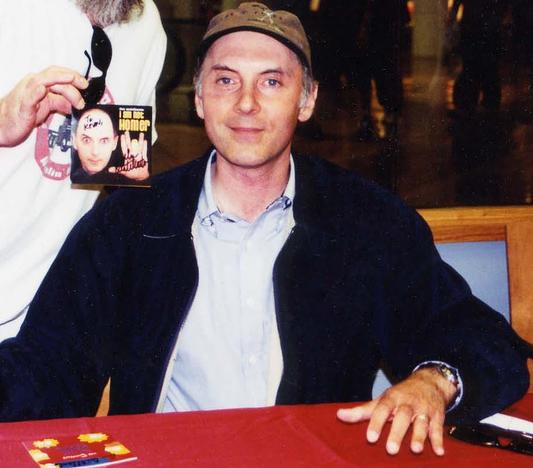
Dan Castellaneta was set to reprise his role of Krusty the Clown in a live-action series created by Matt Groening.

Over the course of the show, the staff have considered producing several spin-off television series and films based on The Simpsons. In 1994, Matt Groening pitched a live-action spin-off from The Simpsons that centered on Krusty the Clown and would have starred Dan Castellaneta in the role, reprising the character from The Simpsons. He and Michael Weithorn wrote a pilot script where Krusty moved to Los Angeles and got his own talk show. A recurring joke throughout the script was that Krusty lived in a house on wooden stilts which were continuously being gnawed by beavers. Eventually, the contract negotiations fell apart and Groening decided to stop work on the project.

"22 Short Films About Springfield" sparked the idea amongst the staff for a spin-off series titled Tales from Springfield. The proposed show would focus on the town in general, rather than the Simpson family. Every week would be a different scenario: three short stories, an adventure with young Homer or a story about a background character that was not tied into the Simpson family at all. The idea never came to anything, as Groening realized that the staff did not have the manpower to produce another show as well as The Simpsons. The staff, however, say it is something that they would still be interested in doing, and that it "could happen someday."

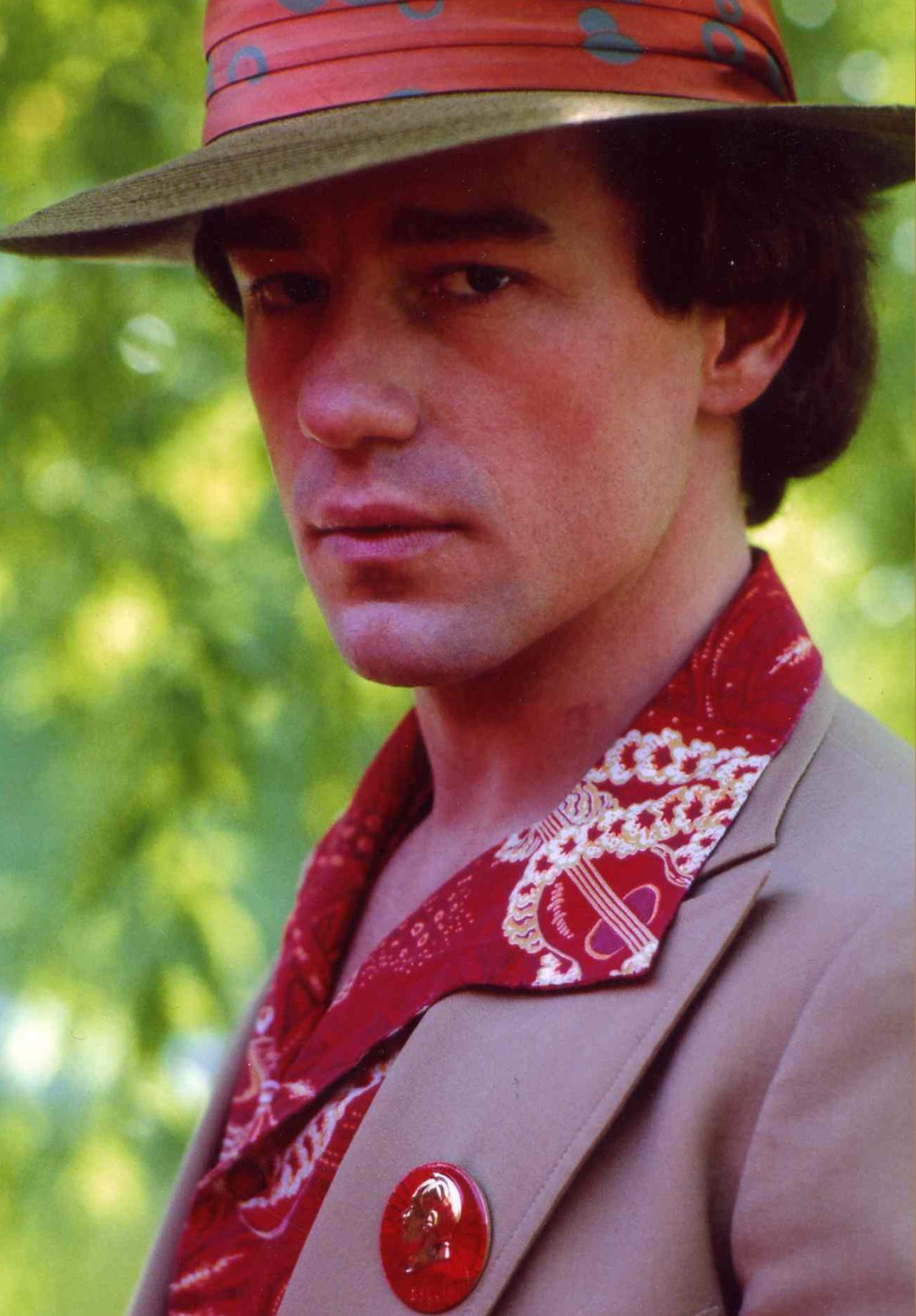
Phil Hartman had wished to make a live-action film based on his character Troy McClure, but the project was cancelled following his murder in 1998.

Groening also expressed a wish to make Simpstasia, a parody of Fantasia, but it was never produced, partly because it would have been too difficult to write a feature-length script, although a similar idea did appear in the episode "Itchy & Scratchy Land". Before his murder, Phil Hartman had said he had wished to make a live-action film based around his character of Troy McClure, and several of the show's staff had expressed a desire to help create it. Groening later told Empire that the idea never "got further than enthusiasm", but "would have been really fun".

== Cultural references ==
The entire episode is a satire of unoriginal, poor television writing and references, and parodies many television series. When McClure mentions that Fox can only fill up three slots for the next season, the three series are Melrose Place, The X-Files, and The Simpsons itself. In the museum of television, Troy walks by posters of spin-offs, such as The Ropers (spun off from Three's Company), Laverne & Shirley (spun off from Happy Days), Rhoda, a show that Julie Kavner, the voice of Marge, once starred in (spun off from The Mary Tyler Moore Show), and Fish (spun off from Barney Miller), to demonstrate the power of spin-offs. Troy walks by a poster of The Jeffersons (a spin-off of All in the Family) twice, because the writers could not think of any more spin-offs.

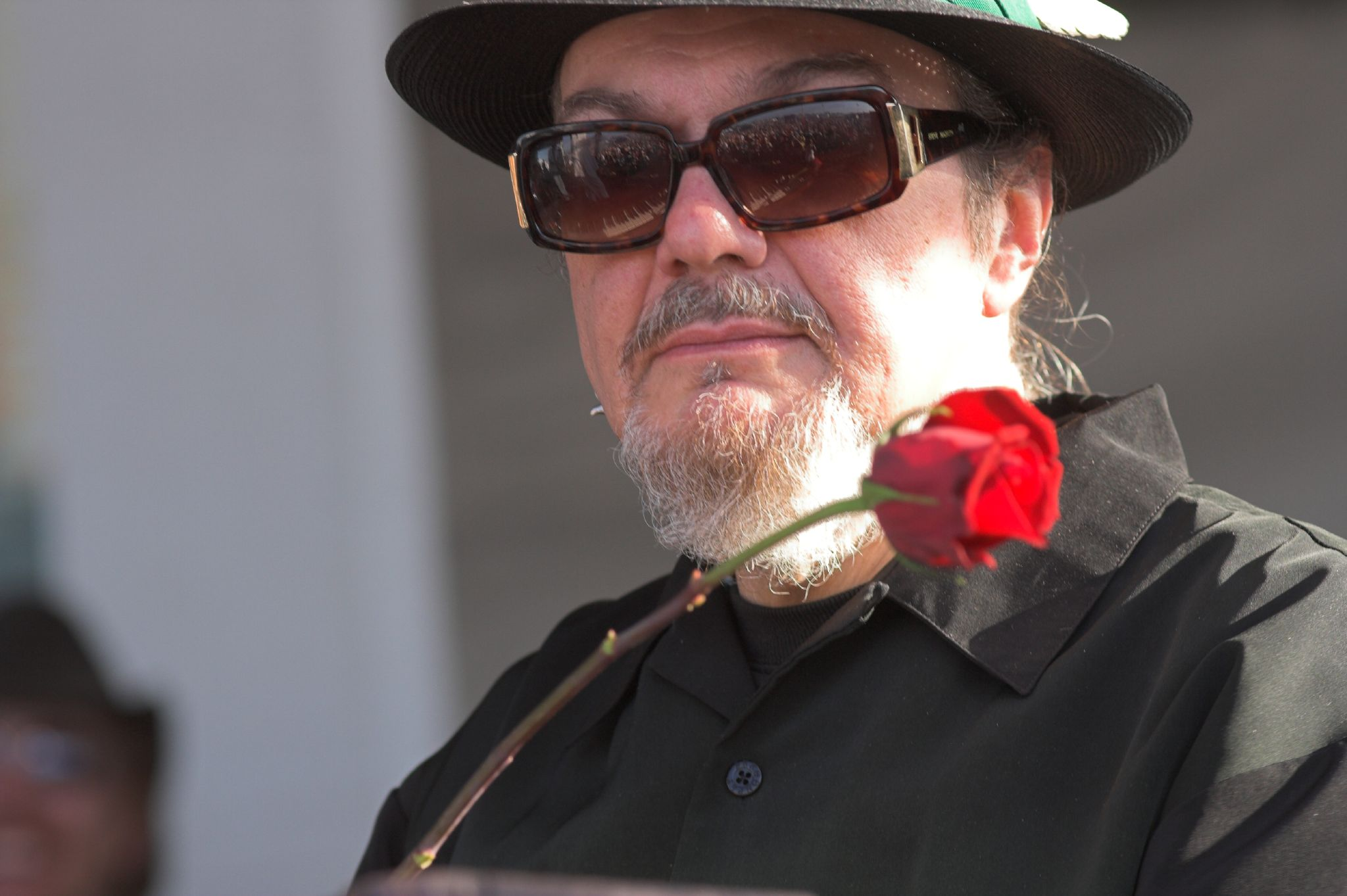
The character Big Daddy is based on New Orleans musician Dr. John.

Chief Wiggum, P.I. is a parody of police-dramas, such as Miami Vice; Magnum, P.I.; and Starsky & Hutch. Skinner emulates Don Johnson from Miami Vice in order to look scruffier. The character of Big Daddy is based on Dr. John, who comes from New Orleans. The chef in the restaurant resembles Paul Prudhomme.

The Love-matic Grampa is a parody of fantasy sitcoms such as Mister Ed, I Dream of Jeannie, and Bewitched as well as having similarities to My Mother the Car. The Love-matic Grampa machine singing "Daisy Bell" in a distorted manner when its electrical circuits are failing is a reference to HAL from the 1968 film 2001: A Space Odyssey. Grampa also references All Quiet on the Western Front, when Moe says he "wrote the book on love". Moe's date, Betty, looks somewhat like Tress MacNeille, the actress who voiced her.

The Simpson Family Smile-Time Variety Hour is a parody of the 1960s and 1970s live variety shows. Mainly a parody of The Brady Bunch Hour, a short-lived spin-off of the 1970s sitcom The Brady Bunch, the replacement of Lisa in the third segment with another girl reflects the recasting of Jan Brady in the Brady Bunch Hour when Eve Plumb refused to participate. The Simpson family is made to look like The Partridge Family. Also, the segment holds numerous references to Laugh-In. Kent Brockman introduces the show from inside a broadcast booth in a style similar to Laugh-In, there is a joke wall similar to the one in Laugh-In where The Sea Captain opens a porthole. There is also a Laugh-In-like montage wherein other characters comment on the skit itself. When Hans Moleman reads a poem at the end of the segment and the episode itself, it is based on Henry Gibson reading a poem on Laugh-In. Other shows parodied during the variety show include The Sonny & Cher Comedy Hour, Saturday Night Live and The Smothers Brothers Comedy Hour.

The songs parodied during the third segment are:

- "I Want Candy" by The Strangeloves, performed by the Simpson family.
- "Peppermint Twist" by Joey Dee and the Starliters, performed by Bart, "Lisa" and Maggie.
- "Lollipop" by Ronald & Ruby, performed by Jasper Beardley.
- "Whip It" by Devo, performed by Waylon Smithers.

In the planned future for the show, Homer meets a green space alien named Ozmodiar that only he can see. This is a reference to The Great Gazoo, a character added into some of the final episodes of The Flintstones.

== Reception ==
In its original American broadcast, "The Simpsons Spin-Off Showcase" finished 61st place in the weekly ratings for the week of May 5–11, 1997 with a Nielsen rating of 7.3. It was the seventh-highest-rated show on the Fox network that week. Even though Troy mentions that The Simpsons, Melrose Place, and The X-Files are the only shows worth a slot in the next season's lineup, three other Fox shows actually did better than The Simpsons that week. These were Beverly Hills, 90210, King of the Hill, and Married... with Children. In Australia, the episode premiered on July 6, 1997, while in the UK it premiered on August 24, 1997.

Groening feared that fans would interpret the episode in a negative light and was uneasy about the episode when it was in production. He later went on to say that the episode "turned out great".

The writers of the book I Can't Believe It's a Bigger and Better Updated Unofficial Simpsons Guide Warren Martyn and Adrian Wood called it, "A very clever spin on the alternates offered by the Treehouse of Horrors run. Each of the spin-offs is very clever in its own way." It has also appeared as one of the favorite episodes on a number of "best of" lists. Entertainment Weekly placed the episode 19th in their top 25 Simpsons episode list.

In an interview for Star-News, writer Don Payne revealed that the episode was in his personal top six of the best The Simpsons episodes.

Additionally, The News Journal staff writer Gary Mullinax picked the episode as part of his top-ten list.

== Bibliography ==
- Alberti, John, ed. (2003). Leaving Springfield: 'The Simpsons' and the Possibility of Oppositional Culture. Wayne State University Press. ISBN 0-8143-2849-0.
- Groening, Matt (1997). Richmond, Ray; Coffman, Antonia (eds.). The Simpsons: A Complete Guide to Our Favorite Family (1st ed.). New York: HarperPerennial. ISBN 978-0-06-095252-5. LCCN 98141857. OCLC 37796735. OL 433519M.
