= Homer's Enemy =

- The Simpsons episode
- Frank Grimes (left) confronts Homer Simpson
- Episode no.: Season 8 Episode 23
- Directed by: Jim Reardon
- Written by: John Swartzwelder
- Production code: 4F19
- Original air date: May 4, 1997

Guest appearance
- Frank Welker as Executive Vice President dog

Episode features
- Couch gag: Bart turns lime green when he sits on the couch. Homer fixes the TV, only to make Bart appear red, and Homer slaps Bart on the head to make him appear in his regular way.
- Commentary: Matt Groening; Josh Weinstein; Hank Azaria; Jim Reardon

Episode chronology
← Previous "In Marge We Trust"	Next → "The Simpsons Spin-Off Showcase"
- The Simpsons season 8

"Homer's Enemy" is the twenty-third episode of the eighth season of the American animated television series The Simpsons. It was first broadcast on the Fox network in the United States on May 4, 1997. "Homer's Enemy" was directed by Jim Reardon and written by John Swartzwelder, based on an idea pitched by executive producer Bill Oakley.

In the episode, Frank Grimes is hired as a new employee at the Springfield Nuclear Power Plant. Despite Homer's attempts to befriend him, Grimes is provoked by Homer's laziness and incompetence. He declares that he and Homer are enemies, and tries to expose his flaws through public humiliation. In the subplot, Bart buys a run-down factory for a dollar. The episode explores the comic possibilities of a realistic character with a strong work ethic hired for a job where he has to work alongside a man like Homer.

Grimes was partially modeled after Michael Douglas's character in the film Falling Down, while Hank Azaria based aspects of his portrayal of the character on actor William H. Macy. Frank Welker guest stars as the voice of the dog whom Mr. Burns wants as his executive vice president. In its original broadcast on the Fox network, "Homer's Enemy" acquired a 7.7 Nielsen rating. It was viewed in approximately 7.5 million homes, finishing the week ranked 56th. "Homer's Enemy" is considered to be one of the darkest episodes of The Simpsons, and it split critical opinion. It is a favorite of several members of the production staff, including Swartzwelder, Bill Oakley, Josh Weinstein and Matt Groening, but it is one of the least favorites of Mike Reiss.

== Plot ==
After spending most of his life alone and working hard to make ends meet, Frank Grimes is hired at the Springfield Nuclear Power Plant after Mr. Burns learns of Grimes's hardship in a human-interest piece on the local news. Originally scouted to become the SNPP's Executive Vice-President, Grimes is assigned to Sector 7G after another local news story moves Burns to hire a heroic dog to the EVP position instead. In 7G, Grimes must work alongside Homer Simpson and his two friends Lenny and Carl, quickly becoming aghast at Homer's laziness and incompetence, particularly after learning that he is the plant's safety inspector.

When Grimes prevents Homer from accidentally drinking a flask of sulfuric acid by knocking it from his hands, Mr. Burns admonishes Grimes and reduces his salary, as the spilled acid destroyed a wall. A furious Grimes declares that he and Homer are now enemies. At Moe Szyslak's suggestion, Homer invites Grimes to his house for a lobster dinner, hoping to make amends. However, Grimes only grows more incensed by Homer's ability to live a comparatively more comfortable and successful life despite his sloth and ignorance, while Grimes has worked hard his entire life and has little to show for it. Denouncing Homer as a fraud, Grimes leaves angrily.

Meanwhile, after being dragged along to city hall by Marge for the purchase of a personalized license plate, Bart buys an abandoned factory for a dollar at a foreclosure auction. He and Milhouse spend their days wrecking the building until it collapses one night during Milhouse's watch, causing the rats in the building to swarm into Moe's Tavern.

Homer attempts to follow Marge's suggestion by acting as a model employee to impress Grimes, but his efforts fail as he is just as incompetent as before. Grimes rants to Lenny and Carl about Homer's obvious incompetence, but they insist that, despite his faults, Homer is a decent person. Unwilling to accept this, Grimes decides to prove Homer's lack of intelligence by tricking him into entering a children's contest to design a nuclear power plant in an attempt to humiliate him in front of everyone. Grimes's plan backfires when Homer's derivative model wins the contest and, when Homer's co-workers applaud rather than ridicule him, Grimes has a nervous breakdown and runs amok in the plant, mocking Homer's habits by imitating them. When Grimes gets carried away by grabbing hold of high-voltage wires without safety gloves, he is fatally electrocuted. At Grimes's funeral, Homer falls asleep and talks in his dream, making Reverend Lovejoy and the attendees laugh as Grimes's coffin is lowered into the earth.

== Production ==
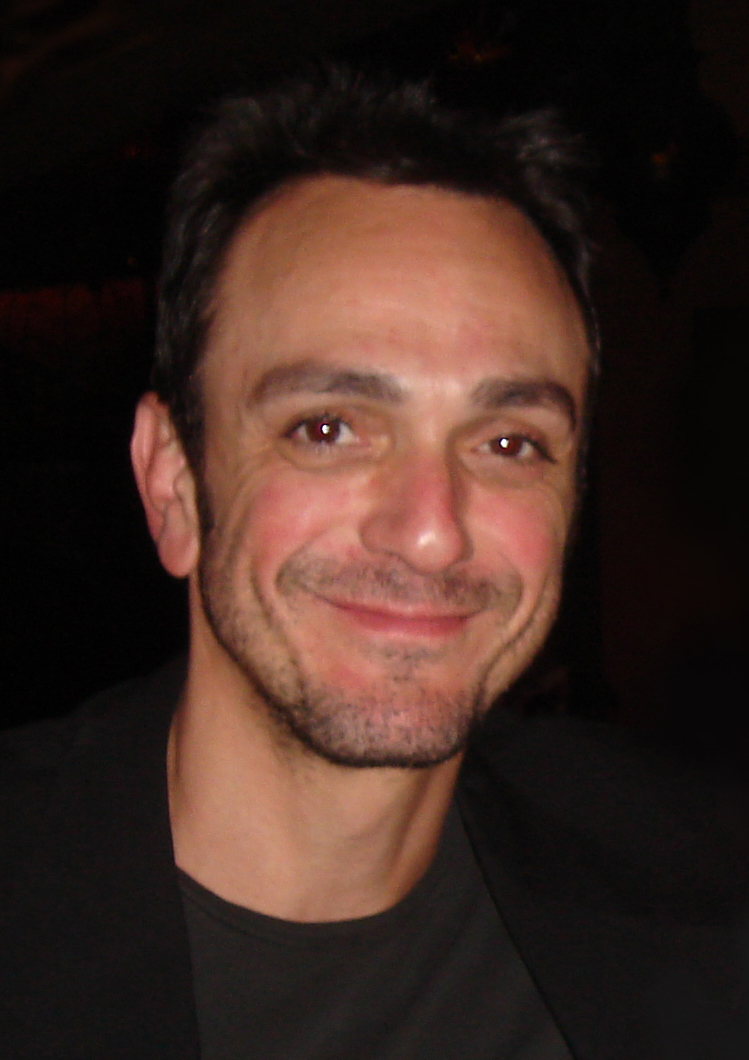
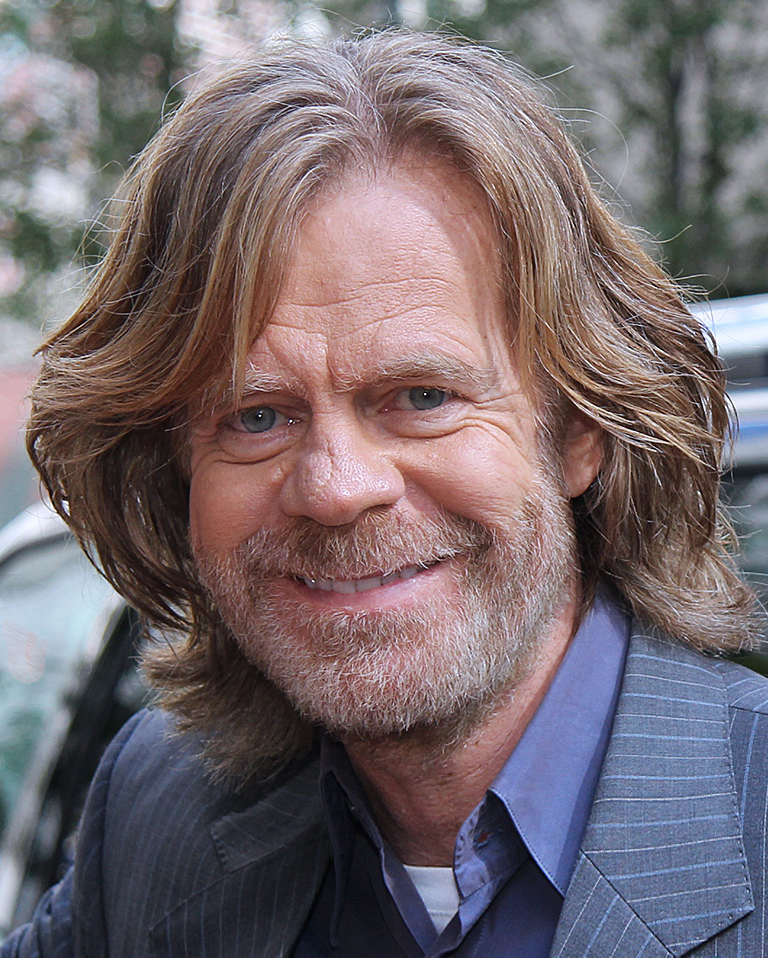
Voice actor Hank Azaria (above) based much of his performance as Frank Grimes on William H. Macy (below).

"Homer's Enemy" was written by John Swartzwelder, directed by Jim Reardon and executive produced by Bill Oakley and Josh Weinstein. One of the goals of Oakley and Weinstein was to create several episodes in each season that would "push the envelope conceptually." The idea for the episode was first conceived by Bill Oakley, who thought that Homer should have an enemy. The thought evolved into the concept of a "real world" co-worker who would either love or hate Homer. The writers chose the latter as they thought it would have funnier results.

"Homer's Enemy" explores the comic possibilities of a realistic character with a strong work ethic placed alongside Homer in a work environment. In an essay for the book Leaving Springfield, Robert Sloane describes the episode as "an incisive consideration of The Simpsons's world. Although The Simpsons is known for its self-reflectivity, the show had never looked at (or critiqued) itself as directly as it does in ['Homer's Enemy']." In the episode, Homer is portrayed as an everyman and the embodiment of the American spirit; however, in some scenes his negative characteristics and silliness are prominently highlighted. By the close of the episode, Grimes, a hard-working and persevering "real American hero," is relegated to the role of antagonist; the viewer is intended to be pleased that Homer has emerged victorious. In an interview with Simpsons fan site NoHomers.net, Josh Weinstein said:

We wanted to do an episode where the thinking was "What if a real life, normal person had to enter Homer's universe and deal with him?" I know this episode is controversial and divisive, but I just love it. It really feels like what would happen if a real, somewhat humorless human had to deal with Homer. There was some talk [on NoHomers.net] about the ending—we just did that because [(1)] it's really funny and shocking, (2) we like the lesson of "sometimes, you just can't win"—the whole Frank Grimes episode is a study in frustration and hence Homer has the last laugh and (3) we wanted to show that in real life, being Homer Simpson could be really dangerous and life threatening, as Frank Grimes sadly learned.

The animators and character designers had a lot of discussion about what Frank Grimes should look like. He was originally designed as a "burly ex-marine guy with a crew cut", but would later be modeled after Michael Douglas in the movie Falling Down and director Jim Reardon's college roommate. Hank Azaria provided the voice of Frank Grimes, even though such a role would normally have been performed by a guest star. Among few others, the producers considered asking Nicolas Cage to play Grimes but decided Azaria was more suitable because the role involved a great deal of frustration and required extensive knowledge of the show. Azaria felt that the role should instead go to William H. Macy. According to Azaria, "I based the character on William Macy. I can't really copy him vocally, but I tried to get as close as I could and copy his rhythms and the way he has that sort of seething passion underneath that total calm exterior." The producers worked a lot with Azaria to help him perfect the role, and gave him more guidance than they normally would. Azaria felt that it was the role on which he worked the hardest, adding "I think it's the one we did the most takes on, the most emotional, it felt like the one I worked on the hardest from a performance point of view, in preparation and in execution."

Josh Weinstein has expressed regret about killing off Grimes after only one episode, describing him as "such an amazing character." In an interview with The Believer, producer George Meyer said, "Grimes's cardinal sin was that he shined a light on Springfield. He pointed out everything that was wrongheaded and idiotic about that world. And the people who do that tend to become martyrs. He said things that needed to be said, but once they were said, we needed to destroy that person. I'll admit, we took a certain sadistic glee in his downfall. He was such a righteous person, and that somehow made his demise more satisfying." Lisa has few speaking lines in the episode, due to Yeardley Smith getting the flu after recording all of her lines in "In Marge We Trust", making this episode one of the four times Lisa has a minor role in a Season 8 episode, the others being "Bart After Dark", "Grade School Confidential", and "The Simpsons Spin-Off Showcase".

The subplot, where Bart buys a factory, was added so that there would be some lighter scenes to split up the main plot. According to Weinstein, "We wanted to have a Bart or Lisa kids' story to contrast the heaviness and reality of Frank Grimes."

== Reception ==
=== Ratings ===
In its original broadcast on the Fox network, "Homer's Enemy" acquired a 7.7 Nielsen rating. It was viewed in approximately 7.5 million homes, finishing the week ranked 56th. The Simpsons was the sixth-highest-rated show on Fox the week it was broadcast, behind The X-Files, a broadcast of the film The Mask, Melrose Place, King of the Hill and Beverly Hills, 90210. In Australia, the episode premiered on June 29, 1997, while in the UK it premiered on August 10, 1997. As of 2025, the episode holds an average rating of 9.3 (out of a possible 10) from user reviews on IMDb, the highest for the series.

=== Praise ===
Warren Martyn and Adrian Wood, authors of I Can't Believe It's a Bigger and Better Updated Unofficial Simpsons Guide, described the episode as "one of the series' darkest episodes [that] ends on a real downer but is nevertheless also one of the wittiest and cleverest in ages." Similarly, comedian Rick Mercer called it a "great episode, and one of the darkest ever produced."

Many critics have listed "Homer's Enemy" as one of the best episodes of the series, including John Orvted of Vanity Fair, Entertainment.ie, Screen Rant, The Guardian, and Time. IGN ranked Frank Grimes as number 17 on a list of "The Top 25 Simpsons Peripheral characters", making him the least-frequently shown character to appear in that list.

Several members of the staff have included the episode among their favorites. In a 2000 Entertainment Weekly article, Matt Groening ranked it as his sixth favorite Simpsons episode. It is also a personal favorite of Josh Weinstein, who cites the scene when Grimes visits the Simpson home as one of his favorite scenes, while The Office creator Ricky Gervais has called it "the most complete episode." In her autobiography My Life as a 10-Year-Old Boy, Nancy Cartwright, the voice of Bart, praises Azaria's performance as Grimes, and uses it as an example of how "Accent, pitch, pacing, range and intention" can allow an actor to voice many characters. She writes:

Sometimes [in voice acting], it isn't even a big change from your regular voice, but the attitude behind it makes all the difference. [...] We were going to have a guest star play Frank Grimes. [...] Hank, at the table-read, just filling in, created such a beautifully crafted character, beautifully psychotic, that no one was used to replace him.

In his only interview to date, John Swartzwelder listed the episode as among his favorites that he wrote. When asked about the dark ending, he replied "Grimey was asking for it the whole episode. He didn't approve of our Homer. He was asking for it, and he got it."

In August 2014, writing for The Verge, Chris Plante listed "Homer's Enemy" as one of his favorite episodes of The Simpsons, and Homer falling asleep and talking in his dream at Grimes's funeral as one of the funniest moments in the show, but he cited the latter as the moment the series jumped the shark, because of the impact it "has on the show's character [Homer], and through that character, the world."

In a roundtable discussion in The A.V. Club, Erik Adams says the episode "saves itself from its own cruelty, however. It's an expertly written Simpsons installment with a simple starting point—who could dislike Homer Simpson?—and a well-paced, hilarious, multiple-part answer to that question." Noel Murray writes:

There's an element of nose-thumbing to 'Homer's Enemy,' which may explain why it rubs some Simpsons fans the wrong way. But that defiant attitude is fairly exhilarating, too. The final injustice for Frank Grimes is that at his funeral, Reverend Lovejoy says that Frank liked to be called 'Grimey,' which he most definitely did not. That was just Homer's lazy nickname for him. It's another example of how everything falls into place around Homer, and how the only way to respond to that reality is either to laugh it off or to get yourself buried.

=== Criticism ===
According to Josh Weinstein, when the episode was first broadcast, many fans felt it was too dark, lacked humor and that Homer was portrayed as overly bad-mannered. Weinstein considers this episode one of the most controversial of the seasons he ran, as it involves sharp observational humor that he thinks many fans "didn't get." Weinstein also talks about a "generation gap"—he believes the episode was originally panned by viewers, but has since become a favorite among fans who grew up with the show.

Former Simpsons executive producer Mike Reiss listed "Homer's Enemy" as one of his two least favorite episodes, stating, "I just think the episode was in bad taste." Likewise, Jon Bonné of MSNBC used "Homer's Enemy" as an example of a bad episode of the eighth season and wrote "even now [in 2000], when subsequent episodes have debased Homer in new and innovative ways, the Grimes episode stands out as painful to watch."

== Legacy ==
Despite his minimal screen time in the series overall, Frank Grimes has since been referenced many times in the show, often showing his tombstone, and occasionally mentioning him by name. In "Natural Born Kissers", Homer finds a program from Frank's funeral and asks "Whatever happened to that guy?" In the season fourteen episode "The Great Louse Detective", it is revealed that he fathered a son named Frank Grimes Jr., who tries and fails to kill Homer. The footage of Grimes's death is also shown during the episode. He also appears in season twenty-six, as an angel with a halo in the opening sequence of "My Fare Lady", as Homer is exiting his work place. In the non-canon season twenty-eight episode "Treehouse of Horror XXVII", the ghost of Frank Grimes joins Sideshow Bob's army of the Simpsons' enemies.

During the nuclear power plant design contest, one of the entrants is Ralph Wiggum, whose entry is rejected by Mr. Burns. When Ralph does not leave the stage, Chief Wiggum says "Ralphie, get off the stage, sweetheart." This line was later used as the chorus in the song "Ralph Wiggum" by the Bloodhound Gang.

In February 2000, the cast of The Simpsons performed a live reading of the episode script at the US Comedy Arts Festival in Aspen, Colorado.

In an interview with GamesRadar+ in January 2023, Rick and Morty writer Jeff Loveness, who went to write the Marvel Cinematic Universe (MCU) feature film Ant-Man and the Wasp: Quantumania (2023), cited "Homer's Enemy" and the Frank Grimes character for inspiring the film's portrayal of Darren Cross / M.O.D.O.K., portrayed by Corey Stoll.
