= O C'mon All Ye Faithful =

- The Simpsons episode
- Promotional poster for the episodes
- Directed by: Debbie Bruce Mahan (Part 1); Matthew Faughnan (Part 2)
- Written by: Carolyn Omine
- Production codes: 35ABF21 (Part 1); 35ABF22 (Part 2)
- Original release date: December 17, 2024

Guest appearances
- Derren Brown as himself; Patti LaBelle as herself; Pentatonix as themselves

Episode chronology
← Previous "Homer and Her Sisters"	Next → "The Man Who Flew Too Much"
- The Simpsons season 36

"O C'mon All Ye Faithful", titled onscreen as "A Derren Brown Christmas", constitutes the first two specials of the thirty-sixth season of the American animated television series The Simpsons, comprising the 778th and 779th episodes overall. The episodes were the first to be released exclusively on the streaming service Disney+ and were released on December 17, 2024, between the ninth and tenth broadcast episodes on Fox. The episodes were written by Carolyn Omine and directed by Debbie Bruce Mahan and Matthew Faughnan.

In this episode, Derren Brown accidentally hypnotizes Homer into believing he is Santa Claus while Ned questions his faith in God. Illusionist Derren Brown, musician Patti LaBelle, and a cappella group Pentatonix appeared as themselves. The episode received positive reviews.

== Plot ==
Derren Brown comes to Springfield to film a Christmas special where he secretly tries to raise the Christmas spirit of the disillusioned townsfolk. Marge allows Brown to hypnotize Homer to become a better gift buyer. He traps Homer as he buys cupcakes from a vending machine. Brown holds the cupcake package to his forehead to attract his attention, but Homer is hypnotized to believe he is the Santa Claus on the package. The town joins him in the delusion with Ralph becoming his elf. At a town meeting, Brown reveals his true purpose and fixes Homer. When the people tell him to fix them, he says they were not hypnotized but were exhibiting cult-like behavior to believe in a magical being. Hearing this, Flanders questions his belief in God.

Flanders tells Marge that he has been questioning why God would take two wives from him. Marge tells him to continue to have faith. The next day, Flanders puts away his religious objects at home. Marge gets worried while Bart tells Lisa he is not feeling the Christmas spirit. Lisa tells him that as he grows up, it becomes more about giving than receiving. Marge asks Brown to hypnotize Ned into believing in God, but he declines. Later, Bart tries to scare Ned into believing in God. Marge exposes him but is touched by his intentions. Meanwhile, Homer is feeling depressed now that he is not Santa, so he makes presents with Ralph to give to the townsfolk.

Homer is caught breaking into Rainier Wolfcastle's home to deliver his present and is sent to jail. Ralph breaks him out, and Homer decides to only give presents to his family. Meanwhile, Marge checks on Ned, and Lisa tells him a story about an ox yoke floating in the ocean and a sea turtle that miraculously surfaces to breathe in the middle of the yoke. Ned wanders the town, and Professor Frink invites him on a ride in his submarine. Under the ocean, Ned is moved by the creatures he sees. When the submarine cannot withstand the water pressure, the submarine explodes. Ned surfaces in the middle of a floating ox yoke, restoring his faith in God. He meets his kids and the Simpsons at the dock. After Ned leaves, Brown reveals that the submarine encounter was a ploy by him to help Ned, however the ox yoke was not part of it. Homer, intending to give Brown an Applebee's gift card, mixes up the boxes and gives Brown a blue hair bow. Brown believes that that bow was from his old ventriloquist dummy, Chaucer, which has gone missing. Moved by the gesture, Brown hugs Homer, believing that he is Santa, and departs. The Simpsons go home where Homer gives Marge a book of "Sexy Sudokus" and Maggie is shown with the Applebee's gift card.

== Production ==
=== Development ===
In August 2024, it was announced that four original episodes of the series would be released exclusively on Disney+. These two episodes were released to coincide with the 35th anniversary of the series premiere. Executive producer Matt Selman described them as a double-length episode with no cliffhanger to separate the two parts, which was unlike previous two-part episodes. Writer Carolyn Omine said the release on Disney+ allowed for the episode "to breathe" without the time constraints of broadcast television while not sacrificing the budget for the episode. It also allowed producers not to create climactic moments where the episode would pause for commercial breaks.

The producers decided to create a Christmas episode for their first Disney+ episode because Fox preferred not to have holiday episodes other than ones for Halloween because they were not popular in reruns. Omine said the episode was inspired by "the difficult year she experienced personally" and wanting to find "magic in the world". Omine originally planned not to write an episode due to those difficulties, but because of the 2023 Hollywood labor disputes causing delays in the production schedule, she pitched a story that was "something uplifting and sort of soul nourishing". The idea of Flanders considering God's existence is based on Omine's experience when she first considered that God may not exist. To return Flanders' faith, Omine tried to write a story where Reverend Lovejoy talked to him but was not sure he belonged in the story. Her solution was based on a story she heard on the radio of a woman who was moved by seeing the life forms in the ocean. Originally, Brown was also responsible for the yoke through which Flanders surfaces, but after hearing the reaction to the story from a friend, Omine changed it so "there is some magic."

When it was decided to release the episode on the 35th anniversary of the series premiere, several references to the first episode were added. The Christmas tree in the Simpson house only has a birdhouse as an ornament, and the episode ends with a Christmas card freeze frame. Several references were also included from previous Christmas episodes such as Funzo and the astrolabe.

=== Casting ===
Illusionist Derren Brown appeared as himself. He described the role as "the best thing that's happened in my life so far". Omine said it was "one of the largest guest starring roles we've ever had" in terms of lines spoken and time on screen. During her difficult 2023, Omine watched videos of Brown on YouTube and thought his shows were "very entertaining and light-hearted, but there was always something sort of deeper, underneath it." Omine wrote the episode with Brown already included before sending the script to him to ask for his participation. After agreeing, Omine recorded his part in London.

Musician Patti LaBelle sings a version of "Silent Night" with non-faith denominational parody lyrics. Omine wanted someone who could sing in a way that was similar to the Mahalia Jackson Christmas album she heard growing up. A cappella group Pentatonix is heard singing a version of "God Rest Ye Merry, Gentlemen", also with parody lyrics. The group also sang the words "The Simpsons" in the opening title card of the episode, which they requested.

This was the final episode by production order for actress Pamela Hayden, who voiced Milhouse and Rod in the episode. Hayden would continue to act two more Disney+ episodes as part of this season.

=== Promotion ===
The trailer for the episode was released on December 11, 2024.

== Release ==
The world premiere for the episode was held at the El Capitan Theatre in Los Angeles on December 13, 2024. The episode was released on the streaming service Disney+ on December 17, 2024.

== Reception ==
Rafael Motamayor of IGN gave the episode an 8 out of 10. He called it "the best Ned Flanders story in decades" and said "the connected stories of Homer and Ned finding meaning in the holiday and in life that makes this a touching Christmas special."

John Schwarz of Bubbleblabber gave the episode a 9 out of 10. He said the episode proved that writer Carolyn Omine was at least one of the top ten writers in the series' history and that the parts by the two directors worked well together. He highlighted the performance by Derren Brown, and thought the story was "one that was well fleshed out and still respectful". He also noted that Simpsons two-part episodes tended to focus on religion and Flanders.

Ben Gibbons of Screen Rant gave the episode a 9 out of 10. He said it was a "wonderful episode filled with all the humor that makes the show great" and liked the use of Derren Brown.

Mike Celestino of Laughing Place liked the message about faith and its meaning at Christmas. He highlighted the performance of Harry Shearer as Flanders.
