= Little Orphan Millie =

- The Simpsons episode
- Episode no.: Season 19; Episode 6
- Directed by: Lance Kramer
- Written by: Mick Kelly
- Production code: JABF22
- Original air date: November 11, 2007

Episode features
- Chalkboard gag: "There is no such thing as an iPoddy"
- Couch gag: The family appears on the cover of Modern Couch Gag magazine.
- Commentary: Al Jean; Matt Selman; J. Stewart Burns; Mick Kelly; Tom Gammill; Max Pross; Lance Kramer

Episode chronology
← Previous "Treehouse of Horror XVIII"	Next → "Husbands and Knives"
- The Simpsons season 19

"Little Orphan Millie" is the sixth episode of the nineteenth season of the American animated television series The Simpsons. It first aired on the Fox network in the United States on November 11, 2007. This episode represents a milestone in Simpsons' history as it sees Kirk and Luann remarry after initially divorcing eleven seasons earlier in the episode "A Milhouse Divided". It was written by Mick Kelly, production assistant to Al Jean, and directed by Lance Kramer.

During its first broadcast, the episode garnered 10.57 million viewers.

== Plot ==
Kirk and Luann tell The Simpsons they are going to be remarried, much to the delight of Milhouse. While preparing for the wedding, Marge suggests to Homer that he match his tie to her eyes, to which he casually replies that he never notices petty details like eye color. Shocked, Marge covers her eyes so Homer cannot see them unless he remembers their color. While the Van Houtens are on their cruise honeymoon, Kirk carries Luann down the hallway to their private room. The boat begins swinging from side to side, and the two fall off the boat. Two of the cruise representatives tell Milhouse his parents are lost at sea and presumed deceased, throwing Milhouse even deeper into depression. As he sulks around the Simpsons' house, he is informed the search has stopped. After sucking upon Maggie's bottle, he discovers he truly is the "world's oldest baby", and promises himself that he will soon become a true man. Meanwhile, Homer continues making fruitless attempts at looking for traces of hints that can help him discover the color of Marge's eyes.

Milhouse starts to behave depressingly, and dresses in a black jacket and jeans. Milhouse's new behavior and attitude (gloomy, mellow, and poetic) grabs the attention of the girls at school, including Lisa. Milhouse starts usurping Bart's popularity, which aggravates Bart. After concluding that Milhouse with family would be happy again, Bart remembers that Milhouse gets Danish butter cookies every Christmas from Solvang, California. He decides to connect Milhouse with his Danish uncle, Norbert van Houten. Waiting at the airport, Uncle Norbert, dressed like Indiana Jones (including hat and bullwhip) arrives by his own biplane and asks to be referred to as "Zack," the proud Danish Van Houten with a hatred towards the Dutch Van Houtens. After Zack arrives to get Milhouse from the school, Milhouse's popularity escalates even higher.

Feeling desperate about finding Marge's eye color, Homer remembers a song he used to sing to Marge, and remembers every word except when he sings about her eyes, searching in vain for the missing word that rhymes with such lyrics as "appraisal". Marge remembers the song and, touched, removes her sun glasses, revealing the eyes that Homer's song called "a beautiful, deep shade of hazel." An angry Bart soon discovers Milhouse plans to fly away in a hot air balloon with Zack. After being convinced by Lisa, Bart realizes that he platonically loves and will miss Milhouse. Milhouse, Zack, and Bart take off in the hot air balloon and come upon an island, where a very much alive Kirk and Luann plan escaping with a nature-made hang-glider. After flying, Kirk and Luann's hang-glider cuts the hot air balloon and soon, Milhouse re-unites with his parents. Zack states that he has already called for help and then gets into a fight with Kirk over their heritage (Danish and Dutch respectively).

== Cultural references ==
The episode's name references Little Orphan Annie. Milhouse's uncle Zack resembles Indiana Jones and when he flies Milhouse home, music similar to "The Raiders March" from the Indiana Jones film Raiders of the Lost Ark is heard. Milhouse's somber ensemble is similar to James Dean in Rebel Without a Cause. "Adagio for Strings" is played during the dark and gloomy scene showing the cruise line representatives driving toward the Simpsons' house. The scene itself is a parody of a scene from Saving Private Ryan, where Mrs. Ryan is informed of the death of her sons. The name "Festival Cruise Lines" is a parody of Carnival Cruise Lines. The "Solvang Air" liner plane is a wooden and scantling-work structure with wind-mill wings as propellers, and Uncle Zak and Milhouse's father end by reviving an old hatred between Dutch and Danish. The wooden plane's landing is accompanied with music from "Swedish Rhapsody No. 1" by Swedish composer Hugo Alfvén. Bart and Marge both use the term Krumping in reference to an energetic dancing style that was popularized in the United States.

== Reception ==
The episode originally garnered 10.6 million viewers on its first run, that being the third highest of the season.

Robert Canning of IGN stated that overall, "'Little Orphan Millie' was a middle-of-the-road episode that will never really stand out."

Richard Keller of TV Squad said "For the most part the episode was entertaining and fairly free of over-the-top sight gags"

The scene in the episode where Marge tries to cheer up Bart by attempting to krump—albeit unsuccessfully—later became an Internet meme.
