= Homer vs. Lisa and the 8th Commandment =

- The Simpsons episode
- Lisa hallucinates what Hell is like because she fears her family is violating the Eighth Commandment ("thou shalt not steal") by watching stolen cable television.
- Episode no.: Season 2 Episode 13
- Directed by: Rich Moore
- Written by: Steve Pepoon
- Production code: 7F13
- Original air date: February 7, 1991

Guest appearances
- Phil Hartman as Troy McClure, Moses, and the Cable Guy

Episode features
- Chalkboard gag: "I will not make flatulent noises in class"
- Couch gag: The family dances before sitting on the couch.
- Commentary: Matt Groening; Al Jean; Mike Reiss; Rich Moore; Steve Pepoon

Episode chronology
← Previous "The Way We Was"	Next → "Principal Charming"
- The Simpsons season 2

"Homer vs. Lisa and the 8th Commandment" is the thirteenth episode of the second season of the American animated television series The Simpsons. The 26th episode of the series overall, it originally aired on Fox in the United States on February 7, 1991. In the episode, Homer gets an illegal cable hookup. Despite the family's enjoyment of the new channels, Lisa suspects they are stealing cable. Her suspicions are confirmed by Reverend Lovejoy and she protests her family's breaking of the 8th Commandment ("thou shalt not steal") by no longer watching television. Homer invites his friends to watch a cable-TV boxing match, but Lisa's protest persuades him to cut the cable when the fight ends.

The episode was written by freelance writer Steve Pepoon and directed by Rich Moore. It is based on the Eighth Commandment ("Thou shalt not steal"). The episode marks the debut of Troy McClure, who was voiced by Phil Hartman and based on the typical "washed up" Hollywood actor. The character Drederick Tatum, one of the boxers in the boxing match Homer and his friends watch, also makes his first appearance on the show in this episode.

In its original broadcast, "Homer vs. Lisa and the 8th Commandment" received a Nielsen rating of 15.2, finishing 25th the week it aired.

It received favorable reviews from critics and became the second episode of The Simpsons to win the Primetime Emmy Award for Outstanding Animated Program (For Programming less than One Hour).

== Plot ==
After seeing Ned Flanders reject an offer from a crooked cable man for a $50 illegal cable hookup, Homer chases after the cable man and takes the offer. The Simpsons like the new channels and spend hours watching them. However, Lisa is suspicious about the cable hookup, and after a Sunday school lesson about the existence and nature of Hell, she fears that Homer is violating the Eighth of the Ten Commandments—"Thou shalt not steal"—and will go to Hell when he dies.

After seeing other examples of common thievery everywhere, Lisa visits Reverend Lovejoy. He dissuades Lisa from reporting her father's illegal cable hookup to the police since the Fifth Commandment states one must "honor thy father and thy mother", but instead advises her to lead by example and refuse to watch programs via the cable hookup. Marge pleads with Homer to either disconnect the cable or pay for it, but he refuses. However, after the cable man offers to sell him a stolen car stereo and attempts to break into Ned's house, Homer barricades his windows in fear. Bart one evening discovers a porn channel called "Top Hat Entertainment", despite fear of punishment from Homer, who spots him watching it. Homer lets Bart off with a warning, telling him not to watch that channel again. Bart pretends to agree to this and behind Homer's back charges the neighborhood children 50 cents to watch the cable porn channel, but just as it begins Homer catches him and sends him to his room as punishment.

Homer invites his co-workers and bar buddies to watch Drederick Tatum fight for the World Heavyweight Championship during a cable-TV boxing match. Unfortunately for Homer, Mr. Burns also finds out and decides to attend the gathering to watch the match. Whilst preparing for the viewing party, Homer is forced to hastily hide items he stole from some of his guests, namely office supplies from the Springfield Nuclear Power Plant and beer mugs from Moe's. When Lisa announces she will boycott the screening, Homer banishes her to the lawn, where she is joined by Marge and Maggie. Eventually Homer's conscience bothers him and he begrudgingly chooses not to watch the fight, dragging Bart outside with him. When his friends leave, Homer hesitantly cuts the cable hookup over Bart's objections. However, he ends up cutting off power to his neighborhood while trying to find the right wire to cut the cable.

== Production ==
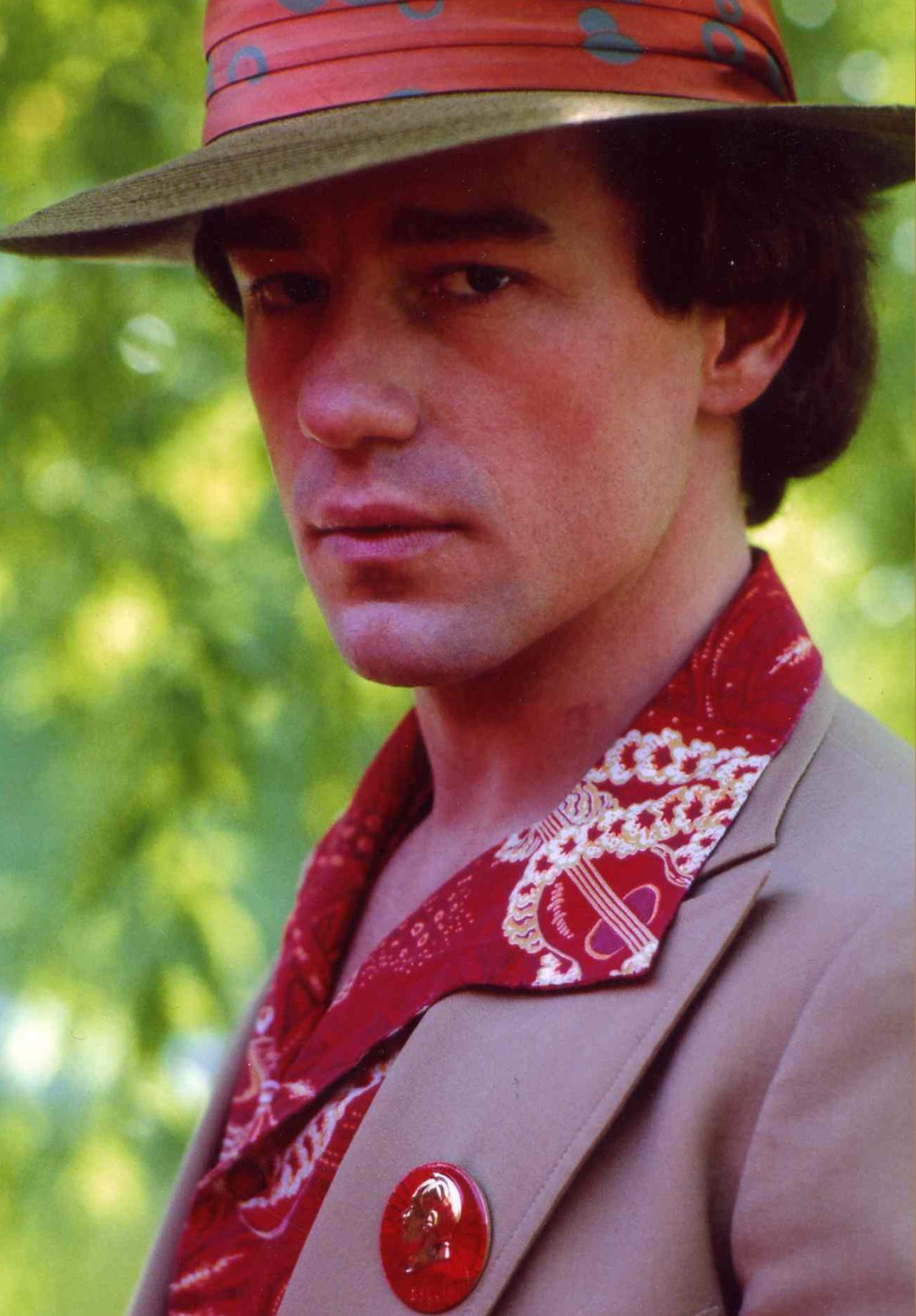
This was the first episode in which Phil Hartman voiced Troy McClure.

"Homer vs. Lisa and the 8th Commandment" was written by freelance writer Steve Pepoon and directed by Rich Moore. It was originally going to be named "Homer vs. the 8th Commandment", but the writers decided to include Lisa in the title because they wanted the cast to feel as if all their characters were equally represented on the show. The episode is based on the Eighth Commandment ("thou shall not steal"), which is one of the Ten Commandments. The Simpsons writer Al Jean said that "whenever people come up to me and say that The Simpsons is just sort of this outrageous show that has no moral center, I always point them to this [episode], where Homer gets an illegal cable hook-up (which many people have done in real life) and suffers enormous consequences."

The Simpsons writer Mike Reiss feels that episodes such as "Homer vs. Lisa and the 8th Commandment" are his favorite episodes to write because they have a "solid theme or an issue" (in this case, religion and theft), that one can "discuss endlessly and just have it present itself in so many different ways". Producer Jeff Martin said the writers tried to use a "very strict construction of the Eighth Commandment," considering cable theft to be "essentially a victimless crime". "Homer vs. the 8th Commandment" was produced at a time when illegal cable hookups were becoming commonplace in many homes. This episode later inspired the season four episode "Homer the Heretic", in which Homer stops going to church on Sundays. Based on the Fourth Commandment, "remember the Sabbath and keep it holy", that episode originated when Jean commented to Reiss, "We had a lot of luck with Homer stealing cable, so maybe we could look to other commandments?"

The episode marks the debut appearance of the character Troy McClure, voiced by Phil Hartman. McClure was based on the typical "washed-up" Hollywood actor, and B movie actors Troy Donahue and Doug McClure served as inspiration for his name and certain character aspects. According to show creator Matt Groening, Hartman was cast in the role due to his ability to pull "the maximum amount of humor" out of any line he was given. McClure's visual appearance is similar to that of Hartman himself. McClure became a recurring character on the show after "Homer vs. Lisa and the 8th Commandment", but was retired in 1998 after Hartman's death. In addition to McClure, Hartman also provided the voice of the cable guy. The character Drederick Tatum, one of the boxers in the boxing match Homer and his friends watch, also makes his first appearance on the show in this episode. His physical appearance was based on the American boxer Mike Tyson, and he was named after a real boxer Simpsons writer George Meyer had seen.

== Cultural references ==
The opening scene with Moses on Mount Sinai parodies the 1956 film The Ten Commandments. The scene in which Homer fakes getting hit by the cable man's truck resembles a scene in Alfred Hitchcock's film North by Northwest. In a joke about Mr. Burns' age, Burns recalls watching a bare-knuckle match between Gentleman Jim Corbett and "an Eskimo fellow". The films that are watched by the family on the new cable are Jaws, Die Hard, and Wall Street. One of the X-rated films Bart and his friends watch on cable is called Broadcast Nudes. The title parodies Broadcast News, which was written by Simpsons executive producer James L. Brooks. Towards the end of the episode, Bart mentions Atlanta Braves Baseball in reference to their frequent appearances on TBS from 1977 to 2007. He also mentions Joe Franklin.

== Reception ==
In its original broadcast, "Homer vs. Lisa and the 8th Commandment" finished 25th in ratings for the week of February 4–10, 1991 with a Nielsen rating of 15.2, and was viewed in approximately 14 million homes. It did better than the show's season average rank of 32nd, and was the highest-rated program on Fox that week. The episode finished second in its timeslot to The Cosby Show, which aired at the same time on NBC and had a Nielsen rating of 16.8.

In The Gospel According to The Simpsons, Mark I. Pinsky writes that the episode has "the structure of an exquisitely crafted twenty-two-minute sermon". DVD Movie Guide's Colin Jacobson felt that "[The episode] helped establish the show's reputation as a master lampooner of pop culture. The introduction of cable into the home allowed [the writers] to mock many different movies and other media outlets, and this helped make the episode very entertaining. It also worked in many other ways and offered a fine show."

Writing for Maclean's magazine, Jaime J. Weinman described "Homer vs. Lisa and the Eighth Commandment" as "the first truly great episode—the one that established The Simpsons as the funniest and most multi-layered sitcom around. The story of Homer stealing cable was an excuse for dozens of parodies of early '90s cable TV, but it was also a story about Homer and his daughter and an examination of how we rationalize little acts of theft in our daily lives."

The authors of the book I Can't Believe It's a Bigger and Better Updated Unofficial Simpsons Guide, Gary Russell and Gareth Roberts, called the episode a "skilful demonstration of a moral dilemma that must have plagued millions since the inception of cable TV". Doug Pratt, a DVD reviewer and Rolling Stone contributor, wrote that "Homer vs. Lisa and the 8th Commandment" is "one of the many demonstrations that while [The Simpsons] may have pushed the censorship envelope for its day, it remained moral to its core. The running satire of cable programs is also quite amusing." The episode won the Primetime Emmy Award for Outstanding Animated Program (For Programming less than One Hour). It was the second episode of the show to win the award. It was also nominated in the "Outstanding Sound Mixing for a Comedy Series or a Special" category.
