= Steve Pepoon =

American television writer (1956–2025)

- Born: May 19, 1956; Kansas City, Missouri, U.S.
- Died: May 3, 2025 (aged 68); Paola, Kansas, U.S.
- Occupation: Television writer

Stephen Robert Pepoon (May 19, 1956 – May 3, 2025) was an American television writer who wrote for The Simpsons, ALF, and Get a Life. He was also the co-creator of The Wild Thornberrys.

== Life and career ==
Pepoon was born in Kansas City, Missouri on May 19, 1956. He grew up in Paola, Kansas, and graduated from Kansas State University. He moved to Los Angeles and managed drive-in movie theaters. Pepoon's The Simpsons episode "Homer vs. Lisa and the 8th Commandment" won the Primetime Emmy Award for Outstanding Animated Program at the 43rd Primetime Emmy Awards.

Pepoon died in Paola, Kansas on May 3, 2025, at the age of 68.

== Filmography ==
Writer

- Silver Spoons (1 episode, 1986)
- ALF (14 episodes, 1987–1990)
- It's Garry Shandling's Show (1 episode, 1990)
- Get a Life (1990)
- Ferris Bueller (3 episodes, 1990)
- The Simpsons (1 episode, 1991)
  - "Homer vs. Lisa and the 8th Commandment" (1991)
- The Jackie Thomas Show (1992)
- Roseanne (1 episode, 1994)
- Cleghorne! (1 episode, 1995)
- You Wish (1997)
- The Wild Thornberrys Movie (2002)
- The Wild Thornberrys (2 episodes, 2001–2003)

Producer

- Roseanne (15 episodes, 1993–1994)
- Cleghorne! (15 episodes, 1995)
- Teen Angel (1 episode, 1998)
- The PJs (3 episodes, 2000)

== Awards and nominations ==
- 1991, won Emmy Award for 'Outstanding Animated Program' for The Simpsons
