= Opie the Birdman =

- The Andy Griffith Show episode
- Episode no.: Season 4 Episode 1
- Directed by: Dick Crenna
- Written by: Harvey Bullock
- Original air date: September 10, 1963
- Running time: 30 minutes

"Opie the Birdman" is the first episode of the fourth season of The Andy Griffith Show. It aired on CBS on September 9, 1963. In the episode, Opie accidentally kills a mother songbird and bears the responsibility of rearing her three young birds.

The episode was #24 in TV Guide's "Top 100 Episodes of All Time" 1997 list, and moved up to #18 when the list was revised in 2009.

== Plot ==
Barney makes an old-fashioned slingshot for Opie. Looking on, Andy tells him to be careful with it. When Barney demonstrates one of his trick shots, he breaks a window in a bookcase, prompting Andy to remind Opie to never shoot it indoors.

Playing outside, Opie is pretending to shoot at various targets with his new toy. Seeing something in the tree in his front yard, he aims and shoots and kills a bird, which falls to the ground in front of him. Opie refuses to believe the bird is dead and pleads for it to fly away. When he realizes what he has done, he runs to his room, sobbing.

At the dinner table that evening, Opie is melancholy, barely touching his meal. Andy comments to Aunt Bee that he found a dead songbird in the yard and that he believes the neighbor's cat is responsible. Aunt Bee tells him it can't be the cat because their neighbor, Mrs. Snyder, has been away for over a week and she took her cat with her. Opie leaves the table and rushes to his room.

It is easy for Andy to recognize what has happened and he confronts Opie about it. Opie admits his mistake and says that he is sorry, but Andy tells him that being sorry is not enough. He opens Opie's bedroom window where he can hear the baby birds calling for their mother, who will never return.

In the morning, Opie has decided that he will take care of the baby birds, and begins by feeding them breakfast. When Mrs. Snyder has returned with her cat, Andy moves the birds to a cage on the front porch. When Opie names the birds, Andy reminds him that someday they will grow up and he will have to release them.

When the birds have grown big enough to be released, Andy tells Opie that their mother would have set them free, and Opie acknowledges that he must release them. After this, Opie comments that the cage looks empty, to which Andy replies, "But don't the trees seem nice and full?"

== Cast ==
- Andy Griffith as Andy Taylor
- Ron Howard as Opie Taylor
- Don Knotts as Barney Fife
- Frances Bavier as Aunt Bee

== Reception ==
The episode was #24 in TV Guide's "Top 100 Episodes of All Time" 1997 list, and moved up to #18 when the list was revised in 2009.

The episode is regarded by critics as one of the show's best episodes. In The Platinum Age of Television, American TV critic David Bianculli wrote that it is the show's best episode, noting that it displays a firm yet thoughtful parenting style at a time when corporal punishment was common. Saul Austerlitz cites this episode as a specific example in describing The Andy Griffith Show as groundbreaking in its balance of poignancy and dramatic subplots. It is listed as one of the top twenty all-time favorite episodes in The Andy Griffith Show Book.
