= Reverend Lovejoy =

Fictional character from The Simpsons franchise

- The Simpsons character
- First appearance: "The Telltale Head"; February 25, 1990
- Created by: Matt Groening
- Designed by: Matt Groening
- Voiced by: Harry Shearer

In-universe information
- Full name: Timothy Goren Lovejoy Jr.
- Gender: Male
- Occupation: Minister of the First Church of Springfield
- Spouse: Helen Lovejoy (wife)
- Children: Jessica Lovejoy (daughter)
- Religion: Protestantism

Reverend Timothy Goren "Tim" Lovejoy, Jr. is a recurring character in the animated television series The Simpsons. He is voiced by Harry Shearer, and first appeared in the episode "The Telltale Head".

Rev. Lovejoy is the minister at the First Church of Springfield, the main church shown throughout the series. The church is part of a fictitious branch of Protestantism called "Presbylutheranism" (an apparent portmanteau of Presbyterianism and Lutheranism). Initially kind-hearted and ambitious, Lovejoy has become somewhat bitter and apathetic towards other people and religion because of Ned Flanders's chronic, over-the-top scrupulosity.

== Role in The Simpsons ==
=== Profile ===
Lovejoy is the pastor of the Western Branch of American Reform Presbylutheranism First Church of Springfield, which most of the show's characters regularly attend. He attended Texas Christian University. He initially came to Springfield in the 1970s as an eager, enthusiastic, young man, only to become cynical and disillusioned about his ministry, mostly due to Ned Flanders, who constantly pesters him with minor issues such as "coveting his own wife" or thinking that he "swallowed a toothpick".

Lovejoy would deal with Flanders' concerns very briefly, so that he could return to playing with his model trains. At one point, Lovejoy "just stopped caring", but rediscovered the joy of helping others, though Ned still irritates him. Lovejoy even suggests Ned join another religion, as he believes that "they are all pretty much the same". In the season two episode "Homer vs. Lisa and the 8th Commandment", Lovejoy helps Lisa with her family's illegal cable hookup.

His sermons vary between dreary recitations of more opaque parts of the Old Testament, to the occasional "fire and brimstone" about Hell. He disapproves of popular music, as shown in "Bart Sells His Soul" when Bart gets the congregation to sing "In-A-Gadda-Da-Vida" as an opening hymn; he punishes Bart for the prank by making him clean the organ pipes that he has "befouled".

=== Acceptance for other religions ===
Lovejoy demonstrates his acceptance for Hinduism when he performs a Hindu marriage ceremony for Kwik-E-Mart shopkeeper Apu (though Lovejoy does not know much about the faith, referring to it in an earlier episode as "Miscellaneous"), co-hosts a religious radio program with Krusty the Klown's rabbi father, and admits evolution may be true. However, he does not tolerate Buddhism, as when Lisa Simpson converted to it, he referred to her as "Marge Simpson's devil-daughter". He also appears bitter about the tall Episcopal church across the street, wanting to build a larger steeple, and when mentioning the other church, placing the emphasis on "pis". He maintains two rolodexes – one for Christians, and one for non-Christians. While he seems to have originally accepted evolution, he later advocates for creationism at his church to beef up its membership.

He does not accept Roman Catholicism either, as he is shown brawling with a priest. He tells Marge that he might as well do a Voodoo dance for Abe Simpson when asked to give him the last rites. He also helps kidnap Bart to keep him from converting to Catholicism. Lovejoy also claims in "There's Something About Marrying" to various same-sex couples who arrive at his church to get married that "while I have no opinion for or against your sinful lifestyle, I cannot marry two people of the same sex anymore than I could put a hamburger on a hot dog bun" and tells them to "go back to behind the scenes of every facade of entertainment." When Marge objects, Lovejoy tells her the Bible forbids same-sex relationships, but when Marge asks which book in Bible forbids it, he merely claims "The Bible" and then continuously rings the church bell after Marge continues to press him on the matter.

=== Negative qualities ===
Lovejoy has been shown to do things that would be considered sinful. Lovejoy has been known to exploit his congregation for money, brawl with a Roman Catholic priest, encourage his pet Old English Sheepdog to foul Ned Flanders's lawn, and implied that he once burned down his church for insurance money. In "Whacking Day", he made up a passage in the Bible to attempt to convince Lisa that "even God himself endorses Whacking Day". In "The Joy of Sect", the episode in which the whole town of Springfield is deceived into joining a cult, Lovejoy kidnaps Homer with Groundskeeper Willie from the cult and hits him across the head numerous times hoping to knock him out. Also, when Lovejoy sees the spaceship emerge from the "forbidden barn" he throws his religious collar on the ground. After it is revealed that the spaceship is fake, Ned Flanders notices his collar on the ground and informs Lovejoy, who picks it up and puts it back on.

Lovejoy is not always enthusiastic about the Bible, calling it a "2000-page sleeping pill". It is unsure if he even owns a Bible, as it was once said he borrows one from the library every week. Sometimes he holds strange positions on the Bible and makes theological errors. In "Secrets of a Successful Marriage," an episode that dealt with marriage counseling, Lovejoy and his gossipy wife, Helen, both recommend that Marge should divorce Homer. Marge objects to this, pointing out how the Bible has strict guidelines against things like divorce, but Lovejoy claims, "Marge, everything is a sin. (holds up the Bible) Have you ever sat down and read this thing? Technically, we're not allowed to go to the bathroom." However, despite these opinions, he is still deeply knowledgeable about the Bible, being able to recite a random passage (Matthew 21:17, "And he left them and went out into the city of Bethany and he lodged there") purely from memory after Homer mentioned its number during a debate.

=== Family ===
Lovejoy's wife Helen was originally portrayed as a moralistic, judgmental gossip, but in voice actress Maggie Roswell's long absence, her character was seen but not heard. The Lovejoys' manipulative daughter Jessica was the focus of the episode "Bart's Girlfriend" where she was voiced by guest star Meryl Streep, but is otherwise rarely seen. Lovejoy's father is briefly shown in the episode "Bart After Dark" as an older version of Lovejoy (including clerical collar) who visits the Maison Derrière.

== Creation and reception ==
Matt Groening has indicated that Lovejoy is named after Lovejoy Street (which in turn is named for Portland co-founder Asa Lovejoy) in Portland, Oregon, the city where Groening grew up. When the character was created, producer Sam Simon did not want Lovejoy to be a "cartoony hypocritical preacher" but rather "a realistic person who just happened to work as a minister," as recalled by writer Al Jean. By season eight, the show had begun to explore secondary characters with Lovejoy being the central character in the episode "In Marge We Trust" because, aside from being noted as "the pastor who didn't care", he had not had much character development. Author Mark I. Pinsky writes of Lovejoy as "a foil in the series, personifying many of the failings of organized religion and Christian conservatism," and yet still a real human with faults and not simply evil. Harry Shearer has stated that his voice for the character is based on Ernest Angley.
