= Milhouse Van Houten =

Fictional character from The Simpsons franchise

- The Simpsons character
- First appearance: "The Butterfinger Group" (1988)
- Created by: Matt Groening
- Designed by: Matt Groening
- Voiced by: Pamela Hayden (1988–2025); Kelly Macleod (2025–present); Hank Azaria ("Hardly Kirk-ing")

In-universe information
- Full name: Milhouse Mussolini Van Houten
- Gender: Male
- Occupation: Student at Springfield Elementary School
- Family: Kirk Van Houten (father); Luann Van Houten (mother)
- Relatives: Jeremy Van Houten (paternal grandfather); Sophia "Yiayia Sophia" Mussolini (maternal grandmother); Norbert "Zack" Van Houten (paternal uncle); Bastardo Paulo (maternal uncle); Annika Van Houten (paternal cousin); Jillhouse Van Houten (paternal cousin); Eustace Van Houten (paternal great-great-grandfather); Milford Van Houten and Eliza Simpson (great-great-great-great-great-grandparents); Simpson family
- Origin: Italian-Greek-Dutch-Danish American

Milhouse Mussolini Van Houten is a fictional recurring character in the Fox animated television series The Simpsons voiced by Pamela Hayden until her retirement in 2025 and created by Matt Groening. Milhouse is Bart Simpson's childhood best friend in Mrs. Krabappel's fourth grade class at Springfield Elementary School. He is insecure, gullible, and is often led into trouble by Bart, who takes advantage of his friend's naivety. Milhouse is a regular target for school bully Nelson Muntz and his friends Jimbo Jones, Dolph Starbeam and Kearney Zzyzwicz. He has a crush on Bart's sister, Lisa, which is a common plot element.

Milhouse debuted in the 1988 commercial "The Butterfinger Group" while The Simpsons was still airing as a cartoon short series on the Fox variety show The Tracey Ullman Show. When The Simpsons was greenlit for a full series by Fox, Milhouse appeared in the first episode of the first season, "Simpsons Roasting on an Open Fire", becoming one of the series' most prominent recurring characters. Groening chose the name Milhouse (the middle name of President Richard Nixon was Milhous) because it was the most "unfortunate name [he] could think of for a kid". Milhouse's appearance is based on that of Rob Cohen. In the wake of Pamela Hayden's retirement in November 2024, it was confirmed that her characters, including Milhouse, would be recast in the future. Following Hayden's appearance in The Simpsons Disney+ special "O C'mon All Ye Faithful", Simpsons creator Matt Groening and writer Carolyn Omine revealed to Comic Book.com that Hayden would make a few more performances than initially announced. As of the end of season 36, Milhouse is now voiced by singer and actor Kelly Macleod.

== Profile ==
Milhouse is of Italian, Greek, Danish and Dutch descent, based on comments and characters introduced throughout the series. He shares the same physical features as both his parents, and his father's primary personality features (which include disappointment, insecurity, and generally depressed demeanor). Milhouse is constantly bullied by Nelson Muntz, Jimbo Jones, Dolph Starbeam, and Kearney Zzyzwicz, to the point that when Bart questions Milhouse by saying: "Milhouse! I thought you had a three o'clock wedgie with Nelson" in the episode "Little Orphan Millie"; Milhouse simply responds: "I had to reschedule". Lisa has also described Milhouse as "the class nerd'. The schoolyard bullies often victimize the socially and physically awkward Milhouse, who wears thick eyeglasses, without which he cannot see. Milhouse and family are among the few Springfield residents with visible eyebrows, which are rather thick.

Although not disliked and having a moderate number of friends among other kids from school aside from Bart himself, Milhouse has made a career of getting victimized, although his overall true antagonists are the schoolyard bullies of Springfield Elementary School (Nelson, Jimbo, Dolph, and Kearney). In "Sideshow Bob Roberts", Jimbo, Dolph, and Kearney wrapped Milhouse in bumper stickers and placed him in a shopping cart. After Jimbo claimed that "the mummy's ready for his mystical journey!", the bullies pushed the cart with Milhouse down a very steep hill. He is harmed frequently, and on some occasions is injured by dangerous hazards, e.g., being run over by a train, falling down a waterfall, receiving electrical shocks, having his head polished to bone, and having his teeth knocked out by a hockey puck. As a lead character he always survives and recovers, often with no further mention of any injuries. He frequently visited a female psychiatrist until even she could not deal with his constant calling and blocked his number.

On one occasion, Bart got Milhouse placed on the FBI's Most Wanted List even though they are friends, and tried to lure Milhouse into a cactus. Milhouse is not always subservient to Bart; in "Bart Sells His Soul", Milhouse toyed with Bart's anxiety after Bart sold his soul for $5, and Milhouse demanded $50 to return it. On another occasion, Bart introduced Milhouse to his girlfriend and had to explain why he and Milhouse are friends, but could not come up with a good answer and admitted it was due to geographical convenience. Bart did admit in "Little Orphan Millie" that he loves Milhouse.

Homer also sometimes makes fun of Milhouse (once referring to Milhouse in the boy's presence as "that little wiener"). In "Burns, Baby Burns", Larry, Mr. Burns' son, brings Homer to eat at his house. Mr. Burns was angry and he asks Homer if his son "brings home nitwits and make you talk to them", to which Homer answers "Oh, all the time! Have you ever heard of this kid Milhouse? He's a little wiener who...", before being interrupted by Burns. In an attempt to purposefully enrage his father, Bart once stated that he felt "a little attracted to Milhouse", sending Homer into a rage. Bart and Milhouse appear to be the same height, but in the episode "Radioactive Man", it is revealed that Milhouse is at least 1 in (25 mm) taller than Bart.

Milhouse is frequently the butt of a variety of jokes, such as being beaten up by Nelson for delivering a love note from Lisa (which Nelson thought was from Milhouse himself), having the door slammed in his face while playing pin the tail on the donkey, having his possible budding homosexuality given away by his school counselor to Homer and Marge by accidentally picking up the wrong folder while discussing Bart, making him a wanted fugitive (see above), and inadvertently inheriting Bart's dismal permanent record at school through a side deal arranged between Bart, Edna Krabappel and Principal Skinner, which will disqualify Milhouse from "all but the hottest and noisiest jobs".

He is fluent in Italian ("The Last of the Red Hat Mamas") due to visiting his maternal grandmother in Tuscany for two weeks every year. She hates the English language and would beat him whenever he spoke English, so he was forced to learn Italian. He began bed-wetting from this experience. He helps Lisa learn Italian, but there is no reference to his Italian background or language skills in any other episode. Milhouse's personality drastically changes when speaking Italian, becoming a suave, confident ladies' man popular with Springfield's Italian community in the episode. It is later revealed that both Milhouse's middle name and his maternal family name are "Mussolini".

The show's opening sequence, and various scenes of band practice suggests that Milhouse plays a brass or woodwind instrument, possibly clarinet or trumpet, but all the Springfield Elementary band members, besides Lisa, are very poor musicians.

Milhouse is allergic to honey, wheat, dairy, mistletoe, holly, the red parts of candy canes, and his own tears.

=== Romance ===
Milhouse harbors an occasionally reciprocated crush on Lisa, but their relationship is never shown as anything other than acquaintance or friendship. As shown in "Lisa's Date with Density", when she admits she liked Nelson – at the end of that episode, after she has stopped liking Nelson, Milhouse asks Lisa who will be her next crush; Lisa coyly answers that it could be anybody and Milhouse rejoices.

Lisa has always opposed the idea of going out with Milhouse (e.g. "Lisa's Date with Density" and "Future-Drama"); however, in the episode "The Last of the Red Hat Mamas", after Milhouse starts tutoring Lisa in Italian and takes her to Springfield's Little Italy, she begins to develop feelings for him, until she catches him with a girl named Angelica, and began cursing in Italian and chasing him with a branch just as his grandmother had done.

Milhouse's first real girlfriend was Samantha Stanky, a new student who had moved to Springfield from Phoenix, Arizona in the episode "Bart's Friend Falls in Love". After her father who responds to Bart's call caught her and Milhouse kissing, he shipped her off to a Catholic girls' school run by French-Canadian nuns. While Milhouse's official first kiss was with Samantha in the aforementioned episode, it was contradicted in the episode "The Way We Weren't", where Milhouse accidentally kisses Homer, during a game of spin the bottle that Homer interrupted. In the episode "Homer Scissorhands", Milhouse dated fifth grader Taffy. The relationship ended when Milhouse and Taffy caught Lisa spying on them in the bushes. Taffy told Lisa that Milhouse still loves her, and Lisa kisses Milhouse because "he looks cute in the moonlight". Lisa told Milhouse that he should not give up searching for other girls and that life has unexpected things to offer. In the episode "The Bart Wants What It Wants", Milhouse has a romantic relationship with Greta Wolfcastle, daughter of film star Rainier Wolfcastle.

Milhouse and Lisa's relationship has been used in episodes set in the show's future, outside of the show's canon. In the episode "Lisa's Wedding", set 15 years into the future, Milhouse is Homer's boss at the nuclear plant, and after learning of Lisa's impending marriage, Milhouse recalls an earlier date with Lisa in which she said she might never marry, then angrily prepares Homer's annual review. Later in the episode, Lisa wonders if it is acceptable to wear a white wedding dress, suggesting that she had already lost her virginity; Marge tells her, "Milhouse doesn't count". In the episode "Holidays of Future Passed" (2011), set 30 years into the future, Lisa and Milhouse are married and have a daughter, Zia.

== Creation ==
Milhouse was designed by Matt Groening for a planned series on NBC, which was abandoned. The design was then used for a Butterfinger commercial, and it was decided to use the character in the series. Milhouse was named after U.S. president Richard Milhous Nixon. The name was the most "unfortunate name Matt Groening could think of for a kid". Years earlier, in a 1986 Life in Hell comic entitled "What to Name the Baby", Groening listed Milhouse as a name "no longer recommended". Milhouse is a favorite among the staff as Al Jean noted "most of the writers are more like Milhouse than Bart". His last name was given to him by Howard Gewirtz, a freelance writer who wrote the episode "Homer Defined". Gewirtz got the name from one of his wife's friends. According to Arden Myrin and Dana Gould (former writer and co-executive producer of The Simpsons), Rob Cohen (Simpsons writer) inspired Milhouse's look.
