= Lazebnik =

Lazebnik, Lazebník, or LaZebnik is a surname, meaning "barber" in Czech. Notable people with this surname include:

- Betty Lazebnik, music composer, winner of two Genie Awards for Reno and the Doc
- Claire Scovell LaZebnik, American novelist and nonfiction author, married to Rob
- Elizabeth Lazebnik, Latvian Canadian filmmaker
- Ken LaZebnik (born 1954), American television writer, brother of Rob and Philip
- Leonid Lazebnik (born 1941), Russian physician
- Philip LaZebnik (born 1953), American screenwriter and producer, brother of Ken and Rob
- Rob LaZebnik (born 1962), American television writer, brother of Ken and Philip, married to Claire
- Svetlana Lazebnik (born 1979), Ukrainian-American computer vision researcher
- Teddy Lazebnik (born 1997), Israeli biomathematician and entrepreneur
- Faye Schulman (née Lazebnik, born 1919), photographer and survivor of the Lenin ghetto
