= Nell Scovell =

American screenwriter

- Born: Helen Vivian Scovell
- Education: Harvard University
- Occupations: Journalist, writer, producer
- Years active: 1986–present
- Spouses: Thomas Jonah Tisch (m. 1985; div. 1986) Colin Summers (m. 1993)
- Children: 2
- Relatives: Claire Scovell LaZebnik (sister)

Helen Vivian "Nell" Scovell is an American television and magazine writer, and producer. She is the creator of the television series Sabrina the Teenage Witch, which aired on ABC and The WB from 1996 until 2003 and co-author of the book Lean In.

== Early life and education ==
Nell Scovell, the middle of five children, grew up in a Jewish family outside of Newton, Massachusetts. Her father, Melvin E. Scovell, was chairman of the board of Scovell & Schwager, a health-care management company in Boston. In high school at Newton South High School, she was the manager of the boys' track team. Scovell attended Harvard University, where she spent her time reporting and editing sports stories for The Harvard Crimson. In her senior year at Harvard, she wrote for the sports desk of the Boston Globe. She graduated cum laude from Harvard University in 1982.

== Career ==
After graduation, she moved to New York and was the first staff writer hired by Spy magazine in 1986. Tina Brown recruited her to work at Vanity Fair, where she contributed quirky visual features about money and culture. Scovell later ran into an old Spy editor, who recommended she write for television.

Scovell wrote a spec script for It's Garry Shandling's Show, which was bought. After serving as story editor for the final season of Newhart, she worked on Late Night with David Letterman.

As a television writer, Scovell wrote the season two episode of The Simpsons, "One Fish, Two Fish, Blowfish, Blue Fish"; she also wrote the season 32 episode "Sorry Not Sorry". She was one of the first women to write an episode of The Simpsons. Other TV writing credits include The Wilton North Report, Coach, Monk, Murphy Brown, Charmed, Newhart, The Critic, NCIS, and many others. She also wrote the season two episode of Space Ghost Coast to Coast, "Urges".

Scovell has directed two television films: Hayley Wagner, Star for Showtime, and It Was One of Us for Lifetime.

Outside of television, Scovell is a former contributing editor at Vanity Fair, and has written for Vogue, Rolling Stone, Self, Tatler, and The New York Times Magazine. She currently blogs for Vanity Fair's web site.

In 2019, Scovell joined other Writers Guild of America (WGA) members in firing their agents as part of the WGAs' stand against the Association of Talent Agents (ATA) and the practice of movie packaging.

== Letterman and late-night comedy controversy ==
In 2009, after Letterman admitted to having sexual relationships with his female staffers, she published an essay in Vanity Fair calling his show a "hostile work environment" for women. She noted that Letterman's shows had hired only seven female writers in 27 years. Male writers had spent a combined total of 378 years on staff, and women had spent 17. Scovell alleged that late-night TV executives excused gender disparities in their writers rooms by claiming that women don't apply for writing jobs. Women did apply in lower numbers than men, she acknowledged, but, in her view, that was because "the shows often rely on current (white male) writers to recommend their funny (white male) friends to be future (white male) writers." She recommended targeted outreach to women bloggers, improv performers, and stand-ups.

Spinning off her piece, the New York Times reported that three of the top late-night television shows—The Jay Leno Show, Late Show with David Letterman and The Tonight Show with Conan O'Brien—had no female writers. The Times interviewed comedy writer Merrill Markoe, who mentioned an "odd shift toward more boys' humor in the '90s" that in her view might have kept women from landing late-night jobs. Scovell encouraged women to apply for jobs and matched them with executives and head writers. When Jimmy Kimmel began his show on ABC, she wrote a letter to ABC Television Group president Anne Sweeney about having more women in late night. She was contacted by Molly McNearney, the head writer for the show, and passed along the names of two writers—Bess Kalb and Joelle Boucai—who were hired.

In 2019, Scovell wrote a followup article for Vanity Fair about how she had met with Letterman to discuss the original piece, which he admitted he had not read but that Scovell "assigned" to him for the later meeting "as homework". Scovell alleges Letterman was contrite, quoting him as saying "I'm sorry I was that way and I was happy to have read the piece because it wasn't angering. I felt horrible because who wants to be the guy that makes people unhappy to work where they're working?" She also wrote that since 2009 "the number of female writers and writers of color in late night has improved, in part because you can't go lower than zero," citing Full Frontal with Samantha Bee as the only late night show that had "gender parity" in the writers' room. She wrote about her discussion with Letterman, "We need more dialogue so men can understand the difference between criticism and condemnation. And we need more dialogue so women can voice discomfort without fear of retaliation."

== Books ==
Scovell co-wrote Sheryl Sandberg's 2013 book Lean In.

In 2018, Scovell's book Just the Funny Parts: ... And a Few Hard Truths About Sneaking into the Hollywood Boys' Club was published with a foreword by Sheryl Sandberg.

== Personal life ==
Briefly married to Tom Tisch, Scovell then married Colin Summers, an architect. They have two sons. Her sister is Claire Scovell LaZebnik, who is married to Rob LaZebnik, whose brothers Philip LaZebnik and Ken LaZebnik are both screenwriters.

Comedian/magician Penn Jillette called her "one of the funniest people alive" in an interview with The A.V. Club.
