= City Clinical Hospital No. 50 (Moscow) =

Spasokukotsky City Clinical Hospital No. 50
- Department of Healthcare of the Government of Moscow
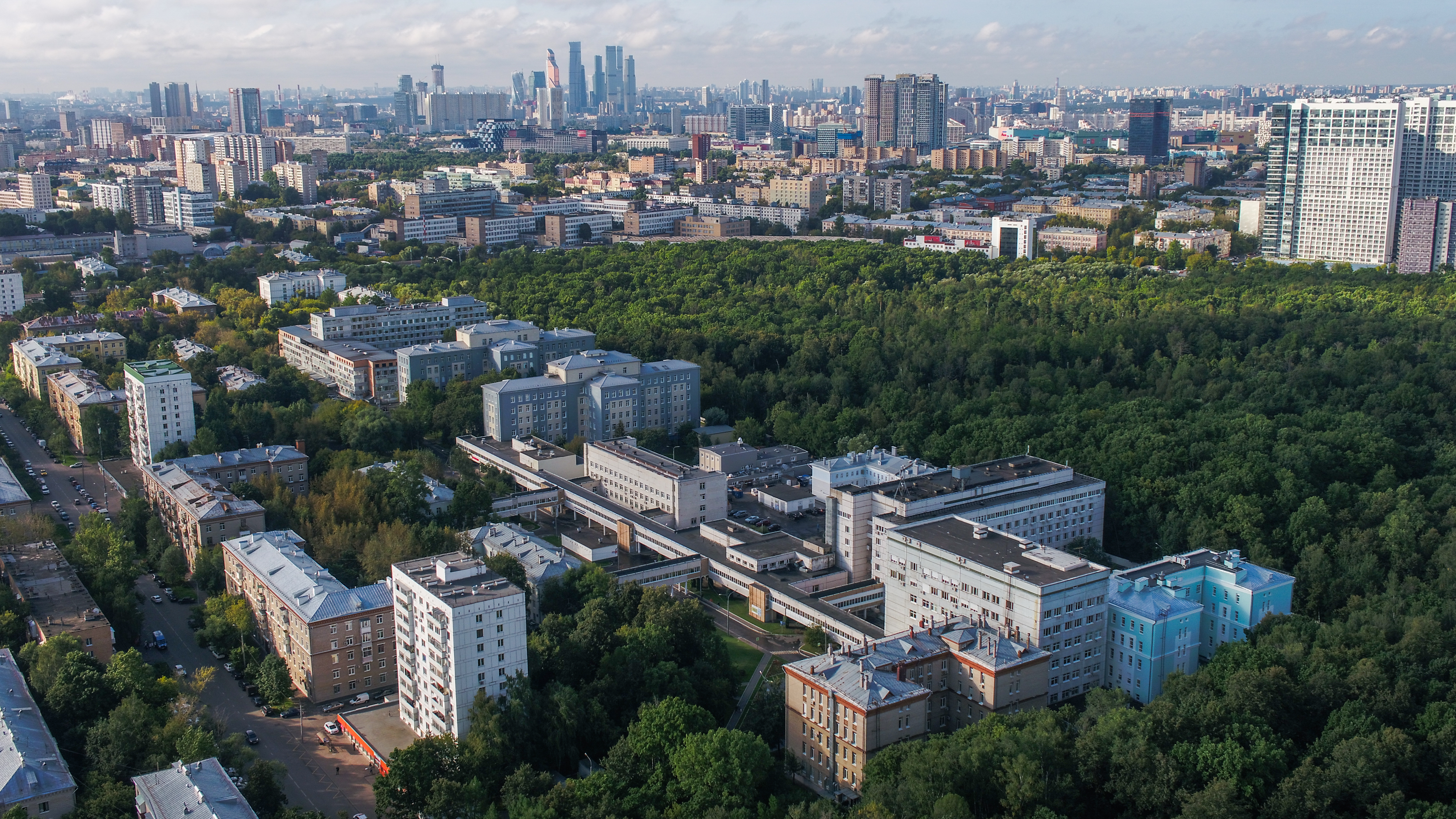
- Aerial view of the hospital complex

Geography
- Location: 21 Vuchetina str., Moscow, Russia

Organisation
- Type: District

Helipads
- Helipad: Yes

History
- Founded: 1955

Links
- Website: www.50gkb.ru
- Lists: Hospitals in Russia

Spasokukotsky City Clinical Hospital No. 50 (Russian: Городская клиническая больница № 50 имени С. И. Спасокукоцкого) is a multidisciplinary medical institution subordinate to the Department of Health of the Government of Moscow. The hospital is located in the Timiryazevsky District of the Northern Administrative Okrug. Every year, more than 50 thousand patients from all over Russia are treated at the hospital.

== History ==
The official opening date of Hospital No. 50 is August 25, 1955, when in the 2nd building of the hospital, doctor Manevich admitted the first patient to the surgical department. The hospital was headed by Nina Petrovna Brusova

Since 1965, the hospital has become the clinical base of the Semashko Moscow Medical Institute. By order of the Soviet Minister of Health No. 962 issued on 23 December 1965, the hospital was given the name City Clinical Hospital No. 50.

In 1968, in the premises of the former gynecological department, an ophthalmology department was opened under the leadership of the future professor, head of the department of eye diseases of the Moscow Medical Institute named after. N. A. Semashko Svyatoslav Nikolaevich Fedorov.

On its 60th anniversary, in September 2015, City Clinical Hospital No. 50 was named after the outstanding scientist and surgeon Sergey Spasokukotsky (1870–1943), who created the Soviet clinical school in the field of gastrointestinal and pulmonary surgery.

In May 2014, the Center for Robot-Assisted Operative and Reconstructive Urology was opened on the basis of City Clinical Hospital No. 50. It is headed by Academician of the Russian Academy of Sciences, Dmitry Pushkar.
