= Ship of Fools (website) =

Christian satirical website

- Website type: Christian online magazine
- Available in: English
- Creators: Simon Jenkins; Stephen Goddard
- Website: www.shipoffools.com
- Registration: Registration required only to use internet forums or interactive church
- Launched: 1 April 1998; 28 years ago
- Current status: Active

Ship of Fools is a UK-based Christian satirical website.

== Origins ==
Ship of Fools was first launched as a magazine in 1977. The magazine folded in 1983 and was resurrected as an internet magazine website and bulletin board system community forum in 1998. Subtitled "the magazine of Christian unrest", Ship of Fools pokes fun and asks critical questions about the Christian faith. The site is part magazine and part web community.

== Leadership ==
Ship of Fools was founded and is edited by Simon Jenkins (editor) and Stephen Goddard (co-editor). Jenkins is an author, designer and cartoonist from London (not to be confused with Sir Simon Jenkins, former Editor of The Times and author of England's Thousand Best Churches). Goddard is a journalist and public relations consultant; both have formal theological education. They also perform a show, Ship of Fools Live, in churches, universities and elsewhere, with excerpts from the site's magazine content. The show toured in the United States in February 2004.

== Website ==
The website presents itself as ecumenical/pan-Christian, although the prevailing ethos is English-speaking Trinitarian Christianity. The diversity of the users range from complete atheists to evangelical and liberal Christians.

Notable features of Ship of Fools website are:

- "The Mystery Worshipper" – reports on church services made by anonymous worshippers. The intention is to give feedback on how they appear to outsiders and first-time visitors.
- "Gadgets for God" – kitsch Christian-based products on the internet.
- "Features & Projects" – irregular columns and a range of projects including "R Father" (2001 competition for rewriting the Lord's prayer as a text message) and "Church of Fools" (see below).
- Discussion boards – debate and discussion amongst registered members, who are known as ("shipmates").

"Church of Fools", an online 3D interactive church, originally ran as a multi-user environment from May to September 2004, before moving to its own website and eventually becoming St Pixels (whose last service was on Facebook in 2015). In April 2020, "Church of Fools" returned to the Ship of Fools website in response to the COVID-19 crisis.

== Other Activities ==
Ship of Fools sometimes leaves the internet for the real world. There are frequent "Shipmeets" where shipmates get together at different locations around the world. Ship of Fools also ran a Ned Flanders Night at the Christian festival Greenbelt.

== See also ==
- Lark News
- The Wittenburg Door
- The Babylon Bee
