= Yelena Malysheva =

Russian physician and TV presenter

- Елена Малышева (Russian)
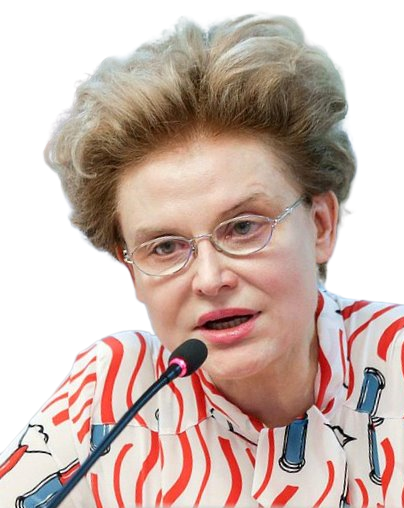
- Yelena Malysheva in State Duma, 2019
- Born: Yelena Vasilyevna Shabunina; 13 March 1961 (age 65); Kemerovo, RSFSR, USSR
- Education: Kemerovo State Medical University
- Awards: Order of Friendship; Medal "For Merit in National Health Care"; Badge "For Excellence in Healthcare"
- Scientific career
- Workplaces: Moscow State University of Medicine and Dentistry; Russian National Research Medical University
- Website: elena-malysheva.com

Voice recording of E. V. Malysheva
From an interview to "Echo of Moscow",
August 18, 2009

Yelena Vasilyevna Malysheva (Russian: Елена Васильевна Малышева, born 13 March 1961, Kemerovo, USSR) is a Russian physician, internist, cardiologist, teacher, and television host. She has been educating Russians on healthy lifestyles for two decades.

She hosts the TV programs Zdorovye (since 3 October 1997) and Zhit zdorovo! (since 16 August 2010), which air on Channel One. She is currently a professor at the Moscow State University of Medicine and Dentistry.

== Early life and education ==
Yelena Malysheva was born on 13 March 1961 in Kemerovo to a family of doctors. She graduated from high school No. 19 in Kemerovo with a gold medal and was accepted to the Kemerovo Medical Institute, earning a red diploma in 1983. The following year she started a postgraduate course at the Academy of Medical Sciences in Moscow.

== Career ==
In 1987 she defended her dissertation on Prevention and elimination of heart rhythm disorders by adapting to stress and activating gamma-aminobutyric acid. After working as a general practitioner for some time, she became an assistant in the Department of Internal Diseases of the Second Medical Institute.

In 1992 she began producing the program Recipe on the Kuzbass Channel (Kemerovo). A year later she became writer and host of the program Lazaret, going on in 1994 to fill the same positions for the daily program Doktora vyzyvali?. In the same year she completed a training course at the European Center for Health and the Environment in the United States, to which the most prominent health-related journalists in Europe were invited. She also oversaw the program Dear Editorial Board for daytime TV channel Delovaya Rossiya until 1997. After the revival of the Zdorovye program on Channel One in 1997, Malysheva became its host, director and writer. The first episode aired on 3 October 1997. Until 2014 the program was also broadcast on Radio Rossii.

In December 2000 she was one of the three co-founders of the annual national medical award "Prizvaniye", which she helps oversee to this day along with Alexander Rosenbaum. She holds the position of president in the award foundation. In 2003 she briefly hosted the daytime talk show Gorod zhenshchin on Channel One with Dana Borisova and Larisa Krivtsova.

In 2007 she defended her dissertation for the degree of Doctor of Medical Sciences; it was on the topic "Reprogramming of macrophage cellular responses: a new strategy for managing the inflammatory process" (scientific consultant: A. G. Rumyantsev) at First Moscow State Medical University. Since that year she has been a member of the Academy of Russian television. On 16 August 2010, she began hosting the program Zhit zdorovo! on Channel One, which is released on weekday mornings. The show broadcasts on state television have been at the center of multiple mind-blowing scandals over the years.

She is the author of more than 50 scientific publications in the field of medicine. Currently she is a professor at the Moscow State University of Medicine and Dentistry.
