= The Simpsons and Portland, Oregon =

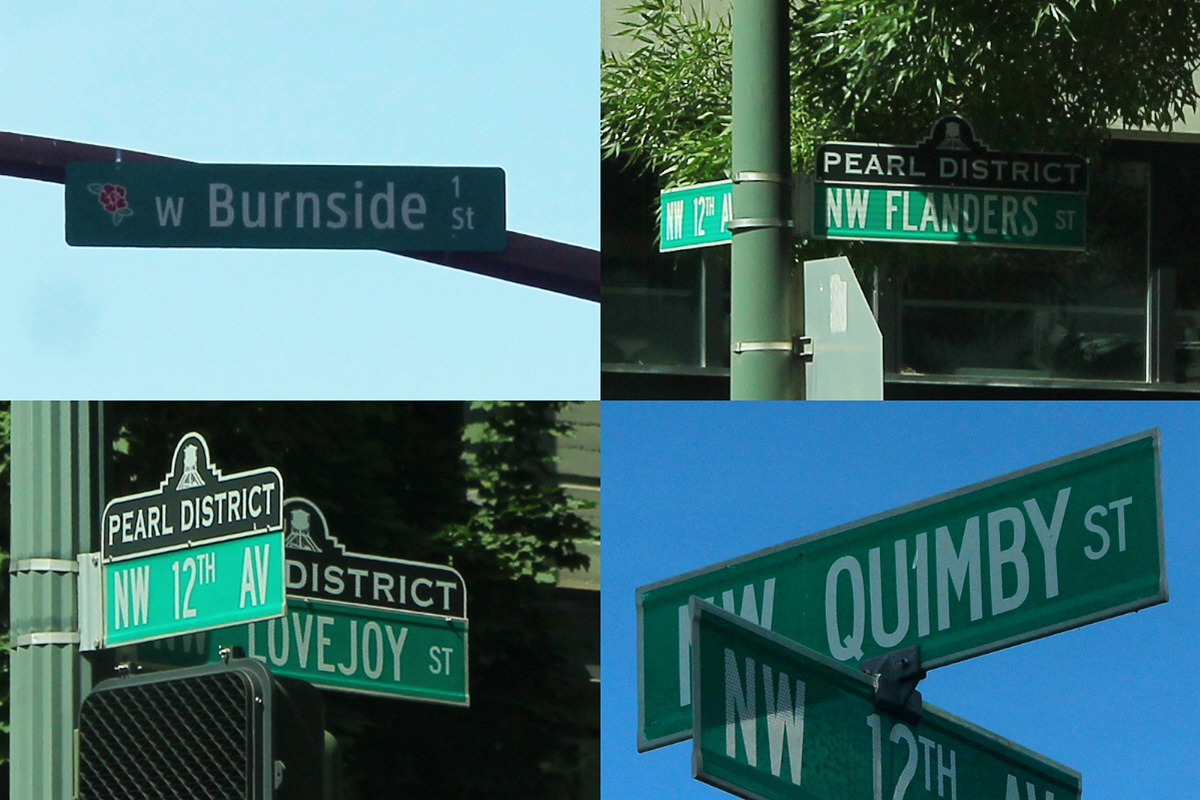
Signs for streets in Portland, Oregon which inspired select characters on The Simpsons

There are many connections between the American animated sitcom The Simpsons and the city of Portland, Oregon, the hometown of series creator Matt Groening.

Many characters on the show have names similar to streets in Portland; Burnside, Flanders, Kearney, Lovejoy, Quimby, and Terwilliger inspired Mr. Burns, Ned Flanders, Kearney Zzyzwicz, Reverend Lovejoy, Mayor Quimby, and Robert Onderdonk Terwilliger Jr. (better known as Sideshow Bob), respectively.

The 2019 episode "Marge the Lumberjill" is set in Portland and includes street signs with the names that inspired the character names.

In early 2021, Groening signed a portrait of Homer Simpson for a fundraising auction for Lincoln High School, his alma mater.

Ned Flanders Crossing (2021), a footbridge spanning Interstate 405 to connect the Northwest District and Pearl District, is named after Ned Flanders.

In 2021, an anonymous artist installed a "Merge Simpson" depicting Marge Simpson near an on-ramp to Interstate 405 in northwest Portland. The sign was displayed below a column of shrubbery resembling Simpson's beehive. City officials removed the sign because of driving safety concerns.

== See also ==
- "The Day the Earth Stood Cool" (December 9, 2012)
