= Flanders' Ladder =

- The Simpsons episode
- Episode no.: Season 29; Episode 21
- Directed by: Matthew Nastuk
- Written by: J. Stewart Burns
- Production code: XABF14
- Original air date: May 20, 2018

Guest appearance
- Jackie Mason as Rabbi Hyman Krustofsky

Episode features
- Couch gag: The Simpsons rush in only to find the couch missing. Marge rings a bell and calls in woodworkers who build a couch out of wood. The family sit on the couch and Homer tries to turn on the TV, but the remote doesn't work. A woodworker tells him "no electricity" and Homer says "D'oh!". The opening credits are shown on wood as the TV has no power.

Episode chronology
← Previous "Throw Grampa from the Dane"	Next → "Bart's Not Dead"
- The Simpsons season 29

"Flanders' Ladder" is the twenty-first and final episode of the twenty-ninth season of the American animated television series The Simpsons, and the 639th episode of the series overall. The episode was directed by Matthew Nastuk and written by J. Stewart Burns. It aired in the United States on Fox on May 20, 2018.

In this episode, Lisa gives Bart nightmares while he is in a coma after he is struck by lightning. Jackie Mason guest starred as Rabbi Hyman Krustofsky. The episode received mixed reviews.

The episode was dedicated in memory of author Tom Wolfe who had guest starred on the show in the episode "Moe'N'a Lisa". He died from an infection on May 14, 2018.

== Plot ==
On a stormy night, Bart tricks Lisa into playing The Scary Maze Game and posts photos of her being scared. Later, lightning hits the power line, cutting the family off from the Internet. To pass the time, the family watches VHS tapes on their VCR, but when it breaks, Bart and Homer try to steal Flanders' router. Bart climbs a ladder to his attic, but as Homer is distracted, Bart gets hit by lightning and falls into a coma. Dr. Hibbert tells the family to talk to him until he recovers. Lisa is left alone with Bart and gets revenge on him by giving him nightmares. Bart wakes up in his bed and sees the ghost of Maude.

In his nightmare, Milhouse visits as Bart decorates his treehouse with crosses to keep ghosts out. Maude returns, but Bart scares her away. Milhouse suggests Bart talk to his psychiatrist, but he is a ghost too. He says Bart can communicate with the dead and requests his help with revenge against a rival doctor. Bart tricks the rival into playing The Scary Maze Game, allowing him to go to the afterlife. More ghosts ask Bart for help, and he complies. Lisa gives Bart nightmares until Hibbert says this could give him permanent brain damage. As Lisa apologizes, Homer exhaustedly enters the room and says he is dead, which digs Bart deeper into his nightmare. Bart agrees to help Maude, who wants revenge on Homer for causing her death. (Note: As depicted in the eleventh season episode "Alone Again, Natura-Diddily") Bart arranges for Jimbo, Dolph, and Kearney to fire T-shirts at him. While Maude moves on, Homer's spirit rises from his body.

Homer begins to ascend into Heaven while Lisa pleads for Bart to stay with her as he begins to flatline. Bart, wanting his father to stay, shoots a T-shirt to the light of Heaven. This causes Homer's spirit to fall back in his body and restores him to life. Homer strangles Bart for ruining his opportunity. Lisa continues to apologize to Bart, admitting that she loves him and wants him back. Bart wakes up, to Lisa's relief. When asked, Lisa admits to giving him nightmares, and he asks her to teach him how to do that to other people.

Later, while the family celebrates Bart coming out of his coma, Bart tells Lisa he has discovered how everyone will die. Lisa does not want to hear it, but he tells her anyway.

== Production ==
The episode was dedicated in memory of author Tom Wolfe who guest starred on the show in the eighteenth season episode "Moe'N'a Lisa".

== Cultural references ==
The montage of Simpsons characters dying at the end of the episode is a parody of a similar montage at the end of the television series Six Feet Under, including the song "Breathe Me" by Sia playing in the background.

== Reception ==
"Flanders' Ladder" scored a 0.8 rating with a 3 share and was watched by 2.10 million people, making it Fox's highest rated show of the night.

Dennis Perkins of The A.V. Club gave this episode a C−, stating, "’Flanders’ Ladder’ is a piddling mess of an episode, peppered with a laugh or two, that never commits either to going for real emotional resonance, or comically undercutting it. So it just bobs along, occasionally landing on a funny idea but built on a disastrous foundation of mischaracterization and glibness. So when the ending comes, only the least discriminating would feel its montage of character deaths as anything but a cheap gambit to close out a truly disappointing episode (and season) with unmerited weight."

Tony Sokol of Den of Geek gave the episode 4 out of 5 stars. He called it a happy rebirthing and praised the jokes and sight gags. He highlighted Bart's interaction with the ghosts and Lisa's manipulations. In 2023, Sokol named this episode the ninth-best episode of The Simpsons from the 2010s.

Jesse Schedeen of IGN gave the episode an 8 out of 10. He called the episode impressive where it used call backs from classic moments without making the story redundant.

Screen Rant called it the best episode of the 29th season.
