= Dmitry Pushkar =

Russian urologist

- Дмитрий Пушкарь
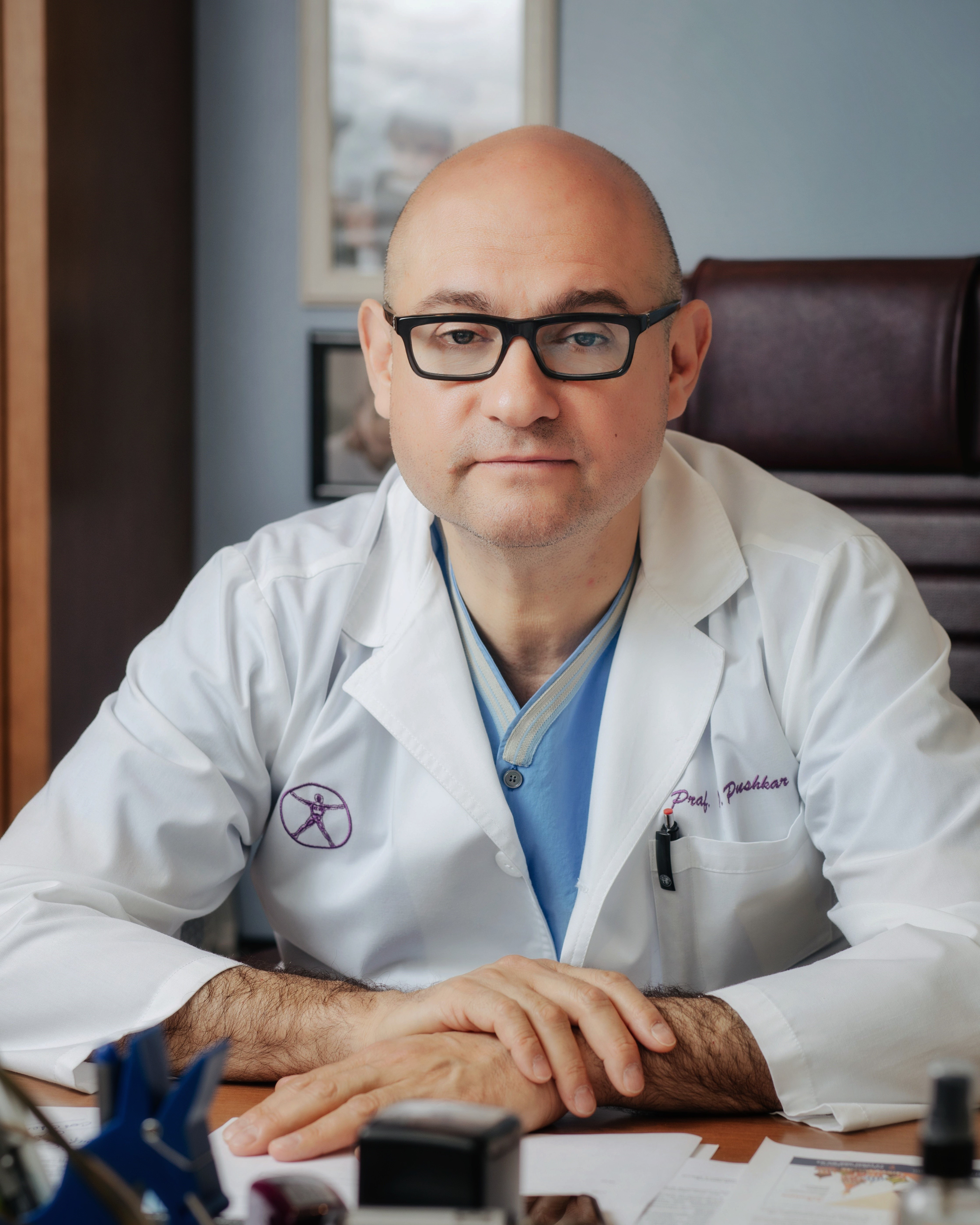
- Born: 19 July 1963; Moscow, RSFSR, USSR
- Citizenship: Russia
- Education: State University of Medicine and Dentistry
- Known for: Chief urolog of the Russian Ministry of Health
- Awards: Order of Pirogov; State Prize of the Russian Federation; Russian Federation Presidential Certificate of Honour; Decoration "For Services to Moscow"
- Medical career
- Profession: Specialist, surgeon
- Institutions: Moscow State University of Medicine and Dentistry; City Clinical Hospital No. 50
- Sub-specialties: Urology; Chirurgy

Dmitry Yurievich Pushkar (Russian: Дмитрий Юрьевич Пушкарь) (born 19 July 1963 in Moscow) is a Russian urologist, scientist, practicing surgeon, Doctor of Medical Sciences, professor and academician of the Russian Academy of Sciences (2019). Head of the Department of Urology, Russian University of Medicine, Ministry of Health of Russia. Head of the Moscow Urological Center based at the Botkin Hospital. Laureate of the State Prize of the Russian Federation in the field of science and technology (2022).

== Biography ==
In 1980, after graduating from secondary school No. 480, he entered the Moscow Medical Dental Institute. In 1986 he graduated from that institute with honors. He continued his studies in 1986–1987. He was a resident of the surgical department and worked at the Department of Urology from 1987 to 1996 as a senior laboratory assistant and assistant professor.

In 1990, he successfully defended his thesis on the topic “Functional state of the lower urinary tract after radical operations on the uterus”, and in 1996 he defended his dissertation for the degree of Doctor of Medical Sciences on the topic “Diagnostics and treatment of complex and combined forms of urinary incontinence”.

In 1993–1998, he completed an internship and worked as a consultant physician at the Urology Clinic of the Pasteur Institute in Nice, France. From 1996 to 2001 he was a professor of the Department of Urology at Moscow State University of Medicine and Dentistry and from 2001 to the present as Head of the Department of Urology at the same university. He currently heads the Urology Clinic of the City Clinical Hospital No. 50 in Moscow.

On October 28, 2016, Dmitry Yuryevich was elected a corresponding member of the Russian Academy of Sciences in the Department of Medical Sciences, and since November 15, 2019 he has been an Academician of the Russian Academy of Sciences.

He is one of the first to introduce Da Vinci robotic systems into the Russian healthcare system. In 2008, he performed the first robot-assisted operation in Moscow to remove a prostate gland affected by cancer using Da Vinci (robot surgeon). In 2020, during the COVID-19 pandemic in Russia, he became the chief clinical researcher for the medical company Areplivir. With his help, the City Clinical Hospital No. 50 was completely repurposed for the hospitalization of patients with coronavirus infection.
