= The Last Man Expanding =

- The Simpsons episode
- Episode no.: Season 36; Episode 13
- Directed by: Timothy Bailey
- Written by: J. Stewart Burns
- Production code: 36ABF06
- Original air date: April 6, 2025

Guest appearances
- Sidse Babett Knudsen as Othinquic pen; Joe Mantegna as Fat Tony

Episode features
- Couch gag: The Simpsons are launched in a pinball machine with Homer landing in his work station hole and the rest of the family landing in the couch holes.

Episode chronology
← Previous "The Flandshees of Innersimpson"	Next → "P.S. I Hate You"
- The Simpsons season 36

"The Last Man Expanding" is the thirteenth episode of the thirty-sixth season of the American animated television series The Simpsons, and the 784th episode overall. It aired in the United States on Fox on April 6, 2025. The episode was written by J. Stewart Burns and directed by Timothy Bailey.

In this episode, the overweight townsfolk begin taking a weight-loss drug, but Homer is not interested until Marge asks him to take it. Sidse Babett Knudsen guest starred. The episode received mixed reviews.

== Plot ==
At Moe's, Homer, Lenny, Carl, and Moe discover Barney has been missing for a week. A slim Barney arrives and says he is taking the prescription drug Othinquic for hyperglycemia where weight loss is a side effect. News of the drug spreads around town, and the restauranteurs lose business. All the overweight citizens start taking the drug except Homer, who is not interested. However, Marge is worried about Homer's health, so she asks Homer to take the drug, and he agrees to it.

Marge discovers that Patty and Selma are engaged to be married after they and their fiancés lost weight. She wonders why they are lying about losing weight through diet and exercise instead of admitting they are taking the drug. Homer learns the drug is expensive and not covered by insurance, so he cannot afford it. He obtains a stolen dose from Fat Tony. Walking around town, Marge finds the drug users looking sad and learns that a side effect of the drug is face sagging, which can be fixed with injections of body fat. Worried about his safety, she stops Homer from taking the drug and throws it in the trash. Suddenly, Fat Tony arrives and kidnaps Homer.

Fat Tony tries to force-feed Homer so that he can harvest his fat to fix the faces of the people who take the drug. Marge arrives with the restauranteurs to demand Homer be released. After freeing Homer, Marge asks them to stop taking the drug because to what is happening with their faces. Homer tells them that they are unhappy and should love who they are on the inside. At home, Marge says Patty and Selma lost their fiances and are holding a ceremony where they marry themselves. Marge decides to use the Othinquic she threw away earlier so she can fit into her black dress and wear it to the ceremony.

== Production ==
Sidse Babett Knudsen guest starred as the Othinquic pen. Knudsen previously guest starred in the twenty-ninth season episode "Throw Grampa from the Dane" as a different character.

== Cultural references ==
The weight loss drug Othinquic is a parody of the prescription drug Ozempic.

"Weight-Loss Drug" song is a parody of The Velvet Underground's Heroin.

== Reception ==
=== Viewing figures ===
The episode earned a 0.16 rating and was watched by 0.69 million viewers, which was the second-most watched show on Fox that night.

=== Critical response ===
John Schwarz of Bubbleblabber gave the episode a 10 out of 10. He thought it was the best episode of the season to date and found the subject matter to be funny given that the series is produced in a region where people preach body positivity while they also alter themselves through plastic surgery. Mike Celestino of Laughing Place thought the episode was funny at the beginning but became progressively worse. He also thought the subject matter was not topical. Marisa Roffman of Give Me My Remote liked the music of the Othinquic commercial parodying the Ozempic commercial but questioned if the episode would relevant in the future.

Brandon Zachary of Screen Rant stated that the episode was a satire of the pharmaceutical industry, comparing it to the sixteenth-season episode "Midnight Rx". He concluded, "Othinquic's story highlights how The Simpsons can approach persistent social problems from different perspectives." In another article on the same site, Brandon Zachary commented that the thin residents of Springfield frightened him because "the physical and mental transformations of the rest of the cast are disturbing, with their usual features erased and replaced by a merciless need for more drugs." He concluded, "By highlighting the changes in traditional characters caused by the unhealthy use of weight-loss drugs, The Simpsons makes the episode's theme especially clear."

JM McNab of Cracked.com stated that the premise had already been addressed in the animated series South Park episode "South Park: The End of Obesity." He added that this is the first time the show has surpassed The Simpsons in anything, given that it has already done everything. This is something the creators of South Park satirized in the sixth season episode "Simpsons Already Did It." Nick Valdez of Comicbook.com ranked the episode number 16 on his list of all episodes of the season. He commented, "It's a fun Springfield episode, as the town is great when it gets crazy in situations like this, but it reaches its limit pretty quickly."
