= Left Behind (The Simpsons) =

- The Simpsons episode
- Episode no.: Season 29; Episode 19
- Directed by: Lance Kramer
- Story by: Al Jean
- Teleplay by: Joel H. Cohen; John Frink
- Production code: XABF12
- Original air date: May 6, 2018

Guest appearances
- Michael Dees sings "My Funny Valentine"; Marcia Wallace as Edna Krabappel (archive recording)

Episode features
- Couch gag: The Simpsons turn the home into a Ferris wheel.

Episode chronology
← Previous "Forgive and Regret"	Next → "Throw Grampa from the Dane"
- The Simpsons season 29

"Left Behind" is the nineteenth episode of the twenty-ninth season of the American animated television series The Simpsons, and the 637th episode of the series overall. The episode was directed by Lance Kramer with a story by Al Jean and teleplay by Joel H. Cohen and John Frink. It aired in the United States on Fox on May 6, 2018.

In the episode, Ned Flanders loses his job and struggles to find a new one, turning to the Simpson family for assistance. The episode received mixed reviews.

The episode features the late Marcia Wallace, who died on October 25, 2013, appearing as Edna Krabappel via the use of archive audio recordings.

== Plot ==
During dinner, a solar eclipse occurs. Marge, Lisa, Bart, Maggie and Grampa go outside to watch the solar eclipse, but Homer stays inside and continues to eat because it is "pork chop night". Marge is irritated by Homer's apathy, so he takes her out for a romantic date night the next day. As Homer and Marge return from their date, Ned Flanders comes to them looking for advice, now unemployed after being forced to close his store the Leftorium. Homer helps Ned get a human resources job at the power plant, while Rod and Todd stay with the Simpsons, with Todd getting on Lisa's nerves.

At the plant, Ned's heavy-handed methods irritate the other employees, especially Homer. That night, Homer prays for Ned to be fired, which occurs the next day after he suggests Mr. Burns give money to charity. Ned takes on several more jobs, including a harbor cruise dance instructor, a photographer for Rolling Stone Magazine, and a roadside bible salesman, but fails each time and becomes depressed. Marge suggests Ned follow Jesus's example and become a teacher, leading him to become a substitute teacher at Springfield Elementary. He is quickly overwhelmed by all of the unruly students in Bart's class, and resigns after Bart is peer-pressured by Nelson into spitballing his mustache.

Feeling bad about ruining Ned's life, Bart and Homer go to his house to apologize and convince him to return to teaching. Ned is hesitant, but Bart convinces him by reminding him of Bart's former teacher, Ned's deceased wife Edna Krabappel. Ned and Bart organize a plan to get the students to be obedient. Using a series of tricks by Bart, he and Ned are able to pacify the students by creating supposed acts of God that frighten them. Ned is instilled with a newfound confidence, and thanks Bart for his help.

== Reception ==
Dennis Perkins of The A.V. Club gave this episode a D+, stating, "’Left Behind’ is about everything and nothing. To be more accurate, this record-setting episode begins being about more than a half-dozen things, and then never pays off a single one. An oil-in-water quality suffuses episodes like this, the half- (at best) realized plot lines too insubstantial to register for moments past their half-assed completion."

Tony Sokol of Den of Geek gave the episode 4.5 stars out of 5, calling it a "righteous episode."

"Left Behind" scored a 4 share and was watched by 2.15 million people, making it Fox's highest rated show of the night.
