= Dead Putting Society =

- The Simpsons episode
- Episode no.: Season 2 Episode 6
- Directed by: Rich Moore
- Written by: Jeff Martin
- Production code: 7F08
- Original air date: November 15, 1990

Episode features
- Chalkboard gag: "I am not a 32 year old woman"
- Couch gag: Santa's Little Helper and Snowball II jump on the couch.
- Commentary: Matt Groening; Jeff Martin; Al Jean; Mike Reiss; Rich Moore

Episode chronology
← Previous "Dancin' Homer"	Next → "Bart vs. Thanksgiving"
- The Simpsons season 2

"Dead Putting Society" is the sixth episode of the second season of the American animated television series The Simpsons. It originally aired on Fox in the United States on November 15, 1990. In the episode, Homer and Ned quarrel and bet which of their sons, Bart or Todd, will win a miniature golf tournament. Homer is confident Bart will win and bets that the father of the boy who does not win must mow the other's lawn in his wife's Sunday dress.

The episode, which was the first to prominently feature Ned and the rest of his family, was written by Jeff Martin and directed by Rich Moore. Its title references the 1989 coming-of-age drama film Dead Poets Society. While animating "Dead Putting Society", the animators went on a field trip to a local miniature golf course to study the mechanics of a golf club swing. Since airing, the episode has received positive reviews from critics. It acquired a Nielsen rating of 14.3, and was the highest-rated show on the Fox network the week it aired.

== Plot ==
Watching Homer mow his lawn with frustration, Ned invites him to his basement rec room for a beer. When Homer sees Ned's well-furnished house and his perfect relationship with his family, he angrily accuses Ned of showing off and is asked to leave. Later Ned feels guilty about his outburst and writes a letter of apology to Homer. Homer reads the letter aloud at the breakfast table, where the Simpson family ridicule at Ned's sentimentality, as well as his use of the word "bosom".

Homer takes Bart and Maggie to Sir Putt-A-Lot's Merrie Olde Fun Centre for a round of miniature golf. They encounter Ned and his son Todd there and play golf together. Bart and Todd learn of an upcoming children's miniature golf tournament and enter it. Although Todd is skilled at playing, Homer is confident Bart will win. He tells Bart that it is not acceptable to lose and forces him to angrily stare at a picture of Todd for fifteen minutes every day for motivation.

Doubting his golfing skills after seeing his meager collection of sports trophies, Bart accepts Lisa's offer to help him practice. Lisa approaches the task as a zen master, teaching Bart to meditate. She finds the golf course is based on simple geometry and teaches Bart how to achieve a low par. Homer makes a bet with Ned about whose son is a better golfer: the father of the boy who does not win the tournament will mow the other father's lawn in his wife's Sunday dress.

On the day of the tournament, Homer encourages Bart to win at all costs. Bart and Todd play well and are tied when they reach the eighteenth hole. Realizing that they are equally skilled at golf, they call it a draw and split the $50 prize. Ned suggests that means their bet is off, but Homer insists that they both must mow each other's lawn in their wife's Sunday dress because of the way their bet is worded. To Homer's dismay, Ned is not humiliated but actually enjoys mowing Homer's lawn in his wife's dress because it reminds him of his college fraternity days.

== Production ==
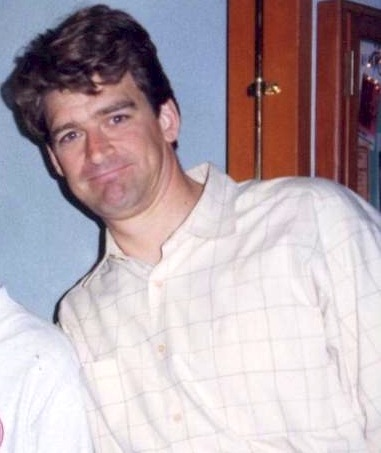
Jeff Martin, writer of "Dead Putting Society", was an experienced miniature golfer.

"Dead Putting Society" was written by Jeff Martin and directed by Rich Moore. Martin was an experienced miniature golfer and based much of the golf-related scenes in the script on his own experiences. Parts of this episode are also based on the film The Karate Kid (1984), including the way Bart practices for the miniature golf tournament by balancing on a trash can in a "crane position". For "Dead Putting Society", the animators went on a field trip to a local miniature golf course to study the mechanics of a golf club swing. Moore commented that the reason for this was that much of the humor on The Simpsons comes from making the scenery look lifelike; "The realism of the background serves as the straight man for the absurd situations."

This episode was the first to prominently feature Ned Flanders and the rest of his family, and contained the first major appearance of Rod Flanders, as well as the debut of Maude Flanders. Maggie Roswell was given the role of Maude, Ned's loving wife, and became a regular cast member with this episode until 1999 after a pay dispute, eventually resulting in the character being killed off in the Season 11 episode "Alone Again, Natura-Diddly", which aired the following year. She had previously played supporting parts in the show's first season. Nancy Cartwright, the voice of Bart, commented on Roswell's acting: "Maggie has been blessed with a skill in creating one of the hardest things to create: the 'normal sound', whatever that is. So she can easily slip into the gal next door."

== Reception ==
"Dead Putting Society" originally aired on the Fox network in the United States on November 15, 1990. In its original American broadcast, the episode finished 35th in the ratings for the week of November 12–18, 1990, with a Nielsen rating of 14.3, equivalent to approximately 13.3 million viewing households. It was the highest-rated show on Fox that week.

Since airing, the episode has received positive reviews from television critics. Doug Pratt, a DVD reviewer and Rolling Stone contributor, praised the episode as one of the best from season two. He commented that the miniature golf challenges "are delightful, the denouement is highly amusing ... and the beauty of the whole episode is that it could just as easily be an episode in a live action TV sitcom, though the slight touches of fancy enabled by the animation enhance its comic impact." Dusty Sanders of the Rocky Mountain News commented that the title of the episode is "funnier than the content of most TV sitcoms". DVD Movie Guide's Colin Jacobson commented that "considering what a prominent character Flanders became, it's strange to realize that 'Dead Putting Society' was the first show to feature him heavily. He'd made some token appearances in the past—most notably in season one's 'Call of the Simpsons'—but 'Dead Putting Society' much more clearly defined the Ned we'd come to know and love. It also featured scads of good little bits and gags and seemed like a solid program."

The authors of the book I Can't Believe It's a Bigger and Better Updated Unofficial Simpsons Guide, Gary Russell and Gareth Roberts, commented that apart from "the memorable lawn mowing sequence at the end, this episode is notable for our first viewing of the gaudy, gadget-filled, God-fearing splendour that is the Flanderses' home." The Orlando Sentinel's Gregory Hardy named it the ninth best episode of the show with a sports theme. The reference to The Karate Kid was named the 21st greatest film reference in the history of the show by Total Film's Nathan Ditum.

== Sources ==
- Groening, Matt (October 28, 2010). Richmond, Ray; Gimple, Scott M.; McCann, Jessie L.; Seghers, Christine; Bates, James W. (eds.). Simpsons World: The Ultimate Episode Guide: Seasons 1–20 (1st ed.). HarperCollins. ISBN 9780061711282.
