= The Flandshees of Innersimpson =

- The Simpsons episode
- Episode no.: Season 36; Episode 12
- Directed by: Chris Clements
- Written by: Dan Vebber
- Production code: 36ABF05
- Original air date: March 30, 2025

Guest appearances
- Rachel Bloom as Annette; Jane Kaczmarek as Judge Constance Harm; Fiona Shaw as Mrs. McCormick

Episode chronology
← Previous "The Past and the Furious"	Next → "The Last Man Expanding"
- The Simpsons season 36

"The Flandshees of Innersimpson" is the twelfth episode of the thirty-sixth season of the American animated television series The Simpsons, and the 783rd episode overall. It aired in the United States on Fox on March 30, 2025. The episode was written by Dan Vebber and directed by Chris Clements.

In this episode, Flanders stops speaking to Homer after his scheme to make Bart a DJ prevents him from sleeping. Rachel Bloom, Jane Kaczmarek, and Fiona Shaw guest starred. The episode received positive reviews.

== Plot ==
When Homer sees billboards for DJ residencies and learns that they make millions of dollars each night, he enlists Bart to become a DJ so he can get a mansion through Bart's earnings. Bart practices in the basement in the middle of the night. After Marge complains about the noise, Homer advertises Bart's residency in his treehouse, and he performs for the town's children. Flanders asks Homer to have Bart be quieter, but Homer ignores him. The next day, Flanders buys noise-cancelling headphones for himself and his sons, but Homer borrows them from him. That night, the Simpsons sleep with the headphones during the performance while the Flanders are kept awake. In the morning, the Simpsons awaken to a destroyed treehouse because the performance became too loud. Because of the noise, an enraged Flanders quits speaking to Homer.

Homer appears pleased but keeps talking about the situation with Marge. Over the next nine months, he tries to get Flanders to talk to him but fails. Marge tries to discuss the situation with Flanders, but, after presenting his argument, Marge agrees with Flanders. She tells Homer to apologize, so he writes a letter of apology to Flanders, but it makes him even more angry. Ned takes back all the items that Homer has borrowed and destroys them, saying he allowed Homer to borrow his things because he thought Homer did not know better. However, upon reading the letter he realized that Homer knew what he was doing was wrong. Trying to stop him, Homer accidentally rams his car into Flanders', touching off a war against each other.

Later, Judge Constance Harm sentences Homer and Flanders to couples counseling. The therapist, Annette, gives them a psychedelic drug for therapy. In their joint hallucination, they appear as various famous duos before battling an army of each other. They enter each other's castle to discover a shrine to the other one. They realize that Flanders is happy and successful, and Homer feels unworthy of him, so he treats him poorly; while Flanders wishes he had the ability to savor life as much as Homer does but likes feeling superior to him, so he enables Homer's behavior. They realize they want to return to their original relationship and forgive each other.

== Production ==
During the end credits, a mashup of songs performed over the course of the series was shown to be performed by Bart. The mashup was produced by production duo The Hood Internet.

Rachel Bloom guest starred as Annette, Jane Kaczmarek guest starred as Judge Constance Harm, and Fiona Shaw guest starred as Mrs. McCormick.

== Cultural references ==
The episode title refers to the 2022 film The Banshees of Inisherin.

Among the duos shown in the hallucination were Itchy & Scratchy, Buzz Lightyear and Woody, Bert and Ernie, Batman and Robin, Mr. Burns and Waylon Smithers, Simon & Garfunkel, Chewbacca and Han Solo, He-Man and Skeletor, Abbott and Costello, Tattoo and Mr. Roarke, Garfield and Odie, Daryl Hall and John Oates, Napoleon Dynamite and Pedro Sanchez, Jesse Pinkman and Walter White, Frodo Baggins and Samwise Gamgee, Pikachu and Ash Ketchum, and Lucy Van Pelt and Charlie Brown.

== Reception ==
=== Viewing figures ===
The episode earned a 0.14 rating and was watched by 0.62 million viewers, which was the second-most watched show on Fox that night.

=== Critical response ===
John Schwarz of Bubbleblabber gave the episode a 9 out of 10. He highlighted the car fight scene and the drug therapy sequence. Mike Celestino of Laughing Place liked the episode but wanted the Bart plot to "have been more grounded". He highlighted the mashup of classic Simpsons songs over the end credits. Brandon Zachary of Screen Rant commented that the episode changes one thing about Homer and the Nerd's first meeting in "Lisa's First Word" regarding how Homer got his couch, calling it a continuity error. However, he added, "'The Flandshees of Innersimpson' tackles the idea cleverly, highlighting how their relationship has stagnated for years despite numerous episodes in which they finally learn to empathize. It even highlights how both men return to normal after each fight."

In another article, he highlights the relationship between the Flanders family in the episode, especially with Lisa and Todd, since "This also adds a sweet touch to the bond they forge despite the dispute between their parents. I hope that future seasons of The Simpsons continue to show this connection between Lisa and Todd, and even give them a full episode where they can star together." Nick Valdez of Comicbook.com ranked the episode fifth on his list of all episodes of the season. He praised the rivalry between Homer and Ned, calling it "great," and commented, "It's a complex relationship where neither side really benefits, but without the other, they fall apart. It's a unique and effective way to look at the couple, even after all these years." Lloyd Farley of Collider said that the Nerd had previously had an angry streak in the season 26 episodes "Bull-E" and season 8's "Hurricane Neddy." But he said that this episode "overshadows both of those examples," concluding, "So while the finale sees the frenemies reconcile, content to live with the status quo, we've seen what Ned is capable of—what if he ever shows up again? Hell!"
