= Flanderization =

Concept in media studies

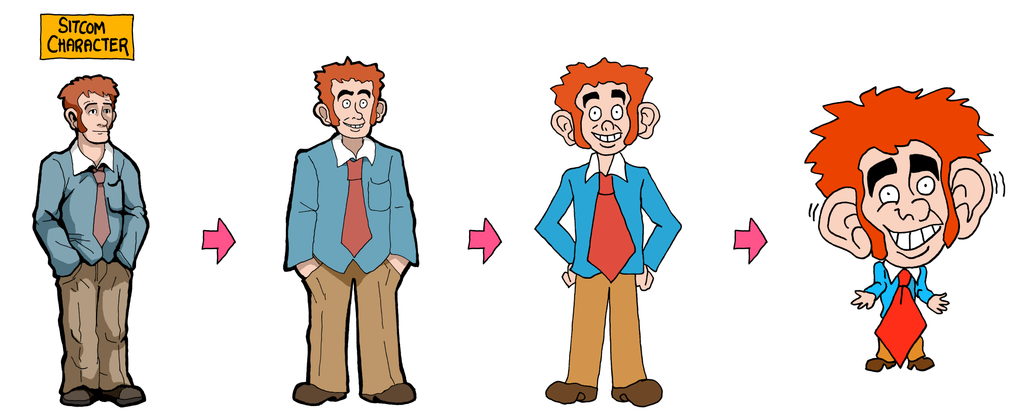
A visual demonstration of Flanderization; over time, certain features of the character are exaggerated, and the character becomes merely a caricature of their initial self.

Flanderization is the process through which a fictional character's essential traits are oversimplified and exaggerated over a serial work.

The term Flanderization was coined by TV Tropes in reference to Ned Flanders of The Simpsons, who was increasingly caricatured over the show's run from a friendly and good-hearted Christian neighbor, among other characteristics, into a dogmatic, evangelical "Bible-thumper".

Flanderization is often associated with and cited as a consequence of "jumping the shark", a term used to demonstrate a creative work's gradual decline in quality which leads to a sudden decline in popularity.

== Definition and etymology ==
Flanderization is the process through which a single element of a character's personality, often an originally mild element, is inflated in importance over the course of a work until it becomes the character's primary defining trait. It is cited as the opposite of character development, or as character derailment. The term was coined by TV Tropes, a wiki that collects and documents descriptions and examples of plot conventions and devices in fiction and pop culture, in reference to the character of Ned Flanders from The Simpsons.

Flanders himself is a complex example of Flanderization, having undergone the process in the middle seasons of the show before once again returning to a similar portrayal to his original one. Originating as "perhaps the only genuinely well-meaning, good-natured person in Springfield", Flanders was originally intended to be an ideal ("annoyingly perfect") neighbor who served as a contrast and foil for Homer Simpson. As a devoutly religious and church-going man, his faith was intended to serve as a contrast to Homer's lack of religious sophistication. However, over the course of the show's run, Flanders was simplified into a religious fundamentalist whose Christianity was his primary defining characteristic.

While Flanderization is primarily discussed in the context of fictional characters, it has also been applied to real people and historical events.

== Examples ==
Flanderization is named after Ned Flanders in The Simpsons.

Flanderization is a widespread phenomenon in serialized fiction. In its originating show of The Simpsons, it has been discussed both in the context of Ned Flanders and as relating to other characters; Lisa Simpson has been discussed as a classic example of the phenomenon, having debatably been even more Flanderized than Flanders himself. The specific case of Ned Flanders has been discussed as a symptom of the general decline of The Simpsons, once one of the most popular sitcoms in television history and once known for how dynamic its characters were. Other works have also been criticized as going through Flanderization, usually (but not exclusively) in television series. Several characters in the American version of The Office, such as Kevin Malone, have been referred to by the term. Dinesh from Silicon Valley is a lesser example of Flanderization, specifically in the show's final two seasons with the departure of T.J. Miller as Erlich Bachman.

"It's ironic that the act of reducing a character to a single trait is called 'Flanderization', when Lisa Simpson is the most Flanderized character in TV history."

— Amelia Tait, Vice News

Outside of The Simpsons, Family Guy has been highlighted as one of the most prominent examples in animation, particularly with the characters of Peter and Brian Griffin. Peter was originally portrayed as an outrageous and goofy but caring member of the Griffin family, but over time his personality shifted to being increasingly crude, mean-spirited, and offensive. Brian, originally portrayed as being the witty, intelligent, and sarcastic voice-of-reason, became pretentious, narcissistic, and hypocritical. Other animated series criticized for Flanderization include SpongeBob SquarePants and The Fairly OddParents.

Though the primary reference for Flanderization is in television, other fictional media can also have characters exhibit Flanderization. Many film characters have been described as being Flanderized in a sequel or franchise compared to their original portrayal. Flanderization in cinema is particularly prevalent in horror films, especially slasher films, an example being Jason Voorhees. Flanderization has also been described as a pitfall for tabletop role-playing games, where complex characters are often played for long periods of time by amateur writers. The practice of building roleplay characters around single quirks has been mentioned as a frequent cause of Flanderization. As well as player characters, non-player characters in role-playing games are frequently Flanderized, due to the need for a single game master to play multiple characters.

Flanderization has also been discussed in the context of real-world phenomena, such as subcultures that are Flanderized by the mainstream culture into simpler and more accessible forms; one example of this is the beatnik stereotype of the Beat Generation. Another example of real-world Flanderization is the tendency for musicians, especially those associated with social media such as TikTok and SoundCloud, to simplify their musical personas after finding some commercial success. Musicians accused of Flanderization include Lil Pump, Lil Yachty, and Flo Milli.

== Interpretation ==
Flanderization has been described as symptomatic of a franchise becoming a long-running one, leading to a decline in writing quality as writers struggle to come up with new ideas. While minor characters may be given more of a spotlight, the franchise may also fall back on the easy tropes of its established characters, leading to Flanderization. It has been used as an argument against making sequels for a work and described as "a lesson for other shows" whose characters have not gone through the process. Some works have consciously attempted to avoid Flanderization, such as Rick and Morty.

== See also ==
- Characterization
- Radicalization
- Typecasting
- Stock character
