= The Past and the Furious =

- The Simpsons episode
- Promotional poster for the episode
- Directed by: Mike Frank Polcino
- Written by: Rob LaZebnik
- Production code: 35ABF19
- Original release date: February 12, 2025
- Running time: 23 minutes

Guest appearance
- Joseph Gordon-Levitt as young Mr. Burns

Episode chronology
| ← Previous "Bottle Episode" | Next → "The Flandshees of Innersimpson" |
- The Simpsons season 36

"The Past and the Furious" is the second special of the thirty-sixth season of the American animated television series The Simpsons. The 782nd episode overall, it was first released exclusively on the American streaming service Disney+ on February 12, 2025. The episode was written by Rob LaZebnik and directed by Mike Frank Polcino, with Joseph Gordon-Levitt guest starring as young Mr. Burns.

In the episode, Lisa attempts to return plant life to Springfield by time traveling to the past, where she meets a young Mr. Burns (Gordon-Levitt) and tries to stop the current Mr. Burns (Harry Shearer) from destroying the town's ecosystem.

With its unique premise, the episode was much more experimental than what the series had done before, as noted by Matt Selman. Gordon-Levitt was a fan of The Simpsons, and heavily enjoyed his time as young Mr. Burns, especially getting to act alongside Yeardley Smith. Upon release, the episode received generally positive reviews from critics.

== Plot ==
In an alternate, dystopian reality, middle child Lisa Simpson is trying to grow some plants, but Springfield's nuclear power plant owner Mr. Burns stops her. Concerned about her mental health, her parents Homer and Marge take her to a therapist. Lisa is given Eye Movement Desensitization and Reprocessing stimulators and is transported into the body of a girl named Edith in 1923. She performs on the saxophone with a young Mr. Burns at the Little Moose Club, named after tiny moose that live in the town, with everyone hating the animals for being annoying. Lisa and Mr. Burns commemorate the experience by writing in wet cement. Then, Lisa wakes up and takes the stimulators home. She discovers that the club really existed and Edith is her ancestor, also finding the cement writing, leading her to conclude that she time traveled.

Lisa discusses her experience with scientist Professor Frink, who believes Lisa was meant to change the past. She learns that the moose became extinct in 1925, which led to the collapse of Springfield's ecosystem. She uses the stimulators to return to 1923 to try and save them, finding Mr. Burns in a greenhouse, tending to orchids. Wishing to sing instead of becoming a tycoon like he was meant to, Mr. Burns helps Lisa convince the townsfolk to save the moose by creating a sanctuary. Waking up, Lisa is shocked to learn that the moose now became extinct in 1923. However, Marge, worried that Lisa is becoming delusional, hides the stimulators from her. After Lisa's brother Bart gets them back for her, she returns to 1923, and tries to rally the townsfolk with a megaphone, but she accidentally scares the moose into destroying Mr. Burns' orchids. Angered, he vows to become a tycoon and pave over the town.

At the power plant in the present, Lisa tries to reason with Mr. Burns but fails. At Homer's workstation, she tries again in the past, but present Mr. Burns takes Lisa's stimulators to inhabit his younger self. Present Mr. Burns convinces younger Mr. Burns to stay on his tycoon path after Homer wakes Lisa up, and Mr. Burns destroys the stimulators. Later, Lisa finds a message telling her to go to the basement of Moe's, a local bar. She finds a letter from young Mr. Burns, who left her orchids seeds and funding for a park. One year later, Lisa has successfully created an orchid garden that Mr. Burns secretly enjoys.

== Production ==
"The Past and the Furious" was written by Rob LaZebnik and directed by Mike Frank Polcino. In August 2024, it was announced that four original episodes of The Simpsons for exclusive release on the American streaming service Disney+ had been ordered, with "The Past and the Furious" being one of the four initially-revealed specials. Ahead of its release, the official poster for the episode was unveiled on January 31, 2025. The therapist, Dr. Chaplet, was named after the character Dodo Chaplet from the 1960s Doctor Who, a series that, similar to "The Past and the Furious", is based around time travel.

Executive producer Matt Selman described the episode as a "time travel adventure", noting it as being more "experimental" than the crew was used to. In the episode, Joseph Gordon-Levitt plays the young version of Mr. Burns, an experience he called a "lifelong dream". Gordon-Levitt was "honored" to play the character, and described himself as a fan of the series. When recording for the episode, he only read his lines alongside Yeardley Smith, highlighting his experience with her and how "fun" it was to find the voice for Mr. Burns. Months prior to the episode's release, Pamela Hayden announced that she had retired from her role as the character of Milhouse. Despite having already been recast in the main series by February 2025, Hayden made another "secret" appearance as the character in the special, since it was produced before her retirement. The episode's format is presented in the same way as the previous special episodes, with someone navigating a fake streaming service full of movie parodies incorporating Simpsons-based puns into the title before ultimately choosing the episode, with the streaming service being WuHu, a fictional spoof of Hulu.

== Release and reception ==
The official logo for the special.

"The Past and the Furious" first premiered on Disney+ on February 12, 2025. It was the second special for the platform after "O C'mon All Ye Faithful", both for the season and the series as a whole. The special also marked the first new episode of The Simpsons since December 2024, and was released over a month before the next regular episode of the series aired on the Fox Network. Upon its release, some viewers reported that they were unable to find the episode in Disney+'s UI, finding it to be complicated. The special was not given its own page or put under the season 36 sub-section, rather sharing its own subsection with "O C'mon All Ye Faithful" in the "Exclusives" tab of the page for the main series. ComicBook.com writer Nick Valdez criticized this way of handling the special's release, calling it "so tucked away" that many subscribers might not know that it exists.

Cathal Gunning of ScreenRant found the episode to be much darker than anticipated, feeling that the conclusion of Lisa getting a "pretty pathetic" orchid garden was underwhelming. Gunning felt the episode was "uniquely bleak", especially after multiple previous episodes have shown Lisa coming out on top and successfully achieving her goals, also criticizing the decision to have Mr. Burns get a seemingly happy ending in spite of him being the villain character. Despite his initial criticism of its release, Nick Valdez still recommended it to fans of the series, lauding its "unique" premise. Ranking each of the season's Disney+ specials, Collider writer J.S. Gornael placed "The Past and the Furious" in the top spot, praising the opening WuHu sequence, the song Lisa and young Mr. Burns sing, and the "wholesome" ending. Finding Lisa's characterization in the episode to be a highlight, Gornael commended the episode for having such high quality for a modern episode of the series.
