= Pork and Burns =

- The Simpsons episode
- Episode no.: Season 28; Episode 11
- Directed by: Matthew Nastuk
- Written by: Rob LaZebnik
- Production code: WABF06
- Original air date: January 8, 2017

Guest appearances
- Joyce Carol Oates as herself; Michael York as Dr. Budgie

Episode features
- Couch gag: The Simpsons sit down on the couch that is revealed to be a sticker on a "Couch Gag Play Set". The set is between other Simpsons merchandise (t-shirt, couches, snow globes, hats, stand-up figures and a Simpsons Video Game). Bart asks Marge to get one, but Marge refuses, even if it's 3 for $1.

Episode chronology
← Previous "The Nightmare After Krustmas"	Next → "The Great Phatsby"
- The Simpsons season 28

"Pork and Burns" is the eleventh episode of the twenty-eighth season of the American animated television series The Simpsons, and the 607th episode of the series overall. The episode was directed by Matthew Nastuk and written by Rob LaZebnik. It aired in the United States on Fox on January 8, 2017.

In this episode, Mr. Burns bonds with Plopper and refuses to return it to Homer while Lisa starts getting rid of all her possessions. Michael York guest starred as Dr. Budgie. Writer Joyce Carol Oates appeared as herself. The episode received mixed reviews.

== Plot ==
The Simpsons go to the Springfield Car Wash, and Marge buys a book called The Japanese Warrior Monks Guide to Tidying Up. Homer buys some sushi and ends up in the hospital. The family reunites at home and she makes the family follow the book's teaching, giving up everything that doesn't give them joy any more. Lisa gives up some of her Malibu Stacy dolls, Bart tells Marge all his stuff gives him joy, while Homer gives up his Mr. Plow jacket. Marge however tells him he has to give up his pig Plopper, and find him a new place to live, so he puts an announcement on Gregslist. The first one to inquire Snake, but Homer refuses, getting in a panel van to navigate back home.

Bart, Lisa and Homer take Plopper to Luigi's and see Joyce Carol Oates at a table, but when trying to enter with the pig, Luigi forbids them, unless Plopper becomes a therapy animal. Homer prepares to make Plopper one, but Lisa gets worried of him getting in trouble and gets an anxiety attack. Homer gets the idea to get a prescription for anxiety at Dr. Bud's Medicinal Marijuana Clinic, but he turns out to be a charlatan, so he turns to Dr. Nick, who gives him some pills. Meanwhile, Homer says to Marge that he will bring him everywhere he goes, including work, so she will not see him for long anymore. Meanwhile, Lisa gets rid of every object in her room and finds out that her saxophone does not give her joy anymore.

At the Springfield nuclear family day picnic, Lisa gives up her saxophone. Plopper gets greased up by kids, leading to Mr. Burns' hounds attacking him, and biting his back. Dr. Budgie visits him, and to avoid a lawsuit, Burns and Smithers agree to take care of him. Back at home, Lisa is empty of any joy since she gave away all of her stuff, so Bart helps her at school, playing the music she likes over the intercom. She gets her joy back, but is missing her stuff, so Marge takes her to Springfield Lock 'N' Leave Storage Facility and reveals she kept all the stuff there, and go and retrieve them.

At Burns Manor, Dr. Budgie gives Plopper a makeover, and Burns has some great moments with the pig, becoming reluctant to give him up once he recovers. Homer comes to check on him and sees Burns dancing with him. He then returns to the manor that evening and gets back his animal friend with Bart's and later Smithers' help, and to keep him he says to Marge he will give up beer.

== Production ==
Michael York reprised his role as Dr. Budgie, who was first seen in the twenty-seventh season episode "Lisa the Veterinarian." Writer Joyce Carol Oates appears as herself.

== Cultural references ==
Marge's book is a parody of Marie Kondo's book The Life-Changing Magic of Tidying Up: The Japanese Art of Decluttering and Organizing.

Homer has a nightmare of a Hellman's Mayonnaise cartoon, parodying the opening theme to ER.

== Reception ==
Dennis Perkins of The A.V. Club gave the episode a B− stating, "But why graft three full stories (and possibly a fourth) together into one resultingly cluttered episode? It’s a common complaint, but a lot of recent Simpsons episodes waste promising storylines this way. You’ve got Homer and his pig buddy, coming back together before a barbeque sauce-and-hounds mishaps leads to Mr. Burns taking a shine to the injured Plopper. But that’s only set up by Marge’s enthusiasm for a Japanese anti-cluttering book/philosophy that sees her urging the family to toss out anything that 'no longer brings them joy' (that’s an episode), which leads to Lisa discovering that, once she’s given away everything but her sax (and her Bleeding Gums Murphy poster), she’s lost all joy in playing. 'I finally feel about my sax the way you all do!,' she wails in horror. And that’s another episode. Throw in some promising emotional beats to that story—Homer comforts the confused Lisa during an anxiety attack, Bart hijacks the school’s PA system to restore her love for jazz—and there’s an abundance of good ideas not given enough time to come to fruition."

Tony Sokol of Den of Geek gave the episode 4.5 out of 5 stars. He called the episode a future classic filled with jokes.

"Pork and Burns" scored a 3.5 rating with an 11 share and was watched by 8.19 million viewers, making it Fox's highest rated show of the night.
