= P.S. I Hate You (The Simpsons) =

- The Simpsons episode
- Episode no.: Season 36; Episode 16
- Directed by: Mike Frank Polcino
- Written by: Cesar Mazariegos
- Production code: 36ABF07
- Original air date: April 13, 2025

Guest appearances
- Beverly D'Angelo as Lurleen Lumpkin; Jon Lovitz as Artie Ziff; Tim Meadows as himself

Episode chronology
← Previous "The Last Man Expanding"	Next → "Yellow Planet"
- The Simpsons season 36

"P.S. I Hate You" is the fourteenth episode of the thirty-sixth season of the American animated television series The Simpsons, and the 785th episode overall. It aired in the United States on Fox on April 13, 2025. The episode was written by Cesar Mazariegos and directed by Mike Frank Polcino.

In this episode, Marge is blackmailed when the hateful letters she writes about the townsfolk are stolen. Beverly D'Angelo, Jon Lovitz, and Tim Meadows guest starred. The episode received positive reviews.

== Plot ==
Helen Lovejoy catches Marge shopping at the dollar store for utensils for her birthday party because she spent most of her money on food. After Helen insults Marge for shopping there, an angry Marge drives home, goes into her bedroom, and returns with a happy attitude. The family wonders what she does to calm herself down.

That evening, her party is held in the backyard with the entire town in attendance while Shauna Chalmers babysits the town's children in the living room. Mayor Quimby declares Marge "the nicest lady in Springfield". The next day, Marge discovers her secret box of hateful letters has gone missing. She tells her family she learned a method of releasing her anger by writing a hateful letter to her offender and storing it in a box. She receives a message telling her to pay $5,000 for the letters, or they would be publicly released.

With the police unable to help and unwilling to lose her reputation, Marge goes to Patty and Selma for money, but they refuse and tell her to release her anger occasionally. At the deadline, Homer tells the blackmailer they refuse to pay. Attending church service, Helen reads the letter that Marge wrote to her after it was left on her door that morning, but her name has been removed. Helen accuses Agnes Skinner of writing it, but she denies it and forces Principal Skinner to fight Reverend Lovejoy. Marge receives another message telling her she has one hour before the letters are released. Hearing a familiar phrase, she realizes that Shauna stole the letters after Marge prevented Shauna from eating the party food. Shauna and Jimbo decided to hold the letters for ransom so they could run away together.

Knowing Shauna is not at home, Marge and Homer go to her house. While Marge distracts Superintendent Chalmers, Homer sneaks into Shauna's room and retrieves the box. They discover the letters are not in the box but encounter Shauna and Jimbo with the letters. Marge pursues Shauna to a rooftop while Homer fights Jimbo. Shauna holds the backpack of letters off the roof, threatening to drop them into the parade happening on the street below. She admits she was impressed with the letters until she read the one about herself. When asked why Marge saves them, she says they bring her peace. Shauna trips over the ledge, and Marge grabs Shauna with one hand and the letters in the other. She releases the letters to save Shauna, who apologizes. The townsfolk below read the letters. Marge apologizes to them for keeping her feelings to herself. They accept Marge for being an emotionally complex person.

== Production ==
Starting with this episode, Mo Collins took over the role of Jimbo Jones from Pamela Hayden who announced her retirement earlier in the season.

Beverly D'Angelo reprised her role as Lurleen Lumpkin. D'Angelo previously voiced this character in the third season episode "Colonel Homer" and the nineteenth season episode "Papa Don't Leech". Actor Tim Meadows appeared as himself.

== Reception ==
=== Viewing figures ===
The episode earned a 0.16 rating and was watched by 0.59 million viewers, which was the second-most watched show on Fox that night.

=== Critical response ===
John Schwarz of Bubbleblabber gave the episode an 8.5 out of 10. He thought the episode was "compelling dramatic fare" after a slow start and highlighted the direction by Mike Frank Polcino. He thought Mo Collins performed well copying Pamela Hayden's Jimbo and wanted Collins to voice new characters. Marisa Roffman of Give Me My Remote liked that Marge had a healthy way of relieving her anger and liked the dynamic between her and Shauna.

Brandon Zachary of Screen Rant noted that Marge has not been "The Worst Simpson" since the Season 23 episode "At Long Last Leave" and said the story was "so sweet for Marge and the town in general." He concludes by saying, "This extends to modern seasons of The Simpsons, where Marge has become a much more central character. Many of the most emotional episodes of Seasons 35 and 36 have focused on Marge, highlighting her as an independent woman, while also being a wife and mother." Nick Valdez of Comicbook.com ranked the episode third on his list of all episodes of the season. He considered it a reinvention of the Marge character, saying, "It simply has all the ingredients you could want in an effective Marge episode."
