= Ned Flanders Crossing =

Bicycle and pedestrian bridge in Portland, Oregon, U.S.

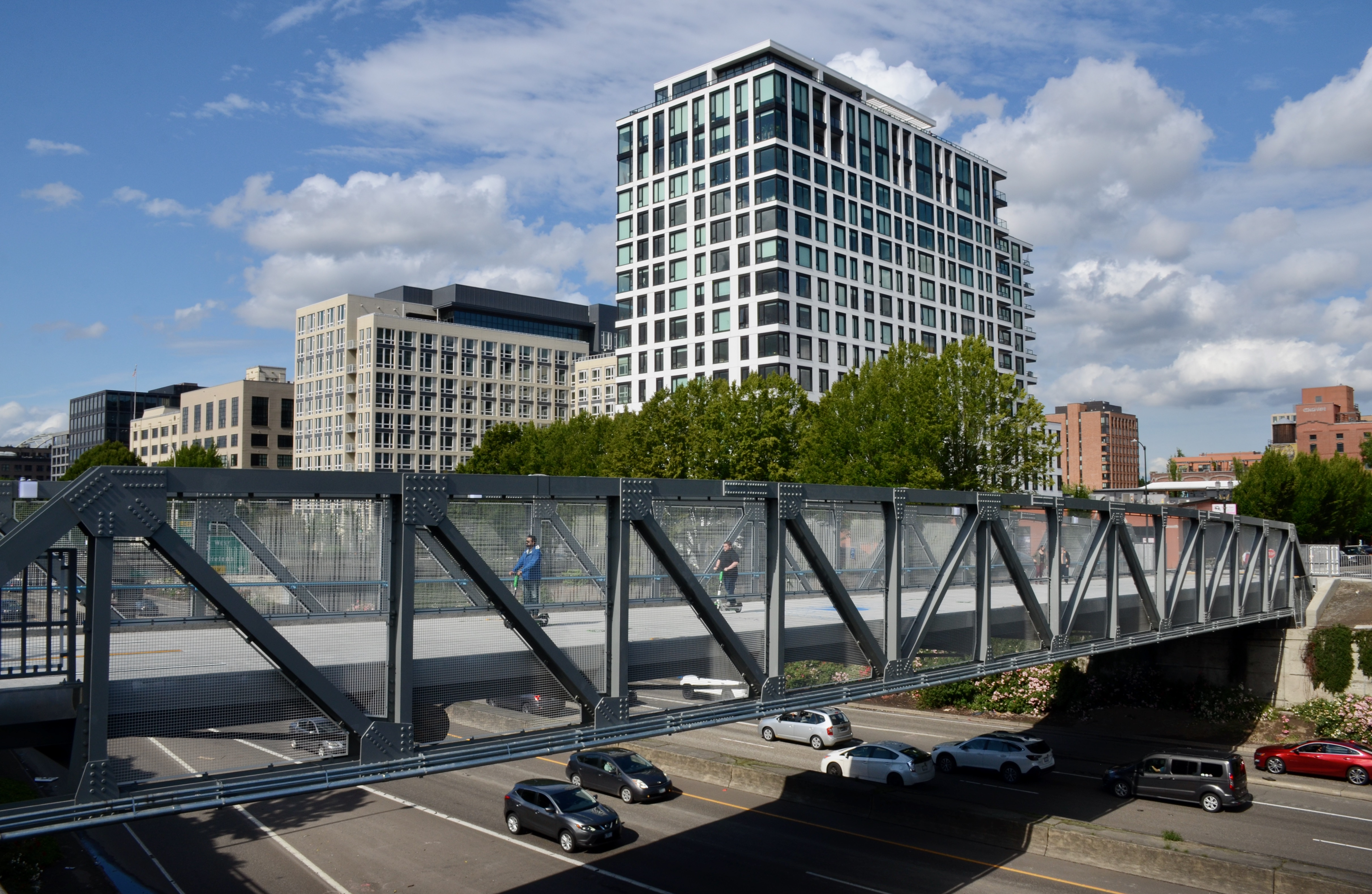
- Viewed from the southwest in June 2021
- Coordinates: 45°31′32″N 122°41′12″W
- Crosses: Interstate 405
- Locale: Portland, Oregon, U.S.

Characteristics
- Total length: 200 ft (61 m)
- Width: 24 ft (7.3 m)

History
- Construction cost: $6 million
- Opened: June 2021

Ned Flanders Crossing is a bicycle and pedestrian bridge spanning Interstate 405 to connect Portland, Oregon's Northwest District and Pearl District, in the United States. In 2019, the project's estimated cost was $6 million. It opened in June 2021 and was originally named Flanders Crossing, as it linked the two parts of Flanders Street separated by the interstate, before being re-dedicated to honor The Simpsons character Ned Flanders (himself named for Flanders Street).

== Description and history ==
The bridge is 200 feet (61 meters) long and 24 feet (7.3 meters) wide.

Construction started in August 2020. The bridge was installed in January 2021, and it was opened to the public on June 4. It was re-dedicated to honor Ned Flanders, a character in The Simpsons and himself named for Flanders Street, in September 2021.

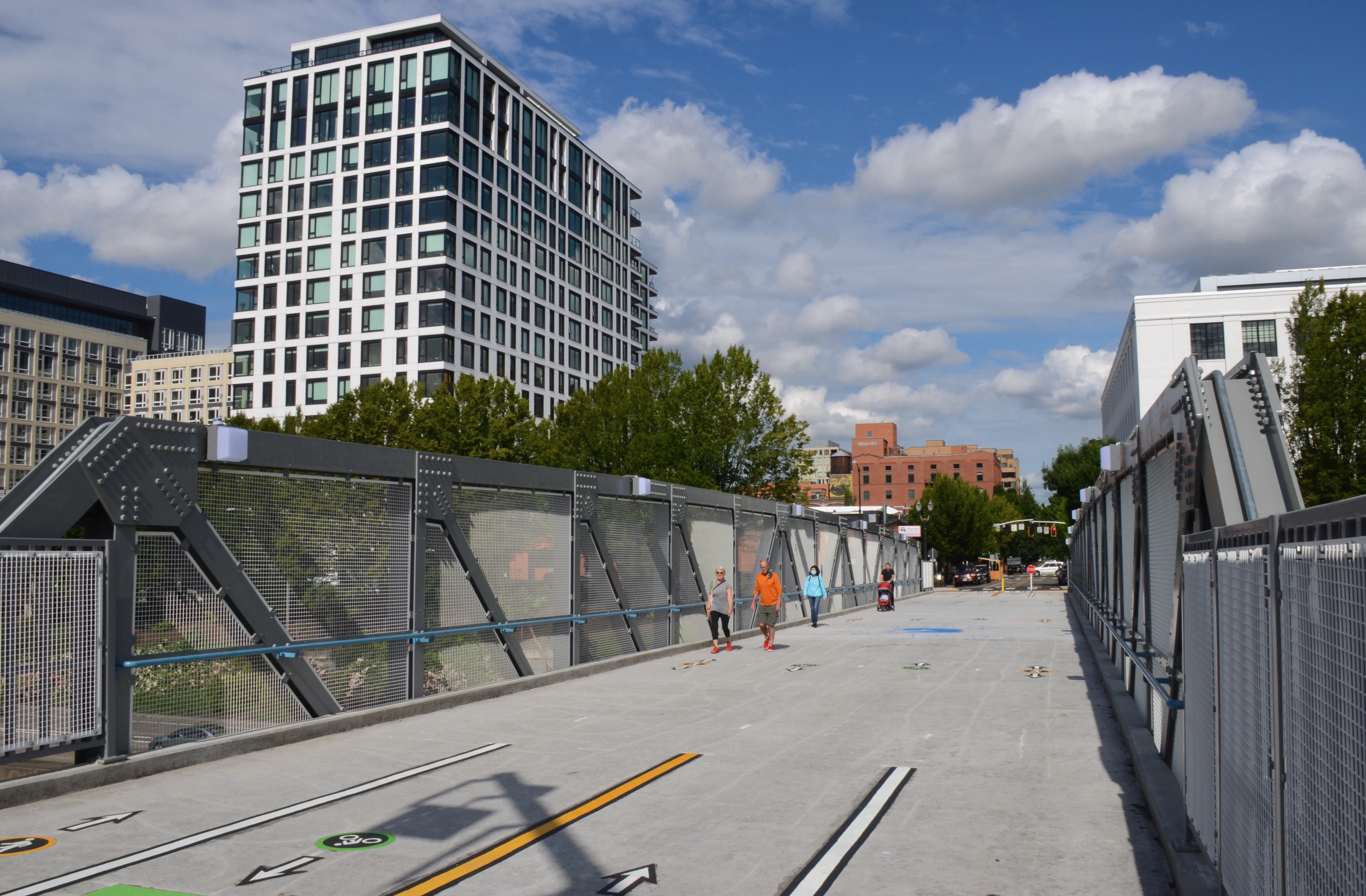
Looking east on the bridge's deck

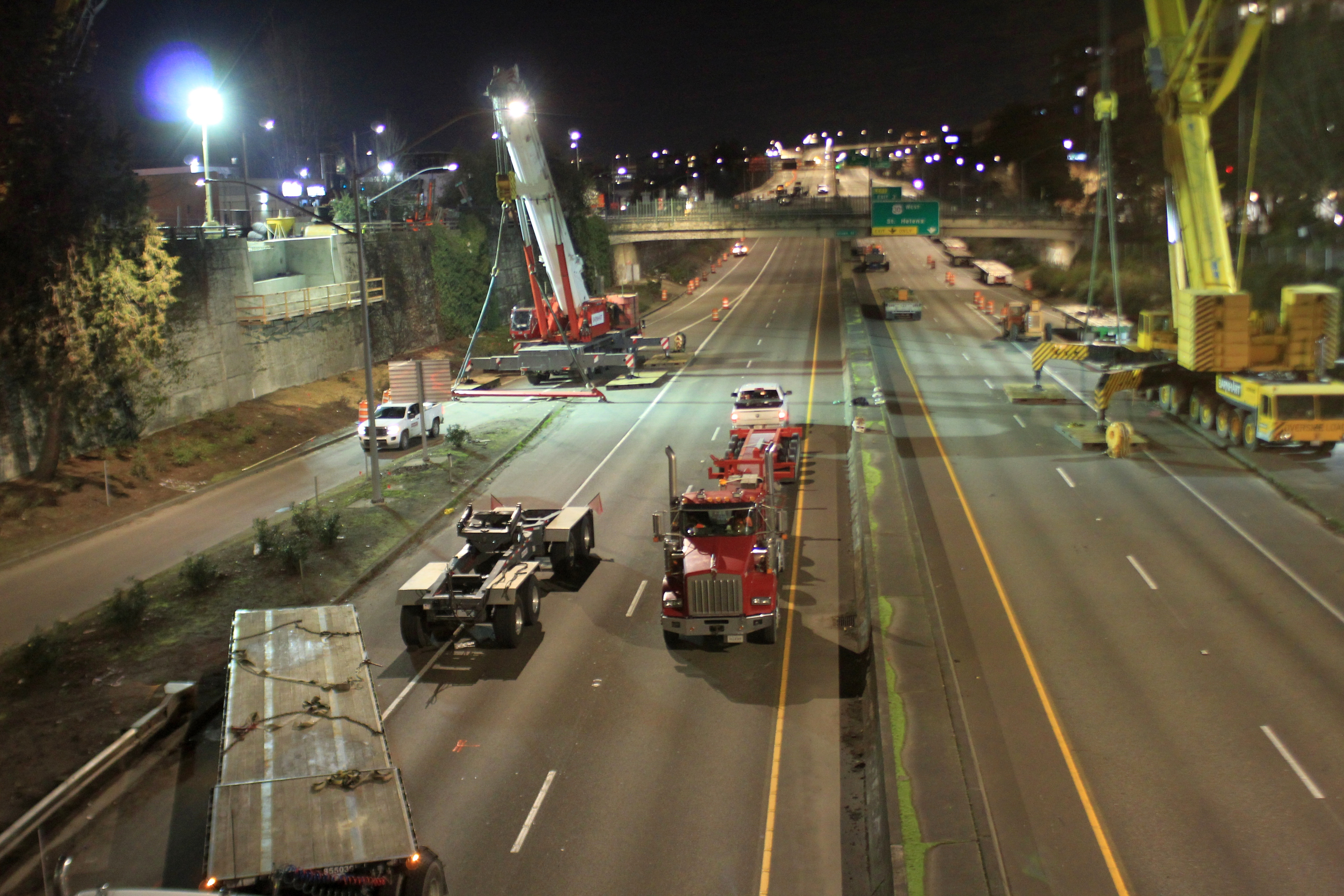
Flanders Crossing site preparation on the night of installation

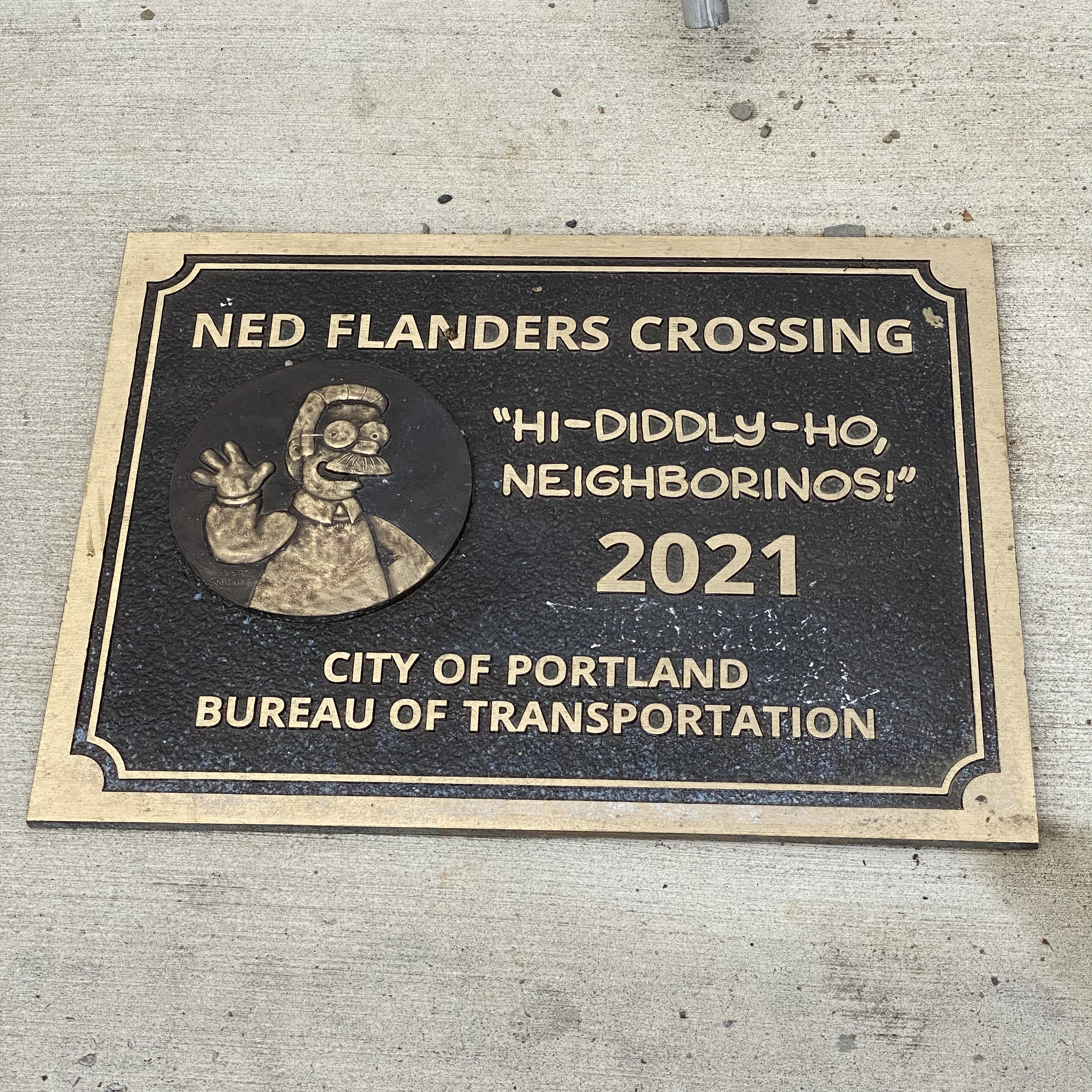
Plaque

== See also ==
- The Simpsons and Portland, Oregon
