= Lark News =

Christian satire website

Lark News is a satire website that lampoons contemporary American Christian culture, specifically evangelicalism. Freelance journalist and author Joel Kilpatrick has run the site and contributed to its content for more than 16 years. In 2005, the website received the Grady Nutt Humor Award from the Gospel Music Association.
