= Rob LaZebnik =

American television producer and writer (born 1962)

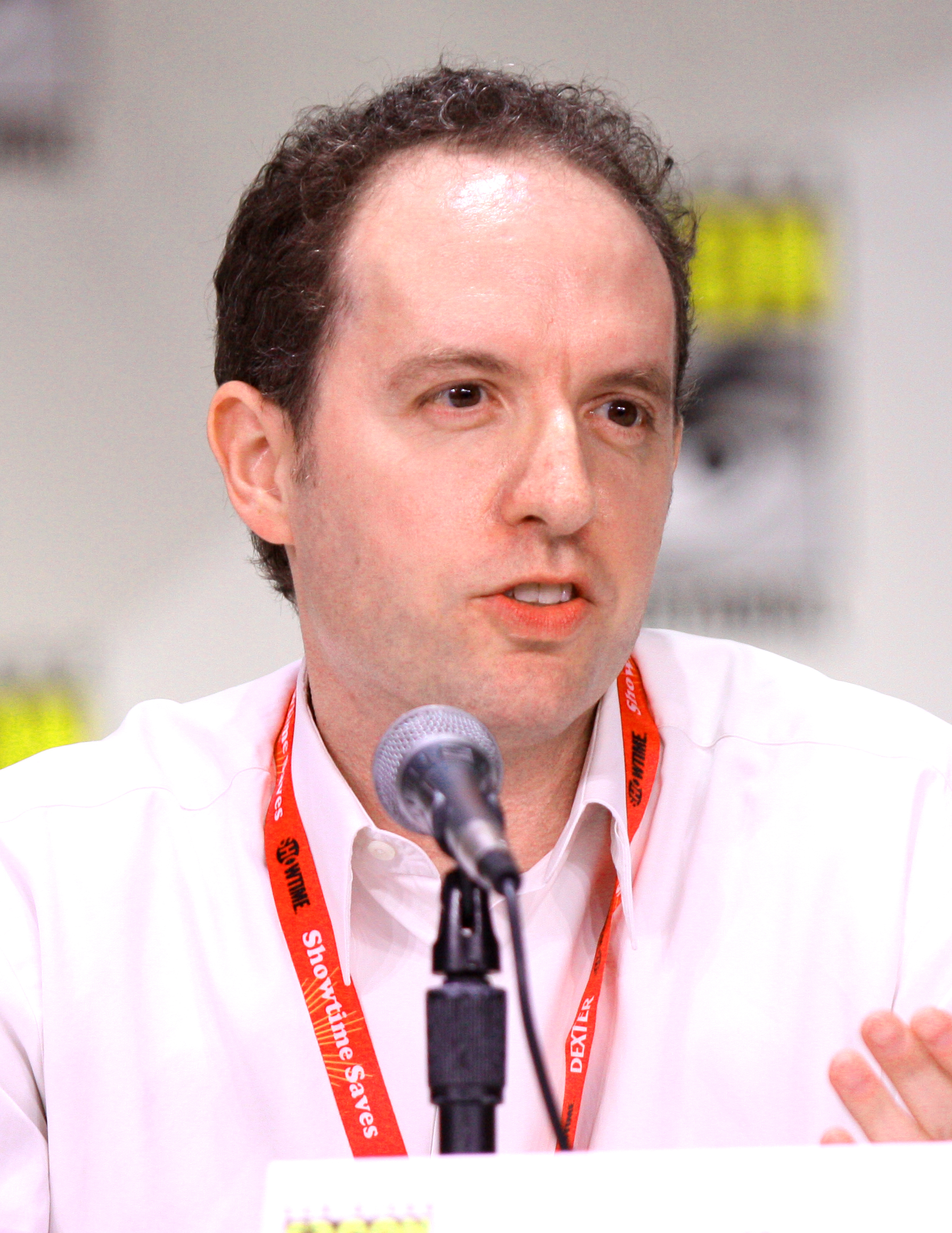
- LaZebnik at San Diego Comic-Con in July 2011.
- Born: May 6, 1962 (age 64)
- Education: Harvard University
- Occupation: Screenwriter
- Spouse: Claire Scovell LaZebnik
- Relatives: Ken LaZebnik (brother); Philip LaZebnik (brother)

Rob LaZebnik (born May 6, 1962) is an American television writer.

== Life and career ==
He graduated from David H. Hickman High School in Columbia, Missouri and Harvard University. He currently works as a co-executive producer on The Simpsons and is credited with having written 26 episodes: "Treehouse of Horror XI" (the "G-G-G-Ghost D-D-D-Dad" segment), "Homer vs. Dignity", "Father Knows Worst", "Boy Meets Curl", "The Blue and the Gray", "The Daughter Also Rises", "The Changing of the Guardian", "The War of Art", "The Kids Are All Fight", "Friend with Benefit", "The Girl Code", "The Burns Cage", "Pork and Burns", "Throw Grampa from the Dane", "Baby You Can't Drive My Car", "101 Mitigations", "E My Sports", "Frinkcoin", "Manger Things", "Burger Kings", "Portrait of a Lackey on Fire", "Thirst Trap: A Corporate Love Story", "Treehouse of Horror XXXV" (the "The Information Rage" segment), "Bottle Episode", "The Past and the Furious", and “Diary of a Chimpy Kid”.

He co-created the Macromedia Flash cartoon series Starship Regulars on Icebox.com, and it was picked up by television network Showtime but never aired. He then co-created the series Greetings from Tucson, which aired for one season on The WB. LaZebnik has also been credited with writing episodes of Monk, The War at Home, Less Than Perfect, The Ellen Show and Empty Nest.

His wife, Claire LaZebnik, is an author and is the sister of television writer Nell Scovell. His son, Johnny LaZebnik, is also a comedy writer who has worked on The Simpsons. His brothers are Ken LaZebnik and Philip LaZebnik.
