= Leonid Lazebnik =

Russian physician

Leonid Borisovich Lazebnik
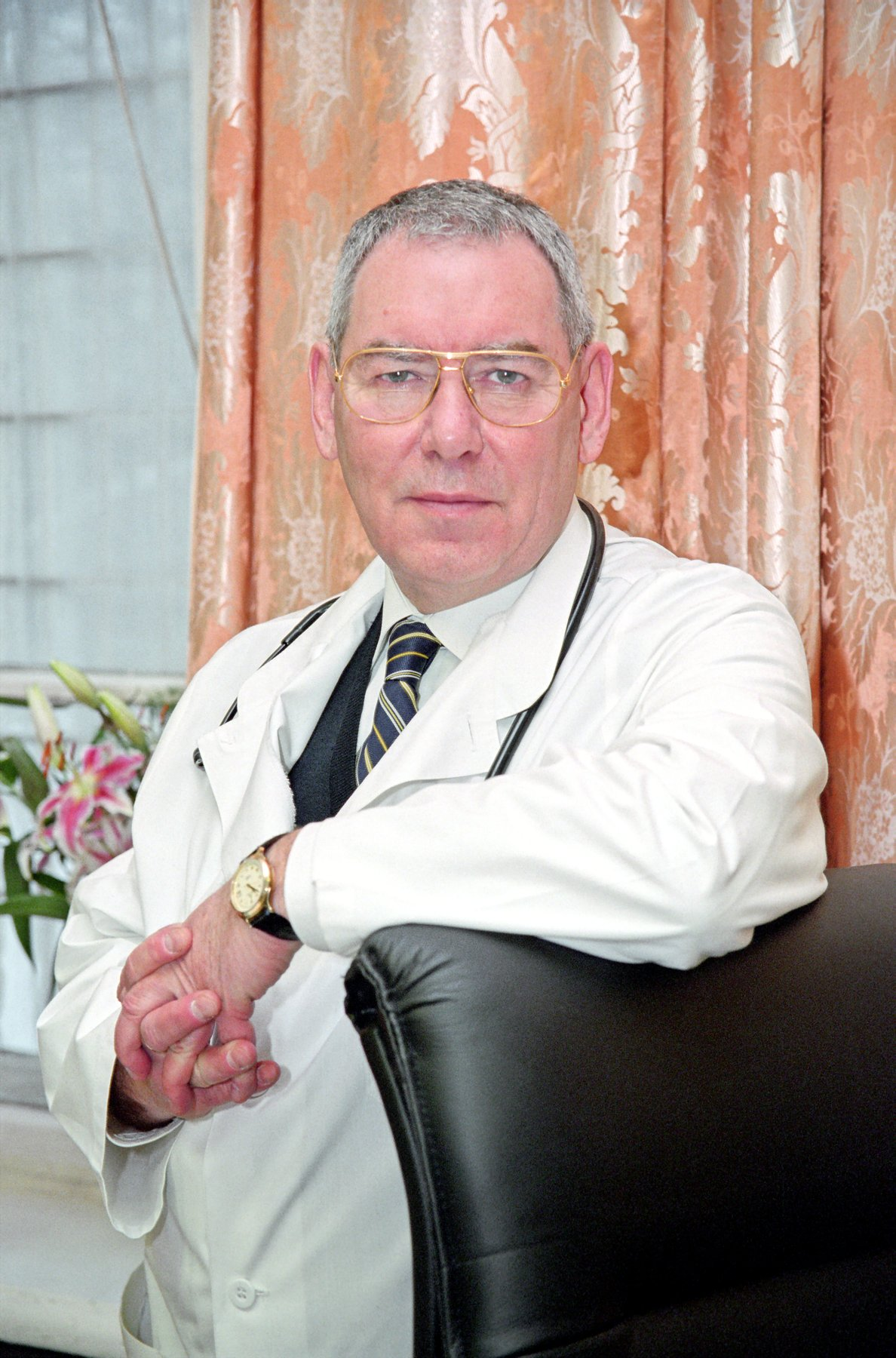
- Born: January 11, 1941 (age 85)
- Education: I.M. Sechenov First Moscow State Medical University
- Awards: 1999 Moscow Government Prize; 2000 Myasnikov Russian Academy of Medical Sciences Prize; Medal "In Commemoration of the 850th Anniversary of Moscow"; Medal "Veteran of Labour"
- Scientific career
- Fields: Gastroenterology, Gerontology
- Workplaces: Russian Central Scientific Research Institute of Gastroenterology, Moscow Department of Healthcare, Moscow State University of Medicine and Dentistry

Leonid Borisovich Lazebnik (Russian: Леонид Борисович Лазебник; born January 11, 1941) is a Russian physician, Doctor of Medical Sciences, Professor at the Moscow State University of Medicine and Dentistry, President of the Gastroenterology Scientific Society of Russia. Laureate of the 1999 Moscow Government Prize and 2000 Myasnikov Russian Academy of Medical Sciences Prize.

== Career ==
He graduated from the I.M. Sechenov First Moscow State Medical University in 1965. In 1971 he defended his Candidat dissertation, and in 1991 he defended his doctoral dissertation. From 1970 to 1994, Lazebnik worked at his alma mater.

From 1993 to 2010, Dr. Lazebnik held the position of Chief Physician of the Moscow Department of Healthcare.

From 1994 to 2001, Lazebnik headed the Department of Gerontology and Geriatrics at the Russian Medical Academy of Postgraduate Education.

From 1995 to 2001, Dr. Lazebnik held the position of Chief Gerontologist of the Ministry of Healthcare of the Russian Federation.

From 2001 to 2012, he served as Director of the Russian Central Scientific Research Institute of Gastroenterology.

He received the Russian Award for Excellence in Health Care.

He is the author of books and articles about apitherapy.
