= Claire Scovell LaZebnik =

American novelist/author

- Born: Newton, Massachusetts, U.S.
- Education: Harvard University
- Occupations: Novelist, author
- Spouse: Rob LaZebnik
- Relatives: Nell Scovell (sister)

Claire Scovell LaZebnik is an American novelist/author. She is the wife of American television writer Rob LaZebnik, with whom she has four children. She is also the sister of television writer Nell Scovell and of children's book writer Alice Scovell Coleman. She was raised in Newton, Mass and attended Newton South High School. She graduated from Harvard University in 1985.

Her novels include Same as It Never Was, Knitting Under the Influence, and The Smart One and the Pretty One, the second of which defunct magazine Romantic Times said "turned into a burdensome cliche". She has co-written two books on autism with Dr. Lynn Kern Koegel of the Koegel Autism Research Center at the University of California at Santa Barbara. In the first, Overcoming Autism, she writes at the end of each chapter about her son, who was diagnosed with autism at age two and a half. In the second, Growing up on the Spectrum (2009), the everyday issues of adolescents with autism are addressed. She co-edited the cookbook SisterWriterEaters with Ann Brown.
