= Throw Grampa from the Dane =

- The Simpsons episode
- Episode no.: Season 29; Episode 20
- Directed by: Mike Frank Polcino
- Written by: Rob LaZebnik
- Production code: XABF13
- Original air date: May 13, 2018

Guest appearance
- Sidse Babett Knudsen as Danish bar woman

Episode features
- Couch gag: Five printers print out papers with Homer on the first one, Marge on the second one, Lisa on the third one, Maggie on the fourth one, and Bart on the fifth one. Suddenly, the first printer malfunctions causing Homer to say "Mmmmmmm, jam."

Episode chronology
← Previous "Left Behind"	Next → "Flanders' Ladder"
- The Simpsons season 29

"Throw Grampa From the Dane" is the twentieth and penultimate episode of the twenty-ninth season of the American animated television series The Simpsons, and the 638th episode of the series overall. The episode was directed by Mike Frank Polcino and written by Rob LaZebnik. It aired in the United States on Fox on May 13, 2018. The title is a takeoff of the film Throw Momma from the Train.

In this episode, the Simpsons take Grampa to Denmark for its socialized medical system, and everyone except Homer considers moving there when they enjoy the culture. Sidse Babett Knudsen guest starred as a Danish bar woman. The episode received negative reviews.

== Plot ==
The Simpsons wake up to find their house completely flooded with water. It is revealed that the night before, Marge asked Homer to help her readjust the position of their sailboat painting. However, they accidentally knocked a nail through one of the water pipes, causing the flood. After the Simpsons receive an insurance payout of $102, and six months' temporary housing while the water damage in their house is being repaired, Grampa asks to use the money to fund an important operation, refusing to discuss what it is. Lisa brings up Denmark's free healthcare, and on Marge's suggestion, the family uses the insurance payout and Homer's vacation time to take a family trip to Denmark for Grampa's operation.

Upon arriving in a wind-powered district of Denmark, the family stay at an Airbnb. The owner proceeds to show them around Copenhagen, visiting places like Amalienborg, Land of Legends and Louisiana Museum of Modern Art. Marge and Lisa are fascinated by their culture, while Bart and Homer make fun of it. Homer learns that although non-Danish people do not necessarily qualify for free healthcare, people who are injured in Denmark are treated for free. Bart, Lisa and Marge begin to contemplate the idea of moving to Denmark for at least one semester, but Homer refuses. The three then storm off, and Homer and Grampa begin to try to get Grampa injured for free treatment, without any success.

At Kronborg Castle, having become accustomed to Danish culture, Marge asks again for Homer to think about moving to Denmark. As he finally begins to consider the possibility, he changes his mind at the last minute and tries to push Grampa down the stairs for his free operation. However, as Grampa clings to Homer's leg, he admits he did not really need a life-threatening operation, but instead tattoo removal on a heart-shaped tattoo dedicated to Mona, as he feels ashamed of living without her. As Homer and Grampa drown their sorrows from Mona's death at a Danish bar, a Danish woman approaches Homer and they proceed to share a dance together. A devastated Marge sees them through the window and runs off, with Homer following her.

Following this, an understanding but angry Marge refuses to come home with Homer, wishing to stay in Denmark with the kids indefinitely. At the airport, Homer begins to regret leaving her in Denmark, but Grampa admits he ruined his marriage to Mona similarly with his stubbornness, advising him not to make the same mistakes he did. The two race back to the apartment where Homer pledges his love for her and vows to stay in Copenhagen with her. However, Marge admits that she is having second thoughts due to problems with space and arrangement in the apartment, and concedes to Homer that she is ready to go home. Homer and Bart agree to go back as well, with only Lisa wanting to stay in Denmark. Before leaving, the family take Grampa to a socialized tattoo parlour, where the tattoo artist refashions his Mona tattoo for free into a lemonade tattoo, giving him a new outlook in life.

== Production ==
Sidse Babett Knudsen guest starred as a woman trying to seduce Homer.

== Reception ==
Dennis Perkins of The A.V. Club gave this episode a C+, stating, "Grampa needs some expensive medical treatment, so the family heads off to a foreign country whose very different economic system allows for inexpensive health care for all. Yes, the Simpsons are heading to Cuba! No, wait, that was last season. Okay, well, once there, the family finds that their new surroundings offer a wealth of cultural benefits that seem almost designed to fulfill needs and dreams each member (but one) didn't even realize they had. Yes, the Simpsons are shipping up to Boston! Dammit, nope—that was season 28 as well. Man, it's almost like the series is out of ideas, completely."

Tony Sokol of Den of Geek gave the episode 2.5 out of 5 stars. He called the episode middling with not enough jokes. He also stated there could have been more commentary on the American health care system.

"Throw Grampa from the Dane" scored a 0.9 rating with a 4 share and was watched by 2.14 million people, making The Simpsons the second most watched show on Fox that night.
