= Sergey Spasokukotsky =

Soviet surgeon (1870–1943)

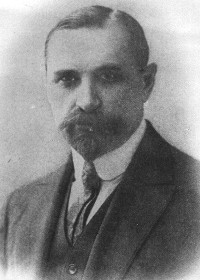
- Spasokukotsky in 1910
- Born: Sergey Ivanovich Spasokukotsky; 10 June 1870; Kostroma, Russian Empire
- Died: 17 November 1943 (aged 73); Moscow, Soviet Union
- Occupation: Surgeon
- Awards: Stalin Prize, 1st class (1942); Order of Lenin (1939); Order of the Red Banner of Labour (1943)

Sergey Ivanovich Spasokukotsky (Russian: Серге́й Иванович Спасокукоцкий, 10 June [O.S. 29 May] 1870 – November 17, 1943) was a Russian and Soviet surgeon and a member of the Academy of Sciences of the Soviet Union since 1942. He was awarded the Stalin Prize for his monograph Lung actinomycosis, along with distinctions (Order of Lenin and Order of the Red Banner of Labour).
