= Philip LaZebnik =

American screenwriter and producer (born 1953)

- Born: February 8, 1953 (age 73); Ann Arbor, Michigan
- Education: Harvard University (BA)
- Occupations: Screenwriter and film producer
- Relatives: Ken LaZebnik (brother); Rob LaZebnik (brother)

Philip LaZebnik (born February 8, 1953) is an American screenwriter and producer. He is known for writing the animated films Pocahontas (1995), Mulan (1998), The Prince of Egypt (1998) and The Road to El Dorado (2000).

== Early life and education ==
He grew up in Columbia, Missouri, attended Hickman High School, and graduated from Harvard College in 1976, with a B.A. in classics. His brothers are Ken LaZebnik and Rob LaZebnik.

== Career ==
LaZebnik has written screenplays for films including Pocahontas, Mulan, The Prince of Egypt, and The Road to El Dorado. LaZebnik also wrote episodes for Wings, Star Trek: The Next Generation, Star Trek: Deep Space Nine, The Torkelsons and Almost Home. LaZebnik has served on the board of directors of the Writers Guild of America West (2001–02) and the Writers Branch Executive Committee of the Academy of Motion Picture Arts and Sciences (2001–03). The screenplay for Mulan won the 1998 Annie Award for best animation screenplay. He has written numerous films and television series in Europe and the US.

He wrote the book for the musical "Fairy Tale" about Hans Christian Andersen with songs by Stephen Schwartz, and wrote the book and lyrics for "Oktoberfest: the Musical" (2016) with music by Harold Faltermeyer. In collaboration with Mads Æbeløe Nielsen he wrote the book for the theatrical musical version of Djævelens lærling (or The Devil's Apprentice), a best-selling Danish fantasy novel of the same name by Kenneth B. Andersen, with songs and music by Madeline Myers.

He co-wrote the book for the theatrical musical "Snow White and Me" with Ronald Kruschwak, music and lyrics by Pippa Cleary, which premiered in Brno, Czech Republic at Meska Divadlo in 2022. He wrote book and lyrics for "Oktoberfest" with music by Harold Faltermeyer, which premiered in Los Angeles and opens in Berlin, Germany at the Renaissance Theatre on July 7, 2024.

He wrote the book for DreamWorks' theatrical musical version of The Prince of Egypt with songs by Stephen Schwartz which opened October 14, 2017, at TheatreWorks in Palo Alto, California and then April 6, 2018, at Fredericia Theatre in Denmark. The Prince of Egypt premiered at the Dominion Theatre in London's West End February 25, 2020. The London West End production was filmed live and is available digitally.

== Filmography ==
=== Film ===
Year	Title	Role
1995	Pocahontas	Writer
1998	Mulan	Writer
1998	The Prince of Egypt	Writer
2000	The Road to El Dorado	Writer
2006	The Lost Treasure of the Knights Templar	Writer
2006	Asterix and the Vikings	Writer
2007	The Treasure of the Templar Knights 2	Writer
2007	The Three Investigators and the Secret of Skeleton Island	Writer
2000	The Treasure of the Templar Knights 3	Writer
2009	The Three Investigators and the Secret of Terror Castle	Writer
2014	Asterix and Obelix: Mansion of the Gods	Writer
2015	Emma and Santa Claus	Writer
2019	The Shamer's Daughter 2	Writer
2022	Richard the Stork and the Mystery of the Great Jewel	Writer
2023	The Prince of Egypt: Live from the West End	Writer

=== Television ===
Year	Title	Role	Notes
1988-1989	Day by Day	Writer	33 episodes
1990-1991	Wings	Writer / Co-producer	5 episodes
1991-1992	The Torkelsons	Writer / Producer	5 episodes
1991	Star Trek: The Next Generation	Writer	2 episodes
1993	Almost Home	Writer / Producer	3 episodes
1994	Star Trek: Deep Space Nine	Writer	Episode: Fascination
2011	Ludwig and Santa Claus	Writer	
2013	Hindenburg: the Last Flight	Writer	
2013	The Hong Kong Affair	Writer	

=== Theatre ===
Year	Title	Role	Notes
2004	Hans Christian Andersen: My Fairytale	Writer	
2016	Octoberfest The Musical	Writer	Los Angeles
2020	The Prince of Egypt	Writer	Fredericia Theatre, later West End
2019	Djævelens lærling (The Devil's Apprentice)	Writer	
2022	Snow White and Me	Writer	

== Awards and nominations ==
Year	Association	Category	Project	Result
1995	CableAce Award	Children's Programming	Mrs. Piggle-Wiggle	Nominated
1995	CableAce Award	Children's Series	Mrs. Piggle-Wiggle	Nominated
1998	Annie Award	Outstanding Writing for an Animated Feature	Mulan	Won
