= Ned Flanders =

Fictional character from The Simpsons franchise

- The Simpsons character
- Flanders waving
- First appearance: "Simpsons Roasting on an Open Fire" (1989)
- Created by: Matt Groening
- Designed by: Matt Groening
- Voiced by: Harry Shearer

In-universe information
- Full name: Nedward Flanders Jr.
- Gender: Male
- Occupation: Pharmaceutical company clerk (former, until he opened the Leftorium), owner of the Leftorium (former, until it closed), fourth grade teacher at Springfield Elementary School (former, he was fired)
- Family: Nedward Flanders, Sr. (father); Nediana Flanders (sister)
- Spouses: Maude Flanders (died) Ginger Flanders (separated) Edna Krabappel (died)
- Children: Rod Flanders; Todd Flanders
- Religion: Evangelical Christian
- Nationality: American
- Born: June 7, 1959^{S36E12}

Nedward "Ned" Flanders Jr., commonly referred to by his surname, is a recurring character in the animated television series The Simpsons, voiced by Harry Shearer and first appearing in the series premiere episode "Simpsons Roasting on an Open Fire." He is the good-natured, cheery next-door neighbor to the Simpson family and is generally perceived as annoying by Homer Simpson, though there are numerous instances where the two are portrayed as good friends. A scrupulous and devout Evangelical Christian, he is among the friendliest and most compassionate of Springfield's residents and is generally considered a pillar of the Springfield community.

He was one of the first characters outside the immediate Simpson family to appear on the show, and has since been central to several episodes, the first being season two's "Dead Putting Society". As the series progressed, Flanders's religious fanaticism increased immensely, prompting the coining of the term "Flanderization" to refer to the phenomenon of exaggerating certain traits of a fictional character to the point of redefining the character around them. His last name comes from Flanders Street in Portland, Oregon, the hometown of Simpsons creator Matt Groening.

== Characterization ==
=== Creation ===
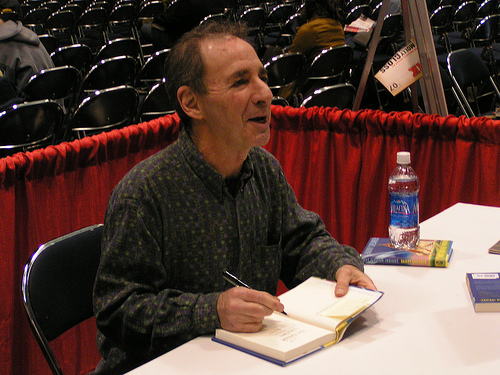
The writers found Harry Shearer's voice for Flanders so sweet that they decided to make the character a Christian.

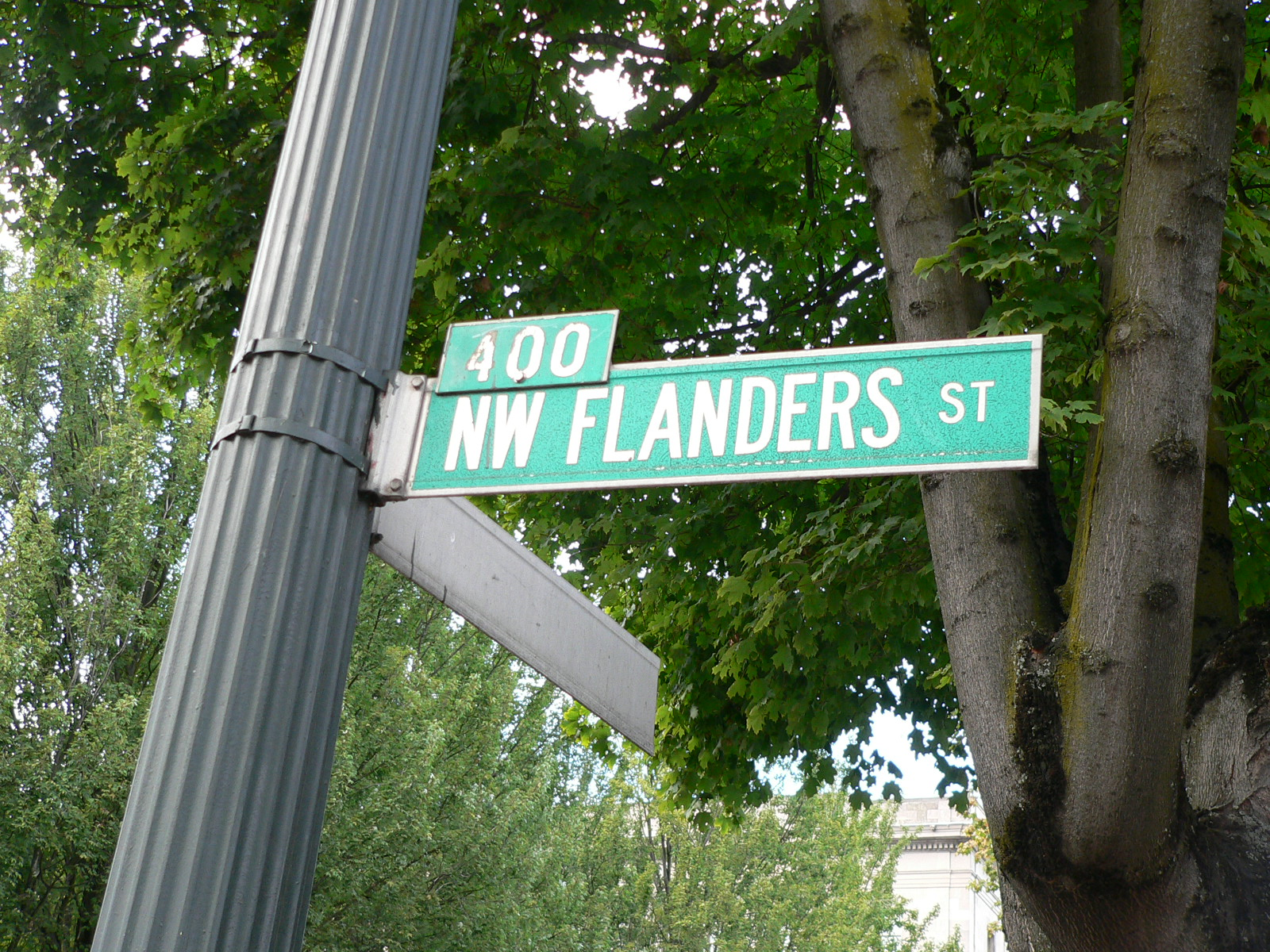
Series creator Matt Groening named the character after Flanders Street in his hometown of Portland, Oregon.

Ned Flanders, who was designed by Rich Moore, first appeared in the season one episode "Simpsons Roasting on an Open Fire". The episode was the series premiere, but not the first episode produced. The first episode in which Flanders and his family were prominent is season two's "Dead Putting Society", which also contained the first appearance of Maude and Rod Flanders. The character was named after Flanders Street in Portland, Oregon, the hometown of Simpsons creator Matt Groening. Groening described the inspiration for Flanders as "just a guy who was truly nice, that Homer had no justifiable reason to loathe, but then did". It was not until after the first few episodes that it was decided Flanders would be a faithful Christian. Mike Scully noted that Flanders is "everything Homer would love to be, although he'll never admit it". Flanders had been meant to be just a neighbor that Homer was jealous of, but Harry Shearer used "such a sweet voice" and Flanders was broadened to become a Christian and a sweet guy that someone would prefer to live next to over Homer. Flanders is known for his nonsensical jabbering, such as "Hi-diddly-ho, neighborino" as a greeting. His first use of the word "diddly" was in "The Call of the Simpsons".

=== Development ===
Ned Flanders' religion was not mentioned in his first few appearances and in the first few seasons he was only mildly religious and his primary role was to be so "cloyingly perfect as to annoy and shame the Simpsons", whereas Homer Simpson has always hated Ned Flanders and always tries to undermine him. There has been a consistent effort among the show's writers to make him not just a "goody good and an unsympathetic person". In the later seasons, Flanders has become more of a caricature of the Christian right, and his role as a "perfect neighbor" has been lessened. For example, in some recent episodes Flanders has appeared to show rather prejudiced attitudes towards women, non-whites, homosexuals and people of religions other than Christianity, including allusions towards antisemitism in the season 13 episodes 'Scuse Me While I Miss the Sky and A Star Is Born Again. Though he only ever showed homophobic signs in non-canon episodes, notably "Frinkenstein" where he says "I'm running to find a cure for homosexuality".

Ned's store, the Leftorium, first appeared in "When Flanders Failed". It was suggested by George Meyer, who had had a friend who had owned a left-handed specialty store that failed.

There have been at least two occasions where Ned was not voiced by Harry Shearer. In "Bart of Darkness", Flanders's high-pitched scream was performed by Tress MacNeille and in "Homer to the Max", Flanders comments about cartoons being easily able to change voice actors and on that occasion he was voiced by Karl Wiedergott.

=== The Adventures of Ned Flanders ===
The Adventures of Ned Flanders was a "series" of shorts starring Flanders, but only one episode, "Love that God", was produced. It appears at the end of the fourth season episode "The Front" because the episode was too short and the producers had already tried "every trick in the book" to lengthen it. Although the episode was scripted by Adam I. Lapidus, "Love That God" was written by Mike Reiss, Al Jean and Sam Simon. In the 34-second-long segment, which comes complete with its own theme song, Ned walks into Rod and Todd's room as they are praying and tells them it is time for church. He is upset when Todd replies that they are not going, until Todd reminds him it is Saturday, and Ned laughs at his mistake.

Most fans were confused by the short, but Bill Oakley and several other writers loved it so much that they wanted to do more. Later, Oakley and Josh Weinstein decided to produce an entire episode that was nothing but loosely associated shorts, which became the season seven episode "22 Short Films About Springfield". The Flanders/Lovejoy segment of that episode was written by David X. Cohen. "22 Short Films about Springfield" in turn inspired the Futurama episode "Three Hundred Big Boys".

== Role in The Simpsons ==
Ned is frequently portrayed as adhering closely to Christian teachings on charity, kindness, and compassion. He is shown participating in volunteer work, and places a strong emphasis on honesty. In one episode, he spends an entire day tracking down a Leftorium customer in order to return change that he had forgotten to give them.

In "Homer's Triple Bypass", he donates a kidney and a lung out of pure generosity to whomever needs them first. He also is a good neighbor to the Simpsons, regularly offering his assistance. Ned's dogged friendship inspires the loyalty of others; when his Leftorium shop appeared on the verge of bankruptcy shortly after it opened, Homer arranged a bailout with the help of many people in Springfield. Despite a meek outward appearance, Ned hides an exceptionally well-toned physique.

=== The Simpsons' good neighbor ===
In the early years of The Simpsons, Homer Simpson generally loathed Ned, because Ned's family, job, health and self-discipline are of higher quality than he could ever hope to attain himself. Homer is often shown "borrowing" (stealing) items from Flanders, such as a weather vane, a camcorder, a diploma, a toothbrush and an air conditioning unit. Even the Simpsons' couch came from "the curb outside Flanders' house". Homer has since come to have a love-hate relationship with Ned, sometimes being his best friend, partly due to Ned's selfless tolerance of him, and other times treating Ned with complete disregard. Homer seems to genuinely care for Ned, despite still expressing and often acting on feelings of loathing. Nowadays, Homer seems to regard Ned as more of his best friend. An early running joke was that Marge considers Flanders to be a perfect neighbor, and usually sides with him instead of her husband, which always enrages Homer. In "Left Behind," Homer succinctly states, "[Flanders] makes me feel so damn guilty!"

=== Religiosity ===
Flanders as the devil in "Treehouse of Horror IV", portrayed as such due to being "the one you least suspect"

Ned Flanders is genuinely well-meaning and good-natured, one of the few such people in Springfield. Firmly religious, sometimes even being portrayed as an overly friendly people person. He can be timid and something of a pushover. He is a Republican and a devout Evangelical Christian who strictly follows the Bible literally and is easily shocked when challenged on any point of dogma. This causes frequent calls to Reverend Lovejoy, even over minuscule things, to the point that Lovejoy has stopped caring and has even suggested that Flanders try a different religion. This was a running joke in the early seasons, but has been used less in the later episodes. In the eighth season, the episode "In Marge We Trust" would examine the relationship between Lovejoy and Flanders, and shows the history of their relationship and how Lovejoy became increasingly uninterested in Flanders' problems. Flanders is shown to have a room in his house filled with memorabilia of The Beatles. He claims that this is because they were "bigger than Jesus".

=== Family and job ===
Ned is a widower, having been married to the equally religious Maude. They had two children together, the sheltered and naïve Rod and Todd Flanders. In the eleventh season episode "Alone Again, Natura-Diddily", Maude died an untimely death in a freak accident involving a T-shirt cannon, leaving Flanders alone and grieving. While still married to Maude, Ned married Ginger, while on a drunken bender in Las Vegas. Ginger came to live with Ned and his sons for a brief period following Maude's death in a later episode, but she quickly grew tired of the Flanders' sickly-sweet personalities and fled. Despite his outward nerdishness, Flanders has also been connected romantically with a beautiful Christian-rock singer, Rachel Jordan, movie star Sara Sloane and eventually marrying local teacher Edna Krabappel until she died as well.

A young Ned seen with his beatnik parents

Ned got his diploma from Oral Roberts University in an unspecified field and worked as a salesman in the pharmaceuticals industry for the bulk of his adult life. Having saved much of his earnings, Flanders decided to quit his job and invested his family's life savings into a store in the Springfield mall called the Leftorium specializing in products for left-handed people. In the fifth season episode, "Sweet Seymour Skinner's Baadasssss Song", Superintendent Chalmers fires Ned Flanders, who has become principal after Skinner being sacked, only because he freely expresses his religious views in the school. However in the Season 29 episode "Left Behind", owing to declining sales, the Leftorium had been downsized from an outlet to a kiosk, eventually going out of business alongside the Sears outlet at Springfield Mall. Left unemployed, Flanders returned to Springfield Elementary School, finding a new job as Bart Simpson's new teacher and substituting the void left by his deceased second wife Edna Krabappel, as well as honoring her life dream. Flanders remained Bart's teacher until the Season 33 episode "My Octopus and a Teacher", at which point the role was assumed by Rayshelle Peyton.

In the episode "Hurricane Neddy" a flashback to 30 years earlier shows Ned as a young child, despite the fact that in the episode "Viva Ned Flanders" he says to the church congregation that he was actually 60 years old, attributing his youthful appearance to his conformity to the "three Cs"—"clean living, chewing thoroughly, and a daily dose of vitamin church". Ned grew up in New York City and was the son of "freaky beatniks" who did not discipline Ned (as they did not think it was right) and let him run wild. Eventually they took him to Dr. Foster, a psychiatrist, who put the young Ned through the University of Minnesota Spankalogical Protocol, which involved eight months of continuous spanking. The treatment worked so well that it rendered Flanders unable to express any anger at all and resulted in his trademark nonsensical jabbering at moments when he was particularly close to losing his temper, causing Ned to unknowingly repress his anger.

== Reception ==
Although in more recent seasons Flanders has become a caricature of the Christian right, he is still a favorite of many Christian viewers. Rowan Williams, a former archbishop of Canterbury, is a confessed Simpsons fan, and is reportedly a Flanders fan. Ned's "unbearable piousness" has been described as The Simpsons' sharpest critique of organized religion: "The show's implicit argument seems to be that humorless obsessives like Ned have hijacked religious institutions, removing them from the center of society to a place where only those who know their brides of Beth Chedruharazzeb from their wells of Zohassadar can seek solace." Steve Goddard of the website Ship of Fools said, "Ned is an innocent abroad in a world of cynicism and compromise. We love him because we know what it's like to be classed as a nerd – and to come out smiling at the end of it." The February 5, 2001 edition of Billy Graham's Christianity Today, titled Saint Flanders, featured Flanders, along with Homer and Marge, on the cover and described him as "the most visible evangelical to many Americans."

=== Cultural impact ===
Flanders has been described as "The United States' most well-known evangelical". According to Christianity Today in 2001, "on American college and high school campuses, the name most associated with the word Christian—other than Jesus—is not the Pope or Mother Teresa or even Billy Graham. Instead, it's a goofy-looking guy named Ned Flanders on the animated sitcom known as The Simpsons. The mustache, thick glasses, green sweater, and irrepressibly cheerful demeanor of Ned Flanders, Homer Simpson's next-door neighbor, have made him an indelible figure, the evangelical known most intimately to nonevangelicals." In 2001 and 2002, the Greenbelt Festival, a British Christian music and arts fest, held a special "Ned Flanders Night". The 2001 event featured a look-alike contest, as well as the tribute band "Ned Zeppelin". It was held in a 500-seat venue that was filled to capacity, and an extra 1500 people were turned away at the door. A second event was held in 2002, with Ned Zeppelin reappearing.

In 2017, after president Donald Trump insulted television host Mika Brzezinski on Twitter, Orrin Hatch responded and said, "Every once in a while you get a dipsy-doodle," as Ned Flanders' term. In 2019, Trevor Noah on The Daily Show compared Mike Pence to Flanders when discussing the Ukraine scandal. Aaron Stonehouse, Western Australia's first Liberal Democrat MP, made a comparison between the McGowan government and Ned Flanders' wife, Maude Flanders, a devout Christian who died after being knocked off a grandstand in a T-shirt cannon accident on The Simpsons. In 2022, Relevant claimed that Flanders was "unapologetically not cool" as a Christian, but overall "decent".

Professional ice hockey goaltender Peter Budaj was known for having Ned Flanders painted on his mask during his hockey career. Another tribute band, Okilly Dokilly, plays heavy metal music. In 2018, MadeinTYO released a rap song about Flanders. The Ned Flanders Crossing, a pedestrian and bicycle bridge over Interstate 405 in Portland, Oregon, was named for the character in 2021. It connects two sections of Northwest Flanders Street, for whom the character is named.

Flanders makes an appearance in the video game Fortnite x Simpsons mini season that was released in November 2025. He appears as a skin for players to purchase.

=== Flanderization ===
Flanders' significant evolution of his Christian fanaticism has led to the term dubbed "Flanderization", which refers to the increasingly exaggerated characterization of any character throughout a TV or a film series. The specific case of Flanders attracts special attention. Debate exists over whether Flanders is a consistently flanderized character or whether he later returned to a more complex, dynamic portrayal. The appropriateness of the term "flanderization" has also been disputed, as many characters in The Simpsons have undergone the caricaturizing process, and Flanders himself may not be the most extreme case. Flanders' shifting portrayal has also been controversial as representative of a shift in media portrayals of religious people. As both the primary representative of Christianity on The Simpsons and as one of the most significant Christian fictional characters in the real world, the simplification of Flanders as a character has been the subject of criticism, study, and reinterpretation.

=== Merchandise ===
Flanders has been included in The Simpsons merchandise. In 2008, the Flanders' Book of Faith, part of the Simpsons Library of Wisdom, was released by HarperCollins. The book takes a look at Flanders' life and his ever enduring faith. In 2021, Flanders got a sneaker line from Adidas.
