= Ken LaZebnik =

American writer (born 1954)

- Born: November 11, 1954 (age 71); Levittown, Pennsylvania
- Education: Macalester College
- Occupations: Writer - Books, T.V., Film, Stage
- Relatives: Rob LaZebnik (brother); Philip LaZebnik (brother)
- Website: www.kenlazebnik.com

Ken LaZebnik (born November 11, 1954) is an American writer, best known for his work in television, film, and theatre. His work has appeared in films such as A Prairie Home Companion and in television shows Touched by an Angel and Star Trek: Enterprise. LaZebnik's screenplay On the Spectrum earned him a Steinberg Award from the American Theatre Critics Association.

LaZebnik is the founder and director of the Master of Fine Arts in TV and Screenwriting program at Stephens College, a low residency program based in Hollywood. He is also the author of the 2014 book Hollywood Digs: An Archeology of Shadows, a collection of essays about personal encounters with Hollywood history.

== Career ==
=== Television and film ===
LaZebnik has an extensive career writing for film and television. For eight years he wrote for Touched By An Angel, an American supernatural drama series distributed by CBS. He is also credited with writing three specials for the PBS In Concert at the White House series. Additional television credits include being a contributing writer for Army Wives, Providence, Star Trek: Enterprise, and the Hallmark Channel series When Calls the Heart.

LaZebnik was the writer for Thomas Kinkade's Christmas Cottage a Lionsgate film released in 2008 which starred Peter O'Toole and Marcia Gay Harden. He also has a shared story credit with Garrison Keillor on the film A Prairie Home Companion, directed by Robert Altman.

=== Theater ===
LaZebnik's work also include eleven plays produced throughout the United States. He has written two plays on the subject of baseball, both of which were commissioned by the Mixed Blood Theatre Company and directed by its artistic director Jack Reuler. The first play, Calvinisms, was a one-man show about former Minnesota Twins owner Calvin Griffith. The second, League of Nations, is a fictional story set in a bullpen in the midst of a multi-cultural divide.

LaZebnik has written three plays dealing with autism which have had runs at the Mixed Blood Theatre Company. His play On the Spectrum premiered at the theatre and was awarded a Steinberg Citation from the American Theatre Critics Association. It later had a successful run in Los Angeles at the Fountain Theatre. Theory of The Mind was commissioned for young audiences by the Cincinnati Playhouse in the Park and has also been produced in Minnesota, Hawaii and Michigan. Vestibular Sense was LaZebnik's first play written with a theme and characters centered around autism.

LaZebnik's most recent work, Rachel Calof, was chosen to be performed at the 2015 United Solo Festival in New York City. Rachel Calof is a one-woman show adapted from the memoir of a Jewish homesteader in North Dakota and stars Kate Fuglei.

Other works include African Jazz, The Garden of Joy, Harlem Renaissance Revue, Sink Eating and Black Magic which he co-wrote with Jack Reuler and Bob DeFlores.

=== Books and journals ===
In 1981, LaZebnik founded The Minneapolis Review of Baseball, a quarterly journal of writing on baseball. It featured baseball fiction, poetry, history, and editorials on the game. Authors who wrote for the magazine included Garrison Keillor, Sen. Eugene McCarthy, Steve Lehman, and Bart Schneider. An anthology was published in 1989: The Best of the Minneapolis Review of Baseball. LaZebnik and Steve Lehman also collaborated on a children's baseball ABC book, A Is For At Bat. LaZebnik has written about baseball for The New York Times, Manhattan, inc., and City Pages.

LaZebnik's latest book is Hollywood Digs: An Archaeology of Shadows, published by Kelly's Cove Press in 2014. It is a collection of essays about personal encounters with shards of Hollywood history, including profiles of stuntman/actor Jock Mahoney, the real-life "Gidget," writer Melville Shavelson, and essays on pieces of Hollywood history, such as F. Scott Fitzgerald's tenancy on the San Fernando Valley estate of film butler Edward Everett Horton.

=== Academia ===
LaZebnik is the founder and director of the Master of Fine Arts in TV and Screenwriting program at Stephens College, a low residency program based in Hollywood. The program is geared more towards women, but is open to both men and women. Students are paired with a mentor in screenwriting for both television and film, with a goal of boosting the number of women who work in the film industry. The program sends students to Jim Henson Company Studios for 10 days each semester. Partial funding for the program came from Alex Trebek, a friend of LaZebnik, who endowed a chair in the program for screenwriting. Prior to Stephens, LaZebnik worked as an adjunct professor at Pepperdine University since 2010. LaZebnik is currently the Director of the TV Writers Studio (TVWS) at Long Island University in Brooklyn, New York.

== Published works ==
Select film and television credits

Year	Movie/TV Show	Role	Notes
2014	When Calls the Heart	Writer	Two episodes in 2014 ("The Dance" & "A Telling Silence")
2014	Pencils Down! The 100 Days of the Writers Guild Strike	Self	Documentary about the 2007–08 Writers Guild of America strike.
2012	Army Wives	Writer	Episode Casualties
2008	Christmas Cottage	Writer	Also known as Thomas Kinkade's The Christmas Cottage
2006	A Prairie Home Companion	Writer	2006 film directed by Robert Altman
2004-2005	Star Trek: Enterprise	Writer & Producer	Writer of episodes Daedalus & Borderland. Supervising producer on 11 episodes.
1994-2003	Touched by an Angel	Writer & Producer	Writer of multiple episodes. Consulting producer on numerous episodes from 1996 to 2003.
2001	In Performance at the White House	Writer	Writer
2000-2001	Providence	Writer & Producer	Wrote episodes The Gun & The Good Doctor. Supervising producer of 10 episodes.
1994	The Commish	Writer	Episode Born in the USA
1994	The Jackie Thomas Show	Writer	Episode The Player

Select theatre credits

Year	Title	Role	Notes
2013	The Garden of Joy	Writer	A play with music about the Harlem Renaissance
2011	Rachel Calof	Writer	One-woman show adapted from the memoir of a Jewish homesteader in North Dakota.
2011	On The Spectrum	Writer	Premiered at the Mixed Blood Theatre and earned a Steinberg Citation
2009	Theory of the Mind	Writer	Commissioned for young audiences by the Cincinnati Playhouse in the Park.
2006	Vestibular Sense	Writer	First play written by LaZebnik with autism theme. Premiered at Mixed Blood Theatre.
2002	League of Nations	Writer	Writer
2000	Sink Eating	Writer	Comedy about Summer Stock. Premiered at the Matrix Theatre in Los Angeles.
1988	Calvinisms	Writer	One-man show about former Minnesota Twins owner Calvin Griffith
1983	Harlem Renaissance Revue	Writer	Writer
1982	Black Magic	Writer	
1979	African Jazz	Writer	

Bibliography

Year	Title	Publisher	ISBN	Notes
2014	Hollywood Digs: An Archaeology of Shadows	Kelly's Cove Press	9780989166447	Collection of essays about personal encounters with shards of Hollywood history.
1989	"A" Is for at Bat: A Baseball Primer	Culpepper Press	9780929636009	Co-author with Steve Lehman, illustrated by Andy Nelson
