= Russian University of Medicine =

Dental school in Moscow

- Российский университет медицины
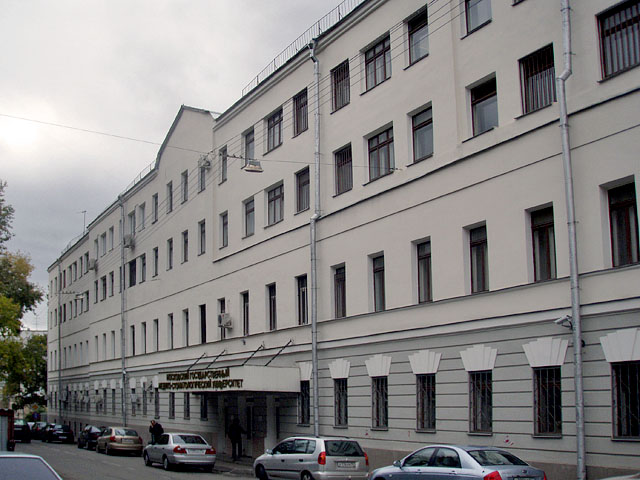
- Former names: Moscow State University of Medicine and Dentistry
- Motto: Hinc sanitas
- Established: April 2, 1922
- Location: Moscow, Russia; 55°46′35″N 37°36′57″E
- Website: msmsu.ru

The Russian University of Medicine, formerly known as Moscow State University of Medicine and Dentistry, is a public medical university in Moscow, Russia. Its history dates back to the emergence of dental schools in Russia in the 19th century.

== History ==
=== Establishment ===
The history of Moscow State University of Medicine and Dentistry (MSUMD) dates back to the 19th century, when the first dental surgery school was opened in 1892 by I.M. Kovarsky. Later, when the Soviets came to power in Russia, it was turned into the House of Soviet Dentistry.

=== Early Soviet years ===
In February 1920, when the Kovarsky dental school went under the jurisdiction of Narkomzdrav (the People's Commissariat of Health), the Kovarsky school was transformed into a dental research center by the decision of Narkomzdrav's dental health division in order to bring together all dental care units that existed at the time in different parts of Moscow — a demonstration dispensary, a chemical laboratory, and the Kovarsky institution itself. The center was named the House of Soviet Dentistry (HSD) and among its main purposes were the retraining of former dentists into oral care consultants, and the preparation of secondary dental personnel, such as dental mechanics, filling and prosthetic specialists, and chair side assistants.

First renamed in December, 1920, the HSD's official opening took place two years later in April 1922, when again it was given a different name. This time it was the State Institute of Dentistry (SID), which was to be headed by M.В. Yankovsky, who directed his staff in a study of Dentistry and Odontology before anything else; the two major problems to be solved were tooth decay and periodontal disease. Another new name, that of the State Institute of Stomatology and Odontology (SISO) was given in April 1927 by decree of the Sovnarkom (the Soviet government). In 1932, the SISO was renamed yet again, this time to the State Research Institute of Stomatology and Odontology (SRISO) and from then on it was concerned mostly with scientific research problems.

=== Years as Moscow Stomatological Institute ===
The Moscow Stomatological Institute (MSI) as a higher dental school was established under the Narkomzdrav's order dated June 9, 1935, as a subdivision within the SRISO's framework. Both institutions were housed in one building, sharing administration, finances and facilities. In line with the resolution of the RSFSR Narkomzdrav of September 1, 1939, the SRISO and MSI were united to become the Moscow State Stomatology Institute (MSSI) with associate professor D. S. Dyshlis as Director. That year witnessed the first batch of 79 graduates trained by the new institution. In the first days of the war, the MSSI's 1941 graduates were called up to serve in the Red Army or Navy. On October 1, 1943, the Moscow State Stomatology Institute opened its doors to students again and about a year later, in February, 1944, A.I. Yevdokimov was appointed its director.

=== After World War II and Khrushchev Thaw ===
After the war on October 15, 1949, by decision of the USSR Council of Ministers, former dental schools were reorganized into general medicine and dentistry institutes with a 5-year course of studies. The Moscow State Stomatology Institute was again renamed to become the Moscow Medical Stomatology Institute (MMSI). From 1964 to 1965, the institute was headed by Prof A.I. Doimkov. From 1965 to 1968, the post of Rector of the MMSI was held by Professor S.I. Babichev, head of the institute's Surgical Disease department.

=== Brezhnev years and Perestroika ===
During the period of time from 1968 to 1974, when the institute was headed by prof. A.Z. Belousov, the proposal of setting up a general medicine faculty was realized in 1968. The emergence of the new faculty that was to cater for the need in medical professionals by the city of Moscow and its surroundings called for employment of more teaching staff for a number of the existing departments (those of Foreign Languages, Anatomy, Physiology, Biology, Histology, Physics and General Chemistry, Microbiology and Pharmacology and others) as well as for putting up new courses and departments. These were launched a year later, staffed with specialists and office workers. That same year, the MMSI opened an advanced training faculty for medical professionals with departments for dental and general practitioners, which was followed by opening in 1975 of a faculty for advanced training of teaching staff. From 1974 to 1982, Professor К.M. Lakin, corresponding member of the USSR Academy of Medical Sciences, headed the institution.

=== In modern Russia ===
The decades that followed (1982 to 2002) saw Professor Ye.I. Sokolov as the Rector. Towards the end of the decade, by the orders of the Ministries for General and Vocational Education and that for Public Health of the Russian Federation, dated June 10, 1999, granted the MMSI a university status with a full name from then on of Moscow State University of Medicine and Dentistry (MSUMD) under the Russian Ministry of Public Health. Since 2024 renamed to the Russian University of Medicine (RUM).

== Rector of the University ==
During the five years after Professor Ye.I. Sokolov's resignation in 2002, the university was led by Professor N.D. Yushchuk. On May 15, 2007, Professor O.O. Yanushevich was elected rector in a ballot by a university staff meeting that was unanimous in voting for the former rector, N.D. Yuschuk, as the University President.

== Notable faculty ==
- Yakov Kahn, MD - professor of urology
- Anatoly Sharpenak (1895 - 1969) - scholar and biochemist, professor. In 1939 he founded the Department of Biological Chemistry, and was the head of the department until 1969. He was then replaced by the founder of one of the theories of the origin and development of dental caries, known as Sharpenak's theory.
- Leonid Lazebnik
