= Treehouse of Horror II =

- The Simpsons episode
- Newspaper advertisement
- Episode no.: Season 3 Episode 7
- Directed by: Jim Reardon
- Written by: Al Jean; Mike Reiss; Jeff Martin; George Meyer; Sam Simon; John Swartzwelder
- Production code: 8F02
- Original air date: October 31, 1991

Guest appearance
- Marcia Wallace as Edna Krabappel

Episode features
- Commentary: Matt Groening; Al Jean; Mike Reiss; Dan Castellaneta; Jeff Martin; Jim Reardon

Episode chronology
← Previous "Like Father, Like Clown"	Next → "Lisa's Pony"
- The Simpsons season 3

"Treehouse of Horror II" (Note: titled on screen as "The Simpsons Halloween Special II") is the seventh episode of the third season of the American animated television series The Simpsons. It first aired on Fox in the United States on Halloween, 1991. It is the second annual Treehouse of Horror episode, consisting of three self-contained segments, told as dreams of Lisa, Bart and Homer and is the only Treehouse of Horror episode to date where each segment name is not stated inside the episode. In the first segment, which was inspired by W. W. Jacobs's short story "The Monkey's Paw" and The Twilight Zone episode "A Small Talent for War", Homer buys a Monkey's Paw that has the power to grant wishes, although all the wishes backfire. In the second part, which parodies the Twilight Zone episode "It's a Good Life", Bart is omnipotent, and turns Homer into a jack-in-the-box, resulting in the two spending more time together. In the final segment, Mr. Burns attempts to use Homer's brain to power a giant robotic laborer.

The episode was written by Al Jean, Mike Reiss, Jeff Martin, George Meyer, Sam Simon and John Swartzwelder while Jim Reardon was the director. The episode is presented in a similar format to the previous season's "Treehouse of Horror" and contains several similarities to the previous episode, such as Marge's opening warning, the tombstones in the opening credits and the appearance of the alien characters Kang and Kodos. "Treehouse of Horror II" was the first episode that employed the "scary names" idea, in which many of the credits have unusual names. The episode contains numerous parodies and references to horror and science fiction works, including The Twilight Zone, Frankenstein, Bride of Frankenstein, The Thing with Two Heads and Invasion of the Body Snatchers.

In its original airing on Fox, the episode had a 12.1 Nielsen rating and finished the week ranked 39th. The episode received positive reviews, and in 2006, IGN listed the third story as the eighth best Treehouse of Horror segment. The episode was nominated for two Primetime Emmy Awards: Outstanding Individual Achievement in Sound Mixing for a Comedy Series or a Special and Alf Clausen for Outstanding Music Composition for a Series.

== Plot ==
After eating too much Halloween candy, Homer, Lisa and Bart have nightmares.

=== Lisa's Nightmare ===
The family takes a trip to Morocco. Homer buys a cursed monkey's paw that will grant its owner four wishes. The shop vendor warns Homer that the paw can cause "grave misfortune," but Homer ignores him. Upon returning home, he argues with Bart and Lisa over who gets to use the paw, while Marge pleads with them to heed the vendor's warning and not use it at all. Despite this, Maggie is granted the first wish: a new pacifier. Bart wishes for the Simpsons to be rich and famous, but the public soon tires of the family's antics and ubiquity. Horrified by the wasteful wishes, Lisa wishes for world peace, but aliens Kang and Kodos enslave the defenseless Earth. Determined to make a harmless wish, Homer demands a turkey sandwich, but the turkey is dry. With all the wishes used, he gives the paw to his neighbor Ned, and the paw resets. Ned wishes for the aliens to leave, which they do after Moe chases them away, using a wooden plank with a nail in it as a weapon. Ned then turns his house into a castle, much to Homer's frustration.

=== Bart's Nightmare ===
Springfield lives in fear of Bart's omnipotent powers, including the ability to read minds, magically move objects, and turn living things into grotesque forms. When Homer refuses to turn off a football game so Bart can watch The Krusty the Clown Show, Bart transports him to the football stadium in place of the ball for a field goal kick. As Homer creeps into the house trying to surprise him with a blow to the head, Bart transforms Homer into a jack-in-the-box. After Dr. Marvin Monroe says Bart is desperate for attention from his father, Homer spends quality time with his son. Bart restores Homer's human form, and they share a warm moment, which wakes Bart up screaming.

=== Homer's Nightmare ===
Homer becomes a grave digger after Mr. Burns fires him for incompetence. While building a giant robotic laborer to replace human workers, Burns searches a graveyard for a human brain to implant in the robot. After mistaking Homer, asleep in an open grave, for a corpse, he removes his brain and places it in the robot. Since Robo-Homer is just as incompetent as the old Homer, Burns declares the experiment a failure. After restoring the brain to Homer's body, Burns kicks the robot, toppling it and crushing him. Homer wakes from the nightmare to find Burns' head grafted on his shoulder. Homer tries to reassure himself that he is only dreaming, but Burns' head insists otherwise.

== Production ==
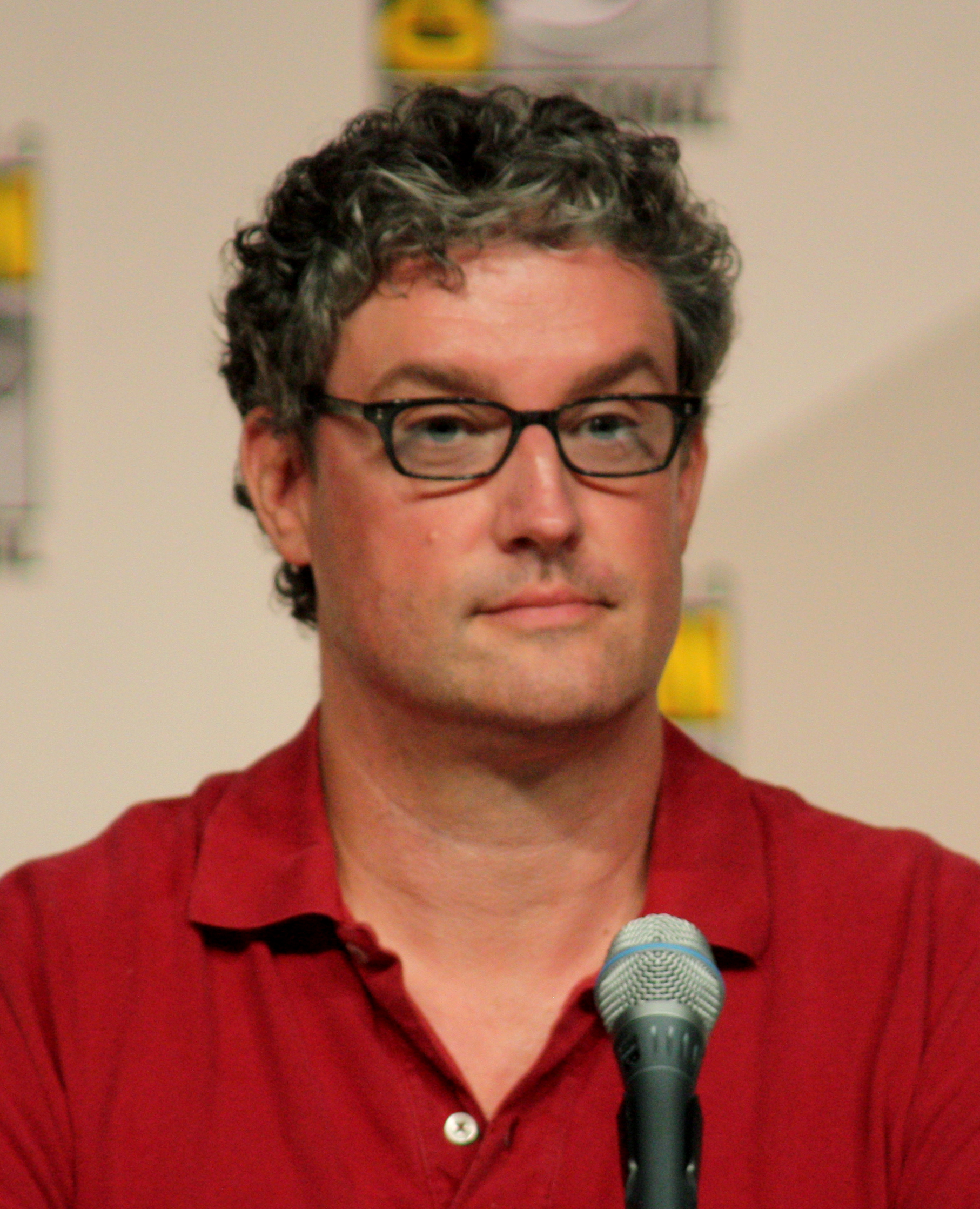
The episode was executive-produced and co-written by Al Jean, who also pitched the idea of having "scary names" in the opening credits.

"Treehouse of Horror II", the second edition of the Treehouse of Horror series of episodes, was written by Al Jean, Mike Reiss, Jeff Martin, George Meyer, Sam Simon and John Swartzwelder. Jim Reardon was the director. The episode is presented in a similar format to the previous season's "Treehouse of Horror" and contains several similarities to the previous episode, such as Marge's opening warning, the tombstones in the opening credits and the appearance of the alien characters Kang and Kodos. "Treehouse of Horror II" was the first episode that employed the "scary names" idea, in which many of the names in the opening and closing credits have unusual nicknames. The idea came from Al Jean, who was inspired by old issues of EC Comics. Although the names quickly became more silly than scary, there has been a wide variety of special credits. For example, the director's name is given as Jim "Rondo" Reardon, a reference to his idol, Rondo Hatton. The "scary names" became such a burden to write that they were cut for the thirteenth season episode "Treehouse of Horror XII" and the fourteenth season episode "Treehouse of Horror XIII", but after hearing complaints from the fans, Jean decided to bring them back. The alien characters Kang and Kodos had been introduced in the previous year. There was a debate about whether to include them in all Halloween specials after the episode; eventually, the writers agreed to make it a tradition.

During the beginning of Lisa's dream, Hank Azaria faked some Arabic. Usually, the writers get inspiration for the Halloween specials from old horror stories, but recently, the writers tried to conceive of their own stories instead of creating more parodies. Also, when the Moroccan salesman tries to warn Homer, saying "You'll be sorry", the animators forgot to move his lips. They realized their error only after the broadcast. While writing the segment, writer Sam Simon wanted the fingers to go down in such an order so they would eventually have the middle finger sticking up. Once the animation would have been complete, however, they could not have gone through; Fox would have refused to air the episode. They had considered the alternative of deliberately blurring the middle finger themselves, but decided that Fox would have also refused. For this episode, there were a lot of loop lines; for instance, the ending to Lisa's dream was added to the last second. As a result of the loop, they still retained Ned Flanders' old house next to his newly created castle. In order to make the episode fill the time needed, the animators often extended the laughing time for Kang and Kodos.

The second segment is based on The Twilight Zone television series episode "It's a Good Life". That episode had also inspired the third segment of Twilight Zone: The Movie, which starred Nancy Cartwright in her debut feature film role. The segment parodies the narration of The Twilight Zone, and the producers were pleased with Harry Shearer's portrayal of Rod Serling (Shearer had previously impersonated Serling while he was a cast member on Saturday Night Live). In addition, though it took a long time, the design of the monster version of Snowball II by Dale Hendrickson was greatly enjoyed by the producers, who thought it looked "just hideous, just right". Bart's prank call to Moe was thought of by John Swartzwelder, one of the writers; however, Hank Azaria detested the line. According to George Meyer, the animation for when Bart sits up screaming was extremely tough, especially to make the mouthlines natural.

In the third segment, Mr. Burns and Waylon Smithers go down to the lab during Homer's nightmare. The animators decided to make the animation a bit more impressive, and decided to do the concave and convex images of Burns and Smithers. Even though it was tough and took up more time, the producers felt it was a necessary tour-de-force. Originally, Homer's robotic voice was done post-animation in order to avoid stress on the voice actor. Then-head writer Jay Kogen, who created the Davy Crockett joke, thought it was so funny he actually mimicked the actions of Mr. Burns putting on Homer's brain in the writing room; the producers thought it was hilarious, so they decided to add it into the episode.

== Cultural references ==
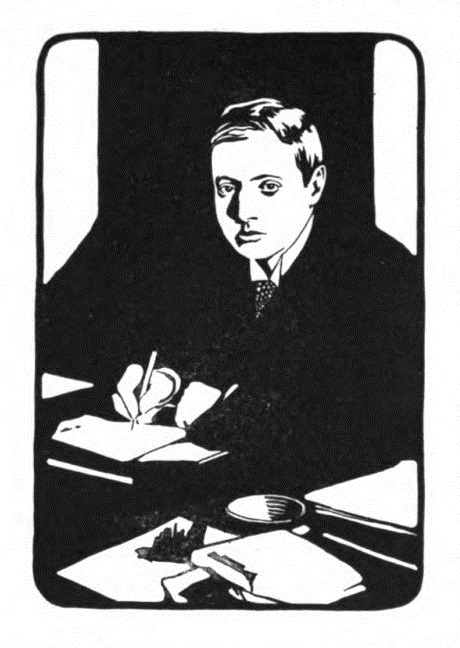
Lisa's dream is a parody of W. W. Jacobs' "The Monkey's Paw"

In the opening sequence of the episode, the Peanuts gang scurry by as trick-or-treaters, à la It's the Great Pumpkin, Charlie Brown. Marge's hair in the opening segment recalls Elsa Lanchester's in Bride of Frankenstein.

The plot of Lisa's nightmare is a parody of W. W. Jacobs's short story "The Monkey's Paw", and The New Twilight Zone episode "A Small Talent for War". Near the beginning of the segment, Moroccan soldiers stop and search the Simpsons, finding souvenirs taped to Homer's body which he was attempting to smuggle out of the country. This is a reference to the opening drug-smuggling scene of the film Midnight Express. A billboard advertisement with Bart saying "Get a Mammogram, Man!" can be seen. This was a reference to Bart's popular slogan "Don't have a cow, man!"

The plot of Bart's nightmare is a parody of The Twilight Zone episode "It's a Good Life", which was remade as part of Twilight Zone: The Movie, which featured Nancy Cartwright in the role of Ethel. Jasper's transformation into a dog is a reference to the 1978 remake of Invasion of the Body Snatchers. The scene in which Homer goes out with Bart to spend time with the boy, as well as the accompanying music, parody an old anti-smoking public service announcement, while the church layout was taken from a Norman Rockwell painting.

Much of Homer's nightmare is based on the film Frankenstein, and the end references The Thing with Two Heads. While Mr. Burns scoops out Homer's brain, he hums the tune of "If I Only Had a Brain", sung by the Scarecrow in The Wizard of Oz. Burns also calls his failed robot a "clinking, clattering cacophony of caliginous cogs and camshafts", similar to the Wizard's line to the Tin Man: "You clinking, clanking, clattering collection of caliginous junk!" Burns jokingly puts the detached brain on his head, with a piece of spinal cord dangling down the back of his neck, and says "Look at me! I'm Davy Crockett". This references the popular image of Crockett wearing a hat made of raccoon fur, with a raccoon tail attached to the back. The segment features a television playing The Tonight Show Starring Johnny Carson.

== Reception ==
In its original airing on Fox, the episode had a 12.1 Nielsen rating and was viewed in approximately 11.14 million homes. It finished the week ranked 39th. It was the highest rated show on Fox the week it aired, tied with In Living Color.

The authors of the book I Can't Believe It's a Bigger and Better Updated Unofficial Simpsons Guide, Gary Russell and Gareth Roberts, praised the episode as "A marked improvement on the first, uneven Hallowe'en special. All three tales succeed, with Bart's nightmare of gaining awesome powers being perhaps the most successful". Bill Gibron of DVD Verdict lauded the episode for having "wonderfully wild moments", especially "the parody of The Twilight Zone's 'It's a Good Life,' with Bart in the place of Billy Mumy's omnipresent monster". He gave the episode a score of 90 out of 100 a possible score. DVD Movie Guide's Colin Jacobson critiqued the episode as "not so hot their first couple of years", though he admitted that "the 1991 incarnation does top the original from 1990". However, he thought that "None of the three stories stands out as particularly excellent, though the monkey's paw one probably works the best. Chalk up this episode as a decent Halloween set." He thought the best quote was "Damn it Smithers, this isn't rocket science. It's brain surgery!"

In 2006, IGN published a list of the top ten Treehouse of Horror segments, and they placed the third segment at number eight. They wrote, "'Treehouse of Horror II' contained three quality segments, but [the third] was easily the best. Featuring a story reminiscent to Frankenstein, this episode made us laugh from beginning to end with Homer's crazy antics. [...] The humor that is derived from the multiple movie and literary parodies was enough to leave a last impression on us as an audience — and who doesn't like a robot whose primary function is to find donuts?" Writing for the Star Tribune, Neal Justin rated the episode as the one of his ten favorite episodes, writing, "The annual Halloween specials glow because all the rules are thrown out, never with more ingenuity than in this second installment." The episode's reference to Midnight Express was named the 18th greatest film reference in the history of the show by Total Film's Nathan Ditum.

The episode was nominated for two Primetime Emmy Awards: Outstanding Individual Achievement in Sound Mixing for a Comedy Series or a Special and Alf Clausen for Outstanding Music Composition for a Series.

After watching a rerun of the episode, Curry Barker was inspired by Lisa's monkey paw nightmare to incorporate a wish element into his 2025 film Obsession.
