= Treehouse of Horror =

Series of Halloween-themed episodes of The Simpsons

- Cover of a DVD collection of Treehouse of Horror episodes
- Genre: Comedy horror
- Inspired by: EC Comics
- No. of episodes: (list of episodes)

Original release
- Network: Fox Network
- Release: 1990

Related
- The Simpsons

Treehouse of Horror is a series of annual Halloween-themed anthology episodes of the American animated sitcom The Simpsons. Also known as The Simpsons Halloween Specials, each episode typically consists of three separate, self-contained segments. (Note: The 2021 installment "Treehouse of Horror XXXII" expanded to five segments.) Each segment involves the Simpson family in some comical horror, science fiction, or supernatural setting; plot elements operate beyond the show's normal continuity, with segments exaggeratedly more morbid and violent than a typical Simpsons episode. With 36 episodes as of 2025, each Treehouse of Horror episode is numbered in Roman numerals, one less than the respective season it is in; the tradition began with the second season.

The eponymous first installment "Treehouse of Horror" aired on October 25, 1990, during the second season, broadly inspired by EC Comics horror tales. In addition to parodies of horror, science fiction, and fantasy films, episodes include the recurring alien characters Kang and Kodos, unique opening sequences, and 'scary' pseudonyms in the credits. Treehouse of Horror episodes have earned high ratings and broad popularity, spawning a steady stream of merchandise, including a comic book series that ran from 1995 to 2017.

== Segments ==
Treehouse of Horror episodes typically consist of four parts: an opening and Halloween-themed version of the credits, followed by three segments. These segments usually have a horror, science fiction or fantasy theme and quite often are parodies of films, novels, plays, television shows, Twilight Zone episodes, or old issues of EC Comics. Although they are sometimes connected by "wraparounds", the three segments rarely have any kind of continuing connection within the episode. Some have recurring elements, such as "Treehouse of Horror V", in which Groundskeeper Willie is killed by an axe in all three segments. The episodes are considered to be non-canon, which means they take place outside the normal continuity of the show.

The number of episodes of Treehouse of Horrors is one less than the number of seasons of the show: there are no such specials in season 1, two in season 34 (although the first, "Not It", is not numbered) and one in each other season. From "Treehouse of Horror" to "Treehouse of Horror XIII" and resuming with "Treehouse of Horror XXXIII", all three segments were written by different writers. In some cases there was a fourth writer who wrote the opening and wraparound segments. For the original "Treehouse of Horror", there were three different directors for the episode. From season 15's "Treehouse of Horror XIV" to season 33's "Treehouse of Horror XXXII", however, only one writer was credited with writing each Treehouse of Horror episode. "Treehouse of Horror XXXII" featured five segments. One of the season 34 Treehouse of Horror specials, "Not It", is distinguished by its uncharacteristic title and one full-length segment (divided in the two parts).

On occasion, the episodes will be used to showcase special animation, such as the "Treehouse of Horror VI" segment "Homer^{3}", in which a computer-animated Homer is shown in a non-animated setting. At the time (1995), it was unusual for a television show to use such animation. The segment was executive producer Bill Oakley's idea and included live-action directed by David Mirkin. "Treehouse of Horror XX" included the segment "There's No Business Like Moe Business", which was the first to be musically themed.

== Traditions ==
=== Opening sequence ===
Three of the tombstones from the opening segment of "Treehouse of Horror"

The first, second, and fifth Treehouse of Horror episodes open with Marge standing on a stage and warning parents about the content of the episode, advising them to put their children to bed. The warning in the first episode was put in as a sincere effort to warn young viewers, as the producers felt it was somewhat scary. The entire segment was a parody of Edward Van Sloan's pre-credits warning from the 1931 film Frankenstein. Marge's warnings quickly became a burden to write, particularly because – as she herself noted – they were mostly ignored, so after "Treehouse of Horror V", they were dropped. The segment returned in the season 31 episode "Thanksgiving of Horror".

Other Treehouse of Horror episodes have opened with parodies; for example, "Treehouse of Horror III" had Homer introduce the episode in a manner similar to Alfred Hitchcock in Alfred Hitchcock Presents, "Treehouse of Horror IV" had Bart introduce the episode and segments in a manner similar to Night Gallery, and "Treehouse of Horror V" featured a parody of The Outer Limits. The sixth and seventh episodes featured short clips with no lines because the episodes had run long, and longer segments were cut. Following "Treehouse of Horror VII", the opening has been upwards of a minute long and sometimes featured an introduction by a character, such as Mr. Burns in "Treehouse of Horror XVII" or included over-the-top violence, such as "Treehouse of Horror VIII" (which showed a Fox Network censor being brutally murdered) and "Treehouse of Horror XIV" (which showed the Simpson family killing each other).

In the opening segment of the first five episodes, the camera zooms through a cemetery where tombstones with humorous epitaphs can be seen. These messages include the names of canceled shows from the previous season, deceased celebrities such as Walt Disney and Jim Morrison, and a tombstone with an inscription that read "TV violence" that was riddled with bullets as the camera panned on it. They were last used in "Treehouse of Horror V", which included a solitary tombstone with the words "Amusing Tombstones" to signal this. The tombstone gags were easy for the writers in the first episode, but like Marge's warnings, they eventually got more difficult to write, so they were abandoned. Another reason they were dropped was that the tombstones would list television shows that had been canceled the previous season; after a few years, several of the shows that were canceled were produced by former Simpsons writers. However, after two decades, this gag made a brief comeback in "Treehouse of Horror XXIX" at the very beginning, this time appearing before the main opening sequence and title.

While the early Treehouse of Horror episodes featured a Halloween themed opening sequence, the later ones only included the title and the "created by" and "developed by" credits. Every episode between "Treehouse of Horror III" and "Treehouse of Horror X" featured a couch gag with a Halloween theme, including the Simpson family dressed as skeletons, zombies, and characters from previous Halloween episodes.

=== Wraparounds ===
The first four Treehouse of Horror episodes had brief wraparounds that occurred before each segment and loosely tied together all three stories. "Treehouse of Horror" was the only one that actually included a treehouse as a setting. In that episode, Bart and Lisa sat in it telling stories to each other. "Treehouse of Horror II" presented all of the segments as being nightmares of Lisa, Bart and Homer; "Treehouse of Horror III" had Lisa, Bart and Grampa telling stories at a Halloween party; and "Treehouse of Horror IV" is presented by Bart in a parody of Rod Serling's Night Gallery. After a few years, the amount of broadcast time for an episode was shortened, allowing less time to tell a proper story. There were no wraparounds for "Treehouse of Horror V" because they had been cut to make more time for the segments. Following that, the writers permanently dropped them (excluding "Treehouse of Horror Presents: Simpsons Wicked This Way Comes").

=== Kang and Kodos ===
Two characters that are virtually exclusive to the Treehouse of Horror series are Kang and Kodos, a pair of large green space aliens who were introduced in the "Hungry are the Damned" segment of "Treehouse of Horror". Kang and Kodos have since appeared in every Treehouse of Horror episode, often in cameos. In some episodes, they only appear in the opening segment, but often they will make a cameo appearance in the middle of a different story. For example, a story about zombies attacking the town briefly cuts to them in their space ship, watching the events and laughing maniacally at the Earthlings' suffering. The action then switches back to the actual story. According to Al Jean in 2022, an unofficial rule is that they must be in every episode, although quite often they will be forgotten and are added at the last moment, resulting in only a brief appearance. Their scene in "Treehouse of Horror VIII" nearly did not make the final cut of the episode, but David X. Cohen managed to persuade the producers to leave the scene in.

Kang and Kodos were prominent characters in the 2015 episode "The Man Who Came to Be Dinner", which was not Halloween themed.

=== Scary names ===
The "scary names" for the writers in "Treehouse of Horror IV".

Beginning with "Treehouse of Horror II", the producers decided to give the cast and crew of the show 'scary names' in the opening and closing credits. Although the names quickly became more silly than scary, there have been a wide variety of special credits, from simple names like "Bat Groening" or "Chains Hell Brooks" to complex ones like "Dan CastellanetarghaGAHEGGA (Smash) Gurgle Mr. Hyde".

The idea for 'scary names' came from executive producer Al Jean, who was inspired by EC Comics because some of the issues also used 'scary' alternate names. The "scary names" became such a burden to write that they were cut for "Treehouse of Horror XII" and "Treehouse of Horror XIII", but after hearing complaints from the fans, Jean decided to bring them back. Matt Groening's rule for the "scary names" is that they cannot be longer than a person's real name, but this is rarely followed by anyone else.

=== Cultural references ===
References to films, novels, plays, television shows, and other media are commonly featured, and many segments have been parodies of a specific work in the horror, science fiction, or fantasy genre. Many segments are spoofs of episodes of The Twilight Zone, and entire segments will be based on a single episode. Some of the Twilight Zone episodes parodied include "A Kind of a Stopwatch", "To Serve Man", "A Small Talent for War", "Living Doll", "Nightmare at 20,000 Feet", "Little Girl Lost", and "The Little People". The "Bart's Nightmare" segment of "Treehouse of Horror II" parodies the episode "It's a Good Life" and is even presented in a format similar to an episode of The Twilight Zone.

Horror and thriller films parodied include The Exorcist, The Amityville Horror, King Kong, Night of the Living Dead, The Shining, A Nightmare on Elm Street, The Fly, Paranormal Activity, and Dead Calm. Robert Englund had a cameo appearance in "Treehouse of Horror IX" as his character from A Nightmare on Elm Street, Freddy Krueger. Science fiction films have also occasionally been used as inspiration for segments, and in later episodes, many of the segments were based more on science fiction than horror. Science fiction works parodied include The Omega Man, the novel Nineteen Eighty-Four, E.T. the Extra-Terrestrial, The Island of Doctor Moreau, and Orson Welles's The War of the Worlds radio broadcast. In "Treehouse of Horror", Edgar Allan Poe's poem "The Raven" is read by James Earl Jones, while the parts are acted by various characters.

From the late 1990s, parodies have included films and television specials in more varied genres, including Mr. & Mrs. Smith; It's the Great Pumpkin, Charlie Brown; Transformers; Sweeney Todd; the Twilight film series; and Jumanji.

== Production ==
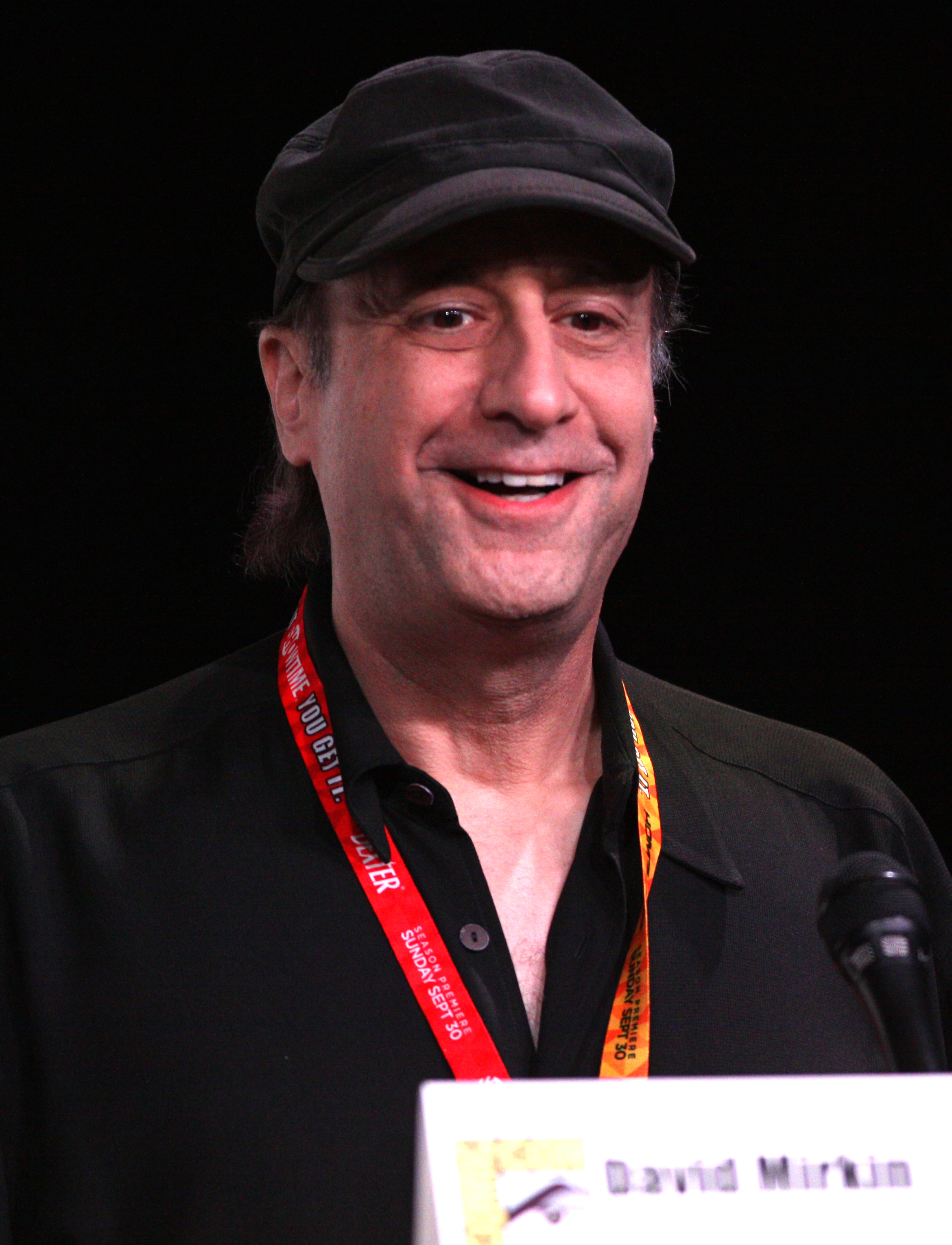
David Mirkin believes the episodes should be both scary and funny and has been responsible for some of the more gruesome moments.

The first Treehouse of Horror installment aired in 1990 as part of the second season, and its on-screen title was "The Simpsons Halloween Special". ("Treehouse of Horror XIII" was the first to feature "Treehouse of Horror" in the on-screen title.) It was inspired by EC Comics Horror tales. Although every episode is entitled Treehouse of Horror, the first was the only episode that actually used the treehouse motif. During production of the first episode, Matt Groening was nervous about "The Raven" segment, and felt it would be "the worst, most pretentious thing [they had] ever done."

The Treehouse of Horror episodes are difficult for both the writers and the animators. The episodes were originally written at the beginning of the production run, but in later seasons they were written at the end and aired at the beginning of the next season as holdovers, giving the animators more time to work. Part of the difficulty for the animators is that the episodes always involve many complex backgrounds, new characters and new designs. They are difficult for the writers because they must produce three stories, an opening and, in the early episodes, a wraparound. They would have to try to fit all of this into a 20–22 minute episode. The episodes often go through many last minute changes, with rewrites requiring new lines to be recorded. "Treehouse of Horror III" in particular underwent somewhere between 80 and 100 line changes in the six-week period between the arrival of the animation from Korea and the airing of the episode. By the fourth season, executive producers Al Jean and Mike Reiss were less enamored of Treehouse of Horror episodes and considered dropping them, but the other writers insisted that they be kept.

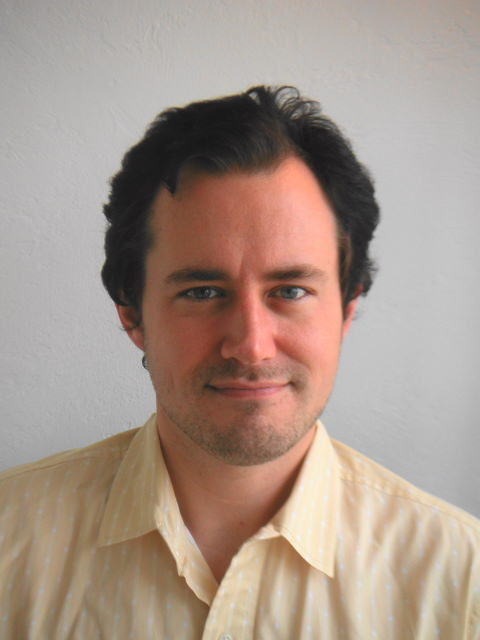
Bill Oakley (along with Josh Weinstein) executive produced two episodes and wrote one segment.

Part of the attraction for the writers is that they are able to break the rules and include violence that would not make a regular episode. In some cases, the writers will have an idea that is too violent and far-fetched or too short for a normal episode, but can be used as a segment in the seasonal special. Several of the writers, former executive producer David Mirkin among them, believe that the episodes should be scary and not just funny. "Treehouse of Horror V" was described by Mirkin as being one of "the most intense, disturbing Halloween show ever" as it was filled with violence and gore in response to new censorship rules. Early episodes seem mild compared to the carnage that followed in later episodes, according to Jean, who calls it "a societal thing". He points out that his 10-year-old daughter loves films like Coraline, and that, "[in] the age of scary stories [...] appropriateness has gotten lower."

Although gruesome for the most part, some segments, such as "Citizen Kang" in "Treehouse of Horror VII", satirize political issues. The opening segment of "Treehouse of Horror XIX" featured Homer attempting to vote for Barack Obama but a rigged electronic voting machine instead registers a vote for John McCain. Rather than taking sides in the election, Jean says it is "mostly a comment on what many people believe to be the irregularities in our voting system". In "Treehouse of Horror XVII", a segment called "The Day the Earth Looked Stupid" ends with Kang and Kodos taking over Springfield as part of a mission called "Operation: Enduring Occupation". The script originally called for Kodos and Kang to look over the smoking ruins of Springfield and say: "This sure is a lot like Iraq will be." The Fox network did not have any objection to the line, but it was rejected by some of the writers as too obvious and was cut from the broadcast. While cut from the aired version, the line does appear in the "review" version sent to newspapers and magazines.

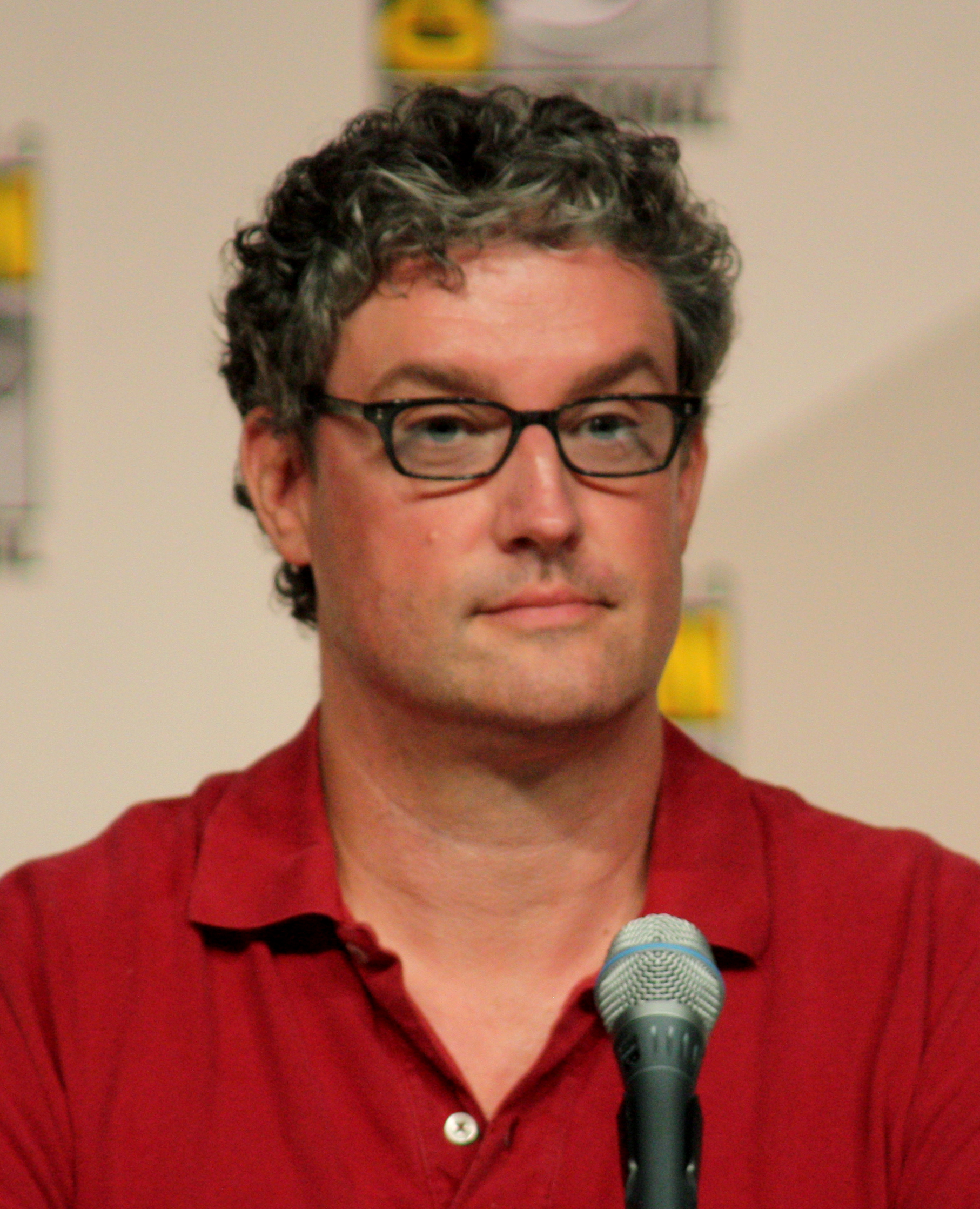
Al Jean has been executive producer for more Treehouse of Horror episodes than any other EP.

The first Treehouse of Horror episode marked the first time that an alternate version of the theme that airs over the end credits was used. Originally, it was intended to use a theremin, but one could not be found that could hit all the necessary notes. The closing of "Treehouse of Horror IV" features a version of the theme that is a combination of the instruments used in The Munsters theme song and the harpsichord and clicking from the Addams Family theme song. Usually when the producers submit an episode for the Primetime Emmy Award for "Outstanding Individual Achievement in Music Composition for a Series (Dramatic Underscore)", they submit a Treehouse of Horror episode, and to date, seven episodes have been nominated.

Üter Zörker is so far the only human character introduced in a Treehouse of Horror to make it into canon. His debut episode was "Treehouse of Horror IV" in the segment "Terror at 5 1/2 Feet". He is an obese German exchange student obsessed with candy and was voiced by Russi Taylor until her death.

2019's Treehouse of Horror was the 666th episode of the series. For the 34th season of The Simpsons, two Treehouse of Horror episodes were produced; the first episode was "Not It", a parody of the 2017 supernatural horror film It and its 2019 sequel It Chapter Two.

== Scheduling ==
Although Treehouse of Horror episodes are Halloween-branded, for several years, they premiered in November due to Fox's coverage of Major League Baseball's World Series. Season 12's "Treehouse of Horror XI" was the first episode to air in November. There have been several references to this in the show, such as in Season 15's "Treehouse of Horror XIV" where Kang looks at a TV Guide and says, "Pathetic humans. They're showing a Halloween episode... in November!" and Kodos replies "Who's still thinking about Halloween? We've already got our Christmas decorations up!" The camera then cuts to a shot of the fireplace with Christmas decorations, and festive Christmas music plays over the opening credits. Season 21's "Treehouse of Horror XX" aired October 18, before the World Series, but the following year's episode, Season 22's "Treehouse of Horror XXI", aired on November 7. Season 23's "Treehouse of Horror XXII" aired on October 30 as the 2011 World Series (which went the maximum of seven games) had concluded on October 28.

Subsequent Treehouse of Horror episodes have premiered in October, although they have moved back to November on occasion. The 31st season included a Thanksgiving-themed spinoff, "Thanksgiving of Horror". The 32nd season however pushed "Treehouse of Horror XXXI" to November 1, 2020, because the National League Championship Series went into Game 7, with the World Series that followed stretching to Game 6, resulting in Fox airing Treehouse after Halloween for the first time since 2010. Citytv in Canada however aired the episode as originally scheduled. "Treehouse of Horror XXXII" aired on October 10, 2021, to avoid airing in November due to the World Series overrun, and, with no 2022 World Series game scheduled on a Sunday, "Treehouse of Horror XXXIII" aired on October 30, 2022. "Treehouse of Horror XXXIV", however, aired on November 5, 2023, and "Treehouse of Horror XXXV" aired on November 3, 2024. as the lead-out program following an NFL doubleheader on Fox.

== Merchandise ==
There has been a variety of merchandise based on the Treehouse of Horror episodes, including books, action figures, comic books, video games, DVDs and a "Treehouse of Horror" version of Hasbro's board game Monopoly. Although every Treehouse of Horror episode until "Treehouse of Horror XIX" has been released along with its season in a boxset, in 2003, The Simpsons: Treehouse of Horror DVD was released. It includes Treehouse of Horrors V, VI, VII and XII. A Treehouse of Horror comic book was published annually from 1995 to 2017, and collected into several books, including The Simpsons Treehouse of Horror Fun-Filled Frightfest, Bart Simpson's Treehouse of Horror Spine-Tingling Spooktacular, Bart Simpson's Treehouse of Horror Heebie-Jeebie Hullabaloo and The Simpsons Treehouse of Horror Hoodoo Voodoo Brouhaha.

Several video games based on The Simpsons include levels with a Halloween theme, including The Simpsons: Hit & Run and The Simpsons Game. In 2001, Fox Interactive and THQ released The Simpsons: Night of the Living Treehouse of Horror on Game Boy Color. The entire game has a Halloween theme as the player tries to save the Simpson family from the Treehouse of Horror.

Many of the special character designs featured in the episodes have become action figures. Four different playsets have been made by Playmates Toys and released as Toys "R" Us exclusives:

1. The "Treehouse of Horror I" set was released in 2000 and included a cemetery playset as well as "Devil Flanders", "Bart the Fly", "Vampire Burns", and "King Homer". It also came with an "Evil Krusty Doll" and Gremlin as accessories.
2. The "Treehouse of Horror 2" set was released in 2001 and included an interior alien spaceship playset as well as Kang, Kodos and "Alien Ship Homer". The entire set was based on "Treehouse of Horror".
3. The "Treehouse of Horror 3" set was released in 2002 and included a playset based on the "Ironic Punishment Division" of Hell in "Treehouse of Horror IV". It came with "Donuthead Homer", "Witch Marge", Hugo Simpson and "Dream Invader Willie".
4. The final "Treehouse of Horror 4" set was released in 2003 and included a playset based on Comic Book Guy's "Collector's all-plastic lair". It came with "The Collector", "Clobber Girl Lisa", "Stretch Dude Bart" and Lucy Lawless. All the designs were based on "Treehouse of Horror X".
5. In 2019, Funko revealed a 2-pack Kang and Kodos vinyl figure set presented as an exclusive for the 2019 San Diego Comic-Con, along with a Treehouse of Horror Pop! wave, including King Homer (Treehouse of Horror III), Fly Bart (Treehouse of Horror VIII), Cat Marge (Treehouse of Horror XIII), Demon Lisa (Treehouse of Horror XXV), and Alien Maggie (Treehouse of Horror IX).

After the Playmates Toys sets were finished, McFarlane Toys produced four Treehouse of Horror themed playsets including the "Ironic Punishment Box Set" released in 2004, the "In the Belly of the Boss — Homer & Marge Action Figures" released in 2005, "The Island of Dr. Hibbert Box Set" released in 2006, and a "Lard Lad Box Set" released in 2007.

== Reception ==
The Treehouse of Horror episodes are often among the top-rated episodes of their seasons, and many of the Treehouse of Horrors have generally been well-received by fans. However, like The Simpsons itself, critics have noted a decline in the quality of the later episodes. In its first airing, "Treehouse of Horror" finished with a 15.7 Nielsen rating and a 25% audience share, less than The Cosby Show. It was said that it "set a level of excellence that viewers never expected creator Matt Groening to repeat", although it was also described as "kind of stupid and unsatisfying".

"Treehouse of Horror V" is considered the best episode by several critics: it finished ninth on Entertainment Weekly's top 25 The Simpsons episode list, fifth on AskMen.com's "Top 10: Simpsons Episodes" list, and was named best episode of the sixth season by IGN.com. In 2006, James Earl Jones, who guest starred in "Treehouse of Horror" and "Treehouse of Horror V", was named seventh on IGN's "Top 25 Simpsons Guest Appearances" list.

In 2006, IGN.com published a list of the top ten Treehouse of Horror segments, and they placed "The Shinning" from "Treehouse of Horror V" at the top, saying it was "not only a standout installment of the annual Halloween episode, but of The Simpsons, period". Rounding out the list were "Dial "Z" for Zombies", "The Devil and Homer Simpson", "Time and Punishment", "Hungry Are the Damned", "Clown Without Pity", "Citizen Kang", "If I Only Had a Brain", "Bart Simpson's Dracula", and "Starship Poopers". The third, fourth, and fifth episodes were each represented by two segments. The most recent episode on the list was "Treehouse of Horror IX", from 1998.

In 2000, "Treehouse of Horror VII" was ranked Simpsons creator Matt Groening's seventh-favorite episode, and the line he likes best is: "We have reached the limit of what rectal probing can teach us." "King Homer" of "Treehouse of Horror III" is one of Groening's favorite segments. "Treehouse of Horror III" is also noted for the moment where Homer shoots Ned Flanders and Bart says "Dad, you killed the Zombie Flanders!" only for Homer to reply, "He was a zombie?" It is also one of Groening's favorite lines.

=== Awards ===
In 1996, the "Homer^{3}" segment of "Treehouse of Horror VI" was awarded the Ottawa International Animation Festival grand prize. In 1998, "Treehouse of Horror VIII" won a Golden Reel Award for "Best Sound Editing – Television Animated Specials"; the recipients were Robert Mackston, Travis Powers, Norm MacLeod, and Terry Greene. Bob Beecher also received a nomination for "Best Sound Editing in Television Animation – Music" for "Treehouse of Horror X".

The second, third, fifth, eighth, ninth, fourteenth, fifteenth, and eighteenth Treehouse of Horror episodes were nominated for "Outstanding Individual Achievement in Music Composition for a Series (Dramatic Underscore)" at the Primetime Emmy Awards. The second and third "Treehouse of Horror" episodes were also nominated for "Outstanding Individual Achievement in Sound Mixing for a Comedy Series or a Special". In 1996, "Treehouse of Horror VI" was submitted for the Primetime Emmy Award in the "Outstanding Animated Program (For Programming less than One Hour)" category because it had a 3D animation sequence, which the staff felt would have given it the edge. The episode failed to win, and Bill Oakley later expressed regret about submitting the episode. The twenty-third and twenty-fifth Treehouse of Horror episodes were nominated for the same award in 2013 and 2015 respectively. The thirty-third episode finally won the Emmy.

== See also ==
- List of The Simpsons "Treehouse of Horror" episodes
- "Halloween of Horror", the first Halloween episode not part of the "Treehouse of Horror" series
- "Thanksgiving of Horror", a non-Halloween episode and also not part of the "Treehouse of Horror" series
