= Treehouse of Horror IX =

- The Simpsons episode
- Promotional picture depicting the "Starship Poopers" segment
- Episode no.: Season 10; Episode 4
- Directed by: Steven Dean Moore
- Written by: "Hell Toupée": Donick Cary; "The Terror of Tiny Toon": Larry Doyle; "Starship Poopers": David X. Cohen
- Production code: AABF01
- Original air date: October 25, 1998

Guest appearances
- Robert Englund as Freddy Krueger; Ed McMahon as himself; Jerry Springer as himself; Regis Philbin as himself (live-action sequence); Kathie Lee Gifford as herself (live-action sequence)

Episode features
- Chalkboard gag: Bart paints "The Simpsons Halloween Special IX" on the board with a blood-soaked brush.
- Couch gag: The family never makes it to the living room; Bart slips while skateboarding and hits his head, Lisa gets catapulted into the roof of the garage after tripping over Bart while cycling, and Homer gets run down by Marge's car. In the living room, Freddy Krueger and Jason Voorhees are on the couch wondering where the Simpsons are.
- Commentary: Matt Groening; Mike Scully; George Meyer; Ron Hauge; David X. Cohen; Donick Cary; Steven Dean Moore

Episode chronology
| ← Previous "Bart the Mother" | Next → "When You Dish Upon a Star" |
- The Simpsons season 10

"Treehouse of Horror IX", titled onscreen as "The Simpsons Halloween Special IX", is the fourth episode of the tenth season of the American animated television series The Simpsons. It first aired on Fox in the United States on October 25, 1998. It is the ninth Treehouse of Horror episode, and, like the other "Treehouse of Horror" episodes, contains three self-contained segments: In "Hell Toupée", Homer gets a hair transplant and is possessed by the spirit of an executed criminal; in "The Terror of Tiny Toon", Bart and Lisa are trapped in a special, extremely violent episode of The Itchy & Scratchy Show; and in "Starship Poopers", Marge reveals that Maggie is the product of a one-night stand with the alien Kang.

"Treehouse of Horror IX" was written by Donick Cary, Larry Doyle and David X. Cohen, and directed by Steven Dean Moore. "Terror of Tiny Toon" includes a live-action segment starring Regis Philbin and Kathie Lee Gifford. Jerry Springer and Ed McMahon also appear in the episode, voicing themselves, with Robert Englund vocally reprising the role of Freddy Krueger from the Nightmare on Elm Street series. The episode also features Jason Voorhees from the Friday the 13th series, while various characters visit the talk shows Live with Regis and Kathie Lee and The Jerry Springer Show.

In its original airing on Fox, the episode had an 8.6 Nielsen rating. In 1999, composer Alf Clausen was nominated for a Primetime Emmy Award for Outstanding Music Composition for a Series for his work on the episode.

== Plot ==
=== Opening sequence ===
The opening sequence is exactly the same as normal, but with a dark twist, as Bart does the chalkboard lines in red paint, and then the entire family is killed one by one as they arrive home (Bart falls off his skateboard when he lands on the car, Lisa is catapulted into the garage wall when she strikes Bart in the driveway, and Homer is crushed by Marge and Maggie, who presumably also die in the crash). On the couch, Freddy Krueger and Jason Voorhees are waiting for them and wonder where they are.

=== "Hell Toupée" ===
In a parody of the Amazing Stories episode "Hell Toupee", Snake is arrested for smoking inside the Kwik-E-Mart. Chief Wiggum explains that this is Snake's third strike, so he will be executed in accordance with the three strikes law. Before hauling Snake away, Chief Wiggum points out that Apu, Moe, and Bart are all witnesses; Snake vows to kill them all.

After the execution, which happens on live TV, Homer visits Dr. Nick, who transplants Snake's hair onto Homer's head. When Homer goes to sleep the following night, it plants its roots in Homer's brain. With the hair controlling his mind, Homer murders both Apu and Moe. Bart realizes that the other two witnesses have been killed, and Homer vows to protect him. Homer locks himself and Bart in a room, but Snake's hair takes control of him. Homer tries to kill Bart with a sledgehammer. Bart begs Homer to fight the hair. After a struggle, Homer rips the hair off his head. However, the scalp comes to life, attempting to suffocate Bart whilst Homer ineffectually punches it, if anything hurting Bart. Wiggum bursts in and shoots the hair dead, then wryly comments on how it has been "a bad hair day", causing everyone to laugh. Marge tries to remind everyone about the two murders, but then suddenly gets the joke and joins in.

=== "The Terror of Tiny Toon" ===
In a parody of Stay Tuned, Marge forbids Bart and Lisa from watching the Itchy & Scratchy Halloween special while she goes trick-or-treating with Maggie, removing the batteries from the remote control. When Marge leaves, Bart finds plutonium in Homer's toolbox and hammers it into the remote's battery slot. When they use the remote, the kids enter the world of Itchy and Scratchy, and begin to laugh at their antics, angering the cat-and-mouse duo, who proceed to hunt them to teach them a lesson.

Back in the Simpson house, Homer enters the living room and watches the show. Oblivious to what he sees, Homer decides to change the channel and Bart, Lisa, Itchy, and Scratchy wind up on Live with Regis and Kathie Lee. They disrupt the cooking segment of the show with Regis Philbin and Kathie Lee Gifford, causing Gifford to call it a day while stating that Dom DeLuise can interview himself. Bart, Lisa, Itchy, and Scratchy then end up back at Itchy's house. They urge Homer from inside the TV to use the remote to get them out, and he eventually succeeds just as Marge and Maggie arrive home.

Unfortunately, Itchy and Scratchy also escape. At first, the family is screaming in horror, but soon realize how small the pair actually are, and decide to keep them as pets. After seeing Scratchy fall in love with Snowball II, Marge decides to have him neutered, much to his horror.

=== "Starship Poopers" ===
Marge discovers Maggie's first baby tooth, which appears to be a sharp fang. Maggie later loses her legs and sprouts green tentacles. Maggie's pacifier sucks contact the alien duo Kang and Kodos. They arrive at the Simpson house, coming to retrieve Maggie. Marge reveals that Kang is Maggie's real father and explains how it happened.

Kang and Kodos demand that the Simpsons give Maggie to them, but Homer refuses which starts a big fight between Kang and Homer until Bart suggests that they appear on The Jerry Springer Show to resolve their issues. When an audience member criticizes Kang, he vaporizes her, as well as the rest of the audience and the film crew. Everyone looks guiltily as host Jerry Springer does a monologue encouraging them to put their differences aside and do what is best for Maggie. However, Maggie attacks Springer, killing him, causing Kang and Homer to fight again, much to Marge's embarrassment.

After leaving the studio, Kang and Kodos threaten to destroy every politician in Washington unless given Maggie. Marge slyly implies that the aliens could not possibly destroy every politician, and they fly off to do so. As the Simpsons prepare to head home, Maggie says in Kang's voice that she will drive, and laughs diabolically before stating that she needs blood as the credits begin.

== Production ==
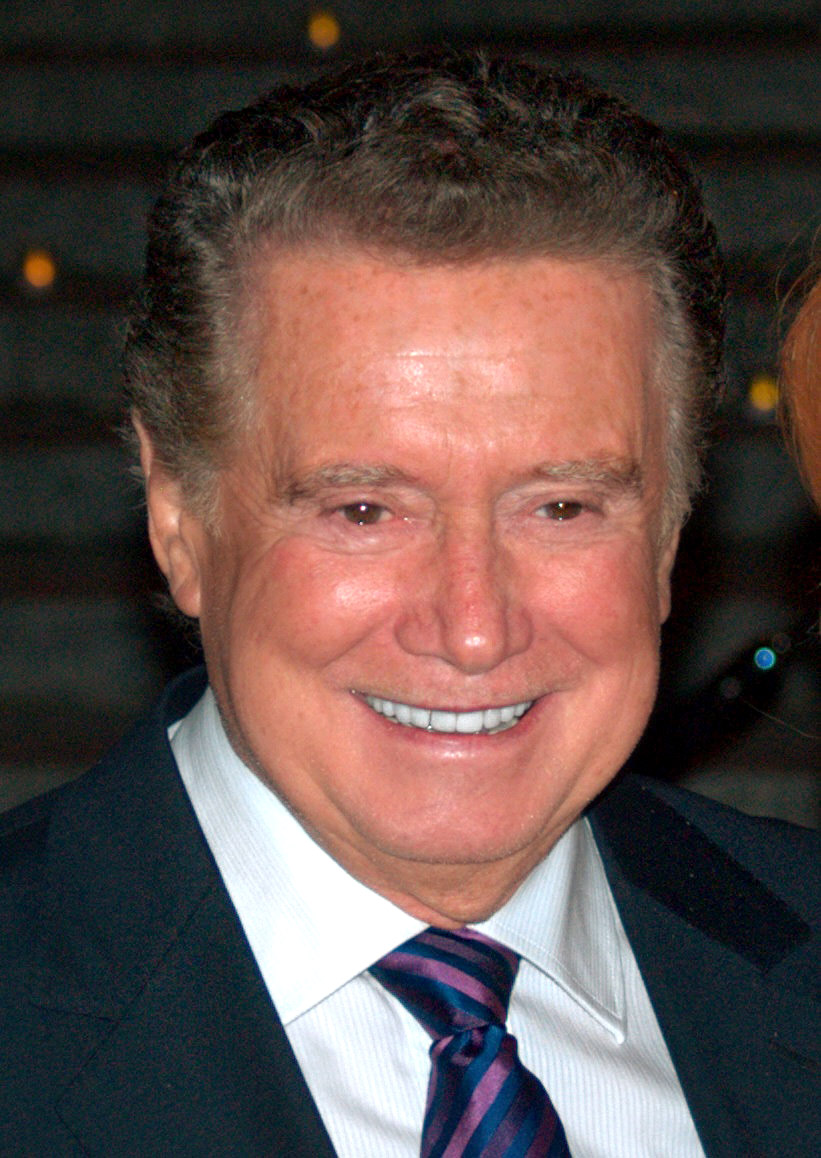
Regis Philbin guest starred as himself in a live-action sequence in "Terror of Tiny Toon".

Much like the other Treehouse of Horror episodes up to that point, the segments of "Treehouse of Horror IX" were credited to different writers. "Hell Toupée" was written by Donick Cary. "Terror of Tiny Toon" was written by Larry Doyle. "Starship Poopers" was written by David X. Cohen and, until season 32's "Podcast News", was the last writing credit he ever received for the show. The episode continues the Treehouse of Horror tradition of having the credits re-written as "scary names". Cohen's executive producer credit is "David 'Watch Futurama' Cohen" in a reference to the show Futurama, created by Cohen and Matt Groening, which premiered 5 months later.

Much of the animation in the first segment, "Hell Toupée", was worked on by assistant director Chris Clements. Moe's death scene was originally more violent, but it was toned down at the request of Mike Scully.

The title of the second segment, "The Terror of Tiny Toon", is a reference of the animated series Tiny Toon Adventures, as well as the movie The Terror of Tiny Town. The animators looked forward to working on this segment because they were fans of Itchy & Scratchy. Poochie from the Simpsons episode "The Itchy & Scratchy & Poochie Show" makes a cameo during this segment.

The title of the third segment, "Starship Poopers", is a reference to the film Starship Troopers. During this segment, there is a shot of sound waves emanating from Springfield. At one point, there is a shot of North America and it appears that Springfield is located in Louisiana. The mystery of the location of Springfield is a running joke in The Simpsons, and a number of fans assumed that Louisiana was where the family lived. However, the animators had drawn the waves so that they were coming from the center of the screen, and they never intended to have them emanate from a specific location. In one scene, Marge is abducted by Kang and Kodos, who lasso her then pull her into the ship. According to Cohen, it is a running gag that Kang and Kodos' abduction methods are never the same. Maggie has a line at the end of the episode, where she sounds like Kang; she was voiced by Kang's usual voice actor Harry Shearer.

The couch gag features Freddy Krueger from the Nightmare on Elm Street series and Jason Voorhees from the Friday the 13th series. Freddy is voiced by Robert Englund, who portrayed the character in eight films. Three talk show hosts appear in the episode: in "The Terror of Tiny Toon", Bart, Lisa, Itchy, and Scratchy accidentally visit Live with Regis and Kathie Lee in a live-action segment featuring Regis Philbin and Kathie Lee Gifford and directed by Donick Cary; while in "Starship Poopers", the Simpson family and Kang appear on The Jerry Springer Show, with host Jerry Springer voicing himself; his lines were recorded by Julie Thacker. The theme music used for The Jerry Springer Show is the Mr Sparkle theme from "In Marge We Trust". For the Regis and Kathie Lee sequence, the soup splash was created by dropping an item into the pot, then adding the animated characters over it. The taping of this scene took longer than expected, so a broadcast of WABC-TV's Eyewitness News that was to take place (the show was, and continues to be, taped at the facilities of WABC in New York, where it originated in 1983) had to be moved to another studio.

== Reception ==
In its original airing on Fox, the episode had an 8.6 Nielsen rating and was viewed in approximately 8.5 million homes. It finished the week ranked 35th. It was the fifth highest rated show on Fox that week, after two games of the 1998 World Series, a World Series pre-game show, and Ally McBeal.

The authors of the book I Can't Believe It's a Bigger and Better Updated Unofficial Simpsons Guide, Warren Martyn and Adrian Wood, wrote, "Another collection of horrors, of varying degrees of wit. The Itchy and Scratchy one is by far the best, and Starship Poopers is only really amusing once the Jerry Springer segment begins." Colin Jacobson of DVD Movie Guide gave the episode a positive review saying "The series usually rises to the occasion of its Halloween episodes, and 'IX' doesn’t disappoint. Each of the three stories satisfies, as they offer a lot of clever, amusing moments. 'Toupée' is probably the best, though, as it's the most creative of the bunch. While funny, the other two can be a bit predictable." Kay McFadden of The Seattle Times wrote that the episode is "certainly not on a par with that all-time doppelganger classic, 'Treehouse of Horror VII', [...] still, No. 9's dialogue is sharp and there's reassuring continuity to such beloved institutions as Itchy and Scratchy."

In 2008, "Starship Poopers" was named the tenth best Treehouse of Horror segment by IGN. They wrote that "While [it is] not the best Kang & Kodos segment, 'Starship Poopers' delivers consistent laughs and a great ending, as Kang & Kodos vow to destroy all the politicians in Washington (to the Simpsons' delight) and Maggie creepily laughs and says, 'I need blood.'" In 1999, composer Alf Clausen was nominated for a Primetime Emmy Award for Outstanding Music Composition for a Series for his work on the episode.
