= Treehouse of Horror VIII =

- The Simpsons episode
- Fox Censor talking to the audience while the rating icon reaches out with a sword. This scene had a difficult time getting through the real-life censors.
- Episode no.: Season 9 Episode 4
- Directed by: Mark Kirkland
- Written by: The HΩmega Man: Mike Scully; Fly vs. Fly: David X. Cohen; Easy-Bake Coven: Ned Goldreyer
- Production code: 5F02
- Original air date: October 26, 1997

Episode features
- Couch gag: The Simpsons sit on their couch. Electric metal shackles restrain their wrists and ankles and electric metal helmets come down on their heads. The family writhes in pain as they get shocked by electricity.
- Commentary: Matt Groening; Mike Scully; David X. Cohen; Mark Kirkland; George Meyer; Matt Selman

Episode chronology
← Previous "Lisa's Sax"	Next → "The Cartridge Family"
- The Simpsons season 9

"Treehouse of Horror VIII", titled onscreen as "The Simpsons Halloween Special VIII", is the fourth episode of the ninth season of the American animated television series The Simpsons. It first aired on Fox in the United States on October 26, 1997. In the eighth annual Treehouse of Horror episode, Homer Simpson is the last Springfieldian left alive when a neutron bomb destroys Springfield until a gang of mutants come after him, Homer buys a transporter that Bart uses to switch bodies with a housefly, and Marge is accused of witchcraft in a Puritan rendition of Springfield in 1649. It was written by Mike Scully, David X. Cohen and Ned Goldreyer, and was directed by Mark Kirkland.

== Plot ==
=== Opening ===
A censor for the Fox network is sitting at his desk going through the show's script, censoring some things and explaining to the audience that the episode is rated TV-G with no violence or anything explicit. As he continues talking, a hand reaches with a sword from the rating and stabs him many times with the rating changing from TV-G to TV-PG, TV-14, TV-MA to the fictional ratings TV-21 and TV-666. He falls on his desk dead and his blood spells the title, "The Simpsons Halloween Special VIII".

=== "The HΩmega Man" ===
After Mayor Quimby makes an offensive joke about France, as retaliation, the French president launches a neutron bomb directly into Springfield, thus vaporizing everyone except Homer, who had been inspecting a bomb shelter that he was considering buying from Herman. Homer emerges and seems to be the last remaining person in Springfield left unharmed. Initially grieving for his loved ones, Homer perks up, realizing that being the last person allows him to do everything he always wanted to.

While dancing naked in church, he is confronted by a band of hostile Springfield citizens who have become mutants from the blast. Homer flees back home where he discovers that his family survived as their house was protected by its many layers of lead paint. Marge and the children kill the mutants with shotguns and then the family heads off to steal some Ferraris.

=== "Fly vs. Fly" ===
While visiting a yard sale, Homer buys a matter transporter from Professor Frink. Bart sees the family pets inadvertently go through the transporter together, resulting in a DNA mismatch. This gives him the idea to enter the teleporter with a fly, thinking that he will become a mutant superhero. However, the machine simply switches their heads around.

Bart appeals to Lisa for help, but she is chased by the fly and cornered in the kitchen. Bart tries to stop the fighting, but is eaten by the fly. Lisa then pushes the fly into the teleporter. Bart comes out the other end, fully restored. Homer furiously tries to kill Bart with an axe, while the family watches.

=== "Easy-Bake Coven" ===
In 1649, the town is witness to many witch burnings. In the church, the townspeople try to figure out whom to condemn next. People begin accusing others and soon they erupt into chaos, until Marge intervenes.

She tries to talk sense into the townspeople, but Moe accuses her of being a witch. Quimby assures her that she is entitled to due process which means she will be thrown off a cliff with a broomstick; if she is a witch she will be able to fly to safety, in which case the authorities expect her to report back for punishment. If she is not a witch, then she will fall to an honorable Christian death. After being shoved off the cliff, Marge flies up on the broomstick revealing that she really is a witch, turning Chief Wiggum into a giant gopher and officers Lou and Eddie into a fairy and snowman, before returning to her sisters Patty and Selma. The sisters watch Ned and Maude Flanders talking about how the witches eat children, which gives them the notion to do just that. They knock on the Flanders' door and demand their sons, but before they leave, Maude offers the witches gingerbread men instead. The witches like these better than the children so they go to each house, getting goodies in exchange for not eating the children. As they fly off, Captain McCallister says that is how the tradition of Halloween and trick-or-treating started.

== Production ==
"The HΩmega Man" was written by Mike Scully, "Fly Vs. Fly" was written by David X. Cohen, and "Easy-Bake Coven" was written by Ned Goldreyer. Large portions of the "Fly vs. Fly" segment were cut, including the original ending where the fly also emerges from the teleporter, but is considerably larger and the Simpson family ride it to the mall.

The producers had trouble with the censors over several segments in this episode. The opening segment of the episode, which features the aforementioned Fox Censor being stabbed to death, was pitched by David Mirkin and had a difficult time getting through the real-life censors. They had issues with the size of the knife and the sound effects used. Originally, the TV-rating was supposed to stab Censor with a dagger, but Fox objected because it was too gruesome and was changed to a cutlass. The censors also objected to an unaired scene where Homer does his naked church dance on an altar. The scene was reanimated so that Homer was dancing naked in the front row.

This episode was the only Treehouse of Horror episode that was directed by Mark Kirkland. It was also the last episode Brad Bird worked on; he left the show to direct The Iron Giant at Warner Bros. Feature Animation. "Easy-Bake Coven" was storyboarded by Kirkland and the backgrounds were designed by Lance Wilder. Although Kang and Kodos make appearances in every Treehouse of Horror episode, their brief appearance in this one was nearly cut. David X. Cohen persuaded the producers to leave the scene in.

== Cultural references ==
"The HΩmega Man" is an extended homage to The Omega Man, which was one of Mike Scully's favorite movies as a child. In the segment, Homer runs over Johnny and Edgar Winter while fleeing the mutants pursuing him, mistaking them as mutants as the Winter brothers are both albino. Homer does not seem to "get" Gary Larson's calendar. In the movie theater Homer watches a David Spade/Chris Farley comedy; just six and a half weeks after the episode aired, Farley died of a drug overdose at age 33.

The title "Fly vs. Fly" is a reference to the Mad magazine comic strip Spy vs. Spy. The segment itself is based on the film The Fly, with elements from the remake by David Cronenberg, primarily the telepod design. Lisa picks up a devil's tuning fork at Prof. Frink's yard sale.

"Easy Bake Coven" makes a reference to Bewitched; when Patty and Selma refer to Homer as "Derwood", Marge corrects them, "His name is Homer." In Bewitched, Samantha's mother Endora often referred to Darrin as "Derwood" (among other things), whereupon Samantha often corrected her with "His name is Darrin." Selma's line "If I knew you were comin' I'd've baked a cat" is a reference to the 1951 song "If I Knew You Were Comin' I'd've Baked a Cake". The animators rewatched the movie The Crucible several times when designing the characters and backgrounds for Sprynge-Fielde, 1649 A.D. Edna Krabappel has a scarlet A embroidered on her chest as a reference to Hester Prynne's punishment for adultery in the novel The Scarlet Letter.

== Reception ==
In its original broadcast, "Treehouse of Horror VIII" finished 18th in ratings for the week of October 20–26, 1997, with a Nielsen rating of 11.2, equivalent to approximately 10.9 million viewing households. It was the highest-rated show on the Fox network that week, beating King of the Hill.

"Treehouse of Horror VIII" won a Golden Reel Award in 1998 for "Best Sound Editing – Television Animated Specials" for Robert Mackston, Travis Powers, Norm MacLeod and Terry Greene. Alf Clausen received an Emmy Award nomination for "Outstanding Music Composition for a Series (Dramatic Underscore)" for this episode, which he ultimately lost. The A.V. Club named Comic Book Guy's line "Oh, I've wasted my life" as one of the quotes from The Simpsons that can be used in everyday situations.

In a retrospective review for The A.V. Club, Erik Adams praised Clausen's score, "its mournful oboe like a fall breeze shaking the last leaves from the branches. The 'Treehouse' franchise is a yearly showcase for Clausen's work, and he doesn't disappoint here." The original "Treehouse of Horror" was the first episode scored by Clausen.
