= Not Penis Cream =

EP by I Voted for Kodos
- Released: May 16, 2003
- Genre: Ska punk
- Length: 26 minutes
- Label: Classic Filth

I Voted for Kodos chronology
Close Enough For Ska (2000)	Not Penis Cream (2003)	My New Obsession (2006)

Not Penis Cream is the first EP release by the band I Voted for Kodos. It was released after their first album Close Enough For Ska, and features the same style of ska punk.

The name "Not Penis Cream" (and also a song on the EP) was inspired by a Saturday Night Live skit from 1994. The skit featured Steve Martin selling his own brand of beauty product called "Penis Beauty Cream." The cover of the EP has a brown paper package with the words "Not Penis Cream" labeled across the front in block red letters, just as described by Steve Martin in the SNL skit.

== Track listing ==
1. "On The Phone"
2. "Pastaroni"
3. "Where Are We Going To"
4. "Not Penis Cream"
5. "All I Have Left"
6. "I Tied My Own Shoes Today"

== Credits ==
- Rick Bisenius - lead vocals, trombone, moog
- Chris Holoyda - guitar
- Lee Gordon – mellophone, backing vocals, guitar
- Nick Rydell - alto sax
- Andrew Anderson - piano, organ, trumpet
- Ross Gilliland - bass, backing vocals
- Paul Reinke - drums
- Andrew "Dafe" Fenton - guitar
- Tom Kaboski - tenor sax on tracks 1 & 2
- Dave Bartov - trumpet on tracks 1 & 2, lyrics on track 2
