= Treehouse of Horror XXIX =

- The Simpsons episode
- Promotional poster
- Episode no.: Season 30; Episode 4
- Directed by: Matthew Faughnan
- Written by: Joel H. Cohen
- Production code: XABF16
- Original air date: October 21, 2018

Guest appearance
- Maurice LaMarche as Himself

Episode chronology
← Previous "My Way or the Highway to Heaven"	Next → "Baby You Can't Drive My Car"
- The Simpsons season 30

"Treehouse of Horror XXIX" is the 643rd episode of the American animated television series The Simpsons, the fourth episode of season 30 and the twenty-ninth "Treehouse of Horror" episode. It aired in the United States on Fox on October 21, 2018. The episode was directed by Matthew Faughnan and written by Joel H. Cohen.

In this episode, the townsfolk are replaced by plant versions of themselves, Lisa starts killing Bart's friends, and the DNA of the elderly is mixed with dinosaur DNA. The episode received negative reviews.

== Plot ==
=== Opening sequence ===
The episode starts in Fogburyport, birthplace of Green Clam Chowder. The Simpson family arrive there because a travel book stated it's a good place to visit. It is revealed to be a trap and the Simpsons are told they will be devoured by Cthulhu. However, Homer states that he was promised an oyster eating contest against Cthulhu, and Homer beats him. Cthulhu pukes and asks what Homer wants as a reward. Homer whispers "I want to eat you."

Cthulhu is seen in a giant cooking pot and the Simpsons (except Lisa) enjoy a hot dog made of Cthulhu's tentacles. Homer then pokes Cthulhu's head with a trident, and his ink spells the title of the episode and the opening credits. This sequence is a reference to the novel The Shadow over Innsmouth by H. P. Lovecraft.

=== Intrusion of the Pod-y Switchers ===
The segment begins at the underwater base of Mapple, where Steve Mobbs (on a screen) tells about the new Myphone and the new unfunny version of himself to an excited audience. When everyone is on their phone, the unfunny Steve is revealed to be a plant alien on a mission. The plant aliens launch to Earth (passing the Futurama ship with a banner reading "BRING BACK FUTURAMA", which is then getting blown up by The Orville). The spores cause everyone in Springfield to turn into plant versions of themselves. The transformed citizens are taken to a utopian plant planet with no technology. The Plant People see the citizens with pods (Mapple products) and ask where they found those. Bart says they found it under the living Christmas tree.

=== Multiplisa-ty ===
After a sleepover at the Van Houten's, Milhouse, Nelson, and Bart find themselves in a cell, trapped by Lisa. She is suffering from dissociative identity disorder (similar to James McAvoy's character from Split), and threatens them with continued imprisonment after they do not ask for an encore on her performance.

During a series of personality changes, Lisa attacks and kills Nelson, and transforms Milhouse into a "paper boy" before telling Bart what he did to anger her: Bart changed Lisa's answers on a spelling test, resulting in an F. Lisa changes again and gives Bart a last chance to save himself. He apologizes and pledges his brotherly love for her, saving himself from being killed by trash. Returning to her normal self, Lisa confesses to Marge, admitting that the lack of affection she had received caused her to snap, and Marge admits she sympathizes with Lisa, revealing that she locked Homer in the trunk of her car for forgetting their anniversary.

=== Geriatric Park ===
In a parody of Jurassic Park, Mr. Burns opens up a Jurassic-themed retirement home, filled with elders rejuvenated by mixing their DNA with dinosaurs. Initially the resident are all human, healthy, young and with incredible strength. When Homer adjusts the thermostat after Grampa complains about being too cold, the elders transform into dinosaur versions of themselves and begin killing their visitors. Lisa courageously confronts Grampa and discovers that they all just want to be cherished and respected. In the end, the Simpson family escape alive and unharmed, though their helicopter is being flown on the back of the transformed Agnes.

== Reception ==
Tony Sokol of Den of Geek gave the episode 3 out of 5 points ranking, stating "Ultimately this is a disappointing Halloween installment, not horrifyingly though. We rely on The Simpsons' 'Treehouse of Horror' stories to be the high point of any season. They have consistently been immediate classics. But "XXIX" is only lukewarm. The series has been edging closer to the "clever" side of humor over the irreverently silly, and the laughs are increasingly muted. This episode hosts some of the largest creatures of the world of terror, dinosaurs and Cthulhu. It's a shame the laughs aren't bigger.

Dennis Perkins of The A.V. Club gave the episode a C+ ranking, stating "It’s tempting after a dully serviceable outing like this to say it’s time to bury the ‘Treehouse of Horror’ concept as an unnecessary annual disappointment. But then you'd have to say that of the series itself, which, okay, some of you do. I'd maintain that The Simpsons’ decades-long role as pop cultural ‘not as good as it used to be’ punching bag could be reversed with some new creative blood in the form of those writers raised on The Simpsons who want nothing better than to jolt the lumbering comedy behemoth back to life. But, as the show plods on, it seems that that's the one thing those in charge of the shambling enterprise are truly afraid of."

Jesse Schedeen of IGN gave the episode a 5.6 out of 10 points ranking, stating "It almost never feels like there's enough room for the writers to really take advantage of these horror parodies. The result is a lot of easy, surface level gags. More and more I find myself wondering if the series would be better off switching to an hour-long format or, better yet, devoting the entire special to one story."

“Treehouse of Horror XXIX” scored a 1.3 rating with a 6 share and was watched by 2.95 million viewers, making “The Simpsons” Fox's highest rated show of the night.
