= Treehouse of Horror XXX =

- The Simpsons episode
- Promotional poster
- Episode no.: Season 31; Episode 4
- Directed by: Timothy Bailey
- Written by: J. Stewart Burns
- Production code: YABF18
- Original air date: October 20, 2019

Episode chronology
← Previous "The Fat Blue Line"	Next → "Gorillas on the Mast"
- The Simpsons season 31

"Treehouse of Horror XXX" is the fourth episode of the thirty-first season of the American animated television series The Simpsons, and the 666th episode overall as well as the thirtieth Treehouse of Horror episode, consisting of an opening sequence parodying The Omen and three self-contained segments: "Danger Things" (a parody of Stranger Things season 1), "Heaven Swipes Right" (a parody of Heaven Can Wait), and "When Hairy Met Slimy" (a parody of The Shape of Water). It aired in the United States on Fox on October 20, 2019. The episode was written by J. Stewart Burns, and was directed by Timothy Bailey.

In this episode, Lisa tries to retrieve Milhouse from another dimension, Homer dies and returns in another body, and Selma falls in love with Kang. The episode received mixed reviews.

== Plot ==
=== Opening sequence ===
In a parody of The Omen, Homer and Marge bring Maggie home after trading her due to originally having a boy. She shows satanic powers and torments the family and the other people of Springfield. Ned Flanders vows to get rid of the evil by sacrificing her inside the First Church of Springfield, but Homer and Marge stop him. Ned however shows them the Mark of the Beast on her head (a Mickey Mouse's logo, in reference to the Disney acquisition of Fox), and then reveals 666, parodying that this is the 666th episode. Maggie kills all three of them, and the title for the episode appears with the episode number listed as 666 "or 667 if Fox changes the schedule".

=== "Danger Things" ===
The plot is a parody of Stranger Things season 1, featuring Milhouse as Will, Bart as Mike, Nelson as Dustin and Lisa as Eleven.

The story takes place in the 1980s, where after a night of playing the Atari 2600 game E.T. the Extra Terrestrial, Milhouse gets kidnapped by a Demogorgon. A concerned Kirk destroys his wall and creates a Christmas light alphabet communication device (akin to Stranger Things) to look for his son. The device actually works when Milhouse in the Over Under (parody of the "Upside Down") uses it to send an SOS signal to his parents. Milhouse then calls the Simpson house with Lisa picking up. The latter goes to Starcourt Mall to find Bart and Nelson at the arcade. She tells them that Milhouse is still alive and in another dimension; Bart does not realize until Milhouse appears on the game he is playing. They decide to get help from Professor Frink to travel to the Over Under using a sensory deprivation device. As the device requires someone of high intelligence, a freshly-shaved bald Lisa volunteers and finds Milhouse in the other dimension. Whilst escaping, they find an alternate version of Springfield full of Demogorgons (with Comic Book Guy and Moe Szyslak). Lisa and Milhouse are surrounded by Demogorgons until Lisa uses her hidden psychic powers to get rid of the creatures. They are finally saved by Homer, who is working for Mr. Burns's secret government program to find monsters; however he informs them that they are permanently trapped in the new dimension. Lisa is horrified until a Demogorgon informs her that there is affordable housing and excellent schools as well as local shops and restaurants. With this new information, the Simpsons decide to live in the Over Under. Homer is glad that Ned is not there until a Demogorgon version of Ned appears, causing Homer to burn him.

=== "Heaven Swipes Right" ===
In a parody of Heaven Can Wait, Homer, Moe, Lenny and Carl are watching the Springfield Atoms vs. Shelbyville Shelbyvillians football game at the Springfield Atoms Stadium when Homer ends up choking to death on a hotdog. Homer's soul arrives in Heaven meets St. Greeter, who welcomes him with the pun on his name, but Homer does not forgive the pun so he gets damned to Hell. Homer finds out God sold Heaven to Google, before discovering his soul was taken before his time, but cannot be sent back to Earth into his body due to the decay. Homer is given the option to live the life of a man who was going to die that day, so Homer chooses the body of Case Diggs, the new Atoms quarterback. He goes to Marge and she loves the new body, but he ruins it in one night by overeating. Bart and Marge convince him to try Superintendent Chalmers as the next body. At school, Homer makes Principal Skinner give Bart all As and twists his nipple until it is deep purple. When Homer goes to Skinner's house, he discovers that he makes very little money as Superintendent, so Homer changes his body again. Marge has had enough and tells Homer he needs to settle in for one body and stop changing, so he chooses the body of the man that loves her as much as he does, Moe. However, Moe finds himself in Maggie's body and immediately tells Marge that he is thirsty.

=== "When Hairy Met Slimy" ===
In a parody of The Shape of Water, at the Power Plant, Selma enters a maximum-security door to sneak a cigarette. She finds herself in a laboratory, where she meets Kang and they fall in love. After offering to provide the secret to clean, natural energy, Mr. Burns wants to dissect him, so they flee to a distant galaxy, with Homer's help. Selma and Homer sneak Kang out in a waste container full of rats, but Burns finds them. Kang bites off Smithers' head and knocks out Burns, with Barney driving the trio out in his car. Burns and the military follow, but his driver is shot as they flee to Mt. Springfield. Once they escape, Kodos arrives with a spaceship, but a shooting takes place, and Selma is hit in the stomach. Kang then pulls out the Infinity Gauntlet to eliminate all military people, and when Burns survives, he hits him with a tin can. Kang then heals Selma and tells her he is pregnant. Patty arrives, protesting they are too different, being of different zodiac signs, but Kang points out he is from Sagittarius. Patty begs her not to go but falls in love with Kodos. The four of them fly to space, and find themselves on the honeymoon planet, in the cool season, where it is 4,000°F. The episode's title is a parody of the romantic comedy film When Harry Met Sally....

The episode concludes with a collage of clips from previous Treehouse of Horror episodes.

== Reception ==
=== Viewing figures ===
Leading out of an NFL doubleheader, the episode earned a 2.0 rating and a 9 share and was watched by 5.42 million viewers, which was the most viewed show on Fox that night.

=== Critical response ===
The episode was met with mixed reviews by critics.

Dennis Perkins from The A.V. Club gave it an overall grade of B−, and said "The XXXth/666th "Treehouse Of Horror" is just The Simpsons' wheezy annual horror exercise."

Alex from Frightday was less impressed, saying "It’s hard to criticize a late series Simpsons episode without sounding like an old man yelling at a cloud, but this installment was a big letdown."

Tony Sokol from Den of Geek gave it 4.5 out of 5 stars and said "The Simpsons‘ Halloween treats are consistently among any season’s highlights, even if they usually have one segment which isn’t as good as the others in the episode. All three 'Treehouse of Horrors XXX' stories are equally funny, though the best is the short homage to The Omen opener."
