= I Voted for Kodos =

US musical group

- Also known as: IV4K
- Origin: Madison, Wisconsin, United States
- Genres: Ska punk, pop punk, rock
- Years active: 1999–2007, 2013–2014
- Labels: Snapdragon Records (US); Kick Rock Music (Japan)
- Spinoffs: The Faster We Fall, Firefight
- Past members: Rick Bisenius; Lee Gordon; Tyler Christensen; Chris Holoyda; Ross Gilliland; Troy Riechenberger; Nick Rydell; Andy Anderson
- Website: IV4K.com as seen in December 2007

I Voted for Kodos (often abbreviated IV4K) was an American ska punk and pop punk band, signed to Snapdragon Records.

== History ==
The band was founded in Madison, Wisconsin, in 1999, after the singer-trombonist Rick Bisenius met the guitarist Chris Holdoya at a Reel Big Fish concert. They began playing together when they were in high school and college. The band's name comes from The Simpsons episode "Treehouse of Horror VII", in which Homer Simpson says "Don't blame me — I voted for Kodos." Although known for their tongue-in-cheek material (they have noted that celery is the band's official vegetable), their song lyrics have also tackled serious issues such as murder and teenage depression. Their first album, Close Enough for Ska, is considered the success story of a small independent record label, Close to Nothing, which was founded by three teenagers. The band later signed with Snapdragon Records from Milwaukee and released My New Obsession. Snapdragon Records later re-released all IV4K albums and a "compilation of unreleased and best of" songs.

The band members began shows with informal instruction on how to skank so that the audience would appreciate the style of dance associated with ska music. They toured nationally from 2003-2006, and were placed number 7 in PureVolume's top ten unsigned bands in the US. The band played the 2004–2006 Vans Warped Tours, and the music critic Joe Lynch described their 2006 performance as "freewheeling and energetic". During a separate national tour in early 2006, one music journalist wrote that the band "uses a hot horn section, plenty of guitar and on-the-mark lyrics to fuel a high-energy show."

The band stopped working together in 2007, although Bisenius and Holdoya continued to collaborate on a new band, Firefight, and Bisenius began a solo project, The Faster We Fall.

On Nov. 30th 2013, the band played in Madison, WI and released a 7" called "Dear Chris Demakes, I'm Also Never Going Back to New Jersey." I Voted for Kodos had a successfully funded Kickstarter on July 31, 2014, to record an E.P. called "Start Your Own Scene." Also in 2014, the band played shows in New York and Madison, WI.

== Line-up ==
- Rick Bisenius (1999–2007) – lead vocals, trombone, alto saxophone (2005, 2013), tenor saxophone (2000), Moog, piano
- Lee Gordon (1999-2007) – mellophone, backing vocals, rhythm guitar, French horn (2003–2007), synthesizer
- Nick Rydell (1999–2004, 2007) – alto saxophone, tenor saxophone (2003–2004)
- Tyler Christensen (2004–2007) – lead guitar, backing vocals
- Chris Holoyda (1999–2004, 2007) – lead guitar, synthesizer
- Ross Gilliland (1999–2005, 2007) – bass guitar, upright bass
- Troy Riechenberger (2004–2005, 2007) – drums

=== Past members ===
- Dave Bartov (2000–2003) – trumpet
- Tom Kaboski (2000–2003) – tenor saxophone
- Andrew "Dafe" Fenton (2000–2004) – lead guitar
- Calum Lugton (2004–2006) – lead guitar, alto saxophone, backing vocals
- Mo Olig (2004–2005) – bass guitar
- Seamus Arena (2005–2006) – bass guitar
- Michael Pulling (2006–2007) – bass guitar, keyboards, theremin, Mellotron
- Andrew Anderson (1999–2003) – keyboards, piano, trumpet
- Paul Reinke (1999–2004) – drums
- David Gage (2005–2006) – drums

=== Touring members ===
- Brian Lee (1999) – alto saxophone
- Aaron Joneson (2000) – tenor saxophone
- Tim Ford (2000–2001) – drums
- Keith Cronin (2001–2002) – bass guitar
- Dustin Frost (2004) – trombone
- Andy Christoffersen (2004) – drums
- Adam Dettwiler (2004) – bass guitar
- Jim Bower (2005) – trombone
- Rick Reichenberger (2005) – bass guitar, keyboards
- Jeremy Braband (2005–2006) – bass guitar
- Tim Lappin (2006) – bass guitar
- Devin Munson (2005) – drums
- JT Turret (2005–2006) – keyboards
- Andrew Singer (2006) – bass guitar

== Discography ==
=== Albums ===
- 2000: Close Enough For Ska (Close to Nothing. Re-released on Snapdragon Records 2008)
- 2006: My New Obsession (Snapdragon Records)

=== EPs ===
- 2003: Not Penis Cream (Classic Filth. Re-released on Snapdragon Records 2008)
- 2013: Dear Chris Demakes, I'm Also Never Going Back to New Jersey
- 2014: Start Your Own Scene

=== Compilations ===
- 2000: Wiskansin: Skankin' Til the Cows Come Home (Trapdoor Records)
- 2003: Kicked Squat in the Nuts (Danger Zone Records)
- 2006: Best of Minnesota Punk & Ska Compilation
- 2007: If You Can't Make It Big.....Just Give Up! (Snapdragon Records)
