= Close Enough for Ska =

Studio album by I Voted for Kodos
- Released: December 1, 2000
- Genre: Ska punk
- Length: 45:22
- Label: Close To Nothing

I Voted for Kodos chronology
Close Enough for Ska (2000)	Not Penis Cream (2003)

Close Enough for Ska is the first full-length release by I Voted for Kodos.

The title refers to a phrase the band typically used while they were tuning up before shows: "We can never quite get in tune or do the songs completely right every time so we often end up saying that the sound isn't perfect but that's close enough for ska," drummer Paul Renke said in an interview. This itself is a reference to the well-known phrase "close enough for jazz."

== Track listing ==
All songs were written by Chris Holoyda and Rick Bisenius.

1. "Just Want You to Know"
2. "You Never Asked Me To"
3. "Todd"
4. "Going Down"
5. "She Hates Ska"
6. "Calc Lecture Girl"
7. "Shallow Grave"
8. "http://www.dumped.com"
9. "What Happens Next?"
10. "Wish I Was Aaron"
11. "Gunpoint"

== Credits ==
- Rick Bisenius - lead vocals, trombone, tenor sax
- Chris Holoyda - guitar, synth
- Lee Gordon – mellophone, backing vocals, guitar
- Nick Rydell - alto sax
- Andrew Anderson - piano, organ, trumpet
- Ross Gilliland - bass
- Paul Reinke - drums
