= My New Obsession =

Studio album by I Voted for Kodos
- Released: July 11, 2006
- Genre: Ska punk
- Length: 34:58
- Label: Snapdragon

I Voted for Kodos chronology
Not Penis Cream (2003)	My New Obsession (2006)	If You Can't Make It Big.....Just Give Up! (2007)

My New Obsession is the second full-length release by I Voted for Kodos. Unlike the previous album, My New Obsession focused less on ska, and branched to other genres such as pop punk and rock. This effectively alienated them from their entire fanbase, quickly leading to the band's demise.

The album was rated 1.5 out of 5 stars by PunkNews.org.

== Track listing ==
1. "Turn The Radio On"
2. "Never Go Home"
3. "Friday Night Lights Out"
4. "These Scars Won't Heal Themselves"
5. "Radio Love Song"
6. "Please Die In A Fire"
7. "You're My Favorite "
8. "Wishful Thinking In Fourth Period"
9. "Sherrie's Song"
10. "Three Day's 'til Rome"
11. "Perfecting The Art Of Persuasion"

The band also released a Japanese version of the album with three additional songs:

1. "Turn It Up"
2. "Good Riddance"
3. "I Won’t Be Home For Christmas"

== Credits ==
- Rick Bisenius - lead vocals, moog, piano, trombone, alto sax
- Lee Gordon – guitar, mellophone, backing vocals
- Tyler Christensen – guitar, backing vocals
- Ross Gilliland - bass
- Troy Riechenberger – drums
