= The Little People (The Twilight Zone) =

- The Twilight Zone episode
- Episode no.: Season 3 Episode 28
- Directed by: William F. Claxton
- Written by: Rod Serling
- Production code: 4822
- Original air date: March 30, 1962

Guest appearances
- Joe Maross: Peter Craig; Claude Akins: William Fletcher; Michael Ford: Spaceman #1; Robert Eaton: Spaceman #2

Episode chronology
← Previous "Person or Persons Unknown"	Next → "Four O'Clock"
- The Twilight Zone (1959 TV series) (season 3)

"The Little People" is episode 93 of the American television anthology series The Twilight Zone. It originally aired on March 30, 1962 on CBS.

== Opening narration ==
The time is the space age, the place is a barren landscape of a rock-walled canyon that lies millions of miles from the planet Earth. The cast of characters? You've met them: William Fletcher, commander of the spaceship; his copilot, Peter Craig. The other characters who inhabit this place you may never see, but they're there, as these two gentlemen will soon find out. Because they're about to partake in a little exploration into that gray, shaded area in space and time that's known as the Twilight Zone.

== Plot ==
Astronauts William Fletcher, the can-do captain, and Peter Craig, the malcontent co-pilot, set down in a canyon on an alien planet to repair their ship. While arguing, Fletcher asks Craig what he would want if he had things his way, and Craig responds that he'd like to be the one giving the orders. Shortly after, Craig hears a sound, though Fletcher does not.

Craig goes scouting over a period of days, leaving Fletcher to repair the ship. One day Craig returns, strutting a bit, and Fletcher asks why he does not seem to have drunk any water in the past 24 hours. Fletcher discovers that Craig has found water. Pressed, Craig reveals that he found a city populated by people no bigger than ants, and takes Fletcher to see them, revealing that he used mathematics to communicate with them. He says he loves having an entire population terrified of him, and refers to himself as a god. Craig begins terrorizing the population by crushing three of their buildings. Fletcher knocks him out and apologizes to the tiny folk.

Later, Fletcher finds that Craig had coerced the tiny people to build a life-size statue of him. He tells Craig that the repairs are done and they can depart. Craig pulls a gun on him and orders him to leave the planet without him. Fletcher does his best to talk Craig into coming along, telling him he'll be lonely, but Craig fires at the statue, blowing off the head, and again orders him to leave. Fletcher leaves in disgust. Craig gloats and throws the broken-off head of the statue at the city, cackling maniacally as tiny voices cry out in panic and tiny sirens wail.

Another ship lands and two spacemen, taller than the mountains, emerge. They too are repairing their ship. Craig shouts at them to go away, claiming, "Don't you understand?! I am the god! I am the god, don't you understand?! I am the god!" One of them notices and picks Craig up to examine him, unintentionally crushing him to death. He casually discards the body and the two giant spacemen leave. The little people rejoice at his death, pulling the statue of Craig down on top of his lifeless body.

== Closing narration ==
The case of navigator Peter Craig, a victim of a delusion. In this case, the dream dies a little harder than the man. A small exercise in space psychology that you can try on for size - in the Twilight Zone.

== Production ==
In an interview with Twilight Zone historian Marc Zicree, series producer Buck Houghton discussed the final scene in which the giant astronauts appear and stand towering behind the mountains in the foreground. He explained that this was an optically composited matte shot which combined new footage of the two actors playing the "giants" with stock location footage of the real mountains around Death Valley, which had originally been filmed two years earlier for the Season 1 episode "I Shot an Arrow into the Air".

Like many other installments of Twilight Zone episodes, this episode used several props and costumes originally created for MGM's Forbidden Planet. In this case, the sidearms worn by the two Earth astronauts are two of the Forbidden Planet "blaster pistols", and the two "giants" who appear in the final scene are wearing C-57D crew tunics (with different belts).

One particularly unusual item is seen during Act I, when Claude Akins' character is shown working on a device he evidently has taken out of the rocket for repair. The design, level of detail and standard of workmanship is highly suggestive of classic-era MGM props department manufacture, and it does bear some resemblance to other items originally crafted for Forbidden Planet. The hyperbolic plexiglass cover Akins removes at the beginning of the scene is very similar in shape to the conical dome on the head of Robby the Robot although it is considerably smaller. This cover protects a small "radar dish" device which is mounted on gimbals (and was probably motor-driven). This prop's general appearance – the frontal "radome", plexiglass "windows" and a small insignia visible on the side – suggests that it may have been built as the nose-cone of some large-scale miniature prop – possibly a futuristic aircraft or spaceship? - although its provenance and what it was originally built for is currently unknown.

In Dennis Etchison's Twilight Zone Radio Dramas adaptation starring Daniel J. Travanti as Fletcher, the name of the "Craig" character was changed to "Knopf" and the character of a talking ship's computer with a female personality was added.

== Legacy ==
The American television series The Simpsons paid homage to "The Little People" in the episode "Treehouse of Horror VII", parodying it in the segment "The Genesis Tub". The segment sees Lisa Simpson putting one of her baby teeth in a petri dish of cola for a school science project, but, thanks to the interference of her brother Bart, causes the creation of a society of microscopic beings living within the tooth, who see Lisa as God, while they see Bart as the Devil for destroying part of their ecosystem with his finger. The segment's inspiration from "The Little People" is further referenced in the animated series South Park, in the episode "Simpsons Already Did It".
