= Treehouse of Horror (The Simpsons episode) =

- The Simpsons episode
- Bart and Lisa telling Halloween stories in their treehouse with Maggie. This is the only episode of the Treehouse of Horror series to actually take place in the treehouse.
- Episode no.: Season 2 Episode 3
- Directed by: Wes Archer ^{BDH}; Rich Moore ^{HATD}; David Silverman ^{TR}
- Written by: John Swartzwelder ^{BDH}; Jay Kogen ^{HATD}; Wallace Wolodarsky ^{HATD}; Edgar Allan Poe ^{TR}; Sam Simon ^{TR}
- Production code: 7F04
- Original air date: October 25, 1990

Guest appearances
- James Earl Jones as the mover, Serak the Preparer and the Narrator of "The Raven"

Episode features
- Commentary: Matt Groening; James L. Brooks; David Silverman; Al Jean; Mike Reiss; Jay Kogen; Wallace Wolodarsky

Episode chronology
← Previous "Simpson and Delilah"	Next → "Two Cars in Every Garage and Three Eyes on Every Fish"
- The Simpsons season 2

"Treehouse of Horror", or "The Simpsons' Treehouse of Horror" (originally aired as "The Simpsons Halloween Special"), is the third episode of the second season of the American animated television series The Simpsons. It originally aired on Fox in the United States on October 25, 1990. The episode was inspired by 1950s horror comics, and begins with a disclaimer that it may be too scary for children. It is considered the first in what would become the annual Treehouse of Horror episodes. These episodes do not obey the show's rule of realism and are not treated as canon. The opening disclaimer and a panning shot through a cemetery with humorous tombstones were features that were used sporadically in the Treehouse of Horror series and eventually dropped. This is also the first episode to have the music composed by Alf Clausen.

The plot revolves around three scary stories told by the Simpson children in the family's treehouse. The first segment involves a haunted house that is based on various haunted house films, primarily The Amityville Horror (1979) and Poltergeist (1982). In the second segment, Kang and Kodos are introduced when the Simpsons are abducted by aliens in a story with similarities to the Twilight Zone episode "To Serve Man". The third segment is an adaptation of Edgar Allan Poe's 1845 poem "The Raven". James Earl Jones guest starred in all three segments. The episode was received positively, being included in several critics' "best of" lists. Critics singled out The Raven for praise, although Simpsons creator Matt Groening was concerned that it would be seen as pretentious.

== Plot ==
On Halloween, Bart, Lisa and Maggie sit in the treehouse and tell scary stories. Homer, who had just come home from trick or treating, eavesdrops on them.

"Bad Dream House" (told by Bart)

The Simpsons move into an eighteen bedroom house they got a good deal on. The walls of the cursed house begin to bleed and objects begin to fly through the air, Lisa senses an evil presence in the house, judging by the ghostly, echoing voice that tells the family to get out. There is also a portal to another dimension, a vortex, in the kitchen: Homer tests it out by throwing an orange in it. A piece of paper is thrown back at him as a response, on which "Quit throwing your garbage into our dimension" is written.

Marge expresses the desire to leave, but Homer asks her to sleep on it. That night, the house possesses Homer and the children, manipulating their minds and making them chase each other with axes and knives. Unlike the others however, Marge is using her knife to spread mayonnaise on a sandwich and intervenes, breaking the trance. Afterwards, Lisa discovers the source of the haunting — a Native American burial ground hidden in the basement. After the house threatens them again, Marge confronts the house, demanding that it treat them with respect during their stay. The house thinks it over and opts to destroy itself rather than live with the Simpsons.

"Hungry Are the Damned" (told by Bart)

The Simpsons are abducted from their backyard by two aliens named Kang and Kodos. The aliens take the Simpsons to their home planet Rigel IV for a feast. En route they present the Simpsons with enormous amounts of food and watch eagerly as the Simpsons gorge themselves.

Suspicious of the aliens' intentions, Lisa finds a book in the kitchen apparently titled How to Cook Humans. Kang blows off space dust partially obscuring the title, now revealed to be How To Cook for Humans. Lisa then blows off more dust, showing the title as How To Cook Forty Humans. Kang blows off some more dust, finally revealing that the book's title is in fact How To Cook for Forty Humans. Enraged at Lisa's mistrust, the aliens return the Simpsons to Earth, rebuking the family for ruining their chance at paradise on the planet.

"The Raven" (read by Lisa)

In this adaptation of Edgar Allan Poe's "The Raven", Bart is depicted as the raven, Homer appears as the poem's narrator, and Marge appears in a portrait as Lenore. The Narrator, infuriated by the Raven's mockery of his grief over his lost Lenore, flies into a fit of rage chasing it across his study, ending with the Raven's eventual victory and the Narrator staring helplessly at it as he sits on the floor amid a scatter of books and broken objects.

Back at the treehouse, Bart, Lisa and Maggie find they are not frightened by any of the stories, considering them to be tame by today's standards. They climb down the treehouse and sleep peacefully, while Homer lies awake in bed, terrified of the stories. As he lies in bed, Homer notices the Bart raven outside their bedroom window, and he hides beneath his blankets, murmuring that he hates Halloween.

== Production ==
Unlike a typical The Simpsons episode, "Treehouse of Horror" is divided into three segments. It is the first in the Treehouse of Horror series of Halloween themed The Simpsons episodes. It is considered to be non-canon and takes place outside the normal continuity of the show. A Treehouse of Horror episode has since aired around Halloween every season. Part of the series' attraction for the writers is that they are able to break the rules and include violence that would not make it into a regular episode. The episode was inspired by EC Comics horror comics, such as Tales from the Crypt. In the first segment, several haunted house films are parodied, including House of Usher, The Haunting, The Amityville Horror and The Shining. The haunted house being built on a burial ground is inspired by the 1982 film Poltergeist (despite there being no burial ground in the film). The house was also designed to look like the Addams family house. The second segment's cookbook is a reference to the 1962 The Twilight Zone episode "To Serve Man". The third segment reimagines Edgar Allan Poe's 1845 narrative poem "The Raven".

In 2011, staff writer Al Jean commented on the episode: "The idea of it to parody EC Comics was really original and kind of shocking for a cartoon on network television. [Executive producer] Jim Brooks said, 'We better have a disclaimer at the beginning of this Halloween show,' so Marge came out and warned people that they were going to see something scary. And the funny thing is it's now very tame by our Halloween standards and by network animation standards". According to M. Keith Booker, author of Drawn to Television, the warning only made the episode more attractive to children. The entire segment was a parody of the opening of the 1931 film Frankenstein. While similar "warnings" were used to open "Treehouse of Horror II" and "Treehouse of Horror III", these quickly became a burden to write and there was no warning for "Treehouse of Horror IV". Instead, it had Marge ask Bart to warn people how frightening the show was during his introduction paying homage to Night Gallery. The tradition was revived for "Treehouse of Horror V"; after that, they were permanently dropped and the writers did not make any attempts at reviving them. In the opening segment of the episode, and the four subsequent episodes, the camera zooms through a cemetery where tombstones with humorous epitaphs can be seen. These messages include the names of canceled shows from the previous television season and celebrities such as Walt Disney and Jim Morrison. They were last used in "Treehouse of Horror V", which included a solitary tombstone with the words "Amusing Tombstones" to signal this. The tombstone gags were easy for the writers in the first episode, but like Marge's warnings, they eventually got more difficult to write, so they were abandoned. Of the series, "Treehouse of Horror" was the only one that included a treehouse as a setting. "Treehouse of Horror" was the first time an alternate version of the theme that airs over the end credits was used. Originally it was supposed to use a theremin (an early electronic musical instrument), but one could not be found that could hit all the necessary notes.

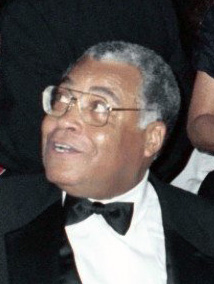
James Earl Jones voices minor characters and narrates "The Raven".

Alf Clausen, who has scored most of the Simpsons music, began his work on the show with this episode. "Bad Dream House", the first segment, was written by John Swartzwelder and directed by Wes Archer. The voice of the house was provided by cast member Harry Shearer. Jay Kogen and Wallace Wolodarsky wrote "Hungry are the Damned", the second segment, and Rich Moore directed it. Sam Simon wrote "The Raven", the third segment, and David Silverman directed it. The segment was based on Allan Poe's "The Raven". During production, The Simpsons creator Matt Groening was nervous about "The Raven" because it did not have many gags and felt it would be "the worst, most pretentious thing [they had] ever done" on the show. American actor James Earl Jones guest starred in the episode as a moving man, Serak the Preparer (one of the aliens) and the narrator of "The Raven". Unable to work with the rest of the cast, Jones recorded his lines at the Village Recorder in West Los Angeles; he chewed on a cookie close to his microphone to perform drooling sounds for the aliens.

The sibling aliens Kang and Kodos first appeared on the show on this episode. Every Treehouse of Horror episode since this one must have Kang and Kodos as characters, states an unofficial The Simpsons rule. Despite this rule, the writers say the duo will often be forgotten and then added at the last second, leading to brief appearances. The idea of Kang and Kodos came from Kogen and Wolodarsky. In the script, Kang and Kodos were shown as "an octopus in a space helmet with a trail of goo". The finished design was based on the cover of an EC Comics issue. Although originally designed to constantly drool, Groening suggested that they not drool all the time to make the animation process easier. However, the animators did not mind the work, leading to the drooling staying in the script. Kang and Kodos's names are derived from two Star Trek: The Original Series characters: Kang was a Klingon captain portrayed by actor Michael Ansara in the episode "Day of the Dove", whereas Kodos the Executioner was a human villain from "The Conscience of the King". Harry Shearer voices Kang and Dan Castellaneta voices Kodos. A third alien named Serak the Preparer also made its first and only appearance in the series.

== Reception ==
In its original broadcast, "Treehouse of Horror" finished 25th in ratings for the week of October 22–28, 1990, with a Nielsen rating of 15.7, equivalent to approximately 14.6 million viewing households. It was the highest-rated show on Fox that week, beating Married... with Children.

Since airing, the episode has received mostly positive reviews from television critics. In 1998, TV Guide listed it in its list of top twelve Simpsons episodes. The Guardian named it one of the five greatest episodes in Simpsons history. The authors of the book I Can't Believe It's a Bigger and Better Updated Unofficial Simpsons Guide, Gary Russell and Gareth Roberts, said the first two segments worked better than the third, "but this is a marvelous episode, and set a high standard for the Halloween specials to come". In 2008, Canwest News Service chose "Treehouse of Horror" as one of the top five scariest episodes from television's past. They singled out Marge saying "This family has had its differences and we've squabbled, but we've never had knife fights before, and I blame this house" as a memorable line from the episode. Two of the episode's segments were singled out by critics as exemplary parts of the Treehouse of Horror series. "The Raven" was selected as the second best Treehouse of Horror segment by Ryan J. Budke of TV Squad in 2005. Budke described the segment as "one of the most refined Simpsons pop references ever" and knows "people [who] consider this the point that they realized The Simpsons could be both highly hilarious and highly intelligent". "Hungry are the Damned" was selected as the fifth best Treehouse of Horror segment by Eric Goldman, Dan Iverson and Brian Zoromski of IGN in 2008. The IGN reviewers singled out the How to Cook for Forty Humans section of the segment as its funniest moment.

Critics also praised the episode's relationship to various television shows and Poe's "The Raven". Michael Stailey of DVD Verdict described the three Treehouse of Horror segments as "brilliantly crafted tales capturing the best elements of The Twilight Zone, Outer Limits, and Alfred Hitchcock Presents, injecting them into the Simpsons' universe". DVD reviewer Doug Pratt described "The Raven" as a "perfect adaptation". Kurt M. Koenigsberger said in his book Leaving Springfield that The Simpsons, while "not strictly a literary form ... is certainly the most literate of all situation comedies". Koenigsberger uses "The Raven" as one example in support of the statement "The Simpsons is steeped in the American literary context into which Arnold Bennett made such a splash on his tour in 1911."

== In popular media ==
A clip from the "Hungry are the Damned" segment is shown on a TV in a hotel room in Gus Van Sant's 1991 film My Own Private Idaho.
