= Treehouse of Horror XIII =

- The Simpsons episode
- Promotional artwork for the episode showing the family as animals in the third segment.
- Episode no.: Season 14; Episode 1
- Directed by: David Silverman
- Written by: "Send in the Clones": Marc Wilmore; "The Fright to Creep and Scare Harms": Brian Kelley; "The Island of Dr. Hibbert": Kevin Curran
- Production code: DABF19
- Original air date: November 3, 2002

Episode features
- Commentary: Al Jean; Brian Kelley; Kevin Curran; Matt Selman; John Frink; Dan Castellaneta; Yeardley Smith; David Silverman

Episode chronology
← Previous "Poppa's Got a Brand New Badge"	Next → "How I Spent My Strummer Vacation"
- The Simpsons season 14

"Treehouse of Horror XIII" (titled onscreen as "The Simpsons Treehouse of Horror 13") is the first episode of the fourteenth season of the American animated television series The Simpsons, and the thirteenth Treehouse of Horror episode. It first aired on the Fox network in the United States on November 3, 2002, three days after Halloween. It is the second Halloween episode to have a zombie related segment, and the last Halloween to have three separate writers credited for writing three stories until "Treehouse of Horror XXXIII". It is also the first Halloween episode to be titled Treehouse of Horror in the opening credits, as all prior Halloween episodes were referred to as The Simpsons Halloween Special. It is the first of these episodes not to have a Roman numeral used in its opening title.

In the episode, Homer buys a magic hammock that can create duplicates of anyone who lies in it in "Send in the Clones"; Lisa's call to end gun violence resurrects undead outlaws in "The Fright to Creep and Scare Harms"; and Dr. Hibbert invites everyone in Springfield to his island resort where everyone is turned into half-man, half-animal hybrids in "The Island of Dr. Hibbert".

== Plot ==
The Simpson family and Ned Flanders hold a séance in the hope of communicating with the spirit of Maude Flanders. Bart tries to trick Ned by dressing up as Maude's ghost, but the real ghost of Maude, now a demonic spirit, appears instead. She asks if they're ready for tales that will shatter spines and boil blood, to which Lisa replies as "well, duh." Maude's demonic ghost then pulls out a book that reads the episode's title.

=== "Send in the Clones" ===
In this spoof of Multiplicity, Homer's hammock collapses while he is taking a nap. He purchases a new one from a passing vendor, who warns him that it carries a curse. Disregarding this, Homer lies down and discovers that the new hammock can produce clones of anyone who rests on it. He inspects the first clone and notices that it does not have a belly button.

He makes clones to do all of his chores, which include fixing a light fitting (resulting in the first clone being electrocuted to death and Homer creating a new clone to help dispose of the body), helping Marge choose an outfit, visiting Grampa, and play baseball with Bart, Lisa and Maggie. He also discovers that the clones are becoming increasingly less intelligent. When one clone kills Ned Flanders by decapitating him with his chainsaw, Homer decides to get rid of the clones and the hammock. He bundles the clones in a truck and takes them to an isolated cornfield, where he abandons them (killing any who knew the way back), along with the hammock.

The clones use the abandoned hammock to make an army of Homer clones, which wreak havoc in Springfield. US army officials gather in the Mayor's War Room and determine that the clones will eat up America by the next day. In an attempt to stop the clones from overpopulating America, the government tricks them into falling off a cliff at Springfield Gorge (Note: a callback to "Bart the Daredevil") by trailing giant donuts from helicopters as bait. The plan is a success, and the clones tumble into the gorge in pursuit of the donuts. That evening, Marge is shocked to find that the Homer in bed with her is actually a slightly more intelligent and considerate clone who was not tempted by the donuts; he remarks that the real Homer was the first to be jump off the cliff with the other clones. Marge is distressed by the real Homer's death until the clone Homer soothes her with a backrub.

=== "The Fright to Creep and Scare Harms" ===
While at the Springfield Cemetery mourning the loss of her pet goldfish, Lisa inadvertently discovers the grave of William H. Bonney, a man who was killed in his youth by gun violence. According to his epitaph, he "dream[ed] of a world without guns." In his memory, Lisa starts a gun control crusade, which makes Springfield 100% gun-free; even the police no longer possess guns. The town is now defenseless, causing the corpses of Bonney, in reality notorious outlaw Billy the Kid, and his "Hole-in-the-Ground" gang — Frank and Jesse James, the Sundance Kid, and Kaiser Wilhelm II — to rise from the dead. The gang wreaks havoc on the town until Professor Frink invents a time machine, which Homer uses to go back in time to stop the gun ban and destroy the zombies. Homer tells the citizens of Springfield to shoot at the zombies' graves, causing them to rise up and flee. Lisa feels guilty about banning guns, concluding that sometimes they are the answer. A futuristic Homer suddenly appears to warn them about guns that have destroyed Earth in the future, only to be shot by Moe, who is fed up with all the contradictory messages. Moe then commandeers Frink's time machine to find some "caveman hookers".

=== "The Island of Dr. Hibbert" ===
In this parody of The Island of Doctor Moreau, the Simpsons visit "The Island of Lost Souls," where they find Dr. Hibbert running the island's resort after hearing rumors he has gone mad. The family has dinner with Professor Frink, who is transformed into a turkey as the main course. When Marge explores the island, she is captured by Hibbert, who transforms her into a blue panther. She returns to her room and has violent, animal sex with Homer, who belatedly realizes that she has been mutated.

Homer treks across the island looking for a cure to Marge's condition, but encounters Ned Flanders, who is now a cow-human hybrid in need of a milking. After Homer reluctantly milks him, Ned takes him to meet other Springfield inhabitants who have also been turned into mutant animals, including Bart (now a spider), Lisa (now an eagle) and Maggie (now an anteater, who is nearly eaten by Lisa until Homer intervenes). Homer, initially appalled at what everyone has become, eventually embraces the concept of being a mutant animal upon realizing how well it fits in with his personal lifestyle. The segment ends with a mutated Homer in the form of a walrus and the rest of the Simpsons and Springfield mutants lounging aside the resort's pool, intending Hibbert's resort where to live out their lives.

=== Ending ===
The episode concludes with an appearance by Kang and Kodos, observing that Hibbert's skull-shaped island resembles their alien number 4.

== Production ==
This is the first Treehouse of Horror special to be called "Treehouse of Horror" instead of "The Simpsons Halloween Special" in the opening or title sequence.

This is also the first "Treehouse of Horror" episode to use the digital ink and paint as a proof of concept, and the fourth episode overall to be done in the process following "Radioactive Man", "The Simpsons 138th Episode Spectacular", and "Tennis the Menace", which led to the decision to have the show's animation converted from traditional cel to digital ink and paint. It was a good episode to test the technique on due to the cloning sequences which required many different layers of animation for each of the clones. The series fully converted to digital animation a few episodes later, starting with "The Great Louse Detective".

According to Al Jean, in the dub for the scene where Homer is being cloned, Matt Groening said "let's just throw a couple screams in there", and sound archive locator Norm supplied them. The effect coming out of the hammock is meant to resemble a Xerox light. This was one of two years that did not feature special Halloween names of The Simpsons staff in the credits. Al Jean said that to some people, the names took up so much space across the screen that the result was a "green smear". They were brought back due to popular demand. The image of Homer strangling Homer was pitched in the writers' room by one of the audio commentators.

Because Nancy Kruse served as assistant director in this episode, director David Silverman was granted enough time to do his own animated sequences for the episode - including a Grandpa scene and a Frink scene. It was one of the last episodes in which he both directed and animated. The scene where the Homer clones fall into the gorge was supposed to be a reference to a similar event in season two episode "Bart the Daredevil", but the idea was dropped due to time constraints. In preparation for the song sequence, David Silverman spoke to show composer Alf Clausen to write music for the team to animate ahead of time, to ensure the timing of the build-up and the song itself was working. Kevin Curran watched all the different film versions of The Island of Doctor Moreau before making his segment. The scene where the eyes eat the other eyes in the third segment was pitched by David Mirkin after the table read. After realizing they had to populate the island with characters, the team hurriedly drew up many new designs for the animal-equivalents (based on similar features the character had to an animal) and sent them off to get animated. Kang and Kodos were not originally in this episode, but they were later added in to keep with the tradition of including them, whether a whole segment or a small cameo devoted to them.

== Cultural references ==
The segment titles are based on the 1973 song "Send in the Clowns", the right to keep and bear arms, and H. G. Wells's 1896 novel The Island of Doctor Moreau.

The A.V. Club notes, "The episode begins with an attempt to summon the spirit of Maude Flanders, who was bumped off in [a] previous season's highly publicized 'Alone Again, Natura-Diddily'." The site also says "The locust-like swarm created in the segment ['Send in the Clones'] owes as much to the Michael Keaton vehicle Multiplicity as any real-world cloning concerns".

In the crowd of clones in "Send in the Clones", Peter Griffin from Family Guy, a Homer with glasses and a Homer drawn in the same design as he had appeared on The Tracey Ullman Show in 1987 appear alongside normal Homers; with the Ullman-esque Homer even proclaiming "Let's all go out for some frosty chocolate milkshakes!" In regard to Peter Griffin's appearance, Skwigly says this is "a sly dig at the likeness of the two characters". The Simpsons staff noted that it was a joke at how Family Guy was a clone of their show. There was originally going to be a second joke involving Family Guy, but as the show had recently been cancelled, the staff of The Simpsons didn't want to "kick 'em when they're down", so they cut it. Family Guy would turn the tables during the opening of their episode "PTV", where Homer makes an appearance similar to The Simpsons intro sequence. In that episode's commentary, Family Guy creator Seth MacFarlane confirmed that Homer's appearance was in response to Peter's appearance in this episode.

During the war room scene when the general displays how fast the clones spread throughout the country, icons of Homer initially begin sprouting up at real Springfield locations. This is most likely a tongue-in-cheek at the long running joke of what state the town is actually in.

Billy the Kid, Jesse James, and Kaiser Wilhelm II appear as the zombies in the segment "The Fright To Creep And Scare Harms". At one point in the writing process, John Lennon was also part of the gang. Ride of the Valkyries, Apocalypse Now, and Dr. Strangelove (the war room scene) are referenced. Bart as a spider spells out the phrase "Eat my shorts!" in his spider web from Charlotte's Web.

The chorus from Stephen Stills's 1970 popular song "Love the One You're With" is played at the end of "Send in the Clones" after Marge discovers the original Homer is dead and she is with a clone, but decides she is happy with the clone. The chorus contains the lyrics, "If you can't be with the one you love / Honey, love the one you're with."

While riding the Flanders-cow hybrid, Homer sings "In the jungle, the creepy jungle, Homer rides a freak". It is a reference to the Tokens' 1961 song "The Lion Sleeps Tonight", notably featured in The Lion King (1994).

== Critical reception ==
"Treehouse of Horror XIII" has met with mostly positive reviews. On IMDb, the episode has a rating of 7.6/10 from around 2500 users.

"Send in the Clones" and "The Fright To Creep and Scare Harms" were listed as #8 and #9 respectively in The A.V. Club article, 'You said we'd be greeted as liberators!': 10 anxiety-reflecting Simpsons Halloween segments. It said "Season 14's "Treehouse Of Horror" is steeped in timely concerns, ripping inspiration from the headlines", noting that "Send In The Clones", in which Homer clones himself, "followed the U.S. Congress' second failed attempt to pass a comprehensive ban on reproductive human cloning." The A.V. Club also noted that The Simpsons reveled in zombie tales (in season four's Pet Sematary/Night Of The Living Dead hybrid, "Dial 'Z' For Zombies," and "The Fright To Creep And Scare Harms" from season 14") many years before it became the vogue again with "Walking Dead-mania".

"The Island of Dr. Hibbert" appeared in a list of 11 most disturbing Treehouse of Horror segments from The Simpsons by Blastr. The site noted: "The effect is as oddball as a convention hall full of Simpsons-cosplaying furries. Dr. Frink's turkey death scene is rivalled only by the creepy scene where Homer has to milk cow-centaur Flanders."
