= A Small Talent for War =

- The Twilight Zone segment
- Scene from "A Small Talent for War"
- Episode no.: Season 1 Episode 15b
- Directed by: Claudia Weill
- Written by: Alan Brennert; Carter Scholz
- Original air date: January 24, 1986

Guest appearances
- John Glover as Alien Ambassador; Peter Michael Goetz as American Diplomat; Stefan Gierasch as Soviet Diplomat; Fran Bennett as UN Chairman; Jose Santana as U.S. Aide; Gillian Eaton as British Delegate; Richard Brestoff as British Aide

Episode chronology
← Previous "Monsters!"	Next → "A Matter of Minutes"

"A Small Talent for War" is the second segment of the fifteenth episode of the first season of the television series The Twilight Zone. In this segment, an advanced alien race claims to have created human beings and proposes to wipe them out unless they change their ways.

== Plot ==
The scene is set with the United Nations Security Council bickering between nations over how to respond to the appearance of an extraterrestrial vessel near the council building.

An ambassador from an alien race then appears to them and claims that his race seeded life on Earth millions of years earlier. He tells them that his race is displeased with humanity's "small talent for war," as they have failed to produce the potential that the aliens had nurtured, and his fleet will destroy all life on Earth. The Security Council pleads for and is granted a 24-hour reprieve to prove humanity's worth.

The Security Council and the General Assembly negotiate an accord for lasting global peace and present it to the alien ambassador. He is amused at the peace accord and explains that his race was, in fact, seeking a greater talent for war, as they had genetically seeded thousands of planets to breed warriors to fight for them across the galaxy. They perceived humanity's conflicts as erratic and clumsy, weapons as crude and primitive, and longing for peace as a fatal flaw. As the ambassador calls down his fleet to destroy Earth, he praises the Security Council for the amusing day, commenting that while war is their goal, good humor is an even more difficult talent to master.
