= Treehouse of Horror VII =

- The Simpsons episode
- Episode no.: Season 8 Episode 1
- Directed by: Mike B. Anderson
- Written by: The Thing and I: Ken Keeler; The Genesis Tub: Dan Greaney; Citizen Kang: David X. Cohen
- Production code: 4F02
- Original air date: October 27, 1996

Guest appearance
- Phil Hartman as Bill Clinton

Episode features
- Couch gag: The Grim Reaper is on the couch. The family runs in, but keel over and die one by one. The Reaper then puts his feet up on the corpses of the Simpson family.
- Commentary: Matt Groening; Josh Weinstein; David X. Cohen; Dan Greaney; Ken Keeler; Dan Castellaneta; Mike B. Anderson

Episode chronology
| ← Previous "Summer of 4 Ft. 2" | Next → "You Only Move Twice" |
- The Simpsons season 8

"Treehouse of Horror VII" is the first episode of the eighth season of the American animated television series The Simpsons. It originally aired on the Fox network in the United States on October 27, 1996. In the seventh annual Treehouse of Horror episode, Bart discovers his long-lost twin Hugo, Lisa grows a colony of small beings, and Kang and Kodos impersonate Bill Clinton (voiced by Phil Hartman) and Bob Dole in order to win the 1996 presidential election.

This episode was written by Ken Keeler, Dan Greaney, and David X. Cohen, and directed by Mike B. Anderson. Phil Hartman voiced Clinton and Harry Shearer voiced Dole. This is the first Treehouse of Horror episode to be a season premiere.

== Plot ==
=== Opening ===
In the kitchen, Homer Simpson lights a jack-o'-lantern but ends up lighting his arm on fire. He runs off screaming while the title, "The Simpsons Halloween Special VII" is shown on screen.

=== "The Thing and I" ===
Bart and Lisa hear strange noises coming from the attic. They investigate and discover that there is a monster. Homer and Marge realize that the creature has escaped, prompting Marge to call Dr. Hibbert. He explains that Bart has an evil twin named Hugo. The two were originally conjoined but were separated at birth.

Hugo was deemed too evil to live in society, so they chained him in the attic, where they feed him fish-heads. Bart stays behind as the others leave to search for Hugo, but Bart realizes that Hugo never left the house. Hugo takes Bart to the attic and ties him up, so that he can reattach himself, but Hibbert returns and knocks out Hugo. He then realizes that Hugo's scar is on the wrong side, mostly on the left side of his body, therefore Bart is technically the evil twin. To make amends for their error, Hibbert and the Simpson family sit down to a turkey dinner with Hugo, leaving Bart, who wants some turkey, locked in the attic with only Hugo's fish-heads to eat.

=== "The Genesis Tub" ===
In preparation for the school science fair, Lisa performs an experiment in a petri dish to see if cola will dissolve her baby tooth. Bart gives Lisa a static electric shock, claiming it is part of his project to prove that "nerds conduct electricity". The electric charge is then passed on to the tooth when Lisa tries to touch it, causing it to undergo an unusual reaction which creates a race of miniature beings. Lisa discovers this when inspecting the contents of the tub with a microscope, noting that their rate of evolution is accelerated. Bart destroys some of the ecosystem in Lisa's tub universe with his finger, and the tub people retaliate by sending a squadron of spaceships to attack him. The inhabitants of the tub then shrink Lisa to their size with a miniaturization ray and beam her down into the tub, where they explain that they regard her as God, and Bart as the Devil.

She says she can protect them from Bart if they return her to normal size, but they lack the necessary technology. Suddenly, Bart takes the tub to the science fair to the tub people's horror and submits the tiny universe as his own project, and now Lisa is forced to watch from within as Bart wins first prize. Now stuck in the tub for the rest of her life, Lisa starts to order around the tub people.

=== "Citizen Kang" ===
While out fishing, Homer is abducted by Kang and Kodos. They demand that Homer take them to Earth's leader, but Homer informs them of the 1996 United States presidential election and says the winner could be either Bill Clinton or Bob Dole. Kang and Kodos kidnap both Dole and Clinton and place them in suspended animation, assuming their forms through "bio-duplication" to ensure that one of them will become the next leader. Before returning Homer to Earth, the aliens soak him in rum, so others will dismiss his story as a drunken hallucination.

Most voters seem to be oblivious to the strange behaviors of Kang and Kodos in disguise, much to Homer's vexation. On the day before the election, Homer stumbles upon the badly hidden spaceship, hijacks it and releases Dole and Clinton from suspended animation. Both candidates agree they should put aside their differences and join forces to defeat the aliens and bring about a new age of bipartisanship, but Homer accidentally ejects them into space. Homer crashes the spaceship into the Capitol and unmasks the aliens, revealing the candidates' true identities to the public. However, despite being exposed, Kang and Kodos declare to the people that the two-party system means they still have to choose one of them, mocking a bystander's suggestion of voting for a third-party candidate instead. Kang is subsequently elected President of the United States, ruling as a monarchical tyrant and enslaving the American population in order to build a giant death ray. Marge complains about the work, but Homer remarks, "Don't blame me, I voted for Kodos!"

== Production ==
Like the previous two Treehouse of Horror episodes, "Treehouse of Horror VII" does not feature any wraparound segments. "The Thing and I" was written by Ken Keeler, "The Genesis Tub" was written by Dan Greaney, and "Citizen Kang" was written by David X. Cohen. Despite the similarities, "The Thing and I" was not based on the plot of the 1982 film Basket Case. "The Genesis Tub" was originally pitched by Cohen, and it was later referenced in the South Park episode "Simpsons Already Did It", when they pointed out that The Simpsons had gotten the idea from the 1962 Twilight Zone episode called "The Little People". The sequence where tiny spaceships attack Bart in "The Genesis Tub" marks one of the first uses of computers in The Simpsons animation. The computer was used to build models for reference and the animators later retraced it. The 1996 Presidential election occurred a few days after the airing of this episode. According to Cohen, the "Citizen Kang" short violated every rule of The Simpsons as it locked the episode in one time and named specific candidates.

== Cultural references ==
Homer sings "Fish Heads", a 1978 novelty song by Barnes & Barnes. In "The Genesis Tub", the glowing rings that "debigulate" Lisa were inspired by Metropolis. Lisa's experiment, where a shock of static electricity creates new life from simple ingredients, refers to the Miller-Urey experiment attempting to use electric shocks to simulate early earth abiogenesis. Homer crashing the flying saucer into the Capitol dome in the "Citizen Kang" segment is a reference to Earth vs. the Flying Saucers.

== Reception ==
In its original broadcast, "Treehouse of Horror VII" finished 31st in ratings for the week of October 21–27, 1996, with a Nielsen rating of 10.5, equivalent to approximately 10.2 million viewing households. It was the third highest-rated show on the Fox network that week, following Millennium and The X-Files.

In 2017, IGN called "Citizen Kang" the best segment of the entire anthology, and placed the episode itself as number one in its ranking of all "Treehouse of Horror" episodes. The A.V. Club named Kang/Bob Dole's line, "Abortions for some, miniature American flags for others!", one of the best lines in the history of the show.

The ska punk band named I Voted for Kodos takes its name from Homer's line, "Don't blame me, I voted for Kodos", at the end of "Citizen Kang". In a 2000 Entertainment Weekly article, Matt Groening ranked this episode as his seventh favorite in the history of the show.

Kamala Harris quoted a line from "Citizen Kang" ("We must move forward, not backward; upward, not forward; and always twirling, twirling, twirling towards freedom") for a University of Chicago student scavenger hunt in 2013. A filmed clip of this moment was shown at the Simpsons panel during the 2024 San Diego Comic-Con, at a time when Harris was both the sitting vice president and the presumed Democratic presidential nominee.

Les Chappell notes that the episode is darker than previous Treehouse installments: "'Mature' is the wrong word, but there's definitely an ambition here that hasn't been seen on Halloweens past, and a drive that would endure throughout the series long after the Clinton/Dole contest would fade from memory. As it enters its eighth year, The Simpsons proves it remains a force for comedic innovations, committed to moving forward, not backward; upward, not forward; and always twirling, twirling, twirling towards freedom."
