= Treehouse of Horror Presents: The Revengening =

- The Simpsons episode
- Episode no.: Season 38; Episode 3
- Directed by: Eddie Rosas
- Written by: Nick Dahan
- Production code: 37ABF13
- Original air date: October 18, 2026

Guest appearances
- Gustavo Dudamel as himself; Janina Gavankar as Manjula Nahasapeemapetilon; Sunil Malhotra as Apu Nahasapeemapetilon

Episode chronology
← Previous "Diary of a Chimpy Kid"	Next → "Treehouse of Horror XXXVII"
- The Simpsons season 38

"Treehouse of Horror Presents: The Revengening" is the third episode of the thirty-eighth season of the American animated television series The Simpsons, and the 812th episode overall. The episode aired on the Fox network in the United States on October 18, 2026. The episode was written by Nick Dahan and directed by Eddie Rosas.

The episode serves as a standalone, full-length narrative where a serial killer hunts the people of Springfield. It is a parody of the 1997 horror film I Know What You Did Last Summer. The episode marks the first speaking appearance of the characters Apu Nahasapeemapetilon and his wife, Manjula, in nearly a decade, reintroducing them with new voice actors Sunil Malhotra and Janina Gavankar. It also features a guest appearance by Venezuelan conductor Gustavo Dudamel. The episode received positive reviews, with fans praising it for addressing the controversy surrounding Apu.

== Plot ==
The Simpsons attend a safe Halloween celebration at Town Hall. Homer receives a text message to meet at a brewery where he attends a beer party. When they are too drunk to drive home, Homer, Dewey Largo, Superintendent Chalmers, and Professor Frink decide to go home in the latter's self-driving car. While going over a bridge, the car loses control and hits a pedestrian wearing a hooded monk robe and a full robot helmet, who is seemingly killed. Afraid of the consequences, they throw the body over the bridge into the water. Homer feels guilty for the next year.

On the following Halloween, Homer receives a message that karma is coming. He meets with a guilty Largo and Frink while Chalmers reassures them. That night, Largo is killed with a machete by a person in the same outfit as the person they threw over the bridge.

At Largo's funeral, Chalmers threatens Homer and Frink if they try to confess, so they suspect he killed Largo. The two go to Chalmers' home and see he has had trouble coping with the incident. When Chalmers returns, they hide in the closet. As he threatens to shoot into the closet, the helmeted person kills Chalmers. Homer escapes, but Frink is also killed. At home, Marge confesses that she was also involved in killing the helmet person.

One year ago, she went on a party boat that ran over a helmeted person in the water. Marge says that all the party attendees have been killed except her.

Homer and Marge seek safety at Town Hall and discover that all the townsfolk thought they had seemingly killed the helmeted person. Chief Wiggum reassures the safety of the residents, but is killed by the helmeted person. When Marge demands that the person reveal themselves, the person removes the robot helmet, revealing that he is Apu, as he explains his motive.

Last Halloween, Apu was walking home but was constantly injured by the townsfolk until he arrived on an island where Dr. Nick heals him. Apu is told that the island was used as a dumping ground by Springfield. Dr. Nick states that he does not know how he got here, as Leon Kompowsky was also seen on the island. Apu leaves for Springfield on a makeshift raft, being enraged when he learns that the island is thirty minutes away from Springfield. When he returns, no one notices him, his family has left and the Kwik-E-Mart was abandoned. Seeking revenge, he plans to burn everyone in the building. Homer tells Apu to kill him to spare the rest. He hands his lighter to Homer, who accidentally drops it, setting the building on fire. Apu states to Homer that this is on him as the fire closes in on Homer and Apu, causing an explosion.

Just then, it is revealed that the events of this episode were a dream after Apu dozed off at the Kwik-E-Mart. Manjula Nahasapeemapetilon prepares to take the Nahasapeemapetilon octuplets trick or treating. Purchasing some Duff Beer, Homer invites Apu to his Halloween party and assures him that Springfield loves him. Apu accepts the invitation but states that he wishes he had a costume. Homer says that it does not matter since he is not wearing one either. As Apu locks up for the night and leaves with Homer, the scene shows the robot helmet and hooded monk robe under the checkout desk as the robot helmet lights up on its own.

During the credits, the robot helmet plays Daft Punk's "Robot Rock".

== Production ==
=== Format and development ===
The episode was conceived as a prelude to the series' traditional annual anthology "Treehouse of Horror XXXVII" which aired one week later on October 25, 2026. It represents a continuation of the show's format experimentation with Halloween-themed programming, following previous full-length continuous narratives such as the twenty-seventh season episode "Halloween of Horror" and thirty-fourth season Stephen King parody "Not It".

=== Casting ===
The episode marked the return of Kwik-E-Mart owner Apu Nahasapeemapetilon, who had been heavily scaled back into a non-speaking background character following the 2017 release of the documentary The Problem with Apu. Apu had not spoken a line of dialogue on the show since the October 2017 episode "The Serfsons". Original voice actor Hank Azaria officially stepped down from voicing the character in 2020, due to George Floyd protests.

Voice-over veteran Sunil Malhotra was cast as the new voice of Apu, while Janina Gavankar took over the role of his wife, Manjula. According to reports, Malhotra's hiring and the return of the character were kept under strict non-disclosure agreements throughout the episode's table reads and subsequent animation production stages. The reveal was not promoted, and no screeners of the episode were sent to reviewers. The idea to bring back Apu was the idea of writer Nick Dahan and co-showrunner Cesar Mazariegos. Executive producer Matt Selman liked the concept and its reference to the controversy of the character. When Malhotra was asked about a role on the series, he knew it would likely involve Apu. He was interested in the role but was willing to decline it if the character was stereotypical. He asked to talk with Selman and Mazariegos to collaborate with the development of the character, and they agreed. Selman confirmed following the broadcast that Apu would remain a regular character moving forward in the series.

Conductor Gustavo Dudamel also guest starred as the avatar of his likeness used for the video game Baton Hero.

== Reception ==
"Treehouse of Horror Presents: The Revengening" premiered on Fox Network at 8:00 p.m. ET on October 18, 2026. In the United States, the episode was watched by a total of 0.98 million viewers during its original broadcast. It recorded a 0.26% audience share among adults aged 18 to 49, meaning that it was watched by 0.26% of all households within that demographic. This represented a decline in viewership compared to the previous episode, "Diary of a Chimpy Kid," which had achieved a 0.27% rating and attracted 1.01 million viewers.

Marcus Gibson of Bubbleblabber gave the episode an 8 out of 10. He liked the return of Apu and the jokes regarding the characters refusing to admit their mistakes. He also liked that a horror parody could be sustained for a full episode unlike the normal Treehouse of Horror episode. Alex Reif of Laughing Place felt the plot was a repeat from the "Treehouse of Horror X" segment "I Know What You Diddily-Iddily-Did". He liked the references to past episodes on the island and the characters dressed as Disney characters for Halloween.

Marisa Roffman of Give Me My Remote liked the return of Apu but did not like that he returned as a killer until it was revealed to be a dream. She highlighted the animation of the Kwik-E-Mart because it has not been seen in a long time, as well as the references on the island. She also noted the violence and gore in the episode. Tania Hussain of Collider noted that Apu’s return corrected the mistake of his absence, "because instead of ignoring Apu’s long absence, the series finally admits that it didn’t know how to handle the issue."

Comedian Hari Kondabolu, the filmmaker behind The Problem with Apu, praised the decision to revive and recast Apu via an email to The New York Times, adding, "I’m hoping this stops all the hate mail in many languages that has been sent my way over the past decade.."
