= Dream Scenari-Moe =

- The Simpsons episode
- Episode no.: Season 38; Episode 7
- Directed by: Eric Koenig
- Written by: Broti Gupta
- Production code: 37ABF15
- Original air date: November 15, 2026

Guest appearances
- Eric Bauza as Mr. Fong and Harry Metsali; James Austin Johnson as Dr. De La Mañana; Meg Ryan as Sam; Sunil Malhotra as Apu Nahasapeemapetilon

Episode chronology
← Previous "The Kosmic Kruiser"	Next → "Curb Your Expectations"
- The Simpsons season 38

"Dream Scenari-Moe" is the seventh episode of the thirty-eighth season of the American animated television series The Simpsons, and the 816th episode overall. It aired in the United States on Fox on November 15, 2026. The episode was written by Broti Gupta and directed by Eric Koenig.

In this episode, Moe uses a sleep chamber when he is unable to sleep. The late Eric Bauza, James Austin Johnson, Sunil Malhotra, and Meg Ryan guest starred. The episode received positive reviews.

== Plot ==
Moe is unable to sleep. Marge wants to help, so Lisa suggests he go to a sleep lab. He agrees to try an experimental sleep chamber and immediately falls asleep. In his dream, he is a New York newspaper columnist. When his editor hires a new columnist named Sam, Moe is angry. Sam, who is female, says Moe is afraid of change while she embraces the future. His editor suggests they compete to see who is better at writing a story about Times Square turning from a place for adult entertainment into a family friendly area. As they write their stories, they compliment each other's style but fight to deliver their stories until they end up kissing. Moe wakes up and thinks he is in love.

Although his friends at the bar warn that dreams do not carry over to the next night, his next dream also involves Sam. Meanwhile, the townsfolk start having nightmares where Moe is a monster that scares them. During the day, they become afraid of Moe while his relationship with Sam continues in his dreams.

When Moe sees his bar vandalized, Barney says it is because he is in their nightmares. Lisa sees that the products people are buying are similar to what they are seeing in their dreams, so the Simpsons and Moe confront the scientist running the sleep chamber. He says that in the age of streaming television, corporations need a new way to sell products, so they use the sleep chamber to project the ugliness of Moe to the town as they sleep to implant thoughts while removing it from Moe as he sleeps. The Simpsons ask Moe to stop, but he refuses. In his next dream, he proposes to Sam. She accepts. As she lists his wonderful qualities, she mentions that he is good to everyone even if they are not good to him. Feeling guilty, Moe wakes up and destroys the sleep chamber.

Later, the townsfolk help restore Moe's Tavern while Moe hopes to dream about Sam again.

== Production ==
Eric Bauza posthumously guest starred as Mr. Fong and Harry Metsali. He performed with "dozens of voices" to give the creative team options for his characters, The episode was dedicated in his memory. Meg Ryan guest starred as Sam. She previously appeared in the eighteenth season episode "Yokel Chords". James Austin Johnson guest starred as Dr. De La Mañana.

== Cultural references ==
The plot is a parody of the 2023 film Dream Scenario with the dreams being parodies of Nora Ephron films such as Sleepless in Seattle and When Harry Met Sally....

== Reception ==
"Dream Scenari-Moe" aired simultaneously in the United States in all time zones at 8:30 PM ET/5:30 PM PT following a special episode of the television series Animal Control. In the United States, the episode was watched by a total of 2.66 million viewers during its original broadcast. It achieved a 0.77% audience share among adults aged 18 to 49, meaning that it was watched by 0.77% of all households within that demographic. This represented an increase in viewership compared to the previous episode, "The Kosmic Kruiser," which earned a 0.54% rating and drew 2.16 million viewers.

Marcus Gibson of Bubbleblabber gave the episode a 7 out of 10. He would have preferred the episode had multiple rom-com parodies but liked the struggle of Moe choosing between happiness and the townsfolk. He also highlighted the posthumous performance by Eric Bauza. Alex Reif of Laughing Place liked the sentimental focus on Moe. He liked the romantic comedy parody and Bauza's performances.. Marisa Roffman of Give Me My Remote liked that she did not know where the story would go. She also liked the focus on Moe and the reason for the nightmares.
