= The Simpsons season 38 =

Season of television series

The Simpsons
- Season 38
- Promotional poster featuring the Simpson family
- Showrunner: Matt Selman
- No. of episodes: 7

Release
- Original network: Fox; Disney+ (select episodes)
- Original release: September 27, 2026 – present

Season chronology
- ← Previous; Season 37

The thirty-eighth season of the American animated sitcom The Simpsons premiered on Fox on September 27, 2026. The season is the second of four seasons ordered by Fox. It was produced by Gracie Films and 20th Television Animation. The primary showrunner for the season is Matt Selman. In addition to the Fox broadcast season, several episodes were ordered by Disney+ and are scheduled to be released exclusively through the streaming service.

== Voice cast and characters ==
=== Main cast ===
- Dan Castellaneta as Homer Simpson, Sideshow Mel, Barney Gumble, Mayor Quimby, Hans Moleman, Arnie Pye, Groundskeeper Willie, Krusty the Clown, Mr. Teeny, Mr. Goodboy, Snowball II, Grampa Simpson, Rich Texan, Santa's Little Helper, State Comptroller Atkins, Squeaky-Voiced Teen, Gil Gunderson, additional voices
- Julie Kavner as Marge Simpson, Patty and Selma Bouvier
- Nancy Cartwright as Bart Simpson, Nelson Muntz, Ralph Wiggum, Kearney Zzyzwicz, Todd Flanders, Maggie Simpson
- Yeardley Smith as Lisa Simpson
- Hank Azaria as Superintendent Chalmers, Coach Krupt, Moe Szyslak, Captain McCallister, Chief Wiggum, Raphael, Snake Jailbird, Larry H. Lawyer Jr., Professor Frink, Disco Stu, Comic Book Guy, Luigi Risotto, Duffman, Kirk Van Houten, Cletus Spuckler, additional voices
- Harry Shearer as Principal Skinner, Dewey Largo, Geoffrey, God, Kent Brockman, Rainier Wolfcastle, Otto Mann, Lenny Leonard, Ned Flanders, Mr. Burns, Reverend Lovejoy, Dr. Marvin Monroe, Waylon Smithers, additional voices

=== Recurring cast ===
- Tress MacNeille as Agnes Skinner, Dolph Shapiro, Ms. Albright, Lunchlady Dora, Mrs. Vanderbilt, Shauna Chalmers, additional voices
- Kevin Michael Richardson as Dr. Hibbert, additional voices
- Rosalie Chiang as Hubert Wong
- Mo Collins as Jimbo Jones
- Grey DeLisle as Gloria Prince, Martin Prince, additional voices
- Alex Désert as Carl Carlson, Officer Lou
- Chris Edgerly as Rod Flanders, additional voices
- Janina Gavankar as Manjula Nahasapeemapetilon
- Dawnn Lewis as Bernice Hibbert, additional voices
- Jonathan Lipow as various animals
- Eric Lopez as Dr. Nick Riviera
- Kelly Macleod as Milhouse van Houten
- Sunil Malhotra as Apu Nahasapeemapetilon
- Maggie Roswell as Helen Lovejoy, Miss Hoover, Luann Van Houten, additional voices
- Jenny Yokobori as Kumiko Albertson

=== Guest cast ===
Guest stars for the season include Emma Thompson, Henry Winkler, Rachel Bloom, Gustavo Dudamel, Jenny Nicholson, Colin Jost, Tiffany Haddish, Jeff Probst, James Austin Johnson, Meg Ryan, Luka Dončić, Ken Jeong, Janina Gavankar, Sunil Malhotra, Kelsey Grammer, Andy Cohen, Kerry Washington, Stephanie Ittleson, Rosalie Chiang, Maurice LaMarche, Olivia Wilde, Joe Mantegna, Owen Wilson, Kara Talve, and the late Eric Bauza, who recorded his dialogue before his unexpected death.

== Episodes ==
No. overall	No. in season (Note: Episodes without an episode number within the season constitute exclusive episodes commissioned and released by Disney+.)	Title	Directed by	Written by	Original release date	Prod. code	U.S. viewers (millions)
810	1	"The Children's Book Job"	Matthew Nastuk	Dan Vebber	September 27, 2026	37ABF10	1.03
Marge becomes the President of the PTA at Springfield Elementary and tries to save the school from being closed down by getting reclusive children's author Constance Clavinger to read to the children. But when Marge gets Homer to collect Constance from the airport, getting her to the school is more troublesome than it would seem. For once, Homer isn't the main problem. Guest stars: Colin Jost as himself, Emma Thompson as Constance Clavinger
811	2	"Diary of a Chimpy Kid"	Timothy Bailey	Rob LaZebnik	October 4, 2026	37ABF09	1.01
Bart and Lisa adopt a baby chimpanzee and argue over their different parenting styles. However, the chimp gets chimp-napped by workers for a private animal zoo. Meanwhile, Homer is afraid the chimp will grow up and rip off his face and groin. He has a vivid dream about it where monkey surgeons attach his face where his groin should be. Guest stars: Ike Barinholtz as Wayne the Grip
812	3	"Treehouse of Horror Presents: The Revengening"	Eddie Rosas	Nick Dahan	October 18, 2026	37ABF13	0.98
On Halloween night, Homer, Chalmers, Frink and Mr. Largo all run off drunk from a Halloween party and accidentally drive into a masked man, seemingly murdering him. Homer initially suggests reporting the murder to the police, but Chalmers says to leave the situation under wraps. A year later, the four are sent cards with the word "karma" on them, written in blood, and everyone excluding Homer is killed by the man. Homer runs home to Marge to warn her that he is in dire straits, but it turns out that she, and almost everyone else still around in Springfield has run into the exact same situation that Homer's in. Guest stars: Gustavo Dudamel as himself, Janina Gavankar as Manjula Nahasapeemapetilon, Sunil Malhotra as Apu Nahasapeemapetilon
813	4	"Treehouse of Horror XXXVII"	David Silverman	Joel H. Cohen & Jessica Conrad & Tim Long	October 25, 2026	37ABF14	4.11
Prologue: The cast introduce the special in a stop-motion animated tribute to The Nightmare Before Christmas by Stoopid Buddy Stoodios. "Bride's Shed Revisited": In a parody of The Husbands on their first-year anniversary, Marge and Homer build a shed that alters reality by giving Marge new husbands. "Dog Boy Afternoon": In this Pet Sematary meets Freaky Friday segment, Homer accidentally kills both Bart and Santa's Little Helper and buries them in the same grave. A bolt of lightning brings them back to life, but in the wrong bodies. "Vehicular Dadslaughter": Seven years in the future, teenage Bart and Lisa discover their Aunt Patty and Aunt Selma are witches that have trapped their father in a driver's education film. Guest stars: Tiffany Haddish as Tiffany, Jeff Probst as himself, Stephanie Ittleson as Additional Voices
814	5	"Testing 1-2-3"	Matthew Faughnan	J. Stewart Burns	November 1, 2026	37ABF12	0.96
Jealous upon seeing Hubert Wong getting a private room and extra time to take his test, Lisa decides to get herself tested for neurodiversity. While she takes the test, the questions remind her of characteristics she has seen in other people. Into the Neurodiverse: Principal Skinner's autism is explored, when after a meeting with the Springfield school board, he gets promoted to high school principal and leads a Saturday detention. Attention Deficit Homer Disorder: Homer's ADHD causes him to get easily distracted, as he drags his family from a pop-up meat sandwich shop to the Springfield renaissance fair. The Neatly-Arranged Adventures of O.C.D. Man: In order to improve sales at the Android's Dungeon, Kumiko suggests sprucing up the place with some plants, causing Comic Book Guy's OCD to go haywire. Guest stars: Rachel Bloom as Annette, Rosalie Chiang as Hubert Wong
815	6	"The Kosmic Kruiser"	Mike Frank Polcino	Brian Kelley	November 8, 2026	37ABF11	2.16
Bart convinces Lisa to harken back to their younger days being "Super Explorers" together by sneaking into the ruins of the Kosmic Kruiser hotel; Krustyland’s most expensive and embarrassing failure. But when they do they discover the former attraction isn't as abandoned as they once thought, and Lisa discovers Bart has ulterior motives for going inside. Guest stars: Jenny Nicholson as KIT-10 and Robotic Voice, Jimmi Simpson as Don Jeffries and Man Additional vocals: Kara Talve as Qu’ee-tar performing “Space Sensation" Note: This episode was dedicated in memory of Patrick Stewart, who voiced Number One in the episode "Homer the Great". He died on October 28, 2026 following a "brief and poignant journey" with Alzheimer's disease and Lewy body dementia.
816	7	"Dream Scenari-Moe"	Eric Koenig	Broti Gupta	November 15, 2026	37ABF15	2.66
Moe's never-ending insomnia leads him to a sleeping study, where he continuously dreams of being a top journalist who falls in love with Sam Wheaton, his replacement. Despite his pleasant dreams, the chemicals sprayed on him in the experiment are transmitted out to the people of Springfield, who each have nightmares featuring Moe. Guest stars: Eric Bauza as Mr. Fong and Harry Metsali, James Austin Johnson as Dr. De La Mañana, Meg Ryan as Sam Wheaton, Sunil Malhotra as Apu Nahasapeemapetilon Note: This episode was dedicated in memory of Eric Bauza who died of hypertensive heart disease on October 25, 2026 sometime after recording his roles for this episode.
817	8	"Curb Your Expectations"	TBA	TBA	November 22, 2026	TBA	TBD
818	9	"Jersey Score"	TBA	TBA	November 29, 2026	TBA	TBD
819	10	"Don't Marge with Texas"	TBA	TBA	December 6, 2026	TBA	TBD
820	11	"Bog"	TBA	TBA	December 13, 2026	TBA	TBD
821	12	"The Offendables"	TBA	TBA	December 20, 2026	TBA	TBD
822	13	"Lock, Stock and One Stupid Narrator"	TBA	TBA	December 27, 2026	TBA	TBD
823	14	"Billionaire on the Bayou"	TBA	TBA	January 3, 2027	TBA	TBD
824	15	"Lenny Goes Squiggy"	TBA	TBA	January 3, 2027	TBA	TBD

== Production ==
On April 2, 2025, following the release of the thirty-sixth season, it was announced that Fox had renewed The Simpsons for four more seasons, intending to take it to the fortieth season, with fifteen episodes each. In addition, two episodes per season were ordered to be released exclusively on the streaming service Disney+. Executive producer Matt Selman continued his role as primary showrunner, a role he had since the thirty-third season. Selman had previously been the showrunner for several episodes each season since the twenty-third season.

=== Casting ===
After a long absence since "The Serfsons", Apu Nahasapeemapetilon and Manjula Nahasapeemapetilon return in "Treehouse of Horror Presents: The Revengening", voiced by Sunil Malhotra and Janina Gavankar. The characters were previously voiced by Hank Azaria, the late Jan Hooks and Tress MacNeille.

== Release ==
The season premiered on September 27, 2026, on Fox's Animation Domination block along with Animal Control, Grimsburg, and Universal Basic Guys.
