= The Kosmic Kruiser =

- The Simpsons episode
- Episode no.: Season 38; Episode 6
- Directed by: Mike Frank Polcino
- Written by: Brian Kelley
- Production code: 37ABF11
- Original air date: November 8, 2026

Guest appearances
- Jenny Nicholson as KIT-10; Jimmi Simpson as Don Jeffries; Kara Talve as Qu’ee-tar (performing the song Space Sensation)

Episode chronology
| ← Previous "Testing 1-2-3" | Next → "Dream Scenari-Moe" |
- The Simpsons season 38

"The Kosmic Kruiser" is the sixth episode of the thirty-eighth season of the American animated television series The Simpsons, and the 815th episode overall. It aired in the United States on Fox on November 8, 2026. The episode was written by Brian Kelley and directed by Mike Frank Polcino.

In this episode, Bart and Lisa explore an abandoned immersive hotel at Krustyland. Jenny Nicholson and Jimmi Simpson, and Kara Talve (credited under Additional Vocals) guest starred. The episode received mixed reviews.

The episode was dedicated in memory of Patrick Stewart who died on October 28, 2026 following a "brief and poignant journey" with Alzheimer's disease and Lewy body dementia, and who lent his voice to "Number One" in the episode "Homer the Great".

== Plot ==
After winning an academic contest, Lisa Simpson is rewarded with selecting the next family outing. Bart Simpson suggests going to Krustyland. Lisa is reluctant because they have been there before, but Bart convinces her because of their previous experience there as "Super Explorers". Bart tells Homer Simpson and Marge Simpson to spend the day at a bar in the park. Because Lisa is afraid of the scarier rides, Bart leads her to the abandoned Kosmic Kruiser immersive hotel, an idea of former park CEO Don Jeffries, in which guests could interact with Itchy & Scratchy characters in a space war cruiser. The cruise director was a robot named KIT-10. Six months after it opened, the hotel was closed to be "retooled" due to high costs and low interest and Jeffries was fired and disgraced. Bart and Lisa go inside and get scared when they see figures emerging from the shadows.

The figures reveal themselves to be the actors who worked at the hotel and refused to abandon their roles. Bart and Lisa choose to be characters on the side of CAT, but Lisa reveals that her character is actually on the side of MOUSE. She is taken away, but gets scared when she finds park employees squatting in the hotel. Meanwhile, Bart searches for KIT-10. When Lisa asks to leave, Bart refuses until he can take KIT-10 as a valuable collectible. Lisa realizes that Bart duped her just to steal the robot. Suddenly, the hotel lifts off the ground to the confusion of everyone.

When everyone panics, Don Jeffries emerges from his cryogenic slumbers and explains that Krusty has lifted the hotel by helicopter and plans to drop it in the ocean as a tax write-off. When Lisa wants to get to the roof to signal the helicopter, KIT-10 appears to direct her and Bart to a side door with a ladder to the roof. Bart tells KIT-10 to climb the ladder, but its software causes it to explode and fall into the water below when it comes across a "bundle and save" spam. Bart is afraid to climb the ladder due to his fear of heights. He says he will do it with Lisa, but she is also afraid. Using their memories as "Super Explorers", Bart gets Lisa to climb the ladder with him. They get to the roof and get the attention of the helicopter pilot, who returns the hotel to the park much to the dismay of his passenger Krusty.

As they leave the park for the day, Homer notices that the hotel landed on their car.

== Production ==
Jenny Nicholson guest starred as KIT-10. Nicholson had posted a 4-hour video about the failures of the Star Wars: Galactic Starcruiser hotel in 2024. Jimmi Simpson guest starred as Don Jeffries.

== Cultural references ==
The Kosmic Kruiser hotel is a parody of the Star Wars: Galactic Starcruiser hotel that operated at Walt Disney World from 2022 to 2023. Don Jeffries is a parody of former Disney CEO Bob Chapek, who approved the Galactic Starcruiser hotel when he ran the parks division and which opened when he was CEO. Bart's attempt to steal KIT-10 is similar to the story of the 2025 documentary Stolen Kingdom in which two people explore an abandoned attraction and the disappearance of one of its animatronic figures.

== Reception ==
"The Kosmic Kruiser" aired simultaneously in the United States in all time zones at 8:30 PM ET/5:30 PM PT following a special episode of the television series Animal Control. In the United States, the episode was watched by a total of 2.16 million viewers during its original broadcast. It garnered a 0.54% audience share among adults aged 18–49, meaning it was watched by 0.54% of all households in that demographic. This represented an increase in viewership compared to the previous episode, "Testing 1-2-3", which earned a 0.27% rating and attracted 0.96 million viewers.

Marcus Gibson of Bubbleblabber gave the episode a 7.5 out of 10. He liked the Bart and Lisa dynamic in the episode and liked experiencing an immersive hotel without having to pay for it. However, he thought the resolution of the story could have been better. Alex Reif of Laughing Place thought the episode would not be understood by viewers who were not familiar with the history of Disney theme parks. He felt those who knew would enjoy the episode more. Marisa Roffman of Give Me My Remote also liked the dynamic between Bart and Lisa but felt the episode would not be relevant in future years. Due to the lag time in animation, she thought the episode was already irrelevant when it aired.
