= Treehouse of Horror XXXVII =

- The Simpsons episode
- Promotional poster
- Episode no.: Season 38; Episode 4
- Directed by: David Silverman
- Written by: "Bride's Shed Revisited": Joel H. Cohen; "Dog Boy Afternoon": Jessica Conrad; "Vehicular Dadslaughter": Tim Long
- Production code: 37ABF14
- Original air date: October 25, 2026

Guest appearances
- Tiffany Haddish as Tiffany; Jeff Probst as himself; Stephanie Ittleson as Additional Voices

Episode chronology
← Previous "Treehouse of Horror Presents: The Revengening"	Next → "Testing 1-2-3"
- The Simpsons season 38

"Treehouse of Horror XXXVII" is the fourth episode of the thirty-eighth season of the American animated television series The Simpsons, and the 813th episode overall. It aired in the United States on Fox on October 25, 2026. The episode's segments were individually written by Joel H. Cohen, Jessica Conrad, and Tim Long. It was directed by David Silverman.

In "Bride's Shed Revisited", Marge is able to switch her husband's identity. In "Dog Boy Afternoon", Bart and Santa's Little Helper return in swapped bodies after they die. In "Vehicular Dadslaughter", Homer becomes trapped in a driver's education video.

Tiffany Haddish, Jeff Probst, and Stephanie Ittleson guest starred. The episode received mixed reviews from critics; "Vehicular Dadslaughter" received a more positive reception while "Bride's Shed Revisited" was more negative and "Dog Boy Afternoon" had a more polarizing reception.

== Plot ==
=== Opening segment ===
The characters are all stop-motion parodies of the characters from The Nightmare Before Christmas: Bart Simpson as Jack Skellington, Homer Simpson as the Mayor of Halloween Town, Marge Simpson as Sally, Lisa Simpson as Shock, Santa's Little Helper as Zero, Patty and Selma as two of the Vampire Brothers, Professor Frink as Doctor Finkelstein, Sideshow Bob as the Cyclops, Comic Book Guy as Behemoth, Krusty the Clown as the Clown with the Tear Away Face, and Ned Flanders as Oogie Boogie.

=== "Bride's Shed Revisited" ===
When Homer delays building a shed in their backyard, Marge does it herself. When she forces Homer to put a screwdriver in the shed, he comes out as Lenny, which horrifies Marge. Seeing how their house has changed, she tries to force Lenny away with a chair. He takes the chair and puts it in the shed, which changes him to Chief Wiggum. Realizing her husband changes every time he enters the shed, her best friend Tiffany tells her to find the perfect husband using the shed. When Jeff Probst comes out of the shed, she settles for him until she sees Homer, who does not recognize Marge. Unable to get over Homer, she forces Homer to go into the shed with her. They emerge remarried but with Rod and Todd as their children.

=== "Dog Boy Afternoon" ===
When Marge cooks an unappetizing dinner, Homer, Bart, and Santa's Little Helper eat at a restaurant. When Santa's Little Helper is killed chasing after a meatball, Homer buries him but accidentally kills Bart in the process, so he buries Bart in the same grave. Later, lightning strikes the grave, and the boy and dog are reanimated in each other's body. While Homer becomes worried that someone will notice, Bart is able to communicate to Lisa what happened. As Lisa and Homer argue, Santa's Little Helper chews up Homer's hat, so he attacks Santa's Little Helper, which causes Bart to attack Homer. He takes Bart to be euthanized. Santa's Little Helper calls on other dogs for help. They maul and kill Homer. Bart and Lisa bury Homer in a grave, but lightning reanimates Homer and Snowball I in each other's body.

=== "Vehicular Dadslaughter" ===
Seven years after Homer disappeared, Bart and Lisa take driver's education where they notice the main character in the training videos looks like Homer. They break into the DMV to investigate and encounter the witches Patty and Selma. Bart and Lisa are duped into getting their license photo taken and are transported into a training video where they reunite with Homer. To escape, they need to drive according to the rules of the road. While Patty and Selma try to incite Homer into breaking the rules, Lisa reminds him of the rules. Bart and Lisa realize they can break the rules to help Homer, so Patty and Selma disable Homer and Lisa. Bart completes the final challenge. They return home. Meanwhile, Patty and Selma are trapped in an endless DMV (short for Damnation Most Vile) line.

During the credits, the photo stills of the characters dressed as different characters from The Nightmare Before Christmas are seen.

== Production ==
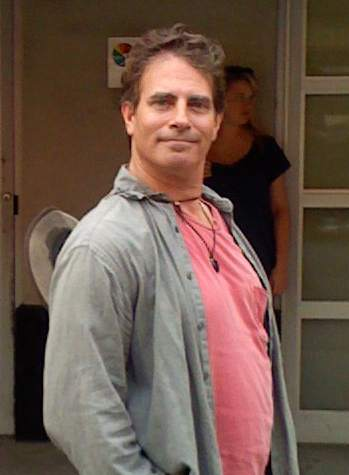
David Silverman directed the episode.

The opening segment featured a parody of the 1993 film The Nightmare Before Christmas that was produced by Stoopid Buddy Stoodios. Executive producer Matt Selman pitched the idea to Stoopid Buddy two year earlier but work on the segment did not start until June 2026. Writer Tim Long and director David Silverman decided which characters would be parodies of the Nightmare characters. Bart is a parody of Jack Skellington, Homer is the Mayor, Marge is Sally, and Ned Flanders is Oogie Boogie.

The first segment, written by Joel H. Cohen, is a parody of the novel The Husbands by Holly Gramazio. The second segment, written by Jessica Conrad, is a parody of the novel Pet Sematary. It is also parody of the novel Freaky Friday. The final segment, written by Long, is a parody of driver's education videos. The episode coincided with the "Munchie Meal of Horror" promotion from the fast food restaurant Jack in the Box.

Tiffany Haddish guest starred as Tiffany. Television presenter Jeff Probst appeared as himself.

== Reception ==
"Treehouse of Horror XXXVII" premiered on Fox Network at 8:00 p.m. ET on October 25, 2026. In the United States, the episode was watched by a total of 4.11 million viewers during its original broadcast. It recorded a 1.28% audience share among adults aged 18 to 49, meaning that it was watched by 1.28% of all households within that demographic. This represented an increase in viewership compared to the previous episode, "Treehouse of Horror Presents: The Revengening", which achieved a 0.26% rating and drew 0.98 million viewers.

Jesse Schedeen of IGN gave the episode a 7 out of 10. He preferred the previous week's Treehouse special. He enjoyed the depiction of the Simpson family at different ages and noted the aging performance of Julie Kavner in the episode. John Schwarz of Bubbleblabber gave the episode a 7.5 out of 10. He was confused why the first segment was set in the past while using modern technology. He preferred the violence and scarier elements in the later two segments.

Alex Reif of Laughing Place enjoyed the Nightmare Before Christmas parody and the final segment. He liked that the episode was more family-friendly after the more violent Treehouse special aired the previous week. Marisa Roffman of Give Me My Remote liked the opening sequence and the final segment. She thought the first segment was a repeat of XXX's "Heaven Swipes Right", and the second segment was a repeat of VIII's "Fly vs. Fly".
