= Diary of a Chimpy Kid =

- The Simpsons episode
- Bart and Lisa find a baby chimpanzee.
- Episode no.: Season 38; Episode 2
- Directed by: Timothy Bailey
- Written by: Rob LaZebnik
- Production code: 37ABF09
- Original air date: October 4, 2026

Guest appearance
- Ike Barinholtz as Wayne the Grip

Episode chronology
| ← Previous "The Children's Book Job" | Next → "Treehouse of Horror Presents: The Revengening" |
- The Simpsons season 38

"Diary of a Chimpy Kid" is the second episode of the thirty-eighth season of the American animated television series The Simpsons, and the 811th episode overall. It aired in the United States on Fox on October 4, 2026. The episode was written by Rob LaZebnik and directed by Timothy Bailey.

The series follows the dysfunctional Simpson family, consisting of patriarch Homer (Dan Castellaneta), matriarch Marge (Julie Kavner), son Bart (Nancy Cartwright), oldest daughter Lisa (Yeardley Smith), and youngest Maggie, as they live out their misadventures in the town of Springfield. In the episode, Bart and Lisa adopt a baby monkey, and fight over how to raise it. Ike Barinholtz guest starred. The episode received positive reviews from critics.

== Plot ==
When Itchy & Scratchy enter the public domain, Krusty the Clown creates a version of his show featuring baby versions of the characters. When the babies do not cooperate during filming, he scraps the project and has the baby chimpanzee that was cast as Mr. Teeny placed in a public bookcase where it is adopted by Bart and Lisa Simpson. They name the chimpanzee Mr. Goodboy. Bart starts coddling Mr. Goodboy and tries to be protective of it. On the other hand, Lisa tries to be hands-free to let it learn from its own mistakes. Their clashing parenting styles cause them to argue.

Meanwhile, Homer and Marge see Bart and Lisa being responsible, so they decide to watch a video on how to raise a chimpanzee. However, Homer becomes scared when he learns that chimpanzees rip off the face and groin of their human caretaker. Seeing Bart and Lisa fight, Homer and Marge tell them to go to therapy. At school, Bart and Lisa leave Mr. Goodboy in the waiting room of the school therapist. Nelson, who has taken over the job of the therapist because it was defunded, gets them to agree that they both want to care for Mr. Goodboy. However, they discover that Mr. Goodboy has wandered away. A tracking app shows that Mr. Goodboy is at an exploitative libertarian private zoo/doomsday shooting range called Freedom Chimps after its owners capture it outside the school. On their way to Freedom Chimps, Bart and Lisa apologize to each other for criticizing their parenting styles.

At the Freedom Chimps, Bart and Lisa fight their way past competing documentarians like one who directed the third Fyre Festival, one who directed the second Theranos, and one who directed the Sam Bankman-Fried polycule documentary. They find Mr. Goodboy in a cage full of chimpanzees. They unlock the cage, but the agitated chimpanzees surround Bart and Lisa. To rescue them, Homer exposes his groin, which causes them to chase after him until he hides under a tortoise to the sound of Phil Collins' "You'll Be in My Heart".

A wildlife rescue service called Ape Solutions retrieves the monkeys to take them to a natural habitat as Freedom Chimps violated 30 regulations like using a vending machine for a reptile house. All the animals will be going to an actual wildlife sanctuary that has 50 acres of chimpanzee habitat. The owners are being arrested as the female owner states that they will not take their secret monkeys. The male owner Clark then states "Don't listen to my sister. There are no secret monkeys. Or secret tigers. Or secret tiger-monkey breeding facility". Surprised that the Freedom Chimps owners are siblings, Bart and Lisa are then told by an Ape Solutions member that they have obsessed over wild animals since they found a circus bear cub in a garbage can. Not wanting to go down the same path, Bart and Lisa decide to have Mr. Goodboy go to the habitat as well to make sure it will be safe.

During the credits, Homer tries to use the same vending machine that was being used as a reptile house.

== Production ==
"Diary of a Chimpy Kid" was written by Rob LaZebnik and directed by Timothy Bailey. Ike Barinholtz guest starred in the episode as Wayne the Grip, who first appeared in the thirty-sixth season episode "Homer and Her Sisters". Showrunner Matt Selman described the plot as follows: "Homer watches a YouTube video about what adult chimpanzees do to their human owners—ripping off their fingers, faces, and genitals." He concluded, "There is some comedy about genital mutilation in that episode, but I am very satisfied with the result!"

== Release and reception ==
"Diary of a Chimpy Kid" premiered on Fox Network at 8:00 p.m. ET on October 4, 2026. In the United States, the episode was watched by a total of 1.01 million viewers during its original broadcast. It recorded a 0.27% audience share among adults aged 18 to 49, meaning it was watched by 0.27% of all households in that demographic. This represented a drop in viewership compared to the previous episode, "The Children's Book Job", which had achieved a 0.23% rating and attracted 1.03 million viewers.

Marcus Gibson of Bubbleblabber gave the episode a 7.5 out of 10. He liked the monkey jokes and the theme of Bart and Lisa learning to be parents. However, he thought the plot was not original. Marisa Roffman of Give Me My Remote liked that the parenting styles of Bart and Lisa were not as expected. She also liked the jokes regarding the entertainment industry.

Although Alex Reif of Laughing Place loved the premise, he criticized the fact that Lisa seems less perceptive than usual, noting that "the Lisa Simpson I know wouldn't be so easily swayed by parenting advice books." He considered the highlight to be the moment "when the family arrives at Freedom Chimps and finds it teeming with documentary filmmakers wearing hats from the streaming platforms for which they make their films."
