= The Children's Book Job =

- The Simpsons episode
- Episode no.: Season 38; Episode 1
- Directed by: Matthew Nastuk
- Written by: Dan Vebber
- Production code: 37ABF10
- Original air date: September 27, 2026

Guest appearances
- Colin Jost as himself; Emma Thompson as Constance Clavinger

Episode chronology
← Previous "Yellow Mirror"	Next → "Diary of a Chimpy Kid"
- The Simpsons season 38

"The Children's Book Job" is the thirty-eighth season premiere of the American animated television series The Simpsons, and the 810th episode overall. It aired in the United States on Fox on September 27, 2026. The episode was written by Dan Vebber and directed by Matthew Nastuk.

In the episode, a children's book author travels to Springfield to give a talk to the students of Springfield Elementary School. Colin Jost and Emma Thompson guest starred. The episode received positive reviews.

== Plot ==
In the American town of Springfield, Marge—the matriarch of the Simpson family—becomes president of the PTA at Springfield Elementary School, where her children Bart and Lisa attend. Learning that the school will soon be closed due to poor performance, Marge holds a hearing for ideas to save it. Music teacher Dewey Largo contacts the reclusive author Constance Clavinger, who wrote the beloved children's book The Plucky Little Goat, to come to the school's book fair to read its long-awaited sequel for the first time.

As Marge is about to go to the airport to pick up Constance, she is called to the book fair to amend issues people have with the books present. She tells her husband Homer to pick Constance up instead. He agrees, and finds her drunk at the airport bar. As Homer drives Constance to the fair, they stop at an outlet mall to replace clothes she vomited on, but accidentally shoplift. Constance and Homer are thrown into jail, but soon escape with help from their cellmate, who steals Homer's car. Because Constance's manuscript was in the car, they follow it using a tracking app. Homer rescues the manuscript while the car is being crushed. Homer is shocked to read the manuscript and find a dark story about the goat being murdered. Constance confesses to being disillusioned from fans constantly praising her, since her husband had an affair with a woman with a Plucky tattoo, and wants to ruin children's love of the book.

Constance soon enlists the help of a reporter with a traffic helicopter to get her to the fair. To stop her, Homer causes a traffic pile-up to distract them. Constance jumps out of the helicopter and Homer chases her until he suffers a concussion, experiencing chasing Constance as a children's book cartoon until he arrives at the school. At the fair, Constance begins to read her book despite Homer's protests. However, she sees how happy all the fans are to hear the story. She changes the story to be about the goat and a hippopotamus going on an adventure together, learning that the innocence of children is worth saving.

== Production ==
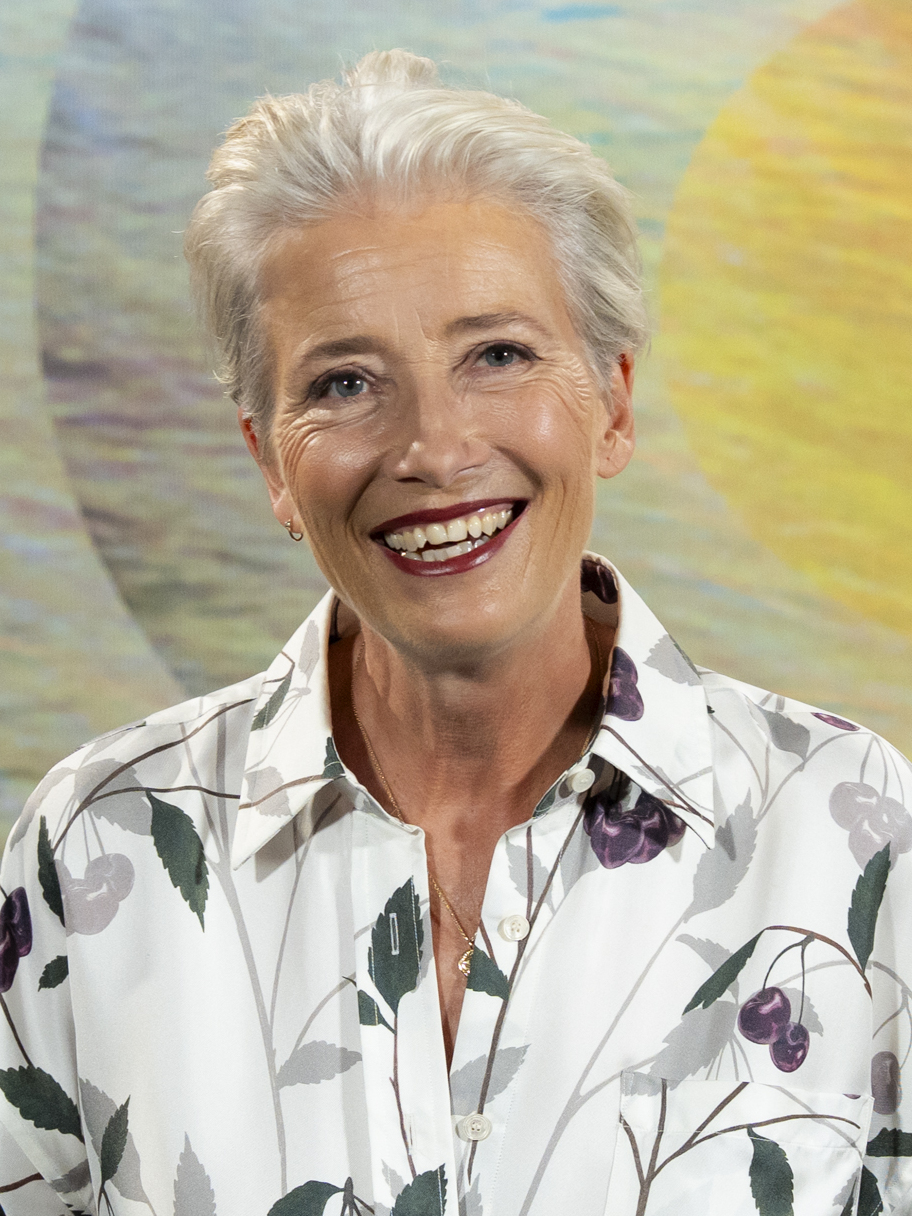
Emma Thompson guest starred in the episode as author Constance Clavinger.

"The Children's Book Job" was written by Dan Vebber and directed by Matthew Nastuk. The plot of the episode is a parody of the 2010 film Get Him to the Greek, although it has also been likened to the 1987 comedy Planes, Trains and Automobiles. Executive producer Mike Price conceived the episode's plot, as a "mild-mannered person has to get crazy person from 'Point A' to 'Point B' kind of story".

In early September 2026, it was confirmed that Emma Thompson would guest star in the premiere as a then-unnamed children's book author. Her character, Constance Clavinger, is a parody of Lucy Cousins, the author of the Maisy book series. Writing the character for a guest actor of big importance to play it, they decided Thompson was the best candidate; with this, they chose to purposely center the story around Thompson and not Homer, having him instead act as a vessel for her character to work. Colin Jost makes a guest appearance as himself, reading his own children's book to Springfield Elementary.

Showrunner Matt Selman called the episode "high-concept", and praised Thompson's performance as Constance. The plot of the episode came from the writing staff's desire to do a parody of children's books, particularly their art. The style of children's books, such as The Very Hungry Caterpillar, was parodied, and done so in the same art style of the show, which Selman noted as a highlight of getting to work on the show. He also felt it was reflective of the Generation X-heavy writing staff, and their attitudes towards the kinds of books they read as children, which is reflected in what it parodies. The sequence at the end where Homer is drawn in the style of various children's book was the "genesis" of the episode, and what they were planning to build the narrative up to from the start. Vebber was well acquainted with famous children's books and their styles, and so he helped to decide which would be given a tribute in the sequence. It was intended to be longer, but the crew found they were running out of airtime to include all the references, and so some were delegated to quick background gags, such as Principal Skinner dressed as Captain Underpants.

== Reception ==
"The Children's Book Job" premiered on Fox Network at 8:00 p.m. ET on September 27, 2026. In the United States, the episode was watched by a total of 1.03 million viewers during its original broadcast. It recorded a 0.23% audience share among adults aged 18 to 49, meaning it was watched by 0.23% of all households in that demographic. This represented a drop in viewership compared to the previous episode, "Homer? A Cracker Bro?", which had achieved a 0.29% rating and drawn 1.14 million viewers.

Jesse Schedeen of IGN gave it a score of 6, noting that it "offers nothing particularly remarkable to celebrate the start of the new season." He praised the ending as "heartwarming," highlighting that "Homer manages to move Constance and convince her not to ruin her life's work." He concluded by stating that "Season 38 of The Simpsons gets off to an acceptable, albeit rather low-key, start." John Schwarz of Bubbleblabber gave the episode a 9 out of 10. He like the relationship between Homer and Constance, and the episode's honor to children's books.

Alex Reif of Laughing Place highlighted the performance by Emma Thompson. He also like the running gag of the word "sudge" and the theme of people's perceptions. Marisa Roffman of Give Me My Remote liked the scenes at locations not normally appearing on the show. She also highlighted the animation style of the dream sequence.
