= Testing 1-2-3 (The Simpsons) =

2026 episode of The Simpsons

- The Simpsons episode
- Episode no.: Season 38; Episode 5
- Directed by: Matthew Faughnan
- Written by: J. Stewart Burns
- Production code: 37ABF12
- Original air date: November 1, 2026

Guest appearances
- Rachel Bloom as Annette; Rosalie Chiang as Hubert Wong

Episode chronology
| ← Previous "Treehouse of Horror XXXVII" | Next → "The Kosmic Kruiser" |
- The Simpsons season 38

"Testing 1-2-3" is the fifth episode of the thirty-eighth season of the American animated television series The Simpsons, and the 814th episode overall. It aired in the United States on Fox on November 1, 2026. The episode was written by J. Stewart Burns and directed by Matthew Faughnan.

In the episode, Lisa gets tested for neurodiversity when she sees someone else getting extra time on a test. Rachel Bloom and Rosalie Chiang guest-starred. The episode received mixed reviews.

== Plot ==
While Lisa is being distracted by her classmates while taking a standardized test, she notices Hubert Wong taking the test in an isolated room with extra time because of his unique needs. Wanting fair accommodations, she has herself assessed by Annette.

=== Into the Neurodiverse ===
The first assessment asks her about mental fixations. She recalls a time in the school cafeteria when a fire starts. She alerts Principal Skinner, who ignores her while working on the school budget, so she puts it out herself. Superintendent Chalmers wants him to explain himself to the school board. Instead, the board approves Skinner's budget and promotes him to be principal at Springfield High School. He has difficulty adjusting to his new environment. He sends students to detention as a familiar way of punishing them. The students bond in detention, but Skinner expected them to sit quietly and be unhappy. Seeing how the students changed, Skinner refuses to do the same and returns to Springfield Elementary.

=== Attention Deficit Homer Disorder ===
The second assessment asks her about distractions. She recalls a time when Homer takes the family out for sandwiches. Marge needs to distract Homer to keep him calm while waiting in line. He has a hard time deciding which sandwich he wants and decides to get a turkey leg from the Renaissance Faire across the street. There, Homer engages in dangerous behavior while Marge and Lisa protect him. When Marge, Bart, and Lisa are placed in stocks for breaking the rules, Homer tries to rescue them in a flying machine but flies away when he sees sandwiches.

=== The Neatly-Arranged Adventures of O.C.D. Man ===
The third assessment asks her about object arrangement. She recalls a time when Comic Book Guy drives her away from his store for placing a comic book crookedly on a shelf. He kicks out children for moving his wares. Kumiko wants to rearrange the store to improve sales. Comic Book Guy secretly thinks that would remove the force field protecting the store. When Kumiko rearranges things without permission, he believes a meteor will strike the store. Asking to reset the store, Kumiko agrees but believes a tsunami will hit the store. Realizing they both suffer from obsessive-compulsive disorder, Comic Book Guy and Kumiko grow closer.

Having fallen asleep, Lisa dreams about the townsfolk singing about their neurodiversity.

=== Finale ===
When Lisa awakened, her assessment test is taken away by Annette despite her plea for extra time.

During the credits, Lisa learns about some of Annette's history.

== Production ==
Rachel Bloom reprised her role as Annette. Bloom first appeared in this role in the twenty-ninth season episode "Springfield Splendor."

== Reception ==
"Testing 1-2-3" premiered on Fox Network at 8:00 p.m. ET on November 1, 2026. In the United States, the episode was watched by a total of 0.96 million viewers during its original broadcast. It recorded a 0.27% audience share among adults aged 18 to 49, meaning that it was watched by 0.27% of all households within that demographic. This represented a decline in viewership compared to the previous episode, "Treehouse of Horror XXXVII," which earned a 1.28% rating and drew 4.11 million viewers.

Marcus Gibson of Bubbleblabber gave the episode a 9 out of 10. He liked how the episode explored neurodiversity through the examination of Simpsons characters. Because Gibson was diagnosed with autism, he was able to identify with the symptoms shown in the episode. Alex Reif of Laughing Place did not like the episode. He thought Lisa's character did not fit the characteristics of a neurodiverse person and thought the jokes and humor did not make up for the premise. Marisa Roffman of Give Me My Remote thought the characterizations of the characters shown made sense. She also felt sorry for Marge for needing to handle Homer.
