= Benny Mathews =

American cinematographer

Benny Mathews (born June 29, 1970) is an international director who directed the films Dude, Where's the Party? (2003) Santeria (2006), and Geeta in Paridise (2009). He has also directed numerous commercials and music videos for acts including Bone Thugs-n-Harmony, and Houston hip-hop artists such as Scarface and Bun B., and Pimp C. Pimp C's "Knockin' Doorz Down", earned him a nomination for "Best Video" at the 2007 Ozone Magazine Awards.

== Music videos ==
Year	Artist	Song	Notes
1994	The Blac Monks	Buddha Nature	
1994	Fesu	Ya Don’t Stop	
1999	SPM	High So High	
1999	Chlorine	Way Out	
2000	TELA, featuring PIMP C	Bye Bye Hater	
2000	Willie D featuring PIMP C	Freaky Deaky	
2001	UGK	Wood Wheel	
2001	SPM	You Know My Name	
2001	SPM and Baby Bash	Oh My My	
2001	Dorasel	The Beast	
2003	Scarface	Recognize	
2003	Dirty	That’s why I	
2004	Z-Ro	I Hate You	
2004	NB Ridaz	So Fly So Cool	
2005	Geto Boys	I Tried	
2005	Geto Boys	Yes Yes Ya’ll	
2005	Baby Bash	Ménage-a-Trios	
2005	BUN B	Draped Up and Dripped Out	
2005	Scarface	G Code	
2006	BUN B featuring Lil’ Keke	Draped Up and Dripped out Remix	
2006	NB Ridaz	Runaway	
2006	NB Ridaz	All My Life	
2006	Scarface, Young Malice and Will Hen	I’ma	
2007	Bone Thugs	Listen	
2007	trin-i-tee 5:7	Get Away	
2007	Scarface, featuring Trey Songz	Girl Ya know	
2007	Bone Thugs	Make My Day	
2008	MC Magic	Girl I Love You	
2007	Lil Will	Me Dougie	
2011	PIMP C featuring Bun B, Trey, Slim Thug and Bun B	Knocking Doors Down	
2018	Carley Coy	When The Lights Go Out	
