= Jenny Nicholson =

American video essayist

- Occupations: Video essayist; YouTuber
- Years active: 2011–present

YouTube information
- Channel: JennyNicholson
- Genres: Film criticism, video essay
- Subscribers: 1.38 million
- Views: 224.5 million
- Last updated: August 19, 2026

Jenny Nicholson is an American video essayist and YouTuber. Her videos are often longform reviews of media or documentary-style videos about theme parks. Nicholson's videos include costumes and humor, and have twice been nominated for the Hugo Award for Best Related Work.

== YouTube career ==
Nicholson posted her first videos in 2011. Nicholson created Friendship Is Witchcraft, a parody dubbing of My Little Pony: Friendship is Magic, under the pseudonym "Sherclop Pones". The videos on her main channel were slightly more than a minute long. Her videos increased in length over time, with her first 30-minute video (I hate The Greatest Showman more every moment) being posted in 2018. In 2018, Nicholson also hosted Millennial Falcon on the Screen Junkies channel, a talk show that discussed Star Wars.

In 2017, Boing Boing praised the humour in Nicholson's ASMR video titled Top 10 Reasons I Won't Do ASMR. In 2018, The Washington Post recommended Nicholson's Suicide Squad Sales Pitch video, amongst other videos by Nicholson, describing it as her 'breakout hit'. As of July 2026 the video has 3.3 million views.

As of 2021, Nicholson had over 13,000 patrons each paying her at least $1 a month. In the same year, Nicholson posted an over two hour long video titled THE Vampire Diaries Video which garnered media attention to her entire body of works, notably an article by the International Policy Digest which praised her for authenticity and passion on the topics she covers, and highlighting her "script doctor" series where she performs humorous reviews of movies and media from the point of view of "fixing" it. The article also highlights her collaborative work with other YouTubers, such as her cameos in Lindsay Ellis's videos. The Vampire Diaries video also featured in various recommendation lists of 2022.

Nicholson's video The Last Bronycon: A Fandom Autopsy was a finalist at the 2021 Hugo Award for Best Related Work.

In 2022, Nicholson released a documentary on the now-closed Evermore theme park in Pleasant Grove, Utah titled Evermore: The Theme Park That Wasn't. The video & Nicholson were referenced in the parody musical, Everfolk, which premiered at the 2025 Orlando Fringe Festival. After posting The Church Play Cinematic Universe, Nicholson revealed that she had received a "bad faith" copyright claim, impacting her channel's ability to earn income.

Nicholson has received media attention for her backlog of long videos, a format that has become increasingly popular, with many citing her as a pioneer of the longform video essay genre on YouTube.

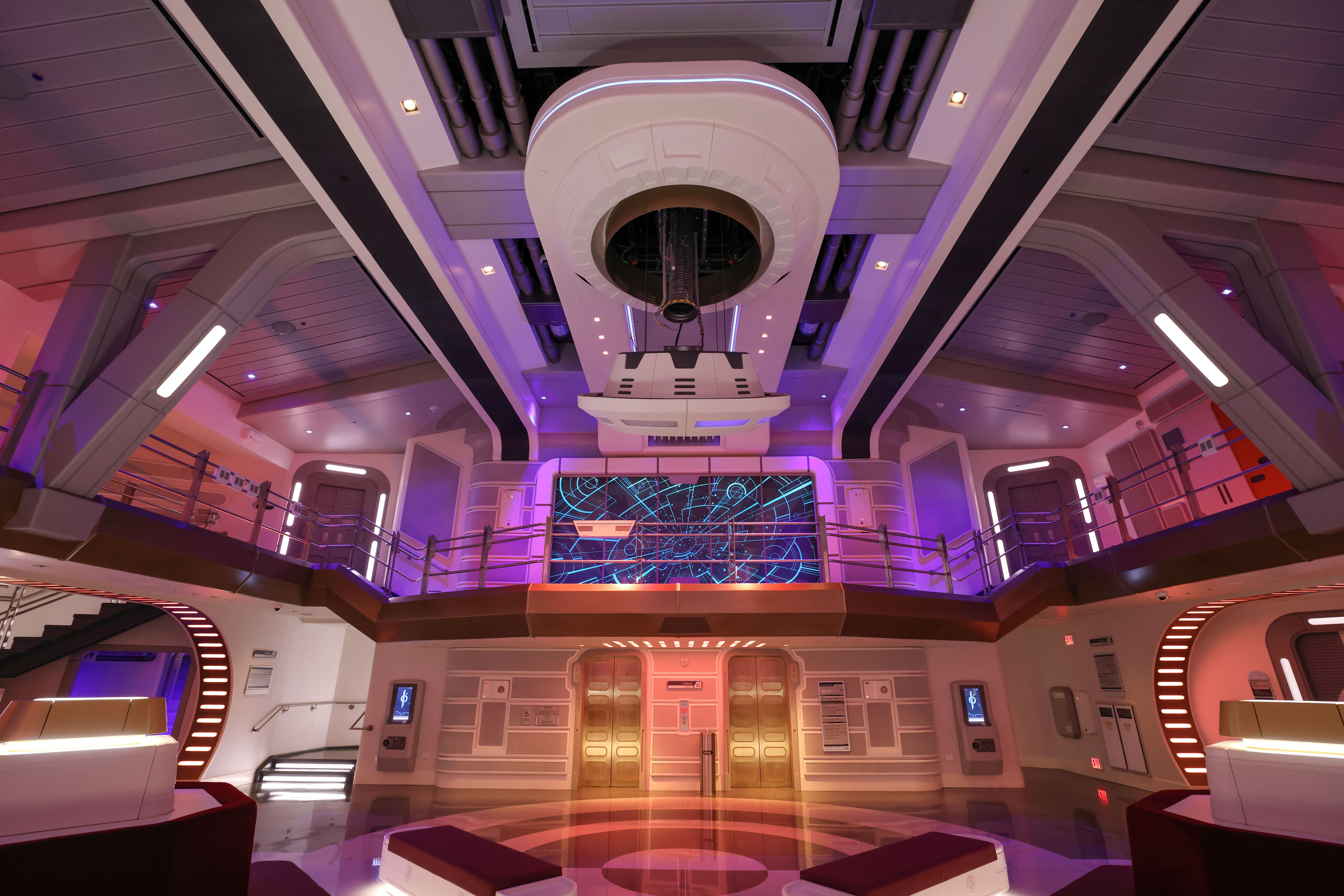
Nicholson's review of Star Wars: Galactic Starcruiser was acclaimed by audiences and earned her a second Hugo nomination for Best Related Work

On May 19, 2024, after two years of work, Jenny Nicholson posted The Spectacular Failure of the Star Wars Hotel, a four-hour and five minute long review of Star Wars: Galactic Starcruiser. The video garnered over 3 million views after 3 days. The Independent praised her as having made "more effort into her research than most postgrads do their dissertations". The video also received pushback from a staff member that worked at the hotel, as well as from Disney fans. Others claiming to be former Disney employees agreed with Nicholson's assessment of the hotel and its failings. Some sources report that Nicholson claimed that Disney filed a copyright claim against her video due to the music playing in one of the clips she included in her videos, preventing her from earning AdSense money on the video for a period of time. In 2025, the video was nominated as a finalist for the Hugo Award for Best Related Work, marking Nicholson's second Hugo nomination. The video was named CNN's Best epic film of 2024, and included amongst Vanity Fair's Best TV Shows of 2024 list. In the same year, Nicholson's There's something wrong with Hallmark's youtube channel was also included in one of The Guardian's 10 funniest things I have ever seen (on the internet) lists.

In November 2026, Nicholson voiced the character of KIT-10, as a special guest in the The Simpsons season 38 episode "The Kosmic Kruiser", which parodies the closure of Galactic Starcruiser.

== Awards and nominations ==
Year	Award	Category	Nominated works	Result
2021	Hugo Award	Best Related Work	The Last Bronycon: a fandom autopsy	Finalist
2025	Hugo Award	Best Related Work	The Spectacular Failure of the Star Wars Hotel	Finalist

== Personal life ==
Nicholson has worked for Disneyland in more than one capacity, including at the petting zoo and the tour department.
