= Dude, Where's the Party? =

- Dude, Where's the Party? DVD cover
- Directed by: Benny Mathews
- Screenplay by: Benny Mathews; Soham Mehta; Rikesh Patel; Sunil Thakkar
- Story by: Sunil Thakkar
- Produced by: Sunil Thakkar
- Starring: Kal Penn; Sunil Malhotra; Prem Shah; Tina Cherian; Serena Varghese; Sunil Thakkar; Mousami Dave
- Cinematography: Anthony Fennel
- Edited by: Shimit Amin
- Music by: Shimit Amin; Yogi Goyal
- Distributed by: Music Masala Films
- Release date: May 28, 2003
- Running time: 110 minutes
- Country: United States
- Language: English

Dude, Where's the Party?, alternatively titled Where's the Party Yaar?, is a 2003 film directed by Benny Mathews. It stars Kal Penn and Sunil Malhotra. It is a comedy film that focuses mainly on the Indian American experience.

== Plot ==
Harishkumar Satishkumar Patel (Sunil Malhotra) is a geeky student from a small village in Gujarat, India who is attending the University of Houston, while living with his uncle (his father's best friend). His uncle, Dr. Bakshi, has an American-born son who is Hari's age, Mohan Bakshi (Kal Penn). Mohan, known as Mo, is a very popular Indian student at UH. He shows Hari around the college but then stays away from him because of Hari's nerdy ways.

Hari, meanwhile, is overly excited because of an astrological prediction that was made by a holy man. The famous astrologer told Hari that he'll meet his Sapno Ki Raani (the girl of his dreams) in America and her name will begin with alphabet "P". Hari then meets Priya (Tina Cherian), a Malayali studying fashion, and falls in love with her. In the meanwhile, Mo falls in love with Janvi Valia (Serena Varghese), a Punjabi girl, but things don't go as planned when Mo invites Janvi to a party. In the film's conclusion, Mo learns important things about his culture, and Hari overcomes his challenges. This film is primarily a comedic portrayal of young Indian Americans going through life.

== Cast ==
- Kal Penn as Mohan Bakshi
- Sunil Malhotra as Harishkumar Satishkumar Patel
- Prem Shah as Ramesh "Ray" Kumar
- Tina Cherian as Supriya Varghese:
- Serena Varghese as Janvi Valia
- Sunil Thakkar as Shyam Sunder Balabhadrapatramukhi
- Mousami Dave as Poonam Mehta
- Jiten Kothari as Jiten Kothari

== Reception ==
The movie received positive reviews from critics.
