= Star Wars: Galactic Starcruiser =

Hotel at Walt Disney World (2022–23)

Coordinates: 28.351389°N 81.561111°W

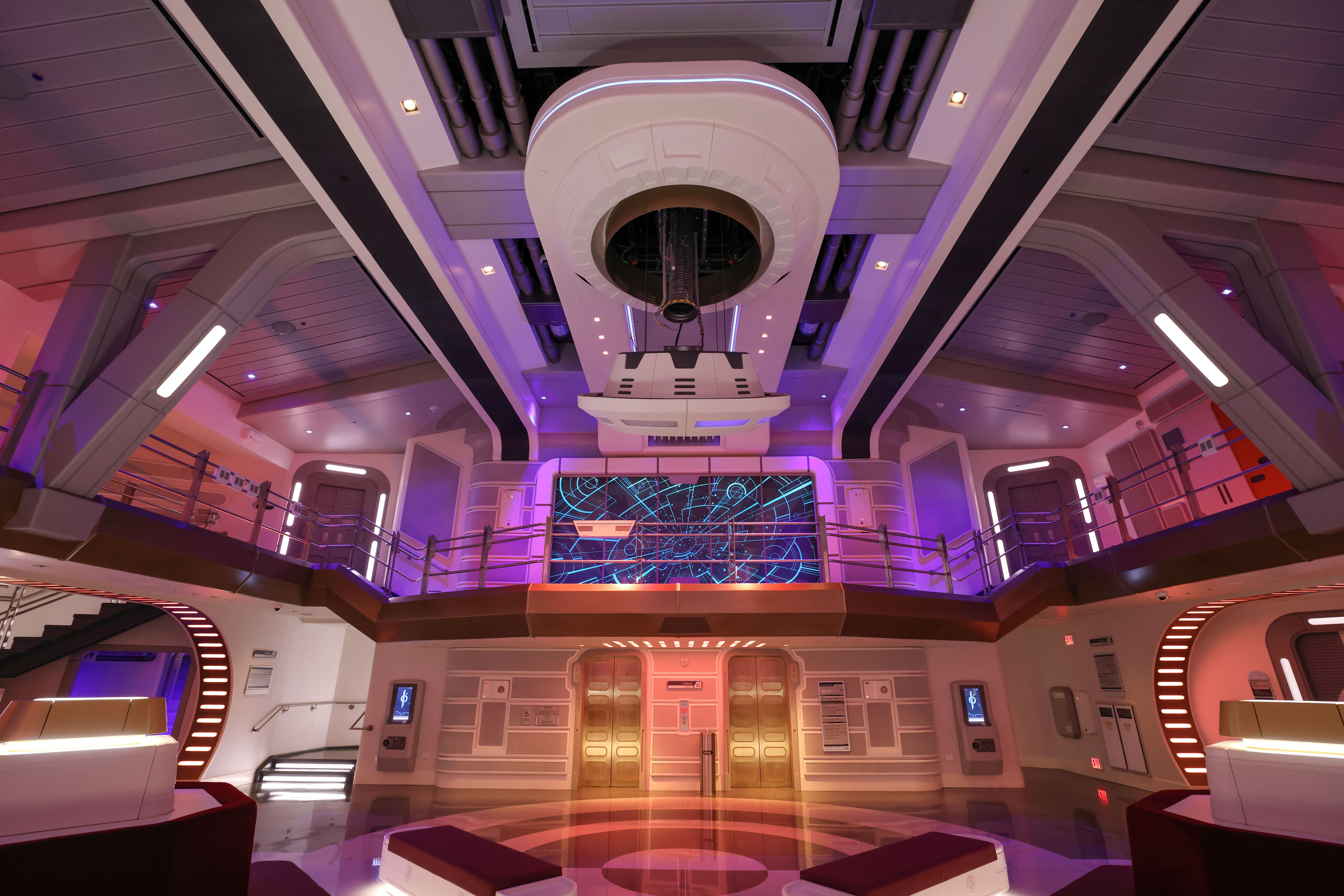
- Main atrium of the Star Wars: Galactic Starcruiser

General information
- Type: Resort
- Location: Epcot Resort Area
- Opened: March 1, 2022
- Closed: September 30, 2023
- Operator: Disney Parks, Experiences and Products

Other information
- Number of rooms: 100

Website
- Official website at the Wayback Machine (archived October 26, 2020)

Star Wars: Galactic Starcruiser was a live action role-playing hotel experience operated by the Walt Disney Company from March 1, 2022, until its closure on September 30, 2023. It simulated a cruise in outer space in the Star Wars galaxy and was located in a building located next to Disney's Hollywood Studios, in the Epcot Resort Area of the Walt Disney World Resort in Bay Lake, Florida. It was thematically linked to the Star Wars: Galaxy's Edge area in Disney's Hollywood Studios.

== History ==
In April 2017, Disney hired the website Swagbucks to survey its visitors to gauge interest in a possible Star Wars-themed hotel with a visitor experience based on the Star Wars storyline. Plans for the Star Wars hotel were announced at D23 Expo 2017 in Anaheim, California. At D23 Expo 2019, it was revealed that the hotel would be called the Halcyon and would be a two-night immersive experience in which all guests arrive and depart together, similar to a cruise line.

The 2021 opening of the Star Wars hotel was delayed to March 1, 2022, by the COVID-19 pandemic.

In 2017, Disney's head of Parks and Resorts, Bob Chapek, said the Star Wars hotel would be the company's "most experiential concept ever" and a "100% immersive" experience that "will culminate in a unique journey for every person who visits". Planned features included creatures and droids acting as hotel staff; guests wearing Star Wars costumes; and an ability to interact with features of the hotel as if visitors were really in the Star Wars universe. Marketing materials suggested that visitors would participate in lightsaber training and duels (an extension of the Jedi Training Academy in Disney's Hollywood Studios); explore and pilot Star Wars spacecraft; and go on "secret missions" personalized toward the visitors' experience. When the hotel opened, many of these activities were replaced by lightsaber training only and "Bridge Ops" training instead of piloting the ship.

One writer for The Verge called the planned hotel a "Westworld for Star Wars fans", noting the hotel amenities that would facilitate the immersive experience. Mic compared the plans to Disney's Animal Kingdom Lodge and Universal Orlando's Cabana Bay Beach Resort, two hotels with immersive theming. Estimates of the cost to build the hotel varied from $350 million to $1 billion.

=== Closure ===
In May 2023, Disney announced that the Galactic Starcruiser would have its last two-day voyage on September 28 and then close permanently. It closed at 10 a.m. on September 30, 2023. At the JP Morgan Technology, Media & Communications Conference in May 2023, Chairman Josh D'Amaro said that Disney was expecting "about $100–150 million in accelerated depreciation" in the following two fiscal quarters—amounting to $200–300 million total—due to the closure. This number was later revised and confirmed by Interim CFO Kevin Lansberry to be $250 million.

In January 2025, it was reported that the building was being converted to the second office space for Walt Disney Imagineering's upcoming theme park projects, including the Disney Villains-themed land at Magic Kingdom, the Monsters, Inc.-themed land at Disney's Hollywood Studios and the Tropical Americas land at Disney's Animal Kingdom.

== Description ==
Early renderings of the project in 2017 showed that the new hotel would be shaped like a Star Wars starship. Renderings also showed a lobby in the style of a Star Wars spaceship interior. On May 30, 2018, it was announced that the hotel would be located just south of Disney's Hollywood Studios, to the east of World Drive. Valet parking was available for guests arriving in personal vehicles (no self-parking), or guests could use other means, such as ridesharing or taxi services. A driveway connected the Starcruiser's main terminal to the Cast parking lot of Disney's Hollywood Studios.

Guests stays on the ship, named the Halcyon, lasted two days and two nights. The minimum room rate was $4,800 for two people. The guest rooms contained full-size bunk beds and a queen-sized bed; some rooms also had a pull-down to sleep a fifth guest in the style of Star Wars bunkers. The cost included the room, ongoing entertainment, food and drinks (excluding alcoholic beverages), admission and transportation to Hollywood Studios, Lightning Lane passes for the Galaxy's Edge attractions, a quick-service meal credit for Disney's Hollywood Studios, valet parking, and a MagicBand. Guests were able to leave the Starcruiser at any point throughout their stay. Visitors could choose to participate in a specific story line through the Play Disney Parks mobile app.

The Halcyon was described as containing 13 decks, with four being available to passengers: 4, 5, 6, and 7. Deck 4 contained the Crown of Corellia Dining Room, the Lightsaber Training Pod, the Climate Simulator, the Transport Dock to Batuu, the Cargo Hold, the Brig, and the Engineering Room. Deck 6 contained the Atrium, which led to the Bridge, the Sublight Lounge, the Chandrila Collection (souvenir shop), and the Passenger Services' Desk. Decks 4, 5, and 7 hosted the guest cabins. On their second day, guests at the hotel traveled to Star Wars: Galaxy's Edge by a "shuttle-pod transportation system"—a cargo box on a flatbed truck whose interior resembled a shuttle spacecraft. The shuttle-pod terminal in Galaxy's Edge was located next to the First Order ship in Docking Bay 9. The walkway that led to the shuttle-pod is still visible, though unavailable to guests.

The story is connected to Galaxy's Edge, and is set in the same time period between the events of Episode VIII – The Last Jedi and Episode IX – The Rise of Skywalker. It followed the Halcyon crew and passengers as they celebrated the 275th anniversary of the starline. The ship's itinerary coincided with Resistance activity, which caused the First Order to board and investigate. Guests were able to choose which storyline they wanted to participate in: Resistance, Smuggler, or First Order.

Deck 4:

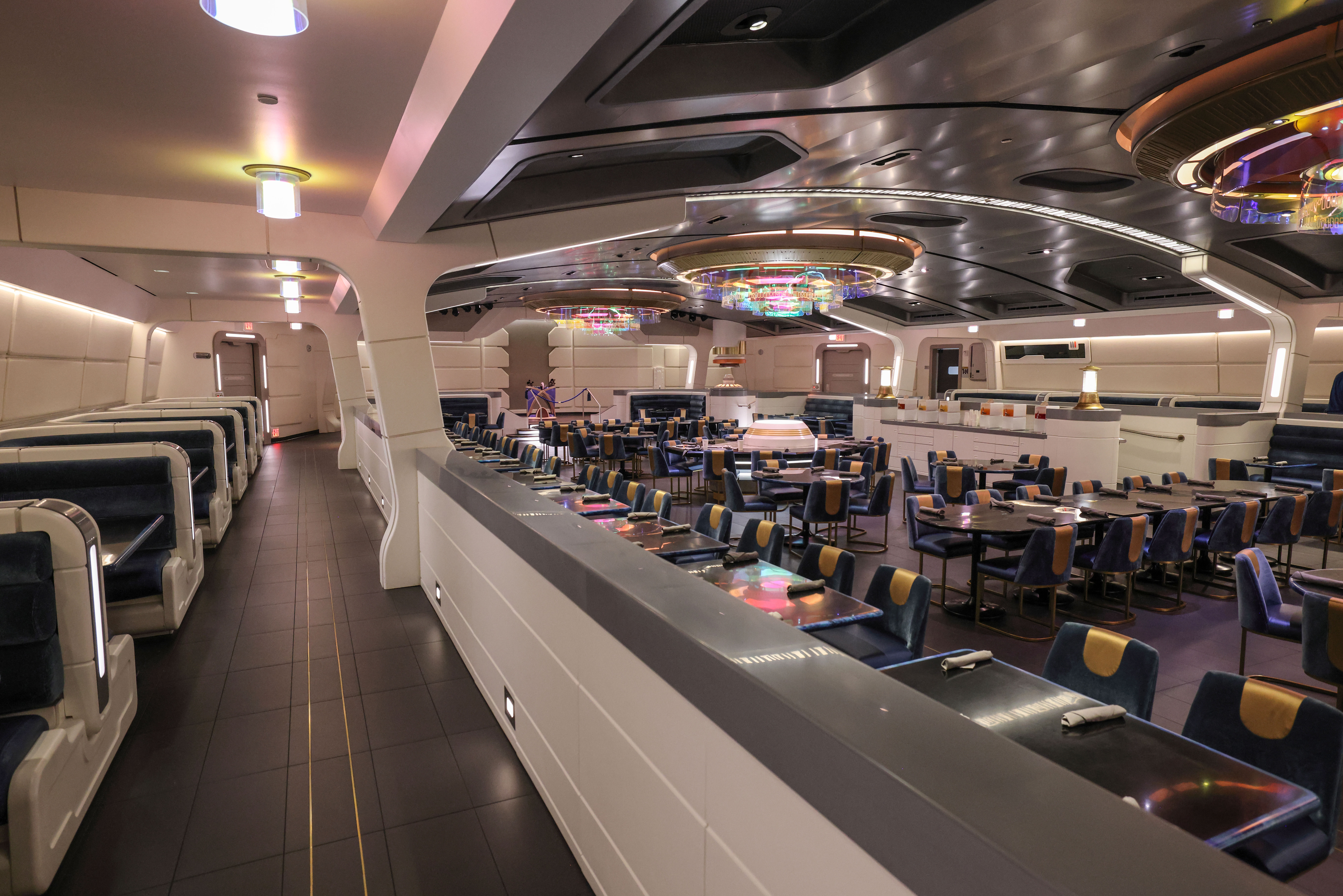
Crown of Corellia Dining Room

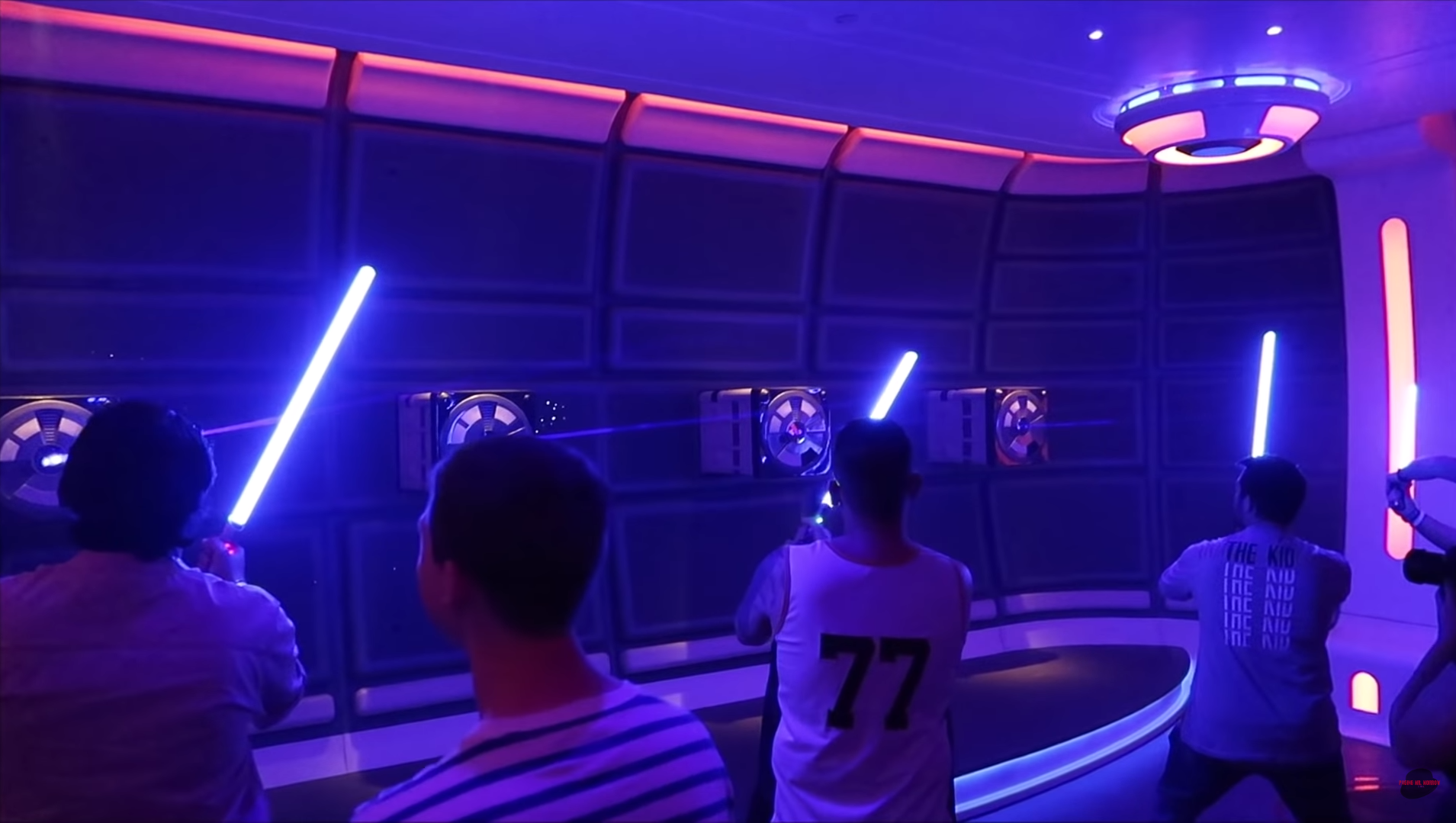
Lightsaber Training

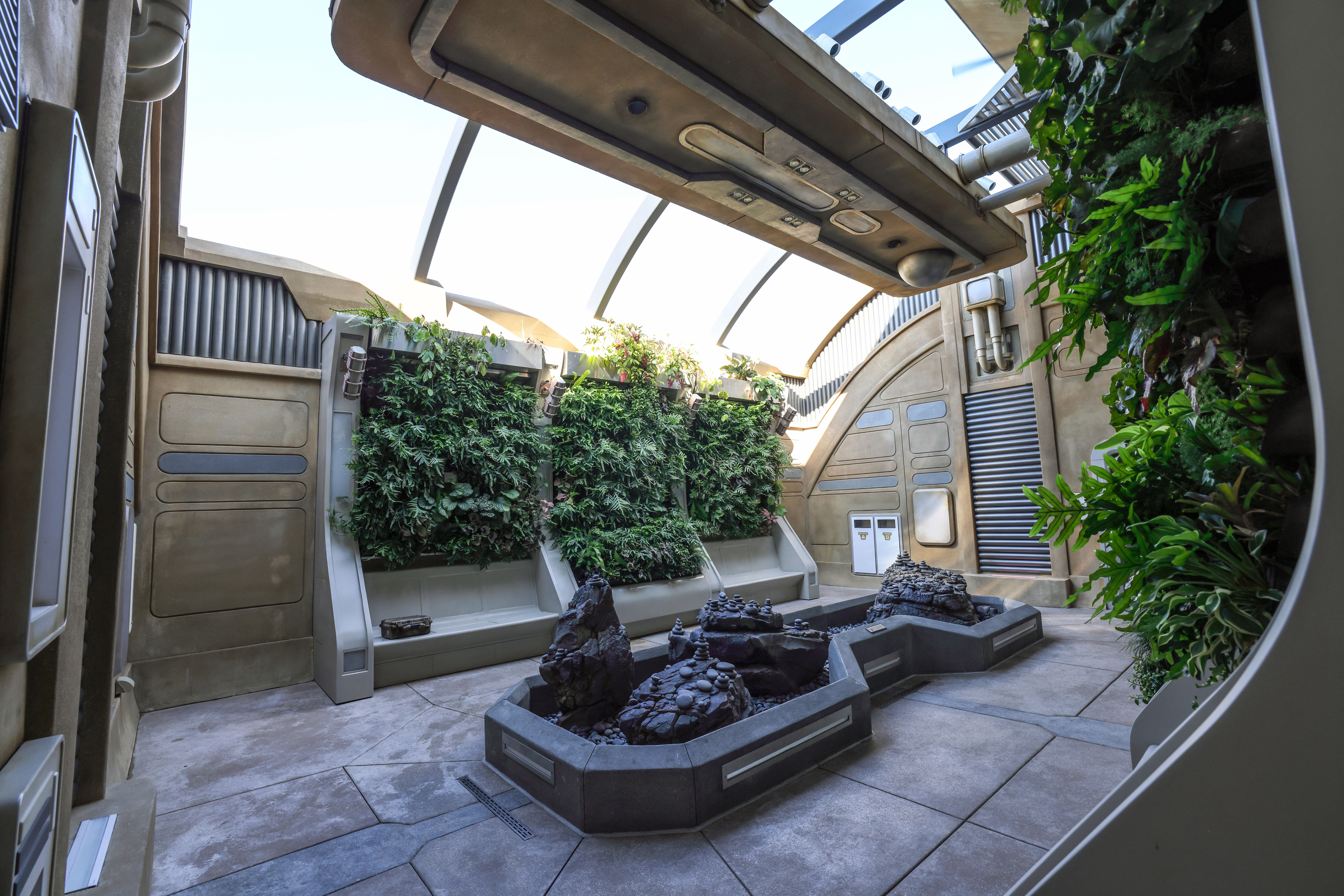
Climate Simulator

Deck 6:

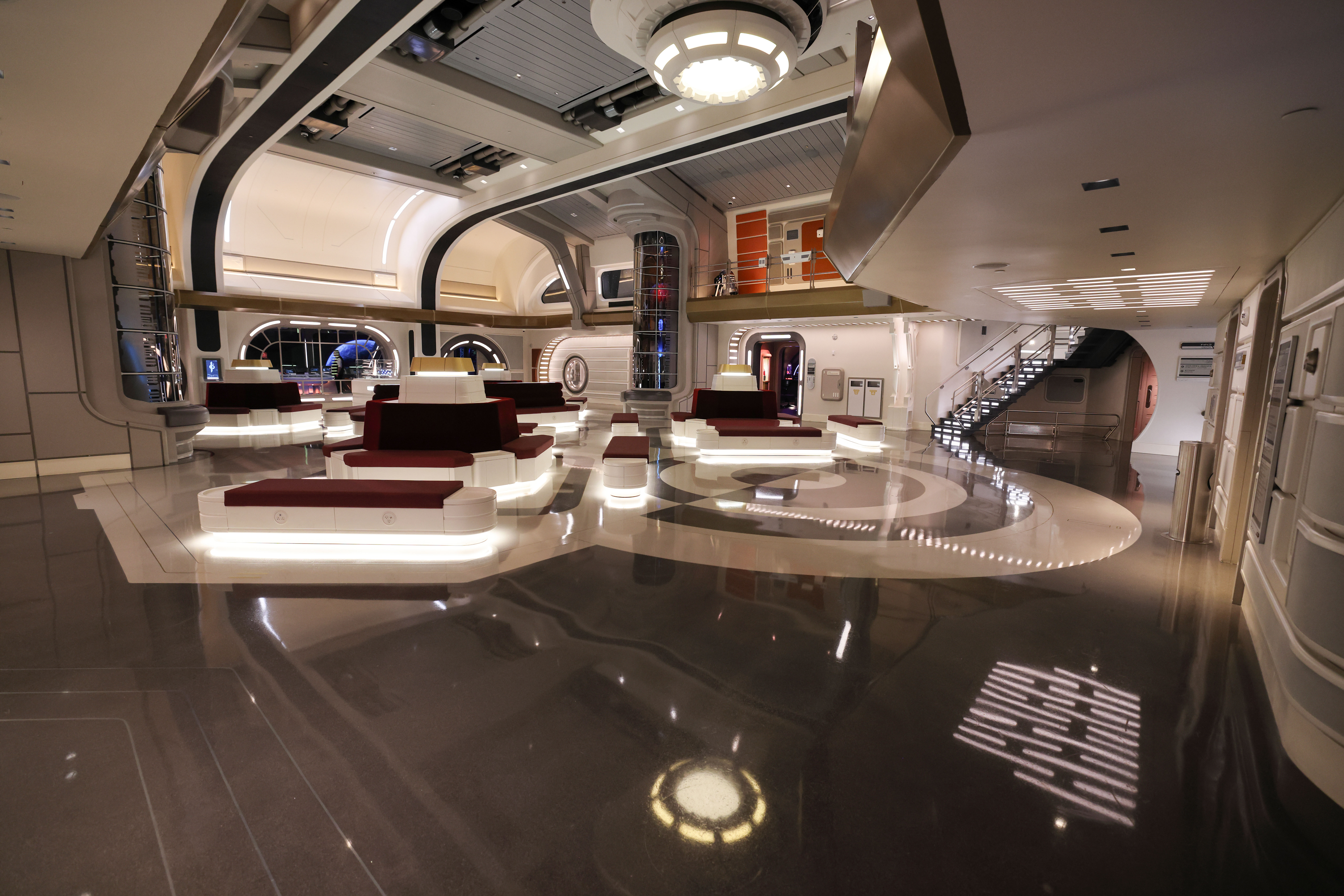
Atrium

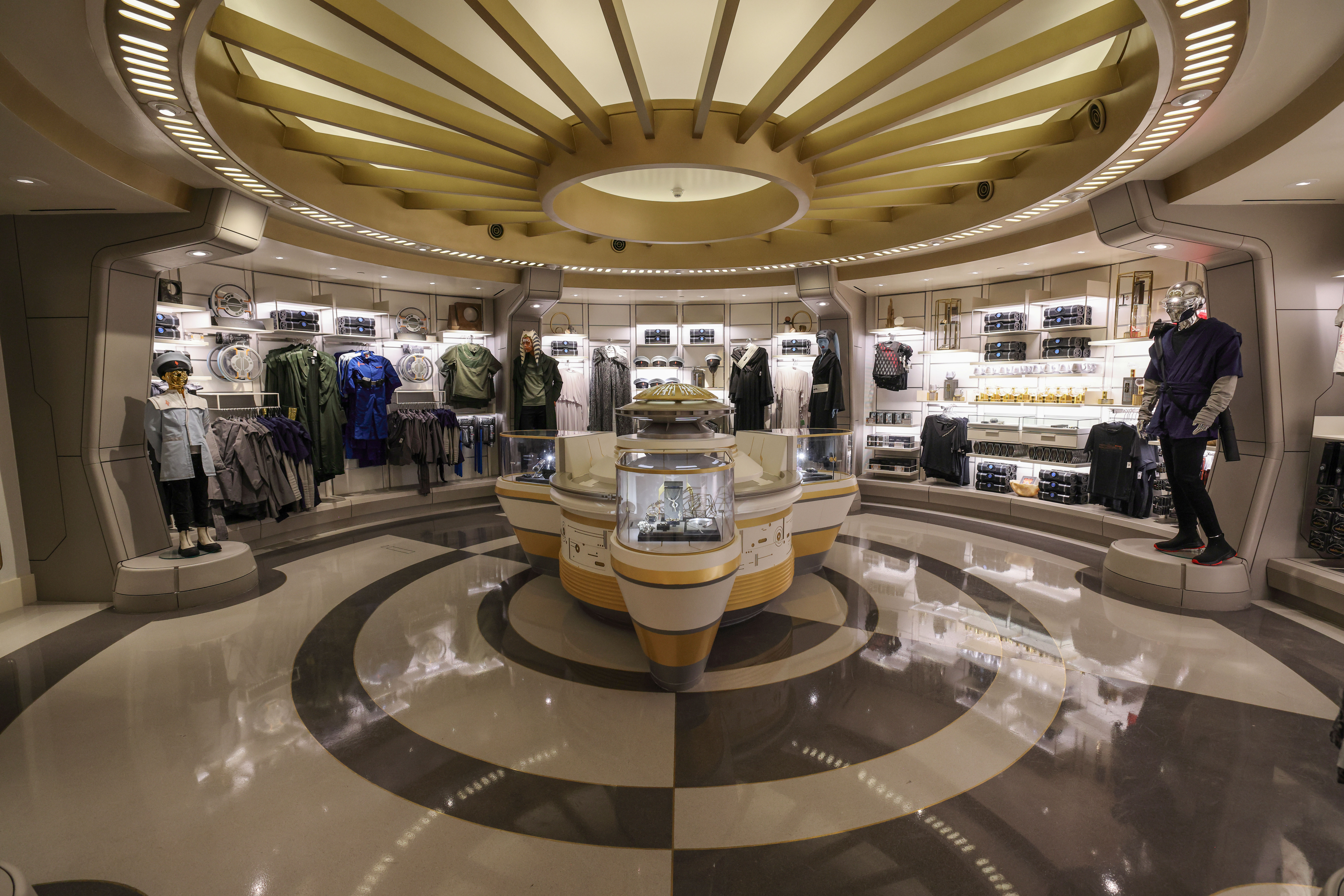
The Chandrila Collection

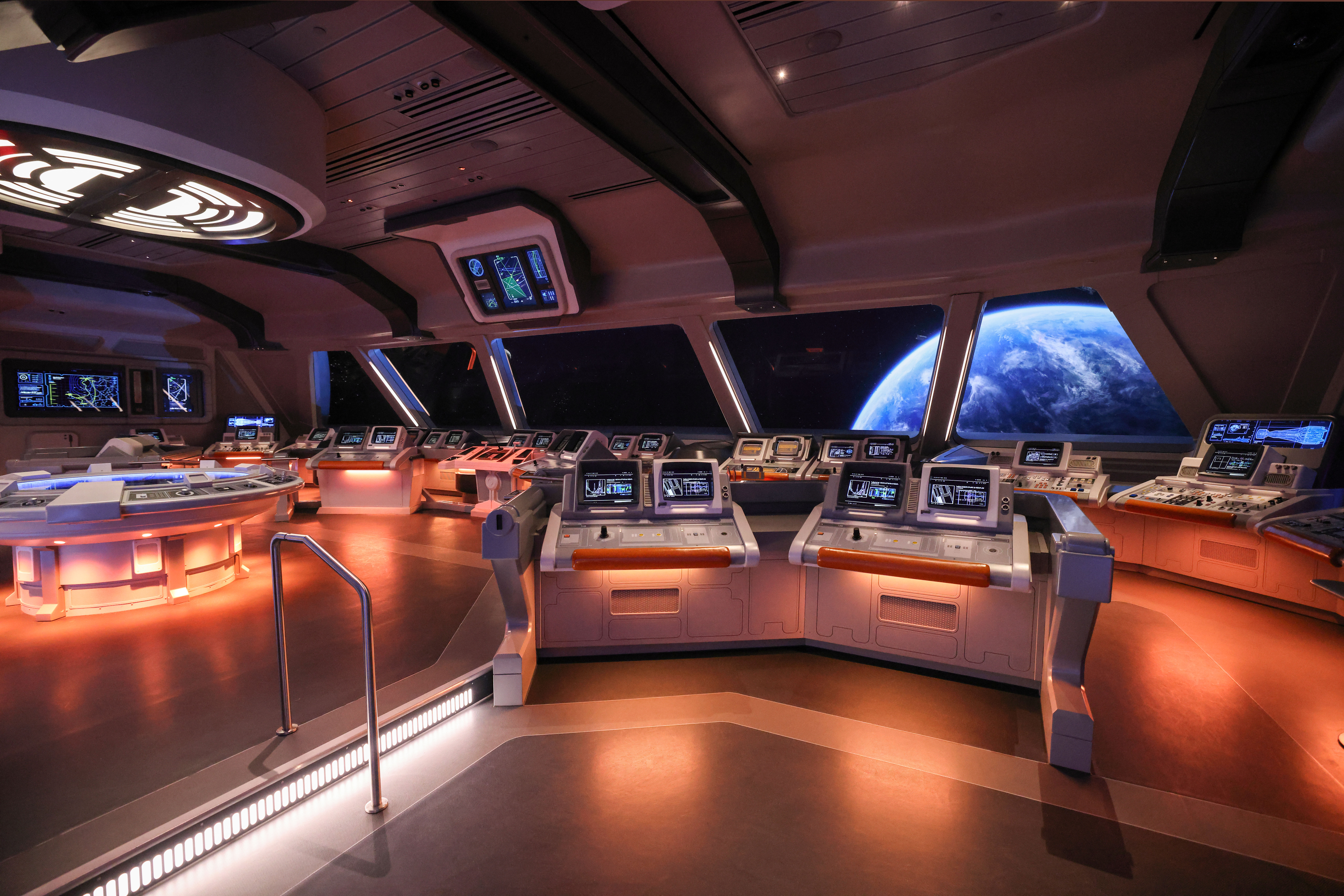
Starcruiser Bridge

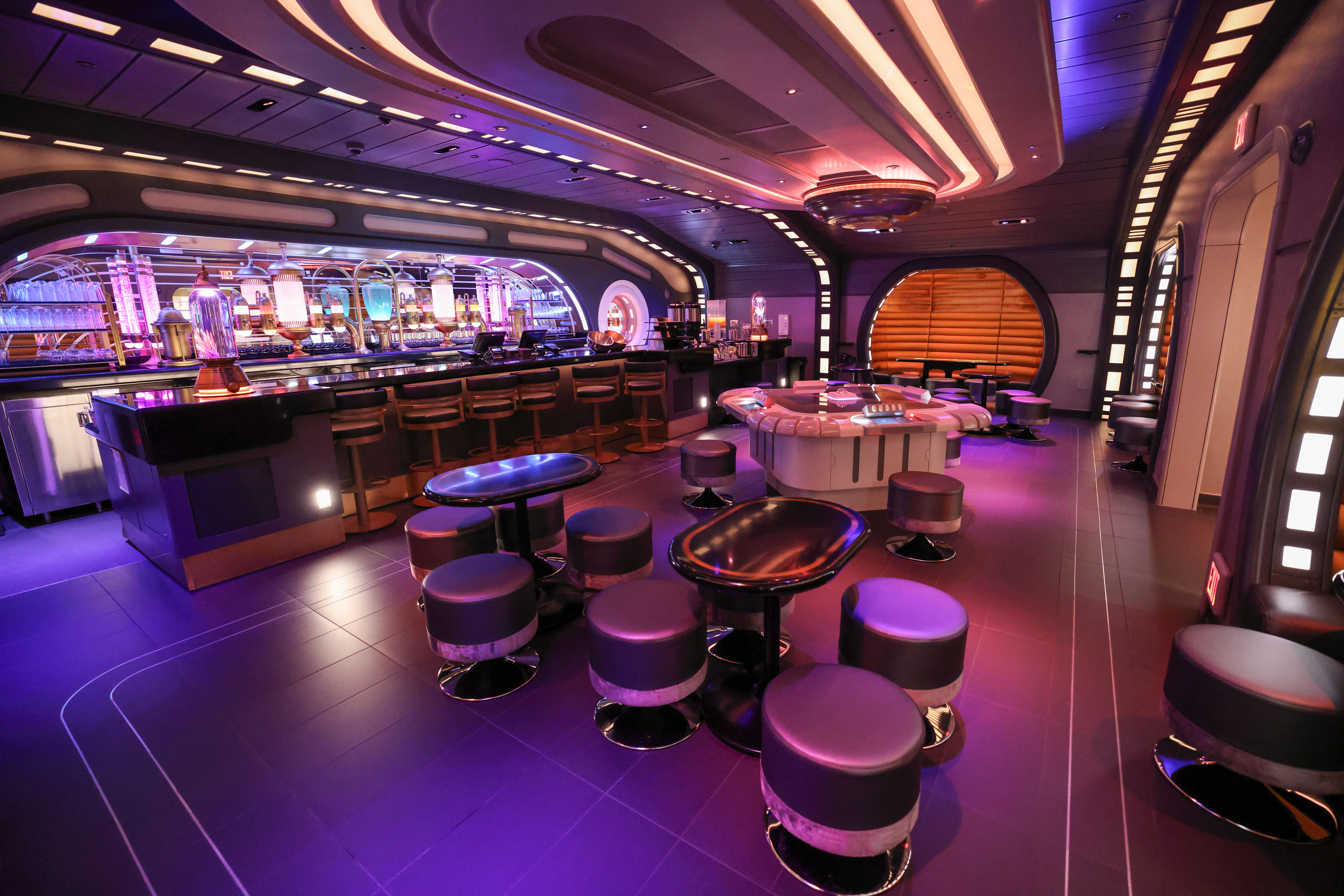
Sublight Lounge

Deck 7:

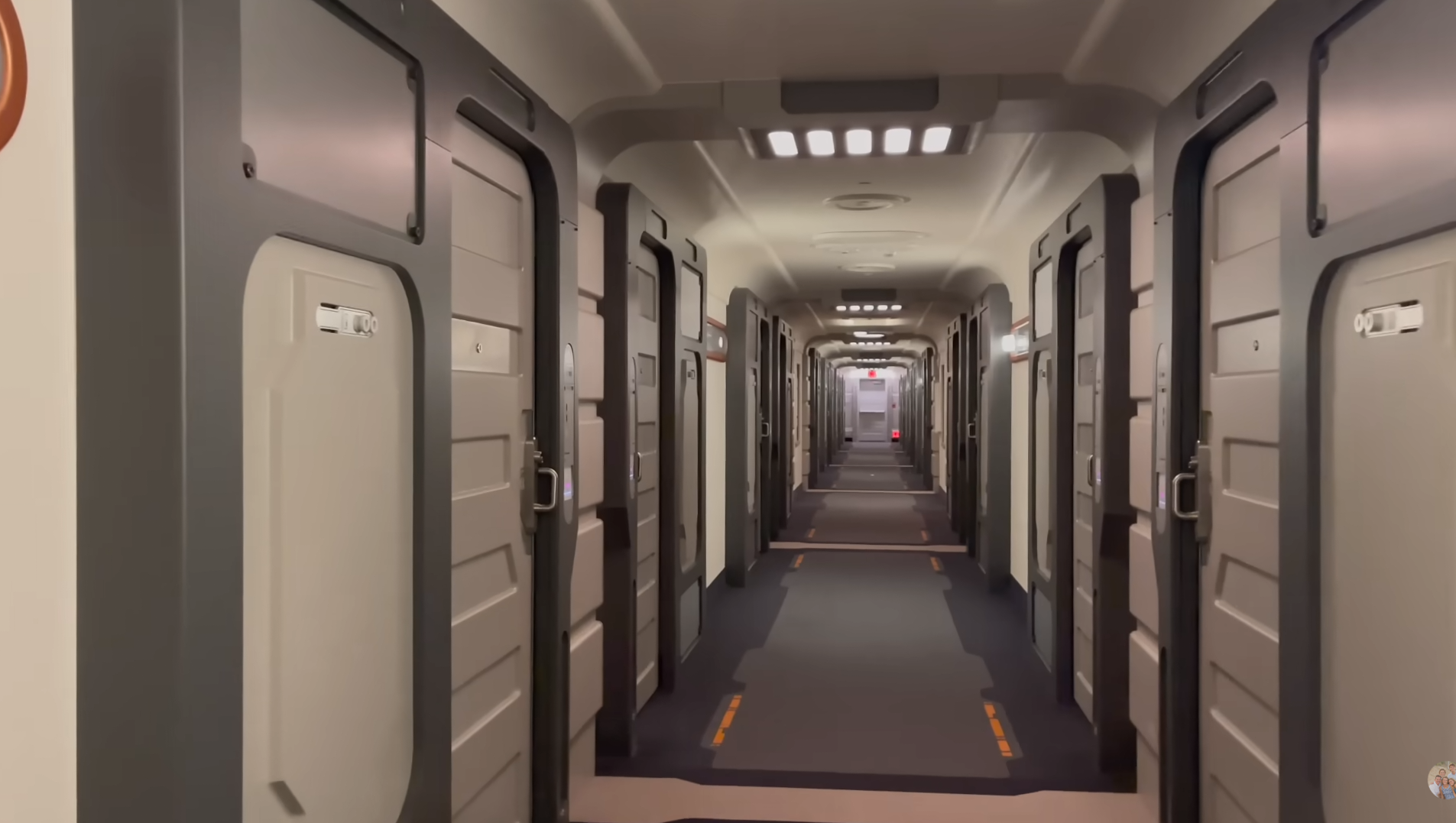
Deck 7 corridor

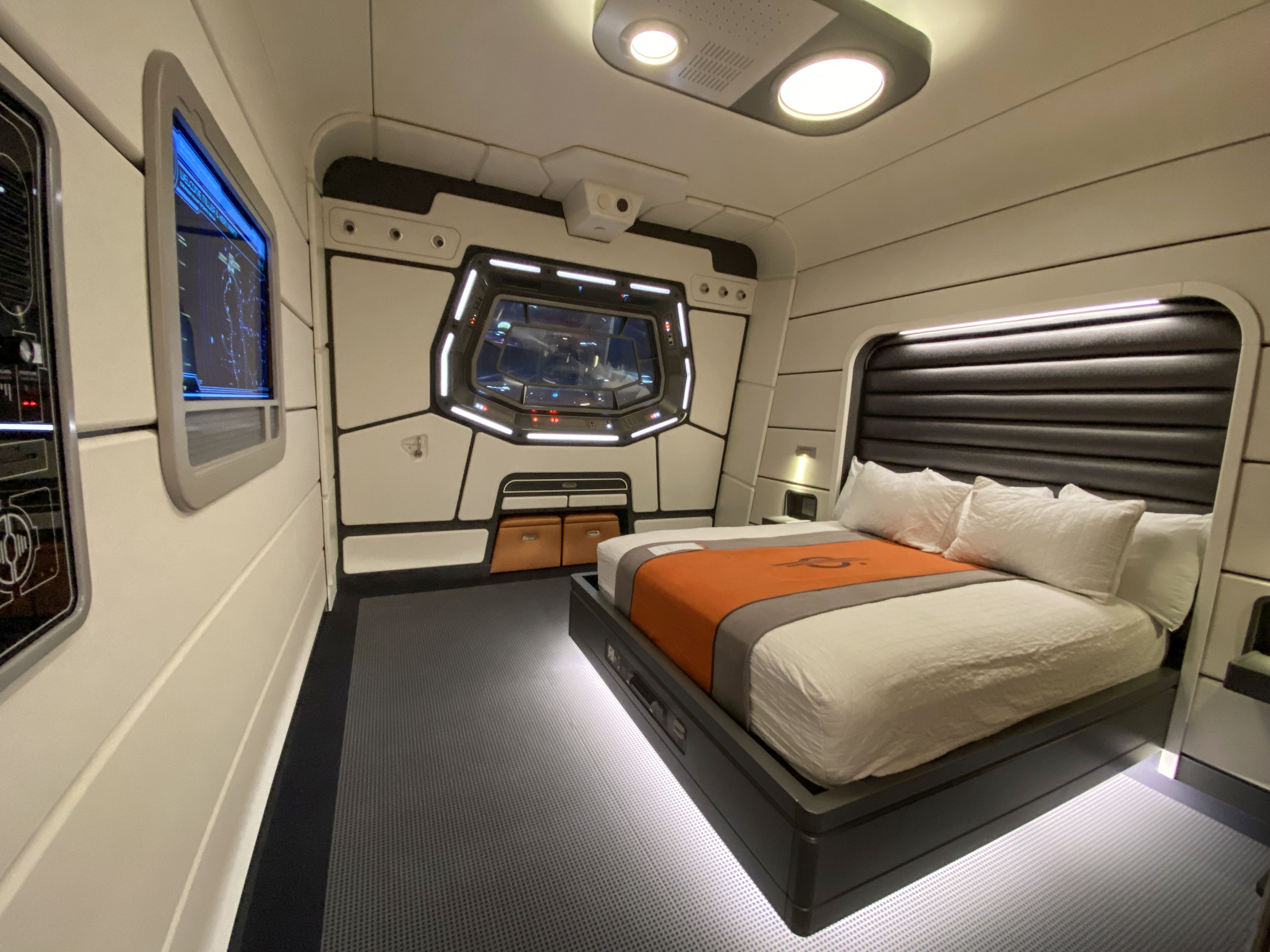
Guestroom

== Reception ==
Early photos of the Halcyon's small, windowless cabins went viral before the hotel opened to the public, with many commentators on Twitter complaining that they were not a suitable luxury accommodation. After the hotel's opening, the high price was criticized. Esquire wrote that "the real villain here is Galactic Starcruiser's Death Star-sized price tag", and that the small rooms did not quite justify the prices. One commentator said its prices had kept many from visiting, while the lone storyline dissuaded guests from visiting twice.

In an article for Polygon, Charlie Hall wrote that despite the facility flaws and the high price point, the Starcruiser was "something of a dream come true for a Star Wars fan". He described the overall story arc as the highlight of the stay, which made the guests "an integral part" of the Star Wars universe. In November 2022, the Galactic Starcruiser won a Thea award from the Themed Entertainment Association for outstanding achievement in brand experience.

A four-hour review of the Galactic Starcruiser by YouTuber Jenny Nicholson went viral in May 2024. Nicholson detailed her own experience with the hotel, noting problems with customer service and glitches in the app that prevented her from engaging with the story. In Nicholson's opinion, the experience failed to justify the cost. Nicholson speculated that early reviews of the Starcruiser were based on a press tour that lasted four hours, where aspects such as the app were described by tour guides rather than experienced by the reviewers; this was confirmed by Polygon reviewer Charlie Hall, who noted he and others were never shown the app. Nicholson later said on Twitter that her video had been subject to copyright claims by Disney for the usage of "the music playing in the background of the marketing clips".

In 2026, The Hollywood Reporter stated that while the Galactic Starcruiser "was by far the most immersive experience Disney ever created [...] it's steep price tag limited the market".
