= The Problem with Apu =

2017 American documentary film

- Promotional poster
- Written by: Hari Kondabolu
- Directed by: Michael Melamedoff
- Starring: Hari Kondabolu; Utkarsh Ambudkar; Aziz Ansari; W. Kamau Bell; Samrat Chakrabarti; Shilpa Dave; Noureen DeWulf; Whoopi Goldberg; Dana Gould; Sakina Jaffrey; Aasif Mandvi; Hasan Minhaj; Vivek Murthy; Ajay Naidu; Aparna Nancherla; John Ortved; Maulik Pancholy; Kal Penn; Russell Peters; John Powers; Mallika Rao; Rohitash Rao; Sheetal Sheth
- Country of origin: United States
- Original language: English

Production
- Producers: Michael Melamedoff; Michael J. Cargill
- Running time: 49 minutes

Original release
- Network: truTV
- Release: November 19, 2017

The Problem with Apu is a 2017 American documentary film written by and starring comedian Hari Kondabolu and produced and directed by Michael Melamedoff. It focuses on the character Apu Nahasapeemapetilon, an Indian immigrant in the animated sitcom The Simpsons who, for a period, was the only figure of Indian heritage to appear regularly on mainstream American television. The film explores encounters with negative stereotypes, minstrelsy, racial microaggressions, and slurs against people of Indian and South Asian heritage. Following the documentary, Apu did not have a speaking role on The Simpsons for nine years. In 2026, the character started being voiced by Sunil Malhotra.

== Background ==
Kondabolu grew up watching The Simpsons and cites it as a major influence on his comedy and cultural savvy. Initially, he liked the recurring character of Apu Nahasapeemapetilon because the character was the only representation of his family's culture regularly aired on television in the United States. Kondabolu told the BBC, "Apu was the only Indian we had on TV at all so I was happy for any representation as a kid." As he grew older, Kondabolu became more critical of Apu, saying, "he's funny, but that doesn't mean this representation is accurate or right or righteous. It gets to the insidiousness of racism, though, because you don't even notice it when it's right in front of you."

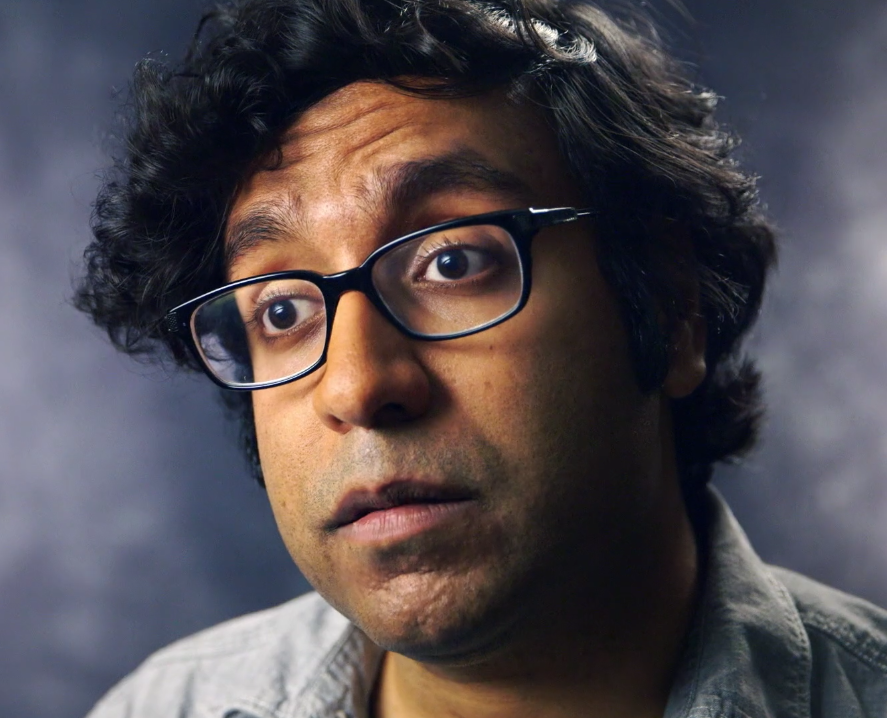
Kondabolu in June 2016

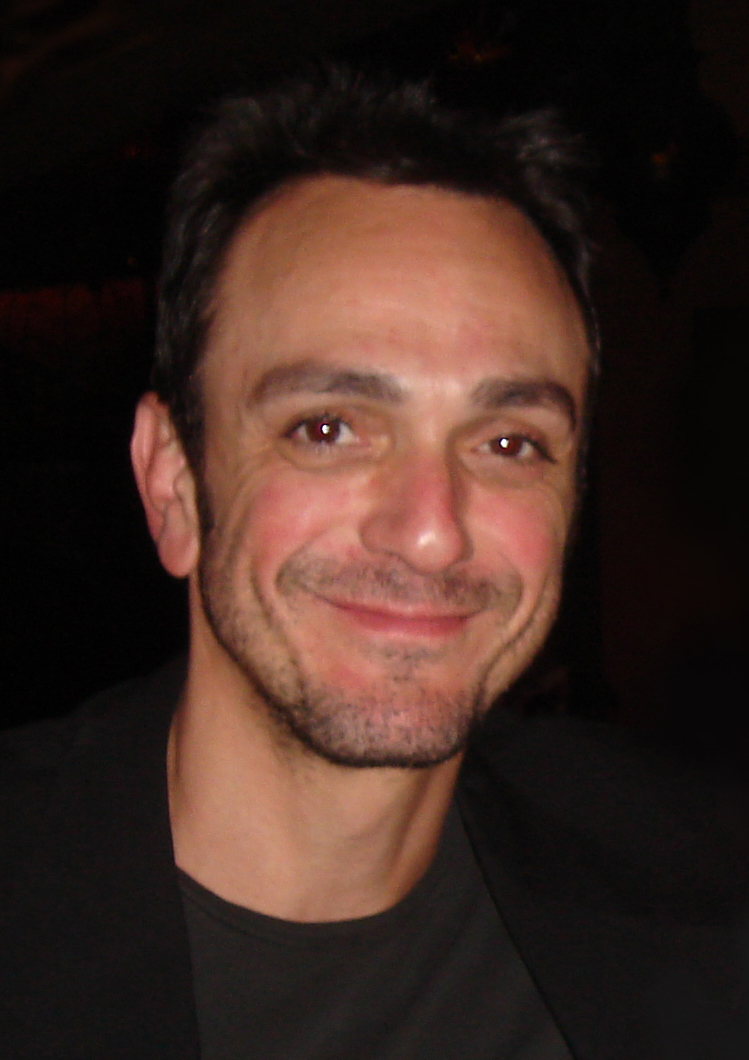
Azaria in November 2005

According to Kondabolu, his mother taught him that "you can criticize something you love because you expect more from it." His first public critique of The Simpsons character came at the insistence of W. Kamau Bell during the first season of his FX television show Totally Biased. In 2012, Kondabolu worked as a writer on the show, and Bell heard him railing against Apu for fomenting racial stereotypes about Indians. Bell then told Kondabolu that if he did not write it into a stand-up comedy routine and perform it on the show, Bell would fire him. In his bit, Kondabolu criticizes voice actor Hank Azaria (who is of Sephardic Jewish descent), calling him "a white guy doing an impression of a white guy making fun of my father". Kondabolu went on to cite other portrayals of South Asians in mainstream television and film—such as a man eating monkey brains in Indiana Jones and the Temple of Doom and an actor petting a stuffed mongoose in a metroPCS commercial—as racist. Kondabolu eventually decided to expand the one-minute segment about Apu into an hour-long documentary.

In a 2015 interview, Azaria acknowledged the character's impact as fodder for widespread racially motivated bullying that targets children with South Asian heritage.

== Themes ==
In the film Kondabolu speaks with other Indian entertainers about the impact of Apu on their lives. Actors Aziz Ansari, Kal Penn, Maulik Pancholy, Utkarsh Ambudkar, Samrat Chakrabarti, Sakina Jaffrey, Aasif Mandvi and Hasan Minhaj relate childhood anecdotes of being called "Apu" by other children or having the character's catchphrases from the show said to them by strangers because of their perceived heritage. They also relate stories of becoming trained professional actors and being asked to deliver lines in the style and accent of Apu.

Kondabolu compares this instance of Azaria portraying a caricature of an Indian shopkeeper to blackface and interviews African-American actress Whoopi Goldberg, who is a longtime collector of racist ephemera from the 20th and 21st centuries. Goldberg agrees with the interpretation of Apu as a form of brownface. Kondabolu traces the origins of The Simpsons character to a legacy of brownface performance by actors such as Peter Sellers in The Party.

In parts of the documentary, Kondabolu expresses his appreciation for The Simpsons as a subversive and culturally astute institution on the landscape of mainstream North American media. Additionally, he draws out a range of opinions from his peers; for instance, while Kondabolu said that despite Apu he still loved The Simpsons, Kal Penn said the character ruined the show for him. Kondabolu said: "I made this film to not only talk about the origin of Apu and highlight the impact of such images in media, but also to celebrate the diversity and complexity of my community."

== Production and release ==
Filming for The Problem with Apu began in April 2016. The film was given special screenings featuring live appearances and talkback with Hari Kondabolu in the fall of 2017, preceding its release on the truTV network on November 19. 250,000 people watched the initial airing on its first-run.

Kondabolu appeared on The Daily Show with Trevor Noah to promote the film. He argued that the Apu character had a serious and insidious effect, and that the use of humor in the portrayal is an artful way of making racism more appealing; this would hypothetically be relieved by the introduction of a range of brown characters, although he did say he did not really care about Apu.

Kondabolu said he had reached out to Azaria to be interviewed for the film, but Azaria declined for fear that his words would be manipulated by the film's editing process. He agreed to have a discussion facilitated either by Terry Gross on the public radio program Fresh Air or on Marc Maron's podcast WTF, but according to Kondabolu, Azaria rescinded the offer once it was accepted.

== Reception ==
The documentary received mostly positive reviews from critics. Review aggregator Rotten Tomatoes gave the film an approval rating of 90% based on reviews from 21 critics, with an average critical score of 8.3/10, Metacritic gave it a score of 77 out of 100, based on four reviews.

Daniel Fienberg, writing for The Hollywood Reporter, praised the documentary for providing "its thesis against the character's acceptability ... with such clarity, it's hard to imagine it generating an adversarial response more cogent than that hoary classic 'It's a joke, stop taking it so seriously,' which is no response at all." Fienberg nonetheless criticized it for skipping over counterarguments.

Scott Pierce of The Salt Lake Tribune found the documentary "thought-provoking and entertaining", and concluded that "Kondabolu raises some troubling questions. I’ll never be able to watch The Simpsons without thinking about this again." Meenasarani Linde Murugan, writing for the Los Angeles Review of Books, contrasted the documentary's progressive advocacy with the view of media diversity promulgated by FCC Chairman Ajit Pai:

In celebrating how far we have come, we should not only remember how brownface and brown voice persist on contemporary television, but also call out those public South Asian figures who would use this same history of ridicule to leverage a vision of the future wholly run by corporations that would further racial and economic inequity.

Justin Charity, writing for The Ringer, agreed with the film's argument, but found the pursuit of Hank Azaria to appear in the film "a prevailing distraction from more ambitious consideration of the ideal future of The Simpsons and the cultural shifts that have rendered Apu increasingly unpalatable." He also found the documentary lacked imagination in finding a solution to creating a more nuanced portrayal of Apu: "that lapse of Kondabolu's imagination is the documentary's real waste." Neal Justin of Minneapolis Star Tribune noted "any criticism directed at the show's portrayal of the convenience-store owner in his documentary ... is drowned out by frustration that he can't land an interview with the character's voice actor." Many Indian fans expressed dissatisfaction with the documentary and genuinely liked Apu.

South Park lampooned the documentary with a 2018 episode "The Problem with a Poo", in which Mr. Hankey is expelled and sent to a land where "people don't care about bigotry and hate" — Springfield — where he is welcomed by Apu. The episode ended with a title card, #cancelthesimpsons, similar to previous promotional material in which South Park had called for its own cancellation. Some viewers assumed that South Park had sided with Kondabolu's documentary, but South Park creators Trey Parker and Matt Stone stated on audio commentary that the people on The Simpsons are their friends, and that the "Poo" episode was a jab at the documentary and its critique of Apu, and that they found it amusing how many misinterpreted the joke as an attack on The Simpsons. Simpsons writer Al Jean said the episode was "actually in favor of us saying people are too critical."

== The Simpsons response ==
Azaria stopped voicing Apu after the documentary was released, and in subsequent Simpsons episodes the character was seen and not heard. Episode "No Good Read Goes Unpunished", first aired on April 8, 2018, was widely received as a response to Kondabolu's film. In it, Marge finds that a book she loved as a child contains elements that would now be considered offensive, and edits the book herself to remove these elements. In doing this, she finds the book loses its "emotional journey". She and Lisa then look to a picture of Apu, and Lisa comments that "something that started decades ago and was applauded and inoffensive, is now politically incorrect. What can you do?" Kondabolu wrote on Twitter that he was disappointed that the message of his film had been reduced to the concept of "politically incorrect". In an interview with USA Today, creator Matt Groening dismissed the criticism of the Apu character, saying "I think it's a time in our culture where people love to pretend they're offended". Simpsons writer and producer Mike Reiss wrote in his 2018 memoir Springfield Confidential that he believed that Kondabolu had made a "nasty little documentary" and that taunting Indian children about Apu was not racist but "kids [being] dicks".

During an appearance that same month on The Late Show with Stephen Colbert, Azaria said that he would be "perfectly willing to step aside" from the role of voicing Apu, saying that he was increasingly worried about the character causing harm by reinforcing stereotypes and that "the most important thing is to listen to Indian people and their experience with it ... I really want to see Indian, South Asian writers in the writers' room, genuinely informing whichever direction this character takes." Kondabolu had a positive reaction to Azaria's comments.

Azaria announced in January 2020 that he "won't be doing the voice anymore, unless there's some way to transition it or something." In June 2020, in response to the George Floyd protests, the show's producers announced in a statement that The Simpsons will no longer have non-white characters voiced by white actors.

In the April 12, 2021, episode of Dax Shepard's podcast Armchair Expert, Azaria apologized for "racism, my participation in racism, or at least in a racist practice or in structural racism, as it relates to show business or ... all the above." One reaction to Azaria's apology came from actress and writer Mellini Kantayya, who in a Washington Post opinion piece wrote about Azaria's concession:

... and for him to say so not in a carefully crafted PR statement, but in a conversation long after the news cycle had moved on, caught me off guard. Azaria reached his conclusions after years of learning and reflection. He recognized how his work had hurt Indian Americans and wanted to start making amends. That's why I cried. His apology was cold comfort, given my past, but the validation and acknowledgment still mattered.

In April 2023, Azaria and Kondabolu met for the first time in a public forum to discuss the documentary and how it impacted both comedians on NPR’s Code Switch podcast. Azaria thanked Kondabolu for "dragging and pushing me into this conversation". Kondabolu responded:

It means a lot to hear you say that. I know you've told me privately the impact that I've made, but to hear that publicly is a really big deal to me because one of the things that frustrated me after the film came out is that I was getting death threats […] So for you to say it now does mean a lot.

In 2026, Apu began to be voiced by Sunil Malhotra, and the character's wife Manjula by Janina Gavankar, which Kondabolu described as "a clever solution to all this".
