= Apu Nahasapeemapetilon =

Fictional character from The Simpsons franchise

- The Simpsons character
- Apu doing an Indian namaste pose
- First appearance: "The Telltale Head" (1990)
- Created by: Matt Groening
- Designed by: Matt Groening
- Voiced by: Hank Azaria (1990–2017); Sunil Malhotra (2026–present)

In-universe information
- Gender: Male
- Occupation: Owner/operator of the Kwik-E-Mart; Chief of Springfield Volunteer Fire Department; Computer scientist
- Family: Sanjay (brother); Tikku (brother, deceased); Vijay (cousin)
- Spouse: Manjula
- Children: The Nahasapeemapetilon octuplets (Note: Four Sons: Anoop, Nabendu, Sandeep, and Gheet and Four Daughters: Uma, Poonam, Pria, and Sashi)
- Relatives: Pahusacheta (niece); Jamshed (nephew)
- Religion: Hinduism
- Origin: Rahmatpur, West Bengal, India

Apu Nahasapeemapetilon is a character in the American animated television series The Simpsons. He has appeared in episodes since 1990. He is an Indian immigrant proprietor who ran the Kwik-E-Mart, a popular convenience store in Springfield, and was known for his exaggeratedly accented catchphrase, "thank you, come again". He was voiced by Hank Azaria from 1990 to 2017, and first appeared in the episode "The Telltale Head". He was named after the title character of The Apu Trilogy by Satyajit Ray.

Hari Kondabolu's documentary The Problem with Apu, released in 2017, criticized the character as a South Asian stereotype. In response to this, Azaria announced in early 2020 that he and the series' producers had agreed that he would resign from the role as Apu. The last time Azaria voiced Apu was in the 2017 episode "The Serfsons". The character would subsequently appear occasionally in the show in non-speaking appearances. In 2022, comedian and entertainer Akaash Singh created the comedy special Bring Back Apu, where he disputed the concept of Apu being negative representation for Indian-Americans. Apu returned as a speaking character in the 2026 episode "Treehouse of Horror Presents: The Revengening", now voiced by Indian-American actor Sunil Malhotra.

== Role in The Simpsons ==
=== Biography ===
In the episode "Homer and Apu", Apu says he is from Rahmatpur, West Bengal. Apu is a naturalized American citizen, and he holds a Ph.D. in computer science. He graduated first in his class of seven million at 'Caltech' – Calcutta Technical Institute – going on to earn his doctorate at the Springfield Heights Institute of Technology.

Apu began working at the Kwik-E-Mart during graduate school to pay off his student loan; he stayed afterwards as he enjoyed his job and the friends he had made. He remained an illegal immigrant until Mayor Quimby proposed a municipal law to expel all undocumented aliens. Apu responded by purchasing a forged birth certificate from the Springfield Mafia that listed his parents as American citizens Herb and Judy Nahasapeemapetilon from Green Bay, Wisconsin. When, however, he realized he was forsaking his origins, he abandoned this plan and instead successfully managed to pass his citizenship test with help from Lisa and Homer Simpson. Thus, he refers to himself as a "semi-legal alien".

In 1985, Apu was a member of the barbershop quartet The Be Sharps, along with Homer Simpson, Barney Gumble, and Principal Seymour Skinner. Upon the advice of the band manager, Nigel, Apu took the stage name "Apu de Beaumarchais" (a reference to Pierre Beaumarchais, author of The Barber of Seville). Apu is a dietary vegan, as revealed in the season 7 episode "Lisa the Vegetarian".

=== Family ===
In the episode "The Two Mrs. Nahasapeemapetilons", Apu enjoys a brief period as Springfield's leading ladies' man after being spontaneously drawn into a bachelor auction. He spends the days following the auction on a whirlwind of dates, which suddenly ends when his mother announces his arranged marriage to a woman named Manjula, whom he had not seen since childhood. Apu tries to get out of the arrangement at first, with Marge Simpson pretending to be his wife, until Apu's mother finds her with Homer. However, he is won over when he meets Manjula at the wedding, and the two decide to give the marriage a try, with Manjula noting nonchalantly that they can always get a divorce. Later, the two actually fall in love.

In the episode "Eight Misbehavin'", Manjula receives too many doses of fertility drugs, leading to her giving birth to octuplets: Anoop, Uma, Nabendu, Poonam, Pria, Sandeep, Sashi, and Gheet. This causes difficulties for the family but finally they decide to get on with their lives. During the episode "Bart-Mangled Banner", when the town changes its name to Libertyville to be patriotic after it is claimed Springfield hates America, Apu temporarily changes his children's names to Lincoln, Freedom, Condoleezza, Coke, Pepsi, Manifest Destiny, Apple Pie, and Superman.

Apu and Manjula have a mostly happy marriage, despite understandable marital problems caused by Apu's workaholic nature and long hours, and the strain of caring for eight children. A strain came up when Manjula learned that Apu works longer than he needs to, resulting in Apu showering Manjula with many gifts. A further strain came up when Apu was unfaithful to Manjula, causing him to briefly move out and even making him contemplate suicide. He and his family are devout Hindus, and he particularly venerates Ganesha.

Sanjay (voiced by Harry Shearer), Apu's brother, helps run the Kwik-E-Mart. Sanjay has a daughter named Pahasatira, and a son named Jamshed, all of whom share the Nahasapeemapetilon surname. Apu has another younger brother, who is only mentioned in "The Two Mrs. Nahasapeemapetilons", where Apu was shown on a chart as the oldest of three. Apu also has a cousin living in India named Kavi, also voiced by Azaria, who helped Homer while he was in India. Kavi works for several American companies taking service calls using General American, cowboy, and Jamaican accents.

=== Other appearances ===
Apu is a playable character in The Simpsons: Hit & Run (2003) video game. His quest in the game is to redeem himself for unknowingly selling the tainted Buzz Cola that has made the residents of Springfield insane. Apu also makes an appearance in The Simpsons: Road Rage (2001) as a passenger and unlockable playable character. He also is a character players acquire fairly early on in the open-ended online game The Simpsons: Tapped Out (2012). In 2015, Apu appeared as a non-playable character in the toys-to-life video game Lego Dimensions. In-game, he appears in the Simpsons levels and does not speak.

== Character ==
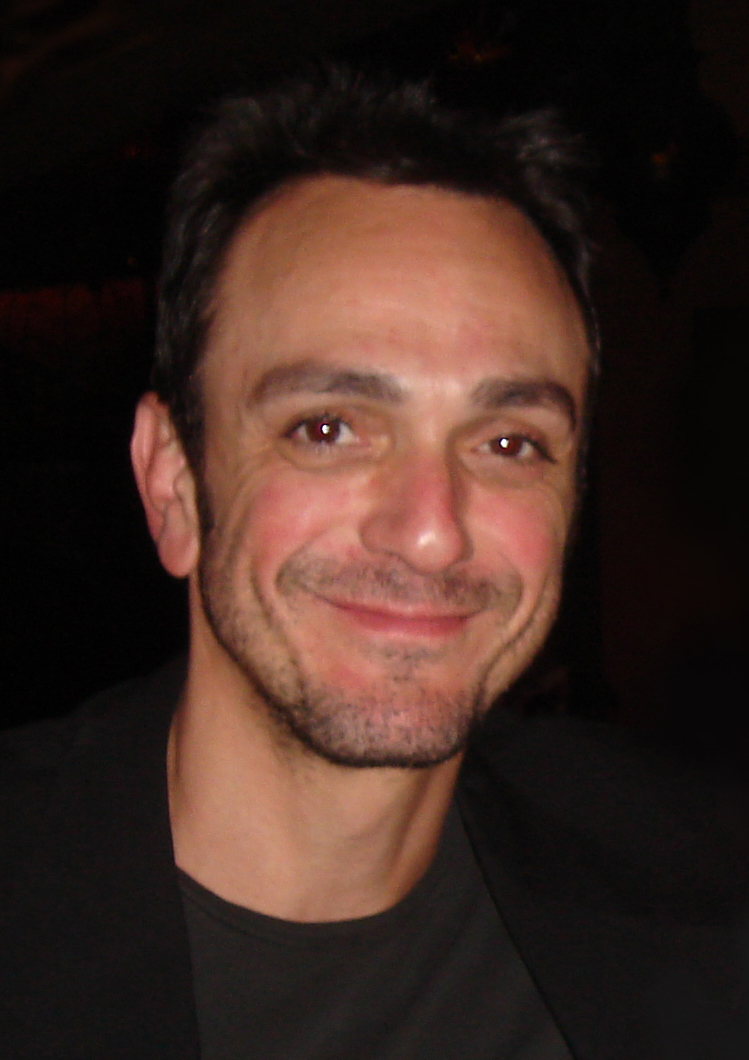
Hank Azaria voiced Apu from the start of the show until 2017; he stepped down from the role permanently in 2020.

Apu first appeared in the season one episode "The Telltale Head". Al Jean and Mike Reiss claim that while creating the character, the writers decided they would not make him ethnic, as they felt it would be too offensive and stereotypical and did not want to offend viewers, but that the concept stayed because Hank Azaria's reading of the line "Hello, Mr. Homer" received a huge laugh from the writers. Azaria, however, has disputed this account, claiming instead that the writers asked him to create a stereotypical Indian accent for the character. Azaria has said that he based Apu's voice on Indian convenience store workers in Los Angeles with whom he had interacted when he first moved to the area. He also loosely based it on Peter Sellers' character Hrundi V. Bakshi from the 1968 film The Party, who Azaria thinks has a similar personality to Apu.

Apu's first name is a homage to the main character in The Apu Trilogy, directed by Satyajit Ray. His surname is a scrambled version of "Pahasadee Napetilon", the full name of a schoolmate of Simpsons writer Jeff Martin. It was first used in the episode "A Streetcar Named Marge".

In the ninth season of the show, Apu marries Manjula in the episode "The Two Mrs. Nahasapeemapetilons". Richard Appel first constructed the idea for Apu's marriage. Andrea Martin provided the voice of Apu's mother in the episode, recording her part in New York. She wanted to get the voice perfect, so in between takes she listened to tapes of Azaria reading lines for Apu, to make sure her voice could realistically be Apu's mother's.

== Reception ==
=== Popularity ===
Apu is one of the most prominent South Asian caricatures on primetime television in the United States. Hank Azaria has won three Primetime Emmy Awards for Outstanding Voice-Over Performance, winning in 1998 for his performance as Apu, again in 2001 for "Worst Episode Ever", and a third time in 2003 for "Moe Baby Blues" for voicing several characters, including Apu.

Apu's image has been widely licensed, on items ranging from board games to automobile air fresheners. In July 2007, convenience store chain 7-Eleven converted 11 of its stores in the United States and one in Canada into Kwik-E-Marts to celebrate the release of The Simpsons Movie.

=== Accusations of racial stereotyping ===
Apu's portrayal has been accused by many as being a racist caricature of Indians and South Asians in general and was criticized as showing bias along racial/ethnic lines and called "brownvoice" (similar to "blackface"). A 2011 magazine article accused Apu of replicating "model minority" stereotypes.

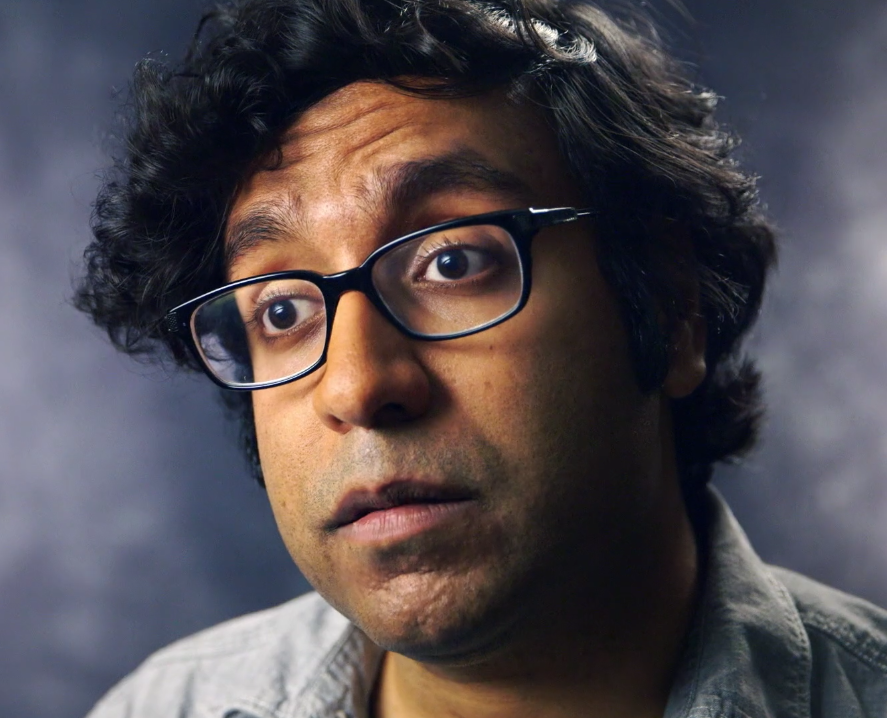
American stand-up comedian and writer Hari Kondabolu criticized Apu as a negative stereotype of Indians in his documentary The Problem with Apu (2017)

According to Kondabolu, in a Totally Biased with W. Kamau Bell web-exclusive segment, there were negative reactions to Apu in the Indian-American community, as well as the greater Desi community. Pakistani-American comedian and actor Kumail Nanjiani has also criticized the character, relating that early in his career, he was asked to do "the Apu accent", a stereotyped version of the speech patterns of Indians. In a 2007 interview, Azaria acknowledged some of this criticism when he recalled a conversation with the writers of the show during the inception of the character: "Right away they were like 'Can you do an Indian accent and how offensive can you make it?' basically. I was like, 'It's not tremendously accurate. It's a little, uh, stereotype,' and they were like, 'Eh, that's all right.'" In a 2013 interview with The Huffington Post, Azaria said it should not be expected that the character's accent would "suddenly change now" or that the character would be written out, saying, "I'd be surprised if [the show's writers] write him any less frequently because he's offensive."

In 2016, Kondabolu announced his intention to produce a documentary about "how this controversial caricature was created, burrowed its way into the hearts and minds of Americans and continues to exist – intact – twenty-six years later". In 2017, Kondabolu released the hour-long documentary The Problem with Apu, in which he interviews actors and comics of South Asian heritage about the impact that the character of Apu has had on their lives and the perception of South Asians in American culture.

In April 2018, The Simpsons reacted to the controversy surrounding Apu in the episode "No Good Read Goes Unpunished". Marge introduces Lisa to her favorite childhood book, but is shocked by its racist stereotypes and attempts to rewrite it to suit modern sensitivities. Lisa is bored by this revised version, and Marge asks what she should do; Lisa replies "It's hard to say. Something that started decades ago and was applauded and inoffensive is now politically incorrect. What can you do?" She then looks at a picture of Apu with "Don't have a cow, man" written on it, and the two characters say that the issue will be dealt with later, if at all. Kondabolu said that he was saddened by the show's dismissive take on the controversy. Mike Reiss, The Simpsons' longtime writer and producer, acknowledged the problem, and pointed out that Apu had not had a line in the show for the last three years.

During an appearance that same month on The Late Show with Stephen Colbert, Azaria said that he would be "perfectly willing to step aside" from the role of voicing Apu, saying that he was increasingly worried about the character causing harm by reinforcing stereotypes and that "the most important thing is to listen to Indian people and their experience with it ... I really want to see Indian, South Asian writers in the writers' room, genuinely informing whichever direction this character takes." Kondabolu had a positive reaction to Azaria's comments.

In an interview with USA Today, creator Matt Groening dismissed the criticism of the Apu character, saying, "I think it's a time in our culture where people love to pretend they're offended". Dana Walden, the CEO of 20th Century Fox Television, said in an August 2018 interview in regard to the Apu controversy that the network trusts the showrunners "to handle it in the way that's best for the show". In October 2018, in the South Park episode "The Problem with a Poo", Mr. Hankey is expelled and sent to a land where "people don't care about bigotry and hate" – Springfield. The episode ended with a title card, #cancelthesimpsons, similar to the promo for South Park that called for the cancellation of itself. That said, on the DVD commentary South Park creators Trey Parker and Matt Stone stated that the people on The Simpsons are their friends and that joke was not a jab at The Simpsons but at the documentary and that they found it amusing how many misinterpreted the joke as an attack on The Simpsons. Al Jean also tweeted about the episode "It's actually in favor of us saying people are too critical."

In the UK, Hugo Rifkind criticized in The Times what he characterized as the prevalent attitude concerning potentially offensive material: that the possibility that somebody might be offended is enough for material to be considered offensive. He also stated that Apu is portrayed very positively, smarter than every other character except for Lisa, and that the show was much ruder about other characters like Ned Flanders, Krusty and Groundskeeper Willie.

On October 26, Adi Shankar stated in an interview with IndieWire that Apu would be leaving The Simpsons. On October 29, 2018, executive producer Al Jean responded to the speculation and stated that "Adi Shankar is not a producer on The Simpsons. I wish him the best but he does not speak for our show". On August 27, 2019, several sources reported that Groening had confirmed Apu's continued position on the show during the Simpsons panel at Disney's D23 Expo, telling a fan who asked whether or not Apu would remain, "Yes. We love Apu. We're proud of Apu."

Azaria announced on January 17, 2020, that he and the production team agreed to allow him to step away from voicing Apu, "unless there's some way to transition it or something". Azaria had followed the debate over the previous years since Kondabolu's essay and documentary, read up on and attended seminars on racism and social consciousness, and spoken to Indian-American colleagues including fellow actor Utkarsh Ambudkar (who had performed as Apu's nephew in "Much Apu About Something") about the situation. He came to understand the issues around the character of Apu compared to the other stereotypical characters on The Simpsons was the idea of permissible use, which led to his decision to quit voicing Apu. Azaria said, "There hasn't been an outcry over these [other] characters [that play on non-South Asian stereotypes] because people feel they're represented. They don't take it so personally, nor do they feel oppressed or insulted by it."

On June 26, 2020, it was stated that "Moving forward, The Simpsons will no longer have white actors voice non-white characters." This follows Mike Henry stating that he will no longer voice the African-American character Cleveland Brown on fellow Fox animated series Family Guy, and Jenny Slate and Kristen Bell's announcement that they will no longer voice mixed-race characters on Big Mouth and Central Park, respectively. There were plans for Apu to make an appearance in season 33. However, Groening stated "we have to see if we can make the stories work".

In the April 12, 2021, episode of Dax Shepard's podcast Armchair Expert, Azaria apologized for "racism, my participation in racism, or at least in a racist practice or in structural racism, as it relates to showbusiness or...all the above." One reaction to Azaria's apology came from actress and writer Mellini Kantayya, who, in a Washington Post opinion piece, wrote that hearing Azaria's concession "and for him to say so not in a carefully crafted PR statement, but in a conversation long after the news cycle had moved on, caught me off guard. Azaria reached his conclusions after years of learning and reflection. He recognized how his work had hurt Indian Americans and wanted to start making amends. That's why I cried. His apology was cold comfort, given my past, but the validation and acknowledgment still mattered."

In 2022, comedian and entertainer Akaash Singh made a comedy stand up special called "Bring Back Apu", where he claims that the character is "not racist", and represented the American Dream.

Azaria and Kondabolu did a joint interview on the topic with the radio program All Things Considered in April 2023. In an April 2025 interview with Pablo Torre, Azaria explained he felt he was "participating in a harm" because Apu was the most famous representation of South Asians in media and is often used as a caricature to support anti-Indian sentiment.
