= Sunil Malhotra =

Indian-born American actor

- Malhotra in 2023
- Born: October 20, 1975 (age 51); New Delhi, India
- Education: Indiana University
- Occupation: Actor
- Years active: 2001–present

Sunil Malhotra (born October 20, 1975) is an Indian-born American actor.

== Life and career ==
Malhotra was born in New Delhi. At an early age, he and his family emigrated to the United States, and was raised in Chicago, Illinois. He attended Indiana University, earning his BA degree in theatre. He began his screen career in 2001, playing Hemant in the film American Desi. In 2003, he starred as Harishkumar Satishkumar Pate, the geeky college student in the film Dude, Where's the Party?, starring along with Kal Penn and Serena Varghese. According to India Today, he performed on stage in 2004.

Later in his career, Malhotra voiced characters in numerous television programs such as The Legend of Vox Machina, The Loud House (and its spin-off The Casagrandes), Skull Island. The Mr. Peabody & Sherman Show, Sanjay and Craig, Blaze and the Monster Machines, The Adventures of Kid Danger, The Legend of Korra, Regular Show and Stillwater. He also voiced characters in numerous video games such as Killzone 3, Fallout: New Vegas, Halo: Reach, X-Men: Destiny, Valorant, Mortal Kombat 1, Mortal Kombat 11, Aliens: Colonial Marines, Hi-Fi Rush, Mortal Kombat: Onslaught and The Outer Worlds 2. Aside from voice acting, he guest-starred in television programs including ER, House, The West Wing, NCIS: New Orleans and Cold Case.

In 2026, Malhotra began voicing Apu Nahasapeemapetilon, the owner of the Kwik-E-Mart, in the Fox animated sitcom television series The Simpsons. Apu was previously voiced by Hank Azaria, who stepped down from the role because of "racial stereotyping" concerns following the release of Hari Kondabolu's The Problem with Apu in 2017, a concept refuted by Akaash Singh's Bring Back Apu in 2022.

== Filmography ==
=== Film ===
Year	Title	Role	Notes
2011	Dead Space: Aftermath	Omar Nayim (voice)	
2011	Green Lantern: Emerald Knights	Bolphunga's Ship (voice)	
2022	Green Lantern: Beware My Power	Power Ring, Rannian Commander (voice)	

=== Television ===
Year	Title	Role	Notes
2011	Star Wars: The Clone Wars	Jinx (voice)	2 episodes
2011	Regular Show	Teacher (voice)	Episode: "More Smarter"
2014	The Legend of Korra	Prince Wu, additional voices	10 episodes
2014–2025	Blaze and the Monster Machines	Stripes (voice)	Main cast
2016	Sanjay and Craig	Barber, Tiger Trainer, Actors (voice)	Episode: "Booyah for Bollywood"
2016	The Mr. Peabody & Sherman Show	Sweet Tune Swami (voice)	2 episodes
2017	Freedom Fighters: The Ray	Jacob (voice)	3 episodes
2018	The Adventures of Kid Danger	Dr. Mcsqueeze, College Guy (voice)	Episode: "Fails"
2019–present	The Loud House	Par, Sancho the Pigeon, various voices	Recurring role
2019–2022	The Casagrandes	Par, Sancho the Pigeon, various voices	Recurring role
2020–2021	Stillwater	Arjun, Llama (voice)	2 episodes
2022–present	The Legend of Vox Machina	Shaun Gilmore (voice)	Recurring role
2022	Star Wars: Tales of the Jedi	Nak-il Tano (voice)	Episode: "Life and Death"
2023	Skull Island	Handsome Merc (voice)	2 episodes
2024	Go! Go! Loser Ranger!	Kai Shion (voice)	English dub
2026–present	The Simpsons	Apu Nahasapeemapetilon (voice)	Recurring role, replacing Hank Azaria

=== Video games ===
Year	Title	Role	Notes
2010	Halo: Reach	Jun-A266	
2010	Fallout: New Vegas	Robobrain, Player's Brain, Muggy	
2011	Killzone 3	ISA Troops	
2011	X-Men: Destiny	Quicksilver	
2012	Spec Ops: The Line	Refugees	
2013	Anarchy Reigns	Durga	
2013	Aliens: Colonial Marines	Weyland-Yutani Commandos	
2019	Mortal Kombat 11	Kung Lao, The Great Kung Lao	
2019	Indivisible	Tungar	
2021	Blaze and the Monster Machines: Axle City Racers	Stripes	
2022	Valorant	Harbor	
2023	Hi-Fi Rush	CNMN	
2023	Mortal Kombat 1	Kung Lao	
2023	Avatar: The Last Airbender – Quest for Balance	Bumi, Fire Sage	
2023	Mortal Kombat: Onslaught	Kung Lao	
2025	The Outer Worlds 2	Tristan	
