= Key demographic =

Cohorts most-often targeted in broadcasting

The key demographic or target demographic is a term in commercial broadcasting that refers to the most desirable demographic group to a given advertiser. Key demographics vary by outlet, time of day, and programming type, but they are generally composed of individuals who are younger and more affluent than the general public: young adult viewers (defined by some sources as the 18–34 age group) have been television's main target demographic for decades, having a relatively high disposable income and lower brand loyalty compared to other age groups.

== Television ==
In the television industry, most key demographic groups are seen as adults between the ages of 18 and 54.

For example, the key demographic for at least reality television is women with disposable income aged 18 to 34, as well as the WB Television Network ("eighteen to thirty-four-year-old viewers.)" Television programming is tailored to members of its key demographics: "Despite the increase in time-shifting to watch recorded television and shows on the Internet, the use of television as an advertising vehicle is still determined by demographic characteristics or who is watching at what time." The subset of ratings that only includes the key demographic of 18- to 49-year-olds is often referred to as the "key demo". Certain radio formats (especially those dubbed "classic") and television outlets may target persons 35 to 64, who generally have more disposable income than millennials, in part due to the late 2000s recession, which impeded career opportunities for younger generations.

== See also ==
- Channel drift
- Target audience
