= List of The Simpsons Treehouse of Horror episodes =

Treehouse of Horror, also known as The Simpsons Halloween Specials, is a series of Halloween-themed episodes of the animated sitcom The Simpsons, each consisting of three separate, self-contained segments. These segments usually involve the family in some horror, science fiction, or supernatural setting and always take place outside the normal continuity of the show. Therefore, they are considered non-canon.

The original "Treehouse of Horror" episode aired on October 25, 1990, and was inspired by EC Comics Horror tales. From "Treehouse of Horror" (1990) to "X" (1999), every episode has aired in the week preceding or on October 31; "II" and "X" are the only two episodes that had aired on Halloween. Between "XI" (2000) to "XIX" (2008) and "XXI" (2010), due to Fox's contract with Major League Baseball's World Series, episodes had originally aired in November. "XX" (2009) and each Treehouse of Horror episode since "XXII" (2011) has aired in October, with the exception of season 32's "XXXI" (2020), which was originally scheduled for October 18, 2020, but was pushed back two weeks later to November 1 due to the 2020 NLCS reaching game 7. This was the first time since "XXI" that a Treehouse of Horror episode aired in November. The same thing happened with season 35's "XXXIV" (2023) and season 36's "XXXV" (2024), which aired on November 5, 2023, and November 3, 2024, respectively.

The first 13 Treehouse of Horror episodes had all three segments written by different writers and in some cases there was a fourth writer that wrote the opening and wraparound segments. The original episode even had three different directors. Starting with season 15's "XIV" (2003), only one writer was credited as having written a Treehouse of Horror episode, and the trend has continued through season 33's "XXXII" (2021). Season 34's "XXXIII" (2022) went back to the earlier notion of having different writers for each segment.

As of 2025, there are 38 Treehouse of Horror episodes, with one airing every year. The 34th season marked the first time two Treehouse of Horror specials were aired, with one episode being a single story ("Not It") and another featuring three segments ("Treehouse of Horror XXXIII"). The 36th season likewise had a second special Treehouse of Horror Presents episode ("Simpsons Wicked This Way Comes"), as did the 38th season ("The Revengening"). The 31st season included a Thanksgiving-themed spinoff, "Thanksgiving of Horror". They are known for being more violent than an average Simpsons episode and contain several different trademarks, including the alien characters Kang and Kodos who have appeared in every episode. Quite often the segments will parody well-known movies, books, radio shows, and television shows. The Twilight Zone has been parodied quite often, and has served as the inspiration for numerous segments.

== Episodes ==
No. special	No. overall	Segments	Parody of (Note: Properties are only listed if a significant portion of the segment's plot is a parody, and has been cited by the show creators or a review published by a reliable source. Excluded are title-only references and brief jokes.)	Directed by	Written by	Original release date	Prod. code	Episode
I	16	"Bad Dream House"	Poltergeist and The Amityville Horror	Wes Archer	John Swartzwelder	October 25, 1990	7F04	Season 2 Episode 3
I	16	"Hungry are the Damned"	"To Serve Man"	Rich Moore	Jay Kogen & Wallace Wolodarsky	October 25, 1990	7F04	Season 2 Episode 3
I	16	"The Raven"	"The Raven"	David Silverman	Sam Simon & Edgar Allan Poe	October 25, 1990	7F04	Season 2 Episode 3
II	42	"The Monkey's Paw"	"The Monkey's Paw" and "A Small Talent for War"	Jim Reardon	Al Jean, Mike Reiss; Jeff Martin, George Meyer; Sam Simon, John Swartzwelder	October 31, 1991	8F02	Season 3 Episode 7
II	42	"The Bart Zone"	"It's a Good Life"	Jim Reardon	Al Jean, Mike Reiss; Jeff Martin, George Meyer; Sam Simon, John Swartzwelder	October 31, 1991	8F02	Season 3 Episode 7
II	42	"If I Only Had a Brain"	Frankenstein	Jim Reardon	Al Jean, Mike Reiss; Jeff Martin, George Meyer; Sam Simon, John Swartzwelder	October 31, 1991	8F02	Season 3 Episode 7
III	64	"Clown Without Pity"	"Living Doll", Child's Play, and Trilogy of Terror	Carlos Baeza	Al Jean & Mike Reiss	October 29, 1992	9F04	Season 4 Episode 5
III	64	"King Homer"	King Kong (original for animation and 1976 version for script)	Carlos Baeza	Jay Kogen & Wallace Wolodarsky	October 29, 1992	9F04	Season 4 Episode 5
III	64	"Dial 'Z' for Zombies"	Return of the Living Dead, Night of the Living Dead and Pet Sematary	Carlos Baeza	Sam Simon & Jon Vitti	October 29, 1992	9F04	Season 4 Episode 5
IV	86	"Wraparounds"	Night Gallery	David Silverman	Conan O'Brien	October 28, 1993	1F04	Season 5 Episode 5
IV	86	"The Devil and Homer Simpson"	"The Devil and Daniel Webster"	David Silverman	Greg Daniels & Dan McGrath	October 28, 1993	1F04	Season 5 Episode 5
IV	86	"Terror at 5½ Feet"	"Nightmare at 20,000 Feet"	David Silverman	Bill Oakley & Josh Weinstein	October 28, 1993	1F04	Season 5 Episode 5
IV	86	"Bart Simpson's Dracula"	Bram Stoker's Dracula	David Silverman	Bill Canterbury	October 28, 1993	1F04	Season 5 Episode 5
V	109	"The Shinning"	The Shining	Jim Reardon	Bob Kushell	October 30, 1994	2F03	Season 6 Episode 6
V	109	"Time and Punishment"	"A Sound of Thunder"	Jim Reardon	Greg Daniels & Dan McGrath	October 30, 1994	2F03	Season 6 Episode 6
V	109	"Nightmare Cafeteria"	Soylent Green	Jim Reardon	David X. Cohen	October 30, 1994	2F03	Season 6 Episode 6
VI	134	"Attack of the 50-Foot Eyesores"	Attack of the 50 Foot Woman	Bob Anderson	John Swartzwelder	October 29, 1995	3F04	Season 7 Episode 6
VI	134	"Nightmare on Evergreen Terrace"	A Nightmare on Elm Street	Bob Anderson	Steve Tompkins	October 29, 1995	3F04	Season 7 Episode 6
VI	134	"Homer^{3}"	"Little Girl Lost"	Bob Anderson	David X. Cohen	October 29, 1995	3F04	Season 7 Episode 6
VII	154	"The Thing and I"	N/A	Mike B. Anderson	Ken Keeler	October 27, 1996	4F02	Season 8 Episode 1
VII	154	"The Genesis Tub"	"The Little People"	Mike B. Anderson	Dan Greaney	October 27, 1996	4F02	Season 8 Episode 1
VII	154	"Citizen Kang"	1996 U.S. presidential election	Mike B. Anderson	David X. Cohen	October 27, 1996	4F02	Season 8 Episode 1
VIII	182	"The HΩmega Man"	The Omega Man	Mark Kirkland	Mike Scully	October 26, 1997	5F02	Season 9 Episode 5
VIII	182	"Fly vs. Fly"	The Fly	Mark Kirkland	David X. Cohen	October 26, 1997	5F02	Season 9 Episode 5
VIII	182	"Easy-Bake Coven"	Salem witch trials	Mark Kirkland	Ned Goldreyer	October 26, 1997	5F02	Season 9 Episode 5
IX	207	"Hell Toupée"	"Hell Toupee" (Amazing Stories)	Steven Dean Moore	Donick Cary	October 25, 1998	AABF01	Season 10; Episode 4
IX	207	"The Terror of Tiny Toon"	Stay Tuned	Steven Dean Moore	Larry Doyle	October 25, 1998	AABF01	Season 10; Episode 4
IX	207	"Starship Poopers"	N/A	Steven Dean Moore	David X. Cohen	October 25, 1998	AABF01	Season 10; Episode 4
X	230	"I Know What You Diddily-Iddily-Did"	I Know What You Did Last Summer	Pete Michels	Donick Cary	October 31, 1999	BABF01	Season 11; Episode 4
X	230	"Desperately Xeeking Xena"	Fantastic Four	Pete Michels	Tim Long	October 31, 1999	BABF01	Season 11; Episode 4
X	230	"Life's a Glitch, Then You Die"	Year 2000 problem	Pete Michels	Ron Hauge	October 31, 1999	BABF01	Season 11; Episode 4
XI	249	"G-G-Ghost D-D-Dad"	N/A	Matthew Nastuk	Rob LaZebnik	November 1, 2000	BABF21	Season 12; Episode 1
XI	249	"Scary Tales Can Come True"	Grimms' Fairy Tales, specifically Hansel and Gretel and Goldilocks And The Three Bears	Matthew Nastuk	John Frink & Don Payne	November 1, 2000	BABF21	Season 12; Episode 1
XI	249	"Night of the Dolphin"	The Day of the Dolphin, The Birds and Jaws	Matthew Nastuk	Carolyn Omine	November 1, 2000	BABF21	Season 12; Episode 1
XII	270	"Hex and the City"	Thinner	Jim Reardon	Joel H. Cohen	November 6, 2001	CABF19	Season 13; Episode 1
XII	270	"House of Whacks"	2001: A Space Odyssey and Demon Seed	Jim Reardon	John Frink & Don Payne	November 6, 2001	CABF19	Season 13; Episode 1
XII	270	"Wiz Kids"	Harry Potter	Jim Reardon	Carolyn Omine	November 6, 2001	CABF19	Season 13; Episode 1
XIII	292	"Send in the Clones"	Multiplicity	David Silverman	Marc Wilmore	November 3, 2002	DABF19	Season 14; Episode 1
XIII	292	"The Fright to Creep and Scare Harms"	N/A	David Silverman	Brian Kelley	November 3, 2002	DABF19	Season 14; Episode 1
XIII	292	"The Island of Dr. Hibbert"	The Island of Doctor Moreau	David Silverman	Kevin Curran	November 3, 2002	DABF19	Season 14; Episode 1
XIV	314	"Reaper Madness"	The Grim Reaper	Steven Dean Moore	John Swartzwelder	November 2, 2003	EABF21	Season 15; Episode 1
XIV	314	"Frinkenstein"	Frankenstein	Steven Dean Moore	John Swartzwelder	November 2, 2003	EABF21	Season 15; Episode 1
XIV	314	"Stop the World, I Want to Goof Off"	"A Kind of a Stopwatch"	Steven Dean Moore	John Swartzwelder	November 2, 2003	EABF21	Season 15; Episode 1
XV	336	"The Ned Zone"	The Dead Zone	David Silverman	Bill Odenkirk	November 7, 2004	FABF23	Season 16; Episode 1
XV	336	"Four Beheadings and a Funeral"	From Hell and Sherlock Holmes	David Silverman	Bill Odenkirk	November 7, 2004	FABF23	Season 16; Episode 1
XV	336	"In the Belly of the Boss"	Fantastic Voyage	David Silverman	Bill Odenkirk	November 7, 2004	FABF23	Season 16; Episode 1
XVI	360	"B.I. Bartificial Intelligence"	A.I. Artificial Intelligence	David Silverman	Marc Wilmore	November 6, 2005	GABF17	Season 17; Episode 4
XVI	360	"Survival of the Fattest"	"The Most Dangerous Game"	David Silverman	Marc Wilmore	November 6, 2005	GABF17	Season 17; Episode 4
XVI	360	"I've Grown a Costume on Your Face"	"The Masks"	David Silverman	Marc Wilmore	November 6, 2005	GABF17	Season 17; Episode 4
XVII	382	"Married to the Blob"	The Blob	David Silverman; Matthew Faughnan	Peter Gaffney	November 5, 2006	HABF17	Season 18; Episode 4
XVII	382	"You Gotta Know When to Golem"	The Golem	David Silverman; Matthew Faughnan	Peter Gaffney	November 5, 2006	HABF17	Season 18; Episode 4
XVII	382	"The Day the Earth Looked Stupid"	The War of the Worlds	David Silverman; Matthew Faughnan	Peter Gaffney	November 5, 2006	HABF17	Season 18; Episode 4
XVIII	405	"E.T., Go Home"	E.T. the Extra-Terrestrial	Chuck Sheetz	Marc Wilmore	November 4, 2007	JABF16	Season 19; Episode 5
XVIII	405	"Mr. & Mrs. Simpson"	Mr. & Mrs. Smith	Chuck Sheetz	Marc Wilmore	November 4, 2007	JABF16	Season 19; Episode 5
XVIII	405	"Heck House"	N/A	Chuck Sheetz	Marc Wilmore	November 4, 2007	JABF16	Season 19; Episode 5
XIX	424	"Untitled Robot Parody"	Transformers	Bob Anderson	Matt Warburton	November 2, 2008	KABF16	Season 20; Episode 4
XIX	424	"How to Get Ahead in Dead-vertising"	Mad Men (intro) and celebrity advertising	Bob Anderson	Matt Warburton	November 2, 2008	KABF16	Season 20; Episode 4
XIX	424	"It's the Grand Pumpkin, Milhouse"	It's the Great Pumpkin, Charlie Brown	Bob Anderson	Matt Warburton	November 2, 2008	KABF16	Season 20; Episode 4
XX	445	"Dial 'M' for Murder or Press '#' to Return to Main Menu"	Strangers on a Train	Mike B. Anderson; Matthew Schofield	Daniel Chun	October 18, 2009	LABF14	Season 21; Episode 4
XX	445	"Don't Have a Cow, Mankind"	28 Days Later, I Am Legend and Children of Men	Mike B. Anderson; Matthew Schofield	Daniel Chun	October 18, 2009	LABF14	Season 21; Episode 4
XX	445	"There's No Business Like Moe Business"	Sweeney Todd: The Demon Barber of Fleet Street	Mike B. Anderson; Matthew Schofield	Daniel Chun	October 18, 2009	LABF14	Season 21; Episode 4
XXI	468	"War and Pieces"	Jumanji	Bob Anderson	Joel H. Cohen	November 7, 2010	MABF16	Season 22; Episode 4
XXI	468	"Master and Cadaver"	Dead Calm	Bob Anderson	Joel H. Cohen	November 7, 2010	MABF16	Season 22; Episode 4
XXI	468	"Tweenlight"	Twilight	Bob Anderson	Joel H. Cohen	November 7, 2010	MABF16	Season 22; Episode 4
XXII	489	"The Diving Bell and Butterball"	The Diving Bell and the Butterfly	Matthew Faughnan	Carolyn Omine	October 30, 2011	NABF19	Season 23; Episode 3
XXII	489	"Dial D for Diddly"	Dexter	Matthew Faughnan	Carolyn Omine	October 30, 2011	NABF19	Season 23; Episode 3
XXII	489	"In the Na'Vi"	Avatar	Matthew Faughnan	Carolyn Omine	October 30, 2011	NABF19	Season 23; Episode 3
XXIII	510	"The Greatest Story Ever Holed"	N/A	Steven Dean Moore	David Mandel & Brian Kelley	October 7, 2012	PABF17	Season 24; Episode 2
XXIII	510	"Un-normal Activity"	Paranormal Activity	Steven Dean Moore	David Mandel & Brian Kelley	October 7, 2012	PABF17	Season 24; Episode 2
XXIII	510	"Bart & Homer's Excellent Adventure"	Back to the Future	Steven Dean Moore	David Mandel & Brian Kelley	October 7, 2012	PABF17	Season 24; Episode 2
XXIV	532	"Oh the Places You'll D'oh"	Dr. Seuss works, specially The Cat in the Hat and Oh, the Places You'll Go!	Rob Oliver	Jeff Westbrook	October 6, 2013	RABF16	Season 25; Episode 2
XXIV	532	"Dead and Shoulders"	The Thing with Two Heads	Rob Oliver	Jeff Westbrook	October 6, 2013	RABF16	Season 25; Episode 2
XXIV	532	"Freaks no Geeks"	Freaks	Rob Oliver	Jeff Westbrook	October 6, 2013	RABF16	Season 25; Episode 2
XXV	556	"School is Hell"	N/A	Matthew Faughnan	Stephanie Gillis	October 19, 2014	SABF21	Season 26; Episode 4
XXV	556	"A Clockwork Yellow"	A Clockwork Orange	Matthew Faughnan	Stephanie Gillis	October 19, 2014	SABF21	Season 26; Episode 4
XXV	556	"The Others"	The Others	Matthew Faughnan	Stephanie Gillis	October 19, 2014	SABF21	Season 26; Episode 4
XXVI	579	"Wanted: Dead, Then Alive"	N/A	Steven Dean Moore	Joel H. Cohen	October 25, 2015	TABF18	Season 27; Episode 5
XXVI	579	"Homerzilla"	Godzilla	Steven Dean Moore	Joel H. Cohen	October 25, 2015	TABF18	Season 27; Episode 5
XXVI	579	"Telepaths of Glory"	Chronicle	Steven Dean Moore	Joel H. Cohen	October 25, 2015	TABF18	Season 27; Episode 5
XXVII	600	"Dry Hard"	The Hunger Games and Mad Max: Fury Road	Steven Dean Moore	Joel H. Cohen	October 16, 2016	VABF16	Season 28; Episode 4
XXVII	600	"BFF R.I.P"	N/A	Steven Dean Moore	Joel H. Cohen	October 16, 2016	VABF16	Season 28; Episode 4
XXVII	600	"Moefinger"	Goldfinger and Kingsman: The Secret Service	Steven Dean Moore	Joel H. Cohen	October 16, 2016	VABF16	Season 28; Episode 4
XXVIII	622	"The Sweets Hereafter"	Sausage Party	Timothy Bailey	John Frink	October 22, 2017	WABF18	Season 29; Episode 4
XXVIII	622	"The Exor-Sis"	The Exorcist	Timothy Bailey	John Frink	October 22, 2017	WABF18	Season 29; Episode 4
XXVIII	622	"Coralisa"	Coraline	Timothy Bailey	John Frink	October 22, 2017	WABF18	Season 29; Episode 4
XXVIII	622	"Mmm... Homer"	Survivor Type	Timothy Bailey	John Frink	October 22, 2017	WABF18	Season 29; Episode 4
XXIX	643	"Intrusion of the Pod-Y Switchers"	Invasion of the Body Snatchers	Matthew Faughnan	Joel H. Cohen	October 21, 2018	XABF16	Season 30; Episode 4
XXIX	643	"Multiplisa-ty"	Split	Matthew Faughnan	Joel H. Cohen	October 21, 2018	XABF16	Season 30; Episode 4
XXIX	643	"Geriatric Park"	Jurassic Park	Matthew Faughnan	Joel H. Cohen	October 21, 2018	XABF16	Season 30; Episode 4
XXX	666	"Prologue"	The Omen	Timothy Bailey	J. Stewart Burns	October 20, 2019	YABF18	Season 31; Episode 4
XXX	666	"Danger Things"	Stranger Things	Timothy Bailey	J. Stewart Burns	October 20, 2019	YABF18	Season 31; Episode 4
XXX	666	"Heaven Swipes Right"	Heaven Can Wait	Timothy Bailey	J. Stewart Burns	October 20, 2019	YABF18	Season 31; Episode 4
XXX	666	"When Hairy Met Slimy"	The Shape of Water	Timothy Bailey	J. Stewart Burns	October 20, 2019	YABF18	Season 31; Episode 4
Thanksgiving of Horror	670	"A-Gobble-Ypto"	Apocalypto	Rob Oliver	Dan Vebber	November 24, 2019	YABF17	Season 31; Episode 8
Thanksgiving of Horror	670	"The Fourth Thursday After Tomorrow"	"White Christmas"	Rob Oliver	Dan Vebber	November 24, 2019	YABF17	Season 31; Episode 8
Thanksgiving of Horror	670	"The Last Thanksgiving/The First Blarg-sgiving"	Alien	Rob Oliver	Dan Vebber	November 24, 2019	YABF17	Season 31; Episode 8
XXXI	688	"Toy Gory"	Toy Story	Steven Dean Moore	Julia Prescott	November 1, 2020	ZABF17	Season 32; Episode 4
XXXI	688	"Into the Homerverse"	Spider-Man: Into the Spider-Verse	Steven Dean Moore	Julia Prescott	November 1, 2020	ZABF17	Season 32; Episode 4
XXXI	688	"Be Nine, Rewind"	Russian Doll	Steven Dean Moore	Julia Prescott	November 1, 2020	ZABF17	Season 32; Episode 4
XXXII	709	"Barti"	Bambi	Matthew Faughnan	John Frink	October 10, 2021	QABF16	Season 33; Episode 3
XXXII	709	"Bong Joon Ho's 'This Side of Parasite'"	Parasite	Matthew Faughnan	John Frink	October 10, 2021	QABF16	Season 33; Episode 3
XXXII	709	"Nightmare on Elm Tree"	N/A	Matthew Faughnan	John Frink	October 10, 2021	QABF16	Season 33; Episode 3
XXXII	709	"Poetic Interlude (aka "The Telltale Bart")"	Artwork of Edward Gorey	Matthew Faughnan	John Frink	October 10, 2021	QABF16	Season 33; Episode 3
XXXII	709	"Dead Ringer"	The Ring and TikTok	Matthew Faughnan	John Frink	October 10, 2021	QABF16	Season 33; Episode 3
Not It	733	"Treehouse of Horror Presents: Not It"	It	Steven Dean Moore	Cesar Mazariegos	October 23, 2022	UABF17	Season 34; Episode 5
Not It	733	"Not It: Part Two"	It Chapter Two	Steven Dean Moore	Cesar Mazariegos	October 23, 2022	UABF17	Season 34; Episode 5
XXXIII	734	"The Pookadook"	The Babadook	Rob Oliver	Carolyn Omine	October 30, 2022	UABF18	Season 34; Episode 6
XXXIII	734	"Death Tome"	Death Note	Rob Oliver	Ryan Koh	October 30, 2022	UABF18	Season 34; Episode 6
XXXIII	734	"Simpsons World"	Westworld	Rob Oliver	Matt Selman	October 30, 2022	UABF18	Season 34; Episode 6
XXXIV	755	"Wild Barts Can't Be Token"	Snowpiercer and non-fungible tokens	Rob Oliver	Jeff Westbrook	November 5, 2023	OABF17	Season 35; Episode 5
XXXIV	755	"Ei8ht"	Seven and The Silence of the Lambs	Rob Oliver	Jessica Conrad	November 5, 2023	OABF17	Season 35; Episode 5
XXXIV	755	"Lout Break"	Outbreak	Rob Oliver	Dan Vebber	November 5, 2023	OABF17	Season 35; Episode 5
XXXV	773	"The Information Rage"	Pacific Rim	Timothy Bailey	Rob LaZebnik	November 3, 2024	35ABF13	Season 36; Episode 5
XXXV	773	"The Fall of the House of Monty"	Winchester and "The Fall of the House of Usher"	Timothy Bailey	Dan Vebber	November 3, 2024	35ABF13	Season 36; Episode 5
XXXV	773	"Denim"	Venom	Timothy Bailey	Matt Selman	November 3, 2024	35ABF13	Season 36; Episode 5
Simpsons Wicked This Way Comes	775	"Wraparounds"	The Illustrated Man	Debbie Bruce Mahan	Jessica Conrad	November 24, 2024	35ABF14	Season 36; Episode 7
Simpsons Wicked This Way Comes	775	"Story #1"	"The Screaming Woman"	Debbie Bruce Mahan	Jessica Conrad	November 24, 2024	35ABF14	Season 36; Episode 7
Simpsons Wicked This Way Comes	775	"Story #2"	"Marionettes, Inc."	Debbie Bruce Mahan	Jessica Conrad	November 24, 2024	35ABF14	Season 36; Episode 7
Simpsons Wicked This Way Comes	775	"Story #3"	Fahrenheit 451	Debbie Bruce Mahan	Jessica Conrad	November 24, 2024	35ABF14	Season 36; Episode 7
XXXVI	793	"The Last Days of Crisco"	Jaws and The Blob	Matthew Faughnan	Broti Gupta	October 19, 2025	36ABF15	Season 37; Episode 3
XXXVI	793	"Clown Night with the Devil"	Late Night with the Devil	Matthew Faughnan	Michael Price	October 19, 2025	36ABF15	Season 37; Episode 3
XXXVI	793	"Plastic World"	Waterworld and Furiosa: A Mad Max Saga	Matthew Faughnan	Dan Greaney	October 19, 2025	36ABF15	Season 37; Episode 3
The Revengening	812	"Treehouse of Horror Presents: The Revengening"	I Know What You Did Last Summer	Eddie Rosas	Nick Dahan	October 18, 2026	37ABF13	Season 38; Episode 3
XXXVII	813	"Prologue"	The Nightmare Before Christmas	David Silverman	David Silverman	October 25, 2026	37ABF14	Season 38; Episode 4
XXXVII	813	"Bride's Shed Revisited"	The Husbands by Holly Gramazio	David Silverman	Joel H. Cohen	October 25, 2026	37ABF14	Season 38; Episode 4
XXXVII	813	"Dog Boy Afternoon"	Freaky Friday and Pet Sematary	David Silverman	Jessica Conrad	October 25, 2026	37ABF14	Season 38; Episode 4
XXXVII	813	"Vehicular Dad Slaughter"	Driver's education films	David Silverman	Tim Long	October 25, 2026	37ABF14	Season 38; Episode 4
XXXVIII	8??	TBA	N/A	TBD	Loni Steele Sosthand	Upcoming	38ABF07	TBA
XXXVIII	8??	TBA	N/A	TBD	N/A	Upcoming	38ABF07	TBA
XXXVIII	8??	TBA	N/A	TBD	N/A	Upcoming	38ABF07	TBA

== Bibliography ==
- Gimple, Scott M.; Matt Groening (December 1, 1999). The Simpsons Forever!: A Complete Guide to Our Favorite Family ...Continued. HarperCollins. ISBN 978-0-06-098763-3.
- Groening, Matt (1997). Richmond, Ray; Coffman, Antonia (eds.). The Simpsons: A Complete Guide to Our Favorite Family (1st ed.). New York: HarperPerennial. ISBN 978-0-06-095252-5. LCCN 98141857. OCLC 37796735. OL 433519M.
- McCann, Jesse L.; Matt Groening (2002). The Simpsons Beyond Forever!: A Complete Guide to Our Favorite Family ...Still Continued. HarperCollins. ISBN 0-06-050592-3.
- McCann, Jesse L.; Matt Groening (2005). The Simpsons One Step Beyond Forever!: A Complete Guide to Our Favorite Family ...Continued Yet Again. HarperCollins. ISBN 0-06-081754-2.
- Turner, Chris (2004). Planet Simpson: How a Cartoon Masterpiece Documented an Era and Defined a Generation. Foreword by Douglas Coupland. (1st ed.). Toronto: Random House Canada. ISBN 978-0-679-31318-2. OCLC 55682258.
