= Women in Shorts =

- The Simpsons episode
- Episode no.: Season 36; Episode 6
- Directed by: Eric Koenig
- Written by: Christine Nangle
- Production code: 35ABF17
- Original air date: November 10, 2024

Guest appearances
- Ruth Reichl as herself; Kerry Washington as Rayshelle Peyton

Episode features
- Chalkboard gag: "I will not get detention just to practice cursive" (written by Lisa)
- Couch gag: Marge and other women of Springfield force Kirk Van Houten off his couch so they can gather around for their book club.

Episode chronology
← Previous "Treehouse of Horror XXXV"	Next → "Treehouse of Horror Presents: Simpsons Wicked This Way Comes"
- The Simpsons season 36

"Women in Shorts" is the sixth episode of the thirty-sixth season of the American animated television series The Simpsons, and the 774th episode overall. It aired in the United States on Fox on November 10, 2024. The episode was written by Christine Nangle and directed by Eric Koenig.

In this episode, multiple short stories are told about the women of Springfield. Kerry Washington guest starred as Rayshelle Peyton. Food writer Ruth Reichl appeared as herself. The episode received positive reviews.

== Plot ==
=== Luann Van Houten's Story ===
The women hold an intervention for Luann Van Houten. They are worried about her addiction to wine merchandise. They suggest other items, and she settles for merchandise saying she is a "proud slut".

=== Malibu Stacy's Story ===
In a parody of the film Barbie, Malibu Stacy leaves Malibu Stacy Land for the real world. She greets Shauna Chalmers and claims she is her doll and is here to help her. Embarrassed, Shauna assaults and decapitates her. Before kicking her head away, Shauna asks Malibu Stacy to meet her for tea after school. Her head rolls onto the road where it frightens Waylon Smithers.

=== Mrs. Muntz' Story ===
Mrs. Muntz tells Nelson a bedtime story about Princess Muntzeena who dances for men. When Princess Rylee dances to Muntzeena's song, she throws her shoe at Rylee's face. The doorman banishes Rylee to the morning shift.

=== Marge Simpson's Story ===
At the store checkout line, Marge asks Homer to retrieve tampons. Uncomfortable with the task, the store clerks remind Homer, in a musical number that parodies "Gee, Officer Krupke" from West Side Story, that Marge always buys products to treat Homer's ailments.

=== Patty and Selma's Story ===
When Patty and Selma learn of a cigarette shortage, they agree to share their supply. They both say they have none. Suspicious, they tear apart their apartment to reveal all their hiding places.

=== Bernice Hibbert's Story ===
Bernice Hibbert and Dr. Hibbert are on a date at a restaurant where they are role-playing. Bernice becomes angry when someone starts choking and Julius wants to help.

=== Mrs. Risotto's Story ===
Luigi Risotto has been arrested for smuggling diamonds in cheese gnocchi. In the intro that parodies the opening credits to The Nanny, his mother Mrs. Risotto becomes a lawyer after his arrest. She successfully defends him at a trial overseen by Judge Roy Snyder where she gave the jury some of her food and he is freed.

=== Lunchlady Dora's Story ===
Lunchlady Dora shops for ingredients for school lunches. With a limited budget, she finds the cheapest items and uses them to cook the same meal under different names.

=== Lisa Simpson's Story ===
Lisa dreams of being a queen in The Chronicles of Narnia. She decrees improvements to the kingdom, but her subjects do not want an increase in taxes to pay for them with some of them offensive towards mermaids and witches. Her subjects then attack her with a centaur version of Homer accidentally getting beheaded. Lisa wakes up stating that she even can't have fun in her dreams.

=== Agnes Skinner's Story ===
Agnes Skinner opens a social media app on her phone to record a video. She is lonely after her long-time enemy died and is looking for a new one.

=== Helen Lovejoy's Story ===
Helen Lovejoy hears on the radio that a tsunami is imminent. Fulfilling her wishes, she punches Ned Flanders, kisses Moe Szyslak, and destroys Reverend Lovejoy's model trains. The broadcast clarifies the alert is for a department store sale. Embarrassed by her actions, Helen tells Reverend Lovejoy that he has a good hobby.

=== Rayshelle Peyton's Story ===
At Springfield Elementary School, Superintendent Chalmers, Dewey Largo, Brunella Pommelhorst, Coach Krupt, and Lunchlady Dora bets on bad things happening to the students. Although Ms. Peyton discourages their behavior, she wins the bet of Lisa giving the finger according to Groundskeeper Willie's surveillance. She gives a share of the winnings to Lisa, who uses it to buy a jazz album. She passes different people and dodges a mermaid as it shows Homer dancing in a chorus line.

=== Credits ===
Twenty-one months earlier in the style of a movie trailer as the credits roll, a television commercial arouses Marge leading to the conception of Maggie Simpson.

== Production ==
The episode was written by Christine Nangle, who had a background in sketch comedy. Executive producer Matt Selman encouraged the writers to take more risks, so she wrote an episode that felt like a sketch show featuring the women of Springfield, which is why Lisa is shown performing the chalkboard gag instead of Bart. Nangle compared the episode to the thirty-fourth season episode "Lisa the Boy Scout". The vignette style of the episode was also featured in the seventh season episode "22 Short Films About Springfield". This is the first episode of the series directed by Eric Koenig. Producer Brian Kelley served as co-showrunner.

The musical number "Incompetent Husband" was written by series composer Kara Talve and featured Dawnn Lewis and Tony Rodriguez as store clerks.

Kerry Washington reprised her role as Rayshelle Peyton. She first appeared in this role in the thirty-third season episode "My Octopus and a Teacher". Food writer Ruth Reichl appeared as herself.

This episode was originally called "Ladies Night".

== Reception ==
=== Viewing figures ===
The episode earned a 0.22 rating and was watched by 0.83 million viewers, which was the most-watched show on Fox that night. It garnered a total of 0.83 million viewers and is the lowest-rated episode of the season. According to Cathal Gunning of Screen Rant, "However, 'Women in Shorts' not only failed to replicate the success of the Treehouse of Horror episodes, but it became one of the least-watched episodes of the series."

=== Critical response ===
John Schwarz of Bubbleblabber gave the episode a 7.5 out of 10. He liked the stories for Mama Risotto and Lunchlady Dora and highlighted the detailed animation during Agnes' selfie video. Although he liked the break from regular episodes, he also thought there was nothing that stood out like other format breaking episodes. Mike Celestino of Laughing Place was surprised the series did not follow up on "22 Short Films About Springfield" until now. He thought it "was a sharp, spry, energetic episode that pleasantly hearkened back to one the series' highest points" and wanted the format to appear more often.

Brandon Zachary of Screen Rant singled out Nelson and his mother's story as the most heartwarming, stating, "Nelson has always had some of the saddest stories on The Simpsons, so it's very touching to see him and his mom get along so well." He concluded, "The sweetest is the one between Nelson and his mom, as it gives the sad, extended subplot a sweet chapter for once and highlights the genuine, loving bond between them. The result is one of the most enjoyable plot points so far in The Simpsons' 36th season and a reminder of the emotional core that drives the entire series." Nick Valdez of Comicbook.com ranked the episode fifth on his list of all the episodes of the season. He praised it for being the most experimental episode of the season, stating, "Each of them gets a short moment that results in a funny or wild kind of sketch, and it’s certainly such a unique experience. Especially for fans of these characters who rarely get the spotlight."
