= Marionettes, Inc. =

1949 short story by Ray Bradbury

"Marionettes, Inc." is a short story by American writer Ray Bradbury, originally published in Startling Stories (March 1949) and later reprinted in his collection of short stories The Illustrated Man. The story follows a conflict between man and machine and depicts the human dependence on technology, a common theme for Bradbury's stories.

== Plot summary ==
In 1990, friends Braling and Smith take a walk one evening, much to the surprise of the latter, as Braling's wife generally tries to keep him from doing things he enjoys. Braling reveals to Smith that he has been using a robot duplicate of himself, Braling Two, to fulfill his obligations as a husband while he pursues his personal interests. His wife is completely unaware of the duplication. He plans to visit Rio de Janeiro for a month while his robot covers for him at home.

Smith, fascinated by this new (and technically illegal) technology, considers buying a duplicate to deal with his own wife, Nettie, who in the last month has been overly affectionate. Braling gives him a contact card for Marionettes, Inc. Smith goes home and finds his wife sleeping. He briefly wrestles with the ethics of deceiving his wife before getting out his bankbook to set aside the $8,000 he would need to purchase the duplicate. To his surprise, Smith finds that $10,000 is missing from their account. He checks the sleeping Nettie and realizes that she is a robot duplicate of his wife.

When Braling tries to return home and hide Braling Two, the robot resists him, expressing a love for his wife. Realizing that the duplicate is trying to replace him, Braling panics, only to be locked in a box by Braling Two. The story ends ambiguously in the Bralings' bedroom with "someone", presumably Braling Two, kissing Mrs. Braling affectionately.

== Adaptations ==
The short story was adapted for the radio programs Dimension X on August 30, 1951, and X Minus One on December 21, 1955, and for television as a fourth-season episode of Alfred Hitchcock Presents (titled "Design for Loving") and a first-season episode of The Ray Bradbury Theater (under the original title).

In the 1966 Televisión Española's anthology Historias para no dormir, Chicho Ibáñez Serrador adapted the short story in the Season 1 episode El doble (The double). This version makes clear that the robot duplicates dispose of their human "originals" in order to replace them. Rodrigo Sorogoyen worked on a modern version for Amazon Prime Video and Televisión Española for the 2021 reboot of the series. Who survives is left unclear in this version.

The story has most recently been adapted on BBC Radio 4 as part of The Illustrated Man production on the Dangerous Visions series, broadcast on June 14, 2014, and starring Iain Glen as "The Illustrated Man".

The story’s plot and concepts were loosely adapted into "Happy Holo-Ween", the sixth episode of season 21 of Family Guy.

It is also referenced in "Treehouse of Horror Presents: Simpsons Wicked This Way Comes", the seventh episode of season 36 of The Simpsons.
