= Desperately Seeking Lisa =

- The Simpsons episode
- Episode no.: Season 36; Episode 3
- Directed by: Matthew Nastuk
- Written by: Tim Long
- Production code: 35ABF18
- Original air date: October 20, 2024

Guest appearances
- Griffin Dunne as Cockroach Actor; Richard E. Grant as Julian, British Voice; Tracy Letts as himself; Molly Shannon as Katya

Episode chronology
← Previous "The Yellow Lotus"	Next → "Shoddy Heat"
- The Simpsons season 36

"Desperately Seeking Lisa" is the third episode of the thirty-sixth season of the American animated television series The Simpsons, and the 771st episode overall. It aired in the United States on Fox on October 20, 2024. The episode was written by Tim Long and directed by Matthew Nastuk.

In this episode, Lisa spends a weekend in Capital City with Patty and Selma and has an adventure with a group of artists. Griffin Dunne, Richard E. Grant, and Molly Shannon guest starred. Tracy Letts appeared as himself. The episode received positive reviews.

== Plot ==
When Marge tires of Lisa's complaints about Springfield, she decides to have Lisa accompany Patty and Selma to Capital City for the weekend.

In the city, Lisa wants to see the Fearless Girl statue and says there is an artist balloon parade tomorrow that she wants to see. They dine at Patty and Selma's favorite restaurant and encounter Patty's artist friends Julian and Katya who invite them to a party in their loft. They decline because they are going to a musical that Lisa is reluctant to see. Later, Patty and Selma get food poisoning and go to sleep, so Lisa decides to join Patty's friends by herself.

Lisa is impressed by the art at the party and bonds with Katya. She helps the artists move the art to a gallery for a showing. At 1 AM, she encounters Superintendent Chalmers, who is having a romantic getaway with Lunchlady Dora. Lisa and the artists see a play about a man, who becomes a cockroach, and his abusive father. Lisa defends the cockroach. The play's author, Tracy Letts, is impressed that Lisa interrupted the play and offers Lisa a place at an expensive fine arts academy. Because Lisa's family cannot afford the tuition, the artists suggest going to a senile rich woman who can offer a scholarship.

At 3:30 AM, she interviews Lisa and writes a check for her. Back at the loft, she notices a photo of the artists with Martin Prince, and they reveal that they used her to steal money from the woman to fund themselves. She threatens to report them to the police, but they already framed her as a thief when she moved the art earlier. She takes the check and runs.

She encounters Chalmers, who is now on a romantic getaway with Elizabeth Hoover, so Lisa forces him to hide her. When Dora finds them, Chalmers and Lisa escape with Chalmers riding his bicycle into the river. Lisa can't contact her family as they are busy watching a ringtone documentary.

At 6:30 AM, she finds the Fearless Girl statue but declares that she hates the city when she sees it was donated by Goldman Sachs. As the artists catch up with her, Lisa hides under an uninflated balloon from the artist parade. She becomes trapped on the balloon when she accidentally inflates it. Lisa tears apart the check, so Julian tells Katya to use a knife to deflate the balloon to retrieve her. Instead, she cuts the balloon loose, allowing Lisa to float home to Springfield where her lack of sleep has her hearing the balloon talk.

Arriving back in Springfield, Lisa enters Springfield Elementary School and addresses a saddened Superintendent Chalmers as an angered Elizabeth and Dora walk by him.

During the credits, Lisa and her classmates read a story about a firecracker that was afraid of noise.

== Production ==
The episode was written by Tim Long, who also served as co-showrunner for the episode. Executive producer Matt Selman described the episode as "a love letter to 80s downtown New York" and compared it to the 1985 films After Hours and Desperately Seeking Susan. He felt the episode could only be done on a series that had already aired over 700 episodes due to its specificity about a certain time period.

Richard E. Grant guest starred as Julian and Molly Shannon guest starred as Katya. Griffin Dunne, who starred in After Hours, also guest starred as the cockroach actor. Actor and playwright Tracy Letts appeared as himself.

Two clips from the episode were shown the day before the episode aired at New York Comic Con.

== Release ==
The episode aired simultaneously in the United States in all time zones at 8:30 PM ET/5:30 PM PT following a special episode of the television series Universal Basic Guys.

== Reception ==
=== Viewing figures ===
The episode earned a 0.61 rating and was watched by 2.02 million viewers, which was the second most-watched show on Fox that night.

=== Critical response ===
John Schwarz of Bubbleblabber gave the episode a 9 out of 10. He highlighted the performance by Tracy Letts and director Matthew Nastuk's attention to detail in animating Capital City. He also liked the mix between Lisa's voice, which could "feel like nails on a chalkboard", with the rest of the Capital City characters. Mike Celestino of Laughing Place liked the first half of the episode, but he called the second half "ungrounded" and thought it may have been a dream sequence. He highlighted the joke of the Simpsons family watching a ringtone documentary that prevents them from hearing Lisa's call for help.

Cathal Gunning of Screen Rant called the episode's entire focus on Lisa "a daring approach". He liked it demonstrated the continued trend of the series having more "inventive" episodes as the series continues. Nick Valdez of Comicbook.com ranked the episode 18th on his list of all the episodes of the season. He said it was a "pretty solid" episode but also felt it was too reminiscent of episodes from previous seasons. He concluded, "It comes on the heels of two experimental episodes that kicked off the season, so it's almost too much of a return to the norm to end up at the bottom of this list. It's just there."
