= Bart's Birthday =

- The Simpsons episode
- Episode no.: Season 36; Episode 1
- Directed by: Rob Oliver
- Written by: Jessica Conrad
- Production code: 35ABF15
- Original air date: September 29, 2024

Guest appearances
- John Cena as himself; Danny DeVito as Herb Powell; Tom Hanks as himself; Joel McHale as himself; Conan O'Brien as himself; Mark Proksch as Hack-GPT; Seth Rogen as himself; Amy Sedaris as Maggie Simpson (speaking voice)

Episode chronology
← Previous "Bart's Brain"	Next → "The Yellow Lotus"
- The Simpsons season 36

"Bart's Birthday", titled onscreen as "The Simpsons Series Finale" is the thirty-sixth season premiere of the American animated television series The Simpsons, and the 769th episode overall. It aired in the United States on Fox on September 29, 2024. The episode was written by Jessica Conrad and directed by Rob Oliver.

In this episode, celebrities attend a presentation of the series finale of The Simpsons in which Bart believes something is changing with his world. The idea for the episode came as a response to people asking executive producer Matt Selman when and how the series would end. John Cena, Danny DeVito, Tom Hanks, Joel McHale, Conan O'Brien, Mark Proksch, Seth Rogen, and Amy Sedaris guest starred. The episode received positive reviews.

== Plot ==
Former celebrity guest stars on The Simpsons attend a celebration of the series finale, hosted by Conan O'Brien. He explains that Fox has been trying to end the series for decades and shows off alternate versions of classic episodes that would have ended the series by killing Homer. He tasks an artificial intelligence chatbot called Hack-GPT to generate a series finale.

The plot revolves around Bart needing to distribute his birthday party invitations after Homer forgets to mail them. He passes them out at a school assembly, where Principal Skinner announces he is leaving for a new job, to Bart's delight. Meanwhile at the power plant, Mr. Burns pretends to be dead and has a joke will that leaves his fortune to them. When Homer accidentally kills him, allowing the will to be enacted, the employees cheer and carry Homer out.

Bart witnesses John Cena deliver Kumiko and Comic Book Guy's baby. He finds it strange seeing numerous people saying they will "miss this place" before turning off the lights and closing their doors. He discusses this with Milhouse, whose parents announce they are leaving Springfield. Multiple marriages occur at once. Raphael turns off the Springfield Tire Fire.

At home, Homer and Marge announce that they have permanently fixed their relationship, and the Simpson family will cease to be dysfunctional. As Maggie says her first words, Bart realizes everything is changing and runs out of the house. The celebrities are confused, and Hack-GPT explains that Bart has become self-aware and is rejecting the finale.

After seeing more changes around town, Bart goes to a taping of Krusty's show, which is filming its series finale. Bart tries to prevent it from airing, which lands him in jail. Bart is bailed out as Chief Wiggum mentions he is also leaving.

Bart's family takes him home as Lisa tries to comfort him. The townsfolk throw him a surprise 11th birthday party, horrifying Bart. He refuses to blow out his birthday cake candles, pointing out that many of the characters' "happy endings" do not make sense and that Bleeding Gums Murphy, Frank Grimes, and Rabbi Hyman Krustofsky are dead (despite attending the party). Bart provokes Homer into strangling him, which disrupts the finale and changes it to a scene of Bart's 10th birthday party.

O'Brien is moved that Bart overcame Hack-GPT's designed finale and reset the series. He announces that this is only a season premiere. When O'Brien asks Hack-GPT if it can create another 800 episodes, it explodes, causing the celebrities to flee. O'Brien leaves stating he is not going to miss this place.

== Production ==
=== Development ===
Executive producer Matt Selman thought that The Simpsons could not have a series finale because the show reset at the end of each episode and does not have canon or continuity. As a result, when asked about it by the press, he could not give an answer. However, when asked this question while in Australia, he thought about an episode with a fake finale and developed the idea with episode co-showrunner Michael Price and writer Jessica Conrad. They considered what Fox would do for a real finale and conceived a celebration with celebrities in attendance. The episode was inspired by the seventh season episode "The Simpsons 138th Episode Spectacular". Selman also compared the episode to the thirty-fourth season episode "Lisa the Boy Scout", and Price compared it with the eighth season episode "The Simpsons Spin-Off Showcase". The creators also used the episode to comment on art generated from artificial intelligence, which was a topic of concern during the 2023 Hollywood labor disputes. The original artificial intelligence generated finale episode was going to have Bart performing the "greatest prank," but executive producer James L. Brooks suggested a birthday party.

The creators wanted to mock fans by including a scene with the real Seymour Skinner from the ninth season episode "The Principal and the Pauper" and to also mock the media, who now only discuss the series for think pieces, by having Homer strangle Bart, which became a topic after the episode "McMansion & Wife" aired the previous season. The script called for the strangling scene to be animated in the violent style of the early seasons as done by David Silverman, so he animated the scene himself.

=== Casting ===
Former series writer Conan O'Brien appeared as himself. The writers wanted someone who could "poke fun" at fans from the early seasons of the show who would serve the same role that Troy McClure filled in "The Simpsons 138th Episode Spectacular". The host role was written for O'Brien, and Selman said he was "smart enough and funny enough" to know why he was chosen. O'Brien previously appeared as himself in the fifth season episode "Bart Gets Famous".

Amy Sedaris voiced Maggie Simpson. Nancy Cartwright originally voiced her for the episode, but when Selman saw an opportunity for another joke, Sedaris was brought in, and she recorded the line on the Thursday before the episode aired. Mark Proksch voiced the artificial intelligence Hack-GPT. He also recorded his role the week before the episode aired.

Actor Tom Hanks reprised his role as himself from The Simpsons Movie. Hanks ad-libbed his line where he tells Ron Howard to move. Danny DeVito reprised his role as Herb Powell. DeVito originated his role in the second season episode "Oh Brother, Where Art Thou?". Actor John Cena appeared as himself. Selman said his appearance is the type of stunt casting that a finale would have. Actor Joel McHale also appeared as himself.

Actor Seth Rogen reprised his role as himself, reusing a recorded laugh from a previous episode that required clearance. Rogen previously appeared as himself in the twenty-fifth season episode "Steal This Episode". The other non-speaking celebrities appeared without permission and were not paid, and Fox's legal department had the writers give O'Brien a line explaining this.

A part was also written for former President of the United States Barack Obama where he would make a tribute to the series by joking about how the show feels like being president with all the "bad stuff" that follows it, but he was not available due to being busy with his support to Kamala Harris during the 2024 United States presidential election.

== Cultural references ==
The depiction of characters turning off the lights and leaving a room is a reference to the ending of the television series The Mary Tyler Moore Show where Mary does the same thing as well as the ending of the television series Cheers.

The end credits feature images parodying the series finales of The Sopranos, M*A*S*H, Mad Men, The Mary Tyler Moore Show, Breaking Bad, Game of Thrones, Frasier, Succession, and Newhart. In the Frasier parody Sideshow Bob has taken the place of Frasier Crane played by Kelsey Grammer who is also the voice of Sideshow Bob on The Simpsons. The montage includes an instrumental version of "They'll Never Stop the Simpsons", which was written by Selman, from the thirteenth season episode "Gump Roast", which is a parody of the Billy Joel song "We Didn't Start the Fire".

Tom Hanks addresses Ron Howard as Opie, his character from The Andy Griffith Show.

The episode contains many references to O'Brien's career and his programs Late Night, The Tonight Show, and Conan, as well as to current Fox shows Animal Control, The Masked Singer, and Farmer Wants a Wife.

Hack-GPT is a parody of artificial intelligence chatbot ChatGPT. Series mentioned as having good finales include Breaking Bad and Mad Men, while shows with poorly received finales include Seinfeld and Lost. The divisive finale to The Sopranos is described as both good and bad. A ride called "Homer Simpson's Claim-Jumping, Yukon-Rumbling Rock-N-Rollercoaster" is mentioned as being planned at Disneyland Shanghai.

Bart mentions that the Sea Captain is trying to get cast on a revival of The Love Boat. O'Brien refers to Hanks as his "bosom buddy".

== Reception ==
=== Viewing figures ===
The episode earned a 0.33 rating and was watched by 1.08 million viewers, the most-watched show on Fox that night.

=== Critical response ===
John Schwarz of Bubbleblabber gave the episode a 7.5 out of 10. He liked the premise of the show making fun of "everyone and everything", including the entertainment industry. However, he felt that the commentary could have been sharper if the series was not owned by Disney. Mike Celestino of Laughing Place called the episode "a pretty clever way to hang a lampshade" on how anyone involved with the series will be able to end the show.

Daniel Fienberg of The Hollywood Reporter named the episode as one of his favorite television episodes of 2024. He said that the show proved it "still has creative juice" and that the show would not have a better ending when the time came for a true series finale. Nick Valdez of Comicbook.com ranked the episode second on his list of all the episodes of the season. He felt that the episode made the series "openly defy the fact that its finale seemed to be coming year after year." He concluded, "But at the same time, it was clear the show wasn't going to lose steam anytime soon. Longtime fans couldn't have asked for a better start to the season."

=== Awards and nominations ===
The episode was nominated for the Primetime Emmy Award for Outstanding Animated Program at the 77th Primetime Creative Arts Emmy Awards.

Writer Jessica Conrad was nominated for the Annie Award for Outstanding Achievement for Writing in an Animated Television/Broadcast Production at the 52nd Annie Awards for her script for this episode.
