= Homer and Her Sisters =

- The Simpsons episode
- Episode no.: Season 36; Episode 9
- Directed by: Matthew Nastuk
- Written by: Nick Dahan
- Production code: 36ABF03
- Original air date: December 15, 2024

Guest appearances
- Susie Essman as Aunt Sadie; Ike Barinholtz as Wayne the Grip; Jay Pharoah as Drederick Tatum

Episode chronology
← Previous "Convenience Airways"	Next → "O C'mon All Ye Faithful"
- The Simpsons season 36

"Homer and Her Sisters" is the ninth episode of the thirty-sixth season of the American animated television series The Simpsons, and the 777th episode overall. It aired in the United States on Fox on December 15, 2024. The episode was written by Nick Dahan and directed by Matthew Nastuk.

In this episode, Krusty's Aunt Sadie tries to resolve the relationship issues between Homer and Marge's sisters while Krusty tries to socialize with his show's crew. Susie Essman guest starred as Aunt Sadie, and Ike Barinholtz guest starred as Wayne the Grip. Maggie Simpson does not appear in the episode. The episode received mixed reviews.

== Plot ==
For Patty and Selma's birthday party, the Simpsons and the twins attempt to solve an escape room. Patty and Selma, who have never failed to escape, argue with Homer while Marge tries to mediate the situation. When they fail because Homer kept the escape key away from them, Marge is unable to stop Patty and Selma from attacking Homer. Meanwhile, Krusty's Aunt Sadie visits him when she is invited to be a guest on his show's rewatch podcast. Sadie notices that he does not recognize the crew members who host the podcast, and he is not interested in socializing with them outside of work. She berates Krusty and says he is the problem. Lindsay Naegle, listening to the podcast, is inspired to create a reality show starring Sadie to fix relationships. Marge signs up for the show to fix Homer, Patty, and Selma's relationship.

On the show, they explain how their hatred intensified at the baby shower for Bart. Homer bought a chocolate cake, claiming to be his and Marge's favorite, but Patty and Selma told him to get a carrot cake. As they fought, Marge decided to keep them separated in the future. Sadie asks what is Marge's favorite cake, and she says vanilla. Sadie says Marge is the problem and that they would resolve their issues if Marge does not interfere. She says Marge does it to be the martyr in their relationship. Considering what Sadie said, Homer, Patty, and Selma attempt to have a secret friendship where they make fun of each other's appearance. When Marge discovers them, she thinks it was truly her fault. Meanwhile, Krusty ingratiates himself with Wayne the Grip from his show's crew and is invited to his party.

Attending the party, Krusty acts awkwardly and injures himself riding an all-terrain vehicle. Meanwhile, Marge becomes depressed and stays away from Homer, Patty, and Selma as they have fun. Homer, Marge, and the twins film the reunion special for Sadie's show. They point out each other's flaws until they start arguing. Marge berates Sadie for trying to give them an easy fix and says that hard work is needed to fix relationships. Marge declares she is not the problem, and Krusty agrees with her regarding his own issues. As the other participants on the show leave the reunion set, Drederick Tatum's tiger accidentally causes a sign to fall on Sadie and kill her.

Krusty is among those that attend Sadie's funeral. When Wayne the Grip makes a comment, Krusty retaliates as Wayne quotes "That's the Krusty I know".

== Production ==
Susie Essman guest starred as Aunt Sadie, and Ike Barinholtz guest starred as Wayne the Grip.

== Release ==
The episode aired simultaneously in all United States time zones at 8:30 PM ET/5:30 PM PT following a special episode of the television series Universal Basic Guys.

== Cultural references ==
The episode title refers to Woody Allen's comedy-drama film Hannah and Her Sisters (1986).

== Reception ==
=== Viewing figures ===
Leading out of an NFL doubleheader and Universal Basic Guys, the episode earned a 0.40 rating and was watched by 1.47 million viewers, which was the second-most watched show on Fox that night.

=== Critical response ===
John Schwarz of Bubbleblabber gave the episode a 6 out of 10. He highlighted the performance by Susie Essman but would have preferred the focus of the episode be on Krusty and Sideshow Mel's podcast instead of Homer, Patty, and Selma. He thought stories focusing on that relationship "has been done to death". Mike Celestino of Laughing Place liked the story and compared the "dark" ending to the eighth season episode "Homer's Enemy". He highlighted the episode's animation but thought the depiction of Homer's fingernails to be "kind of gross and off-putting".

Cathal Gunning of Screen Rant highlighted the death of Krusty's aunt Sadie, saying, "The Simpsons has been flexing the rules of the show's writing style and, more specifically, experimenting with its usual format since Season 34." Nick Valdez of Comicbook.com ranked the episode number 14 on his list of all episodes of the season. He praised the character combination of Homer, Patty, and Selma, saying, "It's a charming episode, but largely unmemorable compared to some of the season's most successful."
