= Treehouse of Horror XXXV =

- The Simpsons episode
- Promotional poster for the episode
- Episode no.: Season 36; Episode 5
- Directed by: Timothy Bailey
- Written by: Rob LaZebnik ("The Information Rage"); Dan Vebber ("The Fall of the House of Monty"); Matt Selman ("Denim")
- Production code: 35ABF13
- Original air date: November 3, 2024
- Running time: 23 minutes

Episode chronology
← Previous "Shoddy Heat"	Next → "Women in Shorts"
- The Simpsons season 36

"Treehouse of Horror XXXV" is the fifth episode of the thirty-sixth season of the American animated television series The Simpsons. It originally aired in the United States on the Fox Network on November 3, 2024. As with previous installments, the special consists of three Halloween-themed, self-contained segments, each being written by Matt Selman, Dan Vebber, and Rob LaZebnik. The entire episode was directed by Timothy Bailey.

The series follows the dysfunctional Simpson family, consisting of patriarch Homer (Dan Castellaneta), matriarch Marge (Julie Kavner), son Bart (Nancy Cartwright), oldest daughter Lisa (Yeardley Smith), and youngest Maggie, as they live out their misadventures in the town of Springfield. The episode's three segments focus on kaiju monsters attacking Springfield, Mr. Burns (Harry Shearer) being haunted by the ghosts of his former workers, and a sentient pair of denim jeans helping Homer win over Marge.

The episode opens with a sequence directed by Jorge R. Gutiérrez, inspired by his 2014 film The Book of Life. Gutiérrez was given free rein with the short, and asserted that he was a fan of The Simpsons. Despite not usually going for political humor, LaZebnik was still interested in exploring how social media affected people's views for the first segment, and Vebber was inspired by his enjoyment of 1950s horror films for the second segment. The final segment, "Denim", was animated by Stoopid Buddy Stoodios, and came from a concept Selman pitched years prior. Upon release, the episode received generally positive reviews from critics, with "The Fall of the House of Monty" being the most acclaimed segment.

== Plot ==
=== "The Information Rage" ===
The town of Springfield is given free LED lightbulbs due to young Lisa Simpson's advocacy. Its residents are initially happy, but the conservative half of town becomes enraged when they learn this idea is progressive. Soon, two kaiju monsters rise from the sea, attacking the liberal and conservative parts of Springfield. Scientist Professor Frink creates a large robot to stop them, and Lisa, along with her brother Bart, operate it, but fail. As more kaiju representing different political figures and platforms appear, Bart and Lisa work together and chase them away. They warn the town to embrace commonality and not give in to division, but a more powerful kaiju soon emerges and destroys the town.

=== "The Fall of the House of Monty" ===
In the Victorian era, tycoon Mr. Burns invites his factory workers over for Thanksgiving dinner. He promises they can dine if someone can defeat him in pulling a wishbone. Despite one employee succeeding, Mr. Burns still prevents them from eating, prompting his housekeeper to warn that he will be cursed for not fulfilling a wishbone promise. The next day, employee Homer Simpson falls into a vat of boiling syrup, flooding the factory and killing everybody. The following Friday, Mr. Burns is visited by the workers' hungry ghosts, who chase him and reveal they came for his soul. Mr. Burns pours oil on himself and jumps into the fireplace, burning down his mansion as he descends to Hell. Later, two investigators visit the mansion's ashes, and they proclaim that every Friday after Thanksgiving shall forever be known as Black Friday.

=== "Denim" ===
Homer tries to impress his crush, Marge, a diner waitress. Later, a pair of mysterious jeans fall onto Earth, and Homer tries them on. He visits Marge just as the diner is robbed, and the jeans—controlling Homer's legs—subdue the robber and impress Marge. The garment introduces itself as Denim, a symbiote from another planet that requires a host. In exchange for Homer wearing him, Denim helps him seduce Marge, but Homer soon finds that Denim refuses to come off. As they grow closer, Denim prevents Homer from telling Marge the truth out of fear Homer will dispose of him. They are eventually able to remove the jeans, and Denim attempts to kill Marge. Homer stops him, reluctantly choosing to break up with Marge to spare her life. Denim soon reveals to Homer that his kind is invading the planet as more jeans begin to arrive on Earth.

== Production ==
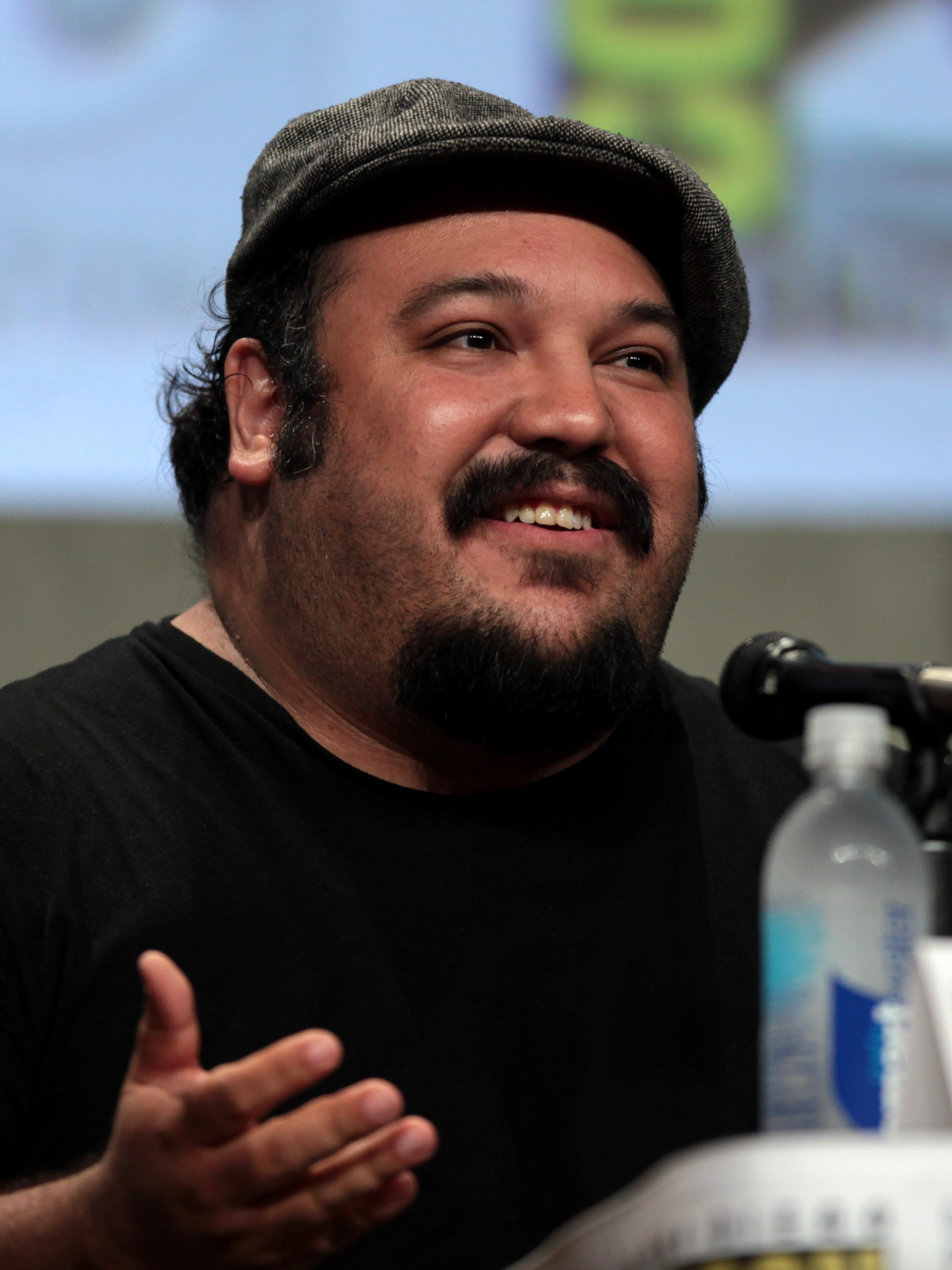
Jorge R. Gutiérrez in 2014

"Treehouse of Horror XXXV" was directed by Timothy Bailey. The series' Treehouse of Horror anthologies have been an annual feature of its run since 1990, all consisting of three non-canon, horror-themed stories and parodies. Prior to the first segment, the episode opens with an introduction short, created by guest animator Jorge R. Gutiérrez. Using a different animation style, the short portrays the series' characters in the style of Gutiérrez's 2014 film The Book of Life. Characters from the movie—La Muerte and Xibalba—also appear in the segment, which is portrayed as a lucha libre video game played by aliens Kang and Kodos. A punk rock version of the song Jarabe Tapatío, composed by Juan Carlos Enriquez, plays over the sequence, with lyrics sung by Gutiérrez, Enriquez, and segment producer Tim Yoon. Gutiérrez had been a fan of The Simpsons since the episode "Kamp Krusty", and was eager to contribute. He was given creative freedom over the segment, only restricted to a one minute runtime. In July 2024 at San Diego Comic-Con, executive producer Matt Selman recorded the screams of a large panel audience for use at an undisclosed point in the episode; these screams were ultimately played over the Gracie Films studio logo during the end credits.

To avoid giving one political side more weight in "The Information Rage", Selman decided to focus on the anger generated by both conservatives and liberals. Rob LaZebnik, who wrote the segment and co-ran the episode, wanted a concept where "both sides [would] be offended". The series usually does not strive to do explicitly political humor, according to LaZebnik, but he was interested in how social media and the news drive anger between political factions, particularly because the episode was set to air close to the 2024 United States presidential election. When LaZebnik approached Selman with the pitch, he suggested adding kaiju monsters, which turned the segment into a parody of the film Pacific Rim. The writers spent little time deciding which characters belonged to which political side, as the flexible ways the characters are written allows them to quickly switch between Democratic and Republican alignments. They specifically chose not to include Homer or Marge on either side—notably for the former, who often works as a "mouthpiece" for the writers to express diverse opinions.

"The Fall of the House of Monty" was originally pitched for the 2019 episode "Thanksgiving of Horror", but was too long to fit into the broadcast. The concept stemmed from a desire to create a segment featuring multiple jump scares. However, the crew soon realized that scaring viewers through 2D animation would be difficult, leading them to satirize the trope rather than attempt genuine jump scares. For inspiration, the animators studied famous fictional jump scares for parody material. Written by Dan Vebber, the segment was inspired by his admiration for 1950s horror movies, particularly those produced by Hammer Studios.

Homer, wearing Denim, the sentient pair of jeans. The idea for the segment came from Matt Selman, and the animation was handled by Stoopid Buddy Stoodios.

The idea for "Denim" originated years prior when Selman pitched a parody of the 2018 film Venom to the writing staff, who saved it for a future episode. Following the 2023 Writers Guild of America strike, the crew revisited the concept to quickly assemble a segment with a reduced writing staff. During the writing process, Selman suggested rendering the pants using stop motion animation, to convey an authentic denim fabric texture. Although LaZebnik was initially worried the stop-motion would clash when layered over the 2D animation, he later realized the combination was a success. Because of the time-sensitive animation process, the script had to be finalized quicker than usual to allow sufficient time for production.

The stop motion animation for "Denim" was handled by Stoopid Buddy Stoodios, utilizing physical puppets for the jeans. Filming spanned multiple months, and studio co-founders Seth Green and John Harvatine were allowed to keep some of the puppets once production wrapped. To create the pants, 20 different models were created from real denim—opting for a darker fabric for a "scarier" aesthetic—which were then animated frame-by-frame on top of digital animatics sent to the studio. Selman described the segment as "really funny [and] silly", with the pair of jeans being voiced by Kevin Michael Richardson. Initially, the staff resisted the concept, because they felt it was too "silly" and relied heavily on absurd puns. However, they soon grew attached to the idea of Homer having a genuine bond with his jeans, and it became a "funny idea". In a scene where Homer and Marge attempt to have sex while Homer wears Denim, Marge was originally scripted to comment that the experience was "the best dry humping of my life". Network censors required a change to fit broadcast standards, prompting producers to replace the phrase "dry humping" with "outer course".

== Release and reception ==
"Treehouse of Horror XXXV" premiered in the United States on the Fox Network at 8:00 p.m. ET on November 3, 2024. Broadcast directly following an NFL doubleheader, the episode was watched by 3.18 million viewers, making it the most-watched show on the network that night. It earned a 0.93 rating among adults between the ages of 18 and 49, marking an increase of over two million viewers from the previous episode, "Shoddy Heat", which earned a 0.26 rating and 0.98 million viewers. Along with "Treehouse of Horror Presents: Simpsons Wicked This Way Comes", the episode led the ratings for the season, continuing the series' trend of high viewership for its annual Halloween specials. Within season 36, it was outperformed only by "Bottle Episode", which attracted a higher audience for airing near the holiday season on December 29, 2024. Following its broadcast, the episode became available for streaming on Disney+. In September 2025, the platform launched a continuous, 24 hour Treehouse of Horror marathon stream featuring all past installments to promote both the episode and the series' ongoing Halloween installments.

MediaPost reviewer Adam Buckman labeled "The Information Rage" as "timely", highlighting it as the most noteworthy of the three segments. Praising its balanced satire and criticism of political extremes, Daniel Kurland of Bloody Disgusting called the segment "lively". He also appreciated how the parody was of a "benign" issue, rather than an overly heavy topic that could alienate viewers. Kurland compared it to Nacho Vigalondo's 2016 film Colossal for its theme of commonality behind heated political arguments. Conversely, ComicBook.com reviewer Nick Valdez considered the segment to be a weak opening. Valdez asserted that it felt out of place for specials typically dedicated to horror rather than social commentary, which he felt belonged in a standard episode.

Kurland deemed "The Fall of the House of Monty" the best segment of the three, highlighting its gore and vintage film-stock animation style. He highlighted its satirical take on Edgar Allan Poe's story "The Fall of the House of Usher", along with secondary parodies of other horror works, including those of Mike Flanagan. In a separate review, Valdez placed the overall episode 12th on his ranking of season 36, describing "The Fall of the House of Monty" as one of the episode's "standout" aspects. ScreenRant's Cathal Gunning hailed the segment as one of the season's highlights, commending its unique parody of Poe's stories. Gunning called it a "triumph" that functioned effectively as a genuine horror story at times, particularly during the scene where Homer falls into the vat. Additionally, /Film writer Rafael Motamayor ranked it as the fifth best Thanksgiving-themed story in the series' history. Motamayor praised the "fun" humor of the segment and its commentary on interpersonal connections.

Writing for Collider, critic Thomas Butt praised "Denim", considering the parody superior to the Venom films themselves, also appreciating how it blended the tone of the series' early seasons with modern humor. Furthermore, Butt highlighted Denim's visual design as a highly effective sight gag, concluding that the segment "crystallizes the silliness of Venom and the level of seriousness we ought to grant it". Kurland offered a more critical assessment, calling the story "shallow" and overly reliant on the title pun. Although he enjoyed the stop motion animation, Kurland felt the segment was merely a "fun" watch rather than a well-executed story. Similarly, Nick Valdez criticized the "lackluster" narrative of "Denim" for failing to fully exploit its parody concept, though he still praised the unique visual style as "special".
