= Treehouse of Horror Presents: Simpsons Wicked This Way Comes =

- The Simpsons episode
- Title cards of the episode
- Episode no.: Season 36; Episode 7
- Directed by: Debbie Bruce Mahan
- Written by: Jessica Conrad
- Production code: 35ABF14
- Original air date: November 24, 2024

Guest appearances
- Andy Serkis as Illustrated Man and Siegfried Blaze

Episode chronology
← Previous "Women in Shorts"	Next → "Convenience Airways"
- The Simpsons season 36

"Treehouse of Horror Presents: Simpsons Wicked This Way Comes" is the seventh episode of the thirty-sixth season of the American animated television series The Simpsons, and the 775th episode overall. It aired in the United States on Fox on November 24, 2024. The episode was written by Jessica Conrad and directed by Debbie Bruce Mahan.

The episode is a tribute to Ray Bradbury, offering retellings of three of his works: the radio drama turned short story "The Screaming Woman", the short story "Marionettes, Inc.", and the novel Fahrenheit 451. Andy Serkis guest starred as The Illustrated Man and Siegfried Blaze, and it was the final episode featuring Pamela Hayden on Fox before she retired. Maggie Simpson does not appear in this episode, except for her image in a photograph in the final story. The episode received positive reviews.

== Plot ==
The Simpson family visits a circus. Lisa goes to see the Illustrated Man who says if she stares at one of his tattoos, she will see an unusual story.

=== Story #1 ===
In an alternate past, in the 1950s, Bart, a rebellious and beautiful little boy, hears a screaming woman buried in the woods. He asks his parents Homer and Marge for help, but they do not believe him. He goes door-to-door to see if a woman is missing.

At the Van Houten house, Luann wants to learn more and invites Bart in. She force-feeds him milk, causing him to become sleepy, but he escapes. In the woods, Bart hears the woman singing a jingle. When Bart repeats it to Homer, he recognizes it as one sung by Kirk Van Houten. They rescue Kirk in the woods.

The police arrest Luann, who buried Kirk for letting Elizabeth Hoover see him buy hair dye for her. However, this is socially acceptable, so she is freed, and the police take Bart's sister Lisa instead, after Bart claims she is a communist.

=== Story #2 ===
In the not-too-distant future, Superintendent Chalmers, annoyed by Principal Skinner, goes to Moe's where Carl shows how he ordered a robot of himself to do boring activities with Lenny.

Chalmers orders a robot to work with Skinner. Enjoying himself, he runs into Skinner, who also ordered a robot. Carl arrives and says he destroyed his robot after it developed emotions and refused to allow Carl to go on a trip it planned with Lenny.

At a school assembly, they see the robots have developed a friendship. They fight the robots. Skinner shoots and destroys his, but cannot tell which is the real Chalmers. When one reasons with him and the other insults him, he shoots and kills the former who was the real Chalmers. The robot Chalmers comforts Skinner.

=== Story #3 ===
In a dystopian future, Homer is part of a team led by Siegfried Blaze that sets fire to videotapes of low-brow television shows. At home, the Simpsons watch high-brow shows such as Robber Barons, but Homer does not like them.

At a raid at the abandoned Springfield Elementary School, Homer stumbles across Groundskeeper Willie's shack and notices his TV is playing a videotape of America's Funniest Home Videos and ends up watching it and laughing at it. Noticing that Homer likes it, Willie gives Homer the videotape of it before he is taken away. At home, he secretly watches the tape in the attic and enjoys it, but Bart catches him. While Homer pleas to Bart to not report him, he ends up reporting him to the team anyway in exchange for Robber Barons merchandise. The Burn-Master General, Siegfried Blaze, confronts Homer, explaining that quality television is used to control the population so they do not notice they live in a dystopian world.

Blaze tries to force Homer into reeducation, but he escapes and finds a group of like-minded people led by Krusty the Clown. Though he is taken underground, Siegfried arrives with his group and starts burning everything. They retreat to the woods outside of Springfield to tell stories about low-brow television.

=== Credits ===
After seeing the stories, Lisa has become a tattoo on the Illustrated Man as the credits roll. He states that she will make some friends out of his other tattoos. A Sun tattoo sings "Santeria" by Sublime as Lisa becomes annoyed.

== Production ==
In July 2024, at San Diego Comic-Con, a second Treehouse of Horror episode for the season was announced in addition to the traditional annual Treehouse of Horror episode. The episode featured three segments parodying stories by author Ray Bradbury. According to series creator Matt Groening, Bradbury criticized the show in the press after the series premiered because it borrowed from an episode of The Twilight Zone that he wrote.

Executive producer Matt Selman bought a book of Bradbury short stories and "The Screaming Woman" inspired him for a story about Bart because no one would believe him that a woman was in danger. The writers then found two more Bradbury stories to use.

The attic scene from the third story originally showed the attic with wooden floors and support beams. However, producer Richard Chung agreed to redo it since the wood did not match the rest of the concrete, brutalist house.

Regarding the air date not being near Halloween, Selman would have preferred "Treehouse of Horror XXXV" and this episode to have aired on consecutive Sundays with Halloween in between or to have them air on the same night. However, Fox did not want to have the episodes air consecutively, and Selman was pleased that each episode was given an NFL lead-in.

"Treehouse of Horror Presents: Simpsons Wicked This Way Comes" was the final episode to air on Fox featuring Pamela Hayden before she retired. Hayden would continue to act in the Disney+ episodes as part of this season.

Andy Serkis guest starred as the Illustrated Man and Siegfried Blaze. Serkis previously guest starred in the fourteenth season episode "Dude, Where's My Ranch?" as a different character.

== Cultural references ==
The title of the episode refers to Ray Bradbury's novel Something Wicked This Way Comes (1962). The Illustrated Man refers to Bradbury's 1951 collection of short stories. The first segment is a parody of the radio play "The Screaming Woman" by Bradbury, which became the basis for a short story and the 1972 made-for-television film The Screaming Woman. The second segment is a parody of Bradbury's short story "Marionettes, Inc.", which was included in The Illustrated Man. The third segment is a parody of Bradbury's novel Fahrenheit 451 (1953).

== Reception ==
=== Viewing figures ===
Leading out of an NFL doubleheader, the episode earned a 0.67 rating and was watched by 2.69 million viewers, which was the most-watched show on Fox that night. It had a total of 2.69 million viewers, which was a substantial increase over previous episodes. According to Cathal Gunning of Screen Rant its audience is higher than that of the season 31 episodes "Livin La Pura Vida" and "Todd, Todd, Why Hast Thou Forsaken Me?"

=== Critical response ===
Daniel Kurland of Bloody Disgusting said the episode "is such a delight and one of The Simpsons' most consistent anthology episodes in a long time." He compared the setup with the Rod Serling's Night Gallery motif used in the fifth season episode "Treehouse of Horror IV". He thought the final segment parodying Fahrenheit 451 was the best one. John Schwarz of Bubbleblabber gave the episode an 8 out of 10. He highlighted the performance by Andy Serkis. He liked the final segment the most, saying that he liked the commentary on people who complain about television programming that is not "high brow enough for the general populace." He also thought the episode was better than "Treehouse of Horror XXXV" from earlier in the season.

Mike Celestino of Laughing Place said the aspect of the episode he was "most impressed with here is the tribute to literature" as opposed to the more common use of pop culture references in the main Treehouse of Horror series. He thought it was "very cool" that the writers were able to make an entire episode dedicated to Bradbury. Nick Valdez of Comicbook.com ranked the episode eighth out of all the season's episodes. He considered it better than the first Treehouse of Horror, as "it's better crafted than the other Treehouse of Horror XXV shorts and utilizes the characters better."
