= The Yellow Lotus =

- The Simpsons episode
- Homer (right) and Marge (middle) speak with Nick Callahan, who is killed off by the episode's end. The decision to kill him came from the crew's desire to have a minor character death without any significant ramifications.
- Episode no.: Season 36; Episode 2
- Directed by: Matthew Faughnan
- Written by: Loni Steele Sosthand
- Production code: 35ABF08
- Original air date: October 6, 2024
- Running time: 23 minutes

Guest appearances
- Chloe Fineman as Tasha; Kelsey Grammer as Sideshow Bob

Episode chronology
← Previous "Bart's Birthday"	Next → "Desperately Seeking Lisa"
- The Simpsons season 36

"The Yellow Lotus" is the second episode of the thirty-sixth season of the American animated television series The Simpsons. The 770th episode overall, it originally aired in the United States on the Fox Network on October 6, 2024. The episode was written by Loni Steele Sosthand and directed by Matthew Faughnan.

The series follows the dysfunctional Simpson family, consisting of patriarch Homer (Dan Castellaneta), matriarch Marge (Julie Kavner), son Bart (Nancy Cartwright), oldest daughter Lisa (Yeardley Smith), and youngest Maggie, as they live out their misadventures in the town of Springfield. In the episode, the family goes to a high-end resort and encounter Sideshow Bob (Kelsey Grammer), and are forced to stay with him and his wife, Tasha (Chloe Fineman), in order to extend their stay. However, a prediction from a fortune teller about someone dying makes Marge suspicious about Sideshow Bob's intentions.

The episode heavily parodies the television series The White Lotus, whose creator Mike White declined a possible guest spot for the episode. In "The Yellow Lotus", the character of Nick Callahan returns, making his first appearance since his one–off role decades prior in "Realty Bites". He is killed off at the end of the episode, and the decision for him to die was done out of a desire to have a character die in the episode without losing anyone significant, so a minor one-off character was chosen. Upon release, the episode received generally mixed reviews from critics, with much criticism going towards the episode's unremarkable use of Sideshow Bob. A book Marge is seen reading in the episode was later featured in an episode of The White Lotus, which has been noted as a possible reference to The Simpsons.

== Plot ==
In a flash-forward, Homer Simpson and his wife Marge enjoy a swim outside of an island resort, The Yellow Lotus, before they encounter a dead body drifting by them. One week earlier, the Simpsons arrive at the resort through a timeshare, which Homer was duped into buying from real estate agent Nick Callahan ten years prior. They find that the timeshare company no longer operates the resort, but they are still allowed a stay of twenty minutes. Their room is given to their family physician, Dr. Hibbert, who requested a room without a minibar for his recovering alcoholic wife Bernice; to sooth herself, Bernice takes a handful of random pills she swiped from her husband. As the Simpsons wait to leave, they meet Tasha, who requested three suites for herself, her husband, and her luggage.

The family hides in her luggage suite to stay longer, where they learn her husband is the murderous Sideshow Bob, who has tried to kill Homer and Marge's son Bart multiple times. Bob proposes a deal where he allows them to stay in the suite if they do not expose his past to Tasha, and the Simpsons agree. Bart and his sisters Lisa and Maggie stay in the children's area, where they act spoiled to blend in with the rich children. Marge and Homer enjoy the resort and hide from security while noticing that they are the only happy couple. They also overhear a fortune teller warn a group of people that someone will die on the trip. Worried for Tasha, Marge warns her about Bob, so he calls security on Marge and Homer, causing them to flee.

Marge admonishes Callahan for selling them the timeshare and the resort guests for not appreciating where they are. Security catches the Simpsons, but Marge and Homer decide to swim in the ocean as they wait for a ferry. Homer and Marge witness Bob and Tasha atop a cliff, where he gives her a necklace, but she pushes him down the cliff onto a path below due to her mental anguish. He gets up with help from his coworker, Sideshow Mel, as they walk off together. Meanwhile, after it takes some of Bernice's pills, a drug-addled sea otter attacks and kills a snorkeling Callahan, whose body drifts toward Homer and Marge. News reporter Kent Brockman later reports on Callahan's death, but he is then attacked by the same sea otter.

== Production ==
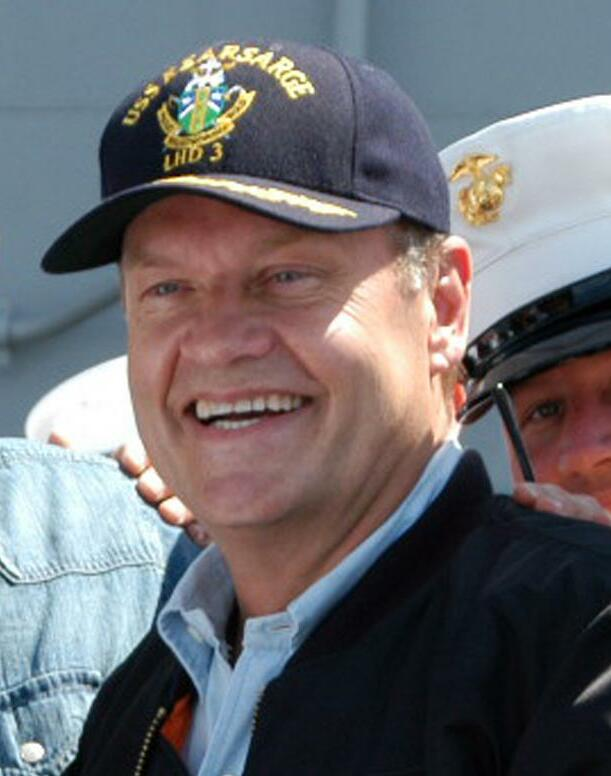
Kelsey Grammer reprises his role as Sideshow Bob in the episode.

"The Yellow Lotus" was directed by Matthew Faughnan and written by Loni Steele Sosthand. It was produced under the production code of 35ABF08. Guest stars for the episode include Kelsey Grammer reprising his role as Sideshow Bob, and Chloe Fineman as his wife Tasha, a new character. Former showrunner Mike Reiss and his wife also make a non-speaking cameo appearance as themselves in the episode's flashback sequence.

The episode and its setting parody the television series The White Lotus. On January 8, 2024, the episode's title and production code were confirmed by executive producer Al Jean, with further details about its premise being provided that August. "The Yellow Lotus" includes a title sequence with music and lyrics sung by the series' principal composer Kara Talve, which parodies the intro from the second season of The White Lotus. The script was sent to Mike White, creator of The White Lotus, for a possible cameo appearance, but he declined. In the episode, the character of Nick Callahan, who first appeared in the ninth season episode "Realty Bites", is killed off. He was chosen because the producers wished to have a character death to further parody The White Lotus, while still using someone "okay to lose". Marge can be seen reading My Name Is Barbra in "The Yellow Lotus", which Jean noted was also included in a later episode of The White Lotus, being read by character Jaclyn Lemon. He considered this to be a possible reference to the episode, also calling it an example of the series famously predicting future events.

== Release and reception ==
"The Yellow Lotus" first aired on the Fox Network at 8:00 p.m. ET on October 6, 2024. In the United States, the episode was watched by a total of 0.89 million viewers during its original broadcast, making it the most watched show on the channel that night. It garnered a share of 0.23% share among adults between the ages of 18 and 49, meaning that it was seen by 0.23% of all households in that demographic. It marked a decrease in viewership from the previous episode, "Bart's Birthday", which had earned a 0.33% rating and drew in 1.03 million viewers.

Nick Valdez of Comicbook.com listed the episode 17th in his ranking of the episodes of the show's thirty-sixth season. He criticized the episode's The White Lotus parody and the Sideshow Bob storyline, which he felt went nowhere, writing, "It's ultimately revealed that he wasn't up to anything at all [...] In the end, he's just there". Similarly, Collider's Shawn Van Horn heavily criticized the episode, calling it an indicator that the series had gotten "bored" with Sideshow Bob, and were giving him plots that Van Horn felt did not work. He condemned the series for not trying to give Sideshow Bob any mayhem or villainous plans like his episodes used to have, and describes the episode's version of him as "just another character".

MovieWeb's Marcos Melendez praised the intro sequence parodying The White Lotus', highlighting it for "playfully" pointing out oddities of the series—like how they eat constantly but still maintain well-defined bodies—and "hitting the nail on the head". Writing about the episode bringing back the gag of Sideshow Bob comically stepping on a rake, ScreenRant writer Brandon Zachary called its inclusion in the episode a "great" reinvention of the gag, in which he creates his own custom rake that is too small to hit his head, but ends up hitting his crotch. Zachary also positively compared the usage to a gag from the 1995 episode "A Star Is Burns", where a man is hit in the groin by a football in his own aptly-titled short film, "Man Getting Hit By Football", saying that "The Yellow Lotus" reminded him of "the approach to comedy that's always made The Simpsons special".
