= Shoddy Heat =

- The Simpsons episode
- Episode no.: Season 36; Episode 4
- Directed by: Gabriel DeFrancesco
- Written by: Jeff Westbrook
- Production code: 35ABF16
- Original air date: October 27, 2024

Guest appearance
- Topher Grace as Billy O'Donnell

Episode chronology
← Previous "Desperately Seeking Lisa"	Next → "Treehouse of Horror XXXV"
- The Simpsons season 36

"Shoddy Heat" is the fourth episode of the thirty-sixth season of the American animated television series The Simpsons, and the 772nd episode overall. It aired in the United States on Fox on October 27, 2024. The episode was written by Jeff Westbrook and directed by Gabriel DeFrancesco.

In this episode, a dead body forces Grampa to reveal his life as a private detective and the mystery of the disappearance of his partner. Topher Grace guest starred as Billy O'Donnell. The episode received mixed-to-negative reviews.

== Plot ==
To escape the heat, the Simpson family visits Grampa Simpson at the retirement home to use his air conditioner. Grampa blocks Homer from feeling the cool air while Homer Simpson accuses him of never doing anything nice for him. The police come and ask Grampa for help. At the cemetery where graves are being moved for new construction, they found a coffin containing two bodies and a business card for Grampa's detective agency. Grampa explains he was a private detective with Billy O'Donnell. Agnes Skinner asked them to investigate her boyfriend Mr. Burns whom she suspected was being unfaithful. Grampa was busy caring for Homer, so Billy investigated and never returned. Grampa never looked for Billy. The police name him a person of interest.

Homer is not surprised that Grampa never looked for Billy while Lisa Simpson wants to investigate. She tests the business card using a forensics kit and finds type AB-negative blood on it. She visits the DMV to find Billy's information which confirms a matching blood type. She visits Grampa while the police watch outside. Records show Billy's car was abandoned where the Nuclear Power Plant is now located. Grampa tells her not to investigate, but she is disappointed by his behavior. Grampa admits he investigated Billy's disappearance. He interviewed Agnes and began a romantic relationship, and she confessed that her and Billy had followed Burns and Agnes stayed in Billy's car while he went alone but never returned. Grampa explains he then visited Burns but refuses to tell Lisa what happened because it would ruin Homer.

Grampa escapes from the police. Agnes shows Grampa dust that was near Billy's car. At Burns' mansion, Grampa reveals that 40 years earlier, Burns said he sent Billy to paradise, but Grampa vowed to keep investigating. Seeing Homer behave foolishly, Burns stopped Grampa by offering to give Homer a job when he grows up and to never fire him. In the present, Homer overhears this and thanks Grampa, who deduces that the dust is from phonebooks used for constructing the power plant. He accuses Burns of killing Billy when he discovered this, but Burns phones Billy, proving he was sent to a tropical paradise to silence him. Billy told Agnes to tell Grampa, but Agnes wanted Grampa to kill Burns to inherit his fortune.

Later, Lisa asks the police who was in the coffin and they said it was the business card printer who wanted to be buried with his wife as Chief Wiggum has salvaged some business cards from the grave.

== Production ==
Promoting the episode, executive producer Al Jean said the episode would solve a mystery that had puzzled him since the start of the series. Jean also held a contest to give signed scripts to fans who guessed the answer correctly.

Topher Grace guest starred as Billy O'Donnell. Grace previously guest starred in the nineteenth season episode "The Debarted" as a different character.

== Cultural references ==
The title of the episode refers to the 1981 film Body Heat.

== Reception ==
=== Viewing figures ===
The episode earned a 0.26 rating and was watched by 0.98 million viewers, which was the most-watched show on Fox that night.

=== Critical response ===
John Schwarz of Bubbleblabber gave the episode a 7.5 out of 10. He liked the flashback setting but felt the plot involving a love triangle between Grampa and Mr. Burns seemed similar to the fifth season episode "Lady Bouvier's Lover". He also thought Topher Grace sounded too young to be voicing Billy. Mike Celestino of Laughing Place did not like the mystery or humor in the episode. Regarding the 1980s setting of the flashback, he said, "I think monkeying with the timeline of The Simpsons really throws me off".

JM McNab of Cracked.com noted that the revelation that Homer could not be fired did not conform with previous episodes in which Homer was fired or when Mr. Burns did not remember Homer's name in the early seasons. Nick Venable of CinemaBlend also thought it was not necessary to explain the gaps in plot or logic regarding Homer's job. Nick Valdez of Comicbook.com ranked the episode 11th on his list of all the episodes of the season. He praised the story for focusing on Abe's past, saying, "It may conflict with some things shown in previous seasons, but it's a great payoff in the end, as it adds new nuances to Abe's past overall. Not only does it reveal that he has a close relationship with Agnes Skinner, but that Abe was far more competent than fans knew. It's a pretty fun episode."
