= Convenience Airways =

- The Simpsons episode
- Episode no.: Season 36; Episode 8
- Directed by: Rob Oliver
- Written by: Loni Steele Sosthand
- Production code: 36ABF01
- Original air date: December 8, 2024

Guest appearances
- Kate Berlant as Stressed Woman; John Early as Joel; Jay Pharoah as Drederick Tatum; John Pirruccello as Warren Wingspan

Episode chronology
| ← Previous "Treehouse of Horror Presents: Simpsons Wicked This Way Comes" | Next → "Homer and Her Sisters" |
- The Simpsons season 36

"Convenience Airways" is the eighth episode of the thirty-sixth season of the American animated television series The Simpsons, and the 776th episode overall. It aired in the United States on Fox on December 8, 2024. The episode was written by Loni Steele Sosthand and directed by Rob Oliver.

In this episode, the Simpson family fly to a family reunion with a group of unruly passengers with a congressional hearing being the framing part of the episode. Kate Berlant, John Early, and John Pirruccello guest starred. It received positive reviews.

== Plot ==
At a Congressional hearing, Marge and Homer recall their experience flying Convenience Airways with their children on a family trip to a Bouvier family reunion.

They must fly with the airline because Homer is banned from all other airlines for his various offenses. Marge makes Homer promise to be on his best behavior. Because the flight is overbooked, the family must sit separately, but Marge is upgraded to first class and falls asleep in her seat. Homer is seated in a middle seat next to Comic Book Guy. Bart is annoyed by the poor comedy of flight attendant Joel. Maggie sits with Lisa, who tries to teach her jazz trivia, much to her irritation. Homer texts Marge for help in dealing with the unruly passengers, but the sleeping Marge does not respond.

At the hearing, the CEO of Convenience Airways Warren Wingspan confirmed that their business model is to handle unruly passengers banned from other airlines.

On the flight, Homer asks a flight attendant for help dealing with Comic Book Guy's annoying behavior, but he suddenly disappears. When Bart's electronic devices run out of power, he argues with Joel. Bart locks himself in the lavatory with the intercom to make fun of Joel but disappears. Lisa puts headphones on Maggie to play her jazz, but she cries. Lisa hands Maggie to Homer. Maggie's crying angers the other passengers. When Maggie needs a diaper change, they go to first class, where Krusty the Clown and Drederick Tatum are fighting. Maggie crawls and retrieves the diaper bag next to Marge and they go to the lavatory to change her diaper. When they emerge, all the passengers have disappeared. Homer demands the flight attendant explain what happened and he falls through a trap door into a prison under the cabin, leaving Maggie behind.

At the hearing, Warren Wingspan says the passengers were warned about the prison during the safety video before takeoff.

In the prison, the passengers attempt to break out while Homer texts Marge a goodbye message in case he dies. Maggie, who went to the sleeping Marge, sends Homer emojis from her phone. Thinking that Marge is telling him to be less selfish, he tells the passengers to be civil and decent. After expressing remorse, the passengers are released and they return to their seats. They complete the flight without further incident.

Once the story is done, Ms. Clark has the airline's prison system approved for use by all airlines while considering Convenience Airways' actions justified, despite Marge's protests as she is trapped down.

== Production ==
The writers watched the 1997 film Con Air to prepare for the episode. The animators included the character Cameron Poe from the film as a prisoner in the episode. As part of writer Loni Steele Sosthand's research for the episode, she consulted a friend, who is a flight attendant, who told her about an in-flight potty training session that inspired a similar scene in the episode. The Bouvier family reunion was also inspired by a gathering of Sosthand's family.

Kate Berlant guest starred as Stressed Woman. John Early guest starred as Joel. The character was named after producer Joel H. Cohen, who wrote a short story that inspired plot line with the flight attendant. John Pirruccello guest starred as Warren Wingspan, the CEO of Convenience Airways.

== Cultural references ==
Among Lisa's jazz flash cards are ones for Cannonball Adderley and Sun Ra. Lisa later plays a song in a style of Sun Ra to Maggie, which makes her cry, after calling his work "abstract".

== Release ==
The episode aired simultaneously in all United States time zones at 8:30 PM ET/5:30 PM PT following a special episode of the television series Universal Basic Guys.

== Reception ==
=== Viewing figures ===
Leading out of an NFL doubleheader and Universal Basic Guys, the episode earned a 0.43 rating and was watched by 1.70 million viewers, which was the second-most watched show on Fox that night.

=== Critical response ===
John Schwarz of Bubbleblabber gave the episode a 9 out of 10 and called it "one of the funnier episodes of the year." He highlighted the layout of the plane and prison under the direction of Rob Oliver and liked the cutaway jokes. Mike Celestino of Laughing Place said it was "an amusing episode overall". He stated that airplane humor can be "pretty 'hack'" but acknowledged that the show had not previously done episodes taking place on airplanes. Marisa Roffman of Give Me My Remote liked that the writers and animators made "the episode feel claustrophobic". She thought it was a "unique take" on a Simpsons travel episode.

Brandon Zachary of Screen Rant highlighted how the episode poked fun at airlines by featuring problematic passengers who annoyed Homer. He also emphasized that Marge overcame her fear of flying, first seen in the season six episode "Fear of Flying". Nick Valdez of Comicbook.com ranked the episode sixth on his list of all episodes of the season. He called the revelation that the plane was an experimental flying prison "a fun reveal that leads to one of the funniest stories of the season."
