= Bottle Episode (The Simpsons) =

- The Simpsons episode
- Mr. Burns (middle right) serves the counterfeit wine (middle) to a group of wealthy elites. The episode explores wine counterfeiting, but the writers' team explicitly set out not to make the episode glorify counterfeiting.
- Episode no.: Season 36; Episode 11
- Directed by: Gabriel DeFrancesco
- Written by: Rob LaZebnik; Johnny LaZebnik
- Production code: 36ABF04
- Original air date: December 29, 2024
- Running time: 23 minutes

Guest appearance
- Robert Parker as himself

Episode chronology
← Previous "The Man Who Flew Too Much"	Next → "The Past and the Furious"
- The Simpsons season 36

"Bottle Episode" is the eleventh episode of the thirty-sixth season of the American animated television series The Simpsons. The 781st episode overall, it originally aired in the United States on the Fox Network on December 29, 2024, to notably high ratings. The episode was written by Rob LaZebnik and his son Johnny LaZebnik, and directed by Gabriel DeFrancesco.

The series follows the dysfunctional Simpson family, consisting of patriarch Homer (Dan Castellaneta), matriarch Marge (Julie Kavner), son Bart (Nancy Cartwright), oldest daughter Lisa (Yeardley Smith), and youngest Maggie, as they live out their misadventures in the town of Springfield. In the episode, Marge, after accidentally using a million-dollar bottle of wine, ends up selling counterfeit wine with Smithers (Harry Shearer) to the rich, and gives the profits to the poor. However, they are quickly arrested, and Homer must help them win their trial.

Rob and Johnny LaZebnik conceived of the episode after reading up on Hardy Rodenstock and his supposed wine owned by Thomas Jefferson. Rob LaZebnik held a long fascination with art and sentimental attachments to objects, and Johnny, a non-expert on wine, was an inspiration for Marge's characterization in the episode. Wine critic Robert Parker appeared in "Bottle Episode" as himself. Upon release, the episode received positive reviews, though some criticism was directed towards the episode's revival of the gag of Homer strangling Bart, a long-running joke that had gone dormant for several years. Rob and Johnny LaZebnik received Writers Guild of America Award nominations for their work on the episode.

== Plot ==
Waylon Smithers is instructed by his boss, the billionaire owner of the Springfield nuclear power plant, Mr. Burns, to get him a million-dollar bottle of 19th-century wine owned by Napoleon to Burns' mansion for his wine club. Smithers tasks one of the nuclear plant's employees, Homer Simpson, to get it. Homer places it in a safe in his house, but later finds out his wife Marge accidentally used it in a stew she made, unaware of its value.

Smithers finds out and is furious, but Homer, through a musical number, explains to Marge and Smithers that they should cover it up, as Homer always does when he messes up. Homer's daughter Lisa suggests that they go to the scientist Professor Frink, who analyzes the stew and successfully reproduces the wine. Unaware of the incident, Mr. Burns serves the replica to his wine club, and they are impressed with the drink. While Marge and Smithers celebrate by drinking some of the remaining wine given by Frink, Smithers tells Marge not to feel guilty for lying, as rich people like Mr. Burns often spend excess amounts of money on wine. Marge drunkenly suggests that they should reproduce another bottle of the wine and sell it to the rich, using the proceeds to help the poor. After fantasizing about themselves as Robin Hood and Maid Marian, stealing money from a rich man for people who need it, they decide to do it. The fake wine is sold at auction, but they are soon arrested for wine forgery.

At their trial, Marge accidentally demonstrates how they counterfeited the wine, worsening the situation. After motivation from Lisa and his son Bart, Homer tries to find a way to get Marge out of jail, and goes to Mr. Burns for help. At closing arguments, Marge argues that the fake wine is a replica of the original with no differences, thus no harm has been done. After hearing from both sides, the judge ultimately dismisses the case and declares the fake wine to be real. After the judge leaves, Mr. Burns explains that he bribed the judge so that fake collectibles owned by the rich retain their value. Smithers is disappointed to have been saved by a rich person, but Marge asserts that they can use the proceeds from the auction on charitable endeavors.

== Production ==
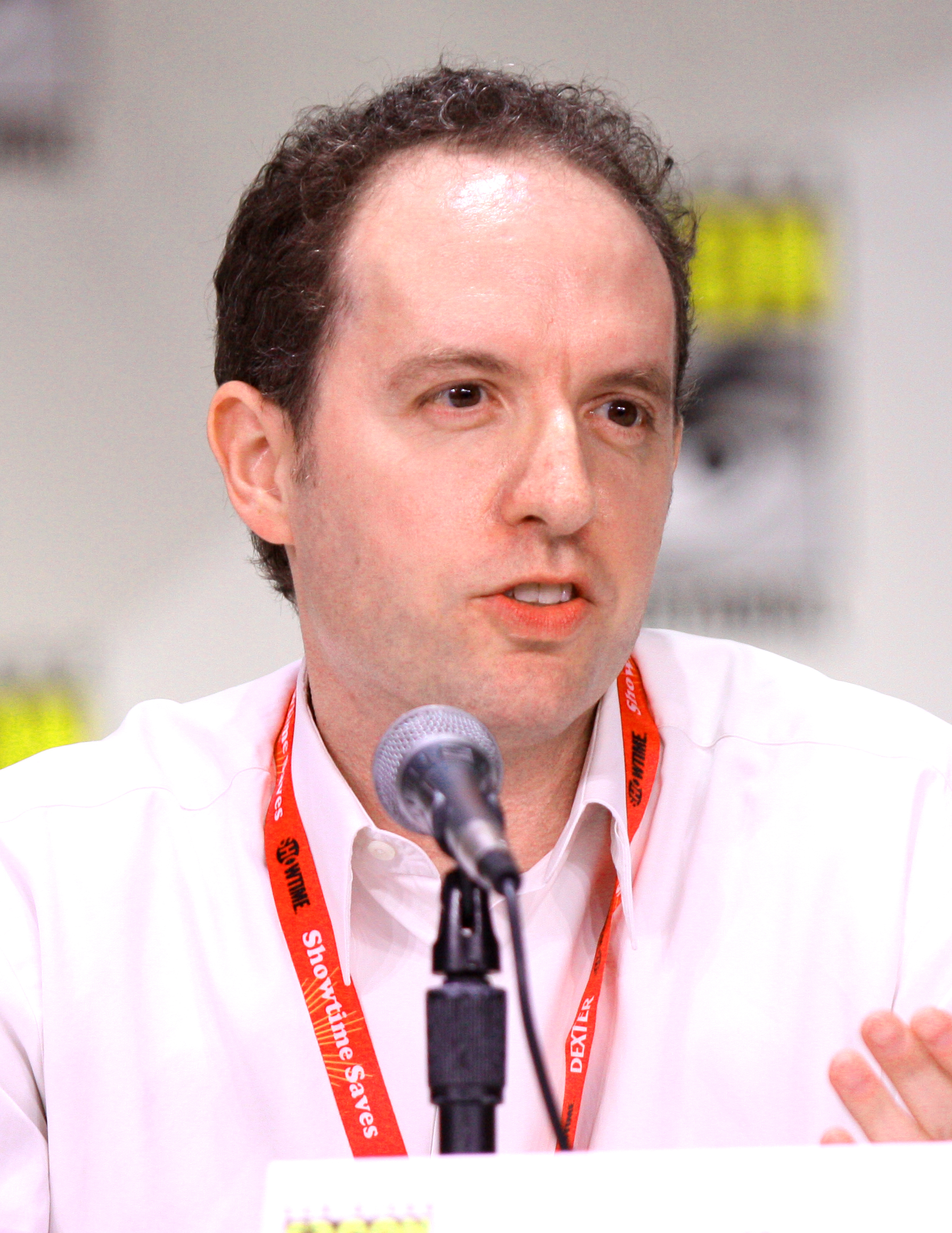
The episode was written by Rob LaZebnik (pictured) and his son, Johnny.

"Bottle Episode" was directed by Gabriel DeFrancesco and written by Rob LaZebnik and his son Johnny LaZebnik. Wine critic Robert Parker guest stars in the episode as himself. According to Rob LaZebnik, the design and writing of the courtroom scene in the episode was based on the courtroom from the 2023 French film Anatomy of a Fall.

The series had multiple writers who enjoyed wine, and the episode was inspired by reports on Hardy Rodenstock and his ownership of wine bottles reportedly owned by Thomas Jefferson. Rob LaZebnik had long been fascinated by objects and the emotional value people attach to them, having written a similarly themed episode of The Simpsons years prior: "The War of Art". The episode was the second to be penned by Johnny LaZeknik, and he, someone who was not as big of an expert on wine as his father, inspired Marge's "newbie" attitude towards the drink in the episode. One thing that was emphasized when writing the episode was that the message should not correlate to how faking wine can be easy, instead going for the moral of how wine is a "real art" that could be perfected. A joke is made in the episode around Homer strangling Bart, with the latter noting his strangulation is "what I bring to the table". Homer strangling Bart was a gag that had been part of the series for many years, and in the 2023 episode "McMansion & Wife", Homer noted that he does not do it anymore as "times have changed", sparking rumors that the series had retired the gag. The scene in "Bottle Episode" was the first time it had been mentioned since "McMansion & Wife", and one of the first times the strangulation had been seen in over four years.

== Release and reception ==
"Bottle Episode" first aired on the Fox Network at 8:00 p.m. ET on December 29, 2024. In the United States, the episode was watched by a total of 3.31 million viewers during its original broadcast, making it the most-watched show on the channel that night. It garnered a 0.92% share among adults between the ages of 18 and 49, meaning that it was seen by 0.92% of all households in that demographic. It marked an increase in viewership of over two million from the previous episode, "The Man Who Flew Too Much", which had earned a 0.26% rating and drew in 0.91 million viewers. The notably large increase continued a trend of episodes airing near the holiday season in late December garnering high ratings, as also seen with the 2022 episode "Top Goon".

Jess Lander, wine reporter for the San Francisco Chronicle, called the episode "light-hearted and funny" as someone who is not an "avid fan" of the series. She thought writers Rob and Johnny LaZebnik "came off as knowledgeable" on the topic of wine, without taking it seriously enough to remove any humor from the episode. Lander commended the jokes geared toward wine enthusiasts, such as the wine club being named "Oen Percenters", and having Robert Parker give a rating to his own conversation with Andrew Lloyd Webber. However, Lander also criticized the episode for not doing much to encourage young people of legal drinking age to take up the hobby, despite it seemingly carrying a pro-wine enthusiast message. Nick Valdez of Comicbook.com placed the episode thirteenth on his ranking of the thirty-sixth season, particularly praising the pairing of Marge and Smithers as a "really fun way" to utilize two characters that usually do not interact much, as well as noting that it "opens the door" for more storylines revolving around the two. Similarly, ScreenRant writer Brandon Zachary enjoyed the Marge and Smithers pairing, finding it to be an example of how the series thrives on bringing together two unrelated characters, who share a common character trait of being unappreciated by their peers, which he felt was part of the reason it worked. Zachary called the episode "sweet" for how Marge is characterized, helping Smithers with his plan to help the poor, while noting it built upon the already-established friendship between the two characters, who have had small scenes in the past detailing that they are well-acquainted with each other.

Regarding the strangulation joke, Cathal Gunning, another ScreenRant writer, criticized it for bringing back a gag he felt had already grown tired, and making it "worse". Gunning noted that the joke had a meta tone to it, possibly being used by the writers as a way to showcase how the gag was "controversial" at this point, but also felt "mean-spirited", as the season had seldom used Bart by this episode, and still went out of its way to call Bart's strangulation one of his defining traits. Ryan Cortero of Collider shared a similar sentiment about the scene, believing it to be "bothersome" that Bart is seemingly okay with being abused in this way, as well as undermining the many ways Homer is portrayed as being a well-meaning father.

For their script for "Bottle Episode", Rob and Johnny LaZebnik were nominated for the Award for Television Animation at the 77th Writers Guild of America Awards, but lost to the Bob's Burgers episode "Saving Favorite Drive-In".
