= Night Gallery =

American anthology TV series (1970–1973)

- DVD cover
- Also known as: Rod Serling's Night Gallery
- Genre: Horror; Fantasy; Drama; Comedy; Thriller; Crime; Mystery; Science fiction
- Created by: Rod Serling
- Presented by: Rod Serling
- Theme music composer: Billy Goldenberg (pilot); Gil Mellé (seasons 1 & 2); Eddie Sauter (season 3)
- Composers: Robert Bain; Paul Glass; John Lewis; Gil Mellé; Oliver Nelson; Robert Prince; Eddie Sauter
- Country of origin: United States
- Original language: English
- No. of seasons: 3
- No. of episodes: 43 (93 segments) (+ pilot) (list of episodes)

Production
- Producers: Jack Laird; William Sackheim
- Camera setup: Single-camera
- Running time: 50 minutes (seasons 1 & 2); 25 minutes (season 3)
- Production company: Universal Television

Original release
- Network: NBC
- Release: November 8, 1969
- Release: December 16, 1970 – May 27, 1973

Night Gallery is an American anthology television series that aired on NBC from December 16, 1970, to May 27, 1973, featuring stories of horror and the macabre. Rod Serling, who had gained fame from an earlier series, The Twilight Zone, served both as the on-air host of Night Gallery and as a major contributor of scripts, although he did not have the same control of content and tone as he had on The Twilight Zone. Serling viewed Night Gallery as a logical extension of The Twilight Zone, but while both series shared an interest in thought-provoking dark fantasy, more of Zone's offerings were science fiction while Night Gallery focused on horrors of the supernatural.

== Background ==
=== Format and style ===
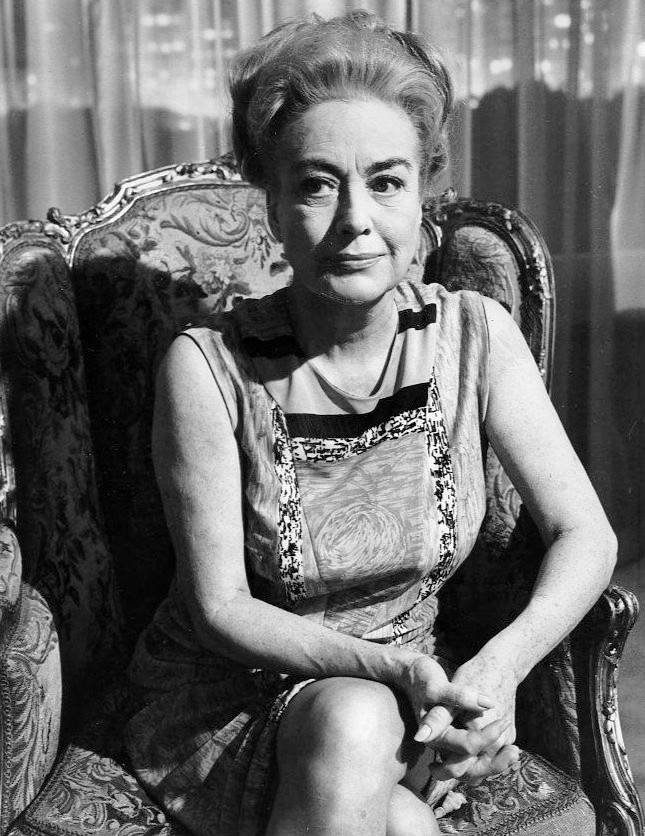
Joan Crawford in the telefilm that began the series, 1969.

Serling appeared in an art gallery setting as the curator and introduced the macabre tales that made up each episode by unveiling paintings (by artists Thomas J. Wright and Jaroslav "Jerry" Gebr) that depicted the stories. His intro usually was, "Good evening, and welcome to a private showing of three paintings, displayed here for the first time. Each is a collector's item in its own way—not because of any special artistic quality, but because each captures on a canvas, suspended in time and space, a frozen moment of a nightmare." Night Gallery regularly presented adaptations of classic fantasy tales by authors such as H. P. Lovecraft, as well as original works, many of which were by Serling himself. Night Gallery's multi-segment presentation mirrored the EC horror comics of the 1950s, and hadn't been seen on television before, except for on the one-off "Trio for Terror" episode of Thriller in 1961.

The series was introduced with a pilot television film consisting of three segments or movies, that aired on November 8, 1969. All three were written by Serling, with the second segment of the film, "Eyes", being the directorial debut of Steven Spielberg, as well as one of the last acting performances by Joan Crawford. Spielberg went on to direct a segment in the first season in 1970, titled "Make Me Laugh", which was another Serling teleplay. This segment was shot as one long take, and Spielberg said it "appalled" network executives due to its unorthodox style.

According to Rod Serling's wife Carol, NBC envisioned Night Gallery as being a show about "action, ghouls and gore". While Serling was fine with having horror elements, he wanted it to be infused with social commentary. Some of Serling's scripts were rejected by producer Jack Laird. He was a fan of the classic Universal Monsters horror films, and preferred NBC's vision of the show.

Night Gallery was initially part of a wheel series called Four in One. This 1970–1971 television series rotated three other shows with Night Gallery, including McCloud, San Francisco International Airport and The Psychiatrist. When Four in One was cancelled, McCloud joined another wheel series, The NBC Mystery Movie, and Night Gallery was spun off as a standalone series.

In its second season, Night Gallery included original comic blackout sketches between the longer story segments in some episodes, conceived by Jack Laird. Most of the blackout sketches were written by Laird himself, and they often featured supernatural characters (such as vampires) in black comedy situations. The inclusion of the short blackout sketches meant that some episodes in the second season had up to four different segments. One of the blackout sketches in the second season, titled "A Matter of Semantics", included Count Dracula (played by Cesar Romero) trying to withdraw blood from a blood bank. The actress who played the blood bank's nurse, E.J. Peaker, later said in 1998 that she remembered the director of "A Matter of Semantics" to be Steven Spielberg. However, Spielberg said in 2023 that he was fired from the show after directing "Make Me Laugh". Jack Laird is officially credited as director of "A Matter of Semantics".

Rod Serling opposed the presence of the blackout sketches on the show due to their tone, and several of them have no introduction from Serling. He said, "I thought they [the blackout sketches] distorted the thread of what we were trying to do on Night Gallery. I don't think one can show Edgar Allan Poe and then come back with Flip Wilson for 34 seconds. I just don't think they fit." In another interview, he referred to them as "foreign and substantially incorrect", complaining that "you can't sustain the mood of horror or suspense and then intersperse light laughter in the middle of it and then expect to be able to go back in a neutral fashion to an element of horror. You spend fifteen minutes creating a mood for an audience and then you dispel it arbitrarily by trying to make them laugh." These types of segments were much less frequent in the third and final season, which had a restrictive budget and a shorter half-hour format. Each episode consisted of a single segment or a short segment and one short blackout sketch. During this season, NBC explicitly forbade the philosophical stories for which The Twilight Zone was known, and demanded fewer adaptations of classic horror fiction, in favor of more contemporary American stories. NBC moved the show from Wednesday to Sunday in the same 10 p.m. timeslot. Regarding these changes, Serling said at the time, "I'm fucking furious. These people are taking what could have been a good series and they're so commercializing it it's not going to be commercial." Serling added that they wanted "considerable action as opposed to anything insightful, cerebral or sensitive." It has been claimed that NBC pushed for Night Gallery to become strictly an action show for the third season, with no supernatural elements, although this would not end up being the case.

=== Writing ===
Serling wrote many of the teleplays, including "Camera Obscura" (based on a short story by Basil Copper), "The Caterpillar" (based on a short story by Oscar Cook), "Class of '99", "Cool Air" (based on a short story by H.P. Lovecraft), "The Doll", "Green Fingers", "Lindemann's Catch", and "The Messiah on Mott Street" (heavily influenced by Bernard Malamud's "Angel Levine"). Non-Serling efforts include "The Dead Man", "I'll Never Leave You—Ever", "Pickman's Model" (based on a short story by H.P. Lovecraft), "A Question of Fear" (based on a short story by Bryan Lewis), "Silent Snow, Secret Snow", and "The Sins of the Fathers".

Robert Bloch wrote two teleplays for the show. "Logoda's Heads" was based on the story by August Derleth. "Last Rites for a Dead Druid" originally was an adaptation by Bloch of the H.P. Lovecraft/Hazel Heald collaboration "Out of the Aeons"; however, Bloch's script was not used, and the episode was rewritten and retitled. As a result, "Last Rites for a Dead Druid" bears no resemblance to "Out of the Aeons".

=== Music ===
The show featured various composers. The original pilot theme and background music was composed by Billy Goldenberg. The theme for the first two seasons, composed by Gil Mellé, is noted for being one of the first television openings to use electronic instruments. For the third season, Mellé's theme was replaced with a more frantic orchestral piece by Eddie Sauter. Currently, no music from the show has been released commercially.

== Legacy ==
While Serling was displeased with the creative interference on Night Gallery, he still mentioned "They're Tearing Down Tim Riley's Bar" as one of the best pieces of work he'd written, putting it above even his Twilight Zone material. Serling's Night Gallery introductions were parodied on The Simpsons' fourth annual Treehouse of Horror special in 1993. It had a wraparound structure featuring Bart Simpson in the Serling role, introducing several paintings. Night Gallery was also parodied on a 1995 episode of Tiny Toons, titled "Night Ghoulery". The series was produced by former Night Gallery director Steven Spielberg, who also directed a segment for the Twilight Zone movie in 1983, and who created his own similar anthology series titled Amazing Stories (1985).

Mexican director Guillermo del Toro has cited the show as a major influence. In 2023, Entertainment Weekly included it on their list of the 21 best horror anthology shows of all time.

=== Award nominations ===
Night Gallery was nominated for an Emmy Award for its first-season episode "They're Tearing Down Tim Riley's Bar" as the Outstanding Single Program on American television in 1971. In 1972, the series received another nomination (Outstanding Achievement in Makeup) for the second-season episode "Pickman's Model". Serling himself received an Edgar Allan Poe Award for writing the pilot.

== Syndication ==
Shortly after Night Gallery was cancelled, the 60-minute episodes from the first two seasons were re-edited for a 30-minute time slot. This was done by producer Universal in order to increase the number of episodes that were available for syndication. Many segments were severely cut, and others extended by inserting "new" scenes of recycled, previously discarded, or stock footage to fill up the time. For example, the segment "The Different Ones" was extended from 15 minutes to 24 minutes, which made it long enough to air as its own stand-alone episode. This was achieved by using footage from two Universal library films (Fahrenheit 451 and Silent Running) in addition to using stock footage from the Apollo space missions. One of the most heavily cut segments was "They're Tearing Down Tim Riley's Bar", which was edited down from 41 minutes to 24 minutes. For time reasons, some of the segments were paired with segments that they didn't originally air alongside. The three segments from the 1969 TV movie pilot were not included as part of the syndication package, because they had already entered syndication as a stand-alone movie.

The syndication edits for Night Gallery were overseen by Universal's Harry Tatelman, who had experience in re-editing old films. In their book Rod Serling's Night Gallery: An After-Hours Tour, authors Scott Skelton and Jim Benson identify 39 of the 98 individual segments that were produced for Night Gallery as being "severely altered" in syndication. Segments such as "Green Fingers" and "Lindemann's Catch" had new music inserted, which leaned towards more of a typical horror sound. The music was changed in an attempt to heighten the tension, and it was also a by-product of having to either cut down segments or pad them out. Richard Bracken, one of Harry Tatelman's editors on Night Gallery, later said "Harry was given the assignment by the studio and it was a job he knew that he could do one way or the other, and he did. I don't know if there was any particular glee in changing the style and content of the show, as much as getting the job done."

25 episodes of an unrelated, short-lived supernatural series from 1972, The Sixth Sense, were also incorporated into the syndicated version of the series. The show was also produced by Universal and shared many of the same actors as Night Gallery. Serling was paid $100,000 dollars to film introductions for the episodes from The Sixth Sense, with new paintings also being commissioned for them. Serling's introductions for The Sixth Sense were written by an unknown member of Harry Tatelman's staff. As The Sixth Sense was originally a one-hour show, these episodes were all severely edited to fit into the half-hour timeslot. In order to have more commercials, some television stations required a few extra minutes be cut from episodes, in addition to the edits that had already been made by Tatelman. These edits were done by people working at their respective stations, and are described as having less care put into them when compared to Tatelman's edits. In later years, stations would simply speed up the episodes instead of creating their own edits, which would lead to a higher pitch in the voice of the actors.

Rod Serling and Jack Laird were both said to be "livid" with the syndication edits. Some directors were allowed input before their segments were edited for syndication, including Jeannot Szwarc. When asked what he thought about the show's syndicated version, Szwarc said in 1998, "what they've done to it is absolutely criminal. But they don't give a shit. That has always been the disease of Hollywood. They don't care about the past, all they care about is making a lot of money now." Szwarc additionally said that he had stopped watching the show, since the syndicated version was still being heavily used on television at that point.

The original, uncut and un-edited hour-long version of the series (and without the additional Sixth Sense episodes) has been shown on STARZ!'s Encore Mystery premium movie cable network. The show has aired in the 30-minute syndicated format in several markets through the Retro Television Network in the past.

MeTV had broadcast rights for Night Gallery and aired the show in its syndicated, 30-minute format, including the edited The Sixth Sense episodes.

From May 21 to May 23, 2016, Decades aired a marathon of the series.

On December 6, 2018, Syfy announced that it had plans to revive the Night Gallery series.

On April 6, 2020, Comet began airing the syndicated version of the show.

== Home media ==
Universal Studios has released all 3 seasons on DVD in Region 1 as well as the first season on DVD in the UK.

On September 12, 2017, Universal released Night Gallery: The Complete Series on DVD in Region 1, and between 2021 and 2022, all three seasons were released onto Blu-ray. The series is not currently available to stream on NBCUniversal's streaming service Peacock, unlike Serling's Twilight Zone, which is streaming on Paramount+ due to being tied to CBS/Paramount rather than NBCUniversal.

DVD name	Episodes	Release date	Additional information
The Complete First Season	6 episodes plus TV movie	August 24, 2004	Includes pilot film
Season 2	22	November 11, 2008	Podcast commentaries, featuring Jim Benson and Scott Skelton; Audio commentaries, with Guillermo del Toro; Revisiting the Gallery: A Look Back; Art Gallery: The Paintings in "Rod Serling's Night Gallery"; NBC TV Promos
Season 3	15	April 10, 2012	
The Complete Series	43 plus TV movie	September 12, 2017	
Night Gallery: Season One Blu-ray	6 episodes plus TV movie	November 23, 2021	8 commentary tracks by Scott Skelton, Jim Benson, Gary Gerani, Tim Lucas, Amanda Reyes, Constantine Nasr, Taylor L. White, Kim Newman, Stephen Jones and Craig Beam; New Featurette "The Syndication Conundrum: Night Gallery's Horrific Second Life in Reruns" by Craig Beam; 4 page booklet with details on each episode
Night Gallery: Season Two Blu-ray	22	July 26, 2022	32 commentary tracks by Scott Skelton, Jim Benson, Guillermo del Toro, John Badham, Laurie Prange, Tim Lucas, David J. Schow, Amanda Reyes, Gary Gerani, Craig Beam, Reba Wissner, Kim Newman, Stephen Jones, and Mark Dawidziak; Lost Tales from Season 2 ("Die Now, Pay Later/Room for One Less/Witches' Feast/Little Girl Lost); 3 New Featurettes "Revisiting the Gallery: A Look Back", "The Syndication Conundrum Part 2: a Look at the Show's Troubled Second Life in Reruns" by Craig Beam, and "Art Gallery: The Paintings"
Night Gallery: Season Three Blu-ray	15	November 22, 2022	25 audio commentary tracks featuring Scott Skelton and Jim Benson, Guillermo Del Toro and others.; "The Syndication Conundrum Part III"; Introductions for "The Sixth Sense" episodes

== See also ==
Similar series

- Alcoa Presents One Step Beyond
- Alfred Hitchcock Presents
- Amazing Stories
- Creepshow
- Darkroom
- Fear Itself
- Masters of Horror
- Masters of Science Fiction
- Monsters
- Night Visions
- Science Fiction Theatre
- Tales from the Crypt
- Tales from the Darkside
- Tales of Tomorrow
- The Outer Limits
- The Ray Bradbury Theater
- The Twilight Zone
- Twilight Zone franchise
- Thriller
- 'Way Out
