= The Simpsons season 36 =

Season of television series

The Simpsons
- Season 36
- Promo art for the season's Disney+ release
- Showrunners: Al Jean (4 episodes); Matt Selman
- No. of episodes: 18 (Fox); 4 (Disney+); 22 (total)

Release
- Original network: Fox; Disney+ (select episodes)
- Original release: September 29, 2024 – May 18, 2025

Season chronology
- ← Previous; Season 35 Next → Season 37

The thirty-sixth season of the American animated sitcom The Simpsons aired on Fox between September 29, 2024, and May 18, 2025. The season was the second of two seasons ordered by Fox. It was produced by Gracie Films and 20th Television Animation. The primary showrunner for the season is Matt Selman. In addition to the Fox broadcast season, four additional episodes were commissioned by Disney+ and released exclusively through their platform. On April 2, 2025, it was announced that the series was renewed for four more seasons.

Work from episodes from the season was nominated for two Emmy Awards, two Writers Guild of America Awards, and one Annie Award.

== Voice cast and characters ==
=== Main cast ===
- Dan Castellaneta as Homer Simpson, Groundskeeper Willie, Blue-Haired Lawyer, Hans Moleman, Krusty the Clown, Sideshow Mel, Grampa Simpson, Kodos, Mayor Quimby, Rich Texan, Barney Gumble, Gil Gunderson, Squeaky-Voiced Teen, Mr. Teeny, Santa's Little Helper, Ugolin, Louie, Itchy, additional voices
- Julie Kavner as Marge Simpson, Patty and Selma Bouvier, Jacqueline Bouvier
- Nancy Cartwright as Bart Simpson, Nelson Muntz, Ralph Wiggum, Maggie Simpson, Todd Flanders, Kearney Zzyzwicz, additional voices
- Yeardley Smith as Lisa Simpson
- Hank Azaria as Superintendent Chalmers, Comic Book Guy, Kirk Van Houten, Duffman, Moe Szyslak, Raphael, Professor Frink, Dr. Nick Riviera, Chief Wiggum, Nick Callahan, Luigi Risotto, Old Jewish Man, Chazz Busby, Mr. Costington, Snake, Disco Stu, Captain McCallister, Coach Krupt, Johnny Tightlips, Cletus Spuckler, Ian the Very Tall Man, additional voices
- Harry Shearer as Principal Skinner, Ned Flanders, Waylon Smithers, Mr. Burns, Kent Brockman, Lenny Leonard, Kang, Reverend Lovejoy, Dewey Largo, Rainier Wolfcastle, Jasper Beardley, Officer Eddie, Geoffrey, Cesar, Otto Mann, Legs, Scratchy, additional voices

=== Supporting cast ===
- Pamela Hayden as Milhouse Van Houten, Jimbo Jones, Rod Flanders, additional voices (Note: This is the last season to feature Hayden's voice, which features in episodes 1–7 and the Disney+ specials; she retired from acting after the 35th production season concluded.)
- Tress MacNeille as Agnes Skinner, Lindsay Naegle, Shauna Chalmers, Mama Risotto, Lunchlady Dora, Mrs. Muntz, Brunella Pommelhorst, Miss Springfield, Mrs. Vanderbilt, Dolph Shapiro, additional voices
- Kevin Michael Richardson as Dr. Hibbert, Judge Roy Snyder, additional voices
- Kimberly Brooks as Janey Powell, additional voices
- Mo Collins as Jimbo Jones (Note: In episode "P.S. I Hate You" to present)
- Grey DeLisle as Malibu Stacy, Wendell Borton, Martin Prince, Rod Flanders (Note: In episode "The Flandshees of Innersimpson"), Üter Zörker, additional voices
- Alex Désert as Carl Carlson, Officer Lou, Fausto, additional voices
- Chris Edgerly as Rod Flanders (Note: In episodes "Homer and Her Sisters" and "The Man Who Flew Too Much"), additional voices
- Dawnn Lewis as Bernice Hibbert, Opal, additional voices
- Kelly Macleod as Milhouse Van Houten (Note: In episode "Estranger Things")
- Tony Rodríguez as Julio
- Maggie Roswell as Luann Van Houten, Elizabeth Hoover, Helen Lovejoy, additional voices
- Jenny Yokobori as Kumiko Albertson, additional voices

=== Guest cast ===
Guest stars for the season included former series writer Conan O'Brien, John Cena, Danny DeVito, Tom Hanks, and Andy Serkis.

== Episodes ==
No. overall	No. in season (Note: Episodes without an episode number within the season constitute exclusive episodes commissioned and released by Disney+.)	Title	Directed by	Written by	Original release date	Prod. code	U.S. viewers (millions)
769	1	"Bart's Birthday"	Rob Oliver	Jessica Conrad	September 29, 2024	35ABF15	1.08
Conan O'Brien hosts the "series finale" of The Simpsons, in which the finale itself is generated by an AI machine called HackGPT. In the finale, Bart's 11th birthday approaches and he realizes that Springfield is changing around him: Principal Skinner leaves for Sacramento with Groundskeeper Willie, Mr. Burns dies and his fortune is given to the power plant employees, Comic Book Guy and his wife Kumiko's baby is born, with John Cena assisting with the delivery, Moe's Tavern closes, Nelson's father and the real Seymour Skinner return, Krusty the Clown ends his show, and Chief Wiggum joins the Chicago Police Department, as well as various marriages and deaths. Bart gains sentience within the finale and tries to resist the changes. Guest stars: John Cena as himself, Danny DeVito as Herbert Powell, Tom Hanks as himself, Joel McHale as himself, Conan O'Brien as himself, Mark Proksch as Hack-GPT, Seth Rogen as himself, Amy Sedaris as Maggie Simpson (speaking voice)
770	2	"The Yellow Lotus"	Matthew Faughnan	Loni Steele Sosthand	October 6, 2024	35ABF08	0.89
The Simpsons go to a fancy resort intended for Springfield's elite for a vacation, thanks to Homer buying timeshares back when Marge was pregnant with Bart. But when they discover he was scammed and are thrown out only 20 minutes later, the family squat in a room designated for the luggage of a rich newly-wed named Tasha, whose new husband is Sideshow Bob. Bob allows the Simpsons to stay if they do not expose him. When they do, Bob calls security on them, leading to a sequence of events that kills the man who sold the timeshare to the Simpsons. Guest stars: Chloe Fineman as Tasha, Kelsey Grammer as Sideshow Bob, Jay Pharoah as Drederick Tatum, and Kara Talve singing the "Yellow Lotus Theme"
771	3	"Desperately Seeking Lisa"	Matthew Nastuk	Tim Long	October 20, 2024	35ABF18	2.02
Sick of hearing Lisa complaining about Springfield, Marge sends her off with Patty and Selma to Capital City. There, Lisa meets some of the city's urbane artists who invite her to join them at a party where like-minded individuals gather. Lisa decides that this culture is her future instead of Springfield and is swept away into a surreal journey through Capital City's art and drama scene only to soon discover things are not as they seem. She is left with the blame when the artists steal money from a rich woman, but she escapes with the check. She destroys it and floats home to Springfield on a balloon. Guest stars: Griffin Dunne as Cockroach Actor, Richard E. Grant as Julian and British voice, Tracy Letts as Himself, Molly Shannon as Katya
772	4	"Shoddy Heat"	Gabriel DeFrancesco	Jeff Westbrook	October 27, 2024	35ABF16	0.98
The Springfield Police Department unearths a coffin with two corpses in it that also contains a business card of Grampa Simpson's from the 1980s during his brief stint as a private investigator. While Grampa tries to avoid his past, a curious Lisa pushes him to reopen the cold case that caused in the disappearance of his partner Billy and involved both Agnes Skinner and Mr. Burns. It is revealed that Agnes tried to get Grampa to kill Burns in revenge for killing Billy so she could get his fortune, but Burns offers Homer a job in exchange for his silence. He learns that Burns actually sent Billy to a tropical paradise to silence him after he learns of the poor construction of the power plant. Guest star: Topher Grace as William "Billy" O'Donnell
773	5	"Treehouse of Horror XXXV"	Timothy Bailey	Rob LaZebnik & Dan Vebber & Matt Selman	November 3, 2024	35ABF13	3.18
A series of scary stories are prefaced by "Cottage of Terror", a Mexican-themed opening animated by Jorge R. Gutierrez: "The Information Rage": Bart and Lisa find themselves having to put their differences aside as built up political divisiveness and rage manifests as two giant monsters and it is up to the Simpson siblings to save Springfield.; "The Fall of the House of Monty": On the day after Thanksgiving, Victorian-era Mr. Burns becomes a victim of his own greed and cruelty as the dead workers from his corn syrup factory rise up and seek revenge on their former boss.; "Denim": In a parody of Venom, Homer comes into contact with a pair of sentient extraterrestrial denim pants that quickly bond with him, only to refuse to leave him when he needs it the most.; Guest stars: Juan Carlos Enriquez, Jorge R. Gutierrez and Tim Yoon sing "Jarabe Tapatío" and Rob LaZebnik as Spit-Takers Anonymous Guy
774	6	"Women in Shorts"	Eric Koenig	Christine Nangle	November 10, 2024	35ABF17	0.83
An assortment of stories involving the female residents of Springfield like Luann Van Houten, Malibu Stacy, Mrs. Muntz, Marge, Patty and Selma, Bernice Hibbert, Mama Risotto, Lunchlady Dora, Lisa, Agnes Skinner, Helen Lovejoy, and Rayshelle Peyton. Parodies include Barbie, West Side Story, The Nanny, and The Chronicles of Narnia: The Lion, the Witch and the Wardrobe. Guest stars: Ruth Reichl as herself, Kerry Washington as Rayshelle Payton, Christine Nangle as Mom Goods Manager, Renee Ridgeley as Dr. Wendy Sage
775	7	"Treehouse of Horror Presents: Simpsons Wicked This Way Comes"	Debbie Bruce Mahan	Jessica Conrad	November 24, 2024	35ABF14	2.69
In an ode to the works of Ray Bradbury, the Simpson family attend a carnival where Lisa meets an individual known as The Illustrated Man who uses his tattoos to weave various stories for her.: A 1950s Bart hears what he thinks are the screams of a woman buried alive in the woods only to discover nobody will believe him.; A retro-future version of Superintendent Chalmers is convinced by Carl to use a replacement robot duplicate of himself to avoid spending time with Skinner.; Homer is part of a law enforcement team set in a police-state future Springfield where consuming any media that isn't considered as prestige television is illegal.; Guest star: Andy Serkis as Siegfried Blaze and The Illustrated Man
776	8	"Convenience Airways"	Rob Oliver	Loni Steele Sosthand	December 8, 2024	36ABF01	1.70
The Simpsons mention at a Congressional hearing about the time when they were trapped on a flight with the most unruly passengers in America, some of which they know. They soon find that each of its passengers are slowly disappearing. When Homer demands to know what is happening, the flight attendant drops him though a trap door into the prison below. The prisoners attempt to escape, but Homer gets them to calm down, which allows them to return to their seats. Guest stars: Kate Berlant as Stressed Woman, John Early as Joel, Jay Pharoah as Drederick Tatum, John Pirruccello as Warren Wingspan
777	9	"Homer and Her Sisters"	Matthew Nastuk	Nick Dahan	December 15, 2024	36ABF03	1.47
Animosity between Marge's sisters Patty and Selma and Homer peaks when he ruins Patty and Selma's birthday escape room experience. Meanwhile, Krusty is told by his Aunt Sadie Krustofsky to stop being an elitist celebrity and connect with his crew. When Aunt Sadie's tough love approach gets her Aunt Sadie own personal improvement show, Marge uses it to try and bring Homer and her sisters together as well as some other people. Sadie blames Marge as the problem, which leads Homer, Patty, and Selma, to start a friendship. However, at the reunion show, their relationship breaks down, and Marge berates Sadie for making easy fixes. Sadie is then accidentally killed on the show's set. Guest stars: Ike Barinholtz as Wayne the Grip, Susie Essman as Aunt Sadie Krustofsky, Jay Pharoah as Drederick Tatum
778	–	"O C'mon All Ye Faithful"	Debbie Bruce Mahan	Carolyn Omine	December 17, 2024	35ABF21	N/A
779	–	"O C'mon All Ye Faithful"	Matthew Faughnan	Carolyn Omine	December 17, 2024	35ABF22	N/A
Mentalist Derren Brown comes to Springfield to bring some Christmas cheer back to the town. He unintentionally makes Homer believe he is Santa, and the town participates in the delusion. When Brown reveals that happened and says they were believing in a magical being, Flanders has a crisis of faith. He does not understand why God would take both his wives, so Marge tries to get Brown to fix Flanders. Later, Professor Frink takes Flanders on a trip in a submarine when he sees the beauty in the ocean. When it explodes and Flanders survives, his faith is restored. Guest stars: Derren Brown as himself, Patti LaBelle as herself, Pentatonix as themselves Note: These episodes did not air on Fox. They are the first episodes in the show's run to be exclusively released on Disney+.
780	10	"The Man Who Flew Too Much"	Steven Dean Moore	Al Jean	December 22, 2024	36ABF02	0.91
The Pin Pals get back together and travel to Capital City to attend their first ever state bowling championship only for the helicopter to crash on the way there. While Marge and the kids worry, Homer, Barney, Moe, Carl, Ned Flanders and Pin Pal newcomer Fausto try to survive the harsh natural elements of a frozen mountainside as they attempt the arduous journey back home. Marge, believing that Homer is alive, cooks favorite foods. Near death on the mountain, Homer smells the food, and he leads the Pin Pals down the mountain and back to town. Guest star: Glenn Close as Mona Simpson
781	11	"Bottle Episode"	Gabriel DeFrancesco	Rob LaZebnik & Johnny LaZebnik	December 29, 2024	36ABF04	3.31
Smithers asks Homer to take care of a million dollar bottle of Gevrey-Chambertin wine once owned by Napoleon to be delivered to Mr. Burns. But while Homer initially succeeds, Marge unknowingly uses the wine to spice up some stew. Homer suggests they try to cover it up so with Professor Frink's help Smithers and Marge create a fake replica of the wine. When it fools Burns and his rich friends, Marge and Smithers decide to replicate more expensive wine to profit the poor instead of the rich. However, they are caught and arrested. At the trial, they are declared innocent because Burns bribed the judge so that his fake collectibles retain their value. Guest star: Robert Parker as himself Note: This episode was dedicated in memory of former series writer William "Billy" Wright who died on December 16, 2024.
782	–	"The Past and the Furious"	Mike Frank Polcino	Rob LaZebnik	February 12, 2025	35ABF19	N/A
In an alternate reality where all plant life in Springfield has been abolished, Lisa travels back in time to stop a young Montgomery Burns from becoming a heartless tycoon. She and young Burns, who wants to grow orchids, save a moose species from extinction. However, when the moose destroy Burns' orchids, he vows revenge by being a tycoon. Lisa pleads with young Burns, but old Burns stops her and destroys her way of traveling to the past. Guest star: Joseph Gordon-Levitt as Monty B. Note: This episode did not air on Fox, it was exclusively released on Disney+.
783	12	"The Flandshees of Innersimpson"	Chris Clements	Dan Vebber	March 30, 2025	36ABF05	0.62
After Homer pushes Bart into becoming a DJ, his late night mix parties end up stopping the Flanderses from getting any sleep. When Ned buys some noise-cancelling headphones, Homer borrows them immediately. This pushes Ned over the edge and he swears to Homer that he will never speak to him again. While happy at first, Homer quickly cannot stand Ned's silent treatment and the following shenanigans are enough to have Judge Constance Harm sentence them to special therapy. They take a drug to experience a joint hallucination where they discover how they feel about each other and return to their original relationship. Guest star: Rachel Bloom as Annette, Jane Kaczmarek as Judge Constance Harm, Fiona Shaw as Mrs. McCormick
784	13	"The Last Man Expanding"	Timothy Bailey	J. Stewart Burns	April 6, 2025	36ABF06	0.69
A drug called Othinquic is invented that helps people lose weight. This is taken by every fat inhabitant of Springfield who get hooked on it. Marge asks Homer to take it, but when he cannot afford it, he gets a stolen dose from Fat Tony. When Marge sees people with sagging faces as a side effect, she stops Homer, who is kidnapped by Fat Tony, who plans to use his fat to fix the side effect. Marge rescues Homer, who tells the townsfolk to accept who they are on the inside. Guest stars: Sidse Babett Knudsen as a talking Othinquic Pen, Joe Mantegna as Fat Tony
785	14	"P.S. I Hate You"	Mike Frank Polcino	Cesar Mazariegos	April 13, 2025	36ABF07	0.59
Marge hosts a house party that most of Springfield attends because she is so nice, only for a box of letters of hers to go missing during the event. Marge explains to her curious family that the letters were ones she wrote whenever she was angry at somebody, expressing her raw, true feelings about them at the time as a means of venting, but never intended to actually be sent. When the letter thief begins blackmailing Marge with threats of revealing the letters to the public, Marge fears her good-natured reputation will be ruined and tries to work out who stole them. She learns the blackmailer is Shauna. While chasing after her, the letters are released. Marge apologizes to the people, who accept her as a complex person. Guest stars: Beverly D'Angelo as Lurleen Lumpkin, Jon Lovitz as Artie Ziff, Tim Meadows as himself
786	–	"Yellow Planet"	Timothy Bailey	J. Stewart Burns	April 22, 2025	35ABF20	N/A
The Simpsons and other citizens of Springfield are re-imagined as animals in the style of a nature documentary.: Homer is a beluga whale that has fallen in love with a narwhal portrayed by Marge.; Bart and his classmates are marine iguanas who must work to survive being hatched in a dangerous location while being guided by two adult marine iguanas portrayed by Principal Skinner and Superintendent Chalmers.; Lisa is a woodpecker finch who teaches others to use twigs to draw ants out of trees for food.; Guest star: Hugh Bonneville as the Narrator Note: This is the last episode aired that Pamela Hayden provided voice work for as Milhouse, Jimbo, and Rod Flanders. Note: This episode did not air on Fox, it was exclusively released on Disney+.
787	15	"Abe League of Their Moe"	Rob Oliver	Joel H. Cohen	April 27, 2025	36ABF08	0.73
Longing for his grandson Bart to attend a baseball game with him, Grampa Simpson instead finds a fellow Springfield Isotopes fan in Moe. After the two learn of a Macedonian baseball prodigy named Aeropos Walkov that wants to play in America, they court him with a video tape to play for the Springfield Isotopes. It works, making Walkov and Moe local celebrities and finally getting Bart to watch baseball with Grampa. But Grampa feels that the spirit of baseball has become ruined by ads and sponsorship. Walkov ends up illegally gambling on his own sport. To prevent Walkov from ruining sports gambling, the baseball commissioner blames Moe, and Walkov leaves for another team. Guest stars: Kevin Burkhardt as himself, Jamie Demetriou as Aeropos Walkov, Steve Gelbs as himself, Kevin Millar as himself, Jimmy "Jomboy" O'Brien as himself, Chris Rock as himself, Danny Trejo as himself Additional vocals: Navena Neskoska, Kalina Neskoska, Naum Neskoski and Kara Talve singing a Macedonian cover of "Take Me Out to the Ball Game"
788	16	"Stew Lies"	Debbie Bruce Mahan	Broti Gupta	May 4, 2025	36ABF09	0.63
Lisa imitates Bart for one day, then has to deal with the fallout of Bart doing it to her for months. Homer becomes obsessed with extreme television foodie Thad Parkour only for Thad to lose his food mojo when he arrives in Springfield. Homer helps Thad discover his passion for food again, leading to an encounter with Fat Tony and a secret recipe for stew. When Thad's new show reveals the recipe, Thad and Homer are chased by the mob until they smell the stew being cooked by the town, and Homer convinces them that they are being honored. Guest stars: John DiMaggio as Thad Parkour, Maurice LaMarche as Wilhelm von Wonthelm (Note: Originally, Mads Mikkelsen was reported to have been cast as Wilhelm von Wonthelm. LaMarche provided the voice of the character instead.), Joe Mantegna as Fat Tony Additional vocals: Angelo Moore performing additional Ska vocals
789	17	"Full Heart, Empty Pool"	Chris Clements	Jeff Westbrook	May 11, 2025	36ABF10	0.69
After failing to get his planned swimming pool installed, Homer laments that he is only seen as a doofus that has no legacy. While expressing his grief to Grampa, they accidentally invent a hit new sport called "Noodleball" designed to play in empty swimming pools. But when summer rolls around and people want their pools back, Noodleball's existence is in danger until a representative from an avocado company approaches Homer with an offer to build a dedicated arena to the sport under one condition: Grampa is out. Homer accepts, but when he feels guilty, Homer plays in a tournament with Grampa. When they are immediately injured, the sport becomes unpopular. Guest stars: Blake Griffin as himself, Andrew Luck as himself, Megan Rapinoe as herself, Robert Smigel as Gabriel Razelton, Rick Steves as himself Note: This episode was dedicated in memory of Jill Sobule. Cultural References: This episode contains several references to the film Challengers, including the electronic music that resembles the soundtrack to the film composed by Trent Reznor and Atticus Ross, the usage of the song S&M by Rihanna and the scene of Agnes Skinner, Old Jewish Man and Jasper engaging in a tryst.
790	18	"Estranger Things"	Matthew Nastuk	Tim Long	May 18, 2025	36ABF11	0.54
When Marge gets Itchy & Scratchy-themed baby products for Maggie, it causes Bart and Lisa to shun their favorite cartoon show, deeming it to be for babies now. This causes Marge to worry that the two will drift apart now that their former sole common interest is gone. A possible future is shown where Marge dies before Homer and her fears come true. While Lisa becomes successful, Bart is left caring for Homer and his friends. When Lisa discovers this, she calls for Homer to be protected from Bart's incompetence. However, when they learn that Homer is to be imprisoned, they team up to rescue Homer and bring him home. Guest stars: Zooey Deschanel as Quirk Girl, Max Greenfield as Schultz, Sarah McLachlan as herself Additional vocals: Gary LeRoi Gray singing the Itchy & Scratchy Show Reboot theme

== Production ==
=== Development ===
In January 2023, it was announced that The Simpsons had been renewed for their thirty-fifth and thirty-sixth seasons. Executive producer Matt Selman continued his role as the series' primary showrunner, a title he had since the thirty-third season. Executive producer Al Jean also was the showrunner for several episodes of the season.

In July 2024, at San Diego Comic-Con, Selman recorded the screaming of the Simpsons panel audience members audience, which was later utilized in the season's Treehouse of Horror special. In addition, a followup to the seventh season episode "22 Short Films About Springfield", which focused on the lives of more minor characters from the series, was announced. Despite the fact that usually only one is broadcast each season, a second Treehouse of Horror episode also aired, titled "Simpsons Wicked This Way Comes". The episode featured three Halloween-themed segments, parodying stories by the writer Ray Bradbury. Series creator Matt Groening noted that Bradbury previously criticized the series to the press when it premiered, as he felt it stole concepts he had written for The Twilight Zone. The season contained eleven holdover episodes from the previous season, with seven aired on the Fox Network, and four to be aired as specials for the streaming service Disney+.

=== Casting ===
In November 2024, it was announced that Pamela Hayden, who had been the voice of Milhouse and several other characters since 1989, would be retiring from voice acting, and her final acting credit on the Fox broadcasts would be for "Treehouse of Horror Presents: Simpsons Wicked This Way Comes". Fox said that recasting for her characters would "begin in the near future". Hayden continued to feature in the Disney+ episodes as part of this season. In April 2025, it was announced that comedian Mo Collins would take over the role of bully Jimbo Jones, beginning with "P.S. I Hate You". On May 16, 2025, it was announced that singer Kelly Macleod would be taking over as Milhouse, beginning with the season finale, "Estranger Things".

=== Disney+ specials ===
In August 2024, at D23: The Ultimate Disney Fan Event, it was announced that four episodes would premiere exclusively on Disney+. Selman said that for both the thirty-fifth and thirty-sixth production seasons, 18 episodes were ordered by Fox and 4 episodes were ordered by Disney. One of the episodes was a two-part Christmas special entitled "O C'mon All Ye Faithful", with two other episodes "The Past and the Furious" and "Yellow Planet" premiering on the streaming network. Selman said that the producers have agreed to most of Disney's requests for collaboration such as the real-time Simpsons animated version of the December 9, 2024 presentation of Monday Night Football. He also noted that the cross-promotional efforts required cooperation with Fox since the network controlled the show's social media accounts.

== Reception ==
=== Critical response ===
John Schwarz of Bubbleblabber gave the season an 8 out of 10. He liked the guest star performances and highlighted Joseph Gordon-Levitt as young Mr. Burns, but he was concerned about how the replacement actors will perform following Pamela Hayden's retirement. He thought the writing quality was mixed, but liked the episodes focused on Ned Flanders. He wanted future seasons to focus more on social commentary, character depth, and jokes involving the show's parent company.

=== Awards and nominations ===
The episode "Bart's Birthday" was nominated for the Primetime Emmy Award for Outstanding Animated Program at the 77th Primetime Creative Arts Emmy Awards. Hank Azaria was nominated for the Primetime Emmy Award for Outstanding Character Voice-Over Performance at the same awards show for his role as Moe Szyslak in the episode "Abe League of Their Moe". Writer Joel H. Cohen was nominated for the Writers Guild of America Award for Television: Animation at the 78th Writers Guild of America Awards for his script for the same episode. Writers Rob and Johnny LaZebnik were nominated for the Writers Guild of America Award for Television: Animation at the 77th Writers Guild of America Awards for their script for "Bottle Episode". Writer Jessica Conrad was nominated for the Annie Award for Outstanding Achievement for Writing in an Animated Television/Broadcast Production at the 52nd Annie Awards for her script for "Bart's Birthday".
