= So It's Come to This: A Simpsons Clip Show =

- The Simpsons episode
- Episode no.: Season 4 Episode 18
- Directed by: Carlos Baeza
- Written by: Jon Vitti
- Production code: 9F17
- Original air date: April 1, 1993

Episode features
- Chalkboard gag: "No one is interested in my underpants"
- Couch gag: The family members' heads are on the wrong bodies.
- Commentary: Matt Groening; Al Jean; Mike Reiss; Jon Vitti; Jeffrey Lynch

Episode chronology
← Previous "Last Exit to Springfield"	Next → "The Front" "Another Simpsons Clip Show"
- The Simpsons season 4

"So It's Come to This: A Simpsons Clip Show", or simply "A Simpsons Clip Show", is the eighteenth episode of the fourth season of the American animated television series The Simpsons. It originally aired on Fox in the United States on April 1, 1993. In the episode, Homer plays a series of practical jokes on Bart, and to get even, Bart shakes up a can of Homer's beer with a paint shaker. Homer opens the can, resulting in a huge explosion that lands him in the hospital, where he goes into a coma. At Homer's bedside, the Simpson family reminisce, mainly about moments relevant to Homer's life.

The episode was written by Jon Vitti, and directed by Carlos Baeza. This is The Simpsons' first clip show, and it features clips from the first three seasons of the series. It was created to relieve the long hours put in by all of the show's overworked staff. The episode features cultural references to films such as One Flew Over the Cuckoo's Nest, Raiders of the Lost Ark, and Fantastic Voyage.

The episode received positive reviews from critics. It was called "as good as a clip show ever gets" and acquired a Nielsen rating of 14.9.

== Plot ==
On April Fools' Day, Homer plays multiple pranks on Bart, including blinding Bart with tape over his eyes and spoiling a milk carton by placing it near the radiator. Angered by the numerous tricks he has fallen for, Bart decides to get revenge. He shakes up a Duff beer can using a paint shaker at a hardware store and turns up the thermostat in the house, causing Homer to sweat and go to the fridge for the booby-trapped beer. When Homer opens the beer, its massive explosion puts him in the hospital, paralyzed and placed in a wheelchair. While everyone waits for Homer to get well, the family remembers surviving similar hardships, shown in the form of clips from past episodes.

At the hospital, Homer sees a candy machine and, trying to get chocolate, accidentally tips it on himself. The machine crushes him and puts him in a coma. Mr. Burns then tries to pull the plug on Homer's life support system, to save paying for his health insurance. As Homer lies unconscious in the hospital bed, Bart tearfully confesses that he was the one who put him in the hospital with his shaken beer can prank. Hearing this, Homer comes out of the coma and strangles Bart. Marge and the others are happy, seeing Homer behaving normally again. The episode ends with Homer, still under the assumption that it is April Fools' Day, trying to fool the family by saying he is taking them to Hawaii. However, Bart, Lisa, and Marge tell Homer that the current date is May 16, that Homer was in a coma for 7 weeks, and that he lost 5% of his brain as a result. The family laughs it off, although Homer is not sure why he is laughing.

== Production ==
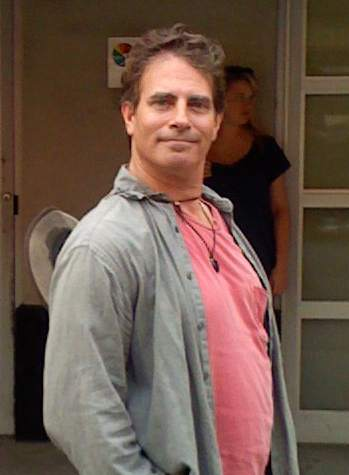
The idea for the 32 "D'oh!s"-in-a-row footage came from a montage in David Silverman's college show.

The episode originally aired on April Fools' Day, 1993 on the Fox network. It was directed by Carlos Baeza, and written by Jon Vitti with contributions from Al Jean, Mike Reiss, Jay Kogen, Wallace Wolodarsky, John Swartzwelder, Jeff Martin, George Meyer, and Nell Scovell. The idea for the 32 "D'oh!s"-in-a-row footage was from David Silverman's montage that he had assembled for his traveling college show.

"So It's Come to This: A Simpsons Clip Show" was The Simpsons' first clip show, created to relieve the long hours put in by all of the show's overworked staff. There was intense pressure on producers of the show to create extra episodes in each season and the plan was to make four clip shows per season to meet that limit. However, writers and producers felt that this many clip shows would alienate fans of the series. The Fox network's reasoning was that clip shows cost half of what a normal episode cost to produce, but they could sell syndication rights at full price. Despite the nature of the clip show, the episode still contained an act and a half of new animation, including the extra scene from "Bart the Daredevil" in which Homer falls down Springfield Gorge a second time after the ambulance crashes into a tree.

The network censors initially refused to let the phrase "beer causes rectal cancer" into the show. The censors eventually relented when they found a medical textbook which stated the link between beer and cancer, but still asked them to "go easy" on beer in the future.

== Referenced clips ==
This flashback episode uses clips from episodes released during the first three seasons: four are from the first, five from the second, and six from the third season.

Episode	Season	Description
"Life on the Fast Lane"	1	Bart throws a baseball and hits Homer in the head. Marge pays Homer a surprise visit at the Springfield Nuclear Power Plant.
"Homer at the Bat"	3	Homer gets hit by a pitch in the head.
"Lisa's Pony"	3	Homer is hit in the head with a circular saw that falls off a shelf. The Kwik-E-Mart automatic doors open and close repeatedly, hitting against a sleeping Homer's head. Homer falls asleep in the car and dreams he is in Slumberland. The instrumental version of "Golden Slumbers" by the Beatles that accompanies the dream sequence in the original episode is here replaced by an original composition of similar style. Presumably this was done for licensing reasons.
"Itchy & Scratchy & Marge"	2	Maggie hits Homer in the head with a mallet. The Itchy & Scratchy cartoon, "Messenger of Death".
"There's No Disgrace Like Home"	1	The Simpsons family having an electroshock therapy at Marvin Monroe's family center.
"Bart the Daredevil"	2	Homer falls off Springfield Gorge.
"Dog of Death"	3	The doctor overseeing Homer is shown to be the veterinarian from the episode. Homer asks Mr. Burns for money.
"The Call of the Simpsons"	1	Homer sets up a trap for a rabbit in the forest.
"Treehouse of Horror"	2	Kang and Kodos abduct the Simpson family.
"Burns Verkaufen der Kraftwerk"	3	Homer dreams of being in the "Land of Chocolate".
"One Fish, Two Fish, Blowfish, Blue Fish"	2	Homer listens to Lisa play the saxophone. Homer teaches Bart how to shave.
"Bart's Friend Falls in Love"	3	Bart steals Homer's jar of pennies.
"Bart the General"	1	Nelson sends Bart home in a trash can by rolling him down a hill.
"Three Men and a Comic Book"	2	Homer "checks" on Bart, Milhouse, and Martin in the treehouse.
Montage sequence	2–3	Homer uttering "D'oh!" in each clip.

== Cultural references ==
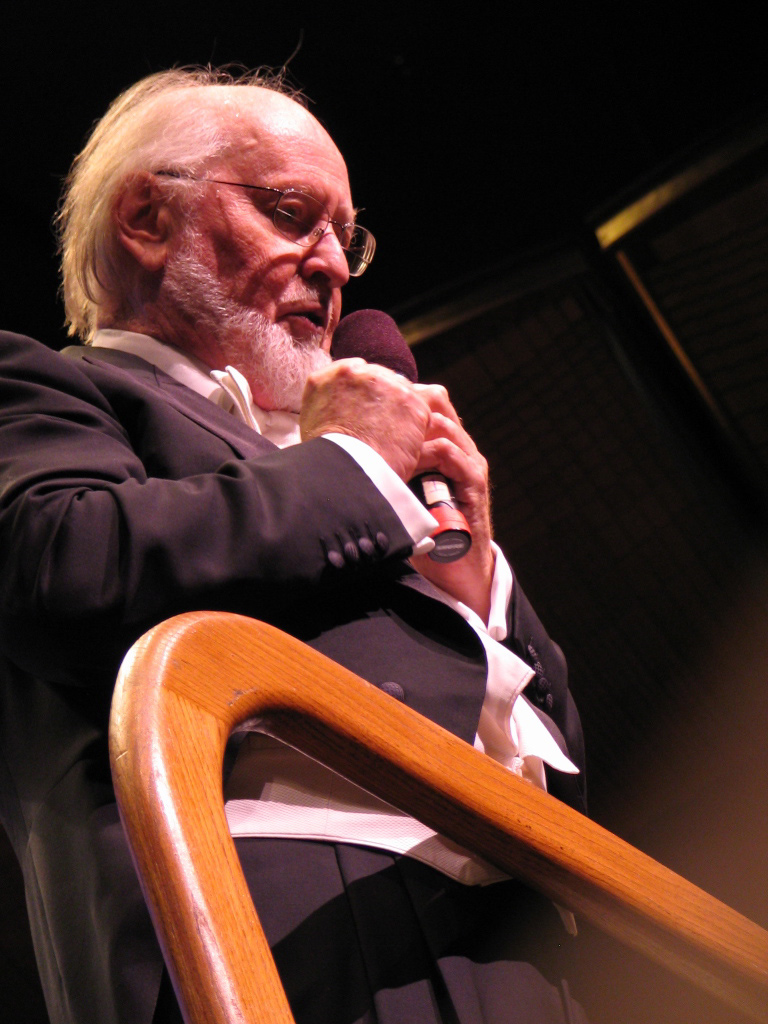
John Williams's theme from Raiders of the Lost Ark plays throughout the scene in which Bart steals Homer's penny jar.

Grandpa's line to Homer, "The world was never meant for one as beautiful as you" is from the song "Vincent" by Don McLean. The scene where Barney attempts to smother Homer with a pillow and breaks a hospital window with a water fountain is a parody of the final scene in Miloš Forman's 1975 film One Flew Over the Cuckoo's Nest. Professor Frink's suggestion of shrinking a crew of men to microscopic size and sending them into Homer in a small submarine is a reference to Richard Fleischer's 1966 film Fantastic Voyage.

There are also many cultural references in the clips from previous episodes. The clip of Homer picking up Marge and carrying her off in his arms into the distance is a reference to the theme of the 1982 film, An Officer and a Gentleman. Bart stealing Homer's penny jar and trying to escape is an almost shot-for-shot parody of the opening sequence in the 1981 film, Raiders of the Lost Ark, while John Williams's "Raiders March" plays throughout. The scene in which Maggie hits Homer over the head with a mallet is an extensive parody of the shower scene from Psycho; the music and camera angles are almost identical.

== Reception ==
In its original American broadcast, "So It's Come to This: A Simpsons Clip Show" finished fourteenth in the ratings for the week of March 28 to April 4, 1993, with a Nielsen rating of 14.9. It was the highest-rated show on the Fox network that week.

The episode has received positive reviews, being labeled "as good as a clip show ever gets", and containing some memorable gags. It has been seen as one "of the most consistently funny episodes of the series", which "strikes that perfect balance between perfectly selected classic moments and all new story segments..." The episode's reference to One Flew Over the Cuckoo's Nest was named the 43rd-greatest film reference in the history of the show by Total Film's Nathan Ditum.

In 2015, executive producer Al Jean reacted to a hypothesis that Homer is still in a coma and all episodes since this one have been imaginary, hence a perceived surrealism and frequent guest appearances. He said that the hypothesis belongs in the "intriguing but false file".
