= Frink =

Frink may refer to:

== Places ==
- Frink, Florida, an unincorporated community
- Frink Park, a park in Seattle, Washington
- Mount Frink, Vancouver Island, British Columbia, Canada

== People ==
- Frink (surname)

== Music ==
- "Frink", a 2024 song from Brooke Candy's Candyland

== Fictional characters ==
- Professor Frink, on The Simpsons
- Frank Frink, in The Man in the High Castle television series, whose family name was originally "Fink"

== Other uses ==
- Frink (programming language), named after Professor Frink (The Simpsons)
- Frink Medal, an award for British zoologists

== See also ==
- Frink ideal, in mathematics, a certain kind of subset of a partially ordered set
- Golden Frinks (1920–2004), African-American civil rights activist
