= Frink (surname) =

Frink is a surname of North German origin.

== People with the surname ==
- Albert Frink, American businessman and politician
- Aline Huke Frink (1904–2000), American mathematician and academic
- Bettye Frink (1933–2025), American politician
- Bill Frink (1926–2005), American sportscaster
- Charles N. Frink (fl. 1860–1896), Wisconsin insurance executive and Populist legislator
- Daniel A. Frink (1835–1885), American politician
- Elisabeth Frink (1930–1993), English sculptor and printmaker
- Fred Frink (1911–1995), American baseball player
- Jerome Frink (born 1993), American basketball player
- John Frink (born 1964), American writer and TV producer
- John M. Frink (1855–1914), Washington State politician and businessperson
- Laurie Frink (1951–2013), American jazz musician
- Lillian Frink (1882–1974), American politician
- Miriam Frink (1892–1977), American educator
- Nathan Frink (1758–1817), United Empire Loyalist
- Orrin Frink (1901–1988), American mathematician who introduced Frink ideals
- Pat Frink (1945–2012), American basketball player
- Stephen Frink (born 1978), American underwater photographer

== See also ==
- Frink (disambiguation)
