= List of The Simpsons cast members =

Cast list for an animated series

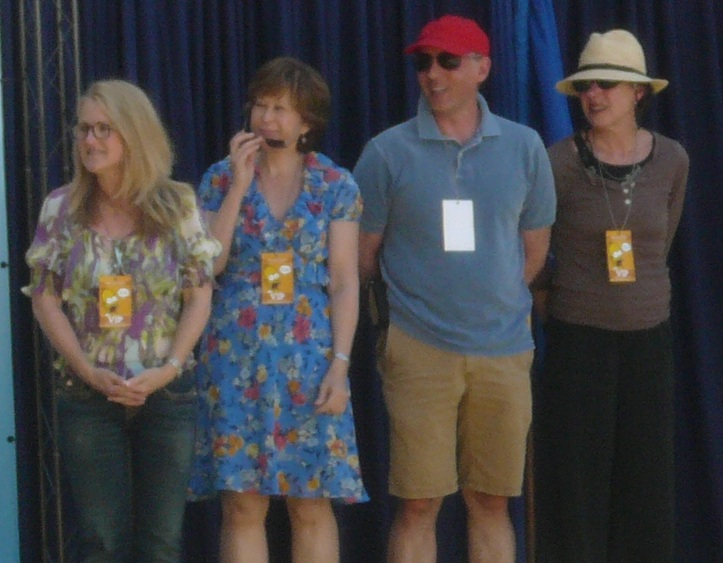
Four of the six main cast members attend a ceremony in 2009, left to right; Nancy Cartwright (Bart), Yeardley Smith (Lisa), Dan Castellaneta (Homer) and Julie Kavner (Marge).

The Simpsons is an American animated sitcom that includes six main voice actors and numerous regular cast and recurring guest stars. The principal cast consists of Dan Castellaneta, Julie Kavner, Nancy Cartwright, Yeardley Smith, Hank Azaria and Harry Shearer. Tress MacNeille, Maggie Roswell, Chris Edgerly, Eric Lopez, Alex Désert, Kevin Michael Richardson, Jenny Yokobori, Kimberly D. Brooks, Dawnn Lewis, Tony Rodriguez, Melanie Minichino, Jonathan Lipow, Mo Collins, Kelly Macleod and Grey DeLisle have appeared as supporting cast members, along with former supporting cast members Pamela Hayden, Russi Taylor, Karl Wiedergott, Marcia Mitzman Gaven, Doris Grau, Susan Blu, Jo Ann Harris, and Christopher Collins. Repeat guest cast members include Marcia Wallace, Phil Hartman, Jon Lovitz, Joe Mantegna, Frank Welker, Keegan-Michael Key, Nick Offerman, Megan Mullally, Pharrell Williams, Kelsey Grammer, Kiefer Sutherland, John C. Reilly, Sarah Silverman, Tom Hanks and Albert Brooks. With the exception of "Old Money", episode credits list only the voice actors, and not the characters they voice.

Both Fox and the production crew wanted to keep their identities secret during the early seasons and closed most of the recording sessions while refusing to publish photos of the recording artists. The network eventually revealed which roles each actor performed in the episode "Old Money", because the producers said the voice actors should receive credit for their work. Every main cast member has won an Emmy for Outstanding Voice-Over Performance. Shearer was the last cast member to win, receiving his award in 2014 for the episode "Four Regrettings and a Funeral." Castellaneta and Azaria have won four, while Kavner, Cartwright, Smith, Shearer, Wallace, Grammer, and guest star Jackie Mason have each won one.

== Regular cast ==
=== Background ===
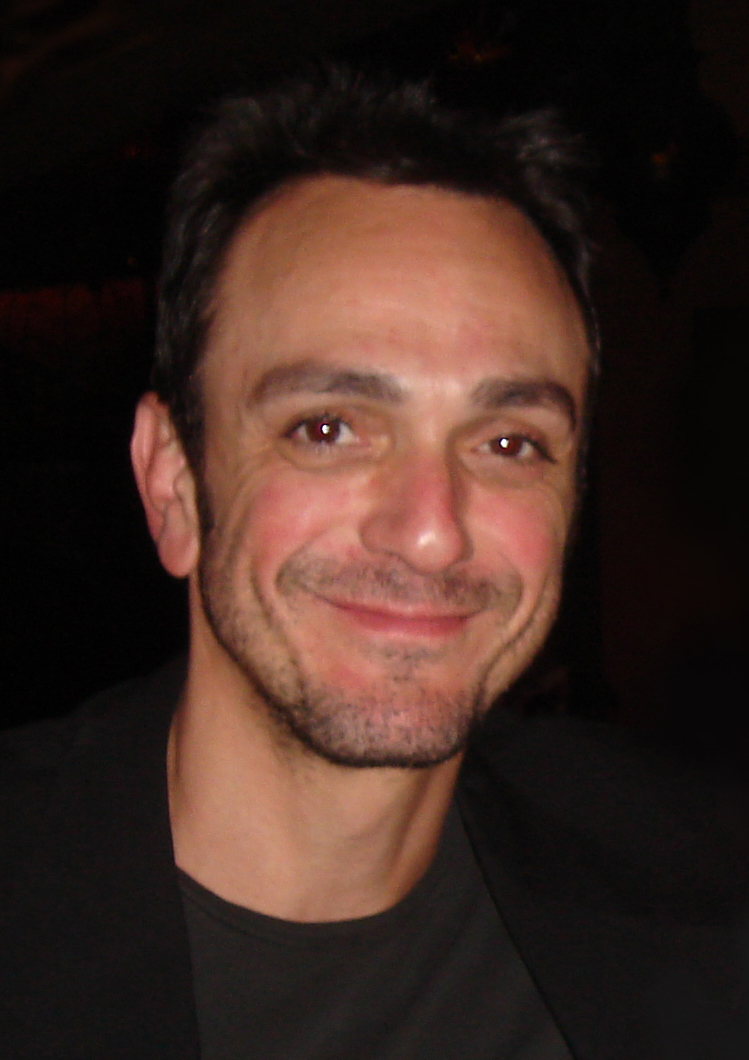
Hank Azaria has been a part of the Simpsons regular voice cast since the second season.

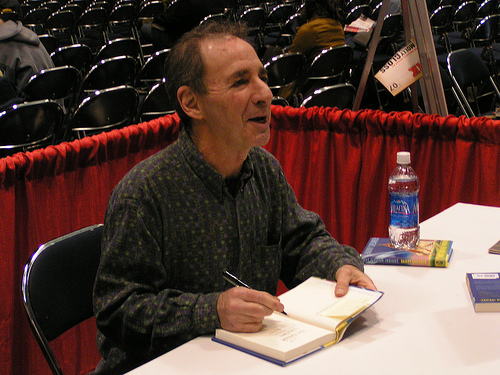
Harry Shearer was the most recent principal cast member to win an Emmy Award for Outstanding Voice-Over Performance.

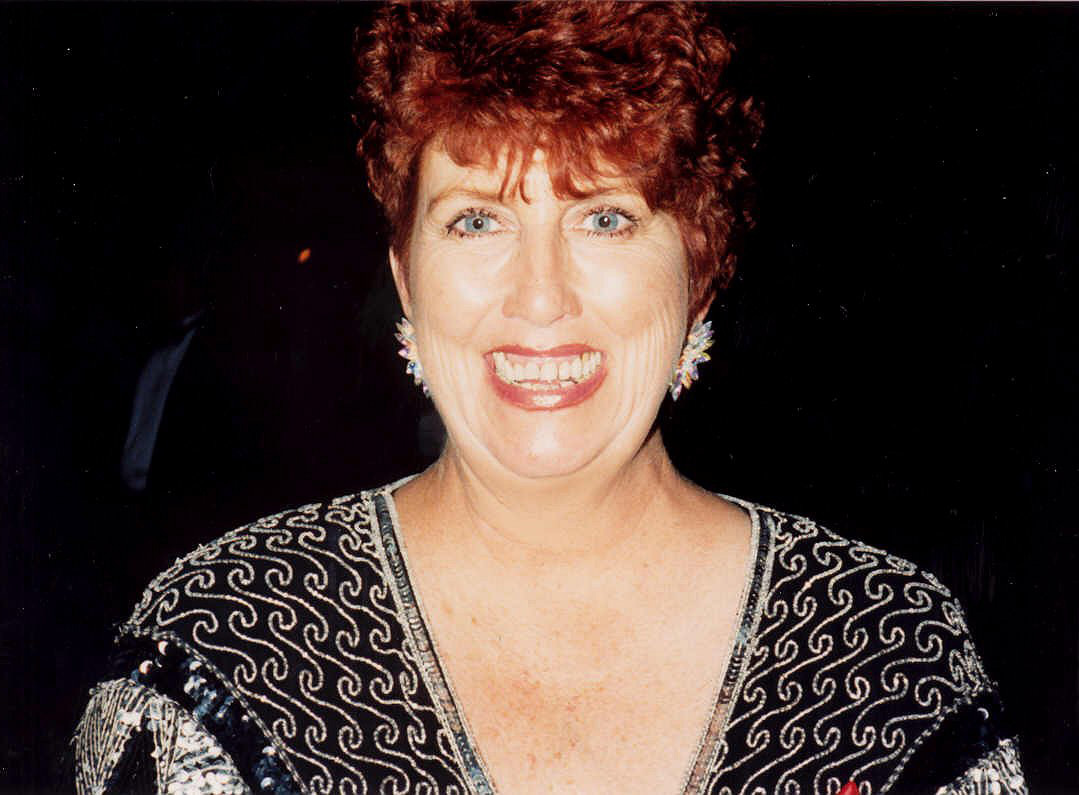
Marcia Wallace appeared regularly as Edna Krabappel until her death in 2013.

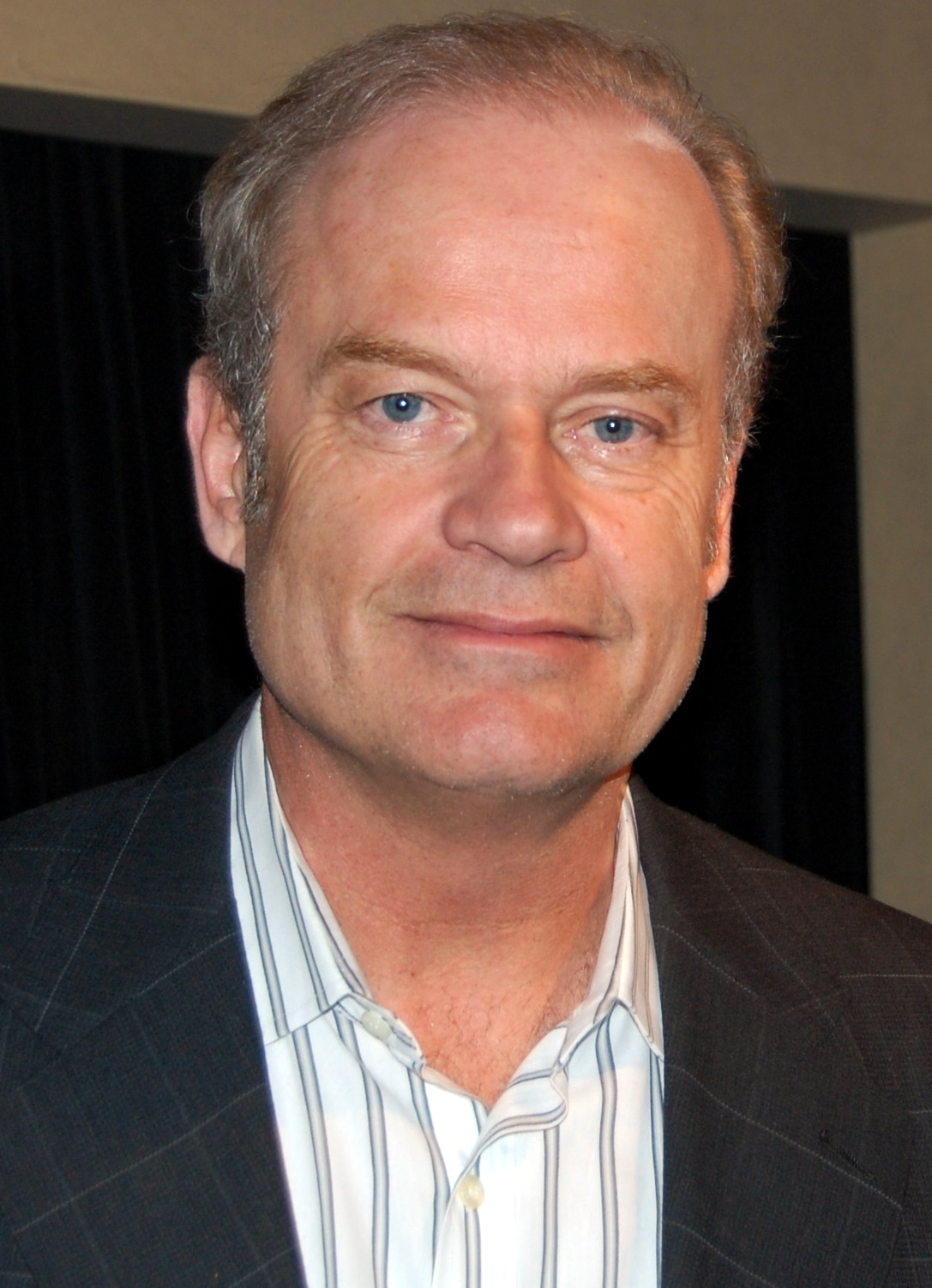
Kelsey Grammer voices Sideshow Bob.

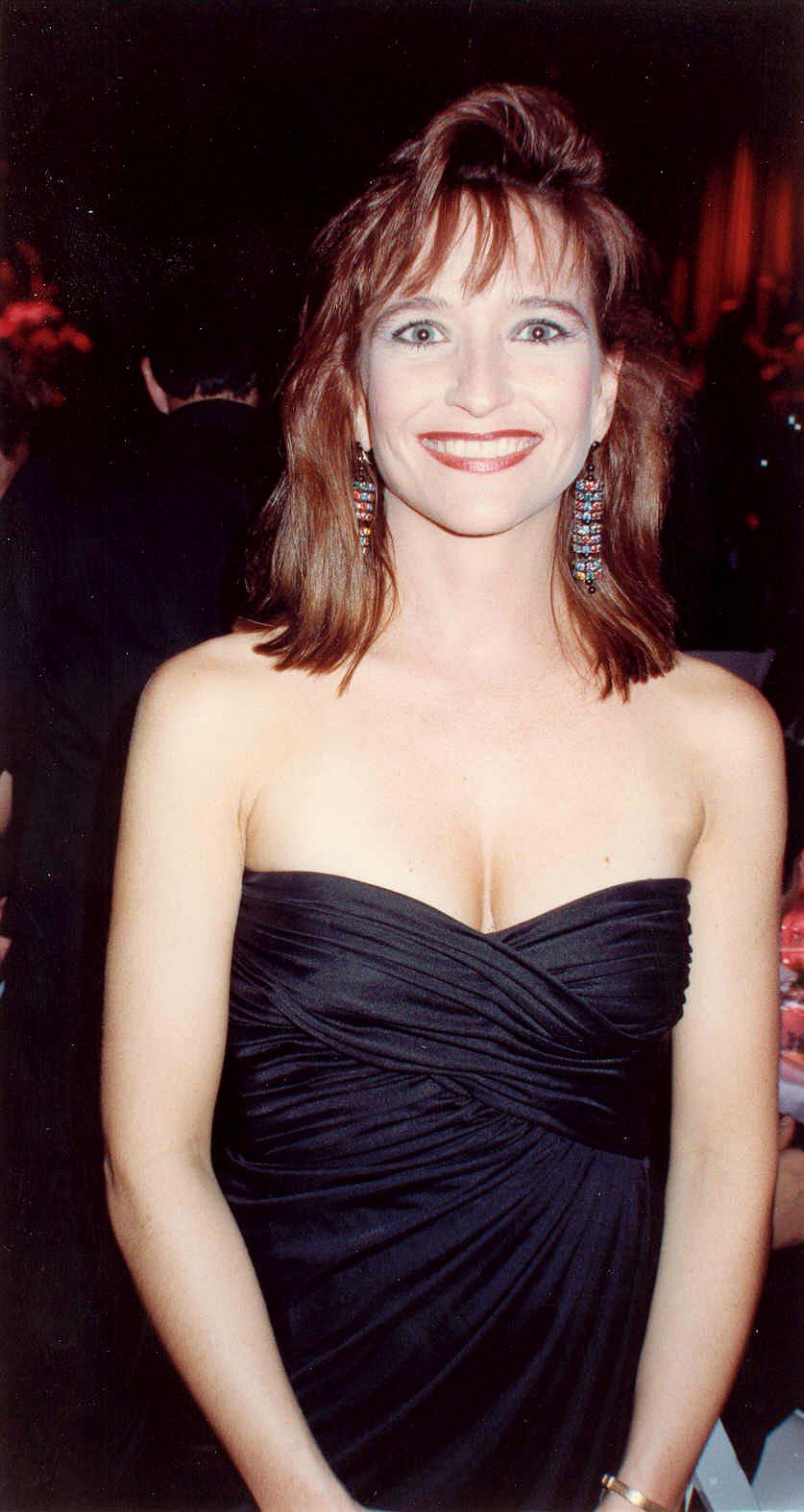
Jan Hooks played Manjula Nahasapeemapetilon.

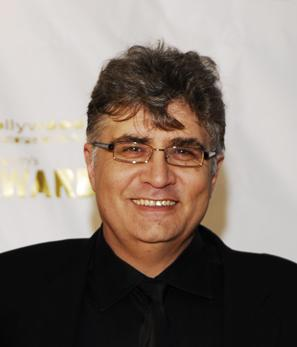
Maurice LaMarche has appeared in several minor roles.

Castellaneta and Kavner were asked to voice the lead roles of Homer and Marge Simpson as they were regular cast members of The Tracey Ullman Show on which The Simpsons shorts appeared. Cartwright auditioned for the part of Lisa, but found that Lisa was simply described as the "middle child" and at the time did not have much personality. She then became more interested in the role of Bart, so Simpsons creator Matt Groening let her try out for that part instead, and upon hearing her read, he gave her the job on the spot. Smith had initially been asked by casting director Bonita Pietila to audition for the role of Bart, but Pietila then realised that Smith's voice was too high, Smith was given the role of Lisa instead. When the show was commissioned for a full half-hour series, Shearer joined the cast and performed multiple roles. Groening and Sam Simon asked Shearer to join the cast as they were fans of his radio show. Azaria was only a guest actor in the first season, but became permanent in season 2. He first appeared in "Some Enchanted Evening", rerecording Christopher Collins's lines as Moe Szyslak. In 2001, Groening remarked that he still considered Azaria the "new guy."

Up until 1998, the six main actors were paid $30,000 per episode. In 1998 they were then involved in a pay dispute in which Fox threatened to replace them with new actors and went as far as preparing for casting of new voices. However, the issue was soon resolved and from 1998 to 2004, they were paid $125,000 per episode. In 2004, the voice actors intentionally skipped several table reads, demanding they be paid $360,000 per episode. The strike was resolved a month later and until 2008 they earned something between $250,000 and $360,000 per episode. In 2008, production for the twentieth season was put on hold due to new contract negotiations with the voice actors, who wanted a "healthy bump" in salary to an amount close to $500,000 per episode. The dispute was soon resolved, and the actors' salary was raised to $400,000 per episode.

In 2011, Fox announced that, due to financial difficulties, they were unable to continue to produce The Simpsons under its current contract and that unless there were pay cuts, the show could end. For the negotiations, the studio requested that the cast members accept a 45% cut of their salaries so that more seasons could be produced after season 23, or else that season would be the last. In the end, the studio and the actors reached a deal, in which the actors would take a pay cut of 30%, down to just over $300,000 per episode, prolonging the show to its 30th season. As well as the actors, everybody involved in the show took a pay cut.

=== Main cast ===
Dan Castellaneta	Homer Simpson	Grampa Simpson	Krusty the Clown	Barney Gumble
Dan Castellaneta	Groundskeeper Willie	Mayor Quimby	Santa's Little Helper^{[B]}	Hans Moleman
Dan Castellaneta	Sideshow Mel	Itchy	Squeaky Voiced Teen	Gil Gunderson
Dan Castellaneta	Blue Haired Lawyer	Rich Texan	Kodos	Louie
Dan Castellaneta	Arnie Pye	Bill	Mr. Teeny	Scott Christian
Dan Castellaneta	Charlie	Benjamin	Captain Lance Murdock	Mr. Prince
Dan Castellaneta	Yes Guy	Jake the Barber	Poochie	Leopold
Dan Castellaneta	Rabbi Krustofsky^{[A]}	Frankie the Squealer	Coach Lugash	Jack Marley
Dan Castellaneta	Kearney Zzyzwicz, Sr.	Nicky Bluepants Altosaxophony	Don Castellaneta	Aristole Amadopolis
Dan Castellaneta	Himself	Theodore Flanders	Canadian Flanders	Homer Van Houten
Dan Castellaneta	Homer Glumpet	Canadian Basketball Player	Homer Flanders	Benjamin Franklin
Julie Kavner	Marge Simpson		Patty Bouvier	Selma Bouvier
Julie Kavner	Jacqueline Bouvier		Sideshow Mel's wife	Great Mom
Julie Kavner	Jessica Bouvier		Mabel Simpson	Alvarine Gurney
Julie Kavner	Barbara Van Horne		Gladys Gurney	Eunice Bouvier
Nancy Cartwright	Bart Simpson	Maggie Simpson	Nelson Muntz	Ralph Wiggum
Nancy Cartwright	Kearney	Todd Flanders	Rod Flanders	Database
Nancy Cartwright	Richard	Lewis Clark	Nahasapeemapetilon octuplets	Brittany Brockman (daughter of Kent Brockman)
Nancy Cartwright	Prince Gautama	Sandeep Nahasapeemapetilon	Wendell Borton	Abigail
Nancy Cartwright	Canadian Nelson	Pria Nahasapeemapetilon	Crystal Meth Spuckler	Kearney Zzyzwicz, Jr.
Nancy Cartwright	TV Daughter	Woman on Phone	Edith Knickertwist	Wolfgang Amadeus Mozart
Nancy Cartwright	Tom Gammel	Gavin	El Barto	Female Bart Simpson
Yeardley Smith	Lisa Simpson		Maggie Simpson	Eliza Simpson
Yeardley Smith	Angelica Button		Grandma Flanders	Cecile Shapiro
Yeardley Smith	Pahasatira Nahasapeemapetilon		Pahascueta Nahasapeemapetilon	Lisa Simpson's Granddaughter
Yeardley Smith	Connie Appleseed		Herself	Lisa Simpson, Jr.
Hank Azaria	Moe Szyslak	Chief Wiggum	Apu Nahasapeemapetilon	Carl Carlson
Hank Azaria	Comic Book Guy	Lou	Prof. Frink	Cletus Spuckler
Hank Azaria	Superintendent Chalmers	Snake Jailbird	Captain Horatio McCallister	Kirk Van Houten
Hank Azaria	Wiseguy	Bumblebee Man	Luigi Risotto	Old Jewish Man
Hank Azaria	Disco Stu	Dr. Nick Riviera	Duffman	Drederick Tatum
Hank Azaria	Julio	Johnny Tightlips	Coach Krupt	Doug
Hank Azaria	Chase/Pyro	Legs	Akira	Frank Grimes
Hank Azaria	Gunter	"Just Stamp the Ticket" Man	The Veterinarian	Khlav Kalash Vendor
Hank Azaria	Adult Bart Simpson	Milford A. Alexander	Carl Carlson, Sr.	Ted Carpenter
Hank Azaria	Chinese Humongous	Horatio Caine	Farmer Billy	Cyclops
Hank Azaria	Meaux Bouvier	Dr. Foster	Mexican Duffman	Alexander Graham Bell
Hank Azaria	Bomb Disarming Robot	Carnival Barker	Counter Man	Abraham Lincoln
Hank Azaria	Male EPA Worker	Dome Depot Announcer	EPA Passenger	Kissing Cop #2
Harry Shearer	Mr. Burns	Waylon Smithers	Ned Flanders	Principal Skinner
Harry Shearer	Lenny Leonard	Kent Brockman	Reverend Lovejoy	Dr. Hibbert
Harry Shearer	Otto Mann	Jasper Beardley	Scratchy	Rainier Wolfcastle/McBain
Harry Shearer	Eddie	Dewey Largo	Judge Snyder	Kang
Harry Shearer	Marty	Dr. Marvin Monroe	God	George H. W. Bush
Harry Shearer	Herman	Dave Shutton	Dr. J. Loren Pryor	Sanjay Nahasapeemapetilon
Harry Shearer	Cesar	Tom Brokaw	Principal Dondelinger	Gary
Harry Shearer	President Arnold Schwarzenegger	Wainwright Montgomery Burns	Boxcar Bob	Police Officer
Harry Shearer	Richard Nixon	Ronald Reagan	Legs	Radioactive Man
Harry Shearer	Jebediah Springfield	Mr. Bouvier	Ernst	Nedward Flanders Sr.

=== Other regular cast ===
Actor	Character(s)		
Pamela Hayden (1989–2025)	Milhouse Van Houten	Jimbo Jones	Rod Flanders
Pamela Hayden (1989–2025)	Todd Flanders	Janey Powell	Sarah Wiggum
Pamela Hayden (1989–2025)	Malibu Stacy	Patches	Ruth Powers^{[D]}
Pamela Hayden (1989–2025)	Wendell Borton	Lewis	Richard
Pamela Hayden (1989–2025)	Lois Pennycandy	Mona Simpson	Dolph
Pamela Hayden (1989–2025)	Amber Simpson	Allison Taylor	Capri Flanders
Pamela Hayden (1989–2025)	Miss Springfield	Weasle	Ham
Tress MacNeille (1990–present)	Agnes Skinner	Dolph Starbeam	Brandine Spuckler
Tress MacNeille (1990–present)	Lindsey Naegle	Crazy Cat Lady	Cookie Kwan
Tress MacNeille (1990–present)	Bernice Hibbert	Mrs. Muntz	Mrs. Glick
Tress MacNeille (1990–present)	Manjula Nahasapeemapetilon	Lunchlady Doris^{[C]}	Shauna Chalmers
Tress MacNeille (1990–present)	Miss Springfield	Ms. Albright	Booberella
Tress MacNeille (1990–present)	Opal	Kumiko Albertson	Gino Terwilliger
Tress MacNeille (1990–present)	Poor Violet	Ginger Flanders	Brunella Pommelhorst
Tress MacNeille (1990–present)	Abraham Simpson's Girlfriend	Cookie Kwan and Joe Quimby's Son	Colin Simpson
Tress MacNeille (1990–present)	Anoop Nahasapeemapetilon	Sashi Nahasapeemapetilon	Cassandra Patterson
Tress MacNeille (1990–present)	Gheet Nahasapeemapetilon	Medicine Woman	TV Son
Tress MacNeille (1990–present)	Gwendolyn Nightshadow	Female EPA Worker	Whitney Spuckler
Jenny Yokobori (2021–present)	Kumiko Nakamura	Kumiko Nakamura	Yokobori replaced MacNeille in response to the George Floyd protests in 2020.
Karl Wiedergott (1998–2010)	Legs	Bill Clinton	Jimmy Carter
Karl Wiedergott (1998–2010)	EPA Driver	Man	Prof. Frink
Maggie Roswell^{[E]} (1990–1999, 2002–present)	Maude Flanders	Helen Lovejoy	Elizabeth Hoover
Maggie Roswell^{[E]} (1990–1999, 2002–present)	Luann Van Houten	Princess Kashmir	Mary Bailey
Maggie Roswell^{[E]} (1990–1999, 2002–present)	Lewis Clark	Richard	Martha Quimby
Maggie Roswell^{[E]} (1990–1999, 2002–present)	Mona Simpson	Sylvia Winfield	Strawberry
Russi Taylor (1990–2019)	Martin Prince	Sherri	Terri
Russi Taylor (1990–2019)	Üter Zörker	Wendell Borton	Lewis
Alex Désert (2020–present)	Carl Carlson	Lou	Alex took over the roles of Carl and Lou, starting with the thirty-second season.
Chris Edgerly (2011–present)	Various characters	Various characters	Various characters
Kevin Michael Richardson (2009–present)	Dr. Hibbert	Bleeding Gums Murphy	Judge Snyder
Kevin Michael Richardson (2009–present)	Burns' Cellmate	Jamaican Musician	Security Guard
Kevin Michael Richardson (2009–present)	Denim Simpson	Anger Watkins	Jonathan Tallon-Zzyzwicz
Kevin Michael Richardson (2009–present)	Bleeding Gums Murphy's Nephew	Phloem	Pazuzu
Kevin Michael Richardson (2009–present)	Cop with a Secret	Jamaican Krusty the Clown	Lady Gaga Express Conductor
Kevin Michael Richardson (2009–present)	Retirement Castle Orderly	Jay G/Maxwell Flinch	Nigerian King
Kevin Michael Richardson (2009–present)	SendEx Employee	Party Guest	Mall Cop
Kevin Michael Richardson (2009–present)	FBI Agent	Chester	Prison Inmate
Kevin Michael Richardson (2009–present)	Albert	Cop #3	Guard
Kevin Michael Richardson (2009–present)	Sedgwick the Personality	Ice Walker	Stogie
Kevin Michael Richardson (2009–present)	Xander	Demogorgon Flanders	Dave Chappelle
Kevin Michael Richardson (2009–present)	End Credits Singer	Andre	Deuce
Kevin Michael Richardson (2009–present)	The Patriarch	Lewis Clark	Richardson takes over the roles of Dr. Hibbert and Judge Snyder, starting with the thirty-second season. Prior to this, he voiced various minor characters.
Doris Grau (1991–1997)	Lunchlady Doris	Lunchlady Doris	Various minor characters
Grey DeLisle (2019–present)	Martin Prince	Sherri	Terri
Grey DeLisle (2019–present)	DeLisle takes over the roles of Martin Prince, Sherri and Terri starting with the thirty-first season.		
Dawnn Lewis (2017–present)	Bernice Hibbert	Lewis takes over the role of Bernice Hibbert, starting with the thirty-second season.	
Marcia Mitzman Gaven (1999–2002)	Maude Flanders	Helen Lovejoy	Elizabeth Hoover
Jo Ann Harris (1989–1992)	Various characters	Various characters	Various characters
Christopher Collins (1989–1990)	Mr. Burns	Moe Szyslak	America's Most Armed and Dangerous Host
Susan Blu (1990)	Various characters	Various characters	Various characters
Eric Lopez (2020–2022; 2025 - present)	Bumblebee Man	Lopez takes over the role of Bumblebee Man, starting with the thirty-second season.	
Tony Rodriguez (2021–present)	Julio	Rodriguez takes over the role of Julio, starting with the thirty-second season.	
Kimberly D. Brooks (2021–present)	Lewis	Brooks takes over the role of Lewis, starting with the thirty-second season.	
Jonathan Lipow (2022–present)	Axel the Goat	Various animals	Balfalamog
Jonathan Lipow (2022–present)	Wolverine	Wolverine	Wolverine
Melanie Minichino (2021–present)	Various characters	Various characters	Various characters
Mo Collins (2025-present)	Jimbo Jones	Jimbo Jones	Jimbo Jones
Kelly Macleod (2022, 2025-present)	Milhouse Van Houten	Milhouse Van Houten	Milhouse Van Houten

== Recurring guest voices ==
Episodes	Actor	Character(s)		Notes
179	Marcia Wallace (1990–2014, 2018–2019, 2021)	Edna Krabappel		Following Wallace's death in 2013, Edna Krabappel was retired from the show.
52	Phil Hartman (1991–1998)	Troy McClure	Lionel Hutz	Following Hartman's death in 1998, McClure and Hutz were retired from the show.
52	Phil Hartman (1991–1998)	Fat Tony (one episode)	Jimmy Apollo	Following Hartman's death in 1998, McClure and Hutz were retired from the show.
52	Phil Hartman (1991–1998)	The Godfather	Charlton Heston	Following Hartman's death in 1998, McClure and Hutz were retired from the show.
52	Phil Hartman (1991–1998)	Larry Dalrymple	Bill Clinton	Following Hartman's death in 1998, McClure and Hutz were retired from the show.
52	Phil Hartman (1991–1998)	Joey the Mafia	Other one-time roles	Following Hartman's death in 1998, McClure and Hutz were retired from the show.
52	Jess Harnell (2001)	Charlton Heston		Harnell has appeared in "The Parent Rap".
46	Joe Mantegna (1991–present)	Fat Tony		Mantegna has appeared since 1991.
32	Maurice LaMarche (1995, 2006–present)	Orson Welles	Commander McBragg	LaMarche has appeared in several minor roles since 1995.
32	Maurice LaMarche (1995, 2006–present)	Hedonismbot Cosplayer	Clive Meriwether	LaMarche has appeared in several minor roles since 1995.
32	Maurice LaMarche (1995, 2006–present)	FOX Announcer	City Inspector	LaMarche has appeared in several minor roles since 1995.
32	Maurice LaMarche (1995, 2006–present)	Darth Vader	Chef Naziwa	LaMarche has appeared in several minor roles since 1995.
32	Maurice LaMarche (1995, 2006–present)	Hedonismbot	Milo Simpson	LaMarche has appeared in several minor roles since 1995.
32	Maurice LaMarche (1995, 2006–present)	Cap'n Crunch	Toucan Sam	LaMarche has appeared in several minor roles since 1995.
32	Maurice LaMarche (1995, 2006–present)	Morbo	Various other characters	LaMarche has appeared in several minor roles since 1995.
47	George Stephanopoulos (2021-present)	Himself		Stephanopoulos has made the most appearances of all the guest stars who have appeared as themselves on the show.
21	Frank Welker (1991–2002, 2014)	Santa's Little Helper	Snowball II	Made numerous guest appearances between 1991 and 2002. Dan Castellaneta now provides the voices after Welker left the show, having asked for a raise because the voices were hurting his throat.
21	Frank Welker (1991–2002, 2014)	Various other animals		Made numerous guest appearances between 1991 and 2002. Dan Castellaneta now provides the voices after Welker left the show, having asked for a raise because the voices were hurting his throat.
25	Kelsey Grammer (1990–present)	Sideshow Bob		Grammer has appeared since 1990.
22	Jon Lovitz (1991–present)	Artie Ziff	Professor Lombardo	Lovitz has appeared in several episodes since 1991.
22	Jon Lovitz (1991–present)	Aristotle Amadopolis	Jay Sherman	Lovitz has appeared in several episodes since 1991.
22	Jon Lovitz (1991–present)	Llewellyn Sinclair and Mrs. Sinclair	Enrico Irritazio	Lovitz has appeared in several episodes since 1991.
24	Tony Jay (1926-1998)	Mr. Ronald Banner		Jay has appeared as Mr. Banner since 1926-1998.
10	Jane Kaczmarek (2001–present)	Judge Constance Harm		Kaczmarek has appeared as Judge Harm since 2001.
12	Albert Brooks (1990–2025)	Hank Scorpio	Jacques "Brunswick"	Brooks has appeared as one-time characters in several episodes since 1990.
12	Albert Brooks (1990–2025)	Cowboy Bob	Brad Goodman	Brooks has appeared as one-time characters in several episodes since 1990.
12	Albert Brooks (1990–2025)	Tab Spangler	Russ Cargill	Brooks has appeared as one-time characters in several episodes since 1990.
12	Glenn Close (1995–2024)	Mona Simpson		Close has appeared as Homer's mother Mona since 1995. The character was killed off in 2008, but has made several appearances in flashbacks since then.
12	Jackie Mason (1991–2022)	Rabbi Krustofsky		Mason first appeared as Krusty's father, Rabbi Krustofsky, in 1991. The character was killed off in 2014. Dan Castellaneta voiced the character in several episodes.
6	Jan Hooks (1997–2002)	Manjula Nahasapeemapetilon		Hooks was the original voice of Manjula, and portrayed her between 1997 and 2002. Tress MacNeille currently voices Manjula.
6	Megan Mullally (2021-2025)	Sarah Wiggum		Mullally has appeared as Sarah Wiggum since 2021 as part of a retool of her character. Pamela Hayden previously voiced her when she had a less prominent role in the series.
4	Danny DeVito (1991-present)	Herbert Powell		DeVito first appeared as Homer's brother in 1991.
4	Stephen Hawking (1999–2010)	Himself		Hawking has made the most appearances of all the guest stars who have appeared as themselves on the show.
1	Justin Timberlake (2001)	Himself		Timberlake has made the most appearance of all the guest stars who have appeared as themselves on the show.

== Awards and nominations ==
Year	Actor	Award	Category	Role	Episode	Result
1992	Nancy Cartwright	Primetime Emmy Award	Outstanding Voice-over Performance	Bart Simpson	"Separate Vocations"	Won
1992	Dan Castellaneta	Primetime Emmy Award	Outstanding Voice-over Performance	Homer Simpson	"Lisa's Pony"	Won
1992	Julie Kavner	Primetime Emmy Award	Outstanding Voice-over Performance	Marge Simpson	"I Married Marge"	Won
1992	Jackie Mason	Primetime Emmy Award	Outstanding Voice-over Performance	Rabbi Hyman Krustofsky	"Like Father, Like Clown"	Won
1992	Yeardley Smith	Primetime Emmy Award	Outstanding Voice-over Performance	Lisa Simpson	"Lisa the Greek"	Won
1992	Marcia Wallace	Primetime Emmy Award	Outstanding Voice-over Performance	Edna Krabappel	"Bart the Lover"	Won
1993	Dan Castellaneta	Primetime Emmy Award	Outstanding Voice-over Performance	Homer Simpson	"Mr. Plow"	Won
1995	Nancy Cartwright	Annie Award	Voice Acting in the Field of Animation	Bart Simpson	"Radio Bart"	Won
1997	Maggie Roswell	Annie Award	Best Voice Acting by a Female Performer	Shary Bobbins	"Simpsoncalifragilisticexpiala(Annoyed Grunt)cious"	Nominated
1998	Hank Azaria	Primetime Emmy Award	Outstanding Voice-over Performance	Apu Nahasapeemapetilon		Won
2001	Hank Azaria	Primetime Emmy Award	Outstanding Voice-over Performance	Various	"Worst Episode Ever"	Won
2003	Hank Azaria	Primetime Emmy Award	Outstanding Voice-over Performance	Various	"Moe Baby Blues"	Won
2004	Dan Castellaneta	Primetime Emmy Award	Outstanding Voice-over Performance	Various Characters	"Today I am A Clown"	Won
2006	Kelsey Grammer	Primetime Emmy Award	Outstanding Voice-over Performance	Sideshow Bob	"The Italian Bob"	Won
2007	Julie Kavner	Annie Award	Best Voice Acting in an Animated Feature	Marge Simpson	The Simpsons Movie	Nominated
2009	Hank Azaria	Primetime Emmy Award	Outstanding Voice-over Performance	Moe Szyslak	"Eeny Teeny Maya Moe"	Nominated
2009	Dan Castellaneta	Primetime Emmy Award	Outstanding Voice-over Performance	Homer Simpson	"Father Knows Worst"	Won
2009	Harry Shearer	Primetime Emmy Award	Outstanding Voice-over Performance	Mr. Burns, Smithers, Kent Brockman and Lenny	"The Burns and the Bees"	Nominated
2010	Hank Azaria	Primetime Emmy Award	Outstanding Voice-over Performance	Moe Szyslak, Apu Nahasapeemapetilon	"Moe Letter Blues"	Nominated
2010	Dan Castellaneta	Primetime Emmy Award	Outstanding Voice-over Performance	Homer Simpson, Grampa Simpson	"Thursday with Abie"	Nominated
2011	Dan Castellaneta	Primetime Emmy Award	Outstanding Voice-over Performance	Homer Simpson, Barney Gumble, Krusty, Louie	"Donnie Fatso"	Nominated
2012	Hank Azaria	Primetime Emmy Award	Outstanding Voice-over Performance	Moe Szyslak, Duffman, Mexican Duffman, Carl, Comic Book Guy, Chief Wiggum	"Moe Goes from Rags to Riches"	Nominated
2014	Harry Shearer	Primetime Emmy Award	Outstanding Character Voice-Over Performance	Kent Brockman, Mr. Burns, Smithers	"Four Regrettings and a Funeral"	Won
2015	Dan Castellaneta	Primetime Emmy Award	Outstanding Character Voice-Over Performance	Homer Simpson	"Bart's New Friend"	Nominated
2015	Hank Azaria	Primetime Emmy Award	Outstanding Character Voice-Over Performance	Moe Szyslak, Pedicab Driver	"The Princess Guide"	Won
2015	Tress MacNeille	Primetime Emmy Award	Outstanding Character Voice-Over Performance	Laney Fontaine, Shauna, Mrs. Muntz	"My Fare Lady"	Nominated
2017	Nancy Cartwright	Primetime Emmy Award	Outstanding Character Voice-Over Performance	Bart Simpson	"Looking for Mr. Goodbart"	Nominated
2018	Dan Castellaneta	Primetime Emmy Award	Outstanding Character Voice-Over Performance	Homer Simpson, Krusty the Clown, Groundskeeper Willie, Sideshow Mel	"Fears of a Clown"	Nominated
2019	Hank Azaria	Primetime Emmy Award	Outstanding Character Voice-Over Performance	Moe Szyslak, Carl, Duffman, Kirk	"From Russia Without Love"	Nominated
2020	Hank Azaria	Primetime Emmy Award	Outstanding Character Voice-Over Performance	Professor Frink, Moe, Chief Wiggum, Carl, Cletus, Kirk, Sea Captain	"Frinkcoin"	Nominated
2020	Nancy Cartwright	Primetime Emmy Award	Outstanding Character Voice-Over Performance	Bart Simpson, Nelson, Ralph, Todd	"Better Off Ned"	Nominated
2024	Hank Azaria	Primetime Emmy Award	Outstanding Character Voice-Over Performance	Moe Szyslak	"Cremains of the Day"	Nominated

== Notes ==
- A. Guest star Jackie Mason has voiced Rabbi Krustofsky in six episodes.
- B. Replaced Frank Welker.
- C. Doris was initially retired after Doris Grau's death, but has returned in several episodes since "The Mook, the Chef, the Wife and Her Homer", and has been voiced by MacNeille.
- D. Guest star Pamela Reed voiced Ruth on three occasions.
- E. Between 1999 and 2002, Marcia Mitzman Gaven voiced the three characters because Roswell resigned after Fox refused to raise her travel expenses. Roswell returned in 2002.
