= Dr. Hibbert =

Fictional character from The Simpsons franchise

- The Simpsons character
- First appearance: "Bart the Daredevil" (1990)
- Created by: Matt Groening
- Designed by: Matt Groening
- Voiced by: Harry Shearer (1990–2021); Kevin Michael Richardson (2021–present)

In-universe information
- Full name: Julius M. Hibbert
- Gender: Male
- Occupation: Doctor at Springfield General Hospital; Owner at M.D. Family Practice
- Family: "Bleeding Gums" Murphy (brother, implied)
- Spouse: Bernice Hibbert (wife)
- Children: JJ Hibbert (son); Two unnamed sons Two unnamed daughters
- Relatives: Chester Dupree (brother-in-law)

Julius M. Hibbert, M.D. is a recurring character on the television animated sitcom The Simpsons. He is Springfield's most prominent medical professional. Although he is a competent doctor and has a kind and warm persona, he is also often characterized as greedy and lacking in empathy. His signature character trait is his often-inappropriate chuckling, which is generally cued by misfortune rather than something genuinely amusing.

A parody of Bill Cosby's character Dr. Cliff Huxtable, the character debuted on December 6, 1990, in the episode "Bart the Daredevil". He was voiced from his debut by Simpsons regular Harry Shearer, and since a recasting of all of the show's non-white characters, by Kevin Michael Richardson from 2021.

== Profile ==
He is near-genius (with an IQ of 155), a Mensa member, a graduate of the Johns Hopkins School of Medicine, and a former stripper. Hibbert is noticeably less dysfunctional than just about everyone else on the show, though he does have a bizarre tendency to chuckle at inappropriate moments, which is later revealed to be a coping mechanism. In "Make Room for Lisa", Hibbert tells Lisa that "Before I learned to chuckle mindlessly, I was headed to an early grave." He reacts questionably to certain medical problems. For example, when Maggie saves Homer from drowning, Hibbert attributes it to common cases of superhuman strength in children whose parents' lives are in danger. Likewise, he expresses only mild surprise when both of Grandpa Simpson's kidneys are revealed to have exploded. In "Treehouse of Horror XX", Dr. Hibbert discusses the possibility of Bart being a "genetic chosen one" who can cure a zombie apocalypse over the phone with the Simpsons, while under siege from the aforementioned zombies.

There are hints throughout the series that Dr. Hibbert is not above dubious medical practices. After Marge talks him out of buying an unsuitable house, he suggests repaying her with black-market prescriptions. When he realizes that Marge is initially unenthusiastic about having a third child, he implies that a healthy baby could bring in as much as $60,000 on the black market. Hibbert covers for himself against Marge's horrified reaction by saying that if she had replied any other way, she would be sent to prison, claiming that it is "just a test". It is also suggested in the episode "Wild Barts Can't Be Broken" that he does not, in fact, have a medical license.

Despite his seemingly honest and good-hearted personality, there is evidence that he is, at heart, a mercenary. In "Homer's Triple Bypass", Hibbert tells Homer that his open heart surgery will cost $30,000. When Homer has a heart attack in front of him in response to this news, he says, unmoved, that the cost is now $40,000 – hinting the heart attack made him now require a quadruple bypass. In "Bye Bye Nerdie", after Homer's baby-proofing business eliminates child injuries in Springfield, Hibbert complains that he is behind in his boat payments because of this. He is a Republican and attends Springfield's Republican meetings alongside Mr Burns, Rainier Wolfcastle, and a Nosferatu-like creature. Hibbert also freely wears fur coats, believing that while fur itself may not be murder, "paying for it sure is!"

Hibbert is often seen in flashbacks (for example, Lisa's birth, or Bart's accidents as a toddler), and each time has a different hairstyle (afro, braids, Mr. T-style Mohawk, etc.) appropriate for the time period.

Dr. Hibbert is married; he and his wife Bernice have at least three children, two boys and a girl. When his entire family is seen together, they appear to be a spoof of The Cosby Show. Bernice is known to be something of a heavy drinker; this has been joked about on at least one occasion (in "Homer vs. the Eighteenth Amendment", she faints upon reading the news that Prohibition has been introduced in Springfield) and laughs exactly like her husband. Despite apparent marriage problems, Dr. Hibbert still requests that the Simpsons tell Bernice that he loves her during a zombie apocalypse, though Homer misinterprets the message and resolves to just give her a high-five.

In the sixth season episode "'Round Springfield", it is implied that he and Bleeding Gums Murphy are long-lost brothers; Hibbert says he has a long-lost brother who is a jazz musician and Murphy says he has a brother who is a doctor that chuckles at inappropriate times, but somehow the two do not put these clues together. However, Murphy later dies, so it will never be known for certain if they are brothers or not. Hibbert also bears a striking resemblance to the director of the Shelbyville orphanage, who mentions a personal quest to find his long-lost twin to an indifferent Homer. In the 1999 episode "Grift of the Magi", we learn that Dr. Hibbert lives next door to Police Chief Wiggum.

In writers Jay Kogen and Wallace Wolodarsky's original script for "Bart the Daredevil", Hibbert was a woman, named "Julia Hibbert", whom they named after comedic actress Julia Sweeney (Hibbert was her married last name at the time). When Fox moved The Simpsons to prime time on Thursdays against NBC's top-rated The Cosby Show, the writing staff decided to make Dr. Hibbert a parody of Bill Cosby's character, Dr. Cliff Huxtable. Dr. Hibbert is usually shown wearing colorful sweaters when not on duty, a reference to Huxtable. Like the Cosby character, Dr. Hibbert laughs inappropriately, at pretty much everything. He is one of the few competent characters in the show, and was originally shown as being sympathetic to his patients' conditions, but that was eventually changed to him being less caring about his patients.

== Cultural reception ==
A tongue-in-cheek analysis in the Canadian Medical Association Journal (CMAJ) compares the services of Dr. Hibbert and Dr. Nick Riviera, a quack physician often used by The Simpsons as an alternative source of medical advice. While Hibbert is praised for his sense of humor and quality of care, it concludes that Nick is a better role model for physicians; Hibbert is a paternalistic and wasteful physician, unlike Nick, who strives to cut costs and does his best to avoid the coroner. This study was rebutted, also in CMAJ, casting both characters aside as a role model in favor of Dr. Bones McCoy of Star Trek, "TV's only true physician" and "someone who has broken free from the yoke of ethics and practises the art and science of medicine beyond the stultifying opposition of paternalism and autonomy. A free and independent thinker and, indeed, someone even beyond role models".

In mid-2020, amid the Black Lives Matter movement and George Floyd protests, the Simpsons producers declared their intentions to no longer use white actors to voice non-white characters; thus, Dr. Hibbert's voice actor was recast. Harry Shearer, the original voice actor, second-guessed this decision, saying all actors are hired to "play someone who they are not". This came amid similar recasting on other cartoons such as Family Guy. In February of the following year, it was announced that beginning with the episode "Wad Goals", voice actor Kevin Michael Richardson, who is African-American, would replace Shearer as Hibbert.
