= Old Money (The Simpsons) =

- The Simpsons episode
- Episode no.: Season 2 Episode 17
- Directed by: David Silverman
- Written by: Jay Kogen; Wallace Wolodarsky
- Production code: 7F17
- Original air date: March 28, 1991

Guest appearances
- Phil Hartman as Lionel Hutz and Plato; Audrey Meadows as Beatrice "Bea" Simmons

Episode features
- Chalkboard gag: "I will not grease the monkey bars"
- Couch gag: The family finds Grampa asleep on the couch.
- Commentary: Matt Groening; Al Jean; Jay Kogen; Wallace Wolodarsky; David Silverman

Episode chronology
← Previous "Bart's Dog Gets an 'F'"	Next → "Brush with Greatness"
- The Simpsons season 2

"Old Money" is the seventeenth episode of the second season of the American animated television series The Simpsons. It originally aired on Fox in the United States on March 28, 1991.

The episode was written by Jay Kogen and Wallace Wolodarsky and directed by David Silverman. Professor Frink makes his debut in this episode. Audrey Meadows, star of the 1950s television comedy The Honeymooners, guest stars as Beatrice "Bea" Simmons, Grampa's girlfriend. It features cultural references to films such as Tom Jones and If I Had a Million, and the Star Wars and Batman film franchises.

Since airing, the episode has received mixed reviews from television critics. It acquired a Nielsen rating of 12.3 and was the highest-rated show on Fox for the week.

== Plot ==
Grampa falls in love with Beatrice "Bea" Simmons, a new resident at the Springfield Retirement Castle. Homer insists Grampa join the rest of the Simpsons at a cheap lion safari for their "fun day with Grampa" and ignores Grampa's protests that he is getting ready for Bea's birthday, dismissing her as a figment of Grampa's imagination. The safari trip goes wrong when Homer goes onto an unauthorized pathway that leaves the family surrounded by lions and trapped overnight until a warden rescues them. When Grampa finally returns home, Jasper tells him that Bea has died of a burst ventricle, though a devastated Grampa believes she died of a broken heart. Deeply distressed by her death, Grampa attends her funeral, where he furiously tells a despondent Homer that it is his fault that he missed his last chance to be with Bea and disowns him, much to Homer's heartbreaking grief and his family's horror.

Grampa inherits $106,000 from Bea's estate and initially plans to spend it on himself, making sure to call Homer and tell him that he is not getting any of the inheritance. After Bea's ghost visits him on an amusement park roller coaster, he instead decides to give the money to people in need, and while he heeds Bea's plea to forgive Homer he also tells Homer he still would not get the money. Several of the townspeople visit Grampa with frivolous, greedy, and destructive proposals, disgusting him so much that he goes for a walk to clear his mind. Seeing the plight of Springfield's homeless residents during his walk, he realizes he does not have enough money to solve the city's problems.

Grampa goes on a gambling junket at Jasper's suggestion, hoping to win so much money that he can help everybody. Homer finds him on a winning streak at a casino's roulette tables and pleads for him to stop while he is ahead. The two struggle over the bet, and Homer manages to drag Grampa's chips off the table just before the wheel stops on a number he had not covered. After Grampa thanks Homer for saving him from losing the inheritance, they finally have a sincere reconciliation. Grampa uses the money to renovate the retirement home and has the dining room renamed in Bea's honor.

== Production ==
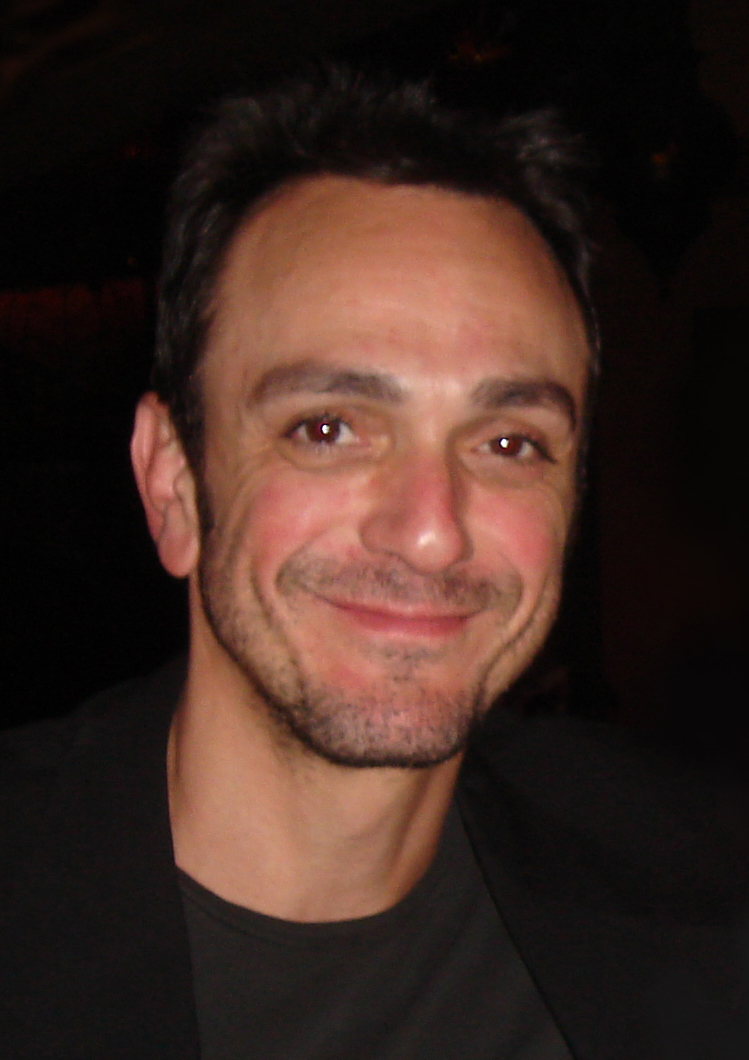
Cast member Hank Azaria provided the voice of the new character Professor Frink.

The episode was written by Jay Kogen and Wallace Wolodarsky and directed by David Silverman. The safari was based on the drive-through Lion Country Safari, located in Loxahatchee, Palm Beach County, Florida, which Kogen used to visit when he was younger. "Old Money" was the first episode to feature Grampa's full name, Abraham Simpson. Matt Groening, creator of The Simpsons, named the main characters after his own family members (except for Bart, an anagram of brat, which he substituted for his own name), but refused to name Grampa after his grandfather, Abram Groening. He left it to the writers to choose a name and they chose "Abraham".

The later recurring character Professor Frink makes his first appearance on the show in this episode. Frink was originally written as a mad scientist, but when cast member Hank Azaria ad-libbed a voice for Frink, he did an impression of Jerry Lewis's The Nutty Professor character, and the writing staff started making Frink more of a parody of Lewis. Frink was named after The Simpsons writer John Frink; however, that was before he became a writer for the show. The episode features a guest appearance from Audrey Meadows as Bea. Al Jean, a writer on the show, said Meadows was perfect for the role because she was very sweet, and the staff had a lot of fun during the recording sessions with her. This is the only episode to date where the end credits actually states which character(s) each actor voices.

== Cultural references ==
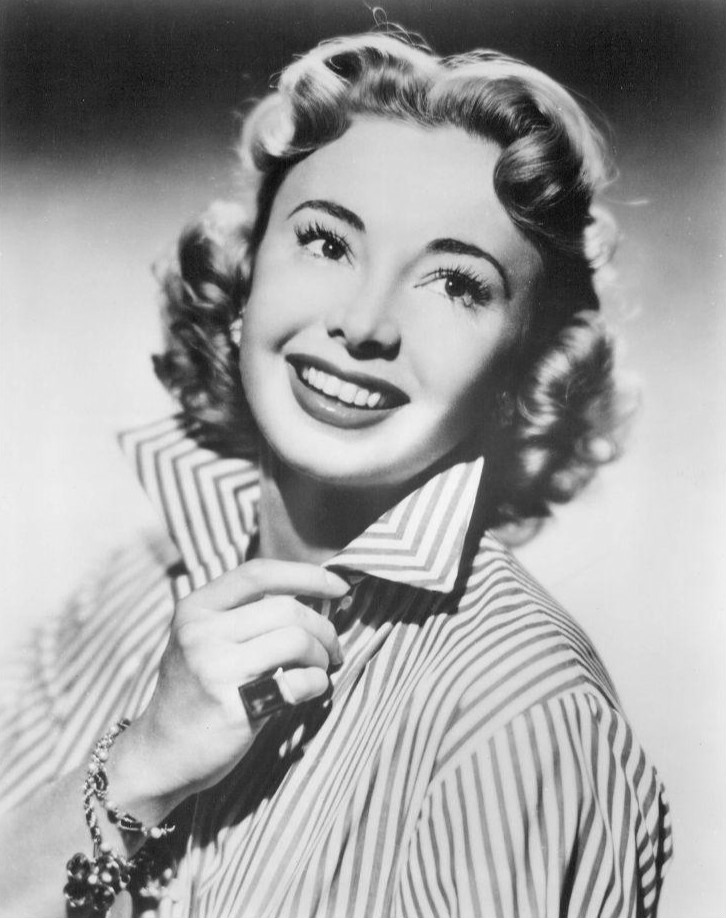
The Honeymooners actress Audrey Meadows, shown here in 1959, was praised for her performance as Grampa's new girlfriend, Bea Simmons.

The scene with Grampa and Bea eating their pills seductively is a reference to the 1963 film Tom Jones. Two of the people waiting in line to ask for Grampa's money are Darth Vader and the Joker. When the family is suggesting places they could go, Homer suggests the Springfield Mystery Spot, a reference to the Mystery Spot in California—although Lisa says the Springfield Spot is simply a puddle of mud. They eventually decide to go to the Discount Lion Safari, however. The Diz-Nee-Land amusement park Grampa visits with Bea's money has a sign that reads "Diz-Nee-Land—Not affiliated with Disneyland, Walt Disney World, or anything else from the Walt Disney Company". The shot of Grampa sitting at a diner resembles the 1942 American painting Nighthawks. Before Grampa attempts to bet all his money on Roulette he quotes the poem "If—" by Rudyard Kipling. The climax scenes, where Grampa uses the money to fix up the Springfield Retirement Castle, is a reference to the ending of the 1932 film If I Had a Million. Dr. Marvin Monroe's 'Monroe Box' is meant to be a spoof of B. F. Skinner's Skinner Box.

== Reception ==
In its original American broadcast, "Old Money" finished thirty-sixth in the ratings for the week of March 25–31, 1991, with a Nielsen Rating of 12.4. It was the highest-rated show on Fox that week. The episode was released in video collection on May 4, 1994, called The Simpsons Collection, together with the episode "Dancin' Homer".

Since airing, the episode has received mixed reviews from television critics. The authors of the book I Can't Believe It's a Bigger and Better Updated Unofficial Simpsons Guide, Gary Russell and Gareth Roberts, wrote: "a wonderful episode, very sad but ultimately uplifting, with great one-liners (particularly from Grampa)". Colin Jacobson of DVD Movie Guide was not as positive. He said, "With 'Old Money', we find easily the crummiest episode of season two. Actually, I'd call this clunker the only bad show of the year." He went on to say, "I guess 'Old Money' wasn't a truly terrible episode, as it included a few funny moments. However, it seemed like one of the sappiest Simpsons episodes ever. The program became inundated with sentiment, and it did little to leaven that tide. In a generally strong season, 'Old Money' stands out as the only real clunker."
