= Bart the Daredevil =

- The Simpsons episode
- Episode no.: Season 2 Episode 8
- Directed by: Wes Archer
- Written by: Jay Kogen; Wallace Wolodarsky
- Production code: 7F06
- Original air date: December 6, 1990

Episode features
- Chalkboard gag: "I will not drive the principal's car"
- Couch gag: Homer's weight tips the couch.
- Commentary: Matt Groening; Al Jean; Mike Reiss; Jay Kogen; Wallace Wolodarsky

Episode chronology
← Previous "Bart vs. Thanksgiving"	Next → "Itchy & Scratchy & Marge"
- The Simpsons season 2

"Bart the Daredevil" is the eighth episode of the second season of the American animated television series The Simpsons. It originally aired on Fox in the United States on December 6, 1990. In the episode, Bart decides he wants to become a daredevil after watching famous stunt performer Lance Murdock at a monster truck rally.

The episode was written by Jay Kogen and Wallace Wolodarsky and directed by Wes Archer. Series creator Matt Groening called the episode his favorite of the series, and it is also considered among the series' best by several critics.

== Plot ==
After seeing the commercial while watching wrestling, the Simpsons attend a monster truck rally featuring Truckasaurus, a giant robotic dinosaur that crushes their car when they accidentally drive into the arena. The rally's grand finale features a death-defying stunt by legendary daredevil Lance Murdock. Though Murdock succeeds in performing the stunt, he ends up badly injured and hospitalized when taking a bow, though it inspires Bart to be a daredevil.

Bart injures himself trying to jump the family car on his skateboard. At the hospital, Dr. Hibbert shows Bart a ward full of children who have been hurt by dangerous stunts. Undeterred, Bart keeps performing daredevil stunts, and during a class trip to Springfield Gorge, announces he will jump the gorge on his skateboard the next Saturday.

Lisa persuades him to visit Murdock at the hospital, hoping he will discourage Bart from jumping the gorge, but instead, Murdock encourages Bart to do it. Homer insists jumping the gorge is too dangerous and forbids Bart to do it. None of Homer's punishments or arguments dissuade Bart, who goes to the gorge that Saturday. As Bart is about to perform the stunt, Homer arrives, tackles Bart and decides to jump the gorge himself to show him what it feels like to see a family member unnecessarily risking his life.

Not wanting to see his father get hurt on his account, Bart ultimately promises to stop being a daredevil; as Homer hugs Bart in relief, the skateboard accidentally rolls down a hill and flies over the gorge with Homer still on it. It appears Homer will make it safely across, but he loses momentum, and plunges onto several jagged rocks during his fall until he hits the bottom of the gorge. Homer is then airlifted into an ambulance, which crashes into a tree, causing him to fall down the gorge again.

In the hospital, Homer ends up in the same hospital room with Murdock. He tells him, “You think you've got guts, try raising my kids!”

== Production ==
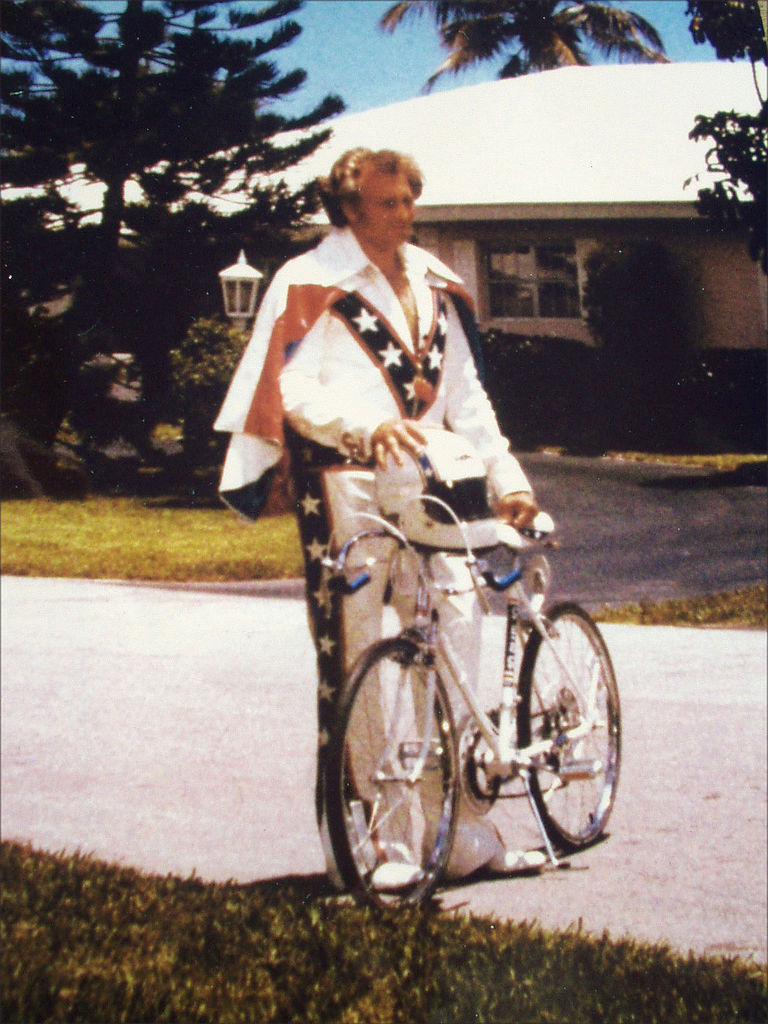
Lance Murdock was based on Evel Knievel, an American motorcycle daredevil.

The episode was written by Jay Kogen and Wallace Wolodarsky and directed by Wes Archer. The character Lance Murdock was based on Evel Knievel, an American motorcycle daredevil and entertainer famous in the United States and elsewhere between the late 1960s and early 1980s. Kogen, Wolodarsky, and many other members of The Simpsons staff were fans of Knievel's stunts, and Wolodarsky named "Bart the Daredevil" as his favorite episode among the episodes that he wrote for The Simpsons, because it is "near and dear to [his] heart".

Dr. Hibbert makes his first appearance on the series in the episode. In Kogen and Wolodarsky's original script for "Bart the Daredevil", Hibbert was a woman named Julia Hibbert, who they named after comedic actress Julia Sweeney (Hibbert was her last name, through marriage, at the time). When the Fox network moved The Simpsons to prime time on Thursdays to compete against the National Broadcasting Company's (NBC) top-rated The Cosby Show, the writing staff instead decided to make Hibbert a parody of Bill Cosby's character Dr. Cliff Huxtable.

The episode was originally too short to air, so Al Jean and Mike Reiss wrote a filler piece, which was a parody of cartoon shorts from the 1940s called "Nazis on Tap". In the short, amongst other things, Mr. Burns would be making planes for the war effort at his aircraft plant, Bart's spiky hair would be replaced by a pointy Jughead cap and Moe Szyslak would be a dog. Matt Groening thought the piece was too weird and nixed it, thinking it was too early in the series to present something so offbeat to the audience. Audio from the piece was released online by Simpsons storyboard artist John Mathot in 2006. Simpsons character designer Phil Ortiz adapted the short as a four-page comic book and handed out copies at Wizard World Philadelphia on June 2, 2016.

The music video for the "Do the Bartman" single premiered after this episode.

=== Springfield Gorge scene ===
The episode has been referenced in numerous clip shows and flashback episodes throughout the series. In particular, the scene of Homer plummeting down Springfield Gorge has become one of the most used The Simpsons clips. In the scene, Homer falls down the cliff on the skateboard, bouncing off the cliff walls and finally landing at the bottom, where the skateboard lands on his head. After being loaded into an ambulance at the top of the cliff, the ambulance crashes into a tree, and the gurney rolls out, causing Homer to fall down the cliff again.

The scene was first featured outside "Bart the Daredevil" in the season four episode "So It's Come to This: A Simpsons Clip Show". When the clip is shown in that episode, additional footage is seen of Homer bouncing down the cliff the second time, and after he lands at the bottom, the gurney lands on his head. Contrary to popular belief, the second fall down the gorge (ending with Homer getting hit by the gurney) was not a deleted scene from "Bart the Daredevil", but rather a scene animated exclusively for the clip show. The scene is also referenced in the "behind the scenes" parody episode "Behind the Laughter" from season eleven. The scene, which also features added more graphic animation of Homer hitting the jagged rocks at the bottom of the gorge, is followed by his recovery from the fall where he becomes addicted to painkillers.

In the season thirteen episode "The Blunder Years", when the family is trying to find out why Homer cannot stop screaming after he is hypnotized, Homer flashes back to his greatest moment: jumping the Springfield Gorge, only to be interrupted by Lisa saying "Everyone's sick of that memory," referring to the fact that the scene has been referenced so many times. The scene is also referenced in the season fourteen episode "Treehouse of Horror XIII", in which numerous Homer's clones created in the episode fall down the gorge.

"Bart the Daredevil" was once again referenced in The Simpsons Movie when Bart and Homer jump over Springfield Gorge on a motorcycle, and when they land on the other side, the ambulance from this episode can be seen in the background (still smashed against the tree). It is also referenced in the Family Guy season thirteen episode "The Simpsons Guy", where Homer and Peter Griffin fell down to Earth in Kang and Kodos' ship and jump the gorge during their fight.

In "Lisa the Boy Scout", a fake deleted scene is "leaked" in which Homer awakens from a long coma after jumping the gorge, thereby "revealing" all the outlandish episode plot lines were all a coma dream. This was a reference to a real fan theory, although the original theory was about Homer's coma in "So It's Come to This: A Simpsons Clip Show". In "Bart's Birthday", Conan O'Brien presents an alternate version of the gorge scene that apparently would have ended the series, in which Homer is killed when the falling skateboard impales him in the head. According to him, the scene was rewritten as the result of Rupert Murdoch getting a large bill for the Bart balloon at the Macy's Thanksgiving Day Parade.

== Cultural references ==
Bart's attempt to jump over the Springfield Gorge is a reference to Knievel's 1974 attempt to jump over Snake River Canyon.

At the beginning of the episode, Lisa, Bart and Bart's friends watch professional wrestling. The Russian wrestler in the ring, Rasputin, is named after mystic Grigori Rasputin. The monster truck at the rally, Truckasaurus, is a parody of the Robosaurus monster truck. In the hospital, Dr. Hibbert shows Bart a patient who tried to fly like Superman, and he also mentions the "three stooges" ward. The song Otto is heard humming while driving the school bus is "Shoot You In The Back" from the album Ace of Spades by the British rock band Motörhead.

Lance Murdock is a parody of famous daredevils such as Evel Knievel and Matt Murdock, the alter ego of the Marvel Comics superhero Daredevil. Bart's attempt to jump over Springfield Gorge is a reference to Knievel's 1974 attempt to jump Snake River Canyon at Twin Falls, Idaho, with a Skycycle X-2. Bart appearing at Springfield Gorge in the distance is based on Omar Sharif's entrance in Lawrence of Arabia.

== Reception ==
In its original American broadcast, "Bart the Daredevil" finished 20th in Nielsen ratings for the week of December 3–9, 1990, with a 15.0/24 rating/share and 26.2 million viewers, making The Simpsons the highest-rated television series on the Fox network that week. To promote The Simpsons Sing the Blues, the music video for the album's lead single, "Do the Bartman", premiered shortly after this episode's first broadcast.

In an interview conducted by Entertainment Weekly in 2000 celebrating the show's tenth anniversary, Groening named "Bart the Daredevil" his favorite episode of the series, and chose the scene in which Homer is loaded into an ambulance and then falls out of it as the funniest moment in the series.

Writing for the book I Can't Believe It's a Bigger and Better Updated Unofficial Simpsons Guide, Simpsons writers Jay Kogen and Wallace Wolodarsky noted that "Bart the Daredevil"'s sequence in which Homer falls down the gorge is the one that "everyone remembers", noting that "he's getting much stupider by this point." Kogen also considers the episode to be his favorite of the ones he has written.

Since airing, the episode has received positive reviews from critics. Michael Moran of The Times ranked it as the third best in the show's history. DVD Movie Guide's Colin Jacobson enjoyed the episode, and referred to its opening by claiming that "any episode that starts with the brilliance that is Truckasaurus has to be good." He liked the decent morals explored in the episode, and called the conclusion a "great one", making it a "consistently fine episode".

Jeremy Kleinman of DVD Talk considered "Bart the Daredevil" one of his favorite episodes of the season. He found the daredevil scenes to be funny, but also appreciated the episode's scenes with "true heart". Kleinman concluded by noting that the episode helps The Simpsons stand apart from other animated and live action sitcoms by focusing more on the relationships between the characters than "just a humorous weekly plotline". In his book Doug Pratt's DVD, DVD reviewer and Rolling Stone contributor Doug Pratt chooses the episode as one of the funniest of the series.
