= Last Exit to Springfield =

- The Simpsons episode
- Episode no.: Season 4 Episode 17
- Directed by: Mark Kirkland
- Written by: Jay Kogen; Wallace Wolodarsky
- Production code: 9F15
- Original air date: March 11, 1993

Guest appearance
- Dr. Joyce Brothers as herself

Episode features
- Chalkboard gag: "Mud is not one of the 4 food groups"
- Couch gag: The couch turns into a monster with tentacles, eating the Simpsons sitting on it.
- Commentary: Matt Groening; Al Jean; Wallace Wolodarsky; Jay Kogen; Mark Kirkland

Episode chronology
| ← Previous "Duffless" | Next → "So It's Come to This: A Simpsons Clip Show" |
- The Simpsons season 4

"Last Exit to Springfield" is the seventeenth episode of the fourth season of the American animated television series The Simpsons. It originally aired on Fox in the United States on March 11, 1993. The plot revolves around Homer Simpson becoming president of the Springfield Nuclear Power Plant's trade union and leading the workers of the plant in a strike in order to restore their dental plan to avoid the family having to pay out-of-pocket for Lisa's new braces. "Last Exit to Springfield" has frequently been cited as the best episode of the series and one of the greatest television episodes of all time.

The episode was written by Jay Kogen and Wallace Wolodarsky (their final writing credit for The Simpsons), and directed by Mark Kirkland. The episode contains several cultural references and Dr. Joyce Brothers guest stars as herself.

== Plot ==
While awaiting the arrival of the Springfield Nuclear Power Plant's union president to discuss the latest contract (unaware that the union president has been killed and buried in a football stadium), Mr. Burns reminisces about simpler times when his grandfather, the owner of an atom-smashing plant, would deal with his workers' complaints by immuring them in abandoned coke ovens. Burns decides to challenge the union's demands by revoking their dental plan.

Lisa is informed by her dentist that she needs braces. Marge is worried, but Homer tells her that the power plant's dental plan will cover the cost. At a union meeting, it is announced that the newest contract requires the workers to give up their dental plan in exchange for a free keg of beer at union meetings, which the workers delightedly accept. However, Homer realizes that giving up the dental plan would require him to pay for Lisa's braces, and reminds everyone how the dental plan has helped them. After encouragement from his co-workers, Homer is promptly elected the new union president.

Burns invites Homer to his office with the intent of bribing him, but Homer mistakes Burns' sly innuendos for sexual advances and walks out, despite being flattered and a little curious, leading Burns to erroneously believe that Homer is honest and incorruptible. Meanwhile, because the Simpsons have no dental insurance, Lisa is fitted with the cheapest (and ugliest) braces available, causing her self-esteem to plummet.

Homer is kidnapped by Burns' "hired goons" and taken to Burns' mansion. Burns gives Homer a tour of the mansion, including a room filled with 1000 monkeys writing on 1000 typewriters and "the largest TV in the free world", to try to schmooze him. But when the two men sit down to negotiate the contract, Homer suddenly needs to use the bathroom. Homer's delayed attempts to find the restroom leads Burns to inaccurately assume that Homer is a tough negotiator. At the next union meeting, Homer declares he is tired of meeting with Burns and attempts to resign. The union misinterprets his frustration, and the members decide to strike.

Burns attempts to break up the strike through several methods, including having a group of aged strikebreakers led by Grampa Simpson in Pinkerton uniforms but instead they begin telling a pointless story about onions. Burns and Smithers start to run the plant singlehandedly and commission robot workers, which turn against them.

After weeks of failed attempts to break up the strike, Burns deliberately causes a power outage throughout Springfield to break the union's spirit. However, the strikers do not lose hope and begin to sing a protest song written by Lisa. Burns meets with Homer and agrees to meet with the union's demands if Homer resigns as union president. As Homer loudly celebrates his freedom, Burns begins to realize that Homer is not the brilliant tactician he thought he was. With the Simpsons insured again, Lisa gets invisible, painless new braces. The dentist and the Simpsons laugh when it is revealed the room is being filled with nitrous oxide.

== Production ==
The idea for this episode came from Mike Reiss, who thought it would be funny if the plant went on strike. The writers of the episode, Jay Kogen and Wallace Wolodarsky, later added the dental plan aspect of the plot. During the production of this episode, an ABC camera crew was allowed into the rewrite room, which Al Jean says he regrets because they were working on stage direction, and they came off as not being very funny.

The producers originally asked Anthony Hopkins and Clint Eastwood to provide the voice of the dentist, Dr. Wolfe, but both declined the part. Anthony Perkins was eventually cast in the role, but died before his recording session. In the end, the role went to Simpsons regular Hank Azaria. The original choice for the guest panelist on Smartline (prior to the casting of Dr. Joyce Brothers) was O. J. Simpson, who turned the role down, much to the relief of the writers when Simpson was later tried for murder.

== Cultural references ==
Lisa's dream sequence, based on Yellow Submarine. Everything in the sequence had to be slightly changed for copyright reasons.

The title of the episode is an homage to Hubert Selby Jr.'s novel Last Exit to Brooklyn, one subplot of which involves the corruption and downfall of a union leader during a strike. The body of Chuckie Fitzhugh, Homer's predecessor as union president, is seen buried under a football field, an homage to the mystery surrounding the whereabouts of Jimmy Hoffa and his alleged burial at New Jersey's Giants Stadium. Mr. Burns' outfit in the flashback to his childhood is based on Buster Brown. Homer's fantasy of a life of organized crime is based on Don Fanucci's first appearance in The Godfather Part II, accepting donuts rather than a necklace and an orange.

Lisa's nitrous oxide-induced hallucination echoes the Beatles film Yellow Submarine, which Al Jean says had to be changed slightly for legal reasons. In the script, the name was changed to "purple submersible", and letters spelling "HATRED" are visible in the background; a contrast to the message of love popular in the 60s. Paul McCartney says "Look fellas, it's Lisa in the Sky!", and George Harrison notes "No diamonds though", a reference to the Beatles song "Lucy in the Sky with Diamonds". Ringo Starr says "Look out for the campy drawing of Queen Victoria!" The scene where Lisa sees a reflection of her monstrous braces, laughs maniacally and breaks the mirror is based on the scene from Tim Burton's Batman (1989) where Jack Napier discovers his transformation into the Joker.

When Homer is escorted by the hired goons into Burns' conservatory, a Burns-headed bird is sitting in the foreground. This is a reference to the shrieking cockatoo in Citizen Kane. The page Mr. Burns reads from the monkey's typewriter ("It was the best of times, it was the blurst of times!") is a reference to the first line of A Tale of Two Cities. After concluding her protest song, Lisa plays "Classical Gas" at Lenny's request. To reach the main power switch, Mr. Burns and Smithers walk down a long hall with multiple layers of security doors (a reference to the opening credits of Get Smart), then slide down twin fire poles and pass through a revolving door disguised as a bookcase (a reference to the original Batman TV series); the music accompanying the latter scene references Danny Elfman's theme from the Burton Batman. Before Mr. Burns shuts off the town's power in response to the strike, he says, "From Hell's heart I stab at thee", a reference to Captain Ahab's curse in Moby-Dick, one of Wolodarsky's favorite books. The workers' resistance to the power outage, and Mr. Burns's response, is a parody of Chuck Jones's How the Grinch Stole Christmas!. When Homer succeeds in getting the dental plan reinstated, he celebrates by spinning around on the floor and yelling "Woop-woop-woop" à la Curly Howard of The Three Stooges.

== Reception ==
In its original broadcast, "Last Exit to Springfield" finished 19th in ratings for the week of March 8–14, 1993, with a Nielsen rating of 13.7, equivalent to approximately 12.8 million viewing households. It was the highest-rated show on the Fox network that week.

The episode is generally ranked as being one of the best television episodes of all time; the BBC stated it is "frequently cited as the show's best-ever episode". An Entertainment Weekly article from January 2003 looking back at the top 25 episodes of the series named the episode as the show's greatest, calling it "virtually flawless, the product of a series at the height of its creative powers -- when the satire was savage and relevant" with "the stuff of syndication legend: Burns facing down 'brilliant' labor kingpin Homer Simpson; Homer Simpson facing down his own brain (DENTAL PLAN!/Lisa needs braces!); Grampa rattling on about wearing onions on his belt. Last Exit is a glorious symphony of the high and the low, of satirical shots at unions and sweet ruminations on the humiliations of adolescence (as evidenced by Lisa, who copes with a medieval mouth contraption)." In 2020, Al Jean acknowledged "Last Exit to Springfield" as an episode many consider a favorite.

In his book Planet Simpson Chris Turner names it the best episode of the series, saying "Episode 9F15 of The Simpsons should be taught in schools, in history, economics, social studies, literature and art class. It's flawless". He also called it "the funniest half-hour in TV history", and provided a full analysis of the episode, only criticizing the chalkboard and couch gags. He maintains that he chose the episode as best ever before Entertainment Weekly's list was published.

In 2003, to celebrate the show's 300th episode, USA Today published a top 10 chosen by the webmaster of The Simpsons Archive, which had this episode in first place. The BBC website says, "This fine episode contains several of our favourite sequences ... A classic, and the series' most marked expedition into the surreal - up to this point." Today, who listed the episode as their favorite, stated, "This is the episode that every self-respecting Simpsons geek must be able to recite verbatim."

Michael Moran of The Times ranked the episode as the sixth-best in the show's history. Screen Rant called it the best episode of the fourth season and the second greatest episode of The Simpsons (behind "Homer's Enemy").

Director Mark Kirkland considers the episode to be one of the most surreal episodes that he has worked on because it has a lot of story crammed into it, many parodies and several fantasy sequences, such as Homer's Godfather Part II-inspired meditation on organized crime. Al Jean has also called it one of the "craziest" episodes. Homer's line "Uh...yeah." (with the animation and line delivery implying Homer is lying) after being asked if he found the bathroom is one of Jay Kogen's favorite Simpsons jokes.

In The A.V. Club, Nathan Rabin writes that "'Last Exit To Springfield' is a popular candidate for the single greatest episode of The Simpsons, the greatest television show of all time... What makes this episode so special? What makes it the very best of the best? The answer, I think, comes down to joy. For an episode centering on emotionally charged, high-stakes labor negotiations and the horror of cut-rate dental care, 'Last Exit To Springfield' positively radiates an unlikely but pervasive sense of joy...Much of this joy is musical in nature. 'Last Exit To Springfield' is filled with both music and sequences blessed with a real sense of musicality", citing Lisa's Yellow Submarine-esque hallucination and Burns's dream of running the plant without workers. He also notes the episode's social commentary: "Underneath the richly merited jabs at labor’s propensity for corruption lies a real respect for labor’s capacity for good. In its own exquisitely cynical way, 'Last Exit To Springfield' offers a surprisingly nuanced depiction of the strengths and weaknesses of organized labor."

In 2024, Alan Sepinwall of Rolling Stone ranked "Last Exit to Springfield" as the second greatest episode of television of all time, behind only Breaking Bad’s "Ozymandias".

== Legacy ==
The episode has become study material for sociology courses at the University of California, Berkeley, where it is used to "examine issues of the production and reception of cultural objects, in this case, a cartoon show", and to figure out what it is "trying to tell audiences about aspects primarily of American society, and, to a lesser extent, about other societies."
