= Frink (programming language) =

- Paradigm: Multi-paradigm: object-oriented, imperative, functional,
- Designed by: Eliasen, Alan
- First appeared: 2001
- Filename extensions: .frink
- Website: frinklang.org

Major implementations
- Java virtual machine

Influenced by
- Java

Frink is a computer programming language. It is, according to creator of the language, "designed to make physical calculations simple, to help ensure that answers come out right, and to make a tool that's really useful in the real world. It tracks units of measure (feet, meters, kilograms, watts, etc.) through all calculations, allowing you to mix units of measure transparently, and helps you easily verify that your answers make sense."

== Features ==
- Units of measure for variables
- Interval arithmetic
- Anonymous functions

== Name ==
Frink was named after Professor Frink, recurring character in the animated television series The Simpsons.

== Example ==
fibonacciN[n] :=
{
   a = 0
   b = 1
   count = 0
   while count < n
   {
      [a,b] = [b, a + b]
      count = count + 1
   }
   return a
}
