= Pseudoideal =

In the theory of partially ordered sets, a pseudoideal is a subset characterized by a bounding operator LU.

== Basic definitions ==
LU(A) is the set of all lower bounds of the set of all upper bounds of the subset A of a partially ordered set.

A subset I of a partially ordered set (P, ≤) is a Doyle pseudoideal, if the following condition holds:

For every finite subset S of P that has a supremum in P, if $S\subseteq I$ then $\operatorname{LU}(S)\subseteq I$.

A subset I of a partially ordered set (P, ≤) is a pseudoideal, if the following condition holds:

For every subset S of P having at most two elements that has a supremum in P, if S $\subseteq$ I then LU(S) $\subseteq$ I.

== Remarks ==
1. Every Frink ideal I is a Doyle pseudoideal.
2. A subset I of a lattice (P, ≤) is a Doyle pseudoideal if and only if it is a lower set that is closed under finite joins (suprema).

== Related notions ==
- Frink ideal
