= Albert Frink =

American politician

Albert Frink (2006)

Albert A. Frink is the former Assistant Secretary for Manufacturing Services of U.S. Commerce Department, an office which was dubbed "manufacturing czar", by the press. Congress created the position in early 2004 (Consolidated Appropriations Act of 2004, P.L. 108–199, 118 Stat. 3, 65 (Jan. 23, 2004)) to ostensibly combat the loss of jobs in the manufacturing sector.

Prior his appointment as an Assistant Secretary in the Commerce Department, Frink was a California-based carpet manufacturer who co-founded Fabrica International.

In his first one and a half years in office, Frink was said to have met with the President only once. His post was criticized by Michigan legislators as "little more than window dressing for an administration that should be doing more to help American manufacturers who are being whipped by foreign competitors." U.S. Congressman Mike Rogers, (R-Michigan) said, "I'm not even sure if anybody is reading the papers (Frink) is shuffling. The position is ill-conceived. (The Bush administration) talks a great game, but they are moving in inches and we are losing in miles."
