= Aline Huke Frink =

American mathematician and academic (1904–2000)

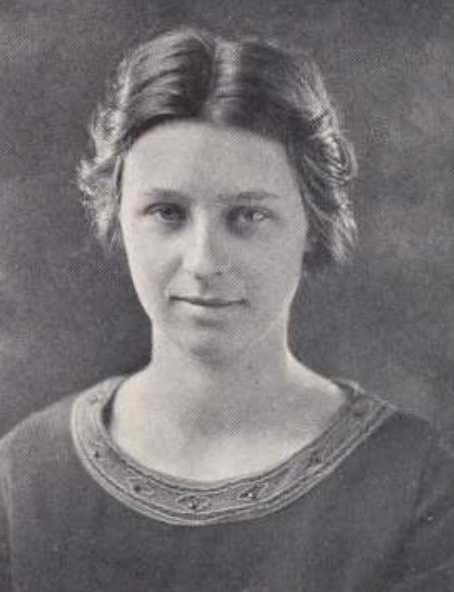
- Aline Huke, from the 1924 Mount Holyoke College yearbook
- Born: March 2, 1904; Torrington, Connecticut
- Died: March 14, 2000 (aged 96); Kennebunkport, Maine
- Occupation: Mathematician
- Spouse: Orrin Frink

Aline Huke Frink (March 2, 1904 – March 14, 2000) was an American mathematician, and a professor on the faculty of the Pennsylvania State University from 1930 to 1969.

== Early life and education ==
Aline Huke was born in Torrington, Connecticut and raised in Massachusetts, the daughter of Allen Johnson Huke and Mary Evelyn Feustel Huke. Her father was a businessman, and her mother was a schoolteacher.

Huke earned a bachelor's degree in mathematics from Mount Holyoke College in 1924. She trained as a teacher at the New York State Teachers' College in Albany, and completed a master's degree and doctorate at the University of Chicago. Her doctoral advisor was Gilbert Ames Bliss, who oversaw her 1930 dissertation, "An Historical and Critical Study of the Fundamental Lemma in the Calculus of Variations". She also studied with David Widder at Bryn Mawr College.

== Career ==
Frink taught at a high school in Cobleskill, New York from 1924 to 1926. She taught mathematics at Mount Holyoke College from 1929 to 1930, and at the Pennsylvania State University, part time after she married and full-time after 1947, two years after her last child was born. She held the rank of assistant professor until 1952, associate professor until 1962, and became professor emeritus when she retired in 1969.

In addition to her teaching, Frink translated a Russian-language mathematical text, Calculus of Variations by Naum Akhiezer, published in 1962. Her mathematical research was published in Bulletin of the American Mathematical Society. She was a charter member of the Women's Scientific Club at Penn State, along with Pauline Gracia Beery Mack, Mary Louisa Willard, and Teresa Cohen; the club became a chapter of Sigma Delta Epsilon (now Graduate Women in Science).

== Personal life ==
Aline Huke married fellow mathematician Orrin Frink in 1931. They had four children together. She was widowed when Orrin Frink died in 1988, and she died in 2000, in Kennebunkport, Maine, aged 96 years.
