= Professor Frink =

Fictional character from The Simpsons franchise

- The Simpsons character
- First appearance: "Old Money" (1991)
- Created by: Jay Kogen; Wallace Wolodarsky; Matt Groening
- Based on: Jerry Lewis as Julius Kelp
- Designed by: Matt Groening
- Voiced by: Hank Azaria

In-universe information
- Full name: John I.Q. Nerdelbaum Frink Jr.
- Gender: Male
- Occupation: Scientist, professor
- Family: John Frink Sr. (father)
- Children: John Frink III (son)

Professor John I.Q. Nerdelbaum Frink Jr. is a recurring character in the animated television series The Simpsons. He is voiced by Hank Azaria, and first appeared in the 1991 episode "Old Money". Frink is Springfield's nerdy scientist and professor and is extremely intelligent, though somewhat mad and socially inept. Frink often tries to use his bizarre inventions to aid the town in its crises but they usually only make things worse. His manner of speech, including the impulsive shouting of nonsensical words, has become his trademark.

Frink was originally depicted as an evil scientist in "Old Money", since he was trying to secure funding for a death ray. When Azaria ad-libbed a voice for the character, he did an impression of Jerry Lewis's Julius Kelp character from The Nutty Professor. The staff liked the voice and therefore changed Frink to be more like Julius Kelp, both in appearance and personality – he became more nerdy, and went from evil to just mad. Lewis later guest-starred on the show as Frink's father in the 2003 episode "Treehouse of Horror XIV".

The professor has received acclaim from critics, particularly for his bizarre inventions such as the hamburger earmuffs, and he has appeared on many reviewers' listings of their favorite supporting characters from The Simpsons. Frink has been featured in other media relating to the show, such as comics, video games, and The Simpsons Ride, a simulator ride at Universal Studios Florida and Universal Studios Hollywood. The character's popularity has led to him giving the name to the computer programming language Frink.

== Role in The Simpsons ==
John Frink is generally depicted as Springfield's stereotypical nerdy, mad, and socially inept scientist, inventor, and mathematician. He wears thick glasses, a white lab coat (which was green in earlier seasons), a blue bow-tie atop a white buttoned-up shirt, pink pants, and has buckteeth and center-parted hair. Frink is a college professor at Springfield Heights Institute of Technology and runs his own astronomical observatory. He has an IQ of 197 – it was 199 before he sustained a concussion during the collapse of Springfield's brief intellectual junta – and is a member of the Springfield chapter of Mensa. The episode Bart 'N' Frink indicates that Frink could be neurodiverse. Frink is generally very polite and friendly. He has a trademark mannerism of using Jerry Lewis-style gibberish when excited, such as "HOYVIN-GLAVIN!" and "FLAVIN" and impulsively shouting other words that have no relevance to the situation at hand. He also occasionally refers to the importance of remembering to "carry the one" in various mathematical calculations. When he rambles he often speaks incoherently in run-on sentences without pauses. Frink also has a tendency to over-complicate simple matters and use or invent scientific terminology while expressing various concepts, e.g. "Father and I got along like positrons and antineutrinos!" or "microcalifragilistics".

Frink often tries to use his mad and bizarre inventions to aid the town in its crises, but they usually do not work or only make things worse. Most of his inventions never function properly or are of no real use. He is the inventor of, among other things, a frog exaggerator (which grossly misrepresents the size of amphibians), automatic tapping shoes for tap dancing, the sarcasm detector, hamburger earmuffs, the 8-month-after pill, and a drilling machine that can cut through anything. Some of Frink's unsuccessful inventions include his small remote-controlled plane that carries babies as passengers (it crashed), the "Gamble-Tron 2000", a machine designed to predict pro football scores (after it predicts one team will win by 200 points, Frink physically attacks it on live television), and a burglar-proof house that sprouts legs and runs away from potential danger (the legs of which collapsed causing the house to crash to the ground and catch fire). As a scientist, Frink has discovered and cured "Frink's Disease" and discovered the element "Frinkonium". He has also mastered astrology to the point where he can use it to accurately predict the future, and has been shown to be capable of time travel.

The professor has a son who is seen in "Brother, Can You Spare Two Dimes?" during a convention for infant and toddler products as a pilot of a remote-controlled plane (he flies out the window of the building while in the plane and crashes), and in "I, (Annoyed Grunt)-Bot" at a robot battle (operating the robot). On the show, Frink has made mention of a wife, but there have also been jokes about him having had little contact with women in his life.

Frink often appears in the Treehouse of Horror Also, the Halloween episodes of The Simpsons, which are not accepted as canon and always take place outside the normal continuity of the show. Frink's bizarre inventions and understanding of advanced physics usually fit well into these supernatural plotlines. In "Treehouse of Horror VIII", Bart enters Frink's matter teleporter and – echoing the film The Fly – it results in an accidental mix between Bart's genes and the genes of a housefly that was also present in the transporter at the same time. In "Treehouse of Horror XIV", it is revealed that Frink had a father who was killed by a shark, whom he brings back to life in the episode by piecing together his body parts. Unfortunately, the man decides to steal body parts to improve himself after he is revived. In the latter episode, Frink is awarded a Nobel Prize.

== Character ==
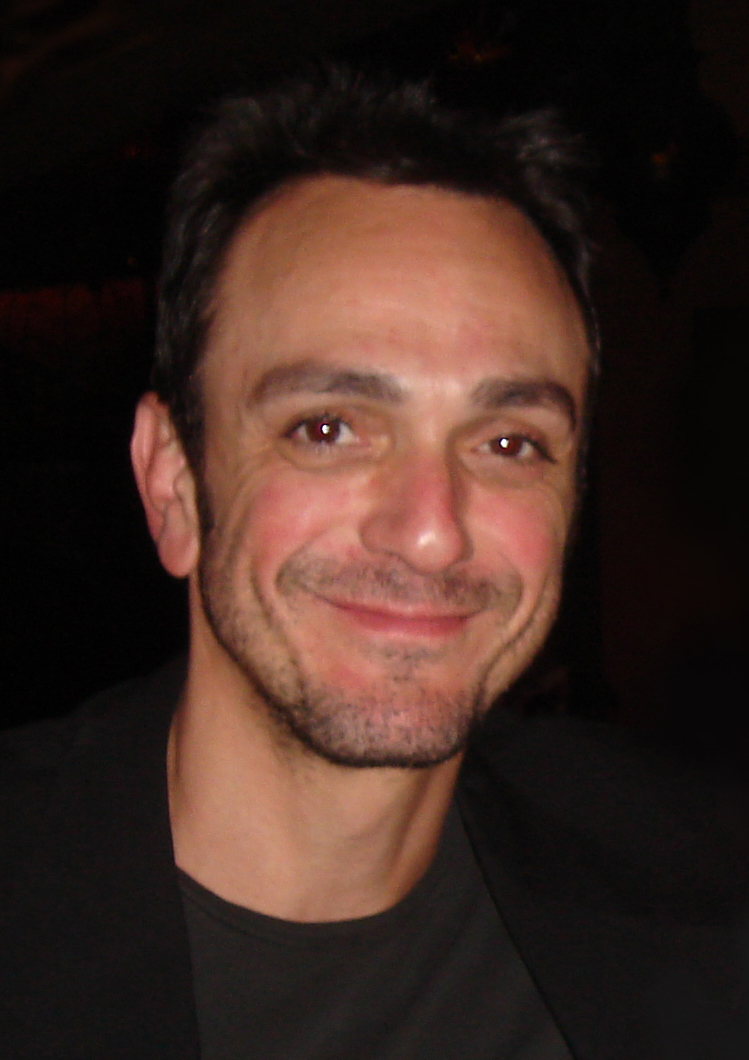
Hank Azaria voices Frink

Frink first appeared in the season two episode "Old Money" that aired on March 28, 1991. In that episode, Grampa Simpson inherits $106,000 from his girlfriend when she dies. He eventually decides to spend it on people who are in need of money and holds interviews. In one of these interviews, Frink introduces Grampa to his latest invention, the Death Ray, claiming that "it is just a prototype. With proper funding I'm confident this little baby could destroy an area the size of New York City!" Grampa responds with "But I want to help people, not kill 'em!", to which Frink replies "Oh. Well, to be honest, the ray only has evil applications. You know my wife will be happy, she's hated this whole Death Ray thing from day one."

In the original script, Frink appeared more evil. However, when cast member Hank Azaria ad-libbed a voice for Frink, he did an impression of Jerry Lewis's character Julius Kelp from the 1963 film The Nutty Professor, and the writing staff started making Frink more of a parody of that character. Julius Kelp is a nerdy, mad professor, albeit not evil, and is often unsuccessful with his experiments, so Frink became more like that as the show progressed. The Simpsons creator Matt Groening told TV Guide that "He was just written as a mad scientist character until Hank did the voice, and suddenly he became this nutty professor persona. What I love about Hank is that, you give him a single line – and most of these characters have very few lines – and he just brings it to life. Every time." Frink was originally animated without his buckteeth; they were added later on to make him look even more like Lewis's character. Writer Jay Kogen named the character after his friend and fellow television writer John Frink, who was later hired on The Simpsons. Frink's nonsensical utterances are written in the scripts as "Frink noise".

Azaria has voiced Frink ever since the first appearance of the professor. Of the many characters that Azaria voices, Frink is his favorite because he was a fan of Lewis in his younger years and he enjoys imitating the voice of the Nutty Professor. He has said that "once you start talking like [Julius Kelp] it's very hard to stop. On each take, I'll make it sillier, I always have. I'll add more and more stupid noises and sounds to it. If they let me keep going, it gets ridiculous."

As a homage to Lewis, Azaria conceived the idea of the "Treehouse of Horror XIV" segment in which Frink revives his dead father, with Lewis guest starring as the father. In a review of that episode, which aired around Halloween in 2003, Robert Bianco of USA Today wrote that it is hard to tell Frink and his father's voices apart: "Azaria voices Frink with such a spot-on Lewis imitation that it's sometimes hard to tell which one of the two nutty professors is talking." In addition, The Knoxville News-Sentinel's Terry Morrow commented that "to hear Lewis doing Azaria doing Lewis is a mind-bending gut buster, the kind of pay-off that die-hard Simpsons fans live for."

== Reception ==
Frink is a popular character on The Simpsons and he has received acclaim from critics. Mark Hughes Cobb of The Tuscaloosa News named him his favorite secondary character from the show. Fort Worth Star-Telegram's Robert Philpot called the professor one of the five best supporting characters on The Simpsons, writing that "Springfield's mad scientist is a triumph of style over substance, with Hank Azaria giving him a ripoff Jerry Lewis voice that reminds you why we once thought Lewis was funny." On their list of the top twenty-five peripheral Simpsons characters, IGN's Eric Goldman, Dan Iverson, and Brian Zoromski listed Frink at number fourteen, commenting that he fits nicely into the Simpsons universe "as the town's brilliant mad scientist." They highlighted a scene from the episode "The PTA Disbands", in which Frink becomes a kindergarten substitute teacher and keeps one of the children's toys to himself because the children "wouldn't enjoy it on as many levels" as he did. Nick Griffiths of Radio Times named Frink one of the best characters of the show, stating that he has "always loved Professor Frink", particularly because of his appearance, gibberish talking, and overuse of the word "the", and because of his inventions such as the matter teleporter that turns Bart into half-human half-fly. The Sydney Morning Herald's David Hollingworth profiled Frink in his list of "TV's great tech figures", writing that apart from being smart, the professor is best known for his "rather idiosyncratic speech patterns – hmmguyvin-whey-hey." Joe Rhodes of TV Guide listed the following as the professor's most memorable line: "Sorry I'm late. There was trouble at the lab with the running and the exploding and the crying when the monkeys stole the glasses off my head."

Several critics have commented on Frink's inventions. Patrick Goss of MSN's Tech & Gadgets wrote that "When it comes to gizmos, Frink is the king", and listed the Death Ray as one of the greatest gadgets featured in The Simpsons. Although he added that it "was not one of [Frink's] most successful", since it never received the funding it needed from Grampa. On the same list, Goss also featured Frink's automatic phone dialer, intra bovine ice-cream maker (an invention that is inserted into a cow and uses the four stomachs to mix the various ingredients), and hamburger earmuffs. In a profile about Frink, the publication UGO Networks wrote: "Where would the town be without your Jerry Lewis/Julius Kelp-inspired voice and antics? A lot safer most likely. Professor John Frink's inventions range from distracting to disruptive. Who can forget his hamburger earmuffs? Or his teleportation device, responsible for switching Bart Simpson's head with that of a housefly?" Howard Waldrop and Lawrence Person of Locus listed the scene in The Simpsons Movie that features Frink's drilling machine invention as one of the highlights of the film.

== Merchandising and legacy ==
Frink has appeared in various merchandise related to The Simpsons, including issues of Simpsons Comics, the simulator ride "The Simpsons Ride" at Universal Studios Florida and Universal Studios Hollywood, and video games such as The Simpsons Wrestling, The Simpsons: Road Rage, The Simpsons: Hit & Run, and The Simpsons Game. He has also been turned into a Halloween-inspired action figure that was packaged with Kids Meals at Burger King in October and November 2002. In addition, Frink was featured on the cover of the October 16, 2000 issue of TV Guide. In 2015, Lego released a second series for their Simpsons Lego Minifigures theme. The second series features Frink.

The professor has also affected real-life science. Frink, a computer programming language, was named after him. It is, according to creator of the language, "designed to make physical calculations simple, to help ensure that answers come out right, and to make a tool that's really useful in the real world. It tracks units of measure (feet, meters, kilograms, watts, etc.) through all calculations, allowing you to mix units of measure transparently, and helps you easily verify that your answers make sense."
