= Bart's Friend Falls in Love =

- The Simpsons episode
- Bart with Samantha and Milhouse
- Episode no.: Season 3 Episode 23
- Directed by: Jim Reardon
- Written by: Jay Kogen; Wallace Wolodarsky
- Production code: 8F22
- Original air date: May 7, 1992

Guest appearances
- Phil Hartman as Troy McClure; Kimmy Robertson as Samantha Stanky; Marcia Wallace as Edna Krabappel

Episode features
- Chalkboard gag: "I will not snap bras"
- Couch gag: The couch tips over backwards, sending the Simpsons through the wall.
- Commentary: Matt Groening; James L. Brooks; Al Jean; Mike Reiss; Julie Kavner; Nancy Cartwright; Yeardley Smith; Jay Kogen; Wallace Wolodarsky; Jim Reardon

Episode chronology
← Previous "The Otto Show"	Next → "Brother, Can You Spare Two Dimes?"
- The Simpsons season 3

"Bart's Friend Falls in Love" is the twenty-third episode of the third season of the American animated television series The Simpsons (and the de facto season finale). It originally aired on Fox in the United States on May 7, 1992.

The episode was written by Jay Kogen and Wallace Wolodarsky, and directed by Jim Reardon. American actress Kimmy Robertson guest starred in the episode as Samantha. The opening sequence of "Bart's Friend Falls in Love" is a parody of the film Raiders of the Lost Ark, while the closing sequence parodies the film Casablanca.

Since airing, the episode has received mostly positive reviews from television critics. It acquired a Nielsen rating of 12.4 and was the fourth highest-rated show on the Fox network the week it aired.

== Plot ==
While riding the bus to school, Milhouse shows Bart his new fortune-telling toy, a Magic 8 Ball. Bart asks the ball whether he and Milhouse will still be friends by the end of the day; the ball predicts they will not. The same day, a new student from Phoenix named Samantha Stanky joins the fourth grade class at Springfield Elementary School and Milhouse instantly falls in love with her. Milhouse and Samantha start a relationship. Rather than playing with Bart alone after school, Milhouse brings Samantha to Bart's tree house and they spend the entire time hugging and kissing, to Bart's dismay.

Meanwhile, Lisa worries that Homer's habit of eating fattening foods could cause his early death. At Lisa's suggestion, Marge orders a subliminal weight loss tape for Homer. The company is sold out of weight loss tapes and sends him a vocabulary-enhancer tape instead, which is sent to the Simpson family in the weight loss tape's usual packaging. Homer falls asleep while listening to the tape. When he wakes up, his vocabulary becomes flowery and erudite, but his eating habits remain unchanged. After two weeks of listening to the tapes, Homer weighs himself and discovers he has gained thirteen pounds. Homer discards the tape and his vocabulary quickly returns to normal.

Milhouse and Samantha spend all their free time together. Feeling jealous and excluded, Bart reveals their relationship to Samantha's father. As punishment, Mr. Stanky sends Samantha to Saint Sebastian's School for Wicked Girls, a convent school run by French-Canadian nuns. After seeing Milhouse heartbroken, Bart begins to feel guilty for his actions. Bart reveals to Milhouse that he told Samantha's father about Samantha and Milhouse's relationship; Milhouse becomes furious and physically fights Bart. After calming down, the boys visit Samantha at the convent school, where Bart apologizes to her. Samantha says she loves Saint Sebastian's but still has feelings for Milhouse. She gives him a goodbye kiss despite knowing that doing so is against the school's rules.

== Production and allusions ==
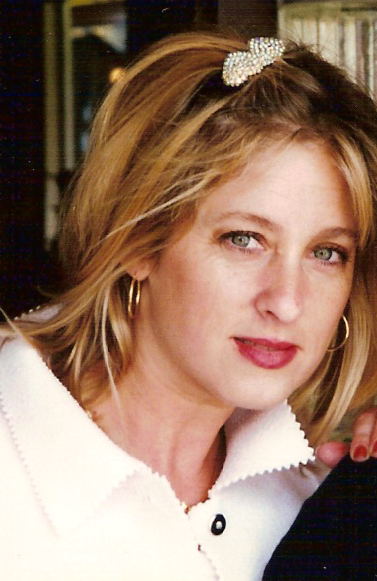
Kimmy Robertson guest starred in the episode.

The episode was written by Jay Kogen and Wallace Wolodarsky and directed by Jim Reardon. Kimmy Robertson guest starred as Samantha. She recorded all of her lines separately, instead of acting them out with the cast of in the recording studio as is usually done. Robertson said of the role: "I had no idea how popular I was going to be after I did that. All my friends think I'm the bee's knees now. I've made it." The physical appearance of Samantha is based on Kogen's niece, who is also named Samantha.

The opening sequence parodies that of Steven Spielberg's Raiders of the Lost Ark (1981). Bart, in the role of Indiana Jones, steals a penny jar (instead of a fertility idol) from Homer before heading to school on the bus. Homer, standing in for the boulder and the Hovitos tribe, angrily runs after Bart. While Bart runs through the house, Maggie fires suction darts instead of arrows. Bart is able to narrowly pass through the closing garage door and escape. As Bart steps onto the bus, Homer is seen the distance shouting after him. John Williams' theme from Raiders of the Lost Ark, "Raiders March", plays throughout the sequence. The producers had to contact Spielberg in order to clear the rights for the theme so they could use it in the episode. Paul Wee was the layout artist for the sequence. Julie Kavner praised it for focusing on the animation and having minimal dialogue.

Homer, his vocabulary newly enriched, refers to Bart's "Machiavellian countenance." When Samantha's father takes her away, Bart comforts Milhouse with some words from "In Memoriam" by Alfred, Lord Tennyson. The episode's closing sequence in which Bart and Milhouse visit Samantha at Saint Sebastian's is a reference to Casablanca (1942). One nun leads a group of children and sings "Dominique", a song by The Singing Nun. Cast member Maggie Roswell provided the voice of the nun, but did she not know the actual French lyrics to the song so she made up her own. The writers had difficulties coming up with an idea for the end of the episode. Executive producer James L. Brooks pitched the idea of Samantha getting shipped off to a Catholic school with "fun nuns" like The Singing Nun. Lisa reads a magazine with the headline "The Year 2525 - were Zager & Evans Right?", a reference to Zager and Evans and their song "In the Year 2525". Milhouse muses that his relationship with Samantha started like Romeo and Juliet but ended in tragedy, unaware that the play also ends in tragedy. Milhouse's original line in the scene was "It feel like somebody gave my heart a wedgie." Milhouse has a poster in his room featuring an X-wing from Star Wars.

== Reception ==
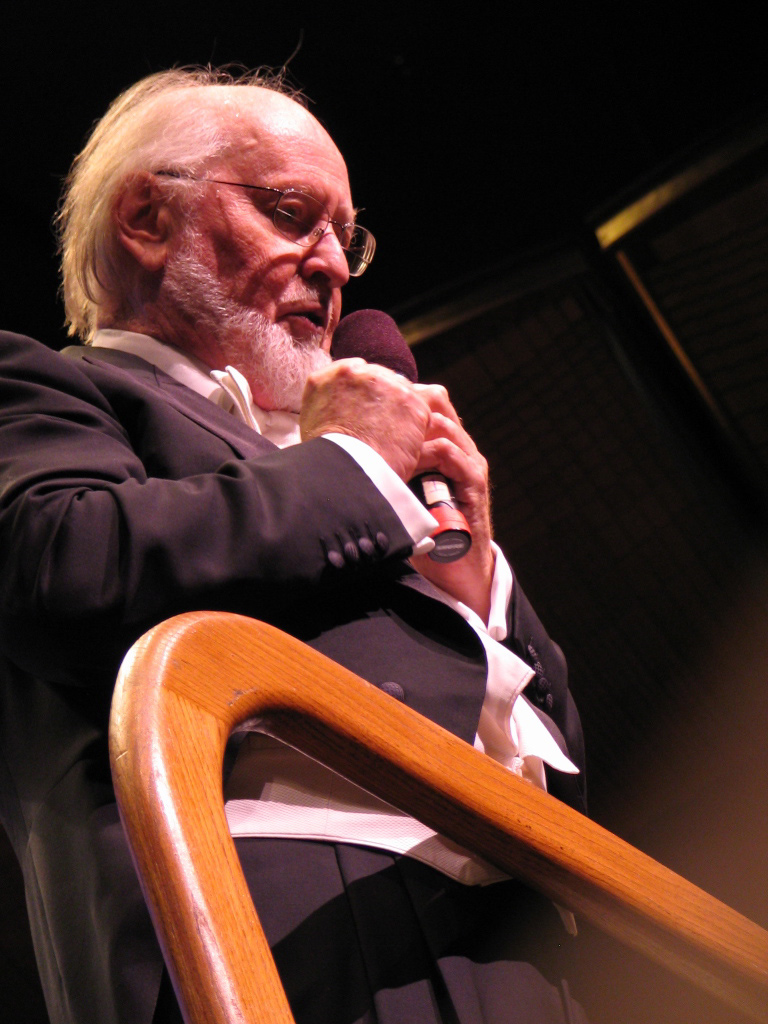
John Williams' theme from Raiders of the Lost Ark plays throughout the episode's praised Indiana Jones sequence.

In its original American broadcast, "Bart's Friend Falls in Love" finished 35th in the ratings for the week of May 4–10, 1992, with a Nielsen rating of 12.4, equivalent to approximately 11.4 million viewing households. It was the fourth highest-rated show on the Fox network that week, following Beverly Hills, 90210, In Living Color, and Married... with Children.

Since airing, the episode has received mostly positive reviews from television critics. The authors of the book I Can't Believe It's a Bigger and Better Updated Unofficial Simpsons Guide, Gary Russell and Gareth Roberts, said the episode was "a fitting end to a season that had seen The Simpsons consolidate its success and become even more daring and intelligent."

DVD Movie Guide's Colin Jacobson said that "from the ingenious and hilarious Raiders of the Lost Ark parody at the show’s start, 'Bart's Friend Falls in Love' is a keeper. It actually develops the characters and gets into pre-teen emotions but never becomes sappy. The 'B'-plot in which Lisa tries to get Homer to lose weight provides terrific laughs as well." Nate Meyers of Digitally Obsessed gave the episode a 4.5 out of 5 rating and commented that "It's tough to view Milhouse in a romantic relationship, especially since the most recent seasons have made a point of hinting at Milhouse being gay. Still, the love triangle makes for some interesting drama and the script's observations about childhood infatuations are right on point."

Bill Gibron of DVD Verdict, however, thought the plot seemed drawn out and "only Homer's eating disorder and subliminal tape attempts at weight loss have lasting appeal. Since the tape turns out to be a vocabulary builder, hearing Homer expound in flowery language is a real, rare treat." The Santa Fe New Mexican's Jeff Acker also preferred the subplot over the main plot.

The episode's Raiders of the Lost Ark parody was named the greatest film reference in the history of the show by Nathan Ditum of Total Film. Empire's Colin Kennedy also named it the best film parody in the show, calling it the series' "most famous opening sequence." He noted Homer played "both his roles – half-naked native; big fat boulder – with consummate aplomb."
