= Frink ideal =

In mathematics, a Frink ideal, introduced by Orrin Frink, is a certain kind of subset of a partially ordered set.

== Basic definitions ==
LU(A) is the set of all common lower bounds of the set of all common upper bounds of the subset A of a partially ordered set.

A subset I of a partially ordered set (P, ≤) is a Frink ideal, if the following condition holds:

For every finite subset S of I, we have LU(S) $\subseteq$ I.

A subset I of a partially ordered set (P, ≤) is a normal ideal or a cut if LU(I) $\subseteq$ I.

== Remarks ==
1. Every Frink ideal I is a lower set.
2. A subset I of a lattice (P, ≤) is a Frink ideal if and only if it is a lower set that is closed under finite joins (suprema).
3. Every normal ideal is a Frink ideal.

== Related notions ==
- pseudoideal
- Doyle pseudoideal
