= Orrin Frink =

American mathematician (1901–1988)

Orrin Frink Jr.
- Born: May 31, 1901; Brooklyn, New York
- Died: March 4, 1988 (aged 86); Kennebunkport, Maine
- Education: Columbia University
- Known for: Frink ideal Frink's Ratio Test
- Scientific career
- Fields: Mathematics
- Workplaces: Pennsylvania State University

Orrin Frink Jr. (31 May 1901 – 4 March 1988) was an American mathematician who introduced Frink ideals in 1954.

Frink earned a doctorate from Columbia University in 1926 or 1927 and worked on the faculty of Pennsylvania State University for 41 years, 11 of them as department chair. His time at Penn State was interrupted by service as assistant chief engineer at the Special Projects Laboratory at Wright-Patterson Air Force Base during World War II, and by two Fulbright fellowships to Dublin, Ireland in the 1960s.

Aline Huke Frink, his wife, was also a mathematician at Penn State. Their eldest son, also named Orrin Frink, became a professor of Slavic languages at Ohio University and Iowa State University. Their other children are Peter Hill Frink (1939–2021), who was an architect specializing in theaters and assembly places, John Allen Frink (b.1941), who was a senior consultant in IT for the DuPont Company, and Elizabeth Frink Boyer (b.1945), who was an art teacher and textile designer.

== Selected publications ==
- Frink, Orrin (1954). "Ideals in partially ordered sets". American Mathematical Monthly. 61 (4): 223–234. doi:10.2307/2306387. JSTOR 2306387. MR 0061575.
- Frink, Orrin (July 1933). "Jordan measure and Riemann integration". The Annals of Mathematics. 2. 34 (3): 518–526. doi:10.2307/1968175. ISSN 0003-486X. JSTOR 1968175.
- Frink, Orrin (1926), "A proof of Petersen's theorem", Annals of Mathematics, Second Series, 27 (4): 491–493, doi:10.2307/1967699, ISSN 0003-486X, JSTOR 1967699

== See also ==
- Petersen's theorem
