= Wallace Wolodarsky =

American screenwriter and film director

- Other name: Wally Wolodarsky
- Occupations: Screenwriter, actor, film director, producer
- Years active: 1989–present
- Spouse: Maya Forbes (m. 2004)
- Children: 3
- Relatives: China Forbes (sister-in-law)

Wallace Wolodarsky, also billed as Wally Wolodarsky, is an American screenwriter, television producer, film director, and actor known for being one of the writers for The Simpsons during the first four seasons with his writing partner Jay Kogen.

He is also known for his work on films like Monsters vs. Aliens, Infinitely Polar Bear, A Dog’s Purpose, and Trolls World Tour alongside his wife Maya Forbes.

== Career ==
Wolodarsky has starred in and directed several films. He has acted in multiple Wes Anderson films (Rushmore, The Darjeeling Limited, Fantastic Mr. Fox, The Grand Budapest Hotel and The French Dispatch) as well as several other films (A Dog's Purpose, Seeing Other People and The Polka King.)

== Personal life ==
Wolodarsky has three children. His wife, Maya Forbes, is the sister of singer China Forbes.

Wolodarsky is Jewish.

== Filmography ==
Title	Year	Credited as					Notes
Title	Year	Director	Writer	Producer	Actor	Role	Notes
1988–1990	The Tracey Ullman Show		Yes	Yes			
1990–1993	The Simpsons		Yes	Yes			
1991	Sibs		Yes				
1995	Coldblooded	Yes	Yes				
1998	Rushmore				Yes	Referee	
1999–2000	The Oblongs			Yes			
2001	The Kennedys			Yes			
2002	Sorority Boys	Yes					
2003	The Ortegas		Yes	Yes			
2004	Seeing Other People	Yes	Yes		Yes	Salesman	
2007	The Darjeeling Limited				Yes	Brendan	
2008	The Rocker		Yes				
2009	Monsters vs. Aliens		Yes				
2009	Fantastic Mr. Fox				Yes	Kylie (voice)	
2012	Diary of a Wimpy Kid: Dog Days		Yes				
2014	Infinitely Polar Bear			Yes	Yes	Peter	
2014	The Grand Budapest Hotel				Yes	M. Georges	
2016	American Crime Story		Yes				
2017	A Dog's Purpose		Yes				
2017	The Polka King		Yes	Yes	Yes	Vince	
2019	A Dog's Journey		Yes				
2020	Trolls World Tour		Yes				
2021	The French Dispatch				Yes	Cheery Writer	
2021	The Good House	Yes	Yes				

=== The Simpsons episodes ===
He co-wrote the following Simpsons episodes:

- "Homer's Odyssey"
- "Krusty Gets Busted"
- "Treehouse of Horror"
- "Bart the Daredevil"
- "Old Money"
- "Like Father, Like Clown"
- "Lisa the Greek"
- "Bart's Friend Falls in Love"
- "Treehouse of Horror III"
- "Last Exit to Springfield"

The recurring Simpsons character Otto Mann was modeled on Wolodarsky's appearance.
