= Jay Kogen =

American screenwriter

- Born: New York City, U.S.
- Occupations: Film writer, producer, actor, director
- Years active: 1988–present
- Children: 1
- Father: Arnie Kogen

Jay Kogen is an American comedy writer, producer, actor and director.

== Biography ==
Kogan was born in New York City to a Jewish family. His father is comedy writer Arnie Kogen. In 2001, Kogen had a son, Charlie, who is now a musician.

=== Career ===
Kogen co-wrote several episodes of The Tracey Ullman Show and The Simpsons along with former writing partner Wallace Wolodarsky; he served as a producer (alongside Wolodarsky) for the latter series from its second to its fourth season. Since then, he has written for several shows, including an Emmy Award winning stint at Frasier, Everybody Loves Raymond, George Lopez, and Malcolm in the Middle. Kogen also made an appearance in The Aristocrats. He was a consulting producer on The Class, co-writer of the Dave Foley/David Anthony Higgins 1997 film The Wrong Guy, as well as being a former stand-up comedian. He has also written, rewritten, punched up many films including Eddie Murphy's The Nutty Professor, the Austin Powers films, the Shrek films, The Cat in the Hat, Madagascar, Zombieland 2, and the Academy Award-nominated Kubo and the Two Strings.

In 2009, he started working on the Nickelodeon TV series The Troop. He is also the creator of Wendell & Vinnie.

In 2015, he became a writer & co-executive producer of Dan Schneider & Dana Olsen's live-action sitcom, Henry Danger.

In 2016, he became a writer, occasional director, and executive producer of School of Rock, a sitcom based on the 2003 film of the same name.

On April 15, 2019, Kogen joined other WGA writers in firing their agents as part of the WGA's stand against the ATA and the practice of packaging.

On December 9, 2020, Kogen and Ali Schouten signed on to develop an iCarly revival series. On February 25, 2021, it was reported that Kogen left the project due to "creative differences" with star Miranda Cosgrove.

== Notable filmography ==
The Simpsons

- "Homer's Odyssey"
- "Krusty Gets Busted"
- "Treehouse of Horror"
- "Bart the Daredevil"
- "Old Money"
- "Like Father, Like Clown"
- "Lisa the Greek"
- "Bart's Friend Falls in Love"
- "Treehouse of Horror III"
- "Last Exit to Springfield"

Frasier

- "My Fair Frasier"
- "Ain't Nobody's Business If I Do"
- "Sweet Dreams"
- "Frasier's Curse"
- "Merry Christmas, Mrs. Moskowitz"
- "IQ"
- "Something About Dr. Mary"
- "Morning Becomes Entertainment"

Malcolm in the Middle

- "Tiki Lounge"
- "College Recruiters"
- "Hal's Dentist"
