= Marge Simpson in: "Screaming Yellow Honkers" =

"Marge Simpson in: 'Screaming Yellow Honkers'"
- The Simpsons episode
- Episode no.: Season 10; Episode 15
- Directed by: Mark Kirkland
- Written by: David M. Stern
- Production code: AABF10
- Original air date: February 21, 1999

Guest appearances
- John Kassir as Possum; Hank Williams Jr. as Canyonero singer

Episode features
- Chalkboard gag: "Grammar is not a time of waste"
- Couch gag: The Simpsons sit on the couch as normal. A crash bar lowers onto their laps and the couch takes the family on a wild rollercoaster ride.
- Commentary: Mike Scully; George Meyer; Ian Maxtone-Graham; Ron Hauge; Matt Selman; Mike B. Anderson

Episode chronology
← Previous "I'm with Cupid"	Next → "Make Room for Lisa"
- The Simpsons season 10

"Marge Simpson in: 'Screaming Yellow Honkers'", or simply "Screaming Yellow Honkers", is the fifteenth episode of the tenth season of the American animated television series The Simpsons. It originally aired on Fox in the United States on February 21, 1999. After Homer purchases a Canyonero sports utility vehicle, he discovers he bought the model intended for women, so he gives the vehicle to Marge. Despite disliking it at first, Marge grows fond of it, and quickly develops road rage against other motorists. The episode was written by David M. Stern and directed by Mark Kirkland.

== Plot ==
The Simpson family attempts to leave Springfield Elementary after watching a poor talent show by the school's teachers. As they sit at the parking lot due to Marge's timid driving, Homer sees Krusty driving a Canyonero and buys one for himself. However, Lenny and Carl tell him he bought the "F-series", which is intended for women. Embarrassed, he gives the vehicle to Marge, who dislikes it at first due to its size and features, but soon grows fond of it and develops road rage. Later, Marge is given a traffic ticket by Chief Wiggum for cutting through a funeral procession and ordered to take a defensive driving course. While leaving the class, she accidentally drives the Canyonero into a prison, letting some inmates escape, and loses her license.

Later, Homer, Bart, and Lisa visit a zoo, where Homer sling-shots a rock at a lemur, causing a chain reaction that makes the rhinoceroses go berserk and escape. The police ask Marge to use her Canyonero to stop the wild animals, but she declines until she sees her family in danger. She succeeds in rounding up the animals and saving the children, but one escapes with Homer on its horn. She chases the angry rhino into a construction site and deliberately crashes the vehicle, making it explode. The rhino attempts to stamp out the fire, allowing zookeepers to capture it and Homer to escape.

== Production ==
The idea behind the episode came from a study performed that showed women had more cases of road rage than men. The names of the other car salesmen on the board in the car garage are friends of Mike Scully from high school. The road rage film which Chief Wiggum shows during the road rage class was originally titled "Screaming Yellow Honkers". The road rage film was originally to have been presented by Troy McClure, but voice actor Phil Hartman died the previous year. The group of people running out of the zoo, before Homer, Bart, and Lisa, are caricatures of Mike Scully, his wife, and his children, who are also seen running behind Kent Brockman's news report. The Fox executives were displeased with the positive references to NBC made near the end of the episode. As a compromise, the writers added in the sequence during the end credits where Homer reads a statement at gunpoint that disparages NBC and praises Fox (and briefly praises CBS, resulting in him being shot).

In an attempt to stop the rhinos, Homer shouts "Jumanji!", a reference to the film Jumanji. Marge mentions Dateline NBC and former anchor Stone Phillips. Ms. Krabappel does a balloon dance singing "Fever", a 1958 hit for Peggy Lee. The other teachers parody songs from Fame. Singer Courtney Love is advertised on a box of Wheaties breakfast cereal.

== Reception ==
In its original broadcast, "Marge Simpson in: 'Screaming Yellow Honkers'" finished 43rd in ratings for the week of February 15–21, 1999, with a Nielsen rating of 8.7, equivalent to approximately 8.6 million viewing households. It was the third highest-rated show on the Fox network that week, following Ally McBeal and The X-Files.

Peter Brown of If notes in his review of The Simpsons' tenth season that "Screaming Yellow Honkers", alongside "Lard of the Dance", "Wild Barts Can't Be Broken", and "Homer Simpson in: 'Kidney Trouble'", was one of "the best episodes of the season".

The authors of the book I Can't Believe It's a Bigger and Better Updated Unofficial Simpsons Guide, Warren Martyn and Adrian Wood, wrote in their review of the episode: "very clever, very dry humour and showcasing the last person you might expect to suffer road rage. Some lovely moments (Marge losing patience with Agnes and Kearney is great), especially her drive across the cornfield. Sadly the Canyonero doesn't survive the experience of this episode, which would have been nice, if only to see Marge regularly at the wheel rather than Homer."

== See also ==
- Screaming Yellow Zonkers
