= Wild Barts Can't Be Broken =

- The Simpsons episode
- Episode no.: Season 10; Episode 11
- Directed by: Mark Ervin
- Written by: Larry Doyle
- Production code: AABF07
- Original air date: January 17, 1999

Guest appearance
- Cyndi Lauper as herself

Episode features
- Chalkboard gag: "Sherri does not "got back""
- Couch gag: A parody of a scene from the film Dr. Strangelove; the Simpsons (wearing cowboy hats) straddle the couch as it drops from a bomb bay door towards the ground.
- Commentary: Matt Groening; Mike Scully; George Meyer; Larry Doyle; Matt Selman; Tom Martin

Episode chronology
← Previous "Viva Ned Flanders"	Next → "Sunday, Cruddy Sunday"
- The Simpsons season 10

"Wild Barts Can't Be Broken" is the eleventh episode of the tenth season of the American animated television series The Simpsons. It originally aired on Fox in the United States on January 17, 1999. When Homer, Barney, Lenny, and Carl drunkenly vandalize Springfield Elementary School, it is blamed on the children of Springfield, prompting Chief Wiggum to impose a curfew. The children respond by setting up a pirate radio show in which they reveal the embarrassing secrets of Springfield's adults. The episode was written by Larry Doyle and directed by Mark Ervin. The concept behind the episode originates from show producer Mike Scully always wanting to do an episode where the children would be subject to a curfew.

The episode received an 8.9 Nielsen rating, and mostly positive reviews from critics.

== Plot ==
The Simpsons are at Springfield War Memorial Stadium, watching a Springfield Isotopes baseball game. After Cyndi Lauper's rendition of the national anthem, the crowd all begins to leave before the announcer reminds them that there's still a ball game to be played. After the first pitch, Homer becomes disappointed by the poor performance of the Isotopes and goes to wait in the car. The game picks up as the Isotopes and the rival team are deadlocked into a tight game. Six months later, he enters Moe's Tavern and is informed by Lenny and Carl that the Isotopes are in the playoffs, and have been playing well (although a sniper's deadly rampage at the All-Star Game is credited with much of their success). Homer jumps on the Isotopes bandwagon as they win the pennant. To celebrate, Homer, Lenny, Carl, and Barney go on a drunken rampage and end up vandalizing Springfield Elementary School.

The next morning, Homer discovers his now badly damaged car, oblivious that he and his friends were responsible. Chief Wiggum jumps to the conclusion that the vandalism at the school is the work of "no good punk kids", and immediately enforces a curfew on all of Springfield's children, prohibiting them from being on the local streets after dark. The kids do not react well to the new rules, and soon rally together to break curfew so they can see a 1950s drive-in horror movie which they saw advertised on television, called The Bloodening. While at the movie, the screening is suddenly stopped by Chief Wiggum. As punishment for breaking curfew, the children must clean a police billboard with Chief Wiggum on it.

To get even with their parents and the other adults, the children set up a late night pirate radio show called We Know All Your Secrets, in which they expose the adults' secrets all through Springfield, similar to the children in the movie. They are tracked down at the billboard by Professor Frink, resulting in a musical confrontation, between the kids and adults of Springfield. However, this in turn rouses the ire of Grampa Simpson and the other senior citizens trying to get some sleep. To get even with both groups, they take the measure of voting a brand new curfew, sending everyone under the age of seventy to their own homes before sunset. It is passed by a single vote, due to Homer refusing to cast a ballot, claiming "it wouldn't have made a difference". Elderly residents including Abe, Jasper, Old Jewish Man and others have a great time in the undisturbed dusk streets of Springfield.

== Production ==
Mike Scully wanted to do an episode where the children of Springfield would be subject to a curfew. He came up with the idea to do a Kids vs. Adults episode, where the children would be blamed for something the adults have done. The name of the baseball announcer, Denis Conroy, was used because that is the name of writer Larry Doyle's uncle. Dan Castellaneta ad libbed Homer singing "Hitler is a jerk, Mussolini...." It was added in to the episode only for the purpose of filling time. The Chief Wiggum billboard sketch was inspired by Beaver Cleaver getting stuck in a soup bowl billboard during the "In the Soup" episode of Leave It to Beaver. The music playing when the kids secretly leave their houses to see the movie was written by composer Alf Clausen.

== Cultural references ==
- The episode's title is a reference to the movie Wild Hearts Can't Be Broken.
- The movie The Bloodening is a parody of the 1960 film Village of the Damned.
- The sequence showing the children taking the equipment to build their radio transmitter is a recreation of a sequence from the short comedy films Our Gang, featuring similar music and a dog, with Milhouse dressed like Our Gang character Alfalfa.
- The review Marge reads of Talk to the Hand – "The writing snaps, crackles and pops" – was how Variety reviewed the sitcom Just Shoot Me! when it first aired in 1997.
- The set of "Don't Go There" is similar to Central Perk on Friends.
- The musical argument between kids, adults and seniors is a parody of the song "Kids" from the musical Bye Bye Birdie.
- When Lisa is flipping through the radio channels, President Franklin D. Roosevelt's Infamy Speech can be heard.
- In the Springfield Elementary School shower-room Homer, Barney, Lenny, and Carl sing a medley of Queen songs consisting of "We Are the Champions" and "We Will Rock You".
- When Cyndi Lauper sings "The Star-Spangled Banner" it is to the tune of her hit song "Girls Just Want to Have Fun".
- In one scene, when Chief Wiggum orders the children to go inside, he says, "Achtung, babies!" This is a reference to the album Achtung Baby by Irish rock band U2, who guest starred in "Trash of the Titans" the previous season.
- When Bart calls Milhouse about a commercial for the movie, Milhouse is watching The Teletubbies.

== Reception ==
"Wild Barts Can't Be Broken" finished tied for 40th in the weekly ratings for the week of January 11–17, 1999 with a Nielsen rating of 8.9.

In his review of The Simpsons' tenth season, James Plath of Dvdtown.com noted "Wild Barts Can't Be Broken" as "pretty decent".

Peter Brown of If regards "Lard of the Dance", "Marge Simpson in: 'Screaming Yellow Honkers'", "Wild Barts Can't Be Broken", and "Homer Simpson in: 'Kidney Trouble'" as "some of the best episodes of the season".

The authors of the book I Can't Believe It's a Bigger and Better Updated Unofficial Simpsons Guide, Warren Martyn and Adrian Wood, wrote that the episode was "a curiously unmemorable episode with a good chunk in the middle. Neither the opening with The Isotopes nor the finale with the rather dire song help this one at all, and frankly, if it wasn't for the superb parody of Village of the Damned, and the kids' revenge by revealing their family's secrets, it'd sink without trace."

In 2007, Simon Crerar of The Times listed Lauper's performance as one of the thirty-three funniest cameos in the history of the show.
