= The Wizard of Evergreen Terrace =

- The Simpsons episode
- Homer's obsession with Thomas Edison causes boredom for everyone around him. This scenario was inspired by Dan Greaney's personal experiences.
- Episode no.: Season 10; Episode 2
- Directed by: Mark Kirkland
- Written by: John Swartzwelder
- Production code: 5F21
- Original air date: September 20, 1998

Guest appearance
- William Daniels as KITT

Episode features
- Chalkboard gag: "I will not file frivolous lawsuits"
- Couch gag: The living room is set up like a crowded movie theater and the family pushes their way through the audience to the couch.
- Commentary: Matt Groening; Mike Scully; George Meyer; Ron Hauge; Dan Greaney; Julie Thacker; Mark Kirkland

Episode chronology
← Previous "Lard of the Dance"	Next → "Bart the Mother"
- The Simpsons season 10

"The Wizard of Evergreen Terrace" is the second episode of the tenth season of the American animated television series The Simpsons. It originally aired on Fox in the United States on September 20, 1998, and was seen in around 7.95 million households during the broadcast. In the episode, Homer, realizing his life is half-over and that he has not accomplished anything, begins to admire Thomas Edison and decides to create inventions to follow in Edison's footsteps and make his life worthwhile.

The idea behind "The Wizard of Evergreen Terrace" came from Dan Greaney, who assigned John Swartzwelder to write the episode. While directing the episode, Mark Kirkland visited the Edison Museum in Llewellyn Park, New Jersey, to receive inspiration for several scenes in the episode that take place in this museum. The episode's title is a play on Edison's nickname, the Wizard of Menlo Park. William Daniels made a guest appearance in the episode as the character KITT from the television series Knight Rider. In general, "The Wizard of Evergreen Terrace" received positive reviews from television critics, with many singling it out as a strong beginning to a season.

== Plot ==
Homer becomes depressed after learning he has lived past the halfway point of the average life expectancy for men, without accomplishing anything worthwhile. The Simpson family try to cheer him up by showing him a film of his accomplishments and a special appearance by the character KITT from the Knight Rider television series that Homer is a fan of. When the film projector stops working, Lisa mentions that Thomas Edison invented the projector and many other inventions. Homer decides to learn more about Edison and eventually idolizes him. In an attempt to follow his footsteps, he quits his job at the Springfield Nuclear Power Plant to become an inventor.

The family disapproves of his first few inventions, including a make-up shotgun, electric hammer, an "everything's OK" alarm that cannot be turned off but easily breaks, and reclining chair with a built-in toilet, making Homer more depressed. However, they like one particular invention, a chair with two hinged legs on the back, making it impossible to tip over backwards. Homer is encouraged until he notices his poster of Edison shows him sitting in the same type of chair. Bart points out that the chair is not featured on a list of Edison's inventions, meaning he never told anyone of this invention.

Homer and Bart travel to the Edison Museum in Llewellyn Park, New Jersey, with his electric hammer to destroy the chair, but Homer notices a poster of Edison comparing himself to Leonardo da Vinci, much like how Homer compared himself to Edison. Feeling a renewed connection to Edison, he decides not to destroy the chair.

Homer and Bart return to Springfield, unaware they left Homer's electric hammer at the museum. Later when the family watches the news on television, Kent Brockman announces that the chair and electric hammer have been discovered at the Edison Museum and are expected to generate millions for Edison's already wealthy heirs, to the ire of the family.

== Production ==
"The Wizard of Evergreen Terrace" was written by John Swartzwelder, who had a deal with the producers of the show to write five scripts for season ten. Although he was the one who wrote the episode, Dan Greaney was the one who came up with the idea for it. Greaney based Homer's intense obsession with Edison on the fact that when he himself would have an obsession with something in life, he would badger and bore people with details of it. "Homer's relationship to Thomas Edison's achievements is a version of my own experience of trying to communicate the experience of things you love by driving people crazy", Greaney said in a DVD audio commentary for the episode. The untippable chair was also an idea of Greaney's; while working on the episode, he was leaning back in his chair and fell backwards. He casually said it would be great if there were legs on the back of the chair and someone in the writing room said that would be a great invention for Homer. Soon after coming up with the story, Greaney told it to Swartzwelder so that he could turn it into a script. Greaney said "it couldn't in my best dreams have turned out as good as it did if I had written it".

Mark Kirkland was the director of "The Wizard of Evergreen Terrace". He recalls that when he attended the table-read for the episode, the staff thought it was "hilarious" and they could tell it was "going to be a good one". It was the last episode to be produced during the season nine production run and because it takes several months to complete the production of a single episode, it had to air as a hold-over in the upcoming tenth season. It was decided that "The Wizard of Evergreen Terrace" would be the premiere episode of season ten. As a result, the annual premiere party was held at the Museum of Science and Technology in Los Angeles – it was a tradition for the premiere party to be related to the premiere episode.

Kirkland cites his assistant director Matthew Nastuk as a big influence on the episode. He became heavily involved with the animation because he had grown up in New Jersey, where the Thomas Edison National Historical Park that Homer and Bart visit is located. To help make the museum look as authentic as possible, Kirkland and Nastuk visited it and took a large number of photographs that they brought back to the animation studio. At one point in the episode, Homer writes complex math formulas on a chalkboard. The producers wanted them to be actual formulas, so writer David X. Cohen got in contact with a professor at the Massachusetts Institute of Technology who were able to provide them.

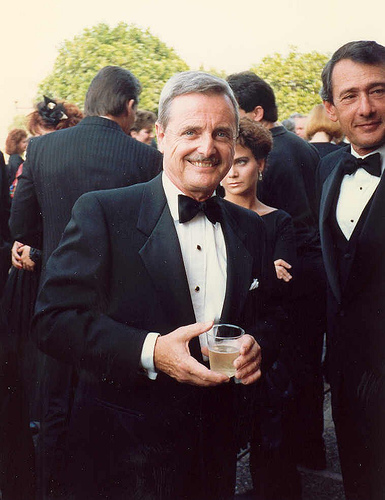
William Daniels guest starred as KITT, a character from Knight Rider, in the episode

The episode features a guest appearance by actor William Daniels as KITT, a character from the Knight Rider television series of which Homer is a fan. KITT is an artificially intelligent electronic computer module installed in an automobile. In the episode, after failing to cheer Homer up with a film reel of his life, the family shows him a video featuring KITT. The automobile, seen driving in the desert, tells Homer the following: "Hello Homer. It's me, KITT, from TV's Knight Rider. Your family has asked me to invite you to a very special ..."; the film reel breaks just before KITT finishes his sentence. This of course leads to Homer becoming even more depressed. Daniels' appearance in "The Wizard of Evergreen Terrace" was the first and only time that he voiced KITT outside of Knight Rider and the film Knight Rider 2000. He recalls that "when I told my son in New York that I was going to be on The Simpsons, I think that was the first time that he was really impressed with what I was doing! The Simpsons is a great show and I'm glad they thought of KITT in one of their jokes."

== Reception ==
In its original American broadcast, "The Wizard of Evergreen Terrace" finished 25th in the ratings for the week of September 14–20, 1998, with a Nielsen rating of 8.0, equivalent to approximately 7.95 million viewing households. It tied with Beverly Hills, 90210 and Home Improvement for the 25th place. The episode was the third highest-rated show (tied with Beverly Hills, 90210) on the Fox network that week, following Ally McBeal and Party of Five.

"The Wizard of Evergreen Terrace" has received generally positive reviews from critics. James Plath of DVD Town thought it had strong writing. The authors of the book I Can't Believe It's a Bigger and Better Updated Unofficial Simpsons Guide, Warren Martyn and Adrian Wood, called it "a terrific episode, full of wit and sly digs at our expectations of Homer's abilities. The fact that he invents things that other people find useful (and steal the credit for) is both amusing and a little sad. Poor Homer." Writing for DVD Movie Guide, Colin Jacobson commented that "though 'Wizard' borders on 'Homer's wacky scheme' territory, his attempts to come up with something significant offer amusement. At no point does 'Wizard' threaten to become a particularly strong episode, but it entertains to a reasonable degree. I do like the 'Everything's Okay Alarm' and the makeup gun, though."

Although "Lard of the Dance" aired as a teaser episode a month earlier, "The Wizard of Evergreen Terrace" was the official season premiere of The Simpsons' tenth season. Don Aucoin of The Boston Globe wrote that "It is gratifying to report that, based on the season premiere, The Simpsons promises to remain the most reliable half-hour of laughs on television." Similarly, David Bianculli of The New York Daily News reported that "The Simpsons is one series that, year after year, remains fresh and funny and lively and surprising. Based on tonight's season premiere, that amazing streak is in no danger of ending." Lauri Githens of The Buffalo News gave the episode a 5/5 rating, commenting that it shows that "This cynical, bleak yet somehow still hopeful comedy is nowhere near midlife crisis with Season No. 10. It's still fall-down funny. Thank God." She cited Homer's line to Marge as he and Bart leave for the Edison Museum, "I'm-taking-Bart-over-state-lines-back-soon-I-have-your-wallet-bye!", as the best line of the episode.

The Lexington Herald-Leader's Heather Svokos was not as pleased. She stated that "As always, the show is better written than most anything on TV, but for a 10th season premiere, it didn't blow me out of the water." In addition, Phil Kloer of The Atlanta Journal gave the episode a C grade, calling it an "off episode". He commented that it "doesn't have the zing that most Simpsons episodes do". Kloer did, however, enjoy Homer's inventions such as the hamburger earmuffs and the make-up gun, and Homer's line to Marge before he shoots her with it: "Try to keep your nostrils closed." Marge's response after being shot, "Homer! You've got it set on whore!", was commended by The Gazette, DVD Verdict, and Ian Jane of DVD Talk, who called the scene the highlight of the episode.

In his 2015 book The Simpsons and their Mathematical Secrets, British particle physicist Dr. Simon Singh wrote that in the episode, Homer writes an equation on a chalkboard and "If you work it out, you get the mass of a Higgs boson that's only a bit larger than the nano-mass of a Higgs boson actually is. It's kind of amazing as Homer makes this prediction 14 years before it was discovered." He stated that the mathematical backgrounds of many of the show's writers made it the "most mathematical TV show on prime-time television in history", and it could "encourage and nourish" young people with an interest in mathematics.

== See also ==
- Thomas Edison in popular culture
