= Lisa Gets an "A" =

"Lisa Gets an 'A'"
- The Simpsons episode
- Lisa meets with Nelson Muntz to get the answers for the test.
- Episode no.: Season 10; Episode 7
- Directed by: Bob Anderson
- Written by: Ian Maxtone-Graham
- Production code: AABF03
- Original air date: November 22, 1998

Episode features
- Chalkboard gag: "I will not scream for ice cream"
- Couch gag: The family have hair transplants: Homer has Maggie's, Marge has Bart's, Bart has Lisa's, Lisa has Homer's, and Maggie has Marge's. Maggie falls off the couch due to the weight of Marge's hair.
- Commentary: Matt Groening; Mike Scully; George Meyer; Ian Maxtone-Graham; Ron Hauge; Yeardley Smith; Mike B. Anderson

Episode chronology
← Previous "D'oh-in' in the Wind"	Next → "Homer Simpson in: 'Kidney Trouble'"
- The Simpsons season 10

"Lisa Gets an 'A'" is the seventh episode of the tenth season of the American animated television series The Simpsons. It first aired on Fox in the United States on November 22, 1998. In the episode, Lisa cheats on a test for which she fails to study and receives an A+++ grade, but becomes guilt-ridden. In the subplot, Homer buys a lobster with the intention of fattening him up to eat, but he bonds with the crustacean and keeps him as a pet named Pinchy.

"Lisa Gets an 'A'" was directed by Bob Anderson, and although it was written by Ian Maxtone-Graham, neither the main storyline nor the subplot was conceived by him. The main storyline was instead pitched by former staff writer Ron Hauge, while Richard Appel, who also was a staff writer, had pitched the episode's subplot for a long time. The episode satirizes educational establishments, and features a parody of the video game series Crash Bandicoot.

In its original American broadcast, "Lisa Gets an 'A'" was seen by approximately 8 million viewers, and finished in 51st place in ratings the week it aired. Following its broadcast, a scene in the episode garnered criticism from the Catholic League, but the controversy went largely ignored by The Simpsons' staff. The episode received very positive reviews from critics, and is considered one of the best episodes of the season.

== Plot ==
After a long morning at church, the Simpsons go to the grocery store Eatie Gourmet's to take advantage of free samples in lieu of a Sunday brunch and Bart's suggestion that the family go Catholic so they can have "communion wafers and booze". At the store, Homer wants to buy a lobster, but since the larger ones are too expensive at $8 a pound, he decides to buy a baby lobster at $8 and fatten it up to 5lb ($40) for him to eat. Homer also tries to look for normal flavors of ice cream among the unusually named flavors at the "Ken & Harry's" factory plant, so he puts Lisa into the freezer to look for some in the back, which ultimately causes her to catch a cold.

Although Lisa hates the idea, Marge wants her to stay home from school for the next few days to recover from her cold. Lisa is derisive about playing one of Bart's video games in order to pass the time, but soon becomes addicted to it, and consequently ignores the homework on The Wind in the Willows that she is given by Ralph. She even fakes the perpetuation of her illness so that she can continue playing the game. When Marge finally compels her to return to school, Lisa realizes she is unprepared for a test on the book, having not read it. In a panic she visits Bart, who brings her to Nelson, from whom she gets the test answers. Miss Hoover grades the tests over lunch, and Lisa is awarded the rare grade of A+++. Meanwhile, Homer becomes attached to his lobster and names him Pinchy. When the time comes to cook Pinchy, Homer cannot bring himself to do it, and instead declares him a part of the family.

The family is extremely proud of Lisa's "achievement", although she is guilt-ridden at having cheated. The next day at school, Principal Skinner informs Lisa that her test grade has brought Springfield Elementary's GPA up to the state's minimum standard, and they now qualify for a basic assistance grant. Lisa admits that she cheated on the test, but Skinner and Superintendent Chalmers persuade her to keep it a secret so the school can keep the money. During the presentation, Lisa says that she understands how desperately the school needs the basic assistance grant money, but also says that the truth is more important, confessing that she cheated. The comptroller appears moved by her confession and decides the school may keep the money. After she leaves the auditorium, however, it is revealed that Skinner, Chalmers and Bart have fooled Lisa by staging a fake presentation before the real one as the "comptroller" was Otto in a rubber mask. When the real comptroller arrives, Bart manipulates a puppet of Lisa, allowing the school to keep the money. Meanwhile, Homer discovers that he has accidentally cooked Pinchy while giving him a hot bath. Later that night, a distraught yet satisfied Homer eats Pinchy, frequently alternating as he does so between continuing to tearfully mourn his death and gleefully finding his meat delicious.

== Production ==
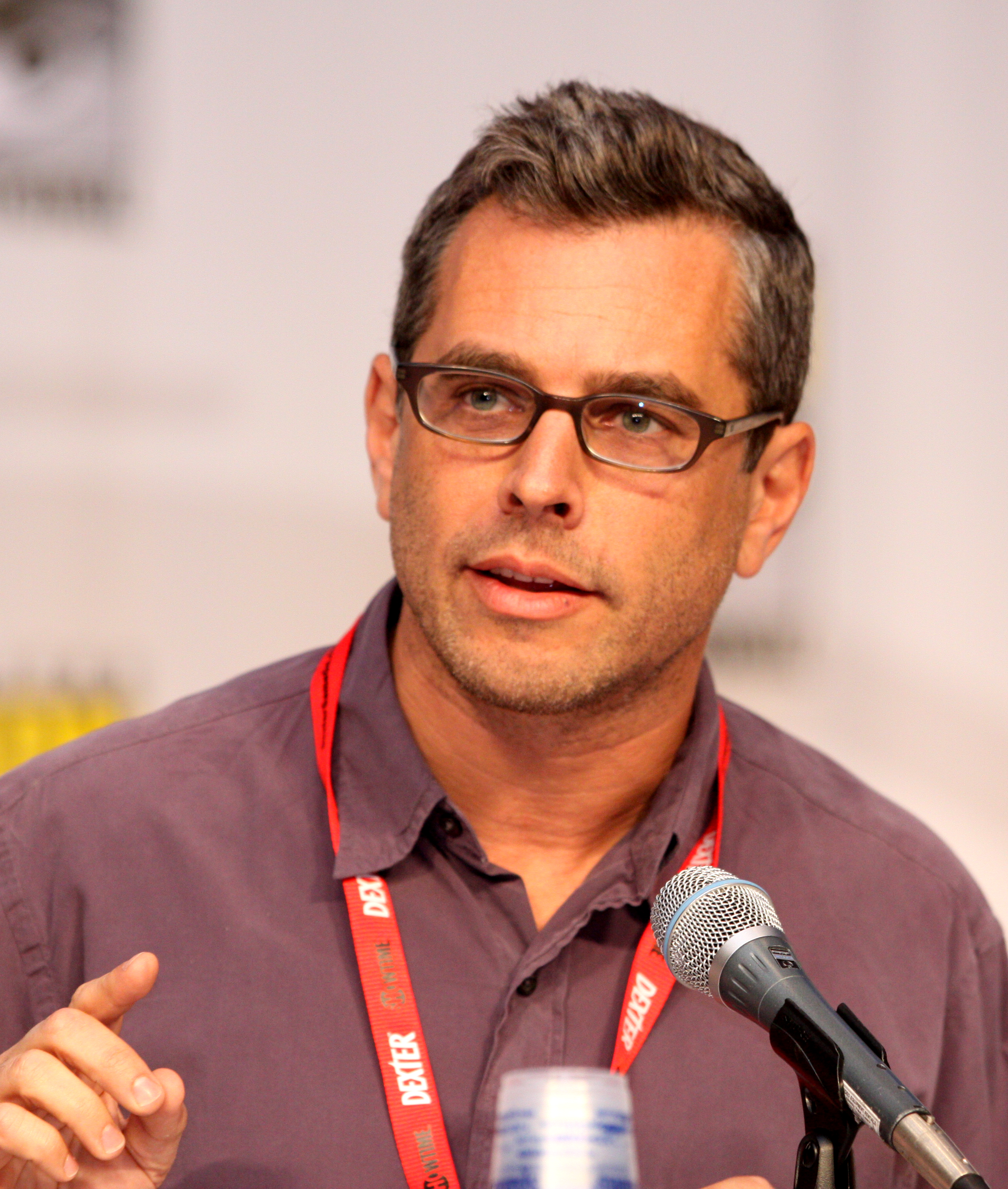
Richard Appel (pictured) pitched the episode's B-story.

"Lisa Gets an 'A'" was written by Ian Maxtone-Graham and directed by Bob Anderson. Although the episode was written by Maxtone-Graham, neither of the plots were conceived by him. The main plot involving Lisa was pitched by fellow Simpsons writer Ron Hauge, and the sub-plot involving Homer adopting a lobster was conceived by former staff writer Richard Appel. The writers found it difficult to "get the subplot go[ing]," and it took a long time to come up with the third act, according to Maxtone-Graham. The writers debated what name Homer would give his lobster. Hauge pitched that his name would be "Shelly", however they eventually settled on naming him "Pinchy". Hauge also pitched the name of the grocery store Eatie Gourmet's. At the end of the episode, when Homer is eating Pinchy, a lot of the dialogue was ad-libbed by Dan Castellaneta, who portrays Homer among other characters in the series. It took a long time for the writers to come up with an ending to the episode's main storyline. Eventually, they settled on an ending that parodied the 1973 caper film The Sting.

In real life, lobsters are black in color, turning red after being cooked. However, in "Lisa Gets an 'A'", Pinchy is red throughout the whole episode. The Dash Dingo video game was difficult to animate, according to Hauge, as the animators had to "make it look less than The Simpsons style". In order to achieve the desired effect, the animators decided to pixelate the video game. The episode features the second appearance of Gavin, who first appeared in the season seven episode "Marge Be Not Proud", and "Range Rover Mom", Gavin's mother. They were both voiced by Tress MacNeille. The false Comptroller Atkins was portrayed by series regular cast member Harry Shearer, while the real Atkins was voiced by Hank Azaria, who is also a regular cast member for the series. The name of the character was based on the name of Jacqueline Atkins, a writer's assistant on The Simpsons. The episode also features Marcia Wallace, Pamela Hayden, Maggie Roswell, Russi Taylor and Karl Wiedergott.

The episode satirizes the "skewed priorities" sometimes associated with educational establishments. Even though Principal Skinner knows that Lisa cheated on her test, he "looks the other way" so that the school meets the requirements for government funding. In the DVD commentary for the episode, the episodes showrunner Mike Scully opined that "there is a lot of truth in this story [...] There are certain requirements that the school has to meet in order to get state funding, and there are things that they'd rather look the other way on if it's gonna cost them money. This does really happen."

While staying home from school, Lisa plays a video game called Dash Dingo, a parody of the Crash Bandicoot video game series. In a scene in the episode, Lisa imagines that she will fail the test. She imagines that the president of Harvard University, voiced by Dan Castellaneta, will be disappointed in her and recommend her to Brown University, where Otto was apparently on faculty. The scene was conceived by Maxtone-Graham, whose alma mater was Brown University. He stated that all his friends from Brown and Harvard "loved" the joke. The liqueurs Kahlua and Drambuie are mentioned in the episode by Miss Hoover. With the government-funded grant money, Springfield Elementary are able to afford a Coleco, a 1980s home computer.

== Release and reception ==
=== Broadcast and controversy ===
In its original American broadcast on November 22, 1998, "Lisa Gets an 'A'" received an 8.0 rating, according to Nielsen Media Research, translating to approximately 8 million viewers. The episode finished in 51st place in the ratings for the week of November 16–22, 1998, tied with the ABC program Sabrina the Teenage Witch.

After its original broadcast, the episode garnered scrutiny from The Catholic League, an American Roman Catholic advocacy group. In a scene in the episode, the Simpsons are on their way home from a church service, and Bart says "I'm starving. Mom, can we go Catholic so we can get Communion wafers and booze?" To which Marge replies "No, no one is going Catholic. Three children is enough, thank you." In an issue of the Catholic League's monthly newspaper Catalyst, the organization wrote "The Fox animated TV show, The Simpsons, is loved by millions for its engaging characters. It was with regret, therefore, that we were forced to take issue with its November 22 episode ['Lisa Gets an "A"']." They added that William Anthony Donohue, the current president of the organization, had sent a letter to Fox, reading "Can you possibly explain why this dialogue was included in the show?" In response, Thomas Chavez, Fox's manager for broadcast standards and practices, wrote a "lengthy" letter, in part re-printed on the same issue of Catalyst. It read:

In your letter you questioned an exchange in dialogue between Bart and his mother, Marge. Because Bart is starving, he suggests they convert to Catholicism since he is aware communion wafers and wine are dispensed in the Catholic ceremony. Just like other children that are not knowledgeable, Bart sees the wafer merely as food and wine as a forbidden drink. Because many families wait to eat after they have attended Church, it is not atypical that a child would pose a question such as this unknowingly. The writers chose not to have Marge respond to Bart’s ridiculous desire to satisfy his hunger with the Sacrament but rather, elected to have Marge respond by stating why she would not be comfortable converting to Catholicism. Her views regarding birth control are obviously contrary to the Catholic Church's belief. While Marge's response may be perceived as short and curt, it also conveys the impression that one's choice of religion is based on more than the religion's rituals.

According to Mark I. Pinsky, author of The Gospel According to The Simpsons, the Catholic League was "not persuaded" by Chavez's letter, and stated that they "sarcastically" responded in Catalyst: "Now why didn't we think of that? Just goes to show how thoughtful the Hollywood gang really is." According to Pinsky, the controversy did not have any impact on the show and was "simply ignored" by The Simpsons' staff.

=== Home media and critical reception ===
On August 7, 2007, the episode was released as part of The Simpsons: The Complete Tenth Season DVD box set. Matt Groening, Mike Scully, George Meyer, Ian Maxtone-Graham, Ron Hauge, Yeardley Smith and Mike B. Anderson participated in the DVD's audio commentary of the episode.

Following its home video release, "Lisa Gets an 'A'" received very positive reviews from critics.

Warren Martyn and Adrian Wood of I Can't Believe It's a Bigger and Better Updated Unofficial Simpsons Guide described it as "A fabulously defining moment in Lisa's life, showing what happens if you let your guard slip." They continued by writing "What makes this work even more is the false ending which shows that everyone in Springfield is as adept at predicting Lisa's morality as the viewers are." They concluded their review by calling it "An absolutely inspired piece of comedy."

Colin Jacobson of DVD Movie Guide wrote that he "[took] great delight in the way this episode skewers the skewed priorities of the educational establishment." He added that "Lisa acts like her usual prissy self, but that factor acts to allow the show to succeed." He concluded by writing that the episode "connects to real emotions pretty well and offers some funny moments."

Digital Entertainment New's Jake McNeill described it as one of the season's best episodes, giving particular praise to its subplot, which he called "great".

James Plath of DVD Town wrote that "the real fun in this episode comes from Homer's attachment to a lobster he brings home."
