= Make Room for Lisa =

- The Simpsons episode
- Episode no.: Season 10; Episode 16
- Directed by: Matthew Nastuk
- Written by: Brian Scully
- Production code: AABF12
- Original air date: February 28, 1999

Episode features
- Chalkboard gag: "I do not have diplomatic immunity" (recycled from "Marge in Chains")
- Couch gag: Firemen are using the couch as a net but Homer misses and hits the floor.
- Commentary: Mike Scully; George Meyer; Ian Maxtone-Graham; Ron Hauge; Matt Selman; Mike B. Anderson

Episode chronology
← Previous "Marge Simpson in: 'Screaming Yellow Honkers'"	Next → "Maximum Homerdrive"
- The Simpsons season 10

"Make Room for Lisa" is the sixteenth episode of the tenth season of the American animated television series The Simpsons. It first aired on Fox in the United States on February 28, 1999. The main plot has Homer and Lisa embark on a spiritual journey via a sensory deprivation tank.

"Make Room for Lisa" was written by Brian Scully and was the first full The Simpsons episode Matthew Nastuk directed, having received a co-director credit for "D'oh-in' in the Wind", for which he directed one scene. The subplot, which involves Marge eavesdropping on phone calls using a baby monitor, was inspired by former showrunners Bill Oakley and Josh Weinstein, who also listened to private phone calls with a monitor. The episode contains references to the American sitcom All in the Family, and advises children to be accepting of their parents.

In its original broadcast, the episode was seen by approximately 7.6 million viewers, finishing in 52nd place in the ratings the week it aired.

Following the home video release of The Simpsons - The Complete Tenth Season, "Make Room for Lisa" received mixed reviews from critics.

== Plot ==
Homer participates in a drinking contest and wins the trophy and title of "Sir Drinks-A-Lot". Having promised to spend one Saturday a month with the children, he takes Bart and Lisa to Lisa's choice of outing: the traveling Smithsonian Institution exhibition sponsored by cell phone company "OmniTouch". Homer ruins one of the exhibits, the Bill of Rights, by reading it with chocolate-covered hands. As he is unable to pay the $10,000 repair, bill OmniTouch installs a cellular transmitter on the roof of his house, with the control equipment in Lisa's room. Lisa moves into Bart's room, where she cannot concentrate on her homework.

Lisa develops stomach aches and visits Dr. Hibbert, who suggests either "harsh antacids" or herbal tea. Homer scoffs at the tea Lisa wants and demands the antacids. Lisa snaps at her father for belittling everything she believes in. To placate her, Homer takes her to a New Age store where they try out sensory deprivation tanks and each experience their own spiritual journey. Lisa sees herself from the perspective of figures in her life, eventually realizing that Homer loves her enough to take her to events that he does not personally like just to make her happy. Meanwhile, repo men take away the tank that Homer is in. Homer's journey becomes a real one, as his tank falls out of the back of the van, is mistaken for a coffin and buried, only for the tank to fall into a pipe from which it is washed up onto the beach, where Chief Wiggum finds it and returns it to the store. Lisa decides to do something together they both enjoy: a demolition derby.

Meanwhile, Marge becomes obsessed with eavesdropping on private calls picked up from the cellular tower on Maggie's baby monitor. Bart and Milhouse prank Marge by making her think an escaped convict is breaking into the house. Marge smashes the baby monitor on Milhouse's head and knocks him out. She reluctantly agrees when Bart says the prank was fair punishment for eavesdropping.

== Production ==
"Make Room for Lisa" was written by Brian Scully and was the first full episode Matthew Nastuk directed for The Simpsons. Nastuk had previously received a credit for "D'oh-in' in the Wind", for which he directed one scene. "Make Room for Lisa" was also the second episode about Homer and Lisa that Scully wrote for the series, the first one being "Lost Our Lisa" from the previous season. "Make Room for Lisa" was first broadcast on the Fox network in the United States on February 28, 1999. When writing the episode, the Simpsons writing staff debated what to do with Lisa after her room had been rebuilt. Brian Scully eventually pitched that Lisa and Bart would have to share a room together, as it would, according to staff writer Matt Selman, comment on the feeling of having to share a room with a sibling, and how it would "incredibly suck." The writers then wrote the episode around that plot point.

Near the beginning of the episode, Homer takes part in, and wins, KBBL's drinking contest. In the next scene, Homer is seen fallen out of his car, and waken up by Marge. The scene was inspired by Scully's brother Mike Scully, who, during a date, saw his date's father "drunk and passed out" on her lawn, in the same pose as Homer in the scene. The episode's subplot revolves around Marge, who listens to phone calls by picking up their frequencies with a baby monitor. The storyline was based on former Simpsons showrunners Bill Oakley and Josh Weinstein, who also used to listen to other people's phone calls through airwave signals. At one point in the episode, Marge overhears a conversation between Moe Szyslak and Lenny Leonard. Originally, the conversation would be between two women, but the writers thought it would be "too cliche" to show women gossiping, and changed it to Moe and Lenny instead. While inside the isolation tank, Homer gets bored and starts singing "Witch Doctor" by Armenian-American singer Ross Bagdasarian Sr. aka David Seville. According to Mike Scully, the Simpsons staff had to pay the song's record company $100 000 for the rights to use the tune in the episode. The episode features a "prototype" of what would become the recurring character Lindsey Naegle, who is voiced by American actress Tress MacNeille. The character would make her official debut later in the season in the episode "They Saved Lisa's Brain".

== Themes and cultural references ==
Throughout the series, Homer and Lisa's relationship is problematic, as Homer often struggles to understand Lisa, who in many ways is a little girl but who is also smarter than him. Karma Waltonen and Denise Du Vernay analyzed "Make Room for Lisa" in their book The Simpsons in the classroom: Embiggening the Learning Experience with the Wisdom of Springfield. They wrote that in the episode, Homer and Lisa's relationship is badly damaged after Homer allows Lisa's room to be turned into a cell phone tower. When the two enter sensory-deprivation tanks, Lisa has several hallucinations, including one in which she becomes Homer. This experience shows Lisa how she appears from Homer's point of view, and makes her realize that her treatment of Homer is hurtful, as he often participates in activities with her that he does not enjoy. The episode ends with Homer and Lisa watching a demolition derby, which Lisa enjoys because she is spending time with Homer. The episode advises children to be accepting of their parents, who "do the best [they] can" to raise them.

The American sitcom All in the Family has provided much influence for the comedy in The Simpsons, as John Alberti writes in his book Leaving Springfield: the Simpsons and the possibility of oppositional culture. He wrote that the series influence on The Simpsons is "acknowledged quite openly in the program itself," and used a scene in "Make Room for Lisa" as an example. The scene shows Homer, Bart and Lisa visiting the Smithsonian Exhibition, where a jacket worn by Fonzie, a character from another 70's series, Happy Days, receives more attention from visitors than the Bill of Rights. It does however catch the attention of Homer, who picks it up and reads it while sitting in a wing chair owned by Archie Bunker, a character from All in the Family. Homer is accosted by two security guards, who assault him using, according to Alberti, "the kind of language we have learned to accept from the erstwhile occupant of that chair [Bunker]." Homer and the two guards have the following exchange:

SECURITY OFFICER #1: Get out of Archie Bunker's chair. Now!

HOMER: Relax! I'm just boning up on the old Constitution.

SECURITY OFFICER #2: Oh! You're going to regret that, Pinko! [Raises his billy club to strike Homer] [Homer cowers, holding the Bill of Rights in front of his face]

SECURITY OFFICER #1: I'm so sick of people hiding behind the Bill of Rights!

SECURITY OFFICER #2: Look! He got chocolate on it!

HOMER: I didn't mean to! Look! [Homer licks the chocolate off; unfortunately, some of the ink comes off as well]

SECURITY OFFICER #1: Mn-hn. You just licked off the part that forbids cruel and unusual punishment.

SECURITY OFFICER #2 [pounding brass knuckles into his palm]: Heh heh heh. Beautiful.

Alberti opines that, rather than denying All in the Family's influence on The Simpsons, the series writers "mockingly embrace it" by having Homer visually likened to Bunker as he sits on his chair. Alberti also noted that one of the security officer's use of the word "pinko", a term used for a person who is regarded as sympathetic towards communism, is "ironic" as it was used by Bunker, whose chair Homer is sitting in. When the other officer complains about citizens "hiding behind the Bill of Rights", Homer shields himself from the officers blows with the actual manuscript, making the officer's previous statement literal.

In the opening scene, Homer overhears a radio broadcast explaining the year 1939 and comes to the mistaken assumption that he somehow traveled back in time, the song "Sing, Sing, Sing" by Benny Goodman is playing. Lenny and Carl bring him back with "The Safety Dance". When Homer is in the Isolation tank, he is singing "Witch Doctor".

== Reception ==
In its original American broadcast on February 28, 1999, "Make Room for Lisa" received a 7.6 rating, according to Nielsen Media Research, translating to approximately 7.6 million viewers. The episode finished in 52nd place in the ratings for the week of February 22–28, 1999, tied with a new episode of the CBS documentary and news program 48 Hours. On August 7, 2007, the episode was released as part of The Simpsons - The Complete Tenth Season DVD box set. Mike Scully, George Meyer, Ian Maxtone-Graham, Ron Hauge, Matt Selman and Mike B. Anderson participated in the DVD's audio commentary of the episode.

Following its home video release, "Make Room for Lisa" received mixed reviews from critics.

Gary Russell and Gareth Roberts, of I Can't Believe It's a Bigger and Better Updated Unofficial Simpsons Guide described the episode as having "two distinct halves, although the second far outweighs the first." They added that Homer's adventure in the sensory deprivation tank was "inspired," in its "almost Keystone Kop humour as he gets from point A to point B and so on, finally getting back to point A none the wiser." They concluded their review by calling the episode "classic."

Colin Jacobson of DVD Movie Guide gave the episode a mixed review, and described its main plot as "feeling a bit stale." He felt that there were already several episodes dedicated to Homer and Lisa's problematic relationship, and that "Make Room for Lisa" "doesn't do much to expand that theme." However, he described the episode's subplot as "interesting," and wrote "Marge's fascination with intercepted cell phone calls amuses." He concluded his review by describing the episode as "pretty average."

DVD Town's James Plath gave the episode a mixed review as well, calling it "okay."
