= The Old Man and the "C" Student =

"The Old Man and the 'C' Student"
- The Simpsons episode
- Episode no.: Season 10; Episode 20
- Directed by: Mark Kirkland
- Written by: Julie Thacker
- Production code: AABF16
- Original air date: April 25, 1999

Guest appearances
- Jack LaLanne as himself; NRBQ sings "Can't Buy Me Love"

Episode features
- Chalkboard gag: "Loose teeth don't need my help"
- Couch gag: The Simpsons find the rest of the cast in their living room watching TV.
- Commentary: Matt Groening; Mike Scully; George Meyer; Julie Thacker; Ron Hauge; Nancy Cartwright; Mark Kirkland

Episode chronology
← Previous "Mom and Pop Art"	Next → "Monty Can't Buy Me Love"
- The Simpsons season 10

"The Old Man and the 'C' Student" is the twentieth episode of the tenth season of the American animated television series The Simpsons. It first aired on Fox in the United States on April 25, 1999.

In the episode, after offending the Olympic committee during their visit to Springfield Elementary, the school's students are committed to 20 hours of community service. Bart, along with his sister Lisa, is put in charge of Springfield's retirement home, where Bart notices the doldrums that the old people go through every day. Meanwhile, Bart and Lisa's father Homer tries to sell springs.

"The Old Man and the 'C' Student" was directed by Mark Kirkland and was the first episode Julie Thacker wrote for The Simpsons. While Bart's storyline was pitched by Thacker, the B-story, involving Homer, was conceived by Thacker's husband Mike Scully, who also was an executive producer and the showrunner for the episode. Jack Lalanne guest-starred as himself in the episode. On its original broadcast, "The Old Man and the 'C' Student" was seen by approximately 6.9 million viewers. Following the release of The Simpsons: The Complete Tenth Season, the episode received mostly positive reviews from critics.

== Plot ==
When Lisa writes a letter to the International Olympic Committee, they decide that Springfield will be home to the next Olympics. To honor the Olympics, there is a contest for the games' mascot. Homer creates a character names Springy the Springfield Spring, which is chosen as the winner, and the town prepares for an inspection by the IOC. The visit goes well until Bart performs a stand-up comedy routine that insults the delegation members; in response, the IOC decides to hold the Olympics in Shelbyville rather than Springfield, and Superintendent Chalmers blames Principal Skinner for letting Bart perform. In order to avoid losing his job, Skinner makes every one of the school's students do community service.

After sending Milhouse to collect medical waste on the beach and leaving Martin to start a basketball program between inter-city gangs, Skinner has Bart assigned to work at the Springfield Retirement Castle, where Lisa also works voluntarily. Bart is dismayed at how little the seniors are allowed to do.

Meanwhile, Homer gets 1,000 springs he intended to sell as Olympic mascot toys. He uses various get-rich-quick schemes to sell off the mascots, but fails miserably and gets abused due to Springfield's hatred of Bart's comedy routine and everyone including Marge being annoyed by the springs. Ultimately, he is forced to flush the springs down the toilet. At the time Lisa leads the seniors in "imagination time", but when she departs, Bart makes the seniors escape to get a taste of freedom. Bart takes the seniors on a trip on the town and on a boat ride, and Lisa is initially shocked to see these things happen, but nevertheless, she is quite impressed by what Bart does for the seniors. The seniors have fun until their boat crashes into Mr. Burns' schooner. The boat begins to sink and the seniors turn on Bart, but Grampa defends him, saying Bart gave them the best fun they have had in twenty years. However, the springs that Homer flushed down the toilet save them, causing the boat to bounce up at the surface long enough for the Coast Guard to rescue everyone. Bart finishes his community service time, but decides to help the seniors still enjoy themselves and spend more time with Grampa.

== Production ==
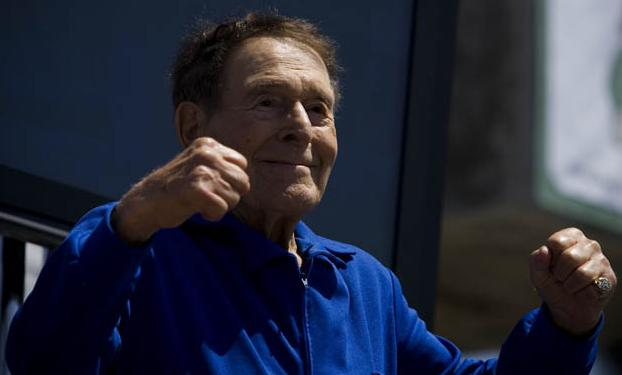
Fitness expert Jack Lalanne guest-starred as himself in the episode.

"The Old Man and the 'C' Student" was directed by Mark Kirkland and was the first episode Julie Thacker wrote for The Simpsons. It was first broadcast on the Fox network in the United States on April 25, 1999. The episode's plot was based on a "disastrous" school program, in which students had to participate in community service in order to be allowed to advance to the next grade. Thacker, whose oldest daughter was a student at the school, was signed up to do community service at an old folks home in the town they lived in. It became the inspiration for the episode's A-story, while the B-story, which involved Homer selling springs, was conceived by Thacker's husband Mike Scully, an executive producer and the showrunner for the episode.

In a scene in the episode, Lenny gets one of Homer's springs stuck in his eye. Lenny's eye injuries have since become a running gag, and "The Old Man and the 'C' Student" "started the trend", according to Thacker. The "clunky, Up With People-type" dance that the students perform for the Olympic jury was partly demonstrated during the animatic by Simpsons writer George Meyer. When Meyer later watched the episode, he found out, to his "horror", that he had been given a choreographer credit at the end of the episode. The episode features American fitness expert Jack Lalanne as himself. In the DVD commentary for the episode, Scully stated that Lalanne was "very funny" and that he "gave a great performance". Lalanne's lines were recorded separately from the series main cast members.

== Cultural references ==
The episode title is a reference to the 1952 novel and 1958 film The Old Man and the Sea. In the beginning of the episode, a sign reading "International Olympic Committee" can be seen. The logo below the text parodies the logo of the real International Olympic Committee. Because they did not want to "upset" the committee, the Simpsons staff slightly altered the logo by changing the colors and not making the rings interlock. In a conversation with Marge, Lisa mentions the rest of her classmates wrote letters to the Backstreet Boys. In a scene in the episode, the old people can be seen watching an edited and over-dubbed version of the 1939 film Gone With the Wind. The nurse that works in the old folks home is based on Nurse Ratched from the 1975 American drama film One Flew Over the Cuckoo's Nest. The film is referenced again in a scene where Bart takes the old folks on a boat trip and a scene where a Native American chief in the old folk's home throws a sink through a window, and jumps out, mirroring the last scene in the film. The character then returns, and hands Lisa a pamphlet that reads "Prop 217". The pamphlet is a reference to Proposition 217, a proposition that allowed Native Americans to operate casinos in certain states. It is also a reference to the day Scully and Thacker met, which was on February 17.

The scene in which Smithers is drawing a portrait of Mr Burns is a reference to the 1997 drama film Titanic. The scene where the old people celebrate their escape from the home is a reference to a sequence from The Beatles' 1964 film A Hard Day's Night. Both are set to the group's song "Can't Buy Me Love", although in the episode the song is a cover performed by NRBQ. During the end credits, an album cover reading "A Bart Day's Night", a reference to The Beatles' album A Hard Day's Night, the film's soundtrack, is shown. "Can't Buy Me Love" also plays over the end credits.

== Reception ==
In its original American broadcast on April 25, 1999, "The Old Man and the 'C' Student" received a 6.9 rating, according to Nielsen Media Research, translating to approximately 6.9 million viewers. The episode finished in 41st place in the ratings for the week of April 19–25, 1999. On August 7, 2007, the episode was released as part of The Simpsons - The Complete Tenth Season DVD box set. Matt Groening, Mike Scully, George Meyer, Julie Thacker, Ron Hauge, Nancy Cartwright and Mark Kirkland participated in the DVD's audio commentary of the episode.

Following its home video release, "The Old Man and the 'C' Student" received mostly positive reviews from critics. Aaron Roxby of Collider gave it a positive review, calling it one the season's best episodes. He wrote "The Simpsons has always been great about addressing/mocking the way that our culture treats the elderly." He added that Lenny's eye injury gave the episode "Extra points". Gary Russell and Gareth Roberts, of I Can't Believe It's a Bigger and Better Updated Unofficial Simpsons Guide described the episode as "A marvellous feel-good story" and "Very sweet, very endearing." They added that the "stereotyped Olympic Committee debate" at the beginning of the episode is "marvellous", and concluded by describing the episode as "terrific".

Colin Jacobson of DVD Movie Guide was positive as well, writing "I gotta admit I like Springy, the Olympic mascot, and the spring-related aspects of the show entertain." He added that the story involving Bart "offer more than a few good moments," and concluded by writing "Though the episode never quite excels, it’s pretty solid." James Plath of DVD Town called it an "okay" episode. Jake McNeill of Digital Entertainment News described the episode as "not-so-good," adding that "by this point, this show has expended just about every old folks joke there is." However, he also wrote that "'I want some taquitos' never grows old."
