= Monty Can't Buy Me Love =

- The Simpsons episode
- Episode no.: Season 10; Episode 21
- Directed by: Mark Ervin
- Written by: John Swartzwelder
- Production code: AABF17
- Original air date: May 2, 1999

Guest appearance
- Michael McKean as Jerry Rude

Episode features
- Chalkboard gag: "I have neither been there nor done that"
- Couch gag: The Simpsons rush in with the circus performers in a kickline to form part of a circus extravaganza.
- Commentary: Mike Scully; George Meyer; Ian Maxtone-Graham; Ron Hauge; Matt Selman

Episode chronology
← Previous "The Old Man and the 'C' Student"	Next → "They Saved Lisa's Brain"
- The Simpsons season 10

"Monty Can't Buy Me Love" is the twenty-first episode of the tenth season of the American animated television series The Simpsons. It first aired on Fox in the United States on May 2, 1999. In this episode, Mr. Burns is jealous of megastore owner Arthur Fortune, who is beloved by the people of Springfield. In order to win the people's love, Burns gathers the help of Homer Simpson, Professor Frink and Groundskeeper Willie to capture the Loch Ness monster.

The episode was written by John Swartzwelder and directed by Mark Ervin. The idea for the episode was pitched by the Simpsons writing staff, who wanted to make an episode in which Mr. Burns becomes a "thrillionaire", a millionaire who goes on thrilling adventures. Although it would originally be green, a mistake in the overseas animation led to the Loch Ness monster looking pink, a mistake that was ultimately too expensive to fix.

In its original broadcast, "Monty Can't Buy Me Love" was seen by approximately 7.26 million viewers, and finished in 43rd place in the ratings the week it aired. Following the release of The Simpsons: The Complete Tenth Season, the episode received mixed reviews from critics.

== Plot ==
Fretting the family is becoming lazy, Marge makes the family go for a walk, on which they arrive at the opening of a new Fortune Megastore (a parody of the real life Virgin Megastore). There, wealthy British entrepreneur Arthur Fortune (modelled on Richard Branson) easily charms the crowd and hands out dollar bills to his customers. This embarrasses the unpopular Mr. Burns, who asks Homer to help him be loved by all.

As his first activity, Mr. Burns has Homer throw silver dollars from the top of a tall building, which instead of winning him popularity, causes injuries and terrifies the crowds below. Next, he writes out a check and tells Homer to donate it to the Springfield Hospital, but Homer is mistakenly believed to be the donor and receives the credit. Mr. Burns appears on a radio show called Jerry Rude and the Bathroom Bunch but is mocked by the host. Feeling disappointed, Mr. Burns decides to go to Scotland to capture the legendary Loch Ness Monster with help from Homer, Professor Frink and Groundskeeper Willie. After little progress, Mr. Burns has the loch drained of water to expose the creature. After subduing the monster single-handed (although it is not shown, it is mentioned that the monster swallowed him), Mr. Burns has it sent to Springfield to be unveiled, where 'Nessie' turns out to be friendly and charms all the spectators.

However, during Nessie's unveiling, Mr. Burns is blinded by camera flashes and starts a fire after crashing into the crowd. Homer then cheers up Mr. Burns by pointing out that being loved means you have to be nice to people every day, but being hated means you do not have to do anything, which comforts Mr. Burns. In the end, Homer and Mr. Burns give Nessie a job at the 'Vegas Town Casino'. The end credits plays as normal, but in the Gracie Films logo, Lisa says, “Ooh, I hear this really sucks.”

== Production ==
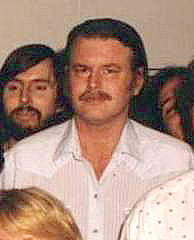
John Swartzwelder wrote the episode.

"Monty Can't Buy Me Love" was written by John Swartzwelder and directed by Mark Ervin. It originally aired on the Fox network in the United States on May 2, 1999. The inspiration for the episode came from the concept of "thrillionaires", a term the Simpsons writers found in an issue of The Economist to describe millionaires who "do really incredible stunts" and "go on amazing adventures". The episode's third act went through several incarnations, and the writers had a lot of ideas about what Burns should do once he has captured the Loch Ness monster. Eventually, the staff settled on the act's current iteration, which was conceived by Simpsons writer George Meyer. According to current showrunner Al Jean, the color of the Loch Ness monster would originally be green, but when the overseas animation was completed, the Loch Ness monster had a "kind of pinkish" color. Because it would be too expensive to re-color all the cels in which the monster appears, the staff decided to air the episode as it was, even though the monster was in the wrong color. Inside the Fortune Megastore, Simpsons staff writer Ian Maxtone-Graham can be seen.

The episode features American comedian and composer Michael McKean as Jerry Rude, a parody on the radio personality Howard Stern. Scully stated that McKean was "very funny" and that his Stern impression was "dead on the money". The Simpsons staff originally asked Stern if he wanted to guest-star in the episode, but he declined. Actor and producer Kevin Costner was portrayed by series regular cast member Hank Azaria, who voices Moe Szyslak among other characters in the series. Azaria also played Arthur Fortune, a character based on British business magnate Richard Branson. In the DVD commentary for the episode, Scully stated that Branson would have been a "great guest[-actor]" in the episode. The episode also features Groundskeeper Willie's father, even though Willie in an earlier episode said that he was killed for stealing a pig.

== Cultural references ==
In the beginning of the episode, the Simpsons watch a television program called Cash in Your Legacy, which is a parody of the PBS program Antiques Roadshow. Arthur Fortune is a parody of Richard Branson and Fortune Megastore is a reference to Branson's international record shop chain Virgin Megastores. On the cover of Billionaire Beat, a magazine that Burns reads in the episode, business magnates Bill Gates and Rupert Murdoch can be seen. In a scene in the episode, Burns assumes that Don McNeill and his Breakfast Club is currently the most popular radio program; Don McNeill's Breakfast Club was a real radio program that, according to Scully, Swartzwelder used to listen to. The Kevin Costner film The Postman is also referenced in the episode. Burns' unveiling of the Loch Ness Monster is ruined as the numerous camera flashes blind him, causing him to knock over some lights, starting a fire; this is a reference to the film King Kong, although in the film, the flashes enrage the captured gorilla Kong, as opposed to his captor. The monster's roars are taken from the Jurassic Park Tyrannosaurus rex. The episode's title references the Beatles' song "Can't Buy Me Love".

== Reception ==
In its original American broadcast on May 2, 1999, "Monty Can't Buy Me Love" received a 7.3 rating, according to Nielsen Media Research, translating to approximately 7.26 million viewers. The episode finished in 43rd place in the ratings for the week of April 26 – May 2, 1999. On August 7, 2007, the episode was released as part of The Simpsons – The Complete Tenth Season DVD box set. Mike Scully, George Meyer, Ian Maxtone-Graham, Ron Hauge and Matt Selman participated in the DVD's audio commentary of the episode.

Following its home video release, "Monty Can't Buy Me Love" received mixed reviews from critics. Giving the episode a positive review, Currentfilm.com considered it to be 'one of the best Mr. Burns-centric episodes ever', and that it has 'some classic Burns moments, especially when Monty describes exactly what it took for him to capture the creature'. Colin Jacobson of DVD Movie Guide stated that, while the episode 'doesn't do a lot to expand the character', it 'manages a reasonable number of yuks'. He added that "A fun Howard Stern-esque character done by Michael McKean helps make this a nice show." David Plath of DVD Town wrote that the episode has 'some funny moments'. Giving the episode a mixed review, Gary Russell and Gareth Roberts, of I Can't Believe It's a Bigger and Better Updated Unofficial Simpsons Guide said that the episode is 'very funny when it's funny, very poor when it isn't'. They wrote that the best part of the episode is 'the Scottish stuff', and 'the idea that, once again, Burns is actually worried about his public image, as he was in "The Joy of Sect"'. Jake McNeill, of Digital Entertainment News, gave the episode a negative review, and wrote that 'the story takes too long to get going'.
