= Homer to the Max =

- The Simpsons episode
- Episode no.: Season 10; Episode 13
- Directed by: Pete Michels
- Written by: John Swartzwelder
- Production code: AABF09
- Original air date: February 7, 1999

Guest appearance
- Ed Begley Jr. as himself

Episode features
- Chalkboard gag: "No one wants to hear about my sciatica"
- Couch gag: Marge carries a laundry basket and hangs sheet versions of Homer, Bart, Lisa, and Maggie on a clothesline in the living room.
- Commentary: Mike Scully; Richard Appel; Matt Selman; Ron Hauge; Pete Michels

Episode chronology
← Previous "Sunday, Cruddy Sunday"	Next → "I'm with Cupid"
- The Simpsons season 10

"Homer to the Max" is the thirteenth episode of the tenth season of the American animated television series The Simpsons. It originally aired on Fox in the United States on February 7, 1999. In the episode, Homer discovers that a new television show, Police Cops, has a hero also named Homer Simpson. He is delighted with the positive attention he receives because of his name, but when the television character is rewritten from a hero to a bumbling idiot, he is mocked and taunted, so he changes his name to "Max Power" to rid himself of the negative attention. Max gains new friends, and is forced into a protest to prevent a forest from being knocked down. In the end, he changes his name back to Homer Simpson.

The episode was written by John Swartzwelder and directed by Pete Michels.

Since airing, it has received mixed reviews from television critics. Overall, the episode received a Nielsen rating of 8.5.

== Plot ==
The Simpson family watches the pilot episode of Police Cops, which follows a duo of suave and dashing detectives, Lance Kaufman and Homer Simpson. Homer is delighted with the positive attention he receives from townspeople for sharing the lead character's name, as well as the character's personality, despite the family telling him it is just a coincidence.

Following the pilot, however, the Homer Simpson character is rewritten as Lance's overweight and inept comic relief sidekick who mistakes the toys for guns program as "guns for toys" and the police chief's insulin shipment for illegal drugs. He also spouts the mindless catchphrase “Uh-oh! SpaghettiOs!”, resulting in Homer being mocked by the people of Springfield. Humiliated, he appeals to the producers to change the character back, but they refuse, instead using Homer's plea and incompetent exit as material. Then, after unsuccessfully attempting to sue the company for improper usage of his old name, Homer legally changes his name to "Max Power", the only correctly spelled or sensible name on the list he presented to the presiding judge. Though the negative attention fades away, Marge is unhappy that Homer changed his name without consulting her.

With his new identity comes a massive change in attitude, as Max is much more assertive and freewheeling than Homer was. While shopping at Costington's, Max meets a successful businessman named Trent Steel. Trent invites Max and the family to a garden party, despite Marge's reservations, where they meet many famous people, but Max finds out the party is an excuse to save a redwood forest from destruction. After travelling with the party guests to the forest, Max, Marge, and everyone else chain themselves to the trees to prevent the bulldozers from knocking them down. The Springfield police arrive and Eddie and Lou chase Max around his tree, trying to "swab" him with mace. As Max rounds the tree, the chain cuts into it. The redwood falls and knocks down all other redwoods, angering their newfound friends. Max later changes his name back to "Homer Simpson", but attempts to get Marge to agree to change hers into something sexually suggestive such as "Chesty LaRue", "Busty St. Claire", or "Hootie McBoob".

== Production ==
The show's writers had read a story in the newspaper about people with famous names and came up with a way of how Homer's life could be affected if he saw someone on TV with his name. While creating the Homer Simpson television character, the production staff was deciding if the character should be "cool" throughout the episode, or if he should be an idiot from the beginning. The staff decided to use both methods and have him become an idiot after being seen as cool in the first episode of the new program. The hat Homer wears while walking through the mall is a parody of one owned by Woody Allen. Ron Hauge, a The Simpsons show producer, suggested the name Max Power to a friend who wanted to change his name. His friend, however, did not take it. The episode would also inspire Tom Martin's cousin to name his son Max Power.

One scene from the episode features Ned Flanders commenting that cartoons are easily able to change voice actors; for this scene, Ned was voiced by recurring cast member Karl Wiedergott instead of his regular voice actor Harry Shearer.

== Cultural references ==
The TV show Police Cops is a parody of the television series Miami Vice. One of the new TV shows features Archie Bunker in the show All in the Family 1999. Homer suggests the names Hercules Rockefeller, Rembrandt Q. Einstein, and Handsome B. Wonderful to Judge Snyder for his name change. The "Max Power" song is sung to the melody of "Goldfinger", the theme from the James Bond film Goldfinger (1964). Actors Woody Harrelson and Ed Begley Jr., President Bill Clinton and producers Lorne Michaels, Brian Grazer and Jerry Bruckheimer are shown in attendance at the party (Grazer's appearance is identical to his guest-voice appearance as himself from "When You Dish Upon a Star", while Bruckheimer, who has not done a voice cameo for the show, is the thin man with a beard standing next to Grazer and wearing a bright sportcoat over a plain T-shirt). The police attempting to "swab" the protestors is a reference to several incidents in 1997 in which sheriff's deputies of Humboldt County, California, swabbed pepper spray in the eyes of environmental protesters.

== Reception ==
"Homer to the Max" finished 39th in the weekly ratings for the week of Feb 1–7, 1999, with a Nielsen rating of 8.5.

Since airing, this episode has received mixed reviews from television critics.

The authors of the book I Can't Believe It's a Bigger and Better Updated Unofficial Simpsons Guide, Warren Martyn and Adrian Wood, wrote that though it was "funny in all the right places, this is an episode of two distinct stories, neither of which mesh together. The whole Ed Begley Jr. saving the forest bit seems to have been tacked on, as if the stuff about Homer finding his name being abused (shades of Mr. Sparkle again?) ran out of steam. Not a bad show, more a sort of 'So what?' show."

Robert Canning of IGN gave the episode a 7.7/10 rating, commenting that "it has a number of really funny scenes and memorable lines", but overall "the storyline didn't really have anywhere to go and the final half of the third act is a complete waste of time."

Morgan Larrick of About.com noted "Homer to the Max" as "one of the most unforgettable episodes" when reviewing the complete tenth season.
