= The Simpsons season 10 =

Season of television series

The Simpsons
- Season 10
- DVD cover featuring (from front to back) Bart Simpson, Lisa Simpson, Homer Simpson, the Squeaky-Voiced Teen, Maggie Simpson and Marge Simpson
- Showrunner: Mike Scully
- No. of episodes: 23

Release
- Original network: Fox
- Original release: August 23, 1998 – May 16, 1999

Season chronology
- ← Previous; Season 9 Next → Season 11

The tenth season of the American animated sitcom The Simpsons aired on Fox between August 23, 1998, and May 16, 1999. It contains 23 episodes, starting with "Lard of the Dance". The Simpsons is a satire of a middle-class American lifestyle epitomized by its family of the same name, which consists of Homer, Marge, Bart, Lisa and Maggie. Set in the fictional city of Springfield, the show lampoons American culture, society, television, and many aspects of the human condition.

The showrunner for the tenth season was Mike Scully. Before production began, a salary dispute between the main cast members of The Simpsons and Fox arose. However, it was soon settled and the actors' salaries were raised to $125,000 per episode. In addition to the large Simpsons cast, many guest stars appeared in season ten, including Phil Hartman in his last appearance due to his death months earlier in May 1998.

Season ten won an Annie Award for "Outstanding Achievement in an Animated Television Program". It ranked twenty-fifth in the season ratings with an average of 13.5 million viewers per episode. Along with season nine, season ten has been cited by several critics as the transition between the series' classic era and its decline in quality. The tenth season DVD boxset was released in the United States and Canada on August 7, 2007. It is available in two different packagings.

== Production ==
The tenth season was the second during which Mike Scully served as showrunner (he had previously run the ninth season), with the season being produced by Gracie Films and 20th Century Fox Television. As showrunner and executive producer, Scully headed the writing staff and oversaw all aspects of the show's production. However, as he told UltimateTV in January 1999, he did not "make any decisions without the staff's input. We have great staffs in all the departments from animation to writing. So I don't want to make it sound like a dictatorship." Scully was popular with the staff members, many of whom have praised his organization and management skills. Writer Tom Martin has said that he was "quite possibly the best boss I've ever worked for" and "a great manager of people". Scully's aim while running The Simpsons was to "not wreck the show". In addition to his role as showrunner during the tenth season, he co-wrote the episode "Sunday, Cruddy Sunday".

In 1999, there were around sixteen staff writers working on The Simpsons. Many of them had written for the show for several years, including John Swartzwelder and George Meyer. The third episode of the tenth season, "Bart the Mother", was the last full-length episode written by David S. Cohen, a longtime writer on the show. He left to team up with The Simpsons creator Matt Groening to develop Futurama, a series on which he served as executive producer and head writer. The tenth season marked the full-time return of staff member Al Jean, who had departed from the show after the fourth season to create the animated series The Critic. Between seasons four and ten, he had only worked periodically on the show, writing four episodes.

The main cast of the season consisted of Dan Castellaneta (Homer Simpson, Grampa Simpson, Krusty the Clown, among others), Julie Kavner (Marge Simpson), Nancy Cartwright (Bart Simpson, Ralph Wiggum, Nelson Muntz), Yeardley Smith (Lisa Simpson), Hank Azaria (Moe Szyslak, Apu Nahasapeemapetilon, Chief Wiggum, among others) and Harry Shearer (Ned Flanders, Mr. Burns, Principal Skinner, among others). Up until the production of season ten in 1998, these six main voice actors were paid $30,000 per episode. In 1998, a salary dispute between them and the Fox Broadcasting Company (which airs The Simpsons) arose, with the actors threatening to go on a strike. Fox went as far as preparing for casting of new voices, but an agreement was soon made and the actors' salaries were raised to $125,000 per episode. Groening expressed his sympathy for the cast members in an issue of Mother Jones a while after the salary dispute had been settled. He told the magazine: "They are incredibly talented, and they deserve a chance to be as rich and miserable as anyone else in Hollywood. It looked for a while there like we might not have a show, because everyone was holding firm on all sides. That's still my attitude: Hold out for as much money as you can get, but do make the deal."

Other cast members of the season included Pamela Hayden (Milhouse Van Houten, among others), Tress MacNeille (Agnes Skinner, among others), Maggie Roswell (Helen Lovejoy, Maude Flanders, among others), Russi Taylor (Martin Prince), and Karl Wiedergott. Season ten also featured a large number of guest stars, including Phil Hartman in his final appearance on the show in the episode "Bart the Mother" that originally aired on September 27, 1998. Hartman was shot dead by his wife four months before the episode aired and it was dedicated to his memory. Rather than replacing Hartman with a new voice actor, the production staff retired two of his recurring characters, Troy McClure and Lionel Hutz, from the show. Hutz and McClure still appear in various Simpsons comics.

== Voice cast & characters ==
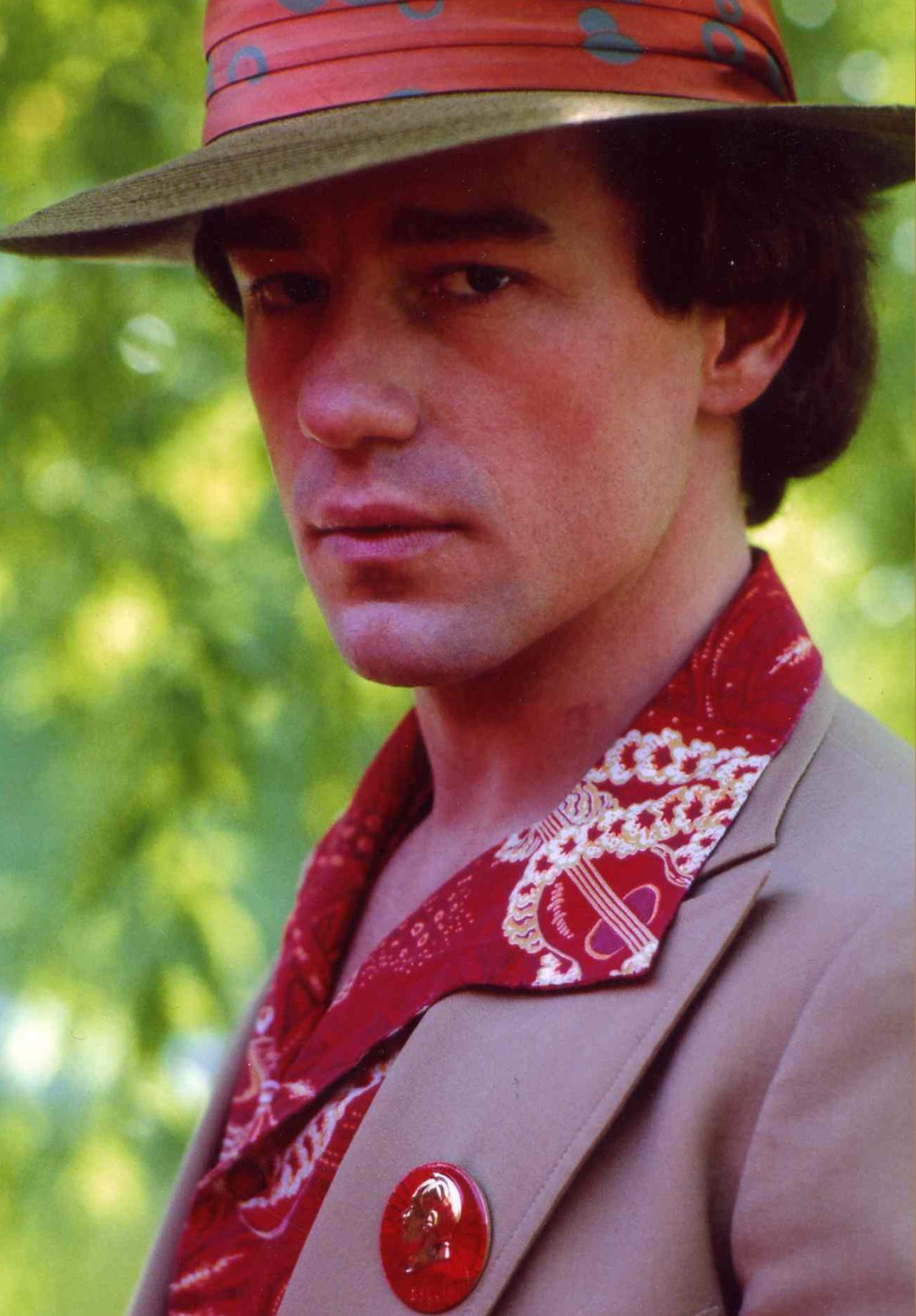
This is the last season to feature the voice of Phil Hartman; he was the most recurring male guest actor on the series.

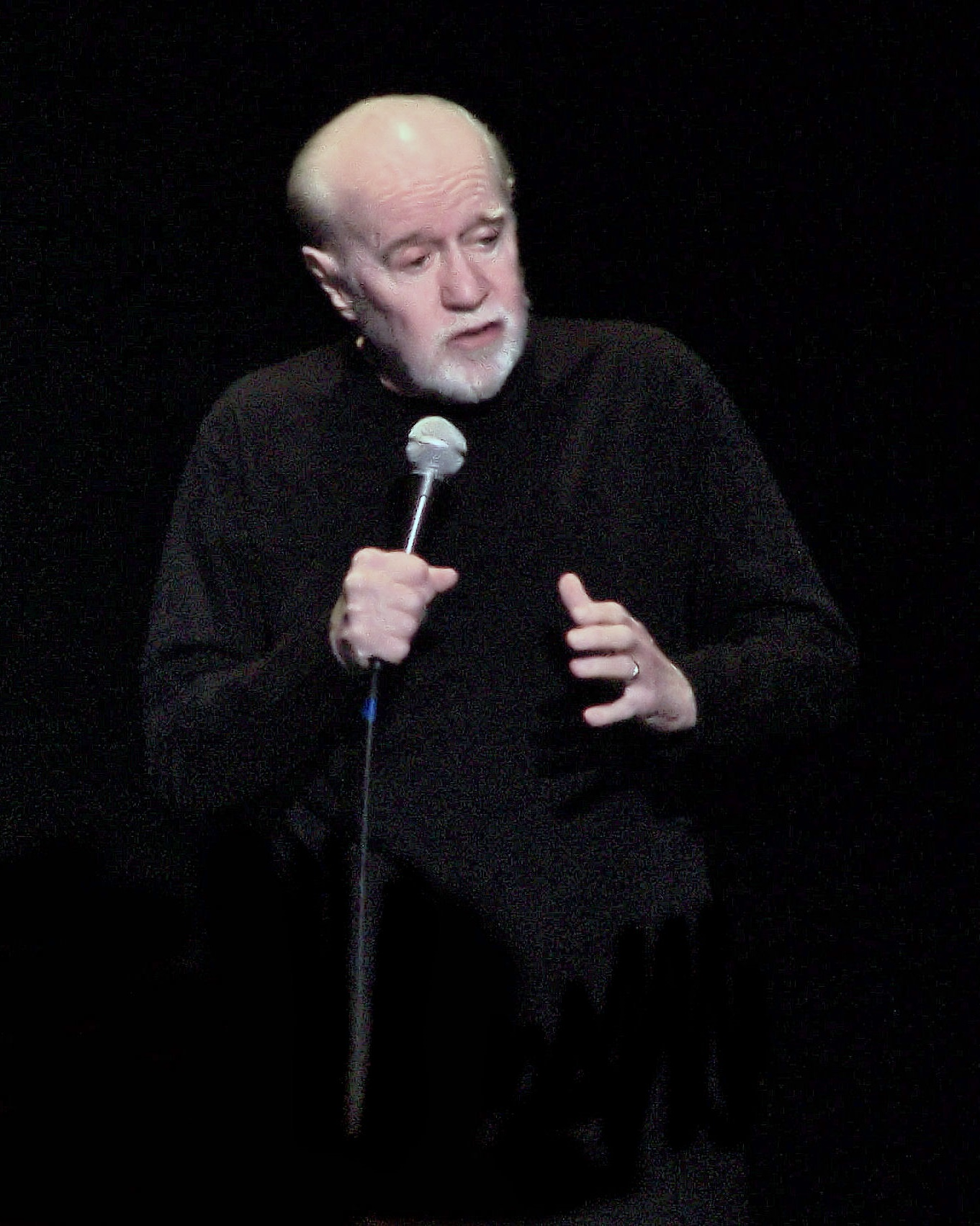
Comedian George Carlin made a guest appearance as Munchie in "D'oh-in' in the Wind".

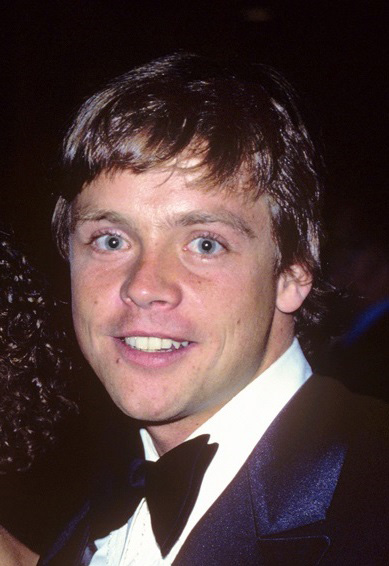
Mark Hamill guest-starred as himself and Leavelle in "Mayored to the Mob".

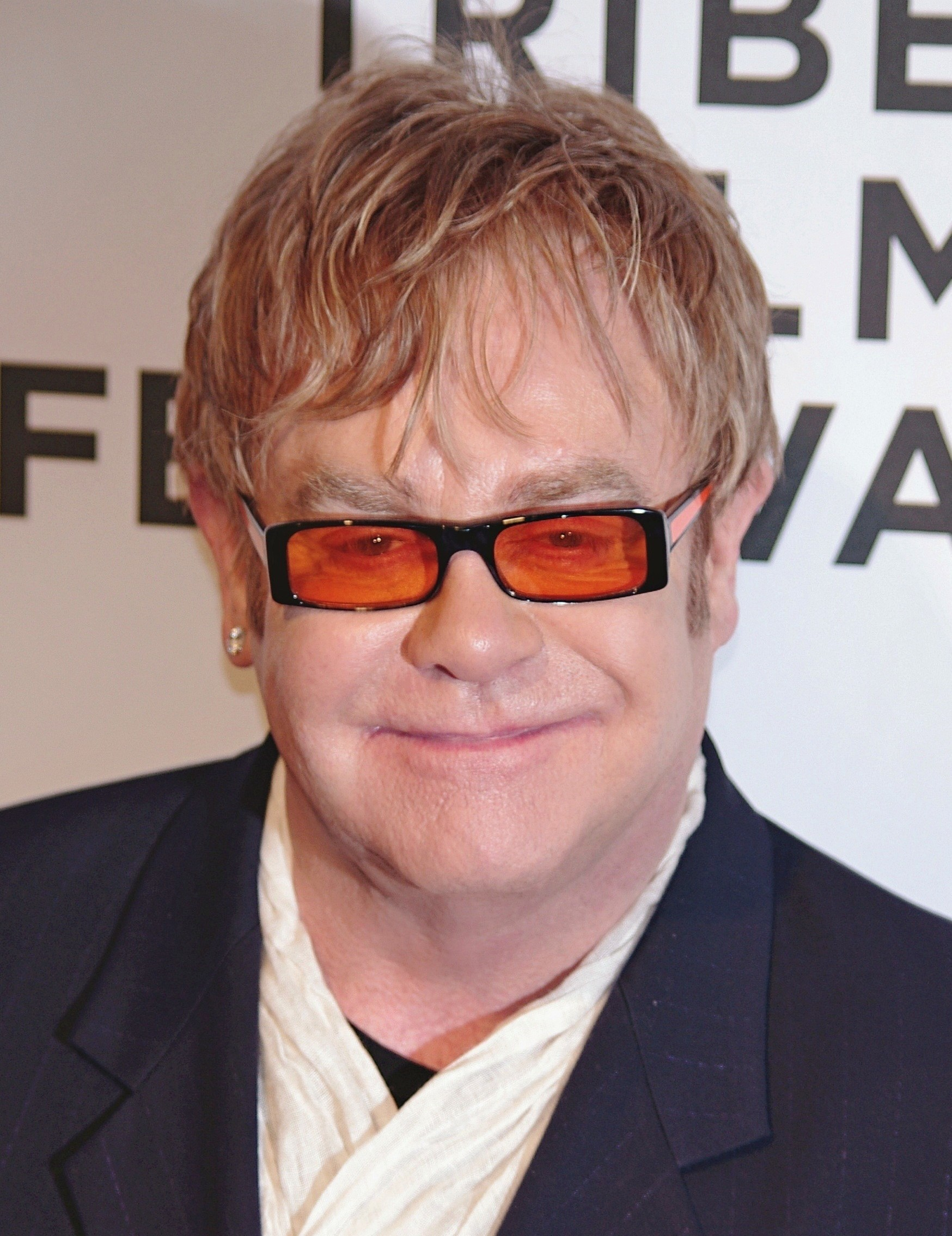
Musician Elton John made a guest appearance as himself in "I'm with Cupid".

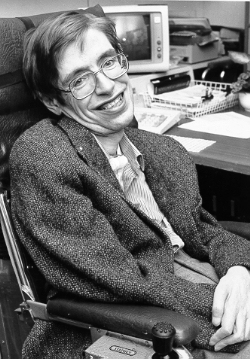
English theoretical physicist and cosmologist Stephen Hawking guest-starred as himself in the episode "They Saved Lisa's Brain".

This is the last season to feature the character Troy McClure, voiced by Phil Hartman. Following Hartman's death on May 28, 1998, McClure was retired along with Hartman's other recurring character Lionel Hutz; his final speaking role as McClure was in the third episode "Bart the Mother", which aired four months after his death. The episode was dedicated to Hartman.

=== Main cast ===
- Dan Castellaneta as Homer Simpson, Krusty the Clown, Groundskeeper Willie, Bill, Grampa Simpson, Mayor Quimby, Barney Gumble, Itchy, Poochie, Kodos, Sideshow Mel, Louie, Captain Lance Murdock, Gil Gunderson, Snake, Rich Texan, Santa's Little Helper, Hans Moleman and various others
- Julie Kavner as Marge Simpson, Patty Bouvier, Selma Bouvier and various others
- Nancy Cartwright as Bart Simpson, Ralph Wiggum, Nelson Muntz, Database, Rod Flanders, Todd Flanders, Lewis Clark, Kearney Zzyzwicz and various others
- Yeardley Smith as Lisa Simpson
- Hank Azaria as Apu, Luigi Risotto, Moe Szyslak, Professor Frink, Snake, Chief Wiggum, Dr. Nick Riviera, Lou, Carl Carlson, Comic Book Guy, Kirk Van Houten, Superintendent Chalmers, Legs, Cletus Spuckler, Drederick Tatum, Pyro, Captain McCallister, Bumblebee Man, State Comptroller Atkins, Doug, Old Jewish Man and various others
- Harry Shearer as Principal Skinner, Marty, Lenny Leonard, Ned Flanders, Kent Brockman, Reverend Lovejoy, Jasper Beardsley, Mr. Burns, Waylon Smithers, Scratchy, Dr. Hibbert, Kang, Maggie Simpson, Sanjay Nahasapeemapetilon, Eddie, Otto Mann, Judge Snyder, Rainier Wolfcastle and various others

=== Recurring ===
- Pamela Hayden as Milhouse Van Houten, Wendell Borton, Lewis Clark, Rod Flanders, Ginger Flanders, Sarah Wiggum, Jimbo Jones and various others
- Tress MacNeille as Agnes Skinner, Mona Simpson, Amber Simpson, Mrs. Muntz, Jimbo Jones, Bernice Hibbert, Lindsey Naegle and various others
- Maggie Roswell as Miss Hoover, Maude Flanders, Helen Lovejoy, Luann Van Houten, Ruth Powers and various others
- Russi Taylor as Sherri and Terri, Allison Taylor, Janey Powell, Martin Prince, Billy and Uter Zorker
- Karl Wiedergott as Ned Flanders (Homer to the Max) and additional characters

=== Guest stars ===
- Marcia Wallace as Edna Krabappel (9 episodes)
- Lisa Kudrow as Alex Whitney ("Lard of the Dance")
- William Daniels as KITT ("The Wizard of Evergreen Terrace")
- Phil Hartman as Troy McClure ("Bart the Mother")
- Robert Englund as Freddy Krueger ("Treehouse of Horror IX")
- Ed McMahon as himself ("Treehouse of Horror IX")
- Jerry Springer as himself ("Treehouse of Horror IX")
- Regis Philbin as himself ("Treehouse of Horror IX", live-action sequence)
- Kathie Lee Gifford as herself ("Treehouse of Horror IX", live-action sequence)
- Alec Baldwin as himself ("When You Dish Upon a Star")
- Kim Basinger as herself ("When You Dish Upon a Star")
- Ron Howard as himself ("When You Dish Upon a Star")
- Brian Grazer as himself ("When You Dish Upon a Star")
- Yo La Tengo perform the end theme in "D'oh-in' in the Wind"
- George Carlin as Munchie ("D'oh-in' in the Wind")
- Martin Mull as Seth ("D'oh-in' in the Wind")
- Mark Hamill as himself and Leavelle ("Mayored to the Mob")
- Joe Mantegna as Fat Tony ("Mayored to the Mob")
- Dick Tufeld as Lost in Space Robot ("Mayored to the Mob")
- The Moody Blues as themselves ("Viva Ned Flanders")
- Cyndi Lauper as herself ("Wild Barts Can't Be Broken")
- Troy Aikman as himself ("Sunday, Cruddy Sunday")
- Rosey Grier as himself ("Sunday, Cruddy Sunday")
- John Madden as himself ("Sunday, Cruddy Sunday")
- Dan Marino as himself ("Sunday, Cruddy Sunday")
- Rupert Murdoch as himself ("Sunday, Cruddy Sunday")
- Dolly Parton as herself ("Sunday, Cruddy Sunday")
- Pat Summerall as himself ("Sunday, Cruddy Sunday")
- Fred Willard as Wally Kogen ("Sunday, Cruddy Sunday")
- Ed Begley Jr. as himself ("Homer to the Max")
- Jan Hooks as Manjula Nahasapeemapetilon ("I'm with Cupid")
- Elton John as himself ("I'm with Cupid")
- John Kassir as Possum ("Marge Simpson in: 'Screaming Yellow Honkers'")
- Hank Williams Jr. as Canyonero singer ("Marge Simpson in: 'Screaming Yellow Honkers'")
- Isabella Rossellini as Astrid Weller ("Mom and Pop Art")
- Jasper Johns as himself ("Mom and Pop Art")
- Jack LaLanne as himself ("The Old Man and the 'C' Student")
- Michael McKean as Jerry Rude ("Monty Can't Buy Me Love")
- Stephen Hawking as himself ("They Saved Lisa's Brain")
- George Takei as Wink ("Thirty Minutes over Tokyo")
- Denice Kumagai as Japanese Mother ("Thirty Minutes over Tokyo")
- Karen Maruyama as Japanese Stewardess ("Thirty Minutes over Tokyo")
- Gedde Watanabe as Japanese Father and Waiter ("Thirty Minutes over Tokyo")
- Keone Young as Sumo Wrestler ("Thirty Minutes over Tokyo")

== Release ==
=== Broadcast and ratings ===
The tenth season of The Simpsons was originally broadcast in the United States on the Fox network between August 23, 1998, and May 16, 1999. Although "Lard of the Dance" aired on August 23 (billed as a "summer original") to increase ratings for the early premieres of That '70s Show by serving as a lead-in, "The Wizard of Evergreen Terrace" (airing on September 20, 1998) was the official premiere of the tenth season. The season aired in the 8:00 p.m. time slot on Sundays. It ranked twenty-fifth (tied with Dharma & Greg) in the ratings for the 1998–1999 television season with an average of 13.5 million viewers per episode, dropping twelve percent in number of average viewers from the last season. The Simpsons was Fox's third-highest-rated show of the television season, following The X-Files (ranked twelfth) and Ally McBeal (ranked twentieth).

=== Critical reception ===
The tenth season, along with season nine, has been cited by some critics and fans as a transitional period between the series' classic era and the beginning of its decline in quality. Chris Turner wrote in his book Planet Simpson that "one of the things that emerged was that [the staff] began to rely on gags, not characters, wherever that switch got flipped, whether it's the ninth or tenth season." Jesse Hassenger of PopMatters and Chris Barsanti of Filmcritic.com both commented that around the time the tenth season aired, the show began shifting to elements such as more outlandish plots, broader humor, and increased celebrity guests. DVD Verdict's Mac McEntire noted in a review that while the tenth season contains "a lot of laughs", it is missing the emotional core of the earlier seasons. Michael Passman of The Michigan Daily wrote in 2007 that "in hindsight, the 10th season can now be seen as a tipping point of sorts for a number of the show's less attractive plot devices. Homer's get-rich-quick schemes start to become all too prevalent, and there are an inordinate amount of unnecessary celebrity cameos." Passman commented that it "is not the last great 'Simpsons' season ever. The last great season was the eighth. The last really good season was the ninth. But the tenth is just pretty good, nothing more, nothing less." Mike Scully, who was showrunner during seasons nine through twelve, is held responsible by many critics and fans for the decline.

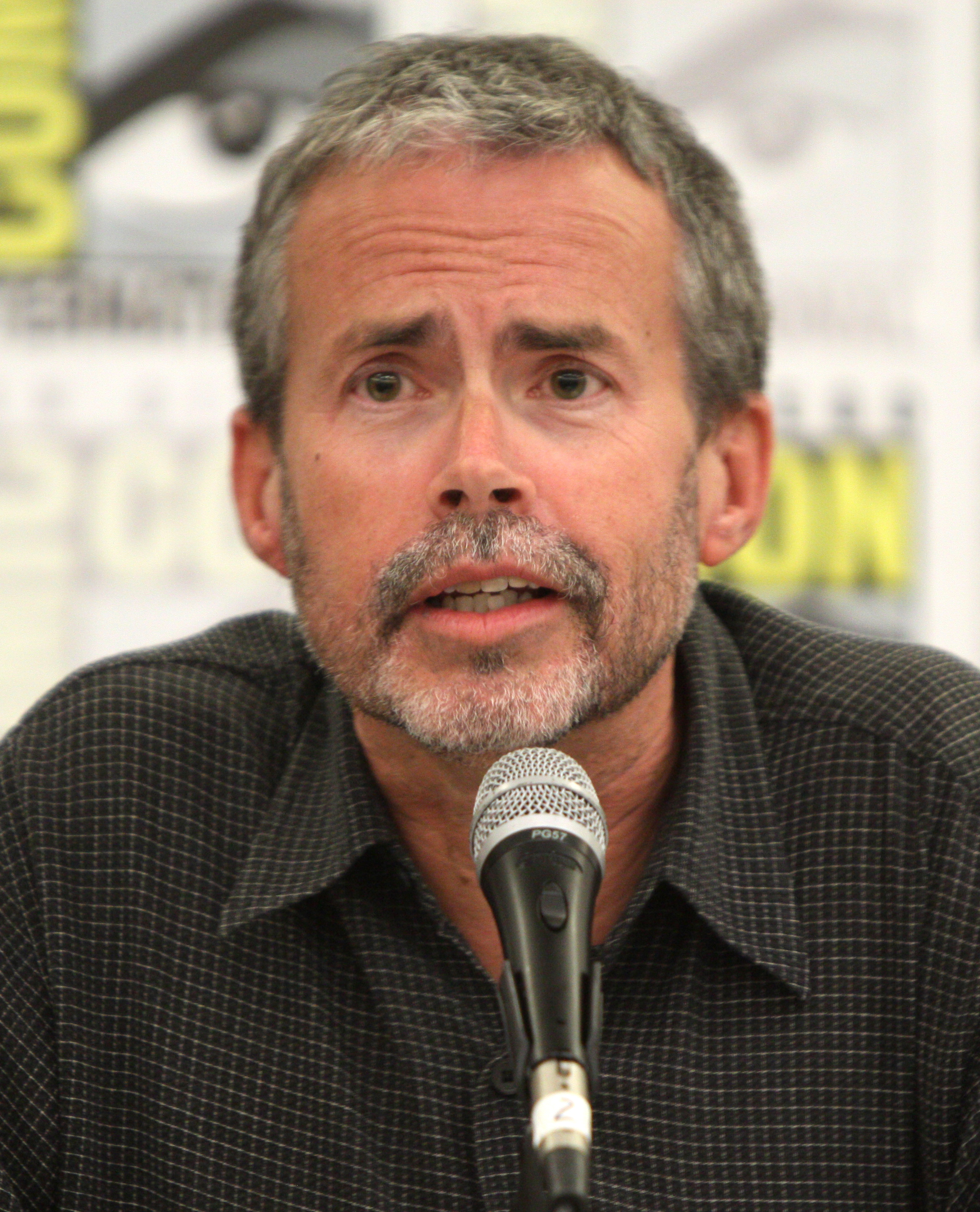
Mike Scully, showrunner of season ten, has been the target of criticism.

In his book The Simpsons: An Uncensored, Unauthorized History, John Ortved noted that it is hard to tell how much of the decline is Scully's fault, and that blaming a single showrunner for lowering the quality of the show "is unfair." He also wrote that some episodes from Scully's first two seasons (nine and ten), such as "The Wizard of Evergreen Terrace" and "When You Dish Upon a Star", are better than certain episodes of the two previous seasons. UGO Networks' Brian Tallerico defended the season against the criticism, saying in his review that comparing "tenth-season Simpsons episodes to the prime of the series (3–7) is just unfair and really kind of self-defeating. 'Yeah, I laughed, but not as hard as a couple of years ago. So it sucks.' That's nonsense. The fact is that even the tenth season of The Simpsons was funnier than most [other] show's [sic] best years." PopMatters' Hassenger commented in his review that although the show had declined in quality, "this is not to say that these episodes are without their charm; many, in fact, are laugh-out-loud funny and characteristically smart." Similarly to Tallerico, he also noted that "weaker Simpsons seasons are superior to most television." On Rotten Tomatoes, the tenth season of The Simpsons has a 100% approval rating based on 5 critical reviews.

Despite the criticisms of season ten, it has been included in some definitions of The Simpsons' golden age, usually as the point where the show began to decline but still put out some of the last great episodes. Ian Nathan of Empire described the show's classic era as being "the first ten seasons", while Rubbercat.net believes that "discussing what constitutes The Simpsons' 'golden era' is a universal constant," in this case being seasons 3–10. Jon Heacock of LucidWorks states that while season ten was "the season in which, according to many, the show starts to go sour," it was also the final season where "the show was consistently at the top of its game." In an article written for The Modern Day Pirates titled "In Search of The Last Classic Simpsons Episode", author Brandon listed "Homer to the Max" and "They Saved Lisa's Brain", both from the tenth season, as contenders for the latest episode that made him feel like he was "watching The Simpsons in their heyday."

=== Awards and nominations ===
The season and its episodes gathered some awards and award nominations. The Simpsons won the 1999 Annie Award for "Outstanding Achievement in an Animated Television Program", beating Batman Beyond, Futurama, King of the Hill, and The New Batman/Superman Adventures. That same year, Tim Long, Larry Doyle, and Matt Selman received an Annie Award in the "Outstanding Individual Achievement for Writing in an Animated Television Production" category for writing "Simpsons Bible Stories", the eighteenth episode of the tenth season. The trio faced competition from writers of Futurama ("The Series Has Landed"), King of the Hill ("Hank's Cowboy Movie"), Batman Beyond ("Rebirth Part I"), and Space Ghost Coast to Coast ("Lawsuit"). The Simpsons was also nominated for two Emmy Awards in 1999, though the show did not win either. The season ten episode "Viva Ned Flanders" lost in the "Outstanding Animated Program (for Programming Less Than One Hour)" category to "And They Call It Bobby Love" of King of the Hill. Alf Clausen was nominated in the "Outstanding Music Composition for a Series" category for his work on "Treehouse of Horror IX", the fourth episode of the tenth season, but lost the award to Carl Johnson of Invasion America.

== Episodes ==
No. overall	No. in season	Title	Directed by	Written by	Original release date	Prod. code	U.S. viewers (millions)
204	1	"Lard of the Dance"	Dominic Polcino	Jane O'Brien	August 23, 1998	5F20	11.84 7.0 (HH) (Note: (HH) denotes that the numbers listed are the number of households the episode was viewed in.)
All the girls in Lisa's class are impressed by the mature, trendy personality of a new student named Alex Whitney, and do everything they can to be just like her. Lisa, who is not as impressed and chooses to be herself, is forgotten by her classmates and becomes jealous of Alex. Lisa's friends and Alex decide to host a school dance and they buy outfits for it in order to get dates. When Lisa goes to the dance, she discovers that the boys and the girls are at separate ends of the room, too embarrassed to dance with each other. As a result, Lisa is able to prove that Alex and her classmates are only children and not as mature as they try to be. Meanwhile, Homer convinces Bart to drop out of school for what he thinks to be a more promising pursuit: selling grease. However, this endeavor fails when their business results in a scuffle with Groundskeeper Willie. Guest star: Lisa Kudrow
205	2	"The Wizard of Evergreen Terrace"	Mark Kirkland	John Swartzwelder	September 20, 1998	5F21	13.90 7.95 (HH)
Homer discovers that he has not done anything in life that will be remembered after he dies, so he decides to become an inventor like Thomas Edison. However, his initial inventions such as an electric hammer are considered unpractical and are not well received. After a period of depression, Homer comes up with his first good invention—a chair that cannot tip over—only to discover that Edison also invented the same design. However, Edison's invention has remained unnoticed in Edison's preserved office at the Edison National Historic Site in West Orange New Jersey, so Homer sets out to destroy it. There, he has a change of heart and returns home, only to leave his electric hammer behind. When the museum staff members find it, they believe it is an undiscovered invention by Edison. The hammer becomes a success and Edison's heirs earn a lot of money, making Homer angry.
206	3	"Bart the Mother"	Steven Dean Moore	David X. Cohen	September 27, 1998	5F22	11.94 7.35 (HH)
Nelson invites Bart over to test a BB gun he "won" at an arcade center. When Bart uses it and accidentally kills a bird mother, Marge becomes furious with him, thinking that he killed the animal on purpose. Bart feels guilty for what he has done and takes it upon himself to nurse the mother's orphaned eggs. Marge soon finds out about this and becomes proud of him. However, when the eggs hatch, they are found to be lizards that lived in the bird's nest. Skinner, a member of the Springfield Birdwatching Society, tells Bart that the lizards must die because they kill so many species of birds. Bart refuses and helps the lizards escape. After the lizards devour the pigeon population, which the townsfolk considered to be a nuisance, Bart is honored by Mayor Quimby. Note: This episode was dedicated to Phil Hartman.
207	4	"Treehouse of Horror IX"	Steven Dean Moore	Donick Cary	October 25, 1998	AABF01	15.12 8.5 (HH)
207	4	"Treehouse of Horror IX"	Steven Dean Moore	Larry Doyle	October 25, 1998	AABF01	15.12 8.5 (HH)
207	4	"Treehouse of Horror IX"	Steven Dean Moore	David X. Cohen	October 25, 1998	AABF01	15.12 8.5 (HH)
In the ninth Treehouse of Horror episode, there are three stories: "Hell Toupée" – Homer gets a hair transplant from Snake Jailbird, who was sentenced to death after breaking the city's three-strikes law. Snake's spirit possesses Homer through the hair, forcing Homer to kill the people who witnessed against Snake after his final crime, including Bart. "The Terror of Tiny Toon" – When Lisa and Bart find a plutonium rod to use as a remote control battery, the two get sucked into a special, extremely violent Halloween episode of The Itchy & Scratchy Show. "Starship Poopers" – Marge, Homer, and Kang end up on The Jerry Springer Show after Marge confesses to Homer that Maggie is an alien and that Kang is her real father.
208	5	"When You Dish Upon a Star"	Pete Michels	Richard Appel	November 8, 1998	5F19	15.34 9.0 (HH)
When a parasailing accident sends Homer crashing into the secret home of Hollywood couple Kim Basinger and Alec Baldwin, they hire him as their personal assistant, provided that Homer does not tell anyone where they live. The couple starts to become irritated with Homer, who gives them ridiculous suggestions for film screenplays. When he accidentally violates their trust by revealing their location in Springfield, the couple immediately end the friendship. After a chase between the Hollywood stars in their Hummer and Homer in his mobile museum of stuff that belongs to the couple, Homer is ordered by a court of law to remain 500 miles away from any celebrity. Guest stars: Alec Baldwin, Kim Basinger, Ron Howard and Brian Grazer
209	6	"D'oh-in' in the Wind"	Mark Kirkland & Matthew Nastuk	Donick Cary	November 15, 1998	AABF02	13.94 8.3 (HH)
While filling out a Screen Actors Guild form (after starring in an instructional video filmed at the nuclear plant where he works), Homer realizes that he does not know what his middle initial "J" stands for. After finding the answer, "Jay", on a mural in the hippie commune where his mother once lived, Homer decides to live the hippie lifestyle. He stays with his mother's old friends Seth and Munchie who now own a juice company. Homer quickly ruins one of their juice shipments by accident, and tries to make up for it by taking crops from their garden and making juice with them. However, some of these crops contained drugs and after people start to have crazy hallucinations from drinking the juice, Chief Wiggum arrives to arrest Seth and Munchie. Homer stands up for their rights and ends up with a gunshot-propelled flower embedded in his head. Guest stars: George Carlin and Martin Mull
210	7	"Lisa Gets an 'A'"	Bob Anderson	Ian Maxtone-Graham	November 22, 1998	AABF03	13.61 8.0 (HH)
While sick from school, Lisa becomes obsessed with a video game and forgets to study for a test on the book The Wind in the Willows. Not willing to fail, she calls upon Bart and Nelson to help her pass via Nelson's archive of "study aids", and gets an A+++. Consequently, Springfield Elementary School now qualifies for a basic assistance grant as Lisa's grade lifted the overall GPA enough. Tormented by guilt for cheating, she reveals what she did to Skinner and Superintendent Chalmers, who try to persuade her to keep it a secret so the school can keep the money. At the grant ceremony, Lisa finally blurts out her indiscretion, prior the real ceremony taking place as Skinner and Chalmers had anticipated her actions, with Bart using a dummy to substitute for her. Meanwhile, Homer houses a lobster to eat, but becomes emotionally attached to it and makes it his pet. However, he accidentally boils it to death while giving it a hot bath, and eats it sadly.
211	8	"Homer Simpson in: 'Kidney Trouble'"	Mike B. Anderson	John Swartzwelder	December 6, 1998	AABF04	12.38 7.2 (HH)
As the Simpson family is driving home after spending the day at a ghost town tourist attraction, Grampa needs to use the restroom but Homer refuses to stop the car. Grampa is forced to hold his urine in for hours and as a result his kidneys explode. With not much time left for Grampa to live, Homer offers to give his father one of his kidneys. However, he runs away from the hospital out of fear of the procedure and decides to hide, feeling shame for leaving Grampa on the operating table. He joins a group of weird characters on a ship who are also hiding out of shame for things they have done in their lives. However, Homer is rejected even from these outcasts because they are angered and disgusted by what he has done to his father. They throw him into the ocean and he drifts back to Springfield. There, he plans on giving his kidney again, but runs away at the last minute once more. After being knocked out by a car while fleeing from the hospital, he wakes up and sees a hale Abe, wrongly believing he just recovered miraculously before he notices incision outlines on his side...
212	9	"Mayored to the Mob"	Swinton O. Scott III	Ron Hauge	December 20, 1998	AABF05	13.90 8.5 (HH)
After saving Mayor Quimby and Mark Hamill from rioters at a science fiction convention, Homer becomes Quimby's bodyguard. When Homer discovers that Mafia leader Fat Tony is providing rat milk to the schools of Springfield, he forces Quimby to expose Tony in return for saving Quimby from falling off a ledge. After Tony is arrested, he threatens to take Quimby's life. While Quimby is spending an evening at a dinner theater, Homer discovers that Fat Tony is there alongside his henchman, Louie, having been released on bail. Homer foils an attempt by Louie to kill Quimby, and as Homer and Louie fight, Tony is able to savagely beat Quimby with a baseball bat. However, Tony makes sure to only restore Quimby's fear of the Mafia and not kill him, and Mark Hamill assures Homer he did a great job as a bodyguard. Guest star: Mark Hamill
213	10	"Viva Ned Flanders"	Neil Affleck	David M. Stern	January 10, 1999	AABF06	19.68 11.5 (HH)
When Springfield's only casino is demolished because of curfew, massive dust clouds form, prompting the Simpson family and Ned Flanders to go to a car wash to get rid of the dust on their cars. There, Homer sees Ned gets a senior discount. Thinking that Flanders is not a senior and lying about his age, Homer reveals this at church. As a result, Ned is forced to admit to everyone that he is 60 years old and only looks young because he has never done anything exciting in his life. Out of pity, Homer decides to take him to Las Vegas, where, after a night of partying and gambling, they end up marrying two casino barmaids while drunk. As Homer and Ned try to escape from the barmaids the next day, they go on a wild rampage through the casino, until they are confronted by casino security and banned from ever visiting Las Vegas again.
214	11	"Wild Barts Can't Be Broken"	Mark Ervin	Larry Doyle	January 17, 1999	AABF07	15.21 8.8 (HH)
Homer, Lenny, Carl, and Barney celebrate a turnaround-capping title victory for the Springfield Isotopes baseball team and end up going on a drunken rampage through town. During this rampage, they vandalize Springfield Elementary School. The next morning, Chief Wiggum decides without evidence that students committed the crime and places all of Springfield's youth under a curfew. The children respond by setting up a pirate radio show in which they reveal the embarrassing secrets of Springfield's adults. The location from which the children send out the broadcast is soon tracked down and an argument between the children and the adults ensues. As each side is stating their case in a song, the senior citizens turn up to complain about the children and the adults. Both the kids and their parents end up getting screwed because a senior citizen-decided vote puts everyone who's under 70 in the curfew zone, and Grandpa and his friends enjoy the night out.
215	12	"Sunday, Cruddy Sunday"	Steven Dean Moore	Tom Martin, George Meyer, Brian Scully & Mike Scully	January 31, 1999	AABF08	19.11 11.5 (HH)
While buying new tires for his car, Homer meets a travel agent who offers Homer a free bus ride to the Super Bowl, as long as he can find enough people to fill the agent's bus. A group of Springfield men tag along to what soon becomes a problematic trip after the tickets are discovered to be fake. As a result, they are locked in "Super Bowl Jail". Thanks to help from Dolly Parton, they break out and attempt to find the football field, until they get lost in the sea of players that run through the corridors of the stadium to the locker room after winning the Super Bowl. Much to their happiness, Homer and his friends end up in the locker room with the players, and leave happily as John Madden and Pat Summerall note the episode had no football or music scenes. Meanwhile, Marge and Lisa try to find the missing parts of "Vincent Price's Egg Magic", a celebrity-endorsed craft kit.
216	13	"Homer to the Max"	Pete Michels	John Swartzwelder	February 7, 1999	AABF09	13.98 8.3 (HH)
Homer is delighted with the positive attention he receives after a new television show airs that features a police character also named Homer Simpson. However, when the character is changed from a hero to a bumbling idiot by the show's producers, Homer is mocked and taunted by those he knows, so he changes his name to "Max Power" to rid himself of the negative attention. The new name earns Homer respect, and he and Marge are invited to a party where they meet a lot of famous people who are going to save a redwood forest from destruction by chaining themselves to the trees. However, Homer accidentally cuts his tree with his chains while running away from police officers Eddie and Lou. The tree knocks down all the other redwoods in a chain reaction, angering Max's newfound friends. In the end, Max changes his name back to Homer.
217	14	"I'm with Cupid"	Bob Anderson	Dan Greaney	February 14, 1999	AABF11	12.35 7.7 (HH)
After Apu and Manjula have a big fight, Apu showers his wife with elaborate Valentine's Day gifts to make up for it, making the rest of the men in Springfield look bad in front of their women. His final gift is to write a love note to Manjula in the sky—which Homer (along with a group of other discontented male characters) plans to sabotage. When the plane is about to spray the message "I LOVE U MANJULA", Homer manages to destroy the canister at "I LOVE U ⭐️", a message that the women of Springfield think was made only for them by their partners. Homer is able to win Marge's love back by jumping out of the plane covered in roses and landing in front of her in their backyard. Meanwhile, to reconcile Apu with his wife, Elton John performs a private concert for the couple.
218	15	"Marge Simpson in: 'Screaming Yellow Honkers' "	Mark Kirkland	David M. Stern	February 21, 1999	AABF10	14.64 8.6 (HH)
Homer buys an SUV but upon discovery that it was designed as a "woman's car", he gives it to Marge. Infatuated with the car, she proceeds to develop a ferocious road rage and ends up losing her license when she fails a driving test and crashes it into a prison. However, her road rage is required when Homer accidentally sets all the rhinoceros in a zoo free. Marge agrees to assist the police in rounding up the animals, but learns there is one missing and sees Homer being carried off by it. She chases the angry rhino into a construction site and deliberately crashes the SUV, making it burst into flames. The rhino instinctively attempts to stamp out the fire, allowing Homer to escape.
219	16	"Make Room for Lisa"	Matthew Nastuk	Brian Scully	February 28, 1999	AABF12	12.40 7.6 (HH)
When Homer uses Lisa's room as a cellular phone transmitter to pay off damages he did to the Bill of Rights at a Smithsonian exhibit, Lisa is forced to move into Bart's room. Lisa becomes furious with her father for having to share a room with her brother. She fears that she and Homer will never be close because of their clashing personalities and begins to develop stress-related stomach aches. To relieve these aches, Homer and Lisa visit a New Age store where the owner convinces them to go on a spiritual journey by lying in a sensory deprivation tank for a prolonged amount of time. On her journey, Lisa discovers that beneath Homer's bumbling outside, he really does care about her. Reconciled, the two of them watch a demolition derby together, something they equally enjoy. Meanwhile, Marge uses Maggie's monitor to listen in on other people's phone calls; however, when Milhouse and Bart play a prank on her, Marge knocks Milhouse out, thinking he was a burglar.
220	17	"Maximum Homerdrive"	Swinton O. Scott III	John Swartzwelder	March 28, 1999	AABF13	15.51
While the family dines at a new steakhouse, a trucker named Red challenges Homer to a steak-eating contest. Red wins, but quickly dies of "beef poisoning", making it the first time he will miss a shipment. Feeling bad for him, Homer takes on the duty of transporting Red's cargo to Atlanta with Bart by his side. After falling asleep behind the wheel, Homer awakes to discover that the truck drove by itself with its Navitron Autodrive system. He informs other truck drivers, who tell him that he cannot let anyone know about the Autodrive system because it would cost the truckers their high-paying and no-effort jobs. Later, when cars that pass by Homer find out about it, a mob of truckers confront him. Homer and Bart escape, finish the shipment on time, and go home on a freight train. Meanwhile, after deducing that only Homer and Bart get to do the fun things in life, Marge and Lisa decide to add excitement to their lives by installing a new doorbell. However, it starts to malfunction after Lisa presses it.
221	18	"Simpsons Bible Stories"	Nancy Kruse	Tim Long	April 4, 1999	AABF14	12.86
221	18	"Simpsons Bible Stories"	Nancy Kruse	Larry Doyle	April 4, 1999	AABF14	12.86
221	18	"Simpsons Bible Stories"	Nancy Kruse	Matt Selman	April 4, 1999	AABF14	12.86
Reverend Lovejoy punishes the congregation with a thorough reading of the Bible after discovering a chocolate Easter bunny in the collection plate. This leads to the Simpson family falling asleep and dreaming of themselves in Biblical stores: Adam and Eve – Homer and Marge are Adam and Eve, who get tempted by a snake into eating the forbidden fruit from the Tree of Knowledge. Moses – Milhouse is Moses, who fights back against the Egyptians (Principal Skinner and the Springfield Police) in order to free the Jews (the children of Springfield Elementary School). King Solomon – In this short piece, Homer is King Solomon, who must decide which man (Lenny or Carl) is the true owner of a cherry pie. David and Goliath – Bart is David, who tries to slay Goliath (Nelson) after Goliath kills David's oldest friend, Methuselah, (Grampa).
222	19	"Mom and Pop Art"	Steven Dean Moore	Al Jean	April 11, 1999	AABF15	14.13 8.5 (HH)
Homer tries to assemble a barbecue pit quickly, but fails and is left with a mismatched collection of parts stuck in hardened cement. As a result, he vents his rage on the construct, mangling it further. When Homer takes the failed barbecue pit back to the store, an art dealer sees it and describes it as a masterpiece of outsider art. As a result, he gets his own art exhibition and channels his rage into his work. Marge, who had been trying to succeed at art for years, gets jealous of Homer's easy success. However, when Homer makes new art pieces for a show called "Art in America" that are similar to his first piece, his peers reject him as repetitive. In an attempt to do something groundbreaking, Homer floods Springfield and puts snorkels on the animals. The townspeople declare this a masterpiece and everyone including Marge enjoys the new "Grand Canals of Springfield".
223	20	"The Old Man and the 'C' Student"	Mark Kirkland	Julie Thacker	April 25, 1999	AABF16	11.16 6.9 (HH)
After ruining Springfield's chances of hosting the Olympics with an ethnically offensive stand-up act in front of the International Olympic Committee, Bart is forced to volunteer at the Springfield Retirement Castle. Meanwhile, Homer receives 1,000 springs he intended to sell as the mascot he created for the Olympics, Springy the Springfield Spring. He uses various get-rich-quick schemes to sell off the mascots, but fails miserably due to Springfield's hatred of Bart's comedy routine. Ultimately, Homer is forced to flush the mascots down the toilet. At the retirement home, Bart is dismayed at how little the seniors are allowed to do and decides to take them on a boat ride, which the seniors thoroughly enjoy until they crash into Mr. Burns' schooner. The boat begins to sink, but the springs that Homer flushed down the toilet out onto the bottom of the sea cause the boat to bounce up to the surface long enough for the United States Coast Guard to rescue everyone.
224	21	"Monty Can't Buy Me Love"	Mark Ervin	John Swartzwelder	May 2, 1999	AABF17	12.59 7.26 (HH)
Billionaire Arthur Fortune captures Springfield's heart by giving each customer a dollar at the opening of his new mega-store. This embarrasses the unpopular Mr. Burns, who recruits Homer to help him be loved by all. However, their various schemes fail. Feeling disappointed, Burns makes Homer, Groundskeeper Willie, and Professor Frink join him on a trip to Scotland to catch the legendary Loch Ness Monster. After some minor setbacks, Burns is able to capture the monster and sends it to Springfield to be unveiled, where the friendly "Nessie" charms all of the spectators and makes Burns more likable. However, during the unveiling, Burns is blinded by camera flashes and runs into a camera which crashes and starts a fire. As a result, the crowd flees in panic. Following this disaster, Homer cheers up Burns by pointing out that being loved means you have to be nice to people every day but being hated is effortless. Burns embraces his misanthropic nature and gets Nessie a job as a greeter at his new casino.
225	22	"They Saved Lisa's Brain"	Pete Michels	Matt Selman	May 9, 1999	AABF18	10.45 6.8 (HH)
After a riot occurs at a Springfield contest that falsely promises a luxurious trip to the most disgusting and dimwitted contest participant, Lisa, disgusted at the lack of intelligence, writes a letter that appears in the newspaper. Springfield's branch of Mensa International, consisting of Comic Book Guy, Dr. Hibbert, Principal Skinner, Professor Frink, and Lindsay Naegle, is impressed and invites Lisa to join the group. When the Mensa members lose their gazebo at the park, they go to complain to Mayor Quimby. However, the mayor thinks they are there to confront him about his political corruption so he flees from Springfield. As a result, Lisa and the others are granted power to the city since they are the smartest. The power eventually corrupts them and they are cornered by a mob, only to be saved when Stephen Hawking shows up. Meanwhile, Homer gets erotic photographs of himself taken for Marge, but while she enjoys them a lot, she gets distracted by the interior design Homer did in their basement for the photo shoot and they do not have sex that night.
226	23	"Thirty Minutes over Tokyo"	Jim Reardon	Donick Cary & Dan Greaney	May 16, 1999	AABF20	12.51 8.0 (HH)
When Snake Jailbird steals money from the Simpson family's bank account through the Internet, the Simpsons go on a budget and save enough to buy a trip to Japan. The Simpsons thoroughly enjoy the country, and Homer defeats one of the mightiest sumo wrestlers. Impressed, the Emperor of Japan congratulates Homer, but, thinking the emperor is a new challenger, Homer knocks him out. As a result, he is placed in prison. After Marge pays the bail, Homer loses the last of their money and the family is unable to buy plane tickets home. All seems lost until a sadistic Japanese game show allows the Simpsons to compete in order to return to Springfield. Their last task on the show is to retrieve the plane tickets on a suspension bridge over an active volcano, which, once the family falls in, is revealed to be filled with orangeade and not lava. Although the family gets the tickets, Homer scolds the Japanese for their lack of ethics, before Godzilla lets go of their plane home and they head back across the ocean to Springfield.

== DVD release ==
The DVD boxset for season ten was released by 20th Century Fox Home Entertainment in the United States and Canada on August 7, 2007, eight years after it had completed broadcast on television. As well as every episode from the season, the DVD release features bonus material including audio commentaries for every episode, deleted scenes, and animatics. The set was released in two different packagings: a standard rectangular cardboard box featuring Bart on the cover driving through a security checkpoint gate at the 20th Century Fox movie studio, and a limited-edition plastic packaging molded to look like Bart's head.

The Complete Tenth Season
Set details			Special features
23 episodes; 4-disc set; 1.33:1 aspect ratio; AUDIO; English 5.1 Dolby Digital; Spanish 2.0 Dolby Surround; French 2.0 Dolby Surround; SUBTITLES; English SDH; Spanish			Optional commentaries for all episodes; Introduction from Matt Groening; Deleted Scenes; The Wizard of Evergreen Terrace; Bart the Mother; When You Dish Upon a Star; D'oh-in' in the Wind; Lisa Gets an "A"; Homer Simpson in: "Kidney Trouble"; Viva Ned Flanders; Wild Barts Can't Be Broken; Sunday, Cruddy Sunday; Homer to the Max; I'm with Cupid; Marge Simpson in: "Screaming Yellow Honkers"; Make Room for Lisa; Maximum Homerdrive; Simpsons Bible Stories; Mom and Pop Art; The Old Man and the "C" Student; Monty Can't Buy Me Love; They Saved Lisa's Brain; Thirty Minutes over Tokyo; Special Language Feature; Sunday, Cruddy Sunday; Czech 2.0 Dolby Surround; Portuguese 2.0 Dolby Surround; Japanese 2.0 Dolby Surround; Ukrainian 2.0 Dolby Surround; Animation showcase; Lard of the Dance; Homer to the Max; Sneak peek at The Simpsons Movie DVD; Commercials; CC's Chips - Fire Walkers; CC's Chips - Magic Show; CC's Chips - Cliffside Beach; CC's Chips - Power Plant; Butterfinger - State Fair; Butterfinger - Tree Branch; Butterfinger - Itchy and Scratchy; Butterfinger - Grandpa Simpson; Butterfinger BB's - ABC Book; Intel - Homer's Smarter Brain; Sketch gallery; Featurette: "The Crank Calls"; Featurette: "A Glimpse Inside"
Release Dates
Region 1	Region 2	Region 4	
August 7, 2007	September 10, 2007	September 26, 2007	
