= I'm with Cupid =

- The Simpsons episode
- Episode no.: Season 10; Episode 14
- Directed by: Bob Anderson
- Written by: Dan Greaney
- Production code: AABF11
- Original air date: February 14, 1999

Guest appearances
- Jan Hooks as Manjula Nahasapeemapetilon; Elton John as himself

Episode features
- Chalkboard gag: "Hillbillies are people too"
- Couch gag: The family have hair transplants: Homer has Maggie's, Marge has Bart's, Bart has Lisa's, Lisa has Homer's and Maggie has Marge's, though it is too heavy for Maggie and she falls over.
- Commentary: Mike Scully; George Meyer; Ian Maxtone-Graham; Ron Hauge; Matt Selman

Episode chronology
← Previous "Homer to the Max"	Next → "Marge Simpson in: 'Screaming Yellow Honkers'"
- The Simpsons season 10

"I'm with Cupid" is the fourteenth episode of the tenth season of the American animated television series The Simpsons. It first aired on Fox in the United States on Valentine's Day, February 14, 1999. The episode takes place on Valentine's Day, and the wives of Springfield are jealous of the attention Apu gives to his wife Manjula. Angered by this, Moe and the Springfield husbands spy on Apu to sabotage his romantic plans.

"I'm with Cupid" was written by Dan Greaney and directed by Bob Anderson. Because the episode was to air on Valentine's Day, Fox wanted the episode to relate to the holiday, although the idea for the episode was pitched by Greaney. The title of the episode is based on the T-shirt slogan "I'm with stupid". Elton John guest-starred as himself, and recorded a new version of his song "Your Song" for the episode. The episode also features references to Breakfast at Tiffany's, Tiffany & Co. and "Lisa the Vegetarian", an earlier episode in the series.

In its original broadcast, "I'm with Cupid" was seen by approximately 7.7 million viewers and finished in 48th place in the ratings the week it aired.

Following the home media release of The Simpsons: The Complete Tenth Season, the episode received generally positive reviews from critics.

== Plot ==
Apu and his new wife Manjula invite Homer and Marge to their house for dinner. However, Apu and Manjula get in a fight, after Marge mentions to Manjula that Apu does not need to work as much as he does. The week before Valentine's Day, Apu tells Homer that he is disappointed that Manjula does not love him, until Homer assures him that Manjula will not leave him before Valentine's Day, and Apu agrees. Apu decides to shower Manjula with many romantic surprises to regain her love. However, although many of Apu's surprises succeed in fixing his marriage, they ruin other people's relationships. The rest of Springfield's women become jealous from all the attention Manjula is receiving, and find their men to be cheapskates (including Maude Flanders). At Moe's Tavern, Homer encourages several of Springfield's men that they have to prevent Apu and Manjula from reconciling to save their own relationships and marriages.

During Valentine's Day, Homer, Chief Wiggum, Dr. Hibbert, Moe, and Ned Flanders investigate what Apu is doing so they can stop it. They go around town following him, and Flanders is thrown out of the group for suggesting they should be using their time to be more romantic to their wives instead of trying to sabotage Apu. Following Apu to the airport, the remaining group see Elton John there, and they think that he came to Springfield to perform a concert for Apu and Manjula at his insistence (in reality, he had to make an emergency landing because the chandelier on his plane was malfunctioning). The group says to John that he won an award for his humanitarian work and then proceed to lock him in a dog carrier. However, Apu's actual plan is that he arranged for a skywriter to write "I ♥ U MANJULA". During the trouble that ensues, Homer jumps on the plane during takeoff to try to stop the skywriter from spraying the message. When Homer destroys the plane's skywriting canister in mid-air, it creates the message "I ♥ U ★", which the other women think is for them. While Homer and the pilot fight, Marge remains unconvinced until the plane flies by and Homer drops out of it covered with roses after the plane flew out of control through a thorny rose patch, possibly giving Homer a collapsed lung, though Marge is overjoyed at Homer's effort. Meanwhile, John performs a private concert for Apu and Manjula, and their marriage is saved. The end credits are red instead of their usual yellow color.

== Production ==
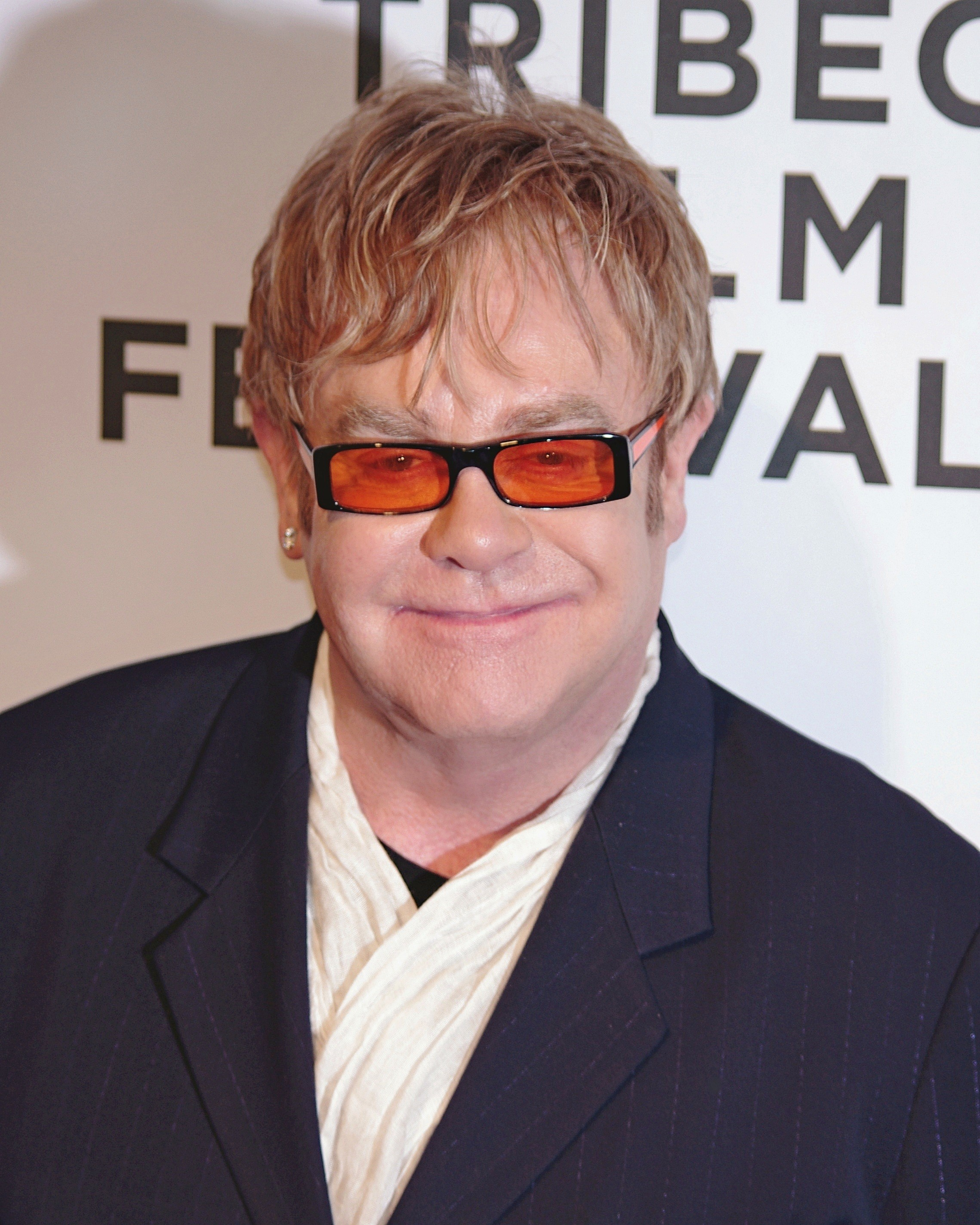
Elton John appeared as himself in the episode

"I'm with Cupid" was written by Dan Greaney and directed by Bob Anderson. It was first broadcast on the Fox network in the United States on Valentine's Day, 1999. Because they knew it would air on Valentine's Day, Fox asked the Simpsons staff to produce an episode related to the holiday. The episode's ending credits were also painted red in honor of the holiday. The idea for the episode was pitched by Greaney, who also wrote the episode's first draft. The episode's title was pitched by fellow Simpsons writer Ron Hauge, who based it on the T-shirt slogan "I'm with stupid". However, Hauge later found out that the title had already been used before for an episode of another television series. However, he did not believe that copyright issues would arise: "It's a very innocent mistake," Hauge said in the DVD commentary for the episode. "It is one of those things that, in the course of a career, you're gonna be on both sides of that, so nobody ever sues on it."

Jan Hooks reprised her role as Manjula in the episode. In a scene in the episode, Apu and Manjula are arguing in Hindi. During the scene, both characters speak the language accurately, as both Hooks and Hank Azaria (the voice of Apu) were given a phonetic transcription of their lines. The singing parrot that Apu sends to Manjula was voiced by series main cast member Nancy Cartwright, who also portrays Bart in the series. The episode features singer Sir Elton John as himself. John's lines were recorded by current showrunner Al Jean, who found working with John being a "wonderful experience". "Elton John was a very nice person," Scully spoke for Jean in the DVD commentary for the episode, since Jean was busy during the commentary record. "He was a great sport and worked really hard for the show." Scully also stated that the re-recording of "Your Song", which appears near the end of the episode, had to be recorded "several times," but that John was "very accommodating" about it.

== Themes and cultural references ==
In their book Picturing South Asian Culture in English: Textual and Visual Representations, Tasleem Shakur and Karen D'Souza analyzed "I'm with Cupid" along with the season 9 episode "The Two Mrs. Nahasapeemapetilons". The two argued that "I'm with Cupid" represents Apu's role in the series, and "reinforces the romanticised view of Apu's marriage through the increasingly elaborate ways in which he expresses his love for his wife." They wrote: "In a Valentine's day episode, the message is clearly critically showing up the all-American men of Springfield for their lack of romance. [...] Throughout this episode, Apu's identity is reinforced as exotic other, but not so much as 'South Asian' other, as an 'American' ideal other, that more wholesome, romantic male juxtaposed to the Duff drinking, couch potato male typified by the men of Moe's bar and Homer Simpson. Again, Apu is not so much represented in his ethnicity, but presented in his critical otherness to both contemporary degenerativeness of American culture, specifically male identities and ironically (re)constructed idea of South Asianness. In these two episodes, the Asian cultural space which Apu, his mother and Manjula perform is a hybrid one, mixing 'Asian' and 'American' values and identities, but critically displacing Asian 'authenticity' and revealing the displacement of contemporary American marriage from its 'authentic' traditions."

In a scene late in the episode, John, having just chewed his way out of a dog carrier, meets Apu, who exclaims "Elton John!", to which John replies "That's my name! Well, not really." The exchange references John's name change, as his birth name was Reginald Dwight. Apu quotes the names of four of John's songs, "Take Me to the Pilot", "Your Song", "Someone Saved My Life Tonight" and "The Bitch is Back". At the end of the episode, John performs a version of "Your Song" for Apu and Manjula on the roof of the Kwik-E-Mart. The scene is a callback to the season 7 episode "Lisa the Vegetarian", in which Paul McCartney performed on the roof. The scene in which Homer is seen jamming Valentine's Day cards into their holders were based on an observation by the writers. Writer George Meyer said of the scene: "You just see cards get really man-handled, and the envelopes get switched with the wrong sizes." In another scene, Marge and Manjula are seen playing badminton. While the scene was conceived in order to provide exposition, the sport was included because badminton is "very popular" in India, according to writer Ian Maxtone-Graham. The episode also mentions the 1961 film Breakfast at Tiffany's. In a scene, Apu, carrying a shopping bag, exits the jewellery and silverware store Tiffany & Co. Meanwhile, Homer, along with Wiggum, Moe, Flanders and Dr. Hibbert are watching Apu, assuming he bought jewellery for Manjula. It is soon revealed that Apu bought a croissant in the store, to which Wiggum says "Oh, that's right, they have breakfast at Tiffany's now." The heart-shaped fade out at the end of the episode is a reference to the series Love, American Style.

== Reception ==
In its original American broadcast on February 14, 1999, "I'm with Cupid" received a 7.7 rating, according to Nielsen Media Research, translating to approximately 7.7 million viewers. The episode finished in 48th place in the ratings for the week of February 8–14, 1999. On August 7, 2007, the episode was released as part of The Simpsons - The Complete Tenth Season DVD box set. Mike Scully, George Meyer, Ian Maxtone-Graham, Ron Hauge and Matt Selman participated in the DVD's audio commentary of the episode.

Following its home video release, "I'm with Cupid" received generally positive reviews from critics.

In 2007, Simon Crerar of The Times listed Elton John's performance as one of the thirty-three funniest cameos in the history of the show.

James Plath of DVD Town wrote that the episode is "funny" because "it has a plot we recognize from our own lives," and Jake McNeill of Digital Entertainment News considered it to be one of the season's best episodes.

Gary Russell and Gareth Roberts, of I Can't Believe It's a Bigger and Better Updated Unofficial Simpsons Guide gave the episode a positive review as well, calling it "Very, very clever and funny," and wrote "it's executed stylishly and Homer wins in the end; entirely by default of course, but maybe that's his reward for not falling off the skywriting plane until the last minute!" However, they also criticized the episode for being "a little tacky," writing "After all, how nice are these people who want to ruin Apu and Manjula's day just because they're scared of looking bad?"

Writing for IGN, Robert Canning described "I'm with Cupid" as "very smart and very funny" and "a great episode representing one piece of Apu's journey." However, he disliked John's guest appearance in the episode, describing it as "completely unnecessary" and "very tacked on," and described John's performance as "very flat." Nevertheless, Canning gave the episode an 8.8 rating and concluded his review by describing it as a "tightly written Valentine's episode."

Giving the episode a more mixed review, Colin Jacobson of DVD Movie Guide criticized it for being too similar to an earlier episode, writing "Didn’t we already see that Flanders makes everyone else look like a jerk on Valentine’s Day? Doesn’t that theme mean that 'Cupid' is somewhat redundant?" He added "Yes that the show lacks any spark, as it throws out a reasonable number of laughs," and concluded his review by writing that "it seems a little stale and not one of the year’s better programs."
