= Lard of the Dance =

- The Simpsons episode
- Episode no.: Season 10; Episode 1
- Directed by: Dominic Polcino
- Written by: Jane C. O'Brien
- Production code: 5F20
- Original air date: August 23, 1998

Guest appearance
- Lisa Kudrow as Alex Whitney

Episode features
- Couch gag: The family goes to sit on the couch, but fall backwards as the couch is pulled out from under them by Nelson Muntz. Nelson exclaims his catchphrase: "Ha-ha!".
- Commentary: Mike Scully; Jane C. O'Brien; Ron Hauge; Pete Michels; Dominic Polcino

Episode chronology
← Previous "Natural Born Kissers"	Next → "The Wizard of Evergreen Terrace"
- The Simpsons season 10

"Lard of the Dance" is the first episode of the tenth season of the American animated television series The Simpsons. It originally aired on Fox in the United States on August 23, 1998. Homer discovers he can make money by stealing and reselling grease, but eventually stops after negative encounters with Groundskeeper Willie and the Springfield Grease Company. Meanwhile, Lisa becomes jealous that new student Alex Whitney (voiced by guest star and Friends actress Lisa Kudrow) is distracting all her friends by using her fashionable personality. The episode was written by Jane C. O'Brien and directed by Dominic Polcino.

== Plot ==
After going back-to-school shopping, Homer Simpson learns from Apu Nahasapeemapetilon that he can sell grease to make a profit. At breakfast, Homer begins frying up various amounts of bacon to use the grease to make money and decides to have Bart help him with his "grease business" and forces Bart to quit school. Meanwhile, on the first day back at school, Lisa volunteers to help Alex Whitney, a fashion conscious new student, by showing her around the school. To help her make new friends, Lisa takes Alex, Sherri, Terri, Allison and Janey for lunch in the cafeteria after the two groups meet up, but shortly afterwards, they abandon Lisa after seeing that Alex owns sophisticated accessories like a cell phone, a purse, and perfume.

Homer and Bart begin their grease business by selling the leftover grease from cooking bacon at home, much to Homer's glee, although Bart points out that they only earned a fraction of what they spent on the bacon. After Homer realizes how large their operation needs to be, the pair later drive to Krusty Burger, where they attempt to steal grease from the fryers. They begin loading the grease into Marge's car but it is then stolen by two employees of the Acne Grease and Shovel Company, who claim a monopoly on the grease and shoveling business in the city.

Alex convinces Principal Skinner to have a school-dance rather than the regular yearly event of apple picking. Skinner agrees, so Alex and Lisa, accompanied by Sherri, Terri, Janey, and Allison, visit the mall to purchase party supplies, but the girls detour and begin trying on outfits for the dance, despite Lisa's protests. The group leaves the mall, none speaking to each other. After failing to get a date to the dance and intimidating Milhouse after he manages to do so, Lisa decides not to attend the dance, but changes her mind and goes to the school to take tickets at the door. She is later forced to enter the dance hall, discovering the boys and girls are standing on different sides of the room, and explains to Alex that it is like this because they are only children, not adults.

Homer and Bart arrive at the school during the school-dance to steal the grease in the school's kitchen which Bart told him about. They sneak inside and plant a hose in the fryer to suck it into the car, but Willie spots them and finds the hose, claiming the grease to be his retirement plan, and attempts to stop them inside the school vents; Willie grabs Homer's leg and strangles him with the hose sucking the grease, which explodes due to the increased pressure, causing the grease to flood into the dance hall. A grease fight begins among the students, where Alex eventually joins in after being told by Lisa to act her own age.

== Production ==
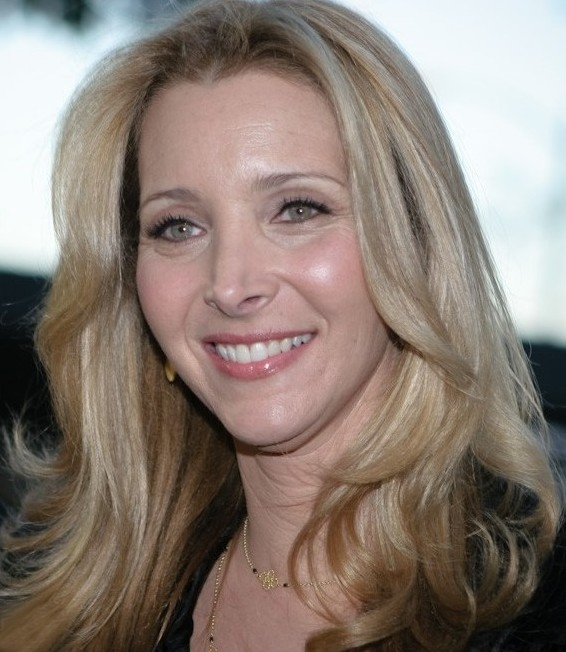
Lisa Kudrow guest starred as Alex

The episode originated from a conversation between writer Jane C. O'Brien and show runner Mike Scully about how girls always want to grow up so fast, as Scully has five daughters. The idea for the subplot came from Jace Richdale, who came up with Homer stealing grease for business, having read about in a magazine. Several aspects of the characters used throughout the episode had been improvised significantly by Lisa Kudrow. Ron Hauge, a writer for The Simpsons, came up with the initial character of Alex, and Jane C. O'Brien named the character after her best friend. The scene showing Homer's hemorrhaged eye as Groundskeeper Willie strangles him got a big laugh in the studio. Mike Scully comments that he now uses it in college clip shows.

== Cultural references ==
The title of the episode is a play on the hymn and later Irish musical Lord of the Dance. Marge sings her own, altered version of the 1990 song "Gonna Make You Sweat (Everybody Dance Now)" when attempting to persuade Lisa to attend the dance. Much of the shop where the girls enter to buy clothes is based on Wet Seal. In the same mall is a party supply store, called Donner's Party Supplies which has a window sign saying "Winter Madness Sale", a reference to the Donner Party. Alex tells Lisa to not be "such a Phoebe", a reference to Lisa Kudrow's character Phoebe Buffay on the series Friends.

== Reception ==
"Lard of the Dance" finished 31st in the weekly ratings for the week of August 17–23, 1998 with a Nielsen rating of 7.2. It was the third highest rated show from the Fox Network that week. The episode aired during the summer so that it could serve as a lead-in for the early premieres of That '70s Show and Holding the Baby. While That '70s Show would receive higher Nielsen ratings than The Simpsons, Holding the Baby was a ratings flop.

In a 2008 article, Entertainment Weekly named Lisa Kudrow's role as Alex as one of the sixteen great guest appearances on The Simpsons. Lisa Kudrow refers to herself in the episode, stating "Your name's Lisa? Shut up, I love that name!"

The authors of the book I Can't Believe It's a Bigger and Better Updated Unofficial Simpsons Guide Warren Martyn and Adrian Wood commented that "The idea of Lisa being unpopular in the light of a new girl in the school hallways is not new (see "Lisa's Rival") but it is done here with such class", concluding of Homer's treatment that "this is an episode which shows that even he can find interesting ways to do things."

Wesley Mead noted, in a review of the tenth season that the episode "might deal with familiar territory ("Lisa's Rival", anyone?), but it doesn't feel like a retread, and is also home to a superbly realised subplot that sees Homer and Bart go into the grease business."

In 2012, The New York Times highlighted this episode in an article about grease theft from restaurants: "An episode of The Simpsons from 1998 has Homer Simpson trying to make a quick buck selling grease, but for years, law enforcement authorities seemed unaware that fryer oil was being stolen by unlicensed haulers, causing millions of dollars' worth of losses each year for the rendering industry that collects and processes the grease."
