= Homer Simpson in: "Kidney Trouble" =

"Homer Simpson in: 'Kidney Trouble'"
- The Simpsons episode
- Episode no.: Season 10; Episode 8
- Directed by: Mike B. Anderson
- Written by: John Swartzwelder
- Production code: AABF04
- Original air date: December 6, 1998

Episode features
- Chalkboard gag: "I am not a licensed hairstylist"
- Couch gag: The Simpsons are frogs, with Maggie as a tadpole.
- Commentary: Matt Groening; Mike Scully; George Meyer; Ian Maxtone-Graham; Ron Hauge; Mike B. Anderson

Episode chronology
← Previous "Lisa Gets an 'A'"	Next → "Mayored to the Mob"
- The Simpsons season 10

"Homer Simpson in: 'Kidney Trouble'", or simply "Kidney Trouble", is the eighth episode of the tenth season of the American animated television series The Simpsons. It first aired on Fox in the United States on December 6, 1998. In the episode Grampa's kidneys explode, leaving him in urgent need of a donor. His son Homer initially agrees to donate one of his kidneys, but after hearing of side effects of only having one kidney, he begins to have second thoughts about the operation.

"Homer Simpson in: 'Kidney Trouble'" was directed by Mike B. Anderson and written by John Swartzwelder, although the episode's premise was pitched by former staff writer George Meyer. Meyer also pitched the sequence involving the "ship of lost souls", which received mixed reactions from The Simpsons staff members. The episode contains references to Night of the Living Dead and North by Northwest.

In its original broadcast, the episode was seen by approximately 7.2 million viewers and finished in 54th place in the ratings the week it aired. Following the release of The Simpsons - The Complete Tenth Season, "Homer Simpson in: 'Kidney Trouble'" received mixed reviews from critics.

== Plot ==
Homer takes the family to a ghost town tourist destination, complaining all the while about how far out of the way it is. Their car breaks down in front of the Springfield Retirement Castle, leading Grampa to wrongly assume they have come to visit him on his birthday: they are subsequently forced to take Grampa with them. Grampa drinks too much sarsaparilla, but Homer refuses to stop to let him use the bathroom, wanting to get home to watch an episode of Inside the Actors Studio featuring F. Murray Abraham. After several hours in the car without stopping, Grampa's kidneys explode.

Dr. Hibbert informs the family that the only way Grampa can be saved is if Homer donates one of his kidneys because Homer is a match for his dad. Homer agrees, to the admiration of his family, but becomes frightened after learning the risks from Moe, and runs away from the surgery room via the window.

Guilt-ridden, Homer deems himself unworthy of living amongst civilized people and decides to start a new life aboard Captain McAllister's ship. He meets several strange people who have their own tales of misery. Homer tells them about abandoning Grandpa, but the others are so disgusted that they throw him off the ship. Homer drifts back to shore, where he witnesses a father and son build a sandcastle and laments his relationship with his own father and children. Homer decides to rectify his mistake and takes off for the hospital.

Homer arrives in time, reconciling with Grampa and apologizing, but panics and flees again at the last minute. His mad dash from the hospital is stopped by an oncoming car carrier, when of its cars slides off and lands on Homer. Homer wakes up in a hospital bed and is greeted by Dr. Hibbert, Marge and the children. Grampa appears in the doorway alive and well, Homer learning that while he was unconscious and being treated for his injuries, the doctors took out one of his kidneys and gave it to Grandpa. Homer is angry at first and vows to get his kidney back as Grandpa mockingly dances his way out of the room, but he settles down after his family tells him he did the right thing for Grampa. They engage in a group hug, and Homer proceeds to give Bart's lower back (where a future donor kidney is located) a long pat. Bart silently realizes what this means as the episode ends.

== Production ==
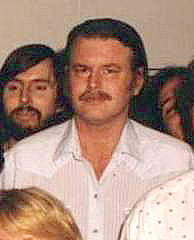
John Swartzwelder wrote the episode.

"Homer Simpson in: 'Kidney Trouble'" was written by John Swartzwelder and directed by Mike B. Anderson. It originally aired on the Fox network in the United States on December 6, 1998. Although it was written by Swartzwelder, the idea for the episode was pitched by former staff writer George Meyer. Nevertheless, the episode still contains several "classic Swartzwelder moments" according to executive producer Ian Maxtone-Graham, including Homer escaping on a handcart and the line "this is everybody's fault but mine". Because the episode contained several scenes of the Simpsons driving, the animators "orchestrated" the scenes by using several different backgrounds. At one point in the episode's setpiece, an arranged gunfight is seen. In the gunfight, there would originally be a man saying "Look, up on the roof, it's a prostitute" and shoot her. Although he thought the gag was funny, Mike Scully, an executive producer and the showrunner for the episode, cut it because the word "prostitute" had already been uttered "at least a dozen times in the episode". According to Scully, the Fox censors objected to showing Grampa giving Homer NyQuil in order to sleep. Scully compromised it by not showing the NyQuil label in the episode. The music that plays during the establishing shot of Springfield Hospital is based on the theme music from Ben Casey, an American medical drama series from the 1960s.

The sequence involving the "Ship of lost souls" was also pitched by Meyer. It was the last part of the episode to be animated, and was completed in one week. The Simpsons staff were split on whether to include the sequence in the episode at all, with series creator Matt Groening being notably hesitant. "I was very worried about that when I saw the script," he said in the DVD commentary for the episode. Meyer was also unsure of the sequence: "You don't see it coming at least," he said, "I don't know if it was totally successful." Scully thought fondly of it, however, calling it "very inspired". The English soldier, the French man, and the Peter Lorre caricature were all portrayed by main cast member Dan Castellaneta, who also plays Homer among other characters in the series. The woman on the ship was voiced by American voice actress Tress MacNeille. Honeybunch, the name of the sea captain's boat, was pitched by Scully's brother Brian Scully. The name came from Scully's father, who used to call his wife Honeybunch as a term of endearment.

The title of the episode is a reference to the 1989 Roger Rabbit cartoon Tummy Trouble. In a scene in the episode, the Simpsons, outside the Springfield Retirement Castle, try to turn on their car, while Grampa is slowly walking towards them. The scene parodies the 1968 film Night of the Living Dead, with Grampa acting as a zombie from the film. The robot cowboy chasing the robot dancer around in a circle on the bar's balcony is a reference to a scene in the original Pirates of the Caribbean ride at Disneyland, where the pirates chased women similarly. The design and voice of the tuxedo-wearing man in the "Ship of lost souls" were based on Hungarian actor Peter Lorre. Also, the bride is loosely based on Miss Havisham from Charles Dickens’ novel Great Expectations. The scene of Homer nearly getting hit by a car during his second escape from the hospital is a reference to a scene in the 1959 Alfred Hitchcock film North by Northwest, in which Cary Grant's character is almost hit by an oncoming truck. American actor Larry Hagman is also mentioned in the episode, when Dr. Hibbert says that Hagman took all the kidneys and livers needed for donors, while Homer states his desire to watch the episode of Inside the Actors Studio featuring F. Murray Abraham. The hospital intercom calls for a "Doc Martens" and a "Dr. Bombay", referring to the British footwear brand and character from the sitcom Bewitched respectively.

== Reception ==
In its original American broadcast on December 6, 1998, "Homer Simpson in: 'Kidney Trouble'" received a 7.2 rating, according to Nielsen Media Research, translating to approximately 7.2 million viewers. The episode finished in 54th place in the ratings for the week of November 22 – December 6, 1998. It tied with a new episode of the ABC program Brother's Keeper. On August 7, 2007, the episode was released as part of The Simpsons - The Complete Tenth Season DVD box set. Matt Groening, Mike Scully, George Meyer, Ian Maxtone-Graham, Ron Hauge and Mike B. Anderson participated in the DVD's audio commentary of the episode.

Following its home video release, "Homer Simpson in: 'Kidney Trouble'" received mixed reviews from critics.

Gary Russell and Gareth Roberts, of I Can't Believe It's a Bigger and Better Updated Unofficial Simpsons Guide called it "An odd episode [...] that goes on a bit too long and could probably have done with an entertaining B story." They added that "Homer's running away is funny the first time, but by the second, it's lost its impact." They concluded by writing that "The biggest joke comes from Grampa's need to go to the lavatory on the way back from the ghost town. Which isn't that funny at all, really."

Movie Guide's Colin Jacobson described the episode as a "snag". He wrote: "'Kidney' offers all the components that should make it good, but it never quite achieves a level higher than average." He added that "Despite a few funny moments, this one largely leaves me cold."

Digital Entertainment News' Jake MacNeill wrote that the episode "runs out of steam" after its first act, and considered it to be one of the season's worst episodes.

However, giving the episode a positive review, Peter Brown of If described "Homer Simpson in: 'Kidney Trouble'" as one of the season's best episodes.

The episode's reference to North By Northwest was named the 24th greatest film reference in the history of the show by Total Film's Nathan Ditum.
