= How the Test Was Won =

- The Simpsons episode
- Episode no.: Season 20; Episode 11
- Directed by: Lance Kramer
- Written by: Michael Price
- Production code: LABF02
- Original air date: March 1, 2009

Episode features
- Chalkboard gag: "March Madness is not an excuse for missing school"
- Couch gag: The Simpsons travel through iconic sitcoms from four different decades (The Honeymooners, The Dick Van Dyke Show, The Brady Bunch, and Cheers) before finally returning to their own living room.

Episode chronology
← Previous "Take My Life, Please"	Next → "No Loan Again, Naturally"
- The Simpsons season 20

"How the Test Was Won" is the eleventh episode of the twentieth season of the American animated television series The Simpsons. It originally aired on the Fox network in the United States on March 1, 2009. It was written by Michael Price and directed by Lance Kramer. The episode features cultural references to the television shows The Honeymooners, The Dick Van Dyke Show, The Brady Bunch, and Cheers, and the film Footloose.

Since airing, the episode received mostly mixed reviews from television critics.

== Plot ==
The episode starts as Marge and Homer celebrate the start of the new year of school (although Bart and Lisa's classes remain the same).

Bart is informed that he received a perfect score on a practice test for the upcoming Vice President's Assessment Test, by writing "Slurp My Snot" across his page. This enables him to attend a pizza party by helicopter. However, it all proves to be a ship-of-fools ruse to purge the school of all low-achievers. Bart actually failed the test, and the helicopter is a disguised school bus. He, Nelson, Ralph, Kearney, Dolph, and Jimbo are driven to Capital City by Otto, along with Principal Skinner, who was tricked on board the bus by Superintendent Chalmers for the same reasons as the other passengers.

On the way, Ralph stops for a bathroom break, and the bus is disassembled and stolen by vandals (while Otto is still sitting in it). The group attempts to walk the rest of the way, but they lose Ralph on a garbage barge. Skinner signals for a slingshot cargo ship to rescue Ralph with its crane, but he accidentally stuns the driver. Skinner rescues Ralph himself by jumping on board the Shipping Container hoisted by the crane and using the law of conservation of angular momentum. Eventually the container rotates into a position that allows Skinner, the boys, and Otto to run along its top and jump onto the barge. As it turns out, the barge is headed towards Springfield Elementary School. The boys now believe that education is impressive due to Skinner's saving the day, and so Skinner reads Adventures of Huckleberry Finn to the boys until they arrive, which they enjoy.

At school, Lisa is unable to focus on the test, as the thought of Bart being smarter torments her. When the test ends, she has not answered a single question, along with the fact that the test is nearly impossible (the choices to a question's answer all mean the same thing, and there is a penalty for guessing). However, Skinner returns just in time to cancel the test and lift the school's "ban on dancing".

Meanwhile, Homer is late making an insurance payment, and will not be insured until 3:00 PM, so he cannot hurt himself until then. Images of injuries flood his mind when he gets home, envisioning Marge's book club being killed by a series of freak accidents (and Marge making out with Lindsey Naegle). He has to keep the entire book club safe while he is still uninsured, but ends up throwing a knife in Mr. Burns' head at 3:01 as he randomly walks onto the Simpsons' property. Marge, however, is pleased to know what Homer can and cannot do.

== Production ==
The clips where Homer remembers when he got hurt are flashbacks from 33 episodes:

- "Homer at the Bat"
- "Bart's Friend Falls in Love"
- "Homer's Triple Bypass"
- "Marge in Chains"
- "Deep Space Homer"
- "Bart Gets an Elephant"
- "Homer Badman"
- "King-Size Homer"
- "Two Bad Neighbors"
- "Homerpalooza"
- "A Milhouse Divided"
- "The Homer They Fall"
- "Homer to the Max"
- "Faith Off"
- "The Computer Wore Menace Shoes"
- "Tennis the Menace"
- "Bye Bye Nerdie"
- "Simpson Safari"
- "Weekend at Burnsie's"
- "I Am Furious (Yellow)"
- "Helter Shelter"
- "Pray Anything"
- "Dude, Where's My Ranch?"
- "Brake My Wife, Please"
- "Marge vs. Singles, Seniors, Childless Couples and Teens, and Gays"
- "Blame It on Lisa"
- "Lost Our Lisa"
- "Lard of the Dance"
- "Trilogy of Error"
- "Million Dollar Abie"
- "He Loves to Fly and He D'ohs"
- "Dumbbell Indemnity"
- "Treehouse of Horror XIII"

When Homer finishes reminiscing, he remarks, "What a week!"

This episode was written by Michael Price, who based it on his experience as a former high school English teacher. In an earlier draft of the third act, Skinner and the boys would learn that the Vice President is in Capital City, and plan to meet him to explain why they missed taking the test.

== Cultural references ==
The episode ends with the characters dancing in the same manner as the characters at the conclusion of the 1984 film Footloose; the scene is also set to Kenny Loggins' titular song from the film. Ralph believes a rat is the character Elmo from PBS's Sesame Street, while Skinner reads the students Mark Twain's The Adventures of Huckleberry Finn. The episode's couch gag includes the family recreating scenes from sitcoms from different decades: The Honeymooners from the 1950s, The Dick Van Dyke Show from the 1960s, The Brady Bunch from the 1970s and Cheers from the 1980s. As an in-joke, Sideshow Bob walks in on the Cheers segment of the gag dressed as Dr. Frasier Crane; both characters are played by Kelsey Grammer.

Homer's premonition of the massive accident in his house is similar to the premonitions seen in the Final Destination franchise.

When Homer realizes that he is uninsured, he exclaims, "I'm not in good hands!" and "Like a bad neighbor, no one is there!", contradictions to the well-known slogans for Allstate and State Farm, respectively.

Otto hums Richard Wagner's Ride of the Valkyries while believing he is flying a helicopter, a reference to the helicopter attack sequence in the 1979 film Apocalypse Now. The "Ode to Joy" segment of Ludwig van Beethoven's Symphony No. 9, Frédéric Chopin's "Fantasie Impromptu 66" and "Gonna Fly Now", the theme from the 1976 film Rocky are both played in the episode, while Ralph sings "Wannabe" by the Spice Girls.

== Reception ==
=== Viewing figures ===
The episode earns a 2.3 rating and was watched by 6.53 million viewers, which was the 43rd most-watched show that week.

=== Critical response ===
Since airing, the episode received mixed reviews from television critics.

Steve Heisler of The A.V. Club wrote: "I'm sorry, but 'How The Test Was Won' was about as low as things get these days—the worst of the season by far, and quite possibly one of the worst episodes I've watched in this brave 'new' era of yellow people." He gave the episode a C−.

Erich Asperschlager of TV Verdict commented: "Despite three strong set-ups and a great first act, the episode barely got off the ground, crash landing long before its what-the-heck Footloose finale. There might have been enough time for Homer hilarity if they hadn’t dedicated so much time to the meandering and ultimately boring story of Skinner trying to keep his dull charges safe after they get stranded in Capital City."

Robert Canning of IGN gave the episode an 8.8/10, calling it "a smart, very funny half hour" and praising the couch gag and Homer's sub-plot but adding that the ending "didn't quite live up to what preceded it". The episode was also named the best of the season by the website.
