= Children of a Lesser God =

Children of a Lesser God may refer to:

- Children of a Lesser God (play), a 1979 play by Mark Medoff
- Children of a Lesser God (film), a 1986 American film
- Children of a Lesser God (album), a 2010 album by Wisemen
- Children of a Lesser God (TV series), a 2018 South Korean television series

== See also ==
- "Children of a Lesser Clod", a 2001 episode of The Simpsons
