= Tales from the Public Domain =

- The Simpsons episode
- Lisa, as Saint Joan of Arc, getting burned at the stake. Executive producer and show runner Al Jean ordered director Mike B. Anderson to "not burn her", even though she is surrounded by flames.
- Episode no.: Season 13; Episode 14
- Directed by: Mike B. Anderson
- Written by: Andrew Kreisberg ("D'oh, Brother Where Art Thou?"); Josh Lieb ("Hot Child in the City"); Matt Warburton ("Do the Bard, Man")
- Production code: DABF08
- Original air date: March 17, 2002

Episode features
- Chalkboard gag: "Vampire is not a career choice"
- Couch gag: The Simpsons rushing to and sitting on the couch is animated in flipbook style, with the pages flipped by real hands.
- Commentary: Al Jean; Matt Selman; Tim Long; John Frink; Don Payne; Joel H. Cohen; Matt Warburton; Mike B. Anderson

Episode chronology
| ← Previous "The Old Man and the Key" | Next → "Blame It on Lisa" |
- The Simpsons season 13

"Tales from the Public Domain" is the fourteenth episode of the thirteenth season of the American animated television series The Simpsons. It originally aired on the Fox network in the United States on March 17, 2002. In this trilogy episode, the first segment, "D'oh, Brother Where Art Thou?" (or "(Annoyed Grunt), Brother Where Art Thou?"), puts Homer Simpson in the role of Odysseus in the ancient Greek epic poem the Odyssey. The second segment, "Hot Child in the City", tells the story of Joan of Arc, and the third and final segment, "Do the Bard, Man", lampoons William Shakespeare's tragedy Hamlet.

This episode was written by Andrew Kreisberg, Josh Lieb and Matt Warburton, and Mike B. Anderson served as the director. Show runner and executive producer Al Jean stated that the episode was "very fun for the writers" to do because it "allow[ed] them to parody great works of literature." On the other hand, Anderson stated that the episode was "much harder" to direct than others because, like with Treehouse of Horror episodes, the animators had to make as many character designs for one act as they would for one normal episode.

In its original American broadcast, the episode was seen by more than 4% of the population between ages 18 and 49. Following its release on DVD and Blu-ray the episode received mixed reviews from critics.

== Plot ==
Homer is told that he has an overdue book from the library which he checked out when Bart was a baby. He says that he had intended to read to Bart every day, but various things had gotten in his way. Before he returns it, he reads from the book, telling three stories.

=== "D'oh, Brother Where Art Thou?" ===
In this story, Homer is Odysseus and delivers the King of Troy (Ned Flanders) a Trojan Horse. He and his crew, including Apu, Lenny, Moe, Professor Frink and Carl, kill all of Troy's citizens and win. However, he refuses to sacrifice a sheep, angering the gods, Zeus (Mayor Quimby), Dionysus (Barney), and Poseidon (Captain Horatio McCallister). Dionysus tries to destroy Odysseus with a lightning bolt, but misses and instead destroys Atlantis as Zeus reprimands him for it. Under Zeus' orders, Poseidon literally blows Odysseus and his crew to the Sirens (Patty and Selma) and visit Circe (Lindsey Naegle), who turns his crew into pigs, whom Odysseus eats. Circe orders Odysseus to go through Hades, crossing the River Styx (which has the Styx song "Lady" playing during the crossing), in order to go home so he can see Penelope (Marge) and Telemachus (Bart). When he arrives back to Ithaca, he spears all of the suitors (Krusty the Klown, Kirk Van Houten, Groundskeeper Willie, Mr. Burns, and Sideshow Mel) trying to please Penelope. Penelope decides to take him back, though he leaves to go to Moe's Tavern (even though Moe was killed and eaten by Odysseus earlier in the episode).

=== "Hot Child in the City" ===
Lisa is Joan of Arc, who leads the French against the English in the Hundred Years' War, which Homer says was also called "Operation Speedy Resolution". Despite her family's concern, she joins the army where she has new ideas about defeating the enemy. She meets the King of France (Milhouse). During a battle, the English capture Joan and put her on trial. She is accused of witchcraft and sentenced to death. When Lisa claims that she was following God's will, Groundskeeper Willie reveals that he too was chosen by God, but to lead the English armies against the French (despite the fact that the Scottish were actually on the French side at the time). God's voice then excuses himself by revealing that the two were never supposed to meet.

As they read the end, Joan of Arc is being burnt at the stake, still waiting for God to save her. Shocked, Lisa asks Homer if she was really burned to death. Marge then interrupts, claiming that Joan of Arc was rescued by Sir Lancelot and they get married and live in a spaceship. She then rips out the last page and eats it, remarking that it is easier to chew than the video of Bambi.

=== "Do the Bard, Man" ===
Bart is Prince Hamlet in this Simpsons version of William Shakespeare's classic. His uncle Claudius (Moe) marries Gertrude (Marge) after killing King Hamlet (Homer) by way of poison. The King returns to his son as a ghost, telling him of the betrayal and requesting that his death be avenged. Prince Hamlet (Bart), with the help of a professional actor (Krusty), puts on a play to make Claudius reveal himself to be guilty; however, Hamlet's reaction leads everyone to believe that he is crazy, so Ophelia (Lisa) decides to "out-crazy" him by prancing around and singing a stupid song, eventually jumping out the window and into the moat where she drowns. Because Hamlet knows what he did, Claudius attempts to kill him. Hamlet, aiming to kill Claudius, accidentally kills Polonius (Chief Wiggum). Polonius implores his son, Laertes (Ralph Wiggum), to avenge his death ("I like revenging!"). Set to duel Hamlet, Laertes accidentally kills himself taking his "practice stab", and Hamlet proceeds to murder Claudius. Rosencrantz and Guildenstern (Carl and Lenny), meanwhile, have been covered in poison and kill each other with a high five. Hamlet walks away to celebrate, but he slips on some blood and dies. Seeing a big mess she does not want to clean up, Gertrude commits suicide by hitting herself in the head with a mace.

=== Epilogue ===
Bart thinks Hamlet was boring despite every character being murdered, but Homer tells him that the story became a great film called Ghostbusters, and all the Simpsons dance to the theme.

== Production ==
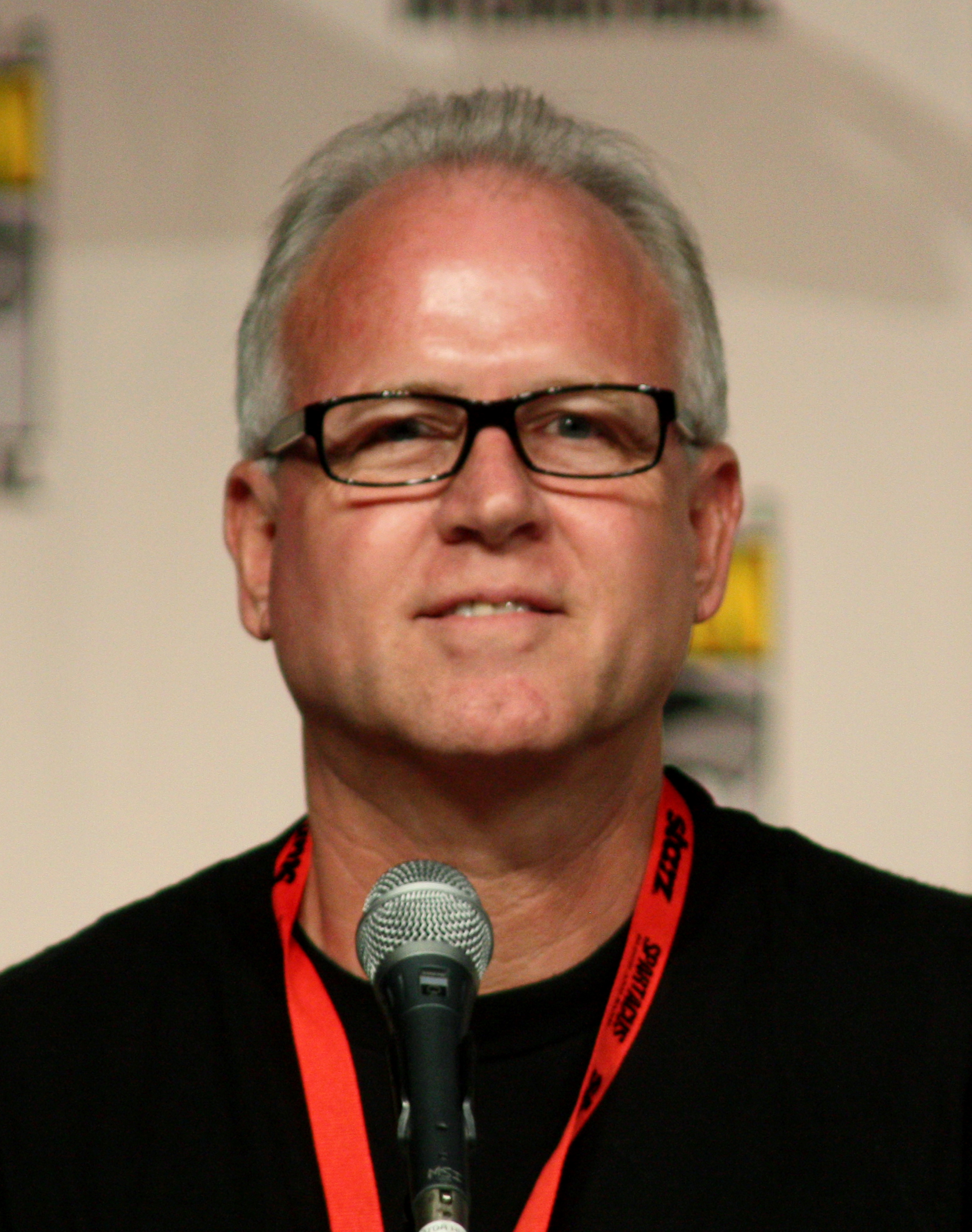
Mike B. Anderson directed the episode.

"Tales from the Public Domain" was directed by Mike B. Anderson and written by Andrew Kreisberg, Josh Lieb and Matt Warburton. It originally aired on March 17, 2002 on the Fox network. "Tales from the Public Domain" is the third trilogy episode produced for the series, the other two being "Simpsons Bible Stories" from season 10, and "Simpsons Tall Tales" from season 12. Al Jean, the show runner for the episode, stated that trilogy episodes are "very fun for the writers" to do because it allows them to parody "great works of literature" and condense them into one act each.

Before writing the episode, the writers had decided that one of the segments would feature Lisa as the main character. According to Jean, the writers found it very difficult to find a historical story for Lisa because there are "so few [historical stories] that star women". They had the same problem when pitching stories for "Simpsons Tall Tales", in which they resorted to giving Lisa the role of "Connie Appleseed", a feminization of the historical figure Johnny Appleseed. The writers eventually settled on Saint Joan of Arc. According to the episode's supervising producer Don Payne, Scottish actor David Tennant watched "Do the Bard, Man" along with the cast of Hamlet during their first rehearsal. The segment has also been used in schools to teach students about Shakespeare's literary work.

In the DVD audio commentary for the episode, Anderson stated that trilogy episodes, like the Treehouse of Horror episodes, are "much harder" to direct than normal ones because the animators have to make as many designs for each act as they would for one normal episode. In the scene in which Joan gets torched by the English, Jean specifically ordered Anderson to "make sure she doesn't get burned", even though she was surrounded by flames. Jean explained in the commentary that, when Mike Scully was show runner for The Simpsons, Jean learned that "people do not wanna see changes in [the characters'] basic design" when the character gets hurt. He added that, because the viewer is "so attached to the characters, [the viewers] don't wanna see... especially Lisa, get hurt in any way." In order to make Homer's ghost in the third segment transparent, the animators had to "double expose" him; Homer's cels were first shot normally and then with a diminished opacity. In the first segment, clouds can be seen moving behind Zeus. The clouds were animated by airbrushing the cels and then moving them slowly in order to make it "look heavenly".

== Cultural references ==
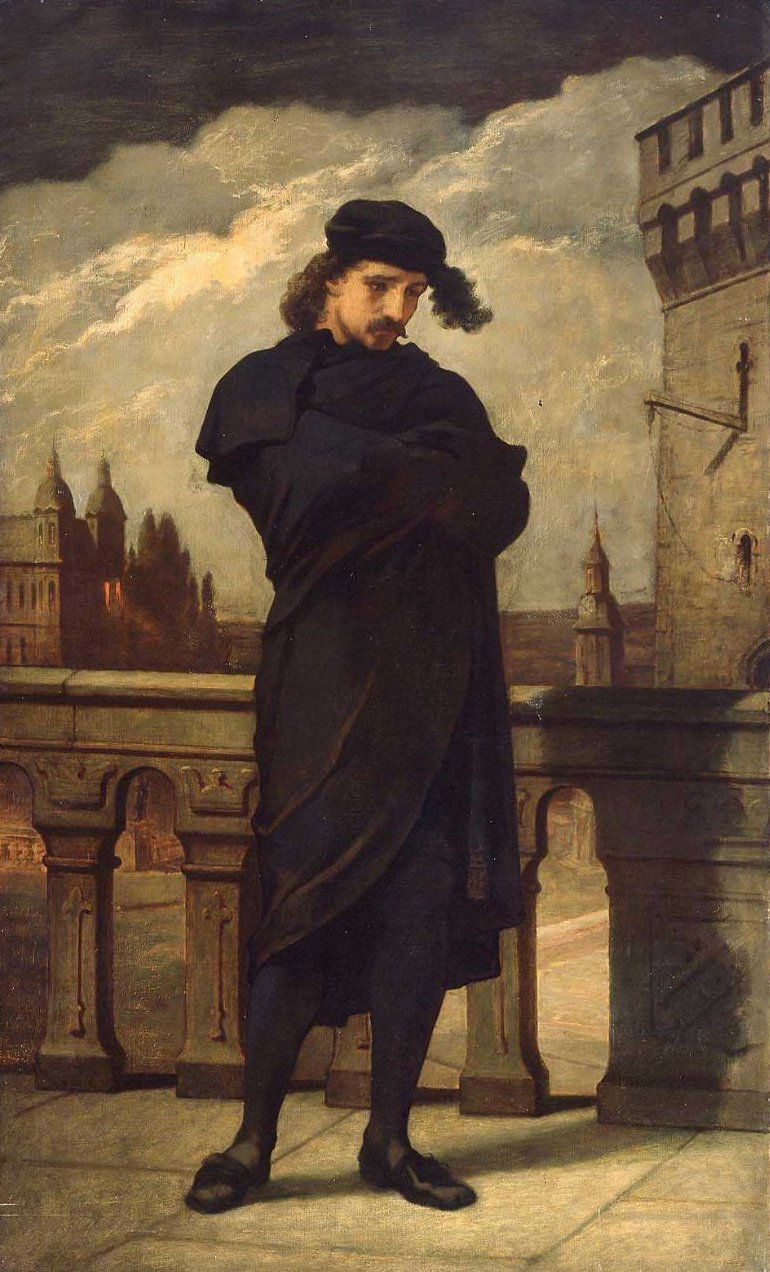
"Do the Bard, Man" bases its story on William Shakespeare's tragedy Hamlet.

Each segment is based on and include references to historical stories; "D'oh Brother, Where Art Thou" takes its story from the ancient Greek epic poem the Odyssey, while taking its name from the movie O Brother, Where Art Thou? (also based on the Odyssey), "Hot Child in the City" is based on the life and legend of Saint Joan of Arc, a French peasant girl who, as a teenager, led the French army to several important victories during the Hundred Years' War. "Do the Bard, Man" spoofs William Shakespeare's tragedy Hamlet.

The song that the sirens are singing in the first segment is a parody on the 1978 disco song "Copacabana" by Barry Manilow. In order to return to Ithaca, Homer crosses the river Styx, in which the dead can be seen dancing "Lady" by the band Styx. In the second segment, the captain resembling Chief Wiggum is initially leading the French army. The soldier resembling Lou points out that the captain "keeps switching back from French and English." The scene satirizes films like Doctor Zhivago in which the Russians speak with a British accent even though they are in Russia. At the end of the act, Marge can be seen eating the page which shows Joan's demise and, say "Well, it's easier to chew than that Bambi video." The scene is a reference to a scene in the Disney film Bambi, in which Bambi's mother is shot to death by hunters.

In the beginning of the third act, Bart argues that modern writers like Steven Bochco, one of the creators of the television series NYPD Blue, are more talented than Shakespeare. Bochco saw the episode with his children and was so flattered that he sent The Simpsons staff some NYPD Blue merchandise. After the ghost of Homer has spoken to Bart, he leaves Bart's room by flying through the wall, causing slime to appear on the wall. This is a reference to Slimer, a ghost from the Ghostbusters franchise who has a similar function.

== Release ==
In its original American broadcast on March 17, 2002, "Tales from the Public Domain", along with a new episode of Malcolm in the Middle, received more than a full rating point more than ABC's showing of the film Snow White: The Fairest of Them All, which received a 3.1 rating among adults between ages 18 and 49, according to Nielsen Media Research. This means that the episode was watched by more than 4% of the American population of said demographic at the time of its broadcast. On August 24, 2010, the episode was released as part of The Simpsons: The Complete Thirteenth Season on DVD and Blu-ray.

These anthology shows tend to be pretty spotty. The series usually pulls of [sic] the Halloween ones relatively well, but the others are much more hit or miss. "Hamlet" probably comes across the best, but it’s still pretty mediocre.

— Colin Jacobsson, DVD Movie Guide

Following the release of The Simpsons thirteenth season, "Tales from the Public Domain" received mixed reviews from critics. Colin Jacobsson of DVD Movie Guide wrote that The Simpsons trilogy episodes "tend to be pretty spotty." Of the three stories, Jacobsson liked "Do the Bard, Man" the most, although he overall found the episode to be "mediocre". Adam Rayner of Obsessed with Film wrote that, even though the episode "has a few laughs", it "just feels half-hearted", and, writing for 411Mania, Ron Martin described the episode as being "just a lazy way out for the writers". Giving the episode a negative review, Nate Boss of Project:Blu wrote that the episode is "awful" and "kinda annoying", and that it "has been done so many times, it's hardly all that funny". On the other hand, Casey Broadwater of Blu-ray.com wrote that he is "particularly fond of [the episode]" and Rosie Fletcher of Total Film considered it to be a "stand-out" episode in the season. The Vulture column of New York magazine named it one of the ten best episodes of the show's later era.

== See also ==
- Simpsons Bible Stories
