= Simpsons Bible Stories =

- The Simpsons episode
- Episode no.: Season 10; Episode 18
- Directed by: Nancy Kruse
- Written by: Tim Long; Larry Doyle; Matt Selman
- Production code: AABF14
- Original air date: April 4, 1999

Episode features
- Chalkboard gag: (first) "I cannot absolve sins"/(second) "I will not deface" (in hieroglyphics)
- Couch gag: The family run in and slip up on banana peels.
- Commentary: Matt Groening; Mike Scully; George Meyer; Tom Martin; Larry Doyle; Matt Selman; Nancy Kruse

Episode chronology
← Previous "Maximum Homerdrive"	Next → "Mom and Pop Art"
- The Simpsons season 10

"Simpsons Bible Stories" is the eighteenth episode of the tenth season of the American animated television series The Simpsons. It first aired on Fox in the United States on Easter Sunday, April 4, 1999. It is the first of The Simpsons' now annual trilogy episodes, and consists of four self-contained segments. (Note: Although the episode consists of four segments, executive producer and former showrunner Mike Scully stated that it was the first official trilogy episode in its commentary.) In the episode, the Simpson family falls asleep during a sermon in church. Marge dreams that she and Homer are Adam and Eve in the Garden of Eden, Lisa dreams that she and her fellow Springfield Elementary School students are Hebrew slaves in Ancient Egypt and guides Moses to lead them to freedom, Homer dreams that he is King Solomon called to resolve a dispute between Lenny and Carl over the ownership of a pie, and Bart dreams he is King David, who has to fight Goliath's son, Goliath II.

"Simpsons Bible Stories" was written by Matt Selman, Larry Doyle and Tim Long, and was the first episode Nancy Kruse directed for The Simpsons. While executive producer and former showrunner Mike Scully stated that the idea for the episode came after Fox requested an Easter-themed episode, co-writer Selman argued that it was conceived by former staff writers Dan Greaney and Donick Cary while they were pitching ideas for the tenth season. Because the episode mostly takes place outside Springfield, the animators had to design completely new sets. While the episode mostly features references to the Old Testament and Christianity, it also parodies children's television programs, American politicians and action films by Jerry Bruckheimer.

In its original broadcast, the episode was seen by approximately 12.2 million viewers, Following its broadcast, the episode received mixed reviews from critics, but won an Annie award in the category of Best Animated Television Production.

In 2007, the episode was released as part of The Simpsons - The Complete Tenth Season DVD box set, and a promotional poster for the episode was included in an exhibition in Sherwin Miller Museum of Jewish Art in Tulsa, Oklahoma. The episode's ending scene is one of series creator Matt Groening's favorite moments on The Simpsons. The episode has been credited with fostering a critical literacy towards religion and the Bible among its viewers.

== Plot ==
It is an unseasonably hot Easter at church, and no one is interested in Reverend Lovejoy's sermons. When the collection plate is passed around, Homer puts in a chocolate Easter bunny that he found in the dumpster, enraging Reverend Lovejoy, calling it a wicked idol, and provoking him to read the Bible from the beginning. The Simpsons all fall asleep.

=== Marge's dream ===
Marge dreams that she and Homer are Adam and Eve. They peacefully live in the Garden of Eden until a snake (Snake Jailbird) tempts Adam into eating dozens of apples from the forbidden tree. He persuades Eve to try one when God (Ned Flanders) witnesses his sin. Even though Adam ate many apples, God only caught Eve eating an apple, and she is therefore banished from the Garden of Eden. Adam is unwilling to come clean, but misses Eve and thinks of a way of getting her back in by digging a tunnel with the help of some of the animals. God's unicorn, named Gary, becomes exhausted from the digging and dies just before God catches Adam trying to smuggle Eve back into the Garden. The death of the unicorn enrages him further, and he expels them both from the Garden of Eden.

=== Lisa's dream ===
Lisa imagines she and all the other Springfield Elementary students are Hebrews in ancient Egypt, with the Pharaoh (Principal Skinner) making them build a pyramid. Only Moses (Milhouse) can liberate the Hebrews. When Bart defaces the Pharaoh's sarcophagus, supposedly incited by the burning bush, he gets the other students punished. Lisa and Moses ask Skinner to let the Hebrews go but they are rejected when he shouts "You call yourselves slaves!" To radicalize their request for freedom, Lisa helps Moses produce plagues to scare the Pharaoh into freeing the Israelites, but they fail. This in turn gets Lisa and Moses thrown in the Pyramid's booby traps. When they escape, Moses gathers all the students and they attempt to leave. After a brief moment of thinking about allowing the Hebrews to go free, Skinner shouts "After them!". When they reach the sea, Lisa has an idea to get across: They simultaneously flush all the Egyptians' toilets to drain the sea. As they cross, the Pharaoh and his guards follow them into the "temporarily dry sea", but the water fills the sea back up and swallows them. They enjoy splashing each other, and then return to the shore. Pleased that they have escaped, Moses asks Lisa what the future holds for the Israelites, but Lisa disappoints Moses when she says that they have to wander the desert for forty years. Moses then asks if it is going to be smooth sailing for the Jews after that. Rather than disappoint Moses again with news of the ongoing anti-Semitism that will plague the Jews for many centuries, she distracts the crowd by sending them to search for manna.

=== Homer's dream ===
Homer pictures himself as King Solomon. Lenny and Carl fight over ownership of a pie. Solomon cuts it in half, sentences Lenny and Carl to death, and then eats the pie, before presiding over a civil case between Jesus and Checker Chariot.

=== Bart's dream ===
Bart sees himself as King David, who kills Goliath, but has not won the war yet: Nelson is Goliath's son, Goliath II, who has killed Methuselah (Grampa), David's oldest friend in revenge. In retaliation, David challenges Goliath II, but having no stones to sling at him, David loses and is catapulted from the city, but not before cutting Goliath II's hair (as David got him confused with Samson). David then meets Ralph, a shepherd, who claims he can kill Goliath II. After Ralph is presumed dead, David then trains with Ralph's sheep to try to slay Goliath II. Having to climb up the enormous Tower of Babel beforehand (not before finding the remains of Jonah within the remains of the whale that ate him, which was eaten by Goliath II), David manages to subdue Goliath II by throwing a lit lantern down his throat. Goliath II is surprisingly still alive, but is quickly killed by Ralph's gravestone, hurled by Ralph himself, who also survived. Much to his shock, David is sent to jail as the townspeople claim that Goliath II was the best king they ever had, building roads, libraries and hospitals.

=== Epilogue ===
As the family wakes up, they find themselves alone in the church. Upon exiting they realize that the Last Judgement has come; fire rains from a red sky, and the Four Horsemen ride past. The Flanders ascend into Heaven, but the Simpsons do not; Lisa begins to ascend, but Homer grabs her leg and pulls her back down. Instead, the Simpsons descend via a staircase into Hell, where Homer follows the delicious scent of grilling only to be horrified by the lack of hot dogs and unappetizing dishes as "Highway to Hell" by AC/DC plays over the credits.

== Production ==
"Simpsons Bible Stories" was co-written by Matt Selman, Larry Doyle and Tim Long, and was the first episode Nancy Kruse directed for The Simpsons. It was first broadcast on the Fox network in the United States on April 4, 1999, the day Easter took place that year. According to executive producer and former showrunner Mike Scully, the idea for the episode was conceived when Fox requested an Easter-themed Simpsons episode that would air on the holiday. Normally, Fox would not broadcast any new Simpsons episodes on Easter, as it is considered a "low-ratings night", but "Simpsons Bible Stories" was an exception. However, according to co-writer Selman, the idea for the episode came about when he and former staff writer Dan Greaney were pitching episode ideas for the tenth season with former staff writer Donick Cary. Cary and Greaney suggested a "Bible-trilogy" story, which then became "Simpsons Bible Stories". "Simpsons Bible Stories" is the first of the trilogy episodes which, since the season 12 episode "Simpsons Tall Tales", The Simpsons produces once every season.

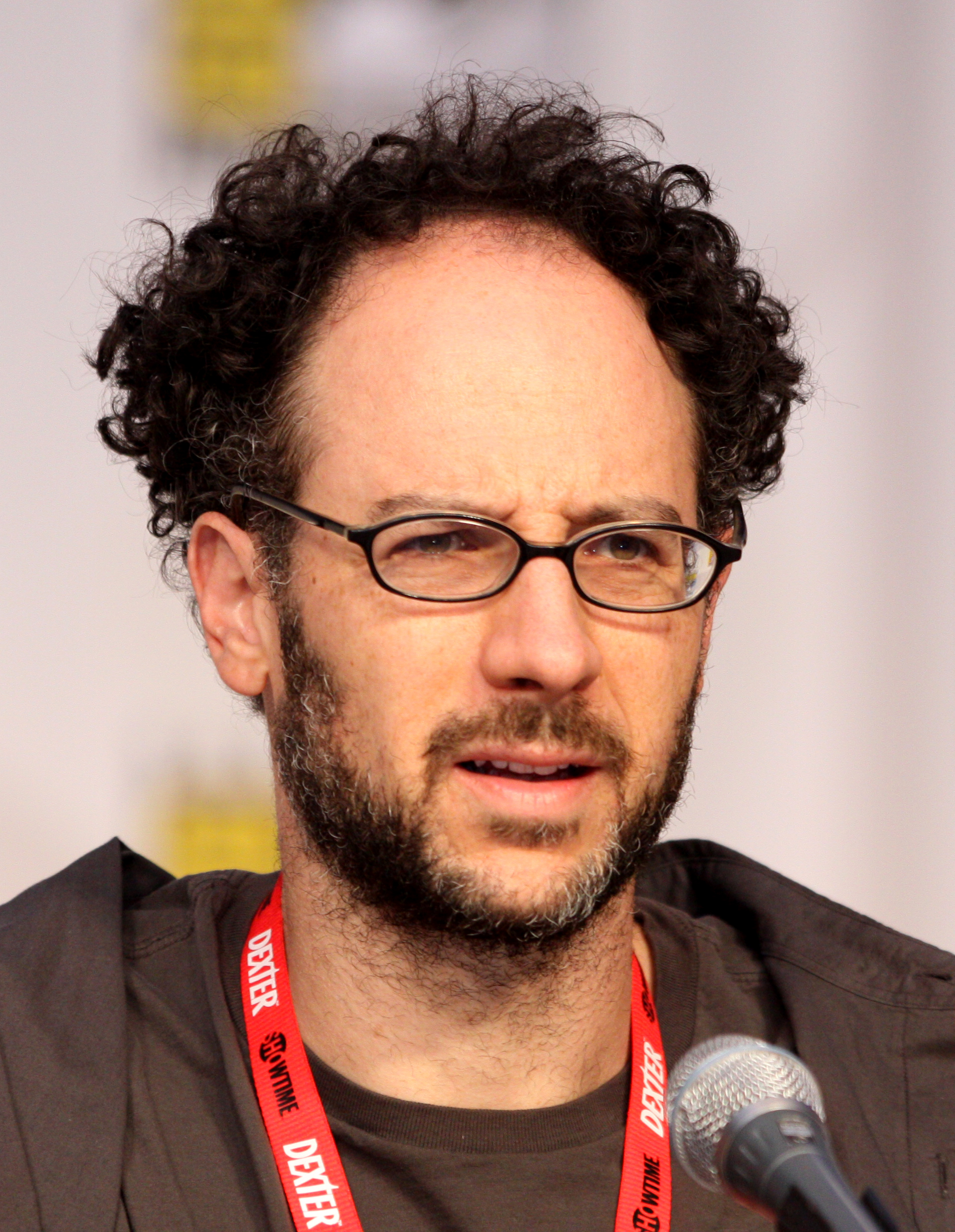
Matt Selman wrote the episode together with Tim Long and Larry Doyle.

The first segment was written by Long. According to former staff writer Tom Martin, Long wanted the pig in the garden of Eden to have a "Tony British" accent. The pig was voiced by regular cast member Hank Azaria, who portrays Moe Szyslak among other characters in the series. The unicorn that digs a hole from the Garden of Eden was portrayed by Tress MacNeille. The second segment was written by Doyle. The episode's third segment was written by Selman. When writing segments for trilogy episodes, the writing staff usually follow the stories they are based on, while putting The Simpsons characters in the original characters' place. With "Simpsons Bible Stories"' third segment, Selman stated that he wanted to go a "fresh new way" by instead writing a sequel to the story of David and Goliath. According to Scully, Selman had a very clear vision of how he wanted the segment to be, and Selman said that he wanted to make a "dog's breakfast" of movie clichés at the time.

The song that plays during Bart's training montage is "Winner Takes It All" by American rock singer Sammy Hagar. Selman decided to include the song after hearing it in the 1987 action drama film Over the Top. According to Doyle, the scene was originally much longer, almost seven minutes in length. The song that plays during the episode's end credits is "Highway to Hell" by Australian hard rock band AC/DC. According to Scully, the staff could not use the song on The Simpsons at first, since AC/DC's record company refused to sell it. However, when Scully called the band's manager directly, it turned out he had not been told about the request. Scully said that when they asked if they could use "Highway to Hell", the band's manager "signed on right away" and gave The Simpsons staff a "huge discount."

Because most of the episode takes place in ancient history, the animators had to create completely new sets and designs for the episode. In the DVD commentary for the episode, Kruse stated that she and staff animator Alex Ruiz had to re-draw a majority of the episode, as the faulty scenes were drawn by six trainees. In order to receive an animator credit on The Simpsons, an animator has to draw ten scenes in an episode. Because the trainees did not draw ten scenes each, none of them were credited for their work on the episode. All the trainees were later hired to The Simpsons animation staff. Kruse stated that, while animating the episode, she was worried that the animation department would be offended by the episode's content, as many of the crew members were "very religious". However, as animation ensued, she found that most of the animators were not uncomfortable with the episode, as it mostly parodies the Old Testament. The only complaint she received was from an animator who refused to animate Jesus in the court room scene in Homer's dream.

In the DVD commentary for the episode, Scully stated that he regretted not submitting "Simpsons Bible Stories" for the Primetime Emmy Award in the category of animated programming less than one hour in 1999. At the time, Scully reasoned that, because the original stories were not conceived by the writing staff, the episode would not hold up. However, he noted that the episode's animation was "outstanding", and that he later found out that the Emmy awards "put a lot of importance on" the animation in submitted episodes. Instead of submitting "Simpsons Bible Stories" for the Emmy awards in 1999, Scully submitted "Viva Ned Flanders", which ultimately lost to the King of the Hill episode "And They Call It Bobby Love".

== Cultural references ==
"Simpsons Bible Stories" contains several references to the Hebrew prophets, holy book, and the religion as a whole, as well as films based on the Bible. Each segment is based on a biblical story, mostly from the Old Testament. The first segment is based on the story of Adam and Eve, who, according to the Book of Genesis were the first man and woman created by God. Ned Flanders has the role of God, while the serpent that lures Marge into eating an apple from the forbidden tree resembles Snake Jailbird. The Garden of Eden was the place where Adam and Eve lived after they were created by God, according to the Book of Genesis.

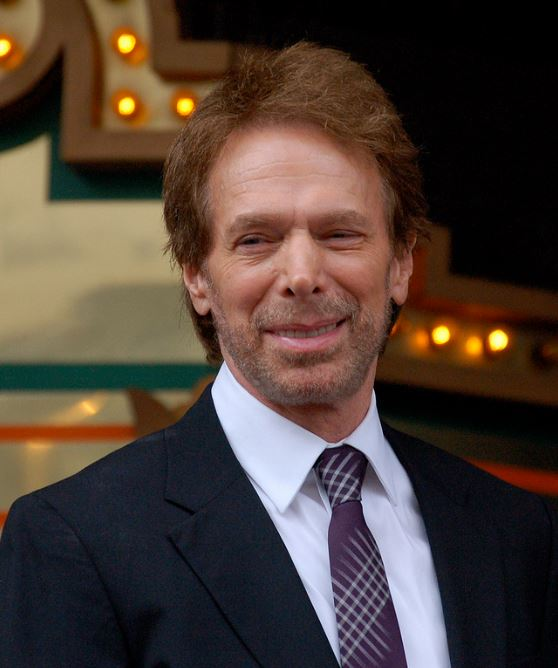
Bart's dream contains references to several action films, including those produced by Jerry Bruckheimer.

The second segment parodies Moses who, according to the Book of Exodus, freed the Israelites from the Egyptian Pharaoh. Milhouse has the role of Moses while Skinner has the role of the Pharaoh. When the Pharaoh asked who vandalized his sarcophagus, the burning bush tells him that Bart did it. When Bart is seized by the Pharaoh's guards, he exclaims "No, the bush set me up!" Bart's line refers to the 1990 arrest of Marion Barry who, while being arrested by the FBI for smoking crack cocaine, exclaimed "No, the bitch set me up!" In a scene in the segment, Milhouse and Lisa can be seen pouring frogs into Skinner's tent. The scene refers to the second of ten Biblical plagues that were imposed on Egypt by God, in chapters 7-12 of the Book of Exodus. While they are inside the torture chamber, Milhouse and Lisa walk past an orb. The orb is called "Orb of Isis" and played a big part in the season 9 episode "Lost Our Lisa". In another scene, Milhouse parts the Red Sea so that his fellow slaves can escape. The execution of the scene is based on the one seen in the 1956 American epic film The Ten Commandments, in which Moses parts the Red Sea. The shot in which Pharaoh and his guards are drowning is also taken from the movie.

In Homer's dream, Homer has the role of King Solomon who, according to the Books of Kings and Book of Chronicles was a King of Israel, as well as one of the 48 prophets according to the Talmud. Bart's dream shows Bart as King David and, rather than telling the story of David and Goliath, Bart's dream is a "sequel" to the story. The segment is inspired by and contains references to several films by Jerry Bruckheimer, including Die Hard and Lethal Weapon, and borrows elements from other action films. At one point in the segment, Bart's dog Santa's Little Helper starts talking to him. The dog's voice is similar to that of Goliath in the stop-motion animated television series Davey and Goliath. Inside the whale skeleton in the episode, Bart finds the remains of Jonah. Jonah was a prophet of the northern kingdom of Israel, according to the Hebrew Bible. Nelson lives in the Tower of Babel which, according to the Book of Genesis, was an enormous tower that the humans built in order to reach heaven. After being defeated by Bart, Nelson reappears while a variation of Modest Mussorgsky's composition St. John's Night on the Bare Mountain plays in the background. At the end of the segment, Bart is arrested and Chief Wiggum says "Where's your messiah now?" Wiggum's line was also taken from The Ten Commandments, from a character played by Edward G. Robinson, on whom Wiggum's voice is based. King David's (Bart) training montage of arm-wrestling with his sheep is a reference to the film Over the Top, complete with Sammy Hagar's "Winner Takes It All" from the film.

== Release and reception ==
In its original American broadcast on April 4, 1999, "Simpsons Bible Stories" received a 7.4 Nielsen rating, translating to approximately 7.4 million viewers. The rating is based on the number of household televisions that were tuned into the show, but Nielsen Media Research estimated that 12.2 million viewers watched the episode, a considerable drop from the previous episode, which was seen by an estimated 15.5 million viewers. David Bianculli of New York Daily News attributed the loss in viewership to the fact that the episode aired on a religious holiday. Nevertheless, it was the week's second most watched program on the network.

Later that year, the episode received an Annie award in the category of Best Animated Television Production, the second year in a row that The Simpsons won the award.

On August 7, 2007, "Simpsons Bible Stories" was released as part of The Simpsons - The Complete Tenth Season DVD box set. Matt Groening, Mike Scully, George Meyer, Tom Martin, Larry Doyle, Matt Selman and Nancy Kruse participated in the DVD's audio commentary of the episode.

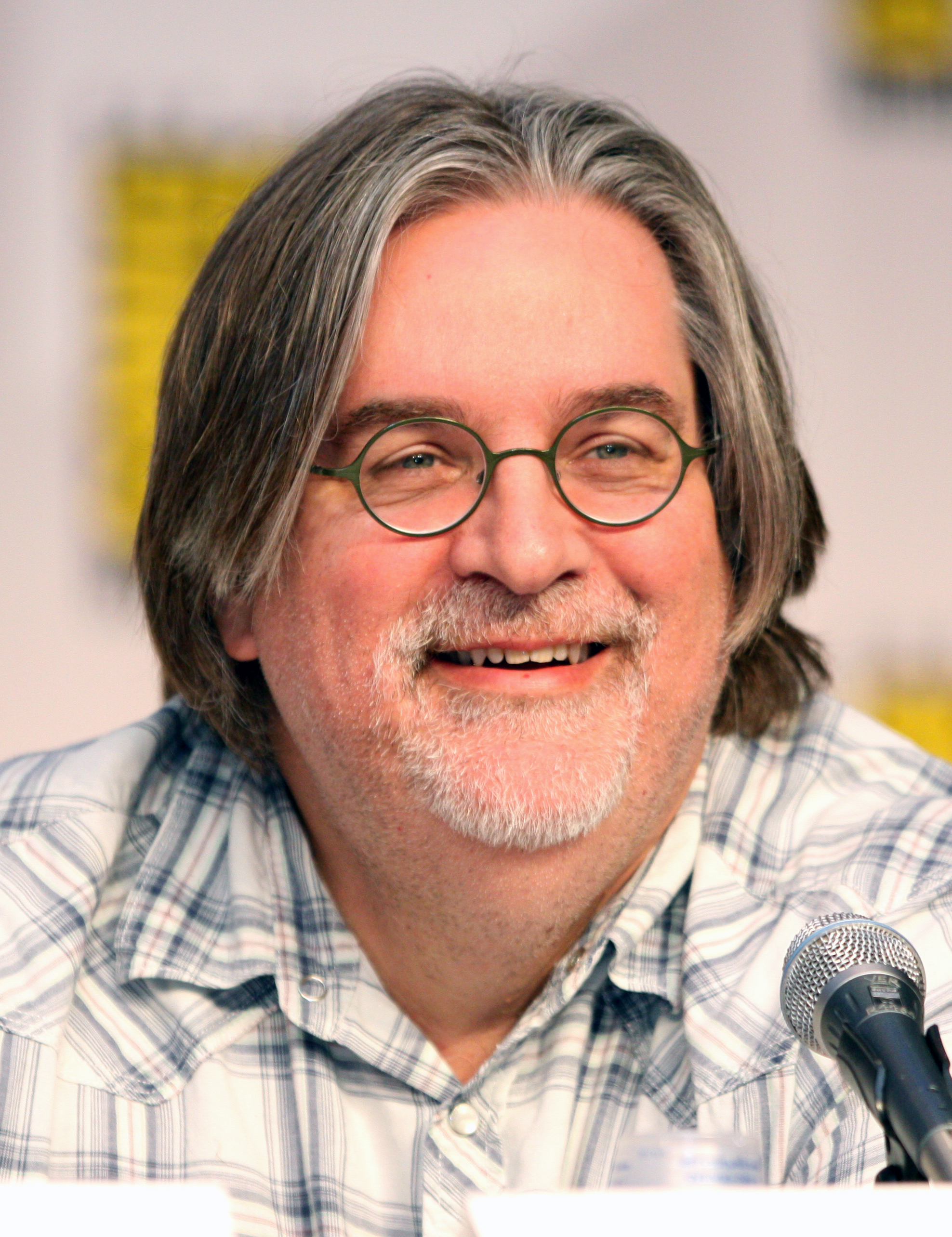
Although it is one of series creator Matt Groening's favorite moments in The Simpsons, fans of the series were uneasy about the episode's ending.

Following its broadcast, "Simpsons Bible Stories" received mixed reviews from critics. Warren Martyn and Adrian Wood of I Can't Believe It's a Bigger and Better Updated Unofficial Simpsons Guide wrote that the episode is "A fantastic twist of the Treehouse of Horror style of storytelling," and added that each segment is a "classic on its own". They wrote that Wiggum telling Moses and Lisa to give his regards to the British Museum as he seals them inside a tomb and Marge asking Bart if he is wearing clean underwear as they face the apocalypse were some of the episode's "best moments", and concluded by writing that the episode is "The Simpsons at its very best: inventive, irreverent and very, very funny."

While DVD Town's James Plath wrote that the episode's premise was "risky", he still enjoyed the episode.

Alan Sepinwall and Matt Zoller Seitz of The Star-Ledger described the episode as "hilarious", however they noted that the episode's "suggestion that Moses parted the Red Sea by having all the Israelites flush their toilets at once" could result in a backlash from the "religious right".

On the other hand, giving the episode a negative review, DVD Movie Guide's Colin Jacobson wrote that "Simpsons Bible Stories" "proves less successful [than most Treehouse of Horror episodes]". He added that he "just think the brevity required by the inclusion of three separate tales better suits the world of horror spoofs than it does these Bible pieces," as they "try to pack an awful lot into very little time." He concluded by writing that, while the episode has "some good moments", he did not find a lot of entertainment in it.

Aaron Roxby of Collider described "Simpsons Bible Stories" as his least-favorite trilogy episode, and wrote "Considering that, in earlier seasons, the show had some of the most thoughtfully edgy religious humor on television, this one feels surprisingly toothless." However, he gave praise to the talking pig in the Garden of Eden.

At the end of the episode, the Simpsons walk out of the church and notice that the Apocalypse has begun. While the other family members are left on earth, Lisa at first starts ascending into Heaven, but Homer stops her by grabbing her leg and says "Where do you think you're going, missy?" The gag was written by staff writer George Meyer, and is series creator Matt Groening's favorite joke of the series. While the episode's ending is one of Groening's favorites, fans were uneasy with it. Selman stated that the ending "drives them [the fans] crazy", since they do not know whether or not the episode is canonical.

In 2007, Homer's line "Oh, I smell barbeque!" was included in Bobby Bryant of The State's list "20 Essential Things I've Learned From Homer Simpson".

The same year, the Sherwin Miller Museum of Jewish Art in Tulsa, Oklahoma, unveiled a new exhibit which galleried Biblical images in art and pop culture, including a promotional poster for "Simpsons Bible Stories".

== See also ==
- List of Easter television episodes
- Tales from the Public Domain
