= Maximum Homerdrive =

- The Simpsons episode
- Episode no.: Season 10; Episode 17
- Directed by: Swinton Scott
- Written by: John Swartzwelder
- Production code: AABF13
- Original air date: March 28, 1999

Episode features
- Chalkboard gag: "It does not suck to be you"
- Couch gag: The Simpsons have been reversed so that Bart and Lisa are adults with Homer and Marge as kids. Maggie is turned into a doll which Homer holds.
- Commentary: Matt Groening; Mike Scully; George Meyer; Ian Maxtone-Graham; Ron Hauge; Matt Selman; Swinton O. Scott III; Mike B. Anderson

Episode chronology
← Previous "Make Room for Lisa"	Next → "Simpsons Bible Stories"
- The Simpsons season 10

"Maximum Homerdrive" is the seventeenth episode of the tenth season of the American animated television series The Simpsons. It first aired on Fox in the United States on March 28, 1999.

"Maximum Homerdrive" was written by John Swartzwelder and directed by Swinton O. Scott III. Although the episode's first draft was written by Swartzwelder, the writing staff was split into two groups in order to focus on both the A-story and the B-story. The episode features references to comedian Tony Randall, model Bettie Page, and science fiction film 2001: A Space Odyssey, among other things. In its original broadcast, the episode received a 7.8 Nielsen rating among adults between ages 18 and 49, the highest such rating for the series since "Wild Barts Can't Be Broken". The ratings boost was credited by Variety to the first episode of Futurama, which premiered after this episode. In the years since, it has received mixed reviews from critics.

== Plot ==
The Simpsons go out to dinner at a new steakhouse, "The Slaughter House", whose existence Lisa is protesting. Homer brings the family, and stumbles upon the "Sir Loin-a-Lot" challenge and accepts an offer from truck driver Red Barclay to see who can finish the entire 16-pound sirloin steak first. Homer does not manage to finish it and Red wins the challenge but immediately dies from beef poisoning, as diagnosed by Dr. Hibbert. Homer decides to finish Red's last delivery and brings Bart along with him.

Homer and Bart travel leisurely during the trip, stopping at many roadside attractions en route. After Bart points out they have to travel hundreds of miles in less than a day, Homer tries to make up for lost time by taking a combination of soon-to-be outlawed pep pills and sleeping pills that he bought at a general store, but ends up falling asleep at the wheel. He awakes to discover that the truck has piloted itself safely to a gas station due to an onboard automated driving system. Other truck drivers at the station also have the system installed and warn Homer not to reveal its existence, as it would put all truckers out of work. However, whilst showing off the system to Bart, Homer tells a busload of people about the device and incurs the wrath of a mob of truckers. Although the system ejects itself from Homer's truck in response to his reckless driving, he and Bart manage to escape from the mob and deliver the shipment (artichokes and migrant workers) to Atlanta on time. They then volunteer to drive a trainload of napalm to Springfield so they can get home. The other truckers briefly considered relying on their own skills to drive but instead decided to devise a different money-making scheme.

Meanwhile, back in Springfield, Marge decides to have an adventure of her own and takes Lisa on a trip to buy a new doorbell for the house. They choose one that plays a snippet of "(They Long to Be) Close to You" and install it, but Marge is dismayed when no one comes to ring it. Marge tries all sorts of methods to get someone to ring the bell, but to no avail. Lisa loses her patience and rings the bell, causing it to malfunction and repeatedly play the tune. When Marge pulls out one of the wires in an attempt to shut it off, it instead plays faster and louder and disturbs the neighbors. The doorbell store's mascot, Señor Ding-Dong, appears and silences the bell with one crack of his whip; when he tries to leave, though, his van will not start.

== Production ==
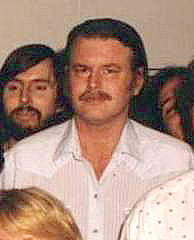
John Swartzwelder wrote the episode.

"Maximum Homerdrive", originally called "Homer the Trucker", was written by staff writer John Swartzwelder and directed by Simpsons director Swinton O. Scott III. It originally aired on the Fox network in the United States on March 28, 1999. The meat-eating contest seen in the beginning of the episode was conceived by Simpsons writer Donick Cary during a story pitch-out, according to writer and executive producer Matt Selman. When rewriting the episode, the writing staff was divided into two groups, so that one group wrote the A-story, while the other wrote the B-story. After the second act, the writers were "stuck", as executive producer and former showrunner Mike Scully recalled in the DVD commentary for the episode. Eventually, staff writer and co-executive producer George Meyer pitched the idea that the truckers would have "a secret device, that actually did all the driving for them", called the Navitron Autodrive System.

In order to animate Barclay's truck in "Maximum Homerdrive", Scott bought a model truck, on which he also based the design of Barclay's truck. According to storyboard consultant Mike B. Anderson, the trucks in the episode were very difficult to animate, as the Simpsons animators were still working with traditional cel animation at the time and did not have access to computer tools. In a scene in The Slaughterhouse, an employee is shown killing a number of cows with a captive bolt pistol, however the death of the cows are not shown. Originally, the writers wanted to show the cows being killed, however when Scott saw the scene in the storyboards, the Simpsons staff instead decided to make the deaths "indirect". During the meat eating contest, Homer becomes exhausted and sees two wine glass holding cows, who appear as "wavy" figures. In order to achieve the "wavy" effect, the Simpsons animators put a ripple glass on the cels and moved it around while shooting the scene. After the contest, Barclay dies of "beef poisoning". The Fox censors were uneasy with including any mention of "beef poisoning" in the episode, as talk show host Oprah Winfrey had recently been sued by "some Texas ranchers" for defaming the beef industry. In a scene in the episode, Homer buys a jar of "Stimu-Crank" pills in order to stay alert while driving during the night. He swallows all the pills at once, to the clerk's dismay. Homer replies, "No problem, I'll balance it out with a bottle of sleeping pills", and proceeds to swallow an entire jar's worth of sleeping pills. According to Scully, the censors had "a lot of trouble" with the scene, but it was included anyhow.

When Homer turns on the truck radio, the song "Wannabe" by the Spice Girls can be heard. Originally, a "trucker song" about "a horrible wreck out on old 95" would be heard. The song was a reference to the "Wreck of the Old 97", a famous locomotive that crashed in 1903 and inspired the country ballad of the same name. It was sung by main cast member Dan Castellaneta, included mentions of "scraping blood and guts off the road" and was eventually dropped because it was considered too gruesome by the staff. The song was later included as a deleted scene on The Simpsons - The Complete Tenth Season DVD box set. While eating dinner at Joe's Diner, "12 Bar Blues" by NRBQ (a band that Mike Scully was fond of) can be heard playing from a jukebox. According to producer Ian Maxtone-Graham, the doorbell tune in the episode "has a history with The Simpsons", as it is also Homer and Marge's wedding song. "Maximum Homerdrive" features the first appearance of Señor Ding-Dong, who is a recurring character in the series. He is portrayed by Castellaneta. Red Barclay, the trucker who dies of "beef poisoning" in The Slaughterhouse, was portrayed by regular cast member Hank Azaria. Barclay's voice is slightly based on that of American actor Gary Busey. The two Jehovah's witnesses were portrayed by Pamela Hayden and Karl Wiedergott.

== Themes and cultural references ==
In Voyages of Discovery: A Manly Adventure in the Lands Down Under, a book about adventuring and masculinity, Ken Ewell described "Maximum Homerdrive" as a "fine example" of "the poor man's lack of travel acumen". He wrote "Homer's usual ineptitude at first spells disaster for the duo, at least until they find out about the truck's auto-drive system. And though he promises to keep the device a secret, Homer can't keep his mouth shut, and so shamefully exposes to the world his un-manful behavior concerning the mates. So given that Homer once again learns absolutely nothing from his traveling experience, he can only take to heart the thoughts of the British writer Stephen Fry. 'At my age travel broadens the behind.'"

The decal on Homer's truck reads "Red Rascal" with an image of a wolf and a redheaded pin-up girl on the side, a possible reference to the 1943 Tex Avery cartoon "Red Hot Riding Hood". In the steak restaurant, a photo of actor and comedian Tony Randall can be seen next to Barclay's photo. Homer's postcard, which reads "Wish you were her", shows a picture of American model Bettie Page. In the scene where Homer drives Barclay's truck into the convoy, Navitron Autodrive System says "I'm afraid I can't let you do this, Red. The risk is unacceptable." The line, as well as the Navitron Autodrive System's voice, is a reference to HAL 9000, the antagonist in the 1968 science fiction film 2001: A Space Odyssey. The episode also references media mogul Ted Turner, with a sign that reads "Atlanta: the home of Ted Turner's mood swings". The title of the episode references the 1986 horror film Maximum Overdrive, which was one of Simpsons cast member Yeardley Smith's first credited screen roles. The 16 pound steak challenge is an homage to The Big Texan Steak Ranch's 72 oz. steak challenge in which contestants are given one hour to eat a 72 oz. steak and the entire meal; if failed, the consumer has to pay $72.

== Release and reception ==
In its original American broadcast on March 28, 1999, "Maximum Homerdrive" received a 9.4 rating/15 percent share, according to Nielsen Media Research, meaning it was seen by 9.4 percent of the population and 15 percent of the people watching television at the time of its broadcast. Among adults between ages 18 and 49, the episode received a 7.8 rating/20 percent share, the strongest rating The Simpsons had in the demographic since "Wild Barts Can't Be Broken", which aired on January 17 the same year. Tom Bierbaum of Variety credited the boost in ratings to the premiere of Futurama, which aired after "Maximum Homerdrive", writing that "Sunday's Futurama preview energized Fox's entire lineup" that night. On August 7, 2007, "Maximum Homerdrive" was released as part of The Simpsons - The Complete Tenth Season DVD box set. Matt Groening, Mike Scully, George Meyer, Ian Maxtone-Graham, Ron Hauge, Matt Selman, Swinton O. Scott III and Mike B. Anderson participated in the DVD's audio commentary of the episode.

Following its home video release, "Maximum Homerdrive" received mixed reviews from critics. James Plath of DVD Town described it as "funny," and Brian Tallerico of UGO Networks considered it to be one of the season's best episodes, describing it as having "some awesome road comedy." Gary Russell and Gareth Roberts, of I Can't Believe It's a Bigger and Better Updated Unofficial Simpsons Guide gave the episode a positive review as well, writing "The life of the trucker, as made popular in C. W. McCall's 1976 hit single "Convoy", is brought to life here in all its glory. For once, Homer is in the right and you cannot help but cheer as the truckers spectacularly fail to stop him getting to Atlanta." They concluded by writing "A nice, bonding story for Homer and Bart which is diametrically opposed to the one featuring Marge and Lisa." On the other hand, giving the episode a more mixed review, Colin Jacobson of DVD Movie Guide wrote "If nothing else, 'Homerdrive' takes unanticipated paths. The eating contest leads to a long truck drives leads to that 'shocking secret'. All of this means the show manages to become pretty unpredictable." However, he maintained that the episode is only "sporadically" funny, and that it "doesn’t ever excel in that department – at least not in terms of the trucker story." He enjoyed the episode's B-story more, because of its "absurdity", however he criticized the inclusion of Gil in the episode, calling the character "increasingly overused". Jake McNeill of Digital Entertainment News gave the episode a mixed review as well, writing that it "may have been a fairly decent episode but for the fact that something similar was done (and done better) on King of the Hill."
