= Bob Bendetson =

American television writer and producer

- Born: Robert Bendetson; August 28, 1954 (age 71); The Bronx, New York, U.S.
- Occupation: Television writer/producer
- Years active: 1976–2006
- Spouse: Heidi
- Children: 2

Robert Bendetson (born August 28, 1954) is an American television writer and producer. He has written for a number of TV series, including ALF, Home Improvement and two episodes for The Simpsons (season 12's "Simpsons Tall Tales" [the "Connie Appleseed" parody] and season 13's "Blame It on Lisa"). He lives with his wife Heidi and his two children Ellie and Jesse Bendetson.

Bendetson served as a supervising producer on Coach, leaving after its fifth season to become co-producer on Home Improvement. He worked on Newhart and wrote the show's final episode "The Last Newhart". He wrote and directed the as yet unreleased film Big Bug Man which contains the final performance of Marlon Brando.

== Filmography ==
=== Writer ===
- TBA Big Bug Man (film) (writer, director)
- 2001–2002 The Simpsons (TV, 2 episodes) (writer; "Simpsons Tall Tales", "Blame It on Lisa")
- 1997 Teen Angel (TV) (co-executive producer)
- 1996 Bunk Bed Brothers (TV) (writer)
- 1991, 1993–1999 Home Improvement (TV) (executive producer, 144 episodes; writer)
- 1989, 1992 Coach (TV, 1 episode) (supervising producer, writer)
- 1988–1990 Newhart (TV, 13 episodes) (supervising producer, writer)
- 1988 Mutts (TV) (producer, writer)
- 1986–1987 ALF (TV) (writer, 8 episodes; executive story editor, 24 episodes; co-producer, 1 episode) (actor, 1 episode)
- 1985 What's Happening Now!! (TV, 1 episode) (writer)
- 1984 Alice (TV, 1 episode) (writer)
- 1981 The Jeffersons (TV, 1 episode) (writer)

== Awards and nominations ==
- 2003 Writers Guild of America Award nomination: Animation for The Simpsons (for episode "Blame It on Lisa")
- 1994 Emmy Award nomination: Outstanding Comedy Series for Home Improvement (shared with other producers of the show)
- 1990 Emmy Award nomination: Outstanding Writing in a Comedy Series for Newhart (shared with Mark Egan and Mark Solomon)
