= Big Bug Man =

Unproduced American animated film

- Official poster
- Directed by: Bob Bendetson; Peter Shin
- Written by: Bob Bendetson
- Produced by: Stuart Black Bob Bendetson
- Starring: Brendan Fraser; Marlon Brando; Michael Madsen; Paul Shaffer; Andre 3000; B.B. King; Fantasia Barrino
- Production company: Studio-Free Studios
- Country: United States
- Language: English
- Budget: $20 million

Big Bug Man is an unproduced American animated film starring Brendan Fraser and Marlon Brando. The film, to have been produced by Studio-Free Studios, was written by Bob Bendetson, who also wrote episodes for the TV show The Simpsons. It was directed by Bendetson and Peter Shin.

It was originally scheduled for release between 2006 and 2008, but it was never completed due to lack of funds. The film is Brando's last known film work.

== Premise ==
Candy company worker Howard Kind (Brendan Fraser) gains special abilities after being bitten by insects.

== Production ==
The film is hand-drawn. The production of the film cost approximately US$20 million.

=== Marlon Brando during the production ===
Brando was originally asked to be the voice of Nicholas Dunderbeck, but Brando thought it would be fun to voice the old lady Mrs. Sour instead.

Mrs. Sour is only in three scenes, so it took only one day to record the voice of this character. Marcie Tobias directed Brando's session. According to the director Bob Bendetson, Brando wore a blond wig, a dress, white gloves, and full makeup while recording the voice of Mrs. Sour. Bendetson believes this was part humorous, and part wanting to get into character. Bendetson said "About halfway through he took off the wig because he was getting too hot." According to the film's executive producer Gabriel Grunfeld, Brando described the part as "the most fun I've had since playing Mark Antony in Julius Caesar". Grunfeld said that even though Brando was frail, he was full of energy and invention.

The recording took place in Marlon Brando's home, on June 10, 2004. By this point in his life, Brando was on oxygen six hours a day. He died three weeks later, on July 1, 2004.

== Characters ==
Big Bug Man characters

- Howard Kind – voiced by Brendan Fraser. A soft and unfortunate employee of the candy factory, who accidentally gets bitten by bugs, and becomes the Big Bug Man
- Mrs. Sour – voiced by Marlon Brando. The founder, leader and matriarch of the big and corrupt Mrs. Sour Candy Company.
- Nicholas Dunderbeck – Main antagonist, runs the Mrs. Sour Candy Company and is married to Mrs. Sour.
- Petfarkin - voiced by Paul Shaffer, Dunderbeck's lackey.
- Ellie Rose - Howard's love interest.
- Sidney Looper – voiced by Andre 3000. a scientist whose bugs bite Howard.
- Seen It All Jackson - voiced by B.B. King, the film's narrator.
- Heard It All Jackson - voiced by, Seen It All's dog.
- Michael Madsen and Fantasia Barrino were also cast at some point in roles.
