= Mom and Pop Art =

- The Simpsons episode
- Episode no.: Season 10; Episode 19
- Directed by: Steven Dean Moore
- Written by: Al Jean
- Production code: AABF15
- Original air date: April 11, 1999

Guest appearances
- Isabella Rossellini as Astrid Weller; Jasper Johns as himself

Episode features
- Chalkboard gag: "A trained ape could not teach gym"
- Couch gag: A parody of a scene from the film Dr. Strangelove; the Simpsons (wearing cowboy hats) straddle the couch as it drops from a bomb bay door towards the ground.
- Commentary: Matt Groening; Mike Scully; Al Jean; George Meyer; Steven Dean Moore

Episode chronology
← Previous "Simpsons Bible Stories"	Next → "The Old Man and the 'C' Student"
- The Simpsons season 10

"Mom and Pop Art" is the nineteenth episode of the tenth season of the American animated television series The Simpsons. It was first aired on Fox in the United States on April 11, 1999. In this episode, Homer inadvertently becomes a well-praised outsider artist after his failed attempts to build a barbecue pit. His exhibit goes to the Louvre, and after Mr. Burns buys his artwork, Homer becomes a success. However, after his new art appears in the "Art in America" show, Homer's artwork is criticized for being too repetitive of his first piece. After his recent failure, Homer tries to devise something groundbreaking, after hearing of Christo's art.

"Mom and Pop Art" was directed by Steven Dean Moore and was the first episode Al Jean wrote after his return to The Simpsons writing staff. The plot was conceived by Jean, who was inspired by a segment about found artists on the television news magazine 60 Minutes. The episode features contemporary artist Jasper Johns as himself, and also features Italian actress Isabella Rossellini as Astrid Weller. It references several famous artworks, such as those of Leonardo da Vinci and Henri Rousseau.

In its original broadcast, the episode was seen by approximately 8.5 million viewers, finishing in 23rd place in the ratings the week it aired.

Following the home video release of The Simpsons – The Complete Tenth Season, "Mom and Pop Art" received mixed reviews from critics.

== Plot ==
While trying to install a DIY barbecue pit, Homer bungles the job by accidentally dropping parts of the barbecue into wet cement. He frantically tries to assemble the barbecue pit before the cement hardens, but only makes things worse. In the end, Homer is left with a mismatched collection of parts stuck in hardened cement, and mangles it further in a rage. He takes the results of his work back to the store he bought the kit from for a refund, which he does not receive. On the way home, Homer loses control of the wagon containing the jumbled mess of concrete and bricks, which rolls down the highway and crashes into a woman's car, wrecking it. Homer flees the scene of the accident, but the woman, artist Astrid Weller, tracks him down because she sees his handiwork as being a masterpiece of outsider art. Homer's exhibit goes to the Louvre, and when Mr. Burns buys his work, he becomes recognized as an artist.

Homer channels his rage to continue his work and befriends other pop art artists, like Jasper Johns. All the while, his easily achieved fame makes Marge jealous, due to her lack of success at becoming a successful artist despite years of effort. Homer later gets a notice from Astrid Weller that his work will be in the "Art in America" show, but his new masterpieces are rejected by Springfield's residents and his new "friends" for being repetitive of his first piece.

Down on his luck and starved for inspiration, Marge recommends Homer visit the Springfield Art Museum. But none of the art Homer sees serves to inspire him; he feels inadequate when he sees what other artists have done, and it only worsens the situation when he takes a nap and has a nightmare of various paintings attacking him. He goes back home, discouraged, but is soon given a suggestion by Lisa. She tells him about the artist Christo, causing Homer to try doing something similarly groundbreaking. He and Bart flood Springfield by opening all the fire hydrants (having covered the sewer drains with the city's doormats, including their own) and putting snorkels in the animals of the zoo (so that they do not drown). Surprisingly, Astrid Weller and even the whole town of Springfield is impressed with Homer's work, and enjoy the newly made "Grand Canals of Springfield" along with the swimming zoo animals. As Marge and Homer kiss each other on the roof of their house, Jasper Johns comes on a boat and steals the painting Marge was working on.

== Production ==
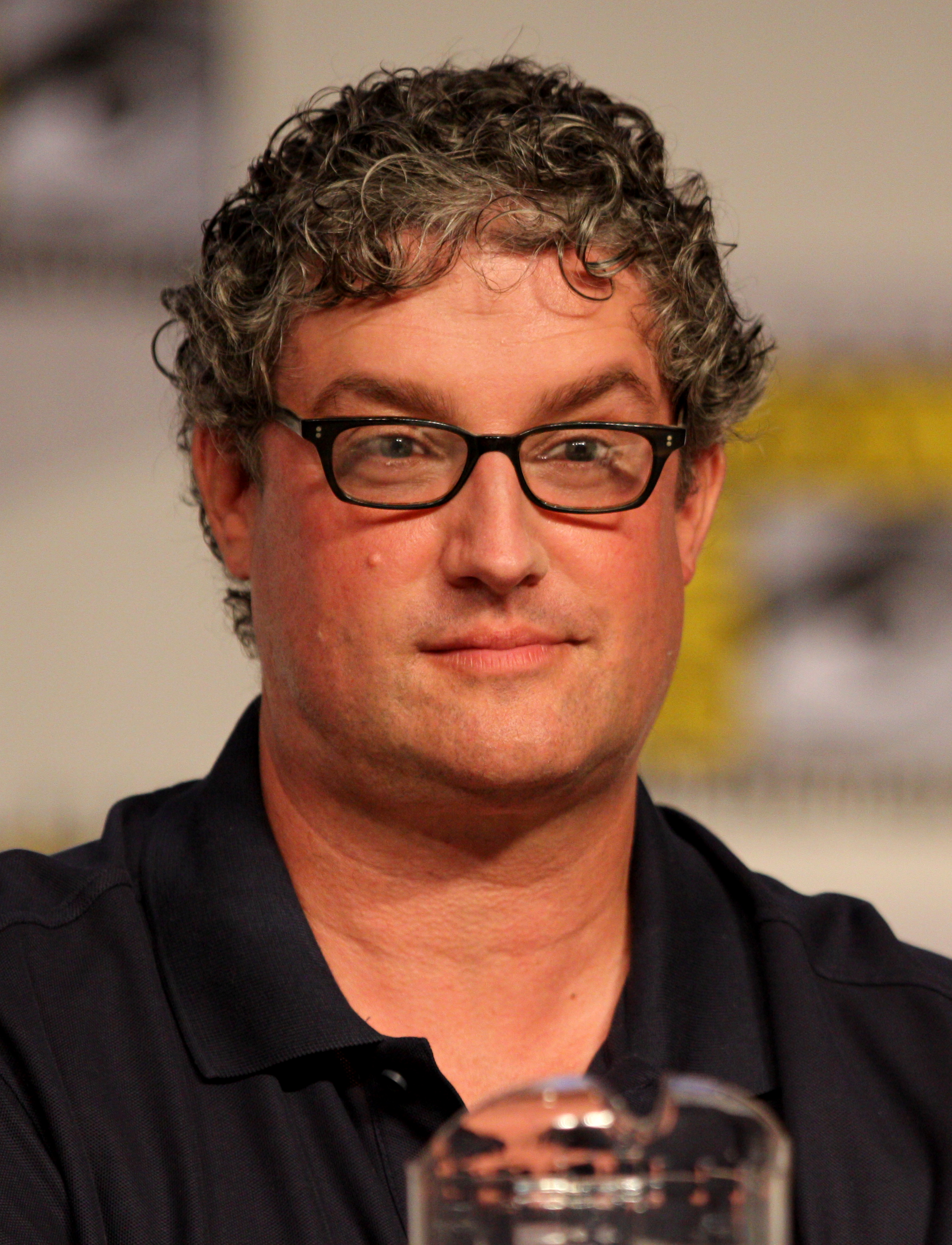
"Mom and Pop Art" was the first episode Al Jean wrote after returning to The Simpsons writing staff.

"Mom and Pop Art" was written by current showrunner Al Jean and directed by Steven Dean Moore. It was first broadcast on the Fox network in the United States on April 11, 1999. It was the first episode Jean wrote after returning to The Simpsons writing staff. For three years, Jean had worked with Mike Reiss on the fantasy sitcom Teen Angel, a job that he despised. "Every other day [that I worked on Teen Angel] I said 'I wish I was back at The Simpsons'," Jean said in the DVD commentary for the episode. The idea for the episode came from a segment of the television news magazine 60 Minutes. The segment was about found artists, who, Jean said, "take basically garbage and assemble it[...] and turn it into artwork that would sell for tens of thousands of dollars." Jean thought that this profession would fit Homer. In the episode, "Start here tomorrow 7/17/95" is written in blue paint on the Simpsons' garage door. The date refers to Scully and Julie Thacker's anniversary, which was on July 17, 1995. In the episode's setpiece, the Simpsons visit a hardware store. The segment was inspired by Jean's father, who owned a hardware store that Al Jean used to work in as a child. Later in the setpiece, Homer tries to construct a barbecue that he bought from the hardware store. The scene was also conceived by Jean, and is executive producer and former showrunner Mike Scully's favorite setpiece.

While the designs of Homer's new art friends were not based on anybody in particular, the "German guy" was drawn to hold his cigarette in a "European way" by animation director Jim Reardon. When visiting the Springfield museum, Homer and Marge see a painting showing Akbar and Jeff, two characters from The Simpsons creator Matt Groening's comic strip Life in Hell. The painting's frame was also signed by Groening himself in real life. The painting next to Groening's was drawn by Scully's friend Tom Gagnon, who is an artist. Some of the paintings in the episode's second act were also drawn by friends of Dean Moore. At one point in Homer's dream, the Vitruvian Man appears and attacks him. According to Groening, there were "some controversy" over whether or not the Vitruvian Man would be in nude or not, as he is in the original painting. In the episode, he is wearing a jockstrap. At the end of the episode, Springfield is flooded with water, and Marge is seen painting a picture on the Simpsons' roof. Her painting was drawn by staff animator Amy Clese, who drew it as a recreation of a painting by J. M. W. Turner, an English Romantic painter. According to Dean Moore, the painting was "pretty difficult" to animate, as it was drawn with a lot of washes and gradients. He added, however, that he was "very happy" with it.

"Mom and Pop Art" features American contemporary artist Jasper Johns as himself. His lines were recorded over the telephone, and Jean stated that it was "extremely exciting" to have him appear in the episode. The episode also features Italian actress Isabella Rossellini as Astrid. Jean stated that her performance was "terrific" and that she was "wonderful to work with", although there was one line in particular that she had difficulty performing. In a scene in the episode, Astrid introduces the audience in an art club to Homer's art. Originally, she would have said "you snorted my father's ashes", but because of Rossellini's accent, it sounded like she said "you snorted my father's ass", according to Jean. Because none of the recorded takes sounded good, the line was ultimately scrapped from the episode.

== Cultural references ==
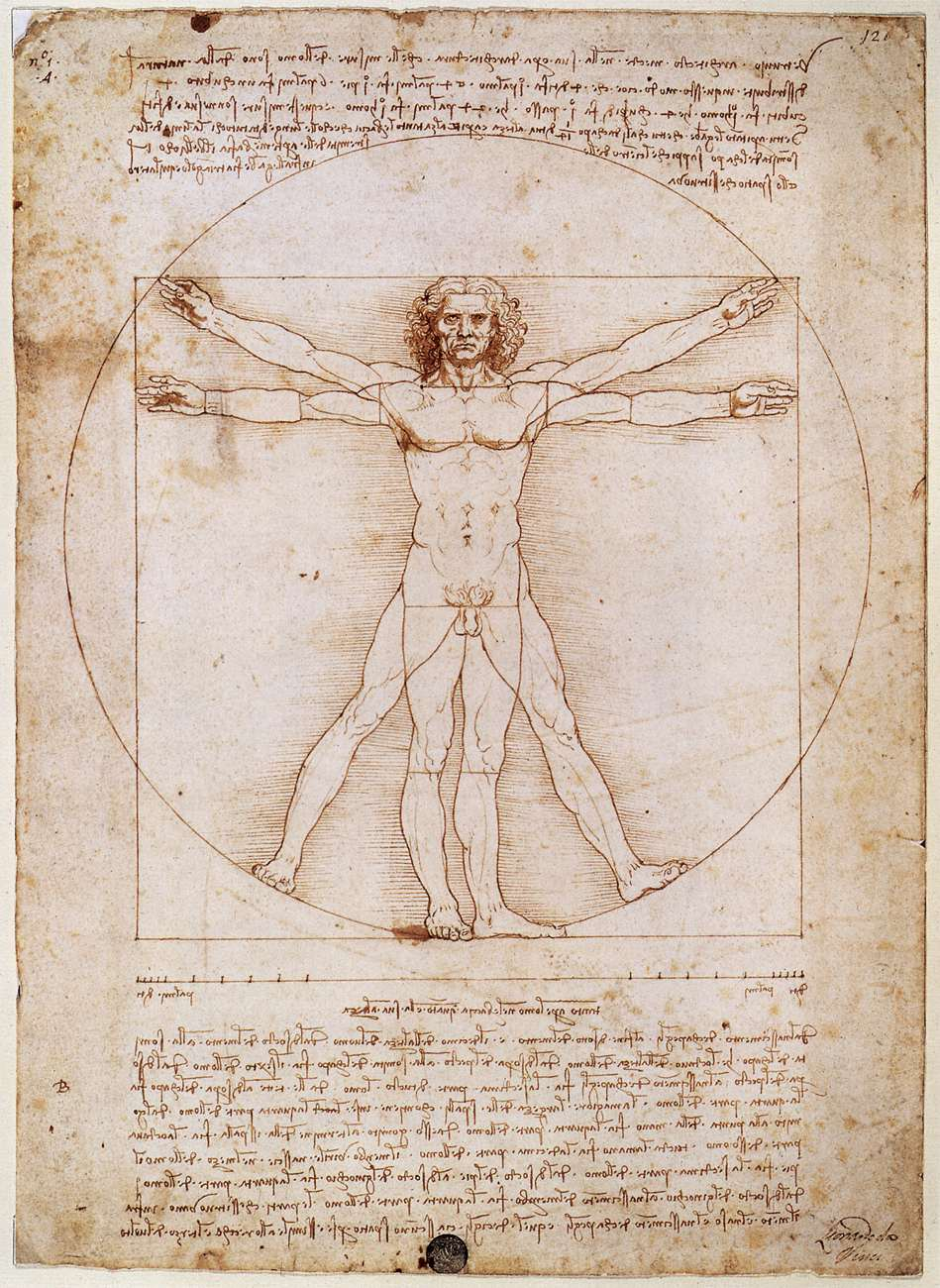
The Vitruvian Man by Leonardo da Vinci is referenced in the episode.

"Mom and Pop Art" features several references to famous works of art. At the museum, Marge shows Homer The Dogano, San Giorgio, Citella, from the Steps of the Europa by J. M. W. Turner. They then pass Pablo Picasso's paintings Old Guitarist, Seated Harlequin and Les Demoiselles d'Avignon.

In Homer's dream, Homer is lying in a similar way to the woman in French Naïve artist Henri Rousseau's painting The Sleeping Gypsy, as is the lion that licks him. After he is waken up by the lion, Homer is attacked by the Vitruvian Man, a drawing by Italian polymath Leonardo da Vinci. Then Homer gets attacked by Three Musicians by Pablo Picasso in which their instruments turn into machine guns and shoot at Homer. At one point in his dream, Homer sees a clock that drips water. The scene is a reference to The Persistence of Memory, a painting by Spanish Catalan surrealist artist Salvador Dalí. Near the end of his dream, Homer meets American painter Andy Warhol, who throws soup cans at him. It is a reference to Campbell's Soup Cans, a painting by Warhol.

Also, Johns is portrayed as a kleptomaniac, a person who compulsively steals objects of little to no value. It is a reference to Johns's art style, as he usually uses objects from everyday life for his artwork. In a scene in the episode, Homer channels his anger into his art. The scene is a reference to the 1959 comedy horror film A Bucket of Blood, in which an artist is screaming at a piece of clay to be a nose. After having flooded Springfield, Homer tells Marge that the city is "like Venice, without the black plague". The line refers to the outbreak of the bubonic plague that swept through Europe in the 14th century. In the scene, a lion can be seen swimming in the water. The notion that lions can swim is a reference to the season 2 episode "Bart the Daredevil", in which the famous daredevil Lance Murdock performs a stunt that involves swimming lions.

== Reception ==
In its original American broadcast on April 11, 1999, "Mom and Pop Art" received an 8.5 rating, according to Nielsen Media Research, translating to approximately 8.5 million viewers. The episode finished in 23rd place in the ratings for the week of April 5–11, 1999, making it the fourth-most watched program on Fox that night, after a new episode of The X-Files, Ally McBeal, and Family Guy. On August 7, 2007, the episode was released as part of The Simpsons – The Complete Tenth Season DVD box set. Matt Groening, Mike Scully, Al Jean, George Meyer and Steven Dean Moore participated in the DVD's audio commentary of the episode.

Following its home video release, "Mom and Pop Art" received mixed reviews from critics.

Giving it a positive review, Chris Barsanti of Filmcritic.com described it as "one of the show's most gratifying ep[isode]s". He wrote "Amidst Homer's accidental acceptance as a producer of rage-filled outsider art, the episode concocts a knowing satire—but also warm appreciation—of modern art," and added that it "includes one of the show's best cameos of all time: a kleptomaniacal Jasper Johns."

Both James Plath of DVD Town and Jake MacNeill of Digital Entertainment News considered it to be one of the season's best episodes.

The A.V. Club named Milhouse's line "Everything's coming up Milhouse!" as one of the quotes from The Simpsons that can be used in everyday situations. The line was pitched by writer Dan Greaney.

Giving the episode a mixed review, DVD Movie Guide's Colin Jacobson described it as "pretty average." He wrote that "Mom and Pop Art" "offer[s] more than a few elements that echo bits from earlier years". He concluded by writing that the episode "isn’t a bad program, but it lacks much inspiration".

Gary Russell and Gareth Roberts, of I Can't Believe It's a Bigger and Better Updated Unofficial Simpsons Guide wrote, "Well, Marge is justifiably upset when, as an artist herself, it is Homer who is suddenly getting the kudos for producing rubbish. It's a good gag but probably not enough to stretch out for an entire episode." However, they added that the last scenes, along with Johns's cameo, were "pure joy", even though the episode "drag[s] in the middle".
