= Weekend at Burnsie's =

- The Simpsons episode
- Episode no.: Season 13; Episode 16
- Directed by: Michael Marcantel
- Written by: Jon Vitti
- Production code: DABF11
- Original air date: April 7, 2002

Guest appearance
- Phish as themselves

Episode features
- Couch gag: The couch is replaced by a hedge. A gardener comes in and creates a topiary statue of The Simpsons.
- Commentary: Matt Groening; Al Jean; Matt Selman; Don Payne; Jon Vitti; Tom Gammill; Max Pross; Mike Reiss; David Silverman

Episode chronology
← Previous "Blame It on Lisa"	Next → "Gump Roast"
- The Simpsons season 13

"Weekend at Burnsie's" is the sixteenth episode of the thirteenth season of the American animated television series The Simpsons. It first aired in the United States on the Fox network on April 7, 2002. In the episode, Homer Simpson is prescribed medicinal marijuana after getting pecked in the eyes by a murder of crows. While his family and friends worry about the drug altering his personality, Homer becomes Mr. Burns's vice president after cracking up at Burns's antiquated jokes.

The episode was directed by Michael Marcantel. The plot idea for the episode was pitched by George Meyer, who wanted to make an episode about Homer getting addicted to medicinal marijuana. Executive producer and current showrunner Al Jean found the idea "very funny" and gave former staff writer Jon Vitti the duty to write the episode's first draft. Fox was initially very uneasy to pass the episode for broadcast, since they were concerned that it might encourage younger viewers to smoke marijuana. Even though The Simpsons' staff slightly altered the episode by not actually showing Homer smoke his medicinal marijuana, the network was still worried that it might cause a controversy.

The use of medicinal marijuana is prominently featured throughout "Weekend at Burnsie's". Because the legislation of medicinal marijuana is a controversial issue, The Simpsons' staff has stated that they wanted to explore both sides of the argument, showing both the negative and positive effects of marijuana use. The episode does not come to an absolute conclusion about the issue. The episode also criticizes the use of genetically modified foods, and references Citizen Kane, Dragnet, The Birds, and Judy Garland, among other things. It also features the rock band Phish as themselves.

Despite the network's initial concerns, "Weekend at Burnsie's" did not attract any controversy. In its original broadcast, the episode was seen by approximately 7.2 million viewers, finishing in 46th place in the ratings the week it aired. Following the thirteenth season's release on DVD and Blu-ray on August 24, 2010, the episode received mostly positive reviews from critics.

The episode is one of several from the series that has been restricted to post-watershed airings in the UK due to its drug use and references. The episode was also rated M in Australia, making it the second episode to receive the rating after "Natural Born Kissers".

== Plot ==
After a bad experience with genetically modified food, Marge decides to grow her own vegetables in a newly created garden. Crows converge on the garden, so Marge makes a scarecrow, which scares Homer away. Homer then returns and destroys the scarecrow, and the crows see Homer as their leader, following him everywhere and doing his bidding. However, when the crows try to carry Maggie, Homer turns on them and they attack his eyes. He is prescribed medicinal marijuana to deal with the searing pain he is feeling.

Homer begins to enjoy smoking marijuana, and gets an unexpected bonus when his giddy-stoned happy reactions to Mr. Burns's awful jokes earn him a promotion to Executive Vice President. However, a petition circulated by Ned Flanders to ban medical use of marijuana, which Homer actually signs while in an altered state, is placed onto a ballot. Homer organises a pro-marijuana rally, which is supported by rock band Phish. However, it becomes apparent during the event that the vote has already taken place, and that medical marijuana has been outlawed. By this point, Homer is cured of his medical condition and promises he will not smoke marijuana again.

Burns asks Homer to help him with a speech for an emergency meeting at which the power plant's investors will vote to either give it a $60 million bailout or close it down for good. Homer gives Smithers his last joint, and while Smithers is smoking it, Burns apparently drowns in his bathtub. For the meeting, Smithers and Homer attach wires to Burns' body and control him like a marionette; the awkward, jerky movements cause his heart to start beating again. The meeting is a success, and another financial crisis at the plant is avoided. Burns appreciates that he was revived, but repeatedly slaps Homer and Smithers for initially pretending he was dead.

== Production ==
"Weekend at Burnsie's" was written by Jon Vitti and directed by Michael Marcantel. It was first broadcast on the Fox network in the United States on April 7, 2002. The idea for the episode was pitched by former staff writer George Meyer, who wanted to make an episode in which Homer becomes addicted to medicinal marijuana. Executive producer and current showrunner Al Jean thought that the premise sounded "very funny" and assigned Vitti to write the episode's first draft. Vitti wrote the script at his home and did not participate in any rewriting sessions with the other staff writers. "[...] it's a funny bunch of people", he said in the episode's DVD commentary. "You definitely lose touch with what the movies you're supposed to see, what's good on TV..." "Weekend at Burnsie's" is the second episode Vitti wrote in which a character forgets to vote at an election, and the second episode he wrote in which Homer takes a chemical that causes him to be promoted by Burns and run into conflict with Smithers. "You can't do anything for the first time at this point", Vitti quipped. Producer and former showrunner Mike Reiss has stated that he thoroughly enjoyed working on "Weekend at Burnsie's". "I gotta say, this was the most fun I ever had working on an episode", he said in the episode's DVD commentary. "Everyone but me had stories to tell [about various things]. There would be about four hours of recollection before any rewriting happened."

Because the use of medicinal marijuana is prominently featured in the episode, Fox had "incredible fears" about it and were very hesitant to have it broadcast. They especially disapproved of a scene in which Homer smokes marijuana for the first time, since they did not want to instruct children how to smoke. The staff discussed the scene for a long time with the network until they came up with a compromise. Just before the joint touches Homer's lips, the scene cuts to a psychedelic sequence that transpires from the joint's tip. Despite their concerns, Jean opined that the network gave the staff a "pretty good amount" of creative freedom with the episode. "[...] obviously, the network didn't want us glorifying casual marijuana use", he said in an interview with the music magazine Relix. "[...] like we usually do, we look at everything from two sides and it's supposed to be a thoughtful look at a serious thing". Despite the modification of the scene, the network and the series' staff members were still worried about how the episode would be received. "Weeks before it aired, we were going 'This is really going to kill everything...'", Jean said in the episode's DVD commentary.

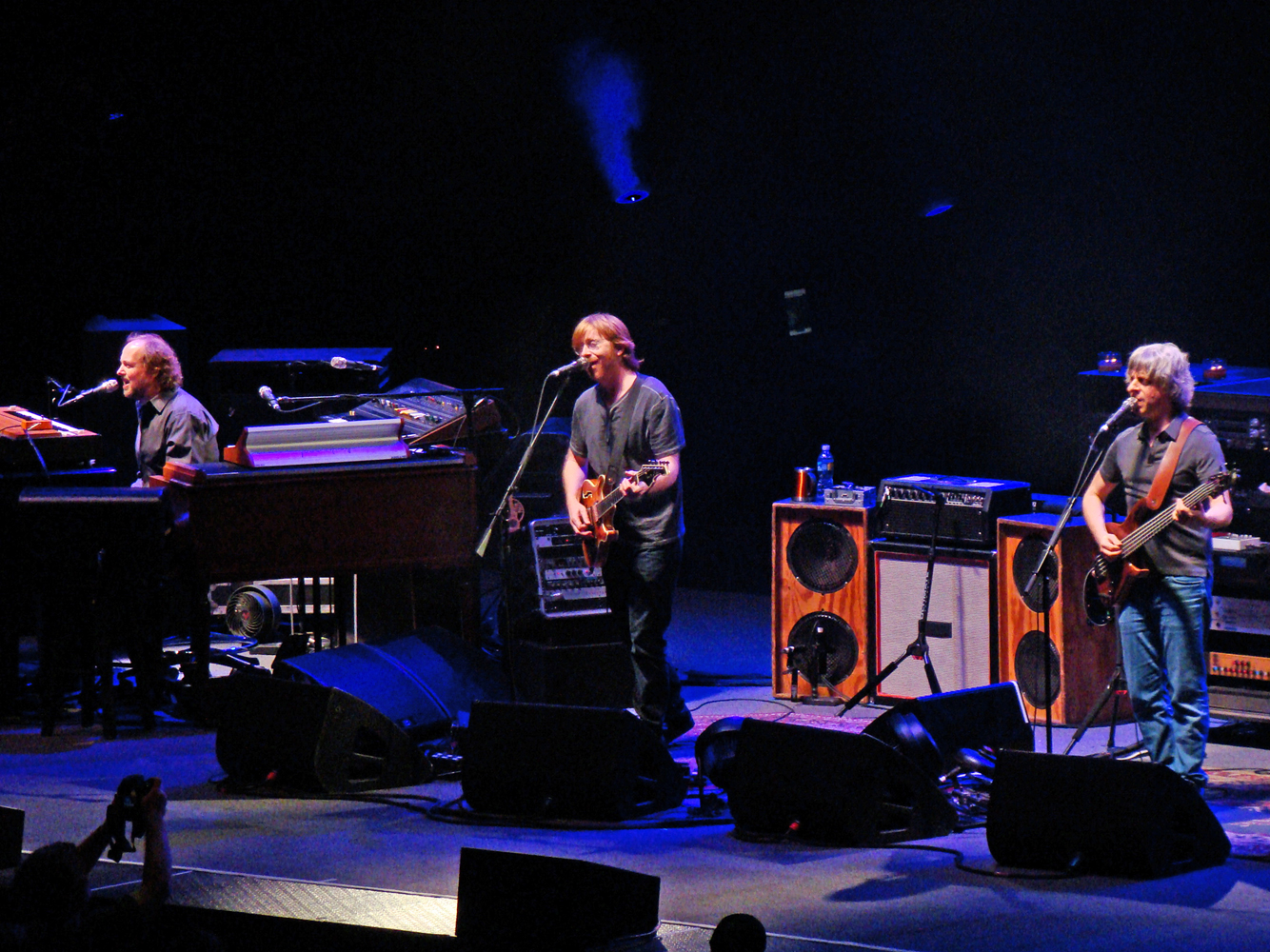
The rock band Phish guest starred as themselves in the episode.

After being attacked by the crows, Homer is seen being treated by Dr. Hibbert at the Springfield General Hospital. While there are no visible scars on him, the character instead has a slightly curled hair. During a color screening of the scene, Homer's body looked "a little too bloody" and damaged, prompting the staff to change it. "One thing I learned a long time ago is, you gotta be careful how you change [the characters'] basic model pack[s]", Jean said in the episode's DVD commentary. He also said that he was happy that many viewers identify with the characters and don't want to see them get hurt or injured in any way. "They don't mind if [Homer] falls down a cliff but [...] he should recover." While working on the episode, the series' staff debated what size to make Homer's pupils when he is under the influence of marijuana. Because a common effect of smoking marijuana is dilated pupils, the animators initially suggested widening Homer's, but settled for just dilating them slightly.

"Weekend at Burnsie's" features the members of the jam band Phish – Trey Anastasio, Page McConnell, Mike Gordon and Jon Fishman – as themselves. At the time of the episode's recording, Phish was in the middle of a two-year hiatus from touring and recording, but the members agreed to record dialogue together for the show. The idea to include the band in the episode was pitched during the episode's production. "Phish plays at the rally. We thought they'd be the perfect group to use for the plot.", Jean said. Meyer, who pitched the episode's premise, was a fan of the band, but Jean did not know much of them before they appeared in the episode; "I've never seen one of their concerts, so I'm not the most familiar", he said. He first became aware of the band after reading an article about them in Entertainment Weekly. As they worked on the episode however, Jean became more acquainted with the band members. "They were nice", he said. "Jon Fishman said to me that the band had talked from time to time about if they were to ever be on The Simpsons, what it would be like. I said, 'Well, how close was it?' He said, 'Pretty close to what we expected.' (laughs) That was gratifying." The band performs their song "Run Like an Antelope" during their appearance in the episode. During their scene, Anastasio is shown playing a few bars of The Simpsons theme song on his guitar, which he often did during the band's concerts in the mid 1990s as part of a series of "secret language" signals they had taught their fans.

According to Peter Shapiro of Relix, some fans of Phish debated whether or not there had been any references to the band before this episode. While the band was mentioned by name in the season 12 episode "Lisa the Tree Hugger", there had not been any conscious attempts to reference the band before "Weekend at Burnsie's." This includes a scene in the season 11 episode "Saddlesore Galactica", which shows Duncan the diving horse hanging from a hoist; some Phish fans argued that the scene was a "blatant" reference to the cover of the band's seventh studio album, Hoist. "That was a total coincidence", Jean said. "It reminds me of the whole Wizard of Oz/Pink Floyd (Dark Side of the Moon) hook-up. I haven't done it and I'm sure it works, but I just keep thinking that it must be a coincidence. Before there was the invention of video, I don't know how Pink Floyd would have done a whole album to a movie."

== Themes and cultural references ==
On May 17, 2002, Robert S. Stephens and Roger A. Roffman of The Seattle Times wrote an analysis of "Weekend at Burnsie's" in a guest column for the newspaper. The two argued that drugs are almost always shown as having only negative effects, even though 10 million people in the United States use marijuana for recreational purposes. "We believe there are good reasons for a more honest dialogue about the positive and negative effects of marijuana use. A recent episode of the popular TV show The Simpsons highlighted the pros and cons of marijuana use, and Homer Simpson's experiences with marijuana provide an example of what we mean", they wrote. For example, when under the influence of marijuana, Homer is relieved from the pain in his eye, and he also finds himself having a variety of sensory experiences and an enhanced appreciation of music and food. "These are real effects reported by many marijuana users, and we would be hard pressed to call them anything other than benefits", Stephens and Roffman wrote. However, Homer is also depicted spending more time with other drug users than with his family, and his friends find that his personality has changed. Eventually, Homer is shown having problems with memory and attention, losing track of the date on which a pro-marijuana rally takes place. Stephens and Roffman wrote that the side effects shown in the episode are "Perhaps a bit exaggerated, but clearly there are costs of marijuana use similar to these that are experienced by real-life users."

Jean has stated that he "does not know enough" to say whether he approves of the legislation of medicinal marijuana, but none of The Simpsons' writers use the drug. "It's one of the most sober writing staffs I've ever encountered", staff writer Max Pross said in the episode's DVD commentary. When asked about what stance the episode holds regarding the legislation of medicinal marijuana, Jean said that series' staff wanted to explore both sides of the issue, rather than making an absolute statement. He added that the episode is rather a critique of legislations that are immediately criminalized after they are legitimized. "The stance is that it seems ridiculous to legalize something and then criminalize it, which I have seen happen in various states", Jean said. He continued, "It's just weird to take away a right or to grant people a liberty and then abandon it. I would say that's the strongest statement [the episode] makes." The episode also criticizes the use of genetically modified foods. At the beginning of the episode, Marge announces that the family's dinner includes genetically modified vegetables, to which Lisa replies "American corporations should stop playing god with nature." She then notices that her potato starts eating her carrot. Even though the episode portrays genetic modifications in a negative light, none of The Simpsons' writers were actually against the technique. After the scene was written, Reiss asked all the writers if they were against genetic modifications of food, and none of them were. "Very often we take these stands on the show that we do not believe in at all", Reiss explained in the DVD commentary for the episode. The scene was originally three times longer, and was conceived during a rewrite session with the staff writers.

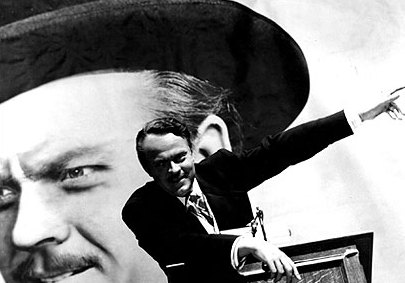
Homer stands in front of a poster of a larger version of himself, as did Charles Foster Kane in Citizen Kane

The name of the episode is a reference to the 1989 comedy film Weekend at Bernie's, in which two young insurance executives try to convince people that their deceased boss is alive. The last part of the episode, in which Homer and Smithers believe that they have killed Burns, is based on the film's plot. While under the influence of marijuana, Homer shaves his beard, causing blood to pour out from his face. To Homer, the blood looks like psychedelic rainbows, and the song that plays during the scene is "Wear Your Love Like Heaven" by Scottish singer-songwriter Donovan. When speaking at the Phish concert, Homer stands in front of a large picture of himself. The scene is a reference to the 1941 drama film Citizen Kane, in which the main character Charles Foster Kane makes a political speech in front of a large picture of himself. In another scene, Homer and Smithers smoke marijuana in order to find Mr. Burns' jokes funny. While high, Smithers wears a suit similar to one worn by American actress and singer Judy Garland. While talking to Homer, Smithers forgets to take Mr. Burns out of his bathtub. Horrified, Smithers thinks that the unconscious Mr. Burns has drowned. The scene is a reference to "The Big High", an episode of the television crime drama Dragnet in which a married couple accidentally drown their baby while they are smoking marijuana.

== Release ==
In its original American broadcast on April 7, 2002, "Weekend at Burnsie's" received a 6.8 rating, according to Nielsen Media Research, translating to approximately 7.2 million viewers. The episode finished in 34th place in the ratings for the week of April 1-7, 2002, tying with a new episode of the comedy television series Malcolm in the Middle.

On August 24, 2010, "Weekend at Burnsie's" was released as part of The Simpsons: The Complete Thirteenth Season DVD and Blu-ray set. Matt Groening, Al Jean, Matt Selman, Don Payne, Jon Vitti, Tom Gammill, Max Pross, Mike Reiss and David Silverman participated in the audio commentary of the episode.

Following its home video release, "Weekend at Burnsie's" received mostly positive reviews from critics.

Jennifer Malkowski of DVD Verdict praised the episode's premise, writing that it "brim[s] with potential" even though it is "fairly simple". She also praised the episode's setpiece, which she described as "particularly good", even though she found it to be "super-random". She gave the episode an A− rating and added that it has "lots of great gags".

Writing for WhatCulture!, Adam Rayner described "Weekend at Burnsie's" as "utterly hilarious" and "superbly executed". He wrote, "Apart from being very funny, the episode also manages to make statements about Marijuana, but never becomes preachy." He continued that it can be compared to the series' best episodes, writing that it "resemble[s] The Simpsons in its glory years".

Casey Broadwater of Blu-ray.com considers it to be one of the season's best episodes, and so did High-Def Digest's Aaron Peck, who described it as one of his personal favorites.

James Plath, a reviewer for DVD Town, wrote that the episode is a "classic".

However, giving the episode a mixed review, Colin Jacobson of DVD Movie Guide wrote that "Weekend at Burnsie's" "falls into the abyss as a distinctly ordinary episode." He continued, "Like many other S13 shows, this one feels recycled, as it lacks much to make it stand out as creative or memorable." He summarized the episode as being "decidedly mediocre".

Nate Boss of Project-Blu disliked the episode, calling it "terrible", "utterly preachy" and "too damn political for its own good." He criticized the Simpsons staff for making an episode about marijuana, as he believed that children might imitate Homer. "Congrats, Simpsons, you just pissed off those who choose to live sober, by pandering to stupid college kids and idiot high schoolers who may be your only remaining fans", Boss wrote.

Since its broadcast, "Weekend at Burnsie's" garnered little to no scrutiny from viewers. Vitti has never gotten any questions about the episode, except from his sister-in-law who wanted him to explain the episode for his nephews. "[...] My sister-in-law called me up saying that I needed to talk to my nephews about how this was wrong that Homer did", Vitti said. "They watched it and had lots of questions for her. And she referred them all to me. So there are some people who are still bothered by it." The little amount of scrutiny that the episode attracted took The Simpsons' staff by surprise, as they anticipated that the episode would generate a lot of controversy. Instead, "Blame It on Lisa", an episode which aired the previous week, caused an uproar in Brazil because of its depiction of the country. It became one of the biggest controversies the series has ever faced. "It just goes to show that you never know what's going to be a problem", Jean said in the DVD commentary for "Weekend at Burnsie's".
