= Children of a Lesser Clod =

- The Simpsons episode
- Episode no.: Season 12; Episode 20
- Directed by: Mike Frank Polcino
- Written by: Al Jean
- Production code: CABF16
- Original air date: May 13, 2001

Episode features
- Chalkboard gag: "Today is not Mothra's Day"
- Couch gag: The Simpsons are a family of crash test dummies that get slammed into the TV as part of the test. The Homer dummy’s head falls off from the sudden trauma.
- Commentary: Mike Scully; Al Jean; Ian Maxtone-Graham; Matt Selman; Tom Gammill; Max Pross; Mike Frank Polcino; Mike B. Anderson

Episode chronology
← Previous "I'm Goin' to Praiseland"	Next → "Simpsons Tall Tales"
- The Simpsons season 12

"Children of a Lesser Clod" is the twentieth and penultimate episode of the twelfth season of the American animated television series The Simpsons. It first aired on the Fox network in the United States on May 13, 2001. In the episode, after spraining his knee during a basketball game, Homer begins taking care of the neighborhood kids to cure his boredom, prompting jealousy from Bart and Lisa, who feel that Homer is giving the kids the attention they never had.

The episode is written by current showrunner Al Jean, and directed by Mike Frank Polcino. The title is a parody of the play Children of a Lesser God and its film adaptation.

== Plot ==
The family goes to the local YMCA to attend one-time-only free classes. Homer participates in a basketball class, but suffers a torn ACL after a dunk attempt ends with the backboard crashing down on his leg. After Homer gets surgery, he is told by Dr. Hibbert that he cannot go to work and must stay home, where he finds himself extremely bored. One evening, Ned asks Homer to watch Rod and Todd while he attends a Chris Rock concert (that he believes is a Christian rock concert). Rod and Todd enjoy having Homer take care of them, which gives Homer the idea to establish his own day care center.

Homer turns his house into the "Uncle Homer's Day Care Center". With Homer giving all his attention to other kids, Bart and Lisa feel neglected. The daycare center is wildly successful, and Homer earns a nomination for the "Good Guy Awards", but during a video tribute at the awards ceremony, Bart and Lisa splice in home movie footage of Homer at his worst (passed out drunk next to the tree on Christmas day, betting, and losing, Maggie to Moe in a poker game, and chasing Bart with a medieval flail while yelling, "I'll mace you good!"). The audience becomes outraged and Homer angrily strangles Bart on stage, unwittingly exposing his worst behavior in front of everyone in the audience, who become horrified and decide to prevent him from watching their kids. Homer escapes from the ceremony with all the kids in a van, until he crashes into a tree, and is caught by the police.

After three mistrials, Homer apologizes to Bart and Lisa for neglecting them and promises to care only for them (and Maggie) instead of the neighborhood kids. The episode ends with the family eating from the craft services table because the union workers never came to retrieve it.

== Production ==
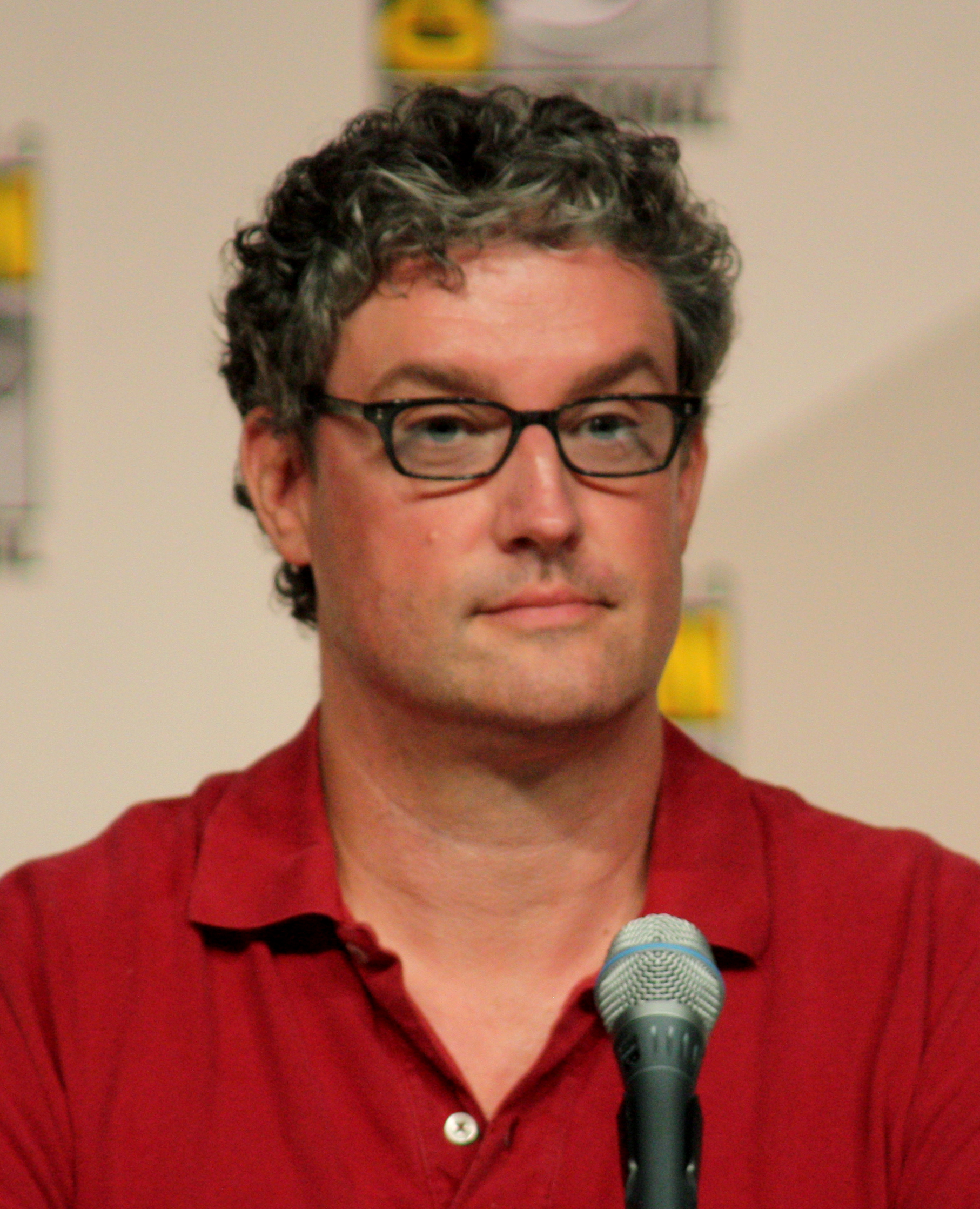
Al Jean wrote the episode.

"Children of a Lesser Clod" was written by Al Jean and directed by Mike Frank Polcino. Jean initially had multiple different storylines including Homer getting hurt, before he eventually pitched them all into this episode. During production, the staff members looked for an actual NBA player to appear with a shotgun during the first act, but no player accepted the role. The line when Milhouse says he knows Bart's dad better than Bart knows him is a reference to based on a real-life experience of producer Mike Reiss. During production the animators needed Ralph to get off screen for a two shot so they decided that Ralph followed a butterfly.

This episode was advertised as featuring Ron Howard, in what would have been his third appearance on The Simpsons (his first two appearances can be found in Season Ten's "When You Dish Upon a Star", and Season Eleven's "Hello Gutter, Hello Fadder"). Originally, the third act involved Homer getting all the kids in Howard's latest film, a Gladiator–like picture, hence the original title of the episode being "The Kids Stay In The Picture" (a play on the title of producer Robert Evans' The Kid Stays in the Picture).

However, Howard did not appear in this episode (in fact, no guest voices were used at all in this episode). The third act was about Homer winning the Good Guy Award, for caring for the neighbourhood kids. However, this was all until his own children show him as an unfit father.

When Homer puts his daycare permit in the picture frame Bart and Lisa gave him was based on a real-life experience of former writer Dana Gould in which he gave his parents a newspaper article about him winning a Boston comedy competition and later found out that it was replaced by Larry Bird dunking butterfingers. The third act did not initially include a police car chase and it was placed in after the table read. The scratches in Homer's day-care video were added to the animation in post-production.

== Cultural references ==
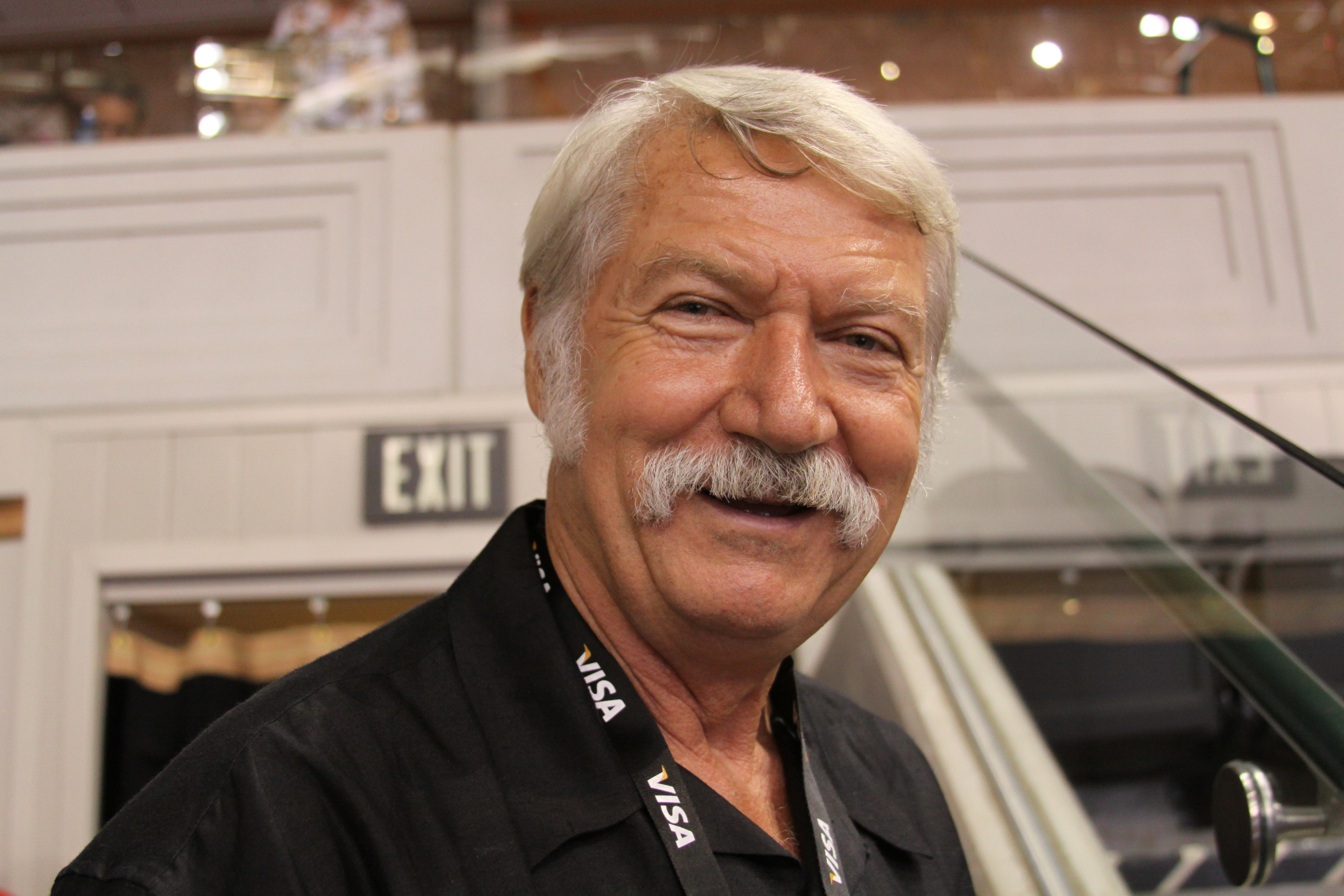
Lugash the weight trainer is a parody of Béla Károlyi.

The title is a spoof of the play Children of a Lesser God and the 1986 film based upon it. The episode features the original basket for basketball. Professor Frink's use of "Flubber" alludes to the 1997 film of the same name, and also references a scene from the film in which the main character (played by Robin Williams) jumps around a basketball court with the aid of Flubber-coated shoes. A reference of George Jetson was used in this episode while Homer hallucinates about taking a basketball shot in space. He even says "Jetson!" the way Mr. Spacely does. Lugash is a parody of Béla Károlyi. During the getaway scene, Ralph asks Homer "where are you taking us?", Homer replies "for frosty chocolate milkshakes!" This is a reference to one of Homer's old taglines from the shorts and Season 1.

== Internet reception ==
A short segment of the episode features Bill Cosby asking a child on his show Kids Say the Darndest Things about games he likes to play, to which the child promptly replies "Pokémon!" Cosby begins incoherently rambling about what Pokémon is whilst flapping his ears. This is an often-used parodied mannerism of Cosby's. Another similar gag was used in "Helter Shelter". In this episode, Pokémon is incorrectly pronounced "Pok-ee-mon". This is the second time Cosby has been parodied on The Simpsons. The first was "'Round Springfield".

This sequence involving Cosby's exaggerated mannerisms from this and other Simpsons episodes (as well as the Family Guy episode "Brian Does Hollywood") became an internet meme when many parodies on these particular segments became memes in their own right, especially on YouTube and YTMND.

A scene where Homer's festering scab wound heals over Ralph's hand in a close-up was negatively received by fans.

== Reception ==
Colin Jacobson of DVD Movie Guide gave this episode a mixed review, saying "When Bart and Lisa team up to pursue a goal, the result usually succeeds. And that’s true for “Clod” – at least to a moderate degree. Like most Season 12 episodes, the program doesn't become truly delightful, but it does more right than wrong, so it ends up as a decent success."
