= Simpsons Tall Tales =

- The Simpsons episode
- Episode no.: Season 12; Episode 21
- Directed by: Bob Anderson
- Written by: John Frink & Don Payne ("Paul Bunyan"); Bob Bendetson ("Connie Appleseed"); Matt Selman ("Tom and Huck")
- Production code: CABF17
- Original air date: May 20, 2001

Guest appearance
- Frank Welker as various animals

Episode features
- Chalkboard gag: "I should not be twenty-one by now"
- Couch gag: The living room is a subway station and the Simpsons enter an arriving train.
- Commentary: Mike Scully; Ian Maxtone-Graham; John Frink; Don Payne; Matt Selman; Tom Gammill; Max Pross; Bob Anderson; Joel H. Cohen

Episode chronology
← Previous "Children of a Lesser Clod"	Next → "Treehouse of Horror XII"
- The Simpsons season 12

"Simpsons Tall Tales" is the twenty-first and final episode of the twelfth season of the American animated television series The Simpsons. It originally aired on the Fox network in the United States on May 20, 2001. In the episode, Homer refuses to pay a five dollar airport tax to fly to Delaware, which forces the family to ride in a livestock car of a train instead. There they meet a singing hobo who tells three tall tales ("Paul Bunyan", "Connie Appleseed", and "Tom and Huck") which include Homer as Paul Bunyan, Lisa as Connie Appleseed (a female version of Johnny Appleseed) and Bart and Nelson as Tom Sawyer and Huckleberry Finn respectively.

"Simpsons Tall Tales" was directed by Bob Anderson and written by John Frink, Don Payne, Bob Bendetson and Matt Selman. The idea for the episode was pitched while the series' staff were coming up with story ideas for the twelfth season. The staff had noticed that viewers responded well to "Simpsons Bible Stories", and decided to write another trilogy episode because of the warm response.

The singing hobo in the episode was voiced by Hank Azaria. He was originally going to be voiced by Jim Carrey, but he dropped out due to his busy schedule.

In its original broadcast, the episode was seen by approximately 7.8 million viewers, finishing in 33rd place in the ratings the week it aired. Following its home video release, the episode received mixed reviews from critics.

== Plot ==
After the Simpsons win a trip to Delaware, Homer refuses to pay a $5 airport tax for his flight. After Homer violates the Anti-Fist Shaking Law, the family jumps onto a freight train where they meet a singing hobo who tells them three stories.

=== "Paul Bunyan" ===
Homer portrays Paul Bunyan, a giant who quickly becomes a great burden on the local townspeople, as he crushes their houses and greedily eats all their food. Eventually, the townspeople drug him and drag him out of their town. Out of loneliness, Bunyan carves a block of stone from the mountains into a blue ox that he calls Babe, who is rendered alive by the Northern Lights. In his travels with Babe, Homer creates several landmarks. Bunyan later meets a young woman, Marge, and though she is initially frightened of him, the two fall in love. When a meteor is soon to hit the town, the townspeople call Paul back to help them. Paul obliges and, after the meteor first hits and severely burns his backside, Paul throws the meteor towards Chicago, starting the Great Fire there.

After the hobo has told this story, he asks them for a sponge bath as compensation. Disgusted, Homer is forced to oblige, as nobody else will do so, but the hobo does not mind anyone seeing his nakedness.

=== "Connie Appleseed" ===
The hobo's second tall tale revolves around Lisa as Connie. Connie is part of a wagon train, and all of the travelers shoot and eat buffalo. Connie, who is against the practice, tries to urge them to stop slaughter or they will wipe out the buffalo, to much ridicule. She worries that no one is eating a renewable source of food and finds some apples for the pioneers to eat, but they reject them. Eventually, she changes her last name to "Appleseed", and leaves her family to journey across the United States and plant apple seeds wherever she goes. Meanwhile, the Simpsons change their surname to "Bufflekill" and they succeed in killing all the buffalo in the land. The travelers eventually starve, and just as they are about to cannibalize Homer, Connie returns and offers them apples instead. Won over by the taste of apples, they agree to the trade, sparing Homer.

=== "Tom and Huck" ===
The hobo's third tale tells the story of Tom Sawyer (Bart) and Huckleberry Finn (Nelson). Tom is a rebellious trouble maker while Huck is a bully. Huck is caught holding hands with Becky (Lisa) after he falls over in her garden from the fence and is forced to marry her by her father, Homer. During the ceremony, Huck switches places with a pig and goes on the run with Tom, leaving Missouri for Missoura. However, they are chased by townspeople led by Becky's father and their families. Huck and Tom flee to a river boat, but are thrown into the Mississippi River and are caught by the townspeople. The townspeople take them back to town and execute them before lowering their bodies into coffins.

=== Conclusion ===
The family arrives in Delaware and disembarks the train, but the hobo reminds them that they owe him one more sponge bath as compensation. Homer volunteers to stay behind to do the dirty work and promises to catch up with them in Wilmington.

== Production ==
On April 4, 1999, "Simpsons Bible Stories" aired in the United States. The episode, which contains three self-contained segments (Note: A fourth short segment with Homer as King Solomon is shown at the beginning of the episode's third segment. Still, executive producer and former showrunner Mike Scully has referred to "Simpsons Bible Stories" as the series' first official trilogy episode.) in which the Simpsons play different characters from the Bible, was written after Fox requested a Bible-themed episode that would air on Easter. The Simpsons' staff enjoyed writing the episode and it was generally well received by viewers. When pitching stories for the twelfth season, the writers decided to make another episode based around three segments that are all related to a certain theme.

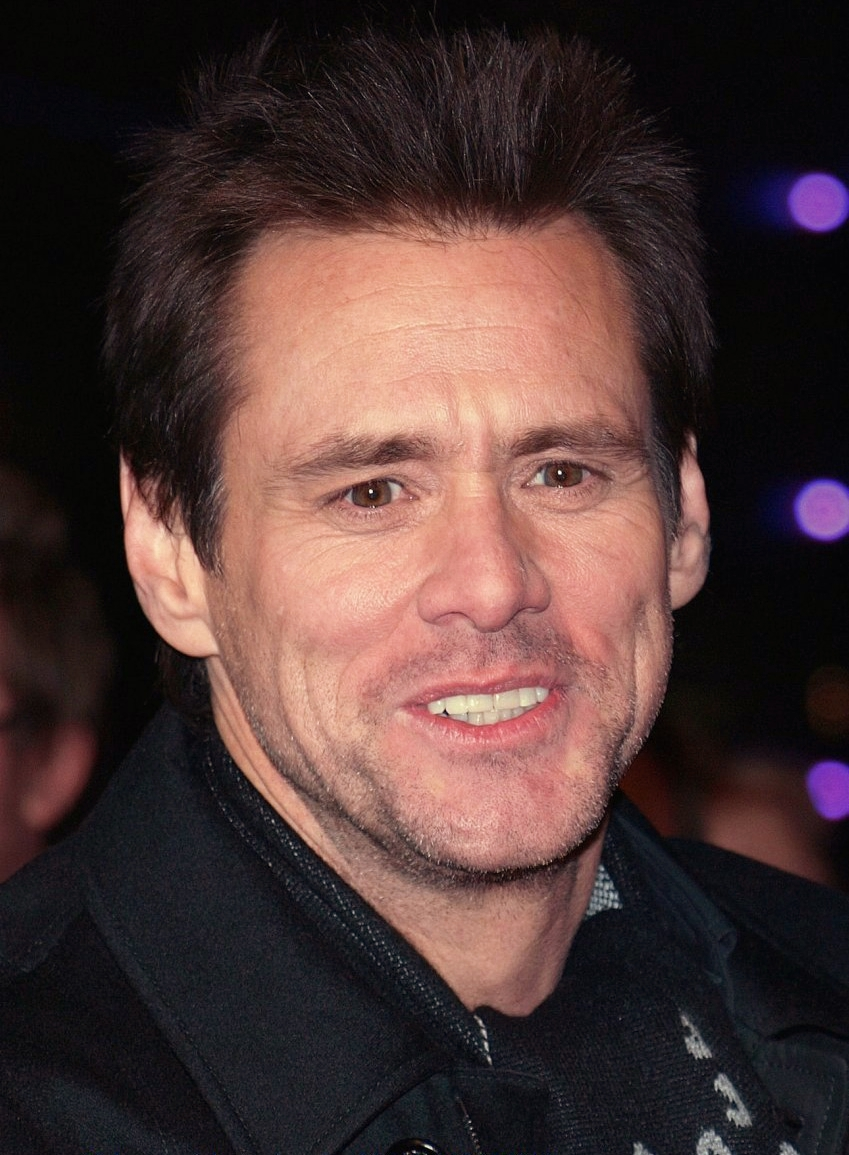
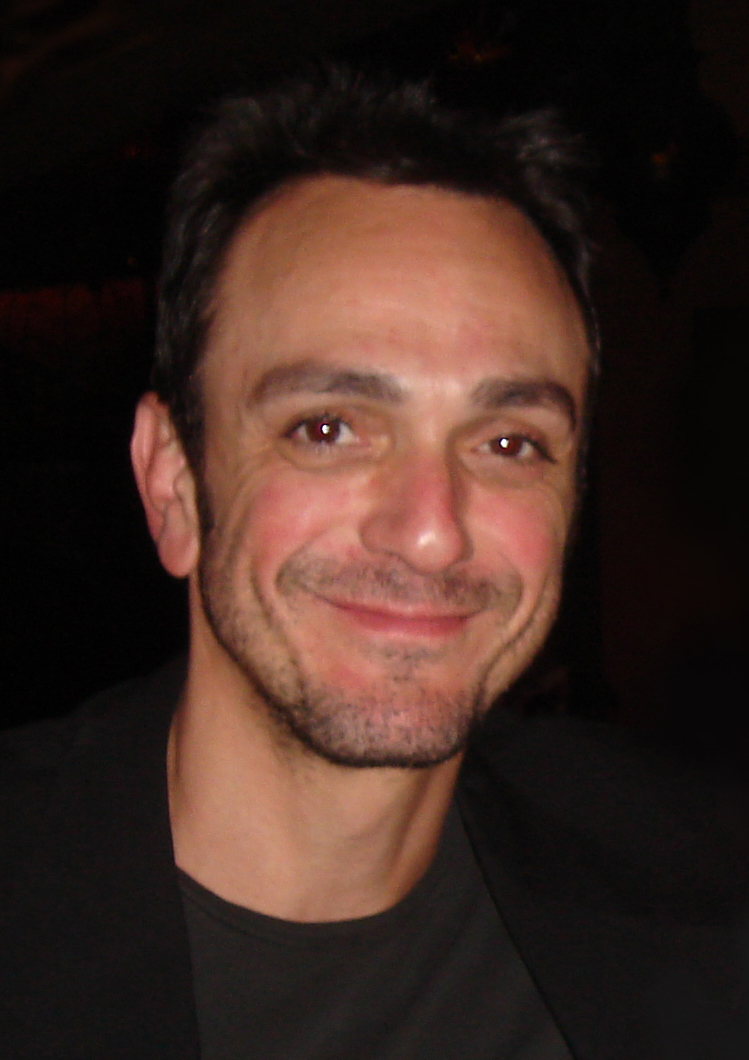
The singing hobo was originally to have been played by Jim Carrey (left), but because he was busy during the recording sessions, the role was given to Hank Azaria (right).

"Simpsons Tall Tales" was written by Matt Selman, John Frink, Don Payne, and Bob Bendetson. The idea for a trilogy episode based on tall tales was pitched by Frink and Payne, according to co-executive producer Ian Maxtone-Graham. While the episode's introduction was written and conceived by Selman, the first segment was written by Frink and Payne. The second and third segments were written by Bendetson and Selman respectively.

Writing segments for "Simpsons Tall Tales" was much different from normal episodes; for example, the writers only had one day to outline each segment's plot, and three to four days to write the first draft of each script, which is much less time than the writers usually get for an episode. Still, Selman has said that working on the episode was "very fun" for the writers. While writing the third segment, Selman listened to Adventures of Huckleberry Finn, Tom Sawyer Abroad and Tom Sawyer, Detective on tape to "get some of the lingo" that Mark Twain used in his books. He found so many unusual words in the books that he compiled a "giant" list of them. "We wanted to cram in every single [jargon from the books] as we could", Selman said in the episode's DVD commentary.

"Simpsons Tall Tales" was directed by Bob Anderson and is one of his favorite episodes that he directed. Because the segments take place in different places and time periods, the animators had to create new designs for characters and backgrounds. Even though it took a lot of work, Anderson maintained that the episode was "fun to work on."

In a scene in the episode, Moe holds a giant pill that makes Homer fall asleep - at one point in the episode's production, the pill would read "Roofie", but it was eventually removed. Another scene that changed during production was the scene in which Homer uses Marge's hair to clean him up for their date. After he takes Marge's hair out of his ear, her hair would originally be covered with earwax, but it was removed when the animators looked over the episode's storyboard. The second segment originally had many more shots of buffalo being shot, but some were changed so that the deaths were off-camera.

The singing hobo was voiced by regular cast member Hank Azaria, who voices Moe and Comic Book Guy among other characters in the series. Originally, the part would be played by Canadian-American actor and comedian Jim Carrey, who had asked for a role in an episode. Because Carrey was busy with other projects and did not have time to record any lines, the role was instead given to Azaria, who Scully said did a "great job". While most of the hobo's songs were written by Frink, the song that the hobo sings at the beginning of the episode was written by executive producer and former showrunner Mike Reiss. The dialog between Homer and the hobo at the end of the episode was ad-libbed by Azaria and Dan Castellaneta, who portrays Homer in the series.

Like many other trilogy episodes, "Simpsons Tall Tales" ended up very long and the staff were obliged to cut some scenes in order to fit with the program's maximum running time. The scene in which Homer first meets Babe was also cut short; originally, it would show Babe kicking Homer in the crotch after Homer says that he will "whip [Babe] from dawn to dusk." A similar joke was later used in The Simpsons Movie. The last removed scene was from the episode's third segment. It would show Lenny and Carl eating buffalo meat, while Carl speaks like a stereotypical Native American.

== Cultural references ==
"Simpsons Tall Tales" has been described as a "skewed" retelling of old tales. The beginning of the episode shows the family winning a trip to Delaware. This is a reference to the end of "Behind the Laughter", in which Homer is seen watching an episode of The Simpsons wherein the family is visiting Delaware.

The first segment is based on the mythological lumberjack Paul Bunyan, who carved Babe the Blue ox out of the Blue Mountains. The second segment shows Lisa as Connie Appleseed, a female version of the American pioneer nurseryman Johnny Appleseed who introduced apple trees to large parts of Ohio, Indiana, and Illinois. "Tom and Huck" features Bart as Tom Sawyer and Nelson as Huckleberry Finn, both of whom are characters in Mark Twain's 1876 novel The Adventures of Tom Sawyer. Despite the episode's title, only the first two segments are actually tall tales.

This is referenced in the episode, when Lisa says "That's not tall tale, it's a book by Mark Twain." In the first segment, Paul Bunyan and Babe fight Rodan, a fictional Japanese mutated pterosaur introduced in the 1956 tokusatsu film Rodan. When showering Marge with stuffed animals, Bunyan accidentally drops a guard next to her. When noticing the guard, Bunyan tugs his collar in a similar way as American comedian Charles Nelson Reilly. In the third segment, Dr Hibbert can be heard singing the 1927 song "Ol' Man River".

== Reception ==
In order to boost ratings, two earlier broadcast episodes (including "Treehouse of Horror XI") were shown before the episode. In its original American broadcast on May 20, 2001, "Simpsons Tall Tales" received a 7.6 rating, according to Nielsen Media Research, translating to approximately 7.8 million viewers. The episode finished in 33rd place in the ratings for the week of May 14-20, 2001. On August 18, 2009, the episode was released as part of a DVD set called The Simpsons: The Complete Twelfth Season. Mike Scully, Ian Maxtone-Graham, John Frink, Don Payne, Carolyn Omine, Matt Selman, Tom Gammill, Max Pross, Bob Anderson and Joel H. Cohen participated in the audio commentary for the episode.

Since its home video release, "Simpsons Tall Tales" received mixed reviews from critics.

In his review of The Simpsons: The Complete Twelfth Season, Colin Jacobson of DVD Movie Guide disliked the episode. He argued that the episode is similar to the season 10 episode "Simpsons Bible Stories", in that they both "feel a little heavy on cutesy and low on comedic inspiration." Although he found some parts of the episode amusing, he summarized it as overall being lackluster.

DVD Talk's Casey Burchby described "Simpsons Tall Tales" as the season's worst episode. As with most other trilogy episodes, "Simpsons Tall Tales" "did not work" for Burchby, who found that the gags were either boring or too far between. He also argued that "Simpsons Tall Tales" and trilogy episodes in general are an excuse for the series' writers to not have to come up with new stories for the characters. "It's understandable that after eleven years, a show might have trouble continuing to come up with original material for the same five characters, but the anthology episodes come across as rather transparent attempts to avoid that challenge", he wrote.

On the other hand, DVD Verdict's Mac MacEntire argued that "Simpsons Tall Tales" is one of the season's best episodes. He wrote that the episode is "filled with great gags", including the hobo's sponge bath and Bart and Nelson's discussion about "backtacks" and "tackbacks".
