= Blame It on Lisa =

- The Simpsons episode
- Episode no.: Season 13; Episode 15
- Directed by: Steven Dean Moore
- Written by: Bob Bendetson
- Production code: DABF10
- Original air date: March 31, 2002

Episode features
- Couch gag: The Simpsons are marionettes that get tangled in each others' strings. The camera tilts up to reveal Matt Groening as the puppet master.
- Commentary: Matt Groening; Al Jean; Matt Selman; Tim Long; John Frink; Don Payne; Joel H. Cohen; Steven Dean Moore; Matt Warburton; David Silverman; Mike B. Anderson

Episode chronology
← Previous "Tales from the Public Domain"	Next → "Weekend at Burnsie's"
- The Simpsons season 13

"Blame It on Lisa" is the fifteenth episode of the thirteenth season of the American animated television series The Simpsons.

Written by Bob Bendetson and directed by Steven Dean Moore, "Blame It on Lisa" features several references to popular culture, including a parody of the Brazilian children's television host Xuxa and an allusion to the film A Trip to the Moon. When it originally aired on the Fox network in the United States on March 31, 2002, it was seen by around eleven million people. In 2010, the episode was released on DVD and Blu-ray along with the rest of the episodes of the thirteenth season.

"Blame It on Lisa" attracted controversy in Brazil because of its inclusion of clichés and stereotypes, including frequent depictions of crime, slums and rat infestations, as well as cultural inaccuracies. Riotur, the tourist board of Rio de Janeiro, planned on taking legal action against Fox for damaging the international image of the city. James L. Brooks, executive producer of The Simpsons, soon issued an apology to Rio de Janeiro.

== Plot ==
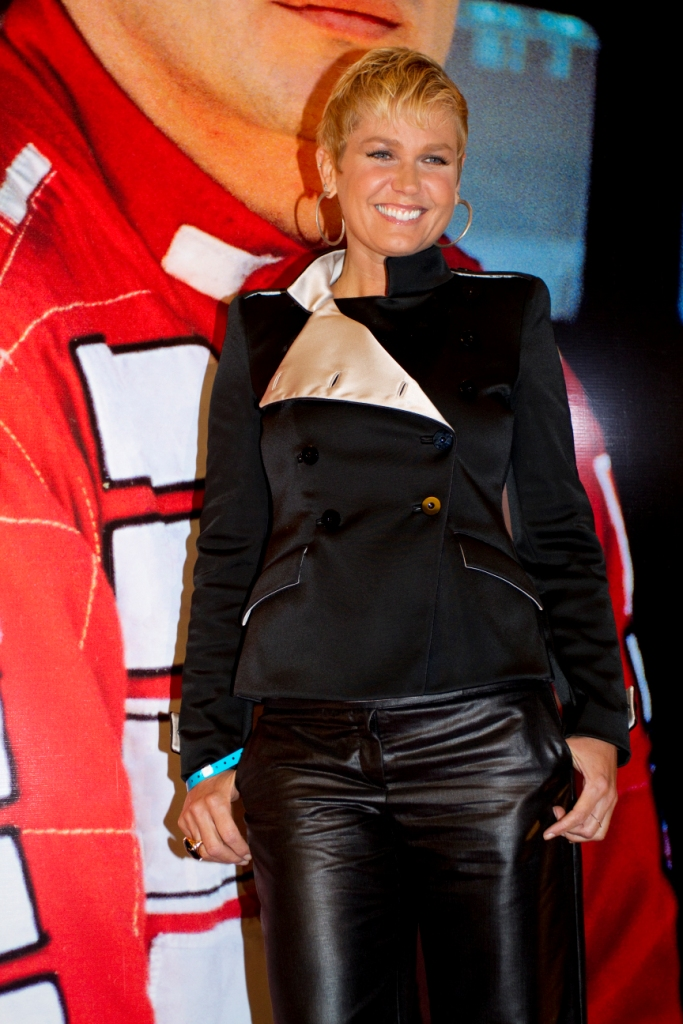
Xuxa Meneghel is parodied in the episode by character Xoxchitla.

Marge discovers that the Simpson family has run up a $400.00 telephone bill due to a call to Brazil. After the phone company cuts off the family's service for non-payment and Homer repeatedly injures himself trying to restore it, Lisa admits that she made the call in order to stay in touch with Ronaldo, an orphan boy she has been sponsoring. She had been receiving monthly letters from him until recently; when they stopped, she called the orphanage where he was staying and was told that he had gone missing. When Lisa plays a videotaped message from Ronaldo, telling her that he used her money to buy a pair of dancing shoes, Homer, Marge, and Bart decide to fly to Brazil with her and find him. They leave Maggie in the care of Patty and Selma.

Once the Simpsons arrive in Rio de Janeiro, they begin searching for Ronaldo—first in the city's slums, then at his orphanage—but without success. When they split into pairs to cover more ground, Homer and Bart are robbed by a gang of children and later kidnapped in a taxicab. Bart escapes to tell Marge and Lisa, and the kidnappers take Homer to a hideout within the Brazilian rainforest and demand $50,000.00 for his release. Unable to pay the ransom themselves or to borrow the money from anyone in Springfield, the remaining three Simpsons begin looking for Homer. They get caught up in a Carnaval parade, during which Lisa finds Ronaldo—now working as a flamingo-costumed dancer on a popular children's television program. He explains that the shoes he bought led to this job and a high salary, and gives the Simpsons the $50,000.00 they need, noting that he keeps all his earnings since he has no parents who can steal from him.

When they arrive at a meeting point arranged by the kidnappers—on adjacent aerial lift cars above Sugarloaf Mountain—they find that Homer has developed Stockholm syndrome and made a scrapbook to remember his kidnapping. They throw the money across and Homer jumps to the family's car, only for the cables to break and send them tumbling down the mountainside. They survive unharmed, and Homer thanks his family for being there to get him out of trouble. Bart is immediately swallowed whole by an anaconda, but is not troubled and begins dancing to samba music.

== Production ==
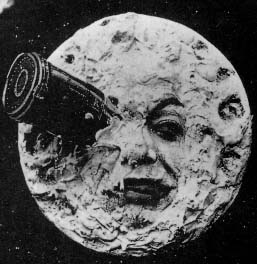
The episode references the 1902 film A Trip to the Moon.

"Blame It on Lisa" was written by Bob Bendetson and directed by Steven Dean Moore as part of the thirteenth season of The Simpsons (2001–2002). For the scenes taking place in Brazil, the animators based much of their work on photographs taken by a staff member who had previously visited the country. This episode is not the first in which the Simpsons travel to a location outside of the United States. Throughout the series, they have visited Antarctica, Aruba, Australia, Canada, China, Costa Rica, Cuba, Denmark, France, Iceland, India, Ireland, Israel, Italy, Japan, Mexico, the Netherlands, Peru, South Korea, Spain, Tanzania and the United Kingdom. Their visit to Brazil in "Blame It on Lisa" was later referenced in the eighteenth-season episode "The Wife Aquatic" (2007), in which the family makes a trip to an island called Barnacle Bay that they discover has been devastated by overfishing. Lisa says to Bart: "This is the most disgusting place we've ever gone," to which Bart asks: "What about Brazil?" Lisa corrects herself, responding: "After Brazil."

Several references to popular culture are included in the episode. The title "Blame It on Lisa" refers to the 1984 film Blame It on Rio, which also takes place in Brazil. As Homer and Bart walk on Copacabana Beach, the famous 1939 song "Aquarela do Brasil" (also known as "Brazil") is played. ABCDEF is a parody of the children's television series Xuxa that attracted complaints because of the revealing outfits worn by the host, Brazilian actress and singer Xuxa. "Teleboobies", Bart's nickname for ABCDEF, is a reference to the British television series Teletubbies. The Itchy & Scratchy cartoon that Homer and Bart watch at the beginning of the episode parodies Georges Méliès's 1902 film A Trip to the Moon; Itchy and Scratchy are playing golf when Itchy hits Scratchy's head with his golf club, sending his head crashing into the Man in the Moon as the rocket does in the film. According to showrunner Al Jean, the staff members of The Simpsons asked American golfer Tiger Woods to do a guest appearance in this cartoon, but they were turned down.

== Release ==
In its original broadcast on the Fox network in the United States on March 31, 2002, "Blame It on Lisa" received a 6.3 Nielsen rating and was seen by approximately eleven million people. The episode finished forty-third in the ratings for the week of March 25–31, 2002, tying with a new episode of the comedy series George Lopez and the news program 48 Hours. In addition, it became the highest-rated program on Fox that week. On August 24, 2010, "Blame It on Lisa" was released on DVD and Blu-ray as part of the box set The Simpsons – The Complete Thirteenth Season. Staff members Steven Dean Moore, Al Jean, Matt Groening, Matt Selman, Tim Long, John Frink, Don Payne, Joel H. Cohen, Matt Warburton, David Silverman, and Mike B. Anderson participated in the DVD audio commentary for the episode.

Bendetson was nominated for a Writers Guild of America Award in the animation category for his work on the episode, but lost to Ken Keeler, the writer of the Futurama episode "Godfellas".

Reception of "Blame It on Lisa" from television critics has been mixed. Casey Broadwater of Blu-ray.com cited it as the best episode of the season. DVD Movie Guide's Colin Jacobson argued that it was not as funny as some of the other episodes that have poked fun at nations. He added that the episode "musters the occasional laugh, and like much of [season thirteen], it's not a bad show, but it's not a memorable one either." DVD Verdict's Jennifer Malkowski cited the scrapbook Homer made of his kidnapping memories as the highlight of the episode.

=== Reaction in Brazil ===
"Blame It on Lisa" was met with a negative reception in Brazil shortly after its broadcast in the United States. According to The Washington Post, "an immediate media frenzy was born" as the episode started receiving coverage in local newspapers and news programs on Brazilian television. An article published in the Houston Chronicle on April 8, 2002, stated that critics in the country were upset by the inclusion of clichés and stereotypes not related to Brazil, such as Brazilians having Spanish accents and wearing mustaches. The general Brazilian perception was that the episode mixed up their culture with that of surrounding Spanish-speaking Latin American countries. Alex Bellos, The Guardian's correspondent in Brazil, commented that one of the things upsetting the Brazilians was the many inaccuracies featured in the episode, such as the conga and the macarena supposedly being popular dances in Brazil; the conga is actually a Caribbean dance, and the macarena does not come from Brazil nor is it frequently performed there. Roberto Pereira, an official at the city's Center of Sexual Education, stated to the foreign press association. "Americans think we are inferior, ignorant, perverted, dirty animals!"

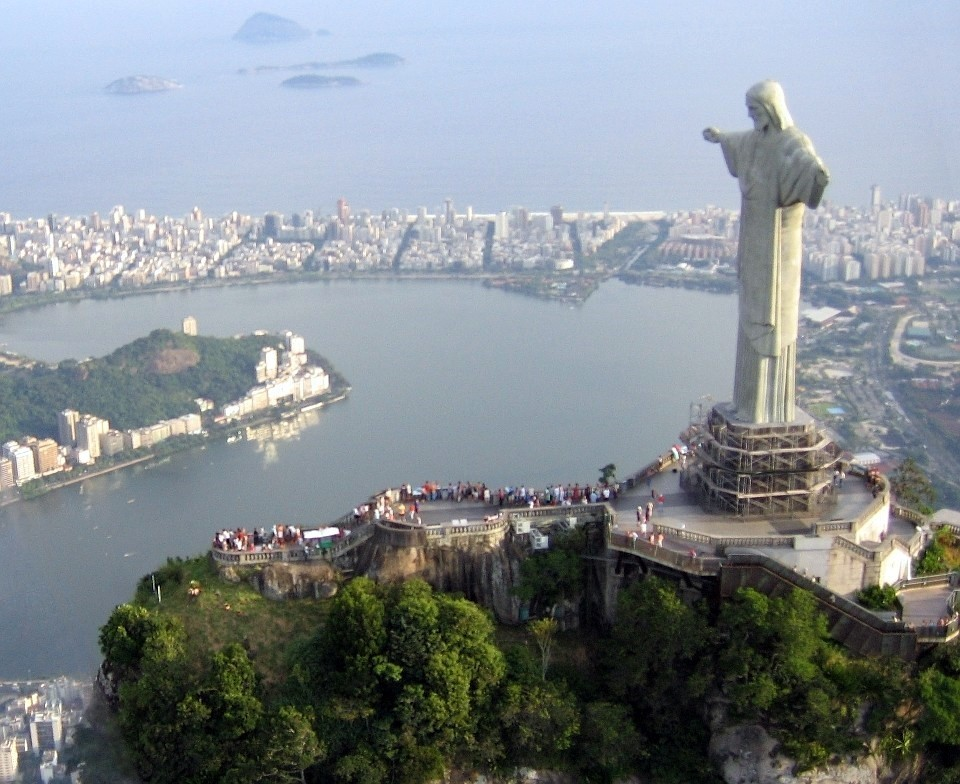
Riotur, the tourist board for Rio de Janeiro planned on suing the Fox network for damaging the city's international image.

On April 6, 2002, it was reported by the Brazilian media that Riotur, the tourist board of Rio de Janeiro, was planning on suing Fox for damaging the international image of the city. Riotur stated that Rio de Janeiro was portrayed in "Blame It on Lisa" as having rampant street crime, kidnappings, slums, and a rat infestation, and it was thought that this would discourage foreign visitors from visiting the city. Over a period of three years up to the airing of "Blame It on Lisa" in the United States, Riotur had spent US$18 million on a campaign to attract tourists to Rio de Janeiro, and believed the campaign would be undermined by the portrayal of the city in the episode. Riotur's planned lawsuit was supported by the Brazilian government, with president Fernando Henrique Cardoso stating that the episode "brought a distorted vision of Brazilian reality".

Martin Kaste, South America correspondent for National Public Radio, reported on April 9, 2002, that since their announcement that they were going to sue Fox, the Riotur officials had been told by their lawyers in the United States that doing so there would be difficult because of the First Amendment to the United States Constitution, which protects freedom of speech. The Simpsons executive producer James L. Brooks soon issued a statement saying: "We apologize to the lovely city and people of Rio de Janeiro. And if that doesn't settle the issue, Homer Simpson offers to take on the president of Brazil on Fox's Celebrity Boxing." Spokespersons for Fox told the press that they had not received nearly as much criticism with previous episodes that poked fun at other nations. Showrunner Al Jean has said in an interview that "Every other place has had a good sense of humor. Brazil caught us by surprise." When "Blame It on Lisa" eventually aired in Brazil in December 2002, there was a statement at the beginning noting that Fox is not responsible for the vision of the producers behind the episode.

A later episode, "You Don't Have to Live Like a Referee", has the family visiting Brazil again.
