= Homer Alone =

- The Simpsons episode
- Episode no.: Season 3 Episode 15
- Directed by: Mark Kirkland
- Written by: David M. Stern
- Production code: 8F14
- Original air date: February 6, 1992

Guest appearance
- Phil Hartman as Troy McClure

Episode features
- Chalkboard gag: "I will not spank others"
- Couch gag: The family forms a pyramid
- Commentary: Matt Groening; Al Jean; Dan Castellaneta; Julie Kavner; Mark Kirkland; Brad Bird

Episode chronology
← Previous "Lisa the Greek"	Next → "Bart the Lover"
- The Simpsons season 3

"Homer Alone" is the fifteenth episode of the third season of the American animated television series The Simpsons, and the fiftieth episode overall. It originally aired on Fox in the United States on February 6, 1992. In the episode, stress from household chores and her family's demands causes Marge to suffer from a nervous breakdown, so she vacations alone at a spa. She leaves Bart and Lisa with Patty and Selma; Maggie stays at home with Homer but leaves home looking for her mother, causing Homer to frantically search for her.

The episode was written by David M. Stern and directed by Mark Kirkland. Stern had noticed that most of the writers were pitching stories about Bart and Homer, and he thought a "deeper vein of comedy" could be reached by having Marge suffer from a nervous breakdown. Originally, Marge's trip was to a distressed mother's institute rather than a spa. However, the plot was not well received at the table read for the episode and much of it was rewritten. The episode's title references the film Home Alone, which starred David Stern's brother Daniel.

"Homer Alone" contains references to the Wile E. Coyote and Road Runner cartoons, Thelma and Louise, Home Alone, MacGyver, and the song "Baby Come Back" by Player. The episode has received generally positive reviews from critics. During its original airing on Fox during February sweeps, it acquired a 14.2 Nielsen rating.

== Plot ==
Marge is exhausted from cleaning up after her family and running errands. Bart and Lisa miss their bus to school, forcing Marge to drive them. They fight on the back seat, putting Marge on edge. After buying groceries and failing to get Homer's bowling ball flushed, Marge hears DJs Bill and Marty make a cruel prank call during their radio show. When Maggie pulls the lid off her baby bottle, splattering milk everywhere, Marge suffers a nervous breakdown and blocks traffic by parking her car across both lanes of a bridge. When the police are unable to convince her to move, Homer persuades her to surrender with the offer of a romantic "snuggle", and she is arrested. Since the town's women sympathize with Marge's plight, Mayor Quimby orders her release over Chief Wiggum's objections.

Marge decides to take a vacation by herself to a health spa called Rancho Relaxo. She leaves Bart and Lisa with Patty and Selma; since Maggie is scared of Patty and Selma, she ends up staying at home with Homer. Marge enjoys her much-needed rest while the rest of the family find it hard to adapt to life without her. Homer finds himself lonely and unable to care for Maggie. Bart and Lisa dislike living with Patty and Selma because they snore loudly, watch MacGyver and Divorce Court, and serve meals of tongue sandwiches, Clamato, Mr. Pibb and soy milk.

Upset by her mother's absence, Maggie leaves the house to find Marge. When Homer and Barney are unable to find her, Homer calls a missing baby hotline. Maggie is found atop the roof of an ice cream shop (whose mascot resembled Marge) and returned to Homer as Marge leaves the spa. Marge finds her forlorn and disheveled family waiting for her on a train platform when she arrives home. While Homer and the kids are sleeping next to her that night, Marge tells them she needs their help around the house; they assure her she has nothing to worry about.

== Production ==
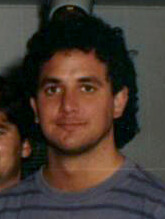
David M. Stern wrote the episode.

"Homer Alone" was written by David M. Stern. He had noticed that most of the writers were pitching stories about Bart and Homer, and he thought a "deeper vein of comedy" could be reached by having Marge suffer from a nervous breakdown. Executive producer James L. Brooks immediately approved the idea. Originally, Marge's trip was to a distressed mother's institute so they could show "what made Marge tick". However, the plot was not well received at the table read for the episode. The writers then re-wrote much of the episode, switching the institute to a spa. They also added a video appearance from Troy McClure (Phil Hartman). According to executive producer Al Jean, the writers often used McClure as a "panic button" when they felt an episode needed more humor.

The episode was directed by Mark Kirkland. The scene at the train station where Marge leaves for Rancho Relaxo includes a brief cameo appearance of a character modeled after Simpsons director Jim Reardon. Reardon dislikes flying, and took trains whenever possible, so the animators always tried to include him in scenes at a train station. Susie Dietter served as assistant director for the episode and animated several of the scenes for the subplot with Bart, Lisa, Patty and Selma. In a scene where Homer sings a song to Maggie, he was designed to look disheveled because the writers had wanted him to look drunk, although no attention was called to it.

== Cultural references ==
The title is a play on Home Alone (1990); David Stern's brother Daniel had starred in the movie as one of the main antagonists. A scene in the episode where Homer screams with his hands on his cheeks is also a reference to Home Alone where the eight year old Kevin McCallister (Macaulay Culkin) screams with his hands on his cheeks. The opening where Homer chases Bart is a reference to the Warner Bros./Chuck Jones Wile E. Coyote and Road Runner cartoons. The scene freezes, during which Bart and Homer's scientific names are given as Brat'us Don'thaveacow'us and Homo Neanderthal'us respectively. The background in the sequence references the Hanna–Barbera tradition of using backgrounds over and over and making it look like there is an "endless living room". The scene where Marge is booked in prison references the Coen brothers film Raising Arizona.

The song that plays while Homer is on hold on the missing child hotline is "Baby Come Back" by Player. One of the films available at Rancho Relaxo is Thelma and Louise, which Marge watches. "Homer Alone" is the first episode of The Simpsons that shows Patty's and Selma's fondness for MacGyver, and Selma says "Richard Dean Anderson will be in my dreams tonight."

== Reception ==
In its original airing on February 6, 1992, on Fox during February sweeps, the episode acquired a 14.2 Nielsen rating and was viewed in approximately 13.08 million homes. It finished 25th in the ratings for the week of February 3–9, 1992, up from the season's average rank of 37th. The Simpsons was the highest rated show on Fox that week.

Since airing, the episode has received generally positive reviews from critics. The authors of the book I Can't Believe It's a Bigger and Better Updated Unofficial Simpsons Guide, Gary Russell and Gareth Roberts, wrote, "After the first few minutes, this episode becomes less about Marge than the family's reliance on her. Bart and Lisa's torturous time at Patty and Selma's is wonderful ... but it's Homer losing Maggie, and working out what to tell Marge upon her return, that provides the best jokes."

DVD Movie Guide's Colin Jacobson felt that the episode "comes close to finding the series in a rut, as it sort of offers another iteration of the 'Homer's a bad father' theme. However, the emphasis on Marge's issues makes it different, and it's also fun to see life at Patty and Selma's place. It's another solid show." Nate Meyers of Digitally Obsessed rated the episode a 3 (of 5), writing "The episode serves only to demonstrate what is already obvious: that Marge holds the family together. It's entertaining to see Homer struggle with the most basic of parenting skills, but this happens at the expense of all the other episodes this season that show him to be a good father (albeit flawed). Still, it's nice to see Marge get her own show."
