= David M. Stern =

American television screenwriter

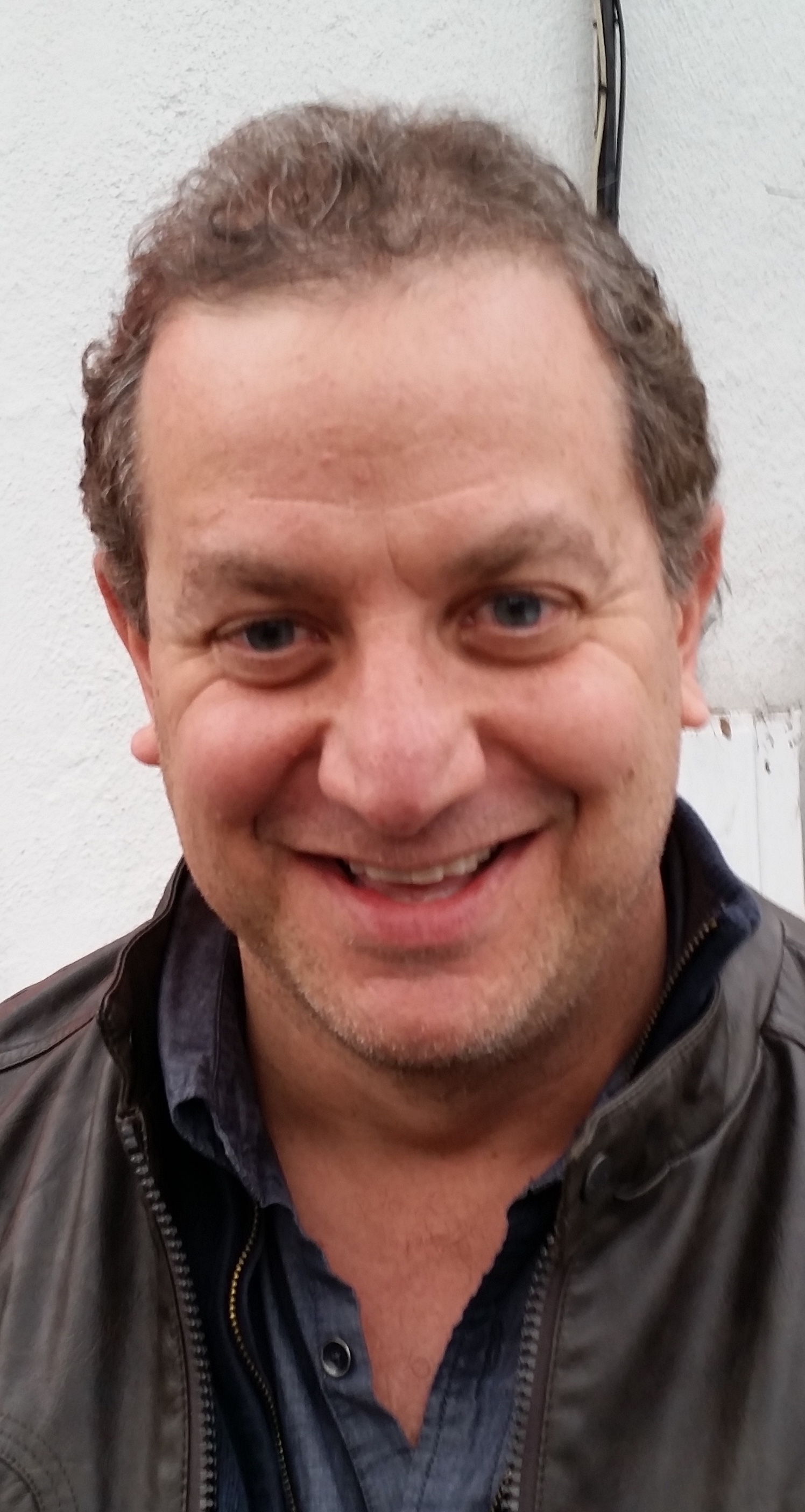
- Stern in Ithaca, New York, in February 2016
- Occupation: Screenwriter
- Known for: The Wonder Years, The Simpsons, and Ugly Americans
- Relatives: Daniel Stern (brother); Henry Stern (nephew)

David Michael Stern is an American television screenwriter. Among his first work in television was writing episodes of The Wonder Years in the late 1980s. He then proceeded to write several episodes of The Simpsons in the 1990s. In 2010, he developed the animated television series Ugly Americans. Stern is the younger brother of actor Daniel Stern, who narrated and directed The Wonder Years.

== Career ==
=== Early work ===
Stern worked as a production assistant on the 1988 film Mystic Pizza. In a 2010 interview with TV.com, he revealed: "That was one of my first gigs in LA. I was shocked they gave me a credit because I lasted a week and then got canned. I was a runner, and they told me to go pick up this producer at San Vicente and something, and it turns out there are two San Vicentes in Los Angeles, and I had gone to the wrong one. They gave the assignment of picking up the most important producer on the movie to a guy who had just arrived in LA two weeks before."

Stern got his writing break on the television comedy-drama The Wonder Years, where he was an executive story consultant and wrote eight episodes from 1988 to 1990. He has said in an interview that "I was struggling when I got my break on The Wonder Years; I like to remember it all happening like, "Cut to the next scene." There's an awful lot of blood and sweat in there, me doing massive rewrites on drafts of Wonder Years scripts on a typewriter, with less time than I've ever had in my life. I conveniently forget all that." Stern was nominated for a 1989 Primetime Emmy Award in the "Outstanding Writing for a Comedy Series" category for writing the episode "Loosiers" but lost to Diane English of Murphy Brown. He was also nominated for a Humanitas Prize in the "30 Minute Category" for writing the episode "The Powers That Be".

=== The Simpsons ===
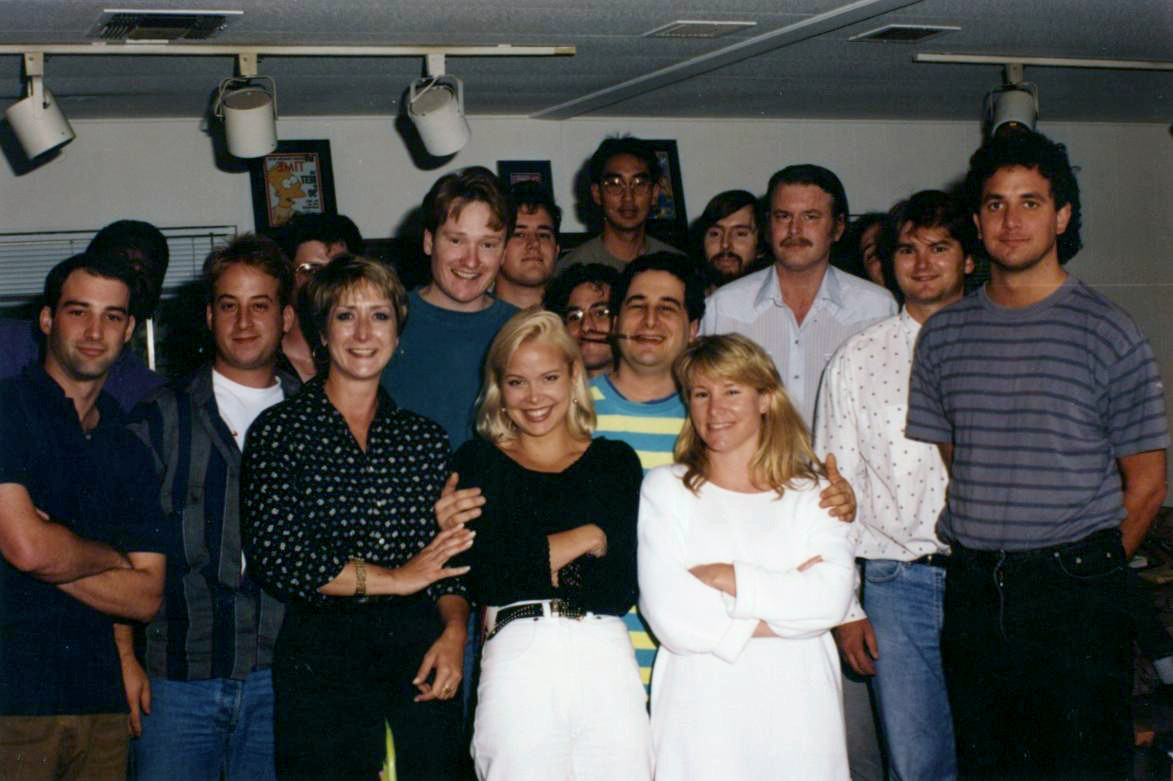
Stern (farthest right) and other members of the Simpsons writing staff in 1992

Stern then joined the writing staff of the animated television sitcom The Simpsons. He told TV.com that when he "went from The Wonder Years to The Simpsons, I could not believe how much story they were packing into each episode. It taught me not to hold on to story—get the fun out of it and move on." During his time on that show, he particularly liked writing the character Marge Simpson and her twin-sisters Patty and Selma Bouvier, and therefore wrote several episodes revolving around them. Executive producer Mike Reiss said on the audio commentary for Stern's season two episode "Principal Charming" (1991) that none of the staff members could relate on a personal level to the twins, but Stern "seemed to really hook in to them, so he did some great episodes featuring members of the Bouvier family."

"Homer Alone" (1992), which aired during the show's third season, was one of Stern's episodes that focused on Marge. At the time, he had noticed that most of the writers were pitching stories about Bart and Homer, and he thought a "deeper vein of comedy" could be reached by having Marge suffer from a nervous breakdown. During the show's fourth season, Stern wrote the episode "Selma's Choice" (1993), in which Selma decides she wants a baby. He wanted to go back to a "Patty and Selma episode" because he enjoyed "Principal Charming" and thought it was important to "keep these characters alive." In 1999, Stern was nominated for a Primetime Emmy Award in the "Outstanding Animated Program (for Programming Less Than One Hour)" category for writing the season ten episode "Viva Ned Flanders", but lost to the episode "And They Call It Bobby Love" of King of the Hill. Stern's last writing credit to date on The Simpsons was the season twenty-eight episode "Kamp Krustier" (2017).

=== Further work ===
Stern was co-executive producer for the comedy drama detective television series Monk in 2002, and the sitcom Oliver Beene in 2004. In 2010, Stern developed the animated television series Ugly Americans that airs on Comedy Central and is based on a web series called 5ON. The series revolves around a social worker employed by the Department of Integration in an alternate reality version of New York City inhabited by monsters and other creatures. Stern has commented that "Dan Powell, who had put together the 5ON thing, contacted me because he liked a particular Simpsons script I wrote ["Duffless"]. I saw how I could keep the show grounded, but still make it expansive enough through this crazy world that I wouldn't get freaked out on episode three that I was out of stories. That's my biggest nightmare. If you're trying to create 100 episodes, you need to know you can go forever."

Stern has commented that he considers Ugly Americans to be "a dream job, to write a limitless show where we can make anything happen. As long as it makes us laugh and makes other people laugh, I think that really is the dream." He has also noted that on the show, "We [the staff] have a lot of horror comedy elements that I don't see anywhere else. I wrote for The Simpsons for a few years, and Treehouse of Horror was always the highlight of the year, but I always sort of wanted more of that. But because of the structure of The Simpsons, it wasn't really possible, being it was so specifically based on this grounded family."

== Personal life ==
Stern is the brother of actor Daniel Stern, who provided the narrating adult voice of the main character Kevin Arnold on The Wonder Years. The Simpsons episode "Three Men and a Comic Book" features a The Wonder Years parody, in which Bart stares into the distance after realizing that he has to get his first job, and an older version of Bart's voice is heard saying: "I didn't realize it at the time, but a little piece of my childhood had slipped away forever that day." Daniel Stern guest starred in the episode as the voice of the adult Bart, and David M. Stern helped the writers get the idioms and the wording of the parody right.

He is Jewish.
