= Jackie Bouvier =

Jackie Bouvier is the name of:

- Jacqueline Kennedy Onassis (née Bouvier) (1929–1994), American political-family member and editor
- Jacqueline Ingrid Bouvier, a fictional character from The Simpsons
