= Selma's Choice =

- The Simpsons episode
- Episode no.: Season 4 Episode 13
- Directed by: Carlos Baeza
- Written by: David M. Stern
- Production code: 9F11
- Original air date: January 21, 1993

Guest appearances
- Phil Hartman as Lionel Hutz, Troy McClure, Duff Gardens commercial announcer, and park security guards

Episode features
- Chalkboard gag: "I will not yell 'she's dead' during roll call"
- Couch gag: The Simpson family is caught by a net on the ground.
- Commentary: Matt Groening; Al Jean; Mike Reiss; David M. Stern; Jim Reardon

Episode chronology
← Previous "Marge vs. the Monorail"	Next → "Brother from the Same Planet"
- The Simpsons season 4

"Selma's Choice" is the thirteenth episode of the fourth season of the American animated television series The Simpsons. It originally aired on Fox in the United States on January 21, 1993. In the episode, Selma decides to have a baby, inspired by her late aunt's advice that she not spend her life alone. She experiences what life with children is like by taking Bart and Lisa to the Duff Gardens amusement park, which does not go as planned.

The episode was written by David M. Stern and directed by Carlos Baeza.

== Plot ==
On the day that Homer, Bart, and Lisa plan to go to the amusement park Duff Gardens, Marge tells them that her aunt Gladys has died, and the family must attend Gladys's funeral instead. On their way to the funeral home, the family picks up Marge's sisters, Patty and Selma.

Following the funeral, the family watches Gladys's video will, in which she advises Patty and Selma not to die alone like she did. Selma is particularly affected and decides she wants a child. Attempting to find a suitable partner, Selma tries video dating, a love potion, and flirting with a teenage grocery store cashier. She then goes on a date with blind geriatric Hans Moleman, but decides she would not want children with him. Selma briefly considers artificial insemination.

When Homer gets food poisoning from eating an expired hoagie, Marge arranges for Selma to take Bart and Lisa to Duff Gardens while she stays home to look after Homer. At Duff Gardens, Bart and Lisa run amok and eventually end up in the park's security office with Selma. Meanwhile, Homer starts to feel better, and he and Marge enjoy their day alone. Returning Bart and Lisa home, the exhausted Selma asks Homer how he manages to raise kids every day. Deciding she does not need to have children to be happy, Selma adopts Jub-Jub, Gladys' pet iguana, for companionship.

== Production ==
Writer David Stern said he wanted to go back to a "Patty and Selma episode", because it was sustained so well when he wrote "Principal Charming". He thought it was important to "keep these characters (Patty and Selma) alive." The animators had trouble with the size of the characters' pupils during the season. In this episode, they are noticeably larger. Julie Kavner did five voices in the scene where the family watches the video will. The scene of Great Aunt Gladys showing off her collection of potato chips was inspired by Myrtle Young, who appeared on The Tonight Show Starring Johnny Carson. Young said she was working in quality control at a potato chip factory, and collected potato chips that looked like, amongst other things, celebrities. The scene where Homer ate a chip is a reference to the Johnny Carson appearance, where, whilst Young was looking away, Carson ate a chip from another bowl (not of the collection) and Young, thinking Carson had ate a chip from her collection, was shocked, before Carson cleared up the misunderstanding. Jub-Jub made his debut appearance in this episode; he was named by Conan O'Brien.

Though research is usually done when real languages are used on the show, the foreign language heard on Selma's ham radio is fictional.

== Cultural references ==
The title is a reference to Sophie's Choice (1982). Marge's flashback of her and her sisters swimming in a lake is based on The Prince of Tides (1991). Later, Homer and Marge watch the movie Yentl (1983), the second reference to a movie starring and directed by Barbra Streisand. Marge mentions that one of the movies she rented for Homer features actor Norman Fell. The singers at Duff Gardens, Hooray for Everything, are a parody of Up with People. They are seen performing a kid-friendly version of Lou Reed's "Walk on the Wild Side". En route to Gladys's funeral, Homer and Bart start to sing "Ding-Dong! The Witch Is Dead" from The Wizard of Oz (1939). At the start of her video will, Great Aunt Gladys reads Robert Frost's "The Road Not Taken". Duff Gardens is a parody of Busch Gardens, originally developed as a marketing vehicle for the Anheuser-Busch brewing company. The song and ride that Bart, Lisa, and Selma go on is a parody of "It's a Small World". The Duff Gardens parade is a parody of Disneyland's Main Street Electrical Parade. Lisa's hallucination after drinking the water on the ride is based on the work of Ralph Steadman, particularly for Fear and Loathing in Las Vegas. Lisa's pronouncement "I am the Lizard Queen!" is a reference to "Celebration of the Lizard" and "Not to Touch the Earth" by The Doors. After acquiring Jub-Jub, Selma sings "(You Make Me Feel Like) A Natural Woman", a reference to the season four episode of the sitcom Murphy Brown, in which reporter Murphy Brown sings the song after giving birth to her baby.

== Reception ==
"Selma's Choice" finished 27th in the weekly ratings for the week of January 18–24, 1993 with a Nielsen rating of 14.2.

Ken Tucker highlighted the episode in a review of the fourth season: "the Simpsons aren’t winking, rib-cage-nudging rebels; if anything, they’re touchingly sincere. Groening and company want to suggest that family life is so complicated, so full of inarticulated desires and fears, that it can never be reduced to a mere collection of wisecracks. The closest the series has ever come to offering a 'message' has been in a few episodes this season that mercilessly satirize the alcohol industry in the form of the profoundly cynical 'Duff' beer company ('Can’t get enough of that wonderful Duff' is its slogan). In one episode, Bart and Lisa’s Aunt Selma brings them to Duff Gardens amusement park, where they take in the 'beeraquarium' (soused fish swimming woozily in frothy suds) and the 'Beer Hall of Presidents' (a mechanical Abe Lincoln quaffs endless cans of Duff)."

The authors of the book I Can't Believe It's a Bigger and Better Updated Unofficial Simpsons Guide, Gary Russell and Gareth Roberts, said, "A nice episode for Selma and good for Marge and Homer as well. But it's the kids who provide the highlights in this one, with their antics at Duff Gardens."

In Planet Simpson: How a Cartoon Masterpiece Documented an Era and Defined a Generation, Chris Turner said it "Fills in with the usual grab bag of great gags" and "The episode had some crowd-pleasing moments." He went on to say, "The last few minutes of the show played out to continuous laughter [in the pub he was watching it in]".

In The A. V. Club, Nathan Rabin said Selma's adoption of Jub-Jub is "the perfect resolution to both Selma's dilemma and an episode that's both sour and sweet, quietly understanding and hilariously cruel."
