= Oh Brother, Where Art Thou? =

- The Simpsons episode
- Episode no.: Season 2 Episode 15
- Directed by: W. M. "Bud" Archer
- Written by: Jeff Martin
- Production code: 7F16
- Original air date: February 21, 1991

Guest appearance
- Danny DeVito as Herb Powell

Episode features
- Chalkboard gag: "I will not sell land in Florida"
- Couch gag: The family sits on the couch and Maggie, hidden in Marge's tall hair, peeks out her head.
- Commentary: Matt Groening; Jeff Martin; Al Jean; Mike Reiss

Episode chronology
← Previous "Principal Charming"	Next → "Bart's Dog Gets an 'F'"
- The Simpsons season 2

"Oh Brother, Where Art Thou?" is the fifteenth episode of the second season of the American animated television series The Simpsons. It originally aired on Fox in the United States on February 21, 1991. In the episode, Grampa confesses that Homer has a half-brother named Herbert Powell, a car manufacturer. Homer finds Herbert, who makes Homer design his company's new car, which is an overpriced monstrosity that bankrupts Herb.

The episode was written by Jeff Martin and directed by Wes Archer. Danny DeVito provided the voice of Herb. The episode features cultural references to cars such as the Edsel, the Tucker Torpedo, the Ford Mustang, and the Lamborghini Cheetah.

Since airing, the episode has received mostly positive reviews from television critics. It acquired a Nielsen rating of 15.4, and was the highest-rated show on Fox the week it aired. Some fans were upset with the sad ending of the episode, so the producers decided to write a sequel, "Brother, Can You Spare Two Dimes?" with a positive ending.

== Plot ==
Grampa suffers a mild heart attack while arguing with a cinema clerk. Realizing he may not have much time left, he confesses a long-hidden secret: Homer has a half-brother. Before Grampa married Homer's mother, he and a carnival prostitute had a son whom they left at the Shelbyville Orphanage. Determined to find his brother, Homer visits the orphanage and learns that his half-brother Herb Powell now lives in Detroit.

Herb owns Powell Motors, a Detroit automobile manufacturer. Herb is overjoyed to learn Homer is his half-brother and invites the Simpsons to stay at his mansion. Bart, Lisa, and Maggie are enthralled by Herb's wealthy lifestyle and outgoing personality, but Marge worries wealth will spoil her children. Herb decides that Homer, an average American, is the perfect person to design his company's new car, and gives him free rein on the project. When Herb's design team ignores Homer's outlandish suggestions, Herb encourages a reluctant Homer to take command and incorporate his own ideas into the final design.

The new car is unveiled with great fanfare, but Herb is horrified by its ludicrous, indulgent design and unaffordable price of $82,000. (Note: Equivalent to $183,447.61 in 2024 USD.) Powell Motors is forced into bankruptcy. The bank forecloses on Herb's mansion and he loses everything he worked for. As Herb leaves Detroit on a bus, he angrily disowns Homer as a brother. Grampa arrives shortly afterward, eager to meet Herb, but gets back in the taxi when Homer hints at his failure. While Homer drives the family home, Bart tells him his car is great. Homer is relieved to learn at least one person likes it.

== Production ==
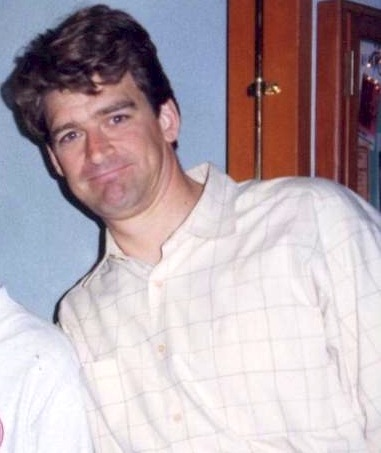
Jeff Martin wrote "Oh Brother, Where Art Thou?"

"Oh Brother, Where Art Thou?" was written by Jeff Martin and directed by Wes Archer. Both Homer's mother and Herb Powell make their first appearances on The Simpsons in the episode.

The episode was recorded on August 13, 1990. The voice of Herb was provided by guest star Danny DeVito, who was suggested for the role by Simpsons executive producer Sam Simon. Simon and DeVito had previously worked together on the sitcom Taxi, a series that Brooks created and Simon was the showrunner. Bart's voice actor, Nancy Cartwright, writes in her autobiography My Life as a 10-Year-Old Boy that DeVito had to record his lines quickly because he had another appointment, so the staff focused on recording only his scenes instead of the whole episode at once. Cartwright was a fan of DeVito's and recalls: "This morning, at the table read, I had just filled my plate with assorted fruits when Bonnie said to my backside, 'Nancy, I want to introduce you to ...' and I turned and practically knocked over Danny DeVito, all four feet, eleven inches of him. How embarrassing!" While recording the scenes, Cartwright stood directly across the room from DeVito, which she appreciated since she got to see him in action. She thought DeVito "threw his body and soul" into his performance. While the recording took part, animation director Archer scribbled down some of DeVito's attitudes, gestures, and facial expressions on a piece of paper as he performed. In one scene of the episode, Herb tells Homer and the rest of the Simpson family to "[make] yourselves at home. We have a tennis court, a swimming pool, a screening room ..." Cartwright said of it:

This was obviously written with Danny in mind as I have no doubt that he actually has the aforementioned amenities in real life. He has earned his right to stand tall, and it wouldn't have shocked me to see him spew attitude all over us if he wanted to. But he's a hard worker and he concentrated on the job [...] As the episode came to its climax, we discovered that all the material things in the world don't mean as much to Herb as being with family. Somehow I just get the feeling that this part was tailor-made with Danny, the family man, in mind.

— Nancy Cartwright in My Life as a 10-Year-Old Boy

Some fans were upset with the sad ending of the episode, and as a result the producers decided to write a sequel in which Herb would be given a kinder fate. The resulting episode, "Brother, Can You Spare Two Dimes?", aired at the end of the third season. In that episode, Herb briefly settled in the Simpson household, despite his intense continuing antipathy toward Homer. Homer loaned Herb US$2000, which Herb used to build an invention that translated infantile speech into comprehensible English, based on observations he made of Maggie. He proceeded to mass-produce his new product and regained his fortune. He then bought each member of the family gifts and paid Homer back with a vibrating chair, along with his forgiveness.

== Cultural references ==
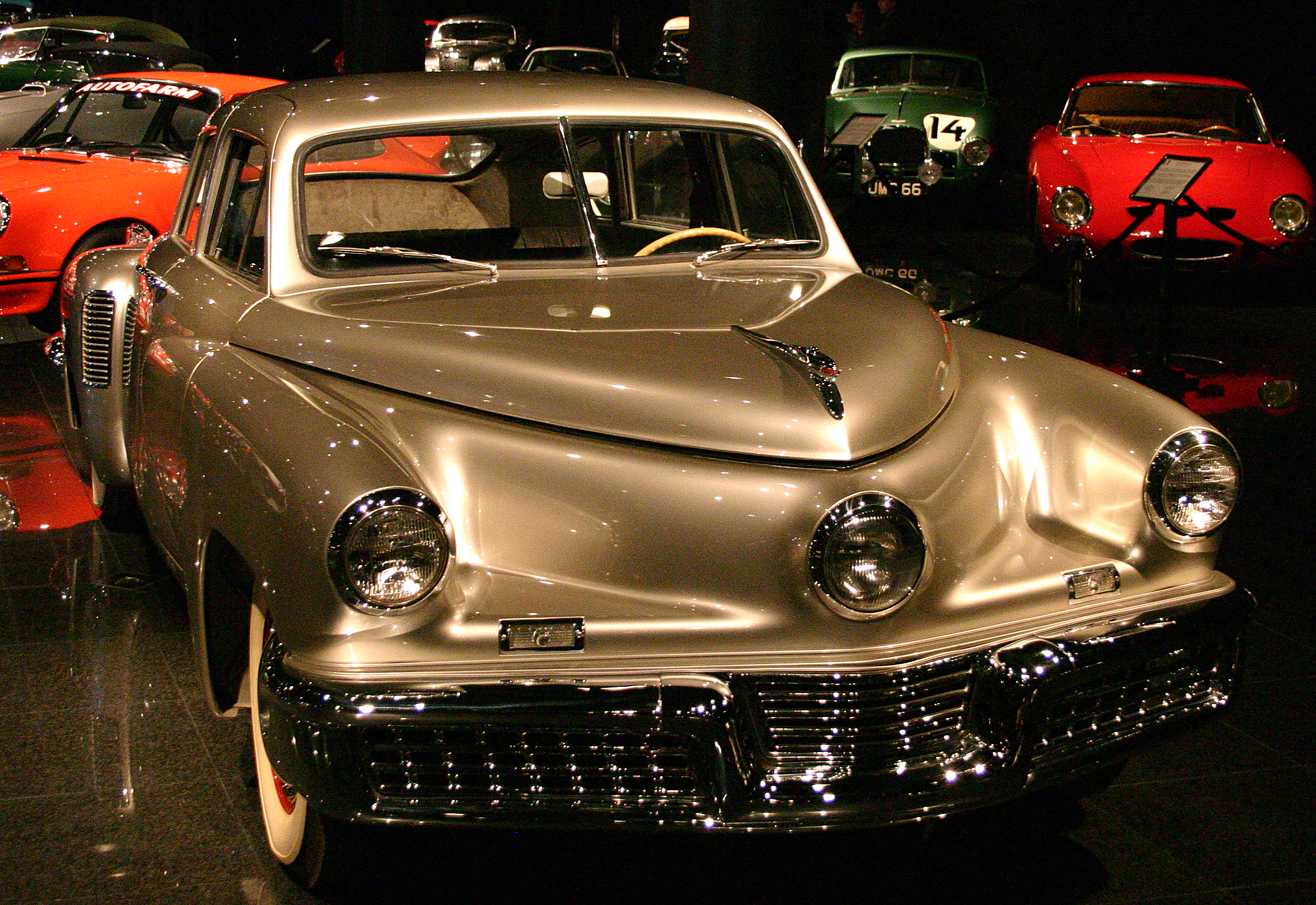
The failure of the Tucker 48 car is referenced in the episode.

The storyline of a controversially-styled car causing a company to fail echoes that of the Edsel, the Tucker 48, and the later DeLorean. The Edsel was a controversially styled car named after Henry Ford's son, Edsel, which is now considered one of the biggest car flops in history, while production of the Tucker Torpedo, which introduced many new features, was shut down amidst scandal and accusations of stock fraud in 1949. Homer wants the horns of the car he is designing to play the traditional Spanish folk corrido "La Cucaracha". The Pope is in the audience for the unveiling of Homer's new car. Herb berates his staff for suggesting that the company name a new car "Persephone" after the Greek goddess of fertility in Greek mythology, telling them "People don't want cars named after hungry old Greek broads! They want names like 'Mustang' and 'Cheetah', vicious animal names," referencing the Ford Mustang and Lamborghini Cheetah cars.

The title of the episode is a reference to the name of the fictional book "O Brother, Where Art Thou?" in the 1941 film Sullivan's Travels. Herb lives in a house that looks like American architect Frank Lloyd Wright's house in Oak Park, Illinois, works in a studio that looks like the Taliesin school of architecture in Spring Green, Wisconsin, and his factory resembles the Johnson Wax Headquarters in Racine, Wisconsin, all three buildings designed by Wright.

== Reception ==
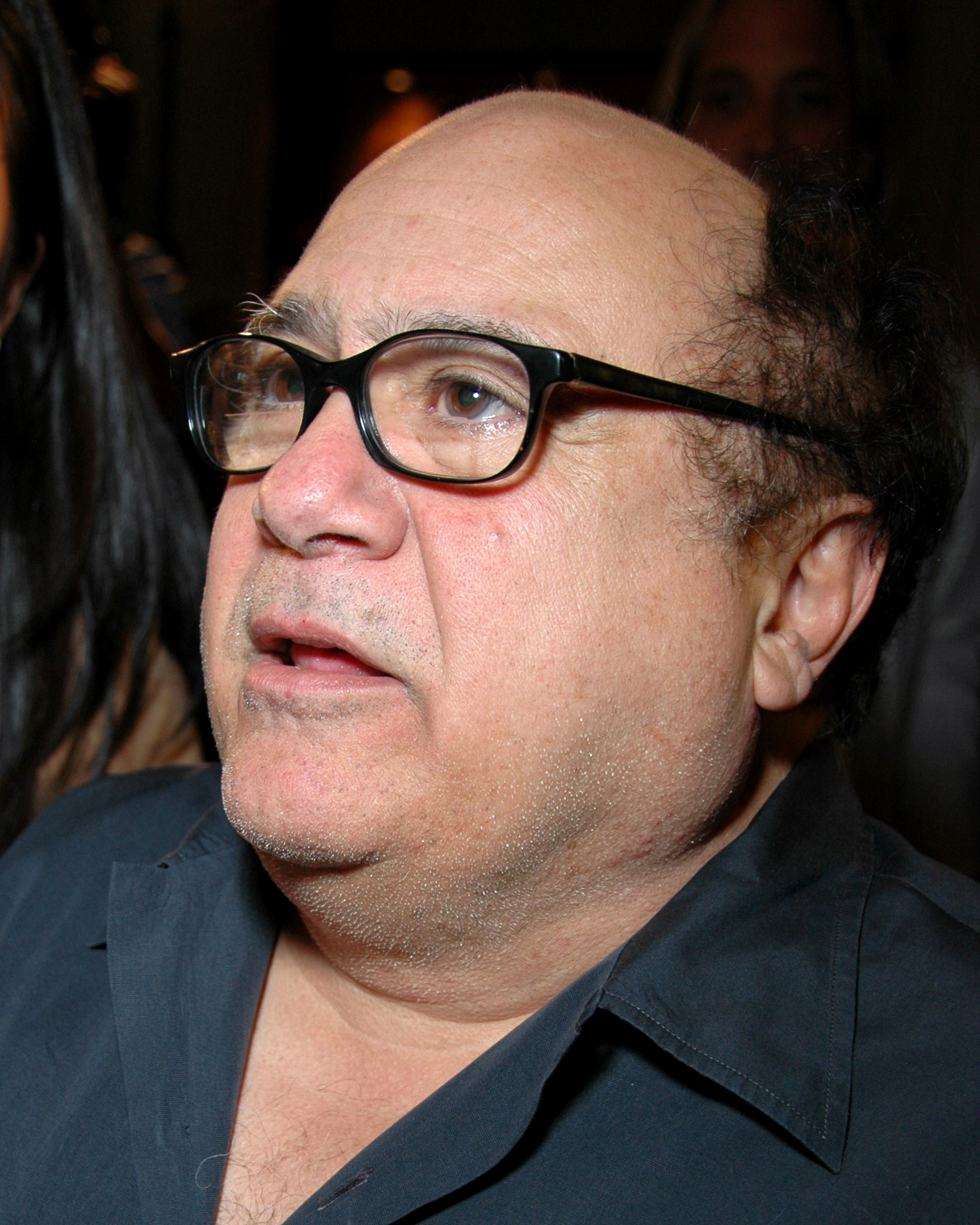
Danny DeVito was praised for his role as Herb.

In its original broadcast, "Oh Brother, Where Art Thou?" finished twenty-sixth in the ratings for the week of February 18–24, 1991. With a Nielsen rating of 15.4, equivalent to approximately 14.1 million viewing households, it was the highest-rated show on Fox that week.

Since airing, the episode has received mostly positive reviews from television critics. The authors of the book I Can't Believe It's a Bigger and Better Updated Unofficial Simpsons Guide, Gary Russell and Gareth Roberts, wrote that although it is "inevitable" that Homer's car will be a disaster, the "joy of this episode is anticipating exactly what sort of disaster".

A member of the IGN staff wrote in a season two review that "Oh Brother, Where Art Thou?" is one of the "real winners to be found in the second season". Dawn Taylor of The DVD Journal thought the most memorable line of the episode was Homer's idea of the perfect car, "You know that little ball you put on the aerial so you can find your car in a parking lot? That should be on every car! And some things are so snazzy they never go out of style — like tail fins! And bubble domes! And shag carpeting!"

DVD Movie Guide's Colin Jacobson called the episode a solid episode and said that the introduction of Homer's brother "could have been gimmicky, especially with a big-name guest star like DeVito, but the concept fared nicely". Jacobson added that he thought DeVito "brought spark to his part and made Herb fun and lively. The parts in which Homer developed his car were also hilarious and offered some of the show's best bits. The program even showed some great little moments, like the hallmark Simpson five o'clock shadow on infant Herb."

Jeremy Kleinman of DVD Talk said the episode "features another great guest voice, this time by Danny DeVito as the voice of Homer's long lost brother Herb, who reenters Homer's life and solicits his 'common man' prospective in building a car. Once again, Homer's sentimentality comes through." Total Film's Nathan Ditum ranked DeVito's performance as the 10th best guest appearance in the show's history.

On June 29, 2013, Porcubimmer Motors debuted a real-life version of "The Homer," the car that was designed by Homer in this episode, at the 24 Hours of LeMons race in Buttonwillow, California.
