= Principal Charming =

- The Simpsons episode
- Episode no.: Season 2 Episode 14
- Directed by: Mark Kirkland
- Written by: David M. Stern
- Production code: 7F15
- Original air date: February 14, 1991

Guest appearance
- Marcia Wallace as Mrs Krabappel

Episode features
- Chalkboard gag: "I will not belch the national anthem"
- Couch gag: When the Simpsons sit on the couch, it opens into a sofa bed.
- Commentary: Matt Groening; Mike Reiss; Mark Kirkland

Episode chronology
← Previous "Homer vs. Lisa and the 8th Commandment"	Next → "Oh Brother, Where Art Thou?"
- The Simpsons season 2

"Principal Charming" is the fourteenth episode of the second season of the American animated television series The Simpsons. It originally aired on Fox in the United States on February 14, 1991. In this episode, Marge asks Homer to find a husband for her sister Selma. Homer invites Principal Skinner to dinner after Bart gets caught vandalizing the school's lawn. Skinner's dinner with the Simpsons fails to go as planned when he instead falls for Selma's twin sister Patty.

The episode was written by David M. Stern and directed by Mark Kirkland. The characters Hans Moleman, Groundskeeper Willie and Squeaky Voiced Teen make their first appearances on The Simpsons in this episode. "Principal Charming" features cultural references to films such as Vertigo, Gone with the Wind, and The Hunchback of Notre Dame.

Since airing, the episode has received mostly positive reviews from television critics. It acquired a Nielsen rating of 14.1, and was the highest-rated show on Fox the week it aired.

== Plot ==
After attending the wedding of a coworker, Selma begs her sister Marge to help her find a husband. Marge asks Homer to help find a husband for Selma, but he struggles to find anyone suitable. When Bart is caught spelling his name on the school's lawn by killing the grass with a herbicide, Principal Skinner summons Homer to his office to discuss the prank. After learning that Skinner is single, Homer invites him to dinner. When Skinner arrives at the Simpsons' house, Homer accidentally introduces him to Patty instead of Selma; Skinner is instantly smitten with her, making Selma feel even worse about her marriage prospects.

Skinner asks Patty for a date, but she is reluctant. Selma encourages her to go on her first date in 25 years and warns her this may be her last chance to marry. Patty does not enjoy her first date with Skinner, but they keep seeing other and eventually bond, much to Selma's chagrin. Because Skinner is distracted by his love for Patty, he allows Bart and the other children to do whatever they want at school. He soon enlists Bart's help to persuade Patty to marry him. At the same time, Homer arranges a date between Barney and Selma, which she reluctantly attends.

Following Bart's lead, Skinner uses an herbicide to write "Marry Me Patty" on the school's lawn. Skinner takes her to the top of the school's bell tower to propose marriage. Patty is flattered, but she declines because she and Selma share a special bond as twin sisters. Patty appreciates Skinner's understanding and gentlemanly conduct, and admits that were she ever to settle down with a man, she would marry him. After rescuing Selma from her date with Barney, Patty drives her home to their apartment. Meanwhile, Skinner accepts his fate and reasserts his authority over Bart by destroying the entire lawn with herbicide and forcing him to repair the damage by replanting the field seed by seed, much to Groundskeeper Willie's satisfaction.

== Production ==
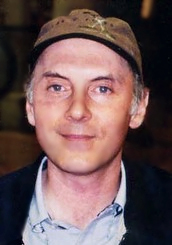
Dan Castellaneta provided the voice of several new characters.

The episode was written by David M. Stern and directed by Mark Kirkland. Stern particularly liked writing episodes about Marge and her sisters Patty and Selma. Executive producer Mike Reiss said none of the staff members could relate on a personal level to the twins, but Stern "seemed to really hook in to them, so he did some great episodes featuring members of the Bouvier family." Due to the episode's romantic theme, the airdate was pushed back to Valentine's Day on February 14, 1991. It was, however, ready to be aired several months earlier.

The characters Hans Moleman, Groundskeeper Willie and Squeaky Voiced Teen made their first appearances on the show in "Principal Charming". Willie's role in the episode was to punish Bart by making him re-sod the grass. Originally, Willie was just written as an angry janitor, and the fact that he was Scottish was added during a recording session. Dan Castellaneta was assigned to do the voice, but he did not know what voice to use. Sam Simon, who was directing at the time, told Castellaneta to use an accent. He first tried using a Spanish voice, which Simon felt was too clichéd. He then tried a "big dumb Swede", which was also rejected. For his third try, he used the voice of an angry Scotsman, which was deemed appropriate enough and was used in the episode. Originally thought by the directors to be a one-shot appearance, Willie has since become a common recurring character. The show's creator Matt Groening later revealed that the character was based partially on Angus Crock, a kilt-wearing chef from the sketch comedy show Second City Television, who was portrayed by Dave Thomas, and Jimmy Finlayson, the mustachioed Scottish actor who appeared in thirty-three Laurel and Hardy films. In addition to Willie, Castellaneta also provided the voice of Squeaky Voiced Teen, whose voice is lifted from actor Richard Crenna's character Walter Denton in the sitcom Our Miss Brooks. Moleman's voice was also provided by Castellaneta. While his driver's license in this episode showed his name as "Ralph Melish," he was later given the name Moleman by Groening, who thought the character looked like a mole.

== Cultural references ==
The scene with Skinner climbing the bell tower to get a better look of where the sodium tetrasulfate smell is coming from is a reference to the final scene of the 1958 film Vertigo. Moleman's drivers license says his name is Ralph Melish, a reference to the Monty Python sketch "The Adventures of Ralph Melish: Hot Dog and Knickers" from the 1973 album The Monty Python Matching Tie and Handkerchief. While searching for a man worthy of Selma, Homer imagines himself using a computer-enhanced overlay on his vision, similar to characters from the films Westworld, The Terminator and RoboCop. Skinner sings the song "Inchworm" by Danny Kaye as he rings the bell to Patty and Selma's apartment. Skinner carries Patty up the steps of the bell tower as Quasimodo did with Esmeralda in the 1939 film The Hunchback of Notre Dame. During the bell tower scene, Skinner exclaims, "You love me! Callooh! Callay!", a reference to Jabberwocky. Selma sings Lisa a lullaby version of the song "Brandy" by Elliot Lurie. When Patty bids farewell to Skinner, she says, "Goodnight, sweet principal", a reference to "Goodnight, sweet prince" from Hamlet. When Skinner returns to school, he declares that "Tomorrow is another school day!", a reference to the line "Tomorrow is another day!" from the 1939 film Gone with the Wind. During Stanley and Martha Peterson's wedding, their vows include two lines from The Beatles' song "Martha My Dear".

== Reception ==
In its original broadcast, "Principal Charming" finished thirty-second in the ratings for the week of February 11–17, 1991, with a Nielsen rating of 14.1, equivalent to approximately thirteen million viewing households. It was the highest-rated show on Fox that week.

Since airing, the episode has received mostly positive reviews from television critics. The authors of the book I Can't Believe It's a Bigger and Better Updated Unofficial Simpsons Guide, Gary Russell and Gareth Roberts, wrote: "Good fun, with both Patty and Selma gaining a degree of humanity. Bart makes very good use of his new-found freedom as Skinner's pseudo-in-law, much to the annoyance of Groundskeeper Willie, making his first appearance."

DVD Movie Guide's Colin Jacobson wrote: "Many shows might have trouble concentrating on secondary characters like Skinner and Patty, but this episode worked nicely. Though the romantic tone could have become sappy, the program managed to stay on the right side of that equation, and it expanded the characters well." Doug Pratt, a DVD reviewer and Rolling Stone contributor, wrote that "the [episode] is heavily character orientated but poignantly comical". A member of the IGN staff wrote in a season two review: "There are some real winners to be found in the second season, and I was actually surprised at some of the episodes in the collection because I thought they were later in the series, like [...] 'Principal Charming', where Skinner falls for Patty."

Bill Goodykoontz of The Arizona Republic said "Principal Charming" was the episode that made it "clear that The Simpsons wasn't just a smart little cartoon but something much, much more." The episode's references to Gone with the Wind and Terminator were named the sixth and fifth greatest film references in the history of the show by Nathan Ditum of Total Film. Dawn Taylor of The DVD Journal thought the best line of the episode was Moe's line to the depressed Homer: "Homer, lighten up. You're making happy hour bitterly ironic."
