= Brother, Can You Spare Two Dimes? =

- The Simpsons episode
- Episode no.: Season 3 Episode 24
- Directed by: Rich Moore
- Written by: John Swartzwelder
- Production code: 8F23
- Original air date: August 27, 1992

Guest appearances
- Danny DeVito as Herb Powell; Joe Frazier as himself

Episode features
- Chalkboard gag: "I will not fake seizures"
- Couch gag: The family cartwheels to the couch.
- Commentary: Matt Groening; James L. Brooks; Al Jean; Nancy Cartwright; Rich Moore

Episode chronology
← Previous "Bart's Friend Falls in Love"	Next → "Kamp Krusty"
- The Simpsons season 3

"Brother, Can You Spare Two Dimes?" is the twenty-fourth and final episode of the third season of the American animated television series The Simpsons (and the de facto season four premiere). It originally aired on Fox in the United States on August 27, 1992. It was originally slated to air as the season premiere for the next season, but Fox decided to air it earlier to promote the series premiere of Martin.

In the episode, Homer is awarded US$2,000 in compensation after radiation from the Springfield Nuclear Power Plant causes him to become sterile. Homer's half-brother, Herb, now poor and homeless, hatches a plan to regain his wealth. Homer loans him $2,000 to develop a new product that translates baby babbling into speech that parents can understand. Herb's invention is hugely successful, allowing him to regain his fortune.

The episode was written by John Swartzwelder and directed by Rich Moore. Danny DeVito guest starred as Herb, with Joe Frazier making a cameo as himself. "Brother, Can You Spare Two Dimes?" was the second time Herb appeared on the show; he had previously appeared in the season two episode "Oh Brother, Where Art Thou?", in which Homer designing an overpriced monstrosity as the new car of Herb's company bankrupts Herb. The producers decided to create this episode in part because many fans were unhappy about the sad ending to "Oh Brother, Where Art Thou?".

"Brother, Can You Spare Two Dimes?" received positive reviews from critics, and DeVito was praised for his guest performance.

== Plot ==
A routine physical exam at the Springfield Nuclear Power Plant reveals that Homer is sterile after being exposed to radiation. Fearing a lawsuit, Mr. Burns gives $2,000 prize in exchange for signing a legal waiver freeing the plant of all liability. Homer is suspicious; Burns hastily explains that he is awarding Homer the inaugural Montgomery Burns Award for Outstanding Achievement in the Field of Excellence, complete with an extravagant ceremony hosted by Joe Frazier.

Homer plans to buy a vibrating chair as a replacement for the living room couch, which Bart and Lisa have broken while goofing off. Homer's half-brother Herb, broke and homeless because of Homer, (Note: As depicted in the 1991 episode "Oh Brother, Where Art Thou?") learns of the prize Homer has won and stows away on a train to Springfield, planning to persuade Homer to lend him the money. Upon seeing Homer in person, Herb punches him in the face out of anger over the loss of Herb's company. After hearing a baby's cries, Herb devises a plan to regain his wealth by designing a device that can translate baby talk into coherent speech so parents can respond to their infants' needs. His invention is an instant success that makes him rich again.

Herb repays Homer's loan and buys several gifts for the Simpsons, including a new washer and dryer for Marge, an NRA membership for Bart, and a monthly book club subscription for Lisa. Herb forgives Homer for ruining him earlier and buys him the vibrating chair to reward his faith and generosity, and the Simpsons use the original $2,000 to replace the broken couch.

== Production ==
The episode was written by John Swartzwelder and directed by Rich Moore. The reason for the late broadcast on August 27, 1992 (the season usually ends in May), was because the Fox network decided to add an additional episode to the season and show it during the summer to become "the biggest network" on television. As a result, the writers, animators, and producers had to work longer hours than normal to be able to finish the extra episode, which became "Brother, Can You Spare Two Dimes?" The idea for the scenes involving the Spinemelter 2000 originated when one of the writers bought a vibrating chair to relax after working 20 hours a day on the episode.

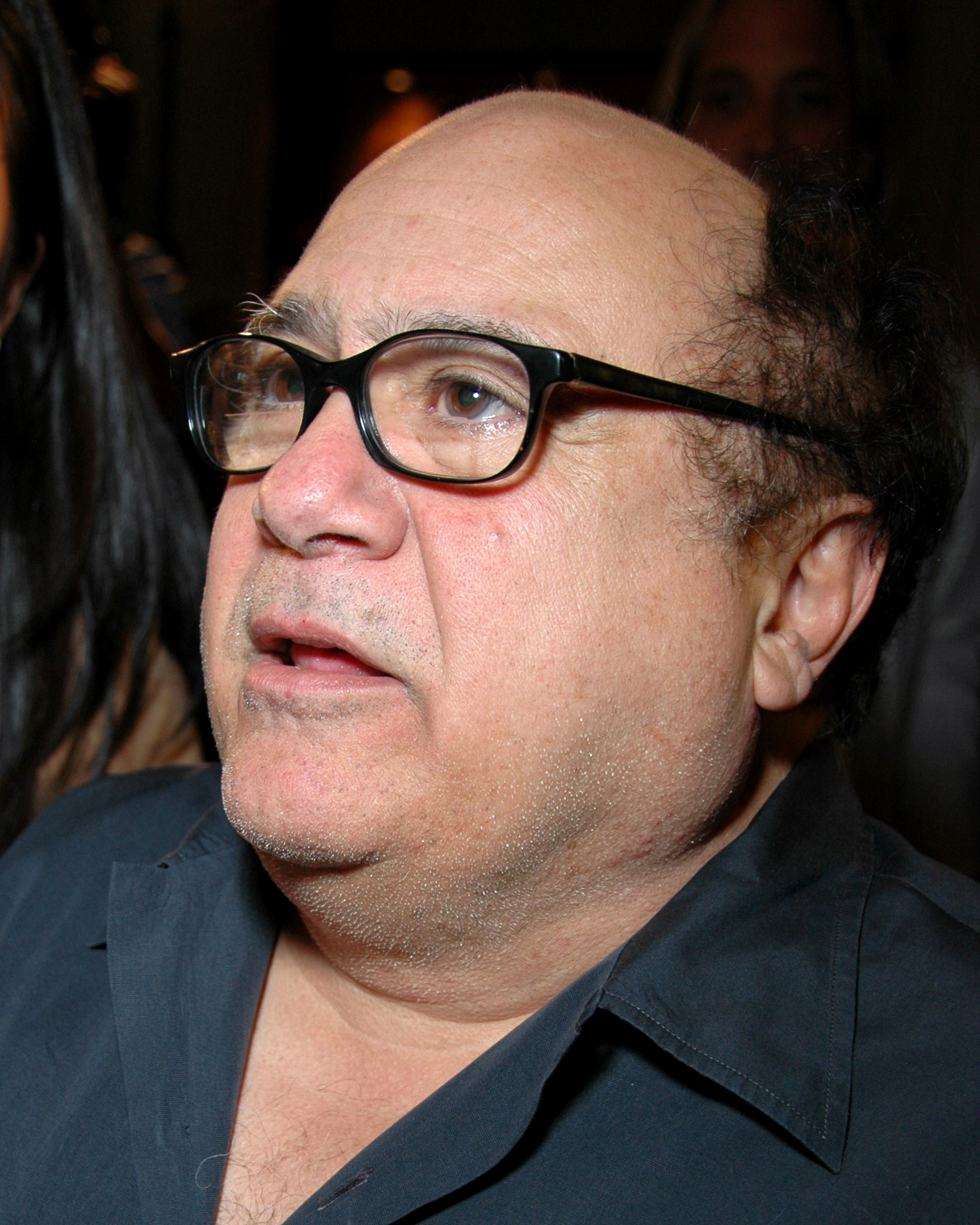
Danny DeVito guest starred in the episode as Homer's brother Herb. The producers liked his performance in "Oh Brother, Where Art Thou?" and decided to bring him back for this episode.

The decision to make another episode with Herb was reached due to many viewers being unhappy about the sad ending to the previous episode "Oh Brother, Where Art Thou?" (season two, 1991), in which Homer causes Herb to become bankrupt. It was decided that an episode would be created in which he regains his fortune. Originally the producers were going to end the first Herb episode with Herb saying "I have an idea!" at the end of it, but they decided to flesh this out into a full story, which resulted in "Brother, Can You Spare Two Dimes?". In addition, the producers decided that they enjoyed Danny DeVito's guest starring as Herb in "Oh Brother, Where Art Thou?", so they brought him back. Cast member Hank Azaria noted that DeVito was less enthusiastic in his second performance as Herb: "Some people come in and you can tell they kind of regretted doing it. The second time, Danny DeVito was like 'Yeah, yeah, yeah, let's get it over with.' He did a great job, but he didn't enjoy the process."

In part because the writers had so many ideas for what Herb would invent, the original script of "Brother, Can You Spare Two Dimes?" ended up being too long at fifty-three pages. During the same time as the voices were being recorded, the writers cut some of the material. One of the cut scenes featured Herb running after a train in order to ask which Springfield it was going to; the writers, however, decided to include a similar scene in a later episode, "Burns, Baby Burns" (season eight, 1996). There was originally a joke in the script that predicted the breakup of the Soviet Union; however, as the Soviet Union already broke up between the writing of the script and the air time, the joke was scrapped.

Boxer Joe Frazier guest starred in the episode as himself. Showrunner Al Jean has stated that Frazier was hard to record, especially him saying the word "excellence" in the title of Mr. Burns' award. George Meyer, who directed Frazier, commented that he got the pronunciation right after almost 20 takes. The original script for "Brother, Can You Spare Two Dimes?" included a scene in which town drunk Barney Gumble knocked out Frazier, who was a former world heavyweight champion. Frazier's son, however, objected to this scene: "Yes, I suggested that they change that. [Frazier] was a world champion, and a world champion does not get knocked out. My dad has only been knocked down twice, and that was by George Foreman." Originally, the producers wanted Foreman to appear instead of Frazier, but he was unavailable.

The award that Homer received was based on the Emmy Award, but with a statue of Burns instead. At some point during the season, Todd Flanders's role as the younger brother was switched; before, he had been the smaller of the two, but since this episode, he has been the elder. The scene in which Homer flips on the switch that turns on the Christmas sign was, in contrast to the rest of the episode, created via animatics. For several years, The Simpsons used a series of flashbacks to reflect on the scene in which the character is presently talking about. For instance, in this episode, when Marge talks about getting a new washing machine, the camera cuts to the washing machines vibrating wildly. However, when Family Guy began imitating the same style, the producers stopped the idea soon after. The scene where Homer bemoans Herb's treatment of him to Marge in bed was taken from another episode because they decided to explain the plot a bit more.

== Cultural references ==
The title of the episode and the plot, to a certain extent, is a reference to the common expression "Brother, Can You Spare a Dime?", a song of the Great Depression that has been recorded multiple times by artists since. Charlie Chaplin's Little Tramp can be seen among the bums. He is eating a shoe, a reference to a scene in The Gold Rush (1925). A bum mutters to Herb: "Yeah, I used to be rich. I owned Mickey Mouse Massage Parlors, then those Disney sleazeballs shut me down." Another hobo says he was responsible for New Coke. While Homer relaxes in the Spinemelter chair at the store he sees images in his head that are a reference to the penultimate scenes of 2001: A Space Odyssey (1968). In one scene, Homer reminisces about sitting on his old couch while watching Dallas, Hands Across America, the fall of the Berlin Wall and Gomer Pyle – USMC. Lisa mentions seeing an ad for "The Great Books of Western Civilization" in New Republic For Kids: "Each month a new classic will be delivered to our door: Paradise Regained, Martin Chuzzlewit, Melville's twin classics Omoo and Typee." The last scene, where Herb presents the Simpsons family with gifts for their trust in him is a reference to The Wizard of Oz (1939), in which the Wizard presents Dorothy, the Lion, the Scarecrow, and the Tin Man with gifts. Herb gets Lisa that subscription to The Great Books of Western Civilization, telling her "You'll receive a new one every month,, from Beowulf to Less than Zero", starting with Edith Wharton's Ethan Frome. She enthuses: "Finally, a copy of Ethan Frome to call my own."

== Reception ==
In its original American broadcast, "Brother, Can You Spare Two Dimes?" finished 31st in the ratings for the week of August 24–30, 1992, with a Nielsen rating of 10.7, equivalent to approximately 9.76 million viewing households. It was the second highest-rated show on the Fox network that week following the 44th Primetime Emmy Awards.

Since airing, the episode has received mostly positive reviews from television critics. The authors of the book I Can't Believe It's a Bigger and Better Updated Unofficial Simpsons Guide, Gary Russell and Gareth Roberts, were positive of the episode, particularly praising the scenes involving Homer's fixation for vibrating chairs and Maggie speaking to the family through the baby translator. The Guardian's David Eklid said episodes such as "Brother, Can You Spare Two Dimes?", "Lisa's Pony" and "Stark Raving Dad" make season three "pretty much the best season of any television show, ever." The episode's reference to 2001: A Space Odyssey was named the 27th greatest film reference in the history of the show by Total Film's Nathan Ditum.

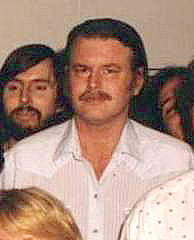
John Swartzwelder wrote the episode.

Herb's reappearance was praised by reviewers of the episode. Nate Meyers of Digitally Obsessed stated that Herb is "a perfect sibling for [...] Homer, with the two characters having a harmonious give-and-take comedic style. Indeed there isn't a great deal of substance in John Swartzwelder's script, but it is a great deal of fun with plenty of laughs to more than make up for this flaw. There is also a humorous cameo by Joe Frazier that puts a nice accent on the show."

Bill Gibron of DVD Verdict gave "Brother, Can You Spare Two Dimes?" a near-perfect score of 99/100, praising it for "the jokes about what the money could be spent on (including one of the best bits ever in a Simpsons episode—Homer sitting on a high-tech vibrating chair) and a good impetus to reintroduce Herb."

Several critics have praised DeVito's appearance. DVD Movie Guide's Colin Jacobson said he enjoyed seeing what happened to Herb, "and DeVito's performance helps make the show more successful; they really need to bring him back one of these days." Tom Adair of The Scotsman considers "Brother, Can You Spare Two Dimes?" to be a classic episode of the show, in part because of DeVito's performance. Gibron also liked the choice of DeVito as the voice of Herb as he is "almost the antithesis of everything Dan Castellaneta does with Homer vocally." Nate Ditum ranked DeVito's performance as the tenth best guest appearance in the show's history.
