= Julie Kavner =

American actress (born 1950)

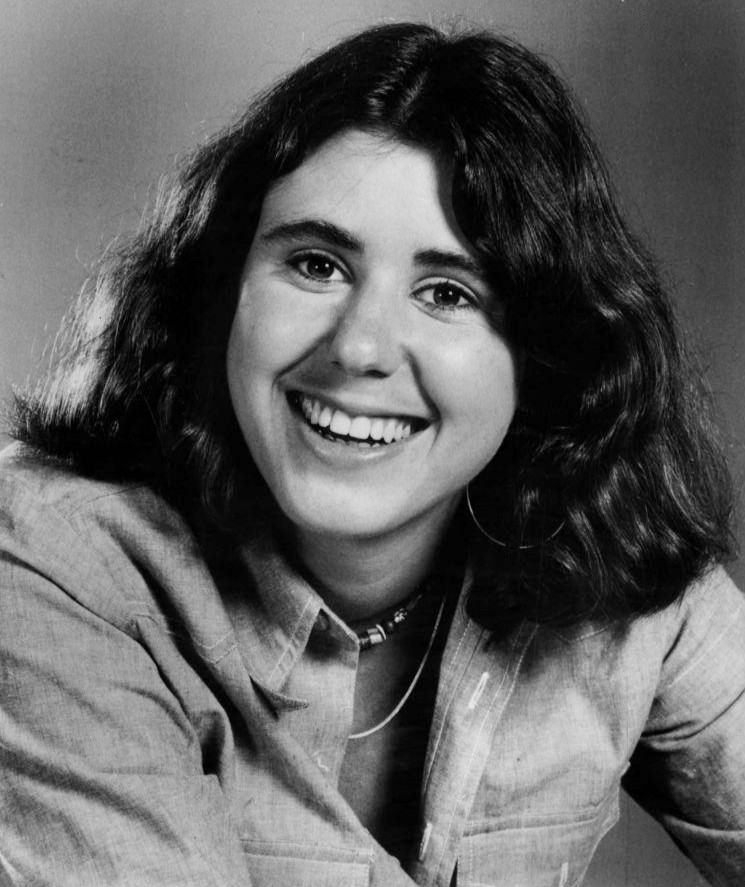
- Kavner in 1974
- Born: Julie Deborah Kavner; September 7, 1950 (age 76); Los Angeles, California, U.S.
- Education: San Diego State University (BA)
- Occupation: Actress
- Years active: 1974–present
- Known for: Marge Simpson of The Simpsons, cast member of The Tracey Ullman Show, and Brenda Morgenstern of Rhoda
- Spouse: David Davis (1976–2022; his death)

Julie Deborah Kavner (born September 7, 1950) is an American actress. Before becoming well known for her voice role as Marge Simpson on the animated television series The Simpsons, Kavner attracted notice for her role as Brenda Morgenstern, the younger sister of Valerie Harper's title character in the sitcom Rhoda, for which she won a Primetime Emmy Award for Outstanding Supporting Actress in a Comedy Series. She also voices other characters for The Simpsons, including Marge's mother, Jacqueline Bouvier, sisters Patty and Selma Bouvier, and half-step-great-aunt Eunice Bouvier.

Known for her improvisation and distinctive "honeyed gravel voice", Kavner was cast in her first professional acting role as Brenda Morgenstern in Rhoda in 1974. Starting in 1987, Kavner appeared on The Tracey Ullman Show. The Tracey Ullman Show included a series of animated shorts about a dysfunctional family. Voices were needed for the shorts, and the producers asked Kavner to voice Marge. The shorts were spun off into The Simpsons.

Kavner has been described as "nearly reclusive"; part of her contract states that she will never have to promote The Simpsons on video. For her work as Marge, Kavner received another Primetime Emmy Award for Outstanding Voice-Over Performance in 1992 and an Annie Award nomination for her performance as the character in The Simpsons Movie (2007).

Typically cast as a "woman who is supportive, sympathetic or self-effacingly funny", Kavner grew to dislike playing such roles. In 1992, she starred in This Is My Life, her first leading role in a feature film. Kavner has also appeared in live-action roles in six films written by Woody Allen, and in the Adam Sandler comedy Click.

== Early life ==
Kavner was born in Los Angeles on September 7, 1950, the second daughter of Rose (née Steinbock) Kavner (1918-2010), a family counselor, and David Kavner (1917-2016), a furniture manufacturer, and grew up in Southern California. She decided to pursue a career in acting because "There was nothing else I wanted to do, ever". She attended Beverly Hills High School (which she later admitted she hated), where she was "something of a loner", and unsuccessfully tried out for several plays. John Ingle, formerly the chairman of the Beverly Hills High School art department, later commented that Kavner was "excellent at improvisation, but she wasn't an ingenue and not that castable at that age".

After graduating from high school, Kavner attended San Diego State University and majored in drama, being cast in several productions including a role as Charlotte Corday in Marat/Sade, becoming known for her improvisation and ability to do both comedy and drama. After graduating in 1971, she got a day job as a typist at the UCLA School of the Arts and Architecture.

== Career ==
=== Early career ===
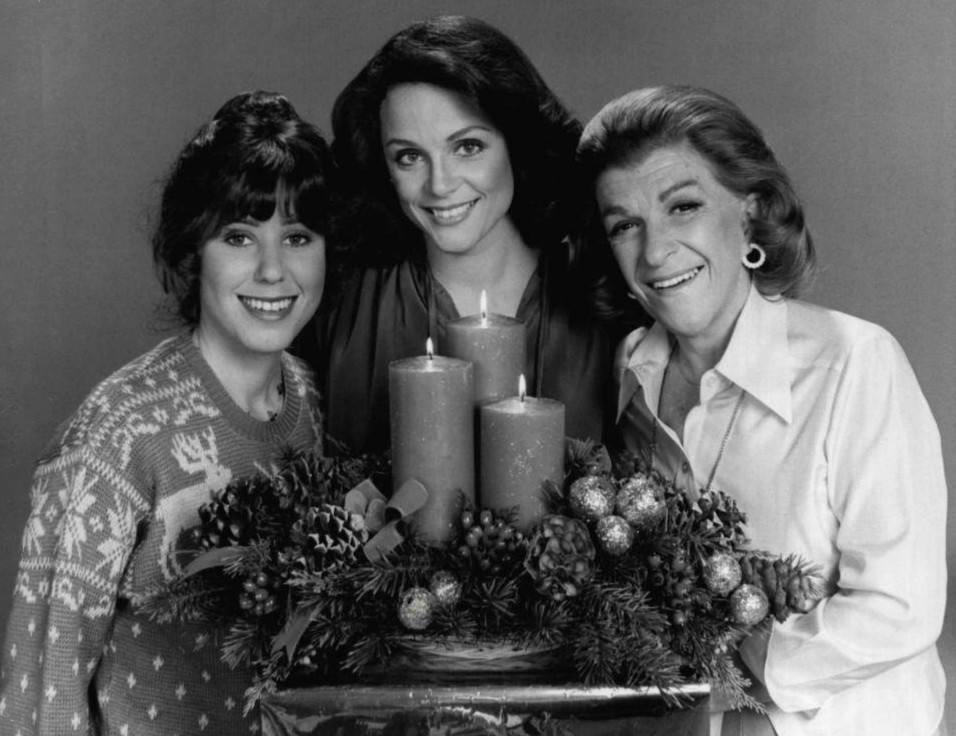
Kavner (left) in a promo for the cast of Rhoda in 1977

In 1973, Kavner auditioned for a role as one of Rhoda Morgenstern's sisters in The Mary Tyler Moore Show. David Davis, producer of the show, had convinced her to audition for the part, but decided to cast another actress instead. A year later, Rhoda Morgenstern became the leading character in a spin-off called Rhoda. Kavner was cast in her first professional acting role as Brenda Morgenstern, sister of the eponymous character. Rhoda ran on CBS from September 9, 1974, to December 1978. She received four Primetime Emmy Award nominations for Outstanding Continuing Performance by a Supporting Actress in a Comedy Series for playing Brenda, winning in 1978. She also received four Golden Globe Award nominations. In 1975, she received Daytime Emmy Award nomination for her starring role in the daytime special The Girl Who Couldn't Lose.

Following Rhoda, Kavner had a guest appearance on Taxi and appeared in the 1985 comedy Bad Medicine as well as the 1987 film Surrender, both of which were box office failures (and also starred Steve Guttenberg). She appeared in the television movies Revenge of the Stepford Wives, No Other Love and A Fine Romance, and shot a television pilot. She also starred in several stage plays, including a play called It Had to Be You at a dinner theater in Canada, Particular Friendships in New York City in 1981, and Two for the Seesaw, directed by Burt Reynolds. Woody Allen first saw Kavner one night while he was watching Rhoda in the 1970s. He thought that she was remarkable and later offered her a role in his 1986 film Hannah and Her Sisters. Kavner agreed, and credits Allen and the film with rejuvenating her career.

Kavner was then cast as a sidekick to Tracey Ullman in The Tracey Ullman Show, which debuted on Fox in 1987. Kavner described the show as, "like being back in school, a chance to play a wide variety of characters, some really vicious people, to not rest on laurels, to not play it safe". Kavner commented, "What I do is not mimicry or an impersonation, but more of an assimilation. [On The Tracey Ullman Show] we did a lot of looking at people to find out who to base our characters on. We did our homework on our lunch hour." She received four Primetime Emmy Award nominations for Best Individual Performance in a Variety or Music Program.

=== The Simpsons ===
Kavner became known for her role as Marge Simpson on the animated television show The Simpsons, a show that continues to the present day. The Tracey Ullman Show included a series of animated shorts about the dysfunctional Simpson family. Voices were needed for the shorts, so the producers decided to ask Kavner and fellow cast member Dan Castellaneta to voice Marge and Homer rather than hire more actors. Kavner has what Hilary de Vries of The New York Times described as a "honeyed gravel voice". Kavner says her voice is due to "a bump on [her] vocal cords".

Although Marge is her highest profile character on the show, Kavner's favorite characters to voice are Marge's sisters Patty and Selma Bouvier because "they're really funny and sad at the same time". Series creator Matt Groening instructed Kavner to voice the duo as characters who "suck the life out of everything". Both have similar raspy voices, but Patty's voice is more masculine and has a lower register, while Selma's voice is a little sweeter. Kavner also provides the voices of every other female member of the Bouvier family, including Marge's mother Jacqueline, Great-Aunt Gladys (a dead relative who was introduced on season four's "Selma's Choice"), and an unnamed grandmother seen on the season six episode "Fear of Flying".

While cast members and crew have referenced Kavner as a deep fan of the series and the characters she voices, part of Kavner's contract says that she will never have to promote The Simpsons on video nor has she performed Marge's voice in public because she believes the publicity "destroys the illusion. People feel these are real people." Kavner takes recording sessions seriously, and feels that voice acting is "a little more limiting than live acting. And I have nothing to do with my character's movement." Nancy Cartwright, who voices Bart Simpson, said in her book My Life as a 10-Year-Old Boy (2000) that Kavner is a warm person who is "a workhorse of an actor" with "extraordinary professionalism and quiet work ethic", and notes that she is rarely late for recording sessions. Kavner had very few recorded interviews in regard to her work on the show. In behind-the-scenes footage from 1992, she describes Marge as "a wonderful person" with "a great sex life". On a 1994 appearance on Late Show with David Letterman, Kavner explains that performing the voice of Marge in a live-action setting would break the illusion of the character, and that she does not want her own likeness to overlap with that of the character. However, after being coaxed by Letterman, Kavner turns to face away from the camera and speaks briefly in the voice of Marge.

Until 1998, Kavner was paid $30,000 per episode. During a pay dispute in 1998, Fox threatened to replace the six main voice actors with new actors, going as far as preparing to cast new voices. However, the dispute was soon resolved and she received $125,000 per episode until 2004 when the voice actors demanded that they be paid $360,000 an episode. The issue was resolved a month later, and Kavner earned $250,000 per episode. Following salary re-negotiations in 2008, the voice actors received approximately $400,000 per episode. Three years later, with Fox threatening to cancel the series unless production costs were cut, Kavner and the other cast members accepted a 30 percent pay cut, down to just over $300,000 per episode.

At the 44th Primetime Emmy Awards, Kavner received a Primetime Emmy Award for Outstanding Voice-Over Performance for voicing Marge in the season three episode "I Married Marge". In 2004, Kavner and Dan Castellaneta won a Young Artist Award for Most Popular Mom & Dad in a TV Series. For her performance in The Simpsons Movie, Kavner was nominated for Best Voice Acting in an Animated Feature at the 2007 Annie Awards, but Ian Holm from Ratatouille received the award. Kavner's emotional performance in the movie got positive reviews, and one critic said she "gave what must be the most heartfelt performance ever to find its way into a movie based on an irreverent cartoon". Some scenes in the movie, such as Marge's emotional video message to Homer, were recorded over 100 times, leaving Kavner exhausted.

=== Further career ===
Many of Kavner's roles have been described by New York Times writer Hilary de Vries as a "woman who is supportive, sympathetic, or self-effacingly funny". Kavner grew to despise playing such roles, saying "If it smacks of Brenda Morgenstern, I won't take the job." She had a supporting role as Eleanor Costello, a nurse who befriends Robin Williams' character in the Academy Award nominated film Awakenings (1990). Kavner interviewed several nurses in preparation for the role, and Penny Marshall, the director of the film, described Kavner as "a low-maintenance actor [...] You never have to worry about giving [her] back-story for her characters." In 1992, Kavner starred in This Is My Life, her first leading role in a feature film. Kavner played Dottie Ingels, an aspiring stand-up comedian who starts neglecting her family when her career begins to take off. Kavner described Dottie as "really selfish" but admitted, "I liked the role for that very reason." Kavner had been asked to play a character with a smaller role in the film, but Joe Roth, at the time the chairman of 20th Century Fox, suggested that they cast a lesser known actress in the lead role. Nora Ephron, the writer of This Is My Life, said Kavner "has so little vanity that it is almost shocking. Not only does she have no demands as an actress – 'How big is my trailer, what's in my refrigerator?' – but she will do anything for the character if it makes sense to her."

Kavner has frequently appeared in Woody Allen films, having roles in Hannah and Her Sisters (1986), Radio Days (1987), New York Stories (1989), Alice (1990), Shadows and Fog (1991), the television movie Don't Drink the Water (1994) and Deconstructing Harry (1997). Allen described her as "a naturally funny person. When she does a scene, you listen to her and look at her, and the prism through which it's all filtered is funny." Kavner believes he is "a true filmmaker, one that has something to say, continually experimenting on different themes within his own film-making", adding that "anything [Allen] ever does, I always want to do, [...] I don't even have to read it."

She has done voice-over work in films such as The Lion King 1½ (2004), Dr. Dolittle (1998) and an uncredited role as an unseen public-address-system announcer in A Walk on the Moon (1999). She worked with Tracey Ullman in the HBO sketch comedy series Tracey Takes On... She was cast as the mother of Adam Sandler's character in Click, released in 2006, which marked her last appearance outside of The Simpsons until her role in the James L. Brooks film Ella McCay (2025).

== Personal life ==
Kavner is Jewish. She lived in Manhattan during the 1990s. She leads an intensely private life, described by The New York Times as "nearly reclusive" and "discreet and guarded beyond the usual reticent star routine". She rarely makes public appearances and refuses to be photographed while working. She was in a relationship with producer David Davis from 1976 until his death in 2022. Neither of them confirmed being married, though reports referred to her as his wife at the time of his death.

In 1983, Current Biography referred to Kavner as an avid athlete and pescetarian. In a 1992 interview with The New York Times, she said she was considering retiring "except for doing three days a year for Woody [Allen]", but had a feeling that she would receive a script she wanted "to do more than life itself" upon retiring.

== Filmography ==
Film work by Julie Kavner
Year	Film	Role	Notes
1979	No Other Love	Janet	
1982	National Lampoon's Movie Madness	Mrs. Falcone	
1985	Bad Medicine	Cookie Katz	
1986	Hannah and Her Sisters	Gail	
1987	Radio Days	Mother	
1987	Surrender	Ronnie	
1989	New York Stories	Treva	
1990	Awakenings	Eleanor Costello	
1990	Alice	Decorator	
1991	Shadows and Fog	Alma	
1992	This Is My Life	Dottie Ingels	
1994	I'll Do Anything	Nan Mulhanney	
1995	Forget Paris	Lucy	
1997	Deconstructing Harry	Grace	
1998	Dr. Dolittle	Female pigeon (voice)	
1999	Judy Berlin	Marie	
1999	A Walk on the Moon	P.A. Announcer	
1999	Story of a Bad Boy	Elaine	
2001	Someone like You	Furry animal (voice)	
2004	Barn Red	Unnamed character	
2004	The Lion King 1½	Ma (voice)	Direct-to-DVD
2006	Click	Trudy Newman	
2007	The Simpsons Movie	Marge Simpson, Patty and Selma Bouvier (voices)	
2022	The Simpsons Meet the Bocellis in "Feliz Navidad"	Marge Simpson (voice)	Short film
2024	May the 12th Be with You	Marge Simpson (voice)	Short film
2025	Ella McCay	Estelle	
2027	The New Simpsons Movie	Marge Simpson (voice, pending)	Upcoming

Television work by Julie Kavner
Year	Title	Role	Notes
1974–1978	Rhoda	Brenda Morgenstern	110 episodes
1975	The ABC Afternoon Playbreak	Jane Darwin	Episode: "The Girl Who Couldn't Lose"
1975	Katherine	Margot Weiss Goldman	Television film
1975	Petrocelli	Julie	Episode: "To See No Evil"
1976	Bert D'Angelo/Superstar	Billy Gordon	Episode: "The Brown Horse Connection"
1977	Lou Grant	Alice	Episode: "Housewarming"
1979	No Other Love	Janet Michaels	Television film
1980	Revenge of the Stepford Wives	Megan Brady	Television film
1980	Taxi	Monica Banta Douglas	Episode: "Tony's Sister and Jim"
1983	A Fine Romance	Laura Prescott	Television film
1987–1990	The Tracey Ullman Show	Various characters	43 episodes
1989–present	The Simpsons	Marge Simpson, Patty and Selma Bouvier, Jacqueline Bouvier, Additional voices	Main role
1990	42nd Primetime Emmy Awards	Marge Simpson (voice)	Television special
1991	Sibs	Julia	Episode: "Honey, I Shrunk My Head"
1991	To the Moon, Alice	Sitcom Producer	Television film
1994	Birdland	Madeline Diamond	Episode: "Grand Delusion"
1994	Don't Drink the Water	Marion Hollander	Television film
1996	Jake's Women	Karen	Television film
1996–1999	Tracey Takes On...	Various characters	14 episodes
2014	Family Guy	Marge Simpson, Patty and Selma Bouvier (voices)	Episode: "The Simpsons Guy"
2015	Late Show with David Letterman	Marge Simpson (voice)	Episode: "Final Show"

Video game work by Julie Kavner
Year	Title	Role	Notes
1990	Storybook Weaver	Mayzie Bird	
1991	The Simpsons	Marge Simpson	
1994	Storybook Weaver Deluxe	Mayzie Bird	
1996	The Simpsons: Cartoon Studio	Marge Simpson	
1997	The Simpsons: Virtual Springfield	Marge Simpson, Patty Bouvier, Selma Bouvier	
1999	Simpsons Bowling	Marge Simpson, Patty Bouvier, Selma Bouvier	
2001	The Simpsons Wrestling	Marge Simpson	
2001	The Simpsons: Road Rage	Marge Simpson	
2002	The Simpsons Skateboarding	Marge Simpson	
2003	The Simpsons: Hit & Run	Marge Simpson, Patty Bouvier, Selma Bouvier	
2007	The Simpsons Game	Marge Simpson, Patty Bouvier, Selma Bouvier	
2012	The Simpsons: Tapped Out	Marge Simpson, Patty Bouvier, Selma Bouvier	
2025	Fortnite Battle Royale	Marge Simpson	

Music video work by Julie Kavner
Year	Song	Role	Artist
1990	"Do the Bartman"	Marge Simpson	The Simpsons

Theme park work by Julie Kavner
Year	Title	Role	Notes
2008	The Simpsons Ride	Marge Simpson, Patty Bouvier, Selma Bouvier	
