= Simpson family =

Family in animation series The Simpsons

The Simpsons
- The Simpsons family
- Clockwise from far left: Bart, Marge, Maggie, Homer, Lisa, Snowball II, Santa's Little Helper
- First appearance: "Good Night" (April 19, 1987; 39 years ago) "Simpsons Roasting on an Open Fire" (Snowball II and Santa's Little Helper; December 17, 1989; 36 years ago)
- Created by: Matt Groening

The Simpson family are the titular main characters featured in the animated television series The Simpsons. The Simpsons are a dysfunctional nuclear family consisting of married couple Homer and Marge and their three children, Bart, Lisa, and Maggie. They live at 742 Evergreen Terrace in the fictional town of Springfield, United States. They were created by cartoonist Matt Groening, who conceived the characters after his own family members, substituting "Bart" for his own name. The family debuted on Fox on April 19, 1987, in The Tracey Ullman Show short "Good Night" and were later spun off into their own series, which debuted on Fox in the United States on December 17, 1989, and started airing in Winter 1990.

Alongside the five main family members are Homer's father Abraham "Grampa" Simpson, Marge's sisters Patty and Selma Bouvier, and the family's two pets, Santa's Little Helper and Snowball II; all of them feature in major supporting roles. Other, less prominent relatives that appear infrequently include Marge's mother Jacqueline Bouvier, Homer's mother Mona Simpson, his half-brother Herb Powell and minor relatives.

== Concept and origins ==
=== Creation ===
Groening conceived of the idea for the Simpsons in the lobby of James L. Brooks's office. Brooks had asked Groening to pitch an idea for a series of animated shorts, which Groening initially intended to present as his Life in Hell series. However, when Groening realized that animating Life in Hell would require the rescinding of publication rights for his life's work, he chose another approach and formulated his version of a dysfunctional family. He named the characters after his own family members – his father Homer, his mother Margaret, and his younger sisters Lisa and Maggie. He substituted "Bart", an anagram of "brat", for his own name, and modeled the character after his older brother, Mark.

The five family members were given simple designs so that their facial emotions could easily be changed with almost no effort and so that they would be recognizable in silhouette. Groening submitted only basic sketches to the animators and assumed that the figures would be cleaned-up in production. However, the animators merely re-traced his drawings, which led to the crude appearance of the characters in the initial short episodes. The Simpson family made their debut on April 19, 1987, in The Tracey Ullman Show short "Good Night". In 1989, the shorts were adapted into The Simpsons, a half-hour series airing on the Fox Broadcasting Company. The Simpson family remained the main characters on this new show.

=== Casting ===
Dan Castellaneta, Julie Kavner, Nancy Cartwright, and Yeardley Smith all began voicing their characters on The Tracey Ullman Show. Nancy Cartwright was the only one of the group who had been trained to be a voice actor while Castellaneta had done some voice over work in Chicago. Castellaneta and Kavner had been part of the regular cast of The Tracey Ullman Show and voices were needed for the shorts, so the producers decided to ask them to voice Homer and Marge rather than hire more actors. The producers decided to hold casting for the roles of Bart and Lisa. Yeardley Smith had initially been asked to audition for the role of Bart, but casting director Bonita Pietila believed her voice was too high. Smith later recalled, "I always sounded too much like a girl. I read two lines as Bart and they said, 'Thanks for coming!'" Smith was given the role of Lisa instead. On March 13, 1987, Nancy Cartwright went in to audition for the role of Lisa. After arriving at the audition, she found that Lisa was simply described as the "middle child" and at the time did not have much personality. Cartwright became more interested in the role of Bart who she found more fascinating because he was described as "devious, underachieving, school-hating, irreverent, [and] clever." Matt Groening let her try out for the part instead, and upon hearing her read, gave her the job on the spot.

== The Simpson family ==
The Simpsons are a family who live at 742 Evergreen Terrace in the town of Springfield in the United States. The state in which this town is located is never specified, the mystery a reoccurring joke; however, they do have snow and sometimes wear sweaters in the fall. Homer, the father, works as a safety inspector at the Springfield Nuclear Power Plant, a position at odds with his careless, buffoonish personality. He is married to Marge Simpson, a stereotypical American housewife and mother. They have three children: Bart, a ten-year-old troublemaker; Lisa, an eight-year-old child prodigy; and Maggie, a toddler who rarely speaks, but communicates by sucking on a pacifier. The family owns a dog, Santa's Little Helper, and a cat, Snowball ll. Both pets have had starring roles in several seasons. Despite the passing of yearly milestones such as holidays or birthdays, the Simpsons do not physically age and still appear as they did at the end of the 1980s. Although the family is dysfunctional, many episodes examine their relationships and bonds with each other and they are often shown to care about one another.

=== Homer Simpson ===
Homer Jay Simpson (voiced by Dan Castellaneta) is the protagonist of the show and the father of the Simpson family. He embodies several American working class stereotypes: he is crude, overweight, incompetent, clumsy, thoughtless and a borderline alcoholic. He has occasionally displayed flashes of great intellect and fitness whenever the situation calls for it, and an integrity reflecting his own values, including a fierce devotion to and protectiveness of his family. His voice started out as an impression of Walter Matthau but eventually evolved into a more robust voice during the second and third season of the half-hour show, allowing Homer to cover a fuller range of emotions. Homer has since become one of the most influential fictional characters and has been described by the British newspaper The Sunday Times as the greatest comedic creation of modern time. He has inspired an entire line of merchandise, and his catchphrase, the annoyed grunt "D'oh!", has been included in the Oxford English Dictionary. During the production of the episode "Insane Clown Poppy" the writers toyed with the idea of giving Homer a long lost illegitimate biological daughter, but when the show's showrunner and writer Mike Scully, as well as Groening rejected the idea, the writers changed the story to Krusty the Clown having one instead.

=== Marge Simpson ===
Marjorie Bouvier "Marge" Simpson (née Bouvier, voiced by Julie Kavner) is the well-meaning and extremely patient wife of Homer and mother of Bart, Lisa and Maggie. She often acts as the voice of reason, but displays exaggerated behavior traits of stereotypical middle-class mothers and takes the blatant dysfunctionality of her family for granted, unlike the other family members, who are aware that they are eccentric. Her most notable physical feature is her blue hair, styled into an improbably high beehive. Julie Kavner received a Primetime Emmy Award in 1992 for voicing Marge in the episode "I Married Marge". For her performance in The Simpsons Movie, Kavner received a nomination for "Best Voice Acting in an Animated Feature" at the 2007 Annie Awards, but lost to Ian Holm in Ratatouille. Kavner's emotional performance in the movie got positive reviews and one critic said she "gave what must be the most heartfelt performance ever". Part of Kavner's contract says that she will never have to promote The Simpsons on video because she does not want to "destroy the illusion for children". In 2008, CityNews published an article entitled "Top 10 Greatest TV Moms of All Time", and placed Marge in eighth spot.

=== Bart Simpson ===
Bartholomew Jo-Jo "Bart" Simpson (voiced by Nancy Cartwright) is the eldest child and only son in the family, at age 10. Bart's most prominent character traits are his mischievousness, rebelliousness, disrespect for authority, and sharp wit. During the first four seasons of The Simpsons, Bart was the show's main character. The name "Bart" is an anagram of the word "brat". Groening conceived Bart as an extreme version of the typical misbehaving child character, merging all of the extreme traits of characters such as Tom Sawyer and Huckleberry Finn into one person. Groening's older brother Mark provided most of the inspiration for Bart. Bart's catchphrase "Eat My Shorts" was an ad-lib by Cartwright in one of the original table readings, harking back to an incident when she was at college. In 1998, Time magazine selected Bart as 46th of the 100 most influential people of the 20th century, and the only fictional character to make the list. He had previously appeared on the cover of the December 31, 1990 edition. Bart is rebellious and frequently escapes without punishment, which led some parents' groups and conservative spokespeople to believe he provided a poor role model for children. This prompted George H. W. Bush to rally, "We're going to keep trying to strengthen the American family. To make them more like the Waltons and less like the Simpsons." Bart, and other Simpsons characters, have appeared in numerous television commercials for Nestlé's Butterfinger candy bars from 1990 to 2001, with the slogan "Nobody better lay a finger on my Butterfinger!"

=== Lisa Simpson ===
Lisa Marie Simpson (voiced by Yeardley Smith) is the eldest daughter and middle child of the family, at 8 years old. Lisa's political convictions are generally socially liberal. She is a vegetarian, and a supporter of the Free Tibet movement, and while still supportive of the Christian church in which she was raised, Lisa became a practicing Buddhist following her decision to follow the Noble Eightfold Path. She is musically proficient on the saxophone; besides the occasional riff during the opening credit sequence Carole King's "Jazzman" and Gerry Rafferty's "Baker Street" have been prominently placed during episodes. In the Tracey Ullman Show shorts, Lisa was more of a "female Bart" and was equally mischievous. As the series progressed, Lisa began to develop into a more intelligent and emotional character. When she was a baby, Bart started out not liking her, although he became nicer to her after Marge pointed out that Lisa loves him. Her first word was "Bart", with Bart happily teaching her more names. Many episodes focusing on Lisa have an emotional nature, the first one being "Moaning Lisa". The idea for the episode was pitched by James L. Brooks, who had wanted to do an emotional episode where Lisa is sad because the show had done a lot of "jokey episodes". In 2001 Lisa received a special "board of directors Ongoing Commitment Award" at the Environmental Media Awards. "Lisa the Vegetarian", an episode from the seventh season, won both an Environmental Media Award for "Best Television Episodic Comedy" and a Genesis Award for "Best Television Comedy Series, Ongoing Commitment". In Japan, the broadcasters of the series found they were able to turn the apparent viewer dislike of the series around by focusing marketing attention on Lisa. Lisa's well-intended but ill-fated struggles to be a voice of reason and a force of good in her family and city struck a chord with the Japanese.

=== Maggie Simpson ===
Margaret Lenny "Maggie" Simpson is the youngest of the five main family members and is almost always seen as an infant. She has blonde spiked hair like Lisa. Her first word was "daddy", shown at one point after Homer tucks her in. She is almost 2 years old and still uses a pacifier despite teething, although this was mentioned in a Treehouse of Horror episode ("Starship Poopers") and is not considered canon. She was quite prominent in the Tracey Ullman Show shorts, often being featured alongside Bart and Lisa but has since become the least seen and heard of the five main Simpsons. It has been hinted that Maggie has outstanding artistic and academic abilities, much like her sister Lisa; episodes taking place in the future often show her as some kind of businesswoman.

Maggie rarely speaks, but has been voiced by several different actors including Jodie Foster, Elizabeth Taylor, James Earl Jones, Harry Shearer (who used his Kang voice) in "Starship Poopers", Yeardley Smith, and Nancy Cartwright.

=== Abe Simpson ===
Abraham Jay "Abe" Simpson II (better known simply as Grampa, voiced by Dan Castellaneta) is the patriarch of the Simpson family. He is the father of Homer, the father-in-law of Marge, the grandfather of Lisa, Bart and Maggie and the great grandfather of Bart Simpson, Jr and Skippy Simpson. He is a World War II veteran who was later sent to the Springfield Retirement Castle by Homer. He is known for his borderline senility, his long rambling (and probably apocryphal) stories and his love of Matlock. Unlike other members of the family, Groening says he refused to name him, leaving it to other writers to choose a name. By coincidence, the writers chose the name Abraham, the name of one of Groening's grandfathers.

=== Mona Simpson ===
Mona Penelope Simpson (née Olsen, voiced by Glenn Close) is Homer's long-lost mother, Marge's mother-in-law, and Abe's estranged first wife. Her first major appearance was in "Mother Simpson" where she reveals that she was forced to abandon her family after being caught up in the hippie movement and participated in various acts of activism. The writers used this episode as an opportunity to solve several little puzzles, such as where Lisa's intelligence came from. Prior to the seventh season, Mona Simpson had only made two brief flashback appearances, the first being season two's "Oh Brother, Where Art Thou?" and the second being season six's "Grampa vs. Sexual Inadequacy" and in both episodes she was voiced by Maggie Roswell. Mona dies in the episode "Mona Leaves-a", as Homer struggles to come to terms with her death. The character is named after writer Richard Appel's wife, whose name is Mona Simpson. Mona was designed in a way so that she has little bit of Homer in her face, such as the shape of her upper lip and her nose. There were several design changes because the directors were trying to make her an attractive older and younger woman, but still be Simpson-esque. Glenn Close recorded original material for another episode, season fifteen's "My Mother the Carjacker". Mona also has a speaking appearance in season ten's "D'oh-in in the Wind", this time voiced by Tress MacNeille.

=== Extended Simpson family ===
- Herb Powell (voiced by Danny DeVito) – As his paternal half-brother, Herb resembles Homer, though he is much thinner, boasts a full head of hair and is more astute. He first appeared in the season two episode "Oh Brother, Where Art Thou?" when Homer is informed by his father Abe, after the latter suffered a mild heart attack, that he had a half-brother, the product of a short-lived affair between Abe and Gaby. A year after putting the baby up for adoption, Abe married Mona, who insisted he promise never to tell Homer about Herb or how he was conceived. Herb was raised by his adoptive parents Edward and Mililani Powell, put himself through college by working odd jobs, then founded Powell Motors, a car company based in Detroit. Herb is an exception to 'the Simpson gene', which causes all male members of the Simpson family to gradually lose their intelligence as they mature, as Herb is intelligent, successful and an astute businessman. Overjoyed to learn that he had a blood family, Herb bonded with the children and hired Homer, as a representative of average Americans, to design a car. The car was a flop, bankrupting the company, and Herb angrily rejected Homer as a brother and became a street vagrant. The episode was written by Jeff Martin but the idea of having Herb voiced by Danny DeVito had been pitched by Sam Simon. Due to some upsetting with the tragic ending of the episode, the producers decided to make a sequel. Herb re-appeared the next season in "Brother, Can You Spare Two Dimes?". Now broke and homeless, he briefly settled in the Simpson household, despite his intense continuing antipathy toward Homer. Homer loaned Herb $2000, which he used to build an invention that translated infantile speech into comprehensible English, based on observations he made of Maggie. He proceeded to mass-produce his new product and regained his fortune. In gratitude, he bought gifts for each member of the family and paid Homer back with his forgiveness. Homer's "seldom seen half-brother" has had only one brief speaking part since this episode: DeVito reprised his role for the Season 24 episode "The Changing of the Guardian", in which Powell's answering machine message is heard: 'Hi, you've reached Herb Powell. I'm poor again.' He also reappeared in the episode "Bart's birthday".
- Abbey (voiced by Dan Castellaneta) – Abbey is Abe's illegitimate daughter and Homer's half-sister from a relationship he had with a British woman named Edwina during World War II.
- Chester John "Chet" Simpson (voiced by Dan Castellaneta) – Chet is Bart, Lisa, Maggie's great-uncle who owns an unsuccessful shrimp company.
- Dr. Simpson (voiced by Tress MacNeille) – Dr. Simpson is the chief of complicated surgeries at the invasive care unit; she is first seen in "Lisa the Simpson". She is the one who reassures Lisa that she won't suffer the defective Simpson Gene because of her sex and also reveals that only male members are affected by it. Dr. Simpson resembles Lisa, minus the spikes.
- Stanley Edgar Simpson (voiced by Dan Castellaneta) – Stanley is the Simpson children's second cousin who shoots birds at the airport.
- Uncle Tyrone Simpson (voiced by Hank Azaria) – Uncle Tyrone is a cynical elderly Simpson relative who lives in Dayton, Ohio. The family intends to visit him during his birthday in the episode "Catch 'em if You Can".
- Great-Aunt Hortense Simpson – Great-Aunt Hortense is the one who died before "Bart the Fink" and left Homer, Marge, Bart, and Lisa $100 each; the rest of her estate was passed to Ann Landers. In a continuity error, Great-Aunt Hortense appeared on Bart's journey to Heaven in "Bart Gets Hit by a Car".
- A group of unnamed relatives show up in the episode "Lisa the Simpson", when Homer tries to prove to Lisa that not all Simpsons are failures. In the end, only Dr. Simpson and three other female members proved successful.
- Great-Uncle Hubert – Great Uncle Hubert is Bart, Lisa, and Maggie's paternal great uncle who died in the short "The Funeral". He is only mentioned once. At the funeral, Bart views his great uncle's corpse, which makes Bart turn green and faint. Later, Bart is seen running away up a hill with Lisa and Maggie, resulting in Homer and Marge scolding them in the car.
- Hugo Simpson (voiced by Nancy Cartwright) – Hugo is Bart's conjoined twin from the "Treehouse of Horror VII" segment "The Thing and I". He and Bart were separated as babies by Dr. Hibbert and was deemed "evil". To hide the secret, Marge and Homer chained Hugo in the attic and fed him fish heads once a week. Later, Bart goes up to the attic and Hugo escapes, wanting to sew him and Bart back together. Dr. Hibbert managed to catch Hugo, but notices that the surgical scar is on the wrong side, meaning Bart is the evil twin. As a result, Hugo is released while Bart is chained in the attic. Hugo resembles Bart, but with ratty clothes, messy hair, and malformed teeth. Since he is a Treehouse of Horror character, he does not exist in the main episode continuity.
- Mabeline "Mabel" Simpson (voiced by Julie Kavner) – Mabel is an ancestor of the Simpson family who was part of the Underground Railroad. She was married to Hiram before divorcing him and fleeing to Canada to marry Virgil. She kept the Simpson surname.
  - Ex-husband: Hiram Simpson (voiced by Dan Castellaneta) – Hiram is a distant relative of the Simpson family who was bribed with a new pair of shoes into revealing Virgil's whereabouts. He is the parent of Eliza Simpson.
- Virgil (voiced by Wren T. Brown) – Virgil, later Virgil Thornton Simpson, is an enslaved African-American owned by Mr. Burns's father, Colonel Burns, and rescued by Eliza. He was betrayed by Hiram but escaped with Mabel, whom he later married, from whom the Simpson family are descended.
- Eliza Van Houten (née Simpson; voiced by Yeardley Smith) – Eliza Simpson is a distant relative of the Simpson family and daughter of Mabel and Hiram. She was part of the Underground Railroad with her mother and initially helped Virgil evade capture before giving him up to Wainwright Burns. In later life, she is revealed to have married Milford Van Houten, being the direct ancestor of the Van Houten family.
- Abraham Simpson – The son of Mabel and Virgil, half-brother of Eliza, and great-grandfather of Grampa Simpson.
- Orville Joseph Simpson and Yuma Simpson (née Simpson) – Grampa's parents who both appear briefly in "Much Apu About Nothing" when Grampa tells the story of how his family emigrated to America. In the Season 25 episode "The Winter of His Content", Homer reveals that Abe's father is alive, but Abe ignores him.
- "Old Tut" Simpson - Grampa's paternal grandfather who appears briefly in A Father's Watch, where he is shown strangling his son for being a disappointment to him in his occupation of child discipline.
- Cyrus Simpson (voiced by Hank Azaria) - Cyrus is Grampa's older brother who is seen in "Simpsons Christmas Stories". Cyrus crashed his Corsair at Tahiti in World War II's Pacific Theater of Operations during a kamikaze raid. He never left and has 15 wives.
- Rita LaFleur (voiced by Anika Noni Rose) – Rita is the second wife of Abraham Simpson and a jazz recording artist. She was a singer at Spiro's Restaurant and met Abe when he was a waiter. They married and LaFleur left the restaurant, wishing to become a successful singer. She was invited to tour in Europe, but Homer suffered a head injury and Abraham realized that Homer was defenseless and wouldn't survive in Europe, so he stayed behind with him while Rita went to Europe, and the two never saw each other again. It was revealed that she later became a heroin addict which ended up ruining her singing career. In "Gone Abie Gone", Rita reunited with Abraham and they played piano. It was unknown why they were not together.
- Amber Simpson (voiced by Pamela Hayden) – Amber was the Vegas ex-wife of both Homer and Abe Simpson from the season ten episode "Viva Ned Flanders". Homer and Ned Flanders visit Las Vegas for the weekend, get drunk and unknowingly marry two women. Amber reappears in "Brawl in the Family", where the Simpson family trick her into marrying Grampa, and in the process forsake all other spouses. Amber is horrified at the deception and runs away back to Vegas, much to Grampa's disappointment at losing another wife. In "Jazzy and the Pussycats", the Simpsons attend Homer's ex-wife and former stepmother's funeral after Amber's death from a drug overdose.
- Bill Simpson is one of Abe's brothers and one of those who are deceased. Bill is apparently a communist. He is mentioned in "Million Dollar Abie" as a member of the Communist Party along with Joseph Stalin and many others.
- Great Uncle Boris – Boris is Homer's great-uncle who left his great-nephew his country home in the episode "Homer Loves Flanders".
- Mother Shabubu/Cousin Frank/Francine – Cousin Francine is Homer's cousin and Abraham's niece who was mentioned in the episode "Lisa's First Word".

== The Bouvier family ==
=== Patty and Selma Bouvier ===
Patricia Maleficent "Patty" and Selma Bouvier-D'Amico (née Bouvier; previously Terwilliger, Hutz, McClure, Discothèque and Simpson (both voiced by Julie Kavner) are Marge's older twin sisters. They are apparently in their mid-to-late 40s, since Selma has gone through menopause and they were shown as teenagers in flashbacks while Marge was still a small child. They work at the Springfield Department of Motor Vehicles, and possess a strong dislike for their brother-in-law, Homer. Selma is the elder by two minutes, possesses a strong desire for family, and has been married and divorced six times, and also sought to have a child on numerous occasions despite her age. Her sister, Patty, is one of the show's few openly gay (or bisexual, as she once commented "there go the last remaining threads of my heterosexuality") recurring characters although for the most part she has avoided relationships. Kavner voices them as characters "who suck the life out of everything". Kavner makes Patty's voice more masculine and a lower register, while Selma's voice is a little sweeter. The origins of their names are unknown – Matt Groening has a sister named Patty, but unlike the other Simpson relatives, this has not been explicitly revealed.

=== Jacqueline Bouvier ===
Jacqueline Ingrid Gurney Bouvier (née Gurney, voiced by Julie Kavner) is the mother of Marge, Patty and Selma, the maternal grandmother of Bart, Lisa, and Maggie, the mother-in-law of Homer and the widow of Clancy Bouvier. She was first referenced in a flashback in the episode "Moaning Lisa" and made her first appearance in the episode "Bart vs. Thanksgiving". She had a spinster sister named Gladys, who is deceased; Jacqueline and her family attended her funeral in "Selma's Choice". Mr. Burns and Homer's father Abe Simpson once battled for her affections; she became engaged to Burns, but eventually decided not to marry either man, although she and Abe still ran away together at the end of the episode.

Although it seems that she disapproves of Marge's marriage to Homer, stating that he is never to address her as "Mom", she does tolerate Homer much more than her elder daughters, Patty and Selma. In "Moe Letter Blues", she admits that Patty and Selma are really to blame for ruining her birthday party, not Homer; also Jacqueline never has been shown to cause trouble in Homer and Marge's marriage, unlike her daughters. Jacqueline has celebrated her 80th birthday twice, in "Moe Letter Blues" and again in "Puffless".

Like all Bouvier women, she is voiced by Kavner, and has large, unique hair, resembling Marge's, only a light gray color due to her old age. In her younger days she smoked heavily but has quit, although she still speaks more raspily than Patty and Selma. The series creator Matt Groening named the character after the former American First Lady Jacqueline Kennedy Onassis, whose maiden name was Bouvier. Out of all the characters on the show, Jacqueline has the tallest hair.

=== Clancy Bouvier ===
Clancy Bouvier (voiced by Harry Shearer) is the deceased father of Marge, Patty and Selma and the husband of Jacqueline Bouvier. His first appearance was in the episode "The Way We Was". He was kind and complimentary to teenage Homer when he arrived to pick up Marge for the prom, but after finding out that Artie Ziff was really her date remarked that Homer "took years off my life". This provoked Marge to go back and go out with Homer.

In "Fear of Flying" it was revealed that he was one of the earliest male flight attendants; Marge initially believed he was a heroic pilot and was traumatized when she discovered he was a flight attendant instead. According to Marge in "Bart the Lover" after Clancy got out of the Navy, he had trouble with his cursing that nearly cost him a job as a baby photographer, but Jacqueline was able to curtail that by having him donate money to the swear jar.

In the episode "Puffless", it is revealed that he died of lung cancer, which provoked Patty and Selma to abstain from smoking cigarettes. While Clancy does not appear with the rest of the Bouvier family in "I Married Marge", implying he was deceased before Homer and Marge were married, he is shown to be still alive when Bart and Lisa were toddlers in the episode "Walking Big & Tall", but he died before Maggie was born. Marge was particularly upset by her father's death, as Homer had to buy her a white noise machine to try and get her to deal with it. In "Homer's Adventures Through the Windshield Glass", it is revealed that Clancy left Marge an inheritance in which she would be paid $1,000 per month. This was because he did not trust Homer to provide for her. When he died, Clancy went to Hell for a check forging scheme.

In "Treehouse of Horror III", he was eaten at King Homer and Marge's wedding by the former. He also appeared as a ghost in "Treehouse of Horror XXVI".

Like all the Bouvier family, his voice has become croaky through chain-smoking for a number of years. He also shares the same grunt as Patty and Selma, both of whom resemble younger female versions of him, while Marge more resembles her mother.

=== Ling Bouvier ===
Ling Bouvier (voiced by Nancy Cartwright) is Selma Bouvier's adopted daughter. She shares Selma's laugh. In "Goo Goo Gai Pan", Selma discovers that she has reached menopause and adopts Ling in China, after lying that she is married to Homer, to fool the Chinese authorities into thinking that Ling would be part of a traditional family as opposed to being raised by a single mother. The authorities briefly reclaim Ling, but the adoption agent Ms. Woo relates to her experiences of her childhood with her single mother and allows Selma to adopt Ling. Ling has since become a recurring character and has appeared in several episodes. She seems to get along well with her cousin Maggie. Since Patty told Selma to give up smoking once the baby came home, Selma claimed she would switch to chewing tobacco, although it is shown she has not followed through with this.

=== Selma's husbands ===
Selma has married six times, resulting in the lengthy last name Bouvier-Terwilliger-Hutz-McClure-Stu-Simpson-D'Amico.

- "Sideshow Bob" Terwilliger (voiced by Kelsey Grammer) – Sideshow Bob meets Selma via a prison pen pal program in the season three episode "Black Widower". After he is released and marries the very smitten Selma, Sideshow Bob fools everyone except for Bart, who eventually foils Sideshow Bob's plot to murder Selma on their honeymoon.
- Lionel Hutz (voiced by Phil Hartman) – Lionel Hutz is mentioned as Selma's ex-husband in between Terwilliger and McClure in the season seven episode "Much Apu About Nothing". However, this is the extent to which their relationship is depicted at any point in the series.
- Troy McClure (voiced by Phil Hartman) Troy marries Selma in the season seven episode "A Fish Called Selma", in a sham marriage devised to revitalize his career and image. When he tells her this, Selma is devastated to have been used by yet another terrible husband. For a while, she attempts to go along with the ruse, if only for the creature comforts she can access. When Troy says they need to have a child to divert public attention from rumors of his fetish involving aquarium fish, Selma knows this is a line she will not cross, and they divorce.
- Disco Stu (voiced by Hank Azaria) – Disco Stu is referenced as Selma's ex-husband in the season sixteen episode "There's Something About Marrying". Despite his last name actually being "Discothèque", the name "Stu" was attached to Selma's last name upon marrying him.
- Grampa Simpson (voiced by Dan Castellaneta) – Grampa Simpson married Selma in the season eighteen episode "Rome-Old and Juli-Eh"; he previously had dated her mother, Jacqueline.
- "Fat Tony" D'Amico (voiced by Joe Mantegna) – Fat Tony became Selma's sixth and most recent husband in the season twenty-two episode "The Real Housewives of Fat Tony". The two divorced when Selma discovered that Fat Tony was already married.

=== Extended Bouvier family ===
- Gladys Gurney (voiced by Julie Kavner) – Gladys is Marge's spinster aunt and the sister of Jacqueline. Her death was noted in the episode "Selma's Choice", in which she died of a bowel obstruction. Her final words to Patty and Selma during a video will is a plea that they not end their lives old and alone like herself, prompting Selma to become more intent on having a family.
- Dot – Dot is the cousin of Marge, Patty and Selma. She gave Selma a video camera at her wedding to Sideshow Bob. This is the only time she is mentioned.
- Lou Gurney – Lou is the uncle of Marge Simpson, Patty Bouvier and Selma Bouvier. In "Children of a Lesser Clod", Marge is called to identify Lou's body, which turns out to be a very much alive Hans Moleman. While Marge is identifying the body, Homer starts a daycare center for local children.
- Uncle Arthur Bouvier – Uncle Arthur is the uncle of Bart, Lisa and Maggie, mentioned by Marge in "The Boy Who Knew Too Much". According to Marge, Arthur suffered from auditory hallucinations and went on a homicidal spree before 75 federal marshals brought him down. Otherwise, he is never mentioned and has never made an appearance.
- Meaux and Genevieve Bouvier (voiced by Hank Azaria and Julie Kavner) – Marge's atheist grandmother Genevieve Bouvier lived in Vichy France in 1944 during World War II. She is discussed in "My Way or the Highway to Heaven". Genevieve co-managed Cafe Meaux with the café's namesake, her husband Meaux, a Nazi-collaborator, and self-described treasoner. They team up to stop Nazi officers from revealing the impending D-Day invasion is to happen in Normandy.
- Eunice Bouvier (voiced by Julie Kavner) – the 100-year-old, half-great-aunt of Marge, Patty and Selma, and half-great-great-aunt of Bart, Lisa and Maggie who resides in Gainesville, Florida. The family were supposed to visit for her birthday in "Lisa Gets the Blues", but instead visit New Orleans and Eunice spends the day alone; Lisa was supposed to play the saxophone for her, as Eunice likes music. She reappears in "I'm Dancing as Fat as I Can", where Marge, Patty and Selma are told Eunice is dying. Upon arrival at her home, Patty and Selma mark everything they want to inherit with sticky notes, as a result of which Eunice threatens them with a smashed lamp. She later recovers.

== Pets ==
=== Dogs ===
- Santa's Little Helper (voiced by Frank Welker and Dan Castellaneta) – Santa's Little Helper is the Simpsons' pet greyhound. He first appeared in "Simpsons Roasting on an Open Fire" as a race dog adopted by Homer and Bart and has been in the series since. While usually well-behaved, he can be vicious at times, having a female dog giving birth to 25 puppies which angers Bart at first, although Bart loves and cares for him deeply.

- She Biscuit: Santa's Little Helper's mother, who was separated from him when he was a puppy by their owner Les Moore. In the episode "The Way of the Dog", the Simpsons track down Moore and Santa's Little Helper and She Biscuit are reunited.
- Puppies: Santa's Little Helper is the father of numerous puppies, including 25 with She's the Fastest in "Two Dozen and One Greyhounds" and at least one other litter with Dr. Hibbert's poodle Rosa Barks in "Today I Am A Clown".
- Country Cousins' Dog – Santa's Little Helper's brother, owned by a family whom the Simpsons refer to as their "country cousins" because of the two dogs' relationship in the episode "The Bonfire of the Manatees".

- Laddie – A collie owned by the Simpson family in the episode "The Canine Mutiny". He joined the family after Bart managed to get a credit card issued to Santos L. Halper (a non-existent person whose name is a corruption of "Santa's Little Helper") and purchased him from a catalogue. Described in the catalogue as the ultimate dog, Laddie was able to perform household chores and use the toilet. Laddie resides with the Springfield Police Department after he incidentally sniffed out marijuana at a blind man's house and Bart gave up ownership.
- She's The Fastest - A female racing greyhound who Santa's Little Helper mated with in the episode "Two Dozen and One Greyhounds". Her owner, the Rich Texan, gave her to the Simpsons since her bond to Santa's Little Helper meant she could no longer race, and she soon gave birth to a litter of 25 puppies. She is not seen again, presumably having gone back into the Rich Texan's care or moved in with her puppies at Mr. Burns's house.

=== Cats ===
- Snowball – Snowball (also known as Snowball I) was the Simpson family's first cat. She was first mentioned in the series premiere in a Christmas letter Marge is writing where she explains that Snowball died that year and went to "kitty heaven". Snowball was named due to her white fur. Snowball was, according to Lisa in a poem, run over by a Chrysler belonging to Mayor Quimby's brother "Clovis". She is seen during Bart's escalator ride to Heaven in the second-season episode "Bart Gets Hit by a Car" and in flashback in the ninth-season episode "Lisa's Sax". Bart unsuccessfully tries to revive her in "Dial Z for Zombies".
- Snowball II – (voiced by Frank Welker and Dan Castellaneta) Snowball II is the Simpson family's second cat. Although the original Snowball had white fur, which inspired her name, Snowball II has black fur. She first appeared in the series premiere but has received little attention in the series. Snowball II and Santa's Little Helper have always been shown as having a good relationship; usually they are seen sleeping near each other. Snowball II's largest role is in the fourteenth season episode "Old Yeller Belly", in which she saves Homer from a burning treehouse. She also has minor roles in "Bart Gets an Elephant", where she tries to get attention; in "Two Dozen and One Greyhounds", in which she is scared by the many puppies; and in "Make Room for Lisa", in which Lisa has a hallucination where she becomes Snowball II. She is also the focus of a subplot in the sixteenth season episode "The Seven-Beer Snitch", in which she becomes overweight after abandoning the Simpsons for brief periods to visit a different family, but she then goes back to live with the Simpson family.

- In the episode "I, (Annoyed Grunt)-Bot", Snowball II is killed and is replaced in series by Snowball III and then Coltrane (a.k.a. Snowball IV), both of which also die quickly. A final replacement, Snowball V is identical to Snowball II and proves to be less unlucky. Lisa renames this cat Snowball II and the events of this episode are never referred to again.

=== Other pets ===
- Plopper – Plopper, formerly known as Harry Plopper and Spider Pig, is Homer's pet pig, introduced in The Simpsons Movie, later having recurring appearances in the series.
- Princess – Princess was Lisa's pony from the episode "Lisa's Pony". Homer bought Lisa a pony to show her that he loves her, but he has to work two jobs to keep her. When Lisa discovers this she gives up Princess.
- Stampy – Stampy was an African elephant briefly owned by the Simpson family in the episode "Bart Gets an Elephant".
- Chirpy Boy and Bart Junior – Chirpy Boy and Bart Junior were Bart's pet lizards in the episode "Bart the Mother".
- Pinchy – Pinchy was Homer's pet lobster in "Lisa Gets an "A"". Homer went to the supermarket to buy a lobster that he could cook for dinner. Homer found that the big lobsters were too expensive, so he bought a smaller lobster with the intention of fattening him up, but he grew attached to the lobster and decided to keep him as a pet instead, naming him Pinchy. At the end of the episode, Homer puts Pinchy in a hot bath, but accidentally boils and kills him. Since his body is cooked, a sobbing Homer eats Pinchy's remains, saying that "That's what he would want".
- Mojo – Mojo was the helper monkey Homer had in the episode "Girly Edition". Mojo, an intelligent and highly trained service animal when Homer adopted him, quickly adapted to match Homer's lazy and unhealthy lifestyle. When Mojo's condition severely worsens, Homer, fearing the repercussions of potentially having the monkey die under his watch, drops him off at the adoption center.
- Strangles – Strangles was a green tree python that Bart owned during the episode "Stop or My Dog Will Shoot", during which time Santa's Little Helper was a police dog. Strangles's current owner is Groundskeeper Willie. Bart named the snake Strangles while it was strangling Homer on the dinner table.
- Pokey – Pokey was a guinea pig and Lisa's first pet of her own in the episode "The War of Art", where it destroyed the iconic artwork over the lounge.
- Unnamed Goldfish - At the end of the episode "The Way of the Dog", Snowball is seen threatening an unnamed goldfish in an aquarium in the Simpsons' house.
