= Patty and Selma =

Fictional characters from The Simpsons franchise

Patty and Selma Bouvier
- The Simpsons characters
- Patty (left) and Selma (right)
- First appearance: "Simpsons Roasting on an Open Fire"; The Simpsons; December 17, 1989
- Created by: Matt Groening; Mimi Pond
- Designed by: Matt Groening
- Voiced by: Julie Kavner

In-universe information
- Full name: Patricia Agatha Cruella Bouvier Selma Bouvier-D'Amico (née Bouvier)-Terwilliger-Hutz-McClure-Discotheque-Simpson
- Gender: Female
- Occupation: Civil servants, DMV
- Family: Clancy Bouvier (father); Jacqueline Bouvier (mother); Marge Simpson (sister)
- Spouses: Selma only: Sideshow Bob; Lionel Hutz; Grampa Simpson; Troy McClure; Disco Stu; Tony D'Amico
- Children: Selma only: Ling Bouvier (adopted)
- Relatives: Bart Simpson (nephew); Lisa Simpson (niece); Maggie Simpson (niece); Eunice Bouvier (half-great-aunt); Beatrice Bouvier (aunt); Gladys Gurney (aunt); Lou Gurney (uncle)

Patricia Maleficent "Patty" Bouvier (also Patricia Agatha Cruella "Patty" Bouvier) and Selma Bouvier-Terwilliger-Hutz-McClure-Stu-D'Amico-Simpson (née Bouvier, /ˈbuːvieɪ/ BOO-vee-ay) are fictional characters in the American animated sitcom The Simpsons. They are twin sisters and are voiced by Julie Kavner, who also voices their younger sister, Marge. Patty and Selma, both gravel-voiced chain-smokers, work at the Springfield Department of Motor Vehicles. They have a strong dislike for their brother-in-law, Homer Simpson, who likewise loathes them. Selma, the elder by two minutes, longs for male companionship and has had multiple brief, doomed marriages, and has herself offered help in some fashion to Marge and Homer as she envies their loving relationship; she receives occasional compassionate support from Homer who even poses as her husband to help her adopt a child. Patty is an initially closeted lesbian who embraces celibacy until she begins dating women. Kavner voices them as characters who "suck the life out of everything". Patty and Selma debuted on the first Simpsons episode "Simpsons Roasting on an Open Fire", which aired on December 17, 1989.

== Distinguishing features ==
Being twins, the two have a similar look, but there are several easy ways to distinguish them, including:

- Hairstyle: Patty has an afro perm, while Selma's hair is parted in the middle.
- Attire: Patty wears a short-sleeved pink dress and pink shoes while Selma wears a hemmed sleeveless blue dress and blue shoes.
- Jewelry: Patty wears blue or orange triangular earrings and spherical beads connected by a visible string, while Selma wears orange or purple circular earrings (occasionally earrings shaped in an "S" in early episodes) and elliptical beads attached to each other.

They both resemble their chain-smoking father Clancy Bouvier who appeared in a flashback of the episode "The Way We Was". In the episode "The Blue and the Gray", it is revealed that Selma is actually a blonde, while Patty is a redhead. Their hair has turned blue-gray from long-term exposure to cigarette smoke and ash.

== Biography ==
Rarely seen apart, Patty and Selma are known for their distinctive gravelly voices, cynical outlook on life, bitter and unpleasant personalities, and love of cigarettes. They share an apartment at the Spinster City apartment complex and both work at the DMV. The two are avid, sometimes maniacal fans of the TV series, MacGyver. The two seem to be aroused by the character and smoke a cigarette after every viewing of the show. When Jay Sherman, on advice from Homer, told Patty and Selma that MacGyver is gay, they stripped him to his boxers and hung him from the gutters. On the eve of Selma's marriage to Sideshow Bob, he insulted MacGyver and the wedding was almost cancelled as a result. Selma and Patty once met the actor who portrayed MacGyver, Richard Dean Anderson, and kidnapped him. Patty and Selma have taken many vacations together to various places including Czechoslovakia and the Dead Sea, where Selma sunk to the bottom when she attempted to float on her back. Patty and Selma have also brought home "souvenirs" from their vacations, including a pillowcase full of seashells from their trip to Sulfur Bay that they forced the family to help them clean and organize. They drove away Richard Dean Anderson by showing him slides of their trip to the Remington Carriage Museum in Cardston, Alberta.

Patty and Selma have a strong, mutually reciprocated dislike for their brother-in-law Homer. They regret that Marge chose Homer over her former boyfriend Artie Ziff, and have unsuccessfully tried to help Artie win her back. However, Marge made it clear to her sisters that she loves Homer and there is nothing they can do to change her mind. Homer usually tries to be polite to them out of respect for Marge, but Patty and Selma do not hide their contempt for him. They showed little concern when Homer suffered a heart attack. While he was undergoing bypass surgery, they tried to set Marge up with a sleazy man named Andre. They own a tombstone inscribed with the epitaph "Homer J. Simpson. We are richer for having lost him" and use it as a coffee table, stick pins in a voodoo doll which looks like Homer and even commissioned a billboard urging voters to evict Homer from Springfield. When Homer contemplated suicide, they encouraged him to go through with it and then pushed him off the bridge, though this was actually part of a plot by the townspeople to bring Homer to his surprise party on a cruise ship. Patty has also given stoner Otto Mann a driver's license due to their mutual dislike for Homer, and both she and Selma deliberately failed Homer on his limousine driver's test, but their victory smoking nearly cost them their jobs until Homer intervened. They once kidnapped Homer before his and Marge's third wedding and imprisoned him in a cellar in the hope that Marge would find someone else. Moved to tears by his obvious devotion to Marge, they let him go and paid for their wedding ceremony to avoid being exposed by Bart and Lisa. For his part, Homer regards them as the "Gruesome Twosome" or "Fatty and Smellma" and was delighted when he (mistakenly) heard they had died.

As children, Patty and Selma were apparently domineering towards Marge and ridiculed her ambition of becoming an astronaut. In return for their allowance, Marge used to do chores for them. The free time they now had led to them taking up smoking. As adults, the Bouvier twins have a friendly relationship with their sister and seem very protective of her thus frequently visit the Simpsons. They seem relatively fond of their nieces and nephew, but seem to like them more when they are young, as Selma remarks "The older they get, the cuter they ain't." On occasions, they babysit Bart, Lisa and Maggie, something not relished by the kids. Bart and Lisa were left traumatized when they had to stay with their aunts for a week while a stressed out Marge left for Rancho Relaxo. Maggie managed to take evasive action and got to stay with Homer instead.

=== Patty Bouvier ===
Patricia Maleficent Bouvier (aka Patricia Agatha Cruella Bouvier) is the younger of the two. Despite the similarities between her and Selma, Patty is more jaded than her sister, particularly towards relationships. It was once said by Marge that Patty chose a life of celibacy, and that Selma had it thrust upon her. Her decision to not have relationships has been implied to be due to her then closeted sexuality. Earlier hints of her closeted sexuality were also shown in some of the show's earlier episodes, when she was reluctant to date Principal Skinner in Principal Charming; in Treehouse of Horror III, on seeing Homer naked, she claimed the experience destroyed "the last lingering thread of my heterosexuality." Generally, Patty is more hostile to Homer than Selma. However, when Patty came out as a lesbian, she found a surprising supporter in Homer (in contrast to Marge who was at first surprised and angry about it), and she swallowed her pride and asked him to perform her marriage ceremony. They also teamed up to try to scupper the burgeoning relationship between Selma and Homer's father Abe. Patty also joined Homer's group to ghost-write an original fantasy fiction novel, and also to stop their novel from being replaced with a drastically revamped version by the book publishing company. In one episode, where Patty stayed at the Simpson house during a fight with Selma despite Homer's reluctance, Patty privately admitted to Homer that she only mocks him because she is jealous of him having a successful marriage and family with Marge, while all she has is Selma, leaving Homer feeling grateful for her having opened, albeit briefly, a window of kindness.

==== Relationships ====
Patty's only known relationship with a man involved Principal Skinner. On a blind date arranged by Homer, Skinner was supposed to fall for Selma, but he noticed Patty first and fell in love with her instead. They dated for a while, though Patty often showed signs of reluctance through things like unjoyful facial expressions and turned down his marriage proposal, claiming him she was too devoted to Selma to abandon her. However, she did consider Skinner a gentleman and ended their relationship with the words "Good night, sweet principal." Like Selma, Patty also has a long-running fixation on MacGyver, although this aspect of her personality has been played down in later episodes.

Patty was revealed to be lesbian in the season 16 episode "There's Something About Marrying", which follows Homer Simpson as he is ordained to perform same-sex marriages. Producer Al Jean had announced that a character would come out prior to the episode's airing, prompting widespread speculation. Patty was the character that fans most suspected would come out. The episode aired in 2005, when same-sex marriage was a major political issue in the United States. The move was controversial, provoking outrage from opponents to same-sex marriage. Entertainment columnist Ray Richmond credited Patty's coming out as a significant milestone for the gay rights movement, as it proved that the movement was prominent enough to feature in an episode of a mainstream sitcom.

After coming out as a lesbian, Patty exclaims "you could see it from space!". There had been many previous hints of her sexuality: she was seen visiting a burlesque house; she exclaimed (upon seeing Homer naked) "There goes the last lingering thread of my heterosexuality"; she was seen hiding in a closet with Smithers on a parade float during a gay pride parade. In another nod to Patty's sexuality being obvious, Homer sarcastically quipped, "Here's another bomb for ya, Marge: I like beer!" when Marge was shocked at the revelation.

Patty wooed a tenured professor from Yale University away from her husband and has also been attracted to Edna Krabappel. When Selma claimed she couldn't face prison, Patty replied that she could, implying she would welcome a female-only environment. Patty's first serious relationship with a woman was with Veronica, a pro golfer. It was later discovered by Marge and revealed during Patty's wedding that Veronica was actually a man in disguise. Patty's next serious relationship with a woman was with Evelyn, who quickly bonded with Homer over similar traits during a trip to Costa Rica. When Marge pointed out that Evelyn was ruining the trip and was a female version of Homer, a horrified Patty broke up with her. However, when a remorseful Marge apologized to Patty and reassured her that the difference between Homer and Evelyn was that Evelyn truly loved her, Patty decided to reconcile with Evelyn.

=== Selma Bouvier ===
Selma Bouvier is two minutes older than Patty. Due to a childhood bottle rocket accident, she has no sense of taste or smell. According to Marge, Selma "likes Police Academy movies and Hummel figurines, and walking through the park on clear autumn days." In contrast to her twin, Selma yearns for male companionship and children. She is also slightly more sympathetic towards Homer than Patty. Selma helped reunite Homer and Marge after seeing how upset Marge was without him, despite an agreement with Patty not to say anything. Homer was sympathetic to her when she broke down after a disastrous trip to Duff Gardens with Bart and Lisa, remarking "I just couldn't cut it today", referring to raising kids. Homer also agreed to pose as Selma's husband to help her adopt a baby from China. During Homer and Marge's trial separation, when Marge went out on a date with someone else, Selma called Homer and offered to help him save their marriage, but was left frustrated when Homer mistook her for Patty over the phone.

Unable to find companionship in a man, Selma has also sought to have children. At one point she considered using a sperm donor which Homer mistakenly thought meant Selma would have sex with a robot. After babysitting Bart and Lisa for a day, she realized she was not ready to have children and wound up adopting Jub-Jub, her late Aunt Gladys's pet iguana. Much later, she adopted a Chinese baby girl, Ling. During the adoption process, Selma pretended to be married to Homer, since the Chinese government only allows children to be adopted by married couples. After the fraud was exposed, Selma managed to keep the baby as a Chinese dignitary (voiced by Lucy Liu), who had also been raised by a single parent, became sympathetic.

==== Relationships ====
Despite being identical twins, Patty and Selma have very different track records when it comes to finding dates. According to Marge, Patty chose a life of celibacy, while Selma had celibacy thrust upon her. Her standards are extremely low, as evidenced by her comments on Mr. Burns: "Single? Well, he passes the Selma Test."

Selma has actively sought out a husband, and has been married to six different men. Her current name has evolved into Selma Bouvier-Terwilliger-Hutz-McClure-Stu-Simpson-D'Amico. Her first marriage, to Robert "Sideshow Bob" Terwilliger, ended when his plan to kill her was foiled by Bart. After an off-screen marriage to Lionel Hutz, she began dating Troy McClure. They married, but she soon discovered it was just a sham to boost his flagging career. She told him she was unwilling to bring a baby into a loveless marriage and broke it off. Another unseen marriage was to Disco Stu, which was annulled by the Pope. For a time she dated Abe Simpson, to the horror of Homer and Patty. Despite their objections, the two got married, but came to realize it would not work due to his age and her job, so they called it quits. Her most recent husband is Fat Tony D'Amico, though he was already married and regarded Selma as his "gumare". It has been implied that Selma had a second failed marriage to Sideshow Bob, giving her a total of seven marriages.

One person Selma refused to marry was Apu Nahasapeemapetilon, because she said her collection of last names was long enough. However, there is evidence that she slept with Apu after Homer and Marge's second wedding. Selma has also dated various other men around Springfield, among them Hans Moleman, Moe Szyslak, and pitifully, Barney Gumble. She was rejected by Groundskeeper Willie, who upon seeing her dating video remarked "Back to the Loch with you Nessie".

== Character ==
=== Creation ===
Series creator Matt Groening said he suggested that Kavner voice Patty and Selma as characters who "suck the life out of everything...." Al Jean said Kavner makes Patty's voice more masculine and a lower register, while Selma's voice is a little sweeter.

=== Development ===
In the 2005 episode "There's Something About Marrying" of the sixteenth season, Patty was revealed to be a lesbian and became the first openly gay recurring character in the series. Groening has stated that the staff wanted to out Patty as gay because portraying her as a "love-starved spinster [...] seemed old" on the show. There had previously been hints about Patty's orientation. For example, in the season thirteen episode "Jaws Wired Shut" she is part of the Springfield Gay Pride Parade's "stayin' in the closet" float, though only her voice was heard and she was not seen.

According to the publications Zeek: A Jewish Journal of Thought and Culture and Value War: Public Opinion and the Politics of Gay Rights, it was the controversial lesbian outing of the main character (played by Ellen DeGeneres) in the sitcom Ellen in 1997 that paved the way for Patty's coming-out in "There's Something About Marrying", as well as for many other gay characters on other television shows. In his book Queers in American Popular Culture, Jim Elledge noted that it is possible the Simpsons staff chose Patty to come out as gay instead of a male character because lesbians were "traditionally considered more acceptable" on television. She did, however, not "adhere to the eroticized male lesbian fantasy or fit into the loveable, asexual guise of the comedy lesbian" that had previously been seen on shows such as Ellen. Instead, Patty is "rude, crude, and not ashamed of declaring her sexual preferences", and this could make her unpalatable to some viewers according to Elledge.

It was reported a long time in advance of the episode's airing in 2005 that a major character would come out as gay during the episode. There was a widespread debate among fans of the series as to who the character would be. Patty was suspected by many fans and the press because she had not often been seen dating men on the show. The tabloid newspaper The Sun revealed already in September 2004 that character who would come out was Patty, though this was regarded as a rumor and The Simpsons executive producer Al Jean would not confirm it. Bookmakers in the United States and the United Kingdom took bets on which character would be uncovered as homosexual—BetUS laid odds at four to five that it was Patty, while Smithers had four to one odds and Ned Flanders fifteen to one odds. BetUS said gamblers made more than 900 bets on the coming-out on their website. According to The Baltimore Sun, another bookmaker Paddy Power "stopped taking wagers because so much money was being placed on [Patty]."

*The first reference to Patty being gay, however, happened long before this 2005 episode, going all the way back to 1993, in season 4, episode 5: Treehouse of Horror III. in this Episode, Homer runs through the kitchen naked where Marge, Patty and Selma are all eating. Patty and Selma each put down their forks, and Patty remarks "There goes the last lingering thread of my heterosexuality". Since this is a Halloween episode, however, fans might not have presumed this to be canon.
