= James S. Levine =

American composer and member of Remote Control Productions

James Scott Levine (born 1974) is an American composer and member of Remote Control Productions. He has won seven BMI awards and seven ASCAP awards. His credits include the films Running with Scissors, Delta Farce, and The Weather Man, and the television shows Nip/Tuck, Glee, The Closer, Rizzoli & Isles, and American Horror Story. He has also provided additional music for films such as Madagascar, Pearl Harbor, and Something's Gotta Give.

== Early life ==
James Levine grew up in Medford, Massachusetts, where he played multiple instruments in various genres. The main instrument he played growing up was the piano, performing at multiple events growing up. At the age of 13 Levine shifted his focus from playing the piano, to learning Jazz, as well as improvisation. Composers that Levine looked up to when he was younger were Mozart, Morricone and James Newton Howard. He is of Jewish heritage.

Levine attended Tufts University, where he was originally a pre-med student. However he switched subject areas, and subsequently in college Levine studied Sociology and Musicology, and got his degree in American Studies. He graduated from Tufts in 1996.

== Career ==
Levine came to Hollywood in 1997 to begin his career as a composer, leaving behind money and family. He first started off his career by doing intern work around Los Angeles.

James Levine is a composer for shows like American Horror Story, Glee, Nip/Tuck, Royal Pains and The Closer.

The music for American Horror Story is one of his most known works, receiving many awards such as the Best Music in a Series, Best music in a non-series, and has been nominated for outstanding sound mixing for television movies and miniseries two years in a row. Due to the success of his music he has continued to create music for the show. His work on Glee has also won him many awards and he has gone on to keep composing for the show until the final season.

== Composing ==
Year	Title	Notes
1990	The Funtastic World of Hanna-Barbera	Short
1999	Chill Factor	Film (Additional music for Hans Zimmer and John Powell)
1999	A Little Inside	Film
2000	Die Motorrad-Cops – Hart am Limit	TV series
2001	Siren	Film
2001	About Barbers	Short
2003	Blue Collar Comedy Tour: The Movie	Documentary
2003	Jimmy Neutron's Nicktoon Blast	Short
2003	The Challenge	TV movie
2003	The In-Laws	Film
2003–2010	Nip/Tuck	TV series
2003	SpongeBob SquarePants: Battle for Bikini Bottom	Video game (Composed with Robert Crew and Alex Wilkinson)
2004	The SpongeBob SquarePants Movie	Video game (Composed with Robert Crew, John O'Kennedy, Barry Fasman and Beth Ertz)
2004	Blue Collar Comedy Tour Rides Again	TV documentary
2005	More Sex and the Single Mom	TV movie
2005	Roar: Lions of the Kalahari	Documentary short
2005	Madagascar	Film (Additional music for Hans Zimmer)
2005	The Weather Man	Film (Co-composer with Hans Zimmer)
2005–2012	The Closer	TV series
2006	3 lbs	TV series
2006	Running with Scissors	Film
2006	American Storage	Short
2006	Ajax	Short
2007	Hidden Palms	TV series
2007	Delta Farce	Film
2007–2012	Damages	TV series
2008	Otis	Film
2008–2009	Raising the Bar	TV series
2009–2015	Glee	TV series
2009–2012	Royal Pains	TV series
2009–2010	NCIS: Los Angeles	TV series
2009	SpongeBob's Truth or Square	Video game (Archived music from SpongeBob SquarePants: Battle for Bikini Bottom and The SpongeBob SquarePants Movie)
2010	Outlaw	TV series
2010–2016	Rizzoli & Isles	TV series
2011	Glee: The 3D Concert Movie	Documentary
2011–2014	American Horror Story	TV series (40 episodes, composed with Mac Quayle)
2012–2018	Major Crimes	TV series
2012–2013	The New Normal	TV series
2013	Do No Harm	TV series
2013	The Blacklist	TV series (3 episodes, replaced by Dave Porter)
2014–2018	The Last Ship	TV series (Composed with James Dooley)
2019	Chambers	TV series
2019	Soundtrack	TV series (Composed with Andrew McMahon and Zac Clark)
2020	Katy Keene	TV series
2020–2021	For Life	TV series (Composed with Dustin O'Halloran)
2020	SpongeBob SquarePants: Battle for Bikini Bottom – Rehydrated	Video game (Archived and remastered music from the original Battle for Bikini Bottom)
2021–2024	La Brea	TV series
2025	Doc	TV series

== Awards ==
Year	Association	Category	Nominated work	Result
2001	BMI Award		What About Joan?	Won
2005	BMI Award		Nip/Tuck	Won
2008	BMI Award		The Closer	Won
2011	ASCAP Award	Top TV Series	Glee	Won
2012	Online Film & Television Association Award	Best Music in a Series	American Horror Story	Won
2012	ASCAP Award	Top TV Series	Glee	Won
2013	ASCAP Award	Top TV Series	Glee	Won
2013	ASCAP Award	Top Television Series	Major Crimes	Won
2013	ASCAP Award	Top Television Series	The New Normal	Won
2013	ASCAP Award	Top Television Series	Royal Pains	Won
2013	ASCAP Award	Most Performed Themes and Underscore		Won
2013	Emmy Award	Primetime Emmy Award for Outstanding Music Composition for a Miniseries, Movie, or a Special	American Horror Story: Coven	Nominated
2013	Cinema Audio Society Awards	Outstanding Achievement in Sound Mixing for Television Movies and Mini-Series	American Horror Story: Asylum	Nominated
2013	Online Film & Television Association Award	Best Music in a Non-Series	American Horror Story	Won
2014	Cinema Audio Society Awards	Outstanding Achievement in Sound Mixing for Television Movies and Mini-Series	American Horror Story	Nominated
2014	Online Film & Television Association Award	Best Music in a Non-Series	American Horror Story	Nominated
