= Bridegroom (film) =

Bridegroom: A Love Story, Unequaled
- Cover
- Directed by: Linda Bloodworth-Thomason
- Produced by: Linda Bloodworth-Thomason; Shane Bitney Crone; Ron White
- Starring: Shane Bitney Crone; Thomas Lee Bridegroom
- Cinematography: Linda Bloodworth-Thomason
- Edited by: Nicolas Romolini; Patricia Barnett; Brad Durante
- Music by: Colleen McMahon
- Production company: Organica Music Group
- Distributed by: Virgil Films & Entertainment
- Release date: April 23, 2013
- Running time: 80 minutes
- Country: United States
- Language: English
- Budget: $385,000

Bridegroom (full title: Bridegroom: A Love Story, Unequaled) is a 2013 American documentary film about the relationship between two young gay men, produced and directed by Linda Bloodworth-Thomason. Bridegroom premiered at the 2013 Tribeca Film Festival on April 23, 2013, and attracted further press coverage because its premiere screening at the festival was introduced by former President Bill Clinton.

The film won the festival's Audience Award for Best Documentary Film. The film jointly received the 2014 GLAAD Media Award for Outstanding Documentary alongside Call Me Kuchu.

== Synopsis ==
Bridegroom chronicles the story of Shane Bitney Crone and his partner Thomas Lee "Tom" Bridegroom, who died in 2011 following an accidental fall from the rooftop of a four-story apartment building in Los Angeles. After Bridegroom's death, Crone found himself cut off and deprived of any legal protection. The film tells the story of their six-year-long relationship, and the struggles Crone faced after Bridegroom's death, including the family not allowing Crone to attend the funeral of his life partner.

== Production ==
The film had its origins in It Could Happen to You, a short film Crone released on YouTube in 2012 to mark the first anniversary of Bridegroom's death. Following extensive promotion of the video through social networking, Bloodworth-Thomason, who had once met the couple at a wedding in Palm Springs, California, contacted Crone about expanding it into a full-length film. Production began in the summer of 2012.

The film's budget of $384,375 was raised on the crowd-funding site Kickstarter, outperforming its $300,000 goal and becoming the most-funded documentary film project in the history of crowd-funding to date.

== Music ==
The songs used in the film include original music from the couple's friends; Colleen McMahon (solo and a duet with Tom), Ben Rector (performed by Colleen and Shane), Allison Gray (with Tom on keyboard), several snippets of Tom's own recordings, and a song from Adam Lambert who had met Shane after seeing "It Could Happen To You" on YouTube. Other original songs are performed by Benjy Gaither, Margo Rey, Nathan Young, and Lana Ranahan. The soundtrack also includes popular music from Macklemore & Ryan Lewis and Fun. The soundtrack is listed on iMDb as follows:

No.	Title	Writer(s)	Performer	Length
1.	"Same Love" (produced by Ryan Lewis)	Ben Haggerty	Macklemore & Ryan Lewis feat. Mary Lambert
2.	"When a Heart Breaks"	Ben Rector	Shane Bitney Crone & Colleen McMahon
3.	"Carry On" (produced by Jeff Bhasker)	Nate Ruess, Andrew Dost, Jack Antonoff & Jeff Bhasker	Fun.
4.	"Outlaws of Love" (produced by Rune Westberg)	Adam Lambert, Rune Westberg & BC Jean	Adam Lambert
5.	"The Dance"	Tony Arata & Benjy Gaither	Nathan Young
6.	"Here With You"	Benjy Gaither	Benjy Gaither
7.	"This Holiday Night"	Margo Rey & Barrett Yeretsian	Margo Rey
8.	"You Belong to Me"	Pee Wee King, Chilton Price, Redd Stewart & Benjy Gaither	Margo Rey
9.	"Beautiful Boy"	Colleen McMahon	Colleen McMahon
10.	"The Christmas Song" (originally performed by Mel Tormé)	Mel Tormé & Bob Wells	Thomas Bridegroom & Colleen McMahon
11.	"La Mamma Morta"	Umberto Giordano & Benjy Gaither	Lana Ranahan

The original song "If I Fall" performed by Tom and Allison Gray in a scene in the film was never studio recorded, but a video of a home performance of the full song was posted on YouTube in November 2013.

== Reception ==
Bridegroom received very positive reviews; on Rotten Tomatoes, the film holds an 82% "fresh" rating. On Metacritic, the film has an 85/100 rating, indicating "universal acclaim".

Bridegroom has been positively reviewed by the Los Angeles Times, The New York Times, and Variety. "The documentary 'Bridegroom,' written and directed by Linda Bloodworth-Thomason (of Designing Women fame), is a poignant, powerful tale of first love and untimely death as well as a practical, frankly undeniable, plea for marriage equality.... Despite the pain, sadness and vast emotional upheaval depicted here, Bridegroom is also a movie filled with hope and passion, dignity and pride, and many stirring pockets of joy."

Peter Debruge of Variety wrote: "Inspired by a viral YouTube video and deftly directed by Linda Bloodworth-Thomason (Designing Women), Bridegroom is about an unmarried gay couple in their 20s and what happens when one of them dies. That's the simple summary of this simply told but exceptionally moving documentary. What 'Bridegroom' celebrates is not simply gay rights; it's the human spirit." Another review stated, "For many, it's precisely the sort of emotional eye-opener needed for young people to find inspiration and naysayers to reconsider their attitudes.". The reviewer went on to say, "In lieu of telling the story via simple white captions, the documentary relies on straightforward talking-head interviews with Crone's family and the couple's shared circle of friends, who describe how these two closeted small-town guys clicked when they met in Los Angeles, quickly forming the kind of relationship that romantics everywhere envy."

== Distribution ==
Bridegroom made its television premiere on October 27, 2013, on the Oprah Winfrey Network. The film was released for instant streaming on Netflix and on DVD on November 19, 2013.
