= Delta Farce =

- Promotional poster, which parodies the 1987 film Full Metal Jacket
- Directed by: C. B. Harding
- Written by: Bear Aderhold; Tom Sullivan
- Produced by: Alan C. Blomquist; J.P. Williams
- Starring: Larry the Cable Guy; Bill Engvall; DJ Qualls; Danny Trejo; Marisol Nichols; Keith David
- Cinematography: Tom Priestley Jr
- Edited by: Mark Conte
- Music by: James S. Levine
- Production companies: Lionsgate; Shaler Entertainment; Samwilla Productions
- Distributed by: Lionsgate
- Release date: May 11, 2007
- Running time: 90 minutes
- Country: United States
- Language: English
- Box office: $8.7 million

Delta Farce is a 2007 American war comedy film directed by C. B. Harding and stars Bill Engvall, Larry the Cable Guy, DJ Qualls and Danny Trejo. The first film after the Blue Collar Comedy Tour concert films to star both Engvall and Larry the Cable Guy, the title is a play on the Delta Force, one of the United States Army's elite special operations units alongside the Army Rangers and the Green Berets.

It was released by Lionsgate on May 11, 2007 to extremely negative reviews.

== Plot ==
Larry, Bill, and Everett are three down on their luck friends. Larry was a waiter who lost his job after attempting to publicly propose to his girlfriend Karen, who turned out to be cheating and got pregnant by the other man, causing him to insult a customer. Bill is living off a slip and fall lawsuit settlement, but is in an unhappy marriage. Everett is a former police officer who was fired after crashing his car into a nail salon. The three are members of the United States Army Reserve, where their duties consist mostly of drinking and partying at the reserve center once a month. Due to manpower shortages, the three are deployed to Fallujah. Hard-nosed Sergeant Kilgore is assigned to prepare them for activation and deployment.

After a brief period of training, they are shipped to Iraq. During a thunderstorm over northern Mexico, the transport pilots dump their cargo to reduce their load, unaware that the three were asleep in a Humvee that was dropped. Sergeant Kilgore is pulled out along with the cargo. When the three wake up they believe they have arrived in Iraq. Sergeant Kilgore is knocked unconscious in the landing. The three believe he is dead and bury him in a very shallow grave, then proceed to search for insurgents and members of Al-Qaeda. Sergeant Kilgore regains consciousness after they leave and sets off in pursuit of his clueless subordinates.

The three soldiers find themselves in the small village of La Miranda, believing they are helping the town fight off insurgents. The village of La Miranda is plagued by a bandit gang led by Carlos Santana. Chasing away the bandits with a show of firepower, they become heroes to the villagers and capture a bandit to interrogate. Meanwhile, Sergeant Kilgore follows along the path of his subordinates, encountering significant misfortune.

While enjoying the hospitality of La Miranda, the men realize they are in Mexico, not Iraq. Realizing the trouble they are in, the three men decide to help the villagers improve the village. Bill sneaks away from town to call his wife, while Larry and Everett prepare for the bandits' return. Bill is captured by Santana's gang. In a showdown in La Miranda, Larry and Everett recover Bill and chase Santana and his men away. Sergeant Kilgore arrives and is captured by Santana.

The three soldiers decide to follow Santana and his men to their hideout, where Santana's men engage in bizarre entertainment like forcing kidnapped comedians to perform for them and holding lucha libre matches. Everett distracts them by posing as a luchador while Larry and Bill rescue Sergeant Kilgore. Bill and Kilgore plant dynamite in their trucks while Larry rescues Everett. The group escapes as the bandits' trucks explode. Santana and his bandits ride into town on horseback along with a surplus World War II Sherman tank. The group incapacitates the tank with a vintage cannon and rally the townsfolk to resist the bandits.

At that moment, American helicopters and soldiers storm the town. Bill's wife had informed the Pentagon about the three men stranded in Mexico. The State Department covers up the mishap as "Operation Sombrero", a U.S. anti-terrorism operation done with the (retroactive) permission of the Mexican government. Santana's gang is labeled as terrorists to cover up their incompetence.

The four are awarded the Silver Star, and Bill receives the Purple Heart for being shot in the posterior during the final battle. Sergeant Kilgore creates a successful workout program in Miami, Florida, Everett becomes a popular professional wrestler in Mexico, Bill sues the Mexican government for his injuries and uses the money to buy a house in California and Larry founds his own restaurant in Mexico and marries Maria, the daughter of La Miranda's mayor. Carlos is sent into rehab and becomes a comedian.

== Cast ==
- Larry the Cable Guy as Private Larry McCoy
- Bill Engvall as Private Bill Little
- DJ Qualls as Private Everett Shackleford
- Keith David as Master Sergeant Kilgore
- Danny Trejo as Carlos Santana
- Marisol Nichols as Señorita Maria Garcia
- Lisa Lampanelli as Connie
- Jeff Dunham (cameo) as Ken "The Amazing Ken" (with José Jalapeño on a Stick)
- McKinley Freeman as the Airborne Soldier

== Reception ==
On the review aggregator website Rotten Tomatoes, 5% of 43 critics' reviews are positive, with an average rating of 3/10. The website's consensus reads: "Too afraid to be a real satire of the Iraq War, Delta Farce instead devolves into a reprehensible, unfunny mix of slapstick, gay panic, and flatulence jokes." Metacritic, which uses a weighted average, assigned the film a score of 17 out of 100, based on 15 critics, indicating "overwhelming dislike".

John Anderson of Variety wrote: "If three of The Magnificent Seven had been Gomer Pyle, the result might have looked like Delta Farce, a movie rife with fat, fart and Fallujah jokes, but with a subcutaneous wit that has a lot to do with Iraq war fatigue. Frank Scheck of The Hollywood Reporter said the film is in poor taste and even forgetting that, "isn't funny enough to justify its existence." Andy Webster of The New York Times wrote: "Among the many minorities mocked are Muslims, but perhaps the people most insulted are white Southerners, who presumably are expected to embrace one whopping brain-dead metaphor." Jack Mathews of the New York Daily News wrote: "This is a movie where the villains are the comic relief for the comedians, and where the outtakes at the end are better than the film."
