= C. B. Harding =

American film director

C. B. Harding (sometimes credited as CB Harding) is an American film director, screenwriter, producer and cinematographer.

== Producer/Director filmography ==
1. Delta Farce (2007)
2. Blue Collar Comedy Tour: One For the Road (2006)
3. The Ron White Show (2005) (TV)
4. Blue Collar Comedy Tour Rides Again (2004) (TV)
5. The Osbourne Family Christmas Special (2003) (TV)
6. Blue Collar Comedy Tour: The Movie (2003)
7. Loveblind (2000)
8. Passion Cove (2000)
9. The Passenger (1997)
10. Complicity (2012)

== Writer filmography ==
1. Dude... We're Going to Rio (2003)
2. Complicity (2012)

== Cinematographer filmography ==
1. The Passenger(1997)
