= The Ron White Show =

- Written by: Donick Cary
- Directed by: C. B. Harding
- Starring: Ron White

Original release
- Network: The WB
- Release: 2005

The Ron White Show is a 2005 TV special that appeared in the WB in 2005. It starred comedian Ron White, was directed by C.B. Harding and written by Donick Cary. It featured two cartoon segments that are now available on White's official website.

The show was meant to be part of an evening of Blue Collar programming on the WB, which would have also included two episodes of Blue Collar TV and an episode of Bill Engvall's Mobile Home Disaster. However, this only lasted for a single evening, as Ron's show disappeared immediately, and Mobile Home Disaster followed suit soon afterwards.

The only aired episode of The Ron White Show began with White briefly taking in the different pleasures of Las Vegas, followed by a series of short sketches. The show included appearances by "Dr Phil" McGraw and comedians Dave Attell, Rip Taylor, and the trio from Blue Collar TV, Jeff Foxworthy, Bill Engvall, and Larry the Cable Guy.

The show is available on Region 1 DVD from Sony with an ISBN of 1-4049-9988-4.
