= D'oh-in' in the Wind =

- The Simpsons episode
- A promotional poster for the episode showcasing Homer (left), along with guest stars George Carlin and Martin Mull as Munchie (middle) and Seth (right), respectively.
- Episode no.: Season 10; Episode 6
- Directed by: Mark Kirkland; Matthew Nastuk
- Written by: Donick Cary
- Production code: AABF02
- Original air date: November 15, 1998

Guest appearances
- George Carlin as Munchie; Martin Mull as Seth; Yo La Tengo (end theme performance)

Episode features
- Chalkboard gag: "No one cares what my definition of 'is' is"
- Couch gag: A bar comes down over the couch, locking the family in a rollercoaster seat.
- Commentary: Matt Groening; Mike Scully; George Meyer; Donick Cary; Ron Hauge; Mark Kirkland

Episode chronology
| ← Previous "When You Dish Upon a Star" | Next → "Lisa Gets an 'A'" |
- The Simpsons season 10

"D'oh-in' in the Wind" (Note: Also known as "(Annoyed Grunt)-in' in the Wind".) is the sixth episode of the tenth season of the American animated television series The Simpsons. It premiered on the Fox Network in the United States on November 15, 1998. In the episode, Homer travels to a farm owned by Seth and Munchie, two aged hippies who were friends with Homer's mother. After finding out his middle name is "Jay", Homer is drawn to the carefree lifestyle of hippies, and decides to become one himself.

The episode was written by Donick Cary and directed by Mark Kirkland, who was going through a divorce at the time of its production. Due to personal circumstances, Kirkland assigned his assistant director, Matthew Nastuk, to take over the directing duties for a few of the episode's scenes. However, after Nastuk had directed a scene, Kirkland felt better and returned to direct the remainder of the episode. It features the revelation of Homer's middle name, "Jay", a tribute to the titular characters of The Rocky and Bullwinkle Show, who got their middle initial from series creator Jay Ward. The episode guest stars comic actors George Carlin and Martin Mull as Munchie and Seth, respectively. Carlin was suggested by The Simpsons writer Ron Hauge, who was interested in meeting him, although he did not attend the recording session with Carlin and Mull.

In its original broadcast, the episode was seen by approximately 8.4 million viewers, a decrease in viewership from the previous episode. Following the tenth season's home release, "D'oh-in' in the Wind" received mixed reviews from critics, with the stereotypical humor revolving around hippie culture garnering particular criticism.

== Plot ==
After starring in a low-quality worker recruitment commercial directed by Mr. Burns for the Springfield Nuclear Power Plant, Homer decides he wants to be an actor. As he fills out a Screen Actors Guild application at home, Lisa points out that he has only written his middle initial, J, in the blank for his middle name. Neither Homer nor Grampa know the full name, but Grampa takes Homer to a farm where Mona, Grampa's wife and Homer's mother, spent some time during her days as a hippie. The farm is run by two middle-aged hippies, Seth and Munchie, who were very good friends of Mona's. They point out a mural that she painted based on an incident at Woodstock, which is dedicated to Homer and reveals his middle name as "Jay".

Seeing how carefree his life would have been as a hippie, Homer decides to become one. He dons a dirty old poncho left behind by Mona and begins to carry a frisbee, but is dismayed to learn that Seth and Munchie are using the farm as headquarters for an organic juice company, the largest in Springfield. He persuades them to accompany him on a "freak-out" ride through Springfield, disrupting the citizens' daily lives with silly antics. When the three return to the farm afterward, though, they find that Homer's frisbee has jammed the juicing machinery and caused the loss of an entire shipment of the farm's products. Seth and Munchie angrily order Homer to leave.

To set things right, Homer sneaks back to the farm at night, picks and processes all the vegetables he can find, and delivers the juice shipment to Springfield. In so doing, he unknowingly harvests a hidden field of peyote, which Seth and Munchie had intended for their personal use as recreational drugs. The juice causes intense psychedelic hallucinations in those who drink it, and the police quickly trace it to the farm and move in to arrest Homer, Seth, and Munchie. Homer defends Seth and Munchie by placing himself in the officers' path, reminding them of the morals and values from the 1960s, and placing a flower in the barrel of each officer's rifle. When Chief Wiggum fires, Homer ends up hospitalized with one of the flowers lodged in his skull. Dr. Hibbert refuses to either pull it out or prune its leaves so Homer can watch television, saying that he is a doctor rather than a gardener.

== Production ==
"D'oh-in' in the Wind" was written by Donick Cary, and directed by Mark Kirkland and Matthew Nastuk. It was first broadcast on the Fox Network in the United States on November 15, 1998. The idea for the episode was pitched by Cary, who thought it would be amusing to see the citizens of Springfield hallucinating. He then fleshed the concept out, forming its current iteration himself. The episode features the revelation that Homer's middle name is "Jay", which is a "tribute" to animated characters such as Bullwinkle J. Moose and Rocket J. Squirrel from The Rocky and Bullwinkle Show, who got their middle initial from series creator Jay Ward. The name was pitched on for three days by the writers.

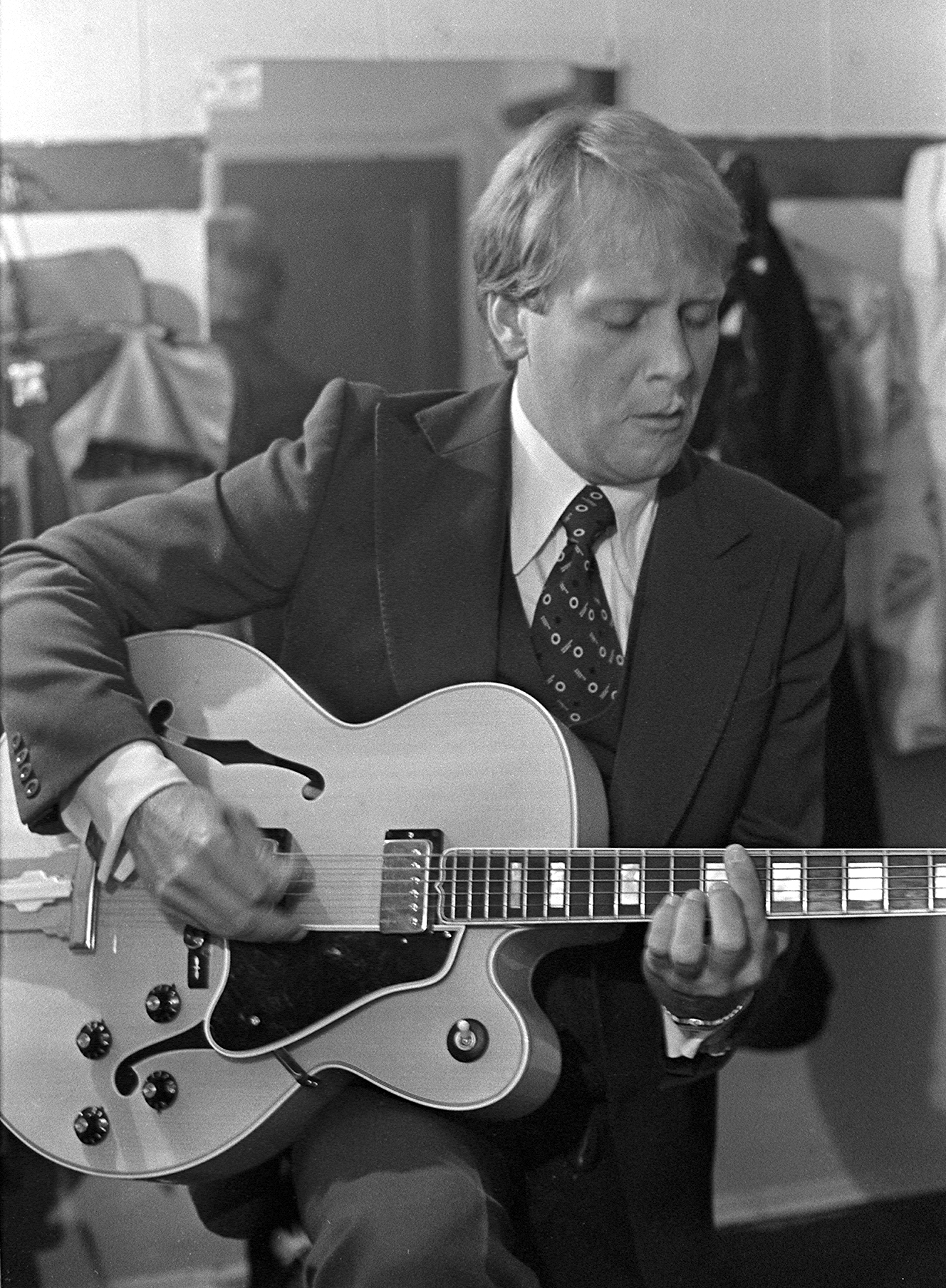
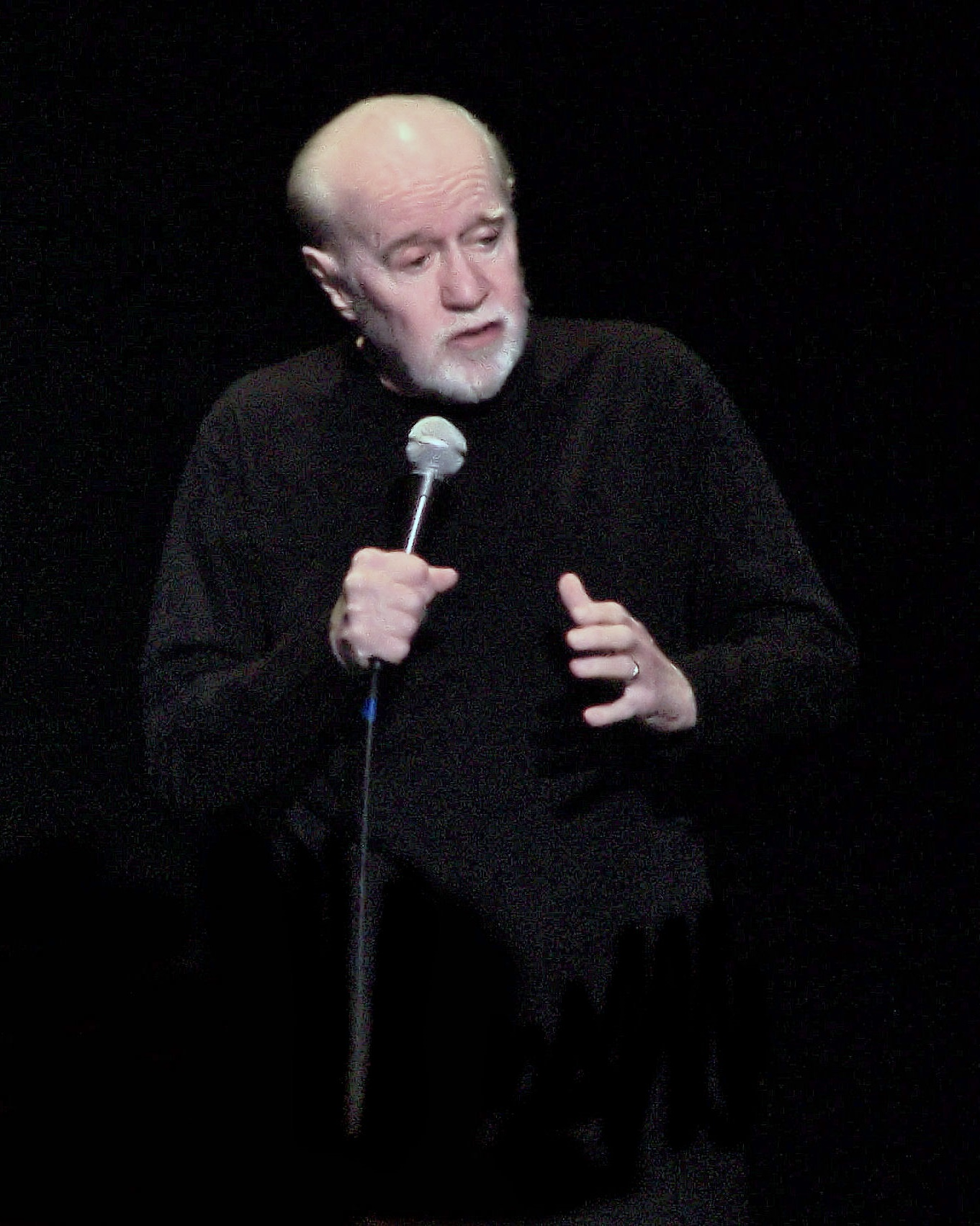
Martin Mull (left) and George Carlin (right) guest-starred as the aging hippies Seth and Munchie in the episode.

Originally, Kirkland was supposed to be the sole director for the episode, however, at the time, he was going through a divorce that he "did not see coming". Because of this, Kirkland assigned his assistant director, Matthew Nastuk, to direct the episode in his stead. However, after having directed a scene, Nastuk claimed that he was "terrified" and wanted Kirkland to continue the direction. Kirkland returned to direct the episode, feeling better after getting over the divorce. Despite the circumstances, Kirkland stated that he "loved" working on the episode, and could relate to the story since he had grown up in a "sort of hippie commune school" in the late '60s and early '70s. Kirkland based a lot of the scenery designs in the episode on the state of Vermont where, according to him, a lot of "ex-hippies" live.

The two hippies, Seth and Munchie, were portrayed by comic actors Martin Mull and George Carlin respectively. For a while, the staff were not sure of who would play Munchie. Although they had decided on Mull to play Seth, the staff were "kind of stuck" on who would play Munchie. Carlin was suggested by Ron Hauge, one of the Simpsons writers, who "really wanted to meet [Carlin]" but ended up not going to the recording session. Scully stated that Mull and Carlin were "some of the funniest guys that ever lived", and that recording their lines was "a lot of fun". Although it does not occur with most other guest stars in the series, Mull and Carlin recorded their lines together. While the designs of Seth and Munchie were not modeled after anyone in particular, their hair-styles were slightly based on those of Jerry Greenfield and Ben Cohen, owners of the ice cream company Ben & Jerry's. Comedian Bob Hope was portrayed by series regular cast member Dan Castellaneta, who plays Homer among many other characters in the series. Jill St. John and Phyllis Diller were both voiced by American voice actress Tress MacNeille. The psychedelic version of The Simpsons' main theme that plays during the end credits was performed by Yo La Tengo, an American alternative rock band who are friends of Cary's.

== Cultural references ==
The episode makes multiple references to 1960s culture, including films such as The Love-Ins (1967). The episode features the theme from the musical Hair, "Incense and Peppermints" by Strawberry Alarm Clock (1967), "White Rabbit" by Jefferson Airplane (1967) and "Time of the Season" by The Zombies (1968). In a flashback to Woodstock in 1969, Jimi Hendrix's performance of "The Star-Spangled Banner" is shown, as is a recreation of the photograph of embracing couple Nick and Bobbi Ercoline taken at the festival and used as a poster for the film Woodstock (1970).

Additionally, Homer sings Billy Joel's 1983 song "Uptown Girl". After drinking the tainted juice, Grampa and Jasper sit on a bench, laughing like the title characters from the series Beavis and Butt-Head, while Flanders hallucinates skeletons and dancing bears (images associated with the Grateful Dead), marching hammers (from Pink Floyd's 1982 film Pink Floyd—The Wall) and The Rolling Stones' lips and tongue logo. Mr. Burns' film is credited as "An Alan Smithee Film", a reference to the Alan Smithee pseudonym credit used by directors who wanted to be disassociated from a film on which they had lost creative control, to the detriment of the final product.

== Reception ==
In its original American broadcast on November 15, 1998, "D'oh-in' in the Wind" received an 8.5 rating, according to Nielsen Media Research, translating to approximately 8.3 million viewers. The episode finished in 40th place in the ratings for the week of November 9–15, 1998. It marked an decrease in viewership from the previous episode, "When You Dish Upon a Star", which had earned a 9.2% rating and drew in 15.34 million viewers. On August 7, 2007, the episode was released as part of The Simpsons - The Complete Tenth Season DVD box set. Matt Groening, Mike Scully, George Meyer, Donick Cary, Ron Hauge and Mark Kirkland participated in the episode's audio commentary.

Following its home video release, "D'oh-in' in the Wind" received mixed reviews from critics. Giving the episode a positive review, Aaron Roxby of Collider wrote that, even though he felt that the jokes about hippies grew tired, he still considered it to be one of the best episodes of the season. James Plath of DVD Town thought fondly of the episode as well, calling it "funny", and noting Martin Mull and George Carlin's guest appearances as highlights. Writing for DVD Movie Guide, Colin Jacobson stated that he considered "D'oh-in' in the Wind" to be a successful spoof of the '60s. However, he also wrote that episodes about the decade had been done a multitude of times before by other shows, which made it feel somewhat uninspired. He enjoyed the way the episode portrayed and mocked the ways aging hippies "didn't live up to their youthful ideas". He concluded his review by writing that "D'oh-in' in the Wind" is one of the season's first high quality episodes.

Conversely, Jake McNeill of Digital Entertainment News did not find the episode enjoyable. Considering it to be one of the worst episodes of the season, he found the jokes regarding hippie culture to be dated, finding the episode to be "a quarter century too late". Gary Russell and Gareth Roberts, of I Can't Believe It's a Bigger and Better Updated Unofficial Simpsons Guide reacted negativity towards the episode as well, finding it hard to watch. They wrote that, aside from a few references to '60s psychedelia and the hippie movement, the only likable part of the episode is the revelation that Homer's middle name is Jay. They finished off their review by stating that the episode failed to deliver meaningful humor.
