= Blue Collar TV =

American sketch comedy television series

- Genre: Sketch comedy
- Created by: Adam Small; Fax Bahr; J.P. Williams; Jeff Foxworthy
- Starring: Jeff Foxworthy; Bill Engvall; Larry the Cable Guy
- Country of origin: United States
- No. of seasons: 2
- No. of episodes: 43

Production
- Production companies: Bahr-Small Productions; Parallel Entertainment; Riverside Productions; Warner Bros. Television

Original release
- Network: The WB
- Release: July 29, 2004 – July 26, 2006

Blue Collar TV is an American sketch comedy television series that aired on The WB from July 29, 2004, to July 26, 2006, starring Jeff Foxworthy, Bill Engvall, and Larry the Cable Guy. The show's humor dealt principally with contemporary American society, and especially hillbilly, redneck, and Southern stereotypes. The show was greenlighted on the heels of the success of the Blue Collar Comedy Tour, which the series' three lead actors toured with in the 2000s. It was created by Fax Bahr and Adam Small, in addition to J.P. Williams and Jeff Foxworthy. "Blue collar" is an American phrase used to describe manual laborers, as opposed to white collar for office or professional workers.

== Overview ==
Unlike most sketch comedy programs, each episode of Blue Collar TV was generally centered on a theme, which Foxworthy revealed at the start of each episode. Themes included "Food", "Kids", and "Stupidity", among others, with Foxworthy generally performing a short comic monologue based on the theme. Most sketches in each episode featured at least one of the three Blue Collar Comedy Tour veterans in an acting role (including almost all from the first season), but the second season saw more sketches featuring the six other cast members exclusively.

=== Recurring sketches ===
- "Bad Jobs for Take Your Daughter to Work Day": This sketch features Foxworthy, Engvall, or Larry the Cable Guy at a job with their "daughter" tagging along. Their job is always something that would make Take Your Daughter-To Work Day awkward, such as a NASCAR driver or a newscaster.
- "Big Kids": Foxworthy, Engvall and Larry the Cable Guy play Ronnie, Blake, and Dooley, three toddlers who constantly misbehave and annoy their parents, usually from the back seat of their car.
- "Bill the Bad Storyteller": Bill Engvall tries to tell a story to his friends, but he is unable to tell it very well. In most cases, the story starts off interesting or creepy, but the conclusion is very plain and boring.
- "Dan Grogan": Grogan (Foxworthy) is the spokesman and owner of Dan Grogan's House of Gravy and Gravy Spa. Grogan's company also makes and sells Pre-Chewed Food and Ranch Cleanser. Grogan's restaurants and spas are well known for their "Gravy Bombs" (balloons filled with brown gravy) and appearances by "Sergeant Gravy (Engvall) and Davey the Gravy Dog".
- "Dinner with...": After a short skit featuring a character saying who he would not want to be invited over for dinner, the scenario is shown featuring a typical family, with that very person over for dinner. The dinner guests have included Hank Williams Jr., Joe Rogan, and Jeff Jarrett.
- "Fat Family": Engvall, Brooke Dillman, and Ayda Field play a family of morbidly obese people, though they are proud of their physical state and do not like skinny people or the thought of losing weight. Their appearances usually revolve around normal sitcom happenings, though modified to suit their happiness of their weight.
- "Martha Stewart's Tips from the Inside": Martha Stewart (Dillman) gives household hints from jail, each hint inspired by her prison experiences.
- "The Martin Bros.": Casey, Jack, and Dale Martin (Foxworthy, Engvall, and Larry the Cable Guy), are three unruly brothers who drink all the time, play jokes on people, and never take anything seriously. They were first seen hosting the show "Hick Eye for the Queer Guy", and later opened a party planning company.
- "On the Red Carpet with Dee and Engle Barry": Dee and Engle (Foxworthy and Larry the Cable Guy) interview big names in country music at the Country Music Awards red carpet pre-show.
- "Politically Correct Fairy Tales": Larry the Cable Guy reads fairy tales that are now politically correct from his niece's (or nephew's) fairy tale book ("Snow Caucasian and the Seven Handy Capable Little Persons", for example) to the children. He is not impressed with the stories in their new state, and usually stops before the story is finished (except for "The Tortoise and the Hare in the Non-Competitive Fun Run") to explain "how it really ends", which usually involves him going into the story, and abruptly ending it (for example, in "Vertically-Challenged Native American Riding Hood and the Endangered Wolf", he ends the story by saying "I go in there, I shoot the wolf, send Grandma to an old folks home, get Little Red Riding Hood out of that hood, and shack up and eat wolf steaks."). Other "Politically Correct Fairy Tales" that have been told by Larry the Cable Guy include:
  - "Jack and the Organic Beanstalk" (formerly known as Jack and the Beanstalk).
  - "'Twas The Night Before A Non-Denominational Winter Holiday" (formerly known as 'Twas the Night Before Christmas).
  - "A Child's Guide to Health and Wellness" (formerly known as Hansel and Gretel).
- "The Redneck Dictionary": On each episode, an entry in "The Redneck Dictionary" is shown, where cast members take common words and morph them into perceived redneck speech. An example would be "artichoke" (I "artichoke" the feller who told me to order this). The only recurring sketch used in every episode, it is based on an element of Jeff Foxworthy's stand-up act. "The Redneck Dictionary" itself is jokingly published by Hatfield-McCoy, a parody of Merriam-Webster.
- "Redneck Yard of the Week": Each week, Foxworthy and Ayda Field present a Redneck Yard of the Week, as submitted by home viewers to http://www.redneckyard.com. The presentation is done like an awards ceremony, with Foxworthy providing commentary on the winning yard after the yard is shown.
- "Rescue 911!": A parody of the television show of the same name, hosted by Jim Farnsworth (Foxworthy). Each episode inexplicably revolves around the Parker family, after Tom (Oldring) gets devastating injuries caused inadvertently by his Grandma, followed by Dad (Larry) calling 911, and the EMTs arriving, where Jim Mayweather (Williams) suffers similar injuries, and Don Clinton (Engvall) saves the day.
- "Tell Me That Don't Stink": Here, Foxworthy has the female cast members (Heath and an audience member also played once each) smell a substance that does not smell very pleasant at all. Smelled items include doe-in-heat urine and valerian root.
- "The Deck": Four friends sit on a deck and tell deck stories, with the humor coming from double entendres involving the similarities between the words "deck" and "dick". The first sketch featured guest star Drew Carey.
- "The Tacketts": A dysfunctional redneck family in a sitcom-like environment. Each episode involves a conflict, usually involving the bickering father and mother (Jeff and Brooke), though each episode ends happily. Also features Larry, Bill, and Ashley as the other members of the family.
- "CSI": based on the television show CSI, it talks about crimes that take place, for example, in the Greensboro Tri-County Area, finds evidence of the crime and finds the criminal.
- "The What Burns Me Booth": A testimonial booth where various people say what burns them up.
- "White Trash Days of Our Lives": A spoof of Days of Our Lives, which Ayda Field co-stars in. Follows the formula of a soap opera, except with redneck characters.
- "Who's the Fool": A game show featuring two contestants listening to humorous stories from Engvall, Foxworthy, and Larry the Cable Guy, then deciding whether or not the story is true.
- Though not technically a recurring sketch, many episodes feature a parody of a television show or film, only featuring Larry the Cable Guy as the star. Such examples have included "The Real Bachelor" (a parody of The Bachelor), "Larry the Spider Guy" (a parody of Spider-Man), and "Handicops" (a parody of COPS).
- "Totes TV": A skit featuring Brooke, Ashley, Ayda and Bill playing women hosting a talk show television show with a sorority background. The girls act out of excitement and talk incoherently whenever they have a celebrity guest on.

== Cast ==
=== Main ===
Note: Due to the show's relatively short life, no cast members were added or removed during the show's run.

- Jeff Foxworthy
- Larry the Cable Guy
- Bill Engvall
- Brooke Dillman
- Ashley Drane
- Ayda Field
- Heath Hyche
- Peter Oldring
- Gary Anthony Williams
- Scott Miller and the Commonwealth, the house band

=== Guest appearances ===
Blue Collar TV had many guest stars during its short run. Sometimes, it was a musical guest that performed at the end of the episode. In most cases, the musical guest also takes part in at least one sketch.

Guests have included:

- Abyss
- Trace Adkins
- Big & Rich
- Clint Black
- Jeremy Borash
- Brooks & Dunn
- Drew Carey
- Deana Carter
- Ronny Cox
- Diana DeGarmo
- Jeff Dunham and Walter
- Fredi Gonzalez, manager for the Atlanta Braves
- Jeff Jarrett
- Christopher Knight
- Adam LaRoche, first baseman for the Atlanta Braves
- Rascal Flatts
- Montgomery Gentry
- Lonestar
- Sterling Marlin
- David Lee Murphy
- Terry Pendleton, hitting coach for the Atlanta Braves
- Billy Redden
- LeAnn Rimes
- Brad Pitt
- Trick Pony
- Mark Richt, head coach of the University of Georgia Bulldogs football team
- John Smoltz, pitcher for the Atlanta Braves
- Heath Slater
- A. J. Styles
- Travis Tritt
- Leon White
- Michael Waltrip
- The Warren Brothers
- Jimmy Wayne
- Don West
- Ron White
- The Georgia Gym Dogs, the University of Georgia's NCAA champion gymnastics team
- Van Zant

== Production ==
Fellow Blue Collar Comedy Tour costar Ron White declined to star on Blue Collar TV due to a fear of being typecast as "blue collar". However, he guest-starred on many episodes of the show. On his 2006 comedy album, You Can't Fix Stupid, White jokingly cited his own lack of work ethic as a reason for not participating more on the show.

The show originated from the Alliance Theatre in Atlanta. Later episodes of season 1 and all episodes of season 2 were taped at the Classic Center in Athens, Georgia, although the show taped at the House of Blues in New Orleans during a two-episode road trip in 2004. Later episodes were recorded during their Blue Collar tour.

The show halted production a few weeks into the 2005 fall season. It was also removed from the WB's lineup. No official statement was given by the WB, though Engvall and Larry the Cable Guy both confirmed the end of Blue Collar TV on their websites.

Blue Collar TV returned on May 31, 2006, to finish airing its second season throughout the summer as filler for the final weeks of the WB, which would shut down later that year. The show did not move to The CW. In summer 2006, Foxworthy started his own show, Foxworthy's Big Night Out, which aired on Country Music Television and retained some aspects of the Blue Collar TV format. It was canceled after one season. The show aired in reruns on Comedy Central's sister network CMT for a time in the early 2010s. In Canada the series aired on The Comedy Network (Now CTV Comedy Channel), CTV, BiteTV (Now Makeful), and CMT.

In 2022, reruns began airing on Circle, a country music and lifestyle-focused digital multicast channel partially owned by Opry Entertainment Group.

== Episodes ==
=== Series overview ===
Season	Episodes	Originally aired	
Season	Episodes	First aired	Last aired
1	30	July 29, 2004	May 19, 2005
2	13	September 25, 2005	July 26, 2006

=== Season 1 (2004–05) ===
No. overall	No. in season	Title	Original release date	Prod. code
1	1	"Family"	July 29, 2004	001
2	2	"Naked"	August 5, 2004	002
3	3	"TV"	August 12, 2004	003
4	4	"Bad Jobs"	August 19, 2004	006
5	5	"Marriage"	August 26, 2004	005
6	6	"Vacations"	September 16, 2004	004
7	7	"Sports"	September 23, 2004	008
8	8	"Funerals"	September 30, 2004	007
9	9	"Music"	October 7, 2004	009
10	10	"Partying"	October 14, 2004	010
11	11	"Getting Sick"	October 21, 2004	011
12	12	"Halloween"	October 28, 2004	012
13	13	"Food"	November 4, 2004	013
14	14	"Education"	November 12, 2004	014
15	15	"Human Body"	November 19, 2004	015
16	16	"Christmas"	December 10, 2004	016
17	17	"Pets"	January 21, 2005	017
18	18	"Buddies"	January 28, 2005	018
19	19	"Fashion"	February 4, 2005	019
20	20	"Fear"	February 11, 2005	020
21	21	"Testosterone"	February 18, 2005	021
22	22	"Battle of the Sexes/Attraction"	February 25, 2005	022
23	23	"Fame"	March 24, 2005	023
24	24	"Stupidity"	March 31, 2005	024
25	25	"Health"	April 14, 2005	025
26	26	"Kids"	April 21, 2005	026
27	27	"Fighting"	April 28, 2005	027
28	28	"Gadgets"	May 5, 2005	028
29	29	"Small Towns"	May 12, 2005	029
30	30	"Law"	May 19, 2005	030

=== Season 2 (2005–06) ===
No. overall	No. in season	Title	Original release date	Prod. code
31	1	"Bad Habits"	September 25, 2005	031
32	2	"Birth"	October 2, 2005	032
33	3	"Dating"	October 9, 2005	035
34	4	"Money"	October 16, 2005	036
35	5	"Lying"	May 31, 2006	033
36	6	"Weddings"	June 7, 2006	034
37	7	"Shopping"	June 14, 2006	037
38	8	"Aliens"	June 21, 2006	038
39	9	"Aging"	June 28, 2006	039
40	10	"Dad"	July 5, 2006	040
41	11	"Violence"	July 12, 2006	041
42	12	"Beauty"	July 19, 2006	042
43	13	"Sinning"	July 26, 2006	043

== Home media ==
Season releases
DVD name	# eps	Release date	Additional information
Season 1 Volume 1	13	November 8, 2005	Boyz in the Woods: A behind-the-scenes look at season 1, Live Comedy No Second Chances, Hatfield-McCoy Redneck Dictionary
Season 1 Volume 2	18	February 7, 2006	Bonus skits, a collection of bloopers and outtakes called "Let's Do That One Again"
The Complete 2nd Season	13	August 1, 2006	Bonus skits and bloopers
The Complete Series	43	2023	All bonuses mentioned above
