= Donick Cary =

American writer and producer

Donick Cary is an American writer and producer.

== Early life ==
Cary grew up on Nantucket Island, graduating from Nantucket High School in 1986.

== Personal life ==
He is the son of actors Richard and Mara Cary and the brother of actress Martha Cary, the latter two of whom have done voices for his show Lil' Bush.

== Career ==
He got his start writing for Late Night with David Letterman. He continued working with the show through its move to CBS, serving as both head writer and the "guy in the bear suit".

After five years in Late Night, Cary moved to The Simpsons, where he served as a co-executive producer for four seasons (seasons 7-11).

He then served in the same capacity on NBC’s Just Shoot Me! and Parks and Recreation, HBO’s Bored to Death, and Fox’s New Girl. Cary has produced pilots for and developed with Brillstein Grey, Sony Television, Happy Madison, Conaco, ABC, NBC, CBS, FOX, FX, HBO, the WB and Nickelodeon.

In 2007, Donick created the animated series Lil' Bush (a satire of U.S. President George Bush Jr.) for Amp'd mobile cell phones. The show was then picked up by Comedy Central and became the first mobi/web-series ever to move from cell phones to television. To handle the animation, Cary founded Sugarshack Animation with offices in Los Angeles, Miami, and Sofia, Bulgaria.

Cary wrote for and produced Silicon Valley for HBO. In 2020, he directed a feature documentary entitled Have a Good Trip (a comic exploration of tripping) for Ben Stiller’s Red Hour Films.

== Writing credits ==
=== The Simpsons episodes ===
Cary has written the following episodes of The Simpsons:

- "In Marge We Trust" (1997)
- "Bart Star" (1997)
- "The Last Temptation of Krust" (1998)
- "Treehouse of Horror IX" ("Hell Toupée") (1998)
- "D'oh-in' in the Wind" (1998)
- "Thirty Minutes over Tokyo" (with Dan Greaney) (1999)
- "Treehouse of Horror X" ("I Know What You Diddily-Iddily-Did") (1999)

=== Complete Savages episodes ===
He has written the following episodes of Complete Savages:

- "Bad Reception"
- "My Two Sons"
- "The Man Without a Ball"

=== Other projects ===
- Dear Doughboy (2000)
- The Ron White Show (2005)
- The Naked Trucker and T-Bones Show (2007)
