= Behavioral Problems =

Studio album by Ron White
- Released: April 21, 2009
- Genre: Comedy
- Label: Capitol

Ron White chronology
You Can't Fix Stupid (2006)	Behavioral Problems (2009)	A Little Unprofessional (2013)

Professional ratings
Review scores
Source	Rating
Allmusic	3.5/5 stars

Behavioral Problems is an album and DVD by American comedian Ron White. The album was released by Capitol Records on April 21, 2009 and peaked at number 1 on the Billboard Top Comedy Albums chart. The DVD was also released on April 21, 2009, containing special features, deleted scenes and all completely uncensored and uncut.

== Track listing ==
1. "Intro" – 0:50
2. "Oscillate" – 2:22
3. "No Dogs Allowed" – 1:08
4. "Don't Shake a Baby" – 2:15
5. "Got in a Little Trouble" – 4:53
6. "Lawyers and Dentists" – 10:29
7. "Tater Tot Goes to Europe" – 4:35
8. "Implants" – 1:02
9. "It's a Busy Couch" – 0:57
10. "The Town Stinks" – 3:03
11. "I Love This Country" – 0:40
12. "UFO Tour" – 1:04
13. "To the Troops" – 1:33
14. "Man Bag" – 1:31
15. "Heightened State of Awareness" – 5:58
16. "I Have a Great Idea" – 3:51
17. "The List" – 0:58
18. "Monogamy" – 2:19
19. "The Lazy Dog" – 2:25
20. "Not a Lot of People Know" – 0:47
21. "Pedicure" – 1:43
22. "All Things Scotch" – 0:51
23. "Take Me to the Liquor Store" – 1:06
24. "Tourette's" – 2:35
25. "Secret Pleasure Zone" – 3:53
26. "A**I" – 1:37
27. "Piercing" – 2:01
28. "It Whistles" – 1:06
29. "NASA Research" – 1:14

== Chart performance ==
Chart (2009)	Peak position
U.S. Billboard Top Comedy Albums	1
U.S. Billboard Top Country Albums	13
U.S. Billboard 200	51
