= Drunk in Public =

Live album by Ron White
- Released: November 3, 2003
- Genre: Comedy
- Label: Hip-O Records
- Producer: John MacDonald

Ron White chronology
| Drunk in Public (2003) | You Can't Fix Stupid (2006) |

Professional ratings
Review scores
| Source | Rating |
|---|---|
| Allmusic | 4.5/5 stars |

Drunk in Public is the first CD released by American comedian Ron White. It was released on November 3, 2003 on the Hip-O Records label. The album has been certified gold by the RIAA.

== Track listing ==
All tracks written by White.

1. "Sunglasses" - 2:05
2. "Truth in Advertising" - 0:50
3. "Plane Crash" - 3:00
4. "Cincinnati Chili" - 1:38
5. "Hurricane George" - 1:32
6. "I Drink Too Much…" - 0:42
7. "Ten Days in Los Angeles" - 2:56
8. "Outlaw Video Games" - 2:28
9. "Cousin Ray" - 3:17
10. "Married a Wealthy Woman" - 3:54
11. "Cheating in Columbus" - 3:13
12. "Osama Bin Laden" - 1:50
13. "Lug Nut Day" - 3:53
14. "Car Salesman" - 1:48
15. "They Call Me 'Tater Salad'" - 6:31

== Charts ==
=== Weekly charts ===
| Chart (2003–04) | Peak position |
|---|---|
| US Billboard 200 | 83 |
| US Top Comedy Albums (Billboard) | 2 |
| US Top Country Albums (Billboard) | 11 |
| US Heatseekers Albums (Billboard) | 2 |

=== Year-end charts ===
| Chart (2004) | Position |
|---|---|
| US Top Country Albums (Billboard) | 40 |

== Certifications ==
| Region | Certification | Certified units/sales |
|---|---|---|
| United States (RIAA) | Gold | 500,000^{^} |
^{^} Shipments figures based on certification alone.
