= Simpson Safari =

- The Simpsons episode
- Episode no.: Season 12; Episode 17
- Directed by: Mark Kirkland
- Written by: John Swartzwelder
- Production code: CABF13
- Original air date: April 1, 2001

Guest appearance
- Frank Welker as assorted animal voices

Episode features
- Chalkboard gag: "I will not flush evidence"
- Couch gag: The family and a lot of acrobats form a kickline, which turns the living room into a large circus extravaganza.
- Commentary: Mike Scully; Ian Maxtone-Graham; Matt Selman; Tim Long; Yeardley Smith; Mark Kirkland; Michael Marcantel

Episode chronology
← Previous "Bye Bye Nerdie"	Next → "Trilogy of Error"
- The Simpsons season 12

"Simpson Safari" is the seventeenth episode of the twelfth season of the American animated television series The Simpsons. It first aired on Fox in the United States on April 1, 2001. When the Simpsons run out of food thanks to a bag boy strike, the family finds an old box of Animal Crackers in their attic. In the box is a golden cracker that was part of a contest conducted by the owners of Animal Crackers. Finding out that anyone that found the golden cracker would win a trip to Africa, Homer shows it to the company's owners, who refuse to honor the prize. When he is injured by one of the box's sharp corners however, the family is given a free trip to Africa as compensation.

Although "Simpson Safari" was written by John Swartzwelder, the idea for the episode was pitched by a former staff writer Larry Doyle. The episode was directed by Mark Kirkland, who had been to Africa as a child. Because of his visit there, Kirkland attempted to make the episode look as authentic as possible, even though the Simpsons trip to Africa was "all over the place" geographically.

The episode features Frank Welker as all the animals in Africa. In its original broadcast, the episode was seen by approximately 7.7 million viewers, finishing in 42nd place in the ratings the week it aired.

Following its broadcast, the episode received mixed reviews from critics. The episode was also nominated for the Primetime Emmy Award for Outstanding Music Composition for a Series in 2001.

== Plot ==
While Marge takes Maggie to the hospital after Maggie swallows an issue of Time magazine whole, Homer, Bart and Lisa go grocery shopping. Homer and other shoppers at the store mistreat the bag boys, resulting in every bag boy and server in Springfield going on strike, which extends to knocking self-packed grocery bags out of the hands of customers. When the Simpsons run out of food in their home, the family follows Santa's Little Helper into the attic, where he finds a 30-year-old box of animal crackers.

Homer bites into a solid-gold giraffe, which is the winning contest piece for a trip to Africa. The animal cracker company initially refused to honor the prize because the contest ended a number of years ago, but when Homer is hit in the eye by a sharp corner of the box, the company gives the Simpsons their Africa trip in order to avoid a lawsuit.

The family lands in Tanzania. When the family is in Africa, their tour guide Kitenge takes them to experience such sights as the Masai Mara, Ngorongoro Crater, Olduvai Gorge, and meet with a group of Maasai tribesmen. During a vigorous tribal dance, Homer accidentally enrages a hippo. It chases after the family, but they manage to escape by using a tribal shield as a raft going down the raging Zambezi river. After surviving the plunge over Victoria Falls, the family eventually reach Mount Kilimanjaro and stumbles upon a nearby chimpanzee sanctuary maintained by the scientist Dr. Joan Bushwell (a parody of Jane Goodall). She claims to be researching the animals' behavior when a group of poachers arrives to take the chimps.

The Simpsons try to hold off the poachers, but eventually, they break into the sanctuary. The poachers are revealed to be Greenpeace activists, who prove that Dr. Bushwell is a chimp slave master, exploiting their labor at a nearby diamond mine. Worried that the Simpsons will report her to the authorities, Dr. Bushwell offers everyone diamonds as a bribe, which all the Simpsons except Lisa happily accept. On the plane ride back to Springfield, it is revealed that Kitenge is now president of the country, with the former president now the Simpsons' flight attendant. The Simpsons laugh as their plane flies off.

== Production ==
"Simpson Safari"'s setpiece shows some of Springfield's citizens mistreating the bag boys in a grocery store, prompting the bag boys to go on strike. The sequence was inspired by an Albertsons store in Los Angeles, whose employees went on strike at the time the episode was written. The idea to have the Simpsons visit Africa was pitched by former staff writer Larry Doyle. Former staff writer John Swartzwelder was then assigned to write the first draft of the episode's script. Because of his involvement with the episode, "Simpson Safari" contains several "classic" Swartzwelder-type jokes, according to staff writer Matt Selman. Examples of these include the cover of the Animal Cracker box and Homer and Dr. Joan Bushwell's discussion about the smell of feces in the doctor's hut. After Swartzwelder wrote the first draft, the writing staff rewrote the script. When writing the episode, the writers deliberately included factual errors to annoy viewers who wanted the series to seem realistic. Commenting on the episode, Selman said "It's kind of a combination of really nice, observational designs and then just [...] things that are deliberately wrong. To anger people who care about things being real."

Mark Kirkland, who had visited Africa before, served as the director for "Simpson Safari". When he was sixteen years old, Kirkland spent six weeks in Kenya with a film crew that was making a documentary film called A Visit to a Chief's Son. When he first read the script, he found that the episode was "all over the place" geographically. "It would be like in the United States, saying: 'I walked out of Grand Central Station and then I turned left and was standing on the south rim of the Grand Canyon.' The locations are just all over the place" he said in the episode's DVD commentary. Still, Kirkland strove to make the episode look as realistic as possible by drawing influence from his experience in Kenya.

For example, the steering column on Kitenge's Land Rover is placed on the right side of the car. At one point in the episode, the Simpsons visit the Maasai people, a Nilotic ethnic group of semi-nomadic people located in Kenya and northern Tanzania. The way that some of the Maasai people in the episode are dancing is also true to a traditional dance performed by Maasai people in real life, and although the drinking of cow blood is faithful to the Maasai people's culture, the use of lip plates and neck rings are not. "That was kind of fun for me to try to make this stuff [...] as crazy as the story is, [to] make it realistic", Kirkland commented on directing the episode.

In a scene in the episode, the Simpsons are floating down a river on a shield. At one point, the family is seen by two Africans, who speak in Kiswahili. Additionally, the song that Kitenge sings when driving the Simpsons ("Wé-Wé" by Angélique Kidjo) was a popular song in Africa. In order to make it sound accurate, Hank Azaria, who portrays Kitenge in the episode, was taught to sing the song phonetically by a professor in Swahili in the University of California, Los Angeles. Dr. Joan Bushwell, the "Jane Goodall-type" character in the episode, was portrayed by American voice actress Tress MacNeille, who also voices Lindsey Naegle among other characters in the series. All animals' noises (except for Santa's Little Helper, who is voiced by main cast member Dan Castellaneta) were done by American voice actor Frank Welker.

== Release ==
In its original American broadcast on April 1, 2001, "Simpson Safari" received a 7.5 rating, according to Nielsen Media Research, translating to approximately 7.7 million viewers. The episode finished in 42nd place in the ratings for the week of March 26-April 1, 2001, tying with an episode of the television newsmagazine Dateline NBC. Later that year, the episode was nominated for a Primetime Emmy Award in the category of Outstanding Music Composition for a Series (Dramatic Underscore). It ultimately lost to an episode of the science fiction series Star Trek: Voyager. Since its broadcast, the episode has been released twice on home video. On May 23, 2005, it was released along with the season 10 episode "Thirty Minutes over Tokyo", the season 13 episode "Blame It on Lisa" and the season 15 episode "The Regina Monologues" as part of a DVD set called Simpsons Around The World In 80 D'ohs. On August 18, 2009, the episode was released as part of a DVD set called The Simpsons: The Complete Twelfth Season. Mike Scully, Ian Maxtone-Graham, Matt Selman, Tim Long, Yeardley Smith, Mark Kirkland and Michael Marcantel participated in the audio commentary for the episode.

Former The Simpsons' showrunner Mike Reiss stated, at an April 2007 talk in Bristol, Connecticut, that "Simpson Safari" is one of two of the show's episodes that he dislikes.

Following its home video release, "Simpson Safari" received mixed reviews from critics.

In his review of The Simpsons: The Complete Twelfth Season, Colin Jacobson of DVD Movie Guide described the episode as "lousy". While he admitted that he found a couple of scenes funny, he argued that the episode over relied on broad gags and "never threatens to become inspired or amusing". He concluded by describing the episode as "disappointing".

Writing for Bullz-Eye.com, Will Harris gave the episode a negative review as well. He argued that the premise was "ridiculous", and that the episode "remind[s] longtime fans that the show's days of complete comedic perfection are behind them."

On the other hand, DVD Verdict's Mac McEntire was entertained by the episode. Although he mostly enjoy episodes that are "down-to-Earth" and emphasize the Simpson family, McEntire wrote that the "less realistic, more over-the-top crazy" episodes like "Simpson Safari" comprises the season's best episodes.

DVD Talk's Jason Bailey wrote that "Simpson Safari" makes use of one of his favorite story elements that he called a "wandering storyline". "Their habit of using the first act as a red herring, only semi-connected to the rest of the show, is ingenious and hilarious", he wrote. "'Simpson Safari', for example, begins with an extended bit about a bagboy strike, which leads the family to desperate culinary measures, which then leads Homer to a box of animal crackers in the attic, which then leads to the discovery of a prize inside the box for the safari trip that encompasses the rest of the episode. They'd been doing this kind of thing for years, but it still plays".
