= When You Dish Upon a Star =

- The Simpsons episode
- Episode no.: Season 10; Episode 5
- Directed by: Pete Michels
- Written by: Richard Appel
- Production code: 5F19
- Original air date: November 8, 1998

Guest appearances
- Alec Baldwin as himself; Kim Basinger as herself; Ron Howard as himself; Brian Grazer as himself

Episode features
- Chalkboard gag: "butt.butt is not my e-mail address"
- Couch gag: Marge carries a laundry basket and hangs wet sheet versions of Homer, Bart, Lisa, and Maggie on a clothesline in the living room.
- Commentary: Mike Scully; Ron Hauge; Matt Selman; Richard Appel; Pete Michels

Episode chronology
← Previous "Treehouse of Horror IX"	Next → "D'oh-in' in the Wind"
- The Simpsons season 10

"When You Dish Upon a Star" is the fifth episode of the tenth season of the American animated television series The Simpsons. It originally aired on Fox in the United States on November 8, 1998. When the family spends the day at Lake Springfield, Homer meets Alec Baldwin and Kim Basinger (voicing themselves), who are hiding from the media in their secluded summer home. Homer starts to work for them, developing a good friendship, but he soon reveals their secrets to the public, damaging his new friendship with them. It was the last Simpsons episode written by Richard Appel, and was directed by Pete Michels.

== Plot ==
Bart and Lisa persuade their parents to spend the day at Lake Springfield. While there, Homer attempts parasailing and is involved in an accident when he tells Marge to send him up far too high; as a result, his rope detaches. He crashes through a skylight and into the bedroom of Alec Baldwin and Kim Basinger's secluded summer home. The couple and Homer become acquainted. Homer convinces the couple to allow him to be their assistant, while keeping it secret that the celebrity couple are in Springfield. Homer, at first, works well with the couple, and they all become good friends. Homer also befriends Ron Howard when he visits the couple, and soon attempts to pitch a screenplay for a movie starring Baldwin and Basinger with Howard to direct, much to his chagrin, about a "killer robot driving instructor that travels back in time for some reason," as well as a talking pie, the robot's best friend.

Due to his inability to keep a secret, Homer eventually releases the information that Baldwin and Basinger are in Springfield, and the couple's house is discovered by Springfield citizens and the media. Baldwin and Basinger are furious at Homer for breaking their trust, and immediately end their friendship with him and kick him out of their house. Homer sadly walks to the gate while being pelted with rocks by the citizens. Bitter about losing his celebrity friends and once again feeling like a nobody, Homer begins a mobile museum, entitled "Museum of Hollywood Jerks", which displays the couple's personal belongings in an attempt to expose them as being selfish and uncaring. Basinger, Baldwin, and Howard discover the museum while intending to apologize to Homer. A high-speed chase quickly ensues between Homer, in his mobile museum, and the celebrities in their Hummer. Homer agrees to stop after Howard is injured during the chase. Homer is ordered by a court of law to remain 500 miles away from any celebrity, both living or dead. One month later, Howard pitches Homer's screenplay from earlier to Brian Grazer of 20th Century Fox.

== Production ==
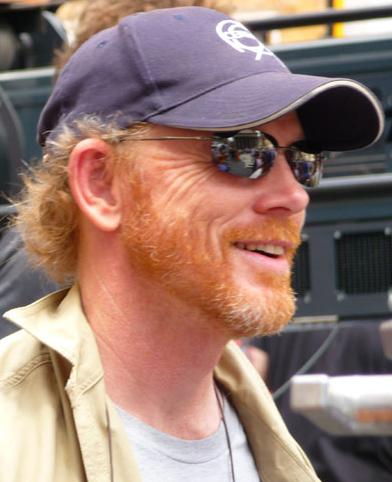
Ron Howard guest starred as himself in the episode.

During the opening sequence, Bart originally wrote "butt.com" on the chalkboard, however, it was modified to butt.butt, due to butt.com being a real website. The storyline of famous celebrities moving to Springfield was pitched by Mike Scully; Scully originally pitched Bruce Springsteen as the celebrity to move to town, however, Springsteen turned down the opportunity to appear. Richard Appel then offered the guest appearance opportunity to Bruce Willis and Demi Moore, but they too turned down the offer. Appel then offered Alec Baldwin and Kim Basinger the opportunity to provide their voices, and they agreed to guest star in the episode. The episode was originally intended to be directed by Mike B. Anderson, but it was held over from season 9 and Pete Michels directed it.

In December 2008, in an interview, Ron Howard commented that guest voicing himself "was an honour. Probably, from my kids' perspective, my coolest turn." Howard once again guest starred on The Simpsons as himself in the season eleven episode "Hello Gutter, Hello Fadder" (1999). Howard was set to appear in "Children of a Lesser Clod" (2001), but dropped out for unknown reasons.

The author of the 2003 book Ron Howard: From Mayberry to the Moon… and Beyond, Beverly Gray, noted that by playing himself in these episodes, "Howard showed once again that he could laugh at his own public persona. His appearances on The Simpsons also suggest how much he remains an American icon, long after the end of his acting career. It's rare indeed for a director or producer to be as instantly recognizable as most Hollywood stars."

One gag near the end of the episode had a sign with the 20th Century Fox logo on it with the line "A Division of Walt Disney Co" under it. Predictably, on December 14, 2017, Disney announced its intention to purchase 20th Century Fox's parent company, 21st Century Fox. It also included several franchises from 20th Century Fox (now 20th Century Studios) that Disney purchased such as The Simpsons, alongside X-Men, Deadpool, and Fantastic Four; the acquisition was completed on March 20, 2019.

== Cultural references ==
The episode title is a reference to the 1940 film Pinocchio, which features the song "When You Wish Upon a Star". At the beginning of the episode, Homer has a dream that is a spoof of Hanna-Barbera's series The Yogi Bear Show (1961), with Homer as Yogi Bear, Bart as Boo Boo and Ned as Ranger Smith. He then dreams he is Magilla Gorilla and mauls Mr. Peebles after he takes his banana. The episode contains multiple references to the series Happy Days, in which Ron Howard played Richie Cunningham. Homer mistakenly refers to Howard as "Potsie" (another Happy Days character) and "Horshack" (a character from Welcome Back, Kotter played by Ron Palillo). When Howard secures the movie deal with Homer's screenplay, a snippet of the Happy Days theme song is played. The time machine drawing in Homer's screenplay contains a Flux capacitor, the device from the film Back to the Future (1985). The drinks wobbling as the townspeople approach Kim Basinger and Alec Baldwin's house is a reference to the film Jurassic Park (1993). Posters for 9½ Weeks (1986) and L.A. Confidential (1997), both starring Basinger, are seen in Homer's museum. At the end of the episode, Brian Grazer has a poster of the movie Titanic (1997) in his office.

== Reception ==
"When You Dish Upon a Star" finished 32nd in the weekly ratings for the week of November 2–8, 1998 with a Nielsen rating of 9.2. In his review of The Simpsons' tenth season, James Plath of Dvdtown.com noted "When You Dish upon a Star" was written to be "one of the funnier episodes". In a Simpsons flashback review, Robert Canning of IGN reviewed the episode positively, commenting "I'm not saying this episode is one of the greatest the series has ever produced, but it is very, very funny, and it features one of my all-time favorite guest performances." The authors of the book I Can't Believe It's a Bigger and Better Updated Unofficial Simpsons Guide, Warren Martyn and Adrian Wood, wrote in a negative review: "Despite three very high-profile guest actors, this episode is really rather dull and uninspired. The only real moment of interest is the car chase at the end, and Kim Basinger's delightfully self-deprecating quips about her constant adoration of her Oscars, Alec Baldwin apparently not having one himself." IGN rated Ron Howard as the twelfth-greatest guest appearance on The Simpsons. Total Film's Nathan Ditum ranked Baldwin and Basinger's performances as the second-best guest appearances in the show's history.
