= Thirty Minutes over Tokyo =

- The Simpsons episode
- Episode no.: Season 10; Episode 23
- Directed by: Jim Reardon
- Written by: Donick Cary; Dan Greaney
- Production code: AABF20
- Original air date: May 16, 1999

Guest appearances
- George Takei as Wink; Denice Kumagai as Japanese mother; Karen Maruyama as Japanese stewardess; Gedde Watanabe as Japanese father and waiter; Keone Young as Sumo wrestler

Episode features
- Chalkboard gag: "I'm so very tired"
- Couch gag: The Simpsons sit on the couch, but get sucked inside and come out on shredded paper.
- Commentary: Matt Groening; Mike Scully; Donick Cary; George Meyer; Ron Hauge; Matt Selman; Jim Reardon

Episode chronology
| ← Previous "They Saved Lisa's Brain" | Next → "Beyond Blunderdome" |
- The Simpsons season 10

"Thirty Minutes over Tokyo" is the twenty-third and final episode of the tenth season of the American animated television series The Simpsons. It first aired on Fox in the United States on May 16, 1999. In the episode, after being robbed by Snake Jailbird, the Simpsons visit a money-saving seminar, where they learn ways to limit their expenses. Soon, the family can afford a cheap last-minute flight to another country, the only disadvantage being that they do not know where their plane tickets will bring them, which leads them to spend their vacation in Japan.

The episode was written by Donick Cary and Dan Greaney, while Jim Reardon served as director. It was one of the last episodes written in its production line, and its title is a reference to the war film Thirty Seconds Over Tokyo. Several guest-stars appeared in the episode, including George Takei as the host for The Happy Smile Super Challenge Family Wish Show. This episode parodies aspects of Japanese culture, including the stereotype of the Japanese game shows.

The episode was seen by approximately 8 million viewers in its original broadcast. In 2005, the episode was first released on home video, and in 2007, it was released as part of the tenth season DVD box set.

== Plot ==
While visiting an Internet café with Bart and Lisa, Homer is cyber-robbed by Snake, who downloads the savings that the family planned to use for a vacation. Homer attempts to save money by burgling Ned Flanders, who catches him and explains that he learned thrifting strategies from attending the Chuck Garabedian Mega-Savings Seminar. Homer steals Ned's tickets for the next seminar, where he and Marge learn they can afford a family vacation by buying unclaimed airline tickets for a discount price.

The family wait at the airport for a cancellation and claim tickets from the Flanders for Tokyo. Arriving in Japan, with Lisa wanting to explore the local culture, the family eat at an American-themed restaurant before Homer and Bart attend a sumo match. When his pretzel is stolen by a wrestler, Homer subdues him (with the help of Bart) before throwing Emperor Akihito, after mistaking him for another wrestler, into a receptacle of worn mawashi. He and Bart are put in jail and bailed out by Marge, leaving the family with a single million yen note. To cheer up a disappointed Lisa, Homer makes the note into an origami crane, which subsequently blows away in the wind.

Needing to earn the money to return home, the family work in a fish-gutting factory in Osaka, where they happen upon a TV game show called The Happy Smile Super Challenge Family Wish Show, where winners are given a prize of their choice. They go on the show and are subject to humiliating challenges at the behest of the host Wink in order to win plane tickets to Springfield. Their final challenge has them collect the tickets from a rickety bridge over an active volcano, which they succeed at but fall into the lava, which turns out to be Orangeade with added wasabi. The Simpsons finally leave Japan, though their flight out is briefly halted by four giant monsters – Godzilla, Mothra, Gamera, and Rodan.

== Production ==
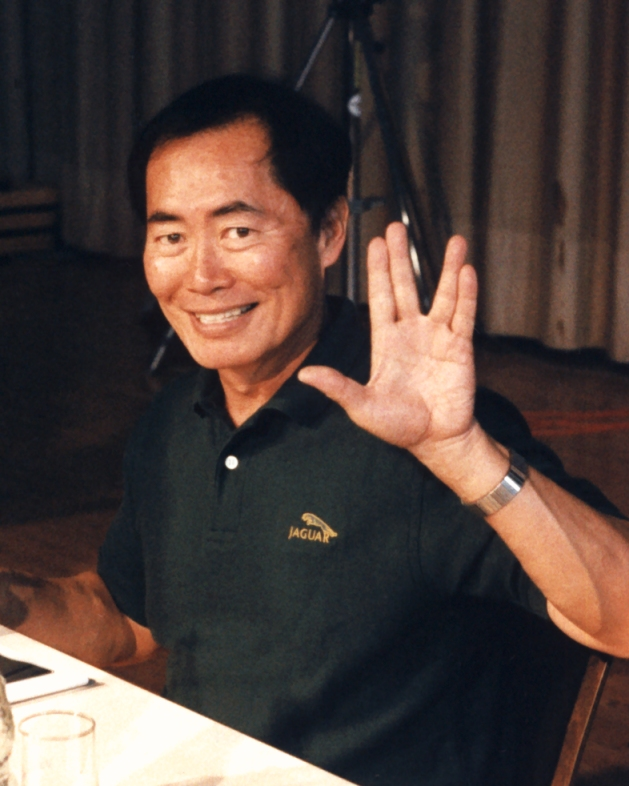
George Takei, one of The Simpsons staff's "favorite guest-stars", portrayed Wink, the game show host in the episode.

The episode, which was originally titled "Fat Man and Little Boy" (which went on to be used for the name of a season 16 episode), was directed by Jim Reardon and written by Donick Cary and Dan Greaney. It was first broadcast on the Fox network in the United States on May 16, 1999. "Thirty Minutes over Tokyo" was one of the last episodes produced for the series' tenth season. Staff writers Cary and Greaney wrote the draft in a couple of days, and it was then rewritten "extensively" with The Simpsons' writing staff. Originally, there would be a long scene about how Homer had bought a "pre-Columbian vase" on the Internet, however the scene was ultimately cut from the episode. The episode's title is a reference to the 1944 war film 30 Seconds Over Tokyo. Originally, the staff wanted the title to be "Twenty-two Minutes over Tokyo", since an episode of The Simpsons is approximately twenty-two minutes long, but they eventually changed it to its current rendition because it “sounds closer to” the title of the film it references. According to Cary, the writers did a lot of research in order to accurately depict the Japanese language for the episode. For example, the three categories in The Happy Smile Super Challenge Family Wish Show are written in Japanese.

In the scene at the seminar, a character closely resembling the mascot of Hasbro's Monopoly can be seen sitting next to Mr. Burns. Because the design is slightly different from the real-life mascot, the Simpsons staff did not have to pay Hasbro for using their character in the episode. The design of Homer in a Jamaican attire was very popular among the staff, and Mike Scully, the showrunner for the episode, called the design "great". A scene in the episode shows Homer buying a square watermelon, which turns out to be round and slips out of his hands. In the background, cars are driving on the left side of the street. Originally, the animators had drawn the cars driving on the right side. However, Tomi Yamaguchi, a Simpsons layout artist at the time, pointed out that cars in fact drive on the left side of the street in Japan. Because of this, the animators had to redraw the whole scene, and Yamaguchi received a technical advisor credit for the episode. The speech that Homer gives to the audience in The Happy Smile Super Challenge Family Wish Show was originally much longer, and would partially involve kitchenettes from Broyhill. The design of the male Canadian in the game show was based on Canadian Simpsons director Neil Affleck.

The anime version of The Simpsons' theme song that plays at the end of the episode was conceived by composer Alf Clausen. Chuck Garabedian, the speaker at the seminar, was portrayed by series regular voice actor Hank Azaria, who plays Moe Szyslak among other characters. The Japanese waiter in Americatown was played by American actor Gedde Watanabe. Wink, the host for The Happy Smile Super Challenge Family Wish Show, was portrayed by George Takei. Takei has appeared on The Simpsons several times before, and he is, according to Scully, one of the staff's favorite guest-stars. The episode also features the voices of Tress MacNeille, Denice Kumagai as Japanese mother, Karen Maruyama as Japanese stewardess, Keone Young as the sumo wrestler, and Karl Wiedergott as both Mr. Monopoly and Woody Allen.

== Themes and cultural references ==
In his book Gilligan Unbound, American literary critic Paul Cantor described how "Thirty Minutes over Tokyo" references and mocks several aspects of Japanese and American culture, as well as differences between the two. The Hello Kitty factory from Sanrio is featured. At a sumo wrestling match, Bart and Homer encounter the then current Japanese emperor, Akihito. After Homer throws him into a trunk of sumo thongs, Bart and Homer are put in jail, where they have to re-enact a kabuki play about the forty-seven Ronin, do origami, flower arranging and meditation. After Marge bails them out, Bart and Homer can speak fluent Japanese, and have fully absorbed, as Cantor writes, the "exclusionary" character of the Japanese culture, as Homer asks Bart (in Japanese, with English subtitles): "Should we tell them [Marge and Lisa] the secret to inner peace?", to which Bart replies (still in Japanese), "No, they are foreign devils." The episode also references the Japanese's adaption to American culture, and is, according to Cantor, "filled" with signs of how eagerly Japanese have taken to American culture. In one scene, the Simpsons eat at a restaurant called Americatown, filled with US memorabilia and having only American items on the menu. Another scene shows director Woody Allen filming a commercial for Japanese television.

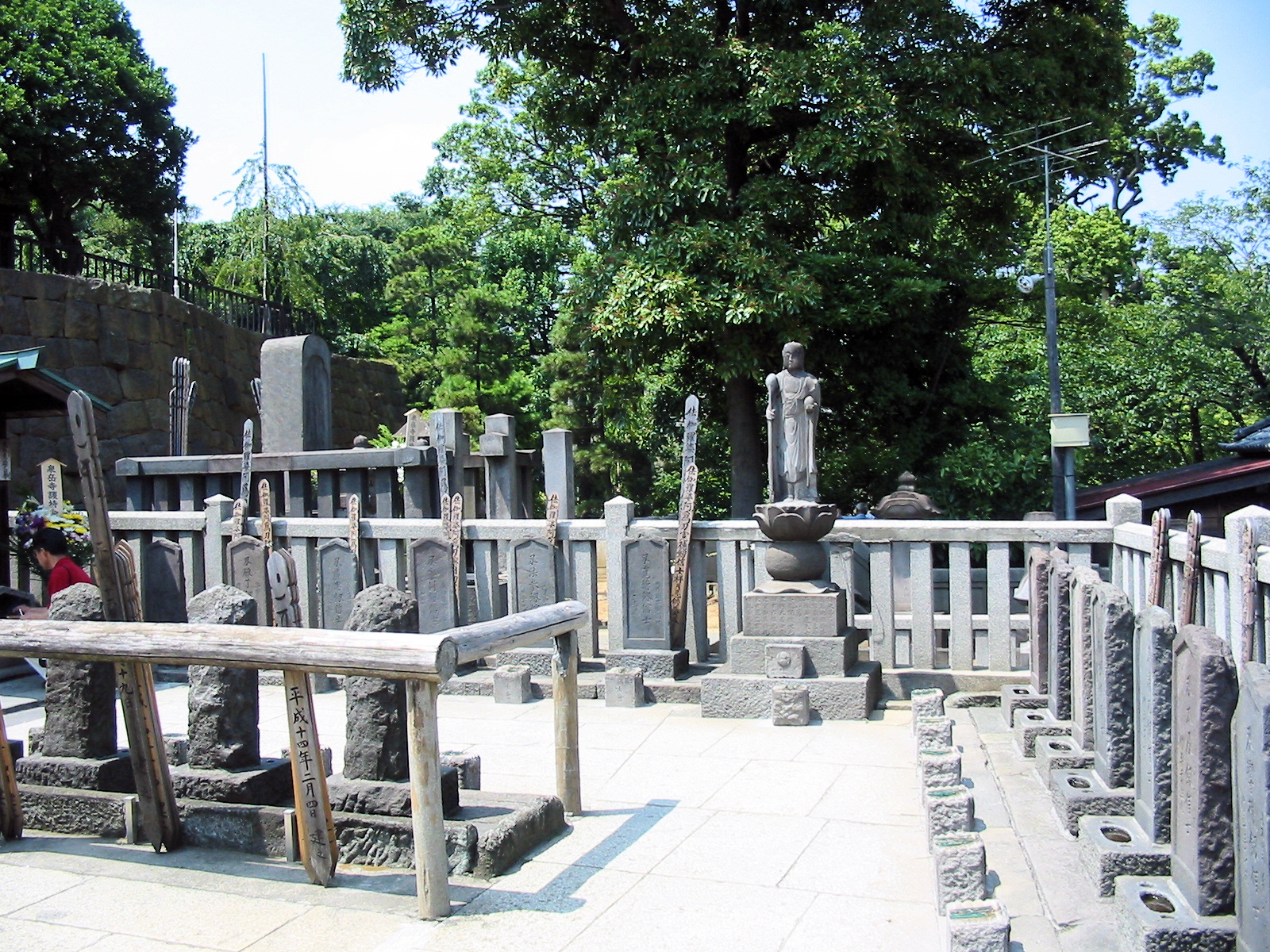
The episode lampoons several aspects of Japanese culture. This image depicts the graves of the forty-seven Ronin, of whom Bart and Homer participate in a kabuki play.

In order to get back to the United States, the Simpsons have to enter a humiliating game show called The Happy Smile Super Challenge Family Wish Show. According to Cantor, this is where the family finds a difference between Japanese and American culture, as Wink, the game-show host, explains to them: "Our game shows are a little different from yours. Your shows reward knowledge. We punish ignorance."

The computers seen in the internet café that the Simpsons visit in the beginning of the episode are based on the Apple iMac computers. In a scene inside Flanders' kitchen, a note that reads "1 COR 6:9–11" can be seen. This refers to the Bible, 1 Corinthians, chapter 6, verses 9 to 11: "Or do you not know that the unrighteous will not inherit the kingdom of God? Do not be deceived: neither the sexually immoral, nor idolaters, nor adulterers nor men who practice homosexuality, nor thieves nor the greedy, nor drunkards nor revilers, nor swindlers will inherit the kingdom of God. And such were some of you. But you were washed, you were sanctified, you were justified in the name of the Lord Jesus Christ and by the Spirit of our God." The cups in the 33 cent store read That '70s Show, a reference to which Danny Masterson, one of the lead actors in That '70s Show, was entertained by, according to Scully. Battling Seizure Robots, the seizure-inducing television show that the Simpsons watch in their hotel room, is based on an episode of Pokémon, called "Dennō Senshi Porygon", which caused 685 children to develop epileptic seizures. According to Scully, the staff received "several angry letters" from people for the scene. After the cartoon, an advertisement for Mr. Sparkle, a character that first appeared in the season 8 episode "In Marge We Trust", can be seen on the television screen. Barney, while impersonating Homer, says "That boy ain't right", a line frequently used by Hank Hill, the main character of the animated television series King of the Hill. The giant monsters attacking at the end of the episode are Godzilla, Gamera, Rodan, and Mothra, all of which are famous from Japanese monster movies. The scene was included as a reference to the 1998 action science fiction film Godzilla, in which three of the main The Simpsons cast members (Azaria, Cartwright and Shearer) had a live-action role. In the Mexican dub of the episode, whilst The Simpsons family works through the fish-gutting factory, when witnessing the factory's jingle (and before flipping through TV stations with a well-placed eel) Homer directly references Dragon Ball Z.

== Release and reception ==
In its original American broadcast on May 16, 1999, "Thirty Minutes over Tokyo" received an 8.0 rating, according to Nielsen Media Research, translating to approximately 8 million viewers. On May 23, 2005, the episode was released along with the season 12 episode "Simpson Safari", the season 13 episode "Blame It on Lisa" and the season 15 episode "The Regina Monologues", as part of a DVD set called The Simpsons – Around The World In 80 D'Oh's. On August 7, 2007, the episode was again released as part of The Simpsons – The Complete Tenth Season DVD box set. Matt Groening, Mike Scully, Donick Cary, George Meyer, Ron Hauge, Matt Selman and Jim Reardon participated in the DVD's audio commentary of the episode.

The authors of the book I Can't Believe It's a Bigger and Better Updated Unofficial Simpsons Guide, Warren Martyn and Adrian Wood, gave the episode a positive review, and wrote that it was "A magnificent end to the season." They wrote that the episode was "thoroughly racist" but "completely inoffensive because it's simply very funny."

Jake MacNeill of Digital Entertainment News was also favorable, considering it to be one of the better episodes of the season.

James Plath of DVD Town wrote that the episode has "some funny moments."

Aaron Roxby of Collider was more critical, denouncing the episode's dated references. He wrote: "I am going to go ahead and give this one the benefit of the doubt and assume that making fun of Japanese junk culture and game shows felt fresher in 1999 than it does do now."

Colin Jacobson of DVD Movie Guide called the episode "mediocre". He wrote that, though the episode's concept should "open up lots of interesting possibilities", it "doesn't explore them particularly well". While he did not consider it to be a bad episode, he thought it "fail[ed] to live up to its potential".

== Censorship ==
"Thirty Minutes over Tokyo" is one of two episodes that never aired in Japan, China, Hong Kong and Taiwan (the other being season 11 episode "Little Big Mom"). The reasoning behind this was that a scene in the episode, which shows Homer throwing Japan's then-emperor Akihito into a box filled with sumo thongs, was considered disrespectful. There was also a rumor that Sanrio and Hello Kitty creator Yuko Shimizu were outraged by the inclusion of the Hello Kitty factory featured briefly in the episode. However, /Film reported in August 2024 that this rumor is unsubstantiated. The episode has become study material for sociology courses at University of California, Berkeley, where it is used to "examine issues of the production and reception of cultural objects, in this case, a satirical cartoon show", and to figure out what it is "trying to tell audiences about aspects primarily of American society, and, to a lesser extent, about other societies".

This episode was also originally banned in South Korea due to its policy on restricting Japanese culture on television at the time, following Japan's past colonization of Korea (1910–1945). The ban for the episode in South Korea was lifted sometime before 2007, when it was available to Koreans for the first time on the Season 10 DVD boxset. However, the episode remains banned in Japan, and has even been removed from Disney+ there.
