= Shane Bitney Crone =

American actor (born 1985)

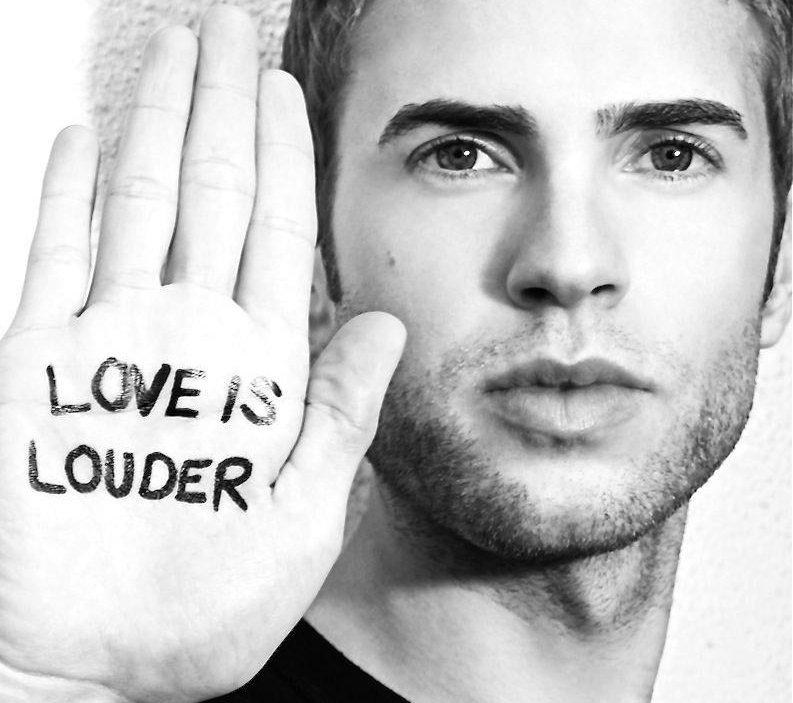
- Shane Bitney Crone "Love is Louder" Campaign Photo
- Born: December 19, 1985 (age 39); Kalispell, Montana, U.S.
- Occupation: Activist
- Partner(s): Tom Bridegroom (2005–2011, his death); Rayvon Owen (2015–2019)
- Parent(s): Cindy K. Bitney (mother); David L. Crone (father)

Shane Bitney Crone (born December 19, 1985) is an American filmmaker, writer, speaker, and advocate for LGBT rights.

== Early life ==
Crone was born in Kalispell, Montana. He moved to Los Angeles after high school graduation.

== Career ==
=== "It Could Happen to You" ===
Crone made headlines in May 2012 when he released a video on YouTube titled "It Could Happen to You," in which he spoke of the devastation he faced after the unexpected death of his longtime partner, Tom Bridegroom a year earlier. Bridegroom was an actor and songwriter who hosted the TV series The X Effect. While Crone's family was loving and accepting of his sexual orientation, Bridegroom's family was not, and had gone so far as to threaten Bridegroom with physical violence and to blame Crone for "making" their son gay. After Bridegroom accidentally fell to his death while photographing his friend on the roof of her four-story apartment building, Crone was threatened with physical violence if he attended Bridegroom's funeral and was not mentioned in Bridegroom's obituary or memorial service. Crone had also been denied hospital visitations and other rights accorded married couples because he was not recognized as Bridegroom's partner or as family.

Crone's plea for rights for same-sex couples became one of the most widely viewed clips on YouTube shortly after its release. Crone told RadarOnline.com that he made the video as a form of therapy to help him deal with his loss and to further positive change for same-sex couples in the United States.

=== Bridegroom ===
Bridegroom, a documentary directed by Linda Bloodworth-Thomason, based on the story of Crone's and Bridegroom's relationship and the difficulties Crone faced after his partner's death, premiered on April 23, 2013, at the Tribeca Film Festival. Former President Bill Clinton introduced the documentary at the Tribeca Film Festival, commenting, "This is really, on one level, a wonderful, sad, heartbreaking yet exhilarating and life-affirming story ... and on another level, it's a story about our nation's struggle to make one more step in forming a more perfect union, for which marriage is both the symbol and substance." Bridegroom won the Tribeca Film Festival Audience's non-fiction award.

== Personal life ==
On February 15, 2016, Crone announced that he was in a relationship with American Idol finalist Rayvon Owen. He appeared as the romantic lead in Owen's music video "Can't Fight It". They announced their engagement in 2018, after Crone proposed to Owen on stage at a Demi Lovato concert.
