= Blue Collar Comedy Tour: The Movie =

- Theatrical release poster
- Directed by: C.B. Harding
- Starring: Jeff Foxworthy; Bill Engvall; Larry the Cable Guy; Ron White; David Alan Grier
- Cinematography: Bruce Finn
- Edited by: Tony Hayman
- Production company: Gaylord Films
- Distributed by: Warner Bros. Pictures
- Release date: March 28, 2003
- Running time: 106 minutes
- Country: United States
- Language: English
- Budget: $2 million
- Box office: $604,856

Blue Collar Comedy Tour: The Movie is a 2003 American stand-up comedy concert film from Warner Bros. Pictures. It stars comedians Jeff Foxworthy and Bill Engvall and fellow Blue Collar comics Ron White and Larry the Cable Guy. The movie is similar in nature to that of The Original Kings of Comedy. It was followed by two direct-to-video sequels, Blue Collar Comedy Tour Rides Again (2004) and Blue Collar Comedy Tour: One for the Road (2006). The film received critical acclaim.

== Premise ==
The film features live stand-up performances filmed at the Dodge Theater in Phoenix, Arizona on July 21, 2002. It also features behind-the-scenes segments highlighting the individual comedians.

== Television broadcast ==
When aired on Comedy Central, in addition to editing of the stand-up material for time and content, Heidi Klum's appearance is completely cut out.

== Filming locations ==
- Dodge Theater in Phoenix, Arizona
- Scottsdale, Arizona
- Scottsdale Fashion Square -7014 East Camelback Road (mall scenes)
- Phoenix, Arizona PARK N' SWAP
- Mesa, Arizona FIESTA MALL

== Soundtrack ==
1. "Don't Ask Me No Questions", Chris Cagle
2. "Act Naturally", Leon Russell
3. "Sharp Dressed Man", Brad Paisley
4. "Boogie Chillen'", John Lee Hooker
5. "Venom Wearin' Denim", Junior Brown

== Reception ==
The film has received near-universal critical acclaim, praising the irreverent jokes and humor. On the review aggregator website Rotten Tomatoes, 92% of 13 critics' reviews are positive, with an average rating of 6.8/10. Metacritic, which uses a weighted average, assigned the film a score of 70 out of 100, based on 6 critics, indicating "generally favorable" reviews.
