= You Can't Fix Stupid =

Studio album by Ron White
- Released: February 7, 2006
- Genre: Comedy
- Label: Image Entertainment
- Producer: Michael Drumm

Ron White chronology
Drunk in Public (2003)	You Can't Fix Stupid (2006)	Behavioral Problems (2009)

Professional ratings
Review scores
Source	Rating
Allmusic	4/5 stars

You Can't Fix Stupid is an album by American comedian Ron White. It was released by Image Entertainment on February 7, 2006. The album peaked at number 1 on the Billboard Top Comedy Albums chart.

== Track listing ==
1. "Intro" – 0:52
2. "Seeing Old Friends" – 0:18
3. "Landscraper" – 1:40
4. "Touring on the Bus" – 1:10
5. "Cheesewheel" – 1:00
6. "Michael Jackson" – 1:54
7. "Petticoat Junction" – 1:16
8. "Ft. Polk" – 1:03
9. "The Globe" – 0:52
10. "A Flipper" – 1:32
11. "Bachelorette Party" – 4:08
12. "Refill" – 0:46
13. "You Can't Fix Stupid" – 2:21
14. "Squirrel Man" – 12:28
15. "Chocolate" – 1:16
16. "Highway Delight" – 0:47
17. "Mile High Club" – 1:07
18. "Work Ethic" – 0:27
19. "High School" – 1:14
20. "Grandma in Texas" – 3:56
21. "Cousin Ray" – 4:10

== Charts ==
=== Weekly charts ===
Chart (2006)	Peak position
US Billboard 200	14
US Top Comedy Albums (Billboard)	1
US Top Country Albums (Billboard)	2

=== Year-end charts ===
Chart (2006)	Position
US Top Comedy Albums (Billboard)	2
US Top Country Albums (Billboard)	46
Chart (2007)	Position
US Top Comedy Albums (Billboard)	13
