= Margo Rey =

Mexican singer-songwriter (born 1966)

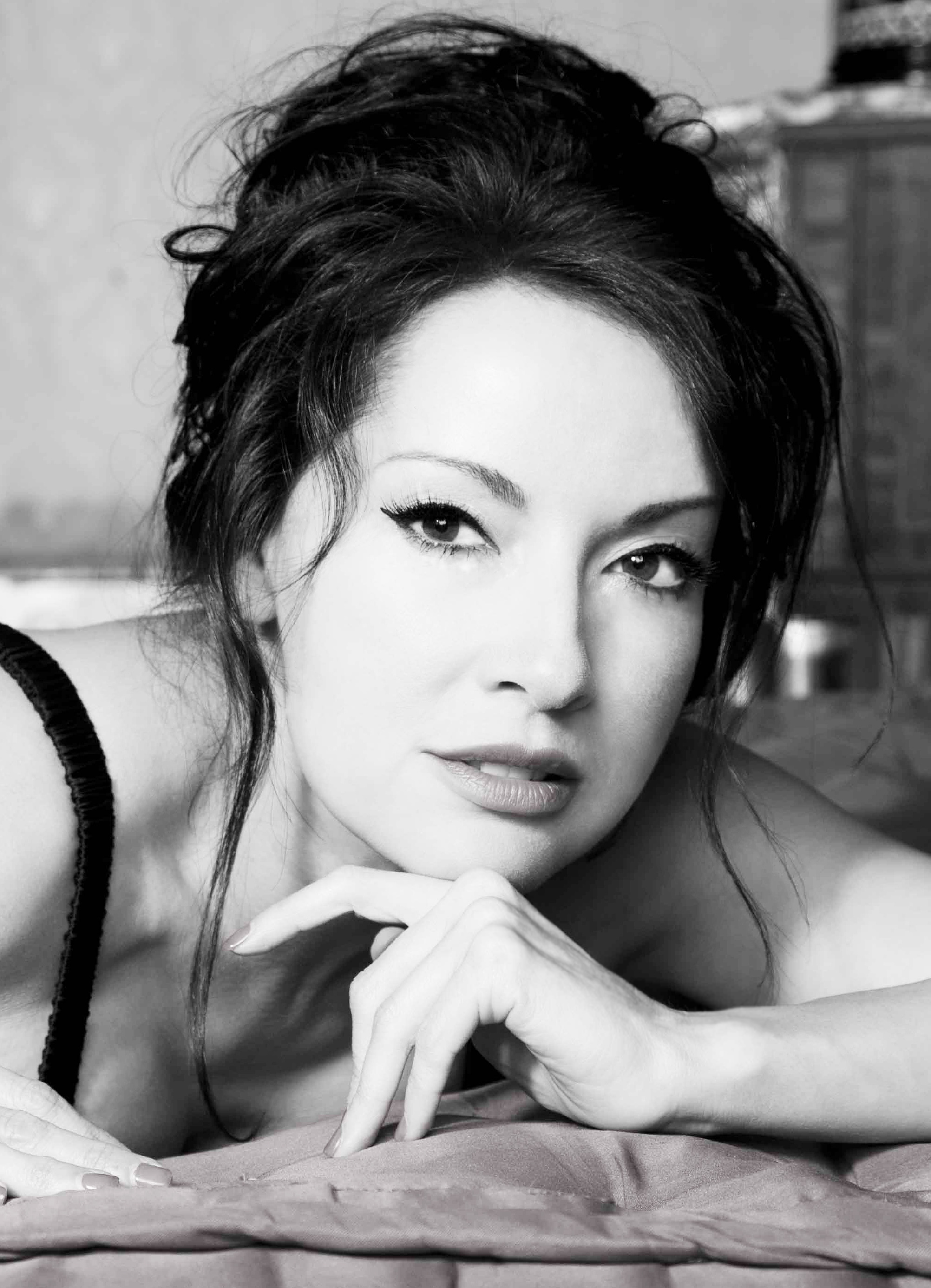
- Rey's photo shoot with Mauricio Velez in Bogotá, Colombia

Background information
- Birth name: Margarita Reymundo-Jurado
- Also known as: Margo Reymundo
- Born: 18 October 1966 (age 58) Acapulco, Mexico
- Genres: Pop, jazz, bossa nova
- Occupation(s): Singer-songwriter, musician
- Instrument: Vocals
- Years active: 1990–present
- Labels: Organica Music Group
- Spouse: Ron White (m. 2013; div. 2017)
- Website: margorey.com

Margo Rey (born Margarita Reymundo-Jurado; 18 October 1966) is a Mexican singer-songwriter whose original stage name was Margo Reymundo.

== Early life ==
Rey was born in Acapulco, Mexico but grew up in Arlington and Dallas, Texas, the youngest of five children in the family. Her mother, Juana-Amparo Jurado, was a Flamenco dancer, and her father, Alejandro Reymundo, was a cliff diver. When Rey was two, the family moved to Fort Worth, Texas. She began performing at the age of 11.

== Career ==
=== Early years ===
In Texas, Rey took classical music training. As a teenager, Rey was the lead vocalist in Debutante, an all-female rock band in Arlington. The band toured the U.S. and overseas. In 1988, Debutante self-released an album, These Boots Were Made For Walkin'. In the early 1990s, Rey began singing in The Ritual, a power-pop band. The band garnered interest from Columbia Records, but on the verge of signing, they broke up. Rey was then hired by a Dallas venue, Sambuca. She became the bandleader of a Latin Jazz/R&B sextet called Miss Margo & The Lost Souls.

The group's debut album, Acaba, had one top-five and two top-twenty singles, according to Radio y Musica magazine. The album's success landed Rey a major record deal in 1997 with PolyGram Latino. Due to corporate consolidation, Rey found herself in label limbo and for three years her album wasn't released but neither could she exit her deal.

=== Musical theater and voiceover work ===
In 1998, actor Edward James Olmos heard Rey sing and recommended her for a principal role in the bound-for-Broadway musical Selena Forever. This launched a career in musical theatre in New York.

Rey moved to Los Angeles to make music while working as an actress. She was signed by Abrams Artist Agency. She has been a commercial vocalist for Juniper Music and has done voiceover work in TV commercials and national advertising for a variety of companies in both English and Spanish.

=== Musical style ===
Rey calls her style of music "Organica", an unorthodox hybrid of pop music that is rooted in jazz with deep ethno-rhythmic grooves, textural guitars, keys and lush vocals. In 2009, she released her album My Heart's Desire and appeared as a guest on the Dr. Phil show, where she performed Between Us. The album received the 2009 Muse's Muse award for Best Overall CD Project in Any Category.

Rey's music caught the attention of comedian Ron White and music producer Michael Blakey, a former president of Virgin Records/2K Records. Blakey and White formed Organica Music Group and made Rey their first signing.

A year later, Organica launched Rey's original dance single EP called Habit (Remixes), which debuted at No. 7 and climbed its way to No. 1 for two straight weeks. Habit also stayed on the Billboard Hot Dance Club Songs Chart for nine weeks.

At the end of 2011, Rey's song "Let The Rain", which she co-wrote with John Oates, remained on the charts for 21 weeks, peaking at No. 17 on Billboard magazine's Adult Contemporary chart. The track was named a "Hot Shot Debut" on the Billboard Adult Contemporary chart. The following radio single, "Between Us," climbed to No. 21 on the Billboard AC Chart in August 2012.

In 2011, Rey released a Christmas EP, This Holiday Night, which appeared in the Top 20 of the Billboard Adult Contemporary charts. The title song was written by Rey and Barrett Yeretsian.

=== 2012–present ===
Rey's album Habit, released in July 2012 by Organica Music Group, was produced by Rey, Elton Ahi, and Chris Wabich. "Habit" was recorded and mixed at Rusk LA by Ahi and mastered by Yossi Shaken.

The single Tempted, a cover of Squeeze's 1980s track, charted at No. 28 on the National AC Airplay Chart on Billboard, the week of 26 May 2013.

Margo is also the voice actress of Muerta, a hero in the Valve videogame Dota 2. Muerta was added to the game's hero roster on March 6, 2023.

In 2025, Margo guest starred in the Disney Channel animated series Primos as the voice of Tia Rita.

== Live performances ==
Rey was a resident at the B. B. King's Blues Club in 2011 and 2012. Together with White and her band, Rey put on numerous shows entitled Ron White Presents: Margo Rey Live, hosted by White, and with guest appearances that included John Oates.

At the end of 2012, Rey accompanied saxophonist Dave Koz as a guest singer on his "Dave Koz and Friends Christmas Tour 2012" tour between Thanksgiving and Christmas.

== Discography ==
=== Albums ===
- 2008: My Heart's Desire
- 2010: Get Back (Remixes)
- 2012: Habit

=== EPs ===
- 2010: Habit (Remixes)
- 2011: This Holiday Night

=== Singles ===
- 2010: "You Belong to Me"
- 2011: Let The Rain (featuring John Oates)
- 2012: Between Us
- 2013: Tempted

=== Charting ===
Title	Year	Peak chart positions	
Title	Year	US AC	US Hot Dance Club Songs
"Habit"	2010	—	28
"Get Back"	2011	—	35
"Let the Rain" (featuring John Oates)	2011	17	—
"This Holiday Night"	2011	18	—
"Between Us"	2012	21	—
"Tempted"	2013	17	—
"—" denotes release that has not charted.

== Philanthropy ==
Rey is a metastatic breast cancer survivor. She performed at the Beverly Wilshire Hotel at a one-night event benefiting the Noreen Fraser Foundation, a non-profit organization that raises funds for women's cancer research.

== Personal life ==
Rey's brother is comedian Alex Reymundo. From 2013 to 2017, Rey was married to comedian Ron White, with whom Rey's brother tours as White's opening act.
