= Blue Collar Comedy Tour =

American comedy troupe

Comedy career
- Years active: 2000–2006
- Medium: Television; film; stand-up; audio recordings; books
- Genres: Satire; observational; word play
- Members: Jeff Foxworthy; Bill Engvall; Ron White; Larry the Cable Guy

The Blue Collar Comedy Tour was an American comedy troupe, featuring Jeff Foxworthy with three of his comedian friends, Bill Engvall, Ron White, and Larry the Cable Guy, who had replaced fellow comedian Craig Hawksley, who performed in the first 26 shows on the tour. The troupe toured together for six years beginning in January 2000 in Omaha, before finishing in 2006 at the Warner Theatre in Washington, D.C. The troupe also created the CMT show Bounty Hunters.

== Origin ==
Jeff Foxworthy had already established himself as a well known, Grammy Award-winning comedian, best known for his jokes and stories about life as a redneck. According to Foxworthy, he got inspired to make the tour when he read a review for the movie The Original Kings of Comedy, and noting that the review considered the movie appealing to more of an "urban, hip" audience, which Foxworthy felt left out his usual demographic of rural audiences. Foxworthy had cast best friend Engvall in the NBC version of The Jeff Foxworthy Show, White was brought on as his comedy is based around personal experiences retold in his smoking, drinking Southern United States persona, as well as being a former opener for Foxworthy. According to White, when he was presented with the original tour concept, he admitted that he thought the idea "was retarded." Originally, Craig Hawksley was the fourth member of the tour, but after the original tour, was uncomfortable about performing in front of large audiences and chose to leave the tour. Foxworthy then asked Larry, who he had featured on his nationally syndicated, weekly, country radio show The Foxworthy Countdown, to join.

Each show initially featured White and Larry each doing 15-minute sets, followed by Engvall and Foxworthy each doing 30-minute sets, then the four comedians would gather together, sitting on stools on stage, doing varying comedy routines and jokes (such as Engvall's "Here's Your Sign" jokes and Foxworthy's "You Might Be A Redneck" routine) to close the show. Foxworthy, due to his high popularity at the time, was always the last performer. By 2004, with Larry's popularity growing, the order was shifted to Engvall, followed by White, followed by Foxworthy, then Larry, though now all of the comedians had more equal length sets.

== Recordings ==
The tour that featured these four "good ole boys" proved to be such a hit that they recorded a live album in November 2001 and the first DVD called Blue Collar Comedy Tour: The Movie in the spring of 2003. The movie underperformed at the box office, but gained high ratings when aired on Comedy Central.

After the success of the tour, album and live DVD, the comedians recorded a second live DVD called Blue Collar Comedy Tour Rides Again and a series on The WB called Blue Collar TV. Ron White was on the second DVD, and although he was not a regular on the TV show, he did make guest appearances. A third Blue Collar movie was produced for Comedy Central titled Blue Collar Comedy Tour: One for the Road, which premiered on the channel in June 2006. Blue Collar Comedy Tour: One for The Road was released on DVD in June 2006.

=== Films ===
- Blue Collar Comedy Tour: The Movie (2003)
- Blue Collar Comedy Tour Rides Again (2004)
- Blue Collar Comedy Tour: One for the Road (2006)

== Satellite radio ==
In March 2006, the group started a Blue Collar Comedy channel on Sirius Satellite Radio titled Blue Collar Radio. The station features not only various stand-up acts from the four members but various acts from other working class-esque comedians such as Brian Regan, Rodney Carrington, Kathleen Madigan, John Caponera, Rodney Dangerfield, Ray Romano, and others as well. When Sirius Satellite Radio merged with XM Satellite Radio, this brought more coverage of the channel.

Now known as Jeff & Larry's Comedy Roundup, it can be heard on SiriusXM 97.

== Them Idiots Whirled Tour ==
As of 2011, Foxworthy, Engvall and Larry still do comedy tours together under the title Them Idiots Whirled Tour. This is keeping true to their claim that One for the Road was the last Blue Collar tour, thus respecting the fact that Ron White is not part of it. A CD and DVD of the new show from the Consol Energy Center in Pittsburgh, Pennsylvania was released on March 13, 2012.

== See also ==
- Blue Collar TV
- The Original Kings of Comedy
- The Comedians of Comedy
