= Blue Collar Comedy Tour Rides Again =

- DVD cover
- Directed by: C.B. Harding
- Starring: Jeff Foxworthy; Bill Engvall; Larry the Cable Guy; Ron White; PJ Walsh (announcer)
- Country of origin: United States
- Original language: English

Production
- Running time: 106 minutes
- Budget: $2.5 million

Original release
- Release: December 5, 2004

Blue Collar Comedy Tour Rides Again is a 2004 American comedy film directed by C.B. Harding and starring Jeff Foxworthy, Bill Engvall, Larry the Cable Guy, Ron White, and PJ Walsh. It is a direct-to-video sequel to the film Blue Collar Comedy Tour: The Movie.

The DVD was a surprise success for Paramount Home Entertainment, which by April 2005 reported sales of 2.5 million units. The soundtrack for Blue Collar Comedy Tour Rides Again peaked at No. 10 on the Billboard Top Country Music Chart in December 2004.

== Plot ==
The Blue Collar guys have reunited for their second tour. This show was filmed at the Temple Hoyne Buell Theatre, in the Denver Center for the Performing Arts.

Bill Engvall was up first. His routine consisted of a whale-watching adventure in California with a couple of surfers, a hunting trip with his wife that went terribly wrong, and his critically acclaimed "Here's Your Sign" jokes.

Ron White, with his usual scotch on the rocks and cigar, took the stage next. His routine featured stories about his recent marriage to his second wife, an argument with a random bystander about Garth Brooks, and some material about the dogs that he owns, particularly his bulldog Sluggo.

Jeff Foxworthy came on to the stage after White. He gave his opinions of side effects in prescription medicines, shared similarities he noticed between straight men and gay men, as well as similarities between teenagers and senior citizens, with each portion involving a story about his redneck family.

Larry the Cable Guy came out to a rousing ovation from the audience. He delivered a routine which consisted of "family stories" and his many past relationships with various women.

After Larry finished his set, all the guys came out to close out the show. At first, they talked about how blessed they felt to do what they do, and with that, recalled the last jobs they had (or considered doing) before becoming comedians and eventually touring together. Then, Larry pulled out a guitar, and the guys performed the song "I Believe" to the enthusiastic Denver crowd.
