= Ron White =

American comedian (born 1956)

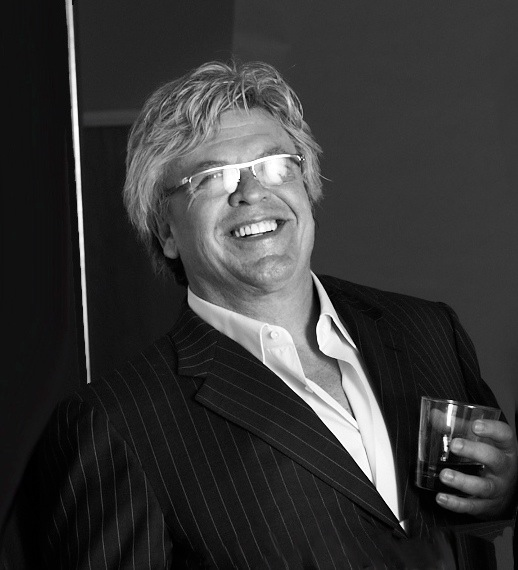
- White in 2010
- Born: December 18, 1956 (age 69); Fritch, Texas, U.S.
- Spouses: Lori Brice (m. 1981; div. 1993) Barbara Dobbs (m. 2004; div. 2008) Margo Rey (m. 2013; div. 2017)
- Children: 1

Comedy career
- Years active: 1978–present
- Medium: Stand-up
- Genres: Country comedy, observational comedy, satire, blue comedy
- Website: www.tatersalad.com

Ronald Dee White (born December 18, 1956) is an American stand-up comedian, actor and author, best known as a charter member of the Blue Collar Comedy Tour. Nicknamed "Tater Salad", he is the author of the book I Had the Right to Remain Silent But I Didn't Have the Ability, which appeared on the New York Times Best Seller list.

== Biography ==
White was born in Fritch, Texas on December 18, 1956. He joined the U.S. Navy at age 17 and served on the auxiliary rescue and salvage ship USS Conserver near the end of the Vietnam War. Before pursuing comedy professionally, White briefly lived in Mexico, where he bought a pottery factory.

During the early 2000s, White toured with Jeff Foxworthy, Bill Engvall, and Larry the Cable Guy as part of the Blue Collar Comedy Tour – a show that sold out across the United States in over 90 cities and grossed over $15 million. It also launched three films and a satellite radio show. He made seven guest appearances on the television show, Blue Collar TV.

In 2005, The WB Television Network aired the pilot for The Ron White Show, a variety show that combined a number of celebrity cameos, cartoons, and sketches. He taped several episodes of The Gong Show with Dave Attell as one of the celebrity judges. White has appeared in the TV shows Kath & Kim, Reno 911!, 12 Miles of Bad Road, the films Sex and the City 2 and Horrible Bosses, and a cameo in a Rascal Flatts music video, "Why Wait". He was one of the executive producers of the 2013 documentary Bridegroom.

White was known for drinking Scotch as part of his act, as well as smoking cigars or cigarettes. He stated during his You Can't Fix Stupid show, "Somebody asked what I was drinking. If the company that made the stuff I was drinking was paying me, I'd have it in their bottle and not mine. But it's the kind of scotch that people drink that are going to die penniless. It's good though!" In 2009, Comedy Central released White's stand up DVD Behavioral Problems.

In 2010, Ron White and producer Michael Blakey formed Organica Music Group (OMG), a label that promotes both emerging and established musicians and comedians. OMG indicated that it would release all of White's future DVDs and CDs. In November 2015, White announced that he was running for President of the United States as an independent candidate in 2016. In 2016, White starred as Phil, veteran road manager for the fictional Staton-House Band, in the Showtime series Roadies.

In January 2020 White announced plans to retire from stand-up at the end of the year, with his last show on New Year's Eve 2020, the conclusion of his slated nationwide tour. He said he planned to retire in Texas. However the COVID-19 pandemic interrupted his touring schedule for 15 months. White's return to stand-up began in Florida, one of the only states open at the time, where he worked 25-minute shows. When White returned to touring full-time in September 2021 he planned to continue his final tour and retire in the fall 2022. However White continues to tour with dates extending into 2025.

In 2025, White played fictional NASCAR driver Ron Dobbins on the Netflix comedy series Tires.

== Personal life ==
White was married to Lori Brice from 1981 to 1993 and they had one son, Marshall. He was later married to Barbara Dobbs from 2004 to 2008. In 2013, he married singer Margo Rey; as of 2017 the two are no longer together, with White claiming that they were never legally married. On August 6, 2019, a ruling came down in L.A. Superior Court where a judge sided with Rey and declared the couple was in a common-law marriage under Texas law.

White stopped drinking alcohol in early 2021. He credits the consultation of a hypnotherapist and the use of ayahuasca with his abstinence.

== Awards and recognition ==
White received the Armed Forces Foundation's "Patriot Award" in March 2009 for his work in raising money to help wounded soldiers. April 27, 2009, was designated "Ron White Day" in the State of Texas by Texas legislative officials. He also held benefit shows for Hurricane Katrina relief. He was Grammy-nominated for Best Comedy Album in 2007 (shared with Jeff Foxworthy, Bill Engvall, and Larry the Cable Guy), and again in 2014.

== Comedy releases ==
Besides the Blue Collar Comedy Tour CDs and films, White has released seven solo projects to date.

=== Solo works ===
- Tater Salad a.k.a. Busted in Des Moines (1990) (CD)
- Drunk in Public (2003) (CD)
- They Call Me "Tater Salad" (2004) (DVD)
- You Can't Fix Stupid (2006) (DVD and CD)
- Behavioral Problems (2009) (DVD)
- A Little Unprofessional (2013) (DVD and digital download)
- If You Quit Listening, I'll Shut Up (2018) (Netflix)

He has appeared on the following compilation albums:

- Blue Collar Comedy Tour: The Movie (2003) (DVD)
- Ron White, Jeff Foxworthy & Bill Engvall: Live from Las Vegas (2004)
- Blue Collar Comedy Tour Rides Again (2004) (DVD)
- Redneck Comedy Roundup (2005)
- Redneck Kings of Comedy (2005)
- Comedy Central Presents Southern Gents of Comedy (2006)
- Blue Collar Comedy Tour: One For The Road (2006)(DVD)

== Discography ==
| Title | Album details | Peak chart positions | | | | Certifications (sales threshold) |
| Title | Album details | US Comedy | US Country | US | US Heat | Certifications (sales threshold) |
|---|---|---|---|---|---|---|
| Tater Salad a.k.a. Busted in Des Moines | Release date: 1990; Label: Laughing Hyena | — | — | — | — | |
| Truckstop Comedy | Release date: 1994; Label: Laughing Hyena | — | — | — | — | |
| Drunk in Public | Release date: November 3, 2003; Label: Hip-O Records | 2 | 11 | 83 | 2 | US: Gold |
| You Can't Fix Stupid | Release date: February 7, 2006; Label: Image Entertainment | 1 | 2 | 14 | — | |
| Behavioral Problems | Release date: April 21, 2009; Label: Capitol Records | 1 | 13 | 51 | — | |
| A Little Unprofessional | Release date: June 4, 2013; Label: Organica Music Group | 1 | 44 | — | — | |

"—" denotes releases that did not chart

== Book ==
- White, Ron (2006). I Had the Right to Remain Silent...But I Didn't Have the Ability. Dutton Adult. ISBN 9780525949619.
