= Havana Wild Weekend =

- The Simpsons episode
- Episode no.: Season 28; Episode 7
- Directed by: Bob Anderson
- Written by: Deb Lacusta; Dan Castellaneta; Peter Tilden
- Production code: VABF19
- Original air date: November 13, 2016

Guest appearances
- Stacy Keach as H.K. Duff; Deb Lacusta as Isabella

Episode features
- Chalkboard gag: "Being right sucks"
- Couch gag: The family flies to the couch on top of Mount Olympus, but Lisa is missing. She comes out of Homer's head, and Homer steals Maggie's pacifier to close the hole in his head.

Episode chronology
← Previous "There Will Be Buds"	Next → "Dad Behavior"
- The Simpsons season 28

"Havana Wild Weekend" is the seventh episode of the twenty-eighth season of the American animated television series The Simpsons, and the 603rd episode of the series overall. The episode was directed by Bob Anderson and written by Deb Lacusta, Dan Castellaneta, and Peter Tilden. It aired in the United States on Fox on November 13, 2016.

In this episode, the Simpson family goes to Cuba to get Grampa medical care where he meets an old friend and becomes infatuated with a bar matron. Stacy Keach and Deb Lacusta guest starred. The episode received mixed reviews.

== Plot ==
When Grampa accidentally urinates on the carpet, the Simpsons try to get him medical help but find the nursing home has no resources or personnel at all, and the Veterans Administration tells Abe they can't see him for an appointment for 23 years. On the advice of another elderly ex-soldier, the family goes to Havana, Cuba to get Grampa cheap medical care. As they arrive there a friendly doctor sadly says there is nothing that can be done to help Abe, but the sights of cars and music from the 1950s leads to him feeling much healthier.

While the family enjoys the sights of Havana, including Homer making a drinking game out of old speeches by Fidel Castro, Grampa meets a bar matron, Isabella, whom he fancies. He also runs into an old friend of his, a pilot who was thrown out of the Air Force for nearly detonating an atomic bomb by accident and stayed in Cuba after hijacking a plane and diverting it to there in the 1970s. He brings Grampa to a plane hidden in the jungle which he turned into a secret nightclub, where such nefarious types as drug lords and the founder of Ticketmaster (who is the only person everyone immediately punches in the face) are enjoying their exiles. Seeing how much fun life is there Grampa decides he wants to stay in Cuba. The Simpsons family tries to talk him out it. As they all board the plane it turns out that Isabella is a C.I.A. agent who tries to search for and arrest American refugees and transport them back to the U.S., and while she only used Grandpa as bait to successfully nab a wide variety of fugitives and he's not in any trouble, he's still left depressed over her leaving him and him having to leave Cuba forever. Thus, Grampa and the family are brought back home but Grampa does retain some better feelings when he's back in the U.S.

== Production ==
This is the first episode co-written by Peter Tilden, who wrote the episode with series regular Dan Castellaneta and his wife Deb Lacusta. Lacusta also guest starred as Isabella. Stacy Keach reprised his role as H.K. Duff from previous episodes.

The chalkboard gag in this episode is a response to the unexpected victory of Donald Trump in the 2016 presidential election. The season eleven episode "Bart to the Future", an episode set in the future, refers to a previous Trump presidency. That episode aired after Trump announced his unsuccessful 2000 bid for President as a Reform Party candidate.

This was the last aired episode of the series to be animated by Film Roman.

== Reception ==
Tony Sokol of Den of Geek gave a positive review of the episode, giving it a 4/5, adding, "'Havana Wild Weekend' is a fun episode in what is shaping up to be a far better than average season. The jokes come fast, there are a few great setups and the locations are great. The Simpsons have visited almost-countless countries in their time. (We recently went over a partial list a few weeks ago when they visited Boston, but still refuse to count). There, as here, well, not here but in Cuba, the Simpsons fall in love with the locations and are far more respectful than they have been in the past."

Dennis Perkins of The A.V. Club gave the episode a C+ stating, "in the long and storied history of Simpsons travelogues, 'Havana Wild Weekend' is as sure to be forgotten as is poor old Abe."

Andrew S. Vargas of Remezcla thought the episode accurately depicted the details of Cuban culture and behavior without resorting to clichés.

"Havana Wild Weekend" scored a 3.1 rating and was watched by 7.13 million people, making it Fox's highest rated show of the night.
