= I Am Not Homer =

Studio album by Dan Castellaneta
- Released: 23 April 2002
- Genre: Comedy
- Label: Oglio

Dan Castellaneta chronology
Two Lips (2000)	I Am Not Homer (2002)

I Am Not Homer is a 2002 comedy album by actor and comedian Dan Castellaneta, with additional input by his wife Deb Lacusta. The album is a collection of comedy sketches written and performed by Castellaneta and Lacusta, and was the follow-up to Castellaneta's previous all-music album Two Lips. The title and cover art of the album are references to Leonard Nimoy's first autobiography, I Am Not Spock. A majority of the sketches were material that the pair had used before in their careers, but no longer performed live.

== Production ==
A majority of the sketches had been written and performed before the CD was recorded, and Castellaneta thought that it would be a good idea to preserve them "since [he and Lacusta] don't perform them much anymore." Some came from their sketch series on a local radio station in Chicago and had to be lengthened from the "two-minute bits" that they were originally, while several others were stage sketches performed in a comedy club in Santa Monica. Additionally, "Citizen Kane", a sketch in which two people discuss the film Citizen Kane with different meanings, was something the pair had performed at an art gallery. Castellaneta noted that "we already knew that these skits were funny, [but] some of them we polished and tightened." The skits were principally written by improvising from a basic point, transcribing the results and then editing them to the finished scene.

Castellaneta chose the title I Am Not Homer as a parody of Leonard Nimoy's famous first autobiography I Am Not Spock, as well as to show that most of the comedy featured "is not the typical Homer comedy." It was also a reference to the fact that many people do not know anything about Castellaneta's comedy career away from The Simpsons.

== Reception ==
Canadian writer, Jenny Yuen, gave the CD a mixed review, noting "some funny moments", but "the sketches barely match annoying bickering one could listen to on an episode of All in the Family". She did, however, praise the final track, "So Dumb", which features Castellaneta singing a song as his main characters from The Simpsons: Homer, Krusty the Clown, Abraham Simpson, Barney Gumble and Groundskeeper Willie. Bradley Torreano found that there are "a few very funny sketches, but in the long run this is a very average comedy album that only inspires the occasional chuckle".

== Track listing ==
All skits are performed by Castellaneta and Lacusta, except for "So Dumb" which is a solo monologue performed by Castellaneta.

1. "AM Therapy" – 8:04
2. "Badger Baseball" – 5:00
3. "Elvus" – 5:28
4. "Rocks Off" – 6:48
5. "Horoscope" – 2:16
6. "Dynamite Sales" – 8:14
7. "Drive Time" – 10:19
8. "Citizen Kane" – 4:54
9. "So Dumb (Homer's Lament)" – 7:20
