= 22 Short Films About Springfield =

- The Simpsons episode
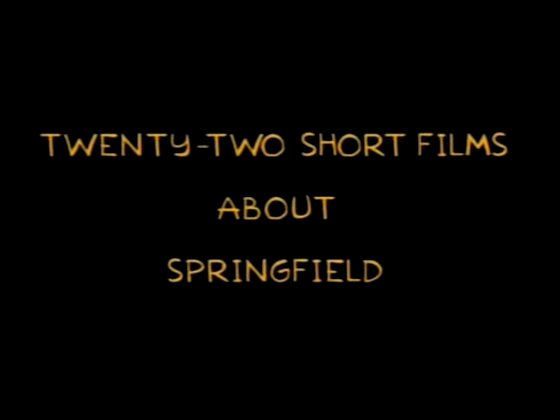
- Title card
- Episode no.: Season 7 Episode 21
- Directed by: Jim Reardon
- Written by: Richard Appel; David X. Cohen; Jonathan Collier; Jennifer Crittenden; Greg Daniels; Brent Forrester; Dan Greaney; Matt Groening; Rachel Pulido; Bill Oakley; Steve Tompkins; Josh Weinstein
- Production code: 3F18
- Original air date: April 14, 1996

Guest appearances
- Phil Hartman as Lionel Hutz and the hospital board chairman

Episode features
- Couch gag: The Simpsons are Sea-Monkeys who swim to a couch made of clam shells to stare at an open treasure chest.
- Commentary: Matt Groening; Bill Oakley; Josh Weinstein; Richard Appel; David X. Cohen; Rachel Pulido; Yeardley Smith; Jim Reardon; David Silverman

Episode chronology
← Previous "Bart on the Road"	Next → "Raging Abe Simpson and His Grumbling Grandson in 'The Curse of the Flying Hellfish'"
- The Simpsons season 7

"22 Short Films About Springfield" is the twenty-first episode of the seventh season of the American animated television series The Simpsons. It originally aired on the Fox Network in the United States on April 14, 1996. It was written by Richard Appel, David X. Cohen, Jonathan Collier, Jennifer Crittenden, Greg Daniels, Brent Forrester, Dan Greaney, Matt Groening, Rachel Pulido, Bill Oakley, Steve Tompkins, and Josh Weinstein, with the writing being supervised by Daniels. The episode was directed by Jim Reardon. Phil Hartman guest-starred as Lionel Hutz and the hospital board chairman.

The episode depicts brief incidents experienced by a wide array of Springfield residents in a series of interconnected stories that take place over a single day. The episode's concept originated from the end segment of the season four episode "The Front", which gave the staff the idea of a possible spin-off from The Simpsons, and serves as a loose parody of Pulp Fiction. The title is a reference to the 1993 film Thirty Two Short Films About Glenn Gould.

The episode received positive reviews from critics, and is noted for its popularity among fans, with the "Steamed Hams" segment becoming a popular Internet meme in 2016.

== Plot ==
The episode is a series of shorts ranging in length from under half a minute to over two and a half minutes, each showing daily life in Springfield, after Bart wonders if anything interesting happens to the town's citizens.

1. Bart and Milhouse spit and squirt condiments from a highway overpass onto cars, then go to the Kwik-E-Mart.
2. Apu closes the Kwik-E-Mart for five minutes to attend a party at Sanjay's house, trapping Moleman in the store.
3. Bart unknowingly throws gum in Lisa's hair, and Marge tries to remove the gum by putting peanut butter and mayonnaise on her hair. Lisa's hair attracts a swarm of bees, one of which flies away.
4. While bike riding with Mr. Burns, Smithers suffers an allergic reaction to the bee's sting and rides to the hospital, but the orderlies admit only Burns.
5. Dr. Nick is criticized by the hospital board for his unorthodox medical procedures, only to treat Grampa with an electric light socket, saving his career.
6. Moe gets robbed by Snake after Barney gives Moe $2,000 to pay for a portion of his $14 billion bar tab.
7. While hosting Superintendent Chalmers for lunch, Principal Skinner burns his roast and bluffs his way through the meal, replacing the roast with hamburgers from Krusty Burger and dubbing them "steamed hams", setting his house on fire in the process.
8. Homer accidentally traps Maggie in a newspaper vending box while trying to get a paper with full hands and is unable to get help as he can't leave Maggie alone. After several unsuccessful attempts to free her, he uproots the box and takes it home with her still inside.
9. Chief Wiggum, Lou, and Eddie compare McDonald's and Krusty Burger.
10. Bumblebee Man arrives home after a horrible day at work and suffers a string of humorous disasters, causing his house to collapse and his wife to serve him with divorce papers.
11. Snake runs Wiggum over, and their ensuing fight ends with Herman capturing them at gunpoint in his store.
12. Reverend Lovejoy urges his Old English Sheepdog to relieve himself on Ned Flanders's lawn.
13. Various townspeople advise Marge and Lisa how to remove the gum stuck in Lisa's hair.
14. Cletus offers Brandine some shoes he found on a telephone line.
15. Milhouse desperately needs to pee and asks Comic Book Guy at the Android's Dungeon if he could use the bathroom, but can only use it if he buys something, and his father forces him to leave the store before he can use it. They go to use the bathroom in Hermann's store in which Hermann allows, and Hermann is reluctant to take Kirk hostage as he did Snake and Wiggum, but Milhouse accidentally knocks out Hermann with a flail, invertedly saving all three.
16. Jake the barber cuts the gum out of Lisa's hair, leaving her with a different hairstyle.
17. Nelson laughs at Lisa's new haircut, at Mrs. Glick who experienced her own misfortune, and at Ian, an extremely tall man in a small Volkswagen Beetle, the latter of whom publicly humiliates Nelson to teach him a lesson, by pantsing him and forcing Nelson to parade down the main street with onlookers on the sidewalk while Ian followed behind Nelson in his car.
18. Bart and Milhouse squirt ketchup and mustard onto Nelson from the overpass, and conclude that life is interesting in their town after all.
19. Professor Frink attempts to tell his story but is cut off by the ending credits.

== Production ==
The episode's principal idea came from the season four episode "The Front", which contained a short sequence entitled The Adventures of Ned Flanders, featuring its own title card and theme song, at its conclusion. The scene has no relevance to the main plot of the episode and was designed solely as filler to accommodate the episode's short runtime. The staff loved the concept and attempted to fit similar scenes into other episodes, but none were short enough to require one. Show runners Bill Oakley and Josh Weinstein decided to make an entire episode of linked short scenes involving many of the show's characters, similar to Quentin Tarantino's Pulp Fiction. The title "22 Short Films About Springfield" was decided upon from the start of the episode's production even though there are not actually twenty-two stories in it, due to the standard 22-minute length of an episode. Originally there were more scenes, but several of them had to be cut out for time. To decide who would write each of the segments, all the writers chose their top three favorite characters and put them into a hat, the names were drawn out, and the writers were assigned their parts. Oakley wrote the Superintendent Chalmers story, Weinstein did the Comic Book Guy and Milhouse scene, David Cohen penned the Reverend Lovejoy sketch, as well as the deleted Krusty the Clown scene. Brent Forrester wrote the Krusty Burger scene, while Rachel Pulido wrote the Bumblebee Man one. Richard Appel wrote a deleted "elaborate fantasy segment" revolving around Marge, the only remnant of which is her cleaning the sink during the first Lisa scene, and also a scene with Lionel Hutz that was dropped.

The first draft was 65 pages long and needed to be cut down to just 42, so numerous scenes were removed for time or because they did not fit into the overall dynamic of the episode. To solve this problem, a scene before the second act break, where the townspeople go to the Simpson house to provide advice of how Lisa can get the gum out of her hair, was created to include every character that did not appear anywhere else during the course of the episode. Weinstein and writing supervisor Greg Daniels were responsible for ordering and linking together the episodes, and director Jim Reardon had the challenge of segueing between each section in a way that did not make the change seem abrupt. Those that were hard to link were put before or after an act break or were given a theme song, one of which was cut from the Apu story, but was included as a deleted scene on The Complete Seventh Season DVD.

Oakley wrote the Chalmers scene because he is his all-time favorite character from the show. The main reason he loved him was that, until Frank Grimes was created for the season eight episode "Homer's Enemy", Chalmers was the only character that "seemed to operate in the normal human universe". In previous episodes, Skinner and Chalmers' scenes together revolved around one joke: Skinner tells Chalmers an unbelievable lie, but Chalmers believes him anyway. So, their scene in this episode is made up of a string of thirteen interconnected lies. The dialogue between him and Skinner was something that had never been done before, in that it is just a long relaxed conversation with nothing important being said at all. The idea behind the scene was to make fun of the classic sitcom trope of taking the boss home for dinner, the boss doubting his employee's lies and ultimately believing them. Oakley wrote the scene in one afternoon, with the finished product resembling almost exactly its first draft. Layout artist Sarge Morton was given the task to storyboard the whole scene, as he had an affinity for scenes featuring both Skinner and Chalmers.

In the Mr. Burns story, every word he yells at Smithers is real and used correctly. To maintain accuracy, the writers used a 19th-century slang thesaurus. Many of the Spanish words used in Bumblebee Man's segment are easily understood cognates of English and not accurate Spanish; this was done deliberately so that non-Spanish speakers could understand the dialogue without subtitles. Ian, the very tall man, was a caricature of writer Ian Maxtone-Graham also sharing his first name, and the crowd on the street who laugh at Nelson, Oakley wrote in the script that the street was filled with Springfield's biggest idiots; the animators drew caricatures of him, Weinstein, and Groening into the scene.

== Cultural references ==
The episode's title is a reference to François Girard's film Thirty Two Short Films About Glenn Gould. The episode contains numerous references to Quentin Tarantino's Pulp Fiction. Like the film, the episode is episodic, though the stories are interconnected. The policemen's conversation about McDonald's parallels the famous "Royale With Cheese" discussion, and the music played during the segment's beginning was also taken from the film. The story involving Chief Wiggum and Snake is a direct parody of the "Gold Watch" segment of the film. Snake runs over Wiggum at a red light, alluding to the segment of the film where the character of Butch Coolidge did the same to Marsellus Wallace, before crashing into a fire hydrant and beginning an on-foot chase. The two run into Herman's Military Antique shop, where Herman beats, ties up and gags the two, then waits for "Zed" to arrive, exactly as Maynard does in Pulp Fiction. The writers were pleased that Herman already existed, as otherwise they would have had to create another character just for this scene. The song Apu briefly dances to at Sanjay's party is "Freak-A-Zoid" by American R&B group Midnight Star. The Dr. Nick segment is a parody of ER. After passing the board, Dr. Nick exclaims "Free nose jobs for everybody!"; Jasper Beardsley says "Give me a Van Heflin."

== Reception ==
In its original broadcast, "22 Short Films About Springfield" finished tied for 73rd in the weekly ratings for the week of April 8–14, 1996, with a Nielsen rating of 6.9. It was the seventh highest rated show from the Fox network that week. It is Bill Oakley's personal favorite episode, but he claimed that it is hated by two prominent (and unnamed) figures within the running of the show. The episode is frequently cited as a popular one among the show's fans on the Internet.

In 1998, TV Guide listed it in its list of top twelve Simpsons episodes.

Entertainment Weekly, in 2003, placed the episode 14th on their top 25 The Simpsons episode list, praising the episode's structure and finding the Pulp Fiction references "priceless". The episode is the favorite of British comedian Jimmy Carr who, in 2003, called it "a brilliant pastiche of art cinema".

In 2004, Empire named the episode's Pulp Fiction parody the seventh best film gag in the show, calling Wiggum and Snake bound and gagged with red balls in their mouths "the sickest visual gag in Simpsons history".

Gary Russell and Gareth Roberts, the authors of the book I Can't Believe It's a Bigger and Better Updated Unofficial Simpsons Guide, called it "an untypical episode, and a very good one", naming the Skinner and Chalmers story as the best.

In 2019, several sources cited the episode as one of the show's best, including Consequence of Sound who ranked it number five on its list of top 30 Simpsons episodes; Entertainment.ie who named it among the 10 greatest Simpsons episodes of all time; The Guardian who named it one of the five greatest episodes in Simpsons history; and, in early 2010, IGN named "A Fish Called Selma" the best episode of the seventh season, adding that "22 Short Films About Springfield" was "good competition" for the crown. When The Simpsons began streaming on Disney+ in 2019, Oakley named this one of the best classic Simpsons episodes to watch on the service.

Emily St. James praised the episode: "'22 Short Films' is fundamentally an experiment, an attempt by the series to do something different at a time when coming up with stories must have started to get exhausting. But it's also a wonderful reminder of how everybody on this show was the protagonist of some other, weirder show. The Simpsons might have been the center of the series, but they didn't need to be the only thing in it anymore. Springfield had ceased to be a solar system with them as the sun. Instead, everybody else had become stars of their own, and the show expanded into a galaxy."

=== Legacy ===
==== Unproduced spin-off ====
The episode sparked the idea among the staff for a spin-off series entitled Springfield Stories or simply Springfield. The proposed show would focus on the town in general, rather than the Simpson family. Every week would be a different scenario, such as three short stories, an adventure with young Homer, or a story about a background character that was not tied into the Simpson family at all. According to Bill Oakley, the show was not just going to focus on secondary and minor characters, but also in other things that were outside the normal Simpsons universe, with the episodes being "free-form", but Josh Weinstein recalls that executive producer James L. Brooks "didn't go for it". The idea never resulted in anything, as Groening realized that the staff did not have the capacity to produce another show as well as The Simpsons. By 2006, the staff maintained that it was something that they would still be interested in doing, and by 2007 that it "could happen someday". "22 Short Films About Springfield" also helped inspire the Futurama episode "Three Hundred Big Boys".

==== "Steamed Hams" ====
In one segment of the episode, titled "Skinner & The Superintendent", a frenzied Seymour Skinner attempts to pass off fast food hamburgers as home-cooked "steamed hams", claiming that it is an expression in the regional dialect of Albany, New York, and later attempts to explain away a growing kitchen fire as an improbable case of aurora borealis. Starting in 2016, over two decades from the episode's premiere, the scene gained renewed popularity in Facebook groups and pages relating to The Simpsons. It has also spawned numerous parody and remix videos on YouTube, many of them featuring "Steamed Hams But..." in their titles.

In 2018, Bill Oakley, the writer of the segment, posted the original draft for the segment on Twitter. He said he believed it was the most famous thing he had written, and that it was also one of his favorites. Some months later, a reporter for GameSpot convinced Jeff Goldblum to read part of the script during an interview about the video game Jurassic World Evolution. Goldblum commented at the end of the reading, "I like the writing, too—that was from what?" Oakley responded immediately on Twitter, writing, "[I'm] not a fan of fairly big companies like GameSpot having famous actors perform scripts I wrote, verbatim, without giving me any sort of credit whatsoever." The video was taken down within days.

In a 2021 interview with The Hollywood Reporter, Oakley, Weinstein, animation director Jim Reardon, voice actor Hank Azaria and Simpsons showrunner Al Jean shared their thoughts about the popularity of "Steamed Hams". Azaria said he was confused about how popular the segment had become. Reardon became aware of it when his daughters pointed it out a few years prior. They shared their favorite "Steamed Hams" parodies, including one made with Lego animation, one animating the characters in the style of the music video for the song "Take On Me" by A-ha, and one with the dialogue synchronized to the vocals of "Basket Case" by Green Day. Weinstein said that Groening also enjoyed the phenomenon. A Twitch channel streaming a 24/7 series of procedurally generated "Steamed Hams" parodies premiered in 2023. Oakley described it as "truly uncanny". In 2025, a series of short film pastiches by Canadian director Tyrone Deise recreated the scene in the style of the Soviet film The Glass Harmonica, the German expressionist film The Cabinet of Dr. Caligari, and the 1981 comedy-drama film My Dinner with Andre.

== Availability ==
On March 12, 2002, the episode was released in the United States on a DVD collection titled The Simpsons Film Festival, along with the season eleven episode "Beyond Blunderdome", the season four episode "Itchy & Scratchy: The Movie", and the season six episode "A Star Is Burns".

The DVD boxset for season seven was released by 20th Century Fox Home Entertainment in the United States and Canada on December 13, 2005, nine years after it had completed broadcast on television. The episode features an optional audio commentary track featuring Richard Appel, David X. Cohen, Matt Groening, Bill Oakley, Rachel Pulido, Jim Reardon, David Silverman, Yeardley Smith, and Josh Weinstein.
