= Trust but Clarify =

- The Simpsons episode
- Episode no.: Season 28; Episode 5
- Directed by: Mike Frank Polcino
- Written by: Harry Shearer
- Production code: VABF21
- Original air date: October 23, 2016

Guest appearance
- Dan Rather as himself

Episode features
- Chalkboard gag: "The first episode of the second 600"
- Couch gag: Homer reluctantly visits an art museum with Marge and Lisa. Then, in a scene drawn in the style of modern art, he finds himself on the couch with an abstract version of Maggie. Homer instead becomes drawn in Ben-Day dots.

Episode chronology
← Previous "Treehouse of Horror XXVII"	Next → "There Will Be Buds"
- The Simpsons season 28

"Trust but Clarify" is the fifth episode of the twenty-eighth season of the American animated television series The Simpsons, and the 601st episode of the series overall. It aired in the United States on Fox on October 23, 2016, making it the first episode to air in October the week after the annual Treehouse of Horror. The title is based on the phrase "Trust but verify", used in relation to nuclear verification. This episode was written by voice actor Harry Shearer and directed by Mike Frank Polcino.

In this episode, Kent Brockman is fired for lying about an experience, but Lisa and Bart go to him to report a discovery while Homer tries to get a promotion at work. Journalist Dan Rather guest starred as himself. The episode received mixed reviews.

== Plot ==
Grampa hangs with other war veterans at a bar when "The Late Late Late Night with Jimmy Jimmy" is on with Kent Brockman as its guest star. At the show, Kent starts telling war stories such as when he crash landed a falling helicopter on a sinking container. Another war veteran at the bar however confirms that Kent's story was false. As result, Kent apologizes about all the fake stories he told on air. He is fired for it and replaced by Arnie Pye.

Meanwhile, Krusty the Clown introduces a new product called Krustaceans, which are more palatable than other Krusty-brand food products. Lisa soon finds out that the candy is extremely addictive and leaves a tingling sensation, so she teams up with Bart to discover why. They manage to break into one of the Krusty factories, steal samples from the product and take them to Professor Frink where they find out it contains formaldehyde.

Lisa tries to put the story on Channel 6, but they refuse to air it. Kent is depressed because he is unable to find a new job at the news scene and contemplates suicide. Lisa asks him to cover his story about Krusty's new product. He is reluctant, but at a meeting, he is encouraged to take Lisa's story as an opportunity for a comeback, so he and Lisa record Krusty admitting that his product was bad and manages to get his job back. This time, Kent gives the credit to Lisa.

Homer is envious as a power plant employee that barely speaks English got a corner office, so Homer's Ambition tells him to dress better to make higher chances of getting a promotion. Homer asks Marge for help and they buy a suit for Homer. The next day, Homer goes into Mr. Burns' office giving him reasons for him to get a promotion, but he fails. Homer's Ambition is beaten by his apathy, alcoholism, anger and awe and thrown out Homer's ear, so he decides to go to Moe's Tavern.

== Production ==
This is the first episode written by Simpsons actor Harry Shearer. Journalist Dan Rather appeared as himself.

== Cultural references ==
Kent Brockman’s controversy is a reference to the Brian Williams Iraq War controversy. The Itchy & Scratchy cartoon in the episode, "Mousetrapping a Murderer", is a parody of the true crime television series Making a Murderer. The company Bizzfad featured in the episode is a parody of the digital media company BuzzFeed.

== Reception ==
Dennis Perkins of The A.V. Club gave the episode a B− stating, "In the end, 'Trust But Clarify' is pretty forgettable in the grand scheme, although hardly negligible. It’s not fair to the episode to measure it against the higher expectations caused by Shearer’s heightened involvement, but it’s also not unreasonable to think that the multi-talented Shearer’s writing credit here might have nudged it into some more interesting territory, either."

Tony Sokol of Den of Geek gave the episode 4 out of 5 stars. He stated that Harry Shearer made the episode fresh but keeping with the formula from the early episodes. He felt the modern animation of the episode dampens the effectiveness of the jokes. Sokol later named this episode the third-best episode of the 2010s.

"Trust but Clarify" scored a 1.5 rating with a 5 share and was watched by 3.36 million viewers, making it the most watched show on Fox that night.
