= The Fight Before Christmas =

The Fight Before Christmas may refer to:

- The Fight Before Christmas (1994 film), spaghetti western comedy film
- "The Fight Before Christmas" (The Simpsons), episode 8 of the twenty-second season
- "The Fight Before Christmas" (Frasier), episode 11 of the season 7.
