= The Front (The Simpsons) =

- The Simpsons episode
- Episode no.: Season 4 Episode 19
- Directed by: Rich Moore
- Written by: Adam I. Lapidus
- Production code: 9F16
- Original air date: April 15, 1993

Guest appearance
- Brooke Shields as herself

Episode features
- Chalkboard gag: "I will not sell miracle cures"
- Couch gag: The Simpsons, and a thousand circus performers, form a kickline. The theme song briefly interpolates "Entry of the Gladiators" by Julius Fučík.
- Commentary: Matt Groening; Al Jean; Mike Reiss; Adam I. Lapidus; Rich Moore

Episode chronology
← Previous "So It's Come to This: A Simpsons Clip Show"	Next → "Whacking Day"
- The Simpsons season 4

"The Front" is the nineteenth episode of the fourth season of the American animated television series The Simpsons. It originally aired in the United States on Fox on April 15, 1993. In the episode, Bart and Lisa decide to write an episode of The Itchy & Scratchy Show; after their script is rejected, they resubmit it under the name of their grandfather Abraham Simpson, resulting in Grampa being hired as a staff writer. Meanwhile, Homer returns to high school to retake a failed science course.

The episode was written by Adam I. Lapidus and directed by Rich Moore. Actress Brooke Shields guest starred as herself. It is the only Simpsons episode written by Lapidus.

== Plot ==
After being disappointed by a new episode of Itchy & Scratchy, Bart and Lisa decide to write a cartoon script themselves. Inspired by the sight of Homer accidentally slicing Marge's hair off with hedge shears, they write a script titled "Little Barbershop of Horrors" and send it to Roger Meyers Jr., head of Itchy & Scratchy International. Lisa also sends Meyers a letter that explains why she and Bart wrote the script; Meyers reads the letter and then rejects the script before even looking at it.

Correctly guessing that Meyers did not take them seriously because they were children, Bart and Lisa resubmit the script under Grampa's name. Meyers loves the script and hires Grampa as a staff writer. Bart and Lisa inform Grampa of their scheme, and the trio conspire to continue passing off Bart and Lisa's scripts as Grampa's, splitting the money three ways. Bart and Lisa's cartoons are met with acclaim from audiences, resulting in Meyers firing Itchy & Scratchy's entire writing staff except for Grampa.

Meanwhile, Homer and Marge attend their "Class of 1974" high school reunion, where they have a great time and Homer wins a variety of humorous awards. However, Principal Dondelinger interrupts the ceremony to announce that Homer technically never graduated from high school due to failing a remedial science course and revokes all of Homer's awards. Determined to win back the accolades, Homer retakes the course and passes the final exam, finally graduating.

For "his" work on Itchy & Scratchy, Grampa is nominated for an award for Outstanding Writing In An Animated Series. Krusty the Clown and Brooke Shields present the award. When Grampa watches "Little Barbershop of Horrors" for the first time in a clip show introducing the award's nominees, he is appalled at the violent humor. Grampa wins the award, but in his acceptance speech, he condemns the cartoon's violence and the viewers who enjoy it. Grampa storms off the stage as the audience boos and pelts him with fruits and vegetables. Grampa gives the award to Bart and Lisa, and Bart declares he will never watch an award show again, "unless that delightful Billy Crystal is involved".

== Production ==
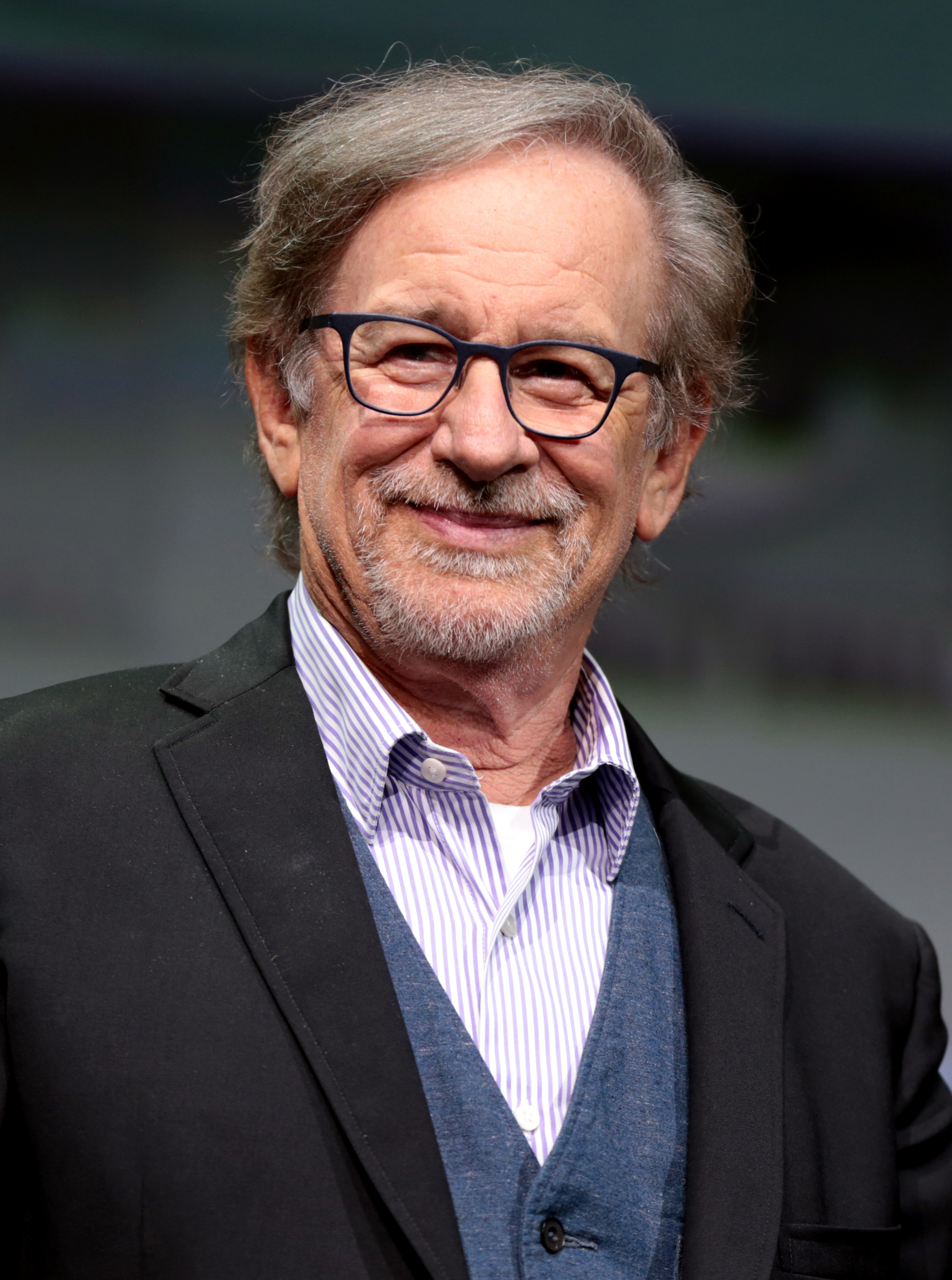
The plot of the episode was inspired by Steven Spielberg's positive reaction to a script that three teenagers had written for Tiny Toon Adventures.

"The Front" was written by Adam I. Lapidus and directed by Rich Moore. In the early 1990s, Lapidus saw a news report on television about three 13-year-old girls—Renee Carter, Sarah Creef, and Amy Crosby—who had written a script for Tiny Toon Adventures, titled "Buster and Babs Go Hawaiian". The show's executive producer, Steven Spielberg, liked the script so much that he brought the three to Hollywood to work on the episode with the show's writing staff. Upon seeing the report, Lapidus thought, "That would really be a neat idea for Bart and Lisa." He wrote a spec script, which made its way via executive producer James L. Brooks to the Simpsons staff, who hired Lapidus to work with them on the episode. "The Front" is the only Simpsons episode written by Lapidus, causing some dispute among the show's fans whether he actually exists or was perhaps a pseudonym. Lapidus' mother-in-law came upon one such debate on an Internet forum.

The initial running time for "The Front" was "way, way short", and the writers had to use "every trick in the book" to make the episode reach the minimum length. Even after greatly expanding the original script and adding an extra-long couch gag during the opening sequence, the episode was still one minute too short; The Adventures of Ned Flanders was added to address the problem. The segment, which plays at the end of the episode, was designed purely as filler and had nothing to do with the other events of the episode. Showrunner Mike Reiss later commented, "As always, when we try something bold and new the general reaction is, 'What the hell was that?'" The scene was also an homage to Archie Comics, which sometimes used a similar technique to fill a final page; the font used in the scene's title card is similar to the font used by Archie. The short inspired writers Bill Oakley and Josh Weinstein to produce the season seven episode "22 Short Films About Springfield".

The Fox network censors had two objections to "The Front". The first issue was with a dream sequence in which Bart points a machine gun at Santa Claus and hijacks his sleigh. The second objection was to a scene not included in the finished episode, in which Itchy & Scratchy animators are seen observing a cat, and then putting a stick of dynamite in the cat's mouth and lighting it. As Meyers, Bart and Lisa continue down the studio's corridor, an explosion emanates from the room. The scene was cut because of the implied animal abuse, but is included as a deleted scene on the show's The Complete Fourth Season DVD box set.

Marge and Homer's high school classmate Artie Ziff makes a brief appearance in the episode; his conversation with Homer inspired the season 13 episode "Half-Decent Proposal". Artie's usual voice artist Jon Lovitz was not available, so regular cast member Dan Castellaneta provided the voice instead. The school principal, Dondelinger, was named after someone Sam Simon knew.

== Cultural references ==
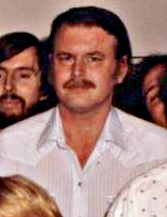
Lisa reads a fictional book titled How to Get Rich Writing Cartoons, by John Swartzwelder, The Simpsons' most prolific writer.

The title of the episode is a reference to The Front, a 1976 film about writers fronting for blacklisted writers in the 1950s. The Simpsons writers considered trying to make the plot resemble that of the film, but in the end decided against it. The episode includes several in-jokes about The Simpsons and animation in general. In a scene depicting the Itchy & Scratchy writer's lounge, each of the writers shown is a caricature of someone working on The Simpsons at the time. The joke was conceived by the show's animators. Roger Meyers fires a Harvard alumnus who resembles Simpsons writer Jon Vitti. At the awards ceremony, The Simpsons creator Matt Groening is shown in the audience. Lisa is also seen reading a book titled How to Get Rich Writing Cartoons by John Swartzwelder, a Simpsons writer credited with nearly sixty episodes of the show. The credits at the end of Bart and Lisa's Itchy & Scratchy episode (shown in very small print) are a copy of the credits at the end of The Simpsons. Meyers, giving the kids a tour of the studio, says "Sometimes, to save money our animators will reuse the same backgrounds over and over and over again" as they walk past the same background.

Homer misremembers his high-school days as the sitcom Happy Days, referencing characters such as Ralph Malph, Potsie, The Fonz (whom he believed to be his friends in high school), and Pinky Tuscadero, while naming Tom Bosley as his father.

At the Annual Cartoon Awards, the clip from the nominated The Ren & Stimpy Show is merely a black screen with the text "clip not done yet" a reference to the series' frequent failure to meet deadlines. This was a counterattack against Ren & Stimpy creator John Kricfalusi, who had attacked The Simpsons staff by saying that "the show succeeded despite the writing", and similarly derogatory comments. Another industry reference is the "Animation Wing" door at Itchy & Scratchy studios; the door is identical to a door at the Disney animation building.

Besides copying the Simpsons credits, the Itchy & Scratchy credits also parody the sequence seen at the end of the credits of many TV shows produced by Stephen J. Cannell, where Cannell sits at the typewriter in his office and throws a sheet of paper into the air, with it forming of part of his production company's logo. In the episode, Itchy and Scratchy are seen at a desk; Scratchy (who is wearing a shirt, similar to the one that Cannell wore in the 1985 version of the logo) pulls a sheet from his typewriter and throws it into the air, where it forms an "I & S Productions" logo. Mike Reiss later met Cannell, who was so pleased with the homage that he hugged Reiss.

== Reception ==
In its original broadcast, "The Front" finished 21st in ratings for the week of April 12–18, 1993, with a Nielsen rating of 12.5, equivalent to approximately 11.6 million viewing households. It was the highest-rated show on the Fox network that week.

Gary Russell and Gareth Roberts, the authors of the book I Can't Believe It's a Bigger and Better Updated Unofficial Simpsons Guide, praised "The Front" as "an ironic look at the animation industry, with a higher than average Itchy and Scratchy count. The episode is followed by Itchy & Scratchy with its own, rather wonderful, theme tune."
