= Days of Wine and D'oh'ses =

- The Simpsons episode
- Episode no.: Season 11; Episode 18
- Directed by: Neil Affleck
- Written by: Deb Lacusta; Dan Castellaneta
- Production code: BABF14
- Original air date: April 9, 2000

Episode features
- Chalkboard gag: "I was not touched "there" by an angel"
- Couch gag: The crudely drawn Simpson family from The Tracey Ullman Show shorts are on the couch. The Simpsons, as they are currently drawn, come in. All ten of them scream and run out the living room.
- Commentary: Mike Scully; George Meyer; Ian Maxtone-Graham; Dan Castellaneta; Deb Lacusta; Neil Affleck

Episode chronology
← Previous "Bart to the Future"	Next → "Kill the Alligator and Run"
- The Simpsons season 11

"Days of Wine and D'oh'ses", also known as "Days of Wine and (Annoyed Grunt)'ses", is the eighteenth episode of the eleventh season of the American animated television series The Simpsons. It originally aired on the Fox network in the United States on April 9, 2000. In the episode, Barney realizes how much of a pathetic drunk he is after watching his birthday party video and decides to give up alcohol forever, which upsets his friend Homer. Meanwhile, Bart and Lisa work together to take a memorable photo for a new phone book cover contest.

It was the first episode of the show to be written by cast member Dan Castellaneta and his wife Deb Lacusta. They originally pitched the story during the production of the series' fourth season, but the concept was rejected on the basis of being too similar to the episode "Duffless"; it was later revived by showrunner Mike Scully.

Several staff members opposed the idea of Barney becoming sober because they did not think his character change would be funny. Several critics, including Chris Turner, were also not fond of Barney's change.

== Plot ==
Believing that no-one remembered his birthday, Barney is shown an embarrassing video of his birthday party, during which he is mocked by his friends with gag gifts including coupons from Moe for helicopter-flying lessons at the Springfield Flight School. Realizing that he is a hideous drunk, being so intoxicated that he forgot the events of that day, Barney vows to get sober. At first, he finds sustaining sobriety tough, but he finds his way to an AA meeting with Homer's help, and soon takes the helicopter lessons using the coupons. At Moe's Tavern, Homer is treated as the new Barney and is forced by Moe, Lenny, and Carl to perform drunken antics. Barney gives Homer a ride in the helicopter a few lessons later with the two arguing about Barney's new sobriety and Homer's unhappiness that they no longer have ridiculous adventures.

Meanwhile, to get their picture on the cover of the new phone book and win the prize of a new bike, Bart and Lisa enter an amateur photo contest. They find an old camera with an old roll of film and start to take snapshots with it. One day, they are taking pictures atop Mt. Springfield when Bart inadvertently starts a forest fire by carelessly discarding a hot flashbulb, putting them in imminent danger.

At Moe's, Barney arrives to make amends for his drunken behavior; when he and Homer see the news report of the fire, they band together to save Bart and Lisa. They hop in the helicopter, but land in the middle of a bridge when Barney panics over flying the helicopter, having not yet finished the lessons. When a Duff beer truck on the bridge spills its contents in front of Barney, Homer refuses to let him give up on sobriety and drinks an entire six-pack in his place, leaving Barney touched at his gesture. Together, Barney and a drunken Homer save the kids, and Bart commemorates the moment by taking a photo of the fire on Mt. Springfield, submitting it as his and Lisa's entry to the photo contest.

The next day, at the Simpson house, Marge tells the children that the new phone books are here, and they have Bart and Lisa's picture on the front cover. Bart and Lisa realize that the picture on one of the phone books is not that of the fire on Mt. Springfield; it is actually a photo of baby Bart and Lisa naked on the toilet, causing them to scream in horror. Marge says that the shot was in the film on the camera and that since she had taken it, she won the bike for them. Bart and Lisa, after accepting that they will be the laughingstock of the entire town, happily hug their mother, because they got the bike. Meanwhile, Barney's confidence and his friendship with Homer are restored, and he looks forward to an alcohol-free future, although he is now addicted to double-tall mocha lattes. It transpires that the coffees Barney drink are really supplied by Moe, who is secretly ensuring that Barney remains a customer to him.

== Production ==
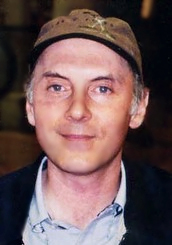
Cast member Dan Castellaneta and his wife wrote the episode.

"Days of Wine and D'oh'ses", the eighteenth episode of the eleventh season of The Simpsons (1999–2000), was the first episode to be written by Dan Castellaneta and his wife Deb Lacusta, and directed by Neil Affleck. In the early 1990s, Castellaneta, the voice of Homer, Barney, and many other characters on the show, conceived the idea to write an episode in which Barney sobers up. He told Lacusta of the idea, who wrote a draft that they then revised together. They presented their script to Al Jean when he and Mike Reiss were show runners on The Simpsons. Though Jean liked the story, he turned it down because the staff was already working on a similar episode where Homer gives up beer—"Duffless" (1993). Castellaneta and Lacusta waited several years and presented their script, which they had updated, to then-showrunner Mike Scully (1997–2001), who liked it but had them make some changes.

Several members of the staff, including The Simpsons creator Matt Groening, have stated that they were against the episode as they felt Barney being sober was not funny. After a long discussion about how the episode should end, the writers decided that they did not want Barney to return to being drunk at the end of the episode. The character's new addiction to coffee was suggested by writer/producer David Mirkin, who had friends that had stopped drinking alcohol and became addicted to coffee. For the episode, the animators gave Barney back-slicked hair to indicate his sobriety, a look which Barney maintained in subsequent episodes until he relapsed in "I'm Spelling as Fast as I Can" (2003). Castellaneta altered his voice for the sober Barney by no longer slurring.

== Reception ==
The episode originally aired on the Fox network in the United States on April 9, 2000. The episode received a Nielsen rating of 8.3 and was the second highest-rated show on Fox network that week, following Malcolm in the Middle. On October 7, 2008, it was released on DVD as part of the box set The Simpsons – The Complete Eleventh Season. Staff members Mike Scully, George Meyer, Ian Maxtone-Graham, Dan Castellaneta, Deb Lacusta and Neil Affleck participated in the DVD audio commentary for the episode. Deleted scenes from the episode were also included on the box set.

While reviewing the eleventh season of The Simpsons, DVD Movie Guide's Colin Jacobson commented that the episode "manages some good bits but not enough to make it a quality program." He also wrote that "If you thought that 'Alone Again, Natura-Diddily' would be Season 11's sole episode that features a big change for a secondary character, you thought wrong. No, Barney's sobriety isn't as major an event as Maude's demise, but it actually has a bigger impact on the series. After all, Maude was a tertiary role; her disappearance affects secondary personality Ned, but she didn't appear all that much, so she didn't really go missed. Making Barney sober affects the series on a much more consistent basis – though probably not in a good way. After all, most of Barney's appeal came from his drunken idiocy, so he loses his natural kick when he goes on the wagon."

Several other writers have commented on Barney becoming sober. IGN staff members stated in 2006 that Barney has "been a dependable source of humor through his many drunken asides, burps included...Occasionally he's sobered up...But let's face it, for comedy's sake, The Simpsons is better off with a drunken Barney mouthing off at Moe's."

Author Chris Turner wrote in his book Planet Simpson that "Barney is a good example of what happens when [the staff members] tinker too much. Barney was great as just the town drunk. Making him sober falls into the trap of all the stuff The Simpsons satirizes, all those simple sitcom narratives where everything is wrapped up in half an hour and everyone learns a lesson in the end."

In 2001, "Days of Wine and D'oh'ses" received a commendation from the Prism Awards, which honors accurate portrayals of substance abuse, addiction and mental health in entertainment programming.
