= There Will Be Buds =

- The Simpsons episode
- Episode no.: Season 28; Episode 6
- Directed by: Matthew Faughnan
- Written by: Matt Selman
- Production code: VABF22
- Original air date: November 6, 2016

Guest appearance
- Joe Mantegna as Fat Tony

Episode chronology
← Previous "Trust but Clarify"	Next → "Havana Wild Weekend"
- The Simpsons season 28

"There Will Be Buds" is the sixth episode of the twenty-eighth season of the American animated television series The Simpsons, and the 602nd episode of the series overall. The episode was directed by Matthew Faughnan and written by Matt Selman. It aired in the United States on Fox on November 6, 2016.

In this episode, Homer coaches a children's lacrosse team with Kirk Van Houten, who disappears when he learns that Homer thinks he is a loser. The episode received mixed reviews.

This episode was dedicated to longtime Simpsons writer Kevin Curran, who died on October 25, 2016 from cancer complications.

== Plot ==
During the season opener game of the Springfield Neutrinos peewee football team, an excessive amount of special effects smoke fills the field, causing the entire team to crash into each other and, even though no one seems to be hurt, the parents freak in assuming that they have suffered concussions and the football season is suspended. At a town meeting, no one is happy with alternatives like baseball or basketball and, when Kirk Van Houten tries to pitch the idea of coaching a junior lacrosse team, nobody wants to hear it. Marge feels bad that everyone, including Luann, treats Kirk like garbage and orders a reluctant Homer to make the crowd shut up and listen to Kirk. The pitch, which includes a description of lacrosse as a cross between "soccer and hockey" and a display of great ability by Milhouse himself, leads everyone to ignore the very high rate of concussions in lacrosse and create a new kids' league for it.

The team is formed with Kirk and Homer as coaches, where Kirk does the actual coaching while Homer sits on the sidelines cutting oranges. Their team wins their games easily, making it all the way to the championship match and giving the kids a great time. Kirk's coaching skills stem from his experience as a star lacrosse player in college; he had been on the verge of turning professional, but his hopes were ruined when he broke his wrist giving a high five to the school mascot, dressed in a suit of armor. Though Homer is impressed by Kirk's coaching, he becomes increasingly annoyed by all the time they are forced to spend together, not least when Kirk keeps trying to get Homer to go to strip clubs when Homer does not want to. After a musical number, during which he hears Homer insult him at length and call him a loser, Kirk disappears just as the team needs him for the championship game.

When Lisa asks Homer what is going on, he gives up his denial and confesses to driving Kirk away. Homer finds out from Luann that Kirk has withdrawn all his money in $1 bills, and instantly realizes that Kirk fled to a strip club. Encouraged by Marge, the team and, eventually, the rest of the crowd, Homer goes to search for Kirk and finds him at Clubbb Sinnn talking to the strippers. When Homer tries to get Kirk to come back for the game, he angrily declines and says nothing between him and Homer was real. When Homer says he respects Kirk for turning their loser kids into winners, Kirk is inspired to come back to coaching. Then the owner reminds Kirk that he owes back $15,000 for the time he has spent in the club and proceeds to have the club's security block the exits. Fortunately for Homer and Kirk, the club's strippers are sympathetic to their situation, as they are all mothers with young children, and allow them to use a helicopter from the club to get to the game just in time and the team wins. Afterwards, while the kids enjoy a victorious pizza party, Homer sincerely offers Kirk a high-five. The gesture causes both men to break their wrists, leaving them sharing a hospital room, where Homer continues to be annoyed by Kirk.

During the credits, Kirk does a MyTube video that someone keeps skipping to different parts all the way to the end, which includes a segment on preparing his famous rice sandwiches and a reference to 9/11 conspiracy theories.

== Production ==
Writer and executive producer Matt Selman wanted to make the lacrosse look authentic, but no one on the show played lacrosse. The creative team watched videos, used a lacrosse dictionary, and checked with former lacrosse players. Selman stated, "We wanted insider references so that someone who does play lacrosse is going to watch this and not go 'Oh, these guys are just throwing it in.'" The children in the episode watched a video of the Gait brothers playing at Syracuse. Gary Gait, a Simpsons fan, was not aware he would be mentioned in the episode, but thought it was "one of his biggest honors."

Along with the following episode "Havana Wild Weekend", "There Will Be Buds" was a holdover from the previous season's production run. It was the final episode to be produced in this run and the last episode of the series to be animated by Film Roman, before the show moved its domestic production to Fox Television Animation.

== Reception ==
Dennis Perkins of The A.V. Club gave the episode a B+ stating, "The episode looks great. The cozy familiarity of Springfield’s yellow-dominated color scheme is so universal that it’s easy to overlook the show’s visuals. But the design and blue-and-gold palette of the kids’ uniforms is striking, and there’s a nicely thought-out fluidity to both the brief snippets of in-game action and movement all through the episode. The clearly defined motion and purpose of the lacrosse sticks makes for some truly funny and excitingly-designed sight gags, too...Matthew Faughnan’s direction makes it all crisp and fun to watch. It’s one story, well-told. A Simpsons episode with a little time to breathe (this one skips the theme song and couch gag entirely) is often a good sign."

Tony Sokol of Den of Geek gave the episode 2.5 out of 5 stars. He called the episode boring because of the focus on Milhouse's dad and could have been better with a strong secondary plot.

"There Will Be Buds" scored a 1.4 rating with a 5 share and was watched by 3.14 million people, making it Fox' highest rated show of the night.
