= Gump Roast =

- The Simpsons episode
- Episode no.: Season 13; Episode 17
- Directed by: Mark Kirkland
- Written by: Deb Lacusta; Dan Castellaneta
- Production code: DABF12
- Original air date: April 21, 2002

Guest appearances
- All archive footage: Alec Baldwin as himself; Kim Basinger as herself; *NSYNC as Themselves; U2 as themselves; Stephen Hawking as himself; Ron Howard as himself; Elton John as himself; Lucy Lawless as herself; Joe Namath as himself; Elizabeth Taylor as Maggie Simpson

Episode features
- Couch gag: The couch is a slot machine that shows Homer, Marge, Bart and Lisa in the windows. Maggie, however, is replaced by lucky number 7 as a jackpot siren is heard and a pile of gold coins spill out.
- Commentary: Matt Groening; Al Jean; Matt Selman; John Frink; Don Payne; Deb Lacusta; Tom Gammill; Max Pross

Episode chronology
← Previous "Weekend at Burnsie's"	Next → "I Am Furious (Yellow)"
- The Simpsons season 13

"Gump Roast" is the seventeenth episode of the thirteenth season of the American animated television series The Simpsons. It originally aired on the Fox network in the United States on April 21, 2002. In the episode, Homer Simpson is honored by the townspeople at a Friars' Club Roast, until it is interrupted by Kang and Kodos.

The episode was directed by Mark Kirkland and written by Dan Castellaneta and his wife Deb Lacusta. The plot idea came about when Simpsons cast members were on hiatus following a payment dispute. This is the fifth and, to date, the last clip show The Simpsons has produced. Despite receiving a 5.7 rating and 12.2 million in viewership when first broadcast, the episode received negative reviews from critics.

== Plot ==
Homer Simpson sits on a park bench holding a box of chocolates, when Chief Wiggum appears to arrest him for impersonating a movie character. Homer begins to tell a story from his past, but Wiggum is uninterested until Homer begins to use flashbacks. The Simpson family then arrives to take Homer to the Friars' Club, where he is roasted by Krusty the Clown and other prominent citizens of Springfield. Among them are Bart and Lisa and Mr. Burns (whose attempt to warn the people of Springfield about Homer's incompetence is taken as a joke, much to his dismay). The roasters utilize more clips from previous episodes.

Soon, Kang and Kodos arrive at the roast and declare that humans are stupid, as demonstrated by more clips. However, they probe Maggie's brain and see her memories through a monitor, which moves them to tears, but Kodos angrily denies it, claiming that they were just vomiting from their eyes. Maggie's mind also reveals more clips, this time featuring various celebrities. A starstruck Kang and Kodos make a deal with the citizens of Springfield: they will spare the Earth if the townspeople give them tickets to the People's Choice Awards and the Daytime Emmys. They do, and Kang and Kodos are seen enjoying an award ceremony.

The episode ends with the song "They'll Never Stop the Simpsons", which recounts additional past plots, possible future plots, and an apology for airing this clip show.

== Production ==
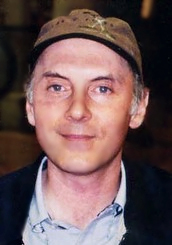
Dan Castellaneta wrote the episode with his wife Deb Lacusta.

"Gump Roast" was co-written by Dan Castellaneta and his wife Deb Lacusta, while Mark Kirkland served as director. It was first broadcast on the Fox network in the United States on April 21, 2002. The idea for the episode came about when Castellaneta and the other main Simpsons cast members were on hiatus while renegotiating their salaries. Lacusta and Castellaneta, discussing the film Forrest Gump, wondered if the stories Gump told actually happened or if he made them up. They realized that Gump was similar to Homer, who's also dimwitted and has "fumbled into" an array of larger-than-life situations. When the cast members settled the salary issue and returned to work, Castellaneta and Lacusta presented their script to show runner Al Jean, who put the episode into production.

The scene in which Homer skis down a mountain (from S11E10, "Little Big Mom") is one of the show's most frequently used clips, according to Jean. The appearance of Kang and Kodos marks a rare appearance outside their usual roles in the annual Halloween episodes. "Gump Roast" was the series's last clip show. Instead, as Jean states in the episode's DVD commentary, the show now produces "trilogy episodes", which feature three separate stories based on a given theme. One of these anthology episodes has aired each season since season 14, replacing the clip shows.

The song "They'll Never Stop The Simpsons" that plays at the end of the episode was written by Simpsons writer Matt Selman and sung by Castellaneta. A parody of Billy Joel's “We Didn't Start the Fire”, it was originally the same length as that song, but was edited when the episode ended up running long. In 2011, the song was rerecorded with alternate lyrics for a music video after The Simpsons was renewed for a 24th and 25th season. Castellaneta recorded eight new takes, which were mixed with some of the original vocals.

== Referenced clips ==
Episode	Season	Description
Homer the Heretic	4	Homer dreams of being in the womb.
Homer Simpson in: "Kidney Trouble"	10	In a flashback, Homer tells how he and Grampa were never close, but still loved each other.
The Way We Was	2	Homer tells how he met Marge in high school.
Take My Wife, Sleaze	11	Homer and Marge dance at Greasers Cafe.
Natural Born Kissers	9	Nude Homer and Marge hide behind some lawn ornaments.
Bart Gets an Elephant	5	Homer tells how Bart got an elephant.
The City of New York vs. Homer Simpson	9	Homer drives the car on the street of New York, with the boot still on his car.
Faith Off	11	Homer recklessly drives the car, with the bucket still glued to his head.
Dumbbell Indemnity	9	Homer tries escaping from Moe's stolen car by rolling out, only to roll over a rock, back in the car, and then drives off a cliff.
Grift of the Magi	11	Bart and Lisa do Christmas caroling to distract families while Homer steals their Funzo dolls.
Brush with Greatness	2	Bart and Lisa repeatedly ask Homer to take them to Mt. Splashmore.
Thirty Minutes over Tokyo	10	The family gets seizures from watching Battling Seizure Robots.
Montage sequence	10–12	Past scenes of Homer singing.
Homer to the Max	10	The crowd watches Homer as he's working, waiting for him to do something stupid.
Mountain of Madness	8	A fire drill at the nuclear power plant.
Little Big Mom	11	Homer fails at skiing.
When You Dish Upon a Star	10	Homer goes para sailing.
Mom and Pop Art	10	Homer fails at building his BBQ pit.
Montage sequence	3–13	Homer strangling Bart.
Children of a Lesser Clod	12	Homer chases Bart with a mace.
Home Sweet Homediddly-Dum-Doodily	7	Maggie almost chooses the Flanders family just before Marge comes over.
Lisa's First Word	4	Maggie says her first word, "Daddy" (in this version, Nancy Cartwright replaces Elizabeth Taylor as the voice of Maggie).
Montage sequence	9–12	Scenes of guest stars that have previously appeared on the show

== Cultural references ==
The opening scene, which shows Homer sitting on a bench holding a box of chocolates, is a reference to the movie Forrest Gump. At one point Homer drunkenly quotes the film Secrets & Lies. The act that Ned Flanders and Reverend Lovejoy are performing at the roast is an homage to the Smothers Brothers, who would later appear on The Simpsons in the episode “O Brother, Where Bart Thou?”. Moe dresses as Austin Powers from the comedy film series. Dr. Hibbert wears a costume of the character Darth Vader from the Star Wars series, and Mr. Burns approaches the podium to the sound of "The Imperial March", a.k.a. "Darth Vader's Theme". The song "They'll Never Stop The Simpsons" is a parody of Billy Joel's song "We Didn't Start The Fire".

== Release ==
In its original American broadcast on April 21, 2002, "Gump Roast" was watched by 12.2 million viewers, according to Nielsen Media Research, making it the 16th most watched television show of the week, as well as the highest-ranked show on the Fox network. It received, along with a new episode of Malcolm in the Middle, a 5.7 rating among adult viewers between ages 18 and 49, meaning it was seen by 5.7% of the population in said demographic.

Following the home video release of the thirteenth season of The Simpsons, "Gump Roast" received overwhelmingly negative reviews from critics. Both Ron Martin of 411Mania and Adam Rayner of Obsessed with Film wrote that the episode's premise is "lazy", and Rayner added that he felt "cheated". Andre Dellamorte of Collider was negative as well, writing that the episode “does a very poor job at justifying its existence". The episode's plot was criticized by reviewers; Jennifer Malkowski of DVD Verdict called the plot "lackluster" and added that it "doesn't really make sense—and I mean that last part in a bad way!" Nate Boss of Project-Blu held a similar view, stated that the plot "made no sense" and that the episode as a whole was "complete lameness." James Greene of Nerve put the clip show third on his list Ten Times The Simpsons Jumped the Shark, stating that "You'd think by 2002 The Simpsons would've generated enough cash for FOX that they were no longer beholden to archaic penny-saving concepts like the clip show." Some reviewers considered the episode to be the worst of the season. However, Colin Jacobson of DVD Movie Guide stated that, even though he thought the episode was "a cheap excuse for a new episode", he found that it "provokes more laughs than many of the other season 13 episodes since it quotes better programs from the past." Furthermore, the song at the end of the episode was well received by Malkowski, who described it as the best moment of the episode.
