= Thursdays with Abie =

- The Simpsons episode
- Episode no.: Season 21; Episode 9
- Directed by: Mike Frank Polcino
- Written by: Mitch Glazer &; Don Payne
- Production code: MABF02
- Original air date: January 3, 2010

Guest appearances
- Mitch Albom as himself; Marcia Wallace as Edna Krabappel

Episode features
- Couch gag: Homer and the rest of the family get launched into a pinball game called "Couch Gag Chaos".

Episode chronology
← Previous "O Brother, Where Bart Thou?"	Next → "Once Upon a Time in Springfield"
- The Simpsons season 21

"Thursdays with Abie" is the ninth episode of the twenty-first season of the American animated television series The Simpsons. In this episode, Grampa meets a human interest journalist who writes and publishes Grampa's life stories, which makes Homer jealous. While giving his story of Mr. Burns to the newspaper, he finds out that the journalist plots to kill Grampa. Meanwhile, Bart is forced to care for a stuffed lamb as part of a class project and gives the lamb to Lisa.

The episode was written by Mitch Glazer & Don Payne and directed by Mike Frank Polcino. Mitch Albom guest stars in the episode.

Being the first episode to air in the 2010s, it originally aired on the Fox network in the United States on January 3, 2010, "Thursdays with Abie" was watched by about 8.65 million people and received a 4.0 Nielsen rating.

The episode also received positive reviews from critics.

== Plot ==
During a trip to a water park with the family, Grampa Abe meets a journalist named Marshall Goldman. Abe is thrilled that Marshall is interested in hearing his rambling anecdotes, and tells of the time he sat on and Animal trained a real shark during World War II, after the warship he served on was sunk by a torpedo (which they themselves fired earlier) in the Pacific Ocean. Marshall publishes Abe's story in the Springfield Shopper. When Homer reads Marshall's article, he is shocked that other people find Abe's stories interesting. In his next anecdote, Abe tells of giving a not-yet-famous Clark Gable a shoe shine at the Springfield railway station and lending him a copy of Gone with the Wind, but still remembers his anger at not being paid. A rapt Marshall writes up this story as well and Abe's fame grows. Homer decides to visit his father, but Abe tells him off, suggesting that Homer only wants to spend time with him now that he is famous. Later, Marge suggests that, in actuality, Homer is angry with himself for not having spent more time with his dad. Insulted at the not-so-false suggestion, Homer listens to Mr. Burns' anecdotes, writes his own column and takes it to the Springfield Shopper (where it is quickly shredded). While at the newspaper office, Homer sneaks into Marshall's office and discovers a manuscript that Marshall intends to submit for a Pulitzer Prize. The manuscript states that Abe is dead and Homer realizes that Marshall intends to kill Abe. He rushes to the railway station, but Abe and Marshall have already departed on a vintage train known as the Tinseltown Starliner (Clark Gable went to the same train after Abe does his shoe polishing). After knocking out Abe, Marshall attempts to suffocate him with a pillow. With the help of Lenny and Carl, Homer breaks through a window just as Marshall pulls out a gun. The two struggle, and then Abe pulls the emergency brake and Marshall is knocked out by a vast load of hat boxes. Homer and his father reconcile, with Abe telling Homer that he is ready for his first ramble.

Meanwhile, Bart has possession of Larry the Lamb, a stuffed sheep toy that each child in Mrs. Krabappel's room takes a turn caring for over a weekend, much to the dismay of Nelson, who says that Larry was "all that kept me sane" in song. Bart resents the stuffed toy, so Lisa offers to take care of him. However, she accidentally loses Larry down a storm drain. Bart goes in to retrieve him, and is chased by sewer rats and sewer cats before finding Larry atop a pipe. Bart uses Larry to slide to safety but the toy rips and Bart unceremoniously crashes through a grate to a beach, where Agnes Skinner (who all this time has heard the children calling out for "Larry") tells Bart to "Give him my number. I'll teach him things. Things he can use."

== Production ==
The episode was written by Mitch Glazer & Don Payne and directed by Mike Frank Polcino. Mitch Albom who wrote Tuesdays with Morrie makes a guest appearance.

== Cultural references ==
"Thursdays with Abie" serves as a parody of Tuesdays with Morrie in which Mitch Albom learns about life values from his former teacher Morrie Schwartz. Simpsons voice actor Hank Azaria, who voices Marshall, also played Albom in the film based on Tuesdays with Morrie. The opening Flyby gag is a parody of the Wicked Witch of the West from The Wonderful Wizard of Oz. The Slimu octopus is a parody of Shamu, the killer whale. The song that plays during the train station scenes is the American jazz standard "Chattanooga Choo Choo". Also Nelson sings a different version of "Mary Had a Little Lamb".

== Reception ==
In its original American broadcast, "Thursdays with Abie" was viewed by an estimated 8.65 million households and received a rating of 4.0 rating/10 share in the 18/49 rating being the most viewed and highest rated episode on Fox's Animation Domination. The show ranked seventh in the 18/49 rating and was third on Fox for the week after The OT and The Allstate Sugar Bowl and made it 20th in the weekly ratings (it was still Fox's top rated scripted show).

The episode got a positive review from IGN's Robert Canning giving it an 8.4/10 and saying that "Overall, the episode was a success, using one of the best Simpsons running jokes to tell an engaging and even sentimental tale".

Emily VanDerWerff of The A.V. Club gave episode a C+ saying that "Most of the core relationships on The Simpsons have hung on to their ability to move us. Most Homer and Lisa episodes are still touching on some level, while most Bart and Lisa episodes play off the two's easy camaraderie. One of the exceptions to this rule is the relationship between Homer and his dad. The two had some great episodes in the show's early going, as the series examined the way that Abe's inability to be a good single parent reverberated down through the years (in a much, much funnier way than that sounds)."

Jason Hughes of TV Squad stated in his review "I didn't find the episode particularly funny, but I appreciated that The Simpsons did bring a bit of that emotion back to the character's relations".

Dan Castellaneta was nominated for the Primetime Emmy Award for Outstanding Voice-Over Performance at the 62nd Primetime Creative Arts Emmy Awards for playing Abraham Simpson and Homer Simpson in this episode, but lost to Anne Hathaway who won for her role in another The Simpsons episode "Once Upon a Time in Springfield."
