= Today I Am a Clown =

- The Simpsons episode
- Krusty's bar mitzvah
- Episode no.: Season 15; Episode 6
- Directed by: Nancy Kruse
- Written by: Joel H. Cohen
- Production code: FABF01
- Original air date: December 7, 2003

Guest appearances
- Jackie Mason as Rabbi Hyman Krustofsky; Mr. T as himself

Episode features
- Chalkboard gag: "Over forty and single is not funny"
- Couch gag: The Simpsons each slide down their own pole into the Batcave, where everyone is dressed like the characters from the 1960s Batman TV show (Homer is Batman, Marge is Catwoman, Maggie and Lisa are Batgirl, and Bart is Robin, the Boy Wonder).
- Commentary: Al Jean; Joel H. Cohen; Matt Selman; Carolyn Omine; Tim Long; Don Payne; Tom Gammill; Max Pross; Dan Castellaneta; Nancy Kruse; Steven Dean Moore

Episode chronology
← Previous "The Fat and the Furriest"	Next → "'Tis the Fifteenth Season"
- The Simpsons season 15

"Today I Am a Clown" is the sixth episode of the fifteenth season of the American animated television series The Simpsons. It originally aired on the Fox network in the United States on December 7, 2003. The episode was written by Joel H. Cohen and directed by Nancy Kruse.

In this episode, Krusty has a Bar Mitzvah after admitting his did not have one when he was younger while Homer hosts a talk show when Krusty is away. Jackie Mason guest starred as Rabbi Hyman Krustofsky. Mr. T appeared as himself. The episode received mixed reviews. Actor Dan Castellaneta won an Emmy Award for his performance in this episode.

== Plot ==
Maggie locks herself in the bathroom, leaving the entire family waiting outside. Lisa unlocks the door with a coat hanger, after an unsuccessful attempt by Homer results in the contents of the medicine cabinet being spilt everywhere, including a bottle of Pepto-Bismol which Homer mistakens for "baby blood". Suddenly, the Simpson family is visited by Dr. Hibbert, who says that Santa's Little Helper impregnated his poodle, and he gives the puppies to the Simpson family. Lisa recalls that Santa's Litter Helper was neutered after having a litter previously, (Note: As depicted in the sixth season episode "Two Dozen and One Greyhounds") but Homer admits he felt guilty and chose not to bring the dog to the procedure. Bart and Lisa give out the puppies to people including Krusty the Clown, who takes his new puppy for a walk to his old neighborhood in the Jewish community of Springfield. There, he sees the Jewish Walk of Fame. He finds out that he does not have a star on the sidewalk and goes to register for one. However, when Krusty is asked for the date of his Bar Mitzvah, Krusty confesses that he never had one. As a result, he is told he is not truly Jewish. Krusty encounters Bart and Lisa outside, and he tells them of his problem.

Bart and Lisa wonder how Krusty did not have a Bar Mitzvah since his father is a rabbi. They go to Rabbi Hyman Krustofsky, who says that he was afraid that Krusty would make a mockery of the whole ceremony. Lisa says that Krusty can still have his Bar Mitzvah as an adult, as there is nothing in Judaism that forbids it. Krusty agrees to it. With this happening, Krusty cannot do shows on Saturdays because it is the Sabbath. He hires Homer to replace him for the day because he will not be better than Krusty. Homer's replacement show is a talk show, which becomes successful as he discusses topics that are interesting to people. Meanwhile, Krusty continues to learn his Jewish traditions from his father. In response to The Homer Simpson Show's surprising success, Krusty's show is cancelled.

Lisa tells Homer to use his popularity to discuss political and economic topics, but Homer's show is cancelled when ratings decline. Meanwhile, to regain his popularity, Krusty pitches to the Fox network to broadcast his Bar Mitzvah live. When it airs, it becomes a ratings success, but the spectacle disappoints his father. Krusty feels guilty, and, after the show, he holds a real Bar Mitzvah the traditional way in a synagogue.

== Production ==
Jackie Mason reprised his role as Rabbi Hyman Krustofsky. He previously appeared in this role in the third season episode "Like Father, Like Clown". Actor Mr. T appeared as himself.

== Reception ==
=== Viewing figures ===
The episode was watched by 10.5 million viewers, which was the 39th most-watched show that week.

=== Critical response ===
Colin Jacobson of DVD Movie Guide thought it was a "flat episode; a few laughs appear, but not enough to make this an above-average show."

On Four Finger Discount, Brendan Dando and Mitchell Grinter thought the episode did not go deep enough into both the main plot and subplot. They thought the Homer subplot was not necessary.

In 2012, Vulture named "Today I Am a Clown" as one of the nine later Simpsons episodes that was as good as the show's classic era. In 2014, it ranked the episode as the 74th best episode to stream. In 2019, a new ranking from Vulture called it the 75th best episode.

=== Awards and nominations ===
Series regular Dan Castellaneta won the Primetime Emmy Award for Outstanding Voice-Over Performance for his roles in this episode as Homer Simpson, Krusty the Clown, Grampa Simpson, Groundskeeper Willie, Barney Gumble, and Sideshow Mel.

Writer Joel H. Cohen was nominated for the Writers Guild of America Award for Outstanding Writing in Animation at the 57th Writers Guild of America Awards for his script to this episode.
