= Primetime Emmy Award for Outstanding Voice-Over Performance =

List of film award recipients

- Awarded for: Outstanding continuing or single voice-over performance in a series or special
- Country: United States
- Presented by: Academy of Television Arts & Sciences
- First award: 1992
- Final award: 2013
- Website: emmys.com

The Primetime Emmy Award for Outstanding Voice-Over Performance was a Creative Arts Emmy Award given out by the Academy of Television Arts & Sciences. It was awarded to a performer for an outstanding "continuing or single voice-over performance in a series or a special." Prior to 1992, voice actors could be nominated for their performance in the live-action acting categories. The award was first given in 1992 when six voice actors from The Simpsons shared the award. From 1992 to 2008, it was a juried award, so there were no nominations and there would be multiple or no recipients in one year. In 2009, the rules were changed to a category award, with five nominees.

Usually, winners would be voice actors from animated shows, but some narrators of live-action shows won such as Keith David in 2005 and 2008. No winner was named in 1996 or 2007.

Nine voice actors from The Simpsons won a combined 14 Emmys in the category. Of those, Dan Castellaneta won four and Hank Azaria won three. Ja'net Dubois won two for The PJs, Keith David won two for his narration of various documentaries, and Maurice LaMarche won two for Futurama. Voice actors from shows on Fox won 17 of the 27 awards presented.

In 2014, the category was separated into two categories – Outstanding Narrator and Outstanding Character Voice-Over Performance. This split acknowledged and accommodated a general industry uptrend in the distinctly different achievements that are voice-over narration and voice-over character performance.

== Rules ==
While most of the Primetime Emmy Awards choose winners from a group of nominees, the award for Outstanding Voice-Over Performance was juried from 1992 to 2008. Each entrant was screened by a panel of Academy of Television Arts & Sciences members from the Animation branch as well as members of the Acting branch with voice-over credits. Potential nominees had to submit a DVD that contained an edited version of a single episode and a picture of the character(s) that were voiced. Submissions that were less than 30 minutes had to be edited to be shorter than five minutes; entries longer than 30 minutes were edited to be less than ten. Prior to 2007, the maximum edited lengths were ten and fifteen minutes respectively. Each entrant with majority approval went on to a second panel. Emmy winners had to be unanimous choices of this second panel, except that for every 12 persons or fraction thereof on the panel, one "no" vote was allowed, except from the head of the panel.

In 2009, the Academy changed the award from a "juried" award to a "category", with six nominees and one winner.

== Winners (1992–2008) ==
Year	Winner	Character(s)	Series or special	Network	Ref.
1992	Nancy Cartwright	Bart Simpson	The Simpsons: "Separate Vocations"	Fox	
1992	Dan Castellaneta	Homer Simpson	The Simpsons: "Lisa's Pony"	Fox	
1992	Julie Kavner	Marge Simpson	The Simpsons: "I Married Marge"	Fox	
1992	Jackie Mason	Rabbi Krustofski	The Simpsons: "Like Father, Like Clown"	Fox	
1992	Yeardley Smith	Lisa Simpson	The Simpsons: "Lisa the Greek"	Fox	
1992	Marcia Wallace	Edna Krabappel	The Simpsons: "Bart the Lover"	Fox	
1993	Dan Castellaneta	Homer Simpson, Barney Gumble, Abraham Simpson and other characters	The Simpsons: "Mr. Plow"	Fox	
1994	Christopher Plummer	Narrator	Madeline	Family	
1995	Jonathan Katz	Dr. Katz	Dr. Katz, Professional Therapist	Comedy Central	
1996	No Emmy awarded in this category				
1997	Jeremy Irons	Siegfried Sassoon	The Great War and the Shaping of the 20th Century: "War Without End"	PBS	
1997	Rik Mayall	Mr. Toad	The Wind in the Willows	Family	
1998	Hank Azaria	Apu Nahasapeemapetilon	The Simpsons	Fox	
1999	Ja'net Dubois	Mrs. Florence Avery	The PJs	Fox	
2000	Seth MacFarlane	Stewie Griffin	Family Guy	Fox	
2000	Julie Harris	Susan B. Anthony	Not for Ourselves Alone: The Story of Elizabeth Cady Stanton & Susan B. Anthony	PBS	
2001	Hank Azaria	Comic Book Guy, Apu, Carl Carlson, Lou, Chief Wiggum and Moe Szyslak	The Simpsons: "Worst Episode Ever"	Fox	
2001	Ja'net Dubois	Mrs. Florence Avery	The PJs: "Let's Get Ready To Rumba"	The WB	
2002	Peter Macon	Narrator	Animated Tales of the World: "John Henry, the Steel Driving Man"	HBO	
2002	Pamela Adlon	Bobby Hill, Clark Peters and Chane Wassanasong	King of the Hill: "Bobby Goes Nuts"	Fox	
2003	Hank Azaria	Moe Szyslak, Carl Carlson, Chief Wiggum, Apu, Johnny Tightlips, Bumblebee Man and Cletus	The Simpsons: "Moe Baby Blues"	Fox	
2004	Dan Castellaneta	Krusty the Clown, Homer Simpson, Abraham Simpson, Groundskeeper Willie, Sideshow Mel, Barney and Itchy	The Simpsons: "Today I Am A Clown"	Fox	
2005	Keith David	Narrator	Unforgivable Blackness: The Rise and Fall of Jack Johnson	PBS	
2006	Kelsey Grammer	Sideshow Bob	The Simpsons: "The Italian Bob"	Fox	
2007	No Emmy awarded in this category				
2008	Keith David	Narrator	The War: "A Necessary War"	PBS	

== Winners and nominations (2009–2013) ==
Winners are listed first, highlighted in boldface, and indicated with a double dagger (‡).

Year	Nominee	Character(s)	Series or Special	Episode	Network
2009 (61st)	**Dan Castellaneta**‡	**Homer Simpson**	**The Simpsons**	**"Father Knows Worst"**	**Fox**
2009 (61st)	Ron Rifkin	Narrator	American Masters	"Jerome Robbins: Something To Dance About"	PBS
2009 (61st)	Seth Green	Various	Robot Chicken	"Robot Chicken: Star Wars Episode II"	Cartoon Network
2009 (61st)	Seth MacFarlane	Peter Griffin	Family Guy	"I Dream of Jesus"	Fox
2009 (61st)	Harry Shearer	Mr. Burns, Smithers, Kent Brockman and Lenny	The Simpsons	"The Burns and the Bees"	Fox
2009 (61st)	Hank Azaria	Moe Szyslak	The Simpsons	"Eeny Teeny Maya Moe"	Fox
2010 (62nd)	**Anne Hathaway**‡	**Princess Penelope**	**The Simpsons**	**"Once Upon a Time in Springfield"**	**Fox**
2010 (62nd)	H. Jon Benjamin	Sterling Archer	Archer	"Mole Hunt"	FX
2010 (62nd)	Dave Foley	Wayne	Prep & Landing		ABC
2010 (62nd)	Seth Green	Cobra Commander, Movie Narrator and Robot Chicken Nerd	Robot Chicken	"Cannot Be Erased, So Sorry"	Cartoon Network
2010 (62nd)	Hank Azaria	Apu and Moe Szyslak	The Simpsons	"Moe Letter Blues"	Fox
2010 (62nd)	Dan Castellaneta	Grampa Simpson and Homer Simpson	The Simpsons	"Thursdays with Abie"	Fox
2011 (63rd)	**Maurice LaMarche**‡	**Lrrr, Orson Welles**	**Futurama**	**"Lrrreconcilable Ndndifferences"**	**Comedy Central**
2011 (63rd)	Bob Bergen	Porky Pig	The Looney Tunes Show	"Jailbird And Jailbunny"	Cartoon Network
2011 (63rd)	Dan Castellaneta	Homer Simpson, Krusty the Clown, Barney Gumble, Louie	The Simpsons	"Donnie Fatso"	Fox
2011 (63rd)	Seth Green	Batman, Cobra Commander, Judge, Light Cycle Driver, Newscaster, Robot Chicken Nerd, Teenager, Venger	Robot Chicken	"Catch Me If You Kangaroo Jack"	Cartoon Network
2011 (63rd)	Christopher Plummer	Narrator	Moguls and Movie Stars	"The Birth of Hollywood"	TCM
2011 (63rd)	Brenda Strong	Mary Alice Young	Desperate Housewives	"Come on Over for Dinner"	ABC
2012 (64th)	**Maurice LaMarche**‡	**Clamps, Donbot, Hyperchicken, Calculon, Hedonismbot, Morbo**	**Futurama**	**"The Silence of the Clamps"**	**Comedy Central**
2012 (64th)	Hank Azaria	Moe Szyslak, Duffman, Mexican Duffman, Carl, Comic Book Guy, Chief Wiggum	The Simpsons	"Moe Goes from Rags to Riches"	Fox
2012 (64th)	Dan Povenmire	Doctor Doofenshmirtz	Disney Phineas And Ferb: Across The 2nd Dimension		Disney
2012 (64th)	Rob Riggle	Noel	Prep & Landing: Naughty vs. Nice		ABC
2012 (64th)	Brenda Strong	Mary Alice Young	Desperate Housewives	"Give Me the Blame" / "Finishing the Hat"	ABC
2012 (64th)	Kristen Wiig	Lola	The Looney Tunes Show	"Double Date"	Cartoon Network
2013 (65th)	**Lily Tomlin**‡	**Narrator**	**An Apology to Elephants**		**HBO**
2013 (65th)	Seth MacFarlane	Brian Griffin, Stewie Griffin, Peter Griffin	Family Guy	"Brian's Play"	Fox
2013 (65th)	Alex Borstein	Lois Griffin and Tricia Takanawa	Family Guy	"Lois Comes Out Of Her Shell"	Fox
2013 (65th)	Seth Green	Abin Sur, Aquaman, Batman, Green Arrow, Martian Manhunter, Nerd and Robin	Robot Chicken	"Robot Chicken DC Comics Special"	Cartoon Network
2013 (65th)	Sam Elliott	Narrator	Robot Chicken	"Hurtled From A Helicopter Into A Speeding Train"	Cartoon Network
2013 (65th)	Bob Bergen	Porky Pig	The Looney Tunes Show	"We’re In Big Truffle"	Cartoon Network

== Multiple wins ==
Wins include Outstanding Narrator and Outstanding Character Voice-Over Performance

4 wins

- Hank Azaria
- Dan Castellaneta
- Seth MacFarlane
- Maya Rudolph

3 wins

- David Attenborough
- Keith David

2 wins

- Ja'net Dubois
- Jeremy Irons
- Maurice LaMarche
- Barack Obama
