= Barney Gumble =

Fictional character from The Simpsons franchise

- The Simpsons character
- First appearance: "Simpsons Roasting on an Open Fire"; December 17, 1989
- Created by: Matt Groening
- Based on: Barney Rubble
- Designed by: Dan Haskett
- Voiced by: Dan Castellaneta

In-universe information
- Full name: Barnard Gumble
- Gender: Male
- Occupation: Barney's Bowl-A-Rama (ex-owner) helicopter pilot, snowplow driver, astronaut, military service (unknown occupation and branch served in)
- Family: Arnie Gumble (deceased father); Mrs. Gumble (mother); Al Gumble (uncle)

Barnard "Barney" Gumble is a recurring character in the American animated TV series The Simpsons. He is voiced by Dan Castellaneta and first appeared in the series premiere episode "Simpsons Roasting on an Open Fire".

Barney is the town drunk of Springfield and one of Homer Simpson's best friends. His loud belches and desperation for alcohol serve as frequent sources of humor on the show, though Barney sobered up in the Season 11 episode "Days of Wine and D'oh'ses" before relapsing three years later. Barney was inspired by the cartoon character Barney Rubble from The Flintstones and by several barflies from other television programs. In 2004, Castellaneta won an Emmy Award for voicing various characters, including Barney.

Barney can be seen in The Simpsons opening credits since 2009, passed out under a pile of leaves (but still holding his beloved bottle of Duff Beer) and being awoken by Bart Simpson skateboarding over his stomach, causing him to let out his trademark belch.

== Role in The Simpsons ==
Barney's father, Arnie Gumble, was a World War II veteran who died in 1979 in a parade float accident. Little is known about his mother, except that she lives in Norway and that she served in the United States Navy, including duty on a submarine. She is seen in the season nine episode "Simpson Tide". In "Treehouse of Horror XVII", Barney stated that he was Polish, after mistakenly saying he was Irish in a drunken stupor. Barney was born on April 20 (which Homer remembers is also Hitler's birthday in "Viva Ned Flanders") In "A Star Is Burns", Barney states that he is 40 years old. Several episodes, starting with "The Way We Was", depict him as Homer's best friend in high school. In the episode "$pringfield", he claims that he studied dance for several years, including modern and tap.

Two episodes give different reasons for his alcoholism. "Mr. Plow" suggests that Barney was a dedicated student looking forward to a bright future. He had his mind set on going to Harvard University, until Homer peer pressured him into drinking beer the day before the SATs. Season 16's "She Used to Be My Girl" attributes his drinking to his high school girlfriend Chloe Talbot leaving Springfield to pursue a journalism career.

In "Homer's Barbershop Quartet", Barney formed a barbershop quartet with Homer, Apu Nahasapeemapetilon, and Seymour Skinner called the Be Sharps. Barney was asked to join when the other members heard him singing in a beautiful tenor voice in the restroom of Moe's Tavern, replacing the group's original fourth member, Chief Wiggum, who had been kicked out. In 1986, the Be Sharps won a Grammy Award for Outstanding Soul, Spoken Word, or Barbershop Album of the Year. Soon, creative disputes arose, and Barney left the group in all but name when he began dating a Japanese conceptual artist. The group realized that they were no longer popular and split up.

Barney was rescued from a tar pit by Bart's pet elephant Stampy in "Bart Gets an Elephant" and he also started a snowplowing business rivaling Homer's in "Mr. Plow". Barney's commercial defamed Homer, causing Homer to lose his customers. As revenge, Homer fooled Barney into plowing a driveway on Widow's Peak, a treacherous mountain just outside Springfield. When Homer saw a news report showing that Barney had become trapped in an avalanche, Homer immediately drove to the mountain and rescued Barney. The friends resolved their differences and agreed to work together. However, a heat wave hit Springfield at that exact moment, driving them both out of business. However, in the episodes "O Brother, Where Bart Thou?" and "Miracle on Evergreen Terrace" it is shown that Barney still drives his Plow King truck.

After being forced to spend a sober night at Moe's Tavern serving as designated driver, Barney left town in Homer Simpson's car to, among other things, give a guest lecture at Villanova (although, by his own admission, the guest lecture could just have likely occurred on a street corner). He ultimately abandoned the car in New York City and returned to Springfield after a two-month absence. A gag in "Selma's Choice" suggests that Barney is the father of many local babies born through (presumably, paid) donation of semen and the resulting artificial insemination.

Barney made a documentary film about his life as an alcoholic, titled Pukahontas. It won the top prize at the Springfield Film Festival. He was ready to quit drinking after winning the Festival, but the prize he received was a lifetime supply of Duff Beer. In "Deep Space Homer", Barney trained to become an astronaut for NASA. Under their alcohol-ban, he quickly regained his balance and diction and was quite appropriately selected to fly with Buzz Aldrin. However, he reverted to his old ways when he was presented with a bottle of non-alcoholic champagne. Barney served in the United States Navy Reserve as a submariner on the USS Jebediah, alongside his mother, in "Simpson Tide".

In "Days of Wine and D'oh'ses", after watching a video of his drunken antics at his birthday party, Barney resolves to get sober. He attends Alcoholics Anonymous meetings, cleans up his appearance, and attends helicopter-flying lessons. He remains sober by the episode's end, though his alcoholism is replaced by an unhealthy dependence on coffee. It was revealed in the fourteenth season episode "I'm Spelling as Fast as I Can" that he had relapsed.

== Character ==
=== Creation ===
Barney was inspired by Barney Rubble, Fred Flintstone's best friend and next-door neighbor from the animated series The Flintstones. The writers originally wanted the character to be Homer Simpson's sidekick and next-door neighbor, but instead, while still portraying him as Homer's best friend, they decided to make him an alcoholic. Ned Flanders would become the next-door neighbor instead. "Barney was taking the standard sitcom sidekick and just making him as pathetic as possible," said Matt Groening, the creator of The Simpsons. The writers drew further inspiration from Crazy Guggenheim, a character played by comedian Frank Fontaine on The Jackie Gleason Show. Part of the reason the writers went in that direction, according to Groening, was because of "a sort of unspoken rule about not having drinking on television as a source of comedy. So, of course, we went right for it." The writers also patterned the character after Norm Peterson (George Wendt), a character from the sitcom Cheers.

In some early first season episodes, Barney had yellow hair. Later in the production of that season, the producers had it changed to brown, because they thought that his hair looked like his skin; in addition, during an artistic convention of the show, Groening stated that he wanted only the Simpsons to have yellow hair. Animation director Rich Moore modeled Barney's apartment on one he and several other animators who worked on the show shared, particularly the Farrah Fawcett poster and the cable spool table. The writers originally intended for the character to be the owner of Barney's Bowl-A-Rama. However, after making him "pathetic", they could not regard him as a business owner any longer, and it was explained seasons later in "And Maggie Makes Three" that his Uncle Al owns the alley and named it after him.

=== Voice ===
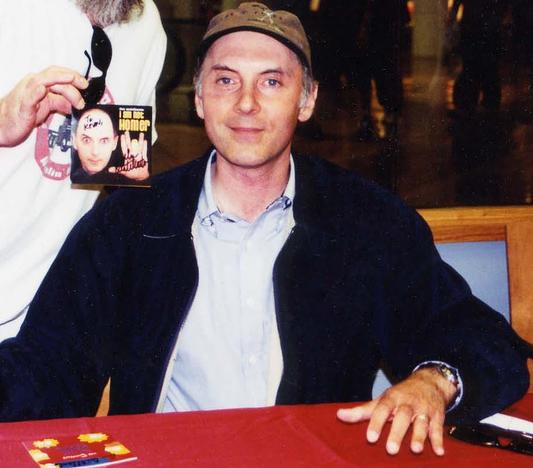
Dan Castellaneta, the voice of Barney.

Barney Gumble is voiced by Dan Castellaneta who said he drew inspiration from Mr. Magoo's nephew Waldo on the 1957 record album Magoo in Hi-Fi where Waldo was voiced by Daws Butler as well as a little big Frank Fontane's Crazy Guggenheim. Early on in the show, Castellaneta discovered that it was not easy for him to do Barney's trademark belch every time a script called for it, so he identified his best belch and told the producers to make that the standard, the belch also appears on an episode of The Pitts. Castellaneta has voiced Barney every time he has appeared in the series, with the exception of the episode "Homer's Barbershop Quartet", in which some of Barney's singing is provided by a member of The Dapper Dans, who recorded lines for all four members of the Be Sharps. Their recordings were intermixed with the cast's, often with a cast member singing the melody and the Dapper Dans providing backup.

=== Sobriety ===
Castellaneta thought of the idea of Barney sobering up early in the series. He wrote a script together with his wife Deb Lacusta. They offered their script to showrunner Al Jean. Jean liked the story, but felt that it was too similar to a script the writers were already working on, "Duffless", so he turned it down. Castellaneta and Lacusta waited several years and offered their script, which they updated, to then-show runner Mike Scully, who liked it and had them make a few changes. Their script became the eleventh season episode "Days of Wine and D'oh'ses", which first aired April 9, 2000. The episode was directed by Neil Affleck, who said that he had "a vested interest in getting Barney sober." However, some of the writing staff was opposed to the episode as they felt Barney sober would not be funny. Castellaneta commented, "He's still a goofy man-child...he's still got 15 years of booze left in his veins."

After a long discussion about how the episode should end, the writers decided that they did not want Barney to return to being drunk at the end of the episode. Barney stayed sober for several seasons. The animators modified the appearance of the character, straightening his hair, among other things, to indicate his sobriety. Castellaneta altered his voice for the character by no longer slurring. Barney was still seen at Moe's Tavern, but only drinking lattes. The character's new addiction to coffee was suggested by writer-producer David Mirkin, who has friends who stopped drinking alcohol and became addicted to coffee.

== Reception ==
Filmcritic.com ranked Barney 18th on their 2008 list of "The 21 Best Movie Alcoholics of All Time". Recognizing the character for his appearance in The Simpsons Movie, Filmcritic called him "the most awesomely funny town drunk in pop culture". IGN ranked Barney fifth on their list of the "Top 25 Simpsons Peripheral Characters" in 2006, stating that, "he's been a dependable source of humor through his many drunken asides, burps included...Occasionally he's sobered up...But let's face it, for comedy's sake, The Simpsons is better off with a drunken Barney mouthing off at Moe's." Author Chris Turner (Planet Simpson) said, "Making [Barney] sober falls into the trap of all the stuff The Simpsons satirizes, all those simple sitcom narratives where everything is wrapped up in half an hour and everyone learns a lesson in the end."

Britain's The Guardian said that Barney "should be hailed for making compulsive drinking a source of comedy on US TV, a hitherto impossible dream." Entertainment Weekly placed "Mr. Plow" sixth on their list of the best 25 Simpsons episodes in 2003. In 2004, Dan Castellaneta won a Primetime Emmy Award for Outstanding Voice-Over Performance for voicing several characters, including Barney, in the episode "Today I Am a Clown". "Days of Wine and D'oh'ses" was nominated for a PRISM Award in 2001.

=== Merchandising ===
Playmates Toys created three Barney Gumble action figures as part of the World of Springfield toy line. The first one, released in August 2000, depicts Barney in his usual appearance. The second, Barney in his Plow King jacket from "Mr. Plow", was released in January 2003. The third, a Toys "R" Us retail exclusive, was released in July 2003 as part of a Be Sharps play set. The song "A Boozehound named Barney" from the episode "Simpsoncalifragilisticexpiala(Annoyed Grunt)cious" was included on the Go Simpsonic with The Simpsons album. Barney plays a role in The Simpsons Ride, launched in 2008 at Universal Studios Florida and Hollywood. During the pre-show, Barney appears in a suit of the character Scratchy to entertain the people waiting in line, but he staggers around drunk and drinks in public, which led to Krusty firing him for drinking on the job. Barney later reappears during the ride portion where he appears outside Moe's Tavern, letting out his signature belch as the Simpson family chases an enlarged Maggie through Springfield.
