= World of Springfield =

Action figures of characters from The Simpsons

The World of Springfield is a series of action figures featuring characters from the animated sitcom The Simpsons. The line ran between December 1999 and December 2004 and was released by Playmates Toys.

The toy action figure series was called World of Springfield, because the concept of the line was for collectors to build a miniature Springfield through a series of interactive action figures and playsets. It eventually encompassed over 200 different figures and characters from the series, 40 interactive playsets (toy re-creations of Simpson's interior settings and town location settings within Springfield), and three non-interactive diorama town settings.

== History ==
From its release in December 1999 during a rise in the popularity of the animated sitcom, the Playmates Interactive World of Springfield figures immediately became a success by focusing in the show's growing supply of characters and providing interactive environments featuring audio clips from the show. The figures ranged from Blue-Haired Lawyer and Sarcastic Guy to well known characters such as Bart and Homer Simpson.

The first wave of figures contained six figures and a set was sold for US$85 in November 2004. At that time, the Waylon Smithers figure from the second wave was considered rare and valued at US$20 and Glow-in-the-Dark-Radioactive Homer, which was distributed through a 2000 ToyFare magazine mail-in offer, is considered the rarest of the line.

In 2002, Playmates released World of Springfield: Celebrity Simpsons playset. At that time, more than 50 figures and 12 playsets were already available. The Celebrity Simpsons set included Homer's half-brother Herb Powell, actor Troy McClure, and Fat Tony as five-inch-tall talking representations of Simpsons characters. To be included in the release, each was considered to have reached cult status in their popularity with viewers. The figures additionally included accessories to provide more interaction. For example, the Fat Tony character included a cigar and pistol, a wad of dough, and a baseball bat and could speak signature lines when placed on a specially designed stand.

== Level of success ==
The mass market appeal of The Simpsons encompasses everyone from young kids who loved the slapstick comedy to adults of all ages who appreciate that the jokes and situations that work on multiple levels of our intellect. Like other classic TV series, fans remember and quote the lines, and Playmates Toys managed to capture that appeal with its interactive playsets.

Each figure came with its own "coded" chip generally set into the character's foot that when contacted with the "trigger" tab on each playset would complete the circuit so by then pressing a nearby button, you would hear playback of one to five phrases for that character. Unique features included audio playback from the show and the actual voice actor; placing the Homer Simpson figure on an appropriate playset would trigger the playback of a quote as performed by Dan Castellaneta on the original episode. Each playset held quotes and voice clip performances for a variety of characters so that placing the Marge Simpson figure or the Bart figure would trigger different quotes and voice clips. One limitation was that not every character worked with every playset — some for story logic reasons (character might not appear at that setting), release logistics (figures released long after a playset) or presumably for cost reasons (as each voice clip had to be approved and licensed).

The sets were released during the dot-com bubble and a healthy economic environment in the United States. The figures themselves cost between US$5.99 and US$7.99 each, while the playsets generally ranged from US$20 to US$25 at the end of 2004. There were also special releases that were in the US$60 range. Even at minimal retail, 200+ figures and 40 playsets meant a large financial commitment. In addition, there were a dozen exclusives and mail-in figures that required extra work to obtain the figures — often via an online auction. However, the early success of the series and the healthy economy added extra momentum to the line for a few more years.

== Discontinuation ==
The line ended in mid-2004 due to a number of factors, most importantly slow sales. Other factors include "collectors fatigue", the release pattern of the figures, the sheer size of the line being difficult for newcomers, the slowing economy, the changing toy retail situation, and Playmates Toys' relationship with 20th Century Fox.

== Vehicles ==
Technically not part of World of Springfield, these vehicles were made by Playmates Toys in June 2001 and in August 2002, and are considered part of the line by some fans. The vehicles did not interact with the other World of Springfield items, and weren't actually able to hold any figures from the line, but by moving the characters that came with the vehicle to the right or the left or by pressing the car's hood a conversation could be created between the characters.

- Family Car with Homer, Marge, Bart, Santa's Little Helper, Lisa, and Maggie. Release date: June 2001
- School Bus with Martin, Milhouse, Ralph, Bart, Lisa and Otto. Release date: August 2002

== KayBee Toys exclusive ==
In August 2002 Playmates Toys released a series of figures through the retail store KB Toys based on the "When Bongos Collide" storyline from Bongo Comics. It featured Simpsons characters transformed into superheroes. The initial three-pack of figures included Homer Simpson as the Indigestible Bulk, Apu as Captain Kwik, and Ms. Krabappel as Vampiredna. Two more three-packs were planned (featuring Marge as the Entangler, Lisa as the Jazzler, Maggie as Brainbaby, Grampa as Oldblood member Coma, and Skinner as The Stickler, and Willie as the Plaid Piper), but the line was cancelled as soon as it hit retail.

== Cancelled items ==
As in most toy lines, items are planned for release that for a number of reasons (cost issues, low retailer interest) never end up being produced and/or released. Many items were cancelled from the World of Springfield line; a complete list is available in the Simpsons Collector Sector's Release Guide. - Link no longer valid

=== Cancelled figures ===
- Rabbi Krustofsky - Was to be include in the Series 2 line of Celebrity Figures, but was cancelled, supposedly because Jackie Mason withdrew his approval.
- Lyle Lanley - Originally part of the Series 3 line of Celebrity Figures, but was replaced by Cooder.
- Molloy - Originally part of Series 12, but was replaced by Number One. Was cancelled when the World of Springfield line ended. Was going to be part of the Mail Away figures.
- Cecil Terwilliger, Sideshow Bob's brother - Voiced by David Hyde Pierce. Was going to be the next set that never came. Would also have included Sushi Chef.

=== Cancelled playsets ===
- Flanders' Rumpus Room with Maude Flanders - Was originally going to be the playset for the Wave 18 line, but was cancelled when the World of Springfield line ended
- Springfield Elementary Playground with Janey - Was going to be a part of the Wave 17 line, but was cancelled when the World of Springfield line ended
- Stonecutter Hall with Stonecutter Carl - Was going to be a Toys-R-Us exclusive, but was cancelled due to slow sales of the Be Sharps playset and the end of World of Springfield line
- 300th Episode Special: Bart's Loft with Skateboarding Homer, Viking Bart, "Indian Burn" Lisa, and Casual Skinner - Was cancelled due to overwhelmingly negative response with fans.
- Oval Office with President Lisa, Old Homer, Old Marge, Grownup Bart, and Maggie Jr. - Was planned as a Toys-R-Us exclusive, but cancelled due to slow sales in previous exclusives

=== Cancelled waves ===
- Wave seventeen: Ninja Bart, Richard & Lewis, Arnie Pie, Akira, Bigfoot Homer, Flying Hellfish Grampa, and Cecil Terwilliger
- Wave eighteen: Lindsay Naegle, Tuxedo Kang, Tuxedo Kodos, Uncle Moe, Sanjay
