= Deb Lacusta =

American television writer and actress

- Born: Detroit, Michigan, U.S.
- Occupations: Television writer; actress
- Years active: 1984–present
- Spouse: Dan Castellaneta (m. 1987)

Deborah Lacusta is an American television writer and actress. She is the wife of voice actor Dan Castellaneta.

== Personal life ==
Lacusta is married to The Simpsons star Dan Castellaneta (who voices Homer Simpson among many other characters). They met at an improvisational comedy class in Chicago.

== Career ==
Lacusta and Castellaneta performed together regularly and had a sketch show on Chicago local radio. In 1992 they starred in the show Deb & Dan's Show at Club Lux at Santa Monica Airport. Some of their comedy pieces were released on the 2002 CD I Am Not Homer.

In the early 1990s, Lacusta and Castellaneta pitched a script for an episode of The Simpsons to showrunner Al Jean. Jean liked the story, but turned it down because he felt it was too similar to "Duffless", an episode that the writers were already working on. They updated their script then, several years later, offered it to showrunner Mike Scully, who liked it, requested a few changes, and entered the result, the eleventh season's episode "Days of Wine and D'oh'ses" into production. It aired April 9, 2000. The two also wrote the episodes "Gump Roast", "The Ziff Who Came to Dinner", "Kiss Kiss, Bang Bangalore", and "The Fight Before Christmas". In 2007, they were nominated for a Writers Guild of America Award for the episode "Kiss Kiss, Bang Bangalore".

== Filmography ==
=== As writer ===
Lacusta and Castellaneta wrote the following episodes of The Simpsons:

- "Days of Wine and D'oh'ses" (2000)
- "Gump Roast" (2002)
- "The Ziff Who Came to Dinner" (2004)
- "Kiss Kiss, Bang Bangalore" (2006)
- "The Fight Before Christmas" (2010)
- "A Midsummer's Nice Dream" (2011)
- "The Ten-Per-Cent Solution" (2011)
- "Havana Wild Weekend" (2016)
- "My Way or the Highway to Heaven" (2018)

=== As actress ===
- The Tracey Ullman Show (1987) – Various characters
- Forget Paris (1995) – Nurse
- The Simpsons (2016) – Isabella (voice) ("Havana Wild Weekend")
