= Grampa Simpson =

Fictional character from The Simpsons franchise

- The Simpsons character
- First appearance: "Grandpa and the Kids"; The Tracey Ullman Show; January 10, 1988
- Created by: Matt Groening; James L. Brooks; Sam Simon
- Designed by: Matt Groening
- Voiced by: Dan Castellaneta

In-universe information
- Full name: Abraham Jay Simpson II
- Occupation: Retired farmer; Retired salesperson; World War II veteran; Retired professional wrestler
- Affiliation: U.S. Army
- Family: Orville Simpson (father); Yuma Hickman (mother); Cyrus Simpson (brother); Chet Simpson (brother); Bill Simpson (brother)
- Spouses: Mona Olsen (divorced; deceased); Rita LaFleur (divorced); Amber (divorced); Selma Bouvier (divorced)
- Significant others: Gaby (deceased); Bea Simmons (deceased); Jacqueline Bouvier; Edwina
- Children: Herb Powell (with Gaby); Homer Simpson (with Mona); Abbey (with Edwina)
- Relatives: Bart Simpson (grandson); Lisa Simpson (granddaughter); Maggie Simpson (granddaughter); Marge Simpson (daughter-in-law); (See also Simpson family)
- Home: Springfield Retirement Castle, Springfield, United States

Abraham Jay "Abe" Simpson II, better known as Grampa Simpson, or simply Grampa, is a recurring fictional character in the animated television series The Simpsons. He made his first appearance in 1988 in the episode entitled "Grandpa and the Kids", a one-minute Simpsons short on The Tracey Ullman Show, before the debut of the television show in 1989.

Grampa Simpson is voiced by Dan Castellaneta, who also voices his son, Homer Simpson. He is the paternal grandfather of Bart, Lisa and Maggie Simpson. In the 1,000th issue of Entertainment Weekly, Grampa was selected as the "Grandpa for The Perfect TV Family". Grampa is a World War II veteran and retired farmer who was later sent to the Springfield Retirement Castle by Homer. He is known for his long, rambling, often incoherent and irrelevant stories and senility.

== Biography ==
Grampa Simpson is the father to Homer Simpson, father-in-law to Marge Simpson and the paternal grandfather to siblings Bart, Lisa and Maggie. Grampa has also fathered two illegitimate children; a daughter named Abbey by a British woman named Edwina while in the United Kingdom during World War II, and Herbert Powell by a carnival prostitute. Grampa has an older brother named Cyrus, who lives in Tahiti and has multiple native wives. He also has a younger brother named Chet, who owns an unsuccessful shrimp company. Other siblings of his include Hubert, Tyrone, Fester, Bill, and Hortense. Grampa was briefly married to Amber, the same woman Homer married on a drinking binge in Las Vegas. Grampa has also been briefly married to Marge's sister, Selma Bouvier, and was once romantically linked to Marge's mother, Jacqueline Bouvier (his son's mother-in-law). Grampa Simpson is also married to Rita LaFleur.

Almost all of Grampa's biographical information is supplied by himself and seems to be made up, although this could be likely due to his old age. Many of his stories seem to be wildly inaccurate, often physically or historically impossible, and occasionally inconsistent even with each other, suggesting that Grampa is quite senile. It is unknown where Grampa was born. He claims that he came to America as a boy from the "old country", but he cannot remember which country it was, although most likely it was the United Kingdom or Ireland. Grampa was raised in New York City with his parents, Orville J. Simpson and Yuma Hickman. He gives his age as 83 in the Season 17 episode "Million Dollar Abie," while in "Grampy Can Ya Hear Me" (season 29), the family celebrates his 87th birthday, although he is canonically 83. In the Season 25 episode "The Winter of His Content," Homer states that Grampa's father is still alive. Due to the show's floating timeline, his age remains the same over the years, and newer episodes still depict him as a World War II veteran. In "The Color Yellow," he reveals that he is the great-great-grandson of Mabel Simpson, a family ancestor who lived during the time of the American Civil War, and Virgil, an escaped slave whom she married after divorcing her first husband Hiram.

Grampa is a veteran of World War II, where he served as Master Sergeant of the Flying Hellfish unit which included himself (the Unit Commander), Radio Operator Sheldon Skinner (Seymour Skinner's father), Private Fifth Class Arnie Gumble (Barney Gumble's father), Asa Phelps, Iggy Wiggum (Clancy Wiggum's father), Milton "Oxford" Haas, Etch Westgrin, Griff McDonald, Private Charles Montgomery Burns and Grey Fox. At the very end of the war in Europe, Grampa's unit "liberated" a stash of priceless art from surrendering German forces. The Flying Hellfish formed a tontine and buried the art in a trunk at sea. Decades later, Burns, the second surviving member of the unit, tried to murder Grampa in order to get the art, prompting Grampa to violate the tontine. When Grampa and Bart retrieved the art from Mr. Burns, the State Department arrived to return the art to its rightful owner. Grampa was a hated wrestler named "Glamorous Godfrey" in the 1950s, revealed in the episode "Gorgeous Grampa", starring him and Mr. Burns.

Homer's mother, Mona Simpson, was married to Grampa for several years. According to "Let's Go Fly a Coot", they met in the 1950s and hooked up on the day Grampa allegedly broke the sound barrier. She became entranced with the hippie lifestyle after seeing Joe Namath's hair on television. She became a fugitive from justice after she abetted in the sabotage of a biological weapons research lab owned by Mr. Burns to deliberately poison everyone in Springfield. To explain this to his then-six-year-old son, Grampa said that Mona died while Homer was at the movies. Grampa has a poor, but sometimes loving relationship with his son, who placed him in a nursing home as soon as he could, despite Grampa selling his house in order to provide Homer with a mortgage. It is recurringly suggested that, while caring, Grampa was a strict disciplinarian who could be very controlling, neglectful, and even emotionally abusive towards Homer when he was growing up and he still had not forgiven him for that. After Mona left Homer at a young age and ran off with a jester, Grampa brought up Homer by himself. In the season four episode, "The Front", Grampa tells Roger Myers Jr., head of Itchy and Scratchy studios, that he worked as a cranberry silo night watchman for forty years.

The Simpson family will often do their best to avoid unnecessary contact with Grampa. A running gag in the show usually has Grampa in a cameo appearance where he wonders where everyone is or wishes to be noticed by the family. One example of this was when the family thought they left something on the plane in the episode "Fear of Flying", which is revealed to be Grampa. Despite this, Homer has shown feelings of love for his father from time to time.

== Character ==
=== Creation ===
Matt Groening, creator of The Simpsons, wanted to have a character that was "really cranky" and old, and who complained a lot and invented stories to tell to children, so he created Grampa. After naming the main characters after his own family members (except for Bart, an anagram of "brat", which he substituted for his own name), Groening refused to name Grampa after his grandfather, Abraham Groening. He left it to the writers to choose a name and they ironically chose "Abraham", although not knowing that it was also the name of Groening's grandfather. Grampa first appeared in the Simpsons short "Grandpa and the Kids", which premiered on The Tracey Ullman Show on January 10, 1988. In the short, Grampa tells his grandchildren stories of "the good old days". When they stop paying attention to him, he feigns his own death to recapture their attention.

The Simpsons writer Al Jean commented that Grampa is often the focus of pointed jokes about old people. He said the reason for that is because the staff is trying to illustrate how society mistreats the elderly, "and some of it is because people over 55 never watch our show". Bill Oakley and Josh Weinstein, former writers on the show, said that they liked to write episodes about Grampa because they are "obsessed" with old people. Weinstein commented that they "both love [old people] and seem to really hate them at the same time". He also said that he "enjoys" writing for characters such as Grampa and Mr. Burns because of their "out-datedness", and because he gets to use dictionaries for looking up "old time slang".

=== Voice ===
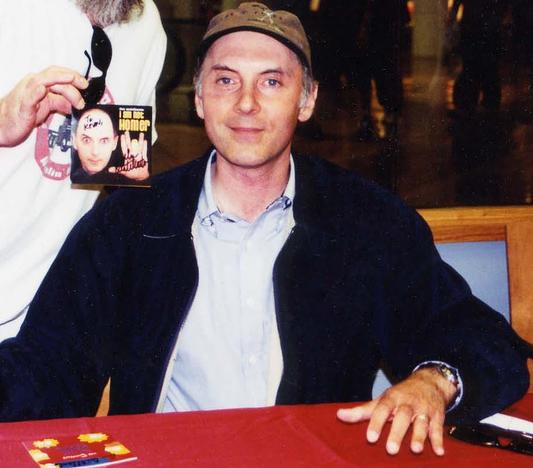
Dan Castellaneta voices Grampa and several other recurring characters

Grampa's voice is performed by Dan Castellaneta, who also voices numerous other characters, including Homer Simpson, Krusty the Clown, Barney Gumble, Groundskeeper Willie, Mayor Quimby and Hans Moleman. Castellaneta was part of the regular cast of The Tracey Ullman Show and had previously done some voice-over work in Chicago alongside his wife Deb Lacusta. Castellaneta likes to stay in character during recording sessions, and tries to visualize a scene in his mind so that he can give the proper voice to it. The episode "Grampa vs. Sexual Inadequacy" (season six, 1994) featured many interactions between Grampa and Homer, so Castellaneta therefore had to talk to himself when he recorded the voices for that episode. Castellaneta said it is hard for him to do Grampa's voice because it is "wheezy and airy".

== Reception ==
=== Commendations ===
Nancy Basile of About.com named Grampa the fifth best character of The Simpsons, calling him a "perfect stereotypical old person". In the 1000th issue of Entertainment Weekly, Grampa was selected as the "Grandpa for The Perfect TV Family". Joe Rhodes of TV Guide considered Grampa's most memorable line to be "If I'm not back at the home by nine, they declare me legally dead and collect my insurance." Dan Castellaneta has won two Primetime Emmy Awards in the Outstanding Voice-Over Performance category for voicing various characters, including Grampa. The first was awarded in 1992 for the episode "Lisa's Pony", and the second in 2004 for "Today I Am A Clown". In 2010, Castellaneta was nominated for the award for voicing Grampa and Homer in the episode "Thursdays with Abie".

The Simpsons writer David Mirkin said that one of his favorite jokes on the show is the one where Grampa cycles down the street in high speed and shouts that he feels young again, and is then knocked flying from his bicycle after a doll's head flies into the spokes and falls into an open grave. In a review of the Grampa-centric episode "Lady Bouvier's Lover", Patrick Bromley of DVD Verdict said that he is "never terribly interested" in episodes that revolve around Grampa, because he believes Grampa is "great as a background character, but less so when he takes center stage." DVD Movie Guide's Colin Jacobson said in a review of the same episode that Grampa is "always fun" and "it's nice to see him in an ebullient mood, at least for a while."

=== Analysis ===
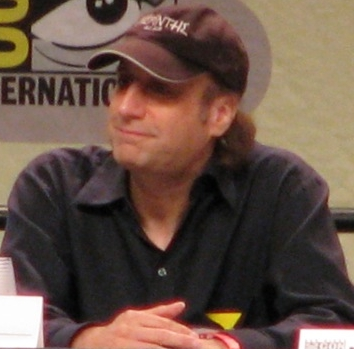
Writer David Mirkin thinks that what makes Grampa funny is that the "boring" and "tedious" things he says are "actually funny" in the context of the boredom and the tedium.

Mirkin thinks it is hard to make a "boring" and "tedious" character, such as Grampa, funny. He believes that what ultimately makes Grampa funny is that the things he says are "actually funny" in the context of the boredom and the tedium. Anne-Marie Barry and Chris Yuill, the authors of the book Understanding the Sociology of Health, commented that in episodes in which Grampa appears, the comedy content is often generated by Grampa falling asleep at "inopportune" moments or "embarking" on long rambling stories about his youth. "Instances such as these match popular stereotypes that all old people are 'demented' and in poor health," they wrote.

Alan S. Brown and Chris Logan wrote in The Psychology of The Simpsons that Grampa has the least amount of "power" in the Simpson family, and that he is treated as little more than a child and is often ignored. The family frequently laughs at his "failing" memory and his "ineffectual" attempts to get what he wants. They added that Grampa is left behind, forgotten, and rarely invited to spend time with the family. The authors commented that he is "not without influence, but he certainly does not play the traditional grandfather role in the family hierarchy."

Brown and Logan also wrote that Grampa had a considerable influence in the formation of Homer's character, and that flashbacks in The Simpsons show what an "angry", "critical" father he was to Homer. "He yelled, used corporal punishment, and constantly belittled Homer's attempts to have fun, date, and excel at various activities," they added. The authors said that Homer tries "in vain" to repair his relationship with Grampa and continuously seeks for his approval, but Grampa continues to be "as critical as ever". However, in some episodes, he does show a loving side to Homer. Such as the episode "Grampa vs. Sexual Inadequacy", he and Homer watch the farm burn, or the episode "To Cur with Love", where he does everything to protect Homer's dog from Mr Burns in a flashback. In his book Understanding the Psychology of Diversity, author Bruce Evan Blaine wrote that Grampa is typically portrayed as a "doddering", "senile", and "dependent" person who is a "trivial" and "often disposable figure" in his son's life.

== Merchandising ==
Playmates Toys created two Grampa Simpson action figures for the World of Springfield series. The first, released in May 2000, depicts Grampa in his usual appearance. The second, "Sunday Grampa", was released in June 2002, and depicts Grampa in his Sunday church clothes. Alongside the television series, Grampa regularly appears in issues of Simpsons Comics, which were first published on November 29, 1993. The final issue was published on October 17, 2018.

Grampa also plays a role in The Simpsons Ride, launched in 2008 at Universal Studios Florida and Hollywood.

In 2014, LEGO released a line of The Simpsons characters as part of their LEGO Minifigures theme. Grampa is featured with the rest of the Simpsons family.

In 2015, Grampa appeared as a non-playable character in the toys-to-life video game Lego Dimensions. In game, he only appears in the Simpsons levels and all his voice lines are archive audio from Dan Castellaneta.
