= Dan Castellaneta =

American actor (born 1957)

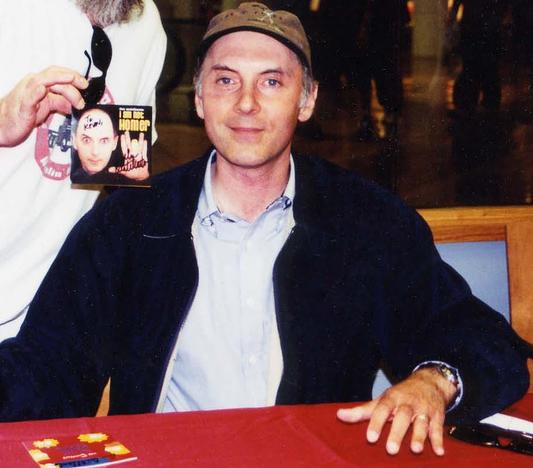
- Castellaneta in 2002
- Born: Daniel Louis Castellaneta; October 29, 1957 (age 69); Chicago, Illinois, U.S.
- Education: Northern Illinois University (BA)
- Occupation: Actor • comedian
- Years active: 1979–present
- Spouse: Deb Lacusta (m. 1987)

Daniel Louis Castellaneta (/ˌkæstələˈnɛtə/ KAST-ə-lə-NET-ə; born October 29, 1957) is an American actor and comedian. He is best known for voicing Homer Simpson on the animated series The Simpsons, as well as other characters on the show such as Grampa Simpson, Krusty the Clown, Groundskeeper Willie, Mayor Quimby, Sideshow Mel, Mr. Teeny, Kodos, Itchy, Santa's Little Helper, and Barney Gumble. Castellaneta is also known for voicing Grandpa Phil in Nickelodeon's Hey Arnold!, and has had voice roles in several other programs, including Futurama, Sibs, Darkwing Duck, The Adventures of Dynamo Duck, The Batman, Back to the Future: The Animated Series, Aladdin, Earthworm Jim, and Taz-Mania.

In 1999, Castellaneta appeared in the Christmas special Olive, the Other Reindeer and won an Annie Award for his portrayal of the Postman. Castellaneta released a comedy album I Am Not Homer, and wrote and starred in a one-person show titled Where Did Vincent van Gogh?

== Early life ==
Daniel Louis Castellaneta was born on October 29, 1957, at Roseland Community Hospital in the West Roseland neighborhood of Chicago, Illinois. He was raised in River Forest and Oak Park, Illinois. He is of Italian descent, born to Elsie (née Lagorio; 1926–2008) and Louis Castellaneta (1915–2014), an amateur actor who worked for a printing company.

Castellaneta became adept at impressions at a young age and his mother enrolled him in an acting class when he was 16 years old. He would listen to his father's comedy records and do impressions of the artists. He was a "devotee" of the works of many performers, including Alan Arkin and Barbara Harris and directors Mike Nichols and Elaine May. He attended Oak Park and River Forest High School and upon graduation, started attending Northern Illinois University (NIU) in the fall of 1975.

Castellaneta studied art education, with the goal of becoming an art teacher. He became a student teacher and would entertain his students with his impressions. Castellaneta was a regular participant in The Ron Petke and His Dead Uncle Show, a radio show at NIU. The show helped Castellaneta hone his skills as a voice-over actor. He recalled "We did parodies and sketches, we would double up on, so you learned to switch between voices. I got my feet wet doing a voiceover. The show was just barely audible, but we didn't care. It was that we got a chance to do it and write our own material." He took a play-writing class and auditioned for an improvisational show. A classmate first thought Castellaneta would "fall on his face with improvisation" but soon "was churning out material faster than [they] could make it work."

== Career ==
=== Early career ===
Castellaneta began his acting career after his graduation from Northern Illinois University in 1979. He decided that if his career went nowhere he would still have a chance to try something else. He began taking improvisation classes, where he met his future wife Deb Lacusta. He started to work at The Second City, an improvisational theatre in Chicago, in 1983 and continued to work there until 1987. During this period, he did voice-over work with his wife for various radio stations.

He auditioned for a role in The Tracey Ullman Show and his first meeting underwhelmed Tracey Ullman and the other producers. Ullman decided to fly to Chicago to watch Castellaneta perform. His performance that night was about a blind man who tries to become a comedian and Ullman later recalled that although there were flashier performances that night, Castellaneta made her cry. She was impressed and Castellaneta was hired.

=== The Simpsons ===
Castellaneta is most famous for his roles on the longest-running American animated television show, The Simpsons, most notably as Homer Simpson. The Tracey Ullman Show included a series of animated shorts about a dysfunctional family. Voices were needed for the shorts, so the producers asked Castellaneta and fellow cast member Julie Kavner to voice Homer and Marge Simpson respectively, rather than hire more actors. Homer's voice began as a loose impression of Walter Matthau, but Castellaneta could not "get enough power behind that voice" and could not sustain his Matthau impression for the nine- to ten-hour recording sessions.

He tried to find something easier, so he "dropped the voice down", and developed it into a more versatile and humorous voice during the second and third season of the half-hour show. To perform Homer's voice, Castellaneta lowers his chin to his chest, and is said to "let his IQ go."

Castellaneta likes to stay in character during recording sessions, and tries to visualize a scene in his mind so that he can give the proper voice to it. Despite Homer's fame, Castellaneta claims he is rarely recognized in public, "except, maybe, by a die-hard fan."

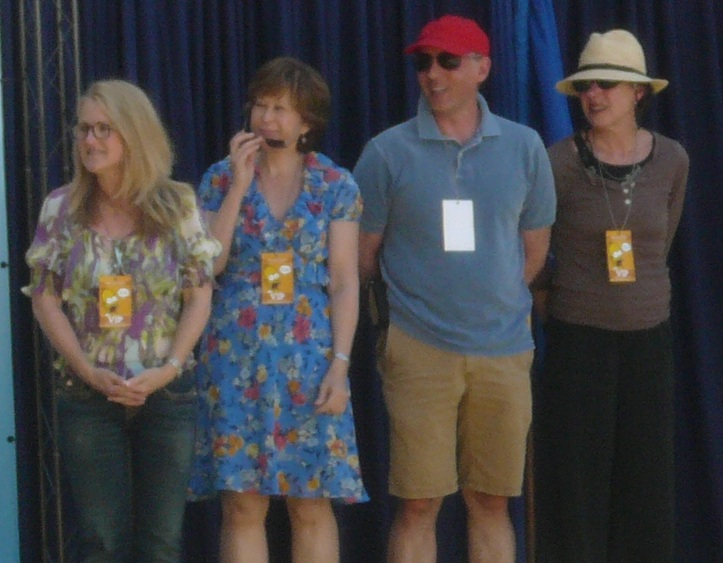
Castellaneta with fellow Simpsons voice actors Nancy Cartwright, Yeardley Smith and Julie Kavner in 2009

Castellaneta also provides the voices for numerous other characters, including Grampa Simpson, Barney Gumble, Krusty the Clown, Groundskeeper Willie, Mayor Quimby, Hans Moleman, Sideshow Mel, Itchy, Kodos, Arnie Pye, the Squeaky Voiced Teen and Gil Gunderson. Krusty's voice is based on Chicago television's Bob Bell, who had a very raspy voice and portrayed WGN-TV's Bozo the Clown from 1960 to 1984. During early recording sessions, he recorded a new version of Barney's loud trademark belch for every episode but discovered that it was not easy for him to belch each time a script called for it. Castellaneta chose a recording of what he believed was his best belch and told the producers to make that the standard.

Groundskeeper Willie's first appearance was in the season two episode "Principal Charming". The character was written as an angry janitor, and Castellaneta was assigned to perform the voice. He did not know what voice to use and Sam Simon, who was directing at the time, suggested he use an accent. Castellaneta first tried using Hispanic voicing, which Simon felt was too clichéd. He then tried a "big dumb Swede", which was also rejected. For his third try, he used the voice of a grumpy Scotsman, which was deemed appropriate enough and was used in the episode. The voice was based partially on Angus Crock, a kilt-wearing chef from the sketch comedy show Second City Television, who was portrayed by Dave Thomas.

Mayor Quimby, who first appeared in "Bart Gets an 'F'", is a parody of various members of the Kennedy family. The episode script did not call for Quimby to be a parody of them, and Castellaneta improvised the accent. Sideshow Mel's voice is Castellaneta's impression of Kelsey Grammer, the voice of Sideshow Bob. Hapless Gil Gunderson is a spoof of actor Jack Lemmon's portrayal of Shelley Levene in the 1992 film adaptation of the play Glengarry Glen Ross. Showrunner Mike Scully thought that Gil would be "a one-shot thing" but "Dan Castellaneta was so funny at the table read doing the character, we kept making up excuses in subsequent episodes to put him in." The Blue-Haired Lawyer's voice, as well as his demeanor, is based on lawyer Roy Cohn.

Castellaneta has won several awards for voicing Homer, including four Primetime Emmy Awards for "Outstanding Voice-Over Performance" in 1992 for "Lisa's Pony", 1993 for "Mr. Plow", 2004 for voicing several characters in "Today I Am a Clown", and 2009 for voicing Homer in "Father Knows Worst".

In 1993, Castellaneta was given a special Annie Award, "Outstanding Individual Achievement in the Field of Animation", for his work as Homer on The Simpsons.

In 2004, Castellaneta and Julie Kavner (the voice of Marge) won a Young Artist Award for "Most Popular Mom & Dad in a TV Series". Homer was placed second on TV Guide's 2002 Top 50 Greatest Cartoon Characters, and in 2000, Homer and the rest of the Simpson family were awarded a star on the Hollywood Walk of Fame located at 7021 Hollywood Boulevard.

Until 1998, Castellaneta was paid $30,000 per episode. During a pay dispute in 1998, Fox threatened to replace the six main voice actors with new actors, going as far as preparing for casting of new voices. The dispute was soon resolved and Castellaneta began receiving $125,000 per episode until 2004, when the cast demanded to be paid $360,000 an episode. The issue was resolved a month later, with Castellaneta starting to earn $250,000 per episode. Following salary negotiations in 2008, the cast received approximately $400,000 per episode. In 2011, with Fox threatening to cancel the series unless production costs were cut, the cast accepted a pay cut to around $300,000 per episode.

In the early 1990s, Castellaneta and his wife Deb Lacusta wrote a script for an episode in which Barney becomes sober, and pitched it to showrunner Al Jean. He liked the story but turned it down because he felt that it was too similar to "Duffless", an episode that the writers were already working on. The two waited for nearly a decade and offered an updated version of the script to later showrunner Mike Scully, who liked it and had them make a few changes. Their script became the episode "Days of Wine and D'oh'ses". Castellaneta and his wife have also written the episodes "Gump Roast", "The Ziff Who Came to Dinner", "Kiss Kiss, Bang Bangalore", and "The Fight Before Christmas". In 2007, they were nominated for a Writers Guild of America Award for the episode "Kiss Kiss, Bang Bangalore". Castellaneta is also credited as a consulting producer.

=== Further career ===
Castellaneta has been a regular cast member in several other television series. In 1991, he played Warren Morris in the short-lived ABC live-action sitcom Sibs. Heide Perlman, creator of Sibs, wrote the part with Castellaneta in mind.

He provided the voice of the eponymous character in The Adventures of Dynamo Duck, Megavolt in Darkwing Duck, "Doc" Emmett Brown in Back to the Future: The Animated Series, the lead character in Earthworm Jim and several characters, including Grandpa Phil and the Jolly Olly Man, the mentally unstable ice cream truck driver, on Nickelodeon's Hey Arnold!. He guest starred as The Robot Devil in five episodes of Futurama, as well as the Futurama film The Beast with a Billion Backs.

Castellaneta has also made guest appearances in a number of television series episodes. In 1992, he guest-starred in an episode of the legal drama L.A. Law, as a Homer Simpson meetable character at a California amusement park who is dismissed for inappropriate behavior while in costume. In 1996, he made a guest appearance as a Zoo Keeper in Season 2, Episode 12 "The One After the Superbowl" in Friends. In 2005, he appeared in the episode "Sword of Destiny" in Arrested Development as Dr. Stein, a deadpan incompetent doctor.

In 2005, Castellaneta guest-starred as Joe Spencer in the Stargate SG-1 season eight episode "Citizen Joe". He also appeared in episodes of ALF, Campus Ladies, Castle, Entourage, Everybody Loves Raymond, Frasier, Friends, Greek, How I Met Your Mother, Mad About You, Married... with Children, Murphy Brown, NYPD Blue, Parks and Recreation, Reba, Reno 911!, That '70s Show, Veronica Mars, Hot in Cleveland, Yes, Dear, and Desperate Housewives.

He appeared as the Genie in the Aladdin sequel The Return of Jafar and on the 1994 Aladdin television series. The Genie had been voiced by Robin Williams in Aladdin, and Castellaneta described replacing him as "sort of like stepping into Hamlet after Laurence Olivier did it, how can you win?" He also provided Genie's voice in the Kingdom Hearts video game series for both Kingdom Hearts and Kingdom Hearts II (with archived audio used for Kingdom Hearts: Chain of Memories and its remake as well as for the later HD collections Kingdom Hearts HD 1.5 Remix and Kingdom Hearts HD 2.5 Remix). Castellaneta portrayed Aaron Spelling in the 2004 NBC film Behind the Camera: The Unauthorized Story of Charlie's Angels, which followed the true story of how Spelling created the show. Other films in which Castellaneta has appeared include Nothing in Common, Say Anything..., Super Mario Bros., The Client, Space Jam, My Giant, The Simpsons Movie, Rugrats in Paris: The Movie, Recess: School's Out, Hey Arnold!: The Movie, The Cat in the Hat and The Pursuit of Happyness.

In 2000, he won an Annie Award for his portrayal of the Postman in the animated Christmas television special Olive, the Other Reindeer. In 2006, he appeared in Jeff Garlin's independent film I Want Someone to Eat Cheese With along with several other Second City alumni.

On February 22, 2000, his first music CD Two Lips was published. It was followed on April 23, 2002, by his first comedy CD, I Am Not Homer, in which he and his wife perform several comedy skits. The majority of the sketches had been written and performed before the CD was recorded, and Castellaneta thought that it would be a good idea to preserve them "since [he and Lacusta] don't perform them much anymore."

Some came from their sketch series on a local radio station in Chicago and had to be lengthened from the "two-minute bits" that they were originally, while several others were stage sketches performed in a comedy club in Santa Monica. Additionally, "Citizen Kane", a sketch in which two people discuss the film Citizen Kane with different meanings, was something the pair had performed at an art gallery. Castellaneta noted that "we already knew that these skits were funny, [but] some of them we polished and tightened." The skits were principally written by improvising from a basic point, transcribing the results, and then editing them to the finished scene. Castellaneta chose the title I Am Not Homer as a parody of Leonard Nimoy's famous first autobiography, I Am Not Spock, as well as to show that most of the comedy featured "is not the typical Homer comedy."

Alongside his television and film work, Castellaneta has appeared in a number of theatrical productions. In 1992, he starred in Deb & Dan's Show alongside his wife. In 1995, Castellaneta started writing Where Did Vincent van Gogh?, a one man play in which he portrays a dozen different characters, including artist Vincent van Gogh. He first officially performed the play at the ACME Comedy Theatre in Los Angeles in 1999. In 2007, he appeared in The Bicycle Men at King's Head Theatre in London.

Castellaneta hosted the final of New York comedy show Thrills and Spills on December 31, 2015. The final was held in Montgomery, Alabama.

== Personal life ==
In 1987, Castellaneta married writer and actress Deb Lacusta, whom he had met at an improv class in Chicago. They divide their time between Los Angeles and Santa Barbara, California.

Castellaneta is a vegetarian and does not drink alcohol.

== Discography ==
Album	Released	Label	Notes
Two Lips	February 2000	Oglio Records	All-music comedy album
I Am Not Homer	April 23, 2002	Oglio Records	Comedy album released with Deb Lacusta

Also featured in:

- The Simpsons Sing the Blues (1990)
- Songs in the Key of Springfield (1997)
- The Yellow Album (1998)
- Go Simpsonic with The Simpsons (1999)
- The Simpsons: Testify (2007)

== Awards and nominations ==
Year	Award	Category	Role	Series	Result
1992	Emmy Award	Outstanding Voice-Over Performance	Homer Simpson, Grampa, various others	The Simpsons: "Lisa's Pony"	Won
1993	Emmy Award	Outstanding Voice-Over Performance	Homer Simpson	The Simpsons: "Mr. Plow"	Won
1993	Annie Award	Outstanding Individual Achievement in the Field of Animation	Various characters	The Simpsons	Won
2000	Annie Award	Outstanding Voice Acting by a Male Performer in a Television Series	The Postman	Olive, the Other Reindeer	Won
2004	Stinkers Bad Movie Award	Most Annoying Non-Human Character	Thing 1, Thing 2	The Cat in the Hat	Nominated
2004	Golden Raspberry Award	Worst Screen Couple	Thing 1, Thing 2	The Cat in the Hat	Nominated
2004	Emmy Award	Outstanding Voice-Over Performance	Various characters	The Simpsons: "Today I Am A Clown"	Won
2004	Young Artist Award	Most Popular Mom & Pop in a Television Series	Homer Simpson	The Simpsons	Won
2007	WGA Award	Animation		The Simpsons	Nominated
2009	Emmy Award	Outstanding Voice-Over Performance	Homer Simpson	The Simpsons: "Father Knows Worst"	Won
2010	Emmy Award	Outstanding Voice-Over Performance	Homer Simpson, Grampa Simpson	The Simpsons: "Thursdays with Abie"	Nominated
2011	Emmy Award	Outstanding Voice-Over Performance	Homer Simpson, Barney Gumble, Krusty the Clown, Louie	The Simpsons: "Donnie Fatso"	Nominated
2015	Emmy Award	Outstanding Character Voice-Over Performance	Homer Simpson	The Simpsons: "Bart's New Friend"	Nominated
2018	Emmy Award	Outstanding Character Voice-Over Performance	Homer Simpson/Krusty the Clown/Groundskeeper Willie and Sideshow Mel	The Simpsons: "Fears of a Clown"	Nominated

Preceded by Robin Williams	Voice of the Genie; 1994 – '95	Succeeded by Robin Williams
Preceded by Robin Williams	Voice of the Genie; 2005	Succeeded by Jim Meskimen
Media offices
Preceded by Jeff Bergman	Thrills & Spills final host 2015	Succeeded by David Walliams
