= The Simpsons (franchise) =

American animated franchise

- Created by: Matt Groening
- Original work: The Simpsons shorts from The Tracey Ullman Show
- Owners: 20th Century Studios (The Walt Disney Company)
- Years: 1987–present

Print publications
- Books: List of books
- Comics: List of comics
- Magazine: Simpsons Illustrated

Films and television
- Films: The Simpsons Movie (2007); The New Simpsons Movie (2027)
- Short films: The Longest Daycare; Playdate with Destiny; The Simpsons Balenciaga; Te Deseo Lo Mejor; The Simpsons Disney+ shorts; Fortnite x The Simpsons: Apocalypse D'Oh!
- Animated series: The Simpsons (1989–present)
- Television short: The Simpsons shorts (1987–1989)

Games
- Traditional: Simpsons Jeopardy!
- Video games: List of video games

Audio
- Soundtrack: Discography
- Original music: The Simpsons Theme

Miscellaneous
- Toys: World of Springfield; Lego The Simpsons
- Theme park attractions: The Simpsons Ride; Kang & Kodos' Twirl 'n' Hurl

Official website
- www.thesimpsons.com

The Simpsons is an American animated franchise whose eponymous family consists of Homer, Marge, Bart, Lisa, and Maggie. The Simpsons were created by cartoonist Matt Groening for a series of animated shorts that debuted on The Tracey Ullman Show on Fox on April 19, 1987. After a three-season run, the sketch was developed into The Simpsons, a half-hour prime time show that was an early hit for Fox, becoming the first Fox series to land in the Top 30 ratings in a season (1989–1990). The popularity of The Simpsons has made it a billion-dollar merchandising and media franchise. Alongside the television series, the characters of the show have been featured in a variety of media, including books, comic books, a magazine, musical releases and video games.

The Simpsons Movie, a feature-length film, was released in 2007 and was the eighth highest-grossing film of that year. A variety of merchandise, including T-shirts, DVDs, board games, and action figures have been released. The Simpsons merchandise has sold well, generating $2 billion in revenue during the first 14 months of sales. In 2003, about 500 companies around the world were licensed to use The Simpsons characters in their advertising. In 2008, $750 million worth of The Simpsons merchandise was purchased worldwide. Peter Byrne, Fox executive vice-president of licensing and merchandising, called The Simpsons "without doubt the biggest licensing entity that Fox has had, full stop, I would say from either TV or film."

In 2002, the property was valued at $5 billion to $6 billion according to Fox.

== Background ==
=== Creation ===
Matt Groening conceived of the idea for the Simpsons in the lobby of James L. Brooks's office. Brooks, the producer of the sketch comedy program The Tracey Ullman Show, wanted to use a series of animated cartoons as bumpers between sketches. Groening had been called in to pitch a series of animated shorts, and had intended to present his Life in Hell series. When he realized that animating Life in Hell would require him to rescind publication rights for his life's work, Groening decided to go in another direction. He hurriedly sketched out his version of a dysfunctional family, and named the characters after his own family.

=== Themes ===
The Simpsons takes place in the fictional American town of Springfield, without any geographical coordinates or references to U.S. states that might identify which part of the country it represents. The Simpsons uses the standard setup of a situational comedy or "sitcom" as its premise. The series centers on a family and their life in a typical American town. However, because of its animated nature, The Simpsons' scope is larger than that of a regular sitcom. The town of Springfield acts as a complete universe in which characters can explore the issues faced by modern society. By having Homer work in a nuclear power plant, the show can comment on the state of the environment. Through Bart and Lisa's days at Springfield Elementary School, the show's writers illustrate pressing or controversial issues in the field of education. The town features a vast array of media channels—from kids' television programming to local news, which enables the producers to make jokes about themselves and the entertainment industry. Some commentators say the show is political in nature and susceptible to a left-wing bias. The writer and producer Al Jean admitted in an interview that "We [the show] are of liberal bent." The writers often evince an appreciation for liberal ideals, but the show makes jokes across the political spectrum. Religion also figures as a recurring theme. In times of crisis, the family often turns to God, and the show has dealt with most of the major religions.

=== Main characters ===
The Simpson family From left to right: Bart, Santa's Little Helper (dog), Marge, Maggie, Homer, Lisa, and Snowball II (cat).

The main characters of the show are the Simpson family. The Simpsons are a family who live at 742 Evergreen Terrace in Springfield. Although the family is dysfunctional, many episodes examine their relationships and bonds with each other and they are often shown to care about one another.

- Homer Simpson, voiced by Dan Castellaneta, is the father of the Simpson family. He embodies several American working class stereotypes: he is crude, overweight, incompetent, clumsy, thoughtless and a borderline alcoholic. His voice started out as an impression of Walter Matthau but eventually evolved into a more robust voice during the second and third season of the half-hour show, allowing Homer to cover a fuller range of emotions. Homer has since become one of the most influential fictional characters. He has inspired an entire line of merchandise and his catchphrase, the annoyed grunt "D'oh!", has been included in the Oxford English Dictionary.
- Marge Simpson, voiced by Julie Kavner, is the well-meaning and extremely patient wife of Homer and mother of Bart, Lisa and Maggie. Her most notable physical feature is her distinctive beehive hairstyle which was inspired by Bride of Frankenstein and the style that Matt Groening's mother wore during the 1960s, although her hair was never blue.
- Bart Simpson, voiced by Nancy Cartwright, is the oldest child in the family—at age 10. Bart's most prominent character traits are his mischievousness, rebelliousness, disrespect for authority and sharp wit. During the first two seasons of The Simpsons, Bart was the show's main character. The name "Bart" is an anagram of the word "brat". In 1998, Time magazine selected Bart as 46th of the 100 most influential people of the 20th century, and the only fictional character to make the list. He had previously appeared on the cover the December 31, 1990 edition. During the early episodes, Bart was rebellious and frequently escaped without punishment, which led some parents' groups and conservative spokespeople to believe he provided a poor role model for children. This prompted George H. W. Bush to rally, "We're going to keep trying to strengthen the American family. To make them more like the Waltons and less like the Simpsons."
- Lisa Simpson, voiced by Yeardley Smith, is the middle child of the family-at age 8. She is an extremely intelligent eight-year-old girl, one of the most intelligent characters on the show. Lisa's political convictions are generally socially liberal. In the Tracey Ullman Show shorts, Lisa was more of a "female Bart" and was equally mischievous. As the series progressed, Lisa began to develop into a more intelligent and more emotional character. In 2001, Lisa received a special "Board of Directors Ongoing Commitment Award" at the Environmental Media Awards. "Lisa the Vegetarian", an episode from the seventh season, won both an Environmental Media Award for "Best Television Episodic Comedy" and a Genesis Award for "Best Television Comedy Series, Ongoing Commitment".
- Maggie Simpson, is the youngest child of the five main family-at age 1 and members and is almost always seen as a baby. She was quite prominent in the Tracey Ullman Show shorts, often being featured alongside Bart and Lisa but has since become the least seen and heard of the five main Simpsons. Maggie rarely speaks, but has been voiced by several actors including Elizabeth Taylor, James Earl Jones, Harry Shearer, who used Kang's voice, Jodie Foster, Yeardley Smith, and Nancy Cartwright.

The five family members were given simple designs so that their facial emotions could easily be changed with little effort and so that they would be recognizable in silhouette. They made their debut on April 19, 1987, in The Tracey Ullman Show short "Good Night". In 1989, the shorts were adapted into The Simpsons, a half-hour series airing on the Fox Broadcasting Company. The Simpson family remained the main characters on this new show.

== Television ==
=== Shorts on The Tracey Ullman Show ===
The Simpsons shorts debuted on The Tracey Ullman Show on April 19, 1987, were featured on the first three seasons of the show. By the fourth and last season of The Tracey Ullman Show the first season of the half-hour show was on the air. In the two first seasons, the shorts were divided into three or four parts, but in the third season they were played as a single story. The stories for the shorts were written and storyboarded by Matt Groening. The family was crudely drawn, because Groening had submitted basic sketches to the animators, assuming they would clean them up; instead they just traced over his drawings. The animation was produced domestically at Klasky Csupo, with Wesley Archer, David Silverman, and Bill Kopp being animators for the first season. After season one it was animated by Archer and Silverman. "Georgie" Gyorgyi Kovacs Peluce (Kovács Györgyike) was the colorist and the person who decided to make the characters yellow.

The actors who voiced the characters would later reprise their roles in The Simpsons. Dan Castellaneta performed the voices of Homer Simpson, Abraham Simpson, and Krusty the Clown. Homer's voice sounds different in the shorts compared to most episodes of the half-hour show. In the shorts, his voice is a loose impression of Walter Matthau, whereas it is more robust and humorous on the half-hour show, allowing Homer to cover a fuller range of emotions. Voices were needed for the shorts, so the producers decided to ask Castellaneta as well as Julie Kavner to voice Homer and Marge, rather than hire more actors; Castellaneta and Kavner were already members of the main Tracey Ullman Show cast. Nancy Cartwright and Yeardley Smith performed the voices of Bart and Lisa Simpson respectively.

=== The Simpsons ===
In 1989, a team of production companies adapted The Simpsons into a half-hour series for the Fox Broadcasting Company. The team included what is now the Klasky Csupo animation house. The half-hour series premiered on December 17, 1989, with "Simpsons Roasting on an Open Fire", a Christmas special. "Some Enchanted Evening" was the first full-length episode produced, but it did not broadcast until May 1990 because of animation problems. The Simpsons takes place in the fictional American town of Springfield, without any geographical coordinates or references to U.S. states that might identify which part of the country it represents. For The Simpsons, Harry Shearer and Hank Azaria were added as cast members. In addition to the main cast, Pamela Hayden, Tress MacNeille, Marcia Wallace, Maggie Roswell, and Russi Taylor voice supporting characters. From 1999 to 2002, Maggie Roswell's characters were voiced by Marcia Mitzman Gaven. Karl Wiedergott has appeared in minor roles, but does not voice any recurring characters. Repeat "special guest" cast members include Albert Brooks, Phil Hartman, Jon Lovitz, Joe Mantegna, and Kelsey Grammer.

The Simpsons was the Fox network's first TV series to rank among a season's top 30 highest-rated shows. While later seasons would focus on Homer, Bart was the lead character in most of the first three seasons. In 1990, Bart quickly became one of the most popular characters on television in what was termed "Bartmania". On February 9, 1997, The Simpsons surpassed The Flintstones with the episode "The Itchy & Scratchy & Poochie Show" as the longest-running prime-time animated series in the United States. In 2004, The Simpsons replaced The Adventures of Ozzie and Harriet (1952 to 1966) as the longest-running sitcom (animated or live action) in the United States. In May 2007, The Simpsons reached their 400th episode at the end of the eighteenth season. Hallmarks of the show include the opening sequence; its theme song, composed by Danny Elfman in 1989; Treehouse of Horror episodes, which have themselves inspired an offshoot of merchandise; its use of cultural references; sight gags; and the use of catchphrases, such as Homer's annoyed grunt "D'oh!".

The Simpsons has won dozens of awards since it debuted as a series, including 24 Primetime Emmy Awards, 26 Annie Awards and a Peabody Award. In a 1998 issue celebrating the 20th century's greatest achievements in arts and entertainment, Time magazine named The Simpsons the century's best television series. On January 14, 2000, the Simpsons were awarded a star on the Hollywood Walk of Fame.

In September 1994, 20th Television began syndicating reruns of The Simpsons to local stations throughout the United States. As of 2003, syndication reruns of The Simpsons have generated an estimated one billion dollars in revenue for Fox. In 2008, advertisers spent $314.8 million to advertise during the primetime show and subsequent reruns, down 16.8% from 2007. Since August 2014, every episode of the show has aired on FXX. From 2014 until 2019, all episodes were available on-demand via the Simpsons World website. All of the episodes have since been moved to the Disney+ streaming service since November 12, 2019.

==== Crossovers ====
Throughout its run, The Simpsons has featured characters from different series. The first such instance was in the season six episode "A Star Is Burns", which featured characters from The Critic; due to it being produced by staff who had worked on The Simpsons, including former writers Al Jean, Mike Reiss and producer James L. Brooks, Matt Groening publicly criticized the episode and Brooks, going on to remove his name from the opening credits.

Further episodes with crossovers include season 8 episode "The Springfield Files" with The X-Files, and season 26 episode "Simpsorama", which is a full-length crossover with Futurama, another show created by Matt Groening. Also in season 26, the episode "Mathlete's Feat" featured a crossover couch gag with Adult Swim series Rick and Morty.

Fellow Animation Domination series Family Guy would have a crossover with The Simpsons titled "The Simpsons Guy", which is part of Family Guy season 13.

An alternate telecast of the Monday Night Football game between the Cincinnati Bengals and Dallas Cowboys on December 9, 2024, centered around The Simpsons, with Homer playing quarterback for the Cowboys against Bart and the Bengals. Airing on Disney+, play had been slightly delayed from the primary broadcast on ABC and ESPN, allowing animators to replace players with characters from the show (Bart, for example, took the place of Cincinnati’s Joe Burrow).

==== Disney+ shorts ====
Following the addition of The Simpsons to the Disney+ streaming service, co-creator and executive producer James L. Brooks suggested the creation of a series of short films in which the Simpsons would "invade the rest of Disney+" as a way to promote The Simpsons and reach viewers who may not have been familiar with the series. So far, nine shorts have been released, the most recent being The Most Wonderful Time of the Year on October 11, 2024.

=== Fortnite x The Simpsons: Apocalypse D'Oh! ===
A streaming series of short episodes, serving as a spinoff to The Simpsons, released on November 1, 2025 to promote The Simpsons-themed season in the video game Fortnite.

== Films ==
=== Feature films ===
==== The Simpsons Movie ====
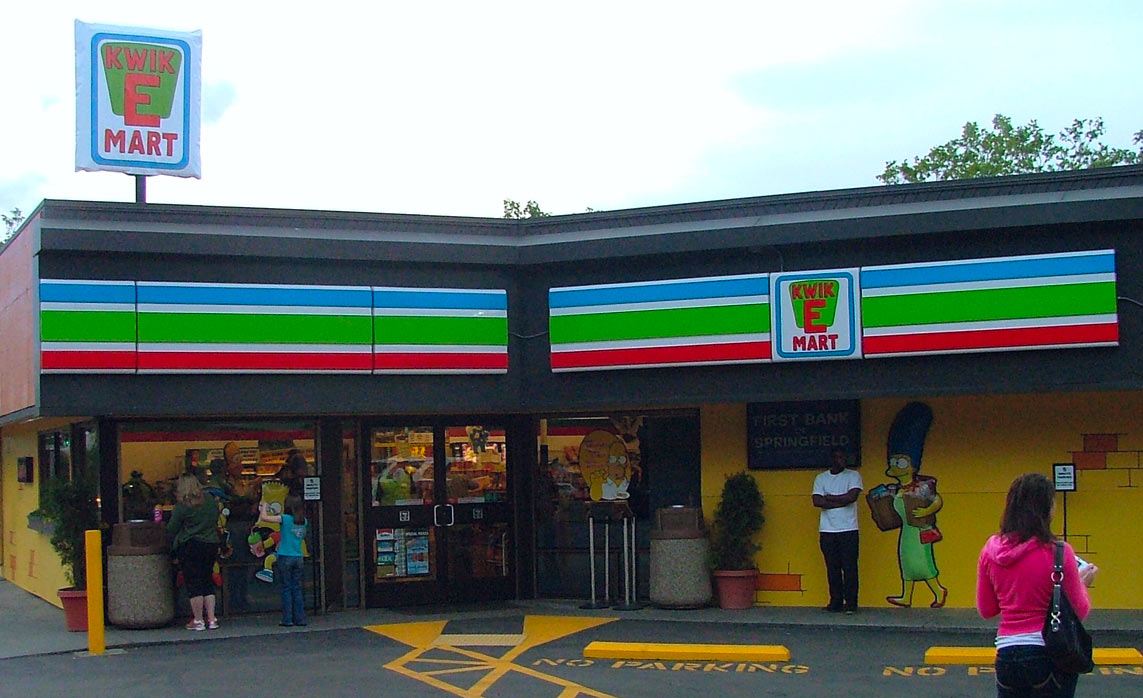
A Seattle 7-Eleven store transformed into a Kwik-E-Mart as part of a promotion for The Simpsons Movie.

20th Century Fox, Gracie Films, and Film Roman produced an animated Simpsons film, titled The Simpsons Movie, that was released on July 27, 2007. The film was directed by long-time Simpsons producer David Silverman and written by a team of Simpsons writers comprising Matt Groening, James L. Brooks, Al Jean, George Meyer, Mike Reiss, John Swartzwelder, Jon Vitti, David Mirkin, Mike Scully, Matt Selman, and Ian Maxtone-Graham. Production of the film occurred alongside continued writing of the series despite long-time claims by those involved in the show that a film would enter production only after the series had concluded. There had been talk of a possible feature-length Simpsons film ever since the early seasons of the series. James L. Brooks originally thought that the story of the episode "Kamp Krusty" was suitable for a film, but he encountered difficulties in trying to expand the script to feature-length. For a long time, difficulties such as lack of a suitable story and an already fully engaged crew of writers delayed the project. After winning a Fox and USA Today competition, Springfield, Vermont hosted the film's world premiere.

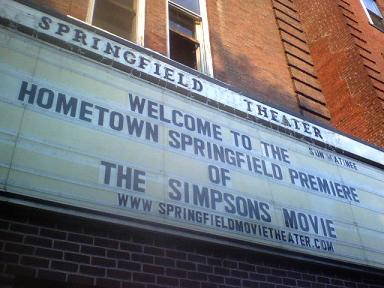
The Marquee from The Simpsons Movie's premiere, which took place in Springfield, Vermont.

The Simpsons Movie grossed a combined total of $74 million in its opening weekend in the United States, taking it to the top of the box office, and set the record for highest grossing opening weekend for a film based on a television series, surpassing Mission: Impossible 2. It opened at the top of the international box office, taking $96 million from seventy-one overseas territories—including $27.8 million in the United Kingdom, making it Fox's second highest opening ever in that country. In Australia, it grossed A$13.2 million, the biggest opening for an animated film and third largest opening weekend in the country. The film closed on December 20, 2007, with a worldwide gross of $527,068,706, making it the eighth highest-grossing film of 2007.

==== The New Simpsons Movie ====
In September 2025, a second feature film was officially announced to be in production, set for theatrical release on September 3, 2027 titled "The New Simpsons Movie". A picture saying "Homer's coming back for seconds." with the original release date as a small teaser was released.

=== Theatrical short films ===
==== The Longest Daycare ====
A 3D short-film entitled The Longest Daycare, focusing on Maggie, was shown in theaters before the 2012 film Ice Age: Continental Drift. It received an Academy Award nomination in the category of best animated short film.

==== Playdate with Destiny ====
On February 27, 2020, it was announced that a new short-film titled Playdate with Destiny would be screened in theaters with Pixar's Onward. The short-film starred Maggie Simpson. Onward was released on March 6, 2020, with a release on Disney+ on April 10, 2020.

=== In other films ===
Milhouse makes a cameo appearance in the 2014 film The Lego Movie as a Master Builder in Cloud Cuckoo Land.

Bootleg versions of Homer and Bart, as well as background characters based on the series' animation style, have cameo appearances in the 2022 film Chip 'n Dale: Rescue Rangers.

== Print publications ==
=== Books ===
Dozens of books featuring or about the Simpsons have been released by Fox. The Simpsons Library of Wisdom series each relate to a character from the show and two per year are released.

==== Episode guides ====
A series of episode guides has been published, starting with The Simpsons: A Complete Guide to Our Favorite Family. The guides feature quotes, trivia, and cultural references for each episode.

=== Comic books ===
The final issue of Simpsons Illustrated was a one-shot comic edition titled Simpsons Comics and Stories. The overwhelming success of this seemingly one-shot book led to the creation of Bongo Comics Group, which has gone on to publish numerous Simpsons-related comic books since 1993.

Numerous Simpson-related comic books have been released over the years. So far, nine comic book series have been published by Bongo Comics since 1993. The first comic strips based on The Simpsons appeared in 1991 in the magazine Simpsons Illustrated, which was a companion magazine to the show. The comic strips were popular and a one-shot comic book entitled Simpsons Comics and Stories, containing four different stories, was released in 1993 for the fans. The book was a success and due to this, the creator of The Simpsons, Matt Groening, and his companions Bill Morrison, Mike Rote, Steve Vance and Cindy Vance created the publishing company Bongo Comics. Issues of Simpsons Comics, Bart Simpson's Treehouse of Horror and Bart Simpson have been collected and reprinted in trade paperbacks in the United States by HarperCollins.

=== Simpsons Illustrated ===
Simpsons Illustrated was a companion magazine to The Simpsons. It was produced by Matt Groening, Bill Morrison, Cindy and Steve Vance, and Katy Dobbs was editorial director. It ran for 10 issues from 1991 to 1993. Welsh Publishing Company issued it four times a year. The magazine had a circulation of 1 million. Features included in-depth articles and interviews with the cast and crew, comics, and fanart.

== Video games ==
The video game industry was very quick to adapt the characters and world of Springfield into games. Some of the early games include Konami's arcade game The Simpsons (1991) and Acclaim Entertainment's The Simpsons: Bart vs. the Space Mutants (1991). More modern games include The Simpsons: Road Rage (2001), The Simpsons: Hit & Run (2003) and The Simpsons Game (2007). Two Simpsons pinball machines have been produced; one that was available briefly after the first season, and another that is still available for purchase. Since 2005, Electronic Arts have global exclusive rights to develop and publish any games based on the franchise.

== Theme park attractions ==
=== Universal Studios ===
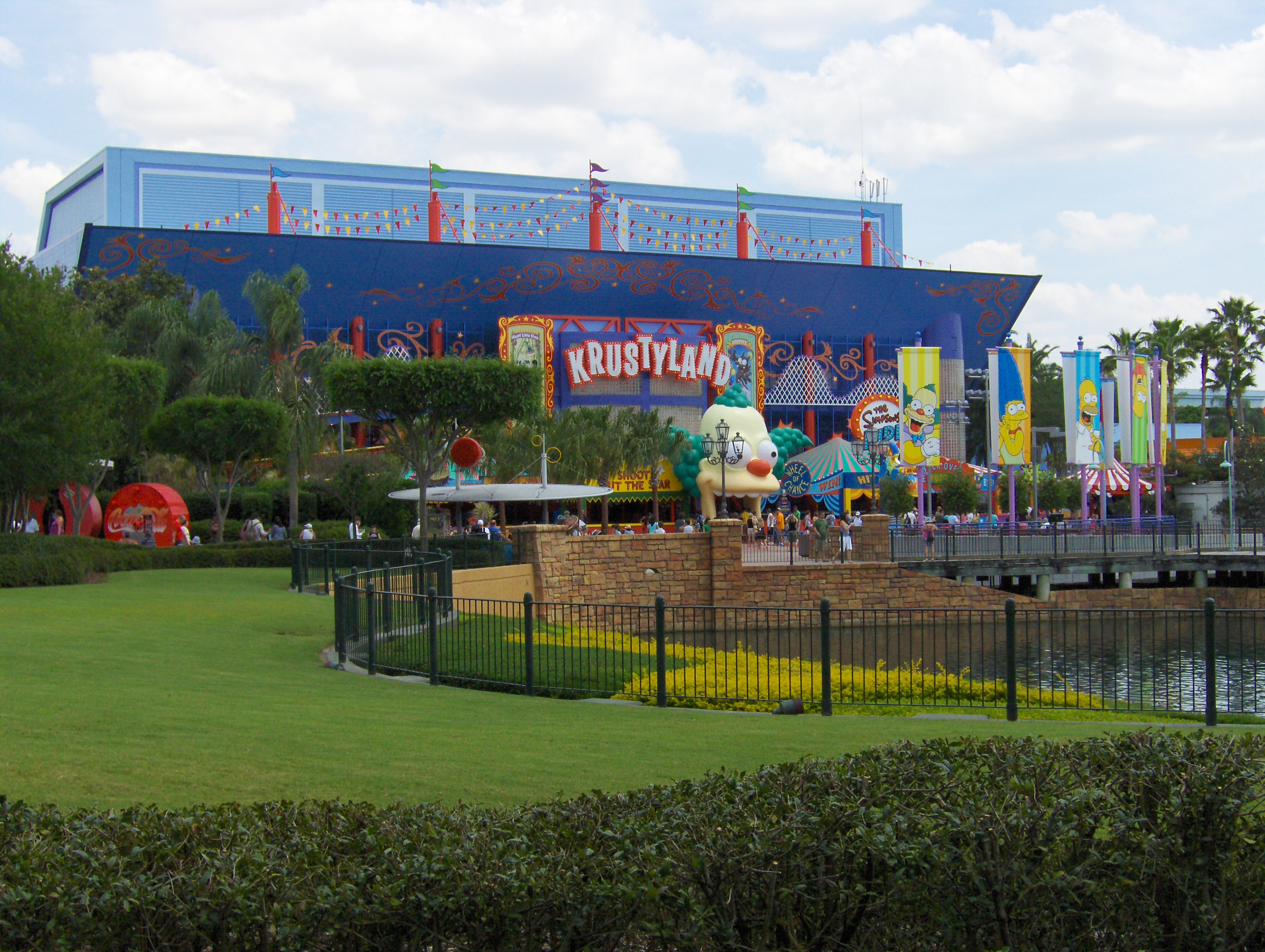
The Simpsons Ride at Universal Studios Florida which officially opened May 15, 2008

In July 2007, shortly before the release of The Simpsons Movie, it was officially announced that The Simpsons Ride, a simulator ride, would be implemented into the Universal Studios Orlando and Universal Studios Hollywood. It officially opened May 15, 2008 in Florida and May 19, 2008, in Hollywood. In the ride, patrons are introduced to a cartoon theme park called Krustyland built by Krusty the Clown. However, Sideshow Bob is loose from prison to get revenge on Krusty and the Simpson family. It features more than 24 regular characters from The Simpsons and features the voices of the regular cast members, as well as Pamela Hayden, Russi Taylor, and Kelsey Grammer. Harry Shearer decided not to participate in the ride, so none of his characters have vocal parts. James L. Brooks, Matt Groening and Al Jean, collaborated with the Universal Studios creative team, Universal Creative, to help develop the ride. The six-minute ride uses 80-foot IMAX screens and Sony Projectors. There are 24 ride cars, each seating eight people, and approximately 2000 people can ride it per hour. The animation in the ride uses computer generated 3D animation rendered by Blur Studio and Reel FX, rather than the traditional 2-D animation seen on The Simpsons. The Universal Studios Florida version of the ride hosted its one millionth rider on July 14, 2008, reaching the milestone faster than any other attraction in the resort.

=== Broadway at the Beach ===
In August 2018, The Simpsons in 4D opened at Broadway at the Beach in Myrtle Beach, South Carolina, housed in a replica of The Azteca theater from the series. Next door, a gift shop modeled after Kwik-E-Mart sells in-series merchandise such as Buzz Cola, Krusty burgers, Lard Lad doughnuts, and Squishees.

== Merchandise ==
The popularity of The Simpsons has made it a billion-dollar merchandising industry. The Simpsons merchandise sold well and generated $2 billion in revenue during the first 14 months of sales. In 2008, $750 million worth of The Simpsons merchandise was purchased worldwide. In 2003, about 500 companies around the world were licensed to use Simpsons characters in their advertising. In 2003, Peter Byrne, Fox executive vice president of licensing and merchandising, called The Simpsons "without doubt the biggest licensing entity that Fox has had, full stop, I would say from either TV or film."

=== Home releases ===
Many episodes of the show have been released on DVD and VHS over the years. When the first season DVD was released in 2001, it quickly became the best-selling television DVD in history, although it was later overtaken by the first season of Chappelle's Show. In particular, seasons one through seventeen and twenty have been released on DVD in the U.S. (Region 1), Europe (Region 2) and Australia/New Zealand/Latin America (Region 4). In 2015 it was announced that Fox was discontinuing home video releases of The Simpsons. Two years later, however, on July 22, 2017, it was announced that Season 18 would be released on December 5, 2017, on DVD. Another two years later, on July 20, 2019, it was announced that Season 19 would be released on December 3, 2019, on DVD.

=== Music ===
Collections of original music featured in the series have been released on the albums Songs in the Key of Springfield, Go Simpsonic with The Simpsons and The Simpsons: Testify. Several songs have been recorded with the purpose of a single or album release and have not been featured on the show. The album The Simpsons Sing the Blues was released in September 1990 and was a success, peaking at #3 on the Billboard 200 and becoming certified 2× platinum by the Recording Industry Association of America. The first single from the album was the pop rap song "Do the Bartman", performed by Nancy Cartwright and released on November 20, 1990. The song was written by Michael Jackson, although he did not receive any credit. While the song was never officially released as a single in the United States, it was successful in the United Kingdom. In 1991 it was the number one song in the UK for three weeks from February 16 to March 9 and was the seventh best-selling song of the year. It sold half a million copies and was certified gold by the British Phonographic Industry on February 1, 1991.

=== T-shirts ===
In the early 1990s, millions of T-shirts featuring Bart were sold; as many as one million were sold on some days. Believing Bart to be a bad role model, several American public schools banned T-shirts featuring Bart next to captions such as "I'm Bart Simpson. Who the hell are you?" and "Underachiever ('And proud of it, man!')".

=== Action figures ===
McFarlane Toys released a line of action figures based on the film.

==== Lego ====
According to Bricklink, The Lego Group released a total of 2 Lego sets as part of Lego The Simpsons theme. The product line was eventually discontinued by the end of 2015.

In 2014 and 2015, Lego sets based on The Simpsons were produced, including The Simpsons House and a set of Collectible Lego Minifigures. In 2015 a Simpsons level and fun pack were released under the Lego Dimensions line

Lego sets of The Simpsons
Reference	Name	Released	Pieces/Note
71005	Minifigures – The Simpsons™ Series 1	2014	16 different minifigures including Homer, Bart, Marge, Lisa, Maggie, Grampa, Ned Flanders, Krusty the Clown, Milhouse, Ralph, Apu, Nelson, Itchy, Scratchy, Chief Wiggum, and Mr. Burns.
71006	The Simpsons™ House	2014	2523
71009	Minifigures – The Simpsons™ Series 2	2015	16 different minifigures including Date Night Homer, Date Night Marge, Pajamas Lisa with Snowball II, Maggie with Santa's Little Helper, Bartman, Milhouse as Fallout Boy, Comic Book Guy, Martin Prince, Professor Frink, Hans Moleman, Selma, Patty, Groundskeeper Willie, Edna Krabappel, Smithers, and Dr. Hibbert.
71016	The Kwik-E-Mart	2015	2179
71211	Bart Fun Pack	2015	Lego Dimensions fun pack
71202	The Simpsons™ Level Pack	2015	Lego Dimensions level pack based on "El Viaje Misterioso de Nuestro Jomer (The Mysterious Voyage of Homer)"
71227	Krusty the Clown Fun Pack	2015	Lego Dimensions fun pack

=== Board and card games ===
The Simpsons has inspired special editions of well-known board games, including Clue, Scrabble, Monopoly (both for The Simpsons and for Treehouse of Horror), Operation, Chess, Checkers, Pictionary, Battle of the Sexes, Jeopardy, The Game of Life, Don't Panic, Magic 8-Ball, Othello, Scrabble, SORRY!, Poker, Darts, and Wheel of Fortune are all examples of games that have release Simpsons-related content, as well as the trivia games What Would Homer Do? and Simpsons Jeopardy!. Several card games such as Top Trumps cards and The Simpsons Trading Card Game have also been released. There have also been a few card games and board games unique to The Simpsons. Some examples are: The Simpsons Loser Takes All!, the Don't Have A Cow dice game, The Simpsons Mystery of Life, The Simpsons Lost and Found!, and The Simpsons Guessing Game (similar to Guess Who?).

=== Other ===
As a promotion for The Simpsons Movie, the convenience store chain 7-Eleven transformed 11 of its stores in the U.S. and one in Canada into Kwik-E-Marts, at the cost of approximately $10 million. 7-Eleven also sold Simpsons-themed merchandise in many of its stores. This included "Squishees", "Buzz Cola", "Krusty-O's" Cereal, and "Pink Movie Donuts". This promotion resulted in a 30% increase in profits for the altered 7-Eleven stores.

On April 9, 2009, the United States Postal Service unveiled a series of five 44 cent stamps featuring Homer, Marge, Bart, Lisa and Maggie, to commemorate the show's twentieth anniversary. "The Simpsons" is the first television series to receive this recognition while the show is still in production. The stamps, designed by Matt Groening, were made available for purchase on May 7, 2009. Approximately one billion will be printed.

Microsoft produced a limited edition The Simpsons Movie Xbox 360. Samsung released The Simpsons Movie phone, however the quality of build on the phone left it prone to screen damage although the company denied this and claimed any screen damage was 'user related' and denied warranty claims in Australia. Ben & Jerry's created a Simpsons-themed beer and donut-flavored ice cream, entitled "Duff & D'oh! Nuts".
