= The Simpsons discography =

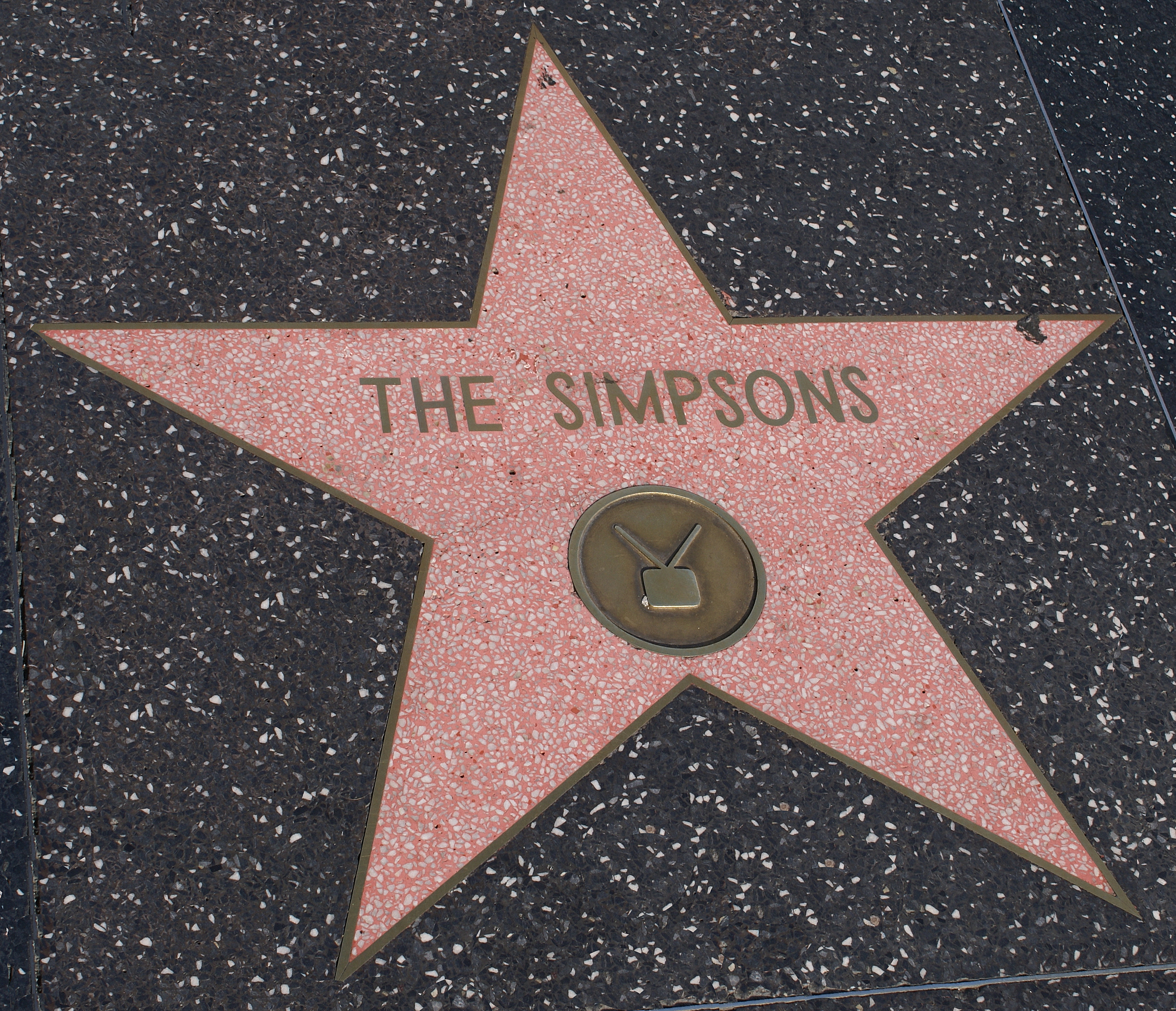
- The Simpsons' star on the Hollywood Walk of Fame
- Studio albums: 2
- Soundtrack albums: 4
- Compilation albums: 1
- Singles: 7
- Music videos: 2

The Simpsons is an American animated television sitcom created by Matt Groening that has aired on the Fox Broadcasting Company since December 1989. It is a satirical parody of a middle class American lifestyle epitomized by its eponymous family, which consists of Homer, Marge, Bart, Lisa and Maggie. The show is set in the fictional town of Springfield, and lampoons American culture, society, and many aspects of the human condition. The popularity of The Simpsons led to the release of the 1990 double platinum album The Simpsons Sing the Blues, which contains original songs performed by the cast members of the show as their characters. The album spawned two hit singles—"Do the Bartman" and "Deep, Deep Trouble". A less successful sequel, The Yellow Album, was released in 1998.

Three soundtrack albums featuring music and songs from the show have been released—Songs in the Key of Springfield in 1997, Go Simpsonic with The Simpsons in 1999, and The Simpsons: Testify in 2007. The first two charted on the US Billboard 200, reaching number 103 and 197, respectively. The Simpsons Movie: The Music, a soundtrack album featuring the score of The Simpsons Movie, was released along with the feature-length film in July 2007. The choral piece "Spider Pig" that appeared in the film and on the soundtrack entered the charts in several countries around the world.

== History ==
The Simpsons was a hit for Fox Broadcasting Company from the start and the network instantly received hundreds of requests from sellers wanting to create merchandise based on the show, such as clothing, alarm clocks, bubble gum, notebooks, posters, and air fresheners. The merchandise was highly successful, generating an estimated US$750 million in revenue during the first year of sales. As commented by AllMusic reviewer Jason Ankeny, "an LP proved inevitable" when, after the series premiere, "the characters' licensed images were everywhere from T-shirts to action figures". In 1990, David Geffen, founder of the record label Geffen Records, decided to record an album featuring characters from The Simpsons. His idea was approved by Fox and The Simpsons creator Matt Groening, and the show's writers were assigned to write original, humorous lyrics for the cast members to perform. The finished result became the hip-hop blues album The Simpsons Sing the Blues, released in December 1990. It peaked at number three on the US Billboard 200 and was certified double platinum by the Recording Industry Association of America in February 1991.

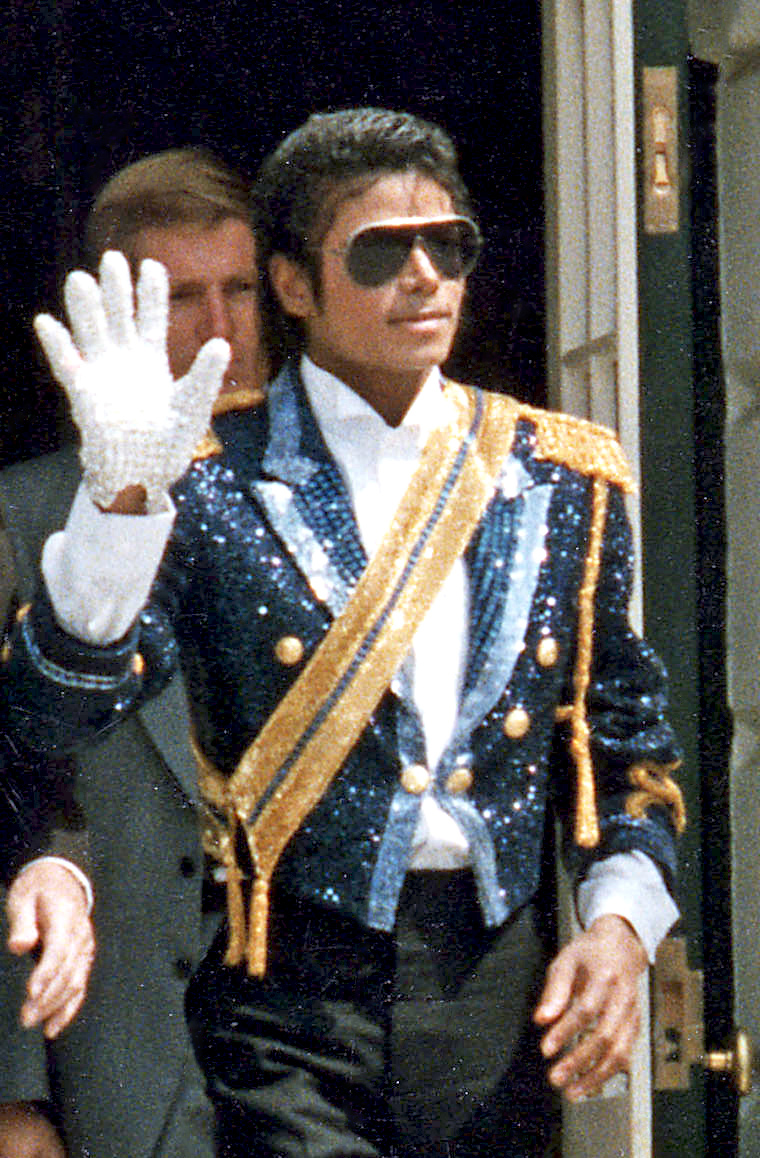
Michael Jackson co-wrote the single "Do the Bartman" that reached number one in several countries.

"Do the Bartman", co-written by Michael Jackson, was released as the first single from The Simpsons Sing the Blues. It reached number one on the singles charts in Australia, Ireland, New Zealand, Norway, and the United Kingdom, eventually becoming certified gold in the latter country with 400,000 units sold. In Ireland, "Do the Bartman" spent nine weeks at number one on the Irish Singles Chart—only seven singles have managed a longer run. The single was accompanied by a popular music video that became the number one music video on rotation on the American MTV network in November 1990. "Deep, Deep Trouble", the second single from The Simpsons Sing the Blues, did not achieve as much popularity as "Do the Bartman" but managed to reach number one in Ireland and the top ten in New Zealand and the United Kingdom. A music video was produced for this single as well, premiering in March 1991. The third and final single, "God Bless the Child" (a cover of the Billie Holiday song with the same name), failed to chart.

In March 1997, a soundtrack album titled Songs in the Key of Springfield was released that included many of the musical numbers from the series' first years (1990–96). The album featured much of the work of The Simpsons composer Alf Clausen, who has co-written, arranged, produced, and conducted almost all music that is used on the show. This compilation of songs did not match the success of the previous Simpsons album, but peaked at number 103 in the United States and number 18 in the United Kingdom, where it was certified silver with more than 60,000 units sold. Following the popularity of The Simpsons Sing the Blues, The Simpsons executive producer James L. Brooks wanted to produce a follow-up album, also with original music not previously featured in the series. The cast members recorded this second studio album based on The Simpsons, named The Yellow Album and scheduled for release in 1993, but Groening was against it; as a result, it was not released until November 1998. It was poorly received by critics and did not chart.

A sequel to Songs in the Key of Springfield was released in October 1999, titled Go Simpsonic with The Simpsons. It contained songs that had appeared in the series since the previous soundtrack album was released, as well as some earlier ones that did not make the cut in Songs in the Key of Springfield. Most of the 53 tracks featured were composed by Clausen. The album peaked at number 197 on the Billboard 200. The Simpsons: Testify, the third and latest album (as of 2012) to feature music from The Simpsons, was released eight years later in September 2007. Like its predecessors, the majority of the tracks were composed by Clausen. The album, which did not chart, contains songs from the series' eleventh season (1999) to its eighteenth season (2007).

The Simpsons Movie, a feature-length film based on the television series, was released in theaters in July 2007. Brooks chose Hans Zimmer to compose the score of the film as they were good friends and regular collaborators. This score was released in July 2007 on a soundtrack album called The Simpsons Movie: The Music, which peaked at number 108 in the United States. While working on the score, Zimmer turned the "Spider Pig" song sung by Homer in The Simpsons Movie into a choral piece that he originally did not intend to put into the film. However, it ended up being used and was included in the soundtrack. Zimmer's "Spider Pig" was popular and appeared on the singles charts in several countries, reaching number three in Ireland, eight in New Zealand, 14 in Norway, 23 in the United Kingdom, and 53 in Sweden. In addition to appearing in The Simpsons Movie, the members of the punk rock band Green Day recorded their own version of the Simpsons theme for the film. It was released as a single in July 2007 and became a top-twenty hit in Ireland and the United Kingdom.

== Albums ==
=== Studio albums ===
List of studio albums, with selected chart positions and certifications
| Title | Album details | Peak chart positions | | | | | | | | Certifications |
| Title | Album details | US | AUS | CAN | NOR | NLD | NZ | SWE | UK | Certifications |
|---|---|---|---|---|---|---|---|---|---|---|
| The Simpsons Sing the Blues | Released: December 4, 1990 (US); Label: Geffen; Format: Cassette, CD, LP | 3 | 24 | 6 | 17 | 36 | 2 | 24 | 6 | RIAA: 3× Platinum; ARIA: Gold; BPI: Gold |
| The Yellow Album | Released: November 24, 1998 (US); Label: Geffen; Format: Cassette, CD | — | — | — | — | — | — | — | — | |
"—" denotes a recording that did not chart or was not released in that territory.

=== Soundtrack albums ===
List of soundtrack albums, with selected chart positions and certifications
| Title | Album details | Peak chart positions | | | | | Certifications |
| Title | Album details | US | AUS | BEL | CAN | UK | Certifications |
|---|---|---|---|---|---|---|---|
| Songs in the Key of Springfield | Released: March 18, 1997 (US); Label: Rhino Entertainment; Format: Cassette, CD | 103 | 26 | 19 | 54 | 18 | ARIA: Gold; BPI: Silver |
| Go Simpsonic with The Simpsons | Released: November 2, 1999 (US); Label: Rhino Entertainment; Format: Cassette, CD | 197 | 82 | — | — | — | |
| The Simpsons Movie: The Music | Released: July 24, 2007 (US); Label: Adrenaline Music Group; Format: CD, digital download | 108 | 81 | — | — | — | |
| The Simpsons: Testify | Released: September 18, 2007 (US); Label: Shout! Factory; Format: CD, digital download | — | — | — | — | — | |
"—" denotes a recording that did not chart or was not released in that territory.

=== Compilation albums ===
List of compilation albums, with relevant details
| Title | Album details |
|---|---|
| Go Simpsonic with The Simpsons and Songs in the Key of Springfield | Released: July 16, 2001 (US); Label: Rhino Entertainment; Formats: CD |

== Singles ==
List of singles, with selected chart positions, showing year released and album name
| Title | Year | Peak chart positions | | | | | | | | | | | Certifications | Album |
| Title | Year | US | AUS | AUT | CAN | IRL | NLD | NOR | NZ | SWI | SWE | UK | Certifications | Album |
|---|---|---|---|---|---|---|---|---|---|---|---|---|---|---|
| "Do the Bartman" | 1990 | — | 1 | 17 | 14 | 1 | 3 | 1 | 1 | 12 | 3 | 1 | ARIA: Gold; BPI: Gold | The Simpsons Sing the Blues |
| "Deep, Deep Trouble" | 1991 | 69 | 35 | — | — | 1 | 37 | — | 10 | — | 13 | 7 | | The Simpsons Sing the Blues |
| "God Bless the Child" | 1991 | — | — | — | — | — | — | — | — | — | — | — | | The Simpsons Sing the Blues |
| "The Streets of Springfield" | 1997 | — | — | — | — | — | — | — | — | — | — | — | | — |
| "Spider Pig" | 2007 | — | — | — | — | 3 | — | 14 | 8 | — | 53 | 23 | | The Simpsons Movie: The Music |
| "The Simpsons Theme" | 2007 | — | — | — | 61 | 15 | — | — | — | — | 34 | 19 | | — |
| "Everyone Is Horrid Except Me (and Possibly You)" (credited to Quilloughby feat. Lisa Simpson) | 2021 | — | — | — | — | — | — | — | — | — | — | — | | — |
"—" denotes a recording that did not chart or was not released in that territory.

== Music videos ==
List of music videos, showing year released and director
| Title | Year | Director |
|---|---|---|
| "Do the Bartman" | 1990 | Brad Bird |
| "Deep, Deep Trouble" | 1991 | Gregg Vanzo |
