= List of The Simpsons books =

This is a list of books relating to The Simpsons television series.

== Official books ==
Year	Title	Author	ISBN
1990	Greetings from The Simpsons	Matt Groening	0-06-096580-0 (original); 0-06-113830-4 (2006 edition)
1990	The Simpsons Xmas Book	Matt Groening and Mimi Pond	0-06-096581-9
1991	The Simpsons Rainy Day Fun Book	Matt Groening	0-06-096861-3
1991	The Simpsons Uncensored Family Album	Matt Groening	0-06-096582-7 (original); 0-06-113830-4 (2006 edition)
1991	Maggie Simpson's Book of Animals	Maggie Groening and Matt Groening	0-694-00321-2
1991	Maggie Simpson's Counting Book	Maggie Groening and Matt Groening	0-694-00319-0
1991	Maggie Simpson's Book of Colors and Shapes	Maggie Groening and Matt Groening	0-694-00320-4
1991	Maggie Simpson's Alphabet Book	Maggie Groening and Matt Groening	0-694-00318-2
1992	The Simpsons Fun in the Sun Book	Matt Groening	0-00-653101-6
1993	Bart Simpson's Guide to Life	Matt Groening	0-06-096975-X
1993	The Simpsons Ultra-Jumbo Rain or Shine Fun Book	Matt Groening	0-06-095006-4
1993	Matt Groening's Cartooning with The Simpsons	Matt Groening	0-06-096874-5
1998	The Simpsons Guide To Springfield: An 'Are We There Yet?' Book	Matt Groening	0-06-095282-2
1998	The Simpsons on Parade' Book	Matt Groening	978-1-85286-955-7
2002	The Simpsons Songbook	Matt Groening and Alf Clausen	1-4234-1229-X
2004	The Simpsons Jigsaw Book (Australia)		1-86503-857-1
2007	The Simpsons Masterpiece Gallery: A Big Book of Posters	Matt Groening	0-06-134103-7
2007	The Simpsons Handbook	Matt Groening and Bill Morrison	0-06-123129-0

=== The Simpsons Library of Wisdom ===
Year	Title	Author	ISBN
2004	The Bart Book	Bill Morrison and Matt Groening	0-06-073885-5
2004	The Homer Book	Bill Morrison and Matt Groening	0-06-073884-7
2005	Comic Book Guy's Book of Pop Culture	Evan Dorkin and Bill Morrison	0-06-074821-4
2005	The Ralph Wiggum Book	Bill Morrison and Matt Groening	0-06-074820-6
2006	The Krusty Book	Karen Bates and Jamie Angell	0-06-074822-2
2006	The Lisa Book	Bill Morrison and Matt Groening	0-06-074823-0
2008	Flanders' Book of Faith	Edwin Aguilar, Mary Trainor, et al.	0-06-133901-6
2008	The Book of Moe	Marcos Asprec, Terry Delegeane; et al.	0-06-128432-7
2009	The Marge Book	Bill Morrison and Matt Groening	0-06-169880-6
2010	Chief Wiggum's Book of Crime and Punishment	Matt Groening and Bill Morrison	0-06-178743-4

=== Episode guides ===
The Simpsons episode guides

Year	Title	Seasons	Edited by	ISBN
1997	The Simpsons: A Complete Guide to Our Favorite Family	Shorts, 1–8	Ray Richmond, Antonia Coffman	0-06-095252-0
1999	The Simpsons Forever!: A Complete Guide to Our Favorite Family ...Continued	9–10	Scott M. Gimple	0-06-098763-4
2002	The Simpsons Beyond Forever!: A Complete Guide to Our Favorite Family ...Still Continued	11–12	Jesse L. McCann	0-06-050592-3
2005	The Simpsons One Step Beyond Forever!: A Complete Guide to Our Favorite Family ...Continued Yet Again	13–14	Jesse L. McCann	0-06-081754-2
2010	Simpsons World: The Ultimate Episode Guide: Seasons 1–20	1–20	Richmond, Coffman, Gimple, McCann	0-06-171128-4

=== Vault of Simpsonology ===
Year	Title	ISBN
2013	Homer Simpson's Little Book of Laziness	978-1-60887-226-8
2014	Bart Simpson's Manual of Mischief	978-1-60887-310-4
2014	C. Montgomery Burns' Handbook of World Domination	978-1-60887-320-3
2015	Lisa Simpson's Guide to Geek Chic	978-1-60887-321-0
2015	Grampa Simpson's Guide to Aging	978-1-60887-452-1
2016	Bartman: The Superhero's Handbook	978-1-60887-453-8

== Annuals ==
- The Simpsons Annual 1992 in Mind-Bending, Knee-Slapping, Eye-Popping 3D
- The Simpsons Annual 2010
- The Simpsons Annual 2011
- The Simpsons Annual 2012
- The Simpsons Annual 2013
- The Simpsons Annual 2014
- Bart Simpson Annual 2011
- Bart Simpson Annual 2012
- Bart Simpson Annual 2013
- Bart Simpson Annual 2014

== See also ==
- List of The Simpsons comics
- Bibliography of works on The Simpsons
- Simpsons Illustrated magazine

== Sources ==
- "THE SIMPSONS — Season 19 (2007-2008) - Book list". FoxFlash. Archived from the original on 2008-08-31.
