= The Simpsons Movie: The Music =

Film score / Soundtrack album by Hans Zimmer
- Released: July 24, 2007
- Recorded: July 2006 – May 2007
- Genres: Score, soundtrack
- Length: 40:45
- Labels: Adrenaline Music Group; Gracie Films; 20th Century Fox; Fox Music; Alternative Distribution Alliance; Extreme Music
- Producer: Hans Zimmer

The Simpsons soundtrack albums chronology
Go Simpsonic with The Simpsons (1999)	The Simpsons Movie: The Music (2007)	The Simpsons: Testify (2007)

Hans Zimmer chronology
Pirates of the Caribbean: At World's End (2007)	The Simpsons Movie (2007)	Casi Divas (2008)

The Simpsons Movie: The Music is a soundtrack album for the 2007 film The Simpsons Movie, composed and arranged by Hans Zimmer. The soundtrack was released on July 24, 2007, by Adrenaline Music Group and peaked at number 108 on the Billboard 200 chart. A limited-edition version (with a donut-shaped packaging) was released on July 31, 2007. Critics have given the album generally positive reviews.

== Background ==
Producer James L. Brooks chose Zimmer to compose the film's score, as they were good friends and regular collaborators. Regular Simpsons composer Alf Clausen was not asked to score the film. Zimmer was composing for Pirates of the Caribbean: At World's End at the same time as he did The Simpsons Movie. He told The Hollywood Reporter that he liked "using all his creative juices at once." Zimmer felt that the score was a "unique challenge", and he had to "try and express the style of The Simpsons without wearing the audience out". He used Danny Elfman's original opening theme from the series, but did not wish to overuse it.

For the soundtrack, Zimmer created themes for each member of the family. Homer's leitmotif was a major focus, and he also composed smaller themes for Bart and Marge. Zimmer asked arranger Michael A. Levine to turn the Spider-Pig song into a choral piece, which, at the time, had no place in the film. Later, Brooks decided to use it for the scene in which Homer has a psychedelic epiphany and then, again, as the first number in the closing credits. The lyrics of the piece were translated for the 32 dubbed versions of the song when the film was released internationally. The same choir learned to sing the piece for each of the foreign-language dubs. Levine also composed and arranged the music for when Homer and Marge make love with the help of Alaskan wildlife. The piece features soprano Elin Carlson singing all three parts of a vocal trio.

== Reception ==
Professional ratings
Review scores
Source	Rating
AllMusic	3/5 stars
Pitchfork	3.3/10

The soundtrack was released on July 24, 2007. It debuted and peaked at number 108 on the Billboard 200, and stayed on the chart for three weeks. It also reached number ten on Billboard's Independent Albums chart and number eight on the Top Soundtracks chart. The "Spider Pig" song from the album charted in several countries, reaching number eight on New Zealand's Top 40 Singles Chart, fourteen on Norway's VG-lista, twenty-three on the UK Singles Chart, and fifty-three on the Swedish Singles Chart.

The soundtrack has received generally favorable reviews from critics. Stephen Thomas Erlewine of Allmusic wrote that "the zany, zesty work of Alf Clausen has been traded in for the lush, symphonic touch of Hans Zimmer, who manages to retain enough of the spirit of the show but gives it a full-fledged widescreen makeover. In other words, this soundtrack is a traditional score [...] and even with titles as wacky as 'Doomsday Is Family Time,' 'Thank You Boob Lady,' and 'Why Does Everything I Whip Leave Me?,' the soundtrack doesn't sound all that humorous. It merely sounds like the sweeping yet sensitive mood music to a movie. And on those terms, The Simpsons Movie is a very good soundtrack — perhaps not as clever as Clausen, but it's still light on its feet while having enough pomp and circumstance to justify being shown on such a larger screen."

== Track listing ==
No.	Title	Length
1.	"The Simpsons Theme (Orchestral Version)"	1:27
2.	"Trapped Like Carrots"	2:15
3.	"Doomsday is Family Time"	2:27
4.	"Release the Hounds"	2:19
5.	"Clap for Alaska"	1:55
6.	"What's an Epiphany?"	2:07
7.	"Thank You Boob Lady"	2:45
8.	"You Doomed Us All... Again"	5:52
9.	"...Lead, Not to Read"	2:05
10.	"Why Does Everything I Whip Leave Me?"	3:05
11.	"Bart's Doodle"	1:01
12.	"World's Fattest Fertilizer Salesman"	5:05
13.	"His Big Fat Butt Could Shield Us All"	1:46
14.	"Spider Pig"	1:04
15.	"Recklessly Impulsive"	5:27
16.	"Homer, Bart, and a Bike" (iTunes bonus track in US/Canada)	2:24
Total length:		40:45

Additional music by Ryeland Allison, Lorne Balfe, Jim Dooley, Henry Jackman, Michael A. Levine, Atli Örvarsson, and Heitor Pereira.

Tracks 1, 6, 7, 9, 13 includes "The Simpsons Theme" by Danny Elfman

Track 14 based on "Spider-Man" theme by Bob Harris and Paul Francis Webster; parody lyrics by James L. Brooks, Matt Groening, Al Jean, Ian Maxtone-Graham, George Meyer, David Mirkin, Mike Reiss, Mike Scully, Matt Selman, John Swartzwelder and Jon Vitti

Orchestra conducted by Nick Glennie-Smith and Blake Neely.

== Charts ==
Chart performance for The Simpsons Movie: The Music
Chart (2007)	Peak position
Australian Albums (ARIA)	81
US Billboard 200	108
