= Go Simpsonic with The Simpsons =

1999 soundtrack album from The Simpsons

Soundtrack album by The Simpsons
- Released: November 2, 1999
- Genre: Soundtrack
- Length: 61:12
- Label: Rhino

The Simpsons chronology
The Yellow Album (1998)	Go Simpsonic with The Simpsons (1999)	The Simpsons Movie: The Music (2007)

Go Simpsonic with The Simpsons is the 1999 soundtrack album from The Simpsons. It takes many of the musical numbers from the series which were either not included in the previous album, Songs in the Key of Springfield, or were created since the previous album's release. The album has 53 tracks, most of which were written by Alf Clausen. It was well received by critics, being named the Best Compilation Album of 1999 by Soundtrack.net, and charted at number 197 on the Billboard 200. Hollywood Records released the album on digital and streaming platforms on December 9, 2021.

== Background and release ==
Go Simpsonic with The Simpsons is a soundtrack album that features songs that have appeared on the American animated television series The Simpsons, as well as some songs that never made the final cut. It is a sequel to the album Songs in the Key of Springfield, and the second album to feature songs from the show. The third and latest soundtrack album, The Simpsons: Testify, was released eight years after Go Simpsonic in 2007.

Most songs on the album were written by Alf Clausen, who is the composer on The Simpsons and co-writes, arranges, produces, and conducts almost all music that is featured in the show. Although the album also features covers of songs written by others. For example, a cover of "The Star-Spangled Banner" sung by the character Bleeding Gums Murphy, and a cover of Terry Cashman's "Talkin' Baseball" called "Talkin' Softball", that Cashman himself sung on the show, are included. The main theme song of The Simpsons, written by Danny Elfman, is also featured.

The album was released on the Rhino Records label on November 2, 1999, during the eleventh season of the show. It peaked at number 197 on the Billboard 200, number two on Top Kid Audio and number 14 on Top Internet Albums. The album remained on the Top Kid Audio chart for 17 weeks.

== Critical reception ==
Professional ratings
Review scores
Source	Rating
AllMusic	5/5 stars
Q	3/5 stars
Soundtrack.Net	5/5 stars

Go Simpsonic with The Simpsons received positive reviews from most music critics upon its release. AllMusic's Stephen Thomas Erlewine gave the album a five out of five rating, writing that "it serves as a reminder of the sheer brilliance of the music within this peerless show. Much of that musical brilliance is due to Alf Clausen [...] Hearing all of this music, ranging from the first to the ninth season, in one place confirms how Clausen and his collaborators can master everything from show tunes to commercial jingles. What's really impressive is that the music is every bit as funny, sometimes more so, than the lyrics — and that's no easy trick to pull off."

Soundtrack.net named Go Simpsonic the Best Compilation Album of 1999. The creator of that website, David A. Koran, said the album features some of his all-time favorites from the show, including the song "Canyonero". He also wrote that "one of Alf Clausen's other great talents besides working well along great lyricists is his ability to parody without sounding like an exact knock-off. In 'The Simpsons Spin-Off Showcase' medley, the 'Chief Wiggum, P.I' cue was great invention in the style of Jan Hammer's original orchestrations for Miami Vice." Koran also praised the "Scorpio" and "McBain" songs for their similarities with John Barry's James Bond tunes. Similarly, Elysa Gardner of Los Angeles Times commended the parodic nature of many songs on the album. She wrote that "this showcases the brilliant work of series composer Alf Clausen and his delightful knack of spoofing various musical forms. Included are sendups of musicals, movies (Mary Poppins and Bond themes) and commercials, each lovingly and lethally delivered. There are 53 cuts in all, and most of them, like the show itself, stand up to repeated listenings. A treasure."

Alan Sepinwall of The Star-Ledger was more critical, writing that "Unfortunately, Songs in the Key [...] used up most of the show's best musical inventory, leaving only assorted scraps for Go Simpsonic. There are some wonderful tunes, including the 'Mary Poppins'-ish 'Cut Every Corner,' Bart and Sideshow Bob performing the score to 'HMS Pinafore,' the SUV parody commercial 'Canyonero,' and Homer and Marge's take on the All in the Family theme [...], but too much of it is filler."

== Track listing ==
Track – Artist(s)
1. "The Simpsons Main Title" - The Alf Clausen Orchestra
2. "Lisa's Sax": "Those Were The Days/'WB's Proud To Present' Theme" - Dan Castellaneta/Julie Kavner/Nancy Cartwright
3. "All Singing, All Dancing": "'Gonna Paint Our Wagon' Theme & Reprise/A Singing, Dancing,..." - Dan Castellaneta/Julie Kavner/Nancy Cartwright/Hank Azaria/Yeardley Smith
4. We Put the Spring in Springfield - Dan Castellaneta/Harry Shearer/Tress MacNeille
5. "Simpsoncalifragilisticexpiala(Annoyed Grunt)cious": "Turkey In The Straw/Minimum Wage Nanny" - Dan Castellaneta/Julie Kavner/Nancy Cartwright/Yeardley Smith
6. "Cut Every Corner" - Dan Castellaneta/Nancy Cartwright/Hank Azaria/Yeardley Smith/Maggie Roswell
7. "A Boozehound Named Barney" - Dan Castellaneta/Nancy Cartwright/Hank Azaria/Yeardley Smith
8. "Happy Just the Way We Are" - Dan Castellaneta/Julie Kavner/Nancy Cartwright/Yeardley Smith/Harry Shearer
9. "Simpsoncalifragilisticexpiala(D'oh)cious End Credits Suite" - The Alf Clausen Orchestra
10. "Cash and Cary" - Dan Castellaneta/Nancy Cartwright/Yeardley Smith/Harry Shearer
11. "Meet The Flintstones" - Dan Castellaneta
12. "Underwater Wonderland" - Dan Castellaneta/Julie Kavner
13. "Happy Birthday, Mr. Burns" - The Ramones/Harry Shearer
14. "The Field of Excellence" - Nancy Cartwright/Yeardley Smith/Harry Shearer/Awards Show Singers
15. "The Itchy & Scratchy & Poochie Show Theme" - Studio Singers
16. "Poochie Rap Song" - Dan Castellaneta/Harry Shearer
17. "The City of New York vs. Homer Simpson": "No Regards/You're Checkin' In" - The Alf Clausen Orchestra/Julie Kavner/Nancy Cartwright/Yeardley Smith
18. "'Quimby' Campaign Commercial" - Hank Azaria/Harry Shearer
19. "The Simpsons End Credits Theme" - Sonic Youth
20. "Trash of the Titans": "Before The Garbage, Man!/The Garbageman" - Dan Castellaneta/Julie Kavner/Nancy Cartwright/Yeardley Smith
21. "Canyonero" - Hank Williams, Jr./Studio Singers
22. "Everyone Loves Ned Flanders (The Adventures Of Ned Flanders Theme)" - Dan Castellaneta/Nancy Cartwright/Harry Shearer
23. "Scorpio End Credits" - Sally Stevens
24. "Chief Wiggum, P.I. Main Title" - The Alf Clausen Orchestra/Phil Hartman
25. "The Love-Matic Grampa Main Title" - Phil Hartman/Studio Singers
26. "The Simpsons Spin-Off Showcase": "The Simpsons Family Smile-Time Variety Hour Opening Theme..." - Dan Castellaneta/Julie Kavner/Nancy Cartwright/Harry Shearer/Pamela Hayden/Tim Conway
27. "The Ballad of Jebediah Springfield" - Rick Logan/Dick Wells/Tommy Morgan
28. "In Marge We Trust": "Klang And Koto/'Mr. Sparkle' Theme & Logo" - Dan Castellaneta/Nancy Cartwright/Yeardley Smith/Sab Shimono
29. "Krusty the Clown Main Title" - The Alf Clausen Orchestra
30. "Cape Feare": "Any Last Requests?/H.M.S. Pinafore/Bart's Holding The Buttercup Bart And Bop Bop And..." - Nancy Cartwright/Kelsey Grammer
31. "Mr. Plow" - Dan Castellaneta/Nancy Cartwright/Yeardley Smith
32. "Plow King" - Dan Castellaneta/Hank Azaria/Linda Ronstadt
33. "'Kamp Krusty' Theme Song" - Hank Azaria
34. "The Simpsons End Credits Theme" - Dan Castellaneta/Terry Harrington
35. "Union Strike Folk Song (Parts 1 & 2)" - Yeardley Smith/Harry Shearer
36. "Rappin' Ronnie Reagan" - Dan Castellaneta/Harry Shearer
37. "Cletus the Slack-Jawed Yokel!" - Hank Azaria/Rick Logan/Dick Wells/Tress MacNeille
38. "Ya-Hoo Main Title" - The Alf Clausen Orchestra/Hank Azaria
39. "The Land of Chocolate" - Dan Castellaneta/Hank Azaria/Phil Hartman
40. "'Skinner & the Superintendent' Theme" - Hank Azaria/Studio Singers
41. "Presidents' Song" - Harry Shearer
42. "The Star-Spangled Banner" - Harry Shearer/Daryl L. Coley
43. "Talkin' Softball" - Terry Cashman
44. "Like Father, Like Clown": "A Warm Round/Oh, My Papa/A Love Thing" - Dan Castellaneta/Hank Azaria/Jackie Mason
45. "Blessed Be the Guy That Bonds (McBain End Credits)" - Sally Stevens
46. "You're Gonna Like Me (The Gabbo Song)" - Lil' Weenis/Harry Shearer/Pamela Hayden
47. "Can I Borrow a Feeling?" - Hank Azaria/Maggie Roswell
48. "The Simpsons End Credits Theme" - The Alf Clausen Orchestra
49. "We Love to Smoke - Julie Kavner
50. "Apu in 'The Jolly Bengali' Theme" - Studio Singers
51. "The Garbageman Can (Long Demo Version)" - Studio Singers (While U2's voices were heard on the program, they are replaced on this album by noticeably different voices.)
52. "Señor Burns (Long Version)" - Tito Puente & His Latin Jazz Ensemble
53. "Happy Birthday, Mr. Smithers" - Harry Shearer

== Charts ==
Chart performance for Go Simpsonic with The Simpsons
Chart (2000)	Peak position
Australian Albums (ARIA)	82
US Billboard 200	197
US Top Kid Albums (Billboard)	2
