= Bibliography of works on The Simpsons =

Bibliography of works on The Simpsons is a list of works about the American multimedia franchise The Simpsons, its themes, and its cultural influence.

== Chronological list ==
- Roberts, Gareth; Russell, Gary (1997). I Can't Believe It's an Unofficial Simpsons Guide. Virgin Publishing. ISBN 9780753501665.
- LaRue, William D. (1999). Collecting Simpsons!: An Unofficial Guide to Merchandise from 'The Simpsons'. KML Enterprises. ISBN 9780967542102.
- Cartwright, Nancy (2000). My Life as a 10-Year-Old Boy. Hyperion. ISBN 0786886005.
- Getz, Robert W. (2001). Further Adventures in the Simpsons Collectibles: An Unauthorized Guide. Schiffer Publishing. ISBN 9780764312311.
- Irwin, William; Conrad, Mark T.; Skoble, Aeon J., eds. (2001). The Simpsons and Philosophy: The D'oh! of Homer. Open Court Publishing Company. ISBN 0812694333.
- Pinksy, Mark I.; Campolo, Tony (2001). The Gospel According to the Simpsons. Westminster John Knox Press. ISBN 9780664224196.
- Alberti, John, ed. (2004). Leaving Springfield: The Simpsons and the Possibility of Oppositional Culture. Wayne State University Press. ISBN 0814328490.
- Turner, Chris (2004). Planet Simpson: How a Cartoon Masterpiece Documented an Era and Defined a Generation. Random House. ISBN 0679313184.
- Gray, Jonathan (2005). Watching with The Simpsons: Television, Parody, and Intertextuality. Routledge. ISBN 9780415362023.
- Brown, Alan S.; Logan, Chris, eds. (2006). The Psychology of The Simpsons: D'oh!. BenBella Books. ISBN 1932100709.
- Couch, Paul (2007). The Bluffer's Guide to The Simpsons. Bluffer's Guides. Oval Books. ISBN 9781906042066.
- Halpern, Paul (2007). What's Science Ever Done For Us: What the Simpsons Can Teach Us About Physics, Robots, Life, and the Universe. Wiley. ISBN 9780470114605.
- Delaney, Tim (2008). Simpsonology: There's a Little Bit of Springfield in All of Us. Prometheus Books. ISBN 9781591025597.
- Foy, Joseph J., ed. (2008). Homer Simpson Goes to Washington: American Politics through Popular Culture. University Press of Kentucky. ISBN 9780813125121.
- Heit, Jamey (2008). The Springfield Reformation: The Simpsons, Christianity, and American Culture. Bloomsbury Academic. ISBN 9780826428967.
- Ortved, John (2009). The Simpsons: An Uncensored, Unauthorized History. Faber and Faber. ISBN 978-0865479883.
- Waltonen, Karma; Du Vernay, Denise (2010). The Simpsons in the Classroom: Embiggening the Learning Experience with the Wisdom of Springfield. McFarland & Company. ISBN 9780786444908.
- Singh, Simon (2013). The Simpsons and Their Mathematical Secrets. Bloomsbury. ISBN 9781620402771.
- Reiss, Mike (2018). Springfield Confidential: Jokes, Secrets, and Outright Lies from a Lifetime Writing for The Simpsons. Dey Street. ISBN 9780062748034.
- Waltonen, Karma, ed. (2019). The Simpsons' Beloved Springfield: Essays on the TV Series and Town That Are Part of Us All. McFarland & Company. ISBN 9781476674551.

== See also ==
- List of The Simpsons books
