= Simpsons Illustrated =

Magazine about The Simpsons

- Cover of the first Simpsons Illustrated magazine
- Magazine editor: Ted Brock
- Frequency: Quarterly
- Circulation: 1 million
- Publisher: Welsh Publishing Company
- First issue: April 4, 1991
- Final issue Number: 1993; 10
- Language: English

Simpsons Illustrated was a companion magazine to the American animated television show The Simpsons. It featured, among many other things, articles and interviews about the show, and comics based on the Simpsons universe. Simpsons Illustrated was published between 1991 and 1993 and led to the establishment of the Bongo Comics Group.

== History ==
Simpsons Illustrated was produced by Matt Groening, Bill Morrison, Cindy and Steve Vance, and Katy Dobbs was the editorial director. It ran for ten issues from 1991 to 1993. Welsh Publishing Company issued it four times a year. The magazine had a circulation of one million.

Bill Morrison drew and wrote all the Simpsons comics for Simpsons Illustrated, while the Arnold strip was drawn by Simpsons creator Matt Groening's brother-in-law, Craig Bartlett. This strip was later adapted for the animated series Hey Arnold!.

The first issue was released on April 4, 1991. It included a copy of the Springfield Shopper, a fictional newspaper from the show, and a fold-out poster describing every character from the show and their relationship to each other. An original bedtime story told by Bart was included, along with an Official Simpsons Illustrated School Survival Handbook, which shared Bart's classroom tactical tips, guerrilla strategies and a diagram displaying the best seat in class.

The final issue of Simpsons Illustrated was a one-shot comic edition titled Simpsons Comics and Stories. The overwhelming success of this seemingly one-shot book was the reason that Bongo Comics Group was created.

== Content ==
Features in the magazine included in-depth articles and interviews with the cast and crew, diagrams of major characters' dream houses, comics, and fanart (which was highly encouraged). Another recurring feature in the magazine was a comic strip called Arnold, which featured the protagonist of what would later become the cartoon Hey Arnold! on the American television network Nickelodeon. One issue was in 3-D and included glasses.

The magazine also reported on real news related to the show. One story was about a protest held on February 13, 1991. A local citizens' group fought the state's plan to create a nuclear waste dump in their neighborhood. It organized Citizens Against Radioactive Dumping (CARD) and demonstrated at the monthly meeting of the Low-Level Radioactive Waste Siting Commission in Albany, New York. Four kids dressed up as Homer Simpson, Marge Simpson, Bart Simpson and Lisa Simpson, and presented a three-eyed fabric fish, which looked like Blinky from the second season episode "Two Cars in Every Garage and Three Eyes on Every Fish", to the commission. They also performed a rap song, which explained the plot of the episode.

== See also ==
- List of The Simpsons comics
- List of The Simpsons books
