= The Simpsons Uncensored Family Album =

1991 book by Matt Groening

- Cover art, referencing a 1972 Cosmopolitan centerfold with Burt Reynolds
- Author: Matt Groening
- Language: English
- Genre: Fiction, memoir
- Publisher: Harper Paperbacks
- Publication date: November 20, 1991
- Publication place: United States
- Media type: Paperback
- Pages: 64
- ISBN: 978-0-06-096582-2

The Simpsons Uncensored Family Album is a 1991 book, by Matt Groening, that mimics a family album that the Simpsons television family would have. It includes family trees of the Bouvier (Marge Simpson's ancestors) and Simpson families. The Simpsons Uncensored Family Album was published by Harper Paperbacks. Reviews of the book from critics have noted that fans of The Simpsons should enjoy it.

== Background ==
The author of The Simpsons Uncensored Family Album is Matt Groening, the creator of the animated series The Simpsons on which the book is based. It was released by Harper Paperbacks on November 20, 1991. The book's cover, which features the character Bart Simpson lying naked on his stomach on a bearskin rug, is a reference to a 1972 centerfold of Cosmopolitan in which American actor Burt Reynolds posed naked in a similar way. Newer printings feature Homer naked on the rug.

== Contents ==
The album begins with photographs and memorabilia from the ancestors of the two families, and then progresses with baby photos of Homer and Marge, and then profiles them as they grow up and fall in love. Finally it shows photographs and memorabilia from Bart's, Lisa's and Maggie's childhoods. The Simpson tree can be found on the inside of the front cover, while the Bouvier family appears on the inside of the back cover. It is revealed by the family trees, for example, that Homer is descended from Scandinavians and American Indians, and Marge is descended from the French. Through a series of marriages, one can see that the Simpsons are distantly related to Mr. Burns. The information in the book has been contradicted several times on The Simpsons and its canonicity is unknown.

== Reception ==
Ann Burt Meyer of The Capital Times noted that "children will clamor for this full-color cartoon book if they're fans of the show. Adult buyers may want to check it out first — because the book, like the TV show, has innuendoes for adults only." Charles Solomon of the Los Angeles Times wrote that "fans of television's most popular underachievers will enjoy Groening's The Simpsons Uncensored Family Album a collection of bizarre memorabilia that traces the clan back to their bug-eyed ancestors Sven Simpson, Claretta Ethridge, Mary Frowning Cloud, and Joe Puffing Goat."
