= The Simpsons: Testify =

2007 soundtrack album

Soundtrack album by Various
- Released: September 18, 2007
- Recorded: 1999–2006
- Labels: Shout! Factory; Sony BMG (US) EMI (UK)

The Simpsons chronology
| The Simpsons Movie: The Music (2007) | The Simpsons: Testify (2007) |

The Simpsons: Testify is an album that features songs from the animated television series The Simpsons. It was released on September 18, 2007. It includes appearances by artists such as Jackson Browne, Shawn Colvin, David Byrne, the B-52's, Baha Men, NRBQ and "Weird Al" Yankovic, and an alternate version of the end credits performed by Los Lobos. Ricky Gervais, Steve Buscemi and Kelsey Grammer are also featured in various songs.

It includes four previously unaired bonus tracks: "Hullaba Lula" (featuring Kelsey Grammer as Sideshow Bob), "Song of the Wild Beasts", "Dancing Workers' Song" and "Oldies and Nudies".

== Track listing ==
The album features the following tracks:

| No. | Title | Episode | Character(s) |
|---|---|---|---|
| 1. | "The Simpsons" Main Title Theme | Every Episode | Danny Elfman |
| 2. | "Testify" | "Faith Off" | Bart Simpson, Sherri and Terri, Abe Simpson, Patty, Professor Frink |
| 3. | "The Very Reason That I Live" | "The Great Louse Detective" | Sideshow Bob, Bart Simpson |
| 4. | "He's the Man" (featuring Shawn Colvin) | "Alone Again, Natura-Diddily" | Carl, Lenny, Lisa Simpson, Marge Simpson, Ned Flanders, Rachel Jordan & Reverend Lovejoy, Bart Simpson |
| 5. | "Stretch Dude and Clobber Girl" | "Treehouse of Horror X" | Announcer, Chief Wiggum & Lisa Simpson |
| 6. | "The Simpsons End Credits Theme" | "Thank God, It's Doomsday" | Danny Elfman, Fred Wardenberg, Stephen Lawrence, Bruce Broughton, Carl Johnson, Cathi Rosenberg-Turow, and Tony Geiss |
| 7. | "Ode to Branson" | "The Old Man and the Key" | Charlie Callas, Charo, Mr. T, Ray Jay Johnson & Yakov Smirnoff |
| 8. | "Sold Separately" | "Homer vs. Dignity" | Waylon Smithers, Malibu Stacy & Mr. Burns |
| 9. | "Island of Sirens" | "Tales from the Public Domain" | Apu, Carl, Lenny & Professor Frink, Bart Simpson |
| 10. | "They'll Never Stop the Simpsons" | "Gump Roast" | Kang, Kodos & Singer |
| 11. | "You're a Bunch of Stuff" | "Large Marge" | Comic Book Guy, Dr. Hibbert, Lisa Simpson, Luigi, Marge Simpson, Moe, Mr. Burns, The Sea Captain & Snake |
| 12. | "What Do I Think of the Pie?" | "Special Edna" | Edna Krabappel, Lisa Simpson, Marge Simpson & Waitress |
| 13. | "Baby Stink Breath" | "Barting Over" | Misc. singers, Bart Simpson, Lisa Simpson, announcer |
| 14. | "Tastes Like Liberty" | "I'm Spelling as Fast as I Can" | Edna Krabappel, Bart Simpson, and Lisa Simpson |
| 15. | "Jellyfish" | "A Star Is Born Again" | Townspeople |
| 16. | "Homer & Marge (Love Goes On)" (featuring "Weird Al" Yankovic) | "Three Gays of the Condo" | "Weird Al" Yankovic |
| 17. | "Everybody Hates Ned Flanders" medley (featuring David Byrne) | "Dude, Where's My Ranch?" | Homer Simpson, Lenny Leonard, Carl Carlson, Moe Szyslak, Apu Nahasapeemapetilon, Reverend Lovejoy, Ned Flanders, and Rod and Todd Flanders |
| 18. | "I Love To Walk" (featuring Steve Buscemi) | "Brake My Wife, Please" | Homer Simpson, Disco Stu, Lenny Leonard, and Carl Carlson |
| 19. | "Marjorie" (featuring Jackson Browne) | "Brake My Wife, Please" | Jackson Browne |
| 20. | "The President Wore Pearls" medley | "The President Wore Pearls" | Lisa Simpson, Nelson Muntz, Principal Seymour Skinner, Groundskeeper Willie, and Bart Simpson |
| 21. | "Glove Slap" (featuring The B-52's) | "E-I-E-I-(Annoyed Grunt)" | The B-52's |
| 22. | "O Pruny Night" | "'Tis the Fifteenth Season" | California Prunes |
| 23. | "America (I Love This Country)" | "Simple Simpson" | |
| 24. | "America Rules" | "Bart-Mangled Banner" | Bart Simpson, Homer Simpson, Lisa Simpson, Marge Simpson |
| 25. | "Welcome to Moe's" | "Mommie Beerest" | Moe Szyslak, Marge Simpson, Bart Simpson, and Lisa Simpson, Lenny and Carl |
| 26. | "We Are the Jockeys" | "Saddlesore Galactica" | Homer Simpson, The Jockeys |
| 27. | "Song of Shelbyville" | "The Seven-Beer Snitch" | Shelbyville People |
| 28. | "A Star Is Torn" medley | "A Star Is Torn" | Lisa Simpson, Lenny Leonard, Lisa's rival, Ralph Wiggum |
| 29. | "Who Wants A Haircut?" (featuring Baha Men) | "Thank God, It's Doomsday" | Bart Simpson, Lisa Simpson, Marge Simpson, and Baha Men |
| 30. | "My Fair Laddy" medley | "My Fair Laddy" | Bart Simpson |
| 31. | "Springfield Blows" | "Million Dollar Abie" | Bart Simpson |
| 32. | "King of Cats" Itchy & Scratchy medley | "Girls Just Want to Have Sums" | The cast |
| 33. | "Lady" (featuring Ricky Gervais) | "Homer Simpson, This Is Your Wife" | Marge Simpson |
| 34. | "You Make Me Laugh" | "Homer Simpson, This Is Your Wife" | Marge Simpson |
| 35. | "Lady Riff" | "Homer Simpson, This Is Your Wife" | |
| 36. | "Poppa, Can You Hear Me?" | "Sleeping with the Enemy" | Nelson Muntz, Bart Simpson |
| 37. | "Yokel Chords" medley | "Yokel Chords" | Lisa Simpson, Principal Seymour Skinner, Cletus's kids, and Superintendent Chalmers |
| 38. | "Hullaba Lula" | unaired; "Day of the Jackanapes" | |
| 39. | "Song of the Wild Beasts" | unaired; "The Girl Who Slept Too Little" | |
| 40. | "Dancing Workers' Song" | unaired; "Kiss Kiss, Bang Bangalore" | |
| 41. | "Oldies and Nudies" | unaired; "Homerpalooza" | |

== Reception ==
Professional ratings
Review scores
| Source | Rating |
|---|---|
| AllMusic | 3.5/5 stars |
| Pitchfork | 5.3/10 |

Dalton Ross of Entertainment Weekly praised the CD, calling it his obsession of the week and saying "The Simpsons ... is still capable of short bursts of genius. And many of them are collected on the show's latest musical collection, The Simpsons Testify. Listening to the CD reminds you what made you fall in love with the show in the first place: the random cameos (David Byrne to Weird Al Yankovic), pop-culture parodies (Stretch Dude and Clobber Girl), and knowing, self-deprecating humor (They'll Never Stop the Simpsons). My personal favorite is Ode to Branson, which pays tribute to all the washed-up celebrities of yesteryear. ... So even if the show is no longer appointment viewing in your house, this CD definitely warrants another trip to Springfield."
