= The Simpsons episode guides =

List of books

Cover of the first episode guide, The Simpsons: A Complete Guide to Our Favorite Family (1997)

Five official episode guides for the American animated sitcom The Simpsons have been published by HarperCollins since 1997. The first guide covers seasons 1 to 8, while the following three cover seasons 9 to 14 (two seasons each). The fifth was released in 2010 and covers seasons 1 to 20.

== The Simpsons: A Complete Guide to Our Favorite Family ==
The first guide, The Simpsons: A Complete Guide to Our Favorite Family, was released in the fall of 1997. The book's publisher, HarperCollins, was owned by News Corporation, which also owned the show's producer 20th Century Fox Television. It was edited by Ray Richmond and Antonia Coffman, and includes a foreword by series creator Matt Groening. As an in-joke, the guide made an actual appearance in the 2003 episode "Today I Am a Clown", where Lisa uses it to remind Homer that Santa's Little Helper was supposedly neutered in a previous episode (specifically, "Two Dozen and One Greyhounds").

The guide provides an episode-by-episode history of the first eight seasons of The Simpsons. Each episode is covered in either one or two pages, featuring a synopsis, credits, pictures, and memorable quotes, as well as the episode's chalkboard gag. Obscure or hidden jokes are also brought to attention. The episodes are arranged in chronological order, and at the beginning of each season are two-page special features, such as a list and brief description of The Simpsons shorts from The Tracey Ullman Show, a list of times Homer has said "D'oh!", and a list of Itchy & Scratchy cartoons. On two pages there are short biographies of each of the five immediate members of the Simpson family, namely Homer, Marge, Bart, Lisa and Maggie. Short biographies of other Simpsons characters appear in sidebars to each episode's page, starting with Santa's Little Helper for "Simpsons Roasting on an Open Fire" and ending with Willem Dafoe's Commandant from "The Secret War of Lisa Simpson".

== The Simpsons Forever!: A Complete Guide to Our Favorite Family …Continued ==
The Simpsons Forever!: A Complete Guide to Our Favorite Family ...Continued is an episode guide for the ninth and tenth seasons of The Simpsons, starting with "The City of New York vs. Homer Simpson" and ending with "Thirty Minutes Over Tokyo". The book is the first companion to the original The Simpsons: A Complete Guide to Our Favorite Family, and was also published by HarperCollins. The Simpsons Forever! was edited by Scott M. Gimple and released in 1999.

Groening wrote an introduction to The Simpsons Forever!, just as he did with the original book. In his introduction, he claims that the choice was made to publish a second book as opposed to revising and republishing the last edition, to spare consumers from purchasing material they already owned. Groening goes on to describe the format of the book, which, like the last, includes synopses and quotes. The book continues the work of the last edition by listing the times Homer cries "D'oh!" or says "Mmm...", as well as new couch gags, but it includes unique features as well, including a tribute to Troy McClure, whose character was retired after his voice actor, Phil Hartman, was murdered. The guide also includes the lyrics to the Simpsons-related songs, "Do the Bartman" and "Deep, Deep Trouble".

== The Simpsons Beyond Forever!: A Complete Guide to Our Favorite Family …Still Continued ==
The Simpsons Beyond Forever!: A Complete Guide to Our Favorite Family ...Still Continued is an episode guide for the eleventh and twelfth seasons of The Simpsons. It was edited by Jesse L. McCann and published in 2002 by HarperCollins. The book is a companion to the prior Simpsons episode guides. The book consists of synopses and quotes for each episode, beginning with "Beyond Blunderdome" and ending with "Simpsons Tall Tales". In this way it follows the last two books. However, this edition dedicates two pages of coverage to every episode, and four pages of coverage for each Halloween special. It thus outdoes the prior editions, which had one-to-two page coverage for each episode. The book also continues the work of the last two editions by listing the times Homer cries "D'oh!" or says "Mmm...", as well as new couch gags, but it includes unique features as well, like Church marquees. Sketches from the early production are included.

Groening wrote an introduction to the book, as he had for the previous editions. In it, he refers to the eleventh and twelfth seasons as the "Wackier-Than-Ever Years", and explains that it had been the objective to take the series in unexpected directions. To this end, the character Apu became the father of octuplets ("Eight Misbehavin'") and Homer lost a thumb ("Trilogy of Error"). Groening also acknowledges the death of the character Maude Flanders during this timeframe ("Alone Again, Natura-Diddily"), saying that it was "funny, funny stuff — well, weird, anyway." Groening goes on to claim that these two seasons contained some of his personal favorite scenes from all the series. He lists among these the farm animals driven insane by the food product tomacco ("E-I-E-I-(Annoyed Grunt)") and the portrayal of the dolphins enslaving mankind ("Treehouse of Horror XI"). He also identifies the episode "Worst Episode Ever" as one he particularly enjoyed, calling it "a very special story."

== The Simpsons One Step Beyond Forever!: A Complete Guide to Our Favorite Family …Continued Yet Again ==
The Simpsons One Step Beyond Forever!: A Complete Guide to Our Favorite Family ...Continued Yet Again is the third sequel to the Simpsons episode guide The Simpsons: A Complete Guide to Our Favorite Family. It was edited by Jesse L. McCann and like its predecessors, has an episode-by-episode guide to seasons 13 and 14 of The Simpsons. Each season begins with production art and ends with character designs. The first episode covered in the book is "Treehouse of Horror XII", the last being "Moe Baby Blues". Each episode guide includes quotes, a "Stuff You May Have Missed" section, and references to films, television shows, and books. As in the previous three books, each episode includes a character profile sidebar. All special guest stars appearing in seasons 13–14 are listed with the episode they appeared in. The last pages of the book include character designs, couch gags, Homer's "D'oh!"s and "Mmmmm"s, an Itchy & Scratchy filmography, a "Who Does What Voice" section, songs featured on the show, and Church marquees.

== Simpsons World: The Ultimate Episode Guide: Seasons 1–20 ==
Simpsons World: The Ultimate Episode Guide: Seasons 1–20 is the fourth sequel to the Simpsons episode guide The Simpsons: A Complete Guide to Our Favorite Family. At 1200 pages long, the book covers The Simpsons shorts from The Tracey Ullman Show ("Good Night" through "TV Simpsons") as well seasons one to twenty ("Simpsons Roasting on an Open Fire" through "Coming to Homerica"). The book was released on October 26, 2010, in the United States, and two days later in the UK. Like its predecessors, it uses the same basic structure; however, the guide to each episode occupies two pages, giving every episode from seasons one to ten double pages. The book also contains other Simpsons facts and lists, such as a list of every couch gag, every time Homer has said "D'oh!" or "Mmm…", and a list of the show's celebrity guest stars.

== Editions ==
Publishing date	Seasons covered	Book title	Edition	Tag	Imprint	Pages
October 3, 1997	1–8 (178 episodes)	The Simpsons: A Complete Guide to Our Favorite Family	1st	USA	HarperPerennial	256
November 11, 1997	1–8 (178 episodes)	The Simpsons: A Complete Guide to Our Favorite Family	1st	UK	HarperCollins Entertainment	256
November 3, 1999	9–10 (48 episodes)	The Simpsons Forever!: A Complete Guide to Our Favorite Family ...Continued	1st	USA	HarperPerennial	96
November 3, 1999	9–10 (48 episodes)	The Simpsons Forever!: A Complete Guide to Our Favorite Family ...Continued	1st	UK	HarperCollins Entertainment	96
October 22, 2002	11–12 (43 episodes)	The Simpsons Beyond Forever!: A Complete Guide to Our Favorite Family ...Still Continued	1st	USA	HarperPerennial	128
October 11, 2005	13–14 (44 episodes)	The Simpsons One Step Beyond Forever!: A Complete Guide to Our Favorite Family ...Continued Yet Again	1st	USA	Harper	128
October 26, 2010	1–20 (441 episodes)	Simpsons World: The Ultimate Episode Guide, Seasons 1–20	1st	USA	Harper	1200
