= Homer Simpson =

Character from The Simpsons franchise

- The Simpsons character
- First appearance: "Good Night"; The Tracey Ullman Show; April 19, 1987
- Created by: Matt Groening
- Designed by: Matt Groening
- Voiced by: Dan Castellaneta

In-universe information
- Full name: Homer Jay Simpson
- Alias: Max Power (in "Homer to the Max")
- Occupation: Safety inspector at Springfield Nuclear Power Plant; Various others (temporary)
- Family: Abraham Simpson (father); Mona Simpson (mother; deceased); Herb Powell (paternal half-brother); Abbey (paternal half-sister)
- Spouses: Marge Bouvier; Amber Simpson (bigamous ex-wife)
- Children: Bart Simpson; Lisa Simpson; Maggie Simpson; Various others (as sperm donor)
- Relatives: Orville Simpson (grandfather; deceased); Yuma Simpson (grandmother; deceased); Cyrus Simpson (uncle); Tyrone Simpson (uncle); Chet Simpson (uncle); Hortense Simpson (aunt)
- Home: 742 Evergreen Terrace, Springfield, United States
- Nationality: American

Homer Jay Simpson is a fictional character and the protagonist of the American animated sitcom The Simpsons. Part of the titular family, Homer made his television debut in the short "Good Night" on The Tracey Ullman Show on April 19, 1987. Cartoonist Matt Groening crafted and designed Homer while waiting in the lobby of James L. Brooks's office. Initially called to pitch a series of shorts based on his comic strip Life in Hell, Groening instead developed a new set of characters. After two years on The Tracey Ullman Show, the Simpson family received their own series, which premiered on Fox on December 17, 1989.

Homer is the patriarch of the family; he is married to Marge, with whom he has three children, Bart, Lisa, and Maggie. As the family's primary provider, Homer primarily works as a safety inspector at the Springfield Nuclear Power Plant. He represents numerous American working-class stereotypes: he is overweight, balding, immature, unintelligent, outspoken, aggressive, lazy, ignorant, unprofessional, and deeply fond of beer, junk food, and television. Despite these flaws, Homer is fundamentally a kind-hearted man and fiercely protective of his family, particularly during crucial moments.

In the short films and early episodes of The Simpsons, Dan Castellaneta voiced Homer with a loose impression of Walter Matthau. However, starting with the second season of the full-length series, Homer's voice transformed into a stronger tone to effectively express a wider range of emotions. Homer has also been featured in various Simpsons-related media, such as video games, The Simpsons Movie (2007), The Simpsons Ride, commercials, and comic books, and has sparked a wide array of merchandise. His iconic catchphrase, the annoyed grunt "D'oh!", has been recognized in linguistics, appearing in The New Oxford Dictionary of English since 1998 and the Oxford English Dictionary since 2001.

Homer is regarded as one of the most iconic and influential television characters of all time and is widely recognized as an American cultural icon. In 2007, Entertainment Weekly ranked Homer ninth on their list of the "50 Greatest TV Icons," and in 2010, placed him first on their list of the "Top 100 Characters of the Past Twenty Years". The Sunday Times referred to him as "the greatest comic creation of [modern] time", while TV Guide, in 2002, referred to him as the second-greatest cartoon character (after Bugs Bunny). Castellaneta has received four Primetime Emmy Awards for Outstanding Voice-Over Performance, along with a special-achievement Annie Award. In 2000, Homer and the family were honored with a star on the Hollywood Walk of Fame.

== Role in The Simpsons ==
Homer Jay Simpson is the bumbling husband of Marge and the father of Bart, Lisa, and Maggie Simpson. He is the son of Mona and Abraham "Grampa" Simpson. Over the first 400 episodes of The Simpsons, Homer held over 188 different jobs. His primary role is as a nuclear safety inspector at the Springfield Nuclear Power Plant in Sector 7-G. This position, which he is unqualified for, often sees him neglecting his duties or falling asleep on the job. His boss, Mr. Burns, frequently ignores or forgets his existence. Creator Matt Groening chose the nuclear plant as Homer's workplace to provide opportunities for comedic chaos. Although Homer's numerous other jobs each last only one episode, earlier seasons often explained how he was fired from the plant and rehired. In later episodes, these transitions became more impulsive, with his side ventures occurring without reference to his regular employment.

The Simpsons employs a floating timeline, where characters either do not age or age minimally. Therefore, the show is always assumed to be set in the current year. Despite the show's flexible timeline, several episodes link events in Homer's life to specific time periods. In "Mother Simpson" (season seven, 1995), Homer's mother, Mona, is portrayed as a radical who went into hiding in 1969 after a run-in with the law. "The Way We Was" (season two, 1991) depicts Homer falling in love with Marge as a senior at Springfield High School in 1974. Similarly, "I Married Marge" (season three, 1991) implies that Marge became pregnant with Bart in 1980. However, "That '90s Show" (season 19, 2008) contradicts these events, depicting Homer and Marge as a twentysomething, childless couple in the early 1990s. This inconsistency deepens in "Do Pizza Bots Dream of Electric Guitars" (season 32, 2021), which reimagines Homer's adolescence as occurring in the 1990s. Showrunner Matt Selman has addressed these contradictions, stating that no version is "official continuity" and that "they all kind of happened in their imaginary world", allowing viewers to choose the version they prefer.

Homer's age has fluctuated throughout The Simpsons due to its floating timeline. In the early episodes, he was thirty-four, increasing to thirty-six in season four, thirty-eight and thirty-nine in season eight, and forty by season eighteen, though these ages are inconsistent even within those seasons. In the episode "Duffless" (season four, 1993), Homer's driver's license lists his birthdate as May 12, 1956, making him 36 at the time. During Bill Oakley and Josh Weinstein's tenure as showrunners, they aged Homer to thirty-eight, reflecting their own aging and perception of the character. According to the episode guides The Simpsons: A Complete Guide to Our Favorite Family (1997) and Simpsons World: The Ultimate Episode Guide: Seasons 1–20 (2010), both authored by Groening, Homer's official age is 36. Homer stands 6 feet (1.83 m) tall and weighs between 239 and 260 lbs (108–120 kg).

== Character ==
=== Creation ===
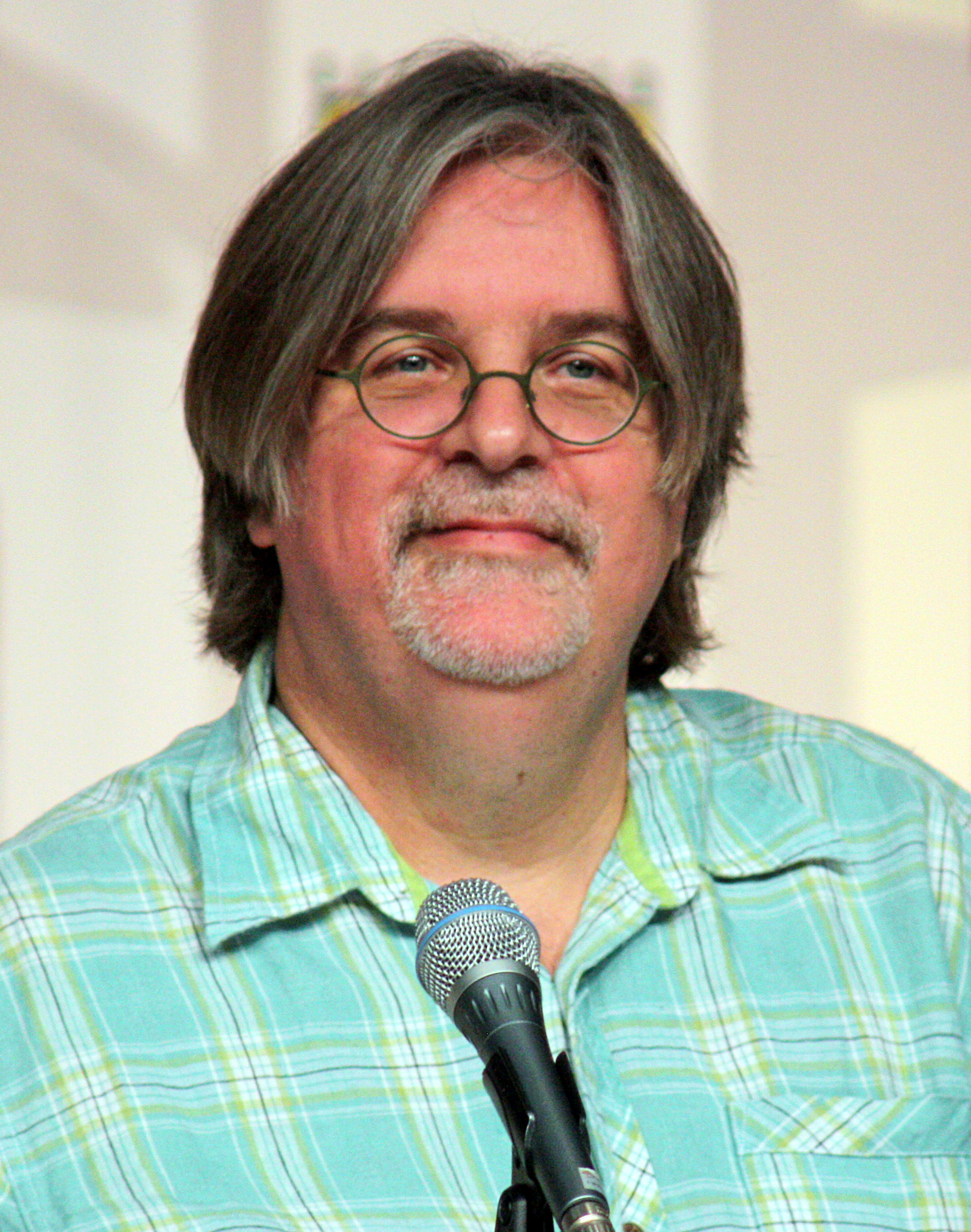
Matt Groening (pictured in 2009) conceived Homer in 1987.

Matt Groening first conceived Homer and the rest of the Simpson family in 1987 while waiting in the lobby of producer James L. Brooks's office. Groening was invited to pitch a series of animated shorts for The Tracey Ullman Show and initially planned to adapt his comic strip, Life in Hell. Upon realizing that adapting the strip would require him to relinquish publication rights, he quickly decided to create something new. Groening hastily sketched a concept for a dysfunctional family, naming the characters after members of his own family. Groening named Homer after his father, who himself had been named after the ancient Greek poet. Very little of Homer's character was inspired by Groening's father, and to emphasize that the significance of the name was minimal, Groening later named his own son Homer. Groening explained, "Homer originated with my goal to both amuse my real father, and just annoy him a little bit. My father was an athletic, creative, intelligent filmmaker and writer, and the only thing he had in common with Homer was a love of donuts". On the podcast WTF with Marc Maron, Groening stated in 2025 that the original inspiration for Homer Simpson came from the 1982 PBS documentary series Middletown about the city of Muncie, Indiana, which contains an episode featuring a Shakey's Pizza franchise manager who employed his own kids to make ends meet.

While Groening has often mentioned that Homer was named after his father, he has also stated in some interviews that the character Homer Simpson from Nathanael West's 1939 novel The Day of the Locust and its 1975 film adaptation was an inspiration. In a 2012 interview with the Smithsonian Magazine, Groening clarified, "I took that name from a minor character in the novel The Day of the Locust [...] Since Homer was my father's name, and I thought Simpson was a funny name in that it had the word "simp" in it, which is short for "simpleton"—I just went with it". Homer's middle initial "J", which stands for "Jay", is a nod to animated characters like Bullwinkle J. Moose and Rocket J. Squirrel from The Rocky and Bullwinkle Show, whose middle initial was a tribute to series creator Jay Ward. Homer first appeared alongside the Simpson family on April 19, 1987, in The Tracey Ullman Show short "Good Night". On December 17, 1989, these shorts were developed into The Simpsons, a half-hour series on the Fox Broadcasting Company, where Homer and the Simpson family became the central characters.

=== Design ===
Homer's design has been revised several times over the course of the series. Left to right: Homer as he appeared in "Good Night" (1987), "Bathtime" (1989), and "There's No Disgrace Like Home" (1990).

Homer's typical attire includes a short-sleeved white shirt with an open collar, blue pants, and gray shoes. He is overweight and bald, with a fringe of hair around the sides and back of his head and two curly strands on top.

The Simpson family was designed to be easily recognizable in silhouette. The characters were initially crudely drawn because Groening submitted rough sketches to the animators, expecting them to refine the designs; instead, the animators simply traced over his original drawings. Homer's appearance has been noted for its resemblance—intentional or not—to the cartoon character Adamsson, created by Swedish cartoonist Oscar Jacobsson in 1920. When Groening originally designed Homer, he incorporated his initials into the character's features: the hairline resembled an "M", and the right ear resembled a "G". While this design was eventually modified to make the ear appear more natural, Groening continues to draw it as a "G" in sketches for fans. Director Mark Kirkland has described Homer's head shape as resembling a tube-shaped coffee can topped with a salad bowl.

During The Simpsons shorts, animators experimented with Homer's mouth movements, at one point allowing his mouth to stretch beyond his beard line. However, this approach was abandoned when it became overly exaggerated. In early episodes, Homer's hair was more rounded to suggest a disheveled look, but it evolved into the consistently pointed style seen today. During the first three seasons, close-up shots of Homer occasionally included small lines meant to represent eyebrows. Groening disliked this detail, and the lines were eventually removed.

In the season seven (1995) episode "Treehouse of Horror VI", Bart, alongside Homer, was rendered as a three-dimensional character for the first time in the "Homer^{3}" segment of the episode. The computer animation was provided by Pacific Data Images. In the final minute of the segment, the three-dimensional Homer transitions into a live-action setting, finding himself in real-world Los Angeles. Directed by David Mirkin, this marked the first instance of a Simpsons character appearing in the real world within the series. In "Lisa's Wedding" (season six, 1995), which is set fifteen years in the future, Homer's design was modified to reflect his older age. Changes included increased weight, the removal of one hair from the top of his head, and the addition of an extra line under his eye. This older design has since been used in subsequent flashforward episodes.

=== Voice ===
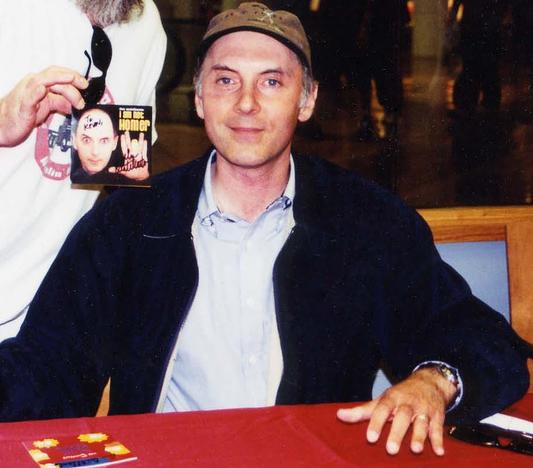
Dan Castellaneta (pictured in 2002) voices Homer.

Homer's voice is provided by Dan Castellaneta. Castellaneta also voices several other characters on The Simpsons, including Grampa Simpson, Krusty the Clown, Barney Gumble, Groundskeeper Willie, Mayor Quimby, and Hans Moleman.

Castellaneta, a regular cast member on The Tracey Ullman Show, had prior experience in voice-over work, which he had done in Chicago alongside his wife, Deb Lacusta. When voices were needed for The Simpsons shorts, the producers chose Castellaneta and fellow cast member Julie Kavner to voice Homer and Marge, respectively, opting not to hire additional actors. In the shorts and the first season of the half-hour series, Homer's voice differed noticeably from its later incarnation. Initially, it was modeled as a loose impression of Walter Matthau but Castellaneta found it challenging to maintain the Matthau-inspired tone during the nine- to ten-hour recording sessions and sought a more sustainable approach. By the second and third seasons, Castellaneta had "dropped the voice down" and developed it into a more versatile and humorous style, enabling Homer to express a broader range of emotions.

Castellaneta's natural speaking voice bears no resemblance to Homer's. To create Homer's voice, Castellaneta lowers his chin to his chest and adopts what he describes as a state of "letting his I.Q. go". This method has even led to ad-libs, including the famous "S-M-R-T; I mean, S-M-A-R-T!" line from "Homer Goes to College" (season five, 1993), which stemmed from a genuine recording mistake. Castellaneta prefers to stay in character during recording sessions and visualizes scenes to deliver the appropriate vocal performance. Despite Homer's widespread fame, Castellaneta says he is rarely recognized in public—unless by an especially dedicated fan. In "Homer's Barbershop Quartet" (season five, 1993), Homer's voice was partially performed by someone other than Castellaneta. The episode follows Homer forming a barbershop quartet called the Be Sharps, with his singing voice provided at times by a member of the Dapper Dans. The Dapper Dans recorded the singing parts for all four members of the group, blending their vocals with the regular voice actors. Often, a primary voice actor sang the melody while the Dapper Dans provided harmonic backup.

Castellaneta was initially paid US$30,000 per episode for his work on The Simpsons until 1998. That year, a pay dispute arose, during which Fox threatened to replace the six main voice actors and even began preparing for new casting. The conflict was ultimately resolved, and Castellaneta's salary increased to $125,000 per episode. In 2004, the voice cast pushed for higher wages, seeking $360,000 per episode. After a brief argument, the dispute was settled, and Castellaneta's pay was raised to $250,000 per episode. In 2008, further negotiations increased the cast's salaries to approximately $400,000 per episode. However, in 2011, Fox demanded production cost reductions, threatening to cancel the series if costs were not cut. In response, Castellaneta and the other main cast members agreed to a 30 percent pay reduction, lowering their per-episode earnings to just over $300,000. According to Backstage, he was the sixth highest-paid voice actor by late 2024.

=== Character development ===
Executive producer Al Jean observes that in The Simpsons writers' room, "everyone loves writing for Homer", with many of his antics inspired by the writers' own experiences. In the show's early seasons, Bart was the main character, but by the fourth season, Homer took on a more prominent role. Groening explained this shift: "With Homer, there's just a wider range of jokes you can do. And there are far more drastic consequences to Homer's stupidity. There's only so far you can go with a juvenile delinquent. We wanted Bart to do anything up to the point of him being tried in court an adult. But Homer is an adult, and his boneheaded-ness is funnier. [...] Homer is launching himself headfirst into every single impulsive thought that occurs to him".

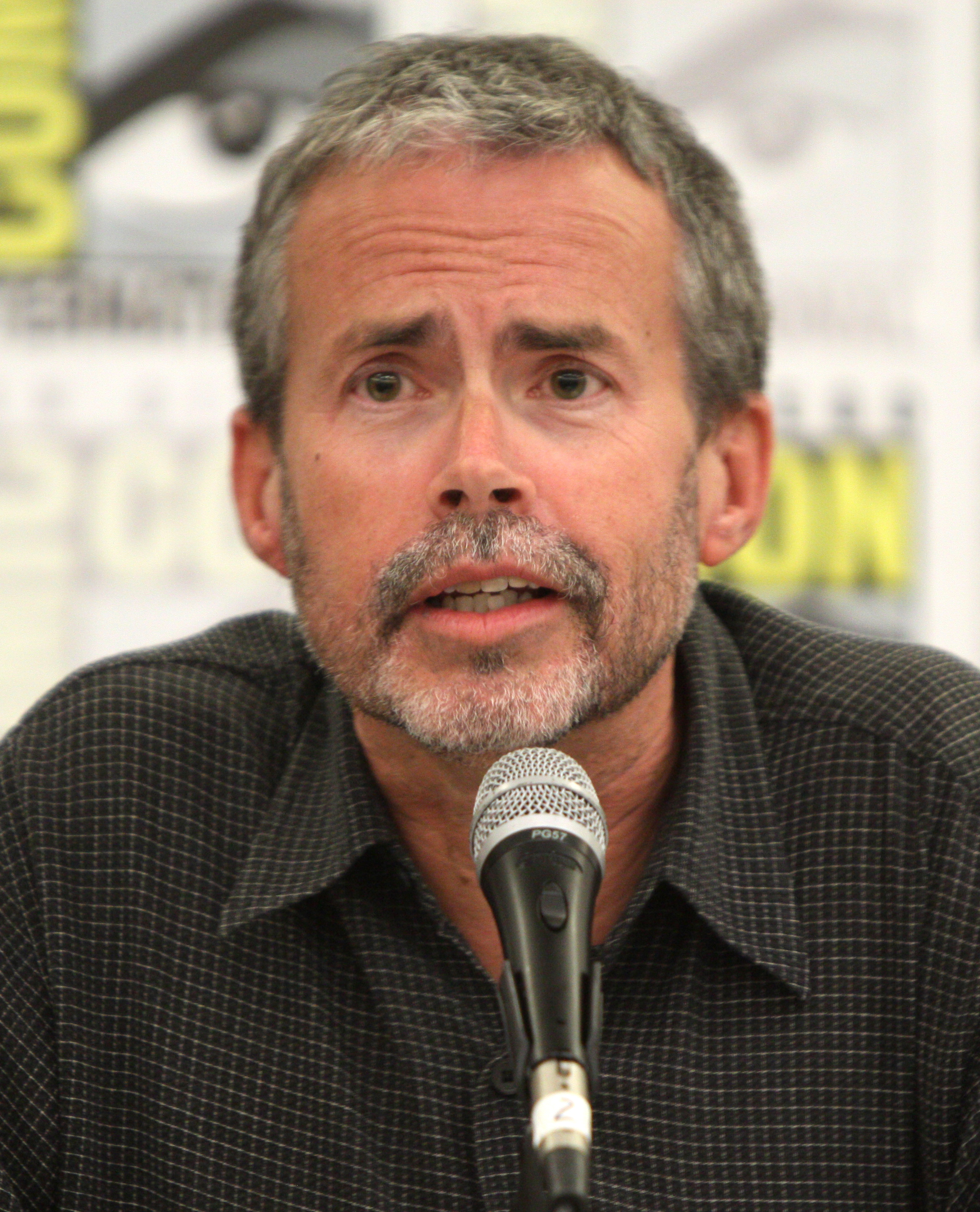
Some argued that under Mike Scully's (pictured) tenure as executive producer, Homer exhibited a more aggressive "jerkass" attitude.

Homer's character has evolved significantly over the course of The Simpsons. Initially, he was portrayed as "very angry" and domineering toward Bart, but these traits were softened as his personality was developed further. In the early seasons, Homer often worried that his family might embarrass him, but in later episodes, he became less concerned with others' opinions. During the show's first years, Homer was depicted as dim-witted yet well-meaning. As noted by Jon Bonné of Today, somewhere around the seventh season, his behavior shifted toward being a "boorish, self-aggrandizing oaf". Chris Suellentrop of Slate observed, "Under Mike Scully's tenure [as executive producer], The Simpsons became, well, a cartoon. [...] Episodes that once would have ended with Homer and Marge bicycling into the sunset now end with Homer blowing a tranquilizer dart into Marge's neck". Fans have labeled this version of the character as "Jerkass Homer". At recording sessions, Castellaneta has occasionally rejected lines from the script that he felt made Homer too cruel. He believes Homer is "boorish and unthinking, but he'd never be mean on purpose". When The Simpsons Movie (2007) was being edited, several scenes were adjusted to make Homer more sympathetic.

Over the years, the writers have portrayed Homer with increasingly declining intelligence. They explain this was not done intentionally but became necessary to surpass earlier jokes. For instance, in "When You Dish Upon a Star" (season 10, 1998), Homer admits he cannot read. Although this contradicts earlier scenes where Homer is shown reading, the writers decided to keep the gag because they found it funny. The team often debates how far to take Homer's stupidity, with one suggested guideline being that "he can never forget his own name".

=== Personality ===
The comedic appeal of Homer's character stems from his frequent displays of bumbling stupidity, laziness, and explosive temper. With a low intelligence level, director David Silverman has described him as "creatively brilliant in his stupidity". Homer is characterized by his immense apathy towards work, overweight body, love for food, and short attention span. He frequently spends his evenings drinking Duff Beer at Moe's Tavern and, as depicted in the episode "Duffless" (season four, 1993), has exhibited signs of full-blown alcoholism. A recurring gag throughout the series involves Homer impulsively strangling Bart whenever he aggravates him, often accompanied by his catchphrase, "Why you little—!". According to series creator Groening, Homer's strangling of Bart was never meant to be premeditated, as that would make it seem sadistic. Instead, it was made that Homer acts purely on impulse, easily switching from anger to indifference. Groening initially considered making Homer always receive a punishment or having Bart retaliate, but this was discarded. In the episode "McMansion & Wife" (season 35, 2023), Homer states that he no longer strangles Bart, citing changing times. However, the show's executive producers later clarified that Homer still strangles Bart, humorously noting, "Homer Simpson was unavailable for comment as he was busy strangling Bart".

The first sketch of Homer strangling Bart, drawn in 1988

Homer has nuanced relationships with his family. His relationship with Bart is the most contentious; Bart frequently calls Homer by his first name rather than "Dad", and Homer often refers to him dismissively as "the boy". Homer frequently overlooks Lisa's talents but, when confronted with his neglect, goes out of his way to support her. The episode "And Maggie Makes Three" (season six, 1995) reveals she is the main reason Homer took and continues to work at his regular job. While Homer's thoughtless antics often frustrate his family, he has proven himself to be a loving husband; for instance, in "A Milhouse Divided" (season eight, 1996), Homer arranged a surprise second wedding with Marge to make up for their unsatisfactory first ceremony. He has a strained relationship with his father, Abraham "Grampa" Simpson, and Homer quickly placed him in a nursing home.

Homer was described by The Times as "a (happy) slave to his various appetites". He is known for his consistent ignorance, forgetfulness, and general stupidity. Homer's low intelligence quotient (IQ) of 55 has been attributed to several factors, including the hereditary "Simpson gene" (which causes male family members to become increasingly unintelligent over time) and a crayon lodged in his brain's frontal lobe. In the episode "HOMR" (season 12, 2001), Homer has the crayon removed, temporarily raising his IQ to 105. This improvement allows him to bond with Lisa, but his newfound intelligence ultimately makes him unhappy, leading him to have the crayon reinserted. In 2015, it was revealed that Homer has narcolepsy, a sleep disorder.

Producer Mike Reiss said Homer was his favorite Simpsons character to write: "Homer's just a comedy writer's dream. He has everything wrong with him, every comedy trope. He's fat and bald and stupid and lazy and angry and an alcoholic. I'm pretty sure he embodies all seven deadly sins". John Swartzwelder, who wrote 60 episodes, said he wrote Homer as if he were "a big talking dog ... One moment he's the saddest man in the world, because he's just lost his job, or dropped his sandwich, or accidentally killed his family. Then, the next moment, he's the happiest man in the world, because he's just found a penny — maybe under one of his dead family members ... If you write him as a dog you'll never go wrong". Reiss felt this was insightful, saying: "Homer is just pure emotion, no long-term memory, everything is instant gratification. And, you know, has good dog qualities, too. I think, loyalty, friendliness, and just kind of continuous optimism".

== Reception ==
=== Cultural influence and commendations ===
Homer is widely regarded as one of the most popular and iconic characters in television history. In 2007, USA Today recognized Homer Simpson as one of the "top 25 most influential people of the past 25 years", stating that he "epitomized the irony and irreverence at the core of American humor". In 2003, Robert Thompson, director of Syracuse University's Center for the Study of Popular Television, predicts that "three centuries from now, English professors are going to be regarding Homer Simpson as one of the greatest creations in human storytelling". Animation historian Jerry Beck described Homer as one of the best animated characters, saying, "you know someone like it, or you identify with (it)", which he believed is key to a classic character. The Sunday Times has hailed Homer as "the greatest comic creation of [modern] time," emphasizing his universal appeal. The article noted, "Every age needs its great, consoling failure, its lovable, pretension-free mediocrity. And we have ours in Homer Simpson".

Homer's impact on comedy and culture has been significant. In 2010, Entertainment Weekly named him "the greatest character of the last 20 years". In TV Guide's 2002 list of the "Top 50 Greatest Cartoon Characters", he was ranked second, behind Bugs Bunny. He also placed fifth on Bravo's "100 Greatest TV Characters", one of only four animated characters included. Homer topped a Channel 4 poll ranking the greatest television characters of all time. In 2007, Entertainment Weekly ranked Homer ninth on its list of the "50 Greatest TV Icons" and later placed him first on its 2010 list of the "Top 100 Characters of the Past Twenty Years". British polls conducted by the BBC also named Homer the "greatest American" and the fictional character voters would most like to see as President of the United States. His relationship with Marge was further recognized in TV Guide's list of "The Best TV Couples of All Time". In 2022, Paste writers ranked Homer as the second-greatest cartoon character of all time.

Although Homer is often regarded as a reflection of American culture, his influence extends worldwide. In 2003, Groening revealed that his father, Homer Groening—after whom the character was named—was Canadian, suggesting that Homer could also be considered Canadian. As a result, the character was granted honorary citizenship in Winnipeg, Manitoba, based on the belief that Homer Groening was from there, though records indicate he was actually born in Saskatchewan. In 2007, as part of a promotion for The Simpsons Movie, an image of Homer was painted next to the Cerne Abbas Giant in Dorset, England. This sparked controversy among local neopagan groups, who performed "rain magic" in an attempt to wash the image away.

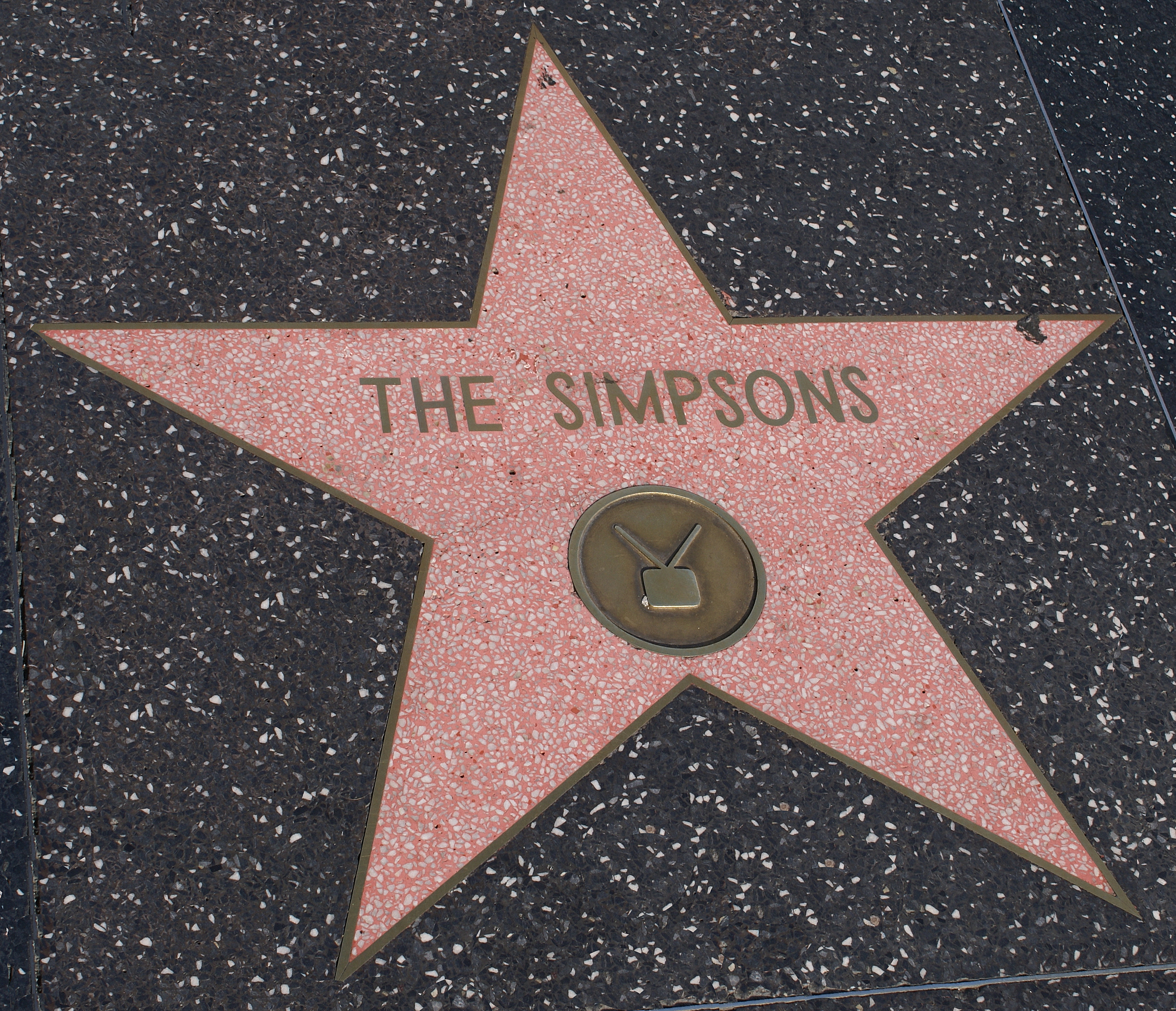
The Simpsons has been awarded a star on the Hollywood Walk of Fame.

Castellaneta has received multiple awards for his portrayal of Homer, including four Primetime Emmy Awards for "Outstanding Voice-Over Performance". He won in 1992 for "Lisa's Pony", in 1993 for "Mr. Plow", in 2004 for "Today I Am a Clown", and in 2009 for "Father Knows Worst". However, his 2004 Emmy win was for voicing various characters, not solely Homer. In 2010, Castellaneta received a fifth Emmy nomination for his performances as both Homer and Grampa Simpson in "Thursdays with Abie". Castellaneta was honored with an Annie Award in 1993 for "Outstanding Individual Achievement in the Field of Animation" for his work on The Simpsons. In 2004, he and Julie Kavner (the voice of Marge) won a Young Artist Award for "Most Popular Mom & Dad in a TV Series". In 2000, Homer and the rest of the Simpson family were awarded a star on the Hollywood Walk of Fame at 7021 Hollywood Boulevard. Homer has also been referenced in scientific literature, particularly in discussions of cognitive function. A 2010 study conducted at Emory University found that the RGS14 gene appeared to impair cognitive development in mice—while disabling the gene led to improved cognitive abilities. This led researchers to nickname it the "Homer Simpson gene".

=== Analysis ===
Homer is an "everyman" and embodies several American stereotypes of working class blue-collar men: he is crude, overweight, incompetent, dim-witted, childish, clumsy and a borderline alcoholic. Groening describes him as "completely ruled by his impulses". Castellaneta calls him "a dog trapped in a man's body", adding, "He's incredibly loyal—not entirely clean—but you gotta love him."

In his book Planet Simpson, author Chris Turner describes Homer as "the most American of the Simpsons" and believes that while the other Simpson family members could be changed to other nationalities, Homer is "pure American". In the book God in the Details: American Religion in Popular Culture, the authors comment that "Homer's progress (or lack thereof) reveals a character who can do the right thing, if accidentally or begrudgingly." The book The Simpsons and Philosophy: The D'oh! of Homer includes a chapter analyzing Homer's character from the perspective of Aristotelian virtue ethics. Raja Halwani writes that Homer's "love of life" is an admirable character trait, "for many people are tempted to see in Homer nothing but buffoonery and immorality. ... He is not politically correct, he is more than happy to judge others, and he certainly does not seem to be obsessed with his health. These qualities might not make Homer an admirable person, but they do make him admirable in some ways, and, more importantly, makes us crave him and the Homer Simpsons of this world." In 2008, Entertainment Weekly justified designating The Simpsons as a television classic by stating, "we all hail Simpson patriarch Homer because his joy is as palpable as his stupidity is stunning".

In the season eight episode "Homer's Enemy" the writers decided to examine "what it would be like to actually work alongside Homer Simpson". The episode explores the possibilities of a realistic character with a strong work ethic named Frank Grimes placed alongside Homer in a work environment. In the episode, Homer is portrayed as an everyman and the embodiment of the American spirit; however, in some scenes his negative characteristics and silliness are prominently highlighted. By the end of the episode, Grimes, a hard working and persevering "real American hero", has become the villain; the viewer is intended to be pleased that Homer has emerged victorious.

In Gilligan Unbound, author Paul Arthur Cantor states that he believes Homer's devotion to his family has added to the popularity of the character. He writes, "Homer is the distillation of pure fatherhood. ... This is why, for all his stupidity, bigotry and self-centered quality, we cannot hate Homer. He continually fails at being a good father, but he never gives up trying, and in some basic and important sense that makes him a good father." The Sunday Times remarked "Homer is good because, above all, he is capable of great love. When the chips are down, he always does the right thing by his children—he is never unfaithful in spite of several opportunities."

=== D'oh! ===
Homer's main and most famous catchphrase, the annoyed grunt "D'oh!", is typically uttered when he injures himself, realizes that he has done something stupid, or when something bad has happened or is about to happen to him. During the voice recording session for a Tracey Ullman Show short, Homer was required to utter what was written in the script as an "annoyed grunt". Dan Castellaneta rendered it as a drawn out "d'ooooooh". This was inspired by Jimmy Finlayson, the mustachioed Scottish actor who appeared in 33 Laurel and Hardy films. Finlayson had used the term as a minced oath to stand in for the word "Damn!" Matt Groening felt that it would better suit the timing of animation if it were spoken faster. Castellaneta then shortened it to a quickly uttered "D'oh!". The first intentional use of "D'oh!" occurred in the Ullman short "The Krusty the Clown Show" (1989), and its first usage in the series was in the series premiere, "Simpsons Roasting on an Open Fire".

"D'oh!" was first added to The New Oxford Dictionary of English in 1998. It is defined as an interjection "used to comment on an action perceived as foolish or stupid". In 2001, "D'oh!" was added to the Oxford English Dictionary, without the apostrophe ("Doh!"). The definition of the word is "expressing frustration at the realization that things have turned out badly or not as planned, or that one has just said or done something foolish". In 2006, "D'oh!" was placed in sixth position on TV Land's list of the 100 greatest television catchphrases. "D'oh!" is also included in The Oxford Dictionary of Quotations. The book includes several other quotations from Homer, including "Kids, you tried your best and you failed miserably. The lesson is never try", from "Burns' Heir" (season five, 1994) as well as "Kids are the best, Apu. You can teach them to hate the things you hate. And they practically raise themselves, what with the Internet and all", from "Eight Misbehavin'" (season 11, 1999). Both quotes entered the dictionary in August 2007.

== Merchandising ==
Homer and other members of his family have been featured in a variety of The Simpsons-related merchandise, which includes dolls, napkins, air fresheners, cups, chewing gum, beach towels, sleeping bags, snow boots, rubber sponge balls, license-plate frames, scratch paper, laminated magnets, and handheld pinball games. One book, The Homer Book (2004), has been published on the character, which discusses his personality and attributes. The News Letter's Simon Hunter described it as "an entertaining little book for occasional reading" and was listed as one of "the most interesting books of 2004" by The Chattanoogan.

Homer has appeared in commercials for several brands, including Pepsi, Coca-Cola, and Kodak. Homer and other Simpsons characters appeared in television commercials for Nestlé's Butterfinger candy bars from 1988 to 2001. Groening later noted that the success of the Butterfinger commercials played a significant role in Fox's decision to greenlight the half-hour series. In 2001, Kelloggs launched a brand of cereal called "Homer's Cinnamon Donut Cereal", which was available for a limited time. In June 2009, Dutch automotive navigation systems manufacturer TomTom announced that Homer would be added to its downloadable GPS voice lineup. Homer's voice, recorded by Dan Castellaneta, features several in-character comments such as "Take the third right. We might find an ice cream truck! Mmm... ice cream."

Homer has appeared in other media relating to The Simpsons. He has appeared in every one of The Simpsons video games, including The Simpsons (1991) and The Simpsons Game (2007). Alongside the television series, Homer regularly appeared in issues of Simpsons Comics, which were published from November 29, 1993, until October 17, 2018. Homer also plays a role in The Simpsons Ride, launched in 2008 at Universal Studios Florida and Hollywood. On December 9, 2024, Monday Night Football hosted an animated Simpsons version of the Cincinnati Bengals-Dallas Cowboys game, which paralleled the events on the field. In November 2025, Homer appeared in the Fortnite x Simpsons mini season, as a skin for players to purchase.

== Bibliography ==
- Arras, Paul (2018). The Lonely Nineties. Springer International Publishing. ISBN 978-3-319-93094-7.
- Brown, Alan S.; Logan, Chris (2009). The Psychology of the Simpsons. BenBella Books. ISBN 978-1-935251-39-2.
- Browning, John Edgar; Picart, Kay (2014). Dracula in Visual Media. McFarland & Company. ISBN 978-0-7864-6201-8.
- Buchan, Suzanne (2007). Animated 'Worlds'. Indiana University Press. ISBN 978-0-86196-927-2.
- Cantor, Paul Arthur (2001). Gilligan Unbound: Pop Culture in the Age of Globalization. Rowman & Littlefield. pp. 74–76. ISBN 978-0-7425-0779-1.
- Croteau, David; Hoynes, William (2003). Media/Society. Sage Publishing. ISBN 978-0-7619-8773-4.
- Davis, Amy M.; Gilboy, Jemma; Zborowski, James (2015). "How Time Works in The Simpsons". Animation. 10 (3). Sage Publications: 175–188. doi:10.1177/1746847715602403. ISSN 1746-8477.
- Duffy, Margaret; Thorson, Esther (2015). Persuasion Ethics Today. Taylor & Francis. ISBN 978-1-317-30964-2.
- Farrokh Baroughi, Alireza; Craver, Scott (March 4, 2015). "The non-trusty clown attack on model-based speaker recognition systems". In Alattar, Adnan M.; Memon, Nasir D.; Heitzenrater, Chad D. (eds.). Media Watermarking, Security, and Forensics 2015. Proceedings of SPIE. Vol. 9409. Bibcode:2015SPIE.9409E..04F. doi:10.1117/12.2083412.
- Fink, Moritz (2019). The Simpsons. Rowman & Littlefield. ISBN 978-1-5381-1617-3.
- Friedrich, Daniel; Colmenares, Erica (2017). Resonances of El Chavo del Ocho in Latin American Childhood, Schooling, and Societies. Bloomsbury Publishing. ISBN 978-1-4742-9888-9.
- Gitlin, Martin (2013). The Greatest Sitcoms of All Time. Scarecrow Press. ISBN 978-0-8108-8725-1.
- Glushko, Robert J. (2013). The Discipline of Organizing. MIT Press. ISBN 978-0-262-31398-8.
- Gray, Jonathan (2012). Watching with The Simpsons. Taylor & Francis. ISBN 978-1-134-23320-5.
- Groening, Matt (2010). Richmond, Ray; Gimple, Scott M.; McCann, Jessie L.; Seghers, Christine; Bates, James W. (eds.). Simpsons World: The Ultimate Episode Guide: Seasons 1–20 (1st ed.). HarperCollins. ISBN 9780061711282.
- Groening, Matt (2001). Simpsons Comics Royale. HarperPerennial. ISBN 978-0-00-711854-0.
- Groening, Matt (1997). Richmond, Ray; Coffman, Antonia (eds.). The Simpsons: A Complete Guide to Our Favorite Family (1st ed.). HarperPerennial. ISBN 978-0-06-095252-5. LCCN 98141857. OCLC 37796735. OL 433519M.
- Halwani, Raja (1999). "Homer and Aristotle". In Irwin, William; Conrad, Mark T.; Skoble, Aeon (eds.). The Simpsons and Philosophy: The D'oh! of Homer. Open Court. ISBN 978-0-8126-9433-8.
- Heerden, Bill van (September 2, 2015). Film and Television In-Jokes. McFarland & Company. ISBN 978-1-4766-1206-5.
- Irwin, William; Conard, Mark T.; Skoble, Aeon J. (2010). The Simpsons and Philosophy. Open Court. ISBN 978-1-4596-0115-4.
- Janak, Edward A.; Blum, Denise F. (2013). The Pedagogy of Pop. Rowman & Littlefield. ISBN 978-0-7391-7600-9.
- Lawson, Tim; Persons, Alisa (2009). The Magic Behind the Voices. University Press of Mississippi. ISBN 978-1-4968-0122-7.
- MacPherson, Sarah E.; Sala, Sergio Della; Cox, Simon; Girardi, Alessandra; Iveson, Matthew H. (2015). Handbook of Frontal Lobe Assessment. Oxford University Press. ISBN 978-0-19-966952-3. OCLC 910931351.
- Mazur, Eric Michael; McCarthy, Kate (2001). God in the Details: American Religion in Popular Culture. Routledge. ISBN 978-0-415-92564-8.
- Martone, Eric (2016). Italian Americans. Bloomsbury Publishing. ISBN 978-1-61069-995-2.
- Jackson, Ronald L.; Moshin, Jamie E. (2013). Communicating Marginalized Masculinities. Routledge. ISBN 978-0-415-62307-0.
- Nodelman, Perry (2008). The Hidden Adult. Johns Hopkins University Press. ISBN 978-0-8018-8980-6. OCLC 183179540.
- Ott, Brian L. (2008). The Small Screen. John Wiley & Sons. ISBN 978-0-470-76637-8.
- Pike, Deidre M. (2014). Enviro-Toons. McFarland & Company. ISBN 978-0-7864-9002-8.
- Reiss, Mike; Klickstein, Mathew (2018). Springfield confidential: jokes, secrets, and outright lies from a lifetime writing for the Simpsons. Dey Street Books. ISBN 978-0062748034.
- Roache, Rebecca (2023). For F*ck's Sake. Oxford University Press. ISBN 978-0-19-066506-7.
- Sito, Tom (2006). Drawing the Line: The Untold Story of the Animation Unions from Bosko to Bart Simpson. University Press of Kentucky. ISBN 978-0-8131-7148-7.
- Terrace, Vincent (2014). Encyclopedia of Television Shows, 1925 through 2010, 2d ed. McFarland & Company. ISBN 978-0-7864-8641-0.
- Terrace, Vincent (2020). The Television Treasury. McFarland & Company. ISBN 978-1-4766-8029-3.
- Turner, Chris (2004). Planet Simpson: How a Cartoon Masterpiece Documented an Era and Defined a Generation. Foreword by Douglas Coupland. (1st ed.). Random House Canada. ISBN 978-0-679-31318-2. OCLC 55682258.
- Waltonen, Karma; Du Vernay, Denise (2014). The Simpsons in the Classroom: Embiggening the Learning Experience with the Wisdom of Springfield. McFarland & Company. ISBN 978-0-7864-5692-5.
