= Ray Richmond =

American journalist (born 1957)

Ray Richmond (born October 19, 1957, in Whittier, California) is a globally syndicated critic and entertainment/media columnist. Richmond has also worked variously as a feature and entertainment writer, beat reporter and TV critic for a variety of publications including the Los Angeles Daily News, Daily Variety, the Orange County Register, the late Los Angeles Herald Examiner, Deadline Hollywood, Los Angeles magazine, Buzz, The Hollywood Reporter, the Los Angeles Times, New Times Los Angeles, DGA Magazine, and Penthouse.

== Education ==
Richmond is a graduate of California State University at Northridge.

== Career ==
In 2011, Ray Richmond became a Deadline Hollywood contributing writer and editor.

Richmond's long-running weekly column in The Hollywood Reporter was called "The Pulse" and was syndicated by Reuters.

In April 2006, Richmond created an online blog connected to The Hollywood Reporter. Going by the name of "Past Deadline," the blog has been on the cutting edge of breaking entertainment/celebrity related issues, such as the 2006 Mel Gibson DUI ordeal, and the Ellen Burstyn Emmy nomination controversy, stories which were subsequently picked up by the international press.

In 2009, Richmond left The Hollywood Reporter.

I no longer saw an upside to riding the Hindenburg.

During the summer of 2004, along with other outspoken colleagues, he appeared as himself in a well-received and controversial talkumentary called "Six Characters in Search of America".

Richmond has also served as a talent coordinator and segment producer for The Merv Griffin Show and had a short-lived stint as publicity VP for the cable network E!.

== Personal life ==
His son is radio personality Josh "Rawdog" Richmond (a.k.a. Tussin Wolf, The Illusionist, Trust Fund Baby, The Arabian Bush Baby, Rumbly Tumbly, Rumple Stumpskin, Tumble Bum, Raw Diggy, Tumbly Bumbly, Doc Banger, Sara) on The Jason Ellis Show.
