= The Simpsons Theme =

1989 television theme music by Danny Elfman

Song
- Released: December 17, 1989
- Genre: Theme music
- Composer: Danny Elfman

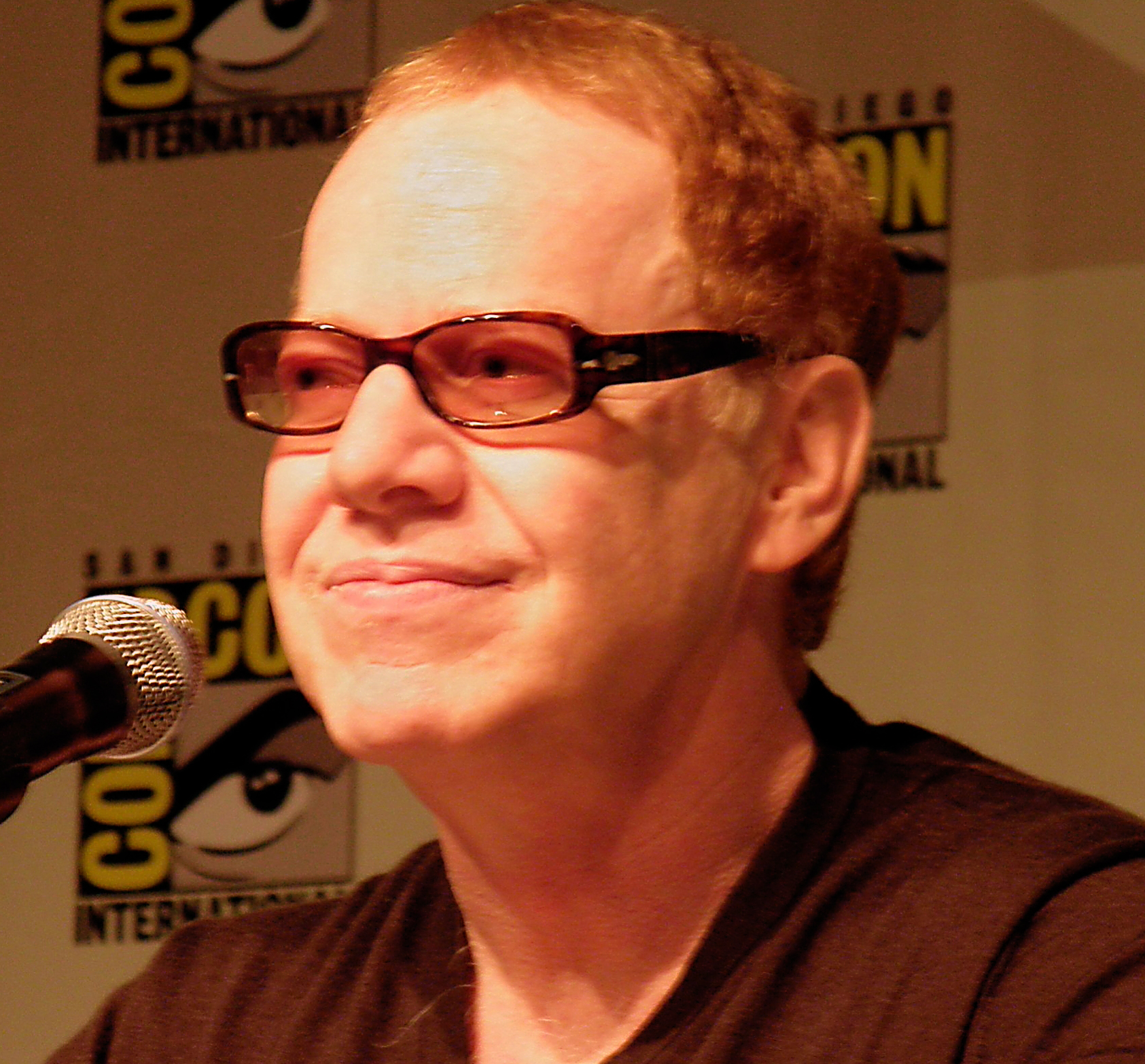
Danny Elfman composed "The Simpsons Theme"

"The Simpsons Theme", also referred to as "The Simpsons Main Title Theme" or "The Simpsons Theme song" in album releases, is the theme music of the animated television series The Simpsons. It was composed by Danny Elfman in 1989, after series creator Matt Groening approached him requesting a theme, and plays during the opening sequence of the show. The piece has been noted by Elfman as the most popular of his career.

== Recording ==
Opening bars

Groening showed Elfman a rough edit of the opening sequence in their initial meeting, where Elfman suggested "something retro" since it had "such a classic feel". He wrote the tune "in the car on the way home from the meeting" and recorded the demo in his home studio later that day. Elfman sang the three opening notes of The Simpsons himself with two friends. He described it as one of his easiest compositions. The theme is in the Lydian dominant scale (or 'acoustic scale').

The theme was re-arranged during season 2, and the current arrangement by Alf Clausen was introduced at the beginning of season 3. It has also been edited many times to coincide with edits of various lengths for the opening sequence, and there have been extended edits and re-recordings for lengthened opening sequences. Several versions of the saxophone solo riff, ostensibly played by character Lisa Simpson in the animated sequence, have been created over the course of the series.

A slightly different arrangement of the theme usually plays over the end credits of the show. Originally, there were two main versions of the closing theme, with the longer version ending in a lower key. Both versions were re-arranged for season 3, but only the short version was in use by the time the show switched domestic production from Klasky Csupo to Film Roman in season 4, and that version was edited to be even shorter by the end of season 6. The alternate longer closing theme however resurfaced in a handful of post-season 4 episodes, but mostly in credit sequences that do not play music during the first half of the sequence (either with dialogue heard underneath or video footage playing under the first half of the credits).

== Awards ==
The Simpsons theme has won the National Music Award for "Favorite TV Theme" in 2002 and the BMI TV Music Award three times in 1996, 1998, and 2003. It was also nominated for the Primetime Emmy Award for Outstanding Original Main Title Theme Music in 1990.

== Alternative versions ==
In addition to the standard closing theme arrangement, certain episodes have had alternate versions of the closing theme used; some are composed in-house by Alf Clausen in alternate styles or as homages to other musical works, and some are covers by musical artists. Most of the time, these are used to tie into the plot of the episode itself. For example, several police or law-related episodes have ended with homages to the themes from Dragnet, and Hill Street Blues. Most of the Treehouse of Horror halloween episodes have opened with a horror or monster movie-styled arrangement, or with homages to themes such as The Addams Family.

The season 20 episode ”Father Knows Worst” features a live recording of the singing group Canvas performing the theme at the Washington Acapella Showcase in November 2000.

Other versions are performed by guest stars heard in an episode, such as a psychedelic rock version performed by Yo La Tengo, a chicano rock version by Los Lobos, and a post-rock version by Sigur Rós. The noise rock version by Sonic Youth, which aired at the end of the episode "Homerpalooza", has been ranked among the best versions of the theme by Matt Groening and also by Chris Turner in his book Planet Simpson. Other performers include Tito Puente, NRBQ, Fall Out Boy, The Supersonicos, and an a cappella version by Canvas. Guitarist Danny Gatton did a blues rock rendition of the theme on his 1991 album 88 Elmira St. In the Disney+ short When Billie Met Lisa, a version performed by Billie Eilish appears.

=== Green Day version ===
"The Simpsons Theme"

Single by Green Day
- Released: July 24, 2007
- Recorded: January 1, 2007
- Genre: Instrumental rock; punk rock
- Length: 1:23
- Label: Warner Bros.; Reprise
- Songwriter: Danny Elfman
- Producer: Green Day

Green Day singles chronology
"The Saints Are Coming" (2006)	"The Simpsons Theme" (2007)	"Know Your Enemy" (2009)

In 2007, Green Day recorded a cover version of the theme song for The Simpsons Movie and also released it as a single, released by Warner Bros. Records. It placed as high as number six on the Billboard Bubbling Under Hot 100 Singles, number 19 on the UK Singles Chart, and number sixteen on the UK download chart. Also for The Simpsons Movie, Hans Zimmer, who composed the score for the film, arranged his own version of the theme in an orchestral genre consistent with the original and also inserted "tiny fragments" of it into the rest of his score.

It marks the third time that Green Day has taped an instrumental track, following "Last Ride In" from Nimrod and "Espionage" from Shenanigans which was also an outtake from the Nimrod sessions. The song plays in the beginning, when they perform on the river. It also plays in the end credits.

=== Weezer version ===
In 2020, in the 21st episode of season 31 entitled "The Hateful Eight-Year-Olds", Weezer performed their own cover version of the instrumental theme, along with three other songs.
