= Otter Press =

Publishing company

- Founded: 1998
- Founder: Rik Booth, Ross Alexander
- Country of origin: Australia
- Headquarters location: Sydney, New South Wales
- Publication types: Comics
- Fiction genres: Humor, Funny animal
- Official website: http://www.otterpress.com.au

Otter Press is an Australian comic book publishing company, which releases the American Simpsons Comics series in Australia. Otter began publishing in 1998 with Simpsons Comics #32, and have published hundreds of different Simpsons books since then, spanning over ten series. They have also published various anime, movie, and other graphic novels.

== History ==
Simpsons Comics were initially published in Australia by Trielle Corporation (Trielle Komix), between 1993 and 1997. In 1998 Trielle went into liquidation at which time Rik Booth and Ross Alexander approached Bongo Comics, the American producers of Simpson Comics and secured the Australasian publishing rights to the comics. Booth had previously worked as a consultant for Marvel Comics in the Australasian market. They then established Otter Press, with their first issue of Simpsons Comics (Issue No. 32) released in 1998.

The comics were originally printed bi-monthly, but due to popular demand, earlier issues were released every month that a "new" edition was unavailable. Issues #15 to #31 were released between 1999 and 2001 in four American trade paperback editions.

The Bart Simpson comics series, for the first 15 issues, was padded out to 64 pages with a free Radioactive Man issue inside. Later editions dropped Radioactive Man, and combined two US comics into one release. In 2008, Otter Press began releasing Bart Simpson comics every two months instead of their old quarterly schedule. Recent editions now alternate between reprinting two US editions of the comic in a single issue, with the next issue containing one US edition and older stories taken from the One Shot Wonders series.

Otter Press also published titles featuring Looney Tunes characters, Scooby-Doo, and SpongeBob SquarePants. They have also issued one-shot comic book movie adaptations (including Batman Begins, X-Men: The Last Stand) as well as magazines based on popular toy lines, such as Action Man Magazine.Currently their page is shut down as well as their comics which they stopped making a couple years back. So there is no longer new issues of any of their series of comics as of 2018.

== Comics titles published ==
- Futurama Comics
- High School Musical The Official Magazine 2009-
- Jimmy Neutron Digest
- Looney Tunes Activity Special 2009-
- Looney Tunes All-Star 2008
- Looney Tunes Comic Capers! Magazine 2009-
- Looney Tunes Magazine 2008
- Scooby-Doo Magazine 2008-
- Simpsons Comics 1998-
- SpongeBob SquarePants The Official Magazine 2007-
- Shrek 2004
- Tom and Jerry Activity Special
- Walt Disney Comics Digest
- Walt Disney's Mickey Mouse Digest
- Walt Disney's Uncle Scrooge Digest
- Batman: The Brave and the Bold SuperMag 2012-

== See also ==
- Best Of The Simpsons
- Bongo Comics Group
