= Mayored to the Mob =

- The Simpsons episode
- Episode no.: Season 10; Episode 9
- Directed by: Swinton O. Scott III
- Written by: Ron Hauge
- Production code: AABF05
- Original air date: December 20, 1998

Guest appearances
- Mark Hamill as himself and Leavelle; Joe Mantegna as Fat Tony; Dick Tufeld as Lost in Space Robot

Episode features
- Chalkboard gag: "'The President did it' is not an excuse".
- Couch gag: The Simpsons sit on the couch. Two hydraulic presses from the sides and one from above crushes the family into a cube.
- Commentary: Matt Groening; Mike Scully; George Meyer; Ron Hauge; Dan Castellaneta; Mark Hamill

Episode chronology
← Previous "Homer Simpson in: 'Kidney Trouble'"	Next → "Viva Ned Flanders"
- The Simpsons season 10

"Mayored to the Mob" is the ninth episode of the tenth season of the American animated television series The Simpsons. It originally aired on Fox in the United States on December 20, 1998. After Homer prevents Mayor Quimby and Mark Hamill from being trampled at a convention, Homer trains to become a bodyguard and is employed by Quimby. After Homer discovers Quimby has been making corrupt deals with Fat Tony and forces him to end the deal, Fat Tony threatens to kill Quimby, leaving Homer to defend the Mayor from threats. The episode was written by Ron Hauge and directed by Swinton O. Scott III, and received positive reviews from critics overall.

== Plot ==
While watching television, the Simpson family sees a commercial for the "Bi-Mon-Sci-Fi-Con", a science-fiction convention featuring Mark Hamill and others, and decide to attend. A riot breaks out at the convention after Hamill offers the chance for someone in the crowd to act out a scene with him. Homer notices that Hamill and Mayor Quimby are in danger of being trampled due to the riot and quickly rescues them. In gratitude, Quimby employs Homer as his bodyguard, whilst firing his current security detail for cloud watching instead of rescuing him.

Homer begins training at "Leavelle's Bodyguard Academy," where he quickly graduates and begins his new job. Homer and the Mayor get along well at first, and Homer cluelessly enjoys all of the corruption that Quimby embraces (including free beers and hamburgers). But unbeknownst to Homer, Quimby made a deal with Fat Tony shortly after Homer was employed to provide milk to the schools of Springfield. Homer discovers the milk is from rats and stops his kids (but not Milhouse) from drinking the gross rodent milk at school. Homer then confronts Quimby, accidentally knocking him out a window. As Quimby hangs from a ledge, Homer makes him promise to expose Fat Tony in return for being pulled to safety, which he agrees to.

Quimby organizes the arrests of Fat Tony and his men, and Fat Tony openly threatens Quimby's life. Scared at having to defend Quimby due to the death threats, Homer attempts to reassure the Mayor by taking him to a dinner theater to see Hamill portray Nathan Detroit in Guys and Dolls. However, Homer finds Fat Tony there alongside his henchman, Louie, and unwittingly makes the situation worse when he follows Fat Tony's suggestion to plant a kiss on Mayor Quimby. Louie then attempts to stab Quimby, but is stopped by Homer after Hamill advises Homer to "use the forks." However, Fat Tony is still able to savagely beat Quimby with a baseball bat while Homer is distracted. After the show, Hamill comforts Homer and tells him that Quimby will be fine, and Homer helps Hamill escape from the paparazzi.

== Production ==
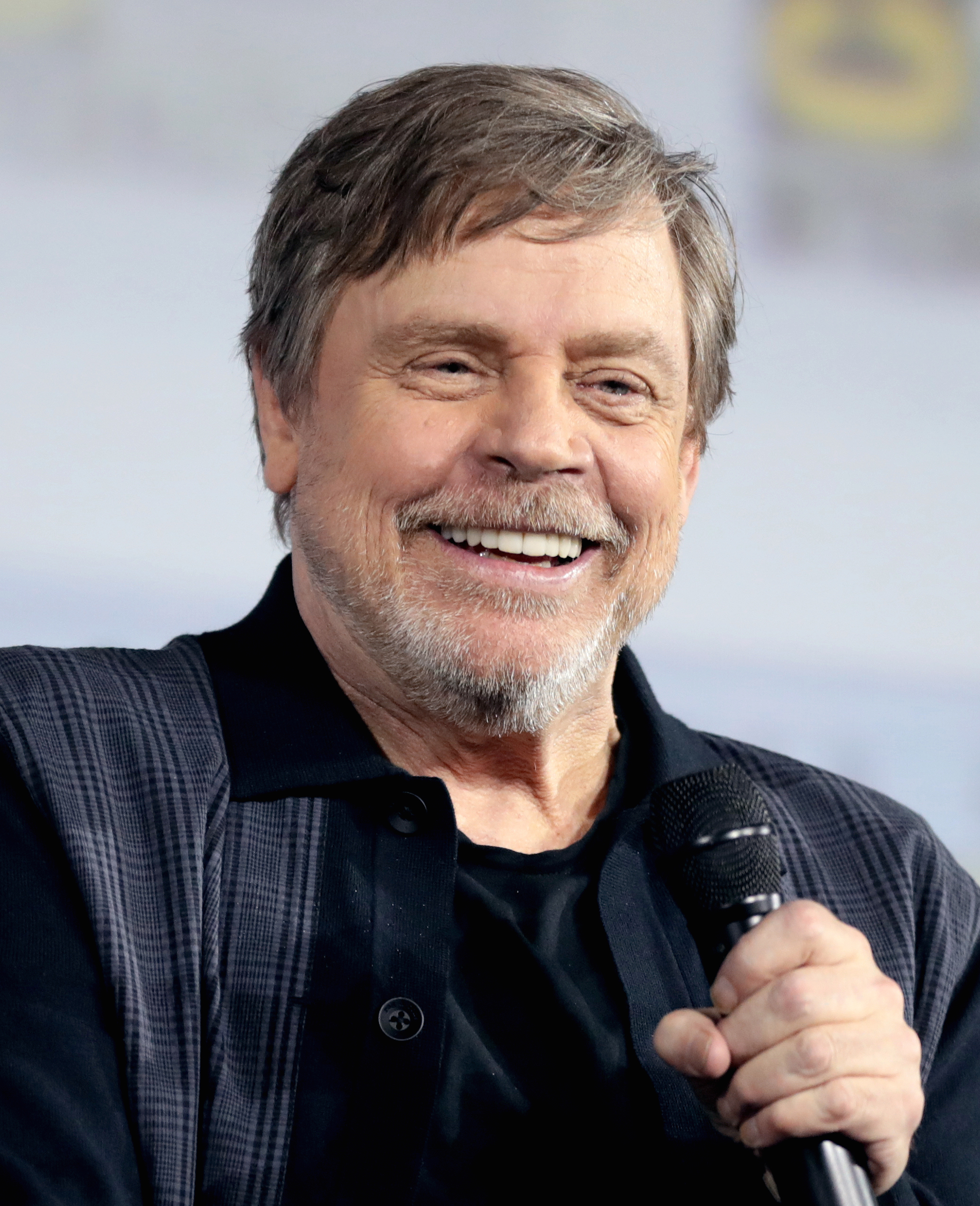
Mark Hamill (pictured) guest starred as himself and instructor Leavelle.

Ron Hauge, writer of the episode, wanted to do an episode where he would use Homer's qualities such as oafishness, brute strength, thickness and loyalty, for good. When Lisa says they have to go back for Maggie after the family escape the riot, Homer says "Forget Maggie, she's gone". The Simpsons creator Matt Groening claims this to be one of his favorite quotes in the show. Mark Hamill only agreed to guest star if he was allowed to voice a character as well as himself. He stated that he loved doing the voice for bodyguard instructor Leavelle a lot more than he did providing the voice for himself.

== Cultural references ==
The Bi-Mon-Sci-Fi-Con science-fiction convention features numerous references to the genre. As well as Hamill, guests at the convention include ALF from the television series ALF, Tom Baker in costume as the Fourth Doctor from the series Doctor Who, Gort from the 1951 film The Day the Earth Stood Still, Godzilla from the film series of the same name and Jonathan Harris in costume as Dr. Zachary Smith from the 1960s television series Lost in Space, as well as the robot from the show. Real-life astronaut Neil Armstrong is also a guest.

Among the attendees is Üter, who wears a Futurama shirt; Futurama, an animated science-fiction comedy which was created by The Simpsons' creator Matt Groening, did not premiere until the following year. Seymour Skinner is dressed as Spock from Star Trek, as are several others, and Edna Krabappel is dressed as Barbarella from the comic and film Barbarella (1968). Other costumes include Xena from the series Xena: Warrior Princess, Terminator from The Terminator film series, Griffin from the novel The Invisible Man (1897) and later the comic book series The League of Extraordinary Gentlemen, as well as a Borg and Geordi La Forge from Star Trek. When Comic Book Guy meets a girl with similar interests to him at the convention, Alexander Courage's piece "Under the Spell" from the original Star Trek pilot "The Cage" plays. A booth for the comic book Roswell, Little Green Man is seen at the convention; the comic was published by Groening's Bongo Comics Group.

The episode contains multiple references to Star Wars, the film series in which Hamill starred. Throughout the episode, Hamill wears the costume of his Star Wars character Luke Skywalker, and tells Homer to "use the forks," spoofing the line "use the Force" from the franchise. The convention features a tag-team wrestling match which sees "the mighty robots" (the Cylons) from the series Battlestar Galactica fight the "gay robots" (R2-D2 and C-3PO) from Star Wars. Somebody at the convention wears a costume of the Star Wars character Chewbacca. Homer and Mayor Quimby attend a production of the musical Guys and Dolls (1955), starring Hamill as Nathan Detroit, who sings the Star Wars-themed "Luke, Be a Jedi Tonight" to the tune of "Luck Be a Lady".

Leavelle's design is based on Texan detective Jim Leavelle, as he appeared when escorting Lee Harvey Oswald when Oswald was shot by Jack Ruby. Leavelle trains the bodyguards by pretending to shoot their protectee from a grassy knoll on a cart. This is a reference to the grassy knoll at the site of President John F. Kennedy’s assassination, Dealey Plaza and a scene from the Kennedy assassination film Executive Action (1973).

The plot shares elements with the film The Bodyguard (1992), particularly Homer carrying Hamill away from the crowd at the end. Leavelle sings the song "I Will Always Love You" by Dolly Parton, which was popularized by Whitney Houston as the theme for The Bodyguard; it also plays at the end. After believing he has killed Mayor Quimby, Homer decides to take inspiration from the film Weekend at Bernie's (1989) and "use the body to stage an elaborate farce." The title of the episode is a reference to the film Married to the Mob (1988). During the Guys and Dolls scene the cast members sing a song with the musical's title to the tune of "Hooray for Hollywood", which as Hamill points out isn't one of the show's musical numbers.

== Reception ==
In its original broadcast, "Mayored to the Mob" finished 24th in ratings for the week of December 14–20, 1998, with a Nielsen rating of 8.6, equivalent to approximately 8.5 million viewing households. It was the second highest-rated show on the Fox network that week, following Ally McBeal.

Empire named Hamill's performance in the episode as the tenth-best film gag in the show, commenting: "As a rule, celebrity cameos are rubbish, but good sport Hamill is hilarious when singing 'Luke, be a Jedi tonight' in a production of Guys and Dolls, and makes this list for urging bodyguard Homer to 'use the forks.'" Eric Goldman, Dan Iverson and Brian Zoromski of IGN marked Hamill's guest appearance second on a list of "Top 25 Simpsons Guest appearances" saying that much of the episode's humor came from Hamill being "a good sport about his past". In addition, Hamill ranked 18th on AOL's list of their favorite 25 Simpsons guest stars, and Total Film's Nathan Ditum ranked his performance as the third-best guest appearance in the show's history. Simon Crerar of The Times also listed Hamill's performance as one of the thirty-three funniest cameos in the history of The Simpsons.

The authors of the book I Can't Believe It's a Bigger and Better Updated Unofficial Simpsons Guide, Warren Martyn and Adrian Wood, wrote that "the best bits all involve either the convention or Mark Hamill's repeated attempts to not be mobbed. Sadly, the main thrust of the story – Homer's protection of Quimby from Don Tony – falls a bit flat. Nevertheless, when the jokes run free, they are of exceptionally high quality." In his review of The Simpsons' tenth season, James Plath of DVD Town notes "Mayored to the Mob" to be "one of the funnier episodes." IGN named it as the best episode of season 10. In an interview with Australian newspaper mX, season 10 show runner Mike Scully marked "Mayored to the Mob" as fourth in his top-five episodes from season 10. Screen Rant called it the best episode of the 10th season.
