= Ian Boothby =

Canadian writer and comedian (born 1967)

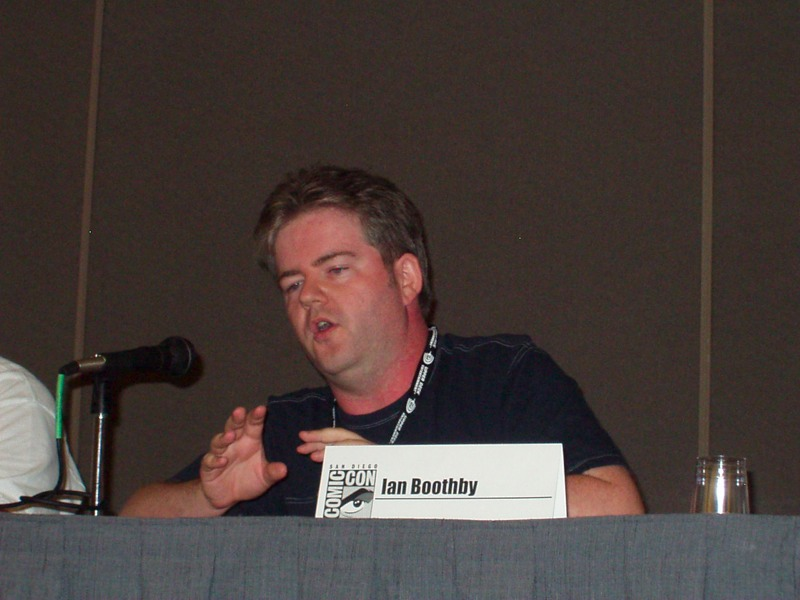
- Born: June 8, 1967 (age 59)
- Occupation: writer/comedian
- Spouse: Pia Guerra

Ian Boothby (born June 8, 1967) is a multiple-Shuster Award, and Harvey Award nominee and Eisner Award–winning comic book creator best known for his work as the lead writer on Simpsons Comics and Futurama Comics for Matt Groening's Bongo Comics.

== Career ==
Boothby is a regular writer for MAD Magazine. He has also worked on various Canadian television series and is a well-known stand-up, sketch and improv comedian working in the Vancouver area. He co-created Free Willie Shakespeare for the Vancouver Theatresports League which won the Jessie Richardson Theatre Award for Excellence in Interactive Theatre.

He is a writer for multiple television series including CBC's Switchback, Street Cents, "Big Sound" and Popular Mechanics for Kids. He is the co-writer of the DVD film Casper's Haunted Christmas.

Boothy is the creator of the sketch comedy series The 11th Hour, called "The funniest sketch series since SCTV" by the National Post, as well as the creator of the TV pilots Space Arm, Vancouver PM and I Dig BC and the co-creator of Channel 92 along with Dean Haglund and Christine Lippa. Boothby founded the Canadian Comedy Award-winning sketch group Canadian Content. He currently performs with the sketch comedy group Titmouse! and "The Critical Hit Show: a Live Dungeons & Dragons Comedy Experience," writes for CBC Radio's The Irrelevant Show, and co-hosts the podcasts Sneaky Dragon, Compleatly Beatles, Totally Tintin, The Fansplainers and Full Marx - a Marx Brothers Podcast with David Dedrick. He has also written the ebook It's About Tolerance Stupid : essays on improv & how to make things better without making yourself crazy. He is the writer of Sparks! a graphic novel series for the Scholastic Corporation's Graphix line with art by Nina Matsumoto, and Exorsisters, an ongoing series from Image Comics with art by Gisele Lagace.

He appeared in the Adam Sandler film Happy Gilmore.

== Personal life ==
Ian Boothby is married to Y The Last Man co-creator and artist Pia Guerra, and regularly contributes cartoons with her in The New Yorker, The Washington Post, Mad Magazine , GoComics daily strip Mannequin on the Moon and the Scholastic graphic novel Frostbite.

== See also ==
- List of Eisner Award winners
