= Treehouse of Horror X =

- The Simpsons episode
- Episode no.: Season 11; Episode 4
- Directed by: Pete Michels
- Written by: "I Know What You Diddily-Iddily-Did": Donick Cary; "Desperately Xeeking Xena": Tim Long; "Life's a Glitch, Then You Die": Ron Hauge
- Production code: BABF01
- Original air date: October 31, 1999

Guest appearances
- Tom Arnold as himself; Dick Clark as himself; Lucy Lawless as herself; Frank Welker as Werewolf Ned Flanders

Episode features
- Couch gag: Each member of the family dresses up as something from a previous "Treehouse of Horror" special, save for Lisa, who is an axe victim.
- Commentary: Mike Scully; George Meyer; Ian Maxtone-Graham; Ron Hauge; Donick Cary; Tim Long; Matt Selman; Pete Michels

Episode chronology
← Previous "Guess Who's Coming to Criticize Dinner?"	Next → "E-I-E-I-(Annoyed Grunt)"
- The Simpsons season 11

"Treehouse of Horror X" is the fourth episode of the eleventh season of the American animated television series The Simpsons, and the tenth annual Treehouse of Horror episode, consisting of three self-contained segments. It first aired on the Fox network in the United States on Halloween, 1999. In "I Know What You Diddily-Iddily-Did", the Simpsons cover up a murder and are haunted by an unseen witness. In "Desperately Xeeking Xena", Lisa and Bart gain superpowers and must rescue Xena star Lucy Lawless from the Comic Book Guy's alter ego The Collector, and in "Life's a Glitch, Then You Die", Homer causes worldwide destruction thanks to the Y2K bug.

"Treehouse of Horror X" was directed by Pete Michels and written by Ron Hauge, Donick Cary and Tim Long. The episode contains numerous parodies and references to horror and science fiction works, including Doctor Who, I Know What You Did Last Summer and Battlestar Galactica. It also features actress Lucy Lawless and actors Tom Arnold, and Dick Clark as themselves. In its original broadcast, the episode was seen by approximately 8.7 million viewers, finishing in 34th place in the ratings the week it aired. Since its airing, the episode received positive reviews from critics. A spin-off comic book series based on the segment "Desperately Xeeking Xena", entitled Simpsons Super Spectacular, has been published by Bongo Comics since 2005.

== Plot ==
=== "I Know What You Diddily-Iddily-Did" ===
The Simpsons are driving through a fog when Marge accidentally runs over Ned Flanders, killing him. The next day, Homer stages Ned's death. Soon after Ned's funeral, during which Homer almost unwittingly confesses to Ned's murder, the family finds the words "I Know What You Did" written on their house and car. They are terrorized by a cloaked, hook-wielding figure, and flee. When their car breaks down, they discover that Ned is the cloaked figure. He was not killed because he was bitten by a werewolf just before the accident. The full moon appears and Ned turns into a werewolf. Marge, Bart, Maggie and Lisa run away but Homer is caught, and taunts the werewolf while he is mauled to death.

=== "Desperately Xeeking Xena" ===
A malfunctioning X-ray machine gives Bart the ability to stretch any part of his body and Lisa super strength. They become a superhero duo, calling themselves "Stretch Dude and Clobber Girl". Lucy Lawless addresses fans at a science fiction convention. Comic Book Guy, now a villain called "The Collector", kidnaps her and takes her to his lair with the intention of marrying her. Stretch Dude and Clobber Girl arrive to rescue Lawless, but are also captured. The Collector prepares to kill them by submerging them in a vat of molten Lucite. Lawless pretends to be attracted to the Collector and then clobbers him. The Collector grabs his limited edition double edged lightsaber from Star Wars: Episode I – The Phantom Menace and ignites the blades, but when Lawless points out that he has removed it from its original packaging, he panics and falls into the Lucite. Lawless flies the children home.

=== "Life's a Glitch, Then You Die" ===
On December 31, 1999, Homer, the Springfield Nuclear Power Plant's Y2K compliance officer, has neglected to fix all possible problems in the plant's computers. This results in a computer virus causing widespread destruction and societal collapse. The family learns from Krusty whose pacemaker has gone haywire that a rocket is being prepared for humanity's "best and brightest", and will carry them to Mars to preserve human civilization. Homer fails to bluff his way on board but the guard recognizes Lisa as the ship's designated proofreader. Lisa is only able to take one parent with her, and immediately chooses Marge (and Maggie as she was carrying her). Homer and Bart find a second, unguarded rocket. They quickly notice that it is filled with second-rate celebrities and headed directly for the sun. Homer and Bart cannot bear being with these passengers and eject themselves into space.

== Production ==
"Treehouse of Horror X" was directed by Pete Michels and written by Donick Cary, Tim Long and Ron Hauge. It originally aired on the Fox network in the United States on Halloween, 1999. "I Know What You Diddily-Iddily-Did" was conceived and written by former staff writer Cary. In the DVD commentary for the episode, Cary said that he came up with the segment after watching the 1997 horror film I Know What You Did Last Summer. "I had just seen the movie and I was like, 'Hey, there you go.'" he said. While Flanders serves as the segment's antagonist, the role was originally written for Grampa, who would chase Homer inside a roller disco. While Grampa does not appear in the segment, the Springfield Roller Disco is seen during the Simpsons escape from Flanders. Despite serving as writer for the segment, Cary left the series after finishing the first draft in order to work on an animated Austin Powers series, which never came to fruition. In his absence, the writing staff rewrote the last quarter of the segment and added the revelation that Flanders is a werewolf. In order to dispose of Ned Flanders' corpse, Homer throws his body into Flanders' house. After he is finished, he says "That's the end of that chapter", a phrase used as a catchphrase in the season 10 episode "Homer to the Max" and one that Cary often uses in his everyday life. "That's just something that comes up a lot in my life is when no matter if it's a good or a bad thing, just move on" he said.

Guest actors in "Treehouse of Horror X"

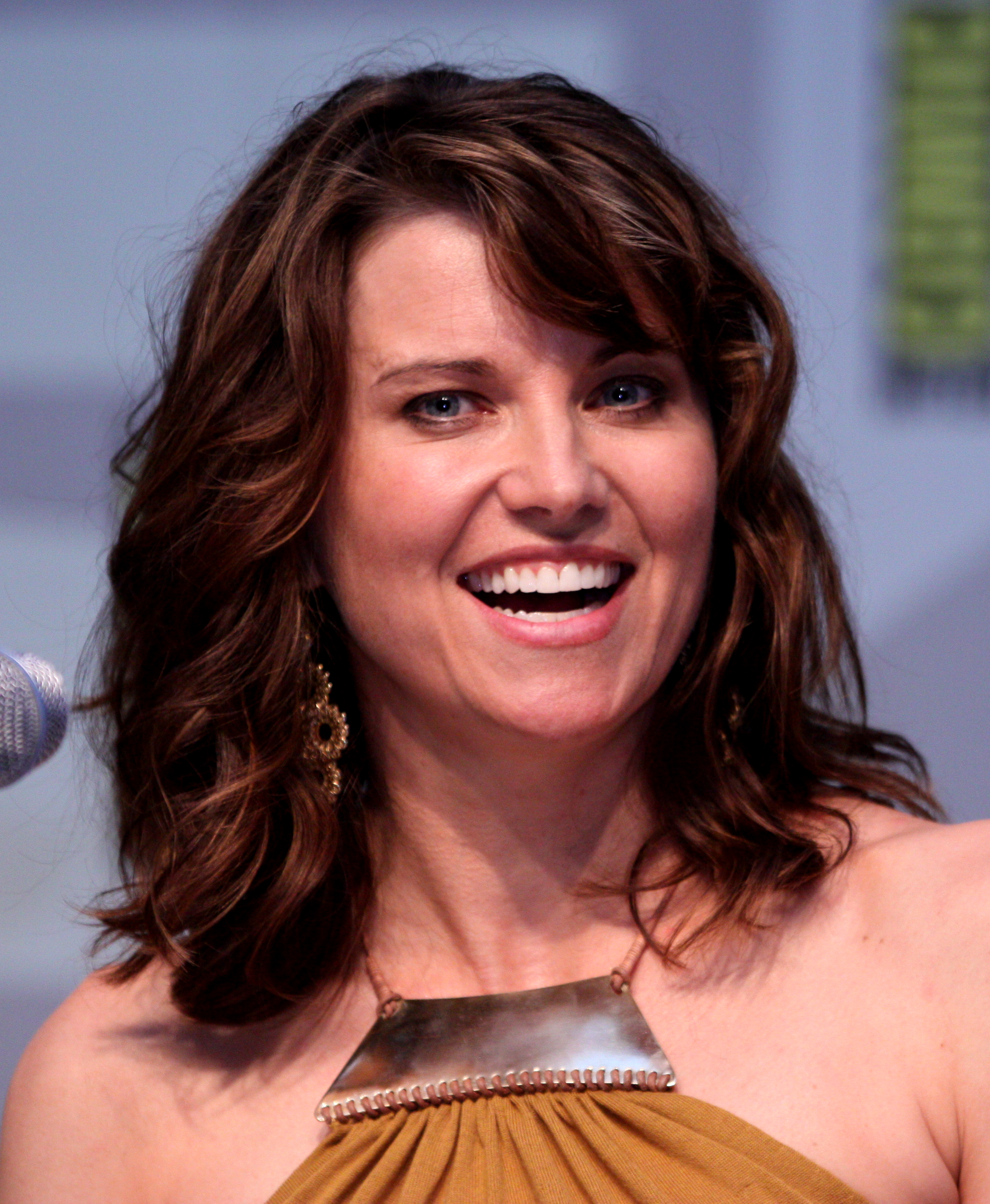
Lucy Lawless

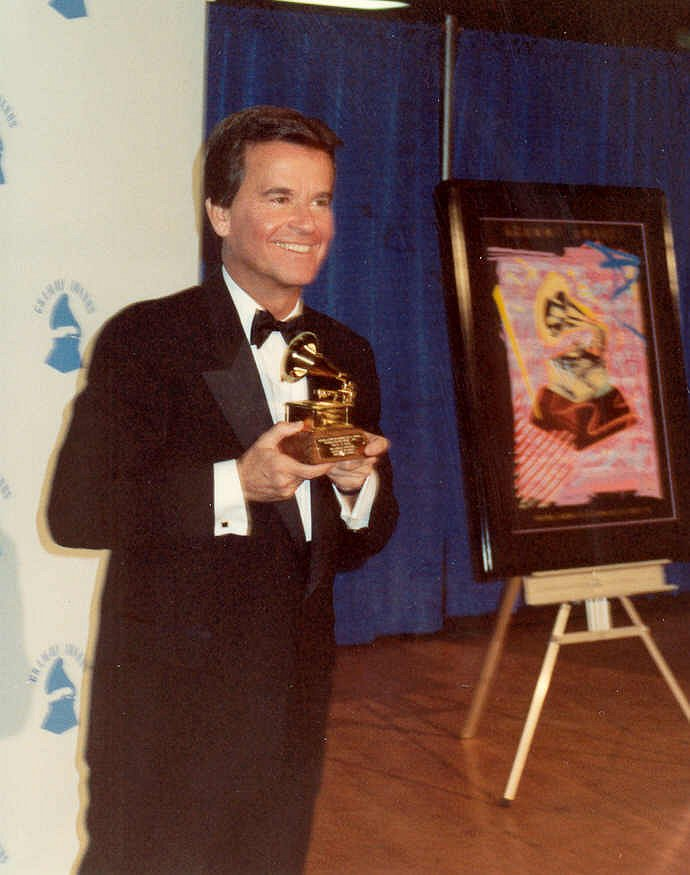
Dick Clark

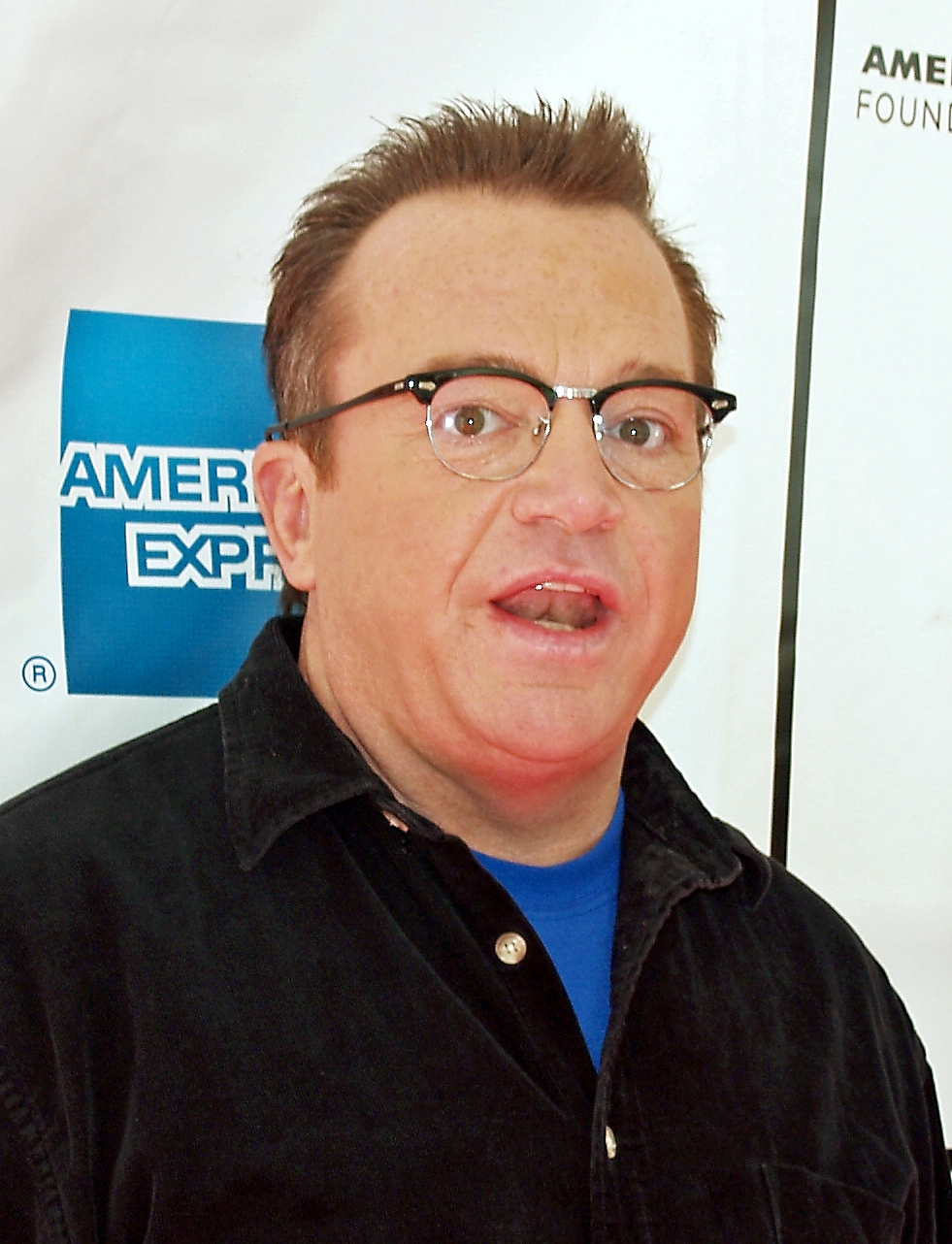
Tom Arnold

"Desperately Xeeking Xena" was written by staff writer Long. At the beginning of the segment, Milhouse is seen wearing a plastic smock with a picture of Radioactive Man on it. The scene was based on an experience in Long's childhood; "I asked my mom for a Batman costume. And I got a smock that had Batman on it and said 'Batman'. It was very dispiriting" he said in the episode's DVD commentary. "Stretch Dude & Clobber Girl"'s theme song was written by Long and composed by Alf Clausen. During the sequence, Stretch Dude and Clobber Girl are seen assaulting Saddam Hussein, the fifth President of Iraq and being thanked for their help by President Bill Clinton afterwards. According to Long, the writing staff had a "passionate" discussion about whether the duo would be attacking Hussein or Iranian religious leader and politician Ruhollah Khomeini during the sequence. Scully quipped that Hussein was chosen because "he was always asking to be on the show." The segment features New Zealand actress Lucy Lawless as herself. According to Long, Lawless was very happy with the segment's script. She was especially fond of the speech she gives to The Collector, in which she mentions that she was very tall as an adolescent. Lawless was directed by Scully, who commented that she was "terrific". In an interview with the Hungarian online newspaper Origo, Lawless said that her part in the episode was the best experience she had guest-starring for a show. "It was really funny when the Comic Book Guy kidnapped me", she said.

"Life's a Glitch, Then You Die" was written and conceived by Hauge. In DVD commentary for the episode, Hauge stated that, when writing the segment, he knew it would not age well. "I was aware of it at the time, that it wouldn't last forever" he said, "But I wanted to capture that moment." According to director Michels, the rocket which transported the "best and brightest" of the population was drawn to resemble an ice pop. The Simpsons' staff had a lot of trouble finding a guest star for the second rocket, and the only person who agreed to participate was American actor Tom Arnold. In the episode, Arnold is depicted as an annoying, "not-so-great" celebrity. Although he was mostly in on the joke, Arnold did "bust [the staff's] chops" a little bit when recording his lines. "He would say a line and then they'd yell cut and he'd look over at me and take a shot at me" Hauge said. Still, Hauge found Arnold's performance "fantastic" and Scully said that he was a "good sport". The segment also features television personality Dick Clark as himself. A few months after the episode aired, Hauge discussed the segment with Clark in a Fox studio. According to Hauge, Clark said that the episode gave the "biggest response" he had ever gotten from anything he had ever done. "After the career that he had in television for so long, just to give him a highlight was a highlight for me" Hauge said in the episode's DVD commentary. In retrospective, George Meyer disagreed with the inclusions of Spike Lee and Al Sharpton in the second rocket, admitting in the DVD commentary he would have preferred to put New York Yankees owner George Steinbrenner in their place.

== Cultural references ==
The opening segment, which shows Kang and Kodos attempting to entertain an audience of aliens, was "born out of [The Simpsons' staff's] love" of comedy teams like Martin and Lewis and the Smothers Brothers. The plot of "I Know What You Diddily-Iddily-Did" is based on the 1997 horror film I Know What You Did Last Summer. At the beginning of the segment, the Simpsons are seen escaping from a group of vampires. Holding a package of Super Sugar Crisp cereal, Homer starts singing a jingle about the cereal. Super Sugar Crisp is a reference to the breakfast cereal Golden Crisp, while the jingle Homer sings references "Can't get enough of that Golden Crisp", a jingle sung by Golden Crisp's mascot Sugar Bear during advertisements for the cereal. According to Scully, the series' staff had a lot of trouble clearing the song for the episode. "Apparently, they didn't want the tune [...] used in this context" he said in the episode's DVD commentary.

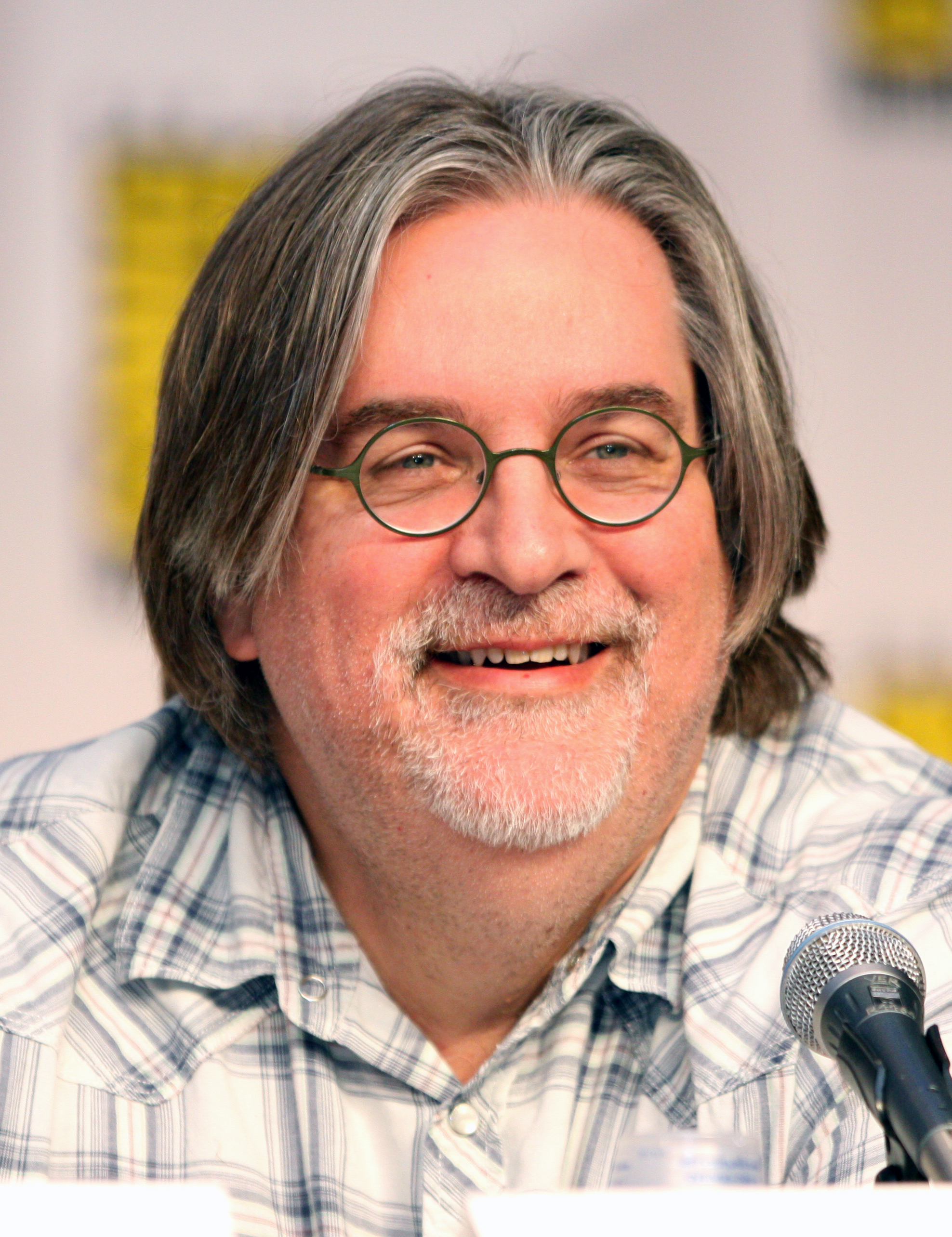
Matt Groening, creator of The Simpsons, is seen kidnapped by The Collector

Although there is a Marvel Comics character called Collector, Long did not base The Collector on him. While carrying Lawless with an electromagnet, The Collector says "Care for a Rolo, sweet Xena?" The reference was included because the writing staff were given free Rolos at the time. In The Collector's lair, several celebrities are seen stored in aluminized PET film bags. Some of these include The Simpsons' creator Matt Groening and Tom Baker, who portrayed the fourth incarnation of The Doctor in the British science fiction television series Doctor Who. "There are several Doctor Who actors but Tom Baker is the one we always go with" Hauge explained in the episode's DVD commentary. Other captives include actress Yasmine Bleeth, Gilligan from the series Gilligan's Island and Spock and Seven of Nine from Star Trek. The segment also features the series' first reference to Star Wars: Episode I – The Phantom Menace, when The Collector uses a mint-condition Darth Maul double-bladed lightsaber. Because the episode was written before the film's release, the writers did not know "how bad it was gonna be", in their view, and therefore did not include any "obligatory shot" at the film. As he dies, The Collector poses as Lorne Greene's character Commander Adama in the science fiction series Battlestar Galactica.

Hauge based "Life's a Glitch, Then You Die" on the hysteria involving Y2K, a digital problem that occurred the night into January 1, 2000. Humans escaping an unsavable Earth in rockets is a reference to the 1951 film When Worlds Collide. In a scene in the segment, several celebrities, including actor Mel Gibson and former Major League Baseball player Mark McGwire, can be seen waiting in line for the first rocket. They both guest starred as themselves in two earlier episodes from the season, "Beyond Blunderdome" and "Brother's Little Helper". Others in the line include businessman Bill Gates, director Ron Howard, former President Jimmy Carter, scientist Stephen Hawking, rock musician Paul McCartney, basketball player Michael Jordan and ice skater Michelle Kwan. Those on the doomed ship include actors Pauly Shore and Tom Arnold, politicians Ross Perot and Dan Quayle, singer Courtney Love, TV presenters Rosie O'Donnell and Laura Schlessinger, film director Spike Lee, activist Al Sharpton and figure skater Tonya Harding.

== Release and reception ==
In its original American broadcast on October 31, 1999, "Treehouse of Horror X" received an 8.6 rating, according to Nielsen Media Research, translating to approximately 8.7 million viewers. The episode finished in 34th place in the ratings for the week of October 25-31, 1999. Following the episode was a rerun of "Treehouse of Horror IX", which was originally broadcast the previous year. In 2000, "Treehouse of Horror X" was nominated for a CINE Golden Eagle Award, which it ultimately won. It was also nominated for a Golden Reel Award in the category of "Best Sound Editing - Television Animation", which it lost to the SpongeBob SquarePants episode "Mermaid Man & Barnacle Boy". On October 7, 2008, "Treehouse of Horror X" was released as part of The Simpsons: The Complete Eleventh Season DVD set. Mike Scully, George Meyer, Ian Maxtone-Graham, Ron Hauge, Donick Cary, Tim Long, Matt Selman and Pete Michels participated in the audio commentary of the episode.

Following its broadcast, "Treehouse of Horror X" received positive reviews from critics. In his review of The Simpsons: The Complete Eleventh Season, Colin Jacobson of DVD Movie Guide wrote "Even in the series’ crummier seasons, the staff always seems to come up with a good Halloween episode", and that "Treehouse of Horror X" "continues that trend". Of the three segments, Jacobson found "Life's a Glitch, Then You Die" to be the weakest. He wrote "[...] other than a good ending, it simply doesn’t have a lot going for it" and added that it is the most dated of the three. He continued, "'Diddily' offers a fun horror spoof, and 'Xena' is a terrific superhero bit with plenty of cleverness." DVD Talk's Ian Jane gave the episode a positive review as well. Considering it to be one of the season's best episodes, Jane wrote "This one, like so many that have come before and since, is a great blend of horror movie parody and Halloween themed fun in Springfield." In 2007, Seb Patrick of Noise to Signal included "Desperately Xeeking Xena" in a list called "The Ten Best Treehouse of Horror Vignettes". Although he disliked Bart and Lisa's part in the segment, Patrick wrote that it "earns its stripes by being perhaps Comic Book Guy's finest hour". He also praised the segment's references, as well as Lawless' line "A wizard did it", a phrase used to explain continuity errors. In 2009, The Collector's marriage proposal to Lawless was included in "Line-O-Rama: Comic Book Guy", a compilation of what IGN considers to be The Comic Book Guy's best lines.

== Comic book series ==
A spin-off comic book series based on the segment "Desperately Xeeking Xena", entitled Simpsons Super Spectacular, has been published by Bongo Comics since 2005, following the continued adventures of Stretch Dude and Clobber Girl (with the addition of Bouncing Battle Baby).
