= List of The Simpsons comics =

The following is a list of comic book series published by Bongo Comics based on the American animated television series The Simpsons. The first comic strips based on The Simpsons appeared in 1991 in the magazine Simpsons Illustrated (not to be confused with the comic publications from 2012 bearing the same name), which was a companion magazine to the show. The comic strips were popular and a one-shot comic book entitled Simpsons Comics and Stories, containing three different stories, was released in 1993 for the fans. The book was a success and due to this, the creator of The Simpsons, Matt Groening, and his companions Bill Morrison, Steve Vance and Cindy Vance created the publishing company Bongo Comics. By the end of 1993, Bongo was publishing four titles: Simpsons Comics, Bartman, Radioactive Man and Itchy & Scratchy Comics. Since then, many more titles have been published, out of which Simpsons Comics, Bart Simpson, Bart Simpson's Treehouse of Horror, Simpsons Super Spectacular, Simpsons Summer Shindig, and Simpsons Winter Wingding.

Simpsons Comics and Bart Simpson comics are reprinted in the United Kingdom by the publishing company Titan Magazines, under the same titles. Various stories from other Bongo publications released in the United States, are also reprinted in the UK Simpsons Comics. The same titles are published in Australia by Otter Press. Issues of Simpsons Comics, Bart Simpson's Treehouse of Horror and Bart Simpson have been collected and reprinted in trade paperbacks in the United States by HarperCollins.

== Full list of publications ==
Title	First issue	Last issue
Simpsons Comics and Stories (One Shot Issue)	January 1993	January 1993
The Official History of Bongo Comics (One Shot Issue)	1993	1993
Simpsons Comics	November 1993	October 2018
Bartman	December 1993	July 1995
Itchy & Scratchy Comics	December 1993	November 1994
Radioactive Man	January 1994	2004
Bartman and Radioactive Man	1994	1994
Krusty Comics (Three-issue mini series)	January 1995	March 1995
Lisa Comics (One Shot Issue)	April 1995	April 1995
The Simpson's Treehouse of Horror	September 1995	September 2017
Bart Simpson	2000	February 2016
Simpsons Summer Special (One Shot Issue)	December 2001	December 2001
The Simpsons Futurama Crossover Crisis	August 2002	March 2005
Simpsons Super Spectacular	June 2006	October 2013
The Simpsons Winter Wingding	November 2006	November 2015
The Simpsons Summer Shindig	June 2007	June 2015
Simpsons Treasure Trove	July 2007	ongoing
Comic Book Guy: The Comic Book (Five-issue mini series)	July 2010	November 2010
Simpsons Illustrated (2012)	January 2012	2017
One-Shot Wonders	February 2012	2018

== Ongoing series ==
=== The Simpsons' Treehouse of Horror ===
The Simpsons' Treehouse of Horror (formally named Bart Simpson's Treehouse of Horror until 2008) #13.

The Simpsons' Treehouse of Horror was an annual horror series. It was published around September–October, for Halloween, every year from 1995 to 2017. It takes its name from the annual Treehouse of Horror episodes of the television series. Like the episodes, the comic book always feature three stories in each issue. The stories are written and illustrated by some of the most famous people in the comic book business. The series had stories created by such industry professionals as Garth Ennis (Preacher), Dan Decarlo (Archie Comics), Evan Dorkin (Milk and Cheese), Marv Wolfman and Gene Colan (Blade, Archie Comics, Tomb of Dracula) and musicians Gene Simmons (Kiss), Alice Cooper and Rob Zombie as well as Pat Boone. The stories usually parody modern horror stories and films, and feature distorted versions of the people of Springfield.

=== Simpsons Comics One-Shot Wonders ===
Simpsons Comics One-Shot Wonders was a series of single-issue comic books. Eighteen titles have been published from 2012 to 2018: Ralph Wiggum Comics (February 2012), Bart Simpson's Pal, Milhouse (April 2012), Li'l Homer Comics (August 2012), Maggie (October 2012), Professor Frink's Fantastic Science Fictions (February 2013), The Malevolent Mr. Burns (June 2013), Two One-Shot Wonders in One (July 2013), The Wonderful World of Lisa Simpson (December 2013), Duffman Adventures (April 2014), Kang & Kodos (August 2014), McBain (December 2014), Jimbo Jones (September 2015), Grampa Simpson's Adventure (December 2015), Krusty the Clown (April 2017), The Mighty Moe Szyslak (June 2017), Bartman Spectacularly Super Secret Saga #1 (August 2017), Bartman Spectacularly Super Secret Saga #2 (October 2017), Bartman Spectacularly Super Secret Saga #3 (December 2017), and Chief Wiggum's Felonious Funnies (March 2018).

== Discontinued series, limited series and one-shots ==
=== Simpsons Comics and Stories ===
Cover of the only issue of Simpsons Comics and Stories.

Simpsons Comics and Stories was a one-shot comic book edition of the magazine Simpsons Illustrated. Due to the success of this comic book, the Bongo Comics group was created. The comic book was then replaced by Simpsons Comics.

=== Simpsons Comics ===
Simpsons Comics was a monthly series based on the animated TV show The Simpsons. The first issue was published on November 29, 1993. Since then over two hundred issues have been released, with the 100th issue mainly the comic book equivalent of a clip show. It was originally published every two months, but went monthly in the fall of 2000.

Since March 1997, the comic has also had a monthly United Kingdom edition. This mainly reprints the stories from the U.S. edition, along with pages featuring UK readers' drawings (currently Springfield Multiplex for movie parodies and Android's Dungeon for video game and comic book parodies) and Junk Mail, a letters page which also features generic drawings, along with the readers' frequent attempts to guess the identity of 'Junk Mail Guy', the incredibly sarcastic man who answers the letters and has apparently been locked up in a basement. The U.S. and Australian editions used to have Junk Mail, but it disappeared beginning with #114. But returned some time later.

On March 20, 2013, Bongo Comics released the "200th issue" of the "Simpsons Comic," with the issue having an extra special supersized story.

Since the release of the first Simpsons Comics issue in the United States in 1993, the comic book series has been published at some point in the following countries around the world: Australia, Brazil, the Czech Republic, Estonia, Finland, France, Germany, Hungary, Italy, Lithuania, Mexico, the Netherlands, Norway, Portugal, Russia, Serbia, Spain, Sweden, Turkey, and the United Kingdom.

It was announced on July 27, 2018 that Simpsons Comics would cease after the release of #245, as Bongo Comics was planning to shut down. The final issue was published on October 17, 2018.

On November 24, 1993, there was a signing at Golden Apple Comics in Los Angeles, where members of the Bongo Comics group (Steve Vance, Cindy Vance, Bill Morrison, & Matt Groening) autographed 500 copies of Simpsons Comics #1 and gave out a special Certificate of Authenticity (COA) with them. Each COA was individually numbered and had a raised seal stamped onto it.

=== Bart Simpson ===
Bart Simpson comics were first published in the United States in late 2000, and have remained on a bi-monthly schedule until mid-2011. The comic book series is centered on the Simpsons star Bart Simpson, but it also features the children of Springfield and each issue commonly has several short stories.

The Australian edition of Bart Simpson comics was first printed in 2002 by Otter Press, in a digest-sized edition with a bonus Radioactive Man comic book, and has been released since then on a quarterly schedule (every three months). They are also reprinted in the United Kingdom by Titan Magazines.

The series was discontinued in February 2016 at the one-hundredth issue, which was a 48-page special.

=== The Official History of Bongo Comics ===
The Official History of Bongo Comics was a one-shot limited edition comic book of only 750 copies which were given out to a few patrons at San Diego Comic-Con in 1993 as part of the launch of Bongo Comics. The single issue was only ten pages long.

=== Bartman ===
Bartman was a short-lived series that told the tale of Bart Simpson's superhero alter-ego, Bartman, who first appeared in the season 2 episode "Three Men and a Comic Book". It was one of the four 'premiere' series released by Bongo Comics in late 1993. The Bartman series lasted only six issues, and was canceled in 1995. Many smaller Bartman stories have since been published in Simpsons Comics and Bart Simpson comics.

The main writers and artists for the first three issues were Steve Vance and Bill Morrison, who were behind the creation of Bongo Comics itself. In late 1994, Steve Vance and his wife Cindy left Bongo Comics. The Bartman comic was put on hold and there was a gap of 9 months between Bartman #3 and #4. #4-6 contained a three-issue story arc written by Gary Glasberg and Bill Morrison, and with issue 6, Bartman was discontinued.

=== Itchy & Scratchy Comics ===
Cover to the first issue of Itchy & Scratchy Comics.

Itchy & Scratchy Comics was a short-lived series, and one of the four original series released in late 1993 with the start of Bongo Comics. The first issue was released on November 29, 1993, and only two more issues were released after that as well as one special edition, called Itchy & Scratchy Holiday Hi-Jinx. The comics tried to expand on two characters that really did not need any expanding, and the readers thought Itchy and Scratchy was best in short, violent bursts and that full-length stories only took away from the visceral shock of the cartoon, so the comic book series was canceled in 1994. Itchy & Scratchy continue to be featured in Simpsons Comics as short stories while Simpsons family members are watching TV.

There were three different versions of the first Itchy & Scratchy issue available at the time. One version came with a poster that could be combined with posters contained in Radioactive Man #1, Simpsons Comics #1 and Bartman #1 to make a giant poster. This version sold for US$2.25. Another version that came out at the same time only cost US$1.95, but had a bar code on the cover and did not come with a poster. The third and the rarest variant was a reprint of the comic and it had the top right portion of Bart Simpson's head covered over the original bar code. This version also cost US$1.95 and did not come with a poster.

In 1993, there was a signing at Golden Apple Comics in Los Angeles, where members of the Bongo Comics group autographed 500 copies of Itchy & Scratchy #1 and gave out a special Certificate of Authenticity (COA) with them. Each COA was individually numbered and had a raised seal stamped onto it.

=== Radioactive Man ===
Radioactive Man #1

Radioactive Man was one of the four "premiere" series released by Bongo Comics in late 1993. The series has been released in two volumes, an early run from 1993 to 1994, and the current run that's been going on since 2000. Smaller Radioactive Man stories have also been published in Simpsons Comics. As a tie-in promotion of The Simpsons Movie a special "Radioactive Man Comic Book Edition #711" was sold at 7-Elevens as part of their Kwik-E-Mart promotion.

Within the Bongo Comics, Radioactive Man is secretly Claude Kane III, a millionaire playboy whose personality was well-intentioned, but bumbling and not overly bright. In addition (which became a recurring storyline element), Claude's personality was permanently stuck in a conservative 1950s outlook on everything, no matter what the time era in question was. A running gag is that in order to preserve his secret identity, Claude is constantly wearing various types of hats, in order to conceal the lightning bolt-shaped shrapnel sticking out of his head.

Issue #1 of the Bongo comic differs from Radioactive Man #1 as seen in The Simpsons episode "Three Men and a Comic Book". While featuring a similar scenario and accident (Claude getting his trousers caught on barbed wire just before a mega-bomb explodes, parodying Bruce Banner getting caught by the Gamma Bomb in the Incredible Hulk #1), the Bongo series' Claude was not wearing tattered clothes. In the comic book, Claude's survival is due in part to a large thunderbolt-shaped shard of metal embedded in his head by the explosion. Claude would attempt to remove the bolt throughout the book series, but each attempt has nasty consequences which results in it being put back in his scalp again. Additionally, the bolt's presence would save his life numerous times in increasingly bizarre ways.

Maintaining the satirical standards of the television show, these comics often parodied genre comic books, and the reader can follow the evolution of Radioactive Man from a 1950s irradiated hero through the politically reactionary or radical years of the 1960s and 1970s, and the dark, troubled years of the 1980s and 1990s comic book hero. Indeed, one comic displays a startling similarity to Alan Moore's Watchmen, with Radioactive Man taking the part of state-supported hero Doctor Manhattan. The comics are published as if they were the actual Simpsons universe's Radioactive Man comics; a "1970s"-published comic features a letter written by a ten-year-old Marge Bouvier, for instance. The comic also takes the idea that the title has been running since the 1950s and each issue of the real series is a random issue from that run. So one issue might be issue #357, the next #432 and the next #567 etc.

Radioactive Man was merged with Simpsons Super Spectacular in 2005.

=== Bartman and Radioactive Man ===
Bartman and Radioactive Man was a 16-page one-shot released in 1994. The comic was featured in the Hero Illustrated magazine, and it contained a mini poster of Bartman and Radioactive Man. The story was written by Steve Vance.

=== Krusty Comics ===
Krusty Comics was another short-lived series, with three issues published from January to March 1995. Each one of these issues contained a part of a three-part story entitled The Rise and Fall of Krustyland, about Krusty the Clown opening an amusement park to pay back a gambling debt.

=== Lisa Comics ===
Lisa Comics was a one-shot, with the sole story being Lisa in Wordland, a parody of Alice in Wonderland. It was released in April 1995 and tells the tale of Lisa Simpson getting caught in an alternate reality called Wordland while chasing after a postman. The postman turns out to be Ned Flanders and while he gives her a tour through the wondrous world they get caught by Mr. Burns. Burns forces Lisa to battle him in a game of Scrabble; she accepts and after a while she gets upset and smashes the board. Suddenly she wakes up and discovers it's all a dream.

=== Simpsons Summer Special ===
Simpsons Summer Special was a one-issue comic book. It was printed in December 2001, and was only available in Australia and New Zealand.

=== The Simpsons Futurama Crossover Crisis ===
Cover of issue #1.

The Simpsons Futurama Crossover Crisis is a four-part, two-volume crossover between the worlds of Futurama and The Simpsons. Written by Simpsons Comics writer Ian Boothby and pencilled by James Lloyd, the series consists of Futurama Simpsons Infinitely Secret Crossover Crisis and The Simpsons Futurama Crossover Crisis II. Released as its own series independent of Simpsons Comics and Futurama Comics, part one was released on August 21, 2002, followed by part two on January 28, 2003. Parts three and four were published in 2005 as The Simpsons Futurama Crossover Crisis II. A hardcover edition comprising all four parts of the Crossover Crisis was published in 2010. Both shows would cross over on television in the episode "Simpsorama".

=== Comic Book Guy: The Comic Book ===
Comic Book Guy: The Comic Book is a five-part comic book mini-series starring the character Comic Book Guy. The five issues were released between July and November 2010.

=== The Simpsons Best Superhero Stories Ever! The Collector's Edition ===
The Simpsons Best Superhero Stories Ever! The Collector's Edition is a limited-edition comic book that was sold at the 2011 San Diego Comic-Con. It consists of five stories from Simpsons Comics Super Spectacular.

=== Bongo's Two One-Shot Wonders in One ===
Bongo's Two One-Shot Wonders in One is a limited-edition one-shot comic book that was available at the 2013 San Diego Comic-Con. It combines two titles from the Simpsons One-Shot Wonders line: The Malevolent Mr. Burns and Professor Frink's Fantastic Science Fictions.

=== The Greatest Bartman Stories Ever Told! ===
The Greatest Bartman Stories Ever Told! is a limited-edition one-shot comic book that was available only at the 2014 San Diego Comic-Con.

=== Simpsons Super Spectacular ===
Simpsons Super Spectacular was a comic book series published by Bongo Comics. It was first released in 2005 in the United States. The series acts as a continuation of the Radioactive Man comics with the inclusion of the Springfield-universe superheroes including Homer Simpson as Pieman, Bart Simpson as Bartman as well as Stretch Dude and Clobber Girl from the Simpsons episode "Treehouse of Horror X". Issue 10 also featured an adventure starring the 'Unleashed Legion', a superhero team composed of superhero versions of the Simpson family pets Santa's Little Helper and Snowball 2, Mr. Teeny (Krusty the Clown's pet chimpanzee) and a parrot owned by Captain McCallister. Simpsons Super Spectacular has ended on 17 October 2013.

== Reprint series and trade paperbacks ==
=== Simpsons Classics ===
Simpsons Classics (or Best of Simpsons Comics in the UK) is a series that publishes old issues of the Simpsons Comics. It has been released on a quarterly schedule every year since 2004, and each issue reprint two issues of the initial Simpsons Comics series.

=== Simpsons Comics trade paperbacks ===
Many Simpsons Comics have been reprinted and collected in trade paperbacks by the American publisher HarperCollins since 1994. Material from Krusty Comics, Lisa Comics, Bartman and Itchy & Scratchy Comics has also been included in the trade paperbacks.

Title	Issues	Release	ISBN
Simpsons Comics Extravaganza	Simpsons Comics #1-4	July 10, 1994	ISBN 0-06-095086-2
Simpsons Comics Spectacular	Simpsons Comics #6-9	June 23, 1995	ISBN 0-06-095148-6
Simpsons Comics Simpsorama	Simpsons Comics #11-14	May 5, 1996	ISBN 0-06-095199-0
Simpsons Comics Strike Back!	Simpsons Comics #15-18	October 11, 1996	ISBN 0-06-095212-1
Bartman: The Best of the Best	Simpsons Comics #5, Bartman #1-3, Itchy & Scratchy #3.	March 28, 1997	ISBN 1-85286-820-1
Simpsons Comics Wingding	Simpsons Comics #19-23	May 22, 1997	ISBN 0-06-095245-8
Simpsons Comics On Parade	Simpsons Comics #24-27	May 19, 1998	ISBN 0-06-095280-6
Simpsons Comics Big Bonanza	Simpsons Comics #28-31	January 27, 1999	ISBN 0-06-095317-9
Simpsons Comics A Go-Go	Simpsons Comics #32-35, 10	February 16, 2000	ISBN 0-06-095566-X
Simpsons Comics Royale	Simpsons Comics #50, Krusty #1-3, Lisa #1	March 6, 2001	ISBN 0-06-093378-X
Simpsons Comics Unchained	Simpsons Comics #36-42	March 19, 2002	ISBN 0-06-000797-4
Simpsons Comics Madness	Simpsons Comics #43-48	April 1, 2003	ISBN 0-06-053061-8
Simpsons Comics Belly Buster	Simpsons Comics #49, 51, 53-56	February 3, 2004	ISBN 0-06-058750-4
The Simpsons Holiday Humdinger	Simpsons Comics #15, 52, 79, Itchy and Scratchy special	November 1, 2004	ISBN 0-00-719170-7
Simpsons Comics Barn Burner	Simpsons Comics #57-61, 63	February 15, 2005	ISBN 0-06-074818-4
Simpsons Comics Jam-Packed Jamboree	Simpsons Comics #64-69	April 11, 2006	ISBN 0-06-087661-1
Simpsons Comics Beach Blanket Bongo	Simpsons Comics #71-75, 77	April 10, 2007	ISBN 0-06-123126-6
Simpsons Comics Dollars to Donuts	Simpsons Comics #59, #62, #78, #80, 82-84	April 9, 2008	ISBN 0-06-143697-6
Simpsons Comics Hit The Road!	Simpsons Comics #85, #86, 88-90	April 7, 2009	ISBN 0-06-169881-4
Simpsons Comics Get Some Fancy Book Learnin'	Simpsons Comics #62, #70, #76, #126, #148	April 6, 2010	ISBN 0-06-195787-9
Simpsons Comics Meltdown	Simpsons Comics #91-95	April 12, 2011	ISBN 0-06-203653-X
Simpsons Comics Confidential	Simpsons Comics #96-99	March 27, 2012	ISBN 0-06-211532-4
Simpsons Comics Supernova	Simpsons Comics #81, 101–103, The Simpsons Summer Shindig #2	February 1, 2013	ISBN 978-0-06-225438-2
Simpsons Comics Shake-Up	Simpsons Comics #105-108, The Simpsons Summer Shindig #1, #3	February 4, 2014	ISBN 0-06-230185-3
Simpsons Comics Clubhouse	Simpsons Comics #109-111, The Simpsons Summer Shindig #4-5	February 3, 2015	ISBN 0-06-236060-4
Simpsons Comics Chaos	Simpsons Comics #112-115, The Simpsons Summer Shindig #6	February 2, 2016	ISBN 0-06-241947-1
Simpsons Comics Knockout	Simpsons Comics #115-120	February 21, 2017	ISBN 0-06-256891-4
Simpsons Comics Game On!	Simpsons Comics #121-125	February 6, 2018	ISBN 0-06-269251-8
Simpsons Comics Showstopper	Simpsons Comics #127-129, 132-133	February 5, 2019	ISBN 0-06-287877-8
Simpsons Comics Colossal Compendium Volume One	Radioactive Man #8, Simpsons Comics #150, #156, #161, #172, #182, #184, Simpsons Super Spectacular #1, #2, The Simpsons Summer Shindig #1, #3	July 30, 2013	ISBN 0-06-226775-2
Simpsons Comics Colossal Compendium Volume Two	Radioactive Man #100, Simpsons Comics #154, 163, 169, 180, Simpsons Super Spectacular #3, 8, The Simpsons Summer Shindig #3, 4, 6	July 22, 2014	ISBN 0-06-233609-6
Simpsons Comics Colossal Compendium Volume Three	Bart Simpson #48, Bart Simpson's Pal, Milhouse Comics #1, Li'l Homer #1, Maggie #1, The Malevolent Mr. Burns #1, Professor Frink's Fantastic Science Fictions #1, Ralph Wiggum Comics #1, Simpsons Comics #155, #162, #180, # 186, Simpsons Super Spectacular #9	July 7, 2015	ISBN 0-06-236059-0
Simpsons Comics Colossal Compendium Volume Four	Bart Simpson's Pal, Milhouse Comics #1, Duffman Adventures #1, Li'l Homer #1, Maggie #1, The Malevolent Mr. Burns #1, Ralph Wiggum Comics #1, Simpsons Comics #194, #198, The Simpsons Summer Shindig #5, #7, #8, Simpsons Winter Wingding #8, The Wonderful World of Lisa Simpson #1	July 5, 2016	ISBN 0-06-242326-6
Simpsons Comics Colossal Compendium Volume Five	Bart Simpson #85, Kang & Kodos #1, The Malevolent Mr. Burns #1, Professor Frink's Fantastic Science Fictions #1, Ralph Wiggum Comics #1, Simpsons Comics #203, #208, #210, #220 The Simpsons Summer Shindig #8, #9, Simpsons Super Spectacular #7, #15	July 4, 2017	ISBN 0-06-256754-3
Simpsons Comics Colossal Compendium Volume Six	Li'l Homer #1, McBain #1, Maggie #1, Simpsons Comics #212-213, #223, #230-231, Simpsons Super Spectacular #13, The Simpsons' Treehouse of Horror #21, Simpsons Winter Wingding #9	July 3, 2018	ISBN 0-06-269253-4
Simpsons Comics Colossal Compendium Volume Seven	Grampa Simpson #1, Simpsons Comics #171, #184, #232-223, #235-236, Simpsons Summer Shindig #7, #9, Simpsons Super Spectacular #11	July 2, 2019	ISBN 0-06-287880-8
Simpsons Comics: Homer For The Holidays	Simpsons Winter Wingding #1-3	October 8, 2010	ISBN 0-06-187673-9
The Simpsons Futurama Crossover Crisis	Futurama Simpsons Infinitely Secret Crossover Crisis #1-2, The Simpsons Futurama Crossover Crisis II #1-2, Simpsons Comics #1 (loose reprint), Simpsons Comics #87	April 1, 2010	ISBN 0-8109-8837-2

=== Bart Simpson's Treehouse of Horror paperbacks ===
Trade paperbacks collecting most of the issues of the Bart Simpson's Treehouse of Horror series have been released since 1999 by HarperCollins.

Title	Issues	Release	ISBN
Treehouse of Horror: Heebie-Jeebie Hullabaloo	collects issues #1-3	September 8, 1999	ISBN 0-06-098762-6
Treehouse of Horror: Spine-Tingling Spooktacular	collects issues #4-6	September 18, 2001	ISBN 0-06-093714-9
Treehouse of Horror: Fun Filled Frightfest	collects issues #6-7	September 2, 2003	ISBN 0-06-056070-3
Treehouse of Horror: Hoodoo Voodoo Brouhaha	collects issues #8-9	September 19, 2006	ISBN 0-06-114872-5
Treehouse of Horror: Dead Man's Jest	collects issues #10-11	August 26, 2008	ISBN 0-06-157135-0
Treehouse of Horror: From Beyond the Grave	collects issues #12-13	August 23, 2011	ISBN 978-0-06-206900-9

=== Bart Simpson paperbacks ===
Issues of the Bart Simpson series have been collected and published in trade paperbacks yearly from 2002 to 2015 by HarperCollins.

Title	Issues	Release	ISBN
Big Book of Bart Simpson	collects issues #1-4	July 9, 2002	ISBN 0-06-008469-3
Big Bad Book of Bart Simpson	collects issues #5-8	June 17, 2003	ISBN 0-06-055590-4
Big Bratty Book of Bart Simpson	collects issues #9-12	July 6, 2004	ISBN 0-06-072178-2
Big Beefy Book of Bart Simpson	collects issues #13-16	May 31, 2005	ISBN 0-06-074819-2
Big Bouncy Book of Bart Simpson	collects issues #17-20	May 2, 2006	ISBN 0-06-112455-9
Big Beastly Book of Bart Simpson	collects issues #21-24	April 3, 2007	ISBN 0-06-123128-2
Big Brilliant Book of Bart Simpson	collects issues #25-28	May 6, 2008	ISBN 0-06-145022-7
Bart Simpson: Son Of Homer	collects issues #29-33	July 1, 2009	ISBN 0-06-169879-2
Bart Simpson: Class Clown	collects issues #33-37	May 18, 2010	ISBN 0-06-197629-6
Bart Simpson: Prince of Pranks	collects issues #38-42	May 17, 2011	ISBN 0-06-204500-8
Bart Simpson: Out to Lunch	collects issues #43-47	April 10, 2012	ISBN 0-06-211533-2
Bart Simpson: Big Shot	collects issues #48-52	April 9, 2013	ISBN 0-06-226254-8
Bart Simpson: To the Rescue!	collects issues #53-54, #56-58	April 8, 2014	ISBN 0-06-230183-7
Bart Simpson: Blast Off	collects issues #55, #59-62	April 3, 2015	ISBN 978-1-78329-658-3
Bart Simpson: Master of Disaster	Bart Simpson #63-67	April 5, 2016	ISBN 0-06-241951-X
Bart Simpson: Suckerpunch	Bart Simpson #68-72, The Simpsons Summer Shindig #7	April 11, 2017	ISBN 0-06-256893-0
Bart Simpson: Bust-Up	Bart Simpson #73-77, The Simpsons Summer Shindig #7	April 3, 2018	ISBN 0-06-269255-0
Bart Simpson Breaks Out	Bart Simpson #78-83	April 2, 2019	ISBN 0-06-287873-5

== See also ==
- List of The Simpsons books
- Futurama Comics
