= Roswell, Little Green Man =

Roswell, Little Green Man is a Bongo Comics series created by Bill Morrison. It was nominated for four Eisner Awards. The series debuted in 1996 with a four-part story in the back pages of Simpsons Comics #19-22, which was followed by its own title that ran for six issues. The original Simpsons Comics serial and the first three issues of the main series (covering Roswell's origin story) were reprinted in the trade paperback collection Roswell Walks Among Us in 1997.

In an interview with Neatorama, Morrison said, "Roswell, Little Green Man was inspired by the story of the Roswell UFO crash, but also by my desire to draw vintage cars, fashions, architecture, etc. from the 1940s. I was also influenced heavily by Dave Stevens' wonderful Rocketeer strip."
