= Bill Morrison (comics) =

American comics creator

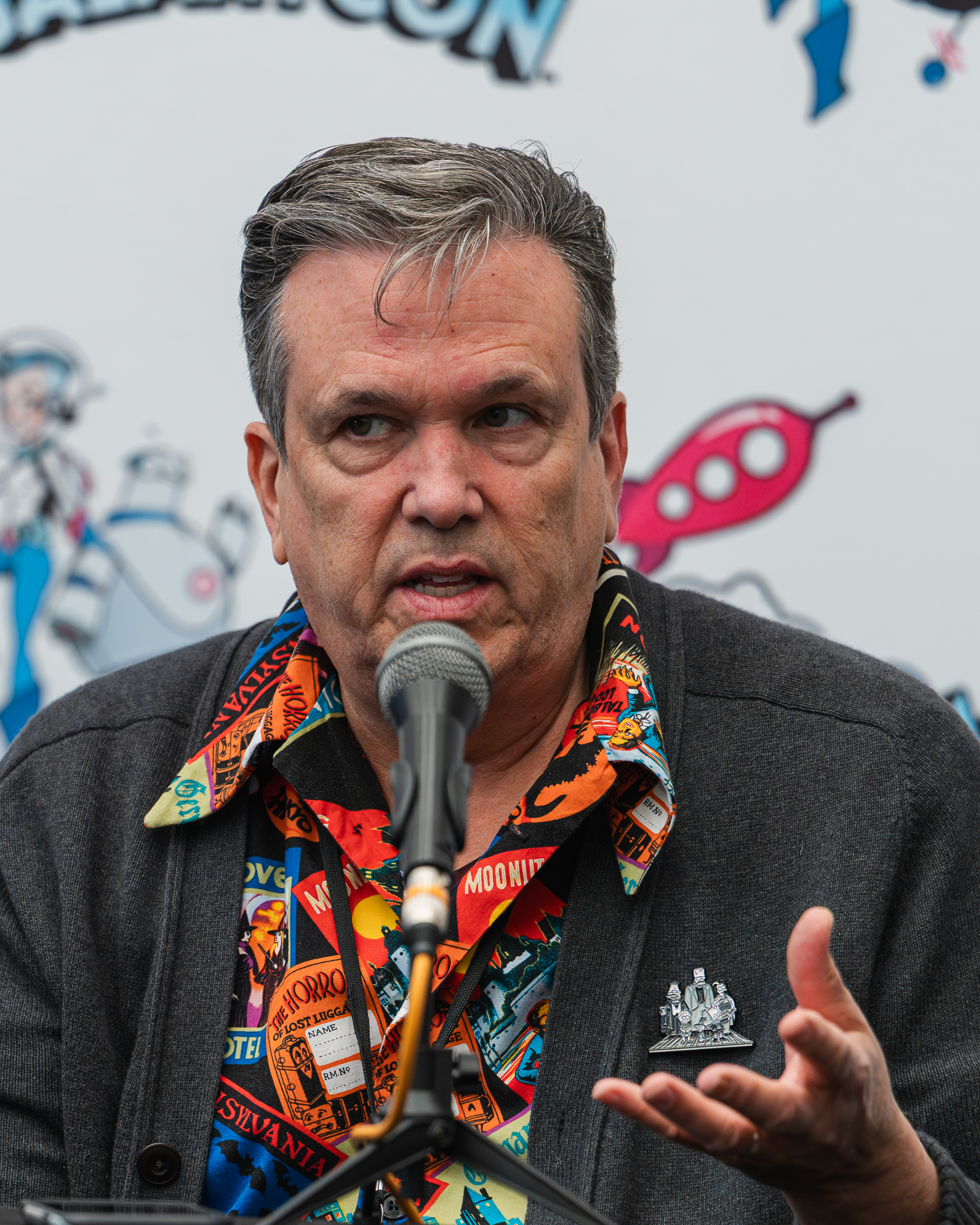
- Morrison at GalaxyCon Oklahoma City in 2026
- Born: 1959 (age 66–67) Lincoln Park, Michigan, US
- Areas: Writer, Artist, Editor
- Notable works: Bongo Comics; MAD magazine

Bill Morrison (born 1959) is an American comic book artist, writer, and editor. He is a co-founder of Bongo Comics (along with Matt Groening and Steve and Cindy Vance).

== Early life ==
Morrison is a native of Lincoln Park, Michigan, a Downriver suburb of Detroit. He attended the College for Creative Studies.

== Career ==
At the beginning of his career in the early 1980s, Morrison worked as a technical illustrator for Artech, Inc. (Livonia, Michigan) before going to work as an illustrator for Disney, where he created promotional art for:

- Lady and the Tramp
- Cinderella
- Bambi
- Peter Pan
- The Jungle Book
- Robin Hood
- The Rescuers
- The Fox and the Hound
- Oliver & Company
- The Little Mermaid (including a controversial image)
- “Roller Coaster Rabbit”
- “The Prince and the Pauper”
- The Rescuers Down Under

Subsequently, he worked as an illustrator and occasional writer for The Simpsons and created his own comic Roswell. He also served as a director for Futurama.

Morrison was the creative director of Bongo Comics from 1993 to 2012.

In 1998, Morrison illustrated (although it was signed by Matt Groening) the cover artwork of The Simpsons' The Yellow Album. His cover was a parody of the cover art for the Beatles album Sgt. Pepper's Lonely Hearts Club Band, replaced with characters from The Simpsons. In 2005, the artist and designer Kaws (commissioned by Nigo) created The Kaws Album, a "traced interpretation" of The Yellow Album. In 2019, Sotheby's auction house in Hong Kong sold The Kaws Album for 115.9 million Hong Kong dollars, or about $14.7 million U.S. dollars, a new auction record for the artist at the time. re-igniting a conversation about the appropriation of commercial illustrations for fine art (see Roy Lichtenstein).

Morrison is an Eagle Scout in the Boy Scouts of America (BSA); he created the mural A Century of Values to celebrate the BSA centennial in 2010.

On the occasion of the fiftieth anniversary of Yellow Submarine, The Beatles' 1968 animated feature film, Titan Comics published, on August 28, 2018, a hardcover comicbook illustrated by Morrisson.

He was the executive editor of MAD magazine from early 2018 (beginning with the rebooted issue #1 dated June 2018) to March 2019.

In July 2025, Bill was named as Special Ambassador for the Inkwell Awards.
