= Futurama Comics =

Comic book series

- The front cover of issue #1
- Story: Multiple (based on characters created by Matt Groening)
- Ink: Multiple
- Date: November 22, 2000 - July 18, 2018
- Pages: 25
- First publication: November 22, 2000

Futurama Comics is a comic book series based on the television show Futurama published by Bongo Comics. It has been published bi-monthly in the United States since November 2000 (apart from a brief break for the crossover). It has been published in the United Kingdom (with an altered order) and Australia since 2002 and four trade paperbacks have been released. During the production hiatus between 2003 and 2006 and from 2013 to 2023, with few exceptions, it was the only new Futurama material being made. The comic book series continues its run, even after two cancellations of the TV series. Issues #82 and #83 were distributed via the Futuramaland app, and will not be physically printed.

== Premise ==
In the year 3000, the crew of the Planet Express delivery company make cargo shipments to unusual planets, as well as having adventures back on Earth. The main characters include Philip J. Fry, a slacker from the 20th century who was cryogenically frozen for 1,000 years, cycloptic ship captain Leela, and an alcohol-fueled, troublemaking robot Bender. The comic will often make more use of supporting or minor characters than the series, such as Zapp Brannigan, Cubert Farnsworth, the Robot Devil and Inez Wong.

== Format ==
Each issue consists of at least one story of around 27 pages (occasionally brief stories also appear), and a letters and fanart page. There are also full-page mock advertisements marketing futuristic products (such as Brain Slugs), which parody the kinds of coupon offers found in other comic books.
Special editions of some issues are published on occasion; a variant of the first issue available only at Comic Con 2000 featured a golden background, rather than red.

In a similar vein to the parent series, each issue features a humorous caption on the cover (for example, "Made In The USA! (Printed in Canada)"). These captions also vary according to where it is sold. Coinciding with the change in format in issue 59, the caption was abandoned, along with the original logo. Each issue is a self-contained story which lasts one issue (though the Time Bender Trilogy spanned three issues) and it is printed in the standard 6 5/8 in × 10 1/4 in (170 mm × 260 mm) size.

After issue 81, the print edition was cancelled and issue 82 was released as a digital-only comic.

== Issues ==
Issue #	Title	Plot summary	Caption	Release date
1	Monkey Sea, Monkey Doom!	While digging a large hole to hide one of Professor Farnsworth's inventions that he's hiding from the police, Fry, Bender and Leela find a time capsule from the 20th century. This capsule has loads of old junk in it, and Fry, seeing this, begins to miss all the things he used to have. While reading an old comic, he finds an ad for some sea monkeys, and purchases some from an old store that sells 20th-century stuff. Unfortunately, the sea monkeys don't impress his friends as much as he wanted them to; at least not until they come into contact with the professor's gamma radiation, and begin to grow, and grow, and grow!	FEISTY FIRST ISSUE!	November 22, 2000
2	...But Deliver Us to Evil!	Planet Express wins an award; Most Efficient Delivery Company on Weekends and Holidays. Soon after, some aliens named Lucy and Ricky hire the crew to take a package somewhere for them and insist on coming with them on the delivery to see what makes Planet Express so great. But soon the crew are attacked by space pirates, and then they discover that the two visitors aren't all they make themselves out to be.	SLIMY SECOND ISSUE!	January 24, 2001
3	The Owner of Mars Attacks!	The gang head to a flea market where Leela discovers some collectible creatures called 'Needy Newbies' that she finds really cute. Inez Wong apparently also collects them, and she treats Leela to one, as well as inviting her to a weekly collectors meeting at her place. She and Zoidberg both go, but when a selfish Inez doesn't let her or anybody else talk about their collections because she only brags about hers, Leela swears that she will stop Inez from getting the whole collection. The race to get the last two Newbies begins.	NEW VERSION 3.0!	March 28, 2001
4	D.O.O.P. the Right Thing!	Captain Zapp Brannigan of the D.O.O.P. is lost on the jungles of a planet known as Da Nang 4, whose natives are at war with the Democratic Order of Planets. A message to Kif from Zapp reveals he has been made the king of a native tribe and he requests that a one-eyed queen be sent to him, specifically Leela. Leela reluctantly goes to Da Nang 4 and while she and Kif go to find Zapp, Bender and Fry look for some booze on the planet	BLOATED WITH COMEDY (in Alien Language 1)	May 23, 2001
5	Who's Dying to Be a Gazillionaire?	Seems like the Professor owes the IRS a million dollars, and Fry sees the only way of getting the money is to go on the deadliest game show on Earth: Morbo's Who's Dying to Be a Gazillionaire. This game show has one major difference over the one that it's parodying: If you go for $1,000,000 plus, and get the answer wrong, you die!	PRESENTED IN 2-D! NO GLASSES NEEDED! _{(UNLESS YOU NEED GLASSES)}	July 25, 2001
6	Xmas Time Is Fear	The plot premise involves an alliance between three of the galaxy's most evil villains: The Robot Devil, Santa Claus and Richard Nixon's Head. Basically, the Robot Devil tries to get Bender (amongst other robots) to gather everybody of New New York into Times Square, with the message that Robot Santa has been reprogrammed to be nice. However, the real fact is that Santa hasn't changed at all, and is preparing to slaughter everybody there. To discover the motives for Beelzebot and Nixon, you'll have to read it.	PRINTED IN MINT CONDITION!	October 24, 2001
7	New Year's Rockin' Evil	# It's New Year's Eve 3001. After a cameo from Nick Clark (the great, great, great, etc. grandson of Dick Clark's Head.) there is a power outage, thanks to the Professor's New Year's ball that takes up too much power. To pass the time, the crew decide to look at the What-If? Machine, although only one question is asked this time... with Bender posing what would happen if he travelled back to 1999. And in a parody of The Terminator, we discover that on the night Fry is to be frozen, someone from the future has gone back to stop the event from ever happening...	NO ANIMATED CHARACTERS WERE HARMED IN THE MAKING OF THIS COMIC BOOK!	January 23, 2002
8	Planet X-Press Men	In this parody of The X-Men, Professor F (Farnsworth) and his school of mutant rejects are visited by a strange robot named Benderine (Bender) and decide to take him into their team, despite some objections from Uniclops (Leela) because he has been created by Momento (yeah, you guessed it... Mom.) The rest of the crew are parodies on some of the major X-Men characters, these being Wonder Boy (Fry), Rouge (Amy), The Weather Mon (Hermes), and Lobstrocity (Zoidberg)	A NEW HIGH IN LOWBROW ENTERTAINMENT!	March 27, 2002
9	Freaky Fry-Day	Great Nephew Day has arrived, and Fry gets the Professor a present in the form of a glowing green rock that is legally distinct from Kryptonite on by the fact that it's not called by the same name. Also, its effects on Superman are unknown. Its effects on Fry and the Professor, if they both wear it simultaneously around their necks, is that once they both sleep, they will awaken with the other's body. The only thing is, the Professor wants to keep it a secret for a while so that he can use Fry's body to be young again, while Fry is just presumed to be the Professor acting insane and he's taken away.	MADE IN THE U.S.A.! _{(PRINTED IN CANADA)}	May 22, 2002
10	The Big Sweep	After an ash-fall on NNYC, which is rather like a snowfall but with meteor ash instead of being fallen precipitation from clouds as frozen ice crystals, Scruffy discovers some smooth white rocks and decides to teach Fry, Bender and Leela the sport of "swirling" where you move a rock into a bullseye on ice. Yes, somehow falling ash automatically freezes the water too, but anyway... Scruffy discovers the three are all naturals. But he's not the only one, and a washed-up swirling coach named Vic Lebruteski decides to take the whole crew under his wing for the next Olympics. Leela doesn't quite trust him though.	HOW'S MY DRAWING? CALL 1-800-555-MATT!	November 27, 2002
11	The Cure For the Common Clod	Fry gets the old 20th-century disease of influenza, otherwise known as the common cold. Unfortunately, it isn't quite as common as it once was. After being put into Bubble Boy style containment, it turns out Leela, Hermes and Amy have picked it up too. But it affects the populace of the 31st century a lot differently, making them all revert to primal tendencies. The Professor, Bender and Zoidberg, whom are all immune to the effects of it, race around trying to get the others contained before more get infected.	THE MOST INFLUENZAL COMIC OF ALL TIME!	January 22, 2003
12	Sideshow Fry	The crew go to see a circus, and while waiting for the show to start come across a freak show. Fry here reveals that he's got an "outie" as they call it, which is basically that his belly button sticks out. Apparently this trait was considered to be, as Leela puts it, "The O.J. Simpson of body parts" in their time. Fry is spotted by the circus' freak-show runner and he and the ring master capture Fry as one of their own freaks, whereupon he finds life isn't so bad and falls in love with a bearded woman. Meanwhile, Bender plots revenge on cannon-shooter extraordinaire The Unhuman Cannonball, aka a robot named Dewey whom Bender knew during his brief stint as a military cook. Jealous that Dewey took over his job unfairly, Bender seeks his justice by replacing him for the circus' main event.	LET YOUR FREAK FLAG FRY	March 26, 2003
13	The Bender You Say	Bender's luck at cooking isn't going too well, especially after the health inspector drops by. Bender looks for another job, an it just so happens that The Robot Devil is willing to make Bender his cook. Unfortunately, it seems that Bender's cooking kills ol' Beelzebot, so Bender steps into his place. And, uh... yeah. Hilarity ensues.	STICK A FORK IN IT...IT'S FUN!	May 28, 2003
14	Six Characters In Search of a Story	Bongo Comics proudly presents the first comic in history that can be read seven different ways. Six characters unleash a handful of Professor Farnsworth's better to be forgotten inventions on the third planet from the Sun for a sequential tour de force that you'll never forget.	MEAT-BAG TESTED, BENDER APPROVED!	July 23, 2003
15	Fry Me to the Moon!	Fry's dreams come true when he is offered the chance of a lifetime—to play the part of his childhood comic book hero Space Boy in a big budget, special effects filled, motion picture extravaganza! But the life of a Hollywood star and superhero is not all its cracked up to be, and nothing can prepare him for the movie's surprise twist ending!	I CAN'T BELIEVE IT'S NOT ANIMATED!	October 8, 2003
16	Kickin' It Old School	When Professor Farnsworth's clone Cubert shows a slight dip in his studies and a decrease in his IQ, he is sent across the galaxy in search of a school that will save his brain from atrophying. But Cubert's not the only one sent off to boarding school. Fry, Leela, and Bender find themselves trapped in the Blackboard Jungle as well. Join us for the prologue to "The Time Bender Trilogy" - a special Futurama story arc - in four parts!	NOT YOUR GRANDFATHER'S FUTURAMA!	February 4, 2004
17	The Time Bender Trilogy - part one	Fry, Leela, Bender, and Cubert return to Earth from last issue's outer space adventure at boarding school only to find the planet Earth complete uninhabited. But before they can figure out where everyone has gone, they are forced to defend the planet from alien invaders who try to claim it under Intergalactic Planetary Salvage Laws.	4 OUT OF 5 ALIENS RECOMMEND...	May 26, 2004
18	The Time Bender Trilogy - part two: Boned to the Future	After defending their recently uninhabited world from alien invaders, Fry, Leela, and Bender set out to discover the whereabouts of their missing colleagues as well as billions of citizens from Planet Earth. But "where are they?" soon turns into "when are they?" and "how" and "why" also make a little appearance in Part 2 of "Time Bender Trilogy."	NOMINATED FOR 12 GLORVNAXX AWARDS!	July 28, 2004
19	The Time Bender Trilogy - part III	Fry is caught in the midst of an interplanetary war, Leela has angered the gods in Ancient Greece, Bender is on trial in Salem, Mass., and the Planet Express crew along with Earth's entire population have been transported back to the Age of Dinosaurs. Will the world ever get back to normal, or is everyone totally boned? Find out in the exciting, time-bending conclusion of Bongo's biggest and best ever "thrill"-ogy!	MORE FUN THAN A BARREL OF BRAIN SLUGS!	September 29, 2004
20	Bender Breaks Out	Never before in the history of comics has there been an issue quite like this one! Bender, feeling under-appreciated, goes off on a mind-bending, time-twisting, space continuum-shattering odyssey that will take him across the galaxy and through the offices of Bongo Comics in a mad, mad, mad, mad chase. Only you, dear reader, will be able to bring him back when "Bender Breaks Out!"	BIG ~~ZOIDBERG~~ BENDER ISSUE	June 8, 2005
21	More Than a Filling!	Fry goes to the dentist for the first time in years and there are strange signals coming from his mouth. Nobody knows where they are from until Planet Express learned they were from an alien race, and everything goes okay until Fry grinds his teeth in his sleep	Presented in BENDER-VISION	October 12, 2005
22	A Fit Worse Than Death	Bender becomes the 31st century's newest diet guru, and before long President Nixon appoints him czar of the President's Council on Physical Fitness. But too much power in the wrong robot's hands is a dangerous thing, and the physically tired and huddled masses of New New York City are soon yearning to be free of Bender's tyrannical exercise regimen.	No caption	November 23, 2005
23	The A-Team	While performing space doughnuts, the Planet Express ship creates a vortex to another dimension, which releases another ship crewed by their predecessors, who have been trapped in a void for years. They have used this time to better themselves, and when they arrive back on Earth Leela and her colleagues are fired. As the old crew's identity numbers were reused, Leela and the others are now non-persons and Hermes makes them wear T-shirts declaring this, so that everyone will ignore them as the law requires. The crew have to find a way to get their jobs back.	HEY MEATBAG! BUY THIS COMIC OR BACK OFF!	February 1, 2006
24	Twice Told Tales of Interest	As in the tradition of Futurama's annual "Anthology of Interest" episodes, Bongo Comics presents an issue of inquisitive inquiries and questionable queries that will boggle the mind when Professor Farnsworth's What If Machine reveals the alternate pasts, presents, and futures of the Planet Express crew. Witness the Santa Robot's reign of terror when we dare answer the question "What if it was X-mas every day?" Then Fry poses the question, "What if my life was more like a sit-com?"	WHAT IF YOU BOUGHT THIS COMIC?	March 22, 2006
25	Robot Robin Hood	Gather 'round and hear tell of the three "deliverers" who fell from the sky, and liberated the good and filthy people of Bottingham... and of the metal rebel who threw off the chains of oppression and over taxation and without faint heart challenged the dastardly sheriff the one who robbed from the rich, gave some to the poor, and kept most of it for himself Robot Hood! Hear ye! Hear ye!	NOW WITH MORE FUTURE, LESS RAMA!	May 24, 2006
26	A Whole Lotta Leela!	After a freak accident with Bender's Time Rifle, Leela is blown to past, present, and future bits, dividing her into her toddler, teen, and elderly selves. Anyway you look at it, there's a whole lotta Leela going on.	THE #1 SELLING COMIC OF 3006	July 26, 2006
27	Rotten to the Core	When the Earth is wrecked by weather anomalies that threaten to destroy the entire planet, the Planet Express crew must travel to the inner core to find out what or who has caused the world to fall off of its orbit...	KEEP ON TREKKIN'!	October 4, 2006
28	Let's Twist Again	After making a delivery to the offices of one of Fry and Bender's favorite TV shows, The Scary Door, the Planet Express crew find themselves transported to a parallel dimension of sight and sound, talking dolls, and roadside diners and dates with Death and a lot of ironic plot twists! Will they ever escape? Ironically, not until they make plans to stay!	PLEASE READ RESPONSIBLY!	November 22, 2006
29	Downsized!	Fry, Leela, and Bender are downsized in order to make an annual delivery of glass cleaner to a bottle city, but they soon find themselves trapped in a world on the brink of devastation, proving the old adage, 'Those who live in glass houses, shouldn't launch nuclear attacks'.	APPLY DIRECTLY WHERE IT HURTS!	January 24, 2007
30	Fry & the Double-Bag, Must-Have Item!	One of the benefits of living 1,000 years into the future is that all your worthless junk can suddenly become very valuable. Fry starts his own Internet auction business, but is some evil bidder doing the evil bidding of an evil biddy?	GET YOUR 30TH CENTURY FIX!	March 28, 2007
31	As the Wormhole Turns	Leela takes Nibbler to the veterinarian and gets some shocking news. Her cute little Nibblonian has worms! Worms that cause wormholes. Nibbler's disgusting ability to open portals to new worlds at the drop of a, well, you know, is at first considered a blessing, until the two-way wormholes put the DOOP in deep doo-doo!	DARK MATTER HAPPENS!	May 23, 2007
32	Doctor What	The Good Crustacean Doctor, Zoidberg, finds himself playing the role of The Doctor from Doctor Who.	IN SPACE, NO ONE CAN HEAR YOU READ!	July 25, 2007
33	Attack of the 50-Foot Amy	Amy becomes a 50-foot giant and Bender becomes a video pirate.	CONSULT A DOCTOR IF LAUGHTER LASTS MORE THAN 4 HOURS!	September 26, 2007
34	Planet Michelle	A thousand years ago, Philip J. Fry bought a star from the star registry for his girlfriend Michelle, which has since been upgraded to planet status. After being rebuffed by Leela for the 1,000th time, Fry reconnects with his 30th century-shy ex, and together they inhabit a planet all their own.	ATOMIC BATTERIES NOT INCLUDED!	November 28, 2007
35	Son of the Sun	From the files of the Secret Justice Team comes a tale of derring-do and action-packed action, as Captain Yesterday (Fry), Clobberella (Leela) and Super King (Bender) face the vengeful wrath of the spawn of one of the greatest villains from their decidedly small Rogues Gallery, The Sun.	INTELLIGENTLY DESIGNED!	January 2008
36	You Don't Wanna Know Jak!	Fry, Leela, and Bender are off on another adventure, when they make a delivery to New New New England, a planet very much like Victorian England where they find themselves in the midst of a mystery that needs solving and a serial deleter, Jak the Ripper, who is erasing the memories of unsuspecting robots. Also, feeling a little left out, Amy, Hermes, and Zoidburg go on an earthbound adventure of their own with less-than-stellar results.	Science FACT! (As Far As You Know!)	March 26, 2008
37	Full Metal Racket	Leela and Fry are abducted by members of Aliens for the Ethical Treatment of Humans and "liberated" on a nearby farm planet. But they soon find out there is nothing safe about a planet populated by vicious Transfarmers. Meanwhile, Bender's latest get rich scheme goes haywire, reversing the robot's magnetism, and making him more repellant than ever.	The Yoke's on You!	May 28, 2008
38	Rumble in the Jungle	Leela gets little respect as captain from Fry and Bender. But when the Planet Express ship crash lands on a jungle planet, scattering the crew, Leela's made queen by the local natives, while Fry, finding the lifeless and strip-mined body of Bender, decides to seek revenge on those who killed his best friend. There's a rumble in the jungle this July!	YIVO LOVES YOU	July 30, 2008
39	Rust in Peace	When you've time-traveled as much as Bender has, it can really cause a lot of wear and tear on the ol' motherboard. That's why the recently manufactured robot finds himself forced into early retirement at a nursing home for aged automatons, and unless Fry and Leela find a way to set him free, Bender's very likely to 'rust in peace.' Everything old is new again this September!	BOOTHBY - LLOYD - PEPOY	September 24, 2008
40	Robot Santa's Little Helpers	It's time for another traditional, ultra-violent Xmas in the 30th century, when Bender takes on a job as a mall Santa Robot. Without Bender, Fry and Leela take Dr. Zoidberg along as the Planet Express ship's cook on a delivery mission to Santa Robot's home planet of Neptune. What no one expects is an evil plot for robot world domination and what might very well be the last Xmas ever! Hold on to your deer-bot, it's another lovely slay ride this November!	ROGERS - KAZALEH - DAVIS	November, 2008
41	Soldier Boys	Dean are sent off to DOOP space cadet camp on Mars along with Leela and Fry as camp counselors, but the camp is a front for President Nixon's far more devious plan! Meanwhile, Bender takes the opportunity to reconnect with his ol' fraternity brothers at Robot House and is in for a surprise of his own. Blast off on a comic misadventure this January!	ROGERS - DELANEY - DAVIS	January, 2009
42	Homeward Boned	The fossilized remains of Fry's loyal 20th-century canine Seymour go missing, and in no time the Planet Express crew find themselves on Sirius K-9, a planet inhabited entirely by man's best friend. But it soon becomes apparent that dogs and delivery men don't mix, and the inhabitants of Earth better get ready to beg or they will soon roll over and play dead - for real! Cry havoc, and let slip the dogs of war!	ROGERS - DELANEY - DAVIS	March 25, 2009
43	Welcome to My NightMall	Fry finds himself short on cash, so he moonlights for a company that specializes in selling products to people while they sleep. But when Fry finds himself in the middle of one of Leela's dreams, he decides to do everything in his power to make her dream come true.	BOOTHBY - DELANEY - DAVIS	May 27, 2009
44	The Fry and the Furious!	Fry and Zapp Brannigan challenge each other to a space race to the end of universe, and Leela's in for a big surprise when she discovers that she's the prize. However, the biggest surprise awaits the wacky racers on a cannonball run to deep space - the absolute nothingness and utter void at the finish line!	CHICKS DIG GUYS WHO READ...	July 29, 2009
45	Anthology of Interest II	The Anthology of Interest is back! Find out what is in store for the Planet Express crew when Professor Farnsworth cranks up his new and improved What-If Machine. What if...Bender ruled the world? What if...Leela fell in love with Fry? What if...Leela had a normal childhood? And what if...Zoidberg finally got a chance to ask a 'What if...?' question!	LOBSTERPALOOZA	September 30, 2009
46	Follow the Reader	First, Futurama Comics brought you 'Six Characters in Search of a Story,' the issue that allowed you to follow one character from page to page in the same comic panel. Then it brought you 'Bender Breaks Out,' the story that made you bend it to end it. Now comes 'Follow the Reader' a story that follows you, the reader, as you, the reader, follows the story. Huh?!	PLEASE BEND RESPONSIBLY!	November 25, 2009
47	Chitty Chitty Bend Bend	When Professor Farnsworth's latest invention gives Bender the ability to fly, the misanthropic robot finds that he has the power to save the world. But with great power comes great responsibility, and Bender wants no part of it.	100% SPRUNGE-WORTHY!	January 27, 2010
48	Claw and Order	Doctor Zoidberg leaves the medical profession to pursue his parents' dream for him of becoming an attorney, while Bender goes off to fulfill a solo delivery to the White House only to be deemed a traitor by the DOOP In the meantime, Fry unsuspectingly unleashes a plague of podcast people on New New York City!	PLANET EXPRESS GOES GREEN... REALLY, REALLY GREEN!	March 24, 2010
49	Dummy Up!	Prepare yourself for the successfully comedic pairing of Bender and his ventriloquist dummy friend, Small Fry. However, things go awry when big and real Fry believes the dummy plans to take over his life. Meanwhile, Leela looks for a way to remove stress from her life and attain inner peace.	SIZE MURDERS!	May 26, 2010
50	Your Mother Wears Pilot Boots	This month, Bongo celebrates Futurama Comics' 'Big 5-0!' When Mom goes off on her annual vacation, she leaves Mom Corp. in the hands of her nitwit sons. Unable to control the company themselves, they look for an imposing and strong-willed woman who will fill their mother's shoes, but they need look no further than an all-too-willing Leela, who is looking for some respect.	BONUS MIND BENDING BLACK LIGHT POSTER INSIDE!	July 2010
51	Fry Cook	Bender and Fry battle it out in a kitchen nightmare of their own making to determine who will be top chef at Planet Express; however, they will be forced to make the meal of their lives when some unwelcome dinner guests come to call! Also, Zapp Brannigan and Kif go on a blind date! Plus, this issue features the second of six awesome Futurama posters, suitable for unfolding!	THE BLACK LIGHT BONANZA CONTINUES!	September 2010
52	Ro-Botox	Looking to put the shine back in his shiniest body part, Bender undergoes a series of robotic enhancements. However, one 'nip' here and one 'tuck' there prove not to be enough for the rejuvenated robot, and before long he is on a path to destruction. Also, Zapp Brannigan shows his mettle and earns a medal. Plus, this issue features the third of six awesome Futurama posters, suitable for unfolding!	COLLECTIBLE BLACK LIGHT POSTER #3 OF 6 INSIDE!	November 24, 2010
53	A Bump in the Flight	A volatile cargo, a damaged ship, no food or water or means of communication to the outside world, and a renegade group of cannibalistic robots are all part of the Planet Express crew's latest mission. And this time it looks like Professor Farnsworth will be paying his employees in wages of fear!	COLLECTIBLE BLACK LIGHT POSTER #4 OF 6 INSIDE!	January 26, 2011
54	How Much is that Mutant in the Window?	Do androids dream of one-eyed, mutant, space pilots? And after dreaming about them, are they willing to sell those space pilots on the interplanetary black market as pets? And once they sell them, as pets to a distant culture that seeks glory by winning the Westministeria Pet Show, are the space pilots' friends prepared to save said space pilots from being named 'Best of Breed'? Ask no further. All of your silly questions will soon be answered. Also: When Kif Kroker earns a promotion, Zapp Brannigan takes extreme measures to make sure Kif's new command becomes his last patrol![	COLLECTIBLE BLACK LIGHT POSTER #5 OF 6 INSIDE!	March 23, 2011
55	The Trouble with Trilogies	Fearing that the Planet Express ship is about to crash, Fry, Bender, and Leela must each take a one-man escape pod, and they soon find themselves in separate worlds. Fry lands in a dusty, Old Western town under the thumb of a vengeful outlaw; Bender discovers a post-apocalyptic, fuel-deprived society of road warriors; and Leela becomes part of a society of blue-skinned natives who need help protecting their beloved rainforest from a military onslaught.	COLLECTIBLE BLACK LIGHT POSTER #6 OF 6 INSIDE!	May 25, 2011
56	Do You Want Fry With That?	After blowing up the Earth...well, actually an Earth-sized fast food restaurant, Fry is sentenced to work off the damages, only to discover that he has a special talent for worldwide fast food delivery techniques in a story we could only call 'Do You Want Fry with That?	IT'S THE END OF THE WORLD AS WE KNOW IT!	July 27, 2011
57	Steampunk'd	What would have happened if Fry traveled back in time 100 to a sci-fi influenced, industrialized Victorian Age rather than a thousand years into the future?	LET OFF SOME STEAM, PUNKS!	September 28, 2011
58	Boomsday	Professor Farnsworth builds two robot parents for Bender. They immediately start to discipline him, which everyone thinks is for the best. Meanwhile, the Professor finds out someone robbed his Doomsday Device Room.	ANOTHER BONGO HIT!	November 2011
59	How to Secede Without Really Trying	When Mayor Poopenmeyer's reputation is tainted by corruption charges, Bender steps in and rehabilitates his image; but give the bending unit a little power and pretty soon New New York City is seceding from the planet. Then, frustrated by the high cost of eggs, Leela steals a few from some nearby owl nests, only to find herself and Planet Express at the mercy of some very angry birds!		February 1, 2012
60	The Bot Who Cried Wolf	Bender becomes the star of a hit TV show on which he terrifies the public with predictions about the imminent end of the world. Meanwhile, Fry and Leela work off an amusement park debt as carnies on the moon. And when a real threat to Earth appears on the horizon, Bender and the Planet Express crew must warn a wary and weary populace that has braced itself for disaster one too many times.		March 28, 2012
61	Troop Grit	Bender takes charge of a bot scout, but after declaring that membership is for robots only, he is soon challenged by Leela's all-girl, evil mutant troop. Not wanting to be left out, Fry forms a troop of his own, with himself as its only member! When Planet Express sponsors a field trip and delivery competition, Fry, Leela, and Bender set out to prove to each other who has the top troop!		May 30, 2012
62	Lost Our Leela	After being dragged through an asteroid field, Leela is found drifting in space with no memory of who she is—that is until Zapp Brannigan claims her as his bride. Plus, in breaking news, Morbo gets his own back-up feature.		August 1, 2012
63	Igner-ants is Bliss	The Planet Express crew makes a delivery to the robot pleasure planet of Shangri-linux, where the atmosphere is lethal to humans, and so Professor Farnsworth simply transfers both Fry and Leela's consciousness into robots that share their likeness. But everything starts to go awry when Bender realizes the unsuspecting and vacationing robots are being mindwiped and turned into slaves. Is it time for Bender to grow a conscience? Don't bet on it.	IT'S MECHANIZED MAYHEM AS... ROBOTS GO WILD!	October 3, 2012
64	Secret Santa	Professor Farnsworth sends the Planet Express crew to Neptune to shut down Robot Santa's naughty or nice tracking system, which is spreading embarrassing personal information about everyone across the Internet. However, an overload of so much secret information may very well destroy Earth unless Robot Santa can bring a little peace on Earth and goodwill to all men.		November 28, 2012
65	The Sun Also Raises	The stakes have never been higher when the Planet Express crew needs to deliver a check to an alien race to pay the Earth's solar power bill. But it is going to take a little gamesmanship and even more dumb luck to prevent another planetary Ice Age. Fortunately, Bender and Fry have both—in spades.	IT'S ICE COLD WAR. CAN EARTH SURVIVE?	January 30, 2013
66	The Board Game Games	Fry's skill at obsolete 20th-century board games leads to a galaxy-crossing grudge match between the Planet Express crew and an alien culture built entirely on the rules of the games. However, the aliens like their competitions to be less Hungry Hungry Hippos and more Hunger Games! "Do not pass 'Go.' Do not collect $200." Fry, Bender and Leela are about to play the game of Life...and death!		March 27, 2013
67	Tartar House 5	While at a seafood restaurant called The Tartar House, Zoidberg gets unstuck in time, ricocheting from the past to the future, but he's going to need the help of the Planet Express crew in the present to prevent all life on Earth from being destroyed!		May 29, 2013
68	Futuramarutuf	Have you heard of the 24-Hour Comic? Well, that's nothing compared to the Futurama One Hour Comic and it can only be delivered by your friends at Planet Express! Prepare for a Mobius 'comic' strip brought to you from the inventive and slightly addled mind of Professor Hubert J. Farnsworth!		Aug 27, 2013
69	Don't Go Taking My Heart!	After too many years of running MomCorp without a soul, it's finally Mom's heart that is beginning to fail. But what is a multi-millionaire magnate supposed to do when her cryogenically frozen, designated organ donor is defrosted and delivering packages across the galaxy as part of the Planet Express crew?		Oct 23, 2013
70	The Devil and Professor F.	Professor Farnsworth sells his soul to the Robot Devil in order to be young again, foregoing any and all future scientific discoveries. But when the Planet Express crew becomes responsible for a potentially world-ending calamity, the 'old' professor and his scientific genius are needed more than ever! Can the professor break his contract with the Robot Devil and save all of humanity?		Feb 26, 2014
71	Pizza Wars	From the imagination of fan favorite and Futurama follower Jimmy Palmiotti comes a tale that brings Fry back to basics as a pizza delivery guy. In this case, however, the Planet Express crew is making a special delivery from a planet that oozes sauce to a Brooklyn pizzeria. But hold on to your cannoli, the mob wants a piece of the action and (BADA-BING!), the Planet Express crew discovers there's a little special ingredient in their shipment that they never expected!		May 28, 2014
72	Trading Spaces	After Leela saves Zapp Brannigan and his barely covered backside from the gravitational pull of a black hole, she is made captain of the Nimbus, leaving Zapp to fill another void as the new pilot at Planet Express.		September 3, 2014
73	Night of the Automated Dead	If you thought computer viruses were bad, just wait until Planet Express' morally bankrupt bending unit starts spreading a social disease of his own around New New York City, causing a calamitous epidemic of robot zombies!		November 19, 2014
74	What the What If?	When Bender accidentally causes the Professor's What-If Machine to explode, the city of New New York is divided into multiple "What If" scenarios. Only Bender and Fry are unaffected and must gather the parts needed to repair the machine to return things to normal. They enlist the help of a Zoidberg who is from a world where he is incredibly lucky, a Leela who never left the mutant underground and is painfully shy, and a Professor who just happens to be a kangaroo.		February 25, 2015
75	Bendership Galactica	When the Planet Express ship is destroyed while on a mission in space, the crew including Professor Farnsworth, Amy, and Zoidberg must take refuge in a makeshift spaceship... made out of Bender! Trapped in space without a propulsion system and forced to live in close quarters, the crew must survive not only the many computer viruses infecting the robot but something even more deadly... one another!		July 1, 2015
76	Captain Brannigan, The Windbag Soldier			September 2, 2015
77	New New New York			November 18, 2015
78	Little Orphan Android			February 24, 2016
79	Kif of Death!			May 18, 2016
80	Dumbsday!			August 24, 2016
81	A Touch of Medieval!			November 23, 2016
82	Burning Mom			May 20, 2017
83	Bendocchio			September 20, 2017
Annual 1				July 18, 2018

== Specials ==
In 2002, it was announced that a special two-part crossover with the characters of Simpsons Comics would be printed. The mini-series was written by Ian Boothby and pencilled by James Lloyd. It was followed by another special in 2005.

=== Futurama Comics #1 (San Diego Comic-Con Exclusive 2000) ===
A limited-edition variant of Futurama Comics #1, exclusive to San Diego Comic-Con 2000.

=== Futurama/Simpsons Infinitely Secret Crossover Crisis ===
Issue #	Title	Plot summary	Release date	Cover arts
1	Somewhere Over the Brain-Bow!		August 21, 2002	
2	Liquid Diamond Is Forever!		January 28, 2003	

=== The Simpsons/Futurama Crossover Crisis II ===
Issue #	Title	Plot summary	Release date
1	Slaves of New New York!		January 26, 2005
2	The Read Menace!		March 23, 2005

=== Futurama Returns (San Diego Comic-Con 2007 Exclusive) ===
A limited-edition teaser for the direct-to-DVD Futurama movies. A live reading of the comic by most of the original cast was included as an extra on the DVD of Bender's Big Score.

=== Delivery-Boy Man (San Diego Comic-Con 2010 Exclusive) ===
This comic was only available at San Diego Comic-Con 2010. It is based on the comic Fry wrote in the episode "Lrrreconcilable Ndndifferences", which had not aired at the time the comic was released.

=== Futurama Comics to Infinity! (San Diego Comic-Con 2013 Exclusive) ===
A 104-page collection featuring issues 23, 37, 39, and 45.

== Variations ==
Titan Magazines began printing Futurama Comics in the United Kingdom in 2002, with the first issue going on sale on October 3. The UK version is a larger A4 size and there is a sidebar on the front cover previewing what is inside. The same content is featured in these issues as in the United States, but there are also competitions and more "fan art". The order of release is altered from the original line-up; the crossovers were published as part of the main series, pushing some issues back. US issue 7 was published as UK issue 6 to coincide with the release of Terminator 3: Rise of the Machines. Captions are also changed as well, with the aforementioned issue changed to "Rise of the Machines!" and issue 3 reading "New Version 5.0!" on account of it being printed two issues later. "DOOP the Right Thing" was not published until issue 9.

Until issue 14, the comics were published bi-monthly. From issue 15 until issue 44 they were published monthly and, to avoid catching up with the US issues (which were by now quarterly), the issues were then split in two, though "Bender Breaks Out" was published as a full issue as otherwise the story does not make sense. From issue 45 onwards the comics are reverting to bi-monthly.
Special promotional editions are also published; a miniature edition of "DOOP the Right Thing" was included with an issue of the UK Simpsons Comics.

Titan ceased publishing Futurama Comics in the UK with the release of issue 67 (US issues 67 and 68) in August, 2013.

The comic began publishing in Australia in 2002 and follows the same release pattern as the US. However, until issue 16, they were published quarterly, going bi-monthly in late 2005. There are variations in the captions used; "A Fit Worse Than Death" was originally printed without one, with the Australian publishers adding "Medicine In The 31st Century".

== Trade paperbacks ==
- Futurama-O-Rama: Collects Issues #1-4 (November 2002)
- Futurama Adventures: Collects Issues #5-9 (September 2004)
- The Time Bender Trilogy: Collects Issues #16-19 (July 2006)
- Futurama Conquers The Universe: Collects Issues #10-13 (October 2007)
- The Simpsons / Futurama Crossover Crisis: Collects Futurama/Simpsons Infinitely Secret Crossover Crisis #1-2, Simpsons/Futurama Crossover Crisis II #1-2, excerpts from Simpsons Comics #87 and Simpsons Summer Shindig #2, and a reprint of Simpsons Comics #1 (March 2010)
