= Golden Apple Comics =

Comic book store

Golden Apple Comics, Hollywood

Golden Apple Comics is a comic book store in Hollywood, Los Angeles, California.

== History ==
The store's original owners, Bill Liebowitz and Thom Smitham, opened Golden Apple Comics on Melrose Avenue in Los Angeles in 1979. The original inventory of the store consisted of Thom's comic book and comic art collection and bags from the prior company that had occupied the building, a business called Golden Apple: thus, Golden Apple Comics was born. Bill was a yo-yo champion in the 1950s, a co-founder of Rhino Records, and had recurring roles as himself in Archie Comics. After Bill purchased Thom's share of the business, he opened a second location in Northridge in 1983. Liebowitz was well known for hosting signings by comic book artists and writers, as well as for his anti-censorship activism.

After Liebowitz' death in 2004, his widow Sharon and son Ryan took over the business and continue to run the store.

In April 2009 the Northridge store was sold to Earth 2 Comics, and became their second location.

== Public image ==
The shop has been featured in many film projects, including "Weird Al" Yankovic's "White & Nerdy" video and—perhaps most prominently—in the movie Free Enterprise (1998) in which Sharon Liebowitz played herself. Blair Butler, G4TV's resident comic expert, often hosts her segment of Attack of the Show, called "Fresh Ink", at the Golden Apple. It was also featured in an episode of the short-lived NBC crime drama Raines, in which an up-and-coming comic artist who frequented Golden Apple Comics was murdered.

Golden Apple regularly hosts celebrity guests such as Stan Lee before his death, Frank Miller, Marc Silvestri and George A. Romero, and has been frequented by famous patrons such as Michael Jackson and Michael Boatman. DC Comics vice president Bob Wayne called Golden Apple Comics "one of the most important comic book stores in the world".
