= Bongo Comics =

Defunct American comic book publisher

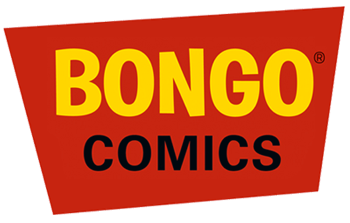
- Founded: 1993; 33 years ago
- Founder: Matt Groening, Steve Vance, Cindy Vance, Bill Morrison
- Defunct: 2018; 8 years ago
- Country of origin: United States
- Headquarters location: Santa Monica, California
- Distribution: United States, Canada, United Kingdom, Australia, South Africa
- Key people: Nathan Kane, creative director Matt Groening, publisher
- Publication types: Comics
- Fiction genres: Comedy
- Official website: www.bongocomics.com

Bongo Comics Group was a comic book publishing company founded in 1993 by Matt Groening along with Steve & Cindy Vance and Bill Morrison. It published comics related to the animated television series The Simpsons and Futurama, as well as the SpongeBob SquarePants comics, along with original material. The company was named after Bongo, a rabbit character in Groening's comic strip Life in Hell.

Bongo, at some time in its history, printed Simpsons Comics, Simpsons Comics and Stories, Futurama Comics, Krusty Comics, Lisa Comics, Bart Simpson, Bartman, Itchy & Scratchy Comics and Radioactive Man.

Zongo Comics, also created by Groening, was Bongo Comics' counterpart geared towards mature audiences.

== History ==
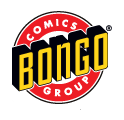
The original Bongo Comics logo.

Groening launched Bongo Comics Group in 1993, perceiving a lack of funny books in the comic book industry at the time: "I go into comic book stores and look at all the stuff, and, for the most part, it looks like fairly grim science-fiction and superhero stuff ... I guess I just thought there was room out there for funny comic books." The company launched four titles, the bi-monthly Simpsons Comics and Radioactive Man Vol. 1, and the thrice-annually Itchy & Scratchy Comics and Bartman. Groening hoped that the new company would revitalise the industry, and held discussions to publish cross-overs with characters from other publishing companies. The comics use original story-lines rather than simply adapting episodes of the television series; however, in 2011 editor Bill Morrison explained that the stories "fit in with the continuity of the shows."

The company launched Futurama Comics, based on the cartoon series of the same name, in 2000.

2012 saw the company change their logo, and a new creative director was unveiled, with Nathan Kane promoted internally to replace the departing Bill Morrison.

It was announced at San Diego Comic-Con in July 2018 that Bongo would be shutting down in October. Simpsons Comics #245 was the final issue released by Bongo.

== All series ==
- Simpsons Comics (1993–2018) 245 Issues
- Bartman v1 (1993–1995) 6 Issues
- Bartman v2 (2017) 3 issues (cover titled Bartman: Spectacularly Super Secret Saga)
- Itchy & Scratchy Comics (1993–1994) 4 Issues
- Radioactive Man Vol. 1 (1993–1994) 6 Issues
- Krusty Comics (1995) 3 Issues
- Bart Simpson's Treehouse of Horror (1995–2017) 23 Issues
- Roswell, Little Green Man (1996–1999) 6 Issues
- Hopster's Tracks (1998-2000) 2 Issues
- Bart Simpson (2000–2016) 100 Issues
- Futurama Comics (2000–2017) 83 Issues
- Radioactive Man Vol. 2 (2000–2004) 9 Issues
- Futurama Simpsons Infinitely Secret Crossover Crisis (2002–2003) 2 Issues
- The Simpsons Futurama Crossover Crisis II (2005) 2 Issues
- Heroes Anonymous (2003–2006) 6 Issues
- Simpsons Classics (2004–2011) 30 Issues
- Simpsons Super Spectacular (2005–2012) 16 Issues
- Bongo Comics Free-For-All (2006-2018) 13 Issues.
- The Simpsons Winter Wingding (2006–2015) 10 Issues
- The Simpsons Summer Shindig (2007–2015) 9 Issues
- Comic Book Guy: The Comic Book (2010) 5 Issues
- SpongeBob Comics (2011–2018) 85 Issues (distribution, published by United Plankton Pictures)
- SpongeBob Comics Annual-Size Super-Giant Swimtacular (2013–2018) 6 Issues (distribution, published by United Plankton Pictures)
- Sergio Aragonés Funnies (2011–2014) 12 Issues
- Simpsons Illustrated (2012–2017) 28 Issues
- Simpsons One-Shot Wonders (2012–2018) 18 Issues
- Mylo Xyloto (2012) 6 Issues

== Single issue publications ==
- Bongo Comics Group Spectacular (1993)
- Simpsons Comics and Stories (1993)
- The Official History of Bongo Comics (Fall 1993)
- Bartman and Radioactive Man #1 (1994)
- Lisa Comics (April 1995)
- Bart Simpson's Joke Book (June 1995)
- Futurama Comics#1 (July 2000) A 2000 San Diego Comic-Con variant of Futurama Comics #1.
- Free Comic Book Day: Gimme! Gimme! Giveaway! (2005)
- Radioactive Man #711 (July 2007) Promotional comic available only at 7-Eleven.
- San Diego Comic-Con exclusives:
  - Futurama Returns (July 2007)
  - Delivery-Boy Man (July 2010)
  - The Simpsons Best Superhero Stories Ever! The Collector's Edition (July 2011)
  - The Simpsons Go for the Gold (July 2012)
  - Two One-Shot Wonders in One (July 2013): contains The Malevolent Mr. Burns and Professor Frink's Fantastic Science Fictions.
  - The Greatest Bartman Stories Ever Told! (July 2014): contains an assortment of previously published Bartman stories.
- One-Shot Wonder series:
  1. Ralph Wiggum Comics (February 2012)
  2. Bart Simpson's Pal, Milhouse (April 2012)
  3. Li'l Homer Comics (August 2012)
  4. Maggie (October 2012)
  5. Professor Frink's Fantastic Science Fictions (February 2013)
  6. The Malevolent Mr. Burns (June 2013)
  7. The Wonderful World of Lisa Simpson (December 2013)
  8. Duffman Adventures (April 2014)
  9. Kang & Kodos (August 2014)
  10. McBain (December 2014)
  11. Jimbo Jones (September 2015)
  12. Grampa Simpson's Adventure (December 2015)
  13. Krusty the Clown (April 2017) First released digitally through the Simpsons Store app. A print version was released in February 2018.
  14. The Mighty Moe Szyslak (June 2017)
  15. Chief Wiggum's Felonious Funnies (March 2018)
