= Bart's Dog Gets an "F" =

"Bart's Dog Gets an 'F'"
- The Simpsons episode
- Episode no.: Season 2 Episode 16
- Directed by: Jim Reardon
- Written by: Jon Vitti
- Production code: 7F14
- Original air date: March 7, 1991

Guest appearances
- Tracey Ullman as Emily Winthrop and Sylvia Winfield; Frank Welker as animal voices

Episode features
- Chalkboard gag: "I will not sell school property" (recycled from "Bart Gets Hit by a Car")
- Couch gag: The Simpsons sit on the couch with Santa's Little Helper and Snowball II.
- Commentary: Matt Groening; Jon Vitti; Al Jean; Jim Reardon

Episode chronology
← Previous "Oh Brother, Where Art Thou?"	Next → "Old Money"
- The Simpsons season 2

"Bart's Dog Gets an 'F'" is the sixteenth episode of the second season of the American animated television series The Simpsons. It originally aired on Fox in the United States on March 7, 1991. In this episode, the Simpson family's dog, Santa's Little Helper, infuriates Homer and Marge by destroying a family heirloom and an expensive pair of shoes. When Marge and Homer want to get rid of the dog, Bart enrolls him at an obedience school to curb his bad behavior.

"Bart's Dog Gets an 'F'" was written by Jon Vitti and directed by Jim Reardon. Tracey Ullman guest starred as Emily Winthrop, the obedience school instructor; she also voiced Sylvia Winfield, the Simpsons' neighbor. The animal noises for the episode were performed by Frank Welker. "Bart's Dog Gets an 'F'" features cultural references to films such as Predator, Jaws, E.T. the Extra-Terrestrial, and National Lampoon's Animal House, and is named in reference to the previous episode "Bart Gets an 'F'".

Since airing, the episode has received mostly positive reviews from television critics. It acquired a Nielsen rating of 13.8 and was the highest-rated show on Fox the week it aired.

== Plot ==
Lisa is home from school with the mumps, so Marge teaches her to sew. While Homer is at the mall buying magazines for Lisa, he splurges on a $125 pair of Assassins athletic shoes after seeing Ned sporting them. Santa's Little Helper promptly destroys Homer's Assassins. Marge shows Lisa a patchwork quilt, a family heirloom, which Santa's Little Helper chews apart. When Homer and Marge want to get rid of the dog, Bart and Lisa promise to train him, if they are allowed to keep him.

Santa's Little Helper attends an obedience school run by Emily Winthrop, an English woman. After seeing how misbehaved the dog is, she sternly suggests Bart use a choke chain to correct his behavior. Since Bart is reluctant to use firm discipline to train him, the dog fails to master basic commands like sitting and heeling. Emily grows more exasperated with Bart and his dog at each class.

Thinking it will be their last time together, Bart plays with Santa's Little Helper the night before the final exam. The dog is finally able to understand Bart's commands and passes obedience school, to Homer's chagrin. Lisa marks the occasion by starting a new quilt to replace the one Santa's Little Helper destroyed.

== Production ==
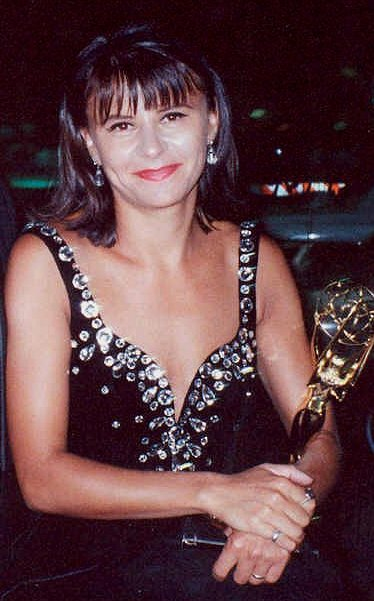
Guest star Tracey Ullman

This episode was written by Jon Vitti and directed by Jim Reardon. Tracey Ullman guest starred as Emily Winthrop, the instructor at the obedience school, whose mannerisms parody Margaret Thatcher. The Simpsons began as a series of one-minute shorts created by Matt Groening for Ullman's variety show, The Tracey Ullman Show, for three seasons during 1987–89. Due to the success of the shorts, the characters spun off into their own half-hour prime-time show on Fox. Groening wanted Ullman to make a guest appearance in one of the shorts, but was told that she was too busy with the rest of The Tracey Ullman Show. When her show was canceled in 1990, Ullman agreed to do a guest appearance on The Simpsons after being asked by Groening again. The animal noises for the episode, including those by Santa's Little Helper, were performed by Frank Welker. It was the first The Simpsons episode Welker worked on and he became a recurring voice actor on the show, before leaving in 2002.

== Cultural references ==
Dr. Hibbert's home and family resemble those of The Cosby Show, a program that at the time competed with The Simpsons for the Thursday 8:00 p.m. time slot. The high tech and expensive sneakers are a reference to Nike Air Jordans, which sell on the basis of brand loyalty and celebrity endorsements. When Lisa shows Marge her sewing finger, music from E.T. the Extra-Terrestrial plays; Lisa's touching Marge's finger refers to the film's final scene. The second frame in the Bouvier family patchwork quilt depicts a poster for one of Buffalo Bill's Wild West shows; the photograph The Falling Soldier by Robert Capa is the third frame in the quilt. When the scene changes to Santa's Little Helper's point of view, a small explosion sound is heard; this sound is used in the film Predator, when the camera switches to Predator's point of view. The dramatic music from Jaws is used just before Santa's Little Helper attacks something. The dog obedience school has different categories named after famous dogs: Rin Tin Tin, Benji, Toto and the one which Santa's Little Helper attends, Cujo. Winthrop is based on British dog trainer and author Barbara Woodhouse. Winthrop exclaims "Heavens to Murgatroyd!", a catchphrase spoken by Bert Lahr in Meet the People and popularised by the cartoon character Snagglepuss. One of the dogs seen in the graduation ceremony is named after Lao Tzu, an ancient philosopher of China. At the end of the episode, the eventual fate of the various dogs in the class are captioned at the bottom of the screen, a reference to the ending of the film National Lampoon's Animal House.

== Reception ==
In its original broadcast, "Bart's Dog Gets an 'F'" finished thirtieth in the ratings for the week of March 4–10, 1991, with a Nielsen rating of 13.8, equivalent to approximately thirteen million viewing households. It was the highest-rated show on Fox that week.

Since airing, the episode has received mostly positive reviews from television critics. The authors of the book I Can't Believe It's a Bigger and Better Updated Unofficial Simpsons Guide, Gary Russell and Gareth Roberts, wrote that it was an "enjoyable episode heightened by both Tracey Ullman's Miss Winthropp and Frank Welker's muted dog noises". DVD Movie Guide's Colin Jacobson said the episode "presented an odd viewpoint, since [Santa's Little Helper] never behaved this badly in prior episodes, but consistency never exactly was the hallmark of the series". He also commented that Tracey Ullman "offered a great performance as obedience school owner Emily Winthrop", and concluded by saying the episode overall "provided yet another consistently fine show".

In a review of the second season, Bryce Wilson of Cinema Blend thought "Bart's Dog Gets an 'F'" felt "a bit flat", but "even in [its] lowest points, humor is easy to find". Doug Pratt, a DVD reviewer and Rolling Stone contributor, was also positive about the episode: "The viewer is treated to an inspired dog's prospective of the world, in very grayish tones, with the humans speaking gibberish; another poignant character effort." Jacobson's favorite line of the episode was Homer's ad about Santa's Little Helper: "Free to loving home. World's most brilliant dog. Says 'I love you' on command."

Reviewing for The DVD Journal, Dawn Taylor thought the most memorable line was Flanders's description of the Assassins sneakers: "They've got Velcro straps, a water pump in the tongue, a built-in pedometer, reflective sidewalls and little vanity plates." In promotion of The Simpsons Sing the Blues, the music video for the album's second single, "Deep, Deep Trouble" premiered shortly after this episode's first broadcast.
