= Two Dozen and One Greyhounds =

- The Simpsons episode
- Episode no.: Season 6 Episode 20
- Directed by: Bob Anderson
- Written by: Mike Scully
- Production code: 2F18
- Original air date: April 9, 1995

Guest appearances
- Frank Welker as Santa's Little Helper, She's The Fastest, and the puppies

Episode features
- Chalkboard gag: "The Good Humor man can only be pushed so far"
- Couch gag: The family chases after the couch and the back wall as it slides down an endless hallway.
- Commentary: Matt Groening; David Mirkin; Mike Scully; Bob Anderson

Episode chronology
← Previous "Lisa's Wedding"	Next → "The PTA Disbands"
- The Simpsons season 6

"Two Dozen and One Greyhounds" is the twentieth episode of the sixth season of the American animated television series The Simpsons. It originally aired on Fox in the United States on April 9, 1995. The episode was written by Mike Scully and directed by Bob Anderson. Frank Welker guest stars as Santa's Little Helper and various other dogs. In the episode, Santa's Little Helper has puppies with a dog that he met at the greyhound racetrack, who Mr. Burns adopts.

The episode is a parody of Walt Disney Pictures' 1961 animated film One Hundred and One Dalmatians. The producers decided to have Mr. Burns communicate his horrific plan of making a tuxedo from the puppies through a musical number, "See My Vest" (a parody of "Be Our Guest" from the 1991 Disney film Beauty and the Beast), after determining that it would be a "fun and light" way to convey his plan of killing the greyhounds. "Two Dozen and One Greyhounds" received a generally positive reception from television critics. During the week of its original broadcast, the episode finished 55th in ratings, with a Nielsen rating of 7.3. Several reviews considered the episode to be among the best in the series, with Mr. Burns' role and the "See My Vest" sequence being singled out for praise.

== Plot ==
The Simpson family's dog, Santa's Little Helper, runs away from home to the dog racing track, where he mates with a female greyhound named She's The Fastest. She gives birth to a litter of 25 puppies after her owner, the Rich Texan, gives her to the Simpsons. They quickly become too difficult to manage, so Homer and Marge try giving them away. Though several of the citizens are willing to adopt the puppies, they are unable to do so as the puppies do not like being separated, so Mr. Burns offers to take them all. Fearing he will mistreat them, Lisa persuades her parents to refuse Burns' offer, but he and Smithers secretly steal the puppies.

After Chief Wiggum casually remarks that Burns has the puppies, Bart and Lisa sneak into Burns Manor. They are surprised to see him bathing and doting on the dogs. One of them stands up on its hind legs, reminding Burns of actor Rory Calhoun; he names this one "Little Monty." Bart and Lisa learn that he plans to kill the other 24 puppies and make a tuxedo from their pelts when he performs a song, using his wardrobe of macabre clothing fashioned from animal hides to make several costume changes.

Bart and Lisa slip inside the mansion to retrieve the litter. The children and puppies slide down a laundry chute to the basement, where Burns and Smithers are waiting for them. To trick Burns into freeing the puppies, Bart mixes them up so that he cannot tell which one is Little Monty. After Little Monty stands on Burns' command, Bart reels a clothesline so that socks dangle overhead to get all the puppies to stand. Burns briefly considers killing all the puppies and the children, but cannot bring himself to do it since they all remind him of Calhoun. The Simpsons then let Burns keep the puppies, who grow to become world champion racing dogs and earn him millions of dollars in prize money. Marge visits the basement to find a depressed Homer having apparently hanged himself, only for it to be revealed that Homer is clinging to a roof beam, batting the lightbulb in an effort to cheer himself up.

== Production ==
=== Inspiration, writing, and music ===
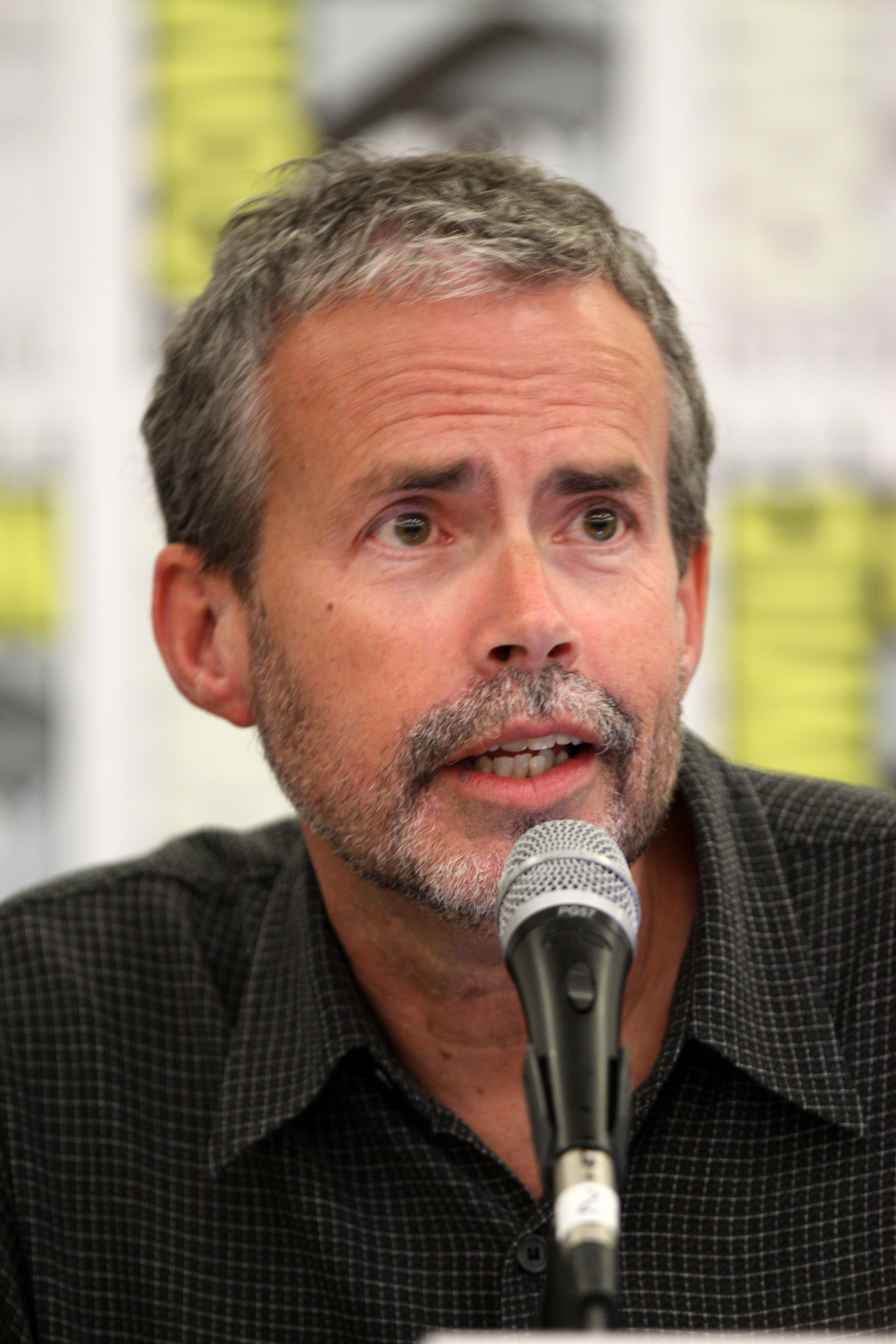
The episode was written by Mike Scully, but Al Jean and Mike Reiss came up with the original idea for it.

"Two Dozen and One Greyhounds" was written by Mike Scully and directed by Bob Anderson. The Simpsons writers Al Jean and Mike Reiss came up with the original idea for the episode. The idea came to them after watching the 1961 Disney film One Hundred and One Dalmatians. David Mirkin, the episode's show runner, later jokingly said that Jean and Reiss liked to steal ideas from Disney, and pointed to an episode in season eight that they wrote as proof, titled "Simpsoncalifragilisticexpiala(Annoyed Grunt)cious", which was based on the 1964 Disney film Mary Poppins. Mirkin thought that it was great that they could take stuff from Disney and do darker versions on The Simpsons "in a completely legal way".

Matt Groening was happy with the episode because he thought it felt like a callback to the first episode of The Simpsons, "Simpsons Roasting on an Open Fire", and because it features references to One Hundred and One Dalmatians. The Disney film thrilled Groening as a child, and was one of the reasons he was first interested in animation and cartooning. In One Hundred and One Dalmatians, the puppies watch cartoons on television several times; the idea of a cartoon within a cartoon thrilled Groening, and said that this idea inspired him to create The Itchy & Scratchy Show, a fictional television show within the Simpsons universe.

Mr. Burns says in the episode that the puppy that stands up only on its hind legs reminds him of Rory Calhoun, an American actor who lived from 1922 to 1999. The Simpsons writer George Meyer came up with the joke, but Groening argued against it because he did not think the audience would know who Calhoun was. The writers decided to keep it in anyway, because it was later expanded into a key part of the episode's ending. Several years later, Groening stated that he was proven correct after pointing to discussions on the Internet about the episode asking who Calhoun was.

As Bart and Lisa sneak away to Mr. Burns' mansion, they see him loading a gun and singing a musical number called "See My Vest", in which he proclaims his intention to kill the puppies to make a tuxedo out of them. When the staff discussed how they could gloss over the horrifying things Mr. Burns would do to the dogs, one of the writers suggested that if they communicated his plan through a song, it would stay "fun and light". Scully liked the idea and returned the following day with a complete set of lyrics for "See My Vest", which was a parody of the song "Be Our Guest", sung by Jerry Orbach in the 1991 film Beauty and the Beast. Mirkin loved Scully's lyrics, commenting, "The rhymes are really clever. It's one of our very best songs [on The Simpsons]." He also liked the fact that songs could be used in episodes of The Simpsons without the episodes turning into musicals, saying, "We'll just do one song and that's plenty. We have fun with that and then we're out."

=== Animation and voice acting ===
Even though animals in cartoons often behave with "semi-human awareness", Groening said he preferred animals in cartoons to behave exactly the way they do in real life, claiming that this was how animals were depicted in "Two Dozen and One Greyhounds". Mirkin said there were some exceptions for gags, but most of the time they tried to keep the animals acting realistically. The animal noises for the episode were provided by Frank Welker, whose performances were praised by Mirkin on the DVD audio commentary for the episode, saying, "He can do anything, and it fits perfectly. You forget you're listening to a guy, and he's a pleasure to work with." Welker was also praised by Groening, who said Welker was unbelievably good at doing animal noises.

The staff had a "big fight" with the Fox network censors over the scene in which Santa's Little Helper mates with She's The Fastest. The writers were originally worried about the idea, but Mirkin knew that they could show the dogs having sex in a manner that was not explicit. In the scene's final version, the dogs are only seen from the shoulders up; the crew's animatic showing the scene in full was later released on DVD. Anderson noted that during the episode's censor screening, there was a giant laugh at the depiction.

== Cultural references ==
The overarching plot of the episode and its title are inspired by the Walt Disney film One Hundred and One Dalmatians. In a reference to the film itself, the greyhounds are shown watching television in one scene. The program they are watching is Models, Inc. Mr. Burns' song "See My Vest" is a parody of "Be Our Guest" from Beauty and the Beast. The scene in which Santa's Little Helper and She's The Fastest are presented with a plate of spaghetti at Luigi's Italian restaurant parodies Lady and the Tramp. Santa's Little Helper digs up Lisa’s bongos, Bart’s strobe light and Homer’s Best of Ray Stevens Featuring The Streak. Homer: “So it was the dog that buried all our stuff!” “Yes…the dog,” Marge replies.

The clerk performing a mind-meld on Santa's Little Helper is a reference to the Vulcan mind-meld ability in Star Trek; the same music from the mind-meld scenes in Star Trek are played during the scene. At one point, Santa's Little Helper looks wistfully out the window of the Simpson family's car, and then morphs out of the car window in reference to a similar scene in Terminator 2: Judgment Day; music from that film plays in the background. Four of the puppies are named Jay, David, Paul, and Branford, a reference to late-night talkshow hosts David Letterman and Jay Leno and their respective bandleaders Paul Shaffer and Branford Marsalis. The puppies "Prince" and "The Puppy Formerly Known as Prince" are references to Prince and his name change in 1993.

== Reception ==
=== Critical reception ===
The song "See My Vest" from the episode, sung by Mr. Burns, was later released on the album Songs in the Key of Springfield in 1997. The Daily Bruin complimented the song's lyrics as witty, and claimed that by listening to the song, memories of the episode came to mind. They noted how the musical piece revealed Mr. Burns' essence of character, and that it also commented on some disturbing elements of humankind. MSNBC compiled a list of "TV’s top 10 scariest characters", placing Mr. Burns at number one. In the list, they noted, "Burns is terrifying because he will do absolutely anything, and since it's a cartoon, he just might", pointing to "Two Dozen and One Greyhounds" and his plans to make the puppies into a tuxedo as proof.

In a review by the Toronto Star, Ben Rayner commented that "Two Dozen and One Greyhounds" was one of his favorite episodes of the series, and concluded that Mr. Burns' "tour de force" performance was particularly captivating. The Toronto Star later produced a list of the best and worst The Simpsons episodes, in which they considered "Two Dozen and One Greyhounds" one of the best episodes of the series and concluded that the musical number was one of the best scenes involving Mr. Burns. In a review for the sixth season DVD of The Simpsons, IGN's Todd Gilchrist found Mr. Burns' performance to be memorable, commenting that he "flirts with copyright infringement with his rendition of 'See My Vest'". IGN also considered Burns' performance to have reached a level of excellence comparable to "The Monorail Song" in "Marge vs. the Monorail".

In a review for The Simpsons season six DVD, review website DVD Verdict gave the episode a grade of B−. DVD Movie Guide's Colin Jacobson appreciated the spoofs of Disney films, and also complimented "the most bizarre references to Rory Calhoun imaginable", concluding that the combination of these elements formed a "fine show".

David Sims writes “every time I get ready to review a Simpsons episode, I tell my friends which one is up next and see which line they immediately recite. By far the most popular quotation from Two Dozen And One Greyhounds' is “Look at you, standing there on your hind legs like a couple of Rory Calhouns,” which Burns says to the kids when he decides not to kill them. I am sure no one in my generation knows who Rory Calhoun is. I barely know who he is. But the obscurity of the reference is what makes it so memorable, I think). ... 'Two Dozen And One Greyhounds, even with its creepy fur-harvesting twist, is a very straightforward episode that moves at a delightful clip, and it’s fondly remembered for the way it uses Burns’ evilness to drive a breezy little caper.”

=== Ratings ===
In its original broadcast, "Two Dozen and One Greyhounds" finished 55th in ratings for the week of April 3–9, 1995, with a Nielsen rating of 7.3.
