= Do the Bartman =

1990 single by The Simpsons

- Artwork for commercial European releases

Single by The Simpsons

from the album The Simpsons Sing the Blues
- B-side: "Sibling Rivalry"
- Released: November 20, 1990
- Recorded: September 1990
- Studio: Record One (Los Angeles)
- Genre: R&B; new jack swing; hip-hop; novelty
- Length: 5:10 (album version); 3:59 (single version and video edit)
- Label: Geffen
- Songwriters: Bryan Loren; Michael Jackson (uncredited)
- Producers: Bryan Loren; Michael Jackson (uncredited)

The Simpsons singles chronology
"Do the Bartman" (1990)	"Deep, Deep Trouble" (1991)

Michael Jackson singles chronology
"Liberian Girl" (1989)	"Do the Bartman" (1990)	"Black or White" (1991)

"Do the Bartman" is a song from the 1990 album The Simpsons Sing the Blues, featuring the voice cast of the American animated television series The Simpsons. It was performed by The Simpsons cast member Nancy Cartwright (the voice of Bart Simpson), with backing vocals from American singer Michael Jackson, alongside additional vocals from Dan Castellaneta (voice of Homer Simpson). Jackson also produced the song, which was written by American recording artist Bryan Loren, and Geffen Records released it as a single on November 20, 1990.

Despite receiving much radio airplay in the United States, reaching number 22 on Billboard's Hot 100 Airplay chart, "Do the Bartman" was never officially released as a single there. It topped the charts in Australia, Ireland, Luxembourg, New Zealand, Norway, and the United Kingdom. The song additionally reached the top 10 in Belgium, Denmark, Finland, the Netherlands, Spain, and Sweden. A music video, directed by Brad Bird, was released for the song in 1991. The video became a hit on the American network MTV, and received a nomination at the 1991 MTV Video Music Awards.

== Michael Jackson's involvement ==
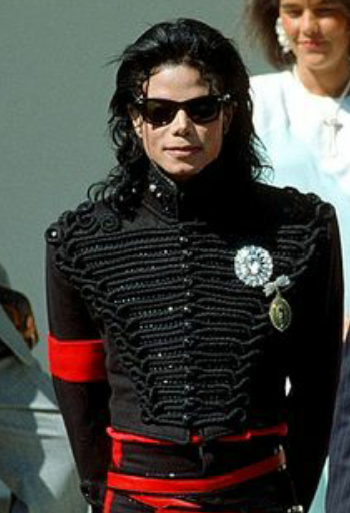
Michael Jackson provided backing vocals for "Do the Bartman".

The album The Simpsons Sing the Blues was released in December 1990. The first single from it was the rap song "Do the Bartman", performed by Bart Simpson's voice actor Nancy Cartwright and released on November 20, 1990. Rumors began spreading in the summer of 1990 that Michael Jackson would write a song for Bart on the album.

This song was reported early on to be "Do the Bartman", but executive producer James L. Brooks issued a press release in September 1990 apologizing for the misunderstanding and stating that song was actually written by one of Jackson's friends, Bryan Loren.

However, by the middle of the decade The Simpsons creator Matt Groening was routinely giving interviews crediting Jackson with the song. In an August 1996 interview with Loaded he stated: "[Jackson] also anonymously wrote the 'Do The Bartman' single and I'm still stunned that no one figured it out, especially when the lyrics had 'I wanna be bad like Michael Jackson'! It's never been picked up by anyone in all this time... until I just told you!"

Groening also later stated during an appearance at the February 1998 World Animation Celebration convention in Pasadena, California that "Do the Bartman" was actually co-written and co-produced by Jackson, but he could not receive credit for it because he was under contract to Epic Records. Groening told a crowd at the convention that had gathered for a "The Simpsons tribute" that it had "always [been] amazing to me that no one ever found out that Michael Jackson wrote that song. [...] He was a big fan of the show."

Jackson was a fan of The Simpsons, especially Bart, and had called the producers one night offering to write Bart a number one single and do a guest spot on the show, which is how "Do the Bartman" came about. Jackson eventually guest-starred in the episode "Stark Raving Dad" (season three, 1991) under the pseudonym John Jay Smith.

He also wrote the song "Happy Birthday Lisa" for the episode "Stark Raving Dad", which was later included in the album Songs in the Key of Springfield. Bryan Loren has stated that Jackson had provided background vocals for "Do the Bartman".

In July 2015, when Bryan Loren was selling the publishing and songwriting rights for the song, Loren stated that "despite Matt Groening's repeated confessions, I am the sole writer of the song". Loren stated that Jackson's contributions included backup vocals and providing the title "Do the Bartman" and that Jackson insisted his own name be mentioned in the lyrics.

== Critical reception ==
Critical reviews of "Do the Bartman" were mostly positive. Larry Flick from Billboard magazine said the single "seems like a logical extension of the public's love affair with Fox TV's popular cartoon characters. This cute and amusing pop/new jack novelty doesn't actually teach any new dance steps, but that hasn't kept radio from jumping on it out of the box." Monika Bartyzel of Cinematical, however, thought the song was a "cheesy number". The Daily Vault's Benny Balneg liked that it disengaged itself from the album's "blues tag" and incorporated more "contemporary elements" into its sound. He added that he thought the song had a "catchy beat" and an "infectious chorus". Ken Tucker of Entertainment Weekly described it as "not bad," and commented that Bart's high voice "echoes the beats nicely". The Long Beach Press-Telegram's Patricia Smith called "Do the Bartman" a "surprisingly funky tune". James Hamilton from Music Week named it Pick of the Week in the category of Dance, adding, "Satellite TV cartoon characters' novelty rap jiggler with Turtles-type kids appeal". David Quantick from NME also felt it's "not bad", adding that the song's "natural vivacity may well make it a hit". A reviewer from People Magazine stated, "Yes, of course the first single, 'Do the Bartman', will be a novelty hit. Written by Bryan Loren, it's a white-bread rap featuring Nancy Cartwright's vocals, reeling off tales of Bart's mischievous ways."

== Chart performance ==
The song topped the charts in Australia, Ireland, Luxembourg, New Zealand, Norway, and the United Kingdom. In the latter country, the song spent three weeks at the top of the UK Singles Chart, and became Britain's seventh best selling song of 1991. "Do the Bartman" has shipped at least 400,000 units in the United Kingdom, and was certified gold by the British Phonographic Industry on February 1, 1991. The song's success in the United Kingdom was remarkable, given that at that time The Simpsons was airing only on British satellite television station Sky One. It would be five years before it first aired on terrestrial television in Britain, airing on BBC One and later BBC Two.

In Ireland, "Do the Bartman" spent nine weeks at number one on the Irish Singles Chart from January 24, 1991, to March 24, 1991. Only nine singles have ever managed a longer run at number one in that country. The song also charted at number one on New Zealand's RIANZ Singles Chart on the issue date of January 25, 1991, and peaked at number one on the chart again, for a total of two weeks, from February 8, 1991, to February 15, 1991.

In March 1991, "Do the Bartman" became the first single to reach number one in Australia that was not available on 7-inch vinyl.

== Music video ==
The accompanying music video for "Do the Bartman" features the typical plot of Bart rebelling against authority when he decides to put his own spin on a rigidly choreographed dance presentation at Springfield Elementary School. The music video for "Do the Bartman" was directed by Brad Bird, with dance choreography by Michael Chambers. Nobody from the staff of The Simpsons wanted to direct it because they were busy doing the show, but Bird finally agreed to do it after having been asked four times. He had a very short amount of time to finish the video because it was supposed to coincide with the release of The Simpsons Sing the Blues.

The entire music video was storyboarded in only two days in the United States. Bird then got on a plane to Budapest, Hungary, where the video was animated by Varga Studio. They thought the video was going to be animated as simply as the original The Simpsons shorts, shown on The Tracey Ullman Show, so when Bird told them that it was going to be done in full animation with no repeated scenes, they "went into deep shock".

The animators added the wraparound at the beginning to set Bart against the crowd and put the video in "some sort of context".

The video was nominated for Best Special Effects at the 1991 MTV Video Music Awards. It originally premiered on Fox after the episode "Bart the Daredevil" on December 6, 1990, and was the number one music video on rotation on MTV between January and March 1991. Along with the music video for "Deep, Deep Trouble", the video was included on The Simpsons: The Complete Second Season DVD boxset in 2002. Following the death of Michael Jackson on June 25, 2009, the music video was broadcast by Fox on June 28, 2009—ahead of a rerun of the episode "Wedding for Disaster"—and featured a title card paying tribute to Jackson.

There is an alternative version of the music video that removes the references to Michael Jackson's "hair strand" (by not including said hair strand in frame), people dancing to the Bartman on a cruise ship with the Statue of Liberty and Twin Towers in the background moving side to side with the rhythm of the song, people dancing to the song in Paris, and East Germans dancing to the song while walking through a demolished section of the recently decommissioned Berlin Wall; replacing it with extra frames of the Springfield "cool kids" dancing along. The alternative version also removes the lyric, "She can do it, you can do it, so can I". While little information is available, these scenes were most likely removed for release on the 2002 DVD boxset due to the 9/11 attacks, controversies surrounding Michael Jackson, and the Berlin Wall reference making the video feel dated.

== Track listings ==
- 7-inch single:
1. "Do the Bartman" (7" House Mix/Edit) – 3:54
2. "Do the Bartman" (LP edit) – 3:59
- CD single:
1. "Do the Bartman" (7" House Mix/Edit) – 3:54
2. "Do the Bartman" (LP edit) – 3:59
3. "Do the Bartman" (Bad Bart House Mix) – 4:49
4. "Do the Bartman" (a cappella) – 3:44
- Digital download:
1. "Do the Bartman" (Diplo's Bartman So So Krispy Remix) – 4:27
- Streaming:
1. "Do the Bartman" (7" House Mix/Edit) – 3:54
2. "Do the Bartman" (LP edit) – 3:59
3. "Do the Bartman" (Bad Bart House Mix) – 4:49
4. "Do the Bartman" (Swingin' in the House Mix) – 8:37
5. "Do the Bartman" - 5:12
6. "Do the Bartman" (a cappella) – 3:44

== Personnel ==
- Nancy Cartwright – lead vocals
- Michael Jackson – backing vocals
- Dan Castellaneta, Julie Kavner, Yeardley Smith, and Matt Groening – additional voices
- Bryan Loren – backing vocals, instruments
- Paul Jackson Jr. – additional guitar
- Laurie Rox, Bart Stevens, and Richard Voltrop – background shouting

=== Production ===
- Richard Cottrell – recording engineer
- Bryan Loren & Michael Jackson – producers
- Julie Last & Bart Stevens – assistant recording engineers
- Mixed at Larrabee Sound Studios

== Charts ==
=== Weekly charts ===
Weekly chart performance for "Do the Bartman"
Chart (1990–1991)	Peak position
Australia (ARIA)	1
Austria (Ö3 Austria Top 40)	17
Belgium (Ultratop 50 Flanders)	4
Canada Top Singles (RPM)	14
Denmark (IFPI)	5
Europe (Eurochart Hot 100)	2
Europe (European Hit Radio)	16
Finland (Suomen virallinen lista)	5
Germany (GfK)	5
Ireland (IRMA)	1
Luxembourg (Radio Luxembourg)	1
Netherlands (Dutch Top 40)	2
Netherlands (Single Top 100)	3
New Zealand (Recorded Music NZ)	1
Norway (VG-lista)	1
Spain (AFYVE)	2
Sweden (Sverigetopplistan)	3
Switzerland (Schweizer Hitparade)	12
UK Singles (OCC)	1
UK Airplay (Music Week)	7
UK Dance (Music Week)	28
US Radio Songs (Billboard)	24

=== Year-end charts ===
Year-end chart performance for "Do the Bartman"
Chart (1991)	Position
Australia (ARIA)	11
Belgium (Ultratop)	58
Europe (Eurochart Hot 100)	13
Germany (Media Control)	42
Netherlands (Dutch Top 40)	23
Netherlands (Single Top 100)	24
New Zealand (RIANZ)	10
Sweden (Topplistan)	11
UK Singles (OCC)	5

== Certifications ==
Certifications and sales for "Do the Bartman"
Region	Certification	Certified units/sales
Australia (ARIA)	Gold	35,000^{^}
New Zealand (RMNZ)	Gold	5,000^{*}
Sweden (GLF)	Gold	25,000^{^}
United Kingdom (BPI)	Gold	451,000
^{*} Sales figures based on certification alone.^{^} Shipments figures based on certification alone.

== Release history ==
Release dates and formats for "Do the Bartman"
Region	Date	Format(s)	Label(s)	Ref.
Europe	November 20, 1990	7-inch vinyl	Geffen	
United Kingdom	January 14, 1991	7-inch vinyl; 7-inch picture disc; 12-inch vinyl; CD; cassette	Geffen	
Australia	December 10, 1990	Cassette	Geffen	
Australia	January 21, 1991	12-inch vinyl	Geffen	
Australia	February 11, 1991	CD	Geffen	

== See also ==
- List of number-one singles in Australia during the 1990s
- List of number-one singles of 1991 (Ireland)
- List of number-one singles in 1991 (New Zealand)
- List of number-one hits in Norway
- List of UK Singles Chart number ones of the 1990s
