= Santa's Little Helper =

Fictional dog from The Simpsons franchise

- The Simpsons character
- First appearance: "Simpsons Roasting on an Open Fire"; The Simpsons; December 17, 1989
- Created by: Matt Groening; Mimi Pond
- Designed by: Matt Groening
- Voiced by: Frank Welker (1991–1995); Dan Castellaneta (1995–present); Hank Azaria (Treehouse of Horror XXV)

In-universe information
- Species: Dog (Greyhound)
- Gender: Male
- Title: Suds McDuff
- Family: The Simpsons (owner); She Biscuit (mother)
- Children: 25 puppies (Note: Named Rover I, Fido, Rex I, Spot, Rover II, Fido II, Rex II, Cleo, Dave I, Jay I, Paul I, Branford I, Dave II, Jay II, Paul II, Branford II, Sleepy, Dopey, Grumpy I, Donner, Blitzen, Grumpy II, King, Queenie, Prince, and The Puppy Formerly Known As Prince.) (first litter); 8 puppies (second litter)
- Mates: She's the Fastest; Rosa Barks

Santa's Little Helper is a fictional dog in the American animated television series The Simpsons. He is the pet greyhound of the Simpson family. He was previously voiced by Frank Welker, and is currently voiced by Dan Castellaneta. The dog was introduced in the first episode of the show, the 1989 Christmas special "Simpsons Roasting on an Open Fire", in which his owner abandons him for finishing last in a greyhound race. Homer and Bart Simpson, who are at the race track in hope of winning some money for Christmas presents, see this and decide to adopt the dog.

Santa's Little Helper has since appeared frequently on The Simpsons, and is the center of the plots of several episodes. During the course of the show, he has fathered litters of puppies, passed obedience school, had surgery for bloat, replaced Duffman as the mascot for Duff Beer, and been trained as a police dog at Springfield's Animal Police Academy. Some of the episodes that focus on Santa's Little Helper have been inspired by popular culture or real experiences that staff members of the show have gone through.

Although most cartoon animals are often humanized, Santa's Little Helper generally exhibits canine behavior. Santa's Little Helper has become a popular character following his appearances on The Simpsons. He ranked 27th in Animal Planet's 2003 television special 50 Greatest TV Animals that was based on popularity, name recognition, and the longevity of the shows. He has also been featured in merchandise relating to The Simpsons, such as video games, board games, and comics.

== Role in The Simpsons ==
Santa's Little Helper is a greyhound dog that appears on the animated television sitcom series The Simpsons and is the pet dog of the Simpson family. He can often be seen on the show in minor appearances, although there have been some episodes that feature him heavily, including the first episode of The Simpsons. In that episode, "Simpsons Roasting on an Open Fire" (season one, 1989), Homer discovers that he has no money to buy Christmas presents for the family. Desperate for a miracle, he and Bart go to the greyhound racing track on Christmas Eve in hopes of winning some money. Although Homer has inside information on which dog is the most likely to win, he instead bets on a last-minute entry, Santa's Little Helper, believing the dog's Christmas-inspired name to be a sign. However, the greyhound finishes last. As Homer and Bart leave the track, they watch the dog's owner abandon him for losing the race. Bart pleads with Homer to keep the dog as a pet and he agrees after it affectionately licks him on the cheek. When Bart and Homer return home, Santa's Little Helper is assumed by the rest of the family to be a Christmas present. Years later, the family would find breeder and trainer Les Moore and reunite their pet with his mother She-Biscuit.

In various episodes, Santa's Little Helper can be seen chewing on newspapers and other objects in the Simpsons' household, destroying furniture, and digging holes in the backyard. In "Bart's Dog Gets an "F"" (season two, 1991), he manages to infuriate the entire family by destroying valued items in the home. As a result, Homer and Marge want to get rid of the dog, but Bart and Lisa convince them that he can be trained at an obedience school. Santa's Little Helper does not do well there as Bart is unwilling to use a choke chain suggested by the instructor. The night before the final exam, Bart and Santa's Little Helper play, thinking it will be their last few hours together. This bonding breaks down the communication barrier, allowing the dog to understand Bart's commands, and consequently pass the obedience school.

Santa's Little Helper has fathered several puppies. In "Two Dozen and One Greyhounds" (season six, episode twenty, 1995), he runs away to the dog racing track where he mates with a female hound named She's the Fastest. She later gives birth to 25 puppies and when the Simpsons cannot take care of them any longer, they decide to sell them; however, Mr. Burns steals the puppies and decides to make a tuxedo out of them. Before he does this, however, he becomes emotionally touched by them. This convinces him to never wear fur again and instead raise the puppies to be world-class racing dogs. Santa's Little Helper sires another litter of puppies with Dr. Hibbert's poodle in the episode "Today I Am a Clown" (season 15, 2003). These puppies are given away to townspeople.

The dog has been neglected or treated unfavorably by the family in some episodes. In "Dog of Death" (season three, 1992), he nearly dies of bloat and they decide to make budget cuts in order to pay for the required operation. Although the dog's life is saved, the family begins to feel the strain of their sacrifices and starts treating him badly, causing him to run away. He ends up in the possession of Mr. Burns, who trains him to become a vicious attack dog. Several days later, Bart stumbles upon the trained Santa's Little Helper and is attacked, but the greyhound eventually recognizes his old friend and stops. In "The Canine Mutiny" (season eight, 1997), Bart uses a fake charge card to buy a well-trained Rough Collie named Laddie from a mail-order catalog. Laddie learns many tricks that Santa's Little Helper is completely unable to perform, and the Simpson family nearly forgets about their old pet. Bart eventually gives Santa's Little Helper away instead of Laddie when repo men take back everything he fraudulently purchased. Feeling guilty about this disloyalty and bored with his too perfect new dog, Bart tries to get him back. When he finally finds him, Santa's Little Helper is serving as a seeing-eye dog for a blind man, but eventually decides to return to the family.

In "Stop or My Dog Will Shoot" (season 18, 2007), Santa's Little Helper becomes a local hero after finding a lost Homer, and the Simpsons decide to enroll him in the Animal Police Academy. However, his new crime-fighting job makes him jaded and one day at home he bites Bart. The Simpsons must therefore send the dog away to live with officer Lou. However, he gets to return after saving Bart from a toxic smoke cloud at school and then leaving the police force. In "How Munched is That Birdie in the Window?" (season 22, 2010), after Santa's Little Helper devours a pigeon with a broken leg that Bart was nursing, Bart gets mad at the dog and is unable to forgive him. The Simpsons therefore give him away to an ostrich farm. There, Bart says goodbye to him and explains that he should never, ever devour a bird. Bart then gets into a fight with an angry ostrich. After remembering that he was told that it's wrong to kill birds, he ceases to aid Bart in the fight, confused at his own loyalty (for Bart's sake or his orders) leaving Bart to strangle the ostrich. Bart then realizes that he could not help killing the pigeon and apologizes. Afterwards, the family goes back home with the dog.

The dog once replaced Duffman as the mascot for Duff Beer in the episode "Old Yeller Belly" (season 14, 2003), after he was seen drinking from a can of beer by balancing it on his nose. He becomes known as Suds McDuff and boosts sales of Duff Beer, making the family's fortunes explode. However, this prompts his original sleazy owner and racing trainer to visit the Simpsons and prove that he's the owner of the dog. The family later figures that if they can get Duffman to replace Suds as the Duff mascot, they can get their dog back. They plan to turn Duffman into a hero at a Duff Beer-sponsored beach volleyball event; however, their plan fails and a drunk shark that's discovered at the event becomes the new mascot instead. Santa's Little Helper gladly returns to the Simpson family.

== Creation and development ==
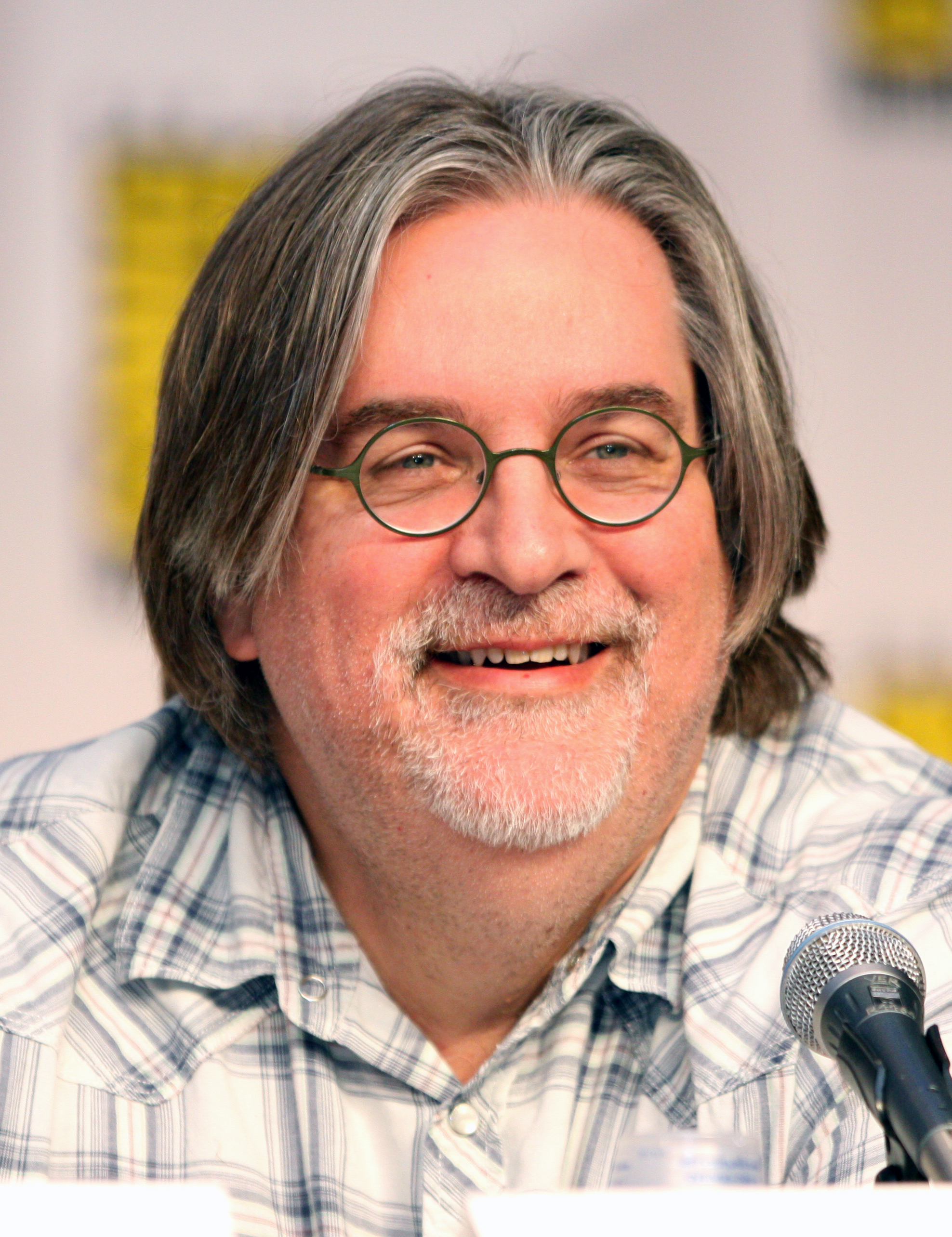
The Simpsons creator Matt Groening prefers that animals in cartoons act realistically.

Santa's Little Helper's initial appearance on The Simpsons was in the first episode of the series, "Simpsons Roasting on an Open Fire", which aired on December 17, 1989. Since then, he has become a recurring character. The Simpsons creator Matt Groening told TV Guide in 2000 that "we [the staff] painted ourselves into a corner with our Christmas episode. Once we wrote the dog into the show, we were stuck with him." The name "Santa's Little Helper" was chosen because, according to writer Al Jean in the same TV Guide article, "we needed a name that would inspire Homer to bet on him, an omen, a Christmas name since he was betting on Christmas Eve. But, at that point, nobody was thinking long-term. We weren't considering what might happen in ten years, when we've got to use this name." Although "Simpsons Roasting on an Open Fire" was the first episode of the series to air on TV, it was the eighth episode produced by the staff. It was chosen to air first because there were animation problems with the others. Jean told the Houston Chronicle in 2001 that after the first episode was broadcast and "the next seven didn't have the dog, people wondered why." He also said in 2003 that the staff enjoyed the first episodes that centered on him, particularly "Simpsons Roasting on an Open Fire", which is the reason that more episodes about him were written.

Writer John Swartzwelder has noted that the staff members of the show write the character Homer in the same way that they write Santa's Little Helper: "Both are loyal. Both have the same emotional range. And both will growl and possibly snap if you try to take their food." Although animals in cartoons often behave with "semi-human awareness", Groening said on the DVD audio commentary for the episode "Two Dozen and One Greyhounds" that he prefers animals in cartoons to behave exactly the way they do in real life. As a result, Santa's Little Helper is depicted in this way on the show. There have, however, been some exceptions for gags, but most of the time the staff of The Simpsons tries to keep animals acting realistically. Several journalists have commented on the greyhound's lack of intelligence. In an article that compared The Simpsons to the animated series Family Guy, Todd Camp of the Fort Worth Star-Telegram noted that "though Santa's Little Helper may be the only Simpson who's dumber than Homer, the Griffins' pooch [Brian Griffin] is the brainiest member of the household". In 1991, Copley News Service's Alison Ashton described Santa's Little Helper as a "sweet and stupid dog". Tom Coombe of The Morning Call wrote in 2002 that "fans of The Simpsons will tell you that the cartoon family's dog [...] is often dumb, disobedient and skittish. Fans of the real-life breed will paint a different picture — of dogs that are peaceful, affectionate, [and] not given to drooling, panting".

Some ideas for episodes featuring Santa's Little Helper come from reality. The plot of "Dog of Death" was based on Swartzwelder's experiences with his own dog, which had also suffered from bloat. However, unlike the events in the episode, Swartzwelder's dog did not receive treatment as the operation was too expensive and the dog was too old. The Gold Coast Bulletin's Ryan Ellem commented in 2005 that the Simpson family's dilemma with the cost of the veterinary procedure is a realistic dilemma faced by many families who own dogs. Other episode ideas come from popular culture. For example, Santa's Little Helper fathering 25 puppies in "Two Dozen and One Greyhounds" is a parody of the Disney film One Hundred and One Dalmatians, and Mr. Burns' technique of brainwashing him into an attack dog in "Dog of Death" parodies A Clockwork Orange. Susan McHugh, who teaches theories of animals, literature, and culture at the University of New England, wrote in her 2004 book Dog that, "remaining loyal to his unlikely saviours, the boy Bart and his father Homer, this greyhound has prompted satires of contemporary dog culture, from Barbara Woodhouse's authoritarian training methods [in "Bart's Dog Gets an 'F'"] to Lassie's flawless service to the status quo [in "The Canine Mutiny"]."

=== Sounds ===
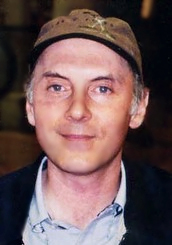
Dan Castellaneta currently voices Santa's Little Helper.

Although cast member Dan Castellaneta occasionally voiced Santa's Little Helper for bit parts, American voice artist Frank Welker most often provided the sounds of the dog and other animals on the show from "Bart's Dog Gets an 'F'", which aired on March 7, 1991, to "Home Sweet Homediddly-Dum-Doodily", which aired on October 1, 1995. He said on his official website in 2007 that he liked portraying Santa's Little Helper because the dog was a "sympathetic" character. Welker has been praised by staff members for his performances on the show. David Mirkin has noted that "he can do anything, and it fits perfectly. You forget you're listening to a guy, and he's a pleasure to work with." Groening has commented that he was "unbelievably good" at doing animal noises. After 1995, Castellaneta voiced Santa's Little Helper on his own while Welker performed other animal noises until his full departure in 2002, when he was denied a pay raise. In the "questions and answers" section on his website, Welker revealed that the reason he stopped performing as Santa's Little Helper was because "The producers thought... 'Hmmm, Dan barks pretty good, and we are already paying him and he seems to like doing the dog thing... why do we need to pay Welker who comes in here, spends less than an hour, eats all the doughnuts, refuses to come to rehearsals... let's just give the damn dog to Dan!'"

== Reception ==
Santa's Little Helper has become a well-known dog because of his appearances in the series. A writer for The Grand Rapids Press wrote in 2002 that "we all know who Homer, Marge, Bart, Lisa and Maggie are—heck, most Americans probably recognize their pets, Santa's Little Helper and Snowball II". McHugh wrote in Dog that while Master McGrath was the most famous greyhound of the 19th century, "the most popular greyhound a hundred years later" is Santa's Little Helper. In the television special 50 Greatest TV Animals that was hosted by Mario Lopez and aired on Animal Planet in 2003, the dog ranked 27th. Other dogs featured on the list were Lassie (first), Eddie (fifth), Snoopy (sixth), Scooby-Doo (13th), Rin Tin Tin (14th), Max (20th), Triumph the Insult Comic Dog (24th), Buck (29th), Chipper (44th), and Tiger (50th). According to a writer for McClatchy News Service, the rankings were "determined by popularity, name recognition and how long the show lasted."

Among fans and critics, Santa's Little Helper has been mostly well received. He ranked seventh in a 2008 poll by Dog Whisperer's Cesar Millan that determined the "best-loved television dog of all time." Lassie ranked first in the poll. In addition, he was voted the tenth favorite Simpsons character by readers of Simpsons Comics in the United Kingdom in 2010. In a list of their top twelve favorite dogs from cartoons, comics, and animation, writers for The Tampa Tribune listed Santa's Little Helper at number six, writing: "We admire his upbeat nature even after having his legs broken by Mr. Burns and being abandoned by Bart for another dog, Laddie." He also ranked 75th on Retrocrush author Robert Berry's list of "The 100 Greatest Dogs of Pop Culture History" in 2006. The character has attracted some criticism too, though. While reviewing the episode "Bart's Dog Gets an 'F'" in 2010, Nathan Rabin of The A.V. Club wrote:

"As cartoon dogs go, Santa’s Little Helper is spectacularly unspectacular. In a realm of aggressively anthropomorphic canines, some of whom, admittedly, have strong speech impediments, he doesn’t talk or wisecrack or engage in shenanigans. His abilities and powers begin and end with masticating, defecating, and regular napping. You know, just like a real dog. Consequently, episodes devoted to Santa’s Little Helper tend to be a little on the sleepy side, even the Simpsons Christmas special that launched the series."

In 2022, Yard Barker named Santa's Little Helper as 12th most memorable TV pets.

== Influence ==
Since his first appearance on The Simpsons, Santa's Little Helper has appeared in merchandise relating to the show. On the board art of The Simpsons Clue, a 2000 board game by USAopoly based on Clue, he is shown drinking Duff Beer that has been spilled on the floor. In another board game published by USAopoly called The Simpsons Monopoly, based on Monopoly and released in 2001, the dog is featured as one of the six pewter playing pieces. Santa's Little Helper has also appeared in issues of Simpsons Comics, in the 2007 film The Simpsons Movie, and in video games based on The Simpsons such as Night of the Living Treehouse of Horror and The Simpsons Game. In addition, the dog has been made into action figures by McFarlane Toys, action figures by Playmates Toys in the World of Springfield series, and plush toys. In the Springfield section surrounding The Simpsons Ride at Universal Studios Florida and Universal Studios Hollywood, one carnival game is themed as "Help Santa's Little Helper".

Santa's Little Helper has made an impact on real life in that an espresso-based drink has been named after him at the award-winning restaurant and bar Bambara in Salt Lake City's Hotel Monaco. Bartender Ethan Moore told The Salt Lake Tribune in 2004 that it is "one of the most popular holiday drinks" at Bambara. In addition, a dog walking and pet sitting company in New York City, called "Santa's Little Helper Dog Walking and Pet Sitting", has been named after him. The greyhound has also appeared by himself on the cover of the October 16, 2000 issue of TV Guide. This issue was released with 24 different covers, all featuring different characters from The Simpsons.
