= Deep, Deep Trouble =

1991 single by The Simpsons

- U.S. commercial CD maxi-single

Single by The Simpsons

from the album The Simpsons Sing the Blues
- Released: March 7, 1991
- Recorded: September 1990
- Studio: The Warehouse (Philadelphia, Pennsylvania); Lion Share (Hollywood, California)
- Genre: Comedy hip hop; jazz rap; R&B; novelty; pop-rap
- Length: 4:28
- Label: Geffen
- Songwriters: Matt Groening; DJ Jazzy Jeff
- Producers: John Boylan; DJ Jazzy Jeff

The Simpsons singles chronology
"Do the Bartman" (1990)	"Deep, Deep Trouble" (1991)	"God Bless the Child" (1991)

"Deep, Deep Trouble" is a rap song from the 1990 Simpsons album The Simpsons Sing the Blues, performed by the fictional character Bart Simpson (voiced by Nancy Cartwright) about his trouble-making antics. It was written by Matt Groening and DJ Jazzy Jeff and recorded in September 1990.

The song was released as the second single from the album in early 1991 and an accompanying music video (directed by Gregg Vanzo) was broadcast on television on March 7, 1991. This video has since been released on DVD as part of the 2002 boxset The Simpsons: The Complete Second Season.

"Deep, Deep Trouble" charted in several countries around the world, peaking at number one in Ireland and entering the top 10 in New Zealand and the United Kingdom. Critical reception of the song was positive, with its humorous lyrics and Cartwright's performance being singled out for praise.

== Background ==
"Deep, Deep Trouble" appeared on the successful 1990 album The Simpsons Sing the Blues that features songs sung by the characters from the American animated television series The Simpsons. It was recorded along with the rest of the album during late 1990, at which point the cast members of The Simpsons were also recording the second season of the series. The song was written by The Simpsons creator Matt Groening and DJ Jazzy Jeff, and produced by DJ Jazzy Jeff and John Boylan. DJ Jazzy Jeff provided the drum programming, keyboards, and scratches on "Deep, Deep Trouble".

The song is a rap performed by the character Bart Simpson about his trouble-making antics. Groening has described it as "the tragic story of Bart Simpson, a bad youth gone worse." The Simpsons cast member Nancy Cartwright, who voices Bart on the show, provided the character's voice in "Deep, Deep Trouble" as well. The characters Homer Simpson and Maggie Simpson are also featured, with Homer (voiced by Dan Castellaneta like on the show) ranting at Bart, and Maggie sucking on her pacifier to the beat of the song.

"Deep, Deep Trouble" was released in early 1991 as the second single from The Simpsons Sing the Blues after "Do the Bartman", which also features Bart rapping. That single achieved much popularity, charting highly on the singles charts in Australia, Ireland, New Zealand, Norway, and the United Kingdom, and eventually becoming certified gold in the latter country with 400,000 units sold.

== Reception ==
"Alarm was buzzin', I was snoozin',
Supposed to get up now, but I was refusin'
To let reality become an intrusion,
'Cause in dreamy-dream land, I was cruisin'.
But the buzz kept buzzin', my head kept fuzzin',
Gave the radio a throw, and heard an explosion.
(Homer: D'oh!)
Opened up my eyes, and to my surprise,
There stood Homer, and his temperature rise."

— Sample of the song's lyrics, rapped by Bart

The song received a positive response from critics. Sommer Swindell of the Observer-Reporter commented that "after listening to [The Simpsons Sing the Blues] once, no one will forget 'Deep, Deep Trouble' [...] It would be hard not to crack a smile while listening closely to the lyrics, as they are very creative and humorous." Thor Christensen of The Milwaukee Journal wrote that Bart "gets in a few good yuks" in the song, and Walt Belcher of The Tampa Tribune reported that Bart "raps out an amusing story about his misadventures while mowing the lawn". The Orange County Register's Cary Darling noted that "Bart turning his life into a hip-hop autobiography on 'Deep, Deep Trouble' is an absolute joy." Cartwright's rapping was praised by Tom Hopkins of the Dayton Daily News.

Commercially, the single was not as successful as "Do the Bartman", but it still charted high in a few countries, reaching number one in Ireland, the top 10 in the UK and New Zealand, and the top 20 in Sweden.

== Music video ==
The music video for the single premiered on the Fox network in the United States on March 7, 1991, together with the Simpsons episode "Bart's Dog Gets an "F"" of the series' second season. When "Do the Bartman" was released it was also accompanied by a music video, which ended up being nominated for Best Special Effects at the 1991 MTV Video Music Awards and becoming the number one music video on the American network MTV. The version of the song used in the video is an edit, containing fewer lyrics than the album version.

The video for "Deep, Deep Trouble", starts with son Bart being shoved into what appears to be a jail cell by father Homer, who illustrates in flashback the things he raps about in the song in a “day in the life” manner, showing how he is forced by Homer to mow the lawn after throwing a buzzing alarm clock at his father in his sleep. When Homer tells Bart to hurry up due to his slow pace, the boy accidentally runs over the sprinkler, thus resulting in him staying home when the family goes to see a boat show. After they leave, and after Bart finishes a brief sunbathing period, he decides to throw a party and invites his friends. They make a mess in the house and when Homer and Marge return home, along with their daughters Lisa and Maggie, Bart realizes he is in, indeed, deep deep trouble. The next day, Homer later takes Bart to the barber, where his hair is shaved off, and is then laughed at by his peers because of it. During each chorus until the final verse, Bart finds himself in a different punishment-type scenario. First, Bart tumbles down into a courtroom where multiple Homer clones and his witnesses find Bart guilty. Then in the next one, Bart is in a “capital punishment” situation via electric chair, before escaping the Homer officers’ cuffs, but then winds up in the chair anyway, ready to be shocked. Finally in the last scenario, Bart plummets down to Hell and is greeted by a wheel that lands on “Re-incarnation” after it has spun, but only to appear reincarnated as a snail. Joanne Ostrow of The Denver Post thought the video was not "nearly as clever as the cartoon" and that it had "'promotional gimmick' written all over it." "Then again, I never thought the video of the dance rap 'Do the Bartman' would be a ratings hit when it aired in December. So what do I know?" she added.

The music video features both original animation and old animation from the series and the Simpsons shorts that aired on The Tracey Ullman Show before they were spun off into The Simpsons in 1989. Gregg Vanzo directed the video, which, according to him, features quicker character poses than in episodes of the show to allow the animation to match the hip-hop beat. The music video was later included on the 2002 DVD boxset The Simpsons: The Complete Second Season, with audio commentary from its producers.

== Track listing ==
- US maxi-single CD
1. "Deep, Deep Trouble" (Dance Mix Edit) (remixed by DJ Jazzy Jeff) – 4:13
2. "Deep, Deep Trouble" (Full Dance Mix) (remixed by DJ Jazzy Jeff) – 5:50
3. "Deep, Deep Trouble" (LP Version) – 4:28
4. "Sibling Rivalry" (LP Version) – 4:40

== Charts ==
=== Weekly charts ===
Weekly chart performance for "Deep, Deep Trouble"
Chart (1991)	Peak position
Australia (ARIA)	35
Belgium (Ultratop 50 Flanders)	41
Europe (Eurochart Hot 100)	25
Finland (Suomen virallinen lista)	15
Germany (GfK)	45
Ireland (IRMA)	1
Netherlands (Dutch Top 40 Tipparade)	3
Netherlands (Single Top 100)	37
New Zealand (Recorded Music NZ)	10
Sweden (Sverigetopplistan)	13
UK Singles (OCC)	7
UK Airplay (Music Week)	28
US Billboard Hot 100	69
US Hot R&B/Hip-Hop Songs (Billboard)	37
US Cash Box Top 100	66

=== Year-end charts ===
Year-end chart performance for "Deep, Deep Trouble"
Chart (1991)	Position
Sweden (Topplistan)	91
UK Singles (OCC)	97
