= The Simpsons Sing the Blues =

1990 album by The Simpsons

Studio album by The Simpsons
- Released: December 4, 1990
- Recorded: September 1990
- Studio: Record One (Los Angeles); Lion Share (Hollywood); The Warehouse (Philadelphia)
- Genre: R&B; Hip-hop; blues; gospel
- Length: 40:13
- Label: Geffen
- Producer: John Boylan; Michael Jackson; Bryan Loren; DJ Jazzy Jeff

Matt Groening chronology
Crazy Backwards Alphabet (1987)	The Simpsons Sing the Blues (1990)	Stranger than Fiction (1992)

The Simpsons chronology
The Simpsons Sing the Blues (1990)	Songs in the Key of Springfield (1997)

Singles from The Simpsons Sing the Blues
- 1. "Do the Bartman" Released: November 20, 1990; 2. "Deep, Deep Trouble" Released: March 7, 1991; 3. "God Bless the Child" Released: 1991

The Simpsons Sing the Blues is the debut musical album by characters of The Simpsons animated franchise. The album features these characters (their singing voices performed by their regular voice actors) singing both covers and original songs in pop, blues, jazz, soul and hip-hop styles.

The album features "Moaning Lisa Blues,” which was first featured in the episode "Moaning Lisa” aired in the United States on February 11, 1990. The album was released on December 4, 1990, and peaked at No. 3 on the Billboard 200.

An early musical number, "Do the Bartman,” starts the album off as the first track and its leading single. It was an international success, including being the United Kingdom number one single on February 16, 1991, staying there for a further two weeks being certified gold after selling over 400,000 copies. The second single released, "Deep, Deep Trouble" also did well in the UK, reaching number 7. "Do the Bartman" and "Deep, Deep Trouble" were released as music videos in 1990 and 1991.

Different cast members lent their voices to the album with both new material and cover songs. There were a number of notable musicians who appeared on the album, including B.B. King, DJ Jazzy Jeff, Dr. John, and Marcy Levy.

== Background ==
David Geffen, founder of Geffen Records, had the idea to record an album based on The Simpsons, to be released in time for Christmas 1990. According to series creator Matt Groening, "James L. Brooks walked into the office one day and said 'The Simpsons Sing The Blues'...Then we spent a lot of time deciding what the blues was...". The writers wrote humorous lyrics for the actors to perform over blues and hip-hop. The voice actors for the series recorded the album in September 1990. The album was difficult to produce in between production for the second season of The Simpsons, which was due to premiere just two weeks later. The album's title was penned by producer James L. Brooks. "We plundered a number of different styles for the record", admitted creator Matt Groening in a 1990 interview. The disc contains an eclectic mix of old blues tunes such as Billie Holiday's "God Bless the Child" and original songs such as "Deep, Deep Trouble", which was produced by DJ Jazzy Jeff and written by Groening. Noticing how Bart had been embraced by the African-American communities of America, Matt Groening sought to write Bart a hip-hop number.

By September 28, 1990, the vocal cast had been recording for around a month, and had completed two rough cuts of songs in between recording for the TV show. At this point, the album was due out in November. Fox had ordered around a dozen camera crews to interview and tape the voice cast, though instead of recording tracks the actors mostly pretended to sing for the cameras.

== Release ==
The album faced great publicity before its release, with several details leaking out. Fox attempted to keep the record under wraps until negotiations with performers such as Michael Jackson were nailed down. One particular element that was highly publicized was Jackson's involvement, which was denied around the time of the album's release. "Oh, it's so frustrating," lamented Groening in a 1990 interview. "I said to a reporter a while ago that I would like to have this happen and it was printed as if it was true." Early published reports attributed Jackson as the composer of "Do the Bartman", which led to James L. Brooks issuing a press release apologizing for any misunderstanding about who actually wrote the song, instead revealing that Bryan Loren wrote the song. Fox also organized a media event around the album, pulling in nearly a half-dozen camera crews to interview and tape the would-be recording stars in action.

The Simpsons Sing the Blues was released on December 4, 1990, and was a success, peaking at No. 3 on the Billboard 200, making it the highest charting Simpsons album. The album was also a success in the United Kingdom, where it peaked at #6 on the albums chart and was eventually certified gold. The lead single from the album, "Do the Bartman", was released on November 20, 1990, followed by the unveiling of animated music video after the Simpsons episode "Bart the Daredevil" on December 6. After the Fox network premiere, the video was exclusive to MTV. The song wasn't actually released as a physical single in the US, which perhaps helped sales of the album. The music video for "Deep, Deep Trouble" debuted after "Bart's Dog Gets an "F"" on March 7, 1991.

On December 14, 1990, the album was certified platinum, having sold over 1 million copies in its first week of release. Within a matter of weeks, the record was certified double platinum by the Recording Industry Association of America, on February 13, 1991, for sales of over 2 million copies.

On July 22, 2013 the album was certified Gold by the British Phonographic Industry in the UK.

== Reception ==
Professional ratings
Review scores
Source	Rating
AllMusic	2.5/5 stars
Entertainment Weekly	C+
Tiny Mix Tapes	1.5/5 marks

"I thought this phenomenon had reached its zenith when the Simpsons' Sing the Blues disc became the fastest selling recording in this country for awhile last year. Forget about that, I was wrong. Dead wrong."

— Thrust Magazine

The New York Times placed the album on their list of worst albums of the year in 1990, stating that "The television series was at least mildly subversive, not to mention funny; the album mangles old songs and takes no chances with bland new ones" People described it as a "slick, supercommercial novelty act", and that it seemed the producer's main goal was money rather than comedy or drama. Florida Flambeau expressed relief that the album wasn't a Christmas record, although felt that it was "mostly pointless" without being paired with the funny visuals of the show, and wished more songs had been written specifically for the characters. Thrust magazine expressed disdain that such a popular album was created by fictional recording artists, noting "Most people have to die before they sell so many records, but The Simpsons will never die. They don't exist". Commoner found it as an example of the rampant commercialization of The Simpsons in the early 1990s.

Hatchet negatively compared it to the 1997 television series soundtrack album Songs in the Key of Springfield, noting that the latter is "actually funny". Lambda felt the new album would be a "nice change" from the former, whose single “Do the Bartman” had become tiring.

== Legacy ==
The Simpsons Sing the Blues is today regarded as a novelty from The Simpsons' early popularity. Shortly after the record's release and success, record companies rushed to fashion music stars out of animated characters. In January 1991, Mattel announced plans to record a Barbie rock album titled The Look. At the same time, MCA Records was finishing work on an album based on the Mario Bros. characters. SBK and Geffen also enjoyed huge success with albums based on the film Teenage Mutant Ninja Turtles and The Simpsons Sing the Blues. The record soon became the fastest-selling album to emerge from a television show since the Miami Vice soundtrack in 1985. Disney also issued an album of Caribbean songs sung by The Little Mermaid's Sebastian as well as an album of songs sung by the cast of Dinosaurs, a series often compared to The Simpsons during its run. "Do the Bartman" inspired a dance, "The Bartman", that was popular in early 1991.

== Track listing ==
Side one
No.	Title	Writer(s)	Producer(s)	Length
1.	"Do the Bartman"	Bryan Loren	Loren; Michael Jackson	5:10
2.	"School Day" (with Buster Poindexter and Joe Walsh on guitar)	Charles Berry	John Boylan	3:56
3.	"Born Under a Bad Sign" (with B.B. King on guitar)	Booker Taliaferro Jones; William Bell	Boylan	3:08
4.	"Moanin' Lisa Blues" (with John Sebastian on harmonica)	Alfred Jean; Boylan; Jai Winding; Michael Reiss	Boylan	4:48
5.	"Deep, Deep Trouble"	Matthew Groening; Jeffrey Townes	Boylan; DJ Jazzy Jeff	4:27

Side two
No.	Title	Writer(s)	Producer(s)	Length
6.	"God Bless the Child"	Arthur Herzog Jr.; Billie Holiday	Boylan	4:29
7.	"I Love to See You Smile" (with Dr. John on piano)	Randy Newman	Boylan	3:07
8.	"Springfield Soul Stew"	Curtis Ousley	Boylan	2:37
9.	"Look At All Those Idiots"	Winding; Jeff Martin; Samuel Simon	Boylan	3:51
10.	"Sibling Rivalry"	Winding; James Lawrence Brooks; Boylan	Boylan	4:40
Total length:				40:13

== Cast ==
- Dan Castellaneta - Homer Simpson
- Julie Kavner - Marge Simpson
- Nancy Cartwright - Bart Simpson
- Yeardley Smith - Lisa Simpson
- Harry Shearer - Mr. Burns, Smithers

== Charts ==
=== Weekly charts ===
Weekly chart performance for The Simpsons Sing the Blues
Chart (1991)	Peak position
Australian Albums (ARIA)	24
Canadian Top Albums/CDs (RPM)	6
Dutch Albums (Album Top 100)	36
New Zealand Albums (RMNZ)	2
Norwegian Albums (VG-lista)	17
Swedish Albums (Sverigetopplistan)	24
UK Albums (OCC)	6
US Billboard 200	3

=== Year-end charts ===
Annual chart rankings for The Simpsons Sing the Blues
Chart (1991)	Position
New Zealand Albums (RMNZ)	22
UK Albums (OCC)	55
US Billboard 200	28

== Certifications and sales ==
Certifications and sales for The Simpsons Sing the Blues
Region	Certification	Certified units/sales
Argentina	—	151,771
Canada (Music Canada)	2× Platinum	200,000^{^}
Norway (IFPI Norway)	Silver	
Sweden (GLF)	Gold	50,000^{^}
United Kingdom (BPI)	Gold	100,000^{^}
United States (RIAA)	2× Platinum	2,000,000^{^}
^{^} Shipments figures based on certification alone.
