= Songs in the Key of Springfield =

Soundtrack album by The Simpsons
- Released: March 18, 1997
- Recorded: June 1989 – August 1996
- Genre: Soundtrack
- Length: 55:27
- Label: Rhino
- Producers: Danny Elfman; Steve Bartek; Alf Clausen; Anthony D'Amico; Bill Inglot

The Simpsons chronology
| The Simpsons Sing the Blues (1990) | Songs in the Key of Springfield (1997) | The Yellow Album (1998) |

Professional ratings
Review scores
| Source | Rating |
|---|---|
| AllMusic | 5/5 stars |
| New Musical Express | 4/10 stars |

Songs in the Key of Springfield is a soundtrack/novelty album from The Simpsons compiling many of the musical numbers from the series. The album was released in the United States on March 18, 1997, and in the United Kingdom in June 1997. This was the second album released in association with the Simpsons television series; however, the previous release, The Simpsons Sing the Blues, contained original recordings as opposed to songs featured in episodes of the series.

The album was followed by The Yellow Album, a second album of original songs. Hollywood Records released the album on digital and streaming platforms on December 9, 2021. The album is set to be released as a deluxe 2LP color vinyl edition on September 4, 2026, by Hollywood Records.

== Music ==
The first track is an extended version of the main title theme listed as being from the episode "Cape Feare". However, Lisa's saxophone solo featured in the album track is different from the solo that was used in that episode. The theme version matching the one on the album (with the same sax solo) that matches the one on the CD was used, complete with the same sax solo, for the episodes "Monty Can't Buy Me Love", "Simpson Safari" and "The Bart Wants What It Wants", which all aired well after the album's release. In addition, syndicated reruns of "Cape Feare" replaced the original opening with a shorter opening without the extended "chorus line" couch gag.

== Cultural reference ==
The title is taken from the Stevie Wonder album Songs in the Key of Life. Another FOX TV show, The X-Files, had a soundtrack album entitled Songs in the Key of X. The Simpsons podcast Pods in the Key of Springfield is named after this album.

== Chart performance ==
Compared to the previous album released in The Simpsons franchise, The Simpsons Sing the Blues, the album failed to match the success of their previous record. It managed to peak at number 18 in the United Kingdom, where it would become the last charting album for the franchise in that country.

The album was less successful in the United States, where it peaked at #103 on the Billboard 200. However, it was successful on Billboard's Top Kid Audio chart, where it peaked at number one, becoming the first number one on that chart for the franchise.

The album was certified Silver by the British Phonographic Industry twice in the UK. On March 19, 1999, on the Warner Records label and again on July 22, 2013, on the Rhino Entertainment label.

== Track listing ==
1. "The Simpsons Theme" (by Danny Elfman)
2. "We Do" (The Stonecutters' Song) - from the episode "Homer the Great"
  Marge & Homer introduction
  The Stonecutters
3. "Dancin' Homer" (Medley) - from the episode "Dancin' Homer"
  - Crosstown Bridge - The Simpsons – 0:10
  - Capitol City
  The Simpsons
  Tony Bennett
4. "Homer & Apu" (Medley) - from the episode "Homer and Apu"
  - Who Needs the Kwik-E-Mart?
  Lisa introduction
  The Simpsons
  Apu
  - Who Needs the Kwik-E-Mart? (Reprise)
  Homer & Marge introduction
  Homer
  Apu
5. "Round Springfield" (Medley) - from the episode "'Round Springfield"
  - Bleeding Gums Blues
  Lisa & DJ introduction
  Bleeding Gums Murphy
  Lisa
  Alto saxophone solo by Dan Higgins
  - A Four-Headed King
  Bleeding Gums Murphy
  Lisa
  Cast
  - There She Sits, Brokenhearted
  Bleeding Gums Murphy
  Lisa
  - Jazzman (by Carole King and David Palmer)
  Bleeding Gums Murphy
  Lisa
  Alto saxophone solo by Dan Higgins
  Baritone saxophone solo by Terry Harrington
6. "Oh, Streetcar!" (The Musical) - from the episode "A Streetcar Named Marge"
  - White-Hot Grease Fires (Prologue)
  Director (Jon Lovitz)
  Cast
  - Long Before the Superdome
  Chief Wiggum
  - New Orleans
  Cast
  - I Thought My Life Would Be a Mardi Gras
  Marge & Cast introduction
  Marge
  Apu
  - I Am Just a Simple Paper Boy
  Apu
  - Stella
  Ned Flanders
  - She Flies
  (instrumental)
  - The Kindness of Strangers
  Marge
  Cast
7. "Jingle Bells" (by James Pierpont) - from the episode "$pringfield (Or, How I Learned to Stop Worrying and Love Legalized Gambling)"
  Robert Goulet
  Bart
  Smithers
  Mr. Burns
  Nelson
8. "$pringfield" (Medley) - from the episode "$pringfield (Or, How I Learned to Stop Worrying and Love Legalized Gambling)"
  - The Simpsons End Credits Theme ("Big Band Vegas" Version)
  - Gracie Films Logo (Vegas version with slot machine sound at the end)
9. "Itchy & Scratchy Main Title Theme" (by Robert Israel & Sam Simon) - from the episode "Itchy & Scratchy & Marge"
10. "Itchy & Scratchy End Credits Theme" - from The Episode "The Front"
11. "The Day the Violence Died" (Medley) - from the episode "The Day the Violence Died"
  - Not Jazz Chor, but Sad Chor"
  Krusty the Clown
  - The Amendment Song (by John Swartzwelder)
  Jack Sheldon with Kid
  Bart
  Lisa
  Cast
12. "Señor Burns" - from the episode "Who Shot Mr. Burns?"
  Tito Puente & His Latin Jazz Ensemble
13. "The Simpsons End Credits Theme" ("Afro-Cuban" Version) - from the episode "Who Shot Mr. Burns?" (Part Two)
  Tito Puente & His Latin Jazz Ensemble – 0:47
14. "Your Wife Don't Understand You" - from the episode "Colonel Homer"
  Announcer & Cast introduction
  Lurleen (Beverly D'Angelo)
  Homer
15. "Kamp Krusty" (Medley) - from the episode "Kamp Krusty"
  - South of the Border" (by Jimmy Kennedy and Michael Carr)
  Bart & Krusty introduction
  Gene Merlino
  - Gracie Films Logo (Mexican version with "Ole!" at the end)
16. "The Simpsons End Credits Theme" ("Australian" Version) - from the episode "Bart vs. Australia"
17. "The Simpsons End Credits Theme" ("Hill Street Blues" Version) - from the episode "The Springfield Connection"
18. "The Simpsons End Credits Theme" ("It's a Mad, Mad, Mad, Mad World" Version) - from the episode "Homer the Vigilante"
19. "Treehouse of Horror V" (Medley) - from the episode "Treehouse of Horror V"
  - Controlling the Transmission (Prologue)
  Bart
  Homer
  - The Simpsons Halloween Special Main Title Theme
20. "Honey Roasted Peanuts" - from the episode "Boy-Scoutz 'n the Hood"
  Homer
  Marge
21. "Boy Scoutz N the Hood" (Medley) - from the episode "Boy-Scoutz N The Hood"
  - Saved by the Bell
  Apu
  Milhouse
  Bart
  - Jackpot
  Milhouse
  Bart
  - Springfield, Springfield (Parts 1 & 2)
  Bart
  Milhouse
  Cast
  - Remember This?
  Bart
  Lisa
  - Another Edwardian Morning
  Bart
  Marge
  Homer
22. "Two Dozen and One Greyhounds" (Medley) - from the episode "Two Dozen and One Greyhounds"
  - The Pick of the Litter
  Mr. Burns
  Lisa
  - See My Vest
  Smithers introduction
  Mr. Burns
  Maid
  Lisa
  Bart
23. "Eye on Springfield" Theme - from the episode "Flaming Moe's"
  Kent Brockman introduction
  Homer
24. "Flaming Moe's" - from the episode "Flaming Moe's"
  Kipp Lennon
  Cast
25. "Homer's Barbershop Quartet" (Medley) - from the episode "Homer's Barbershop Quartet"
  - One Last Call (by Les Applegate)
  Principal Skinner
  Apu
  - Baby on Board
  The Be Sharps
  Cast
26. "TV Sucks!" - a dialogue sequence from the episode "Itchy & Scratchy: The Movie"
  Homer
  Bart
27. "A Fish Called Selma" (Medley) - from the episode "A Fish Called Selma"
  - Troy Chic
  Agent MacArthur Parker (Jeff Goldblum)
  Troy McClure
  - Stop the Planet of the Apes
  - Dr. Zaius
  Troy McClure
  Bart
  Homer
  Cast
  - Chimpan-A to Chimpan-Z
  Troy McClure
  Cast
28. Send in the Clowns (by Stephen Sondheim) - from the episode "Krusty Gets Kancelled"
  Announcer introduction
  Krusty the Clown
  Sideshow Mel
29. "The Monorail Song" - from the episode "Marge vs. the Monorail"
  Lyle Lanley
  Cast
30. "In Search of an Out of Body Vibe" - a dialogue sequence from the episode "Lady Bouvier's Lover"
  Grampa
  Mrs. Bouvier
31. "Cool" - from the episode "Lady Bouvier's Lover"
  Homer
  Grampa
32. "Bagged Me a Homer" (by Beverly D'Angelo) - from the episode "Colonel Homer"
  Lurleen (Beverly D'Angelo)
  Recording Studio Guy
  Homer
  Marge
  Baritone saxophone solo by Terry Harrington
  Harmonica solo by Tommy Morgan
33. "It Was a Very Good Beer" (by Ervin Drake) - from the episode "Duffless"
  Homer
34. "Bart Sells His Soul" (Medley) - from the episode "Bart Sells His Soul"
  - From God's Brain to Your Mouth
  Bart
  - "In-A-Gadda-Da-Vida" (by Doug Ingle)
  Reverend Lovejoy
  Bart
  Milhouse
  Homer
  Cast
35. "Happy Birthday, Lisa" (by Michael Jackson, credited to W. A. Mozart, due to contractual obligations) - from the episode "Stark Raving Dad"
  Lisa & Bart introduction
  Leon Kompowski (Kipp Lennon)
  Bart
  Lisa
36. "The Simpsons Halloween Special End Credits Theme" ("The Addams Family" Version) - from the episode "Treehouse of Horror IV"
37. "Who Shot Mr. Burns?" (Part One) (Medley) - from the episode "Who Shot Mr. Burns?" (Part One)
  - Who Dunnit?
  - The Simpsons End Credits Theme ("JFK" Version)
38. "Lisa's Wedding" (Medley) - from the episode "Lisa's Wedding"
  - The Simpsons End Credits Theme" ("Renaissance" Version)
  - Gracie Films Logo ("Renaissance" Version)
39. "The Simpsons End Credits Theme" ("Dragnet" Version) - from the episode "Marge on the Lam"

== Charts ==
=== Weekly charts ===
| Chart (1997–2026) | Peak position |
|---|---|
| Australian Albums (ARIA) | 26 |
| Belgian Albums (Ultratop Flanders) | 19 |
| Belgian Albums (Ultratop Wallonia) | 150 |
| Irish Compilations (IRMA) | 24 |
| Scottish Albums (Official Charts) | 43 |
| UK Compilation Albums (Official Charts) | 18 |
| UK Soundtrack Albums (Official Charts) | 28 |
| US Top Comedy Albums (Billboard) | 2 |

=== Year-end charts ===
| Chart (1997) | Position |
|---|---|
| Australian Albums (ARIA) | 75 |

== Certifications ==
| Region | Certification | Certified units/sales |
|---|---|---|
| Australia (ARIA) | Gold | 35,000^{^} |
| Canada (Music Canada) | Gold | 50,000^{^} |
| United Kingdom (BPI) | Silver | 60,000^{^} |
^{^} Shipments figures based on certification alone.
