= The Monorail Song =

Song by Conan O'Brien and Al Jean

from the album Songs in the Key of Springfield
- Released: January 14, 1993
- Genre: Showtune
- Songwriters: Conan O'Brien and Al Jean

"The Monorail Song" is a song written for and performed by The Simpsons cast, for the fourth-season episode of The Simpsons entitled "Marge vs. the Monorail", which originally aired on January 14, 1993.

== Production ==
The song was written by then-show runner Al Jean and Conan O'Brien, and was performed by Phil Hartman as Lyle Lanley, along with other Simpsons characters.

== Synopsis ==
The song sees a traveling salesman razzle-dazzle the local town into spending their windfall of money on a monorail, with all criticism being washed aside through the charismatic performance.

The song begins with a repeated whispered chant of "monorail," as Miss Hoover, Apu Nahasapeemapetilon, Barney Gumble, Abraham Simpson, and Chief Wiggum each question his plan in turn, to which Lanley rebukes each with a rhyming phrase.

The crowd is swept into a frenzy, singing a chorus of "monorail." The only person continuing to dissent is Marge Simpson, who hoped to spend the money on fixing Main Street's potholes. Her son Bart points out that "the mob has spoken."

The chorus sings the word "monorail" four more times, and Homer Simpson attempts to sing one more: "mono-D'oh!"

The song is based on "Ya Got Trouble" from the 1958 musical The Music Man, which also concerns a fast-talking salesman conning a small town, with the chorus repeating the word "trouble" under dialogue. During the song, the residents of Springfield get "swept up in Lanley's patter".

An exchange between Lisa and Lanley, highlighting how showmanship masks the truth.

Lisa: Why build a monorail in a small town with a centralized population around a town center?
Lanley: I could answer that question for you, but you and I would be the only ones here who would understand the answer. (leans in) And that includes your teacher!

— The Simpsons, Marge vs. the Monorail

== Critical reception and analysis ==
Bustle deemed it a "quintessential moment" of The Simpsons, when the whole town is caught up in a group number. Like the musical on which it is based, Bustle argues the song teaches a "small lesson in infrastructure and the real reason cons work". It felt the song acted as a "commentary on corruption in political infrastructure" that filled the viewer with "pure dumb joy". The Washington Post deemed it a "brilliant ... sendup" of The Music Man. Junkee felt it was "One of the show’s most overt tributes to musical theatre", and described it as the most "uniquely memorable" the Springfield "hive mind" ever got. Paste Magazine deemed it the "quintessential Springfield ensemble number", and noted how the song summarizes the town's general mob mentality while giving individual characters their moments, and showing that even the 'smart' people of Springfield can be duped. Bustle felt the song "highlight[s] the wonderful recipe of old fashioned small-town whimsy and modern cynicism and aggressive ignorance" that makes up Springfield.

== Legacy ==
The song commonly rates very highly on reviewers' rankings of the best Simpsons songs.

In 1997, it was released as part of the Simpsons soundtrack album Songs in the Key of Springfield.

In November 2025, it was added to Fortnite as a "Jam Track" during Chapter 6 Mini Season 2, which was a crossover focused on The Simpsons.

== Live performances and covers ==
In 2014, Conan O'Brien and Hank Azaria performed the song live at a Simpsons-themed performance at the Hollywood Bowl entitled The Simpsons Take The Hollywood Bowl.
