= Obedience school =

Educational institution for pets

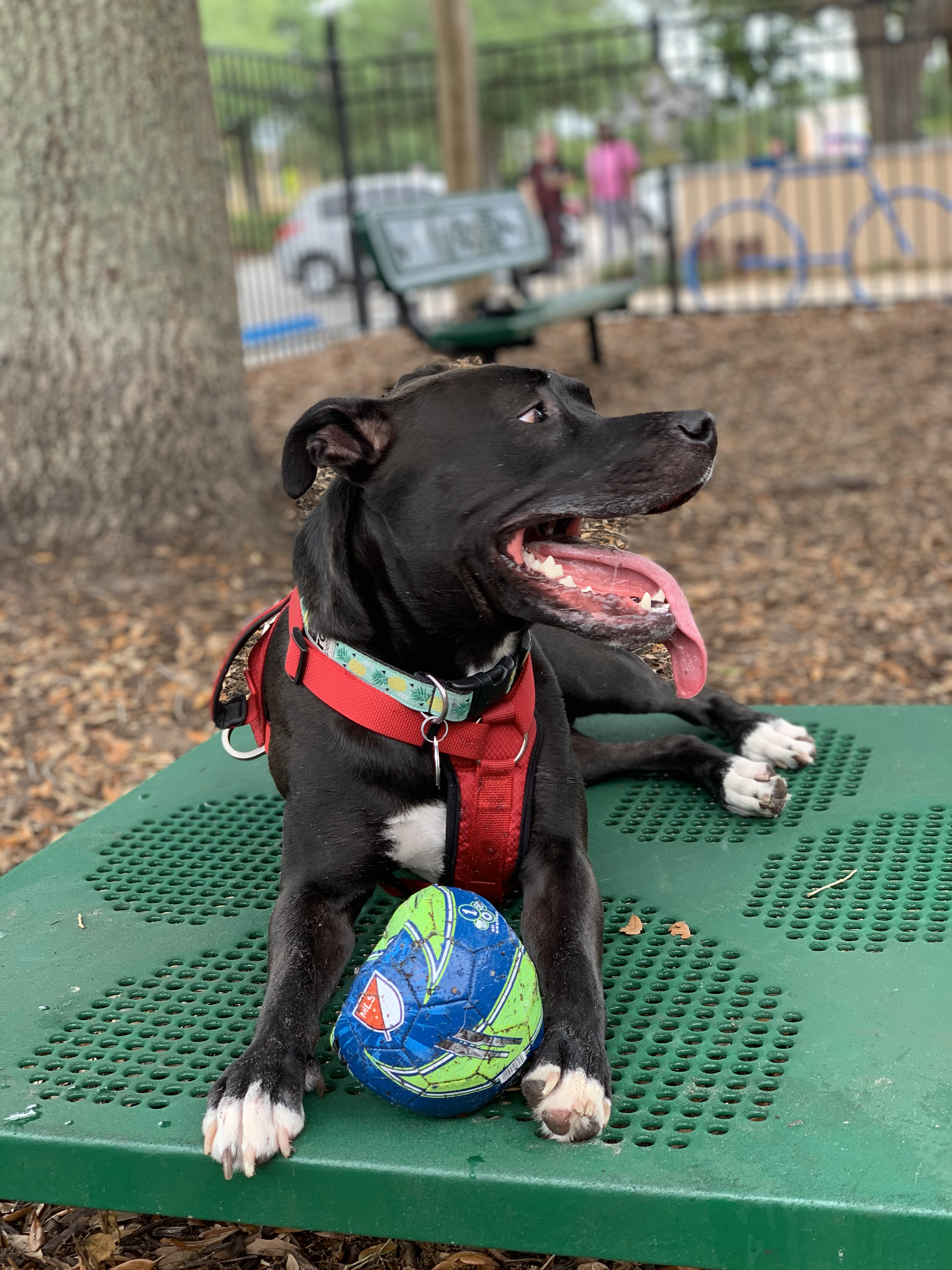

An obedience school is an institution that trains pets (particularly dogs) how to behave properly. When puppies are young and in the first stages of training, they are often taken by their owners to obedience schools. Training usually takes place in small groups. In addition to training pets themselves, obedience schools also teach pet owners how to train, praise, and scold their pets themselves. Schools can teach at a various set of levels, ranging from the very basics for puppies to more advanced for competition level dogs. Most training in schools however, focuses on making dogs listen through basic commands such as sit, stay, lie down, etc.

== Costs of obedience school ==
The prices of obedience school can vary depending on location, age of the dog, and the amount of training a dog requires. For example, group or class training can cost anywhere from $40–$125 per class, while private training, which may take place in the owners' home or trainers places of business, may cost anywhere from $30–100 per class. Dogs usually require 6–8 sessions. Other forms of classes are available as well, such as doggy boarding school which can cost about $950–$2,500; this includes 2–4 weeks of board-and-train. The cost of training can vary depending on the age of the dog as well; training an adult dog will cost more than training a puppy. A trainer may also include small additional costs such as training treats or leash/collar.

== Other forms of dog training ==
Obedience schools are dedicated specifically to obedience training. There are other institutions, like major pet stores Petco and PetSmart that offer specific classes dedicated to obedience training. Dog daycares and animal shelters also provide dog training classes for less money than obedience schools. Places may offer classes that vary in different skill level. The American Kennel Club offers a couple different training options for their members. These training options include puppy class, basic class, Canine Good Citizen program, and other training classes for companion events.

== What to expect ==
Training classes at obedience schools focus on teaching basic obedience skills. Beginner classes typically cover commands such as sit, stay, lie down, and roll over, as well as leash manners and the prevention of unwanted behaviors, including jumping or chewing furniture. Training also emphasizes socialization, helping dogs interact appropriately with people and other animals. According to the American Kennel Club, classes are generally divided into puppy classes for dogs under five months of age and adult or advanced classes for older dogs.

== See also ==
- Obedience training
