= Marge vs. the Monorail =

- The Simpsons episode
- Promotional artwork for the episode featuring Leonard Nimoy
- Episode no.: Season 4 Episode 12
- Directed by: Rich Moore
- Written by: Conan O'Brien
- Production code: 9F10
- Original air date: January 14, 1993

Guest appearances
- Phil Hartman as Lyle Lanley; Leonard Nimoy as himself

Episode features
- Chalkboard gag: "I will not eat things for money"
- Couch gag: The Simpsons sit on the couch, followed by four rows of Springfield's residents sitting in front of the family.
- Commentary: Matt Groening; Al Jean; Mike Reiss; Rich Moore; David Silverman; Conan O'Brien

Episode chronology
← Previous "Homer's Triple Bypass"	Next → "Selma's Choice"
- The Simpsons season 4

"Marge vs. the Monorail" is the twelfth episode of the fourth season of the American animated television series The Simpsons. It originally aired on Fox in the United States on January 14, 1993. The plot revolves around Springfield's impulse purchase of a faulty monorail from a conman, and how it subsequently falls to Marge to stop the train from destroying the town.

The episode was written by Conan O'Brien and directed by Rich Moore. Recurring guest star Phil Hartman provided the voice of Lyle Lanley, while Leonard Nimoy made a guest appearance as himself. "Marge vs. the Monorail" has been widely praised by fans and critics and is generally considered one of the best episodes of The Simpsons. Showrunner Josh Weinstein called it "the best episode of television ever". O'Brien has said that, of the episodes he wrote, this was his favorite. Nimoy's unexpected guest appearance was also widely praised. Despite this, the episode attracted some criticism when it was first aired due to the somewhat abstract and less situational nature of the plot, particularly from voice actor Yeardley Smith who in 1995 described the episode as "truly one of our worst".

== Plot ==
When the Environmental Protection Agency fines Mr. Burns $3 million for dumping nuclear waste in a Springfield park, a town meeting is held to decide how to spend the money. Marge nearly persuades the townspeople to repair Springfield's heavily damaged Main Street, but fast-talking salesman Lyle Lanley leads a song-and-dance routine that convinces them to build a monorail.

After running a questionable training program, Lanley randomly selects Homer as the monorail's conductor. A suspicious Marge visits Lanley's office and discovers he plans to skim money from the project and then leave Springfield. Marge drives to North Haverbrook, a previous purchaser of one of Lanley's monorails, and finds it in ruins.

Marge meets Sebastian Cobb, the engineer who designed North Haverbrook's monorail. Cobb confirms that all of Lanley's monorail projects are scams and offers to help Marge prevent Springfield from suffering the same fate. At the Springfield monorail's inaugural run, Lanley arranges for Leonard Nimoy to be present at a well-attended opening ceremony, which is a diversion that enables Lanley to escape on a plane to Tahiti. When the flight makes an unexpected stopover in North Haverbrook, the town's residents attack Lanley in revenge.

Back in Springfield, the monorail leaves the station just before Marge and Cobb arrive. Substandard equipment causes the train to speed around the track, endangering Homer, Bart and the passengers. Marge and Cobb contact Homer by radio, and Cobb tells him he must find an anchor to stop the train. Homer improvises by prying loose the metal "M" from the engine's side logo, tying a rope to it, and throwing it from the train. The "M" catches on the donut of the Lard Lad Donut store's sign and the rope holds, stopping the monorail. Observing the evacuation, Nimoy announces that his work is done, causing Barney to object that Nimoy did not do anything. Nimoy replies "Didn't I?" before beaming away.

As the passengers disembark, Marge narrates that the monorail was the last folly the people of Springfield embarked upon, except for "the popsicle stick skyscraper, and the 50-foot magnifying glass, and that escalator to nowhere."

== Production ==
The episode was written by Conan O'Brien, who conceived the idea when he saw a billboard in Los Angeles that just had the word "Monorail" on it, with no other details or explanation. He first pitched this episode at a story retreat to Al Jean and Mike Reiss, who said the episode was a little crazy and thought he should try some other material first. O'Brien had previously pitched well-received episodes, including where Lisa had a rival and where Marge gets a job at the power plant and Mr. Burns falls in love with her. James L. Brooks "absolutely loved" this episode when O'Brien presented it.

Leonard Nimoy was not originally considered for the role as the celebrity at the maiden voyage of the monorail, as the writing staff did not think he would accept, because William Shatner had previously turned the show down. Instead, George Takei was asked to guest star, as he had previously appeared as Akira in the second season episode "One Fish, Two Fish, Blowfish, Blue Fish". After demanding several script changes, Takei declined, saying he did not want to make fun of public transportation as he was a member of the board of directors of the Southern California Rapid Transit District (now the Los Angeles County Metropolitan Transit Authority). O'Brien later joked that "we went to the only actor in the world who took monorails seriously". The staff then went to Nimoy, who accepted. Writer Jeff Martin said Nimoy was "just very gracious and easy to work with, and a good sport when we went and recorded his voice."

Phil Hartman was cast as Lyle Lanley because, as Reiss put it, he "was always pretending to be a glad-handing salesman". Martin added, "He was very good at portraying slick, empty people. I think he brought a lot of joy to it".

Director Rich Moore and animator David Silverman called the production process for this episode "huge and ambitious". Because of limited design resources, Moore took photos of buildings to use for various shots. The Lanley Institute came from a building in old town Pasadena. Different locations in North Haverbrook were all photos taken around North Hollywood. Moore bypassed the design team and provided the photos directly to background layout artist Nancy Kruse.

== Cultural references ==
O'Brien has explained that the first part of the episode is a loose parody of The Music Man, his favourite musical, with Lyle Lanley based on Harold Hill and "The Monorail Song" inspired by the show's "Ya Got Trouble". The second half is a parody of the disaster films of Irwin Allen.

The episode starts with a tribute song to The Flintstones as Homer heads home from work and crashes his car into a chestnut tree. The music that plays as Smithers moves the barrel of toxic waste is a spoof of the "Axel F" theme from Beverly Hills Cop. When Mr. Burns is brought into the courtroom, he is restrained in the same way as Hannibal Lecter in the film The Silence of the Lambs. Leonard Nimoy makes a guest appearance as himself. References are made to his role in Star Trek: The Original Series, and to his role as the host of In Search of...

Kyle Darren, the caricature of Luke Perry, star of Beverly Hills, 90210 is present for the opening of the monorail, as is Lurleen Lumpkin from "Colonel Homer", who says "I spent last night in a ditch." Mayor Quimby uses the phrase "May the Force be with you" from the Star Wars franchise, confusing it with Nimoy's work on Star Trek (and—at the same time—believing Nimoy to have been "one of The Little Rascals"). Homer briefly serenades Marge in their bedroom with a line from the folk tune "The Riddle Song". Kent Brockman and Kyle Darren stand near a picture of the Hindenburg. Homer's Monorail conductor uniform is based on uniforms from Star Wars. The monorail's logo peels off after it runs amok, revealing the original logo for the 1964 World's Fair, though that event's train actually used cars suspended from an overhead rail.

== Reception ==
In its original American broadcast, "Marge vs. the Monorail" finished 30th in the ratings for the week of January 11 to 17, 1993, with a Nielsen rating of 13.7. The episode was the highest-rated show on the Fox network that week.

"Marge vs. the Monorail" has frequently been selected as one of the show's best episodes. In 1998, TV Guide included it on its list of top twelve Simpsons episodes. In 2003, Entertainment Weekly released a list of its Top 25 episodes, ranking this episode in fourth, saying "the episode has arguably the highest throwaway-gag-per-minute ratio of any Simpsons, and all of them are laugh-out-loud funny." In his book Planet Simpson, Chris Turner named the episode as one of his five favorites. In 2006, IGN named the episode the best of the fourth season. John Ortved of Vanity Fair called it the third-best episode of the show, due to, "An amazing musical number; Leonard Nimoy in a random guest appearance... Besides being replete with excellent jokes, this episode reveals the town's mob mentality and its collective lack of reason. This is the episode that defines Springfield more than any other." In 2010, Michael Moran of The Times ranked the episode as the ninth best in the show's history. In 2019, Entertainment.ie named it among the ten greatest Simpsons episodes of all time. Later that same year, The Guardian named it one of the five greatest episodes in Simpsons history, Time ranked the episode first in its list of ten best Simpsons episodes picked by Simpsons experts, and Consequence ranked it second on its list of top 30 Simpsons episodes. Josh Weinstein, who worked on the show up until the eighth season, said that "If a gun was put to my head, and they said, 'Tell me the best episode of television ever,' it's this. It's 'Marge vs. the Monorail'."

The authors of the book I Can't Believe It's a Bigger and Better Updated Unofficial Simpsons Guide, Gary Russell and Gareth Roberts, called it "an unsurpassed episode. It's hard to know where to start dishing out the praise—Leonard Nimoy's guest appearance, the Monorail song, Marge's narration, the truck full of popcorn..." Robert Canning of IGN strongly praised the episode, stating "It is by far one of the most loved episodes of The Simpsons and can safely be called a classic by any fan. From beginning to end, there's joke after joke after hilarious joke. There's nothing in this half-hour that doesn't work, and no matter how many times I watch this episode, it never, ever gets old." Emily VanDerWerff of Slant Magazine named it the show's best episode, stating "It's the one you think of when you think of a Simpsons episode", and is "maybe the show's funniest, and it most perfectly encapsulates what may be the show's overriding theme: People are really stupid and self-serving, but if you give them long enough, they'll eventually bumble toward the right answer." In 2012, "Marge vs. the Monorail" was the second-place finisher in a Splitsider reader poll to decide on the best episode of any television sitcom, losing to the Community episode "Remedial Chaos Theory".

Leonard Nimoy's appearance guest as himself has been praised as being one of the show's best. In a list of the 25 greatest guest voices on the show, released September 5, 2006, IGN ranked Leonard Nimoy at 11th. Nathan Ditum ranked his performance as the 13th-best guest appearance in the show's history. Nimoy made a second guest appearance in season eight's "The Springfield Files".

Conan O'Brien has said that of all the episodes of The Simpsons he wrote, this is his favorite. Homer's lines "I call the big one Bitey" and "Donuts, is there anything they can't do?" are among series creator Matt Groening's favorite lines. O'Brien and Hank Azaria performed the monorail song live at the Hollywood Bowl from September 12–14, 2014, as part of the show "The Simpsons Take The Bowl". When The Simpsons began streaming on Disney+ in 2019, former Simpsons writer and executive producer Bill Oakley named the episode as one of the best classic Simpsons episodes to watch on the service.

Supernatural references "Marge vs. the Monorail" in the episode "Something Wicked" when Sam Winchester says that places attacked by the monster included Brockway, Ogdenville and North Haverbrook, all towns mentioned in the song Lyle Lanley uses to persuade Springfield to purchase a monorail.

Conversely, the episode was not initially well received by many fans of the show's earlier seasons, as it was a particularly absurd early example of the show taking a more joke-based cartoon approach to comedy, rather than the more realistic situational style of comedy it had employed in its first few years. In 1995, during the production of the seventh season, Yeardley Smith said of the episode as "truly one of our worst—we [the entire cast] all agree".

The Monorail Society, an organization with 14,000 members worldwide, has blamed the episode for sullying the reputation of monorails, to which Simpsons creator Matt Groening responded in 2021, "That's a by-product of our viciousness... Monorails are great, so it makes me sad, but at the same time if something's going to happen in The Simpsons, it's going to go wrong, right?"

In The A.V. Club, Nathan Rabin writes of the episode's throwaway gags: "it's a testament to the depth and richness of the fourth season of The Simpsons that it could come up with something as awesome as a mutated squirrel with laser eyes solely for the sake of a three-second gag." He concludes this review celebrating the episode's writer O'Brien, noting that the episode "gave Americans an early glimpse inside the beautiful mind and wonderfully warped sensibility of a comedy icon who would go on to become the most successful Simpsons alum of all time (with the possible exception of Brad Bird) as well as a goddamned American treasure."
