= List of fictional drinks =

Many works of fiction have incorporated into their world the existence of beverages or drinks – liquids made for popular consumption – which may create a sense of the world in which the story takes place, and in some cases may serve to advance the plot of the story. These products may be fictional brands which serve as a stand in for brand names, and in that capacity may be a vessel for mockery of the marketing culture associated with brand name products (e.g., Duff Beer from The Simpsons; Buzz Beer from The Drew Carey Show). In science fiction, beverages from alien races may enhance the sense of a futuristic society (e.g. Romulan Ale in Star Trek).

While there are many fictional liquids that can be consumed, fictional liquid medicines and magical potions (such as the liquid that causes Alice to shrink in Alice in Wonderland) may not be widely available for common consumption, or may simply not be described as being used for that purpose, and thus would not be considered "beverages" at all.

== Alcoholic or intoxicating beverages ==
=== In literature and print ===
Beverage	Source	Date of first mention	Description and significance
Moloko Plus (Nadsat for "Milk Plus")	A Clockwork Orange	1962	Aka "milk with knives in it"; drunk by the protagonist to get him in the mood for "a bit of the old ultraviolence". In the film, Moloko Plus is milk laced with one of three, possibly illegal, drugs: Vellocet, Synthemesc and Drencrom. Alex and his droogs prefer the version containing Drencrom.
Herzwesten beer	The Drawing of the Dark	1979	A dark beer, produced only every seven hundred years, that has supernatural properties.
Pan-Galactic Gargle Blaster	The Hitchhiker's Guide to the Galaxy	1978	A legendary cocktail invented by Zaphod Beeblebrox, based on "Old Janx Spirit." The effect of drinking it is "like having your brains smashed out by a slice of lemon wrapped round a large gold brick." Many real-life recipes for the drink exist.
Victory Gin	Nineteen Eighty-Four	1949	A cheap, low-quality drink supplied by the government. It has a "sickly, oily smell" and tastes like nitric acid; swallowing it gives "the sensation of being hit on the back of the head with a rubber club." Winston Smith, the protagonist, frequently drinks it despite its disagreeable taste and smell. Only party members have access to Victory Gin; beer (which is of much better quality than Victory Gin) is the drink of the proles, while wine (which Winston finds disappointingly bland) is only available to the Inner Party.
Old Sock	The last Gold Diggers, The Last Polar Bears	1998, 1993	A drink consumed by Wolves in the Arctic whilst Roo and Grandfather are trying to find polar bears and by Kangaroos and koalas in Australia. Reportedly alcoholic as the Wolves were reported to have been acting in a drunk and disorderly manner.
Austershalin Brandy	The Lies of Locke Lamora	2006	A brandy made by the House of bel Auster in Emberlain. It is a famous mercantile export of Emberlain, and plays a key role in an elaborate confidence trick in the book.
Butterscotch and Buttergin	Charlie and the Chocolate Factory	(1964)	Products marketed by Willy Wonka, the first used to make butterscotch and soda, the second used for buttergin and tonic. The Oompa-Loompas are very fond of both.
Pinot Grand Fenwick	The Mouse That Roared	1955	A wine made in the fictional Duchy of Grand Fenwick, an independent microstate from Leonard Wibberley's Grand Fenwick series. The wine is the Duchy's primary export, and is described as a favourite of wine connoisseurs. Particularly popular in the US, the wine inspired the cheap, Californian, imitation Pinot Grand Enwick, an issue which prompted the events of the novel. In the sequel novel The Mouse on the Moon, a variant of the wine is discovered to have nuclear properties, such that a simple reaction with iron-filings creates enough energy to propel a space ship. This also applies to the 1959 film adaptation of The Mouse That Roared and the 1963 film adaptation of The Mouse on the Moon.
"(A) double standard measure of staol and chilled Shungusteriaung warp-wing liver wine bottoming a mouth of white Eflyre-Spin cruchen-spirit in a slush of medium cascalo, topped with roasted weirdberries and served in a number three strength Tipprawlic osmosis-bowl"	The Player Of Games	1988	An elaborate, potent cocktail ordered by Shohobohaum Za, the Culture's louche ambassador to the Empire of Azad, to celebrate his part in foiling an assassination attempt against the story's protagonist Jernau Morat Gurgeh.

=== In film ===
Beverage	Source	Date of first mention	Description and significance
Black Pony Scotch	Laura	1944	A bottle of the brand is found in the apartment of the title character after her murder, leading the detective investigating the crime to develop suspicions based on his belief that she would not drink so cheap a brand. In the stage play of the film, the product is called Four Horses Scotch.
Elsinore beer	Strange Brew	1985	The plot was loosely based on Shakespeare's Hamlet, but the key characters were either stakeholders or employees of the company that made this beer, which was contaminated by an evil mastermind in a plot to control the world.
Loob Beer	Morons from Outer Space	1982	Jimmy Nail's alien character Desmond becomes a celebrity and ends up as the billboard advertising face for "Loob Beer".
Romulan Ale	Star Trek	1982	A intoxicating beverage which is outlawed within the Federation but nonetheless occasionally shown aboard Federation ships, typically with some commentary as to its prohibited / bootleg status. Generally light to medium-blue in color. Despite the use of the term "ale" in its name, Romulan Ale is depicted on-screen as an uncarbonated liquid poured from a flask or decanter which, along with its high potency, suggests a distilled spirit.
Tenafly Viper	Street Trash	1987	An alcoholic wine that causes anyone who drinks it to melt.
Hice Pale Ale	Final Destination	2003	A beer brand that is seen in every film.

=== In television ===
Beverage	Source	Date of first mention	Description and significance
Ambrosia	Battlestar Galactica	1978 (original series), 2005 (reimagined series)	A high-end liquor, generally depicted as being served neat. Likely analogous to brandy, in the original series it is shown alternately as either red or light brown in color, while in the re-imagined series, it is always bright green.
Bananazura	Behzat Ç.	2010	Beer brand based on Bomonti.
Binge Beer	NASULG	1999	Created by the National Association of State Universities and Land-Grant Colleges (NASULG) for a series of television commercials in their anti-drinking campaign.
Buzz Beer	The Drew Carey Show	May 8, 1996	A mixture of beer and coffee brewed and mixed by the characters in Drew's garage. The production and marketing of this product created numerous situations in which the dynamics of the characters played out. In one episode, a product with the same ingredients called Cap-Beer-Cino was made by a competitor.
Death Comes for the Archbishop	Blandings episode "Problems with Drink"	February 17, 2013	Composed of equal measures (one supposes) of gin, sherry, port, brandy, pudding wine, with a substantial dash bitters, this concoction is guaranteed to "insulate the drinker against the amorous attentions of the female."
Duff Beer	The Simpsons		Consumed by many characters, Duff Beer has been prevalent throughout the series since its introduction in May 1990, and provides a basis for numerous storylines. Variations include Duff Lite, Duff Dry, and Duff Dark. Fudd Beer is sold in competition with Duff Beer, and is reportedly popular in Shelbyville despite having blinded hillbillies.
Fight Milk	It's Always Sunny in Philadelphia episode "Frank's Back in Business"	November 29, 2012	Originated from Charlie and Mac attempting to create "the first alcoholic, dairy-based protein drink for bodyguards by bodyguards." The beverage consists of a mixture of milk, vodka and crow eggs (added for "crowtien"). Fight Milk has also been featured in Season 12's "Wolf Cola".
Flaming Moe (Flaming Homer)	The Simpsons episode "Flaming Moe's"	November 21, 1991	Drink invented by Homer Simpson and then co-opted by Moe Szyslak, which becomes wildly popular. It consists of several alcoholic beverages mixed together with children's cough syrup and is set on fire before serving.
Girlie Girl Beer	Married... with Children		Lead character Al Bundy's favorite beer, and the official beer of his anti-feminist club, NO-MA'AM – that is, until Yoko Ono becomes the brand's official spokesperson.
Glengoolie	Archer		A brand of single malt Scotch whisky, available in several versions, mirroring the color coding of Johnnie Walker (Glengoolie Green, Glengoolie Blue etc.).
Glen McKenna scotch	How I Met Your Mother episode "Intervention"	October 13, 2008	An expensive Scotch appearing at various point throughout the series.
Panther Pilsner Beer	The Three Stooges short subject, Three Little Beers;	November 28, 1935	In this short, the Three Stooges work for the beer company that manufactures this product, and end up sending barrels of it rolling through the streets.
Rigor Mortis	Blandings	March 30, 2014, "Custody of the Pumpkin"	"The secret of a really stiff rigor mortis is plenty of yellow chartreuse," mixed, presumably with gin, and shaken in a large jug.
Rocket Fuel Malt Liquor	NewsRadio	March 19, 1997	Bill McNeal and Catherine Duke argue over Bill's use of urban slang when advertising Rocket Fuel Malt Liquor.
MacCutcheon	Lost	2007, "Flashes Before Your Eyes"	An expensive Scotch whisky that features prominently in many episodes of the series.
Screaming Viking	Cheers	September 24, 1987	This drink is made-up by the bar regulars to boot out the new bartender, Wayne, in favor of keeping Woody. The drink was eventually recreated in real life.
Uncle Jemima's Pure Mash Liquor	Saturday Night Live	February 5, 2000	In three episodes airing February 5, 2000, March 18, 2000, and May 13, 2000; "Uncle Jemima" (played by Tracy Morgan), is the husband of Aunt Jemima, "the pancake lady", and the creator of the beverage in this commercial parody. The commercial jabs at old-time racial stereotypes perpetuated by products like Aunt Jemima. Uncle Jemima comments that while his wife says "sellin' booze is degradin' to our people", "I always say that black folk ain't exactly swellin' up with pride on account of you flippin' flapjacks".
Vitameatavegamin	I Love Lucy episode, "Lucy Does a TV Commercial"	May 5, 1952	Lucy schemes to get on Ricky's TV show by appearing in a commercial for this beverage, which is said to contain "vitamins, meat, vegetables and minerals". As Lucy does repeated takes of the commercial and swallows dose after dose, her increasingly tipsy behavior reveals that the product also contains alcohol.
Zafiro Añejo	Breaking Bad episode, "Salud" Better Call Saul	September 18, 2011	Gustavo Fring gifts Don Eladio a poisoned bottle of Zafiro Añejo, an expensive high-end tequila brand. The brand reappears throughout the spin-off series Better Call Saul, with the agave-shaped bottle stopper becoming a recurring symbol of Jimmy McGill and Kim Wexler's cons.

=== In radio ===
Beverage	Source	Date of first mention	Description and significance
Shires	The Archers	1951	Served in The Bull, Ambridge, the village pub in world's longest running soap opera. A cask beer real ale.
Otter's Crest, Old Monk's Bell, Sailor's Junk, Orbital, Tandoor, Riland's Dark Water, Allison's Amber	Double Science	May 2008	In all episodes fictional real ale is discussed by the errant science teachers. Particularly in episode 3, "4 Extra Premiere".

=== In video games ===
Beverage	Source	Date of first mention	Description and significance
Bloxy Cola	Roblox	May 2009	A carbonated soft drink sold on the Roblox Marketplace, capable of being equipped to your avatar.
Bloxiade	Roblox	October 2009	A purplish energy drink sold on the Roblox Marketplace, capable of increasing the player's speed.
Pißwasser	Grand Theft Auto franchise	April 2008	A German lager, advertised on radio, television, and billboards. Its logo also appears on trucks and buildings. Its name can be translated as "Piss water".
Ion Bru	Void Bastards	May 2019	A type of beer.
Sprunk Beer	Grand Theft Auto: San Andreas	October 2004	Alcoholic variety of "Sprunk", another in-universe beverage in the GTA series.
Red Eagle	Firewatch	2016	A brand of beer brewed in Wyoming, considered low-quality.
Nuka Cola Dark	Fallout 4: Nuka-World	August 2016	Alcoholic variety of "Nuka Cola", the most popular soft drink in the world of the Fallout franchise.
Dragonbreath X	Mouthwashing	2024	A cyan-colored mouthwash that the stranded crew of the Tulpar use to get drunk when the food and water runs out.
Honky Tonic	Space Station 13 (Goonstation Branch)	2021	A slightly debilitating and overtly pink cocktail for clowns made from tonic water, neurotoxin, banana juice and space lubricant, ingestion causes player to uncontrollably laughs and honks while spouting out silly strings of text in the general format of introductory phrase + adjective + noun + ending remark.
Comona	Ace Combat 8: Wings of Theve	2026	A beer named after the Comona Islands. Has the slogan "Ace of Beers."

=== Miscellaneous ===
Beverage	Source	Date of first mention	Description and significance
Bear Whiz Beer	Everything You Know Is Wrong	October 1974	Apparently an ordinary American light lager, depicted in the album Everything You Know Is Wrong and the subsequent 1975 film of the same name as being ladled directly out of a mountain stream by a rugged-looking outdoorsman. Its packaging is described with vaguely sexual undertones, and it is implied to not be beer at all, but rather the product of bears urinating into fresh water, possibly a critique of the inexpensive, mass-produced American lager style beers which are commonly advertised in North America in a similar manner. "As my daddy said, 'Son, it's in the water. That's why it's yellow.'"
Heisler Beer	Various		Essentially a placeholder name for a beer, this brand has appeared in many films and television shows.
Beelzejuice	Helluva Boss	February 2021	Type of whiskey produced in Hell, favored by demons. It can turn terrestrial fish who drink it into sea monsters.

== Non-alcoholic beverages ==
=== In literature and print ===
Beverage	Source	Date of first mention	Description and significance
Jihad Cola	Prayers for the Assassin	2006	A popular soda brand in the future Islamic States of America, where alcohol is outlawed.
Nozz-A-La	The Dark Tower	1997	A fictional soda brand, with a logo similar to Coca-Cola's. The brand name also appears on Henry Gale's balloon in the TV show Lost.
Panta	Danganronpa		Panta is based on Fanta. It is used to avoid copyright, being the favorite drink of Kokichi Ouma.
Sani-Cola	The Adventures of Tintin	1968	A cola rich in chlorophyll marketed by Lazlo Carreidas.

=== In film ===
Beverage	Source	Date of first mention	Description and significance
Adrenalode	Turbo	2013	A potent energy drink promoted by Indianapolis 500 champ Guy Gagné, Adrenalode contains ingredients such as phonisirene, ethylonium, tauranidrene, chloriadium, and tastebadazine which in fine print are "not recommended for ingestion".
Blue milk	Star Wars	1977	A blue-colored milk generated by the Bantha, a species from the planet Tatooine.
Booty Sweat energy drink	Tropic Thunder	2008	Part of the multi-pronged product empire of that film's character, Alpa Chino. The drink, like other products, supports the use of Chino as a parody of other rappers or musicians who become multi-product moguls. Chino has a supply of the beverage throughout the film, and plugs it (anachronistically) during the filming of the Vietnam war film-within-a-film.
Botijola	Mort & Phil. Mission: Save Earth	2008	An awful beverage that contains no water in its formula. The evil producer of the beverage wants to produce a world drought, so people will be forced to drink his product.
Buzzz Cola	Surf II: The End of the Trilogy	1984	A popular soft drink that the film's antagonist, teenage mad scientist Menlo Schwartzer, chemically alters to turn its drinkers into garbage-eating zombie slaves as part of a scheme to rid Southern California of its surfer population. The preferred drink of rebellious youth and mindless drones.
Cadre Cola	The Running Man	1987	The sponsor of The Running Man TV game show.
Dark Planet Cola	Escape from Planet Earth	2013	A sugary green cola popular on the planet Baab that was made to promote Scorch Supernova's mission to Earth, which the Baabians refer to as the Dark Planet.
Fizzy Bubblech	You Don't Mess with the Zohan	2008	A soft drink in an unusually shaped bottle popular in Israel.
Slusho!	Cloverfield, Star Trek	2008 (earlier in Alias)	As part of the viral marketing campaign, the drink Slusho! has served as a tie-in. The drink had already appeared in producer Abrams' previous creation, the TV series Alias.

=== In television ===
Beverage	Source	Date of first mention	Description and significance
Gut Milk	Only Murders in the Building	2021, "Who Is Tim Kono?"	A vanilla-blast flavored supplement and multi-level marketing product sold by Ursula to various residents in the building.
Killer Shrew	Mystery Science Theater 3000	1992, "The Killer Shrews"	Featured in the last two host segments of the episode, a send up of the Alaskan Polar Bear Heater. Composed majorly of candies and sweets, very thick. Joel passes out after a taste, while Frank has an extreme sugar rush. He manages to drink it all, but is very nauseous, prompting Dr. Forrester to give him an ipecac.
Buzz Cola	The Simpsons	1994, "Lisa vs. Malibu Stacy"	Used in The Simpsons series as a parody of Jolt Cola. Bart is often seen drinking it.
Slurm	Futurama	1999, "Fry & the Slurm Factory"	An addictive soft drink used as a favorite of Fry's. Used as the plot of an entire episode where it is learned how slurm is made.
Splode	TheTruth.com	2000, TV commercial	A canned soda described as having "100 times the carbonation of ordinary soft drinks." Part of a series of anti-tobacco parody product commercials.
Sprünt	Knowing Me Knowing You with Alan Partridge	1994	A German soft drink that Alan illegally advertises on his chat show.
Pitt Cola	Gravity Falls	2012, "Tourist Trapped"	Peach flavored soda, popular in the town of Gravity Falls; named after director Joe Pitt.
Thunder Muscle	The Increasingly Poor Decisions of Todd Margaret	2010, "In Which Claims Are Made and a Journey Ensues"	An energy drink which Todd Margaret is tasked with selling in the UK, contains a chemical property sought by terrorists to create weapons. Central to many early-series plot devices and scenarios.
Blam Berry Blitz	Amphibia	2020, "Stakeout"	A high-caffeinated, fruit-flavored energy drink, advertised as "The Drink that Punches You In the Face and Doesn't Stop".
Hindenburg Cola	Animaniacs	2020, "Hindenburg Cola"	German-made brand of soda favored by Dr. Otto von Scratchansniff. It is only sold in one store.
Caf-Pow	NCIS		Caffeinated drink favored by forensic scientist Abby Sciuto and represented on screen first by Hawaiian Punch and later by unsweetened cranberry juice.
Apple Blood	The Owl House	2020, "Witches Before Wizards"	An apple-flavored beverage that is popular on the Boiling Isles. It comes in non-alcohol and alcohol varieties, with the non-alcoholic variety being sold in juice boxes.

=== In video games ===
Beverage	Source	Date of first mention	Description and significance
Blam!	HyperBlade	1996	Consists of Blam, made with nuclear waste water, and lighter-than-Blam! Blam! Light.
Nuka-Cola	Fallout	1997	In the video game franchise Fallout, Nuka-Cola is a unique soft drink inspired by Coca-Cola that gained widespread popularity sometime before the Great War, an atomic war between China and the United States. It comes in multiple flavors, such as Nuka Cola Quantum, which is distinguishable by its blue radioactive glow, Classic Nuka Cola, which is the regular version, Nuka-Cola Dark, an attempt by the company to create an alcoholic beverage, Nuka-Cola Orange, Nuka Grape, Nuka Cola Cherry, Nuka-Cola Quartz, Nuka-Cola Victory and Nuka Cola Wild. Nuka Cola Quantum was then remade by Jones Soda for a limited time offer in stores, though, it is purchasable on some online websites now like eBay. According to Fallout lore, it has a very high sugar content of 43 grams, and it is known to give people withdrawal and vascular problems.
Joja Cola	Stardew Valley	2016	A soft drink brand that is owned by Joja Corporation, an in-game megacorporation. Inspired by Coca-Cola.
BlueTide	Teardown	2022	BlueTide is a soft drink that has an addictive secret ingredient that triggers a police investigation.
DR>BREENS PRIVATE RESERVE	Half-Life 2	2004	A drink found in blue, yellow and red cans.
Sunset Sarsaparilla	Fallout: New Vegas	2010	Sunset Sarsaparilla is a Sarsaparilla company with its beverages being found in the Mojave Wasteland.
Mad Monk Kvass	DayZ	2012	Mad Monk Kvass is a brand of kvass in DayZ named after one of Rasputin's nicknames, the Mad Monk and Mad Monk Kvass has an image of Rasputin on the cans.
Pipsi, Spite, Nota Cola, and Fronta	DayZ	2012	To avoid copyright disputes, the creator of DayZ implemented soft drinks but with altered names (Pepsi, Sprite, Coca-Cola, and Fanta respectively).
Slurp Juice	Fortnite: Battle Royale	2017	A light blue drink which heals its drinker.
NiCola	Cyberpunk 2077	2020	A Japanese brand of Cola often advertised as an aphrodisiac, with slogans such as "Feel the chemistry" and "Taste the love".
eCola	Grand Theft Auto franchise	2006	A product from Sprunk and parody of Coca-Cola.
FunCola	Grand Theft Auto III	2001	A drink company and parody of Pepsi.
Sprunk	Grand Theft Auto franchise	2002–present	A brand of lemon-lime soft drink that is a parody of Sprite.
Bonk! Atomic Punch	Team Fortress 2	2009	Bonk! Atomic Punch is a brand of energy drink featured as an unlockable secondary item for the Scout. When drunk, it grants the player temporary invincibility for 8 seconds, though getting hit by enemy fire will result in a temporary reduction of speed after the effects wear off.
Revelade	Destroy All Humans! 2	2006 2022	Revelade is used as a weapon.
Tasti-Cola	BeamNG.drive	2011	A likely parody of Coca Cola. Appears on the Tasti Cola truck.
Perk-A-Colas	Call of Duty	2008	Perk-A-Colas are brands of soft drinks seen in the zombies mode that give multiple benefits, most of which mirror perks from the multiplayer mode. Notable variants include Juggernog, Speed Cola, Double Tap Root Beer, Quick Revive, PhD Flopper, and Stamin-Up.

=== Miscellaneous ===
Beverage	Source	Date of first mention	Description and significance
Ovalkwik	Schlock Mercenary (webcomic)	2000	A chocolate-like drink mix. It's supposed to be mixed with a liquid before consumption, but Schlock, who is addicted to it, often eats it straight.
SCP-207	SCP Foundation (collaborative writing website)	2010	An abnormal collection of 24 bottles of Coca-Cola. Consumers of the contents (SCP-207-1) are provided with above-standard speed and reflexes, but die within 48 hours due to the failure of organs or internal injuries caused by overactivity. Appears as a consumable item in SCP - Containment Breach to provide a boost in speed for the player character.

== Magical/fantasy beverages ==
=== In literature and print ===
Beverage	Source	Date of first mention	Description and significance
Butterbeer	Fictional universe of Harry Potter	1999	Butterbeer is the drink of choice for younger wizards. Harry is first presented with the beverage in Harry Potter and the Prisoner of Azkaban.
Ent-draught	The Lord of the Rings		An extremely invigorating drink of the tree-like Ents. Characters Merry and Pippin drink this while traveling with the Ents, which results in both characters growing taller.
Getafix's magic potion	Asterix		The magic potion the druid Getafix makes to give the villagers superhuman strength to fight the Romans.
Lacasa	The Road to Oz		"A sort of nectar famous in Oz and nicer to drink than soda-water or lemonade."
Nectar and Ambrosia	Greek mythology	Before; 424 BC	In ancient Greek mythology, nectar is drunk by the gods, and ambrosia (αμβροσία, Greek: immortality) is sometimes the food, sometimes the drink, of the gods, often depicted as conferring ageless immortality upon whoever consumes it. Ambrosia was brought to the gods in Olympus by doves (Odyssey xii.62), so may have been thought of in the Homeric tradition as a kind of divine exhalation of the Earth.
Frobscottle	The BFG	1982	A drink which tastes of vanilla and, in the BFG's words, "makes you whizzpop".

== Fictional beverages later marketed ==
Some real-life beverages were created and marketed after appearing as fictional, as is the case with Duff Beer from the TV show The Simpsons. To promote The Simpsons Movie, convenience store 7-Eleven marketed a Duff-branded energy drink.

- Booty Sweat – Tropic Thunder
- Brawndo – Idiocracy
- Duff Beer – The Simpsons
- Squishee – The Simpsons
- Swill – Saturday Night Live
- Buzz Cola – The Simpsons
- Nuka-Cola produced by Jones Soda during the launch of Fallout 3 and Fallout 4 and again in 2024 after the release of the Fallout TV series.
- Romulan Ale – at the Star Trek Experience in Las Vegas, NV.
- Romulan Ale – an energy drink created and marketed by Boston America Corp.
- Klingon Raktajino – also available previously at the Star Trek Experience.
- Slurm – Futurama
- Victory Gin – In the late 1980s and early 1990s UK off licence chain Victoria Wine sold an own brand of gin called Victory Gin. It was not deliberately styled after the unpalatable product in Nineteen Eighty-Four; rather, it was originally called Portsmouth Gin, but this presumably caused confusion with Plymouth Gin. The name was changed to Victory, after Nelson's famous flagship HMS Victory, a tourist attraction in Portsmouth, the marketers presumably unaware of the brand's literary namesake.

== See also ==
- Independent Studio Services, provider of props, including several fictionally branded beverages, to television and movie productions
