= Gag name =

Pseudonym used to elicit humour

A gag name is a pseudonym intended to be humorous through its similarity to both a real name and a term or phrase that is funny, strange, or vulgar. The source of humor stems from the double meaning behind the phrase, although use of the name without prior knowledge of the joke could also be funny. Examples of the use of gag names occur in works of fiction in which there is a roll call, a listing of names, or a prank call.

Some names that would be considered gag names have been adopted as stage names by performers, often in the adult entertainment industry.

== Examples ==
=== People ===
Occasionally, real people with a name that could be interpreted as a funny or vulgar phrase are subject to mockery or parody. For example, Hu Jintao, former General Secretary of the Chinese Communist Party, whose surname is pronounced like "who", and former Chinese Premier Wen Jiabao, whose surname is pronounced like "when", have occasionally been the topic of humor similar to the "Who's on First?" sketch. Former US Congressman from New Hampshire Dick Swett's name, when pronounced, sounds like common slang for male genital perspiration (dick sweat). Other names in politics which could be regarded as gag names include John Boehner, Harry Baals, Dick Armey, Dick Pound, Dick Kink, and Tiny Kox (although Boehner's surname is properly pronounced "bay-ner", someone who has not heard the name in news coverage could mispronounce it as "boner", while Kox's name could be vulgar in English (cocks), but not in his home nation's Dutch). NASCAR driver Dick Trickle also had such a name. There are also various people named Richard "Dick" Head (dickhead), Mike Hunt (my cunt), Mike Rotch (my crotch), and Mike Hawk (my cock).

Australian entrepreneur Dick Smith released a brand of matches named Dickheads, modeled after established brand Redheads.

Roller derby teams and players frequently use gag names. Often, these are double entendres or suggestive.

The genuine Indian name "Dikshit" (dick shit) has been repeatedly mocked in mass media, often to the offense of people bearing the name.

Another well-known example was the Canadian Dick Assman (dick ass man), who received some public notoriety in 1995 for his name over the course of four months, especially from the Late Show with David Letterman. He died in 2016.

In 2016, resident Rudy Pantoja, Jr. told a Seattle city councilwoman his name was "Hugh Mungus", and she replied, "Humongous what?" in a viral video gaining over 3 million views. T-shirts were sold with the gag name and Pantoja's face on them, while others accused him of sexual harassment.

In October 2022, two amateur improvisational actors played a media prank, pretending to be newly fired Twitter employees "Rahul Ligma" and "Daniel Johnson" on the eve of Elon Musk's takeover of the company, and multiple major media outlets reported the incident as actual news. The Times of India called the Ligma–Johnson hoax "perfectly-timed" and "one of the greatest pranks on the Internet."

=== Newspapers ===
On April 13, 2003, James Scott of the Charleston, South Carolina newspaper The Post and Courier reported that "Heywood Jablome" (a pun for "Hey, would you blow me?", "blow" being slang for fellate) was escorted from the premises while counterprotesting Martha Burk's protest at the Masters Tournament. He subsequently admitted to his being "duped" by the protester, who was in reality a morning disc jockey for a regional FM radio station.

In 2014, Prior Lake High School students received a letter purportedly from the school district that described an upcoming "mandatory vagina inspection" for female students. The letter was signed "Barry McCockiner, Director, Department of Vaginal Corrections". The prank attracted worldwide attention and spawned copycat incidents at other schools around the country. "Barry" is meant to sound like "Bury" and "McCockiner" is meant to sound like "my cock in her".

=== Radio ===
In 2007, an NPR reporter traveled to Hanover, New Hampshire to investigate a test cheating scandal, and interviewed a student who identified himself as Mike Rotch (my crotch). NPR's flagship news program All Things Considered included the fictitious student's name in its story.

=== Television ===
In July 2013, KTVU in San Francisco aired fake names of the Asiana Airlines Flight 214 pilots: "Captain Sum Ting Wong" (Captain, something's wrong), "Wi Tu Lo" (we too low), "Ho Lee Fuk" (holy fuck), and "Bang Ding Ow" (onomatopoeia possibly involved with a crash), a false report which had been incorrectly confirmed by an NTSB intern acting "outside the scope of his authority," who, according to an NTSB spokesperson, had been "acting in good faith and trying to be helpful." The station later apologized, and fired Roland De Wolk and two other news producers over the error.

In January 2017, U.K. sports broadcaster Sky Sports inadvertently reported that Aberdeen had signed a Turkish footballer called "Yerdas Selzavon" (phonetically "your da (father) sells Avon", a reference to the direct-selling cosmetics company) after falling for a gag name on a fake Twitter account.

In 2017, a taxi driver filmed protesting against changes to taxi licensing in Melbourne, Australia gave his name as "Tsim Booky" to the Channel 9 Today Show; tsimbouki (τσιμπούκι) refers to fellatio in modern Greek.

In June 2021, the recently launched GB News channel was plagued by a rash of hoax messages from news comment callers using gag names such as Mike Hunt (my cunt) and Mike Oxlong (my cock's long) to get on the air.

=== Social media ===
In 2021, British politician Nigel Farage, who for a fee would upload personalised videos for fans on the Cameo website, was tricked into posting birthday greetings for "Hugh Janus" (huge anus).

At one point, a web search for "acting CEO of Google" resulted in the answer "Nate Higgers". No such person is confirmed to exist; the claim originated on a LinkedIn profile purporting to belong to the fictitious executive. The name Nate Higgers is a spoonerism of "hate niggers", and the hoax is believed to be a satirical reference to allegations of racial discrimination within Google.

=== Businesses ===
Gag names can also be applied to businesses, such as Howard Stern's use of the fictitious "Sofa King": in a hoax advertisement, the store was described as being "Sofa King great" (so fucking great). A January 18, 2000 FCC complaint about using the phrase was dismissed. A similar sketch was performed on Saturday Night Live in early 2007, portraying Sofa King as a new store opening after the success of Mattress King. A joke about the Fuller Brush Company merging with Schick razors to become the "Fuller Schick Company" (full of shit) was popular enough by 1994 that a New York magazine competition, having solicited joke company mergers, began its results with "Will all those who submitted Fuller Schick please report to the Office of the Grand Inquisitor?"

London Zoo has to employ a telephone screening service on April Fools' Day, because they are deluged with calls from people tricked into asking for gag names such as Sue Keeper (zoo keeper), Ali Gaiter (alligator), Ben Gwinn (penguin) or Jim Panzie (chimpanzee).

== Examples in fiction ==
=== Film ===
The series of James Bond books and films often use double entendres for the names of Bond girls, such as "Honey Ryder" from Dr. No, "Bibi Dahl" (baby doll) from For Your Eyes Only, "Holly Goodhead" from Moonraker, "Xenia Onatopp" from GoldenEye, "Chu Mei" (chew me) from The Man with the Golden Gun, "Plenty O'Toole" from Diamonds Are Forever, and, most famously, "Pussy Galore" from Goldfinger. This is parodied in the Austin Powers series of spoofs on the spy genre; Austin Powers: International Man of Mystery features a villain named "Alotta Fagina", who must repeat her name several times because Austin misunderstands it. In the second sequel, Austin Powers in Goldmember, Austin runs into a pair of Japanese twins named "Fook Mi" and "Fook Yu". Another example being a character from the animated Danish film Terkel in Trouble named "Dick Balsac".

In Monty Python's Life of Brian, there is an extensive use of Dog Latin as a tool for creating gag names. The protagonist's biological father is believed to be called "Naughtius Maximus", while a friend of Pontius Pilate is named "Biggus Dickus" and his wife's name is "Incontinentia Buttocks". One of Pilate's guards also mentions "Sillius Soddus".

The widely known gag name "Mike Hunt", a homophone for "my cunt", appears in the 1982 teen comedy film, Porky's, where a waitress receives a phone call and asks, "Is Mike Hunt here? Has anyone seen Mike Hunt?" ("Everybody in town!" replies a customer familiar with the gag). In the Fast & Furious-franchise film Hobbs & Shaw, Deckard Shaw creates a false identification for Luke Hobbes under the name "Mike Oxmaul" (my cock's small), which becomes apparent when airport security is reading the name out loud, prompting the character to respond, "I go by Michael". In the movie's post credits scene, Luke, in turn, creates a false identification for Deckard, under the name "Hugh Janus" (huge anus)

The name "Lord Farquaad" ("Lord Fuckwad") from Shrek is somewhat notorious for occurring in a family-oriented film.

=== Television ===
Gag names have appeared prominently in several adult-oriented American animated series, including Beavis and Butt-Head, South Park, and most notably The Simpsons, where Bart Simpson frequently calls Moe's Tavern asking for nonexistent patrons with gag names, prompting bartender Moe Szyslak to call out for the person. These gag names include, "Mike Rotch" (my crotch), "Seymour Butz" (see more butts), "Oliver Klozoff" (all of her clothes off), "Amanda Hugginkiss" (a man to hug and kiss), "Ollie Tabooger" (I'll eat a booger), and "Homer Sexual" (homosexual). This running joke is based on the real-life Tube Bar prank calls. However, in the episode "Flaming Moe's", this gag backfired against Bart when he called for a person named "Hugh Jass" (huge ass) when it was revealed that there actually was a patron at Moe's Tavern named Hugh Jass. Similarly, in the episode "Donnie Fatso", a call comes through for a "Yuri Nator" (urinator) from Fat Tony, which is revealed to be an actual bar patron which was misunderstood as a prank call.

=== Radio ===
Episodes of Car Talk followed their actual staff credits with a much longer list of pun-based fictional ones, varying from episode to episode but usually concluding with an "Erasmus B. Dragon" (her ass must be draggin').

=== Other ===
The title of the 1979 Frank Zappa album Sheik Yerbouti was a pun on the hit disco song "(Shake, Shake, Shake) Shake Your Booty".

== Examples in other languages ==
The 2005 South Korean television series Hello My Teacher was criticised for its inclusion of a character with the gag name "Nam Sung-ki". "Sung-ki" is a common masculine name, but "Nam Sung-ki" is homophonous with the Korean language word for "penis".

Ghil'ad Zuckermann suggests that at the end of the twentieth century there was a wave of jocular Israeli gag names in Hebrew, most of them based on rebracketing, including Mira Tsakh (a female detective, based on the rebracketing of mi ratsákh, meaning "Who murdered?") and Avi Ron (a pilot, based on the rebracketing of avirón, meaning "airplane").

== See also ==
- List of places with unusual names
- List of chemical compounds with unusual names
- Knock-knock joke
- Pun § Books never written
- Aptronym; a personal name aptly suited to its owner
