= The Hands of Cormac Joyce =

- Based on: The Hands of Cormac Joyce by Leonard Wibberley
- Written by: Thomas Rickman
- Directed by: Fielder Cook
- Starring: Stephen Boyd; Colleen Dewhurst; Cyril Cusack; Dominic Guard; Enid Lorimer
- Countries of origin: Australia; United States
- Original language: English

Production
- Producer: Fred L Engel
- Cinematography: John R. McLean
- Editor: Mervin Lloyd
- Running time: 72 mins
- Production companies: Crawford Productions; Hallmark Hall of Fame

Original release
- Release: 1972

The Hands of Cormac Joyce is a 1972 made-for-television movie (Hallmark Hall of Fame) directed by Fielder Cook. It is also the third film to be based on a novel by Leonard Wibberley, after The Mouse That Roared and The Mouse on the Moon.

== Plot ==
A proud fisherman off the Irish Coast fights to save his land from an approaching storm as other villagers evacuate to the mainland.

== Cast ==
- Stephen Boyd as Cormac Joyce
- Colleen Dewhurst as Molly Joyce
- Dominic Guard as Jackie Joyce
- Deryck Barnes as Pat Coneeley
- Cyril Cusack as Mr. Reece
- Enid Lorimer as Mrs. Reece
- Lynette Floyd as Elis Coneeley
- Marshall Crosby as Tigue Coneeley

== Production ==
The film was a U.S.-Australian co-production. It was shot in Australia with Phillip Island substituting for Aran Island. Many of the crew had worked on the TV show Homicide, but some of them had to be replaced during the shoot as it was realised they did not have the experience to make a 35mm film shot on location.
