= Julian Brodetsky =

Russian-American violinist

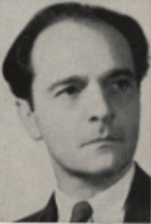
- Brodetsky, circa 1940
- Born: February 27, 1893; Russian Empire
- Died: March 31, 1962 (aged 69); Los Angeles, California, U.S.
- Education: Leopold Auer, Petrograd Conservatory
- Occupations: Violinist; Conductor; Teacher
- Spouses: Muriel Stuart (m. 1926, divorced); Anna May Nolan (m. 1937)

Julian Brodetsky (27 February 1893 – 31 March 1962) was a Russian-American violinist, conductor, and music educator. He held high-profile positions in his native Russia and later in Germany, before emigrating to the United States, where he spent the majority of his career. He founded and led The Brodetsky Chamber Music Ensemble in Los Angeles from 1939–53. He was an associate of Anna Pavlova, Andrés Segovia, Igor Stravinsky, Alexandre Tansman, and Ernst Toch. He is the subject of the 1963 book by Leonard Wibberley, Ah, Julian! A Memoir of Julian Brodetsky.

== Education and early life ==
Julian Brodetsky's grandfather, Leonti Brodetsky, was a conductor and graduate of the Warsaw Conservatory of Music. Julian Brodetsky studied under Leopold Auer at the Petrograd Conservatory (later known as the Saint Petersburg Conservatory of Music), graduating in 1916 with a degree of Laureate.

== Career in Europe ==
Brodetsky served as concertmaster at the Imperial (State Grand Opera Theatre), Moscow. He fled Moscow for Riga, Latvia after the Russian Revolution. He taught chamber music at Conservatory of Riga and was a member of the Beuler String Quartet, Koln, Germany.

== Career in the US ==
=== New York and the Pavlova Company ===
Brodetsky emigrated to America in 1923. He initially found work in New York playing violin in a pit orchestra accompanying silent films in a small movie theater. He subsequently joined the orchestra that accompanied ballerina Anna Pavlova's company on tour.

=== Major orchestras in California ===
Brodetsky left the Pavlova Company to join the San Francisco Symphony Orchestra as assistant concert master under Alfred Hertz. He later joined the Los Angeles Philharmonic Orchestra as first violinist under Artur Rodzinski.

=== Work in Hollywood ===
Brodetsky transitioned to film studio work and joined the Columbia Studios Orchestra as a violinist. He performed in the orchestra that recorded Dimitri Tiomkin's score for the 1938 Metro-Goldwyn-Mayer film The Great Waltz. He coached actor William Holden on playing violin for his role in the 1939 film Golden Boy. Brodetsky also played in the ensemble that accompanied Frank Sinatra in the recording of the 1957 film Pal Joey.

=== The Brodetsky Chamber Music Ensemble ===
In Los Angeles in 1938, he founded The Brodetsky Chamber Music Ensemble, a "multiple quartet" of as many as 32 young string players. The ensemble performed in Los Angeles with Alexandre Tansman and Mario Castelnuovo-Tedesco. Written correspondence shows the ensemble performed new compositions by Igor Stravinsky in 1942. The ensemble was active until 1953.

== Personal and family life ==
Brodetsky met his first wife, the English dancer Muriel Stuart, while performing with the Pavlova Company's orchestra. The couple married in 1926 and later divorced. Brodetsky subsequently married American violinist Anna May Nolan in 1937.

Brodetsky was naturalized as an American citizen in 1930.

Brodetsky was Jewish. His family in Europe was killed during World War II.

Brodetsky was one of violist Myra Kestenbaum's first teachers. At the request of his friend, Igor Stravinsky, Brodetsky helped arrange for Kestenbaum's parents to host Alexandre Tansman and his wife, the pianist Colette Cras, when they first arrived in California. Tansman dedicated his String Quartet No. 6, as well as his Variations sur un theme de Frescobaldi for string orchestra (1937) to Brodetsky.

Brodetsky formed a lasting friendship with classical guitarist Andres Segovia after he referred him to Los Angeles luthier Abram Koodlach to make emergency repairs on his guitar after it was damaged in transit while touring.

Brodetsky was the subject of the 1963 memoir, Ah, Julian! A Memoir of Julian Brodetsky by Leonard Wibberley, author of The Mouse that Roared. Brodetsky was Wibberley's violin teacher from 1955-1962 and formed a close friendship with the writer. Wibberley published his memoir shortly after Brodetsky's death in 1962. The character of the violin teacher, Mr. Olinsky, in Wibberley's 25 March 1961 Saturday Evening Post short story "The Captive Outfielder" (later republished as "Bach at Home Plate" in Wibberley's 1967 collection, Something to Read) is loosely based on Brodetsky. Wibberley dedicated his 1961 novel Stranger at Killknock to Brodetsky.

== Sources ==
- Wibberley, Leonard (1963). Ah, Julian! A Memoir of Julian Brodetsky. New York: I. Washburn.
- Rodriguez, José, ed. (1940) Music and Dance in California. Hollywood, California: Bureau of Musical Research. p. 323.
- Lawrence Morton (August 1941). "Youth and Music," California Arts & Architecture. United States: J.D. Entenza. pp. 16-17, 42.
- Slim, H. Colin (2019). Stravinsky in the Americas: Transatlantic Tours and Domestic Excursions from Wartime Los Angeles (1925-1945). Univ of California Press, pp. 228-230.
- H. Colin Slim Stravinsky Collection (2002). Annotated Catalogue of the H. Colin Slim Collection. Vancouver: University of British Columbia Library, pp. 235-241.
