= Muriel Stuart =

Muriel Stuart may refer to:

- Muriel Stuart (poet)
- Muriel Stuart (dancer)
