= Mike Hunt =

Mike or Michael Hunt may refer to:

- Michael Hunt (actor) (1930–2022), British actor
- Mike Hunt (American football) (born 1956), American football linebacker
- Mike Hunt (baseball) (1907–1996), American baseball player
- Michael John Hunt (born 1941), English figurative painter and etcher
- Mike Hunt (gag name), used in film and other media

== See also ==
- Michael Hunter (disambiguation)
