= Dickhead =

Dickhead may refer to:

- The glans penis, the tip of a human penis ("dick" in slang)
- A pejorative term for a jerk or stupid person

Dickhead or dick head may also refer to:

- Dickheads (brand), an Australian brand of matches
- Dick Head (footballer) (1887–1940), Australian rules football player
- "Dickhead", song by Robbie Williams from the 2006 album Rudebox
- "Dickhead", song by Kate Nash from the 2007 album Made of Bricks

== See also ==
- Richard Head (disambiguation), "Dick" being a diminutive for Richard
