= Tube Bar prank calls =

Series of prank calls made in the 1970s

An illustration of the Tube Bar.

The Tube Bar prank calls are a series of prank calls made from 1975 until 1977 or 1978 to the Tube Bar in Jersey City, New Jersey, in which Jim Davidson and John Elmo would ask "Red", the proprietor of the bar, if they could speak to various non-existent customers. The gag names given by the pranksters were puns and homophones for often offensive phrases. Recordings of the calls were circulated widely on duplicated cassette tapes and were the inspiration for a long-running gag in The Simpsons.

== History ==
In 1975, two young men – Jim Davidson and John Elmo, later known collectively as the Bum Bar Bastards, or the BBB – began calling the Tube Bar, located at Journal Square in Jersey City, New Jersey. The bar was owned by heavyweight boxer Louis "Red" Deutsch, and most of the time Red himself answered the calls. During a call, the pranksters would ask Red to call out fictitious, pun-like or homophonous names such as "Pepe Roni" (pepperoni), "Hal Jalykakik" (how'd you like a kick), "Phil Mypockets" (fill my pockets), "Al Coholic" (alcoholic) or "Mike Hunt" (my cunt). Most of the time, Red would call out the names, unaware that he was being subjected to a prank.

At times, Red would catch on, and when he did, he would respond with extreme hostility, shouting profanity, obscene sexual references (usually involving the caller's mother), and threats of physical harm at the caller. He would utter threats such as, "I'll break dem bones on you, on your feet, you'll never be able to walk for the rest of your life!" as well as "I'll cut your belly open and show you all the black stuff you got in there!" Sometimes Red would offer the two pranksters a reward of $100 or $500 if they would show up at his bar in person, but they never took him up on the offer, in one case even counter-offering him $5.

By the 1980s, dubbed cassette tapes of the calls were shared between staff of several major league sports teams such as the New York Mets, Los Angeles Dodgers and Miami Dolphins. These dubbed copies of the calls were unofficially referred to as the Red Tapes or Tube Bar Tapes. The popularity of these prank calls spread throughout respective sports leagues, branching out to sports reporters and then into the larger media world.

== Bar location and details ==
The Tube Bar itself was located at 12 Tube Concourse, Jersey City, adjacent to the entrance of the Journal Square PATH station and across the way from the Landmark Loew's Jersey Theatre. The small complex of commercial storefronts that included the Tube Bar was demolished in early 2009 to make way for the 1 Journal Square development project.

== Legacy ==
- Animator and cartoonist Matt Groening has described himself as a fan of the tapes, particularly the "Garden Grove calls". His series The Simpsons features a running joke of Bart Simpson making prank calls to barkeeper Moe Szyslak, asking to speak to patrons with joke names. Groening describes the similarity between these jokes and the Tube Bar calls as "creative synchronicity." Co-developer Sam Simon told The Howard Stern Show in 2007 that the jokes are a "homage to or parody of the classic Red tapes".
- During the 1980s, several different record labels released various edits of the tapes on CD, LP and cassette tape before the Bum Bar Bastards came forward in the 1990s to claim copyright of the tapes and officially release their version.
- In the 1990s, on The Howard Stern Show, Billy West would often imitate Red, usually after Stern would ask Billy a question, but referring to him as "Red."

== Discography ==
Tube Bar album releases
#	Album	Format	Release date	Label	Catalog Number
1	The Tube Bar	Cassette Tape	6 November 1988	TeenBeat Records	Teen-Beat 22
2	The Tube Bar	LP	15 February 1990	TeenBeat Records	Teen-Beat 31
3	The Tube Bar	CD	23 September 1991	TeenBeat Records	Teen-Beat 81
4	Tube Bar	CD	1993	Detonator Records	30414-2
5	Tavern Tour	Cassette Tape & CD	1997	Padded Cell Productions	bbb1111
6	Tube Bar Collector's Edition	CD	2006	T.A. Productions	634479238611
7	Drunk, Dirty And Disgraceful	CD	30 October 2006	T.A. Productions	634479416163
8	Tube Bar Red's Bootleg Tape [Remastered]	CD	1 September 2007	T.A. Productions	883629285993
9	Tube Bar Legendary Prank / Crank Calls [The Ultimate Collection]	CD	23 October 2008	T.A. Productions	883629648101
10	Tube Bar Prank Calls 35th Anniversary Complete Collection	CD	1 September 2010	T.A. Productions	885444445392
11	Tube Bar Vol. 4: Rummies, Bums & Dummies	CD	17 April 2013		887936261862

== See also ==
- List of practical joke topics
- Roy D. Mercer
- The Jerky Boys
- Touch-Tone Terrorists
- Longmont Potion Castle
