= Michael Hunter =

Michael or Mike Hunter may refer to:

- Michael Hunter (historian) (born 1949), professor of history at Birkbeck, University of London
- Michael Hunter (composer), Scottish composer of sounds for Grand Theft Auto
- Michael Wayne Hunter (born 1958), San Quentin prisoner/writer
- Michael Hunter (boxer) (born 1978), English bantamweight
- Michael Hunter (politician) (1891–1951), Member of Parliament for Brigg, 1931–1935
- Mike Hunter (boxer) (1959–2006), American clubfighter
- Michael Hunter (American boxer) (born 1988), his son, American superheavyweight champ 2007
- Mike Hunter (politician) (born 1947), Canadian politician
- Mike Hunter (footballer) (born 1948), English football forward with Darlington and in Ireland with Sligo Rovers
- Mike Hunter (soccer) (born 1958), retired U.S. soccer defender
- Michael J. Hunter (born 1956), Oklahoma politician
- Michael Hunter (American football) (born 1993), American football player
- Michael Hunter (forensic pathologist), forensic pathologist and host of TV series Autopsy: The Last Hours of...
- Michael Hunter (rugby union), Scottish rugby union player
