= Walter Shenson =

American film producer (1919–2000)

- Born: June 22, 1919
- Died: October 17, 2000
- Occupation: Producer

Walter Shenson (June 22, 1919 – October 17, 2000) was an American film producer, director and writer, best known for producing the Beatles' films A Hard Day's Night (1964) and Help! (1965), as well as the 1959 comedy The Mouse That Roared, starring Peter Sellers.

== Biography ==
Born in San Francisco, California in 1919, he attended Stanford University., and later joined the United States Army for two years during World War II. His wife, Geraldine, died in 1999. Shenson also had a sister, two sons and four grandchildren.

== Filmography ==
During his career, he produced the following films:

| Name | Year | Country |
|---|---|---|
| Korea Patrol | 1951 | US |
| The Mouse That Roared | 1959 | UK |
| A Matter Of WHO | 1961 | UK |
| The Mouse on the Moon | 1963 | UK |
| A Hard Day's Night | 1964 | UK |
| Help! | 1965 | UK |
| Don't Raise the Bridge, Lower the River | 1968 | UK |
| 30 Is a Dangerous Age, Cynthia | 1968 | UK |
| A Talent For Loving | 1969 | US |
| Welcome To The Club | 1971 | US |
| Digby, the Biggest Dog in The World | 1973 | UK |
| Reuben, Reuben | 1983 | US |
| Ruby Jean and Joe | 1996 | US |

== Death and legacy ==
Shenson died on October 17, 2000. He was remembered by the Los Angeles Times as "a motion picture producer whose best-known movies were the Beatles pictures “A Hard Day’s Night” and “Help!"
