= Sung-ki =

- Hangul: 성기
- RR: Seonggi
- MR: Sŏnggi

Sung-ki or Sseong-gi is a Korean given name. It was the ninth-most-popular name for newborn boys in 1940, according to South Korean government data.

The name is not commonly given to babies with the family name Nam, as the resulting name "Nam Sung-ki" (남성기) is a homograph and homophone of the Korean word for penis. The 2005 Seoul Broadcasting System television series Hello My Teacher was criticised for its inclusion of a character with the gag name Nam Sung-ki, for this reason; some commentators believed this penis joke was inappropriate for television.

People with this name include:

- Ahn Sung-ki (born 1952), South Korean actor
- Cho Sung-ki (born 1951), South Korean writer
- Jung Sung-ki (born 1971), South Korean baseball player
- Yoo Seong-gi (born 1991), South Korean football player

== See also ==
- List of Korean given names
