= Myra Kinch =

American actress

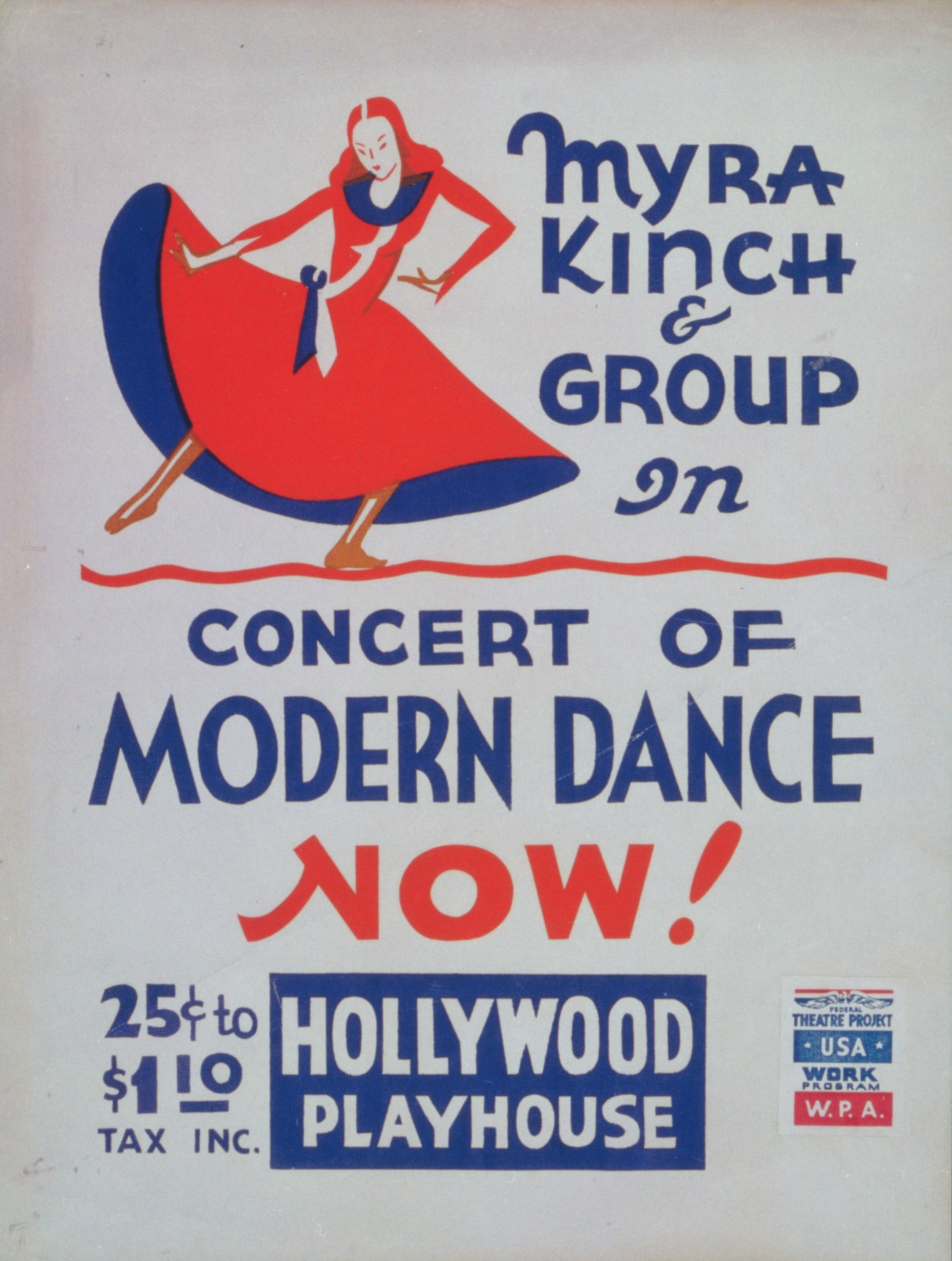
Poster for Federal Theatre Project presentation of "Myra Kinch and Group" in a concert of modern dance at the Hollywood Playhouse, between 1936 and 1941

Myra Kinch (1904 - November 20, 1981) was a choreographer and dancer who appeared in several Hollywood motion pictures. She was from Los Angeles, California. Her eyes were blue and her hair was a dark red.

== Education ==
She was a UCLA graduate. Kinch trained with the ethnologist La Meri and the ballet teachers Muriel Stuart, Eugenie Eduardova, and Vincenzo Celli.

== Dancer ==
In March 1928 the interpretive dancer appeared in a program presented by the University Club of the San Fernando Valley. The event took place at the Hotel Porter in Los Angeles. Kinch was a former classmate of many of those in the fifty member organization. Representing the Pasadena Playhouse, she danced a number of gypsy and oriental numbers.

The following year Kinch was in a musical revue at the Lazarus Million Dollar Theater with singer Buddy Garry and a chorus of showgirls. By then she was a seasoned dancer who had worked with George White's Scandals in New York City.

Kinch's first solo performance came while abroad in Germany, at the Max Reinhardt theater in Berlin. She returned to America to star at the New Open Air Theater in Los Angeles. She performed there at the time of the 1932 Summer Olympics. Kinch had a second solo engagement at the Politeama Theater in Mexico City.

== Screen diversion ==
Her screen credits are sparse, numbering only three. Kinch debuted in films with an uncredited role in the comedy short The Beach Club (1928). Likewise she was uncredited in the part of a dancer in the Oscar-winning The Lives of a Bengal Lancer (1935). In between she was a laughing singer in Redskin (1929).

== New Deal project ==
Kinch returned to the United States to become director and choreographer of the West Coast Dance Project of the Federal Theater Project. Later she was choreographer for the opera department of the Federal Music Project.

In 1948 Kinch was named head of the modern dance department at the Jacob's Pillow dance school and summer festival in Becket, Massachusetts. She remained in this position for twenty-five years.

== Later career ==
In January 1963 Kinch and her dance company performed at the Newport, Rhode Island Civic Music Association. Her dance repertoire was composed of satire and spoofs. She lampooned diverse subjects like bullfighting, a weary circus dancer, a family of acrobats, and stereotypes of classic ballet.

Kinch performed through the 1960s. She regularly toured with dancer Ralph McWilliams and composer-pianist Manuel Galea. Galea became her husband.

Kinch was praised as one of the brightest and most imaginative of American dancers. Critics admired her ultramodern and daring routines. Among her popular parodies were Tomb For Two, Bolero For A Bad Bull, A Waltz Is A Waltz Is A Waltz, and Giselle's Revenge. The latter was a well researched rendition of the excesses of Giselle, the Romanticism period ballet.

Among the more candid works she choreographed were two popular dances for Ted Shawn, modern dance innovator and founder of Jacob's Pillow. In The Bajour Shawn played a gypsy king. He also had the lead in her Sundered Majesty, which was based on King Lear.

== Death ==
Myra Kinch died in Bonita Springs, Florida in 1981. She was 77. She was survived by her husband.

== Sources ==
- Los Angeles Times, Dances Before University Club, March 1, 1928, Page 8.
- Los Angeles Times, Valley Varsity Club Entertains, March 16, 1928, Page 15.
- Los Angeles Times, Lazarus Stages Musical Revue, August 21, 1929, Page A15.
- Los Angeles Times, Dancer Poked Fun At Classics She Performed, November 30, 1981, Page C8.
- Lowell, Massachusetts Sun, Foreign Nations Who Once Sent Stars To United States Now Import And Applaud American Performers, August 15, 1932, Page 8.
- Newport Daily News, Civic To See Dance Satirist, January 10, 1963, Page 18.
- New York Times, Myra Kinch, 77, Choreographer, November 24, 1981, Page B17.
