= Grand Fenwick =

Fictional country

- The Mouse That Roared location
- Flag
- Created by: Leonard Wibberley
- Genre: Satire

In-universe information
- Other name: Duchy of Grand Fenwick
- Type: Duchy
- Ethnic group: Fenwickians
- Locations: Fenwick (capital)
- Population: 6,000 (estimated)
- Language(s): English
- Currency: Fenwickian Pound

The Duchy of Grand Fenwick is a tiny fictional country created by Leonard Wibberley in a series of comedic novels beginning with The Mouse That Roared (1955), which was made into a 1959 film.

In the novels, Wibberley goes beyond the merely comic, placing the tiny nation (15 square miles/39 square kilometres) in absurd situations so as to comment satirically on contemporary politics and events.

== History and topography ==
The Duchy of Grand Fenwick is described as no more than five miles (8 km) long and three miles (5 km) wide and lies in a fold in the Northern Alps in Central Europe. The imaginary country features three valleys, a river, and a mountain with an elevation of 2,000 feet (610 m).

The Duchy, ruled by the Duchess Gloriana XII, is described as bordering Switzerland and France in the Alps. Internal evidence points to the Duchy being in the Franche-Comté region in eastern France, near (or on top of) Les Gras.

On the northern slopes are 400 acres (160 ha) of vineyards. The hillsides where the ground is less fertile support flocks of sheep that provide meat, dairy products, and wool.

Most of the inhabitants live in the City of Fenwick, which is clustered around Fenwick Castle, the seat of government. The city of Fenwick is also home to the only bar/inn/restaurant in the country, the Gray Goose Pub.

About 2 miles (3 km) from the City of Fenwick is a 500 acres (200 ha) Forest Preserve that features a 20-foot (6.1 m) waterfall and attracts many birds that the nation claims as its own native birds. There is a tiny monastery on the border of the forest which also houses the school.

The Duchy takes its name from its founder, the English knight Sir Roger Fenwick who, while employed by France, settled there with his followers in 1370. Thanks to Sir Roger, the national language is English.

It retains a pre-industrial economy, based almost entirely on clipping wool and pressing Pinot Grand Fenwick wine. However, in the fourth book of the Mouse series, there are two cars in Grand Fenwick, a 1947 Daimler belonging to the Duchess Gloriana, and the other, a 1927 Rolls-Royce Silver Ghost, belonging to the Count of Mountjoy. There is only one petrol station, which is also the bicycle shop. Aside from these examples, there is no modern technology in the Duchy. The Duchy has a postal service, although mail going outside the Duchy has to be sent to Monaco.

== Government ==
The Duchy of Grand Fenwick is a monarchy led by the Duchess Gloriana XII. In the novel The Mouse That Roared, she is a young woman of 22, and marries Tully Bascomb. In The Mouse on the Moon and The Mouse on Wall Street, she is in her mid-thirties. In The Mouse That Saved the West, she is 42, and Tully has been dead for some time. In the 1959 film version, she is a parody of Queen Victoria who is still wearing mourning for her husband, Prince Louis of Bosnia-Herzegovina, who has been "missing" from a tiger hunt for 27 years. In the film, she thinks the President of the United States is Calvin Coolidge, and she owns the only motorcar in the Duchy–a 1920s hand-cranked model. This is not so in the original books. It is not known whether she has any children.

The lower House of the Duchy's Parliament, the Council of Freemen, is democratically elected. In The Mouse on Wall Street an upper House of Parliament, akin to the House of Lords in the United Kingdom, is mentioned to exist.

The nation has two political parties, the Dilutionists (or Her Grace's Loyal Opposition), led by David Bentner, and the Anti-Dilutionists, led by Count Mountjoy, the Prime Minister. The names of the parties reflect their positions on whether to dilute the wine exports of the Duchy. The positions of leadership are hereditary. In The Mouse on Wall Street, the Dilutionists are also referred to as the Labor Party.

== National flag ==
Coat of arms of Grand Fenwick (uses the same design as the flag)

A double-headed eagle saying "Aye" from one beak and "Nay" from the other. Sir Roger recorded that he only learned three things in his two years at Oxford University:

1. That "Aye" might be turned into "Nay" and vice versa if a sufficient quantity of wordage was applied to the matter.
2. In any argument the victor is always right.
3. Though the pen is mightier than the sword, the sword speaks louder and stronger at any given moment.

== Defence forces ==
The Grand Fenwick Expeditionary Force consists of 20 bowmen selected from 700 in the Duchy and three men-at-arms selected from 20 who have the right to carry spear and mace. They are clad in mail and armed with longbows. They are led by Forester Tully Bascomb, appointed High Constable, and Serjeant-at-Arms Will Buckley (who had World War II experience with the British Army).

In Beware of the Mouse it is stated that Grand Fenwick's constitution is amended to state that no weapon more modern than the longbow will be used by the nation's army. The longbow is a vital part of the country's history, its borders originally determined by the distance a platoon of bowmen could shoot in each direction. (In real life at the time, the extent of a country's territorial waters were defined by the three-mile limit, which is traditionally thought to be based on the effective range of a cannon fired from coastal land toward the sea.)

In the film The Mouse on the Moon, Grand Fenwick is shown to have a small military force dressed similar to the Brigade of Guards and armed with rifles.

== The novels ==
In The Mouse That Roared (1955), the Duchy seeks to stop American counterfeiting of Pinot Grand Fenwick. Grand Fenwick's formal protests are ignored by U.S. State Department employees, who think the documents are pranks. Grand Fenwick then plans an attack on the United States, certain this will lead to immediate defeat followed by generous American aid. The Grand Fenwick Expeditionary Force lands when the streets of New York City are deserted during a nuclear attack drill. Ultimately, they take prisoners and return to Grand Fenwick. One captive is the inventor of the Q-bomb, and the Duchy finds itself the possessor of the only working model of this devastating weapon. Grand Fenwick forms an alliance of small nations, the Tiny Twenty, and uses its control of the bomb to obtain world peace.

Beware of the Mouse (1958) is set in the Middle Ages and explains the historical origin of Grand Fenwick.

In The Mouse on the Moon (1962), Grand Fenwick beats the U.S. and the Soviet Union in a space race by using a new rocket fuel, the secret ingredient for which is found in a "premier grand cru" crop of Pinot Grand Fenwick.

In The Mouse on Wall Street (1969), the Duchy disrupts the world's finances. In an attempt to dispose of a sizable royalty payment from an American chewing gum company by investing it in failing companies, Duchess Gloriana finds she has the Midas touch for the stock market, and in a flurry of rumor and assumption, the Duchy becomes a financial superpower.

In The Mouse that Saved the West (1981), it is discovered that the Duchy is sitting on the largest oil deposit in the world.

== Other appearances ==
A 1966 television pilot featuring Sid Caesar in the same roles Peter Sellers performed in the movie (namely the head of state Duchess Gloriana XII, Prime Minister and Count Rupert Mountjoy and the military leader Tully Bascomb) was filmed but never picked up as a series.

Grand Fenwick is mentioned in The New Traveller's Almanac, part of the series The League of Extraordinary Gentlemen.

In the comic Aetheric Mechanics, Grand Fenwick is stated to have been annexed by Ruritania.

In the novel Sunnyside, Grand Fenwick is said to have declared war on Germany during World War I.

Grand Fenwick is used in Project Euler to create the context of problem 314.

In the shared alternate history of Ill Bethisad (1997 and after), Grand Fenwick is an actual country located between France and Helvetia (this world's version of Switzerland). Within Ill Bethisad, it is the smallest country in the world, being only 15 sq mi (39 km^{2}) in size.

The Royal Archduke of Grand Fenwick is a scheme used by Barney Stinson to seduce an art expert in the How I Met Your Mother episode "The Ashtray".

== Film adaptations ==
- The Mouse That Roared
- The Mouse on the Moon
