= Northern Alps =

Northern Alps may be:

- the Alps north of the Periadriatic Seam
- the Alps north of the Main chain of the Alps
- Northern Limestone Alps
- Hida Mountains, Japan
