= Leonard Wibberley =

Irish-American author (1915–1983)

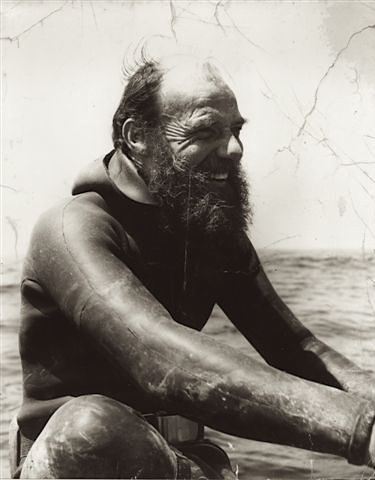
- Leonard Wibberley, sailor
- Born: Leonard Patrick O'Connor Wibberley; 9 April 1915; Dublin, County Dublin, Ireland
- Died: 22 November 1983 (aged 68); Santa Monica, California, United States
- Occupations: Writer, author
- Spouse: Olga Maynard (1938-1946) Katherine Hazel Holton (1948-death)
- Children: Patrick Maynard, Kevin Wibberley, Patricia Sheehey, Christopher Wibberley (d), Arabella Birkholm, Rory Wibberley (d) and Cormac Wibberley
- Writing career
- Pen name: Patrick O'Connor; Leonard Holton; Christopher Webb
- Genres: Fiction, non-fiction, satire

Leonard Patrick O'Connor Wibberley (9 April 1915 – 22 November 1983), who also published under the name Patrick O'Connor, among others, was an Irish author who spent most of his life in the United States. Wibberley, who published more than 100 books, is perhaps best known for five satirical novels about an imaginary country Grand Fenwick, particularly The Mouse That Roared (1955).

Wibberley's adult and juvenile publications cut across the categories of fictional novels, history, and biography. He also wrote short stories (several published in The Saturday Evening Post), plays and long verse poems. Some of his books are in series. Besides the 'Mouse' series, as Leonard Holton, he created the 11-novel 'Father Bredder' mystery series (basis of the television series Sarge) about "a major figure in the clerical crime drama". Among his more than 50 juvenile books are (with Farrar, Straus and Giroux), a seven-volume 'Treegate' series of historical fiction and a four-volume life of Thomas Jefferson. As Patrick O'Connor, he wrote the 'Black Tiger' series on auto racing for young adults. Wibberley also is classified as a science fiction writer.

Throughout the decades, scenes and senses of the sea play important parts in both Wibberley's fiction and nonfiction.

Three of his novels have been made into movies: The Mouse That Roared (1959), The Mouse on the Moon (1963), and The Hands of Cormac Joyce (1972).

== Biography ==
In 1915, Leonard Wibberley was born in Dublin, the youngest of six children. His family moved to Cork and, until the age of eight, he was educated in the Irish language at Ring College, Waterford, Ireland. After moving to England, he attended Abbey House, Romsey, Hampshire and then Cardinal Vaughan's Memorial School in London. His father, Thomas Wibberley, FRSA, Professor of Agricultural Research, University College, Cork (one of the three constituents of the National University of Ireland) and Queen's University Belfast, was an experimental agronomist. He wrote several books contending his methods and inventions would allow the UK, absent empire, to feed itself (see Farming on Factory Lines: continuous cropping for the large farmer [London, 1919]). In 1921, the elder Wibberley was made a Fellow of the Linnean Society. Leonard's second name, "Patrick", was his confirmation name; his third, which he used as one of several pen names, was his matronymic, from his school-teacher mother, Sinaid O'Connor.

On his father's sudden death at age fifty in 1930, leaving a widow and six children, Wibberley was obliged to leave school and began a long career in newspapers, in London, as copy boy for the Sunday Dispatch (1931–32), then reporter for the Sunday Express (1932–34) and Daily Mirror (London, 1934–36), and was also assistant London editor for the Malayan Straits Times and the Singapore Free Press. He then emigrated to Trinidad, where he held several jobs, first, briefly, as editor of the Trinidad Evening News (1936), thereafter as an oilfield worker for Trinidad Leaseholds Ltd (1936–43), before immigrating to New York City in 1943. There he was initially employed by Walsh Kaiser Shipyards, but soon found important jobs in journalism again, as Cable Dispatch Editor for the Associated Press (New York City) during the war years of 1943–44 and New York Correspondent and Bureau Chief for the London Evening News (1944–46).

In 1947 Wibberley moved permanently to California, working in newspapers, first (1947) as city editor of the Turlock Daily Journal, then as editor of the Independent Journal, San Rafael (1947–1949), next as copy editor then reporter, for the Los Angeles Times (1950–1954). While working for the Times he began his novel-writing career. At age 37, he published his first novel,The King's Beard (1952). Leaving the newspaper business, he settled permanently in Hermosa Beach, California, as a full-time author, publishing 100 more books, at a rate of at least one a year and averaging more than three. Many were with three publishers: Farrar, Straus and Giroux; William Morrow; Dodd, Mead and Company. The best-known of Wibberley's books, The Mouse that Roared, was kept in print for some time by Bantam Books and then Four Walls Eight Windows. Fifty of his book publications are available as e-books.

== Personal life ==
Wibberley took part in plays, did local radio readings and wrote a weekly syndicated column for the San Francisco Chronicle, 'The Wibberley Papers'. His writing activities included unpublished and uncompleted projects, such as an unfinished 1958 collaboration with his friend Rosalind Russell on a musical script adaptation from his McGillicuddy McGotham, titled "Little Mac."

A lifelong amateur violin player, Wibberley published three violin-themed books: a memoir, Ah, Julian!: A Memoir of Julian Brodetsky (1963) about his violin teacher, Julian Brodetsky; a detective novel in his Father Bredder series (as Leonard Holton), A Problem in Angels (1970); and a young adult novel, Guarneri: Story of a Genius (1974), a fictionalized account of the life of the great 18th-Century Cremona luthier, Guiseppe Guarneri.

His two marriages, in Trinidad with Olga Morton-Gittens, and in California with Katherine Hazel Holton, produced seven children, including film writer Cormac Wibberley; six of the children were with Holton.

== Death ==
Wibberley died of a heart attack in Santa Monica, California, aged 68, on 22 November 1983.

== Legacy ==
Wibberley donated manuscripts and proofs of many of his works to The Leonard Wibberley Archive of the library collections of the University of Southern California, where they are available, but not online. An online listing, titled "Finding Aid of the Leonard Wibberley papers 0172", has appeared at "The Online Archive of California".

In 1993, Borgo Press published a posthumous book of his last short writings.

== Published adult writing ==
=== Short stories, novellas ===
==== The Saturday Evening Post ====
- "The Day New York Was Invaded" (25 December 1954; 1, 8, 15, 22, 29 January 1955)
- "The Hands of Cormac Joyce", novelette (issue includes picture of author): 232, n 29 (16 January 1960)
- "The Time of the Lamb" 233 n 26, combined issues ( 24–31 December 1960)
- "The Captive Outfielder": 234, n 12 (25 March 1961)
- "The Ballad of the Pilgrim Cat": 234, n 44 (18 November 1961)
- "The Man Who Lived on Water": 235, n 13 (31 March 1962)
- "Prevarication Jones": 235, n 24 (2 June 1962); repr. Sept.-Oct. 1994
- "Two Angels on Duty": 235, n 28 (28 July 1962); repr. September 1996

=== The Mouse series ===
- The Mouse That Roared (The Mouse That Roared, #1). New York: William Morrow. 1955. ISBN 978-0-316-93872-3 (e-book, 2015)
- Beware of the Mouse (The Mouse That Roared, #0). New York: Borgo Press. 1958. ISBN 978-0-89370-001-0. With Cathy Hill (illustrator) (e-book, 2015)
- The Mouse on the Moon (The Mouse That Roared, #2). New York: William Morrow. 1962. ISBN 978-0-688-02121-4 (e-book, 2015)
- The Mouse on Wall Street (The Mouse That Roared, #3). New York: William Morrow. 1969. ISBN 978-0-688-02595-3 (e-book, 2015)
- The Mouse That Saved the West (The Mouse That Roared, #4). New York: William Morrow. 1981. (e-book, 2015)

=== Other novels ===
- Mrs Searwood's Secret Weapon. Boston: Little, Brown, 1954
- McGillicuddy McGotham. Boston: Little, Brown, 1956; New York: William Morrow, 1966 (e-book, 2016)
- Take Me to Your President. New York: Putnam, 1957 (e-book, 2017)
- The Quest of Excalibur. New York: Putnam, 1959 (republished as e-book Escape from Buckingham Palace, 2018)
- Stranger At Killknock. New York: Putnam, 1961 (republished in e-book Irish Tales of Faith: The Hands of Cormac Joyce & Stranger at Killknock, 2018)
- A Feast of Freedom. New York: William Morrow, 1964 (e-book, 2016)
- The Island of the Angels. New York: William Morrow, 1964
- The Centurion. New York: William Morrow, 1966 (e-book, 2015)
- The Road from Toomi. New York: William Morrow, 1967
- The Hands of Cormac Joyce. New York: William Morrow, 1967 (republished in e-book Irish Tales of Faith: The Hands of Cormac Joyce & Stranger at Killknock, 2018)
- Adventures of an Elephant Boy. New York: William Morrow, 1968 (e-book, 2017)
- Meeting with a Great Beast. New York: William Morrow, 1971 (e-book, 2018)
- Flint's Island: A sequel to 'Treasure Island' . New York: Farrar Straus Giroux, 1972 (e-book, 2015)
- The Testament of Theophilus: a novel of Christ and Caesar. New York: William Morrow, 1972 (published in paperback as The Seven Hills (Major Books, 1973) and in the U.K. as Merchant of Rome (Cassell, 1974), e-book as Body of Proof (2017))
- The Last Stand of Father Felix. New York: William Morrow, 1973 (e-book, 2018)
- 1776—and All That. New York. William Morrow, 1975
- One in Four. New York: William Morrow, 1976
- Homeward to Ithaka. New York: William Morrow, 1978

=== As Leonard Holton: Father Joseph Bredder mystery series, Dodd, Mead (New York) ===
- The Saint Maker, 1959 (e-book, 2015)
- A Pact with Satan, 1960 (e-book, 2016)
- Secret of the Doubting Saint, 1961 (e-book, 2015)
- Deliver Us from Wolves, 1963 (e-book, 2015)
- Flowers by Request, 1964 (e-book, 2015)
- Out of the Depths, 1966 (e-book, 2016)
- A Touch of Jonah, 1968 (e-book, 2016)
- A Problem in Angels, 1970 (e-book, 2016)
- The Mirror of Hell, 1972 (e-book, 2017)
- The Devil to Play, 1974 (e-book, 2017)
- A Corner of Paradise, 1977 (e-book, 2017)

=== Non-fiction ===
- The Trouble with the Irish (or the English, Depending on Your Point of View). New York: Henry Holt, 1956 (e-book, 2020)
- The Coming of the Green. New York: Henry Holt, 1958
- No Garlic in the Soup!: A Portuguese Adventure. New York: Ives Washburn, 1959
- The Land That Isn't There: An Irish Adventure. New York: Ives Washburn, 1960
- Yesterday's Land: A Baja California Adventure. New York: Ives Washburn, 1961
- Zebulon Pike: Soldier and Explorer. New York: Funk & Wagnalls, 1961
- Ventures into the Deep. New York: Ives Washburn, 1962
- Ah, Julian!: A Memoir of Julian Brodetsky. New York: Ives Washburn, 1963; New York: William Morrow, 1969 (reprint of Ives Washburn 1963 edition); San Bernardino, CA: Borgo Press, 1988 (reprint, hardcover ISBN 0-89370-341-9 and paperback ISBN 0-89370-441-5 editions)
- Fiji: Islands of the Dawn. New York: Ives Washburn, 1964
- Toward a Distant Island: A Sailor's Odyssey. New York: Ives Washburn, 1966
- Hound of the Sea: The Story of a Racing Yacht. New York: Ives Washburn, 1969
- Voyage by Bus: Seeing America by Land Yacht. New York: William Morrow, 1971
- The Shannon Sailors: A Voyage to the Heart of Ireland. New York: William Morrow, 1972
- The Good-Natured Man: A Portrait of Oliver Goldsmith. New York: William Morrow, 1979

== Published youth (juvenile) writing ==
=== As Christopher Webb, with Funk & Wagnalls, New York ===
- Mark Toyman's Inheritance, 1960
- The River of Pee Dee Jack, 1962
- Quest of the Otter, 1963
- Matt Tyler's Chronicle, 1966
- The "Ann and Hope" Mutiny, 1966
- Eusebius the Phoenician, 1969 (republished in e-book The Phoenician and the Lost Vikings of the Round Table, 2023)

=== As Patrick O'Connor ===
==== Black Tiger series, E.M. Hale (Eau Claire, Wisc.) ====
- The Black Tiger, 1956 (e-book, 2018)
- Mexican Road Race, 1957 (e-book, 2018)
- Black Tiger at Le Mans, 1958 (e-book, 2018)
- Black Tiger at Bonneville, 1960 (e-book, 2018)
- Black Tiger at Indianapolis, 1962 (e-book, 2018)
- A Car Called Camellia, 1970 (e-book, 2018)

==== Ives Washburn (New York) ====
- The Society of Foxes (illus. Clyde N. Geary), 1954
- Flight of the Peacock, 1954
- The Watermelon Mystery, 1955
- Gunpowder for Washington, 1956
- The Lost Harpooner, 1957
- The Five-Dollar Watch Mystery, 1959
- Treasure at Twenty Fathoms, 1961
- The Raising of the Dubhe, 1964
- Seawind from Hawaii, 1965
- South Swell, 1967
- Beyond Hawaii, 1969

=== Farrar, Straus & Giroux Ariel youth books ===
- The King's Beard, 1952 (before FS & G bought Ariel, e-book, 2018)
- The Secret of the Hawk, 1953 (e-book, 2018)
- Deadmen's Cave, 1954 (e-book, 2018)
- The Wound of Peter Wayne, 1955
- Kevin O'Connor and the Light Brigade, 1957
- Encounter Near Venus, 1967
- Attar of the Ice Valley, 1968
- Journey to Untor, 1970
- Guarneri: Story of a Genius, 1974. (Published in UK as Guarneri: Violin-maker of Genius, London: Macdonald and Jane's, 1976)
- Perilous Gold, 1978
- The Crime of Martin Coverly, 1980 (republished in e-book On Cursed Tides of Time, 2019)

==== John Treegate series (originally four) ====
- John Treegate's Musket, 1959 (e-book, 2017)
- Peter Treegate's War, 1960 (e-book, 2013)
- Sea Captain from Salem, 1961 (e-book, 2010)
- Treegate's Raiders, 1962 (e-book, 2017)
- Leopard's Prey, 1971 (included in e-book The Complete Treegate Adventures: From the Birth of the Revolutionary War to the War of 1812, 2018)
- Red Pawns, 1973 (included in e-book The Complete Treegate Adventures: From the Birth of the Revolutionary War to the War of 1812, 2018)
- The Last Battle, 1976 (included in e-book The Complete Treegate Adventures: From the Birth of the Revolutionary War to the War of 1812, 2018)

==== Non-fictional F S & G books ====
- The Coronation Book: The dramatic story in its history and legend. Ariel, 1953 (e-book, 2022)
- The Epics of Everest, 1955
- The Life of Winston Churchill, 1956 (e-book, 2020)
- John Barry—Father of the Navy, 1957
- Wes Powell—Conqueror of the Colorado, 1958

==== Life of Thomas Jefferson historical novels ====
- Young Man from the Piedmont: The Youth of Thomas Jefferson (1963)
- A Dawn in the Trees: Thomas Jefferson, the Years 1776–1789 (1964)
- The Gales of Spring: Thomas Jefferson, the Years 1789–1801 (1965)
- Time of the Harvest: Thomas Jefferson, the Years 1801–1826 (1966)

=== Other juvenile fiction ===
- Little League Family. New York: Doubleday, 1978

== Collected short works ==
- Something to Read: A personal selection from his writing by this thoughtful, humorous man. New York: Ives Washburn, 1959 (e-book 2020)

== Plays and long verse pieces ==
- Once, in a Garden: A dramatic full length play. Chicago: Dramatic Publishing Co., 1975. OCLC 1992292.
- 1776—and All That. New York: Morrow, 1975. ISBN 978-0-688-02969-2.
- Black Jack Rides Again. Chicago: Dramatic Publishing Co., 1971. OCLC 1357916.
- The Gift of a Star, 1969. OCLC 9675960.
- The Heavenly Quarterback, 1967. OCLC 5887290.
- The Mouse on Mars, 1972. ISBN 978-0-87129-104-2.
- The Mouse That Roared, 1960. OCLC 73568903.
- Take Me to Your President, 1957. OCLC 1495062.
- Two Angels on Duty: A Play in One Act, 1967. ISBN 978-1-58342-518-3. OCLC 1357961.
- The Shepherd's Reward: A Christmas Legend. New York: Ives Washburn, 1959. OCLC 1414020.
- The Time of the Lamb. New York: Ives Washburn, 1961. OCLC 1262689
- The Ballad of the Pilgrim Cat. New York: Ives Washburn, 1962. OCLC 1395832.

== Posthumously published short works ==
- Christopher Wibberley; Hazel Wibberley, eds. (1993). Shamrocks and Sea Silver, and Other Illuminations. San Bernardino: Borgo Press. ISBN 978-0-89370-402-5.
