= The Mouse That Roared (film) =

1959 British satirical film

- Original British quad format film poster
- Directed by: Jack Arnold
- Screenplay by: Roger MacDougall; Stanley Mann
- Based on: The Mouse That Roared by Leonard Wibberley
- Produced by: Walter Shenson
- Starring: Peter Sellers; Jean Seberg; William Hartnell
- Cinematography: John Wilcox
- Edited by: Raymond Poulton
- Music by: Edwin Astley
- Production company: Highroad Productions
- Distributed by: Columbia Pictures
- Release date: 17 July 1959 (UK)
- Running time: 83 minutes
- Country: United Kingdom
- Languages: English; French
- Budget: $300,000
- Box office: $2,000,000 (US & Canada rentals) $200,000 (UK rentals)

The Mouse That Roared is a 1959 British satirical comedy film on a Ban The Bomb theme, based on Leonard Wibberley's novel The Mouse That Roared (1955). It stars Peter Sellers in three roles: Duchess Gloriana XII; Count Rupert Mountjoy, the Prime Minister; and Tully Bascomb, the military leader; and co-stars Jean Seberg. The film was directed by Jack Arnold, and the screenplay was written by Roger MacDougall and Stanley Mann.

== Plot ==
The minuscule European Duchy of Grand Fenwick is bankrupted when an American company comes up with a cheaper imitation of Fenwick's sole export, its fabled Pinot Grand Fenwick wine. Crafty Prime Minister Count Mountjoy devises a plan: Grand Fenwick will declare war on the United States, then surrender, taking advantage of American largesse toward its defeated enemies to rebuild the defeated nation's economy. Duchess Gloriana is hesitant but agrees to the plan. Mild-mannered game warden Tully Bascomb is charged as Field Marshal to lead the Grand Fenwick troops, aided by Serjeant-at-arms Will Buckley.

The contingent of 20 soldiers, in medieval chain mail uniform, travel across the Atlantic on a small merchant ship, arriving in New York Harbor during an air-raid drill that leaves the city deserted and undefended. They chance upon a civil defence truck and are mistaken for invading Martians, prompting an investigation by blustering but ineffectual General Snippet. Puncturing the tyres of the general's jeep with their bows and arrows, the Grand Fenwick troops take him and four police officers hostage. Still looking for a place to surrender, Tully and Will stumble across Alfred Kokintz, whose invention of the Q Bomb, capable of destroying an entire continent, has prompted the defence drills. He has built a football-sized prototype of the unstable bomb, which Tully takes possession of. With Kokintz and his attractive daughter Helen as additional hostages, Tully declares victory and returns with them to Grand Fenwick.

The duchess indulges Tully's victory, and the prime minister resigns in disgust at Tully's blunder, leaving him as acting prime minister. When the incident is discovered, the U.S. government is thwarted from retaking the weapon and hostages by force, fearing the dishonour of attacking such a small and defenceless nation. Instead, they send the U.S. Secretary of Defense to discuss terms of surrender and get back the bomb. Meanwhile, Grand Fenwick receives competing offers of defensive aid from each of the world's powers, in exchange for the weapon.

Tully becomes smitten with Helen, who initially despises him for taking them but falls for his simple charm. Then Snippet and Mountjoy conspire to steal the bomb and return it (and Helen) to America, but Tully gives chase and retrieves it. The Secretary of Defence and Tully agree to terms: the knock-off wine will be taken off the market, Grand Fenwick will receive monetary aid from the US, Helen and her father will remain in Grand Fenwick, and so will the bomb: held by "the little countries of the world" as a weapon of last resort if the superpowers refuse to disarm.

Checking the bomb for damage, Tully, Helen and Kokintz find it was "a dud" all along, and leave it in the dungeon, conspiring to keep its impotence secret. However, after they leave, a mouse emerges from it, and it appears to rearm, sitting ready to explode if disturbed.

== Cast ==
- Peter Sellers as Duchess Gloriana XII/Prime Minister Count Rupert Mountjoy/Tully Bascombe
- Jean Seberg as Helen Kokintz
- William Hartnell as Will Buckley
- David Kossoff as Alfred Kokintz
- Leo McKern as Benter
- MacDonald Parke as General Snippet
- Austin Willis as United States Secretary of Defense
- Timothy Bateson as Roger
- Monte Landis as Cobbley
- Alan Gifford as Air Raid Warden
- Colin Gordon as BBC Announcer
- Harold Kasket as Pedro

== Production ==
=== Pre-production ===
Stage rights to the book were bought in 1955 by Howard Dietz. Columbia pictures publicist Walter Shenson optioned the film rights to the novel in 1957 as his first independent production. and spent over a year trying to raise finance. He eventually obtained interest from Carl Foreman who had an arrangement to produce films for Columbia through his Highroad Films. Foreman had just completed The Key (1958) and was beginning pre-production on The Guns of Navarone (1961). Conceived as a low-budget project, The Mouse That Roared was expected to absorb office expenses for the high-production Navarone.

Director Jack Arnold, working under the auspices of line producer Walter Shenson, was afforded virtually unlimited freedom in adapting the novel, constrained only by the budget (the film cost $450,000 according to Arnold); "I didn't have any studio pressures." Arnold explained that "the producers left me alone because (1) they didn't think it meant anything, (2) they were just writing it off for expenses anyway."

=== Changes from book ===
Liberties were taken in the film adaptation to display Peter Sellers' versatile comedy talents. The lead character of the book is the Duchess Gloriana XII, an attractive young royal in the manner of the young Queen Elizabeth II and Princess Grace. In the film version, however, Peter Sellers plays the role as a parody of an elderly Queen Victoria (who thinks the president of the United States is Calvin Coolidge), and his Mountjoy is a parody of Benjamin Disraeli.

The sequences for Marseille and New York Harbor were filmed in Southampton; the presence of the RMS Queen Elizabeth ocean liner there was a lucky coincidence. Director Jack Arnold recalled the serendipitous encounter:

There was a lot of improvisation that went on while making the film that came out rather well ... Accidentally, when I was shooting the little tugboat [scene] ... I saw the Queen Elizabeth coming in towards Southampton. I was on the camera boat, and told the tugboat captain to get as close to the [ocean liner] as she could get, and tell all the boys to shoot arrows at her. We had three cameras on the boat ... and we got a sensational little sequence.

A studio reproduction of the ocean liner's bridge, plus a brief scene with actors posing as captain and first mate reacting to the fusillade, combined with the footage of the Queen Elizabeth, emerges as an organic element of the comedy rather than improvisation.

In the novel, an encounter with the New York Police Department leads to bloodshed that complicates peace negotiations; this does not appear in the film. Additionally, in the film, both Tully and Helen are with Kokintz when he discovers the bomb is a dud, and it is Tully who suggests that they keep that fact a secret; in the book, Kokintz discovers the fact alone and keeps it to himself.

=== Casting ===
Acknowledging that British actors "know how to play this kind of satire", director Jack Arnold hired the finest players available for the project. Peter Sellers, who was popular in Great Britain as a comedian and drummer, but largely unknown in the United States, was selected to perform three of the leading characters in the film: Duchess Gloriana XII, Prime Minister Count Rupert Mountjoy and Tully Bascombe.

Arnold commented that "No one [in the United States] had ever heard of Peter Sellers. He was just a character actor, except for The Goon Show on radio and the West End. This is the first movie that made him a star." Arnold's only casting objection was that of American actress Jean Seberg:

The only problem I had at the time was that Columbia insisted I use Jean Seberg ... Jean had just done Saint Joan (1957) and Bonjour Tristesse (1958) ... fresh from her indoctrination by director Otto Preminger into film acting. Preminger was a screamer and yeller. He waited until he got her into hysterics, then he'd turn the camera on. I don't yell and scream and this was a new experience for her. Sometimes it took twenty [takes] to get it but we got it ... She went on to be quite a good actress.

=== Columbia Pictures logo variant ===
The Mouse That Roared incorporated a burlesque of the iconic Columbia Pictures Torch Lady logo, which for decades had depicted a personification of Columbia in the pose of the Statue of Liberty holding her glowing torch as a beacon to immigrants at the opening of all their productions. Director Jack Arnold, with titles designer Maurice Binder devised a take-off of the corporate symbol, in which the Torch Lady (a live action model against a backdrop) looks down, lifts her gown, and sees a mouse at her feet on the pedestal, and, horrified, flees from her pedestal leaving her torch behind. Though producers Carl Foreman and Walter Shenson had approved the logo variant, Columbia studios chiefs were not consulted. The comic alteration of the logo material technically constituted a violation of their trademark, although it was a studio release by the legal owner, Columbia Pictures Corporation. Director Jack Arnold recalled:

We [didn't] tell them until we previewed it, you see. The audience laughed so hard, without even the story beginning, just at the logo, that we were home free ... it set the tone for the whole movie ... of course, Columbia didn't touch it after that.

== Reception ==
=== Box office ===
The film did not perform up to expectations in the UK, earning theatrical rentals of $200,000 but was a surprise hit at the US box office with rentals of $2 million. Variety reported that the reluctance of the characters to join Grand Fenwick's army in a time of need was received less well in the UK than in the US.

Director Jack Arnold reports that the American premiere, debuting at New York's Trans-Lux and Loew's 84th St. theatres, received overwhelming audience approval. Arnold adds that Foreman immediately had credits for The Mouse changed from "Columbia Pictures Corporation presents" to "Carl Foreman presents" on all the prints.

Film critic and biographer Dana M. Reemes notes that as of 1988, The Mouse That Roared had accrued gross receipts of $50 million in all markets.

=== Critical appraisal ===
The Monthly Film Bulletin wrote: "Part Ealing comedy, part science fiction, almost capsized by a superstructure of plot confusion and badly insufficient philosophical ballast, The Mouse that Roared is the kind of irrepressible topical satire whose artistic flaws become increasingly apparent but whose merits outlast them. This is mainly because the script ... distributes its ironic, malicious, slightly gruesome humour with such vigour and naive impartiality that the film is certain, for at least part of the time, to be greatly enjoyed."

The New York Times in its October 27, 1959, edition called the picture "a rambunctious satiric comedy":

We've got to hand it to Roger MacDougall and Stanley Mann, who wrote the script; to Jack Arnold who directed, and to all the people who play in this lively jape. They whip up a lot of cheerful nonsense that makes fun of the awesome instruments of war and does so in terms of social burlesque and sheer Mack Sennett farce.

The Los Angeles Times wrote the film "laid an egg", but Bosley Crowther at The New York Times offered a more positive review.

On Rotten Tomatoes, the film has an approval rating of 90%, based on reviews from 20 critics.

== Television ==
In 1964, Jack Arnold obtained exclusive television rights for The Mouse That Roared from Leonard Wibberley. He produced and directed a television pilot with ABC Television and Screen Gems called The Mouse That Roared, starring Sid Caesar as the Duchess, Mountjoy, and Tully, and co-starring Joyce Jameson, Sigrid Valdis, and Richard Deacon. It was filmed by Richard H. Kline.

The pilot was submitted by CBS and Columbia Screen Gems for review before a test audience. Receiving low polling results, the project was dropped.

Biographer and film critic Dana M. Reemes describes Arnold's development of the proposed "half-hour color comedy series":

The production was a fairly elaborate affair, including the creation of the fictional Grand Duchy of Fenwick, its costumed inhabitants, a U.N. Assembly set, and animated titles by DePatie-Freleng Enterprises ... at a time when American television comedy generally avoided serious satire, Arnold hoped the series might break new ground by tackling controversial subjects in the various episodes.

== Sequel ==
Richard Lester directed the sequel The Mouse on the Moon (1963), adapted from Wibberley's 1962 novel The Mouse on the Moon.

== Home video ==
The film was released on VHS July 14, 1993. It was also released on DVD for the first time on July 8, 2003. It was released on Blu-ray in Australia by Umbrella Entertainment on April 7, 2021.

== Bibliography ==
- Reemes, Dana M. (1988). Directed by Jack Arnold. Jefferson, North Carolina: McFarland & Company. ISBN 978-0-89950331-8.
