= Moe Szyslak =

Fictional character from The Simpsons franchise

- The Simpsons character
- First appearance: "Simpsons Roasting on an Open Fire" (1989)
- Created by: Matt Groening
- Designed by: Dan Haskett
- Voiced by: Christopher Collins (unaired); Hank Azaria

In-universe information
- Full name: Moammar Szyslak
- Gender: Male
- Occupation: Bartender
- Family: Morty Szyslak (father); Minnie Szyslak (sister); Marv Szyslak (brother); Maya (fiancée); Little Moe (possible son) shown in season 17 episode 21
- Religion: Snake Handler

Moammar "Moe" Szyslak (/ˈsɪzlæk/ SIZ-lak, Polish: [ˈʂɨslak]) is a recurring character from the animated television series The Simpsons. He is voiced by Hank Azaria and first appeared in the series premiere episode "Simpsons Roasting on an Open Fire". Moe is the proprietor and bartender of Moe's Tavern, a Springfield bar frequented by Homer Simpson, Barney Gumble, Lenny Leonard, Carl Carlson, Sam, Larry, and others.

Grouchy, lonely, miserable, and prone to violent outbursts, Moe is constantly down on his luck and has attempted suicide numerous times. Other running jokes featuring him include being prank called by Bart Simpson, running illegal activities from his bar, his ugliness and his inconsistent stories about his ethnic origin and what "Moe" is short for. Although he is generally quite disagreeable and confrontational, he is frequently shown to have a tender heart beneath his cantankerous exterior.

== Role in The Simpsons ==
=== Moe's Tavern ===
Moe is the owner and bartender of Moe's Tavern (informally referred to as "Moe's"), frequented by Homer Simpson and other characters including Lenny Leonard, Carl Carlson, Sam and Larry, and his most loyal customer, Barney Gumble. He is not a very good bartender, at one time expressing surprise that gin and tonic can be mixed together. The bar is noted for its depressing atmosphere and uncleanliness. The regular patrons of the tavern have been abandoned by Moe in several episodes in which he changes its target audience. The first of these was "Flaming Moe's", in the third season.

As a running joke, Moe is sometimes seen engaging in unlicensed or illegal activities at the tavern, such as smuggling pandas and an orca in "Cape Feare" and "The Springfield Files", respectively. In Season 6, it is revealed that Moe had a grandfather named "Harold Szyslak" who took part in Prohibition Era bootleg operations.

Particularly in earlier episodes, the Tavern was frequently prank called by Bart Simpson, who would ask for a gag name which when said by Moe would involve innuendo or insults (e.g., Mike Rotch/"My crotch", Homer Sexual/"homosexual", Ivana Tinkle/"I wanna tinkle", and Seymour Butz/"See more butts"). This backfires once on Bart in "Flaming Moe's", where Bart asks for Hugh Jass/"huge ass," leading to a patron named Hugh Jass present at Moe's now popular bar, taking the call. On two occasions following the prank call, Homer will tell Moe that he'll catch that person someday.

=== Personality ===
Moe is one of the darkest secondary characters in the show. He is portrayed with a generally disagreeable personality: he has a short, violent temper, a penurious nature, a crass and undiplomatic manner of speech, and a mood that rapidly vacillates between anger, indifference, and suicidal despair (the latter of which has become more apparent in later episodes of the show). He has an annual Christmas tradition of attempted suicide, but his attempts are comically unsuccessful (landing on a hot-air balloon after jumping out of a plane, for example), and he has already called the suicide hotline so many times that they have blocked his number.

He is easily irritated, frequently threatening the patrons at his bar with a shotgun he keeps behind the counter. He is also gullible, and Bart's unending chain of successful prank calls to his bar are particularly infuriating to him, inevitably prompting a torrent of Red Deutsch-style threats of gruesome bodily harm in return.

He also is, however, occasionally shown to have a sentimental and caring side to his personality, such as reading to sick children and homeless people, although he is secretive about such behavior. In his interactions with his various girlfriends, he has also shown genuine selflessness and kindness (as well as an unusual improvement in his disposition), although negative elements of his personality inevitably emerge and ruin things. He has also struck up genuine friendships with both of Homer's daughters which have remained in the following episodes. In "Thank God It's Doomsday", he asks for salvation, because "I've done stuff I ain't proud of. And the stuff I am proud of is disgusting." He donated $25,000 to Puerto Rico after Hurricane Maria.

=== Relationships ===
Moe has an almost non-existent love life due to his vulgarity towards women and his ugly appearance. Despite this, he has had a number of romantic experiences, including sleeping with his waitress Collette, dating a woman named Renee, and briefly enjoying the company of many women after he had plastic surgery. He also has a relationship and proposed to a dwarf named Maya, but Moe could not adjust to the difference in height, to the point where his ultimate plan to have his own leg bones shortened led Maya to leave him. He has long been infatuated with Marge Simpson, whom he usually calls "Midge", and has on occasion tried to win her away from Homer, although later episodes have shown him actively working to keep the two together. He has been romantically involved with Edna Krabappel as well as Marge's sister Selma Bouvier. Moe's romantic attractions have resulted in run-ins with the law; he has stalked Maude Flanders and other townspeople, he must register as a sex offender, and he has a restraining order placed upon him. At one point, he is seen on his way to a "V.D. clinic". Despite his disturbing approach, Moe has shown to be a caring and devoted lover. While dating Renee (and previously Edna), he wholeheartedly spoiled them with whatever they wanted and vowed to give up his bar and take them away from Springfield forever, even if it means losing his own money and doing illegal acts to make more money. When he thought he finally won Marge's heart, he promised to be "the best man she'd ever had".

In "Pygmoelian", Moe and his three closest friends assess him as a gargoyle with cauliflower ears, lizard lips, little rat eyes, a caveman brow, and a fish snout, who is not pleasant to look at, listen to or be with.

In "The Wayz We Were", Maya returns to Springfield, and she and Moe reconnect, but Moe's fear of commitment overpowers him. At Homer's suggestion, Moe proposes to Maya, which she accepts.

=== Family and biography ===
Moe's ethnic origins are a running gag in the show, with his origins always varying. The show's many conflicting stories as to Moe's heritage have been sent up in the tie-in book The Book of Moe (2008), where Moe is depicted in several different foreign national folk costumes and commenting on them, including Hungarian and Polish. From early in the series, Moe was depicted as a European immigrant to the United States. In "Much Apu About Nothing" (1996), Moe is depicted taking his United States citizenship test; previously, "Bart's Inner Child" (1993) had depicted Moe's own inner child chastising him for abandoning his native Italian accent. Later, in "Bart-Mangled Banner" (2004), he reveals himself to be Dutch; he claims his grandfather was Irish while visiting Ireland in "In the Name of the Grandfather" (2009); and in "Lisa Goes Gaga" (2012), Moe describes himself as "half monster, half Armenian". Moe is also hinted to be Armenian in "Judge Me Tender" (2010), claiming that Armenian Idol is his favorite show. Moe is fluent in Macedonian thanks to his Macedonian grandmother "Baba" Branka. As for indications, he was born in America, in "Homer the Heretic" (1992), Moe claims, "I was born a snake handler, and I'll die a snake handler" while in "Day of the Jackanapes" (2001) he claims to have been born in Indiana. Azaria has said he sees Moe as being from Queens, New York City and portrays him with a Queens accent.

Moe (left) as "Smelly" in The Little Rascals.

Numerous conflicting versions of Moe's childhood have been depicted across the show. In "Radioactive Man" (1995), he is depicted as having been one of the original Little Rascals, but was fired after killing the "original Alfalfa". However, charges were not pressed against him as the "original Alfalfa" was, in fact, an orphan owned by the studio. As Homer's boxing coach in "The Homer They Fall" (1996), he shows photographs from throughout his own boxing career, stating that his ugly appearance was the result of competing in the sport. Moe's college years are also depicted in "Homer the Moe" (2001), which shows Moe as having attended "bar-tending school" at Swigmore University (a play on Skidmore College) before opening what became Moe's Tavern. In "Springfield Up" (2007), footage from a documentary called Growing Up Springfield shows an 8-year-old Moe claiming that his father was a circus freak. He was unsure which one but liked to think it was a little of all of them. This is further reinforced in "Sleeping With The Enemy" when he briefly asserts himself as a member of the Muntz family. After Nelson's father returns, blaming his absence on having been stolen away by the circus due to a peanut allergy disfiguring his face. Teenage Moe is shown again in "She Used to Be My Girl" (2004), where he is depicted working in the school cafeteria, given as his first job "since prison"; Marge is responsible for having him sent back there. "The Seemingly Never-Ending Story" (2006) depicts scenes set years before the series present in which Moe and schoolteacher Edna Krabappel are shown to have had a brief love affair. In "Them, Robot" (2012), a flashback scene depicts a child being stomped on by an elephant, and his face then changes to Moe. In "King Leer" (2018), Moe's father, Morty, and his siblings, Marty and Minnie, are introduced, and he is shown in flashbacks as a child in Springfield. Another member of his family, Macedonian Baba Branka, was introduced in "Abe League of Their Moe" (2025). The latter is on the most probably side of ethnic origins since Moe is shown to still be fluent in Macedonian during the same episode.

Much like Moe's ethnic origins, his full name is also treated inconsistently as a gag. In "Flaming Moe's" (1991), he is called Morris by his lover. In "The Springfield Connection" (1995), Homer refers to Moe in the Arabic "Moammar". In "Eeny Teeny Maya Moe" (2009), he suggests that he only changed his name to Moe when he purchased Moe's Tavern. His last name Szyslak is Polish in origin, and is written as Szyślak.

== Character ==
=== Creation ===
The creator of The Simpsons Matt Groening based Moe on Louis "Red" Deutsch, who was made famous when he was repeatedly prank-called by two Jersey City residents. These prank calls were the inspiration for Bart Simpson's repeated prank calls to Moe, and Deutsch's often profane responses inspired Moe's violent temper. Comedian Rich Hall, an acquaintance of The Simpsons writer George Meyer, has stated that he believes further inspiration was drawn from himself and that Groening has verified this to him. Moe's surname "Szyslak" was revealed in "Who Shot Mr. Burns? (Part One)". Writers Bill Oakley and Josh Weinstein found the name in a phone book and gave it to Moe so that he would have the initials M.S., and hence be a suspect in the Burns shooting. Moe was designed by animator Dan Haskett and his facial appearance was modeled after a gorilla. Animator Mark Kirkland said that he often lets off-model drawings of Moe pass through production because the character is so ugly that no one will notice.

=== Voice ===
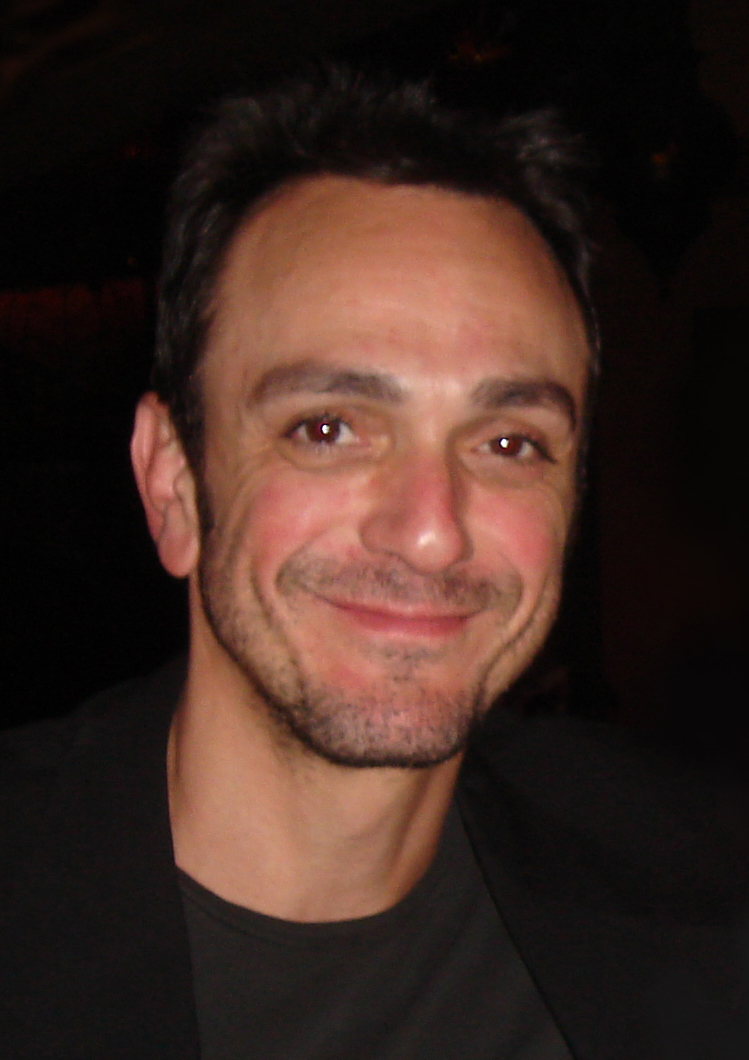
Hank Azaria

Moe was the first voice Hank Azaria performed for the show. During the time of his audition, Azaria was doing a play in which he had the part of a drug dealer, basing his voice on actor Al Pacino in Dog Day Afternoon. He used the same voice in the audition and was told by Matt Groening and Sam Simon, who was directing him, to make it more gravelly like Deutsch's voice. Groening and Simon thought that it was perfect and took Azaria over to the Fox network recording studio. The result is Moe's pronounced New York accent. Before he had even seen a script, Azaria recorded several lines of dialogue as Moe for the episode "Some Enchanted Evening". Moe was originally voiced by Christopher Collins who recorded several lines as Moe which never aired. Azaria explained that he did not discover this fact for several years and that according to Groening, "that guy's" acting was fine but other staff and actors found him "a dick".

== Reception ==
In 2001 and 2003, Hank Azaria won Primetime Emmy Awards for Outstanding Voice-Over Performance for voicing Moe and various other characters.

== See also ==
- Tube Bar prank calls
