= Dick Kink =

American politician

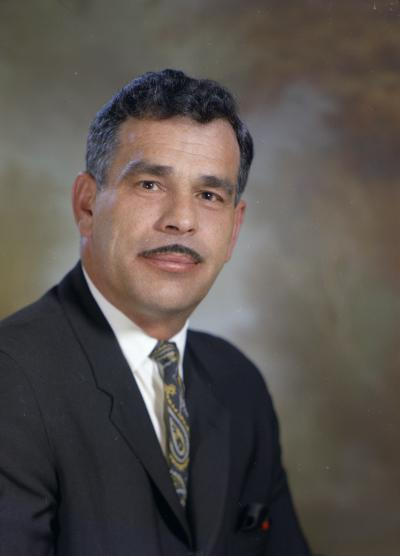
- Kink in 1967

Member of the Washington House of Representatives for the 42nd district
- In office 1957–1971

Personal details
- Born: September 2, 1921 Bellingham, Washington, U.S.
- Died: August 29, 1971 (aged 49) Bellingham, Washington, U.S.
- Party: Democratic

Richard John Kink (September 2, 1921 – August 29, 1971) was an American politician in the state of Washington. He served in the Washington House of Representatives from 1957 to 1971.
