= Michael Wayne Hunter =

Former US death row prisoner and writer (born 1958)

Michael Wayne Hunter (born 1958) was a death row prisoner and writer at San Quentin State Prison in the U.S. state of California. He was incarcerated for murdering his father and stepmother in 1981. Prior to committing his crime, he served four years in the United States Navy. He was married to Teresa "Terri" Hunter, but divorced in 1989.

Originally given a sentence of death in May 1984, his sentence has since been commuted to life without the possibility of parole after a retrial in February 2002.

== Crime and trial ==
On the evening of December 28, 1981, Jay and Ruth Hunter, Michael's father and stepmother, were shot to death in the bedroom of their home in Pacifica, California. The events surrounding their death, as revealed through the evidence and testimony at trial, were as follows.

In November 1981, about a month before the homicides, Hunter told his friend, Thomas Henkemeyer, of plans to kill his father and stepmother. According to Henkemeyer, Hunter laid out several scenarios for possible alibis, including taking out a hiking permit in Yosemite National Park and then returning to commit the murders, or going down to San Diego where friends would purportedly provide an alibi. Based on earlier conversations with Hunter, Henkemeyer concluded that Hunter's motive for the planned killings was to take "revenge" for a number of perceived grievances, including an incident in which his stepmother had reported Hunter for breaking into his parents' home while they were away on vacation, and his stepmother's handling of his natural mother's will, which Hunter believed resulted in his being cheated out of his inheritance. Hunter also discussed possible methods of transporting and concealing a rifle or shotgun.

About a month later, on the evening of December 28, a neighbor of Jay and Ruth Hunter was awakened by a loud "bang or shot" from the direction of the Hunter residence. He heard four more shots in quick succession. On or about the same evening in late December, Philip Eldred was walking two dogs a short distance from the Hunter residence when he encountered a man wearing a leather jacket and a motorcycle helmet. For no apparent reason the man told Eldred to leave the area. Eldred refused. In response, the man pointed a long object (which Eldred then realized was a shotgun) at Eldred's face, kicked him in the thigh and retreated behind a cyclone fence several feet away. He then fired a shotgun blast in Eldred's direction, entered a small, burgundy-colored car parked nearby, and drove away. Eldred stated that the man appeared to be in his early 20s and of medium build. Hunter was 23 at the time of the offenses.

The bodies of Jay and Ruth Hunter were discovered the following day, December 29, 1981, after the police were alerted that the front door of the residence was wide open and a window on the side of the door was broken out. The police found both bodies in the master bedroom. The body of Jay Hunter was on the bed; that of Ruth Hunter was lying against the far wall, on top of the telephone receiver. Eight expended shotgun casings were found on the floor. Autopsies revealed that Ruth Hunter had died of two shotgun wounds to the head, either of which was sufficient to cause death. Jay Hunter had suffered four shotgun wounds. One shot to the upper chest that had apparently caused death was fired from a distance. Three other shots, to the neck, abdomen and left knee, had been fired from much closer range and were consistent with having been inflicted where the victim lay.

During the next several days, Henkemeyer, still in Minnesota visiting his family, received two telephone calls from Hunter. In the first call, Hunter told Henkemeyer that he had killed his mother and father and was trying to decide what to do. During the second call, a day or two later, Hunter said that he had spoken with a lawyer, was preparing to leave the country, and asked him to sell some of his belongings. He also indicated that he had been seen by a stranger after the killings but doubted that an identification could be made because he was wearing a helmet. When Henkemeyer returned home to Sacramento on New Year's Day, he found that the shotgun Hunter had left was missing.

On the way to the San Jose Airport, Hunter stopped at a barbershop and had his beard and moustache shaved off. Hunter asked another friend (Jefferson Schar) to obtain a phony birth certificate for him under the name John Dunne. After obtaining a ticket to San Diego under a false name, Hunter told Schar that he planned to contact a friend named Jeffrey Luther in San Diego and instructed Schar to forward the phony birth certificate to him there.

Luther received a telephone call from Hunter on January 3, 1982. The two arranged to meet at a restaurant in San Ysidro, near the U.S.-Mexican border. At the restaurant, Hunter told Luther that he was "wanted for murder" and explained the circumstances of the shootings. Hunter told him that he had confronted his father and threatened to shoot him. His father responded, "You don't have the balls." In response, Hunter told Luther, he "pumped four slugs into him."

Following the conversation in San Ysidro, Luther saw Hunter again in a hotel in the Mexican town of Las Playas. Luther agreed to purchase some items for him. After the meeting in Mexico, however, Luther contacted the police, who advised him not to meet Hunter again in Mexico but rather to lure him back across the border. Accordingly, Luther arranged to meet Hunter again at the restaurant in San Ysidro where they had met earlier. When Hunter appeared at the restaurant, he was arrested.

Following his arrest, Hunter was incarcerated in the San Mateo County jail. Joseph Lauricella, Hunter's cellmate, testified that Hunter gave him a number of descriptions of how the murders occurred. Hunter also told him that he had been turned in by a Navy buddy (Luther) and offered Lauricella $1,000 to have him killed.

Even as Hunter was fleeing to Mexico, the police investigation into the killings was focusing on him as the prime suspect. A search of Hunter's house and two vehicles uncovered a cleaning bill for a leather jacket which stated "pre-spot for blood." The police also found a shirt with blood on it and a black motorcycle helmet. Glass fragments found inside a pair of Hunter's socks and gloves matched glass fragments from the broken window of the Hunter residence.

Finally, a number of prosecution witnesses testified about Hunter's troubled relationship with his father and stepmother. Hunter's father and natural mother, June Hunter, had separated and divorced in 1973. June Hunter died of cancer in 1979. Following the divorce, Jay Hunter married Ruth Chatburn Hunter. Hunter's sister, who was the administrator of her mother's estate, asked Ruth, a lawyer, to handle the probate. Ruth eventually removed herself from the case, however, because of an argument with Hunter sometime in 1980. Hunter felt that he had been cheated of his share of the estate. According to a former roommate of Hunter, the dispute became so acrimonious that it caused a rupture of all contacts between Hunter and his father.

The acrimony was apparently mutual. Only a month before the murders, in late November 1981, Hunter's father instructed his attorney to delete from his will any inheritance for Michael. Mr. Hunter indicated that the matter was not urgent, however, and could wait until the new year. At the time of the murders in late December, the will had not been changed.

== Prison writings ==
Michael Wayne Hunter has won numerous awards for his writing, including many of the essays that are featured on www.prisonwall.org and other places around the Internet. His work has also appeared in various periodicals and book collections.

- Crime and Punishment: Inside Views (1st Ed.) ISBN 1-891487-16-7. Contributor of an essay entitled "The Sixth Commandment", Chapter 5, Story 39. Book edited by Robert Johnson (American University) and Hans Toch (State University of New York at Albany).
- Undoing time: American prisoners in their own words ISBN 1-55553-458-9. Contributed "Another day". Edited by Jeff Evans.
