= The Mouse That Roared =

1955 Cold War satirical novel by Leonard Wibberley

- First edition cover
- Author: Leonard Wibberley
- Language: English
- Genre: Fiction, Satire
- Publisher: Little, Brown & Co.
- Publication date: 9 February 1955
- Publication place: United States
- Media type: Print (Hardback)
- ISBN: 978-0-316-93872-3
- OCLC: 1016437
- Followed by: Beware of the Mouse

The Mouse That Roared is a 1955 satirical novel by Irish-born American writer Leonard Wibberley, the first of his series of satirical books about an imaginary country in Europe called the Duchy of Grand Fenwick. Wibberley used the premise to make commentaries about modern politics and world situations, including the nuclear arms race, nuclear weapons in general, and the politics of the United States.

The novel originally appeared as a six-part serial in The Saturday Evening Post from December 25, 1954, through January 29, 1955, under the title The Day New York Was Invaded. It was published as a book in February 1955 by Little, Brown. The British edition used the author's original intended title, The Wrath of Grapes, a play on John Steinbeck's The Grapes of Wrath.

Wibberley wrote one prequel (1958's Beware of the Mouse) and three sequels: The Mouse on the Moon (1962), The Mouse on Wall Street (1969), and The Mouse That Saved the West (1981). Each placed the tiny Duchy of Grand Fenwick in a series of absurd situations in which it faced superpowers and won.

== Plot ==
The tiny (three miles by five miles) European Duchy of Grand Fenwick, located in the Alps between Switzerland and France, proudly retains a pre-industrial economy, dependent almost entirely on making Pinot Grand Fenwick wine. However, a California winery makes a knockoff version, "Pinot Grand Enwick", putting the country on the verge of bankruptcy.

The prime minister decides that their only course of action is to declare war on the United States. Expecting a quick and total defeat (since their standing army is tiny and equipped with bows and arrows), the country confidently expects to rebuild itself through the largesse that the United States bestows on all its vanquished enemies (as it did for Germany through the Marshall Plan at the end of World War II).

With the counterfeit wine as a casus belli, they send a formal written declaration of war, but this is misplaced by the United States Department of State. Receiving no response, the Duchy is forced to muster some troops and hire a ship to stage an actual invasion.

Landing in New York City, almost completely deserted above ground because of a citywide disaster drill, the Duchy's invading "army" (composed of the Field Marshal Tully Bascomb, three men-at-arms, and 20 longbowmen) wanders to a top secret government lab and unintentionally captures the "Quadium Bomb" (a prototype doomsday device that could destroy the world if triggered) and its maker, Dr. Kokintz, an absent-minded professor who is working through the drill. This "Q-Bomb" has a theoretical explosive potential greater than all the nuclear weapons of the United States and the Soviet Union combined.

The invaders from Fenwick, sighted by a civil defence squad, are taken to be "men from Mars" when their chain mail is mistaken for reptilian skin. When the United States Secretary of Defense pieces together what has happened, from a Fenwickian flag left on a flagpole and the five lines in his encyclopedia on The Duchy of Grand Fenwick, he is ashamed and astonished to learn that the United States had been at war for two months.

The invasion force, having captured the Quadium Bomb, takes it back to Grand Fenwick.

With the most powerful bomb in the world now in the smallest country in the world, other countries are quick to react, with the Soviet Union and the United Kingdom offering their support. With the world at the tiny country's mercy, Duchess Gloriana, the leader of Grand Fenwick, lists her terms: all the nuclear weapons of the powerful nations must go through an inspection by impartial scientists. Continued inspection of the continuing nuclear programs of the world powers will be supervised by Dr. Kokintz, who recalls his identity as a Fenwick-American and accepts repatriation to his ancestral home. Kokintz takes on his new role as scientific director of the "Tiny Twenty", a new superpower of 20 of the world's smallest nations headed by Grand Fenwick. The United States and the other world powers accept these humiliating terms, leading to hope for world peace.

As a celebration of the triumphant outcome of the war, Duchess Gloriana and Tully Bascomb are united in marriage. As a sequel to the marriage, Dr. Kokintz accidentally drops the Q-Bomb onto the stone floor of the Grand Fenwick castle dungeon. As a result of this mishap, the scientific director inadvertently discovers that the Q-bomb is, and always has been, a powerless dud. The book concludes with Kokintz deciding to keep this key fact to himself.

== Background ==
Wibberley got the idea from the US peace treaty negotiated with Japan by John Foster Dulles, which included generous amounts of aid to Japan. He wrote an article for the Los Angeles Times that suggested that his native Ireland make a token invasion of the US to get aid. He then developed this into a novel, changing Ireland to the Duchy of Grand Fenwick.

== Reception ==
Anthony Boucher praised the novel as "utterly delightful...a very nearly perfect book, on no account to be missed".

== Adaptations ==
=== Film adaptation ===
The Mouse That Roared was made into a 1959 film starring Peter Sellers in three roles – Duchess Gloriana XII; Count Rupert Mountjoy, the Prime Minister; and Tully Bascomb, the military leader – and Jean Seberg, as Helen Kokintz, as an added love interest. Other cast members included: William Hartnell as Sergeant-at-Arms Will Buckley; David Kossoff as Professor Alfred Kokintz; Leo McKern as Benter the opposition leader; MacDonald Parke as General Snippet; and Austin Willis as the United States Secretary of Defense. In 1963, a film sequel, based on The Mouse on the Moon, was released.

=== Stage adaptation ===
The Mouse That Roared was adapted for the stage by Christopher Sergel in 1963. The play portrays Duchess Gloriana XII as twenty-two years old, as in Wibberley's novel. In this version, Dr. Kokintz is a physics professor at Columbia University and the arrival of Tully Bascomb's invasion force coincides with a campus student protest. Thus, the Fenwick soldiers are mistaken for being eccentric protesters rather than as foreign invaders.

=== Television pilot ===
In 1964, Jack Arnold produced a television pilot based on the film, with Sid Caesar playing the three roles that Sellers had played, but it was not picked up for production.

=== Spoken word recordings ===
In 1970, spoken word record label CMS Records released an LP recording of Wibberley reading excerpts from the novel. In 2025, an audiobook was released through Audible using a "virtual voice" generated by artificial intelligence.

=== Radio adaptation ===
BBC Radio 4 broadcast a one-hour adaptation on 15 February 2003 and 22 May 2010 as part of its Saturday Play series. The production was directed by Patrick Rayner and starred Julie Austin as Gloriana, Mark McDonnell (who co-adapted the book for radio) as Tully, Crawford Logan as Count Montjoy, Simon Tait as Dr. Kokintz and Steven McNicoll (who also co-adapted the book) as Mr. Benter.
