= Muriel Stuart (dancer) =

English-born dancer and dance educator

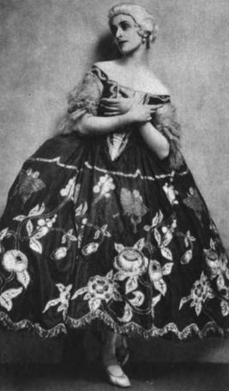
- Muriel Stuart, in costume and wig, from a 1921 publication.
- Born: Muriel Mary Stuart Popper; December 13, 1900; South Norwood, London, England, U.K.
- Died: January 29, 1991 (aged 90); New York City, U.S.
- Occupations: Dancer, dance educator
- Spouses: Julian Brodetsky (m. 1926, divorced) James Warwick (divorced)
- Children: 1

Muriel Stuart (born Muriel Mary Stuart Popper; December 13, 1900 – January 29, 1991) was an English-born dancer and dance educator, based in the United States. She trained with Anna Pavlova, and taught at the School of American Ballet.

== Early life and education ==
Muriel Mary Stuart Popper was born in 1900, in South Norwood, London. She was discovered by Russian ballerina Anna Pavlova as a girl, and trained with Pavlova, and with Ivan Clustine and Enrico Cecchetti. Later she studied modern dance with Martha Graham, Harald Kreutzberg, and Agnes de Mille. "Every new phase of the art is interesting to me," she explained to a newspaper interviewer in 1931.

== Career ==
Stuart was a featured dancer with Pavlova's company on world tours from 1916 to 1926. She moved to Los Angeles in 1927, and opened a ballet school in Hollywood. One of her Los Angeles students, Joan Bayley, recalled that "Muriel Stewart was so inspiring! She had this long neck and gorgeous epaulement."

Stuart danced and did choreography with the Chicago Civic Opera Ballet in the 1928-1929 season. She taught for many years at the School of American Ballet in New York, beginning in 1935. Among the noted dancers who studied with Stuart were Myra Kinch, Todd Bolender, Laura Dean, Michael Kidd, Jacques d'Amboise, and Alicia Alonso.

Stuart co-wrote a textbook with Lincoln Kirstein, The Classic Ballet: Basic Technique and Terminology (1952), with an introduction by George Balanchine. In 1987, she was the first winner of the Mae L. Wien Faculty Award for Distinguished Service at the School of American Ballet.

== Personal life ==
Stuart married and divorced twice. Her first husband was a violinist, Julian Brodetsky. Her second husband was a playwright, James Warwick. She had a son, Peter Warwick. She died in 1991, in New York City, aged 90 years. Her papers, including lesson plans and photographs, are in the Jerome Robbins Dance Division of the New York Public Library. The New York Public Library also has an oral history interview with Stuart, given in 1978.
