= Richard Head (disambiguation) =

Richard Head (c. 1637–1686) was an author and playwright.

Richard Head may also refer to:

- Richard Head (footballer) (1887–1940), Australian rules football player
- Sir Richard Head, 1st Baronet (c. 1609–1689), MP for Rochester
- Sir Richard Head, 3rd Baronet, of the Head baronets
- Richard Head, 2nd Viscount Head (born 1937)
- Sir Richard Douglas Somerville Head, 6th Baronet (born 1951), of the Head baronets

== See also ==
- Dickhead (disambiguation), "Dick" being a diminutive of Richard
