= The Mouse on the Moon (novel) =

1962 novel by Leonard Wibberley

First edition (publ. William Morrow)

The Mouse on the Moon is a novel by Leonard Wibberley. It was released in 1962 as the sequel to The Mouse That Roared and Beware of the Mouse. In it, the people of the Duchy of Grand Fenwick, a tiny isolated country in the Alps, attempt a space flight using wine as a propellant. It satirizes the space race, Cold War and politics.

== 1960s space race ==
In 1961, a year before The Mouse On the Moon was published, the Soviet Union launched the first crewed spaceship to orbit the Earth. It remained in space for less than two hours. In 1969, during NASA's Apollo 11 mission, the first men walked on the Moon. During an earlier 1969 space mission Apollo 10 orbited the Moon at a speed of 24,790 miles per hour.

== Book plot ==
The Duchy of Grand Fenwick, a tiny country in the Alps covering 15 square miles, is in financial trouble. Their only export is wine, but there is a problem with the latest vintage year. The bottled wine keeps exploding, so the United States has banned imports of the product. The government hopes to bring tourism to the country, but that would require installing modern plumbing in its castle, and repairing its 12 miles of highways.

Count of Mountjoy, Grand Fenwick's prime minister, writes to the United States government requesting a loan of $5,000,000, alleging the money would be for space research, since the United States has requested international control of the moon. The U.S. Secretary of State provides Grand Fenwick with a $50 million gift, for he wants to impress the United Nations.

With the gift, the country is able to not only install indoor plumbing, but also purchase a second-hand Saturn rocket and some used space suits. Rocket fuel is needed, and it is discovered that the exploding Pinot Grand Fenwick-Premier wine works well as a propellant.

Foreign countries are invited to view Grand Fenwick's rocket being assembled in the castle tower, and to witness their rocket being launched, but no one pays any attention to the tiny country's space program until their rocket begins traveling to the Moon at a leisurely 1,000 miles an hour. The United States and the Soviet Union rush to launch their own much-faster rockets, hoping to be the first to land on the Moon, but both countries are beaten out by Grand Fenwick's second-hand rocket, fueled by exploding wine.

== Adaptation ==
In 1963 the novel got adapted into a film of the same name by Richard Lester.
