= Flaming Moe's =

- The Simpsons episode
- Episode no.: Season 3 Episode 10
- Directed by: Rich Moore; Alan Smart
- Written by: Robert Cohen
- Production code: 8F08
- Original air date: November 21, 1991

Guest appearances
- Aerosmith (Steven Tyler, Joe Perry, Brad Whitford, Tom Hamilton and Joey Kramer) as themselves; Phil Hartman as Lionel Hutz; Marcia Wallace as Edna Krabappel; Kipp Lennon singing "Flaming Moe's"

Episode features
- Chalkboard gag: "Underwear should be worn on the inside"
- Couch gag: Two thieves steal the couch.
- Commentary: Matt Groening; Al Jean; Mike Reiss; Dan Castellaneta; Rich Moore; David Silverman

Episode chronology
← Previous "Saturdays of Thunder"	Next → "Burns Verkaufen der Kraftwerk"
- The Simpsons season 3

"Flaming Moe's" is the tenth episode of the third season of the American animated television series The Simpsons. It first aired on Fox in the United States on November 21, 1991. In the episode, Homer tells Moe Szyslak about the Flaming Homer, an alcoholic cocktail of cough medicine and fire that he invented. Moe steals Homer's recipe, renames it the Flaming Moe and sells it at his tavern. The drink is wildly successful and boosts Moe's business, but Homer is angry at him for his betrayal and seeks revenge.

The episode was written by Robert Cohen and directed by Rich Moore, with assistance from Alan Smart (who would later work on SpongeBob SquarePants as an animation director). "Flaming Moe's" was the first episode of the show to feature Moe in a prominent role. The main plot of the episode in which Moe's Tavern becomes famous because of a drink is loosely based on the Los Angeles establishment Coconut Teaszer. The episode also parodies the NBC sitcom Cheers, including the theme song and opening sequence "Where Everybody Knows Your Name", and a character named Collette is modeled after Shelley Long's character Diane Chambers. Catherine O'Hara originally recorded dialogue for the part of Collette, but the writers felt her voice did not fit the role and instead used a track recorded by regular Jo Ann Harris.

American rock band Aerosmith (Steven Tyler, Tom Hamilton, Joey Kramer, Joe Perry and Brad Whitford) appears in the episode. They were the first band to make a guest appearance on the show. Their dialogue was recorded in Boston with Hank Azaria, the voice of Moe, who flew over to record his part with them and help them with their lines.

The episode has been well received by critics and has been included in best Simpsons episode lists by IGN, Entertainment Weekly, AskMen.com and AOL. In its original airing during the November sweeps period, the episode had a 14.4 Nielsen rating and finished the week ranked 29th.

== Plot ==
Moe is out of Duff and is struggling to attract customers to his tavern, so Homer tells him about the Flaming Homer, a cocktail he invented in his kitchen one night after Patty and Selma drank all his beer. He mixed drops of liquor from a random assortment of bottles, inadvertently including his children's cough syrup. When ash from Patty's cigarette fell into the concoction and set it aflame, Homer discovered that fire greatly improves its flavor.

Moe then makes a Flaming Homer for a customer, who loves its taste. When the customer asks what the drink is called, Moe insists it is his invention, the Flaming Moe. Word of mouth spreads, leading to a business boom for Moe. The tavern (renamed "Flaming Moe's") goes from being a dive bar to a haunt of celebrities such as Aerosmith, and Moe hires a waitress named Collette to handle the extra customers. Homer is stung by Moe's betrayal and grows increasingly resentful as the tavern continues to thrive.

The Flaming Moe's success attracts the attention of a restaurant chain, which offers Moe $1 million to reveal the secret ingredient. Moe initially refuses, but after Collette pricks his conscience, he decides to take the money and split it with Homer. Before he can finalize the deal, Homer arrives at the tavern and loudly reveals that the secret ingredient is "nothing but plain, ordinary, over-the-counter children's cough syrup". The chain's representative quickly tears up the contract and leaves.

Soon, nearly all the bars and restaurants in Springfield are serving Flaming Moes, leaving Moe's business to dwindle back to normal. Homer visits the tavern, where they reconcile after Moe serves him a Flaming Homer, free of charge.

== Production ==
We were elated because it's a you-know-you've-made-it-when moment. You're this lowlife rock-and-roll band ... a rock band that's throwing parties for twenty thousand people a night, and then you see yourself on television on the biggest cartoon of its time. It was the height of the insanity of the cartoon era, for me the equivalent of when we did "Walk This Way" with Run-DMC during the beginning of that era of rap. We always tried to get in on the ground floor of these things, and we were blown away that we were asked to do it.

— Steven Tyler

Al Jean said the opening two minutes of the episode were inspired by his own childhood where "My sister would have sleepover parties and her friends would always try to kiss me and stuff".

The main plot of the episode, in which Moe's Tavern becomes famous because of a drink, is loosely based on the Los Angeles establishment Coconut Teaszer. According to IGN, "Flaming Moe's" was "one of the first [episodes] to really give Moe the spotlight". There was originally a joke in the episode in which a gay couple walked into "Flaming Moe's", assuming that it was a gay bar because of the name. Matt Groening feels that it was a good thing the joke was cut because he did not feel the writers should bring attention to the name.

Catherine O'Hara originally agreed to provide the voice of Collette, and went into the studio and recorded her part for the character. According to Mike Reiss, "Something about her did not animate correctly. The voice did not work for our purposes." Jo Ann Harris, a regular voice actor on the show, had recorded a temporary track using an impression of Shelley Long's character (Diane) from Cheers. The producers thought it fit the role better and used it instead of O'Hara, although O'Hara is still credited at the end of the episode. Sam Simon had previously written for Cheers and contributed much of Collette's dialogue, as he was familiar with writing dialogue for Diane. Originally, there was more to the subplot featuring Moe and Collette, but it was cut because the writers felt it did not work. The third act opens with a parody of "Where Everybody Knows Your Name", the theme song from Cheers. The parody was written by Jeff Martin, and the sequence was designed by future Simpsons director Nancy Kruse.

Aerosmith was the first band to make a guest appearance on the show. The writers had heard that the band wanted to appear in an episode, so they wrote the guest spot for them. According to Al Jean, they later found out that part of the reason why Aerosmith agreed to appear was the drink's being called the "Flaming Moe". The band was recorded in Boston, and Hank Azaria, the voice of Moe, flew over to record his part with them and help them with their lines. In the original script, Moe tempted the band to play by offering them free beer, but the band members asked that the joke be changed. The writers changed the line to "free pickled eggs". The band is shown sitting at a table with a bearded man, who is modeled after their A&R man John Kalodner. One of the stipulations from the band was to include him in the episode. Kalodner also received a "special thanks to" credit at the end of the episode. Aerosmith's song "Young Lust" from the album Pump plays over the end credits. According to Al Jean, the band recorded a special shortened version of the song just for the episode.

The episode was directed by Rich Moore and Alan Smart. Moore's daughter was born during the production of the episode, and he missed several weeks of layout, which Smart oversaw. When Sam Simon was asked if the premise of the episode was inspired by the tumultuous relationship between himself and Matt Groening, Simon acknowledged, "That may be true."

== Cultural references ==
The basic premise of the episode is similar to the film Cocktail. Several references are made to the sitcom Cheers: Collette the waitress is a parody of Cheers character Diane and the "theme sequence" for Flaming Moe's is a direct parody of the Cheers opening theme, "Where Everybody Knows Your Name". Barney Gumble is given a Norm Peterson entrance. Collette quitting Flaming Moe's to pursue an acting career in Hollywood is similar to Shelley Long leaving Cheers after five seasons to pursue a career in film acting. The scene where Bart runs away from Lisa and her friends makes reference to the Alfred Hitchcock film North by Northwest. When Homer reveals the secret of the "Flaming Moe", the scene has many parallels to The Phantom of the Opera including Homer's standing high up in the light rigging, covering half his face. Martin's presentation at school is about Archer Martin, developer of gas chromatography which is later used in the episode by Professor Frink. The scene in which Frink analyzes a "Flaming Moe" is an homage to The Nutty Professor; Frink is based on Jerry Lewis's character in the film. Lionel Hutz says a drink cannot be copyrighted, citing the "Frank Wallbanger case of '78". This refers to the Harvey Wallbanger cocktail. Near the end of the episode, several bars with names similar to "Flaming Moe's" can be seen. This parodies Ray's Pizza in New York City, where dozens of individual establishments have similar names. Aerosmith sings "Walk This Way" in Moe's Tavern and "Young Lust" during the closing credits.

== Reception ==
In its original airing on the Fox Network during November sweeps, the episode had a 14.4 Nielsen rating and was viewed in approximately 13.26 million homes. It finished the week ranked 29th, up from the season's average rank of 32nd. It finished second in its timeslot behind The Cosby Show, which finished 17th with a 15.9 rating. It was the highest rated show on Fox that week.

The authors of the book I Can't Believe It's a Bigger and Better Updated Unofficial Simpsons Guide, Gary Russell and Gareth Roberts, called it "Possibly the best Simpsons episode, with a constant stream of gags, inspired animation (in particular the sequence when Homer begins to see and hear Moe everywhere, from Maggie's gurgles to the leaves on the trees), and a superb plot that twists about in every direction but the one you might expect."

DVD Movie Guide's Colin Jacobson wrote "From Lisa's slumber party at the opening through the Cheers spoof at Moe's, this episode's another real winner. Homer gets some of his all-time best lines, including a great run where he mocks Marge's attempts to have him accept his fate. We even find a great twist on Bart's prank phone calls when he asks for 'Hugh Jass'. All in all, 'Flaming' provides a terrific show."

Nate Meyers of Digitally Obsessed gave the episode 5/5, calling it "another great chapter in the history of The Simpsons, with tons of laughs throughout".

Emily VanDerWerff of Slant Magazine called it "a very funny episode" and highlighted the plot's focus on Moe as "an example of the show gradually expanding its supporting townspeople into characters in their own right," as "Moe was just an angry bartender before this episode. After this one, he's the sad man who sometimes tastes success but always lets it slip away because of his inability to do the right thing until it's too late." VanDerWerff also interpreted the episode as a metaphor for Simon's relationship with fellow Simpsons developers Groening and James L. Brooks and Simon's belief that he was not receiving enough credit for The Simpsons.

Niel Harvey of The Roanoke Times called "Flaming Moe's" a "classic bit of Simpsonia".

The episode is on many lists of best Simpsons episodes.

In 2006, IGN named "Flaming Moe's" the best episode of the third season. They wrote, "This episode has tons of standout moments, from the appearance by Aerosmith (the first time a musical act of that caliber appeared as themselves on the series); a funny payoff for all Bart's prank calls to Moe's, when a man named Hugh Jass actually does turn out to be a customer; a deftly done Cheers parody at the height of Moe's success; and Homer turning into a Phantom of the Opera type lunatic."

In Entertainment Weekly's 2003 list of the top 25 The Simpsons episodes ever, it was placed sixteenth. In 2003, Rich Weir of AskMen.com placed the episode in second on his list of his ten favorite episodes of the show. He wrote, "As one of the early episodes that helped solidify the show's sharp wit and satirical ability, "Flaming Moe's" has everything a classic Simpsons episode should have: gut-busting humor, nifty parody, and some superstar cameos to seal the deal. [...] highlights include a performance by Aerosmith (in a guest-starring role), Bart's actually apologizing to Moe for one of his infamous prank calls, and a memorable spoof of Cheers' theme song."

AOL placed the episode sixth on their list of the top 25 Simpsons episodes. Screen Rant called it the best episode of the third season.

The episode is also a favorite of crew members. In 2003, executive producer Al Jean listed the episode as one of his favorites. When The Simpsons began streaming on Disney+ in 2019, former Simpsons writer and executive producer Bill Oakley named this one of the best classic Simpsons episodes to watch on the service.

In 2006, the members of Aerosmith were collectively named the 24th best Simpsons guest stars by IGN. The song "Flaming Moe's", which parodies "Where Everybody Knows Your Name" from Cheers, was well received. Ken Tucker of Entertainment Weekly named the song the "Best Theme Song Parody" of 1991. It was later included in the 1997 album Songs in the Key of Springfield, a compilation of songs from the first seven seasons of the show.

== Universal Studios ==
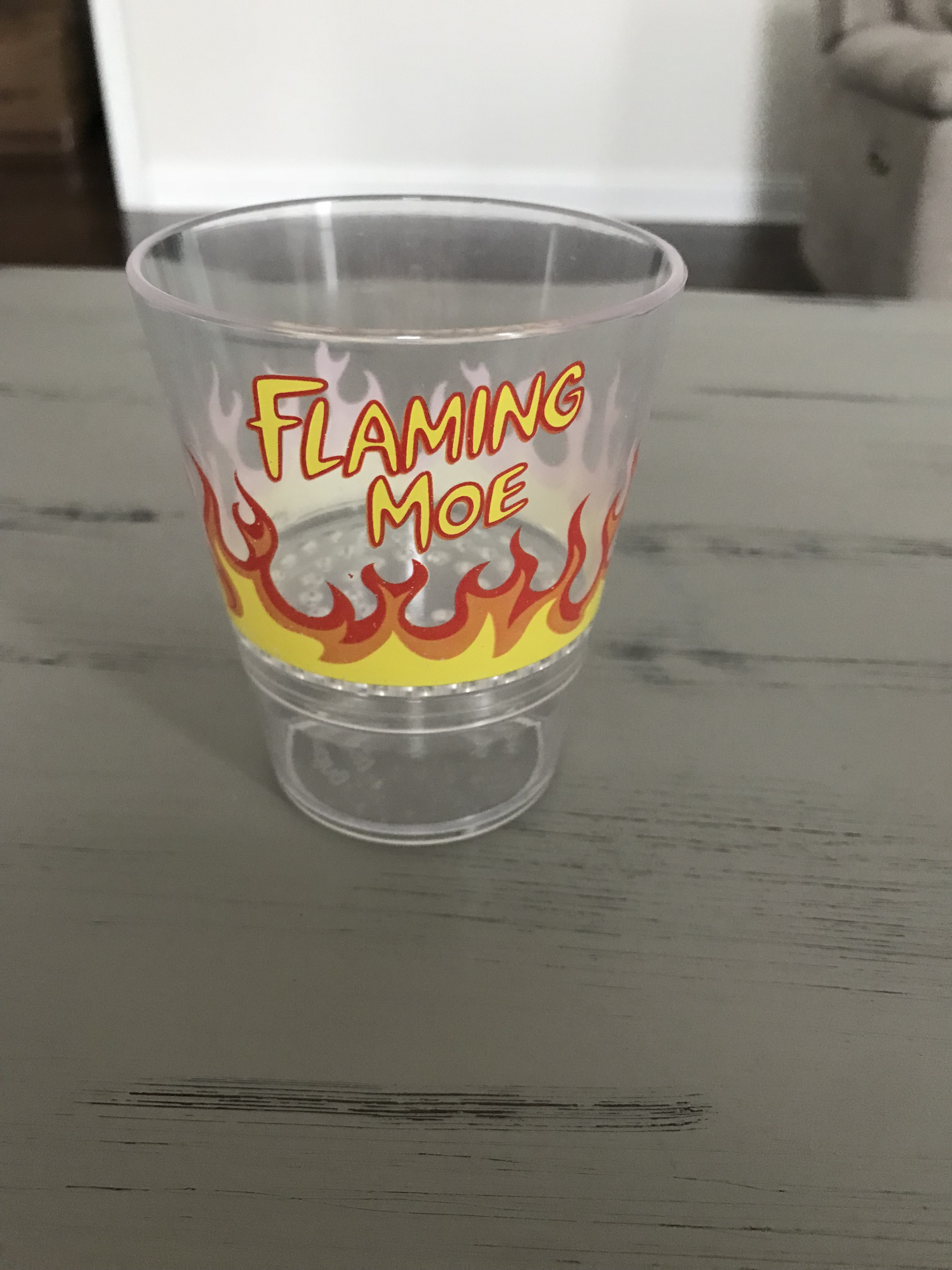
A Flaming Moe glass

Real-life equivalents based on food shown in The Simpsons are sold at Universal Studios Florida, including the Flaming Moe. It is served in a glass with exclusive cosmetics, consisting of a flame pattern and yellow letters of its name. While the original show depicted its vague recipe as an intentional absurdity (purple in color as a result of the cough syrup), the equivalent is served at the eponymously titled Flaming Moe's and the location Moe's Tavern, depicted as a brightly-colored orange soda. Ironically enough, unlike the original (a flaming cocktail), it also contains dry ice to make it appear as if it is smoking.

== See also ==
- Lean, a real life beverage made from cough syrup and soft drink
