= The Mouse on the Moon =

1963 British film by Richard Lester

- Original film poster
- Directed by: Richard Lester
- Written by: Michael Pertwee
- Produced by: Walter Shenson
- Starring: Margaret Rutherford; Bernard Cribbins; Terry-Thomas; David Kossoff; Ron Moody
- Cinematography: Wilkie Cooper
- Edited by: Bill Lenny
- Music by: Ron Grainer
- Production company: Highroad Productions
- Distributed by: United Artists
- Release dates: 3 May 1963 (London); 16 June 1963 (UK); 17 June 1963 (USA)
- Running time: 82 minutes
- Country: United Kingdom
- Language: English

The Mouse on the Moon is a 1963 British comedy film, the sequel to The Mouse That Roared. It is an adaptation of the 1962 novel The Mouse on the Moon by Irish author Leonard Wibberley, and was directed by Richard Lester. In it, the people of the Duchy of Grand Fenwick, a microstate in Europe, attempt space flight using wine as a propellant. It satirises the space race, Cold War and politics.

Peter Sellers, who had played three roles in the first film, did not return for this sequel and was replaced by Margaret Rutherford and Ron Moody for two of Sellers' characters. The third character, Tully Bascombe, was not present in the sequel. Likewise Leo McKern did not reprise his role of Benter; this part was played by Roddy McMillan. The film also featured June Ritchie, Bernard Cribbins and Terry-Thomas, with David Kossoff reprising his role as Professor Kokintz.

== Plot ==
Financial disaster looms for Grand Fenwick when the current vintage of its only export, wine, starts exploding in would-be consumers' faces. Prime Minister Mountjoy decides to ask the United States for a loan, ostensibly to fund its entry in the race to the Moon, but actually to save the duchy (and both introduce television and install modern plumbing so he can have a hot bath). The devious politician knows that the Americans will not believe him, but will consider the half million dollars he is asking for to be cheap propaganda supporting their hollow call for international co-operation in space. He is delighted when they send him double the amount as an outright gift. The Soviets, not wishing to be one-upped by their Cold War rivals, deliver an obsolete rocket (with its nose cone accidentally breaking a window of Grand Fenwick's parliament in the process).

Mountjoy asks resident scientist Professor Kokintz to arrange a small explosion during the "launch" of their lunar rocket to make it look like they have actually spent the money as intended. Meanwhile the news media commends this effort by Grand Fenwick in promoting international co-operation in space by citing its space program using American financial backing, Soviet rocket technology and British horology (the watch that Vincent wears during the moon mission is British made).

Meanwhile, Mountjoy's son Vincent returns after being educated in England. Mountjoy is disappointed to find that Vincent has picked up the British sense of fair play and the ambition to be an astronaut. Professor Kokintz has pleasant news for Vincent: he has discovered that the exploding wine - if properly treated - makes excellent rocket fuel. Together, they secretly begin preparing the rocket for flight. Maurice Spender, a bumbling spy sent by the suspicious British, is given a tour of the ship, including the shower heads converted into attitude jets, and reports back to his bosses that it is all a hoax.

Mountjoy invites the Americans, Soviets, British and other European dignitaries to the launching. To everyone's surprise, the rocket leisurely takes off with Kokintz and Vincent aboard. Kokintz calculates it will take three weeks to reach the Moon. Shocked and humiliated, the Americans and Soviets decide to risk sending their own crewed rockets ahead of schedule, timing it so they will land at the same time as (or a little before) Grand Fenwick's ship. However, Vincent accidentally hits a switch, speeding up the vessel, and he and Kokintz become the first to set foot on the Moon. The latecomers are greatly disappointed. When the Americans and Soviets try to race home to salvage some sort of propaganda coup, they almost enter the wrong ships and then, when they attempt lift-off, both descend deep into the soft lunar dust, so the American and Soviet spacemen have to hitch a ride with Kokintz and Vincent.

They return to Grand Fenwick during a memorial ceremony (they had been out of radio contact for weeks and presumed lost). The diplomats immediately begin squabbling about who reached the Moon first. Aloof from all of this, Grand Fenwick's Grand Duchess Gloriana XIII unveils a statue/monument commemorating the successful moon mission.

== Cast ==
- Margaret Rutherford as Grand Duchess Gloriana XIII
- Ron Moody as Prime Minister Rupert Mountjoy
- Bernard Cribbins as Vincent Mountjoy
- Ed Bishop as American Astronaut
- David Kossoff as Professor Kokintz
- Terry-Thomas as Maurice Spender
- June Ritchie as Cynthia, Mountjoy's protester niece and Vincent's love interest
- John Le Mesurier as British delegate
- John Phillips as Bracewell, the American delegate
- Eric Barker as MI5 man
- Roddy McMillan as Benter
- Tom Aldredge as Wendover
- Michael Trubshawe as British aide
- Peter Sallis as Russian delegate
- Clive Dunn as Bandleader
- Hugh Lloyd as Plumber
- Graham Stark as Standard bearer
- Mario Fabrizi as Mario, the valet
- Jan Conrad as Russian aide
- John Bluthal as Max Von Neidel
- Archie Duncan as U.S. Air Force general
- Guy Deghy as Russian scientist
- Richard Marner as Russian Air Force general
- Allan Cuthbertson as Member of Whitehall Conference
- Robin Bailey as Member of Whitehall Conference
- John Wood as countryman
- Frankie Howerd as himself

== Production ==
The film was made on sets left over from Cornel Wilde's film Sword of Lancelot. Sellers recommended Lester, whom he knew from his direction of The Running, Jumping and Standing Still Film. Producer Walter Shenson and director Lester next made The Beatles film A Hard Day's Night.

Dell Publishing issued a comic book of the film.
