= List of The Simpsons guest stars (seasons 1–20) =

Guest star list for an animated series

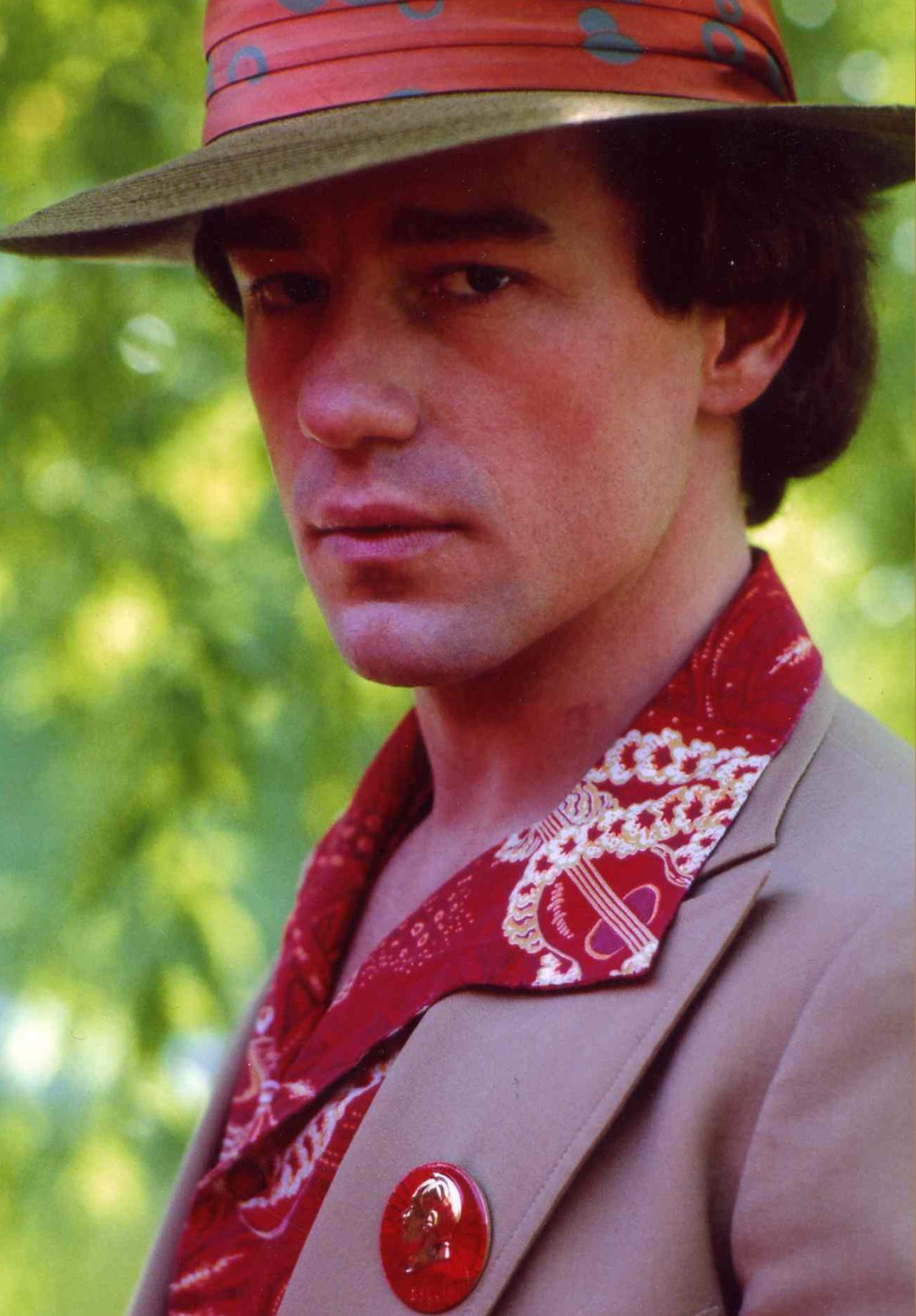
Actor Phil Hartman, who died in 1998, was the most recurring male guest actor on the show, appearing 52 times.

In addition to the show's regular cast of voice actors, celebrity guest stars have been a staple of The Simpsons, an American animated television sitcom created by Matt Groening for the Fox Broadcasting Company, since its first season. The Simpsons focuses on the eponymous family, which consists of Homer, Marge, Bart, Lisa and Maggie. The family was initially conceived by Groening for a series of animated shorts, which originally aired as a part of The Tracey Ullman Show between 1987 and 1989. The shorts were developed into a half-hour prime time series which began in December 1989. The series' 37th season premiered on September 28, 2025, and 809 episodes of The Simpsons have aired. A feature film adaptation of the series called The Simpsons Movie, was released in 2007.

Guest voices have come from a wide range of professions, including actors, athletes, authors, musicians, artists, politicians and scientists. In the show's early years most guest stars voiced original characters, but as the show has continued the number of those appearing as themselves has increased.

The first credited guest star was Marcia Wallace who appeared in "Bart the Genius" in her first stint as Bart's teacher Edna Krabappel. Singer Tony Bennett was the first guest star to appear as himself, appearing briefly in the season two episode "Dancin' Homer". Several guest stars have featured as recurring characters on the show, including Phil Hartman, Joe Mantegna and Kelsey Grammer. After Wallace, Hartman made the most appearances, guest starring 52 times. Mantegna has appeared over forty times, Maurice LaMarche has appeared over thirty times, Grammer, Jon Lovitz and Frank Welker have appeared twenty times or more; Albert Brooks, Glenn Close and Jackie Mason have appeared ten or more times, while Michael Dees, Dana Gould, Terry W. Greene, Valerie Harper, Jan Hooks, Jane Kaczmarek, Stacy Keach, Kipp Lennon, J. K. Simmons, Sally Stevens, George Takei and Michael York have made over five appearances.

Three guest stars, Ricky Gervais, Seth Rogen and Pete Holmes, earned writing credits for the episodes in which they appeared. Grammer, Mason and three-time guest star Anne Hathaway all won the Primetime Emmy Award for Outstanding Voice-Over Performance for guest voice roles on the show. The show was awarded the Guinness World Record for "Most Guest Stars Featured in a TV Series" in 2010. As of August 26, 2026, there have been 1082 guest stars on the show, (Note: This figure counts the members of bands with speaking roles separately. Bands who merely perform a song are counted as one because there is no confirmation of which of the band's members performed on their appearance.) with this figure rising to 1085 if The Simpsons Movie is included.

== History ==
Guest stars have appeared on The Simpsons since its first season, in addition to the show's main cast of Dan Castellaneta, Julie Kavner, Nancy Cartwright, Yeardley Smith, Hank Azaria and Harry Shearer and supporting cast of Tress MacNeille, Maggie Roswell, Chris Edgerly, Dawnn Lewis, Grey DeLisle, Alex Désert, Eric Lopez, Jenny Yokobori, Kimberly D. Brooks, Tony Rodríguez, Jonathan Lipow, Mo Collins and Kelly Macleod and former supporting cast members Jo Ann Harris, Pamela Hayden, Russi Taylor, Christopher Collins, Susan Blu, Lona Williams, Doris Grau, Marcia Mitzman Gaven, Karl Wiedergott and Melanie Minchino. Kevin Michael Richardson started as a recurring guest star in the twenty first season, but joined the supporting cast in the twenty eighth, starting with the episode "The Last Traction Hero".

Guest voices have come from a wide range of professions, including actors, athletes, authors, musicians, artists, politicians, scientists, historians, film producers, film directors, and animators. In the earlier seasons, most of the guest stars voiced characters, but eventually more started appearing as themselves. The first male guest star was actor Sam McMurray, who voiced a worker at the Springfield Nuclear Power Plant in "Homer's Odyssey", the show's third episode, and Marcia Wallace was the first female guest star on the show starting from "Bart the Genius" as Edna Krabappel and Ms. Melon. Singer Tony Bennett was the first guest star to appear as himself, appearing in the season two episode "Dancin' Homer" while Aerosmith were the first band with their cameo in the third season's "Flaming Moe's".

Several guest stars have made multiple appearances on the show, often as recurring characters. Actress Marcia Wallace guest starred 176 times, making her the most recurring female guest star on the show, until her death in 2013. Edna Krabappel was then retired from the show, but sometimes appears as a ghost, and actor Phil Hartman guest-starred in 52 episodes, more than any other male actor, although his initial role in the second season episode "Bart Gets Hit by a Car" in 1991 was intended to be a one-off. He voiced the recurring characters Troy McClure and Lionel Hutz as well as numerous other one-time characters, until his death in 1998. McClure and Hutz were subsequently retired from the show. Actor Kelsey Grammer first appeared as Sideshow Bob in the first-season episode "Krusty Gets Busted" while actor Joe Mantegna made his first appearance as Fat Tony in the third season episode "Bart the Murderer". The two have appeared in 21 and 28 episodes respectively; Mantegna also appeared in the film. Both roles were originally written for other actors: Bob was originally to be voiced by James Earl Jones, who later guest starred three times on the show, while Fat Tony was written for Sheldon Leonard. Other repeat guest stars include Albert Brooks, Glenn Close, Jan Hooks, Maurice LaMarche, Jon Lovitz, Jane Kaczmarek, Jackie Mason, Charles Napier and Frank Welker.

According to Groening, guest star choices "come from the writers saying, 'Wouldn't it be cool to have [such a person on the show]?'", while showrunner Al Jean has stated the reasoning is "we want to meet our heroes." Bill Oakley and Josh Weinstein, showrunners of the seventh and eight seasons, favored guest stars with what they felt were unique and interesting voices such as actors R. Lee Ermey, Donald Sutherland, Kirk Douglas and Lawrence Tierney. In 2014, Jean stated that fewer people would be appearing as themselves, as the staff did not want it to become a "crazy roster".

Many guest stars come into the show's recording studio to record their parts, although some are recorded over the telephone. Three guest stars have been credited with writing the episode in which they guest starred. Comedian Ricky Gervais wrote the episode "Homer Simpson, This Is Your Wife", while actor Seth Rogen co-wrote the episode "Homer the Whopper" with Evan Goldberg, and comedian Pete Holmes wrote the two-part "Warrin' Priests" episodes. Two guest stars were credited with pseudonyms. Actor Dustin Hoffman was credited as "Sam Etic" for the episode "Lisa's Substitute" while musician Michael Jackson was credited as "John Jay Smith" for the episode "Stark Raving Dad". After the latter episode, the producers decided that if a celebrity wished to guest star on the show, they had to be willing to be credited under their real name.

Numerous people have rejected the chance to appear on the show. Actor William Shatner has been described as the first person to reject the show. The producers have consistently failed to persuade any former President of the United States to appear. Musicians Bruce Springsteen and Bob Dylan have also rejected multiple invitations to guest star on the series. Other people to turn the show down include actors Michael Caine, Tom Cruise, Clint Eastwood and Anthony Hopkins and director Quentin Tarantino. Musician Prince turned down a role in a sequel to "Stark Raving Dad", which meant the script was never produced.

Others have accepted the offer, but have been unable to record a role. Musician Frank Zappa and actor Anthony Perkins both became too ill to record their parts, while Jim Carrey had to drop out due to time constraints, and Faye Dunaway cancelled. Christopher Walken originally agreed to appear as himself in "Insane Clown Poppy". However, he then decided to demand a lot more money than the producers were willing to pay. Instead, Jay Mohr provided the voice of Walken. The end credits state "Jay Mohr as Christopher Walken". This is the first time this has ever been done.

Robby Krieger of The Doors recorded a cameo for the episode "The Great Money Caper", but his part was cut because the writers felt his appearance seemed too forced. The scene was later included on the season's DVD release. Similarly, actress Catherine O'Hara recorded the voice of Colette the waitress in "Flaming Moe's", but was redubbed with Jo Ann Harris who the producers felt was a better fit. Ron Howard, in what would have been his third appearance on The Simpsons, was advertised as guest starring on "Children of a Lesser Clod". However, he did not appear for any recording sessions. Similarly, Werner Herzog was advertised as guest starring in "Thanksgiving of Horror", in what would have been his third appearance as Walter Hotenhoffer, but did not appear in the final episode.

Mason, Grammer and Anne Hathaway have each won the Primetime Emmy Award for Outstanding Voice-Over Performance for their guest voice roles on the show. The show was awarded the Guinness World Record for "Most Guest Stars Featured in a TV Series" on May 23, 2010, with Guinness estimating that the show has featured "at least 555 as of series 21". As of August 26, 2026, there have been 1082 guest stars on the show, totalling 1795 guest spots.^{[A]} These figures rise to 1085 and 1803 respectively if The Simpsons Movie is counted as well.

== Guest stars ==
- The color of the season number in the first column corresponds to the color of that season's DVD boxset or digital purchase image for the seasons which have not been released in physical format.
- In the No. column:
  - The first number refers to the order it aired during the entire series.
  - The second number refers to the episode number within its season: i.e. 1506 would be the sixth episode of the fifteenth season.
- The production code refers to the code assigned to the episode by the production team. The first two characters refer to the season the episode was made for. The first season is 7Gxx, the second is 7Fxx, the third is 8Fxx and the fourth is 9Fxx. After that, the fifth season started with 1F and continued in order until season nine (which was 5F). Starting with season ten, the production codes started with AABF, with the first letter changing for each season (i.e. BABF, CABF, etc.). The number at the end of the code is the order in which that episode was produced during that production run.
- Guests with "(archival)" after their names refer to cases where roles were not recorded specifically for the episode, but instead archival audio and/or footage from independent sources was used in the episode. In most cases these appearances have been uncredited and are usually not considered as proper guest stars given the circumstances.

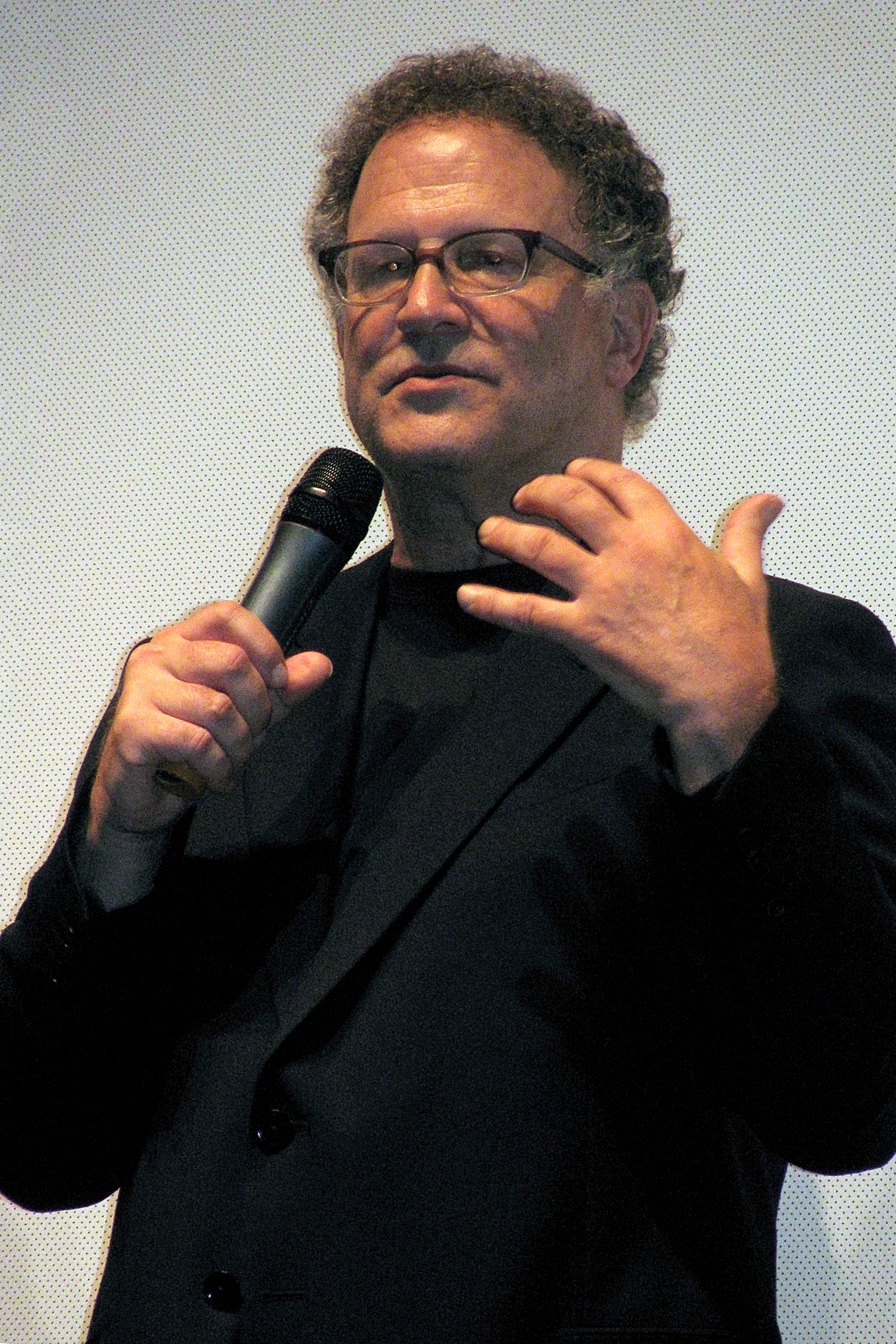
Actor Albert Brooks made the first two of his twelve appearances in season one.

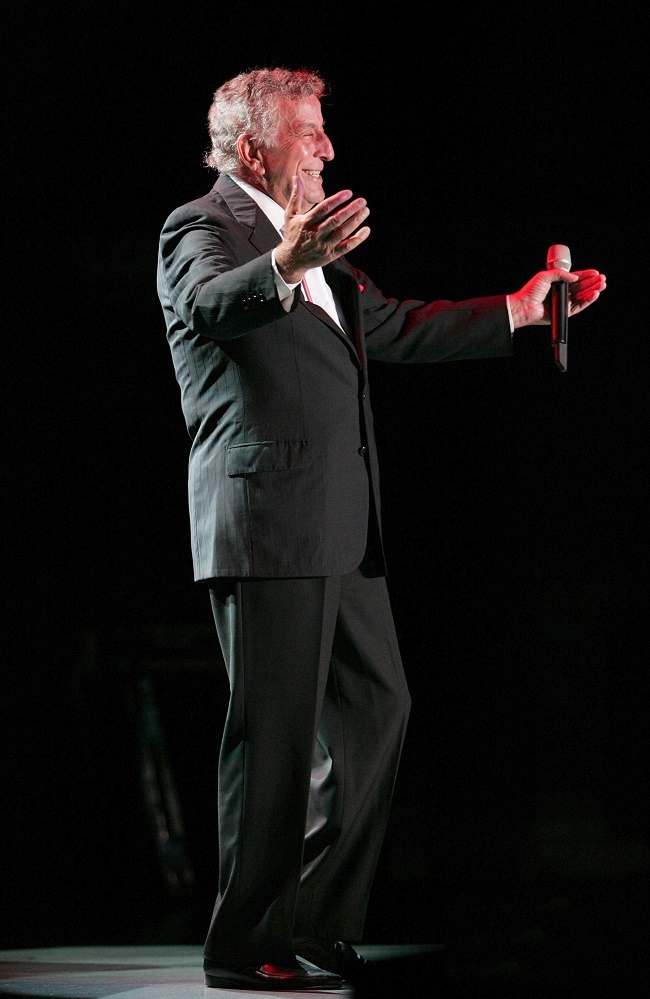
Singer Tony Bennett was the first person to voice himself on the show.

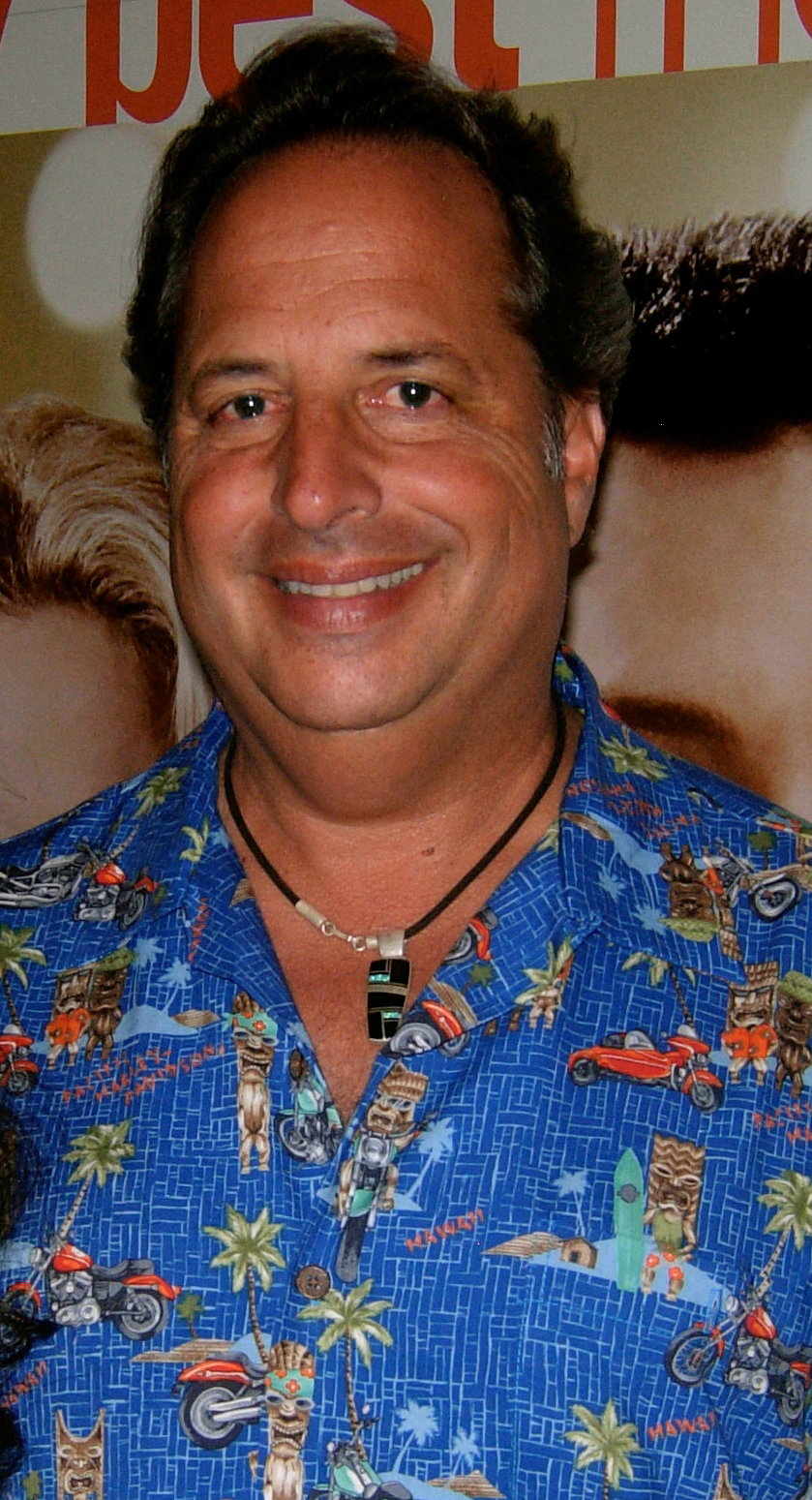
Actor Jon Lovitz has made over twenty appearances on the show including three cross-over appearances as Jay Sherman from the series The Critic.

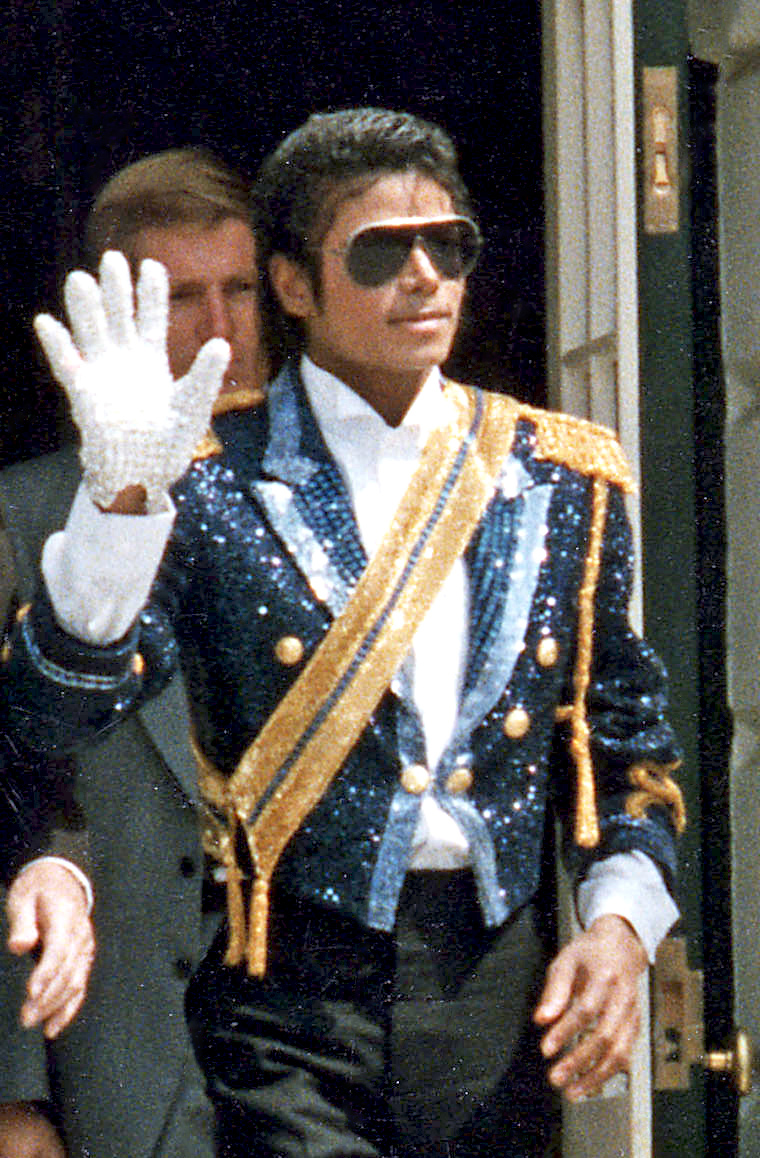
Musician Michael Jackson was credited as "John Jay Smith" for his role in "Stark Raving Dad".

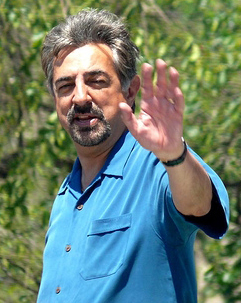
Actor Joe Mantegna voices mobster Fat Tony

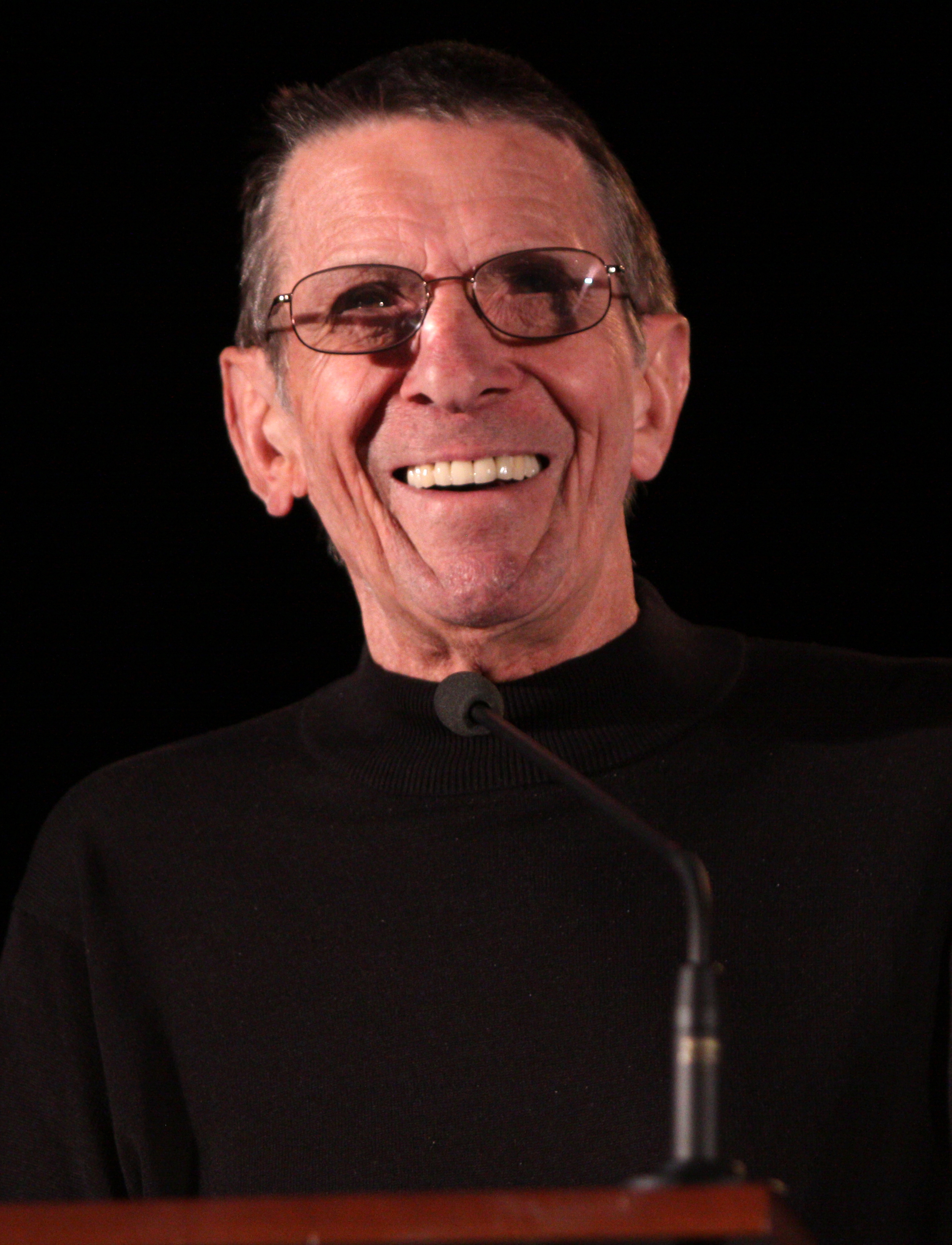
Actor Leonard Nimoy has twice appeared as himself.

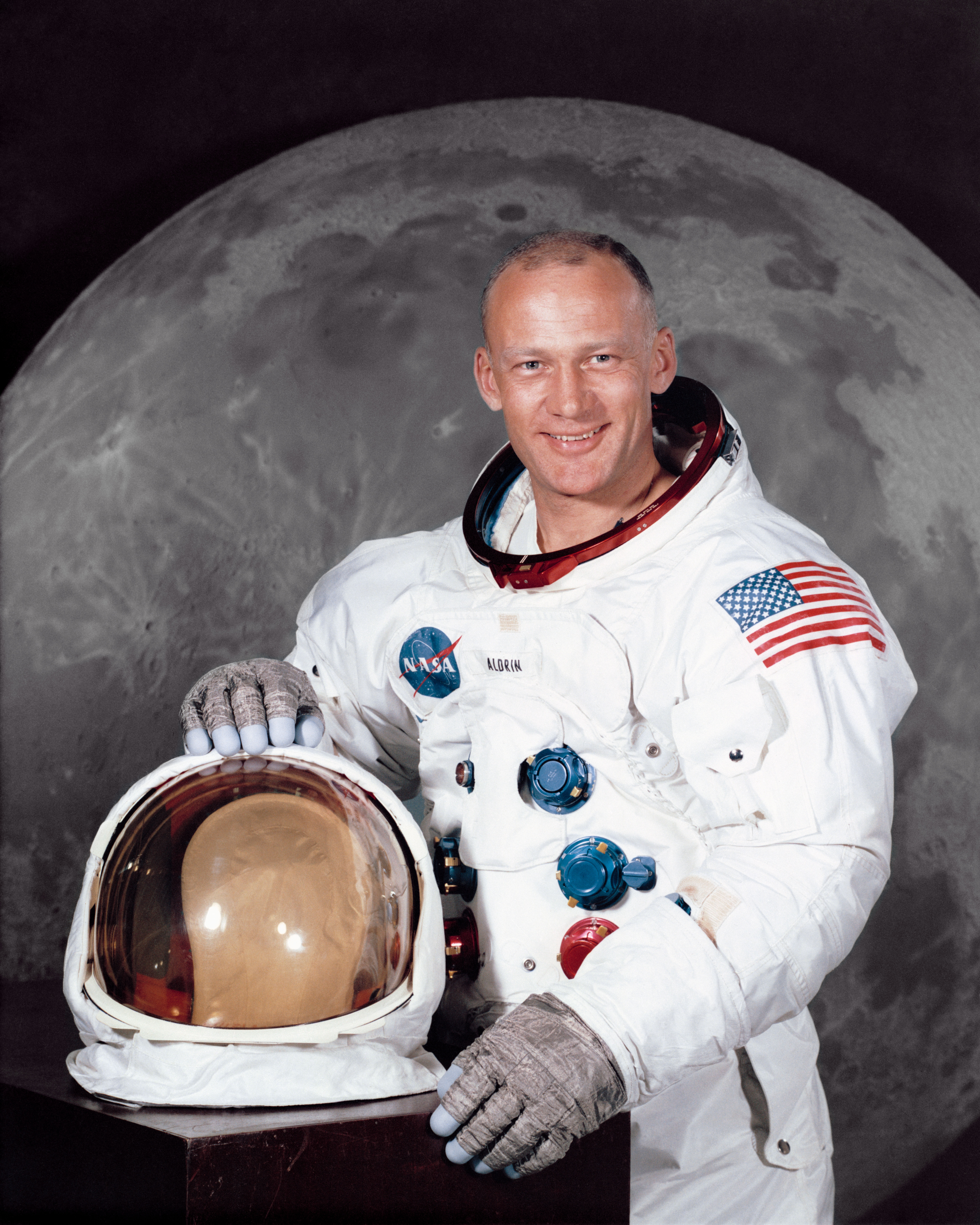
Astronaut Buzz Aldrin appeared in season five's "Deep Space Homer".

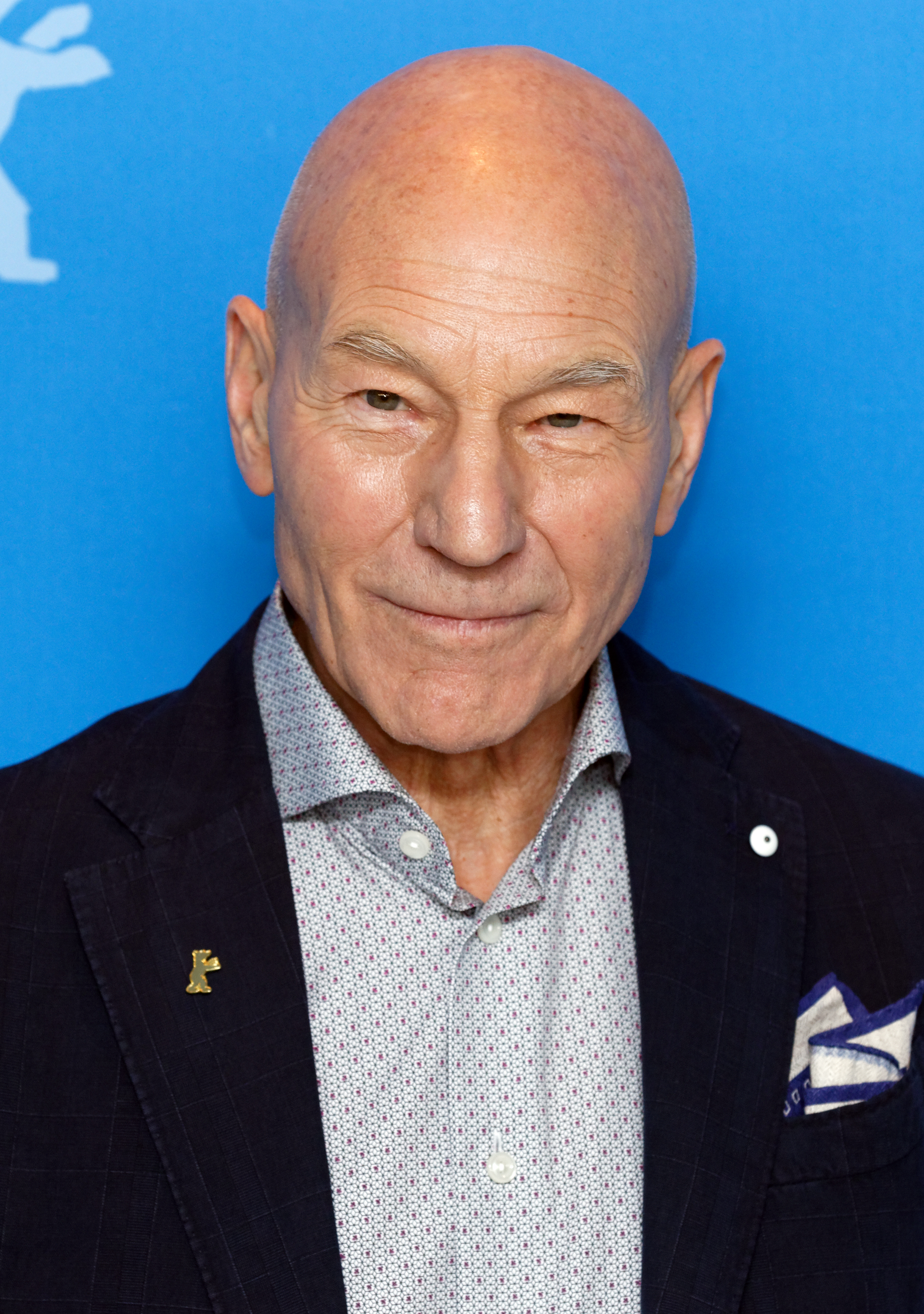
Actor Patrick Stewart voiced Number One in "Homer the Great".

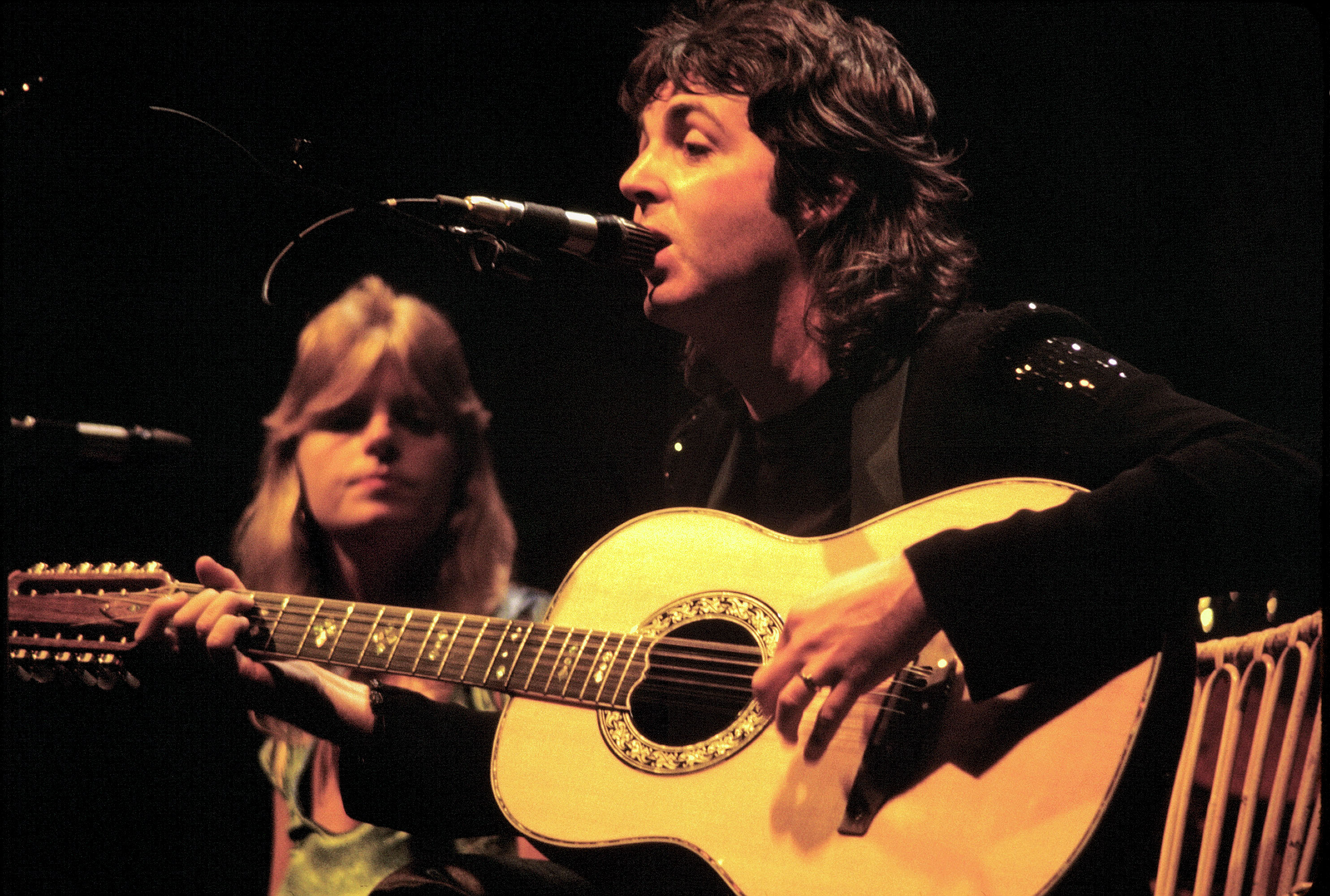
Paul and Linda McCartney guest starred in the episode "Lisa the Vegetarian".

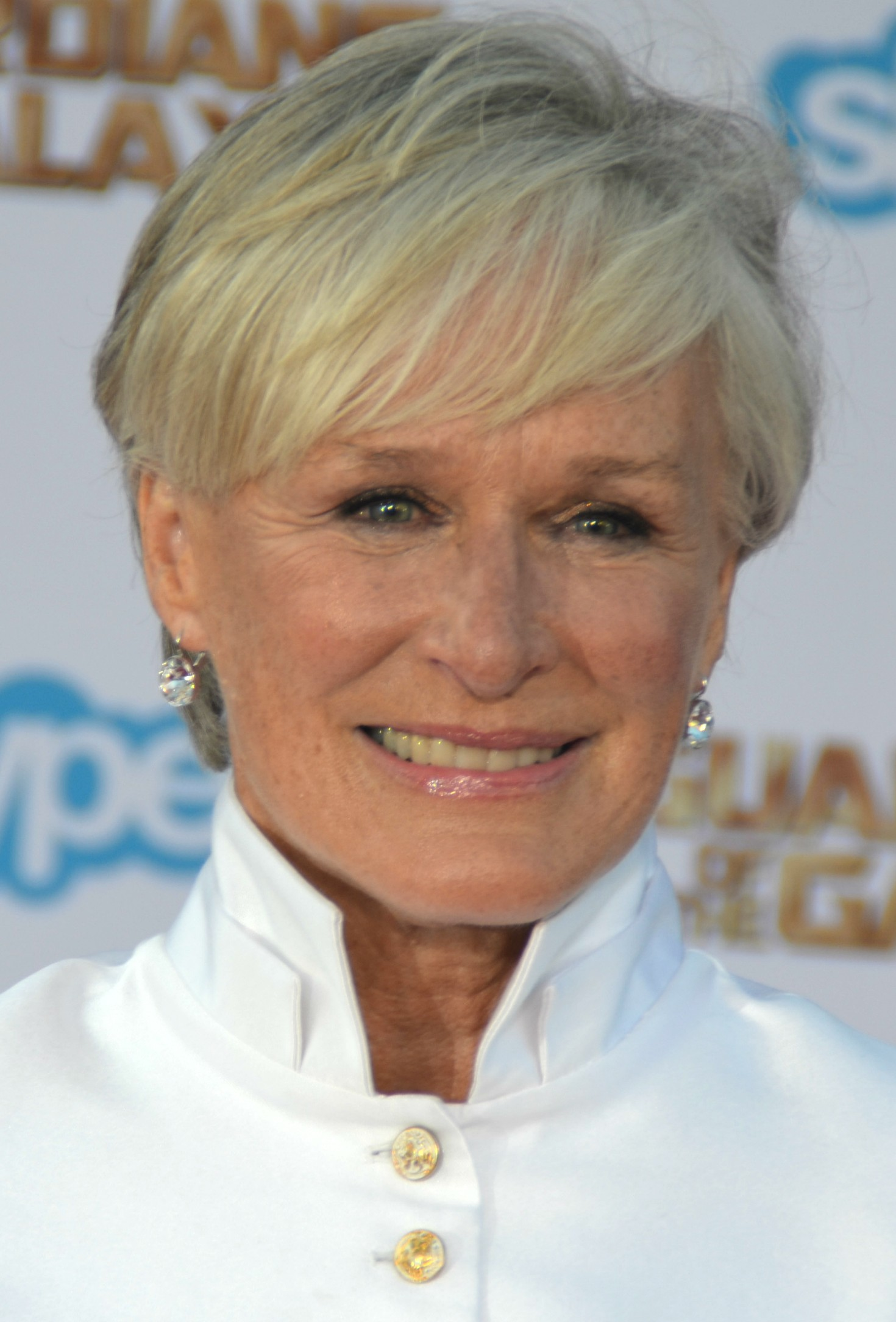
Glenn Close was convinced by show developer James L. Brooks to voice Mona Simpson, the mother of Homer Simpson.

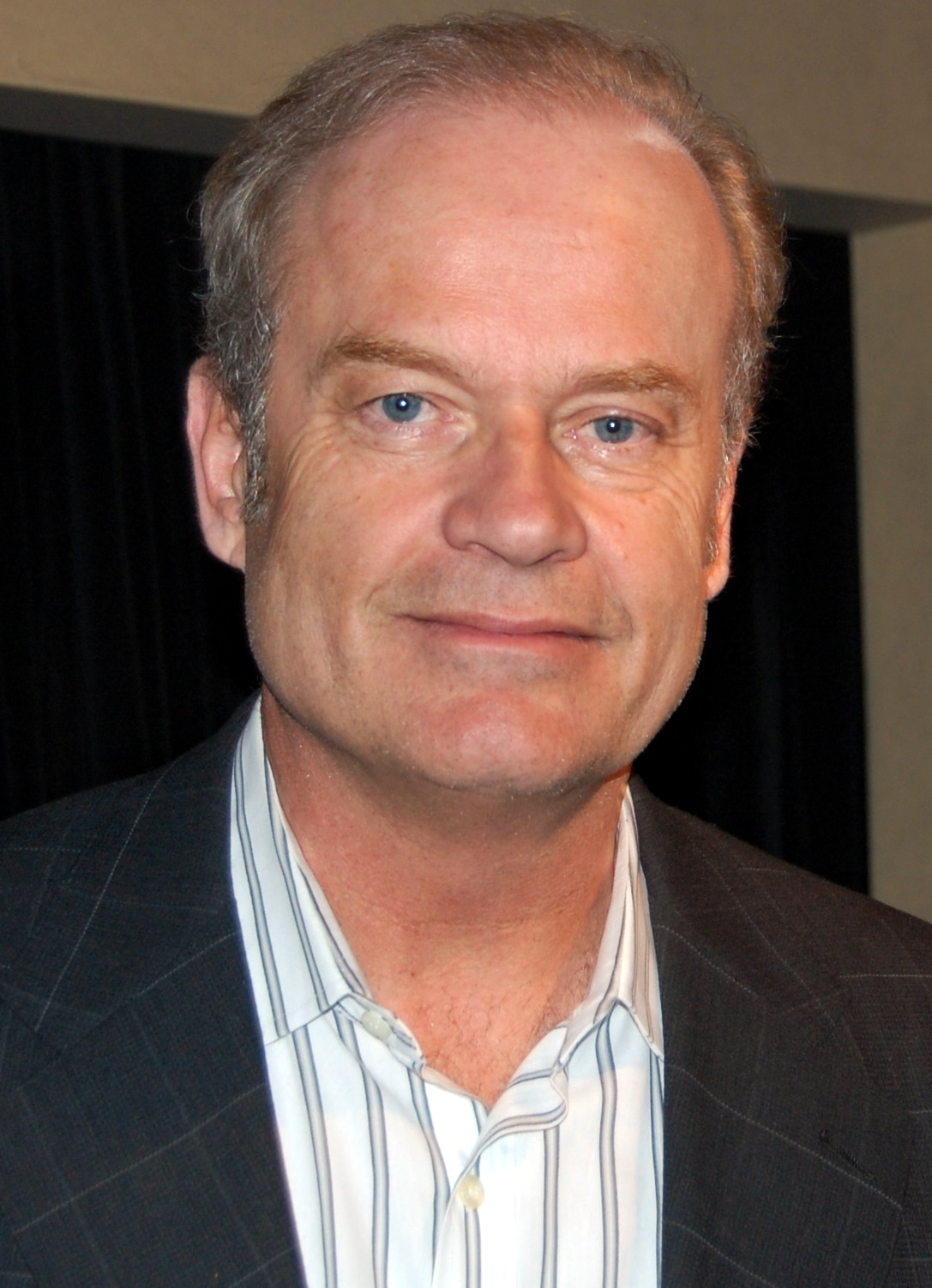
Actor Kelsey Grammer has voiced Sideshow Bob since the show's first season.

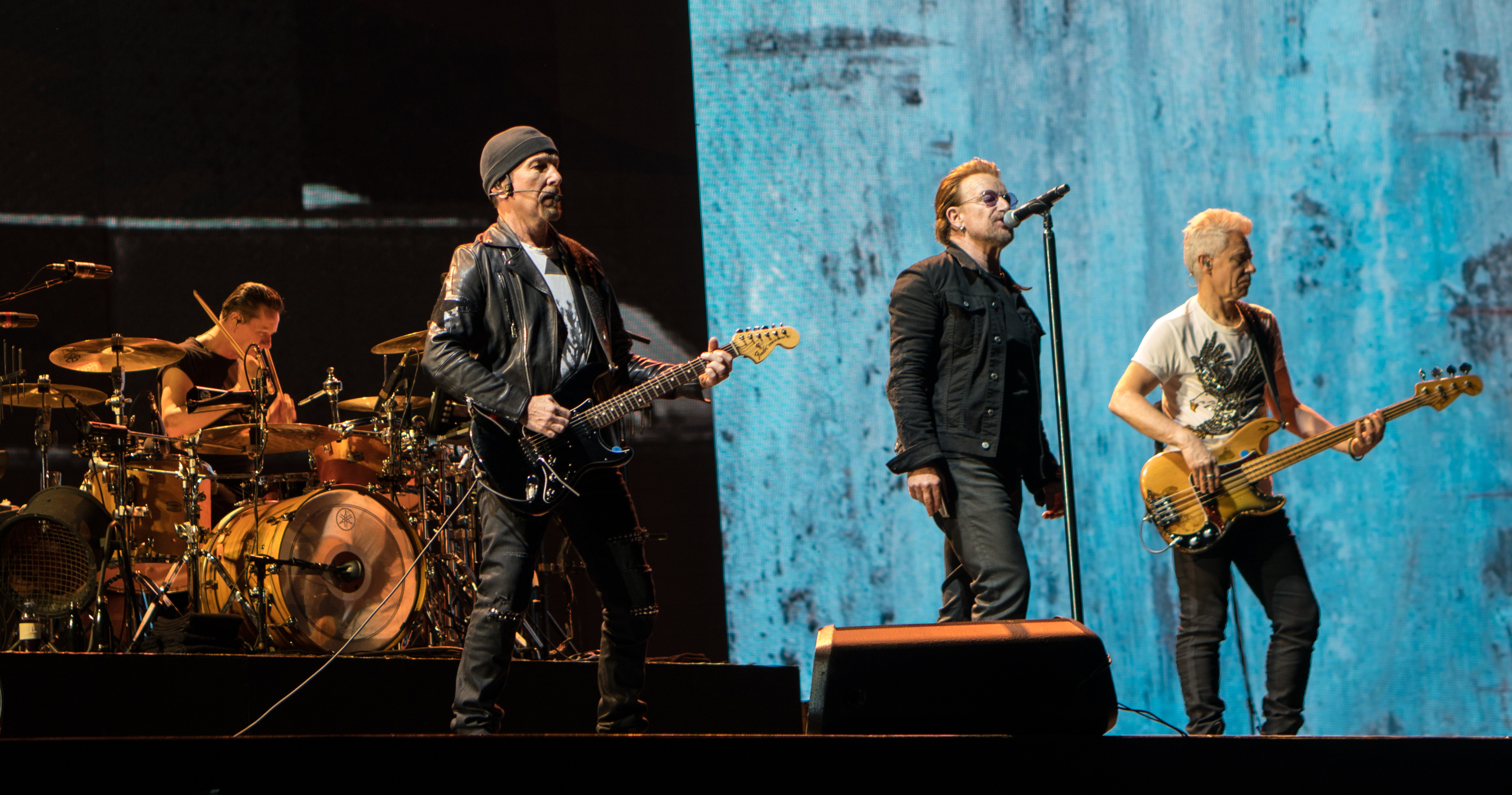
U2 played themselves in "Trash of the Titans", minus Larry Mullen Jr.

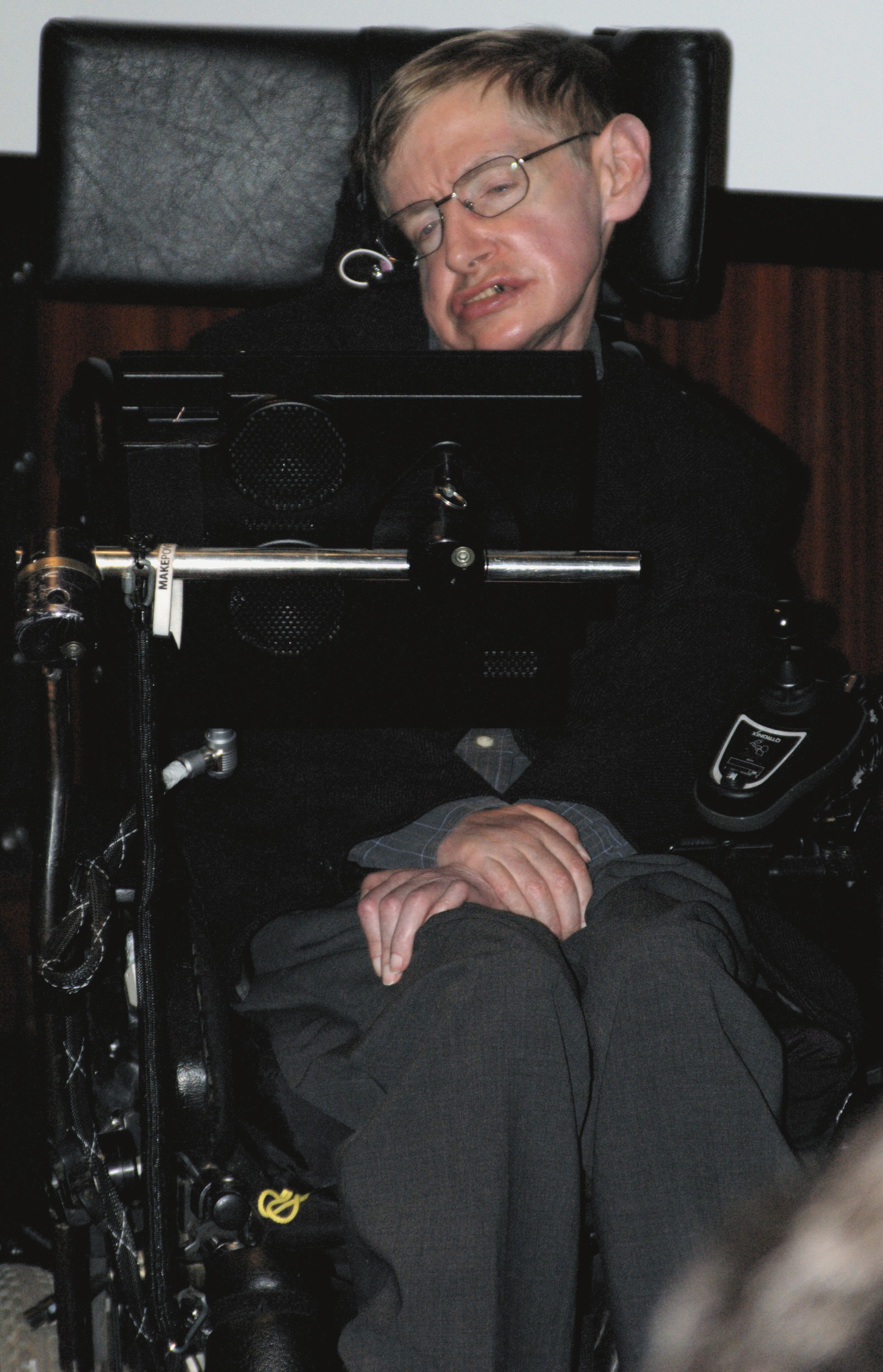
Theoretical physicist Stephen Hawking has made four appearances on the show as himself.

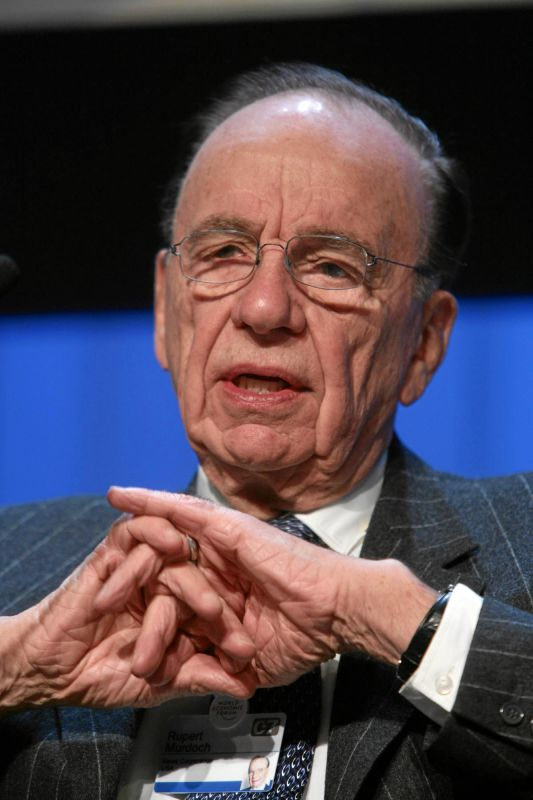
News Corporation founder Rupert Murdoch has featured in two episodes.

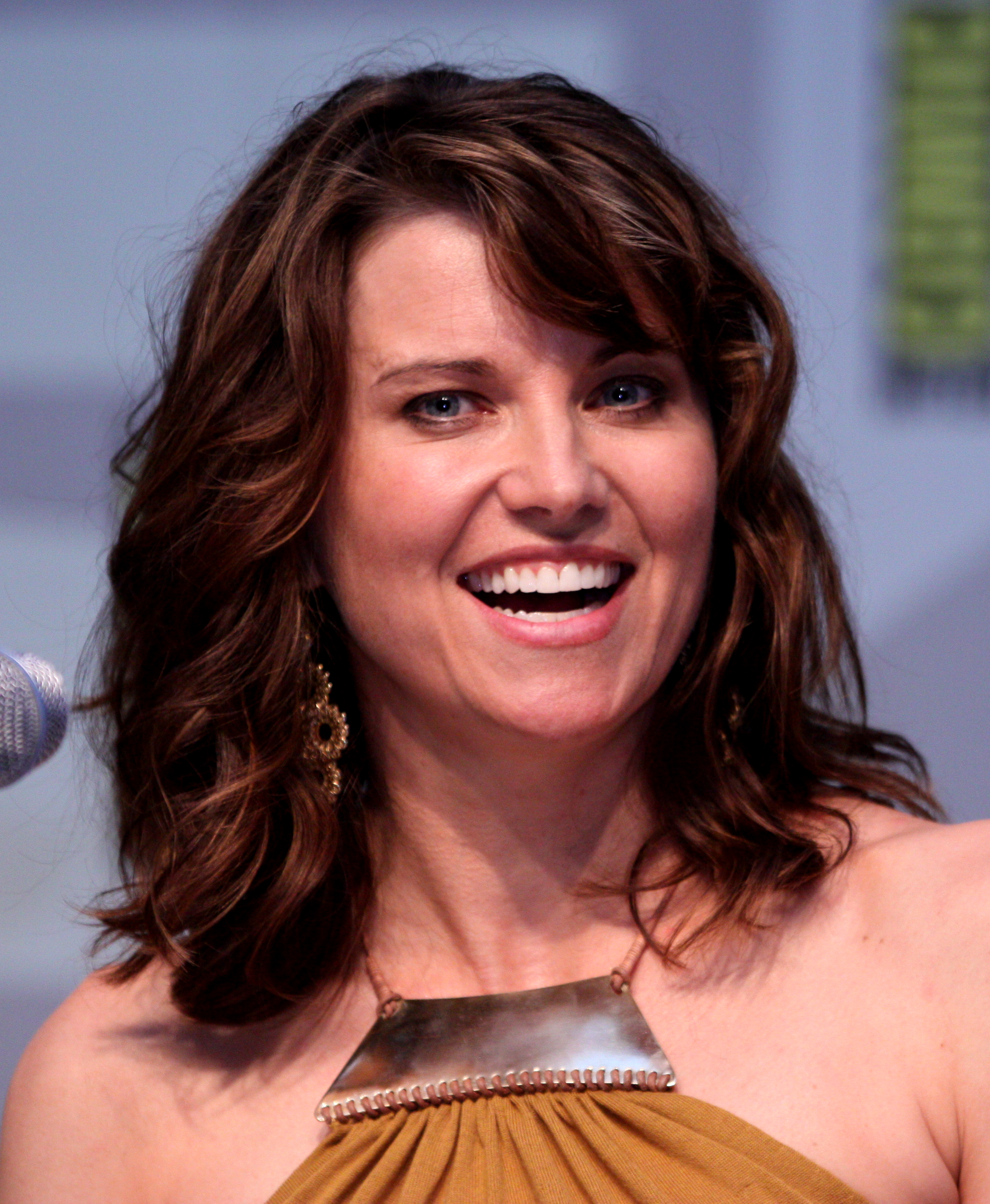
Actress Lucy Lawless appeared as herself in season 11.

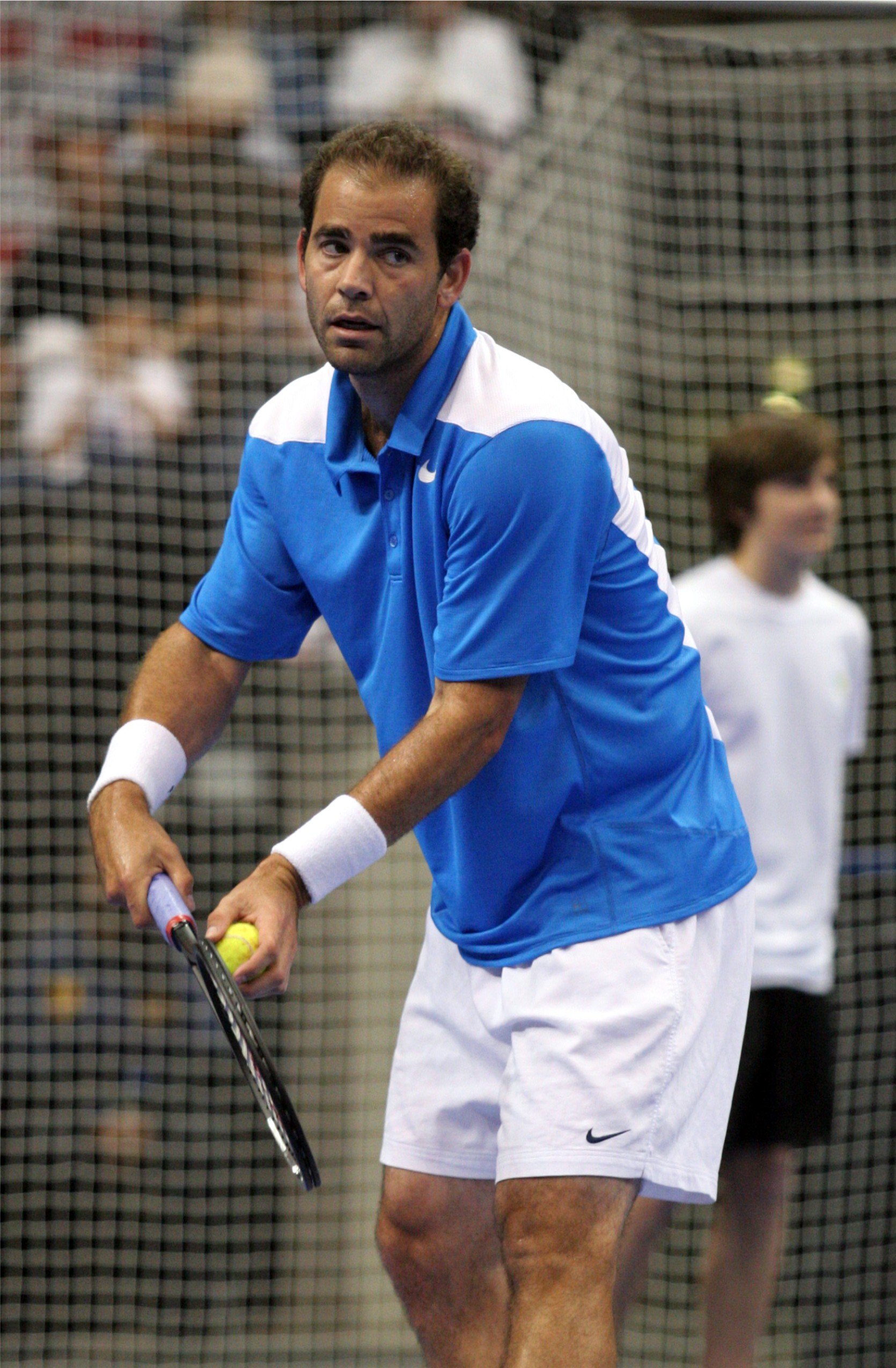
Pete Sampras was one of a number of tennis players to appear in "Tennis the Menace".

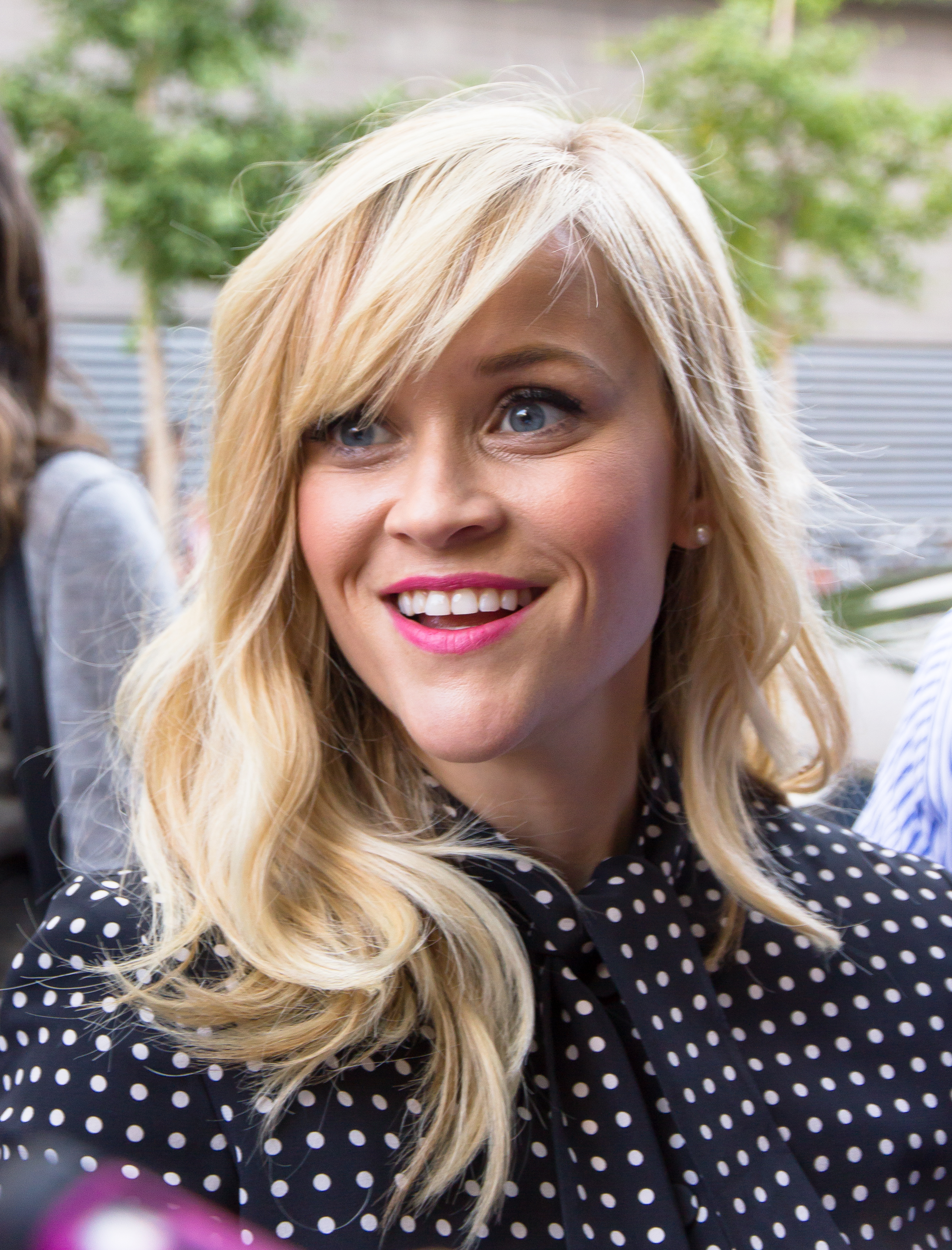
Actress Reese Witherspoon voiced Greta Wolfcastle.

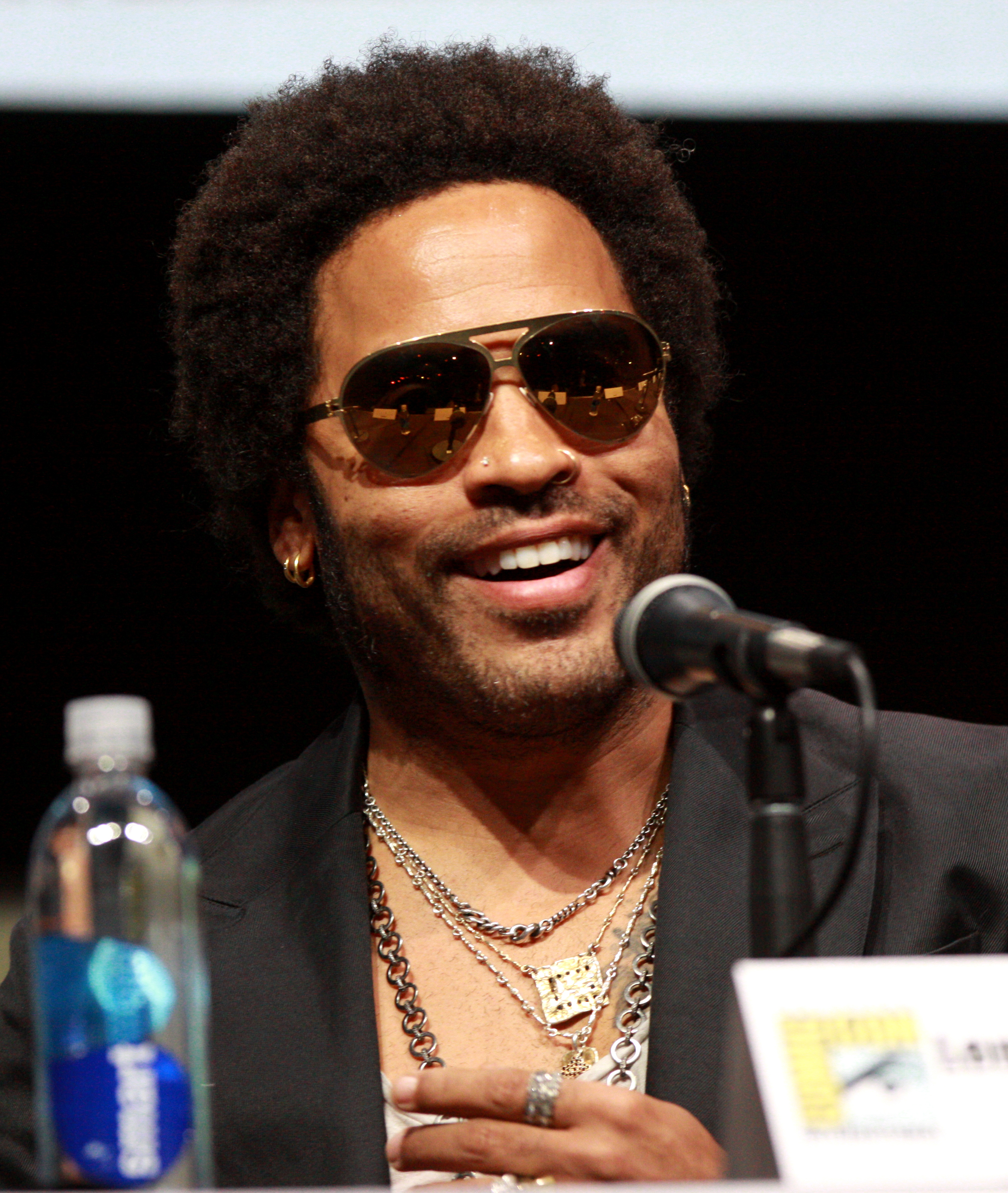
"How I Spent My Strummer Vacation" featured Lenny Kravitz and five other musicians.

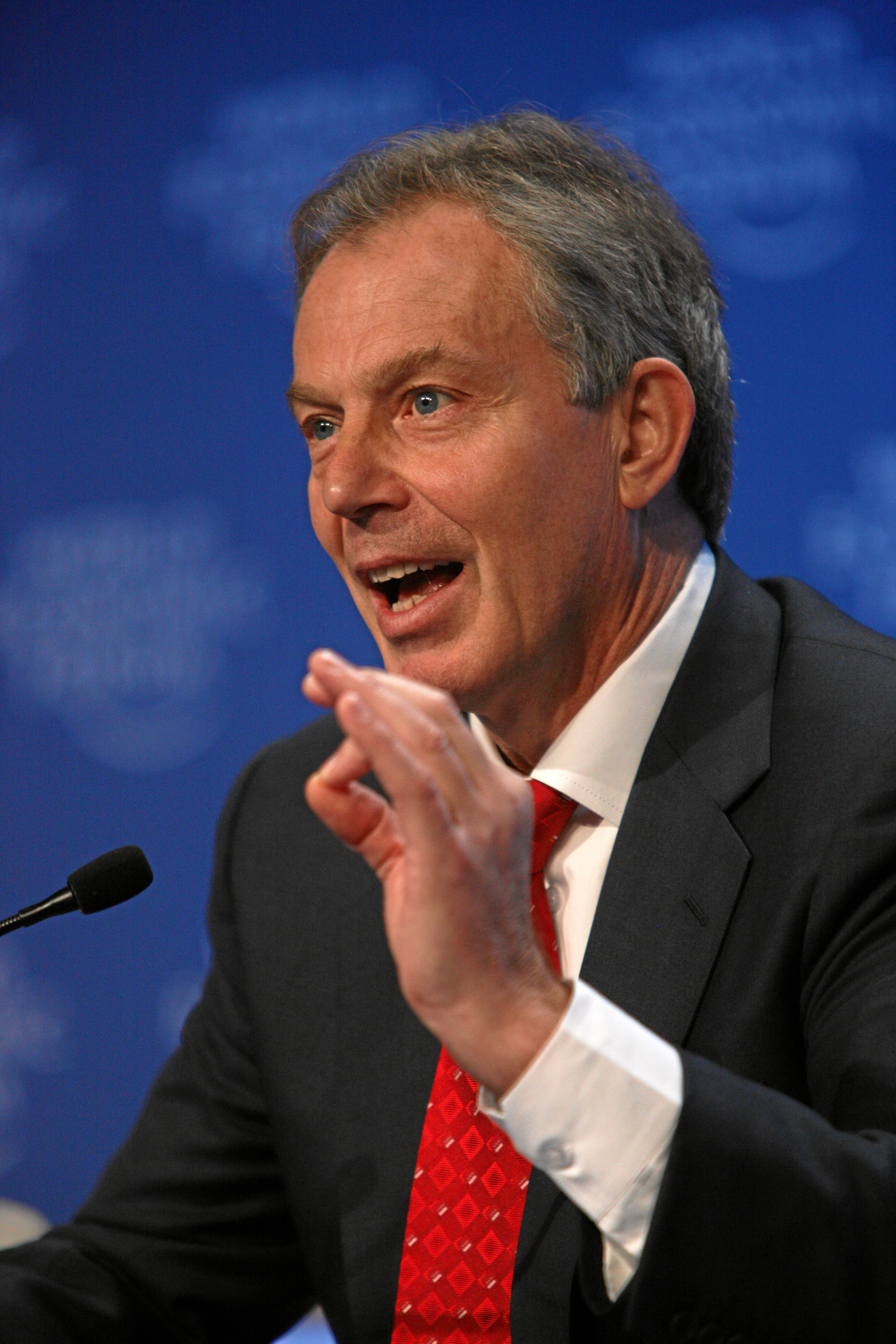
Then Prime Minister of the United Kingdom Tony Blair recorded his part for "The Regina Monologues" at Downing Street and his appearance on the show was used as an opportunity to "promote Britain".

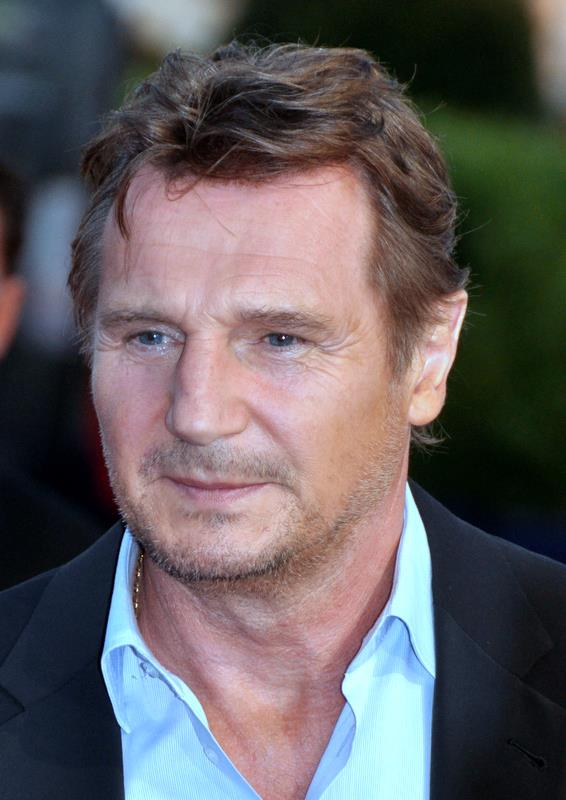
Actor Liam Neeson voiced priest Father Sean.

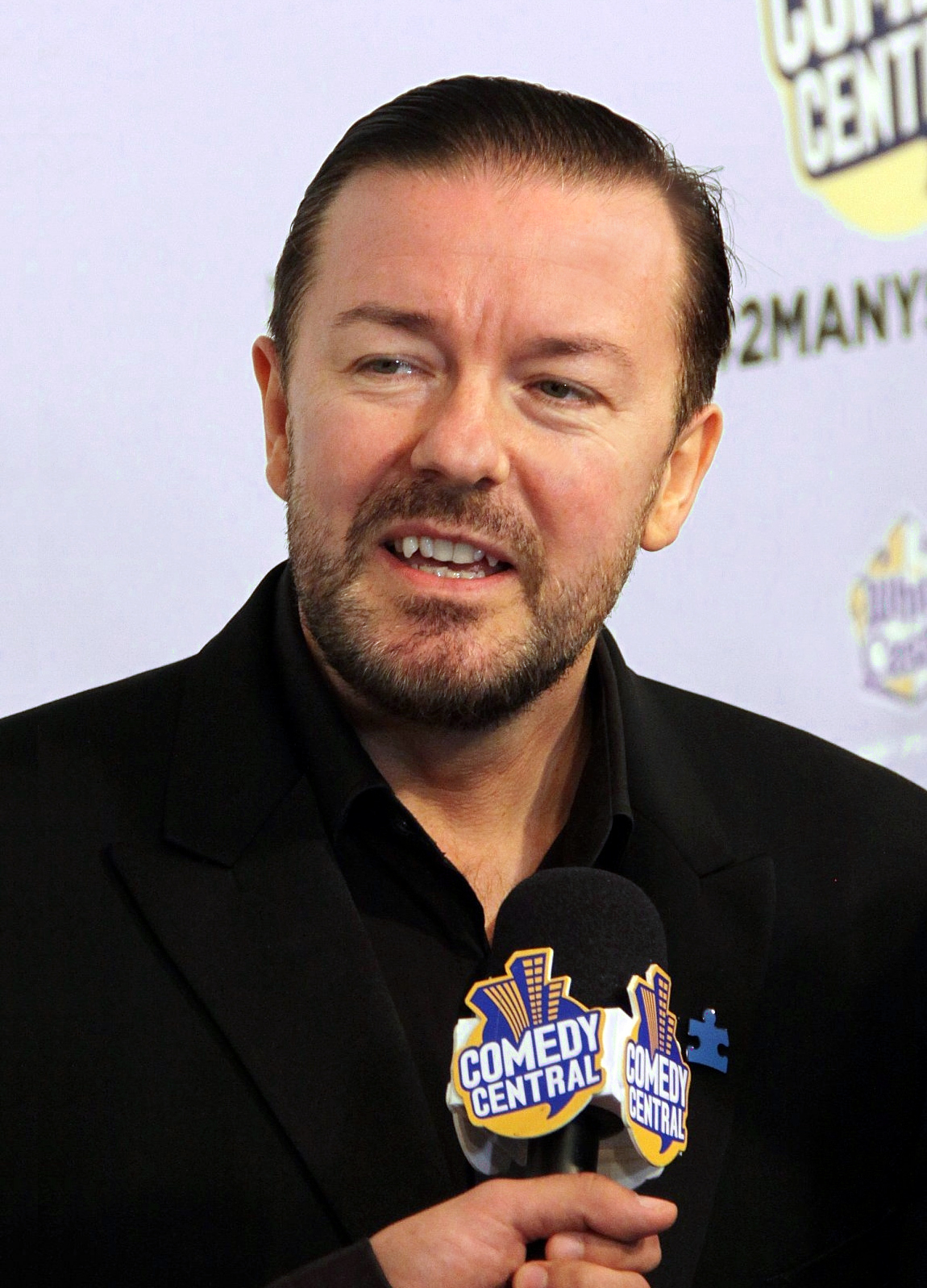
Comedian Ricky Gervais has appeared twice; he wrote "Homer Simpson, This is Your Wife", his first episode.

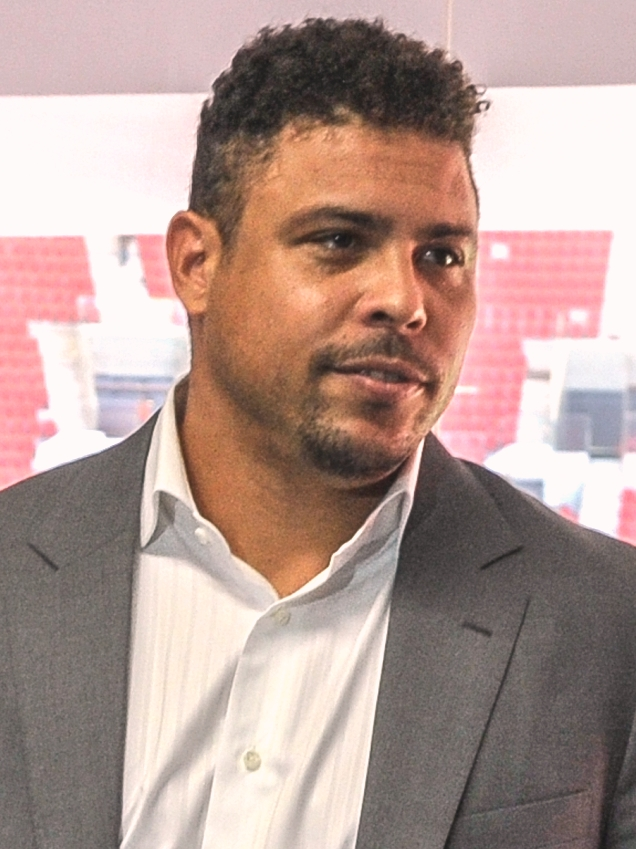
Ronaldo is the only soccer player to appear on the show.

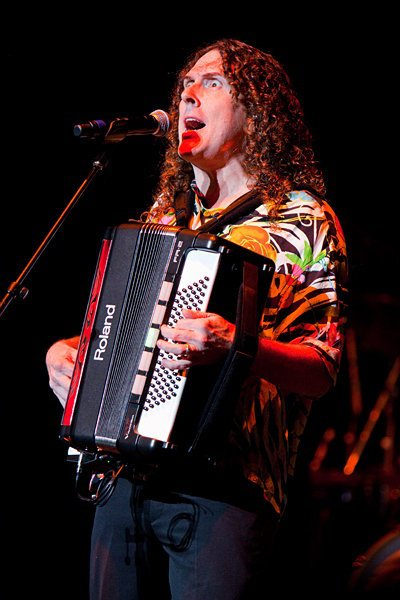
Musician "Weird Al" Yankovic has appeared three times.

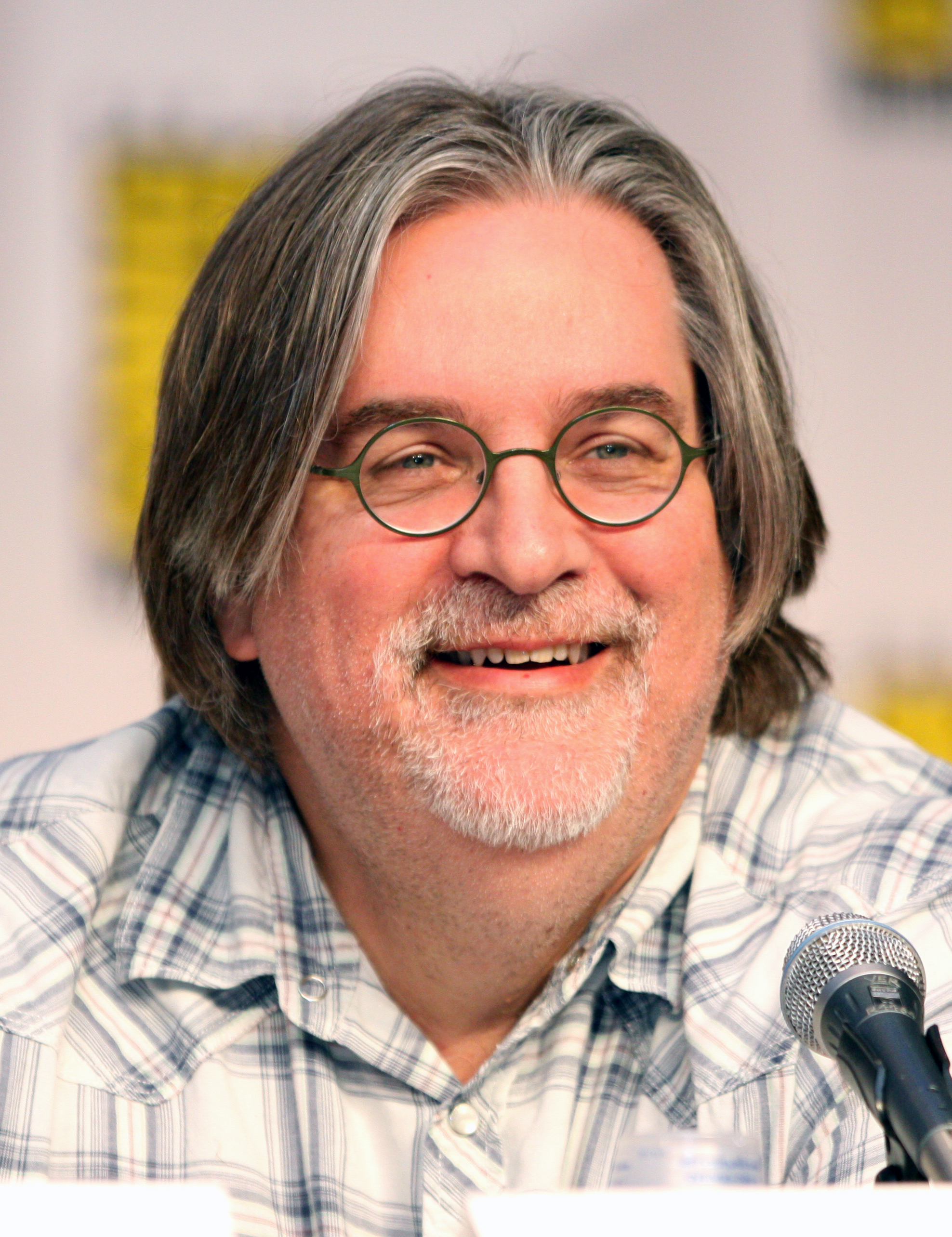
Matt Groening, the show's creator, has voiced himself twice.

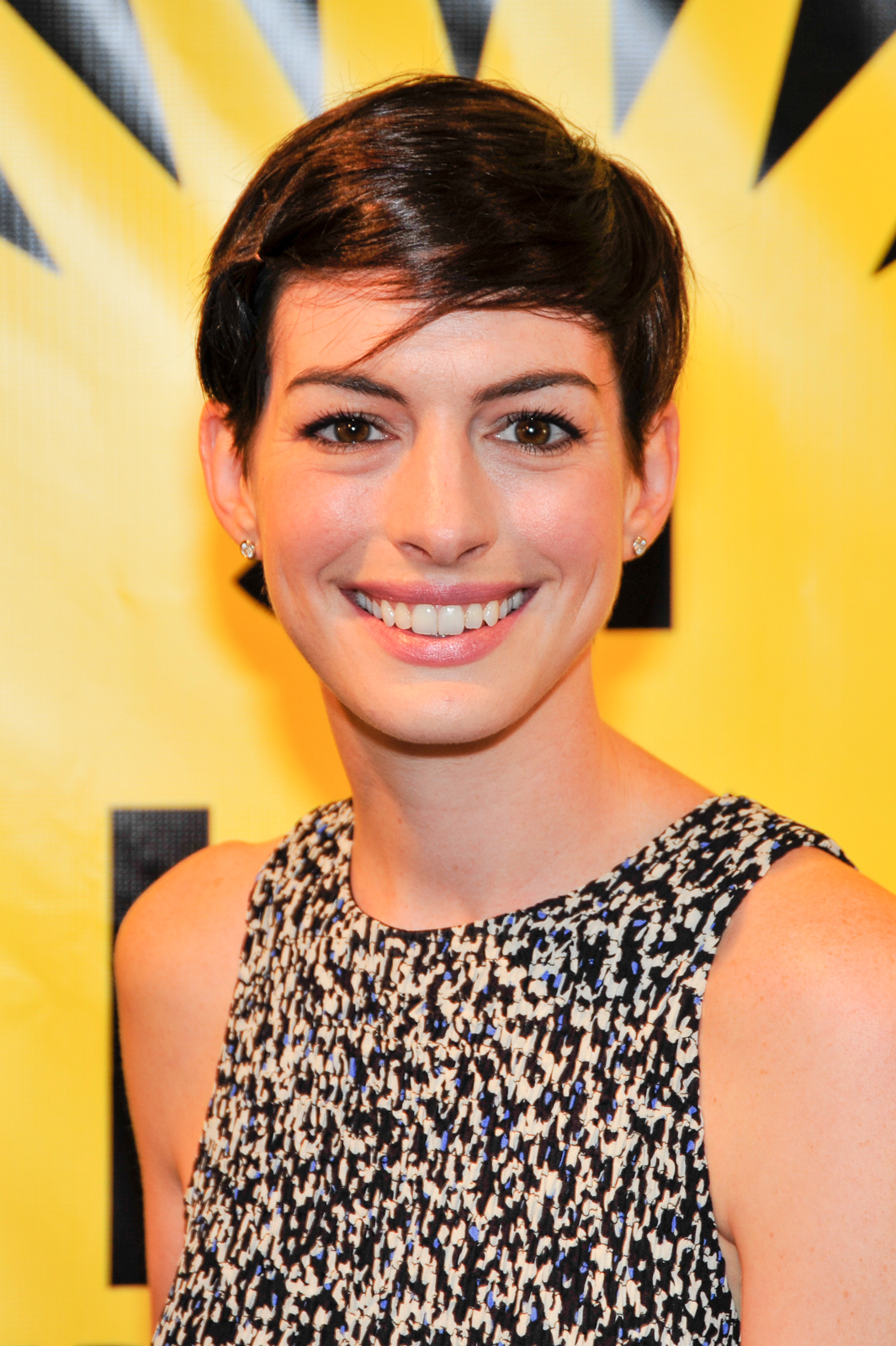
Actress Anne Hathaway won a Primetime Emmy Award for her role in "Once Upon a Time in Springfield".

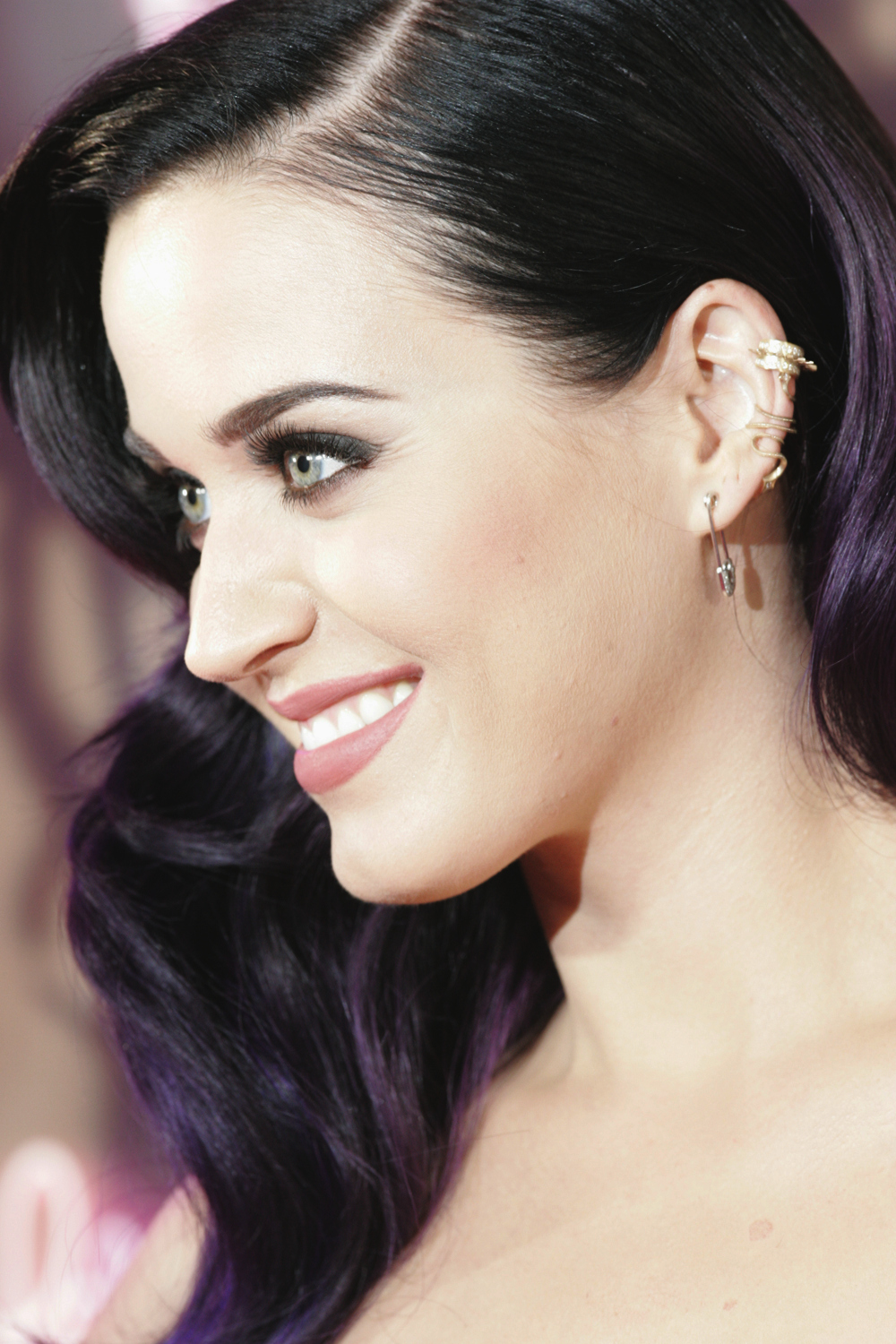
Singer Katy Perry appeared in live-action in "The Fight Before Christmas".

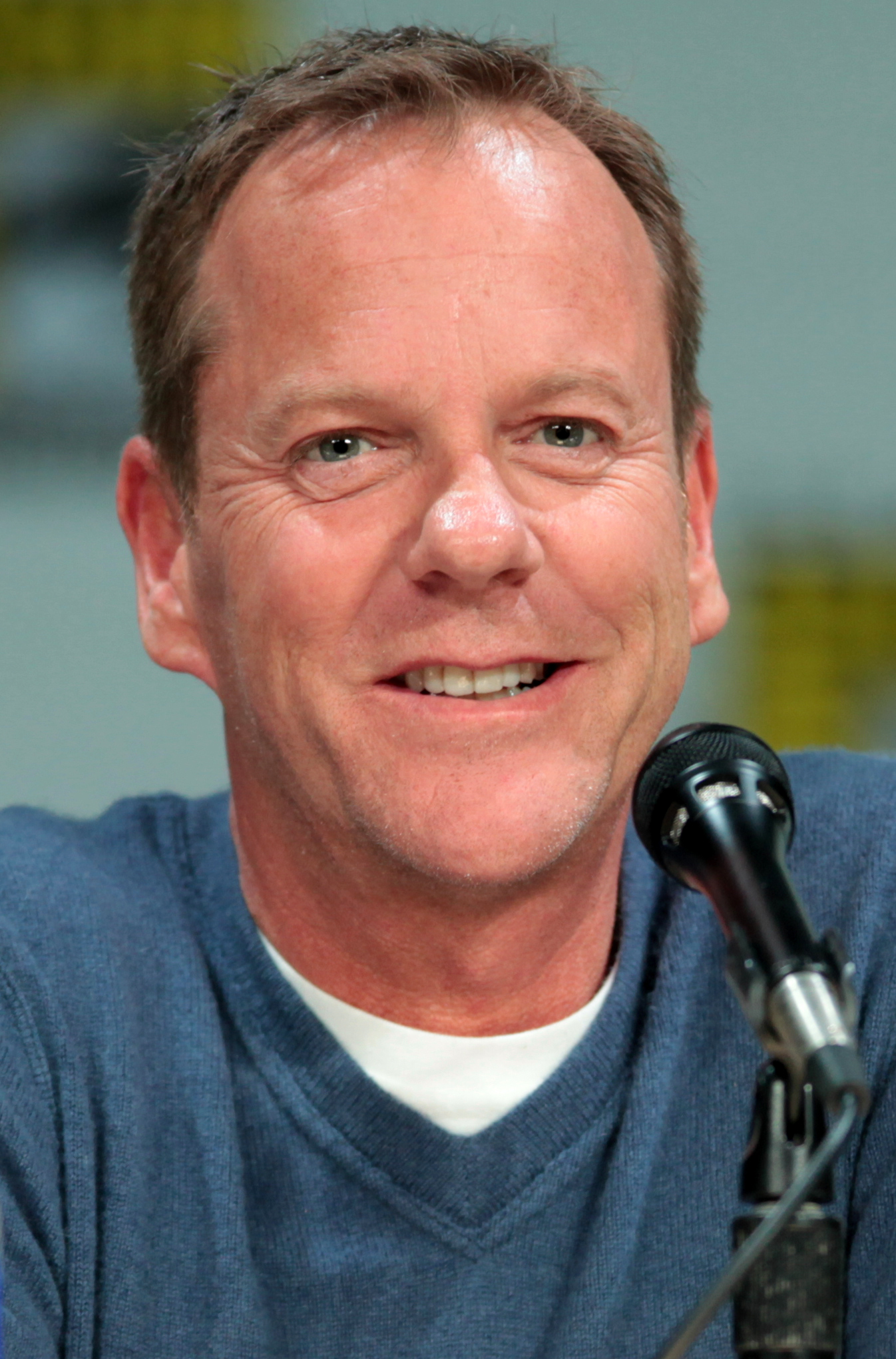
Actor Kiefer Sutherland has voiced three characters on the show, including Jack Bauer from 24.

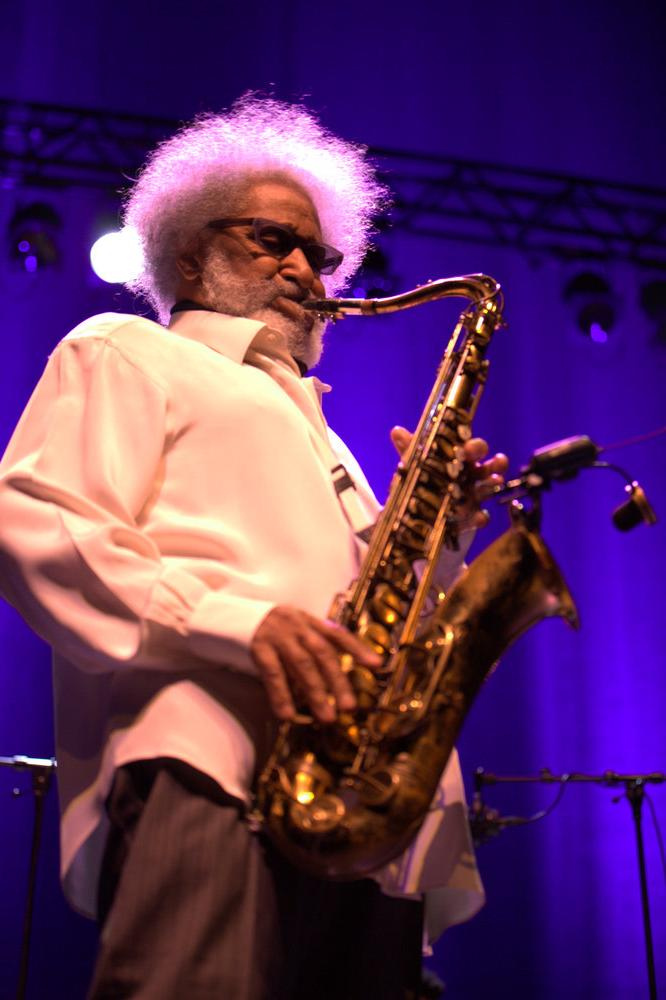
Jazz musician Sonny Rollins voiced himself in "Whiskey Business".

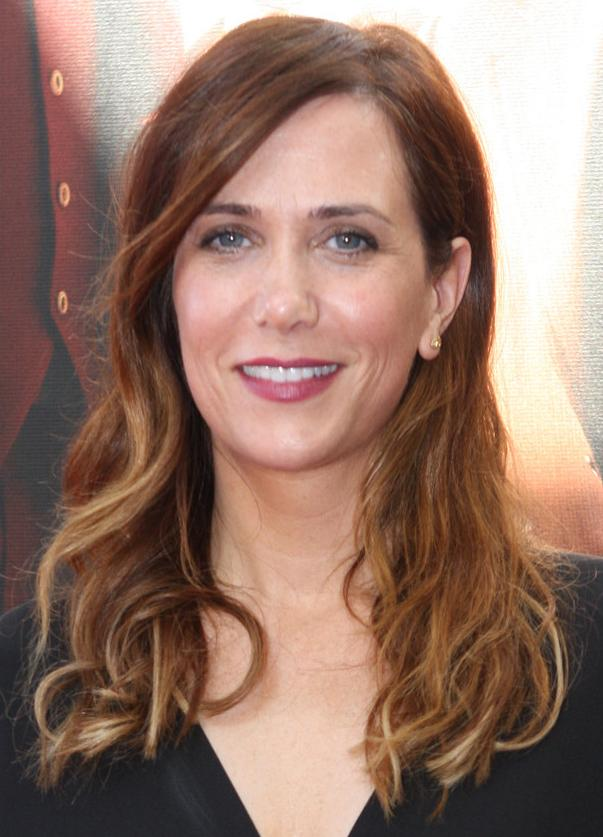
Actress Kristen Wiig has played two different characters on the show.

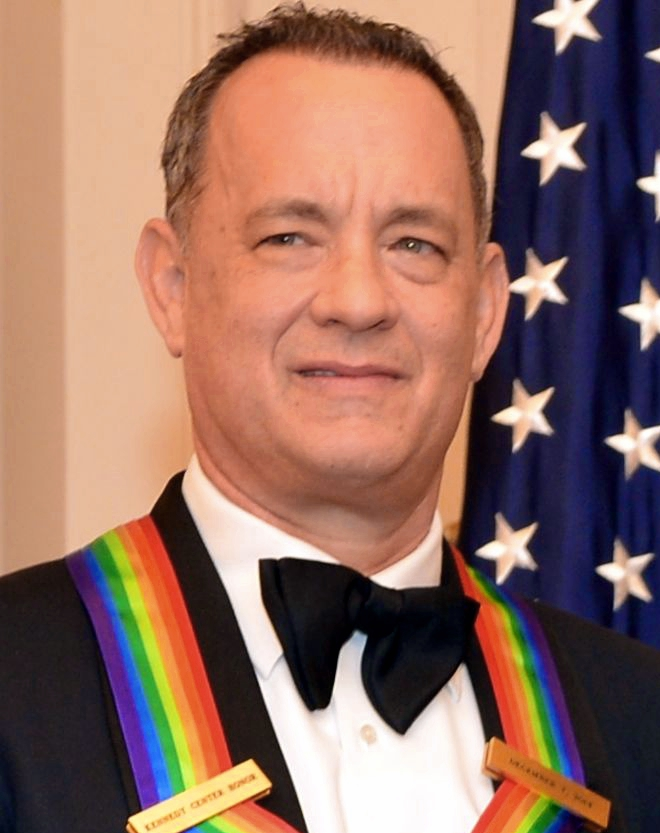
Actor Tom Hanks played himself in both The Simpsons Movie and in the Season 36 premiere episode "Bart's Birthday".

Season	Guest star	Role(s)	No.	Prod. code	Episode title
1	Marcia Wallace	Edna Krabappel; Ms. Melon	002–102	7G02	"Bart the Genius"
1	Sam McMurray	Worker	003–103	7G03	"Homer's Odyssey"
1	Marcia Wallace	Edna Krabappel	003–103	7G03	"Homer's Odyssey"
1	Miriam Flynn	Ms. Barr	006–106	7G06	"Moaning Lisa"
1	Ron Taylor	Bleeding Gums Murphy	006–106	7G06	"Moaning Lisa"
1	Albert Brooks^{[B]}	Cowboy Bob	007–107	7G09	"The Call of the Simpsons"
1	Marcia Wallace	Edna Krabappel	008–108	7G07	"The Telltale Head"
1	Albert Brooks	Jacques	009–109	7G11	"Life on the Fast Lane"
1	Sam McMurray	Gulliver Dark	010–110	7G10	"Homer's Night Out"
1	Christian Coffinet	Gendarme Officer	011–111	7G13	"The Crepes of Wrath"
1	Kelsey Grammer	Sideshow Bob	012–112	7G12	"Krusty Gets Busted"
1	June Foray	Babysitter service receptionist Doofy the Elf	013–113	7G01	"Some Enchanted Evening"
1	Penny Marshall	Ms. Botz / Lucille Botzcowski	013–113	7G01	"Some Enchanted Evening"
1	Paul Willson	Florist	013–113	7G01	"Some Enchanted Evening"
2	Marcia Wallace	Edna Krabappel	014–201	7F03	"Bart Gets an 'F'"
2	Harvey Fierstein	Karl	015–202	7F02	"Simpson and Delilah"
2	James Earl Jones	Removal man Serak the Preparer; Narrator	016–203	7F04	"Treehouse of Horror"
2	Tony Bennett	Himself	018–205	7F05	"Dancin' Homer"
2	Daryl Coley	Bleeding Gums Murphy	018–205	7F05	"Dancin' Homer"
2	Ken Levine	Dan Horde	018–205	7F05	"Dancin' Homer"
2	Tom Poston	Capital City Goofball	018–205	7F05	"Dancin' Homer"
2	Greg Berg	Rory; Eddie; Radio voice "Hooray for Everything" Announcer; Security Man	020–207	7F07	"Bart vs. Thanksgiving"
2	Carol Kane	Maggie Simpson	020–207	7F07	"Bart vs. Thanksgiving"
2	Alex Rocco	Roger Meyers Jr.	022–209	7F09	"Itchy & Scratchy & Marge"
2	Phil Hartman	Lionel Hutz; Heaven	023–210	7F10	"Bart Gets Hit by a Car"
2	Larry King	Himself	024–211	7F11	"One Fish, Two Fish, Blowfish, Blue Fish"
2	Joey Miyashima	Toshiro	024–211	7F11	"One Fish, Two Fish, Blowfish, Blue Fish"
2	Sab Shimono	Master Sushi Chef	024–211	7F11	"One Fish, Two Fish, Blowfish, Blue Fish"
2	George Takei	Akira	024–211	7F11	"One Fish, Two Fish, Blowfish, Blue Fish"
2	Diana Tanaka	Hostess	024–211	7F11	"One Fish, Two Fish, Blowfish, Blue Fish"
2	Jon Lovitz	Artie Ziff; Mr. Seckofsky	025–212	7F12	"The Way We Was"
2	Phil Hartman	Troy McClure; Moses; Cable guy	026–213	7F13	"Homer vs. Lisa and the 8th Commandment"
2	Marcia Wallace	Edna Krabappel	027–214	7F15	"Principal Charming"
2	Danny DeVito	Herbert Powell	028–215	7F16	"Oh Brother, Where Art Thou?"
2	Tracey Ullman	Emily Winthropp; Sylvia Winfield	029–216	7F14	"Bart's Dog Gets an 'F'"
2	Frank Welker	Santa's Little Helper; Additional dog voices	029–216	7F14	"Bart's Dog Gets an 'F'"
2	Phil Hartman	Lionel Hutz; Plato	030–217	7F17	"Old Money"
2	Audrey Meadows	Bea Simmons	030–217	7F17	"Old Money"
2	Marcia Wallace	Edna Krabappel	030–217	7F17	"Old Money"
2	Jon Lovitz	Professor Lombardo	031–218	7F18	"Brush with Greatness"
2	Ringo Starr	Himself	031–218	7F18	"Brush with Greatness"
2	Dustin Hoffman^{[C]}	Mr. Bergstrom	032–219	7F19	"Lisa's Substitute"
2	Marcia Wallace	Edna Krabappel	032–219	7F19	"Lisa's Substitute"
2	Cloris Leachman	Mrs. Glick	034–221	7F21	"Three Men and a Comic Book"
2	Daniel Stern	Narrator	034–221	7F21	"Three Men and a Comic Book"
3	Michael Jackson^{[D]}	Leon Kompowsky	036–301	7F24	"Stark Raving Dad"
3	Kipp Lennon	Leon Kompowsky's singing voice	036–301	7F24	"Stark Raving Dad"
3	Neil Patrick Harris	Himself playing Bart Simpson	039–304	8F03	"Bart the Murderer"
3	Phil Hartman	Lionel Hutz; Troy McClure; Joey; Godfather	039–304	8F03	"Bart the Murderer"
3	Joe Mantegna	Fat Tony; Himself playing Fat Tony	039–304	8F03	"Bart the Murderer"
3	Marcia Wallace	Edna Krabappel	039–304	8F03	"Bart the Murderer"
3	Chick Hearn	Himself	040–305	8F04	"Homer Defined"
3	Magic Johnson	Himself	040–305	8F04	"Homer Defined"
3	Jon Lovitz	Aristotle Amadopolis; Mr. Devaro	040–305	8F04	"Homer Defined"
3	Jackie Mason	Rabbi Hyman Krustofsky	041–306	8F05	"Like Father, Like Clown"
3	Marcia Wallace	Edna Krabappel	042–307	8F02	"Treehouse of Horror II"
3	Marcia Wallace	Edna Krabappel	043–308	8F06	"Lisa's Pony"
3	Frank Welker	Princess	043–308	8F06	"Lisa's Pony"
3	Phil Hartman	Troy McClure	044–309	8F07	"Saturdays of Thunder"
3	Larry McKay	Announcer	044–309	8F07	"Saturdays of Thunder"
3	Aerosmith^{[E]}	Themselves	045–310	8F08	"Flaming Moe's"
3	Phil Hartman	Lionel Hutz	045–310	8F08	"Flaming Moe's"
3	Kipp Lennon	Sings "Flaming Moe's" (parody of the Cheers theme song)	045–310	8F08	"Flaming Moe's"
3	Marcia Wallace	Edna Krabappel	045–310	8F08	"Flaming Moe's"
3	Phil Hartman	Horst; Stockbroker	046–311	8F09	"Burns Verkaufen der Kraftwerk"
3	Sting	Himself	048–313	8F11	"Radio Bart"
3	Marcia Wallace	Edna Krabappel	048–313	8F11	"Radio Bart"
3	Phil Hartman	Troy McClure; Smooth Jimmy Apollo	049–314	8F12	"Lisa the Greek"
3	Phil Hartman	Troy McClure	050–315	8F14	"Homer Alone"
3	Marcia Wallace	Edna Krabappel	051–316	8F16	"Bart the Lover"
3	Wade Boggs	Himself	052–317	8F13	"Homer at the Bat"
3	Jose Canseco	Himself	052–317	8F13	"Homer at the Bat"
3	Roger Clemens	Himself	052–317	8F13	"Homer at the Bat"
3	Terry Cashman	Sings "Talkin' Softball" (parody of the song Talkin' Baseball)	052–317	8F13	"Homer at the Bat"
3	Ken Griffey Jr.	Himself	052–317	8F13	"Homer at the Bat"
3	Don Mattingly	Himself	052–317	8F13	"Homer at the Bat"
3	Steve Sax	Himself	052–317	8F13	"Homer at the Bat"
3	Mike Scioscia	Himself	052–317	8F13	"Homer at the Bat"
3	Ozzie Smith	Himself	052–317	8F13	"Homer at the Bat"
3	Darryl Strawberry	Himself	052–317	8F13	"Homer at the Bat"
3	Steve Allen	Electronically altered voice of Bart	053–318	8F15	"Separate Vocations"
3	Marcia Wallace	Edna Krabappel	053–318	8F15	"Separate Vocations"
3	Frank Welker	Santa's Little Helper	054–319	8F17	"Dog of Death"
3	Beverly D'Angelo	Lurleen Lumpkin	055–320	8F19	"Colonel Homer"
3	Kelsey Grammer	Sideshow Bob	056–321	8F20	"Black Widower"
3	Christopher Guest	Nigel Tufnel	057–322	8F21	"The Otto Show"
3	Michael McKean	David St. Hubbins	057–322	8F21	"The Otto Show"
3	Phil Hartman	Troy McClure	058–323	8F22	"Bart's Friend Falls in Love"
3	Kimmy Robertson	Samantha Stanky	058–323	8F22	"Bart's Friend Falls in Love"
3	Marcia Wallace	Edna Krabappel	058–323	8F22	"Bart's Friend Falls in Love"
3	Danny DeVito	Herbert Powell	058–323	8F23	"Brother, Can You Spare Two Dimes?"
3	Joe Frazier	Himself	058–323	8F23	"Brother, Can You Spare Two Dimes?"
4	Gene Merlino	Sings "South of the Border"	060–401	8F24	"Kamp Krusty"
4	Marcia Wallace	Edna Krabappel	060–401	8F24	"Kamp Krusty"
4	Phil Hartman	Troy McClure; Lionel Hutz	061–402	8F18	"A Streetcar Named Marge"
4	Jon Lovitz	Llewellyn Sinclair; Ms. Sinclair	061–402	8F18	"A Streetcar Named Marge"
4	Bob Hope	Himself	063–404	9F02	"Lisa the Beauty Queen"
4	Marcia Wallace	Edna Krabappel	064–405	9F04	"Treehouse of Horror III"
4	Neil Armstrong (archival)	Himself	065–406	9F03	"Itchy & Scratchy: The Movie"
4	Marcia Wallace	Edna Krabappel	065–406	9F03	"Itchy & Scratchy: The Movie"
4	Phil Hartman	Troy McClure; Lionel Hutz	066–407	9F05	"Marge Gets a Job"
4	Tom Jones	Himself	066–407	9F05	"Marge Gets a Job"
4	Marcia Wallace	Edna Krabappel	066–407	9F05	"Marge Gets a Job"
4	Sara Gilbert	Laura Powers	067–408	9F06	"New Kid on the Block"
4	Phil Hartman	Lionel Hutz	067–408	9F06	"New Kid on the Block"
4	Pamela Reed	Ruth Powers	067–408	9F06	"New Kid on the Block"
4	Phil Hartman	Troy McClure	068–409	9F07	"Mr. Plow"
4	Linda Ronstadt	Herself	068–409	9F07	"Mr. Plow"
4	Adam West	Himself	068–409	9F07	"Mr. Plow"
4	Elizabeth Taylor	Maggie Simpson	069–410	9F08	"Lisa's First Word"
4	Phil Hartman	Lyle Lanley	071–412	9F10	"Marge vs. the Monorail"
4	Leonard Nimoy	Himself	071–412	9F10	"Marge vs. the Monorail"
4	Phil Hartman	Lionel Hutz; Troy McClure; Security Guard; Mandy Patinkin	072–413	9F11	"Selma's Choice"
4	Michele Pillar	Sings "A Natural Woman"	072–413	9F11	"Selma's Choice"
4	Phil Hartman	Tom; Eddie Muntz	073–414	9F12	"Brother from the Same Planet"
4	Marcia Wallace	Edna Krabappel	073–414	9F12	"Brother from the Same Planet"
4	Michael Carrington	Krusty Anniversary Show Announcer; Sideshow Raheem	074–415	9F13	"I Love Lisa"
4	Phil Hartman	Troy McClure; Lionel Hutz	075–416	9F14	"Duffless"
4	Kipp Lennon	Sings "Raindrops Keep Fallin' on My Head"	075–416	9F14	"Duffless"
4	Marcia Wallace	Edna Krabappel	075–416	9F14	"Duffless"
4	Joyce Brothers	Herself	076–417	9F15	"Last Exit to Springfield"
4	Brooke Shields	Herself	078–419	9F16	"The Front"
4	Gene Merlino	Sings "Born Free"	079–420	9F18	"Whacking Day"
4	Barry White	Himself	079–420	9F18	"Whacking Day"
4	David Crosby	Himself	080–421	9F20	"Marge in Chains"
4	Phil Hartman	Troy McClure; Lionel Hutz	080–421	9F20	"Marge in Chains"
4	Johnny Carson	Himself	081–422	9F19	"Krusty Gets Kancelled"
4	Hugh Hefner	Himself	081–422	9F19	"Krusty Gets Kancelled"
4	Bette Midler	Herself	081–422	9F19	"Krusty Gets Kancelled"
4	Luke Perry	Himself	081–422	9F19	"Krusty Gets Kancelled"
4	Red Hot Chili Peppers^{[F]}	Themselves	081–422	9F19	"Krusty Gets Kancelled"
4	Elizabeth Taylor	Herself	081–422	9F19	"Krusty Gets Kancelled"
4	Marcia Wallace	Edna Krabappel	081–422	9F19	"Krusty Gets Kancelled"
4	Barry White	Himself	081–422	9F19	"Krusty Gets Kancelled"
5	David Crosby	Himself	082–501	9F21	"Homer's Barbershop Quartet"
5	The Dapper Dans^{[G]}	The singing voices of the Be Sharps	082–501	9F21	"Homer's Barbershop Quartet"
5	George Harrison	Himself	082–501	9F21	"Homer's Barbershop Quartet"
5	Kelsey Grammer	Sideshow Bob	083–502	9F22	"Cape Feare"
5	Marcia Wallace	Edna Krabappel	083–502	9F22	"Cape Feare"
5	Ramones^{[H]}	Themselves	085–504	1F01	"Rosebud"
5	Phil Hartman	Lionel Hutz	086–505	1F04	"Treehouse of Horror IV"
5	Frank Welker	Gremlin	086–505	1F04	"Treehouse of Horror IV"
5	George Fenneman	Narrator	086–505	1F03	"Marge on the Lam"
5	Phil Hartman	Troy McClure; Lionel Hutz	086–505	1F03	"Marge on the Lam"
5	Pamela Reed	Ruth Powers; Truck-stop Waitress	086–505	1F03	"Marge on the Lam"
5	Albert Brooks	Brad Goodman	088–507	1F05	"Bart's Inner Child"
5	James Brown	Himself	088–507	1F05	"Bart's Inner Child"
5	Phil Hartman	Troy McClure	088–507	1F05	"Bart's Inner Child"
5	Marcia Wallace	Edna Krabappel	088–507	1F05	"Bart's Inner Child"
5	Ernest Borgnine	Himself	089–508	1F06	"Boy-Scoutz 'n the Hood"
5	Marcia Wallace	Edna Krabappel	089–508	1F06	"Boy-Scoutz 'n the Hood"
5	Phil Hartman	Lionel Hutz	091–510	1F08	"The Last Temptation of Homer"
5	Werner Klemperer	Colonel Klink	091–510	1F08	"The Last Temptation of Homer"
5	Michelle Pfeiffer	Mindy Simmons	091–510	1F08	"The Last Temptation of Homer"
5	Marcia Wallace	Edna Krabappel	091–510	1F08	"The Last Temptation of Homer"
5	Gerry Cooney	Himself	091–510	1F08	"$pringfield (Or, How I Learned to Stop Worrying and Love Legalized Gambling)"
5	Robert Goulet	Himself	091–510	1F08	"$pringfield (Or, How I Learned to Stop Worrying and Love Legalized Gambling)"
5	Sam Neill	Molloy	092–511	1F09	"Homer the Vigilante"
5	Conan O'Brien	Himself	093–512	1F11	"Bart Gets Famous"
5	Marcia Wallace	Edna Krabappel	093–512	1F11	"Bart Gets Famous"
5	Michael Carrington	Black comedian	094–513	1F10	"Homer and Apu"
5	James Woods	Himself	094–513	1F10	"Homer and Apu"
5	Kathleen Turner	Stacy Lovell	095–514	1F12	"Lisa vs. Malibu Stacy"
5	Buzz Aldrin	Himself	096–515	1F13	"Deep Space Homer"
5	James Taylor	Himself	096–515	1F13	"Deep Space Homer"
5	Phil Hartman	Lionel Hutz	099–518	1F16	"Burns' Heir"
5	Marcia Wallace	Edna Krabappel	100–519	1F18	"Sweet Seymour Skinner's Baadasssss Song"
5	Frank Welker	Santa's Little Helper	100–519	1F18	"Sweet Seymour Skinner's Baadasssss Song"
5	Phil Hartman	Lionel Hutz	101–520	1F19	"The Boy Who Knew Too Much"
5	Marcia Wallace	Edna Krabappel	101–520	1F19	"The Boy Who Knew Too Much"
5	Phil Hartman	Troy McClure	102–521	1F21	"Lady Bouvier's Lover"
5	Kipp Lennon	Sings "The Sound of Grampa" (parody of the song The Sound of Silence)	102–521	1F21	"Lady Bouvier's Lover"
5	Phil Hartman	Lionel Hutz	103–522	1F20	"Secrets of a Successful Marriage"
5	Marcia Wallace	Edna Krabappel	103–522	1F20	"Secrets of a Successful Marriage"
6	Winona Ryder	Allison Taylor	105–602	1F17	"Lisa's Rival"
6	Henry Corden	Fred Flintstone	108–605	2F02	"Sideshow Bob Roberts"
6	Dr. Demento	Himself	108–605	2F02	"Sideshow Bob Roberts"
6	Kelsey Grammer	Sideshow Bob	108–605	2F02	"Sideshow Bob Roberts"
6	Phil Hartman	Lionel Hutz	108–605	2F02	"Sideshow Bob Roberts"
6	Larry King	Himself	108–605	2F02	"Sideshow Bob Roberts"
6	Marcia Wallace	Edna Krabappel	108–605	2F02	"Sideshow Bob Roberts"
6	James Earl Jones	Alternate Universe Maggie Simpson	109–606	2F03	"Treehouse of Horror V"
6	Marcia Wallace	Edna Krabappel	109–606	2F03	"Treehouse of Horror V"
6	Meryl Streep	Jessica Lovejoy	110–607	2F04	"Bart's Girlfriend"
6	Marcia Wallace	Edna Krabappel	111–608	2F05	"Lisa on Ice"
6	Dennis Franz	Himself playing Homer Simpson	112–609	2F06	"Homer Badman"
6	Phil Hartman	Troy McClure	113–610	2F07	"Grampa vs. Sexual Inadequacy"
6	Anne Bancroft	Dr. Zweig	114–611	2F08	"Fear of Flying"
6	Ted Danson	Sam Malone	114–611	2F08	"Fear of Flying"
6	Woody Harrelson	Woody Boyd	114–611	2F08	"Fear of Flying"
6	John Ratzenberger	Cliff Clavin	114–611	2F08	"Fear of Flying"
6	Rhea Perlman	Carla Tortelli	114–611	2F08	"Fear of Flying"
6	George Wendt	Norm Peterson	114–611	2F08	"Fear of Flying"
6	Patrick Stewart	Number One	115–612	2F09	"Homer the Great"
6	Dick Cavett	Himself	118–615	2F12	"Homie the Clown"
6	Joe Mantegna	Fat Tony	118–615	2F12	"Homie the Clown"
6	Johnny Unitas	Himself	118–615	2F12	"Homie the Clown"
6	Phil Hartman	Evan Conover	119–616	2F13	"Bart vs. Australia"
6	Mel Brooks	Himself	120–617	2F14	"Homer vs. Patty and Selma"
6	Susan Sarandon	Ballet teacher	120–617	2F14	"Homer vs. Patty and Selma"
6	Phil Hartman	Charlton Heston	121–618	2F31	"A Star Is Burns"
6	Maurice LaMarche	George C. Scott; Hannibal Lecter; Captain James T. Kirk; Eudora Welty	121–618	2F31	"A Star Is Burns"
6	Jon Lovitz	Jay Sherman	121–618	2F31	"A Star Is Burns"
6	Phil Hartman	Troy McClure	122–619	2F15	"Lisa's Wedding"
6	Mandy Patinkin	Hugh Parkfield	122–619	2F15	"Lisa's Wedding"
6	Frank Welker	Santa's Little Helper; Various dogs	123–620	2F18	"Two Dozen and One Greyhounds"
6	Marcia Wallace	Edna Krabappel	124–621	2F19	"The PTA Disbands"
6	Steve Allen	Himself	125–622	2F32	"'Round Springfield"
6	Phil Hartman	Lionel Hutz	125–622	2F32	"'Round Springfield"
6	Ron Taylor	Bleeding Gums Murphy	125–622	2F32	"'Round Springfield"
6	Marcia Wallace	Edna Krabappel	125–622	2F32	"'Round Springfield"
6	Phil Hartman	Lionel Hutz	126–623	2F21	"The Springfield Connection"
6	Marcia Wallace	Edna Krabappel	126–623	2F21	"The Springfield Connection"
6	Marcia Wallace	Edna Krabappel	127–624	2F22	"Lemon of Troy"
6	Tito Puente	Himself	128–625	2F16	"Who Shot Mr. Burns? Part 1"
7	Tito Puente	Himself	129–701	2F20	"Who Shot Mr. Burns? Part 2"
7	Phil Hartman	Lionel Hutz	130–702	2F17	"Radioactive Man"
7	Mickey Rooney	Himself	130–702	2F17	"Radioactive Man"
7	Joan Kenley	Telephone voice	131–703	3F01	"Home Sweet Homediddly-Dum-Doodily"
7	Marcia Wallace	Edna Krabappel	131–703	3F01	"Home Sweet Homediddly-Dum-Doodily"
7	Frank Welker	Monkey	131–703	3F01	"Home Sweet Homediddly-Dum-Doodily"
7	Phil Hartman	Troy McClure	133–705	3F03	"Lisa the Vegetarian"
7	Linda McCartney	Herself	133–705	3F03	"Lisa the Vegetarian"
7	Paul McCartney	Himself	133–705	3F03	"Lisa the Vegetarian"
7	Paul Anka	Himself	134–706	3F04	"Treehouse of Horror VI"
7	Marcia Wallace	Edna Krabappel	134–706	3F04	"Treehouse of Horror VI"
7	Joan Kenley	Telephone voice	135–707	3F05	"King-Size Homer"
7	Glenn Close	Mona Simpson	136–708	3F06	"Mother Simpson"
7	Harry Morgan	Bill Gannon	136–708	3F06	"Mother Simpson"
7	R. Lee Ermey	Colonel Leslie Hapablap	137–709	3F08	"Sideshow Bob's Last Gleaming"
7	Kelsey Grammer	Sideshow Bob	137–709	3F08	"Sideshow Bob's Last Gleaming"
7	Phil Hartman	Troy McClure; Lionel Hutz	138–710	3F31	"The Simpsons 138th Episode Spectacular"
7	Phil Hartman	Troy McClure	139–711	3F07	"Marge Be Not Proud"
7	Lawrence Tierney	Don Brodka	139–711	3F07	"Marge Be Not Proud"
7	Marcia Wallace	Edna Krabappel	140–712	3F10	"Team Homer"
7	Tom Kite	Himself	142–714	3F11	"Scenes from the Class Struggle in Springfield"
7	Phil Hartman	Troy McClure	143–715	3F12	"Bart the Fink"
7	Bob Newhart	Himself	143–715	3F12	"Bart the Fink"
7	Phil Hartman	Troy McClure	144–716	3F13	"Lisa the Iconoclast"
7	Donald Sutherland	Hollis Hurlbut	144–716	3F13	"Lisa the Iconoclast"
7	Marcia Wallace	Edna Krabappel	144–716	3F13	"Lisa the Iconoclast"
7	Kirk Douglas	Chester J. Lampwick	146–718	3F16	"The Day the Violence Died"
7	Phil Hartman	Lionel Hutz	146–718	3F16	"The Day the Violence Died"
7	Alex Rocco	Roger Meyers Jr.	146–718	3F16	"The Day the Violence Died"
7	Jack Sheldon	Amendment	146–718	3F16	"The Day the Violence Died"
7	Suzanne Somers	Herself	146–718	3F16	"The Day the Violence Died"
7	Jeff Goldblum	MacArthur Parker	147–719	3F15	"A Fish Called Selma"
7	Phil Hartman	Troy McClure; Fat Tony	147–719	3F15	"A Fish Called Selma"
7	Jim Lau	Hong Kong doctor	148–720	3F17	"Bart on the Road"
7	Phil Hartman	Lionel Hutz; Hospital chairman	149–721	3F18	"22 Short Films About Springfield"
7	Marcia Wallace	Edna Krabappel	150–722	3F19	"Raging Abe Simpson and His Grumbling Grandson in 'The Curse of the Flying Hellfish'"
7	Joe Mantegna	Fat Tony	151–723	3F20	"Much Apu About Nothing"
7	Cypress Hill^{[I]}	Themselves	152–724	3F21	"Homerpalooza"
7	Peter Frampton	Himself	152–724	3F21	"Homerpalooza"
7	The Smashing Pumpkins^{[J]}	Themselves	152–724	3F21	"Homerpalooza"
7	Sonic Youth^{[K]}	Themselves	152–724	3F21	"Homerpalooza"
7	Christina Ricci	Erin	153–725	3F22	"Summer of 4 Ft. 2"
7	Marcia Wallace	Edna Krabappel	153–725	3F22	"Summer of 4 Ft. 2"
8	Phil Hartman	Bill Clinton	154–801	4F02	"Treehouse of Horror VII"
8	Albert Brooks	Hank Scorpio	155–802	3F23	"You Only Move Twice"
8	Sally Stevens	Sings "Scorpio"	155–802	3F23	"You Only Move Twice"
8	Michael Buffer	Himself	156–803	4F03	"The Homer They Fall"
8	Sally Stevens	Sings "People"	156–803	4F03	"The Homer They Fall"
8	Paul Winfield	Lucius Sweet	156–803	4F03	"The Homer They Fall"
8	Rodney Dangerfield	Larry Burns	157–804	4F05	"Burns, Baby Burns"
8	Jon Lovitz	Jay Sherman	161–808	4F07	"Hurricane Neddy"
8	Johnny Cash	Coyote	162–809	3F24	"El Viaje Misterioso de Nuestro Jomer (The Mysterious Voyage of Homer)"
8	Gillian Anderson	Dana Scully	163–810	3G01	"The Springfield Files"
8	David Duchovny	Fox Mulder	163–810	3G01	"The Springfield Files"
8	Leonard Nimoy	Himself	163–810	3G01	"The Springfield Files"
8	Joe Mantegna	Fat Tony	164–811	4F08	"The Twisted World of Marge Simpson"
8	Jack Lemmon	Frank Ormand	164–811	4F08	"The Twisted World of Marge Simpson"
8	Marcia Wallace	Edna Krabappel	164–811	4F08	"The Twisted World of Marge Simpson"
8	Phil Hartman	Troy McClure	167–814	4F12	"The Itchy & Scratchy & Poochie Show"
8	Alex Rocco	Roger Meyers Jr.	167–814	4F12	"The Itchy & Scratchy & Poochie Show"
8	John Waters	John	168–815	4F11	"Homer's Phobia"
8	Kelsey Grammer	Sideshow Bob	169–816	4F14	"Brother from Another Series"
8	David Hyde Pierce	Cecil Terwilliger; Man in the crowd	169–816	4F14	"Brother from Another Series"
8	Marcia Wallace	Edna Krabappel	169–816	4F14	"Brother from Another Series"
8	Joe Mantegna	Fat Tony	171–818	4F15	"Homer vs. the Eighteenth Amendment"
8	Dave Thomas	Rex Banner	171–818	4F15	"Homer vs. the Eighteenth Amendment"
8	Michael Dees	Sings "Embraceable You"	172–819	4F09	"Grade School Confidential"
8	Marcia Wallace	Edna Krabappel	172–819	4F09	"Grade School Confidential"
8	Frank Welker	Santa's Little Helper; Laddie	173–820	4F16	"The Canine Mutiny"
8	Bret Hart	Himself	174–821	4F17	"The Old Man and the Lisa"
8	Denice Kumagai	Dancer	175–822	4F18	"In Marge We Trust"
8	Karen Maruyama	Dancer	175–822	4F18	"In Marge We Trust"
8	Sab Shimono	Mr. Sparkle	175–822	4F18	"In Marge We Trust"
8	Gedde Watanabe	Factory foreman	175–822	4F18	"In Marge We Trust"
8	Frank Welker	Baboons	175–822	4F18	"In Marge We Trust"
8	Frank Welker	Executive Vice President dog	176–823	4F19	"Homer's Enemy"
8	Tim Conway	Himself	177–824	4F20	"The Simpsons Spin-Off Showcase"
8	Phil Hartman	Troy McClure	177–824	4F20	"The Simpsons Spin-Off Showcase"
8	Gailard Sartain	Charles "Big" Daddy	177–824	4F20	"The Simpsons Spin-Off Showcase"
8	Willem Dafoe	The Commandant	176–825	4F21	"The Secret War of Lisa Simpson"
8	Marcia Wallace	Edna Krabappel	176–825	4F21	"The Secret War of Lisa Simpson"
9	Michael Dees	Sings "New York, New York"	179–901	4F22	"The City of New York vs. Homer Simpson"
9	Joan Kenley	Telephone voice	179–901	4F22	"The City of New York vs. Homer Simpson"
9	Kipp Lennon	Sings "I'm Checking In"	179–901	4F22	"The City of New York vs. Homer Simpson"
9	Martin Sheen	The real Seymour Skinner	180–902	4F23	"The Principal and the Pauper"
9	Marcia Wallace	Edna Krabappel	180–902	4F23	"The Principal and the Pauper"
9	Fyvush Finkel	Himself playing Krusty	181–903	3G02	"Lisa's Sax"
9	Marcia Wallace	Edna Krabappel	182–904	5F02	"Treehouse of Horror VIII"
9	Roy Firestone	Himself	184–906	5F03	"Bart Star"
9	Mike Judge	Hank Hill	184–906	5F03	"Bart Star"
9	Joe Namath	Himself	184–906	5F03	"Bart Star"
9	Jan Hooks	Manjula Nahasapeemapetilon	185–907	5F04	"The Two Mrs. Nahasapeemapetilons"
9	Andrea Martin	Apu's mother	185–907	5F04	"The Two Mrs. Nahasapeemapetilons"
9	Marcia Wallace	Edna Krabappel	185–907	5F04	"The Two Mrs. Nahasapeemapetilons"
9	Stephen Jay Gould	Himself	186–908	5F05	"Lisa the Skeptic"
9	Phil Hartman	Lionel Hutz	186–908	5F05	"Lisa the Skeptic"
9	Marcia Wallace	Edna Krabappel	186–908	5F05	"Lisa the Skeptic"
9	Phil Hartman	Lionel Hutz	187–909	5F06	"Realty Bites"
9	Alex Trebek	Himself	188–910	5F07	"Miracle on Evergreen Terrace"
9	Marcia Wallace	Edna Krabappel	188–910	5F07	"Miracle on Evergreen Terrace"
9	Jim Varney	Cooder	190–912	5F08	"Bart Carny"
9	Marcia Wallace	Edna Krabappel	191–913	5F23	"The Joy of Sect"
9	Phil Hartman	Troy McClure	192–914	5F11	"Das Bus"
9	James Earl Jones	Narrator	192–914	5F11	"Das Bus"
9	Jack Ong	Fisherman	192–914	5F11	"Das Bus"
9	Bruce Baum	Himself	193–915	5F10	"The Last Temptation of Krust"
9	Janeane Garofalo	Herself	193–915	5F10	"The Last Temptation of Krust"
9	Bobcat Goldthwait	Himself	193–915	5F10	"The Last Temptation of Krust"
9	Jay Leno	Himself	193–915	5F10	"The Last Temptation of Krust"
9	Marcia Wallace	Edna Krabappel	193–915	5F10	"The Last Temptation of Krust"
9	Hank Williams Jr.	Sings "Canyonero!"	193–915	5F10	"The Last Temptation of Krust"
9	Steven Wright	Himself	193–915	5F10	"The Last Temptation of Krust"
9	Helen Hunt	Renee	194–916	5F12	"Dumbbell Indemnity"
9	Marcia Wallace	Edna Krabappel	194–916	5F12	"Dumbbell Indemnity"
9	Phil Hartman	Troy McClure	195–917	4F24	"Lisa the Simpson"
9	Phil Hartman	Troy McClure	196–918	5F13	"This Little Wiggy"
9	Marcia Wallace	Edna Krabappel	196–918	5F13	"This Little Wiggy"
9	Michael Carrington	Drill instructor	197–919	3G04	"Simpson Tide"
9	Bob Denver	Himself	197–919	3G04	"Simpson Tide"
9	Rod Steiger	Captain Tenille	197–919	3G04	"Simpson Tide"
9	Marcia Wallace	Edna Krabappel	198–920	5F14	"The Trouble with Trillions"
9	Paul Winfield	Lucius Sweet	198–920	5F14	"The Trouble with Trillions"
9	Marcia Wallace	Edna Krabappel	199–921	5F15	"Girly Edition"
9	Steve Martin	Ray Patterson	200–922	5F09	"Trash of the Titans"
9	Paul McGuinness	Himself	200–922	5F09	"Trash of the Titans"
9	Susie Smith	Herself	200–922	5F09	"Trash of the Titans"
9	U2^{[L]}	Themselves	200–922	5F09	"Trash of the Titans"
9	Marcia Wallace	Edna Krabappel	200–922	5F09	"Trash of the Titans"
9	Brendan Fraser	Brad	201–923	5F16	"King of the Hill"
9	Steven Weber	Neil	201–923	5F16	"King of the Hill"
9	Marcia Wallace	Edna Krabappel	202–924	5F17	"Lost Our Lisa"
9	Marcia Wallace	Edna Krabappel	203–925	5F18	"Natural Born Kissers"
10	Lisa Kudrow	Alex Whitney	204–1001	5F20	"Lard of the Dance"
10	William Daniels	KITT	205–1002	5F21	"The Wizard of Evergreen Terrace"
10	Phil Hartman	Troy McClure	206–1003	5F22	"Bart the Mother"
10	Marcia Wallace	Edna Krabappel	206–1003	5F22	"Bart the Mother"
10	Robert Englund	Freddy Krueger	207–1004	AABF01	"Treehouse of Horror IX"
10	Kathie Lee Gifford	Herself (live action)	207–1004	AABF01	"Treehouse of Horror IX"
10	Ed McMahon	Himself	207–1004	AABF01	"Treehouse of Horror IX"
10	Regis Philbin	Himself (live action)	207–1004	AABF01	"Treehouse of Horror IX"
10	Jerry Springer	Himself	207–1004	AABF01	"Treehouse of Horror IX"
10	Alec Baldwin	Himself	208–1005	5F19	"When You Dish Upon a Star"
10	Kim Basinger	Herself	208–1005	5F19	"When You Dish Upon a Star"
10	Brian Grazer	Himself	208–1005	5F19	"When You Dish Upon a Star"
10	Ron Howard	Himself	208–1005	5F19	"When You Dish Upon a Star"
10	George Carlin	Munchie	209–1006	AABF02	"D'oh-in' in the Wind"
10	Martin Mull	Seth	209–1006	AABF02	"D'oh-in' in the Wind"
10	Yo La Tengo	Play the end credits	209–1006	AABF02	"D'oh-in' in the Wind"
10	Marcia Wallace	Edna Krabappel	210–1007	AABF03	"Lisa Gets an 'A'"
10	Mark Hamill	Himself; Leavelle; Theater owner	212–1009	AABF05	"Mayored to the Mob"
10	Joe Mantegna	Fat Tony	212–1009	AABF05	"Mayored to the Mob"
10	Dick Tufeld	Robot B-9	212–1009	AABF05	"Mayored to the Mob"
10	Marcia Wallace	Edna Krabappel	212–1009	AABF05	"Mayored to the Mob"
10	The Moody Blues^{[M]}	Themselves	213–1010	AABF06	"Viva Ned Flanders"
10	Marcia Wallace	Edna Krabappel	213–1010	AABF06	"Viva Ned Flanders"
10	Cyndi Lauper	Herself	214–1011	AABF07	"Wild Barts Can't Be Broken"
10	Franklin D. Roosevelt (archival)	Himself	214–1011	AABF07	"Wild Barts Can't Be Broken"
10	Marcia Wallace	Edna Krabappel	214–1011	AABF07	"Wild Barts Can't Be Broken"
10	Troy Aikman	Himself	215–1012	AABF08	"Sunday, Cruddy Sunday"
10	Rosey Grier	Himself	215–1012	AABF08	"Sunday, Cruddy Sunday"
10	John Madden	Himself	215–1012	AABF08	"Sunday, Cruddy Sunday"
10	Dan Marino	Himself	215–1012	AABF08	"Sunday, Cruddy Sunday"
10	Rupert Murdoch	Himself	215–1012	AABF08	"Sunday, Cruddy Sunday"
10	Dolly Parton	Herself	215–1012	AABF08	"Sunday, Cruddy Sunday"
10	Pat Summerall	Himself	215–1012	AABF08	"Sunday, Cruddy Sunday"
10	Fred Willard	Wally Kogen	215–1012	AABF08	"Sunday, Cruddy Sunday"
10	Ed Begley Jr.	Himself	216–1013	AABF09	"Homer to the Max"
10	Jan Hooks	Manjula Nahasapeemapetilon	217–1014	AABF11	"I'm with Cupid"
10	Elton John	Himself	217–1014	AABF11	"I'm with Cupid"
10	Marcia Wallace	Edna Krabappel	217–1014	AABF11	"I'm with Cupid"
10	John Kassir	Possum	218–1015	AABF10	"Marge Simpson in: 'Screaming Yellow Honkers'"
10	Marcia Wallace	Edna Krabappel	218–1015	AABF10	"Marge Simpson in: 'Screaming Yellow Honkers'"
10	Hank Williams Jr.	Sings "Canyonero!"	218–1015	AABF10	"Marge Simpson in: 'Screaming Yellow Honkers'"
10	Marcia Wallace	Mrs. Krabapatra	221–1018	AABF14	"Simpsons Bible Stories"
10	Michael Dees	Sings "Arrivederci Roma"	222–1019	AABF15	"Mom and Pop Art"
10	Jasper Johns	Himself	222–1019	AABF15	"Mom and Pop Art"
10	Isabella Rossellini	Astrid Weller	222–1019	AABF15	"Mom and Pop Art"
10	Marcia Wallace	Edna Krabappel	222–1019	AABF15	"Mom and Pop Art"
10	Jack LaLanne	Himself	223–1020	AABF16	"The Old Man and the 'C' Student"
10	NRBQ	Sing "Can't Buy Me Love"	223–1020	AABF16	"The Old Man and the 'C' Student"
10	Michael McKean	Jerry Rude	224–1021	AABF17	"Monty Can't Buy Me Love"
10	Stephen Hawking	Himself	225–1022	AABF18	"They Saved Lisa's Brain"
10	Denice Kumagai	Mother	226–1023	AABF20	"Thirty Minutes over Tokyo"
10	Karen Maruyama	Stewardess	226–1023	AABF20	"Thirty Minutes over Tokyo"
10	George Takei	Wink	226–1023	AABF20	"Thirty Minutes over Tokyo"
10	Gedde Watanabe	Waiter; Father; Toilet	226–1023	AABF20	"Thirty Minutes over Tokyo"
10	Keone Young	Sumo wrestler	226–1023	AABF20	"Thirty Minutes over Tokyo"
11	Jack Burns	Edward Christian	227–1101	AABF23	"Beyond Blunderdome"
11	Mel Gibson	Himself	227–1101	AABF23	"Beyond Blunderdome"
11	Marcia Wallace	Edna Krabappel	227–1101	AABF23	"Beyond Blunderdome"
11	Mark McGwire	Himself	228–1102	AABF22	"Brother's Little Helper"
11	Marcia Wallace	Edna Krabappel	228–1102	AABF22	"Brother's Little Helper"
11	Edward Asner	Newspaper editor	229–1103	AABF21	"Guess Who's Coming to Criticize Dinner?"
11	Marcia Wallace	Edna Krabappel	229–1103	AABF21	"Guess Who's Coming to Criticize Dinner?"
11	Tom Arnold	Himself	230–1104	BABF01	"Treehouse of Horror X"
11	Dick Clark	Himself	230–1104	BABF01	"Treehouse of Horror X"
11	Lucy Lawless	Herself	230–1104	BABF01	"Treehouse of Horror X"
11	Frank Welker	Werewolf; Werewolf Flanders	230–1104	BABF01	"Treehouse of Horror X"
11	The B-52's	Sing "Glove Slap" (parody of the song Love Shack)	231–1105	AABF19	"E-I-E-I-(Annoyed Grunt)"
11	Marcia Wallace	Edna Krabappel	231–1105	AABF19	"E-I-E-I-(Annoyed Grunt)"
11	Frank Welker	Various animals	231–1105	AABF19	"E-I-E-I-(Annoyed Grunt)"
11	Ron Howard	Himself	232–1106	BABF02	"Hello Gutter, Hello Fadder"
11	Penn Jillette	Himself	232–1106	BABF02	"Hello Gutter, Hello Fadder"
11	Pat O'Brien	Himself	232–1106	BABF02	"Hello Gutter, Hello Fadder"
11	Nancy O'Dell	Herself	232–1106	BABF02	"Hello Gutter, Hello Fadder"
11	Teller	Himself	232–1106	BABF02	"Hello Gutter, Hello Fadder"
11	Marcia Wallace	Edna Krabappel	232–1106	BABF02	"Hello Gutter, Hello Fadder"
11	Jan Hooks	Manjula Nahasapeemapetilon	233–1107	BABF03	"Eight Misbehavin'"
11	Garry Marshall	Larry Kidkill	233–1107	BABF03	"Eight Misbehavin'"
11	Butch Patrick	Himself	233–1107	BABF03	"Eight Misbehavin'"
11	Marcia Wallace	Edna Krabappel	233–1107	BABF03	"Eight Misbehavin'"
11	Frank Welker	Zoo animals	233–1107	BABF03	"Eight Misbehavin'"
11	John Goodman	Meathook	234–1108	BABF05	"Take My Wife, Sleaze"
11	Jan Hooks	Manjula Nahasapeemapetilon	234–1108	BABF05	"Take My Wife, Sleaze"
11	Jay North	Himself	234–1108	BABF05	"Take My Wife, Sleaze"
11	NRBQ	Perform various songs	234–1108	BABF05	"Take My Wife, Sleaze"
11	Marcia Wallace	Edna Krabappel	234–1108	BABF05	"Take My Wife, Sleaze"
11	Henry Winkler	Ramrod	234–1108	BABF05	"Take My Wife, Sleaze"
11	Clarence Clemons	Narrator	235–1109	BABF07	"Grift of the Magi"
11	Gary Coleman	Himself	235–1109	BABF07	"Grift of the Magi"
11	Joe Mantegna	Fat Tony	235–1109	BABF07	"Grift of the Magi"
11	Tim Robbins	Jim Hope	235–1109	BABF07	"Grift of the Magi"
11	Marcia Wallace	Edna Krabappel	235–1109	BABF07	"Grift of the Magi"
11	Elwood Edwards	Virtual doctor	236–1110	BABF04	"Little Big Mom"
11	Marcia Wallace	Edna Krabappel	236–1110	BABF04	"Little Big Mom"
11	Don Cheadle	Brother Faith	237–1111	BABF06	"Faith Off"
11	Joe Mantegna	Fat Tony	237–1111	BABF06	"Faith Off"
11	Marcia Wallace	Edna Krabappel	237–1111	BABF06	"Faith Off"
11	Britney Spears	Herself	238–1112	BABF08	"The Mansion Family"
11	Randy Bachman	Himself	239–1113	BABF09	"Saddlesore Galactica"
11	Jim Cummings	Duncan/Furious D	239–1113	BABF09	"Saddlesore Galactica"
11	Trevor Denman	Track announcer	239–1113	BABF09	"Saddlesore Galactica"
11	Fred Turner	Himself	239–1113	BABF09	"Saddlesore Galactica"
11	Shawn Colvin	Rachel Jordan	240–1114	BABF10	"Alone Again, Natura-Diddily"
11	Marcia Wallace	Edna Krabappel	240–1114	BABF10	"Alone Again, Natura-Diddily"
11	Frank Welker	Parrot	240–1114	BABF10	"Alone Again, Natura-Diddily"
11	Betty White	Herself	241–1115	BABF11	"Missionary: Impossible"
11	Marcia Wallace	Edna Krabappel	242–1116	BABF12	"Pygmoelian"
11	Marcia Wallace	Edna Krabappel	244–1118	BABF14	"Days of Wine and D'oh'ses"
11	Diedrich Bader	Sheriff	245–1119	BABF16	"Kill the Alligator and Run"
11	Joe C.	Himself	245–1119	BABF16	"Kill the Alligator and Run"
11	Robert Evans	Himself	245–1119	BABF16	"Kill the Alligator and Run"
11	Kid Rock	Himself	245–1119	BABF16	"Kill the Alligator and Run"
11	Charlie Rose	Himself	245–1119	BABF16	"Kill the Alligator and Run"
11	Frank Welker	Lion	246–1120	BABF15	"Last Tap Dance in Springfield"
11	Parker Posey	Becky	247–1121	BABF18	"It's a Mad, Mad, Mad, Mad Marge"
11	Marcia Wallace	Edna Krabappel	247–1121	BABF18	"It's a Mad, Mad, Mad, Mad Marge"
11	Marc Wilmore	Dr. Wilmore	247–1121	BABF18	"It's a Mad, Mad, Mad, Mad Marge"
11	Jim Forbes	Narrator	248–1122	BABF19	"Behind the Laughter"
11	Willie Nelson	Himself	248–1122	BABF19	"Behind the Laughter"
11	Marcia Wallace	Edna Krabappel	248–1122	BABF19	"Behind the Laughter"
12	Frank Welker	Dolphins	249–1201	BABF21	"Treehouse of Horror XI"
12	Gary Coleman	Himself	250–1202	BABF20	"A Tale of Two Springfields"
12	Marcia Wallace	Edna Krabappel	250–1202	BABF20	"A Tale of Two Springfields"
12	Frank Welker	Badger; Woodpecker	250–1202	BABF20	"A Tale of Two Springfields"
12	The Who^{[N]}	Themselves	250–1202	BABF20	"A Tale of Two Springfields"
12	Drew Barrymore	Sophie Krustofsky	251–1203	BABF17	"Insane Clown Poppy"
12	Stephen King	Himself	251–1203	BABF17	"Insane Clown Poppy"
12	Joe Mantegna	Fat Tony	251–1203	BABF17	"Insane Clown Poppy"
12	Jay Mohr	Christopher Walken	251–1203	BABF17	"Insane Clown Poppy"
12	Amy Tan	Herself	251–1203	BABF17	"Insane Clown Poppy"
12	John Updike	Himself	251–1203	BABF17	"Insane Clown Poppy"
12	Joshua Jackson	Jesse Grass	252–1204	CABF01	"Lisa the Tree Hugger"
12	Leeza Gibbons	Herself	253–1205	CABF04	"Homer vs. Dignity"
12	Marcia Wallace	Edna Krabappel	253–1205	CABF04	"Homer vs. Dignity"
12	Patrick McGoohan	Number Six	254–1206	CABF02	"The Computer Wore Menace Shoes"
12	Marcia Wallace	Edna Krabappel	254–1206	CABF02	"The Computer Wore Menace Shoes"
12	Edward Norton	Devon Bradley	255–1207	CABF03	"The Great Money Caper"
12	Marcia Wallace	Edna Krabappel	256–1208	CABF06	"Skinner's Sense of Snow"
12	Michael Keaton	Jack Crowley	258–1210	CABF05	"Pokey Mom"
12	Charles Napier	Warden	258–1210	CABF05	"Pokey Mom"
12	Robert Schimmel	Convict	258–1210	CABF05	"Pokey Mom"
12	Bruce Vilanch	Himself	258–1210	CABF05	"Pokey Mom"
12	Marcia Wallace	Edna Krabappel	258–1210	CABF05	"Pokey Mom"
12	Neil Armstrong (archival)	Himself	259–1211	CABF08	"Worst Episode Ever"
12	Johnnie Cochran (archival)	Himself	259–1211	CABF08	"Worst Episode Ever"
12	Richard Nixon (archival)	Himself	259–1211	CABF08	"Worst Episode Ever"
12	Tom Savini	Himself	259–1211	CABF08	"Worst Episode Ever"
12	Andre Agassi	Himself	260–1212	CABF07	"Tennis the Menace"
12	Pete Sampras	Himself	260–1212	CABF07	"Tennis the Menace"
12	Marcia Wallace	Edna Krabappel	260–1212	CABF07	"Tennis the Menace"
12	Serena Williams	Herself	260–1212	CABF07	"Tennis the Menace"
12	Venus Williams	Herself	260–1212	CABF07	"Tennis the Menace"
12	Gary Coleman	Himself	261–1213	CABF10	"Day of the Jackanapes"
12	Kelsey Grammer	Sideshow Bob	261–1213	CABF10	"Day of the Jackanapes"
12	'N Sync^{[O]}	Themselves	262–1214	CABF12	"New Kids on the Blecch"
12	Tony Battaglia	Bart Simpson's singing voice	262–1214	CABF12	"New Kids on the Blecch"
12	Ben Bledsoe	Ralph Wiggum's singing voice	262–1214	CABF12	"New Kids on the Blecch"
12	Michael "J" Horn	Milhouse Van Houten's singing voice	262–1214	CABF12	"New Kids on the Blecch"
12	Marc Terenzi	Nelson Muntz's singing voice	262–1214	CABF12	"New Kids on the Blecch"
12	Stacy Keach	Howard K. Duff VIII	263–1215	CABF09	"Hungry, Hungry Homer"
12	Marcia Wallace	Edna Krabappel	263–1215	CABF09	"Hungry, Hungry Homer"
12	Kathy Griffin	Francine	264–1216	CABF11	"Bye Bye Nerdie"
12	Jan Hooks	Manjula Nahasapeemapetilon	264–1216	CABF11	"Bye Bye Nerdie"
12	Marcia Wallace	Edna Krabappel	264–1216	CABF11	"Bye Bye Nerdie"
12	Frank Welker	Various animals	265–1217	CABF13	"Simpson Safari"
12	Joe Mantegna	Fat Tony	266–1218	CABF14	"Trilogy of Error"
12	Frankie Muniz	Thelonius	266–1218	CABF14	"Trilogy of Error"
12	Shawn Colvin	Rachel Jordan	267–1219	CABF15	"I'm Goin' to Praiseland"
12	Marcia Wallace	Edna Krabappel	267–1219	CABF15	"I'm Goin' to Praiseland"
12	Marcia Wallace	Edna Krabappel	269–1221	CABF17	"Simpsons Tall Tales"
12	Frank Welker	Babe, the Blue Ox; Various animals	269–1221	CABF17	"Simpsons Tall Tales"
13	Pierce Brosnan	Ultrahouse's Pierce Brosnan voice Himself	270–1301	CABF19	"Treehouse of Horror XII"
13	Matthew Perry	Ultrahouse's Matthew Perry voice	270–1301	CABF19	"Treehouse of Horror XII"
13	Marcia Wallace	Edna Krabappel	270–1301	CABF19	"Treehouse of Horror XII"
13	Jess Harnell	Various animals	271–1302	CABF22	"The Parent Rap"
13	Jane Kaczmarek	Judge Constance Harm	271–1302	CABF22	"The Parent Rap"
13	Marcia Wallace	Edna Krabappel	271–1302	CABF22	"The Parent Rap"
13	R.E.M.^{[P]}	Themselves	272–1303	CABF20	"Homer the Moe"
13	Julia Louis-Dreyfus	Gloria	273–1304	CABF18	"A Hunka Hunka Burns in Love"
13	George Takei	Waiter	273–1304	CABF18	"A Hunka Hunka Burns in Love"
13	Joe Mantegna	Fat Tony	274–1305	CABF21	"The Blunder Years"
13	Paul Newman	Himself	274–1305	CABF21	"The Blunder Years"
13	Judith Owen	Herself	274–1305	CABF21	"The Blunder Years"
13	Richard Gere	Himself	275–1306	DABF02	"She of Little Faith"
13	Jane Kaczmarek	Judge Constance Harm	276–1307	DABF01	"Brawl in the Family"
13	Delroy Lindo	Gabriel	276–1307	DABF01	"Brawl in the Family"
13	Ben Stiller	Garth Motherloving	277–1308	DABF03	"Sweets and Sour Marge"
13	Dana Gould	Producer	278–1309	DABF05	"Jaws Wired Shut"
13	John Kassir	Various Animals	278–1309	DABF05	"Jaws Wired Shut"
13	Jon Lovitz	Artie Ziff	279–1310	DABF04	"Half-Decent Proposal"
13	Marcia Wallace	Edna Krabappel	279–1310	DABF04	"Half-Decent Proposal"
13	Wolfgang Puck	Himself	280–1311	DABF06	"The Bart Wants What It Wants"
13	Reese Witherspoon	Greta Wolfcastle	280–1311	DABF06	"The Bart Wants What It Wants"
13	Dennis Weaver	Buck McCoy	281–1312	DABF07	"The Lastest Gun in the West"
13	Frank Welker	Dog	281–1312	DABF07	"The Lastest Gun in the West"
13	Olympia Dukakis	Zelda	282–1313	DABF09	"The Old Man and the Key"
13	Bill Saluga	Ray J. Johnson	282–1313	DABF09	"The Old Man and the Key"
13	Sally Stevens	Sings "Island of Sirens" (parody of the song Copacabana)	283–1314	DABF08	"Tales from the Public Domain"
13	Phish^{[Q]}	Themselves	285–1316	DABF11	"Weekend at Burnsie's"
13	Stan Lee	Himself	287–1318	DABF13	"I Am Furious (Yellow)"
13	Marcia Wallace	Edna Krabappel	287–1318	DABF13	"I Am Furious (Yellow)"
13	James Lipton	Himself	288–1319	DABF14	"The Sweetest Apu"
13	Robert Pinsky	Himself	289–1320	DABF15	"Little Girl in the Big Ten"
13	Carmen Electra	Herself	290–1321	DABF16	"The Frying Game"
13	Frances Sternhagen	Mrs. Bellamy	290–1321	DABF16	"The Frying Game"
13	Joe Mantegna	Fat Tony	291–1322	DABF17	"Poppa's Got a Brand New Badge"
13	Marcia Wallace	Edna Krabappel	291–1322	DABF17	"Poppa's Got a Brand New Badge"
14	Elvis Costello	Himself	293–1402	DABF22	"How I Spent My Strummer Vacation"
14	Mick Jagger	Himself	293–1402	DABF22	"How I Spent My Strummer Vacation"
14	Lenny Kravitz	Himself	293–1402	DABF22	"How I Spent My Strummer Vacation"
14	Tom Petty	Himself	293–1402	DABF22	"How I Spent My Strummer Vacation"
14	Keith Richards	Himself	293–1402	DABF22	"How I Spent My Strummer Vacation"
14	Brian Setzer	Himself	293–1402	DABF22	"How I Spent My Strummer Vacation"
14	Marcia Wallace	Edna Krabappel	293–1402	DABF22	"How I Spent My Strummer Vacation"
14	Tony Bennett	Sings "Capital City"	294–1403	DABF20	"Bart vs. Lisa vs. the Third Grade"
14	Marcia Wallace	Edna Krabappel	294–1403	DABF20	"Bart vs. Lisa vs. the Third Grade"
14	Baha Men^{[R]}	Themselves	295–1404	DABF18	"Large Marge"
14	Jan Hooks	Manjula Nahasapeemapetilon	295–1404	DABF18	"Large Marge"
14	Marcia Wallace	Edna Krabappel	295–1404	DABF18	"Large Marge"
14	Burt Ward	Robin	295–1404	DABF18	"Large Marge"
14	Adam West	Batman	295–1404	DABF18	"Large Marge"
14	Larry Holmes	Himself	296–1405	DABF21	"Helter Shelter"
14	David Lander	Himself	296–1405	DABF21	"Helter Shelter"
14	Kelsey Grammer	Sideshow Bob	297–1406	EABF01	"The Great Louse Detective"
14	Sally Stevens	Sings "The Way We Were"	297–1406	EABF01	"The Great Louse Detective"
14	Little Richard	Himself	298–1407	EABF02	"Special Edna"
14	Marcia Wallace	Edna Krabappel	298–1407	EABF02	"Special Edna"
14	Elliott Gould	Himself	299–1408	EABF03	"The Dad Who Knew Too Little"
14	Pamela Reed	Ruth Powers	300–1409	EABF04	"Strong Arms of the Ma"
14	Ken Burns	Himself	301–1410	EABF06	"Pray Anything"
14	Lisa Leslie	Herself	301–1410	EABF06	"Pray Anything"
14	Blink-182^{[S]}	Themselves	302–1411	EABF05	"Barting Over"
14	Tony Hawk	Himself	302–1411	EABF05	"Barting Over"
14	Jane Kaczmarek	Judge Constance Harm	302–1411	EABF05	"Barting Over"
14	Marcia Wallace	Edna Krabappel	302–1411	EABF05	"Barting Over"
14	George Plimpton	Himself	303–1412	EABF07	"I'm Spelling as Fast as I Can"
14	James L. Brooks	Himself	304–1413	EABF08	"A Star Is Born Again"
14	Helen Fielding	Herself	304–1413	EABF08	"A Star Is Born Again"
14	Gene Merlino	Sings "Jellyfish"	304–1413	EABF08	"A Star Is Born Again"
14	Marisa Tomei	Sara Sloane	304–1413	EABF08	"A Star Is Born Again"
14	Marcia Wallace	Edna Krabappel	304–1413	EABF08	"A Star Is Born Again"
14	Joe Mantegna	Fat Tony	305–1414	EABF09	"Mr. Spritz Goes to Washington"
14	Eric Idle	Declan Desmond	307–1416	EABF11	"'Scuse Me While I Miss the Sky"
14	Joe Mantegna	Fat Tony	307–1416	EABF11	"'Scuse Me While I Miss the Sky"
14	Marcia Wallace	Edna Krabappel	307–1416	EABF11	"'Scuse Me While I Miss the Sky"
14	Terry W. Greene	Large Gay Military Man	308–1417	EABF12	"Three Gays of the Condo"
14	Ben Schatz	Himself	308–1417	EABF12	"Three Gays of the Condo"
14	Scott Thompson	Grady	308–1417	EABF12	"Three Gays of the Condo"
14	"Weird Al" Yankovic	Himself	308–1417	EABF12	"Three Gays of the Condo"
14	David Byrne	Himself	309–1418	EABF13	"Dude, Where's My Ranch?"
14	Andy Serkis	Cleanie	309–1418	EABF13	"Dude, Where's My Ranch?"
14	Jonathan Taylor Thomas	Luke Stetson	309–1418	EABF13	"Dude, Where's My Ranch?"
14	Stacy Keach	Howard K. Duff VII	310–1419	EABF14	"Old Yeller Belly"
14	John Kassir	Various animals	310–1419	EABF14	"Old Yeller Belly"
14	Jackson Browne	Himself	311–1420	EABF15	"Brake My Wife, Please"
14	Steve Buscemi	Himself	311–1420	EABF15	"Brake My Wife, Please"
14	Jane Kaczmarek	Judge Constance Harm	311–1420	EABF15	"Brake My Wife, Please"
14	Marcia Wallace	Edna Krabappel	311–1420	EABF15	"Brake My Wife, Please"
14	Joe Mantegna	Fat Tony	313–1422	EABF17	"Moe Baby Blues"
15	Oscar De La Hoya	Himself	314–1501	EABF21	"Treehouse of Horror XIV"
15	Jennifer Garner	Herself	314–1501	EABF21	"Treehouse of Horror XIV"
15	Dudley R. Herschbach	Himself	314–1501	EABF21	"Treehouse of Horror XIV"
15	Jerry Lewis	Professor John Frink Sr.	314–1501	EABF21	"Treehouse of Horror XIV"
15	Glenn Close	Mona Simpson	315–1502	EABF18	"My Mother the Carjacker"
15	Michael Moore	Himself	316–1503	EABF20	"The President Wore Pearls"
15	Marcia Wallace	Edna Krabappel	316–1503	EABF20	"The President Wore Pearls"
15	Tony Blair	Himself	317–1504	EABF22	"The Regina Monologues"
15	Jane Leeves	Edwina	317–1504	EABF22	"The Regina Monologues"
15	Evan Marriott	Himself	317–1504	EABF22	"The Regina Monologues"
15	Ian McKellen	Himself	317–1504	EABF22	"The Regina Monologues"
15	J. K. Rowling	Herself	317–1504	EABF22	"The Regina Monologues"
15	Charles Napier	Grant Connor	318–1505	EABF19	"The Fat and the Furriest"
15	Jackie Mason	Rabbi Hyman Krustofsky	319–1506	FABF01	"Today I Am A Clown"
15	Mr. T	Himself	319–1506	FABF01	"Today I Am A Clown"
15	Jim Gilstrap	Soulful Prune	320–1507	FABF02	"'Tis the Fifteenth Season"
15	Marcia Wallace	Edna Krabappel	321–1508	FABF03	"Marge vs. Singles, Seniors, Childless Couples and Teens and Gays"
15	Tom Clancy	Himself	323–1510	FABF05	"Diatribe of a Mad Housewife"
15	Ashley Olsen	Herself	323–1510	FABF05	"Diatribe of a Mad Housewife"
15	Mary-Kate Olsen	Herself	323–1510	FABF05	"Diatribe of a Mad Housewife"
15	Thomas Pynchon	Himself	323–1510	FABF05	"Diatribe of a Mad Housewife"
15	Nick Bakay	Salem Saberhagen	325–1512	FABF07	"Milhouse Doesn't Live Here Anymore"
15	William Daniels	KITT	325–1512	FABF07	"Milhouse Doesn't Live Here Anymore"
15	Isabel Sanford	Herself	325–1512	FABF07	"Milhouse Doesn't Live Here Anymore"
15	Dick Tufeld	Robot B-9	325–1512	FABF07	"Milhouse Doesn't Live Here Anymore"
15	Marcia Wallace	Edna Krabappel	325–1512	FABF07	"Milhouse Doesn't Live Here Anymore"
15	Simon Cowell	Henry	326–1513	FABF09	"Smart and Smarter"
15	Jon Lovitz	Artie Ziff; Jay Sherman; Llewelyn Sinclair; Aristotle Amadopolis; Professor Lombardo	327–1514	FABF08	"The Ziff Who Came to Dinner"
15	Brave Combo	Play the end credits	328–1515	FABF10	"Co-Dependent's Day"
15	Marcia Wallace	Edna Krabappel	328–1515	FABF10	"Co-Dependent's Day"
15	Sarah Michelle Gellar	Gina Vendetti	329–1516	FABF11	"The Wandering Juvie"
15	Jane Kaczmarek	Judge Constance Harm	329–1516	FABF11	"The Wandering Juvie"
15	Charles Napier	Warden	329–1516	FABF11	"The Wandering Juvie"
15	Marcia Wallace	Edna Krabappel	329–1516	FABF11	"The Wandering Juvie"
15	Matt Groening	Himself	330–1517	FABF12	"My Big Fat Geek Wedding"
15	Marcia Wallace	Edna Krabappel	330–1517	FABF12	"My Big Fat Geek Wedding"
15	Mark Campbell	Country singer	332–1519	FABF15	"Simple Simpson"
15	Nichelle Nichols	Herself	332–1519	FABF15	"Simple Simpson"
15	Marcia Wallace	Edna Krabappel	334–1521	FABF17	"The Bart-Mangled Banner"
16	Marie Cain	Sings "I've Got You Under My Skin"	336–1601	FABF23	"Treehouse of Horror XV"
16	James Caan	Himself	337–1602	FABF20	"All's Fair in Oven War"
16	Thomas Pynchon	Himself	337–1602	FABF20	"All's Fair in Oven War"
16	Marcia Wallace	Edna Krabappel	337–1602	FABF20	"All's Fair in Oven War"
16	Marcia Wallace	Edna Krabappel	338–1603	FABF19	"Sleeping with the Enemy"
16	Kim Cattrall	Chloe Talbot	339–1604	FABF22	"She Used to Be My Girl"
16	Michael Dees	Sings "Too-Ra-Loo-Ra-Loo-Ral (That's an Irish Lullaby)"	339–1604	FABF22	"She Used to Be My Girl"
16	Terry W. Greene	Sgt. Activity	340–1605	FABF21	"Fat Man and Little Boy"
16	Eric Idle	Declan Desmond	340–1605	FABF21	"Fat Man and Little Boy"
16	Tom Brady	Himself	343–1608	GABF02	"Homer and Ned's Hail Mary Pass"
16	LeBron James	Himself	343–1608	GABF02	"Homer and Ned's Hail Mary Pass"
16	Michelle Kwan	Herself	343–1608	GABF02	"Homer and Ned's Hail Mary Pass"
16	Warren Sapp	Himself	343–1608	GABF02	"Homer and Ned's Hail Mary Pass"
16	Yao Ming	Himself	343–1608	GABF02	"Homer and Ned's Hail Mary Pass"
16	50 Cent	Himself	344–1609	GABF03	"Pranksta Rap"
16	Dana Gould	Barney Fife	344–1609	GABF03	"Pranksta Rap"
16	Marcia Wallace	Edna Krabappel	345–1610	GABF04	"There's Something About Marrying"
16	Gary Busey	Himself	346–1611	GABF05	"On a Clear Day I Can't See My Sister"
16	Jane Kaczmarek	Judge Constance Harm	346–1611	GABF05	"On a Clear Day I Can't See My Sister"
16	Marcia Wallace	Edna Krabappel	346–1611	GABF05	"On a Clear Day I Can't See My Sister"
16	Lucy Liu	Madam Wu	347–1612	GABF06	"Goo Goo Gai Pan"
16	Robert Wagner	Himself	347–1612	GABF06	"Goo Goo Gai Pan"
16	Frank Gehry	Himself	349–1614	GABF08	"The Seven-Beer Snitch"
16	Joe Mantegna	Fat Tony	349–1614	GABF08	"The Seven-Beer Snitch"
16	Charles Napier	Officer Krackney	349–1614	GABF08	"The Seven-Beer Snitch"
16	John DiMaggio	Bender	350–1615	GABF12	"Future-Drama"
16	Amy Poehler	Jenda	350–1615	GABF12	"Future-Drama"
16	Marcia Wallace	Edna Krabappel	350–1615	GABF12	"Future-Drama"
16	Stephen Hawking	Himself	351–1616	GABF10	"Don't Fear the Roofer"
16	Ray Romano	Ray Magini	351–1616	GABF10	"Don't Fear the Roofer"
16	Albert Brooks	Tab Spangler; Jacques	352–1617	GABF11	"The Heartbroke Kid"
16	Marcia Wallace	Edna Krabappel	352–1617	GABF11	"The Heartbroke Kid"
16	Fantasia Barrino	Clarissa Wellington	353–1618	GABF13	"A Star Is Torn"
16	Baha Men	Sing "Who Wants a Haircut?" (parody of the song Who Let the Dogs Out?)	354–1619	GABF14	"Thank God, It's Doomsday"
16	Los Lobos	Play the end credits	354–1619	GABF14	"Thank God, It's Doomsday"
16	Jason Bateman	Himself	355–1620	GABF15	"Home Away from Homer"
16	Liam Neeson	Father Sean	356–1621	GABF09	"The Father, the Son, and the Holy Guest Star"
16	Marcia Wallace	Edna Krabappel	356–1621	GABF09	"The Father, the Son, and the Holy Guest Star"
17	Alec Baldwin	Caleb Thorn	357–1701	GABF18	"Bonfire of the Manatees"
17	Joe Mantegna	Fat Tony	357–1701	GABF18	"Bonfire of the Manatees"
17	Terry Bradshaw	Himself	360–1704	GABF17	"Treehouse of Horror XVI"
17	Terry W. Greene	Lava-tron	360–1704	GABF17	"Treehouse of Horror XVI"
17	Dennis Rodman	Himself	360–1704	GABF17	"Treehouse of Horror XVI"
17	Lily Tomlin	Tammy	363–1707	GABF22	"The Last of the Red Hat Mamas"
17	Maria Grazia Cucinotta	Francesca Terwilliger	364–1708	HABF02	"The Italian Bob"
17	Kelsey Grammer	Sideshow Bob	364–1708	HABF02	"The Italian Bob"
17	Marcia Wallace	Edna Krabappel	364–1708	HABF02	"The Italian Bob"
17	Joe Frazier	Himself	366–1710	HABF03	"Homer's Paternity Coot"
17	William H. Macy	Himself	366–1710	HABF03	"Homer's Paternity Coot"
17	Michael York	Mason Fairbanks	366–1710	HABF03	"Homer's Paternity Coot"
17	Marcia Wallace	Edna Krabappel	367–1711	HABF04	"We're on the Road to D'ohwhere"
17	Marcia Wallace	Edna Krabappel	368–1712	HABF05	"My Fair Laddy"
17	Michael Dees	Sings "Fly Me to the Moon"	369–1713	HABF06	"The Seemingly Never-Ending Story"
17	Maurice LaMarche	Commander McBragg	369–1713	HABF06	"The Seemingly Never-Ending Story"
17	Marcia Wallace	Edna Krabappel	369–1713	HABF06	"The Seemingly Never-Ending Story"
17	Antonio Fargas	Huggy Bear	370–1714	HABF07	"Bart Has Two Mommies"
17	Randy Johnson	Himself	370–1714	HABF07	"Bart Has Two Mommies"
17	Susan Sarandon	Herself	370–1714	HABF07	"Bart Has Two Mommies"
17	Dave Thomas	Bob Hope	370–1714	HABF07	"Bart Has Two Mommies"
17	Ricky Gervais	Charles Heathbar	371–1715	HABF08	"Homer Simpson, This Is Your Wife"
17	Marcia Wallace	Edna Krabappel	371–1715	HABF08	"Homer Simpson, This Is Your Wife"
17	Michael Carrington	Sports anchor #2	372–1716	HABF09	"Million Dollar Abie"
17	Rob Reiner	Himself	372–1716	HABF09	"Million Dollar Abie"
17	Richard Dean Anderson	Himself	373–1717	HABF10	"Kiss Kiss, Bang Bangalore"
17	Meher Tatna	Indian passenger	373–1717	HABF10	"Kiss Kiss, Bang Bangalore"
17	Amick Byram	Singing Itchy	375–1719	HABF12	"Girls Just Want to Have Sums"
17	Jim Gilstrap	Wise Old Cat singer	375–1719	HABF12	"Girls Just Want to Have Sums"
17	Bob Joyce	Singing Scratchy	375–1719	HABF12	"Girls Just Want to Have Sums"
17	Frances McDormand	Melanie Upfoot	375–1719	HABF12	"Girls Just Want to Have Sums"
17	Sally Stevens	Singing Female Cat	375–1719	HABF12	"Girls Just Want to Have Sums"
17	Marcia Wallace	Edna Krabappel	375–1719	HABF12	"Girls Just Want to Have Sums"
17	Oren Waters	Singing Male Cat	375–1719	HABF12	"Girls Just Want to Have Sums"
17	Sal Bando	Himself	376–1720	HABF13	"Regarding Margie"
17	Gene Tenace	Himself	376–1720	HABF13	"Regarding Margie"
17	Marcia Wallace	Edna Krabappel	376–1720	HABF13	"Regarding Margie"
17	Melanie Griffith	Herself	377–1721	HABF14	"The Monkey Suit"
17	Larry Hagman	Wallace Brady	377–1721	HABF14	"The Monkey Suit"
17	Stacy Keach	Howard K. Duff VII	378–1722	HABF16	"Marge and Homer Turn a Couple Play"
17	Mandy Moore	Tabitha Vixx	378–1722	HABF16	"Marge and Homer Turn a Couple Play"
18	Michael Imperioli	Dante Calabresis Jr.	379–1801	HABF15	"The Mook, the Chef, the Wife and Her Homer"
18	Joe Mantegna	Fat Tony	379–1801	HABF15	"The Mook, the Chef, the Wife and Her Homer"
18	Metallica^{[T]}	Themselves	379–1801	HABF15	"The Mook, the Chef, the Wife and Her Homer"
18	Joe Pantoliano	Dante Calabresis	379–1801	HABF15	"The Mook, the Chef, the Wife and Her Homer"
18	Larina Jean Adamson	Waitress	380–1802	HABF18	"Jazzy and the Pussycats"
18	The White Stripes^{[U]}	Themselves	380–1802	HABF18	"Jazzy and the Pussycats"
18	Fran Drescher	Female Golem	382–1804	HABF17	"Treehouse of Horror XVII"
18	Maurice LaMarche	Orson Welles	382–1804	HABF17	"Treehouse of Horror XVII"
18	Richard Lewis	Male Golem	382–1804	HABF17	"Treehouse of Horror XVII"
18	Phil McGraw	Himself	382–1804	HABF17	"Treehouse of Horror XVII"
18	Sir Mix-a-Lot	Sings "Baby Likes Fat" (parody of the song Baby Got Back)	382–1804	HABF17	"Treehouse of Horror XVII"
18	Marcia Wallace	Edna Krabappel	382–1804	HABF17	"Treehouse of Horror XVII"
18	Maurice LaMarche	Recruiter #2; Cap'n Crunch	383–1805	HABF21	"G.I. (Annoyed Grunt)"
18	Kiefer Sutherland	Colonel	383–1805	HABF21	"G.I. (Annoyed Grunt)"
18	Michael Chabon	Himself	384–1806	HABF19	"Moe'N'a Lisa"
18	Jonathan Franzen	Himself	384–1806	HABF19	"Moe'N'a Lisa"
18	J. K. Simmons	J. Jonah Jameson	384–1806	HABF19	"Moe'N'a Lisa"
18	Gore Vidal	Himself	384–1806	HABF19	"Moe'N'a Lisa"
18	Tom Wolfe	Himself	384–1806	HABF19	"Moe'N'a Lisa"
18	Elvis Stojko	Himself	387–1809	JABF01	"Kill Gil, Volumes I & II"
18	Dana Gould	Rotting Pelican Crewman	388–1810	JABF03	"The Wife Aquatic"
18	Maurice LaMarche	First Mate Billy; Oceanographer	388–1810	JABF03	"The Wife Aquatic"
18	Sab Shimono	Japanese fisherman	388–1810	JABF03	"The Wife Aquatic"
18	Natalie Portman	Darcy	390–1812	JABF04	"Little Big Girl"
18	Eric Idle	Declan Desmond	391–1813	JABF07	"Springfield Up"
18	Peter Bogdanovich	Psychologist	392–1814	JABF09	"Yokel Chords"
18	Andy Dick	Himself	392–1814	JABF09	"Yokel Chords"
18	James Patterson	Himself	392–1814	JABF09	"Yokel Chords"
18	Meg Ryan	Dr. Stacey Swanson	392–1814	JABF09	"Yokel Chords"
18	Stephen Sondheim	Himself	392–1814	JABF09	"Yokel Chords"
18	Marcia Wallace	Edna Krabappel	392–1814	JABF09	"Yokel Chords"
18	Jane Kaczmarek	Judge Constance Harm	393–1815	JABF08	"Rome-old and Juli-eh"
18	Jon Lovitz	Enrico Irritazio	394–1816	JABF06	"Homerazzi"
18	J. K. Simmons	Tabloid editor	394–1816	JABF06	"Homerazzi"
18	Betty White	Herself	394–1816	JABF06	"Homerazzi"
18	Ronaldo	Himself	395–1817	JABF10	"Marge Gamer"
18	Marcia Wallace	Edna Krabappel	395–1817	JABF10	"Marge Gamer"
18	Rudy Giuliani^{[V]}	Himself	398–1818	JABF12	"Stop or My Dog Will Shoot"
18	Stephen Hawking	Himself	398–1818	JABF12	"Stop or My Dog Will Shoot"
18	Maurice LaMarche	Farmer; Horn Stuffer	398–1818	JABF12	"Stop or My Dog Will Shoot"
18	Marcia Wallace	Edna Krabappel	398–1818	JABF12	"Stop or My Dog Will Shoot"
18	Mary Lynn Rajskub	Chloe O'Brian	399–1821	JABF14	"24 Minutes"
18	Kiefer Sutherland	Jack Bauer	399–1821	JABF14	"24 Minutes"
18	Maurice LaMarche	Fox announcer	400–1822	JABF15	"You Kent Always Say What You Want"
18	Ludacris	Himself	400–1822	JABF15	"You Kent Always Say What You Want"
Movie	Albert Brooks	Russ Cargill	M1	—	The Simpsons Movie
Movie	Green Day^{[W]}	Themselves	M1	—	The Simpsons Movie
Movie	Tom Hanks	Himself	M1	—	The Simpsons Movie
Movie	Joe Mantegna	Fat Tony	M1	—	The Simpsons Movie
Movie	Phil Rosenthal	TV Dad	M1	—	The Simpsons Movie
Movie	Marcia Wallace	Edna Krabappel	M1	—	The Simpsons Movie
19	Stephen Colbert	Colby Kraus	401–1901	JABF20	"He Loves to Fly and He D'ohs"
19	Lionel Richie	Himself	401–1901	JABF20	"He Loves to Fly and He D'ohs"
19	Plácido Domingo	Himself	402–1902	JABF18	"Homer of Seville"
19	Maya Rudolph	Julia	402–1902	JABF18	"Homer of Seville"
19	Matt Dillon	Louie	403–1903	JABF21	"Midnight Towboy"
19	Steve Buscemi	Dwight David Diddlehoffer	404–1904	JABF19	"I Don't Wanna Know Why the Caged Bird Sings"
19	Julia Louis-Dreyfus	Gloria	404–1904	JABF19	"I Don't Wanna Know Why the Caged Bird Sings"
19	Ted Nugent	Himself	404–1904	JABF19	"I Don't Wanna Know Why the Caged Bird Sings"
19	Maurice LaMarche	Government Official	405–1905	JABF16	"Treehouse of Horror XVIII"
19	Jack Black	Milo	407–1907	JABF17	"Husbands and Knives"
19	Daniel Clowes	Himself	407–1907	JABF17	"Husbands and Knives"
19	Maurice LaMarche	Jock	407–1907	JABF17	"Husbands and Knives"
19	Sang Am Lee	Korean singer	407–1907	JABF17	"Husbands and Knives"
19	Alan Moore	Himself	407–1907	JABF17	"Husbands and Knives"
19	Art Spiegelman	Himself	407–1907	JABF17	"Husbands and Knives"
19	Kelsey Grammer	Sideshow Bob	408–1908	KABF01	"Funeral for a Fiend"
19	John Mahoney	Dr. Robert Terwilliger Sr.	408–1908	KABF01	"Funeral for a Fiend"
19	Keith Olbermann	Himself	408–1908	KABF01	"Funeral for a Fiend"
19	David Hyde Pierce	Cecil Terwilliger	408–1908	KABF01	"Funeral for a Fiend"
19	Dan Rather	Himself	410–1910	KABF03	"E Pluribus Wiggum"
19	Jon Stewart	Himself	410–1910	KABF03	"E Pluribus Wiggum"
19	Michael Dees	Sings "Winter Wonderland"	411–1911	KABF04	"That '90s Show"
19	Kurt Loder	Himself	411–1911	KABF04	"That '90s Show"
19	"Weird Al" Yankovic	Himself	411–1911	KABF04	"That 90's Show"
19	Topher Grace	Donny	413–1913	KABF06	"The Debarted"
19	Terry Gross	Herself	413–1913	KABF06	"The Debarted"
19	Marcia Wallace	Edna Krabappel	413–1913	KABF06	"The Debarted"
19	Marcia Wallace	Edna Krabappel	414–1914	KABF07	"Dial 'N' for Nerder"
19	Beverly D'Angelo	Lurleen Lumpkin	416–1916	KABF09	"Papa Don't Leech"
19	Dixie Chicks^{[X]}	Themselves	416–1916	KABF09	"Papa Don't Leech"
19	Zooey Deschanel	Mary Spuckler	417–1917	KABF10	"Apocalypse Cow"
19	Jim Jarmusch	Himself	418–1918	KABF11	"Any Given Sundance"
19	John C. Reilly	Himself	418–1918	KABF11	"Any Given Sundance"
19	Lance Armstrong	Himself	419–1919	KABF12	"Mona Leaves-a"
19	Glenn Close	Mona Simpson	419–1919	KABF12	"Mona Leaves-a"
19	Drew Carey	Himself	420–1920	KABF13	"All About Lisa"
20	Robert Forster	Lucky Jim	421–2001	KABF17	"Sex, Pies and Idiot Scrapes"
20	Julia Louis-Dreyfus	Gloria	421–2001	KABF17	"Sex, Pies and Idiot Scrapes"
20	Joe Mantegna	Fat Tony	421–2001	KABF17	"Sex, Pies and Idiot Scrapes"
20	Brian Grazer	Himself	422–2002	KABF15	"Lost Verizon"
20	Denis Leary	Himself	422–2002	KABF15	"Lost Verizon"
20	Joe Montana	Himself	423–2003	KABF14	"Double, Double, Boy in Trouble"
20	Marcia Wallace	Edna Krabappel	424–2004	KABF16	"Treehouse of Horror XIX"
20	Maurice LaMarche	Toucan Sam; Cap'n Crunch; Trix Rabbit	425–2005	KABF18	"Dangerous Curves"
20	Merl Reagle	Himself	426–2006	KABF19	"Homer and Lisa Exchange Cross Words"
20	Will Shortz	Himself	426–2006	KABF19	"Homer and Lisa Exchange Cross Words"
20	Scott Thompson	Grady	426–2006	KABF19	"Homer and Lisa Exchange Cross Words"
20	Marcia Wallace	Edna Krabappel	426–2006	KABF19	"Homer and Lisa Exchange Cross Words"
20	Shohreh Aghdashloo	Mina bin Laden	427–2007	KABF20	"Mypods and Boomsticks"
20	Marv Albert	Himself	428–2008	KABF21	"The Burns and the Bees"
20	Jeff Bezos	Himself	428–2008	KABF21	"The Burns and the Bees"
20	Mark Cuban	Himself	428–2008	KABF21	"The Burns and the Bees"
20	Emily Blunt	Juliet Hobbes	429–2009	KABF22	"Lisa the Drama Queen"
20	Fall Out Boy	Play the end credits	429–2009	KABF22	"Lisa the Drama Queen"
20	Marcia Wallace	Edna Krabappel	430–2010	LABF01	"Take My Life, Please"
20	Marcia Wallace	Edna Krabappel	431–2011	LABF02	"How the Test Was Won"
20	Maurice LaMarche	Dwight D. Eisenhower	432–2012	LABF03	"No Loan Again, Naturally"
20	Marcia Wallace	Edna Krabappel	432–2012	LABF03	"No Loan Again, Naturally"
20	Ed Begley Jr.	Himself	433–2013	LABF04	"Gone Maggie Gone"
20	Glen Hansard	Street musician	434–2014	LABF11	"In the Name of the Grandfather"
20	Markéta Irglová	Czech singer	434–2014	LABF11	"In the Name of the Grandfather"
20	Colm Meaney	Tom O'Flanagan	434–2014	LABF11	"In the Name of the Grandfather"
20	Marcia Wallace	Edna Krabappel	434–2014	LABF11	"In the Name of the Grandfather"
20	Kelsey Grammer	Sideshow Bob	435–2015	LABF05	"Wedding for Disaster"
20	Anne Hathaway	Jenny	437–2017	LABF07	"The Good, the Sad and the Drugly"
20	Canvas^{[Y]}	Perform the end credits	438–2018	LABF08	"Father Knows Worst"
20	Marcia Wallace	Edna Krabappel	438–2018	LABF08	"Father Knows Worst"
20	Maurice LaMarche	City Inspector	439–2019	LABF10	"Waverly Hills 9-0-2-1-D'oh"
20	Elliot Page^{[Z]}	Alaska Nebraska	439–2019	LABF10	"Waverly Hills 9-0-2-1-D'oh"
20	Marcia Wallace	Edna Krabappel	439–2019	LABF10	"Waverly Hills 9-0-2-1-D'oh"
20	Jodie Foster	Maggie Simpson	440–2020	LABF09	"Four Great Women and a Manicure"

== Notes ==
- A. This figure counts the members of bands with speaking roles separately. Bands who merely perform a song are counted as one because there is no confirmation of which of the band's members performed on their appearance.
- B. Brooks was credited as "A. Brooks" for all of his appearances.
- C. Hoffman was credited as "Sam Etic".
- D. Jackson was credited as "John Jay Smith".
- E. Consisting of Steven Tyler, Joe Perry, Brad Whitford, Tom Hamilton and Joey Kramer.
- F. Consisting of Anthony Kiedis, Flea, Arik Marshall and Chad Smith.
- G. Consisting of James Campbell, George Economou, Shelby Grimm and Dan Jordan.
- H. Consisting of Joey Ramone, Johnny Ramone, C. J. Ramone and Marky Ramone.
- I. Consisting of Sen Dog, B-Real and DJ Muggs.
- J. Consisting of Billy Corgan, Jimmy Chamberlin, James Iha and D'arcy Wretzky.
- K. Consisting of Thurston Moore, Lee Ranaldo, Kim Gordon and Steve Shelley.
- L. Consisting of Bono, The Edge and Adam Clayton. Larry Mullen Jr. appears in animated form but does not have any lines.
- M. Consisting of Ray Thomas, Graeme Edge, Justin Hayward and John Lodge.
- N. Consisting of Roger Daltrey, John Entwistle and Paul Townshend, who voiced his brother Pete Townshend.
- O. Consisting of Lance Bass, JC Chasez, Joey Fatone, Chris Kirkpatrick and Justin Timberlake.
- P. Consisting of Peter Buck, Mike Mills and Michael Stipe.
- Q. Consisting of Trey Anastasio, Mike Gordon, Jon Fishman and Page McConnell.
- R. Consisting of Patrick Cary, Omerit Hield and Marvin Prosper.
- S. Consisting of Mark Hoppus, Tom DeLonge and Travis Barker.
- T. Consisting of James Hetfield, Kirk Hammett, Lars Ulrich and Robert Trujillo.
- U. Consisting of Jack White and Meg White.
- V. Giuliani's appearance was cut from the original American broadcast because he became a candidate in the 2008 United States presidential election.
- W. Consisting of Billie Joe Armstrong, Mike Dirnt and Tre Cool.
- X. Consisting of Natalie Maines, Martie Maguire and Emily Robison.
- Y. Consisting of Lisa Eve Knight, Jennifer Sharon, Karis Pratt, Jocelyn Markey, Dave Doody, Cason Swindle, Karl Hillstrom and James Bacher.
- Z. Page was credited as "Ellen Page"
