= Stop, or My Dog Will Shoot! =

- The Simpsons episode
- The episode's promotional image, featuring Rudy Giuliani.
- Episode no.: Season 18; Episode 20
- Directed by: Matthew Faughnan
- Written by: John Frink
- Production code: JABF12
- Original air date: May 13, 2007

Guest appearances
- Stephen Hawking as himself; Rudy Giuliani as himself; Maurice LaMarche as The Horn Stuffer; Marcia Wallace as Edna Krabappel

Episode features
- Chalkboard gag: "Pearls are not oyster barf"
- Couch gag: The Simpson family sits down on the couch. Then, another Simpson family sits down on it. Then, many more Simpson families come into the house at once. One Homer shouts "Hey, don't shove!"
- Commentary: Al Jean; John Frink; Matt Selman; Tom Gammill; Max Pross; David Silverman; Nancy Cartwright; Raymond Persi

Episode chronology
← Previous "Crook and Ladder"	Next → "24 Minutes"
- The Simpsons season 18

"Stop, or My Dog Will Shoot!" is the twentieth episode of the eighteenth season of the American animated television series The Simpsons. It first aired on the Fox network in the United States on May 13, 2007. The episode was written by John Frink and directed by Matthew Faughnan.

When Santa's Little Helper rescues a lost Homer, he becomes a local hero and the Simpsons decide to enroll him in Police Dog Academy, where he is teamed with Lou and they become a crime-busting duo. Bart's excitement quickly vanishes after an incident with a jaded Santa's Little Helper, so to appease Bart's depression after the loss of his dog, Marge agrees to buy him a huge pet snake, which causes a life-threatening situation at Bart and Lisa's school.

Physicist Stephen Hawking makes his third guest appearance on the show as himself, while Maurice LaMarche does the voice of the Horn Stuffer. Rudy Giuliani makes a guest voice appearance as himself, although not in the original airing. The episode was nominated for a Writers Guild of America Award.

== Plot ==
Homer, excited about going to Oktoberfest, is disappointed when he discovers that Marge has tricked him and the kids into going to a Harvest Festival which allows no alcohol. While attempting to leave, Homer accidentally leads the family into a cornfield maze. Lisa crafts an escape plan with Tremaux's algorithm, a real life maze-solving method, but Homer is left behind after wrongly assuming that Marge wants to break up when she was suggesting to split up to find a way out.

Homer is lost inside the maze for several hours and Santa's Little Helper is called upon by Bart to find him. The dog manages to sniff out Homer and drag him out of the maze. Santa's Little Helper becomes a hero and the Simpsons, persuaded by Chief Wiggum, enroll him in the Springfield Animal Police Academy, where he is teamed with Lou, managing to help fight crime in Springfield.

Santa's Little Helper catches Snake Jailbird who is taken to court, but freed on a technicality. This makes Santa's Little Helper jaded, and when he returns home, he bites Bart on the leg out of frustration. Considering the fact that the pressure from the fight against crime is what led to the dog's actions on Bart, the Simpsons send the dog away to live with Lou. As a replacement, Marge buys Bart an African rock python, which he names Strangles. Bart takes Strangles to show and tell at school, where Strangles escapes into a school lab and unintentionally knocks over beakers of ethanol and nitric acid, mixing both substances and creating a toxic cloud.

Bart, being the only person still stranded in school trying to find Strangles, collapses from the smoke, (remarking "It smells like some chemicals cut one"). Both Santa's Little Helper and Strangles arrive to save Bart, who chooses his faithful dog to save him. Santa's Little Helper goes back to living with the Simpsons. Groundskeeper Willie adopts Strangles, and places him in the fire hose coil.

== Production ==
Physicist Stephen Hawking reprised his role as himself. Hawking had appeared in several episodes of the series starting with the tenth season episode "They Saved Lisa's Brain".

Politician Rudy Giuliani was reported to be appearing in an episode of the series in November 2006. Giuliani was announced in the official press release as appearing in this episode. As a result, a promotional image of him in Simpsonized form was released. However, his appearance was not included in the final version of the episode. According to executive producer James L. Brooks in an interview with Charlie Rose, the show was not allowed to use Giuliani's appearance because he had become a presidential candidate even though the producers offered to give invitations to all candidates.

However, Giuliani's appearance is present in the syndicated version of the episode where he gives the commencement address at the police animal academy graduation ceremony.

== Cultural references ==
In Bart's vision, Santa's Little Helper becomes a dog version of RoboCop, Jason Voorhees from the Friday the 13th media franchise, and Pinhead from the Hellraiser media franchise. Clippy, the Microsoft Word icon appears on the computer at school. When Strangles tries to eat it, it says, "You look like you're trying to eat me. Need some help?".

== Release ==
The episode was originally scheduled to air on April 29, 2007. However, the episode was rescheduled for May 13, 2007. Instead, The Episode "The Boys Of Bummer" Was Aired Due To The Episode Featuring Guns And A School Evacuation Scene

== Reception ==
=== Viewing figures ===
The episode earned a 2.3 rating and was watched by 6.54 million viewers, which was the 55th most watch show that week.

=== Critical response ===
Robert Canning of IGN describes the episode as "average", and was only a buildup to next week's 400th episode. Canning says the episode had bright bits, including Stephen Hawking's appearance.

Adam Finley of TV Squad states the episode "fell flat halfway through the middle act, and all of the third".

On Four Finger Discount, Guy Davis and Brendan Dando thought the episode did not have "a lot happening" and thought the opening segment was boring.

=== Awards and nominations ===
This episode was nominated for the Writers Guild of America Award for Television: Animation at the 60th Writers Guild of America Awards, but lost to "Kill Gil, Volumes I & II", another episode from this season.
