= The Simpsons season 18 =

Season of television series

The Simpsons
- Season 18
- DVD cover featuring Fat Tony
- Showrunner: Al Jean
- No. of episodes: 22

Release
- Original network: Fox
- Original release: September 10, 2006 – May 20, 2007

Season chronology
- ← Previous; Season 17 Next → Season 19

The eighteenth season of the American animated sitcom The Simpsons aired on Fox between September 10, 2006, and May 20, 2007. The season contained seven hold-over episodes from the seventeenth season’s HABF production line. Al Jean served as the showrunner, a position he has held since the thirteenth season, while the season was produced by Gracie Films and 20th Century Fox Television.

The season finale, "You Kent Always Say What You Want", was the series' 400th episode. Additionally, the Simpsons franchise celebrated its 20th anniversary, as it has been on the air since April 19, 1987, beginning with shorts on The Tracey Ullman Show.

== Voice cast & characters ==
=== Main cast ===
- Dan Castellaneta as Homer Simpson, Hans Moleman, Groundskeeper Willie, Louie, Squeaky-Voiced Teen, Krusty the Clown, Sideshow Mel, Gil Gunderson, Snowball II, Rabbi Krustofsky, Grampa Simpson, Barney Gumble, Mayor Quimby, Kodos, Santa's Little Helper, Rich Texan, The Leprechaun, Mr. Teeny, Bill, Arnie Pye, Count Dracula, various others
- Julie Kavner as Marge Simpson, Patty Bouvier, and Selma Bouvier
- Nancy Cartwright as Bart Simpson, Kearney Zzyzwicz, Nelson Muntz, Ralph Wiggum, Database, Todd Flanders, various others
- Yeardley Smith as Lisa Simpson
- Hank Azaria as Johnny Tightlips, Moe Szyslak, Carl Carlson, Sea Captain, Cletus Spuckler, Professor Frink, Chief Wiggum, Wiseguy, Superintendent Chalmers, Comic Book Guy, Disco Stu, Officer Lou, Snake, Kirk Van Houten, Apu Nahasapeemapetilon, The Grumple, Mr. Costington, Old Jewish Man, Gabbo, Drederick Tatum, Dr. Nick Riviera, Luigi Risotto, various others
- Harry Shearer as Otto Mann, Principal Skinner, Dewey Largo, Dr. Hibbert, Ned Flanders, Lenny Leonard, Reverend Lovejoy, Kent Brockman, Mr. Burns, Waylon Smithers, Kang, Rainier Wolfcastle, Judge Snyder, Marty, Officer Eddie, Birch Barlow, various others

=== Supporting cast ===
- Pamela Hayden as Milhouse Van Houten, Jimbo Jones, Rod Flanders, Janey Powell, various others
- Tress MacNeille as Lunchlady Dora, Lindsey Naegle, Dolph Shapiro, Opal, Agnes Skinner, Brandine Spuckler, Crazy Cat Lady, various others
- Russi Taylor as Martin Prince, Sherri and Terri, various others
- Karl Wiedergott as additional characters
- Maggie Roswell as Helen Lovejoy and various others

=== Special guest stars ===
Season 18 included guest appearances by:

- Marcia Wallace as Edna Krabappel
  (4 episodes)
- Maurice LaMarche as Orson Welles and various other voices
  (4 episodes)
- J. K. Simmons as J. Jonah Jameson and Tabloid editor
  (2 episodes)
- Kiefer Sutherland as The Colonel and Jack Bauer
  (2 episodes)
- Michael Imperioli as Dante Jr.
  ("The Mook, the Chef, the Wife and Her Homer")
- Joe Mantegna as Fat Tony
  ("The Mook, the Chef, the Wife and Her Homer")
- Metallica as themselves
  ("The Mook, the Chef, the Wife and Her Homer")
- Joe Pantoliano as Dante
  ("The Mook, the Chef, the Wife and Her Homer")
- The White Stripes as themselves
  ("Jazzy and the Pussycats")
- Fran Drescher as Female Golem
  ("Treehouse of Horror XVII")
- Richard Lewis as Male Golem
  ("Treehouse of Horror XVII")
- Dr. Phil McGraw as himself
  ("Treehouse of Horror XVII")
- Sir Mix-a-Lot sings "Baby Likes Fat" in "Treehouse of Horror XVII"
- Michael Chabon as himself
  ("Moe'N'a Lisa")
- Jonathan Franzen as himself
  ("Moe'N'a Lisa")
- Gore Vidal as himself
  ("Moe'N'a Lisa")
- Tom Wolfe as himself
  ("Moe'N'a Lisa")
- Elvis Stojko as himself
  ("Kill Gil, Volumes I & II")
- Natalie Portman as Darcy
  ("Little Big Girl")
- Eric Idle as Declan Desmond
  ("Springfield Up")
- Peter Bogdanovich as psychologist
  ("Yokel Chords")
- Andy Dick as himself
  ("Yokel Chords")
- James Patterson as himself
  ("Yokel Chords")
- Meg Ryan as Dr. Swanson
  ("Yokel Chords")
- Stephen Sondheim as himself
  ("Yokel Chords")
- Jon Lovitz as Enrico Irritazio
  ("Homerazzi")
- Betty White as Herself
  ("Homerazzi")
- Ronaldo as Himself
  ("Marge Gamer")
- Stephen Hawking as himself
  ("Stop, or My Dog Will Shoot!")
- Rudy Giuliani as himself
  ("Stop, or My Dog Will Shoot!")
- Mary Lynn Rajskub as Chloe O'Brian
  ("24 Minutes")
- Ludacris as himself
  ("You Kent Always Say What You Want")

== Episodes ==
No. overall	No. in season	Title	Directed by	Written by	Original release date	Prod. code	U.S. viewers (millions)
379	1	"The Mook, the Chef, the Wife and Her Homer"	Michael Marcantel	Bill Odenkirk	September 10, 2006	HABF15	11.63
Lisa becomes friends with Fat Tony's son Michael, who would rather cook than run a crime ring, but when the Simpsons are invited over for dinner and Fat Tony is shot by is rival gang, Homer and Bart volunteer to take his place. Michael sees that power is corrupting them. He invites the rivals to dinner to accept defeat, but they choke on their meals and die. Lisa finds that the food is poisoned, and Fat Tony congratulates Michael on eliminating their enemies. Lisa asks why Michael did it, but he tells her to never ask about his business. Guest Stars: Joe Mantegna, Joe Pantoliano, Michael Imperioli, and Metallica.
380	2	"Jazzy and the Pussycats"	Steven Dean Moore	Daniel Chun	September 17, 2006	HABF18	9.01
Bart gets a drum kit to work out his aggression after being a nuisance at the funeral of Homer's Vegas wife and becomes top pick for a local jazz band, a position that the saxophone-playing Lisa has been going after for years. Seeing Lisa become jealous, Marge lets Lisa adopt a puppy, but she adopts all the sick animals at the shelter. A tiger injures Bart, leaving him unable to play drums. He has a benefit concert to raise money for his surgery, but he uses the money to build a home for the sick animals instead. Guest Stars: The White Stripes.
381	3	"Please Homer, Don't Hammer 'Em"	Mike B. Anderson; Ralph Sosa (co-director)	Matt Warburton	September 24, 2006	HABF20	9.72
Marge takes an interest in carpentry after reading some books on the subject meant for Homer, but when everyone in town declines Marge's services because they believe that women cannot be carpenters, Marge uses Homer as a front. When Homer takes all the credit from Marge, she tells him to repair a roller coaster by himself after they were hire for the job. At its reopening, Homer rides the roller coaster to proves its safety, but Marge prevents the structure from collapsing to keep Homer safe. Homer admits that Marge was performing the carpentry, and they reconcile. Meanwhile, Bart discovers that Principal Skinner is allergic to peanuts and uses his allergy as leverage to make Skinner do his bidding. When he learns that Bart is allergic to shrimp, they fight each other with sticks of peanuts and shrimp until both end up in the hospital from their allergic reactions.
382	4	"Treehouse of Horror XVII"	David Silverman & Matthew Faughnan	Peter Gaffney	November 5, 2006	HABF17	10.46
Season 18's annual trio of Halloween stories. "Married to the Blob" - Homer eats a mysterious green substance from a meteorite landing that turns him into a giant blob with an insatiable, cannibalistic appetite. "You Gotta Know When to Golem" - Bart discovers a golem backstage at Krusty's show and uses it to do his bidding. "The Day the Earth Looked Stupid" - After being fooled by H.G. Wells' War of the Worlds, the citizens of Springfield in 1938 ignore a real alien invasion set up by Kang and Kodos. Guest Stars: Dr. Phil, Richard Lewis, Fran Drescher, Sir Mix-a-Lot, Marcia Wallace and Maurice LaMarche.
383	5	"G.I. (Annoyed Grunt)"	Nancy Kruse	Daniel Chun	November 12, 2006	HABF21	11.43
When Bart agrees to enlist in the army when he turns 18, Marge sends Homer to the recruitment center to undo it. They convince him to join the army. During training, he annoys the colonel assigned to training him. Homer participates in a war game against the colonel. Homer exposes his unit's location, and they escape into Springfield with the colonel's unit in pursuit. While Homer hides, Marge rallies the townsfolk against the colonel and defeats him. The colonel allows Homer to complete his enlistment as a recruiter. Guest Star: Kiefer Sutherland.
384	6	"Moe'N'a Lisa"	Mark Kirkland	Matt Warburton	November 19, 2006	HABF19	9.27
When Homer forgets Moe's birthday, he writes an angry letter to him. Lisa discovers that Moe's written rantings are perfect fodder for poetry and publishes a poem. Moe and the Simpsons are invited to a writer's convention, but when he sees a writer humiliated for admitting needing help for his poetry, he takes all the credit for her work. Moe must write a poem for a dinner in his honor but he struggles. At the dinner, he sees Lisa and writes a poem about her to thank her. They reconcile and leave the dinner together. Guest Stars: Tom Wolfe, Gore Vidal, Michael Chabon, Jonathan Franzen and J.K. Simmons.
385	7	"Ice Cream of Margie (with the Light Blue Hair)"	Matthew Nastuk	Carolyn Omine	November 26, 2006	HABF22	10.93
Homer gets fired once again from the Springfield Nuclear Power Plant, and he takes over Springfield's ice cream truck business after his favorite driver dies. Meanwhile, Marge, depressed over seeing women more successful than her and looking for a way to be remembered, creates sculptures from the discarded Popsicle sticks in Homer's ice cream truck. Marge becomes famous for her popsicle stick sculptures and has a showing for them. On the day it opens, Homer, busy from selling ice cream, rushes home and accidentally run over and destroys the sculptures. Marge locks herself in the bedroom for several days but leaves to unveil a giant sculpture of Homer and declare how she feels about him. However, she realizes that Homer was rushing home because he promised to be at her showing, so she forgives him.
386	8	"The Haw-Hawed Couple"	Chris Clements	Matt Selman	December 10, 2006	JABF02	8.31
Nelson invites his class to his birthday party, but Bart convinces them not to go. Marge forces Bart to attend, so Nelson declares Bart to be his best friend and prevents anyone, including Milhouse, from being near them. When he sees Bart playing with Milhouse, he ends their friendship. However, when they get trapped in a cave during a field trip, Nelson saves Bart, and he remembers the good times they had together. Meanwhile, Homer gets hooked on Lisa's Angelica Button fantasy novels, but worries when he finds out that the book he is reading has a sad ending and tries to hide it from Lisa. He makes up a happy ending for her, but when she reads the real ending, she decides Homer's ending was better.
387	9	"Kill Gil, Volumes I & II"	Bob Anderson	Jeff Westbrook	December 17, 2006	JABF01	8.88
After Gil Gunderson gives Lisa a Malibu Stacy doll reserved for Mr. Costington's daughter, he gets fired as a mall Santa and the Simpsons invite him to dinner and to stay the night. He assumes he is invited to stay permanently, and Marge is unable to tell him to leave. After nearly a year, Marge gets the courage to ask him to leave only to learn Gil had already left for Arizona. Denied her chance, the Simpsons go to Arizona so Marge can say "no" to Gil, but cause him get fired from his new job. They buy a house for him to stay in Arizona. Meanwhile, Homer picks a fight with Ice Capades character The Grumple, who stalks him for a year to try to kill him, but is invited to sing Christmas carols with Gil and the Simpsons at Gil's house in Arizona. Guest Star: Elvis Stojko.
388	10	"The Wife Aquatic"	Lance Kramer	Kevin Curran	January 7, 2007	JABF03	11.62
When Patty and Selma save "Outdoor Movie Night" from going bust by playing an old home movie of their time at Barnacle Bay, Homer decides to surprise Marge by taking her and the kids there, but they find her childhood vacation spot an abandoned wreck. Homer has the residents rebuild the carousel on the pier but a fireworks show destroys the pier, and Homer is forced to catch fish to repay them. His fishing boat encounters a storm, and he is assumed to be lost at sea until he returns and explains how he survived. Guest Stars: Maurice LaMarche and Sab Shimono.
389	11	"Revenge Is a Dish Best Served Three Times"	Mike Frank Polcino	Joel H. Cohen	January 28, 2007	JABF05	8.04
Homer's misguided revenge on the Rich Texan combined with an untimely car breakdown leaves Marge, Lisa, and Bart to tell three tales about revenge gone wrong. "The Count of Monte Fatso": In 19th century France, Moe (Fernand) breaks up the marriage of Homer (Edmond Dantés) and Marge (Mercedes); for this, Homer swears revenge, now in a French prison. "Revenge of the Geeks": Milhouse uses The Getbackinator, an ultra technologic weapon made by Martin, for fight back against the school bullies and the consequences when he goes too far. "Bartman Begins": After Homer (Thomas) and Marge (Martha Wayne) are killed by Snake Jailbird (Joe Chill) in a dark alley, Bart (Bruce Wayne) swears revenge with a superhero alter ego, Bartman.
390	12	"Little Big Girl"	Raymond S. Persi	Don Payne	February 11, 2007	JABF04	8.18
When Cletus ineptly tosses his pipe, Springfield is in danger when the town is about to be hit by a ferocious fire. Bart unwittingly saves the day and is rewarded with a driver's license. However, when he drives to North Haverbrook, he is then engaged with a girl named Darcy who ropes Bart into getting married after declaring that she is pregnant. They go to Utah to get married because they are underaged, but their parents stop them. Meanwhile, Lisa lies about her family heritage in an essay and gets chosen to give a keynote speech at a convention. This situation escalates until Lisa is forced to admit she lied. Guest star: Natalie Portman.
391	13	"Springfield Up"	Chuck Sheetz	Matt Warburton	February 18, 2007	JABF07	8.74
Declan Desmond returns as he shows a documentary about Springfield's current adult population as children, discussing their future aspirations and meeting up with Homer to see if he followed his dreams. Homer pretends to be rich until Mr. Burns drives him away from his summer home. Desmond continues to film Homer to make the other subjects look better until Marge shames him. Desmond films other residents saying good things about Homer, and he learns that he truly is successful and happy. Guest star: Eric Idle.
392	14	"Yokel Chords"	Susie Dietter	Michael Price	March 4, 2007	JABF09	9.04
Lisa becomes a tutor for Cletus Spuckler's children after Principal Skinner bars them from enrolling in Springfield Elementary. During a field trip, Krusty sees them singing and signs them to be an act in his show. Lisa tells Brandine, who admonishes Cletus and takes her children home. Meanwhile, Bart ends up in therapy after scaring his peers with stories of a school chef notorious for cooking children. He bonds with his therapist and becomes depressed when his sessions end. Marge gets him one more session where he has a breakthrough about his behavior. Guest stars: Peter Bogdanovich, Andy Dick, James Patterson, Meg Ryan, and Stephen Sondheim.
393	15	"Rome-Old and Juli-Eh"	Nancy Kruse	Daniel Chun	March 11, 2007	JABF08	8.79
When Grampa gets kicked out of the retirement castle thanks to Homer declaring bankruptcy and discovering that bankruptcy laws have changed, Grampa falls in love with Marge's sister Selma, prompting sworn enemies Homer and Patty to team up to break them up. When their scheme fails, Grampa and Selma get married, but Grampa's senility causes them to end their relationship. Meanwhile, Bart and Lisa con a delivery man into giving them cardboard boxes for a fort, but the delivery men fight back. During their battle at the fort, Nelson saves them, but they get bored and destroy the fort. Guest star: Jane Kaczmarek.
394	16	"Homerazzi"	Matthew Nastuk	J. Stewart Burns	March 25, 2007	JABF06	6.97
After the family photo album is destroyed in a fire involving a Krusty doll and a bottle of cologne, Marge restages all the family's photographs, and when a celebrity dating scandal is captured in the background of one of their photos, the Simpsons strike tabloid gold. Tasting success and seeing money to be made, Homer takes to the streets as one of the paparazzi, capturing Springfield's celebrities at their worst. They fight back and photograph Homer on his bad behavior, causing him to give up. As they celebrate with a decedent party, Homer photographs them but will not release them if they treat their fans with respect. Guest stars: J.K. Simmons, Betty White and Jon Lovitz.
395	17	"Marge Gamer"	Bob Anderson	J. Stewart Burns	April 22, 2007	JABF10	6.46
Marge discovers the wonders of the Internet and becomes hooked on an online roleplaying game, where Bart is the game master. He bonds with Marge until she redecorates his trophy room and accidentally kills her character in a rage. Feeling guilty, he revives her, but in his weakened state, the other players kill him. Meanwhile, Homer must referee Lisa's soccer matches. She takes advantage of Homer to get penalty kicks until Homer realizes what is happening an ejects her. He shows her a documentary of soccer riots and fights and realizes that Homer was right. Guest star: Ronaldo
396	18	"The Boys of Bummer"	Rob Oliver	Michael Price	April 29, 2007	JABF11	7.57
Bart becomes a town pariah after losing the championship for Springfield's Little League team, and is driven insane to the point of suicide from constant harassment. Marge admonishes the town and has the teams pretend to replay the game until Bart's team wins. Meanwhile, Homer gets a job at Costington's Department store as a mattress salesman. He sells one to the Lovejoys, who do not like it, so he trades his own for theirs. When Homer and Marge are uncomfortable with it, they and the Lovejoys cut the Simpsons' old mattress in half to share it.
397	19	"Crook and Ladder"	Lance Kramer	Bill Odenkirk	May 6, 2007	JABF13	7.77
When reading a parenting magazine, Marge follows the advice too literally and throws away Maggie's pacifier. However, when the pacifier is thrown in the trash, Maggie goes on a path of destruction in the Simpsons' home. A squeak toy calms her, but leaves Homer unable to sleep, so he takes a drug that makes him sleepwalk. Bart has him drive in this state, causing him to crash into a fire station and injure the firefighters. Homer, Moe, Apu, and Principal Skinner become volunteer firefighters and begin stealing items from the homes whose fires they extinguish as a reward. When Marge and the kids learn what they are doing, they shame them until them stop.
398	20	"Stop, or My Dog Will Shoot!"	Matthew Faughnan	John Frink	May 13, 2007	JABF12	6.54
When Homer gets lost in a cornfield maze, Santa's Little Helper rescues him and becomes a local hero, which prompts the Simpson family to enroll him in Police Dog Academy, where he dons a new and more stern personality. However, he becomes jaded when he catches Snake Jailbird, who is released on a technicality, and bites Bart, causing the family to give him away. Meanwhile, Bart, missing Santa's Little Helper, gets a strangling snake as a new pet. When he shows his snake at school, and it causes a hazardous situation, Santa's Little Helper comes to save Bart and returns to the family. Guest stars: Stephen Hawking, Maurice LaMarche, and Rudolph Giuliani (in a deleted scene that would later be reinstated in syndicated airings).
399	21	"24 Minutes"	Raymond S. Persi	Billy Kimball & Ian Maxtone-Graham	May 20, 2007	JABF14	9.94
Jimbo, Dolph, and Kearney plan on sabotaging Springfield Elementary School's annual bake sale by releasing the "ultimate stink bomb", a rotten yogurt cup from Springfield's Nuclear Power Plant. Meanwhile, Marge attempts to make the perfect cake for the school bake sale. Bart and Lisa learn what the bullies plan to do and attempt to stop them, but Bart becomes trapped in a room filling with rising water. Marge uses her cake to break the window to save Bart, and Lisa defuses the bomb in time. Guest stars: Kiefer Sutherland and Mary Lynn Rajskub.
400	22	"You Kent Always Say What You Want"	Matthew Nastuk	Tim Long	May 20, 2007	JABF15	9.94
Due to Ned Flanders' meddling, Kent Brockman gets in trouble for blurting a horrible curse word during a soft-news interview about Homer winning Phineas Q. Butterfat's 1,000,000th ice cream cone, and gets fired for allegedly being a cocaine addict. While living with the Simpsons, Brockman teams up with Lisa to create a YouTube video revealing why a politically conservative media empire like Fox would create raunchy television shows. To stop him, Brockman is offered his job back with a raise, and he accepts. Homer consoles a disappointed Lisa while Fox censors him from telling a secret about the network. Guest stars: Ludacris and Maurice LaMarche.: This is the show's 400th episode.

== Production ==
This season and the following season were ordered in March 2006. Al Jean remained as showrunner, a role he had since the thirteenth season. This season included the 400th episode of the series and marked the 20th anniversary of the Simpson characters' debut on The Tracey Ullman Show. Regarding the show's longevity, executive producer James L. Brooks commented that the fan base of the show was being "replenished" with younger fans as current fans become older. He thought the work environment remained the same as it was in the beginning but with more creative independence.

== Reception ==
=== Critical response ===
Robert Canning of IGN gave the season a 6.6 saying it was "Passable" and that "Now in its eighteenth season (go ahead, say that out loud: 'eighteen seasons'), The Simpsons continues to supply America with a decent half-hour of comedy every Sunday night. However, most long-time fans of the show agree that the last several years have seen the program in constant decline. Looking back at this particular season, there's little evidence to prove them wrong. Though we were treated with at least a few hilarious gems this year, the mediocre (to the downright terrible) heavily outweighed the great."

Colin Jacobson of DVD Movie Guide called the season "lackluster" and said it was a step back from the previous season. He attributed this to The Simpsons Movie "absorbing much of the show's talent" and concluded, "Season 18 will be a must-see for Simpsons fans, but it's not a great offering." Stuart Galbraith IV of DVD Talk wrote, "Season 18 on DVD certainly has some evidence of that, but almost every episode still offers at least a laugh, and some of the episodes in that collection are quite funny." John Schwarz of Bubbleblabber gave it a nine out of ten, saying, "For both die-hard Simpsons fans and seasoned series stalwarts alike, this collection is a must-have. If you like the special features, you might want more at the end, but there's so much commentary on the episodes that it'll keep you busy for a while."

=== Awards ===
At the 35th Annie Awards, Alf Clausen and Michael Price won the award for "Best Music in an Animated Television Production" for "Yokel Chords" while Ian Maxtone-Graham and Billy Kimball won "Best Writing in an Animated Television Production" for "24 Minutes" Jeff Westbrook won a WGA Award for "Kill Gil, Volumes I & II" while Matt Selman was nominated for "The Haw-Hawed Couple" and John Frink received a nomination for "Stop, or My Dog Will Shoot!".

The series also received a British Comedy Award nomination for "Best International Comedy" a Primetime Emmy Award nomination for Outstanding Animated Program for "The Haw-Hawed Couple" and an Environmental Media Award nomination for "Best Television Episodic Comedy" for "The Wife Aquatic".

=== Nielsen ratings ===
The show ranked 60th in the seasonal ratings with an average of 8.6 million watching it and a Nielsen rating of 4.1/10.

== Blu-ray and DVD release ==
Series showrunner Al Jean reported in April 2015 that The Simpsons would no longer see home media releases after the seventeenth season, claiming an inability for DVD sales to keep up with the rise in streaming and downloads, as well as a boom in FXX reruns, and Fox's on-demand video service, FXNOW. Jean reassured that bonus features commonly featured on the DVDs, such as commentaries for each episode, would still be available, now packaged with the digital format.

In 2016, audio commentary for the 18th season was made available exclusively through FXNOW.

On Saturday, July 22, 2017, it was announced during the 2017 San Diego Comic-Con panel that, due to fan demand, the eighteenth season DVD would be released after all on Tuesday, December 5, 2017, in the United States and Canada by 20th Century Fox Home Entertainment, ten years after it had completed broadcast on television.

The Complete Eighteenth Season
Set Details			Special Features
22 episodes; 4-disc set (DVD); 1.33:1 aspect ratio; AUDIO; English 5.1 Dolby Digital; Spanish 2.0 Dolby Surround; French 2.0 Dolby Surround; SUBTITLES; English SDH; Spanish			Optional commentaries for all 22 episodes; Welcome Back, Loyal Fans!; Deleted Scenes (Only on Disc 4); The Mook, the Chef, the Wife and Her Homer; Jazzy and the Pussycats; Please Homer, Don't Hammer 'Em; Treehouse of Horror XVII; Moe'N'a Lisa; The Wife Aquatic; Revenge Is a Dish Best Served Three Times; Rome-Old and Juli-Eh; Homerazzi; The Boys of Bummer; Crook and Ladder; 24 Minutes; Extra Deleted Scenes; Jazzy and the Pussycats; Treehouse of Horror XVII; G.I. (Annoyed Grunt); The Wife Aquatic; Rome-Old and Juli-Eh; Homerazzi; You Kent Always Say What You Want; Special Language Feature; The Mook, the Chef, the Wife and Her Homer; Czech 2.0 Dolby Surround; German 2.0 Dolby Surround; Italian 2.0 Dolby Surround; Hungarian 2.0 Dolby Surround; Multi-Angle Animation Showcase; The Mook, the Chef, the Wife and Her Homer; Featurette; A Conversation with Fat Tony; Bonus Episode: "22 for 30"
Release Dates
Region 1	Region 2	Region 4	
Tuesday, December 5, 2017	Monday, December 11, 2017	Wednesday, December 13, 2017	
