= Homerazzi =

- The Simpsons episode
- Promotional artwork for "Homerazzi". In the photos, top to bottom: the tabloid editor, Enrico Irritazio and Betty White.
- Episode no.: Season 18; Episode 16
- Directed by: Matthew Nastuk
- Written by: J. Stewart Burns
- Production code: JABF06
- Original air date: March 25, 2007

Guest appearances
- Jon Lovitz as Enrico Irritazio; J. K. Simmons as Tabloid editor; Betty White as Herself

Episode features
- Chalkboard gag: "Global Warming did not eat my homework"
- Couch gag: Homer goes from prehistory to modern history as he starts out as a unicellular being and evolves into many creatures until he finally reaches the modern day and evolves into the present Homer. When he comes in the house, Marge asks Homer, "What took you so long?" and Homer sighs in exhaustion.
- Commentary: Al Jean; J. Stewart Burns; Michael Price; Tom Gammill; Max Pross; David Silverman; Yeardley Smith

Episode chronology
← Previous "Rome-Old and Juli-Eh"	Next → "Marge Gamer"
- The Simpsons season 18

"Homerazzi" is the sixteenth episode of the eighteenth season of the American animated television series The Simpsons. It originally aired on the Fox network in the United States on March 25, 2007. The episode was written by J. Stewart Burns and directed by Matthew Nastuk.

In this episode, Homer becomes a celebrity photographer until they seek revenge by photographing him on his worst behavior. J. K. Simmons guest starred as the tabloid editor, and Jon Lovitz guest starred as Enrico Irritazio. Betty White appeared as herself. The episode received positive reviews.

== Plot ==
After failing to blow out the candles on his birthday cake, an exhausted Homer falls asleep on the cake, igniting his party hat. The burning house is saved by the Springfield Fire Department, and Marge purchases a fire-proof safe to protect the family's valuables, including the family photo album, as a precaution. Each family member places one item in the safe, but after it is closed, the items combine to start a fire that destroys both them and the safe. Refusing to accept the loss of all their memories, Marge restages all the family photos. One shot captures a celebrity sex scandal in the background, and Homer sells the photo to a tabloid. Tasting success and seeing money to be made, Homer takes to the streets as one of the paparazzi.

Homer begins taking photos of celebrities going about their daily lives. He and Bart provoke several local celebrities to commit embarrassing or criminal acts, and then he takes pictures of them. He insults Drederick Tatum and photographs him as Tatum punches him. Homer receives praise for selling the photos to the tabloid. He turns Lisa's bedroom into a darkroom to develop photographs. Marge asks Homer to stop exploiting celebrities but admits to liking the tabloid stories. Later, he invades the secluded wedding of Rainier Luftwaffe Wolfcastle and Maria Shriver-Kennedy Quimby, prompting Wolfcastle to swear revenge.

Wolfcastle gathers the celebrities and says he has hired top paparazzo Enrico Irritazio to photograph Homer on his worst behavior. After photos of Homer are published in the tabloid, he gives up the paparazzi business. As the celebrities celebrate their victory in a nightclub across the street from Moe's Tavern, Lenny and Carl persuade Homer to resume his work using a camera that Moe had hidden in the ladies' room. Homer bursts in on the celebrities and takes many compromising photos. Wolfcastle asks Homer what he plans to do with the pictures. Homer says that he will not make them public if the celebrities start treating their fans with more respect and stop taking them for granted. Wolfcastle agrees and, in a show of good faith, invites the Simpsons to a barbecue at an offshore "party platform" he owns. Here, Marge shows Wolfcastle a screenplay she has written but turns her down. Later, she and Homer find that Wolfcastle has stolen the idea and turned it into a movie. Marge does not mind the theft because the movie got produced.

== Casting ==
Recurring actor Jon Lovitz, who has played several characters in the series, guest starred as Enrico Irritazio. J. K. Simmons guest-starred as a tabloid editor. Simmons guest starred earlier in the season in the episode "Moe'N'a Lisa" as J. Jonah Jameson. Actress Betty White appeared as herself. White previously appeared in the eleventh season episode "Missionary: Impossible". Actor Harry Hamlin and musician Peter Wolf were announced as guest stars but did not appear.

== Reception ==
=== Viewing figures ===
The episode earned a 2.5 rating and was watched by 6.97 million viewers, which was the 43rd most-watched show that week.

=== Critical response ===
Robert Canning of IGN praised this episode, calling it clever, ingenious, and one of the most memorable of the season.

Adam Finley of TV Squad thought the episode had many sight gags but said the episode could have been better. He wrote that it was a "silly episode with no serious point" and the long couch gag indicated that the episode would be shorter.

On Four Finger Discount, Guy Davis and Brendan Dando enjoyed the episode and thought the quality matched the episodes of the classic Simpsons era of the 1990s. They also felt it could not have been made in that era due to the perception of paparazzi at the time.

The couch gag was one of the longest in the history of the series. In 2015, IGN named it the second-best couch gag in the history of the series. In 2022, Comic Book Resources named it the third-best couch gag.

=== Themes and analysis ===
Sergio Yagüe-Pasamón wrote that this episode demonstrates that the stereotypical male role in Western society is public-facing while the female role is hidden in private. When Marge's photos are destroyed in the safe, she "cried over the loss of the family album of photographic memories. The symbolic importance of the photo collection is noteworthy, as Marge acknowledges it to integrate 'a record of my accomplishments' and compares it to the 'resumé of a man.'"
