= Jazzy and the Pussycats =

- The Simpsons episode
- Promotional image for the episode featuring Jack White and Meg White of The White Stripes, Bart and Milhouse. Milhouse does not appear in that scene, though he does briefly appear in the funeral of Homer's Vegas wife.
- Episode no.: Season 18; Episode 2
- Directed by: Steven Dean Moore
- Written by: Daniel Chun
- Production code: HABF18
- Original air date: September 17, 2006

Guest appearances
- Meg White as herself; Jack White as himself; Larina Jean Adamson as Waitress

Episode features
- Couch gag: Everyone (except for Homer) is sitting on the couch. A giant ape who looks like Homer grabs Marge through the window and takes her to the top of the Empire State Building as biplanes begin attacking him.
- Commentary: Al Jean; Matt Selman; Michael Price; Tom Gammill; Max Pross; David Silverman; Steven Dean Moore; Raymond S. Persi

Episode chronology
← Previous "The Mook, the Chef, the Wife and Her Homer"	Next → "Please Homer, Don't Hammer 'Em"
- The Simpsons season 18

"Jazzy and the Pussycats" is the second episode of the eighteenth season of the American animated television series The Simpsons. It first aired on the Fox network in the United States on September 17, 2006. When Bart turns a quiet funeral into a chaotic mess, Homer and Marge are faced with angry Springfielders who have had enough of Bart's mischievousness. But when a psychiatrist assists Bart by channelling Bart's anger through drums, Lisa feels Bart may have stolen the one thing she held strong: music. As a result, Lisa begins collecting animals to subdue her misery. It was written by Daniel Chun and directed by Steven Dean Moore. Meg White and Jack White of the White Stripes guest star as themselves. In its original run, the episode received 8.94 million viewers.

== Plot ==
Amber, Homer's "Vegas wife", dies of a drug overdose, so the Simpson family attends her funeral. A bored Bart plays a game of paddleball, but the game goes awry when the ball flies into several people's mouths, causing mayhem. Homer and Marge are faced with the angry churchgoers, who have had enough of Bart's antics. As a result, he is forced to see a psychiatrist, who suggests Bart get a drum set in order to harness his anger and the energy he has and find the focus and discipline that he needs. Bart gets a kit and shows a natural talent for drumming. He practices non-stop, even while asleep, and, even, has a run in with The White Stripes on the street, earning Bart an enmity with them. Eventually, his continuous drumming drives Homer and Marge mad, and Lisa suggests to her parents that she can take Bart to a jazz brunch.

Lisa asks Bart to play along with her quintet, and Bart easily overshadows everyone, including Lisa. When a legendary jazz group asks him to play with them, Lisa is angered, as she is the more experienced and passionate of the two. Lisa then tries to overtake Bart in his passion of skateboarding, which ends in failure. Marge, who does not want Lisa to compete against Bart, decides to let her adopt a puppy in order to make her happy. At the animal shelter, Lisa picks a healthy puppy over a very sick one that would otherwise die. Later that night, the sick dog appears in a ghost-like form to tell her that his fate is doomed because she chose the other dog over him. Lisa decides to go back and adopt the sick puppy, but after seeing how sick many of them are, she decides to adopt them all in order to save their lives. On her way home, many other animals join her, including a group of circus animals. Having nowhere to put them, Lisa puts them in the attic. After dinner that night, Lisa goes into the attic and finds Bart and his jazz group with the animals she rescued. A tiger bites Bart's arm, causing extensive nerve damage that leaves him unable to play.

In order to raise money for the operation he needs, Bart organizes a benefit concert. Meanwhile, Lisa is informed that her animals will be taken to a pound and put down if she cannot find a suitable home for them. The concert is a success, and Bart feels empathy for Lisa and decides to use the money to build a home for the animals instead. The other musicians begin to discuss the idea of holding another benefit to repair Bart's arm.

== Cultural references ==
- The title is a play on the fictitious rock band Josie and the Pussycats.
- The jazz venue's logo is similar to the letters in the House of Blues logo.
- The White Stripes' sequence is identical in style to their music video for "The Hardest Button to Button". The two are also wearing the same outfits they wore in the video. The guitar Jack is playing in the episode is his famous JB Hutto Montgomery Airline.
- The Blue Man Group are seen at the funeral; when someone gives a choking member the Heimlich maneuver, a multitude of balls start falling out, and the member's face becomes a "regular" color.
- Gunter and Ernst are also seen at Amber's funeral. Amber and Ginger are seen with them at the end of "Viva Ned Flanders", saying they "know how to treat a woman."
- The scene where Lisa accumulates animals while strolling down the street is a nod to the opening credits from Quentin Tarantino's 1992 film Reservoir Dogs and the song "Little Green Bag" by George Baker can be heard.
- When Bart sits in with the professional jazz musicians, the song they play is "Big Noise From Winnetka" by Bob Haggart.
- Other songs heard include "Take Five", by Dave Brubeck and "Killer Joe", by Benny Golson.
- At Jazzy Goodtimes, Ralph Wiggum plays a Fisher-Price Corn Popper.
- The Jazzy Goodtimes club is a facsimile of the House of Blues nightclub on the Sunset Strip in Hollywood, Ca.
- Moe calls the 1997 film Titanic "unsinkable at the box office."
- The couch gag references the King Homer segment from "Treehouse of Horror III" which in turn spoofs King Kong.
- A mentioned jazz musician shares the name CSI: Miami.
- At the beginning of the jazz benefit, they play "Caravan" by Duke Ellington.
- Richard Sakai, a real-life Simpsons producer, is listed amongst the jazz singers with 'funny names'; Sakai was first seen in an earlier Simpsons episode, "One Fish, Two Fish, Blowfish, Blue Fish," in which he sang karaoke at the sushi bar where some of the episode takes place.

== Reception ==
In its original run, the episode was watched by 8.94 million viewers.

Dan Iverson of IGN quotes that like the previous episode, it was decent, and praised the strength of the eighteenth season so far. He called the White Stripes' cameo funny, and called the episode entirely random, starting off with the death of Homer's Vegas wife Amber. He gives the episode a final rating of 7/10, similar to the previous episode.

Colin Jacobson of DVD Movie Guide liked the first half of the episode involving Bart but did not like Lisa's plot with the animals.

On Four Finger Discount, Guy Davis and Brendan Dando thought it was a repeat of previous plots involving Lisa being jealous of Bart's success. They thought the White Stripes filled the same stunt casting role that Metallica filled in the previous episode.

In 2007, Simon Crerar of The Times listed The White Stripes' performance as one of the thirty-three funniest cameos in the history of the show.

Andrew Martin of Prefix Mag named The White Stripes his seventh favorite musical guests on The Simpsons out of a list of ten. Corey Deiterman of the Houston Press listed them as number four of the top five worst musical guests in Simpsons history.
