= G.I. (Annoyed Grunt) =

- The Simpsons episode
- The episode's promotional image featuring Homer, Cletus, and the Colonel.
- Episode no.: Season 18; Episode 5
- Directed by: Nancy Kruse
- Written by: Daniel Chun
- Production code: HABF21
- Original air date: November 12, 2006

Guest appearances
- Kiefer Sutherland as The Colonel; Maurice LaMarche as The Assistant Colonel

Episode features
- Chalkboard gag: "We are not all naked under our clothes"
- Couch gag: The Simpsons are on a carwash conveyor belt; they get washed, blasted with wax, scrubbed with prickly brushes, resulting with Marge's bushy hair and Maggie with a fresh pacifier.
- Commentary: Al Jean; Matt Selman; Michael Price; Tom Gammill & Max Pross; Mark Kirkland

Episode chronology
← Previous "Treehouse of Horror XVII"	Next → "Moe'N'a Lisa"
- The Simpsons season 18

"G.I. (Annoyed Grunt)", also known as "G.I. D'oh", is the fifth episode of the eighteenth season of the American animated television series The Simpsons. It first aired on the Fox network in the United States on November 12, 2006. The episode was written by Daniel Chun and directed by Nancy Kruse, while Kiefer Sutherland makes his first of two guest appearances this season. Maurice LaMarche does additional voices. In its original run, the episode received 11.43 million viewers. The episode is a critique of the U.S. military-industrial complex.

== Plot ==
In this episode, at the Springfield Mall, Bart and Milhouse torment the bullies as they work in a shoe store. When the manager leaves, however, they are stripped to their underwear by the bullies and hung in the store window. Two US Army recruiters fail to tempt Jimbo, Dolph and Kearney. Realizing that even the dumbest teenagers in the dumbest city in the dumbest US state do not want to join the Army, they decide to start targeting children. During a surprise assembly at Springfield Elementary, the recruiters show a short movie depicting the Army as a high-tech adventure. According to the film, soldiers fly around in attack helicopters destroying evildoers by day and rocking out in front of thousands of screaming fans by night. The students are easily swayed and quickly line up to enlist.

An excited Bart comes home from school and shows Homer and Marge his delayed entry program form. Though Homer is impressed, Marge is appalled at the idea of Bart joining the Army when he turns 18, prompting her to send Homer down to the recruitment center to get Bart out of his contract. Homer reluctantly forces the two recruiters to tear up Bart's paperwork, though he apologizes for it, saying that it was Marge who told him to do so. Upon learning this, the recruiters prey upon Homer's gullibility and convince him to enlist instead. At the post Homer infuriates his new hard-nosed colonel (Kiefer Sutherland). Homer loves the sound of the colonel's noticeably "awesome" gravelly voice. While the majority of recruits are assigned to the infantry, Homer, and a group of stupid recruits, are assigned to a rehabilitation platoon. During field training exercises at night, Homer and the other stupid recruits are given the role of the opposing force, (China). Upon learning that it is a live fire exercise, with the weapons to be tested on them, the unit tries to hide. Homer, mistaking gunfire for Chinese New Year, accidentally exposes his unit's location by launching a flare gun in the air. The flare blinds the colonel and his men, who were all wearing night vision goggles. Homer and his unit soon escape into Springfield while the Army gives chase and invades the city.

As the colonel and his troops patrol Springfield searching for him, Homer sneaks back home. Marge and Homer are surprised by a camera equipped toy helicopter and (in a scene reminiscent of many classic cartoon chases) Homer attempts to avoid it, running through the entire house, eventually leading the helicopter into a downstairs closet full of TNT and dynamite. He locks the door behind the UAV and the closet explodes. To avoid the army, Homer reluctantly hides out at the Retirement Castle with Grandpa. Marge rallies the Springfield community in coordinated resistance to the occupiers through a word of mouth campaign. The citizens spike the town reservoir with alcohol, intoxicating the occupying forces. The colonel's resulting hangover is so great he reluctantly surrenders to the townsfolk, stipulating only that Homer finish his enlistment. Homer does so by becoming a recruiter.

During the closing credits, a martial scoring of The Simpsons theme plays and the colonel voices "frontline infantry" assignments to nearly every cast and crew member (one exception being Kiefer Sutherland, who is assigned to the United States Coast Guard), as the credits roll.

== Cultural references ==
The episode title is a reference to G.I. Joe. The army video game shoots down Osama bin Laden, Adolf Hitler, Jason Voorhees and a "deadly hurricane". The music is taken from Sergei Prokofiev's score for Sergei Eisenstein's Alexander Nevsky. Marge references an earlier episode with a similar plot, "Simpson Tide", in which Homer joins the U.S. Navy after being fired and causes an international incident. The episode parodies several scenes from Stanley Kubrick's Full Metal Jacket (1987). Homer wonders if the drill sergeant will ask the recruits "what our major malfunction is" (Homer's is he cares too much). The drill sergeant gives Homer the nickname "Snowflake" (in the film Full Metal Jacket one of the Black recruits is nicknamed "Snowball" by the drill sergeant as an ironic jibe). Later, Homer receives a punishment of being made to eat doughnuts while the other recruits have to do push-ups. Homer mentions Stripes when heading for Moe's basement, and imagines the greatest leader as Cap'n Crunch. The scene with Homer being chased by the mini helicopter parodies the style seen in many Looney Tunes and Merrie Melodies cartoons. The scene makes a nod to Bugs Bunny, the Road Runner and Tom and Jerry. The scene ends with a computer monitor showing the "That's All Folks!" end title card. The episode also contains the melody of Johnny I Hardly Knew Ye. The song that the U.S. Army plays on stage during the video shown at the school is a variant of "Communication Breakdown" by Led Zeppelin. During the training scene, the Martika song "Toy Soldiers" plays. The episode also includes a reference to the abuse of prisoners at Abu Ghraib prison when Homer says that the Army will strip people naked, put a bag over their face, and have hicks laugh at them.

== Reception ==
In its original run, the episode received 11.43 million viewers, and garnered mixed-to-mostly negative reviews.

Adam Finley of TV Squad praised that the episode was entirely random, and enjoyed the parody of Looney Tunes. Dan Iverson of IGN however, hated the episode, giving it 3.5 out of 10, calling it "painfully unfunny", and "the show's attempt to satirize the state of the U.S. military simply crossed the line of good taste". He concluded that it was "by far" the worst episode of the season, and "quite possibly" the worst episode in the entire of The Simpsons history. He did, however, enjoy the Looney Tunes parody and Sutherland's guest performance. Conservative commentator Michelle Malkin criticized the episode, writing, "the mockery of Army recruiters and enlistees is absolutely disgusting."
