= Revenge Is a Dish Best Served Three Times =

- The Simpsons episode
- Episode no.: Season 18; Episode 11
- Directed by: Michael Polcino
- Written by: Joel H. Cohen
- Production code: JABF05
- Original air date: January 28, 2007

Episode features
- Couch gag: The Simpsons are infants who crawl to the couch while "Twinkle, Twinkle, Little Star" plays in the background. After reaching the couch, they grow up to their normal ages. Maggie remains a baby.
- Commentary: Al Jean; Joel H. Cohen; Matt Selman; Tom Gammill; Max Pross; Joe Mantegna; Michael Polcino; Michael Marcantel

Episode chronology
← Previous "The Wife Aquatic"	Next → "Little Big Girl"
- The Simpsons season 18

"Revenge Is a Dish Best Served Three Times" is the eleventh episode of the eighteenth season of the American animated television series The Simpsons. It originally aired on the Fox network in the United States on January 28, 2007. The episode was written by Joel H. Cohen and directed by Michael Polcino.

In this episode, three stories are told about revenge as Homer seeks it after the Rich Texan cuts off the Simpsons' car on their way to their vacation. The episode received mixed reviews.

== Plot ==
After the Simpsons' car is cut off by the Rich Texan while driving to the airport for their Miami vacation, Homer's motivation for revenge prompts his family to tell three stories concerning vengeance, hoping to convince him that pursuing revenge is not a good idea.

=== The Count of Monte Fatso ===
Marge tells a cautionary tale of revenge taking place in 19th century France, parodying the 1844 novel The Count of Monte Cristo by Alexandre Dumas.

Moe breaks up the marriage of Homer and Marge by framing Homer as an English traitor. Moe marries Marge, and Homer, now in a French prison, swears revenge. His cellmate, Mr. Burns, leads him to a buried treasure. With its riches, Homer becomes the Count of Monte Cristo. Five years later, he kills Moe with a homemade machine, expecting Marge to take him back. She angrily rebuffs him, showing him the triplets she had with Moe.

At the end of the story, Marge's explanation is that revenge can lead to misery and sadness. However, she finds that Homer had got distracted from her story by the car radio, requiring another story.

=== Revenge of the Geeks ===
Titled as a parody on the movie Revenge of the Nerds, Lisa's story revolves around Milhouse's campaign to fight back against the school bullies and the consequences when he goes too far.

Tired of being bullied by Jimbo, Dolph, and Kearney, the geeks plan their revenge. In the science lab, Martin creates The Getbackinator, a ray gun that makes people perform various playground tortures on themselves such as wedgies and wet willies. Milhouse uses the weapon on the bullies, but then begins attacking anyone who has ever (accidentally or on purpose) wronged him, including his own friends and a new student out of "prevenge". Lisa eventually convinces Milhouse to stop, and he reluctantly throws the device aside. Afterwards, Nelson returns from an absence due to mumps, finds the weapon and ends up using it against Milhouse.

Lisa claims the moral of the story is that taking revenge makes a person as bad as those who hurt them. Homer is not convinced and instead proclaims the lesson to be to never put down your weapon.

=== Bartman Begins ===
Having missed their flight to Hawaii, Homer begins to approach the Rich Texan to enact his revenge until Bart offers to recount "Bartman's origin story", in a parody of Batman.

After leaving the Opera House, Homer and Marge are killed by Snake Jailbird in a dark alley. Bart swears revenge on him, creating his superhero alter ego, Bartman. He is helped by his grandfather, who used to fight crime as the Crimson Cockatoo. When Snake attempts to steal the "Stealable Jewels of the Orient" from the Gotham Natural History Museum, Bartman arrives and kills him, impaling him on the fangs of a snake specimen. Afterward, Lisa asks Bart if killing Snake was worth it, as it didn't bring his parents back. Bart replies that he feels a little better, plus he has "zillions of dollars" and no parents to tell him what to do.

During the story, Homer is seen to have made amends with the Rich Texan after hearing that they are both from Connecticut.

Before the credits roll, a dedication is shown to all the characters who died in the Star Wars films.

== Cultural references ==
Homer cites the Iraq War as his excuse for seeking revenge. When the war was initiated, there was a question of whether President George W. Bush was seeking revenge against Saddam Hussein.

== Reception ==
=== Viewing figures ===
The episode earned a 2.8 rating and was watched by 8.04 million viewers, which was the 38th most-watched show that week.

=== Critical response ===
Dan Iverson of IGN gave the episode a rating of 7.7, writing,

While there was some really funny material in the episode, "Revenge Is a Dish Best Served Three Times" was still under par for The Simpsons. "The Count of Monte Fatso" showed the fact that the writers can still do a silly parody well, but the other two stories were rather mediocre, relying on gags and humorous visuals to make the segments passable. The trilogy style of episodes continues to be very entertaining, and even though this particular episode wasn't astounding, we will still anticipate the next time that the show gives us parody stories with our favorite television family.

Adam Finley of TV Squad said he would have preferred to have one of the stories expanded to a full episode because there was not enough time for each story. However, he enjoyed what he saw.

Colin Jacobson of DVD Movie Guide said the episode's stories were "tepid parodies" and "a disappointment."

In 2019, Rolling Stone named this episode the 138th best episode of the series.
