= The Mook, the Chef, the Wife and Her Homer =

- The Simpsons episode
- Episode no.: Season 18; Episode 1
- Directed by: Michael Marcantel
- Written by: Bill Odenkirk
- Production code: HABF15
- Original air date: September 10, 2006

Guest appearances
- Michael Imperioli as Dante Jr.; Joe Mantegna as Fat Tony; Metallica as themselves; Joe Pantoliano as Dante

Episode features
- Couch gag: The couch is replaced by four wooden chairs. An instrumental version of "Pop Goes the Weasel" plays as the family goes around the chairs playing the game Musical chairs. When the music stops, everyone but Homer grabs a seat.
- Commentary: Al Jean; Matt Selman; Joel H. Cohen; Tom Gammill; Max Pross; Joe Mantegna; Michael Marcantel; Michael Polcino

Episode chronology
← Previous "Marge and Homer Turn a Couple Play"	Next → "Jazzy and the Pussycats"
- The Simpsons season 18

"The Mook, the Chef, the Wife and Her Homer" is the first episode of the eighteenth season of the American animated television series The Simpsons. It first aired on the Fox network in the United States on September 10, 2006. In the episode, Fat Tony is put out of commission by a rival family, then Homer and Bart take over the Springfield Mafia.

The episode was written by Bill Odenkirk and directed by Michael Marcantel. Metallica guest star as themselves, while Michael Imperioli and Joe Pantoliano guest star as Fat Tony's enemies, Dante Jr. and Dante, respectively. In its original broadcast, "The Mook, the Chef, the Wife and Her Homer" was watched by around 11.5 million people and received a 5.3 Nielsen rating. This episode is unavailable for streaming on Disney+ in Singapore.

== Plot ==
Left to right: Hans Moleman, James Hetfield, Lars Ulrich, Kirk Hammett and Robert Trujillo

After Bart humiliates him in front of Metallica, Otto spanks him, leading to his suspension from driving the school bus. With this, Marge has to drive carpool to several of Bart and Lisa's classmates, including Michael, the son of Fat Tony. News of Michael's family spreads, and everyone tries to keep their distance from him. However, Lisa chooses to befriend Michael and discovers that he is a talented cook who dreams of being a chef, rather than going into the family business of "waste management".

When Fat Tony takes a turn driving the children home from school, they find themselves attacked by the Calabresi family, although Fat Tony manages to elude them. Michael then invites the Simpson family over for dinner, but the Calabresis show up unexpectedly for a sit-down. When soufflés are served to the mobsters, they are at first impressed, but the Calabresis go on to mock Michael after he reveals that he was the one who made them. Fat Tony admonishes Michael for making him look weak in front of his enemies before he is suddenly gunned down by an attack helicopter, leaving him comatose.

With no leadership, Johnny Tightlips urges a reluctant Michael to step up as boss, but Homer and Bart volunteer in his place. They then proceed to handle Fat Tony's business, extorting Moe and Krusty, as well as taking several luxury items for themselves. Eventually, Michael notices how the power is corrupting Homer and Bart and seeks to put an end to it.

Michael invites the Calabresis to the Simpsons' house for dinner, where he concedes defeat and states that he is out of the family business. They applaud his decision, but end up choking and dying over their meals. Marge discovers the food has been poisoned, and although Michael appears remorseful, Lisa finds out it was intentional. After Fat Tony congratulates Michael for taking down their enemies, Lisa asks Michael why he did not tell Fat Tony it was all an accident. He then bluntly tells her to never ask him about his business.

== Cultural references ==
The title is a reference to The Cook, the Thief, His Wife and Her Lover. Homer says the greatest mob film of all time was Shark Tale. The 2004 animated film took its general storyline from The Godfather although it transferred the material into a PG-rated animated film. The ending of the episode is a reference to the ending of The Godfather, including the music - "the godfather waltz" by Nino Rota. Guest star Michael Imperioli was chosen for his role as Christopher Moltisanti in The Sopranos. The Sopranos intro is played when Fat Tony and his crew drive through Springfield.

== Reception ==
Dan Iverson of IGN wrote that the episode was "charming", and that he enjoyed its parody of The Godfather, praising Pantoliano and Imperioli's appearances. He also wrote that as the episode was too random, he missed the emotional impact it should have had, giving the episode a final rating of 7/10.

Colin Jacobson of DVD Movie Guide thought it was a good start to the season. He said the episode "adds new spice to the concept" of The Godfather parodies previously done on the series.

On Four Finger Discount, Guy Davis and Brendan Dando liked the episode and thought the guest stars were playing characters similar to the types they are known to play.

In 2007, Simon Crerar of The Times listed Metallica's performance as one of the 33 funniest cameos in the history of the show.
