= The Boys of Bummer =

- The Simpsons episode
- Barney emblazoned with "I Hate Bart Simpson".
- Episode no.: Season 18; Episode 18
- Directed by: Rob Oliver
- Written by: Michael Price
- Production code: JABF11
- Original air date: April 29, 2007

Episode features
- Couch gag: The couch is replaced by four wooden chairs. An instrumental version of "Pop Goes the Weasel" plays as the family plays musical chairs. When the music stops, everyone except for Homer grabs a seat. Homer groans in disappointment.
- Commentary: Al Jean; Michael Price; Matt Selman; Tom Gammill; Max Pross; Rob Oliver; Ralph Sosa; Mike B. Anderson

Episode chronology
← Previous "Marge Gamer"	Next → "Crook and Ladder"
- The Simpsons season 18

"The Boys of Bummer" is the eighteenth episode of the eighteenth season of the American animated television series The Simpsons. It originally aired on the Fox network in the United States on April 29, 2007. It was written by Michael Price and was the first episode to be directed by Rob Oliver.

In this episode, Bart becomes a pariah after he costs Springfield a Little League championship while Homer becomes a mattress salesman. The episode received mixed to negative reviews.

== Plot ==
Bart catches a fly ball at a Little League Baseball game, pushing the Springfield Isotopes into the championships. The next day, Marge is shopping at a department store, but Homer is tired and cannot find a place to sit, so he lies down on a mattress and falls asleep. Homer's slumber attracts a crowd, including the store manager. Homer instantly exclaims his love for the mattress and manages to sell five to the Rich Texan, which convinces the store manager to hire Homer as a mattress salesman.

In the championship, Springfield leads Shelbyville 5–2 in the bottom of the ninth with two outs, but Shelbyville has the bases loaded. When their batter hits a pop-up towards Bart, he drops the ball and repeatedly fails to pick it up, letting all four runners score and thus giving Shelbyville the 6–5 victory. The crowd boos Bart and pelts him with beer. Bart's attempt to flee is thwarted by Chief Wiggum, who tricks Bart into his police car and returns to the field so that Bart's ostracization can continue.

Bart, now a social pariah, is reluctant to show himself in public. Lisa tries to cheer him up by taking him to see Joe LaBoot, a baseball player who made the same mistake as Bart did in the 1943 World Series. However, this backfires when LaBoot learns who Bart is and turns on him. Meanwhile, the Lovejoys buy a mattress from Homer to address a sex problem, but bring it to the Simpsons' house the next day with their problem unresolved. As Homer writes them a refund check, they begin making out on his and Marge's mattress, and trade their new mattress for it. When Homer and Marge discover that their new mattress is uncomfortable, they sneak in to the Lovejoys' home to steal back their old mattress. The Lovejoys return and catch Homer and Marge having sex on the mattress. Reverend Lovejoy invokes the Judgment of Solomon and cuts the mattress in half diagonally, giving one half to Homer and Marge. On the way, Homer convinces Marge to drive behind a billboard where they try to have sex as they did on their honeymoon with the same bum watching them.

One morning, Lisa awakes to find someone has spray-painted "I HATE BART SIMPSON" all over the town. She and the rest of the family eventually find Bart, now at the point of self-loathing, spray-painting on the water tower. Encouraged by a mob, Bart jumps off the water tower and lands in a bush. As Bart recovers at the hospital, Marge is upset by the mob chanting "Bart sucks!" outside, and she scolds them for their vindictive behavior. The townspeople, realizing that they have lived up to a billboard's message of Springfield being advertised as the "Meanest City in America," agree to restage the game to restore Bart's self-esteem after Lisa proposes it. Bart regains consciousness in his baseball uniform, and after 78 failed attempts, he finally catches the ball.

60 years later, a 70-year-old Milhouse nearly lets it slip to a 70-year-old Bart that the game was faked, but then claims he was joking when Bart starts crying. The ghosts of Homer and Marge watch and discuss their son, while Homer wants to have sex.

== Production ==
The episode was written by Michael Price. It was his sixth episode. The episode features several cultural references. The "Bart Stinks" song that Jimbo, Dolph, and Kearney sing is a parody of "Love Stinks" by The J. Geils Band, and when Bart notices this he rips down his J. Geils Band posters off his room wall in disappointment. Bart spinning in a circle while his clothes fly off after having been hit by the ball is a reference to Charlie Brown in Peanuts.

== Reception ==
"The Boys of Bummer" originally aired on the Fox network in the United States on April 29, 2007. The episode was watched by 7.57 million viewers.

Adam Finley of TV Squad commented that "In general, I liked this episode. At least, it had a lot more laugh-out-loud moments for me than last week's episode. I don't think the town has turned on Bart so savagely since that time he cut the head off the Jebediah Springfield statue. I thought the absurdity of everyone getting upset over children's sport made it even funnier." He concluded that "I thought perhaps the scene where Bart paints 'I Hate Bart Simpson' all over town might have had more of an emotional weight to it, giving the episode that nice funny/emotional balance that is the stuff of all the best Simpsons episodes, but clearly this episode was meant to be played mostly for laughs."

IGN's Robert Canning was more critical, criticizing the episode for losing heart when "the residents of Springfield are all incredibly cruel to Bart for his error." He added that the plot of the episode sounds "like a typical Simpsons storyline, and one the show is usually capable of pulling off with humor and heart, but the episode simply failed to find the funny in Bart's situation." Canning further wrote that the subplot with Homer was "one of the dullest 'B' storylines The Simpsons have ever had," and "the flash-forward to 60 years in the future only made the episode worse." He concluded: "This entire episode was poorly executed – it lacked all warmth, heart and humor."

Colin Jacobson of DVD Movie Guide said the episode was "a bland show." He thought the main plot with Bart "lacks sizzle" while Homer's subplot started well but "soon fizzles".

On Four Finger Discount, Guy Davis and Brendan Dando liked Homer's subplot but thought Bart's story was "mean and cruel".
