= Moe'N'a Lisa =

- The Simpsons episode
- The episode's promotional image featuring Michael Chabon, Jonathan Franzen, Tom Wolfe and Gore Vidal.
- Episode no.: Season 18; Episode 6
- Directed by: Mark Kirkland
- Written by: Matt Warburton
- Production code: HABF19
- Original air date: November 19, 2006

Guest appearances
- Michael Chabon as himself; Jonathan Franzen as himself; J. K. Simmons as J. Jonah Jameson; Gore Vidal as himself; Tom Wolfe as himself

Episode features
- Couch gag: The family is dragged and dropped onto the couch like in a computer window, but eventually all of them, including the couch, are dropped into the Recycle Bin, which eventually gets emptied.
- Commentary: Al Jean; Matt Selman; Michael Price; Tom Gammill; Max Pross; Mark Kirkland

Episode chronology
← Previous "G.I. (Annoyed Grunt)"	Next → "Ice Cream of Margie (with the Light Blue Hair)"
- The Simpsons season 18

"Moe'N'a Lisa" is the sixth episode of the eighteenth season of the American animated television series The Simpsons. It first aired on the Fox network in the United States on November 19, 2006. Lisa aids Moe in discovering his inner-poet and he gains swift popularity and recognition from a group of successful American authors, when Lisa helps to get his poetry published. However, Lisa is crushed when Moe enjoys his newfound success with famous writers and deliberately refuses to credit Lisa for her assistance in his poetry. It was written by Matt Warburton and directed by Mark Kirkland. J. K. Simmons reprises his role as the voice of J. Jonah Jameson from Sam Raimi's Spider-Man trilogy, while Tom Wolfe, Gore Vidal, Michael Chabon, and Jonathan Franzen make cameos as themselves.

== Plot ==
The Simpson family go to see Grampa perform at the Senior Olympics. After they leave, Moe calls Homer to remind him about a fishing trip to celebrate his birthday. When the family returns, Homer realizes he forgot Moe's birthday when he sees Moe sitting outside on their front steps. That night, Moe writes an angry letter to the family, and the dramatic writing inspires Lisa to choose Moe for her "interesting person" report at school.

At Moe's residence, a run-down hotel, Lisa finds his notes on the wall and arranges them to form a poem. She submits this to American Poetry Perspectives, and the poem is approved, with author Tom Wolfe inviting Moe and the Simpson family to Vermont to attend a literary conference. After Moe sees another poet ridiculed and exiled for admitting he had help with writing, he falsely claims that he wrote and titled his poem all by himself, devastating Lisa.

Moe is featured on a writing panel. Lisa attends and encourages him to share his inspirations, although he insists that he does not have any. However, without Lisa's help, Moe struggles to write a poem in time for a dinner in his honor; when he sees Lisa enter, he improvises a poem about her, thanking her for helping him write poetry. Lisa forgives Moe and they walk out of the dining hall together.

Meanwhile, the publisher of American Poetry Perspectives, J. Jonah Jameson, watches the panel on television and turns it off in disgust. He then demands photos of Spider-Man, but after being reminded that he works at a poetry journal, demands poems about Spider-Man.

== Production ==
The writers of the episode first started with the idea of Moe as Charles Bukowski and then teamed him with Lisa. The episode guest stars authors Tom Wolfe, who says The Simpsons "is the only show of any sort that I watch on television"; Jonathan Franzen and Michael Chabon, who recorded their lines together; and Gore Vidal, who admitted that he was not a regular watcher of the show. In one version of the script, Wolfe, Chabon and Franzen were all killed by a giant boulder. Although the guest stars recorded lines for this part of the episode, the scene was cut from the final version. The Wordloaf conference is based on the real life Bread Loaf Writers' Conference in Vermont.

== Reception ==
=== Viewing figures ===
The episode earned a 3.3 rating and was watched by 9.27 million viewers, which was the 44th most-watched show that week.

=== Critical response ===
Dan Iverson of IGN rates it a 7.3, saying that this episode made up for the previous one. He praises all the guest voices in their appearances, though mainly Tom Wolfe's.

Adam Finley of TV Squad thought the story with Lisa and Moe was somewhat forced but liked seeing Lisa's faith in other people. He also wanted to see more appearance by J. K. Simmons.

Colin Jacobson of DVD Movie Guide felt the plot was a repeat of "Please Homer, Don't Hammer 'Em" from earlier in the season in which a male character gets credit for a female character's work. He also did not like the guest stars apart from Simmons.
