= Yokel Chords =

- The Simpsons episode
- Guest stars (from left) Andy Dick, James Patterson, Meg Ryan (as Dr. Swanson), Stephen Sondheim, and Peter Bogdanovich (as a psychologist)
- Episode no.: Season 18; Episode 14
- Directed by: Susie Dietter
- Written by: Michael Price
- Production code: JABF09
- Original air date: March 4, 2007

Guest appearances
- Peter Bogdanovich as psychologist; Andy Dick as himself; James Patterson as himself; Meg Ryan as Dr. Swanson; Stephen Sondheim as himself; Marcia Wallace as Edna Krabappel

Episode features
- Couch gag: The couch is replaced by a vending machine filled with Simpsons characters. Ralph Wiggum uses it, retrieves a Homer figurine and bites its head off before leaving.
- Commentary: Al Jean; Michael Price; Matt Selman; Tom Gammill and Max Pross; David Silverman

Episode chronology
← Previous "Springfield Up"	Next → "Rome-Old and Juli-Eh"
- The Simpsons season 18

"Yokel Chords" is the fourteenth episode of the eighteenth season of the American animated television series The Simpsons. It originally aired on the Fox network in the United States on March 4, 2007. The episode was written by Michael Price and directed by Susie Dietter.

In this episode, Lisa tutors the Spuckler children while Bart is forced to see a psychiatrist. Meg Ryan and Peter Bogdanovich guest starred. Actor Andy Dick, author James Patterson and composer Stephen Sondheim appeared as themselves. The episode received mixed reviews and won an Annie Award for Outstanding Achievement for Music in an Animated Television/Broadcast Production.

== Plot ==
Marge oversleeps, forcing Homer to make the children's lunch for the day, but he gives Lisa a drawing of a sandwich and gives Bart some of Grampa's medication. Without any food, Bart scares the students with a story about a cannibal cafeteria worker named Dark Stanley. At lunchtime, Bart pretends to be killed by Dark Stanley, leading all the students to run away while he eats their lunches.

Groundskeeper Willie fetches the students and brings back seven other children belonging to Cletus. Principal Skinner tells Superintendent Chalmers that the kids have been refused education in fear that they will lower test averages and cost the school federal funding. Lisa overhears them and threatens to report them to the school newspaper, so to stop her, Chalmers and Skinner appoint Lisa to tutor the Spuckler children. She takes the children to downtown Springfield to introduce them to the culture of the world, but her plans are diverted when Krusty sees the kids singing. He decides to use them as a musical act for his show and offers them a contract, which Cletus signs immediately. Lisa, however, is worried that Krusty and Cletus are exploiting the children, particularly as their constant work leaves them with no time for their studies. Lisa tells Brandine, who is fighting as a soldier in Iraq, who returns to Springfield and confronts Cletus and Krusty. Krusty argues that Cletus signed a contract, but Brandine says only the children who cannot perform well are his. The children thank Lisa for rescuing them, and Cletus and Brandine take them home.

Meanwhile, as punishment for the cafeteria prank, Bart must spend five sessions with psychiatrist Dr. Swanson. Bart is dismissive, so she lets Bart play violent video games while she secretly records his reactions while playing. They develop a bond, which gets Bart to have a breakthrough about Homer's alcoholism and other matters. When his sessions end, Bart becomes sad. A worried Marge uses money she had been saving to get Bart one more session with Swanson. Bart uses the session to realize that he misbehaves so his parents will focus on him instead of fighting with each other. Happy with his mental state, Bart leaves the session early, which makes Swanson sad, so she goes to see her own psychiatrist. It is then revealed that Dark Stanley is in fact real, and had killed Swanson's son.

== Production ==
=== Development ===
After writer Michael Price wrote the episode "My Fair Laddy" the previous season, which was a parody of the musical My Fair Lady, executive producer Al Jean asked Price to consider writing another musical episode. He decided to make a parody of The Sound of Music with Lisa as the Maria character and the Spuckler children as the Von Trapp family.

=== Casting ===
Meg Ryan guest starred as Dr. Swanson. Peter Bogdanovich guest starred as a psychologist. Price directed Bogdanovich for his appearance in this episode. Actor Andy Dick and author James Patterson guest starred as themselves.

Composer Stephen Sondheim also appeared as himself. As Price wrote the episode, he attended a birthday party in which screenwriter John Logan was also in attendance. Logan was working on the film adaptation of Sweeney Todd: The Demon Barber of Fleet Street with Sondheim at the time. Price, a Sondheim fan, asked Logan if Sondheim would be interested in appearing in the episode. He advised Price to directly mail Sondheim a letter, and Sondheim replied with a letter accepting the offer. Price recorded Sondheim's part in New York over two days. Sondheim's lines were recorded on the first day. Because there was no piano in the studio that day, Sondheim returned the following day to perform the required music on the piano.

== Cultural references ==
The scene where Dr. Swanson goes to see a therapist is a reference to the television series The Sopranos, where Dr. Melfi, a therapist herself, is treated by Dr. Elliot Kupferberg. Actor Peter Bogdanovich, who plays Dr. Kupferberg on The Sopranos, is the voice of Dr. Swanson's psychologist in this episode.

The musical number that plays during Bart's telling of 'Dark Stanley' is Suite Punta del Este, a song composed by Argentine composer Astor Piazzolla. The song is also featured in the movie 12 Monkeys.

Lisa takes the Spuckler children to a cultural tour in downtown Springfield. The song that forms the backdrop soundtrack for the tour is "Cultural Things", a parody of "My Favorite Things" from the Rodgers and Hammerstein musical The Sound of Music (Cultural Things also echoes "Portobello Road" from another musical, Bedknobs and Broomsticks. In that sequence, Lisa takes the kids to an art film screening showing Luis Buñuel's Un Chien Andalou. The brief two- second sequence in The Simpsons shows the famous opening scene of the French movie, in which Simone Mareuil's eye is being opened by Buñuel). There are several more references to The Sound of Music throughout the episode.

Bart plays a video game called Death Kill City II: Death City Stories, which is a parody of the Grand Theft Auto video game series.

Bart's story of Dark Stanley is animated in the style of the opening sequence of the television anthology series Mystery! drawn by Edward Gorey.

== Reception ==
=== Viewing figures ===
The episode earned a 3.2 rating and was watched by 9.04 million viewers, which was the 41st most-watched show that week.

=== Critical response ===
Robert Canning of IGN gave the episode a 6.2 out of 10, stating,

This episode of The Simpsons seemed to have a lot going for it. It had many of the ingredients -- lots of guest stars, a storyline loosely based on an existing musical -- that would normally make for a memorable outing, but when it was all over, the whole thing fell short of producing a stellar half-hour. Still, as is often the case with The Simpsons, there were plenty of great laughs, even if the episode as a whole was a bit choppy.

Colin Jacobson of DVD Movie Guide liked the focus on the Spuckler family and the subplot involving Bart.

=== Themes and analysis ===
Commenting on the different depiction of the Spuckler family in this episode, Matthew A. Henry wrote, "Cletus and Brandine are humanized in this episode in ways they have not been previously." The author compared their portrayal by Price, who has degrees from Montclair State University and Tulane University, versus those of the other Simpsons writers who are "products of the Ivy League."

=== Awards and nominations ===
At the 35th Annie Awards, composer Alf Clausen and writer Michael Price won the Annie Award for Outstanding Achievement for Music in an Animated Television/Broadcast Production.
