= The Haw-Hawed Couple =

- The Simpsons episode
- Episode no.: Season 18; Episode 8
- Directed by: Chris Clements
- Written by: Matt Selman
- Production code: JABF02
- Original air date: December 10, 2006

Episode features
- Couch gag: Homer (unseen, but implied to be him) cuts a piece of paper into the shape of him; he pulls it out to reveal the rest of the family holding hands. He then says "Woo-hoo!"
- Commentary: Al Jean; Matt Selman; Michael Price; Tom Gammill; Max Pross; David Silverman

Episode chronology
← Previous "Ice Cream of Margie (with the Light Blue Hair)"	Next → "Kill Gil, Volumes I & II"
- The Simpsons season 18

"The Haw-Hawed Couple" is the eighth episode of the eighteenth season of the American animated television series The Simpsons. It first aired on the Fox network in the United States on December 10, 2006. In the episode, Bart becomes Nelson's new best friend and under Nelson's protection, no one dares to mess with Bart. It was written by Matt Selman and directed by Chris Clements. In its original run, the episode received 8.31 million viewers. It received positive reviews. The episode's title is a pun on The Odd Couple, emphasizing Nelson's style of laughing.

A fictional character featured in this episode, Angelica Button, was later used in the season 19 episode "Smoke on the Daughter", and the revelation that the Angelica Button book series was ghost-written was the basis for the season 23 episode "The Book Job".

== Plot ==
Marge and Homer are making love in their room while playing a fake tape of them arguing, so the kids will not come in. When a flying article of clothing hits the tape recorder and plays America's "A Horse with No Name", Bart and Lisa decide to come in. Bart ends up traumatized by the sight and is an emotional wreck the following day. While he is coping, Nelson coerces Bart and Milhouse for their lunch money, but also invites him and the rest of the class to his upcoming birthday party. Although Bart convinces all his friends not to go to Nelson's birthday party, Marge makes Homer drive Bart to it against his will. After the party, Bart becomes Nelson's new best friend and under Nelson's protection, no one dares to mess with Bart. However, there is only one drawback to his newfound friend/bodyguard: he is no longer able to pal around with Milhouse because Nelson has never had a best friend before and is overly protective and jealous. Eventually, Nelson discovers that Bart had been playing with Milhouse, which leads him to no longer consider Bart a friend. He eventually decides to forgive Bart, however Bart tells Nelson that he thinks he is a psycho. Later, during a field trip to some tide pools, Nelson confronts Bart in a cave, telling Bart he is a bad friend. Suddenly, high tide comes and Nelson saves Bart (but only because they were field trip buddies). Later, Bart goes home and remembers the good times he had with Nelson while hugging a "Nelson vest" he had received.

Meanwhile, in the B-plot, Homer finds himself hooked on one of Lisa's fantasy books, choosing to read an Angelica Button book to Lisa. Homer eventually reads ahead and finds that one of the characters, Greystash, is killed while trying to save Angelica. Upon hearing that Greystash dying would be the end of Lisa's childhood, Homer is unable to bring himself to read the actual last chapter to Lisa, and improvises a happy ending instead involving Greystash defeating the evil wizard. Afterward, Lisa reads the real ending and nonchalantly decides that Homer's ending was better. During the credits, Homer is seen at Moe's Tavern, still mourning the loss of Greystash while screaming, "No man should have to outlive his fictional wizard!".

== Cultural references ==
The Angelica Button series of books are a parody of the Harry Potter franchise. Greystash is a parody of Albus Dumbledore. The Malicious Krubb is a parody of both Lucius Malfoy and Severus Snape due to his resemblance to the former's looks, and the fact that he killed the Dumbledore-esque figure, like the latter. The character Lord Evilton is a parody of Lord Voldemort.

The continuous shot of Bart and Nelson walking through the back of the school to get to the lunch hall is a nearly perfect shot-by-shot rendition of the Steadicam scene from Goodfellas, as Henry and Karen walk through the back of the Copacabana, with Bart echoing Ray Liotta's voiceover narration. The song played in this scene is "He's a Rebel" by The Crystals. The same band's song "And Then He Kissed Me" was used during the Steadicam shot in Goodfellas. The ending sequence with Bart embracing his vest closely resembles the final scene of Brokeback Mountain.

== Reception ==
=== Viewing figures ===
The episode earned a 2.9 rating and was watched by 8.31 million viewers, which was the 44th most-watched show that week.

=== Critical response ===
Dan Iverson of IGN gave the episode a 7.9 out of 10. He like the Harry Potter parody showing Homer's love for Lisa and the social commentary of using the word "bully" in the wake the Michael Richards incident.

Adam Finley of TV Squad said the episode was a "decent episode ... though not spectacular." He liked seeing Homer protect Lisa from the book's ending and noted the complexity of the character of Nelson.

Colin Jacobson of DVD Movie Guide was surprised there was not an episode of Bart and Nelson becoming friends until now. He liked the pairing and the Goodfellas parody.

=== Awards and nominations ===
This episode was subsequently nominated for a Primetime Emmy Award in 2007 for Outstanding Animated Program (Less Than One Hour) but lost to South Park.

Matt Selman was also nominated for the Writers Guild of America Award for Television: Animation at the 60th Writers Guild of America Awards; the award was won by The Simpsons episode "Kill Gil, Volumes I & II".
