= Marge Gamer =

- The Simpsons episode
- Homer showing Ronaldo a red card (in some promotional images, Ronaldo appears with a Real Madrid uniform, rather than the Brazil national soccer team one).
- Episode no.: Season 18; Episode 17
- Directed by: Bob Anderson
- Written by: J. Stewart Burns
- Production code: JABF10
- Original air date: April 22, 2007

Guest appearances
- Ronaldo as himself (credited as Ronaldo Luis Nazário de Lima); Marcia Wallace as Edna Krabappel

Episode features
- Couch gag: A copy of The Springfield Shopper spins into frame. The headline reads, “COUCH GAG THRILLS NATION” with a photo of the Simpsons on the couch
- Commentary: Al Jean; J. Stewart Burns; Matt Selman; Joel H. Cohen; Jeff Westbrook; Tom Gammill; Max Pross; Yeardley Smith

Episode chronology
← Previous "Homerazzi"	Next → "The Boys of Bummer"
- The Simpsons season 18

"Marge Gamer" is the seventeenth episode of the eighteenth season of the American animated television series The Simpsons. It originally aired on the Fox network in the United States on April 22, 2007. The episode was written by J. Stewart Burns and directed by Bob Anderson.

In this episode, Marge joins Bart in playing an online role-playing game while Homer becomes a referee for Lisa's soccer games. It featured a guest appearance from Brazilian soccer player Ronaldo. The episode received negative reviews.

== Plot ==
Marge is embarrassed at a Parent-Teacher Association meeting because she does not have an email address. She agrees to get one and learns to browse the internet. Bored with no new email, she repeatedly hits the refresh button causing new advertising banners to appear. An advertisement for a massively multiplayer online role-playing game called Earthland Realms catches her attention. Marge clicks on it and creates a character for the game. She quickly learns how to play, exploring the local town when she meets the characters of other Springfield residents who are also playing the game. Soon, she is dragged into hiding with everyone else as a powerful and deadly character named "The Shadow Knight" appears. He kills Principal Skinner's character, a sentient reptilian turkey, before Apu begins eating the roasted remains. Disgusted, Marge stops playing. Walking past Bart's bedroom, she discovers that Bart is the Shadow Knight, yet is pleased about how well he is doing in the game.

With this knowledge, Marge goes to the Shadow Knight's castle and meets Bart, fussing over and embarrassing him. Later, when Marge runs into Jimbo, Dolph and Kearney while exploring, Bart rescues her. Returning to his castle with her, Bart discovers that Marge replaced the contents of his trophy room with a Hello Kitty expansion pack. Enraged, Bart smashes the decorations and accidentally kills Marge's character in the process, massively disappointing her, and causing her to act coldly to him. Meanwhile, Homer takes Lisa to her soccer game and agrees to referee the match. His subpar skills frustrate Lisa, so Homer learns the rules of soccer and becomes a better referee. While playing, Lisa trips trying to steal the ball from another player. Homer calls a foul and gives the ball to Lisa. She takes advantage of the situation and pretends to be fouled again so Homer can grant her another penalty kick. When Homer's decision is challenged, Ronaldo appears and confirms that Lisa is a flopper. Homer gives Lisa a yellow card. Angered, Lisa rips up the yellow card, causing Homer to give her a red card and eject her from the game.

Homer returns home with an angry Lisa from the soccer game. Homer and Bart go to Moe's Tavern where Moe gives them advice. Homer gives Lisa a DVD documentary about soccer riots and player fights, which horrifies her. Lisa realizes she was at fault and apologizes to Homer. Meanwhile, Bart uses his character's abilities to transfer health to his mother's character, costing him two-thirds of his life force. Having heard that he is weakened, the other players storm his castle and graphically kill the Shadow Knight, celebrating by propping his limbless body upright and dancing around it like a maypole, using his innards as ribbons. Rather than continuing, Bart instead opts to go outside and play soccer with the rest of his family, barring Marge, who changes her character to a warrior and avenges her son by eliminating all those who participated in killing him, starting with Moe's character, who wonders why he's paying $14.95 a month to play the game.

== Production ==
Brazilian soccer player Ronaldo appeared as himself.

== Cultural references ==
The game Earthland Realms is a parody of 2000s massively multiplayer online role-playing games, combining elements of EverQuest and World of Warcraft. Apu cheers for the parent characters while watching the 2002 film Bend It Like Beckham.

== Reception ==
=== Viewing figures ===
The episode earned a 2.3 rating and was watched by 6.46 million viewers, which was the 53rd most-watched show that week.

=== Critical response ===
Adam Finley of TV Squad felt "the Homer/Lisa story might have worked better as the main plot, but even that segment of the episode was hindered by a terrible guest voice in soccer player Ronaldo". He also said, "I hate it when non-actors do guest voices on The Simpsons" and "bad voice acting becomes much more of a distraction".

Robert Canning of IGN gave the episode a 4.5 of out 10. He thought the episode contained a random sequence of events with an unrelated subplot that did not begin until the second act. He was also bothered that the video game animation style did not differ from the normal animation.

Colin Jacobson of DVD Movie Guide thought the story of Marge using the internet was "clever" but the role-playing game parody was "gimmicky".

In 2007, Simon Crerar of The Times listed Ronaldo's performance as one of the thirty-three funniest cameos in the history of the show.
