= Treehouse of Horror XVII =

- The Simpsons episode
- The episode's promotional image, featuring all three segments.
- Episode no.: Season 18; Episode 4
- Directed by: David Silverman; Matthew Faughnan
- Written by: Peter Gaffney
- Production code: HABF17
- Original air date: November 5, 2006

Guest appearances
- Fran Drescher as Female Golem; Richard Lewis as Male Golem; Maurice LaMarche as Orson Welles; Dr. Phil McGraw as himself; Sir Mix-a-Lot sings "Baby Likes Fat"; Marcia Wallace as Edna Krabappel

Episode features
- Commentary: Al Jean; J. Stewart Burns; Michael Price; Tom Gammill; Max Pross; David Silverman; Yeardley Smith

Episode chronology
← Previous "Please Homer, Don't Hammer 'Em"	Next → "G.I. (Annoyed Grunt)"
- The Simpsons season 18

"Treehouse of Horror XVII" is the fourth episode of the eighteenth season of the American animated television series The Simpsons, and the seventeenth Treehouse of Horror episode. It originally aired on the Fox network in the United States on November 5, 2006. In "Married to the Blob", Homer eats green extraterrestrial slime and morphs into a rampaging blob with an insatiable appetite; in "You Gotta Know When to Golem", Bart uses Krusty's golem to wreak havoc on his tormentors; and in "The Day the Earth Looked Stupid", the residents of a late-1930s Springfield refuse to believe news of an actual alien invasion after being duped by Orson Welles's The War of the Worlds radio broadcast.

It was written by Peter Gaffney and directed by David Silverman and Matthew C. Faughnan. Dr. Phil McGraw and Sir Mix-a-Lot guest star as themselves, Richard Lewis and Fran Drescher guest voice as the male and female Golems, respectively. In its original run, the episode received 10.43 million viewers.

== Plot ==
In a dungeon, a crypt opens, revealing a coffin containing Mr. Burns as the Crypt Keeper. Moe interrupts him as he introduces himself, and is consequently killed in an iron maiden, his blood spilling onto the floor and spelling out the title of the episode.

=== Married to the Blob ===
In a parody of The Blob, While Homer and Marge kiss in the backyard, a meteorite falls nearby, cracking open to reveal a green substance. Homer, despite his family's objections, devours it. Later that night, he experiences intense hunger, and Homer eats all the food present in the house. He also eats Snowball V before attempting to eat Bart, but is stopped by Marge. Over time, Homer gradually mutates into a giant blob monster, rampaging through Springfield and eating all the townspeople he can find. Eventually, Dr. Phil McGraw shows up with the Simpson family and tells Homer to stop for their sakes. In fear of losing Marge, Homer ends his rampage after he consumes McGraw and vows to use his insatiable appetite for more constructive purposes. Later, Mayor Quimby establishes a new homeless shelter, but the homeless people are quickly devoured by Homer upon entering.

=== You Gotta Know When to Golem ===
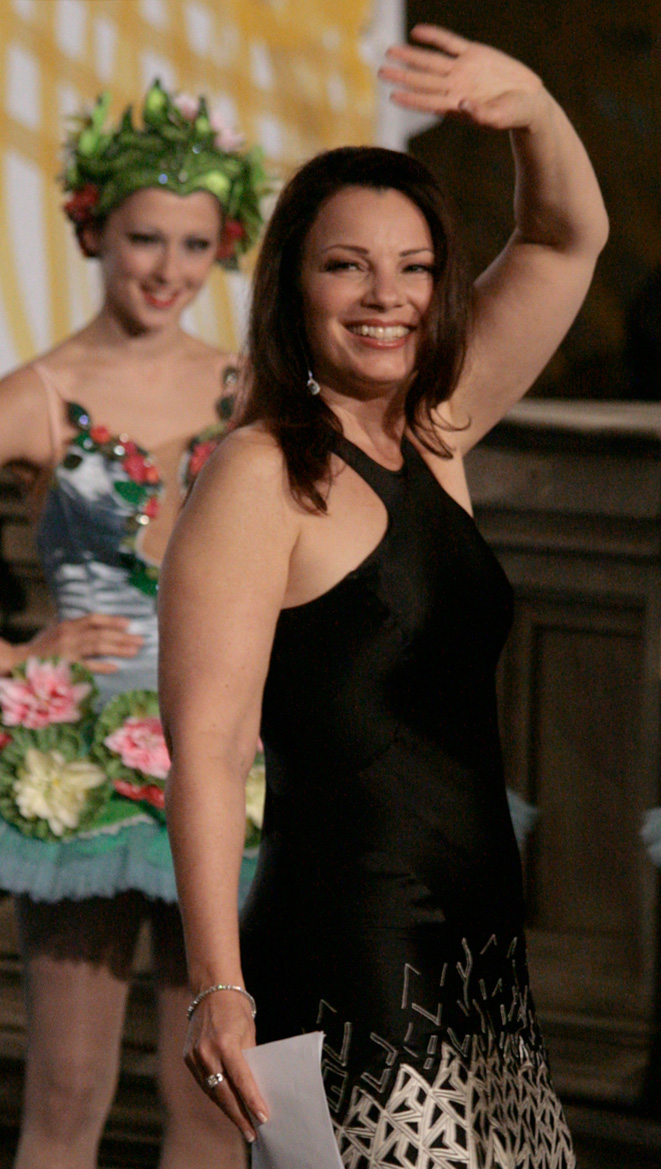
Fran Drescher guest stars as the female Golem

At the end of an episode of Krusty's show, Bart goes backstage to complain about an alarm clock he bought, and finds the Golem of Prague, a creature from Jewish mythology designed to protect Jewish people. Krusty tells Bart that in the 17th century, the Golem was sculpted out of clay by a rabbi and would obey any command written on a scroll and placed in his mouth, regardless of intent. Bart then steals the Golem by writing a command for him to come to his home at midnight, and he uses him to carry out several commands, including swinging Principal Skinner up and down like a yo-yo until he splits in half. Lisa thinks the Golem does not like doing the bidding of others and orders him to speak; the Golem reveals that he feels guilty about being forced to commit heinous acts through the years. To help him feel better, the Simpsons create a female Golem out of Play-Doh, and the two are married by Rabbi Hyman Krustofsky. Meanwhile, the female Golem convinces Chief Wiggum not to press charges for Skinner's murder with the promise of pan-fried latkes.

=== The Day the Earth Looked Stupid ===
Springfield is fooled by Orson Welles' 1938 The War of the Worlds radio broadcast, leading to mass panic. Marge believes that the Martians will only destroy humans, and suggests that they pretend to be animals to fool the aliens, with Sideshow Mel encouraging his fellow townspeople to cavort naked in the mud to support the ruse. They do this until the following day, when Lisa tells the citizens that it was all a hoax. Meanwhile, Kang and Kodos, observing the entire event from their spaceship, decide this is the perfect time for a real invasion, and begin destroying what is left of the town. The town does not believe that it is a real invasion and ignores it, even as Orson Welles comes to Springfield and admits it is not a staged act. Three years later, Kang and Kodos look over the ruins of Springfield and contemplate on why they were not greeted as liberators, while the camera pulls away from the ruins of Springfield as "I Don't Want to Set the World on Fire" by The Ink Spots plays.

== Production ==
"The Day the Earth Looked Stupid" was originally supposed to end with Kang and Kodos making a direct reference to the Iraq War as they observe the ruined remains of 1938 Springfield. While the Fox censors had no objections over the line, the producers and writers felt the reference was too obvious and had it cut to make the joke more subtle.

Once again Maurice LaMarche voiced Orson Welles, doing his impression of Welles used earlier for The Brain on Animaniacs and Pinky and the Brain.

At the end of the episode Al Jean is credited as "Al July 27, 2007 Jean" predicting the release date for the then in production and upcoming Simpsons Movie.

== Reception ==
"Treehouse of Horror XVII" received mixed to positive reviews from television critics. The episode was declared by Matt Zoller Seitz of New York magazine as being one of nine later Simpsons episodes that was as good as the show's classic era.

Dan Iverson of IGN gave the episode a score of 7.6/10, commenting "...The dialogue was really quite good - even if the stories weren't the best (and in comparison, they were better than the past four years of Treehouse episodes)... And in typical Simpsons fashion the celebrity appearances were hysterical", concluding "We can totally overlook any other issues the episode had and recommend the episode to anybody who likes random comedy".

In the article 'You said we'd be greeted as liberators!': 10 anxiety-reflecting Simpsons Halloween segments, The A.V. Club singled out The Day The Earth Looked Stupid, noting that while "the show was awfully quiet during the darkest days of the Bush presidency—which is even more surprising how blatantly left it had been in the past...the show nearly made up for it with its most political—and bleakest—Treehouse segment ever", concluding "The Day The Earth Looked Stupid was The Simpsons at its most pointed".

When listing the 66 segments of the first 22 Treehouse of Horror episodes in order from worst to best, Joshua Kurp of Splitsider gave this episode's segments (in order of appearance) rankings of #52, #47, and #59. He "saw this episode screened at an event where Matt Groening was present". Kurp said "Blob" was done better in "King-Size Homer", Richard Lewis did not have enough screen time in "Golem", and "Day"'s "conclusion bombed".
