= Crook and Ladder =

- The Simpsons episode
- Episode no.: Season 18; Episode 19
- Directed by: Lance Kramer
- Written by: Bill Odenkirk
- Production code: JABF13
- Original air date: May 6, 2007

Episode features
- Chalkboard gag: "I will not look up what teacher makes"
- Couch gag: The TV moves aside as the Simpsons are put through a car wash, where they get sprayed with water, blasted with hot wax, and scrubbed with prickly brushes. In the end, Marge's hair is puffy, the family looks miserable, and Maggie's pacifier is gone. Three men come in, wipe the family down with rags, and give Maggie a new pacifier.
- Commentary: Al Jean; Bill Odenkirk; Tim Long; Kevin Curran; Tom Gammill; David Silverman; Dan Castellaneta; Lance Kramer

Episode chronology
← Previous "The Boys of Bummer"	Next → "Stop, or My Dog Will Shoot!"
- The Simpsons season 18

"Crook and Ladder" is the nineteenth episode of the eighteenth season of the American animated television series The Simpsons. It originally aired on the Fox network in the United States on May 6, 2007. The episode was written by Bill Odenkirk and directed by Lance Kramer.

In this episode, Homer joins a group of volunteer firefighters who steal items from the homes they save. The episode received positive reviews.

== Plot ==
Marge, following the advice of a parenting magazine, takes away Maggie's pacifier. Angered, Maggie destroys the inside of the Simpson home. Marge explains to Maggie that it is for her own good until Lisa reveals the magazine is by Larry Flynt Publications. The family runs out of spare pacifiers, so Marge sends Homer to buy a new one, but he cannot find the right brand, making Maggie cry incessantly. Luckily, Santa's Little Helper gives Maggie his squeaky toy, which calms her, but also makes Homer unable to sleep. He begins using the sleeping drug Nappien, which causes him to unintentionally sleepwalk.

Taking advantage of this situation, one night, Bart and Milhouse have Homer drive them around town. When Homer abruptly wakes up, he crashes into the fire department house, injuring all the firemen. As they recuperate at a hospital, Homer, Apu, Moe, and Principal Skinner become volunteer firefighters. Mayor Quimby refuses to train them beyond a standard textbook, but the new team is quite efficient. After the first few fires, despite being initially against it, they are rewarded for their efforts.

This practice soon spoils the men, and when they save Mr. Burns' house and receive no reward, they feel cheated and steal some of his abundant treasures, claiming they were destroyed by the fire. From then on, they (except Skinner who wants no involvement with it) take items from the places they save and no one doubts their lie. However, Marge and the kids soon catch Homer in the act, and Marge gets the kids to make sad faces around him everywhere he goes. Annoyed by this gesture, he decides to stop and convince the others to stop too after saving Moe's and Apu's lives. They then give their loot to the homeless.

== Cultural references ==
The sleep medicine "Nappien" parodies the sleeping medicine Ambien. Music similar to the score of the 1994 film Forrest Gump plays when Mr. Burns floats like the feather. When Bart discovers that Homer arranges the VHS tapes like dominoes, the cover of the 1984 film C.H.U.D. is briefly seen.

== Reception ==
=== Viewing figures ===
The episode earned a 2.7 rating and was watched by 7.77 million viewers, which was the 45th most-watched show of the week.

=== Critical response ===
Robert Canning of IGN gave the episode a "Great" rating of 8 out of 10. He said the "delightful" show was a return to form, and praised its "great pacing, fun character interactions and laugh-out-loud moments". He noted that "the story was told with several fantastic, almost stream-of-consciousness segues that smartly linked comedic segment to comedic segment", resulting in the removal of "unnecessary and unfunny filler" - a problem that often "plagued recent episodes". He said that Marge hadn't been the focus of many episodes at that time, so her importance to this episode was a welcome development. He concluded his review by saying "This was a fun, well-crafted episode that had plenty of great laughs...It's been a while since a single episode could offer up such a list of memorable moments. 'Crook and Ladder' might just be one of those Simpsons episodes that never gets old."

Adam Finley of TV Squad said the episode was "one of the funniest episodes I had seen in a long time" and rated it a 6 out of 7. However, he thought the humor distracted from the emotional arc of the episode.

Colin Jacobson of DVD Movie Guide said the episode had a "thin premise", but the jokes made it a "positive program."

On Four Finger Discount, Guy Davis and Brendan Dando wanted the episode to have a more "fleshed out idea." They thought that too much time was wasted before Homer becomes a firefighter and that the kids should have seen Homer stealing sooner to have more time dealing with the conflict.

=== Awards and nominations ===
In 2008, the episode won the Prism Award, which honors films and television shows for accurate depictions of mental health and substance abuse issues, for Best Comedy Series Episode.
