= The Wife Aquatic =

- The Simpsons episode
- Episode no.: Season 18; Episode 10
- Directed by: Lance Kramer
- Written by: Kevin Curran
- Production code: JABF03
- Original air date: January 7, 2007

Guest appearances
- Maurice LaMarche as Billy & Oceanographer; Sab Shimono as Gruff Japanese sailor

Episode features
- Couch gag: The couch and the Simpsons are pinned onto a bulletin board.
- Commentary: Al Jean; Kevin Curran; Tim Long; Bill Odenkirk; Tom Gammill; David Silverman; Dan Castellaneta; Lance Kramer

Episode chronology
← Previous "Kill Gil, Volumes I & II"	Next → "Revenge Is a Dish Best Served Three Times"
- The Simpsons season 18

"The Wife Aquatic" is the tenth episode of the eighteenth season of the American animated television series The Simpsons. It originally aired on the Fox network in the United States on January 7, 2007. The episode was written by Kevin Curran and directed by Lance Kramer.

In this episode, Homer surprises Marge with a family trip to Barnacle Bay, where her family went each summer when she was a child, but discover that the town is in decline. Sab Shimono guest starred. The episode received mixed reviews.

== Plot ==
The residents of Springfield watch a silent film at an outdoor movie night. When the film is destroyed and the people demand another film, Patty and Selma show an old home movie from Marge's youth of a Bouvier trip to the town of Barnacle Bay, located on an island in New England. Noticing Marge seeing how happy she was in the movie, Homer organizes a surprise trip there with the family. However, upon the family's arrival, they see that town of Barnacle Bay has deteriorated.

They learn that the town has been in decline since the Yum Yum Fish disappeared, which Lisa suggests was due to overfishing. Not wanting to see Marge sad, Homer organizes the townsfolk to renovate the carousel on the pier. Homer invites Marge to ride the carousel, and he conducts a fireworks display. However, the display's finale causes a fire that destroys the pier and carousel. The townsfolk capture Homer and force him to catch fish to repay them. Homer is placed with a fishing crew, which sets out to catch Yum Yum Fish. At night, Homer mistakenly batters and deep fries the fishing hooks and serves the crew fishing bait. The captain goes to check the fishing hooks and finds that they have attracted a large haul of Yum Yum Fish. Meanwhile, Marge and Lisa learn that a perfect storm is approaching Barnacle Bay. At sea, the crew sees the storm approaching, but the captain refuses to leave while there are more Yum Yum Fish to be caught until it is too late.

The crew discovers that Bart has stowed away on the ship to avoid activities with Marge and Lisa. Although the captain tries to steer the ship through the storm, it is destroyed. The remaining Simpson family members and the Barnacle Bay townsfolk believe all hands have been lost at sea and attend a memorial service for them. However, Homer, Bart, and the crew interrupt the service, and Homer explains that they were rescued when they were caught in the net from a Japanese fishing boat. The captain invites the townsfolk to catch more Yum Yum Fish, but Lisa warns them about the dangers of overfishing and how it brought their town to financial ruin. Agreeing with her, the townsfolk decide to join the logging industry, cutting down the island's trees to be used for pornographic magazines, despite Lisa's protests.

== Production ==
Sab Shimono guest starred. Shimono previously appeared as different characters in the second season episode "One Fish, Two Fish, Blowfish, Blue Fish" and the eighth season episode "In Marge We Trust".

The name of the Japanese fishing boat that rescues Homer and the crew is named いるか ころし 丸 or Iruka Koroshi Maru, which translates to Dolphin Murder.

== Cultural references ==
The part of the episode where the ship is caught in a storm is a parody of the 2000 film The Perfect Storm. "Aquarium", the seventh movement of Camille Saint-Saëns's The Carnival of the Animals, is played repeatedly throughout the episode.

== Reception ==
=== Viewing figures ===
The episode earned a 4.1 rating and was watched by 11.62 million viewers, which was the 23rd most-watched show that week.

=== Critical response ===
Dan Iverson of IGN gave the episode a 7.8 out of 10. Although he thought the episode was a better one from this era, he felt the Perfect Storm parody was dated and thought the environmental message was not fully formed.

On Four Finger Discount, Guy Davis and Brendan Dando felt sympathy for Homer because the destructive incident was not his fault and because he was sincere in his intention. They thought this contrasted with his behavior in other similar episodes from this era. They were also not sure what the intended environmental message was supposed to be.

Nick Steinberg of Screen Rant said that the "post-golden age run has produced few episodes as moving as and heartfelt as" this episode.

=== Awards and nominations ===
At the 17th Environmental Media Awards, this episode was nominated for Television Episodic Comedy.
