= Rome-Old and Juli-Eh =

- The Simpsons episode
- Episode no.: Season 18; Episode 15
- Directed by: Nancy Kruse
- Written by: Daniel Chun
- Production code: JABF08
- Original air date: March 11, 2007

Guest appearances
- Jane Kaczmarek as Judge Constance Harm

Episode features
- Couch gag: In a parody of the Bonanza opening, a map of frontier-era United States is burned out in the center, revealing the Simpsons on horseback as they gallop away.
- Commentary: Al Jean; Tim Long; Tom Gammill; Max Pross; Hank Azaria; Mike B. Anderson

Episode chronology
← Previous "Yokel Chords"	Next → "Homerazzi"
- The Simpsons season 18

"Rome-Old and Juli-Eh" is the fifteenth episode of the eighteenth season of the American animated television series The Simpsons. It originally aired on the Fox network in the United States on March 11, 2007. The episode was written by Daniel Chun and directed by Nancy Kruse.

In this episode, Grampa starts a romantic relationship with Selma while Bart and Lisa build a fort with cardboard boxes. Jane Kaczmarek guest starred as her recurring character, Judge Constance Harm. The episode received mixed reviews.

== Plot ==
Homer surprises the family with a newly decorated basement, now a recreation room, prompting Marge to ask how he could afford all this. He tells Marge he has a plan, and he files for bankruptcy because he believes that this will save him from paying his debts. Unfortunately, Judge Constance Harm tells him that the bankruptcy laws have changed, and, under the new laws, he must pay everything back. Looking through the family's expenses, Homer decides to save money by moving Grampa out of the retirement home and having him live with the family. Grampa turns the recreation room into his bedroom. Without the recreation room, Bart and Lisa decide to order complimentary cardboard delivery boxes to build a fort after seeing Ned order some boxes. When the box deliveryman sees what Bart and Lisa did with the boxes, he demands they return them, and he threatens them when they refuse. An army of deliverymen arrive to battle Bart and Lisa at their fort. As they scale the fort, Nelson comes to the rescue of Bart and Lisa. They fend off the army but decide to melt the fort with water from a hose when they get bored with it.

One night, Homer and Marge go out and ask Grampa to babysit Bart and Lisa. Not trusting Grampa's competence, Marge also asks her sister Selma to watch Grampa and the kids. During the evening, Grampa and Selma bond and end up kissing as Homer and Marge arrive home. Marge is happy with Grampa and Selma's decision to date, but a disgusted Homer and Patty team up to break them up. At the mall, Patty, disguised as Selma, kisses a disguised Homer as Grampa passes them. Grampa is saddened until the real Selma appears and exposes them.

Angry at being manipulated, Grampa proposes to Selma and she accepts. They get married and move in together. With Grampa unable to work, Selma works as a manager at the DMV while he stays home and takes care of her daughter Ling. One day, Grampa gets confused while using the kitchen appliances and causes a fire. This makes Selma realize their relationship cannot last just with love, but as she laments that she will be alone forever, Grampa assures her she will find someone she can depend on, and they dance together one last time.

== Production ==
Jane Kaczmarek reprised her role as Judge Constance Harm. Kaczmarek first voiced this role in the thirteenth season episode "The Parent Rap".

== Cultural references ==
To save gas, Homer says he is "Flintstone-ing" the car, a reference of how characters from the animated television series The Flintstones start their cars. The battle sequence with Bart, Lisa, and the box deliverymen is a parody of the battles from The Lord of the Rings film series, at the same time utilizing the music from The Return of the King.

== Reception ==
=== Viewing figures ===
The episode earned a 3.1 rating and was watched by 8.79 million viewers on its first broadcast on Fox, which was the 33rd most-watched show that week.

=== Critical response ===
Robert Canning of IGN gave the episode a 6 out of 10, concluding,

Again, this was an episode that had a handful of funny bits, but none of it came together to tell a solid, original story. And that's one of the major downfalls that's been hurting the show of late -- running out of stories to tell. This isn't too surprising after 18 seasons, but you'd think they would have been able to come up with something better than another Selma marriage that you already knew was going to fail.

Adam Finley of AOL TV wrote, "[t]his episode had some good laughs, but overall I wasn't too impressed."

On Four Finger Discount, Guy Davis and Brendan Dando thought the episode was "weird". They did not find the episode believable, and they knew the relationship between Grampa and Selma would not last.
