= You Kent Always Say What You Want =

- The Simpsons episode
- Episode no.: Season 18; Episode 22
- Directed by: Matthew Nastuk
- Written by: Tim Long
- Production code: JABF15
- Original air date: May 20, 2007

Guest appearances
- Ludacris as himself; Maurice LaMarche as Fox narrator

Episode features
- Commentary: Al Jean; Tim Long; Matt Selman; Tom Gammill; Max Pross; Hank Azaria; Mike B. Anderson

Episode chronology
← Previous "24 Minutes"	Next → "He Loves to Fly and He D'ohs"
- The Simpsons season 18

"You Kent Always Say What You Want" is the twenty-second and final episode of the eighteenth season of the American animated television series The Simpsons. It originally aired on the Fox network in the United States on May 20, 2007, as part of the one-hour season finale, alongside the episode "24 Minutes". It was the milestone 400th episode of The Simpsons and was written by Tim Long and directed by Matthew Nastuk.

In this episode, Kent Brockman is fired for swearing on air and moves in to the Simpson home where he and Lisa investigate the Republican Party. The episode guest starred Ludacris as himself and Maurice LaMarche as the Fox announcer. It received positive reviews.

It was the last episode to air prior to The Simpsons Movie, which was released two months later on July 27, 2007.

== Special opening ==
In celebration of the 20th anniversary of the show (when counting the shorts), the entire opening sequence is replaced with a black screen that reads, "20 Years Ago..." followed by a showing of The Tracey Ullman Show Simpsons short "Family Portrait", which involves Homer failing the shot on multiple occasions.

== Plot ==
After a trip to the dentist, Homer takes the Simpson family to an ice cream parlor, where he buys the store's millionth ice cream cone. This sees him appear on Kent Brockman's TV news talk show Smartline on Channel 6, since both have the same owner. Kent is annoyed that he is forced to do a fluff piece instead of an in-depth, intellectually stimulating discussion of the conflict in the Middle East. During the interview, Homer accidentally knocks coffee into Kent's lap, making him swear in pain.

After the commercial break, Kent apologizes, but is relieved to find that, as the Internet has supplanted television as a source of news information, no one saw his on-air faux pas. However, Ned Flanders reviews the incident and gets people of alike minds to report it to the Federal Communications Commission. The next day Kent finds out that he is under scrutiny for his indiscretion and that the station has been fined $10 million. He is demoted to weekend weatherman with his rival, Arnie Pye, as the new anchorman. With all of Channel 6 now under financial strain because of the fine, Lindsey Naegle fires Kent on the pretence that he has put cocaine in his coffee, despite Kent assuring her it is actually Splenda.

Fearing for Kent's wellbeing, Marge invites him to stay at the Simpson house. While watching TV the next day, Lisa wonders why the cable channel Fox News can be so conservative while the Fox Network broadcasts sexualized content. Kent replies that Fox deliberately airs programs with morally reprehensible content so that they will be fined by the FCC, with the fines being funneled to the Republican Party, something which everyone in the entertainment business is aware of. Lisa goads Kent into blowing the whistle on this scam and uploads the revelations to YouTube.

Kent's subsequent webcast is so successful that Springfield's Republican Party members become worried it will affect them financially. The next day, Lindsey Naegle and the party members offer Kent his job back with a fifty percent raise, which he accepts immediately, apologizing to Lisa. Lisa complains to Homer of people in the media have no bravery or integrity; Homer consoles her by telling a horrifying secret that Kent told him about the Fox network, only for all references to the secret to be redacted with an announcer praising the network's programming. Homer then tries to tell the secret to the show's audience, only to be cut off by the 20th Century Fox Television logo. He then tries again only to be cut off by the Gracie Films logo.

== Cultural references ==
- The title references the Rolling Stones' song "You Can't Always Get What You Want", as well as the 1970 Kent State massacre (the original title for this episode was supposed to be "The Kent State Massacre," but following the Virginia Tech shooting, the title had to be changed).
- The song played when Kent is fired is the theme from Midnight Cowboy by John Barry.
- Homer makes implicit references to the Terri Schiavo case and the hot-button issues of immigration and homosexuality.
- The scene where Kent says to stand up to Fox while smoking is in reference to Edward R. Murrow and the film Good Night, and Good Luck.
- The title of the video shown in the dentist's office, "Menace Tooth Society", is a spoof of Menace II Society. Lisa's comment that the dentist's cartoon sends mixed messages parallels critiques of the spoofed movie.
- As Marge runs hurriedly home to greet Bart and Lisa, the main yodeling music (Way Out There by Carter Burwell) of the Coen Brothers' film Raising Arizona is heard, and parts of the scene parody the same scene (Hans Moleman almost hitting them head-on, being shot at by Snake Jaibird, etc.)
- One of Kent Brockman's career highlights was his interview with the Star Wars character R4-D4.

== Production ==
This episode, formerly known as "The Kent State Massacre", was renamed in light of the Virginia Tech massacre, which occurred only a month before the episode was set to air. The episode was intended to spoof increased fines by the Federal Communications Commission in the wake of the Janet Jackson wardrobe malfunction. However, a month before the episode aired, Don Imus was suspended and subsequently fired for remarks he made on the air about the Rutgers University women's basketball team, through events closely paralleling the events of this episode.

== Release ==
The episode aired at 8:30 PM ET/PT immediately following the previous episode as part of a one-hour season finale.

== Reception ==
=== Viewing figures ===
The show was viewed by 9.80 million viewers.

=== Critical response ===
Robert Canning of IGN named the episode one of his three favorites of the season, stating that it "ended the season on a very high note". Canning also gave it a score of 9.3 out of 10 and called it "an episode full of highlights", adding, "This was a fantastic way to both end the year and celebrate the 400th episode milestone. The well-balanced finale reminded us how wonderfully the show can handle biting satire while remaining true to the family situation comedy at its core. If every future episode could be guaranteed to remain this smart and funny, we wouldn't have a problem with the show staying on the air for another 18 seasons."

Adam Finley of TV Squad liked that this episode was the 400th episode because it had less fanfare than the previous episode. He did not like episode template at the time of having one plot diverting to another plot but liked the dentist sequence.

Colin Jacobson of DVD Movie Guide said the episode repeated the plot of having a character stay with the Simpsons but liked seeing Krusty voice Itchy and Scratchy and thought the episode "largely finishes the season well."
