= Little Big Girl =

- The Simpsons episode
- Promotional artwork for the episode, featuring Bart and Darcy.
- Episode no.: Season 18; Episode 12
- Directed by: Raymond S. Persi
- Written by: Don Payne
- Production code: JABF04
- Original air date: February 11, 2007

Guest appearance
- Natalie Portman as Darcy

Episode features
- Chalkboard gag: "So long suckers" (during the episode)
- Couch gag: The Simpsons are stand-up paper dolls in their underwear; a pair of hands puts clothes on them, after which they smile and sit on the couch.
- Commentary: Al Jean; Matt Selman; John Frink; Tom Gammill; Max Pross; David Silverman; Nancy Cartwright; Raymond Persi

Episode chronology
| ← Previous "Revenge Is a Dish Best Served Three Times" | Next → "Springfield Up" |
- The Simpsons season 18

"Little Big Girl" is the twelfth episode of the eighteenth season of the American animated television series The Simpsons. It originally aired on the Fox network in the United States on February 11, 2007. The episode was written by Don Payne and directed by Raymond S. Persi.

In this episode, Lisa claims to be Native American for a school presentation while Bart gets a driver's license and starts a romantic relationship with a girl. Natalie Portman guest starred as Darcy. The episode received positive reviews.

== Plot ==
Lisa cannot find anything interesting in her family heritage for a school presentation, so she decides to take creative license. Inspired by Bart's "Indian butter trick", the family's cornstalk-pattern kitchen curtains and the Hitachi brand of the family's microwave oven, Lisa claims to be Native American, from the "Hitachi" tribe. After impressing Principal Skinner with her presentation, she is chosen to represent the school for a performance at City Hall, making her feel guilty. Lisa gives a presentation about her fake heritage, and a Native American reporter questions her story. When Lisa makes another speech about her fake heritage as a keynote speaker for the National Native American Tribal Council, she loses her resolve and admits she lied, but is spared from prosecution when the other speakers admit they are not true Native Americans. As Homer takes Lisa off stage, Homer confesses that one of his ancestors was Native American, much to Lisa's chagrin.

Meanwhile, Bart steals the school fire extinguishers to propel a wagon he is riding while a series of events causes a wildfire in town. As Bart rockets through town, the foam released from the extinguishers puts out the wildfire. Bart is cheered by everyone, and Mayor Quimby offers to fulfill one wish for him as a reward. He chooses to get a driver's license. Homer forces Bart to drive him around and perform errands for him. When he tires of Homer's requests, he drives out of town where he meets Darcy, 15-year-old girl, and pretends to be much older. They begin a romantic relationship, and Darcy pressures him to get married. At the courthouse, Bart reveals his age, but Darcy admits that she is pregnant, but that Bart is not the father because they have not consummated their relationship. She says the biological father is an exchange student, but she wants the baby to have a father. Bart comforts a distraught Darcy, vowing to find a way. The courthouse clerk suggests they go to Utah, where the marriage laws are less strict.

When Homer and Marge learn that Bart went to Utah to get married, they go with Darcy's parents to stop the wedding ceremony. Darcy's father accuses Bart of taking advantage of Darcy, but she tells him that Bart is not the father and that she did not want her parents to be disappointed. Darcy's mother confesses that she is also pregnant, and they agree to raise the babies as twins. Darcy and Bart end their relationship amicably, with Bart assuring Darcy that they will meet again. Later, Bart admits to Homer that he looked forward to being a father, and Homer cheers him up by having Bart drive him around town.

== Production ==
Natalie Portman guest starred as Darcy.

== Reception ==
=== Viewing figures ===
The episode earned a 2.9 rating and was watched by 8.18 million viewers, which was the 51st most-watched show that week.

=== Critical response ===
Robert Canning of IGN gave the episode a 7.2 out of 10 rating, stating "the episode was enjoyable and featured a decent guest voice appearance from Natalie Portman. It was a half hour that felt more like a classic Simpsons episode than the series has given us lately, both with story structure and references, which was bound to make any longtime fan happy."

Adam Finley of TV Squad said the episode had "plenty of smart dialogue and enough hidden gags" to watch multiple times and "felt like two episodes in one".

Colin Jacobson of DVD Movie Guide said the episode was "above-average" and enjoyed Bart's plot, but he thought the episode had "less than inspired plot choices."

On Four Finger Discount, Guy Davis and Brendan Dando enjoyed the episode, especially Bart's part, but thought Lisa was out of character in the episode
