= Springfield Up =

- The Simpsons episode
- Episode no.: Season 18; Episode 13
- Directed by: Chuck Sheetz
- Written by: Matt Warburton
- Production code: JABF07
- Original air date: February 18, 2007

Guest appearance
- Eric Idle as Declan Desmond

Episode features
- Couch gag: The lights turn on to reveal the family has cockroach bodies. They all scurry away, save for Maggie who hides behind the couch.
- Commentary: Al Jean; Matt Warburton; Matt Selman; Michael Price; Max Pross; David Silverman; Chuck Sheetz

Episode chronology
← Previous "Little Big Girl"	Next → "Yokel Chords"
- The Simpsons season 18

"Springfield Up" is the thirteenth episode of the eighteenth season of the American animated television series The Simpsons. It originally aired on the Fox network in the United States on February 18, 2007. In the episode, filmmaker Declan Desmond (Eric Idle) returns to Springfield to film the continuation of his documentary series Growing Up Springfield, which chronicles the lives of several Springfield residents. He visits the town with a film crew every eight years to see how the lives of these people have changed, a plot which parodies the Up documentary series.

"Springfield Up" has received generally positive reviews from critics.

== Plot ==
Eccentric documentary filmmaker Declan Desmond offers an inside look at his documentary, Growing Up Springfield. His film follows the lives of several Springfield residents, returning to them after eight-year intervals to examine how their lives have changed.

Particularly featured is Homer, who had wanted to be a rich and successful rock musician as a child, started a family as an adult, and now lives in an enormous mansion. He explains that he became a success after creating a pen that dispenses condiments. As Desmond is interviewing Marge, Mr. Burns arrives; the mansion is his summer home, and he did not give them permission to use it. He has Smithers, who was tied up by Homer inside a grandfather clock for three days, release attack dogs on the family to chase them away, although he has to go back to Burns' other home to collect the dogs first. Desmond follows Homer to try and humiliate him after pretending to be rich. Homer admits to the camera that he had wanted to be the cool person in Declan's documentary, but had realized that he was only in the documentary to make everyone else look good. As Homer walks away, Desmond tries to end the scene with the words "Strong words from a dumpy man" and tries to cut the camera, but Marge then angrily urges the cameraman to keep filming as she confronts Desmond, telling him that Homer went through a lot of trouble to impress him and that Desmond was wrong to intrude on their lives.

While drinking in Moe's, Desmond admits to Moe that he regrets humiliating Homer. Moe tells him that he was wrong to judge Homer as he is married to Marge, has three children, a job and his own home. Desmond produces a compilation of people saying good things about him. When Homer watches it, he realizes that spending time with his family and friends has made him truly happy. Nevertheless, Homer vows to achieve his dream of rock stardom within the next eight years. Homer and Desmond then sing a duet of a song Homer wrote called "Satan You're My Lady" as an exasperated Marge looks on.

== Production ==
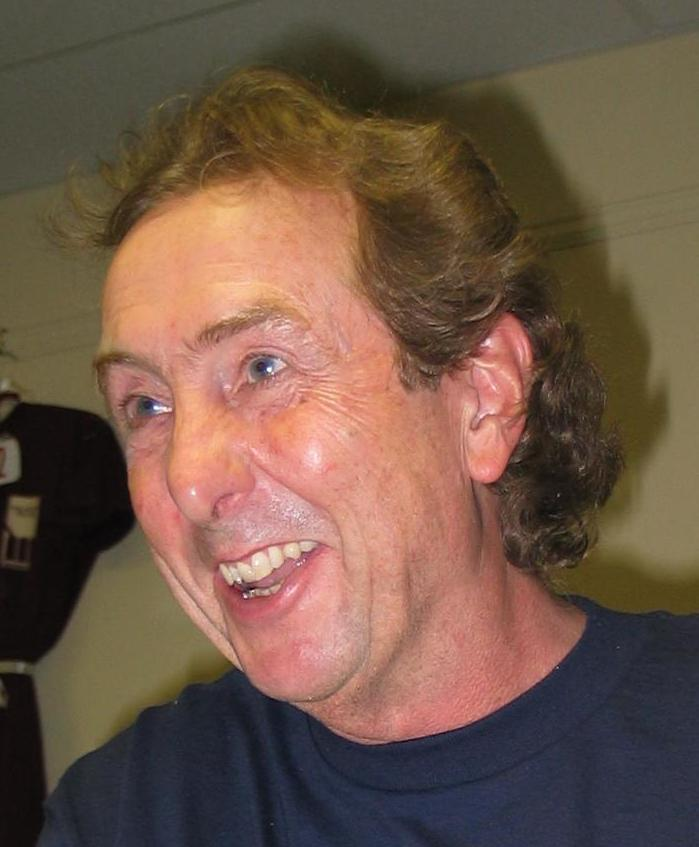
Eric Idle reprised his role as Declan Desmond

The episode was written by Matt Warburton and directed by Chuck Sheetz. It is based on Michael Apted's Up series, a British documentary series that had followed the lives of 14 British children from 1964 to 2019, from when they were seven years old, and returned every seven years to document their lives up until Apted's death in January 2021. English comedian Eric Idle guest starred in the episode as documentary filmmaker Declan Desmond. Idle played Declan in two earlier episodes, "'Scuse Me While I Miss the Sky" (2003) and "Fat Man and Little Boy" (2004).

== Reception ==
"Springfield Up" originally aired on the Fox network in the United States on February 18, 2007.

The episode has received generally positive reviews from critics.

Robert Canning on IGN named it as one of the three "outstanding" episodes of the eighteenth season. He gave it an 8.5/10 rating and commented that it was "by far one of the best Simpsons episodes from the past few seasons. Jokes and gags came fast and furious, all while telling a great story in a cleverly unconventional way," and added that "At its core, 'Springfield Up' was a simple story about Homer feeling the need to impress the snooty British documentarian, but then realizing his life wasn't as bad as he thought. It's a tale we've seen on The Simpsons time and again, but the fresh twist of having it presented within Desmond's documentary made it very memorable."

TV Squad's Adam Finley wrote: "I didn't love it, and I didn't hate it — for the most part, this week's episode was 'just okay' in my opinion. It was nice to see Eric Idle return [...], but the episode felt like two different episodes battling for the same thirty-minute space. [...] In this episode we spend a lot of time learning about those who grew up in Springfield, but Homer's story is also wedged into the mix — it seems the episode should have just been about Homer feeling depressed about his life, or a lighter episode focusing on all the resident of Springfield. I'm not saying the episode was a complete write off, because I think it was still funny, just a little thinner than I come to expect from this series."
