= Please Homer, Don't Hammer 'Em =

- The Simpsons episode
- Episode no.: Season 18; Episode 3
- Directed by: Mike B. Anderson; Ralph Sosa
- Written by: Matt Warburton
- Production code: HABF20
- Original air date: September 24, 2006

Episode features
- Chalkboard gag: "A baby beat me up" (written by Principal Skinner during the episode)
- Couch gag: The couch is replaced by a vending machine filled with various characters; Ralph Wiggum selects a Homer figurine and eats his head.
- Commentary: Al Jean; Matt Selman; Michael Price; Tom Gammill; Max Pross; Mike B. Anderson; Ralph Sosa; Rob Oliver

Episode chronology
← Previous "Jazzy and the Pussycats"	Next → "Treehouse of Horror XVII"
- The Simpsons season 18

"Please Homer, Don't Hammer 'Em" is the third episode of the eighteenth season of the American animated television series The Simpsons. It first aired on the Fox network in the United States on September 24, 2006. In this episode, Marge learns carpentry, but uses Homer as a front when she wants to make money off her talents since no one in Springfield believes that women can be carpenters. Meanwhile, Principal Skinner and Bart fight each other when Bart discovers that Skinner is allergic to peanuts and Skinner discovers that Bart is allergic to shrimp.

It was written by Matt Warburton and directed by Mike B. Anderson with co-direction by Ralph Sosa. In its original broadcast, the episode received 9.72 million viewers.

== Plot ==
On a trip to the extremely rundown Springfield Mall, Homer buys the Time–Life Carpenter's Library series. Homer's interest in carpentry dissolves, and Marge decides to use them herself to fix up the house. She begins to learn more about carpentry and Lisa suggests to Marge that she try to earn some money as a handywoman, thus opening up "Simpsons Carpentry". However, potential clients Superintendent Chalmers and Krusty the Clown turn her down, dismissing the idea of a female carpenter. Commenting on how people expect carpenters to be male, Marge develops a plan: she uses Homer as a front to the customers, while Marge, hiding in a red tool chest, does all of the work as Homer rests in the toolbox, and switches back when the customers come to check on Homer's work.

Though business is going great, Marge becomes discouraged by Helen Lovejoy and Lindsay Naegle, who taunt her for being Homer's "helper". That night, Marge tells Homer that she feels he is taking too much credit and wishes she would get some recognition for the work. Homer, however, does not want to be humiliated by revealing his wife has done everything. Marge continues to get angry after Homer mocks Marge's carpentry skills with Lenny and Carl, and when he tells her he has been hired to repair Springfield's old wooden roller coaster, "The Zoominator", she quits and tells Homer he will have to do the work by himself. Homer tries to fake his way through being a foreman in front of his newly hired construction crew, but they eventually abandon him when he reveals he cannot pay them and does not know anything about construction.

The big reopening day arrives, and Homer stands in front of a crowd gathered to witness the unveiling of the refurbished roller coaster; Marge shows up to witness Homer being revealed as a fraud firsthand. When unveiled, the crowd is in awe at the seemingly repaired roller coaster, but when Homer pops a champagne cork into one of the coaster's segments, it begins to break down rapidly. Marge is horrified that Homer is going to die on the unsafe track and repairs each broken piece just before Homer's cart runs over it. Homer finally reveals to the crowd that Marge did all of the construction work. The crowd applauds as the coaster comes to a stop, and just as Marge is about to tell Homer that she loves him, the entire structure comes crashing down on top of Homer. At the hospital, Marge visits Homer, who is immobilized in a full-body cast, and they make amends.

Meanwhile, a note from Springfield Elementary informs parents that someone at the school has a "life threatening" peanut allergy so foods containing peanuts are banned from school premises. An indignant Bart claims it to be unfair not to disclose the identity of the "kid", but soon discovers the "kid" is actually Principal Skinner. With this newfound knowledge, Bart forces Skinner to publicly humiliate and injure himself by threatening him with a peanut on a stick. After being advised by Comic Book Guy that the only way to stop Bart is to find his "kryptonite", Skinner breaks into the Springfield General Hospital and searches through medical records at night, and discovers that Bart is allergic to shrimp. The next day, Skinner counters Bart's peanut stick with his own shrimp on a stick, and Bart and Skinner clash Star Wars style with their respective "sticks". They eventually end up in a Thai food factory in the "Little Bangkok" section of town. They battle over a rickety catwalk, which is right above a vat of shrimp-peanut mixture. Skinner sees this and attempts to end the battle, but Bart defiantly rushes at Skinner, causing both of them to topple into the vat, and putting them in the hospital in the same room as Homer for their allergic reactions. Skinner is outraged to hear that Marge thinks Bart saved Skinner's life, and the two proceed to throw shrimp and peanuts at each other again, while a disgusted Marge decides to head over to the maternity ward observation room to see the new babies.

== Cultural references ==
The episode's title is a reference to MC Hammer's album, Please Hammer, Don't Hurt 'Em. In the "Captain Blip's Zapateria" full of fictitious arcade classics of the golden age, features a cabinet marked Polybius - an urban legend supposedly constructed as an experimental game-machine unit by the U.S. government - and a game based on Remington Steele, a TV show with the similar premise of a female professional hiring a male front to overcome prejudice. Bart and Skinner's peanut–shrimp fight is a parody of lightsaber duels from the Star Wars film series; it is set to "Duel of the Fates", a piece from the Star Wars prequel trilogy by John Williams. The song playing during the montage of Bart threatening Skinner with peanuts is "Beat on the Brat" by The Ramones. At the run-down mall bookstore where Homer spots the carpentry series of books, Marge is shown standing in front of a tome called "Kansas City Royals--Forever World Champions"; at the time this episode aired, the Royals were 21 years removed from their lone World Series title and were the worst team in baseball, but in 2014 they returned to the World Series and narrowly lost in a seven-game battle with the San Francisco Giants and in 2015 they won their first World Series crown in 30 years. Bart and Skinner falling into a vat of shrimp-peanut mixture is quite similar to the Joker's origin story of falling into a vat of chemicals. The failing state of Springfield Mall, with its crumbling architecture and failed or completely ignored and dated stores, is an early reference to the kind of dead mall that would become very common in the U.S. over the last 15 years.

== Reception ==
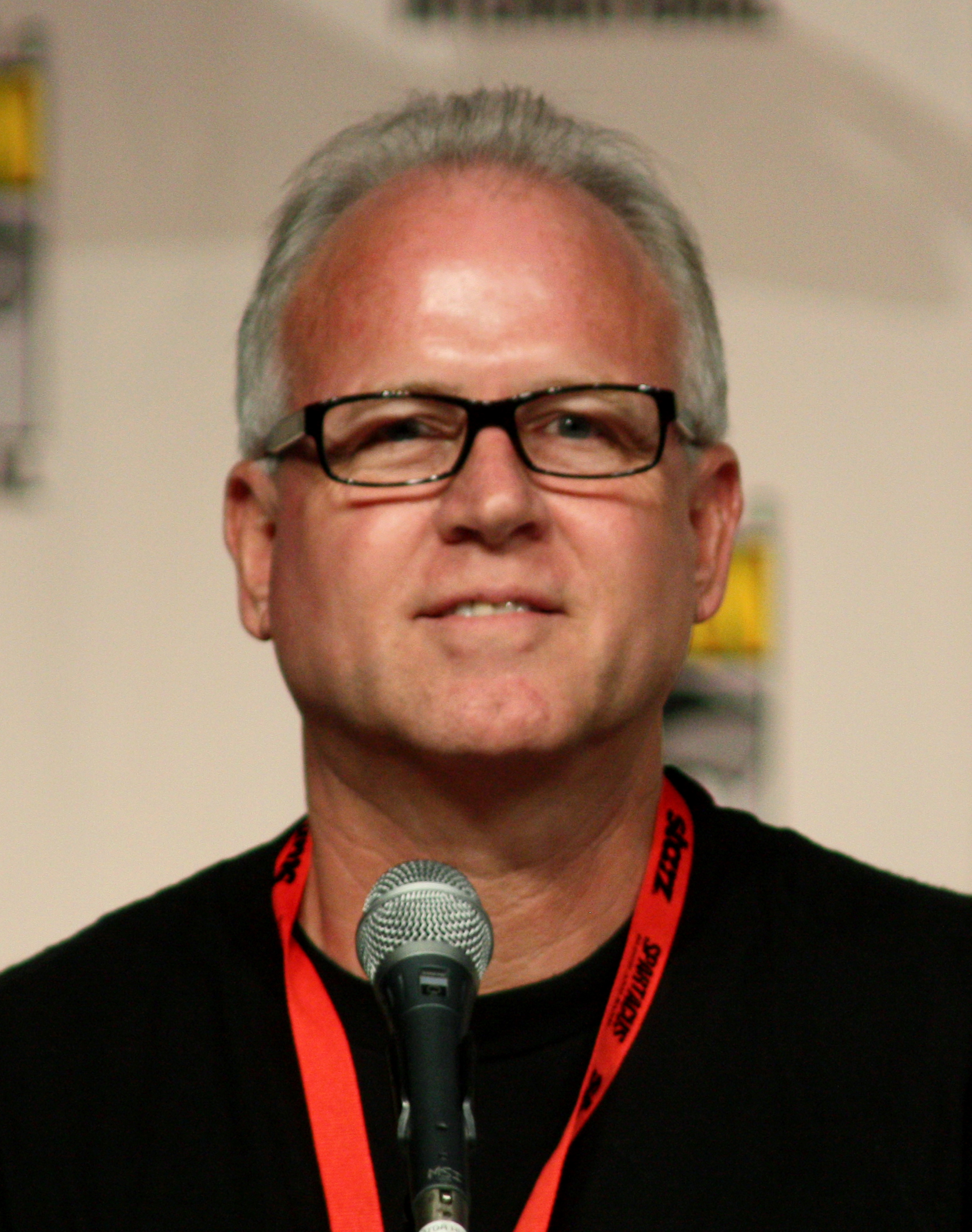
Mike B. Anderson (pictured) directed the episode.

In its original run, the episode received 9.72 million viewers.

Dan Iverson of IGN calls it a brilliant episode; despite the fact the Simpsons have tunneled down a similar storyline, he quotes they've done better in making this plot unique. He gives it a final rating of 7.5/10, better than the previous episodes. Adam Finley of TV Squad, like Iverson, enjoyed the episode's secondary plot with Bart vs. Skinner.
