= Daniel Chun =

Korean American comedy writer

Daniel Chun is a Korean American television comedy writer and producer. He has written for The Simpsons, The Office, Happy Endings, and Speechless. He was named one of Variety's 10 TV Scribes to Watch in 2015.

== Education ==
Chun studied biological anthropology at Harvard University. While at Harvard, Chun was a member of The Harvard Lampoon and got his start in comedy writing there.

== Career ==
Chun worked on The Simpsons for six years (2005–2010) and on The Office for three years (2009–2012), advancing to co-executive producer on both series.

During the 2012–2013 season, Chun worked as a consulting producer and writer on the third season of the ABC comedy series Happy Endings.

In 2015, Fox ordered Chun's ABC Studios pilot Grandfathered, starring John Stamos, to series.

Chun’s writing has also appeared in New York, 02138, Vitals, and TheNewRepublic.com, and The Huffington Post.

Chun is a trustee of The Harvard Lampoon and serves on the Sundance Institute Episodic Advisory Council. Chun has appeared as speaker and mentor at institutions including the University of Pennsylvania, the Austin TV Festival, FAMU in Prague, the Seoul Digital Forum, the Paley Center, the Sundance Institute, and Harvard University.

== Awards and recognition ==
Chun received a Writers Guild Award nomination and an Annie Award for his work on The Simpsons.

Chun was a head writer on The Office and received two Primetime Emmy Award nominations for the series, in 2010 as supervising producer and in 2011 as co-executive producer. Chun was among the writers nominated for Writers Guild of America Awards for his work on The Office.

He was named one of Variety's 10 TV Scribes to Watch in 2015.

While Chun was an executive producer and co-executive producer on Speechless, the series won the 2017 Television Critics Association Award for Outstanding Achievement in Youth Programming.

== The Simpsons episodes ==
- "Marge's Son Poisoning" (2005)
- "Jazzy and the Pussycats" (2006)
- "G.I. (Annoyed Grunt)" (2006)
- "Rome-old and Juli-eh" (2007)
- "Any Given Sundance" (2008)
- "Treehouse of Horror XX" (2009)

== The Office episodes ==
- "Murder" (2009)
- "The Delivery" (2010)
- "Nepotism" (2010)
- "Training Day" (2011)
- "Doomsday" (2011)
- "Tallahassee" (2012)
