= Kill Gil, Volumes I & II =

- The Simpsons episode
- Promotional image featuring Lisa telling Gil what she wants for Christmas.
- Episode no.: Season 18; Episode 9
- Directed by: Bob Anderson
- Written by: Jeff Westbrook
- Production code: JABF01
- Original air date: December 17, 2006

Guest appearance
- Elvis Stojko as himself

Episode features
- Chalkboard gag: "Frankincense is not a monster"
- Couch gag: The family (in Christmas attire) sits on the couch, and the camera pulls out to reveal they are reflected in a Christmas ornament which is on a Christmas tree, and Santa's Little Helper and Snowball II rest nearby.
- Commentary: Al Jean; Jeff Westbrook; Matt Selman; J. Stewart Burns; Tom Gammill; Max Pross; Yeardley Smith

Episode chronology
← Previous "The Haw-Hawed Couple"	Next → "The Wife Aquatic"
- The Simpsons season 18

"Kill Gil, Volumes I & II" is the ninth episode of the eighteenth season of the American animated television series The Simpsons. It originally aired on the Fox network in the United States on December 17, 2006. The episode was written by Jeff Westbrook and directed by Bob Anderson.

This episode won a Writers Guild of America Award for best animated program. The title of this episode is a reference to Kill Bill Volume 1 & 2. Elvis Stojko guest stars as himself. In the episode, when Gil Gunderson is fired from his job, Marge takes pity on him and invites him to stay at the Simpson home. However, he soon outstays his welcome and they are unable to get rid of him.

Following its broadcast, the episode received mixed reviews from critics.

== Plot ==
The Simpson family attends “Krusty’s Kristmas on Ice”, with Elvis Stojko appearing as a special guest. The show ends prematurely when the arena needs to be reset for a basketball game, leading to a brawl between the show's characters and the Utah Jazz. Marge and the kids decide to get up and leave, and Homer is spotted down on the ice grappling with one character, the Grumple (a parody of the Grinch) and demanding he give back the Holiday Cheer. The Grumple repeatedly returns throughout the episode, wanting to kill Homer.

On Christmas Eve, the Simpsons go to Costington's department store where a sad Lisa sits on Santa's lap and explains the one true present she wanted is the Malibu Stacy Pony Beach Party Set, which is sold out everywhere. Santa Claus, who is really Gil Gunderson (this episode reveals his last name), pities Lisa and goes back to the stockroom and finds an extra play set he had seen earlier. An overjoyed Lisa thanks Gil as a cashier rings up the sale. As Marge and the kids exit the store, an angry Mr. Costington comes out of his office and scolds at Gil for selling the Malibu Stacy play set that he had set aside for his daughter. Then when Gil refuses to take the present away from Lisa, Mr. Costington fires him. Marge and the kids witness the scene and feeling sorry for Gil, Marge invites him over for Christmas Eve dinner.

After dinner at home, Gil and the rest of the Simpson family gather around the piano and sing songs. Finishing, Gil gets up to leave; however, Marge insists he stay the night, citing how late and cold it is outside. Gil accepts Marge's offer. On Christmas morning, Gil retrieves items from his bus locker, assuming he had a permanent spot in 742 Evergreen Terrace. Indeed, Gil's weak demeanor and lack of job allows Marge to let him move in, and Homer is too distracted by the Grumple's presence outside the home (where it rhymes about putting Homer's blood in his stew) to pay much notice to Gil.

Gil begins to ruin their holiday. However, Marge continually allows him to stay out of guilt, due to a childhood memory when Patty and Selma stuffed her in her own dollhouse when she refused to hide their cigarettes. Homer's patience wears thin after Marge's inability to say "no" causes Gil to walk in on Homer and Marge's “snuggling” on Valentine's Day, and bring his friends to sing and drink on St. Patrick's Day. After eleven months, when Marge discovers that Gil sent a Christmas card to everyone in Springfield (which is in fact an old family photo with a picture of Gil photoshopped onto it), she finally agrees to say no to Gil and kick him out, only to learn from Bart and Lisa that Gil got a job in a suburb of Scottsdale, Arizona, packed up his things and left that morning.

Gil ends up becoming a very successful realtor in Scottsdale. Despite the fact that Gil has already left for good, Marge wishes to go there and finally get the pleasure of saying “no” to him. After Marge's display of anger towards him and Gil's cowering display of weakness, the other salespeople are amused by Gil's cowardice and Gil's boss charges out of his office and fires Gil on the spot. Marge is horrified when she realizes that her pleasure of saying "no" just cost Gil another job. Feeling guilty, the Simpsons offer to buy a house in Scottsdale in order to allow Gil to keep his job.

At the family's new home in Scottsdale (the mailbox reads The Simpsons and a Jackpot Realty sold sign sits out front), the Simpsons sing Christmas carols, and on the piano, Gil leads them in song. The episode ends with a family of Grumples arriving at the doorstep. Homer lets them in and Gil, the Simpsons, and the Grumples continue happily singing their carols.

== Production ==
Figure skater Elvis Stojko appeared as himself.

== Opening sequence ==
The opening sequence is redesigned in a Christmas style for this episode. Not counting the "Treehouse of Horror" episodes, this is the second time that the title sequence is radically different from the norm. The theme change is that the whole town is covered in white snow. The other changes aside from the theme is that in the garage, Homer runs to the right as opposed to the usual left, with Mr. Burns is dressed as Ebenezer Scrooge and Smithers dressed as the ghost of Jacob Marley, respectively, a sign in the background of the power plant reads "Merry Christmas, No Bonuses" and Jasper is standing where the late Bleeding Gums Murphy stands normally. In the quick pan across Springfield, Maude Flanders can be seen alive. Bart's skateboard is replaced with a snowboard. Marge and Maggie's grocery and car scenes are cut out and everyone is in Christmas attire (which goes with the couch gag where the family sits on the couch and the camera pans out to reveal that they are reflected on a Christmas tree ornament).

== Reception ==
=== Viewing figures ===
The episode earned a 4.4 rating and was watched by 8.88 million viewers.

=== Critical response ===
Dan Iverson of IGN gave the episode the headline of "Worst Simpsons Christmas episode ever!". He explains that though the story wasn't bad, it was merely told poorly, especially the area where Gil gets a new household had made no sense. He writes: "Gil's storyline wasn't the only thing that didn't make sense, as the ongoing joke of the Grumpo [sic] made less sense than most anything from this season." Though he explains that even though the episode was not "all bad", he felt there were a couple of comedic bits to keep the show afloat, such as the unique opening sequence.

Adam Finley of TV Squad thought that the character of Gil was not enough to support an entire episode. However, he liked seeing the Grumple stalking Homer and was not sure what the creature was.

Colin Jacobson of DVD Movie Guide suspected it was Gil's turn to have an episode featuring him. He said "[i]t's not a bad show but it doesn't go far beyond the basics of the Gil role to develop into anything memorable."

=== Awards and nominations ===
In 2008, writer Jeff Westbrook was awarded the Writers Guild of America Award for Television: Animation at the 60th Writers Guild of America Awards for this episode. Three other Simpsons writers were nominated for the award.
