= Raymond S. Persi =

American film producer

- Born: Raymond Saharath Persi
- Occupations: director, animator, writer, and puppeteer

Raymond Saharath Persi is an American animator, director, screenwriter, producer, storyboard artist and voice actor. He has directed many episodes of The Simpsons, including the Emmy Award-winning "The Seemingly Never-Ending Story". Persi went on to work as a sequence director for The Simpsons Movie (2007).

Outside of his Simpsons work, Persi co-directed Squirrel Nut Zippers' "Ghost of Stephen Foster" music video, from the album Perennial Favorites (Mammoth Records). The video won the "Best Animated Music Video" award at the 1999 Vancouver Animation Festival and was nominated for the Annie Award for Best Animated Short Subject. Raymond also created the character and performance "RayRay".

In 2010, Persi moved from Film Roman to Walt Disney Animation Studios where he worked extensively on Academy Award nominee Wreck-It Ralph (2012). In addition to serving as storyboard artist, he had a prominent acting role in the film as Gene, leader of the Nicelanders whom Wreck-It Ralph is programmed to antagonize. Persi also voices the Zombie from The House of the Dead in a scene where Ralph joins other video game villains at a support group meeting.

Persi has become a mainstay with Disney, providing additional voices and storyboard work for Frozen (2013), as well as the voice of Flash Slothmore and Officer Higgins in Zootopia (2016).

In 2019, he was hired as the co-director of the Netflix animated film Extinct (2021).

Persi is half-Thai on his mother's side. Saharath, Persi's middle name, is used in the credits for "Love, Springfieldian Style".

== Filmography ==
- Wreck-It Ralph (2012) – Voice of Gene and Zombie
- Get a Horse! (2013) – Voice of Pete's Car Horn
- Frozen (2013) – Additional Voices
- Zootopia (2016) – Voice of Flash and Officer Higgins
- Inner Workings (2016) – Voice of Stomach and Monk
- Ralph Breaks the Internet (2018) – Voice of Gene (Cameo)
- Santa's Little Helpers (2019) – Voice of Head Elf
- Minions: The Rise of Gru (2022) - Voice of Birthday Boy
- Zootopia+ (2022) – Voice of Flash (Episode: "Dinner Rush")
- Once Upon a Studio (2023) – Voice of Flash
- Zootopia 2 (2025) – Voice of Flash (Cameo)

== Simpsons episodes directed by Persi ==
=== Season 16 ===
- "Mobile Homer"

=== Season 17 ===
- "The Girl Who Slept Too Little"
- "The Seemingly Never-Ending Story"
- "The Monkey Suit"

=== Season 18 ===
- "Little Big Girl"
- "24 Minutes"

=== Season 19 ===
- "Love, Springfieldian Style"

=== Season 20 ===
- "Lost Verizon"
- "Four Great Women and a Manicure"

=== Season 21 ===
- "The Color Yellow"

== Accolades ==
Award	Category	Work	Result	Ref(s)
Primetime Emmy Awards	Outstanding Animated Program (For Programming Less Than One Hour)	The Simpsons (for episode "The Seemingly Never-Ending Story")	Won	
