= Hostile Kirk Place =

- The Simpsons episode
- Episode no.: Season 34; Episode 16
- Directed by: Steven Dean Moore
- Written by: Michael Price
- Production code: OABF09
- Original air date: March 12, 2023

Guest appearances
- Kerry Washington as Rayshelle Peyton; "Weird Al" Yankovic as himself

Episode features
- Couch gag: "Weird Al" Yankovic plays the accordion by the couch as the Simpson family watches. After he finishes, he asks to stay for dinner, but Homer rejects him.

Episode chronology
← Previous "Bartless"	Next → "Pin Gal"
- The Simpsons season 34

"Hostile Kirk Place" is the sixteenth episode of the thirty-fourth season of the American animated television series The Simpsons, and the 744th episode overall. It aired in the United States on Fox on March 12, 2023. The episode was directed by Steven Dean Moore and written by Michael Price.

In this episode, when Kirk Van Houten learns that his ancestor caused a town disaster, he demands that students stop learning about it. The episode received mixed reviews.

== Plot ==
A fire at Springfield Elementary School forces the school to be closed for weeks. The town's children are forced to be home-schooled where they learn about the collapse of the Great Springfield Gazebo. The mayor at the time, an ancestor of Kirk Van Houten, was blamed for the incident, which saddens the Van Houten family. Meanwhile, Marge prevents Homer from spending more money buying products advertised on late-night commercials. At Moe's Tavern, Moe tells Homer to invent a product to make back his money and tells Kirk to assert himself.

After the school reopens, Kirk demands that the students stop learning about the gazebo incident. At a school meeting, Kirk gains support from people who do not want to learn about the uncomfortable parts of history while others want to continue learning. The meeting ends in a stalemate. Meanwhile, Homer decides to make shirts with electric signs. Later, Kirk and his supporters protest against learning about the gazebo incident and clash with the Prince family. The violence forces Mayor Quimby to give in to Kirk's demands.

Several weeks later, Kirk has taken control of the town, and Homer has opened a shirt store, which supplies Kirk's supporters with slogans. Marge asks Kirk to cede power, but he refuses. Kirk decides to build a new Great Gazebo. At its opening, Kirk plays an electric guitar. Combined with the electric shirts, the electric wave causes the gazebo to collapse. This prompts Homer to comment that, unlike history, science cannot be ignored.

In the future, a teacher talks about the second gazebo disaster, which leads to a group of parents turning the teacher into dust.

== Production ==
Musician "Weird Al" Yankovic guest starred in the couch gag as himself. He previously appeared in the fourteenth season episode "Three Gays of the Condo" and the nineteenth season episode "That '90s Show."

== Reception ==
=== Viewing figures ===
Airing against the 95th Academy Awards, the episode earned a 0.22 rating and was watched by 0.77 million viewers, which was the third-most watched show on Fox that night.

=== Critical response ===
Tony Sokol of Den of Geek gave the episode 3.5 out of 5 stars. He called the episode an "ambitious entry" that accurately reflects the current American political situation. He also highlighted how Homer's subplot moves the story forward.

John Schwarz of Bubbleblabber gave the episode a 7.5 out of 10. He thought the story of erasing historical context was not fully developed. He highlighted the subplot of Homer making money from people on each side of the issue.
