= The Homer of Seville =

- The Simpsons episode
- Bart and Lisa see Homer's painting, a parody of Michelangelo's The Creation of Adam.
- Episode no.: Season 19; Episode 2
- Directed by: Mike Frank Polcino
- Written by: Carolyn Omine
- Production code: JABF18
- Original air date: September 30, 2007

Guest appearances
- Plácido Domingo as himself; Maya Rudolph as Julia

Episode features
- Chalkboard gag: "The Wall Street Journal is better than ever"
- Couch gag: Repeat of the "Homer Evolution" couch gag from "Homerazzi"; Marge's "What took you so long?" is changed to "Did you bring the milk?".
- Commentary: Matt Groening; Al Jean; Carolyn Omine; Michael Price; Tom Gammill; Max Pross; David Silverman; Mike Frank Polcino

Episode chronology
← Previous "He Loves to Fly and He D'ohs"	Next → "Midnight Towboy"
- The Simpsons season 19

"Homer of Seville", also known as "The Homer of Seville", is the second episode of the nineteenth season of the American animated television series The Simpsons. It first aired on the Fox network in the United States on September 30, 2007. In the episode, Homer gains an operatic ability to sing following an accident, and becomes a professional and famous opera star. While running from a mob of crazed fans, he is saved by Julia, a beautiful and dangerous stalker.

The episode was written by Carolyn Omine and directed by Mike Frank Polcino, while Plácido Domingo guest stars as himself, Karl Wiedergott portrays the Hockey Player and Fan #2, and Maya Rudolph guests as Julia.

It averaged 8.4 million viewers, with a Nielsen rating of 4.2 and an audience share of 11 percent. It was nominated for a Writers Guild of America Award in 2008. Since airing, the episode has received mixed reviews from television critics.

== Plot ==
After escaping church, the Simpsons look for a place to eat lunch. Upon seeing that all the restaurants have long lines, the family spots a catering van setting up food at a house. The family sneaks in and gorges themselves, only to find they have snuck into a wake. Homer is asked to be a pallbearer (to which he agrees thinking the woman who asked him meant a polar bear). At the cemetery, Homer struggles with the coffin and falls into an empty grave, hurting his back in the process. At the hospital Dr. Hibbert treats Homer and sets up to give him an X-ray to check out his vertebrae. While lying on his back, Homer hears the cost of the X-ray, and lets out a "D'oh!". To the surprise of everyone, Homer's “D’oh!” sounds beautiful and operatic. Dr. Hibbert concludes that when Homer lies on his back his stomach lodges underneath his diaphragm, which in turn helps propel his powerful singing voice.

Dr. Hibbert tours Homer around the hospital while singing "If Ever I Would Leave You", to help alleviate patient suffering. Mr. Burns overhears Homer's voice and hires him to star as Rodolfo in La bohème at the Springfield Opera House. Despite having to sing on his back, Homer quickly becomes an opera star. Homer's growing fame and success gains him loyal fans, and he gives advice to famous opera singer Plácido Domingo.

Homer, Marge, Lenny and Carl share their wedding anniversary dinner at a nice restaurant. Marge tells Homer she is glad he has become famous, but she misses their privacy. After Lenny and Carl leave, Homer is hounded by adoring fans. Marge gets fed up and storms out of the restaurant and Homer follows after her. On the street, Homer tries to make up with Marge, when a large group of fans spots Homer and Marge and chases after them. Homer and Marge are trapped in an alley; just before the mob reaches them, a black clad biker on a motorcycle shows up to drive Homer and Marge to safety.

Back at home, Marge and Homer are surprised to find that the mysterious rider is a woman — Julia Eldeen (Maya Rudolph). Julia, also a fan of Homer, explains she hates how all the other fans constantly mob him. She proposes they hire her to be Homer's manager, so she can take care of everything. Marge loves the idea, and goes to the kitchen to make a celebratory pie. With Marge gone, Julia reveals her true intentions: standing naked before Homer, she says he can have her anytime he wants. She threatens to tell Marge he attacked her, should he tell.

Although crazily obsessed with Homer, Julia proves to be a great fan club president and Marge is impressed with her efficiency. Her continual sexual advances force Homer to put his foot down and fire Julia, who vows to get back at Homer. At breakfast the next day, Homer pours himself a bowl of cereal and a cobra hidden inside the cereal box attempts to attack him. He pacifies the cobra by repeatedly swinging it against the refrigerator. Lisa concludes Julia is trying to kill him for firing her. Springfield's finest are put on bodyguard detail for Homer.

As Homer prepares for his next performance, Marge pleads with Chief Wiggum to cancel the show, but he convinces her that Homer will be safe, explaining that the opera house is under total surveillance. Later, while Homer performs on stage, Marge and the kids remain on the lookout for Julia. Bart spots her disguised as the conductor and Marge watches in horror as Julia loads a poison dart into her conductor's baton. Just as Julia prepares to use her baton, Marge grabs a French horn and uses it to redirect the dart back at Julia. Upon being hit by the dart Julia falls to the ground and Chief Wiggum calls on his snipers to finish her off. Every bullet misses, except for one; a second later, the giant chandelier falls from the ceiling and crashes on top of Julia. Julia is wheeled into an ambulance, vowing to return. Homer and the family head for home and Homer announces that he is retiring from the opera and explains that he can think of a much more fun thing he can do while on his back: painting. It is shown then that he painted a version of the Sistine Chapel roof on the ceiling of his living room, with him as Adam and Marge as God. An instrumental version of "Se il mio nome saper voi bramate" (which was being sung by Homer in the last operatic scene) plays as the credits roll over a black background.

== Cultural references ==
- The title is a reference to The Barber of Seville.
- The church calls "Jesus: The Real American Idol".
- Homer mentions Au jus.
- The Springfield Opera House resembles the Sydney Opera House.
- Plácido Domingo claims his nickname is "P Dingo".
- Homer slaps the cobra against the fridge and holds it up for Maggie to laugh at, referencing a scene in The Jungle Book.
- After Homer worries that there might be people out there trying kill him he deduces that the cobra might be their symbol; a possible reference to Cobra, a villainous organization from G.I. Joe that has the animal as their emblem.
- During Homer's first performance, the shot pans upwards, past all the scenery to Lenny and Carl in the rafters, who comment on Homer's performance, a reference to Citizen Kane.
- The pan also passes a large red sign saying 'L'amour' referring to Baz Luhrmann's adaption of La Bohème, which featured that sign as a scenery piece.
- Homer's entourage, Lenny and Carl, parody the series Entourage.
- The stores the family pass by are pop-culture parodies.
- The montage scene of Julia stalking Homer is accompanied by music from the overture of Mozart's Don Giovanni.
- Julia closing her eyes, revealing "Love You" on her eyelids parodies a similar scene in Raiders of the Lost Ark.
- Chief Wiggum cuts down the hanging chandelier, due to the possible dangers of it falling. This is most likely a reference to The Phantom of the Opera.
- A poster of The Phantom of the Opera also appears on the wall of Homer's dressing room at the opera house.
- When Bart sees the poison dart used by Julia, Marge mentions Arthur Fiedler the Boston Pops Orchestra conductor carried one with him.
- The scene of Homer painting the ceiling on his back is a reference to The Agony and the Ecstasy.
- On their way home from church, Marge names several restaurants they pass by. One of these is "Buffet the Hunger Slayer," a reference to Buffy Summers of Buffy the Vampire Slayer.
- At the end of the episode, Homer is seen painting the Creation of Adam, a fresco painting of the Sistine Chapel ceiling, onto his living room ceiling. In Homer's painting, he takes the place of Adam and Marge takes the place of God.

== Reception ==
In its original American broadcast, "Homer of Seville" was watched by an average of 8.4 million viewers, with an overnight Nielsen rating of 4.2 and an audience share of 11 percent.

Since airing, the episode has received mixed reviews from television critics.

Robert Canning of IGN gave the episode a poor review (4.5/10), finding the plot contrived and Homer's rendition of "If Ever I Would Leave You" unfunny. He did, however, enjoy the episode's opening scenes in the church.

Richard Keller of TV Squad thought the episode was decent with several laughs, the funniest moment being when the chandelier crashes down on Julia. He also praised voice actor Dan Castellaneta's professional singing voice.

The episode was nominated for a Writers Guild of America Award in 2008, but lost out to an episode from the previous season, "Kill Gil, Volumes I & II".
