= Mona Leaves-a =

- The Simpsons episode
- Episode no.: Season 19; Episode 19
- Directed by: Mike B. Anderson; Ralph Sosa
- Written by: Joel H. Cohen
- Production code: KABF12
- Original air date: May 11, 2008

Guest appearances
- Glenn Close as Mona Simpson; Lance Armstrong as himself

Episode features
- Chalkboard gag: "This punishment is not medieval (written in a medieval-style typeface)
- Couch gag: The "evolution gag" from "Homerazzi"; for the third time, with Marge's original line, "What took you so long?" after Homer comes home from evolving.
- Commentary: Al Jean; Joel H. Cohen; Matt Selman; Tom Gammill; Max Pross; Mike B. Anderson; Ralph Sosa; David Silverman

Episode chronology
← Previous "Any Given Sundance"	Next → "All About Lisa"
- The Simpsons season 19

"Mona Leaves-a" is the nineteenth and penultimate episode of the nineteenth season of the American animated television series The Simpsons. It originally aired on the Fox network in the United States on May 11, 2008. The episode features the death of Homer's mother, Mona Simpson. Homer is reunited with his mother, Mona, but is not willing to forgive her for all the times she left him as a child. When she dies, a guilt-ridden Homer attempts to make it up to her by fulfilling her final wishes. It was written by Joel H. Cohen and directed by Mike B. Anderson and Ralph Sosa. Glenn Close makes her third appearance as Mona Simpson, and Lance Armstrong has a cameo as himself.

The episode is dedicated to the memories of Elsie Castellaneta (Dan Castellaneta's mother) and Dora K. Warren (Harry Shearer's mother). This episode also marked the start of yearly episodes to deal with women or mothers while airing on Mother's Day.

In its original run, the episode was watched by 6.02 million people.

== Plot ==
As the Simpson family arrive home from their trip to the Springfield mall, they find their door is open, suggesting a burglar is inside the house. Bart fetches Homer a makeshift weapon made from a cinder block tied to a chain that he calls "The Defender". Homer swings it around to threaten the burglar, but when the family smells apple pie, they discover it is actually Homer's mother, Mona Simpson. Mona says that her days of activism are over, and that she is staying for good. Homer explains that he feels hurt and abandoned when Mona is not around, and does not want to feel that way again. Mona tries to explain to Homer she has changed her ways, but, again Homer does not listen.

Later that night, Mona asks if Homer will forgive her, a shaken Homer angrily replies that he will not, because of all the times she left him. Afterwards, Homer realizes he should have listened to his mother, and makes her a card as an apology. But when he goes downstairs to apologize, he sees her sitting in front of the fire, and asks if she is asleep. When he then notices and questions that she is "sleeping with her eyes open", her head slumps down and Homer realizes that she has died.

After Mona's funeral, Homer is depressed and guilt-ridden for not apologizing to his mother and struggles to come to terms with her death, especially since he blames himself for her death. While shopping at the Kwik-E-Mart, he asks Apu what happens when people die. Apu believes that Homer's mother may have been reincarnated, but Ned, being Christian, doesn't buy into it and says to Homer that no one returns as anything from the hereafter. Eventually, the family finds and watches a video will from Mona. They discover that Mona left the family some of her possessions: Marge receives Mona's hemp sulfur purse, Bart receives Mona's Swiss Army knife, and Lisa receives Mona's rebellious spirit. For Homer, however, she leaves a task: to take her ashes to the highest point at Springfield Monument Park and scatter them at exactly 3:00pm. With great difficulty, Homer climbs the mountain in honor of his mother. He releases her ashes, only to find they travel inside the mountain and disrupt a secret nuclear missile launch. Homer is hurt that the last thing Mona told him to do was "one more stupid hippie protest".

Homer is taken captive inside the mountain. There, Mr. Burns explains the purpose of the missile: to send the city's nuclear waste into the Amazon rainforest. Burns imprisons Homer in a room, tied up, and returns Mona's ashes in a vacuum bag to Homer. Outside, the family find Homer and attempt to save him. Bart throws him Mona's knife, which Homer uses to cut himself free. Meanwhile, Marge and Lisa light Marge's hemp purse on fire using a pair of Mona's diamond earrings that Lisa had stolen (jealous that Bart got a tangible inheritance). This creates marijuana fumes through a vent, mellowing out the guards. Homer then breaks free from his prison room using "The Defender", and stops the launch. However, he accidentally pushes the self-destruct button, exploding the launch site and representing Mona's final victory, through her family and over all the things she spent her life fighting for.

Homer escapes on a Union Jack parachute landing next to his family. He then releases his mother's ashes once again (after misunderstanding that he only needed to apply water to Mona's ashes to bring her back to life). The scene then turns into clips of Homer enjoying time with his mother from earlier episodes, which ends with a happy Homer as a child hugging his mother over breakfast.

== Cultural references ==
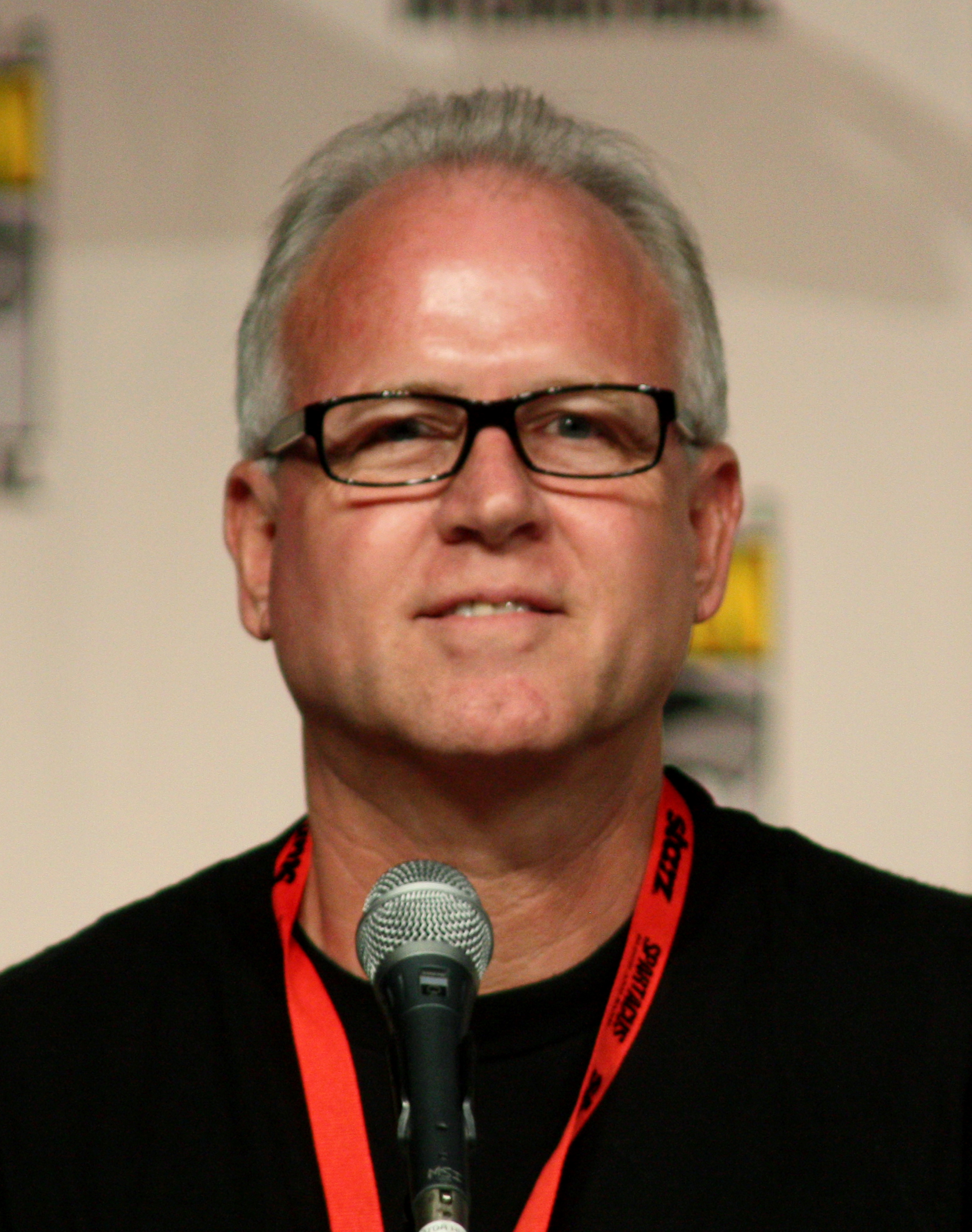
Mike B. Anderson (pictured) directed the episode.

The title is a reference to Da Vinci's most famous painting, the Mona Lisa. This is the third Simpsons episode to be named after the painting, after "Moaning Lisa", "Moe'N'a Lisa" and before "Loan-a Lisa". Homer compares Mona's disappearances to the show Scrubs when he says "You keep disappearing and reappearing — and it's not funny." The base with the rocket of nuclear waste inside the mountain is a reference to the James Bond Film You Only Live Twice in which there is a rocket base located inside of a volcano. When Homer escapes the base on the Union Jack parachute, it is a reference to another Bond film, The Spy Who Loved Me. Many musical cues throughout the episode also reference to the music of the Bond Franchise. The ESPY Awards features Lance Armstrong and Fozzie Bear. The "Stuff-N-Hug" store at the Springfield Mall is a parody of the Build-A-Bear Workshop chain.

A fraction of Jefferson Airplane's "White Rabbit" is heard after Marge sets her purse on fire. This episode also marks the third episode of a Fox animated series to deal with the death of a parent shown between 2007 and 2008, with the Family Guy episode, "Peter's Two Dads", and the King of the Hill episode, "Death Picks Cotton" dealing with similar themes, and the killing off of a main character's parent, Francis Griffin in the former, and Cotton Hill in the latter.

== Reception ==
The episode was watched in 6.02 million homes and garnered a 2.9 Nielsen rating and a 9% share, placing it third in its timeslot.

Both Robert Canning of IGN and Richard Keller of TV Squad called it a decent episode, but criticized Mona's brief appearance. Both, however, found favor with the scene where Homer realized Mona's death, and the tribute at the end.
