= Apocalypse Cow =

- The Simpsons episode
- The episode's promotional image, featuring Bart, Cletus, and Mary (Zooey Deschanel).
- Episode no.: Season 19; Episode 17
- Directed by: Nancy Kruse
- Written by: Jeff Westbrook
- Production code: KABF10
- Original air date: April 27, 2008

Guest appearance
- Zooey Deschanel as Mary Spuckler

Episode features
- Chalkboard gag: "A person's a person, no matter how Ralph"
- Couch gag: A parody of the medieval Bayeux Tapestry shows the Flanders family stealing the Simpson family's couch. The Simpsons then take it back and kill Ned Flanders.
- Commentary: Al Jean; Jeff Westbrook; Tim Long; Tom Gammill; Max Pross; Chuck Sheetz; David Silverman

Episode chronology
← Previous "Papa Don't Leech"	Next → "Any Given Sundance"
- The Simpsons season 19

"Apocalypse Cow" is the seventeenth episode of the nineteenth season of the American animated television series The Simpsons. It originally aired on the Fox network in the United States on April 27, 2008. After joining 4-H, Bart saves a cow named Lou and gives it to a girl named Mary (guest voice Zooey Deschanel), a farm girl. Her father, Cletus, mistakenly believes it as a token for Mary's hand in marriage, and attempts to get the two married.

It was written by Jeff Westbrook and directed by Nancy Kruse. 7.69 million viewers tuned into this episode.

== Plot ==
Bart and Lisa watch Saturday morning cartoons, starting with "Trans-Clown-O-Morphs". The show's main character is quickly placed in a life-threatening situation and pleads with the viewers to help him survive by buying the new Trans-Clown-O-Morphs cereal. Annoyed by the alleged commercial messages placed in every TV show the kids watch, Marge decides to get them away from the TV by having Lisa make banana bread and Bart goes to Shelbyville with Homer to have the beanbag chairs "rebeaned". While Bart and Homer drive to Shelbyville, they see Martin Prince driving a combine harvester. Bart asks why someone like Martin would be driving a tractor, and Martin informs him he has joined 4-H. Lured by the prospect of operating heavy machinery, Bart joins as well and quickly masters driving a tractor. Later, the 4-H volunteer introduces the members to a competition. Taking them to the calf pen, he informs them that they will each pick a calf and raise it over the summer, at the end of which the cattle will be judged at the county fair.

Bart is stuck with the runt of the litter, and is unable to trade it away. He soon meets Mary, and she encourages Bart not to give up in the competition. Bart agrees, and they rename the young bull Lou (previously Lulubelle). Throughout the following weeks, Bart takes good care of Lou and helps him become stronger, while also bonding with him and growing to love him. When the day of the competition arrives, Lou has matured into a large bull and is awarded the blue ribbon. Bart is ecstatic until Lisa informs him that the next step is to send Lou to a slaughterhouse.

Bart tries to convince Marge and Homer to buy the bull, but knowing by experience how expensive it is to care for a large animal, they refuse. That night, Bart hears mooing as he lies in bed and believes it to be a hallucination caused by his inability to help Lou. He starts yelling in fear, and Lisa arrives and says it is simply his subconscious telling him to stop eating meat. However, the mooing is suddenly replaced by clucking noises, and Bart discovers that it was only a CD of Tress MacNeille's "Anguished Animals III," placed by Lisa, in an attempt to turn him vegetarian. Nevertheless, Bart, Lisa, and Lisa's friends, "Compost" and "Solar Panel", go to the slaughterhouse in the middle of the night, determined to save Lou. They discover that Lou, who has been fed growth hormones, is now much bigger, so they use a forklift to pick him up and carry him away (though not without some trial and error). Hurrying from the slaughterhouse, they decide the only safe place they can take him is to Mary's home, which is on a farm. The next morning, they are shocked to discover that Cletus Spuckler is Mary's father.

Bart gives the cow to Mary, and Mary agrees to take it. Cletus then yells for Brandine to come to the door. When Brandine learns that Bart offered Mary the cow, she informs them that the giving of a cow constitutes a formal proposal of arranged marriage. Against the wishes of both Bart and Mary, Cletus and Brandine plan the wedding for the next day; Lisa convinces Bart to go along with it long enough to let them figure out a way to save Lou, correctly suspecting that Cletus will not keep the bull if Bart refuses. Upon learning what has happened, Homer and Marge are shocked, and Marge devises a scheme to prevent it, but she also agrees to save Lou, knowing how Bart rarely cares about anyone or anything. The next day, Marge arrives to stop the wedding, prompting Cletus to send Lou to the slaughterhouse. However, the "Lou" Cletus sent was actually Homer in a cow mascot suit, while the real Lou is being sent to India to be treated like a god. They save Homer from the slaughterhouse after a close shave, after which Homer vows to cut back on his meat eating, and Bart reflects with pride that he can finally say that, "I had a cow, man."

== Cultural references ==
The episode's title is a reference to the film Apocalypse Now.

"Trans-Clown-O-Morphs" is a parody of Transformers, complete with a cartoon opening reminiscent of actual 1980s cartoons.

On the way to Shelbyville, Bart questions Homer's story about Dean Martin, as it does not match with his Wikipedia entry. Homer replies calmly, "Don't worry about Wikipedia, son. When we get back, we'll change it. We'll change a lot of things."

The scene in which Bart is driving the combine contains a theme song from The Comancheros.

The training of Lou punching meat is similar to a scene in Rocky.

Spider Pig makes an appearance in the episode, as a present at Bart and Mary's wedding.

Lisa plays a "The Anguished Animals III' CD by Tress MacNeille, MacNeille voices several Simpsons characters.

When Bart is combining, he goes over manure and creates DVD copies of Pirates of the Caribbean 3.

The farming scenes music is from Aaron Copland's "The Red Pony (Copland) - Dream March". The music playing in the pre nuptial party is a yokel version of "Pachelbel's Canon", one of the most famous pieces of wedding music.

Marge stops the wedding just like she does in "Little Big Girl".

When Bart says goodbye to Lou at the airport, he used the same speech Rick said to Ilsa at the end of Casablanca; moreover, the music theme on this scene is "La Marseillaise".

Mary's middle name is WrestleMania.

== Reception ==
7.7 million viewers tuned into this episode, higher than the previous three episodes.

Richard Keller of TV Squad thought of the episode as another decent installment in the Simpsons like other Bart and Lisa centric episodes. He thought "it was unfortunate that these kinds of episodes couldn't have dispersed more evenly throughout the season", and that "episodes that center around Bart and Lisa tend to be more interesting...because those characters have more dimensions, and their diverse personalities and passions there is more to explore about them." He also thought of "the idea of Bart being put into a nature-related environment was unnatural like putting Dustin Diamond in an Academy Award-nominated film."

Robert Canning of IGN also enjoyed the episode. Although he mentioned that the episode's plot had already been done numerous times, he enjoyed the unique way in which it was told and was surprised by some of the plot elements, such as Bart being forced to marry Mary. He gave the episode 7.5 out of 10.

In a 2008 interview, Matt Groening named the episode his favorite of the series, citing the part with Homer in the slaughterhouse as the scene he liked best.

Jeff Westbrook won a Writers Guild of America Award in the animation category for writing the episode.
