= The Simpsons season 19 =

Season of television series

The Simpsons
- Season 19
- DVD cover featuring Homer Simpson
- Showrunner: Al Jean
- No. of episodes: 20

Release
- Original network: Fox
- Original release: September 23, 2007 – May 18, 2008

Season chronology
- ← Previous; Season 18 Next → Season 20

The nineteenth season of the American animated sitcom The Simpsons aired on Fox between September 23, 2007, and May 18, 2008. It was the final complete season to be broadcast in 4:3 and in standard definition, although the first nine episodes of the twentieth season, which were holdover episodes of the nineteenth season, would also retain this standard. Al Jean served as the showrunner, a position he has held since the thirteenth season, while the season was produced by Gracie Films and 20th Century Fox Television.

The episode "Eternal Moonshine of the Simpson Mind" won the Emmy Award for Outstanding Animated Program. Work from this season was nominated for another Emmy Award, was nominated for four Writers Guild of America Awards, winning one, and was nominated for one Annie Award.

== Voice cast & characters ==
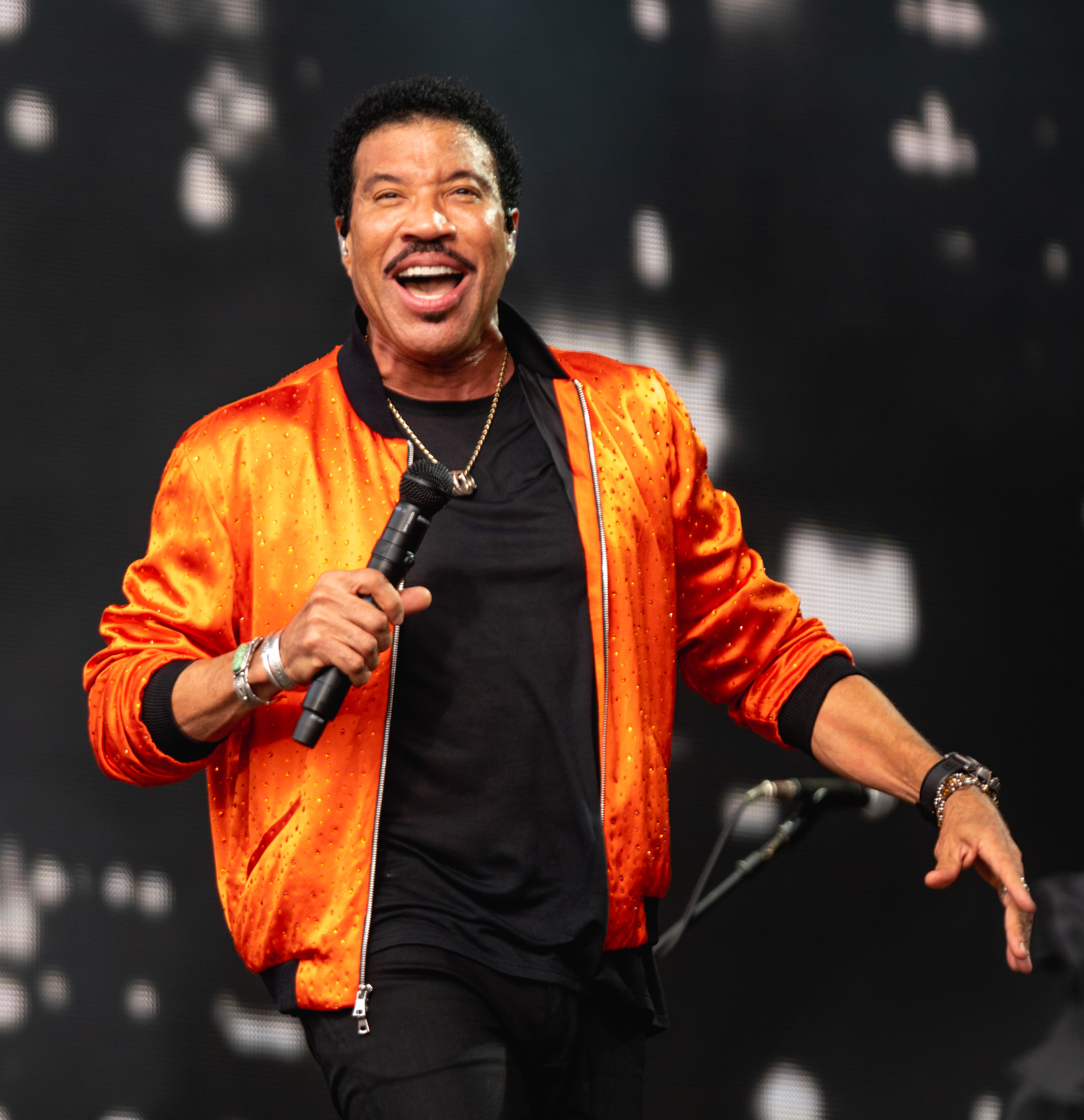
Singer Lionel Richie guest starred as himself in "He Loves to Fly and He D'ohs".

=== Main cast ===
- Dan Castellaneta as Homer Simpson, Itchy, Barney Gumble, Rich Texan, Squeaky-Voiced Teen, Krusty the Clown, Arnie Pye, Mayor Quimby, Sideshow Mel, Santa's Little Helper, Gil Gunderson, Kodos, Grampa Simpson, Groundskeeper Willie, Hans Moleman, Count Dracula, Blue-Haired Lawyer, Mr. Teeny, The Leprechaun and various others
- Julie Kavner as Marge Simpson, Patty Bouvier, and Selma Bouvier
- Nancy Cartwright as Bart Simpson, Ralph Wiggum, Nelson Muntz, Kearney Zzyzwicz, Database, and various others
- Yeardley Smith as Lisa Simpson
- Hank Azaria as Moe Szyslak, Carl Carlson, Duffman, Chief Wiggum, Apu Nahasapeemapetilon, Sea Captain, Old Jewish Man, Lou, Snake, Kirk Van Houten, Comic Book Guy, Dr. Velimirovic, Luigi Risotto, Cletus Spuckler, Professor Frink, Julio, Nash Castor, Wiseguy, Superintendent Chalmers, Gabbo, and various others
- Harry Shearer as Mr. Burns, Waylon Smithers, Scratchy, Ned Flanders, Lenny Leonard, Principal Skinner, Otto Mann, Reverend Lovejoy, Dr. Hibbert, Rainier Wolfcastle, Jasper Beardsley, Kent Brockman, Kang, Judge Snyder, Birch Barlow, Dewey Largo, and various others

=== Supporting cast ===
- Pamela Hayden as Milhouse Van Houten, Jimbo Jones, Rod Flanders, and various others
- Tress MacNeille as Mrs. Vanderbilt, Agnes Skinner, Crazy Cat Lady, Dolph Shapiro, Bernice Hibbert, Opal, Judith Underdunk, Gino Terwilliger, Lindsay Naegle, Lunchlady Dora, Miss Springfield, Brandine Spuckler, Manjula Nahasapeemapetilon, Mrs. Muntz, and various others
- Karl Wiedergott as additional characters
- Maggie Roswell as Luann Van Houten, Helen Lovejoy, and various others
- Russi Taylor as Martin Prince, Sherri, Terri, and various others

=== Guest stars ===
Guest stars for the season included:

- Maurice LaMarche as various
  (2 episodes)
- Marcia Wallace as Edna Krabappel
  (2 episodes)
- Stephen Colbert as Colby Kraus
  ("He Loves to Fly and He D'ohs")
- Lionel Richie as himself
  ("He Loves to Fly and He D'ohs")
- Plácido Domingo as himself
  ("The Homer of Seville")
- Maya Rudolph as Julia
  ("The Homer of Seville")
- Matt Dillon as Louie
  ("Midnight Towboy")
- Steve Buscemi as Dwight
  ("I Don't Wanna Know Why the Caged Bird Sings")
- Julia Louis-Dreyfus as Gloria
  ("I Don't Wanna Know Why the Caged Bird Sings")
- Ted Nugent as himself
  ("I Don't Wanna Know Why the Caged Bird Sings")
- Jack Black as Milo
  ("Husbands and Knives")
- Daniel Clowes as himself
  ("Husbands and Knives")
- Alan Moore as himself
  ("Husbands and Knives")
- Art Spiegelman as himself
  ("Husbands and Knives")
- Sang Am Lee as a Korean singer
  ("Husbands and Knives")
- Kelsey Grammer as Sideshow Bob
  ("Funeral for a Fiend")
- David Hyde Pierce as Cecil Terwilliger
  ("Funeral for a Fiend")
- John Mahoney as Doctor Robert Terwilliger Sr.
  ("Funeral for a Fiend")
- Keith Olbermann as himself
  ("Funeral for a Fiend")
- Dan Rather as himself
  ("E Pluribus Wiggum")
- Jon Stewart as himself
  ("E Pluribus Wiggum")
- Kurt Loder as himself
  ("That '90s Show")
- "Weird Al" Yankovic as himself
  ("That '90s Show")
- Topher Grace as Donny
  ("The Debarted")
- Terry Gross as herself
  ("The Debarted")
- Beverly D'Angelo as Lurleen Lumpkin
  ("Papa Don't Leech")
- The Dixie Chicks as themselves
  ("Papa Don't Leech")
- Zooey Deschanel as Mary Spuckler
  ("Apocalypse Cow")
- Jim Jarmusch as himself
  ("Any Given Sundance")
- John C. Reilly as himself
  ("Any Given Sundance")
- Glenn Close as Mona Simpson
  ("Mona Leaves-a")
- Lance Armstrong
  ("Mona Leaves-a")
- Drew Carey as himself
  ("All About Lisa")
- David Hyde Pierce
- John Mahoney

== Episodes ==
No. overall	No. in season	Title	Directed by	Written by	Original release date	Prod. code	U.S. viewers (millions)
401	1	"He Loves to Fly and He D'ohs"	Mark Kirkland	Joel H. Cohen	September 23, 2007	JABF20	9.55
Taking place two months after the events of The Simpsons Movie. After Homer saves Mr. Burns from drowning, Mr. Burns rewards him with a dinner and a flight on his corporate jet, making Homer disappointed that he will never be rich or successful enough to enjoy the high life. Marge hires a life coach to help Homer, and he gets an interview for a job that requires use of a private jet. She thinks he is hired, but Homer spends his days sitting at Krusty Burger to avoid disappointing Marge until Bart catches him. Homer rents a private plane where he will tell Marge the truth, but the pilot loses consciousness. Homer safely lands the plane but finds private jets to be dangerous and returns to the power plant. Guest Stars: Stephen Colbert and Lionel Richie.
402	2	"The Homer of Seville"	Mike Frank Polcino	Carolyn Omine	September 30, 2007	JABF18	8.51
A freak accident turns Homer into an opera singer, which can only be achieved if he lies down. He becomes the toast of Springfield's cultural elite and the target of a crazed, motorcycle-riding female fan named Julia who blackmails him into becoming his manager and tries to seduce him. He fires Julia who vows revenge. At his next performance, Julia tries to kill shoot a poison dart at him, but Marge saves him, and Julia is injured. Homer then announces his retirement from singing. Guest Stars: Maya Rudolph and Plácido Domingo.
403	3	"Midnight Towboy"	Matthew Nastuk	Stephanie Gillis	October 7, 2007	JABF21	7.89
Marge puts Maggie in a special school to help babies become independent, but when the lessons work too well, Marge finds herself tearfully bonding with a sack of potatoes. Meanwhile, Homer befriends a tow-truck driver named Louie, who shows Homer what it is like to tow vehicles for a living. He decides to be a tow truck drive too, but Louie warns him not to work in his part of town. When the townsfolk become angry at Homer for towing their cars, they trick Homer into towing a car in Louie's neighborhood. Louie kidnaps Homer in retaliation. Maggie rides Santa's Little Helper to rescue Homer, and they return home where she reconciles with Marge. Guest Star: Matt Dillon.
404	4	"I Don't Wanna Know Why the Caged Bird Sings"	Bob Anderson	Dana Gould	October 14, 2007	JABF19	8.70
At the bank, Marge is talking with a man named Dwight who tries to rob the bank. He makes a deal with Marge where he will surrender if she promises to visit him in prison. She tries to go but is unable to arrive during visiting hours. Angry, Dwight breaks out and kidnaps her. They go to an amusement park to go on the rides. Chief Wiggum tries to save them but gets stuck, so Dwight sacrifices himself to save him. He returns to prison where Marge visits him. Guest Stars: Steve Buscemi, Ted Nugent and Julia Louis-Dreyfus.
405	5	"Treehouse of Horror XVIII"	Chuck Sheetz	Marc Wilmore	November 4, 2007	JABF16	11.74
The nineteenth season's annual trio of Halloween stories, all of which are movie parodies: "E.T., Go Home" – In this send-up of E.T. the Extra-Terrestrial, Bart finds Kodos (who is hiding from the government) and helps her obtain devices to contact her home planet, but Kodos' intentions are proven to be murderous. "Mr. & Mrs. Simpson" – In this send-up of Mr. & Mrs. Smith, Homer lives a double life as a government assassin, but discovers that Marge is one too and must eliminate her after she botched his attempt at assassinating Kent Brockman. "Heck House" – In this send-up of Seven Footprints to Satan, Ned Flanders turns the church into a Heck House and asks God for devilish powers so he can teach the children the consequences of committing the seven deadly sins. Guest Star: Maurice LaMarche.
406	6	"Little Orphan Millie"	Lance Kramer	Mick Kelly	November 11, 2007	JABF22	10.53
Milhouse's parents remarry and go on a honeymoon cruise, but they are presumed dead. Milhouse adopts an aloof attitude after hearing the news, making him popular and Bart unpopular. Bart has Milhouse's uncle visit to make him happy but unpopular, but the adventurous uncle makes him more popular. The boys and the uncle fly in a hot air balloon and discover an island where Milhouse's parents have survived. Meanwhile, Marge hides her eyes from Homer after Homer admits that he does not know what Marge's eye color is. He remembers a song he used to sing to Marge and tries to remember the lyrics that contain the color. Marge overhears and reveals that her eye color is hazel.
407	7	"Husbands and Knives"	Nancy Kruse	Matt Selman	November 18, 2007	JABF17	10.56
The Comic Book Guy's Android Dungeon faces competition with "Coolsville Comics 'n Toys," a new comic book store owned by a nicer, more personable store owner named Milo. After losing business, he sells the store to Marge, who creates a gym for the average woman. A self-conscious Homer resorts to plastic surgery after being told that Marge's success will lead to her divorcing Homer and getting a younger, handsomer trophy husband. However, his new appearance horrifies the town, and Marge, disgusted with him, kills him. However, Homer wakes up and realizes that his surgery was cancelled after the surgeon was denied permission from Marge and was dreaming of his new appearance. Guest Stars: Alan Moore, Art Spiegelman, Dan Clowes, Jack Black and Maurice LaMarche.
408	8	"Funeral for a Fiend"	Rob Oliver	Michael Price	November 25, 2007	KABF01	9.01
A night at a rib restaurant turns into yet another plot for Sideshow Bob to kill the Simpson family, but the whole scheme turns into a family affair when Bart kills his mortal enemy by throwing away his nitroglycerine, which Sideshow Bob needs for his heart. Unbeknownst to Bart, Sideshow Bob actually faked his death and is plotting with the rest of the Terwilligers to kill Bart. At the funeral Bart is invited to be with Bob as he is cremated, but Bob traps him in the coffin. Lisa deduces the plan, and Bart is rescued. The Terwilligers are sent to prison. Guest Stars: Kelsey Grammer, David Hyde Pierce, John Mahoney and Keith Olbermann.
409	9	"Eternal Moonshine of the Simpson Mind"	Chuck Sheetz	J. Stewart Burns	December 16, 2007	KABF02	10.07
Homer wakes up in the snow with no memory of what he did the night before and finds Marge and the kids missing. He then goes on a journey inside his memories to remember what had happened. He learns that Moe gave him a drink to wipe his memory but remembers Marge with a black eye and Duffman with Marge. He concludes that Marge is having an affair with Duffman, and he injured Marge when he found out. He tries to commit suicide by jumping off a bridge. During the fall, he remembers that Marge was planning a surprise party for him with Duffman, and he accidentally injured her eye while opening a bottle. He lands on a ship where his party is taking place. He had Moe erase his memory so he would be surprised, and he arranged to ensure he survived the events that would follow.
410	10	"E Pluribus Wiggum"	Mike Frank Polcino	Michael Price	January 6, 2008	KABF03	8.04
Thanks to Homer's latest blunder blowing up every fast-food restaurant in the city, Springfield moves up election day and becomes the first city in the nation to hold primary elections. However, all the media attention and similar-sounding politicians wear on the townspeople's nerves, so they elect Ralph Wiggum to be the 2008 presidential candidate as a joke until Ralph reveals that he wants to be President, so he can bring peace in these divided times. Guest Stars: Jon Stewart and Dan Rather.
411	11	"That '90s Show"	Mark Kirkland	Matt Selman	January 27, 2008	KABF04	7.45
After Marge's diploma fell from a box, a family secret is unraveled: Ten years have passed by between Bart's birth and the meeting of their parents. After high school, Marge wanted to go to college and so Homer helped make her dream come true and paid for it by working for his father. But in class, Marge started to fall for her professor, which ultimately led Homer on the path of musician's fame and depression. When the professor is not interested in getting married, Marge breaks up with him and returns to Homer when she hears his song about her. Guest Stars: Kurt Loder and "Weird Al" Yankovic.
412	12	"Love, Springfieldian Style"	Raymond S. Persi	Don Payne	February 17, 2008	KABF05	7.81
On Valentine's Day, Homer and Marge get stuck in a Tunnel of Love ride after Bart turns the water into Jell-O. To pass the time, the family tells stories of famous couples: Bonnie and Clyde (Homer and Marge cut a path of crime through 1930s Springfield by robbing banks), Lady and the Tramp (Homer and Marge again; this time, as the eponymous dogs from the Disney movie), and Sid Vicious and Nancy Spungen (Nelson and Lisa are punk rockers in love and addicted to chocolate).
413	13	"The Debarted"	Matthew Nastuk	Joel H. Cohen	March 2, 2008	KABF06	8.18
When new student Donny volunteers to take the blame for Bart's prank of Principal Skinner, Bart promises to remember his sacrifice. However, Skinner is using Donny to spy on Bart. When his pranks begin to fail, he suspects a rat and blames Milhouse. When he learns that it is Donny, Skinner catches Bart before he can punish Donny. However, Donny saves Bart, and they part ways. Meanwhile, Homer grows attached to his rental car, which he gets to drive for a week while his old car gets repaired. Later, when he sees his old car being sold, he abandons the rental and takes back the old one. Guest Stars: Topher Grace and Terry Gross.
414	14	"Dial 'N' for Nerder"	Bob Anderson	Carolyn Omine & William Wright	March 9, 2008	KABF07	7.31
Bart and Lisa's prank on Martin Prince goes too far and they worry that they may be implicated in his death by the police and Nelson, who becomes an amateur sleuth. Feeling guilty, they complete a project Martin was working on, but Lisa confesses her actions upon hearing Martin's lute when it is completed. However, Martin emerges and explains how he survived. Meanwhile, Marge calls upon the producer of a reality show that specializes in tracking down cheating couples when she begins to suspect that Homer may be cheating on his diet. However, when she sees that the show is only interested in breaking apart Homer and her, she ends the filming.
415	15	"Smoke on the Daughter"	Lance Kramer	Billy Kimball	March 30, 2008	KABF08	7.14
Lisa is accepted into a ballet school run by jazz dancer Chazz Busby, and discovers that her dancing improves whenever she is around cigarette smoke. Meanwhile, Homer shows Bart his secret beef jerky project, which has been taken over by raccoons. When he tries to kill them, he sees the raccoons are a family like his own and lets them live. Later, Homer stops Lisa from smoking a cigarette and wants her to stop dancing. However, he sees how her dancing makes Marge happy, so he allows her to dance without inhaling smoke. When she is caught, Homer has a raccoon steal the cigarettes during a recital, leading the dancers to perform poorly and Lisa to quit.
416	16	"Papa Don't Leech"	Chris Clements	Reid Harrison	April 13, 2008	KABF09	6.93
When Mayor Quimby launches a campaign to shake down anyone who has not paid taxes in years, Lurleen Lumpkin, the country singer who tried to seduce Homer from the season three episode "Colonel Homer", hides out at the Simpson house, which does not sit well with Marge, who still cannot forgive her for almost stealing her husband. When she learns Lurleen's father abandoned her, she reunites them, but he leaves again. When her father gives one of Lurleen's songs to the Dixie Chicks, she exposes him, and they punish him. Lurleen leaves to be the band's opening act. Guest Stars: Beverly D'Angelo and The Dixie Chicks.
417	17	"Apocalypse Cow"	Nancy Kruse	Jeff Westbrook	April 27, 2008	KABF10	7.75
Bart joins the 4-H Club and befriends a cow named Lou, but when Lou is set to be sent to slaughter, Bart gives Lou to a country girl named Mary, whom he now must marry after finding out that giving a cow to a country girl is considered a marriage proposal in hillbilly tradition. Lisa tells Bart to go along until they can save Lou. Marge stops the wedding after switching Lou with Homer in a cow costume, and Lou is sent to India where cows are sacred. Guest Star: Zooey Deschanel.
418	18	"Any Given Sundance"	Chuck Sheetz	Daniel Chun	May 4, 2008	KABF11	6.28
Lisa begins filming her family after Principal Skinner says that cinema must have drama. Lisa's short film is accepted for the Sundance Film Festival, so the family goes to Utah for its premiere. It becomes a rave with everyone except for the Simpson family. The public hates the family because of their portrayal, and Lisa thinks she may have subconsciously humiliated them on purpose. She sees another film about Nelson and his mother and sees that other families have worse problems. She apologizes to her family, and they reconcile. Guest Star: Jim Jarmusch and John C. Reilly.
419	19	"Mona Leaves-a"	Mike B. Anderson & Ralph Sosa	Joel H. Cohen	May 11, 2008	KABF12	6.08
Mona Simpson, Homer's '60s radical mother, returns, vowing that her days of protesting are over, but Homer will not accept. Things get worse when Mona dies and her last wishes are to have her ashes spread over the mountains. When Homer fulfills her wish, the ashes go into the mountain, which disrupts a nuclear missile launch. Homer is captured, and the ashes are returned to him. The family helps Homer escape, and he accidentally destroys the missile in the process. Guest Stars: Glenn Close, Lance Armstrong. Note: The end of the episode was dedicated to Elsie Castellaneta and Dora K. Warren, the mothers of both Dan Castellaneta and Harry Shearer.
420	20	"All About Lisa"	Steven Dean Moore	John Frink	May 18, 2008	KABF13	6.19
Sideshow Mel narrates the story of how Lisa rose to stardom as Krusty the Clown's latest replacement. Lisa is hired as Krusty's intern, and Mel shows Lisa how to advance. When Lisa starts performing better that Krusty, she takes over the show. She wins the award for Entertainer of the Year but sees the poor fate of previous winners, so she returns her show to Krusty. Meanwhile, Bart and Homer start coin-collecting and go after a rare 1917 coin known as "The Kissing Lincolns" penny. When Mr. Burns buys it at auction, Homer tricks him into giving it to him. Guest Star: Drew Carey.

== Production ==
This is the second of two seasons ordered in March 2006. The nineteenth season of The Simpsons is the first one produced after the movie and contained seven hold-over episodes from season 18's JABF production line. Al Jean served as showrunner, a position he has held since the thirteenth season, while the season was produced by Gracie Films and 20th Century Fox Television.

Army Archerd reported that due to the 100-day Writers Guild of America strike only 22 episodes would be produced instead of the planned 23, which is much closer to the length of a regular season than most live-action and animated programs that were also affected by the strike. Entertainment Weekly also reported that, at the time, there were only six episodes remaining that were ready, which would make the season's production run consist of a total of 22 episodes.

The nineteenth season featured the returns of several characters from previous seasons. Kelsey Grammer made his tenth appearance as Sideshow Bob, and David Hyde Pierce made his second as Bob's brother Cecil Terwilliger in "Funeral for a Fiend". Beverly D'Angelo made her second appearance as Lurleen Lumpkin, who first appeared in season three's "Colonel Homer". Glenn Close returned as Grandma Mona Simpson for the third time.

Matt Groening described this season as "just about our most ambitious yet".

== Reception ==
=== Critical response ===
Robert Canning of IGN gave the series a 6.6 saying that it was "Passable" and that "Heck, read through the comments section at the bottom of our IGN Simpsons reviews and more than half will in some way be talking about the poor quality of recent episodes. (And "poor quality" is putting it politely.)" although he praised the late episodes of the season. Genevieve Koski of The A.V. Club commented on the premiere and the season that "One of the main problems with The Simpsons over the last seven or eight seasons—are we really approaching the point where the show has been mediocre rather than good for longer?—has been its tendency to try to cover too much ground in each episode."

Josh Kurp of Uproxx commented that "That's typical of the season in general: funny moments in otherwise mediocre episodes, except for the brilliant 'Eternal Moonshine of the Simpson Mind'." Liam Gaughan of Collider ranked it 19th on his list "25 Best 'The Simpsons' Seasons, Ranked." He said it was the most ambitious season because it "attempted to satirize many emerging trends in media and popular culture."

=== Awards ===
"Eternal Moonshine of the Simpson Mind" won the Primetime Emmy Award for Outstanding Animated Program (For Programming less than One Hour), the tenth in the history of the show. Alf Clausen also received an Emmy Award nomination for Outstanding Music Composition For A Series (original Dramatic Score) for the episode "Treehouse of Horror XVIII".

At the 61st Writers Guild of America Awards, Jeff Westbrook won the Writers Guild of America Award for Television: Animation for his script for "Apocalypse Cow". The writers for "E Pluribus Wiggum" and "The Debarted" were nominated for the same award. Carolyn Omine was nominated the same award for her script for "The Homer of Seville" at the 60th Writers Guild of America Awards.

"The Debarted" was also nominated for the Annie Award for Outstanding Achievement for Writing in an Animated Television/Broadcast Production at the 36th Annie Awards.

=== Nielsen ratings ===
The Simpsons ranked 83rd in the seasonal ratings getting a viewership of 7.950 million viewers and an 18–49 Nielsen Rating of 3.8 making it the highest-ranking show from "Animation Domination" right above Family Guy.

== DVD release ==
On Saturday, July 20, 2019, it was announced by current showrunner Al Jean during the 2019 San Diego Comic-Con panel that the nineteenth season DVD would be released on Tuesday, December 3, 2019, in the United States and Canada by 20th Century Fox Home Entertainment and Walt Disney Studios Home Entertainment, eleven years after it had completed broadcast on television. The Season 19 DVD includes 20 episodes and features “collectible Homer Simpson packaging,” Jean said. There are also custom menus on every disc, along with commentary on every episode, he added. It is the only DVD release of The Simpsons to be released after The Walt Disney Company's acquisition of 21st Century Fox in March 2019. Frequent guest animator Bill Plympton designed the box art and menu animations, and is given special thanks for doing so in the booklet.

The Complete Nineteenth Season
Set Details			Special Features
20 episodes; 4-disc set (DVD); 1.33:1 aspect ratio; AUDIO; English 5.1 Dolby Digital; Spanish 2.0 Dolby Surround; French 2.0 Dolby Surround; SUBTITLES; English SDH; Spanish			Optional commentaries for all 20 episodes; Introduction ("A Plea for Sanity") with Matt Groening; Special Language Feature; Eternal Moonshine of the Simpson Mind; French (France) 2.0 Dolby Surround; Portuguese 2.0 Dolby Surround; Italian 2.0 Dolby Surround; Hungarian 2.0 Dolby Surround; Featurette; "Thank You"
Release Dates			Optional commentaries for all 20 episodes; Introduction ("A Plea for Sanity") with Matt Groening; Special Language Feature; Eternal Moonshine of the Simpson Mind; French (France) 2.0 Dolby Surround; Portuguese 2.0 Dolby Surround; Italian 2.0 Dolby Surround; Hungarian 2.0 Dolby Surround; Featurette; "Thank You"
Region 1	Region 2	Region 4	Optional commentaries for all 20 episodes; Introduction ("A Plea for Sanity") with Matt Groening; Special Language Feature; Eternal Moonshine of the Simpson Mind; French (France) 2.0 Dolby Surround; Portuguese 2.0 Dolby Surround; Italian 2.0 Dolby Surround; Hungarian 2.0 Dolby Surround; Featurette; "Thank You"
Tuesday, December 3, 2019	Monday, December 2, 2019	Wednesday, December 11, 2019	Optional commentaries for all 20 episodes; Introduction ("A Plea for Sanity") with Matt Groening; Special Language Feature; Eternal Moonshine of the Simpson Mind; French (France) 2.0 Dolby Surround; Portuguese 2.0 Dolby Surround; Italian 2.0 Dolby Surround; Hungarian 2.0 Dolby Surround; Featurette; "Thank You"
