= The Debarted =

- The Simpsons episode
- The episode's promotional image featuring Bart, Donny (Topher Grace) and Milhouse.
- Episode no.: Season 19; Episode 13
- Directed by: Matthew Nastuk
- Written by: Joel H. Cohen
- Production code: KABF06
- Original air date: March 2, 2008

Guest appearances
- Topher Grace as Donny; Terry Gross as herself; Marcia Wallace as Edna Krabappel

Episode features
- Chalkboard gag: "The art teacher is fat, not pregnant"
- Couch gag: Two hands add to a Lite-Brite of the family on the couch.
- Commentary: Matt Groening; Al Jean; Joel H. Cohen; Matt Selman; Tom Gammill; Max Pross; David Silverman; Topher Grace

Episode chronology
← Previous "Love, Springfieldian Style"	Next → "Dial 'N' for Nerder"
- The Simpsons season 19

"The Debarted" is the thirteenth episode of the nineteenth season of the American animated television series The Simpsons. It first aired on the Fox network in the United States on March 2, 2008. The episode was written by Joel H. Cohen and directed by Matthew Nastuk.

In this episode, a new troublesome student named Donny arrives at Springfield Elementary School, prompting a gleeful Bart to befriend him as his partner in pranks. Meanwhile, Marge wrecks the family car, and Homer gets a new luxury vehicle as a loaner car, which he grows attached to. Topher Grace guest starred, and radio host Terry Gross made a cameo appearance. The episode is a parody of the 2006 film The Departed and received mixed reviews.

== Plot ==
Marge is driving Bart and Lisa to school in Homer's car, when the children begin fighting. Distracted by them, she crashes into Hans Moleman's car. Homer goes to get his car fixed and is given a luxurious modern loaner car to use. Homer takes Marge on a romantic drive in the loaner car and impresses her. He receives a phone call telling him that his car is ready to be picked up, but he refuses to give up his loaner and tells them to keep his old car. Later, Homer is driving with Lisa, and, as they pass the car dealership, Homer sees his car being sold to a group of perverted hillbillies. Homer immediately gives up the loaner car and takes back the vehicle he loves.

At school, Bart finds that a new student named Donny has taken his seat. After Donny throws garbage at the school to the delight of the children, Bart feels jealous. He tries to imitate Donny but embarrasses himself instead. When Bart complains to Homer about his situation, Homer encourages him to be confident to win back his classmates. The next day, Bart adds metal plates to Principal Skinner's shoes and employs magnets to control his legs and humiliate him. Bart regains his popularity, but when Skinner asks who is responsible, Donny takes the blame, impressing Bart with his sacrifice. Skinner takes Donny to his office, whereupon Donny is revealed to be working with Skinner and Superintendent Chalmers to get Bart suspended.

Later, Bart invites Donny to his treehouse where Bart rewards him with blue licorice sticks, which turn the eater's tongue blue. At school, Bart is perplexed when Skinner begins to anticipate and foil his pranks. Groundskeeper Willie informs Bart that there is a spy amongst his friends, but Bart suspects Milhouse. With Nelson and Donny's help, Bart imprisons Milhouse in a locker, and plans to egg Skinner's house with an ostrich egg. While helping Skinner hang up a banner, Bart notices that Skinner's tongue is blue and deduces that the spy is Donny. Donny confesses that Skinner and Chalmers recruited him from an orphanage and offered him unnamed incentives to take down Bart's "organization". Bart and Nelson ambush Donny and prepare to force him to ingest enormous quantities of Diet Coke and Mentos. They are caught by Chalmers, Skinner, and Willie, who was also spying on Bart. Feeling remorseful, Donny pushes the Diet Coke and Mentos together and helps Bart escape. Donny then leaves, promising to meet with Bart again and remember their friendship. A rat then runs across the screen to the sounds of "I'm Shipping Up To Boston" as Ralph Wiggum cheerfully says "the rat symbolizes obviousness!"

== Production ==
Topher Grace guest starred as Donny. Radio talk show host Terry Gross guest voiced as herself being heard over the car radio. When recording her part, the director asked that she "sound 'more cartoonish'" that her normal radio voice.

== Cultural references ==
The title and plot of the episode reference the 2006 film The Departed, and the episode contains several elements of the film, including the use of the Dropkick Murphys song "I'm Shipping Up to Boston".

== Reception ==
=== Viewing figures ===
The episode had an estimated 7.9 million viewers and received a 9 percent audience share.

=== Critical response ===
Richard Keller of TV Squad enjoyed the episode and liked the fact that it focused on Bart. "I enjoyed this episode more than the usual ones that have aired during this post-Simpsons Movie season. There were plenty of good moments and a few of them that I actually laughed at."

Robert Canning of IGN said, "This was a fun and funny episode." He thought Homer's loaner car scenes were "just silly enough to make an impact." Canning thought both Topher Grace and Terry Gross did great jobs with their parts. He gave the episode a 7.6 out of 10.

Genevieve Koski of The A.V. Club gave the episode a B. She thought the episode did not have many jokes but liked that the plots did not involve anything outlandish.

On Four Finger Discount, Brendan Dando liked the episode while Guy Davis did not. Both liked that the offering of the blue candy was not an obvious reveal for the audience.

=== Awards and nominations ===
Joel H. Cohen was nominated for Writers Guild of America Award for Television: Animation at the 61st Writers Guild of America Awards for writing the episode. He was also nominated for the Annie Award for Outstanding Achievement for Writing in an Animated Television/Broadcast Production at the 36th Annie Awards.
