= Eternal Moonshine of the Simpson Mind =

- The Simpsons episode
- Promotional image
- Episode no.: Season 19; Episode 9
- Directed by: Chuck Sheetz
- Written by: J. Stewart Burns
- Production code: KABF02
- Original air date: December 16, 2007

Episode features
- Chalkboard gag: "The Capital of Montana is not Hannah."
- Couch gag: Repeat of the Powers of Ten parody couch gag from "The Ziff Who Came to Dinner" and "On a Clear Day I Can't See My Sister", only this time, Homer says "Weird!" at the end.
- Commentary: Al Jean; J. Stewart Burns; Matt Selman; Tom Gammill; Max Pross; Chuck Sheetz

Episode chronology
← Previous "Funeral for a Fiend"	Next → "E Pluribus Wiggum"
- The Simpsons season 19

"Eternal Moonshine of the Simpson Mind" is the ninth episode of the nineteenth season of the American animated television series The Simpsons. It first aired on the Fox network in the United States on December 16, 2007. The episode was directed by Chuck Sheetz and written by J. Stewart Burns.

The episode averaged 10.15 million viewers, winning in its time slot and receiving a 12 percent audience share. The episode follows Homer's attempts to recall a deliberately forgotten memory from the previous night.

At the 2008 Primetime Emmy Awards, the episode won the award for Outstanding Animated Program (for Programming Less Than One Hour). The episode received positive reviews from critics, who often cited it as the best of the season. In 2014, showrunner Al Jean selected it as one of five essential episodes in the show's history.

== Plot ==
One winter morning, Homer wakes up in a pile of snow and does not remember the events of the previous day, commenting that he must have drunk heavily the night before. Homer goes home and finds his family absent and Santa's Little Helper attacks him, though Homer manages to subdue him before escaping. Homer travels to Moe's, where Moe informs him that he was there the previous night and wanted to forget an unpleasant memory. Moe explains he gave Homer a "Forget-Me-Shot", which wiped out the last 24 hours of his memory. Chief Wiggum tells Homer that there was a domestic disturbance at his house last night, which Homer deduces was reported by Ned Flanders. Homer instantly receives a flashback to the night before, showing Wiggum questioning Marge about a black eye she had received, to which Marge nervously replies that she walked into a door.

At the Flanders house, Homer asks Ned what he has done last night; Ned admits that he does not know, but assumed the worst. A still confused Homer goes home, where a picture of Marge causes a flashback of her pleading Homer to stop, and then rubbing her eye in pain. Horrified at the thought of hurting Marge, Homer goes to Grampa Simpson for help. Grampa tells Homer about Professor Frink's new machine that helps people sort through their memories. With the help of this technology, Homer sees himself walking in on Marge with another man in an allegedly compromising position. In the flashback, Marge tells Homer that she did not want him to find out about it, so Homer decides to use Bart and Lisa from a memory of a snow day to help him unmask the man's identity. During their journey, Bart beats up 10-year-old and 20-year-old Homer in flashbacks, and accidentally destroys the memory of Homer's first kiss, who Bart says was with Apu. With their help, Homer is able to jog his memory, which reveals the man to be Duffman. Homer then concludes that Marge was cheating on him with Duffman, resulting in him beating his wife in retaliation.

Homer now considers his life to be worthless and decides to commit suicide by jumping off a bridge. He begins to reconsider, but is pushed off by his "guardian angels," Patty and Selma. While falling, Homer's life flashes before his eyes, shown to the viewers in the style of a YouTube video. He then sees the full memory of the preceding night: Marge was planning a surprise party for Homer finishing his community service, and did not want Homer to find out about it. Duffman, who was hired by Marge to entertain at the party, brings out a bottle of Duff Champagne. Overjoyed, Homer tries to open the bottle, while Marge pleads with Homer to stop, as she wants to save it for the party. The cork flies off and hits Marge in the eye. The flashback ends and, instead of falling to his death, Homer lands on a moon bounce, which is at the surprise party on board a ship.

Lenny and Carl appear and cause a flashback which shows Homer telling his bar buddies that he felt very guilty for finding out about the party that Marge worked so hard on. When Moe offers the Forget-Me-Shot (which Moe spat in), Homer predicts exactly what is going to happen, and tells Lenny to make sure there is a moon bounce at the party. As Homer now deduces, the entire town was in on the plot, concealing the party and counting on Homer to get there in genuine surprise, with Patty and Selma pushing him down to get him to the party, which they nervously admit. When Homer asks Marge why she lied to Chief Wiggum when what happened was only an accident, she claims that she did not want him at the party, because he would bring Sarah Wiggum, whom Marge does not like. Finally, Bart reveals that the dog attacked Homer because he does not take care of him. As the party commences in full swing, Homer opts not to drink this time, telling Marge that this moment at the party and the effort she put into it is what he wants to remember.

== Production ==
In an interview with Entertainment Weekly regarding the renewal of the show in season 23, showrunner Al Jean discusses what episodes that have previously aired might serve well as a series finale. He regards "Behind the Laughter" and "Eternal Moonshine of the Simpson Mind" as the strongest candidates, and further elaborates: "I don’t think we’re a serialized show and I don’t think we’re going to have a Lost finale where we reveal some truth about the world that nobody ever suspected. Whenever we do a last episode, we just hope that it would be sweet, true to the characters, funny, and give you a nice feeling for where the Simpsons would be headed."

== Cultural references ==
The episode's title and the plot of Homer trying to erase an unpleasant memory refers to the film Eternal Sunshine of the Spotless Mind. Homer's life appears in the form of a YouTube video, which is a spoof of Noah Kalina's "Noah Takes a Photo of Himself Every Day for 6 Years", which features the like-titled piano music of Carly Comando's piece "Everyday" featured in the original video. Scrat, the squirrel from Ice Age, makes an appearance trying to catch an acorn off a tree, but is beaten and swatted away by Groundskeeper Willie. Krusty states that he was trying to do a "Don Rickles about Arabs" but it turned into a "Mel Gibson about Mexicans", referencing the incident when Gibson ranted and yelled anti-Semitic slurs, along with Rickles' history of making jokes about every race and religious group he can come up with but remaining funny and popular anyway.

The memory of Homer's first kiss, which he destroys, is from the Season 15 episode "The Way We Weren't".

The scene where Homer is standing on a bridge, ready to jump off, is a reference to the film It's a Wonderful Life. The scene where Moe tells Homer that he spits in his drinks, just before Homer drinks the "Forget-Me-Shot", copies a similar scene in the film Memento. The episode also vaguely references the film The Game at various points in the episode, especially during the scene when Homer attempts to take his own life. The music playing at the end of the episode is a version of "Day After Day" by Badfinger. When Chief Wiggum asks Homer if he knows who Jack the Ripper was, he answers Queen Victoria's personal doctor. In the chalkboard gag, Bart makes a reference to the hit Disney show Hannah Montana when he's writing "The Capital of Montana is not Hannah".

== Reception ==
In its original American broadcast, "Eternal Moonshine of the Simpson Mind" was viewed by an estimated 10.15 million households, won in its time slot, and received a 4.8 rating/12 audience share.

Robert Canning of IGN enjoyed the episode, saying it "did both very well by putting Homer in his own head as he tried to recall the events that transpired the previous day. Smart, funny and visually engaging, this episode was an absolute pleasure to watch." He gave it an 8.8/10 rating, and cited it as the season's high point. TV Squad's Richard Keller wrote that "by far, this was the most interesting episode of [the nineteenth season], incorporating humor, romance, and a little bit of science fiction into a tidy little plot. [...] True, it was another Homer-centric episode – one of too many this season, but the writers gave the show enough of a twist to keep it intriguing for the viewer." In another IGN article, Robert Canning, Eric Goldman, Dan Iverson, and Brian Zoromski named "Eternal Moonshine of the Simpson Mind" the best episode of the season, with the rationale that "it's the episode's fantastic visuals that truly make this a memorable episode." In 2012, Matt Zoller Seitz of New York magazine deemed "Eternal Moonshine of the Simpson Mind" one of nine later Simpsons episodes that was as good as the show's classic era. Screen Rant called it the best episode of the 19th season.

At the 2008 Primetime Emmy Awards, the episode won the award for Outstanding Animated Program (for Programming Less Than One Hour) with Jess Española becoming the first Filipino to win a Primetime Emmy.
