= Love, Springfieldian Style =

- The Simpsons episode
- Promotional poster
- Episode no.: Season 19; Episode 12
- Directed by: Raymond S. Persi
- Written by: Don Payne
- Production code: KABF05
- Original air date: February 17, 2008

Episode features
- Couch gag: Each family member rushes into the living room and attaches themselves to a giant-size baby mobile.
- Commentary: Matt Groening; Al Jean; Matt Selman; Tim Long; Tom Gammill; Max Pross; Raymond S. Persi; Yeardley Smith

Episode chronology
← Previous "That '90s Show"	Next → "The Debarted"
- The Simpsons season 19

"Love, Springfieldian Style" is the twelfth episode of the nineteenth season of the American animated television series The Simpsons. It first aired on the Fox network in the United States on February 17, 2008, three days after Valentine's Day. The episode was written by Don Payne and directed by Raymond S. Persi.

The episode includes three self-contained stories about romance. The three tales are parodies of Bonnie and Clyde, Lady and the Tramp and Sid and Nancy. The episode received mixed reviews.

== Plot ==
The episode begins on a Valentine's Day afternoon. As a Valentine's Day treat, Homer takes Marge to a carnival, where they leave the kids in order to spend the day with one another in the Tunnel of Love. Inside, the two enjoy each other's company; however, Bart attempts to spoil his parents' happiness by filling the water with Jell-O, causing Homer and Marge's boat to stop. Trapped, Homer decides to pass time by telling Marge the story of Bonnie and Clyde.

=== Bonnie and Clyde ===
In 1933, during the Great Depression, Bonnie Parker (Marge) rejects a man trying to get her attention (Cletus), saying she is looking for someone exciting. Clyde Barrow (Homer) then arrives, and after robbing a store (which he ironically co-owns with his father), the two run off. Clyde discovers Bonnie's passion is violence, and the two go on a crime spree by robbing banks.

After tricking a citizen (Flanders) into helping them, the two garner intense popularity across the country. The citizen they tricked soon realizes what had happened and betrays them to the police after learning they are an unmarried couple. The Texas officers soon arrive, and the police gun Bonnie and Clyde down. While being shot, Bonnie tells Clyde that she is looking for a man with more excitement, and that they would never have been together.

Back at the Tunnel of love, Bart and Lisa arrive at Homer and Marge's boat and want them to tell a child-friendly story. Marge tells the story of Shady and the Vamp.

=== Shady and the Vamp ===
Vamp (Marge) is a royal and luxurious female dog. Shady (Homer) is in love with Vamp and eyes her from a distance, vowing that he will win her. After Shady is trampled by a mob of children, Vamp comforts him, and he asks her out for dinner. The two go to Luigi's, where, after a romantic pasta dinner (Except for the part were Shady nearly swallows Vamp over a string of spaghetti), the two run off onto a hill when the health inspector comes. In the morning, Vamp wakes up with nauseous feelings, and Shady leaves her, claiming that a fox hunter is near, knowing she is actually pregnant.

In a musical number entitled "Any Minute Now" (featuring canine versions of Lenny, Carl and Barney backing up for Shady), the two dogs await for one another's return, though the cats living with a now-pregnant Vamp (Patty and Selma) convince her that Shady would never come back, whilst the dog who is friends with Shady (Moe) convinces him that he should stay with them rather than be "stuck" with Vamp and their puppies. Two of her puppies (Bart and Lisa) decide to go look for their father, and after being kidnapped by the dog catcher (Groundskeeper Willie), Shady arrives to save his children. Shady returns them home and reunites with Vamp, choosing to stay with her, but then Vamp informs Shady that there were actually nine other puppies in the litter (all of whom resemble Bart and Lisa with the exception of one, who resembles Maggie).

When Homer eventually gets bored with Marge's story, Bart tells the story of Sid and Nancy.

=== Sid and Nancy ===
Nancy Spungen (Lisa), a young model student, walks into a rock concert by the Sex Pistols with her friend Milhouse, where she is enamored by the eccentric bassist, Sid Vicious (Nelson). After viewing him throw his bass at a fan at his concert, she decides to go after him. A chocolate dealer (Otto), who is in fact an undercover policeman and arrests Nancy's friend shortly afterwards, sells her a chocolate bar which she gives to Sid, who soon begins dating her. As shown in a montage, the two begin having their lives spiraled out of control while gaining a chocolate addiction. Sid soon begins ditching the Sex Pistols, angering lead singer Johnny Rotten (Bart) and guitarist Steve Jones (Jimbo).

Sid arrives in the middle of a performance after a major chocolate spree, and knocks into an amplifier which topples over and crushes their drummer, Paul Cook (Dolph). Nancy arrives to defend Sid, and informs the Pistols that Sid does not need them, and the two go off trying to sing a soft type of music, performing at CBGB (Comic Book Guy's Bar). When they are kicked out for playing music against everything that punk rock represents (which, according to the Comic Book Guy, is nothing), the two decide to go back to their addiction and kiss in the alley as garbage (emptied by Homer) rains down on them. Homer wishes everyone a Happy Valentine's Day and to "shut your gob."

== Cultural references ==
- The title of the episode is a take-off of Love, American Style.
- The song played at the beginning of the episode is "L-O-V-E" by Nat King Cole.
- In the Bonnie and Clyde segment, the radio actors performing "The Bonnie and Clyde Hour" are drawn to resemble George Burns and Gracie Allen. The "Robby Robin" character is a parody of Woody Woodpecker.
- The "Shady and the Vamp" segment refers to the 1955 Disney movie Lady and the Tramp. The whole segment is uniquely animated in the painted art style that is reminiscent of Disney features. Coincidentally, "Homer" was another name considered for the character of Tramp.
- The dog Groundskeeper Willie takes into the gas chamber is based on Disney's character, Goofy.
- The final segment is a reference to the romance of Sid Vicious and Nancy Spungen and the film Sid and Nancy. CBGB was a real music bar that is now closed (though in the episode it stands for Comic Book Guy's Bar). Several punk icons, (Captain Sensible and Dave Vanian of The Damned) are also seen in the bar.
- In the Bonnie and Clyde segment, when rebuffing Cletus, Marge says, "This is Texas, the future home of Hakeem Olajuwon", who would be famous in the 1990s playing for Texas-based NBA team Houston Rockets.
- In the Sid and Nancy segment, when at the bar, the song that the Sex Pistols (Bart, Nelson, Jimbo - playing guitarist Steve Jones - and Dolph playing drummer Paul Cook) are listening to is "Neat Neat Neat" by The Damned, until Martin changes the jukebox song to "Saturday Night" by the Bay City Rollers (prompting punishment by the bullies).
- The song played during the drug/chocolate montage is "Ever Fallen in Love?" by The Buzzcocks.
- When one of the punks in the CBGB crowd comments that Sid and Nancy's song does not make him feel angry, but instead makes him feel his anger ebb; his mohawk goes down into an emo-style fringe.
- The song played at the end (transition to the credits) is a parody of "Taxi to Heaven" from the movie Sid and Nancy, originally performed by Pray for Rain.

== Censorship ==
This episode was first broadcast in the UK and Ireland on Sky1 on December 21, 2008 at 9.30pm. It was the second episode of The Simpsons to be broadcast after the watershed hour (after "Weekend at Burnsie's") because the adult content was deemed too strong to be shown before then. The Bonnie and Clyde story ends with Homer and Marge being shot multiple times, though they do not bleed or die. The Sid and Nancy story includes repeated use of the word "bollocks" by Bart as he sings, as well as depictions of Nelson and Lisa buying and consuming chocolate as if it were an illegal substance.

It has since been repeated on Channel 4, where it was heavily edited. The Bonnie and Clyde section ends just as the police begin firing at the car, missing Bonnie's final comments to Clyde. The Shady and the Vamp section cuts the scene where the Goofy-like character enters the gas chamber, although he is seen in the dog pound. The Sid and Nancy section was also edited in a way that was similar to the edits in the Sky1 broadcast.

== Reception ==
The episode earned a 2.7 rating and was watched by 7.77 million viewers, which was the 34th most-watched show that week.

Robert Canning of IGN gave the episode a 5.5 out of 10. He thought that Bonnie and Clyde parodies have been done before, and the Lady and the Tramp story unfolded as expected. He liked the final story the most with the use of chocolate instead of drugs and the jokes with Otto and Comic Book Guy.

Richard Keller of TV Squad enjoyed the episode. He said that, "This time around they seemed to focus on the stories themselves rather than overload them with gags as they tend to do. The result were some pretty nice stories." His favorite was the second story.
