= He Loves to Fly and He D'ohs =

- The Simpsons episode
- A promotional image featuring Lionel Richie, Homer, Marge and Colby Kraus
- Episode no.: Season 19; Episode 1
- Directed by: Mark Kirkland
- Written by: Joel H. Cohen
- Production code: JABF20
- Original air date: September 23, 2007

Guest appearances
- Stephen Colbert as Colby Kraus; Lionel Richie as himself

Episode features
- Chalkboard gag: "I will not wait 20 years to make another movie"
- Couch gag: Plopper the pig is sitting on the couch; the family rushes in as the "Spider-pig" theme plays in the background. Homer holds him and says "My summer love".
- Commentary: Al Jean; Joel H. Cohen; Matt Selman; Tom Gammill; Max Pross; David Silverman; Ralph Sosa; Mike B. Anderson

Episode chronology
← Previous "You Kent Always Say What You Want"	Next → "The Homer of Seville"
- The Simpsons season 19

"He Loves to Fly and He D'ohs", also known as "He Loves to Fly", is the nineteenth season premiere of the American animated television series The Simpsons. It was the first episode to air after the release of The Simpsons Movie, having originally aired on the Fox network in the United States on September 23, 2007. In the episode, Homer falls in love with private planes after taking a flight to Chicago with Mr. Burns. He tries to find a job that involves flying in a corporate jet, and hires a life coach named Colby Kraus to assist him with his goal.

The episode was written by Joel H. Cohen and directed by Mark Kirkland, while Lionel Richie guest stars as himself and Stephen Colbert guests as the voice of Colby Kraus.

"He Loves to Fly" was the last episode to use an alternate opening sequence and the last episode to feature an opening of characters without shadows, until "To Surveil with Love" in 2010. Following its broadcast, the episode received mixed reviews from television critics.

== Plot ==
Both the episode and season take place two months after the events of the movie and the rebuild of Springfield. During a visit to the Springfield Mall, Mr. Burns falls into a fountain while trying to take a penny from it. Homer arrives to pull him out, saving his life. Burns offers to take Homer out to dinner as a reward; when Homer expresses a liking for Chicago-style pizza, the two fly to Chicago in Burns' luxuriously appointed private plane. Homer enjoys the trip and the dinner, but soon becomes depressed because he does not have a plane of his own.

To raise Homer's spirits, Marge hires life coach Colby Kraus to work with him. Colby discovers that Homer is only good at bowling and urges him to wear his bowling shoes everywhere in order to boost his self-confidence. The strategy succeeds, and a revitalized Homer soon receives job interview invitations from several companies. He decides to interview only at Handyman's Choice, a copper tubing manufacturer, because the position would require him to take business trips on the company jet.

In the days following the interview, Homer confidently leaves the house each morning, but drives past Handyman's Choice and spends the day at a nearby Krusty Burger. Bart finds him there during a class field trip, and Homer admits that he did not get the job because he knows nothing about copper tubing and manhandled the CEO in an attempt to hire him. Bart urges Homer to tell Marge the truth, but upon hearing her happy voice on the phone, Homer cannot bring himself to disappoint her. Instead, he charters a brief private jet flight for himself and Marge, intending to tell her the truth during the trip. Before he can do so, though, the plane hits turbulence and Homer and Marge find the pilot passed out from heroin use. They struggle to pull the plane up and keep from crashing into the ocean, and Marge frantically calls Colby for advice. His motivation guides Homer to land the plane safely at the airport, but Homer accidentally steers it into the ocean while trying to taxi back to the terminal. He and Marge are airlifted to safety, and he decides to go back to work at the power plant, seeing private jet travel as dangerous.

== Production ==
A panorama of the callback.

This was the first new episode to air following the release of The Simpsons Movie, and the episode's opening sequence is a callback to the film. Bart writes "I will not wait 20 years to make another movie" on the chalkboard and skateboards through Springfield, which is still recovering from the dome incident. Several movie characters reappear, including President Schwarzenegger, the Multi-Eyed Squirrel, Colin, Russ Cargill, and the Medicine Woman. The Simpsons' new house is still under construction, and the silo Homer used to store feces from his pig, Plopper, is strapped to his car. Plopper is also featured for the first time in the series, during the couch gag, and Homer refers to him as "my summer love."

=== Casting ===
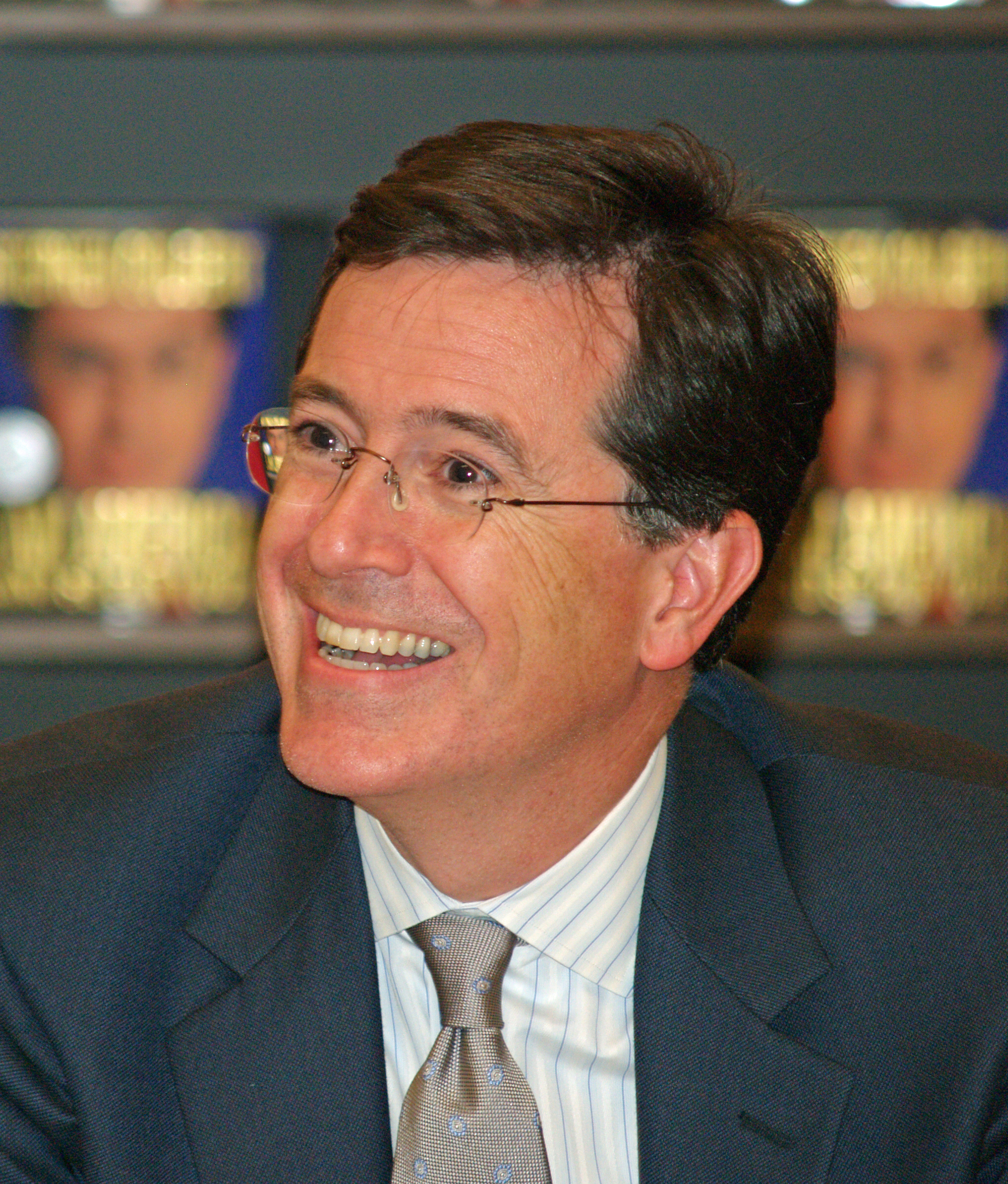
Stephen Colbert (pictured) based his performance on Tony Robbins.

When asked to appear on the show, Stephen Colbert believed that he was merely going to an audition, but was "thrilled" when the production staff told him he actually had a part in the episode. Colbert was pleased that his character was named Colby and that his appearance was similar to that of his own, although he had not expected the animators to retain his glasses for the design. He based his performance on Tony Robbins, and described the recording sessions as "the hardest job."

== Cultural references ==
While in Chicago, Mr. Burns and Homer walk into a salon called "Ferris Bueller's Day of Beauty" in a reference to Ferris Bueller's Day Off. When they exit the salon, they are dressed as Ferris (Burns) and his friend Cameron (Homer), respectively. Lionel Richie sings "Say You, Say Me" on the flight. He makes it about beer at Homer's requests. The two titles, when changed, are "Hey You, Beer Me" and "Beer Beer, Beer Beer," the latter of which Homer forgets the words to. Mr. Burns and Homer catch a show at the real-life Second City Theater. Both Dan Castellaneta and guest star Stephen Colbert were members of Second City early in their careers. The episode's title is a reference to Delta Air Lines' 1987 slogan, "We love to fly, and it shows."

== Reception ==
The episode averaged 9.7 million viewers and a 4.7 overnight Nielsen rating and a 12 percent audience share. The episode had the highest demo ratings of any Simpsons episode since "The Wife Aquatic", which aired January 7, 2007.

Brian Tallerico of UGO gave the episode a C (a mixed review), expressing disappointment after the well received The Simpsons Movie. He felt the writers went "right back to their old clichés and sadly repetitive jokes", though praised the altered opening sequence.

Robert Canning of IGN also gave the episode 5/10, praising the opening sequence but found most of the episode mediocre, especially Stephen Colbert's appearance. Nonetheless, "even a mediocre episode will have a few comic gems hidden inside. The time spent in Chicago is quite enjoyable, including a great Ferris Bueller sight gag, and life coach Colby delivers a zinger of a line comparing Homer's attitude to that of the United States of America."

Richard Keller of TV Squad praised the episode, saying "after watching so many recent ones where Homer seemed like a barely functioning mental patient, I wasn't used to a Homer that was actually fairly normal." Al Jean, the current executive producer of The Simpsons, has called the episode one of his personal favorites.

Prefix Mag's Andrew Martin named Lionel Richie his ninth favorite musical guest on The Simpsons out of a list of ten.
