= E Pluribus Wiggum =

- The Simpsons episode
- Episode no.: Season 19; Episode 10
- Directed by: Mike Frank Polcino
- Written by: Michael Price
- Production code: KABF03
- Original air date: January 6, 2008

Guest appearances
- Dan Rather as himself; Jon Stewart as himself

Episode features
- Chalkboard gag: "Teacher did not pay too much for her condo"
- Couch gag: A parody of the medieval Bayeux Tapestry shows Ned Flanders and his family stealing the Simpsons' couch. The Simpsons then take it back and kill the Flanders.
- Commentary: Matt Groening; Al Jean; Michael Price; Carolyn Omine; Tom Gammill; Max Pross; Mike Frank Polcino; David Silverman

Episode chronology
← Previous "Eternal Moonshine of the Simpson Mind"	Next → "That '90s Show"
- The Simpsons season 19

"E Pluribus Wiggum" is the tenth episode of the nineteenth season of the American animated television series The Simpsons. It first aired on the Fox network in the United States on January 6, 2008. It was written by Michael Price and directed by Mike Frank Polcino, and it guest starred Jon Stewart and Dan Rather as themselves.

In the episode, Homer Simpson's inadvertent destruction of Springfield's fast-food district leads to the town holding the first presidential primaries for 2008 to fund reconstruction, attracting politicians and political journalists from across the country. Having eventually grown weary of the influx, Springfieldians attempt to drive the newcomers out by electing the most ridiculous candidate possible, the general choice ultimately being local second-grader Ralph Wiggum.

The episode became controversial in Argentina for a joke made about the government of late former dictator Juan Perón and was banned by the then sympathetic ruling government. Nonetheless, U.S. reviews were generally positive, and Michael Price was nominated for the Writers Guild of America Award in the animation category for writing the episode.

== Plot ==
Homer leaves work, and when he is reminded that his diet is starting on the first day of the month (which is that day), he decides to have one last binge at Springfield's Fast-Food Boulevard. After filling up, he decides to throw away his wrappers and the contents of his car in a drive-thru trash can outside of a Krusty Burger, tossing away a leaky battery and a lit match from a cigar. The acid from the leaky battery eats a hole in a gas main, with the lit match igniting the gas and starting a fire which soon causes nearby gas pipes to explode, completely destroying Fast-Food Boulevard.

At a town hall meeting, the enraged residents of Springfield demand that Fast-Food Boulevard be rebuilt immediately. To fund the reconstruction, a bond measure is proposed. As the next election is not until June the next year, Mayor Quimby moves it to the upcoming Tuesday, making Springfield's presidential primary the first in the nation. Candidates and reporters head to Springfield when they hear the news.

The candidates flock to the Simpsons, who are undecided. Their home is filled with people and their yard is covered with reporters; helicopters and news vans surround the lot. When voting day arrives, an angry Homer and other citizens hold a meeting in Moe's Tavern. Homer suggests the people vote for the most ridiculous candidate, whom they choose after Chief Wiggum suggests himself. The same night, Kent Brockman announces an unexpected turn of events: Springfield has rejected all the leading candidates and voted for 8-year-old Ralph Wiggum. He wins the primary, much to the shock of Lisa Simpson.

Ralph is immediately embraced as the leading candidate, and Homer and Bart become supporters. Lisa, however, is miserable, as she knows how slow Ralph is and questions whether he can run as he is too young to qualify for president. A news report (called Headbutt) shows Ralph has no idea of which party's nomination he is seeking. Both the Democratic and Republican parties contend to secure Ralph as their candidate. The leaders of both parties break into Ralph's home, wanting to fight for him. Lisa confronts Ralph amongst the media frenzy, attempting to convince him not to run. Ralph tells Lisa he wants to run so he can bring peace between warring parties and his earnest kindheartedness wins her support. He is proven to be a formidable candidate, and both the Republicans and the Democrats support Ralph for president. The episode ends with a political commercial for Ralph, sponsored by both parties.

== Production ==
"E Pluribus Wiggum" was written by Michael Price. Price and his son came up with the episode's opening set piece during a drive in Palmdale, California. They stopped at a Burger King that had a long scoop on its trash can, for customers to throw away trash from their car. His son commented, "Homer would love that – he's so lazy." This led to the creation of the Fast-Food Boulevard, with Price's son suggesting the name. In the episode, when Homer destroys Fast-Food Boulevard, a restaurant named "Vesuvius Pizza" is shown exploding, with pizza sauce coming out of its top like lava. This joke was pitched by Price's son, who had been learning about volcanoes in school.

== Cultural references ==
- The title is a reference to E pluribus unum ("Out of Many, One"), the Latin phrase that appears on United States coins and currency.
- Cheesy McMayor is a parody of McDonald's Mayor McCheese.
- Former President Bill Clinton is seen putting up campaign signs for his wife, Senator Hillary Clinton. Later, in the commercial for Ralph, Bill announces his support for him, adding "but don't tell you-know-who".
- Arianna Huffington and George Will are parodied as guests on the fictional talk show HeadButt. Later, the Huffington character meets with the Springfield Democratic Party and reveals that the flamboyantly gay Julio is her ex-husband—a dig at Mike Huffington, who revealed he was gay after divorcing Arianna.
- Three restaurant chains are referenced throughout the episode: Trader Joe's (parodied as Trader Earth's), Red Lobster (parodied as Dead Lobster) and KFC (parodied as Kentucky Fried Panda).
- Dan Rather's utterance of "Sweet mother of Murrow!" refers to Ethel Lamb Murrow, the mother of prominent television and radio reporter Edward R. Murrow.
- The fictional brand of the cigars Homer smokes is "Jerk-Ass Homer Cigars," a reference to a term coined by Simpsons fans to describe Homer's personality change during Mike Scully's showrunner era when Homer became meaner and less sympathetic about others. This joke was pitched by Al Jean.
- Mr. Burns says that George W. Bush fairly won election in 2004, then adds somewhat sheepishly, "Assuming they don't find those ballot boxes in Ohio". This refers to the 2004 presidential election, in which Ohio's electoral results were challenged in Congress. Also Burns ignoring Bush's victory in the 2000 election refers to the Florida recount and the belief that Bush did not win "fairly" in the first time.
- When the New Hampshire woman decides to shoot the cashier after her husband carelessly says her name, this is a reference to Once Upon a Time in the West.

== Reception ==
=== Viewing figures ===
An estimated 8.2 million people tuned into the episode.

=== Critical response ===
Richard Keller of TV Squad said that it was an episode with many jokes and sight gags, his favorite being the episode's guest stars and the many references. His only disagreement was the abrupt ending.

Robert Canning of IGN said the episode had all the ingredients that seem to make it a classic episode. He enjoyed the theme of Homer and Fast-Food Boulevard, the political mocking, and the centering of Ralph, and like Keller, he felt the show seemed to shun Ralph until the end; he gives the episode a rating of 6/10.

Five days after the episode was broadcast, Dan Snierson of Entertainment Weekly reveals that it received positive reviews from the site, and Ralph Wiggum had their vote.

=== Awards and nominations ===
Writer Michael Price was nominated for the Writers Guild of America Award for Television: Animation his script for this episode at the 61st Writers Guild of America Awards.

=== Controversy ===
The episode caused controversy prior to its broadcast in Argentina, over an exchange between Lenny and Carl. Carl says "I could really go for some kind of military dictator, like Juan Perón. When he 'disappeared' you, you stayed 'disappeared'!". Carl's comment is a reference to the National Reorganization Process, a period of military dictatorship (1976–1983) during Dirty War in which as many as 30,000 Argentines disappeared, and is largely regarded as having begun during Perón's last government with the Triple A, a death squad which killed many left-wing dissidents. However, these disappearances occurred systematically during the military dictatorship, which began almost two years after Peron's death. The clip was viewed on YouTube over ten thousand times in Argentina and some politicians in the country called for the episode to be censored or banned.

Lorenzo Pepe, former Argentinian congressman and president of the Juan Domingo Perón Institute said "this type of program causes great harm, because the disappearances are still an open wound here." Some reacted negatively to Lenny's response to Carl's comment: "Plus, his wife was Madonna", a reference to the film Evita where Madonna played Eva Perón. Pepe added "the part about Madonna—that was too much." Pepe's request for banning the episode was rejected by the Federal Broadcasting Committee of Argentina on freedom of speech grounds.

In an unprecedented decision, Fox decided not to air the episode in Hispanic America. In an e-mail sent later to the media, the network said that this decision was based on "the possibility that the episode would contribute to reopen wounds very painful to Argentina". The Federal Broadcasting Committee made it clear that the episode was not aired in Argentina by Fox's own choice.
