= Funeral for a Fiend =

- The Simpsons episode
- Sideshow Bob's "funeral" with his brother Cecil, their father and Krusty the Clown.
- Episode no.: Season 19; Episode 8
- Directed by: Rob Oliver
- Written by: Michael Price
- Production code: KABF01
- Original air date: November 25, 2007

Guest appearances
- Kelsey Grammer as Sideshow Bob; David Hyde Pierce as Cecil Terwilliger; John Mahoney as Doctor Robert Terwilliger Sr.; Keith Olbermann as himself

Episode features
- Couch gag: A magician walks into the empty living room and uses his cape to make the couch and the Simpsons appear from thin air.
- Commentary: Matt Groening; Al Jean; Michael Price; Matt Selman; Tom Gammill; Max Pross; David Silverman

Episode chronology
| ← Previous "Husbands and Knives" | Next → "Eternal Moonshine of the Simpson Mind" |
- The Simpsons season 19

"Funeral for a Fiend" is the eighth episode of the nineteenth season of the American animated television series The Simpsons. It first aired on the Fox network in the United States on November 25, 2007. This episode was written by Michael Price and was directed by Rob Oliver. Serving as a stand-alone sequel to "The Italian Bob", the episode features Kelsey Grammer in his tenth appearance as Sideshow Bob and David Hyde Pierce in his second appearance as his brother, Cecil. John Mahoney makes his sole appearance as the Terwilligers' patriarch, Doctor Robert Terwilliger Sr., whereas Keith Olbermann additionally makes a guest appearance as himself.

== Plot ==
The Simpsons see a commercial for a new restaurant called "Wes Doobner's World Famous Family Style Rib Huts", owned by a cowboy of the same name and perfectly suited to each member of the family. They decide to visit it for its grand opening, but discover Doobner is actually Sideshow Bob, having fled Italy alongside his wife and son, Francesca and Gino, and created the restaurant and its commercial to lure the Simpsons into a trap. After tying up the Simpsons, Bob then reveals a stack of dynamite-filled crates, with which he will kill them via a laptop with a defective battery as a detonator once it overheats and explodes. While gloating, Bob incorrectly quotes a phrase from Macbeth and Lisa corrects him. Bob tries to look up the correct phrase on Wikipedia, but the laptop explodes in Bob's hands and he is then arrested and taken to court.

During Bob's trial, his family's patriarch, Doctor Robert Terwilliger Sr., is brought to testify. He explains Bob has a rare heart condition and additionally suggests that Bob is troubled because of his long-standing feud with Bart. Since all of Springfield has been tormented by Bart's wrongdoings, they are all convinced that he is ultimately to blame and turn on him. As Bart pleads his innocence, Bob takes out a vial of nitroglycerin, which everyone thinks is a deadly explosive. However, as Bart throws the vial away to save everyone, it is revealed to actually be for Bob's heart medication as he collapses to the floor and is pronounced dead.

Bob's entire family attends his funeral, including its matriarch, well-known Shakespearean actress Dame Judith Onderdonk, and Bob's brother Cecil, who has been let out of prison for the occasion, alongside many regular Springfieldians. Feeling slightly guilty, Bart speaks to Cecil, who convinces him to go to the funeral home to make peace with Bob before he is cremated. However, when Bart arrives, Bob rises out of the coffin, alive and well, and traps him in it to be incinerated.

Meanwhile, Milhouse inadvertently makes Lisa realize that the previous events were an elaborate plot put together by Bob and his family – with his mother being a Shakespearean actress, Bob would have known Shakespeare too well to have accidentally made a misquotation and must have done so intentionally in order to get caught and go to trial, where his father would use a special drug to put him in a death-like state. Cecil helped by playing to Bart's guilty conscience and encouraging him to visit Bob, luring Bart into the villain's clutches once again. The Simpsons race to the funeral home and just barely manage to save Bart in time as the police then arrive and arrest the Terwilligers. Defeated but curious, Bob questions Lisa on how she was able to figure out his plot – she became suspicious when she noticed that his coffin had been custom-made to fit his feet and acknowledges that his family likely would not have bothered paying for something like that if he actually died. The Terwilligers are then incarcerated with Bob's cellmate, Snake Jailbird, who constantly torments them while their son goes insane over fantasizing about avenging himself one day.

== Production ==
The scene where Homer prevents Marge from getting Bart out of the coffin and telling her, "He has got to get over his fear of coffins," is derived from the opening scene from "Tennis the Menace" where Bart gets trapped in a coffin and starts to panic. Homer watches him panic on a closed circuit television set. The joke was written for The Simpsons Movie, in a scene that was cut from the final release of the movie, and reused here.

John Mahoney is the third Frasier cast member to play a member of the Terwilliger family, after Kelsey Grammer and David Hyde Pierce, his on-screen sons in both series.

The song Krusty sings at Bob's "funeral" is a take-off on "Candle in the Wind" by Elton John. The title of the episode is additionally an allusion to another one of John's song, "Funeral for a Friend (Love Lies Bleeding)", the preceding song to "Candle in the Wind" on his album Goodbye Yellow Brick Road.

The Terwilligers seal Bart in Bob's spacious coffin and attempt to incinerate him in the cremation furnace a la Mr. Wint and Mr. Kidd doing the same to James Bond in the film adaptation of Diamonds Are Forever.

== Reception ==
An estimated 9.0 million viewers tuned into the episode.

Robert Canning of IGN gave the episode a 6.2/10, saying, "There were some enjoyable scenes, but the half hour lacked in the number of laugh-out-loud moments, and Bob's ultimate scheme wasn't very surprising." The website later placed the episode at #9 on the list of "the Top 10 Sideshow Bob Episodes", with Canning stating that it "returned Bob to his path of vengeance, and that's really the only factor that pushes this episode above its predecessor. Even with a return to what we know, this is still one of the weakest Sideshow Bob episodes. One major aspect of this episode is that it reunited the Crane family from Frasier. [...] While this could have been comedy gold, The Simpsons wasted the opportunity. Instead of keeping the familiar dynamics these actors had shared before (a tactic that worked extremely well in Cecil's first appearance), the series took a different route, making Mahoney's father character just as uppity and snobbish as his animated sons. Add an excessively elaborate, unfunny plot to kill Bart and ‘Funeral for a Fiend’ failed to capture any of the early seasons' Sideshow Bob magic."

Richard Keller of AOL TV said, "While Pierce and Mahoney did have their moments it was all Grammer this episode as a Sideshow Bob coming apart at the seams." He went on to say, "For the most part this week's episode was entertaining. Plus, it also brought a bit of continuity into the show, something that comes and goes on the program."

Genevieve Koski of The A.V. Club gave the episode a B+, praising the appearance of Pierce and Mahoney as Cecil and Doctor Terwilliger post-Fraiser, but criticized the TiVo storyline during its first act and wondered "if Lisa's recap of Sideshow Bob's plot was meant to be an homage to "Black Widower", when Bart recapped Bob's plan to kill Selma. If it was, it was half-assed; if it wasn't, it was a pleasant bit of unintentional nostalgia."
