= To Surveil with Love =

- The Simpsons episode
- Episode no.: Season 21; Episode 20
- Directed by: Lance Kramer
- Written by: Michael Nobori
- Production code: MABF12
- Original air date: May 2, 2010

Guest appearances
- Eddie Izzard as Nigel Bakerbutcher; Marcia Wallace as Edna Krabappel

Episode features
- Couch gag: The cast does a lip dub to Kesha's "Tik Tok."
- Commentary: Matt Groening: Al Jean; Matt Selman; Tom Gammill; Yeardley Smith

Episode chronology
← Previous "The Squirt and the Whale"	Next → "Moe Letter Blues"
- The Simpsons season 21

"To Surveil with Love" is the twentieth episode of the twenty-first season of the American animated television series The Simpsons. It premiered on the Fox network in the United States on May 2, 2010, as the 461st episode of the whole series. In this episode, radiation seeps out of Homer's gym bag after a bomb squad blows it up and Springfield officials decide to suspend all civil liberties. Meanwhile, Lisa dyes her hair after being stereotyped for being blonde. The episode's title is a pun on To Sir, with Love (1967), starring Sidney Poitier.

The episode was written by Michael Nobori and directed by Lance Kramer and guest stars Eddie Izzard. It also featured a new sequence with Kesha's single "Tik Tok" as the theme song, replacing the whole opening sequence as part of "Fox Rocks Week" for which Fox shows were encouraged to incorporate music into programming. This is the first episode of The Simpsons where the title "The Simpsons" is not shown, the first episode to use an alternate opening sequence and the first episode to feature opening of characters without shadows, for the first time since "He Loves to Fly and He D'ohs" in 2007. The episode was praised by critics for its storyline and satire of surveillance and conformity, while Lisa's subplot was criticized. The episode also received a 2.7/8 in the 18–49 Nielsen Rating demographic going down one-tenth from the previous episode "The Squirt and the Whale."

== Plot ==
When Mr. Burns is informed that the Nuclear Power Plant has run out of room to store waste plutonium, Smithers hides some of the radioactive matter in Homer's gym bag. Shortly afterwards, Homer goes to the train station and forgets the bag. The police see the bag as a threat and decide to detonate it, causing a nuclear explosion in the train station. The incident sparks fear of terrorism, and the town votes to hire British security consultant Nigel Bakerbutcher to install surveillance cameras all around Springfield. Soon the entire town is being watched, but when Chief Wiggum and the other police officers get tired of watching the surveillance screens, they recruit some of the townspeople—including Marge and Ned Flanders—to keep watch. Marge is not comfortable watching the activities of her fellow townspeople, but Ned discovers he enjoys being Springfield's "conscience" and proceeds to nag everyone through loudspeakers on the cameras, leaving the townspeople frustrated by Ned's constant nagging.

Bart discovers that the family's backyard contains a blind spot that none of the cameras can see, and he and Homer soon begin charging people to do whatever they want there. When Ned scolds Homer for allowing so many immoral activities to go on, Homer retorts that the situation is Ned's fault as he has abused his power and literally played God over the town, thus concentrating all their immorality into this one patch of grass. Ned apologises to the town for his interference, and he and Homer proceed to destroy all the cameras. It is then revealed that Bakerbutcher has been using the footage to put together a British reality television series called The American Oafs, which Queen Elizabeth II enjoys watching because Ralph Wiggum reminds her of her son, Prince Charles, who walks in and comments that his "cat's breath smells like cat food."

Lisa is invited to join the school debate team, but soon discovers that she faces prejudice from the brunette supremacist judges because she has blonde hair. This prejudice follows her during the town meeting when Cletus mocks her concerns over the freedom infringement. Marge's attempt to comfort her fails after buying a book, which did little to lift Lisa's spirits telling her to accept the stereotype. She hears Bart make comments against blondes even though Bart himself is blond. When she calls him out for being prejudiced against blondes, Bart defends himself by pointing out how the dumb blonde stereotype mostly just applies to women and girls, while men and boys with blond hair are expected to be evil and conniving rather than unintelligent. In a moment of kindness, Bart admits that he knows Lisa is the only exception to the blonde stereotype and encourages her to continue her fight against it.

Inspired by Bart's support, a newly determined Lisa dyes her hair dark brown. She deliberately presents a weak argument at the next debate meeting in favor of school uniforms and conformity. Nevertheless, she receives praise from the judges and earns the wrath of her rival, Megan, who realizes that because Lisa is now a brunette, she has leveled the playing field. Lisa is horrified when she learns the judges agreed with her simply because of her darker hair and not the strength of her debate skill. She points out their bias toward brunettes, prompting the only female judge on the panel to proudly admit her belief in the blonde stereotype. Lisa urges the audience not to blindly follow stereotypes as they all have exceptions, but her argument is immediately undermined when Grampa crashes his car through the wall of the school gymnasium where the debate is being held.

== Production ==
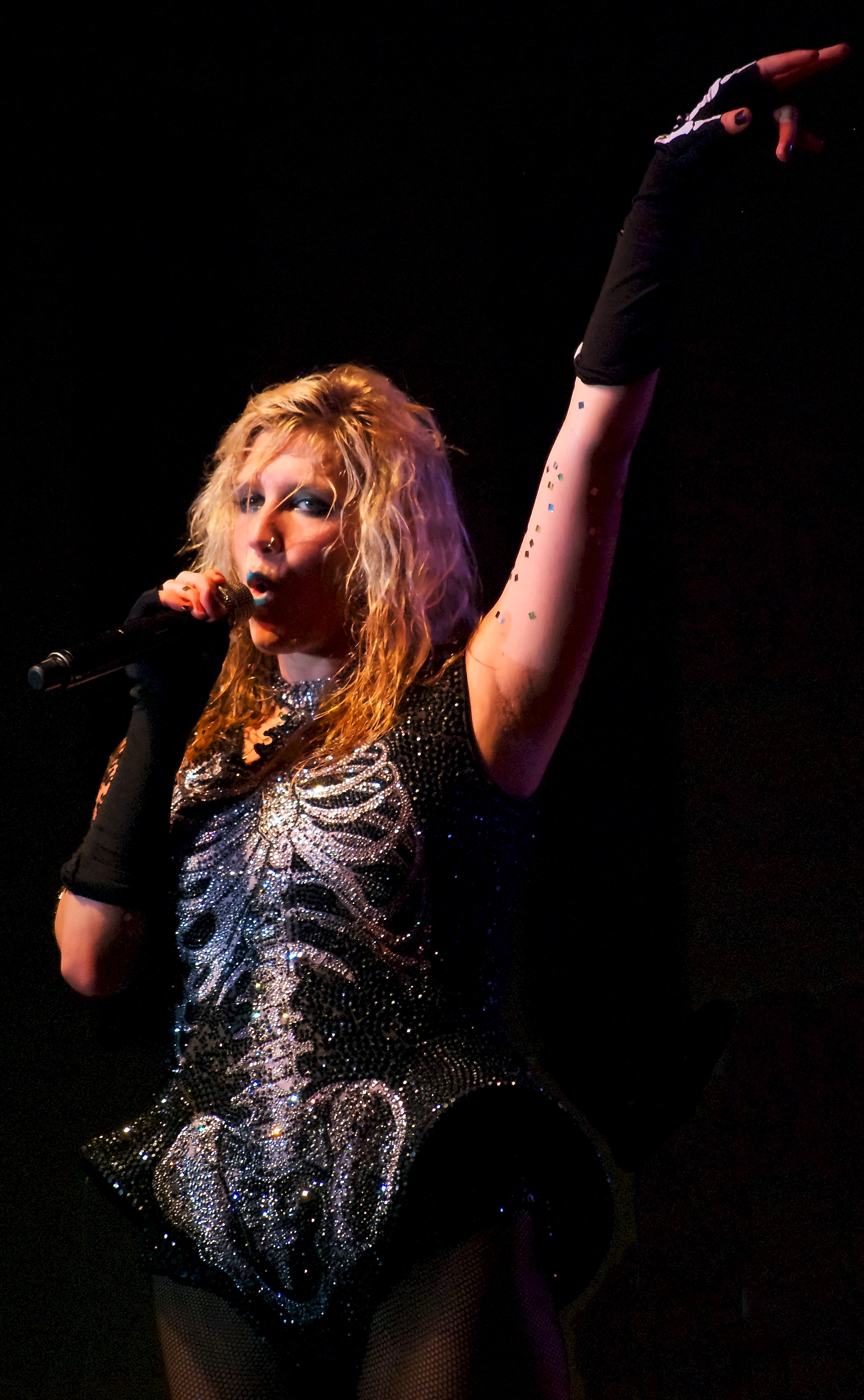
"Tik Tok" by Kesha was featured in the opening sequence of the episode.

The episode was written by Michael Nobori who served as a production assistant for seasons 20 and 21 and directed by Lance Kramer and guest stars Eddie Izzard performing impressions of Elizabeth II, Prince Charles and the character Nigel Bakerbutcher. In an effort to attract more viewers for May sweeps, Fox made a week full of musical segments in all the shows called Fox Rocks. For The Simpsons, they had a couch gag with the characters lip dubbing Kesha's song "Tik Tok" (P. Diddy vocals were replaced by Nancy Cartwright vocals as Bart Simpson saying the same Diddy lines). In an interview about the show, Izzard stated "I'd love to be in it, but they never asked me, and I don't want to push it. I think it's because I'm a cult – rather than a mainstream – name."

== Cultural references ==
In the scene where the surveillance cameras are being installed, a truck can be seen with the company name "Orwell Security," which is a reference to George Orwell's Nineteen Eighty-Four. Bart states that blond boys are not dumb, but "evil like in The Karate Kid or World War II," an allusion to Johnny Lawrence, of Cobra Kai. The gay bar features Sesame Street-like characters. The plutonium that is put in Homer's bag is stated to be powerful enough to create 17 Incredible Hulks and one Spider-Man. Also, Comic Book Guy says he is not jolly because San Diego Comic-Con might be moving to Anaheim.

== Reception ==
=== Viewing figures ===
In its original American broadcast, "To Surveil with Love" was viewed by an estimated 6.057 million viewers and an 18–49 Nielsen Rating of 2.7 and an 8 share coming second in its timeslot. The episode ranked 25th in the 18–49 Nielsen Ratings for the week the 7th top rated show on Fox in the demographic and 5th highest scripted show.

=== Critical response ===
The episode was met with highly positive reviews.

Robert Canning of IGN gave the episode 8/10 and remarked that "Overall, it was a fun episode, hurt only by the uninteresting filler of Lisa dealing with blonde stereotypes. But even that delivered its share of memorable quotes. If the past few episodes are any indication, this season may go out on a very high note."

TV Fanatic gave the episode 4/5 and stated "The Homer's backyard sequences felt reminiscent of the prior prohibition episode, but were still plenty of funny moments. While the actual plot was nothing too unique, we liked the ending with Flanders realizing he was playing God and the whole camera-setup being set up as a reality show in Britain."

Sharon Knolle of TV Squad stated "From the inspired 'Tik Tok' musical opening sequence to the last gag, 'To Surveil With Love' ranks as one of the best 'Simpsons' episodes in years. I never expected the rest of the episode to live up to that killer opening, but, unbelievably, it just got better as it went along."

Emily VanDerWerff of The A.V. Club gave the episode an A− and said "I thought this was a strong episode of The Simpsons. I laughed frequently throughout, I thought both of the major storylines mostly made sense and concluded well, and I enjoyed some of the ways the episode turned satire on its ear. I particularly liked the idea of Lisa conforming by becoming a brunette after everyone made fun of her for being a blonde. Dumb blonde jokes are as old as time itself, but the way the episode turned the whole thing into a sly parody of diversity and conformity was winning."

Ariel Ponywhether of Firefox News gave the episode an A, remarked that "the episode is one of the better outings of the season" and concluded "There were some very slight characterization flaws, which detract slightly from the grade, as does the well-written but underdeveloped Lisa subplot. Add in excellent voice-over work by Eddie Izzard to the mix, however, and you have a solid episode."
