= All About Lisa =

- The Simpsons episode
- The episode's promotional image featuring Krusty the Clown, Lisa, and Drew Carey.
- Episode no.: Season 19; Episode 20
- Directed by: Steven Dean Moore
- Written by: John Frink
- Production code: KABF13
- Original air date: May 18, 2008

Guest appearance
- Drew Carey as himself

Episode features
- Couch gag: The family is dragged onto a computer screen, then are put into the recycle bin which then gets emptied.
- Commentary: Al Jean; Matt Selman; Carolyn Omine; John Frink; Tom Gammill; Max Pross; Steven Dean Moore

Episode chronology
← Previous "Mona Leaves-a"	Next → "Sex, Pies and Idiot Scrapes"
- The Simpsons season 19

"All About Lisa" is the twentieth and final episode of the nineteenth season of the American animated television series The Simpsons. It originally aired on the Fox network in the United States on May 18, 2008. Lisa Simpson becomes Krusty the Clown's newest assistant and steals his spotlight. She wins Entertainer of the Year at the Springfield Media awards, but is warned that with her sudden fame comes a new attitude towards others and herself. Meanwhile, Homer and Bart bond over their newfound love of coin collecting. The episode features narration by Sideshow Mel. It was written by John Frink and directed by Steven Dean Moore. Drew Carey guest voices himself, appearing as a guest on Krusty's show.

== Plot ==
The episode begins at the 38th Annual Springfield Media Awards, where the Entertainer of the Year Award goes to Lisa Simpson. Sideshow Mel then explains how Lisa became an entertainer. At Krusty the Clown's 4,000th episode, Krusty decides to hire brand-new "Krustkateers", children who used to star alongside Krusty in his early episodes. Bart has the best performance of all the children auditioning, but Krusty chooses Nelson Muntz instead. Lisa decides to defend Bart and demands Krusty hire him. However, Krusty decides to hire Lisa as his intern instead. As Krusty's intern, Lisa is frequently bullied by Krusty. Noticing how Krusty degrades Lisa, Mel tells her that Krusty is very conceited, so in order to bear Krusty's rudeness, Lisa must compliment him. Lisa takes Sideshow Mel's advice, and a conceited Krusty finally praises Lisa's assistance.

When Krusty fails to entertain the audience at one of his shows, Lisa attempts to make Krusty look better. After pushing Krusty off the diving board, the entire audience laughs at Krusty and praises Lisa, whose mind is swept with fame and fortune. Krusty is warned by his agent that Lisa's popularity may steal his spotlight. One evening, Krusty is running late for a rehearsal, and the program directors offer Lisa the opportunity to fill in. Dressed in a clown outfit, she performs Krusty's monologue, then when Krusty finally arrives he finds out the network has hired Lisa to replace him, renaming the show "The Lisa Show". As Krusty is relegated to a local late-night talk show, Lisa becomes an overnight success, but Sideshow Mel warns Lisa not to overdo her pride.

The story returns to Lisa proudly accepting her award. After the awards show, Mel reveals to Lisa that he had previously won the Entertainer of the Year Award, and that past winners including himself had their careers killed because of the award by starring in mediocre TV shows and movies. Lisa realizes that she needs to get out of the business while she still can. She runs back out on stage and calls Krusty up, allowing him to be in the spotlight again. Krusty regains his reputation and his show, where he continues to torture Mel for comedy.

Meanwhile, Bart and Homer decide to sell all of Krusty's merchandise in Bart's room. When Comic Book Guy trades a coin album and a bicentennial quarter for the collection, Bart and Homer start coin collecting. After nearly filling the entire collection book, they discover a secret coin slot for the rare 1917 "Kissing Lincolns" penny. Bart and Homer head to a coin auction house in an attempt to buy the "Kissing Lincolns" penny, but Mr. Burns buys it instead for $10 million after Homer bids just $501. Burns does not willingly give Homer the penny, but Homer tricks him into giving it as part of change for a nickel.

== Cultural references ==
- The episode's title and plot as well as certain elements and scenes are references to the film All About Eve.
- The pig dressed in the suit is Spider Pig from 2007's The Simpsons Movie.
- The Krustkateers are a reference to the Mouseketeers from Disney's The Mickey Mouse Club.
- The comic book Radioactive Man vs. Muhammad Ali is a parody of the 1978 comic book Superman vs. Muhammad Ali.
- Last Gasp with Krusty the Clown is a reference to Last Call with Carson Daly.
- The dance Nelson practices for Krusty's show is a parody of the famous routine from Flashdance.

== Reception ==
In its original run, the episode was watched by 6.11 million viewers.

Since airing, the episode was met with mixed reviews. Robert Canning of IGN said the episode lacked the normal spark and was an average season finale. He also criticized the premise of the main plot for being identical to that of "Bart Gets Famous" and gave the episode a final score of 5.8 out of 10. Although he gave it a lackluster review, he said Homer's storyline, despite being a "time filler", had more laughs. James Greene of Nerve.com put the episode fourth on his list Ten Times The Simpsons Jumped the Shark, criticizing the similarities between the episode and "Bart Gets Famous" and stating that "It's inevitable any program will revisit plot lines twenty years in, but a complete rip of a classic outing is pretty rank." At the Springfield Showbiz Awards, the MC's quote, "We now come to our final award: Entertainer of the Year. An award so prestigious that it recently won the 'Award of the Year' Award at the 2007 Awardie Awards," was nominated for Best Quote of the Week.

John Frink received a Humanitas Award nomination for the script.
