= Dial 'N' for Nerder =

- The Simpsons episode
- Episode no.: Season 19; Episode 14
- Directed by: Bob Anderson
- Written by: Carolyn Omine; William Wright
- Production code: KABF07
- Original air date: March 9, 2008

Episode features
- Couch gag: Five pills, resembling each member of the Simpson family, are on the couch. Professor Frink puts a drop of water on each of them and they all grow to normal size, except Homer, who needs a bucket of water.
- Commentary: Al Jean; Carolyn Omine; Matt Selman; John Frink; Tom Gammill; Max Pross; Steven Dean Moore

Episode chronology
← Previous "The Debarted"	Next → "Smoke on the Daughter"
- The Simpsons season 19

"Dial 'N' for Nerder", also known as "N is for Nerder", is the fourteenth episode of the nineteenth season of the American animated television series The Simpsons. It originally aired on the Fox network in the United States on March 9, 2008. After a prank gone wrong, Bart and Lisa believe they have accidentally killed Bart's classmate Martin Prince. Meanwhile, Marge hires a TV show called Sneakers to spy on Homer and see if he is cheating on his diet. The episode was written by Carolyn Omine and William Wright and directed by Bob Anderson. During its first broadcast, the episode had an estimated 7.3 million viewers and received a 10 percent audience share.

== Plot ==
Homer and Marge are in bed about to have sexual intercourse, but Homer is too overweight to do so. The next day, Marge hires nutritionist Betsy Bidwell, who puts Homer on a strict diet consisting solely of bell peppers. Although Homer appears to stick to the diet, he gains seven pounds, and Marge suspects that he has been cheating. Later, while Bart and Lisa watch TV, Marge sees an advertisement for a television show named Sneakers, a parody of Cheaters designed for couples who are cheating on each other. Marge calls the Sneakers hotline to divulge her suspicions about Homer. When Homer leaves the house, claiming he is going to work on a Saturday, Marge calls some Sneakers agents to stalk Homer. They follow him to a motel, where they spot him amorously eating a rack of lamb. When the Sneakers agents catch a video of Homer going to a restaurant, Marge confirms her suspicions of Homer but realizes that the reality show people do not care about their marriage, and are trying to destroy it. She quits the show and embraces Homer, while the host decides to edit the episode to make Marge look crazy.

Bart and Lisa tour Springfield National Park. At the top of a mountain, the two discover Martin excavating for arrowheads. While Lisa joins him in excavating, a frustrated Bart plays a prank on Martin. Stealing Sideshow Mel's bone (revealing that he actually has long flowing hair), Bart buries it. Martin arrives thinking it is a real artifact. Bart tugs on a string connected to the bone, which flies up to knock Martin in the head. He stumbles over the edge of the cliff, and falls onto a smaller ledge. Lisa takes a long stick and tells him to grab onto it, but inadvertently knocks him off the ledge, and he falls into the trees at the bottom of the cliff. The two return home believing that they have killed Martin, and feel guilty and unsure what to do. On the news, Kent Brockman reports Martin has disappeared and is presumed dead. Chief Wiggum says when Martin landed he was eaten by a cougar. Bart, feeling guilty, wants to admit his crime to pay the price, but Lisa, frightened of going to jail for being an accomplice, convinces him to keep quiet.

During a memorial for Martin in the school gym, Nelson realizes that Martin had a fear of heights so it would be unusual for him to be at the top of a cliff. Nelson travels to Springfield National Park and discovers Sideshow Mel's bone on a string. He suspects Bart and Lisa's involvement in Martin's disappearance. Having read Martin's diary, Bart heads to Martin's greenhouse to complete his butterfly project. Lisa follows him and they finish the project. Just then, Martin's taped recording of a lute solo, set to go off as the butterflies hatch, automatically plays. Alarmed, Lisa hurriedly stops the tape, but the same lute tune begins to play again. The guilt becomes too unbearable for them and Lisa confesses to the murder out loud. Nelson appears, playing his lute, catches Lisa's confession on tape and is about to turn them into the police, just as Martin emerges. He recounts how he survived the fall thanks to his underwear with an extra-durable wedgie-proof waistband. His waistband caught on a tree branch and then the cougar pulled at his clothes, tossing him safely to an isle in the middle of a lake, where he spent an hour making a raft and three days making a modesty skirt. Though he punches Martin for prancing around in the skirt, Nelson is glad that he is alive, and tells Bart and Lisa he hopes that they learned their lesson. Lisa concludes that underneath her innocent appearance is a dark, twisted person, and Bart concurs that killing a nerd is not fun. Nelson then breaks the fourth wall to wish the show's audience a good night, and the ending imitates an opening to the NBC Mystery Movie, with Nelson Muntz as Columbo, Dr. Hibbert as Quincy, M.E., Rich Texan as McCloud, and Mr. Burns and Smithers as McMillan & Wife.

== Cultural references ==
The title for this episode is a take-off of Alfred Hitchcock's 1954 film Dial M for Murder. The TV show Marge hires is called Sneakers, a parody of the TV show Cheaters. There are two songs playing at Martin's memorial. The first one is "Gonna Fly Now", the theme from Rocky, played as a funeral march, the second one (during the slideshows with clips of Martin from previous episodes) is "I Will Remember You" by Sarah McLachlan. The scene where Bart and Lisa meet at the Kwik-E-Mart bears resemblance to a famous scene from Double Indemnity. Some scenes bear a similarity to Macbeth. The part where Lisa urges Bart to keep quiet about their involvement to Martin's death resembles Lady Macbeth convincing Macbeth to keep quiet about Duncan's murder. Lisa also states that she has a dark side, like Lady Macbeth. The restaurant which Homer goes to, "Pudding on the Ritz", is a parody of the song "Puttin' on the Ritz" by Irving Berlin. The scenery of Springfield National Park resembles the famous Half Dome of Yosemite National Park in California.

The piece played on the Sanyo cassette player and by Nelson inside Martin's butterfly chamber is "Prelude in C Minor for Lute (BWV 999)" by Johann Sebastian Bach (performed on guitar and transposed to D minor). When Martin explains how he survived in a flash back it shows him falling through trees in a way similar to the 2005 movie Hoodwinked!. The closing sequence duplicates the opening to the NBC Mystery Movie. Nelson's investigation of Martin's disappearance is a parody of the Columbo series.

== Reception ==
The episode was very positively received. The episode had an estimated 7.3 million viewers and received a 10 percent audience share.

Richard Keller of TV Squad said that it was "a pretty good episode". He felt that the "addition of Nelson as an investigator to the conspiracy was an interesting move on the producers' part", and that the Homer subplot was "entertaining and better than the rental car plot he had [in 'The Debarted']".

Robert Canning of IGN thoroughly enjoyed the episode, and gave it his second highest rating this season (8.5/10). He said the episode "was quite simply the best of the season. There wasn't one moment in the episode that didn't work." He went on to say that "while the diet cheating storyline was great silly fun, it was the turmoil that Bart and Lisa went through that really made this an outstanding episode." He concluded by saying that it was simply a fantastic episode.

Homer's quote, "Oh boy, dinner time! The perfect break between work and drunk" was included on Entertainment Weekly's list of the best quotes of the week.

== In Spain ==
Before the episode premiered in Spain, Antena 3 News and other media of that country announced the "death" of Martin Prince, causing the fans of the series in the country to use social networks to deliver the news before the episode was broadcast. Later, many Spaniards deleted those comments, along with pictures of Martin Prince with a black tie.
