= Husbands and Knives =

- The Simpsons episode
- The episode's promotional image, featuring Milo outside his new comic book store Coolsville.
- Episode no.: Season 19; Episode 7
- Directed by: Nancy Kruse
- Written by: Matt Selman
- Production code: JABF17
- Original air date: November 18, 2007

Guest appearances
- Jack Black as Milo; Daniel Clowes as himself; Maurice LaMarche as the jock; Alan Moore as himself; Art Spiegelman as himself; Sang Am Lee as a Korean singer

Episode features
- Chalkboard gag: "The Pilgrims were not illegal aliens"
- Couch gag: Two hands (with five fingers instead of four) open a pop-up book to reveal the family sitting on the couch.
- Commentary: Matt Groening; Al Jean; Matt Selman; Joel H. Cohen; Tom Gammill; Max Pross; David Silverman

Episode chronology
← Previous "Little Orphan Millie"	Next → "Funeral for a Fiend"
- The Simpsons season 19

"Husbands and Knives" is the seventh episode of the nineteenth season of the American animated television series The Simpsons. It first aired on the Fox network in the United States on November 18, 2007. The episode was written by Matt Selman and directed by Nancy Kruse.

In this episode, a new comic book store becomes popular in town leading Marge to convert the Android's Dungeon into a gym for women. It features guest appearances from Alan Moore, Art Spiegelman, and Dan Clowes as themselves and Jack Black as Milo. The title is a reference to the Woody Allen film Husbands and Wives. The episode received positive reviews.

== Plot ==
The Comic Book Guy charges Milhouse $25 for accidentally ruining a Wolverine comic book when one of his tears drops on its cover and smudges one of Wolverine's sideburns after being scratched by the comic's infamous "pop-out claws" feature at The Android's Dungeon. After Bart proclaims that the events in comic books are not "real", Comic Book Guy tells him and the other children to get out of the store, just as a new comic book store, "Coolsville Comics & Toys" opens across the street. When the children arrive at Coolsville, the store owner, a hipster named Milo, gives them Japanese candy and invites them to his grand opening. The store is filled not only with comic books, but also with video games and modern art, giving it a sophisticated arcade look. When Lisa accidentally rips a page of an Adventures of Tintin book, Milo assures her that the books are meant to be read and enjoyed.

The store becomes even more popular, playing host to Art Spiegelman, Daniel Clowes and Alan Moore, who all visit for a book signing. Comic Book Guy jealously tries to sabotage Milo's popularity by revealing he has a girlfriend (whom they have already accepted for she, like Milo, is hip) and bribing the children with "Japanese weapons". When this does not work, Comic Book Guy tries to use the weapons to destroy Coolsville, but is subdued by the three authors who remove their shirts to reveal muscular super-hero physiques.

After comparing herself to a cardboard cutout of Wonder Woman, Marge decides to become fitter. While exercising at a large gym, she struggles with the treadmill and is embarrassed showering in public, and as a result decides to open a gym for ordinary women.

Comic Book Guy, having finally given up, closes the Android's Dungeon which Marge then acquires in order to open "Shapes", a women-only workout center that is an immediate hit. Many women of Springfield comment on Marge's efforts; she opens another location at an abandoned Krusty Burger. After an interview on the women's television show Opal, Marge becomes an international hit. Homer and Marge go on a luxury vacation at a hotel. Homer meets a group of three strapping young men who tell him he is on "wife support". They are all "trophy" husbands and convince Homer that Marge will soon dump him for a healthier man. They list the stages that will occur in their marriage before Marge dumps him. As these begin to occur, Homer overhears Marge talking to a group of women about dumping her purse, though he wrongly assumes she is talking about him. One of the three younger men tells Homer he is actually a first husband who used to be fat and ugly, but transformed himself through fashion, diet and exercise. Homer, however, decides that he needs to get cosmetic surgery.

Homer attempts to win Marge back by having his stomach stapled. He is now much slimmer and has to liquify his food. Homer lures Marge into bed and turns her on, but has to make sure only his front is exposed as all of his excess skin is tied back behind him. Next, Homer gets extreme plastic surgery done. When finished, Homer looks entirely different; he is slim with well-defined musculature, narrower eyes, and a full head of black hair, and his tear ducts have been moved to his nipples among other things. At a ceremony in which Mayor Quimby rewards Marge for her work with Shapes, Homer arrives in his new form, much to the shock and disgust of the town. Homer and Marge run to the top of Springfield's Notre Dame tower to avoid the angry townspeople and Marge, saying she wants a trophy husband, deliberately pushes Homer off the tower. Homer wakes up in the hospital, back to his old self. Marge informs him that after he was knocked out, the surgeon requested her permission for the surgery and she refused; everything from Homer's plastic surgery to his "death" was just a dream. She had the doctor reverse Homer's stomach stapling, since she loves him no matter how he looks. The episode ends with Moore, Spiegelman, and Clowes watching Homer and Marge from mid-air. They notice that a meteor is headed for Earth, but become distracted from destroying it by news of a convention for underpaid writers.

== Production ==
Alan Moore recorded his lines in October 2006, after the writers approached his then fiancée Melinda Gebbie. He is said to be a fan of the show. "Husbands and Knives", aired on his fifty-fourth birthday. Jack Black guest starred as Milo, the owner of Coolsville.

== Cultural references ==
Milo sings a Korean version of Tom Jones' "What's New Pussycat?", although parts of the song are random Korean words. At a certain point, he is seen playing Dance Dance Revolution and Guitar Hero at the same time. In the comics store, Lisa walks to The Adventures of Tintin and Asterix shelf. The Belgian comic strip Tintin and the French comic strip Asterix are the most internationally famous European comics. The album she reads, Tintin in Paris, does not exist in the Tintin series but is essentially a mishmash of the cover of Tintin in the Land of the Soviets, the island from The Black Island and the rocket from Destination Moon. Also visible are Tintin in Tibet, The Shooting Star, The Crab with the Golden Claws and Cigars of the Pharaoh.

Marge's gym, Shapes, is a parody of Curves, although there is an actual fitness chain in the Tampa, Florida, area known as Shapes. Art Spiegelman's mask, which he wears when attacking the Comic Book Guy during his rampage on Coolsville, is based upon the mask he has drawn himself wearing as an illustrator in Maus. In Marge’s gym, Shapes, the words "I am woman, hear me sweat" are seen on the wall. This is a reference to the Helen Reddy song, "I Am Woman". In a short scene where a line graph showing Marge's profits appears the Pet Shop Boys song "Opportunities (Let's Make Lots of Money)" plays in the background.

Alan Moore's outburst at Milhouse's request that he sign a DVD of the film Watchmen Babies in V for Vacation (a parody of Watchmen and V for Vendetta, complete with infant versions of Ozymandias, Doctor Manhattan, Rorschach and Nite-Owl II riding a surfboard on the cover) is a reference to Moore's notorious outspoken dissatisfaction with adaptations of his works by major film studios, particularly his refusal to support the then-recent film adaptation of V for Vendetta, in which he demanded that his name not appear in the credits.

Coolsville Comics & Toys is a parody of the Meltdown Comics & Collectibles on Sunset Boulevard in Hollywood, California. The treadmill scene in the gym is a reference to the music video for OK Go's "Here It Goes Again" (complete with the song itself playing). Homer, accused of being a monster, runs for refuge into Springfield's Notre Dame. This is an allusion to The Hunchback of Notre-Dame, Homer being the physically disfigured Quasimodo and Marge being his paramour, Ésmeralda.

== Allegations of predicting 2019 Notre Dame fire ==
Following the fire which occurred at the Notre Dame Cathedral in Paris, France in April 2019, rumors swirled that the episode, which featured a torch wielding mob chase Homer and Marge to Springfield's Notre Dame cathedral, predicted the fire, with even a photo of Mr. Burns standing outside the burning Notre Dame Cathedral of Springfield, which appeared in this episode, spreading across social media. Allegations also spread afterwards that a line which a character said in the 2004 film Before Sunset, "But you have to think that Notre Dame will be gone one day," predicted the fire.

== Reception ==
=== Viewing figures ===
The episode's initial broadcast earned a 3.7 rating and was watched by 10.56 million viewers, which was the 30th most-watched show that week.

=== Critical response ===
Robert Canning of IGN called it an episode that can keep viewers entertained and laughing. He called the character of Milo and Jack Black a perfect fit and particularly enjoyed the appearances of comic book legends Alan Moore, Art Spiegelman and Dan Clowes. He did note that the Homer/Marge plot was "not nearly as enjoyable as the comic related bits" and gave the episode a 7/10.

Richard Keller of TV Squad was surprised by the change in plot from about a comic book store to Homer's fitness. He liked the sight of Homer's fat being clipped to his back and the scene of Homer asks Marge why she stays with him. However, he thought Jack Black was underused in the episode.

In 2007, Entertainment Weekly named Jack Black's role as Milo the second of 16 great guest stars on The Simpsons.

The scene depicting Homer with his excess fat tied behind him before Marge was popularized as an internet meme.
