= That '90s Show (The Simpsons) =

- The Simpsons episode
- The episode's promotional image, featuring Kurt Loder
- Episode no.: Season 19; Episode 11
- Directed by: Mark Kirkland
- Written by: Matt Selman
- Production code: KABF04
- Original air date: January 27, 2008

Guest appearances
- Kurt Loder as himself; "Weird Al" Yankovic as himself

Episode features
- Couch gag: The family is sitting on the couch. The screen zooms out to show them as a painting in a museum with the handwritten caption "Ceci n'est pas une couch gag." ("This is not a couch gag."), a reference to The Treachery of Images.
- Commentary: Matt Groening; Al Jean; Matt Selman; Tim Long; Tom Gammill; Max Pross; Raymond S. Persi; Yeardley Smith

Episode chronology
← Previous "E Pluribus Wiggum"	Next → "Love, Springfieldian Style"
- The Simpsons season 19

"That '90s Show" is the eleventh episode of the nineteenth season of the American animated television series The Simpsons. It first aired on the Fox network in the United States on January 27, 2008. Kurt Loder and "Weird Al" Yankovic both guest star as themselves, this being the second time for Yankovic. The episode was written by Matt Selman, and directed by Mark Kirkland. The episode's title is a parody of That '70s Show and That '80s Show, television programs which also aired on Fox and the former of which subsequently spawned a sequel show called That '90s Show.

After Bart and Lisa discover Marge's degree from Springfield University, Homer and Marge recount one of the darkest points of their relationship, in which Marge has an affair with a pretentious history professor and a dejected, self-destructive Homer achieves brief fame as the frontman of a grunge band.

The show parodies the floating timeline utilized in The Simpsons, in which characters remain the same age even though every episode is set in the present. While previous episodes, such as the 1991 episode "The Way We Was", depicted Homer and Marge's early romance in the 1970s, this episode portrays their lives as a young couple in the mid-'90s, paradoxically the same time period in which the early seasons of the show were produced and set.

== Plot ==
The Simpson family is suffering inside their freezing house because Homer (counting on global warming) did not pay the heating bill. Bart and Lisa, searching for items to feed the fire, discover a box containing a degree belonging to Marge from Springfield University. Homer and Marge look shocked to find it and claim it was from their dating years, confusing Bart as Marge told him he was conceived right after Marge and Homer left high school. Lisa does some calculations and realizes that, because Bart is 10, and Homer and Marge are in their mid-to-late thirties, Bart must have been born later in their parents' relationship than they thought. Marge and Homer proceed to describe one of the darker points of their relationship, the early-to-mid 1990s.

In the flashback, younger Homer and Marge are happily dating, living together in an apartment after graduating from high school. Marge is an avid reader, and Homer is part of an R&B group alongside Lenny, Carl, and Officer Lou. One morning, Marge wakes up to find out she has been accepted into Springfield University but is shocked to learn of the high cost of tuition. Homer, taking pity on Marge, decides to take up work at his father's popular laser tag warehouse in order to pay for it, where he is abused by the children. At Springfield University, Marge is impressed with her surroundings and with her radical feminist negationlist history professor Stefane August, despite Homer's disapproval.

Marge quickly admires August, and they form a mutual attraction. August begins manipulating Marge by telling her Homer is a simple "townie" who would not appreciate her intellect. A shocked Homer arrives and catches the two together. In his anger, he reinvents his R&B group with a new sound called "grunge," which Homer explains is an acronym for "Guitar Rock Utilizing Nihilist Grunge Energy." His band is renamed to "Sadgasm" and they sing a song Homer calls "Politically Incorrect" (based on "Frances Farmer Will Have Her Revenge On Seattle" and "Heart Shaped Box" by Nirvana). A reference to a line in Back to the Future is made when Kurt Cobain is phoned by his cousin, Marvin, saying, "You know that new sound you're looking for? Well, listen to this!", pointing a telephone at the band while they were playing "Politically Incorrect". Marge arrives at the concert, admitting she finds Homer's new music unnerving, while Homer mocks her attraction to August, causing them to end their relationship. Marge begins dating August, leaving Homer devastated.

Homer performs a new song, called "Shave Me" (based on "Rape Me" by Nirvana), which causes him to become so famous that adoring fans surround his new mansion and "Weird Al" Yankovic performs a parody of the song, titled "Brain Freeze", leading a miserable Homer to become bored with his own fame. Marge and August accidentally hear a snippet of Homer's song during a date, shortly before sharing their first kiss. When running onto the beach, August shocks Marge by revealing that he considers marriage oppressive and misogynistic, angering Marge as she desires to get married someday. Marge breaks up with August, breaking his heart. A miserable Marge is surprised to see Homer made a song dedicated to her, called "Margerine" (based on "Glycerine" by Bush), about their relationship. A special news report with Kurt Loder (mirroring Loder's special MTV News report on April 8, 1994, announcing Kurt Cobain's death) interrupts, revealing Sadgasm has broken up and Homer is holed up in his mansion with an alleged narcotics addiction. Arriving there, Marge destroys Homer's drug needles and soon begins caring for him, although it turns out that the needles were actually insulin for his diabetes that he got after he drank too many frappucinos. Whilst recovering in the hospital, Marge apologizes to Homer for her actions, and he forgives her. The two reunite and have sex inside a mini-golf course, implying this is when and where they conceived Bart, though Bart and Lisa fall asleep during the revelation. As Homer and Marge end their story, August, who has been watching the couple's recollections transpire outside their window, mockingly brands them "townies" and walks away.

== Production ==
Author Kurt Loder and musician "Weird Al" Yankovic appeared as themselves. Yankovic previously appeared in the fourteenth season episode "Three Gays of the Condo".

== Cultural references ==
When Homer's band is playing "Politically Incorrect", a character named "Marvin Cobain" calls his cousin Kurt Cobain on the phone and makes him listen to the song, stating that it might be the new sound he has been looking for. This is a reference to a scene from the movie Back to the Future where Marvin Berry calls his cousin Chuck Berry and makes him listen to Marty McFly playing a cover of "Johnny B. Goode".

The breaking news broadcast on TV by Kurt Loder (voiced by Loder himself) self-references Loder's own breaking news broadcast on MTV News that Kurt Cobain was dead. The episode title is a reference to another popular, but live-action, Fox sitcom That '70s Show. The same title would coincidentally later be used for that show's 2023 sequel series. The episode parodies Kurt Cobain's rise to fame with Nirvana. Sadgasm is a parody of Nirvana, and the band's breakup references Cobain's breakup with Nirvana. When Homer blocks himself from his fans in his mansion, this references Cobain's heroin addiction and his depression before his suicide. Most of Sadgasm's songs are based on songs from Nirvana (although notably the song “Margerine” is a direct reference to “Glycerine” by Bush.) Furthermore, the appearance of "Weird Al" Yankovic is a reference to his real life connection to Nirvana, as he wrote "Smells Like Nirvana", a parody of the Nirvana song "Smells Like Teen Spirit".

In one scene, it is implied that Homer is watching Seinfeld, as the theme can be heard. He also says to Marge, "No soup for you!", and that he is the "master of his domain," which are lines from the episodes "The Soup Nazi" and "The Contest", respectively, and ponders, "Oh Elaine, will you ever find a man who's sponge-worthy?", an allusion to the episode "The Sponge".

When Homer goes to Moe's and asks for a beer, Moe tells him he turned his establishment into a cigar bar, a reference to the 1990s' cigar boom.

== Reception ==
An estimated 7.6 million viewers tuned into the episode.

Robert Canning of IGN gave the episode a 3 out of 10. He said the episode "insulted lifelong Simpsons fans everywhere" for changing the continuity of the show. Although he liked the jokes about the 1990s, he thought it was an "insult" to famous moments of the series.

Richard Keller of TV Squad enjoyed the many cultural references to the 1990s, but felt disappointed that the episode changed the continuity of The Simpsons.
