= Michael Price (writer) =

American writer and producer

Michael Price is an American writer and producer, best known for his Emmy and Writers Guild award-winning work on The Simpsons. Price is a writer and co-executive producer of the ABC series Teacher's Pet. He served as a script consultant on The Simpsons Movie and wrote the Lego Star Wars special, Lego Star Wars: The Padawan Menace. He works at Lucasfilm writing and producing the Lego Star Wars Franchise.

Other television shows he has written for include What About Joan?, The PJs, Teen Angel, Homeboys in Outer Space, The Newz, and One Minute to Air.

Price co-wrote and co-produced the Bill Burr series F Is for Family in 2015 on Netflix. The show is an animated sitcom and draws from Burr's standup.

He grew up in South Plainfield, New Jersey and attended Montclair State University, where he earned a B.A. degree in Theatre Arts, and Tulane University, where he earned a Master of Fine Arts degree in directing for the theatre.

== Filmography ==
Year	Title	Credit	Notes
1994	The Newz	Writer	
1994–95	Aaahh!!! Real Monsters	Writer	5 episodes
1995	Santo Bugito	Writer	2 episodes
1996–97	Homeboys in Outer Space	Writer	2 episodes
1997	Teen Angel	Writer	3 episodes
1998–99	Hercules	Story editor, writer	67 episodes
2000	The PJs	Writer, supervising producer	2 episodes
2000	Buzz Lightyear of Star Command	Writer	Episode: "Mira's Wedding"
2000	Teacher's Pet	Writer, co-executive producer	13 episodes
2002–present	The Simpsons	Writer, co-executive producer	266 episodes
2007	The Simpsons Movie	Consultant writer	
2010	Presidential Reunion	Co-writer	Video
2011	Lego Star Wars: The Padawan Menace	Writer	TV special
2012	The Men's Room	Writer	TV film
2012	Lego Star Wars: The Empire Strikes Out	Writer	TV special
2013–14	Lego Star Wars: The Yoda Chronicles	Writer, executive producer	7 episodes
2014	Achmed Saves America	Writer	Video
2015	Lego Star Wars: Droid Tales	Writer, executive producer	3 episodes
2015–21	F Is for Family	Co-creator, writer, executive producer	16 episodes

=== The Simpsons episodes ===
Price has written the following episodes:
Year	Title	Notes
2003	"My Mother the Carjacker"	Nominated for WGA Award in Animation.
2003	"'Tis the Fifteenth Season"	
2005	"Mommie Beerest"	Won WGA Award in Animation.
2006	"My Fair Laddy"	
2007	"Yokel Chords"	Won Annie Award for Best Music in an Animated Television Production.
2007	"The Boys of Bummer"	
2007	"Funeral for a Fiend"	
2008	"E Pluribus Wiggum"	
2009	"How the Test Was Won"	
2010	"American History X-cellent"	
2010	"The Fool Monty"	
2012	"At Long Last Leave"	The 500th episode of the show
2012	"Them, Robot"	
2012	"Penny-Wiseguys"	
2013	"Dangers on a Train"	
2014	"You Don't Have to Live Like a Referee"	
2015	"Walking Big & Tall"	
2015	"Mathlete's Feat"	
2016	"Much Apu About Something"	
2017	"Fatzcarraldo"	
2018	"Fears of a Clown"	
2019	"Mad About the Toy"	The 650th episode of the show
2021	"Do PizzaBots Dream of Electric Guitars?"	
2022	"Meat is Murder"	
2023	"Hostile Kirk Place"	
2023	"AE Bonny Romance"	
2025	"Treehouse of Horror XXXVI"	segment "Clown Night with the Devil"
