= Lists of celebrities =

A celebrity is a person who is widely recognized in a given society and commands a degree of public and media attention. The word is derived from the French celebrite, from the adjective célébrité ("fame" or "celebrated"). Being a celebrity is often one of the highest degrees of notability, although the word notable is mistaken to be synonymous with the title celebrity, fame, prominence etc. In Wikipedia, articles written about notable people do not necessarily make them a celebrity.

The following are lists of celebrities:

- List of most-followed Instagram accounts
- List of celebrities in The Simpsons
- List of celebrity guest stars in Sesame Street
- List of celebrity inventors
- List of celebrities with advanced degrees
- List of comedians
- List of dance personalities
- List of dancers
- List of fashion designers
- List of female boxers
- List of film and television directors
- List of Forbes Celebrity 100
- List of League of Legends players
- List of male boxers
- List of musicians
- List of news presenters
- Lists of singers
- List of singer-songwriters
- List of social thinkers
- Lists of sportspeople
- List of stars on the Hollywood Walk of Fame
- List of stars on the London Avenue of Stars
- List of tattoo artists
- List of television presenters
- List of TikTokers
- List of wrestlers
- List of YouTubers
- List of most-subscribed Twitch channels
- List of most-followed Twitch channels
