= Invision =

Invision or InVision may refer to:

- Invision Agency, an entertainment company part owned by The Associated Press
- Invision Community, an Internet community software produced by Invision Power Services
- Invision Private Equity, owners of Swiss Education Group
- Invision Studios, a film production company based in Harare, Zimbabwe
- InVision Technologies, a manufacturer of airport security screening devices to detect explosives in baggage
