= Lisa the Skeptic =

- The Simpsons episode
- The townspeople see the "angel" "come to life".
- Episode no.: Season 9 Episode 8
- Directed by: Neil Affleck
- Written by: David X. Cohen
- Production code: 5F05
- Original air date: November 23, 1997

Guest appearances
- Stephen Jay Gould as himself; Phil Hartman as Lionel Hutz

Episode features
- Chalkboard gag: "I will not tease fatty"
- Couch gag: The living room is a sauna, with three men in towels relaxing. The Simpsons (also in towels) arrive, but leave sheepishly as the three men glare at them.
- Commentary: Matt Groening; Mike Scully; David X. Cohen; George Meyer; Yeardley Smith; Pete Michels

Episode chronology
← Previous "The Two Mrs. Nahasapeemapetilons"	Next → "Realty Bites"
- The Simpsons season 9

"Lisa the Skeptic" is the eighth episode of the ninth season of the American animated television series The Simpsons. It first aired on Fox in the United States on November 23, 1997. On an archaeological dig with her class, Lisa discovers a skeleton that resembles an angel. All of the townspeople believe that the skeleton actually came from an angel, but skeptical Lisa attempts to persuade them that there must be a rational scientific explanation. The episode's writer, David X. Cohen, developed the idea after visiting the American Museum of Natural History, and decided to loosely parallel themes from the Scopes Monkey Trial. The episode also makes allusions to actual hoaxes, such as the Cardiff Giant.

It has been discussed in the context of ontology, existentialism, and skepticism; it has also been used in Christian religious education classes to initiate discussion about angels, science, and faith.

== Plot ==
Homer attempts to claim a motorboat from a "police raffle" that turns out to be a sting operation. While returning home, the family passes a new mall being built on an area where a number of fossils were found. Lisa protests and the management allows Springfield Elementary to conduct an archaeological survey. During the excavations, Lisa finds a human skeleton with wings. Springfield's residents are convinced it is the remains of an angel, and Homer cashes in by moving the skeleton into the family's garage, charging visitors to see it.

Lisa remains skeptical and asks scientist Dr. Stephen Jay Gould to test a sample of the skeleton. When Dr. Gould appears at the Simpson house the next day to tell Lisa that the tests were inconclusive, Lisa goes on television to compare the belief in angels to the belief in fictional things, such as leprechauns. In response, Springfield's religious zealots go on a rampage to destroy all scientific institutions. Appalled with the violence, Lisa goes into the garage to destroy the skeleton, but finds that it has disappeared. The mob soon converges on the Simpson household, and Lisa is arrested and put on trial for destroying the skeleton.

Before the trial even begins, the skeleton is seen outside the courtroom. Everyone rushes to it to see a foreboding message added to the skeleton, warning that "The End" will come at sundown. Sunset approaches and the citizens gather around the skeleton, but nothing happens. As Lisa reprimands them, a booming voice from the skeleton silences her and announces, "The End... of high prices!" The skeleton is then hoisted over to the entrance of the new Heavenly Hills Mall. Lisa realizes the whole event was a publicity stunt for the mall, and criticizes management for taking advantage of peoples' beliefs. She attempts to boycott them, but the bargain-loving public shrugs off the exploitation and goes shopping, while Dr. Gould confesses that he never actually tested the sample. Marge observes that while it was talking, Lisa believed the angel was real. She denies this, but admits she was frightened, and thanks her mother for her support, as they walk away.

== Production ==
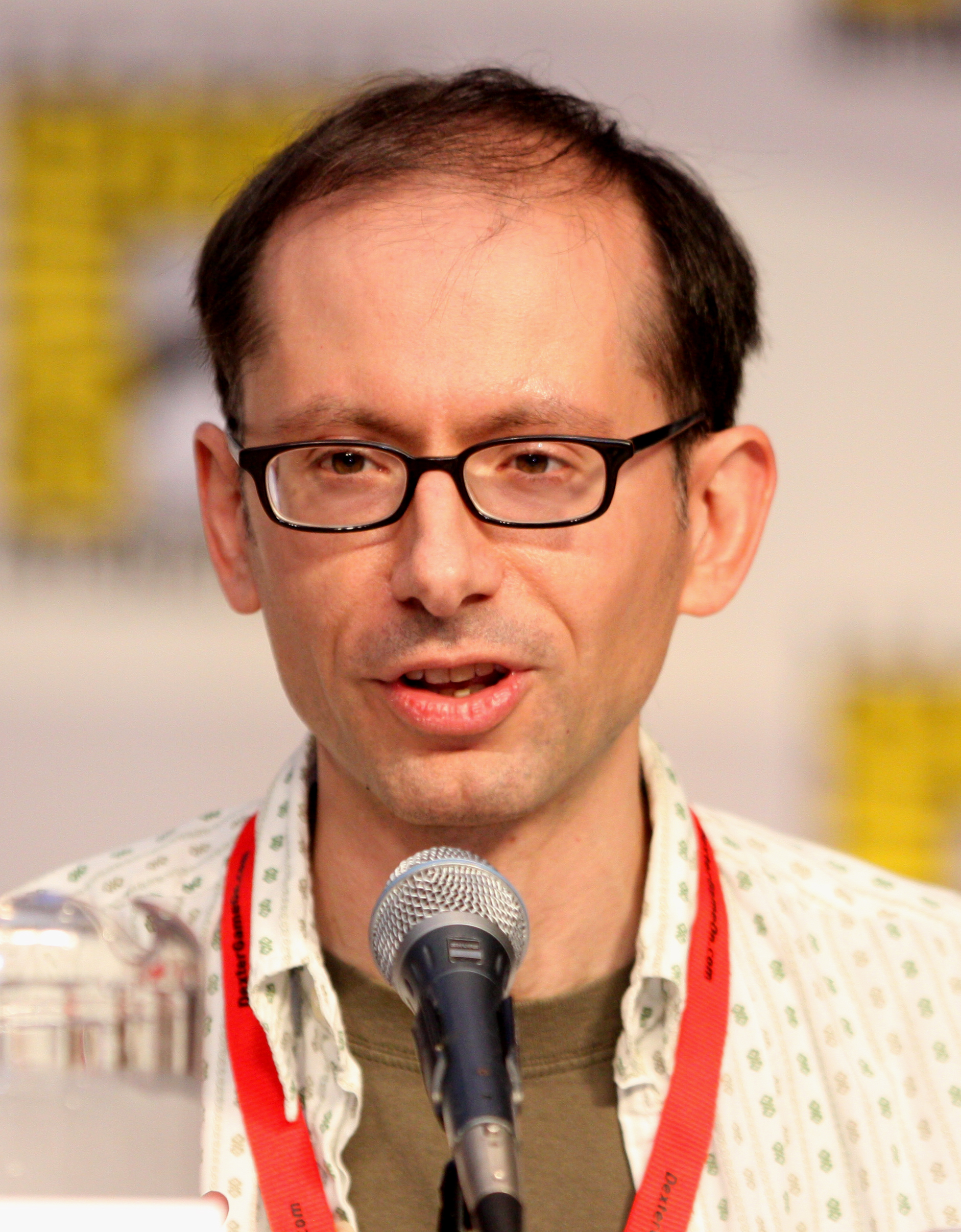
David X. Cohen wrote the episode after being inspired by a visit to the American Museum of Natural History.

"Lisa the Skeptic" was written by David X. Cohen, and directed by Neil Affleck. Cohen was inspired to write the episode after a trip to Manhattan's American Museum of Natural History, where he decided to turn the visit into a "business trip", and think of a possible episode connection to the museum. He initially wanted Lisa to find a "missing link" skeleton, and do an episode reminiscent of the Scopes Monkey Trial. Writer George Meyer convinced him instead to have the focus be on an angel skeleton, while keeping an emphasis on the conflict between religion and science. Both Cohen and Meyer acknowledged how silly the "angel skeleton" idea was owing to simple questions raised such as why an angel died and why bones were left behind, but they went forward with the idea anyway.

In an early draft of the script, the skeleton was made of pastry dough baked by the mall's window dresser. Cohen had initially written the Stephen Jay Gould role as a generic scientist or paleontologist, not knowing that they would eventually get Gould. He had taken Gould's Introduction to Paleontology class at Harvard University. The only phrase Gould had objected to in the script was a line that introduced him as the "world's most brilliant paleontologist". His original final line was "I didn't do the test. I had more important work to do", but it was cut because the writers felt it would be funnier to give him a short final line. In an earlier version of the episode, Marge would have ended up apologizing to Lisa for not supporting her, letting the ending be more of a nod to Lisa's correct assumptions all along.

== Themes ==
Author Joley Wood compared "Lisa the Skeptic" to an alternate reality game, in analyzing the effects of watching the television program Lost on contemporary culture and our own perceptions of reality. Dan O'Brien cited the episode in a discussion of ontology, skepticism, and religious faith, in his book An Introduction to the Theory of Knowledge. O'Brien leaves it up to the reader to decide whether or not Lisa was justified in her skepticism. In The Simpsons and Philosophy: The D'oh! of Homer, "Lisa the Skeptic" is cited as a prime example of why Lisa is seen as the epitome of a nerd. The book also cited the episode in noting that Lisa is not infallible, for when the Angel appeared to speak at the end of the episode she became as frightened as everyone else. Lisa's frustration with the marketing gimmick used by the mall developers is seen by Turner's Planet Simpson: How a Cartoon Masterpiece Documented an Era and Defined a Generation as yet another example of her conflict with corporations throughout the series. Like O'Brien, Turner also analyzed the episode in the context of Lisa's questions about existentialism, self-absorption, and consumption. In The Psychology of the Simpsons: D'oh!, the authors discuss Lisa's level of anger displayed in the episode, noting that in this particular case her anger gave her the wherewithal both to confront social injustice, and keep her mind clear for critical thinking. Mark Demming of Allmovie noted that Lisa symbolically stood for the side of reason, while her mother Marge symbolized belief and spirituality in the episode.

In their 2010 book The Simpsons in the Classroom, Karma Waltonen and Denise Du Vernay note that the episode is one of the best for teachers and professors to use in religion or cultural studies courses, noting the irony that though Lisa is the only skeptic through most of the episode, she is the only one who is offended at the publicity stunt. Parvin's The Gospel According to the Simpsons: Leader's Guide for Group Study is a group study guide companion to Pinsky's The Gospel According to the Simpsons. In the section pertaining to "Lisa the Skeptic", a skeptic is defined as: "a person who doubts, questions, or suspends judgment on ideas generally accepted by others". The study group is asked to debate the episode in the context of skepticism as related to other unexplained phenomena, including UFOs, the Loch Ness Monster, the Abominable Snowman, the Bermuda Triangle, Atlantis, near-death experiences, reincarnation, mediumship, psychics, and fortune-telling. In Pinsky's book itself, he noted that Lisa faced the difficult task of confronting religious hysteria and blind faith, and also attempted to reconcile science within her own belief system. He also wrote that when Lisa asks Stephen Jay Gould to estimate the age of the skeleton, the issue is never raised of why angels or other spiritual entities would even leave skeletons behind in the first place.

== Cultural references ==
While driving to the police station to pick up the motorboat Homer thinks he won, he sings a slightly altered version of the 1967 hit Up, Up and Away by The 5th Dimension. The scene in the courtroom where Lisa is put on trial for stealing the skeleton is seen as a reference to the 1920s Scopes Monkey Trial in Dayton, Tennessee, which dealt with issues of separation of church and state and the debate between creationism and evolution. The publicity stunt created by the mall developers in the episode has been compared to scientific hoaxes such as the Cardiff Giant and the Piltdown Man. When Lisa asks if the townspeople are outraged at the end of the episode for being fooled by a publicity stunt, Chief Wiggum is about to answer her but is distracted when he catches sight of a Pottery Barn in the new Heavenly Hills mall. A shot of the diggers in silhouette against the sunset is modeled after Raiders of the Lost Ark (1981).

== Reception ==
In its original broadcast, "Lisa the Skeptic" finished 37th in ratings for the week of November 17–23, 1997, with a Nielsen rating of 9.5, equivalent to approximately 9.3 million viewing households. It was the third highest-rated show on the Fox network that week, following The X-Files and King of the Hill.

Donald Liebenson wrote for the Amazon.com movie review that "Bart Sells His Soul" and "Lisa the Skeptic" were among the best episodes of The Simpsons. He also noted, "Without being preachy (or particularly funny), this episode is pretty potent stuff", citing the theme of Apocalypticism towards the end of the episode.

In the July 26, 2007 issue of Nature, the scientific journal's editorial staff listed the episode among "The Top Ten science moments in The Simpsons".

The episode is used by the Farmington Trust (UK) for Christian religious education, to teach children about skepticism. The episode is used as a tool, to involve the students in a debate about religion and science, as well as to discuss Lisa's own skepticism, and her respect towards others. A group of The Simpsons enthusiasts at Calvin College have also analyzed the religious and philosophical aspects of the episode, including the issue of faith versus science.

== See also ==
- Angels in art
