= John Shearer (photographer, born 1981) =

American photographer (born 1981)

- Born: June 14, 1981 (age 45); California, U.S.
- Occupation: Photographer
- Spouse: Clea Shearer (m. 2008)
- Website: www.johnshearer.com

John Shearer (born June 14, 1981) is an American music, entertainment, and portrait photographer.

== Career ==
Shearer, based in Nashville, Tennessee, is known for his work in entertainment portraiture, key art for film and television, Oscars, advertising, album covers, and backstage documentary coverage. His past credits include the SAG Awards, The Oscars, MTV Video Music Awards, the Grammys, and the CMA Awards.

Shearer has worked for Getty Images since 2005 and co-founded Invision Agency in partnership with The Associated Press. In 2015, he left the company to become the Nashville Bureau Chief for Getty Images.

He captured the now-iconic photo of Britney Spears and Madonna kissing on stage at MTV Video Music Awards in 2003. In 2015, Shearer's photograph was used as the cover of Shadows in the Night. He was described as Dylan's "more or less Dylan's official photographer". In 2023, Shearer's photo of Taylor Swift was chosen as the theatrical release poster art for Taylor Swift: The Eras Tour.
