= Celebrity privacy =

Right of celebrities to withhold information they do not wish to disclose

Celebrity privacy refers to the right of celebrities and public figures, largely entertainers, athletes or politicians, to withhold the information they are unwilling to disclose. This term often pertains explicitly to personal information, which includes addresses and family members, among other data for personal identification. Different from the privacy of the general public, 'Celebrity Privacy' is considered as "controlled publicity," challenged by the press and the fans. In addition, Paparazzi make commercial use of their private data.

Some national and state governments set up privacy laws mainly to protect celebrity privacy and their family members. The legal impact of these celebrity privacy laws has currently been undetermined since the curb for celebrity privacy intrusion often counteracts the legal principle of "free press" in many countries.

== Debate the Celebrity Privacy ==
Scholars have debated how much or what type of privacy celebrities and their friends or family can or should expect. Commonly posed arguments center upon topics such as the idea of celebrity privacy as controlled publicity, the intrusion of paparazzi or fans, and what types of privacy should be granted to and expected by children of celebrities.

=== Celebrity privacy as a controlled publicity ===
Celebrities are often controlled by the public exposure they receive and the need to maintain positive professional images. This invasion of privacy causes their private lives to be governed by the public. Jamie Nordhaus says, "The boundaries of privacy and publicity for celebrities can become blurred, as they most are always watched by fans, paparazzi, and other potential stalkers." It has been suggested that celebrities "remain conscious of maintaining a public persona when they are in the public eye as opposed to a personal one in private" and "negotiate with the press to release staged private life photos." Jens Heffman argues that 'Celebrity attempts to sacrifice their privacy for publicity may result in a loss of legal protections, as celebrities claiming that an invasion of privacy by the press could be seen as using media to achieve or maintain fame.' The latter argument was used in a court decision on a stolen sex tape that featured American actress Pamela Anderson Lee and her then-boyfriend Bret Michaels. Lee has sued Internet Entertainment Group (IEG) and Paramount for broadcasting a story in 1998 that contained excerpts from the tape; however, the court considered her voluntarily sacrificing her privacy in hopes of publicizing herself. Scholar Seong Hong has stated Lee's privacy right was not protected because of her celebrity identity.

=== Intrusion by paparazzi and fans ===
==== Paparazzi ====
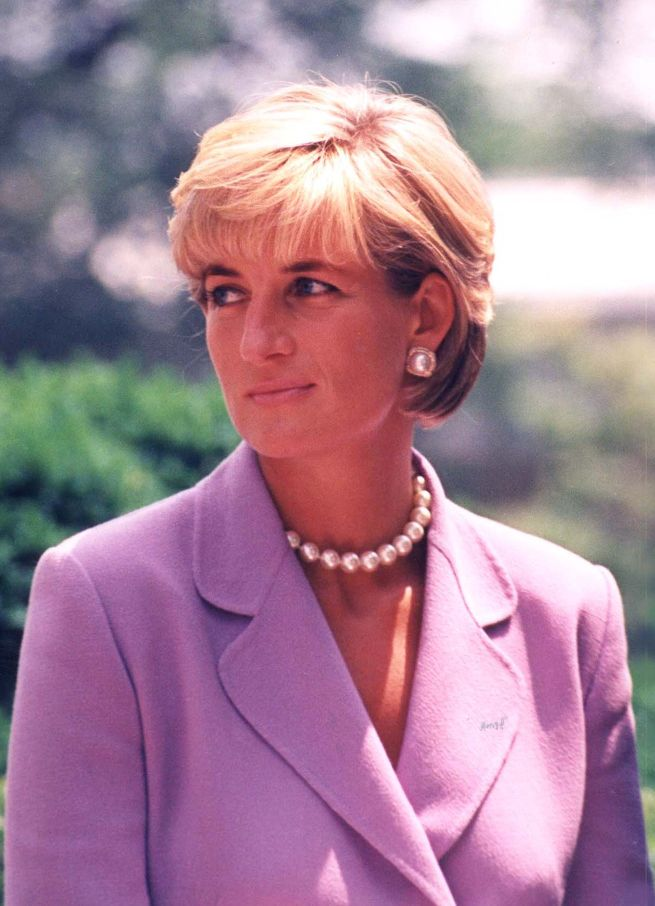
Diana, Princess of Wales

Celebrities' pictures are taken and sold to the press for financial purposes by freelance photographers known by the term "paparazzi." Some techniques which the term paparazzi use include stalking, which could cause turbulence to the lives of celebrities if approached aggressively. The method of stalking is harmful according to past events, as it has led to injury or death of the star. The death of Diana, Princess of Wales, has been cited as an example of the risks of paparazzi techniques. On the other hand, scholar Elizabeth Hindman claims that the sale of exaggerated content without context to sensationalize particular moments has decreased credibility in the news industry.

Ray Murray argues that "some paparazzi will draw an ethical line" by following specific rules. In a series of paparazzi interviews, most participants claimed they would not break the law. Some attested that they would not take any photo of celebrity children without consent." Scholar Andrew Mendelson has argued that "Paparazzi are valuable in that they reveal potential mismatches between the public image and the reality of celebrities who possess great power in contemporary society, which legitimizes the paparazzi's invasion of celebrity privacy as a form of watchdog journalism."

Anne Jerslev and Mette Mendelson have noted that the paparazzi have become integrated into mainstream culture, and their photographs are distributed widely and quickly by consumers.

==== Fans ====
Scholar Kinta Hung suggests that the "dual entertainment path model" shows that fans and non-fans use different ways to engage with their favourite celebrities. As for those who are not fans, they pay attention to celebrities and the released news to escape from boredom. For fans, they put a much higher emotional investment into creating an individual "bond" with stars, which gives them pleasure and a sense of satisfaction. Fans try to become physically and mentally closer to their idols by attending concerts, movies, and fan meetings. The term stalking also exists with fans, as in extreme circumstances, fans may be obsessed with their celebrities and invade the celebrities' privacy. Scholar Jens Hoffman has argued that this results from a pathological fixation. Fans exhibiting this can believe there is a special connection between their favourite celebrities and themselves, even though such a relationship does not exist. Once unsatisfied, this fixation can lead fans to invade celebrity privacy out of disappointment and resentment.

These extreme fans are known as "Sasaeng fan," which means "private life fan" in English according to South Korean Culture. According to a study by William Patrick and Samantha Xiang, Sasaeng fans are typically teenage girls between 13–22 years old. Their common stalking behaviours include installing hidden cameras in idols' homes, chasing idols' cars at high speed, and stealing personal things from idols' rooms. Some actions done by sasaeng fans, such as poisoning members of a disliked K-POP idols or using bodily fluids to write letters to the object of their affection, are not advocated in South Korea.

=== Celebrity children ===
Celebrities' private lives have been a primary interest of the public; this prompted paparazzi to catch specific and trivial details of celebrities' daily lives, not excluding their children. Often fame and private lifestyles of celebrities are posted by the paparazzi. These images can be either authorized or unauthorized. Seong Hong claims that due to celebrity children's photos circulation, the media leads the public to establish a pseudo-relationship with them and imagine them as "our children." This public imagination, combined with the potentially constant presence of paparazzi, has been seen as having the potential to threaten the privacy of celebrity children.

==== Effects ====
Lidia Maropo and Ana Jorge argue that celebrity children usually appear in newspapers and magazines with their families. Moments like celebrity children playing in the park or having a picnic with the whole family are posted on media, reflecting the importance of children in the family and advocating for a more harmonious family relationship. Celebrity children's photos can also suggest a pleasant experience and a sense of satisfaction with being a parent. The circulation of celebrity children's images attracts the public to focus on Family Relationships. It highlights the happiness brought by children and the responsibility of parents.

The exposure of celebrity children to the public can result in the invasion of their Privacy rights. For example, the 20-month-old son of aviator Charles A. Lindbergh, who became a national celebrity after he created records for flying from the U.S. to France in 1927, was kidnapped and murdered in 1932. After this tragedy, Jon, Lindbergh's second son, was chased continuously by the paparazzi's cars. Lindbergh decided not to raise legal appeals but to move outside of the U.S. with his family to protect Jon. Additionally, some celebrities send photos of their children to the media to prevent paparazzi from continuing to disrupt their private lives: American film celebrities David Arquette and Courteney Cox released the image of their daughter Coco to the press, to prevent themselves from being chased by paparazzi.

=== Legal protection regarding children privacy ===
==== The United Nations ====
The United Nations Convention on the Rights of the Child (UNCRC) was permitted in 1989 as human rights started to gain more attention globally. This treaty deals with the most fundamental issue between children and the media, such as free expression, non-discrimination and respect. Article 16, in particular, set that children have the right to protect themselves when encountering illegal interference of privacy or attacks on reputation. All the UN countries, except the U.S. and Somalia, approved and signed this treaty.

==== United States ====
Seong Hong argues that in the United States, celebrity children's privacy is rarely protected by U.S. law. The legal protection of celebrity children is too narrow, which might counteract the First Amendment, which emphasizes the "free press" to encourage democratic voices. However, as the California Anti-Paparazzi Act was introduced, some celebrities suggested the state government should focus more on celebrity children. Actress Halle Berry hoped the law could restrict paparazzi from approaching celebrity children, including its effects on her children. Scholar Joshua Azriel suggests that there should be a total ban on the photos of celebrity children with more substantial punishment.

==== Brazil ====
In Brazil, the Child and Adolescent Statute (ECA in the Portuguese acronym) directly and indirectly addressed the relationship between children and media. ECA grants children fundamental civil and human rights, including free expression and the right to image, ideas, identity, etc. Article 18, in particular, emphasizes that everyone has the responsibility to protect children's dignity and save them from any violent or terrifying situation. Besides, Article 74–80 covers children from harmful public media, such as violent television shows.

==== Portugal ====
In Portugal, the Law for Protection of Children and Youth at Risk (LPCJP in the Portuguese acronym) protects children from media that bring risky elements, such as violence or inhumanity. Besides, The Young Offenders’ Law prohibits media from identifying youngsters from 12–16 who commit illegal actions.

== Global Celebrity Privacy Laws ==
=== United States ===
==== California "Anti-Paparazzi" Law ====
In August 1997, Princess Diana died in a car accident in France which was suspected to be caused by seven paparazzi. Although the judge clarified later that the drunk driver rather than the paparazzi caused the accident, the California government was aware of the danger brought by paparazzi and thus quickly set the first anti-paparazzi law.

In 1998, California set the "invasion of privacy statute," which prohibited using digital devices to take photos of celebrities on private occasions. However, this statute is criticized by opponents who believe it might inhibit the freedom of the press to gather news. Also, the language used needed to be more broad and specific. Some media attorneys described the statute as a "Pandora's box" that brought a large number of severe problems.

The First Amendment of the "invasion of privacy statute" was passed in 2005, which regulated the profits from photos taken during altercations between celebrities and photographers will be forfeited. The fine was imposed in 2005 by the California legislature on making a profit from any picture in which paparazzi assaulted a celebrity and expanding the 1708.8 civil code. In 2009, another new law A.B 524, stated that California would charge up to $50,000 penalties from the first publishers of the photos taken in ways that violate the privacy statute. This law aimed to stop the paparazzi who take private photos of celebrities for profit-gaining reasons. However, scholars Christina Locke and Kara Murrhee claim that the law is ineffective because the first publishers of celebrity photos can usually make over a million dollars. Furthermore, A.B 524 seemly contradicts the Supreme Court again for prohibiting the press from gaining news legally.

Due to confrontations between celebrities and paparazzi still occurring and even worsening, in January 2010, another anti-paparazzi law, A.B 2479, was passed. It was to address two main problems: the paparazzi’s car-chasing, which often leads to accidents and their behaviours that prevent the celebrities from moving freely. A.B 2479 further established financial and criminal penalties for people who result in reckless driving because of the intention to gain photos or recordings of other people for commercial purposes. The fine will be between $145 and $1,000, and the term of imprisonment will be between 5–90 days. If any child is inside the car during reckless driving, the fine will be up to $5,000, and the term of imprisonment will be up to one year. Also, to curb the paparazzi from encompassing the celebrities and thus prevent them from moving freely, the law counts this behaviour as false imprisonment that allows for extra damages. In 2015, the state appealed the superior court of Los Angeles to arrest the paparazzi for breaking California vehicle code section 40008 in which paparazzi endangered the motorist and chased the celebrity in high-speed car to take a picture.

===== Debate =====
The supporters of A.B 2479 were The City of Los Angeles, the Screen Actors Guild and the Paparazzi Reform Initiative. Aggressive behaviours of paparazzi, such as parking their cars to block the celebrities' cars or crowding the stars in public spaces, have seriously disrupted celebrities' private lives. On the other hand, California Newspaper Publishers Association (CNPA) opposed the bill since it undermines the activity of the press to gather news freely. Also, CNPA argued that the penalties for reckless driving targeted at journalists are unfair. Christina Locke and Kara Murrhee state that A.B. 2479 has made significant changes regarding focus. However, the conflict between the California anti-paparazzi law and the Constitution's First Amendment still exists.

==== "Anti-Paparazzi law" vs. The First Amendment ====
Keith Willis claims that in the U.S legal system, the conflict between the right to privacy and the right to free expression exists. Many state bills, such as California's anti-paparazzi law, are set to protect celebrity privacy, while the First Amendment of Constitution ensures the press's freedom to express and gather information. In history, the balance of these two forces has been uncertain—sometimes the celebrities’ privacy requests outweigh the freedoms of press and expression, while other times the First Amendment is prioritized over celebrities who claim to be disrupted by the open press.

=== United Kingdom ===
Britain set laws to restrict press reporting earlier than many other countries to prevent the royal family from being disrupted by the media. Also, institutions like the European Convention on Human Rights and the British Law Commission have been submitting proposals to protect individual privacy. After the death of Princess Diana in 1997, the Press Complaints Commission, a self-regulating organization of British media, proposed a series of regulations to prevent similar accidents. The proposals include banning paparazzi photos taken through continuous pursuit, expanding the definition of private property, strengthening the protection for celebrity children, and preventing media collective harassment.

=== France ===
According to Jamie Nordhaus, Although the French government set strong laws to prevent paparazzi from invading celebrity privacy, these laws counteract each other. They, thus, are not efficient enough to protect celebrities and their children. The government prohibits paparazzi from publishing any photo that is not consented to by the subjects but allows them to post pictures in public places. According to the New York Times, "France has such strict press privacy laws that editors usually print a black band across the faces of subjects who have not given permission for their pictures to be published." Besides, the high profits resulting from publishing exclusive celebrity photos in France significantly exceed the $32,000 fine, which encourages French paparazzi to take risks.

=== New Zealand ===
Like the U.S., Seong Hung claims privacy laws rarely protect celebrities and their children in New Zealand. In 2004, Mr. Hosking, a well-known television celebrity in New Zealand, sued Pacific Magazine for taking and publishing the photos of his children. Still, the Court of Appeal ruled against Mr. Hosking by stating that the photographs did not invade his privacy right because they were taken in public spaces

=== Spain ===
The threat to private life due to expansion in technology and photography was noted in 1890 by Warren and Brandies, lawyers from Boston. After more than one century, the ways of finding information about someone's private life have increased, easily violating the right to privacy. The government has imposed legal regulations considering the right to privacy for revealing someone's personal information to others, spreading through social media, allowing others to have access to someone's details and allowing others to distribute and expose the data. In Article 198 of the Spanish penal code, the civil government has analyzed the new code to the right to punishable privacy offences: taking someone's paper, letters, electronic messages, and belongings or intercepting communication in someone's personal space and exposing or spreading obtained information. The punishment for these offences will be greater if the person is an authority and civil servant.

== Other laws regarding celebrity privacy ==
=== Right of publicity ===
==== United States ====
The right of publicity, also called personality rights, aims to control and protect the unauthorized commercial use of people's identities, such as names, photos, or likenesses. Based on the right to privacy, the right of publicity is relatively new in the U.S. and was first recognized in the 1953 Haelan Laboratories v. Topps Chewing Gum case. Supreme Court later analyzed it in the 1977 Zacchini v. Scripps-Howard Broadcasting Co. case. The right to publicity is significant due to the trend of "everyone can be famous on the Internet for 15 minutes"; the right to publicity becomes increasingly relevant and vital protection. This right is closely related to celebrity privacy because it protects celebrities from paparazzi or individuals who take their names and images for commercial use. Currently, no federal law in the U.S. protects celebrities' right to publicity. However, states like California have established statutes and common law to protect celebrity citizens. Keith Willis argues that publicity rights controversies often happen on celebrity product endorsement issues.

==== Canada ====
According to Ellen Whitehorn, the Canadian government protects the right to publicity. However, the extent of the scope is still uncertain. The Courts protect individuals’ gain from self-marketing, including name, images and personality, when violated. Similar to the U.S., the right of publicity laws mainly concentrate on different provinces. For example, Ontario has specific common laws which prevent personality rights from being violated commercially. However, while the right to publicity in the U.S. originates from the right to privacy, the personality right in Canada stems from the Unfair competition law.

==== United Kingdom ====
Ellen Whitehorn claims that The United Kingdom currently does not have a specific legal statute to protect the right of publicity because, in history, U.K has been inclined to offer more protection for free speech and thus less focus on celebrity and their publicity rights. However, the U.K government still protects the right of publicity through other torts, such as some claims in the British Human Rights Act, violation of copyright, or misuse of private information.

=== Copyright ===
Copyright is also closely related to celebrity privacy. In the U.S., Congress enacts copyright law based on Article 1(8)8 of the Constitution, which suggests that authors have the exclusive right to their work for a limited period. The original work protected by copyright laws includes literary, artistic, musical, dramatic, etc. Since the producers of the original work are artists, musicians, or well-known authors, they are likely to be involved in copyright lawsuits. This could affect their privacy rights. Scholar O'Neill Eaton suggests that sometimes the press fights for the copyright of paparazzi photos to make most of the profits from exclusive celebrity images. In 2006, the famous U.S. celebrity gossip blogger Perez Hilton was sued by paparazzi agency X17 because he posted photos taken by X17 onto his website without permission. Perez has denied violating copyright laws, stating that his work falls under fair use, as he uses the material for humour and satire. The Court's final decision was that Perez's use of the paparazzi photos violated copyright laws, as Perez gained huge profits from publishing the paparazzi photos.

== See also ==
- Celebrity culture
- Celebrity photography
- Death of Diana, Princess of Wales
- Celebrity sex tape
- Internet privacy
