= The Psychology of The Simpsons =

2006 non-fiction book

- Book cover
- Author: Alan S. Brown, Ph.D. Chris Logan (Editors)
- Cover artist: Todd Michael Bushman
- Language: English
- Series: Psychology of Popular Culture
- Subject: Psychology, The Simpsons
- Publisher: BenBella Books
- Publication date: March 1, 2006
- Publication place: United States
- Media type: Print
- Pages: 240
- ISBN: 1-932100-70-9
- OCLC: 62593448
- Dewey Decimal: 791.45/72
- LC Class: PN1992.77.S58 P89 2006

The Psychology of The Simpsons: D'oh! is a non-fiction book analyzing psychology themes in the television series The Simpsons. It contains content from several contributors, including psychologists, counselors and school therapists. The book was edited by Alan S. Brown, Ph.D., and Chris Logan, and was published on March 1, 2006, by BenBella Books. It has praise from reviewers.

== Background ==
The book was published on March 1, 2006, by BenBella Books, and is part of their "Psychology of Popular Culture Series," or "Smart Pop" for short. Other books in the series include works which analyze psychology and pop culture themes as related to Superman, the X-Men, and The Matrix. The BenBella psychology series was inspired by a similar pop philosophy series from publisher Open Court Publishing Company. The editors of the book were Alan S. Brown, Ph.D., and Chris Logan. Brown is a professor of psychology, and Logan is a lecturer in the field. The book is meant to appeal both to fans of The Simpsons, and academic students of psychology.

== Content ==
The book contains content from twenty-nine contributors, including psychologists, counselors, teachers and school therapists. It also includes content from Brown and Logan. General topics discussed in the work include family, alcohol abuse, relationships, self-esteem, sex and gender, and personality. Specific topics in the field of psychology include clinical psychology, cognition, abnormal psychology, evolutionary psychology, gambling addiction, Pavlovian conditioning and family therapy. Contributor Denis M. McCarthy, assistant professor of psychology at the University of Missouri, analyzes risk factors for alcoholism presented in The Simpsons. McCarthy cites Bart's passive-avoidance learning as a risk factor, and notes that Maggie is at a high risk for substance abuse due to violent tendencies.

Though each chapter contains material comparing The Simpsons episodes to academic psychology themes, the chapter titles are less serious, including "Which One of Us is Truly Crazy" and "Looking For Mr. Smarty Pants." Editor Chris Logan explained: "The book's content is very serious, but it's not presented in an overly serious way." The Simpsons Archive also described the balance between humor and academia in the book, noting: "Fortunately, despite numerous references to various psychological theories and academic studies, the essays steer clear of becoming too serious, and manage to stay entertaining throughout the book."

== Reception ==
The book was received favorably in a publication of Southern Methodist University. In the introduction to an interview with one of the book's editors, the interviewer noted: "Get past the goofy cover, with its illustration of Homer's beer- and TV-saturated brain, and you find analysis aimed at both TV viewers and students of psychology." The book also received positive mention in The Times, where Andrew Billen wrote: "I can commend D'Oh!: The Psychology of The Simpsons and Reading The Sopranos, since both shows are sturdy enough to support the intellectual studies." An article at The Simpsons Archive also wrote positively of the work: "The connection to the show and its events is solid and psychological points are illustrated using explanatory snippets from the Simpsons."

== See also ==
- Lists of The Simpsons publications
- Planet Simpson: How a Cartoon Masterpiece Documented an Era and Defined a Generation
- The Simpsons and Philosophy: The D'oh! of Homer
