= Celebrity =

Fame in mass media

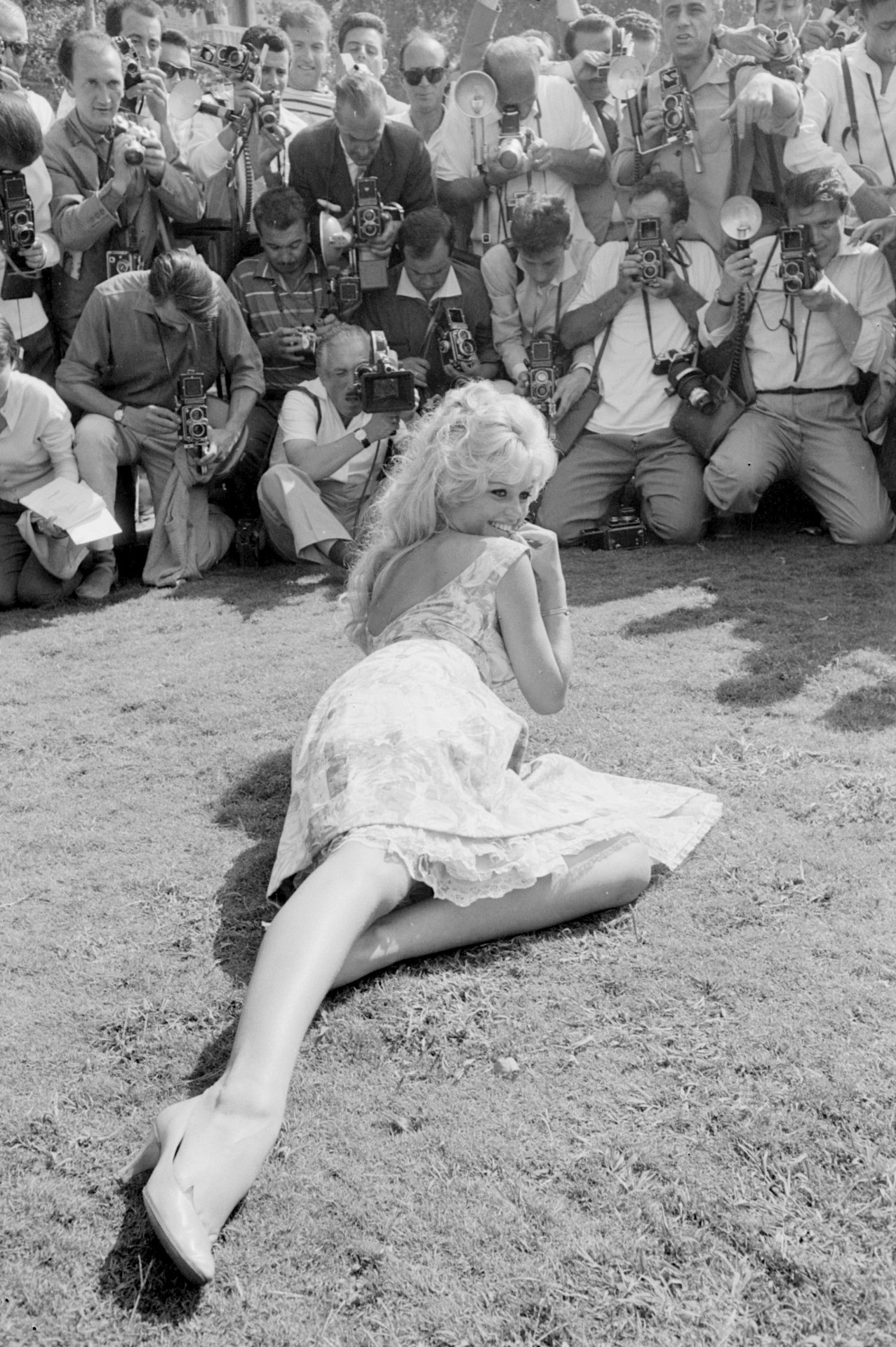
The French celebrity Brigitte Bardot being photographed at the 1958 Venice Film Festival

Celebrity is a condition of fame and broad public recognition of a person or group due to the attention given to them by mass media. The word is also used to refer to famous individuals. A person may attain celebrity status by having great wealth, participation in sports or the entertainment industry, their position as a political figure, or even their connection to another celebrity. 'Celebrity' usually implies a favorable public image, as opposed to the neutrals 'famous' or 'notable', or the negatives 'infamous' and 'notorious'.

== History ==
In his 2020 book Dead Famous: An Unexpected History Of Celebrity, British historian Greg Jenner uses the definition:

Celebrity (noun): a unique persona made widely known to the public via media coverage, and whose life is publicly consumed as dramatic entertainment, and whose commercial brand is made profitable for those who exploit their popularity, and perhaps also for themselves.

Although his book is subtitled "from Bronze Age to Silver Screen", and despite the fact that "Until very recently, sociologists argued that celebrity was invented just over 100 years ago, in the flickering glimmer of early Hollywood" and the suggestion that some medieval saints might qualify, Jenner asserts that the earliest celebrities lived in the early 1700s, his first example being Henry Sacheverell. Over time, the invention of more types of mass media has broadened the ways in which people have become famous.

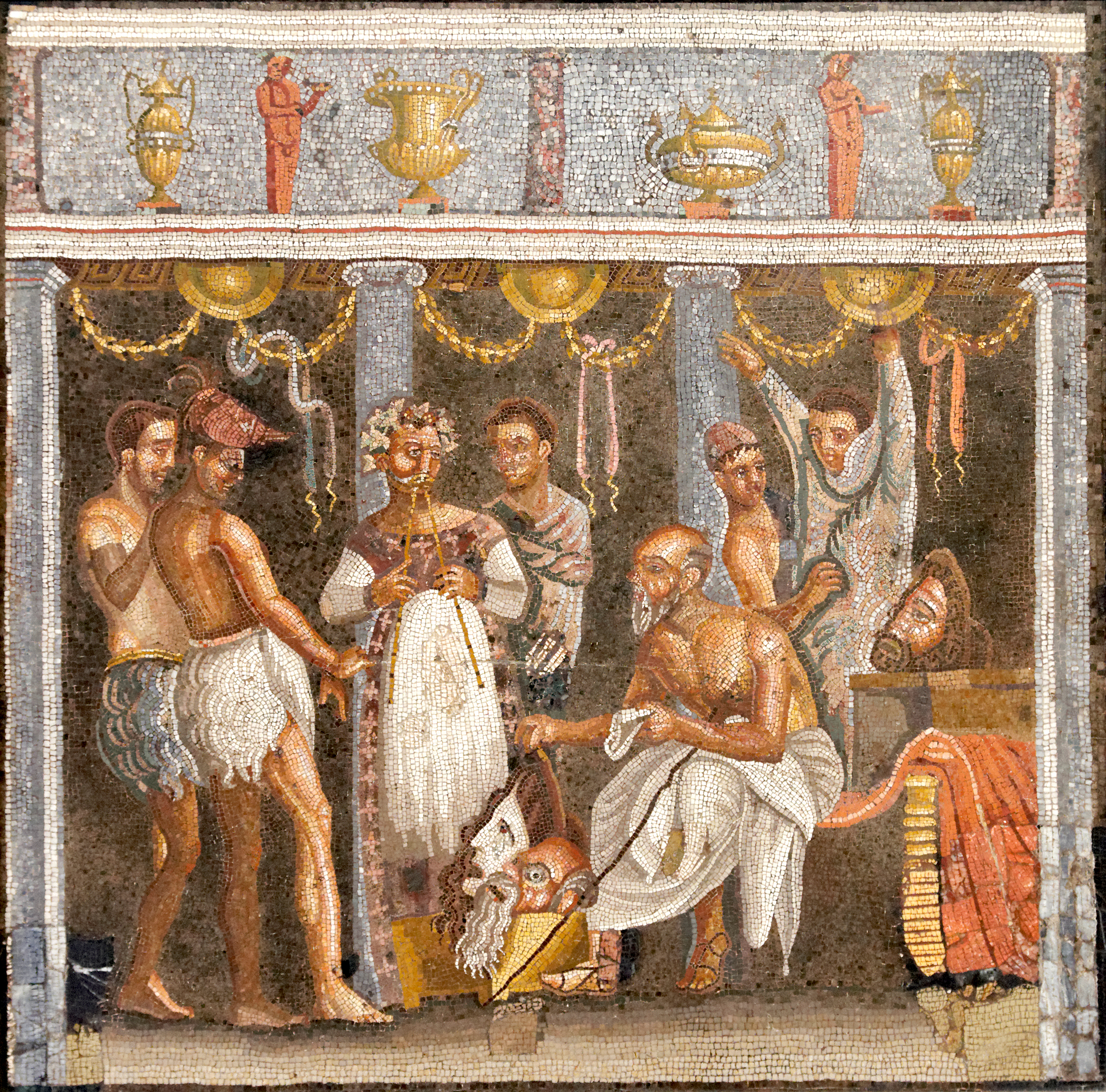
Choregos and theater actors, from the House of the Tragic Poet, Pompeii, Italy. Naples National Archeological Museum.

Athletes in Ancient Greece were welcomed home as heroes, had songs and poems written in their honor, and received free food and gifts from those seeking celebrity endorsement. Ancient Rome similarly lauded actors and notorious gladiators, and Julius Caesar appeared on a coin in his own lifetime (a departure from the usual depiction of battles and divine lineage).

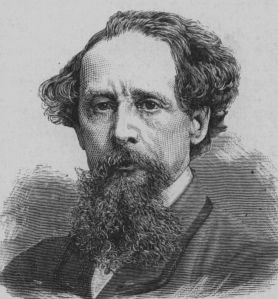
The reaction at Charles Dickens's public readings, where "people sometimes fainted at his shows", have been compared to those of a contemporary pop star.

The cult of personality (particularly in the west) can be traced back to the Romantics in the 18th century, whose livelihood as artists and poets depended on the currency of their reputation. Lord Byron became a celebrity in 1812 after the publication of the first two cantos of Childe Harold's Pilgrimage. "I awoke one morning and found myself famous," he said. According to McGann: "He rapidly became the most brilliant star in the dazzling world of Regency London."

Establishing cultural hot spots became important in generating fame, such as in London and Paris in the 18th and 19th centuries. Newspapers started including "gossip" columns, and certain clubs and events became places to be seen to receive publicity. Madame Tussauds, a museum that displays waxworks of famous figures, was first established in Baker Street, London in 1835, with Punch in 1849 stating: "In these days, no one can be considered positively popular, unless he is admitted into the company of Madame Tussaud's celebrities in Baker Street". David Lodge called Charles Dickens the "first writer to feel the intense pressure of being simultaneously an artist and an object of unrelenting public interest and adulation", and Juliet John backed up the claim for Dickens "to be called the first self-made global media star of the age of mass culture."

Theatrical actors were often considered celebrities. Restaurants near theaters, where actors would congregate, began putting up caricatures or photographs of actors on celebrity walls in the late 19th century. The subject of widespread public and media interest, Lillie Langtry, made her West End theatre debut in 1881 causing a sensation in London by becoming the first socialite to appear on stage. The following year she became the poster-girl for Pears Soap, becoming the first celebrity to endorse a commercial product. In 1895, poet and playwright Oscar Wilde became the subject of "one of the first celebrity trials".

Another example of celebrities in the entertainment industry was in music, beginning in the mid-19th century. Never seen before in music, many people engaged in an immense fan frenzy called Lisztomania that began in 1841. This created the basis for the behavior fans have around their favorite musicians in modern society.

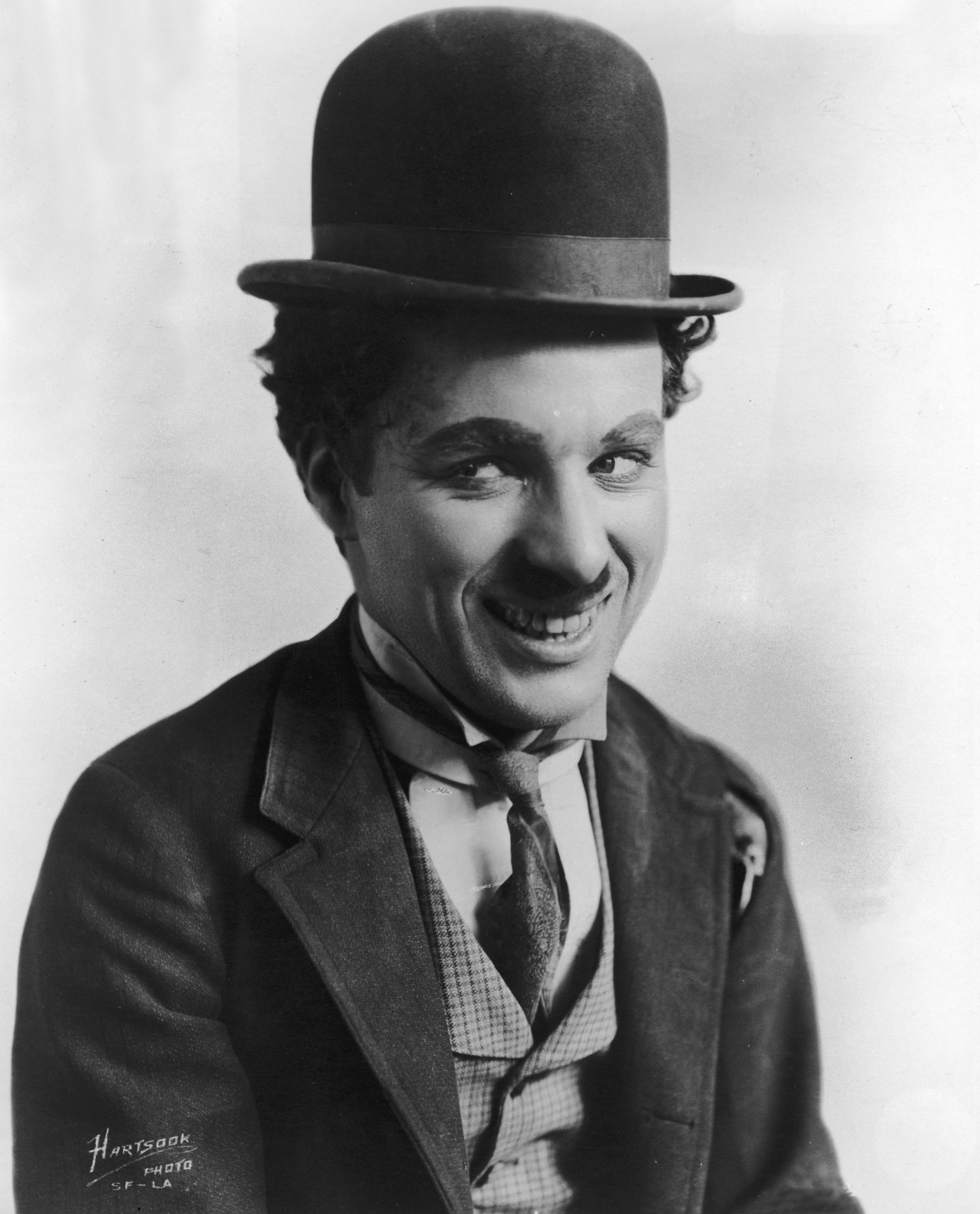
Charlie Chaplin as the Tramp in 1915.

The movie industry spread around the globe in the first half of the 20th century, creating the first film celebrities. The term celebrity was not always tied to actors in films however, especially when cinema was starting as a medium. As Paul McDonald states in The Star System: Hollywood's Production of Popular Identities, "In the first decade of the twentieth century, American film production companies withheld the names of film performers, despite requests from audiences, fearing that public recognition would drive performers to demand higher salaries." Public fascination went well beyond the on-screen exploits of movie stars, and their private lives became headline news: for example, in Hollywood the marriages of Elizabeth Taylor and in Bollywood the affairs of Raj Kapoor in the 1950s. Like theatrical actors before them, movie actors were the subjects of celebrity walls in restaurants they frequented, near movie studios, most notably at Sardi's in Hollywood.

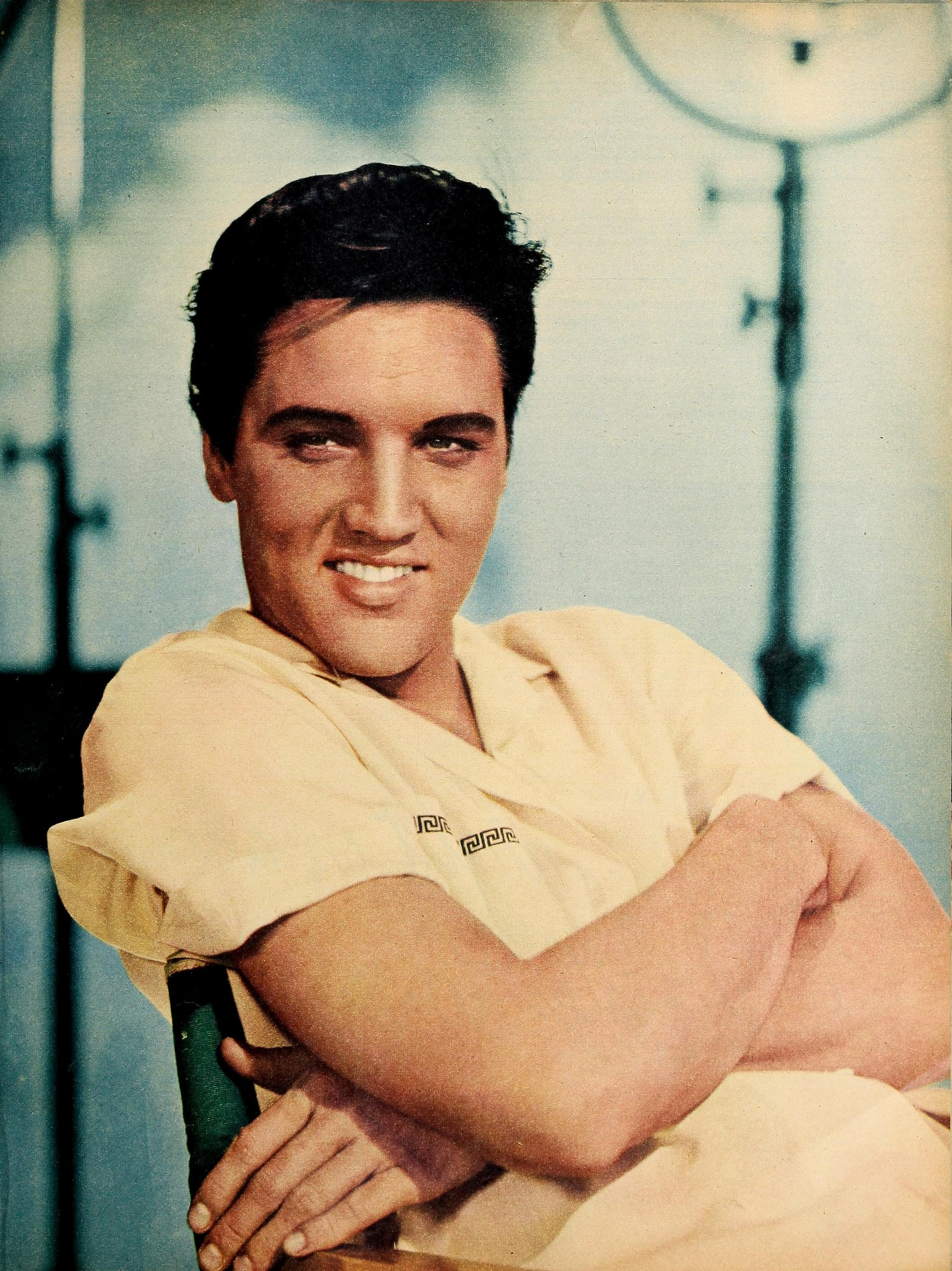
Elvis Presley was a singer and actor whose charismatic performances and distinctive voice revolutionized the music industry.

The second half of the century saw television and popular music bring new forms of celebrity, such as the rock star and the pop group, epitomised by Elvis Presley and the Beatles, respectively. John Lennon's highly controversial 1966 quote: "We're more popular than Jesus now", which he later insisted was not a boast, and that he was not in any way comparing himself with Christ, gives an insight into both the adulation and notoriety that fame can bring. Unlike movies, television created celebrities who were not primarily actors; for example, presenters, talk show hosts, and newsreaders. However, most of these are only famous within the regions reached by their particular broadcaster, and only a few such as Oprah Winfrey, Jerry Springer, or David Frost could be said to have broken through into wider stardom. Television also gave exposure to sportspeople, notably Pelé after his emergence at the 1958 FIFA World Cup, with Barney Ronay in The Guardian stating, "What is certain is that Pelé invented this game, the idea of individual global sporting superstardom, and in a way that is unrepeatable now."

In the '60s and early '70s, the book publishing industry began to persuade major celebrities to put their names on autobiographies and other titles in a genre called celebrity publishing. In most cases, the book was not written by the celebrity but by a ghostwriter, but the celebrity would then be available for a book tour and appearances on talk shows.

== Wealth ==
=== Forbes celebrity lists ===
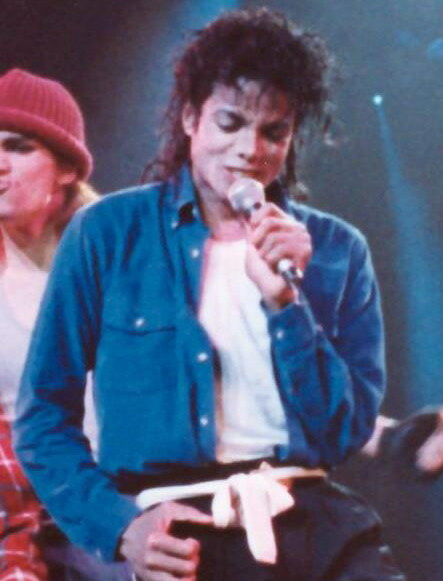
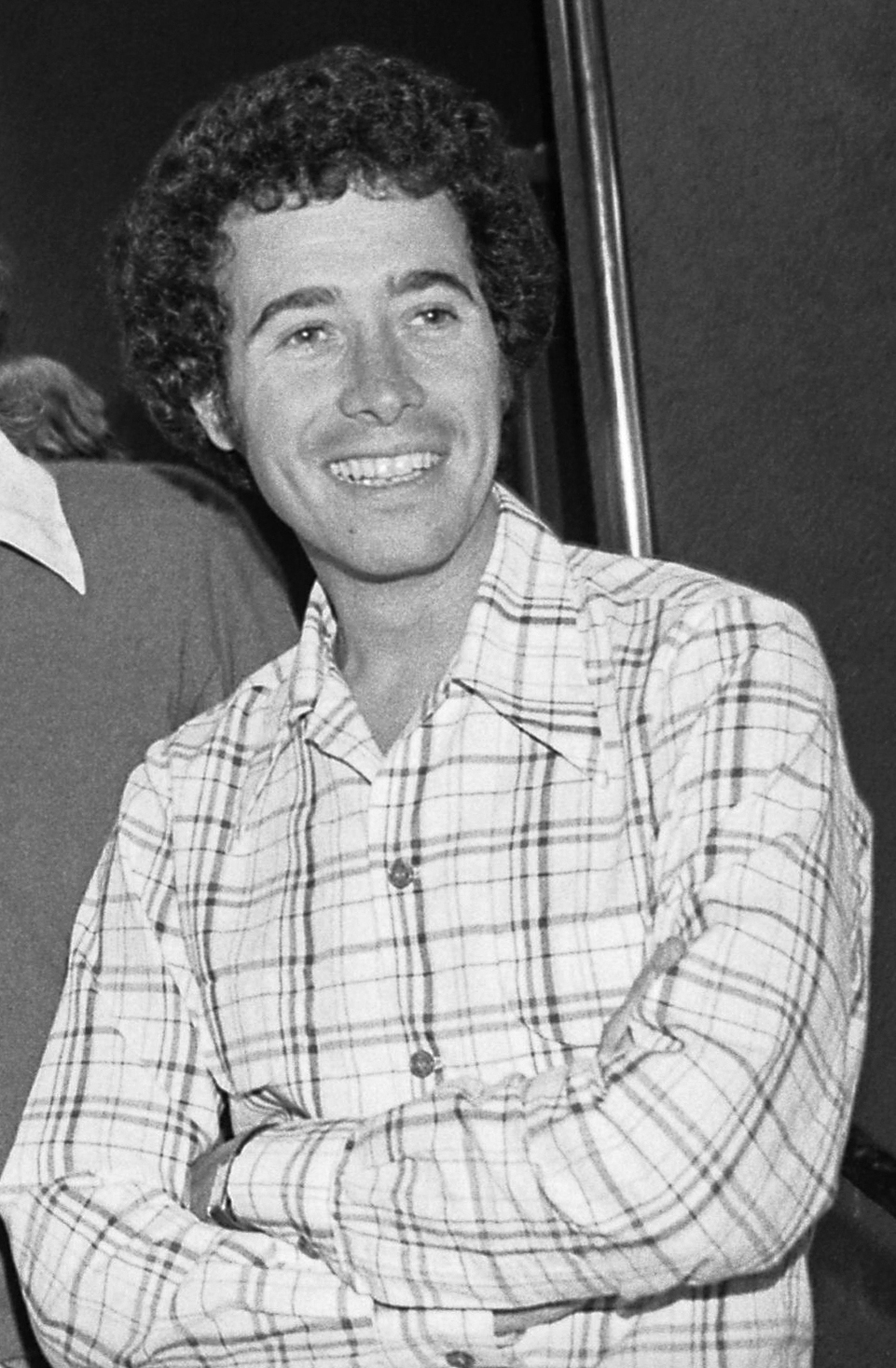
Michael Jackson (left) and David Geffen (right) have dominated main Forbes lists of top-paid dead celebrities, and wealthiest celebrities, respectively

Forbes magazine releases an annual list of the highest-paid celebrities in the world, Forbes Top 40 between 1987-1999, later reacreated as Forbes Celebrity 100. The total earnings for all top celebrity 100 earners totaled $4.5 billion in 2010 alone.

For instance, Forbes ranked media mogul and talk show host, Oprah Winfrey as the top earner "Forbes magazine's annual ranking of the most powerful celebrities", with earnings of $290 million in the past year. Forbes cites that Lady Gaga reportedly earned over $90 million in 2010. In 2011, golfer Tiger Woods was one of highest-earning celebrity athletes, with an income of $74 million and is consistently ranked one of the highest-paid athletes in the world. In 2013, Madonna was ranked as the fifth most powerful and the highest-earning celebrity of the year with earnings of $125 million. She has consistently been among the most powerful and highest-earning celebrities in the world, occupying the third place in Forbes Celebrity 100 2009 with $110 million of earnings, and getting the tenth place in the 2011 edition of the list with annual earnings equal to $58 million. Beyoncé has also appeared in the top ten in 2008, 2009, 2010, 2013, 2017, and topped the list in 2014 with earnings of $115 million. Cristiano Ronaldo followed by Lionel Messi in 2020 became the first two athletes in a team sport to surpass $1 billion in earnings during their careers.

Forbes also lists the top-earning deceased celebrities, with singer Michael Jackson, fantasy author J. R. R. Tolkien and children's author Roald Dahl each topping the annual list with earnings of $500 million over the course of a year.

=== Entrepreneurship and endorsements ===
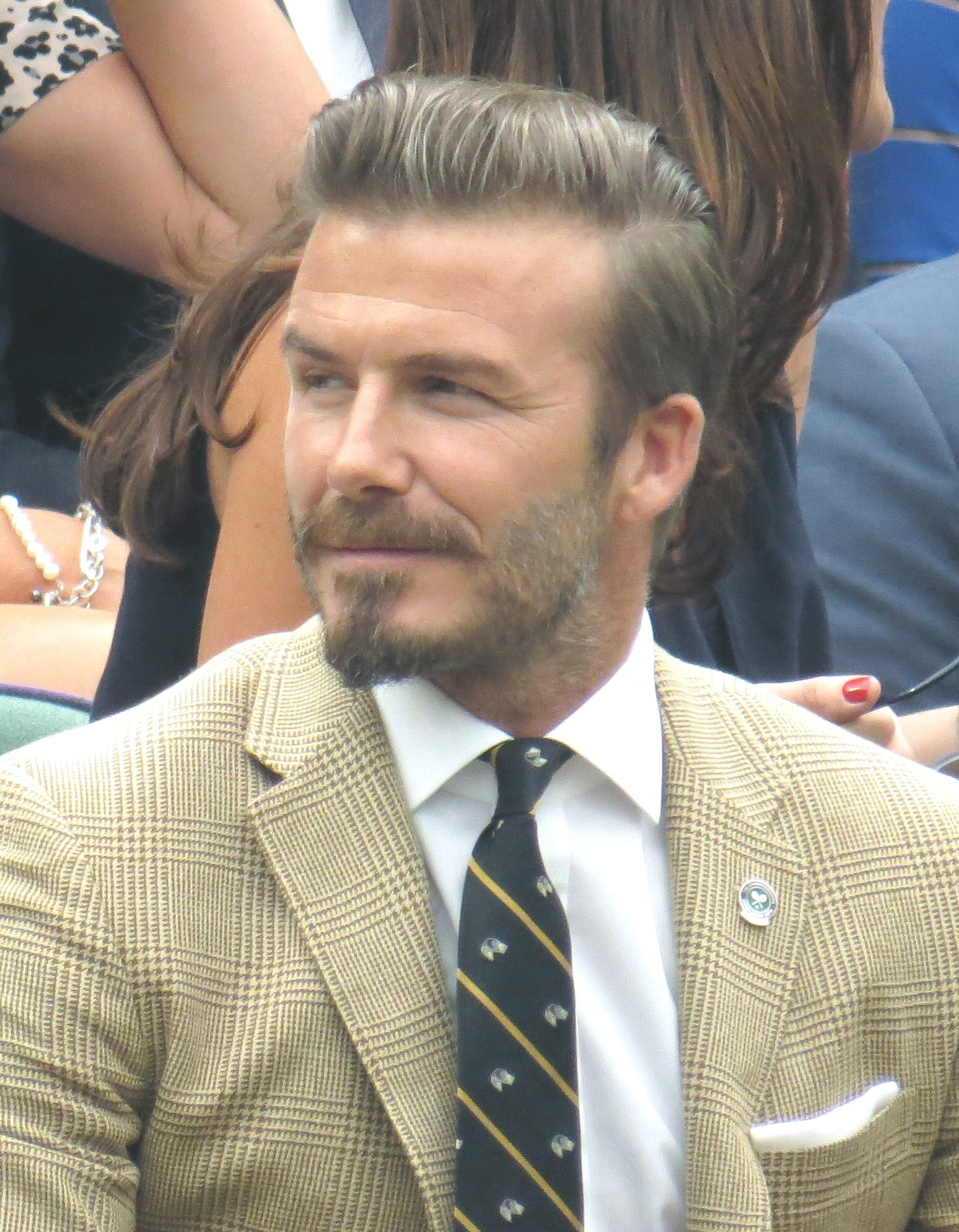
David Beckham is a successful entrepreneur, co-owning the Major League Soccer team Inter Miami and engaging in high-profile endorsements with brands such as Adidas and H&M.

Celebrity endorsements have proven very successful around the world where, due to increasing consumerism, a person owns a "status symbol" by purchasing a celebrity-endorsed product. Although it has become commonplace for celebrities to place their name with endorsements onto products just for quick money, some celebrities have gone beyond merely using their names and have put their entrepreneurial spirit to work by becoming entrepreneurs by attaching themselves in the business aspects of entertainment and building their own business brand beyond their traditional salaried activities. Along with investing their salaried wages into growing business endeavors, several celebrities have become innovative business leaders in their respective industries.

Numerous celebrities have ventured into becoming business moguls and established themselves as entrepreneurs, idolizing many well known business leaders such as Bill Gates, Richard Branson and Warren Buffett. For instance, former basketball player Michael Jordan became an entrepreneur involved with many sports-related ventures including investing a minority stake in the Charlotte Bobcats, Paul Newman started his own salad dressing business after leaving behind a distinguished acting career, and rap musician Birdman started his own record label, clothing line, and an oil business while maintaining a career as a rap artist. In 2014, David Beckham became co-owner of new Major League Soccer team Inter Miami, which began playing in 2020. Former Brazil striker and World Cup winner Ronaldo became the majority owner of La Liga club Real Valladolid in 2018. Other celebrities such as Tyler Perry, George Lucas, and Steven Spielberg have become successful entrepreneurs through starting their own film production companies and running their own movie studios beyond their traditional activities.

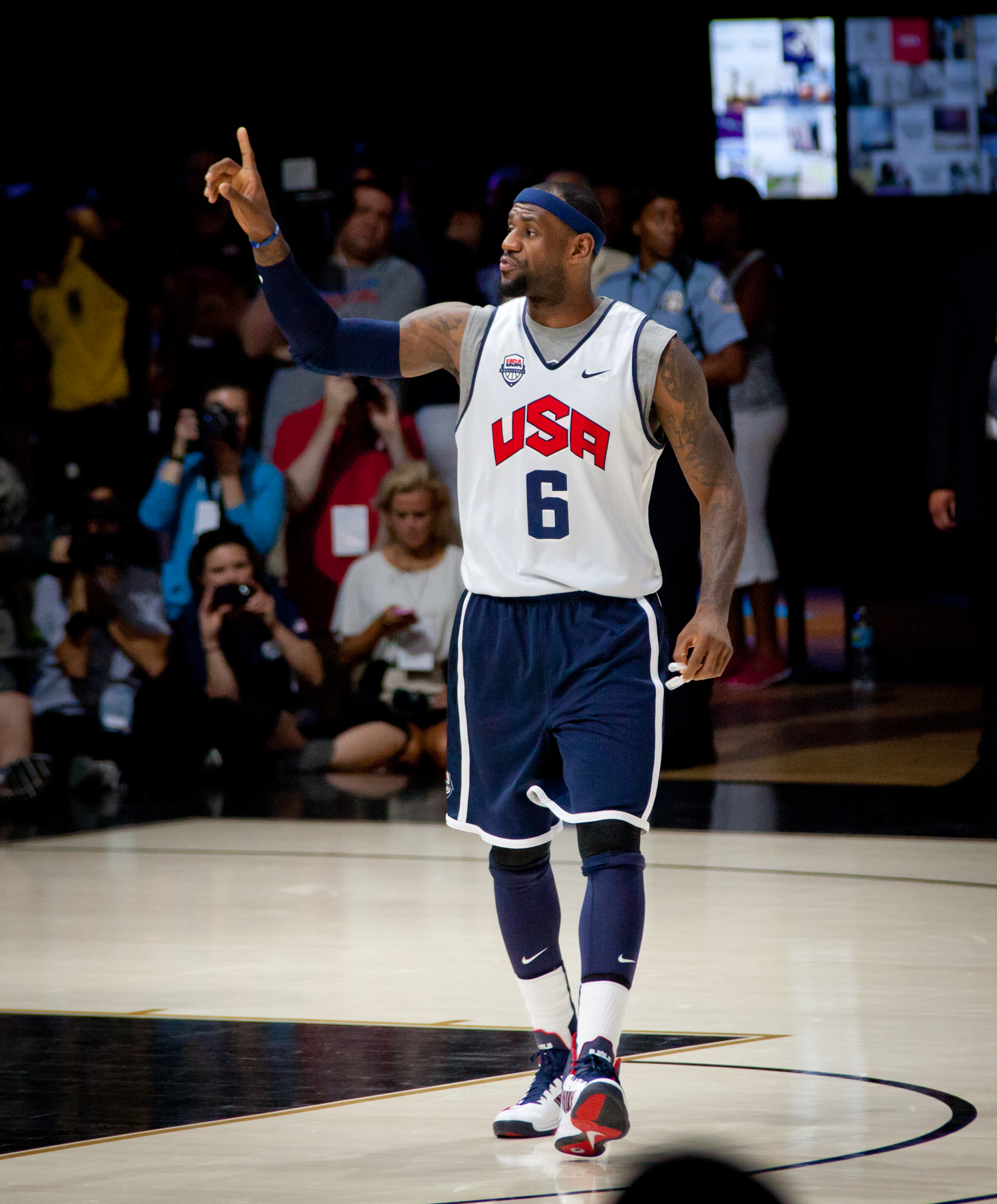
LeBron James has had endorsement contracts with AT&T, The Coca-Cola Company, Crypto.com, General Motors, PepsiCo, McDonald's, Nike, Upper Deck, Walmart, and State Farm.

Tabloid magazines and talk TV shows bestow a great deal of attention to celebrities. To stay in the public eye and build wealth in addition to their salaried labor, numerous celebrities have begun participating and branching into various business ventures and endorsements, which include: animation, publishing, fashion designing, cosmetics, consumer electronics, household items and appliances, cigarettes, soft drinks and alcoholic beverages, hair care, hairdressing, jewelry design, fast food, credit cards, video games, writing, and toys.

In addition to these, some celebrities have been involved with some business and investment-related ventures also include: sports team ownership, fashion retailing, establishments such as restaurants, cafes, hotels, and casinos, movie theaters, advertising and event planning, management-related ventures such as sports management, financial services, model management, and talent management, record labels, film production, television production, publishing books and music, massage therapy, salons, health and fitness, and real estate.

Although some celebrities have achieved additional financial success from various business ventures, the vast majority of celebrities are not successful businesspeople and still rely on salaried labored wages to earn a living. Not all celebrities eventually succeed with their businesses and other related side ventures. Some celebrities either went broke or filed for bankruptcy as a result of dabbling with such side businesses or endorsements.

== Famous for being famous ==
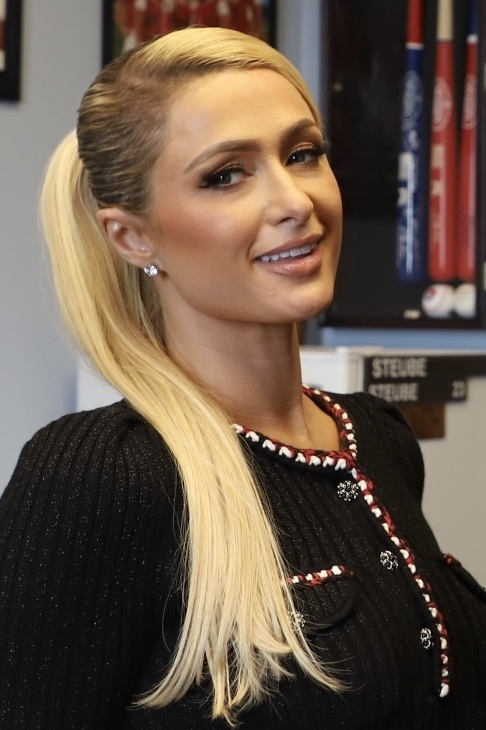
American socialite Paris Hilton is one celebrity that is commonly described as "famous for being famous".

Famous for being famous, in popular culture terminology, refers to someone who attains celebrity status for no particular identifiable reason, or who achieves fame through association with a celebrity. The term is a pejorative, suggesting the target has no particular talents or abilities. British journalist Malcolm Muggeridge made the first known usage of the phrase in the introduction to his book Muggeridge Through The Microphone: BBC Radio and Television (1967) in which he wrote:

In the past if someone was famous or notorious, it was for something—as a writer or an actor or a criminal; for some talent or distinction or abomination. Today one is famous for being famous. People who come up to one in the street or in public places to claim recognition nearly always say: "I've seen you on the telly!"

The coinages "famesque" and "celebutante" are of similar pejorative gist.

This shift has sparked criticism for promoting superficial recognition over substantive achievements and reflects broader changes in how fame and success are perceived in modern culture.

== Mass media phenomena ==
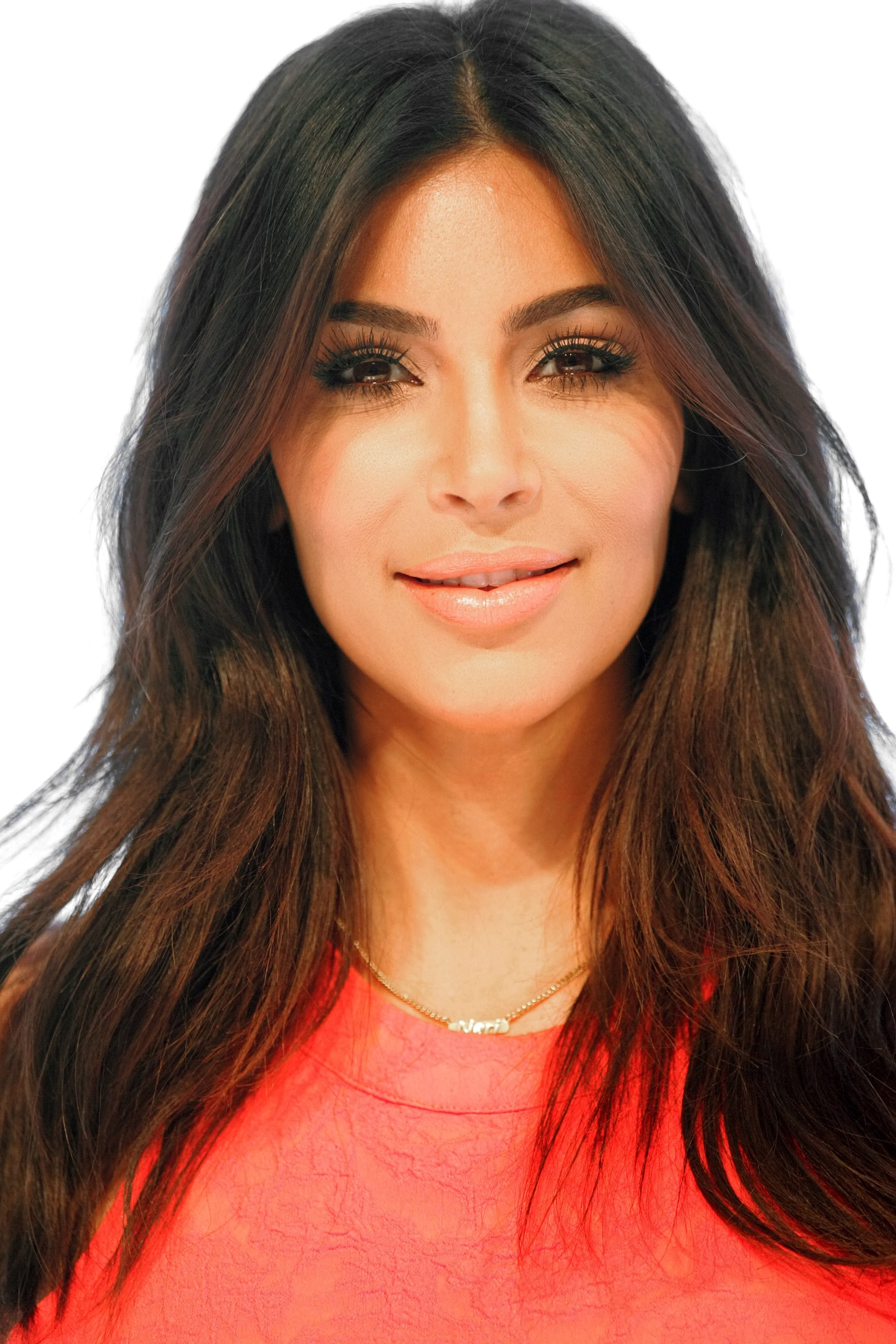
Kim Kardashian rose to fame through reality TV and social media,.

Celebrities may be resented for their accolades, and the public may have a love/hate relationship with celebrities. Due to the high visibility of celebrities' private lives, their successes and shortcomings are often made very public. Celebrities are alternately portrayed as glowing examples of perfection, when they garner awards, or as decadent or immoral if they become associated with a scandal. When seen in a positive light, celebrities are frequently portrayed as possessing skills and abilities beyond average people; for example, celebrity actors are routinely celebrated for acquiring new skills necessary for filming a role within a very brief time, and to a level that amazes the professionals who train them. Similarly, some celebrities with very little formal education can sometimes be portrayed as experts on complicated issues. Some celebrities have been very vocal about their political views. For example, Matt Damon expressed his displeasure with 2008 US vice presidential nominee Sarah Palin, as well as with the 2011 United States debt-ceiling crisis.

== Internet ==
Also known as being internet famous.

=== Social networking and video hosting ===
Most high-profile celebrities participate in social networking services and photo or video hosting platforms such as YouTube, Twitter, Facebook, Instagram, and Snapchat. Social networking services allow celebrities to communicate directly with their fans, removing the "traditional" media. Through social media, many people outside of the entertainment and sports sphere become a celebrity in their own sphere. Social media humanizes celebrities in a way that arouses public fascination as evident by the success of magazines such as Us Weekly and People Weekly. Celebrity blogging has also spawned stars such as Perez Hilton who is known for not only blogging but also outing celebrities.

Social media and the rise of the smartphone has changed how celebrities are treated and how people gain the platform of fame. Websites like Twitter, Facebook, Instagram, and YouTube allow people to become a celebrity in a different manner. For example, Justin Bieber got his start on YouTube by posting videos of him singing. His fans were able to directly contact him through his content and were able to interact with him on several social media platforms. The internet, as said before, also allows fans to connect with their favorite celebrity without ever meeting them in person.

Social media sites have also contributed to the fame of certain celebrities, such as Tila Tequila who became known through MySpace.

=== Asia ===
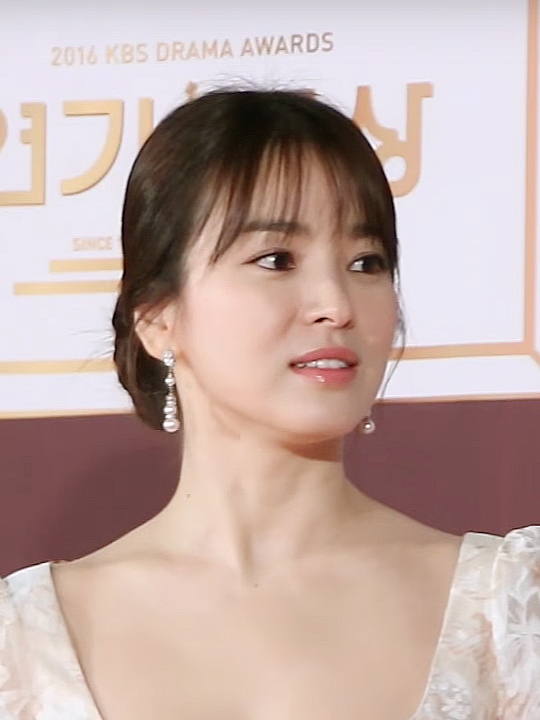
Song Hye-kyo is a renowned South Korean actress celebrated for her roles in acclaimed dramas like Autumn in My Heart and Descendants of the Sun.

A report by the BBC highlighted a longtime trend of Asian internet celebrities called Wanghong in Chinese. According to the BBC, there are two kinds of online celebrities in China—those who create original content, such as Papi Jiang, who is regularly censored by Chinese authorities for cursing in her videos, and Wanghongs fall under the second category, as they have clothing and cosmetics businesses on Taobao, China's equivalent of Amazon.

== Access restriction ==
Access to celebrities is strictly controlled by the celebrities entourage of staff which includes managers, publicists, agents, personal assistants, and bodyguards. Journalists may even have difficulty accessing celebrities for interviews. Writer and actor Michael Musto said, "You have to go through many hoops just to talk to a major celebrity. You have to get past three different sets of publicists: the publicist for the event, the publicist for the movie, and then the celebrity's personal publicist. They all have to approve you."

Celebrities also typically have security staff at their home or properties, to protect them and their belongings from similar threats.

== "Fifteen minutes of fame" ==
"15 minutes of fame" is a phrase often used as slang to short-lived publicity. Certain "15 minutes of fame" celebrities can be average people seen with an A-list celebrity, who are sometimes noticed on entertainment news channels such as E! News. These are ordinary people becoming celebrities, often based on the ridiculous things they do.

"In fact, many reality show contestants fall into this category: the only thing that qualifies them to be on TV is that they're real."

== Health implications ==
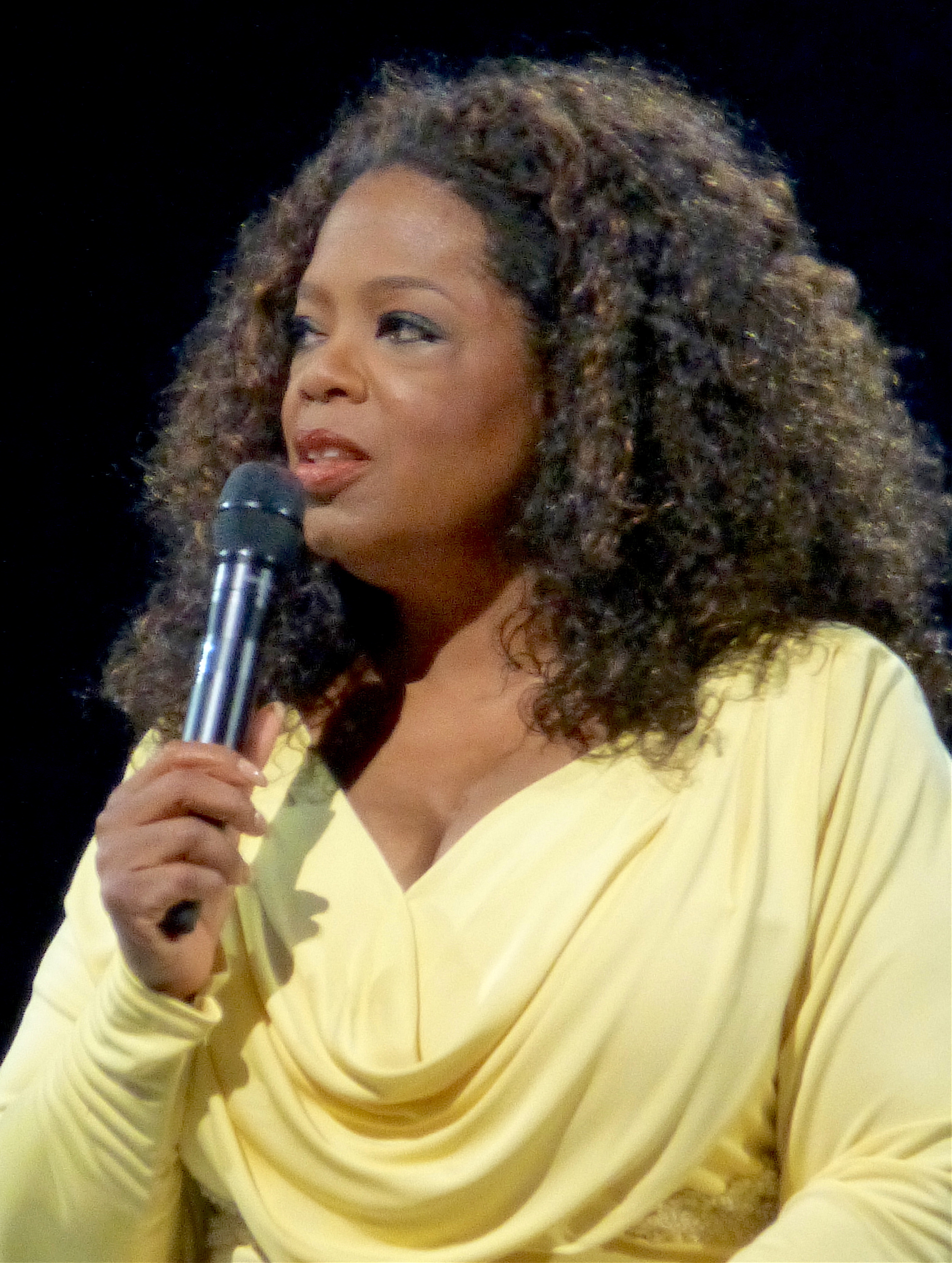
Oprah Winfrey is known for her impactful health and wellness advice, particularly through The Oprah Winfrey Show and her various media ventures.

Common threats such as stalking have spawned celebrity worship syndrome where a person becomes overly involved with the details of a celebrity's personal life. Psychologists have indicated that though many people obsess over glamorous film, television, sport and music stars, the disparity in salaries in society seems to value professional athletes and entertainment industry-based professionals. One study found that singers, musicians, actors and athletes die younger on average than writers, composers, academics, politicians and businesspeople, with a greater incidence of cancer and especially lung cancer. However, it was remarked that the reasons for this remained unclear, with theories including innate tendencies towards risk-taking as well as the pressure or opportunities of particular types of fame.

Fame might have negative psychological effects. An academic study on the subject said that fame has an addictive quality to it. When a celebrity's fame recedes over time, the celebrity may find it difficult to adjust psychologically.

As of 2015, there has been growing research towards the impact celebrities have on the general population's health decisions. It is believed that the public will follow celebrities' health advice to some extent. This can have positive impacts when the celebrities give solid, evidence-informed health advice, however, it can also have detrimental effects if the health advice is not accurate enough.

== See also ==
- Acquired situational narcissism
- All-star
- Celebrity bond
- Celebrity branding
- Celebrity Worship Syndrome
- Cult of personality
- Diva
- Fame in the 20th century
- Farce
- Glamour
- Infamy
- Infotainment
- Invision Agency
- List of celebrities
- List of celebrities with advanced degrees
- List of celebrity inventors
- List of entertainment industry topics
- Look-alike
- Q Score
- Radio personality
- Scientific celebrity
- Selling out
- Superstar
- Teen Idol

== General and cited references ==
- Goldman, Jonathan (2011) Modernism Is the Literature of Celebrity. Austin: University of Texas Press, 2011. ISBN 978-0-292-72339-9.
- Grinin, Leonid (2009) "'People of Celebrity' as a New Social Stratum and Elite". In Hierarchy and Power in the History of Civilizations: Cultural Dimensions (pp. 183–206). Ed. by Leonid E. Grinin and Andrey V. Korotayev. Moscow: KRASAND/Editorial URSS, 2009.
- Miles, Barry (1997). Paul McCartney: Many Years from Now. Henry Holt & Company. ISBN 978-0-436-28022-1.
- Schikel, Richard. Intimate Strangers: The Culture of Celebrity. New York: Doubleday, 1985. ISBN 0-385-12336-1.
