= Lists of The Simpsons topics =

This is a lists of The Simpsons topics.

== List ==
- List of The Simpsons books, a list of books related to The Simpsons
- List of The Simpsons cast members
- List of The Simpsons characters
- List of The Simpsons comics, a list of comics related to The Simpsons
- List of The Simpsons episodes
- List of The Simpsons episodes (seasons 1–20)
- List of The Simpsons episodes (season 21–present)
- List of The Simpsons guest stars (seasons 1–20)
- List of The Simpsons guest stars (seasons 21–present)
- List of The Simpsons home video releases
- List of The Simpsons Treehouse of Horror episodes
- List of The Simpsons video games
- List of The Simpsons writers
- List of awards and nominations received by The Simpsons
- List of celebrities in The Simpsons
- List of directors of The Simpsons
- List of recurring The Simpsons characters

== See also ==
- Bibliography of works on The Simpsons
- Simpsons Illustrated, a magazine about The Simpsons
