= The Simpsons and Philosophy =

2001 non-fiction book

The Simpsons and Philosophy: The D'oh! of Homer
- Book cover
- Author: William Irwin, Mark T. Conard, Aeon J. Skoble
- Illustrator: Joan Sommers Design
- Language: English
- Series: Popular Culture and Philosophy (Vol. 2)
- Subject: Philosophy, The Simpsons
- Genre: Non-fiction
- Publisher: Open Court
- Publication date: February 28, 2001
- Publication place: United States
- Pages: 256
- ISBN: 0-8126-9433-3
- Preceded by: Seinfeld and Philosophy: A Book about Everything and Nothing
- Followed by: The Matrix and Philosophy

The Simpsons and Philosophy: The D'oh! of Homer is a non-fiction book analyzing the philosophy and popular culture effects of the American animated sitcom, The Simpsons, published by Open Court. The book is edited by William Irwin, Mark T. Conard and Aeon J. Skoble, each of whom also wrote one of the eighteen essays in the book.

The book was released on February 28, 2001, as the second volume of Open Court Publishing's Popular Culture and Philosophy series, which currently includes eighty books. The book has gone on to be extremely successful, both in sales and critically, and is also used as a main text in various universities with philosophy courses.

== Contents ==
The book includes contributions from eighteen academics in the field of philosophy. Topics included are comparisons of the characters in the show, such as Homer Simpson and Aristotle, or Bart Simpson and Friedrich Nietzsche. The book brings up topics such as why Homer's appeal is universal by arguing that he speaks to fundamental conflicts about what gives human pleasure.

Other topics include the manner in which the show makes philosophical statements, and its opinions on sexuality in politics. Religion is also discussed in the book, such as the guilt Homer feels for not going to church, or Ned Flanders experiencing tragedies, despite following the Bible closely.

== Reception ==
The book was highly successful, selling over 203,000 copies, making it the best selling book in the Open Court Publishing's Popular Culture and Philosophy series. The book was also critically successful, highlighting the philosophical themes that the book was able to make with The Simpsons, such as Booklist, who wrote, "[...]these pieces make erudite concepts accessible by viewing things through the lens of a great cartoon series," or Publishers Weekly who wrote, "Fans of The Simpsons are certain to find this book to be the perfect rebuttal for those who dismiss the show as a no-brainer."

At Siena Heights University a course titled "Animated Philosophy and Religion" uses the book as one of the main texts in order to help teach philosophy. The book has been praised for being able to make connections to philosophical studies and to youth, by using popular culture. The professors who use the book say the book "helps draw people to philosophy." A course titled "Simpsons and Philosophy", devoted entirely to the show & philosophy, is offered at the University of California, Berkeley as part of the university's controversial DeCal program in which students take courses taught by their peers.

Steve Carroll of The Age criticized the book and others like it for watering down philosophical content while making tenuous connections with popular themes in order to maximize appeal to consumers. The book was satirized in an article titled "The 'Popular Culture and Philosophy' Books and Philosophy: Philosophy, You’ve Officially Been Pimped", in the online journal Flow TV.

== See also ==
- Lists of The Simpsons publications
- Planet Simpson: How a Cartoon Masterpiece Documented an Era and Defined a Generation
- The Psychology of The Simpsons
