= Invision Studios =

Film production company

Invision Studios (Pvt) Ltd
- Company type: Private
- Industry: Motion picture
- Founded: August 2013
- Founder: Charles Mugaviri, Jr. Blessing Chinanga; Denise Edwards
- Headquarters: Harare, Zimbabwe
- Key people: Charles Mugaviri, Jr. Blessing Chinanga; Denise Edwards; Shaun Mundawarara
- Website: www.invisionworld.com

Invision Studios is a film production company based in Harare, Zimbabwe. The company was founded by filmmakers Charles Mugaviri Jr., Blessing Chinanga and Denise Edwards in May 2013.

== History ==
In January 2014, Edwards, Chinanga and Mugaviri created a platform called “In Short” where they invited amateur and aspiring filmmakers and screenwriters to send in their scripts, and direct their first short films with directing and producing assistance from the Invision founders. Invision Studios would produce 4-6 short films a month and would screen them at Book Cafe on the last Wednesday of every month. The Studio initiated to help launch people's film careers by aiding them with a crew, equipment and post-production guidance for free.

Invision Studios got assistance from the European Union and Pamberi Trust to cover production costs. The partnerships with the two entities helped the filmmakers’ group to travel to Chinhoyi, Masvingo, Gweru and Bulawayo producing short films they would have collaborated on with new filmmakers. In total, they produced over 38 short films in the 8 months In Short was running.

== Productions ==
Invision Studios has produced several TV show productions that have been distributed and broadcast on M-Net's Zambezi Magic and ZBC (Zimbabwe Broadcasting Corporation).

=== Far From Yesterday (2015) ===
In February 2015, Edwards, Chinanga and Mugaviri started developing a story for a screenplay titled Far From Yesterday. The screenplay, originally written and conceptualized by Denise Edwards in 2013, got into production half a month later. The film, which was produced over 3 months, starred Jonathan Denga, John Cole, Denise Edwards, Gani Phiri, Stacy Danana and Hannah Madzikanda. Ammara Brown was cast to feature in the film as well, making it her debut role in the film industry.

Far From Yesterday earned Hannah Madzikanda her first award for Actress of the Year at the Zimbabwe International Women's Awards at the age of seven. It made her the youngest award-winning child actress in Zimbabwe, beating several acclaimed Zimbabwean actresses to land the award. The feature film is airing on M-Net's Mzansi Wethu channel.

=== Wine & Dine with Tumi (2015) ===
In July 2015 Blessing, Charles and Denise began developing their first TV show concept. A cook show and artist-interview idea where at play, and what resulted was Wine & Dine with Tumi. The show was hosted by Tumi Moleko and featured high-profile Zimbabwean personalities who would cook a meal with the host and share some wine whilst conversing. At the time the production was wrapped, Multi-Choice had just launched its new channel, Zambezi Magic, dedicated to the Southern African region and bought the broadcasting license for Wine & Dine with Tumi, making it one of the first of two TV shows from Zimbabwe on the new channel, the other being Tonight with Zororo.

=== Wedding Diaries (2016) ===
In February 2016 Invision Studios began production for a TV show titled Wedding Diaries. The concept was developed by Denise Edwards and the show was produced by Blessing Chinanga. The show themes around married couples and how they organized their weddings. The show features wedding planner Kevin Zhou and Evan Mawarire giving marriage counselling advice. The TV show was licensed by Multi-Choice to air on its Zambezi Magic channel.

=== Captain Mfombi (2019 - Present) ===
Captain Mfombi is Zimbabwe’s first superhero web series which is a creation of Charles Mugaviri Jr, Shaun Mundawarara, Denise Edwards and Blessing Chinanga which stars beat boxer cum rapper Pro Beatz, a Mufakose native. The series was launched late January 2021 on YouTube via the Pano TV channel bringing a local flair to the superhero scene.
