= List of social thinkers =

This article provides a list of social thinkers.

The title social thinker denotes a person who is acknowledged as a visionary for social advancement.

== B ==
- Dharamvir Bharati
- Subhash Chandra Bose
- Jacob Burckhardt

== D ==
- Lloyd deMause
- Dr. Bhimrao Ramji Ambedkar

== G ==
- Mahatma Gandhi
- Maurice Glasman, Baron Glasman
- Ziya Gökalp

== H ==
- Spencer Heath

== I ==
- Ivan Illich
- Muhammad Iqbal

== J ==
- Jose Rizal

== K ==
- Rajani Kannepalli Kanth

== M ==
- Karl Marx

== N ==
- Vartika Nanda
- Shankar Guha Niyogi

== O ==
- Adriano Olivetti

== P ==
- Kesari Balakrishna Pillai
- Caroline Pratt

== R ==
- Jean-Jacques Rousseau
- John Ruskin

== S ==
- Henri de Saint-Simon
- George Bernard Shaw
- Rudolf Steiner

== T ==
- Debendranath Tagore
- R. H. Tawney

== U ==
- Roberto Mangabeira Unger

== V ==
- Thorstein Veblen

== Y ==
- Ivan Yefremov
