= List of celebrity inventors =

The following is a list of celebrity inventors and their patents. (For the purposes of this article, an inventor is a person who has been granted a patent.) After Google released a patent search online in December 2006, a website called Ironic Sans, made the public aware of a number of celebrity patents found through the new patent search engine.

Additional lists of inventors can be found at List of inventors. See also Category:Inventors.

== A ==
- George Antheil, U.S. patent 2,292,387 — with co-inventor Hedy Lamarr, used a code (stored on punched paper tape) to synchronize random frequencies later known as frequency hopping spread spectrum radio for jam-proof remote control of torpedoes. This work led to their posthumous induction into the National Inventors Hall of Fame in 2014.

== B ==
- Marlon Brando, U.S. patent 6,812,392 — Drumhead tensioning device and method. An invention which makes it possible to tune a drum.
- Gary Burghoff, U.S. patent 5,235,774 — Enhanced fish attractor device. A way of luring fish up closer, to attract them, so they are easier to fish.

== C ==
- Harry Connick, Jr., U.S. patent 6,348,648 — System and method for coordinating music display among players in an orchestra. An electronic system, a device with a screen, used to show the sheet music for the musicians, for example in an orchestra, while they are playing, instead of the more commonly used paper. Connick uses this system when performing with his big band.
- Jamie Lee Curtis, U.S. patent 4,753,647 — Infant garment. A disposable baby diaper with pockets containing one or more removable clean-up wipers.

== D ==
- Walt Disney
  - U.S. patent 2,201,689 — Art of animation. A device/method that allows the animator to, for example, make a more realistic looking shadow for a moving character in an animation.
  - U.S. patent 2,942,516 — Panoramic motion picture presentation arrangement (co-invented with Ub Iwerks). A method of presenting a continuous motion picture on a circular screen, also known as Circle-Vision 360°.

== F ==
- Charles Fleischer, U.S. patent 4,219,959 — Toy egg. A toy adapted for pulling, stretching, and bouncing which includes two intertwined helically cut shells.

== G ==
- Uri Geller, U.S. patent 5,726,383 — Telephone radiation shield (co-inventor). A radiation shield for cellular phones.
- Enver Gjokaj, U.S. patent 8,121,471 — Focusing system for motion picture camera.

== H ==
- Harry Houdini, U.S. patent 1,370,316 — Diver's suit. A new type of diving suit that is easier to put on and take off, and is able to better handle water pressure.
- Howard Hughes, — Steel bra.
- Jamie Hyneman, U.S. patent 6,458,008 — Remote control device with gyroscopic stabilization and directional control.

== J ==
- Michael Jackson, U.S. patent 5,255,452 — Method and means for creating anti-gravity illusion (co-inventor).
- Penn Jillette, U.S. patent 5,920,923 — Hydro-therapeutic stimulator. A spa designed to stimulate a female user with water jets.
- John Arthur ("Jack") Johnson, U.S. patent 1,413,121 — Wrench. An adjustable wrench designed to be taken apart for easy cleaning.

== K ==
- Danny Kaye, U.S. patent D166807 — Blowout toy or the like (co-inventor)

== L ==
- Hedy Lamarr, U.S. patent 2,292,387 — with co-inventor George Antheil, frequency hopping spread spectrum radio for jam-proof remote control of torpedoes. This work led to their induction into the National Inventors Hall of Fame in 2014.
- Abraham Lincoln, U.S. patent 6,469 — [method for] Buoying vessels over shoals.
- George Lucas
  - U.S. patent D264109 — Toy action figure (co-inventor, with Ralph McQuarrie, Joe Johnston). The ornamental design for a Boba Fett toy action figure.
  - U.S. patent D265108 — Toy figure (co-inventor, with McQuarrie, Phil Tippett). The ornamental design for a tauntaun toy figure.
  - U.S. patent D265109 — Toy figure (co-inventor, with Stuart Freeborn, McQuarrie). The ornamental design for a toy figure.
  - U.S. patent D265330 — Toy figure (co-inventor, with McQuarrie, Johnston). The ornamental design for a droid toy figure.
  - U.S. patent D265331 — Toy figure (co-inventor, with McQuarrie). The ornamental design for an IG-88 toy figure.
  - U.S. patent D265332 — Toy figure (co-inventor, with McQuarrie, Johnston). The ornamental design for a snowtrooper toy figure.
  - U.S. patent D265668 — Toy space vehicle (co-inventor, with Johnston). The ornamental design for a twin-pod cloud car toy.
  - U.S. patent D265754 — Toy figure (co-inventor, with McQuarrie, Johnston, Freeborn). The ornamental design for a Yoda toy figure.
  - U.S. patent D266685 — Toy figure (co-inventor, with Freeborn and McQuarrie). The ornamental design for a Greedo toy figure.
  - U.S. patent D266777 — Toy vehicle (co-inventor, with Johnston). The ornamental design for an AT-AT toy.
  - U.S. patent D267025 — Toy space vehicle (co-inventor, with McQuarrie and Johnston). The ornamental design for a snowspeeder toy.

== M ==
- Zeppo Marx, U.S. patent 3,473,526 — Cardiac pulse rate monitor (co-inventor)
- Steve McQueen, U.S. patent D219813 — Bucket seat shell

== N ==
- Julie Newmar, U.S. patent 3,914,799 — Pantyhose with shaping band for cheeky derriere relief.

== P ==
- Prince, U.S. patent D349127 — Portable electronic keyboard musical instrument. The ornamental design for a portable electronic keyboard musical instrument.

== S ==
- Steven Spielberg, U.S. patent D401951 — Dolly track switch (co-inventor)

== T ==
- Mark Twain
  - U.S. patent 121,992 — Improvement in adjustable and detachable straps for garments.
  - U.S. patent 140,245 — Improvement in scrap-books.
  - U.S. patent 324,535 — Game apparatus.

== V ==
- Eddie Van Halen, U.S. patent 4,656,917 — Musical instrument support.

== W ==
- Lawrence Welk, U.S. patent D170898 — Ash tray.
- Paul Winchell
  - U.S. patent 3,042,086 — Device for filling blood containers.
  - U.S. patent 3,063,235 — Warning indicator for interrupted power supply for freezers.
  - U.S. patent 3,063,563 — Tandem sifter for flour and other products.
  - U.S. patent 3,071,113 — Retractable fountain pen.
  - U.S. patent 3,077,177 — Warning indicators for interrupted power supply of freezers.
  - U.S. patent 3,079,160 — Guideway selector for multi-track records.
  - U.S. patent 3,079,486 — Electrical heater for a container.
  - U.S. patent 3,097,366 — Artificial heart.
  - U.S. patent 3,110,424 — Pouring expediter for sugar, salt and the like.
  - U.S. patent 3,110,501 — Laminated disc pad phonograph records.
  - U.S. patent 3,120,192 — Hand pump for transferring liquids.
  - U.S. patent 3,128,477 — Non-bulging garter fastener.
  - U.S. patent 3,129,001 — Inverted novelty mask.
  - U.S. patent 3,133,140 — Lens cover.
  - U.S. patent 3,809,463 — Animation cells [sic] and technique.
  - U.S. patent D216371 — Jewelry pendant or similar article. A design combining the Star of David with the Christian cross.

== See also ==
- Inventor (patent)
