= List of directors of The Simpsons =

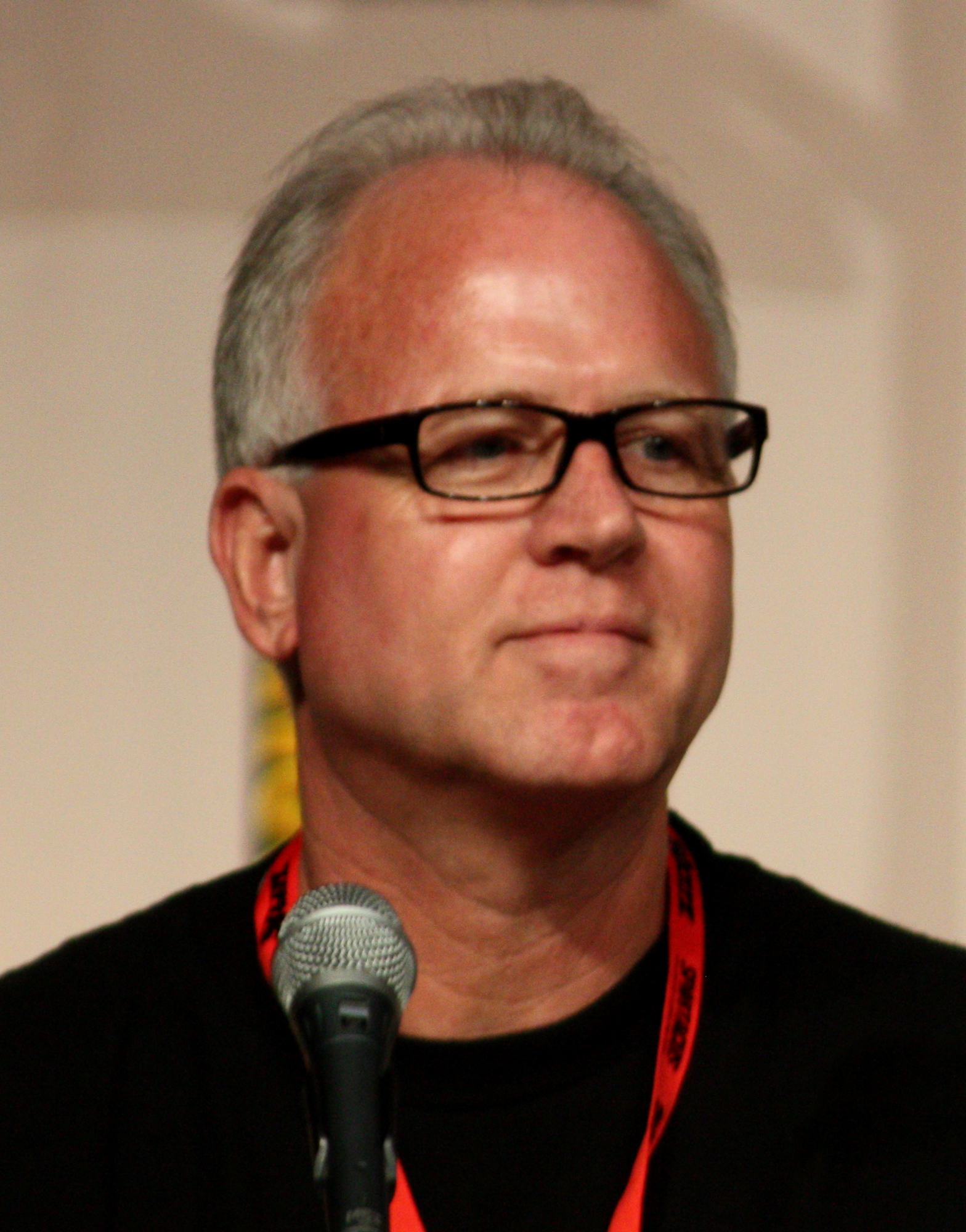
Mike B. Anderson, the show's current supervising director.

The following is a list of directors who have worked on the Fox animated television series The Simpsons in the order of first credited episode (by broadcast). As of November 15, 2026, 43 people have been credited with directing or co-directing at least one episode of The Simpsons.

== List of directors ==
#	Director	Number directed	Duration	Seasons	Notes
1	David Silverman	25	1989–95, 2002, 2004–06, 2015, 2026	1–7, 14, 16–18, 26, 38	Includes one co-directed with Kent Butterworth and one with Matthew Faughnan; Also directed The Simpsons Movie, The Longest Daycare, Playdate with Destiny, all the Disney+ shorts and The Simpsons Balenciaga; The only person ever to both write and direct for the show
2	Wes Archer	26	1990–96	1–7	Includes one co-directed with Milton Gray
3	Gregg Vanzo	1	1990	1	Co-directed with Kent Butterworth
4	Kent Butterworth	2	1990	1	One directed with Gregg Vanzo and one with David Silverman
5	Rich Moore	17	1990–93	1–5	Includes one co-directed with Alan Smart
6	Milton Gray	2	1990, 1998	1, 9	Includes one co-directed with Wes Archer
7	Brad Bird	2	1990–91	1, 3	Includes one co-directed with Jeffrey Lynch
8	Mark Kirkland	84	1990–2020	2–31	Includes one co-directed with Matthew Nastuk
9	Jim Reardon	35	1990–2002, 2004	2–11, 13–15	
10	Jeffrey Lynch	12	1991–96	3–7	Includes one co-directed with Brad Bird
11	Carlos Baeza	9	1991–94	3–5	
12	Alan Smart	1	1991	3	Co-directed with Rich Moore
13	Bob Anderson	66	1993–2020, 2022–23	5–34	Includes one co-directed with Rob Oliver and one with Matthew Schofield
14	Susie Dietter	11	1994–98, 2007	5–9, 18	
15	Swinton O. Scott III	7	1995–99	6–7, 9–10	
16	Steven Dean Moore	87	1995–2006, 2008–25	6–37	
17	Dominic Polcino	7	1995–98	7–10	
18	Mike B. Anderson	26	1996–99, 2001–06, 2008, 2015	7–19, 21, 27	Includes two co-directed with Ralph Sosa and one with Matthew Schofield; Also directed The Simpsons Ride
19	Chuck Sheetz	19	1997, 2001–02, 2007–14	8, 12–13, 18–26	
20	Pete Michels	11	1997–99, 2002–03	8–11, 13–14	
21	Neil Affleck	7	1997–2000	8–12	
22	Mark Ervin	3	1998–99	9–10	
23	Klay Hall	1	1998	9	
24	Matthew Nastuk	68	1998–2026	10–38	Includes one co-directed with Mark Kirkland
25	Nancy Kruse	25	1999–2010	10–22	
26	Mike Frank Polcino	46	2000–03, 2005–26	11–14, 16–38	Credited as Michael Polcino until 2021
27	Lance Kramer	24	2000–03, 2005, 2007–12, 2014–18, 2021, 2023	11–14, 16, 18–23, 25–26, 28–30, 32, 34	
28	Michael Marcantel	7	2000–03, 2005–06	11–14, 16–18	
29	Jen Kamerman	3	2000–01	11–13	
30	Shaun Cashman	1	2000	12	
31	Lauren MacMullan	7	2001–04	12–16	
32	Chris Clements	38	2003, 2006, 2008–26	14, 18–37	
33	Raymond S. Persi	10	2005–10	16–21	
34	Ralph Sosa	4	2006, 2008–10	18–20, 22	Includes two co-directed with Mike B. Anderson; Also directed The Simpsons Game
35	Matthew Faughnan	31	2006–26	18, 20–38	Includes one co-directed with David Silverman
36	Rob Oliver	41	2007, 2009, 2011–25	18–21, 23–37	Includes one co-directed with Bob Anderson
37	Matthew Schofield	6	2009–14	21–25	Includes one co-directed with Mike B. Anderson and one with Bob Anderson
38	Timothy Bailey	32	2011–12, 2014–26	23–38	
39	Jennifer Moeller	7	2019–22	30–33	
40	Debbie Bruce Mahan	9	2021–26	33–37	
41	Gabriel DeFrancesco	6	2023–25	34–37	
42	Eric Koenig	3	2024–26	36–38	
43	Eddie Rosas	1	2026	38	
