= Invision Agency =

Entertainment company part-owned by The Associated Press

Invision Agency (Invision)
- Type: Private
- Industry: Celebrity entertainment photos and videos, Publicity services, Celebrity entertainment digital image licensing
- Genre: Celebrity; Award Shows; Red Carpet Fashion; Publicity; Stock Photography
- Founded: 2012
- Headquarters: Beverly Hills, California, USA
- Key people: Dan Becker, Former Managing Director; Blake Sell, Founder
- Owner: Associated Press; Matt Sayles; Jordan Strauss
- Website: www.invisionagency.com www.apimages.com

Invision Agency is a celebrity entertainment photo agency formed in 2012 by The Associated Press and several photographers in the entertainment industry. It was conceived by Blake Sell, at the time the director of photo products at The Associated Press and shortly after being presented as a viable business model to AP's management committee, was approved by AP's board of directors, moving substantially AP's entertainment photo operations to the new company.

The company is jointly owned by AP and leading entertainment industry photographers and has offices in Beverly Hills, New York and London. The company was initially headed by Managing Director Dan Becker.

In addition to providing media coverage of celebrity entertainment events for the Associated Press, including movie premiers and award shows such as the Academy Awards, Golden Globes, Emmy Awards, MTV Awards and others, Invision provided commercial photography and video services for major entertainment producers, publicists and advertising agencies backstage and on the set of television, movie and other celebrity events and product launches. Invision photos have been published in the world's largest print, broadcast and online media organizations through distribution by The Associated Press, including People Magazine, The Hollywood Reporter, Entertainment Weekly, OK! Magazine, Us Weekly, Yahoo!, ABC, BBC, FOX, NBC and others.

== History ==
The launch of the Invision Agency on May 24, 2012 was reported widely within the entertainment industry as an alternative to the dominance of Getty Images in celebrity entertainment photos, including a headline article in the entertainment trade publication Variety and in the photo industry publication Photo District News. The digital industry news site PetaPixel headline read "AP Challenging Getty’s Supremacy by Spinning Off a New Photo Agency" to underscore Invision Agency's goals.

== Expansion ==
On Jan 9, 2013 Invision and The Hollywood Reporter announced a partnership to cover celebrity entertainment events using Invision Agency photographers exclusively. "Invision's world-class photographers, combined with AP's long history of journalistic excellence, will make a perfect partner for The Hollywood Reporter as we continue to build upon our unprecedented access to entertainment industry events and provide a showcase for photography on many platforms," THR editorial director Janice Min said. The collaboration eventually ended, and in October 2015, the Hollywood Reporter announced an exclusive partnership with Invision rival, Getty Images.

Invision deepened its ranks of leading celebrity entertainment photographers when Eric Charbonneau became a part owner on Feb. 28, 2013, joining Jon Furniss, Matt Sayles, John Shearer and Jordan Strauss. John Shearer left the company in 2015 to become Nashville Bureau Chief for Getty Images.

For a period, leading music and entertainment photographer, Frank Micelotta joined Invision in April, 2013 bringing a large roster of A-list clients including relationships with key music entertainment productions and key performers such as Madonna and Beyonce.

== Coverage ==
At the 85th Academy Awards in Los Angeles Feb. 24, 2013, Invision Agency's exclusive photos from behind the scenes and backstage were published in major media outlets around the world through the 24-hour global distribution of The Associated Press.
