= List of celebrities in The Simpsons =

List of celebrities in The Simpsons may refer to:

- List of recurring The Simpsons characters – characters in the series who are celebrities
- List of The Simpsons guest stars (seasons 1–20) – real-world celebrities have guest starred in the series
- List of The Simpsons guest stars (seasons 21–present)
