= Guest appearances on The Simpsons =

Guest appearances on The Simpsons may refer to:

- List of The Simpsons guest stars (seasons 1–20)
- List of The Simpsons guest stars (seasons 21–present)
