= List of recurring The Simpsons characters =

The American animated television series The Simpsons contains a wide range of minor and supporting characters like co-workers, teachers, students, family friends, extended relatives, townspeople, local celebrities and even animals. The writers intended many of these characters as one-time jokes or for fulfilling needed functions in the town of Springfield, where the series primarily takes place. A number of these characters have gained expanded roles and have subsequently starred in their own episodes. According to the creator of The Simpsons, Matt Groening, the show adopted the concept of a large supporting cast from the Canadian sketch comedy series Second City Television.

This article features the recurring characters from the series outside of the five main characters (Homer, Marge, Bart, Lisa and Maggie Simpson). Each of them is listed in order by their first name.

== A ==
=== Agnes Skinner ===
Agnes Skinner (voiced by Tress MacNeille in most appearances, Maggie Roswell in "Lisa's Rival") is the mother of Principal Skinner and first appears in the first-season episode "The Crepes of Wrath" as an old woman who embarrassingly addresses her son as "Spanky". However, as episodes progress, her character turns bitter. She is very controlling of her son and often treats him as if he is a child, insulting and ridiculing him every chance she gets. Despite him saving her from danger, Skinner hates her because she is still controlling him. She hates Edna Krabappel due to her son's feelings for the other woman because she is jealous at her. Agnes has been married four times and has dated Comic Book Guy and Montgomery Burns. Many Springfield residents, including the Simpsons, are afraid of her. When "the real Seymour Skinner" arrives in Springfield in "The Principal and the Pauper", Agnes ends up rejecting him, in part because he stands up to her but also because, unlike Skinner/Tamzarian, her biological son is independent and does not need her anymore, while Skinner immediately reverts to a good-for-nothing without her.

Agnes's first name was revealed in the seventh-season episode "Bart the Fink". Before that, the character was known as "Mrs. Skinner". In the beginning of the series, the writers make several references to Agnes and Seymour's unhealthily close relationship as similar to that of Norman Bates and his mother. In "Boy Meets Curl", it is revealed that Agnes's resentment toward Seymour may have begun even before her son was born—during the 1952 Summer Olympics in Helsinki, Agnes competed in the pole vaulting event while nine months pregnant. When Seymour makes his first kick, he hits the bar, thus making Agnes lose and crushing her dreams (contradicting the earlier episode in which Seymour is not her birth son). In "Grade School Confidential", it is revealed that Agnes enjoys collecting pictures of cakes that she cuts out of magazines, a hobby she began in 1941. However, she does not care for the dessert itself, finding it "too sweet". In the 26th-season episode "Sky Police", she mentions that she has a brother named Stevie.

=== Akira Kurosawa ===
Akira Kurosawa (voiced by George Takei in "One Fish, Two Fish, Blowfish, Bluefish" and "What Animated Women Want", Hank Azaria voice-matching the latter in "When Flanders Failed", "In Marge We Trust" and "Guess Who's Coming to Criticize Dinner?") works as a waiter at The Happy Sumo, a Japanese restaurant in Springfield. He first appears in the second season episode "One Fish, Two Fish, Blowfish, Blue Fish".

Actor George Takei originally voiced Akira in "One Fish, Two Fish, Blowfish, Blue Fish". Since Akira's speaking role in "When Flanders Failed" where the character is depicted as a karate teacher, Hank Azaria has voiced the character, doing an impression of Takei for the voice. Takei returned to voice Akira in season 24's "What Animated Women Want". The character's name is a reference to the Japanese director Akira Kurosawa.

=== Allison Taylor ===
Allison Taylor (voiced by Winona Ryder in "Lisa's Rival", Maggie Roswell in "Lard of the Dance", Tress MacNeille in "Moe Goes from Rags to Riches", and Pamela Hayden in later episodes) is in Lisa's class but skipped a grade and has a lot in common with Lisa. She first appeared in "Lisa's Rival", in which Lisa feels threatened by Allison's talents and abilities. During a school competition, Lisa has Bart sabotage Allison's Tell-Tale Heart diorama with a cow's heart in a box and hide the original diorama beneath a floorboard. Wracked with guilt, Lisa returns Allison's real diorama. Lisa and Allison both lose to Ralph Wiggum and his Star Wars figurines. Afterwards, Lisa apologizes, and the two make amends. Allison has had a few speaking roles since and has been friends with Lisa, Janey, Sherri and Terri at school.

=== Annette ===
Annette (voiced by Rachel Bloom) is a therapist-in-training.

=== Arnie Pye ===
Arnie Pye (voiced by Dan Castellaneta) is a disgruntled, somewhat eccentric helicopter traffic reporter for Springfield's KBBL-TV (Channel 6). He dislikes pompous anchorman Kent Brockman, with whom he often gets into arguments on the air. Brockman once snarled that Pye was a "jackass", with Arnie responding that he believes Kent's soul is "as black as the ace of spades". On a few occasions when Kent has gotten fired from KBBL, Arnie has taken the job and done well while sounding very different from how he sounds the rest of the time (Arnie's traffic reporter voice is high and reedy, while his anchorman voice is deep and sonorous). Arnie seems to be resigned to never surpassing his nemesis as his reaction to Kent getting the job back in "Trust But Clarify" was a resigned "Go on, go do whatever it is you do" before sulking away from the set.

=== Artie Ziff ===
Artie Ziff (voiced by Jon Lovitz in most appearances, Dan Castellaneta in a brief appearance in "The Front") is a narcissistic Internet entrepreneur who is obsessively infatuated with Marge Simpson, his former high school classmate. Animator David Silverman based Ziff's appearance and body language on a former high school classmate.

Ziff first appears in the episode "The Way We Was" (1991), in which he takes a young Marge Bouvier to senior prom. When Artie tries to grope her in his car, Marge rejects him and drives off, encountering Homer on her way home. In adulthood, Artie tries repeatedly to coerce Marge into choosing him over Homer, with Patty's encouragement as she saw him more as the ideal husband for her sister. It is also implied that former principal Harlan Dondelinger favored Artie over Homer, believing that he would be a multimillionaire and do tasks that Homer and even Barney would never do.

In "Half-Decent Proposal" (2002), Marge learns that Artie is extremely wealthy, having made his fortune in computers by inventing an adapter that turns dial-up modem handshaking noises into easy-listening music. Marge reluctantly accepts a $1 million offer to spend a weekend at his mansion, in order to pay for an operation needed to cure Homer's extremely loud snoring. Homer assumes the two are having an affair, but Artie admits that he could not win her over. Artie begins to acknowledge that his selfishness is to blame.

In "The Ziff Who Came to Dinner" (2004), the Simpsons discover Artie hiding in their attic after he squandered his money and started an accounting scandal at his company Ziffcorp. Artie manages to scapegoat Homer by deliberately letting Homer win 98% of Ziffcorp stocks in a poker game, thus making Homer legally liable for Artie's deceit. However, he eventually confesses his guilt to the authorities after Marge berates Artie for his poor character, revealing that his own selfish behavior is the real reason no one likes him. After that, Artie is comforted by Selma and they spend the night together. As a result, Artie turns himself in. He was last seen about to be assaulted by angry prisoners after he doused their cigarettes with a squirt bottle.

In "Treehouse of Horror XXIII" (2012), Bart time-travels to 1974 and meets Marge, who is still a high school student. After he warns her not to marry Homer, Bart returns to 2012 and finds that Marge has married Artie, with Bart now named Bartie Ziff, and having inherited Artie's curly hair. Marge leaves Artie after she instantly falls in love with a host of time-traveling Homers. She says seeing them made her realize she had married the wrong man.

In "Hail to the Teeth" (2020), Artie resurfaces and invites Homer and Marge to his wedding only to find out that the bride is a robot clone of Marge. He has made other robot clones of Marge that did not work well.

In "Parahormonal Activity" (2025), Marge begins perimenopause and decides to age gracefully, rather than use hormones and wrinkle reducers with her friends. She encounters Artie while shopping for shoes and braces for his usual lechery, but both are surprised when her signs of aging leave him uninterested.

== B ==
=== Baby Gerald ===
Gerald Samson, better known as Baby Gerald, also known as "the one-eyebrowed baby", is Maggie Simpson's mean-spirited archenemy, known for his large unibrow. He makes his first appearance in "Sweet Seymour Skinner's Baadasssss Song", where Lisa refers to Baby Gerald as Maggie's rival. On a few occasions, Gerald has been shown being pushed in a stroller by his mother outside the Simpson house as in "Lady Bouvier's Lover", as the two toddlers glare at each other. He was also featured in the Simpsons theatrical short, "The Longest Daycare". The character's name was revealed in the episode "The Canine Mutiny". In "The Blue and the Gray" and "Papa Don't Leech", a possible romantic attraction between Maggie and Gerald is hinted at. In the non-canonical future of "Days of Future Future", Gerald and Maggie are married. It is implied in "Holidays of Future Passed" that he is the father of Maggie Jr. and of whom her family knows except Abe. Baby Gerald appears in the show's current title sequence (as of 2014).

=== Benjamin, Doug and Gary ===
Benjamin, Doug and Gary (voiced by Dan Castellaneta, Hank Azaria and Harry Shearer, respectively) are geeks that were once Homer Simpson's dormitory roommates at Springfield University. Benjamin carries a calculator on his belt, Doug is overweight and wears a pocket protector, and Gary wears horn-rimmed glasses and uses ear medicine. The writer of "Homer Goes to College", Conan O'Brien partially based them on three guys he went to college with, who, he said, were "incredible nerds". Director Jim Reardon used a caricature of animator Rich Moore and colored it black for Gary.

=== Bernice Hibbert ===
Bernice Hibbert (voiced by Tress MacNeille from 1999 to 2019, Maggie Roswell in "Bart After Dark", Dawnn Lewis since 2021) is Dr. Julius Hibbert's wife and is loosely based on the Clair Huxtable character from The Cosby Show. The Hibberts have three children, two boys and a girl. Nevertheless, her marriage is on the rocks; she refuses to kiss her husband, even in front of an entire audience. Her drinking has been joked about on several occasions. She fainted when she read that "Prohibition" had been introduced to Springfield and attends Springfield Alcoholics Anonymous meetings.

=== Bill and Marty ===
Bill (voiced by Dan Castellaneta, Harry Shearer in "Fraudcast News") and Marty (voiced by Harry Shearer, Dan Castellaneta in "Fraudcast News") are two radio show hosts and DJs on Springfield's own radio station KBBL. Bill is middle-aged and balding, while Marty is younger and has a full head of hair. They are responsible for giving Bart his elephant, Stampy, although they were surprised when Bart wanted Stampy, because they thought he would choose the other prize, $10,000. When Mr. Burns monopolized the local media in "Fraudcast News", he fired the duo, but they returned to the job in later episodes.

=== Birch Barlow ===
Birchibald T. "Birch" Barlow (voiced by Harry Shearer in "Sideshow Bob Roberts" and "You Kent Always Say What You Want") is a conservative talk show host on the radio station KBBL, modeled after Rush Limbaugh. As of "You Kent Always Say What You Want", he also has a show on Fox News, and serves as a parody of Fox News' conservative bias.

On his radio show, he declares himself to be "the fourth branch of government" and "the fifty-first state". He authored the book Only Turkeys Have Left Wings. Barlow plays an important part in the episode "Sideshow Bob Roberts", in which Sideshow Bob, while jailed, calls Barlow on his radio show, giving Bob an outlet to voice how the prison treats him unfairly. Barlow, knowing Bob is a fellow Republican, sympathizes with his complaints, and influences the rest of Springfield to do so as well. This leads to Bob's prompt release and ensuing mayoral election-rigging. While Barlow endorses Bob for mayor to the Springfield Republican Party, it is implied he had nothing to do with the electoral fraud, as Bob clears his name in a fit of egomaniacal boasting when Lisa accuses Bob of being Barlow's puppet.

Barlow appears in the episode "We're on the Road to D'ohwhere" as a customer at Marge's prescription drug-laden "yard sale", a reference to Limbaugh's Oxycontin addiction. Most recently Barlow appears with other Springfield Republicans in the episode "E Pluribus Wiggum", in which he tells Lisa to make Ralph Wiggum decide whether he wants to run for president as a Republican or a Democrat.

=== Bleeding Gums Murphy ===
Oscar "Bleeding Gums" Murphy (voiced by Ron Taylor in "Moaning Lisa" and "'Round Springfield", Daryl L. Coley in "Dancin' Homer", Harry Shearer in "Lisa's Pony", Kevin Michael Richardson in "The Sound of Bleeding Gums") is a jazz musician and mentor of Lisa Simpson, who idolizes the saxophonist. His real name was Oscar as mentioned by his nephew in "Lisa Gets the Blues". In his first appearance, Murphy explains the origins of his nickname: "You ever been to the dentist? Not me. I got enough pain in my life."

His most significant roles were in the episodes "Moaning Lisa" and "'Round Springfield". In "'Round Springfield", it is revealed that at one point he enjoyed a fairly successful career, releasing an album ("Sax on the Beach") and appearing on Steve Allen's The Tonight Show, as well as on an episode of The Cosby Show as one of the Cosby children's grandfathers. But he quickly lost his money feeding his addiction to purchasing Fabergé eggs.

Murphy teaches Lisa to display her emotions through music, prompting Lisa to hold him as an important figure in her life. His last appearance was in "'Round Springfield", when, after Bart ends up in the hospital, Lisa wanders off to find Murphy in a nearby ward. He explains about his life, family and work to her, as well as giving her advice for her upcoming school performance, giving her his saxophone. When Lisa returns, she finds out that Murphy has died from circumstances which are never revealed. No one, except for Lisa, attends Murphy's funeral. Lisa realizes that despite being gone physically, he still is alive in her, and honors his memory by having his album played at a local radio station. Murphy appears from the Heavens thanking Lisa for that.

It is strongly hinted in the same episode that Murphy and Dr. Julius Hibbert are long-lost brothers by Murphy's quote: "I don't really have a family. All I had was a little brother who grew up to become a doctor. He used to laugh at the most inappropriate times." Hibbert laughs inappropriately and says, "Hey, I've got an older brother that I'll never see! He's a jazz musician or some such. Oh well, bye-bye!" Each fails to recognize the other.

The episode "The Sound of Bleeding Gums" reveals that Bleeding Gums Murphy has a deaf son named Monk (voiced by John Autry II). His ghost gives advice to Lisa on how to see eye to eye with Monk. When Monk gets a cochlear implant, Lisa plays his father's song which he states that he can finally hear. Bleeding Gums Murphy's ghost thanks Lisa for helping his son to hear his song.

Bleeding Gums Murphy is loosely based on Blind Willie Johnson, at whose feet the young Bleeding Gums character learned. His saxophone playing is provided by Dan Higgins. In "The Great Wife Hope", Carl mentions he met Drederick Tatum while he was at a party with Dr. Hibbert at Murphy's house. In "Whiskey Business", Murphy appears as a hologram, causing Lisa to protest against his record label's use of his image for commercials. He appears in other episodes such as "Bart the Daredevil" (where he is yellow), "Dancin' Homer", "Old Money", "Flaming Moe's", "Bart Gets an 'F'", "Radio Bart" and "Lisa's Pony".

=== Blinky ===
Blinky the Three-Eyed Fish is a three-eyed orange fish featured primarily in "Two Cars in Every Garage and Three Eyes on Every Fish". Likely mutated by toxic waste from the Springfield Nuclear Power Plant pouring into the river, Blinky became a major news story when he was caught by Bart Simpson. Mr. Burns defends the fish, arguing that his extra eye is merely the next step in evolution. Mr. Burns goes to the Simpsons' house for a meal to boost his race for governor. Marge, a supporter of Burns' opponent Mary Bailey, deliberately serves Blinky for dinner. Mr. Burns spits the fish out and subsequently loses the election. Before then, Blinky made an earlier appearance in "Homer's Odyssey". He is later seen again in later episodes like "Raging Abe Simpson and His Grumbling Grandson in 'The Curse of the Flying Hellfish'". Episodes have portrayed Blinky as iconography for Springfield, such as appearing on maps. Blinky also made a brief appearance in an underwater section of the tube-way Fry travels through in the pilot episode of the animated series Futurama, which was created by The Simpsons creator Matt Groening. Blinky also appears in an episode of Futurama's seventh season titled "T.: The Terrestrial", on a fish bowl on Jrrr's desk.

=== Blue-Haired Lawyer ===
Mr. Burns' Lawyer, also known as The Blue-Haired Lawyer (voiced by Dan Castellaneta), is Springfield's most prominent and powerful lawyer. His name has never been revealed. He first appeared in the second season episode "Bart Gets Hit by a Car". He is known for his blue hair, authoritarian nature and nasal New York City accent. He also occasionally appears to serve as a prosecutor. Unlike Lionel Hutz or Gil Gunderson, he is competent, although not necessarily ethical. He has served as Mr. Burns' head lawyer, helping him out with threats of the Power Plant closing down and of Burns losing his money. He is a member of the Springfield Republican Party. His clients tend to be antagonists to the Simpsons, although he has also defended them on occasion. The Blue-Haired Lawyer also played a very important role in Bart's emancipation in "Barting Over".

The character's demeanor and Castellaneta's voice for the character are based on Roy Cohn, best known as Joe McCarthy's chief counsel during the Second Red Scare of the 1950s, and later legal advisor and mentor to Donald Trump. Animator Jim Reardon modeled the character's appearance on actor Charles Lane.

=== Booberella ===
Barbara Rellalinsky, more commonly known as Booberella (voiced by Tress MacNeille), is a buxom television host who dresses like a female vampire and speaks with a Romanian accent. She is a parody of Cassandra Peterson's character Elvira, Mistress of the Dark. Booberella is proud of her ample breasts and takes every chance to mention "her boobs", stretching out the "oo". Booberella's television show is a spoof of Elvira's Movie Macabre, a horror film anthology series. Booberella first appears in the episode "I'm Spelling as Fast as I Can", in which Bart and Homer watch her show. Booberella's name alludes to Vampirella (Forrest James Ackerman's comic book vampire character) and to the 1968 cult film Barbarella, which stars Jane Fonda in the title role.

=== Brandine Spuckler ===
Brandine Spuckler (voiced by Tress MacNeille) is married to Cletus Spuckler. Brandine and Cletus are depicted as stereotypical hillbillies. Throughout the series, there were outlandish theories that the two are siblings, boyfriend and girlfriend, mother and son, or father and daughter, have been suggested, with Cletus simply stating "we's all kinds of things". In one episode, she is apparently the daughter of Cletus and an alien. She has suffered from rabies, and admitted to being illiterate. This has been contradicted by the episode "Pretty Whittle Liar". More recently, Brandine is shown fighting in the Iraq War. She comes back revealing Cletus is the father of only two of the kids, casting doubt over the paternity of all the other children. Assuming that all of the children believed to be Cletus' are also hers, Brandine has 45 specifically named children. Brandine and Cletus were married by Homer during his brief stint as a minister. On April 27, 2008, more is revealed about Cletus and Brandine in an episode entitled "Apocalypse Cow"; Brandine had married Cletus at the age of 13, having been married four times previously. Brandine has had several low-level jobs, such as working for Dairy Queen, a strip club, and as an infantryman for the U.S. Army. She has also been in prison, where she developed a liking for indoor plumbing, which the Spuckler homestead lacks.

=== Brunella Pommelhorst ===
Brunella Pommelhorst (voiced by Tress MacNeille) is the gym teacher at Springfield Elementary School. Pommelhorst first appeared in "Stark Raving Dad", although Pommelhorst's name is not mentioned until "The PTA Disbands" (when a little girl left hanging on the gymnastic rings after the teachers walk out due to a strike calls for "Mrs. Pommelhorst" to let her down). Pommelhorst's name is a play on pommel horse and she has blond hair and usually wears a whistle. She takes a tough-as-nails approach to teaching. In "Little Girl in the Big Ten", Pommelhorst decides to fail Lisa because of an oath she took on Xena but allows her to make it up by taking private lessons. In "My Fair Laddy", Pommelhorst takes a leave of absence to get a sex-change operation and returns as "Mr. Pommelhorst" (implying that Pommelhorst is a transgender man), the new shop teacher. She is replaced by Coach Krupt. Despite this, the character has appeared in later episodes as a woman.

=== Bumblebee Man ===
Bumblebee Man (voiced by Hank Azaria from 1992 to 2020, Eric Lopez from 2020 to 2022, and Humberto Vélez since 2025) is the star of a Mexican Spanish-language television sitcom on Channel Ocho in which he dresses in a bumblebee costume and performs slapstick comedy. In the episode "Team Homer", his full name is shown to be "Pedro Chespirito". He works at the same studio as Kent Brockman. His first appearance was in "Itchy & Scratchy: The Movie". Bumblebee Man almost never takes off his costume, except for the episode "22 Short Films About Springfield", in which his private life is shown. In this short segment, he is portrayed as very clumsy rather than simply acting as such.

In general, Bumblebee Man only speaks in simple, over-enunciated (and often inaccurate) Spanish sentences. His catchphrases of choice are typically ¡Ay, ay, ay, no me gusta!, 'Ow, ow, ow, I don't like it!'; ¡Ay, no es bueno!, 'Ow, that's not good!'; and ¡Ay, Dios no me ama!, 'Ow, God doesn't love me!'. Quite commonly, his phrases will be intentionally sloppy Spanish. For example, in the episode "22 Short Films About Springfield", there are several words used that are not real (such as wudpequero for "woodpecker", rather than the correct pájaro carpintero). The crude Spanish is used so that English-speaking viewers would still understand it audibly rather than subtitled. However, the sole examples that feature him speaking English are briefly in "Mr. Spritz Goes to Washington" and in "Bart Gets Famous", which is the episode that has a part where he anchors the news with an English accent, filling in for Kent Brockman, who would not report the news because he did not get his Danish pastry, which Bart stole to give to Krusty.

Bumblebee Man is a caricature parody of El Chapulín Colorado, a character created and portrayed by Mexican television comedian Roberto Gómez Bolaños (a.k.a. "Chespirito"), and his show consists of simple skits, often involving heavy slapstick and set in an empty room. The staff have said that whenever they watched Univision, this character was "always on", thus they created Bumblebee Man, who is also always on the air when the Spanish-language channel is depicted. His costume was based on one used in the Saturday Night Live sketch "The Killer Bees".

In 2003, Azaria won a Primetime Emmy Award for Outstanding Voice-Over Performance for voicing Bumblebee Man, and various other characters.

== C ==
=== Capital City Goofball ===
The Capital City Goofball (voiced by Tom Poston) is the mascot for Capital City. His appearance seems to have been inspired by the mascot of the Philadelphia Phillies baseball team, the Phillie Phanatic. The costume is a creature with a baseball body, with a blue Capital City T-shirt, yellow arms and legs, a long flat-ended nose, tufts of fur at the side, a red hat with two springs, two costume eyes that look in either direction, and two more eyes that peek outside the mouth. The Capital City Goofball first appeared in the episode "Dancin' Homer" and shared the stage with Homer. He also appears in "Radio Bart" as one of many celebrities recording a charity single. After that, he is absent until "Homer to the Max", where he walks past the Simpsons window alongside Mr. Largo when Lisa talks about TV shows rewriting or dropping characters that appear early on. In "Bart vs. Lisa vs. the Third Grade", the Capital City Goofball represents Capital City in the state legislature; he spent $80 million out of his own pocket to win the seat, and now is leading an effort to change the state's embarrassing flag, a Confederate battle flag set between the ocean and the rays of the sun (especially as the state was in the North).

Following Tom Poston's death in 2007, the character was reduced to making minor background appearances and usual honking sounds, and has not spoken since "Bart and Lisa vs. the Third Grade".

=== Captain Lance Murdock ===
Captain Lance Murdock (voiced by Dan Castellaneta) is a professional stunt devil who appeared more in the early days of the show rather than the newer episodes. He first appeared in "Bart the Daredevil" which featured him in more scenes than other episodes. He later appeared in "I Married Marge", "Selma's Choice" and "Viva Ned Flanders". He was most recently featured when Krusty was flicking channels on his TV in "Today I Am a Clown". He also appears in Lisa's lecture about Lake Springfield in The Simpsons Movie sitting in the audience. His stunts often end in disaster, such as in "Viva Ned Flanders" and "Bart the Daredevil", where he states that he has broken every bone in his body after a failed stunt (he did have one unbroken bone, his thumb, but broke it when trying to give Bart a thumbs-up). His signature bike is the Suicycle and he has his own action figure complete with an ambulance.

=== Carl Carlson ===
Carlton Carlson (voiced by Harry Shearer in "Homer's Night Out" and "Brush with Greatness"; Hank Azaria from season 2 to 31; Alex Désert since season 32) is Homer's friend and co-worker (sometimes identified as his supervisor) at the Nuclear Power Plant and is often seen with Lenny. He likes to call himself "an urban Lenny". He attended Springfield A&M University.

Carl is an Icelandic-African American, with a master's degree in nuclear physics, fond of bowling and drinking at Moe's Tavern. Carl is frequently said to be among the most attractive men in Springfield; in "Principal Charming", Homer concludes that Carl is too attractive for Selma. According to "They Saved Lisa's Brain", he might be diabetic, while according to "The Dad Who Knew Too Little" he might be severely schizophrenic. In "'Scuse Me While I Miss the Sky", it was revealed that Carl spent at least part of his boyhood in Iceland.

The episode "The Saga of Carl" provides his origin story, describing how he was raised in Iceland. The episode includes his reunion with his Icelandic parents, who adopted him at an unspecified age from an unspecified nation. The episode's plot revolves around the Carlson family curse, which had tarnished their reputation in Iceland for centuries.

In the early seasons, Carl was rarely seen with Lenny and did not have a consistent voice—on some occasions, he can be heard with Lenny's voice and vice versa. One example of Carl having Lenny's voice is in "Brush with Greatness". In an early 1991 episode, "Principal Charming", Carl's name is spelled "Karl", the same spelling seen for an unrelated character of the same season.

Lenny and Carl are best friends, as they are rarely seen apart; their other friends are Homer, and regulars at Moe's including Barney Gumble and Moe Szyslak. Homer repeatedly confuses Lenny and Carl, and is shocked to learn on one occasion that Lenny is white, and Carl is black. To guide himself, Homer has "Lenny = White, Carl = Black" on his hand. He once muttered to himself, "Is that right?" while reading it. In "Helter Shelter", Homer exclaims, "That's Lenny? I wanted the black one!" When Mr. Burns appears on a radio show in an attempt to boost his popularity in "Monty Can't Buy Me Love", Homer tells him that he has a list of jokes explaining the differences between white and black people; Homer later states, "White guys have names like Lenny, whereas black guys have names like Carl."

Lenny and Carl work at the Springfield Nuclear Power Plant alongside Homer Simpson. Lenny and Carl together rank sixth on IGN's Top 25 Simpsons Peripheral Characters.

=== Cecil Terwilliger ===
Cecil Onderdonk Terwilliger (voiced by David Hyde Pierce) is the younger brother of Robert Onderdonk Terwilliger, a.k.a. Sideshow Bob. His first appearance was in the episode "Brother from Another Series", where it was revealed that Bob only got the job as Krusty's sideshow ten years ago because Cecil, who had always wanted to be a children's entertainer, failed his audition due to lack of dignity and dull personality. He later became Springfield's "Chief Hydrological and Hydrodynamical Engineer" although he planned to blow up the new hydroelectric dam he was building, so that nobody would know how cheaply it was made. Cecil kept most of the building money for himself, making it look as if it was his brother. However, Sideshow Bob, Lisa and Bart worked together to successfully foil him. Eventually, after losing the money, Cecil attempted to kill Bart which Bob never could, but ironically, this was foiled by Bob himself. His second appearance was in the episode "Funeral for a Fiend", where, following Robert's death, he convinced Bart to go to his cremation. It turned out, though, that Sideshow Bob faked the whole thing in another elaborate plot to kill Bart.

He is voiced by David Hyde Pierce, who also plays the younger brother of Sideshow Bob's voice actor Kelsey Grammer's character in Frasier. Cecil's mannerisms and his relationship with his brother are also loosely based on Niles and Frasier's relationship in Frasier. Cecil makes a third appearance in the episode "O Brother, Where Bart Thou?", where he and Bob are happily flying kites across a park in Bart's dream of wanting a younger brother.

=== Cesar and Ugolin ===
Cesar (voiced by Harry Shearer in most appearances, Hank Azaria in "To Courier with Love") and Ugolin (voiced by Dan Castellaneta) are an uncle-and-nephew pair of stereotypical Frenchmen who, in "The Crepes of Wrath", make Bart a slave at their "Chateau Maison" winery and put antifreeze in their wine to increase the profit.

In "Lisa the Greek", they are briefly shown watching TV in their apartment in Paris.

In "Last Exit to Springfield", they are briefly shown looting a store during the blackout.

In "To Courier with Love", they are leathermakers who try to kill an endangered blue snake that Homer was supposed to send them to pay for a trip to France. They try to capture it on their own and fail.

They take their names from Cesar and Ugolin, shifty and greedy uncle-and-nephew characters from the films Jean de Florette and Manon des Sources.

=== Charlie ===
Charlie (voiced by Dan Castellaneta, Hank Azaria in "Opposites A-Frack") worked at the Springfield Nuclear Power Plant as the 'Dangerous Emissions Supervisor'. Due to reporting gross safety violations (including a painted-on emergency exit door), he was briefly replaced by Mindy Simmons, but she got fired afterwards due to alcoholism and disruptive behavior. His first appearance was in "Life on the Fast Lane". He was briefly out of work due to an unnamed on-the-job injury, where he collected workers' compensation; however, future episodes show him back to work. He had a wife and two kids, as well as a sister with a wooden leg (which Charlie used as a lucky bat). In "The Trouble with Trillions", Charlie tells Homer (who is working undercover) that he has plans to overrun the American government due to their stalling on making HDTV available; he is soon arrested by FBI agents for conspiracy.

Charlie is currently deceased in the present day story following his demise in the Season 35 episode "Cremains of the Day" in which he sacrifices himself to save the urn containing Larry's ashes.

Dan Castellaneta said that he did "an imitation of Lenny" for the voice.

=== Chase/Pyro ===
Chase, also known as Pyro, (voiced by Hank Azaria) is an American Gladiator. He is a parody of the real-life Gladiator Nitro and first appears in the episode "A Milhouse Divided", dating Luann after her divorce. Their relationship ends when she is caught cheating with his own best friend, Gladiator Gyro.

He also appears in "Wild Barts Can't Be Broken", "Mom and Pop Art", "Alone Again, Natura-Diddily", "It's a Mad, Mad, Mad, Mad Marge", "Day of the Jackanapes", "A Star Is Born Again" and "The Bart of War".

=== Cletus Spuckler ===
Cletus Del Roy Montfort Bigglesworth Spuckler (voiced by Hank Azaria), commonly called Cletus the Slack-Jawed Yokel, is Springfield's resident hillbilly stereotype, and speaks with a Southern United States accent. He is usually portrayed wearing a white sleeveless shirt and blue jeans.

He was named 7th in IGN's Top 25 Simpsons Peripheral Characters.

Cletus was introduced during the fifth season of the show, in "Bart Gets an Elephant", as one of the "slack-jawed yokels" gawking at Bart's elephant Stampy. Cletus' voice is slightly deeper in this initial appearance than in later episodes. He, like the Sea Captain before him, was the go-to character for a quick laugh on the show, and is a staff favorite. He made several generic appearances on the show before being given his first name in "Home Sweet Homediddly-Dum-Doodily".

Cletus' low intelligence is usually portrayed as the result of inbreeding and jokes are occasionally made which refer to his partner Brandine being related to him. It has been suggested that Brandine is Cletus' mother and sister. The two are shown to have a large number of children with stereotypical "hillbilly" names, and add to their family casually. In the episode "Apocalypse Cow", one of his many daughters, Mary, received a cow from Bart, which Bart wanted Mary to care for. Cletus mistook this for a proposal, and almost married the two. He is said to have 70 kids, at least 45 of whom have been named in episodes.

The first name Cletus came from writer Jeff Martin's boyhood little league baseball coach in Houston, Texas.

His last name was given as "Del Roy" in the episode "Behind the Laughter". In "Marge vs. Singles, Seniors, Childless Couples and Teens, and Gays", his name is given as "Cletus Spuckler" in a news report. In the episodes "Sweets and Sour Marge" and "Yokel Hero", he signs his name as Cletus Spuckler.

=== Coach Krupt ===
Coach Krupt (voiced by Hank Azaria) is the gym teacher at Springfield Elementary School following Miss Pummelhorst's departure to have a sex-change operation. He is obsessed with the game Bombardment and plays it relentlessly, spilling over into his personal life when, whilst dining at the Gilded Truffle, he pelts Groundskeeper Wille (who working there as a waiter) with bread rolls and yells "bombardment" when ordering. He can be seen in season 20's "How the Test Was Won" training the students for their standardized tests and hurling rubber balls at those who give wrong answers and has since made minor cameos in later episodes. He has a wife, daughter and son.

=== Cookie Kwan ===
Cookie Kwan (voiced by Tress MacNeille) is an Asian American real estate broker who first appears in the episode "Realty Bites". She is the stereotypical competitive woman with a thick Asian accent that she has been trying to lose since she was a child. She touts herself as being "number one on the West Side", although she also works on the East Side. She is very aggressive toward anyone she deems a threat to her business, evidenced by when she threatens Gil Gunderson. She once attempted to seduce Ned Flanders, has had an illegitimate child with Mayor Quimby, and has flirted with Homer. She is friends with Lindsey Naegle. She is a Republican. She is played by MacNeille with a strong and harsh stereotypical Chinese accent.

=== Crazy Cat Lady ===
Eleanor Abernathy (voiced by Tress MacNeille), better known as the Crazy Cat Lady, is a woman with the appearance and behavior of a stereotypical mentally ill cat hoarder. She first appears in "Girly Edition". Abernathy is always surrounded by a large number of cats, and in every appearance, she screams gibberish and/or throws cats at passersby. She gives Lisa one of her cats, Snowball V, who looks exactly like her original Snowball II. Despite appearing older by her white hair and careless appearance, she is the same age as Marge, Homer and Moe.

Abernathy was once a bright, vibrant young woman. When she was eight, Abernathy wanted to be both a doctor and a lawyer as she believed a woman can be whatever she wants to be if she just sets her mind to it. At 16, she began studying for law school, and by 24 she earned a law degree from Yale Law School and a medical degree from Harvard Medical School. When she turned 32, Abernathy suffered from psychological exhaustion, became an alcoholic, and sought solace in her pet cat. The once-promising young doctor/lawyer became a raving, cat-hoarding lunatic. Abernathy briefly reverts to her sanity and high intelligence thanks to some pills, but after Marge points out that the pills are actually Reese's Pieces candy, Abernathy abruptly resumes her deranged behavior. When participating in a mayoral election, she lucidly discusses topics such as health care, economy and public education in between her screams and gibberish.

In the episode "Eeny Teeny Maya Moe", Abernathy reveals that she once owned a cat with Moe Szyslak after he says that there "Is a much creepier guy right next to me." from a public library computer. She yells "You know I'm a woman!" and also that their cat had kittens; she then proclaims that "These are yours!" and throws three cats at him. She is also seen in "The Blue and the Gray" flirting (and swapping animals) with another mentally ill person carrying dogs. In the episode "A Midsummer's Nice Dream", Abernathy is shown to be a hoarder. After Marge helps her clean up her house, she begins speaking normally and wearing proper clothing. Later, in an attempt to fix Marge's new hoarding problem, Abernathy reverts to her crazy self, reclaiming all of the hoarded junk and calling her cats back to her.

In the episode "Monty Burns' Fleeing Circus", Abernathy shows she has an opera-quality singing voice.

== D ==
=== Database ===
Kyle "Database" (alternatively voiced by Nancy Cartwright, Tress MacNeille and Pamela Hayden) is a nerdy student who attends Springfield Elementary School. He first appeared in the episode "Bart's Comet" as a member of "the Super Friends". He has since had speaking parts in several episodes. He is usually seen with his fellow nerd Martin Prince. Database is a common target for Nelson, Dolph, Jimbo and Kearney. Database is part of the group of boys who invade Shelbyville in "Lemon of Troy". He is one of the Pre-Teen Braves in the episode "The Bart of War". He is a member of the school band, as seen in "The PTA Disbands". Database is known for his annoying, nerdy voice which is supplied by Nancy Cartwright. Database's father is shown in "Lemon of Troy", although he utters no dialogue and is only in the background. Matt Groening has stated that Database is his least favorite character in the show.

=== Dave Shutton ===
Dave Shutton (voiced by Harry Shearer) is a reporter for The Springfield Shopper. Writer John Swartzwelder named Shutton after a friend of his. His first appearance was in "Two Cars in Every Garage and Three Eyes on Every Fish".

Since then, his roles have become less relevant and have been reduced to short appearances. According to "Who Shot Mr. Burns? (Part Two)", Kent Brockman does not like Dave Shutton and thinks he is unprofessional.

=== Declan Desmond ===
Declan Desmond (voiced by Eric Idle) is an odd and skeptical English documentary filmmaker who has directed several films, including Do You Want Lies with That?, American Boneheads: A Day In The Life Of Springfield Elementary, Growing Up Springfield, Ain't No Mountain: A Blind Man Climbs Everest, and The Spy Who Learned Me. Growing Up Springfield is his most notable documentary. It follows the lives of the inhabitants of Springfield, starting when they were in third grade and continuing every eight years. Desmond appeared in the episodes "'Scuse Me While I Miss the Sky" and "Fat Man and Little Boy" and his Growing Up Springfield series were featured in the episode "Springfield Up". A documentary directed by him appeared in "The Spy Who Learned Me".

The character appears to be loosely based on British director Michael Apted, who is known for his Up Series of documentaries following groups of individuals as they age.

=== Devil ===
The Devil (voiced by Harry Shearer in "Bart Gets Hit By a Car", "Homer vs. Lisa and the 8th Commandment", "Friends and Family" and "Deep Deep Trouble", Richard Dawkins in "Black-Eyed Please", Idris Elba in "Treehouse of Horror XXXVI") is The Simpsons depiction of the ruler of Hell and has made many appearances in this show. He has gone by the alias of Satan in "Selma's Choice", "Boy-Scoutz 'n the Hood", "Faith Off", "Behind the Laughter", "Pray Anything" and "We're on the Road to D'oh-where" and Lucifer in "Cape Feare" and "Lisa the Vegetarian". The Devil has also appeared using the devil-like forms of some of the other characters.

=== Dewey Largo ===
Deward "Dewey" Largo (voiced by Harry Shearer) is the music teacher, whom Lisa credited with proving that any piece of music could have the soul sucked out of it. Like most of the staff of Springfield Elementary, Largo has long since lost all passion for his job as conductor, and cares little for creativity or music anymore. He is always seen in the opening sequence, teaching his class and throwing Lisa out of his band class when she plays a tune on her saxophone. His last name, Largo, is also an Italian word for a slow, broad, musical tempo, likely a reference to the fact that he can make any piece of music uninteresting. He is a lover of the music of John Philip Sousa, and is incredulous when Lisa suggests the school band plays something different. However, he does seem to have some appreciation for Lisa's musical talent, as shown when he advises his replacement to "just teach the one with the starfish head, and you'll be okay".

He has not played a large role in the series, but was originally intended to be an uptight foil for Lisa and her non-conformist ways. After the first few seasons, Mr. Largo was rarely seen. However, he has since resurfaced as a recurring character in the seventeenth season, making appearances in several episodes after. In the episode "Homer's Paternity Coot", it is revealed that Largo was accepted to the Juilliard School, but never got the letter as it was frozen atop Mount Springfield. He ended up at Springfield Elementary instead. In season 22's "Elementary School Musical", after attending a performing arts camp, Lisa is warned by Mr Largo that he also attended one as a child, and that they just "fill your head with sugarcandy dreams that can't come true." A recurring gag since the 17th-season episode "See Homer Run", are allusions that Largo is gay. The 22nd-season episode "Flaming Moe" confirmed that Largo is gay and in a relationship with an older man, also named Dewey. In "Eeny Teeny Maya Moe", Dr. Nick mistakenly makes Mr Largo shorter, instead of Moe. It is implied Dr. Nick was about to give Moe the sex-change operation that was originally meant for Largo, as he is heard to cry: "I look nothing like Julie Newmar!". The 30th-season episode "Girl's in the Band" depicts him with a partner named Geoffrey, who appears alongside him in subsequent episodes. "My Fair Laddy" reveals that he is considered the second least important employee of the school after Willie, as he is demoted to groundskeeper after Willie leaves.

=== Disco Stu ===
Stuart "Disco Stu" Discothèque (voiced by Hank Azaria), is a man who is mentally stuck in the disco era. He is normally featured wearing a rhinestone-encrusted leisure suit. Stu was introduced as the punchline to a joke in "Two Bad Neighbors". In a rummage sale, Homer attempts to sell a jacket on which he had once tried to write "Disco Stud" in rhinestones, but having made the letters too big he did not have room for the final "d". After Marge remarks that nobody would ever want to buy a jacket that read "Disco Stu", another customer recommends it to Stu, but Stu replies, "Disco Stu doesn't advertise."

Stu's speech pattern is similar to that of Duffman, also voiced by Hank Azaria; he speaks in the third person, often referring to himself as "Disco Stu" (emphasizing "Stu" and then pausing before saying anything else; whatever follows usually rhymes with "Stu"). According to "How I Spent My Strummer Vacation", Stu actually is aware disco is dead, does not like disco music at all, and worries that his personality may make him a "one-note guy". His brief marriage to Selma Bouvier was annulled by Pope John Paul II. In "How I Wet Your Mother", Professor Frink creates a device that allows people to enter the dreams of others. He stated he had already used the device "To cure another Springfielder of his particular obsession" at which point Stu walks into the frame in khakis and a collared shirt before saying, "Normal Stu likes normal things." In "Homer Scissorhands", Stu is seen attending a ball alone, saying his girlfriend is not feeling well. She is then seen arriving arm-in-arm with Krusty the Clown. In the episode "Springfield Up", it is revealed that in his younger years, he had a budding career as a sea captain, going by the name of "Nautical Stu", and only finds the joy of disco music when Marge puts some on while taking his picture for his captain's license.

Show runner Bill Oakley described the original Disco Stu as "an old, wrinkly John Travolta". Stu was originally to be voiced by repeat guest star Phil Hartman. However, when the animators remodeled the character, Hartman was not available to dub the voice and so Hank Azaria took over the role. Out of 25, IGN named Stu the 24th top peripheral character in The Simpsons.

=== Dolph Shapiro ===
Dolph Shapiro (voiced by Tress MacNeille in most appearances, Pamela Hayden in "The Telltale Head" and "New Kid on the Block") is a bully and student at Springfield Elementary School who is one of Jimbo Jones' friends. Dolph is recognized by his asymmetrical haircut which covers one eye; he wears cutoff shorts and basketball shoes. He made his first appearance in the episode "The Telltale Head". In a later episode, it is revealed that he is Jewish and goes to Hebrew School after elementary school, wherein he is preparing for his bar mitzvah, an event held for Jewish boys upon turning 13, although it had been previously established he is 14 years old.

=== Drederick Tatum ===
Drederick Tatum (voiced by Hank Azaria from season 2 to 31, Jay Pharoah since season 33) has appeared in several episodes. He is a professional boxer and the reigning world heavyweight boxing champion. He features prominently in the episode "The Homer They Fall", in which Homer takes up boxing and is lined up as an opponent for Tatum, soon to be released from prison. The fight proves one-sided, and Homer is rescued by Moe just as he is about to be knocked unconscious by Tatum. Tatum grew up in Springfield, but in "Flaming Moe's" he calls the city "a dump" and says "if you ever see me back there, you know I really [bleeped expletive] up bad."

The 1984 Olympic gold medalist, he first became world champion after defeating Watson in the heavily promoted "Bout to Knock the Other Guy Out", a fight Homer and his friends watched on his illegal cable hookup. He was so feared inside prison, he could stop riots just by telling the rioters to "shut up". Tatum also appears in "Bye Bye Nerdie", in which Lisa swabs him with nerd sweat, which forces Nelson Muntz to involuntarily get up and start punching Tatum and give him a wedgie, to little effect. A sobbing Nelson tries to apologize, begging him not to punch him, but Tatum rolls up his sleeves and declares "you leave me little recourse".

Tatum is a parody of Mike Tyson, with a high-pitched, lisping voice, a menacing demeanor, a criminal record, financial problems, and a tendency to speak in a surprisingly formal manner ("I insist that you desist", "your behavior is unconscionable"). In the episode "Highway to Well", he sports a facial tattoo resembling Tyson's. He also has an unscrupulous manager named Lucius Sweet who closely resembles Tyson's promoter and manager Don King. Indeed, in "The Homer They Fall", Homer notes that Sweet "is as rich and famous as Don King, and looks just like him". King and Tyson were asked to appear in the episode, but declined. Paul Winfield, who played King in a 1995 Tyson biopic, took the role instead. Another episode shows him in the role of a shoe company endorser who is extremely candid, describing the shoes as "butt-ugly" before ruefully stating "My forthrightness is my undoing".

== E ==
=== Eddie ===
Eddie (voiced by Harry Shearer) is one of the Springfield police officers. He first appeared in the first season episode "There's No Disgrace Like Home". Like Lou, he does not have a surname.

In "Bart vs. Thanksgiving", Eddie was animated to Lou's voice and Lou was animated to Eddie's.

=== Elizabeth Hoover ===
Elizabeth Hoover (voiced by Maggie Roswell, understudied by Marcia Mitzman Gaven) is a second-grade teacher at Springfield Elementary. In early episodes, Miss Hoover seemed proud to have a student as bright as Lisa in her class. However, in later seasons it seems she has been worn down by her years in the public school system and, in "Lisa Gets an 'A'", implies that she frequently drinks during lunch.

In the episode "Lisa's Substitute", she thought she had lyme disease. She is very apathetic and bored with her job. She is often seen smoking even while teaching, once even under a "No Smoking" sign in the assembly hall. Her desperate attempts to regain her stability include rushing out of class to recite "Calm blue ocean, calm blue ocean" with her eyes closed, getting into her car and driving off on two occasions, and even letting Ralph teach the class after she was granted tenure and therefore free to do almost anything she wants.

Marcia Mitzman Gaven substituted as Elizabeth Hoover when Maggie Roswell was involved in a pay dispute.

== F ==
=== Fallout Boy ===
In the series, Fallout Boy (alternatively voiced by Dan Castellaneta and Harry Shearer) first appears in a 1950s Radioactive Man serial film shown at a comic book convention in the episode "Three Men and a Comic Book". However, unlike many Simpsons characters, he has only made a handful of appearances since. While Radioactive Man is a broad parody of many superheroes, most obviously containing elements of Batman and Superman (and the comic incorporates an origin story similar to Marvel's Hulk), among others, Fallout Boy is mainly a parody of Robin (with his costume, references as being the 'young ward' of Radioactive Man, and his younger age and sidekick status) with elements of Spider-Man (his fictional comic book origin, for example). His catchphrase is "Jiminy Jillickers!"

Fallout Boy also appears in a real-life comic book titled Radioactive Man, published by Bongo Comics (a comic created in part by Matt Groening, the creator of The Simpsons). In these comic books, Fallout Boy's real name is Rod Runtledge, he has a brother named Dodd. They live in Zenith City. Rod is a high school nerd living with his aunt, Aunt June. Fallout Boy was an average book worm, until one day, he was at a Radioactive demonstration, where he met up with Claude Kane. A tall piece of machinery fell towards them. Claude grabbed Rod and jumped over the rail, Claude holding onto the machine. The machine came to life, and as the ray passed through Claude, who became Radioactive Man, it hit Rod. Rod then got a pint-sized version of Radioactive Man's powers and became Fallout Boy.

In the episode "Radioactive Man", Milhouse was chosen over Bart to play Fallout Boy in the Radioactive Man movie to be filmed in Springfield.

The rock band Fall Out Boy took their name from this character.

=== Frank Grimes ===
Franklin A. "Frank" Grimes Sr. (voiced by Hank Azaria), occasionally referred to as "Grimey" much to his displeasure, was a 35-year-old everyman and consummate professional who had struggled through a lifetime of hardship. Grimes makes his only canonical appearance in the series in "Homer's Enemy" in which he is a new employee at the power plant. Throughout the episode, Grimes's professionalism is repeatedly contrasted with Homer Simpson's idiocy, gluttony and laziness, making Grimes increasingly frustrated and angry with Homer. True to the name of the episode, Grimes eventually declares Homer his enemy after his co-worker gets him into serious trouble with his new boss Mr. Burns. After several failed attempts to expose Homer's stupidity and irresponsibility, Grimes makes one final attempt by tricking Homer into entering a nuclear power plant design contest intended for kids. After Homer is declared the winner, Grimes snaps, declaring that he can also be as lazy and moronic as Homer, and should be able to get away with it just as Homer does. As he runs amok through the plant, Grimes, declaring that he does not need safety gloves, grabs two high-voltage wires and is fatally electrocuted. As a final inadvertent insult, Homer sleeps through the funeral. His insensitivity amuses the assembled mourners, who laugh as Grimes's coffin is lowered. Grimes has been referenced in several later episodes, first in "Natural Born Kissers", where Homer finds an old pamphlet to Grimes's funeral.

In "Treehouse of Horror XII", Grimes is one of the faces on the Wailing Wall. His tombstone appears in "Alone Again, Natura-Diddily" and was also kicked by Homer in "My Mother the Carjacker".

His son Frank Grimes Jr. sought to avenge his father's death by killing Homer in "The Great Louse Detective".

In the non-canon season 28 episode "Treehouse of Horror XXVII", the ghost of Frank Grimes appears as part of Sideshow Bob's army of the Simpsons' enemies.

His tombstone can also be seen in the new opening sequence for the show (during the flash through the town from Marge and Maggie in the car to the front of the Simpsons' house, Ralph Wiggum can be seen playing in the dirt in front of the tombstone).

=== Frankie the Squealer ===
Frankie the Squealer (voiced by Dan Castellaneta) is a mafia member and soldier for Fat Tony. However, he does not appear to be very useful to his colleagues in criminal activity due to his uncontrollable habit of squealing. On several occasions, the mob has attempted to kill him for his squealing, though they have repeatedly been unsuccessful. Frankie first appeared in the episode "Insane Clown Poppy" where his squealing habits are introduced after he squeals on himself for squealing.

== G ==
=== Gareth Prince ===
Gareth Prince (voiced by Harry Shearer in "Bart the Genius" and "Bart on the Road", Dan Castellaneta from season 2 to 32, Hank Azaria since season 33, Chris Edgerly in "Todd, Todd, Why Has Thou Forsaken Me"?) is the father of Martin Prince, and husband of Gloria Prince. He is a stockbroker in Springfield and was shown bringing his son to work on "Go To Work With Your Parents Day", where Martin made over $1 million trading soy futures (and subsequently lost all but $600). He appears to be a nerd much like his son, and has a slight lisp. Gareth was also one of the fathers who traveled in Ned Flanders's RV to locate their sons in Shelbyville.

Note: The script for "Kamp Krusty" revealed that Gareth was originally supposed to be called Martin Prince Sr.

=== Gil Gunderson ===
Gil Gunderson, a.k.a. Ol' Gil (voiced by Dan Castellaneta), first appeared in the ninth season episode "Realty Bites" as a real estate agent with Lionel Hutz's Red Blazer Realty. He is a spoof of actor Jack Lemmon's portrayal of Shelley Levene in the 1992 film adaptation of the play Glengarry Glen Ross. (Lemmon himself voiced a character similar to Levene in the eighth-season episode "The Twisted World of Marge Simpson".) Show runner Mike Scully said that the writers thought that Gil would be "a one-shot thing". "Castellaneta was so funny at the table read doing the character [that] we kept making up excuses in subsequent episodes to put him in", Scully said. Writer Dan Greaney said it was a great take-off on Levene to make Gil more desperate than he was. Even so, the writers like to write Gil with "a little bit of the old sparkle" left in him.

Since the retirement of the character Lionel Hutz (after voice actor Phil Hartman's death), Gil has been working as the Simpsons' lawyer in later episodes, though he has appeared in that role much less frequently than Lionel did (most scenes where one of the Simpsons is in court have either made their attorney an anonymous figure or simply ignored him or her). Gil's work history includes many unsuccessful sales jobs, a position where he committed theft and was busted by the IRS for it, another job where he lost the entire company payroll at a Las Vegas casino, and a 2009 stint when he was hired by the Springfield Police Department after he was able to free Chief Wiggum after he handcuffed himself to his desk. He always gets fired, often for just being incompetent but sometimes out of bad luck (he lost his job as Santa at Costington's when he refused to take back a Malibu Stacey doll, he gave to Lisa so that the CEO's granddaughter could have it, and Marge fires him from her Mother Hubbard's Sandwich Shop for no real reason). His way of selling is disastrous, as he is usually very unconfident, naturally bumbling, and tends to come off as needy, especially as he almost always refers to himself in the third person, as "Ol' Gil". The only time he has been fired for something illegal or on purpose was revealed in the episode "Do Pizza Bots Dream of Electric Guitars", being arrested (and fired) for drug trafficking cocaine. In "Natural Born Kissers" it was mentioned that Gil lives in a balloon, and he is seen in "Rise of the Guardians" noting that he resides in the city's sewer system. In 2006, "Kill Gil, Volumes I & II", the only episode to center on Gil, won a Writers Guild of America Award in the animation category. It is also revealed in The Simpsons episodes that he is a grandfather now, and is seen with his granddaughter at daycare. In the Season 34 premiere "Habeas Tortoise", Gil and Miss Hoover fall in love and get married.

=== Gloria Prince ===
Gloria Prince (voiced by Russi Taylor in "Worst Episode Ever", Tress MacNeille in "Orange Is the New Yellow" and Pamela Hayden since season 33) is married to Gareth Prince and mother of Martin Prince. Gloria attempted to sell Martin's valuable Star Wars merchandise to Comic Book Guy for almost nothing, despite a warning not to do so by Bart and Milhouse. According to Martin she shoplifts "stuff she doesn't even need". She was responsible for all of the guests, even her own son getting sick at his birthday party, by serving diseased oysters instead of cake, with the exception of Bart (who fed his oysters to Martin's pet cat), Lisa (who feigned sick to get out of the boring party) and Principal Skinner and Mrs. Krabappel (who were having a romantic encounter in Martin's kid-sized pink playhouse).

=== God ===
God (voiced by Harry Shearer in most appearances, Phil Hartman in "Bart Gets Hit By a Car") has had many appearances in the series, including "My Way or the Highway to Heaven", "Homer the Heretic", "Thank God, It's Doomsday" and "Pray Anything". He also appears in the opening sequence. He is portrayed in the traditional depiction of the Abrahamic god: a gray-haired man in a white robe with a booming voice. In most episodes, only his beard is seen while his face is often obscured. One of God's distinctive features is that he and Jesus are the only two The Simpsons characters drawn with five fingers on each hand and five toes on each foot. According to showrunner Al Jean, "The Simpsons is one of the few shows on TV where God is not only very real, but he's a kind of vengeful Old Testament God."

=== Grady ===
Grady Little (voiced by Scott Thompson) is Julio's lover. In "Three Gays of the Condo", Marge finds a note that says she wanted to dump Homer before they get married. This upsets Homer and he finds a new place to live. Julio and Grady needed a third person in the apartment. He agrees to stay with them. Later, Homer loves Marge again; he moves out. Before Homer moved out, it is revealed Grady loves Homer. Homer runs away saying "I will only hurt you!"

Grady and Julio make small appearances in several other episodes.

== H ==
=== Hank Scorpio ===
Hank Scorpio (voiced by Albert Brooks) is a one-time character. He is a supervillain who used to be Homer's boss when they moved to Cypress Creek in the second episode of season 8, "You Only Move Twice". He is the owner of Globex Corporation and his office is in a volcano. When Marge, Bart, Lisa and Maggie wanted to go back to Springfield, Homer had to quit while Hank was fighting off the government. Since Homer was a big help, Hank gave him the Denver Broncos in return.

=== Hans Moleman ===
Hans Moleman (voiced by Dan Castellaneta) is the retconned name of an earlier character named "Ralph Melish". A character similar in appearance is seen briefly in the episode "Homer's Odyssey". He was renamed when a writer noticed he looked like a mole man.

A short and seemingly elderly man, Moleman is sometimes portrayed as a resident of the Springfield Retirement Castle, although in a deleted scene from the episode "Brother from Another Series" he is shown to live in a house under a dam. He has cataracts and is almost entirely blind, which has severely impaired his reading ability and has led to repeated revokings of his driver's license. He carries a cane to walk with. Although he appears to be elderly, in fact, Hans Moleman claims to be 31 years old, and that "drinking has ruined [his] life". He is also the host of a radio program, "Moleman in the Morning", on Springfield radio station KJAZZ.

In episode 13 of season 26, "Walking Big & Tall", Hans is revealed to be the former mayor of Springfield, who was briefly banished from Springfield, riding a horse, by the angry townsfolk when Moe Szyslak discovered that a song Moleman had made Springfield's city anthem 30 years before was in fact a rip-off of another town's anthem and used by other towns.

In 2015, Hans appears as a non-playable character in the toys-to-life video game Lego Dimensions. In game, he only appears in the Simpsons levels and all his voice lines are archive audio from Dan Castellaneta.

His character is based on a character created by Tex Avery, Droopy.

Like many recurring characters, Hans Moleman has extremely bad career outcomes during the series. Hans Moleman's appearances usually come in the form of a running gag where he is killed by various accidents, yet inexplicably returns unharmed in subsequent episodes. He has been driven off a cliff while hauling Edgar Allan Poe's house, torched by a solar ray, drilled in the head by Mr. Burns, executed via the electric chair, thrown out of a window, eaten by alligators, sucked up by roombas, buried alive, smothered by a Rover, killed by the Grim Reaper's touch of death, drowned after driving his truck off a broken bridge, has had his car explode after bumping into a tree, and has been crushed by various different objects on several occasions. In The Simpsons Movie, Homer's car runs him over. He has also suffered many non-fatal accidents such as getting hit in the groin by a football during his indie film and crashing his car into the Planet Hype restaurant. In The Simpsons: Road Rage opening cutscene, he gets horrifically irradiated by the Burns Atomic Mega-bus.

=== The Happy Little Elves ===
The Happy Little Elves are a parody of The Smurfs, who appeared more often in the show's earlier episodes, e.g. watched on videocassette in "Some Enchanted Evening". They are a favorite of Lisa and Maggie Simpson. Bart, however, hates them; he mainly refers to them as either "those stupid elves", "The Crappy Little Elves", or "The Little Green Idiots". Their movies include Return of The Happy Little Elves, an unnamed Christmas movie as seen in "Simpsons Roasting on an Open Fire", The Happy Little Elves Meet The Curious Bear Cubs ("Some Enchanted Evening"), The Happy Little Elves in Tinkly Winkly Town, and The Happy Little Elves meet Fuzzy Snuggleduck (which was listed as an R-rated movie along with Thelma & Louise and The Erotic Awakening of S on Rancho Relaxo's cable system). They were first mentioned in a short on The Tracey Ullman Show entitled "Scary Movie". The most recent appearance they had was in "Homer's Adventures Through the Windshield Glass" in 2023. In more current episodes, they appear as wall decorations in Maggie's and Lisa's rooms. They were also seen in The Simpsons Ride.

=== Helen Lovejoy ===
Helen Lovejoy (née Schwartzbaum; voiced by Maggie Roswell; understudied by Marcia Mitzman Gaven in "Tennis the Menace", "I'm Goin' to Praiseland" and "Large Marge" while Roswell was in a pay dispute) is Rev. Lovejoy's judgmental and gossipy wife, and the mother of Jessica Lovejoy. She introduced herself in the episode "Life on the Fast Lane" as "the gossipy wife of the minister". Her catchphrase is "What about the children?! Won't somebody please think of the children!?" which she always says among a crowd when something bad is happening in the city. In "Wedding for Disaster", the Parson implies Helen is a transgender woman who used to be named Harold Schwartzbaum. In "E Pluribus Wiggum", it is revealed that Helen is a Republican (she is seen at the Springfield Republican meeting, which takes place in a scary castle atop a hill). In the non-canon "Treehouse of Horror XX" story, "Don't Have a Cow, Mankind", Helen is Lisa's godmother. She also serves as an antagonist to Marge Simpson as she usually is the one who opposes or antagonizes her. While in her extrovert "Belladonna" personality she displayed bisexual tendencies, inviting Marge to join her and Timothy's tryst – albeit unaware that it's Marge's voice she can hear.

=== Herman Hermann ===
Herman Hermann (voiced by Harry Shearer) is the one-armed owner of Herman's Military Antiques. In reply to a question by Bart, he insinuates that he lost his arm when he stuck it out the window of a school bus. In the episode "To Cur with Love", he is seen in a flashback losing his arm hitchhiking when he is sideswiped by an animal control van. A brilliant military tactician, Herman was instrumental in Bart's victory in water balloon combat against Nelson and in the negotiation of the peace treaty between the two combatants in "Bart the General", which is his first and most significant appearance.

Herman is often portrayed as a crook, having sold Abraham Simpson a fez by falsely claiming it was previously owned by Napoleon; Herman then advertised Abe's old hat as "the hat McKinley was shot in". He also tried to sell counterfeit jeans out of the Simpsons' garage, but was foiled by Marge Simpson in "The Springfield Connection". In a parody of Pulp Fiction he once captured Chief Wiggum and Snake and held them hostage, but was accidentally knocked unconscious by Milhouse with a medieval flail, rescuing them. He is always seen as a somewhat dangerous character, dressing in military fatigues, and speaking in a slow, gravelly voice (he is also often seen with an unlit cigarette in his mouth). In the opening credits of a later episode the billboard reads, 'Herman's Military Antiques (and guns)'. It is revealed and mentioned at various points that he keeps a loaded shotgun under the counter, and has various other firearms at his disposal.

Harry Shearer does an impression of George H. W. Bush for the voice. Herman's facial appearance is modeled after Simpsons writer John Swartzwelder. The original idea behind Herman, said Groening, was that each time he appeared, he would give a different explanation for how he lost his arm. However, the second joke, involving Herman having stuck his arm in a ball return at a bowling alley, got cut, and the writers never pursued the idea until "To Cur with Love".

=== Hubert Wong ===
Hubert Wong (voiced by Tress MacNeille in 2016–2020, Rosalie Chiang in 2023–present, Simu Liu as an adult in "When Nelson Met Lisa") is a second-grader in Mrs. Hoover's class who is friends with Lisa.

== J ==
=== Dr. J. Loren Pryor ===
Dr. J. Loren Pryor (voiced by Harry Shearer) is the school psychologist. He is based on an early design for Seymour Skinner and first appears in "Bart the Genius" where he decides to send Bart to a school for gifted children after Bart cheats on a test. Bart later approaches him to request returning to Springfield Elementary.

In "Bart Gets an 'F'", he tells him that if Bart does not shape up, he may have to repeat the fourth grade.

He appears again, discussing Bart's problems at school and Lisa's special gift in a flashback sequence of "Lisa's Sax". In this episode he also inadvertently reveals that Milhouse Van Houten possesses "flamboyantly homosexual" tendencies. Pryor does not appear again for several years until the episode "See Homer Run", in which he tells Lisa that she is going through a developmental condition. Jon Vitti named the character for his prying into the children's lives.

=== Jack Marley ===
Jack Marley (voiced by Dan Castellaneta with a voice resembling Droopy Dog) is a former worker at the Nuclear Plant who was forced to retire with a lavish retirement party. He tries to get out of it by saying his job was all he had, since he never married and his dog died, but Mr. Burns' hired goons throw him out anyway. He is seen in "Marge in Chains" at the court as the foreman of Marge's trial.

Jack is later seen in "Simpson Tide" mopping the floor and informs Homer he is off the hook when all the Naval Judges leave, having been indicted in various scandals. He possibly lives in the Retirement Castle and is rarely seen in the series.

=== Jake the Barber ===
Jake the Barber (voiced by Dan Castellaneta in most episodes, Harry Shearer in "Lisa the Tree Hugger") is a barber who originated in one of the Tracey Ullman shorts, "Bart's Haircut". In the short, he cuts Bart's hair not to his liking and Bart tries several ways to hide it. Dan Castellaneta based the voice on comedian Bob Elliott.

The Old Barber made his last appearance in the twelfth season episode "Lisa the Tree Hugger". David Silverman had to create a model sheet of the Old Barber for Jim Reardon, who directed "22 Short Films About Springfield". Before then, there was no model sheet for the character.

=== Jamshed Nahasapeemapetilon ===
Jamshed "Jay" Nahasapeemapetilon (voiced by Nancy Cartwright as a child, Utkarsh Ambudkar as a young adult) is Apu's nephew and Sanjay's son. His first appearance is in "Homer the Heretic", when he is left in charge of the Kwik-E-Mart alone, he pulls out a gun, scaring Jimbo, Kearney and Dolph.

In "Much Apu About Something", he is a young adult and is now called "Jay". After Sanjay retires, he gives his share of the store to Jay and turns the Kwik-E-Mart into a healthy food market called Quick & Fresh.

=== Janey Powell ===
Janey Powell (voiced by Pamela Hayden from 1990 to 2020, Maggie Roswell in "Bart the Daredevil", Tress MacNeille in "The Burns Cage", Kimberly Brooks since 2022) is a classmate and friend of Lisa Simpson. Janey first appeared in "Moaning Lisa" and is Lisa's closest friend. She has been at Lisa's sleepovers, and Lisa is seen watching cartoons at her house on numerous occasions. Her description on The Simpsons POG set described her as "Lisa's fair-weather friend". Though she is sometimes seen spending time with Lisa, other times she teases her along with the other children. She is not portrayed as being nearly as intelligent or nerdy as Lisa. Janey may have had a crush on Milhouse Van Houten, who has a crush on Lisa. She enjoys reading, babysitting and books, and she hates ice cream.

=== Jasper Beardsley ===
Jasper Beardsley (voiced by Harry Shearer) is one of the older residents of Springfield, often portrayed as Abraham Simpson's best friend. They have been friends since their youth, as seen in "$pringfield (Or, How I Learned to Stop Worrying and Love Legalized Gambling)". His most distinguishing features are his ultra-low, gravelly voice and very long and hard beard. Jasper made his first appearance in "Homer's Odyssey". He is a veteran of World War II, but (according to the episode "Marge and Homer Turn a Couple Play") he attempted to avoid the draft by disguising himself as a woman. He stayed in Springfield to play in the local women's baseball league, along with his friend Abe, who was also avoiding the war but was exposed during a game. In a deleted scene, it was shown that Jasper was the town pastor, prior to Reverend Lovejoy. He briefly served as substitute teacher of Lisa's class during which time he confiscated everything made of tin, got his beard caught in a pencil sharpener and threatened paddling for minor infractions such as looking out the window, talking out of turn or staring at his sandals.

In the subplot of the season nine episode, "Lisa the Simpson", Jasper put himself in crude "suspended animation" in the Kwik-E-Mart's freezer, and under advice from Dr. Nick, Apu kept him frozen. When Jasper's frozen form became popular with customers, Apu started exploiting the spectacle, and transformed the Kwik-E-Mart into a special interest store dealing with weird items, or perfectly ordinary ones which had been made out to be abnormal, called the Freak-E-Mart. Jasper was accidentally unfrozen, and stepped out into what he thought was a future world, just as Apu was considering selling him to the Rich Texan. In the episode "I Don't Wanna Know Why the Caged Bird Sings" Jasper mentions he is a diabetic (which would explain why he has a wooden leg, as seen in part two of the "Who Shot Mr. Burns" two-parter, though past episodes, such as "Boy Scoutz 'n the Hood", "A Streetcar Named Marge" and "The PTA Disbands" all show that Jasper's legs are real).

In The Simpsons Super Spectacular #13, published by Bongo Comics, it is revealed that in the '60s, Jasper was part of a group called 'the League of Superheroes', under the name Super Jasper. He fought crime alongside the Komedian (Krusty the Clown), Betty Firecrocker (Jacqueline Bouvier) and the original Pie Man (Abraham Simpson).

=== Jebediah Springfield ===
Jebediah Obadiah Zachariah Jedediah Springfield (a.k.a. Hans Sprungfeld; voiced by Harry Shearer in later appearances, Hank Azaria in "McMansion & Wife") is the founder of the town of Springfield. According to legend, Jebediah Springfield and his partner Shelbyville Manhattan led a band that left Maryland in search of "New Sodom" due to a misinterpretation of the Bible, but they parted ways over political differences: though both men are devoted to chastity and abstinence, Manhattan wanted to let people be free to marry their cousins if they wish, which Springfield strongly opposed. It was then that Manhattan went on to found the rival town of Shelbyville, taking half of the settlers with him.

Springfield had many famous quotations, such as "A noble spirit embiggens the smallest man". He also wears a coonskin cap. The Springfield Marathon commemorates an occasion on which he ran across six states to avoid his creditors. In "The Telltale Head", Bart beheaded the statue, thinking that this would make him more popular. In reality, the town became depressed and angry, leaving Bart to endure "The Tell-Tale Heart"-style guilt before putting it back on. This episode is referenced in multiple Simpsons video games such as The Simpsons: Bart vs. the Space Mutants, where the statue's head serves as a power-up item, or The Simpsons: Road Rage and The Simpsons: Hit & Run, where characters can kick or ram Jebediah's head off the statue. This was also referenced in the 2009–present opening sequence used since the twentieth season.

Many Jebediah legends have been debunked during the run of the series. For instance, "The Telltale Head" repeatedly refers to Jebediah killing a bear with his bare hands, but on the news, Kent Brockman reveals that recent historical evidence suggests the bear actually killed Jebediah. On a field trip to Springfield's historic "Olde Springfield Towne", Bart uncovers other inconsistencies in the Jebediah legend, such as that he fought at Fort Ticonderoga the same day as the first Whacking Day; it turned out that Whacking Day only began in 1924 as an excuse to beat up the Irish.

Most of Springfield's biography is revealed in the 1996 episode "Lisa the Iconoclast", wherein Lisa Simpson discovers Jebediah Springfield's biggest secret: he was formerly a bloodthirsty pirate named Hans Sprungfeld, who once brawled with George Washington and lost after Washington crushed Sprungfeld's genitals in one of his sets of iron false teeth. Sprungfeld fled and changed his name in 1795 to hide his identity. He was well known for his "silver tongue" (literally; a metal prosthetic tongue, his original tongue having been bitten off by a Turkish pirate in a grog house fight). Before he died of diphtheria, he wrote his confession on a scrap of canvas that he hid in a fife. The canvas scrap formed the "missing piece" of the famously incomplete 1796 Gilbert Stuart portrait of George Washington; Sprungfeld picked it up during a fight against Washington which occurred while the latter was having his portrait painted. Lisa decides not to reveal this secret to the people of Springfield, seeing that the myth of Jebediah has brought out the good in everyone and that the true story will cause them to lose hope and morale within themselves.

=== Jimbo Jones ===
Corky James "Jimbo" Jones (voiced by Tress MacNeille in "The Telltale Head", "When Flanders Failed", "Bart the Murderer", "Lisa on Ice", "Lisa the Skeptic" and "The Joy of Sect", Pamela Hayden in 1991–2024, Mo Collins in 2025–present) is a bully at Springfield Elementary who wears a purple knit cap and a black T-shirt emblazoned with a menacing skull. He is a sixth-grader and is often seen hanging out with Dolph, Kearney and sometimes Nelson. He made his first appearance in the episode "The Telltale Head". He is acknowledged as the leader of the gang of bullies in Nelson's absence. He enjoys intimidating his schoolmates and shoplifting. It is hinted that he comes from a well-off family, most notably in season six's "The PTA Disbands" when—with the school closed for a teacher's strike—he and his mother watch soap operas and sip tea together in a well-furnished living room. In season four's "New Kid on the Block", he briefly dates Laura Powers until she leaves him for crying in front of Moe after Bart exposed his true personality by prank-calling him.

In season seven's "Bart the Fink", Bart discovers that Jimbo's real name is Corky.

In "Beware My Cheating Bart", it is revealed that he is bald on top, with hair around it. Jimbo's other known aliases are Jamesbo, Dr. J and Hector Gutierrez. In season eighteen's "24 Minutes" it is revealed that his mother's name is Carol. Jimbo is a portmanteau nickname for executive producer James L. Brooks. Jimbo runs for mayor in the Season 17 episode "See Homer Run", with a campaign slogan of "Tough on Nerds. Tougher on Dorks".

=== Johnny Tightlips ===
Jonathan "Johnny Tightlips" Schmallippe (voiced by Hank Azaria) born Giovanni Silencio, is a Springfield Mafia gangster who is the second-in-command of Fat Tony. He usually says very little, for fear of being accused of being a "squealer", but his reticence is so extreme it backfires, becoming unhelpful to everyone, including Fat Tony and himself. However, in recent episodes, he does, sometimes, elaborate whenever he feels like it, just as long as he does not say too much.

In his debut episode "Insane Clown Poppy", there is a shootout in Fat Tony's mansion and Johnny was shot by accident. When the shootout ended, Louie, one of Fat Tony's capos, then asked in concern to Johnny on where he is injured, resulting Johnny to say, "I ain't sayin' nuthin'!", and when Louie asked in concern on what he, himself, will tell the doctor, Johnny, again in his usual reticent nature, says, "Tell him to suck a lemon." Afterwards, he then officially became a supporting minor character working for Fat Tony and the Mafia in the series, starting in the 13th-season episode, "Poppa's Got a Brand New Badge".

=== Jub-Jub ===
Jub-Jub is Selma Bouvier's pet iguana and was originally owned by Aunt Gladys. He was first seen in "Selma's Choice". Gladys gives Jub-Jub to Jacqueline Bouvier, who is highly unattached to him. As a result, she later passes him on to Selma. Selma once said that Jub-Jub will eat her remains after she dies. The name Jub-Jub was coined by then-writer Conan O'Brien. He often said nonsensical things around the office for no apparent reason, one of which was "Jub-Jub" (There is, however, a Jubjub bird in "The Hunting of the Snark").

Fans of Sports Radio 1310 in Dallas voted that Jub-Jub be the new nickname of morning radio host George Dunham. O'Brien, on October 17, 2007, mentioned his creation of Jub Jub and asked Joe Buck, the play-by-play commentator of the MLB World Series on FOX, to say it during his broadcast. O'Brien promised $1,000 to the charity of the announcer's choice. On October 24, 2007, during Game 1 of the 2007 World Series, Buck called field level reporter, Chris Myers, "our own little Jub-Jub". Jub-Jub was used as the first Twitter hash tag for O'Brien's "Legally Prohibited from Being Funny on Television Tour" in 2010.

=== Judge Constance Harm ===
Judge Constance Harm (voiced by Jane Kaczmarek) is a harsh, unforgiving judge and disciplinarian. She enjoys creating cruel punishments for criminals in her court and frightening them with a miniature guillotine on the bench. Her name is a play on "constant harm". In "The Parent Rap", she says "When I was a little boy," revealing that she is transgender. The character is a parody of Judge Judy Sheindlin.

In "On a Clear Day I Can't See My Sister", she reveals she has a husband. Bart infuriates her by suggesting that she became a judge instead of finding a husband, and when Judge Harm reveals that she is married, Bart insults him, infuriating her further, resulting in her expanding the restraining order to make him stay even further away from Lisa. Although Judge Snyder resolves court cases, Judge Harm has mainly been used for handing down negative verdicts such as sentencing a family member to prison. She also appears in "Brawl in the Family", "Barting Over", "The Wandering Juvie", "Brake My Wife, Please", "Chief of Hearts" and "One Angry Lisa".

=== Judge Snyder ===
Judge Roy Snyder (voiced by Harry Shearer in season 2 to 32, Kevin Michael Richardson since season 36) is a Springfield judge known for his lenient punishments and somewhat unorthodox rulings (as in the episode "Sweets and Sour Marge" when he bans sugar from Springfield).

Lionel Hutz once described his problem with Judge Snyder in the episode "Marge in Chains":

Well, he's had it in for me ever since I kinda ran over his dog... Well, replace the word "kinda" with the word "repeatedly" and the word "dog" with "son".

The character was originally named "Judge Moulton" (as mentioned in the episode "Bart Gets Hit by a Car"), but show runners Bill Oakley and Josh Weinstein did not know that, and called him "Snyder". His appearance is modeled on Robert Bork. Snyder's skin color has gone back and forth between yellow and brown repeatedly throughout the series. His skin is currently brown.

=== Julio ===
Julio Franco (voiced by Hank Azaria from season 14 to 31, Tony Rodriguez since season 32, singing voice provided by Mario Jose) is a gay man who is attracted to Grady, although Grady breaks up with him. He is employed as a hairdresser. According to "Eternal Moonshine of the Simpson Mind", Julio is from Costa Rica, though this is contradicted in "The Burns Cage" which states he is from Cuba. He later married Tada, and has an affair with Duffman. He also is a photographer and takes photos of Marge and her friends. He is seen attending First Church of Springfield. In the episode "E Pluribus Wiggum", he attends a Democratic Party meeting. In "The Burns Cage" he starts dating Smithers, but breaks up with him after realizing that Smithers is still in love with Mr. Burns.

=== "Just stamp the ticket" man ===
The "Just stamp the ticket" man (voiced by Hank Azaria) appeared in a number of earlier episodes, but was never named. This man first appears in "When Flanders Failed" when he goes to the Leftorium to get his parking validated because it is the only store that does it without requiring a purchase. Ned Flanders says he is "right as rain, or, as we say around here, left as rain" but the man bluntly responds "Just stamp the ticket". His next appearance is in "Homer Alone", when the Squeaky Voiced Teen tries to hand him a flyer, he brushes him off by saying "Don't touch me". In a later episode, "Mr. Plow", he tells Barney Gumble (who is handing out flyers dressed as Lullabuy$'s Big Baby) that he "sickens" him. He reappears again in "Homer's Barbershop Quartet", at the Springfield Swap Meet, he derides Marge's "cool" wishbone necklaces, stating he doubted his "son or daughter is that stupid". The character also appears in the episodes "Homer Loves Flanders" (who tells Homer that, if Homer actually went to work for eight days instead of camping out outside the ticket window for football tickets, he would have earned enough to get his tickets from a scalper), "Homer and Apu" (as one of the angry customers in the beginning of the episode), "Bart of Darkness" (in which he punched a hippie for singing "Sunshine on My Shoulders" during a town-wide heat wave) and "Grampa vs. Sexual Inadequacy" (in which he punches Homer in the face for questioning his ability to sexually satisfy his wife). In "Simpson Tide" he has his biggest appearance as the Naval Reserve recruiter who begs Homer not to read the "Are you a homosexual?" question on the application due to the "don't ask, don't tell" policy that was in effect at the time.

== K ==
=== Kearney Zzyzwicz ===
Kearney Zzyzwicz (/ˈdʒiːzwɪtʃ/ DJEEZ-vitch Polish pronunciation: [zˈzɨvit͡ʂ], voiced by Nancy Cartwright) is one of Springfield Elementary's many bullies. He is a fifth-grader and has a buzz cut. He wears a torn white T-shirt, blue shorts, and studded wristbands. He made his first appearance in the episode "The Telltale Head". Although he looks and sounds to be around Jimbo and Dolph's age, Kearney is actually older (a later episode revealed that Kearney is 19 years old, though, according to his voice actress, Nancy Cartwright, Kearney is actually 14). He is the only Springfield Elementary School student who remembers the Watergate scandal and the 1976 Bicentennial (according to Principal Skinner), was in the third-grade class of Otto the bus driver (according to Otto), owns a car (even though he rode the school bus on "A Milhouse Divided", "The Mook, the Chef, the Wife, and Her Homer" and "How the Test Was Won"), regularly shaves, has custody of a child from a divorce, is old enough to vote in a general U.S. election, was sent to prison (though "Marge Be Not Proud" and "Lisa the Skeptic" depicted Kearney in juvenile hall), and pays taxes.

In "She of Little Faith", it is revealed that Kearney dated Jimbo's mother, Carol. In the same episode, it is revealed that he is on the church council of the First Church of Springfield and is "a teenager and the parent of a teenager" (implying that the son he introduced in "A Milhouse Divided" may also be older than his outward appearance, though past episodes also imply that Kearney is not a teenager). Despite being of the legal age in the United States to purchase and drink it (as seen in "El Viaje Misterioso de Nuestro Jomer"), Kearney often relies on (or tricks) Homer into procuring alcohol for him and his friends, as seen in "The Springfield Connection" when Homer tells Marge that he is double-parked because he is buying beer for "those kids over there", "Simpsoncalifragilisticexpiala(Annoyed Grunt)cious" when Kearney applies for the nanny job and Homer tells him that he keeps some Schnapps in Maggie's crib, and "Last Tap Dance in Springfield", in which Kearney tricks Homer into driving him, Dolph and Jimbo to the liquor store to buy Jack Daniels and "a carton of smokes" by impersonating Marge, and once used a fake ID (which Apu overlooked, as he was too depressed about being deported to care that Kearney was committing a crime—and ultimately asked him about getting one for himself—as seen in "Much Apu About Nothing").

Kearney's last name (Zzyzwicz) was revealed in a computer file in season 18's "24 Minutes". Prior to that episode, Kearney's surname was never mentioned. Kearney's newly revealed last name implies that he may be of Polish descent, or may also be inspired by the town of Zzyzx. In "Bart Gets a 'Z'", he can be seen sitting in the back row of Bart's classroom, implying Kearney is a fourth-grader. His father was shown on the season eight episode "The Homer They Fall", but in "O Brother, Where Bart Thou?", Kearney reveals that both his parents are incarcerated and they only meet when the prison and insane asylum have their annual mixer.

=== Kearney Zzyzwicz Jr. ===
Kearney Zzyzwicz Jr. (voiced by Nancy Cartwright) is the son of Kearney. He first appeared in "A Milhouse Divided" in the school bus when Kearney was mentioning his divorce, after that having recurring minor appearances throughout the series.

=== Kirk Van Houten ===
Kirk Evelyn Van Houten (voiced by Hank Azaria) is the father of Milhouse, and the remarried husband (and cousin) of Luann Van Houten. He is friends with Homer Simpson. Kirk bears a striking resemblance to his wife, and wears glasses just like her and their son. He first appeared in the season 3 episode "Bart's Friend Falls in Love", but it would not be until season eight's "A Milhouse Divided" that Kirk was portrayed as a stereotypical middle-aged male loser and deadbeat dad. Much of his character revolves around his extreme emotional depression after his divorce from his wife Luann. Luann got custody of Milhouse when they divorced, but Kirk has visiting rights and is often seen with Milhouse in later episodes. The Van Houtens got back together in season 17's Milhouse of Sand and Fog and officially remarried in the nineteenth season episode "Little Orphan Millie". In that episode it was established that Kirk is of Dutch ancestry on his father's side and has a feud with the members of the family that have a Danish ancestry. Kirk previously served in the U.S. Army, and attended Gudger College. Kirk's mother apparently is of Greek ancestry, based on the nineteenth-season episode "Husbands and Knives", in which Milhouse says, "But that's the money Yiayia Sophia gave me for Greek Orthodox Easter!"

According to Luann, Kirk was not a very good provider, and she had to borrow money from her sister to make ends meet and steal donated clothes from the town's church so she could have a wardrobe. When Luann demands a divorce, Kirk is all too happy to oblige. Unfortunately, he loses his middle-management job at Southern Cracker, a job given to him by Luann's father, as a result. Kirk briefly attempts a career as a singer-songwriter, recording a demo tape of an original song titled "Can I Borrow A Feeling", with mediocre results. Later, he attempts to get back together with Luann by singing the song to her. Luann does not reciprocate Kirk's feelings.

Kirk reveals in "I Am Furious (Yellow)", in which he visits his son's school on career day, that he was currently employed as an assistant to the guy who puts fliers under people's windshield wipers. Kirk also had a job standing on the curb holding a sign directing people to a condo development and worked as a scarecrow protecting a soy-bean crop, which resulted in his eye being gouged by a crow. Since being fired from the cracker company, Kirk seems to be unable to maintain a steady job. He once shouted at Luann that she had to keep up the alimony payments she owed him, and he has been seen at the Springfield unemployment office, perhaps suggesting that alimony and unemployment benefits are his only steady sources of income. Kirk was put in jail in the episode "Pranksta Rap" for "kidnapping" Bart which he greatly enjoyed due to him being envied by women and fed three meals a day. In The Simpsons Movie, Kirk is briefly seen attending an Alcoholics Anonymous meeting.

Azaria has stated that Kirk's voice is "a bad Milhouse impression".

=== Kumiko Albertson ===
Kumiko Albertson (née Nakamura) (voiced by Tress MacNeille from season 25 to 31, Jenny Yokobori since season 32) is a Japanese manga fan and artist from Osaka, Japan. Kumiko first appears in "Married to the Blob" when she walked past Comic Book Guy's shop, but stopped when she saw him through the window and liked him. Kumiko and Comic Book Guy get married in the Android's Dungeon. Often in her appearances in the series, she is seen next to Comic Book Guy. In "Springfield Splendor", she finds Lisa's art therapy drawings, and sells them at The Android's Dungeon as a graphic novel, called Sad Girl.

== L ==
=== Legs and Louie ===
Legs (voiced by Hank Azaria from 1991 to 1995, 1998 and 2003, Harry Shearer since 1995, Karl Wiedergott in "Trilogy of Error" and "Chief of Hearts") and Louie (voiced by Dan Castellaneta in most episodes, Harry Shearer in "Mayored to the Mob", "I'm Goin' to Praiseland" and "Chief of Hearts") are two gangsters and members of the Springfield Mafia who accompany Fat Tony at all times. The two lack any real definitive characteristic and are almost always seen together. Legs has a dark blonde short haircut and raspy voice. Louie has a slight black afro and a more high-pitched, even squeaky tone. Castellaneta based the voice on actor Joe Pesci, one of the several references to Goodfellas used in the episode "Bart the Murderer". Louie says that tear gas is "[his] one weakness", though this is likely an embellishment. Dan Castellaneta was nominated for Primetime Emmy Award for Outstanding Voice-Over Performance in 2011 for the voice of Louie, Homer Simpson, Barney Gumble and Krusty the Clown thanks to the episode "Donnie Fatso".

=== Lenny Leonard ===
Lenford "Lenny" Leonard (voiced by Harry Shearer) is friends with Carl Carlson, Homer Simpson, Moe Szyslak and Barney Gumble. Although he works at the Springfield Nuclear Power Plant and possesses a master's degree in nuclear physics, he is often portrayed as a blue-collar working man.

Lenny appears to be well liked by the Simpson family; on one occasion, Marge and the kids build a prayer shrine for him when thinking he was hospitalized in "Hello Gutter, Hello Fadder". In "Sleeping with the Enemy", the Simpson family has a cake inscribed "Happy Labor Day Lenny". In "Pranksta Rap", it is revealed Marge has a picture of Lenny in her hair.

Lenny's full name has not been treated with consistency. After years of being identified only as "Lenny", Homer addressed him as "Lenford" in the season 13 episode "The Frying Game", and Lisa addressed him as "Mr. Leonard" in the season 15 episode "The Ziff Who Came To Dinner". This would appear to make his full name "Lenford Leonard"—but Bart addresses him as "Lenny Lenford" in the season 23 episode "At Long Last Leave".

Lenny and Carl are best friends, as they are rarely seen apart; their other friends are Homer, and regulars at Moe's including Barney Gumble and Moe Szyslak. Homer repeatedly confuses Lenny and Carl, and is shocked to learn on one occasion that Lenny is white, and Carl is black. To guide himself, Homer has "Lenny = White, Carl = Black" on his hand. He once muttered to himself, "Is that right?" while reading it. In "Helter Shelter", Homer exclaims, "That's Lenny? I wanted the black one!" When Mr. Burns appears on a radio show in an attempt to boost his popularity in "Monty Can't Buy Me Love", Homer tells him that he has a list of jokes explaining the differences between white and black people; Homer later states, "White guys have names like Lenny, whereas black guys have names like Carl."

Lenny and Carl work at the Springfield Nuclear Power Plant alongside Homer Simpson. Despite his steady job, Lenny has been featured with several other jobs. On one occasion, he is promoted to head of the power plant when Mr. Burns goes bankrupt; which Smithers later describes to Homer Simpson as a "reign of terror". Homer considers Lenny to be the second richest man he knows. However, Lenny is once shown living in a dilapidated house, and asks Marge not to tell anyone how he lives. In one episode, he also works at a call center for the power company in Springfield. In another episode, he is shown living in a fancy, well-furnished modern apartment that happens to share a wall with a Jai-alai court. In a "future episode", it is shown Lenny is once again in charge of the power plant. On one occasion, it is implied he is an undercover agent whose target is Homer. At the Adult Education Annex, Lenny teaches a class on "How To Chew Tobacco". In one of Homer's daydreams, it is shown that Lenny is the President of the United States.

Lenny and Carl together rank sixth on IGN's Top 25 Simpsons Peripheral Characters.

=== Lewis Clark ===
Lewis Clark (voiced by Jo Ann Harris in 4 episodes, Nancy Cartwright in 7 episodes, Pamela Hayden in 2 episodes, Russi Taylor in 3 episodes, Tress MacNeille in 5 episodes, Kevin Michael Richardson in "Marge the Lumberjill", Kimberly Brooks since 2021) is an African-American character and one of Bart's friends and classmates at Springfield Elementary School. He can be seen playing the bassoon in the opening sequence of the show. He is usually seen with his best friend Richard. Although one of the most minor characters in the show, Lewis was shown in earlier seasons as part of Bart's main circle of friends, although his time lessened as the series progressed. Despite this, Lewis still appears frequently in scenes involving the Springfield children, and occasionally speaks. While Lewis has never had significant dialogue, he has been voiced by various characters throughout the series. Lewis's seeming insignificance to the show is underscored in the episode "Das Bus", in which Bart mistakenly calls him "Wendell". When corrected, Bart replies, "Just tell Wendell I said bye."

=== Lindsey Naegle ===
Lindsey Naegle (/ˈneɪɡəl/; voiced by Tress MacNeille) first appeared in the eighth season episode "The Itchy & Scratchy & Poochie Show". In that episode, she had no name and was known only as "The Generic Female TV Executive". She appeared again in "Girly Edition", also as a generic female TV executive (only her hair and facial features differed from her first appearance).

In "They Saved Lisa's Brain", she was introduced as "Lindsey Naegle", a member of the Springfield Chapter of Mensa, and has since become a recurring character. The writers modeled Naegle on a number of network executives that they have encountered while working on the show.

The character's surname comes from Hollywood talent agent Sue Naegle, president of HBO Entertainment and wife of Simpsons writer Dana Gould. Writer Matt Selman chose the first name "Lindsey" because he thought it sounded like the name of an annoyingly talkative woman. Naegle-like characters have appeared throughout the series, such as the OmniTouch Rep from "Make Room for Lisa" and Laramie executive Mindy from "E-I-E-I-(Annoyed Grunt)". In "Blame It on Lisa", she readily explains that she frequently changes jobs because she is a sexual predator. Chris Turner, author of the book Planet Simpson, called Naegle "an excellent allegory for the modern corporate age: you don't see through her because there's nothing else to see." Her political allegiances are not concrete: In "You Kent Always Say What You Want", she is shown at the Republican Party headquarters; in "E Pluribus Wiggum", she is conversely depicted as a Democrat. In "Marge vs. Singles, Seniors, Childless Couples and Teens and Gays", she is seen to lead SSCCATAGAPP's anti-youth campaign, declaring, "Children are the future, today belongs to me!"

=== Ling Bouvier ===
Ling Bouvier (voiced by Nancy Cartwright) is Selma's adopted daughter, the adopted niece of Marge and Homer, and the adopted cousin of Bart, Lisa and Maggie. In Season 16's "Goo Goo Gai Pan", Selma experiences menopause symptoms and becomes concerned that she will never fulfill her dream of being a mother. After an unsuccessful attempt to adopt one of Cletus's children (Cletus having given up the baby by mistake. "Seems I misheard my wife. What she said was, she's tired of having rabies."), she takes up Lisa's proposal to adopt a baby from China. Since China does not allow unmarried people to adopt children, Selma convinces Homer to pretend that he is her husband. Although she succeeds in getting a baby from the adoption agency in Beijing, it is later discovered that her marriage to Homer is fake and Ling gets taken away from her. The Simpsons attempt to kidnap Ling back, but run into a confrontation with the head of the adoption agency, Madame Wu. Selma entreats her to let her keep the baby, to which Madame Wu agrees. Since then, Ling has made several appearances on the show including as Maggie's playmate in "Rome-old and Julie-eh". In season 24's "The Changing of the Guardian", she has grown to a preschooler and shown as precociously talented, able to play musical instruments and practice painting.

=== Llewellyn Sinclair ===
Llewellyn Sinclair (voiced by Jon Lovitz) is a theater director introduced in "A Streetcar Named Marge" who often works in Springfield, known for his perfectionism and sour temperament. He is most notable for directing the musical theatrical production of A Streetcar Named Desire dubbed Oh, Streetcar! in which Marge Simpson played the role of Blanche Dubois. He told the actors of this production at the time that he had directed three plays in his lifetime and had three heart attacks, and that he cared so much about his work that he was planning on a fourth.

Years later he directed Krusty the Clown in The Salesman's Bad Day, a heavily reworked take on Death of a Salesman since the rights were too much for him to afford. He also directed one of Springfield Elementary's second-grade plays where he got frustrated at Ralph Wiggum, and attempted to direct a play of Oklahoma! until his sour attitude turned everybody else on the production against him and Marge took control of the production. His sister runs the Ayn Rand School for Tots.

=== Lois Pennycandy ===
Lois Pennycandy (voiced by Pamela Hayden) is the executive assistant to Krusty the Clown. She swayed Krusty into visiting Bart after he saved Krusty from jail time, and later reunited him with his estranged father the Rabbi Hyman Krustofski. She was at Krusty's side during the auditions in which Robert Terwilliger became Krusty's new sidekick, and was at Krusty's "funeral" when he was presumed dead after crashing his private plane into a cliff. In a phone conversation, Marge once asked her, "How can [Krusty] hurt someone who loves him so?" While looking at a framed photo of Krusty, Pennycandy replied, "Oh, Mrs. Simpson, I've wasted my womanhood asking that same question." Her only speaking roles are in "Like Father, Like Clown" and "Krusty Gets Kancelled. Her name alludes to both Miss Moneypenny from the James Bond series and the actress who originated the role, Lois Maxwell. Although rarely featured on the show, she has been a recurring character in the Simpsons comic book series.

=== Lou ===
Lou (voiced by Hank Azaria from season 1 to 31; Harry Shearer in "Saddlesore Galactica" and "Treehouse of Horror XXVII"; Alex Désert since season 32) is the police sergeant of the Springfield Police Department and by far the most intelligent and competent officer of the Springfield Police. He primarily serves as a foil to Chief Wiggum, and often takes the time to point out his chief's mistakes, as well as resent Wiggum, and be aware of his ineptitude. He was also married to a woman named Amy, but later divorced.

Al Jean and Mike Reiss named Lou after Major League Baseball player Lou Whitaker, and Azaria based Lou's voice on that of actor Sylvester Stallone. Though he has nearly always been African American, he was mistakenly animated with yellow in "There's No Disgrace Like Home" and his other first-season appearances. Lou permanently became an African-American character in "Bart vs. Thanksgiving", where he was animated to Eddie's voice of Harry Shearer and vice versa.

=== Luann Van Houten ===
Luann Van Houten (née Mussolini; voiced by Maggie Roswell) is the mother of Bart's childhood best friend Milhouse. For the period from 1999 to 2002, during which Roswell left the show, she became a primarily nonspeaking character. Since the season 8 episode, "A Milhouse Divided", Luann was depicted as a promiscuous single mother, who pushed her love life in the face of her ex-husband, Kirk. She first appeared in "Homer Defined", as a concerned mother who barred Milhouse from being Bart's friend due to Bart being a bad influence. She wears glasses and has blue hair, traits she shares with her husband and son. Her mother is an Italian who abused Milhouse whenever he spoke English. In "Lemon of Troy", it is revealed that Luann originally came from Springfield's bitter rival, Shelbyville, but moved to Springfield early in life, presumably with her father, as her mother remained in Italy. In "A Milhouse Divided", it is revealed she has a sister (from whom she borrows money, as her husband does not provide for her at all), but whom we never meet. In "Marge Be Not Proud", Bart turned to Luann for motherly comfort after Marge has become distant with him.

Luann was married to her cousin Kirk for several years, giving birth to a son, Milhouse, yet the marriage was an unhappy one. After an argument over a game of Pictionary, she left Kirk after he remarks he cannot draw "dignity", since he gave it up when he married her. Although Kirk found the new liberty of a single life tough, Luann uses her newfound freedom to live life in the fast lane, advising Marge to forget everything she thought she knew about her, to which Marge replied that she really did not know anything about Luann at all. Luann began dating American Gladiator Pyro shortly after her divorce with Kirk for a few seasons, but was caught cheating on him with his best friend, "Gladiator Gyro". When Apu Nahasapeemapetilon was a bachelor, Luann was one of his bachelorettes. In "Milhouse of Sand and Fog", it is revealed that Luann had also gone out with Disco Stu as well and had begun a relationship with Sea Captain.

In "Milhouse of Sand and Fog" the Van Houtens reunited. Since then, they are often seen together (although in the episode "Ice Cream of Margie (with the Light Blue Hair)", Kirk was seen with Milhouse at a single father's outing, indicating the couple had split up, yet again). As of "Little Orphan Millie", they are remarried. In the 2014 episode "The War of Art", Kirk and Luann sell a painting to the Simpsons, which later turns out to be a forgery of a valuable piece.

=== Lucius Sweet ===
Lucius Sweet (voiced by Paul Winfield) is modeled after Don King. He is the former boxing manager for Moe Szyslak and current boxing manager for Drederick Tatum. He learned Homer's talent when Homer started boxing people like Boxcar Bob. He asked Moe for him to fight heavy weight champ Drederick Tatum. They made a deal for Homer to make three rounds against Tatum. When Homer was fighting, he could not even make one round, causing him to declare Moe a loser in disappointment.

Lucius has a speaking role in "The Trouble with Trillions".

He later appeared a few more times in the series and The Simpsons Movie. Lucius is on the Springfield Wall of Fame.

=== Luigi Risotto ===
Luigi Risotto (voiced by Hank Azaria) is the proprietor of Luigi's, a Springfield Italian restaurant. He is a parody of the "Italian pasta/pizza chef" stereotype (and in fact is on a bowling team called "The Stereotypes", along with Cletus Spuckler, Captain Horatio McCallister and Groundskeeper Willie), but seems to be aware of his status as a stock character. He is polite to his customers and treats them with respect when they order and then loudly insults and belittles them to his cook Salvatore, fully aware that they can hear him from the kitchen. In the episode "The Last of the Red Hat Mamas", he reveals that he does not speak Italian, only Italian-accented English. It is hinted that Luigi is an illegal immigrant, even though he tried to run for mayor, telling Springfielders, "I make-a you the good government, just how-a you like it!" The animators copied Luigi's appearance from a chef that was on the front of a pizza box.

=== Lunchlady Dora ===
Lunchlady Dora, formerly known as Lunchlady Doris, (voiced by Doris Grau from 1991 to 1997, Tress MacNeille since 2006) is a sardonic cafeteria chef and lunch lady for Springfield Elementary. She can frequently be seen serving deeply unpleasant meals made from horse testicles, grade-F meat (made of circus animals and filler), beef hearts that have been on the cafeteria kitchen floor, shredded newspapers, and ground-up gym mats due to school budget cuts. She made a handful of appearances in her secondary job as a school nurse. In "Whacking Day", Doris took the job as school nurse to earn two paychecks, but in "'Round Springfield", she reveals that she was put in the position of school nurse because of school budget cuts (even having Groundskeeper Willie as a French teacher).

In "The Simpsons Comics", when asked by Milhouse on the school's new chat show, Moments with Milhouse (formerly Moments with Martin) why the school meals are so bad, Doris admits that a third-grader had once mistakenly eaten her beloved hamster, and she had "sworn culinary revenge ever since".

Following Grau's death in 1995, Lunchlady Doris was retired out of respect for over 10 years. Due to the delay between recording some episodes and the time they actually air, Grau's voice was included in episodes airing as late as 1997 such as "Lisa's Sax".

Lunchlady Dora is seen as a silent background character until she speaks in the 18th season during "The Mook, the Chef, the Wife and Her Homer", where she is voiced by Tress MacNeille, season 19's "The Debarted", where she is again voiced by Tress MacNeille but with a different voice, and season 20's "Father Knows Worst". Lunchlady Dora has been seen dating Hans Moleman.

In "Dark Knight Court", Groundskeeper Willie refers to her as "Lunchlady Dora". According to Simpsons writer Michael Price, this name change happened out of respect for Grau's death. Al Jean later confirmed on Twitter that Dora was Doris' sister, meaning the two are separate characters.

=== Lurleen Lumpkin ===
Lurleen Lumpkin (voiced by Beverly D'Angelo in "Colonel Homer", "Papa Don't Leech" and "P.S. I Hate You", Doris Grau in "Marge vs. the Monorail") is an aspiring country singer who is initially managed by Homer in "Colonel Homer". Homer discovers her in a redneck bar in the middle of nowhere and is amazed by her voice. He decides to help her launch a singing career, much to the chagrin of Marge. Grateful for Homer's help, she becomes attracted to him and tries to lure him with an erotic song called "Bunk with Me Tonight". Homer, who had been ignorant of this, suddenly realizes that managing Lurleen could hurt his marriage, so he quits as her manager. A saddened Lurleen sings a song called "Stand By Your Manager".

Lurleen next appears briefly in "Marge vs. the Monorail", sporting torn clothing and an unkempt hairstyle; the episode reveals that she has recently undergone treatment at the Betty Ford Clinic and "spent last night in a ditch". Her voice matches that of Lunchlady Doris, rather than her soft, Southern voice she had when she was first introduced. In "Krusty Gets Kancelled", she is again briefly seen in the center square of Springfield Squares.

The nineteenth-season episode "Papa Don't Leech" follows up on her story with her moving into the Simpsons' home and taking a waitress job at Moe's to pay a $12 million tax bill, having lost most of her earnings over the course of several failed marriages to men who all heavily resembled Homer. In this episode she is again voiced by Beverly D'Angelo, who also wrote the songs. She has a father named Royce "Boss Hogg" Lumpkin, who was never supportive of her and was missing for years. Marge undertakes efforts to find him and reunite him with Lurleen. As soon as it happens, Lurleen writes a new, upbeat composition called "Daddy's Back", but Royce sells the song, taking the writing credits for himself (but altering some lyrics) to the Dixie Chicks. Lurleen confronts Royce and reveals the truth to the Dixie Chicks, who assault him with their musical instruments and invite Lurleen to join their tour. Lurleen once again ends up engaged to a man who looks very much like Homer and tours as an opening act for the Dixie Chicks.

== M ==
=== Dr. Marvin Monroe ===
Dr. Marvin Monroe (voiced by Harry Shearer) is a psychotherapist who first appeared in the first-season episode "There's No Disgrace Like Home". Homer pawns the family television to afford a session with Monroe for him and his dysfunctional family. The failed attempt at therapy culminates with the Simpsons electroshocking each other endlessly, to the point of causing a chaotic brownout. Unable to help the Simpsons, Monroe refunds double what the Simpsons paid, and the Simpsons buy a new TV.

Monroe appears in "Some Enchanted Evening" in which 70% of that episode's original animation had to be redone, although the scenes involving Monroe were mostly untouched, said co-director David Silverman. The script of "Some Enchanted Evening" describes Monroe as "a heavy, chain-smoking, compulsive eater." The original idea behind the character, said Matt Groening, was that he was born Marilyn Monroe and was "very caught up over that", which is why he became a therapist. Monroe's voice is based on psychiatrist David Viscott's. Among Monroe's works is Dr. Marvin Monroe's Guide to Etiquette, which Bart receives as a birthday gift in "Radio Bart".

Since the seventh season, the character Monroe has been retired, as voicing the character strained Shearer's throat. The character's retirement was marked by the broadcast of a Dr. Marvin Monroe Memorial Hospital over Lou's walkie-talkie in "Who Shot Mr. Burns? (Part Two)". Since then, several references to Monroe being dead have been made: a glimpse of his gravestone in "Alone Again, Natura-Diddily", a Dr. Marvin Monroe Memorial Gymnasium seen in "Bye Bye Nerdie", and a trivia interstitial in the "138th Episode Spectacular" regarding which popular characters had recently died. However, Monroe is seen alive in the fifteenth season in "Diatribe of a Mad Housewife" purchasing a copy of Marge's novel, The Harpooned Heart, stating simply that he had "...been very sick" when asked about his long absence by Marge. He is later seen "stuck in limbo" but seemingly lacking full ghost abilities in "Treehouse of Horror XXV", and again in "Flanders' Ladder" as part of a dream Lisa conjures for Bart.

=== Manjula Nahasapeemapetilon ===
Manjula Nahasapeemapetilon (voiced by Jan Hooks from season 9–14, Tress MacNeille in "Much Apu About Nothing" and season 13–27, Janina Gavankar since season 38) is married to Apu Nahasapeemapetilon and the mother of their octuplets. She first appeared as a little girl in Apu's flashback in the seventh season episode "Much Apu About Nothing", in which Apu tells her that he is sorry that their arranged marriage will not happen, before getting on a plane departing for the U.S. to pursue the American Dream.

Her first adult appearance is in the ninth season episode "The Two Mrs. Nahasapeemapetilons". She claims Fried Green Tomatoes is her favorite book, movie and food. She has excellent culinary skills, demonstrated by her ability to make a wide variety of dishes using only chickpeas, lentils and sometimes rice. Apu is seen to be very romantically awkward, as well as quite distant from Manjula, and he previously told her that it was customary in America to work long hours, seven days a week, and to never see your wife. In another episode he dons a blonde wig, intending to ditch his family and return to India under the name Steve Barnes.

In "Eight Misbehavin'", Manjula gives birth to octuplets after using a fertility drug. In "The Sweetest Apu", Apu has an affair with the Squishee lady. After Homer discovers this, he and Marge confront Apu, who caves under the guilt and vows to apologize to Manjula, who sets him a number of grueling tasks in penance.

Writer Richard Appel had pitched the idea of Apu marrying years before he wrote "The Two Mrs. Nahasapeemapetilons" for season nine. For that episode, it took several attempts by the character designers to model Manjula because making women look appealing in Matt Groening's drawing style is hard for the animators to do. Writer David Cohen named Manjula after a friend of much of the staff.

Manjula appeared in the season 26 episode "Covercraft", but did not speak.

=== Martha Quimby ===
Martha Quimby (voiced by Maggie Roswell in later appearances, Tress MacNeille in "The Last of the Red Hat Mamas", "Homerazzi" and "E Pluribus Wiggum") is married to the Mayor of Springfield: Joseph Quimby. She wears a pink outfit and a pillbox hat similar to the outfit worn by Jackie Kennedy on the day of the Kennedy assassination. According to Mayor Quimby, the couple met while Martha was working at the "Maison Derrière", a local burlesque house. She first appeared in "Bart Gets Famous", when she walks in on Mayor Quimby in bed with another woman, an event she laughs off when he defends himself with "I didn't do it." She is humiliated when Marge accidentally uncovers her husband's lothario ways in "The Last of the Red Hat Mamas" and kicks Marge and her friends out before they can have tea.

=== Martin Prince ===
Martin Prince Jr. (voiced by Russi Taylor from season 1 to 30, Grey DeLisle since season 31, Jo Ann Harris in "Homer's Night Out", Michael Jackson in "Do the Bartman", Nancy Cartwright in "Principal Charming", "Bart's Dog Gets an F" and "Lisa the Beauty Queen", Pamela Hayden in "Cape Feare" and "Rosebud", Dan Castellaneta in "Lisa's Wedding") is a fourth-grade student at Springfield Elementary School, is Bart Simpson's classmate (and a temporary tutor on "Bart Gets an 'F'"), Lisa Simpson's intellectual rival, and Nelson Muntz's favorite target for bullying. He is academically brilliant, a teacher's pet, and is portrayed as a stereotypical nerd, enthusiastic about topics like science fiction and role-playing games. In line with the stereotype, he also has poor fashion sense and once dressed up as Calliope for Halloween. It is sometimes implied that Martin is gay but closeted.

He is the son of Martin Sr. and Martha. He has an IQ of 216 (which was thought to be Bart's IQ). As the class nerd, he becomes the perfect target for ruthless bullying at Springfield Elementary School. He is a member of the Springfield band, and is often seen with a French horn. Martin's most famous catchphrases are "Behold!" and "Excelsior!" In The Simpsons Movie, Martin gets revenge for all the years of bullying by hitting Jimbo, Dolph, and Kearney with a plank of wood. In "Dial 'N' for Nerder", Bart's prank causes Martin to fall off a cliff, which he survives (although Bart and Lisa think he is dead and try a cover-up). In "Girls Just Shauna Have Fun", it is revealed that he has an older brother in high school.

=== Mary Spuckler ===
Mary WrestleMania Spuckler (voiced by Zooey Deschanel) is one of Cletus and Brandine's many children. She first appeared in "Apocalypse Cow", in which she befriends Bart when he joins the 4-H club. Later in the episode, after Bart frees his cow, Lou, from the slaughterhouse, he brings him to Mary's home, where he discovers that she is Cletus' daughter. However, after Mary agrees to take Lou, much to her and Bart's dismay, Cletus informs Bart that to them, a cow is a token of marriage. After some convincing from Lisa, Bart agrees to go along with the wedding to prevent Lou from being sent back to the slaughterhouse. However, before Bart and Mary can be wed, Marge crashes the wedding, and on her influence, Bart calls it off.

Mary later reappeared in the twenty-fourth season episode "Moonshine River". In it, she is deemed as Bart's last hope in his quest to find true love (in the form of one of his many former dates). When Bart arrives at the Spuckler house, Cletus informs him that she ran away after he scheduled her for marriage again. Her brother, Dubya, tells Bart that Mary ran away to New York City and gives him her address. After Bart and the rest of his family travel to The Big Apple, he eventually finds her at her address, and discovers that she has matured, becoming slightly taller and slimmer, and also learns that she now works as a writer and has a performance option on Saturday Night Live. Mary and several citizens of New York sing a song for Bart, and the two realize that they truly love one another.

Before they can kiss, Cletus arrives, having somehow found out where Mary is, and asks her to return home. Mary accepts, but while at the train station, she and Bart take advantage of Cletus's distraction to flee to another departing train. Mary tells Bart that there will be more Mary Spucklers out there, and gives him their first kiss before she leaves. The family and Cletus arrive, with Cletus demanding where Mary is heading for, but Bart, not wanting to ruin his last chance at true love, refuses, and Cletus then accepts the fact that he must let his daughter go. Mary reappeared again in the season, in the episode "Love is a Many-Splintered Thing".

=== Maude Flanders ===
Maude Flanders, (voiced by Maggie Roswell, Pamela Hayden in "A Star Is Burns", understudied by Marcia Mitzman Gaven between 1999 and 2000) is the first wife of Ned Flanders, and the mother of Rod and Todd. While she was not employed outside the home, Maude was a busy homemaker and advocate for children, whose innocence was often sullied by cartoon violence, liberal education, and the insidious influences of popular culture. Although she spent much of her free time in prayer, reading the Bible, and helping out her husband at the Leftorium, she let her hair down for the occasional dinner parties at the home of her neighbors, the Simpsons. Homer often made statements insinuating his attraction to Maude. In the season 2 episode "The War of the Simpsons", Homer ogled Maude's cleavage at a dinner party, which resulted in him and Marge going to marriage camp.

In the season 11 episode "Alone Again, Natura-Diddily", Maude was killed by a T-shirt cannon at the Springfield Speedway when Homer ducked at the last second to pick up a bobby pin on the ground. She was knocked off the grandstand and her timely rescue was delayed because Homer had parked in the ambulance zone. Ned was devastated by her death. One of the most controversial moments in the show among fans, this kill-off was met with strong criticism but was decided by the show's producers to open new story lines for the series. The character was voiced by Marcia Mitzman Gaven at that time.

Roswell returned to The Simpsons in 2002 after reaching a deal with producers to allow her to record her lines from her home in Denver. Since returning, she has voiced Maude in flashbacks and as a ghost.

Maude's ghost appears in the opening sequence for "Treehouse of Horror XIII", and during the credits of "Bart Has Two Mommies" she is seen in heaven with Bob Hope and God. She appears through flashbacks in "Dangerous Curves", "Take My Life, Please", "Postcards from the Wedge" and "Fland Canyon". She had a small role in "Treehouse of Horror XXII", and she appeared as a ghost in the couch gag for 23rd-season episode "Them, Robot". Maude once again appears in Bart's dream-state in "Flanders' Ladder" where she plays a more pivotal role, and is almost successful in her desire for revenge against Homer. She also appears in season 31's "Todd, Todd, Why Hast Thou Forsaken Me?", as well as in season 32's "Manger Things".

=== Mayor Quimby's bodyguards ===
Mayor Quimby's Bodyguards (both voiced by Dan Castellaneta) are two unnamed large and expressionless men in dark suits and sunglasses. They are usually seen flanking the mayor at town meetings, but sometimes they appear as members of a crowd. On one occasion they neglected their duties while admiring passing clouds, oblivious to Quimby being in danger. This resulted in their being temporarily replaced by Homer. When Cookie Kwan presented a baby that she claimed was Quimby's, the mayor passed it off to one of the bodyguards and told him to raise the child as his own. The bodyguard put sunglasses on the baby.

=== Ms. Albright ===
Ms. Albright (voiced by Tress MacNeille) is the First Church of Springfield Sunday school teacher, who is constantly forced to deal with the children's questions about the more difficult to explain aspects of religion, leading her to yell "Is a little blind faith too little to ask?". She first appeared in "The Telltale Head". She speaks with a harsh Southern accent. She appears to be good friends with Helen Lovejoy and is occasionally seen in the background of various episodes as well as in church scenes (such as in the episode titled "The Father, the Son, and the Holy Guest Star").

=== Miss Springfield ===
Miss Springfield (voiced by Nancy Cartwright in "Whacking Day" and "You Kent Always Say What You Want", Tress MacNeille in later appearances) is a beauty pageant winner, who first appears in "Whacking Day". She is the lover of Mayor Quimby, and is seen several times in bed with him. She only appears with the sash and the crown of Miss Springfield. She has a distinctive, high-pitched voice, which Quimby had originally not heard due to nearby air traffic drowning her out during their romantic encounters, and regrets naming an opera house after her once he hears it.

In "Mayored to the Mob", she is one of two women escorting Mayor Quimby to a convention. Since then, she is often seen escorting him to Springfield events such as conventions, recitals and plays. In one episode, it is revealed she is illiterate. Quimby scolds her for lying about her graduating from "typing school". She then admits she has trouble with the space bar. In "Smoke on the Daughter", she appears (and claims to be) pregnant, and Quimby believes he may be the father.

=== Mona Simpson ===
Mona Penelope Simpson (née Olsen, voiced most prominently by Glenn Close, but also Maggie Roswell, Tress MacNeille and Pamela Hayden) was the estranged wife of Abe Simpson, the mother of Homer Simpson, and the mother-in-law of Marge Simpson. The character is purportedly named after the novelist of the same name, as her ex-husband, Richard Appel, was one of the show's writers.

The character appeared briefly in flashbacks in the early seasons of the show and was absent from Homer's life but no reason was given. The season seven episode "Mother Simpson" was the first to focus on the character. It was established that Homer believed that his mother was dead, a lie his father, Abe, told him when in reality she was on the run from the law after she sabotaged Mr. Burns's biological warfare laboratory, living under the name "Anita Bonghit". She also had a large role in "My Mother the Carjacker". The character appeared again in season 19's "Mona Leaves-a", and dies during the episode. An Inception-inspired dream version of her appears in season 23's "How I Wet Your Mother". In the episode "Let's Go Fly a Coot", a flashback reveals she met Abe when she was a waitress in a cantina and he broke the sound barrier to impress her.

In an alternative retconned story introduced in "Mothers and Other Strangers", Homer discovered Mona's whereabouts in Utah when he was a teenager and went with Grampa to track her down, while unknowingly being tailed by FBI agents. The agents pursued Homer, Grampa and Mona to a canyon where Grampa got stuck in a small gap. Forced to choose between both his parents, Homer went back to save Grampa, while Mona managed to flee on a bus to San Francisco. In the present, Grampa and Homer lament to a therapist how they were never able to find Mona again, but Homer does reveal to his family that Mona secretly visited him in the hospital when Bart was born, disguising herself as a doctor.

Glenn Close has been well received as the voice of Mona. IGN ranked Close as the 25th-best guest star in the show's history for her first two performances as Mona. In 2007, Entertainment Weekly called Close one of "fourteen guest stars whose standout performances on TV make us wish they'd turn up in a Simpsons Movie 2". In 2008, Entertainment Weekly also named Close one of the 16 best Simpsons guest stars. The Phoenix.com placed Close in the second position on their list of the best 20 Simpsons guest stars. Star News Online listed Close as one of the four hundred reasons why they love The Simpsons. Close appeared on AOL's list of their favorite 25 Simpsons guest stars. Robert Canning of IGN wrote that Close "gave us the sweet voice of Mona Simpson. She's a perfect fit, able to convey a loving, motherly tone, while still convincing the audience she's a headstrong hippie activist."

=== Mr. Costington ===
Mr. Bruce Costington (voiced by Hank Azaria) is the president of Costington's Department Store. He first appeared as "Chairman" in the season nine episode "Trash of the Titans", in which he invented "Love Day", and later in "Homer vs. Dignity". He is one of very few characters on the show who has eyebrows. Costington's catchphrase is "You're fiiired!", delivered while shaking his jowls. In "The Boys of Bummer", he hires Homer with a jowl-shaking "You're hiiired!" Homer has worked for him on three occasions: as a Thanksgiving Day Parade Santa Claus, mattress salesman and model for top-brand jeans. He also employs the Yes Guy, who is seen working at the store in most of his appearances. Although he is usually generous, he can sometimes be insensitive. He has admitted to having a shoe-sniffing problem, and is still banned from the shoe department in his own store.

=== Mr. Teeny ===
Louis "Mr. Teeny" Toot, also known as Joseph Teeny (vocal effects provided by Dan Castellaneta in most appearances, Frank Welker in "Dog of Death"), is Krusty's trained chimpanzee who frequently appears on the show. He first appeared in "Itchy & Scratchy & Marge". Like Krusty, he is a heavy smoker, and often seems depressed off-stage. Mr. Teeny is sometimes seen as Krusty's chauffeur and butler. Teeny's uncle was former head monkey at the ministry of tourism in Brazil. As of "Wedding for Disaster", there have been seven Mr. Teenys.

In "Fraudcast News", he missed the third Mr. Teeny and the fourth could not hold a candle to him, although he admits the second Mr Teeny "...you were OK, you got me broads".

In the episode "Day of the Jackanapes", Mr. Teeny saves Krusty from a bomb that Sideshow Bob has attached to Bart. His mother's name is Toot-Toot and she refers to him as Louis when they are reunited in "Bart Has Two Mommies". Teeny also was a writer for the "Good Guy Awards" and quit after being insulted on-stage by Krusty. He is an immigrant from Brazil and has been deported but was returned. Mr. Teeny wears a pink hat and bow tie but has also been seen in a tuxedo and golden encrusted thong. Krusty has implied that if he can not find a human willing to donate a lung when he gets cancer, he is planning on harvesting one from Mr. Teeny.

=== Mrs. Glick ===
Alice Glick (voiced by Cloris Leachman in "Three Men and a Comic Book", Nancy Cartwright in "Whacking Day", Tress MacNeille in later appearances) is an elderly recluse for whom Bart did chores in "Three Men and a Comic Book"; he did not get paid very well, so he started to hate her. Alice had a brother named Asa, mentioned in the same episode, who died during World War I where he was killed by his own grenade, which he held for too long while naming off the men in his company (His last words were, "This one's for you, Kaiser Bill. Special delivery from Uncle Sam and all the boys in 'D' Company: Johnny, Harrison, Brooklyn Bob and Reggie. Yeah, even Reggie! He ain't so stuck up once you get to kno--"). Doctor Hibbert once confessed to leaving his car keys inside her. Alice is occasionally seen in the background of various episodes, often with a toothless laugh. She is a stereotypical lonely old woman, who spends her days "watching her stories".

Alice later dies from a heart attack caused by Bart and Martin's robotic seal on the episode "Replaceable You". Her final scene is dancing with Jesus in Heaven.

In "Sashes to Sashes", Alice leaves her estate to Springfield Elementary School to fund their music program.

=== Mrs. Muntz ===
Mrs. Muntz (voiced by Tress MacNeille) is Nelson's mother. Nelson receives his trademark laugh from her. Early on in the series, Nelson would mention his parents and it became apparent that Mrs. Muntz does not care much about her son. In "A Milhouse Divided", Nelson tells Milhouse that his mom is addicted to cough drops, which is why his father left the family. Mrs. Muntz works at Hooters in "Bart Star", but was fired in a later episode for gaining weight. She owns a dilapidated house and is depicted as a jailbird, a prostitute, a stripper, et al.

In "'Tis the Fifteenth Season", she appears, telling Nelson that his father simply did not like him, and he left with her golden tooth. Nelson's mother was fully introduced in "Sleeping with the Enemy", after years of being mentioned. A loud, high-pitched contemptuous woman, she neglects her son. She implies she misses Nelson's father (who, depending on episode, is either divorced from Nelson's mom, went insane and never came home, or was forced to work as a sideshow freak after suffering a peanut allergy). At the end of the episode, Nelson and his parents reunite, and she gets a job as Lady Macbeth with "the third director she slept with". Since then, she is often seen around in Springfield. Curiously, in Season 18's "The Haw-Hawed Couple", she appears with brown hair. As revealed in "Dial 'N' for Nerder", Nelson refers to her as Mrs. Muntz. She has a brief appearance in The Simpsons Movie, at the end of the sequence where Bart skateboards to the Krustyburger in the nude, laughing along with Nelson at Bart who is tied to a post.

=== Mrs. Risotto ===
Mrs. "Mama" Risotto (voiced by Tress MacNeille) is the mother of Luigi Risotto and an expert chef.

== N ==
=== Dr. Nick ===
Nicholas Riviera, M.D. (voiced by Hank Azaria from season 2 to season 29 and "Bart's Birthday", Eric Lopez from season 38), usually referred to as Dr. Nick, is an inept physician. He frequently appears on infomercials, pitching all sorts of bizarre medical offers or endorsing dubious devices and products such as Sun and Run (laxative sunscreen), and often turns his operations into TV spectacles. Riviera is also shown as an inventor/huckster on the television show I Can't Believe They Invented It! Upon entering a scene, his catchphrase is "Hi everybody!", with the characters present responding "Hi Dr. Nick!".

The design of Dr. Nick is modeled physically on Gábor Csupó, the co-founder of Klasky Csupo animation studios (which animated the series for its first three seasons and The Tracey Ullman Show shorts). The animators mistakenly believed that Hank Azaria was impersonating Csupó, when in fact he was doing an impression of Ricky Ricardo from the TV series I Love Lucy. He is named after George C. Nichopoulos, a former physician best known for overprescribing prescription drugs to Elvis Presley and contributing to his death from cardiac arrest in 1977. IGN placed Dr. Nick 23rd on their list of the "Top 25 Simpsons Peripheral Characters". The character was listed in Entertainment Weekly's "30 Great TV Doctors and Nurses" and in Philadelphia Magazine's "10 Best Doctors on Television". In a tongue-in-cheek analysis, the Canadian Medical Association Journal (CMAJ) compared the services of Riviera and Dr. Hibbert. It concluded that Riviera was a better role model for physicians.

=== Nahasapeemapetilon octuplets ===
The Nahasapeemapetilon octuplets are the children of Apu and Manjula, four boys and four girls. Introduced in the episode "Eight Misbehavin'", they are the result of Manjula being slipped fertility drugs not only by her husband, but by most of the Simpson family as well as part of trying to help Apu and Manjula conceive after weeks of failure.

The four daughters are:

- Poonam (voiced by Pamela Hayden) – The daughter of Apu and Manjula who has fluffy hair.
- Sashi (voiced by Tress MacNeille) – The daughter of Apu and Manjula who has slanted eyes, a paintbrush tip-shaped ponytail, and a widow's peak.
- Pria (voiced by Nancy Cartwright) – The daughter of Apu and Manjula whose ponytail is in the shape of a palm tree top.
- Uma (voiced by Pamela Hayden) – The daughter of Apu and Manjula who has short curly hair.

The four sons are:

- Anoop (voiced by Tress MacNeille) – The son of Apu and Manjula who has an overbite, a pointed lock over his forehead, and a small tuft of hair on the back of his head.
- Sandeep (voiced by Nancy Cartwright) – The son of Apu and Manjula who has curly hair.
- Nabendu (voiced by Pamela Hayden) – The son of Apu and Manjula who has shaggy hair and had eyes that were always shut until episode 13.
- Gheet (voiced by Tress MacNeille) – The son of Apu and Manjula who has smooth hair and an overbite. He is the favorite of Manjula

== O ==
=== Old Jewish Man ===
The Old Jewish Man, or Crazy Old Man (according to "Krusty Gets Kancelled"; voiced by Hank Azaria) is Abraham Simpson and Jasper Beardsley's friend. Mayor Quimby once referred to him as "Old Jewish Man"; also, a list of heart recipients in "Homer's Paternity Coot" listed him as "Old Jewish Man". He speaks with a stereotypical Yiddish accent and curses in Yiddish in one episode. He is apparently friendly with Krusty the Clown and Krusty's father, according to "Simpsons Christmas Stories". He is often seen yelling at people, and as seen in "Attack of the 50-Foot Eyesores", owns a store called Zip Boys, a parody of Pep Boys. He once had a brief period of stardom after his act of dancing on a street corner singing "The Old Gray Mare" with his pants down became a hit on television. In "Natural Born Kissers", it was revealed that he worked as a studio executive during the making of Casablanca and suppressed an alternate ending to the film (and also suppressed an alternate ending to It's A Wonderful Life that would have included a killing spree). He observes that the quality of studio management has changed over the years. In "Love Is a Many Strangled Thing" he dies from overexerting himself while dancing (though this does not stop his ghost from dancing), but in "Replaceable You", he is alive.

=== Opal ===
Opal (voiced by Tress MacNeille from 2006 to 2007, Dawnn Lewis since 2023) is a talk show host. This celebrity is based on Oprah Winfrey and her eponymous television show. She first appears in "Ice Cream of Margie (with the Light Blue Hair)" where her segment on successful women depresses Marge, who feels her life of chores and child-raising has left her without any purpose. She later appeared in the back-to-back nineteenth season episodes "Husbands and Knives" and "Funeral for a Fiend". Marge is a fan and was interviewed by Opal after achieving success through her chain of Shapes gyms for women. She also appeared in the episode "Fan-ily Feud", in which she uses Homer Simpson against her rival, Ashlee Starling. She was voiced by Jade Novah, who also did Starling's voice.

=== Otto Mann ===
Otto Mann (voiced by Harry Shearer) is the school bus driver for Springfield Elementary School. He is notable for his bad driving, which got him temporarily fired on the season three episode "The Otto Show", his drug use (mostly marijuana and psychedelics), his love of heavy metal music, and for calling Bart Simpson "Bart dude". Despite his irresponsible and illicit behavior, he is generally well-intentioned and has a positive relationship with the children at Springfield Elementary. His father is an admiral with the US Navy who does not like that his son wasted his youth and never amounted to anything. He was modelled upon early Simpsons writer Wallace Wolodarsky, who at the time wore long black hair, shorts and a baseball cap.

== P ==
=== Plopper ===
Plopper, also known as Spider-Pig (a play on the popular fictional character Spider-Man) and Harry Plopper (a play on the popular fictional character Harry Potter), is a domestic pig who first appears in The Simpsons Movie. Plopper has since become memetic, gaining popularity in the real world and on the internet, with his theme song "Spider-Pig" peaking at number 23 in the UK Singles Chart. The pig is voiced by Tress MacNeille. Plopper has since made appearances in the episodes and comics, and also appears in the reanimated opening sequence, featuring in the pan across Springfield.

Plopper's first appearance is in the movie, where he stars in a TV ad to promote Krusty's new burger, The Clogger. After the filming is completed, Krusty orders the pig to be killed. Homer becomes upset about this, and immediately adopts him. Homer then spends a lot of time with Plopper and neglects Bart. Later in the movie, Homer is seen making the pig walk on the ceiling while singing "Spider Pig", a parody of the Spider-Man theme song. Homer later calls him Harry Plopper, and the pig is seen with glasses and a lightning bolt-shaped scar, based on the character Harry Potter. Homer then creates a large container in which to put Plopper's "leavings", which he dumps in a lake and pollutes the whole area, leading to the shutdown and near-destruction of Springfield (to which Homer does not want to return).

At one point in the movie, the Simpsons' house is completely destroyed after being sucked into a sinkhole in their backyard. While some viewers assumed that Plopper was killed, during the 2007 San Diego Comic Convention, an official Simpsons Panel revealed that there was a scene at the end of the movie involving the pig that was cut which later appeared on the DVD. This removed sequence is a slightly alternate ending of the movie when the townspeople are rebuilding the Simpsons' house and involves Plopper, a squirrel mutated by the lake's pollution and Santa's Little Helper painting a doghouse. During the following seasons, Plopper makes a few more appearances, including a main role in the 2017 episode "Pork and Burns".

=== Poochie ===
Poochie (voiced by Dan Castellaneta when voiced by Homer Simpson, Alex Rocco when voiced by Roger Meyers Jr. in "The Itchy & Scratchy & Poochie Show") is an anthropomorphic dog that appeared in "The Itchy & Scratchy & Poochie Show". When network executives decided that The Itchy and Scratchy Show needed an update to keep the "interest" of its audience, they devised Poochie, a cartoon dog "with an attitude". After widespread auditions, Homer was chosen to provide Poochie's voice. The character debuted to an unimpressed audience, following a massive publicity campaign; he only served to interfere with the well-oiled machine of hyperviolent slapstick that Itchy and Scratchy had perfected over the years. When dissatisfied viewers flooded the network with letters crying for Poochie's immediate removal, if not death, the executives decided to get rid of the character. Homer begged for another chance, insisting that Poochie would grow on the audience; this argument held little weight until the actress who performed voices for both Itchy and Scratchy declared her support for Poochie as well. However, Homer was shocked when the next cartoon aired: it contained a hastily animated, retroscripted segment stating that Poochie had decided to return to his "home planet", and that he died on the way there.

Poochie has since been seen once at a funeral in an Itchy & Scratchy cartoon featured in "Little Big Mom".

In "Treehouse of Horror IX", he skateboards in the road and gets run over by Scratchy driving a car when he and Itchy are chasing after Bart and Lisa at the time when they were transported into their cartoon. However, he survives, only to have his skateboard fall from the sky and hit him in the head. He continues to be released in Itchy & Scratchy-related merchandise such as T-shirts in "Fat Man and Little Boy".

A matrix Poochie appears in "Kill Gil Vols. 1 & 2" during the Krusty on Ice show, and a Poochie balloon appears in the cartoon in "Funeral for a Fiend".

Poochie reappeared in The Simpsons Game as a boss on the Grand Theft Scratchy level.

=== Princess Kashmir ===
Princess Kashmir (voiced by Maggie Roswell) is the belly dancer who first appears in "Homer's Night Out" (and was the first woman who almost ruined Homer's marriage to Marge as Marge saw Homer dancing with her as a bad example for Bart in how to treat women). She dated Apu in "Lisa's Pony", dated Apu's brother Sanjay on a few occasions, is seen dancing with Otto in the episode "Flaming Moe's", and with Chief Wiggum in the episode "Homer vs. the Eighteenth Amendment" (which also shocked and offended the women in town, much like what happened with Homer).

She has appeared in two couch gags (the one on "Marge vs. The Monorail, in which the Simpsons sit on the couch, followed by three rows of recurring extras and secondary characters, and the Sgt. Pepper album parody on "Bart After Dark" and the original airing of "The Itchy and Scratchy and Poochy Show"), and is seen dancing on the stage in the Maison Derrière in the episode "Bart After Dark". Her nickname is 'Queen of the Mysterious East'. Her real name is Shauna Tifton, and also goes by April Flowers when performing in strip clubs. According to the DVD commentary for the season eight episode "Bart After Dark", Princess Kashmir was originally going to be an actual bachelor party stripper on her premiere episode, but the FOX censors at the time objected (though they had no problem letting Princess Kashmir tell Bart that she works under the name "April Flowers" when she performs at strip clubs). She was also seen in The Simpsons Movie during a crowd scene.

=== Principal Dondelinger ===
Harlan Dondelinger (voiced by Harry Shearer) was Springfield High School's principal, first seen in the episode "The Way We Was", a flashback to Homer and Marge's senior year in high school. He later appeared in the episode "The Front" at Homer and Marge's high school reunion and teaches night classes to ease the pain of his wife's recent death. He appeared in "Half-Decent Proposal" when Artie Ziff, Marge's high school prom date, recreated their prom. Dondelinger made his most recent appearance in the twentieth season episode "Take My Life, Please", in which it is revealed that he rigged the high school senior class presidential election against Homer, after hearing that the students were going to vote for Homer as a joke. Upon finding out, Homer was angry with Dondelinger, who claimed that he had only done it to spare Homer's feelings. Homer's anger escalated when a mystic saucier at Luigi's restaurant shows him that Homer would have had a more successful life had he become Class President.

== R ==
=== Rabbi Hyman Krustofsky ===
Hyman Krustofsky (voiced by Jackie Mason, understudied by Dan Castellaneta) was a rabbi and the father of Krusty the Clown. Rabbi Krustofsky first appeared in the third season episode "Like Father, Like Clown".

In "Like Father, Like Clown", Rabbi Krustofsky had been estranged from his son for 25 years, having kicked Krusty out when the young man chose to become a clown rather than follow the family tradition of becoming a rabbi. Years later, after much exchanging of Talmud passages with Bart, a quote Bart provides from Sammy Davis Jr. admiring the Jews finally convinced Rabbi Krustofsky to accept his son for his career in entertainment. He and Krusty reunited on air during Krusty's show. The episode "Like Father Like Clown" is a parody of the film The Jazz Singer. The parody was writer Jay Kogen's idea. He thought it would be a funny parallel—and a chance to do a lot of easy jokes—if it were a clown instead of a singer who gets rejected by his father. The character's casting was fitting in that the real-life Mason, like Krusty, also came from a family of rabbis but instead became a comedian.

Rabbi Krustofsky later conducted Krusty's Bar Mitzvah in "Today I Am a Clown", admitting that he had not previously, out of fear that the young Krusty would just make fun of the whole thing. In "Clown in the Dumps", Krusty comes to him for advice, and he dies when telling Krusty that his jokes were "Eh".

Jackie Mason won a Primetime Emmy Award for Outstanding Voice-Over Performance for his performance as Krustofsky in "Like Father, Like Clown" in 1992. The Phoenix named Mason one of the show's 20 best guest stars.

=== Radioactive Man ===
Radioactive Man
- Cover of Radioactive Man issue No. 1.

Publication information
- Publisher: Bongo Comics
- First appearance: In The Simpsons: "The Telltale Head" (however, a comic book featuring an early prototype of the character appears in "Bart the Genius"); In Bongo Comics: Radioactive Man #1, 1994
- Created by: Matt Groening

In-story information
- Alter ego: Claude Kane III
- Team affiliations: Superior Squad
- Notable aliases: Radio Man, Radiation Man
- Abilities: Superhuman strength, speed, flight, invulnerability, and beams of "clean nuclear heat" he can fire from his eyes

Radioactive Man (voiced by Harry Shearer) is a comic book superhero. The character was heavily featured in the episodes "Three Men and a Comic Book" and "Radioactive Man". Within the Simpsons universe, he was created by Morty Mann. He has been portrayed in many media since his debut in Interesting Stories No. 27. The first issue of Radioactive Man appeared in 1952. He was featured in at least one 1950s era black-and-white serial, sponsored by Laramie Cigarettes. There was also a campy early 1970s television series resembling Batman. This version was played by an actor named Dirk Richter, who was allegedly murdered in a brothel some time after the show ended, a parody of George Reeves and the controversy surrounding his death. In the episode "Radioactive Man", a Hollywood studio attempted to film a Radioactive Man movie in Springfield. The movie starred Rainier Wolfcastle as Radioactive Man. The role of Fallout Boy, Radioactive Man's sidekick, was cast from local children and went to Milhouse Van Houten. The movie was never completed due to budget overruns caused by constant price-gouging by Springfield vendors, and Milhouse snapping from the pressure of the role, and refusing to continue to portray Fallout Boy. A last-ditch attempt at replacing Milhouse with Mickey Rooney fails, and the movie is cancelled.

Outside The Simpsons, the Radioactive Man character also appeared in a real comic book series based on him that was first published by Bongo Comics in 1993. The Bongo comics expanded more on the character, including his powers, giving him several that parodied those of Superman, including super speed, flight, and the power to fire beams of "clean, nuclear heat" from his eyes. In the comics, his regular personality, Claude Kane III, is seen as a useless layabout. Claude's main love interest, journalist Gloria Grand, has little interest in him and dismisses him as a "rich kid". The character has also appeared in issues of Simpsons Comics and Simpsons Super Spectacular, and in the 1992 video game Bartman Meets Radioactive Man.

=== Rainier Wolfcastle ===
Rainier Luftwaffe Wolfcastle (voiced by Harry Shearer) is an action hero star and a close parody of Arnold Schwarzenegger. This basis has been drawn out over the series. Wolfcastle is a native of Austria, as is Schwarzenegger; he got his start as a child acting in national commercials, most notably for the bratwurst company Fritz Schnackenpfefferhausen. Wolfcastle's wife is named Maria, just like the real Schwarzenegger's former wife Maria Shriver, related to the Kennedy family. Maria is a member of the political Quimby dynasty. Like Schwarzenegger, Wolfcastle is an active member of the Republican Party and owns a Hummer. In the episode "The Boy Who Knew Too Much", Bart Simpson tells Wolfcastle that his "last movie really sucked" (along with Chief Wiggum's line of "'Magic Ticket' my ass, McBain!"), alluding to Schwarzenegger's then-recent film Last Action Hero, which had been a disappointment at the box office. Wolfcastle owns a restaurant named Planet Springfield, a parody of Planet Hollywood, which Schwarzenegger co-owned with other celebrities. Wolfcastle has starred in many action movies, most notably the McBain series (a parody of action movies such as Die Hard) and the movie of Radioactive Man, a loose parody of the Batman television series. When clips of the McBain films are played in the order in which they aired, they form a mini-movie with a full storyline. The credits of the mini-movie had captions, "But McBain will be back in You Have The Right To Remain DEAD" parodying the early James Bond movies along with the style of music traditionally used in those films. Wolfcastle's more recent movies have gained less renown, and he is even forced to do comedies. Wolfcastle has made appearances as an Academy Award presenter, a celebrity spokesperson and a celebrity judge. In a recall election of Mayor Quimby, Wolfcastle ran for his seat. He has a daughter named Greta who had a crush on Bart in the episode "The Bart Wants What It Wants".

The writers invented Wolfcastle as the action hero McBain for the episode "Oh Brother, Where Art Thou?" Because they liked the scene involving the character from that episode, they used him again in "The Way We Was", which was recorded and aired before "Oh Brother, Where Art Thou?" The McBain films satirize clichés of action films. The character was originally named McBain, until an actual film called McBain was released in 1991. That film's producers refused to allow the show to use the name, so "Rainier Wolfcastle" became the name of the actor playing the McBain role. Dan Castellaneta, the voice of Homer Simpson, doubles as Wolfcastle when Harry Shearer is absent from table reads.

In The Simpsons Movie, a characterization of Arnold Schwarzenegger is the President of the United States. He is very similar to the design of Wolfcastle but with more wrinkles under his eyes and a different hairstyle.

=== Rayshelle Peyton ===
Rayshelle Peyton (voiced by Kerry Washington) is a fourth-grade teacher at Springfield Elementary School, taking over from the late Edna Krabappel. Ms. Peyton was a teacher in Ghana for two years. She moved to Springfield because her husband, Darryl, got a new job as part of the Springfield Orchestra. Before she became Bart's new teacher, Ms. Peyton saved him from drowning in a swimming pool. This led to some awkwardness between the two of them.

=== Rich Texan ===
The Rich Texan (voiced by Dan Castellaneta), is a stereotypical rich, callous but gregarious businessman and owner of the Springfield Atoms football team and the fictional Simpsons version of the Boston Celtics, which he lost to Mr. Burns in a poker game at Billionaire Camp in the episode "The Burns and the Bees". He is an active member of the Springfield Republican Party and speaks with a heavy Texas drawl. His morality can wildly vary from episode to episode: sometimes selfish and sadistic, and at other times polite and friendly. In the fifth-season episode "$pringfield" (the Rich Texan's debut, though a similar character once appeared in the season two episode "Old Money"), Homer addresses the Rich Texan as Senator, although this was never again referenced. Rich Texan sports a bolo tie and a white cowboy hat. He is also obsessive-compulsive, as revealed in "The Seemingly Never-Ending Story". He claimed in "Marge's Son Poisoning" that he enjoys moonlit walks on the beach; in the same episode he held Homer and Moe at gunpoint while forcing them to walk with him after the duo carried out a deception on him.

He is seen pulling out a pair of revolvers and firing them into the air while yelling "Yee Haw!" whenever he is happy or excited. He was briefly incarcerated due to one of his stray bullets hitting a Texas Ranger. He has a gay grandson, as revealed in "Million Dollar Abie" and a daughter named Paris Texan (who looks and acts like hotel heiress Paris Hilton). In the episode "Havana Wild Weekend" the Rich Texan says New Hampshire is his home state, and in "Revenge Is a Dish Best Served Three Times", he is from Connecticut, despite his brash, stereotypically Southern persona (parodying the fact that although former president George W. Bush is most closely associated with Texas, he was actually born in New Haven, Connecticut). The popular culture perception of Lyndon B. Johnson also contributed to the Rich Texan's characterization.

=== Richard ===
Richard (alternatively voiced by Nancy Cartwright, Jo Ann Harris, Pamela Hayden and Maggie Roswell) is a gray-haired student at Springfield Elementary School and is one of Bart's friends. He is first seen in "Bart the Genius". He is usually seen with his best friend Lewis and has a leather jacket and a shirt with a small diamond embroidered on the center. Richard appears frequently in scenes involving the Springfield children, and in the early seasons was often involved with mischief. In early seasons he and Lewis were commonly seen hanging out with Bart and Milhouse, but in recent years they are mostly seen in the classroom and in crowd scenes. He had a brief speaking part in "The Haw-Hawed Couple", in which he was voiced by Pamela Hayden. His hair color changes from black to gray, to brown, and then to blue throughout the course of the show. However, in Simpsons Comics, his hair always appears gray.

=== Rod Flanders ===
Rodney "Rod" Flanders (voiced by Pamela Hayden in 1989–2025, Chris Edgerly since 2024) is Ned Flanders' ten-year-old son. Rod prays often; first thing in the morning and last thing before bed. He prays for God to watch over him and his younger brother, Todd, as well as for the success of his father's business. He also prays for all of the other children like his neighbor Bart Simpson, who do not pray for themselves. Ned has described Rod's hobbies as including "being quiet during trips, clapping with songs and diabetes". Rod's largest role was in "Bart Has Two Mommies", where he obtains new climbing skills and rescues Bart from a chimpanzee atop a church. This episode also reveals that Rod thinks of Marge as the most fun he has had since his mother died.

In earlier episodes ("When Flanders Failed" and "Dead Putting Society"), Rod is overshadowed by his younger brother, who plays parts in both. In "'Tis the Fifteenth Season", he mentions that he is "jealous of girls 'cause they get to wear dresses", suggesting nascent transvestism. In a "freeze-frame gag" in the episode "Homer Badman", Rod is stated to be the younger Flanders child. In the flash-forward episode "Bart to the Future", Flanders justifies lending Bart money as a gesture of goodwill due to Bart's having apparently not outed Rod and Todd as being gay. In later episodes, Rod seems to have developed a taste for comedy, as he has a habit of watching comedy shows. During the second segment of "Treehouse of Horror XXXIV", he is depicted as a badmouthed prop comedian, and in the next segment, he is in church reading a magazine about Carrot Top.

=== Roger Meyers Jr. ===
Roger Meyers Jr. (voiced by Alex Rocco in 1990 and from 1996 to 1997, Hank Azaria from 1993 to 1994) is the current Chairman of I&S Studios, and is the son of Roger Meyers Sr. He distributes the cartoon, which is frequently criticized by parents because of its violent nature. He is a jaded, short-tempered and selfish businessman who has contempt for the children who comprise his audience.

He is the son of Roger Meyers Sr., the founder of the I&S Studios, and he took over the company after his father's death.

In the episode "The Day the Violence Died", when I&S Studios is bankrupted following their trial against Chester J. Lampwick and Bart and Lisa are too late in providing information that could save the company, he tells them condescendingly "Great, mail it to last week when I might have cared. I've got cartoons to make."

In "The Itchy & Scratchy & Poochie Show", he creates Poochie in an attempt to bring the show's ratings back up. Homer is asked to voice Poochie, and does so. The show's ratings plummet, and Poochie is despised. Poochie is written out in the next episode (after only one appearance), said to have returned to his own planet (and died on the way).

In The Simpsons arcade game mobile, he appears as a boss in the Springfield Mall and uses an axe, a mallet and bombs that look like Itchy and Scratchy.

=== Ruth Powers ===
Ruth Powers (voiced by Pamela Reed in "New Kid on the Block", "Marge on the Lam", "Strong Arms of the Ma" and "The Wayz We Were"; Maggie Roswell in "The Two Mrs. Nahasapeemapetilons" and "When You Dish Upon a Star"; Pamela Hayden in other appearances) is the Simpsons' next-door neighbor, introduced when she moves to their neighborhood in the episode "New Kid on the Block". She is divorced and has a daughter named Laura Powers. According to "New Kid on the Block", Ruth divorced her husband because his career got in the way with his family life, but in "Marge on the Lam", Ruth tells Marge that all her husband ever did was "eat, sleep and drink beer" and never gave her money for child support (which led to Ruth stealing her husband's convertible). She is usually seen as a background character, sometimes in events that occurred even before she moved next door (such as the baby shower for Maggie in "And Maggie Makes Three"). She even continues to be a background character despite her later imprisonment. She nearly always wears a red headscarf. In the episode "The Cartridge Family", she was part of the NRA. David Mirkin said that Pamela Reed always would give great performances and that he does not know why they did not use her more.

The episode "Marge on the Lam" features Ruth and Marge going on the run from the law in a stolen convertible in a light parody of Thelma & Louise. Ruth makes an appearance in the episode "Strong Arms of the Ma", as a huge female bodybuilder, advising Marge (who is taking up weightlifting) to use steroids. It is also revealed in the episode that Ruth Powers went to jail and entered a beauty contest in which she was named "Miss Mexican Mafia". Her daughter Laura has not been seen after "New Kid on the Block". In "'Tis the Fifteenth Season" and "The Wayz We Were" she is shown still living next door to the Simpsons.

== S ==
=== Sam and Larry ===
Sam and Lawrence "Larry" Dalrymple (voiced by Hank Azaria and Harry Shearer, respectively), also known as "Barfly #1" and "Barfly #2", are two regular patrons of Moe's Tavern. Their first appearance is in "Simpsons Roasting on an Open Fire". Virtually nothing is known about them, except that Sam, whose design is based on co-creator Sam Simon, always wears a cap and glasses and Larry has an orange jacket and a balding head and either looks extremely drunk or very depressed. Sam has spoken only a few times throughout the series; on the season three episode "Lisa the Greek", Sam asks Homer what he bet on outcome of the Super Bowl, and in "Radioactive Man" he simultaneously says "That makes sense" to Moe, along with others at the bar, when Moe tells the barflies that the child actor who played Alfalfa that Moe killed was an orphan who was owned by the studio. In "Worst Episode Ever" Sam is shot in the back by Moe, for trying to pay in Sacagawea dollars. Larry also rarely speaks, except simultaneously with Sam, Barney Gumble and Homer Simpson in "Radioactive Man" and in fantasy sequences (in "Marge Be Not Proud", Larry utters a garbled, "Merry Christmas and a Happy New Year" after Bart receives a soiled wig during Bart's image of spending Christmas in juvenile hall and in "Simpson Tide", Larry grumbles, "This stupid machine took my money!" when Apu was thinking of his loved one—in this case, his Kwik-E-Mart cigarette machine that steals money and does not dispense cigarettes).

Larry dies while drinking at the bar in "Cremains of the Day". After his death, it is revealed that he had been smuggling sapphires for Fat Tony. He apparently considered the other regulars at Moe's to be his best friends even though they knew very little about him. It is also revealed that Larry's home address was 652 8th Avenue, enjoyed fishing and Larry told his mother, Iris Dalrymple, about the regulars being his best friends.

=== Sanjay Nahasapeemapetilon ===
Sanjay Nahasapeemapetilon (voiced by Harry Shearer) is Apu Nahasapeemapetilon's younger brother and uncle of Apu's eight children. He has a daughter named Pahusacheta (who performed in a beauty pageant) and a son named Jamshed (who, despite his young age, can wield a shotgun and run The Kwik-E-Mart when Apu is not there to do so). Sanjay has a wife, as he asked Apu to promise not to sleep with her if he dies (Apu's response to this request was a cheery "I promise nothing!"). Sanjay was shown as Apu's business partner at the Kwik-E-Mart in the earlier episodes. "I'm with Cupid" was his final speaking appearance until "Covercraft".

However, he has appeared as a background character in "Moe Letter Blues", "Homer at the Bat" (as pitcher for Fort Springfield) and The Simpsons Movie. Sanjay can also be seen in the season nine episode "Dumbbell Indemnity" on a sign outside "Stu's Disco" that reads, "You Must Be This Swarthy To Enter".

=== Sarah Wiggum ===
Sarah Wiggum (née Kanneke, voiced by Pamela Hayden in most episodes, and Megan Mullally from 2021 onward) is the gentle wife of Chief Wiggum and mother of Ralph Wiggum. She first appeared in the fourth season episode "Duffless". Like Bernice Hibbert and Martha Quimby, she is a background character who appears most frequently in a nonspeaking role. However, in The Simpsons Game she only ever says "Clancy!", whether hit by or in Marge's mob.

In the episode, "A Star Is Born Again", at the Jellyfish Dance, Clancy mentions she was more beautiful at that moment than the day he arrested her, to which she giggles in reply. He then mentions he only planted the crystal meth on her so she would "notice" him so he has an excuse to arrest her and fall in love with her, despite not doing the crystal meth, any drugs, or any crimes in general. Sarah (according to Clancy) is his "home force" and he lovingly calls her "Poppin' Fresh".

In the episode "Grade School Confidential", she immediately dials the authorities to Clancy's command. Ralph apparently gets his appearance from her, as the two look very similar. According to "Eternal Moonshine of the Simpson Mind", Marge does not like Sarah at all and tried to keep her from Homer's cruise party. But in later episodes such as "The Great Wife Hope" and "The Devil Wears Nada", Sarah is seen with Marge in groups with other Springfield moms in outings or charity meetings, apparently making an effort to get to know her better.

In the episode "Uncut Femmes", her only major role to date, she reveals her true self to Marge entirely different than what she was before, including flashbacks of how she and Clancy met, of which the story was heavily retconned from what was said previously. She was a professional criminal tasked with distracting Clancy, then a security guard, in the course of a heist gone wrong. In the present, she and Marge retrieve one of the stolen items from the heist and she eventually reveals her past to Clancy, who is intrigued by her history.

In the episode "Poorhouse Rock" Sarah is seen again in her new retconned voice and personality, but is in the original character design in a guest appearance. In one of the unaired "storylines" leaked in the episode "Lisa the Boy Scout", Clancy confronts Sarah for cheating on him with Eddie the cop, who is revealed to be the actual father of Ralph. In this appearance, she acted like her old self when it comes to her mannerisms.

=== Scott Christian ===
Scott Christian (voiced by Dan Castellaneta) is a newsreader from the early seasons of the show. Christian and Kent Brockman shared the anchor desk equally, but eventually Brockman started to become the more commonly used anchor. In his final appearances, Christian was used mostly when Kent was in the field and an introduction was needed. His final speaking appearance was "The Boy Who Knew Too Much", save for one syllable in "Radioactive Man".

Christian was supposed to be permanent anchor, always filling in for an absent Brockman, but was quickly phased out as the show progressed. He briefly appeared (with red colored hair) with the other Springfield celebrities in the season 18 episode "Homerazzi" and made an appearance in "Guess Who's Coming to Criticize Dinner?".

He reappears, then dies in "Burger Kings".

He was back in "Cremains of the Day".

=== Sea Captain ===
Captain Horatio McCallister (voiced by Hank Azaria), more commonly known as "The Sea Captain", created by Conan O'Brien. His character is based on the stereotype of sailors and pirates, including the stereotypical pirate catchphrase, "Yarr!" He is a member of the Springfield Alcoholics Anonymous and has a peg leg in which he keeps liquor. In "The Bart of War" he uses his wooden leg to have a vicious sword fight with Sideshow Mel's bone. He is commonly referred to simply as "the Sea Captain", though when he took the witness stand in "New Kid on the Block", Lionel Hutz clearly addresses him as "Captain McCallister".

The Sea Captain is always seen holding a corncob pipe and squinting (because he has at least one glass eye, though once he was seen tapping both of his eyes, stating he has two glass eyes). He also has an artificial leg. As an entrepreneur, McCallister is equally incompetent. On several occasions, he acknowledges his incompetence with a depressed: "Yarr, I don't know what I'm doin'." Although he once states under oath (in "New Kid on the Block") that he is not a real sea captain, at various occasions in later episodes he is indeed shown captaining a ship (even though "Bart's Girlfriend" revealed that he "...hate[s] the sea and everything in it" during the part where he watches ships crash). His restaurant, The Frying Dutchman, is a failing business venture that does not generate enough income to support its owner. During the episode "Mr. Plow", the Captain pitches his 90 track sea shanties CD set in a commercial, which aired on public-access television cable TV channel 92. In the episode "Lisa Gets an 'A'", the captain appears as a penniless bum. When seeing Homer and Marge walking Homer's pet lobster at the beach, he approaches them and claims that he runs a "small academy for lobsters". However, when Marge refuses to send the lobster away to "some snobby boarding school", McCallister asks her for spare change instead. It is implied that he may be bisexual; in the episode "A Star Is Born Again", he responds to what he believes as Ned Flanders showing interest in him with, "Are you hitting on me? Because I don't do that.....on land."

His only main roles were in episodes "New Kid on the Block" and in "The Wettest Stories Ever Told". In the former, Homer sues his restaurant, The Frying Dutchman, because they kicked him out at the restaurant's closing time before Homer had eaten all he could eat. In the latter, he cannot bring the Simpsons their food for numerous reasons like the "chef having problems with tonight's special", which was an octopus. He then ignores the family while playing pickup basketball games with the restaurant's staff.

Azaria modeled the voice on Robert Newton, who played pirates in several movies. The writers' "love of sea talk" is what inspired them to invent the Sea Captain.

=== Shauna Chalmers ===
Shauna Chalmers (voiced by Tress MacNeille) is a rebellious, promiscuous teenager who is Superintendent Chalmers' daughter. She is usually portrayed as Jimbo's girlfriend, but in "The D'oh-cial Network", she apparently sent a message to everybody promising to make out with them.

In "Beware My Cheating Bart", she has a relationship with Bart.

In "Girls Just Shauna Have Fun", she and Lisa discover that they have a shared passion of playing instruments.

=== Sherri and Terri ===
Sherri and Terri Mackleberry (both voiced by Russi Taylor from season 1 to 30, Tress MacNeille in "It's a Mad, Mad, Mad, Mad Marge", Grey DeLisle since season 31) are identical twin sisters with long purple hair and pale skin. They perpetually reinforce their identities as twins, with things such as making up their own "twin" language. They are in the same class as Bart at Springfield Elementary School.

Sherri is two seconds older than Terri; they share their birthday with Rod Flanders. The girls dress themselves identically to reinforce their "twin-ness". They are quite rude and snobbish, and never miss an opportunity to berate Bart and make fun of Lisa.

Bart appears to have a crush on one of them, as admitted in "Hungry, Hungry Homer". Sherri referred to Bart as an ugly, smelly dork, but was persuaded by Homer to go on a date with Bart after he told her that she could not do much better. Sherri stated that Terri had a crush on Bart in "Bart Star". Another time, in "Hello Gutter, Hello Fadder", Homer openly addressed Sherri as "the girl Bart has a crush on".In "Lisa's Substitute", they nominate Bart as the class president.

In one episode when it seemed as if Springfield was going to be lost in a nuclear explosion, it was Sherri —rather than Terri— who was picked for survival by Principal Skinner.

In "Homer's Odyssey" it is revealed that their father is Homer's supervisor at the Springfield Nuclear Power Plant. He fires Homer for causing an accident while waving to Bart from a cart during a school tour of the plant. Homer, however, has the last laugh when he is promoted above the twins' father to safety inspector by his boss Mr. Burns. Their mother is shown in "Bart Sells His Soul" and looks just like her daughters.

In "The Way We Weren't", they introduce a cousin who has a crush on Bart. In "The Blue and the Gray", it was revealed that they were actually conjoined triplets, and that the third triplet is seeking revenge. The third triplet is seen by Marge in "The Daughter Also Rises", but they suggest that she may only be hallucinating.

=== Sideshow Mel ===
Melvin Van Horne, better known as Sideshow Mel (voiced by Dan Castellaneta), is Krusty the Clown's sidekick. He replaced Sideshow Bob after Bob was incarcerated for framing Krusty for armed robbery. Mel's hiring was never explicitly shown in the series and his full name was only revealed when he announced himself while trying to solve the mystery of who shot Mr. Burns in the episode "Who Shot Mr. Burns? (Part Two)" and in the episode "All About Lisa" on the portrait of Sideshow Mel in the past. He first appeared in "Itchy & Scratchy & Marge", shortly after Sideshow Bob was sent to prison, filling the exact role that Bob once did. Little is known about Mel. He is a Cornell University graduate, and a former Gulp 'n Blow employee (during the time that Krusty's show was cancelled, and Bart and Lisa set out to create a comeback special). Sideshow Mel is revealed, in the episode entitled "All About Lisa", to have been the winner of the prestigious Springfield Entertainer of the Year award. The intoxication of applause made him reduce himself to ridiculous behavior for laughter, which he compared to doing heroin and checking email. Sideshow Mel uses a slide whistle to communicate on camera, just like Bob. When not in character, Mel speaks in a grandiose English/Received Pronunciation accent (Castellaneta's play on Kelsey Grammer's character, Sideshow Bob) and owns poodles. When Springfield inhabitants form an angry mob, Mel often takes a leading role. Mel wears a bone in his hair that has been used as a weapon. In "22 Short Films About Springfield", Mel reveals that he got the bone stuck in his hair by trying to dig gum out with it. In "Homerazzi" it was revealed that Mel was in a bitter custody battle and that he has a son, who looks just like him except without a bone in his hair. In "I'm with Cupid", he reveals he has a wife named Barbara, who appears in "Realty Bites" where they are bowling in a house that Marge tries to sell to them. She is revealed to be giving birth in the episode "All About Lisa", suggesting that Mel has at least two children. She looks like a European woman, and has light hair. It has been suggested that Mel is very wealthy, able to afford betting thousands of dollars on football regularly.

Sideshow Mel is often subject to abuse by Krusty, just as Sideshow Bob was before him. Such occurrences include 'Krusty's Slide', where he is forced into a mixture of pudding, pickle brine and laundry detergent, a tub of rancid Béarnaise sauce and a tub of refried beans; another unseen one is in "Krusty Gets Kancelled" where he states that Krusty once poured liquid nitrogen down his pants and cracked his buttocks with a hammer. In the episode "Day of the Jackanapes", it is shown that Krusty can remember Sideshow Bob's name, but not Sideshow Mel's.

=== Snake ===
Chester Turley or Albert Knickerbocker Aloysius Snake (voiced by Hank Azaria), better known as Snake or Jailbird, is a recurring character who is Springfield's resident recidivist felon, always getting arrested but rarely staying in jail. He made his debut appearance in "The War of the Simpsons" in which he was not named but wore the prisoner ID 7F20, matching the episode's production code.

His first name was first mentioned by his cellmate Sideshow Bob in the season 3 episode "Black Widower". In the script, the writers had simply mentioned a character named Snake and it had been the directors who had assigned that existing character design to the name. Snake was named the 19th (out of 25) of IGN's Top 25 Simpsons Peripheral Characters.

=== Snowball II ===
Snowball II is the Simpson family's pet cat. The first Snowball II debuted in "Simpsons Roasting on an Open Fire", and died in the episode "I, (Annoyed Grunt)-Bot", where she was later replaced by a cat Lisa named with the same name.

=== Sophie Krustofsky ===
Sophie Krustofsky (voiced by Drew Barrymore in "Insane Clown Poppy", Natasha Lyonne in later appearances) is the illegitimate daughter of Krusty and a Gulf War veteran who debuts in "Insane Clown Poppy" when she meets her father for the first time and though he loses her trust by gambling away her violin, both Krusty and Homer work together to get it back. She makes a minor reappearance in "Marge Gamer". Later she has major appearances in "The Nightmare After Krustmas" where she wants to spend Christmas with her father despite the fact the difference in their religious faiths (as she was raised a Christian unlike Krusty who was Jewish) to where Krusty almost converts to Christianity, and "E My Sports", where she participates in an esports game as a member of Bart's team. In "When Nelson Met Lisa", set in a possible future, she is shown in a relationship with Jimbo, with both ending up getting married.

=== Squeaky-Voiced Teen ===
Squeaky-Voiced Teen (voiced by Dan Castellaneta), a.k.a. Pimple-Faced Teen, real name Andrew Teen, is one of few teenagers on the show and is perpetually trapped in a series of entry-level jobs, usually working at Krusty Burger (as a cashier, a cook, or, in the case of "Lisa vs. Malibu Stacy", a supervisor in charge of training new employees), the grocery store (as a bagboy as seen in "Selma's Choice" and "Simpson Safari"), or at a movie theater (as either a ticket master in "Itchy & Scratchy: The Movie", a concession stand clerk in "E-I-E-I-(Annoyed Grunt)", or an usher in "Jaws Wired Shut"; in the video game The Simpsons: Road Rage he also talks about cleaning out the urinals). The Squeaky Voiced Teen has acne, and his voice is in the process of breaking. While the Squeaky Voiced Teen's personality is seemingly shy and awkward, he does appear to have a notable degree of peer popularity, as he has been shown to score or at least get along with girls on several instances. He is often concerned about others and usually reports them to his boss; however, when he very rarely is the boss himself, he seizes opportunity and becomes stubborn and evil.

Castellaneta lifted his voice for the character from actor Richard Crenna's as Walter Denton in the sitcom Our Miss Brooks. Several different models of Squeaky-Voiced Teen have been used throughout the series, featuring counterparts in Mexico, Australia and England. Steven Dean Moore uses them all as waiters at the ice cream parlor the Simpsons eat at in "It's a Mad, Mad, Mad, Mad Marge". Matt Groening called Squeaky-Voiced Teen his second favorite "unnamed" character after Comic Book Guy, whose name was finally revealed to be "Jeff Albertson" in the episode "Homer and Ned's Hail Mary Pass". He is also seen in the pre-show of The Simpsons Ride as one of the ride operators.

=== Superintendent Chalmers ===
Superintendent Garibaldi "Gary" Chalmers (voiced by Hank Azaria) is the superintendent of Springfield's school district. He first appears in the episode "Whacking Day". Chalmers is strict and humorless, with a short temper and low tolerance for disorder or rule-breaking. He is also the father of Shauna Chalmers.

Whenever Chalmers visits Springfield Elementary, some sort of disaster strikes. He produces extreme anxiety in Principal Skinner, who offers increasingly improbable excuses for the problems. As a running gag, despite his antipathy towards Skinner and his initial skepticism, Chalmers will still wind up accepting Skinner's desperate explanations. Chalmers is known for throwing open the doors to the room and bellowing "Seymour!" or "Skinner!", to which Skinner stammers "S-Superintendent Chalmers!" His catchphrase has caused some paranoia in Skinner (as seen in "Lisa's Date with Density"). On a few occasions, he says Skinner's name this way when absolutely nothing has gone wrong, implying that he either pronounces Skinner's name this way by habit, or does it on purpose to scare him. In "Homer and Lisa Exchange Cross Words", he even pronounces the words "skimmer" and "dinner" in a similar manner to Skinner's name, who mistakes it as Chalmers wanting his attention.

However, Chalmers does on at least two occasions show a fondness for Skinner. In "The Debarted", both Skinner and Chalmers are lost in the foam of a massive explosion resulting from the mixture of Mentos and Diet Coke, he screams Skinner's name and upon not receiving an answer, says it again in a softer manner. Skinner then replies to which Chalmers tells him in a frightened voice, "Don't ever scare me like that again." In "How Munched is That Birdie in the Window?", when Edna uses a pigeon to taunt Skinner about how much better her life is without him, Chalmers shows compassion for Skinner until Edna reveals that she had an affair with Chalmers, leaving Skinner angry and forcing Chalmers to flee. In "Lisa Simpson, This Isn't Your Life", it is revealed that Chalmers has nothing personal against Skinner and that he is aware that the antics within the school are a result of the students' reckless nature and the teachers' indifference, but scolds Skinner because he would have to face the ire of the parents or of the teachers' union otherwise, and because he likes Groundskeeper Willie.

Chalmers' own competence and dedication to his job are questionable. In "Sweet Seymour Skinner's Baadasssss Song" he fires Skinner and hires Ned Flanders as the new principal. Chalmers then turns a blind eye as Springfield Elementary descends into anarchy while Flanders is principal, freely admitting that he had fired Skinner for far less, explaining simply that "Skinner really bugged me." He seems disturbingly unconcerned with the school's decline, stating that American public schools are already on the decline and will most likely end up just like Springfield Elementary (or worse) and tells Bart to sit back and enjoy the ride (though Chalmers does ultimately fire Flanders for mentioning God in a public school). He also promotes people based on personal bias as opposed to actual competence, promoting Principal Holloway, described by Skinner as a "drunk" and by Chalmers as a "pill-popper", to assistant superintendent after getting run over by a tractor driven by Bart and blaming Skinner for letting it happen.

Chalmers' first name is revealed to be Gary in "Yokel Chords" and in "Wild Barts Can't Be Broken" it is revealed that he is a Spanish immigrant named "Señor Chalmers". In the episode "Replaceable You", it is implied that Chalmers wears a toupee (according to Dolph's science project, a toupee detector). In the episode "22 Short Films About Springfield", he mentions he is from Utica, New York, though in "The Old Man and the 'C' Student" he says that he was born in Queens, New York. He has also mentioned that he attended Ball State University in Muncie, Indiana, after which he moved to Intercourse, Pennsylvania. In several episodes, such as "Bart the Fink", Chalmers is seen dating Agnes Skinner (much to Seymour's chagrin), although in other episodes, he mentions he is married. In "Pranksta Rap", he takes a job as a bodyguard for rapper Alcatraaz, but only because his wife is really sick. In "Bart Stops to Smell the Roosevelts", Chalmers mentions that he was once married and is now a widower, implying his wife died from her illness.

"Bart Stops to Smell the Roosevelts" is the first (and so far only) episode in which Superintendent Chalmers is given a protagonist role. In the episode, Chalmers is challenged by Principal Skinner to get Bart interested in learning, and finds it in the form of teaching him about Theodore Roosevelt. After an unauthorized school field trip, Chalmers is fired for letting Nelson fall off a cliff, but is re-hired and given the title of Super-Duper-Intendent. In The Simpsons Movie, in addition to appearances in crowd scenes Superintendent Chalmers is shown in attendance at an Alcoholics Anonymous meeting on Day 97 under the Dome. He is one of those who panics when a book thrown from outside the meeting room smashes through a window and knocks over the Bunn-type coffee maker, apparently destroying the last of AA's coffee supply in Springfield.

In the DVD commentaries to "22 Short Films About Springfield" and "Grade School Confidential", it is noted that Superintendent Chalmers seems to be one of the few "normal" characters on the show and is frequently alone in his awareness of the show's zaniness (much like one-shot character Frank Grimes from "Homer's Enemy").

=== Surly Duff ===
Surly Duff (voiced by Hank Azaria) is a mascot for Duff and one of the seven duffs. He first appears in "Selma's Choice" and has appeared multiple times since.

== T ==
=== Todd Flanders ===
Todd Homer Flanders (voiced by Nancy Cartwright in most episodes, Chris Edgerly in "Mother and Child Reunion") is Ned Flanders' eight-year-old son, who according to the episode "Manger Things" was born six years ago. His middle name is Homer because Homer helped deliver him when Ned could not get there on time. His voice is based on Sherman's from Peabody and Sherman. Todd is the most impressionable member of the Flanders family. When exposed to profanity, he himself starts to curse ("Hell, no" and "I said I don't want any damn vegetables"). When Moe Szyslak loses his temper at Uncle Moe's Family Feedbag, Todd responds with "Ow, my freaking ears!" prompting the Flanders family to leave. Whether due to immaturity or a means to break away from his parents' (his father's especially) relentless sheltering, whenever Todd comes into contact with anything outside his family and their pious ways, such as the time he was tricked into eating a Pixy Stix by Bart Simpson, he turns aggressive. Todd can play the violin quite well, and is a part of the Springfield Elementary School band, though later episodes depict Rod and Todd as attending a Christian school.). "Dead Putting Society" reveals that Todd is good at mini-golf and capable (presumably unlike his brother) of defying his father. However, he is much less willing than Bart.

== U ==
=== Üter Zörker ===
Üter Zörker (German pronunciation: [ˈyːtɐ ˈt͡sœɐ̯kɐ]) (voiced by Russi Taylor and Grey DeLisle) is an overweight German foreign exchange student with a sweet tooth, and strange habits such as offering his already-licked lollipops to others as a sign of friendship, and eating marzipan candies (called Joy Joy) fortified with iodine. He was left behind on the Civil War field trip, according to the season six episode "The PTA Disbands", but was back in school, playing in the band in the season eight episode "Lisa's Date with Density". His subsequent disappearance from the show for a significant period of time has become a running joke. In "Guess Who's Coming to Criticize Dinner?" his biological parents from Germany asked Skinner where their missing son was, and in "24 Minutes" he is seen stuck in a cobweb in the school air vents. It is revealed in the episode "Jazzy and the Pussycats" that he can play the trumpet quite well. He even makes a Charlie and the Chocolate Factory diorama, but eats it before it can be graded in "Lisa's Rival". During the school science fair in the season 23 episode "Replaceable You" Kearney has a human skull on display with a sign on it that reads, "Is This Üter?" In the German dub of the show, he is called Uter (neither of the names exist in German) and is an exchange student from Switzerland.

== W ==
=== The Weasels ===
The Weasels are fraternal twin bullies at Springfield Elementary School and Nelson's henchmen despite being in the second grade with Lisa Simpson. They first appeared in "Bart the General". They are almost identical except for their skin colors (one is white and the other is black) and their outfits. The White Weasel (voiced by Susan Blu in "Bart the General" and Nancy Cartwright in later appearances) wears a red T-shirt, tan shorts, and red shoes and the Black Weasel (voiced by Jo Ann Harris in "Bart the General" and Pamela Hayden in later appearances) wears an orange T-shirt, tan shorts, and orange shoes with tan soles (although in his first appearance, his outfit was a yellow T-shirt, green shorts and yellow shoes with green soles). While only continuing to serve Nelson on very rare instances after much earlier seasons, the Weasels still appear frequently throughout the series, sometimes in scenes involving the other bullies yet primarily as background characters, especially in Lisa's second-grade class. During the episode "The Winter of His Content", it is revealed that the Weasels now attend Shelbyville Elementary School. In following appearances however, they still occasionally appear among the children of Springfield.

=== Wendell Borton ===
Wendell Borton (alternatively voiced by Jo Ann Harris, Pamela Hayden, Nancy Cartwright, Russi Taylor and Grey DeLisle) is a perpetually nauseated and very pale boy with worried eyes and curly hair. He first appears in "Simpsons Roasting on an Open Fire", although his first speaking appearance is in "Homer's Odyssey". He becomes especially sick on field trips, with a tendency to become even paler than usual. He makes frequent appearances at the school nurse's office at Springfield Elementary School. A classmate of Bart Simpson, Wendell is most often seen with classmates Richard, Lewis and Martin. He was the only kid to support Martin Prince, when the latter ran against Bart for class president. He is one of the few characters whose hair is the same color as his skin. In an episode error, he is called Wendell Queasly in "Yellow Subterfuge".

=== The Winfields ===
The Winfields are an elderly couple who live next door to the Simpson family early in the series and often complain about how crude and uncivilized the Simpsons are. Mr. Winfield's (voiced by Dan Castellaneta) first name is unknown and Mrs. Winfield's first name is Sylvia (voiced by Russi Taylor in "Homer's Odyssey", Tracey Ullman in "Bart's Dog Gets an "F"", Maggie Roswell in later appearances). They first appear in the season one episode "Homer's Odyssey". The couple appear in the season two episodes "Simpson and Delilah" and "Bart's Dog Gets an "F"", as well as the season three episode "Separate Vocations". The couple eventually move to Florida in the season four episode "New Kid on the Block" and have not been seen since.

=== Wiseguy ===
Raphael (voiced by Hank Azaria, Dan Castellaneta in "500 Keys"), a.k.a. Wiseguy, is the chauffeur hired to take Homer to the prom (despite that Marge was going with Artie Ziff) in the second season in "The Way We Was", but he has held numerous other jobs in the series. Simpsons sound editor Bob Beecher commented on alt.tv.simpsons that, "He doesn't have one name. His character's name always fits the scene so he's gone by many names, 'Clerk', 'Shopkeeper', etc. But in the script the direction given to the voice is 'Wiseguy Voice'. So call him 'Wiseguy' if you want."

Azaria does a Charles Bronson impression for the voice. In "Simpsoncalifragilisticexpiala(Annoyed Grunt)cious", Al Jean and Mike Reiss had Azaria voice a Simpsonized Charles Bronson as a reference to this. Like his profession, the character's hair and facial features varied widely for a number of years, with the voice being the only constant; eventually, he was standardized as a balding, greying man with a moustache. Wiseguy has been dubbed "The Sarcastic Middle-Aged Man" by the show's Internet fans. In "Day of the Jackanapes", Sideshow Bob calls Wiseguy by the name "Raphael".

== Y ==
=== Yes Guy ===
The Frank Nelson Type (voiced by Dan Castellaneta), also known as "The Yes Guy", first appeared in the tenth-season episode "Mayored to the Mob" as the maître d'hôtel at the Springfield Dinner Theater. He is a character known for bellowing "Ye-e-e-s?!" in a falling, then rising intonation, and appears to be highly eccentric in both his speech and appearance. The Yes Guy is a tribute to Frank Nelson, a supporting actor in The Jack Benny Program, I Love Lucy and Sanford and Son, whose trademark greeting in all his characters was a loud, drawn-out "Ye-e-e-s?!" Nelson was inexplicably found working behind the service counter of whatever shop Benny or Fred Sanford might be patronizing, and his Springfield counterpart is similar.

In the Yes Guy's first appearance, Homer asks why his voice is always stretched, and the Yes Guy replies by saying "I had a stro-o-o-oke". He also appears in "Homer vs. Dignity". He works at Costington's department store, as an executioner at Springfield Penitentiary, and is juror number twelve of the Springfield jury. Homer refers to him as "that jerk that goes 'Ye-e-e-es?'". A Brazilian version of him was seen in "Blame It on Lisa", uttering "Si-i-i-m?!" ("Yes" in Portuguese).

In a deleted scene of "The Dad Who Knew Too Little", his surname is revealed to be Pettigrew, but this has not been confirmed in any canonical scene.

== See also ==
- List of The Simpsons characters
- List of The Simpsons guest stars (seasons 1–20)
- List of The Simpsons guest stars (seasons 21–present)

== Bibliography ==
- Groening, Matt (1997). Richmond, Ray; Coffman, Antonia (eds.). The Simpsons: A Complete Guide to Our Favorite Family (1st ed.). New York: HarperPerennial. ISBN 978-0-06-095252-5. LCCN 98141857. OCLC 37796735. OL 433519M.
- Gimple, Scott M. (1999). The Simpsons Forever! A Complete Guide to Our Favorite Family...Continued. HarperCollins. ISBN 0-06-098763-4.
- McCann, Jesse L. (2002). The Simpsons Beyond Forever!: A Complete Guide to Our Favorite Family.
- Turner, Chris (2004). Planet Simpson: How a Cartoon Masterpiece Defined a Generation. Foreword by Douglas Coupland. (1st ed.). Cambridge: Da Capo Press. ISBN 978-0-306-81341-2. OCLC 670978714.
- Reiss, Mike; Klickstein, Mathew (2018). Springfield confidential: jokes, secrets, and outright lies from a lifetime writing for the Simpsons. New York City: Dey Street Books. p. 67. ISBN 978-0062748034.
- Groening, Matt (October 28, 2010). Richmond, Ray; Gimple, Scott M.; McCann, Jessie L.; Seghers, Christine; Bates, James W. (eds.). Simpsons World: The Ultimate Episode Guide: Seasons 1–20 (1st ed.). HarperCollins. ISBN 9780061711282.
- Groening, Matt (October 18, 2004). The Bart Book. HarperCollins. ISBN 978-0007191697.
