= The Strong Arms of the Ma =

- The Simpsons episode
- Episode no.: Season 14; Episode 9
- Directed by: Pete Michels
- Written by: Carolyn Omine
- Production code: EABF04
- Original air date: February 2, 2003

Guest appearance
- Pamela Reed as Ruth Powers

Episode features
- Chalkboard gag: "The school does not need a 'regime change'"
- Couch gag: The couch is a novelty cardboard cut-out with holes in it. The family members go behind the standup and stick their faces through the holes: Lisa becomes the face for Homer, Homer becomes Marge, Maggie becomes Lisa, Bart becomes Maggie and Marge becomes Bart. Instead of the TV, a photographer is standing in front of the Simpsons and takes their picture.
- Commentary: Al Jean; Carolyn Omine; Matt Selman; Kevin Curran; Michael Price; Matt Warburton; Pete Michels

Episode chronology
← Previous "The Dad Who Knew Too Little"	Next → "Pray Anything"
- The Simpsons season 14

"The Strong Arms of the Ma" is the ninth episode of the fourteenth season of the American animated television series The Simpsons. It originally aired on the Fox network in the United States on February 2, 2003. It is the 300th episode to be broadcast; though "Barting Over" is indicated on-screen to be the 300th episode, it is actually the 302nd. In this episode, Marge develops agoraphobia in response to a traumatic mugging and overcomes the fear through exercise and bodybuilding, which leads to her taking anabolic steroids and experiencing a change in personality.

Carolyn Omine wrote the episode, and Pete Michels directed it. Pamela Reed guest starred as recurring character Ruth Powers.

== Plot ==
The Simpson family goes to Rainier Wolfcastle's bankruptcy garage sale. Homer asks Rainier if he has anything that will increase in value when he dies, and is shown an old weight-lifting set, complete with dumbbells and bench press, which he ends up buying. While loading the car with the family's various purchases, Homer fails to leave the room for himself, forcing Marge to drive back home by herself while Homer is carried back by Rainier. On the way home, Marge and the kids discover that Maggie has soiled her diaper. Marge pulls into the Kwik-E-Mart, and changes Maggie in the restroom. As she is leaving the store, a shady character accosts her and threatens her with a gun. Finding only diapers in Marge's purse, he grabs Marge's pearl necklace and runs off. Marge, stunned, walks to her car in a daze and breaks down crying at the wheel in front of her kids.

The next day, they inform the police and Chief Wiggum declares he will investigate immediately. Later, as Marge is about to leave the house, Homer gives her pepper spray and some tips on how to handle an attacker. She pulls up to the Kwik-E-Mart, but she snaps when Ralph greets her. She pepper-sprays him on impulse and, feeling guilty, drives back home where she feels safe. When she reaches home, Bart tells her she is parked over the mailman. Marge cannot bring herself to cross the threshold of her house to help the mailman. Dr. Hibbert diagnoses Marge with agoraphobia. Homer and the kids try their best over the next few days to encourage her to go outside, but to no avail. Eventually, she moves into the basement. There, feeling a bit safer, she prepares breakfast for the family and sets up a bed for herself. One day, when she is alone at home, she eyes Rainier Wolfcastle's weight-lifting set and decides to use it to pass the time. In two weeks, she builds herself up and gets well-defined abdominal muscles, much to Homer's delight. She dashes out to the garden to get some lemons and, realizing that she is not afraid anymore, starts running around town. She runs into her mugger; even though the mugger is not aggressive against Marge, she assaults him and beats him up in revenge. The cops arrive and arrest the crook, and Marge starts exercising even more. One day, as she jogs by an open-air gym at the beach, she runs into Ruth Powers, her old neighbor. Ruth is also very muscular, and tells Marge that she owes it all to anabolic steroids. She talks Marge into using them, and also advises Marge to enter a women's bodybuilding contest. Using the steroids, Marge exercises harder than ever, becoming very muscular and estrogen-depleted, which results in a short temper and violent behavior, including forcing herself sexually on Homer.

That night, the family attends the Iron Maiden Fitness Pageant to see the women's bodybuilding final. Marge wins second place, which irritates her when she overhears her family's unhappy conversation in the audience. Later that night, at Moe's, Marge boasts to all the male attendees about her performance at the competition. Homer then tells her he is proud of her ability to bulk up but not lose her femininity. Marge is angered by that, saying that was the reason she came in second place. She then tells everyone at the bar that she intends to up her usage of drugs, and flies into an uncontrollable rage and trashes the bar. Homer confronts his wife as she prepares to hurl Lenny at him. Terrified, Homer tells Marge that he misses the sweet, feminine woman he married. Marge, horrified with what she has done, apologizes, drops Lenny, and leaves with Homer. In order to cover the costs of repairing his bar, Moe sets fire to it to receive insurance money; however, Carl points out that the place has not been insured yet.

Later, at the Simpson house, Marge burns the weight set in the furnace as the episode ends. Homer asks if Marge is ready for a "real workout" which turns out to be a request to wax the car, after which he gets beaten by Marge until he says that he was just kidding.

== Production ==
In her original pitch for the episode, Carolyn Omine had Homer being the one to get mugged, becoming agoraphobic as a result. Staff writer Al Jean had the idea of Marge becoming a bodybuilder after going through these events, so it was changed from Homer to Marge. Omine was initially concerned that while Homer being mugged is humorous, Marge being mugged is serious, and later acknowledged that it turned into a "rare serious moment that was kinda cool". The episode had many light moments to balance this out. Jean thought that showing Marge threatened and vulnerable was a great emotional moment that had not been done on the show before. He notes that the attacker ripping off her pearl necklace makes her seem "naked" and that it changes her.

Jean noted that when characters go very off model, it can cause issues. He noted that some were thrown off by the Marge-on-steroids look and said Marge probably should not have gotten as muscular as she did. The idea behind the design was that Marge, wanting to never be weak again, ends up overcompensating to become aggressive and overpowering. Omine said that these things, plus her becoming less likable and off-model, was a negative combination.

== Themes ==
"Strong Arms of the Ma" addresses the issue of steroid rage. After becoming addicted to the drug, Marge has a moment of realization, saying "steroids have turned me into everything I hate". While the authors of The Psychology of the Simpsons: D'oh! do not condone the "violent destruction" of Marge in the episode, they reason that both the in-universe characters and the real-world audience attribute Marge's behavior to the drugs and not an "innately mean personality". They argue that Marge was not "herself". Mood changes and aggression are both documented side effects of "prolonged steroid use".

== Cultural references ==
The episode title is a reference to the common phrase "the long arm of the law". The way that Marge defends herself against her mugger is an homage to a scene in the film The Godfather in which Sonny Corleone beats up Carlo Rizzi. In the bar scene where Marge looks upon her destruction, Samuel Barber's Adagio for strings – also used in the film Platoon – plays in the background.

A reference to The Twilight Zone season one episode eight "Time Enough at Last" is seen in the scene where Marge runs over the mailman and he has enough time to read a copy of Twilight Zone magazine but his glasses break. The Twilight Zone theme plays after.

The sequence where Homer loads the car is a direct parody of Tetris, including the "Type A" music from the Game Boy version and the game over music from the Nintendo Entertainment System version.

Marge and the rest of the female bodybuilders depicted are shown with physiques of professional female bodybuilders, even though the Iron Maiden Fitness Pageant is an amateur bodybuilding contest. Their physiques are based on in real life professional female bodybuilders, with bodybuilder #17 resembling Iris Kyle. Much like in real life, steroids are assumed to be necessity for competing in bodybuilding, both amateur and professional. Marge is shown doing a most muscular pose in Moe's.

Homer excitedly howls, hits the dining room table, and kicks his legs like Tex Avery's Slick Wolf (e.g., Red Hot Riding Hood (1943)) when he sees Marge's muscular abs.

== Reception ==
Reviewing this season, DVD Verdict said, "There are some real clinkers this season. Both 'Large Marge' and 'Strong Arms of the Ma' prove that writing good episodes about Marge seems to be out of the question by this point."

Cinema.com describes the premise as "Marge becomes agoraphobic (yes, only for one episode) after being mugged on the street and rather strangely decides that the best thing to do is take up weight lifting. It's just as silly as it sounds. Another dud of an episode."

DVD Talk said, "What's encouraging is that the 300th episode, whether it's 'Barting Over' or 'Strong Arms of the Ma,' is simply a number to the writers and producers of The Simpsons at this point, rather than a finish line. As of this writing, the show is knocking on the doorstep of 500 and doesn't appear to be slowing down at the moment, and it's slight changes in focus for the show's seasons that make it worth appreciating, and this one is no different."
