= Dude, Where's My Ranch? =

- The Simpsons episode
- Episode no.: Season 14; Episode 18
- Directed by: Chris Clements
- Written by: Ian Maxtone-Graham
- Production code: EABF13
- Original air date: April 27, 2003

Guest appearances
- David Byrne as himself; Andy Serkis as Cleanie; Jonathan Taylor Thomas as Luke Stetson

Episode features
- Couch gag: The Simpsons are mimes that sit on an imaginary couch.
- Commentary: Al Jean; Ian Maxtone-Graham; Matt Selman; Brian Kelley; Dan Castellaneta; David Byrne; Mike B. Anderson; Ken Keeler; David Silverman

Episode chronology
| ← Previous "Three Gays of the Condo" | Next → "Old Yeller-Belly" |
- The Simpsons season 14

"Dude, Where's My Ranch?" is the eighteenth episode of the fourteenth season of the American animated television series The Simpsons. It originally aired on the Fox Network in the United States on April 27, 2003. It was written by Ian Maxtone-Graham and was the first episode directed by Chris Clements.

In this episode, the Simpson family visit a dude ranch to escape from an annoying popular song created by Homer and David Byrne. Andy Serkis and Jonathan Taylor Thomas guest starred. Musician David Byrne appeared as himself. The episode received mixed reviews and won an Annie Award for Outstanding Achievement for Music.

== Plot ==
At Christmas time, the Simpsons go caroling around Springfield before the Blue-Haired Lawyer orders them to stop, citing copyright infringement. In response, Homer tries to write his own carol, but is so frustrated by Ned Flanders's attempts to help that he instead writes a novelty pop song titled "Everybody Hates Ned Flanders", which is soon picked up by a visiting David Byrne for professional production and distribution. The song is an instant hit and quickly becomes ubiquitous on the radio, which annoys the Simpsons so much that they decide to get out of town and spend some time at a dude ranch.

At the ranch, Homer and Bart meet a tribe of Native Americans who want a beaver dam removed so they can reclaim their land. The beavers manage to defend the dam from Homer and Bart at first, but they eventually prevail by luring the beavers away from the dam so they can dismantle it. Meanwhile, Lisa begins to bond with a cowhand named Luke Stetson and even develops a crush on him. This causes Lisa to be overcome with jealousy when one day she overhears Luke on the phone, expressing his love to a girl named Clara.

When she rides the trails that evening and suddenly encounters Clara heading to the ranch, Lisa tricks her into going the wrong way so she can have Luke to herself. During a barn dance, however, Lisa finds out that Clara is actually Luke's sister, and so hurriedly enlists Bart to help fix her mistake. They find Clara standing on a rock, trapped by the rushing torrent of water that Homer and Bart left behind when they destroyed the beaver dam. Bart resolves the situation by taunting some beavers into chomping down a nearby tree, which Clara then climbs to safety.

Just before the Simpsons begin making their way back to Springfield, Lisa comes clean to Luke about what happened to Clara, which makes him so disgusted that he no longer wants anything to do with Lisa. As the family approaches Springfield, they turn on the radio and find out that Moe Szyslak has a new novelty song of his own, also produced by David Byrne after Moe hatched a Misery-inspired plot to kidnap him earlier in the episode. Not wanting to go through the same annoyance all over again, they turn the car around and spend another week at the ranch.

== Production ==
Musician David Byrne appeared as himself. Producers sent Byrne the song "Everybody Hates Ned Flanders" to Byrne to ask if he was interested in performing. When he agreed, music editor Chris Ledesma went to New York to record him. In 2013, executive producer Al Jean wrote that the song was one of the writers' ten favorite songs from the series.

== Cultural references ==
The title is a reference to the 2000 movie Dude, Where's My Car?. Maggie dances to the song "Oops!... I Did It Again" by Britney Spears.

== Reception ==
=== Viewing figures ===
The episode was watched by 11.71 million viewers, which was the 34th most-watched show that week.

=== Critical response ===
On November 2, 2004, the episode was released in the United States on a DVD collection titled The Simpsons Christmas 2, along with the season twelve episodes "Homer vs. Dignity" and "Skinner's Sense of Snow" and the season fifteen episode "'Tis the Fifteenth Season", despite Christmas only playing a minor role in the first act and not being brought up again afterward.

Reviewing the DVD, Brian James of PopMatters wrote that "Dude, Where's My Ranch?" displays "the series' nefarious habit of using the first third of the episode as a clearinghouse for disconnected jokes before actually beginning the plot, a blight made that much more glaring here since the only connection to Christmas comes early with the rest not even taking place in winter."

Colin Jacobson of DVD Movie Guide liked Homer's song and the scenes at the ranch but felt the episode is not as good as the series' best episodes.

On Four Finger Discount, Guy Davis and Brendan Dando thought that while the episode was good, the quality compared to earlier seasons was starting to drop. They highlighted the performance by David Byrne but did not recognize that Jonathan Taylor Thomas had guest starred.

Josh Spiegel of The State Press liked the performance by David Byrne and the scene of Maggie dancing. He thought the plot was not original and that "[t]here were laughs to spare, but nothing so gut-busting that would last in my mind for awhile."

=== Awards and nominations ===
At the 31st Annie Awards, composer Alf Clausen, writer Ian Maxtone-Graham, and Ken Keeler won the Annie Award for Outstanding Achievement for Music in an Animated Television/Broadcast Production for this episode. They were also nominated for the Primetime Emmy Award for Outstanding Original Music and Lyrics for their song "Everybody Hates Ned Flanders" at the 55th Primetime Emmy Awards.
