= C.E.D'oh =

- The Simpsons episode
- Episode no.: Season 14; Episode 15
- Directed by: Mike B. Anderson
- Written by: Dana Gould
- Production code: EABF10
- Original air date: March 16, 2003

Episode features
- Couch gag: The Simpsons' rushing to and sitting on the couch is animated in flipbook style, with the pages flipped by real hands.
- Commentary: Al Jean; Ian Maxtone-Graham; Tim Long; John Frink; Kevin Curran; Michael Price; Mike B. Anderson; Steven Dean Moore

Episode chronology
← Previous "Mr. Spritz Goes to Washington"	Next → "'Scuse Me While I Miss the Sky"
- The Simpsons season 14

"C.E.D'oh", or "C.E.(Annoyed Grunt)", is the fifteenth episode of the fourteenth season of the American animated television series The Simpsons. It first aired on the Fox network in the United States on March 16, 2003. The episode was written by Dana Gould and directed by Mike B. Anderson.

In this episode, Homer forcefully takes over the power plant from Mr. Burns after accidentally taking a business class. The episode received mixed reviews.

== Plot ==
A sleepy Marge is too tired on Valentine's Day to have sex with an eager and well-prepared Homer, who dejectedly leaves the house. He sees a billboard for a school offering extension courses. He goes to the school and attempts to take a course on stripping for his wife, which Dr. Hibbert teaches, but is kicked out for hogging the stripping oil. By accident, Homer winds up in a different class that teaches strategies for workplace success.

Inspired by the lessons, he begins to investigate problems at the power plant and propose solutions to Mr. Burns, who rejects them all without reading them. Homer later overhears Burns state that he has made a canary named Canary M. Burns the legal owner of the plant in order to avoid any consequences of wrongdoing. With help from Bart, he devises a plan to overthrow Burns by setting the canary free.

Homer tricks Burns into believing that a team of inspectors is visiting to check conditions at the plant; when Burns is unable to find the canary, he panics and names Homer as the new owner. Homer's first act is to throw Burns from the office balcony, allowing a throng of employees in the parking lot to crowd-surf him into a waiting taxi. Burns and Smithers flee to Marrakesh, Morocco, intent on purchasing a large quantity of opium.

The responsibilities of running the plant soon force Homer to spend most of his time at work instead of with the family, and he becomes miserable after having to lay off employees and listen to business analysts discuss the plant's troubles. Burns visits Homer one night (informing him that Smithers has been sentenced to 80 years in prison for drug possession) and takes him to the cemetery, showing him the graves of people whose relationships with Burns suffered because he worked so much - including his wife. Homer decides to return ownership of the plant to Burns, who drugs him into unconsciousness and begins to wall him up inside one of the cemetery crypts. However, he is so slow and weak at building the wall that Homer easily steps over the few bricks he has laid after waking up. Leaving the plant in Burns' hands, Homer returns home to have a barbecue with his family and enjoy his old life again.

== Production ==
The live-action flipbook couch gag was intended for another episode but it was placed into this one instead. The couch gag director Mike Frank Polcino hired a hand model to play the part of the animator. It was a reference to the way animators flip through recently drawn images to make sure the action flows properly. As the chosen couch gag is often dependent on the length of the episode, this relatively short one was placed into this episode, which is a longer Simpsons episode than the one for which it was originally intended.

The writers said that they did not want to watch characters "walking around" as it was not funny, and instead wanted them to "go from joke to joke". However, they noted that the end of the first act consists of Homer wandering through town seeing things. They justify it by explaining that a "sweet romantic" mood is being built and that a slower pace was needed.

Another suggestion for Dr Hibbert's stripper name that was pitched besides "Malcolm Sex", which is in the episode, was "Crispus Buttocks". In this scene, where Hibbert leads a "Strip For Your Wife" seminar on Valentine's Day, the team included regulars rather than "Simpsonized" extras. This led to random cameos from Cletus and one of the mobsters.

Series director Steven Dean Moore posed for the scene where Snake strangles inmate Terrance, only for Homer to misinterpret it as love.

== Cultural references ==
In the episode, Lenny and Carl fight each other with plutonium rods as lightsabers. They fight over whether the Star Wars films The Phantom Menace or Attack of the Clones "sucked more".

The prank that is pulled in the 1973 film American Graffiti is parodied in the Itchy & Scratchy short "Bleeder of the Pack". At the end of "Bleeder of the Pack", Scratchy is involved in an airplane crash together with Ritchie Valens, Buddy Holly and The Big Bopper, which is a reference to the plane crash that killed all three on February 3, 1959.

The theme park Legoland is referenced when Smithers says Mr. Burns has dumped nuclear waste under it for years. Animator Edwin E. Aguilar, although uncredited, did all the animation for the Legoland sequence.

The scene where Ned Flanders stares at Homer and Marge at night from his bedroom window in the dark with a lit cigar is a parody of the 1954 film Rear Window.

The scene where Mr. Burns attempts to brick Homer up is a satire of the short story "The Cask of Amontillado" by Edgar Allan Poe. According to executive producer Al Jean, series creator Matt Groening pitched the joke where Homer puts a blanket over Mr. Burns after his failed attempt to brick Homer up.

The episode ends with the theme song to the 1969-1972 television series The Courtship of Eddie's Father.

Bart exclaims "Look at me! I'm Tomokazu Ohka of the Montreal Expos!" while playing baseball, to which Milhouse replies "Well, I'm Esteban Yan of the Tampa Bay Devil Rays!", referencing the relative obscurity of the two pitchers and their respective baseball teams.

== Reception ==
=== Viewing figures ===
The episode was watched by 12.96 million viewers, which was the 20th most watched show that week.

=== Critical response ===
Colin Jacobson of DVD Movie Guide was confused why an episode taking place on Valentine's Day aired in March. Although liking the parts with Mr. Burns, he found the episode "not that entertaining."

Jackson Cresswell of Collider thought the episode was the best one of the season. He liked the focus on the characters' interactions instead of having them in "extreme circumstances."

On Four Finger Discount, Guy Davis and Brendan Dando thought the episode was a "mixed bag" with three different plots occurring in sequence.

In 2014, The Simpsons writers picked "Bleeder of the Pack" from this episode as one of their nine favorite "Itchy & Scratchy" episodes of all time.
