= The Dad Who Knew Too Little =

- The Simpsons episode
- Homer is threatened for money by Dexter Colt.
- Episode no.: Season 14; Episode 8
- Directed by: Mark Kirkland
- Written by: Matt Selman
- Production code: EABF03
- Original air date: January 12, 2003

Guest appearance
- Elliott Gould as himself

Episode features
- Couch gag: In a parody of Lunch atop a Skyscraper, the Simpsons are dressed as construction workers of the early 20th century and are sitting on a girder watching television.
- Commentary: Al Jean; Matt Selman; Ian Maxtone-Graham; Carolyn Omine; Matt Warburton; Yeardley Smith; Mark Kirkland; David Silverman "Weird Al" Yankovic

Episode chronology
← Previous "Special Edna"	Next → "The Strong Arms of the Ma"
- The Simpsons season 14

"The Dad Who Knew Too Little" is the eighth episode of the fourteenth season of the American animated television series The Simpsons. It originally aired on the Fox network in the United States on January 12, 2003. It was written by Matt Selman and directed by Mark Kirkland.

In the episode, Homer disappoints Lisa on her birthday when he gives her a thoughtless present. He realizes that he knows little about her and decides to hire private detective Dexter Colt to spy on her.

== Plot ==
To keep her secrets confidential, Lisa wants a Turbo Diary, which electrocutes anyone who tries to read it besides the owner. Homer and Bart go to the mall to get the diary, but Homer gets sidetracked by the loads of free food samples and by the time they get to the toy store, the diaries are sold out. After seeing a personalized animated film Ned made for Rod, Homer does the same for Lisa, but when Lisa watches it, she realizes Homer knows nothing about her, upsetting her.

Feeling sad, Homer gets an idea from Moe to hire Dexter Colt, a private detective, to find out facts about Lisa. Colt spies on her and builds up information for a report, which Homer uses to bond with Lisa by playing songs she likes and going to a protest against animal testing at a research lab. When Homer goes to Colt to thank him, he gives him a bill for $1000 which includes frivolous expenses including steak dinners and silver bullets (Colt having worked on the assumption that Lisa was a werewolf). Homer refuses to pay the bill and runs off to his house as Colt swears revenge.

The next morning, someone has vandalized the research lab and stolen all the animals. Chief Wiggum says that, based on the clues, Lisa is the main suspect. Lisa says she is innocent and Homer realizes that she has been framed by Colt. They escape as fugitives, in disguise. While on the run, Homer confesses about the report and Colt to Lisa, upsetting her once more.

The police track the pair to a motel, but they escape again and find themselves at a circus, where they discover all the stolen animals. Colt shows up and chases Homer into a hall of mirrors. As Colt is about to kill Homer, Lisa catches up. After Homer mentions her strong sense of hearing, Lisa, impressed he actually remembered something about her, blinds Colt with a laser pointer (Bart's gift to her), and Colt is soon arrested. Lisa is exonerated, and the animals are all released back into the wild, until Cletus and his family adopts them.

As the end credits start, Lisa eventually receives a Turbo Diary, which Bart uses to trick Homer into electrocuting himself as part of Bart's dirty prank.

== Production ==
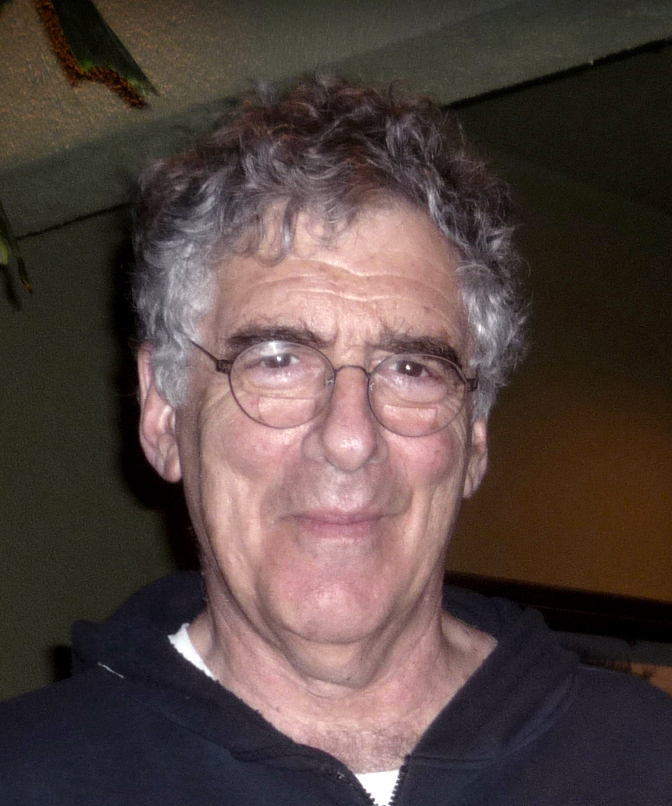
Elliott Gould guest starred in the episode as himself, appearing in a parody of MTV Cribs.

"The Dad Who Knew Too Little" was written by Matt Selman and directed by Mark Kirkland as part of the fourteenth season of The Simpsons (2002–03). American actor Elliott Gould guest starred in the episode as himself, appearing in the television show Padz that Bart and Lisa watch at the beginning of the episode. Padz, which is a parody of the reality show MTV Cribs, takes its viewers inside the luxurious homes of celebrities. The celebrity featured in the episode that Bart and Lisa watch is Krusty the Clown, and he is seen having a fight with his neighbor, Gould, whose son has been bitten by Krusty's tame chimp. Gould had been referenced in a previous episode of The Simpsons, in which it was revealed that he was Marge's hero when she was in high school. According to The Simpsons showrunner Al Jean, Gould wrote a letter to the producers of the show thanking them for the reference. This prompted them to ask him if he wanted to do a guest appearance in the series. When Gould assaults Krusty, he names his fists and feet Bob and Carol and Ted and Alice, a reference to the film of the same name that Gould starred in.

The Simpsons cast member Hank Azaria provided the voice of Dexter Colt, basing it on actor Robert Stack who has played several detectives and agents. Kirkland was enthusiastic about directing the episode as he enjoys film noir detective films and is a big fan of actor Humphrey Bogart, who has appeared in many films of the genre. Kirkland based the design of Colt on Robert Mitchum, who, in addition to being a film noir actor, played a detective in the 1991 film Cape Fear, while playing the villain in the original film. A viewing of detective films from the film noir period was arranged by Kirkland for his animation crew so that they would get inspiration on how to animate the scenes featuring Colt, including how to design the environments and how to make Colt act.

== Release ==
The episode originally aired on the Fox network in the United States on January 12, 2003. It was viewed in approximately 7.6 million households that night. With a Nielsen rating of 7.1, the episode finished 39th in the ratings for the week of January 6–12, 2003 (tied with new episodes of Law & Order: Special Victims Unit and 48 Hours). It was the third highest-rated broadcast on Fox that week, following a National Football League playoffs game and an episode of Joe Millionaire. On December 6, 2011, "The Dad Who Knew Too Little" was released on Blu-ray and DVD as part of the box set The Simpsons – The Complete Fourteenth Season. Staff members Jean, Selman, Kirkland, Ian Maxtone-Graham, Carolyn Omine, Matt Warburton, and David Silverman, as well as cast member Yeardley Smith and former Simpsons guest star "Weird Al" Yankovic, participated in the audio commentary for the episode.

In February 2004, Matt Selman won a Writers Guild of America Award in the "Animation" category for the script to "The Dad Who Knew Too Little" that he wrote. Other nominations in that category included the Simpsons episodes "Moe Baby Blues" and "My Mother the Carjacker", both from 2003, and episodes of Futurama, King of the Hill, and The Adventures of Jimmy Neutron, Boy Genius. "The Dad Who Knew Too Little" received a negative review from critic Colin Jacobson of DVD Movie Guide. He wrote: "How many times will the series go to the 'Homer neglects Lisa and gets in trouble' well? Many, and the result is usually the same: mediocrity and sentimentality. 'Little' proves to be no less predictable than its brethren, though the private detective angle adds some mirth. Still, it's an unexceptional episode that feels like one we've already seen many times."

=== Homer's email ===
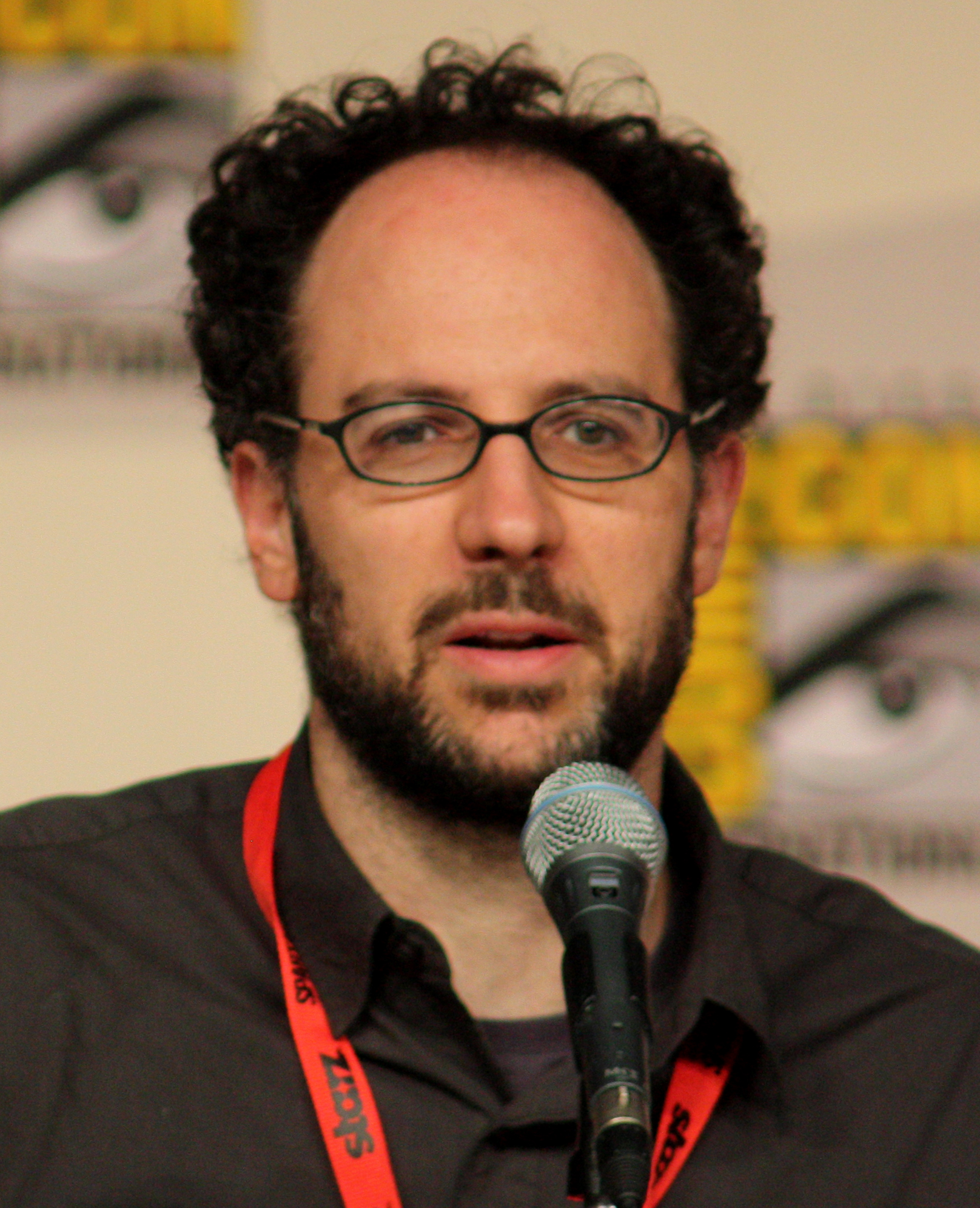
Writer Matt Selman registered Homer's email that is seen in the episode and responded to mails sent by fans.

Homer gives his email, chunkylover53@aol.com, to Dexter Colt in the episode so that they can keep contact. In an article for the technology section of the Time website, Selman wrote that he registered that email before the broadcast of the episode, thinking that "if anyone wanted to write an email to Homer, it would be fun to answer back." Once the episode had aired, he logged in to find that his inbox had reached its maximum 999-message limit. According to Selman, most messages "were of the simple, 'Who is this?' or 'Are U Matt Groening?' or 'LOL Homer Rulzzz LOL!' variety. But many people wrote long, thoughtful, attempting-to-be funny missives to Homer".

Selman responded to many of the messages in the character of Homer. He initially intended to answer them all, but gave up when he received even more messages after deleting some of the answered ones in his inbox. At first, Selman answered the messages individually, trying to come up with clever responses for each one. He then ran out of ideas and his answers started getting less clever, and eventually he would just copy a few responses and use them on all the messages. These responses were, according to Selman, written along the lines of "Dear Nerd, I didn't even know the internet was on computers these days, let alone some kind of electric mail dealie. Please send all future letters (and beer) to: 742 Evergreen Terrace, Springfield USA then a zip code. Praise Jebus! —Homer Simpson." Selman would also occasionally just reply with a simple "d'oh!".

In 2008, Homer's email name "Chunkylover53" drew media attention after it had been used by hackers. Users of AOL Instant Messenger (AIM) who had added an account with the screen name Chunkylover53 to their contact list could see that the account had changed its status message to include a link and the text "click that and click RUN (or RUN from current location) or save to desktop and double click, it's a *new* internet-only exclusive Simpson's episode that is only being released to the internet fans! Enjoy!" The link led to an executable file (.exe) that installed a Trojan on the computers that ran the file. Rootkit software was installed on the infected computers, which were also deposited into a Turkish botnet, according to Christopher Boyd of Actiance's SpywareGuide. Selman has stated that he was not involved with the spreading of the malware, and Boyd wrote that "the AIM screen-name 'Chunkylover53' is not necessarily connected to the 'official' chunkylover53@aol.com email address – anyone could have set up that AIM screen-name, using whatever EMail address they feel like. However, people will naturally add 'Chunkylover53' to their AIM accounts thinking it will be the 'real' Homer."

== Cultural references ==
The title is a reference to the noir film "The Man Who Knew Too Much". It may also be a callback to the episode "The Boy Who Knew Too Much".

The hall of mirrors scene is a reference to "The Lady from Shanghai".

Whilst in disguise, Lisa comments she looks like a Powerpuff Girl and Homer claims he looks like Elvis. Kirkland has said the joke was one of his favorite jokes in the series.
