= 'Scuse Me While I Miss the Sky =

- The Simpsons episode
- Episode no.: Season 14; Episode 16
- Directed by: Steven Dean Moore
- Written by: Dan Greaney; Allen Glazier
- Production code: EABF11
- Original air date: March 30, 2003

Guest appearances
- Eric Idle as Declan Desmond; Joe Mantegna as Fat Tony; Marcia Wallace as Edna Krabappel

Episode features
- Couch gag: The living room is in an ocean. Homer is on water skis, with the others on him, as he ski-jumps over sharks; everybody lands on the couch, but Homer's legs are in the mouth of the shark.
- Commentary: Al Jean; Dan Greaney; Allen Glazier; Carolyn Omine; Kevin Curran; J. Stewart Burns; Joe Mantegna; Steven Dean Moore; David Silverman

Episode chronology
| ← Previous "C.E.D'oh" | Next → "Three Gays of the Condo" |
- The Simpsons season 14

"'Scuse Me While I Miss the Sky" is the sixteenth episode of the fourteenth season of the American animated television series The Simpsons. It originally aired on the Fox network in the United States on March 30, 2003. The episode was written by Dan Greaney and Allen Glazier and was directed by Steven Dean Moore.

In this episode, Lisa tries to reduce the town's light pollution, so she can see the stars at night. Meanwhile Bart tries to steal the hood ornament from Fat Tony's car to regain his reputation after he is humiliated. Eric Idle guest starred as Declan Desmond. The episode received mixed reviews.

== Plot ==
Declan Desmond, an opinionated British documentary film producer, films a documentary at Springfield Elementary School on the students' lives. He interviews Bart as he gets hit by a ball of dirt thrown by Nelson and breaks down in tears. Later, Declan belittles Lisa as she talks about the multiplicity of her interests, insinuating that she could neither be happy nor successful juggling too many hobbies or passions. Hurt by his criticism, Lisa resolves to find a single passion to which she can devote herself; astronomy. She convinces Homer to buy her a telescope, but discovers that light pollution from the city is blocking her view of the sky. After a discussion with Professor Frink, Lisa starts a petition to reduce the city's light pollution. After gaining enough signatures, Mayor Quimby agrees to turn off the streetlights, leading to a clear view of the stars, at which many people from Springfield marvel.

Meanwhile, Bart is looking for a way to regain his popularity after being humiliated. After seeing Nelson parading around with stolen car hood ornaments, he decides to steal one off Fat Tony's car. Milhouse and Bart are caught by Fat Tony and his henchmen, and try to escape on a passing streetcar, only for it to stop in front of Tony and his henchmen, which was the line's terminus. As a result, their first attempt failed because Quimby is pressured to switch the lights back on due to rising crime. Yet the light level is set too high which means that no one can sleep so Lisa, still wanting to see the light pollution reduced, and Bart, still wanting to steal Fat Tony's hood ornament, take a now sleep-deprived Homer to the power plant and overload the generators causing a power outage, which ends the light pollution, but before the angry citizens can attack, Lisa points out a meteor shower and the town looks on in wonderment while Bart sneaks off and steals Fat Tony's hood ornament, with Don McLean's song "Vincent" playing in the background.

The show ends with a montage of clips from Declan's documentary.

== Production ==
By this time in the show's history, there had been an "ever-present fear that as the show ages it risks 'jumping the shark'". The Simpsons writers satirized the term's namesake (an episode of Happy Days in which Fonzie jumps over a shark on water skis) in the episode, which has a couch gag where the Simpson family jump over a tank full of sharks in a similar fashion (the gag had previously been used in the episode "How I Spent My Strummer Vacation"). Executive producer Al Jean said, "We figured that if we said it first, then they couldn't say it".

The writers included a line where Carl Carlson mentions his Icelandic heritage, as well as the fact that Homer, Moe and Lenny show absolutely no interest in what he's saying. This would later become both the basis and an explicit reference point in the episode "The Saga of Carl", where Carl steals the winnings from a lottery ticket he jointly purchased with the gang before returning to Iceland; then when they track him down, he says that he is not sorry for what he did because they are not friends, as "friends care that their friends are from Iceland!"

== Cultural references ==
The episode's title references the lyric "scuse me while I kiss the sky" from Jimi Hendrix's song "Purple Haze".

== Reception ==
=== Viewing figures ===
The episode was watched by 12.56 million viewers, which was the 16th most-watched show that week.

=== Critical response ===
Colin Jacobson of DVD Movie Guide wrote, "[l]ike most Lisa-based stories, this one tends to be lackluster." He enjoyed the subplot involving Bart and Fat Tony.

On Four Finger Discount, Brendan Dando liked both Lisa and Bart's stories while Guy Davis felt the episode was pieced together from many different writers' ideas.

English musician Jake Bugg credits hearing Don McLean's "Vincent" in this episode as his formative musical moment.

=== Awards and nominations ===
Director Steven Dean Moore won the Annie Award for Outstanding Achievement for Directing in an Animated Television/Broadcast Production for this episode. The episode was also nominated for an Environmental Media Award for Best Television Episodic Comedy.
