= The Great Louse Detective =

- The Simpsons episode
- Episode no.: Season 14; Episode 6
- Directed by: Steven Dean Moore
- Written by: John Frink and Don Payne
- Production code: EABF01
- Original air date: December 15, 2002

Guest appearance
- Kelsey Grammer as Sideshow Bob

Episode features
- Couch gag: When Homer uses the remote, the family travels back in time to the prehistoric era and the Roman times.
- Commentary: Matt Groening; Al Jean; John Frink; Ian Maxtone-Graham; Matt Selman; Tim Long; Michael Price; Tom Gammill; Dan Castellaneta; Steven Dean Moore; Mike B. Anderson; David Silverman

Episode chronology
← Previous "Helter Shelter"	Next → "Special Edna"
- The Simpsons season 14

"The Great Louse Detective" is the sixth episode of the fourteenth season of the American animated television series The Simpsons. It originally aired on the Fox network in the United States on December 15, 2002. In the episode, the Simpson family wins a free spa weekend and Homer is nearly killed when a mysterious figure locks him in a sauna. Chief Wiggum decides to hire someone who can think like a murderer in order to find the mystery assailant. Bart's arch-enemy Sideshow Bob is sent to live with the Simpsons so he can help find Homer's attempted killer, who turns out to be the son of the late Frank Grimes.

Since airing, the episode has received generally positive reviews from critics. The episode's title is a reference to the 1986 Disney animated feature The Great Mouse Detective.

== Plot ==
The Simpsons win a free spa weekend. At the spa, Homer is nearly killed when a mysterious person locks him in a sauna with a wrench but is saved inadvertently when Krusty the Clown unlocks the door. Homer and Marge see Chief Wiggum, who suggests they seek help from someone who can understand a murderer's twisted mind – the incarcerated Sideshow Bob. Wiggum places a shock bracelet on Sideshow Bob's ankle to discipline any bad behavior while he stays at the Simpson house. Bob asks Homer to list all the people who may want him dead and follows him around to investigate who the assailant could be. They end up at a repair shop, where Homer rebukes the mechanic, Junior.

Homer and Bob go to Moe's Tavern, where Lenny gives Bob advice on how to murder Bart by coming up behind him with a knife and slitting his throat. While Homer is at the tavern, the assailant shoots at him before escaping in a tow truck. Bob's efforts to keep Homer safe are ruined when Homer is named the King of the Springfield Mardi Gras, evidently a result of the ballot getting rigged in his favor. Bob urges Homer not to take part in the parade, as it would make him an easy target, but Homer does so anyway as he hopes it will lure out his assailant. At the parade, Bob finds out that Homer's float has been sabotaged by a car mechanic, leading him to deduce that Junior is the culprit. Bob's quick thinking manages to save Homer's life just before the float crashes, and they soon find Junior in the crowd when he tries to shoot Homer again.

After being chased into a corner by Homer and Bob, Junior is caught by the police and revealed as Frank Grimes Jr., the illegitimate son of the late Frank Grimes who blames Homer for his father's death. That night, Bob confronts Bart, having taken possession of the remote for his shock bracelet, which he throws out the window. Considering Lenny's earlier advice, Bob decides to kill Bart but realizes that he has grown accustomed to Bart's face and cannot bring himself to do it. He tries to take his leave but gets zapped continuously by his shock bracelet from birds pecking the remote after it landed in their nest.

== Production ==
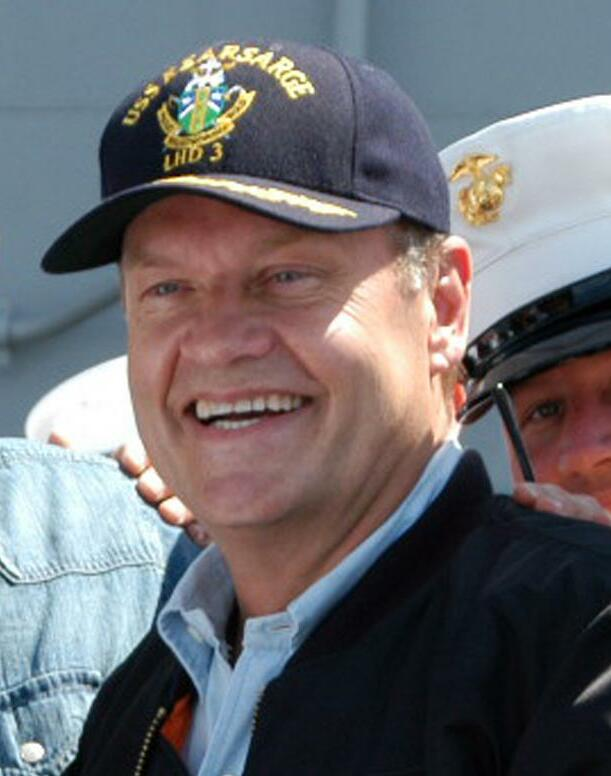
Kelsey Grammer voiced Sideshow Bob in the episode, as he had several times prior to this.

"The Great Louse Detective" was written by John Frink and Don Payne and directed by Steven Dean Moore as part of the fourteenth season of The Simpsons (2002–03). American actor Kelsey Grammer guest starred in the episode, returning to voice the recurring character Sideshow Bob. Since season three's "Black Widower" (1992), the writers have echoed the premise of Wile E. Coyote chasing the Road Runner from the 1949–1966 Looney Tunes cartoons by having Bob unexpectedly insert himself into Bart's life and attempt to kill him. Executive producer Al Jean has compared Bob's character to that of Wile E. Coyote, noting that both are intelligent, yet always foiled by what they perceive as an inferior intellect.

This is one of the first episodes of The Simpsons to be animated with digital ink and paint, and marked the series' permanent switch to that technique, but the opening sequence made in cel animation was not definitively abandoned until seven years later, when the show converted to widescreen high-definition. Previously, episodes had been animated using the traditional ink-and-paint process. Digital ink and paint had previously been used by the animators of The Simpsons for season 7's "Radioactive Man" and "The Simpsons 138th Episode Spectacular", season 12's "Tennis the Menace", and the season 14 opener "Treehouse of Horror XIII" (a season 13 holdover), primarily to test the technique.

== Release ==
The episode originally aired on the Fox network in the United States on December 15, 2002. It was viewed in approximately 8.75 million households that night. With a Nielsen rating of 8.2, the episode finished 23rd in the ratings for the week of December 9–15, 2002. It was the highest-rated broadcast on Fox that week, beating shows such as King of the Hill, Malcolm in the Middle, 24, That '70s Show, and the 2002 Billboard Music Awards. On December 6, 2011, "The Great Louse Detective" was released on Blu-ray and DVD as part of the box set The Simpsons – The Complete Fourteenth Season. Staff members Matt Groening, Al Jean, John Frink, Ian Maxtone-Graham, Matt Selman, Tim Long, Michael Price, Tom Gammill, Steven Dean Moore, Mike B. Anderson, and David Silverman, as well as cast member Dan Castellaneta, participated in the DVD audio commentary for the episode. Deleted scenes from the episode were also included in the box set.

The episode has received generally positive reviews from critics. In 2009, IGN's Robbert Canning listed "The Great Louse Detective" at number seven on his list of the "Top 10 Sideshow Bob Episodes". At that time, ten episodes revolving around the character had aired. Canning wrote that the episode "was a lot of fun as it put Bob in an unexpected situation with the Simpsons, interacting more with Homer than with Bart." He added that the episode "is also memorable for having Homer's attempted murderer turn out to be Frank Grimes Jr., son of Frank 'Grimey' Grimes. This was a nice reference to 'Homer's Enemy' and was a rare instance where the series carried through some continuity."

DVD Movie Guide's Colin Jacobson commented that "Over the years, we’ve gotten many a great Sideshow Bob episode, so this one has to live up to steep competition. While not a bad show, 'Louse' fails to live up to its predecessors. It does throw out some good moments, and it’s fine by Season 14 standards, but it doesn’t qualify as a Sideshow Bob classic."
