= Moe Baby Blues =

- The Simpsons episode
- Episode no.: Season 14; Episode 22
- Directed by: Lauren MacMullan
- Written by: J. Stewart Burns
- Production code: EABF17
- Original air date: May 18, 2003

Guest appearance
- Joe Mantegna as Fat Tony

Episode features
- Couch gag: The living room is made of gingerbread and candy. The Simpsons are gingerbread people who rush to the couch. Homer takes a bite out of Bart's head.
- Commentary: Matt Groening; Al Jean; J. Stewart Burns; Matt Selman; Kevin Curran; Michael Price; Tom Gammill; Max Pross; Dan Castellaneta; Hank Azaria

Episode chronology
← Previous "The Bart of War"	Next → "Treehouse of Horror XIV"
- The Simpsons season 14

"Moe Baby Blues" is the twenty-second and final episode of the fourteenth season of the American television series The Simpsons. It originally aired on the Fox network in the United States on May 18, 2003. In the episode, a suicidal Moe Szyslak miraculously saves Maggie Simpson's life and the two form a strong bond, giving him a renewed sense of purpose.

== Plot ==
The whole town goes to the Springfield Botanical Gardens to see the blooming of a Sumatran Century Flower. Because the huge crowd is exactly one person over the maximum legal capacity, Chief Wiggum decides to eject the most bitter and unpopular person there from the ceremony: Moe. However, when the flower opens, it emits a horrible smell, sickening the townspeople and destroying the entire garden. When the townspeople start to drive away from the Botanical Gardens, the Simpsons become trapped in a traffic jam over a bridge. Lisa tries to warn Homer that the traffic is moving, but he accelerates too hard and isn't able to stop before he collides with another car. No-one is injured in the crash, but the impact force sends Maggie flying through the sunroof after her cheaply-made safety belt breaks. Moe, who is getting ready to leap to his death from the side of the bridge, accidentally catches Maggie just as she is about to fall into the river below. Moe is then declared a hero by witnesses, much to his surprise, and he instantly bonds with Maggie.

The Simpsons allow Moe to babysit Maggie on a regular basis and Marge is happy that she has had plenty of time to get things done, but Homer feels left out of Maggie's life and worries because she is his last chance to be a good father after his complete failures with Lisa and Bart. Later, Moe tells Maggie the story of The Godfather. When he gets to the part where Don Corleone plays with his grandson, Moe demonstrates how the Don scares him by sticking a cut-up orange in his mouth, and Maggie enjoys it. When it comes to Maggie's birthday party, Moe annoys everyone with his behavior and his gift to Maggie: a toy-sized rendition of his bar, featuring "Classic Drunk Barney" and "Drunk Talking Homer". When Marge and Homer learn that Moe has installed his own baby-monitoring system in Maggie's room, they decide enough is enough and evict Moe from their house for good.

Moe reverts to being depressed, to the point of him imagining the barflies as Maggie. One night, the family is asleep, and Maggie wakes up and hears the mafia outside the house, plotting to kill the Castellaneta family. When one of the mobsters feels hesitant, Fat Tony does the Godfather-orange routine to cheer him up, and Maggie recognizes it and decides to follow the mobsters. When Homer and Marge find her missing, they assume that Moe kidnapped her, and they track him down with the aid of the police. They see Moe at his oven, and they think that Maggie is inside, but it turns out to really be a ham. When Moe is told that Maggie is missing, he offers to help the Simpsons find her. Searching the backyard, the group find the cut-up orange that Fat Tony used, and Moe works out that Maggie must have followed the mobsters.

Maggie follows the mobsters to Luigi's, where Fat Tony's gang and the Castellanetas are having a meeting. Maggie enters the restaurant where the two gangs are about to start a gun battle. The situation deteriorates when both groups of mobsters are aiming weapons at each other and Maggie is in the middle of an "Italian-American Mexican standoff". Homer, Marge and Moe are standing outside and Moe decides to go inside and save Maggie. Moe goes inside, and to prevent being shot, tells the gangsters about Maggie's innocence and how it redeemed his life. They start to cry, and Moe and Maggie leave safely. The family apologizes for their injustice against Moe, and Homer and Moe decide to have a "playdate": Homer spends quality time with the ham, and Moe spends more time with Maggie.

== Production ==
"Moe Baby Blues" was written by J. Stewart Burns and directed by Lauren MacMullan as part of the fourteenth season of The Simpsons (2002–2003).

== Reception ==
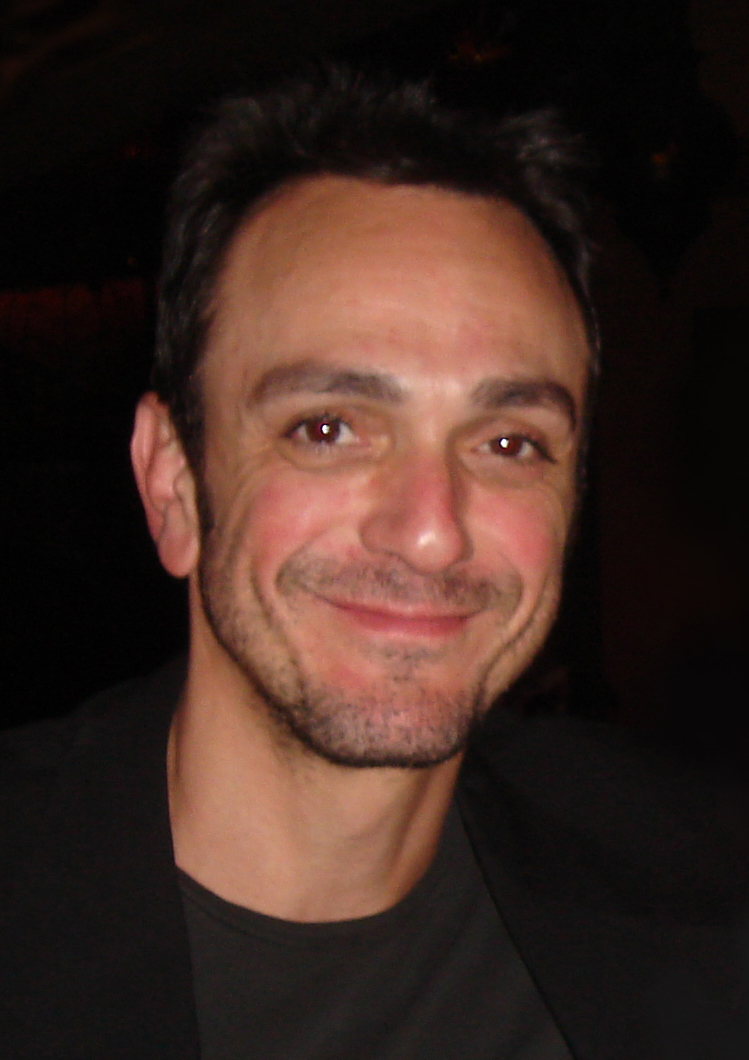
Hank Azaria, who voices Moe and other The Simpsons characters, won an Emmy Award for his work on this episode.

The episode has received positive reviews from critics. The A.V. Club writer Emily VanDerWerff, who holds the opinion that by the start of the 2000s The Simpsons had declined in quality compared to its earlier years, praised "Moe Baby Blues" for being as good as the better episodes of the series.

In 2009 she wrote, "No matter how hard showrunner Al Jean tried to bring the show back to its roots after Mike Scully turned it into a cartoonish fantasy early in the decade, there was always something missing. The series, which had done everything, mostly lost its ability to surprise. Every so often, though, it came up with an episode like this one, offering a funny new way to use the characters." VanDerWerff went on to say that "Moe becomes obsessed with caring for baby Maggie, in ways both hilarious and rooted in the characters we’d grown to know. 'Moe Baby Blues' added a new relationship to the show, and represented one of the few consistently funny episodes this decade."

In February 2012, "Moe Baby Blues" was listed by Matt Zoller Seitz of New York magazine as one of "Nine Latter-Day Simpsons Episodes That Match Up to the Early Classics". DVD Verdict's Victor Valdivia, on the other hand, commented that "even the best episodes [of season fourteen] don't quite rank with the best of the series' classic seasons, but that doesn't mean that they're not worth watching anyways," citing "Moe Baby Blues" as an example and adding that it "gives some much needed humanity to Moe, easily one of the series' most scabrous characters." Screen Rant called it the best episode of the 14th season.

J. Stewart Burns was nominated for a Writers Guild of America Award in the animation category for his work on the episode, but lost to Matt Selman, the writer of the Simpsons episode "The Dad Who Knew Too Little". The Simpsons cast member Hank Azaria won an Emmy Award in the "Outstanding Voice-Over Performance" category for his voice-acting work on "Moe Baby Blues". It was Azaria's third win in that category and his fourth Emmy Award overall.

== Cultural references ==
The episode features many references to The Godfather films. Joe Mantegna, who voices Fat Tony, appeared in The Godfather Part III.
