= Special Edna =

- The Simpsons episode
- Episode no.: Season 14; Episode 7
- Directed by: Bob Anderson
- Written by: Dennis Snee
- Production code: EABF02
- Original air date: January 5, 2003

Guest appearances
- Little Richard as himself; Marcia Wallace as Edna Krabappel

Episode features
- Couch gag: The Simpsons are depicted as frozen food and cooked in a deep-fryer.
- Commentary: Al Jean; Ian Maxtone-Graham; Matt Selman; Tom Gammill; Matt Warburton; Nancy Cartwright; Bob Anderson; Mike B. Anderson; David Silverman

Episode chronology
← Previous "The Great Louse Detective"	Next → "The Dad Who Knew Too Little"
- The Simpsons season 14

"Special Edna" is the seventh episode of the fourteenth season of the American animated television series The Simpsons. It originally aired on the Fox network in the United States on January 5, 2003. The episode was directed by Bob Anderson and written by Dennis Snee.

In the episode, Edna Krabappel begins to lose faith in her relationship with Principal Skinner and becomes depressed. Bart, wanting to raise her spirits, decides to nominate her for the Teacher of the Year Award. Edna and the Simpsons are flown to Orlando, Florida, for the event.

== Plot ==
Edna Krabappel tells her students to write a paper on World War I, due in three weeks. After class, Edna and Principal Skinner's apple picking date is cancelled when Skinner's mother, Agnes, interrupts. Bart continuously gets distracted from writing his paper by pranks and other activities, and at the end of the three weeks, he still has not started the assignment. The day before the date of submission, he asks Grampa for help, relying on his recount of World War I. Edna rejects Bart's paper for using six pages of ads as filler and tells him that he will have to do it correctly after school. As Bart finishes the assignment after school, supervised by Edna herself, he observes Skinner cancel a movie date with Edna when Agnes calls. Bart consoles Edna, and she reluctantly accepts his offer to accompany her to a documentary at the movie theater.

At home, Lisa suggests that Bart nominate Edna for the Teacher of the Year Award. When Edna is informed of her Teacher of the Year nomination, she thanks Bart at the ensuing press conference. Skinner is about to congratulate Edna when Agnes calls again. Bart informs his family that, as nominator, he and his family are going to Orlando, Florida.

At Springfield Elementary, Skinner is despondent at the thought that Edna could leave the school. Groundskeeper Willie lends Skinner his sports car so he can go to Orlando, where he surprises Edna with a kiss under the fireworks display. They are interrupted by Agnes, whom Skinner brought along, much to Edna's ire. During preparation for the awards ceremony, Skinner is shocked when he hears that the winner receives enough money to be able to retire. He requests Bart to help him sabotage Edna's chances of winning, resorting to blackmail after Bart initially refuses. At the ceremony, each finalist must ask their nominating student a question. When Bart is asked what Edna would like to teach the world, he pretends to be illiterate, until Skinner tells the truth. Skinner asks Edna to marry him, and she agrees. Edna loses the award to Julio Estudiante, but looks forward to marrying Skinner.

== Production ==
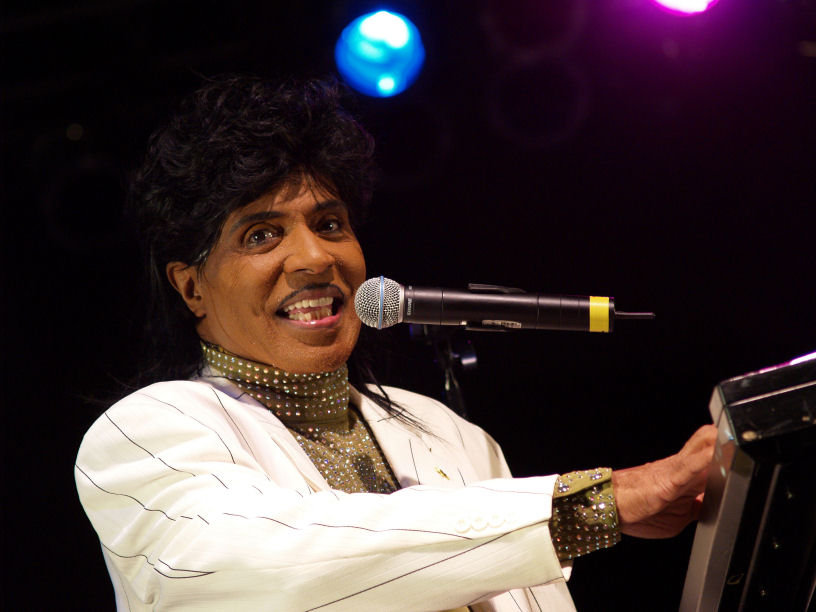
Little Richard made a guest appearance in the episode as himself.

"Special Edna" was written by Dennis Snee and directed by Bob Anderson as part of the fourteenth season of The Simpsons (2002–03). The EFCOT Center that is featured in the episode is a parody of Epcot, a theme park in the Walt Disney World Resort near Orlando. American musician Little Richard guest starred in the episode as himself.

== Release ==
The episode originally aired on the Fox network in the United States on January 5, 2003. It was viewed in approximately 9.0 million households that night. With a Nielsen rating of 8.5, the episode finished 18th in the ratings for the week of December 30, 2002 – January 5, 2003. It was the second highest-rated broadcast on Fox that week, following an NFC post-game show.

On December 6, 2011, "Special Edna" was released on Blu-ray and DVD as part of the box set The Simpsons – The Complete Fourteenth Season. Staff members Al Jean, Ian Maxtone-Graham, Matt Selman, Tom Gammill, Matt Warburton, Bob Anderson, Mike B. Anderson, and David Silverman, as well as cast member Nancy Cartwright, participated in the DVD audio commentary for the episode. Deleted scenes from the episode were also included in the box set.

DVD Movie Guide's Colin Jacobson commented: "I’ve liked episodes that focus on Krapappel, but on the other hand, her relationship with Skinner has always been a bit of a dud. Those two factors cancel each other out to leave this as an average show, though the mockery of EPCOT scores some points. I think the real EPCOT is pretty fun, actually, but the program delivers some amusing pokes at it."

"Special Edna" was named the best episode of the fourteenth season of The Simpsons by IGN writers Robert Canning, Eric Goldman, Dan Iverson, and Brian Zoromski. They commented: "First and foremost, this episode, as the title implies, is a nice spotlight on poor, overworked, underpaid Mrs. Krabappel. Krabappel's relationship with Principal Skinner takes center stage [...] But there's a ton more to this episode, including Grampa's story about serving as a four year old in World War I; Milhouse showing up with his uncle to give Bart a ride in a Blackhawk Helicopter; and a trip to a very thinly veiled parody of Disney World's EPCOT Center [...] that is filled with spot on parodies like the World of Tomorrow ride, which is a horribly dated 1960s take on the far future of the year 1984."

== Cultural references ==
The episode title is a take on the shortened form of "special education". EFCOT Center is a parody of EPCOT Center. When Bart informs his family about his pity date with Krabappel, Lisa mockingly asks "What happened to the Bart Simpson who put the mothballs in the beef stew?", a reference to lyrics from the 1990 Simpsons rap "Do the Bartman". The "Ride of Broken Dreams" is a mockery of the Enron scandal on its rise and fall into bankruptcy.
