= Helter Shelter (The Simpsons) =

- The Simpsons episode
- Episode no.: Season 14; Episode 5
- Directed by: Mark Kirkland
- Written by: Brian Pollack; Mert Rich
- Production code: DABF21
- Original air date: December 1, 2002

Guest appearances
- David Lander as Squiggy; Larry Holmes as himself

Episode features
- Chalkboard gag: "Milhouse did not test cootie positive"
- Couch gag: In a parody of the MacIntosh paint program, Kid Pix, a mouse cursor drags Homer from the left side of the couch to the right, changes the wall color from pink to green, and replaces Marge's boat painting with the Mona Lisa.
- Commentary: Al Jean; Dan Greaney; Carolyn Omine; Kevin Curran; Mark Kirkland; David Silverman; J. Stewart Burns; Allen Glazier; Steven Dean Moore

Episode chronology
← Previous "Large Marge"	Next → "The Great Louse Detective"
- The Simpsons season 14

"Helter Shelter" is the fifth episode of the fourteenth season of the American animated television series The Simpsons. It originally aired on the Fox network in the United States on December 1, 2002. The episode was written by Brian Pollack and Mert Rich and directed by Mark Kirkland.

This was the last episode of the series to air that used traditional cel animation. Starting with the very next episode, "The Great Louse Detective", the show switched to digital permanently.

== Plot ==
After Homer is hit by a falling girder at work and suffers a mild head injury, Mr. Burns gives him luxury skybox tickets to a hockey game in order to keep him from suing the power plant. Homer, Marge and Bart ignore the game in favor of enjoying the amenities, while Lisa leaves the box in order to watch the game from rink-side. One of the players gives her his stick in gratitude for her useful advice, and Homer mounts it on the wall above her bed that night. In so doing, though, he releases a swarm of termites that cause severe damage to the house overnight. The Simpsons are forced to move out for six months so the house can be fumigated.

The family tries a number of options like staying at hotel but all the hotel rooms in town are booked. Finding themselves without any suitable lodgings after trying to stay with Lenny, Comic Book Guy, and Moe, they learn from Barney and Carl about The 1895 Challenge, a reality show in which a family must inhabit a Victorian era house and adopt a lifestyle consistent with the title year. Homer is reluctant at first, but takes the family to audition for the show. The producers select the Simpsons after watching Homer's overreactions to trivial things. The family has trouble adjusting to the drastic changes in daily life at first, leading to high ratings among viewers who enjoy watching their misery. However, Homer soon rallies their spirits and their attitudes improve as they begin to adapt to 1895 life. When the ratings begin to fall as a result, the producers introduce Squiggy from Laverne & Shirley into the show, even allowing him to use a Taser as a means of disrupting the peaceful situation. After this ploy fails to boost the ratings, the producers secretly airlift the house off its foundations and drop it in a river while the Simpsons are sleeping.

The crew films the house's plunge over a waterfall and its collapse after running aground. Squiggy is killed in the crash, but the Simpsons emerge unhurt from the wreckage and must forage for food and shelter in the wilderness, since the crew refuses to give them lunch. They soon encounter a group of savage-looking people who turn out to be a tribe of contestants from another reality show, left to fend for themselves after they lost their final challenge. They team up with the Simpsons to overpower the crew and return to civilization. With the family back in their newly fumigated house, Homer decides he will only watch scripted television shows, but can find nothing good to watch. He eventually falls victim to Bart's pranks with the garden hose outside, to the enjoyment of Marge and Lisa.

== Production ==
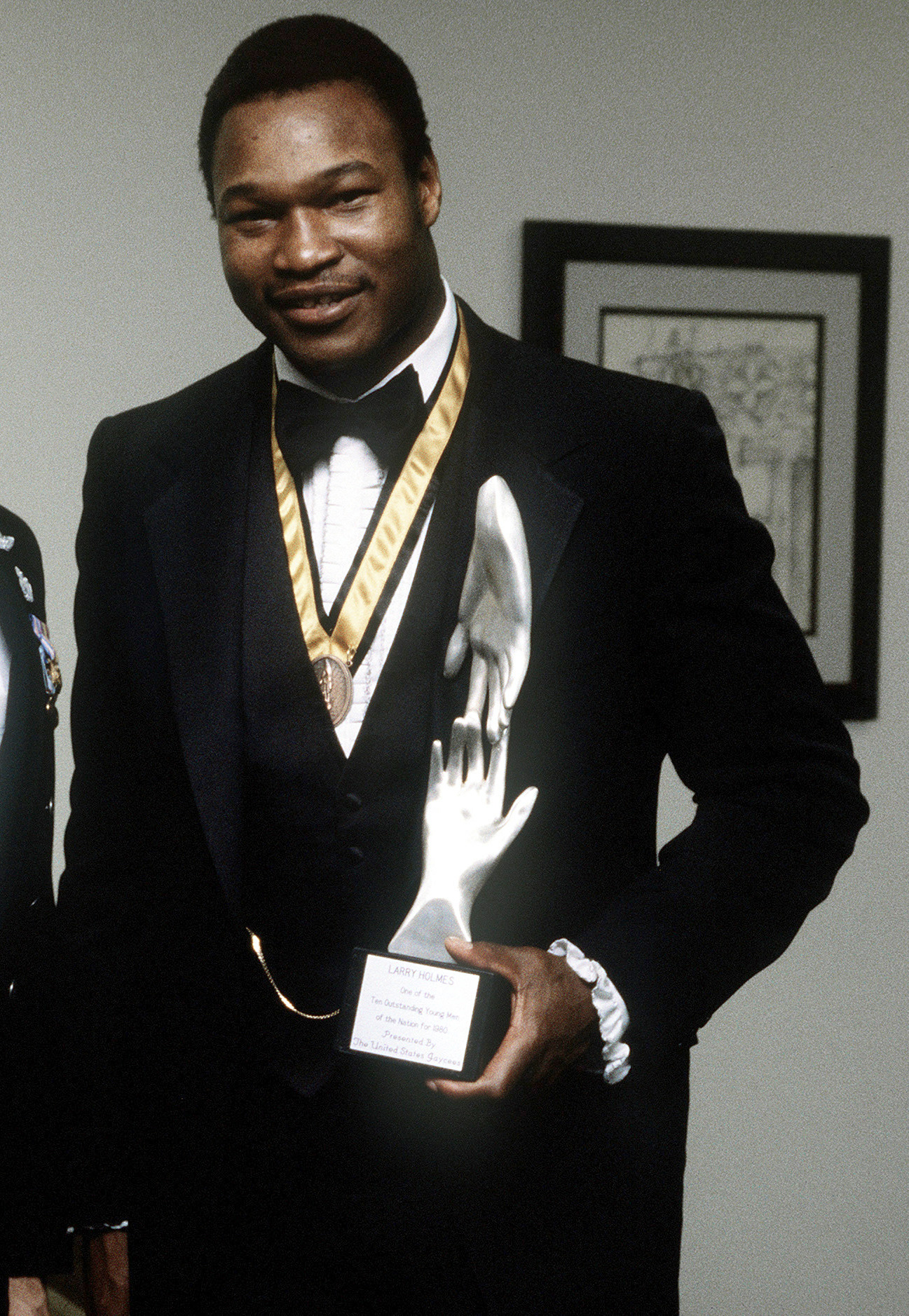
Boxer Larry Holmes, seen here in 1979, guest starred in the episode as himself.

"Helter Shelter" was written by Brian Pollack and Mert Rich and directed by Mark Kirkland as part of the fourteenth season of The Simpsons (2002–03). Actor David Lander, who portrayed Squiggy in Laverne & Shirley, guest starred in the episode as that character, while boxer Larry Holmes appeared as himself. This is the final aired episode of The Simpsons to be animated using the traditional ink-and-paint technique. Since the following episode, "The Great Louse Detective", The Simpsons has been animated with digital ink and paint. Digital animation had previously been used by the show on season 7's "Radioactive Man" and "The Simpsons 138th Episode Spectacular", season 12's "Tennis the Menace", and the season 14 "Treehouse of Horror" (a holdover from the season 13 production run), primarily to test the technique.

Whilst the family look for places to stay. Lisa informs them they could stay at a youth hostel. Bart then responds: “I do not want another lecture from a German backpacker about how we don't appreciate the National Park System!." In "The Heartbroke Kid", the family actually convert 742 Evergreen Terrace into a youth hostel in order to pay for Bart's weight loss camp bills.

== Cultural references ==
The TV show that the Simpson family goes on is a parody of a PBS TV show called The 1900 House. The show had a family live in a Victorian house, and live as if it were the year 1900. The scene in which the Simpsons wait outside their house waiting for time to "fly by" is a parody of the opening sequence of King of the Hill. The poison bottle has a face of James Coburn on it.

This is the third time Bill Cosby has been parodied on The Simpsons. There is an extra gag in that the Cosby family are losing ratings on their reality show, so the producers decide on the Simpsons; in the early years, The Cosby Show was a ratings rival with The Simpsons. "Squiggy" being sent to boost The 1895 Challenge ratings is another reference to The Cosby Show, who sent "Smitty" (Adam Sandler) to the Cosby's house. Following Cosby's initial conviction of multiple sexual assault cases in 2018, the scene which parodies Cosby in the auditions for The 1895 Challenge has been cut out of some television airings of this episode.

The episode title is a reference to The Beatles song "Helter Skelter".

Bart laments having access only to Mutt and Jeff comic books and is quoted as saying, "This has been the worst week of my life. I miss my toys and my video games. Mutt and Jeff comics are NOT funny! They're gay, I get it!". Although everything in the Victorian House is supposed to be from 1895 and before, Mutt and Jeff was not created until 1907.

Exterminators "A Bug's Death" is a parody (namely their logo) of the 1998 Disney/Pixar film A Bug's Life.

== Release ==
The episode originally aired on the Fox network in the United States on December 1, 2002. It was viewed in approximately 8.75 million households that night. With a Nielsen rating of 8.2, the episode finished 22nd in the ratings for the week of November 25 – December 1, 2002. It was the highest-rated broadcast on Fox that week, beating shows such as Boston Public, King of the Hill, 24, and Malcolm in the Middle. On December 6, 2011, "Helter Shelter" was released on Blu-ray and DVD as part of the box set The Simpsons – The Complete Fourteenth Season. Staff members Al Jean, Dan Greaney, Carolyn Omine, Kevin Curran, Mark Kirkland, David Silverman, J. Stewart Burns, Allen Glazier, and Steven Dean Moore participated in the DVD audio commentary for the episode. Deleted scenes from the episode were also included in the box set.

Since airing, "Helter Shelter" has received generally negative reviews from critics. DVD Movie Guide's Colin Jacobson commented that the story of the episode is "not a terrible idea for an episode, but it's not a particularly exciting one, either. The show plods through its scenario without much life, mostly because parodies of reality TV just aren't very interesting; the programs they mock are already so absurd that there's not much room for satire." Ryan Keefer of DVD Talk wrote that the episode is "a prime example of [the show's writers] trying to do something funny and falling flat."
