= A Star Is Born Again =

- The Simpsons episode
- Episode no.: Season 14; Episode 13
- Directed by: Michael Marcantel
- Written by: Brian Kelley
- Production code: EABF08
- Original air date: March 2, 2003

Guest appearances
- James L. Brooks as himself; Helen Fielding as herself; Marisa Tomei as Sara Sloane; Marcia Wallace as Edna Krabappel

Episode features
- Couch gag: The Simpsons are marionettes, who fail to reach the couch when they get caught up in each other's strings. The camera pans up to reveal Matt Groening as the puppet master, who throws down his marionettes in frustration.
- Commentary: Al Jean; Brian Kelley; Ian Maxtone-Graham; Matt Selman; Dan Castellaneta; Michael Marcantel; Mike B. Anderson; David Silverman

Episode chronology
← Previous "I'm Spelling as Fast as I Can"	Next → "Mr. Spritz Goes to Washington"
- The Simpsons season 14

"A Star Is Born Again" is the thirteenth episode of the fourteenth season of the American animated television series The Simpsons. It first aired on the Fox network in the United States on March 2, 2003. The episode was written by Brian Kelley and directed by Michael Marcantel.

In this episode, Ned Flanders begins dating a movie star who is in town to film a movie. Marisa Tomei guest starred as Sara Sloane. Writer Helen Fielding and Simpsons executive producer James L. Brooks appeared as themselves. The episode received positive reviews.

The episode owes much of its plot to Notting Hill (1999). While that film is about an actress finding happiness with the owner of an independent bookstore, the episode features Hollywood movie star Sara Sloane (Marisa Tomei) falling for Ned Flanders after visiting the Leftorium. The episode title doubles as a reference to the film A Star Is Born and being born again, meaning a person who has converted to Christianity, particularly in American evangelism.

This is the only Simpsons episode in which the same person has been accredited with two different names, where James L. Brooks is credited as the Executive Producer and Executive Creative Consultant, and again as Jim Brooks as a Special Guest Voice.

== Plot ==
During the annual Jellyfish Festival, which welcomes back the Stinging Red Jellyfish to the shores of Springfield, Ned Flanders becomes depressed because he is alone. The other adults have partners with whom to spend a romantic evening at the Jellyfish Cotillion, and this is Ned's first festival without his wife Maude.

Ned returns to the Leftorium to work on his taxes and take his mind off things. A woman comes in, looking for a pair of left-handed eyelash curlers. After chatting with Ned, she asks him out on a date. After she leaves, Ned notices a movie poster with her face on it; she is Sara Sloane, a movie star.

Sara and Ned hit it off, with Sara loving Ned's simple, quaint lifestyle and honesty. They go on several dates, though they encounter some problems, especially from tabloid reporters following them. Also, Sara is much less inhibited than Ned, causing some tension.

When her movie wraps, Sara asks Ned to return to Hollywood with her. Ned has a horrible dream about the bad things of Hollywood in a sequence that includes a cameo by series producer James L. Brooks, and also the "Hollywood" sign reading "Hollyweird", and refuses. Sara therefore tries staying in Springfield, to be with Ned. She slowly starts settling in with the locals, joining Marge's book club hosted by author Helen Fielding and going shopping with Ned.

At a concert, to which Sara wears a low-cut dress, Sara tells Ned she wants to have sex with him. Ned eventually relents, but insists on marriage if they are to continue a sexual relationship. Sara is unwilling to get married, and they break up and she returns to Hollywood. She gets a quickie marriage and divorce to Bob Balaban. Ned finds that he is now more attractive to women because of his famous relationship.

== Production ==
Marisa Tomei guest starred as Sara Sloane. Writer Helen Fielding appeared as herself. Fielding was the partner of Simpsons writer and producer Kevin Curran at the time the episode aired.

== Cultural references ==
- This episode is largely a parody of the film Notting Hill (1999).
- A billboard depicting Los Angeles personality Angelyne can be seen during Ned Flanders' Hollywood dream sequence.
- When Helen Fielding runs around being chased by bobbies and a man in a gorilla suit following the book club meeting and the end of the episode, it is an homage to the British sketch comedy The Benny Hill Show. The music featured in the sequence is "Yakety Sax", the music used in that series.
- Debussy's "Arabesque No. 1" and "Clair de Lune" were used as the background music for several scenes.
- After Sara asks Ned out on their first date (when she is leaving the Leftorium), Ned sings a version of America's "A Horse with No Name" referring to the date.

== Reception ==
=== Viewing figures ===
The episode was watched by 14.56 million viewers, which was the 22nd most-watched show that week.

=== Critical response ===
Colin Jacobson of DVD Movie Guide liked the contrast between Flanders and Sara and thought the plot "feels less contrived".

On Four Finger Discount, Guy Davis and Brendan Dando were "surprised by the sexy in this episode" and highlighted the performance by Marisa Tomei.

In a 2008 article, Entertainment Weekly named Marisa Tomei's role as Sara Sloane as one of the sixteen best guest appearances on The Simpsons.
