= Mr. Spritz Goes to Washington =

- The Simpsons episode
- Episode no.: Season 14; Episode 14
- Directed by: Lance Kramer
- Written by: John Swartzwelder
- Production code: EABF09
- Original air date: March 9, 2003

Guest appearance
- Joe Mantegna as Fat Tony

Episode features
- Couch gag: The Simpsons sit on the couch as normal. Homer clicks the remote control and sends the family to the Stone Age, clicks the remote again and sends the family to the era of the Roman Empire where they watch a gladiator match, and clicks it a final time to send the family to the present.
- Commentary: Al Jean; Matt Selman; Kevin Curran; J. Stewart Burns; Michael Price; Tom Gammill; Marc Wilmore; Lance Kramer; Mike B. Anderson

Episode chronology
| ← Previous "A Star Is Born Again" | Next → "C.E.D'oh" |
- The Simpsons season 14

"Mr. Spritz Goes to Washington" is the fourteenth episode of the fourteenth season of the American animated television series The Simpsons. It originally aired on the Fox network in the United States on March 9, 2003. The episode was written by John Swartzwelder and directed by Lance Kramer.

In this episode, the Simpsons' home becomes uninhabitable because of airplane noise. Krusty is elected to Congress and eventually has a bill passed to change the flight path. The episode received mixed reviews.

== Plot ==
After their house is shaken by a tremendous rumble one morning, the Simpsons discover that they're living directly beneath the newest flight path to Springfield International Airport, after Mayor Quimby has it redirected away from where he is entertaining his mistress. A complaint to an airport official has no effect, who tells them to go home and learn to live with it. Unable to sell the house because of the noise, Homer and Marge then go to their congressman Horace Wilcox, who has been Springfield's representative since 1933. While Wilcox is eager to help, he is so upset by their misfortune that he suffers a heart attack and dies.

Bart asks Krusty the Clown to run for Congress and he agrees, thinking he can also eliminate everything with which the Government is harassing him. He is adopted as the Republican candidate. His campaign starts badly because he has offended so many minorities with his politically incorrect jokes, but Lisa helps him turn his campaign around by having him connect with regular families and citizens. With this advice and a very helpful Fox News programme, he is elected.

To Krusty's chagrin, no-one pays attention to a freshman Congressman, and he is appointed to useless committees, or set to work cleaning the graffiti off the walls. He, and the Simpsons, are about to give up, but Walter Mondale, who is working as a janitor in Congress, explains to them how a bill really becomes a law. With his help, Bart blackmails a key congressman with a videotape that shows him abusing the free mail policy. Homer manages to get another congressman drunk (and himself as well). Finally, during a session in Congress, Mondale and Lisa, with Homer's drunken diversion, fix the Air Traffic Bill with a paperclip to another bill giving orphans American flags. When the bill comes up for a vote, both the blackmailed congressman and the drunk one consent, and it is passed. Krusty praises the processes of democracy. At home, the Simpsons are happy to get the peace and quiet that they heroically fought for. Homer says that the planes are now flying where they belong — over the homes of poor people.

== Controversy ==
At one point during the episode, the family is watching Krusty and his opponent debate on the Fox News Channel, which showed several headlines in its news ticker that parodied the right-leaning network's political views. Among the headlines in the news ticker were "Pointless news crawls up 37 percent," "Do Democrats cause cancer? Find out at foxnews.com," "Rupert Murdoch: Terrific dancer," "Dow down 5,000 points," "Study: 92 percent of Democrats are gay," "JFK posthumously joins Republican Party," and "Oil slicks found to keep seals young, supple." Several months after the episode originally aired, Matt Groening claimed that Fox News, the corporate sister to the Fox Broadcasting Company that airs the show, threatened to sue Groening, but opted against "suing itself." Groening mentioned that while they got away with the joke, they were no longer allowed to parody news tickers on the show. Despite that, the show would still parody Fox News on several occasions afterward.

The Dow Jones & Company, which owned the Dow Jones Industrial Average that was parodied in the news ticker, would be purchased by News Corporation in 2007 and would be a corporate sister to Fox until the 2013 split between the new News Corporation and 21st Century Fox, which was further split with the acquisition of the film and television assets of 21st Century Fox by The Walt Disney Company on March 19, 2019, with Fox News Channel now part of the Fox Corporation.

== Cultural references ==
The episode title is a reference to the movie Mr. Smith Goes to Washington. The scene where Mayor Quimby, upon hearing his mistress speak for the first time, remarks that he "regrets building her that opera house" is a reference to Citizen Kane, where the title character opens an opera house for his mistress, despite her lack of vocal talent. Krusty's campaign ad ends with four famous historic scenes, all edited to add Krusty's face: a photo of the Apollo 11 landing, Raising the Flag on Iwo Jima, Jeff Widener's photo of Tank Man, and Jack Ruby Shoots Lee Harvey Oswald.

== Reception ==
=== Viewing figures ===
The episode was watched by 14.43 million viewers, which was the 11th most-watched show that week.

=== Critical response ===
Colin Jacobson of DVD Movie Guide thought the episode recycled plot points from previous episodes featuring elections and repeated a previously used joke. He wrote that "[t]he show still delivers some laughs, but the repetitive moments harm it."

On Four Finger Discount, Guy Davis and Brendan Dando liked the writing by John Swartzwelder. They also thought the episode treated Republicans "in a bad light", but they attributed that to the era in which the episode aired.
