= Three Gays of the Condo =

- The Simpsons episode
- Episode no.: Season 14; Episode 17
- Directed by: Mark Kirkland
- Written by: Matt Warburton (and Story Editor)
- Production code: EABF12
- Original air date: April 13, 2003

Guest appearances
- Scott Thompson as Grady; "Weird Al" Yankovic as himself; Terry W. Greene as Large Gay Military Man

Episode features
- Couch gag: The family, depicted as frozen food, is put in a deep-fryer, taken out, dumped onto the couch, and salted.
- Commentary: Al Jean; Matt Warburton; Ian Maxtone-Graham; Matt Selman; Carolyn Omine; Yeardley Smith; Scott Thompson "Weird Al" Yankovic; Mark Kirkland; David Silverman

Episode chronology
← Previous "'Scuse Me While I Miss the Sky"	Next → "Dude, Where's My Ranch?"
- The Simpsons season 14

"Three Gays of the Condo" is the seventeenth episode of the fourteenth season of the American animated television series The Simpsons. It originally aired on the Fox network in the United States on April 13, 2003. The episode was written by Matt Warburton and directed by Mark Kirkland. The episode's title is a parody of the classic American political thriller film Three Days of the Condor (1975).

In this episode, Homer learns that Marge was planning on leaving him but got pregnant with Bart, so he thinks that is the reason she stayed with him. Upset, Homer moves in with two gay men, Grady and Julio. Musician "Weird Al" Yankovic appeared as himself.

The episode received mixed reviews. However, the episode won the Primetime Emmy Award for Outstanding Animated Program, and writer Matt Warburton won the Annie Award for Outstanding Achievement for Writing in an Animated Television/Broadcast Production for this episode.

== Plot ==
The Simpson family is working on a jigsaw puzzle. When they learn the final piece is missing, the family looks for it. Homer looks through Marge's memory box and finds a poster of Moe's Tavern's grand opening (advertised as Meaux's Tavern). On the back, Marge wrote that Homer made the opening the worst night of her life by making her sit there while he got drunk and played an arcade game. Later, as she took him to the hospital for alcohol poisoning, she wrote that she was leaving him. Wondering why Marge stayed with him, Homer finds a hospital appointment card dated two days later, confirming she was pregnant with Bart. When Homer confronts Marge, she says she was upset that night but admits that Homer still does things that annoy her. Homer realizes Marge has been secretly resenting him.

The next day, they argue again, and Homer leaves the house. He finds a newspaper with an apartment listing asking for a third roommate. Learning that the apartment is in Springfield's gay district, Homer moves in with a gay couple, Grady and Julio. Julio is unsure about Homer, but Grady likes him. At home, Lisa misses Homer and wants Marge to apologize. At a gay club, Homer tells Grady and Julio that his relationship with Marge is in trouble.

Marge and the kids visit Homer and bring "Weird Al" Yankovic, who sings a parody of John Mellencamp's "Jack & Diane", to tell Homer that Marge loves him. Marge asks Homer out on a date. As he prepares, Homer gets nervous and drinks margaritas. When he arrives, she is upset that he is late and drunk, and she leaves him. Later, Grady comforts Homer and kisses him. Homer realizes that Grady has feelings for him, and he jumps out of a window, saddening Grady. At Moe's, Homer is about to realize that all his problems are caused by alcohol when Moe forces beer down Homer's throat, giving him alcohol poisoning, and takes him to the hospital. After Homer awakens, Dr. Hibbert tells him that this was not as bad as the first time he treated him for alcohol poisoning. Homer says it was the night that destroyed his marriage. Hibbert disagrees and plays a tape from the first incident where Marge says that she loves him, proving she married him because she loved him. Marge arrives and says she still does, and they reconcile.

== Production ==
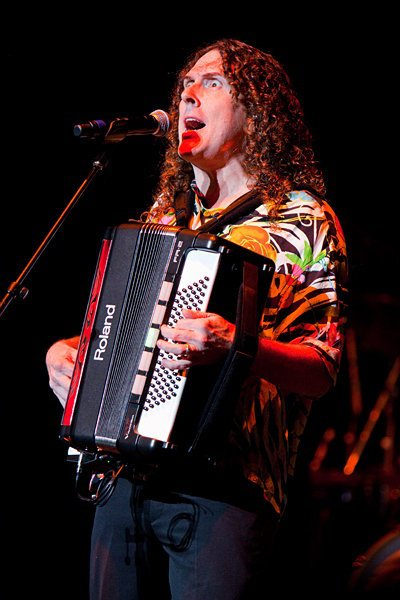
"Weird Al" Yankovic (pictured) guest-starred as himself

Harvey Fierstein was asked to reprise his role as Karl from the second season episode "Simpson and Delilah" in a cameo appearance. In the script, Homer was thrown out of the house by Marge, and encountered Karl. The purpose of the appearance was to introduce a gay couple that Homer would live with. Fierstein, however, felt that "the script was a lot of very clever gay jokes, and there just wasn't that Simpsons twist" and turned the role down.

The jigsaw puzzle that the family builds is titled "Concert in Golden Gate Park". Writer Michael Price had pitched a joke where Homer drools "mmm, Ferlinghetti..." in reference to Lawrence Ferlinghetti, Poet Laureate of San Francisco.

In December 2018, as part of the 30th anniversary of the series, this episode was selected by executive producer Al Jean to represent the fourteenth season during a Simpsons marathon on FXX.

== Reception ==
=== Viewing figures ===
The episode was watched by 12.02 million viewers, which was the 19th most watched show that week.

=== Critical response ===
The episode was part of a DVD boxed set release called The Simpsons Kiss and Tell: The Story of Their Love, and in his review of the release, Andy Dougan of the Evening Times characterized the episode along with "Natural Born Kissers", "Large Marge", and "The Way We Weren't", as "four of the funniest episodes of recent series".

Comparing the episode with eighth season episode "Homer's Phobia", which also dealt with the topic of homosexuality, Jackson Cresswell of Collider said the previous episode was better. He thought this episode, which was another one that dealt with a separation of Homer and Marge, "had been done many times before and was a weak device to get to the observational and situational comedy."

On Four Finger Discount, Guy Davis and Brendan Dando called the content regarding homosexuality to be "more sensitive and insightful and fun and inclusive" than the rest of the episode although it would be insensitive in 2021. They also questioned why Marge needed to be the one to apologize to Homer.

=== Awards and nominations ===
At the 55th Primetime Creative Arts Emmy Awards, the episode won the Primetime Emmy Award for Outstanding Animated Program (Programming Less Than One Hour). At the 31st Annie Awards, writer Matt Warburton won the Annie Award for Outstanding Achievement for Writing in an Animated Television/Broadcast Production for his script to this episode.
