= Brake My Wife, Please =

- The Simpsons episode
- Episode no.: Season 14; Episode 20
- Directed by: Pete Michels
- Written by: Tim Long
- Production code: EABF15
- Original air date: May 11, 2003

Guest appearances
- Steve Buscemi as himself; Jackson Browne as himself; Jane Kaczmarek as Judge Constance Harm

Episode features
- Couch gag: The couch is replaced with a cardboard cutout novelty backdrop. The family sticks their heads in the holes as a photographer snaps their picture.
- Commentary: Al Jean; Tim Long; Matt Selman; John Frink; Michael Price; Pete Michels

Episode chronology
← Previous "Old Yeller-Belly"	Next → "The Bart of War"
- The Simpsons season 14

"Brake My Wife, Please" is the twentieth episode of the fourteenth season of the American animated television series The Simpsons. It originally aired on the Fox network in the United States on May 11, 2003. The episode was written by Tim Long and directed by Pete Michels.

In this episode, Homer loses his driver's license, and Marge must do all the family's driving. When she accidentally runs over Homer, she must also care for him. She discovers that she hates him. To show he loves her, Homer organizes a dinner in her honor. Jane Kaczmarek guest starred as Judge Constance Harm. Actor Steve Buscemi and musician Jackson Browne appeared as themselves. The episode received mixed reviews.

== Plot ==
During a school trip to the Springfield Aquarium with Marge chaperoning, Bart is injured by sea life while committing a prank and is taken to the hospital. Because Homer has the family's health insurance card, the family waits several hours for him at the hospital because Marge cannot contact him. After Homer arrives, she insists that he purchase a cellular telephone. Later, while driving, Homer calls Barney on his phone to complain about the difficulty of driving while talking on the phone; Barney suggests buying a headset so that Homer can talk hands-free. At the store, the seller convinces Homer to buy numerous devices to plug into his car instead. Distracted by his devices, he accidentally drives off a pier into the water.

After Homer is rescued, Judge Constance Harm revokes his driver's license, which forces an increasingly stressed Marge to do all of the family's driving. When Marge is too busy to drive Homer to Moe's Tavern, Homer decides to walk there instead. Finding that he enjoys walking, Homer begins doing so regularly, and leads the town in a song about the joys of walking. As he walks into a road, Marge hits him with her car.

Homer sustains a crushed pelvis and requires Marge to care for him. An apologetic Marge says that hitting Homer was an accident, but when he boasts of his early recovery, she knocks his cane away, causing him to fall to the floor. Homer realises that she is trying to hurt him on purpose, which Marge initially denies, before admitting that she has come to hate him. They see a marriage counselor who advises them to write down the people important to their lives. Homer only writes his own name, and Marge is saddened and leaves. Homer asks the counselor's advice to win Marge back, and is advised to perform one completely unselfish gesture. Homer invites all the people of Springfield to the Simpson house for a backyard dinner in Marge's honour (except for Ned Flanders, who is sent to Montana by Homer under the false impression that Jesus wants to meet him). Returning in a foul mood after more driving, Marge walks to the backyard and is welcomed by everyone. Luigi introduces singer Jackson Browne, who performs a Marge-themed version of one of his songs with Homer. Marge is touched and forgives Homer.

== Production ==
Jane Kaczmarek reprised her role as Judge Constance Harm. Kaczmarek first voiced this role in the thirteenth season episode "The Parent Rap". Actor Steve Buscemi appeared as himself.

Musician Jackson Browne also appeared as himself singing a parody of his song "Rosie". Dan Castellaneta went to record his lines with Browne at his recording studio. He thought, "'Wow, this is cool. I'm recording with Jackson Browne.' And then Jackson Browne said, 'Wow, this is cool. I'm recording with Homer Simpson.'"

== Reception ==
=== Viewing figures ===
The episode was watched by 10.56 million viewers, which was the 36th most-watched show that week.

=== Critical response ===
Jackson Cresswell of Collider said that he enjoyed the episode because it was "nice to see these characters interact within their established world instead of being put in extreme circumstances."

On Four Finger Discount, Guy Davis and Brendan Dando called the episode "just kind of there." They thought the story of Homer and Marge being separated was repetitive.

=== Themes and analysis ===
Joseph Rose of The Oregonian called the episode "one big take-off on distracted driving and America's sometimes unhealthy relationship with our automobiles." Describing Homer's distracted driving, he said,

Nothing beats the over-the-top commentary on distracted driving from 4:53 to 6:29. Homer drives while using an in-car deep fryer, watching TV, playing with a Lite-Brite and operating a fog machine. He then tries to fax an "SOS" using a dashboard fax machine as he drives off a pier. Not surprising, he loses his license after that.
