= Barting Over =

- The Simpsons episode
- Episode no.: Season 14; Episode 11
- Directed by: Matthew Nastuk
- Written by: Andrew Kreisberg
- Production code: EABF05
- Original air date: February 16, 2003

Guest appearances
- Travis Barker as himself; Tom DeLonge as himself; Mark Hoppus as himself; Tony Hawk as himself; Jane Kaczmarek as Judge Constance Harm

Episode features
- Chalkboard gag: "I will not" (Bart destroys the chalkboard with an axe)
- Couch gag: The living room is made of gingerbread and candy. The Simpsons are gingerbread people who rush to the couch. Homer takes a bite out of Bart's head.
- Commentary: Matt Groening; Al Jean; Matt Selman; Kevin Curran; J. Stewart Burns; Tom Gammill; Max Pross; Dan Castellaneta; Hank Azaria; Mark Hoppus; Tony Hawk

Episode chronology
| ← Previous "Pray Anything" | Next → "I'm Spelling as Fast as I Can" |
- The Simpsons season 14

"Barting Over" is the eleventh episode of the fourteenth season of the American animated television series The Simpsons, advertised by Fox, and indicated on-screen to be the 300th episode of the show (though in broadcast order, it is the 302nd episode, as noted in the episode proper, and the 301st episode in production order). It originally aired on the Fox network in the United States on February 16, 2003. The episode was written by Andrew Kreisberg and directed by Matthew Nastuk.

In this episode, Bart discovers that he used to be a child star in commercials—and that Homer spent all the money he earned. In retaliation, Bart petitions the court to be legally emancipated, and he moves out of the house. Jane Kaczmarek guest starred as Judge Constance Harm. The band Blink-182 and skateboarder Tony Hawk appeared as themselves. The episode received mixed reviews.

== Plot ==
While Bart and Lisa are cleaning the garage, they find a commercial where Bart is cast as a baby with bad breath. Bart does not remember being a child actor (stating he doesn't remember being in any commercial, before eating a Butterfinger candy bar), and Marge reassures him that he earned a lot of money from it. Homer confesses that he had spent Bart's money. When he asks why Homer would be so selfish in doing so since Marge promised to put that in a trust fund for his future, he explains that he needed the money. Homer had to buy back incriminating photos of himself endangering Bart's life from a hotel balcony to avoid a scandal. Furious, Bart decides that he can no longer live with Homer and appeals to be emancipated.

During the trial, Homer's anger issues prove that Bart is not safe living with him, and Homer is no longer his legal guardian. Furious, he tries to attack Judge Harm, but is stopped by the bailiff and dragged away for contempt.

Bart sadly says goodbye to Marge and Lisa, then moves into a loft. Homer struggles to cope with Bart's disappearance and plans to prove that he can be a better father. That night, Bart is scared away by a rat and runs into the elevator, which takes him to the hangout of Tony Hawk and Blink-182. He befriends Hawk and decorates his loft with luxuries, and when the rest of the family visit him, Bart prefers his new life and still refuses to come back.

Hawk invites Bart to his Skewed Tour, where Homer, Lisa, and Marge follow him. To win back Bart's respect, Homer beats Hawk in a skateboarding duel. After Homer promises that he will never mistreat him again, Bart accepts his apology and moves back in. Homer starts to earn back Bart's money by acting in an advertisement for a drug for baldness and impotency called 'Viagrogaine' and which he's embarrassed of. Bart reassures him that no one will remember it in 50 years. On Homer's death 50 years later, an elderly Nelson Muntz laughs at his grave before coughing from the attempt.

== Production ==
FOX insisted that the 300th episode be scheduled specifically on February 16, 2003, so that there was time to plan a huge promotion for the episode. However, the actual 300th episode had already aired two weeks prior. This was referenced in this episode during a joke where Lisa tallies the number of Homer's schemes at 300; Marge comments "I could've sworn it was 302."

Jane Kaczmarek reprised her role as Judge Constance Harm. Kaczmarek first voiced this role in the thirteenth season episode "The Parent Rap". Blink-182 recorded their lines for the episode on April 24, 2002; Tony Hawk recorded his five days later on April 29. Mark Hoppus of Blink-182 has stated that being on The Simpsons was "truly one of those 'wow, this is unreal' moments that I've been lucky enough to experience. It still makes my day every time I think about it."

== Reception ==
=== Viewing figures ===
The episode earned a 10.7 rating and was watched by 21.31 million viewers, which was 15th highest rated show that week.

=== Critical response ===
In 2007, Simon Crerar of The Times listed Tony Hawk's performance as one of the thirty-three funniest cameos in the history of the show.

In 2011, Colin Jacobson of DVD Movie Guide said the episode seems dated due to the appearance of Blink-182 and Tony Hawk, who were popular in the early 2000s. He also thought the episode "isn't bad, but it's ordinary."

On Four Finger Discount, Guy Davis and Brendan Dando also thought the guest stars were reflective of the early 2000s. They enjoyed the episode and liked the premise of Bart tiring of Homer's treatment of him.

In 2023, Tony Sokol of Den of Geek named the episode the 9th best episode of the series from the 2000s. He called it "one of the most callous entries in The Simpsons canon" for having Homer waste the money intended for Bart. He also thought "[t]he episode comes together" with the appearances by Blink-182 and Tony Hawk.
