= Bart vs. Lisa vs. the Third Grade =

- The Simpsons episode
- Episode no.: Season 14; Episode 3
- Directed by: Steven Dean Moore
- Written by: Tim Long
- Production code: DABF20
- Original air date: November 17, 2002

Guest appearance
- Tony Bennett (archival audio)

Episode features
- Chalkboard gag: "Fish do not like coffee."
- Couch gag: In a parody of the opening of the 1960s sitcom, Get Smart, Homer goes through many futuristic doors and passageways until he reaches the phone booth, falls through the floor, and lands on the couch (with the rest of the family already seated).
- Commentary: Al Jean; Tim Long; Ian Maxtone-Graham; John Frink; Kevin Curran; Steven Dean Moore; Mike B. Anderson; Michael Price

Episode chronology
← Previous "How I Spent My Strummer Vacation"	Next → "Large Marge"
- The Simpsons season 14

"Bart vs. Lisa vs. the Third Grade" is the third episode of the fourteenth season of the American animated television series The Simpsons. It originally aired on the Fox network in the United States on November 17, 2002. In the episode, the Simpsons buy a satellite television system, which Bart spends so much time watching that he does not study for an important achievement test. He scores so low that Principal Skinner demotes him to third grade, while Lisa does so well that she is moved up to third grade. The two are placed in the same class and become rivals. During a trip to Capital City, they get separated from their class and are forced to help each other in order to find their classmates.

== Plot ==
Homer buys a satellite system with over 500 channels. He and Bart become addicted to it, and Bart does not study at all for an important upcoming achievement test, even as Lisa is spending all her time preparing. Once the test is done, Principal Skinner announces the results at a school assembly. Not only does Bart fail the test and is demoted to the third grade, but Lisa aces the test and gets promoted to the third grade, where they meet their new teacher, Audrey McConnell. Interestingly during class, Bart performs well on tests, having memorized the answers from his previous experience in the third grade, while Lisa has a hard time adjusting to the class. Audrey decides to clamp their desks together after Bart answers a trick question he had seen the previous year, as the teacher thinks Lisa needs Bart's help. Later, Bart gets an A on a map test while Lisa only gets an A−. Bart says that the test was easy and recites all of the answers to Lisa, which he had memorized from last year in third grade (because he claims that the answer key never changes). Lisa proclaims that Bart cheated but the teacher did not hear Bart's recitation and tells Lisa to stop being jealous.

Bart and Lisa are made field trip partners as part of the buddy system on a field trip to Capital City. When they are there, they hear that the flag for the state Springfield is an embarrassment (it contains a Confederate flag, despite the state being from the North), and their teacher assigns for homework an assignment to design a new flag. Lisa calls Marge as she designs her flag, which says "To Fraternal Love". On the phone, she complains about and makes fun of Bart, unmindful of the fact that Bart is overhearing the conversation on another phone and getting very angry about her comments. The next day, Bart, Lisa and the other third-graders hand over their flag designs to the Governor. When the Governor sees Lisa's design, she starts to cry and displays the flag which now reads "Learn to Fart". This appalls Lisa, as Bart innocently admonishes her for making the Governor cry.

Later, Bart again teases Lisa and they get in a fight and miss the bus heading back to Springfield. The fight brings them out of the parking lot and into the forest. As a result, the two wind up getting lost. Lisa tells Bart she is hurt by his behavior and Bart sounds somewhat apologetic, though he also adds in the interest of full disclosure that he wants to say he is sorry for using Homer's steamroller a while back to crush Lisa's bike, which he then blamed on Gypsies. Back in Springfield, Skinner informs Homer and Marge that Bart and Lisa are missing. They go to Capital City to find them. Meanwhile, Bart and Lisa are found by a family of hillbillies, who save them by driving them back to Capital City. Marge is ecstatic on seeing her children safe and sound. Worried about the effects of placing Bart and Lisa in the same class, Skinner suggests that they return to the "status quo ante" – both Simpson kids go back to their proper grades.

== Production ==
"Bart vs. Lisa vs. the Third Grade" was written by Tim Long and directed by Steven Dean Moore as part of the fourteenth season of The Simpsons (2002–03). American singer Tony Bennett is credited as guest starring in the episode, though his lines were taken from archival audio.

== Release ==
The episode originally aired on the Fox network in the United States on November 17, 2002. It was viewed in approximately 7.47 million households that night.

With a Nielsen rating of 7.0, the episode finished 44th in the ratings for the week of November 11–17, 2002 (tied with new episodes of Becker and Boomtown). It was the highest-rated broadcast on Fox that week, beating shows such as King of the Hill, 24, and Malcolm in the Middle.

On December 6, 2011, "Bart vs. Lisa vs. the Third Grade" was released on Blu-ray and DVD as part of the box set The Simpsons – The Complete Fourteenth Season. Staff members Al Jean, Tim Long, Ian Maxtone-Graham, John Frink, Kevin Curran, Steven Dean Moore, Mike B. Anderson, and Michael Price participated in the DVD audio commentary for the episode.

DVD Movie Guide's Colin Jacobson wrote that the episode "opens with a TV-based segment awfully reminiscent of Season Two's 'Homer Vs. Lisa and the Eighth Commandment' and doesn’t get much better from there. As usual, we discover a few laughs along the way – particularly when Bart tries to teach mnemonics – but these are less plentiful than I’d like. This ends up as a wholly mediocre episode."

Aaron Peck of High-Def Digest called the episode "memorable".
