= Old Yeller-Belly =

- The Simpsons episode
- Episode no.: Season 14; Episode 19
- Directed by: Bob Anderson
- Written by: John Frink & Don Payne
- Production code: EABF14
- Original air date: May 4, 2003

Guest appearances
- Stacy Keach as Howard K. Duff VII; John Kassir as Various Animals

Episode features
- Chalkboard gag: "My pen is not a booger launcher"
- Couch gag: In a parody of the black and white photograph, Lunchtime atop a Skyscraper, the family is dressed as construction workers of the early 20th century and sitting on a girder watching TV.
- Commentary: Al Jean; John Frink; Matt Selman; Tim Long; Michael Price; Stacy Keach

Episode chronology
← Previous "Dude, Where's My Ranch?"	Next → "Brake My Wife, Please"
- The Simpsons season 14

"Old Yeller-Belly" is the nineteenth episode of the fourteenth season of the American television series The Simpsons. It originally aired on the Fox network in the United States on May 4, 2003. The episode was written by John Frink and Don Payne and was directed by Bob Anderson.

In this episode, Santa's Little Helper fails to help Homer when he is trapped in a fire. He is rebuffed by the family, but eventually accepted again. Stacy Keach guest starred as Howard K. Duff VII. The episode received mixed reviews.

== Plot ==
After Bart's treehouse is destroyed in a fight between him, Lisa, and their respective friend groups, Marge hires the population of a nearby Amish community to build a new, much larger treehouse. Bart's housewarming party goes well until the improperly-installed electrical wiring sets the treehouse on fire; everyone escapes without incident except for Homer, who is rescued by the family cat Snowball II after their dog Santa's Little Helper proves too afraid to even try. Homer denounces Santa's Little Helper as a coward and becomes very cold towards him while showing a lot more fondness and appreciation for Snowball II, who is hailed as a local hero for saving Homer's life.

Santa's Little Helper is tethered in the backyard and neglected until he finds an empty beer can and flips the can into the air, balancing it on his nose and drinking the last few drops. A Springfield Shopper reporter witnesses this and takes a photo of the scene, which is printed on the front page of the newspaper. Upon seeing the photo, Duff Beer decides to retire Duffman in favor of hiring the dog as their new mascot, renaming him Suds McDuff. Before Suds has a chance to make the Simpson family rich, however, his original sleazy owner and racing trainer (previously shown in the series premiere episode "Simpsons Roasting on an Open Fire") turns up to prove to Duff Beer that he is Suds's rightful owner, using a tape of a prior TV interview in which Homer unwittingly renounced his ownership of Suds.

The family figures that they can get Suds back by restoring Duffman's old job, so they track him down and help him form a plan to get his job back at a Duff Beer-sponsored beach volleyball event. During the event, Homer gets the crowd's attention by floating on a keg of beer near the beach and pretending to drown. As Homer expected, Suds is not brave enough to save him, however Duffman also fails to save Homer when a shark suddenly approaches. The shark swims up and tries to attack Homer, but instead it bites the beer keg open and ends up getting drunk, which captivates the crowd so much that Duff Beer hastily declares that "Duff McShark" will be their new mascot. With Suds now out of the job, his old trainer decides to return him to the Simpsons, who change his name back to Santa's Little Helper.

== Cultural references ==
- Yellow belly is an abusive term for a coward.
- The episode title is a reference to the 1957 Disney live-action feature Old Yeller. Santa's Little Helper's alter ego as Suds McDuff is a reference to the old Bud Light mascot Spuds McKenzie.

== Reception ==
=== Viewing figures ===
The episode was watched by 11.59 million viewers, which was the 32nd most-watched show that week.

=== Critical response ===
Colin Jacobson of DVD Movie Guide liked the jokes and the return of the original owner of Santa's Little Helper. However, he thought the references to Spuds McKenzie were dated since the advertising character had not appeared in over a decade by the time the episode aired.

On Four Finger Discount, Brendan Dando liked the episode and called Homer's anger at the dog to be justified while Guy Davis thought it was "okay in the middle" and was neither good nor bad.
