= The Simpsons season 14 =

Season of television series

The Simpsons
- Season 14
- DVD cover featuring Kang
- Showrunners: Al Jean (21 episodes); Mike Scully (1 episode)
- No. of episodes: 22

Release
- Original network: Fox
- Original release: November 3, 2002 – May 18, 2003

Season chronology
- ← Previous; Season 13 Next → Season 15

The fourteenth season of the American animated sitcom The Simpsons aired on Fox between November 3, 2002, and May 18, 2003. It was produced by Gracie Films and 20th Century Fox Television. The showrunner for the fourteenth production season was Al Jean, who executive produced 21 of 22 episodes. The other episode, "How I Spent My Strummer Vacation", was run by Mike Scully. The fourteenth season has met with mostly positive reviews and won two Primetime Emmy Awards, including Outstanding Animated Program (For Programming less than One Hour), four Annie Awards and a Writers Guild of America Award. This season contains the show's 300th episode, "Barting Over".

== Production ==
Writers credited with episodes in the fourteenth season included J. Stewart Burns, Kevin Curran, John Frink & Don Payne, Dana Gould, Dan Greaney, Brian Kelley, Tim Long, Ian Maxtone-Graham, Carolyn Omine, Mike Scully, Matt Selman, John Swartzwelder, Matt Warburton and Marc Wilmore. Freelance writers included Brian Pollack & Mert Rich, Sam O'Neal & Neal Boushall, Dennis Snee and Allen Glazier. Animation directors included Bob Anderson, Mike B. Anderson, Chris Clements, Mark Kirkland, Lance Kramer, Nancy Kruse, Lauren MacMullan, Pete Michels, Steven Dean Moore, Matthew Nastuk, Michael Polcino, Jim Reardon and David Silverman.

Season 14 marked the show's permanent switch to digital ink and paint, starting with "The Great Louse Detective."

Four episodes ("How I Spent My Strummer Vacation", "Bart vs. Lisa vs. the Third Grade", "Large Marge" and "Helter Shelter") were holdovers from season 13's production run and used traditional cel animation. Another season 13 holdover episode ("Treehouse of Horror XIII") used digital animation as a test run.

"Barting Over", which aired February 16, 2003, was promoted as the show's milestone 300th episode by Fox. However, "The Strong Arms of the Ma" was the 300th episode to be broadcast. According to Ben Rayner of the Toronto Star, "It's very difficult to find a straight answer why milestone status has been bestowed on "Barting Over". Some rationalize that the 300 figure doesn't account for two early holiday specials, Fox maintains that there was some discrepancy between the original, scheduled broadcast date- deep in the heart of the ratings-mad February sweeps- and the number of episodes that were eventually aired leading up to it." "Barting Over" refers to the error when Marge tells Lisa "I can't count the number of times (Homer) has done something crazy like this." Lisa responds that it is 300, to which Marge replies that she "could have sworn it's been 302".

== Voice cast & characters ==
This season saw the return of voice actress Maggie Roswell, who had left the show during season 11 because of a contract dispute. It is also the last season to feature Jan Hooks voicing Manjula Nahasapeemapetilon. Simpsons co-creator James L. Brooks voices himself in an episode.

=== Main cast ===
- Dan Castellaneta as Homer Simpson, Grampa Simpson, Gil Gunderson, Mayor Quimby, Rich Texan, Sideshow Mel, Kodos, Groundskeeper Willie, Krusty the Clown, Barney Gumble, Yes Guy, Squeaky-Voiced Teen, Santa's Little Helper, Blue-Haired Lawyer, Arnie Pye, Louie, Count Dracula, Hans Moleman, Rabbi Krustofsky, Bill and various others
- Julie Kavner as Marge Simpson, Patty Bouvier and Selma Bouvier
- Nancy Cartwright as Bart Simpson, Ralph Wiggum, Nelson Muntz, Kearney Zzyzwicz, Todd Flanders, Database and various others
- Yeardley Smith as Lisa Simpson
- Hank Azaria as Moe Szyslak, Chief Wiggum, Officer Lou, Comic Book Guy, Professor Frink, Luigi Risotto, Captain McCallister, Bumblebee Man, Disco Stu, Carl Carlson, Raphael, Apu Nahasapeemapetilon, Superintendent Chalmers, Dr. Velimirovic, Snake, Drederick Tatum, Cletus Spuckler, Old Jewish Man, Duffman, Frank Grimes, Dr. Nick Riviera, Johnny Tightlips, Julio, Les Moore, Kirk Van Houten, Pyro and various others
- Harry Shearer as Ned Flanders, Kent Brockman, Lenny Leonard, Dr. Hibbert, Mr. Burns, Kang, Otto Mann, Principal Skinner, Rainier Wolfcastle, Reverend Lovejoy, Waylon Smithers, Judge Snyder, God, Legs, Marty, Dave Shutton, Officer Eddie and various others.

=== Recurring ===
- Pamela Hayden as Milhouse Van Houten, Jimbo Jones, Rod Flanders, Sarah Wiggum and various others
- Maggie Roswell as The Ghost of Maude Flanders, Helen Lovejoy, Luann Van Houten and various others
- Russi Taylor as Martin Prince and Sherri and Terri
- Tress MacNeille as Governor Mary Bailey, Cookie Kwan, Lindsey Naegle, Dolph Shapiro, Agnes Skinner, Brandine Spuckler, Booberella, Miss Springfield and various others
- Marcia Wallace as Edna Krabappel
- Karl Wiedergott as Capital City Goofball and additional characters
- Marcia Mitzman Gaven as Helen Lovejoy, Miss Hoover and various others ("Large Marge")

=== Guest cast ===
- Joe Mantegna as Fat Tony
  (3 episodes)
- Jane Kaczmarek as Judge Constance Harm
  (2 episodes)
- Elvis Costello, Mick Jagger, Lenny Kravitz, Tom Petty, Keith Richards, and Brian Setzer as themselves
  ("How I Spent My Strummer Vacation")
- Jan Hooks as Manjula Nahasapeemapetilon
  ("Large Marge")
- Burt Ward as Robin
  ("Large Marge")
- Adam West as Batman
  ("Large Marge")
- Baha Men as themselves
  ("Large Marge")
- David Lander as Squiggy
  ("Helter Shelter")
- Larry Holmes as himself
  ("Helter Shelter")
- Kelsey Grammer as Sideshow Bob
  ("The Great Louse Detective")
- Little Richard as himself
  ("Special Edna")
- Elliott Gould as himself
  ("The Dad Who Knew Too Little")
- Pamela Reed as Ruth Powers
  ("The Strong Arms of the Ma")
- Ken Burns as himself
  ("Pray Anything")
- Lisa Leslie as herself
  ("Pray Anything")
- Travis Barker as himself
  ("Barting Over")
- Tom DeLonge as himself
  ("Barting Over")
- Mark Hoppus as himself
  ("Barting Over")
- Tony Hawk as himself
  ("Barting Over")
- George Plimpton as himself
  ("I'm Spelling as Fast as I Can")
- James L. Brooks as himself
  ("A Star Is Born Again")
- Helen Fielding as herself
  ("A Star is Born Again")
- Marisa Tomei as Sara Sloane
  ("A Star is Born Again")
- Eric Idle as Declan Desmond
  ("'Scuse Me While I Miss the Sky")
- Scott Thompson as Grady
  ("Three Gays of the Condo")
- "Weird Al" Yankovic as himself
  ("Three Gays of the Condo")
- Terry W. Greene as Large Gay Military Man
  ("Three Gays of the Condo")
- David Byrne as himself
  ("Dude, Where's My Ranch?")
- Andy Serkis as Cleanie
  ("Dude, Where's My Ranch?")
- Jonathan Taylor Thomas as Luke Stetson
  ("Dude, Where's My Ranch?")
- Stacy Keach as Howard K. Duff VII
  ("Old Yeller-Belly")
- John Kassir as Various Animals
  ("Old Yeller-Belly")
- Steve Buscemi as himself
  ("Brake My Wife, Please")
- Jackson Browne as himself
  ("Brake My Wife, Please")

== Reception ==
Season 14 received generally positive reviews. High-Def Digest was positive recommending the set and writing "The show has numerous moments that make you laugh." and gave it 3.5/5 stars. Blu-ray.com also gave season 14 3.5/5 stars who thought "After rewatching all of it for the first time since this batch of episodes originally aired, I have to say—season fourteen has a pretty good laugh-per- minute ratio." Casey Broadwater also felt it was an improvement over the Scully seasons and season 13. Collider gave the season a B−. The reviewer thought "As far as the overall quality of the season, it isn't as consistently good as some earlier seasons but in the evolution of the show and the characters, it's solid.". Jackson Cresswell thought "C.E.D'oh" was the best of the season along with "Pray Anything" and "Brake My Wife, Please" while citing "Three Gays of the Condo", "Large Marge", and "Helter Shelter" as the worst. Ryan Keefer of DVD Talk gave it a 4/5 calling it "a good spot to start brushing up on things".

== Awards ==
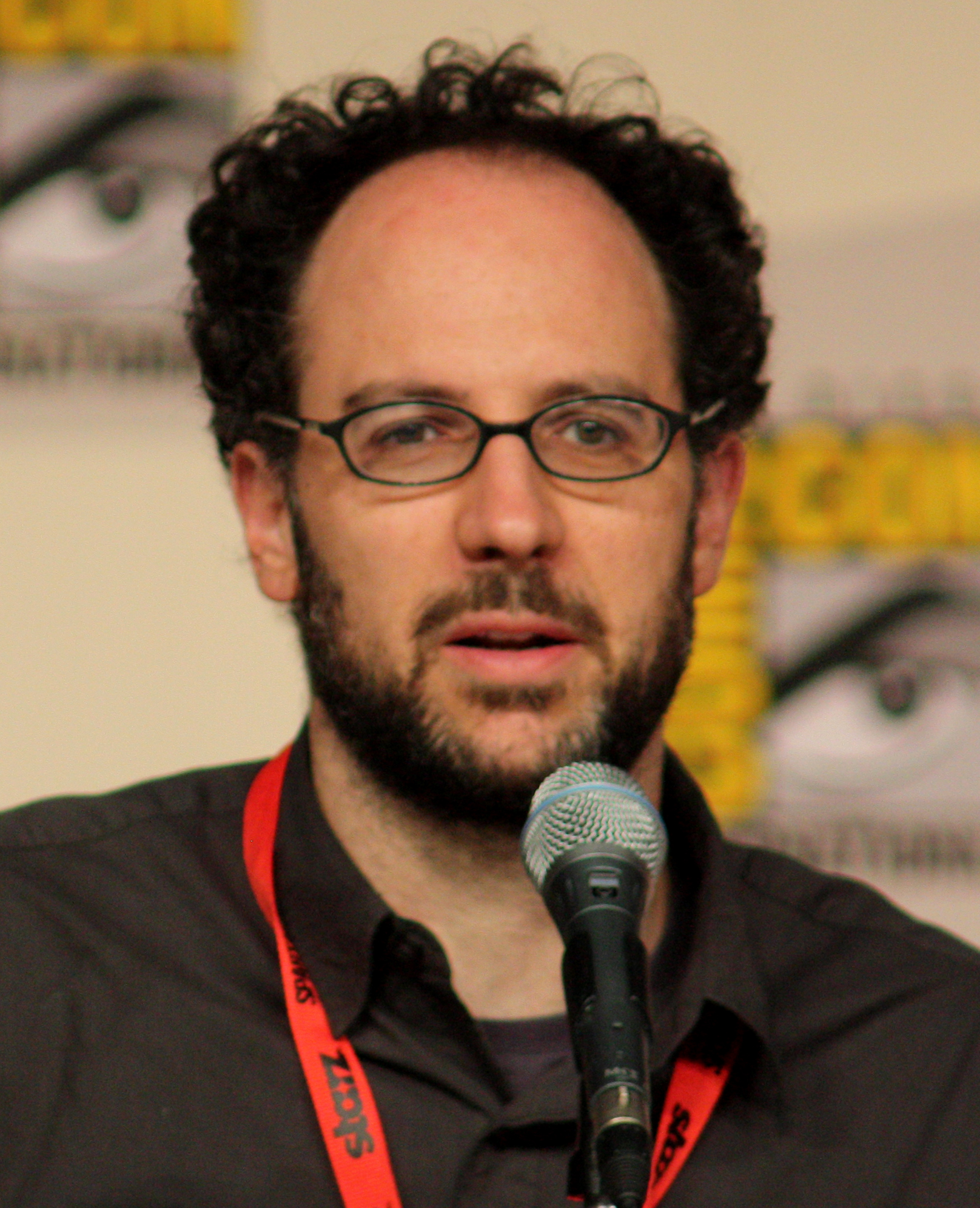
Matt Selman won a WGA Award for the episode "The Dad Who Knew Too Little".

Episodes of the fourteenth season won several awards, including two Primetime Emmy Awards. "Three Gays of the Condo" became the eighth episode of the series to win the Primetime Emmy Award for Outstanding Animated Program (For Programming less than One Hour). Hank Azaria won an Emmy Award for Outstanding Voice-Over Performance for voicing various characters in the episode "Moe Baby Blues". It was Azaria's third Emmy in that category. The song "Everybody Hates Ned Flanders" (music by Alf Clausen, lyrics by Ian Maxtone-Graham and Ken Keeler) from "Dude, Where's My Ranch?" received a nomination for the Emmy Award for Outstanding Individual Achievement in Music and Lyrics.

The show also won four Annie Awards, including its 12th consecutive in the Outstanding Achievement in an Animated Television Production category. The other awards won were Best Directing in an Animated Television Production (Steven Dean Moore for "'Scuse Me While I Miss the Sky"), Best Music in an Animated Television Production (Alf Clausen, Ken Keeler and Ian Maxtone-Graham for "Dude, Where's My Ranch?") and Best Writing in an Animated Television Production (Matt Warburton for "Three Gays of the Condo"). "The Dad Who Knew Too Little" (written by Matt Selman) won a Writers Guild of America Award in 2004 in the animation category. "Moe Baby Blues", written by J. Stewart Burns, was also nominated in the category.

The series was nominated for the Golden Globe Award for Best Musical or Comedy Series in 2003. It was the first time The Simpsons had been nominated for the award. The episode "'Scuse Me While I Miss the Sky", nominated for an Environmental Media Award for Best Television Episodic Comedy. Chris Ledesma was nominated for the Golden Reel Award for Best Sound Editing in Television Animation – Music for his work on "Large Marge".

== Episodes ==
No. overall	No. in season	Title	Directed by	Written by	Original release date	Prod. code	U.S. viewers (millions)
292	1	"Treehouse of Horror XIII"	David Silverman	Marc Wilmore	November 3, 2002	DABF19	16.67
292	1	"Treehouse of Horror XIII"	David Silverman	Brian Kelley	November 3, 2002	DABF19	16.67
292	1	"Treehouse of Horror XIII"	David Silverman	Kevin Curran	November 3, 2002	DABF19	16.67
The thirteenth Treehouse of Horror episode, consisting of three self-contained segments. Send in the Clones – Homer buys a hammock that can produce clones of himself. He creates numerous clones to help him around the house, but they soon overrun Springfield. The Fright to Creep and Scare Harms – Lisa petitions the town to get rid of their firearms after discovering the gravestone of a young man named William Bonney who died from gun violence. However, Lisa soon discovers that William Bonney is the real name of Western outlaw Billy the Kid, whose undead corpse, along with Frank James, Jesse James, the Sundance Kid, and Kaiser Wilhelm II, takes over the defenseless town. The Island of Dr. Hibbert – Dr. Hibbert invites the citizens of Springfield to his island resort, where he turns them into animals.
293	2	"How I Spent My Strummer Vacation"	Mike B. Anderson	Mike Scully	November 10, 2002	DABF22	12.51
A drunken Homer appears on the show Taxicab Conversations and rants about how awful his life as a husband and father is. Although his family is at first outraged, they realise that they do somewhat burden him and decide to make up for it by sending him to a Rock 'n Roll Fantasy Camp where he mingles with rock stars, including Mick Jagger and Keith Richards. The rock stars ask Homer to help out at a concert and, expecting that he will be allowed to perform, he accepts. Actually, they want him to test the microphones; however, a humiliated Homer grabs a guitar and starts playing. Guest stars: Mick Jagger, Keith Richards, Lenny Kravitz, Elvis Costello, Brian Setzer and Tom Petty.
294	3	"Bart vs. Lisa vs. the Third Grade"	Steven Dean Moore	Tim Long	November 17, 2002	DABF20	13.34
The Simpsons buy a satellite television, which Bart spends so much time watching that he does not study for an important achievement test. He scores so low that Principal Skinner demotes him to third grade, while Lisa does so well that she is moved up to third grade. The two are placed in the same class and become rivals. During a trip to Capital City, they get separated from their class and are forced to help each other in order to find their classmates.
295	4	"Large Marge"	Jim Reardon	Ian Maxtone-Graham	November 24, 2002	DABF18	17.38
Thinking Homer does not find her attractive anymore, Marge chooses to get liposuction, but instead receives breast implants. She becomes adored by many of the men in Springfield, and becomes a spokesmodel for trade shows. Meanwhile, Bart and Milhouse try to imitate a stunt they saw on an episode of Batman that guest stars Krusty the Clown. When the stunt ends badly, media watchdog groups blame Krusty, forcing the clown to make his show more safety-conscious and less fun. Guest stars: The Baha Men (Patrick Carey, Omerit Hield and Marvin Prosper), Jan Hooks, Adam West and Burt Ward.
296	5	"Helter Shelter"	Mark Kirkland	Brian Pollack & Mert Rich	December 1, 2002	DABF21	15.11
The Simpson family has to find temporary residence while their house is fumigated for termites. When they run out of options, they decide to become contestants on a reality show where families live in the manner that people did in 1895. The family is initially miserable, but slowly adapt to their new life, which causes the show to lose ratings. The producers decide to try to boost viewers by dumping the house in a river and forcing the family to survive in the wilderness. However, the Simpsons find a bunch of rejects from other reality shows and they attack the producers. Guest stars: Larry Holmes and David Lander. Note: This is the final aired episode to use traditional cel animation.
297	6	"The Great Louse Detective"	Steven Dean Moore	John Frink & Don Payne	December 15, 2002	EABF01	15.47
The Simpson family win a free spa weekend, and Homer is nearly killed when a mysterious figure locks him in a sauna. Chief Wiggum hires someone who can think like a murderer in order to find one. Bart's mortal enemy Sideshow Bob is sent to live with the Simpsons so he can help find Homer's attempted killer. Bob and Homer track down the attempted murderer and discover that it is Frank Grimes, Jr., the son of a man that Homer drove to insanity (in the season eight episode "Homer's Enemy"). After Grimes is arrested, Bob tries to kill Bart, but he finds that he has "grown accustomed to [his] face" and cannot harm him. Guest star: Kelsey Grammer.
298	7	"Special Edna"	Bob Anderson	Dennis Snee	January 5, 2003	EABF02	15.00
Ms. Edna Krabappel begins to lose faith in her relationship with Principal Skinner and becomes depressed. Bart wants to cheer her up and nominates her for the Teacher of the Year Award. Ms. Krabappel and the Simpsons are given a free trip to Epcot Center in Orlando, Florida. Skinner decides that he needs to do something to win Edna back, so he follows them there. He tries to sabotage Edna's chances of winning the award, in hopes that she will become so depressed that she will come back to him. However, he has a change of heart and proposes to her. Guest star: Little Richard.
299	8	"The Dad Who Knew Too Little"	Mark Kirkland	Matt Selman	January 12, 2003	EABF03	12.76
Homer disappoints Lisa on her birthday when he gives her a thoughtless present. He realizes that he knows little about her and hires private detective Dexter Colt to spy on her. Colt compiles a report, the information from which helps Homer bond with his daughter. However, Colt soon demands to be paid $1000, which Homer refuses. In retaliation, Colt vandalises an animal research lab and steals all the animals, leaving behind several clues that implicate Lisa. Homer and Lisa go on the run as fugitives and end up at a circus, where they meet Colt. He tries to kill Homer, but Lisa saves him. Later, Colt is arrested and Lisa exonerated. She finally receives the present she wanted from Homer. Guest star: Elliott Gould.
300	9	"The Strong Arms of the Ma"	Pete Michels	Carolyn Omine	February 2, 2003	EABF04	15.37
Marge gets mugged and becomes so traumatized that she develops agoraphobia. She hides in the basement. Having little else to do, she exercises with a weight set Homer bought from Rainier Wolfcastle's garage sale. She becomes so strong and confident that she is able to leave the basement. She continues working out and starts taking steroids so she can enter a bodybuilding competition. One night at Moe's Tavern she loses her temper and starts destroying the bar and fighting all of the patrons. Homer confronts Marge and says he misses the sweet woman that he married. Marge, horrified at what she has done, apologizes and agrees to stop working out. Guest star: Pamela Reed. Note: This is the show's 300th episode.
301	10	"Pray Anything"	Mike Frank Polcino	Sam O'Neal & Neal Boushell	February 9, 2003	EABF06	13.40
Homer becomes depressed when he sees that Ned Flanders seems to be better off than him. To remedy this, he begins to pray constantly. Meanwhile, the Simpsons discover that tree roots have clogged up their plumbing. The house becomes too run down to live in, and Homer prays for a solution. Homer is injured while attending church; he sues Reverend Lovejoy and is awarded the deed to the church. He throws a huge house-warming party, in which all of the partiers drink and engage in sinful activities. It suddenly starts raining and the town begins to flood. The townspeople flee to the roof of the church. Homer tries praying again but the flood keeps rising. Reverend Lovejoy returns in a helicopter and leads everyone in prayer, asking God to forgive them, and the rain stops. Guest stars: Lisa Leslie and Ken Burns.
302	11	"Barting Over"	Matthew Nastuk	Andrew Kreisberg	February 16, 2003	EABF05	21.31
Bart learns that he was once a child actor in commercials and that all the money earned was spent by Homer. In retaliation, Bart petitions the court to have himself legally emancipated from his parents and moves out of the Simpson house. Bart is initially miserable in his new apartment, but discovers that skateboarder Tony Hawk lives on one of the floors above. He and Hawk become friends, and Bart is content with his new life. Homer apologizes to Bart and requests that he return home. Bart accepts the apology, but tells his family that he is going on tour with Hawk. At an event, Homer speaks to Bart and finally promises Bart that he will never treat him badly again. Guest stars: Blink-182 (Travis Barker, Tom DeLonge and Mark Hoppus), Tony Hawk, and Jane Kaczmarek.
303	12	"I'm Spelling as Fast as I Can"	Nancy Kruse	Kevin Curran	February 16, 2003	EABF07	22.04
Lisa competes at a spelling bee and earns the right to compete in the Spell-lympics, becoming the pride of the town. The host of the show George Plimpton, asks her to intentionally lose so that a more popular boy can win. Lisa refuses and continues to compete, but accidentally misspells a word and loses. Meanwhile, Homer tours with a group obsessed with eating Krusty Burger's latest sandwich. Guest star: George Plimpton.
304	13	"A Star Is Born Again"	Michael Marcantel	Brian Kelley	March 2, 2003	EABF08	14.56
During the annual Jellyfish Festival, Ned Flanders realizes that he is lonely and becomes depressed. One night, he meets a beautiful woman, who asks him out on a date. He soon learns that the woman is Sara Sloane, a famous actress. Sloane is charmed by Flanders' wholesomeness, and they continue to date to the point at which she asks that he move to Hollywood. Flanders, worried that Hollywood would conflict with his conservative Christian values, refuses, so Sloane instead chooses to stay in Springfield. However, their relationship does not work out, due to his insistence on marriage. Guest stars: James L. Brooks, Helen Fielding and Marisa Tomei.
305	14	"Mr. Spritz Goes to Washington"	Lance Kramer	John Swartzwelder	March 9, 2003	EABF09	14.43
An air traffic route is redirected so that airplanes start flying directly over the Simpsons' house. The noise starts to disrupt their lives and, desperate for a solution, the family turns to their Congressman. However, he dies of a heart attack, so they ask Krusty the Clown to run for Congress so that he can help them. Krusty is successful in his campaign, but finds that his air traffic bill is ignored by the veteran Congressmen. He soon becomes disillusioned with the system, so the Simpsons, with guidance from Walter Mondale, help him out by blackmailing one of his opponents and attaching the bill to a more popular one. The bill passes, and the air traffic is re-routed. Guest star: Joe Mantegna.
306	15	"C.E.D'oh"	Mike B. Anderson	Dana Gould	March 16, 2003	EABF10	12.96
Homer tries for a promotion at Springfield Nuclear Power Plant and suggests several ideas to Mr. Burns, all of which are rejected. One night, Homer overhears Burns admit that the plant's real owner is a canary to protect Burns from responsibility for any wrongdoing by the power plant. Homer releases the bird and tells Burns that nuclear inspectors have arrived for a surprise inspection. Burns, desperate to find a scapegoat, names Homer the new owner. As his first act, Homer fires Burns and takes control of the Plant. However, he finds that his work life as a CEO is conflicting with his family life. Homer returns to his old job and gives ownership back to Burns.
307	16	"'Scuse Me While I Miss the Sky"	Steven Dean Moore	Dan Greaney & Allen Glazier	March 30, 2003	EABF11	12.56
A snobby British filmmaker named Declan Desmond begins making a documentary about student life at Springfield Elementary School. When introduced to Lisa, he tells her that she has too many goals and suggests that she pick one career. Lisa focuses on astronomy, but cannot watch the stars because of light pollution. She convinces Mayor Quimby to decrease the light's intensity during the night, which only results in an increase in the crime rate. Quimby bows to public pressure and switches the lights back on permanently. Lisa overloads the generators at the Power Plant, causing a power outage, and is able to watch a meteor shower undisturbed by light. Guest stars: Eric Idle and Joe Mantegna.
308	17	"Three Gays of the Condo"	Mark Kirkland	Matt Warburton	April 13, 2003	EABF12	12.02
While searching in his closet, Homer discovers an old letter from Marge that states that she no longer loves him. He begins to think that she only married him because she became pregnant and so moves out. He finds a new apartment in Springfield's gay district and moves in with a gay couple, Grady and Julio. Marge and Homer attempt a reconciliation dinner, but Homer becomes intoxicated and arrives late. Homer goes to Moe's Tavern, where he continues drinking and gets alcohol poisoning. At the hospital, Dr. Hibbert shows Homer a videotape that documents Homer's first alcohol poisoning. It shows Marge's compassion for the unconscious Homer, as she tells him she loves him. Back in the present, Marge comes into the hospital room and says that she still loves Homer and they kiss. Guest stars: "Weird Al" Yankovic, Ben Schatz and Scott Thompson.
309	18	"Dude, Where's My Ranch?"	Chris Clements	Ian Maxtone-Graham	April 27, 2003	EABF13	11.71
When challenged to think up a new Christmas carol, Homer instead writes a song about how much he hates Ned Flanders. The song becomes such a hit that the Simpsons become sick of hearing it and take a trip to a dude ranch. Lisa develops affection for a local boy named Luke but becomes jealous when he hears him talking to a girl named Clara on the telephone. One night, she meets Clara and gives her the wrong directions, leading her to become lost. After Lisa discovers that Clara is actually Luke's sister, she rushes to find her. She saves Clara, and tells Luke what happened, but he is offended and dumps her. Meanwhile, Bart and Homer decide to help a tribe of Native Americans who want a beaver dam removed so they can reclaim their land. Guest stars: David Byrne, Andy Serkis and Jonathan Taylor Thomas.
310	19	"Old Yeller-Belly"	Bob Anderson	John Frink & Don Payne	May 4, 2003	EABF14	11.59
The Simpson family's dog Santa's Little Helper fails to save Homer from a treehouse when it is on fire. Consequently, Homer declares him a coward and disowns him. One day, a photographer finds Santa's Little Helper playing with a Duff Beer can and takes a picture. The picture becomes popular and SLH becomes the new mascot for Duff Beer while the old mascot, Duffman, is fired. Homer earns a lot of money but SLH's original owner shows up, claiming that the dog is rightfully his. Bart fears that he will never see Santa's Little Helper again. The Simpsons conceive a plan to get Duffman rehired as Duff's mascot by showing what a coward Santa's Little Helper is. At a Duff-sponsored beach event, Homer pretends to be drowning (while floating on a keg of beer) but is attacked by a shark. The shark bites the beer keg and becomes drunk, and wins over the crowd on the beach. The shark is named the new mascot of Duff Beer and Santa's Little Helper returns to the Simpson family. Guest stars: Stacy Keach and John Kassir.
311	20	"Brake My Wife, Please"	Pete Michels	Tim Long	May 11, 2003	EABF15	10.56
Homer becomes obsessed with using new gadgets in his car. One day, he becomes distracted and drives off a pier, losing his driver's license. Unable to use a car, Homer starts to learn the joys of walking. Meanwhile, Marge shoulders the burden of Homer's driving duties and becomes stressed out. One day, as Homer sings about the virtues of walking, Marge accidentally runs him over with her car. Later, as Homer recuperates from the accident, he begins to suspect that Marge is trying to hurt him. They fight and go to see a marriage counselor. The counselor advises Homer to perform one completely unselfish gesture to win Marge back. Homer holds a party with all of her friends and a surprised Marge tells Homer that she loves him. Guest stars: Jackson Browne, Steve Buscemi and Jane Kaczmarek.
312	21	"The Bart of War"	Mike Frank Polcino	Marc Wilmore	May 18, 2003	EABF16	12.10
After destroying Flanders' shrine to The Beatles, Bart and Milhouse are punished by being put in community groups. Bart joins the Pre-Teen Braves along with Ralph Wiggum, Nelson Muntz and Database. Led by Marge, they start engaging in community activities. However, they soon become rivals with The Cavalry Kids, led by Milhouse. The two groups try to outdo each other and become involved in a contest to sell the most candy. The Cavalry Kids win the prize of singing the national anthem at a baseball game. However, the Pre-Teen Braves pretend to be The Cavalry Kids and sing their own version of the national anthem. As the crowd becomes enraged, the real Cavalry Kids arrive and a massive stadium-wide brawl erupts. Marge becomes upset, and the fighting ends when an image of her crying is shown on the JumboTron.
313	22	"Moe Baby Blues"	Lauren MacMullan	J. Stewart Burns	May 18, 2003	EABF17	13.44
Moe Szyslak becomes lonely and attempts to commit suicide by jumping off a bridge. However, he inadvertently saves Maggie Simpson when she is sent flying from the Simpsons' car window and into his arms. He starts playing with Maggie and becomes attached to her, telling her the story of The Godfather. Homer and Marge become upset about how much time Moe is spending with Maggie and forbid him from seeing her again. One night, Maggie wakes up and hears Fat Tony and the Springfield Mafia outside the house and follows them. When Homer and Marge find her missing, they automatically assume that Moe kidnapped her. When Moe is told that Maggie is missing, his request to help find her is granted by Homer. Maggie follows the mobsters to Luigi's restaurant, where Fat Tony's gang gets into a gun battle with a rival family. Homer, Marge and Moe track Maggie down and Moe goes inside and save Maggie. After Moe saves Maggie's life, Homer allows the two to spend more time together. Guest star: Joe Mantegna.

== Blu-ray and DVD release ==
The DVD and Blu-ray boxset for season fourteen was released by 20th Century Fox Home Entertainment in the United States and Canada on Tuesday, December 6, 2011, eight years after it had completed broadcast on television. As well as every episode from the season, the Blu-ray and DVD releases feature bonus material including deleted scenes, animatics, and commentaries for every episode. The boxart features Kang, and a special limited edition "embossed head case" package was also released.

The Complete Fourteenth Season
Set details			Special features
22 episodes; 3-disc set (Blu-ray); 4-disc set (DVD); 1.33:1 aspect ratio; AUDIO (DVD); English 5.1 Dolby Digital; Spanish 2.0 Dolby Surround; French 2.0 Dolby Surround; AUDIO (Blu-Ray); English 5.1 DTS HD Master Audio; Spanish 5.1 Dolby Digital; French 5.1 Dolby Digital; SUBTITLES; English SDH; Spanish			Introduction from Matt Groening; Optional commentaries for all 22 episodes; Animation showcases for "Moe Baby Blues"; Deleted scenes; Treehouse of Horror XIII; How I Spent My Strummer Vacation; Large Marge; Helter Shelter; The Great Louse Detective; Special Edna; the Strong Arms of the Ma; Pray Anything; Barting Over; A Star Is Born Again; Mr. Spritz Goes to Washington; 'Scuse Me While I Miss the Sky; Dude, Where's My Ranch?; The Bart of War; Special Language Feature; Three Gays and the Condo; Portuguese 2.0 Dolby Surround; Czech 2.0 Dolby Surround; German 2.0 Dolby Surround; Italian 2.0 Dolby Surround; Featurettes; It's Only Rock 'N' Roll; The 300th Episode; In the Beginning; The Halloween Classics; Foolish Earthlings; Sketch Galleries; Bonus Episodes (Blu-ray only); Treehouse of Horror V; Treehouse of Horror VI
Release dates
Region 1	Region 2	Region 4	
Tuesday, December 6, 2011	Monday, October 10, 2011	Wednesday, November 2, 2011	
