= The Bart of War =

- The Simpsons episode
- Promotional artwork
- Episode no.: Season 14; Episode 21
- Directed by: Mike Frank Polcino
- Written by: Marc Wilmore
- Production code: EABF16
- Original air date: May 18, 2003

Episode features
- Chalkboard gag: "Sandwiches should not contain sand"
- Couch gag: The Simpsons sit down as normal. A giant baby picks them up and plays with them.
- Commentary: Al Jean; Marc Wilmore; Matt Selman; Kevin Curran; J. Stewart Burns; Michael Price; Tom Gammill; Mike B. Anderson

Episode chronology
← Previous "Brake My Wife, Please"	Next → "Moe Baby Blues"
- The Simpsons season 14

"The Bart of War" is the twenty-first and penultimate episode of the fourteenth season of the American animated television series The Simpsons. It first aired on the Fox network in the United States on May 18, 2003. The episode was written by Marc Wilmore and directed by Mike Frank Polcino.

In this episode, Bart and Milhouse badly damage Ned Flanders' collection of Beatles memorabilia. Under adult supervision, they are then placed in separate youth groups, but the groups go to war. The episode received negative reviews.

== Plot ==
Marge disapproves of Bart and Milhouse watching South Park, so she unsuccessfully tries to get them to watch Good Heavens on PAX. The boys soon find themselves outside the house and bored, and decide to tie a thread to a fly. When the fly enters the Flanders house and is eaten by a cat, Bart and Milhouse find themselves inside the home, unsupervised. They take the opportunity to cause mischief, and discover Ned's collection of Beatles memorabilia in the basement. They drink from cans of a 40-year-old novelty beverage and start to hallucinate, with Bart seeing Milhouse as John Lennon through various stages of his life. When Ned, Rod and Todd return home and discover the damage caused by Bart and Milhouse, they flee to their panic room and call the police. Chief Wiggum and his crew subsequently catch the boys in the basement, and call their parents. They decide that Bart and Milhouse should spend all their time under parental supervision. Bart is also forbidden from playing with Milhouse, who Marge believes incites Bart into his bad behavior.

Marge subsequently establishes a peer group based on Native American life, called the "Pre-Teen Braves" — composed of Bart, Ralph Wiggum, Nelson Muntz, and Database, with herself as tribe leader after Homer fails in his leadership skills. Later, when Marge takes the boys on a nature walk, they meet Joe Proudfoot of the Mohican tribe who shows them a field that is in need of cleaning up. The Pre-Teen Braves agree to the job, but discover that it has already been cleaned by another peer group, the "Cavalry Kids" — led by Milhouse's father, Kirk Van Houten, composed of Milhouse, Martin Prince, Jimbo Jones, and a nerd named Cosine. The two groups try to outdo each other in doing good; for example, when the Cavalry Kids bulldoze the house of the homeless from the Pre-Teen Braves and post a pre-fabricated in place, the Pre-Teen Braves retaliate by setting it on fire with arrows. When the Cavalry Kids sell candy in the hope of becoming batboys at a Springfield Isotopes game, the Pre-Teen Braves try to thwart them by lacing their candy with laxatives. Unfortunately for them, the senior citizens, in need of relief from constipation, buy the Cavalry Kids a win.

At the Isotopes game, in another attempt to defeat the Cavalry Kids, Bart and Homer divert them away from the stadium with a fake "free VIP parking" sign, and the Pre-Teen Braves then disguise themselves as their enemies before singing their own version of "The Star-Spangled Banner". The crowd becomes angered by this, and when the real Cavalry Kids arrive, a fight breaks out between everyone. Marge, appalled by this, breaks down, and when this is shown on the Jumbotron, the fighting stops and the Sea Captain suggests that everyone should sing a sweet, soothing hymn like Canada's national anthem instead of a "hymn to war" like "The Star-Spangled Banner". Everyone present sings "O Canada" to Marge and joins hands to form a maple leaf on the baseball field. Bart and Milhouse then agree that war is not the answer — "except to all of America's problems."

== Cultural references ==
- The title is a play on Sun Tzu's The Art of War.
- At the start of the episode, Bart and Milhouse are seen watching South Park, as a response to the episode "Simpsons Already Did It".
- Milhouse mentions he feels like luge silver medalist Barbara Niedernhuber while riding Flanders' video cart.
- When the police catch Bart and Milhouse, Chief Wiggum says "It looks like a bunch of kids are taking the "Last Train to Clarksville"." Officer Lou tells a disgruntled Wiggum that this is a Monkees song rather than a Beatles one.
- Chief Wiggum questions the correct spelling of NSYNC, an American boy band.
- The Native American refers to the book and 1992 hit movie The Last of the Mohicans.
- While the Cavalry Kids and the Pre-Teen Braves compete, the song "One Tin Soldier" is heard in the soundtrack.
- While the townspeople sing "O Canada", Marge is shown holding both the Canadian flag and the provincial flag of Quebec, referring to the two official languages of Canada. The Simpsons airs in Quebec, with the English voices dubbed in Québécois French.
- Nelson thinking he is seeing his father in random things and saying "Papa?" while solemn violin music plays, is a reference to the film An American Tail.

=== Beatles references ===
- The artifact which reads "I'm fixing a hole...in my drywall!" is a tongue-in-cheek reference to the Beatles song "Fixing A Hole".
- The four flavors of "Beatles Soda" that Bart and Milhouse drink are "John Lemon", "Paul McIcedTea", "Orange Harrison" and "Mango Starr". The drinks that Bart and Milhouse drink are those of the two Beatles that had died.
- After seeing Milhouse as Lennon, Bart speaks the words "Yellow matter custard dripping from a dead dog's eye", a direct quote from the Beatles song "I Am the Walrus".
- When Bart and Milhouse try to escape but are soon caught, they are hiding in a cut-out model of the Yellow Submarine; this is preceded by dramatic incidental music similar to that used in the film.
- When Homer questions Ned's Beatles collection, Ned says they were bigger than Jesus. This is reference to John Lennon's controversial 1966 quote about the Beatles.
- Homer refers to Michael Jackson having bought the rights to the Beatles' library of music.
- The drum solo Homer performs during the first Pre-Teen Braves meeting is also the opening drum part of the song "Get Back" and in the middle of "The End", both by the Beatles.

== Reception ==
=== Viewing figures ===
The episode was watched by 12.10 million viewers, which was the 27th most-watched show that week.

=== Critical response ===
Colin Jacobson of DVD Movie Guide said it was "a pretty dull episode" but liked some of the jokes. He also thought that the plot "quickly drags".

On Four Finger Discount, Guy Davis thought the episode was disrespectful to multiple entities including the Beatles and Native Americans. Brendan Dando enjoyed the Beatles jokes but thought the episode took too much time to set up the Bart and Milhouse conflict.
