= Large Marge =

- The Simpsons episode
- Episode no.: Season 14; Episode 4
- Directed by: Jim Reardon
- Written by: Ian Maxtone-Graham
- Production code: DABF18
- Original air date: November 24, 2002

Guest appearances
- Jan Hooks as Manjula Nahasapeemapetilon; Marcia Wallace as Edna Krabappel; Burt Ward as Robin; Adam West as Batman; Baha Men as themselves

Episode features
- Couch gag: Homer (unseen, but implied to be him) draws the family on the couch with an Etch-a-Sketch (called a "Sketch-A-Etch" in the couch gag) and yells, "Whoo-hoo!" when he is done.
- Commentary: Al Jean; Ian Maxtone-Graham; Matt Selman; Tom Gammill; Matt Warburton; Nancy Cartwright; David Silverman; Mike B. Anderson

Episode chronology
← Previous "Bart vs. Lisa vs. the Third Grade"	Next → "Helter Shelter"
- The Simpsons season 14

"Large Marge" is the fourth episode of the fourteenth season of the American animated television series The Simpsons. It originally aired on the Fox network in the United States on November 24, 2002. In the episode, Marge decides to get liposuction, thinking that Homer no longer finds her attractive. However, she accidentally receives breast implants, so she becomes adored by many men in Springfield and becomes a model. Meanwhile, Bart and Milhouse try to imitate a stunt they saw on an episode of Batman that guest-starred Krusty the Clown. When the stunt ends badly, media watchdog groups blame Krusty, forcing the clown to make his show more safety-conscious and less fun.

This is the final episode to feature Jan Hooks as Manjula Nahasapeemapetilon before her death in October 2014.

== Plot ==
Lisa, Homer, and former presidents Jimmy Carter, Bill Clinton, and George H. W. Bush participate in a Habitat for Humanity project. While working, Homer takes off his wedding ring for safekeeping, causing Lindsay Naegle and Cookie Kwan to think Homer is a divorcé. Marge, driving by with Maggie, assumes Homer is flirting with the women and worries that Homer has lost interest in her. She decides to get liposuction on the advice of Manjula, but a mix-up at the hospital instead causes her to get breast implants meant for Mayor Quimby's assistant. Marge is forced to wait 48 hours before the implants can be removed.

Meanwhile, Bart and Milhouse watch an episode of Batman guest-starring Krusty and attempt to recreate a stunt, damaging school property and the U.S. flag. Upon discovering the two were influenced by Krusty, Principal Skinner leads a protest against the clown, now seen as a dangerous influence on children. Krusty's show is re-tooled to exclude anything considered dangerous and likely to be imitated by impressionable viewers.

After returning home from her surgery, Marge realizes that her new breasts are giving her difficulty in doing even the simplest tasks, but that the men of Springfield give her gifts and attention. When the family goes out for dinner, Kiki Highsmith, a trade show executive, approaches Marge and offers her a modeling job. Marge accepts and initially enjoys the experience, but is quickly plagued by back pain and harassment from the men of Springfield.

At the Springfield Shoe Expo, Marge is further humiliated while promoting shoe horns. At the same time, Bart decides to help Krusty win back his popularity by having him appear to rescue Milhouse from Stampy by shouting Stampy's safe word: "magumbo." When Krusty forgets the word, Stampy stuffs Milhouse and Bart in his mouth, and Homer tries to save them. The police prepare to shoot Stampy, endangering Homer, Bart and Milhouse, but Marge manages to distract the police by flashing her breasts. Krusty, ogling her breasts, shouts, "Look at those magumbos!" Stampy releases Bart, Milhouse, and Homer, and Krusty is hailed as a hero, and his popularity is restored in the town. Following the day's events, Marge finally has her implants removed.

== Production ==
"Large Marge" was written by Ian Maxtone-Graham and directed by Jim Reardon as part of the fourteenth season of The Simpsons (2002–03). In an Associated Press news report about the episode, it was cited as satirizing "plastic surgery and images of beauty in popular culture." Actors Adam West and Burt Ward, who starred in the television series Batman as Batman and Robin, respectively, guest starred in "Large Marge" as those characters. Junkanoo band Baha Men, known for their single "Who Let the Dogs Out?", recorded two parodies of that song for this episode: "Who Left the Milk Out?", which Marge and Maggie listen to on Radio Disney, and "Who Let Her Jugs Out?", which plays over the closing credits.

== Release ==
The episode originally aired on the Fox network in the United States on November 24, 2002. On February 7, 2006, "Large Marge" was released in the United States on a DVD collection titled The Simpsons Kiss and Tell: The Story of Their Love, along with the season nine episode "Natural Born Kissers," the season fourteen episode "Three Gays of the Condo", and the season fifteen episode "The Way We Weren't." All four episodes revolve around the romance between Homer and Marge.

On December 6, 2011, "Large Marge" was released on Blu-ray and DVD as part of the box set The Simpsons – The Complete Fourteenth Season. Staff members Al Jean, Ian Maxtone-Graham, Matt Selman, Tom Gammill, Matt Warburton, David Silverman, and Mike B. Anderson and cast member Nancy Cartwright participated in the DVD audio commentary for the episode. Deleted scenes from the episode were also included in the box set.

== Reception ==
Reviews from television critics about this episode have been mixed since the release of the Kiss and Tell DVD.

IGN's Jeff Otto commented that while he thought "Natural Born Kissers" was the only "great" episode in the compilation, "All four episodes are good Simpsons episodes." He added: "I can't figure why, if Fox was going to put together a set of this theme, they couldn't have included some of the more classic episodes about Marge and Homer's romance. Still, even the lesser Simpsons episodes are entertaining, so you could do worse."

A writer for HorrorNews.net called it one of the season's highlights, and Aaron Peck of High-Def Digest described it as "memorable." In his review of the Kiss and Tell DVD, Andy Dougan of the Evening Times characterized the episode as one of the "funniest episodes of recent series."

DVD Movie Guide's Colin Jacobson commented that though "the plot of 'Large' screams 'high concept', it works pretty well. It uses the silliness attached to Marge's chest to good comic effect, and the secondary plot with Bart and Krusty ties into things in a fun manner. It presents a lot of funny bits and turns into a strong episode. It's also hard to knock a show that reunites the voices of Adam West and Burt Ward."

While reviewing the fourteenth season of The Simpsons, Victor Valdivia of DVD Verdict wrote: "To be sure, there are some real clinkers this season. Both 'Large Marge' and 'Strong Arm of the Ma' prove that writing good episodes about Marge seems to be out of the question by this point. [...] By normal TV standards, these are not unwatchable, but by Simpsons standards, these are the episodes you probably won't watch repeatedly."
