= The Simpsons season 15 =

Season of television series

The Simpsons
- Season 15
- DVD cover featuring Otto Mann
- Showrunner: Al Jean
- No. of episodes: 22

Release
- Original network: Fox
- Original release: November 2, 2003 – May 23, 2004

Season chronology
- ← Previous; Season 14 Next → Season 16

The fifteenth season of the American animated sitcom The Simpsons aired on Fox between November 2, 2003, and May 23, 2004. The season was produced by Gracie Films and 20th Century Fox Television. Executive producer Al Jean remained the showrunner. The season contains five hold-over episodes from the fourteenth season (EABF) production line. The most watched episode had 16.2 million viewers and the least watched had 6.2 million viewers. The season was nominated for four Emmy Awards, winning one, and was nominated for five Writers Guild of America Awards, winning two. Season 15 was released on DVD and Blu-ray in Region 1 on December 4, 2012, Region 2 on December 3, 2012, and Region 4 on December 12, 2012.

== Voice cast & characters ==
=== Main cast ===
- Dan Castellaneta as Homer Simpson, Grampa Simpson, Kodos, Frankie the Squealer, Mayor Quimby, Sideshow Mel, Gil Gunderson, Blue-Haired Lawyer, Krusty the Clown, Squeaky-Voiced Teen, Santa's Little Helper, Groundskeeper Willie, Itchy, Barney Gumble, Snowball II, Hans Moleman, Yes Guy, Rich Texan, Mr. Teeny, Marty, and various others
- Julie Kavner as Marge Simpson, Patty Bouvier, and Selma Bouvier
- Nancy Cartwright as Bart Simpson, Nelson Muntz, Database, Todd Flanders, Kearney Zzyzwicz, Ralph Wiggum, and various others
- Yeardley Smith as Lisa Simpson
- Hank Azaria as Johnny Tightlips, Moe Szyslak, Professor Frink, Comic Book Guy, Lou, Chief Wiggum, Snake, Carl Carlson, Superintendent Chalmers, Cletus Spuckler, Disco Stu, Wiseguy, Drederick Tatum, Old Jewish Man, Luigi Risotto, Kirk Van Houten, Apu Nahasapeemapetilon, Dr. Nick, Duffman, Sea Captain, and various others
- Harry Shearer as Kang, Jasper Beardsley, God, Principal Skinner, Ned Flanders, Kent Brockman, Dr. Hibbert, Eddie, Mr. Burns, Judge Snyder, Lenny Leonard, Waylon Smithers, Dewey Largo, Otto Mann, Rainier Wolfcastle, Scratchy, Reverend Lovejoy, Dr. Marvin Monroe, Bill, and various others

=== Supporting cast ===
- Pamela Hayden as Milhouse Van Houten, Rod Flanders, Jimbo Jones, Patches, and various others
- Tress MacNeille as Agnes Skinner, Dolph Shapiro, Crazy Cat Lady, Mrs. Muntz, Manjula Nahasapeemapetilon. Cookie Kwan, Lindsey Naegle, Poor Violet, Brandine Spuckler, Booberella, and various others
- Maggie Roswell as Helen Lovejoy, Elizabeth Hoover, and Luann Van Houten
- Russi Taylor as Martin Prince, Üter Zörker, Sherri and Terri
- Karl Wiedergott as additional characters

=== Guest cast ===
Guest stars for the season included:

- Marcia Wallace as Edna Krabappel
- Glenn Close as Mona Simpson
- Jennifer Garner
- Jerry Lewis as Professor Frink Sr.
- Oscar De La Hoya as himself
- Tony Blair
- Ian McKellen
- J. K. Rowling
- Jackie Mason
- Jane Leeves
- Evan Marriott
- Simon Cowell
- Mr. T
- Michael Moore.
- Robert Stack was reported to be a guest star but did not appear.

== Episodes ==
No. overall	No. in season	Title	Directed by	Written by	Original release date	Prod. code	U.S. viewers (millions)
314	1	"Treehouse of Horror XIV"	Steven Dean Moore	John Swartzwelder	November 2, 2003	EABF21	16.23
Reaper Madness – Homer enjoys his new life as The Grim Reaper after killing the old one and plaguing the world with immortality, but becomes conflicted when Marge is next on his death list. Frinkenstein – Professor Frink wins the Nobel Prize in science, but is sad that his dead father is not with him to share in his success, so Frink rebuilds him out of his father's real body with mechanical parts, but the latter is not happy with this and he will steal the body parts of other corpses. Stop the World, I Want to Goof Off – Bart and Milhouse order a stopwatch from the back of a comic book that possesses the power to manipulate time. Guest star: Jerry Lewis, Dudley Herschbach, Jennifer Garner and Oscar De La Hoya
315	2	"My Mother the Carjacker"	Nancy Kruse	Michael Price	November 9, 2003	EABF18	12.38
Homer finds a hidden message in the newspaper asking to meet him finds that it is from Homer's mother, Mona. The police find them, and Mona is put on trial and is acquitted by the jury. She moves in with the Simpsons and makes up for missed time with Homer. Mr. Burns, seeking revenge for her previous acts, tricks her into committing a federal offense, and she is arrested. Homer helps her escape from the prison transport bus, but she subdues Homer to keep him safe before apparently dying in an explosion while driving away in the bus. Homer is comforted, thinking he found a message from Mona that "IMOK," missing her actual message that explains her survival and further escape. Guest star: Glenn Close
316	3	"The President Wore Pearls"	Mike B. Anderson	Dana Gould	November 16, 2003	EABF20	12.74
In this loose parody of the musical/movie Evita, Lisa is elected Student Body president. However, the school staff controls her by giving her a makeover so they can cut the school budget and use her as a scapegoat. When she learns what happened, she resigns and joins the students in a strike. To cripple the protest, Principal Skinner transfers Lisa to another school, but Homer returns her because of the extra commute time. The cuts are restored by selling cigarettes and eliminating flu shots. Guest star: Michael Moore
317	4	"The Regina Monologues"	Mark Kirkland	John Swartzwelder	November 23, 2003	EABF22	12.17
After making over $3000 from his own museum featuring a $1000 bill, Bart takes the family to London on the suggestion of Grampa to find a former lover. While driving in London, Homer collides with the Queen's carriage. At his trial, he insults the queen and is sentenced to death. Waiting for execution, he tries to escape but ends up in the queen's bedroom. He begs for forgiveness and the queen allows him to leave the country if he takes Madonna with him. Meanwhile, Grampa finds his former love and discovers he has a daughter, which prompts him to run away. Guest star: Tony Blair, J. K. Rowling, Ian McKellen, Jane Leeves and Evan Marriott
318	5	"The Fat and the Furriest"	Matthew Nastuk	Joel H. Cohen	November 30, 2003	EABF19	11.71
When Homer is forced to dispose of a giant ball of candy, he encounters a bear and cowers in fear, but it leaves him alone. A hunter captures the scene on camera, and Homer is humiliated when he appears on the news. To regain his dignity, he builds a suit of armor to confront the bear. He loses the battle with it but removes an electric prod from it, making it docile. Homer takes the bear to a wildlife refuge after giving it his armor to protect itself against hunters. Guest star: Charles Napier
319	6	"Today I Am a Clown"	Nancy Kruse	Joel H. Cohen	December 7, 2003	FABF01	10.50
Krusty discovers that he never had a bar mitzvah as a child. He quits his show to have it as an adult, with the help of his father, Rabbi Krustofsky. Meanwhile, Homer hosts a late-night talk show à la Politically Incorrect with Bill Maher as a replacement for Krusty's show. However, when he starts discussing meaningful topics at the suggestion of Lisa, it gets cancelled. To regain his popularity, Krusty televises his bar mitzvah, which disappoints his father, so he has a second traditional one to please him. Guest star: Jackie Mason and Mr. T
320	7	"'Tis the Fifteenth Season"	Steven Dean Moore	Michael Price	December 14, 2003	FABF02	11.28
Homer realizes how selfish he is after he spends all the family's Christmas money on a present for himself. Trying to change, he becomes the most charitable person in town, making Ned Flanders jealous. Lisa tells Homer that Buddhists believe that people would be happier without material possessions, so he steals the townsfolk's Christmas presents as his next good deed. When an angry mob comes for him, Flanders calms them down and gives back their presents.
321	8	"Marge vs. Singles, Seniors, Childless Couples and Teens, and Gays"	Bob Anderson	Jon Vitti	January 4, 2004	FABF03	12.00
When a concert for babies causes a riot, the town must take taxpayer money to cover the damage. A group of singles, seniors, childless couples, teens, and gays band together to protest having to accommodate families to force the town to remove anything that is child friendly. Marge takes up the cause for the families by placing an initiative on the ballot. With the petition likely to lose, Bart and Lisa form a plan to have the children hug the childless adults on election day, which gives them germ and makes them too sick to vote, and the petition passes.
322	9	"I, (Annoyed Grunt)-Bot"	Lauren MacMullan	Dan Greaney & Allen Glazier	January 11, 2004	FABF04	16.30
Homer is unable to assemble a bicycle for Bart, which embarrasses him in front of the bullies. To win Bart's respect, Homer builds a battle robot, which is actually Homer in a costume. When he enters the robot into a tournament, Homer reaches the final round despite his injuries. In the final battle, Bart discovers Homer, who wins his respect because of the injuries his sustained. When the robot ejects Homer from his suit, the robot stops because it was programmed not to harm people, so Homer wins. Meanwhile, Snowball II dies and Lisa tries to find a replacement cat, but they keep dying. When she finds a cat that survives, she names it Snowball V but will be called Snowball II to maintain the status quo.
323	10	"Diatribe of a Mad Housewife"	Mark Kirkland	Robin J. Stein	January 25, 2004	FABF05	10.63
Marge writes a romance novel with characters based on Homer as the villain and Ned Flanders as the hero that becomes a hit. Rumors spread that the novel is based on Marge's life. Meanwhile, Homer gets fired from the power plant again and becomes an ambulance driver. When Homer reads the novel, he chases Ned in his ambulance. He corners Ned but begs him to teach him how to be a good husband. Marge is relieved, and they write the next novel together. Guest star: Mary-Kate and Ashley Olsen, Thomas Pynchon and Tom Clancy
324	11	"Margical History Tour"	Mike B. Anderson	Brian Kelley	February 8, 2004	FABF06	8.87
When the local library proves to be useless for the kids' class project, Marge tells Milhouse, Bart, and Lisa three Simpsons-style historical accounts: Henry VIII's (Homer's) attempts at siring a son, Lewis and Clark (Lenny and Carl) exploring the USA's wilderness with Sacagawea (Lisa), and Salieri (Lisa again) out to ruin piano-playing virtuoso Mozart (Bart). Lisa notes that the last story is not accurate.
325	12	"Milhouse Doesn't Live Here Anymore"	Matthew Nastuk	Julie Chambers & David Chambers	February 15, 2004	FABF07	9.43
Milhouse moves away to Capitol City to live with his divorced mom. Without his friend, Bart bonds with Lisa, and they become best friends. Meanwhile, Homer goes into panhandling to buy anniversary gifts for Marge. A group of beggars become angry at Homer, and tell Marge what he is doing, but she does not return the gifts. Later, Milhouse returns to live with his father, and Bart goes back being friends with him and abandons Lisa. However, he gives Lisa a set of cards to do nice things for her as a token of appreciation. Guest star: Isabel Sanford, Nick Bakay, William Daniels, Dick Tufeld and Casey Kasem
326	13	"Smart & Smarter"	Steven Dean Moore	Carolyn Omine	February 22, 2004	FABF09	12.61
When Maggie does better than Lisa on an IQ test, Lisa becomes upset over no longer being the smart one and tries to lead Maggie astray. When Marge scolds her for this, Lisa hides in the Natural History Museum. The family comes looks for her, and everyone except Maggie becomes trapped in a human body exhibit. Lisa is able to get Maggie to release them after several tries. Later, they are shown a video in which Lisa subconsciously supplies answers to Maggie, which is why Maggie performed well on the IQ test. Guest star: Simon Cowell
327	14	"The Ziff Who Came to Dinner"	Nancy Kruse	Deb Lacusta & Dan Castellaneta	March 14, 2004	FABF08	10.67
The Simpsons go on a late-night attic search after Bart and Lisa, who are freaked out over a horror movie Homer let them watch, begin hearing voices and find Marge's ex-prom date Artie Ziff, who is on the run for cheating the shareholders of his company. The family allows Artie to stay with them, but Homer is arrested after he wins all of Artie's shares of his company in a game of poker. Marge kicks Artie out, but after encountering Selma and sleeping with her, he admits to being at fault, and Homer is freed. Guest star: Jon Lovitz
328	15	"Co-Dependents' Day"	Bob Anderson	Matt Warburton	March 21, 2004	FABF10	11.24
Bart and Lisa complain to Randall Curtis, a George Lucas-esque science fiction movie director, about his latest film. When they are not satisfied with his response, the family goes to Northern California to confront him where Homer and Marge's bond becomes stronger when they both get drunk on wine. Returning home, they continue to bond over drinking until Homer crashes the car while drunk and has a drunken Marge unknowingly take the blame. She gets sent to rehab, and is angered when Homer confesses. The other patients help Marge realize she likes Homer more than drinking, and she forgives him. Guest star: Brave Combo
329	16	"The Wandering Juvie"	Lauren MacMullan	John Frink & Don Payne	March 28, 2004	FABF11	10.52
Bart gets sent to juvenile hall after faking a wedding to keep the gifts from the wedding registry. He tries to be friendly with the girls but is threatened by a girl named Gina. At a dance, Bart is partnered with Gina, and when Gina escapes, Bart is forced to go with her since they are handcuffed together. When they are freed of the cuffs, Bart leaves but returns after hearing Gina cry. He tries to comfort her, but they fight until the police arrive. Gina admits the escape was her idea so that Bart does not face additional charges. Guest star: Sarah Michelle Gellar, Jane Kaczmarek and Charles Napier
330	17	"My Big Fat Geek Wedding"	Mark Kirkland	Kevin Curran	April 18, 2004	FABF12	9.21
After hearing that Skinner is getting cold feet about their wedding, Edna leaves Skinner at the altar. Homer tries to help Skinner win back Edna, and Marge tries to have Edna reconcile with Skinner but ends up have doubts about her own marriage. When returning a wedding gift to Comic Book Guy, they start bonding. When Skinner tries to woo Edna, he learns she and Comic Book Guy are in a relationship. The Simpsons and Skinner confront Edna and Comic Book Guy at a Sci-Fi convention where he proposes marriage. Edna chooses neither of them and leaves. Later, Homer asks to remarry Marge, and she accepts. Guest star: Matt Groening
331	18	"Catch 'em if You Can"	Matthew Nastuk	Ian Maxtone-Graham	April 25, 2004	FABF14	9.28
After a ruined movie night, thanks to Bart and Lisa, Homer and Marge take a vacation away from them, but decide to go to Miami instead of going to see an uncle. When Bart and Lisa learn that they went to Miami, Bart, Lisa, and Grampa go look for them. When Homer and Marge see that the children tracked them down, they leave with the kids in pursuit while Grampa finds companionship with an old man in Miami. The parents are caught at Niagara Falls, but the children feel guilty. They give them space but accidentally encounter Homer and Marge, who had left earlier. Running away, the parents end up in an inflatable castle that goes over the falls. The castle keeps them safe, and they have sex under the falls.
332	19	"Simple Simpson"	Jim Reardon	Jon Vitti	May 2, 2004	FABF15	9.51
When the Rich Texan humiliates Lisa at a contest, Homer retaliates by becoming "Pie Man", and throwing a pie at his face. He continues with the vigilante persona until he gets shot at one incident, and Lisa asks him to stop. However, he becomes Pie Man one more time to retaliate against Mr. Burns, and is caught. Burns blackmails him to be his personal hitman. When Homer is ordered to attack the Dalai Lama, he reveals himself to the world, but no one believes Homer could be him. Guest star: Nichelle Nichols
333	20	"The Way We Weren't"	Mike B. Anderson	J. Stewart Burns	May 9, 2004	FABF13	6.64
After Bart and Milhouse are caught playing spin the bottle with some girls, Homer recalls the story of his first kiss. At a boys camp where they were forced to work the kitchen at a girls camp, Homer agreed to a date with a girl he talked with on the other side of a wall. After hurting himself, he wore an eyepatch to the date, and Marge says that girl was her. Marge had burned her hair, so she went on the date with brown hair. On the date, they kissed and agreed to meet again the following night, but Homer never appeared. After leaving, Homer had an accident and ended up at a fat camp and could not escape in time. Marge left her camp broken-hearted, and Homer found half of a heart-shaped rock he had given her when he arrived. In the present, Homer shows Marge the rock to prove he cared while Marge shows him the other half, and they reconcile.
334	21	"Bart-Mangled Banner"	Steven Dean Moore	John Frink	May 16, 2004	FABF17	8.69
After receiving an injection from Dr. Hibbert, Bart becomes temporarily deaf, which makes him impervious to being bullied. During the playing of the national anthem at a donkey basketball game, Bart cannot hear it, and he accidentally moons the American flag during a prank gone wrong. Everyone in town to accuse the Simpsons of being unpatriotic, and when they try to explain themselves on a talk show, they are misinterpreted and imply that Springfield hates America. As the situation escalates, the Simpsons are arrested under the new "Government Knows Best" Act. The escape from prison and are brought to France on a freighter. Because they miss America, they return to the country as immigrants.
335	22	"Fraudcast News"	Bob Anderson	Don Payne	May 23, 2004	FABF18	9.40
Lisa is preparing to recite a poem in honor of a rock formation when it collapses and crushes Mr. Burns. When Burns survives and learns no one likes him, he buys out Springfield's media outlets to improve his image. Meanwhile, Marge tells to publish her poem, so she starts her own newspaper. When Lisa refuses to be bought out by Burns, he cuts off the power, so she publishes by hand. After Lisa is humiliated by Burns, she gives up but sees that other residents have started their own newspapers.

== Production ==
By January 2003, the series had been renewed through the sixteenth season. With this season, the series became the longest-running American primetime television sitcom, surpassing The Adventures of Ozzie and Harriet by number of seasons. Al Jean remained as showrunner, a role he had since the thirteenth season. The season had five holdover episodes from the previous season's EABF production line.

This season featured the final episodes of the series written by John Swartzwelder and the first episodes of the series written by Michael Price. It also featured the only episodes written by Robin J. Stein and Julie and David Chambers.

== Reception ==
=== Critical response ===
On review aggregator site Rotten Tomatoes, the season has an 80% approval rating based on 5 reviews. High Def Digest gave a rating of 4 stars, writing "The Simpsons' is one of only a handful of shows that I know I'm guaranteed to laugh out loud at least once an episode (usually more). Even though the cutting wit of the first decade lost its edge a bit, I still find 'The Simpsons' an extremely enjoyable way to spend my time. There aren't many things that are better than sitting down with a new season of 'The Simpsons' on Blu-ray and watching every episode back to back as fast as I possibly can. While the episodes sort of blend together, the humor is still there, and I still end up having quite a few genuine laughs". CraveOnline rated the season 8.5/10, noting "Some 'Simpsons' fans gave up during a perceived rough patch around season 12, and boy have they missed out. Season 13 was a particular favorite of mine, but now we're over the hump on the DVD releases. Season 15 is kind of a sweet spot, because it's got some highlight episodes I love, but also plenty that I don't remember." DVDActive said "The Simpsons season 15 isn't one of the series' best, but I'm pretty sure it isn't one of the worst either". ScreenJabber gave a rating of 4 stars, writing "Imagine my surprise when I sat down to review Season 15...and realised that I had never seen most of its episodes. Imagine, then, my joy at being able to enjoy almost 22 episodes of factory-fresh Simpsons, even though they were made about a decade ago. And even though some of the cultural references are a little dated, there's still an awful lot to laugh at and enjoy here. As always, this season of The Simpsons features a stellar line-up of guest stars. And, as always, there are some standout episodes. All in all, a more than decent season of this long, long-running show." DIY wrote "While Season 15 of The Simpsons may not be golden from start to finish it has a higher great to soggy episode ratio than more recent seasons. In fact, there are some real gems amongst the 22 episodes". Boxofficebuz gave it 4 stars, and said "...Throw in flashback episode 'The Way We [Weren't],' Pie-Man antics in 'Simple Simpson' and a Catch Me If You Can spoof in 'Catch 'Em If You Can,' you have a solid, solid season. A definite uptick over the previous couple seasons". Bubbleblabber rated it 9.0 out of 10, and concluded "In terms of the content, Season 15 was a highly underrated season for The Simpsons and brought along a number of now well-known classics". ‘’DVD Movie Guide’’ gave the season a B, and wrote "Should viewers expect greatness from Season 15 of The Simpsons? No, as the year comes with some mediocre shows. Still, it delivers a reasonable number of good episodes and seems worthwhile overall...S15 won't win over new fans, but it's usually fun".

=== Nielsen ratings ===
The season ranked 42 in the seasonal ratings below its repeat timeslot at 36. The average viewership was 10.59 million viewers.

=== Awards and nominations ===
At the 56th Primetime Emmy Awards, Dan Castellaneta won the Primetime Emmy Award for Outstanding Voice-Over Performance for his roles in "Today I Am a Clown". "The Way We Weren't" was nominated for the Primetime Emmy Award for Outstanding Animated Program (for programming less than one hour). Composer Alf Clausen was nominated for the Primetime Emmy Award for Outstanding Music Composition for a Series (Original Dramatic Score). Clausen and Dana Gould were nominated for the Primetime Emmy Award for Outstanding Original Music and Lyrics.

At the 57th Writers Guild of America Awards, Ian Maxtone-Graham won the Writers Guild of America Award for Television: Animation for his script for "Catch 'em if You Can". Don Payne won the Paul Selvin Award for "Fraudcast News". In addition, he was also nominated for the Writers Guild of America Award for Television: Animation for that episode along with the writers for the episodes "Today I Am a Clown" and "Milhouse Doesn't Live Here Anymore". Michael Price was nominated for the same award for "My Mother the Carjacker" at the 56th Writers Guild of America Awards.

At the 14th Environmental Media Awards, "The Fat and the Furriest" won the award for Television Episodic Comedy.

== Home media ==
The DVD and Blu-ray boxset for season fifteen was released by 20th Century Fox Home Entertainment in the United States and Canada on Tuesday, December 4, 2012, eight years after it had completed broadcast on television. As well as every episode from the season, the Blu-ray and DVD releases feature bonus material including deleted scenes, animatics, and commentaries for every episode. The boxart features Otto Mann, and a special limited edition "embossed head case" package was also released.

The Complete Fifteenth Season
Set details			Special features
22 episodes; 3-disc set (Blu-ray); 4-disc set (DVD); 1.33:1 aspect ratio; AUDIO (DVD); English 5.1 Dolby Digital; Spanish 2.0 Dolby Surround; French 2.0 Dolby Surround; AUDIO (Blu-Ray); English 5.1 DTS HD Master Audio; Spanish 5.1 Dolby Digital; French 5.1 Dolby Digital; SUBTITLES; English SDH; Spanish			Introduction from Matt Groening; Optional commentaries for all 22 episodes; Animation showcases for "The Wandering Juvie"; Deleted Scenes; Treehouse of Horror XIV; My Mother the Carjacker; The President Wore Pearls; The Regina Monologues; Marge vs. Singles, Seniors, Childless Couples and Teens, and Gays; Diatribe of a Mad Housewife; The Wandering Juvie; My Big Fat Geek Wedding; Simple Simpson; Bart-Mangled Banner; Special Language Feature; My Big Fat Geek Wedding; Portuguese 2.0 Dolby Surround; German 2.0 Dolby Surround; Italian 2.0 Dolby Surround; Ukrainian 2.0 Dolby Surround; Featurette; The Unusual Ones; Living in the Moment; Sketch Galleries; Commercials; Ritz Bits - Smart Trade; MasterCard; Bonus Episodes (Blu-ray only): The Otto Show; Das Bus; It's a Mad, Mad, Mad, Mad Marge
Release dates
Region 1	Region 2	Region 4	
Tuesday, December 4, 2012	Monday, December 3, 2012	Wednesday, December 12, 2012	
