= Milhouse Doesn't Live Here Anymore =

- The Simpsons episode
- Episode no.: Season 15; Episode 12
- Directed by: Matthew Nastuk
- Written by: David Chambers; Julie Chambers
- Production code: FABF07
- Original air date: February 15, 2004

Guest appearances
- Nick Bakay as Salem Saberhagen; William Daniels as KITT; Isabel Sanford as herself; Dick Tufeld as Robot; Marcia Wallace as Edna Krabappel

Episode features
- Couch gag: The couch is replaced with a plot of dirt. A gardener tosses some seeds in the plot of dirt and waters it. The Simpsons sprout from the ground.
- Commentary: Al Jean; David Chambers; Julie Chambers; Matt Selman; Tim Long; Tom Gammill; Joel H. Cohen; Mike B. Anderson; Valentina L. Garza

Episode chronology
← Previous "Margical History Tour"	Next → "Smart & Smarter"
- The Simpsons season 15

"Milhouse Doesn't Live Here Anymore" is the twelfth episode of the fifteenth season of the American animated television series The Simpsons. It originally aired on the Fox network in the United States on February 15, 2004. The episode was written by David and Julie Chambers and was directed by Matthew Nastuk.

In this episode, Bart becomes depressed when Milhouse moves away, so he bonds with Lisa while Homer begs for money to buy gifts for Marge. Actress Isabel Sanford appeared as herself while Nick Bakay, William Daniels, and Dick Tufeld reprised their roles from other television series. The episode received positive reviews.

== Plot ==
During a school field trip to the Museum of Television and TV, Bart notices a change in Milhouse's behavior. Milhouse talks back to Mrs. Krabappel and wanders away from the group. He causes mischief with Bart, and tells him that he does not care what anyone thinks of him anymore. Finally, Milhouse reveals that he is moving to Capitol City with his mother. Bart visits Milhouse in Capitol City, only to find that Milhouse has dyed his hair blond, is wearing fashionable clothes, and is cultivating a "bad-boy" image, even going so far as to give Bart a wedgie in front of his new Capitol City friends. At home, seeing how depressed Bart is, Marge suggests he spend more time with Lisa. The two begin to bond by washing the car and riding bikes, and after they discover an Indian burial mound together, they become best friends.

Meanwhile, at Moe's Tavern, Apu and Manjula are celebrating their anniversary, and Homer realizes he does not have a gift for Marge for their anniversary. After being thrown out of the bar, Homer sits on the street and people start giving him money. He dances and earns enough money to buy Marge some flowers. He also does a rendition of the song "Mr. Bojangles" and asks for money. Homer continues his panhandling, and eventually makes enough money to buy Marge a pair of diamond earrings. When he continues panhandling afterward, angry homeless people bring Marge to see what Homer is doing. Marge is mortified and angry, but cannot bring herself to throw the earrings away.

Milhouse returns to Springfield when his father wins custody of Milhouse via court order. After she finds out Bart told Milhouse about their secret Indian burial mound, Lisa feels that Bart is acting like their friendship never existed and that he has been using her to fill a void. Bart, however, shows her that he still values her as a sister by giving her a set of cards with nice things he will do for her on them, and the two hug. Zooming out to a video being played at the Museum of Television and TV, Isabel Sanford demonstrates how this ending is an example of how sitcoms end with a sentimental moment.

== Production ==
Actress Isabel Sanford appeared as herself in her final performance to air before her death. When recording her lines, Sanford questioned why producer Marc Wilmore, who was known to do an impression of her character Louise Jefferson, was not performing her part. Nick Bakay reprised his role as the cat Salem Saberhagen from the television series Sabrina the Teenage Witch. William Daniels reprised his role as KITT from the television series Knight Rider. Daniels previously reprised this role in the tenth season episode "The Wizard of Evergreen Terrace" because The Simspons was his son's favorite show. Dick Tufeld reprised his role as Robot from the television series Lost in Space.

== Reception ==
=== Viewing figures ===
The episode was watched by 9.43 million viewers, which was the 49th most-watched show that week.

=== Critical response ===
Colin Jacobson of DVD Movie Guide said it was an "above-average episode" and liked both the main plot and subplot.

On Four Finger Discount, Guy Davis and Brendan Dando enjoyed the Bart and Lisa plot and highlighted the character moment with Bart and the cards. They did not like the subplot with Homer panhandling.

In 2015, Drew Mackie of People named the episode as one of the 25 episodes of the series that "go for the heart".

In 2021, Hannah Saab of Screen Rant named the episode as one of the 10 best episodes featuring Milhouse.

=== Awards and nominations ===
David and Julie Chambers were nominated for a Writers Guild of America Award for Outstanding Writing in Animation at the 57th Writers Guild of America Awards for their script to this episode.
