= Treehouse of Horror XIV =

- The Simpsons episode
- Promotional art for the first segment featuring Homer as Death
- Episode no.: Season 15; Episode 1
- Directed by: Steven Dean Moore
- Written by: John Swartzwelder
- Production code: EABF21
- Original air date: November 2, 2003

Guest appearances
- Oscar De La Hoya as himself; Jennifer Garner as herself; Dudley Herschbach as himself; Jerry Lewis as Professor Frink Sr.

Episode features
- Commentary: Al Jean; Ian Maxtone-Graham; Matt Selman; Michael Price; Tom Gammill; Max Pross; Matt Warburton; Steven Dean Moore; Mike B. Anderson; David Silverman

Episode chronology
← Previous "Moe Baby Blues"	Next → "My Mother the Carjacker"
- The Simpsons season 15

"Treehouse of Horror XIV" is the first episode of the fifteenth season of the American animated television series The Simpsons. It originally aired on the Fox network in the United States on November 2, 2003. In the fourteenth annual Treehouse of Horror episode, Homer takes on the role of the Grim Reaper ("Reaper Madness"), Professor Frink creates a Frankenstein-version of his deceased father ("Frinkenstein") and Bart and Milhouse obtain a time-stopping watch ("Stop the World, I Want to Goof Off"). It was written by John Swartzwelder and directed by Steven Dean Moore. Guest stars in the episode include Jerry Lewis, whose character in The Nutty Professor served as the inspiration for recurring Simpsons character Professor Frink, as Frink's father, and Jennifer Garner, Dudley Herschbach, and Oscar De La Hoya as themselves. The episode was nominated for the 2004 Emmy Award for Outstanding Music Composition for a Series (Dramatic Underscore).

It is also the final Treehouse of Horror episode to play the traditional paced organ variant of the Simpsons theme at the end credits.

== Plot ==
=== Introduction ===
Bart and Lisa, dressed as Charlie Brown and Lucy van Pelt, respectively, from the Peanuts series, discuss their Halloween treats, and Bart claims that Lisa's are better than his. The two then fight violently until Homer intervenes and orders them to stop fighting. He throws a burning log at them, but misses and hits Grampa, setting him on fire, though he complains that he's "still cold".

Homer gets Bart and Lisa rolled up in the rug and starts to "beat the lumps". A gun-wielding Marge intervenes and says that she does not approve of Homer's parenting techniques, and shoots him. Homer's blood splatters on a nearby wall, spelling the title of the episode. Meanwhile, from their spaceship, the two aliens Kang and Kodos criticize the Simpson family for airing a Halloween special in November, as they are already set up for Christmas.

=== Reaper Madness ===
The Grim Reaper enters the Simpson house attempting to take Bart, but the family goes on a Benny Hill-style chase to elude him. Death eventually manages to pin Bart's shirt to the wall with his scythe. As Death is about to sentence Bart to an eternity of pain, Homer kills him by cracking his skull open with a bowling ball in revenge for the deaths of Snowball I and President John F. Kennedy. The Simpsons find that no one can die since Death is dead. The scene cuts to two examples of a world where no one can die: Frankie the Squealer (last seen in "Insane Clown Poppy") surviving an execution by the Springfield Mafia, much to their frustration, and Moe attempting to hang himself from the ceiling of his tavern. On trash day, Marge tells Homer to take Death's corpse to the curb. Homer does, but puts on Death's robe, inadvertently turning himself into the new Grim Reaper. At first, he refuses to reap souls, but when the cloak begins to crush his groin, he complies.

He kills many people who are on God's list (and some who are not), until he is asked to kill Marge. Homer does not want to kill his wife (or himself, an alternative he is given but quickly rejects), and pleads with God that he wants to get out of the job after leading Him to believe that he killed Marge. God agrees, but he finds that Homer tricked him by substituting Patty's body (which God initially mistakes for Selma's) for Marge's. The annoyed deity tries to punish Homer, but gives up after a chase, proclaiming that he is "too old and too rich". Marge thanks Homer by giving him extra pork chops. Homer then jokes that he will make sure to not kill Marge every week from now on.

=== Frinkenstein ===
In a parody of the 1931 film Frankenstein, Homer gets a call from the Royal Swedish Academy of Sciences telling him that he is the winner of the Nobel Prize; however, Lisa learns that it is actually for Professor Frink for his invention of a combined hammer and screwdriver. Frink is depressed because his father, an adventurer, had a falling out with him and died from a shark bite before they could reconcile. Frink, who kept the corpse frozen, reanimates his father. Unfortunately the revived Frink Sr. decides to steal body parts in order to improve himself. Eventually, Lisa convinces him to stop when he realizes he is causing his son anguish.

At the awards ceremony in Stockholm, Frink Sr. tries to make amends with his son for his recent behavior; however, he goes on another rampage through the audience, killing many and taking their brains. Frink Jr. manages to stop his father by kicking him in the crotch, fatally wounding him. Before dying, Frink Sr. is proud of his son for standing up to him. However, Frink Jr. is able to hold on to his father's soul, which talks to him from a box.

=== Stop the World, I Want to Goof Off ===
In a parody of the 1963 Twilight Zone episode "A Kind of a Stopwatch", Bart and Milhouse get a stopwatch through an advertisement in an old comic book that actually allows them to stop time. Realizing the power behind the watch, they set off to prank Springfieldians with impunity, such as giving Principal Skinner a pantsing and stealing Homer's donuts and clothes. They have a blast using the watch to terrorize the town, but they are eventually outsmarted by Mayor Quimby, who laid an ultraviolet powder on the floor at the town meeting where they committed their most recent joke. Upon discovering the perpetrators, a lynch mob goes after Bart and Milhouse. Just as the mob is about to converge on them, the boys use the watch to freeze time once again. The watch then breaks, leaving the two in a frozen world.

For a time, they have some fun with the entire world (such as giving the Pope a wedgie and punching Oscar De La Hoya in the stomach), but soon become bored. They find an 8-hour-long watch repair manual, but it takes the two 15 years to repair the device. Just before they re-activate the watch, and realizing that they need a scapegoat to avoid the lynch mob's wrath, they place Martin in the middle of the mob that was about to attack them; he is subsequently beaten up when time restarts. Later, Lisa makes light of the fact that Bart is much older, and asks to play with the watch. She finds a secondary function that changes reality, altering the family in many ways (including causing them to switch genders, and become bobble-heads, TV Guides and the Fantastic Four). Homer has her stop when the family, now normal with Bart at 10 years old again, is playing with hula hoops.

== Production ==
Jerry Lewis guest starred as the father of Professor Frink. Boxer Oscar De La Hoya appeared as himself. Actress Jennifer Garner appeared as herself. Chemist Dudley R. Herschbach appeared as himself.

== Reception ==
In the July 26, 2007 issue of Nature, the scientific journal's editorial staff listed the "Frinkenstein" segment among "The Top Ten science moments in The Simpsons", writing that "chemistry Nobel prizewinner Dudley Herschbach appears on the show to present Professor Frink with a Nobel prize of his own. Herschbach won the prize for crossed-molecular-beam techniques with which to study in detail the dynamics of chemical reactions. Frink is rewarded for inventing a hammer with a screwdriver attached." Screen Rant called it the best episode of the 15th season.

The episode was nominated for the 2004 Emmy Award for Outstanding Music Composition for a Series (Dramatic Underscore).
