= Diatribe of a Mad Housewife =

- The Simpsons episode
- Episode no.: Season 15; Episode 10
- Directed by: Mark Kirkland
- Written by: Robin J. Stein
- Production code: FABF05
- Original air date: January 25, 2004

Guest appearances
- Tom Clancy as himself; Thomas Pynchon as himself; Mary-Kate and Ashley Olsen as themselves

Episode features
- Couch gag: The Simpsons' heads pop out of a slice of apple pie. Homer takes a bite out of the pie.
- Commentary: Al Jean; Ian Maxtone-Graham; Matt Selman; Michael Price; Tom Gammill; Max Pross; Matt Warburton; David Silverman; Mike B. Anderson; Steven Dean Moore

Episode chronology
← Previous "I, (Annoyed Grunt)-Bot"	Next → "Margical History Tour"
- The Simpsons season 15

"Diatribe of a Mad Housewife" is the tenth episode of the fifteenth season of the American animated television series The Simpsons. It originally aired on the Fox Network in the United States on January 25, 2004. The episode was written by freelance writer Robin J. Stein and directed by Mark Kirkland.

In the episode, Marge is inspired to write a romance novel, though after Homer hears rumors that Marge is secretly in love with Ned Flanders due to the storyline of the novel, he grows jealous. Meanwhile, Homer buys an ambulance and becomes an ambulance driver.

== Plot ==
Homer is fired from his job at the Springfield Nuclear Power Plant after he crashes his car through the security gate and slams into Mr. Burns' office, seriously injuring a Federal nuclear safety worker in the process. Homer attempts to become a used car salesman but ends up purchasing a 60s ambulance and deciding on a free-lance EMT career instead. Meanwhile, Marge is inspired to write a novel after a visit to a bookstore and begins to write about whaling times. The main characters in Marge's novel are inspired by herself, Homer (who is the boorish villain), and the heroic and alluring Ned Flanders, while romance is the central theme; she had originally intended for the Homer-inspired character to be the romantic hero, but was dissuaded when Homer asked her to use the computer to take down a dinner order. She completes the book, titled The Harpooned Heart, and after it receives positive reviews, she decides to get it published. Helen Lovejoy soon begins to spread rumors that the novel is based on Marge's life.

After Homer is teased by several people, who imply that Ned is Marge's secret love, Homer decides to read the book. However, after falling asleep on page one and lying to Marge that he had read the book and approved of it, he listens to the audiobook version (read by the Olsen Twins). After arguing with Marge about his portrayal, Homer decides to confront Ned. Lisa tells Bart that she fears that Homer and Ned's altercation may end the same way as The Harpooned Heart, in which Homer's character killed Ned's when he learned Ned had impregnated Marge, only for the Homer-manque to be drowned by a whale. When Ned flees, Homer chases him in his ambulance. Ned fears Homer will kill him, but to his shock Homer drops to his knees and begs Ned to teach him how to be a good husband. Marge arrives in a panic but is relieved that Homer and Ned are speaking. Homer declares that the book was a wake-up call for him. Homer and Marge then decide to create a novel, titled "Who Really Killed JFK", though they start over when Homer concludes that Lee Harvey Oswald "set out to steal the Jack Ruby."

== Production ==
In the episode, reclusive author Thomas Pynchon has a cameo "appearance", his face hidden by a paper bag with a question mark on it. This is intended to satirise the author's "own carefully crafted anonymity". His appearance on The Simpsons was "his only sanctioned authorial image in decades". He later appeared in the sixteenth season episode "All's Fair in Oven War".

Dr. Marvin Monroe appears in this episode. He had not been seen since early seasons. Harry Shearer, who plays him, did not like doing the voice as it hurt his throat. The character had been subtly suggested to be dead and mentions in this episode that he has just "been very sick".

The Psychology of the Simpsons: D'oh! cites a section of dialogue from the episode to illustrate its point that "Homer and Marge don't seem to be very good at communicating before making important decisions".

== Critical reception ==
DVD Movie Guide commented that the episode over-explained a decent joke – about Moby-Dick – making it lose its funniness. The site added that "'Diatribe' takes two lackluster premises to combine into a forgettable show". In 2009, The A.V. Club included the episode in its list of "10 Simpsons episodes from the past 5 seasons that stand among the series’ best." The article commended Robin J. Stein's writing as well as Pynchon's and the Olsen twins' cameos while pointing out the episode "travels a well-worn path in the Simpsons story arc."
