= I, (Annoyed Grunt)-Bot =

- The Simpsons episode
- Episode no.: Season 15; Episode 9
- Directed by: Lauren MacMullan
- Written by: Dan Greaney; Allen Glazier
- Production code: FABF04
- Original air date: January 11, 2004

Episode features
- Couch gag: The couch is a white cake and the Simpsons are squeezed out like frosting on top of it.
- Commentary: Matt Groening; Al Jean; Allen Glazier; Matt Selman; Michael Price; Tom Gammill; Max Pross; Matt Warburton; Nancy Cartwright; Lauren MacMullan; Alan Sepinwall

Episode chronology
← Previous "Marge vs. Singles, Seniors, Childless Couples and Teens, and Gays"	Next → "Diatribe of a Mad Housewife"
- The Simpsons season 15

"I, (Annoyed Grunt)-Bot", also known as "I, D'oh-Bot", is the ninth episode of the fifteenth season of the American animated television series The Simpsons. It originally aired on the Fox network in the United States on January 11, 2004. The episode was written by Dan Greaney and Allen Glazier and was directed by Lauren MacMullan.

In this episode, Homer pretends to be a battle robot to make Bart think he can competently construct things. This episode represents a milestone in the history of the series as Snowball II is killed off. The primary plot is based on Richard Matheson's short story "Steel". The episode received mixed reviews.

== Plot ==
Bart is taunted by school bullies Nelson, Jimbo, Dolph and Kearney because he does not have a real 10-speed bike as they do. In order to get Homer to buy him one, Bart places his current bike so that it is run over and destroyed by Dr. Hibbert. Homer buys the 10-speed for Bart, but refuses to pay the small assembly fee and builds it himself. Bart is happy since it looks great and works perfectly at first, but it falls apart when he moons the bullies. Homer, wanting Bart to be proud of him, tries to build a battle robot for the show Robot Rumble. He fails to construct one, and instead assumes the identity of one, which Bart names "Chief Knock-a Homer". Unaware of Homer's ruse, Bart enters the robot in the Rumble.

Meanwhile, Hibbert's car runs over and kills the Simpsons' cat Snowball II, shortly after crushing Bart's bike. A devastated Lisa recites a poem tearfully at the funeral, where Snowball II is buried next to Snowball I. Lisa adopts a ginger cat, which she names Snowball III, but he drowns in the fish tank. The next cat, Coltrane (Snowball IV), jumps out of a window after hearing Lisa play her saxophone. The owner of the cat sanctuary refuses to give Lisa any more cats, but the Crazy Cat Lady wanders past and throws a cat at Lisa that strongly resembles Snowball II. Although Lisa tries to shoo the cat off, worried that she will meet the same fate as the others, the cat survives a near miss on the street when Gil Gunderson swerves to avoid hitting her while driving and crashes into a tree. Lisa decides to keep the cat, officially naming her Snowball V; however, the family will call her Snowball II in order to save money on a feeding dish. Principal Skinner comments disparagingly on the choice, but relents when Lisa points out that the same had previously been done for him.

Homer defeats numerous opponents and makes it to the finals, despite being injured from the battles with the other robots. In the final match against Professor Frink's undefeated Killhammad Aieee, a super-robot of both impressive design and skill, Bart finds Homer in “Chief Knock-a Homer” after the grueling first round. Caught, Homer apologizes to Bart, but Bart is impressed because of all the pain Homer went through to win his son's admiration. However, by then the second round has begun, and Killhammad Aieee grabs “Chief Knock-a Homer”, with Homer still inside, to finish the fight, until it squeezes Homer out of the robot and immediately stops as soon as it sees him. Frink explains that the robot follows Isaac Asimov's Three Laws of Robotics and has been programmed to serve humans rather than harm them, with Killhammad Aieee setting out a chair for Homer and pouring him a martini. Homer wins the match (although one of the commentators points out that the tournament rules prohibit any human combatants) and Bart is proud of him.

== Cultural references ==
- The title of the episode includes the phrase "(Annoyed Grunt)" which is how Homer's catchphrase "D'oh!" is written in episode scripts. Making the episode title read "I, D'oh-bot" - a play on Isaac Asimov's I, Robot as well as the sci-fi action movie of the same name released later the same year.
- Robot Rumble parodies the robot combat shows Robot Wars and BattleBots.
- Homer's robot, Chief Knock-a Homer, is a reference to the former Atlanta Braves mascot Chief Noc-A-Homa.
- The song playing while Bart and Milhouse are cycling is "Magic Carpet Ride" performed by Steppenwolf.
- During one of the Robot Rumble matches, one of the commentators states that one robot is "killing him softly with his saw," a reference to the Roberta Flack song.
- Dr. Hibbert has a Kool and the Gang air-freshener in his car.
- The song playing during the Robot Rumble montage is "Watching Scotty Grow" performed by Bobby Goldsboro (The same song played in the Season 3 episode "Saturdays of Thunder" as Homer was helping Bart build a soapbox racer). Homer also sings part of this song when delirious from blood loss and a concussion.
- The robot that Professor Frink's robot turns into a trophy is the T-800 endoskeleton from the Terminator film series.
- Professor Frink's robot is named 'Smashius Clay' a.k.a. 'Killhammad Aieee', based on the boxer Muhammad Ali and his birth name Cassius Clay.
- Professor Frink's robot is largely designed after the ED-209 from the film RoboCop and its accompanying series.
- Lisa's fourth cat, Coltrane, is named after the influential jazz performer John Coltrane.
- The robot Circuit Ray Leonard is based on the boxer Sugar Ray Leonard.
- The song playing while Homer fights Professor Frink's robot is "...In A Bag" by Static-X.
- While Lisa is preparing food for Snowball III, she sings a song with the same melody as the Hokey Pokey song.

== Reception ==
=== Viewing figures ===
The episode was watched by 16.30 million viewers, which was the 13th most-watched show that week.

=== Critical response ===
Colin Jacobson of DVD Movie Guide was critical of the episode, saying it "starts pretty well but droops before too long. The robot theme is too silly, and the cat sequences are too morbid. Some of the battle bots bits amuse, but they're not enough to overcome the episode's general flaws."

On Four Finger Discount, Brendan Dando and Guy Davis liked the episode because it showed Homer being a good father and also because they were fans of Robot Wars.
