= The Ziff Who Came to Dinner =

- The Simpsons episode
- Episode no.: Season 15; Episode 14
- Directed by: Nancy Kruse
- Written by: Deb Lacusta & Dan Castellaneta
- Production code: FABF08
- Original air date: March 14, 2004

Guest appearances
- Jon Lovitz as Artie Ziff, Jay Sherman, Llewelyn Sinclair, Aristotle Amadopolis, and Professor Lombardo

Episode features
- Chalkboard gag: "I will not speculate on how hot teacher used to be"
- Couch gag: In a parody of Powers of Ten, the camera zooms out to an overhead shot of the house, the neighborhood, the US, the Earth, the Solar System and finally galaxies, which become atoms, then zooming out to molecular structures, DNA helices and then Homer's head, then back to the couch scene. Finally, Homer exclaims, "Wow!"
- Commentary: Al Jean; Deb Lacusta; Dan Castellaneta; Ian Maxtone-Graham; Matt Selman; Michael Price; Marc Wilmore; Tom Gammill; Max Pross; Matt Warburton; Maurice LaMarche

Episode chronology
← Previous "Smart & Smarter"	Next → "Co-Dependents' Day"
- The Simpsons season 15

"The Ziff Who Came to Dinner" is the fourteenth episode of the fifteenth season of the American animated television series The Simpsons. It originally aired on the Fox network in the United States on March 14, 2004. This is the third of nine episodes to date written by The Simpsons voice actor Dan Castellaneta and his wife, Deb Lacusta, and the episode was directed by Nancy Kruse.

The episode focuses on Artie Ziff, who takes residence in the Simpson family's attic after declaring bankruptcy. After playing poker with Homer and losing, he gives Homer all the shares of stock of his bankrupt company. Homer then gets arrested and Marge gets upset with Artie. Jon Lovitz guest starred as Artie Ziff and other various characters he has portrayed on the show. The episode received mixed reviews.

== Plot ==
Homer takes Bart and Lisa to see a movie, and he must bring Ned Flanders' children with him because Ned volunteered to take the senior citizens for ice cream for Jasper's birthday. However, at the theater, all the kid-friendly movies are sold out, and Rod and Todd will not let Homer see a raunchy teen comedy. After hearing Lenny mention he had a small part in the horror movie The Re-Deadening, Homer takes the kids to see the movie, leaving Bart and Lisa scared. At home, they think they hear noises from the attic. When they look in the attic, their fears scare them away. When Bart and Lisa ask Homer and Marge to look in the attic, they discover Artie Ziff living there.

Artie explains that his Internet business, Ziffcorp, crashed in the dot-com bubble, and he lost all his money. He chose to live with the Simpsons, claiming that Marge was the closest thing he ever had to true love—although Marge notes that they only had one date where he almost raped her on their high school prom night. (Note: As depicted in the second season episode "The Way We Was") Artie promises that he will be on his best behavior, which Marge objects to, but Homer, Bart, and Lisa do not. Artie connects with Lisa by reading to her. When he cannot afford to buy ice cream for Bart and Milhouse, he attempts to hang himself. Homer gets Artie down and takes him to Moe's Tavern. Marge learns that the SEC is looking for Artie, who is playing poker with Homer and his friends. Homer wins 98% of Ziffcorp's outstanding stock. The SEC comes to arrest Artie, but Homer says he is the majority stockholder. To protect himself, Artie has Homer take the blame.

Homer is taken into SEC custody, placed on trial, and ultimately sentenced to ten years in prison. Blaming Artie for this and angered by his selfishness, Marge kicks him out of the house and tells him she never wants to see him ever again. Visiting Moe's, Artie encounters Patty and Selma, and Selma takes Artie to her apartment after he mentions putting Homer in prison. After they spend the night together, Artie decides to turn over his corporate books to admit he is the real crook. He turns himself in, and Homer is released from prison. In prison, Artie uses a squirt bottle to put out the prisoners' cigarettes, much to their anger.

== Reception ==
=== Viewing figures ===
The episode earned a 3.9 rating and was watched by 10.67 million viewers, which was the 23rd most-watched show that week.

=== Critical response ===
In a September 2008 review, Robert Canning of IGN gave the episode a 5.8 out of 10, saying "Unfortunately, 'The Ziff Who Came to Dinner' fails to match the previous episode's quality in both story and humor."

Colin Jacobson of DVD Movie Guide said it was "a fairly enjoyable episode" and liked that Jon Lovitz voiced multiple characters in the same episode.

On Four Finger Discount, Brendan Dando and Guy Davis thought the episode did not have much substance even with the appearance of Artie Ziff. They also thought the "strike rate" of the episodes written by Castellaneta and Lacusta up to this point in the series "is not great".

In 2023, Florencia Aberastury of Comic Book Resources wrote that it was questionable that the Simpsons family members ignore Marge's objection to Artie staying with them despite him assaulting her in the past. She states, "No one seems to care about Marge's feelings, nor do they think it's wrong to have Artie stay over, even though he tried to assault Marge more than once. Artie Ziff is not a character to root for or make a joke out of, and many might even find him triggering."
