= Fraudcast News =

- The Simpsons episode
- Mr. Burns is outraged by the headline of Lisa's newspaper in a promotional image for the episode.
- Episode no.: Season 15; Episode 22
- Directed by: Bob Anderson
- Written by: Don Payne
- Production code: FABF18
- Original air date: May 23, 2004

Episode features
- Couch gag: The family members fly in dressed as popular anime characters (Bart is Astro Boy, Homer is Ultraman, Lisa is Sailor Moon, Marge is Princess from Science Ninja Team Gatchaman and Maggie is Pikachu from Pokémon) and land on a bench with "シンプソンズ" on it, Japanese for "Simpsons".
- Commentary: Al Jean; Don Payne; Ian Maxtone-Graham; Matt Selman; Michael Price; Tom Gammill; Max Pross

Episode chronology
← Previous "Bart-Mangled Banner"	Next → "Treehouse of Horror XV"
- The Simpsons season 15

"Fraudcast News" is the twenty-second and final episode of the fifteenth season of the American animated television series The Simpsons. It originally aired on the Fox network in the United States on May 23, 2004. The episode was written by Don Payne and directed by Bob Anderson.

In this episode, Mr. Burns acquires all media outlets in town to improve his image while Lisa begins publishing her own newspaper. The episode received positive reviews. Payne won the Writers Guild of America's Paul Selvin Award, which honors works that focus on First Amendment issues, for his work on the episode.

== Plot ==
Springfield holds a ceremony dedicating their newest national park, Geezer Rock, a rock formation which resembles the face of an old man in profile. As Lisa Simpson prepares to read a poem there at the behest of Mayor Quimby, Homer notices that there is a small tree growing in the eye of the rock. Fearing that it will destroy Geezer Rock over time, he rushes over and pulls it out. This causes Geezer Rock to fall apart, and everyone runs for their lives — except for Mr. Burns, who winds up in a landslide. Smithers is fearful he has lost Mr. Burns.

Lisa is saddened that no one ever heard her poem, and she publishes it on Marge's suggestion. Meanwhile, it turns out that Burns survived the horrible landslide through slithering his way out and subsisting on centipedes, insects and mole milk. However, Springfield's local news instead reports on the destruction of Geezer Rock and then labels Burns as being a hateful man nobody liked.

Lisa distributes the very first issue of her newspaper, The Red Dress Press, which is well received. She enlists the help of Bart, Milhouse Van Houten, Martin Prince, Nelson Muntz, and Ralph Wiggum among others, to publish her newspaper's second issue. Meanwhile, to improve his image after the landslide, Burns acquires all media outlets in Springfield except Lisa's newspaper. He even makes an episode of The Itchy & Scratchy Show promoting nuclear power. Later, Burns tries to bait Lisa with ponies in an attempt to acquire her newspaper, but she will not give up. Lisa is saddened when all the other employees of the newspaper leave her, but is relieved when Bart decides to stay and help Lisa publish more issues.

Burns gets back at Lisa by cutting off the Simpsons' power, so Lisa is forced to write her next issue through an old mimeograph that Principal Skinner used in Vietnam. Burns finally wins the war by interrogating Homer with a truth serum so he can damage Lisa's reputation; the following day's Springfield Shopper boasts the headline, "LISA’S A TOTAL WACKO, IMPLIES FATHER", and goes further by humiliating Milhouse's crush upon her. Lisa writes her final "I Give Up" edition and shuts down the Red Dress Press. Homer responds by creating his own newspaper, The Homer Times, with which he defends Lisa and her journalistic integrity, while many of the townspeople, inspired by Homer, also create their own newspapers to voice their individual opinions. Burns realizes that, while he succeeded in defeating Lisa and her journal, he cannot possibly buy out everyone nor stop people criticizing him. As a result, he is forced to acknowledge that no one besides Rupert Murdoch can truly control the whole media, and goes out on a shopping spree with Smithers for relief.

== Reception ==
=== Viewing figures ===
In its original airing, this episode was watched by 9.2 million viewers.

=== Critical response ===
Colin Jacobson of DVD Movie Guide thought the episode was better than the previous episode even though they both dealt with political commentary. He said the episode was "a good capper for a spotty but often enjoyable season."

On Four Finger Discount, Brendan Dando and Guy Davis liked the final two acts and felt the episode's plot was realistic in contrast with the previous episode.

=== Awards and nominations ===
At the 57th Writers Guild of America Awards, writer Don Payne won the Paul Selvin Award for this episode. In addition, he was also nominated for the Writers Guild of America Award for Television: Animation for his script to this episode.

== See also ==
- Old Man of the Mountain, a New Hampshire rock structure which collapsed a year before this episode aired
