= 'Tis the Fifteenth Season =

- The Simpsons episode
- Promotional artwork featuring Homer, in a parody of Dr. Seuss' How the Grinch Stole Christmas!
- Episode no.: Season 15; Episode 7
- Directed by: Steven Dean Moore
- Written by: Michael Price
- Production code: FABF02
- Original air date: December 14, 2003

Episode features
- Couch gag: The family members fly in dressed as popular anime characters (Bart is Astro Boy, Homer is Ultraman, Lisa is Sailor Moon, Marge is Jun from Science Ninja Team Gatchaman and Maggie is Pikachu from Pokémon).
- Commentary: Al Jean; Michael Price; Matt Selman; John Frink; Don Payne; Dana Gould; Tom Gammill; Max Pross; Steven Dean Moore

Episode chronology
← Previous "Today I Am a Clown"	Next → "Marge vs. Singles, Seniors, Childless Couples and Teens, and Gays"
- The Simpsons season 15

"'Tis the Fifteenth Season" is the seventh episode of the fifteenth season of the American animated television series The Simpsons, and the seventh Christmas-themed episode overall. It first aired on the Fox network in the United States on December 14, 2003. The episode was written by Michael Price and directed by Steven Dean Moore.

In this episode, Homer feels guilty after spending most of the family's Christmas present money for himself, so he vows to be more charitable. The episode received positive reviews.

== Plot ==
At the Springfield Nuclear Power Plant, the employees of Sector 7G have a Secret Santa. Homer receives a DVD player and the first season of Magnum P.I. from Carl, but Homer himself, at the very last moment, gets Lenny a wrap of Certs from the vending machine, much to everybody's chagrin. Instead of a Christmas bonus, Mr. Burns gives Homer a Joe DiMaggio baseball card. He sells it to Comic Book Guy and earns a small fortune, then takes the family Christmas shopping at upmarket shops. Homer promises to buy a large Christmas tree, but instead spends most of the money on a talking astrolabe for himself, meaning that the only Christmas tree Homer can buy with the leftover money is a cheap, dry, twig-like tree that catches fire if rubbed; after hearing the astrolabe talk, the family are disappointed by his selfish behavior. That night, after being made to sleep on the couch by Marge, Homer watches Mr. McGrew's Christmas Carol and after imagining seeing his name in the show, realizes that he must change his ways.

Now more charitable, Homer apologizes for his mistakes, donates his old clothes to the homeless shelter, gives Marge the last porkchop at dinner, and builds a public skating rink in his backyard, as well as giving Lenny a decent Christmas present to make up for the Secret Santa: a cube made of photographs of Lenny and his friends. At church, Ned Flanders becomes envious of Homer's position as the new nicest person in town and sets out to buy gifts for everyone to regain the title. Meanwhile, Lisa tells Homer about her Buddhist beliefs that people would be happier without material goods. For his next good deed, on Christmas Eve night, Homer sneaks into the citizens' houses and steals their presents. In the morning, an angry mob confronts Homer and Flanders. Flanders calms them by reciting a Bible verse, while Homer shows a Christmas star, which actually is a distress flare fired by Hans Moleman, before he and Ned give everyone back their presents and everybody sings "Hark! The Herald Angels Sing". The episode ends with Snake stealing Homer's astrolabe and running away.

== Production ==
The episode was written by Michael Price, who has cited "Homer's summation of what Christmas means" as his favorite contribution to the show. He has said that the speech "pretty much stayed that way through all drafts of the episode."

== Cultural references ==
Mr. McGrew's Christmas Carol, the Christmas special that Homer watches, is a parody of Mr. Magoo's Christmas Carol. The montage in which Homer takes all the presents from Springfield strongly references the How the Grinch Stole Christmas! television special. In fact, a parody of the song "You're a Mean One, Mr. Grinch", sung by Dan Castellaneta, can be heard during the montage.

== Reception ==
=== Viewing figures ===
The episode was watched by 11.28 million viewers, which was the 28th most-watched show that week.

=== Critical response ===
On November 2, 2004, the episode was released in the United States on a DVD collection titled The Simpsons Christmas 2, along with the twelfth season episodes "Homer vs. Dignity" and "Skinner's Sense of Snow" and the fourteenth season episode "Dude, Where's My Ranch?". While reviewing the DVD, Brian James of PopMatters wrote that "'Tis the Fifteenth Season" is "hardly a masterpiece, but it does feature a talking astrolabe and the phrase 'double-bacon genius-burger,' two elements that deserve a spot in Simpson Valhalla. It's a shame that such entries don't come as fast and furious as they did a decade ago, but that The Simpsons does offer a few belly laughs now and then, rather than being a complete embarrassment this late in the game is a bigger accomplishment than anyone gives it credit for. It's still just a cartoon, and still a pretty good one."

Kyle Ryan of The A.V. Club praised the episode for "strik[ing] a nice balance between sharp satire and real heart."

Colin Jacobson of DVD Movie Guide said that Flanders was acting out of character and that there were too many holiday show references. He felt the episode was "fairly uninspired."

On Four Finger Discount, Guy Davis and Brendan Dando thought it was a "perfectly acceptable Christmas special." They thought Flanders' jealousy reminded them of the fifth season episode "Homer Loves Flanders", but felt Homer's gift to himself was more thoughtless than selfish since he is the family's sole provider.

=== Themes and analysis ===
Wind Goodfriend wrote that Homer learning making sacrifices is an example of an investment couples make where the individuals give something up for the good of their relationship.
