= The Wandering Juvie =

- The Simpsons episode
- Bart and Gina
- Episode no.: Season 15; Episode 16
- Directed by: Lauren MacMullan
- Written by: John Frink & Don Payne
- Production code: FABF11
- Original air date: March 28, 2004

Guest appearances
- Sarah Michelle Gellar as Gina Vendetti; Charles Napier as the Warden; Jane Kaczmarek as Judge Constance Harm

Episode features
- Couch gag: The shutter click of a camera can be heard as an undeveloped Polaroid photo floats to the couch and develops into the Simpsons family.
- Commentary: Al Jean; Don Payne; Ian Maxtone-Graham; Matt Selman; Michael Price; Tom Gammill; Max Pross

Episode chronology
← Previous "Co-Dependents' Day"	Next → "My Big Fat Geek Wedding"
- The Simpsons season 15

"The Wandering Juvie" is the sixteenth episode of the fifteenth season of the American animated television series The Simpsons. It originally aired on the Fox network in the United States on March 28, 2004. The episode was written by John Frink and Don Payne and was directed by Lauren MacMullan.

It guest-starred Sarah Michelle Gellar as Gina Vendetti. It also guest-starred Charles Napier and Jane Kaczmarek in a role reprised by the latter from the season 13 episode "The Parent Rap."

In this episode, Bart gets sent to juvenile hall after registering for gifts at a department store and having a fraudulent wedding to obtain gifts. This episode sees the first appearance of Gina Vendetti, who later appears in "Moonshine River". The episode received positive reviews.

== Plot ==
When the Simpson family is at the Costington's department store, Bart uses the wedding gift registry as a prank to register himself and his bride, "Lotta Cooties", for wedding presents. Bart invites many people to his so-called "wedding" and plans to take all the unused gifts back for store credit, but he is stopped by Chief Wiggum, who arrests Bart and rejects his bribe of the wedding presents. Bart is sentenced to six months of juvenile detention by Judge Constance Harm.

At the detention center, Bart is afraid he will be buried alive in the sandpit or photographed being punched while going down a slide. He soon notices that the girls' Juvie is on the other side of a chain-link fence. Bart attempts to schmooze with these girls, only to have them attack and immobilize him. One of the girls, Gina Vendetti, uses a knife to destroy Bart's uniform, threatening to castrate him next time he comes near their fence. Bart's problems continue when two weeks before his release he is partnered with Gina for the dance by the warden. When they are dancing, Gina escapes with Bart using a rope, finding themselves on a window ledge. Due to the fact that they are handcuffed together, Gina is forced to bring a reluctant Bart along before the window can be closed, though he only comes after she kisses him. Slowly, they gain each other's trust.

On the lam, the duo look for a blacksmith who can remove their cuffs. They are freed, but after it happens, Gina is alone and forlorn. She starts crying and admits to Bart that she has no family. When he sympathizes with her, she angrily tackles him until the police come and arrest them (and a bear that Cletus correctly predicted would attack Wiggum). Feeling terrible for causing Bart's sentence to be extended, Gina confesses that she was behind the escape, clearing Bart of further charges. In the end, the Simpsons and the warden step in to help Gina feel better for being without family, offering a Mexican food feast in her cell.

== Production ==
Sarah Michelle Gellar guest starred as Gina Vendetti.

== Cultural references ==
Much of this episode's plot (where a shackled-together Bart and Gina escape prison and learn to work together to survive) is inspired from the 1958 film The Defiant Ones. The warden has a sampler hanging on his office wall that reads His Judgment Cometh And That Right Soon. The warden in Shawshank Redemption has the same sampler.

== Reception ==
=== Viewing figures ===
The episode earned as 3.8 rating and was watched by 10.52 million viewers, which was the 28th most-watched show that week.

=== Critical response ===
Colin Jacobson of DVD Movie Guide thought it was one of the better episodes of the season but also said it was similar to previous episodes where Bart gets a love interest.

On Four Finger Discount, Guy Davis and Brendan Dando liked the episode, especially compared to the previous episode, and they highlighted the performance by Sarah Michelle Gellar.
