= Marge vs. Singles, Seniors, Childless Couples and Teens, and Gays =

- The Simpsons episode
- Episode no.: Season 15; Episode 8
- Directed by: Bob Anderson
- Written by: Jon Vitti
- Production code: FABF03
- Original air date: January 4, 2004

Guest appearance
- Marcia Wallace as Edna Krabappel

Episode features
- Couch gag: The Simpsons sit on the couch as normal. Knives are hurled at them, but hit the wall. Homer tries to get a bowl of chips, but another knife stops him.
- Commentary: Al Jean; Jon Vitti; Matt Selman; Don Payne; J. Stewart Burns; Tom Gammill; Max Pross

Episode chronology
← Previous "'Tis the Fifteenth Season"	Next → "I, (Annoyed Grunt)-Bot"
- The Simpsons season 15

"Marge vs. Singles, Seniors, Childless Couples and Teens, and Gays" is the eighth episode of the fifteenth season of the American animated television series The Simpsons. It originally aired on the Fox network in the United States on January 4, 2004. The episode was written by Jon Vitti and directed by Bob Anderson.

After a baby concert becomes a disaster, Lindsay Naegle rallies the town to favor childless adults, but Marge fights back with a voter initiative. The episode received mixed reviews.

== Plot ==
When Bart and Lisa fight over what to watch on television, they accidentally change the channel to a show hosted by a children's singer named Roofi. This does not appeal to Bart and Lisa, but Maggie adores the show. After Bart says she can buy a compact disc so that they can watch television, Marge buys the disc and plays it everywhere, annoying Bart, Lisa, and Homer, while Marge ignores them because it pleases Maggie. Marge later buys tickets to a Roofi concert. However, the concert is crowded because it is oversold. As it starts to rain, making the babies restless, Roofi appears on stage. He is hit in the face with a baby bottle, abruptly ends the show, and escapes on a helicopter. Soon, the babies riot against the police sent to contain them.

In a town meeting after the disaster, the adults of Springfield are angry because Mayor Quimby forcibly takes $1 million from the audience to cover the damage. Lindsay Naegle's anti-youth group "Singles, Seniors, Childless Couples and Teens and Gays Against Parasitic Parents" rallies the town to remove anything that provides comfort to families over Homer and Marge's objections. A statue of a deadbeat dad is erected, a school bus ignores children to take senior citizens gambling, and a new ordinance allows children who misbehave in public to be tasered. Marge tries to reason with Naegle but she is not convinced after seeing her deal with her children. Undeterred, Marge tells her she has created a petition to place the "Families Come First" voter initiative on the ballot.

Marge announces the lobbying group "Proud Parents Against Singles, Seniors, Childless Couples and Teens, and Gays", but no one wants to help fund her cause. However, support grows after Mr. Burns signs Marge's petition because he wants children who can supply him with organs. Other residents follow his lead and the initiative gets on the ballot. When the opposition slanders Marge with a commercial, Homer pledges to help, but he creates bumper stickers and a commercial with the wrong information. With the initiative set to be defeated, Bart and Lisa concoct a plan. On the day of the election, the children hug the childless adults outside the polling place, infecting them with childhood germs and preventing them from voting. The initiative passes, and Homer celebrates by sending his kids at an R-rated movie with no supervision while he and Marge go to somewhere to be alone.

== Cultural references ==
At the start of the episode Bart is watching a TV show called The Gator Baiter. This show and its Australian presenter are parodies of The Crocodile Hunter and its presenter Steve Irwin.

The coded language used by Bart and Lisa, that Marge states she can also understand, is known as Pig Latin.

The depiction of Milhouse crying after Moe modifies the Toys "R" Us store logo is directly copied from the 1943 film Divide and Conquer, which shows a French man crying as the French army departs the city of Marseille after they are defeated by the Nazis.

While attempting to get the TV remote from Maggie, Homer impersonates Curly Howard from the Three Stooges.

The babies becoming naked and passing pacifiers as if they are drugs at the baby concert while the song "Gimme Shelter" by The Rolling Stones plays in the background is a reference to the Woodstock music festival and the Altamont Free Concert.

== Reception ==
=== Viewing figures ===
This episode was watched by 12.00 million viewers, which was the 20th most-watched show that week.

=== Critical response ===
CinemaSentries gave the episode a positive review, writing "'Marge Vs. Singles, Seniors, Childless Couples and Teens and Gays' is a great example of the way the show used to be able to find hilarity in mocking both sides of an issue when it spoofs both the grueling life of a parent and the grueling lives of those without children who have to put up with the problems caused by other people's kids."

Colin Jacobson of DVD Movie Guide liked the scenes involving Roofi but felt the plot involving Lindsay Naegle "doesn't exploit its possibilities as well as it should."

On Four Finger Discount, Brendan Dando related to the Roofi scenario because he is a father while Guy Davis, who is childless, did not.

== Purported foreshadowing ==
In 2018, reports were made that the episode predicted the bankruptcy and end of the American toy retailer Toys "R" Us by showing Moe removing the reversed R from the store logo. However, in the episode, Moe reinserts the R in the forward facing direction.
