= The President Wore Pearls =

- The Simpsons episode
- Episode no.: Season 15; Episode 3
- Directed by: Mike B. Anderson
- Written by: Dana Gould
- Production code: EABF20
- Original air date: November 16, 2003

Guest appearances
- Michael Moore as himself; Marcia Wallace as Edna Krabappel

Episode features
- Couch gag: The shutter click of a camera can be heard as an undeveloped Polaroid photo floats to the couch and develops into the Simpsons family.
- Commentary: James L. Brooks; Matt Groening; Al Jean; Kevin Curran; Tom Gammill; Yeardley Smith; Michael Moore; Mike B. Anderson

Episode chronology
← Previous "My Mother the Carjacker"	Next → "The Regina Monologues"
- The Simpsons season 15

"The President Wore Pearls" is the third episode of the fifteenth season of the American animated television series The Simpsons. It first aired on the Fox network in the United States on November 16, 2003. In this episode, Lisa is elected student body president, but she strikes with the students when the faculty try to corrupt her to allow budget cuts.

Showrunner Al Jean, who is a fan of musical theater, conceived this episode as a parody of Evita. The episode was written by Dana Gould and directed by Mike B. Anderson, and stars guest stars documentary filmmaker Michael Moore as himself. The episode received positive reviews. Alf Clausen and Dana Gould's work in the episode was nominated for an Emmy Award for Outstanding Music and Lyrics.

== Plot ==
Springfield Elementary School holds a casino night as a fundraiser, hosted by student body president Martin Prince. Homer wins big, but when Martin says his winnings can only be redeemed for cafeteria scrip and not real money, the angry casino patrons riot. After the chaos has cleared, Principal Skinner tells Martin he must resign as the president. An election for a new president is announced and Lisa signs up. However, initially popular Nelson Muntz is favored to win, providing students (and some teachers) with answer keys to tests. During a debate in the school auditorium, she sings a song ("Vote For a Winner", a parody of "Don't Cry for Me Argentina") about how she will fight for student rights, winning them over.

Lisa easily wins the election. Worried by her determination and popularity, the faculty discusses how to control her. Following Mrs. Krabappel's suggestion that a woman's weakness is vanity, they sing another song ("I Am Their Queen", a spoof of "Rainbow High") and make Lisa over into a fashionable Eva Perón lookalike. She is initially resistant, but gives in since she reasons she will still be able to fight for the kids. The students love the new Lisa more than ever, but the faculty uses her as a scapegoat for dropping music, gym, and art from the curriculum to save on the budget, getting her to sign the paperwork without looking at it in exchange for a skeleton key to the school. Facing an outraged student body, Lisa resigns as president, goes back to her old red dress and spiky hair, and leads the students into a strike.

Filmmaker Michael Moore shows up to take their side, stating that children who do not receive music, gym and art are more likely to become unemployed and end up in one of his movies. The police arrive at the school, but Lisa convinces them to take their side too. Realizing there is no other way out of the crippling strike other than disposing of Lisa, Skinner has her transferred to a school for the "Academically Gifted and Troublesome". As her bus departs, her classmates and the rest of Springfield are saddened, but she reassures them by telling them that "[they] can still reach [her] via email ("Smart Girl Six Three", a parody of "Eva's Final Broadcast").

Just as Lisa arrives at her new school, Homer pulls up and refuses to let her attend, not wanting to deal with the extra driving time. Springfield Elementary is eventually able to restore music, art and gym by cancelling flu shots and selling loose cigarettes. As an endnote, the writers say that at the advice of their lawyers, they have absolutely no knowledge about a musical based on the life of Eva Perón.

== Production ==
The idea for the episode was devised by Al Jean, who was motivated by his love of theater. He regarded Evita as a great political musical, and stated that "[he] just always thought that it was one of the most brilliant things ever, and to have Lisa do that was the genesis of this episode." Although Yeardley Smith, the voice of Lisa, had originally assumed that the central conceit of the episode was intended as a political satire, Al Jean clarified in the commentary track that he had no political motivation and just wanted to "get Lisa singing".

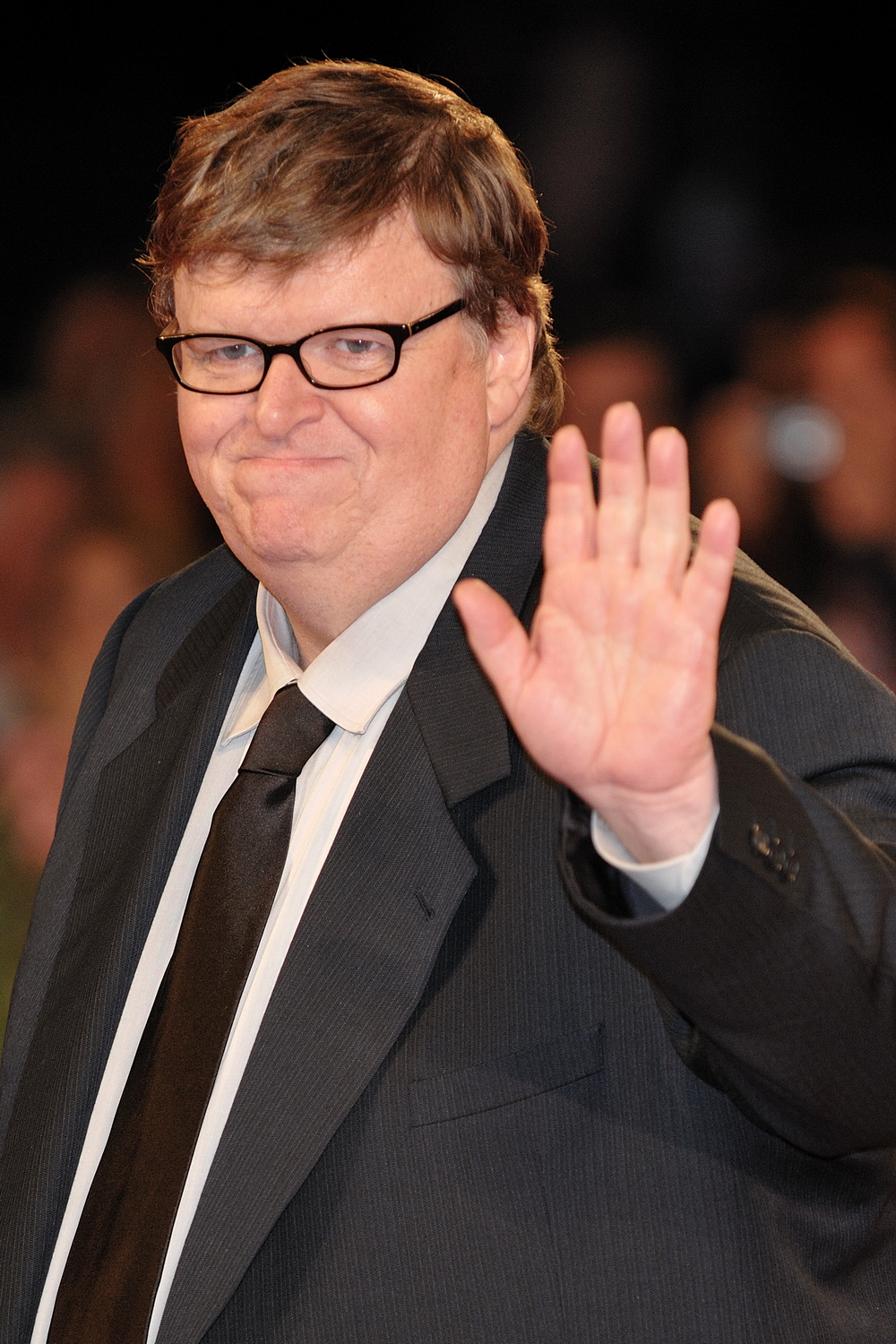
Michael Moore made a cameo as himself in this episode.

Jean also credits himself with the idea of inviting Michael Moore to make a guest appearance. He cites his love of Roger & Me (which he says "really captured the whole way [he] felt growing up [in Detroit]") as a contributing factor, but ultimately the deciding factor was hearing Moore's acceptance speech for Best Documentary Feature during the 75th Academy Awards, during which he publicly denounced George W. Bush. Jean notes that “the staff is full of fans”, so the idea was met with near-unanimous enthusiasm.

Moore quickly accepted the offer without even knowing what his role in the episode was going to be, stating that not only had he been watching The Simpsons since its conception as a series of shorts on The Tracey Ullman Show, he had been a fan of Matt Groening's work since the early 80s, and used to run Groening's Life in Hell comic strips in an alternative newspaper that he operated from Flint, Michigan. He appreciated that the episode focused on the elimination of art programs in public schools, and enjoyed being called a "professional buttinski" by Kent Brockman.

The musical numbers were composed by Alf Clausen, the show's primary composer from 1990 until 2017, and although episode writer Dana Gould is credited as the sole lyricist, Al Jean clarified in the commentary track that the lyrics were a collaborative effort between several Simpsons writers. Some time prior to the episode's conception, Jean suggested that, due to a “significant royalty [for] having songs in an episode”, any lyrics written by the writing staff for use in a Simpsons episode should be credited to whoever originally wrote the episode in order to prevent potential arguments over who should be credited and who should receive the royalties. Although the songs originally pitched were more faithful to the melodies of the Evita songs they were based on, the show was forced to modify the melodies for legal reasons. A medley of the songs featured in the episode was included in the 2007 compilation album The Simpsons: Testify.

== Reception ==
=== Viewing figures ===
The episode was watched by 12.74 million viewers, which was the 25th most-watched show that week.

=== Critical response ===
Colin Jacobson of DVD Movie Guide said the episode was "a generally solid show" and was able to integrate the songs well into the episode.

On Four Finger Discount, Brendan Dando and Guy Davis liked the music but did not like the rest of the story. They also did not like Homer’s role in the episode.

In 2007, Vanity Fair called "The President Wore Pearls" the tenth best episode of The Simpsons, the most recent episode on the list. John Orvted said, "It may seem ludicrous to include anything later than Season 8 in this list, but this one is brilliant. The musical numbers are astoundingly good, and Lisa's comeuppance is so well constructed it harkens back to the golden years of the show (Seasons 3 through 8)." In 2019, Time ranked the episode fourth in its list of 10 best Simpsons episodes picked by Simpsons experts.

In 2017, Michael Cavna of The Washington Post named "Vote for a Winner" as one of the 12 best songs by Alf Clausen.

In 2023, Tony Sokol of Den of Geek named the episode the sixth best episode of the 2000s, highlighting the music and the character study of Lisa.

=== Awards and nominations ===
Alf Clausen and Dana Gould were nominated for the Primetime Emmy Award for Outstanding Original Music and Lyrics at the 56th Primetime Emmy Awards for the first song in the episode, "Vote for a Winner", but lost to "Because You Are Beautiful" from Until the Violence Stops.
