= My Big Fat Geek Wedding =

- The Simpsons episode
- Episode no.: Season 15; Episode 17
- Directed by: Mark Kirkland
- Written by: Kevin Curran
- Production code: FABF12
- Original air date: April 18, 2004

Guest appearances
- Matt Groening as himself; Marcia Wallace as Edna Krabappel

Episode features
- Couch gag: Original airing: The back wall is a Play-Doh Fun Factory press that creates Play-Doh figures of the Simpsons. Repeats and syndication: The couch is a slot machine that shows Homer, Marge, Bart, and Lisa in the tumbler windows. Maggie, however, is replaced by lucky number "7" which signals a jackpot as a pile of gold coins spill out.
- Commentary: Matt Groening; Al Jean; Kevin Curran; Ian Maxtone-Graham; Matt Selman; Tom Gammill; Max Pross; Mike Reiss; Mark Kirkland

Episode chronology
← Previous "The Wandering Juvie"	Next → "Catch 'em if You Can"
- The Simpsons season 15

"My Big Fat Geek Wedding" is the seventeenth episode of the fifteenth season of the American animated television series The Simpsons. It first aired on the Fox network in the United States on April 18, 2004. The episode was written by Kevin Curran and directed by Mark Kirkland.

In this episode, Edna Krabappel ends her relationship with Principal Skinner on their wedding day, which causes tension between Homer and Marge. Series creator Matt Groening appeared as himself. The episode received negative reviews.

== Plot ==
At night, Marge is annoyed by Homer shaving batteries in bed. The next day, Principal Skinner, who is engaged to Edna Krabappel, (Note: As depicted in the fourteenth season episode "Special Edna") announces that they are to be married that weekend. Edna has her bachelorette party at the Simpson house with Duffman as a stripper. When Chief Wiggum tries to stop the party after a complaint from Ned, they coerce him into stripping as well. Meanwhile, Principal Skinner has his party at Moe's Tavern with Homer. After getting drunk, Skinner admits to Homer that he has doubts about marrying Edna. Homer tells Marge, and they agree to make sure Skinner and Edna get married. On the day of the wedding, Edna overhears Skinner and Homer discussing his doubts. After picturing a future anniversary in which Skinner is still unable to commit as well as continuing to be nagged by his mother Agnes, she runs away during the ceremony.

Left at the altar, Marge tries to comfort Skinner. Later, Marge tries to convince Edna to reconcile with Skinner for pragmatic reasons, but Edna would rather have a passionate relationship, which gives Marge her own doubts. With Skinner sad without Edna, Homer decides to help Skinner win her back. Outside her apartment, Homer feeds Skinner lines to woo Edna, while Marge feeds lines to Edna to reject him. Realizing Marge is there, Homer and Marge begin fighting about their own relationship. Later, Edna returns a wedding gift to Comic Book Guy, and they bond.

After some time, Homer gets Skinner to serenade Edna outside her apartment with the schoolchildren as a backup choir, but Comic Book Guy reveals that he and Edna are now in a relationship. Learning they are going to the Bi-Mon-Sci-Fi-Con, Homer and the family plan to confront them there and break them up. They find Edna and Comic Book Guy, who asks her to marry him immediately. Skinner arrives and fights Comic Book Guy until Edna tells them to stop. She tells Skinner he cannot win her back, and she also declines to marry Comic Book Guy because they are too different. He accepts her decision, but Skinner is upset. Edna receives support from Marge, who is still upset with Homer. Later at home, Homer apologizes to Marge and asks her to remarry him. She accepts, and the ceremony is conducted by a man dressed as a Klingon while the schoolchildren play music from the closet.

== Production ==
Series creator Matt Groening appeared as himself. In the episode, he is identified as the creator of the television series Futurama.

== Cultural references ==
Barney's rabbit sponsor is a reference to a similar situation in the 1950 film Harvey. Principal Skinner is wearing a Catwoman costume similar to the one worn in the 1992 film Batman Returns.

The band at the wedding reception is playing the song "Just the Two of Us" by Grover Washington Jr. The children and Skinner sing a parody of the song "The Lion Sleeps Tonight" by The Tokens.

== Reception ==
=== Viewing figures ===
The episode earned a 3.3 rating and was watched by 9.21 million viewers, which was the 35th most-watched show that week.

=== Critical response ===
DVD Movie Guide's Colin Jacobson said that he "never felt particularly interested in the Skinner/Edna relationship, so [the episode] falls in the red. It never quite rebounds from that deficit, as it fails to find much inspiration". He added that "A few laughs crop up along the way, but not enough to redeem it."

On Four Finger Discount, Brendan Dando liked the episode except for the subplot of Homer and Marge fighting while Guy Davis thought the fighting ruined the entire episode.

Screen Rant rated the relationship of Edna and Seymour one of the "10 Most Heartbreaking Separations", specifically calling out this episode saying, "After so much build-up and interference from Skinner's mother Agnes, it was sad for Simpsons fans to see that this relationship would probably never go anywhere."
