= Catch 'em if You Can =

- The Simpsons episode
- Episode no.: Season 15; Episode 18
- Directed by: Matthew Nastuk
- Written by: Ian Maxtone-Graham
- Production code: FABF14
- Original air date: April 25, 2004

Episode features
- Couch gag: The couch is a white cake. The Simpsons are squeezed out like icing on top of the cake.
- Commentary: Matt Groening; Al Jean; Ian Maxtone-Graham; Matt Selman; Kevin Curran; Tom Gammill; Max Pross; Mike Reiss; Jeff Nathanson

Episode chronology
← Previous "My Big Fat Geek Wedding"	Next → "Simple Simpson"
- The Simpsons season 15

"Catch 'em if You Can" is the eighteenth episode of the fifteenth season of the American animated television series The Simpsons. It first aired on the Fox network in the United States on April 25, 2004. The episode was written by Ian Maxtone-Graham and directed by Matthew Nastuk.

In this episode, Bart and Lisa refuse to accompany Homer and Marge to their uncle's birthday, so the parents decide to have a romantic vacation by themselves in Miami instead. When the children learn where they went, they decide to pursue their parents. The episode was well received by critics.

== Plot ==
Bart lectures the other students on the bus on the topic of water balloons. After he hits Lisa with one, she fights with him all the way home. Marge stops them after Maggie is accidentally thrown into a box of cat litter and tells the pair that they are going to Ohio to celebrate Uncle Tyrone's birthday. Bart and Lisa are saddened with the idea as Tyrone complained last year about why he is still alive. Homer and Marge relent and allow the kids to stay home; but Marge insists they do one family activity together. They all rent a romantic film; Bart and Lisa are unimpressed by it such that they ruin any moment the film might have created for Homer and Marge.

Homer and Marge look forward to their trip without the children as they ruin every possible chance of intimacy for them. At the airport the next day, they see people in another queue, dressed in Hawaiian shirts and skimpy tops, going to Miami. This causes them to reminisce on their less-than-stellar honeymoon at a beach billboard in a run-down area of Springfield. On a whim, they decide to forego visiting Tyrone and get on the plane to Miami as a second honeymoon. As the flight is overbooked, they are upgraded to first-class, much to their delight.

Bart, Lisa and Grampa learn on the news that the hotel in Dayton where Marge and Homer are supposed to be staying has been completely wiped out by a tornado. They suddenly get a call from Marge, informing them that all is well. Suspicious, Bart uses last-call return to find out the last incoming phone number and discovers their parents are in Miami. He and Lisa get Grampa to take them there.

Homer and Marge see the children waiting for them outside their hotel room door, so they run from the ready-to-track-them-down pair, causing Bart and Lisa to summon a hot pursuit of their parents in an instrumental musical montage and an animated sequence. They will not have any trouble paying for their chase, considering Homer has borrowed Ned Flanders' credit card and Bart has borrowed Rod Flanders' credit card. Meanwhile, in Miami, Grampa finds companionship with an old man named Raúl who responds by turning his hearing aid off.

Homer and Marge finally find themselves at the Niagara Falls, only to find the children are already there. When Bart and Lisa confront them, they agree to let them mess about in the room, making them even more despondent. The next day, Bart and Lisa, feeling a little guilty, decide to give their parents some space, and go to an amusement park, inadvertently running into Homer and Marge who snuck off for some time alone. Refusing to allow Lisa to explain, an angry Homer and Marge start running away again and find refuge in a giant inflatable castle, which their lovemaking antics cause them to fall into the Niagara River. The Canadian and American rescue teams start to fight over who is to rescue as the couple floats towards the falls and certain death, only to be saved by their large flotation device. They pass by the Maid of the Mist, whose captain asks them if there is anyone alive. Homer and Marge shout they are more alive than any of the boat's squares from inside the inflatable castle, as it floats away, and they engage in martial artistic sexual intercourse underneath the falls. Bart and Lisa, watching from a telescope, decide that everything worked out just fine.

Meanwhile, back in Springfield, Ned and Rod Flanders receive their monthly credit card bills and gasp at the charges Homer and Bart have run up.

== Cultural references ==
The title of the episode is a reference to the film Catch Me If You Can, which is also parodied in the musical montage.

When Bart and Lisa arrive in Miami, an excerpt of the Miami Vice theme song is heard.

Homer is traveling by air in first class and says "Look at me, I'm reading The Economist. Did you know Indonesia is at a crossroads?" and when questioned by his wife, he simply replies "It is!" Four days later, The Economist indeed had an article about Indonesia referring to the "crossroads", and mentioned the Simpsons episode in short weekly commentaries. The title of the issue was "Indonesia's Gambit". About seven months later, The Economist ran a cover headline reading "Indonesia at a Crossroads". The running gag continued with a direct reference on Sept. 22nd, 2013, an indirect one on Oct. 4th 2014, and another direct one on Nov. 20, 2024.

- Drederick Tatum tells Homer and Marge as they roll out of an elevator he is fighting a White Rhino at the Tropicana (a real Atlantic City casino) with shows at 2, 4, 6, 8, 10 & Midnight.
- Next to the Lackluster Video (itself a spoof of Blockbuster Video) entrance, there is a sign that reads "If it doesn't star Sandra Bullock, your rental is free!".
- In the same video store, Moe nervously enters the "ADULT FILMS" section in the back, to which Bart follows him in euphoric expectation, only to find out that the private room features arthouse movies from "Merchant-Ivory", "Truffaut", "Unfunny Woody Allen", "Henry Jaglom", "Bergman", "Spike & Ang Lee" rather than adult movies. (Truffaut's Stolen Kisses can be read listed in the "Spike & Ang Lee" section as well as its correct place.)
- There is a Futurama poster in the Lackluster video store.
- The song playing on the record player that the two older men are carrying is a re-recorded version of "Boogie Woogie Bugle Boy" by The Andrews Sisters on Capitol Records.
- The other people at Uncle Tyrone's birthday are the Simpsons that Homer gathered in the episode Lisa the Simpson.

== Reception ==
=== Viewing figures ===
The episode earned a 3.4 rating and was watched by 9.28 million viewers, which was the 42nd most-watched show that week.

=== Critical response ===
Colin Jacobson of DVD Movie Guide the episode was "a fairly okay show". He liked the scene of Grampa trying to seduce old women.

On Four Finger Discount, Guy Davis did not like the episode, but Brendan Dando related to certain scenes because he was a parent although he thought the writing was "absurd".

=== Awards and nominations ===
Writer Ian Maxtone-Graham won the Writers Guild of America Award for Television: Animation at the 57th Writers Guild of America Awards for this episode.
