= Simple Simpson =

- The Simpsons episode
- Marge kisses an upside-down Homer, dressed up as "Pie-Man" in a parody of a scene from the 2002 film Spider-Man.
- Episode no.: Season 15; Episode 19
- Directed by: Jim Reardon
- Written by: Jon Vitti
- Production code: FABF15
- Original air date: May 2, 2004

Guest appearance
- Nichelle Nichols as herself

Episode features
- Couch gag: The Simpsons slide down a pole into the Batcave, dressed as characters from the Batman franchise.
- Commentary: Al Jean; Jon Vitti; Matt Selman; Tim Long; Don Payne; J. Stewart Burns; Tom Gammill; Max Pross

Episode chronology
← Previous "Catch 'em if You Can"	Next → "The Way We Weren't"
- The Simpsons season 15

"Simple Simpson" is the nineteenth episode of the fifteenth season of the American animated television series The Simpsons. It originally aired on the Fox network in the United States on May 2, 2004. The episode was written by Jon Vitti and was the final episode to be directed by Jim Reardon.

In this episode, Homer becomes a vigilante known as Pie Man, who throws pies at people's faces as a form of justice, until he is blackmailed by Mr. Burns to do his bidding. Actress Nichelle Nichols appeared as herself. The episode received positive reviews.

== Plot ==
After seeing a commercial where he could win a free tour of "Farmer Billy's Bacon" factory, Homer goes on a pursuit to find the golden ticket. He, however, only wins a silver ticket, which allows him to be the judge of the pig competition at the Springfield County Fair. At the fair, Lisa's entry in the place setting competition is wrecked by the Rich Texan, who then mocks her, which causes Homer to want to retaliate. Recalling a warning from Chief Wiggum that he will be arrested if he commits another assault felony, Homer disguises himself as a masked superhero, the "Pie Man", and throws a pie straight into the Rich Texan's face, leaving him humiliated and the crowd laughing. The next day, after Homer hears that the Comic Book Guy has ripped off Bart, he arrives as the Pie Man (with a newer look) and throws a pie in his face, humiliating him in front of Nichelle Nichols, whom the Comic Book Guy invited for tea and some chit chat, and then promptly leaves as soon as she sees his face with pie (saying she would not date William Shatner for the same reason).

As the days go by, the Pie Man becomes big news, pieing many of "Springfield's scoundrels". Springfield's citizens anticipate that the Pie Man will come to the opening ceremony for the new cosmetic surgery clinic, which Mayor Quimby has built in place of the previous occupant, the Springfield Children's Hospital. Chief Wiggum also has a trap planned for the Pie Man, who has been skipping "bike safety lectures". As expected, Pie Man arrives, but as the trap is sprung on him, Pie Man escapes, though not before being shot in the arm. He also saves Marge from being trampled by the panicking crowd and steals a kiss from her, which causes Marge to become infatuated with Pie Man. Returning home and after prying the bullet out of his arm, Homer is exposed as the Pie Man by Lisa, who had suspected him to be the Pie Man after repeatedly getting his mail. Homer reveals his secret life in the "Pie Cave", which is just the basement, where Lisa pleads with Homer to stop his Pie Man persona before he gets more seriously hurt. Homer promises to stop.

Yet the next day at the power plant, Homer cannot cope with Mr. Burns's bullying of him and his co-workers. After imagining a conversation with pies, Homer decides to be Pie Man one last time to get back at Burns. After pieing him, Homer tries to run off, but falls asleep on a couch right behind Burns and Smithers, who capture and expose him. Burns promptly blackmails Homer to be his "personal hitman", to pie those that Burns hates, or else be ratted out to the police and forced to do community service.

After pieing himself and later a Girl Scout selling cookies, Homer is tasked by Burns to pie Tibetan Buddhism spiritual teacher, the Dalai Lama (as according to Burns "all his talk of peace and love is honking off my Red Chinese masters"). Appearing at the Lama's gathering, Homer sees Lisa is present and is stuck between breaking his promise to her and Burns' threat. Just as he prepares to pie the Lama, Homer stops and decides to reveal himself as the Pie Man. However, no one believes Homer is the Pie Man, even at his own insistence, due to their own stupidity, believing that Pie Man had other powers including the power to talk to animals and spit acid. Lisa then tells Homer that he had created a hero that he himself could not live up to. Agreeing, Homer takes Lisa home, relieved that he is finally free from Burns' control.

That night, Marge admits that she also knew Homer was the Pie Man, saying it was clearly him in that suit. Homer then stands on the roof, declaring that the Pie Man will return to help people who get mistreated, along with his new sidekick, The Cupcake Kid (Bart). Marge then asks them to clean out the gutters since they are already up on the roof, much to their irritation.

== Production ==
Actress Nichelle Nichols appeared as herself.

== Cultural references ==
The scene of Homer making his Pie Man costume and his upside-down kiss with Marge in the alley are both parodies of the 2002 film Spider-Man. Farmer Billy's "Golden Ticket" contest is a reference to the contest in Charlie and the Chocolate Factory by Roald Dahl; like Willy Wonka he wears a top hat. The show Promiscuous Idiot's Island is a parody of the reality shows Temptation Island, Joe Millionaire and The Bachelor. Lisa's placemat features the quote "If music be the food of love, play on," from Act 1, Scene 1 of Twelfth Night by William Shakespeare. In the commercial of "Farmer Billy's Bacon" factory the pig in blue overalls and a hat looks similar to Porky Pig. The country singer at the fair resembles real-life country star Alan Jackson, while the song "America (I Love this Country)" is a parody of Lee Greenwood's song "God Bless the USA" and the Dalai Lama's entrance music is "See See Rider", just like Elvis Presley.

The episode's couch gag sees the Simpsons slide down to the Batcave dressed as characters from the Batman franchise, specifically their 1960s Batman incarnations: Homer is Batman, Marge is Catwoman, Lisa and Maggie are Batgirl and Bart is Robin.

== Other media ==
The character of Pie Man has been included in the comic series Simpsons Super Spectacular. In 2007, McFarlane Toys released a 6-inch figurine of Homer and Bart as Pie Man and Cupcake Kid.

== Reception ==
=== Viewing figures ===
The episode earned a 3.5 rating and was watched by 9.51 million viewers, which was the 37th most-watched show that week.

=== Critical response ===
Colin Jacobson of DVD Movie Guide liked the premise of a superhero parody and its related cultural references. He said, "[w]hile I won't call this a great show, it's pretty good."

On Four Finger Discount, Guy Davis and Brendan Dando also liked the superhero premise but thought the episode only works if the story is not expected to be part of the continuity of the series.
