= Co-Dependents' Day =

- The Simpsons episode
- Brave Combo on The Simpsons
- Episode no.: Season 15; Episode 15
- Directed by: Bob Anderson
- Written by: Matt Warburton
- Production code: FABF10
- Original air date: March 21, 2004

Guest appearances
- Marcia Wallace as Edna Krabappel; Brave Combo as themselves

Episode features
- Couch gag: The Simpsons sit on the couch as normal, but then begin to decay and turn to dust.
- Commentary: Matt Groening; Al Jean; Matt Warburton; Matt Selman; Michael Price; Tom Gammill; Max Pross; Allen Glazier; Alan Sepinwall

Episode chronology
| ← Previous "The Ziff Who Came to Dinner" | Next → "The Wandering Juvie" |
- The Simpsons season 15

"Co-Dependents' Day" is the fifteenth episode of the fifteenth season of the American animated television series The Simpsons. It originally aired on the Fox network in the United States on March 21, 2004. The episode was written by Matt Warburton and directed by Bob Anderson, with the band Brave Combo appearing as themselves. In the episode, Marge joins Homer in drinking alcohol, which inadvertently causes her to become a drinking addict.

The episode was watched by 11.24 million viewers and received a 4.1 rating. However, it received negative reviews from critics and is considered to be one of the worst episodes of the series. Criticism was directed toward its third act and Homer's characterization.

== Plot ==
Homer, Bart, and Lisa see the newest Cosmic Wars film, The Gathering Shadow, and the movie turns out to be less than what they expected. At home, Marge suggests that Bart and Lisa write a letter to Cosmic Wars creator Randall Curtis. Two weeks later, they get a reply from Curtis, which completely ignores their criticism, having sent them Jim-Jam merchandise. This forces the Simpsons to go on a trip to California, where Homer and Marge go to wineries, and Bart and Lisa go to the Cosmic Wars Ranch. The kids visit Curtis, and tell him that his Cosmic Wars movies have lost their way. Curtis dismisses their criticisms, until Lisa explains that improved technology does not count for story and characterization. Curtis agrees, and decides to go back to his storytelling roots by watching more samurai films and Westerns for inspiration.

Bart and Lisa rejoin Homer and Marge, who are both drunk from free samples of the wine. Back in Springfield, Homer and Marge go to Moe's Tavern and drink more wine. Moe opens a bottle of Château Latour 1886 vintage wine, clearly unaware of its value. Homer and Marge then continue to drink heavily for several days, until Marge suffers a particularly painful hangover. She tells Homer that they should not be drinking, and he agrees. Unfortunately, when they go to an Oktoberfest featuring Grammy-winning nuclear polka band Brave Combo, Marge, who tries to go through the night without drinking, gives in and ends up drunk along with Homer. He tries to drive them home, but in a drunken stupor overturns the car.

In order to avoid an arrest, as his license will be revoked if he got charged with a DWI offence, Homer makes things look like Marge (who is drunker than he is) was the driver. She is arrested, but he bails her out. Later, Barney suggests that Marge go to a rehab clinic for a month, and when Marge is gone, Homer lets Ned Flanders take care of the kids. When he sees her at the clinic, he confesses, but Marge is angry and drinks again. Later on, the other rehab patients help her discover that she likes being with Homer more than she likes drinking, and forgives him and returns home, though she makes him promise to cut back on his drinking.

== Production ==
Series creator Matt Groening learned of Dallas-area band Brave Combo as a college-radio DJ in the 1980s and had commissioned the band to perform at "his best friend's wedding party", where Groening invited them to appear on the show. According to Carl Finch, founding member of the band, within two weeks, the network contacted them for video reference material for the animators for their "Springfield-yellow likenesses". The band recorded a polka arrangement of The Simpsons theme song and made the songs "Fill the Stein" and "Wilkommen Oktoberfest" for use in the Oktoberfest scene on the show. Finch was unsure how the band would look in the episode but thought that the band would only appear momentarily.

== Cultural references ==
Cosmic Wars and Randall Curtis are parodies of the Star Wars prequel trilogy and its director George Lucas; the parodies focus on negative reaction the films received, particularly the criticism of the character Jar Jar Binks, which is represented as "Jim-Jam", and the over-focus on politics. Curtis is also shown as living in rural Californian ranch which houses a high-tech visual effects workshop, a reference to Lucas' Skywalker Ranch. The giant robot in The Gathering Shadow, resembling an Imperial AT-AT, destroys the Galactic Senate.

== Reception ==
=== Viewing figures ===
This episode earned a 4.1 rating and was watched by 11.24 million viewers, which was the 22nd most watched show that week.

=== Critical response ===
The episode received generally negative reviews from critics. Many cited the scene where Homer purposely frames Marge for a DUI as an instance of the series jumping the shark.

On Four Finger Discount, Guy Davis and Brendan Dando thought the episode was the "shittiest episode" they had ever reviewed. They said that Homer putting Marge in the driver's seat to avoid a DUI was "un-fucking-forgivable".

James Greene of Nerve put the episode sixth on his list "Ten Times The Simpsons Jumped the Shark", singling out the storyline of Homer deliberately framing Marge for a crime he committed just to save his own skin. Greene remarked "This Homer wasn't a sometimes-insensitive-but-largely-sympathetic lug. He was just a douche." He did however like the "excellent" B-story, but found that it was "completely overshadowed by a very uncomfortable moment in the Simpson-Bouvier union."

The episode has been cited as a reason that Marge should leave Homer. Josh Kurp of Uproxx called it "the worst thing Homer's ever done to Marge". Anna Leszkiewicz of the New Statesman said, "I'm genuinely scared for her, what is happening to these once happy adults??"

Kotaku included the episode on its list of "the 10 Worst Simpsons Episodes Ever" in 2023.
