= The Regina Monologues =

- The Simpsons episode
- Promotional artwork for the episode featuring Queen Elizabeth II, J. K. Rowling, Tony Blair, Evan Marriott, Sir Ian McKellen and Edwina stuffing Homer into a Mini Hatch.
- Episode no.: Season 15; Episode 4
- Directed by: Mark Kirkland
- Written by: John Swartzwelder
- Production code: EABF22
- Original air date: November 23, 2003

Guest appearances
- Jane Leeves as Edwina; Tony Blair as himself; Evan Marriott as himself; Ian McKellen as himself; J. K. Rowling as herself

Episode features
- Couch gag: The back wall is a Play-Doh Fun Factory press that creates clay figures of the Simpsons.
- Commentary: Al Jean; Matt Selman; Tim Long; Don Payne; Kevin Curran; Michael Price; Tom Gammill; Max Pross; Mark Kirkland; David Silverman

Episode chronology
← Previous "The President Wore Pearls"	Next → "The Fat and the Furriest"
- The Simpsons season 15

"The Regina Monologues" is the fourth episode of the fifteenth season of the American animated television series The Simpsons. It originally aired on the Fox network in the United States on November 23, 2003. It was directed by Mark Kirkland and was the final episode written by John Swartzwelder. The episode sees the Simpson family travel to the United Kingdom for vacation. There, they meet several celebrities including Tony Blair, Evan Marriott, Ian McKellen, and J. K. Rowling, who all appear as themselves. Later, Homer is arrested and locked in the Tower of London for accidentally crashing into the Queen's carriage. Meanwhile, Abraham Simpson journeys to find Edwina, his long lost love, who is voiced by Jane Leeves.

== Plot ==
Mr. Burns withdraws a $1000 bill from an ATM, but he drops it and an updraft carries it away to the Simpsons' house, where it is found by Bart and Milhouse. Marge makes Bart and Homer put up fliers so that the person who lost the bill can reclaim it. No one can describe it correctly, so Lisa suggests that they spend the money on something for Marge. Marge desires a dream vacation, but decides against this because Homer always manages to ruin any trip they go on. After realizing he can make money from the bill, Bart displays it in a museum in his tree house. Mr. Burns visits and reclaims his money, forcing Bart to close his museum. However, Bart has made over $3000 from the museum, so he reconsiders Lisa's suggestion and decides to spend the money on a vacation for Marge. Grampa suggests they go to Britain, where he hopes to meet his long-lost love, Edwina. During World War II, he had sex with her the night before he was shipped out to the front lines on D-Day (having been unaware that he actually was).

Upon their arrival in London, the family is greeted by the then Prime Minister, Tony Blair, whom Homer mistakes for Mr. Bean. They visit London's tourist attractions, and later meet J. K. Rowling and Ian McKellen. Grampa tries to contact Edwina, whilst Bart and Lisa go on a "sugar rush" after discovering the joys of British candy. Homer and Marge rent a Mini Cooper and start to drive around London, but get stuck on the roundabout at Hyde Park Corner. After literally driving in circles for hours, Homer decides to break out of it, plows straight through the gates of Buckingham Palace and slams into Queen Elizabeth II's horse-drawn carriage, and is beaten by the Foot Guards.

At the Old Bailey, Homer is put on trial for causing harm to the Queen as well as wrecking her carriage. Representing himself (which Marge assumed would have made no difference), he humiliates himself by calling the Queen an impostor, since her luggage is inscribed "H.R.H." which he believes is short for "Henrietta R. Hippo", and mistaking the judge for a woman due to the wig he is wearing. The Queen, highly offended, demands that he be executed. At the Tower of London, where he awaits his execution, he is called from outside by his family and Lisa tells him that he can use a secret tunnel that Sir Walter Raleigh built to escape. However, the tunnel leads straight into the Queen's bedroom, and she calls her guards. Homer pleads with the Queen to find it in her heart to forgive him, and she allows him to leave the country on the condition that he and the rest of his family take Madonna back to America with him. As they prepare to leave, Edwina appears and introduces Abe to her daughter Abbey, who is essentially a female version of Homer. Realizing he is her father, Abe runs away quickly to the plane, while Homer and his half-sister are happy to meet each other.

== Production ==
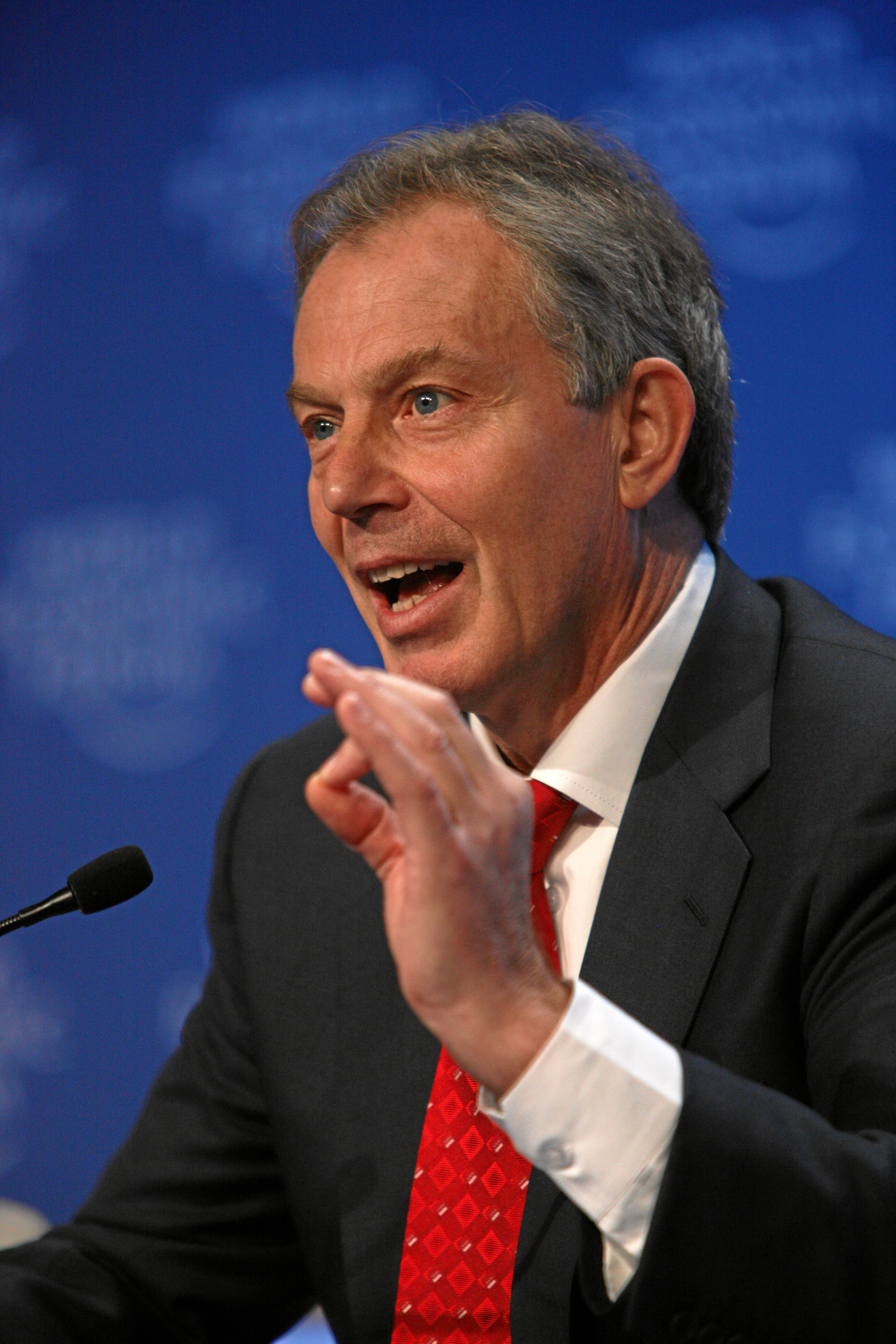
It took eight months of negotiation to get Tony Blair to guest star.

"The Regina Monologues" is the last episode written by longtime Simpsons writer John Swartzwelder (though Swartzwelder was credited for contributing to the script to the show's film). The title is a reference to Eve Ensler's play The Vagina Monologues, with "Regina" being the Latin word for "queen". The episode was directed by Mark Kirkland. The plot of Homer hitting the Queen's carriage was recycled from a spec script that previous Simpsons showrunning team Al Jean and Mike Reiss had pitched to The Golden Girls. In that script, Dorothy Zbornak was injured after a collision with Mother Teresa's car.

Tony Blair recorded his part for the episode in April 2003, in ten minutes at Downing Street. Blair was sent the script early on in the writing process, and it took eight months of negotiation between Fox and Blair's director of communications Alastair Campbell before Blair could appear as a guest star. In the original script, Blair was supposed to welcome the Simpsons to the United Kingdom "with a garland of 'genuine Newcastle coal' and hand [Marge] a complimentary Corgi", but Campbell had them changed, as Blair "made it very clear that he was only interested in doing the show if he could promote tourism in Britain". The show's staff did not know whether Blair would actually record his lines until showrunner Al Jean and his wife were in London promoting the 300th episode of The Simpsons. They received a call stating: "If you go over to Downing Street tomorrow and can promise to get the recording done in 15 minutes, then the Prime Minister will do it". Jean was "so nervous, it was ridiculous" when he met Blair, an event he has cited as "one of the most fantastic moments of his life". Blair was the top choice to guest star in the episode, but the staff did not think they had a chance to get him to appear.

Blair is the only head of government to guest star in the show, with Rudy Giuliani (who played himself in the episode "Stop, or My Dog Will Shoot!") the only other politician to guest star until Janet Reno voiced herself in the episode "Dark Knight Court." When Blair left office in 2007, it was reported that his successor as Prime Minister, Gordon Brown, was also being lined up to guest star on the show. Animator Dan Povenmire noted that American audiences would probably require subtitles to understand what Brown was saying. Voice actress Yeardley Smith noted that she would like Brown to appear in The Simpsons, but Brown ruled a guest role out, saying, "I don't think that is for me". Series creator Matt Groening confirmed that Brown would not be approached for a part, stating, "I think with Tony Blair we've reached our quota of British Prime Ministers we're going to have on the show. We have one per century – I think that's our rule. Sorry, Gordon Brown, it's too late!"}}

J. K. Rowling recorded her part via satellite from her home in Scotland, and Ian McKellen recorded his over the phone. Evan Marriott, contestant on the first season of Joe Millionaire appears as himself, while Jane Leeves plays Edwina. Manchester United soccer player Ryan Giggs is mentioned by Homer, something which Giggs thought was "brilliant".

The writers originally drew up a list of ten British celebrities they wanted to appear in the episode. The Archbishop of Canterbury Rowan Williams (a fan of the show) was included in a draft of the script acting as a tour guide and showing some of his relatives around London. Williams had to reject the part due to other engagements. The script also included a role for a musician; the staff had hoped to get David Bowie or Morrissey for the part but nothing came together. David and Victoria Beckham were also originally sought to guest star in the episode, and would be seen bickering on the street. The idea was dropped after Blair agreed to guest star, and it was deemed that they were not famous enough (as a married couple) in the United States and so were not approached. Jean commented "We thought about it, we didn't ask. I've heard of him because my daughter plays soccer."

== Reception ==
The episode originally aired on the Fox network in the United States on November 23, 2003, and on January 9, 2004, in the United Kingdom on Sky One. Since airing the episode has received mostly positive reviews from critics. IGN.com named the episode the best of the fifteenth season, saying that "It may not be the best episode ever, but hell if it isn't a lot of fun", as well as calling it "extremely funny" and a "high point for the past few seasons". Tony Blair received criticism from a number of commentators for his appearance in the episode as he recorded his part at the height of the war in Iraq. The Sunday Telegraph journalist Jack Roberts noted that it was "not [Blair's] finest hour". On the other hand, Simon Crerar of The Times named Blair's appearance as one of the 33 best guest appearances in the show's history, and the BBC classified his appearance as a "PR masterstroke". The episode is included on the Around the World in 80 D'ohs DVD.

The episode has become study material for sociology courses at University of California Berkeley, where it is used to "examine issues of the production and reception of cultural objects, in this case, a satirical cartoon show", and to figure out what it is "trying to tell audiences about aspects primarily of American society, and, to a lesser extent, about other societies". Some questions asked in the courses include:

• What aspects of American society are being addressed in the episode?
• What aspects of them are used to make the points?
• How is the satire conveyed: through language? Drawing? Music?
• Is the behavior of each character consistent with his/her character as developed over the years?
• Can we identify elements of the historical/political context that the writers are satirizing?
• What is the difference between satire and parody?
