= Margical History Tour =

- The Simpsons episode
- Episode no.: Season 15; Episode 11
- Directed by: Mike B. Anderson
- Written by: Brian Kelley
- Production code: FABF06
- Original air date: February 8, 2004

Episode features
- Couch gag: The couch is replaced by a giant microwave. Someone puts a tray inside and presses a button. The Simpsons rise from the tray as it cooks.
- Commentary: Al Jean; Brian Kelley; Ian Maxtone-Graham; Matt Selman; Tim Long; J. Stewart Burns; Tom Gammill; Max Pross; Mike B. Anderson

Episode chronology
← Previous "Diatribe of a Mad Housewife"	Next → "Milhouse Doesn't Live Here Anymore"
- The Simpsons season 15

"Margical History Tour" is the eleventh episode of the fifteenth season of the American animated television series The Simpsons. It first aired on the Fox network in the United States on February 8, 2004. The episode was written by Brian Kelley and directed by Mike B. Anderson.

In this episode, Marge tells Bart, Lisa, and Milhouse three stories about historic figures. The episode received mixed reviews.

== Plot ==
Bart, Lisa, and Milhouse go to the library to study but see that most of the books have been removed due to their unpopularity, so Marge tells them stories about history.

=== Henry VIII ===
Henry VIII (Homer) desires a male heir. He has a dream of a conversation with a son (Bart), who taunts him about his failure. When Anne Boleyn (Lindsay Naegle) promises to produce a son were she his wife, Margerine of Aragon (Marge) takes Henry to a marriage counselor (Dr. Hibbert) who encourages him to remain faithful but changes his mind after Henry threatens him. Sir Thomas More (Ned Flanders) protests that divorce is not permitted in the "Cath-diddly-athlic Church". The King says he will start his own church. More objects, prompting Henry to shoot him out of a cannon. Henry and Margarine explain their divorce to their daughter (Lisa), who says Henry's heir could be female but leaves when Henry threatens her.

Henry's new Church grants him his divorce, although Margerine's lawyer (the Blue-Haired Lawyer) forces him to give half his kingdom to Margerine. The Archbishop of Canterbury (Reverend Lovejoy), now head of the Church of England, officiates Henry's wedding to Anne. She bears Henry another daughter and is beheaded. Henry marries a total of six times, including to the squeaky-voiced Jane Seymour (Miss Springfield), the unattractive Anne of Cleves (Otto Mann), and the elderly Catherine Parr (Agnes Skinner), but fails to produce a son.

Years later, Henry is old and lying in his bed with Margerine by his side. He apologizes for locking her up and asks her to become his Queen again. Margerine accepts then smothers Henry with a pillow.

=== Lewis and Clark and Sacagawea ===
Meriwether Lewis (Lenny) and William Clark (Carl) are assigned to explore the West by President Thomas Jefferson (Mayor Quimby). They meet a Shoshone tribe, whose chief (Homer) offers them the guidance of his daughter, Sacagawea (Lisa). They are accompanied by her husband (Milhouse) until he is slaughtered by Sacagawea's brother (Bart).

Sacagawea gives them tips on how to survive the land but quickly tires of Lewis and Clark's stupidity. She leaves them and sets off back home. She encounters a mountain lion, but Lewis and Clark save her using her advice. The party arrives at the Pacific Ocean and a downpour begins, prompting Lewis and Clark to name the place Eugene, Oregon. The two explorers promises Sacagawea national recognition, but it is not until the present that she was retrospectively honored with the creation of the Sacagawea dollar.

=== Mozart and Salieri ===
Popular Wolfgang Amadeus Mozart (Bart) plays sonatas on the piano in Vienna and is pushed along by his father (Homer). Antonio Salieri (Lisa) is resentful of her brother's talents, especially when Mozart wins the award for best composer. At Mozart's flatulence-themed opera, The Musical Fruit, Salieri serves the Emperor (Mr. Burns) drugged wine. The opera is a success until the audience sees the Emperor asleep and mimics him, leaving Mozart stunned.

His failure leads to Mozart's fall from popularity, causing him to become deathly ill. At her brother's deathbed, Salieri says she wanted to ruin his life and not kill him, but then brings in Dr. Nick who puts leeches on Mozart's face to suck out blood. Mozart says he thought highly of Salieri's work, believing that it would be remembered more than his, but his youthful death ensures he and his music will be immortalized forever. He then dies. Salieri visits the Emperor's court to submit Mozart's Requiem as her own. The Emperor, however, is already focused on Ludwig van Beethoven (Nelson Muntz), whose performance of "Ode to Joy" on the piano prompts him to declare all other music obsolete. Beethoven laughs at Salieri. Crushed, Salieri throws the Requiem away and boards a carriage filled with lunatics.

=== Epilogue ===
Lisa says Marge's story of Mozart and Salieri is based upon the movie Amadeus and calls it inaccurate. Homer notes that the same actor starred in both Amadeus and in Animal House and begins singing the latter's theme.

== Cultural references ==
Some items seen in the library are Everybody Poops: The Video, Yu-Gi-Oh! Price Guides, and Itchy & Scratchy books on tape.

The title of the episode is a satire of The Beatles' movie, song, and album Magical Mystery Tour.

When King Henry first appears, he is gorging himself while singing the 1911 music hall song "I'm Henery the Eighth, I Am". The lyrics, however, are altered to refer to the King's enormous appetite and reputation for gluttony. Henry also wipes his face with Magna Carta, a document which limits the power of the Monarchy and forms the basis of the Constitution of the United Kingdom. During King Henry's dream about his son, a brief snatch of the song, "Greensleeves" can be heard. While in the marriage counselor's office, Henry is reading a magazine called The Yorker, a send-up of The New Yorker, until Margerine reminds him that they've come to talk about their problems. The Sir Thomas More subplot is a satire of Fred Zinnemann's Academy Award-winning film, A Man for All Seasons, starring Paul Scofield as Sir Thomas and Robert Shaw as King Henry. Later, in a dig at Tudor anti-Catholicism, Henry watches a Punch and Judy-style show in which Itchy & Scratchy accuse each other of conducting an illegal Catholic Mass and refusing to sign the Act of Supremacy.

As Lisa points out at the end of the episode, the Mozart segment is a satire of Peter Shaffer's stage play Amadeus and Miloš Forman's Academy Award-winning film of the same name. During Mozart's first concert, Otto Mann calls out a request for "Sonata in A, K.331". In reality, the K numbering system for Mozart's work was not introduced until 70 years after Mozart's death. Later, Salieri is compared to the three "untalented" Mozarts—Randy, Jermaine, and Tito from the Jackson Five. Mozart's opera "The Musical Fruit" is a satire of both The Magic Flute, and the children's song "Beans, Beans, the Musical Fruit," while the opera is sung to the tune of his composition Eine kleine Nachtmusik, which also plays over the closing credits. A fragment from the movement Lacrimosa from Mozart's Requiem can be heard while Mozart is dying. When Salieri arrives at the Imperial Palace, the Emperor is listening to Beethoven perform the Ode to Joy from his 9th Symphony on the piano. When the Emperor declares all other music obsolete, Beethoven points at Salieri and "Haw Haws" to the opening of his 5th Symphony.

The epilogue is similar to the one from Animal House.

== Reception ==
=== Viewing figures ===
The episode was watched by 8.87 million viewers, which was the 48th most-watched show that week.

=== Critical response ===
Colin Jacobson of DVD Movie Guide thought it was one of the better episodes of the season but thought the Amadeus segment was the worst of the episode.

On Four Finger Discount, Guy Davis and Brendan Dando thought it was a filler episode but liked the scene of Homer as Henry VIII’s dream of Bart as his son.

In 2021, Ben Sherlock of Screen Rant ranked this episode as one of the series' 10 best anthology episodes.
