= Bart-Mangled Banner =

- The Simpsons episode
- Episode no.: Season 15; Episode 21
- Directed by: Steven Dean Moore
- Written by: John Frink
- Production code: FABF17
- Original air date: May 16, 2004

Guest appearance
- Marcia Wallace as Edna Krabappel

Episode features
- Couch gag: The couch is replaced by a giant microwave. Someone puts a tray inside and presses a button. The Simpsons rise from the tray as it cooks.
- Commentary: Al Jean; John Frink; Matt Selman; Don Payne; Dana Gould; Michael Price; Tom Gammill; Max Pross; Steven Dean Moore

Episode chronology
← Previous "The Way We Weren't"	Next → "Fraudcast News"
- The Simpsons season 15

"Bart-Mangled Banner" is the twenty-first and penultimate episode of the fifteenth season of the American animated television series The Simpsons. It first aired on the Fox network in the United States on May 16, 2004. The episode was written by John Frink and directed by Steven Dean Moore.

In this episode, Bart accidentally disrespects the American flag, and the situation escalates until the United States hates Springfield and the Simpson family is arrested. The episode received mixed reviews.

== Plot ==
Homer and Marge take the kids to get their shots. Just before Dr. Hibbert is about to inject Bart, he escapes. After a chase through town, Hibbert finally outsmarts Bart, by having Barney (as well as Moe) wear a latex mask, and finally injects him. However, the shot causes Bart's earholes to swell shut as a side effect, making him temporarily deaf and Hibbert also tricks Homer into signing a malpractice waiver. Marge wants Bart to stay home from school; however, Bart wants to play in the donkey basketball game.

While at the Springfield Elementary School donkey basketball game, Bart taunts a donkey with a carrot, unaware that the school is reciting the national anthem. After he places the carrot in his shorts, the donkey takes it and literally eats Bart's shorts. While Bart is bent over to keep his privates covered with his shirt, the US flag is put up behind him and a photo is taken, which results in the crowd assuming that Bart is mooning the US flag. Shortly afterwards, the Springfield Shopper takes the story and completely turns it around, making it seem as if Bart had deliberately mooned the flag. Marge tries to convince Skinner that Bart was deaf at the time; however, because of Bart's history of similar pranks, Skinner is not convinced. Bart and his family soon are hated by all of Springfield.

The Simpsons are later asked to appear on a talk show and tell their side of the story. Homer advises Marge to not take it too far. However, due to the several misunderstandings, the host declares that Springfield hates the US. The US then turns their back on Springfield (though there is widespread celebration in praise of Springfield in the Middle East), so Mayor Quimby frantically decides to change the name of Springfield to "Libertyville." Everything in town is quickly patriotized; the traffic light colors are changed to red, white, and blue, everything costs $17.76., Apu starts selling Homeland Noodles with Uncle Sam Balls and changes his octuplets' names to "Lincoln", "Freedom", "Condoleezza", "Coke", "Pepsi", "Manifest Destiny", "Apple Pie" and "Superman", claiming their previous names to be "pre-witchhunt", and the family's last name to McGillicuddy. While at church, Lisa speaks her opinion about patriotism, and the Simpsons are arrested by SWAT, in violation of the "Government Knows Best Act."

The Simpsons are taken to the "Ronald Reagan Re-education Center", a prison which houses Michael Moore, the Dixie Chicks, Elmo, Al Franken, and Bill Clinton, as well as a man who moans "My only crime was driving a van full of explosives in from Canada!". Marge feels bad that she took it too far after Homer warned her not to. With some help from the last-registered Democrat, the Simpsons escape the prison (in a parody of the escape scene from The Blues Brothers), but realize that the re-education center is actually Alcatraz Prison. While they are swimming to land (choosing to swim to Oakland instead of San Francisco because they "aren't made of money"), they are picked up by a French freighter and are brought to France. They are well adjusted, but still miss the United States, mainly because it is where all their stuff is. They then move back to the US dressed as 19th century immigrants from Europe where Homer speaks of plans of integration into the United States.

== Cultural references ==
At church, Lisa talks about the First Amendment to the United States Constitution, part of the United States Bill of Rights. After the family is arrested, they are made to watch a cartoon that describes the Bill of Rights as the Constitution's "crazy drunken cousin".

The cable debate show Headbutt that the Simpsons appear on is a reference to the CNN debate show Crossfire with Nash Castor being a parody of then-current host Tucker Carlson.

== Reception ==
=== Viewing figures ===
The episode earned a 3.2 rating and was watched by 8.69 million viewers, the 46th most-watched show that week.

=== Critical response ===
Colin Jacobson of DVD Movie Guide thought the episode may have had more impact at the time it aired, but thought the episode was "heavy-handed and shrill" eight years later. He liked the episode until it started the social commentary.

On Four Finger Discount, Brendan Dando thought the episode had "no direction" where the events spiral out of control while Guy Davis thought the episode reflected the time after the September 11 attacks where comedians thought they needed to comment on the aftermath.

=== Themes and analysis ===
The episode was seen to be a reaction to the Dixie Chicks' remarks about George W. Bush in 2003 that were perceived to be unpatriotic. Matthew A. Henry writes that the episode was a satire of the incident with the Dixie Chicks that escalated to national news and their music being banned from radio stations. In this episode, an incident of Bart disrespecting the American flag leads to the Simpsons family being hated and Marge shocking the country by saying she hates Americans.
