= My Mother the Carjacker =

- The Simpsons episode
- Episode no.: Season 15; Episode 2
- Directed by: Nancy Kruse
- Written by: Michael Price
- Production code: EABF18
- Original air date: November 9, 2003

Guest appearance
- Glenn Close as Mona Simpson

Episode features
- Couch gag: The Simpsons sit on the couch as normal, but then begin to decay and turn to dust.
- Commentary: Al Jean; Michael Price; Matt Selman; Tom Gammill; Max Pross; Marc Wilmore; Dan Castellaneta

Episode chronology
← Previous "Treehouse of Horror XIV"	Next → "The President Wore Pearls"
- The Simpsons season 15

"My Mother the Carjacker" is the second episode of the fifteenth season of the American animated television series The Simpsons. It first aired on the Fox network in the United States on November 9, 2003. It was written by Michael Price and directed by Nancy Kruse.

In the episode, Homer receives a cryptic message in the newspaper informing him to come to a certain place at midnight, and soon discovers that the person who wrote the message is his mother, Mona Simpson. Glenn Close makes her second of eleven guest spots as Homer's mother. It has a direct link from the season seven episode "Mother Simpson". It was nominated for a Writers Guild of America Award in 2004. In its original run, the episode received 12.4 million viewers. It received mixed reviews.

== Plot ==
On Kent Brockman's Channel Six "Oops Patrol" segment, he displays a humorous headline ("Mayor Unveils Erection to Cheering Crowd"), noticed and submitted by Marge, for which she receives a free T-shirt and other perks from the town. An envious Homer, after trying on and stretching out Marge's shirt, attempts to find his own funny headline so he too can win a T-shirt. Homer spends the following night with newspapers plastered over his bedroom wall, exhausting himself in his search. He finds an article entitled "World's Biggest Pizza". The first letters of each line spell out an invitation for Homer to meet someone at Fourth Street Overpass at midnight. He wakes Bart so they can both go. When they reach the overpass, the mystery person reveals herself to be Mona Simpson, Homer's mother.

At the Overpass Diner, Mona explains that the government is still hunting her because of her crime of sabotaging Mr. Burns' germ warfare lab. Her nostalgia aroused by a macaroni pencil case Homer had made for her when he was five, her liberal links at the Springfield Shopper published the story of the giant pizza to lure Homer. Chief Wiggum, Lou, and Eddie arrive at the diner, and Lou recognizes Mona. Waitress Hora lets Homer, Mona, and Bart escape through the back after they increase her tip. After they drive off, Homer rams into the police station, where Mona is arrested. At the trial, during which it is implied by Homer afterwards that Mona's ex-husband Grampa testifies against her, Homer is put on the stand and, after a long clueless pause, gives a heartfelt request that they do not take his mother away from him again. The jury, deeply moved, acquit Mona, much to Burns' fury.

Mona catches up on Homer's missed childhood; giving Homer a bath, watching Homer in the school play, knitting for Homer, teaching Homer how to ride a bike, and seeing a reenactment of the birth of Bart. To make Mona more welcome, Homer steals a whole room from Ned Flanders's house so she can have her own private bedroom. Burns renames his Germ Warfare Laboratory the "Grandma Simpson Peace Museum and Kid-teractive Learnatorium" to a crowd of cheering onlookers. Burns asks Mona to be the first to sign the museum's guest book. However, it is revealed to be a confessional trap when after signing the document, Mona says to Burns that she signed under false names while at national parks, which is a federal offense. Federal agents jump out and arrest her. Lisa tells Homer she disagrees with what the government did with Mona, and unintentionally gives Homer the idea to break Mona out of prison.

The next day, Homer and Bart trick the bus which is transferring female convicts to prison into pulling over by changing a sign overhead to display a warning of a snowstorm ahead. As the drivers get off to put chains on the tires, Homer steals the bus and liberates the convicts as the police give chase. Not wanting Homer to be imprisoned and leave his children like she did, Mona tases him and pushes him out of the bus onto an abandoned bed. Homer watches as the bus flies off a cliff into a lake, where it explodes and is covered by a rockslide.

The Simpsons hold a funeral for Mona and pay their respects, but the coffin (filled with last week's garbage) suddenly slides away and into a forest. Later at night, Homer pores over newspaper headlines and finds an article in which the first letter of each row spells out "IMOK" over the front and back side of the page. Taking this to be another message from his mother that she is still alive, he goes to sleep. However, he overlooks an article about a giant taco, in which Mona encoded a long message that explains she escaped from the bus before it crashed and hitched a ride out of town.

== Cultural references ==
The title is a reference to the TV series My Mother the Car. The song Mona sings with the convicts is "I Fought the Law". The song played during the '60s montage is Jimi Hendrix's version of "All Along the Watchtower". The montage concludes with John Wayne as a guest on Rowan and Martin's Laugh-In saying "You bet your sweet bippy", a catch phrase of the show. During the scenes with Homer re-enacting his childhood for his mother, the song being played is "Mother and Child Reunion" by Paul Simon. When Homer is having prints of pictures of his mother made, the song played is "Mother" by John Lennon. Homer's line of "Bless the loom that fruited you" is a reference to Fruit of the Loom. Homer's line of "We'll hide you where there's no people – Disney California Adventure Park" is a reference to how a park in Disneyland had poor attendance. The scene of the Homer pinning newspapers to the wall and letters jumping out and deciphering hidden messages is a homage to similar scenes in A Beautiful Mind. When Homer is showing the family headlines is a parody of the "Headlines" segment on The Tonight Show with Jay Leno. Also, Lisa says "Don't go inside! It's a trap!", which is a reference of Admiral Ackbar's famous line, said in Return of the Jedi.

== Reception ==
=== Viewing figures ===
During its original run, the episode gained 12.4 million viewers, losing to a rerun of "Three Gays of the Condo" (12.6).

=== Critical response ===
Colin Jacobson of DVD Movie Guide said the episode was not as good as the previous episode and "more emotional than most" episodes. However, he thought it was a "reasonably satisfying program".

On Four Finger Discount, Brendan Dando and Guy Davis liked the performance by Glenn Close but thought the plot was a repeat of her previous appearance.

IGN ranks Glenn Close's performances as the twenty-fifth best guest appearances in the show's history.

=== Awards and nominations ===
Writer Michael Price was nominated for the Writers Guild of America Award for Television: Animation for this episode at the 56th Writers Guild of America Awards.
