= Bob Anderson (director) =

American animation director

- Education: Joe Kubert School
- Occupation: Animation director

Bob Anderson is an American animation director on The Simpsons. He also contributed additional sequence direction on The Simpsons Movie.

After high school, Anderson enrolled at the Joe Kubert School of Cartoon and Graphic Art to pursue an education in animation. He began his professional career before graduating from the Joe Kubert School. Hired by Broadcast Arts in New York City, he started work on a variety of commercials.

In 1990, Anderson moved to Los Angeles to work as an assistant director for The Simpsons. In the fifth season, after fourteen episodes as an assistant to Jim Reardon and one episode for Mark Kirkland, he made his directorial debut with the episode "Bart's Inner Child" in 1993.

== The Simpsons episodes ==
He has directed the following episodes:

- "Bart's Inner Child"
- "Sweet Seymour Skinner's Baadasssss Song"
- "Lisa on Ice"
- "Bart's Comet"
- "Two Dozen and One Greyhounds"
- "Treehouse of Horror VI"
- "Hurricane Neddy"
- "Homer vs. the Eighteenth Amendment"
- "Miracle on Evergreen Terrace"
- "Lisa Gets an 'A'"
- "I'm with Cupid"
- "E-I-E-I-(Annoyed Grunt)"
- "Insane Clown Poppy"
- "Pokey Mom"
- "Simpsons Tall Tales"
- "The Lastest Gun in the West"
- "Special Edna"
- "Old Yeller Belly"
- "Marge vs. Singles, Seniors, Childless Couples and Teens, and Gays"
- "Co-Dependents' Day"
- "Fraudcast News"
- "On a Clear Day I Can't See My Sister"
- "Home Away from Homer"
- "My Fair Laddy"
- "Marge and Homer Turn a Couple Play"
- "Kill Gil: Vols. 1 & 2"
- "Marge Gamer"
- "I Don't Wanna Know Why the Caged Bird Sings"
- "Dial 'N' for Nerder"
- "Treehouse of Horror XIX"
- "Rednecks and Broomsticks"
- "American History X-cellent"
- "Treehouse of Horror XXI" as "SpongeBob Anderson Pants"
- "The Fight Before Christmas"
- "The Blue and the Gray"
- "500 Keys"
- "The Book Job"
- "Moe Goes from Rags to Riches"
- "The Spy Who Learned Me"
- "Moonshine River"
- "The Changing of the Guardian"
- "The Fabulous Faker Boy"
- "Homerland"
- "Yellow Subterfuge"
- "Days of Future Future"
- "Simpsorama"
- "Bart's New Friend"
- "The Kids Are All Fight"
- "Lisa with an 'S'"
- "Much Apu About Something"
- "How Lisa Got Her Marge Back"
- "Havana Wild Weekend"
- "The Last Traction Hero"
- "A Father's Watch"
- "Grampy Can Ya Hear Me"
- "Haw-Haw Land"
- "Lisa Gets the Blues"
- "Bart's Not Dead"
- "The Winter of Our Monetized Content"
- "The Incredible Lightness of Being a Baby"
- "Warrin' Priests"
- "Undercover Burns"
- "Boyz N the Highlands"
- "Meat Is Murder"
- "The Many Saints of Springfield"
- "Homer's Adventures Through the Windshield Glass"
