= 57th Writers Guild of America Awards =

57th WGA Awards
- Date: February 19, 2005
- Organized by: Writers Guild of America, East and the Writers Guild of America, West

Highlights
- Best Adapted Screenplay: Sideways

The 57th Writers Guild of America Awards, given on February 19, 2005, honored the film and television best writers of 2004.

== Winners and nominees ==
=== Film ===
==== Adapted Screenplay ====
Sideways - Alexander Payne and Jim Taylor †

- Before Sunset - Richard Linklater, Julie Delpy, Ethan Hawke and Kim Krizan
- Mean Girls - Tina Fey
- Million Dollar Baby - Paul Haggis
- The Motorcycle Diaries (Diarios de motocicleta) - José Rivera

==== Original Screenplay ====
Eternal Sunshine of the Spotless Mind - Pierre Bismuth, Michel Gondry and Charlie Kaufman †

- The Aviator - John Logan
- Garden State - Zach Braff
- Hotel Rwanda - Keir Pearson and Terry George
- Kinsey - Bill Condon

==== Documentary Screenplay ====
Super Size Me - Morgan Spurlock

- Bright Leaves - Ross McElwee
- Control Room - Julia Bacha and Jehane Noujaim
- Home of the Brave - Paola di Florio
- The Hunting of the President - Harry Thomason and Nickolas Perry
- In the Realms of the Unreal - Jessica Yu

=== Television ===
==== Best Episodic Drama ====
"The Supremes" - The West Wing - Debora Cahn

- "Falling Into Place" - Six Feet Under - Craig Wright
- "Long Term Parking" - The Sopranos - Terence Winter
- "Memorial Day" - The West Wing - John Sacret Young and Josh Singer

==== Best Episodic Comedy ====
"Pier Pressure" - Arrested Development - James Vallely and Mitch Hurwitz
"Ida's Boyfriend" - Malcolm in the Middle - Neil Thompson

- "Splat!" - Sex and the City - Jenny Bicks and Cindy Chupack
- "The Ick Factor" - Sex and the City - Julie Rottenberg and Elisa Zuritsky
- "Pilot" - Wonderfalls - Bryan Fuller and Todd Holland

- Best Animation Screenplay:
  - The Simpsons - "Catch 'Em If You Can"
- Best Daytime Serial:
- The Guiding Light
