= Mike B. Anderson =

American television director (born 1954/5)

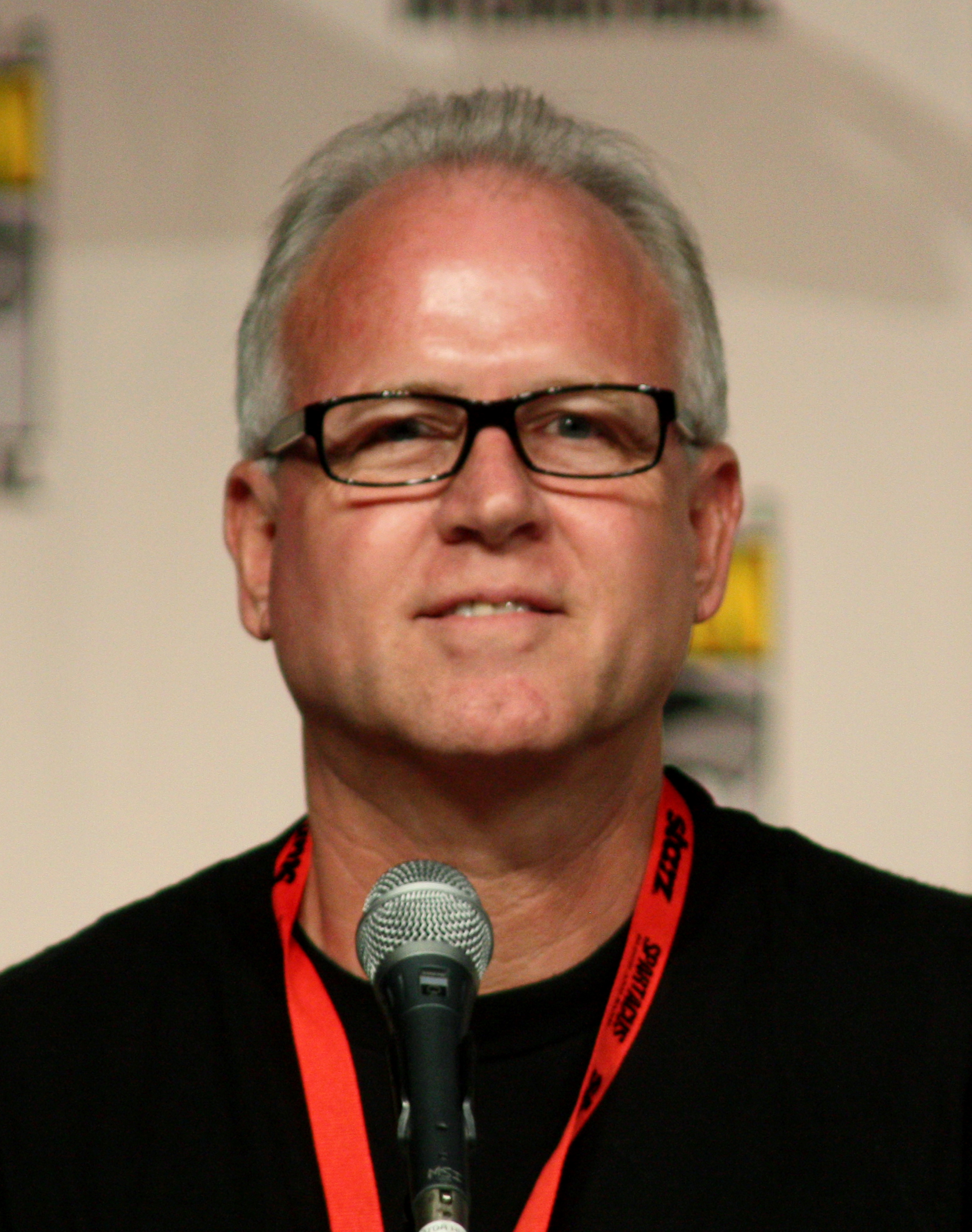
- Anderson in 2009
- Born: 1954 or 1955 (age 70–71)
- Other name: Mikel B. Anderson
- Education: California College of Arts and Crafts; University of California, Los Angeles
- Occupation: Animation director
- Years active: 1980s–present
- Known for: The Simpsons

Mike B. Anderson (born 1954 or 1955), sometimes credited as Mikel B. Anderson, is an American animation director, best known for his work on The Simpsons.

== Biography ==
Anderson grew up in Santa Maria, California. He dropped out of high school, later earning a GED before attending college. He holds a BFA degree from the California College of Arts and Crafts, and master's degrees in film and video production from UCLA. After college, he directed short films and low-budget features before joining The Simpsons as a background artist in 1990. He was promoted to assistant director in 1992 and director in 1995.

Anderson has directed numerous episodes of the show, and was animated in "The Secret War of Lisa Simpson" as cadet Anderson. While a college student, he directed the live action feature films Alone in the T-Shirt Zone and Kamillions. Since 1990, he has worked primarily in animation including being a consulting producer on the series, The Oblongs, and story consultant on Tripping the Rift.

He has won two Emmy Awards for directing Simpsons episodes, "Homer's Phobia" in 1997 and "HOMR" in 2001. For "Homer's Phobia" he won the Annie Award for Best Individual Achievement: Directing in a TV Production, and the WAC Winner Best Director for Primetime Series at the 1998 World Animation Celebration. Mike was also a sequence director on "The Simpsons Movie" (2007), was the supervising director on "The Simpsons Ride" at Universal Studios and has been the supervising director for "The Simpsons" television series since season 20.

== The Simpsons episodes directed by Anderson ==
=== Season 7 ===
- "Lisa the Iconoclast"

=== Season 8 ===
- "Treehouse of Horror VII"
- "You Only Move Twice"
- "Homer's Phobia"
- "The Secret War of Lisa Simpson"

=== Season 9 ===
- "The Last Temptation of Krust"

=== Season 10 ===
- "Homer Simpson in: 'Kidney Trouble'"

=== Season 11 ===
- "Hello Gutter, Hello Fadder"

=== Season 12 ===
- "HOMR"
- "Trilogy of Error"

=== Season 13 ===
- "Tales from the Public Domain"

=== Season 14 ===
- "How I Spent My Strummer Vacation"
- "C.E. D'oh"

=== Season 15 ===
- "The President Wore Pearls"
- "Margical History Tour"
- "The Way We Weren't"

=== Season 16 ===
- "Fat Man and Little Boy"
- "Pranksta Rap"
- "Future-Drama"

=== Season 17 ===
- "Marge's Son Poisoning"
- "Homer's Paternity Coot"
- "The Wettest Stories Ever Told"

=== Season 18 ===
- "Please Homer, Don't Hammer 'Em..."

=== Season 19 ===
- "Mona Leaves-a"

=== Season 21 ===
- "Treehouse of Horror XX"

=== Season 27 ===
- "Halloween of Horror"
