= Matt Warburton =

American television writer (born 1978)

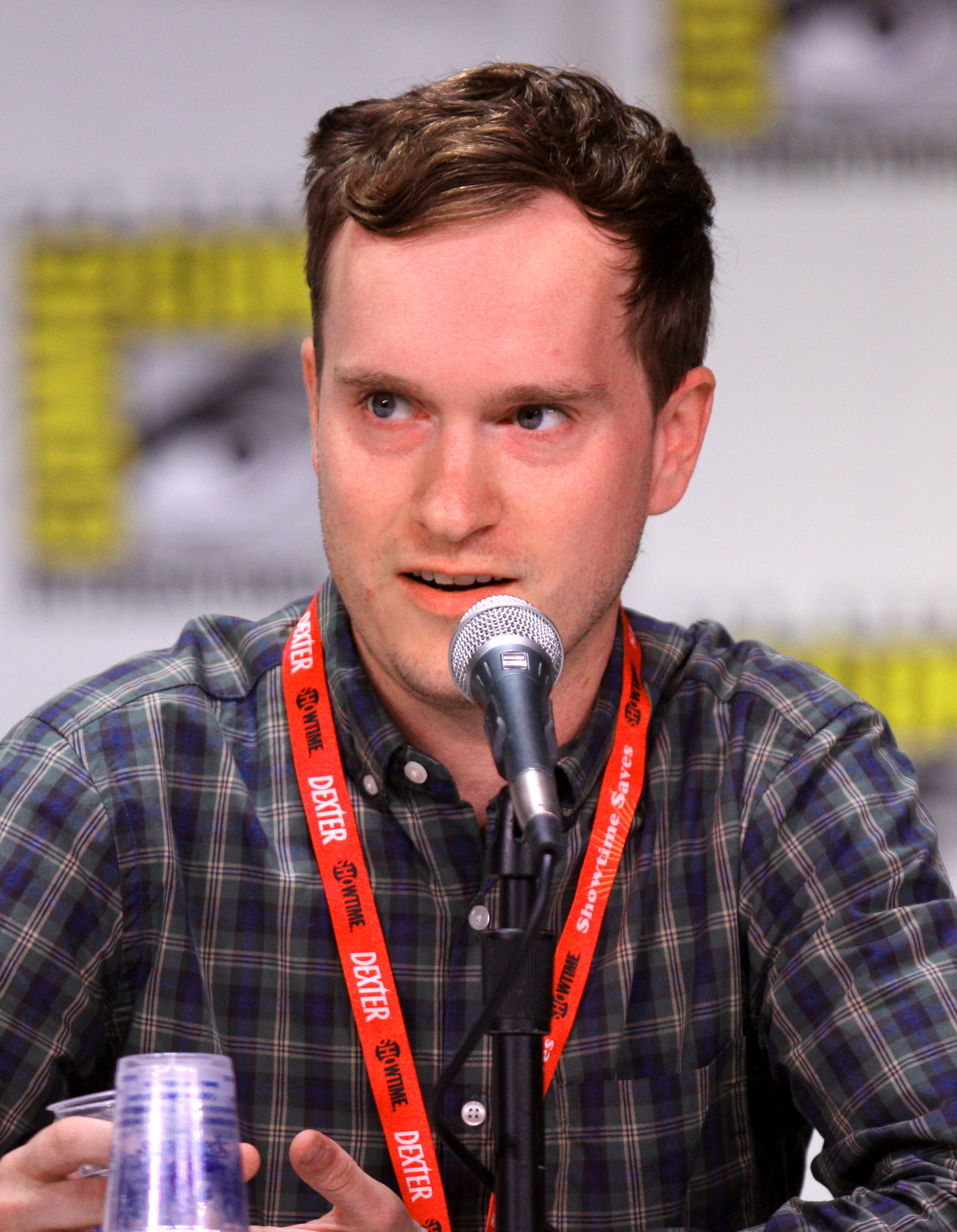
- Warburton at The Simpsons panel of the 2012 San Diego Comic-Con
- Born: Matthew Warburton; February 7, 1978 (age 48); Strongsville, Ohio, U.S.
- Education: Harvard University
- Occupation: Television writer

Matthew Warburton (born February 7, 1978) is an American television writer.

== Early life ==
Matthew Warburton was born on February 7, 1978, in Strongsville, grew up in northern Ohio and attended Strongsville High School. He has a degree in cognitive neuroscience from Harvard University.

== Career ==
Warburton worked for 11 years as a writer and co-executive producer on the Fox animated series The Simpsons, leaving the show in December 2012. He worked as a writer (consulting editor) on the NBC comedy series Community, joining during the show's third season and then became executive producer and writer for the Fox comedy The Mindy Project.

=== Work ===
==== The Simpsons episodes ====
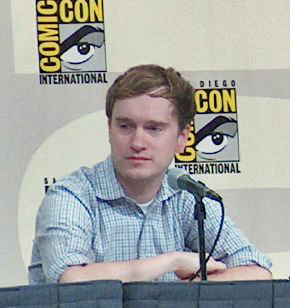
Warburton in July 2008

- "Tales from the Public Domain" (Do the Bard, Man) (2002)
- "Three Gays of the Condo" (2003)
- "Co-Dependents' Day" (2004)
- "The Father, the Son, and the Holy Guest Star" (2005)
- "Please Homer, Don't Hammer 'Em..." (2006)
- "Moe'N'a Lisa" (2006)
- "Springfield Up" (2007)
- "Treehouse of Horror XIX" (2008)
- "The Squirt and the Whale" (2010)
- "The Great Simpsina" (2011)
- "A Totally Fun Thing That Bart Will Never Do Again" (2012)

==== Community episodes ====
- Digital Estate Planning (2012)

==== The Mindy Project episodes ====
- "In The Club" (2012)
- "Danny's Friend" (2012)
- "Music Festival" (2013)
- "Crimes & Misdeamors & Ex-BFs" (2014)
- "Danny Castellano Is My Nutrionist" (2015)
- "C Is For Coward" (2015)
- "The Parent Trap" (2015)
- "When Mindy Met Danny" (2015)
- "Will They or Won't They" (2016)
- "Bernardo & Anita" (2016)
- "Nurses Strike" (2016)
- "Hot Mess Time Machine" (2017)
- "May Divorce Be With You" (2017)
- "Danny in Real Life" (2017)
- "It Had To Be You" (2017)

==== Champions episodes ====
- "Vincemas" (2018)
- "Nepotism" (2018)

==== Four Weddings and a Funeral episodes ====
- "Kash with a K" (2019)
- "We Broke" (2019)
- "New Jersey" (2019)

==== The Sex Lives of College Girls episodes ====
- That Comment Tho (2021)

== Awards ==
Year	Nominated for	Award	Category	Result
2003	The Simpsons: Three Gays of the Condo	Primetime Emmy Award	Outstanding Animated Program	Won
2005	"The Father, the Son, and the Holy Guest Star" – The Simpsons	Writers Guild of America Awards	Outstanding Writing in Animation	Nominated
