= List of Later with Greg Kinnear episodes (1994) =

This is the list of episodes for Later with Greg Kinnear in 1994.

== 1994 ==
=== February–March ===
No.	Original release date	Guest(s)
1	February 28, 1994	Julia Louis-Dreyfus

No.	Original release date	Guest(s)
2	March 1, 1994	Martin Short

No.	Original release date	Guest(s)
3	March 2, 1994	Phil Hartman

No.	Original release date	Guest(s)
4	March 3, 1994	George Carlin

No.	Original release date	Guest(s)
5	March 7, 1994	John Caponera

No.	Original release date	Guest(s)
6	March 8, 1994	Marilu Henner

No.	Original release date	Guest(s)
7	March 9, 1994	Ben Stiller

No.	Original release date	Guest(s)
8	March 10, 1994	Paul Hogan

No.	Original release date	Guest(s)
9	March 14, 1994	Courtney Thorne-Smith

No.	Original release date	Guest(s)
10	March 15, 1994	Roseanne Barr

No.	Original release date	Guest(s)
11	March 16, 1994	Harry Shearer

No.	Original release date	Guest(s)
12	March 17, 1994	Kevin Spacey

No.	Original release date	Guest(s)
13	March 21, 1994	Peter Frampton

No.	Original release date	Guest(s)
14	March 22, 1994	Ron Reagan

No.	Original release date	Guest(s)
15	March 23, 1994	Rip Torn

No.	Original release date	Guest(s)
16	March 24, 1994	Montel Williams

No.	Original release date	Guest(s)
17	March 28, 1994	Henry Jaglom

No.	Original release date	Guest(s)
18	March 29, 1994	Dan Cortese

No.	Original release date	Guest(s)
19	March 30, 1994	Tim Daly

No.	Original release date	Guest(s)
20	March 31, 1994	Ellen DeGeneres

=== April ===
No.	Original release date	Guest(s)
21	April 4, 1994	Tom Arnold

No.	Original release date	Guest(s)
22	April 5, 1994	Kathy Najimy

No.	Original release date	Guest(s)
23	April 6, 1994	Charlton Heston

No.	Original release date	Guest(s)
24	April 7, 1994	Richard Marx

No.	Original release date	Guest(s)
25	April 11, 1994	Martin Mull

No.	Original release date	Guest(s)
26	April 12, 1994	Joe Pesci

No.	Original release date	Guest(s)
27	April 13, 1994	Carrie Fisher

No.	Original release date	Guest(s)
28	April 14, 1994	Norman Lear

No.	Original release date	Guest(s)
29	April 25, 1994	Fran Drescher

No.	Original release date	Guest(s)
30	April 26, 1994	Paul Rodriguez

No.	Original release date	Guest(s)
31	April 27, 1994	Richard Simmons

No.	Original release date	Guest(s)
32	April 28, 1994	Louis Gossett Jr.

=== May ===
No.	Original release date	Guest(s)
33	May 2, 1994	Robert Wagner

No.	Original release date	Guest(s)
34	May 3, 1994	Ray Liotta

No.	Original release date	Guest(s)
35	May 4, 1994	Rita Rudner

No.	Original release date	Guest(s)
36	May 5, 1994	Katey Sagal

No.	Original release date	Guest(s)
37	May 9, 1994	James Coburn

No.	Original release date	Guest(s)
38	May 10, 1994	Jacqueline Bisset

No.	Original release date	Guest(s)
39	May 11, 1994	David Copperfield

No.	Original release date	Guest(s)
40	May 12, 1994	Clint Black

No.	Original release date	Guest(s)
41	May 16, 1994	Kevin Pollak

No.	Original release date	Guest(s)
42	May 17, 1994	Timothy Leary

No.	Original release date	Guest(s)
43	May 18, 1994	Gloria Steinem

No.	Original release date	Guest(s)
44	May 19, 1994	Dave Thomas

No.	Original release date	Guest(s)
45	May 23, 1994	Penny Marshall

No.	Original release date	Guest(s)
46	May 24, 1994	Al Michaels

No.	Original release date	Guest(s)
47	May 25, 1994	Bill Maher

No.	Original release date	Guest(s)
48	May 26, 1994	Cheech Marin

No.	Original release date	Guest(s)
49	May 31, 1994	Mark Wahlberg

=== June ===
No.	Original release date	Guest(s)
50	June 1, 1994	Peggy Noonan

No.	Original release date	Guest(s)
51	June 2, 1994	Carol Alt

No.	Original release date	Guest(s)
52	June 6, 1994	Jeffrey Tambor

No.	Original release date	Guest(s)
53	June 7, 1994	Tom Snyder

No.	Original release date	Guest(s)
54	June 8, 1994	Louie Anderson

No.	Original release date	Guest(s)
55	June 9, 1994	John Landis

No.	Original release date	Guest(s)
56	June 13, 1994	Daphne Zuniga

No.	Original release date	Guest(s)
57	June 14, 1994	Kelsey Grammer

No.	Original release date	Guest(s)
58	June 15, 1994	Mark Harmon

No.	Original release date	Guest(s)
59	June 16, 1994	Patrick Stewart

No.	Original release date	Guest(s)
60	June 20, 1994	Dennis Franz

No.	Original release date	Guest(s)
61	June 21, 1994	Danny Elfman

No.	Original release date	Guest(s)
62	June 22, 1994	Harry Shearer

No.	Original release date	Guest(s)
63	June 23, 1994	Joe Mantegna

=== July ===
No.	Original release date	Guest(s)
64	July 5, 1994	Bobcat Goldthwait

No.	Original release date	Guest(s)
65	July 6, 1994	Griffin Dunne

No.	Original release date	Guest(s)
66	July 7, 1994	James Brown

No.	Original release date	Guest(s)
67	July 11, 1994	David Cassidy

No.	Original release date	Guest(s)
68	July 12, 1994	Larry Miller

No.	Original release date	Guest(s)
69	July 13, 1994	Helen Slater

No.	Original release date	Guest(s)
70	July 14, 1994	Dick Cavett

No.	Original release date	Guest(s)
71	July 18, 1994	Patti LaBelle

No.	Original release date	Guest(s)
72	July 19, 1994	Roger Clinton

No.	Original release date	Guest(s)
73	July 20, 1994	Julia Sweeney

No.	Original release date	Guest(s)
74	July 21, 1994	Gary Sinise

=== August ===
No.	Original release date	Guest(s)
75	August 1, 1994	Peter Riegert

No.	Original release date	Guest(s)
76	August 2, 1994	Steve Allen

No.	Original release date	Guest(s)
77	August 3, 1994	Kris Kristofferson

No.	Original release date	Guest(s)
78	August 4, 1994	Dennis Rodman

No.	Original release date	Guest(s)
79	August 8, 1994	Robin Leach

No.	Original release date	Guest(s)
80	August 9, 1994	Howie Mandel

No.	Original release date	Guest(s)
81	August 10, 1994	Richard Benjamin

No.	Original release date	Guest(s)
82	August 11, 1994	Marie Osmond

No.	Original release date	Guest(s)
83	August 15, 1994	Bob Costas

No.	Original release date	Guest(s)
84	August 16, 1994	Eric Stoltz

No.	Original release date	Guest(s)
85	August 17, 1994	Keith Carradine

No.	Original release date	Guest(s)
86	August 18, 1994	Kennedy

No.	Original release date	Guest(s)
87	August 22, 1994	David Alan Grier

No.	Original release date	Guest(s)
88	August 23, 1994	Crosby, Stills & Nash

No.	Original release date	Guest(s)
89	August 24, 1994	Kirk Douglas

No.	Original release date	Guest(s)
90	August 25, 1994	Tori Amos

=== September ===
No.	Original release date	Guest(s)
91	September 5, 1994	Paula Poundstone

No.	Original release date	Guest(s)
92	September 6, 1994	Danny Aiello

No.	Original release date	Guest(s)
93	September 7, 1994	Sandra Bernhard

No.	Original release date	Guest(s)
94	September 8, 1994	Michael Moore

No.	Original release date	Guest(s)
95	September 12, 1994	Marilu Henner

No.	Original release date	Guest(s)
96	September 13, 1994	Harvey Fierstein

No.	Original release date	Guest(s)
97	September 14, 1994	Crystal Bernard

No.	Original release date	Guest(s)
98	September 15, 1994	Jay Leno

No.	Original release date	Guest(s)
99	September 19, 1994	Melissa Etheridge

No.	Original release date	Guest(s)
100	September 20, 1994	Suzanne Somers

No.	Original release date	Guest(s)
101	September 21, 1994	Randy Travis

No.	Original release date	Guest(s)
102	September 26, 1994	Bret Easton Ellis

No.	Original release date	Guest(s)
103	September 27, 1994	Christina Applegate

No.	Original release date	Guest(s)
104	September 28, 1994	Courteney Cox

No.	Original release date	Guest(s)
105	September 29, 1994	Lou Diamond Phillips

=== October ===
No.	Original release date	Guest(s)
106	October 3, 1994	Margaret Cho

No.	Original release date	Guest(s)
107	October 4, 1994	Ed McMahon

No.	Original release date	Guest(s)
108	October 5, 1994	Robert Evans

No.	Original release date	Guest(s)
109	October 6, 1994	Rosie O'Donnell

No.	Original release date	Guest(s)
110	October 11, 1994	Bonnie Hunt

No.	Original release date	Guest(s)
111	October 12, 1994	David Brenner

No.	Original release date	Guest(s)
112	October 13, 1994	Garry Marshall

No.	Original release date	Guest(s)
113	October 17, 1994	Robert Englund

No.	Original release date	Guest(s)
114	October 18, 1994	Martin Landau

No.	Original release date	Guest(s)
115	October 19, 1994	Teri Hatcher

No.	Original release date	Guest(s)
116	October 20, 1994	Jennifer Tilly

No.	Original release date	Guest(s)
117	October 24, 1994	Dick Clark

No.	Original release date	Guest(s)
118	October 25, 1994	Bob Saget

No.	Original release date	Guest(s)
119	October 26, 1994	Dennis Rodman

No.	Original release date	Guest(s)
120	October 27, 1994	James Brown

=== November ===
No.	Original release date	Guest(s)
121	November 7, 1994	Tom Skerritt

No.	Original release date	Guest(s)
122	November 8, 1994	Fran Lebowitz

No.	Original release date	Guest(s)
123	November 9, 1994	George Clooney

No.	Original release date	Guest(s)
124	November 10, 1994	Melissa Gilbert

No.	Original release date	Guest(s)
125	November 14, 1994	Larry King

No.	Original release date	Guest(s)
126	November 15, 1994	Merrill Markoe

No.	Original release date	Guest(s)
127	November 16, 1994	Camille Paglia

No.	Original release date	Guest(s)
128	November 17, 1994	Pamela Anderson

No.	Original release date	Guest(s)
129	November 21, 1994	Henry Rollins

No.	Original release date	Guest(s)
130	November 22, 1994	Pauly Shore

No.	Original release date	Guest(s)
131	November 23, 1994	Berry Gordy

No.	Original release date	Guest(s)
132	November 24, 1994	Willie Nelson

No.	Original release date	Guest(s)
133	November 28, 1994	Kenny Loggins

No.	Original release date	Guest(s)
134	November 29, 1994	Jane Leeves

No.	Original release date	Guest(s)
135	November 30, 1994	Gary Busey

=== December ===
No.	Original release date	Guest(s)
136	December 1, 1994	Michael Nesmith

No.	Original release date	Guest(s)
137	December 12, 1994	Fyvush Finkel

No.	Original release date	Guest(s)
138	December 13, 1994	Larry Miller

No.	Original release date	Guest(s)
139	December 14, 1994	Henry Winkler

No.	Original release date	Guest(s)
140	December 15, 1994	Penelope Ann Miller

No.	Original release date	Guest(s)
141	December 19, 1994	Richard Crenna

No.	Original release date	Guest(s)
142	December 20, 1994	Casey Kasem

No.	Original release date	Guest(s)
143	December 21, 1994	John Larroquette

No.	Original release date	Guest(s)
144	December 22, 1994	Patti Davis
