= Graziella Magherini =

Italian psychiatrist (1927–2023)

- Born: 23 August 1927; Florence, Italy
- Died: 10 December 2023 (aged 96); Florence, Italy
- Education: University of Florence
- Occupation: Psychiatrist
- Employer: Hospital of Santa Maria Nuova
- Known for: Stendhal syndrome
- Notable work: La sindrome di Stendhal
- Spouse: Ivan Nicoletti
- Children: 3

Graziella Magherini (Italian pronunciation: [ɡratˈtsjɛlla maɡeˈriːni]; 23 August 1927 – 10 December 2023) was an Italian psychiatrist.

== Career ==
Magherini was born in Florence on 23 August 1927. She studied medicine at the University of Florence. She specialized in psychiatry at age 28, and became a professor at age 33. She later worked as a psychiatrist at the Santa Maria Nuova Hospital in Florence.

== Stendhal syndrome ==
Graziella Magherini is best known for her 1989 book La sindrome di Stendhal (The Stendhal syndrome), which introduced this term to indicate a psychosomatic illness affecting individuals when exposed to art. After nearly 20 years of experience with patients at Santa Maria Nuova Hospital in Florence, Italy, Magherini began to note certain pathological abnormalities in a select group of her patients. Foreign visitors who had arrived in droves to indulge in the sumptuous beauty and art of the city were stricken by sudden and mysterious psychosomatic episodes that were induced by their identification with select and "personalized" art. "The Stendhal Syndrome occurs most frequently in Florence, because we have the greatest concentration of Renaissance art in the world."

Her study The Stendhal Syndrome (La Sindrome di Stendhal), published in 1989, is a description of her statistical methodology and, most importantly, a detailed description of some of her most interesting cases. Many of the case histories describe a foreigner who arrives in Florence, Italy and is overwhelmed by unrelenting depictions of Renaissance art and culture.

In the 'Inge Case,' Inge arrived from a Scandinavian country where she taught Italian to children. Her marriage was unsatisfactory and she was filled with the guilt of leaving her failing father, for whom she was a caregiver. Her Florence trip is the first she has taken in many years. Upon arrival she immediately felt 'out of sorts' and when she attended an Italian class for a second day, she noticed someone had taken her seat from the day before. Inge took this as a sign that no one wanted her in Florence. Suddenly, she was afflicted with an overwhelming sense of paranoia. Later, she visited one of Florence's famous cathedrals. She was drawn to one version of The Last Supper. Inge had palpitations and saw flashes of lights. In between flashes, she saw herself in the painting, as one of the women carrying a fruit basket to the table of Jesus. After a steady decline in her mental condition, she was admitted to the Santa Maria Nuova Hospital for observation.

From these cases, Magherini made some startling conclusions about the effects of artwork on the psyche, including that during the mirroring between art and subject, a sublime, aesthetic, and uncanny event occurs. Therein the art experience hooks a repressed trauma beneath the conscious sea of the subject rapidly pulling the trauma to the surface. The subject acts much like a distressed fish out of water. Magherini's job was to unhook the patient from this episode while under observation and gently place the patient back into society.

== Personal life and death ==
A widow with three children, Graziella Magherini died on 10 December 2023 in Florence, at the age of 96.

== See also ==
- Stendhal
- The Stendhal Syndrome, a psychological thriller film based on Magherini's book
- Culture shock
- Paris syndrome
- Jerusalem syndrome, a condition related to Stendhal syndrome.

== Published works ==
- Magherini, Graziella (1995). La sindrome di Stendhal (in Italian) (1995 ed.). Ponte alle Grazie. ISBN 88-7928-308-1. - Total pages: 219
