= I'm Spelling as Fast as I Can =

- The Simpsons episode
- Episode no.: Season 14; Episode 12
- Directed by: Nancy Kruse
- Written by: Kevin Curran
- Production code: EABF07
- Original air date: February 16, 2003

Guest appearance
- George Plimpton as himself

Episode features
- Couch gag: Homer (unseen, but implied to be him) draws the family on the couch with an Etch-a-Sketch (called a "Sketch-A-Etch" in the couch gag) and yells, "Whoo-hoo!" when he is done.
- Commentary: Al Jean; Kevin Curran; Ian Maxtone-Graham; Matt Selman; John Frink; Brian Kelley; Dan Castellaneta; Yeardley Smith; David Silverman

Episode chronology
← Previous "Barting Over"	Next → "A Star Is Born Again"
- The Simpsons season 14

"I'm Spelling as Fast as I Can" is the twelfth episode of the fourteenth season of the American animated television series The Simpsons. It originally aired on the Fox network in the United States on February 16, 2003, and was seen by around 22 million people during this broadcast. The episode is referred to as the 301st in the opening theme as it originally aired the same day as the episode "Barting Over", which was promoted as the 300th episode. It was written by Kevin Curran and directed by Nancy Kruse. This episode marked Kevin Curran's first sole writing credit, having previously served as a writer for the third segment of "Treehouse of Horror XIII", "The Island of Dr. Hibbert".

In this episode, Lisa qualifies for the Spellympics spelling bee where she is asked to lose to a cuter contestant in exchange for a college scholarship. Meanwhile, Homer becomes addicted to eating the Ribwich and follows its tour. Writer George Plimpton appeared as himself. The episode received positive reviews.

== Plot ==
While watching a horror movie show hosted by Boobarella (the show's take on Cassandra Peterson's Elvira character), a commercial plays for the Ribwich (the show's take on McDonald's McRib sandwich), a new Krusty Burger sandwich in which meat from an unknown animal is processed and molded into the shape of ribs. Homer excitedly samples the Ribwich, recently arrived at the Krusty Burger in Springfield, and becomes addicted.

The next day, Principal Skinner holds a spelling bee at the school. Lisa is excited when she wins the spelling bee, for which she is awarded a scale model of the planet Mars (a kickball with the word "Mars" written on it). She qualifies to the state spelling bee, and wins again, qualifying her for the Spellympics to be held in Calgary, and is further rewarded with a double wide locker at school, removing Ralph Wiggum's locker in the process.

Marge suggests they celebrate by going to a movie, but Homer says he has "important daddy business" — which turns out to be eating Ribwiches with Lenny and Carl at Krusty Burger, only to find that the limited-time-only Ribwiches are out of stock. However, a "Ribhead" (a fan of the Ribwich) tells Homer that it is being tested in other markets, so he decides to follow a group of Ribheads as they track the release of the Ribwich tour schedule.

At the Spellympics, hosted by George Plimpton, Lisa wins the semi-finals and secures a spot in the finals. The other two finalists are Sun Moon, a Korean girl, and Alex, a cute boy with big round glasses and a speech impediment who proves to be extremely popular. Plimpton takes Lisa aside and tells her that if she lets Alex win, she will be given a free scholarship to any Seven Sisters college and a free George Plimpton hot plate. Lisa is torn between wanting to win the Spellympics and free college, and asks Marge whether they can afford to send her to college. Marge is unsure, but promises to do whatever it takes to get Lisa into college, but Lisa is still uneasy since she is aware of Homer's low salary.

In San Francisco, Krusty informs all the Ribheads that the Ribwich will no longer be made, as the animal from which it was made is now extinct. He tosses the last one into the crowd. Homer catches it, fighting off the others. An Italian Ribhead offers Homer the lease to his car for the last Ribwich, pronouncing it as "lease-a", which makes Homer remember Lisa and the Spellympics. He agrees to the trade and takes off in the car, reaching the Spellympics finals just in time to see Lisa spell "intransigence" and encourage her. Lisa, happy to see her father, tells everyone that she was told to take a dive, but then unintentionally misspells her word. Lisa loses, and since she did not do it on purpose, Plimpton rescinds his offer.

On the way back to Springfield, Homer tries to cheer up Lisa when she admits that she let down everyone in town. However, she finds that in coming second she has become Springfield's most successful native ever (even outachieving the Springfield woman who once dated Charles Grodin). In her honor, the town carved Lisa's face on the side of a mountain.

== Production ==
A lengthy scene at the beginning of the show where Bart rushes to do everything he planned on doing during summer vacation was cut for time. The scene was later placed in the opening of the season 17 episode "The Monkey Suit", which aired three years later.

Writer George Plimpton guest starred as himself.

== Cultural references ==
The sequence where Homer becomes addicted to the Ribwich is a parody of the Darren Aronofsky film Requiem for a Dream (2000). Boobarella, who appears at the beginning of the episode, is a parody of Elvira, the seductive gothic character portrayed by Cassandra Peterson. While opening the school, Principal Skinner sings a parody of "School's Out" by Alice Cooper. The song played during the Spellympics and during the credits is "I Put a Spell on You" by Screamin' Jay Hawkins. The song played at the beginning of the Spellympics finals is "Get Ready for This" by 2 Unlimited. This song was also played in the episode "Homer and Ned's Hail Mary Pass" and "To Surveil with Love". The song played during the TV ad for the Ribwich is a parody of "Like a Rock" by Bob Seger, which is best known as Chevrolet trucks' theme music from 1991 to 2004. The title of the episode is a reference to the 1981 book I'm Dancing as Fast as I Can, by Barbara Gordon. Lisa jogging and running up the courthouse stairs is a take on the scene from Rocky II. A reference to AC/DC is made when Otto asks Lisa to spell AC/DC and she spells it A-C-D-C, but after she finishes, Otto says "you forgot the lightning bolt" (referring to the band's logo). Homer following the Ribwich around with the Ribheads is a play on Deadheads, fans of jam-band music (the Grateful Dead in particular) who follow the band when on tour in order to see multiple concerts. At one point, Krusty the Clown says "what a long strange product rollout it's been". This is a reference to the famous line "what a long strange trip it's been" in the Grateful Dead song "Truckin'". The Ribwich is a parody of McRib and its promotions.

== Release ==
The episode aired consecutively with the previous episode at 8:30 PM ET/PT.

== Reception ==
=== Viewing figures ===
The episode earned an 11.1 rating and was watched by 22.04 million viewers, which was 12th highest rated show that week.

=== Critical response ===
In 2011, Keith Plocek of LA Weekly named "I'm Spelling as Fast as I Can" the second best episode of the show with a food theme, commenting: "Spelling bee, schmelling bee. The star of this 2003 episode is the Ribwich, an obvious nod to McDonald's McRib."

Colin Jacobson of DVD Movie Guide thought the episode was "one of the year's better shows" and enjoyed Homer's Ribwich subplot.

On Four Finger Discount, Guy Davis and Brendan Dando thought it was "a pretty fun episode." They also liked Homer's subplot and how it merged back with the main plot.

In 2023, Tony Sokol of Den of Geek named the episode the 4th best episode of the series from the 2000s. He thought it was "one of the few episodes which works even though it has competing story lines."
