= Mr. Burns =

Fictional character from The Simpsons franchise

- The Simpsons character
- First appearance: "Simpsons Roasting on an Open Fire"; December 17, 1989
- Created by: Matt Groening; David Silverman; George Meyer
- Based on: Barry Diller & praying mantis (likeness); Lionel Barrymore & Ronald Reagan (voice)
- Designed by: Matt Groening
- Voiced by: Christopher Collins (Season 1 Episode 1); Harry Shearer (Season 1 Episode 3 – present)

In-universe information
- Full name: Charles Montgomery Plantagenet Schicklgruber Burns
- Gender: Male
- Occupation: Owner of the Springfield Nuclear Power Plant
- Family: Clifford Burns (father); Daphne Charles (mother); George Burns (brother); Colonel Wainwright Montgomery Burns (paternal grandfather; adoptive father)
- Spouse: Persephone Odair (ex-wife)
- Children: Larry Burns (son)
- Relatives: Evelyn Burns (paternal grandmother); Doreena Burns (paternal aunt); Jean-Claude Charles (maternal grandfather); Ophelia Charles (maternal grandmother)
- Nationality: American
- Age: 81–120

Charles Montgomery Plantagenet Schicklgruber "Monty" Burns, usually referred to as Mr. Burns or C. Montgomery Burns, is a character in the Fox animated television series The Simpsons, voiced by Harry Shearer. He is the evil, reviled, greedy, and wealthy owner of the Springfield Nuclear Power Plant and boss of Homer Simpson. He is assisted at almost all times by Waylon Smithers, his loyal and sycophantic aide, adviser, confidant, and secret admirer. He is around 156 years old, though sometimes it is implied he is much older. His place of birth is Pangea, revealed in the season 17 episode "The Seemingly Never-Ending Story".

Although originally conceived as a one-dimensional, recurring dastardly villain who might occasionally enter the Simpsons' lives and wreak some sort of havoc, Mr. Burns's popularity has led to his repeated inclusion in episodes. He is a stereotype of corporate America in his unquenchable desire to increase his own wealth and power, inability to remember his employees' names (including Homer's, despite frequent interactions—which has become a recurring joke) and lack of concern for their safety and well-being. Reflecting on his advanced age, Mr. Burns is given to expressing dated humor, making references to Jazz Age popular culture, and aspiring to apply obsolete technology to everyday life. Conan O'Brien has called Mr. Burns his favorite character to have written for, due to his arbitrarily old age and extreme wealth.

Mr. Burns's trademark expression is the word "Excellent...", muttered slowly in a low, sinister voice while steepling his fingertips. He occasionally orders Smithers to "release the hounds", so as to let his vicious guard dogs attack any intruders, enemies, or even invited guests. Mr. Burns is Springfield's richest and most powerful citizen (and also the richest person in Springfield's state; his current net worth has been given as $1.3 billion by Forbes, though it fluctuates wildly depending on the episode). He uses his power and wealth to do whatever he wants, usually without regard for consequences and without interference from the authorities. These qualities led Wizard magazine to rate him the 45th-greatest villain of all time. TV Guide named him #2 in their 2013 list of the 60 nastiest villains of all time. In 2016, Rolling Stone ranked him #8 of their "40 Greatest TV Villains of All Time".

== Role in The Simpsons ==
Mr. Burns spends much of his time in his office at the nuclear plant, monitoring his workers via closed-circuit cameras installed throughout the plant. In "Double, Double, Boy in Trouble", Mr. Burns revealed that he was the youngest of a wealthy family with eleven children, and all his siblings died of suspicious causes (mostly related to eating poisoned baked potatoes), leading to him receiving the entire family fortune, although another episode reveals that his surviving younger brother is comedian George Burns. At an early age, Mr. Burns left his family to live with a twisted and heartless billionaire who owned an "atom mill" in Shelbyville (implied to be his grandfather). He lived a life of privilege and would amuse himself by injuring immigrant laborers. Mr. Burns later attended Yale University, where he studied science and business, joined Skull and Bones, competed in the "etherweight" wrestling class, and graduated in the class of 1914. At his 25-year college reunion, he became romantically involved with the daughter of an old flame. She would later bear his child, Larry Burns, who was placed for adoption and would later enter Mr. Burns's life briefly. Mr. Burns has been engaged at least three times: to a woman named Gertrude who died of loneliness and rabies, to Marge Simpson's mother Jacqueline Bouvier, and to a meter maid named Gloria.

He later enlisted in the U.S. Army and served as a member of Springfield's Flying Hellfish squad under Master Sergeant Abraham Simpson and saw action in the Ardennes during the Battle of the Bulge. During the war, Mr. Burns, Abraham Simpson (father of Homer Simpson and grandfather to Lisa, Bart, and Maggie Simpson) and some of the soldiers found an expensive portrait in a manor in Germany. They locked it in a case and stated the last surviving member would get the painting (he and Abraham tied when the owner's descendant came back for the painting). Later on, he was shipped to the Pacific Theater and was a co-pilot along with Abe Simpson and his brother, Cyrus. Mr. Burns and Abe were shot down by a kamikaze and stuck on an island. Curiously, in the episode "American History X-cellent", Burns is arrested for art theft, and while he is getting his belongings checked at the prison, a prison guard finds a card that he mistakes as a Social Security card. Burns then yells out "That's just an SS card you dummkopf!" According to The Simpsons Wiki, after Germany had invaded Poland, Burns joined the SS but later defected, and then started service for the US Army. At the end of World War II, he was personally hired by President Harry S. Truman to transport a specially printed trillion-dollar bill to Europe as the United States' contribution to the reconstruction of Europe. As the United States' richest citizen, Mr. Burns was thought to be the most trustworthy. However, he absconded with the bill and kept it in his possession for many years until it was lost to Fidel Castro in "The Trouble with Trillions". In "Homer the Smithers", it is revealed that Mr. Burns's mother is still alive aged 122 years, although Mr. Burns dislikes speaking to her because she had an affair with President William Howard Taft and she refers to her son as an "improvident lackwit". Furthermore, because she is so old, the only things she can do (according to Smithers) are pick up the phone, dial, and yell.

Mr. Burns resides in a vast, ornate mansion on an immense estate called Burns Manor, on the corner of Mammon and Croesus Streets. It is protected by a high wall, an electrified fence, and a pack of vicious attack dogs known as "The Hounds". Mr. Burns routinely subjects Springfield and its residents to his abuse and a general dislike of him subsists throughout the town. Mr. Burns has blackmailed and bribed various officials in Springfield, including Mayor Quimby and the Nuclear Regulatory Commission. He employed his wealth to make an ultimately unsuccessful run for governor to prevent his plant from being closed for safety violations, only to be denied his chance to be Governor by Marge Simpson. He once blocked out the sun to force Springfield residents to increase their use of electricity produced by his nuclear plant and was subsequently shot by Maggie when he tried to steal candy from her.

In "Rosebud" from Season 5, his birthday is given as September 15. Mr. Burns's extreme old age is a frequent source of humor on the show. He is occasionally referred to as "Springfield's oldest resident"; in Season 2's "Simpson and Delilah", he told Homer that he is 81, although, in several later episodes, he is shown to be 104. When Smithers informs him that Mr. Burns's credit card PIN is his age, he types four digits in his answer. It is also mentioned that half of his age is 78, making him 156 years old. When Lisa Simpson is researching her ancestors from the American Civil War, she comes across a Colonel Burns in the journal, presumably one of Mr. Burns's earlier ancestors. However, when Lisa mentions him, Mr. Burns replies by saying that he has not heard his father's name in years. The episode reveals that Mr. Burns's father was a slaveowning Southern plantation owner who inspired the character Simon Legree from Harriet Beecher Stowe's novel Uncle Tom's Cabin, and that Homer and Grampa are descended from Colonel Burns's runaway slave Virgil who fled to British Canada with Mabel Simpson on the Underground Railroad. In other episodes, Mr. Burns's birthplace is apparently Pangea, his national anthem implies he was both from Austria-Hungary and unaware of its collapse in World War I, and he mentions the possibility of an update on the Siege of Khartoum, implying that he was aware of current events as early as 1884. In other episodes, he has instructed a postal clerk to send a telegram to the Prussian consulate in Siam via autogyro, and believes a nickel will buy "a steak and kidney pie, a cup of coffee, a slice of cheesecake and a newsreel, with enough change left over to ride the trolley from Battery Park to the Polo Grounds." Mr. Burns frequently answers the telephone with the archaic salutation "Ahoy-hoy", which was proposed by Alexander Graham Bell, but has long since been superseded by "Hello". In "The Old Man and the Lisa", Mr. Burns's investment portfolio is revealed to consist of long-defunct and obsolete companies such as "Confederated Slave Holdings", and he learns about the Wall Street Crash of 1929 and the Great Depression for the first time after checking a very old stock-ticker.

Mr. Burns's state of mind is the subject of frequent jokes on the show. At times, he appears to be completely removed from reality and modern conventions. He continually fails to recognize Homer Simpson or remember his name, even though many of the recent major events in Mr. Burns's life have involved Homer in some way. Mr. Burns is, for the most part, unaware of the townspeople's general dislike of him. He also displays mannerisms that are considered outdated, such as practicing phrenology, writing with a quill pen, and using an antique view camera to take photographs. He is also angered when Springfield Elementary children mock his dated car, saying it was "the first car to outrun a man!" Mr. Burns refers to many celebrities of the late 19th and early 20th centuries in the present tense, assuming they are still alive. In "Homer at the Bat", Mr. Burns instructs Smithers to recruit dead-ball-era players, such as Honus Wagner and Cap Anson for the plant's softball team, and has to be told that all of them died long ago. He also once rewarded Homer for being the first to arrive at work with a ticket to the 1939 World's Fair. However, despite his obvious senility and social ineptitude, Mr. Burns is an extraordinarily clever businessman, as he has lost his fortune several times, only to regain it a very brief time later. In the episode "The Old Man and the Lisa", Mr. Burns loses his fortune and regains it by opening a recycling plant, which allows him to regain his nuclear power plant. Additionally, in the episode "The Seemingly Never-Ending Story", Mr. Burns loses both his fortune and nuclear power plant to the Rich Texan after losing a scavenger hunt, but eventually gains both back after a series of events that includes him briefly working at Moe's Tavern.

Mr. Burns is physically weak and emaciated and is often shown to have little more strength than an infant. In "The Mansion Family", doctors at the Mayo Clinic discover that Mr. Burns has contracted every known human disease, as well as several that were discovered during his checkup, but that they have canceled each other out in a condition they call "Three Stooges syndrome;" although a doctor warns him that his physical health is extremely fragile and that "even a slight breeze" could upset the balance between his diseases, Mr. Burns misinterprets his condition to believe that he is invincible. In the intro of The Simpsons Movie, Mr. Burns is seen in his bathroom trying to brush his teeth. After Smithers applies the toothpaste onto his brush, he falls over. In "Rosebud" and "Who Shot Mr. Burns?", he needed a great deal of effort to wrench items from Maggie. He has difficulty performing such simple actions as giving a thumbs-up, and crushing an insect by stepping on it, or using a door-knocker. In one instance, when he is told to jump out of his burning mansion onto a life net, he drops at the speed of a feather, floats onto some power lines, and is electrified. He pitched the opening baseball at a game in "Dancin' Homer", but was only able to throw it a small distance, which drew mocking laughter from the crowd. When Mr. Burns joined Homer's bowling team in "Team Homer", he was barely able to roll the ball down the lane. In season five's "Burns' Heir", Smithers puts a sponge on Mr. Burns's head before leaving the bathroom, causing him to nearly drown in the tub from its weight. In "Lady Bouvier's Lover", however, he shows himself as a lively, excellent dancer.

Mr. Burns also had a teddy bear named "Bobo" that he loved as a child, revealed in the episode "Rosebud". The stuffed animal was lost and eventually, the stuffed bear became a toy for Maggie. In "American History X-cellent", Mr. Burns gets sent to jail because he is in possession of stolen paintings. In the same episode, it is implied that he was once in the SS. Another episode has him exclaim that he and Oskar Schindler had much in common, as they both made shells for the Nazis, "but mine worked, damn it!"

== Character ==
=== Creation ===
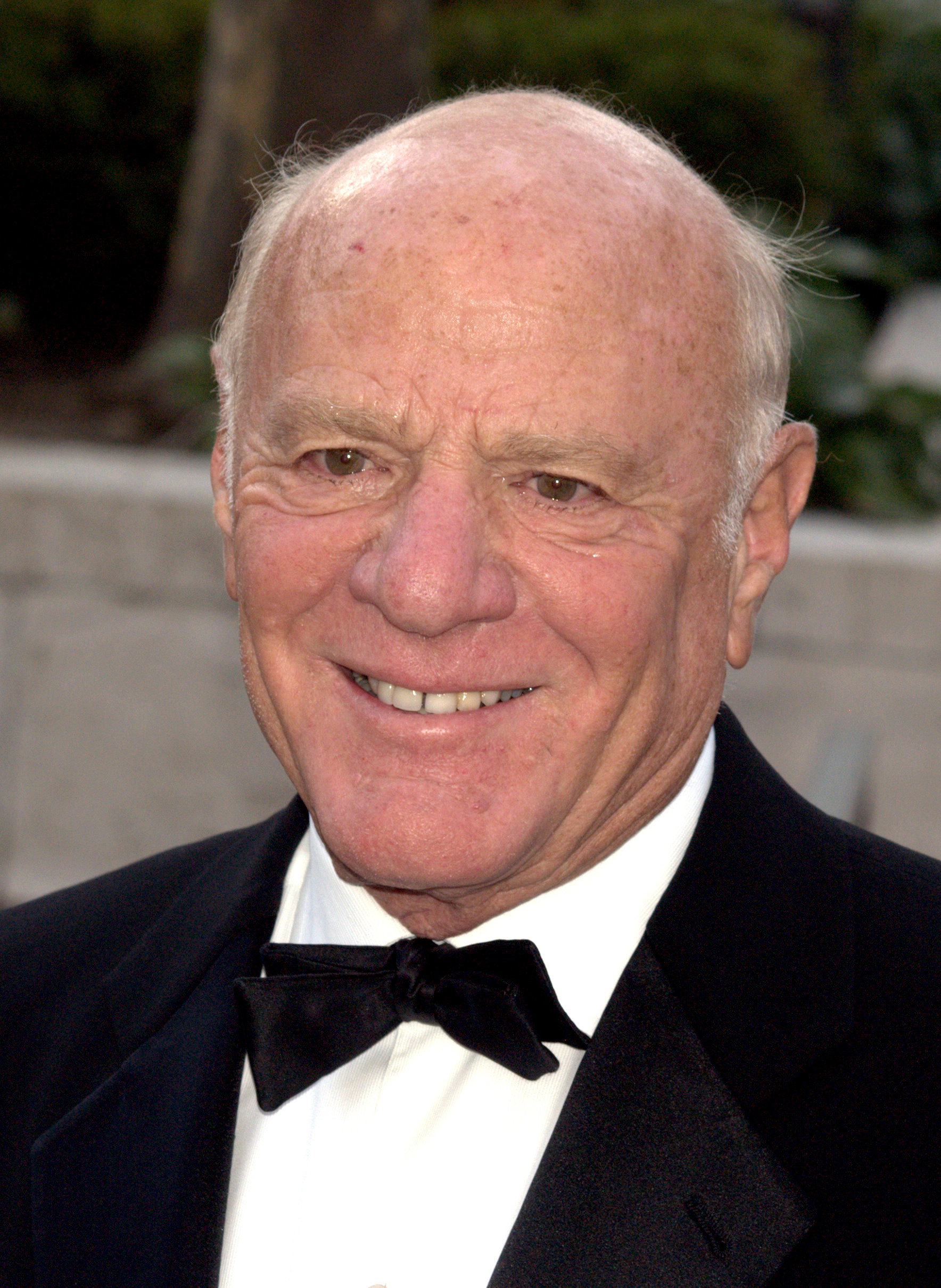
David Silverman based the appearance of Mr. Burns on Fox founder Barry Diller (pictured).

Mr. Burns's character, appearance, and mannerisms are based on several different people. The show's creator Matt Groening principally based Mr. Burns on his high school teacher Mr. Bailey. Drawing further inspiration from oil tycoon John D. Rockefeller and his grandson David Rockefeller, Groening made Mr. Burns the "embodiment of corporate greed". Animator David Silverman modeled Mr. Burns's appearance on Fox founder Barry Diller, and modeled his body on a praying mantis. In an interview with Graham Bensinger in 2025, Diller himself embraced the claim of him being a major inspiration for Mr. Burns, with it also being pointed out that Matt Groening had stated that he would not acknowledge this to be true because he still "feared" Diller. The idea of Mr. Burns reading employee names off cards in "There's No Disgrace Like Home" came from an article about Ronald Reagan that writer Al Jean had read. In some episodes, parallels have been drawn between Mr. Burns and moguls such as Howard Hughes and, more frequently, fictional character Charles Foster Kane from Citizen Kane. Writer George Meyer lifted Mr. Burns's "Excellent!" hand gesture from his former Saturday Night Live colleague Jim Downey. While perhaps not intentional, Mr. Burns's physical characteristics and mannerisms are cited as a modern example of the commedia dell'arte character Pantalone.

Al Jean revealed on a DVD commentary track that Sam Simon used his father's nickname, Monty, when he named Mr. Burns. Matt Groening claimed that Mr. Burns's middle name is from a Montgomery Ward department store in Portland, Oregon's Northwest Industrial district and his surname is from Burnside Street, a main thoroughfare in Portland. Mr. Burns's first name, Charles, is a reference to Charles Foster Kane. The names Plantagenet and Schicklgruber appear to refer to the House of Plantagenet and Alois Schicklgruber, the father of Adolf Hitler. In the script for "There's No Disgrace Like Home", Al Jean and Mike Reiss referred to him as "Mr. Meanie". In the second season, the writers started to enjoy writing about Smithers and Mr. Burns's relationship, and they often pitched episodes with them as the focus, but many never came to fruition.

=== Voice ===
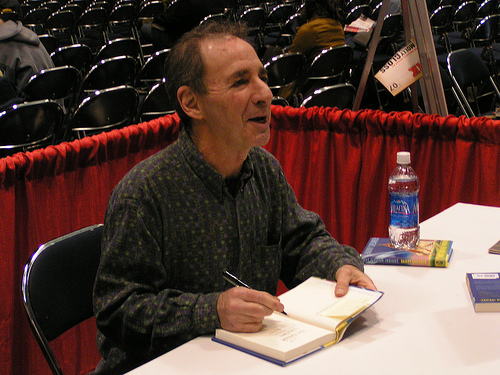
Harry Shearer (pictured) modeled his voice for Mr. Burns on Lionel Barrymore and Ronald Reagan.

Mr. Burns is voiced by Harry Shearer. Shearer modeled the voice on Lionel Barrymore and Ronald Reagan. Shearer is also the voice of Smithers and is able to perform dialogue between the two characters in one take. Shearer said he found Mr. Burns the most difficult character to voice because it is rough on his vocal cords and he often needs to drink tea and honey to soothe his voice. He said Mr. Burns was his favorite character: "I like Mr. Burns because he is pure evil. A lot of evil people make the mistake of diluting it. Never adulterate your evil." In 2014, Shearer won a Primetime Emmy Award for Outstanding Voice-Over Performance for his performance on "Four Regrettings and a Funeral" for voicing Mr. Burns.

== Reception ==
In 2006, Wizard rated Mr. Burns the 45th-greatest villain of all time. They also described Smithers and Mr. Burns as being "TV's most functional dysfunctional couple". In a 2003 article, EW also named "Last Exit to Springfield" the greatest episode of The Simpsons. Other episodes which feature Mr. Burns placed on the list, including "Rosebud", at number two, and the two-part episode "Who Shot Mr. Burns?", at number 25. Vanity Fair placed "Rosebud" first on their list of the top 25 Simpsons episodes.

Forbes estimates Mr. Burns's net worth at $1.3 billion, placing 12th on the 2008 Forbes Fictional 15 list. Mr. Burns has been on the list since 1989 and has previously placed fifth in 2005, second in 2006 and sixth in 2007 when he was estimated to be worth $16.8 billion. Mr. Burns's evil has made him a popular example of terrible television bosses. In 2006, outplacement firm Challenger, Gray & Christmas released a report saying that Mr. Burns was one of the eight worst bosses on television. The News & Observer named Mr. Burns the third worst boss, calling him "heartless, greedy and exceptionally ugly, Mr. Burns makes Ebenezer Scrooge seem downright lovely."

In the run-up to the New York City's 2009 mayoral election, several posters appeared throughout the city, showing Mr. Burns and accompanied by the words "No Third Terms, Vote for Burns"—a reference to Mayor Michael Bloomberg's run for a third term that year—in the style of Shepard Fairey's Obama poster. The city's Board of Elections announced that December that Mr. Burns had received 27 write-in votes out of 299 write-in votes cast. As the chief of "Springfield Republican Party" Mr. Burns endorsed Mitt Romney in the 2012 US presidential election. The IG Group, a financial corporation in the City of London, use a recording of Mr. Burns's catchphrase "Excellent" as an alert that an order has been completed.
