= American History X-cellent =

- The Simpsons episode
- Episode no.: Season 21; Episode 17
- Directed by: Bob Anderson
- Written by: Michael Price
- Production code: MABF08
- Original air date: April 11, 2010

Guest appearances
- Joe Mantegna as Fat Tony; Kevin Michael Richardson as Burns' Cellmate

Episode features
- Chalkboard gag: "Hot dogs are not bookmarks"
- Couch gag: The family sits on the couch, which is in the front lawn. The front of the house falls down around them, similar to a gag from Buster Keaton's Steamboat Bill, Jr.

Episode chronology
← Previous "The Greatest Story Ever D'ohed"	Next → "Chief of Hearts"
- The Simpsons season 21

"American History X-cellent" is the seventeenth episode of the twenty-first season of the American animated television series The Simpsons, and the 458th episode overall. It originally aired on the Fox network in the United States on April 11, 2010. In this episode, Mr. Burns is arrested for possessing stolen art and Smithers is chosen to run the nuclear plant—only to turn into a misanthropic slave driver when his subordinates begin taking advantage of his kindness.

The episode was written by Michael Price and directed by Bob Anderson. The episode features references to Stephen King's The Green Mile and The Shawshank Redemption.

"American History X-cellent" has received positive reviews from critics and received a 2.7 Nielsen Rating in the 18-49 demographic.

== Plot ==
Mr. Burns throws a Fourth of July party for himself, forcing his employees to wait on him and perform a musical number without pay. Afterwards, Homer, Lenny and Carl break into Burns' wine cellar as payback and become drunk. Burns discovers this and calls the police, who notice that Burns' mansion contains stolen artwork. He is arrested and paraded through the streets inside a bamboo cage where he is jeered by the townspeople on his way to prison. He leaves a reluctant Smithers in charge.

Burns is placed in a cell with another white-collar criminal but demands to be moved when he discovers his cellmate was educated at Dartmouth College and the University of Virginia. Burns is claimed by another prisoner. Smithers assumes management at the nuclear plant and attempts to show the plant employees that he is nothing like Burns by being kind and accommodating. But when he joins Homer, Lenny and Carl for beer at Moe's, he overhears them making fun of him. Smithers realizes why Burns scorns humanity, and his behavior quickly deteriorates into that of a tyrant.

Burns' new cellmate is a born-again Christian who convinces him to find religion. He "sucks" the evil out of Burns who joins the prison choir and a Beatles tribute band and reads the Holy Bible in the prison laundry. Tired of Smithers, Homer, Lenny and Carl decide to break Burns out of prison by disguising themselves as prison guards to sneak in and remove Burns from his cell. Burns does not want to leave because he believes he has found his spiritual home. While the cellmate tries to stop them from escaping, they convince Burns to leave with them. Burns uses his money to leave the prison system but hopes his friend will gain another disciple. Burns' former cellmate finds a new disciple in Fat Tony.

Meanwhile, Bart and Lisa are forced to play with one another when Marge goes shopping. Lisa suggests playing with her ant farm, but she and Bart argue over how to care for her ants. When they fight over her ant farm, it breaks, and Santa's Little Helper eats all but one of the ants. Lisa names the survivor Annie and prevents Bart from caring for her. When Lisa and Bart realize that Annie is dying, they decide to release her into the wild, but Santa's Little Helper eats Annie immediately.

== Production ==
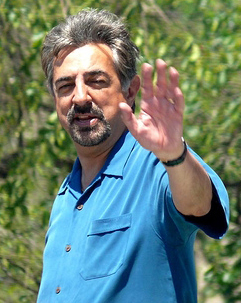
Joe Mantegna guest starred in the episode as recurring character, Fat Tony.

The episode was written by Michael Price and directed by Bob Anderson, his second credit of the season after "Rednecks and Broomsticks". The episode also features the second appearance of Kevin Michael Richardson who first appeared in "Homer the Whopper" and Joe Mantegna as Fat Tony. Sideshow Bob makes a non-speaking cameo appearance in this episode in where he is put in a dryer.

== Cultural references ==
The Mr. Burns plot is based on Stephen King's novel The Green Mile, with the inmate being based on the character John Coffey. The episode also parodies elements from The Shawshank Redemption, by the same author, including the prison and the warden. Another reference to Shawshank Redemption is that the felon tears a Rita Hayworth poster off the wall, uncovering a cross. The title is based on the film American History X. The picture in Mr. Burns' office is based on Saturn Devouring His Son by Francisco Goya. Burns' induction to the prison is accompanied by "Prison Bound Blues" performed by John Lee Hooker.

== Reception ==
In its original American broadcast, "American History X-cellent" was viewed by 5.649 million viewers and a 2.7 rating and 8 share in the 18-49 demographic tying with the previous week's episode. The episode ranked 20 in the 18-49 weekly Nielsen Rating.

The episode received mixed reviews.

TV Fanatic gave the episode a 3.5/5 saying "Overall, the main story line was great. Unfortunately, Bart and Lisa were given a weak side story, where really the only funny moments were Lisa telling Bart they need to keep the lines of communication open for organ transplants and Bart licking Lisa to try and earn her forgiveness."

Jason Hughes of TV Squad gave the episode a positive review saying "A pleasant enough episode of 'The Simpsons' made better by the presence of C. Montgomery Burns. Even Smithers upped his game, bringing the funny this week".

Emily VanDerWerff of The A.V. Club gave the episode a B, saying "I like Mr. Burns as a character enough, and I like the way the show tells stories about him enough to give this a mildly approving grade." VanDerWerff added that Lisa and Bart's story was "just plain stupid".

Robert Canning of IGN gave the episode a 6.9/10 and saying it was "Passable" and "Though the potential was there, ‘American History X-cellent’ failed to deliver a would-be classic Mr. Burns episode. His time in prison was too mundane. Evil Mr. Burns is always more fun than a kindhearted Mr. Burns, and new and original ideas are always better than tired Shawshank references. Maybe we'll get an old school Mr. Burns episode next season." Readers, however, gave the episode 8.5/10.
