= Kevin Curran (writer) =

American television comedy writer

- Born: Kevin Patrick Curran; February 27, 1957; Hartford, Connecticut, U.S.
- Died: October 25, 2016 (aged 59); West Hollywood, California, U.S.
- Education: Harvard College
- Occupation: Screenwriter
- Partner: Helen Fielding (1999–2009)
- Children: Dash Curran; Romy Curran
- Writing career
- Genre: Comedy

Kevin Patrick Curran (February 27, 1957 – October 25, 2016) was an American television comedy writer. He wrote for Late Night with David Letterman, Married... with Children, and The Simpsons. He was also the voice of Buck the Dog on Married... with Children (except for several episodes in which Buck was voiced by Cheech Marin).

In the sixth-season episode "Psychic Avengers", Curran appeared briefly onscreen during the end sequence where, thanks to Madam Inga's curse, the Bundy family is turned into chimpanzees and Buck is turned into a human, in which Curran is credited as "Buck the Man" above the usual final credited character of "Buck the Dog". In addition to writing episodes and voicing Buck, Curran served as a story editor and supervising producer on Married... with Children.

== Biography ==
Curran attended Harvard College, where he was an editor of the Harvard Lampoon. He subsequently wrote for the National Lampoon and was the editor of the letters and cartoon sections. He also wrote for Late Night with David Letterman for which he won three Emmys. He wrote Letterman's first "Top Ten List": "The Top 10 Things That Almost Rhyme With Peas".

In 1989, he joined Married... with Children, and, in 2000, he joined The Simpsons where he was a co-executive producer. At The Simpsons, Curran won three additional Emmys and was nominated in 2010 for a Humanitas Prize for his episode "The Greatest Story Ever D'ohed".

Curran was co-creator and executive producer of the shows The Good Life and Hardball. He was an executive producer on the series Unhappily Ever After with Ron Leavitt from 1997 to 1999. He won a WGA Award for The Earth Day Special.

Curran was in a relationship with the author Helen Fielding from 1999 to 2006; the couple had two children. Curran died of complications from cancer on October 25, 2016, aged 59.

== The Simpsons episodes ==
Curran wrote the following episodes of The Simpsons:

- "Treehouse of Horror XIII" (the "Island of Dr. Hibbert" segment)
- "I'm Spelling as Fast as I Can"
- "My Big Fat Geek Wedding"
- "Don't Fear the Roofer"
- "We're on the Road to D'ohwhere"
- "The Wife Aquatic"
- "Sex, Pies and Idiot Scrapes"
- "Rednecks and Broomsticks"
- "The Greatest Story Ever D'ohed"
- "How Munched is That Birdie in the Window?"
- "The Winter of His Content"
- "Homer Is Where the Art Isn't"

== Married... with Children episodes ==
Curran wrote the following episodes of Married... with Children:

- "Who'll Stop the Rain"
- "You Gotta Know When to Fold 'Em (part 2)"
- "Raingirl"
- "Sue Casa, His Casa"
- "Do Ya Think I'm Sexy"
- "Weenie Tot Lovers & Other Strangers"
- "She's Having My Baby (part 2)"
- "If Al Had a Hammer"
- "The Mystery of Skull Island"
- "England Show III: We're Spending as Fast as We Can"
- "Tis Time to Smell the Roses"
