= The Good Life (1994 TV series) =

1994 American sitcom

- Also known as: The Bowmans
- Genre: Sitcom
- Created by: Jeff Martin; Kevin Curran; Suzanne Martin
- Written by: Warren Bell; Wendy Braff; Kevin Curran; Mark Driscoll; Holly Hester; Frank Lombardi; Jeff Martin; Suzanne Martin; Dana Reston; Leslie Rieder; David Silverman; Stephen Sustarsic
- Directed by: Gerry Cohen
- Starring: John Caponera; Drew Carey; Eve Gordon; Jake Patellis; Shay Astar; Justin Berfield; Monty Hoffman; Ralph Ahn
- Composer: Jonathan Wolff
- Country of origin: United States
- Original language: English
- No. of seasons: 1
- No. of episodes: 13

Production
- Producers: David Silverman; George Sunga
- Running time: 30 minutes
- Production companies: Interbang, Inc.; Touchstone Television

Original release
- Network: NBC
- Release: January 3 – April 12, 1994

The Good Life is an American sitcom television series created by Jeff Martin, Kevin Curran and Suzanne Martin, which aired on NBC from January 3 to April 12, 1994. It starred John Caponera and Drew Carey. Other members of the cast included Eve Gordon, Jake Patellis, Shay Astar, Justin Berfield and Monty Hoffman. It focuses on the personal and working life of John Bowman (Caponera) and his family.

== Premise ==
The show revolved around John Bowman, and featured both his home life and the lock distribution warehouse where he serves as a middle manager. It was set in Chicago.

== Production ==
Caponera originally created the character of John Bowman for his stand-up routine. He based John on the man he would have become if he had "married young and never finished college." When executives from Disney saw Caponera perform the character during one of his shows, they offered him the chance to star in his own sitcom. The Good Life was created by Jeff Martin, Kevin Curran and Suzanne Martin.

The show premiered on January 3, before moving to its regular Tuesday timeslot the following day. The fifth episode, broadcast on January 30, 1994, aired following NBC's coverage of Super Bowl XXVIII.

=== Cancellation ===
Thirteen episodes were produced and aired, before the sitcom was cancelled on May 13, 1994. Caponera heard about the cancellation from the press and was unhappy with NBC for dropping the show, stating "People seemed to love it, but the powers that be didn't care because the ratings weren't high enough." He felt that NBC did not do enough to help get the show started when it debuted in January, suggesting that a comedy lead in and not putting them up against Full House on ABC would have helped growth. He also pointed out that The Good Life was taken off air for coverage of the Olympics and then placed in a different timeslot, which impacted the show's ratings. Caponera told Bunnie Nichols of The News-Press that the show's producer Disney Studios was shopping the sitcom around and that Fox were interested.

== Cast ==
- John Caponera as John Bowman, a middle manager at Honest Abe Security Products
- Eve Gordon as Maureen Bowman, a school teacher and John's wife
- Jake Patellis as Paul Bowman, John and Maureen's teenage son
- Shay Astar as Melissa Bowman, John and Maureen's teenage daughter
- Justin Berfield as Bob Bowman, John and Maureen's six year old son
- Drew Carey as Drew Clark, John's best friend and co-worker
- Monty Hoffman as Tommy Barlett, the union shop steward

== Episodes ==
No.	Title	Directed by	Written by	Original release date	Prod. code	Viewers (millions)	Rating/rank (households)
1	"Paul Dates a Buddhist"	Gerry Cohen	Warren Bell	January 3, 1994	R204	20.0	12.4 / #38
2	"Maureen's Play"	Gerry Cohen	Mark Driscoll	January 4, 1994	R206	12.0	8.3 / #73
3	"Pilot"	John Rich	Jeff Martin, Kevin Curran, Suzanne Martin	January 11, 1994	R201	9.9	6.9 / #84
4	"John Hurts His Leg or Tales from the Crip"	Gerry Cohen	David Silverman and Stephen Sustarsic	January 18, 1994	R205	10.2	6.8 / #84
5	"The Statue"	Gerry Cohen	Frank Lombardi and Dana Reston	January 30, 1994	R209	22.8	14.2 / #21
6	"Calendar Girl"	Gerry Cohen	Mark Driscoll	February 1, 1994	R213	10.3	7.5 / #83
7	"She Shoots, She Scores"	Gerry Cohen	Kevin Curran	February 1, 1994	R211	10.2	7.1 / #84
8	"John Takes Out Melissa"	Gerry Cohen	Leslie Rieder	March 15, 1994	R208	8.3	7.0 / #78
9	"John Fights the System"	Gerry Cohen	David Silverman and Stephen Sustarsic	March 15, 1994	R212	9.9	5.9 / #86
10	"Bob's Field Trip"	Gerry Cohen	Wendy Braff	March 22, 1994	R202	8.2	6.0 / #78
11	"Melissa the Thief"	Gerry Cohen	Suzanne Martin	March 29, 1994	R203	8.4	6.2 / #81
12	"The Mother-in-Law"	Gerry Cohen	Holly Hester	April 5, 1994	R207	7.1	5.4 / #88
13	"John's New Assistant"	Gerry Cohen	Suzanne Martin	April 12, 1994	R210	7.8	5.9 / #85

== Reception ==
John J. O'Connor of The New York Times gave the show a positive review, writing "Another sitcom. Another show with a goofy dad, a wry mom and three troublesome but wonderful kids. Television marches on. Groan. But then, against all odds, the tired formula works." He thought John's co-workers were "brought to a wonderful level of lunacy by Drew Carey and Monty Hoffman" and he praised the younger actors, calling their characters "appealing." He believed that the cast were "having a genuinely good time" and that came across in their performances, adding "that's a good sign. Mr. Caponera is onto something."
