= Paris syndrome =

Form of tourist disillusionment

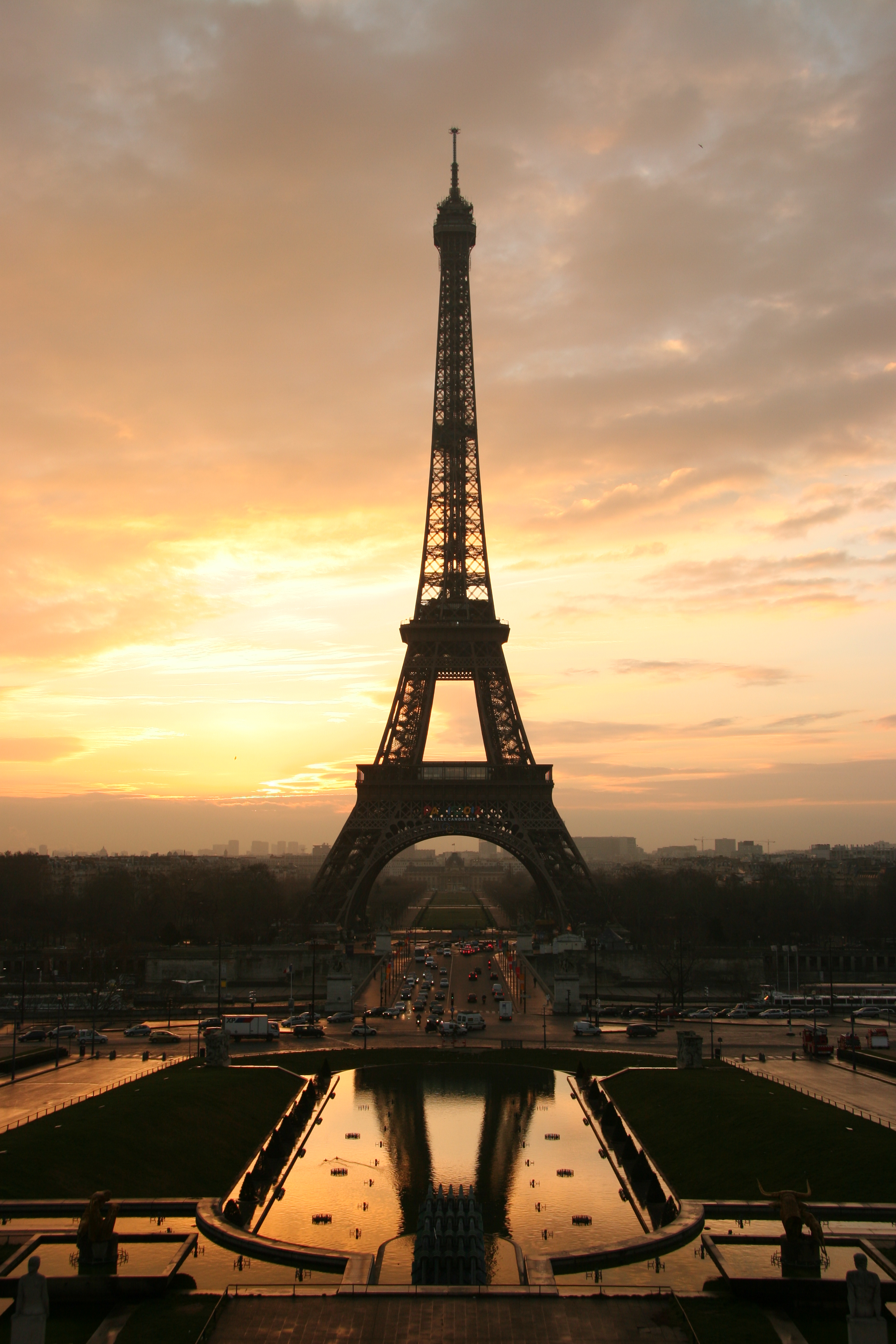
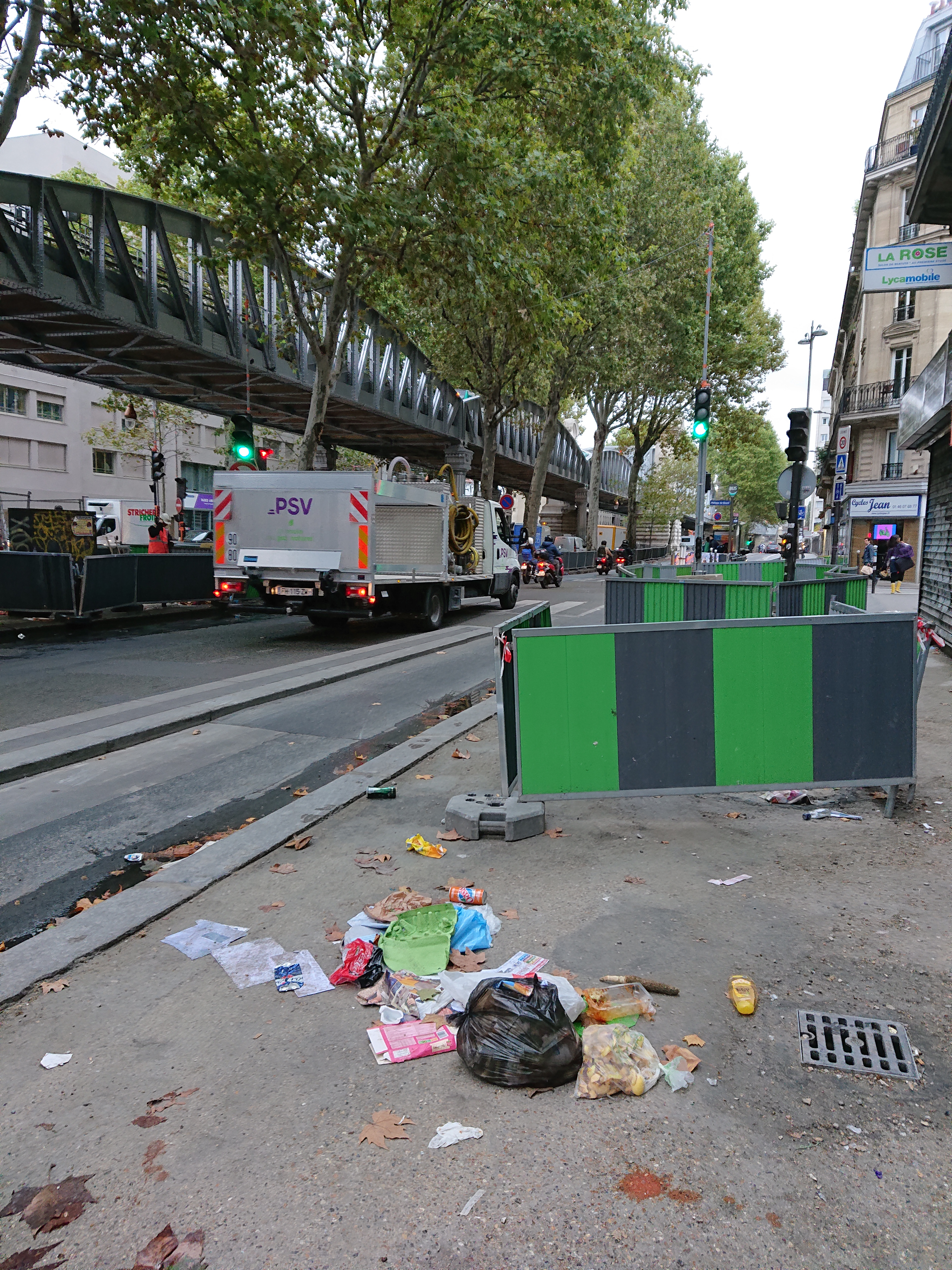
Many have attributed the syndrome to the contrast between the cultural idealization of Paris and the visible reality of modern urban centers.

Paris syndrome (in Japanese: パリ症候群, Pari shōkōgun) is a sense of extreme disappointment exhibited by many individuals when visiting Paris, who feel that the city does not live up to their expectations. The condition is commonly viewed as a severe form of culture shock. The cluster of psychiatric symptoms has been particularly noted among Japanese tourists, perhaps due to the way in which Paris has been idealized in Japanese culture.

The syndrome is characterized by symptoms such as acute delusional states, hallucinations, feelings of persecution (perceptions of being a victim of prejudice, aggression, hostility from others), derealization, depersonalization, anxiety, as well as psychosomatic manifestations such as dizziness, tachycardia, sweating most notably, but also others, such as vomiting.

== Causes ==
A 2004 paper by Viala et al. in French medical journal Nervure suggests a number of factors that may be behind the syndrome among Japanese tourists:

Language barrier
Few Japanese tourists speak French and vice versa. The differences between these two languages pose serious obstacles to communication, increasing the individual's confusion and sense of anxiety and isolation.
Interpersonal relationships
Japanese sociability is based on being part of a group. A traveler who is apart from their community may feel particularly detached and isolated.
Cultural differences
The French enjoy a more informal temperament, in stark contrast to the more rigid Japanese culture, and Parisians' expressive variations in mood may be misinterpreted.
Idealization of Paris
The syndrome is also due to the gap observed between the idealized vision of Paris nurtured at home, and the actual reality of Paris. The city is often portrayed as an idyllic place of beauty, love and luxury goods. The reality is often different, and more similar to modern Japan than tourists might expect.
Exhaustion
The effort involved in organizing an intercontinental trip, which is often not for pleasure, but for business, combined with the consequences of jet lag increases the psychological destabilization of the Japanese traveler.

== History ==
As early as 1656, English physician-philosopher Sir Thomas Browne speculated upon possible psychopathology when touring cultural cities. In his A Letter to a Friend (pub. post 1690) he observes:

He that is weak-legg'd must not be in Love with Rome, nor an infirm Head with Venice or Paris.

Jean-Jacques Rousseau described in his Confessions a great disillusionment in his first visit to Paris in 1732.

How greatly did my first sight of Paris belie the idea I had formed of it! [...] I had imagined a city of a most imposing appearance, as beautiful as it was large, where nothing was to be seen but splendid streets and palaces of marble or gold. As I entered through the Faubourg Saint-Marceau, I saw nothing but dirty, stinking little streets, ugly black houses, a general air of squalor and poverty, beggars, carters, menders of clothes, sellers of herb-drinks and old hats. All this so affected me at the outset that all the real magnificence I have since seen in Paris has not been sufficient to efface my first impression, and I have always retained a secret aversion against living in the capital.

Hiroaki Ota, a Japanese psychiatrist working at the Sainte-Anne Hospital Center in France, coined the term in the 1980s and published a book of the same name in 1991. Katada Tamami of Nissei Hospital wrote of a Japanese patient with manic-depression, who experienced Paris syndrome in 1998.

Later work by Dr. Youcef Mahmoudia, a psychiatrist with the hospital Hôtel-Dieu de Paris, indicates that Paris syndrome is "psychopathology related to travel, rather than a syndrome of the traveler." He theorized that the excitement resulting from visiting Paris causes the heart to accelerate, causing giddiness and shortness of breath, which results in hallucinations in the manner similar to Stendhal syndrome, although spurring from opposite causes, described by Italian psychiatrist Graziella Magherini in her book La sindrome di Stendhal.

Although the BBC reported in 2006 that the Japanese embassy in Paris had a "24-hour hotline for those suffering from severe culture shock", the Japanese embassy stated that such a hotline does not exist. In 2006, Miyuki Kusama, of the Japanese embassy in Paris, told The Guardian that "there are around 20 cases a year of the syndrome and it has been happening for several years", and that the embassy had repatriated at least four Japanese citizens that year. In 2011, the Japanese embassy stated that, despite media reports to the contrary, it did not repatriate Japanese nationals with Paris syndrome.

== Susceptibility ==
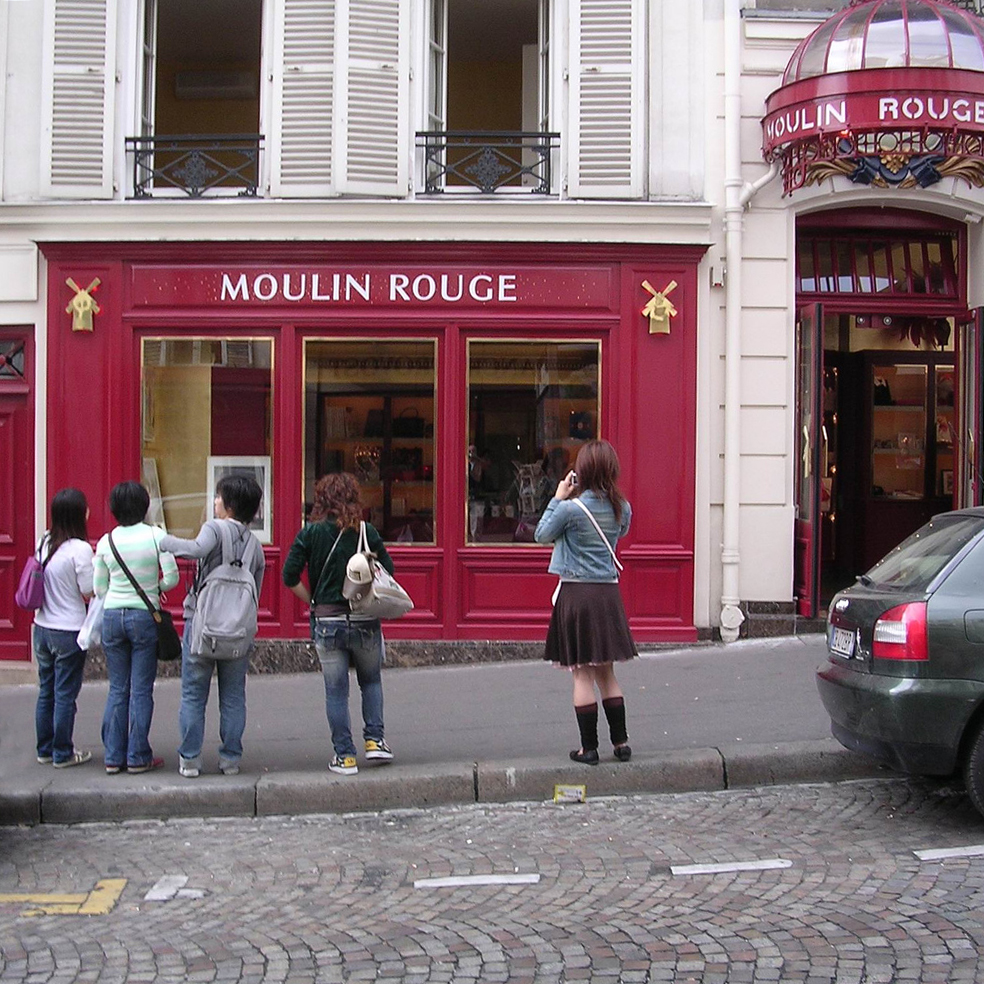
Japanese tourists in Paris

Of the estimated 1.1 million annual Japanese tourists in Paris, the number of reported cases is small. In 2016, a journal identified two types of the condition: Those who have previous history of psychiatric problems, and those without morbid history who exhibit delayed-expression post traumatic stress disorder. In a 2011 interview with Slate.fr, Mahmoudia stated that of the fifty pathological travelers hospitalized each year, three to five are Japanese.

The French newspaper Libération wrote an article on the syndrome in 2004. In the article, Mario Renoux, the president of the Franco-Japanese Medical Association, states that media and touristic advertising are primarily responsible for creating this syndrome. Renoux indicates that while magazines often depict Paris as a place where most people on the street look like models and most women dress in high fashion brands, in reality neither Van Gogh nor models are on the street corners of Paris.

In this view, the disorder is caused by positive representations of the city in popular culture, which leads to immense disappointment, as the reality of experiencing Paris is very different from expectations. Tourists are confronted with an overcrowded and littered city, especially if compared to a Japanese metropolis, and a less than welcoming attitude by French hospitality workers, like shopkeepers, restaurant and hotel personnel, without considering the higher safety risks to which tourists used to safer cities are suddenly exposed.

In 2014, Bloomberg Pursuits reported that the syndrome affected a few of the million annual Chinese tourists in Paris. Jean-Francois Zhou, president of the association of Chinese travel agencies in France (Association Chinoise des Agences de Voyages en France), said "Chinese people romanticize France, they know about French literature and French love stories... But some of them end up in tears, swearing they'll never come back." The article cited a 2012 survey from the Paris Tourism Office, in which safety and cleanliness received low scores, and noted that the Paris Police Prefecture website was made available in Chinese, in addition to English and French. However, Michel Lejoyeux, head of psychiatry at Bichat–Claude Bernard Hospital in Paris, said in an interview that "Traveler's syndrome is an old story", and pointed to Stendhal syndrome which, conversely, is a set of symptoms arising from an overwhelmingly positive touristic experience.

== See also ==
- Japanese community of Paris
- Jerusalem syndrome – Group of mental phenomena
- Psychosis – Abnormal condition of the mind
- Stendhal syndrome – Psychosomatic condition of being overwhelmed by art or beauty
