= Chief of Hearts =

- The Simpsons episode
- Episode no.: Season 21; Episode 18
- Directed by: Chris Clements
- Written by: Carolyn Omine & William Wright
- Production code: MABF09
- Original air date: April 18, 2010

Guest appearances
- Jane Kaczmarek as Judge Constance Harm; Maurice LaMarche; Joe Mantegna as Fat Tony

Episode features
- Chalkboard gag: "This counts as gym and art class"
- Couch gag: The same four-course dinner gag as in "Wedding for Disaster", but Comic Book Guy calls the meal "terrible" after tossing down his napkin.

Episode chronology
| ← Previous "American History X-cellent" | Next → "The Squirt and the Whale" |
- The Simpsons season 21

"Chief of Hearts" is the eighteenth episode of the twenty-first season of the American animated television series The Simpsons. It originally aired on the Fox network in the United States on April 18, 2010. In this episode, Homer and Chief Wiggum become friends after Homer shares a sandwich with Wiggum during his community service sentence. Meanwhile, Bart becomes addicted to a Japanese kids' game called Battle Ball, but Marge and Principal Skinner believe that Bart is dealing drugs. It is also the first episode in which Lisa does not deliver any dialogue.

The episode was written by Carolyn Omine and William Wright and directed by Chris Clements, features guest star Jane Kaczmarek as Judge Constance Harm, Maurice LaMarche and Joe Mantegna as Fat Tony and has references to the television shows Starsky and Hutch, Three's Company, and Bakugan Battle Brawlers.

"Chief of Hearts" received mixed to positive reviews from critics and came first in its timeslot.

== Plot ==
When Homer attempts to bring a candy apple into a bank, he is mistaken for a gun-toting bank robber and sentenced by Judge Constance Harm to 100 hours of community service. While completing his community service, Homer offers Chief Wiggum a sandwich. Wiggum is touched by the offer, and the two become instant friends. As the two spend time together, Wiggum confesses to Homer that he has very few friends because citizens fear him as a cop and other cops belittle him. Their moment is interrupted when the chief must rush to a robbery, where Wiggum is shot by a thug in Fat Tony's mob. Homer keeps a bedside vigil in the hospital until Wiggum awakes, but soon tires of Wiggum's neediness and goes to Moe's for a break. When Wiggum finds him there, he declares Homer to be a bad friend and demands that Eddie and Lou arrest him, but when they refuse the unlawful task, Wiggum yells at them and storms out.

Later, Homer finds Wiggum on the same hillside where they first hung out together. When they spot Fat Tony and his mob counterfeiting Lacoste shirts, Homer and Wiggum are captured and thrown in the trunk of Tony's car to be taken to an execution site. The situation seems hopeless, but Homer expresses faith in Wiggum to find a way out. Wiggum rearranges the CDs to play "At Seventeen" by Janis Ian instead of a dramatic song, angering Tony. When Legs and Louie open the trunk, Wiggum uses items in it to knock them out and the two make their escape. They reconcile and proceed to hassle Ned Flanders with the police helicopter, tricking him into believing that God is convincing him to do embarrassing tasks.

Meanwhile, Bart is introduced to a Japanese card game called "Battle Ball" at Dylan's birthday party. While it is never resolved whether Dylan is male or female, Bart becomes hooked on this game. His jargon and secretive behavior lead Principal Skinner to suspect Bart of dealing drugs. Marge cannot believe that Bart would become involved with drugs, but she becomes suspicious and searches his room. When he catches her rifling through his things, he shows her his Battle Ball gear and she is satisfied that his interests are legal. Bart is horrified, though, that Marge thinks the game is cute and decides to flush it down the toilet, causing it to overflow.

== Production ==
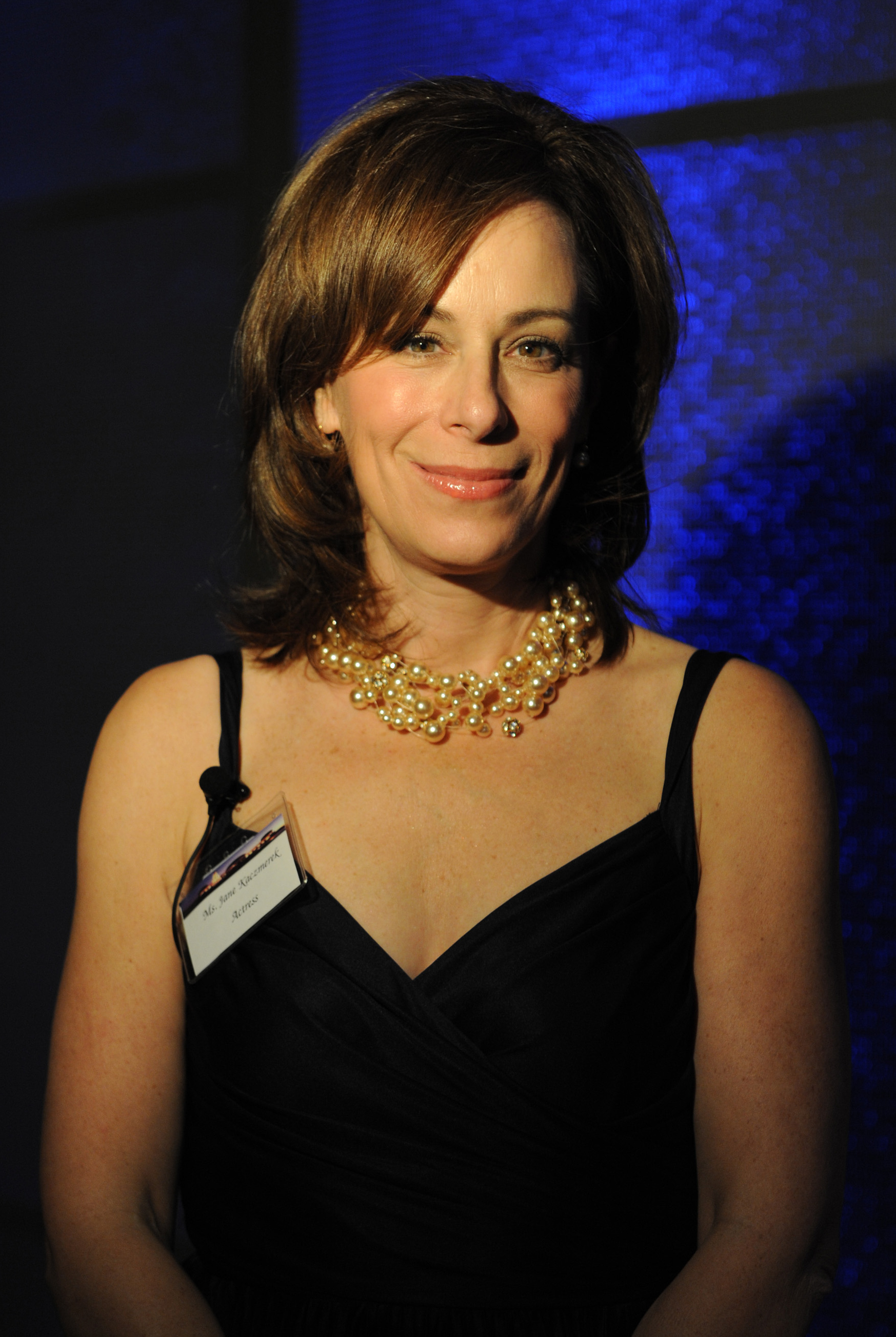
Jane Kaczmarek guest starred as Judge Constance Harm.

The episode was written by Carolyn Omine and William Wright and directed by Chris Clements. The episode features guest appearances by Jane Kaczmarek as Judge Constance Harm, Maurice LaMarche and Joe Mantegna as Fat Tony. Sideshow Bob makes a cameo appearance at the end.

== Cultural references ==
During the episode an episode of Starsky and Hutch can be seen. Also Edward G. Robinson is seen. Bart's subplot parallels the South Park episode, "Chinpokomon" and the sitcom Three's Company. The game Bart and his friends play is a parody of Bakugan (one of the kids says it makes Digimon look like Pokémon). Digimon, like The Simpsons, also aired on Fox and the first season episode, And So It Begins, aired on August 14, 1999, just over a month before the season 11 premiere episode, Beyond Blunderdome, had aired. When Wiggum tells Krusty to go sort out the bums we see one of the bums is John Swartzwelder. Dr. Hibbert mentions in the hospital that Wiggum's X-ray had his left lung full of Shamrock Shake, he mentions that McDonald's did not sell them this year (2010). The song "At Seventeen" performed by Janis Ian is played.

== Reception ==
This episode was watched in 5.93 million households and an 8-49 Nielsen Rating of 2.7 and a share of 8 coming first in its timeslot. The episode ranked 24th in the weekly 18-49 rating dropping four positions from last week's "American History X-cellent."

The episode received mixed reviews. Robert Canning of IGN gave the episode an 8/10 and stated "There was a lot to enjoy in 'Chief of Hearts'. Pairing Homer with Wiggum had not been something overdone by the series, so having the two at the center of the episode had a certain freshness to it. The story maybe not so much, but the pairing worked." He also mentioned that "Bart's 'Battle Balls' storyline was also fun, even though there was absolutely nothing to it."

Emily VanDerWerff of The A.V. Club gave the episode a B−, saying, "A lot of latter-day Simpsons episodes do this to goose the climax, since the ending of a Simpsons episode, even a good one, is usually its weakest point. This was no exception, so that keeps the episode from the heights of some of the others this season, but it's nice to see the show try new things every once in a while".

TV Fanatic gave the episode 2.5/5, stating "It's shocking that a Simpsons episode that focused on a friendship between Homer and Clancy would be so mediocre. If the main story wasn't disappointing enough, the side story with Bart becoming addicted to Battle Balls is barely worthy of mention."

Jason Hughes of TV Squad said "Homer Simpson and Clancy Wiggum becoming BFFs should have been comedy gold; instead, this episode of 'The Simpsons' was a colossal bore. It seems like everything hilarious you can do with the Springfield police - high-speed car chases, putting squirrels down your pants for the purpose of gambling - has already been done. They never even go out for donuts!"
