= The Greatest Story Ever D'ohed =

- The Simpsons episode
- Episode no.: Season 21; Episode 16
- Directed by: Mike Frank Polcino
- Written by: Kevin Curran
- Production code: MABF10
- Original air date: March 28, 2010

Guest appearances
- Sacha Baron Cohen as Jakob; Yael Naim as Dorit

Episode features
- Couch gag: Repeat of the couch gag from "In the Name of the Grandfather".

Episode chronology
← Previous "Stealing First Base"	Next → "American History X-cellent"
- The Simpsons season 21

"The Greatest Story Ever D'ohed" is the sixteenth episode of the twenty-first season of the American animated television series The Simpsons, and the 457th episode overall. It originally aired on the Fox network in the United States on March 28, 2010 (Palm Sunday and the eve of Passover). In this episode, the Simpsons vacation in Jerusalem with Ned Flanders, but Homer does not appreciate the city's religious importance—until he gets lost in the desert, and in a severe state of dehydration, believes himself to be the Messiah.

The episode was written by Kevin Curran and directed by Mike Frank Polcino and guest stars Sacha Baron Cohen as the Israeli tour guide Jakob and Yael Naim as his niece Dorit.

“The Greatest Story Ever D'ohed" received a 2.7/8 Nielsen Rating in the 18-49 demographic and mixed to positive reviews from critics.

== Plot ==
Ned Flanders is frustrated when Homer disrupts his Bible study group, and Reverend Lovejoy suggests that Ned invite the Simpson family to join the group on their tour of Jerusalem. Marge accepts over Homer’s objections. Upon arrival in Jerusalem, they are joined by Krusty the Clown, who is making a Jewish pilgrimage. Passing the Western Wall, they meet a talkative, pushy tour guide named Jakob and his niece Dorit, who doubles as his security guard and pummels Bart into submission using her knowledge of Krav Maga.

At first, Homer and the other tourists show more interest in the hotel's buffet than they do in seeing the city, much to Ned's dismay. When they arrive at King David's Tomb, Ned implores Homer to show some respect. Homer, however, continues to goof off and Ned becomes increasingly impatient with him.

Their next stop is the Church of the Holy Sepulchre, where Ned prays that Homer will find some meaning in the tour but soon finds him taking a nap on Jesus’ empty tomb. Ned loses his temper at Homer and then smashes his camera, causing security personnel to remove him from church and permanently ban him from returning. Ned betrays Homer and storms away, exasperated with Homer's crass behavior and lack of reverence (stating that Homer is "not worth saving"). Homer loses sight of Ned and believes that he is lost in the desert; in reality, Ned calms himself by getting a cup of tea and going to see an Israeli movie. Meanwhile Homer rides into the desert on a camel in search of Ned, but becomes lost in a sandstorm and begins to succumb to dehydration. He drinks some of the briny water from the Dead Sea, worsening his condition, and hallucinates that several of the characters from VeggieTales are naming him as a new Messiah.

Marge and a security guard rescue Homer, and Dr. Hibbert diagnoses him with Jerusalem syndrome, whose sufferers possess religiously-themed obsessive ideas. Homer escapes from the hotel and ends up at the Dome of the Rock (after overhearing Lisa speculate that that's where he would end up). Marge, the Simpson children, and Dr. Hibbert chase after him, only to hear him preach that the similarities of different religions outweigh their differences, and that all should search for a common ground for a joint new religion, the so-called "Chrismujews". Ned witnesses Homer's speech and is profoundly moved, but the effect is lost on the crowd as nearly all of the other tour group members have developed Jerusalem syndrome as well. On the flight back to Springfield, Ned and Homer reconcile.

== Production ==
In September 2009, Entertainment Weekly report that Sacha Baron Cohen would play an Israeli tour guide who encounters the Simpsons and tries to get Marge to give him a good rating. Executive producer Al Jean described the character as "angry but funny." Musician Yael Naim also guest starred in the episode as Dorit. She received an offer to be on the show, and she stated that she had fun because she became a "part of history."

== Reception ==
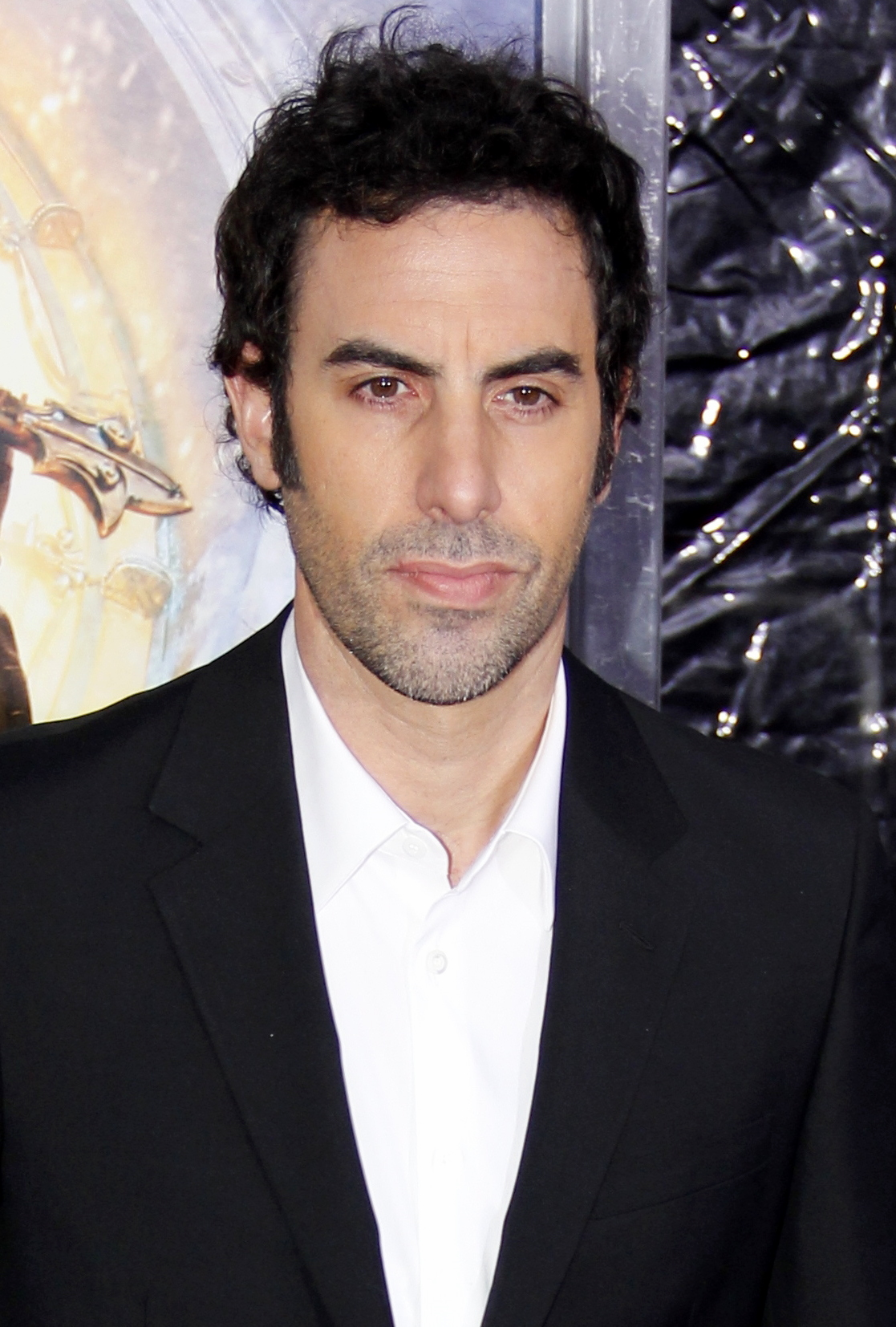
A reviewer from IGN found Sacha Baron Cohen's voiceover of the tour guide difficult to understand.

In its original airing, "The Greatest Story Ever D'ohed" was viewed by 5.698 million viewers and got a Nielsen Rating of 2.7, with an 8 share of the audience. It came second in its timeslot and second in the "Animation Domination" lineup.

The episode received mixed to positive reviews.

Robert Canning of IGN gave the episode a 7.3, calling it "decent" and adding, "I was underwhelmed with Sacha Baron Cohen's voice work as the group's tour guide. He was like a sped up Borat and was actually a bit difficult to understand at times. The few jokes that did get through were only okay." Canning also stated that "it's difficult to keep your expectations in check when you hear about an upcoming guest star, and that likely affected my perception of this episode. But that it is what it is. Perhaps subsequent viewings will find me enjoying this more, but for now, 'Greatest Story Ever D'ohed' was just this side of good."

Emily VanDerWerff of The A.V. Club gave the episode a B+ and said "there were jokes here that went on way too long, like that whole krav maga thing. But, for the most part, this was a funny vacation episode, and the show hasn't done one of those in a while."

Jason Hughes of TV Squad gave the episode a negative review saying "I don't expect 'The Simpsons' to have that sharp edge of wit it used to in its earlier, more subversive days, but I do expect it to be able to create situations for humor from time to time; even if it's gentle humor."

TV Fanatic gave the episode a 3/5 saying "It manages to combine jokes, while still showing positive messages such as Homer showing genuine care after Flanders, his supposed enemy, takes off into the dessert [sic]. Or even Homer's positive message of re-uniting all faiths."

Writer Kevin Curran was nominated for a Humanitas Prize for his script.

== Cultural references ==
The episode was used on a report on Jerusalem syndrome by CNN.

While searching for Ned in the desert, the overture from the 1962 film Lawrence of Arabia plays.
