= The Stendhal Syndrome =

1996 Italian giallo film by Dario Argento

- Italian theatrical release poster
- Directed by: Dario Argento
- Screenplay by: Dario Argento
- Story by: Dario Argento; Franco Ferrini
- Based on: La sindrome di Stendhal by Graziella Magherini
- Produced by: Dario Argento; Giuseppe Colombo
- Starring: Asia Argento; Thomas Kretschmann; Marco Leonardi; Luigi Diberti; Julien Lambroschini; John Quentin; Paolo Bonacelli
- Cinematography: Giuseppe Rotunno
- Edited by: Angelo Nicolini
- Music by: Ennio Morricone
- Production companies: Cine 2000; Medusa Produzione
- Distributed by: Medusa Distribuzione
- Release date: January 26, 1996
- Running time: 120 minutes
- Country: Italy
- Language: Italian
- Budget: $3.8 million (estimated)
- Box office: ₤5.443 billion (Italy)

The Stendhal Syndrome (Ital. La sindrome di Stendhal) is a 1996 Italian psychological horror film written and directed by Dario Argento and starring his daughter Asia Argento, with Thomas Kretschmann and Marco Leonardi. It was a critical and commercial success in Italy, grossing ₤5,443,000,000 Italian lira (US $3,809,977).

The title refers to a psychological condition in which a subject enters a fugue state induced by the presence of art. Argento said he experienced Stendhal syndrome as a child. While touring Athens with his parents young Dario was climbing the steps of the Parthenon when he was overcome by a trance that caused him to become lost from his parents for hours. The experience was so strong that Argento never forgot it; he immediately thought of it when he came across Graziella Magherini's book about the syndrome, which would become the basis of the film.

== Plot ==
Anna Manni, a police detective from Rome travels to Florence in pursuit a serial rapist and murderer, Alfredo Grossi. While visiting a museum, Anna is overcome by Stendhal syndrome, a condition which causes the sufferer to become overwhelmed when viewing great works of art. When Alfredo learns of Anna's disorder, he uses it to disable her before he kidnaps her and subjects her to a brutal and sadistic sexual attack. Although she manages to escape, Anna is left deeply traumatized. Alfredo continues to track her movements and is able to capture her again. This time, however, Anna turns the tables on her abductor, breaking free of his grasp, badly wounding him in the process, and knocking him into a river.

While the police, believing Alfredo to be dead, search the river for his body, Anna meets and soon falls in love with Marie, a young French art student. Anna also takes sessions with a psychologist in an effort to come to terms with her own deep-seated emotional trauma. That trauma is intensified when Anna begins to receive phone calls from the supposedly-dead Alfredo. When Marie is found murdered, Anna's psychologist, concerned about her mental state, visits her at home. While he is there, a colleague of Anna's, Marco, calls to notify her that Alfredo's body has in fact been found. This leads to the psychologist realizing the truth, and he confronts Anna with the reality that she herself is Marie's murderer. Marco arrives at Anna's apartment, only to find that she has killed her psychologist as well. As he attempts to take Anna's gun from her, she confesses that Alfredo is now inside her, ordering her to do terrible things, whereupon she murders Marco. The police arrive on the scene and ultimately arrest her after she wanders the streets.

== Cast ==
- Asia Argento as Detective Anna Manni
- Thomas Kretschmann as Alfredo Grossi
- Marco Leonardi as Marco Longhi
- Luigi Diberti as Inspector Manetti
- Paolo Bonacelli as Dr. Cavanna
- Julien Lambroschini as Marie Beyle
- John Quentin as Mr. Manni
- Franco Diogene as Victim's Husband
- Lucia Stara as The Shop Assistant
- Sonia Topazio as Victim In Florence
- Lorenzo Crespi as Giulio
- Vera Gemma as The Policewoman
- John Pedeferri as Hydraulic Engineer
- Veronica Lazar as Mrs. Beyle
- Mario Diano as The Coroner
- Cinzia Monreale as Mrs. Grossi
- Antonio Marziantonio as Night Watchman
- Eleonora Vizzini as Anna Manni, child

== Production ==
Upon release, the alternative title was The Stendhal System.

Bridget Fonda was originally set to star in the role of Anna, but dropped out before the start of production, and Jennifer Jason Leigh was considered as a possible replacement before Dario Argento eventually cast his own daughter, Asia, in the role. Thomas Kretschmann was cast as Alfredo Grossi because he had previously worked with Asia on the film La Reine Margot (1994) and she recommended him to her father.

The opening scene was shot in Florence at Italy's famed Uffizi Gallery. Dario Argento is the only director ever granted permission to shoot there.

The work that Anna literally steps into is a painting by Rembrandt, depicting 17th century policemen and titled The Night Watch. The painting that causes Anna to faint in the museum is Landscape with the Fall of Icarus, by Bruegel.

The footage of Anna underwater after she faints in the gallery was shot in the sea. The huge grouper fish that Anna kisses was a remote model that was being pulled through the water by cables attached to a small float on the ocean's surface. Mere moments after wrapping the underwater shoot, the fish stopped working.

This would be the last fiction feature film for acclaimed director of photography Giuseppe Rotunno. The following year he shot a documentary on Marcello Mastroianni before retiring.

Graffiti artists were brought in to cover the walls of Alfredo's underground lair with graffiti. In one night the group created over one hundred square feet of graffiti-covered walls at the location.

This is the second of (to date) six films in which Argento has directed his daughter, Asia, the five others being: Trauma, The Phantom of the Opera, The Mother of Tears, Dracula 3D, and Dark Glasses She also had roles in Demons 2 and The Church, both of which her father produced.

Argento planned on making a sequel to The Stendhal Syndrome which would follow detective Anna Manni on another case. However, Asia was unavailable so the character's name was changed (to Anna Mari) and Stefania Rocca was cast. The resulting film is 2004's The Card Player.

== Release ==
=== Versions ===
The Italian release was around two minutes longer than the English export version, including an additional scene where Anna calls the husband of one of Alfredo's victims and another where she meets Marie's mother, played by Veronica Lazar (whose name is included in the credits of all versions, even those in which she does not appear). These scenes were eventually made available to international audiences on home video but remain in Italian, as dubs in other languages were never created.

=== Critical reception ===
The film carries a 70% 'Fresh' rating from Rotten Tomatoes based on 10 reviews indicating positive reviews, and was nominated for a Saturn Award for Best Home Video Release.

Response from critics was mixed, with AllMovie's Jason Buchanan calling the film "a sadistic and disturbing psychological exploration", but one that is "ultimately a victim of its own excess and the director's tendency to overcomplicate a fairly simple storyline." Buchanan praised the film's "stunningly visual opening sequence" and Ennio Morricone's "hauntingly hypnotic score" but criticized how "the seemingly meandering plot grinds to a halt just as it should truly shine."

Variety's David Rooney gave the film a mixed review, praising the film's "exhilarating" opening sequence and Giuseppe Rotunno's "cool and elegant" cinematography, but lamented that "[a]s with much of the director’s work, large sections of plot are pure hokum, and the gradual slackening of both pace and suspense in a sluggish second half only underlines the increasing silliness."

Maitland McDonagh gave a mostly positive review, writing that "this isn't a return to the baroque heights of Opera and Tenebrae. But it's a must-see for Argento completists, driven by a brave and disturbing performance by the director's daughter, Asia", though she criticized the film for taking "a serious wrong turn around the time Anna buys a blond, femme-fatale wig."

=== Home video ===
In the US, The Stendhal Syndrome was first distributed by B movie company Troma Entertainment. A new special edition DVD of the film was released by Blue Underground on 30 August 2007. Blue Underground went on to release a Blu-ray in 2008 containing, for the first time in an English-friendly release, the uncut original version, including the additional Italian-only scenes (still in Italian, with English subtitles). The company re-released the film in 2017 as a three-disc limited edition.

For its initial release in the United Kingdom, eleven cuts, primarily to the rape scenes, violence and some dialogue, totalling 2 minutes 47 seconds, were made by the distributor before submission to the BBFC for a video certificate. However, the uncut version was initially released. Since this had not been submitted to the British Board of Film Classification, this version was withdrawn and re-released. The 2005 UK DVD release, by Arrow Pictures, had all previous cuts waived and represents the full-length English version, although like all English releases it omits the two scenes then exclusive to the Italian version. A later release by Arrow Video in 2010 contained the missing short scenes.
