= Stendhal syndrome =

Psychosomatic condition of being overwhelmed by art or beauty

Stendhal syndrome, Stendhal's syndrome or Florence syndrome is a psychosomatic condition involving rapid heartbeat, confusion, hallucinations, and even fainting, allegedly occurring when individuals become exposed to objects, artworks, or phenomena of great beauty.

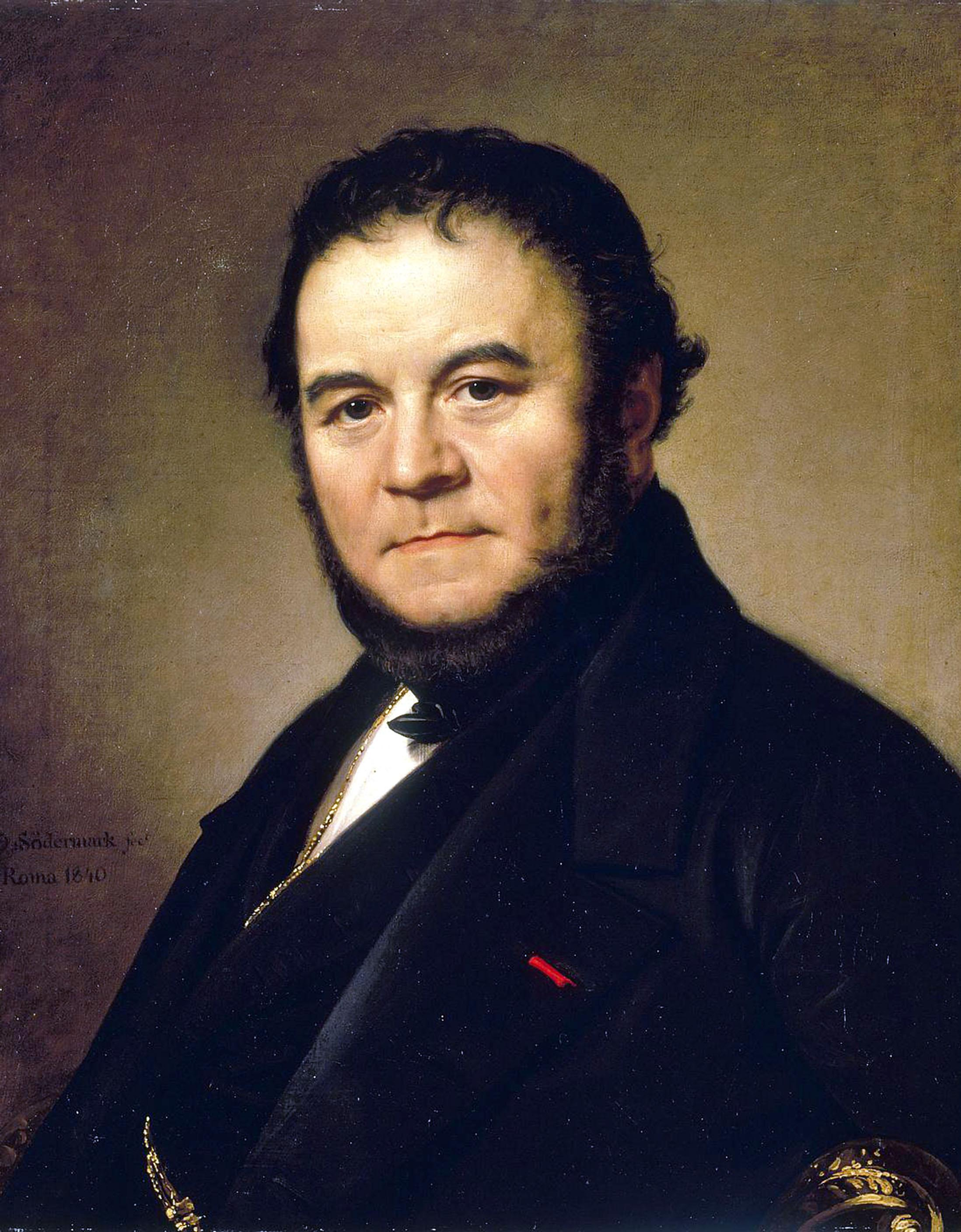
Stendhal syndrome was named after Marie-Henri Beyle (1783–1842), better known by his pen name, Stendhal.

The affliction is named after the 19th-century French author Stendhal (pseudonym of Marie-Henri Beyle), who described his experience with the phenomenon during his 1817 visit to Florence, Italy, in his book Naples and Florence: A Journey from Milan to Reggio. When he visited the Basilica of Santa Croce, where Niccolò Machiavelli, Michelangelo and Galileo Galilei are buried, he was overcome with profound emotion. Stendhal wrote:

I was in a sort of ecstasy, from the idea of being in Florence, close to the great men whose tombs I had seen. Absorbed in the contemplation of sublime beauty . . . I reached the point where one encounters celestial sensations . . . Everything spoke so vividly to my soul. Ah, if I could only forget. I had palpitations of the heart, what in Berlin they call 'nerves'. Life was drained from me. I walked with the fear of falling.

Although psychologists have long debated whether Stendhal syndrome exists, the apparent effects on some individuals are severe enough to warrant medical attention. The staff at Florence's Santa Maria Nuova hospital are accustomed to tourists suffering from dizzy spells or disorientation after viewing the statue of David, the artworks of the Uffizi Gallery, and other historic treasures of Florentine art.

While there are numerous such accounts dating from the early 19th century, the phenomenon was first referred to as "Stendhal syndrome" in 1989, when it was described by Italian psychiatrist Graziella Magherini, who observed more than a hundred similar cases among tourists. There is no evidence to define Stendhal syndrome as a specific psychiatric disorder, and it is not listed as a recognised condition in the Diagnostic and Statistical Manual of Mental Disorders; however, there is scientific evidence that the same cerebral areas involved in emotional responses are stimulated during exposure to art.

A more recent account of the Stendhal syndrome was in 2018, when a visitor to the Uffizi Gallery in Florence suffered a heart attack while admiring Sandro Botticelli's The Birth of Venus.

== See also ==
- Double Rainbow – 2010 viral video by Paul Vasquez
- Jerusalem syndrome – Group of mental phenomena
- Lisztomania – 1840s fan frenzy for composer Franz Liszt
- Beatlemania – Fan frenzy for the British band the Beatles
- Museum fatigue – State of fatigue caused by museum exhibits
- Paris syndrome – Form of tourist disillusionment
- Reflex syncope – Brief loss of consciousness due to a neurologically induced drop in blood pressure
- The Stendhal Syndrome – A 1996 psychological thriller film on the subject
