= Jerusalem syndrome =

Group of mental phenomena

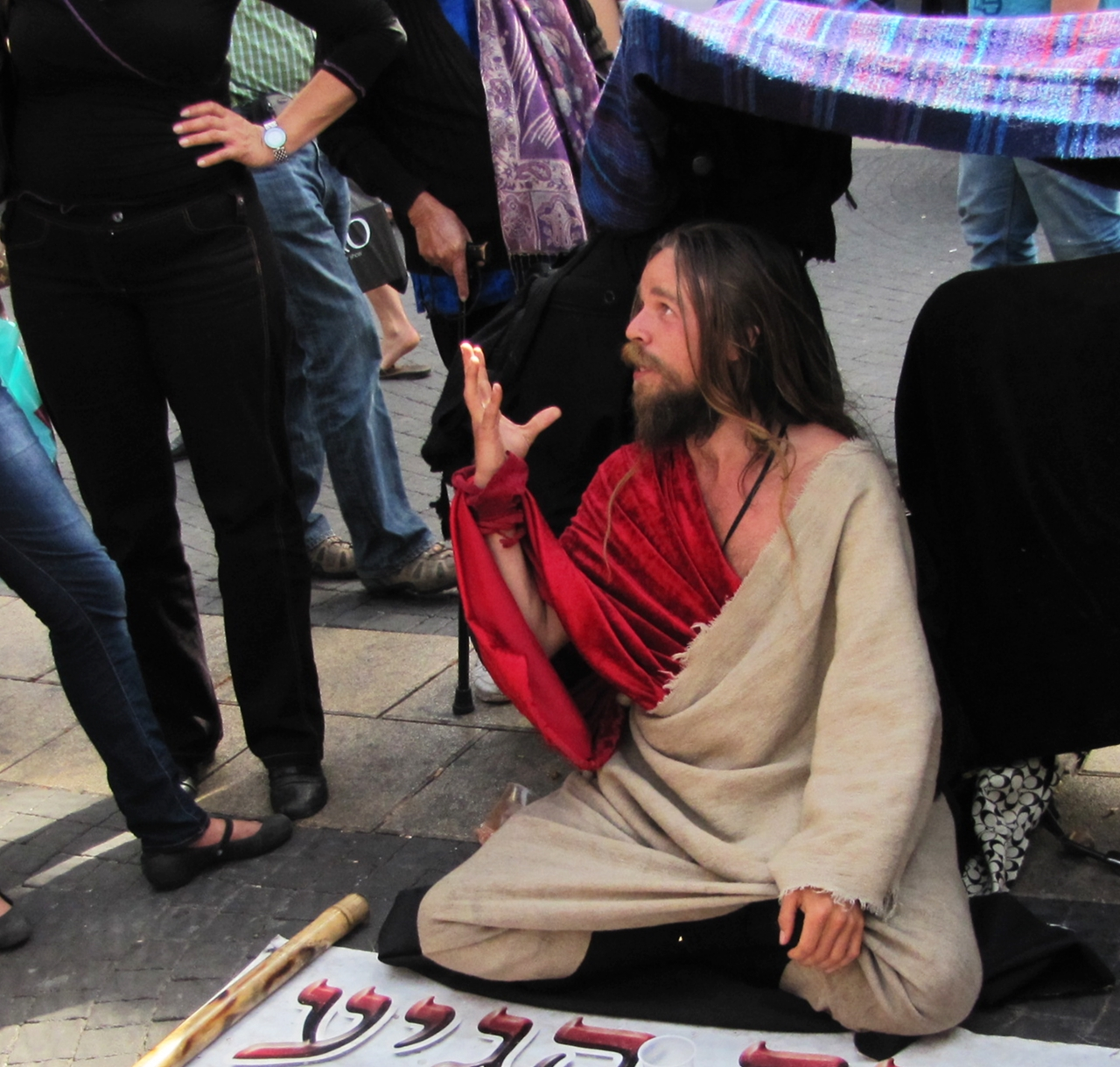
Man claiming to be the messiah in Tel Aviv, 2010

Jerusalem syndrome is a group of mental phenomena involving the presence of religiously themed ideas or experiences that are triggered by a visit to the city of Jerusalem. It is not endemic to one single religion or denomination but has affected Jews, Christians, and Muslims of many different backgrounds. It is not listed as a recognised condition in the Diagnostic and Statistical Manual of Mental Disorders or the International Classification of Diseases.

The best known, although not the most prevalent, manifestation of Jerusalem syndrome (classified as Type III) is the phenomenon whereby a person who seems previously balanced and devoid of any signs of psychopathology becomes psychotic after arriving in Jerusalem. The psychosis is characterised by an intense religious theme and typically resolves to full recovery after a few weeks or after being removed from the area. The religious focus of Jerusalem syndrome distinguishes it from the related phenomena of Stendhal syndrome in Florence or Paris syndrome in Paris.

In a 2000 article in the British Journal of Psychiatry, Bar-El et al. claim to have identified and described a specific syndrome which emerges in tourists with no previous abnormal psychiatric history. However, this claim has been disputed by M. Kalian and E. Witztum. Kalian and Witztum stressed that nearly all of the tourists who demonstrated the described behaviours were mentally ill prior to their arrival in Jerusalem. They further noted that, of the small proportion of tourists alleged to have exhibited spontaneous psychosis after arrival in Jerusalem, Bar-El et al. had presented no evidence that the tourists had been well prior to their arrival in the city.

== History ==
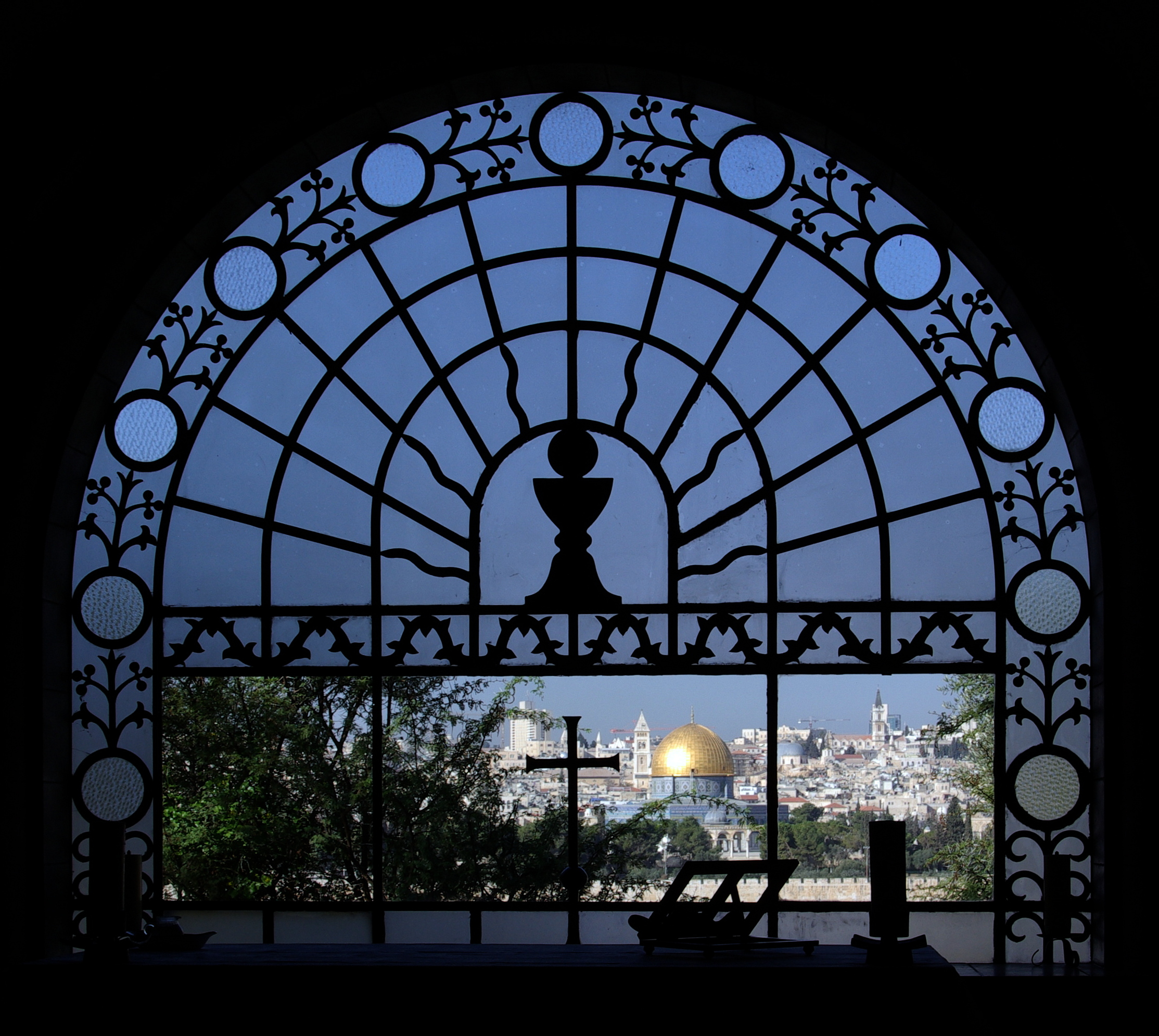
View of Jerusalem

Jerusalem syndrome had previously been regarded as a form of hysteria, referred to as fièvre Jérusalemienne (French, literally 'Jerusalemian fever'). It was first clinically described in the 1930s by Jerusalem psychiatrist Heinz Hermann, one of the founders of modern psychiatric research in Israel. Whether or not these behaviors specifically arise from visiting Jerusalem is debated, as similar behaviors have been noted at other places of religious and historical importance, such as Mecca and Rome (see Stendhal syndrome). It is known that cases of the syndrome had already been observed during the Middle Ages, since it was described in the itinerary of Felix Fabri and the biography of Margery Kempe. Other cases were described in the vast literature of visitors to Jerusalem during the 19th century.

Bar-El et al. suggested that at the approach of the year 2000, large numbers of otherwise normal visitors might be affected by a combination of their presence in Jerusalem and the religious significance of the millennium, causing a massive increase in the numbers of Jerusalem syndrome admissions to hospital. Despite a slight increase in tourist hospitalisations with the rise in total tourism to Jerusalem during the year 2000, the feared epidemic of Jerusalem syndrome never materialised.

== Types ==
The classic Jerusalem syndrome, where a visit to Jerusalem seems to trigger an intense religious psychosis that resolves quickly after or on departure, has been a subject of debate in the medical literature. Most of the discussion has centered on whether this definition of the Jerusalem syndrome is a distinct form of psychosis, or simply a re-expression of a previously existing psychotic illness that was not picked up by the medical authorities in Israel.

In response to this, Bar-El et al. classified the syndrome into three major types to reflect the different types of interactions between a visit to Jerusalem and unusual or psychosis-related thought processes. However, Kalian and Witztum have objected, saying that Bar-El et al. presented no evidence to justify the detailed typology and prognosis presented and that the types in fact seem to be unrelated rather than different aspects of a syndrome.

=== Type I ===
Jerusalem syndrome imposed on a previous psychotic illness. This refers to individuals already diagnosed as having a psychotic illness before their visit to Jerusalem. They have typically gone to the city because of the influence of religious ideas, often with a goal or mission in mind that they believe needs to be completed on arrival or during their stay. For example, affected persons may believe themselves to be important historical religious figures or may be influenced by important religious ideas or concepts (such as causing the coming of the Messiah or the second coming of Christ).

=== Type II ===
Jerusalem syndrome superimposed on and complicated by idiosyncratic ideas. This does not necessarily take the form of mental illness and may simply be a culturally anomalous obsession with the significance of Jerusalem, either as an individual, or as part of a small religious group with idiosyncratic spiritual beliefs.

=== Type III ===
Jerusalem syndrome as a discrete form, uncompounded by previous mental illness. This describes the best-known, if not the most common type, whereby a previously mentally balanced person becomes psychotic after arriving in Jerusalem. It can include a paranoid belief that an agency is after the individual, causing their symptoms of psychosis through poisoning and medicating.

Bar-El et al. reported 42 such cases over a period of 13 years, but in no case were they able to actually confirm that the condition was temporary.

== Prevalence ==
During a period of 13 years (1980–1993) for which admissions to the Kfar Shaul Mental Health Center in Jerusalem were analysed, it was reported that 1,200 tourists with severe, Jerusalem-themed mental problems were referred to this clinic. Of these, 470 were admitted to the hospital. On average, 100 such tourists have been seen annually, 40 of them requiring admission to the hospital. About three-and-a-half million tourists visit Jerusalem each year. Kalian and Witztum note that, as a proportion of the total number of tourists visiting the city, this is not significantly different from any other city.

== In popular culture ==
"The Jerusalem Syndrome", a theater play by Joshua Sobol, deals with the fanaticism that led to the destruction of the Jewish Second Temple.

In The X-Files (season 3, episode 11, "Revelations"), released in 1995, the perpetrator is depicted as having "Jerusalem Syndrome" after a visit to the city. He returns to the US and begins to hunt down people with signs of stigmata.

In Robert Stone's 1998 novel Damascus Gate, several characters are said to be afflicted with Jerusalem Syndrome.

The 2001 song "Jerusalem" was composed by James Raymond on the topic of the Jerusalem Syndrome. It appears on the 2001 record Just Like Gravity, by CPR (David Crosby, Jeff Pevar, James Raymond).

A 2006 film by Victor Braun titled Jerusalem Syndrome tells the story of a Christian pilgrim with the syndrome.

In The Simpsons 2010 episode "The Greatest Story Ever D'ohed", Homer develops Jerusalem syndrome while visiting Israel with his family as part of a tour group from Springfield. The illness and its effects on him become a central element of the episode's plot. Eventually, most members of the tour group are overcome with Jerusalem syndrome, each one proclaiming that he/she is the messiah.

In the 2014 ABC series Black Box, the episode "Jerusalem" (Season 1, Episode 5) features a character diagnosed with Jerusalem syndrome after he becomes suddenly and compulsively religious during a trip to Israel.

The 2015 movie Jeruzalem features a character that is suspected to have the Jerusalem syndrome.

"Jerusalem", the twelfth story in Neil Gaiman's 2015 collection Trigger Warning, centres around a British woman who comes down with the syndrome on holiday. She believes God is speaking to her and eventually flees her home to return to Jerusalem.

The catalog of the Metropolitan Museum of Art's 2016 show about an earlier era of the city's history used the syndrome as the "organizing metaphor" for the first paragraph of the introduction, per a review.

In 2023 the York Theatre Company produced "The Jerusalem Syndrome," a musical comedy written by Kyle Rosen, Laurence Holzman and Felicia Needleman, and directed by Don Stephenson. The 14-person cast included Farah Alvin and Lenny Wolpe.

== See also ==
- Culture shock – Experience of a person moving to a different cultural environment
- Foolishness for Christ – Flouting social norms for religious purposes
- Hyperreligiosity
- Jewish fundamentalism
- List of messiah claimants
- Messiah complex – Belief that one is a messiah or prophet
- Paris syndrome – Form of tourist disillusionment
- Religion and schizophrenia
- Religious delusion – Delusion involving religious themes
- Religious fanaticism
- Scrupulosity
- Stendhal syndrome – Psychosomatic condition of being overwhelmed by art or beauty
