= John Caponera =

American comedian and actor

- Born: 1959 (age 66–67); Chicago, Illinois
- Occupation: Comedian
- Years active: 1979–present
- Relatives: Cindy Caponera, sister
- Website: www.johncaponera.com

John Caponera (born 1959) is an American comedian and actor. He co-starred in the 1994 TV series The Good Life with Drew Carey. (Carey recalls Caponera as "one of the nicest, funniest, and hardest-working guys I've ever known".) Caponera's Harry Caray impersonation is one of his trademark bits. His material receives frequent airplay on XM Radio comedy channels.

Caponera played the part of Dave in the Bryan Spicer film For Richer or Poorer, starring Tim Allen and Kirstie Alley, as well as dozens of other acting parts.

== CDs and cassettes ==
- Comedy Comin' at Ya (1998), ASIN B00000AE88
- Live at Hilarities
- Rain Delay (2006)
- Total Sports Comedy
