= Media in The Simpsons =

Media is a recurring theme of satire in The Simpsons, an American animated sitcom created by Matt Groening for the Fox Broadcasting Company. The show is known for its satire of American popular culture and especially television culture, but has since its inception covered all types of media such as animation, journalism, commercials, comic books, movies, internet, and music. The series centers on a family and their life in a typical American town but the town of Springfield acts as a complete universe. The town features a vast array of media channels—from kids' television programming to local news, which enables the producers to make jokes about themselves and the entertainment industry. Most of The Simpsons media satire focuses on television. This is mainly done through three characters: Krusty the Clown, Sideshow Bob, and until 1998 Troy McClure. The Itchy & Scratchy Show is a show within a show, used as a satire of animation and in some cases The Simpsons itself. Topics include censorship, plagiarism, unoriginal writing, live-action clip shows and documentaries. Kent Brockman, Springfield's principal news presenter illustrates the glibness, amplification, and sensationalism of broadcast journalism. His tabloidization methods include making people look guilty without trial, and invasion of privacy by setting up camp outside people's homes.

== Background ==
The Simpsons is known for its satire of American popular culture and especially television culture. It uses the standard setup of a situation comedy, or sitcom, as its premise and centers on a family and their life in a typical American town. However, its animated nature gives the setting an unusually large scope. The town of Springfield acts as a complete universe in which characters can explore the issues faced by modern society. The town has a vast array of media channels—from children's television series to local news, which enables the producers to make jokes about themselves and the entertainment industry. On the radio, the citizens of Springfield have fictional radio stations such as KBBL-AM, KBBL-FM, KUDD, WKOMA, KJAZZ, KFSL, and WOMB.

Using The Simpsons as an example of Media literacy education, Jonathan Gray discusses the role that television, and specifically television parody, might play in teaching the techniques and rhetoric of television to audiences.

Several characters have a role in this satire. Krusty the Clown is a hard-living entertainment veteran, who has his own show: The Krusty the Klown Show, which is aimed towards a children's audience and has many followers, including Bart Simpson. He is sometimes depicted as a jaded, burned out has-been, who has been down and out several times and remains addicted to gambling, cigarettes, alcohol, Percodan, Pepto-Bismol, and Xanax. He instantly becomes depressed as soon as the cameras stop rolling; In his book Planet Simpson: How a Cartoon Masterpiece Documented an Era and Defined a Generation, author Chris Turner describes Krusty as "the wizened veteran, the total pro" who lives the celebrity life but is miserable and needs his celebrity status. Krusty has been described as "the consummate showman who can't bear the possibility of not being on the air and not entertaining people". His television shows are of mixed quality and all of his merchandise is of low quality, to the point of being potentially dangerous.

While Krusty represents low culture, Sideshow Bob represents high culture. He began his career as the non-speaking sidekick on Krusty the Clown's television show. Frustrated by his early role as the target of "Krusty's cheap gags", Bob frames Krusty and takes over the show. He changes the content of that show to present readings of classic literature and segments examining the emotional lives of pre-teens. He believes that by exposing the kids to high culture he will improve their lives. Arnold writes that "Bob's own conscience and morality are clearly unaffected by the high culture he represents." He also tries to "manipulate the tastes of the masses" by becoming a criminal mastermind. In the book Leaving Springfield, David L. G. Arnold comments that Bart is a product of a "mass-culture upbringing" and thus is Bob's enemy. Turner writes that Bob is built into a highbrow snob and conservative Republican so that the writers can continually hit him with a rake and bring him down.

Troy McClure is a stereotypical Hollywood has-been. He was a star in the early 1970s, but his career went downhill due to rumors of a paraphilia involving fish. In most of his appearances in the show, he hosts short video clips that other characters watch on television or in a public place. He often presents educational videos and infomercials. Turner argues that "the smarmy Hollywood type...has been done to death, but Hartman's version breathed new life into it with each appearance. McClure has become the apotheosis of the stereotype, a gut-achingly funny reinterpretation whose trademark introduction...has become a shorthand way to describe any grossly artificial media figure." In addition to his in-story appearances, McClure appears as host of "The Simpsons 138th Episode Spectacular" and "The Simpsons Spin-Off Showcase".

=== Network notes ===
Back when The Simpsons was developed as a half hour show, co-creator James L. Brooks negotiated an unusual provision in the contract with the Fox network that prevented Fox from interfering with the show's content. He was able to do that, because Fox back then was a minor fledgling network. Former showrunner Bill Oakley considered working on the show to be similar to working in a bubble due to the lack of interference from the Fox network's executives, as is commonplace on other shows. This allowed them to produce any episodes they wanted, as showrunner Josh Weinstein commented: "The great thing about The Simpsons is that we pretty much were able to get away with everything, so there weren't any episodes we really wanted to do that we couldn't do. Even the crazy high-concept ones like 'Two Bad Neighbors' and 'Homer's Enemy' we managed to put on the air because honestly there were no network execs there to stop us."

Network notes were parodied at the beginning of the episode "Day of the Jackanapes". Krusty is shown being pestered by network executives who comment on every choice he makes. He announces his departure of The Krusty the Klown Show after the executives give him notes during filming of a sketch. At the end of the episode, Mr. Teeny is uncertain of where he should throw the plastic explosives that Bart wore. When he sees the two executives discussing in a room, he throws it onto them. Instead of dying of the explosion however, the pieces of the executives reconstitute into what Jean describes as a "super-executive". These sequences were inspired by Jean's dissatisfaction with some network executives, who he felt took control over a television series he was working on before he returned to The Simpsons in 1999. "I had just worked on a show on another network [...] we had a show where there were a lot of notes from executives", Jean said of the inspiration for the scenes. In "The Itchy & Scratchy & Poochie Show" The Simpsons writers mocks the notion of network executives forcing ideas onto a show. The interaction between the writers and the network executives in the episode underscore the differences between them. The writers understand the show's inner workings, but the network executives' approach improvements to the show from a business point-of-view. They try to incorporate what they see as a rebellious character into a failing television show with the comment "This is popular with the kids", but the viewers later reject the character.

The Fox network itself is often the target of jokes. In "Missionary: Impossible" the episode cuts away from the main story near the end to a telethon, populated by Bender (from Futurama), Thurgood Stubbs (from The PJs), Hank Hill (from King of the Hill), Luke Perry (Dylan in Beverly Hills, 90210), David Duchovny and Gillian Anderson (Mulder and Scully from The X-Files), and the owner of the Fox network Rupert Murdoch. The host, Betty White, tells the viewers "So if you don't want to see crude, lowbrow programming disappear from the airwaves ... please call now". In "The Simpsons Spin-Off Showcase," Troy McClure explains that the Fox network had approached the producers of The Simpsons to create "thirty-five new shows to fill a few holes in their programming line-up". He then shows the viewers a weekly programming schedule consisting of only The Simpsons, The X-files, and Melrose Place surrounded by question marks. Matt Groening notes in an interview that The Simpsons is in a unique place, and when former producers/writers move to different networks, they are told that "We would never have The Simpsons on our network". On this issue Robert Sloane concludes in Leaving Springfield that "In sum, the show seems to defy certain industry practices."

== Television ==
=== Unoriginal writing ===
The episode "The Simpsons Spin-Off Showcase" was a satire over unoriginal, poor television writing and references and parodies many TV shows. The episode features three spin-off ideas for The Simpsons show, which also functions as a critique of spin-offs in general. Troy McClure introduces the three spin-offs as a host of the episode, something he had previously done in the episode "The Simpsons 138th Episode Spectacular". Creator Matt Groening was uneasy about the idea, feeling that it could be mistranslated as actually poor sitcom writing. He also did not like the idea of breaking the fourth wall and the concept of saying that the Simpsons were just actors in a television show. The three segments were:

- Chief Wiggum, P.I. is a parody of police-dramas, such as Miami Vice, Magnum, P.I. and Starsky & Hutch. Seymour Skinner emulates Don Johnson from Miami Vice in order to look scruffier.
- The Love-matic Grampa is a parody of fantasy sitcoms such as Mister Ed, I Dream of Jeannie and Bewitched as well as having similarities to My Mother the Car. The segment demanded a different approach to directing than a usual The Simpsons episode. Director Neil Affleck had to emulate a three-camera setup, as is normally used in sitcoms.
- The Simpson Family Smile-Time Variety Hour is a parody of the 1960s and 1970s live variety shows. Mainly it is a parody of The Brady Bunch Hour, a short-lived spin-off of the 1970s sitcom The Brady Bunch. The replacement of Lisa in the third segment with another girl reflects the recasting of Jan Brady in the Brady Bunch Hour when Eve Plumb refused to participate. The Simpson family is made to look like The Partridge Family. Also, the segment holds numerous references to Laugh-In, The Sonny & Cher Comedy Hour, and The Smothers Brothers Comedy Hour.

Catchphrase-based humor was mocked in the episode "Bart Gets Famous". The writers chose the phrase "I didn't do it" because they wanted a "lousy" phrase "to point out how really crummy things can become really popular". It was also an intentional call back to the first season episode "Krusty Gets Busted" where it was a catchphrase of Krusty the Clown. When people in the episode eventually got tired of the catchphrase "I didn't do it", Lisa tells Bart that now "you can go back to just being you, instead of a one-dimensional character with a silly catchphrase". The episode ends with a self-referential scene in which several characters say their catchphrases, including the Simpsons, Ned Flanders, Nelson Muntz, Mr. Burns and Barney Gumble.

The episode "Behind the Laughter" was a parody of the music documentary series Behind the Music, which was popular during the episode's production. It tells the fictional history of the Simpson family and how they got into show business; from their weak beginnings to their exceptional prosperity. A television show, a recording contract, a lot of awards, and countless wealth follow Homer's inadequate video "pilot". It took the writers a long time to conceptualize the show, as they were unsure whether to make Homer a filmmaker or make the characters unaware they were being filmed. The writers had particular fun writing over the top, melodramatic lines "tortured metaphors," many of which were penned by producer David Mirkin. Part of the imitating of Behind the Music was using the "corny, stock interstitial footage to amp up the drama of the situation".

In the clip show "The Simpsons 138th Episode Spectacular", the entire setup of Troy McClure presenting the episode is a parody of the practice by live-action series to produce clip shows in general. The parody was done by celebrating a completely random milestone and by making exaggerated use of the conventions of traditional highlight shows, such as a grand introduction and relentlessly showbizzy host. Considered a spoof of television clip shows, the episode is seen drawing attention to prevailing televisual conventions and reminds viewers that The Simpsons itself participates actively in that same cultural legacy. Simone Knox referred to it in her article Reading the Ungraspable Double-Codedness of "The Simpsons" as not simply a clip show, "but a ‘clip show’ that looks at the series with a sense of hyper-self-consciousness about its own textuality". Since "Gump Roast", there have not been any more clip shows. The show now instead produces episodes with three adaptations of existing stories for each act, called "trilogy episodes", rendering a clip show unnecessary.

=== Self reflectivity ===
We wanted to do an episode where the thinking was "What if a real life, normal person had to enter Homer's universe and deal with him?" I know this episode is controversial and divisive, but I just love it. It really feels like what would happen if a real, somewhat humorless human had to deal with Homer. There was some talk [on NoHomers.net] about the ending—we just did that because (a) it’s really funny and shocking, (2) we like the lesson of "sometimes, you just can't win"—the whole Frank Grimes episode is a study in frustration and hence Homer has the last laugh and (3) we wanted to show that in real life, being Homer Simpson could be really dangerous and life threatening, as Frank Grimes sadly learned.

— Josh Weinstein on "Homer's Enemy" in an interview.

One of the goals of showrunners Bill Oakley and Josh Weinstein was to create several episodes in each season which would "push the envelope conceptually". The idea for the episode "Homer's Enemy" was first conceived by Oakley who thought that Homer should have an enemy. The thought evolved into the concept of a "real world" co-worker who would either love or hate Homer. The writers chose the latter as they thought it would have funnier results. The result was the character of Grimes, a man who had to work hard all his life with nothing to show for it, and is dismayed and embittered by Homer's success and comfort in spite of his inherent laziness and ignorance.

"Homer's Enemy" explores the comic possibilities of a realistic character with a strong work ethic placed alongside Homer in a work environment. In an essay for the book Leaving Springfield, Robert Sloane describes the episode as "an incisive consideration of The Simpsons's world. Although The Simpsons is known for its self-reflectivity, the show had never looked at (or critiqued) itself as directly as it does in ["Homer's Enemy"]." In the episode, Homer is portrayed as an everyman and the embodiment of the American spirit; however, in some scenes his negative characteristics and silliness are prominently highlighted. By the close of the episode, Grimes, a hard working and persevering "real American hero," is relegated to the role of antagonist; it is intended that the viewer be pleased that Homer has emerged victorious.

The episode "Behind the Laughter" is also largely self-referential. A series of T-shirts are shown sporting a number of Bart Simpson catchphrases: "You bet your sweet bippy, man." "Life begins at conception, man." These are parodies of both officially licensed and bootleg Simpsons-themed T-shirts in the early days of the series, usually revolving around Bart. The famous scene of Homer plummeting off the jagged cliffs after trying to jump Springfield Gorge on Bart's skateboard from the season two episode "Bart the Daredevil" is shown, however, "Behind the Laughter" shows us the "unfunny aftermath" of Homer going through physical rehabilitation and becoming addicted to pain pills. The episode states the series turned to "gimmicky premises and nonsensical plots" as ratings dipped, and uses a clip from the season nine episode "The Principal and the Pauper" to get that point across: a highly controversial episode that many fans and critics panned.

"The Itchy & Scratchy & Poochie Show" mainly deals with themes commonly known as "jumping the shark," instances that usually occur when a failing show adds a new character or twist to boost ratings. Before production of season eight began, Fox executives suggested the staff to add a new character to the show, who would live with the Simpsons on a permanent basis. The staff, amused with the idea, decided to write this episode as a commentary on what it was like to work on a television show that had been on the air for several years. Parallel to Poochie being introduced on Itchy & Scratchy, they inserted the one-time character Roy, with no explanation as to who he was, or why he was there, as a reference to the executive's proposal. Usually, this is a technique used in shows that involves children who have grown up. This was the case in "Oliver" in The Brady Bunch or "Luke" on Growing Pains. The episode was intended to be a commentary on what it was like to work on a television show that had been on the air for a long time but was nearing its end. It was intended to show that The Simpsons could still be good after eight seasons, even though it no longer had the "shock value" it did in the early years. The Simpsons would, in a later episode "The Simpsons Spin-Off Showcase," mock the addition of The Great Gazoo into some of the final episodes of The Flintstones by stating that, in future episodes, Homer would meet a green space alien named Ozmodiar that only he can see.

=== Commercialism ===
Television advertisements are also parodied. As an example there is a song and visual sequence in the episode "The Last Temptation of Krust" that was modeled after Ford commercials. The sequence is a parody of a commercial for a sport utility vehicle, and Hank Williams Jr. sings a song about the fictional "Canyonero" accompanied by country guitar music and whip cracks. The song "Canyonero" closely resembles the theme to the 1960s television series Rawhide. The first verse of the song is: "Can you name the car with a four-wheel drive / Smells like a steak and seats thirty-five? / Canyonero! / Canyonero!" Turner wrote positively of the Canyonero spoof piece in Planet Simpson, calling it "a brilliant parody of an SUV ad". In an article in the journal Environmental Politics Steve Vanderheiden commented that the Canyonero reflected an "anti-SUV" stance by The Simpsons. In an article in the San Francisco Chronicle about SUV owners, Vicki Haddock wrote "SUV owners have become something of a punch line, succinctly captured in a "Simpsons" parody touting the apocryphal Canyonero [...]"

In his book Watching with The Simpsons: Television, Parody, and Intertextuality, Jonathan Gray analyses a scene from the episode "Girly Edition" in which it is announced that Kidz News has been replaced by the children's cartoon The Mattel and Mars Bar Quick Energy Chocobot Hour (a reference to the Mattel toys and the Mars chocolate bar). He says this mocks "how many children's programs have become little more than the ad to the merchandise". Gray also writes that The Simpsons "illustrates how the ad as genre has itself already invaded many, if not all, genres. Ads and marketing do not limit themselves to the space between programs; rather, they are themselves textual invaders, and part of The Simpsons' parodic attack on ads involves revealing their hiding places in other texts."

== Animation ==
The Itchy & Scratchy Show is a show within a show that appears occasionally in episodes of The Simpsons. They typically appear in the form of 15-60 second cartoons that are filled with over-the-top violence, usually initiated by Itchy the mouse against Scratchy the cat; Itchy is almost always the victor. The show is usually a parody of traditional cartoons or takeoffs on famous films, but the plot and content are always violent. The most direct and obvious example is Tom and Jerry, an animated series which was also about a constant battle between a cat and a mouse, with the mouse usually victorious. Itchy and Scratchy cartoons are often added when a show needs expanding or when there is an issue that the writers wish to satirize. In some cases, notably in "The Itchy & Scratchy & Poochie Show", the writers use Itchy & Scratchy as a way to comment on The Simpsons.

Several episodes that centered on Itchy and Scratchy dealt with censorship issues. In the episode "Itchy & Scratchy & Marge", Marge successfully forms a protest group that forces network to take Itchy and Scratchy off the air, citing the cartoon violence unsuitable for children. The episode was partially inspired by Terry Rakolta, who protested the Fox network over the show Married... with Children. When Itchy and Scratchy are cancelled, the kids of Springfield resort to playing in a wholesome manner. The montage was a satirical point by saying the opposite of what the writers believed. For the episode, which handles a large issue, the writers tried not to have a point of view and looked at both sides, despite what the writers personally felt. The episode "Itchy & Scratchy Land" was written as a response to new, more stringent censorship laws that had been put in place. As a result, the Fox network tried to stop the writers from including Itchy & Scratchy cartoons in episodes. In response, the writers created this episode, which they decided would be as violent as possible. The network threatened that if the episode was produced, they would cut the Itchy & Scratchy parts out themselves, but relented when showrunner David Mirkin threatened to tell the media. Mirkin further tried to put "as much blood and guts" into the episode "Treehouse of Horror V" as he could. He had received several complaints by the United States Congress about the amount of violence on the show and he did not like their attempt to censor it. The episode was later described as "the most [...] disturbing Halloween show ever" by Mirkin. The episode begins with Marge warning that the episode that is about to air has so much guts and violence that Congress will not let them show it. The three main segments are linked with Groundskeeper Willie being killed in all three of them. The first segment has Homer attempting to kill the rest of the family, the second segment has Homer killing anything and everything in the prehistoric past, and the final segment revolves around Springfield Elementary eating children. To top it off, the Simpsons do a song and dance number, with their insides turned inside out, over the closing credits.

The Itchy & Scratchy Show-related episode "The Day the Violence Died" functioned as a vehicle for jokes about animation and plagiarism. In the episode, the owner of the Itchy and Scratchy characters is accused of fraud, when the original authorship of the characters comes into question. When the owner pleads his case in court, he mentions that several animated television series and characters were plagiarized from other series and characters: "Animation is built on plagiarism! If it weren't for someone plagiarizing The Honeymooners, we wouldn't have The Flintstones. If someone hadn't ripped off Sergeant Bilko, there'd be no Top Cat!. Huckleberry Hound, Chief Wiggum, Yogi Bear? Andy Griffith, Edward G. Robinson, Art Carney!"

== Journalism ==
The character Kent Brockman functions as The Simpsons's main character for news parodies. He was based on Los Angeles anchormen Hal Fishman and Jerry Dunphy, and modeled after anchorman Ted Koppel. Another influence on the character was The Mary Tyler Moore Show's Ted Baxter, played by Ted Knight. His role on The Simpsons is to host the news as the fictional television channel, Channel 6's anchorman. In addition to the news, he also hosts the programs Eye on Springfield and Smartline. Brockman is joined by Scott Christian and Arnie Pye on the Channel 6 news team. Originally, Scott Christian was the anchor and Brockman was the field reporter, but the show shifted focus to Brockman. Arnie Pye is a helicopter-based traffic reporter that sometimes helps with field reports other than traffic.

In most of his appearances, Brockman seems more interested in entertaining the viewers than informing them of real news. In "Homer Loves Flanders" Brockman calls the United States Army a "kill-bot factory" in a news broadcast. Mirkin said this was a joke the staff "particularly loved to do" because it pointed out how negative and mean-spirited news broadcasts can be, and how they are seemingly "always trying to scare everybody" by creating panic and depression. Turner said that "in Brockman's journalism, we see some of the modern news media's ugliest biases", of which he says are glibness, amplification, and sensationalism. MSN called Brockman one of the worst TV news anchors.

A real-life journalist named Reid, who Gray interviewed for his book, states that the episode "Girly Edition" mirrors well how some journalists actually work. She said the episode shows "the ludicrous nature of, you know, what we do in a lot of things. The kids news with Bart and Lisa: I mean, you see them do really stupid stories about the news, and 'news you can use,' and 'how to get rid of your sheets when you wet them.' I mean, people really do stories like that." Steven Keslowitz writes in his book The World According to the Simpsons that the episode showcases the fact that "the viewing of attractive newscasters and the use of persuasive tones of voice often do have an impact on the minds of many intelligent members of American society." With that said, the episode parodies the relationship between hard and intelligent journalism championed by Lisa and the "Up Close and Personal" style preferred by Bart.

Similar to the show's parody of the Fox network, The Simpsons also makes jokes about Fox News. Near the beginning of the episode "The Fool Monty", a Fox News helicopter can be seen, with the slogan "Fox News: Not Racist, But #1 With Racists". Bill O'Reilly, host of the Fox News show The O'Reilly Factor, aired the clip during the show's "Pinheads and Patriots" segment, saying "Continuing to bite the hand that feeds part of it, Fox broadcasting once again allows its cartoon characters to run wild." After the clip aired, he said "Pinheads? I believe so." In response, the producers added a brief scene at the beginning of the opening sequence of the following episode with a helicopter that bears the slogan "Fox News: Unsuitable for Viewers Under 75." According to showrunner Al Jean, the producers of the show were pleased that they had annoyed O'Reilly, and that they had never received a warning from Fox about making jokes about the network. He added, "Both ends of it benefit the ultimate News Corp. agenda,” Jean said. “We’re happy to have a little feud with Bill O’Reilly. That’s a very entertaining thing for us."

Other journalistic media are satirized as well. "Homer Badman" is a satire of shows like Hard Copy. David Mirkin, the show runner at the time, felt very strongly about the "tabloidization of the media" and has said that the episode is as current today as it was at the time and things have since gotten worse. Several gags in the episode are based on what real life shows like Hard Copy would do, such as making people look to be guilty without a trial as well as a complete invasion of privacy by setting up camp outside people's homes. The talk show "Ben" reflects the writers' feeling that anyone could host a talk show because all they need is a microphone and an audience. This leads to Homer using public access TV to try to clear his name. The character Birch Barlow, who hosts a conservative radio talk show in Springfield, is a take-off of American talk show host and political commentator Rush Limbaugh.

Springfield has its own local newspaper, The Springfield Shopper. The newspaper is often isolated from mainstream media, so the characters do not seem to know of other ones. Dave Shutton is a reporter for The Springfield Shopper. He became less used since the episode "Two Cars in Every Garage and Three Eyes on Every Fish" and has been reduced to cameo appearances and appearances in crowd scenes. Other newspapers are seldom mentioned on the show. In his book Watching with The Simpsons: Television, Parody, and Intertextuality, Jonathan Gray discusses a scene from "Homer Defined" that shows Homer reading a USA Today with the cover story: "America's Favorite Pencil – #2 is #1". Lisa sees this title and criticizes the newspaper as a "flimsy hodge-podge of high-brass factoids and Larry King", to which Homer responds that it is "the only paper in America that's not afraid to tell the truth: that everything is just fine." In the book, Gray says this scene is used by the show's producers to criticize "how often the news is wholly toothless, sacrificing journalism for sales, and leaving us not with important public information, but with America's Favorite Pencil".

== Internet ==
Four months after the airing of a first episode "Simpsons Roasting on an Open Fire", the newsgroup alt.tv.simpsons was created by Gary D. Duzan during the third week of March 1990. It was created before there was a World Wide Web, which emerged in 1993, so those earliest discussions were held on text-only platforms. According to Turner, the newsgroup was among the most trafficked newsgroups of the early 1990s. The comments of alt.tv.simpsons have been quoted or cited in the writings of mass media commentators. This has led to situations in which relations between writers and viewers have become strained. In 1994, Simpsons creator Matt Groening acknowledged he and the other showrunners have been reading the newsgroup and in frustration said, "Sometimes I feel like knocking their electronic noggins together". Showrunner Bill Oakley used to respond to select Simpsons fans through e-mail in a friendly manner, but by 1996 claimed "[t]here are people who take it seriously to the point of absurdity".

The writers often use the character Comic Book Guy to satirize and respond to the alt.tv.simpsons community. In this scene he is logging on to alt.nerd.obsessive, a parody of alt.tv.simpsons.

The writers sometimes make jokes at the newsgroup's expense. Within the series, the character Comic Book Guy is often used to represent a stereotypical inhabitant of alt.tv.simpsons. The first such instance occurred in the seventh season episode "Radioactive Man", in which Comic Book Guy is logging on to his favorite newsgroup alt.nerd.obsessive. Comic Book Guy's oft-repeated catchphrase, "Worst episode ever", first appeared on alt.tv.simpsons in an episode review and writer David S. Cohen decided to use this fan response to lampoon the passion and the fickleness of the fans. In the chapter "Who Wants Candy" in the book Leaving Springfield, Robert Sloane finds alt.tv.simpsons an example of an "active audience ... who struggle to make their own meaning out of the show". He mentions that in this context, the fans nitpick the show to an extreme and allow no room for error, where the writers believe that nitpicking leads to an under appreciation of the show's qualities. Turner writes in the book Planet Simpson that The Simpsons appeared tailor-made for a newsgroup in the early 1990s because it includes minor details that reward attentive viewing and can be easily scrutinized. The episode "The Itchy & Scratchy & Poochie Show" deals with the viewer backlash and obsession with internal consistency. When the character Comic Book Guy saw that the television show The Itchy & Scratchy Show added a new character, called Poochie, he immediately goes on the internet and writes "Worst episode ever" on a message board; a commentary on how the active audience nit picks the episode. The writers respond by using the voice of Bart:

Bart: Hey, I know it wasn't great, but what right do you have to complain?
Comic Book Guy: As a loyal viewer, I feel they owe me.
Bart: What? They're giving you thousands of hours of entertainment for free. What could they possibly owe you? I mean, if anything, you owe them!
Comic Book Guy: Worst episode ever.

In 2011, the producers let the users of the Internet vote over what direction The Simpsons should take. In the twenty-second season finale "The Ned-Liest Catch", the characters Ned Flanders and Edna Krabappel started dating. The episode ends with Homer and Marge Simpson giving the viewers a link to the official The Simpsons website, TheSimpsons.com, and encouraging them to go on the website and vote over the summer of 2011 on whether Ned and Edna should stay together. Showrunner Al Jean said in an interview that the writers decided it would not be interesting for them to do another episode where a relationship ended, and they thought it would be interesting "to see what people think, [...] the Internet certainly has a lot of opinion on the show, might as well have them have their say." When asked why the writers thought Ned and Edna were the right characters for a cliffhanger like this, Jean said that "In life, unusual things happen. People couple together in ways you would not expect, and he's single and she's single. We thought it would be funny, the fact that they both have these connections to the Simpsons but they never really met or if they have met it was minimal." The result of the poll was revealed in the season 23 premiere "The Falcon and the D'ohman". According to Jean, the poll was "very strong in one direction". He assured in an interview before the result was presented that the poll was authentic and the writers would not undo the viewers' decision, and added that "What our fans have joined together, let no writer tear asunder."

"I Am Furious (Yellow)" references the dot-com bubble, a speculative bubble covering roughly 1995–2000. In their article "15 Simpsons Moments That Perfectly Captured Their Eras", The A.V. Club wrote: "By April 2002, the dot-com bubble of the late '90s had been popped for a couple of years, taking with it myriad Internet start-ups. A sobering soul-searching settled in their place, which The Simpsons captured in this episode about Bart creating a popular Internet cartoon called Angry Dad. Touring the laid-back start-up that hosts the cartoons, Lisa asks head honcho Todd Linux about their business model. 'How many shares of stock will it take to end this conversation?' he retorts. Lisa asks for two million, which Linux grabs from a paper-towel dispenser. When Bart and Lisa return later, the company has gone bust, and Linux is stealing copper wire out of the walls." The episode was also partly based on some of The Simpsons staff members' experience with making internet cartoons, such as Queer Duck and Hard Drinkin' Lincoln, both of which were created by former showrunner Mike Reiss. In his article "Best Indicator Ever: The Simpsons Foreclosure", Jonathan Hoenig of SmartMoney wrote that the twentieth season episode "No Loan Again, Naturally", an episode in which the Simpsons are foreclosed from their house, could have indicated that "the worst of the housing crisis" at the time the article was written, was over. Hoenig based this theory on the fact that shortly after "I Am Furious (Yellow)", which satirizes the dot-com bubble, aired, the dotcom stocks "began a massive rebound from bear-market lows".

In the episode "The Computer Wore Menace Shoes", Homer buys a computer and creates his own website to spread fake news. He defends his action towards Bart by stating "Real news is great, son, but I'm getting a thousand hits an hour with Grade A bull plop". In his review of The Simpsons: The Complete Twelfth Season, DVD Movie Guide's Colin Jacobson wrote that he enjoyed the episode's take on "Internet idiocy". He wrote, "Some parts of it feel dated, but the web features even more ill-informed opinions today than it did nine years ago, so much of it remains timeless and on target."

== Films ==
Rainier Wolfcastle is an action hero star and a close parody of actor/bodybuilder/politician Arnold Schwarzenegger. The writers invented Wolfcastle as the action hero McBain for the episode "Oh Brother, Where Art Thou?" and the McBain films were meant to satirize clichés of action movies. In the episode "The Boy Who Knew Too Much", Bart Simpson tells Wolfcastle that his "last movie really sucked" with Chief Wiggum adding "Magic Ticket, my ass, McBain!", alluding to Schwarzenegger's film Last Action Hero, which was panned by critics. Wolfcastle owns a restaurant named Planet Springfield, a parody of Planet Hollywood, which Schwarzenegger co-owned with other celebrities. The episode "Radioactive Man" sees the film version of the comic book series Radioactive Man set up production in Springfield with Wolfcastle starring as the title role. Radioactive Man is a fictional superhero within The Simpsons, who works as a parody of comic books and superheroes in general. The authors of the book I Can't Believe It's a Bigger and Better Updated Unofficial Simpsons Guide, Gary Russell and Gareth Roberts, called the episode a "wonderful pastiche" on the Tim Burton Batman films, and several scenes in the episode reference the Batman television series from the 1960s.

In the later episode "Homer the Whopper", writers Seth Rogen and Evan Goldberg wanted to show how Hollywood generally ruins superhero films. He said that "the whole joke is that Homer is cast to play a guy who's an everyman and they try to make him into this physically fit guy." Rogen also noted that the plot mirrors the situation he was in while working on the film The Green Hornet, when he had to lose weight and do physical training for his role. Showrunner Al Jean commented that the writers tried not to repeat the comic book film theme from the "Radioactive Man" episode. Instead they decided to parody the fact that almost every comic book has been turned into a film. Jean commented that that scene in the episode in which the studio executives "are trying to think up an idea that hasn't been done really is what they are doing these days [in real life]".

In the season eleven episode "E-I-E-I-(Annoyed Grunt)", The Simpsons go to a screening of The Poke of Zorro, which is largely a parody of the Zorro film The Mask of Zorro (1998). Jonathan Gray wrote in Watching with The Simpsons: Television, Parody, and Intertextuality that The Poke of Zorro "ridicules the outlandishness of Hollywood blockbuster fare," especially its "blatant historical inaccuracies" which sees the film feature Zorro, King Arthur, the Three Musketeers, the Scarlet Pimpernel, "the Man in the Iron Mask and ninjas in nineteenth century Mexico". The Buzz Cola advertisement shown before The Poke of Zorro is a parody of the opening Normandy invasion sequence from the film Saving Private Ryan (1998). Gray writes that it "scorns the proclivity of ads to use any gimmick to grab attention, regardless of the ethics: as an indignant Lisa asks incredulously, 'Do they really think cheapening the memory of our veterans will sell soda?'"

== Music ==
Michael Dunne analyzed the episode "All Singing, All Dancing" in his book American Film Musical Themes and Forms, and gave examples from it while explaining that singing and dancing performances are generally not seen as acceptable in the television medium. He notes that Homer calls singing "fruity" and "the lowest form of communication" during the episode. However, Dunne also notes the fact that Homer himself sings "his objection that musicals are fake and phony". Dunne describes the frame narrative as establishing Marge as "..more favorably disposed toward musicals than the males in her house". Dunne concluded that "musicals come out on top in this episode, but the victory is marginal at best." Of the episode itself, Dunne wrote that "..the parodies contained in the show demonstrate that its creators are familiar enough with various forms of musical performance to echo them and confident enough that their viewers will catch the references."

In the episode "The Springfield Connection", Homer and Marge went to an outdoor performance by the Springfield Pops orchestra. The orchestra plays the theme to the Star Wars films, and Homer mistakenly believes that the theme's composer John Williams is dead, complaining: "Laser effects, mirrored balls—John Williams must be rolling around in his grave!". Kurt M. Koenigsberger analyzes Homer's comments in his piece: "Commodity Culture and Its Discontents: Mr. Bennett, Bart Simpson, and the Rhetoric of Modernism" published in the compilation work Leaving Springfield: The Simpsons and the Possibility of Oppositional Culture edited by John Alberti. Koenigsberger comments: "The joke in this opening scene involves a confusion of high and popular artistic production: Marge treats the Springfield Pops as 'culture' and expects that the usually boorish Homer will need to be drawn into the spectacle." However, Koenigsberger notes that Homer actually regards Star Wars as a "classic", implying that a "classic" work must have a musical composer that is deceased, and be devoid of light-shows or glitter balls. Koenigsberger uses this example to discuss Homer's application of "a strategy characteristic of literary modernism".

== Bibliography ==
- Alberti, John, ed. (2003). Leaving Springfield: The Simpsons and the Possibility of Oppositional Culture. Detroit: Wayne State University Press. ISBN 0-8143-2849-0.
  - Arnold, David L. G. ""Use a Pen, Sideshow Bob": The Simpsons and the Threat of High Culture". In Alberti (2003), pp. 1–28.
  - Koenigsberger, Kurt M. "Commodity Culture and Its Discontents: Mr. Bennett, Bart Simpson. and the Rhetoric of Modernism". In Alberti (2003), pp. 29–62.
  - Chow, Valerie Weilunn. "Homer Erectus: Homer Simpson As Everyman ... and Every Woman". In Alberti (2003), pp. 107–136.
  - Sloane, Robert. "Who Wants Candy? Disenchantment in The Simpsons". In Alberti (2003), pp. 137–171.
- Booker, M. Keith (2006). Drawn to television: prime-time animation from the Flintstones to Family guy. Praeger Publishers. ISBN 0-275-99019-2.
- Dunne, Michael (2004). American Film Musical Themes and Forms. McFarland & Company. ISBN 0-7864-1877-X.
- Gray, Jonathan (2006). Watching with The Simpsons: Television, Parody, and Intertextuality. Taylor & Francis. ISBN 978-0-415-36202-3.
- Groening, Matt (1997). Richmond, Ray; Coffman, Antonia (eds.). The Simpsons: A Complete Guide to Our Favorite Family (1st ed.). New York: HarperPerennial. ISBN 978-0-06-095252-5. LCCN 98141857. OCLC 37796735. OL 433519M.
- Keslowitz, Steven (2006). The World According to the Simpsons: What Our Favorite TV Family Says about Life, Love, and the Pursuit of the Perfect Donut. Sourcebooks. ISBN 978-1-4022-0655-9.
- Ott, Brian L. (2007). The Small Screen: How Television Equips Us to Live in the Information Age. Blackwell Publishing. ISBN 978-1-4051-6154-1.
- Turner, Chris (2004). Planet Simpson: How a Cartoon Masterpiece Documented an Era and Defined a Generation. Foreword by Douglas Coupland. (1st ed.). Toronto: Random House Canada. ISBN 978-0-679-31318-2. OCLC 55682258.

Journals

- Knox, Simone (2006). "Reading the Ungraspable Double-Codedness of "The Simpsons"". Journal of Popular Film and Television. 34 (2). Heldref Publications: 73–81. doi:10.3200/JPFT.34.2.73-81. ISSN 0195-6051. S2CID 192104303.
- Moran, Fran (2009), Popular Democracy and Citizen Engagement: Lessons from Springfield (PDF), Jersey City, New Jersey, US: New Jersey City University, archived from the original (PDF) on April 15, 2012
- Vanderheiden, Steve (February 2006). "Assessing the case against the SUV". Environmental Politics. 15 (1): 23. Bibcode:2006EnvPo..15...23V. doi:10.1080/09644010500418688. S2CID 55846686.
- Woo, Stephanie (December 2004), The Scoop on The Simpsons: Journalism in U.S. Television's Longest Running Prime-Time Animated Series (PDF), University of Southern California
