= The Itchy & Scratchy & Poochie Show =

- The Simpsons episode
- Episode no.: Season 8 Episode 14
- Directed by: Steven Dean Moore
- Written by: David X. Cohen
- Production code: 4F12
- Original air date: February 9, 1997

Guest appearances
- Alex Rocco as Roger Meyers Jr.; Phil Hartman as Troy McClure

Episode features
- Couch gag: A parody of the Sgt. Pepper's album cover.
- Commentary: Matt Groening; Josh Weinstein; David X. Cohen; Yeardley Smith; Alex Rocco; Steven Dean Moore

Episode chronology
← Previous "Simpsoncalifragilisticexpiala(Annoyed Grunt)cious"	Next → "Homer's Phobia"
- The Simpsons season 8

"The Itchy & Scratchy & Poochie Show" is the fourteenth episode of the eighth season of the American animated television series The Simpsons. It originally aired on the Fox network in the United States on February 9, 1997. In the episode, The Itchy & Scratchy Show attempts to regain lost viewers by introducing a new character named Poochie, voiced by Homer. The episode is largely self-referential and satirizes the world of television production, fans of The Simpsons, and the series itself. It was written by David X. Cohen and directed by Steven Dean Moore. Alex Rocco is a credited guest voice as Roger Meyers Jr. for the third and final time (having previously provided the character's voice in "Itchy & Scratchy & Marge" and "The Day the Violence Died"); Phil Hartman also guest stars as Troy McClure. Poochie became a minor recurring character and Comic Book Guy's catchphrase, "Worst episode ever", is introduced in this episode.

With this episode, the show's 167th episode, The Simpsons surpassed The Flintstones in the number of episodes produced for a prime-time animated series, which had 166 episodes.

== Plot ==
Krusty the Clown threatens to stop broadcasting The Itchy & Scratchy Show because the cartoon causes his show's ratings to plummet during the segment when it airs. Roger Meyers Jr. gathers a focus group of children to discover why The Itchy & Scratchy Show isn't as popular as it once was. In the focus group, Lisa explains that it's not the cartoon that's bad, it's that the characters have lost their impact on audiences after being on the air for so long.

Meyers decides that the cartoon needs a new character in an effort to appeal to a younger audience: Poochie, a dog with an "attitude" who surfs, raps, and plays electric guitar. At Bart and Lisa's suggestion, Homer auditions to be the voice of Poochie and gets the role. To promote Poochie's debut, Homer and veteran voice actor June Bellamy, who provides the voices of Itchy and Scratchy, make several publicity stops, where they encounter the show's hardcore fans. Homer invites his friends and relatives to watch the first Itchy & Scratchy & Poochie Show. However, the cartoon largely consists of Poochie spouting meaningless buzzwords and showing off, with none of the show's trademark violence, and Itchy and Scratchy themselves are not in the cartoon nearly as much as Poochie. Unimpressed by Poochie, Homer's guests abruptly leave—even Marge, Bart, and Lisa.

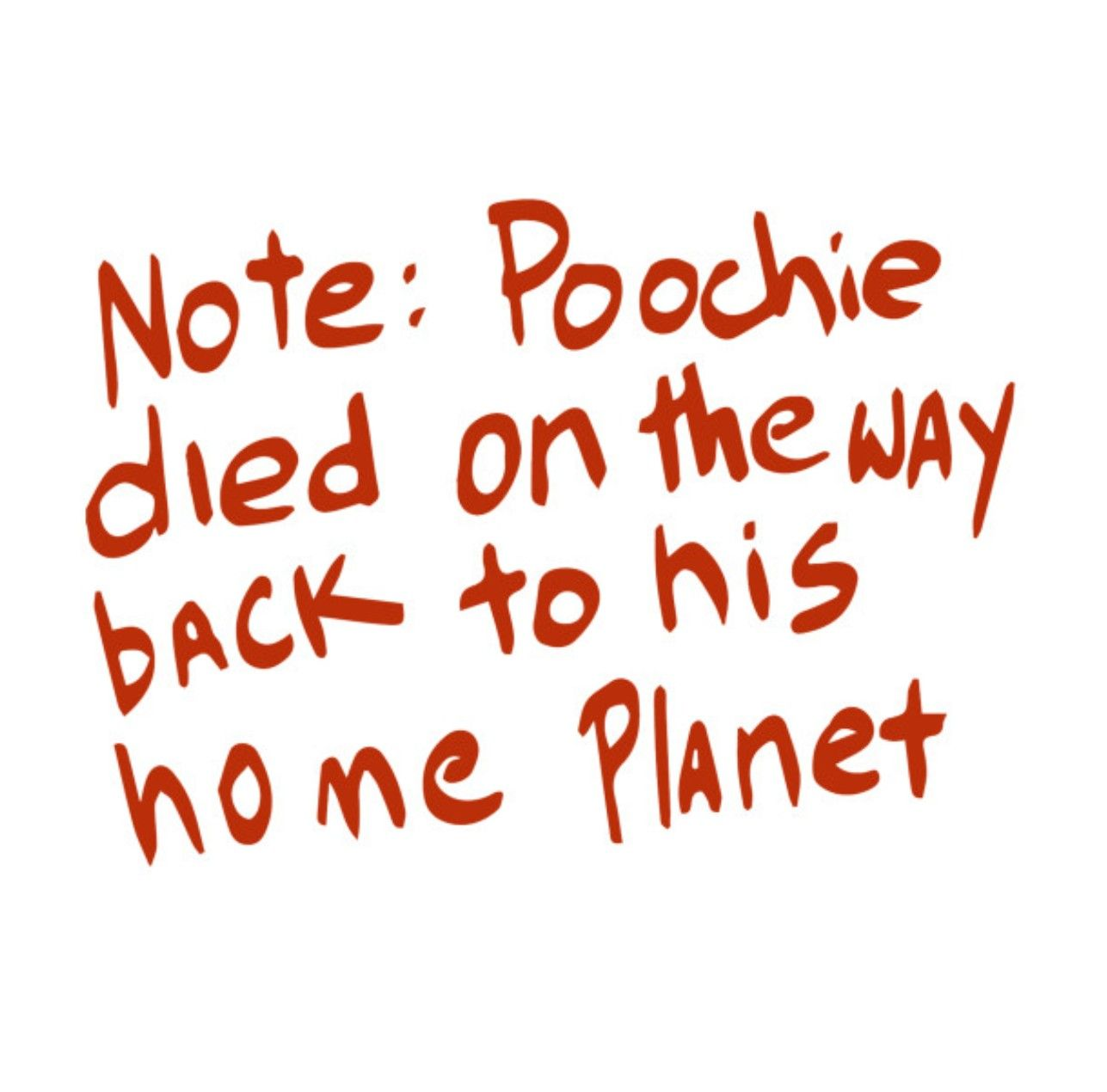
The intertitle revealing Poochie's demise.

Noticing how the new character only made things worse, Meyers decides to kill off Poochie, but Homer resolves to save him. In the next recording session, Homer goes off-script and implores the audience to give Poochie a chance. The show's production team appears moved by Homer's plea. However, when the episode airs, Meyers has dubbed over Homer's voice, Poochie gets clumsily removed from the short, and a handwritten intertitle explains, "Poochie died on the way back to his home planet." The studio audience cheers as Krusty displays an affidavit swearing Poochie will never return. Homer feels betrayed but attributes the affair to the fickle nature of show business. The network then runs classic Itchy & Scratchy episodes; Bart and Lisa laugh before deciding to watch something else.

== Production ==
"The Itchy & Scratchy & Poochie Show" was written by David X. Cohen and directed by Steven Dean Moore. The episode was conceived as a commentary on what it was like to work on a television show that had long been on the air, but was considered to be nearing its end. This was intended to show that The Simpsons could still be good after eight seasons, even though it no longer had the "shock value" it did in the early years. Before production of season eight began, several executives at Fox suggested the staff add a new character to the show, who would live with the Simpsons on a permanent basis, in a bid to freshen up the series. The writers found the suggestion, usually considered a sign of desperation to boost a flagging series, amusing, therefore much of the episode revolves around this trope. Parallel to the episode's main plot, where Poochie is introduced on The Itchy & Scratchy Show to boost its ratings, the writers inserted the one-time character Roy, a college-aged man who is shown to be living with the Simpsons, with no explanation as to his character or presence, as a reference to the executives' proposal. Roy was originally conceived for the "Time and Punishment" segment of the season six episode "Treehouse of Horror V", living with the Simpsons in one of the alternate realities, as a teenage son in the family.

Cohen's initial vision for Poochie was that he would be annoying to fans because he was wealthy, aloof and unlikeable. In the episode's DVD commentary he read his script for the first cartoon featuring Itchy, Scratchy, and Poochie:

Itchy and Scratchy are laborers in Poochie's gold mine. Poochie sits on a velvet throne surrounded by bags of money. He drinks champagne as he whips Itchy and Scratchy and lectures them on the value of hard work in a capitalist society. Finally, Itchy and Scratchy get fed up and plan their revenge. They decide Scratchy will present a fake money bag to Poochie. Itchy will secretly be hiding in the bag. When Poochie raises the bag to inhale the sweet smell of money, Itchy will jab him in the nose with a syringe of poison. Itchy gets in the bag and Scratchy presents it to Poochie, but the plan backfires because Poochie is offended by how small the money bag is. To demonstrate how worthless it is to him, he sets it on fire and uses it to light his cigar. Itchy's flaming skeleton falls out of the burning bag, and the syringe lands on Scratchy's toe and kills him, too. Poochie says, "Oh, well, I can always use my millions of dollars to hire more workers. That's the power of money." The end.

As with other episodes centering on the production of The Itchy & Scratchy Show, such as "The Front", the show's staff are shown. Almost all of them are based on the actual staff of The Simpsons. In the first scene at the production table the person in the lower right corner, wearing a squid T-shirt, is Cohen. On the left side, the furthest away is Bill Oakley with Josh Weinstein next to him. Next to Weinstein is George Meyer, who is the writer who speaks out and gets fired. The animator shown designing Poochie is supervising director David Silverman. As Silverman plays the tuba, one was drawn into the background of the scene. Other writers who appear include Dan McGrath, Ian Maxtone-Graham, Donick Cary, Ron Hauge, Ned Goldreyer, and Mike Scully, who had to be added in later, as the animators did not have a photo to use as a likeness.

This episode also features the first use of Comic Book Guy's catchphrase "Worst. Episode. Ever.", which was taken from the alt.tv.simpsons newsgroup.

== Themes ==
This episode saw The Simpsons surpass The Flintstones for the number of episodes produced for an animated series. The episode therefore deals with the issue of longevity and the problems that arise when the producers try to make a show "fresh" again. The show mainly deals with themes commonly known as "jumping the shark", instances that usually occur when a failing show adds a new character or major plot twist to boost ratings. The first theme is a commentary on adding a new character, when the show has run for too long. Usually, this is a technique used in shows that involve children who have grown up. This was the case with Oliver on The Brady Bunch and Luke Brower on Growing Pains. The technique is also used in cartoons, notably with the addition of Scrappy-Doo to the Scooby-Doo animated series ten years after its debut. Both Poochie and Roy are used to reflect this by attempting to keep The Itchy and Scratchy Show and the Simpson family fresh respectively.

Another theme is the notion of network executives forcing ideas onto a show. The interaction between the writers and the network executives in the episode underscore the differences between them. The writers understand the show's inner workings, but the network executives approach improvements to the show from a business point of view. They try to incorporate what they see as a rebellious character with the comment "This is popular with the kids", but the viewers later reject the character. The writers themselves are satirized in the episode, and are depicted as lazy and pretentious with few original ideas.

The last theme is the viewer backlash and obsession with internal consistency. When Comic Book Guy sees the Poochie episode, he immediately goes on the Internet and writes "Worst episode ever" on a message board; a commentary on how the active audience nit picks the episode. The writers respond by using the voice of Bart:

Bart: Hey, I know it wasn't great, but what right do you have to complain?
Comic Book Guy: As a loyal viewer, I feel they owe me.
Bart: What? They've given you thousands of hours of entertainment for free. What could they possibly owe you? I mean, if anything, you owe them!
Comic Book Guy: ...Worst episode ever.

Earlier in the episode, Homer and June Bellamy attend an in-store appearance as part of the promotion for the new character Poochie. They are asked a question of internal consistency, like the show's fans do all the time; Homer says to the fan who asks the question, "Why would a man whose shirt says 'Genius at Work' spend all his time watching a children's cartoon show?" This is again a reflection on how the writers feel about the fans obsessing about internal consistency.

== Cultural references ==
The original opening couch gag shows a pastiche of the cover collage from the Beatles' 1967 album Sgt. Pepper's Lonely Hearts Club Band, which was first used earlier in the season for "Bart After Dark". Otherwise, the episode refers to other TV shows, including the couch gag used in syndication that featured the Flintstone family, recycled from the season four episode "Kamp Krusty", to mark The Simpsons surpassing The Flintstones as the longest-running animated series.

Roy calls Homer and Marge Mr. and Mrs. S, which echoes Fonzie calling the Cunninghams "Mr. and Mrs. C" on Happy Days. Later, he decides to move in with "two sexy ladies", recalling Jack Tripper in Three's Company. Homer hiding in the closet to hear what the network executives were planning to do with Poochie is a reference to Jay Leno reportedly eavesdropping on a conversation between NBC executives on whether he or David Letterman would replace Johnny Carson as the host of The Tonight Show.

Itchy and Scratchy are based on Tom and Jerry and other cat-and-mouse cartoons. As a boy, series creator Matt Groening and his friends would fantasize about an ultra-violent cartoon and how much fun it would be to work on a show like that. June Bellamy is a tribute to voice actress June Foray. In the episode, Bellamy claims that she provided the "Beep, beep" sound effect in the Wile E. Coyote and Road Runner cartoons; in reality the phrase was voiced by Paul Julian.

== Reception ==
In its original American broadcast, "The Itchy & Scratchy & Poochie Show" finished tied for 38th place in the weekly ratings for the week of February 3–9, 1997, with a Nielsen rating of 8.8. It was the third-highest-rated show on the Fox Network that week. This episode was placed 23rd on Entertainment Weekly's top 25 The Simpsons episodes list.

Gary Russell and Gareth Roberts, the authors of the book I Can't Believe It's a Bigger and Better Updated Unofficial Simpsons Guide, praised "The Itchy & Scratchy & Poochie Show", calling it "a very neat episode which, like 'The Front', is a good parody of the cartooning business." In 2007, Vanity Fair named it the sixth-best episode in the show's history, describing it as "a classic satire of network influence, obsessed TV fans, and programs that survive long after the shark has been jumped, the episode is a meta-celebration, a tongue-in-cheek rebuttal to everyone who claimed that the quality of The Simpsons had declined over the years."

Todd Gilchrist called it a masterpiece, stating it "could easily be packaged and sold by [itself]". Planet Simpson author Chris Turner describes the episode as "the most contentious and direct counterattack The Simpsons ever unleashed on its fans" and "[harsh] satire of the working world of big-time TV production". Robert Canning of IGN said it was "laugh-out-loud funny" and describing the introduction of Roy as "a hilarious parody of a classic, overused television device." Alan Sepinwall, then of The Star-Ledger, in a review printed two days after the episode originally aired, praised the writers for not airing a "very special" episode to celebrate the milestone of overtaking The Flintstones. He noted "[the episode is] so self-aware it put the best in-jokes on St. Elsewhere to shame."

The BBC named it as one of the ten most memorable episodes of the show, noting, "the writers used the opportunity to pay tribute to the art of animation and rail against network interference in their show." In 2014, The Simpsons writers picked "The Beagle Has Landed" as one of their nine favorite "Itchy & Scratchy" episodes of all time. Time ranked the episode second in its list of 10 best Simpsons episodes selected by Simpsons experts five years later. Comic Book Guy's phrase "Worst. Episode. Ever" was named by The A.V. Club as a quote that could be used in everyday life, as well as being one of the most popular quotes from the show. In that same publication, Erik Adams wrote that the episode "portrays a contentious relationship, and it does so as honestly and entertainingly as The Simpsons might portray any given relationship between the residents of Springfield. It’s a landmark episode in every sense of the term, the type that human Poochie Roy can only hope he lucks into after he moves in with those two sexy ladies. (Note: Roy died on the way to the apartment he shared with two sexy ladies.)"

== Notes ==
1. In syndication, this is replaced with the couch gag from the season four episode "Kamp Krusty" which features The Flintstones, but the audio from the original couch gag remains.

== Bibliography ==
- Alberti, John, ed. (2003). Leaving Springfield: "The Simpsons" and the Possibility of Oppositional Culture. Wayne State University Press. ISBN 0-8143-2849-0.
- Groening, Matt (1997). Richmond, Ray; Coffman, Antonia (eds.). The Simpsons: A Complete Guide to Our Favorite Family (1st ed.). New York: HarperPerennial. ISBN 978-0-06-095252-5. LCCN 98141857. OCLC 37796735. OL 433519M.
- Turner, Chris (2004). Planet Simpson: How a Cartoon Masterpiece Documented an Era and Defined a Generation. Foreword by Douglas Coupland. (1st ed.). Toronto: Random House Canada. ISBN 978-0-679-31318-2. OCLC 55682258.
