= Homer the Smithers =

- The Simpsons episode
- Episode no.: Season 7 Episode 17
- Directed by: Steven Dean Moore
- Written by: John Swartzwelder
- Production code: 3F14
- Original air date: February 25, 1996

Episode features
- Couch gag: The Simpsons are wearing fezzes and drive to the couch in minicars.
- Commentary: Bill Oakley; Josh Weinstein; Steven Dean Moore

Episode chronology
← Previous "Lisa the Iconoclast"	Next → "The Day the Violence Died"
- The Simpsons season 7

"Homer the Smithers" is the seventeenth episode of the seventh season of the American animated television series The Simpsons. It originally aired on Fox in the United States on February 25, 1996. In the episode, Smithers takes a vacation and hires Homer to temporarily replace him as Mr. Burns' assistant, reasoning he will do such a poor job as to not risk Smithers being replaced, only for this to lead to Mr. Burns becoming so self-reliant that Smithers is fired on his return.

The episode was written by John Swartzwelder and directed by Steven Dean Moore. The plot came from another writer on the show, Mike Scully. The episode features cultural references to The Little Rascals, a series of comedy short films from the 1930s, and the 1971 film A Clockwork Orange.

Since airing, the episode has received mostly positive reviews from television critics. It acquired a Nielsen rating of 8.8, and was the fifth-highest-rated show on the Fox network the week it aired.

== Plot ==
As employee night at the Springfield drag races ends, Smithers fails to protect Mr. Burns from being harassed by a drunken Lenny (although he was only thanking him). Smithers tries to make amends the next day but again bungles his duties. When he attempts to drown himself in a water cooler, Burns demands he take a vacation once a suitable replacement can be found. Seeking a substitute who will not outshine him, Smithers selects Homer.

Homer is scolded for being unable to perform any of his duties to Burns' satisfaction. He is soon exhausted after waking up at 4:30 a.m. to prepare Burns' breakfast, assist him at the office all day, and cater to his every whim late at night in his mansion. After enduring Burns' constant abuse for several days, Homer loses his temper and knocks him unconscious with a punch. Fearing he has killed his boss, Homer flees to his house in panic. At Marge's urging, he returns to the plant to apologize, but a frightened Burns turns him away. Stranded in his office, Burns gradually learns how to complete all of his tasks single-handedly, and soon embraces his newfound self reliance. After thanking Homer for helping him acquire a more independent lifestyle, Burns fires a now-obsolete Smithers upon his return.

Unable to find another job, Smithers enlists Homer's help in a scheme to get his job back: he plans to save Burns from a phone call from his abusive 122-year-old mother, the one task he still cannot handle alone. Homer accidentally disconnects Burns' mother and tries to impersonate her voice. He is caught by Burns, who berates him and Smithers. A furious Smithers attacks Homer in Burns' office. During the tussle, Burns is accidentally pushed from a third-story window and seriously injured, forcing him to rely on Smithers completely again. In gratitude, Smithers sends Homer a fruit basket with a thank-you note.

== Production ==
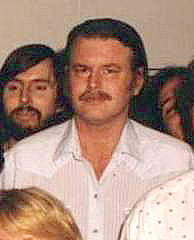
The episode was written by John Swartzwelder.

The episode was written by John Swartzwelder, who got the story from another member of the writing staff, Mike Scully. When the show runners of this season, Bill Oakley and Josh Weinstein, took over the job from David Mirkin, they wanted to "take the show back" to the Simpson family. Their goal was to have at least fifteen episodes per season that revolved around the family or a member of the family, but they still wanted to do the annual Halloween episode, a Sideshow Bob episode, an Itchy and Scratchy episode, and a "format bending" episode, which in this season was "22 Short Films About Springfield". They wanted the family episodes to be realistic, and Oakley thought "Homer the Smithers" was a good example. When Scully pitched the idea to the writers, Oakley was surprised that it had not been done earlier on the show. He thought the story sounded like something that would have been done by the third season because it was "simple" and "organic".

Weinstein said that this episode was an opportunity for him, Oakley, and Swartzwelder to "go nuts" with the "Burns-ism". He said that they enjoy writing for characters such as Burns and Abe Simpson because of their "out-datedness", and because they get to use thesauruses for looking up "old time slang". For example, Burns answers the phone by saying "Ahoy, hoy!", which was suggested by Alexander Graham Bell to be used as the proper telephone answer when the telephone was first invented. Burns' kitchen is full of "crazy old-time" devices and contraptions. For inspiration, Weinstein brought in "a bunch" of old books with designs of old kitchen devices. Oakley commented that the stuffed polar bear had always been in Burns' office, and they were excited to "finally" have a use for it.

Matt Groening has noted the challenges of sound mixing with this episode, the results of which influenced future episodes of the show and Groening's other series Futurama. When the animation for the episode returned, the production staff found the scene of Homer fighting Smithers "horrifying", as the sounds of character exertion made it seem too violent. After experimenting with the sound, they were eventually able to make the scene humorous by only leaving in sounds of the characters' agony.

== Cultural references ==
When Homer gets up early to make Mr. Burns breakfast, he wakes up Marge in bed. She says: "Homie, it's 4:30 in the morning. Little Rascals isn't on until 6", referencing The Little Rascals, a series of comedy short films from the 1930s. Smithers uses a Macintosh computer with the Mac OS operating system to search for his replacement. At the end of the episode, Burns is lying in bed in a body cast, chewing loudly and pausing his speech for Smithers to spoon-feed him, as in the film A Clockwork Orange when a bedridden Alex is spooned steak. The manner in which Burns becomes injured is also similar to Alex: they both take a potentially life-threatening fall.

== Reception ==
In its original broadcast, "Homer the Smithers" finished 60th in the ratings for the week of February 19 to February 25, 1996, with a Nielsen rating of 8.8. The episode was the fifth-highest-rated show on the Fox network that week, following The X-Files, Beverly Hills, 90210, Melrose Place, and Married... with Children.

Since airing, the episode has received mostly positive reviews from television critics.

Dave Foster of DVD Times said that "Homer the Smithers" shows "just how dependent upon Smithers Mr. Burns is". He added that the staging and animation of the scene in which Homer tries to apologize to Burns "will remain engraved in your memory in the same way as some of the series finest dialogue can".

DVD Movie Guide's Colin Jacobson enjoyed the episode and commented that "any doubts about Smithers' sexuality will not last long when we see his vacation". Jacobson would have liked to see more scenes from Smithers' vacation, but he still thought the episode offered "nice exposition" for the character. He added: "It’s fun to see more about his pampering of Burns, and it’s amusing to watch Homer take over for him."

Jennifer Malkowski of DVD Verdict considered the best part of the episode to be the scenes of Smithers on vacation. She concluded her review by giving the episode a grade of A−.

The authors of the book I Can't Believe It's a Bigger and Better Updated Unofficial Simpsons Guide, Gary Russell and Gareth Roberts, called it a "very good episode, and an unusually straightforward one for this surreal season".

Gwen Inhat writes "Balancing a heavy dose of hilarity with an equal amount of heart, 'Homer The Smithers' winds up being a perfect fit in sentimental season seven, with a momentarily ambitious Homer and the fitting reunion of one of The Simpsons’ most enduring duos."
