= Alt.tv.simpsons =

Usenet newsgroup

alt.tv.simpsons
- The fruit of the discussion on alt.tv.simpsons is compiled and submitted to The Simpsons Archive.
- Website type: Television
- Website: simpsonsarchive.com
- Launched: March 1990
- Current status: Active

alt.tv.simpsons (called "a.t.s." by regular readers) is a usenet newsgroup dedicated to discussing the American television program The Simpsons. Created in 1990, the newsgroup became a popular community in the early 1990s. It is known for reviewing episodes and nitpicking minor details on the show.

The writers of The Simpsons knew about the forum and have on several occasions read the comments made on it. The character Comic Book Guy is often used in the show to lampoon and respond to the newsgroup's fans. In interviews some writers have admitted that they do not like being scrutinized, but other writers participated in the discussions on the forum. Independent commentators called the forum an example of an "active audience" and have claimed The Simpsons is tailor-made for such a forum.

== History ==
The newsgroup was created by Gary D. Duzan during the third week of March 1990, four months after the first airing of a regular episode of the program, which was the episode "Simpsons Roasting on an Open Fire" – a Christmas special that aired on December 17, 1989. At the time Duzan was in his third year, studying computer science, at the University of Delaware.

The newsgroup was created before there was a World Wide Web, which emerged in 1993, so those earliest discussions were held on text-only platforms. According to Chris Turner, a Canadian journalist and writer of the book Planet Simpson, the newsgroup was among the most trafficked newsgroups of the early 1990s. In that period it became a popular community on the Internet. According to Brian Reid, a computer scientist who has been tracking newsgroup traffic since 1985, alt.tv.simpsons was the most popular television newsgroup in May 1994, ahead of a discussion newsgroups about general television (rec.arts.tv), Monty Python (alt.fan.monty-python), the Late Show with David Letterman (alt.fan.letterman) and soap operas (rec.arts.tv.soaps). Since there is no official method for measuring newsgroup traffic, the list is considered unofficial.

== Discussions ==
From its inception, users used the newsgroup to discuss the quality of the episode, as well as to talk about continuity errors and trivia. They also discussed cultural references, usually related to pop culture. Another common topic was freeze frame gags, which are jokes that can only be seen when the viewer tapes the episode and freezes the image. All of these many discussions were compiled and submitted to The Simpsons Archive, which contains at least 330 episode guides as well as other guides. The newsgroup also provided The Simpsons Archive with information on the characters and the setting, as well as a compilation of articles about the show and interview with its cast and crew.

Among the most frequent topics of discussion were the real-life location of Springfield, the sexuality of Waylon Smithers, and "Who Shot Mr. Burns?", a two-episode publicity stunt in which Mr. Burns was shot by an unknown character. The writers inserted many secret clues into the episode and implemented a contest in which whoever first discovered the shooter would be animated on an episode of the show. Although the alt.tv.simpsons community debated this mystery to an extreme degree, no one officially guessed the right answer, and therefore no one was ever animated on the show. Due to contest regulations, a winner had to be selected out of a random sample of entries. The sample did not contain any correct answers, so the winner who was chosen did not have the right answer and was paid a cash prize in lieu of being animated.

== Relationship with the writers ==
The writers often use the character Comic Book Guy to satirize and respond to the alt.tv.simpsons community. In this scene he is logging on to alt.nerd.obsessive, a parody of alt.tv.simpsons.

The writers of the show were aware of the newsgroup and sometimes make jokes at its expense. Within the series, the character Comic Book Guy is often used to represent a stereotypical inhabitant of alt.tv.simpsons. The first such instance occurred in the seventh-season episode "Radioactive Man," in which Comic Book Guy is logging on to his favorite newsgroup alt.nerd.obsessive. Comic Book Guy's oft-repeated catchphrase, "Worst episode ever," first appeared on alt.tv.simpsons in an episode review and David S. Cohen decided to use this fan response to lampoon the passion and the fickleness of the fans.

The eighth season episode "The Itchy & Scratchy & Poochie Show" is largely seen as a satire of the "hardcore fans" that make up the newsgroup, as well as a response to the viewer backlash and obsession with internal consistency those fans commonly expressed. When Comic Book Guy sees the Poochie episode, he immediately goes on the Internet and writes, “Worst episode ever” on a message board; a commentary on how the active audience nitpicks the episode. The writers respond by using the voice of Bart Simpson:

Comic Book Guy: Last night's Itchy & Scratchy was, without a doubt, the worst episode ever. Rest assured I was on the Internet within minutes registering my disgust throughout the world.
Bart: Hey, I know it wasn’t great, but what right do you have to complain?
Comic Book Guy: As a loyal viewer, I feel they owe me.
Bart: What? They’re giving you thousands of hours of entertainment for free. What could they possibly owe you? If anything, you owe them.
Comic Book Guy: [pause] Worst..episode..ever.

— David S. Cohen, "The Itchy & Scratchy & Poochie Show", The Simpsons

The catchphrase further appears in the eleventh season episode "Saddlesore Galactica," and as the title of the twelfth season episode "Worst Episode Ever." The catchphrase can also be used for describing other things by saying, "Worst. (Noun). Ever."

The writers also used the newsgroup to test how observant the fans are. In the seventh-season episode "Treehouse of Horror VI", the writer of segment Homer^{3}, David S. Cohen, deliberately inserted a false equation into the background of one scene. The equation that appears is 1782^{12} + 1841^{12} = 1922^{12}. Although a false statement, it appears to be true when evaluated on a typical calculator with 10 digits of precision. If it were true, it would disprove Fermat's Last Theorem, which had just been proven when this episode first aired. Cohen generated this "Fermat near-miss" with a computer program. After the episode aired, Cohen lurked on the newsgroup to see the response; at first there was astonishment when users tested it, but later there was despair when they found out it was only accurate to eight decimal places when expressed in scientific notation.

== Reception ==
The comments of alt.tv.simpsons have been quoted or cited in the writings of mass media commentators. This has led to situations in which relations between writers and viewers have become strained. In 1994, Simpsons creator Matt Groening acknowledged he and the other show runners have been reading the newsgroup and in frustration said, "Sometimes I feel like knocking their electronic noggins together". In another case, writer Ian Maxtone-Graham made comments about the fans on the Internet in an interview with The Independent, calling them "beetle-browed" and saying, "That's why they're on the Internet and we're writing the show." Writer Bill Oakley used to respond to select Simpsons fans through e-mail in a friendly manner, but by 1996 claimed "[t]here are people who take it seriously to the point of absurdity". In a 1994 Life in Hell cartoon, Matt Groening implied that he read the newsgroup.

In the chapter "Who Wants Candy" in the 2004 book Leaving Springfield, Robert Sloane finds alt.tv.simpsons an example of an "active audience ... who struggle to make their own meaning out of the show". He mentions that in this context, the fans nitpick the show to an extreme and allow no room for error, where the writers believe that nitpicking leads to an under appreciation of the show's qualities. Chris Turner writes in the 2004 book Planet Simpson that The Simpsons appeared tailor-made for a newsgroup in the early 1990s because it includes minor details that reward attentive viewing and can be easily scrutinized.
