= The Simpsons Archive =

Fan website for The Simpsons

alt.tv.simpsons

- The Simpsons Archive main page
- Website type: Television
- Website: simpsonsarchive.com
- Launched: 1994
- Current status: Online

The Simpsons Archive, also known by its previous domain name snpp.com or simply SNPP (named for the Springfield Nuclear Power Plant), is a Simpsons fan site that has been online since 1994. Maintained by dozens of volunteers from—amongst other places—the newsgroup alt.tv.simpsons and Simpsons-related forums, the site features information on every aspect of the show, from detailed guides to upcoming episodes and merchandise, to the episode capsules (text files documenting freeze frame jokes, quotes, scene summaries, reviews and the like), for which the site is well known. In a bid to steer clear of Fox's legal department after a conflict in 1996, the site contains no multimedia or interactive features, preferring to focus on documenting the show through textual material. As of October 2005, the site receives roughly 1.2 million hits per month. In December 2013, it was moved to simpsonsarchive.com, with the original snpp.com domain returned to the owner that had provided it to the project at no cost since 1995.

The Archive began in 1994, the brainchild of Gary Goldberg, with extensive help from the members of alt.tv.simpsons at the time, including Raymond Chen, the first to compile the episode capsules, and Dave Hall, one of the first online Simpsons fans to champion list-compiling. The site, originally based on the Widener archive set up by Brendan Kehoe in 1989, featured a bright yellow and black design until 1998, when it was revamped to the more subdued style.

== Site contents ==
FAQs, Guides and Lists
FAQs, character files, merchandise information, broadcast history and, as the name would suggest, various lists (such as the cast list, couch gags, blackboard gags, song lyrics etc.)
Upcoming Episodes
Guides to upcoming national schedules in the countries of (including, but not limited to) USA, UK, Australia, New Zealand, Russia, as well as details on episodes in production.
Episode Guide
Brief episode synopsis for each episode, including guest stars and first character appearances.
Episode Capsules
Probably the site's most well-known feature: comprehensive text files documenting quotes and scene summaries, freeze-frame jokes, reviews, animation errors and any other insight necessary. The capsules are mostly compiled from documentation posted to alt.tv.simpsons. The episode capsule is a convention that has since crossed over to many other TV show fansites and newsgroups, including co-Matt Groening animation Futurama. Episodes featured are up to and including thirteenth season's "The Bart Wants What It Wants".
Miscellaneous
A collection of both internal and external copies of academic papers, articles, interviews and the like relating to the show, dating back as far as 1987.
Simpsons-L
The site's own e-mail-based discussion group, having over 1000 members. This list was moderated to prevent spam. The mailing list was shut down in 2010.
Web links
A comprehensive list of links to hundreds of other related sites, from fansites and character sites to the homepages of the cast and official sites.
The Springfield Times
A news page, home to articles on new Simpsons-related information, events and products, as well as to the two sub-sections of DVD News and Movie News.

In addition to this, the site offers a search facility and an About the Archive page which allows you to contact any of the various maintainers and check which new pages and episode capsules have been added since your last visit.

== Publicity ==
The site has been featured in many publications, including the UK magazine WebUser, in which the site ranked #3 in their list of the "Top 100 TV Websites" back in 2002, and several unofficial Simpsons books including the analytical Planet Simpson by Chris Turner and the UK-issued episode guides The Pocket Essentials: The Simpsons by Peter Mann and I Can't Believe It's A Bigger, Better Updated Unofficial Simpsons Guide by Gary Russell and Gareth Roberts. In Planet Simpson, Turner thanks the Simpsons Archive, saying that the book would have been impossible without it.

Matt Groening, creator of the show, was once quoted in the Argentinian newspaper La Nación as saying: "Sometimes we have to look at fan sites to remember [what we have done before]: one of the best is www.snpp.com. I have no idea what those initials mean, but it has a lot of stuff. Though for them, every episode is the worst ever." Reviews from the site's episode capsules have also been mentioned in the DVD commentaries by various members of the show's staff.

In 2007, it was ranked number five on Entertainment Weekly's list of "25 essential fansites".
