= The Itchy & Scratchy Show =

Fictional animated series on The Simpsons

Itchy and Scratchy
- The Simpsons characters
- Title card for The Itchy & Scratchy Show featuring Itchy (left) and Scratchy (right)
- First appearance: The Bart Simpson Show (November 20, 1988; 37 years ago)
- Created by: Matt Groening; James L. Brooks; Sam Simon
- Voiced by: Itchy: Dan Castellaneta; Scratchy: Harry Shearer

In-universe information
- Species: Itchy: House mouse Scratchy: Tuxedo cat

The Itchy & Scratchy Show (often shortened as Itchy & Scratchy) is a fictional animated series featured on The Simpsons. The cartoon depicts an anthropomorphic sadistic house mouse named Itchy who repeatedly maims or murders an anthropomorphic black cat named Scratchy. It is typically presented as 15- to 60-second sketches that are a part of The Krusty the Clown Show that almost invariably prompts laughter from Bart and Lisa.

The Itchy and Scratchy characters are adult-oriented, extremely violent, bloody, gory, and gruesome parodies of cat-and-mouse cartoons such as Tom and Jerry, Herman and Katnip, and Pixie and Dixie and Mr. Jinks. The Italian comic strip Squeak the Mouse, itself a parody of Tom and Jerry, is also considered to be a strong inspiration and influence for the characters.

The cartoon first appeared in The Tracey Ullman Show short "The Bart Simpson Show", which aired in 1988. The cartoon's first appearance in The Simpsons was in the 1990 episode "There's No Disgrace Like Home". The cartoons became popular among the show's writers and animators, and they are often added when an episode needs expanding. Several full episodes were centered on the fictional production of Itchy & Scratchy, such as "Itchy & Scratchy & Marge".

== Role in The Simpsons ==
The Itchy & Scratchy Show is a show within a show that appears occasionally in episodes of The Simpsons. They appear in the form of 15- to 60-second-long cartoons that are filled with graphic violence, almost always initiated by Itchy the mouse against Scratchy the cat, with the former almost always being the victor. Itchy & Scratchy airs as a segment on The Krusty the Clown Show, and also aired on its brief replacements, The Side-Show Bob Cavalcade of Whimsy and Gabbo. Itchy & Scratchy mostly airs as a standalone show rather than being a segment in some episodes, such as "In Marge We Trust" (season 8, 1997).

Itchy & Scratchy is usually a parody of traditional cartoons or takeoffs on famous films, but the plot and content are always violent and bloody, with Itchy performing unprovoked acts of graphic violence and homicide unlike most classic cartoons. The most direct and obvious example is Tom and Jerry, an animated series which was also about a constant battle between a cat and a mouse, with the mouse usually victorious, though in Itchy & Scratchy, the mouse acts as the antagonist. Itchy & Scratchy also includes shorts such as Scratchtasia, a parody of Fantasia, and Pinitchio, a parody of Pinocchio. Animation-related jokes are prevalent in the show, such as the Manhattan Madness cartoon in "The Day the Violence Died", which is based on very early animated cartoons such as Gertie the Dinosaur. The cartoons also occasionally serve to play out an exaggerated form of the conflict in the surrounding episode. For example, in "Deep Space Homer" (season five, 1994), Homer is recruited by NASA, and later watches an Itchy & Scratchy cartoon which directly (and gruesomely) parodies the films 2001: A Space Odyssey and Alien.

=== Fictional production history ===
Several full episodes of The Simpsons were centered on the fictional production history of The Itchy & Scratchy Show. It begins with Chester J. Lampwick creating Itchy the mouse for the now-lost silent cartoon Manhattan Madness, in which Itchy brutally attacks and kills an Irishman and Theodore Roosevelt, in 1919 (the year of the first Felix the Cat cartoon). However, the character was later stolen by Roger Meyers. Scratchy starred in his first cartoon in 1928 titled That Happy Cat. The film, a 13-second-long animation showing the cat whistling and tipping his hat, was a commercial failure. Later that year, Itchy and Scratchy starred in their first cartoon together called Steamboat Itchy, a violent parody of Disney's Steamboat Willie. Along with the cartoon shorts, Itchy and Scratchy were featured in a World War II–era radio series, at least two films (Pinitchio and Scratchtasia, which are parodies of Pinocchio and Fantasia, respectively), and television commercials for Laramie Cigarettes.

Itchy & Scratchy Studios is run by Roger Meyers Jr., the son of Roger Meyers, the cartoon's supposed creator. The studio was bankrupted after it was sued by Lampwick for $800 million when he was represented by Lionel Hutz, but was saved after receiving a large cash settlement from the government over its use of Mr. ZIP. The show underwent a brief, non-violent retooling following a protest campaign led by Marge Simpson, but it returned to its original violent format after Marge was later discredited after defending the display of Michelangelo's David in Springfield in the face of public objection. Itchy & Scratchy has spawned an in-universe Academy Award–winning film adaptation, amusement parks, and a musical; and, like Krusty's show, localized versions are produced for other countries, such as Jamaica's The Itchem and Scratchem Blow.

== Characters ==
=== Featured in Itchy & Scratchy ===
- Itchy (voiced by Dan Castellaneta) is a blue mouse and the show's villainous antagonist; he almost always succeeds in his relentless attempts in mutilating or killing Scratchy and any other cats around. Itchy is rarely given any motivation for these attacks outside of the thrill of killing, often laughing in an evil fashion while murdering other characters.
- Scratchy (voiced by Harry Shearer), the protagonist, is a threadbare, dim-witted black cat and the perpetual victim of Itchy's violent acts; as opposed to Tom of Tom and Jerry, Scratchy seldom antagonizes the mouse to provoke him in any way and is almost always an ordinary civilian going about an everyday life until Itchy kills him.
- Poochie (voiced by Dan Castellaneta when voiced by Homer Simpson, Alex Rocco when voiced by Roger Meyers Jr.), is an orange dog that appeared in "The Itchy & Scratchy & Poochie Show" (season eight, 1997). In the episode, the producers of The Itchy & Scratchy Show believed the cartoons were getting stale, and needed a new character to reinvigorate the show. Homer Simpson gets the job of voicing Poochie, who is introduced in the cartoon, "The Beagle Has Landed". A product of marketing department thinking, Poochie was near-universally despised due to interfering with the graphic violence, and was permanently killed off in his second appearance, despite Homer's objections. The episode was both a reference to TV shows which added new characters purportedly to reinvigorate the show, and a commentary on the growing complaints of fans of The Simpsons. The original idea for the episode was that Poochie would be obnoxious because he was so rich, rather than because he was so cool. Poochie would later make brief speaking cameo appearances in "Treehouse of Horror IX", "Little Big Mom", and "The Nightmare After Krustmas".

=== Production staff ===
- Roger Meyers Jr. (voiced by Alex Rocco in 1990, 1996–1997, Hank Azaria in 1993–1994) is the Chairman of the Board of Itchy & Scratchy Studios and son of Roger Meyers. He first appeared in "Itchy & Scratchy & Marge" (season two, 1990). He distributes the cartoon and is a jaded and selfish businessman who has nothing but contempt for his audience. He has an extremely callous personality; he only cares about people who can help him. This is displayed in his contempt for the writers of The Itchy & Scratchy Show. Alex Rocco also voiced Meyers in "The Day the Violence Died" and "The Itchy & Scratchy & Poochie Show". He said that he liked voicing Meyers because "I get to be a big-shot." He professed being nervous when voicing the character for the first time in "Itchy & Scratchy & Marge" because he said that he had never done a voice-over before. At first he tried doing a special voice, but was told to "just be yourself." Rocco was one of Bill Oakley's and Josh Weinstein's favorite guest stars, and they liked including him in their episodes so they could "have a little fun with him." On occasions when Rocco was unavailable to do a voice over, Meyers was voiced by Hank Azaria in "The Front" (season four, 1993), "Lady Bouvier's Lover" (season five, 1994) and "Itchy & Scratchy Land" (season six, 1994). The spelling of Meyers' name has been inconsistent in the show. His last name was spelled both Myers and Meyers in "Itchy & Scratchy & Marge", and Myers the later episode "The Day the Violence Died". His name is spelled Meyers in "The Front", as well as in the book The Simpsons: A Complete Guide to Our Favorite Family.
- Roger Meyers Sr. first appeared in video footage in "Itchy & Scratchy Land" and has never had a speaking role. He was created because the writers felt it would have been "tortured logic" to have the Roger Meyers Jr. be the creator. Roger Meyers Sr. has similarities to Walt Disney. For example, Disney's alleged antisemitism is spoofed when it is revealed that Meyers made a cartoon called Nazi Supermen are Our Superiors.
- June Bellamy (voiced by Tress MacNeille in her normal voice, Dan Castellaneta in her Itchy voice, Harry Shearer in her Scratchy voice, Julie Kavner in her Disapproving Squirrel voice) is the actress who portrays both Itchy and Scratchy. Her only appearance was in "The Itchy & Scratchy & Poochie Show". She is presumably a reference to veteran voice actress June Foray, who also voiced several male characters, notably Rocky the Flying Squirrel. In actuality, Itchy and Scratchy are voiced by two different men rather than one woman.
- Chester J. Lampwick (voiced by Kirk Douglas) is the creator of Itchy and only appeared in "The Day the Violence Died". The producers' first choice for the character, William Hickey, declined. Douglas's recording session was fraught with interruptions because he refused to wear the supplied earphones and said the maximum he would do was two takes.
- In several episodes revolving around the production of Itchy & Scratchy, caricatures of The Simpsons' staff are used as the writing staff of Itchy & Scratchy. This first occurred in "Itchy & Scratchy & Marge" where caricatures of animators David Silverman, Wes Archer, and Rich Moore can be seen. In "The Front" many of the show's writers were used, this in-joke was purely an idea of the animators. John Swartzwelder, George Meyer, Jeff Martin, Al Jean, Sam Simon, Jon Vitti, and Mike Reiss all appeared in the episode. This joke returned in "The Itchy & Scratchy & Poochie Show". Almost all of the writers shown are caricatures of the actual staff of The Simpsons. At the production table, David X. Cohen, Bill Oakley, and Josh Weinstein are shown, while Meyer speaks out and gets fired. The animator shown designing Poochie is Silverman. Others who appear include Dan McGrath, Ian Maxtone-Graham, Donick Cary, Ron Hauge, Ned Goldreyer, and Mike Scully.

== Background ==
=== Origins ===
Itchy and Scratchy in their first appearance in "The Bart Simpson Show"

The Itchy & Scratchy Show first appeared in The Tracey Ullman Show short "The Bart Simpson Show", which originally aired on November 20, 1988. They were the first major recurring characters outside of the Simpson family to appear. As a child, series creator Matt Groening and his friends would fantasize about an ultra-violent cartoon and how much fun it would be to work on a show like that. The names "Itchy" and "Scratchy" were inspired by Pixie and Dixie, which was a segment on the cartoon show The Huckleberry Hound Show. The comic strip Squeak the Mouse is also considered an apparent inspiration for the characters. As a child, Groening really liked the 1961 Disney film One Hundred and One Dalmatians, and it was one of the reasons to why he got into cartooning. In the film, the puppies watch television, and the idea of having a cartoon within a cartoon thrilled Groening. From that idea he got the inspiration for Itchy & Scratchy.

David Silverman states that Itchy and Scratchy cartoons are "an ironic commentary on cartoon mayhem in the sense that it's taken to a more realistic level. The kids on The Simpsons are laughing at it, and we're laughing too, but part of what you're laughing at is the over-the-top excessiveness of the violence."

The Simpsons writer/producer Mike Reiss insists that The Itchy & Scratchy Show is based on Herman and Katnip, which he calls a "cheap, ultra-violent knockoff" of Tom and Jerry. Silverman supports this, stating Herman and Katnip "is hilarious because it's just bad".

=== Development ===
"Over the years, we have gotten fan mail from people asking for Itchy & Scratchy to get their own spinoff, and you know, more Itchy & Scratchy, so we put together a montage of Itchy & Scratchy moments, that is several minutes long, and I've shown it to audiences and they get stunned after a minute and a half."

— Matt Groening

The Itchy and Scratchy show first appeared in The Tracey Ullman Show short "The Bart Simpson Show", which aired on November 20, 1988; the performance style at the time was like Tom and Jerry and, unusually, featured Scratchy much like his Tom and Jerry counterpart, attacking Itchy. Their first appearance in The Simpsons was "There's No Disgrace Like Home". In the series, it was quickly established early on that Scratchy was a peaceful character that was persecuted by his friend, the Psychopathic mouse, Itchy.

Itchy & Scratchy cartoons are often added when a show needs expanding or when there is an issue that the writers wish to satirize. In some cases, notably in "The Itchy & Scratchy & Poochie Show", the writers use Itchy & Scratchy as a way to comment on The Simpsons. The shorts are often difficult for the writers, and take much time to develop and devise a title, and in the end they fill little time. Writing the Itchy & Scratchy cartoons is quite often a group effort, with it being pitched out one gag after another. Itchy & Scratchy are a favorite of John Swartzwelder, who has written many of the episodes that center on them and quite often pitches the ideas for the shorts. In the early seasons, fans wanted more Itchy & Scratchy, so the writers decided to do "Itchy & Scratchy & Marge", an episode that dealt with censorship issues which would allow them to show several cartoons. Swartzwelder and Sam Simon collaborated to create the "nice" version of Itchy and Scratchy in that episode. The cartoons are often kept short, because according to David Silverman, "it doesn't really work as a long cartoon."

During David Mirkin's tenure as showrunner (season five and six), he was asked by the Fox network not to do any more Itchy & Scratchy cartoons due to the amount of violence in them. In response, the show produced "Itchy & Scratchy Land". The network asked them not to do the episode, and threatened that if the episode was produced, they would cut the Itchy & Scratchy parts out themselves, but relented when Mirkin threatened to tell the media. The writers nevertheless promised to try not to overdo the violence and in some scenes the violence was cut.

During their tenure as executive producers, Bill Oakley and Josh Weinstein tried to fit in one episode relating to Itchy & Scratchy every season. They note that as the seasons progressed, it became increasingly difficult for them to create new Itchy & Scratchy episode ideas. Although the episode was difficult to animate, "Itchy & Scratchy Land" was "a dream come true" for the animators, as they enjoyed animating scenes filled with violence.

== Other appearances ==
Itchy and Scratchy have appeared in various products and other media relating to The Simpsons.

The Itchy & Scratchy Game was released for Game Gear and Super NES. A version for the Sega Genesis was also developed but was never commercially released. Itchy & Scratchy in Miniature Golf Madness, was released for Game Boy. Itchy, Scratchy and Poochie play roles in the "Grand Theft Scratchy" section in The Simpsons Game.

Itchy and Scratchy have also appeared in commercials for various products, including a 1999 Butterfinger advert where Bart watches a short called "500 Easy Pieces".

They appear in the first scene of The Simpsons Movie. The writers of the film knew from the beginning that they were going to start with an Itchy & Scratchy short and the segment was the first scene that was storyboarded by the animators.

The duo also appear in the pre-show video for The Simpsons Ride. They host a video called "Safety First" that shows riders what can happen to them if they do not follow ride requirements.

Outside of The Simpsons, Itchy & Scratchy also appear in one of the last scenes of Ghost Dog: The Way of the Samurai.

Itchy and Scratchy appear as cosmetic items in Fortnite, starting with Battle Royale's Chapter 6 Mini Season 2; a season that is entirely Simpsons-themed. Scratchy is a wearable outfit, while Itchy appears as a "Sidekick", the game's new version of the former pet items.

== Reception ==
=== Critical response ===
In his 2004 book Planet Simpson, author Chris Turner describes Itchy & Scratchy as "by far the most gleeful visual riffing on The Simpsons [...] each snippet of "Itchy & Scratchy" packs as much frenetically paced action, sight-gaggery, and physical humor into its half-minute of screen time as a half-dozen Road Runner cartoons and a dozen Tom & Jerrys."

In 2007, Vanity Fair named "The Itchy & Scratchy & Poochie Show" the sixth-best episode in the show's history, describing it as "a classic satire of network influence, obsessed TV fans, and programs that survive long after the shark has been jumped, the episode is a meta-celebration, a tongue-in-cheek rebuttal to everyone who claimed that the quality of The Simpsons had declined over the years."

Todd Gilchrist of IGN called Itchy & Scratchy a masterpiece, stating it "could easily be packaged and sold by [itself]." Robert Canning of IGN wrote that "it's always fun to see an 'Itchy and Scratchy' cartoon" but believes that the shorter and simpler cartoons are better than the longer more complex ones.

=== Popularity ===
In 2003, Entertainment Weekly named "Itchy & Scratchy Land" and "The Itchy & Scratchy & Poochie Show" the seventh-best and 23rd-best episodes of The Simpsons, respectively.

In a 2006 article, IGN ranked Itchy & Scratchy in tenth position on their list of the "Top 25 Simpsons Peripheral Characters", citing that "the Itchy & Scratchy Show shines a nice mirror on cartoons, showing just how funny cartoon violence really is."

In a 2014 Vulture article, The Simpsons writers ranked their nine favorite Itchy & Scratchy cartoons. Their choices included season 4's "Steamboat Itchy", season 14's "Bleeder of the Pack", the opening scene of The Simpsons Movie and the safety video "Safety First" that plays before The Simpsons Ride at Universal Studios.

A proposed spinoff TV series was planned in the 1990s, but did not move beyond an initial screening, as test audiences found the repetition of violence too excessive. Matt Groening affirmed that, while the gimmick of Itchy & Scratchy worked in short scenes, it would not have been as funny for an entire show.
