= Itchy & Scratchy Land =

- The Simpsons episode
- Episode no.: Season 6 Episode 4
- Directed by: Wes Archer
- Written by: John Swartzwelder
- Production code: 2F01
- Original air date: October 2, 1994

Episode features
- Chalkboard gag: "I am not the reincarnation of Sammy Davis Jr."
- Couch gag: The family is beamed onto the couch the same way the characters are in the original Star Trek series.
- Commentary: Matt Groening; David Mirkin; Dan Castellaneta; Yeardley Smith; Wes Archer

Episode chronology
← Previous "Another Simpsons Clip Show"	Next → "Sideshow Bob Roberts"
- The Simpsons season 6

"Itchy & Scratchy Land" is the fourth episode of the sixth season of the American animated television series The Simpsons. It first aired on Fox in the United States on October 2, 1994 and first aired in the UK on Sky One on October 16 1994. Wanting a perfect family vacation, the Simpson family visits Itchy & Scratchy Land, where the animatronics turn against the guests.

The episode was written by John Swartzwelder and directed by Wes Archer.

== Plot ==
Bart and Lisa want to visit Itchy & Scratchy Land, an amusement park, but Marge has already planned a family vacation to a bird sanctuary. Bart and Lisa persuade their parents to visit the theme park by revealing it has areas for adults, including bars, bowling alleys and a rehab center.

Marge dislikes Itchy & Scratchy Land's violent themes and attractions, but the family's trip goes well until Homer and Bart start assaulting the park's mascot performers, with Bart launching a stink bomb into one's Itchy suit, and Homer kicking another in the rear. Both are arrested by park security and locked in a detention cell. Marge lectures Bart and Homer after they are released from custody.

Despite a park employee assuring the Simpsons the Itchy and Scratchy robots are programmed to only attack each other, they go rogue and start attacking humans. A worker refuses to allow the Simpsons to evacuate aboard a helicopter because of Bart and Homer's misdeeds. The power supply is cut, plunging the park into darkness.

A horde of Itchy and Scratchy robots advances on the Simpsons. While frantically throwing things to repel them, Homer discovers a camera flash short-circuits the robots' systems and immobilizes them. The Simpsons grab dozens of cameras from a gift shop and defeat the entire Itchy & Scratchy army. Employees thank the Simpsons for saving the park. Despite their ordeal, they agree this was their best vacation ever, but Marge insists that none of them ever mention it again.

== Production ==
"Itchy & Scratchy Land", written by the entire writing team but credited to John Swartzwelder, was a very difficult episode to produce. It involved creating an entirely new environment, which meant large amounts of writing and all new sets. At the time that the episode was produced, new, more stringent censorship laws had been put in place. As a result, the Fox network tried to stop the writers from including Itchy & Scratchy cartoons in episodes. In response, the writers created this episode, which they decided would be as violent as possible. The network threatened that if the episode was produced, they would cut the Itchy & Scratchy parts out themselves, but relented when showrunner David Mirkin threatened to tell the media. The writers nevertheless promised to try not to overdo the violence.

Although the episode was quite difficult to animate, "Itchy & Scratchy Land" was "a dream come true" for the animators, as they enjoyed animating scenes filled with violence.

== Cultural references ==
The opening "Itchy & Scratchy" cartoon is "Last Traction Hero", a reference to Last Action Hero (1993) and features the "Anvil Chorus" from Verdi's Il Trovatore. Marge's memory of a visit to Amish country recalls Peter Weir's Witness (1985) and her memory of Homer and Bart scaring swimmers with shark fins recalls Jaws. The helicopter ride, the logo on the helicopter's side, and certain story elements parody Michael Crichton's Jurassic Park and Steven Spielberg's film adaptation. Other elements, such as the park's claim to be the "theme park of the future" "where nothing can possibly go wrong" and the robots rebelling, are based on Crichton's Westworld (1973). Homer and Marge visit a '70s-themed restaurant; Marge notes "The waiter looks like John Travolta!" and the waiter says "Yeah, looks like"; Travolta's career was moribund when the episode was written, but approximately a week and half after the episode aired, Travolta's career was revitalized by the release of Pulp Fiction. The sound made by the vehicle that takes Bart to the detention facility resembles the one made by the ground shuttles carrying the fighter pilots inside the Rebel Base in Star Wars (1977). The robots' vision is a reference to The Terminator (1984), while using flash-photography to destroy the robots is similar to one of the weaknesses in Gremlins (1984), in particular a scene where Phoebe Cates' character uses a Polaroid to fend off Gremlins. The birds attacking at the bird sanctuary is a spoof of Alfred Hitchcock's The Birds (1963); the birds flying into the phone booth is a parody of a scene from the film, with Hans Moleman standing in for Tippi Hedren.

Much of Itchy & Scratchy Land parodies Disneyland. The park's slogan "The Violentest Place on Earth" is a riff on Disneyland's slogan "The Happiest Place on Earth". The Itchy and Scratchy Money parodies the now defunct Disney Dollars scrip system. Scratchtasia is a parody of the Sorcerer's Apprentice segment of Fantasia (1940), with several shots and the music parodying it exactly. The area where the cartoon Scratchtasia is being shown and the documentary it is a part of is reminiscent of the Great Movie Ride pre-show in MGM Studios at the Walt Disney World Resort in Orlando, Florida. Pinnitchio is a parody of Pinocchio (1940). Homer and Marge dance at T.G.I. McScratchy's "where it's constantly New Year's Eve"; this is a parody of Pleasure Island at Walt Disney World where every night from 1990 through New Year's Eve 2005 was celebrated as though it were New Year's Eve. Walt Disney's alleged antisemitism is spoofed in the character of Roger Meyers Sr. in his cartoon Nazi Supermen Are Our Superiors. Euro Itchy & Scratchy Land is a parody of Disneyland Paris, then known as EuroDisney, which at the time was struggling commercially. Coincidentally, EuroDisney officially changed its name to Disneyland Paris on October 1, 1994, exactly one day before this episode aired in the United States.

== Reception ==
In its original broadcast, "Itchy & Scratchy Land" finished 67th in ratings for the week of September 26 to October 2, 1994, with a Nielsen rating of 9.0, equivalent to approximately 8.6 million viewing households. It was the third-highest-rated show on the Fox network that week, following Beverly Hills, 90210, The X-Files, and tied with Melrose Place.

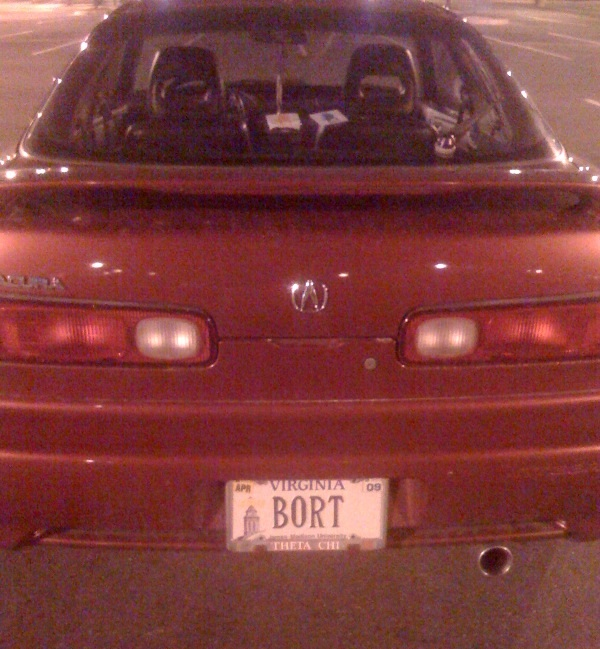
The "Bort" joke in the episode inspired vanity plates among fans.

Gary Russell and Gareth Roberts called it "an untypical episode, with an especially thin plot", but added that "anyone that's been to Disneyland will get the point". The episode placed seventh in a 2003 Entertainment Weekly list of the top 25 episodes of the series, with the authors remarking, "When the animatronics attack, the showdown between man and machine—okay, Homer and a giant robot mouse—is an uproarious rebuttal to capitalism run amok." The episode ranked sixth on Today's top ten The Simpsons episodes list, compiled in 2007. In 2019, Consequence ranked it tenth on its list of top 30 Simpsons episodes. In 2014, The Simpsons writers picked "Scratchtasia" from this episode as one of their nine favorite "Itchy & Scratchy" episodes of all time.

=== Legacy ===
The scene in the gift shop where Bart finds a personalized license plate with the name "Bort" has become part of popular culture, inspiring vanity plates among fans and souvenirs in The Simpsons-themed stores at Universal Orlando. Writer Bill Oakley said he always liked the joke but was surprised it took on a "legendary status". Planet Simpson author Chris Turner called the joke "unmistakably Simpsonian".
