= John Swartzwelder =

American comedy writer and novelist (born 1949)

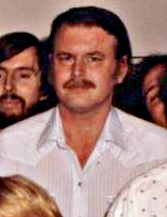
- Swartzwelder in a 1992 staff photo for The Simpsons
- Born: John Joseph Swartzwelder Jr. February 8, 1949 (age 77); Seattle, Washington, U.S.
- Occupations: Television writer, novelist
- Writing career
- Period: The Simpsons: 1990–2003, 2007; Novels: 2004–present
- Genres: Observational humor, surreal humor, black comedy, detective fiction, absurdism
- Notable works: The Simpsons; Frank Burly
- Website: johnswartzwelder.com

John Joseph Swartzwelder Jr. (born February 8, 1949) is an American comedy writer and novelist, best known for his work on the animated television series The Simpsons. Born in Seattle, Washington, Swartzwelder began his career working in advertising. He was later hired to work on comedy series Saturday Night Live in the mid-1980s as a writer. He later contributed to fellow writer George Meyer's short-lived Army Man magazine, which led him to join the original writing team of The Simpsons, beginning in 1989.

He worked on The Simpsons as a writer and producer until 2003, and later contributed to The Simpsons Movie. He wrote the largest number of Simpsons episodes (59 full episodes, with contributions to several others) by a large margin. After his retirement from the show, he began a career as a writer of self-published absurdist novels. He has written more than a dozen novels, the most recent of which, Dead Detective Mountain, was published in 2023.

Swartzwelder is revered among comedy fans and his colleagues. He is known for his reclusiveness, and gave his first-ever interview in 2021, in The New Yorker. Per Mike Sacks, "Swartzwelder's specialty on The Simpsons was conjuring dark characters from a strange, old America: banjo-playing hobos, cigarette-smoking ventriloquist dummies, nineteenth-century baseball players, rat-tailed carnival children, and pantsless, singing old-timers."

== Early life ==
Swartzwelder was born in Seattle, Washington, on February 8, 1949, the son of Gloria Mae (Matthews) and John Joseph Swartzwelder, Sr. He attended high school in Renton, Washington.

== Career ==
=== Saturday Night Live ===
In 1983, Swartzwelder sent a joke submission to the writers of Late Night with David Letterman, in which he signed but left no address. Writer Jim Downey traced Swartzwelder based on the Chicago postmark on the card via phone books at the New York Public Library. After he contacted Swartzwelder's mother in Seattle, she redirected him to her son, who was then working at an advertising agency in Chicago. Downey described Swartzwelder's interview as "one of the most spectacularly awful in history"; it consisted of him entering David Letterman's office without permission, and discussing the state of television (that it was "all shit") while smoking and drinking. He was not hired for Letterman, but Downey hired him for Saturday Night Live (SNL) beginning in 1985.

At SNL, Swartzwelder shared an office with Robert Smigel, and met George Meyer, who later proved instrumental in hiring him for The Simpsons. During his time on SNL, Swartzwelder became known for writing odder material. He was fired in mid-1986, which Smigel attributed to the network's pressure on show creator Lorne Michaels to make personnel changes. Meyer quit SNL and created the magazine Army Man, recruiting Swartzwelder to help write it. Meyer says his favorite line was by Swartzwelder in one issue: "I'm not strong enough to end it all, so I guess I'll kill myself." Meyer said of Army Man:

The only rule was that the stuff had to be funny and pretty short. To me, the quintessential Army Man joke was one of John Swartzwelder's: "They can kill the Kennedys. Why can't they make a cup of coffee that tastes good?" It's a horrifying idea juxtaposed with something really banal — and yet there's a kind of logic to it. It's illuminating because it's kind of how Americans see things: life's a big jumble, but somehow it leads to something I can consume. I love that.

=== 1988–2004: The Simpsons ===
In 1988, Sam Simon, a reader of Army Man, recruited Swartzwelder and Meyer to write for the animated sitcom The Simpsons. By 1994, with the show's sixth season, Swartzwelder was granted a special dispensation and allowed not to attend rewrite sessions with the rest of the staff, instead being allowed to send drafts of his scripts in from home so other writers could revise them as they saw fit. This was reportedly a result of Swartzwelder's heavy smoking coming into conflict with a newly implemented policy banning smoking in the writers' room. Swartzwelder's scripts typically needed less rewriting than those of other writers, with about 50% being used.

According to Simpsons creator Matt Groening, Swartzwelder wrote Simpsons episodes sitting in a booth at a coffee shop "drinking copious amounts of coffee and smoking endless cigarettes". When California passed an anti-smoking law, Swartzwelder bought the booth and installed it in his house, allowing him to continue his process in peace. In his only interview, given to The New Yorker in 2021, Swartzwelder said he had negotiated his contract to allow him to work from home, but that this had nothing to do with smoking; he also said he bought a new booth, rather than one from the diner.

In 1996, Swartzwelder created and produced his own pilot presentation for Fox, Pistol Pete, a spoof of western films. Starring Stephen Kearney, Mark Derwin, Lisa Robin Kelly, and Brian Doyle Murray, the pilot was shot using crew from the television series Gunsmoke at Swartzwelder's insistence. John Rich, veteran television director known for The Dick Van Dyke Show, All in the Family, and Gunsmoke, directed the pilot, which was shot at Veluzat Motion Picture Ranch. Fox passed on the pilot. It eventually surfaced online in 2014.

Swartzwelder left The Simpsons after the fifteenth season (2003–04). His last airing episode ("The Regina Monologues") was a "holdover" written for the fourteenth (2002–03) season. At 59 episodes, Swartzwelder has written more episodes of the show than any other crew member by a significant margin. Swartzwelder returned to contribute to The Simpsons Movie, released in 2007.

=== 2004–present: Novels ===
Since leaving The Simpsons, Swartzwelder has taken up writing absurdist novels, beginning in 2004 with the publication of science fiction detective story The Time Machine Did It starring private investigator Frank Burly. The next year he published Double Wonderful, a Western, before returning to the Burly character for How I Conquered Your Planet in 2006, The Exploding Detective in 2007, Dead Men Scare Me Stupid in 2008, Earth vs. Everybody in 2009, The Last Detective Alive in 2010, The Fifty Foot Detective in 2011, and The Million Dollar Policeman in 2012. In 2014, a children's book written in the late 1970s by Swartzwelder and illustrated by David Schutten was published by Green House Books. Swartzwelder self-publishes his books.

== Political views ==
Swartzwelder has been referred to as a libertarian and a "hardcore conservative". He is a gun rights advocate, and despite having written many of the environmentally themed Simpsons episodes, he has been described as an "anti-environmentalist". Simpsons writer David Cohen related a story of Swartzwelder going on an extended diatribe about how there is more rainforest on Earth now than there was 100 years ago.

== Reclusiveness ==
Swartzwelder is reclusive, and rarely makes media appearances. At one point, fans of The Simpsons debated his existence online; some theorized that "John Swartzwelder" was actually a pseudonym for when writers did not want to take credit for an episode, or for episodes that were penned by several writers in concert. Comedy writer Mike Sacks described Swartzwelder as the "Thomas Pynchon of the comedy world".

Swartzwelder declined several requests to participate in the audio commentaries on The Simpsons DVD sets. Executive producer David Mirkin once invited Swartzwelder to make a brief appearance in a prerecorded bit in which he would be asked if he wanted to take part, to which he would respond with "No" as an ironic punchline, but he refused. During the recording of the 2006 commentary for the ninth-season episode "The Cartridge Family", show runner Mike Scully called Swartzwelder's home. After presumably speaking with him for a minute, the man on the other end of the phone said, "It's too bad this really isn't John Swartzwelder." Scully and the others laughed, replied "Bye, John". After he had hung up, Scully said, "I know he's gonna sue us."

In 2016, Swartzwelder created a Twitter account. It was confirmed official by several of his former Simpsons colleagues. The account mostly tweets excerpts from Swartzwelder's books.

In 2021, Swartzwelder gave his only interview to date, with Mike Sacks in The New Yorker. Swartzwelder said he agreed to the interview out of his fondness for The New Yorker and the writers whose work it has published. Swartzwelder said he was humbled by the praise he has received from colleagues and Simpsons fans, and that he was proud that The Simpsons encouraged fans to keep track of the writers of their favorite television shows. He hopes The Simpsons "helped create a generation of wise guys, who live in a world where everybody is up to something. If that's all we've achieved, aside from the billions of dollars we've made, I'm satisfied."

== Legacy ==
Swartzwelder is revered among comedy fans. Fellow Simpsons writers have spoken highly of his writing and impact on the show. Matt Selman wrote an article for Time about Swartzwelder, extolling him as "one of the greatest comedy minds of all time. He is the comedy writer whose words makes [sic] the best comedy writers in the world laugh out loud." George Meyer said: "Even among comedy weirdos, he stands out. He's irreplaceable." Fellow writer Dan Greaney described Swartzwelder as "the best writer in the world today in any medium". Mike Sacks writes "It's been nearly twenty years since the reclusive, mysterious, almost mythical comedy writer John Swartzwelder left The Simpsons, and yet, to this day, one of the biggest compliments a Simpsons writer (or any comedy writer) can receive is to have a joke referred to as 'Swartzweldian.' Meaning: A joke that comes out of nowhere. A joke that no one else could have written. A joke that sounds almost as if it were never written, as if it's always existed." Sacks cites the following, from "Homer vs. the Eighteenth Amendment": "To alcohol: the cause of, and solution to, all of life's problems!"

== References on The Simpsons ==
Swartzwelder has been animated in the background of several episodes of The Simpsons. His animated likeness closely resembles musician David Crosby, which prompted Groening to state that anytime that David Crosby appears in a scene for no apparent reason, it is really Swartzwelder. Groening said that the appearance of the character Herman was based on Swartzwelder, with the exception of his one arm.

== Filmography ==
=== Television ===
Year	Film	Role	Notes
1985–86	Saturday Night Live	Writer, 18 episodes	Stars as a pirate in December 7, 1985 episode hosted by John Lithgow
1987	Nightlife	Writer, 1 episode	
1988	Women in Prison	Writer, 1 episode	
1988	Mr. President	Writer, 1 episode	
1988	The Dictator	Writer, 1 episode	
1989–2003	The Simpsons	Writer, 59 episodes, story editor, consultant, producer	
1996	Pistol Pete	Creator, executive producer, writer	Unsold pilot for Fox Broadcasting Company

=== Film ===
Year	Film	Role	Notes
2007	The Simpsons Movie	Writer	Additional credit for lyrics on "Spider Pig" and "Springfield Anthem"

=== Simpsons episodes ===
The Simpsons episodes written by Swartzwelder

- "Bart the General" (7G05) (1990)
- "The Call of the Simpsons" (7G07) (1990)
- "Life on the Fast Lane" (7G11) (1990)
- "The Crepes of Wrath" (Note: With George Meyer, Sam Simon and Jon Vitti)(7G13) (1990)
- "Treehouse of Horror" (Note: "Bad Dream House" segment)(7F04) (1990)
- "Two Cars in Every Garage and Three Eyes on Every Fish" (Note: With Sam Simon)(7F01) (1990)
- "Itchy & Scratchy & Marge" (7F09) (1990)
- "Bart Gets Hit by a Car" (7F10) (1991)
- "The War of the Simpsons" (7F20) (1991)
- "Bart the Murderer" (8F03) (1991)
- "Treehouse of Horror II" (Note: "Homer's Nightmare" segment, with Sam Simon)(8F02) (1991)
- "Homer at the Bat" (8F13) (1992)
- "Dog of Death" (8F17) (1992)
- "Brother, Can You Spare Two Dimes?" (8F23) (1992)
- "Itchy & Scratchy: The Movie" (9F03) (1992)
- "Whacking Day" (9F18) (1993)
- "Krusty Gets Kancelled" (9F19) (1993)
- "Rosebud" (1F01) (1993)
- "Homer the Vigilante" (1F09) (1994)
- "Bart Gets Famous" (1F11) (1994)
- "Bart Gets an Elephant" (1F15) (1994)
- "The Boy Who Knew Too Much" (1F19) (1994)
- "Itchy & Scratchy Land" (2F01) (1994)
- "Homer the Great" (2F09) (1995)
- "Bart's Comet" (2F11) (1995)
- "Homie the Clown" (2F12) (1995)
- "Radioactive Man" (2F17) (1995)
- "Treehouse of Horror VI" (Note: "Attack of the 50-Foot Eyesores" segment)(3F04) (1995) (as Scary John Swartzwelder)
- "Bart the Fink" (Note: Teleplay, story by Bob Kushell)(3F12) (1996)
- "Homer the Smithers" (3F14) (1996)
- "The Day the Violence Died" (3F16) (1996)
- "You Only Move Twice" (3F23) (1996)
- "Mountain of Madness" (4F10) (1997)
- "Homer vs. the Eighteenth Amendment" (4F15) (1997)
- "The Old Man and the Lisa" (4F17) (1997)
- "Homer's Enemy" (4F19) (1997)
- "The Cartridge Family" (5F01) (1997)
- "Bart Carny" (5F08) (1998)
- "King of the Hill" (5F16) (1998)
- "The Wizard of Evergreen Terrace" (5F21) (1998)
- "Homer Simpson in: 'Kidney Trouble'" (AABF04) (1998)
- "Homer to the Max" (AABF09) (1999)
- "Maximum Homerdrive" (AABF13) (1999)
- "Monty Can't Buy Me Love" (AABF17) (1999)
- "Take My Wife, Sleaze" (BABF05) (1999)
- "The Mansion Family" (BABF08) (2000)
- "Kill the Alligator and Run" (BABF16) (2000)
- "A Tale of Two Springfields" (BABF20) (2000)
- "The Computer Wore Menace Shoes" (CABF02) (2000)
- "Hungry, Hungry Homer" (CABF09) (2001)
- "Simpson Safari" (CABF13) (2001)
- "A Hunka Hunka Burns in Love" (CABF18) (2001)
- "The Lastest Gun in the West" (DABF07) (2002)
- "I Am Furious (Yellow)" (DABF13) (2002)
- "The Sweetest Apu" (DABF14) (2002)
- "The Frying Game" (DABF16) (2002)
- "Mr. Spritz Goes to Washington" (EABF09) (2003)
- "Treehouse of Horror XIV" (EABF21) (2003) (as Triple Admiral John Swartzwelder)
- "The Regina Monologues" (EABF22) (2003)

== Bibliography ==
=== Frank Burly ===
==== Novels ====
- The Time Machine Did It (2004): ISBN 0-9755799-0-8
- How I Conquered Your Planet (2006): ISBN 0-9755799-4-0
- The Exploding Detective (2007): ISBN 0-9755799-6-7
- Dead Men Scare Me Stupid (2008): ISBN 0-9755799-8-3
- Earth vs. Everybody (2009): ISBN 0-9822736-0-6
- The Last Detective Alive (2010): ISBN 0-9822736-2-2
- The Fifty Foot Detective (2011): ISBN 0-9822736-4-9
- The Million Dollar Policeman (2012): ISBN 0-9822736-6-5
- Detective Made Easy (2013): ISBN 0-9822736-8-1
- Burly Go Home (2017): ISBN 978-0989988506
- The Spy with No Pants (2020): ISBN 978-0989988544
- Dead Detective Mountain (2023): ISBN 978-0989988568

==== Short stories ====
- "The Monster That Wouldn't Sink" (2015)
- "Earth's Biggest Fan" (2015)

=== Standalones ===
- Double Wonderful (2005): ISBN 0-9755799-2-4
- The Animal Report (2014; illustrated by David Schutten): ISBN 978-1500873905
- The Squirrel Who Saved Practically Everybody (2019): ISBN 978-0989988520

== Notes ==
=== Sources ===
- Sacks, Mike (2014). And Here's the Kicker: Conversations with 21 Top Humor Writers. New York: Writers House. ISBN 978-1630640118.
