= The Day the Violence Died =

- The Simpsons episode
- Bart and Chester J. Lampwick stand in front of Springfield Elementary School as Lampwick holds what remains of his animated short Manhattan Madness.
- Episode no.: Season 7 Episode 18
- Directed by: Wes Archer
- Written by: John Swartzwelder
- Production code: 3F16
- Original air date: March 17, 1996

Guest appearances
- Kirk Douglas as Chester J. Lampwick; Phil Hartman as Lionel Hutz; Alex Rocco as Roger Meyers Jr.; Jack Sheldon as the Amendment; Suzanne Somers as herself

Episode features
- Couch gag: The Simpsons are colorless blobs; mechanical arms color and detail the family.
- Commentary: Bill Oakley; Josh Weinstein

Episode chronology
← Previous "Homer the Smithers"	Next → "A Fish Called Selma"
- The Simpsons season 7

"The Day the Violence Died" is the eighteenth episode of the seventh season of the American animated television series The Simpsons. It originally aired on the Fox network in the United States on March 17, 1996. It was written by John Swartzwelder and directed by Wes Archer. Kirk Douglas guest stars as Chester J. Lampwick, Alex Rocco as Roger Meyers Jr., Jack Sheldon as an anthropomorphic constitutional amendment, Suzanne Somers as herself, and Phil Hartman as Lionel Hutz. The end of the episode features Lester and Eliza, who resemble Bart and Lisa Simpson as they appeared in The Tracey Ullman Show in the 1980s.

In the episode, Bart meets a homeless man, Chester J. Lampwick, who claims that he is the creator of Itchy from The Itchy & Scratchy Show. Lampwick sues Itchy & Scratchy Studios for stealing his idea. After a Judge awards Lampwick US$800 billion, the studio is forced into bankruptcy and closes. When The Itchy & Scratchy Show is replaced by a parody of Schoolhouse Rock!'s "I'm Just a Bill" segment, Bart and Lisa try to bring back Itchy & Scratchy by studying copyright laws and legal precedents.

The episode finished 47th in ratings for the week of March 11–17, 1996, with a Nielsen rating of 9.2. It was the highest-rated show on the Fox network that week. It received a generally positive reception from television critics. DVD Movie Guide and the Los Angeles Daily News enjoyed the episode's focus on The Itchy & Scratchy Show.

== Plot ==
Top: Eliza and Lester, whose designs are based on versions of Lisa and Bart from The Tracey Ullman Show shorts. Bottom: Lisa and Bart as they appear in "The Day the Violence Died", bearing a close resemblance to Eliza and Lester.

During a parade honoring The Itchy & Scratchy Show, Bart meets an elderly homeless man, Chester J. Lampwick, who claims to be the creator of Itchy, the mouse, as well as the concept of cartoon violence. He insists Roger Meyers Sr., the supposed creator of the characters Itchy & Scratchy, stole his idea. He shows Bart his 1919 animated short, Manhattan Madness, to prove he created Itchy, but the film catches fire and is destroyed by the projector.

Bart lets Lampwick live at the Simpsons' house, but soon Marge wants him gone after he and Grampa fight. To compensate Lampwick for creating Itchy, he and Bart ask Roger Meyers Jr., CEO of Itchy & Scratchy Studios, for $800 billion. Meyers promptly throws them out.

Lampwick sues Itchy & Scratchy Studios with the help of Bart, attorney Lionel Hutz, and Homer as champerter. When Meyers' lawyer demands proof that Lampwick created Itchy, Bart remembers that he saw an original animation cel by Lampwick for sale at the Android's Dungeon. Bart buys the cel from Comic Book Guy and shows the courtroom its inscription, proving that Lampwick is the creator of Itchy. Meyers concedes that his father stole the Itchy character, but contends that most animation is based on plagiarism, saying that if nobody ripped off The Honeymooners there wouldn't be The Flintstones and if nobody ripped off Sgt. Bilko there would be no Top Cat. The judge rules in favor of Lampwick and orders Meyers to pay him $800 billion. Bart is pleased that Lampwick is no longer poor, but he is sad when he realizes the studio has gone bankrupt.

After failing to persuade Lampwick to finance Meyers's production of Itchy & Scratchy (for which he would receive royalties), Bart and Lisa find a legal precedent that could help resurrect the cartoon, but they discover that two other kids, Lester and Eliza, have beaten them to it. Lester and Eliza secure a large cash settlement for the studio when they realize that the design of Mr. ZIP, the post office mascot, was stolen from Roger Meyers Sr, in addition to exonerating Apu from a public nudity charge and reuniting Krusty with his estranged wife. Despite being happy that Itchy & Scratchy is back on the air, Bart and Lisa are disturbed that their spotlight has been stolen by two children who closely resemble them. Lester skateboards past the Simpsons' home and ominously stares at Bart through the window.

== Production ==
During their tenure as executive producers of The Simpsons, Bill Oakley and Josh Weinstein tried to include one episode related to The Itchy & Scratchy Show in every season. "The Day the Violence Died", written by John Swartzwelder and directed by Wes Archer, was The Itchy & Scratchy Show-related episode for the seventh season, and became a vehicle for jokes about animation. After completing the episode, Oakley commented, "This episode is one of the craziest episodes ever, I would dare say. It is so packed with references and inside jokes and the ending is so bizarre that a lot of people didn't understand it." The episode was considered polarizing. In one of its jokes, Bart asks Homer for a large sum of money and Homer immediately pulls out his wallet. Oakley described the scene as "very controversial" among the show's producers; Matt Groening, the creator of The Simpsons, in particular did not like it.

In Swartzwelder's original script, the "Amendment to Be" segment was a cartoon called Homage Alley that was consciously a parody of the humor style of The Simpsons, but the producers felt that it was not funny. As a result, it was replaced by the "Amendment to Be" cartoon, which is a parody of the "I'm Just a Bill" segment of the educational television series Schoolhouse Rock. Worried about potential lawsuits, the lawyer of The Simpsons made the animators change the design of the senator in the segment. Weinstein did the voice of the "Curly amendment" in the segment, claiming the other voice actors "couldn't do it exactly right." The end of the episode features Lester and Eliza, who save Itchy & Scratchy Studios. Bart and Lisa typically solve problems in the show, but the writers decided to try something different and have a new pair of characters take their positions. Lester's design is a slightly altered version of Bart's design in The Tracey Ullman Show and is voiced by Tress MacNeille, who normally voices Bart on temporary tracks.

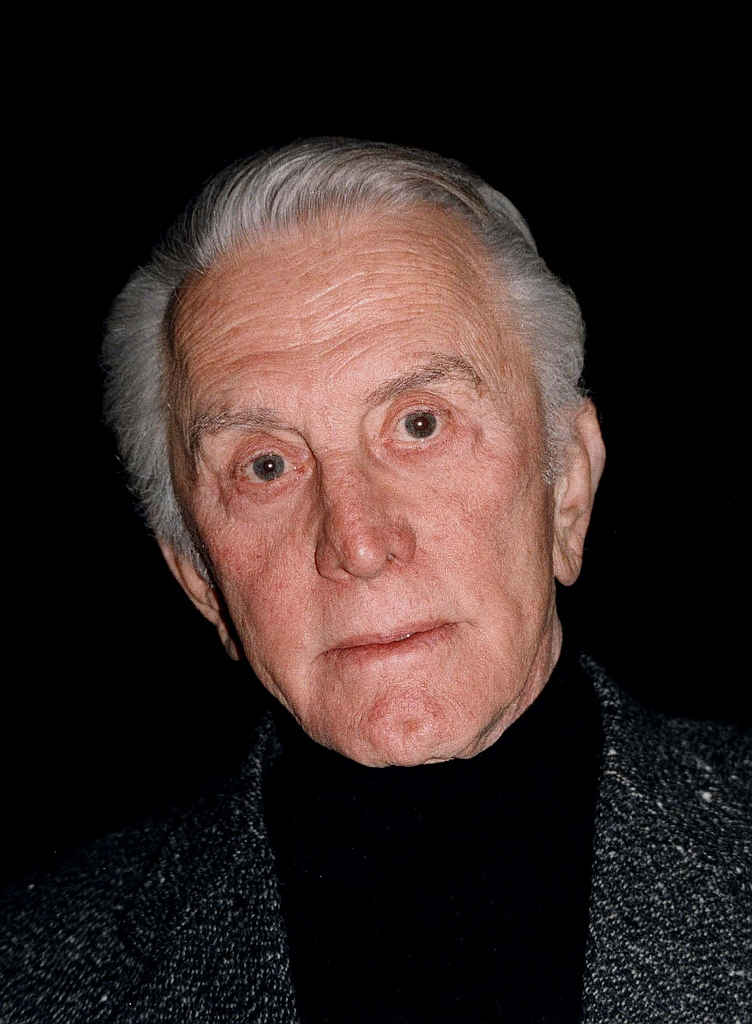
Kirk Douglas (pictured in 1994) guest stars in the episode as the voice of Chester J. Lampwick.

Actor Kirk Douglas guest stars in the episode as Chester J. Lampwick. William Hickey was the producers' first choice for the role, who they described as "famous for being a grouchy, mean old man"; Oakley and Weinstein, who often search for "the absolutely perfect voice" when looking for guest stars rather than simply using celebrities, felt that Hickey's gruff raspy voice would be perfect for the role, but he turned them down. In Nancy Cartwright's autobiography My Life as a 10-Year-Old Boy, she comments that the episode's script was a "gem" and recalls that Douglas's recording session, which was directed by Weinstein, was fraught with interruptions. He refused to wear the earphones supplied to him in the recording studio, saying they hurt his ears, so he was unable to hear Weinstein from his booth. Cartwright coached Douglas through his performance, who was in a hurry and insisted on doing a maximum of only two takes per line. Despite reading his lines all at once, he had trouble with one scene: the scene in which Lampwick tells Bart he created Itchy & the Scratchy required three takes, as Douglas continuously misread the line "I changed all that" as "I charged all that". Cartwright managed to get him to do a third, correct reading of the line by pretending to sneeze during his second take.

In his script, Swartzwelder randomly paired David Brinkley and Suzanne Somers together as the parade commentators. The producers were unable to get Brinkley to play his part, so he was instead voiced by Harry Shearer. However, they were successful in getting Somers to voice herself. Roger Meyers Jr. was voiced by Alex Rocco, who also voiced the character in "Itchy & Scratchy & Marge"; while the character had reappeared in several episodes, in those instances he was voiced by Hank Azaria. The episode also features recurring guest star Phil Hartman as lawyer Lionel Hutz.

== Cultural references ==
The episode's title alludes to the line "the day the music died" from Don McLean's hit 1971 song "American Pie". The cartoon "Itchy and Scratchy Meets Fritz the Cat" is a reference to the animated film Fritz the Cat (1972) that depicts drug use and sexual situations openly. Fritz the Cat was also the first animated movie to be rated X, before the NC-17 rating existed. The Manhattan Madness cartoon is based on one of the first animated cartoons, Winsor McCay's Gertie the Dinosaur. The first Itchy & Scratchy cartoon, "Steamboat Itchy", which originally appeared in "Itchy & Scratchy: The Movie", is a reference to Steamboat Willie, the first Mickey Mouse sound cartoon to be released, and Joseph P. Kennedy, father of former United States President John F. Kennedy, is listed as one of the cartoon's producers, along with composer George Gershwin helping with the cartoon's music.

Roger Meyers Sr. being cryogenically frozen is a reference to the myth that Walt Disney was frozen. The entire plot, revolving around the legal question of who created the anthropomorphic mouse Itchy, is also a reference to the historical debate over whether Mickey Mouse was created by Walt Disney or his animator Ub Iwerks, as well as whether Felix the Cat was created by Pat Sullivan or Otto Messmer. When Roger Meyers Jr. pleads his case in court, he mentions that several animated television series and characters were plagiarized from other series and characters: "Animation is built on plagiarism! If it weren't for someone plagiarizing The Honeymooners, we wouldn't have The Flintstones. If someone hadn't ripped off Sergeant Bilko, there'd be no Top Cat. Huckleberry Hound, Chief Wiggum, Yogi Bear? Hah! Andy Griffith, Edward G. Robinson, Art Carney." The "Amendment To Be" segment is a parody of the educational show Schoolhouse Rock, and more specifically "I'm Just a Bill", and refers to the Flag Desecration Amendment. Jack Sheldon, who sang the original song in "I'm Just a Bill", voices the song in the "Amendment to Be" segment. The episode has what the producers called "Swartzweldy things" like a bum carrying a bindle.

== Reception ==
In its original broadcast, "The Day the Violence Died" finished 47th in the ratings for the week of March 11–17, 1996, with a Nielsen rating of 9.2. The episode was the highest rated show on the Fox network that week.

"The Day the Violence Died" received generally positive reviews from television critics. DVD Movie Guide's Colin Jacobson enjoyed the episode and called it a "hoot", praising Harry Shearer's impression of David Brinkley. "It's hard to top the original Itchy cartoon – where else can you see a cartoon mouse kill both an Irishman and Teddy Roosevelt?", said Jacobson, further complimenting the episode's twist ending: "For once, when Bart and Lisa team up to do the right thing, it backfires badly." He also applauded the casting of Kirk Douglas as a guest star, and ended the review by calling the episode a "winner".

Total Film's Nathan Ditum named Douglas the 18th best guest star on The Simpsons. DVD Movie Guide claimed that any show focused on The Itchy & Scratchy Show is "hard to beat" and the Los Angeles Daily News considered this a "cause for joy". Jennifer Malkowski of DVD Verdict said that the best part of the episode is during The Itchy & Scratchy Show copyright trial, when lawyer Lionel Hutz "stalls for time by calling all of his surprise witnesses again: a ventriloquist and his dummy, Santa Claus with a broken leg, a caricature of John Swartzwelder, Ralph Wiggum, and the fattest twins in The Guinness Book of World Records". Malkowski concluded her review by giving the episode a grade of B−.

The episode was considered a classic by The Rockford Register Star, which enjoyed the "perfect parody of the old 'Schoolhouse Rock' cartoon, 'I'm Just a Bill'". DVD Movie Guide "loved" the first The Itchy & Scratchy Show cartoon, "Itchy & Scratchy Meet Fritz the Cat". In the book I Can't Believe It's a Bigger and Better Unofficial "Simpsons" Guide by Gary Russell and Gareth Roberts, they comment that "The Day the Violence Died" is "a great episode, with some clever observations on ideas and copyright, and a superb – and sinister – twist ending featuring the return of both Bart and Lisa from their days on The Tracey Ullman Show".

Columbia University offered a course that analyzed The Simpsons during the September 2005 school term. In one of the classes, entitled "The Simpsons' Self-Referentiality", students viewed "The Day the Violence Died", and later considered one of the episode's most memorable quotes to be: "Bart: 'Lisa, if I ever stop loving violence, I want you to shoot me.' Lisa: 'Will do.'"

Erik Adams praised the different styles of animation in the episode but wrote that the deus ex machina ending "might be too clever for its own good": "The Lester-and-Eliza ending feels so jarring because it exposes the episode’s façade: What we thought was the point of the episode is not the point of the episode. The show had been and would be sharper in its autocritiques, but as a stealth history of plagiarism in animation and a joke on the Simpson kids’ uncanny knack for solving all of Springfield’s biggest problems, 'The Day The Violence Died' works just fine.”
