= Krusty the Clown =

Fictional character from The Simpsons franchise

- The Simpsons character
- First appearance: "The Krusty the Clown Show"; The Tracey Ullman Show; January 15, 1989
- Created by: Matt Groening
- Voiced by: Dan Castellaneta

In-universe information
- Full name: Herschel Shmoikel Pinchas Yerucham Krustofsky
- Occupation: Television clown
- Family: Rachel Krustofsky (mother); Hyman Krustofsky (father)
- Children: Sophie Krustofsky (daughter)
- Religion: Judaism

Herschel Shmoikel Pinchas Yerucham Krustofsky, better known by his stage name Krusty the Clown, is a recurring character in the animated television series The Simpsons. Voiced by Dan Castellaneta, he is the longtime clown host of Bart and Lisa's favorite variety show featuring child-friendly sketches and often highly violent cartoons, most notably The Itchy & Scratchy Show. Despite his cheery onscreen persona, Krusty is a cynical, burned-out, addiction-riddled smoker. He has been the focus of many episodes, including some about his relationship with former co-star Sideshow Bob, who later became a major antagonist.

Krusty was created by cartoonist Matt Groening and partially inspired by Rusty Nails, a television clown from Groening's hometown. He was designed to resemble Homer Simpson in clown makeup because Groening originally planned to reveal Krusty as Homer’s secret identity. Krusty made his television debut in the Tracey Ullman Show short "The Krusty the Clown Show".

The character was the favorite of several writers. Castellaneta won a Primetime Emmy Award for voicing Krusty and several other characters, and critics have praised the character's pathos and Krusty-centered episodes for their satire of Hollywood.

== Role in The Simpsons ==
Krusty was raised on the Lower East Side of Springfield as the son of Rabbi Hyman Krustofsky. Little is known about his mother, Rachel, who died before the series' events. Hyman wanted Krusty to attend yeshiva and opposed his ambition to become a clown, believing that show business would distract him from his faith. It is later revealed that Krusty never had a Bar Mitzvah because Hyman feared he would disrupt the ceremony by "acting up." Krusty first performed slapstick comedy in secret. At a rabbis' convention, a rabbi jokingly squirted him with seltzer, washing off his clown makeup and revealing his identity to Hyman. Hyman then disowned him, and they did not speak for 25 years. After leaving Springfield's Lower East Side, Krusty begins his show-business career as a street mime in Tupelo, Mississippi.

Krusty later reconciled with his father with help from Bart and Lisa. As an adult, Krusty holds two Bar Mitzvahs: first a televised spectacle at Springfield Stadium intended to revive his canceled show, and later a simple ceremony designed to reconnect him with his father. Krusty later discovers that he has a daughter, Sophie, from a brief relationship with a Gulf War soldier, and the two begin to bond.

Krusty hosts The Krusty the Clown Show on Springfield's Channel 6. Aimed at children, it has many devoted viewers, including Bart and Lisa. In one episode, the Springfield program is described as the least popular version in the world. Clips from 1961 and 1963 show Krusty interviewing AFL–CIO president George Meany about collective bargaining agreements and dumping snow on Robert Frost. In 1973, Krusty performed a drugged-out version of The Doors' Break on Through (To the Other Side). By the 1980s, the show had become a children's program, although Krusty also provided updates on the 1982 Argentine invasion of the Falkland Islands.

Its recurring cast includes Sideshow Mel, Tina Ballerina, and Corporal Punishment, as well as Mr. Teeny. Sideshow Bob begins the series as Krusty's main sidekick. Years of abuse eventually lead Bob to frame Krusty for armed robbery, but Bart exposes the scheme. Bob later attempts to kill Krusty during one of Krusty's retirements, but the two reconcile; Krusty remarks that Bob's attacks boost his ratings. Sideshow Mel succeeds Bob and remains loyal despite enduring similar abuse.

Bart is one of Krusty's biggest fans. In the episode "Krusty Gets Busted", he declares, "I've based my whole life on Krusty's teachings," and sleeps in a room filled with Krusty merchandise. At Kamp Krusty, Bart becomes disillusioned when he discovers that the poorly run camp has little connection to Krusty beyond licensing his image. He exposes Sideshow Bob's plot to frame Krusty, helps revive Krusty's career with a comeback special, and reunites him with his estranged father.

Krusty licenses his name and image for a wide range of substandard products and services, from Krusty alarm clocks to Krusty crowd control barriers, many of which are dangerous. In one episode, every box of Krusty-O's, a cereal sold under his name, contains a jagged metal Krusty-O. Bart accidentally eats one and requires surgery to remove his appendix. Krusty's licensing company, the "Krusty Korporation", also runs disastrous promotions and business ventures. During the 1984 Summer Olympics, it sponsors a rigged promotion that backfires when the Soviet Union boycotts the games, costing Krusty $44 million. Krusty also owns and serves as the mascot of the fast-food chain Krusty Burger, where abandoned, half-eaten burgers are stapled together for reuse.

Krusty spends his money almost as quickly as he earns it. He lights his cigarettes with hundred-dollar bills, spends lavishly on pornographic magazines, and loses fortunes by gambling on horse races.

Krusty is a jaded show-business veteran who frequently gambles, smokes, and drinks. He has also abused Percodan and uses Pepto-Bismol and Xanax. He becomes depressed as soon as the cameras stop rolling. In Planet Simpson, Chris Turner describes Krusty as "the wizened veteran, the total pro" who depends on celebrity despite his misery. In "Bart the Fink", Krusty fakes his death after losing most of his fortune but returns when Bart points out that leaving show business would mean surrendering his celebrity status.

In "Mr. Spritz Goes to Washington", Krusty runs for Congress as a Republican in a campaign that satirizes partisan news coverage. After being elected, he passes a bill rerouting flights away from the Simpsons' house.

== Characterization ==
=== Creation ===
Krusty in his first appearance in the Simpsons short "The Krusty the Clown Show"

Krusty first appeared in "The Krusty the Clown Show", one of the Simpsons shorts from The Tracey Ullman Show. The short first aired on January 15, 1989. The character was partially inspired by television clown Rusty Nails, whom The Simpsons creator Matt Groening watched while growing up in Portland, Oregon. Director Brad Bird watched the same performer while growing up elsewhere in Oregon. Groening described Rusty Nails as a gentle clown whose program sometimes carried a Christian message, although he found the name frightening. Dan Castellaneta based Krusty's voice on Chicago television performer Bob Bell, who had a raspy voice and portrayed WGN-TV's Bozo the Clown from 1960 to 1984. Groening praised Castellaneta's voice work, saying that he had to leave the room whenever Castellaneta recorded as Krusty to avoid ruining the take. Krusty has also been compared with "Flunky the Late Night Viewer Mail Clown". The character was created and played by Jeff Martin, who later joined the writing staff of The Simpsons and wrote episodes featuring Krusty.

Film critic Eric Henderson described Krusty as the Simpsons character that "owes the biggest debt" to comedian Jerry Lewis. Asked about the resemblance, Groening said that "[Simpsons] characters are collaborations between the writers, animators, and actors".

Krusty's appearance is essentially Homer Simpson's with clown makeup. Groening said that "The satirical conceit that I was going for at the time was that The Simpsons was about a kid who had no respect for his father, but worshipped a clown who looked exactly like his father", a theme that became less important as the show developed. An early concept would have revealed Krusty as Homer's secret identity, but Groening abandoned the idea. In the episode "Homie the Clown", Homer attends Clown College, dresses as Krusty, and is mistaken for him. Krusty was originally conceived as an ordinary man wearing clown makeup, but David Silverman noted that "at some point, we decided he looked [like a clown] all the time". The producers debated whether Krusty should ever appear without his makeup but concluded that the distinction did not matter. Although "Krusty Gets Busted" and "Like Father, Like Clown" showed what appeared to be his real face, the writers decided that he did not look right without his clown features. Later episodes turned the ambiguity into a joke. In "Homer's Triple Bypass", Krusty attributes his "grotesque appearance" to multiple heart attacks and insists, "This ain't makeup." In "Bart the Fink", yellow makeup and black hair come off to reveal his natural white face and green hair, while removing his normal-looking fake nose exposes a naturally bulbous red one.

=== Development ===
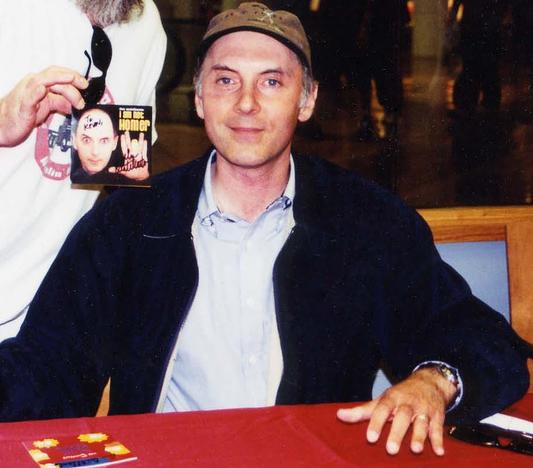
Dan Castellaneta (pictured) based Krusty's voice on Chicago television performer Bob Bell.

The season 3 episode "Like Father, Like Clown" first establishes that Krusty is Jewish. His religion was not part of the original concept; writers Jay Kogen and Wallace Wolodarsky proposed the idea. The episode parodies The Jazz Singer, in which a son defies his father to become an entertainer despite his strict religious upbringing. To complete the parody, the writers made Krusty Jewish and his father a rabbi. Al Jean proposed Krusty's surname, Krustofsky. Jackie Mason played Krusty's father, Rabbi Hyman Krustofsky, and won a Primetime Emmy Award for Outstanding Voice-Over Performance for the episode.

"Krusty Gets Busted" establishes that Krusty is illiterate. Subsequent episodes such as "Itchy & Scratchy & Marge" retained the trait, but the writers dropped it after the first few seasons because it limited the stories they could tell about him.

For "Homie the Clown", the artists permanently revised Krusty's muzzle and added bags under his eyes to distinguish him from Homer. In "Lisa's Wedding", set fifteen years in the future, the artists based an older version of Krusty on Groucho Marx.

Several original writers identified with Krusty and considered him a favorite to write. His show-business role created opportunities for industry satire, and many of his experiences and anecdotes draw on the writers' lives and stories they had heard. Krusty was a particular favorite of Brad Bird, who directed the first two Krusty episodes and tried to animate at least one scene in every episode centered on the character.

Simpsons showrunners Al Jean and Mike Reiss planned an animated Krusty spin-off in which he would be a single father in New York City. The proposed supporting cast included a cantankerous makeup artist and a boss resembling Ted Turner. They later reworked the unsuccessful concept into the animated series The Critic. In 1992, Matt Groening and James L. Brooks began planning a live-action spin-off of The Simpsons centered on Krusty, with Dan Castellaneta in the title role. They pitched the series in 1994. Groening and Michael Weithorn wrote a pilot in which Krusty moved to Los Angeles and hosted his own talk show. When contract negotiations failed, Groening stopped work on the project.

== Promotion and reception ==
Krusty has appeared on a range of Simpsons merchandise, including toys and apparel. He is also the title character of the 1992 video game Krusty's Fun House. In July 2007, 7-Eleven converted several stores into Kwik-E-Marts to promote The Simpsons Movie, selling products including Malt-O-Meal's "Krusty-O's" cereal. The Simpsons Ride, a simulator attraction, opened at Universal Studios Florida and Universal Studios Hollywood in May 2008. It is set in Krustyland, a theme park built by Krusty. In 2026, Krusty was featured in a Jack in the Box advertising campaign.

In 2015, The A.V. Club wrote that Krusty has "arguably the most pathos of any Simpsons character not named Moe Szyslak". The Guardian called Krusty an "institution" and "icon", and described him as an important "narrative fulcrum" for Sideshow Bob, the series' guests, and Itchy & Scratchy. It also said that Krusty's many poorly made products amounted to "the most pointed satire" of The Simpsons' own merchandising. According to Time, Krusty is a source of "showbiz jokes" as well as stories about "disappointment and living with one's limitations". It called his relationship with Hyman "something special" in a medium that "often ignores Jewish experience or writes it in as subtext". Philosopher Dieter Declercq argues that Krusty's merchandise embodies television's "phony commercial logic", which the series ridicules. Sociologist David Feltmate calls Krusty "a stereotype that marks him as an ethnic, rather than a religious, Jew". He writes that "Jewish traditions mean little to Krusty except when he faces an identity crisis".

In 2004, Dan Castellaneta won a Primetime Emmy Award for Outstanding Voice-Over Performance for voicing several characters, including Krusty, in "Today I Am a Clown". In 2007, Vanity Fair ranked "Krusty Gets Kancelled" as the ninth-best episode of The Simpsons, praising its guest stars, dark portrayal of Krusty's struggling show-business career, and satire of Hollywood and television.
