= Leaving Springfield =

2004 book by John Alberti and others

Leaving Springfield: The Simpsons and the Possibility of Oppositional Culture
- Book cover
- Author: John Alberti (editor)
- Language: English
- Series: Contemporary Film and Television Series
- Subject: The Simpsons
- Genre: Non-fiction
- Publisher: Wayne State University Press
- Publication date: 2004
- Publication place: United States
- Media type: Paperback
- Pages: 384
- ISBN: 0-8143-2849-0
- OCLC: 51323494
- Dewey Decimal: 791.45/72 21
- LC Class: PN1992.77.S58 L43 2004

Leaving Springfield: The Simpsons and the Possibility of Oppositional Culture is a non-fiction compilation work analyzing the effect of the television program The Simpsons on society, edited by John Alberti. The book was published in 2004 by Wayne State University Press. Contributors to the work include academics associated with Northern Kentucky University, the University of Wisconsin–Stevens Point, The Australian National University, and the University of Sydney.

The book discusses the nature of The Simpsons and its impact on society from the perspective of popular culture and that of political satire. The work received a positive review from Luke E. Saladin of Scripps Howard News Service for the breadth of issues discussed in the book, and was criticized by Cathlena Martin in a review in the journal ImageTexT: Interdisciplinary Comics Studies for a lack of discussion and analysis of gender issues and the role of women in the television series.

== Authors ==
John Alberti, the editor of the work, is also the writer of the book's introduction. Alberti teaches American literature and critical studies at Northern Kentucky University, where he is an associate professor of English. Alberti notes that there is a distinction between poking fun at something and satire: "Satire involves defining a kind of moral or political point of view and using humor to show how it's not living up to this ethical standard." Alberti told CanWest News Service that rather than the Fox Network, the most valuable database for information on The Simpsons when doing research for the book was "an online archive established, maintained and vetted by unpaid Simpsons enthusiasts". Other contributors include David L. G. Arnold, who teaches English at the University of Wisconsin–Stevens Point; Duncan Stuart Beard, who holds a Ph.D. in English literature from The Australian National University; and Mick Broderick, Associate Director of the Centre for Millennial Studies the University of Sydney.

== Contents ==
The book analyzes the impact of The Simpsons, both as a popular television program as well as its use of political satire. Leaving Springfield discusses the financial success the program has had, despite often parodying the forms of capitalism it also promotes. Commentators in the book take a look at the use of parody and satire in society to critique itself by discussing the impact of the television series on its viewership and its place within television comedy history.

== Reception ==
Luke E. Saladin of Scripps Howard News Service notes that an "especially popular theme in the essays" contained in the work is the fact that The Simpsons promotes its nature as a corporate product of Fox, while simultaneously denigrating the Fox network in jabs during the program. Saladin also notes that essays in the book discuss The Simpsons' "place in television history, its treatment of social issues and capitalism, and everything else from the Cold War and nuclear arms to what Homer Simpson's narcissism tells us about our own tendencies".

In her review of the book for the journal ImageTexT: Interdisciplinary Comics Studies, Cathlena Martin is critical, and points out that the book "lacks a feminist study of The Simpsons", noting: "A weakness of this collection is that it does not address more gender issues and analyze the main or supporting female characters more. ... The lack of analysis with regard to the female members of Springfield is decisively missing." Jeremy G. Butler cites the book as an example in his work Television: Critical Methods and Applications, when noting that "books on The Simpsons have become a cottage industry". An essay from the book on "Cultural Conflicts" is required reading in a sociology course on The Simpsons: "The Simpsons Global Mirror", at the University of California, Berkeley.
