= Itchy & Scratchy & Marge =

- The Simpsons episode
- Episode no.: Season 2 Episode 9
- Directed by: Jim Reardon
- Written by: John Swartzwelder
- Production code: 7F09
- Original air date: December 20, 1990

Guest appearances
- Alex Rocco as Roger Meyers Jr.

Episode features
- Chalkboard gag: "I will not pledge allegiance to Bart"
- Couch gag: The couch is missing and the family all look around puzzled.
- Commentary: Matt Groening; Al Jean; Mike Reiss; Jim Reardon

Episode chronology
← Previous "Bart the Daredevil"	Next → "Bart Gets Hit by a Car"
- The Simpsons season 2

"Itchy & Scratchy & Marge" is the ninth episode of the second season of the American animated television series The Simpsons. It first aired on Fox in the United States on December 20, 1990. In the episode, which is a satire of censorship issues, Maggie bullies Homer by attacking him with a mallet and Marge blames The Itchy & Scratchy Show for Maggie's actions. It was written by John Swartzwelder and was the first episode to be directed by Jim Reardon. Alex Rocco makes his first of three guest appearances as Roger Meyers Jr.

== Plot ==
Homer clumsily attempts to build a spice rack for Marge, when Maggie suddenly knocks him out by hitting him on the head with a mallet. Marge is puzzled by Maggie's behavior until she realizes that Maggie is imitating the violence on The Itchy & Scratchy Show. Marge forbids Bart and Lisa from watching the show, but they continue to watch it at their friends' houses. Marge writes a letter to the cartoon studio asking them to tone down the violence, but chairman, Roger Meyers Jr. dismisses her concerns, and produces a cartoon where Itchy & Scratchy kill a squirrel caricature of Marge. This prompts Marge to form a protest group.

Marge organizes Springfieldians for Nonviolence, Understanding, and Helping (SNUH), and forces her family to picket outside the studio. SNUH gains momentum and residents boycott The Krusty the Clown Show, which airs Itchy & Scratchy cartoons. After Marge appears on the panel discussion show Smartline, concerned parents send thousands of angry letters to Meyers, who reluctantly agrees to eliminate violence from Itchy & Scratchy and solicits story ideas from Marge. The children dislike the highly schmaltzy format change and abandon the cartoons to play outside instead.

Afterwards, a traveling exhibition of Michelangelo's sculpture David schedules a stop in Springfield. Other SNUH members urge Marge to protest the exhibition due to its nudity, but Marge, an artist herself, considers David a masterpiece. During another Smartline appearance, Marge concedes it is hypocritical to censor Itchy & Scratchy and not David as they are both free forms of expression, realizing that her protests have done more harm than good.

Now free of public negativity, Itchy & Scratchy quickly returns to its old format after SNUH disbands, prompting the town's kids to stop going outside and resume watching the show. While Marge and Homer view David at an art museum, Marge laments that the kids would rather watch violent cartoons than see a work of great art. Homer cheers her up by revealing that the school is forcing students to see the sculpture on a field trip to the museum.

== Production ==
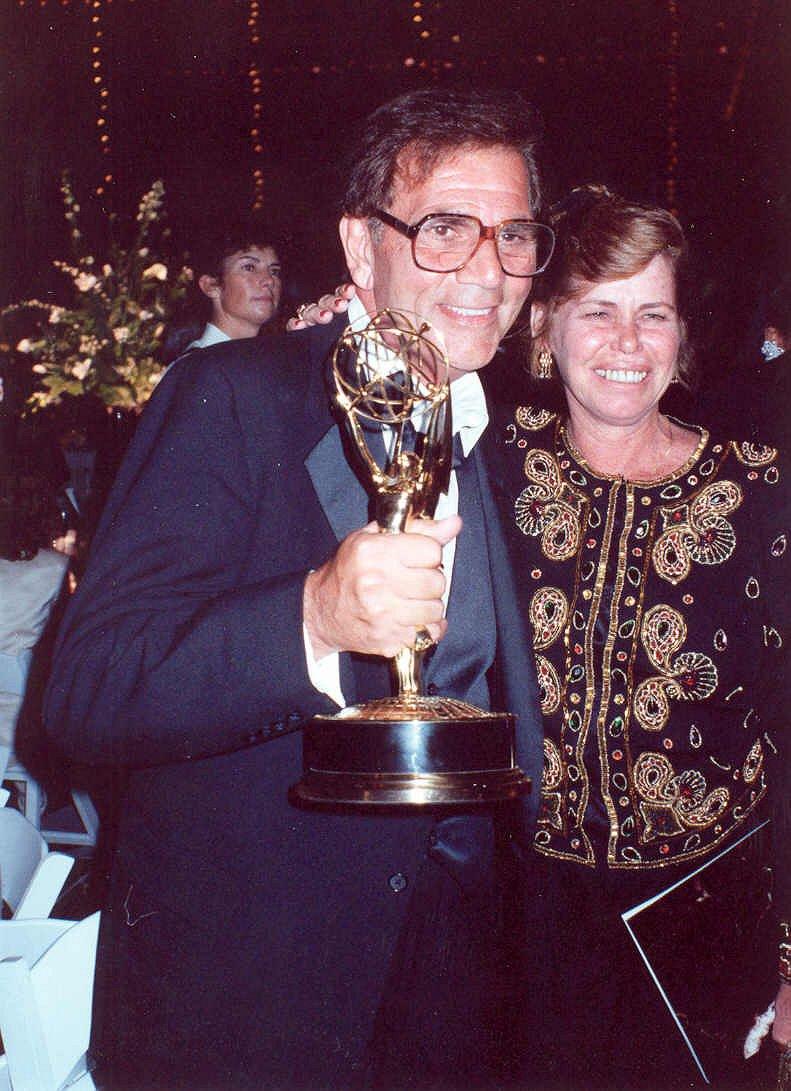
This was the first episode in which Alex Rocco guest starred as Roger Meyers, Jr.

"Itchy & Scratchy & Marge" is an acclaimed episode that dealt with censorship issues and allowed the writers to insert several Itchy & Scratchy cartoons, which many fans had been clamoring for. The episode was written by John Swartzwelder, who loved Itchy & Scratchy and wrote several episodes that have them at the center. The episode was partially inspired by Terry Rakolta, who protested the Fox network over the show Married... with Children. For the episode, which handles a large issue, the writers tried not to have a point of view and looked at both sides, despite what the writers personally felt. During the original airing of the episode, the Fox satellite blew out and the entire West coast of the United States missed the first act of the episode.

This was the first episode directed by Jim Reardon, who had previously made a student film called "Bring Me the Head of Charlie Brown" which was very violent and the experience served him well for this episode. There are several characters who work at I&S studios who are caricatures of real people: the animator who draws the Marge/Squirrel is based on Eddie Fitzgerald, who worked at Filmation and the three people with Meyers when he is asking Marge for suggestions are caricatures of Rich Moore, David Silverman and Wes Archer.

Alex Rocco made his first of three appearances as Roger Meyers, Jr. Many staff members on The Simpsons were huge fans of The Godfather, and Jim Reardon looked for a way to shoot Meyers in the eye as a reference to Rocco's character Moe Greene. Rocco enjoyed voicing Meyers as the role offered him a chance to portray a "big-shot," and later professed that he was nervous while recording the part because he had never done a voice-over before. At first, he tried to come up with a unique voice for Meyers, but was told to "just be [himself]."

The long montage of the children of Springfield playing was directed by Bob Anderson and is making a satirical point by saying the opposite of what the writers believed. The segment was written by John Swartzwelder and the idea of using Beethoven's 6th Symphony was in the original script. James L. Brooks had wanted the episode to end with the montage, but the writers disagreed. Roger Meyers, Jr. makes his first appearance in this episode, as does Sideshow Mel, although he does not have any lines until the later episode "Radio Bart".

== Cultural references ==
An extended parody of the shower scene from the movie Psycho

The scene where Maggie hits Homer over the head with a mallet is an extensive parody of the shower scene from Psycho, in which the music and camera angles are almost identical. The music heard while the children play outside is the first movement of Beethoven's Pastoral Symphony, and is similar to a segment of the Disney film Fantasia. Nelson whitewashing a fence at the end of the sequence is a reference to The Adventures of Tom Sawyer and resembles Norman Rockwells painting Tom Sawyer (Whitewashing the Fence). Maggie would also shoot at Homer's photo in the eye, ala the shooting death of Moe Greene in The Godfather.

== Reception ==
In its original broadcast, "Itchy & Scratchy & Marge" was watched by 22.2 million viewers, finishing 34th in ratings for the week of December 17–23, 1990 with a Nielsen rating of 12.9. It was the highest-rated show on Fox that week.

Gary Russell and Gareth Roberts, authors of the book I Can't Believe It's a Bigger and Better Updated Unofficial Simpsons Guide praised the episode, saying that "Homer's doomed attempt to build a spice rack is only the start of another great episode, which works as a superb debate about television violence and politically inspired censorship [and that] the ending is especially poignant, as the pedagogues of Springfield swoop on Michelangelo's David as an example of filth and degradation".

Nathan Rabin of The A.V. Club praised the episode for its satire. He wrote, "[The episode] contains one of my favorite sequences not just in The Simpsons but in television as a whole. In it, a censorship-happy Marge has neutered Itchy & Scratchy to the point where the children of Springfield are moved to do the unthinkable: stop watching television. [...] A dystopia instantly becomes a small-town paradise, a happy realm of frolicking children and sunny innocence as kids wake up from a TV fog and embrace life's rich pageantry. It's a lovely, lyrical, even beautiful sequence even if it's light on gags. It presents, then ruthlessly yanks back, an alternate universe Springfield ruled by dewy innocence rather than greed and mob mentality." He also felt the episode "got to make a relevant point in line with writer John Swartzwelder's libertarianism without sacrificing the momentum of the episode or losing track of the characters and turning them into mere sounding boards for their creator's beliefs".

In his only interview to date, Swartzwelder listed "Itchy & Scratchy & Marge" as among his favorite Simpsons episodes that he had written.

Empire named the Psycho parody as the second best film parody in the show. "The best throwaway gags blindside the unsuspecting viewer in episodes that are nominally about something else [...] Hitchcock is ripped off more than any other director but this is the most lovingly rendered reference." The Psycho parody was named the 22nd greatest film reference in the history of the show by Total Film's Nathan Ditum.

In March 2023, Hope Carrasquilla, a charter school principal in Tallahassee, Florida was forced to resign after complaints about images of David being shown to sixth-grade students without parental consent, a situation which drew comparisons to the ending of this episode.
