= The Simpsons season 5 =

Season of television series

The Simpsons
- Season 5
- DVD cover featuring the Simpson family (from left to right) Homer, Santa's Little Helper, Marge, Lisa, Snowball II, Maggie and Bart sitting down watching television inside a TV.
- Showrunners: David Mirkin (20 episodes); Al Jean; Mike Reiss (2 episodes)
- No. of episodes: 22

Release
- Original network: Fox
- Original release: September 30, 1993 – May 19, 1994

Season chronology
- ← Previous; Season 4 Next → Season 6

The fifth season of the American animated sitcom The Simpsons aired on Fox between September 30, 1993, and May 19, 1994. The showrunner for the fifth production season was David Mirkin who executive produced 20 episodes, with the season being produced by Gracie Films and 20th Century Fox Television. Al Jean and Mike Reiss executive produced the remaining two, which were both holdovers that were produced for the previous season. The season contains some of the series' most acclaimed and popular episodes, including "Cape Feare", "Lisa vs. Malibu Stacy", "Homer Goes to College", "Deep Space Homer", and "Rosebud". It also includes the 100th episode, "Sweet Seymour Skinner's Baadasssss Song". The season was nominated for two Primetime Emmy Awards and won an Annie Award for Best Animated Television Program as well as an Environmental Media Award and a Genesis Award. The DVD box set was released in Region 1 on December 21, 2004, Region 2 on March 21, 2005, and Region 4 on March 23, 2005.

== Production ==
The season was the first to be executive produced by David Mirkin, who would also run the following season. Several of the show's original writers who had worked on The Simpsons since the first season had left following the completion of season four. Jay Kogen, Wallace Wolodarsky, Sam Simon and Jeff Martin wrote their final episodes for the season four production run. Showrunners Al Jean and Mike Reiss left to produce their own series The Critic, but returned in subsequent seasons to produce more Simpsons episodes, and Jean again became the showrunner starting with season thirteen. George Meyer and John Swartzwelder, Conan O'Brien, Frank Mula and future showrunners Bill Oakley and Josh Weinstein all stayed with the show following the previous season. O'Brien would leave the series halfway through the production of the season to host his own show on NBC, Late Night with Conan O'Brien. He had been working on "Homer Goes to College" when he found out he was chosen to host Late Night and was forced to walk out on his contract. He later had a cameo appearance in "Bart Gets Famous". He recorded his part while Late Night was on the air, but O'Brien thought that his show might be canceled by the time the episode aired.

A whole new group of writers was brought in for this season. Jace Richdale was the first to be hired by Mirkin and others to receive their first writing credits were Greg Daniels and Dan McGrath. Mike Scully wrote "Lisa's Rival", which was produced for this season, but aired the next. Two freelance writers wrote episodes: David Richardson wrote "Homer Loves Flanders" while Bill Canterbury received two writing credits. Bob Anderson and Susie Dietter, who had previously worked on the show as part of the animation staff, would direct their first episodes.

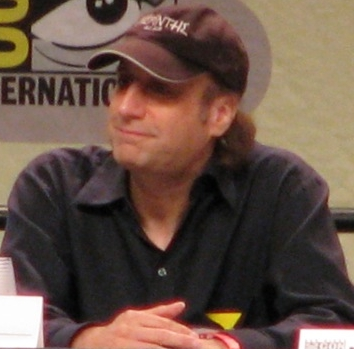
David Mirkin was the showrunner for this season.

The season started off with "Homer's Barbershop Quartet" which was chosen as the season premiere because it guest starred George Harrison. The Fox executives had wanted to premiere with "Homer Goes to College" because it was a National Lampoon's Animal House parody, but the writers felt "Homer's Barbershop Quartet" would be a better episode because of Harrison's involvement. It and the second episode "Cape Feare", which guest starred Kelsey Grammer as Sideshow Bob, were the last episodes produced by the "original team" of writers. Compared to previously produced episodes, the episode featured several elements that could be described as cartoonish. This was a result of the staff's careless attitude towards the end of season four as the majority of them were leaving which, combined with the shortness of the episode, led to the creation of the rake sequence, which became a memorable moment for this episode. "Cape Feare" and "Rosebud" were both broadcast early in the season and are amongst the series' most acclaimed episodes, both having placed highly on Entertainment Weekly's list of the top 25 episodes. The episode "Deep Space Homer" was the only episode to be written by David Mirkin and was controversial amongst the show's writing staff when the episode was in production. Some of the writers felt that having Homer go into space was too "large" an idea. Matt Groening felt that the idea was so big that it gave the writers "nowhere to go". As a result, every aspect of the show was worked on to make the concept work. The writers focused more upon the relationship between Homer and his family and Homer's attempts to be a hero. "Sweet Seymour Skinner's Baadasssss Song" was the series' 100th episode. It was chosen because it heavily featured Bart and was promoted as "Bart's biggest prank ever," even though Bart did not actually pull any pranks in the episode; rather, Bart accidentally let his dog loose, eventually resulting in Principal Skinner's firing. Cletus Spuckler and the Rich Texan were the only recurring characters to be introduced this season, first appearing in "Bart Gets an Elephant", and "$pringfield" respectively. Other minor characters who first appeared this season were Luigi and Baby Gerald. Two more episodes, "Bart of Darkness" and "Lisa's Rival" were produced as part of the season five (1F) production run, but both aired the following season.

== Voice cast & characters ==
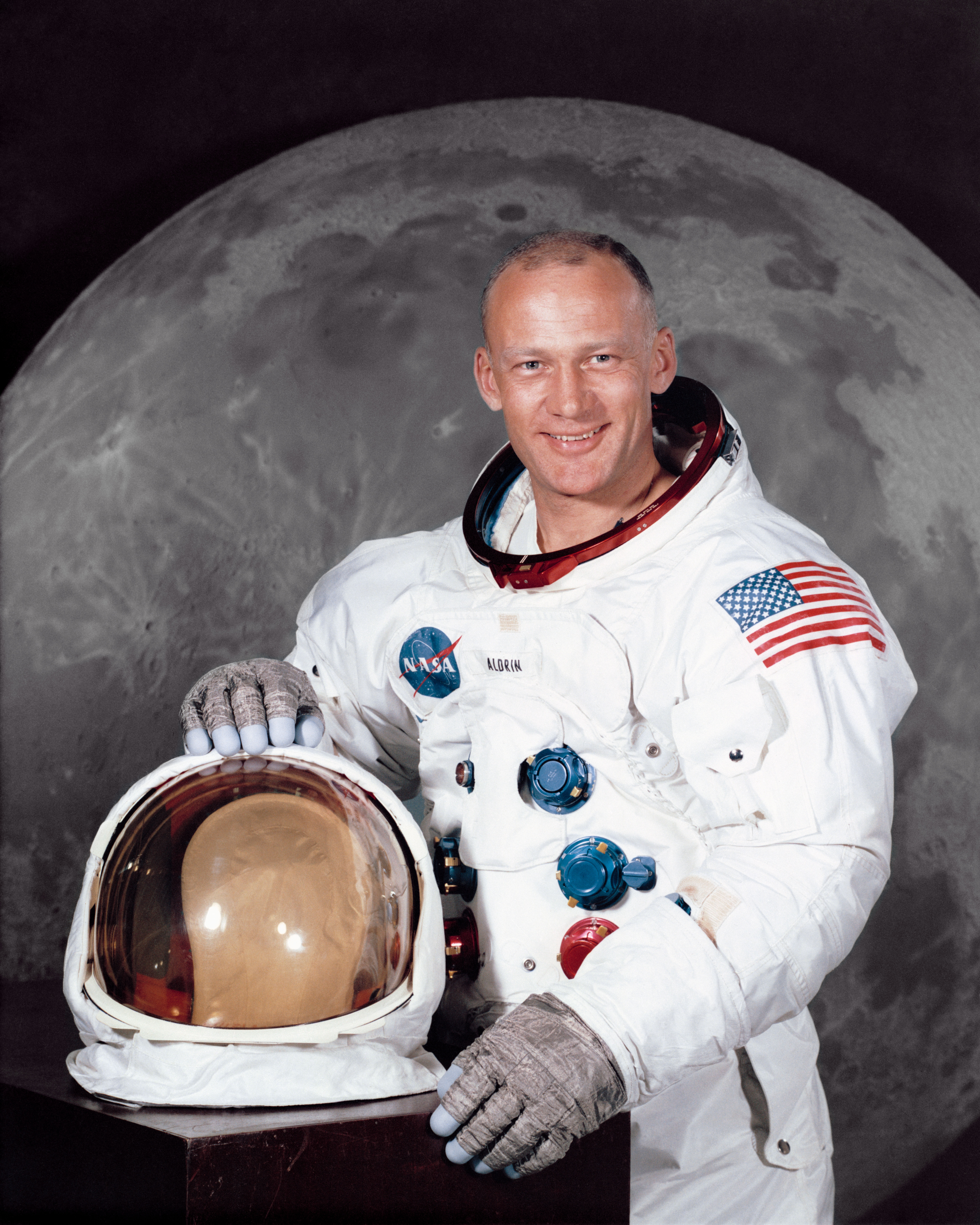
Astronaut Buzz Aldrin guest starred as himself in the episode "Deep Space Homer"

=== Main cast ===
- Dan Castellaneta as Homer Simpson, Mayor Quimby, Barney Gumble, Grampa Simpson, Captain McCallister, Groundskeeper Willie, Krusty the Clown, Hans Moleman, Scott Christian, and various others
- Julie Kavner as Marge Simpson, Patty Bouvier, Selma Bouvier and various others
- Nancy Cartwright as Bart Simpson, Nelson Muntz, Ralph Wiggum, Kearney, Todd Flanders, Rod Flanders and various others
- Yeardley Smith as Lisa Simpson
- Hank Azaria as Chief Wiggum, Apu, Moe Szyslak, Snake Jailbird, Marty, Lou, Benjamin, Doug, Carl Carlson, Rich Texan, Professor Frink, Comic Book Guy, Bumblebee Man and various others
- Harry Shearer as Principal Skinner, Herman Hermann, Ned Flanders, Reverend Lovejoy, Jasper Beardsley, Rainier Wolfcastle, Blue-Haired Lawyer, Mr. Burns, Waylon Smithers, Richard Nixon, Gary, George H. W. Bush, Lenny Leonard, Otto Mann, Dr. Hibbert, Kang and Kodos, Kent Brockman, Captain McCallister, Charlie, Gunter and Ernst, Bill, and various others

=== Recurring ===
- Pamela Hayden as Sarah Wiggum, Milhouse Van Houten, Jimbo Jones, Wendell Borton and various others
- Maggie Roswell as Maude Flanders, Helen Lovejoy, Luann Van Houten, Miss Hoover and various others
- Russi Taylor as Martin Prince, Sherri and Terri, Uter Zorker and various others
- Tress MacNeille as Agnes Skinner
- Marcia Wallace as Edna Krabappel
- Frank Welker as Santa's Little Helper, various animals

=== Guest stars ===
- Phil Hartman as Troy McClure, Lionel Hutz (various episodes)
- George Harrison as himself ("Homer's Barbershop Quartet")
- David Crosby as himself ("Homer's Barbershop Quartet")
- The Dapper Dans as the singing voices of the Be Sharps ("Homer's Barbershop Quartet")
- Kelsey Grammer as Sideshow Bob ("Cape Feare")
- The Ramones as themselves ("Rosebud")
- Pamela Reed as Ruth Powers ("Marge on the Lam")
- George Fenneman as the narrator ("Marge on the Lam")
- James Brown as himself ("Bart's Inner Child")
- Albert Brooks (credited as A. Brooks) as Brad Goodman ("Bart's Inner Child")
- Ernest Borgnine as himself ("Boy-Scoutz 'n the Hood")
- Michelle Pfeiffer as Mindy Simmons ("The Last Temptation of Homer")
- Werner Klemperer as Colonel Klink ("The Last Temptation of Homer")
- Gerry Cooney as himself ("$pringfield (or, How I Learned to Stop Worrying and Love Legalized Gambling)")
- Robert Goulet as himself ("$pringfield (or, How I Learned to Stop Worrying and Love Legalized Gambling)")
- Sam Neill as Molloy ("Homer the Vigilante")
- Conan O'Brien as himself ("Bart Gets Famous")
- James Woods as himself ("Homer and Apu")
- Kathleen Turner as Stacy Lovell ("Lisa vs. Malibu Stacy")
- Buzz Aldrin as himself ("Deep Space Homer")
- James Taylor as himself ("Deep Space Homer")

== Reception ==
On Rotten Tomatoes, the fifth season of The Simpsons has a 100% approval rating based on 5 critical reviews.

=== Awards ===
The Simpsons won an Annie Award for Best Animated Television Production, while David Silverman received a nomination for "Best Individual Achievement for Creative Supervision in the Field of Animation". "Bart Gets an Elephant" won both an Environmental Media Award for "Best Television Episodic Comedy" and a Genesis Award for "Best Television Comedy Series".

At the Primetime Emmy Awards, Alf Clausen and Greg Daniels received a nomination in the "Outstanding Individual Achievement in Music and Lyrics" category for the song "Who Needs The Kwik-E-Mart?" from the episode "Homer and Apu". Clausen also was nominated for "Outstanding Individual Achievement in Music Composition for a Series (Dramatic Underscore)" for the episode "Cape Feare". The producers submitted episodes for "Outstanding Comedy Series" category rather than the "Outstanding Animated Program" as they had previously done and were not nominated. The series was also nominated for a Saturn Award for "Best Genre Television Series".

At the 10th annual Television Critics Association Awards, the fifth season of the show was nominated for "Outstanding Achievement in Comedy", but lost to Frasier.

=== Ratings ===
Like the previous three seasons, The Simpsons aired Thursday at 8:00 pm in the United States and was coupled with the series The Sinbad Show. "Homer's Barbershop Quartet", the season premiere, finished 30th in the ratings with a Nielsen rating of 12.7. "Treehouse of Horror IV", which was broadcast on October 28, was the highest rated episode of the season, finishing 17th with a Nielsen rating of 14.5 and finishing ninth in terms of viewers, being seen by approximately 24 million. "Secrets of a Successful Marriage", the season finale, aired during the week of May 16–22, 1994 and finished 43rd with a Nielsen rating of 9.8.

== Episodes ==
No. overall	No. in season	Title	Directed by	Written by	Original release date	Prod. code	U.S. viewers (millions)
82	1	"Homer's Barbershop Quartet"	Mark Kirkland	Jeff Martin	September 30, 1993	9F21	19.9
In a flashback, Homer recounts his time with a barbershop quartet called The Be Sharps that also featured Principal Skinner, Apu and Chief Wiggum who was later replaced with Barney. The group became music stars with their hit song "Baby on Board" and won a Grammy. Eventually, Homer started missing his family and the group began to lose its popularity, so it broke up. Guest stars: George Harrison and David Crosby
83	2	"Cape Feare"	Rich Moore	Jon Vitti	October 7, 1993	9F22	20.0
Bart starts receiving threatening letters in the mail and it is soon revealed that they were sent to him by Sideshow Bob. Bob is released from prison, so Bart is placed in the Witness Relocation Program and the Simpson family is moved to Terror Lake. However, Bob follows the Simpsons there and sneaks onto the family's houseboat and tries to kill Bart. Cornered, Bart asks Bob to sing the entire score of H.M.S. Pinafore as a last request. Bob does so, and during his performance the boat drifts through Springfield and Bob is caught.
84	3	"Homer Goes to College"	Jim Reardon	Conan O'Brien	October 14, 1993	1F02	18.1
After failing a test at the nuclear plant, Homer's lack of a college degree is revealed and he is sent back to pass a nuclear physics class. Homer, having seen too many bad National Lampoon's Animal House knock-off movies, goofs off, so he is sent to a group of boys for tutoring. The boys, who are stereotypical nerds, try to help Homer, but he instead tries to help them party and decides to pull a prank on another college. They steal Springfield A&M's mascot, but his friends are caught and expelled. Homer invites them to live with him, but his family soon become angered by their new housemates, so Homer decides to try to help them get back into college. Consequentially, he fails his final exam and is convinced by Marge to return to college for another year.
85	4	"Rosebud"	Wes Archer	John Swartzwelder	October 21, 1993	1F01	19.5
After a disastrous birthday party, Mr. Burns pines for his long-lost childhood toy, a teddy bear named Bobo. The bear ends up in the hands of Maggie and when Homer discovers this, he tries to use the bear to get a large reward from Burns. When Burns agrees, Homer tries to hand the bear over, but is stopped by Maggie. Homer, seeing that Maggie has become attached to the bear, decides not to give it back to Mr. Burns, who promises that Homer will regret the decision. Mr. Burns later returns and talks to Maggie and she eventually gives it back to him.
86	5	"Treehouse of Horror IV"	David Silverman	Conan O'Brien (wraparounds)	October 28, 1993	1F04	24.0
86	5	"Treehouse of Horror IV"	David Silverman	Greg Daniels & Dan McGrath	October 28, 1993	1F04	24.0
86	5	"Treehouse of Horror IV"	David Silverman	Bill Oakley & Josh Weinstein	October 28, 1993	1F04	24.0
86	5	"Treehouse of Horror IV"	David Silverman	Bill Canterbury	October 28, 1993	1F04	24.0
In a parody of Night Gallery, Bart tells three scary stories based on paintings: "The Devil and Homer Simpson": Homer sells his soul to the Devil (Ned Flanders) for a doughnut.; "Terror at 5½ Feet": While riding the bus to school, Bart discovers that there is a Gremlin on the side of the bus.; "Bart Simpson's Dracula": The Simpsons are invited to a dinner with Mr. Burns, where Bart and Lisa discover that Mr. Burns is a vampire.
87	6	"Marge on the Lam"	Mark Kirkland	Bill Canterbury	November 4, 1993	1F03	21.7
Marge and neighbor Ruth Powers have a girls' night. Meanwhile, Homer tries to have fun without Marge and Lionel Hutz is hired as Bart, Lisa, and Maggie's babysitter. Homer hitches a ride home with Chief Wiggum, who is following behind Marge and Ruth and decides to pull them over. However, Ruth speeds her car up and reveals to Marge that she stole it from her ex-husband. Marge decides to stay with Ruth, but eventually the police catch up with them and the charges are dismissed.
88	7	"Bart's Inner Child"	Bob Anderson	George Meyer	November 11, 1993	1F05	18.7
Marge realizes that she is no fun because of her constant nagging and seeks help from self-help guru Brad Goodman, who then uses Bart's irreverent attitude as a new example of how people should behave. The entire town of Springfield begins to act like Bart, who at first enjoys things but begins to feel that his role as a troublemaker is usurped. During the inaugural "Do what you feel" festival, several things go wrong and the town decides to stop acting like Bart.
89	8	"Boy-Scoutz 'n the Hood"	Jeffrey Lynch	Dan McGrath	November 18, 1993	1F06	20.1
Bart and Milhouse find $20.00 on the street and buy a Squishee made entirely of syrup. After a night of bingeing and carousing, Bart wakes up to discover that he has joined a Boy Scouts-esque troupe called "The Junior Campers". Bart initially hates the group, then enjoys it, until Homer agrees to participate in their river-rafting trip. In a boat with Ned and Rod Flanders, Homer loses their map and the boat gets lost in the ocean. After being stuck out at sea for a week, they discover an offshore oil rig with a Krusty Burger and are saved. At the end of the episode, the rest of the campers including Ernest Borgnine are attacked by an unknown monster at an abandoned campsite. Guest star: Ernest Borgnine
90	9	"The Last Temptation of Homer"	Carlos Baeza	Frank Mula	December 9, 1993	1F07	20.6
Mr. Burns hires a female worker named Mindy Simmons in accordance with government policy and Homer is worried that his crush on her will ruin his marriage with Marge. Both Mindy and Homer have feelings for each other, but in the end Homer decides not to cheat on Marge. Meanwhile, Bart becomes a nerd after doctors find several things physically wrong with him and apply treatments that make him look like a nerd. Guest star: Michelle Pfeiffer
91	10	"$pringfield (or, How I Learned to Stop; Worrying and Love Legalized Gambling)"	Wes Archer	Bill Oakley & Josh Weinstein	December 16, 1993	1F08	17.9
After the local economy stalls, everyone in town votes for gambling to be legalized, prompting Mr. Burns to open a casino. Homer becomes a blackjack dealer, and Marge becomes so addicted to gambling that she forgets about her family life. Meanwhile, Bart opens up his own casino after being kicked out of Mr. Burns's and Lisa struggles to have her costume done for a school pageant. Homer agrees to help her, but does a terrible job, so he decides to go to the casino to get Marge back. Guest stars: Gerry Cooney and Robert Goulet
92	11	"Homer the Vigilante"	Jim Reardon	John Swartzwelder	January 6, 1994	1F09	20.1
A crime wave hits Springfield, caused by the elusive cat burglar and Lisa's saxophone is stolen, so Homer agrees to try to get it back. The police are ineffective, so Flanders creates a neighborhood watch group, which Homer takes charge of. However, Homer's incompetence causes the vigilante group to commit more crimes than it prevents, and they are unsuccessful in catching the cat burglar. With the help of Grampa, Homer discovers that the burglar is a charming senior named Malloy. Malloy is arrested, but he tricks the citizens of Springfield into thinking he has hidden millions of dollars and escapes during the ensuing rush to find the money.
93	12	"Bart Gets Famous"	Susie Dietter	John Swartzwelder	February 3, 1994	1F11	20.0
After sneaking away from a school trip to a box factory, Bart sneaks onto the set of the Krusty the Clown show. He gets a job as Krusty's production assistant and soon becomes sick of the job. One day, he is close to quitting, but Krusty runs up and says he needs to use Bart in a sketch. Bart becomes an accidental star when he says, "I didn't do it" during the botched sketch. He becomes famous but soon becomes tired of being known for one line. Marge convinces him that the main thing is to make people happy, so Bart decides to continue, but the audience soon becomes tired of Bart's act and forget about him. Guest star: Conan O'Brien
94	13	"Homer and Apu"	Mark Kirkland	Greg Daniels	February 10, 1994	1F10	21.8
After twice getting food poisoning from expired food sold at the Kwik-E-Mart, Homer teams up with Kent Brockman to report Apu. Apu is fired from his job and comes to stay with the Simpsons, and he is replaced by actor James Woods. Homer resolves to help Apu get his old job back, and the two travel to India to talk to the owner of the Kwik-E-Mart, but are unsuccessful. Apu decides to visit his old Kwik-E-Mart and saves James Woods's life. Woods is so grateful that he helps Apu get rehired. Guest star: James Woods
95	14	"Lisa vs. Malibu Stacy"	Jeffrey Lynch	Bill Oakley & Josh Weinstein	February 17, 1994	1F12	19.9
Lisa protests against the phrases on her new Talking Malibu Stacy doll, which she finds demeaning to women. She tracks down the reclusive creator Stacy to make a more politically correct doll. Meanwhile, Grampa is worried that he is getting old, so he takes a job at Krusty Burger. Lisa and Stacy create "Lisa Lionheart" which gets a lot of positive buzz, but is a flop when the Malibu Stacy executives release a new doll that comes with a hat. Guest star: Kathleen Turner
96	15	"Deep Space Homer"	Carlos Baeza	David Mirkin	February 24, 1994	1F13	18.2
NASA decides that they need to hire average joes in order to get higher television ratings. They recruit Homer and Barney to train to be the first average American in space. Homer, who wants to be respected, is the winner by default, and goes into space with Buzz Aldrin. While there, he causes a lot of havoc and eventually breaks the handle on the space shuttle's hatch. Homer inadvertently seals the door shut with an inanimate carbon rod, and the shuttle returns to Earth. The rod is hailed as a hero, but Homer gains the respect of Aldrin and his family.
97	16	"Homer Loves Flanders"	Wes Archer	David Richardson	March 17, 1994	1F14	18.0
Homer begins to like Flanders after being invited to a football game. However, Homer's constant presence around Flanders and his family causes Ned to feel hate for Homer. One day while trying to drive away from Homer, Flanders is arrested and charged with drunk driving. Flanders begins to lose the respect of the church congregation until Homer sticks up for him. Flanders thanks Homer and the two remain friends.
98	17	"Bart Gets an Elephant"	Jim Reardon	John Swartzwelder	March 31, 1994	1F15	17.0
While stuck cleaning the house, Bart wins a radio contest and chooses a gag prize, an elephant, instead of the real prize, $10,000 cash. The radio station eventually gets Bart his elephant, which is named Stampy. When taking care of Stampy gets too expensive Homer decides to sell him to an ivory dealer rather than turn him over to a non-profit Animal Refuge. Bart tries to run away with Stampy, but the elephant escapes. They track him down, and Homer agrees to give him to the Animal Refuge.
99	18	"Burns' Heir"	Mark Kirkland	Jace Richdale	April 14, 1994	1F16	14.7
Mr. Burns has a near-death experience which prompts him to find an heir to inherit his wealth after he dies. Bart is rejected, but Burns soon decides to choose him after seeing that Bart is "a creature of pure malevolence". Marge convinces Bart to go spend some time with Burns, and soon becomes more disruptive than normal to his own family and decides to go live with Mr. Burns. Bart eventually starts to miss his family, but Burns manipulates him into staying. Burns tries to have Bart prove his loyalty by firing Homer, but Bart instead decides to go back to living with his family.
100	19	"Sweet Seymour Skinner's Baadasssss Song"	Bob Anderson	Bill Oakley & Josh Weinstein	April 28, 1994	1F18	19.7
Bart accidentally gets Principal Skinner fired after he brings Santa's Little Helper to school for show and tell. Bart feels guilty for what he did, and befriends Skinner. Meanwhile, Ned Flanders is hired as principal and the school goes to pot. Bart decides that while he enjoys having Skinner as a friend, he needs him as an enemy, but discovers that he returned to the Army to be a sergeant. Bart convinces Skinner to return and they get Flanders fired so that Skinner can get his old job back. Note: This is the show's 100th episode.
101	20	"The Boy Who Knew Too Much"	Jeffrey Lynch	John Swartzwelder	May 5, 1994	1F19	15.5
Bart plays hooky from school and ends up at the birthday party of Freddy Quimby, the Mayor's nephew, where Freddy is accused of assaulting a waiter. Bart knows the truth, but would have to admit that he was playing hooky if he testifies. Meanwhile, Homer is chosen for jury duty in the assault case against Freddy Quimby and takes advantage of being sequestered in a hotel.
102	21	"Lady Bouvier's Lover"	Wes Archer	Bill Oakley & Josh Weinstein	May 12, 1994	1F21	15.1
While attending Maggie's first birthday party, Grampa falls for Marge's mother Jacqueline. Grampa and Jacqueline start dating, but he is soon pushed aside in favor of Mr. Burns. Mr. Burns and Jacqueline are soon engaged to be married, much to the chagrin of Marge and Smithers. Grampa crashes the wedding and tries to get Jacqueline back, but she decides that she does not want to be married. Meanwhile, Bart steals Homer's credit card to buy a piece of Itchy and Scratchy memorabilia that turns out to be a rip-off.
103	22	"Secrets of a Successful Marriage"	Carlos Baeza	Greg Daniels	May 19, 1994	1F20	15.6
Tired of being called "slow," Homer signs up to teach a class on keeping a successful marriage at a learning annex. He is an unsuccessful teacher and finds that the only way he can keep the class interested is to tell racy secrets about Marge and their bedroom antics. Marge soon gets fed up with Homer telling their secrets and kicks him out. Homer starts living in Bart's treehouse and becomes so lost without Marge that he begs her to take him back, and she eventually agrees.

== DVD release ==
The menu for the first disc of The Complete Fifth Season; the new format of menus has since been used in the rest of the released season box sets

The DVD boxset for season five was released by 20th Century Fox Home Entertainment in the United States and Canada on December 21, 2004, ten years after it had completed broadcast on television. As well as every episode from the season, the DVD release features bonus material including deleted scenes, animatics, and commentaries for every episode. The menus are a different format than the previous seasons, and that format would be used in every set after. It is the last box set that features the Simpson family on television.

The Complete Fifth Season
Set details			Special features
22 episodes; 4-disc set; 1.33:1 aspect ratio; AUDIO; English 5.1 Dolby Digital; Spanish 2.0 Dolby Surround; French 2.0 Dolby Surround; SUBTITLES; English SDH; Spanish			Optional commentaries for all 22 episodes; Introduction from Matt Groening; Animation Showcases; "A Look Back" with James L. Brooks; Deleted Scenes; Homer's Barbershop Quartet; Cape Feare; Homer Goes to College; Rosebud; Treehouse of Horror IV; The Last Temptation of Homer; $pringfield; Homer the Vigilante; Bart Gets Famous; Homer and Apu; Homer Loves Flanders; Burns' Heir; Sweet Seymour Skinner's Baadasssss Song; The Boy Who Knew Too Much; Special Language Feature; Sweet Seymour Skinner's Baadasssss Song; Czech 2.0 Dolby Surround; Polish 2.0 Dolby Surround; Hungarian 2.0 Dolby Surround; Italian 2.0 Dolby Surround; Commercials; Butterfinger - I've Been Robbed; Butterfinger - Crime of the Century; T.G.I. Friday's - Homer Simpson; Ramada Inn - Ramada's In; THX Trailer; Illustrated commentaries; Audio outtakes; Original sketches
Release dates
Region 1	Region 2	Region 4	
December 21, 2004	March 21, 2005	March 23, 2005	
