= Homer the Vigilante =

- The Simpsons episode
- Episode no.: Season 5 Episode 11
- Directed by: Jim Reardon
- Written by: John Swartzwelder
- Production code: 1F09
- Original air date: January 6, 1994

Guest appearance
- Sam Neill as Molloy

Episode features
- Chalkboard gag: "I am not authorized to fire substitute teachers"
- Couch gag: The Simpsons run in and explode on contact, with Maggie's pacifier falling onto the blackened crater.
- Commentary: Matt Groening; David Mirkin; David Silverman

Episode chronology
← Previous "$pringfield (or, How I Learned to Stop Worrying and Love Legalized Gambling)"	Next → "Bart Gets Famous"
- The Simpsons season 5

"Homer the Vigilante" is the eleventh episode of the fifth season of the American animated television series The Simpsons. It originally aired on the Fox network in the United States on January 6, 1994. In the episode, a crime wave caused by an elusive cat burglar plagues Springfield. Lisa is distraught when her saxophone is stolen, and Homer promises to get it back. The police are ineffective, so Homer takes charge of a neighborhood watch. Under his leadership, it becomes a vigilante group which fails to catch the burglar. With the help of Grampa, Homer discovers that the burglar is a charming senior named Molloy. Molloy is arrested, but he outwits the citizens of Springfield and escapes.

The episode was written by John Swartzwelder and directed by Jim Reardon. Sam Neill guest starred in the episode as Molloy. "Homer the Vigilante" was selected for release in a 1997 video collection of selected episodes titled: The Simpsons: Crime and Punishment. It features cultural references to films such as It's a Mad, Mad, Mad, Mad World and Dr. Strangelove.

Since airing, the episode has received positive reviews from television critics. It acquired a Nielsen rating of 12.2, and was the highest-rated show on the Fox network the week it aired.

== Plot ==
One night, the Simpson family's house is robbed by a cat burglar while the family sleeps; the next morning, the family finds out that several other houses in Springfield have been robbed. The town's residents arm themselves and install security devices to thwart the burglar, which include giant mechanical legs that cause houses to break off from their foundations and run away, before setting itself on fire. A neighborhood watch group is formed and Homer is elected as its leader. The street patrol soon devolves into a vigilante group whose members violate laws instead of catching criminals. When Homer is interviewed on news anchor Kent Brockman's Smartline, the cat burglar calls into the show and taunts Homer, causing him to inadvertently strangle the stage manager out of rage. The cat burglar reveals he plans to steal the world's largest cubic zirconia from the Springfield museum.

Homer's posse guards the museum, refusing the help of Grampa, who is accompanied by Jasper and Molloy, two of his friends from the Springfield Retirement Castle. After Homer spots a group of teenagers drinking beer, he leaves his post to intervene, but gets drunk with them instead. When the cat burglar subsequently steals the zirconia, Homer is blamed and pelted with fruits and vegetables by the unforgiving townspeople. Later, Grampa deduces that Molloy is the cat burglar and tells his family. Homer captures Molloy at the Retirement Castle, and the surprisingly amiable cat burglar returns the objects he stole. Nevertheless, Chief Wiggum arrests and imprisons Molloy.

At the police station, Molloy tells Homer and the police officers that he has hidden a large amount of stolen money under a giant "T" somewhere in Springfield. Homer and the police officers abruptly leave the station, hoping to find the buried treasure; the commotion attracts dozens of other Springfield residents, who then become determined to find the treasure themselves. After checking several possible sites, the crowd returns to get more information from Molloy, who directs them to a large, T-shaped palm tree on the outskirts of town. The residents excavate the site, but find only a box containing a note from Molloy; he lied about the treasure in order to buy himself enough time to escape from his cell. Several citizens continue to dig, hoping that there is a real treasure, but soon find themselves at a loss for ways to get out of the hole they have made.

== Production ==
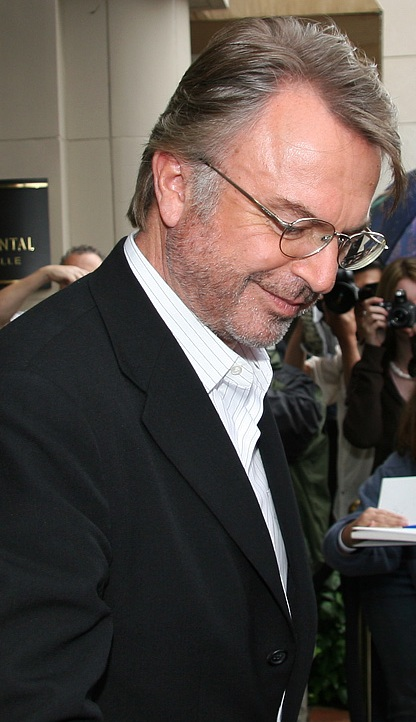
Sam Neill guest starred in the episode as Molloy.

The episode was written by John Swartzwelder and directed by Jim Reardon. New Zealand actor Sam Neill guest starred in the episode as Molloy, the cat burglar. Executive producer David Mirkin thought Neill, a big Simpsons fan, was "lovely" to direct. Mirkin also said Neill was "really game" and did "a terrific job". Neill considered this episode to be a "high-point" of his career. One scene features Kent Brockman reporting on the burglaries. Mirkin said this was a joke the staff enjoyed doing because it pointed out how negative and mean-spirited news broadcasts can be, and how they are seemingly "always trying to scare everybody" by creating panic and depression.

== Cultural references ==
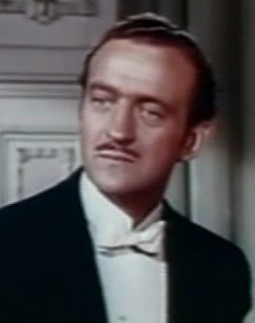
David Niven (1950)

Molloy is based on David Niven's character A. J. Raffles, a gentleman thief, in Raffles (1939). The music heard during the burglaries is from The Pink Panther (1963), in which Niven played a similar character, The Phantom. Flanders tells Homer that his Shroud of Turin beach towels were stolen during one of the burglaries. Herman Hermann shows Homer a bomb the military developed to drop on Beatniks. Homer's dream of riding the bomb to oblivion is a parody of the climactic scene of Dr. Strangelove or: How I Learned to Stop Worrying and Love the Bomb (1964). The poem recited by the beatnik in Homer's dream is similar to Allen Ginsberg's "Howl", containing some of the same words. Homer's line, "Take that Maynard G. Krebs!" is a reference to the Beatnik character from The Many Loves of Dobie Gillis. Homer's line, "So I said, look buddy, your car was upside-down when I got here. And as for your grandma, she shouldn't have mouthed off like that!" is a reference to Flannery O'Connor's short story "A Good Man Is Hard to Find". The scene of Homer and Principal Skinner talking in front of the museum is a reference to Dragnet; the show's theme plays in the scene. In a reference to the plot of It's a Mad, Mad, Mad, Mad World (1963), Molloy sends the residents of Springfield on a hunt for a treasure that is buried under a big letter. The ending sequence references the film by using the same music and camera angles. In another scene that references It's a Mad, Mad, Mad, Mad World, Bart tricks a character modelled after the one played by American actor Phil Silvers into driving his car into a river.

== Reception ==
In its original broadcast, "Homer the Vigilante" finished 41st in the ratings for the week of January 3–9, 1994, with a Nielsen rating of 12.2, equivalent to approximately 11.5 million viewing households. It was the highest-rated show on the Fox network that week.

Since airing, the episode has received mostly positive reviews from television critics. The authors of the book I Can't Believe It's a Bigger and Better Updated Unofficial Simpsons Guide, Gary Russell and Gareth Roberts, thought it was "a bit lacking in focus", but it contained "a number of satisfying set-pieces — we like Professor Frink's walking house security system — and displays Wiggum at his all-time most useless."

DVD Movie Guide's Colin Jacobson wrote: "After the many plots of the prior show, 'Vigilante' maintains a much tighter focus. It’s nothing quite as wonderful an episode as its immediate predecessor, but it’s strong nonetheless. Much of the humor comes from Homer’s newfound power and abuse of it. If nothing else, it’s a great program due to Homer’s reaction to Lisa’s jug playing."

Patrick Bromley of DVD Verdict gave the episode a grade of B, and Bill Gibron of DVD Talk gave it a score of 4 out of 5.

Les Winan of Box Office Prophets named "Homer the Vigilante", "Cape Feare", "Homer Goes to College", "$pringfield (or, How I Learned to Stop Worrying and Love Legalized Gambling)", and "Deep Space Homer" his favorite episodes of season five.

It was also the Liverpool Daily Post's Mike Chapple's favorite episode of the season, together with "Bart Gets an Elephant" and "Burns' Heir".
