= Lady Bouvier's Lover =

- The Simpsons episode
- Episode no.: Season 5 Episode 21
- Directed by: Wesley Archer
- Written by: Bill Oakley; Josh Weinstein
- Production code: 1F21
- Original air date: May 12, 1994

Guest appearance
- Phil Hartman as Troy McClure

Episode features
- Chalkboard gag: "I will not re-transmit without the express permission of Major League Baseball"
- Couch gag: The family runs to the couch, but when they get there, they break and shatter like glass. Santa's Little Helper enters the room confused.
- Commentary: Matt Groening; David Mirkin; Bill Oakley; Josh Weinstein; Wes Archer

Episode chronology
← Previous "The Boy Who Knew Too Much"	Next → "Secrets of a Successful Marriage"
- The Simpsons season 5

"Lady Bouvier's Lover" is the twenty-first and penultimate episode of the fifth season of the American animated television series The Simpsons. It originally aired on the Fox network in the United States on May 12, 1994. In the episode, Abe Simpson falls in love with Marge's mother, Jacqueline Bouvier, and they start dating. However, on a night out in town, she is charmed by Mr. Burns. Abe is brokenhearted when he learns that Jacqueline is going to marry Mr. Burns.

The episode was written by Bill Oakley and Josh Weinstein, and directed by Wes Archer. It was recorded in October 1993 at the Darryl F. Zanuck Building on the 20th Century Fox lot in West Los Angeles. The episode features cultural references to films such as The Gold Rush and The Graduate, and songs such as "Moonlight Serenade" and "Sing, Sing, Sing".

Since airing, the episode has received mixed reviews from television critics. It acquired a Nielsen rating of 10.0, and was the third highest-rated show on the Fox network the week it aired.

== Plot ==
The Simpson family gathers to celebrate Maggie's birthday. After the party, Grampa feels depressed, so Marge sets him up for a date with her mother, Jacqueline. Eventually, the couple falls in love, which enrages Homer, who believes that old people should not date each other — especially in-laws — and fears that his children will become "freaks" if the two decide to marry.

To impress Jacqueline, Grampa takes her out dancing, but when he does, Mr. Burns steals her from him and breaks his heart. They soon fall in love, and Jacqueline later agrees to marry Burns, to Marge's chagrin. Meanwhile, Bart buys a $350 Itchy & Scratchy animation cel with one of Homer's credit cards, which turns out to be poor quality with only part of Scratchy's arm drawn. Bart tries to trade it to Comic Book Guy for money but is offered a telephone in the shape of Mary Worth instead. In order to pay Homer back, Bart blackmails Burns by threatening to ruin his suit before his date.

On the day of the wedding, Grampa crashes Burns's and Jacqueline's wedding ceremony and asks that Jacqueline marry him instead. Partly due to Burns's behavior, especially when he threatens Bart after he accidentally drops the wedding rings, she decides not to marry either man. Grampa accepts Jacqueline's decision.

== Production ==
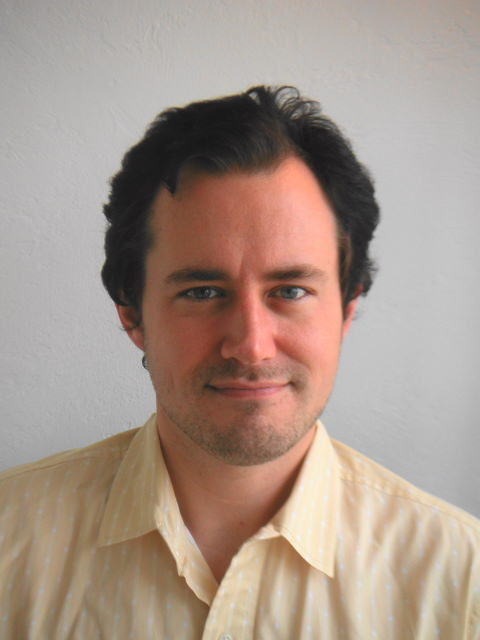
Bill Oakley was one of the episode's writers.

"Lady Bouvier's Lover" was written by Bill Oakley and Josh Weinstein, and directed by Wes Archer. The episode was inspired by the fact that The Simpsons has many elderly characters, which the writers felt was unique for network television, so they sought to highlight those characters. Originally, the episode was supposed to be about Misery. One of the ideas was that Grampa would get injured on Mr. Burns's property and get stuck there, leading Grampa to think that Mr. Burns would kill him when he was discovered there. However, this idea was cut out in production because the script was over 85 pages long.

The episode was recorded at the Darryl F. Zanuck Building on the 20th Century Fox lot in West Los Angeles, where the cast and crew of The Simpsons gathered on a Monday morning in October 1993. Before the recording session took part, the main voice actors of the show (Dan Castellaneta, Harry Shearer, Julie Kavner, Yeardley Smith, Nancy Cartwright, and Hank Azaria) sat down with executive producer David Mirkin and a crew of writers at a table reading to determine what shape the script was in. There was "genuine hearty laughter at various points" during the script run-through, said Ray Richmond, a reporter for the Los Angeles Daily News. Immediately after the reading, the crew of writers hurried to make script changes based on what got laughs and what did not, while the actors waited impatiently. Mirkin told Richmond that the script would require the equivalent of ten rewrites: "At every step, there are amendments and additions and refinements." Richmond commented that as the recording session started, the "astounding versatility" of the actors became clear; "Castellaneta bounces from being Homer to Grampa to Barney without taking a breath and minus any evident vocal similarities." Mirkin said the episode was also a tour de force for Kavner, who in one scene voices Marge, Marge's two sisters, and Marge's mother. He added that even though she enjoyed the process, it was tough on Kavner's voice because those characters talk with "gravelly voices".

== Cultural references ==
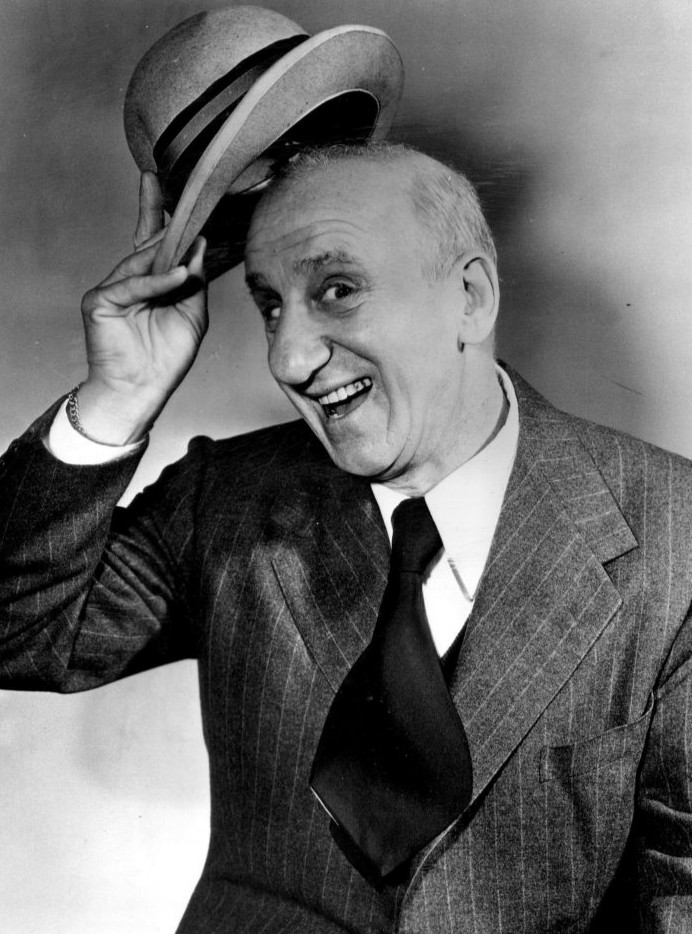
Grampa is hassled by lawyers who claim that he is imitating Jimmy Durante.

The episode's title is a play on D. H. Lawrence's novel Lady Chatterley's Lover (1928). Grampa is hassled twice by lawyers representing the estates of deceased entertainers: first for imitating Charlie Chaplin's bread roll dance scene from The Gold Rush (1925), and the second for imitating Jimmy Durante. Grampa banging on the church window while shouting "Mrs. Bouvier!", and the subsequent getaway on the bus, are references to The Graduate (1967), as is the closing song, a parody of "The Sound of Silence" by Simon and Garfunkel. Mrs. Bouvier says her friends Zelda Fitzgerald, Frances Farmer and Sylvia Plath were jealous of her good looks and it drove them crazy. All three women were known for having been institutionalized, Fitzgerald and Farmer for schizophrenia and Plath for a breakdown that resulted in suicide. Mrs. Bouvier's favorite tune—played during the dance at the Springfield Community Center and later by Grampa at the wedding—is Glenn Miller's "Moonlight Serenade". The swing tune played during Mrs. Bouvier and Mr. Burns's dance is "Sing, Sing, Sing", written by Louis Prima and performed by Benny Goodman. Bart and Lisa sing the 1960s advertising jingle used for Armour and Company's brand of hot dogs. Everyone, except Lisa, then sings the advertising jingle for Chicken Tonight, complete with chicken dance moves. Bart receives a Mary Worth telephone after unsuccessfully trying to get his money back for the Itchy and Scratchy cel he purchased.

== Reception ==
=== Ratings ===
In its original American broadcast, "Lady Bouvier's Lover" finished 50th in the ratings for the week of May 9 to May 15, 1994, with a Nielsen rating of 10.0. The episode was the third highest-rated show on the Fox network that week, following Beverly Hills, 90210 and Melrose Place.

=== Critical reception ===
Since airing, the episode has received mixed reviews from television critics.

DVD Movie Guide's Colin Jacobson called the episode a "generally good program, though not one of the year's best". Jacobson said he dislikes Marge's mother; "she's one of the series' less interesting characters, which is probably why she appears so rarely." However, he thinks Grampa is "always fun", and "it's nice to see him in an ebullient mood, at least for a while." Patrick Bromley of DVD Verdict gave the episode a B− grade and said he is "never terribly interested in episodes that revolve around [Grampa] Simpson". He believes Grampa is "great as a background character, but less so when he takes center stage". He added: "I'm also especially uninterested in episodes revolving around Marge's mother. Having said that, this episode does have a number of inspired moments—notably the subplot involving Bart's pursuit of an Itchy & Scratchy cel, as well as one of the series' many homages to The Graduate." Bill Gibron of DVD Talk gave the episode a score of 4 out of 5.

The authors of I Can't Believe It's a Bigger and Better Updated Unofficial Simpsons Guide, Gary Russell and Gareth Roberts, wrote: "Homer's nightmare vision of Bart, Lisa and Maggie as ordinary kids is a highlight of this especially crazy—surreal jokes, flashbacks and dream sequences whizz by at an alarming rate—installment."
