= Rosebud (The Simpsons) =

- The Simpsons episode
- Promotional image for the episode, depicting Homer with the Ramones
- Episode no.: Season 5 Episode 4
- Directed by: Wesley Archer
- Written by: John Swartzwelder
- Production code: 1F01
- Original air date: October 21, 1993

Guest appearances
- The Ramones (Joey Ramone, Johnny Ramone, C. J. Ramone and Marky Ramone) as themselves

Episode features
- Couch gag: The family finds identical copies of themselves sitting on the couch.
- Commentary: Matt Groening; David Mirkin; Wes Archer; David Silverman

Episode chronology
← Previous "Homer Goes to College"	Next → "Treehouse of Horror IV"
- The Simpsons season 5

"Rosebud" is the fourth episode of the fifth season of the American animated television series The Simpsons. It first aired on the Fox network in the United States on October 21, 1993. In the episode, Mr. Burns misses his childhood teddy bear Bobo on the eve of his birthday. After flashbacks reveal Bobo's journey through history, the bear ends up in the hands of Maggie Simpson, before Burns does everything in his power to get Bobo back.

"Rosebud" was directed by Wes Archer and written by John Swartzwelder. It was the first episode to be executive-produced by David Mirkin, who was the show runner for the fifth and sixth seasons of the show. Supervising director David Silverman describes the episode as "one of the more challenging ones" to direct. The Ramones (Joey Ramone, Johnny Ramone, C. J. Ramone and Marky Ramone) guest-star in the episode as themselves. The episode is largely a parody of the 1941 film Citizen Kane and the title references Charles Foster Kane's dying word "Rosebud". The episode contains references to The Wizard of Oz, Planet of the Apes, Barney & Friends, George Burns, Charles Lindbergh, The Rolling Stones and Adolf Hitler.

Since airing, “Rosebud" has received universal acclaim from fans and television critics. In 2003, Entertainment Weekly placed the episode in second place on their list of the 25 best episodes of The Simpsons.

== Plot ==
Mr. Burns dreams about his early childhood, when he lived with his family and cherished his teddy bear Bobo, which he dropped in the snow when he left home to live with a "twisted, loveless billionaire". Bobo was found by Charles Lindbergh, then by Adolf Hitler, then by ice cutters in the North Pole. Burns becomes so obsessed with finding Bobo that he cannot enjoy the elaborate birthday celebration Smithers has arranged for him. After the Ramones perform a disdainful rendition of "Happy Birthday To You", and employee Homer Simpson performs a loutish, derisive stand-up routine, Burns becomes infuriated, ordering Smithers to have the Ramones killed (mistakenly calling them the Rolling Stones) and has his security guards break up the party. Bart buys a bag of ice to heal a head injury Homer received at the party. Bart finds Bobo in the bag and gives him to Maggie to play with.

When Homer realizes Maggie is playing with Bobo, he negotiates a deal with Burns to exchange Bobo for "a million dollars and three Hawaiian Islands - the good ones, not the leper ones". However, Maggie refuses to give up Bobo, and Homer calls off the deal. Burns is outraged and promises vengeance unless he gets Bobo back. After several failed attempts to steal the bear, Burns subjects Homer to harsh work at the nuclear power plant. Additionally, Burns explains through a television broadcast that he is cutting off Springfield's beer supply and hijacking its television channels as a way of extorting Homer.

Wanting their beer and TV back, an angry mob of townspeople soon attempt to take Bobo themselves, but are coaxed into giving Bobo back to Maggie when they see her sad face. Homer tells Burns that Bobo belongs to Maggie now, and she refuses to give up Bobo even after Burns attempts to directly take him from her. Seeing how distraught Burns is, Maggie lets him have Bobo. He is overcome with joy and promises to be nice to everyone; however, since Smithers is unable to get Burns's statement in writing, it is implied Burns will soon forget it. Homer is disappointed that the Simpson family did not get a reward even though Burns got Bobo back. He asks Marge: "Is this a happy ending or a sad ending?" Marge cryptically replies "it's an ending. That's enough."

In an epilogue taking place during the year 1,000,000 AD, the Earth is a wasteland ruled by intelligent apes who have seemingly enslaved the remnants of humanity (all of whom strongly resemble Homer); the apes unearth a fossilized Bobo. Burns — with his head in a jar attached to a cybernetic body — snatches Bobo from an ape and vows to never again leave the bear behind, running off into the sunset with Smithers, whose head is attached to a robotic dog's body.

== Production ==
"Rosebud" was written by John Swartzwelder and was the first episode to be executive produced and run by David Mirkin. Mirkin enjoyed working on the episode so much that he spent "an enormous amount of time on post production" experimenting with various elements of the episode. Originally, the backstory for Bobo included several much darker scenes, including one where the bear was involved in the assassination of John F. Kennedy. The scenes were cut because the writers felt it was in bad taste. The ending of the episode was originally longer, but two segments were cut. The first saw Washington D.C. destroyed by invading Canadian troops, who found Bobo. The second featured the entire planet being overrun by giant redwoods and spotted owls.

David Silverman describes the episode as "one of the more challenging ones" to direct. Guest stars the Ramones were "gigantic, obsessive Simpsons fans" and their characters were designed by Wes Archer. Drummer Marky Ramone later called their appearance "a career highlight".

== Cultural references ==
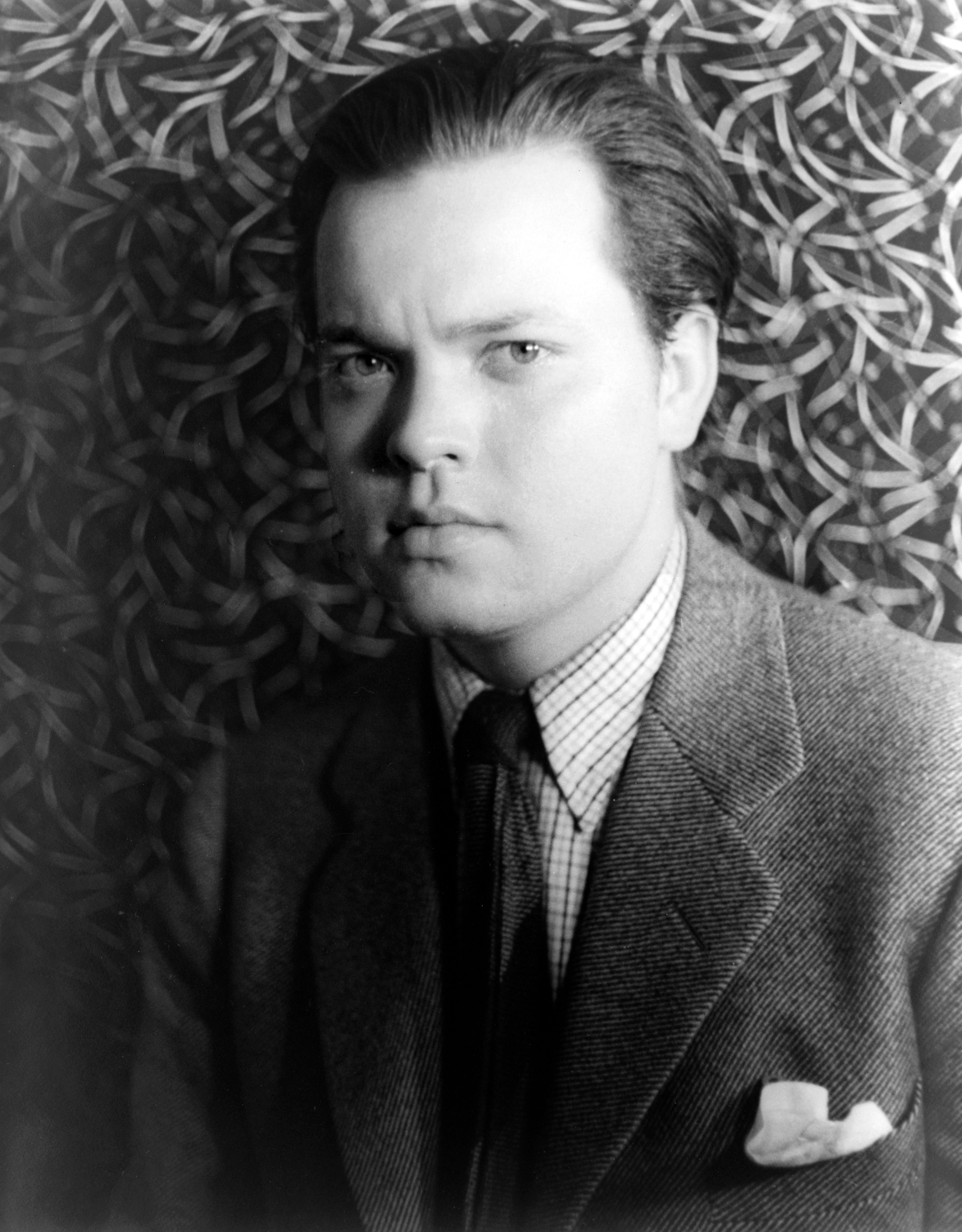
Much of the episode is a parody of the Orson Welles film Citizen Kane.

The episode is largely a parody of Orson Welles' Citizen Kane (1941). The title is a reference to Charles Foster Kane's dying word, "Rosebud". The teddy bear Bobo is a substitute for Rosebud in this episode; the young Burns discards it in the snow when offered a new life of riches and power. The scene where he drops a snow globe while whispering the name of his lost toy parodies Kane's death scene at the start of the film. Smithers fantasising about Mr. Burns singing "Happy Birthday" to him is a reference to Marilyn Monroe, who famously sang the song to John F. Kennedy shortly before their deaths. The guards outside Burns's manor have the same chant as the Wicked Witch of the West's guards in The Wizard of Oz (1939). After the Ramones' performance, Burns orders Smithers to "have The Rolling Stones killed". Smithers reminds Burns of his possessions: "King Arthur's Excalibur, the only existing nude photo of Mark Twain, that rare first draft of the Constitution with the word 'suckers' in it..." In his imaginary recording studio, Homer records the 'Two All-beef Patties' jingle which lists the ingredients of a Big Mac.

Burns and Smithers' attempt to steal Bobo from the Simpsons mirrors Mission: Impossible, and their sitcom is similar to The Honeymooners. Both Mr. Burns and Homer make references to the cancellation of the TV series The Misadventures of Sheriff Lobo. Mr. Burns' brother is revealed to be comedian George Burns, and both Charles Lindbergh and Adolf Hitler were once in possession of Bobo. The last scene where Mr. Burns's robotic body runs off with Bobo is a reference to the film Planet of the Apes.

== Reception ==
In its original American broadcast, "Rosebud" finished 33rd in the ratings for the week of October 18–24, 1993. It acquired a Nielsen rating of 11.9. The episode was the second highest-rated show on the Fox network that week after Married... with Children.

In 2003, Entertainment Weekly's placed "Rosebud" second on their top 25 The Simpsons episode list, writing that "It begins with 'Citizen Kane,' ends somewhere near the 'Planet of the Apes,' and in between, manages to find time to include Hitler, the Ramones, and 64 slices of American cheese. But despite being one of The Simpsons' most spectacularly overstuffed episodes, 'Rosebud' has plenty of heart". In 2007, Vanity Fair named it the best episode of the show, calling it, "A perfect episode. Mr. Burns's lamentations for his childhood bear, Bobo, lead to a show-long parody of Citizen Kane. At once a satire and a tribute, the episode manages to both humanize Mr. Burns and delve deep into Homer's love for his oft-forgotten second daughter, Maggie." In 2019, Time ranked the episode tenth in its list of 10 best Simpsons episodes picked by Simpsons experts. In his book Planet Simpson, author Chris Turner listed "Rosebud" as one of his five favorite episodes of The Simpsons, calling the episode "genius". He added that the Ramones gave "possibly the finest guest musical performances ever."

David Silverman and Matt Groening describe the sequence where Homer eats 64 slices of American cheese as "one of the most hilarious segments ever done". When The Simpsons began streaming on Disney+ in 2019, former Simpsons writer and executive producer Bill Oakley named this one of the best classic Simpsons episodes to watch on the service.

The episode's reference to Citizen Kane was named the 14th greatest film reference in the history of the show by Total Film's Nathan Ditum. IGN ranked The Ramones's performance as the fifteenth best guest appearance in the show's history.

In a retrospective review for The A.V. Club in 2012, Nathan Rabin wrote that those who had watched Citizen Kane would have enjoyed the episode more, while noting that many jokes and scenes were not connected to the film. He concluded that "As the first episode of Mirkin’s term as showrunner, 'Rosebud' established an almost impossibly high standard the rest of the season remarkably maintained."
