= Bart's Inner Child =

- The Simpsons episode
- Episode no.: Season 5 Episode 7
- Directed by: Bob Anderson
- Written by: George Meyer
- Production code: 1F05
- Original air date: November 11, 1993

Guest appearances
- James Brown as himself; Phil Hartman as Troy McClure; Marcia Wallace as Mrs. Krabappel; Albert Brooks as Brad Goodman (credited as A. Brooks)

Episode features
- Couch gag: The Simpsons squeeze onto the couch next to an obese man.
- Commentary: Matt Groening; David Mirkin; Dan Castellaneta; Yeardley Smith; George Meyer; Bob Anderson; David Silverman

Episode chronology
← Previous "Marge on the Lam"	Next → "Boy-Scoutz 'n the Hood"
- The Simpsons season 5

"Bart's Inner Child" is the seventh episode of the fifth season of the American animated television series The Simpsons and its 88th episode overall. It originally aired on Fox in the US on November 11, 1993. In the episode, Marge seeks help from self-help guru Brad Goodman after concluding that she nags too much. He praises Bart's irreverent attitude and encourages his followers to emulate Bart's care-free antics. Soon everyone in Springfield starts to act like Bart, who feels that his role as a troublemaker is usurped. After the inaugural "Do What You Feel Festival" ends in calamity and a riot as a result, the town decides to stop acting like Bart.

The episode was written by George Meyer and was the first episode directed by Bob Anderson. Actor Albert Brooks guest stars in the episode as Brad Goodman, a self-help guru modelled after John Bradshaw. It was Brooks' third of ten appearances in the Simpsons franchise. Singer James Brown guest stars as himself; he sings his 1965 song "I Got You (I Feel Good)". In 2006, Brooks was named the best Simpsons guest star by IGN, while Brown's appearance has been described as "hilariously over-the-top".

The episode features cultural references to several films, television shows, and songs, including the 1939 film Gone with the Wind, Scott Joplin's piano rag "The Entertainer", and the Wile E. Coyote and Road Runner cartoons.

In its original broadcast, "Bart's Inner Child" finished 40th in the weekly ratings with a Nielsen rating of 11.8, and was viewed in 11.12 million households.

== Plot ==
Homer sees a newspaper advertisement for a free trampoline, that he rushes to get from Krusty the Clown. Bart and Lisa are thrilled, but Marge fears it may be dangerous. Homer ignores her fretting and charges neighbors a fee to use it. When scores of people are injured, Homer heeds Marge's advice to get rid of the trampoline. After several failed attempts to dispose of it, Bart suggests chaining it to a bicycle lock to tempt thieves with the challenge of stealing it. Soon Snake breaks the chain and takes it.

Although he agrees Marge was right about the trampoline, Homer argues that he is at least willing to go out and try new things while she is considered a bore who nags too much. When Bart and Lisa agree with Homer's assessment, Marge becomes angry and visits Patty and Selma. They show her an infomercial featuring self-help guru Brad Goodman to help conquer her chronic nagging. After Marge and Homer watch a Brad Goodman video, they learn to express their frustrations with each other using self-help language, and subsequently get along better.

The Simpsons attend a Brad Goodman lecture, hoping they will learn how to curb Bart's unruly behavior. When Bart interrupts the lecture, Goodman invites Bart on stage and interviews him. Bart mocks him and says that he "[does] what he feels like," which Goodman interprets as a representation of an "inner child." Goodman encourages the town to adopt Bart's irreverent and carefree attitude. However, Bart becomes downhearted when he feels as if his reputation as a troublemaker has been usurped as everyone begins copying his methods.

To celebrate their new-found attitude, the town holds a "Do What You Feel Festival", which features a performance by James Brown. It immediately goes awry because maintenance workers "didn't feel like" properly erecting the stage for Brown's band or installing amusement rides. A runaway Ferris wheel smashes the gates of a zoo, sending a stampede of wild animals through the streets. Soon a riot starts because everyone has learned to say whatever they are thinking, regardless of its effect on others. Blaming Bart for starting the whole "Do What You Feel" fiasco, a mob chases him. Using a parade float, Homer saves him. The Simpsons return home and conclude that everyone is fine the way they are.

== Production ==
"Bart's Inner Child" was written by George Meyer and directed by Bob Anderson. It was Anderson's directorial debut on The Simpsons. Meyer's inspiration for the episode came from the fact that he was going through therapy at the time and he thought it would be a good idea "to send up these self-help gurus".

Actor Albert Brooks guest starred in the episode as Brad Goodman. It was Brooks' third appearance on the show after playing Jacques in "Life on the Fast Lane" and Cowboy Bob in "The Call of the Simpsons". He would later guest star as Hank Scorpio in "You Only Move Twice", Tab Spangler in "The Heartbroke Kid", and Russ Cargill in The Simpsons Movie. Executive producer David Mirkin describes Brooks as "really weird to direct" because "almost every one of his takes is flawless, but each one has different material. He makes up the stuff as he goes." He uses a combination of the jokes in the script and his own material and because many of his takes are different, it is difficult for the producers to decide which lines to use. Goodman was based on the American self-help author John Bradshaw, who popularized such psychological ideas as the "wounded inner child" and the dysfunctional family.

James Brown guest stars as himself. Brown makes an appearance at the "Do What You Feel" festival, during which he sings his 1965 song "I Got You (I Feel Good)". After a bandstand collapses, he proclaims "Hey, wait a minute, hold on here! This bandstand wasn't double-bolted!" He described the experience as "good, clean, and humorous. And we need more of that around." According to Mirkin, the writers like to give guest stars awkward lines that then sound funny coming from them. They knew Brown would not be "the greatest actor in the world" but still "gave him these incredibly hilarious, stiff lines that killed." Mirkin described Brown's line as "horrible" but because of Brown's reading, "you have something that just sounds perfectly wrong and it makes it funny." In his book Planet Simpson, Chris Turner describes Brown's performance as "hilariously over-the-top" and uses it as an example of how the early seasons of the show would include celebrity cameos and not point out the "enormity of their fame".

== Cultural references ==
The scene with a field full of injured children from the trampoline is a reference to the field of injured soldiers shot in Gone with the Wind. The sequence of Homer trying to push the trampoline off of a cliff is a reference to the Chuck Jones-directed Wile E. Coyote and Road Runner Looney Tunes cartoons. The background imitates the desert landscape from the cartoons. At church, Reverend Lovejoy attempts to play the classic rag "The Entertainer" by Scott Joplin on the organ.

== Reception ==
=== Ratings ===
In its original broadcast, "Bart's Inner Child" finished 40th in the weekly ratings during the week of November 8–14, 1993 with a Nielsen rating of 11.8, and was viewed in 11.12 million households. It was the highest-rated show on Fox that week.

=== Critical reception ===
In 2006, Albert Brooks was named the best Simpsons guest star by IGN, who said he "captivate[s] the audience with his unique characters". In Planet Simpson, Chris Turner also praised Brooks' performance, writing that "Brooks went for a subtle, slow-burn lampoon rather than broad caricature: his Goodman doesn't ooze insincerity, he just lightly dribbles it. [...] Through a dozen little touches, Brooks created a timeless Simpsons character." Turner described the Wile E. Coyote and Road Runner homage as "one of the show's most overt and inspired tributes to the Warner cartoons."

Today's Patrick Enwright listed the episode as his ninth favorite in the show in 2007, saying it "brilliantly skewers new-agey self-help gurus" and adding that "it's also noteworthy for clever pop-cultural references."

The authors of I Can't Believe It's a Bigger and Better Updated Unofficial Simpsons Guide, Gary Russell and Gareth Roberts, described it as "A very bizarre episode in which everyone just has a good time." DVD Movie Guide's Colin Jacobson wrote: "A certified classic, 'Child' mocks the self-help field and makes a good point along the way. Of course, it does all this with scads of clever moments and becomes a great show. As one who works in psychology, it's hard to resist this program's spoofery." Patrick Bromley of DVD Verdict gave the episode a grade of B+ and described Homer's escapades with the trampoline as "the episode's brightest spot." Bill Gibron of DVD Talk gave the episode a score of 4.5 out of 5.

Nathan Rabin praises the episode's skewering of self-help cliches, noting that "Homer and Marge watch a Brad Goodman video and are soon communicating with one another in the touchy-feely vernacular of self-help. They're so open and honest with their feelings and emotions that their dialogue barely resembles actual speech." He adds that the episode "is also incredibly insightful about the ways rebellion gets co-opted by society, forcing the rebellious to question themselves and the essence of their identity." He writes that it "makes philosophy not just palatable and relatable but hilarious and unforgettable. And it's deep, too."
