= Sweet Seymour Skinner's Baadasssss Song =

- The Simpsons episode
- Bart and Skinner begin to form a bond after the latter is fired.
- Episode no.: Season 5 Episode 19
- Directed by: Bob Anderson
- Written by: Bill Oakley; Josh Weinstein
- Production code: 1F18
- Original air date: April 28, 1994

Guest appearance
- Frank Welker as various animals

Episode features
- Chalkboard gag: "I will not celebrate meaningless milestones"
- Couch gag: The Simpsons sit on the couch as a translucent Fox network watermark logo appears in the lower right-hand corner of the screen. Homer peels off the logo and everyone stomps on it.
- Commentary: Matt Groening; David Mirkin; Bill Oakley; Josh Weinstein; Bob Anderson; David Silverman

Episode chronology
| ← Previous "Burns' Heir" | Next → "The Boy Who Knew Too Much" |
- The Simpsons season 5

"Sweet Seymour Skinner's Baadasssss Song" is the nineteenth episode of the fifth season of the American animated television series The Simpsons, and the 100th episode overall. It originally aired on the Fox network in the United States on April 28, 1994. In the episode, Superintendent Chalmers fires Principal Skinner after a disaster at the school. Bart, feeling partially responsible for Skinner's firing, tries to help his old principal get his job back.

The episode was written by Bill Oakley and Josh Weinstein, and directed by Bob Anderson. It was selected for release in a 1999 video collection of selected episodes called The Simpsons: Greatest Hits. The episode features cultural references to films such as Alien, Jurassic Park, Crocodile Dundee and Full Metal Jacket and the television series The Wonder Years. The title is a reference to the film Sweet Sweetback's Baadasssss Song. Baby Gerald, Luigi Risotto, Assistant Superintendent Leopold, and Flanders' parents make their debuts in this episode.

Since airing, the episode has received a positive critical reception from television critics. It acquired a Nielsen rating of 12.7, and was the highest-rated show on the Fox network the week it aired.

== Plot ==
After failing to find an adequate object to bring for show and tell at Springfield Elementary School, Bart decides to bring Santa's Little Helper to school. Bart's show and tell presentation is well received by the class, but the dog escapes into the air ducts. Principal Skinner sends Groundskeeper Willie through a vent to retrieve Santa's Little Helper. Willie catches Santa's Little Helper but becomes trapped in the ducts. As firemen attempt to rescue him, Superintendent Chalmers arrives for a surprise inspection. Willie falls from the vent and lands on Chalmers. Chalmers reveals he has reached a breaking point with Skinner's administration of the school, and fires Skinner.

Chalmers hires Ned Flanders as the new principal of Springfield Elementary School. Because of Ned's reluctance to use discipline, the children run amok and their academic ability falls further. Instead of rejoicing at the lack of discipline, Bart feels guilty for getting Skinner fired. Skinner and Bart become friends, and Bart informs Skinner of Ned's failure to run the school effectively. Feeling lonely, Skinner decides to re-enlist in the United States Army. However, Skinner is unable to effectively train the Army's new recruits, who do not respect him.

To get Skinner his job back, Bart helps Skinner get out of the Army by violating Don't Ask, Don't Tell and tries to expose Ned's poor leadership to Chalmers. Skinner and Bart sadly note that once Skinner becomes principal again, their friendship cannot continue unless Bart becomes a good student, which Bart bluntly says is unlikely to happen. Despite the chaos at the school, Chalmers is unconcerned because he always disliked Skinner and because he believes all American public schools will soon be in a similar state of chaos. However, after hearing Ned utter a brief mention of God during school announcements, Chalmers becomes outraged by Ned's mention of religion in a public school. Chalmers fires Ned and re-hires Skinner. Bart and Skinner lament the end of their friendship. They embrace, and both walk away chuckling, revealing that Bart put a "Kick me" sign on Skinner's back, and Skinner put a "Teach me" sign on Bart's back.

== Production ==
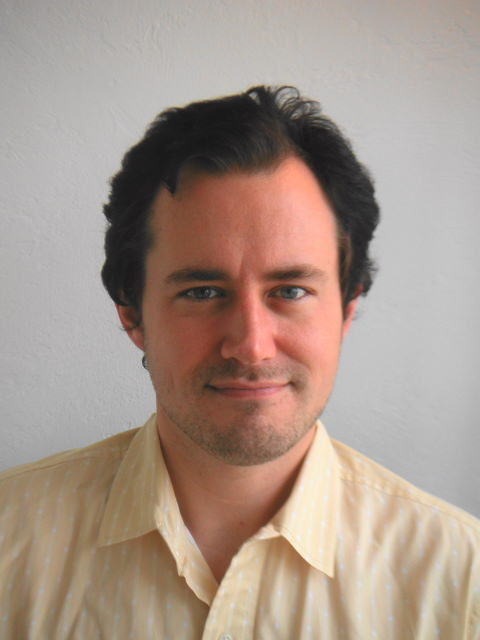
Bill Oakley wrote the episode along with Josh Weinstein.

"Sweet Seymour Skinner's Baadasssss Song" was written by Bill Oakley and Josh Weinstein, and directed by Bob Anderson. Oakley and Weinstein decided to do a Skinner and Bart episode because the staff wanted to take a diversion from the relatively wacky, fast-paced episodes that had comprised Season 5 so far and, according to show runner David Mirkin, "slow down parts of the show to take time for more emotional episodes like this one". Much of Principal Skinner's behavior in the episode is based on teachers Oakley and Weinstein had in high school who, according to Oakley, were "sad, lonely guys who lived with their mothers". It was selected to air as the 100th episode of the show because the staff wanted that particular episode to focus on Bart.

Leopold and Luigi were designed by David Silverman. Anderson thought Luigi was one of the funniest characters on the show when he first read Luigi's lines during a table read. When Anderson skimmed through the script and saw Luigi's lines, he said he "frightened Julie Kavner because I was laughing to myself, but trying to keep the laughter in because it was so damn funny."

== Cultural references ==
The title is a reference to Melvin Van Peebles's film Sweet Sweetback's Baadasssss Song (1971). The opening scene, in which Marge, Lisa, and Bart watch a home video, is a parody of The Wonder Years; the theme from that series, the Joe Cocker version of "With a Little Help from My Friends", plays. The scene in which Santa's Little Helper runs through the school vent is a reference to a scene in Alien (1979), as is Skinner's use of a heat-seeking tracer to pin down the positions of Groundskeeper Willie and Santa's Little Helper. Skinner says he was shot in the back at a United Service Organizations (USO) show while trying to get "Joey Heatherton to put some pants on". Skinner's attire and shots of him running with his troops are references to the 1987 film Full Metal Jacket. Skinner tells Bart of his plan to write a novel about an amusement park with cloned dinosaurs, Billy and the Cloneasaurus, which Apu, overhearing, condemns as plagiarism of Michael Crichton's Jurassic Park and its 1993 film adaptation. When Martin is in a cage, he is singing the Toreador Song from Bizet's opera Carmen.

In describing the dynamic between Bart and Skinner, Lisa compares them to Sherlock Holmes and Professor Moriarty and to Mountain Dew and Mello Yello, concluding that Bart needs Skinner as an adversary in order to be truly happy. Skinner's line "We'll always have the laundromat" is a reference to a famous quote from Rick Blaine (Humphrey Bogart) in Casablanca: "We'll always have Paris."

== Reception ==
In its original American broadcast, "Sweet Seymour Skinner's Baadasssss Song" finished 16th in the ratings for the week of April 25–May 1, 1994, with a Nielsen Rating of 12.7, translating to 12 million households. The episode was the highest-rated show on the Fox network that week.

Since airing, the episode has received a positive critical reception. The authors of the book I Can't Believe It's a Bigger and Better Updated Unofficial Simpsons Guide, Gary Russell and Gareth Roberts, wrote, "The 100th episode [...] is a fine one, with Principal Skinner's idea for a novel and the conduct of the staff at the Italian restaurant as highpoints."

DVD Movie Guide's Colin Jacobson said the opening scene of episode reminded him of when he was in second grade and got a puppy for Christmas. Jacobson said, "I still recall the excitement when my mom brought [the dog] into school for the others to see, and the first segment of [the episode] reflects the atmosphere caused by a doggie visit. The rest of the episode gets into Skinner's life nicely. Toss in a great Alien reference and the episode offers yet another solid show." Jacobson also said he liked the appearance of Flanders's "beatnik father".

Gary Mullinax of The News Journal called the episode "very funny" and named it one of his top-ten favorite episodes. Patrick Bromley of DVD Verdict gave the episode a B+ grade, and Bill Gibron of DVD Talk gave the episode a 4 out of 5 score. Dave Manley of DVDActive said in a review of The Simpsons: Greatest Hits that it was "certainly one of the weaker [episodes on the DVD] – I can only assume the fact that it was episode 100 is what gets it onto this disc."

Nathan Rabin writes that "Rather than going big and star-studded with its 100th episode, it got intimate and small with one of the subtlest episodes of the show's 1990s golden years. 'Sweet Seymour Skinner's Baadasssss Song' is full of wonderfully realized little moments that convey volumes about characters, like the newly unemployed and rudderless Principal Skinner reciting the invariably hyperbolic names of laundry detergents. Nobody is going to buy a detergent called 'Adequate' with so many superlatively-named competitors on the shelves, and Harry Shearer's deadpan inflection clashes amusingly with the chipper words coming out of his mouth. The episode plunges deep inside the buttoned-down mind of Principal Skinner, exploring the sour sadness of his life with clear-eyed compassion and pity...'Sweet Seymour Skinner's Baadassss Song' ends as it must: With Skinner back as principal. He and Bart are comfortably enemies once more but a little of their short-lived friendship remains when Bart impishly puts a sign on Skinner's back and Skinner in turn puts a sign reading, 'Teach Me' on Bart's back. Instead of proving to the world how big and crazy and outrageous it could be, The Simpsons instead proved just how powerful and funny it could be at its quietest."
