= Secrets of a Successful Marriage =

- The Simpsons episode
- Episode no.: Season 5 Episode 22
- Directed by: Carlos Baeza
- Written by: Greg Daniels
- Production code: 1F20
- Original air date: May 19, 1994

Guest appearance
- Phil Hartman as Lionel Hutz

Episode features
- Chalkboard gag: "Five days is not too long to wait for a gun"
- Couch gag: The members of the family run in, collide, and explode. Maggie's pacifier falls to the floor of the blackened living room.
- Commentary: David Mirkin; Greg Daniels; David Silverman

Episode chronology
← Previous "Lady Bouvier's Lover"	Next → "Bart of Darkness"
- The Simpsons season 5

"Secrets of a Successful Marriage" is the twenty-second and final episode of the fifth season of the American animated television series The Simpsons. It originally aired on the Fox network in the United States on May 19, 1994. In the episode, Homer fears he may be a little slow, so he goes to the adult education center. While there, he decides to teach a class of his own on the secrets of a successful marriage, since that is the only class he is qualified to teach. However, to keep his students interested, he is forced to tell personal secrets about his wife Marge, which she dislikes on learning of, leading up to Homer getting kicked out of the house.

The episode was written by Greg Daniels and directed by Carlos Baeza. It features cultural references to the plays Cat on a Hot Tin Roof and A Streetcar Named Desire, and the films ...And Justice for All, A Few Good Men, Patton, and Chinatown.

The episode has been analyzed in books such as Leaving Springfield and Education in Popular Culture. Since airing, the episode has received mostly positive reviews from television critics.

It acquired a Nielsen rating of 9.8, and was the second highest-rated show on the Fox network the week it aired.

== Plot ==
Homer is disheartened to learn that all of his peers, including his family, believe he is "slow". Marge advises Homer to take an adult education course. While looking at available courses, Homer decides to teach a class himself, and is soon hired to teach a class about how to build a successful marriage. On the first day of class, Homer is unable to help his students with their relationship problems. As the students begin leaving, Homer mentions his conversation with Marge in bed and the students, eager to hear gossip, decide to stay. To the students' delight, Homer begins telling them personal secrets about Marge.

After hearing Homer's students mention her personal secrets, Marge confronts Homer. He promises to stop revealing personal secrets in class, but relents after realizing his students are not interested in his other teaching material. To impress his pupils, Homer invites them to his house to observe the family having dinner, but when Moe mentions another personal secret, a furious Marge chases the students away and evicts Homer from the house, as she is no longer able to trust him in any matter.

With nowhere to go, Homer sleeps in Bart's treehouse. Bart and Lisa worry their parents will get divorced. Attempting to make amends, Homer returns to the house with flowers for Marge, but is disheartened to learn Moe has already given Marge flowers. As he turns to leave, Homer realizes he can only offer Marge one thing: complete and utter dependency. Marge is hesitant at first, but she and Homer reconcile when she realizes he makes her feel needed.

== Production ==
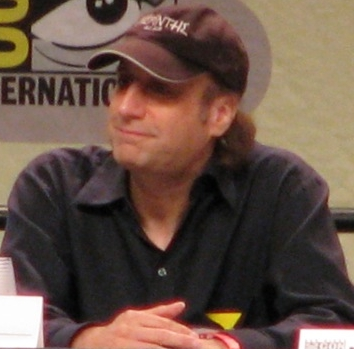
David Mirkin was the episode's executive producer.

The episode was written by Greg Daniels and directed by Carlos Baeza. It was the second script Daniels wrote for the show. He thought the staff had previously done many episodes where Homer "wasn't good at anything", so he tried to figure out something Homer was really good at, and he came up with the idea of Homer being a good husband. While Bart had been the star of the show during the early years, by Season 5, the focus had shifted to Homer. Writer/showrunner Al Jean stated that because Homer is an adult character, he has more depth to him and thus storyline possibilities. Showrunner David Mirkin commented: "Bart, to write him accurately as a child, he can only have so much depth at a certain age. With Homer, we try to explore all levels of adulthood. There are just more places to go. Writing Homer properly is the trick, he's our main rock of the whole series. Homer's IQ is fairly flexible, he won't necessarily understand how to open a door at some point, but he can name the Supreme Court justices. Finding that balance is key to making the show work and making it surprising and making it believable and emotionally grounded." Mirkin was very fond of the fact that Homer and Marge have the biggest fight they have ever had on the show in the episode, and he thought it was a "really great" exploration of their marriage. He noticed that because Homer is thrown out of the house, the audience really worry about their relationship. Mirkin had been asked many times why Marge and Homer are still together, to which he replied that all people stay together even if they argue, "there's some sort of connection".

== Cultural references ==
Homer sings the end of the theme song to Family Ties while talking to an administrator at the annex center. Smithers's recollection of his marriage parodies the two plays Cat on a Hot Tin Roof and A Streetcar Named Desire, both written by American playwright Tennessee Williams. Homer's bedroom rant to Marge is a parody mishmash of four popular films: ...And Justice for All (1979), A Few Good Men (1992), Patton (1970), and Chinatown (1974). He says: "Look Marge, you don't know what it's like. I'm the one out there every day putting his ass on the line. And I'm not out of order! You're out of order. The whole freaking system is out of order. You want the truth? You want the truth?! You can't handle the truth! 'Cause when you reach over and put your hand into a pile of goo that was your best friend's face, you'll know what to do! Forget it, Marge, it's Chinatown," all of which are lines from those films.

== Analysis ==
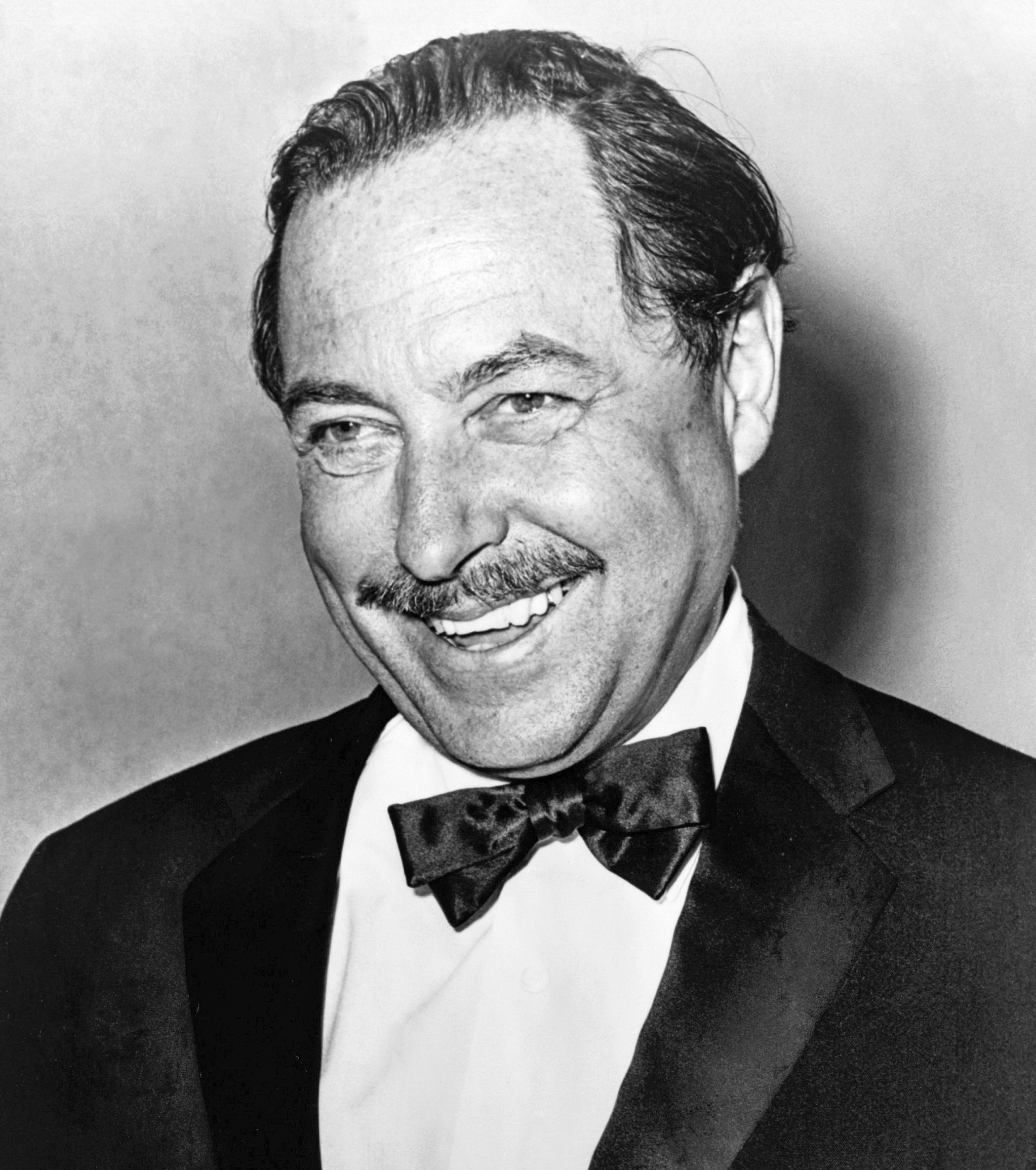
In a reference to Tennessee Williams's most famous plays, Smithers is shown in a flashback to have split up with his wife because he devoted too much time to his boss Mr. Burns, causing his sexual orientation to come into question.

It was revealed in a flashback in the episode that Smithers was briefly married to a woman, but the two split up when he devoted too much time to his boss Mr. Burns. Smithers's relationship with Mr. Burns has long been a running joke on The Simpsons. His sexual orientation has often come into question, with some fans claiming he is a "Burns-sexual" and only attracted to his boss, while others maintain that he is, without a doubt, gay. Matthew Henry wrote in the book Leaving Springfield that this episode is "perhaps the best" example of an attempt to portray an actual gay lifestyle on the show. Henry added that the flashback is a "wonderfully rendered parody of scenes from two of Tennessee Williams's most famous plays, Cat on a Hot Tin Roof and A Streetcar Named Desire. To fully appreciate it, one must know something of not only the two plays cited but also of Williams himself, of his own struggles with both heterosexual and homosexual desires and the way in which these struggles were incorporated into his art. The creators of The Simpsons offer what I think is a perfect parallel for the relationship between Smithers and Mr. Burns by combining Williams's two most notable male characters and their defining characteristics: the suppressed homosexual desire of Brick and desperate dependence of Stanley."

In their book Education in Popular Culture, Alma Harris, Roy Fisher, Ann Harris, and Christine Jarvis analyzes the adult education aspects of this episode that portrays adult learners as "stupid and lazy". The show initially makes it seem like adult education tutors have a relatively high status in society. "However," the authors added, "Homer's pride is undercut for the audience by the awareness of how he came to be appointed and by the subsequent representation of the adult education center".

== Reception ==
In its original American broadcast, "Secrets of a Successful Marriage" finished forty-third in the ratings for the week of May 16 to May 22, 1994, with a Nielsen rating of 9.8. The episode was the second highest-rated show on the Fox network that week, following Melrose Place.

Since airing, the episode has received positive reviews from television critics. The authors of the book I Can't Believe It's a Bigger and Better Updated Unofficial Simpsons Guide, Gary Russell and Gareth Roberts, thought it was a "confident finale" to the fifth season, which "had seen the series become progressively more surreal and self-aware."

DVD Movie Guide's Colin Jacobson wrote in December, 2004, that he thought the episode ended the season with a "high note", and that Homer’s insensitive gossiping about his relationship "presents lots of good bits. It completes this excellent year well." Jacobson's favorite line of the episode was "This is a place of learning, not a house of hearing about things!", which Homer tells his class after they demand him to reveal more secrets about him and Marge. Also reviewing the season in December 2004, Bill Gibron of DVD Talk gave the episode a score of 4 out of 5.

In his review of the Season 5 box set in early 2005, Patrick Bromley of DVD Verdict gave the episode a grade of A−, and commented that episodes focusing on the relationship between Homer and Marge can "never fail", and there are "numerous opportunities for some classic Homer-isms" in the episode.

In an interview with Entertainment Weekly in March 2006, one-time Simpsons writer and comedian Ricky Gervais named "Secrets of a Successful Marriage" his fifth favorite episode of the show, and commented that Homer's line to Marge, "I know now what I can offer you that no one else can. Complete and utter dependence," is "so sweet, because he's right!"

It ranked seventh on Today's top ten The Simpsons episodes list in July, 2007. They felt the episode embodied Homer's qualities of being "stupid, good-natured and mildly pathetic, [...] from his conversations with his brain [...] to his final proclamation that the one thing he can give Marge that no one else can is 'complete and utter dependence'."
