= Marge on the Lam =

- The Simpsons episode
- Episode no.: Season 5 Episode 6
- Directed by: Mark Kirkland
- Written by: Bill Canterbury
- Production code: 1F03
- Original air date: November 4, 1993

Guest appearances
- George Fenneman as the narrator; Phil Hartman as Lionel Hutz and Troy McClure; Pamela Reed as Ruth Powers

Episode features
- Couch gag: The family run towards the couch and crash through the wall.
- Commentary: Matt Groening; David Mirkin; Mark Kirkland; David Silverman

Episode chronology
← Previous "Treehouse of Horror IV"	Next → "Bart's Inner Child"
- The Simpsons season 5

"Marge on the Lam" is the sixth episode of the fifth season of the American animated television series The Simpsons. It originally aired on the Fox network in the United States on November 4, 1993. After Marge invites her neighbor Ruth Powers to attend a ballet recital, they become friends. Homer grows jealous of their friendship and pursues them, resulting in a police chase led by Chief Wiggum that ends in near-disaster.

The episode, which serves largely as a parody of Thelma & Louise and the Dragnet franchise, was written by Bill Canterbury and directed by Mark Kirkland, while Phil Hartman, Pamela Reed and George Fenneman serve as guest stars.

== Plot ==
After donating money to a telethon, Marge receives complimentary ballet tickets. Marge guilts Homer into accompanying her by reminding him of how he once volunteered as a test subject in a United States Army experiment to avoid visiting Patty and Selma with her. However, Homer gets both of his arms stuck in a pair of vending machines at work. Disappointed and doubting Homer's story, Marge invites her neighbor, Ruth Powers, to go with her instead. Ruth and Marge enjoy themselves and agree to spend time with each other again. The next night, Ruth and Marge visit several bars and clubs in Springfield and Ruth teaches Marge how to use a pistol, using a forlorn farmer's "precious antique cans" for target practice.

To show he can have a good time without Marge, Homer visits the hilltop where he and Marge used to spend time before they got married, but finds it is no fun without her. While tending his moonshine still on the hill, Chief Wiggum spots Homer and offers him a ride home. At one point, Wiggum decides to perform a routine traffic stop on the car Ruth and Marge are in. Ruth speeds up and reveals to Marge that she is driving her ex-husband's stolen car in retaliation for his failure to pay child support. Still in Wiggum's backseat, Homer realizes Marge is in Ruth's car and believes she has turned to a life of crime because of his neglect. Ruth then successfully evades Wiggum by turning off her headlights, however both Homer and Chief Wiggum react nervously, as Chief Wiggum thinks it is a ghost car.

After seeing Marge and Ruth again the next morning, Homer and Wiggum continue their pursuit as they are joined by all of the latter's fellow officers. The duo then start to unknowingly drive towards a cliffside leading into the Grand Chasm and Homer mistakes this for a suicide attempt. Using a megaphone, Homer apologizes to Marge for all of his shortcomings and urges them not to drive into the chasm. Now aware of the danger she and Marge are in, Ruth stops the car near the cliff's edge, while Homer and Wiggum fail to stop in time, fly off it and land in a mountain of landfill debris. They emerge slightly soiled from its waste but otherwise unscathed.

A narrator then describes the fates of the characters in the style of Dragnet:

- Ruth Powers was tried in Springfield Superior Court. The judge dismissed her ex-husband's auto theft charges and forced him to pay all back child support. Mr. Powers blamed the outcome on his lawyer, one Lionel Hutz.
- Lionel Hutz, a.k.a. Miguel Sanchez, a.k.a. Doctor Nguyen Van Thoc, was paid eight dollars for his thirty-two hours of babysitting. He was glad to get it.
- Marge Simpson was charged with a violation of penal code section 618A: "wanton destruction of precious antique cans". She was ordered to pay fifty cents to replace the cans and two thousand dollars in punitive damages and mental anguish.
- Homer Simpson was remanded to the custody of the United States Army Neurochemical Research Center at Fort Meade, Maryland for extensive testing.

== Production ==
Dan Castellaneta utilized an actual bullhorn for the part of Homer using one to apologize to Marge in the episode's climax. The sunset shown when Marge and Ruth are at the café was airbrushed in, although the episode was done before computer animation was put into practice.

== Cultural references ==
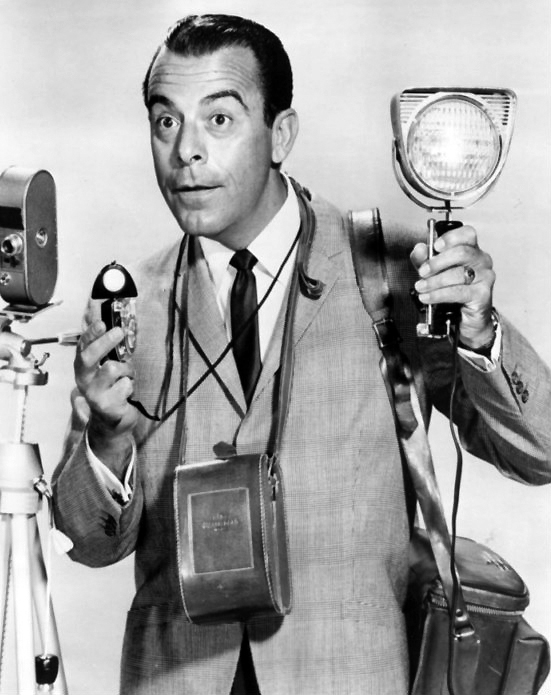
George Fenneman narrates the end of the episode, which parodies the Dragnet franchise

Much of the plot, including the scene when Homer is in Moe's Tavern and the climax where the stolen car and Homer and Wiggum's fall over the chasm, is a parody of Ridley Scott's Thelma & Louise. The music played during Homer's visualisation of the term ballet is Entrance of the Gladiators by Julius Fučík. Crystal Buzz Cola is a reference to the fad drink Crystal Pepsi, and when Homer reaches into the vending machine, a can of Fresca is seen in the grasp of a skeletal hand stuck in there. The comedian who performs at the telethon that the Simpsons family watches at the beginning of the episode and does not find funny is a parody of Garrison Keillor and his "News from Lake Wobegon" monologues. Ruth mistakenly inserts Lesley Gore's "Sunshine, Lollipops and Rainbows" into her car stereo before beginning her and Marge's wild night out; after extracting it, Ruth pops in Guns N' Roses' "Welcome to the Jungle". Later, Wiggum plays the former on his police cruiser's stereo as car chase music. Quimby dancing in a night club is in reference to the Kennedys. When Marge gets hit on in the bar, the guy who does not talk is a caricature of show runner David Mirkin. The farmer that comes out when Marge is shooting his cans is a caricature of Walter Brennan. The episode's closing sequence is a reference to the Dragnet franchise. George Fenneman recorded the ending in the same style he did on that series.

== Reception ==
In its original broadcast, "Marge on the Lam" finished 32nd in ratings for the week of November 1–7, 1993, with a Nielsen rating of 13.1, equivalent to approximately 12.2 million viewing households. It was the highest-rated show on the Fox network that week, beating Beverly Hills, 90210.

The authors of the book I Can't Believe It's a Bigger and Better Updated Unofficial Simpsons Guide, Gary Russell and Gareth Roberts, said "Marge getting to let her hair down is always a treat, and in Ruth Powers she seems to have a real friend. A pity we don't see more of her".

The A.V. Club named Homer's line "Stupid TV! Be more funny!" as one of the quotes from The Simpsons that can be used in everyday situations.

=== Legacy ===
On their album And Then Nothing Turned Itself Inside Out (2000), Yo La Tengo has a song entitled "Let's Save Tony Orlando's House"; the song is named after a telethon in Troy McClure's fictional CV in this episode.
