= Bart of Darkness =

- The Simpsons episode
- Episode no.: Season 6 Episode 1
- Directed by: Jim Reardon
- Written by: Dan McGrath
- Production code: 1F22
- Original air date: September 4, 1994

Episode features
- Chalkboard gag: "Beans are neither fruit nor musical"
- Couch gag: The Simpsons sit down in midair; the couch builds itself on top of the family and makes them fall.
- Commentary: Matt Groening; David Mirkin; Jim Reardon; David S. Cohen; Greg Daniels; David Silverman

Episode chronology
← Previous "Secrets of a Successful Marriage"	Next → "Lisa's Rival"
- The Simpsons season 6

"Bart of Darkness" is the premiere of the sixth season of the American animated television series The Simpsons. It originally aired on Fox in the United States on September 4, 1994. In the episode, Bart breaks his leg and becomes increasingly isolated. Spying on Ned Flanders from his room, Bart suspects that Ned has murdered his wife. The episode was produced during the 1994 Northridge earthquake, which delayed production by a month, and it was originally going to be the season five finale and is largely a parody of Alfred Hitchcock's Rear Window (1954).

The episode was written by Dan McGrath and directed by Jim Reardon.

== Plot ==
During a heatwave, Bart and Lisa persuade Homer to buy a swimming pool for their backyard after a day of swimming in a mobile pool truck. Once the backyard pool is up and running, the family holds a town-wide pool party that ends with Bart breaking his leg in an attempt to dive into the pool from the tree house; after a hospital visit, Bart is ordered to spend the rest of the summer wearing a full cast over his broken leg, leaving him unable to swim in the pool or socialize with any of the other children. To cheer him up, Lisa gets Bart a telescope, which he uses to spy on other town residents. Bart becomes gradually more concerned about his next door neighbor Ned Flanders after he first hears a womanly scream from his house, and later witnesses Ned digging a grave in the backyard and remorsefully calling himself a "murderer". The next day, Bart overhears Ned telling his sons Rod and Todd that their mother is "with God" and they will soon join her. All of this leads Bart to believe that Ned has killed his wife Maude and is now planning to do the same to their children.

Lisa revels in her newfound popularity with the schoolkids as a direct result of the swimming pool, until the other children abandon her in favor of Martin Prince, whose family now has an even bigger backyard pool than the Simpsons. Without the attention from the other kids, Lisa soon notices Bart's fears of what Ned might be up to, and she reluctantly agrees to help him investigate by sneaking into the Flanders house while Ned is away. However, Ned unexpectedly comes home early and Lisa hides upstairs, causing Bart to chase after Ned. The three of them soon meet in the attic where Bart accuses Ned, who faints from the shock.

After the police arrive to question Ned, they discover that Maude is alive and well, having just returned from her time "with God" at a Bible camp in the countryside. Bart presses Ned about the grave in his backyard, forcing Ned to tearfully confess that he dug the grave for one of Maude's houseplants after realizing it was overwatered. When Ned sees the police have unearthed the dead plant from his backyard, he lets out a high-pitched scream which Bart recognizes as the womanly scream he originally heard. Martin's turn as the new popular kid goes well until he overestimates the capacity of the new pool, which quickly collapses from the physical stress. While the schoolkids all walk away in anger, Nelson rips off Martin's swim trunks. Martin, naked and alone amid the wreckage, solemnly sings "Summer Wind" as he watches the sunset.

== Production ==
For season six, 20th Century Fox moved The Simpsons back to its original Sunday night time of 8 pm, having aired on Thursdays for the previous four seasons. It has remained in this slot ever since.

Dan McGrath was chosen to write the episode, while Jim Reardon directed. The episode was originally produced as the season finale of the fifth season, but was held over and aired as the premiere of the sixth. This was because the episode, along with "Lisa's Rival", was in production at the time of the 1994 Northridge earthquake. The earthquake damaged much of the Film Roman building in which The Simpsons writing and animation staff worked, forcing them to move out for three months and continue production in a temporary building. The only staff members that came in expecting to work were future show runners Bill Oakley and Josh Weinstein. As a result, the staff was given a month more than they would usually have had to work on the episode, which Reardon described as "greatly benefiting" it. Having been a director on the series for five years, he believed that this episode "was closer to what [he] was trying to achieve as a director than [he] had done before". He credited this to the extra time, and used it to insert little details, such as having Bart get stuck on the fabric of the chair he was in, and wearing his underwear instead of a swimsuit.

Many of the heatwave jokes at the start of the episode were based on events from the crew's lives. The sitting in front of the fridge-freezer joke came from McGrath, who had done something similar as a child. The Springfield Pool-Mobile was based on a similar vehicle from David Mirkin's childhood, where a truck with a "spinning cars" fairground ride on the back would often come around his neighborhood. Flanders' feminine scream was performed by Tress MacNeille and not his regular voice actor Harry Shearer. Krusty's mispronunciation of Ravi Shankar's name was an ad-lib that Mirkin kept in after the editing process because he liked it so much.

== Cultural references ==
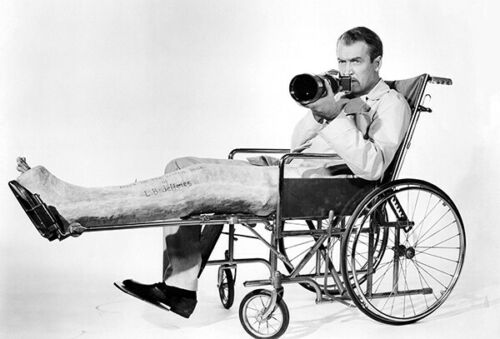
The third act of the episode parodies the film Rear Window, twice showing the character L. B. "Jeff" Jefferies.

The title is a reference to Joseph Conrad's 1899 novella Heart of Darkness. Springfield's wax museum features models of The Beatles and the original cast of M*A*S*H. The barn building scene with the onlooking Amish man is a reference to Peter Weir's film Witness. The pool dance scene sees Lisa in a role reminiscent of Esther Williams. The Itchy & Scratchy episode title references Planet of the Apes, with the mutants being a reference to the Star Trek episode "The Menagerie". The first Klassic Krusty episode is dated February 6, 1961. Krusty's guest was AFL–CIO chairman George Meany.

The third act is largely a parody of Alfred Hitchcock's Rear Window. As in the film, a crippled Bart witnesses an apparent murder through his telescope, with the original musical cues also being used. James Stewart's character, L. B. "Jeff" Jefferies, appears twice, caricatured as his initial film appearance. The pictures on the wall of Jeff's room are the same as in Rear Window. At the end of the episode, Martin begins to sing Frank Sinatra's "Summer Wind"; the song then continues instrumentally over the closing credits, instead of the show's usual theme music.

== Reception ==
=== Ratings ===
In this original American broadcast, "Bart of Darkness" finished 44th in the ratings for the week of August 29 to September 4, 1994, with a Nielsen rating of 8.9 and an audience share of 17. The episode was the third highest rated show on the Fox network that week.

=== Critical reception ===
Mike Duffy praised the episode, stating it showed that The Simpsons was "just as strong and funny as it ever was".

Elaine Liner of the Corpus Christi Caller-Times praised the writing as "crisp, hilarious and multi-layered", praising its many cultural references and noting the "biting commentary" of Maude Flanders' line, "I was at Bible camp learning to be more judgmental". Later reviews shared these sentiments.

Gary Russell and Gareth Roberts, authors of the book I Can't Believe It's a Bigger and Better Updated Unofficial Simpsons Guide, found that the "eventual explanation for [Flanders'] murderous behavior is hilarious". Tim Knight called it "a terrific opener to the season".

Erik Adams, in The A.V. Club, writes that "'Bart Of Darkness' starts The Simpsons' sixth season off on the right foot with a full-bodied embrace of its source material and a comedic core that challenges traditional TV logic. The episode may have marked the show's induction into the television establishment, but it would be many more years before any of its well-honed edges would be blunted by complacency."
