= Homer Loves Flanders =

- The Simpsons episode
- Episode no.: Season 5 Episode 16
- Directed by: Wes M. "Bud" Archer
- Written by: David Richardson
- Production code: 1F14
- Original air date: March 17, 1994

Episode features
- Chalkboard gag: "I am not delightfully saucy"
- Couch gag: The family walks in, seeing two couches, and the family split in half, with half of each member choosing a couch.
- Commentary: Matt Groening; David Mirkin; David Richardson; Wes Archer; David Silverman

Episode chronology
← Previous "Deep Space Homer"	Next → "Bart Gets an Elephant"
- The Simpsons season 5

"Homer Loves Flanders" is the sixteenth episode of the fifth season of The Simpsons. It originally aired on the Fox network in the United States on March 17, 1994. In the episode, Ned Flanders invites Homer to a football game and the two become good friends. However, in a reversal of their usual roles, Ned soon grows weary of Homer's overbearing friendship and stupid antics, and actually begins to hate him.

The episode was written by David Richardson and directed by Wes Archer. It was the last episode to be pitched by writer Conan O'Brien before he left The Simpsons. It is the only episode of The Simpsons that Richardson wrote. It references films such as Terminator 2: Judgment Day, The Deadly Tower, Vertigo and The Ten Commandments, and songs such as "Two Tickets to Paradise", "Macho Man", and "Helter Skelter".

Since airing, the episode has received positive reviews from television critics. It acquired a Nielsen rating of 10.9, and was the third highest-rated show on the Fox network the week it aired.

== Plot ==
Homer unsuccessfully tries to get tickets for a football game, the "Pigskin Classic" between the Springfield Atoms and the Shelbyville Sharks. He misses eight days of work to camp outside the Shelbyville Stadium but the entire allocation of tickets is bought by a scalper, from whom, ironically, Homer can now not afford the tickets due to the eight days of work which he missed. He then misses out on winning a pair of tickets in a radio contest. Ned Flanders wins the tickets and invites Homer as his guest. Although he dislikes Ned, Homer grudgingly accepts, after Marge catches him attempting to steal the tickets by hitting Ned on the head with a water pipe. The Atoms win the game with a last play touchdown and Ned persuades the winning quarterback to give the game ball to Homer. Overwhelmed by Ned's generosity, Homer befriends Ned and his family.

Homer begins acting overly grateful and annoys Ned and his family to no end by interrupting their family time together. After Ned invites Homer to join him in volunteering at a local homeless shelter, Homer's impatient distribution of food is mistaken for enthusiasm by a Springfield Shopper reporter, leading him to being falsely celebrated as a local hero. The Flanders family and the Simpson family go on a camping trip together but do not get along, with Homer wrecking the Flanders' car and boat in the process. Ned awakens from a nightmare and tells Maude that he has grown to hate Homer.

Homer remains oblivious to Ned's animosity. He arrives at the Flanders' house expecting to play golf, but Ned and his family get in their car and race off. Pulled over by Chief Wiggum for speeding, Ned takes a sobriety test as disapproving townspeople watch and conclude that he is on "goofballs". At church, people whisper about Ned's imagined indiscretions. As the entire congregation bow their heads in prayer (before a sermon calling out Ned specifically), Homer inhales very loudly through his nose, causing Ned to yell at him. This alarms the congregants, who become even more upset with Ned, but Homer sticks up for Ned, telling the parishioners "If everyone here were more like Ned Flanders, there'd be no need for Heaven, we would already be there."

The next week, everything returns to normal as Homer is again annoyed by Ned. Homer announces he recently inherited his great Uncle Boris's house, allegedly haunted. The Simpsons spend the night there. After turning out the lights, they see something that causes them to scream.

== Production ==
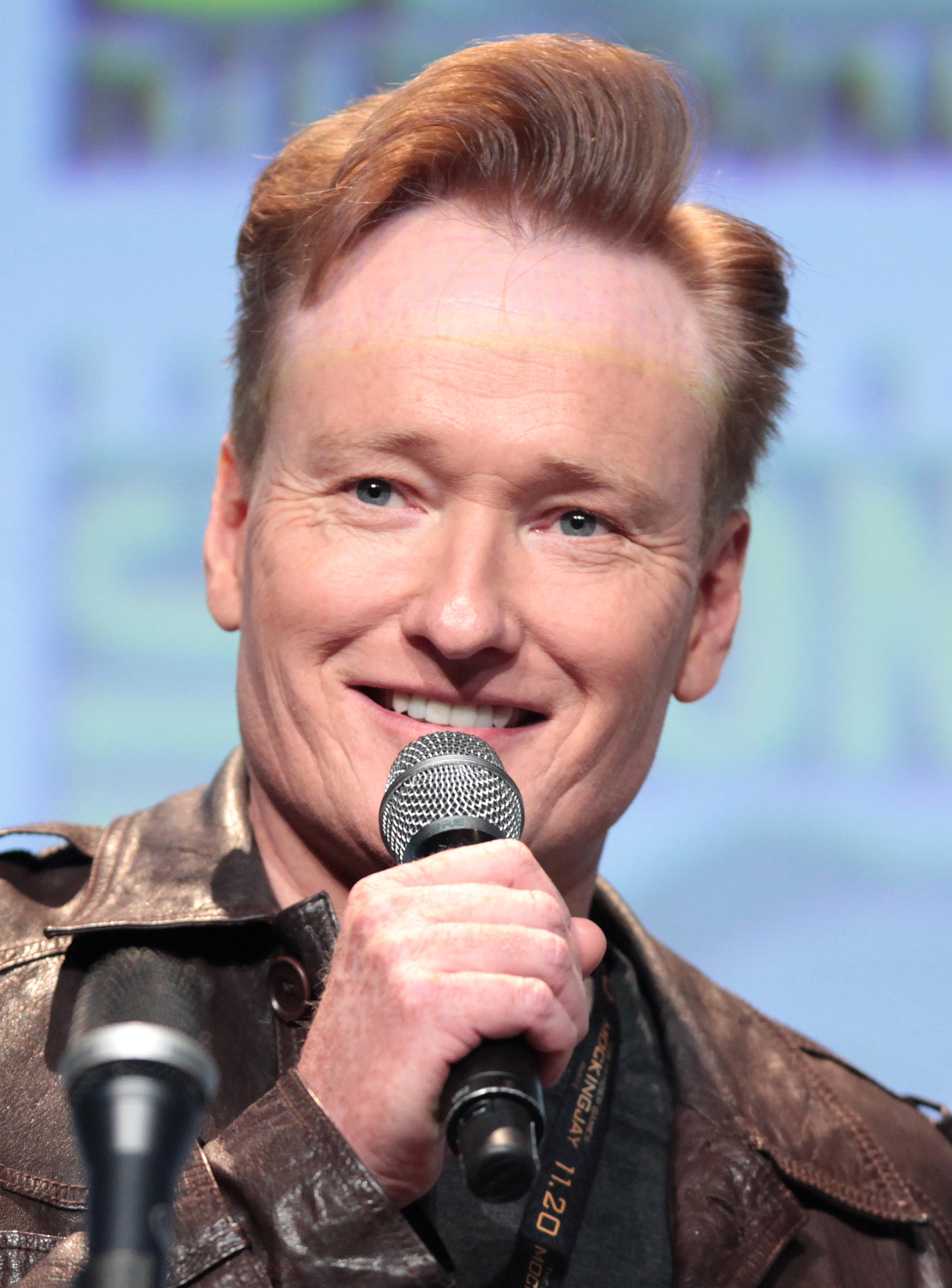
"Homer Loves Flanders" was the last episode to be pitched by Conan O'Brien before he left the show.

"Homer Loves Flanders" was the last episode to be pitched by Conan O'Brien before he left The Simpsons. David Richardson was assigned to write it, and Wes Archer to direct it. Richardson wrote the episode at a Motel 6 in Hemet, California while he was dating an actress who was shooting a film there. In this season, the staff wanted to take a deeper look at the relationships of the characters. One thing in particular they wanted to explore was what Homer and Flanders have in common and how they could become friends. Former showrunner David Mirkin enjoyed making Homer and Flanders get along because they normally do not. This was the only episode of the series that Richardson wrote.

The episode begins with the Simpson family watching a news broadcast in which the news anchor Kent Brockman calls the United States Army a "kill-bot factory". Mirkin said this was a joke the staff "particularly loved to do" because it pointed out how negative and mean-spirited news broadcasts can be, and how they are seemingly "always trying to scare everybody" by creating panic and depression. In one scene in the episode, Marge begins hallucinating after drinking from Springfield's water supply, which has been spiked with LSD by Springfield's rival town, Shelbyville. The Fox network's censors wanted the scene to be cut from the episode because they did not like the idea of Marge "getting high" on LSD. Mirkin defended the scene, and argued Marge was not "doing it on purpose", so the censors ultimately allowed the scene to remain in the episode. The censors also hated Ned's response to his wife telling him to drive his car faster ("I can't! It's a Geo!") fearing they could lose the car company's sponsorship, but Mirkin kept the line in. In another scene, Homer becomes frustrated at God for not getting the tickets to the game, and yells at a waffle stuck to the ceiling that he believes is God. Marge points out that it is just a waffle that Bart threw up there. Homer calls the waffle "Sacrilicious." This scene, inspired by some melted caramel stuck to the ceiling of the Simpsons writers' room, is one of Mirkin's and Richardson's "all time favorite" jokes.

== Cultural references ==
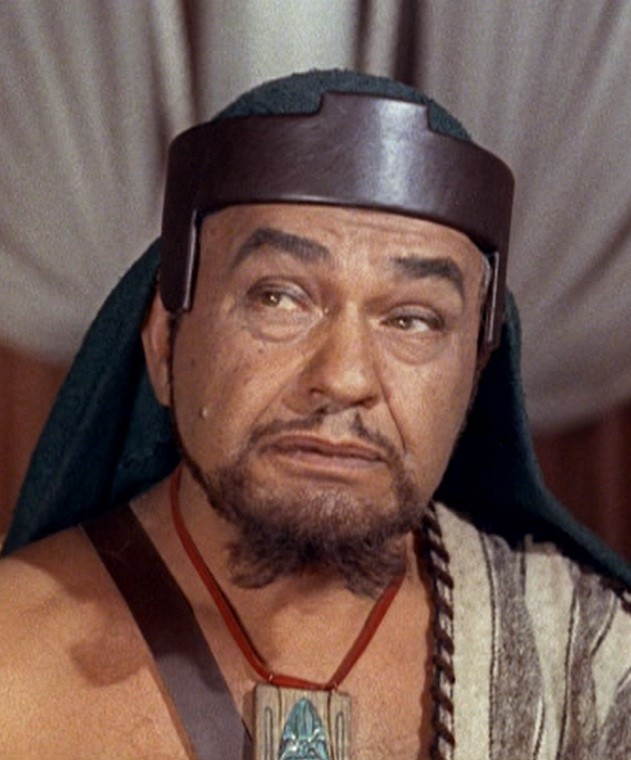
A reference is made in the episode to Edward G. Robinson's character Dathan from the 1956 film The Ten Commandments.

When Homer hears the 1978 song "Two Tickets to Paradise" by Eddie Money on the radio, he sings along without realizing the song applies to his predicament. As Homer is eating nachos at the football game, he improvises the song "Nacho Man", a reference to Village People's 1978 song "Macho Man". When Rod and Todd are watching television in the Flanders's living room, a print of Leonardo da Vinci's painting The Last Supper can be seen behind them. The homeless shelter that Homer and Flanders visit is called Helter Shelter, a reference to the 1968 song "Helter Skelter" by The Beatles. Ned recognizes Moe from reading to sick children at the hospital; in a cutaway, he's shown reading to a child from My Friend Flicka. At the homeless shelter, he reads to the homeless from Little Women. In the scene, Moe reads what purports to be the final line of the book: "They were no longer little girls...they were Little Women". The line makes Moe weep. Many viewers did not realise that this was intended as a joke, as the line does not appear in the original work.

== Reception ==
In its original American broadcast, "Homer Loves Flanders" finished 43rd in the ratings for the week of March 14–20, 1994, with a Nielsen rating of 10.9. The episode was the third highest-rated show on the Fox network that week, following Beverly Hills, 90210 and Melrose Place.

Since airing, the episode has received mostly positive reviews from television critics.

In 2007, Patrick Enright of Today called the episode his eighth favorite of the show. He praised the references to Terminator 2 in the episode, as well as Lisa's self-referential quote about how, "by next week, we'll be back to where we started from, ready for another wacky adventure." The authors I Can't Believe It's a Bigger and Better Updated Unofficial Simpsons Guide, Gary Russell and Gareth Roberts, thought the episode had "some great existential musings" from Lisa. They added that it also "contains some nice moments highlighting the differences between the Simpsons and the Flanders."

DVD Movie Guide's Colin Jacobson said: "I always remembered ["Homer Loves Flanders"] to be a great episode – and I recalled correctly. Sure, the show goes with a less than creative presence[sic]; it’s an easy story to make characters behave in atypical ways. However, the development of the theme is terrific, as we learn the friendship of Homer Simpson is worse than the antagonism of Homer Simpson." DVD Talk gave the episode a 4 out of 5 score. Patrick Bromley of DVD Verdict gave the episode a B− grade, claiming the "rather large dose of sentimentality" and "fewer moments of absurdity" in the episode gave it "the feeling that it belongs in one of the series' earlier seasons". The Orlando Sentinel's Gregory Hardy named it the second best episode of the show with a sports theme.

Nathan Rabin notes the episode's self-referential humor. Lisa muses that "It seems every week the Simpsons go through a situation like this. My suggestion is to just ride it out, make the occasional smart-aleck quip, and next week, we'll return right to where we were, ready for another wacky adventure." Rabin writes "The ending of the episode pays off this speech with a denouement that once again finds Homer enraged at Flanders and the family faced with a premise that plays like a parody of hacky sitcom plots because it is: Homer inheriting a haunted house from his uncle Boris. I’ve long found meta-textual gags on The Simpsons to be a bit of a crutch, as a way of winking at the hoariness of the sitcom form and its conventions while recycling them, and 'Homer Loves Flanders' is strong enough that it doesn’t need that kind of an out." He praises the character development: "Ned Flanders has the patience of a saint. He is saintly in many other respects as well. In a comedy world where true believers like Ned are generally caricatured as hypocrites, Ned is the real deal, a genuinely decent man whose excessively public faith represents an honest belief in Christ and his teachings and a sincere love for his fellow man. That’s an altogether more subversive, challenging and rewarding take on Christian fundamentalism than lazily ridiculing bible-thumpers as phonies whose public protestations of holiness clash with their private indiscretions. Ned is such a thoroughly good dude that when, in the climactic moment of 'Homer Loves Flanders', Homer climactically tells Flanders' fellow parishioners that if everyone was like Ned there would be no need for heaven, since there would be heaven on earth, it rings true."

=== Legacy ===
A scene in the episode where Homer backs into Ned's hedges became an Internet meme referred to as "Homer Simpson Backs Into the Bushes", "Homer Backs Into Bushes", "Homer Simpson Backing Into a Hedge", and other, similar names (also referred to as simply the Homer Simpson bush meme) in the 2010s, and a GIF of the meme was part of the 2014 installation The Reaction GIF: Moving Image as Gesture at the Museum of the Moving Image. The scene was later referenced in the season 30 episode, "The Girl on the Bus" where Homer texts Lisa a GIF of himself going into the hedge. The scene was later referenced again in the season 32 episode, "Wad Goals", where Bart tells his friends "I've seen my dad do this" immediately before showing them how to back into a hedge. In the season 34 episode "Treehouse of Horror XXXIII", during a Westworld parody segment named Simpsons World, multiple tourists heckle an android Homer to do the "bush meme" by pushing him into a hedge, Bart then removes Homer's inability to intentionally harm humans, causing him to push the tourists into the hedge, killing them and commenting "I'm so sick of that stupid hedge!".
