= Dan McGrath =

American television writer (1964–2025)

- Born: July 20, 1964; New York City, U.S.
- Died: November 14, 2025 (aged 61); New York City, U.S.
- Education: Harvard University
- Occupations: Writer; producer; stage director; tutor
- Years active: 1983–2025

Daniel Anthony McGrath (July 20, 1964 – November 14, 2025) was an American television writer, educator and stage director. He is known primarily for his work as a writer/producer for several TV series including The Simpsons, Saturday Night Live, King of the Hill, Gravity Falls, and Mission Hill.

McGrath was nominated for an Emmy for his work on Saturday Night Live and later won an Emmy for his work on The Simpsons. He was nominated for a Writers Guild Award for the King of the Hill episode "Life: A Loser's Manual".

== Early life ==
McGrath was born on July 20, 1964, and raised in Brooklyn, New York, the son of Gerard McGrath, a machinist and electrician, and Eleanor McGrath, a homemaker. He was of Irish, Hungarian, and Scandinavian descent.

He attended Regis High School and Harvard University, where he studied Chinese and Japanese history and politics. He failed all his Japanese-language courses, but was active as a writer, editor and cartoonist at The Harvard Lampoon, where he was twice elected a vice president, and ultimately graduated with honors. At Harvard, he was a prolific stage director: he directed Richard III in a dining hall, using only the tables and chairs as a set, and he once covered the entire Loeb Main Stage in dirt for Richard's Cork Leg.

While at Harvard, McGrath also designed computer games at MIT and co-founded (along with Bill Rauch, Lisa Latham, Amy Brenneman and Dean Norris) the notorious avant-garde theatre company The Kronauer Group, which later became the Cornerstone Theater Company.

He worked in hospitals, public clinics and emergency rooms for a number of years, and then moved onto Hollywood.

== Television ==
McGrath started his television career as a writer at Saturday Night Live, where he was a frequent collaborator with Adam Sandler and Chris Farley. He then joined the writing staff of The Simpsons, contributing pieces like "The Devil and Homer Simpson" and "Time and Punishment" (both co-written with Greg Daniels) and "Bart of Darkness". He has received credits as a story editor for 50 Simpsons episodes which were released from 1992 to 1994, as well as producing credit for 24 episodes which released from 1996 to 1998.

Entertainment Weekly called the "Time and Punishment" segment "one of the most beautifully random moments in [The] Simpsons history". The A.V. Club called McGrath's "Boy-Scoutz 'n the Hood" episode "pretty much comic gold from start to finish" and "utterly fantastic" and said it "features one of the greatest, most true-to-life depictions of a bender/drug binge in television history". They also said McGrath's episode "Bart of Darkness" "is a hilarious episode that restricts a Simpsons' go-to—Bart as hell-raiser—and mines much of its humor from the cruelties of childhood."

After getting fired twice from The Simpsons, he later worked on Mission Hill, where he wrote the episode "Plan 9 from Mission Hill (or I Married a Gay Man from Outer Space)", which didn't air on The WB (as The WB canceled the show after the episode "Unemployment, Part 1 [or Brother's Big Boner]"), but did air as the last episode on Cartoon Network's Adult Swim block. He also worked on Gravity Falls, The PJs, and an eight year stint at King of the Hill, contributing episodes like "Full Metal Dust Jacket" and "The Minh Who Knew Too Much". The A.V. Club called "The Minh Who Knew Too Much" episode "terrifyingly silly and haphazard".

== Teaching ==
McGrath later taught a course in "Comedy and Cultural Theory" at The Center for Fiction in Brooklyn.

== Death ==
McGrath died from a stroke at a hospital in Brooklyn, New York, on November 14, 2025, at the age of 61.

== Writing credits ==
=== The Simpsons episodes ===
McGrath wrote (or co-wrote) the following episodes:

- "Treehouse of Horror IV" (co-wrote "The Devil and Homer Simpson" with Greg Daniels) (1993)
- "Boy-Scoutz 'n the Hood" (1993)
- "Bart of Darkness" (1994)
- "Treehouse of Horror V" (co-wrote "Time and Punishment" with Greg Daniels) (1994)

=== Mission Hill episodes ===
- "Kevin Loves Weirdie" (2002)
- "Plan 9 from Mission Hill (or I Married a Gay Man from Outer Space)" (2002)

=== King of the Hill episodes ===
- "Full Metal Dust Jacket" (2003)
- "Be True To Your Fool" (2003)
- "Livin' on Reds, Vitamin C and Propane" (2003)
- "Girl, You'll Be a Giant Soon" (2004)
- "Care-Takin' Care of Business" (2005)
- "Smoking and the Bandit" (2005)
- "Blood and Sauce" (2007)
- "The Minh Who Knew Too Much" (2007)
- "Life: A Loser's Manual" (2008)
- "A Bill Full of Dollars" (2008)
- "The Boy Can't Help It" (2009)
