= Homer Goes to College =

- The Simpsons episode
- Episode no.: Season 5 Episode 3
- Directed by: Jim Reardon
- Written by: Conan O'Brien
- Production code: 1F02
- Original air date: October 14, 1993

Episode features
- Couch gag: The family sits on the couch, only to be squashed by The Foot of Cupid from Monty Python's Flying Circus.
- Commentary: Matt Groening; James L. Brooks; David Mirkin; Conan O'Brien; Jim Reardon; David Silverman

Episode chronology
← Previous "Cape Feare"	Next → "Rosebud"
- The Simpsons season 5

"Homer Goes to College" is the third episode of the fifth season of the American animated television series The Simpsons. It originally aired on the Fox network in the United States on October 14, 1993. In the episode, Homer causes a nuclear meltdown during a plant inspection and is required to study nuclear physics at college. When Homer neglects his studies, the college dean has three nerds tutor him. Homer enlists the nerds' help in playing a prank on a rival college, leading to their expulsion. Homer invites them to live with the Simpsons, who soon grow tired of their new housemates.

The episode was written by Conan O'Brien and directed by Jim Reardon. It was the third and final episode of the show that O'Brien received sole writing credit, having previously written the episodes "New Kid on the Block" and "Marge vs. the Monorail", both from season 4. O'Brien would leave the series halfway through the production of the season to host his own show, Late Night with Conan O'Brien. He had been working on this episode when he was informed that he had received the job and was forced to walk out on his contract.

The episode contains several references to the film Animal House as well as Monty Python and the Holy Grail, Star Trek and the song "Louie Louie" by The Kingsmen, which plays during the end credits. Since airing, the episode has received mostly positive reviews from television critics. It acquired a Nielsen rating of 11.3, and it was tied with Beverly Hills, 90210 as the highest-rated show on the Fox network the week it aired.

Executives at Fox wanted "Homer Goes to College" to be the season premiere, but the writing staff felt that "Homer's Barbershop Quartet" was a better choice because of George Harrison's guest appearance in that episode.

== Plot ==
During the Nuclear Regulatory Commission's surprise test of worker competence at the Springfield Nuclear Power Plant, Homer is placed in a test module van that simulates a power surge. He has no idea what to do, so he pushes buttons at random and somehow causes a nuclear meltdown, even though the van contains no nuclear material. Mr. Burns attempts to bribe the NRC officials (having successfully bribed Mayor Quimby with a $5,000 fur coat); they refuse the bribe and inform Burns that Homer's job requires college training in nuclear physics. After Homer is rejected by every school he applies to, Mr. Burns helps him enroll at Springfield University, since he is a member of the admissions board there. However, Homer neglects his studies; having seen many teen films about college, Homer believes that at college, academics do not matter, life is full of pranks and partying, and that every college dean is a grouchy old man. Homer continues to hold these beliefs even after meeting the university's Dean Peterson, a friendly, laid-back young man who used to be the bass player for The Pretenders.

Homer is asked to demonstrate how a proton accelerator works and causes a nuclear meltdown in class. Dean Peterson recommends Homer receive tutoring. When his tutors -- three nerds named Benjamin, Doug, and Gary -- try to tutor Homer, he refuses to engage with them. Instead, Homer and Bart convince the nerds to pull a prank on rival college Springfield A&M by kidnapping the rival college's mascot, a pig named Sir Oinkcelot. When the pig falls ill after Homer feeds him malt liquor, the nerds are blamed for the incident and expelled.

Homer invites Benjamin, Doug, and Gary to move in with his family. Their presence quickly disrupts the normal family routine. When Marge orders Homer to evict them, he tries to get them re-admitted to college with an elaborate hoax: he will nearly run down Peterson with his car, but the nerds will push him from harm's way at the last moment, hopefully reinstating them. The plan backfires when Homer's car actually hits the dean, seriously injuring him. At the hospital, Homer apologizes to Dean Peterson and implores him to reinstate Benjamin, Doug, and Gary as students. Dean Peterson agrees, and the nerds move back into their old dormitory room. Homer fails his final exam, so the nerds hack into the school's student records and change his grade to an A+. However, Marge finds out and forces Homer to take the course again to set a good example for Bart and Lisa.

== Production ==
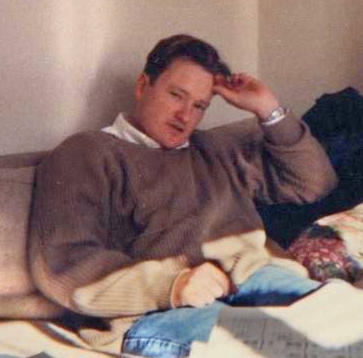
"Homer Goes to College" was the final episode of the show for which Conan O'Brien received a sole writing credit.

"Homer Goes to College" was the final episode of the show for which Conan O'Brien received sole writing credit; his final writing credit altogether was for the episode "Treehouse of Horror IV", which he co-wrote with five other writers. O'Brien would leave the series halfway through the production of the season to host his own show, Late Night with Conan O'Brien on NBC. O'Brien was informed that he had been hired by NBC not long before the recording session for this episode began, and he was forced to walk out on his contract. The concept of the episode was that Homer attends college, but bases his entire understanding of what college is on "bad Animal House rip-off movies". O'Brien mentioned in the DVD commentary that the antics of the characters Benjamin, Doug, and Gary were based on three "incredible nerds" who lived in the same college dormitory as O'Brien.

The Fox Network executives had wanted the season premiere to be "Homer Goes to College" because it was an Animal House parody. However, the writers felt that "Homer's Barbershop Quartet" would be a better episode because of George Harrison's involvement.

During the episode, Homer lights his framed high school diploma on fire, unintentionally setting fire to his living room, while distractedly singing "I am so smart! S-M-R-T... I mean S-M-A-R-T!" This blunder was unscripted; during the recording session, Dan Castellaneta was singing the song and accidentally misspelled "smart". The writers decided it was much funnier that way, because it seemed like something Homer would do, so they left the apparent blooper in. The song has since become a fan favorite.

Jim Reardon directed the episode and has noted he remembers the episode for several scenes in which the action is viewed through windows, such as when Homer prank calls the dean. The animators were short on time, so for the design of Gary they took an earlier drawing of director Rich Moore and made him African-American.

== Cultural references ==
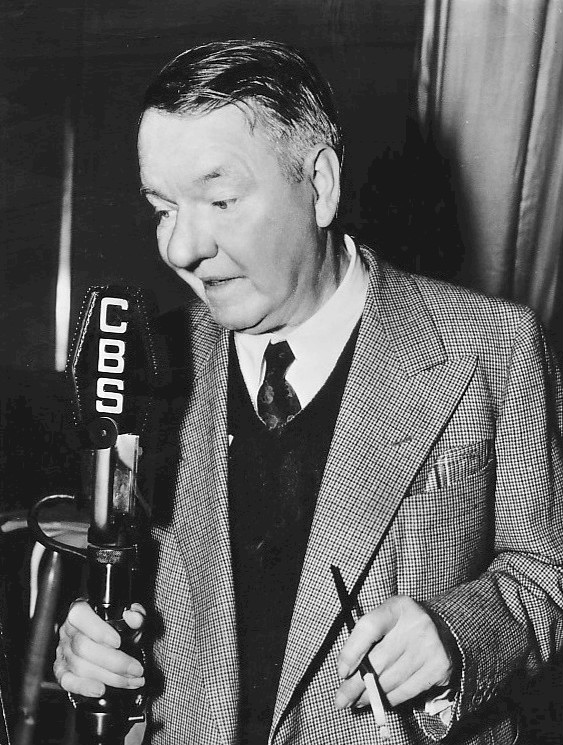
Homer has a poster of comedian W. C. Fields hanging on his wall.

The episode contains several references to the film Animal House, including the song "Louie Louie" by The Kingsmen, which plays throughout the film. The couch gag with the huge pink foot squashing the Simpsons is a reference to The Foot of Cupid from the television series Monty Python's Flying Circus. The film Monty Python and the Holy Grail is also referenced when Benjamin, Doug, and Gary imitate the Knights who say Ni. They play Dungeons & Dragons, hold arguments over Star Trek, and their room number is 222, a reference to the television series Room 222. Homer has posters of Albert Einstein and W. C. Fields hanging on his wall. The books that Homer cites as his favorites are TV Guide, Son of Sniglet and Katharine Hepburn's Me. Bart scratching the chalkboard to get everyone's attention is a reference to the film Jaws. The episode contains the first reference to the Internet on The Simpsons, as "computer signals" being sent between the Nerds and MIT. A picture in the dorm showing four men wearing silver dome hats resembles the '80s new wave band Devo. The phrases the nerds say when Homer greets them ("Intruder Alert", and "Stop the Humanoid!") are from the 1980 arcade game Berzerk. Lisa tells Homer: "Some nerds of note include...popcorn magnate Orville Redenbacher, rock star David Byrne, and supreme court justice David Souter." Homer replies "Oh, not Souter!"; his apparent familiarity with Supreme Court Justices is a running gag.

Mr. Burns asks Homer to "find the jade monkey" in a reference to the film The Maltese Falcon. He also offers the nuclear inspectors a washer and dryer or the contents of a mysterious box, which parodies the gameshow Let's Make a Deal. Mr. Burns' escape pod resembles the one used by R2-D2 and C-3PO in Star Wars. Mr. Burns tries to get Homer into college by using violence and hitting one of the members of the admissions committee with a baseball bat, a reference to the film The Untouchables.

== Reception ==
In its original broadcast, "Homer Goes to College" finished 44th in ratings for the week of October 11 to October 17, 1993, with a Nielsen rating of 11.3, and was viewed in 10.5 million households. It was tied with Beverly Hills, 90210 as the highest-rated show on the Fox network that week.

The episode has received mostly positive reviews from television critics. The authors of the book I Can't Believe It's a Bigger and Better Updated Unofficial Simpsons Guide, Gary Russell and Gareth Roberts, wrote: "Homer at his most excruciatingly stupid in another superb episode—his attitude to the college's 'stuffy old dean' (who was, in fact, bassist for The Pretenders) is a joy." Thomas Rozwadowski of the Green Bay Press-Gazette listed Homer's line "Curly, straight. Curly, straight" whilst he torments the pig as "instantly memorable". In 2019, Consequence ranked it the top episode on its list of top 30 Simpsons episodes.

DVD Movie Guide's Colin Jacobson commented that it did not "quite live up to its two predecessors "Homer's Barbershop Quartet" and "Cape Feare" this year, but it remains a strong show nonetheless. Actually, it starts a little slowly but builds steam along the way. It includes some classic moments of a Homer idiocy—hard to beat him chasing squirrels with a stick—and one of the better visual gags via Burns' chair. Who can dislike a show in which Richard Nixon threatens Homer due to a drunken pig?" The episode's reference to The Untouchables was named the 13th greatest film reference in the history of the show by Total Film's Nathan Ditum.

In 2014, The Simpsons writers picked "Burning Down the Mouse" from the episode as one of their nine favorite Itchy & Scratchy episodes of all time.

Nathan Rabin writes of how the episode toys with expectations: "When it comes out that Homer still needs to pass the big test (he had conveniently forgotten that detail amidst all the pranks and stunts) he cycles his way through the kind of cramming montage that invariably ends with a proud graduate clutching an 'A' paper. However, Homer is denser than most, so even after all that cramming, he still ends up with an 'F.' In a glorious closing scene, Homer crows that at least everyone learned important lessons before his family corrects him and points out that nobody has learned any lessons at all, which is the perfect ending to a classic episode that subverts and lampoons every college movie cliché in existence."
