= Bart Gets an Elephant =

- The Simpsons episode
- Episode no.: Season 5 Episode 17
- Directed by: Jim Reardon
- Written by: John Swartzwelder
- Production code: 1F15
- Original air date: March 31, 1994

Episode features
- Chalkboard gag: "Organ transplants are best left to the professionals"
- Couch gag: The family's eyes run in with the lights off. When the lights turn on, the bodies run in and push the eyes back into their sockets.
- Commentary: Matt Groening; David Mirkin; David Silverman

Episode chronology
← Previous "Homer Loves Flanders"	Next → "Burns' Heir"
- The Simpsons season 5

"Bart Gets an Elephant" is the seventeenth episode of the fifth season of the American animated television series The Simpsons. It originally aired on the Fox network in the United States on March 31, 1994. In this episode, Bart wins a radio contest and is awarded a full-grown African elephant that he names Stampy. After Stampy wrecks the Simpsons' house and eats all the food, Homer decides to sell Stampy to an ivory dealer. Bart runs away with Stampy to save his pet, but the family finds the two at a museum exhibit, where Homer sinks into a tar pit. Homer is saved by Stampy, and so gives the elephant away to an animal refuge instead.

The episode was written by John Swartzwelder, and directed by Jim Reardon. It introduced the fictional elephant Stampy, and marks the first appearance of the recurring character Cletus Spuckler. The episode features cultural references to the songs "Sixteen Tons" and "Do-Re-Mi", and the La Brea Tar Pits cluster of tar pits located in Hancock Park in Los Angeles, California.

Since airing, the episode has received mostly positive reviews from television critics. It acquired a Nielsen rating of 10.7, and was the highest-rated show on the Fox network the week it aired.

== Plot ==
Bart wins a contest on Bill and Marty's radio show, and chooses the joke prize of a full-grown African elephant instead of the prize money. Word spreads throughout town about Bill and Marty's refusal to give Bart an elephant, leading to a flood of angry mail and letter bombs from the station's listeners. Bill and Marty's boss gives them an ultimatum: either find an elephant for Bart or lose their jobs to an automated DJ. They find an elephant and leave it on the Simpsons' front lawn.

Bart names his new elephant Stampy and ties him to a post in the backyard. Lisa complains that keeping an elephant as a pet is cruel, while Homer worries that Stampy is too expensive to keep. Initially feeding Stampy on complimentary peanuts from Moe's Tavern and leaves from a public park, Homer attempts to offset Stampy's food costs, Bart and Homer exhibit him by charging customers to pet and ride him. After still failing to cover his budget, and driving away customers by raising admission fees into the thousands, Homer and Marge decide that Stampy must go.

A representative of a game reserve tells the Simpsons that the acres of open land on the reserve would be an ideal habitat for the elephant, but Homer rejects this idea because it includes no financial profit. Mr. Blackheart, a wildlife poacher, offers to buy Stampy. Homer eagerly agrees, but Bart and Lisa disapprove because Blackheart openly admits to being an ivory dealer.

Just as Homer and Blackheart reach a deal, Bart and Stampy run off and wreak havoc throughout Springfield. Initially misled by the trail of destruction left by a tornado, the family finds them at the Springfield Tar Pits, where Homer gets stuck in a tar pit. After pulling Barney Gumble from the pit, Stampy frees Homer, who reluctantly agrees to donate the elephant to the wildlife reserve. Bart says goodbye to Stampy, who bullies the other elephants at the reserve for no apparent reason.

== Production ==
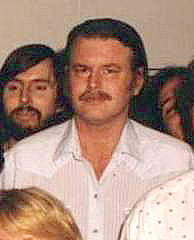
The episode was written by John Swartzwelder.

The episode was written by John Swartzwelder, and directed by Jim Reardon. The Simpsons' creator Matt Groening thought it was a "quintessential" Swartzwelder episode, and executive producer/show runner David Mirkin said it was a "fantastic job by one of the most prolific writers of the show". The most important thing to Mirkin while making the episode was to make sure that the elephant would be a "bastard" and behave rudely, unlike other animals on the show. For example, instead of putting people on his back, Stampy would put them in his mouth. Mirkin said the elephant "never quite bonds because it's a very cantankerous animal, a concept that was very important to this episode". Stampy has since been used several times in jokes later on in the series. For example, Stampy made an appearance in the season nine episode "Miracle on Evergreen Terrace" in one of Bart's dreams, and in the season fourteen episode "Large Marge", where he is used by Bart in a stunt to help Krusty the Clown win back his popularity. Stampy appeared briefly in The Simpsons Movie, where he tries to break down the giant glass dome lowered over Springfield. The episode also introduces the character Cletus Spuckler. He is shown as one of the "slack-jawed yokels" gawking at Stampy in the Simpson family's backyard. Cletus is not named in the episode, so the staff simply referred to him as the Slack-Jawed Yokel.

== Cultural references ==
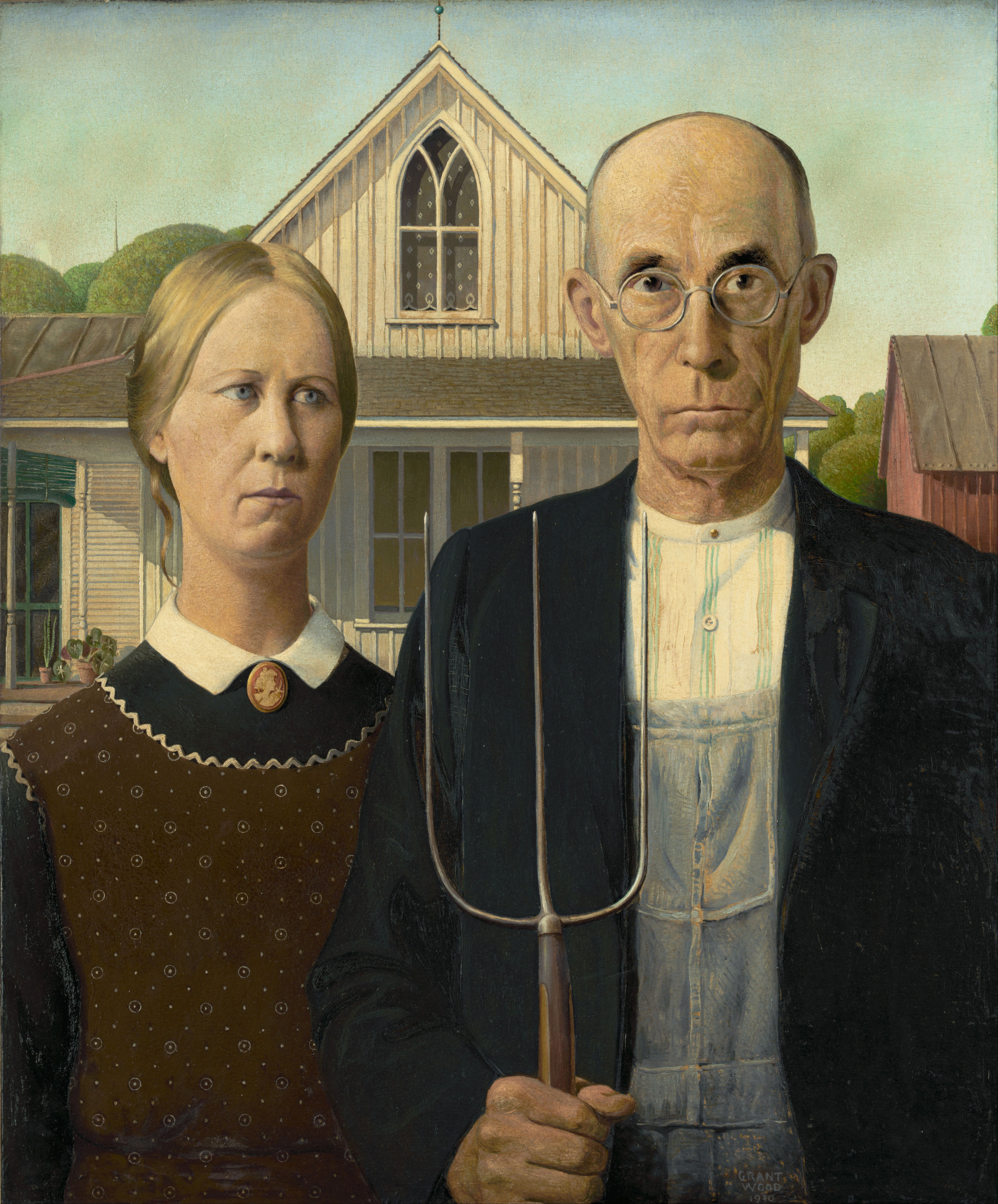
By cleaning too hard, Bart wipes the paint off Grant Wood's American Gothic

The Springfield Tar Pits are inspired by the La Brea Tar Pits located in Hancock Park in Los Angeles, California. The museum in the background of the scene where Homer sinks into one of the tar pits resembles the George C. Page Museum of the La Brea Discoveries. When Stampy runs away, he passes the Republican National Convention, with people cheering, and then he passes the Democratic National Convention, with people booing. This is a reference to the fact that an elephant is the symbol of the Republican Party. Homer uses Mr. Cleanser, a parody of the detergent brand Mr. Clean, to clean the basement. As Bart cleans, he accidentally scrubs the paint off an American Gothic painting hanging on the wall. Under the paint is a message signed by the painter, Grant Wood, reading: "If you can read this, you scrubbed too hard," implying the Simpsons stole the original painting.

The scene in which Stampy's eye is seen through a window of the Simpson family's house is similar to a scene with a Tyrannosaurus rex in Jurassic Park (1993). While cleaning the house, Marge turns on the radio and the song "Sixteen Tons" by Merle Travis is heard. Bart says "You said it, Ernie", a reference to the version by Tennessee Ernie Ford. The scene in which Homer crashes his car into a deer statue at the Springfield Tar Pits parodies the lyrics to the Sound of Music song "Do-Re-Mi" as Homer shouts: "D'oh!" followed by Lisa: "A deer!" and Marge: "A female deer!" Homer reads an old TV Guide in which the synopsis of an episode of Gomer Pyle, U.S.M.C. reads "Gomer upsets Sgt. Carter", a possible synopsis for every episode of that series. He also imagines the episode with a thought of both Carter and Pyle standing next to each other. Carter yells, "Pyle!" and Pyle responds, "Shazam!" As Stampy wreaks havoc throughout Springfield, Patty and Selma are sucked up by a tornado and fly through the air in rocking chairs, similar Ms. Gulch in The Wizard of Oz (1939).

== Reception ==
=== Ratings ===
In its original broadcast, "Bart Gets an Elephant" finished forty-second in the ratings for the week of March 28 to April 20, 1994, with a Nielsen rating of 10.7, equivalent to 10 million viewing households. It was the highest-rated show on the Fox network that week.

=== Critical reception ===
The episode won an Environmental Media Award in the Best Television Episodic Comedy category, which has been awarded every year since 1991 to the best television episode with an environmental message. The episode has also received a Genesis Award in the Best Television Comedy Series category. The Genesis Awards are given out annually by the Humane Society of the United States "to the news and entertainment media for shining that spotlight into the darkest corners of animal abuse and exploitation."

Since airing, the episode has received mostly positive reviews from television critics. The authors of the book I Can't Believe It's a Bigger and Better Updated Unofficial Simpsons Guide, Gary Russell and Gareth Roberts, wrote: "Another favourite. It's hard to explain the special appeal of this episode. Perhaps it's because Homer is so exceptionally dumb. Or perhaps because it contains the 'D'oh!' 'A deer!' 'A female deer!' gag." This gag was also praised by BBC News's Mark Milne, who said: "[It] just cracks me up every time. Brilliant!"

DVD Movie Guide's Colin Jacobson thought the fifth season included "plenty of programs with potentially cheesy concepts", such as "Deep Space Homer" and "Bart Gets an Elephant". However, he thought the episode managed to "easily overcome its possible flaws" to turn into a "very fine program". Homer's line "Marge, I agree with you in theory. In theory, communism works — In theory" was Jacobson's favorite of the episode.

Patrick Bromley of DVD Verdict gave the episode a grade of A, and Bill Gibron of DVD Talk gave it a score of 4 out of 5.
