= Jim Reardon =

American animation director and screenwriter

- Education: California Institute of the Arts (BFA)
- Occupations: Animation director; screenwriter
- Years active: 1986–present
- Known for: The Simpsons; WALL-E; Wreck-It Ralph; Zootopia; Ralph Breaks the Internet

Jim Reardon is an American animation director and screenwriter. He is best known for his work on the animated TV series The Simpsons. He has directed over 30 episodes of the series and was credited as a supervising director for seasons 9 through 15. He has been described by Ralph Bakshi as "one of the best cartoon writers in the business".

== Early life and education ==
Reardon grew up in Seaside, Oregon, graduating from Seaside High School in 1983. His father died when Reardon was young, so Reardon picked up odd jobs to help support his mother and two sisters. Reardon graduated from California Institute of the Arts with a BFA degree in 1987. One of his student projects, the satirical cartoon Bring Me the Head of Charlie Brown (1986), has become a cult classic.

== Career ==
=== Early career ===
Reardon was hired by John Kricfalusi as a writer on Mighty Mouse: The New Adventures and later worked on Tiny Toon Adventures.

Reardon worked for Walt Disney Animation Studios for nearly a decade. Prior to that, he briefly supervised the storyboard department at Pixar and co-wrote the studio's ninth feature film WALL-E with Andrew Stanton, which was released on June 27, 2008. He was nominated for an Academy Award for Best Original Screenplay for WALL-E at the 81st Academy Awards. Reardon would later co-write and supervise the story of the 2012 Walt Disney Animation Studios film, Wreck-It Ralph. He has won 5 Primetime Emmys, all of which were for his work on The Simpsons.

=== Filmography ===
- Bring Me the Head of Charlie Brown (1986) – director
- Mighty Mouse: The New Adventures (1987–88) – writer, storyboard artist, director
- Christmas in Tattertown (1988) – writer, layout artist
- The Butter Battle Book (1989) - storyboard artist
- Tiny Toon Adventures (1990) – writer
- The Simpsons (1990–2004) – director (seasons 2–15), supervising director (seasons 9–15), storyboard consultant (seasons 16–20)
  - List of The Simpsons episodes
    - "Itchy & Scratchy & Marge"
    - "Bart's Dog Gets an "F""
    - "Brush with Greatness"
    - "When Flanders Failed"
    - "Treehouse of Horror II"
    - "Saturdays of Thunder"
    - "Homer at the Bat"
    - "Dog of Death"
    - "Bart's Friend Falls in Love"
    - "Homer the Heretic"
    - "Mr. Plow"
    - "Duffless"
    - "Marge in Chains"
    - "Homer Goes to College"
    - "Homer the Vigilante"
    - "Bart Gets an Elephant"
    - "Bart of Darkness"
    - "Treehouse of Horror V"
    - "Homer the Great"
    - "Lisa's Wedding"
    - "Lemon of Troy"
    - "King-Size Homer"
    - "Bart the Fink"
    - "22 Short Films About Springfield"
    - "Burns, Baby Burns"
    - "El Viaje Misterioso de Nuestro Jomer (The Mysterious Voyage of Homer)"
    - "My Sister, My Sitter"
    - "Homer's Enemy"
    - "The City of New York vs. Homer Simpson"
    - "Trash of the Titans"
    - "Thirty Minutes over Tokyo"
    - "Alone Again, Natura-Diddily"
    - "Treehouse of Horror XII"
    - "Large Marge"
    - "Simple Simpson"
- WALL-E (2008) – screenwriter, story supervisor
- Wreck-It Ralph (2012) – story writer, story supervisor
- Zootopia (2016) – story writer, head of story
- Ralph Breaks the Internet (2018) – story writer, director of story
- Vivo (2021) – co-producer
- Spellbound (2024) – additional literary materials
- Swapped (2026) – additional literary materials
