= The Simpsons season 7 =

Season of television series

The Simpsons
- Season 7
- DVD cover featuring Marge Simpson, Lisa Simpson, Bart Simpson, Maggie Simpson and Homer Simpson
- Showrunners: Bill Oakley; Josh Weinstein (21 episodes); David Mirkin (4 episodes)
- No. of episodes: 25

Release
- Original network: Fox
- Original release: September 17, 1995 – May 19, 1996

Season chronology
- ← Previous; Season 6 Next → Season 8

The seventh season of the American animated sitcom The Simpsons aired on Fox between September 17, 1995, and May 19, 1996. The showrunners for the seventh production season were Bill Oakley and Josh Weinstein who would executive produce 21 episodes this season. David Mirkin executive produced the remaining four, including two hold overs that were produced for the previous season. The season was nominated for two Primetime Emmy Awards, including Outstanding Animated Program and won an Annie Award for Best Animated Television Program. The DVD box set was released in Region 1 on December 13, 2005, Region 2 on January 30, 2006, and Region 4 on March 22, 2006. The set was released in two different forms: a Marge-shaped box and also a standard rectangular-shaped box in which the theme is a movie premiere.

== Production ==
The season was the first executively produced by Bill Oakley and Josh Weinstein, who had written episodes for previous seasons. They were chosen partly because they had been with the show since the third season and understood many of its dynamics. When they took over the series they wanted many of the episodes to be realistic ones that focused more on the five members of the Simpson family, exploring their feelings and emotions towards each other. They also wanted to produce a Treehouse of Horror episode, episodes about Sideshow Bob, Itchy & Scratchy and several "format-bending" episodes such as "22 Short Films About Springfield". Their preferred choice of guest stars were those with unique and interesting voices, and several of their guest stars were "old grizzled men with distinctive voices" such as R. Lee Ermey, Donald Sutherland, Kirk Douglas and Lawrence Tierney.

David Mirkin, who had been executive producer for the previous two seasons, was credited as a consulting producer for the seventh season but also executive produced the episodes "Who Shot Mr. Burns? (Part Two)", "Radioactive Man", "Lisa the Vegetarian" and "Team Homer". Steve Tompkins, Dan Greaney, Richard Appel and Rachel Pulido received their first writing credits while Spike Feresten and Jack Barth received their only writing credits this season. Although the majority of the writing staff stayed on for the next season, both Greg Daniels and Brent Forrester received their last writing credits during season seven. Jon Vitti, who had left following the fourth season, returned to write "Home Sweet Homediddly-Dum-Doodily" as well as "The Simpsons 138th Episode Spectacular". Wes Archer, a long-time director for The Simpsons who helped define the look of the show, left following this season. Dominic Polcino and Mike B. Anderson, who had previously worked on the show as part of the animation staff, both directed their first episodes.

Doris Grau, script supervisor for the show and voice of Lunchlady Doris died on December 30, 1995. The episode "Team Homer", which aired eight days later, was one of the last episodes to feature her voice and featured a dedication to her. After that, Lunchlady Doris had speaking parts in the season nine episode "Lisa's Sax", which Grau had recorded before her death. From season nine until season eighteen, she appeared only as a background character but had a speaking role in "The Mook, the Chef, the Wife and Her Homer" where she was voiced by Tress MacNeille.

The season started off with the heavily publicized "Who Shot Mr. Burns? (Part Two)", which was the resolution to the first part, which had been a cliffhanger. It was preceded by "Springfield's Most Wanted", a TV special hosted by John Walsh, host of America's Most Wanted and was parody of Walsh's television series, this special was designed to help people find out who shot Mr. Burns, by laying out the potential clues and identifying the possible suspects. The special was criticized for taking the publicity of the episode too far. Several critics said the special tainted Walsh's credibility and was described as gimmicky, tacky and "blatant groveling for viewers".

The episode "Lisa the Vegetarian" features one of the few permanent character changes in the series when Lisa officially becomes a vegetarian. The episode had been pitched by David S. Cohen and the producers felt it would be a surefire way to get former Beatle Paul McCartney to guest star as he was the only living member of the group who had not done so. McCartney agreed, but only on the condition that Lisa stay a vegetarian and not revert. "22 Short Films About Springfield" has twelve credited writers, the most of any episode of the series. The episode features multiple stories about different characters. To decide who would write each of the segments, all of the writers chose their top three favorite characters and put them into a hat, the names were drawn out and the writers were assigned their parts and Greg Daniels put all of the segments together and ordered them. Two more episodes, "You Only Move Twice" and "El Viaje Misterioso de Nuestro Jomer (The Mysterious Voyage of Homer)" were produced as part of the season seven (3Fxx) production run, but both aired the following season.

The episode "22 Short Films About Springfield" was originally written for being the pilot episode of a potential spin-off series entitled Springfield Stories or simply Springfield. The proposed show was planned to be focused on the town in general, rather than the Simpson family. Every week would be a different scenario: three short stories, an adventure with young Homer or a story about a background character that was not tied into the Simpson family at all. The idea never came to anything, as Groening realized that the staff did not have the manpower to produce another show as well as The Simpsons.

Two episodes from this season used digital ink and paint rather than cels: "Radioactive Man" and "The Simpsons 138th Episode Spectacular." These were simply experiments with the technique, and the series would test the method twice more ("Tennis the Menace" and "Treehouse of Horror XIII") before fully converting with "The Great Louse Detective."

== Voice cast & characters ==
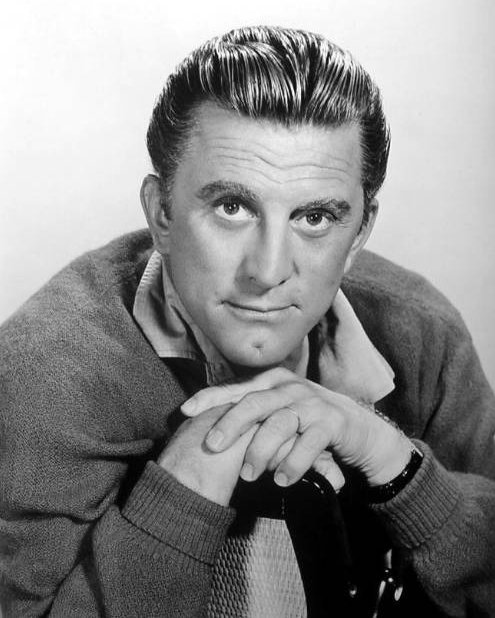
Kirk Douglas guest-starred as Chester J. Lampwick in "The Day the Violence Died".

The season saw the introduction of two new recurring characters: Disco Stu, and Brandine Spuckler.

=== Main cast ===
- Dan Castellaneta as Homer Simpson, Grampa Simpson, Krusty the Clown, Sideshow Mel, Groundskeeper Willie, Mayor Quimby, Barney Gumble, Kodos, Blue-Haired Lawyer, Hans Moleman, Arnie Pye, Louie, Jake the Barber, Santa's Little Helper, and various others
- Julie Kavner as Marge Simpson, Patty Bouvier, Selma Bouvier and various others
- Nancy Cartwright as Bart Simpson, Nelson Muntz, Ralph Wiggum, Todd Flanders, Rod Flanders, Kearney, Maggie Simpson and various others
- Yeardley Smith as Lisa Simpson
- Hank Azaria as Chief Wiggum, Lou, Moe Szyslak, Colossos, Superintendent Chalmers, Dr. Nick, Apu, Kirk Van Houten, Captain McCallister, Cletus Spuckler, Carl Carlson, Snake Jailbird, Old Jewish Man, Professor Frink, Luigi Risotto, Disco Stu, Comic Book Guy, Bumblebee Man and various others
- Harry Shearer as Waylon Smithers, Mr. Burns, Kent Brockman, Eddie, Dave Shutton, Principal Skinner, Jasper Beardsley, Fallout Boy, Radioactive Man, Rainier Wolfcastle, Otto Mann, Ned Flanders, Reverend Lovejoy, Dr. Hibbert, Kang, Lenny Leonard, Scratchy, George H. W. Bush, Jebediah Springfield, Mr. Prince, Sanjay Nahasapeemapetilon, Herman Hermann and various others

=== Recurring ===
- Doris Grau as Lunchlady Doris
- Pamela Hayden as Milhouse Van Houten, Dolph, Jimbo Jones, Janey Powell and various others
- Tress MacNeille as Agnes Skinner, Mrs. Glick, Brandine Spuckler, Manjula Nahasapeemapetilon and various others
- Maggie Roswell as Luann Van Houten, Maude Flanders, Helen Lovejoy, Miss Hoover, Brittany Brockman and various others
- Russi Taylor as Martin Prince, Sherri and Terri, Uter Zorker and various others

=== Guest stars ===
- Phil Hartman as Troy McClure, Lionel Hutz, Fat Tony, and the hospital board chairman (9 episodes)
- Marcia Wallace as Edna Krabappel (6 episodes)
- Tito Puente as himself ("Who Shot Mr. Burns? (Part Two)")
- Mickey Rooney as himself ("Radioactive Man")
- Frank Welker as various animals ("Home Sweet Homediddly-Dum-Doodily")
- Paul and Linda McCartney as themselves ("Lisa the Vegetarian")
- Paul Anka as himself ("Treehouse of Horror VI")
- Glenn Close as Mona Simpson ("Mother Simpson")
- Harry Morgan as Bill Gannon ("Mother Simpson")
- Kelsey Grammer as Sideshow Bob ("Sideshow Bob's Last Gleaming")
- R. Lee Ermey as Colonel Leslie Hapablap ("Sideshow Bob's Last Gleaming")
- Lawrence Tierney as Don Brodka ("Marge Be Not Proud")
- Tom Kite as himself ("Scenes from the Class Struggle in Springfield")
- Bob Newhart as himself ("Bart the Fink")
- Donald Sutherland as Hollis Hurlbut ("Lisa the Iconoclast")
- Kirk Douglas as Chester J. Lampwick ("The Day the Violence Died")
- Alex Rocco as Roger Meyers Jr. ("The Day the Violence Died")
- Jack Sheldon as the Amendment ("The Day the Violence Died")
- Suzanne Somers as herself ("The Day the Violence Died")
- Jeff Goldblum as MacArthur Parker ("A Fish Called Selma")
- Joe Mantegna as Fat Tony ("Much Apu About Nothing")
- Peter Frampton as himself ("Homerpalooza")
- Cypress Hill as themselves ("Homerpalooza")
- The Smashing Pumpkins as themselves ("Homerpalooza")
- Sonic Youth as themselves ("Homerpalooza")
- Christina Ricci as Erin ("Summer of 4 Ft. 2")

== Reception ==
The seventh season was acclaimed by critics, and remains a fan favourite. On Rotten Tomatoes, the seventh season of The Simpsons has a 100% approval rating based on 6 critical reviews.

=== Awards ===
In 1996, "Treehouse of Horror VI" was submitted for the Primetime Emmy Award in the "Outstanding Animated Program (For Programming less than One Hour)" category. They had submitted it because it had a 3D animation sequence, which the producers felt gave them an edge. However, the episode lost to Pinky and the Brain that year, and Bill Oakley later regretted submitting the episode because he felt that a more emotional episode like "Mother Simpson", "Lisa the Vegetarian" or "Bart Sells His Soul" would have had a better chance of winning. Alf Clausen, Bill Oakley and Josh Weinstein were also nominated for "Outstanding Individual Achievement in Music and Lyrics" for the song "Señor Burns" from "Who Shot Mr. Burns? (Part Two)".

The series won several other awards for this season, including an Annie Award for "Best Animated Television Program". "Lisa the Vegetarian" won both an Environmental Media Award for "Best Television Episodic Comedy" and a Genesis Award for "Best Television Comedy Series, Ongoing Commitment". Although "Treehouse of Horror VI" failed to win the Emmy, the "Homer³" segment was awarded the Ottawa International Animation Festival grand prize.

In 1996, The Simpsons became the first animated series to win a Peabody Award, and won it "for providing exceptional animation and stinging social satire, both commodities which are in extremely short supply in television today."

At the 12th annual Television Critics Association Awards, the seventh season of the show was nominated for 'Outstanding Achievement in Comedy,' but lost to Frasier.

== Episodes ==
No. overall	No. in season	Title	Directed by	Written by	Original release date	Prod. code	U.S. viewers (millions)
129	1	"Who Shot Mr. Burns? (Part Two)"	Wes Archer	Bill Oakley & Josh Weinstein	September 17, 1995	2F20	22.6
In the previous episode, Mr. Burns was shot by an unknown gunman. Mr. Smithers believes he may have shot Burns while in a drunken stupor, and turns himself in. However, it is discovered that he is innocent, so the police question several other suspects and eventually discover Simpson DNA evidence on Burns. Mr. Burns himself awakens and is only able to say "Homer Simpson". The police immediately claim Homer is a murderer, but he manages to escape. Lisa investigates the clues herself and discovers vital evidence that clears Homer but at that moment he is spotted at the hospital. Lisa, Smithers, the police and many townsfolk go to Mr. Burns' hospital room where they find Homer strangling Burns. Burns is shaken out of his daze and reveals that he was really shot by Maggie Simpson. Marge apologizes for Maggie's actions and everything returns to normal.
130	2	"Radioactive Man"	Susie Dietter	John Swartzwelder	September 24, 1995	2F17	15.7
It is decided that filming for the new Radioactive Man film will take place in Springfield and the producers decide to cast a local child in the role of Fallout Boy. Many of Springfield's children, including Bart and Milhouse, audition for the role, with the part eventually going to Milhouse. However, Milhouse decides he does not like being a star and flees the production. He refuses to return and play the role and the producers, having been bankrupted by Mayor Quimby and the townsfolk, decide to close production and leave town.
131	3	"Home Sweet Homediddly-Dum-Doodily"	Susie Dietter	Jon Vitti	October 1, 1995	3F01	14.5
Several misunderstandings at home and school cause the child welfare dept. to accuse Homer and Marge of being negligent parents. As a result, Bart, Lisa, and Maggie are taken away and put in the care of Ned Flanders and his family. To get their kids back, Homer and Marge must pass a parenting class, while Ned discovers the kids are not baptized and decides to do it himself. Homer and Marge are allowed to get their kids back and manage to stop the baptizing ceremony. Homer eventually takes the baptizing for Bart and experiences momentary religious enlightenment before returning to his original self.
132	4	"Bart Sells His Soul"	Wes Archer	Greg Daniels	October 8, 1995	3F02	14.8
While forced to clean the organ pipes after playing a prank against the church, Bart sells his soul to Milhouse for five dollars, to prove his point that a soul does not exist. Bart begins to regret it when weird things begin happening to him such as not finding cartoons funny or not accepting hugs. Meanwhile, an encounter with the Hibbert family results in Moe converting Moe's Tavern to a family restaurant to make more money. The Simpson family eat there one night and after taunting from Lisa, Bart erupts and leaves to find his soul. It turns out that Milhouse had given Bart's soul to Comic Book Guy who in turn had sold it to someone else. It turns out that it was sold to Lisa, and she gives Bart his soul back. Back at the family restaurant, Moe loses his temper and swears at a child, resulting in him losing his customers and converting back to his tavern.
133	5	"Lisa the Vegetarian"	Mark Kirkland	David X. Cohen	October 15, 1995	3F03	14.6
After a visit with a lamb at a petting zoo, Lisa decides to become a full vegetarian. She tries to draw others towards it, but her efforts are wasted. At the same time, Homer decides to throw a barbecue and Lisa is outraged when those in attendance laugh at her suggestion of eating Gazpacho. She ruins the barbecue by destroying his main host (a roasted pig) and after refusing to apologize to Homer, runs away saying Homer is a prehistoric carnivore. She goes to the Kwik-E-Mart and meets Apu who reveals he is a vegan and tells Lisa to be tolerant and not go pushing her own views on everyone else. Lisa apologizes to Homer, admitting she had no right to ruin his barbecue.
134	6	"Treehouse of Horror VI"	Bob Anderson	John Swartzwelder	October 29, 1995	3F04	19.7
134	6	"Treehouse of Horror VI"	Bob Anderson	Steve Tompkins	October 29, 1995	3F04	19.7
134	6	"Treehouse of Horror VI"	Bob Anderson	David X. Cohen	October 29, 1995	3F04	19.7
A Halloween special which is divided into three short stories: "Attack of the 50-Foot Eyesores": An ionic storm brings Springfield's oversized advertisements and billboards to life and they begin attacking the town.; "Nightmare on Evergreen Terrace": In a parody of the A Nightmare on Elm Street movies, Groundskeeper Willie attacks schoolchildren in their sleep to get revenge on the parents who did not save him when he burned to death.; "Homer^{3}": While finding a hiding place while preparing for an upcoming visit from Patty and Selma, Homer steps into a portal behind a bookcase that takes him into a 3D world.
135	7	"King-Size Homer"	Jim Reardon	Dan Greaney	November 5, 1995	3F05	17.0
Unhappy with the Springfield Nuclear Power Plant's new exercise program, Homer decides to get on workman's comp by purposely gaining 61 pounds. He succeeds in his goal and is able to work at home. He spends a lot of his time goofing off and tries to go see a movie. When he is turned away because of his weight, Homer returns home but finds that a nuclear meltdown is about to take place at the plant because of his inattention to his work. He hijacks an ice cream truck and rushes to the plant and is able to save everyone when he falls into a tank and prevents poisonous gas from escaping. As a reward, Mr. Burns guarantees to make Homer thin again, but gives up and decides to pay for a liposuction.
136	8	"Mother Simpson"	David Silverman	Richard Appel	November 19, 1995	3F06	15.3
On a Saturday morning Homer fakes his death in order to get out of working at Mr. Burns garbage collecting event and is later forced to go to the records office to verify that he is alive. The clerk reveals that Homer's mother is still alive but Homer disagrees and goes to his mother's grave for proof. The grave actually belongs to Walt Whitman, but Homer by chance does meet with his mother. He takes her home to meet his family, but she remains silent as to where she was for the past 26 years. The family finally forces her to reveal her secret: she was part of a group of Hippie radicals in 1969 and is on the run from Mr. Burns and the FBI. Mr. Burns later discovers Mona's whereabouts and she is forced to return into hiding.
137	9	"Sideshow Bob's Last Gleaming"	Dominic Polcino	Spike Feresten	November 26, 1995	3F08	14.2
Sideshow Bob escapes from his prison guards and steals an atomic bomb at an airshow and threatens to detonate it unless Springfield gets rid of television. The city is forced to obey, but Bart and Lisa discover that Bob is hiding in the Duff blimp and confront him. Bob discovers that Krusty is still broadcasting his show, so he captures Bart and an airplane and goes on a Kamikaze mission to kill Krusty. However, he fails and is sent back to jail.
138	10	"The Simpsons 138th Episode Spectacular"	David Silverman (Note: Credited as "Pound Foolish")	Jon Vitti (Note: Credited as "Penny Wise")	December 3, 1995	3F31	16.4
Troy McClure hosts a special episode of The Simpsons that gives viewers a behind the scenes look at the show. It features clips of the series' beginnings as filler on The Tracey Ullman Show, fan mail readings, a look at the "real" Matt Groening, Simpsons trivia questions and unaired scenes from popular episodes, including the alternate ending to the "Who Shot Mr. Burns" two-parter.
139	11	"Marge Be Not Proud"	Steven Dean Moore	Mike Scully	December 17, 1995	3F07	16.7
Bart attempts to shoplift a popular video game at the local Try-N-Save but is caught by the security guard. As a result, the security guard bans Bart from Try-N-Save for rest of his life and threatens him to spend Christmas in juvenile hall if he returns. Bart manages to stop Homer and Marge from finding out, but is later dismayed when he finds out that the entire family is going to Try-N-Save for the family's Christmas photo. Bart is discovered by the security guard, who shows Homer and Marge the security footage of Bart stealing the game. Marge becomes distant and punishes Bart by banning him from family activities for his misdemeanour. Bart fears he has lost his mother's love, and decides he must regain it so he visits the Try-N-Save, and returns with a bulge in his coat. Marge confronts him, believing he was shoplifting again. She finds Bart has hidden a picture of himself bought as a Christmas present for Marge. Marge is overjoyed, and in gratitude for receiving her Christmas gift, she gives Bart his.
140	12	"Team Homer"	Mark Kirkland	Mike Scully	January 7, 1996	3F10	16.7
Homer assembles a bowling team consisting of Apu, Moe and Otto so he can play on league nights. He gets the team funding from Mr. Burns during one of his ether-induced hallucinations. The team does well until Mr. Burns discovers that he paid for them and decides to join the team. The team starts losing games but still manage to make it to the league championship where they manage to win. The team is overjoyed but Mr. Burns has a change of heart and takes the trophy for himself. Meanwhile, the students of Springfield Elementary School are forced to wear uniforms after Bart comes to school wearing a T-shirt with a shocking message on it. Note: This episode was dedicated to Doris Grau, the voice of Lunchlady Doris.
141	13	"Two Bad Neighbors"	Wes Archer	Ken Keeler	January 14, 1996	3F09	16.5
Former president George Bush moves to Springfield and Bart starts to annoy him. One day Bush loses control and spanks Bart after Bart accidentally destroys Bush's newly typed memoirs and Bush becoming fed up with Bart bothering him too much. Homer, who had been jealous of the attention Bush had been receiving, is outraged and launches a prank war. Bush eventually decides to leave Springfield and is replaced with Gerald Ford. Note: First appearance of Disco Stu.
142	14	"Scenes from the Class Struggle in Springfield"	Susie Dietter	Jennifer Crittenden	February 4, 1996	3F11	14.4
Marge finds a fancy Chanel suit at a discount outlet store, and is invited to start spending time at the local country club. Marge immediately fits in but is forced to alter her suit every day so it appears that she is always wearing a new outfit. Meanwhile, Homer discovers that he has a natural talent for golf and is challenged to a game by Mr. Burns. Meanwhile, Marge accidentally destroys her Chanel suit on the night of a gala ball where she will become a member of the club and buys a new one for thousands of dollars. She demands that her family behave themselves, but realizes that she is becoming too snobby and decides she doesn't want to join the club. Note: First appearance of Brandine Spuckler.
143	15	"Bart the Fink"	Jim Reardon	Story by : Bob Kushell; Teleplay by : John Swartzwelder	February 11, 1996	3F12	15.0
Bart unintentionally gets Krusty the Clown audited by the IRS after his attempt to obtain his signature by having him sign a check exposed Krusty's illegal tax shelter. When his financial situation worsens, Krusty fakes his death to escape from the public eye. However, Bart and Lisa find him living under an assumed identity and convince him that he needs showbusiness.
144	16	"Lisa the Iconoclast"	Mike B. Anderson	Jonathan Collier	February 18, 1996	3F13	13.4
While doing research for an essay, Lisa finds a confession written by town founder Jebediah Springfield revealing that he was a murderous pirate named Hans Sprungfeld who tried to attack George Washington and never cared about the people of Springfield. Homer decides to help Lisa get the message out, but they are arrested by the town council. Lisa claims Sprungfeld had a silver tongue so the council decides to exhume Jebediah to prove Lisa wrong. It turns out that there is no silver tongue but Lisa later discovers that it had been stolen from the grave by Hollis Hurlbut, the local historian. The two rush to reveal the truth about Jebediah, but Lisa realizes that the myth had inspired the entire town and decides to keep it a secret. Guest star: Donald Sutherland Note: Channel 4 in the United Kingdom has removed this episode from its syndication in July 2024, in the wake of the attempted assassination of Donald Trump in Butler, Pennsylvania.
145	17	"Homer the Smithers"	Steven Dean Moore	John Swartzwelder	February 25, 1996	3F14	14.1
At the advice of Mr. Burns, Smithers takes a vacation and hires Homer to be his replacement, thinking that Homer could never outshine him. However, Smithers' plan backfires when Homer's incompetence causes Burns to learn how to do things for himself resulting in the now useless Smithers losing his job as Burns' assistant. Homer decides to help Smithers get his job back, but their plan backfires and the two get into a fight in Mr. Burns' office. Burns is accidentally knocked out of a window and needs Smithers to do things for him again.
146	18	"The Day the Violence Died"	Wes Archer	John Swartzwelder	March 17, 1996	3F16	14.4
During a parade celebrating the 75th anniversary of Itchy & Scratchy, Bart meets Chester J. Lampwick, a homeless man who claims that he was the real creator of Itchy and not Roger Meyers as was previously believed. Bart helps the homeless man get royalties, but in doing so bankrupts the studio that produces Itchy & Scratchy. Bart and Lisa are upset and decide to try to help get Itchy & Scratchy back but are dismayed to discover that a different duo — Lester and Eliza — have already done so.
147	19	"A Fish Called Selma"	Mark Kirkland	Jack Barth	March 24, 1996	3F15	12.9
Troy McClure tries to save his dying career and debunk the rumors of his bizarre sexual life, by marrying Marge's sister, Selma. Selma discovers that the marriage is a sham but decides that being a sham wife is okay. However, Troy is informed by his agent that becoming a father will help his career even more but Selma refuses to bring a child into their loveless marriage and leaves.
148	20	"Bart on the Road"	Swinton O. Scott III	Richard Appel	March 31, 1996	3F17	11.8
While stuck at the DMV with Patty and Selma on "Go To Work With Your Parents Day," Bart creates a fake driver's license for himself and uses it to go on a spring break road trip with Milhouse, Nelson, and Martin. Meanwhile, Homer and Lisa bond after spending "Go To Work With Your Parents Day" together and the two have a lot of fun. Bart and his friends decide to go to the 1982 World's Fair in Knoxville but discover that their guide book is outdated and the fair ended years ago. Stuck in Knoxville with no money, Bart becomes a courier and calls Lisa for help. Lisa convinces Homer to order a nuclear console from Knoxville, thus helping Bart get home.
149	21	"22 Short Films About Springfield"	Jim Reardon	Richard Appel, David X. Cohen, Jonathan Collier, Jennifer Crittenden, Greg Daniels, Brent Forrester, Rachel Pulido, Steve Tompkins, Bill Oakley, Josh Weinstein & Matt Groening	April 14, 1996	3F18	10.5
Bart and Milhouse wonder if anything interesting happens to the citizens of Springfield, which leads to a chain of vignettes about the lives of Springfielders including Apu, Mr. Burns, Dr. Nick, Moe, Principal Skinner, Chief Wiggum, Bumblebee Man, Reverend Lovejoy, Cletus, and Comic Book Guy.
150	22	"Raging Abe Simpson and His Grumbling Grandson in 'The Curse of the Flying Hellfish'"	Jeffrey Lynch	Jonathan Collier	April 28, 1996	3F19	13.0
The relationship between Grampa and Bart deteriorates and around the same time, one of Grampa's fellow-veterans of World War II dies, leaving Mr. Burns as the only other living member of Grampa's war squad, the Flying Hellfish. In the final days of the war, the unit had discovered several paintings and agreed on a tontine, placing the paintings in a crate, and the surviving member would inherit the paintings. As Mr. Burns wants the paintings as soon as possible, he orders Grampa's assassination and hires an assassin to do the job. To escape death, Grampa moves into the Simpsons house, where the family let him live in Bart's room. Grampa reveals the secret of the treasure to Bart, and the two manage to steal Burns' key and leave to get the paintings. They succeed, but are discovered by the State Department who give the paintings back to their rightful owner.
151	23	"Much Apu About Nothing"	Susie Dietter	David X. Cohen	May 5, 1996	3F20	11.3
After a bear wanders into Evergreen Terrace, Mayor Quimby is forced to raise taxes so they can pay for a new bear patrol. When the citizens are outraged, Quimby blames illegal immigrants and creates Proposition 24, which will deport them. The family discovers that Apu is in fact an illegal immigrant and decide to help him get his citizenship. Apu succeeds and Homer gives a heartfelt speech about why Springfield should reject Prop 24, however, it still passes with 95% majority and Groundskeeper Willie is deported.
152	24	"Homerpalooza"	Wes Archer	Brent Forrester	May 19, 1996	3F21	12.9
In an attempt to show his kids how hip he is, Homer takes Bart and Lisa to the Hullabalooza music festival where Homer is hired as a sideshow freak who can withstand the force of cannonball blasts. As a result, Homer gets to go on tour with the festival and suddenly finds himself living the high life. As the tour approaches a stop in Springfield, Homer's stomach begins to hurt and he is sent to a veterinarian who advises Homer that if he performs his act one more time, his stomach will burst and he will die. Homer shrugs this news off, not wanting to lose his popularity. At first he decides to do his job, but at the last second he loses his nerve and dodges the cannonball. He is released from the festival and goes back to being not respected by his children.
153	25	"Summer of 4 Ft. 2"	Mark Kirkland	Dan Greaney	May 19, 1996	3F22	14.7
At the start of summer, Ned Flanders asks Homer to take care of his beach house in Little Pwagmattasquarmsettport. The family decide to go there and Lisa, realizing that she is not as cool as she thinks, uses the new locale as a chance to rid herself of her nerd image and becomes a surfer girl. She becomes best friends with a girl named Erin and a group of locals, but Bart becomes jealous and reveals to them that Lisa is in fact a teacher's pet. Lisa runs off crying, thinking that she has lost her new friends, but the next night they surprise her and say she was a good friend.

== DVD release ==
The Simpsons season 7 DVD digipak, special Marge head edition

The DVD boxset for season seven was released by 20th Century Fox Home Entertainment in the United States and Canada on December 13, 2005, nine years after it had completed broadcast on television. As well as every episode from the season, the DVD release features bonus material including deleted scenes, Animatics, and commentaries for every episode. After the criticism of the Season 6 set only being sold in a plastic packaging molded to look like Homer's head, which did not match the plain rectangular cardboard packagings of the first five seasons, Season 7 was offered in two packagings: A plastic packaging molded to look like Marge's head, and a standard rectangular cardboard box featuring Marge posing for a photo at a movie premiere. The menus continue the same format from the fifth and sixth seasons, and the menus use a Hollywood theme that show various characters at a movie premiere.

The Complete Seventh Season
Set Details			Special Features
25 episodes; 4-disc set; 1.33:1 aspect ratio; AUDIO; English 5.1 Dolby Digital; Spanish 2.0 Dolby Surround; French 2.0 Dolby Surround; SUBTITLES; English SDH; Spanish			Optional commentaries for all 25 episodes; Introduction from Matt Groening; Deleted Scenes; Who Shot Mr. Burns? (Part Two); Bart Sells His Soul; Lisa the Vegetarian; Treehouse of Horror VI; King-Size Homer; Mother Simpson; Team Homer; Two Bad Neighbors; Scenes from the Class Struggle in Springfield; Bart the Fink; Lisa the Iconoclast; Homer the Smithers; The Day the Violence Died; A Fish Called Selma; Bart on the Road; 22 Short Films About Springfield; Much Apu About Nothing; Summer of 4 Ft. 2; Special Language Feature; 22 Short Films of Springfield; Portuguese 2.0 Dolby Surround; German 2.0 Dolby Surround; Italian 2.0 Dolby Surround; Japanese 2.0 Dolby Surround; Special "3D Homer" featurette; Paul McCartney's Lentil Soup recipe; Animatic/StoryBoards; Home Sweet Homediddly-Dum-Doodily; Raging Abe Simpson and His Grumbling Grandson in "The Curse of the Flying Hellfish"; Illustrated Commentary; The Day the Violence Died; Summer of 4 Ft. 2; Sketch Gallery
Release Dates
Region 1	Region 2	Region 4	
December 13, 2005	January 30, 2006	March 29, 2006	
