= Homerpalooza =

- The Simpsons episode
- Episode no.: Season 7 Episode 24
- Directed by: Wesley M. Archer
- Written by: Brent Forrester
- Production code: 3F21
- Original air date: May 19, 1996

Guest appearances
- Peter Frampton as himself; Cypress Hill as themselves; The Smashing Pumpkins as themselves; Sonic Youth as themselves

Episode features
- Couch gag: The family enters in a black-light haze, lighting returns to normal when Homer turns on the lights.
- Commentary: Matt Groening; Bill Oakley; Josh Weinstein; Brent Forrester; Wes Archer; Ken Keeler

Episode chronology
← Previous "Much Apu About Nothing"	Next → "Summer of 4 Ft. 2"
- The Simpsons season 7

"Homerpalooza" is the twenty-fourth and penultimate episode of the seventh season of the American animated television series The Simpsons. It originally aired on the Fox network in the United States on May 19, 1996. In the episode, Homer is shocked to find classic rock is no longer considered cool. Hoping to look cool for his children, he joins the Hullabalooza music festival as a carnival freak. The episode's title is a play on the Lollapalooza music festival. It was the last Simpsons episode written by Brent Forrester and the last one directed by Wes Archer (both Forrester and Archer left to work on King of the Hill). Peter Frampton and musical groups Sonic Youth, Cypress Hill, and The Smashing Pumpkins guest star as themselves.

== Plot ==
After Otto destroys the school bus while daydreaming, Homer is forced to carpool several students to school. He is shocked to find all the kids hate the classic rock radio station he listens to. Homer realizes that music from his high school days is no longer considered cool after a young man at a record store derides it.

Hoping to impress them, Homer takes Bart and Lisa to the Hullabalooza music festival. Homer tries to act cool by wearing a Rastafarian hat, but an angry crowd of Generation Xers confronts him after mistaking him for an undercover police officer. After being tossed out by the crowd, Homer angrily kicks a cannon, which shoots one of Peter Frampton's inflatable pigs at his stomach. The festival head is impressed by Homer's ability to absorb cannon fire and hires him for the festival's freak show, called the pageant of the transmundane.

Homer tours with the festival and parties with rap and rock stars Sonic Youth, Cypress Hill and The Smashing Pumpkins while earning respect among young people, including Bart. As the tour approaches a stop in Springfield, Homer's stomach aches and he is sent to a veterinarian. The doctor informs Homer he will die if he takes another cannonball to his gut. Homer decides to perform his act one last time, but he dodges the cannonball at the last second. After a warm sendoff from the touring bands, Homer leaves the festival and loses his children's respect for no longer being cool, which he embraces.

== Production ==
The entire story of the episode was developed by David Cohen, although it was written by Brent Forrester, who felt that Cohen at least deserved a "story by" credit. To do research for this episode, Forrester went to one of the Lollapalooza concerts, which he thought would be a fun little perk, but ended up being a horrible experience. Several of the jokes in this episode are based on his experiences: cameras were being seized and thrown in the garbage, there were numerous advertisements, several "sour faced teens", a real freak show (Jim Rose Circus), and at one point a stranger approached Forrester and asked, "how's it going, narc?"

During Homer's confrontation with the Hullabalooza crowd, there is a brief shot of Homer with the members of the band No Doubt behind him. Eric Stefani, the founding member of No Doubt and the brother of its lead singer Gwen Stefani, was working as an animator on the show at the time and added them in.

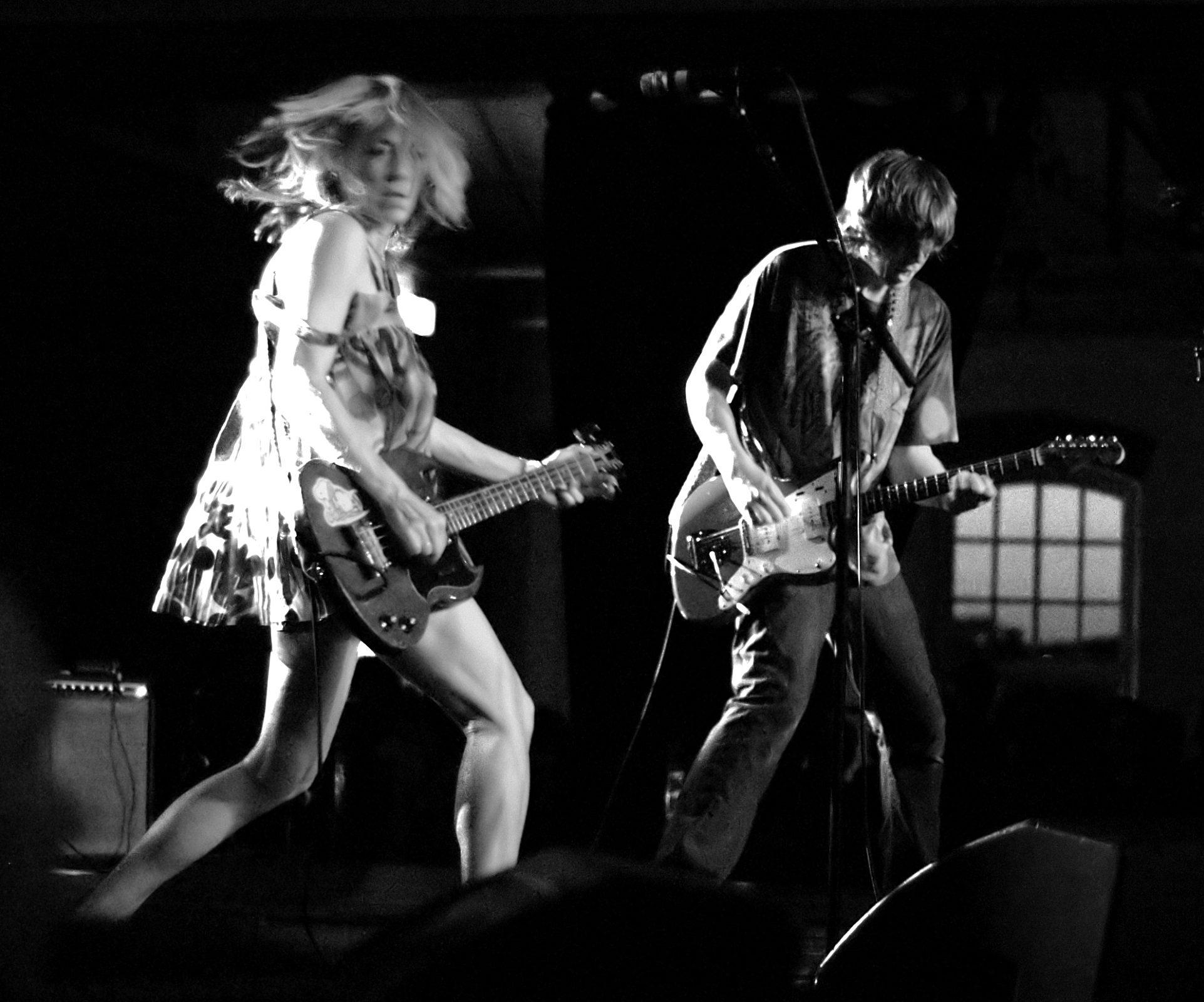
Sonic Youth threatened to not appear in the episode if Courtney Love was cast in it.

The writers were aiming to have artists that represented several genres: hip hop (Cypress Hill), alternative rock (Sonic Youth, Smashing Pumpkins), and a classic rock singer. Originally, Bob Dylan was sought for this role, but he was replaced by Peter Frampton. Billy Corgan impressed the production staff by doing strong impersonations of Homer and Marge, though it was decided to not have him use them in the episode. Pearl Jam was asked to appear in the episode but declined.

Originally, Courtney Love and Hole were wanted for this episode, but they declined. According to the DVD commentary, an unnamed group (later revealed by Entertainment Weekly to be Sonic Youth) said that they would refuse to appear in the episode if Courtney Love was involved. It was thought that Love would appear in the episode because she had recently done a film with James L. Brooks, but she never responded to the request.

== Impact ==
=== Cultural references ===
The flashback where Homer meets the guys in the van is based on the film Dazed and Confused. Several of the scenes where Homer is hit with a cannonball are based on famous stock footage of Frank "Cannonball" Richards being hit with a cannonball, as is the entire concept of a "cannonball catcher". Otto's drug-induced hallucination of his "talking shoes" is based on the opening of the album version of Prince's song "1999". Homer's walk in one scene parodies the walk in Robert Crumb's comic Keep on Truckin'.

=== Critical reception ===
In its original broadcast, "Homerpalooza" finished 57th in ratings for the week of May 13–19, 1996, with a Nielsen rating of 7.8, equivalent to approximately 7.5 million viewing households. It was the third highest-rated show on the Fox network that week, following The X-Files and Married... with Children.

In 1998, TV Guide listed it in its list of top twelve Simpsons episodes. The BBC website called the episode "One of the most memorable episodes, if not one of the greatest – the satire on youth counterculture is well handled, and Homer's flashback to his youth is fabulous." and IGN said the episode was one of the best of season seven. In 2019, Consequence of Sound ranked it the third greatest episode on its list of top 30 Simpsons episodes.

In a list of the 25 greatest guest voices on the show, released September 5, 2006, IGN ranked the Hullabalooza performers 23rd. The noise rock version of the end credits performed by Sonic Youth has been ranked among the best versions of the theme by Matt Groening and by Chris Turner in his book Planet Simpson. Bill Oakley has said that Peter Frampton is one of his favorite guest stars and he wished he could have done a TV show with him. Alternatively, the Rover Hendrix act break joke has been called one of the worst jokes in The Simpsons history by the writers and producers.

In 2007, Simon Crerar of The Times listed the Smashing Pumpkins' and Cypress Hill's performances among the 33 funniest cameos in the history of the show. In 2024, the group made the joke of performing with the London Symphony Orchestra a reality. Andrew Martin of Prefix Mag named Cypress Hill his sixth-favorite musical guests on The Simpsons out of a list of ten.
