= Scenes from the Class Struggle in Springfield =

- The Simpsons episode
- Episode no.: Season 7 Episode 14
- Directed by: Susie Dietter
- Written by: Jennifer Crittenden
- Production code: 3F11
- Original air date: February 4, 1996

Guest appearance
- Tom Kite as himself

Episode features
- Couch gag: The living room is bathed in black light. Homer turns the light on and everything is returned to normal.
- Commentary: Matt Groening; Bill Oakley; Josh Weinstein; Susie Dietter

Episode chronology
← Previous "Two Bad Neighbors"	Next → "Bart the Fink"
- The Simpsons season 7

"Scenes from the Class Struggle in Springfield" is the fourteenth episode of the seventh season of the American animated television series The Simpsons. It originally aired on Fox in the United States on February 4, 1996. In this episode, Marge buys a Chanel suit and, invited to join the Springfield Country Club, becomes obsessed with trying to fit in with Springfield's upper class.

The episode was written by Jennifer Crittenden and directed by Susie Dietter. It was the first time that a female writer and director were credited in the same episode. Tom Kite guest starred in the episode, and he enjoyed recording his parts for it. The episode's title is based on the 1989 film Scenes from the Class Struggle in Beverly Hills.

Since airing, the episode has received mostly positive reviews from television critics. It acquired a Nielsen rating of 8.8, and was the fifth-highest-rated show on the Fox network the week it aired.

== Plot ==
The Simpsons travel to the Ogdenville mall to buy a new television after Grampa breaks their old one. Marge and Lisa visit a discount store, where Marge finds a $2800 Chanel suit on sale for $90. Later Marge encounters an old classmate, Evelyn, at the Kwik-E-Mart. Evelyn is impressed by Marge's fashion sense and invites her to the Springfield Country Club.

Desperately trying to fit in with Evelyn's snobby friends at the club, Marge ignores their catty remarks after she wears the same Chanel suit on each visit. Lisa enjoys horseback riding at the club, but the rest of the family is uncomfortable there. After being trained by Tom Kite, Homer plays golf on the club's greens and learns Waylon Smithers is helping Mr. Burns cheat while caddying for him. In exchange for Homer's silence, Burns agrees to help Marge join the club.

Marge tries to alter her suit for the club membership ceremony, but Lisa annoys her constantly about horses, causing her to snap. After Lisa leaves the room, Marge finishes her dress but accidentally steps on her sewing machine's foot control pedal, destroying it. She's now forced her to buy a new Chanel evening gown. As the family walks toward the party, Marge criticizes everyone else's behavior. When Homer tells the children they should thank her for pointing out how bad they really are, Marge realizes she has changed for the worse. The family skips the party and goes to Krusty Burger instead, unaware that the club has accepted Marge's membership.

== Production ==
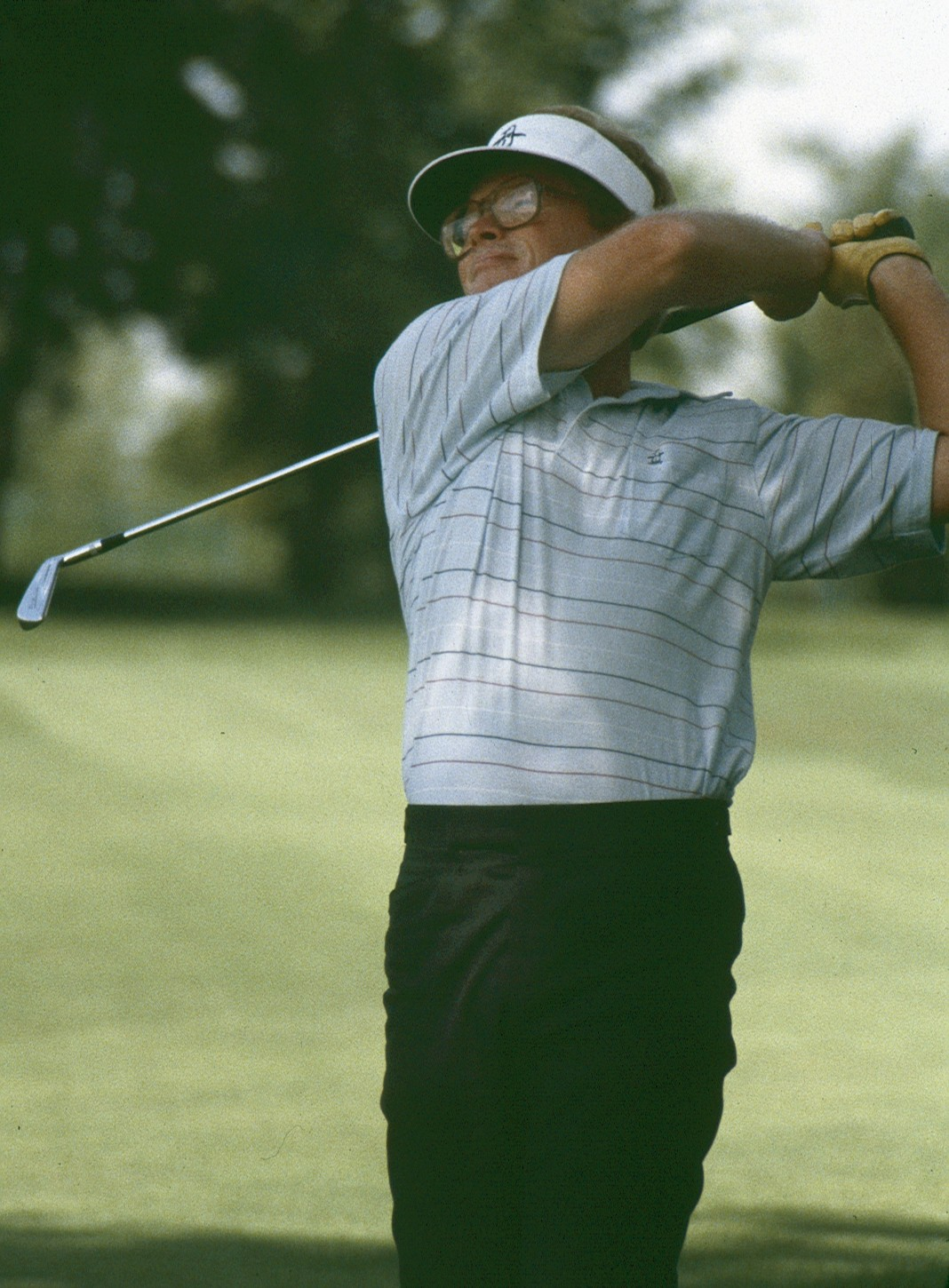
Tom Kite guest starred in the episode as himself.

The episode was written by Jennifer Crittenden and directed by Susie Dietter. It was the first time a female writer and director were credited in the same episode. The episode's title is a parody of the film Scenes from the Class Struggle in Beverly Hills. The first script of the episode was too long and it had to be cut down. Dietter remembered that it "took on a more serious tone" because they had to keep the parts that were essential to the story and cut the many "throwaway gags". Bill Oakley, the show runner of The Simpsons at the time, praised the episode for having a "terrific" story that "really comes together well". Oakley said that he and fellow show runner Josh Weinstein wanted to have more "emotionally" based episodes this season that still had humor in them. He thought Crittenden did a "good job" at that and he thought the episode "came out well".

Marge's suit was modeled on an actual Chanel suit, and also the type of dresses that former First Lady Jacqueline Kennedy Onassis used to wear. The show's creator, Matt Groening, was worried that such a detailed outfit would look "weird" on a Simpsons character because they are "simply designed" and their clothing is "very generic". He ended up liking the design, though, and Dietter thought it looked "good" on Marge. Oakley also liked the design and thought the cut on Marge was "flattering". The country club women's clothes were changed in every scene, something Dietter thought was hard to do because the animators had to come up with new designs.

Tom Kite guest starred in the episode as himself. He said that he "really enjoyed" recording his parts for it. "It was a lot of fun trying to imagine exactly what Homer's golf swing is going to look like. My number one fear is that Homer will end up having a better golf swing than I do—heaven forbid!", he added.

== Cultural references ==
At the electronic appliance store, "Panaphonic", "Magnetbox" and "Sorny" are parodies of Panasonic, Magnavox and Sony respectively. The opera playing on TV while Marge is vacuuming is Giuseppe Verdi's La Traviata. Marge asks Homer not to wear a short-sleeve shirt and a tie; he protests "Sipowicz does it", referring to Dennis Franz's character on NYPD Blue. The character of Susan is based on Dorothy Parker. Lisa says "The rich are different from you and me", a paraphrase of the line "Let me tell you about the very rich. They are different from you and me" from F. Scott Fitzgerald's short story "The Rich Boy." Marge tells the family "I wouldn't join any club that would have this me as a member", paraphrasing a line by Groucho Marx. The episode may well have been directly inspired by The Velvet Underground's 1966 song All Tomorrow's Parties.

== Reception ==
In its original broadcast, "Scenes from the Class Struggle in Springfield" finished 64th in the ratings for the week of January 29 to February 4, 1996, with a Nielsen rating of 8.8. The episode was the fifth-highest-rated show on the Fox network that week.

Since airing, the episode has received mostly positive reviews from television critics. Gary Russell and Gareth Roberts, authors of the book I Can't Believe It's a Bigger and Better Updated Unofficial Simpsons Guide, summed it up as follows: "Marge looks great in her Chanel, the golf scenes between Homer and Mr. Burns are brilliant, and there are many true, touching moments as Marge struggles valiantly to improve herself. Yet again, it's tempting for the viewer to urge Marge on and get the hell away from the family."

DVD Movie Guide's Colin Jacobson said that he does not know if he "accepts" the episode as being "in character" for Marge. He said that it borrows liberally from The Flintstones, but he "likes it anyway". Jacobson added that the episode "jabs the idle rich nicely", and he enjoyed the golf scenes with Homer.

Jennifer Malkowski of DVD Verdict considered the best part of the episode to be Mr. Burns's demand for his tires to be revulcanized at the gas station. She concluded her review by giving the episode a grade of B.

The authors of the book Homer Simpson Goes to Washington, Joseph Foy and Stanley Schultz, wrote that in the episode, "the tension of trying to demonstrate a family's achievement of the American Dream is satirically and expertly played out by Marge Simpson".

Erik Adams writes "Convention would dictate that any Simpsons episode involving a country club would turn out to be a 'snobs versus slobs' affair; 'Scenes From The Class Struggle In Springfield' turns out to be something more deeply felt. When Marge’s sewing machine eats her suit, she sits down with a resigned 'At times like this, I guess all you can do is laugh'—but the laugh doesn’t come. That sequence is indicative of the episode as a whole: Touching in its small-scale tragedy, more droll than it is laugh-out-loud funny. It’s a story about 'in your face humanity' in its many forms, including the need to be accepted at any cost and the desire to trick your employer and one true love into thinking he’s the world’s greatest golfer. 'Scenes From The Class Struggle In Springfield' doesn’t have the most outrageous visual gags or the funniest lines, but it is the type of Simpsons episode that can be revisited and revisited, unveiling new layers of itself each time—just like a good short story does."
