= Much Apu About Nothing =

- The Simpsons episode
- Episode no.: Season 7 Episode 23
- Directed by: Susie Dietter
- Written by: David X. Cohen
- Production code: 3F20
- Original air date: May 5, 1996

Guest appearance
- Joe Mantegna as Fat Tony

Episode features
- Couch gag: Marge, Bart, Lisa, and Maggie are mounted moose heads on the wall and Homer is a bearskin rug on the floor. A game hunter sits on the couch and smokes a pipe.
- Commentary: Matt Groening; Bill Oakley; Josh Weinstein; David X. Cohen; Susie Dietter

Episode chronology
| ← Previous "Raging Abe Simpson and His Grumbling Grandson in 'The Curse of the Flying Hellfish'" | Next → "Homerpalooza" |
- The Simpsons season 7

"Much Apu About Nothing" is the twenty-third episode of the seventh season of the American animated television series The Simpsons. It originally aired on the Fox network in the United States on May 5, 1996. In the episode, a referendum is placed on the ballot that will require all illegal immigrants in Springfield to be deported. After learning that Apu will be deported if the measure passes, Homer helps him prepare for a United States citizenship test so that he can become a legal citizen.

The episode was written by David X. Cohen, and directed by Susie Dietter. Joe Mantegna guest stars in the episode as Fat Tony. The title of the episode is a parody of William Shakespeare's play Much Ado About Nothing.

Since airing, the episode has received mostly positive reviews from television critics. It acquired a Nielsen rating of 8.2, and was the fourth highest-rated show on the Fox network the week it aired.

== Plot ==
A brown bear roams the streets of Springfield, frightening the townspeople despite its docile and curious, rather than aggressive, behavior. After Homer leaves home to purchase beer (ignoring official advice to remain indoors), he comes face-to-face with the bear after failing to get into his car by climbing across the power line, whereupon the police tranquilize the animal, as well as accidentally tranquilizing Barney Gumble. Despite this being an unprecedented sight in Springfield, Homer leads a march of angry citizens to city hall, where they demand Mayor Quimby do something to protect them from bears. After Quimby deploys a bear patrol, which involves the use of high tech vehicles, including B2 Spirit aircraft, Homer is angry to learn his taxes have increased by $5 to maintain it. Another crowd of angry citizens marches to the mayor's office demanding lower taxes. To appease them, Quimby blames the higher taxes on illegal immigrants. He creates Proposition 24, which will force all illegal immigrants in Springfield to be deported.

Springfield residents start to harass local immigrants, regardless of status. At the Kwik-E-Mart, Apu confides in Homer that he is also an illegal immigrant. Apu fears that if Proposition 24 passes, he will be forced to leave the United States, since his visa originally issued for his computer science studies expired many years before. After enquiring about Kearney's fake ID, Apu visits Fat Tony to obtain false citizenship. At Tony's urging, Apu pretends to be an American citizen, even speaking in a faux American accent, but soon feels guilty about committing fraud and abandoning his Indian heritage, and destroys his fake passport.

After seeing how distraught Apu is at the prospect of being deported, Homer vows that he and his family will help him. Lisa discovers that Apu, as a long-term resident in the U.S., will not have to leave if he passes a citizenship test. Homer agrees to tutor Apu, but is unable to teach him accurate facts regarding U.S. history or political science needed to pass the exam. After falling asleep and forgetting everything Homer taught him, Apu passes the test and becomes a US citizen. At a congratulatory party, Homer tells his guests deporting immigrants is awful because they help the country thrive. He inspires them to vote no on Proposition 24, but it still passes with 95% of the vote. When Proposition 24 is enacted, Groundskeeper Willie is the only resident deported.

== Production ==
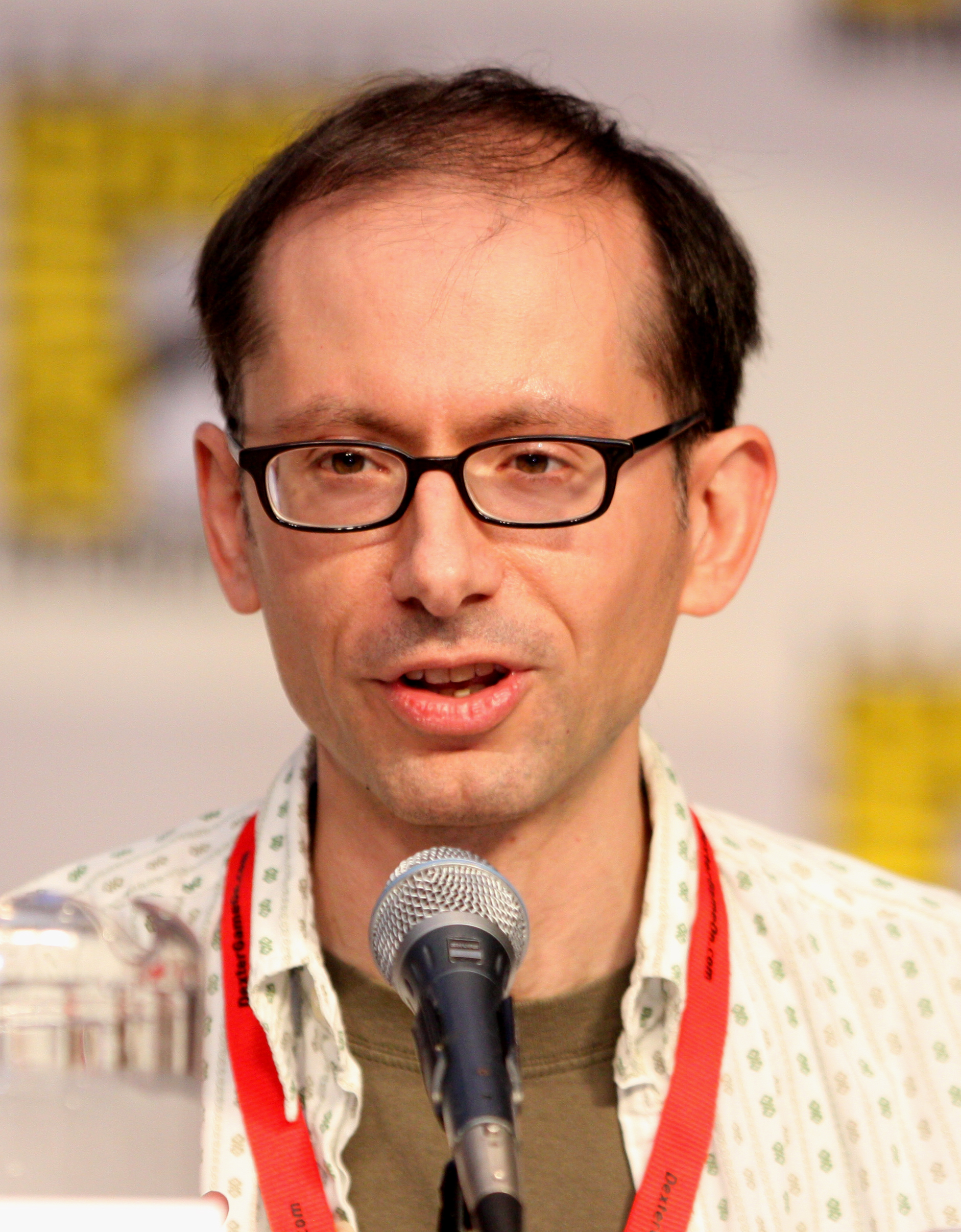
David X. Cohen wrote the episode. The final version did not differ greatly from his first draft.

"Much Apu About Nothing" was written by David X. Cohen and directed by Susie Dietter. Joe Mantegna guest stars in the episode as Fat Tony. Much of the inspiration for the episode came from news reports of bears roaming streets in Southern California around the time when the episode was in production. Cohen said that when a bear swims in somebody's pool or goes in somebody's garbage can, it becomes a popular news item in California. The show runner of The Simpsons at the time, Bill Oakley, commented that the news reports often create an anti-bear hysteria, and that is one of the inspirations for the episode. Another inspiration for the episode came from California's Proposition 187, which proposed the rescinding of employment rights and benefits from illegal immigrants. Cohen decided to name the referendum "Proposition 24" because 24 was the number he had on his Little League Baseball uniform. Cohen commented that the bear and illegal immigration themes were "yanked from the California headlines."

Apu studying computer science is based on Cohen's own academic background, where he met and became friends with Indian people in the department. Similarly, the scene where Apu does an in-depth explanation of what caused the American Civil War, only for the test taker to respond with "just say slavery", is something that actually happened to a friend of Cohen when she took her citizenship test. Apu attends the Springfield Heights Institute of Technology, with the acronym SHIT; Matt Groening and Cohen were happy that the joke was not censored.

Cohen said that the episode changed very little from the first draft to the final aired edition. Oakley commented that while some writers' scripts get rewritten many times, Cohen's scripts are not often re-written because they are of high quality. Oakley added that Cohen has a very distinctive comedy style and some jokes in the episode "just really sound like Cohen".

Something Oakley and his partner Josh Weinstein wanted to do while they were show runners of The Simpsons was to explore side-characters, such as Apu, "a little deeper". Apu's origin is revealed in this episode, and Oakley is proud of being the one who suggested that. Another character that was explored deeper in their period as show runners was Ned Flanders in the episode "Hurricane Neddy".

== Cultural references ==
The episode's title is based on William Shakespeare's play Much Ado About Nothing. The original title for the episode was going to be "The Anti-Immigrant Song", in reference to Led Zeppelin's "Immigrant Song". A sign held by a protester outside the Kwik-E-Mart says "The only good foreigner is Rod Stewart!", a reference to the British singer. Brad Bird, an American director who has worked as executive consultant and director on The Simpsons, can briefly be seen in the crowd that complains to Mayor Quimby. Chief Wiggum references Emma Lazarus's poem "The New Colossus": "First we'll be rounding up your tired, then your poor, then your huddled masses yearning to breathe free…"

== Reception ==
In its original broadcast, "Much Apu About Nothing" finished 49th in the ratings for the week of April 29 to May 5, 1996, with a Nielsen rating of 8.2. The episode was the fourth-highest-rated show on the Fox network that week, following The X-Files, Beverly Hills, 90210, and Melrose Place.

Since airing, the episode has received mostly positive reviews from television critics. DVD Movie Guide's Colin Jacobson commented positively on the episode, and said that "if any show's taken a more unusual path to a story about xenophobia, I've not seen it." He praised the bear scenes, which he thought was the episode's most "amusing" part. The review continued, "The parts with the immigrants are also good, especially since they make their point deftly. Add to that the hilarious sound of 'American Apu' and this is a strong program." Jennifer Malkowski gave the episode a grade of B+. The episode received a negative review from Dave Foster of DVD Times. He considered "Much Apu About Nothing" to be one of the season's most "tiring" episodes, and that Apu is not a strong enough character to carry an episode. Foster commented that the episode deals with a political issue which is too complex to cover in twenty minutes, leading to a rushed ending.

James Gill of Spiked and Les Chappell of The A.V. Club praised the scene in which Apu, an undocumented migrant, is shown to have a vastly superior knowledge of American history than Homer, who was born in the country. Gill said that this scene is evidence against Hari Kondabolu's assertion that Simpsons writers do not use Apu to mock ignorance by white Americans; Sam Thielman of The Guardian called the episode the best argument against accusations that Apu is a racist stereotype.

The authors of the book I Can't Believe It's a Bigger and Better Updated Unofficial Simpsons Guide, Gary Russell and Gareth Roberts, wrote: "One of the most outspoken, and certainly angriest of episodes succeeds as a savage satire on the scapegoating of immigrants. Homer has never been so frighteningly dumb, although he does come through with a rousing liberal speech." In 2000, The Simpsons creator Matt Groening named this his third favorite episode of the show. Thielman listed the episode at number 3 in a 2016 list of the best episodes. The episode has become study material for sociology courses at University of California Berkeley, where it is used to "examine issues of the production and reception of cultural objects, in this case, a satirical cartoon show".

Chappell praises the portrayal of Springfield: "There's hypocrisy from the worst of them (Moe's protest-too-much attitude hiding his own citizenship woes) and the best of them (Apu's tearful joy at and subsequent discarding of a jury duty notice). It's an episode that knows there's no easy answers to big questions, and it focuses on the large and small of those people caught up in those questions—a move that cements it as yet another Simpsons season seven triumph."

== Legacy ==
In the episode, after the creation of the Bear Patrol, bear sightings decrease to zero, so Homer concludes that the Bear Patrol must be working. Lisa attempts to demonstrate Homer's logical fallacy by the example of a tiger-repellent rock, but it goes over his head. Scott Anthony of the Harvard Business Review describes this scene as a "classic example" of the informal fallacy of assuming that correlation implies causation. Mike Moffatt also called it "the best all-time discussion of faulty reasoning".
