= Raging Abe Simpson and His Grumbling Grandson in 'The Curse of the Flying Hellfish' =

- The Simpsons episode
- Episode no.: Season 7 Episode 22
- Directed by: Jeff Lynch
- Written by: Jonathan Collier
- Production code: 3F19
- Original air date: April 28, 1996

Episode features
- Couch gag: The family sits on the couch. Homer notices a plug in the middle of the floor and pulls it. Everyone and everything gets sucked down the drain.
- Commentary: Bill Oakley; Josh Weinstein; Jonathan Collier; David Silverman

Episode chronology
← Previous "22 Short Films About Springfield"	Next → "Much Apu About Nothing"
- The Simpsons season 7

"Raging Abe Simpson and His Grumbling Grandson in 'The Curse of the Flying Hellfish'", or simply "The Curse of the Flying Hellfish", is the twenty-second episode of the seventh season of the American animated television series The Simpsons. It originally aired on the Fox network in the United States on April 28, 1996.

In the episode, one of Abraham Simpson's fellow World War II veterans, Asa Phelps, dies, leaving him and Mr. Burns as the only living members of Grampa's war squad, the Flying Hellfish. In the final days of the war, the unit had discovered several paintings and agreed on a tontine, placing the paintings in a crate, and the final surviving member would inherit the paintings. As Mr. Burns wants the paintings as soon as possible, he orders Abe's assassination. To escape death, Abe moves into the Simpsons' house, where the family lets him live in Bart's room. Bart eventually joins Grampa in a daring mission to recover the paintings.

Written by Jonathan Collier and directed by Jeffrey Lynch, the episode was inspired by several stories about lost art surfacing. The staging of several scenes was based on DC Comics's Sgt. Rock and Marvel Comics's Sgt. Fury and his Howling Commandos. The episode scored a Nielsen rating of 8.3, making it the second-highest-rated show on the Fox network the week it aired, and received positive reviews from critics, who particularly praised the animation of its action and underwater scenes.

== Plot ==
During Grandparents' Day at Springfield Elementary School, Grampa embarrasses Bart with his tall tales, straining their relationship. At the retirement home, Grampa receives word that Asa Phelps, one of the men who served under his command in the Army during World War II, has died. Grampa and Mr. Burns are now the only two surviving members of their infantry squad, known as the Flying Hellfish. Unwilling to wait for Grampa's natural death, Burns hires an assassin named Fernando Vidal to kill him. After avoiding several attempts on his life, Grampa seeks refuge at the Simpsons' house. He bunks in Bart's room and explains why Burns wants him dead.

In a flashback, he reveals that the Flying Hellfish discovered several priceless paintings in a German castle during the final days of World War II. To avoid being caught stealing the paintings, the soldiers formed a tontine and locked them in a strongbox, which was hidden away; the last surviving member of their group would inherit the collection. Each man was given a key, all of which are needed to trigger a mechanism that reveals where the paintings are hidden.

After Grampa ends his story, Burns breaches Bart's bedroom wall with a cherry-picker and takes Grampa's key by force. After Bart retrieves Burns's and Grampa's keys using a sleight of hand, he and Grampa rush to the Hellfish monument in a local cemetery. After activating the locator mechanism in the monument, they learn that the paintings are hidden at the bottom of a lake. They borrow Ned Flanders' motorboat and head to the location.

Bart retrieves the strongbox during a dive. As he and Grampa open it, Burns arrives and takes the paintings at gunpoint. When Bart calls him a coward and an embarrassment to the Hellfish, Burns kicks him into the empty strongbox, which locks and topples back into the lake. After Grampa dives in and rescues Bart, they chase Burns back to shore, where Grampa overpowers him. Rather than killing Burns, Grampa instead gives him a dishonorable discharge for trying to kill his commanding officer and his grandson and expels him from the tontine.

Before Grampa and Bart can leave with the paintings, several State Department agents arrive. They reveal the U.S. government has tried to find the paintings for 50 years to avoid an international incident with Germany. The agents confiscate the paintings and hand them to a Eurotrash heir of one of the original owners, leaving Bart and Grampa empty-handed. Despite the loss, Grampa is content, knowing he has proven to Bart that he is not just a pathetic old man. Having reconciled, they hug. The heir then tells them to "get a room", embarrassing Bart.

== Production ==
The episode was praised for its animation, especially in the underwater scenes. The distorted underwater effect was added in post-production.

Jonathan Collier, who wrote the episode, got the idea after reading several then-current stories about lost art surfacing. The story then evolved into one involving Grampa and Burns, and it gave the writers a chance to introduce the relatives of some of the recurring characters. The other members of the Flying Hellfish were based on stereotypical war movie characters. The idea of having a tontine came from Bill Oakley, who got the idea from "an old Barney Miller episode". Collier originally named the unit the "Fighting Hellfish" but it was later changed to the "Flying Hellfish". The logo for the unit was designed using the original name and was not subsequently changed when the name was switched.

Supervising director David Silverman describes the directing in the episode as an "amazingly brilliant job". Director Jeffrey Lynch received help from Brad Bird, with whom he worked on many complex staging shots. Lynch did not have any other episodes to work on at the time and was able to devote a lot of time to working on the episode. He storyboarded most of it by himself. The episode contains more effects shots than an average episode of The Simpsons, many of which were worked on by animator Dexter Reed. Other animators that worked on the episode include Chris Clements, Ely Lester, James Purdum, Tommy Tejeda, and Orlando Baeza.

== Cultural references ==
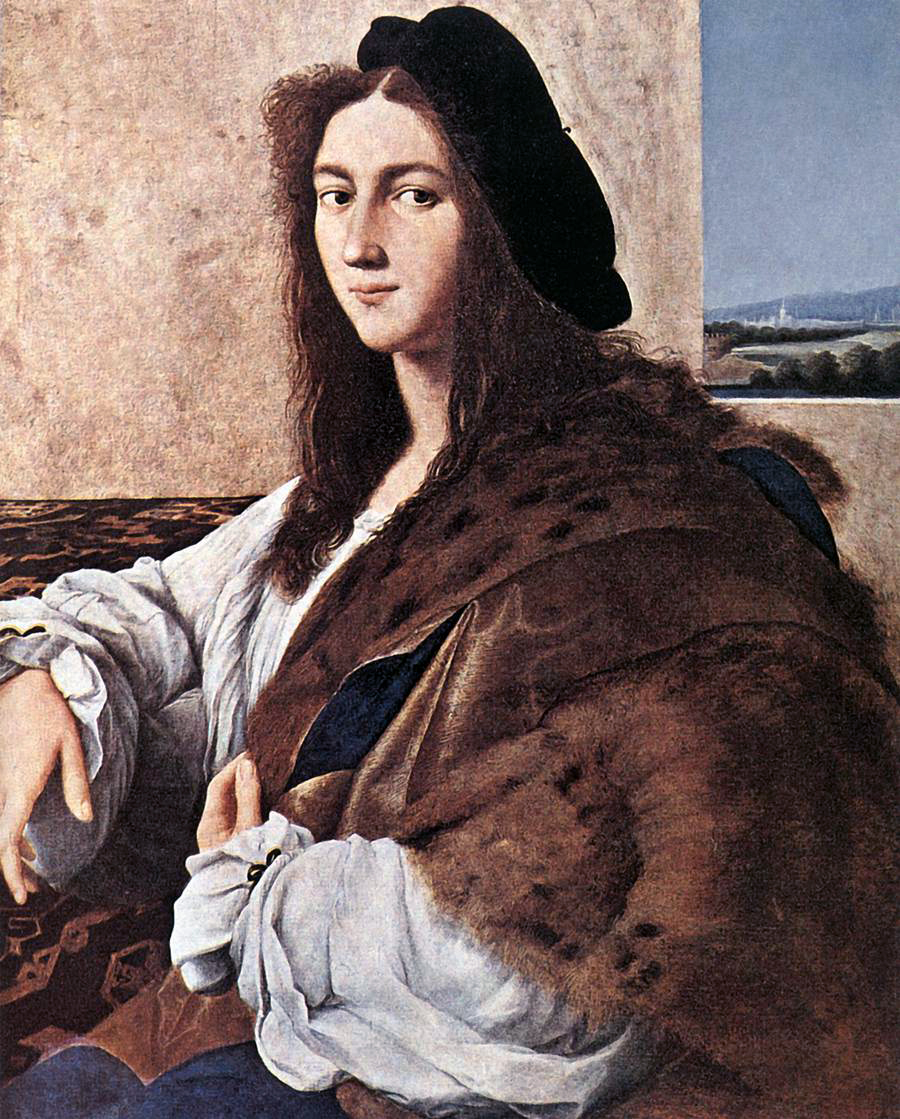
Portrait of a Young Man (c. 1513–1514) by Raphael, one of the lost works of art depicted in the episode

Much of the staging in the flashback scenes is based on DC Comics's Sgt. Rock and Marvel Comics's Sgt. Fury and his Howling Commandos. Many of the paintings in the episode are based on real paintings that went missing during World War II. The animators referenced a book of lost art for the designs. Other cultural references in the episode include Grampa's recollection of his brush with death at the Retirement Castle, which is a reference to Dorothy's return to Kansas in The Wizard of Oz. Mr. Burns introduces himself to the assassin as "M.B." and is briefly mistaken for former Washington D.C. Mayor Marion Barry with the assassin asking "Is it time for another shipment already?", a reference to the mayor's 1990 drug arrest. The sequence where Ox explains the concept of a tontine is similar to a scene in the M*A*S*H episode "Old Soldiers". The Flying Hellfish raid on the castle recalls the attack on the château in The Dirty Dozen. The scene where Grampa tries to assassinate Hitler is based on The Day of the Jackal. During that scene, Abe says "they'll never save your brain, Hitler", a reference to a 1963 movie called They Saved Hitler's Brain. The song played by Baron von Wortzenberger as he drives off is Caterpillar (Rabbit in the Moon mix) by DJ Keoki.

== Reception ==
In its original broadcast, "The Curse of the Flying Hellfish" finished 48th in the ratings for the week of April 22 to April 28, 1996, with a Nielsen rating of 8.3. The episode was the second-highest-rated show on the Fox network that week, following The X-Files.

The authors of the book I Can't Believe It's a Bigger and Better Updated Unofficial Simpsons Guide, Gary Russell and Gareth Roberts, wrote that the episode is "notable for Mr Burns' impersonation of Marge, some spectacular action sequences, and some good underwater scenes—but [it is] not especially brilliant". Dave Foster of DVD Times said: "It's easily the highlight of this season in terms of cinematic presence, with wonderful animation, staging and lighting which complements what is essentially a mini action adventure movie superbly realised via Grandpa and Bart. Like numerous episodes this season it also works as another example of family ties being reinforced though never at the sake of entertainment." DVD Movie Guide's Colin Jacobson wrote that "many Grampa episodes tank, but 'Hellfish' provides a very notable exception. It's a lot of fun to see his wartime past, especially since we find precursors of series regulars. I also like the action swing the story takes, as it becomes clever and inventive. This comes out as a terrific show."

Adam Finley of TV Squad listed "Raging Abe" as one of the most touching episodes of The Simpsons, noting that it is "more 'crazy action flick' than emotional, but I list it here because it shows Grandpa Simpson as someone other than a crazy old coot." Florencia Aberastury, Christopher Raley, and Robert Vaux of Comic Book Resources ranked it No. 25 on their list of the 25 Funniest Episodes of The Simpsons, Ranked. They highlighted the relationship between Bart and Abe, stating that it "clearly demonstrates that Grampa Simpson can be a hilarious main character given the right plot." Robert Canning of IGN gave it an 8.9 ("Great"), saying that "Raging Abe Simpson and His Grumbling Grandson in 'The Curse of the Flying Hellfish' is a hilarious romp. The action and twists may overshadow the jokes, but the episode is still very entertaining." Erik Adams called the episode "a visual feast assembled from scraps of pulpy adventure serials and vintage military comics. Director Jeffrey Lynch goes for flash early and often in this episode, lowering the vantage point of the camera and playing up the leading lines, taking great care in conveying the action in Jonathan Collier's script. It's a genre exercise, but one that never strays far from the truth of its main character. Abe stories frequently hinge on the character's anxieties about obsolescence and death, and he's given a tangible reason to assert his liveliness here. ... And to bring it back to the small stuff that was The Simpsons' signature, there's still this tale of Grampa redeeming himself in the eyes of his grandson."
