= Two Bad Neighbors =

- The Simpsons episode
- Episode no.: Season 7 Episode 13
- Directed by: Wes Archer
- Written by: Ken Keeler
- Production code: 3F09
- Original air date: January 14, 1996

Episode features
- Couch gag: Marge, Bart, Lisa, and Maggie are moose heads on the wall and Homer is a bearskin rug on the floor. A game hunter comes in, sits on the couch, and smokes a pipe.
- Commentary: Matt Groening; Bill Oakley; Josh Weinstein; Ken Keeler; Wes Archer

Episode chronology
← Previous "Team Homer"	Next → "Scenes from the Class Struggle in Springfield"
- The Simpsons season 7

"Two Bad Neighbors" is the thirteenth episode of the seventh season of the American animated television series The Simpsons. It was written by Ken Keeler, directed by Wes Archer and inspired by the animosity toward the series' earlier run from the Bush family. In the episode, George H. W. Bush, a former President of the United States (voiced by Harry Shearer), moves across the street from the Simpsons. Homer seeks revenge after the former President spanks Bart for his bad behavior.

"Two Bad Neighbors" originally aired on Fox in the United States on January 14, 1996. The episode was selected for release in a 2000 video collection of selected political episodes of the show, titled: The Simpsons Political Party. The episode appeared on the second volume of the collection, together with "Duffless" from season four. The episode was included in The Simpsons season seven DVD set, which was released on December 13, 2005. Keeler, Oakley, and Weinstein participated in the DVD's audio commentary, alongside Matt Groening and the director of the episode, Wes Archer. This episode also marks the first appearance of regular recurring character Disco Stu.

== Plot ==
George H. W. Bush and his wife Barbara are looking for a place where they can get away from politics. They settle on Springfield, the city with the lowest voter turnout in America, and move into the house opposite the Simpsons. Although Ned Flanders and his family came over to visit the Bushes with George taking a liking to Ned, Bart's pranks and irreverent spirit quickly get on George's nerves, despite Barbara getting along quite well with him, and he reaches his breaking point after Bart accidentally shreds his memoirs with an outboard motor. George gives Bart a spanking, which evokes Homer's ire, and the two become enemies from then on.

Homer and Bart launch bottle rockets at George's window and George puts up a banner reading "Two Bad Neighbors". Next, Homer and Bart use cardboard likenesses of George's sons, George W. and Jeb, to lure him out of the house, where they glue a clown wig to his head. Following his speech at The Springfield B.P.O.E., George retaliates by destroying the Simpsons' lawn with his car.

Homer and Bart decide to release locusts in the Bushes' house, but George catches them in the act. Homer and George begin brawling and only stop when Mikhail Gorbachev arrives to deliver a housewarming present. Under pressure from his wife, George apologizes to Homer in front of Gorbachev. After George apologizes, Homer also wants him to apologize for the tax hike. Refusing to do so, the Bushes move again and their house is bought by President Gerald Ford. Homer and Ford bond over their love of football, beer, and nachos, and discover that they are equally accident-prone.

== Production ==
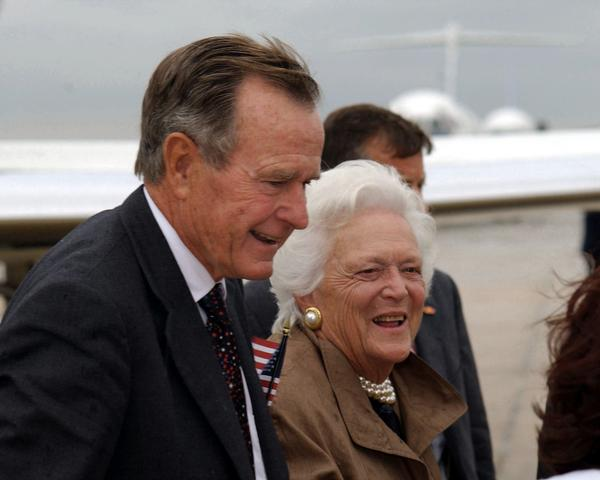
George H. W. Bush and his wife had a feud with The Simpsons that eventually led to this episode.

The show had a feud with the Bushes that eventually led to the idea for this episode. In the October 1, 1990 edition of People, Barbara Bush called The Simpsons "the dumbest thing [she] had ever seen", which had led to the writers sending a letter to Bush where they posed as Marge Simpson. Bush immediately sent a reply in which she apologized.

On January 27, 1992, then-President George H. W. Bush made a speech during his re-election campaign that reignited the feud between The Simpsons and the Bushes. At that point, family values were the cornerstone of Bush's campaign platform, to which effect he gave the following speech at the National Religious Broadcasters' convention in Washington, D.C.: "We are going to keep on trying to strengthen the American family, to make American families a lot more like the Waltons and a lot less like the Simpsons". The next broadcast of The Simpsons was a rerun of "Stark Raving Dad" on January 30, 1992. It included a new opening, which was a response to Bush's speech. The scene begins in the Simpsons' living room. Homer, Bart, Lisa, and Patty and Selma all stare at the television and watch Bush's speech. Following Bush's statement Bart replies, "Hey, we're just like the Waltons. We're praying for an end to the Depression too."

This episode marks the only Season 7 episode where Lisa has a minor role, having only one line, although she has major/supporting roles in the season's other episodes.

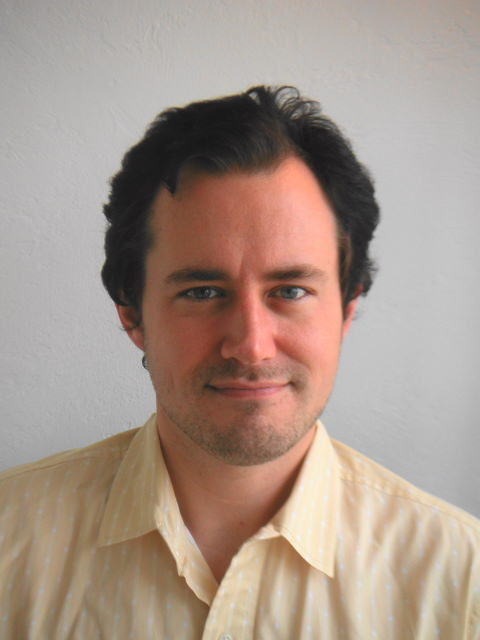
Bill Oakley got the inspiration for the episode following the feud with the Bushes.

Bill Oakley, who was a writer on The Simpsons at the time, came up with the idea for "Two Bad Neighbors" two years before production began. Oakley got the inspiration for the episode following the feud between the Bushes and the Simpson family, and two years later when he and Josh Weinstein became showrunners of The Simpsons, they assigned Ken Keeler to write it. Oakley said that Bill Clinton had been President of the United States for two years at the point when the episode went into production, so the feud had "faded off into oblivion". The staff therefore thought it would be funny if the two parties encountered each other again.

Weinstein said that the episode is often misunderstood. Many audiences expected a political satire, while the writers made special effort to keep the parody apolitical. Oakley stresses that "it's not a political attack, it's a personal attack", and instead of criticizing Bush for his policies, the episode instead pokes fun at his "crotchetiness". Oakley considered the episode to lack many "zany" jokes common for the show at that time, and described the episode as a companion piece to the season eight episode "Homer's Enemy", in that a realistic character (Frank Grimes in that case) is placed in the unrealistic Simpsons universe and juxtaposed alongside Homer, creating conflict.

In an interview with the fan site NoHomers.net, Weinstein was asked if there had been any stories that he had come up with that did not make it into the show, to which he replied: "The great thing about The Simpsons is that we pretty much were able to get away with everything, so there weren't any episodes we really wanted to do that we couldn't do. Even the crazy high-concept ones like 'Two Bad Neighbors' and 'Homer's Enemy' we managed to put on the air because honestly there were no network execs there to stop us."

At the end of the episode, Gerald Ford moves into the house across the street after Bush leaves. When originally conceived, Richard Nixon was going to move in instead, though this was changed to Bob Dole following Nixon's death. The writers then decided it would be funnier if it were Ford since they believed he was the politician who best represented Homer. Keeler's first draft also included a musical number in the style of Tom Lehrer's satirical recordings, although this ended up being cut.

The episode features the first appearance of Disco Stu, who became a recurring character in the series. Stu was originally designed as a withered, old, John Travolta-esque figure and was to be voiced by repeat guest star Phil Hartman. However, when the animators remodeled the character, Hartman was not available to dub the voice and so Hank Azaria took over the role. Homer has a jacket that says "Disco Stu" in rhinestones (he meant to write "Disco Stud" but ran out of room). Someone tells Stu he should buy it; he replies "Disco Stu doesn't advertise."

== Cultural references ==
Grampa Simpson claims to have been spanked by Grover Cleveland.

=== Politics ===
==== George H. W. Bush ====
There are numerous references to events in George H. W. Bush's presidency, such as the vomiting incident at a Japanese banquet, the invasion of Panama to depose Manuel Noriega and the broken pledge not to raise taxes. When Bush's memoirs are destroyed, a shred of paper briefly falls in front of the camera with the words "V.P. Quayle" and "embarrassment" legible.

==== Grover Cleveland ====
In response to George spanking Bart, Grandpa says: "Big deal! When I was a pup, we got spanked by presidents till the cows came home. Grover Cleveland spanked me on two non-consecutive occasions", referring to the first president to have served two non-consecutive terms in office.

=== TV ===
The relationship between Bart and George is a homage to the United States television series Dennis the Menace from 1959, with the Bushes standing in for Dennis's elderly neighbors, the Wilsons.

=== Music ===
When Homer and Bart hand out fliers for the upcoming garage sale, Apu Nahasapeemapetilon is seen washing his car while singing Cheap Trick's 1979 song "Dream Police".

Homer's song at the rummage sale is set to the tune of the songs "Big Spender" and "Stayin' Alive".

=== The Simpsons ===
Many of the items at the rummage sale are references to past episodes of the show. The Olmec head Xtapolapocetl, which Mr. Burns gave to the family, can be seen, as can several "I didn't do it!" T-shirts and Lisa's Lisa Lionheart doll. In the attic, Marge's painting of Ringo Starr can be seen.

== Reception ==
In its original broadcast, "Two Bad Neighbors" finished 52nd in the ratings for the week of January 7 to January 14, 1996, with a Nielsen rating of 9.9. The episode was the second-highest-rated show on the Fox network that week, following the NFC Championship postgame.

Since airing, the episode has received mostly positive reviews from fans and television critics. It was named by Vanity Fair's John Ortved as the show's fifth-best episode. Ortved said, "While the Simpsons people have always claimed evenhandedness in their satire, the show is, after all, hardly right-leaning, and it is hard to miss how gleefully the former President is mocked here." Gary Russell and Gareth Roberts, the authors of the book I Can't Believe It's a Bigger and Better Updated Unofficial Simpsons Guide, wrote: "Very strange, this episode takes The Simpsons into a whole new dimension of political satire. The lampooning of a single public figure is a startling move. Works much better for Americans, we're told."

Dave Foster of DVD Times said: "Once again showing the mischievous relationship Bart and Homer share their pranks and the inevitable confrontations with George Bush Senior are as hilarious as they are implausible and frequent, but there is much to love about this episode in which the writers think out loud and paint The Simpsons and its characters as Bush once did." DVD Movie Guide's Colin Jacobson enjoyed the episode and said that it "offers the kind of episode that only The Simpsons could pull off well. The idea of bringing a president to live in Springfield is high-concept to say the least, and it could—and probably should—have bombed. However, the silliness works well and turns this into a great show." John Thorpe of Central Michigan Life named it the second-best episode of the series, and Rich Weir of AskMen named it the ninth-best episode.

Rowan Kaiser writes “The formal experimentation of The Simpsons means that the show’s danger was never really in what it said—it was almost always good-hearted and praised kindness—but in how it said it. Toying with viewers’ expectations of how stories should work has a lot more staying power than easily-ignorable (or cancellable) stories that directly attack conventions.

Rowan Kaiser writes: "I went into this episode expecting to write something about how the lack of danger in 'Two Bad Neighbors' prefaced the show’s decline, an always-fruitful topic of discussion. For some reason I’d come to think that this was a relatively disliked episode of the Golden Years, although Wikipedia’s 'Reception' page suggests that it’s actually quite popular, and deservedly so—this is a damn funny episode. 'Two Bad Neighbors' is effortlessly playful, making joke after joke at multiple levels. At this stage of The Simpsons’ run, pretty much any content, even an antagonistic Republican president, could be plugged into the production system and turn out formally experimental and damn funny.”
