= Marge Be Not Proud =

- The Simpsons episode
- Episode no.: Season 7 Episode 11
- Directed by: Steven Dean Moore
- Written by: Mike Scully
- Production code: 3F07
- Original air date: December 17, 1995

Guest appearances
- Lawrence Tierney as Don Brodka; Phil Hartman as Troy McClure

Episode features
- Chalkboard gag: "I will stop talking about the twelve inch pianist"
- Couch gag: Homer notices a plug in the middle of the floor and pulls it. Everyone and everything gets sucked down the drain.
- Commentary: Bill Oakley; Josh Weinstein; Mike Scully; Steven Dean Moore; David Silverman

Episode chronology
| ← Previous "The Simpsons 138th Episode Spectacular" | Next → "Team Homer" |
- The Simpsons season 7

"Marge Be Not Proud" is the eleventh episode of the seventh season of the American animated television series The Simpsons. It originally aired on Fox in the United States on December 17, 1995, exactly six years after the series premiere episode "Simpsons Roasting on an Open Fire". In the episode, Marge refuses to buy Bart the new video game Bonestorm, so he steals it from a local discount store. Bart is estranged from his mother after he gets caught, so he works to regain her love and trust.

The episode was written by Mike Scully and directed by Steven Dean Moore. Scully got the inspiration for it from an experience in his childhood when he shoplifted. Lawrence Tierney guest-starred in the episode as Don Brodka.

Since airing, the episode has received mostly positive reviews from television critics. It acquired a Nielsen rating of 9.5, and was the fourth highest-rated show on Fox the week it aired.

== Plot ==
As Christmas approaches, Bart wants the new video game Bonestorm, but Marge refuses to buy it because it is too violent, expensive, and distracts children from their school work. Unable to rent it or play Milhouse's copy, Bart visits the local Try-N-Save discount store, where Jimbo Jones and Nelson Muntz convince him to steal a copy. Bart is caught by security guard Detective Don Brodka, who calls Homer and Marge, but leaves a message because they are not home. Detective Brodka orders Bart to leave the store, threatening him with Christmas in juvenile hall if he comes back. Bart rushes home and successfully intercepts the message by switching out the answering machine tape with Allan Sherman's "Hello Muddah, Hello Faddah." Unaware of Bart's crime, Marge takes the family to the same store to get their annual Christmas picture taken, to Bart's horror. There, Bart is spotted by Detective Brodka, who shows Homer, Marge and the rest of the store the security footage of their son shoplifting.

A remorseful Bart tries to apologize to Marge. However, Marge is so traumatized over what her son did that she just tells Bart to go to bed. Concerned she may be mothering Bart too much, Marge leaves him out of family activities, such as making snow statues and decorating the Christmas tree. Realising he has lost Marge's love, Bart convinces Milhouse's mother, Luann, to spend time with him.

To regain his mother's love, Bart shops at the Try-N-Save and returns home with a bulge in his coat. Thinking he has shoplifted again, Marge confronts Bart, who reveals he bought a Christmas present for her: a photo of himself smiling (with the receipt attached, showing that it was paid in full). Overjoyed at getting this early Christmas gift, Marge forgives Bart and gives him his present: the golf simulator video game Lee Carvallo's Putting Challenge. Though underwhelmed, Bart still thanks her and they reconcile.

During the end credits, an unseen player (implied to be Bart) plays the Lee Carvallo video game and, after failing a shot (due to choosing the wrong type of club and making a far too powerful swing), declines the game's offer to continue playing.

== Production ==
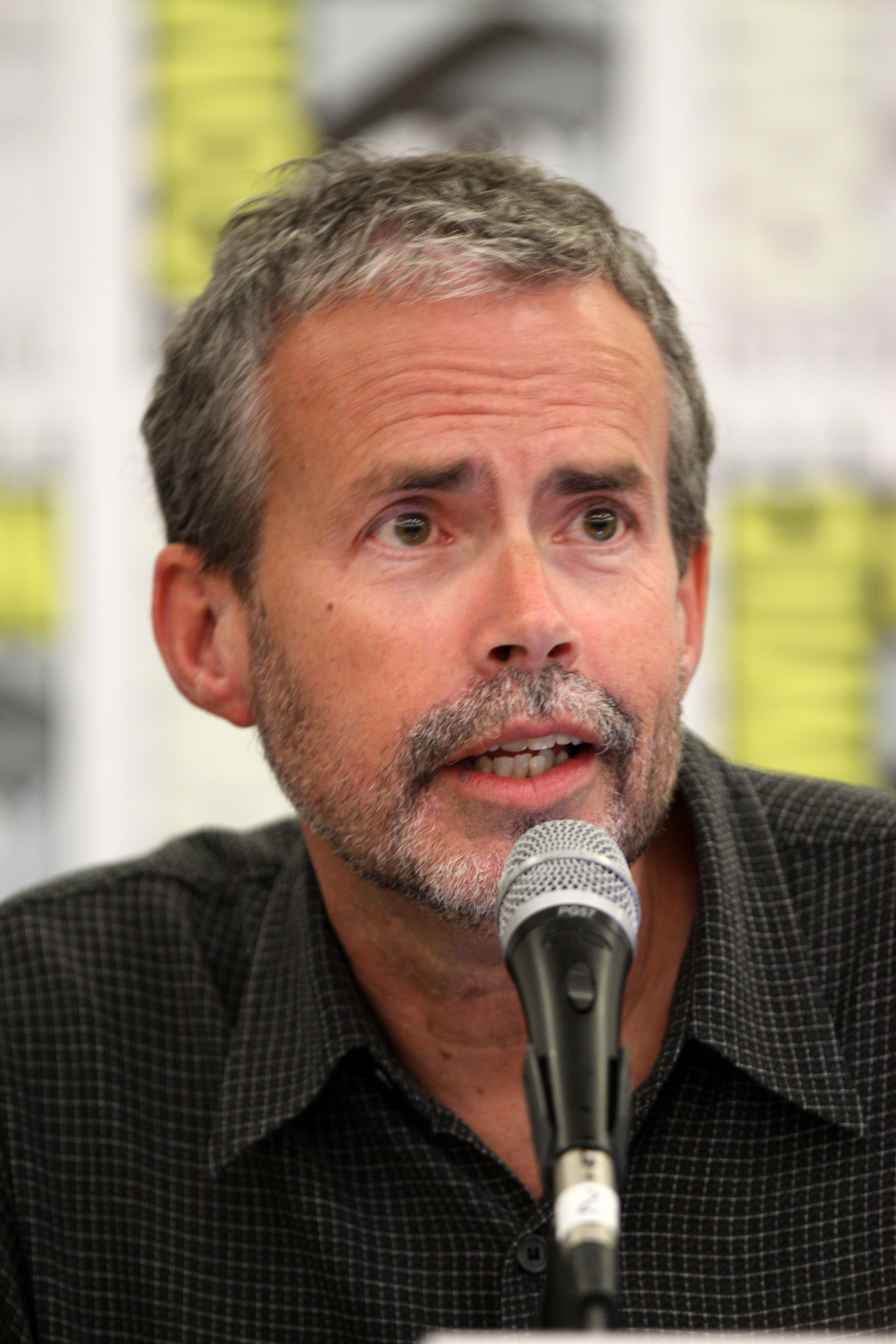
Mike Scully, the writer of "Marge Be Not Proud", based the episode on an experience in his own life.

Mike Scully, the writer of the episode, based it on an experience in his childhood. Scully was twelve years old when he paid a visit to the Bradlees discount department store in West Springfield, Massachusetts. A "bunch of guys" were shoplifting at the store, and they "pressured" Scully into shoplifting as well. He ended up getting caught outside, and "had one of the most traumatic moments" of his life. "To this day it still terrifies me", Scully said. He jokingly told Variety, "It's great to be paid for reliving the horrors of your life".

The episode was directed by Steven Dean Moore. The show runner of The Simpsons at the time, Bill Oakley thinks this is one of the most "beautifully" directed episodes of the show. He called the "hand-colouring" very "vivid" and "bright". The episode is the first Christmas episode the producers had done since the first episode of the series, "Simpsons Roasting on an Open Fire". Oakley said that nobody in the writing staff wanted to "try on Christmas" because it was "so famous" as being the first episode.

Lawrence Tierney guest-starred in the episode as Don Brodka. Another former show runner, Josh Weinstein, called Tierney's appearance "the craziest guest star experience we ever had". In addition to yelling at and intimidating employees of the show, Tierney made requests they considered unreasonable, such as abandoning his distinctive voice to do the part in a Southern accent and refusing to perform lines if he did not "get the jokes". Despite this, Oakley and Weinstein thought Tierney did a good job. Weinstein said, "He certainly delivered and he's one of my favorite characters we have had [on the show]".

"Marge Be Not Proud" originally aired on the Fox network in the United States on December 17, 1995. The episode was selected for release in a 1999 video collection of selected episodes, titled: Bart Wars. Other episodes included in the collection set were "Mayored to the Mob", "Dog of Death", and "The Secret War of Lisa Simpson". The episode was again included in the 2005 DVD release of the Bart Wars set. The episode was included in The Simpsons season seven DVD set, which was released on December 13, 2005. Oakley, Weinstein, Scully, Moore, and Silverman participated in the DVD's audio commentary.

== Reception ==
In its original broadcast, "Marge Be Not Proud" finished 47th in the ratings for the week of December 11 to 17, 1995, with a Nielsen rating of 9.5. The episode was the fourth highest-rated show on the Fox network that week, following a boxing match, Fox NFL Sunday, and The X-Files.

Since airing, the episode has received mostly positive reviews from television critics. The authors of the book I Can't Believe It's a Bigger and Better Updated Unofficial Simpsons Guide, Gary Russell and Gareth Roberts, wrote: "A Christmas special in all but name, and a touching look at the relationship between Marge and her growing Bart." Dave Foster of DVD Times said that "thanks to the keen eye of the writers and the rarely shown good side of Bart, this episode works very well as both an amusing insight to the way a child's mind works and as a strong relationship building episode between Bart and Marge."

DVD Movie Guide's Colin Jacobson said that despite being one of the "sappier" episodes at times, it "still packs some terrific laughs". Jacobson commented that he "absolutely lost it when Homer's drawing of a robot grilling a hot dog was seen – it's funnier if you see it – and Lawrence Tierney's guest turn as the store detective adds hilarious grit to the show." He added that the episode does not "fall into the classic" category, "but it offers more than enough entertainment to satisfy". Jennifer Malkowski of DVD Verdict considered the best part of the episode to be when a depressed Bart makes a snowman from the dirty, leftover snow under the car. She called the scene "amazingly pathetic". Malkowski concluded her review by giving the episode a grade of B.

In 2011, Richard Lawson of The Atlantic cited it as the best Christmas episode of The Simpsons, noting that "it's very sweet and there are some funny videogame jokes". He added that the episode "features a terrific guest starring voice performance from the late Lawrence Tierney". Raphael Bob-Waksberg, commenting on the influence of The Simpsons on BoJack Horseman, cited the episode as a favorite: "My favorite episode is 'Marge Be Not Proud,' where Bart steals a video game [creating a rift with his mother]. It's an insanely well-crafted joke episode but it's also incredibly sincere and beautiful and heartbreaking."

In The A.V. Club, Zack Handlen writes of the ending "there's a second or two when it seems like Bart's going to get everything he wanted; not just his mom back, but that stupid video game that started the whole mess. That would've been disastrous, narratively speaking, but it doesn't happen. Marge got him the game everyone's been talking about—Lee Carvallo's Putting Challenge. It's very funny, and Nancy Cartwright nails the strangled sound of Bart's first legitimate, and then completely faked, enthusiasm. But it's interesting that an episode that's all about valuing what you have as a kid, that parental love that is at once utterly uncool and the entire foundation of your life, ends on such an adult moment. Bart puts his mom's happiness ahead of his own disappointment, and that suggests, poor impulse control or not, he's capable of learning. Instead of pitching a fit about not getting the game he wanted he lies, because the gift doesn't matter. The giver does."

== Legacy ==
A playable, fan-made version of Lee Carvallo's Putting Challenge was released on June 15, 2020.
