= Bart the Fink =

- The Simpsons episode
- Episode no.: Season 7 Episode 15
- Directed by: Jim Reardon
- Story by: Bob Kushell
- Teleplay by: John Swartzwelder
- Production code: 3F12
- Original air date: February 11, 1996

Guest appearances
- Phil Hartman as Troy McClure; Bob Newhart as himself

Episode features
- Couch gag: The couch is a fax machine that spews out a piece of paper with the Simpson family in a sitting position.
- Commentary: Matt Groening; Bill Oakley; Josh Weinstein; Jim Reardon; David Silverman; David X. Cohen

Episode chronology
← Previous "Scenes from the Class Struggle in Springfield"	Next → "Lisa the Iconoclast"
- The Simpsons season 7

"Bart the Fink" is the fifteenth episode of the seventh season of the American animated television series The Simpsons. It originally aired on Fox in the United States on February 11, 1996. In this episode, Bart inadvertently exposes Krusty the Clown as one of the biggest tax cheats in American history. With his career ruined, Krusty fakes his own death and adopts an alias, until Bart and Lisa convince him to become a television clown again.

The episode was written by John Swartzwelder and Bob Kushell, and directed by Jim Reardon. Comedian Bob Newhart guest stars as himself. The episode's title is a play on the 1991 film Barton Fink.

Since airing, the episode has received mostly positive reviews from television critics. It acquired a Nielsen rating of 8.7, and was the fifth-highest-rated show on the Fox network the week it aired.

== Plot ==
The Simpson family attends the reading of a distant relative's will and walks away with $100 each. Marge forces Bart and Lisa to open bank accounts to teach them fiscal responsibility, but Bart opens a checking account instead and begins eagerly writing fake checks/cheques for his friends. He soon tries to obtain Krusty the Clown's autograph by slipping a check into his pocket, figuring that he will receive an endorsed copy of it with his monthly bank statement, but Krusty ends up endorsing the check with a stamp rather than a signature. Dismayed, Bart takes the check to the bank and asks if they can force Krusty to sign it.

Upon looking more closely at the check, the bank teller becomes suspicious of the offshore bank mentioned on Krusty's endorsement stamp and starts an investigation. The president of the offshore bank unintentionally exposes Krusty during questioning, and Krusty is quickly revealed as one of the biggest tax evaders in American history. Krusty is unable to pay off his debts all at once and the investigators are unwilling to put him in jail due to his fame, so they instead instruct the IRS to reclaim the lost revenue themselves by taking full control of Krusty's assets, nationalizing his businesses (including the Krusty the Clown Show as well as Krusty Burger), auctioning off most of his possessions at very cheap prices, and destroying any assets that cannot be sold or nationalized. With his star status quickly diminishing, a depressed Krusty soon crashes his airplane (which the IRS had forgotten to seize) into the side of Mount Springfield and is pronounced dead at the crash scene, devastating Bart as well as the entire town.

At the funeral, hosted by Troy McClure, several of Krusty's sidekicks from his show pay their respects (except Sideshow Bob) with Corporeal Punishment breaking down in tears, and Sideshow Mel presenting a statue in Krusty's honor, and McClure even makes Bob Newhart (who was waiting for his own funeral) give a eulogy. Following the funeral, however, Bart begins to see a familiar, but disguised, face roaming around Springfield and realizes that Krusty may still be alive. Lisa is the only one who believes him, and together they track the disguised Krusty down to the nearby docks. When they confront Krusty (now using the name "Rory B. Bellows"), he explains to them that he used the plane crash to fake his own death so he could escape his tax woes and start over as a longshoreman. While Krusty is initially happy with his humble new life, Bart and Lisa slowly begin to change his mind by reminding him of all the lavish perks he used to enjoy as a celebrity. Krusty eventually realizes that he can pay off his tax debts using his alter ego's life insurance, so he sabotages the boat to fake his own death once again, then swims back to the shore and returns to his old life.

== Production ==
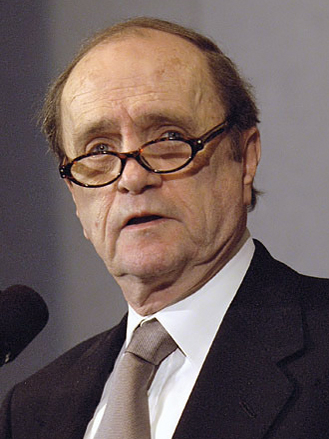
Bob Newhart guest-starred in the episode as himself. Many of his lines had to be cut because he talked very slowly.

"Bart the Fink" was written by John Swartzwelder, but Bob Kushell came up with the idea for it. The episode was based on the "big tax problems" that some celebrities, such as country singer Willie Nelson, had at the time. The idea of Krusty faking his own death was an idea the production team had wanted to do for a long time, and it was inspired by the rumors that American actor Andy Kaufman had faked his death. Bill Oakley and Josh Weinstein, the showrunners of seasons seven and eight of The Simpsons, came up with the beginning of the episode in which the family spends the night in a haunted house as the epitome of "the cruddiest beginning of any cruddy thing", but with the comedic twist that the family did not encounter any ghosts in the house and had their "best night's sleep ever". A similar joke (riffing on the clichéd nature of the setup) was used in the season 5 episode, "Homer Loves Flanders", with both episodes sharing the same haunted house model.

The episode was directed by Jim Reardon. Consultant David Mirkin suggested that the animators should add "some funny things" to the episode to "spice it up", such as the gorilla suit that one of the bank employees wear. After the audio recording of the script by the cast, the episode ended up being too long. Weinstein said one of the reasons for it was that Krusty talks very slowly, which drags out the time. They were only allowed to send twenty minutes' worth of audio to Film Roman for them to animate, but the audio track for the episode was twenty-six minutes long. Comedian Bob Newhart guest-starred in the episode as himself. Oakley said Newhart also talked very slowly, and they had to cut out more than half of his recorded lines. Many of the writers were big fans of Newhart and everybody wanted to see him record his lines. Oakley and Weinstein decided to shut down production so that the whole writing staff could go to the recording studio. The episode was recorded in a large room, which required everybody there to be very quiet. It took Newhart two and a half minutes to record his first take, and, as no one was allowed to laugh during that time, there was an "explosion" of laughter in the room when he finished. Parts of Phil Hartman's appearance as Troy McClure were also cut from the episode due to time limits.

== Cultural references ==
The episode's title is a play on the 1991 film Barton Fink. After losing his show and money, Krusty takes the bus home. An advertisement on the bus reads "Are you missing Mad About You right now? NBC Must See TV Sundays at 8 p.m." Krusty's airplane, "I'm-on-a-rolla-Gay", is a spoof of the Enola Gay B-29 airplane that dropped the atomic bomb on the Japanese city Hiroshima in World War II.

Krusty's illegal Cayman Islands "accountant" is modeled on the actor Sydney Greenstreet, particularly on his role in the film Casablanca. Swartzwelder is seen attending Krusty's funeral, while wearing a Kermit the Frog puppet on his hand.

The Sea Captain ends a phone call by saying "Call me back, Ishmael", a reference to the opening line in the novel Moby-Dick "call me Ishmael".

== Reception ==
In its original broadcast, "Bart the Fink" finished sixty-fourth in the ratings for the week of February 5–11, 1996, with a Nielsen rating of 8.7. The episode was the fifth highest-rated show on the Fox network that week, following Melrose Place, The X-Files, Beverly Hills, 90210 and Married... with Children.

"Bart the Fink" received generally positive reviews from television critics. DVD Movie Guide's Colin Jacobson called the episode a "winner" and praised it for the "one hundred tacos for $100" joke. Jennifer Malkowski of DVD Verdict said that the best part of the episode is when Homer comforts Bart following Krusty's death by assuring him that he, too, could wake up dead tomorrow.

In the book I Can't Believe It's a Bigger and Better Unofficial Simpsons Guide by Gary Russell and Gareth Roberts, they comment that "Bart the Fink" is "very fast and very good, with plenty of gags and effective set pieces. Bob Newhart's eulogy to Krusty is especially memorable." The authors of Media, Home, and Family, Stewart Hoover, Lynn Schofield Clark and Diane Alters wrote that "Krusty ultimately expertly proves the truth about the IRS: ruining the financial and emotional life of many [people]."

William Irwin, author of The Simpsons and Philosophy: The D'oh! of Homer, also praised the use of IRS in "Bart the Fink" to convey the message that "none of us can escape the unavoidable taxes". In addition, Chris Turner claims "Bart the Fink" offers a "pointed answer to the question of why such a manifestly miserable world of phonies and cheats would be so enticing to many". Kate Knibbs criticized the ending as being pat, but that it was an "otherwise deftly paced, funny episode."
