= Radioactive Man (The Simpsons episode) =

- The Simpsons episode
- Episode no.: Season 7 Episode 2
- Directed by: Susie Dietter
- Written by: John Swartzwelder
- Production code: 2F17
- Original air date: September 24, 1995

Guest appearances
- Mickey Rooney as himself; Phil Hartman as Troy McClure; Lionel Hutz

Episode features
- Chalkboard gag: "Bewitched does not promote Satanism"
- Couch gag: The couch is a fax machine that spews out a piece of paper with the Simpson family in a sitting position. The paper slides back under the couch.
- Commentary: Matt Groening; David Mirkin; Susie Dietter; David Silverman

Episode chronology
← Previous "Who Shot Mr. Burns? (Part Two)"	Next → "Home Sweet Homediddly-Dum-Doodily"
- The Simpsons season 7

"Radioactive Man" is the second episode of the seventh season of the American animated television series The Simpsons. It originally aired on Fox in the United States on September 24, 1995. In the episode, the film version of the comic book series Radioactive Man is shot in Springfield, with an open casting call put out for a local boy to play the hero's sidekick, Fallout Boy. Much to Bart's disappointment, the part goes to Milhouse. When he tires of the long hours required to shoot the film, Milhouse quits the role, forcing the filmmakers to cease production and return to Hollywood.

The episode was written by John Swartzwelder and directed by Susie Dietter. Mickey Rooney guest starred as himself in the episode. "Radioactive Man" was the first episode of The Simpsons to be digitally colored. The episode features cultural references to the 1960s Batman television series, the 1995 film Waterworld, and the song "Lean on Me" by Bill Withers.

Since airing, the episode has received positive reviews from fans and television critics. It acquired a Nielsen rating of 9.5, and was the fourth-highest-rated show on the Fox network that week.

== Plot ==
Bart and Milhouse are thrilled to learn a film version of their favorite comic book series, Radioactive Man, is being produced in Springfield. Several Springfield Elementary students audition for the role of Fallout Boy, Radioactive Man's sidekick. After Bart is rejected for being an inch too short (and his attempts to fake a growth spurt fail), Milhouse is cast as Fallout Boy opposite Rainier Wolfcastle as Radioactive Man despite the fact that he doesn't really want to be an actor at all. When Milhouse's parents hear their son will play Fallout Boy, they buy expensive luxury goods because they expect to "start living in the fast lane" now that their son is a Hollywood movie star.

Disappointed at losing the role, Bart remains Milhouse's friend and confidant. Milhouse's unease turns into disgust over how boring and stupid he finds the moviemaking process, and he disappears right before the filming of the most expensive scene at the Nuclear Power Plant. Production is suspended while the townspeople search for Milhouse. Bart finds him in his treehouse, where former child star Mickey Rooney unsuccessfully tries to convince Milhouse to finish the film, after the producers found Milhouse by tapping Bart's treehouse phone. Deeming Rooney an unsuitable replacement for Milhouse and because of all the price gouging, the bankrupt producers cancel the film and return to Hollywood, where they are greeted with open arms and are happy to be back "where people treat each other right."

== Production ==
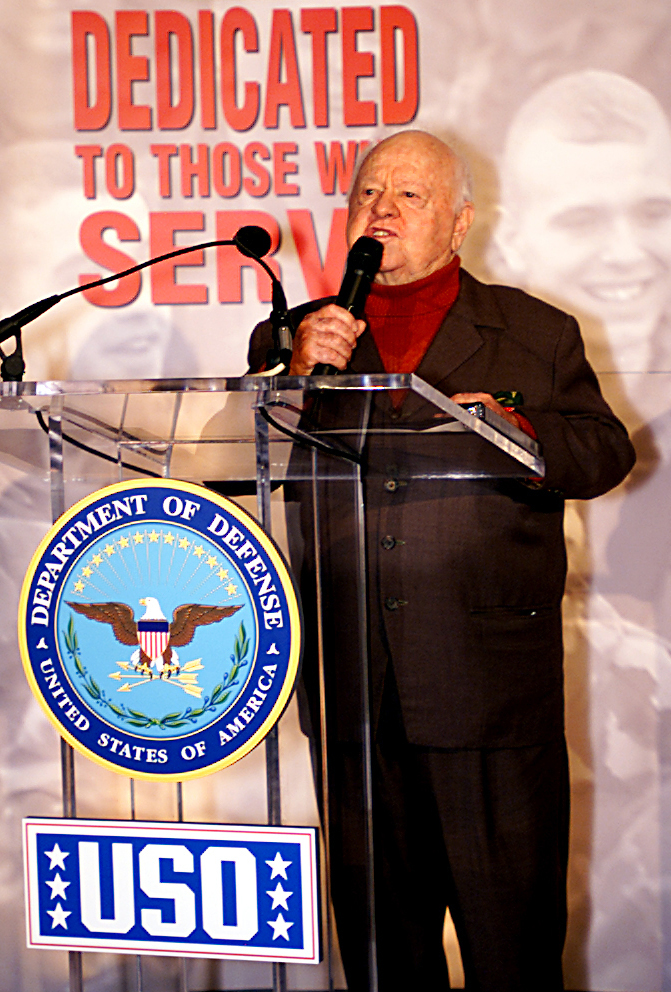
Mickey Rooney guest starred as himself in the episode.

The episode was written by John Swartzwelder, and directed by Susie Dietter. When Dietter read through his first script, she did not find it very funny because of all the visual gags. Once the animatic was finished, she thought: "Hey, this is really funny!"

This is the first episode of The Simpsons to be digitally colored. The duties of that task went to USAnimation, which also provided digital animation for "The Simpsons 138th Episode Spectacular". After said episode, digital coloring would not be attempted again until season 12's "Tennis the Menace", and again in season 14's "Treehouse of Horror XIII". The show permanently switched to digital animation a few episodes later, beginning with "The Great Louse Detective".

Mickey Rooney guest starred as himself in the episode. Nancy Cartwright recalls in her autobiography My Life as a 10-Year-Old Boy that Rooney recorded his lines with the other actors. Although he was late for the session, she comments that he was "so full of pep" and very enthusiastic about the role.

== Cultural references ==
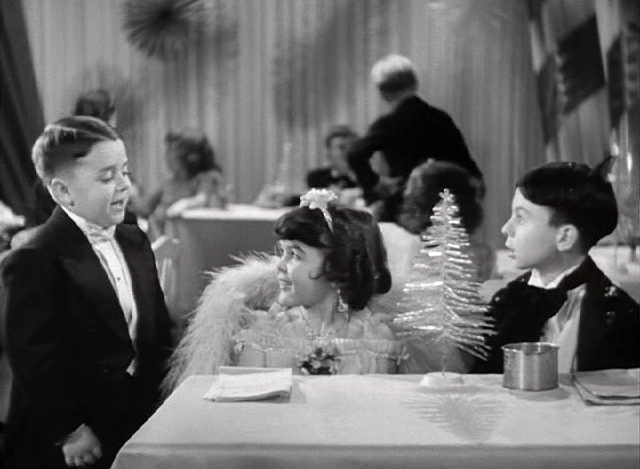
The character Alfalfa (right) from The Little Rascals is referenced in the episode.

The Radioactive Man character is based on Batman, and several scenes in the episode reference the Batman television series from the 1960s. A Radioactive Man antagonist, The Scoutmaster, is based on actor/comedian Paul Lynde. The scene in the new Radioactive Man film where Radioactive Man and Fallout Boy are captured in Aquaworld is a reference to the 1995 film Waterworld. Because Waterworld's July 1995 release date happened long after the animation on the episode had been completed, the references to it in this episode are related to the information available about its setting during filming (post-apocalyptic flooded Earth) and budget issues (it was the most expensive film ever made at the time at $175 million estimated).

The director of the Radioactive Man film says: "That Milhouse is going to be big, Gabby Hayes big!", in reference to the (not all that big) American actor Gabby Hayes. Moe Szyslak, the bartender of Moe's Tavern, says that he, as a kid, played the part of Smelly on The Little Rascals, until he killed Alfalfa for stealing his schtick. Moe mentions that "William Faulkner could write an exhaust pipe gag that could really make you think", a reference to the author's time in Hollywood. Before his audition, Bart recites "Now is the winter of our discontent" from Shakespeare's Richard III. Bill Withers' 1972 song "Lean on Me" is played at the end of the episode.

In one scene, Comic Book Guy sends a message to other Internet nerds about who will star in the new Radioactive Man film, two of whom are the nerds Homer met in "Homer Goes to College", and one is Prince dressed in a purple suit. The last nerd is Curtis Armstrong, with an appearance resembling his Revenge of the Nerds character Booger. The usenet newsgroup to which he posts the message (alt.nerd.obsessive) is a reference to the alt.tv.simpsons newsgroup.

== Reception ==
In its original broadcast, "Radioactive Man" finished 51st in the ratings for the week of September 18 to September 24, 1995. It acquired a Nielsen rating of 9.5. The episode was the fourth-highest-rated show on the Fox network that week, following The X-Files, Beverly Hills, 90210, and Melrose Place.

Since airing, the episode has received mostly positive reviews from fans and television critics. The authors of the book I Can't Believe It's a Bigger and Better Updated Unofficial Simpsons Guide, Gary Russell and Gareth Roberts, called the episode a "wonderful pastiche" on the Tim Burton Batman films, and added that Milhouse is an obvious candidate for Fallout Boy. DVD Movie Guide's Colin Jacobson enjoyed the episode, but he does not consider it a "classic". He said that it offers "more than a few amusing bits", and added that "spoofing the movie business isn't anything new, but the show does it well in this solid program". Jennifer Malkowski of DVD Verdict considered the best part of the episode to be when Krusty tries to prove the "range" of different characters he can portray to the casting director. The website concluded its review by giving the episode a grade of A−.

Graham Beckwith of The Lantern singled out Rainier Wolfcastle's line "My eyes! The goggles do nothing!" from the episode as one of The Simpsons' "greatest one liners". Total Film's Nathan Ditum ranked Rooney's performance as the eighth-best guest appearance in the show's history, commenting that he is "desperately funny and self-effacing as a parody of his fallen child-star self." Erik Adams of The A.V. Club said the episode balances satire and warmth with panache, portraying an industry with a distressingly blase attitude toward caustic materials ('The goggles do nothing!') while effectively explaining why anyone would want to join that industry's workforce in the first place. There is a magical sensation given off during the creative process, provided that you play 'keeper away-er' between that process and those who seek to exploit it. That drive to entertain can be a destructive force, but as Bart and Milhouse demonstrate at the end of 'Radioactive Man,' it's powerless in the face of a strong friendship.
