= Team Homer =

- The Simpsons episode
- Episode no.: Season 7 Episode 12
- Directed by: Mark Kirkland
- Written by: Mike Scully
- Production code: 3F10
- Original air date: January 7, 1996

Episode features
- Chalkboard gag: "I am not certified to remove asbestos"
- Couch gag: The Simpsons run to and sit on the couch as normal and the camera zooms in on a nearby mousehole, where a family of mice resembling the Simpsons scurries to and sits on its couch.
- Commentary: Matt Groening; David Mirkin; Mike Scully; Mark Kirkland

Episode chronology
← Previous "Marge Be Not Proud"	Next → "Two Bad Neighbors"
- The Simpsons season 7

"Team Homer" is the twelfth episode of the seventh season of the American animated television series The Simpsons. It originally aired on Fox in the United States on January 7, 1996. In the episode, Homer starts a bowling team with Moe, Apu, and Otto. When Mr. Burns discovers the team was funded with his money, he insists on joining, but the team fears he will cost them the league championship. In the subplot, Bart's "Down with Homework" T-shirt incites a school riot, so Principal Skinner implements a uniform dress code.

The episode was written by Mike Scully and directed by Mark Kirkland. Scully came up with the idea for it when he went bowling one day. The episode features cultural references to Mad magazine and the film Caddyshack. It is one of the last episodes to feature voice actress Doris Grau, and is dedicated to her memory.

Since airing, the episode has received mostly positive reviews from television critics. It acquired a Nielsen rating of 9.4, and was the third highest-rated show on the Fox network the week it aired.

== Plot ==
Homer and his teammates — Moe, Apu and Otto — are unable to afford the $500 fee to join a bowling league. Homer asks his boss to sponsor the team while he happens to be anesthetized, so Mr. Burns unwittingly signs a check. The newly named Pin Pals enter a bowling competition. They beat three teams and move to second place in their league. After recovering from his ether-induced stupor, Burns discovers he wrote a check to Homer and insists on joining the Pin Pals, replacing Otto. Homer and the team fear they will lose the championship, since Burns can barely bowl due to his frail physique.

Burns gives the Pin Pals new bowling shirts before the championship game. Two pins away from victory, Burns takes his turn on the lane. When Otto tips over a claw arcade machine by accident, the vibrations knock down the pins and the Pin Pals win. As the team celebrates, Burns takes the trophy and keeps it for himself. Encouraged by his teammates, Homer attempts to break into Burns' mansion to recover the trophy; this ends disastrously when Burns releases the hounds and Homer is severely mauled.

At school, Bart's Mad iron-on "Down with homework" T-shirt incites a student riot, so in order to prevent another similar incident, Principal Skinner forces students to wear uniforms, but not before explaining to Bart how that similar incident caught him and his fellow soldiers by surprise during the Vietnam War in the year 1968 first (obviously due to his knowledge about Mad magazines). The uniforms restore discipline but demoralize the students, and they slowly begin to lose their individual mannerisms, even blinking in unison, much to the delight of Skinner, who celebrates turning the kids into lifeless and depressed zombies. However, a rainstorm soaks through the uniforms, causing their grey dye to run and separate into vivid tie-dye color patterns that revive the students' spirits and disregard of Skinner's authority, forcing him to rescind the dress code.

== Production ==
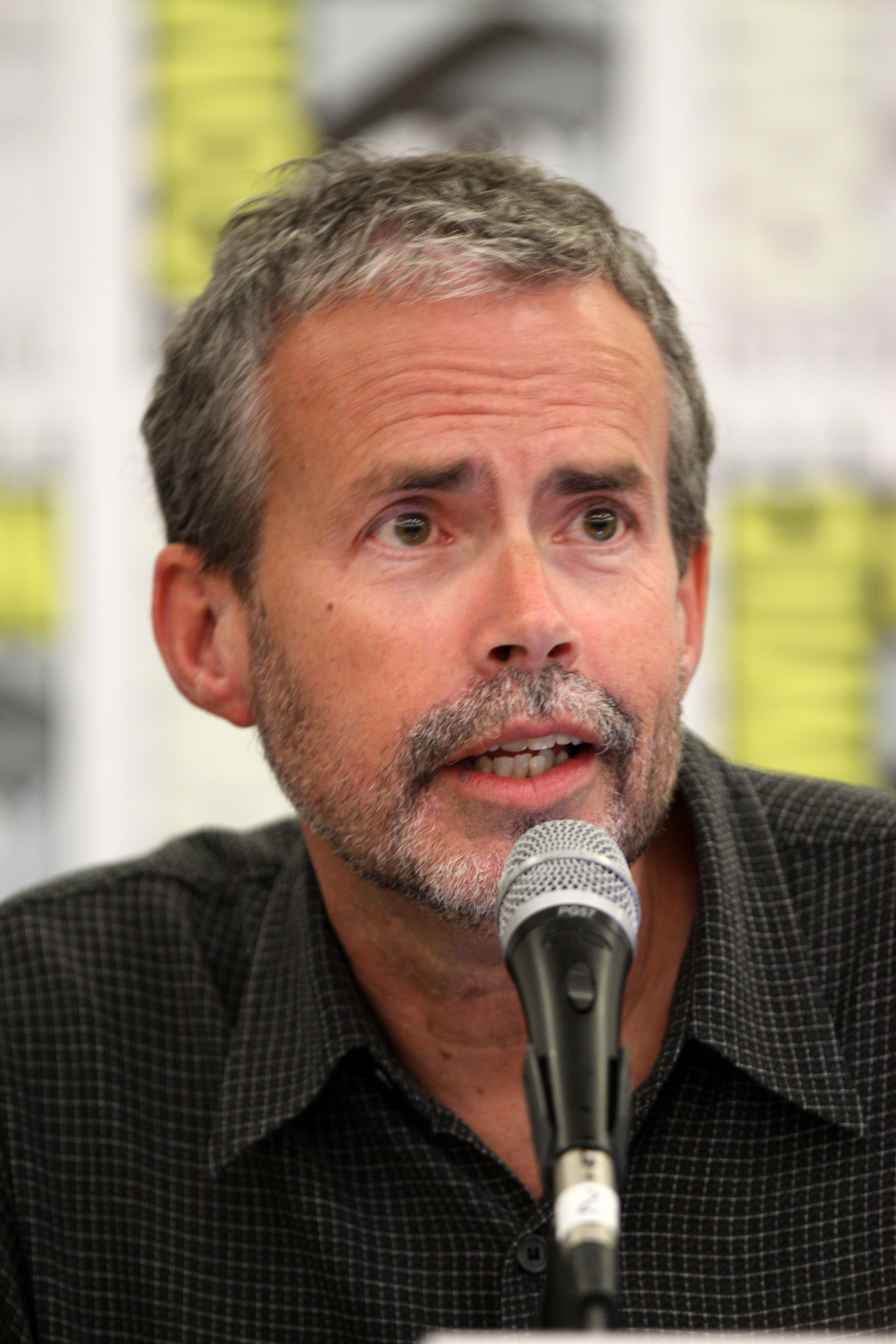
Mike Scully wrote the episode. He came up with the idea for it when he went bowling one day.

The episode was written by Mike Scully. He was bowling "a lot" at the time, and one day when he was bowling, he came up with the idea for "Team Homer". The idea for the school plot came later in production when the school that Scully's children went to was thinking of introducing school uniforms. Both Scully and his children were against it so he decided to put it in the episode.

David Mirkin, former show runner of The Simpsons, thought the episode was "really fun" because there were "lots of characters" in it and it featured "lots of terrific animation". Mirkin liked that viewers could see the different characters "team up" and how they pair off. "It's kind of cool to see them hang around like this. Particularly Homer's group which has some nice emotion and they really comes together as a group", Mirkin commented.

The episode was directed by Mark Kirkland. When he first read the script, he thought the challenge of the episode was that the bowling theme had already been covered in the season one episode "Life on the Fast Lane". Since it had been done before, Kirkland felt pressure to make the bowling alley look "really good". Kirkland and his team of The Simpsons animators at Film Roman all went over to a local bowling alley and had lunch. They inspected the whole alley for inspiration and drew sketches. "Life on the Fast Lane" deals with Marge becoming infatuated with Jacques, a French bowling instructor. Mirkin points out that Jacques makes a brief appearance in this episode, but without a speaking role. Also appearing with non-speaking roles are Mindy Simmons, Lurleen Lumpkin, and Princess Kashmir, the three women who almost broke up Marge and Homer's marriage.

Mirkin remembered the episode "very fondly" because when it was finished, the staff received customized The Simpsons bowling balls, bowling bags, and Pin Pal shirts as gifts. Scully said the bowling balls were "really cool" because they were yellow and had The Simpsons logo on them.

Doris Grau, script supervisor for the show and voice of Lunchlady Doris, died on December 30, 1995, from respiratory failure at a hospital in Los Angeles, California. "Team Homer" was one of the last episodes to feature her voice, and included a dedication to her.

In one scene, Homer tells Marge: "We were so close to winning the championship. Now, thanks to Burns, it's never going to happen. And I spent so much time building that trophy case." The scene then cuts to the trophy case with an Academy Award in it that Homer has stolen. In the original Fox broadcast, the name in the inscription on the Academy Award was Haing S. Ngor. In American syndication and the season seven DVD, the name was changed to Don Ameche (who had won for Cocoon). Ngor, who won an Academy Award for Best Supporting Actor for the 1984 film The Killing Fields, was murdered on February 25, 1996, between the original and the syndicated broadcast. Producers were concerned the syndicated episode would imply Homer had murdered Ngor to steal the statue.

== Cultural references ==
Bart and Milhouse buy an issue of Mad magazine. Bart also puts a Mad iron-on reading "Down with Homework" on one of his T-shirts, which causes controversy at school. Milhouse is shocked to see the new school uniforms, and his jaw drops, a "Woody Allen-esque" type of joke. The final bowling scene is similar to the final golfing scene in the 1980 film Caddyshack. Homer references the song "Mr. Roboto" by Styx. Moe's unsuccessful attempt to sideline Mr. Burns by hitting his leg with a crowbar is done in a similar manner to Shane Stant's attempt in 1994 to sideline figure skater Nancy Kerrigan by physical assault. "Spanish Flea" plays while Martin and Lisa model the new uniforms. Mr. Burns' ether-induced hallucinations cause him to perceive Homer as Poppin' Fresh and Hans Moleman as "that delightful TV leprechaun."

== Reception ==
In its original broadcast, "Team Homer" finished 58th in the ratings for the week of January 1–7, 1996, with a Nielsen rating of 9.4. The episode was the fourth highest-rated show on the Fox network that week, following The X-Files, Beverly Hills, 90210, and Married... with Children.

Since airing, the episode has received mostly positive reviews from television critics.

DVD Movie Guide's Colin Jacobson said that to his surprise, "the dress code plot works the best". He liked the mockery of Mad magazine and the "overemphasis on the way it disrupts the educational process". Jacobson thought the bowling plot had plenty of "nice moments" too, and "these add up to a solid show". Jennifer Malkowski of DVD Verdict considered the best part of the episode to be when Homer ends a phone conversation with the "highly quotable" line, "I gotta go. My damn wiener kids are listening." Malkowski concluded her review by giving the episode a grade of A−. Mirkin described the episode as "excellent", and praised Scully's "great" script.

The episode received criticism from the authors of the book I Can't Believe It's a Bigger and Better Updated Unofficial Simpsons Guide, Gary Russell and Gareth Roberts, who said that "Team Homer" is one of their least favorite episodes. They thought the school uniform plot was "a lot more satisfying than the bowling story". They added that the scene where Martin and Lisa model the new uniforms is the highlight of the episode.

It was named the fifth best episode of the show by MSNBC. They praised how the episode utilized Burns's physical weaknesses for laughs, and Homer's line; "I guess some people never change. Or, they quickly change and then quickly change back."
