= Summer of 4 Ft. 2 =

- The Simpsons episode
- Episode no.: Season 7 Episode 25
- Directed by: Mark Kirkland
- Written by: Dan Greaney
- Production code: 3F22
- Original air date: May 19, 1996

Guest appearance
- Christina Ricci as Erin

Episode features
- Couch gag: The couch is a fax machine that spews out a piece of paper with the Simpson family in a sitting position.
- Commentary: Bill Oakley; Josh Weinstein; Dan Greaney; Yeardley Smith; David Silverman

Episode chronology
← Previous "Homerpalooza"	Next → "Treehouse of Horror VII"
- The Simpsons season 7

"Summer of 4 Ft. 2" is the twenty-fifth and final episode of the seventh season of the American animated television series The Simpsons. It originally aired on the Fox network in the United States on May 19, 1996. In the episode, the Simpson family stay in Ned Flanders' beach house. Hanging around with a new set of children, Lisa becomes popular, while Bart is left out. Bart tries to sabotage his sister's newfound acceptance, but fails.

The episode was written by Dan Greaney and directed by Mark Kirkland. It guest-stars Christina Ricci. The beach house at Little Pwagmattasquarmsettport the Simpson family stays in is based on then-showrunner Josh Weinstein's parents' house in New Hampshire. The episode features cultural references to the George Lucas film American Graffiti, Pippi Longstocking, The New Yorker character Eustace Tilley, and Alice and The Hatter from Alice's Adventures in Wonderland.

Since airing, the episode has received positive reviews from television critics. It acquired a Nielsen rating of 8.8, and was the second highest-rated show on the Fox network the week it aired.

== Plot ==
On the last day of school, Lisa realizes how unpopular she is when nobody signs her yearbook. Her disappointment grows when she sees students lining up to get Bart's signature. Ned Flanders offers the Simpsons the use of his beach house for the summer. Marge suggests that Bart bring Milhouse and Lisa invite a friend. Realizing she has no friends, Lisa decides to change her image to gain popularity. She leaves behind her nerdy belongings, since she fears they would make people like her less. At the beach house, Lisa tells Marge she forgot to pack, so she buys new clothes, hoping they will make her look cool to other children.

Lisa succeeds in making friends by acting detached and hiding her intelligence. Bart grows jealous because Lisa becomes more popular than he is, in part by using some of his own trademark quips like, "Aye, caramba!" to fit in. When Bart sees Lisa skateboarding and being accepted, he figures he will be a shoo-in with her new friends, but instead is mocked as a Dennis the Menace try-hard. Bart exacts revenge by showing Lisa's yearbook to her new friends, exposing her as a smart overachiever, as well as her lies; Lisa runs away in tears. The next day, Bart begins to heckle Lisa at breakfast, and she is angry at him for supposedly ruining her newfound friendships. Later, Marge, Bart, Lisa and Milhouse visit a carnival, where Bart only heckles Lisa more until he finally regrets how low he stooped to ruin her life.

After the carnival, Lisa returns to the beach house to find her friends decorating the Simpsons' car with seashells in her honor (much to Homer's horror). They explain that she does not need to fake being cool because they like her for her true self. To make amends with Lisa, Bart gets her new friends (and Milhouse) to sign her yearbook, which he hands to her as the family drive back to Springfield.

== Production ==
The episode was written by Dan Greaney, and directed by Mark Kirkland. It was Greaney's second episode on The Simpsons. The staff of the show wanted to do a summer episode because there was "so much stuff" about summer vacations that they felt had to be covered in an episode. David Silverman, one of the show's animators, particularly liked the episode because he thought it captured the feeling of being on summer vacation.

The area in which the Flanders family's beach house is located is based on the Cape Cod peninsula. Many of the writers of The Simpsons spent time on Cape Cod so they decided to model the new locations on it. The animators looked at Cape Cod photographs to get inspiration for the episode, and one of the show's background designers, Lance Wilder, grew up in that area. The beach house is based on then-show runner Josh Weinstein's parents' house in New Hampshire, which the writers had visited many times. They played several board games when they were there, which gave them the idea to have the Simpson family play the Mystery Date board game in the episode. Silverman said that the episode was difficult to animate and direct because it had so many new and detailed backgrounds and completely different locations.

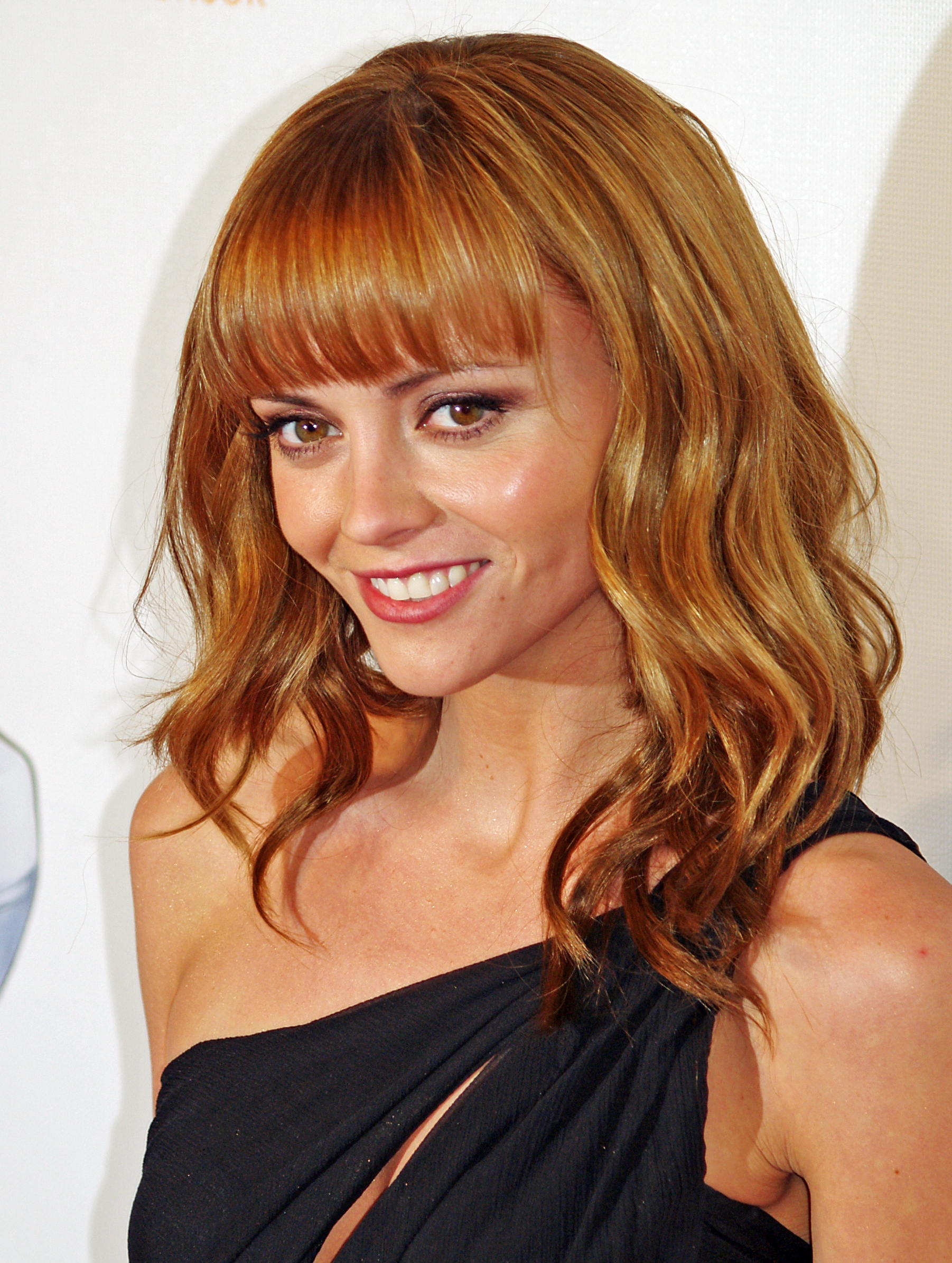
Christina Ricci guest starred in the episode.

American actress Christina Ricci guest starred in the episode as Erin, one of Lisa's new friends. Ricci was not able to come to the recording studio, so she recorded all of her lines over an ISDN line. Weinstein, who was a fan of Ricci, was pleased with her performance.

== Cultural references ==
The episode's title is a parody of the 1971 film Summer of '42. Lisa has a daydream in which the following fictional characters appear: Pippi Longstocking, The New Yorker character Eustace Tilley, and Alice and The Hatter from Alice's Adventures in Wonderland, attempting to entice her back to literature. Lisa references Gore Vidal and regarded him (or, at least, his books) as one of her only friends. Milhouse compares Lisa's new appearance to the character Blossom from the American television series Blossom. TeeJay's ZayMart is a spoof of defunct retailer Zayre and parent company T.J. Maxx. Homer replicates a scene from the 1973 film American Graffiti when he nonchalantly buys some stereotypically embarrassing products at the store in order to get some illegal fireworks. The Mystery Date board game that the family is forced to play is an actual Milton Bradley Company board game from the 1960s. Weinstein recalled playing it as a child and claimed it to be "a very disappointing game to play as a little boy" because of the female target audience. Lisa says she learned the word crustacean from Baywatch. Also a nod to American Graffiti, the Beach Boys song "All Summer Long" plays during the credits.

== Reception ==
In its original broadcast, "Summer of 4 Ft. 2" finished forty-second (tied with Melrose Place and Married... with Children) in the ratings for the week of May 13 to May 19, 1996, with a Nielsen rating of 8.8. The episode was the second highest-rated show on the Fox network that week (tied with Melrose Place and Married... with Children), following The X-Files.

Since airing, the episode has received positive reviews from television critics. The authors of the book, I Can't Believe It's a Bigger and Better Updated Unofficial Simpsons Guide, Gary Russell and Gareth Roberts, wrote: "This episode will strike a chord with anyone that's ever tried to fit in with the crowd [...] Lisa gets to show the many facets of her character, and there's a superb slapstick sequence as Homer tries to dispose of a firework."

Dave Foster of DVD Times praised the episode and said: "The episode is quite simply my favourite Lisa episode regardless of season. From calm to cool and fiercely aggressive, we've rarely seen Lisa so enticing as we do here, and the episode's many elements including the side stories for the other family members culminate in one of the finest this season has to offer."

DVD Movie Guide's Colin Jacobson enjoyed the episode and said that he likes how it addresses Bart's resentment of Lisa's popularity. "Granted, it makes [Bart] a little too mean, but it's entertaining", he added. Jacobson went on to say: "Marge gets the best moment again, as I love watching her non-violent approach to the bumper cars."

Jennifer Malkowski of DVD Verdict considered the best parts of the episode to be the scenes that feature Milhouse, particularly his yearbook message to Lisa and the scene with the Mystery Date board game. She concluded her review by giving the episode a grade of A.

Voice actress Yeardley Smith has cited the episode as one of her favorite Simpsons episodes of all time. When The Simpsons began streaming on Disney+ in 2019, former Simpsons writer and executive producer Bill Oakley named the episode as one of the best classic Simpsons episodes to watch on the service. Mark Stock, writing for the website The Manual, chose the episode as one of the 10 best Simpsons episodes. Dennis Perkins writes "The storytelling instincts here—as in most of season seven—are flawless, the achingly lovely denouement of Lisa’s story used as a launching pad for the episode’s biggest laugh. As a capper to one of the show’s best seasons, 'Summer Of 4 Ft. 2' finds everything in Springfield, even during a detour to Little Pwagmattasquarmsettport, in perfect balance."
