= Home Sweet Homediddly-Dum-Doodily =

- The Simpsons episode
- Episode no.: Season 7 Episode 3
- Directed by: Susie Dietter
- Written by: Jon Vitti
- Production code: 3F01
- Original air date: October 1, 1995

Guest appearance
- Joan Kenley as the telephone lady

Episode features
- Chalkboard gag: "No one wants to hear from my armpits"
- Couch gag: Homer, Marge, Bart, Lisa, Maggie, Grampa, Santa's Little Helper, and Snowball II are in a nine-square grid as seen in the opening credits of The Brady Bunch.
- Commentary: Matt Groening; Bill Oakley; Josh Weinstein; Jon Vitti; Susie Dietter

Episode chronology
← Previous "Radioactive Man"	Next → "Bart Sells His Soul"
- The Simpsons season 7

"Home Sweet Homediddly-Dum-Doodily" is the third episode of the seventh season of the American animated television series The Simpsons. It originally aired on Fox in the United States on October 1, 1995. In the episode, following a series of misunderstandings, the Simpson children are put in foster care at Ned and Maude Flanders' house. Homer and Marge are forced to attend a parenting class to get their children back.

The episode was written by Jon Vitti and directed by Susie Dietter. The story was pitched by another writer on the show, George Meyer. It was the first episode in which writers Bill Oakley and Josh Weinstein served as show runners. The episode features cultural references to the 1965 film Faster, Pussycat! Kill! Kill! and Sonny & Cher's song "I Got You Babe".

Since airing, the episode has received positive reviews from television critics. It acquired a Nielsen rating of 9.0, and was the fourth highest-rated show on the Fox network the week it aired.

== Plot ==
During a school day, Bart is found to have head lice due to letting a monkey crawl on his head and Lisa is forced to walk barefoot after her shoes are stolen by bullies. Believing that Homer and Marge are negligent parents, the school staff alert Social Services. Meanwhile, Homer and Marge are spending their day at a spa, having left their house a mess. Despite having promised themselves to clean up after returning home, two Child Protective Services agents arrive at their house at the worst possible time, finding it under the negligent and incompetent care of Grampa. They take Bart, Lisa, and Maggie to a foster home, which turns out to be their four next-door neighbors Ned, Maude, Rod, and Todd Flanders. Bart and Lisa hate living with the Flanders due to all activities being strictly religious, being served bland food, and having to go to bed at only 7 o'clock. However, Maggie enjoys it since she gets more attention from Ned than she ever did from Homer. Meanwhile, Marge and Homer are forced to attend a parenting class to regain custody of their children.

During a quiz game of Bible questions, Ned becomes concerned when he learns the Simpson children know nothing of Christian history; something which the Flanders family believes one should start learning at baptism. When Lisa reveals that they have never been baptized, Ned becomes so distraught that he drives them to the Springfield River. When Homer and Marge are declared fit parents, they quickly head for the river to stop Ned from baptizing their children. Just as Ned is about to pour holy water on Bart, Homer pushes Bart away and the water falls on him instead, inadvertently making him a baptized member of the Flanders family. The Simpsons are reunited and head home together.

== Production ==
"Home Sweet Homediddly-Dum-Doodily" was the first episode to be made after Bill Oakley and Josh Weinstein became show runners of The Simpsons. They wanted to start the season with an episode centering on the Simpson family. The story was pitched by writer George Meyer at a story retreat. Story retreats were held twice a year at a hotel room close to the studio lot, where all the writers gathered to pitch their ideas. Seventeen episodes were pitched at this particular story retreat. Out of them all, Weinstein considered this episode to be the best, and he thought the pitch by Meyer was the best he had ever heard. Oakley and Weinstein selected former full-time staff writer Jon Vitti to write the episode, wanting a "heavy hitter", since it was going to start the seventh production season. Vitti retained in his script most of what Meyer pitched at the retreat.

The episode was directed by Susie Dietter. A statue portraying The Simpsons writer John Swartzwelder stands outside the courthouse in the episode. Oakley said that this was a mistake because he and Weinstein thought that Springfield was located in Swartzwelder County, incorrectly going off a montage in the season three episode "Dog of Death". Said montage depicts Springfield as being located in Springfield County; Swartzwelder is the adjoining county. The appearance of the female Child Protective Services agent is based on a high school teacher disliked by both Oakley and Weinstein. Cast member Hank Azaria's voice for Cletus was slightly distorted in this episode because, over the summer between seasons, Azaria and the producers had forgotten what Cletus sounded like.

== Cultural references ==
Ned and Maude Flanders sing Maggie to bed with their own version of Sonny & Cher's song "I Got You Babe". The Itchy & Scratchy cartoon that Lisa and Bart watch is called "Foster, Pussycat! Kill! Kill!", a reference to the 1965 film Faster, Pussycat! Kill! Kill! Flanders says that he used to let his sons watch My Three Sons, but it got them "all worked up" before bedtime. The headline of a newspaper that Marge gives to Lisa for her history project is "40 Trampled at Poco Concert", while another reads "America loves Ted Kennedy". While riding in Flanders's car, Maggie spins her head around with a scary smile on her face to look at Bart and Lisa, as in the 1973 film The Exorcist. After the accidental baptism, Homer says he feels like "St. Augustine of Hippo after his conversion by Ambrose of Milan."

== Reception ==
In its original broadcast, the episode finished 53rd in the ratings for the week of September 25 to October 1, 1995, with a Nielsen rating of 9.0. The episode was the fourth highest-rated show on the Fox network that week, following The X-Files, Beverly Hills, 90210, and Melrose Place.

Since airing, the episode has received mostly positive reviews from television critics.

DVD Movie Guide's Colin Jacobson enjoyed the episode, saying that "its best elements come from the amusing bizarreness of the Flanders home, but Homer and Marge’s classes are also fun. Chalk this one up as season seven's first great episode."

Jennifer Malkowski of DVD Verdict considered the best part of the episode to be when Marge tells Bart and Lisa that someday they will have to be adults and take care of themselves, just before Homer comes to Marge about a spider near his car keys. She concluded her review by giving the episode a grade of B+.

The authors of the book I Can't Believe It's a Bigger and Better Updated Unofficial Simpsons Guide, Gary Russell and Gareth Roberts, called it "one of the most disturbing episodes, as Bart and Lisa are dragged into the Flanders' sinister lifestyle." They thought the ending, when Ned tries to baptize the children, was "nail-biting stuff", and Maggie speaking was "a truly shocking moment". The authors added: "It's astonishing that anything this radical made it on to prime time television. The final moments are perhaps the most moving in the entire series, a wonderful affirmation of everything the series, and the Simpson family, are about."

Matt Groening, the creator of The Simpsons, thought the episode was "fantastic" and he called it one of his favorites. He particularly liked the ending which he thought was "sweet".

David Sims writes of the ending: "It’s a hell of a moment, not remotely oversold, just the kind of material The Simpsons still nailed perfectly by its seventh season. This episode begins one of the most challenging and exciting periods in the show’s run, with a batch of episodes that messed with the formula and reality of the show in a really good way."
