= Susie Dietter =

American director

Susan E. Dietter, usually credited as Susie Dietter, is an American director, known primarily for her work on television cartoons. She has directed episodes of the popular series Futurama, Baby Blues, The Simpsons, Recess and The Critic. She also worked as an animator for the modern-day Looney Tunes "Museum Scream" and "My Generation G... G... Gap".

Dietter was a nominee for the 2000 Annie Award for Outstanding Individual Achievement for Directing in an Animated Television Production for her direction of the Futurama episode "A Bicyclops Built for Two". She also shared an Emmy Award-nomination for Outstanding Animated Series with her fellow producers of Futurama.

== Directing credits ==
=== Simpsons episodes ===
- "Bart Gets Famous" [Season 5, 3.2.1994]
- "Bart's Girlfriend" [Season 6, 6.11.1994]
- "A Star Is Burns" [Season 6, 5.3.1995]
- "Radioactive Man" [Season 7, 24.9.1995]
- "Home Sweet Homediddly-Dum-Doodily" [Season 7, 1.10.1995]
- "Scenes from the Class Struggle in Springfield" [Season 7, 4.2.1996]
- "Much Apu About Nothing" [Season 7, 5.5.1996]
- "Lisa's Date with Density" [Season 8, 15.12.1996]
- "Grade School Confidential" [Season 8, 6.4.1997]
- "Lisa the Simpson" [Season 9, 8.3.1998]
- "Yokel Chords" [Season 18, 4.3.2007]

=== Futurama episodes ===
- "A Big Piece of Garbage"
- "A Bicyclops Built for Two"
- "The Honking"
- "The Cyber House Rules"
- "Godfellas"
- "Less Than Hero"
