= The Simpsons season 6 =

Season of television series

The Simpsons
- Season 6
- DVD cover featuring Homer Simpson, Maggie Simpson, Marge Simpson, Groundskeeper Willie, Santa's Little Helper, Moe Szyslak and Waylon Smithers
- Showrunners: David Mirkin (23 episodes); Al Jean; Mike Reiss (2 episodes)
- No. of episodes: 25

Release
- Original network: Fox
- Original release: September 4, 1994 – May 21, 1995

Season chronology
- ← Previous; Season 5 Next → Season 7

The sixth season of the American animated sitcom The Simpsons aired on Fox between September 4, 1994, and May 21, 1995. The Simpsons is an animated series about a working class family, which consists of Homer, Marge, Bart, Lisa, and Maggie. The show is set in the fictional city of Springfield, and lampoons American culture, society, television and many aspects of the human condition.

The showrunner for the sixth production season was David Mirkin who executive-produced 23 episodes. Former showrunners Al Jean and Mike Reiss produced the remaining two; they produced the two episodes with the staff of The Critic, the show they left The Simpsons to create. This was done in order to relieve some of the stress The Simpsons' writing staff endured, as they felt that producing 25 episodes in one season was too much. The episode "A Star Is Burns" caused some controversy among the staff, with Matt Groening removing his name from the episode's credits, as he saw it as blatant advertising for The Critic, which Fox had picked up for a second season after being cancelled by ABC and with which Groening had no involvement. Fox moved The Simpsons back to its original Sunday night timeslot from season 1, having aired on Thursdays from season 2 through season 5. It has remained in this slot ever since. The sixth season won one Primetime Emmy Award (for the episode "Lisa's Wedding"), and received three additional nominations. It also won the Annie Award for Best Animated Television Production.

The Complete Sixth Season DVD was released in the United States on August 16, 2005, September 28, 2005, in Australia, and October 17, 2005, in the United Kingdom. The set featured a plastic "clam-shell" Homer-head design and received many complaints. In the United States, the set contained a slip of paper informing purchasers how to request alternate packaging — which consisted of a case-sleeve in a similar style to the standard box design — for only a shipping and handling fee.

== Production ==
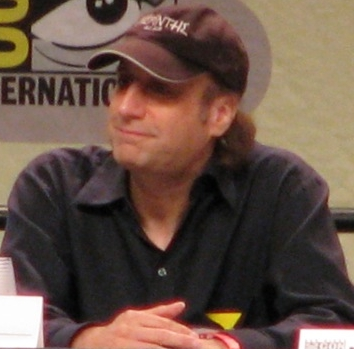
David Mirkin was showrunner for this season

David Mirkin served as showrunner and executive producer for season six, having worked in the same capacity on the previous season, while the season was produced by Gracie Films and 20th Century Fox Television. Due to Fox's demand for 25 episodes for the season, which the writers felt was impossible to achieve, former showrunners Mike Reiss and Al Jean returned to produce two episodes ("A Star Is Burns" and "'Round Springfield") with the staff of their show The Critic, to relieve some of the stress on The Simpsons' writing staff.

David Cohen, Jonathan Collier, Jennifer Crittenden, Brent Forrester, Ken Keeler, Bob Kushell, David Sacks, Mike Scully, Joshua Sternin, and Jennifer Ventimilia all received their first writing credits during season six. Steven Dean Moore and Swinton O. Scott III received their first directing credit. Other credited writers included Greg Daniels, Dan McGrath, Bill Oakley, John Swartzwelder, Jon Vitti and Josh Weinstein. Other directors included Bob Anderson, Wes Archer, Susie Dietter, Mark Kirkland, Jeffrey Lynch, Jim Reardon and David Silverman.

The main cast consisted of Dan Castellaneta (Homer Simpson, Grampa Simpson, Krusty the Clown, among others), Julie Kavner (Marge Simpson, Patty and Selma Bouvier), Nancy Cartwright (Bart Simpson, Ralph Wiggum, Nelson Muntz, among others), Yeardley Smith (Lisa Simpson), Hank Azaria (Moe Szyslak, Apu, Chief Wiggum, among others) and Harry Shearer (Ned Flanders, Mr. Burns, Principal Skinner, among others). Other cast members included Doris Grau (Lunchlady Doris), Pamela Hayden (Milhouse Van Houten, among others), Tress MacNeille (Agnes Skinner, among others), Maggie Roswell (Maude Flanders, among others), Russi Taylor (Martin Prince, among others) and Marcia Wallace (Edna Krabappel). Guest stars included Anne Bancroft, Mel Brooks, Kelsey Grammer, Phil Hartman, Larry King, Susan Sarandon, Patrick Stewart, Meryl Streep and Winona Ryder.

The season's first two episodes, "Bart of Darkness" and "Lisa's Rival", were held over from the previous season, as production was delayed because of the 1994 Northridge earthquake. "A Star Is Burns" caused some controversy among the staff with series creator Matt Groening removing his name from the episode's credits as he saw it as blatant advertising for The Critic, which had moved from ABC to Fox for its second season and was scheduled to follow The Simpsons. The season finale "Who Shot Mr. Burns?" (which aired in two parts, the second acting as the following season's premiere) came from Groening, who had wanted to do an episode in which Mr. Burns was shot, which could be used as a publicity stunt. The writers decided to write the episode in two parts with a mystery that could be used in a contest. It was important for them to design a mystery that had clues, took advantage of freeze frame technology, and was structured around one character who seemed the obvious culprit.

During the production of the season, Groening and Brooks pitched a live-action spin-off series centered on Krusty the Clown (expected to be portrayed by Dan Castellaneta) entitled Krusty (although they began planning the series since 1992). Groening and Michael Weithorn wrote a pilot episode where Krusty moved to Los Angeles and got his own talk show. A recurring joke throughout the script was that Krusty lived in a house on wooden stilts which were continuously being gnawed by beavers. Eventually, the contract negotiations fell apart and Groening decided to stop work on the project.

== Voice cast & characters ==
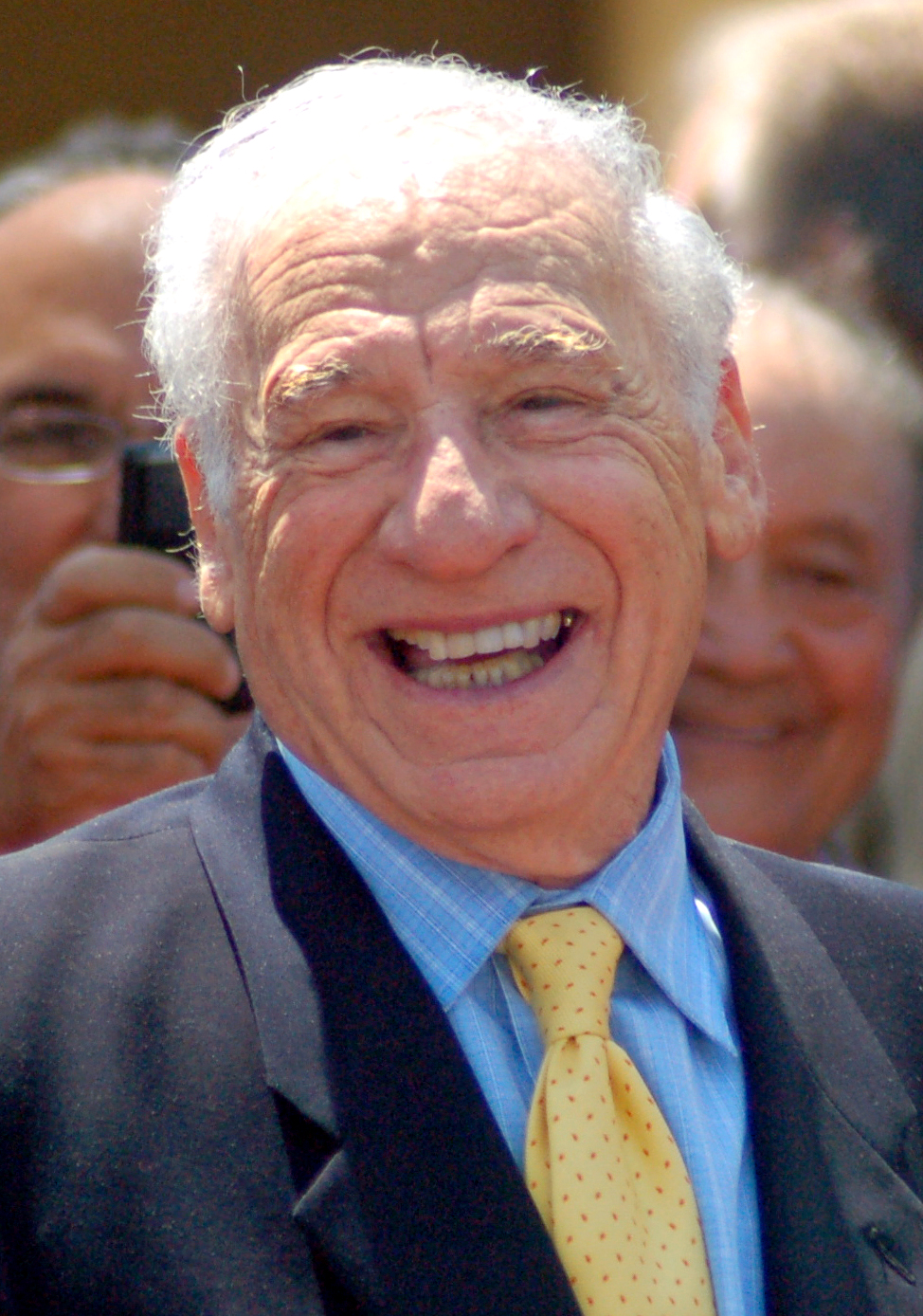
Mel Brooks appeared as himself in "Homer vs. Patty and Selma"

=== Main cast ===
- Dan Castellaneta as Homer Simpson, Hans Moleman, Krusty the Clown, Grampa Simpson, Mayor Quimby, Barney Gumble, Groundskeeper Willie, Kodos, Arnie Pye, Adult Martin Prince, Sideshow Mel, Louie, Bill, Leopold and various others
- Julie Kavner as Marge Simpson, Patty Bouvier, Selma Bouvier, Jacqueline Bouvier and various others
- Nancy Cartwright as Bart Simpson, Nelson Muntz, Ralph Wiggum, Rod Flanders, Todd Flanders, Kearney Zzyzwicz, Lewis, Database and various others
- Yeardley Smith as Lisa Simpson
- Hank Azaria as Chief Wiggum, Lou, Moe Szyslak, Scratchy, Professor Frink, Roger Meyers Jr., Carl Carlson, Captain McCallister, Old Jewish Man, Apu, Snake Jailbird, Luigi Risotto, Legs, Rich Texan, Kirk Van Houten, Dr. Nick Riviera, Superintendent Chalmers, Veterinarian, Captain McCallister, Comic Book Guy, Bumblebee Man and various others
- Harry Shearer as Principal Skinner, Otto Mann, Dr. Hibbert, Ned Flanders, Dewey Largo, Waylon Smithers, Mr. Burns, Lenny Leonard, Birch Barlow, Jasper Beardsley, Kang, Rainier Wolfcastle, Kent Brockman, Principal Skinner, Reverend Lovejoy, Clancy Bouvier, George H. W. Bush, Marty, Dave Shutton, God, Eddie, Herman Hermann, Jebediah Springfield and various others

=== Recurring ===
- Doris Grau as Lunchlady Doris and various others
- Pamela Hayden as Jimbo Jones, Milhouse Van Houten, Richard and various others
- Tress MacNeille as Agnes Skinner, Dolph Starbeam and various others
- Maggie Roswell as Maude Flanders, Miss Hoover, Luann Van Houten, Helen Lovejoy, Ham and various others
- Russi Taylor as Martin Prince, Sherri and Terri, Uter Zorker and various others

=== Guest stars ===
- Kelsey Grammer as Sideshow Bob (2 episodes)
- Phil Hartman as Troy McClure, Lionel Hutz, Evan Conover, and Judah Ben-Hur (8 episodes)
- Jon Lovitz as Artie Ziff and Jay Sherman (2 episodes)
- Marcia Wallace as Edna Krabappel (8 episodes)
- Winona Ryder as Allison Taylor ("Lisa's Rival")
- Albert Brooks as Jacques ("Another Simpsons Clip Show")
- Sara Gilbert as Laura Powers ("Another Simpsons Clip Show")
- Michelle Pfeiffer as Mindy Simmons ("Another Simpsons Clip Show")
- Michael Carrington as Announcer ("Another Simpsons Clip Show")
- Larry King as himself ("Sideshow Bob Roberts")
- Dr. Demento as himself ("Sideshow Bob Roberts")
- Henry Corden as Fred Flintstone ("Sideshow Bob Roberts")
- James Earl Jones as an alternate timeline Maggie Simpson ("Treehouse of Horror V")
- Meryl Streep as Jessica Lovejoy ("Bart's Girlfriend")
- Dennis Franz as himself playing Homer Simpson ("Homer Badman")
- Anne Bancroft as Dr. Zweig ("Fear of Flying")
- The cast of Cheers: Ted Danson as Sam Malone, Woody Harrelson as Woody Boyd, Rhea Perlman as Carla Tortelli, John Ratzenberger as Cliff Clavin and George Wendt as Norm Peterson ("Fear of Flying")
- Patrick Stewart as Number One ("Homer the Great")
- Dick Cavett as himself ("Homie the Clown")
- Johnny Unitas as himself ("Homie the Clown")
- Joe Mantegna as Fat Tony ("Homie the Clown")
- Mel Brooks as himself ("Homer vs. Patty and Selma")
- Susan Sarandon as Ballet Teacher ("Homer vs. Patty and Selma")
- Maurice LaMarche as George C. Scott, William Shatner, Jay Sherman's burp, and Eudora Welty's burp ("A Star Is Burns")
- Mandy Patinkin as Hugh Parkfield ("Lisa's Wedding")
- Frank Welker as Santa's Little Helper and various animals ("Two Dozen and One Greyhounds")
- Steve Allen as himself ("'Round Springfield")
- Ron Taylor as "Bleeding Gums" Murphy ("'Round Springfield")
- Tito Puente as himself ("Who Shot Mr. Burns?")

== Reception ==
The season was critically acclaimed and remains popular among the show's fans. Reviews of the premiere "Bart of Darkness" in 1994 said the show was "just as strong and funny as it ever was," while the writing continued to be "crisp, hilarious and multi-layered." On Rotten Tomatoes, the sixth season of The Simpsons has a 100% approval rating based on 7 critical reviews. A 2010 appraisal of the show by IGN described the season as "hilarious", singling out the episodes "Treehouse of Horror V", "Itchy & Scratchy Land and "Bart vs. Australia" for praise. Entertainment Weekly's 2003 list of the show's best 25 episodes included four from this season: "Itchy & Scratchy Land", "Treehouse of Horror V", "Homer Badman" and "Who Shot Mr. Burns?".

Fox moved The Simpsons back to its original Sunday night time of 8 p.m., having aired it on Thursdays for the previous four seasons. It has remained in this slot ever since. The Simpsons was the network's "most popular series" and was moved in conjunction with Fox's purchase of the rights to the National Football League's National Football Conference games, which it would be airing on Sundays and was hoping would boost its Sunday night programs' ratings. Having been against The Cosby Show on Thursdays, the show was now against Lois & Clark: The New Adventures of Superman (ABC), seaQuest DSV (NBC) and Murder, She Wrote (CBS). "Bart of Darkness" finished 44th in the ratings for the week of August 29 to September 4, 1994, with a Nielsen rating of 8.9 and an audience share of 17%. The episode was the third highest rated show on the Fox network that week. This was down on the previous season's premiere "Homer's Barbershop Quartet" (12.7), and its finale "Secrets of a Successful Marriage" (9.8). The season finale "Who Shot Mr. Burns?" finished 51st with a rating of 8.7, the fifth highest rated Fox show of the week.

The sixth season won one Primetime Emmy Award, and received three additional nominations. "Lisa's Wedding" won the Emmy for "Outstanding Animated Program (for Programming One Hour or Less). Alf Clausen received a nomination in the category "Outstanding Individual Achievement in Music Composition for a Series (Dramatic Underscore)" for "Treehouse of Horror V", while he and John Swartzwelder were nominated for "Outstanding Individual Achievement in Music and Lyrics" for the Stonecutters' song "We Do" in the episode "Homer the Great". Finally, "Bart vs. Australia" was nominated for "Outstanding Individual Achievement in Sound Mixing for a Comedy Series or a Special". For the previous two seasons, the producers had nominated the show for Outstanding Comedy Series, failing each time. The show won the Annie Award for Best Animated Television Program in 1995 for season six, while Cartwright won the Annie for Voice Acting in the Field of Animation.

== Episodes ==
| No. overall | No. in season | Title | Directed by | Written by | Original release date | Prod. code | U.S. viewers (millions) |
|---|---|---|---|---|---|---|---|
| 104 | 1 | "Bart of Darkness" | Jim Reardon | Dan McGrath | September 4, 1994 | 1F22 | 15.1 |
A heat wave is gripping Springfield and the townspeople attempt to cool down. Bart and Lisa persuade Homer to buy them a swimming pool, which proves popular with the town's other children. Bart ends up breaking his leg when he dives off his treehouse and is forced to spend the rest of the summer in his room. Realizing that he has become isolated, Lisa gives Bart her telescope to cheer him up. Using it, he witnesses Ned Flanders digging a grave and through his ramblings, becomes convinced that Ned has killed his wife Maude. Lisa's popularity increases due to the pool, but she is quickly abandoned when Martin Prince's parents buy a bigger pool. Bart sends Lisa over to the Flanders' house to look for proof of the "crime", only for Ned to return, holding an axe. However, he is merely putting it away; and it is revealed that Maude is still alive and well, and all that Ned killed was her favorite plant. The episode ends with Martin's pool being destroyed due to overcrowding, instantly evaporating his newfound popularity.
| 105 | 2 | "Lisa's Rival" | Mark Kirkland | Mike Scully | September 11, 1994 | 1F17 | 16.7 |
A new student named Allison Taylor arrives at Springfield Elementary School and proves to be more than a match for Lisa in both educational and musical feats. After Allison wins first chair saxophone in the school orchestra ahead of her, Lisa vows to defeat Allison at something: by winning the school diorama contest. Meanwhile, Homer steals 500 pounds of sugar from an overturned truck and decides to sell it to the town. However, despite his best efforts to guard his sugar mound, a rainstorm dissolves it. At the contest, Bart switches Allison's diorama of "The Tell-Tale Heart" with a cow's heart to help Lisa win. Lisa's guilt at the plan forces her to give Allison's real model back. The pair set aside their differences and become friends. Principal Skinner decides that neither Allison nor Lisa's entry deserves to win, awarding victory to Ralph Wiggum for his mint-condition Star Wars collectibles. Guest star: Winona Ryder
| 106 | 3 | "Another Simpsons Clip Show" | David Silverman | Jon Vitti (Note: Credited as "Penny Wise", because Vitti did not wish to be credited for writing a clip show.) | September 25, 1994 | 2F33 | 13.5 |
After reading The Bridges of Madison County, Marge decides that she and Homer need to teach the kids about romance. Each of the Simpsons (using clips from previous episodes) reminisce about past romantic encounters, leaving them all depressed and believing that love does not work. However, Homer saves the day by pointing out that one relationship has succeeded, his and Marge's.
| 107 | 4 | "Itchy & Scratchy Land" | Wes Archer | John Swartzwelder | October 2, 1994 | 2F01 | 14.8 |
Bart and Lisa convince their parents to take their family vacation at the newly opened Itchy & Scratchy Land. After experiencing several of the violent attractions, Homer and Marge go to "Parents Island", while Bart and Lisa continue to explore the park. The vacation seems to be going well, until Bart and Homer are both apprehended by the park security for assaulting costumed staff members. Professor Frink realizes that all of the park's Itchy & Scratchy robots will turn on their masters; an event which proves true as a horde of Itchy and Scratchy robots advance on the Simpsons. Homer throws everything he can at them, before discovering that a camera's flash destroys the robots. The family take more cameras from a gift shop and defeat the Itchy & Scratchy army. Roger Meyers, Jr. thanks them, and the Simpsons agree that it was actually their best vacation ever.
| 108 | 5 | "Sideshow Bob Roberts" | Mark Kirkland | Bill Oakley & Josh Weinstein | October 9, 1994 | 2F02 | 14.4 |
After pleading his case on air to right-wing talk show host Birch Barlow, Sideshow Bob is released from prison. Soon, Bob is announced as the Republican candidate for mayor of Springfield. Bart and Lisa help campaign for Mayor Quimby but despite their efforts, Bob wins the election with a landslide majority. Immediately, Bart finds himself sent back to kindergarten by order of the new mayor. Within days, the Simpsons awake to find that their house will soon be demolished to make way for the planned Matlock Expressway. Bart and Lisa begin to suspect that Bob somehow rigged the election. While searching through the voter records, Lisa is left a message by someone who claims to know what actually happened. The whistleblower turns out to be Waylon Smithers, who dislikes some of Bob's policies. He gives Bart and Lisa the name of a man who voted for Bob, but had really been long dead. The pair discover that virtually every single person who supposedly voted for Bob is actually dead. At the trial, Bart and Lisa trick Bob into confessing his crime, and he is put back in prison. Guest stars:Kelsey Grammer, Larry King, Dr. Demento, Phil Hartman, Henry Corden
| 109 | 6 | "Treehouse of Horror V" | Jim Reardon | Bob Kushell | October 30, 1994 | 2F03 | 22.2 |
| 109 | 6 | "Treehouse of Horror V" | Jim Reardon | Greg Daniels & Dan McGrath | October 30, 1994 | 2F03 | 22.2 |
| 109 | 6 | "Treehouse of Horror V" | Jim Reardon | David X. Cohen | October 30, 1994 | 2F03 | 22.2 |
A Halloween special which is divided into three short stories: "The Shinning": A parody of the 1980 film The Shining, in which Homer tries to kill the rest of the family after Mr. Burns cuts off the beer supply and cable TV in his winter home.; "Time and Punishment": A parody of "A Sound of Thunder"; While attempting to fix it, Homer creates a time machine out of his toaster.; "Nightmare Cafeteria": To solve the problems of overcrowded detention and lack of meat, the Springfield Elementary teachers resort to eating the students.; Guest star: James Earl Jones Note: Groundskeeper Willie is killed three times in this episode by an axe to the back, once in each story.
| 110 | 7 | "Bart's Girlfriend" | Susie Dietter | Jonathan Collier | November 6, 1994 | 2F04 | 15.3 |
Bart becomes attracted to Reverend Lovejoy's daughter Jessica, but finds his attempts to impress her repeatedly ignored. After pulling a prank on Groundskeeper Willie, and offending Jessica's parents at dinner, she becomes interested in him. As they begin a relationship, Bart believes that Jessica is a bad influence on him and decides against seeing her anymore. However, at church Bart has to sit next to Jessica, who steals the money from the church collection plate and frames him for the crime. Next week, Lisa tells the congregation that Jessica was the real perpetrator, and suggests they search Jessica's room. The money is found hidden under Jessica's bed, and she admits to the crime. Guest star: Meryl Streep
| 111 | 8 | "Lisa on Ice" | Bob Anderson | Mike Scully | November 13, 1994 | 2F05 | 17.9 |
Lisa discovers that she is failing gym class. In order to pass, she joins a local ice hockey team as their goalie. This creates an intense sibling rivalry between her and Bart, who is jealous of Lisa's abilities because he had always been the family's star hockey player. Marge tries to resolve their conflicts by reminding them that they are not in competition with each other, but this backfires as the next fixture is between Bart and Lisa's teams. During the match, Bart prepares to take a penalty against Lisa, but remembering past events in which they helped each other, the pair throw aside their equipment and embrace, tying the game and sparking a riot between the rivaling supporters.
| 112 | 9 | "Homer Badman" | Jeffrey Lynch | Greg Daniels | November 27, 1994 | 2F06 | 15.5 |
Homer and Marge attend a candy convention, where Homer successfully steals a gummy Venus de Milo. Later, after Homer takes the children's babysitter Ashley Grant home, he notices that the gummy Venus has become stuck to her pants and grabs it, an action that Ashley misinterprets as a sexual advance. A mob of protesters soon appear at the Simpsons' house, claiming that Homer sexually harassed Ashley. All of Homer's attempts to prove himself innocent go wrong, until he tells his side of the story on a public-access television. Groundskeeper Willie sees Homer's speech and gives him a secretly recorded video tape that shows Homer was innocent after all. Guest star: Dennis Franz
| 113 | 10 | "Grampa vs. Sexual Inadequacy" | Wes Archer | Bill Oakley & Josh Weinstein | December 4, 1994 | 2F07 | 14.1 |
Homer and Marge's marriage is beginning to sour due to their fading sex lives. Grampa concocts a tonic that successfully cures their problems. The effectiveness of the tonic results in he and Homer going into business together, selling "Simpson and Son's Tonic" to the public. When they visit the farmhouse where Homer grew up, the two get into an argument, resulting in Grampa calling Homer an "accident". Homer refuses to speak to Grampa ever again, and vows to be a better father to his own children. Later, he goes back to the farmhouse, coincidentally at the same time as Grampa. Both of them accidentally set fire to the building, and reconcile.
| 114 | 11 | "Fear of Flying" | Mark Kirkland | David Sacks | December 18, 1994 | 2F08 | 15.6 |
After being banned from Moe's for life, Homer goes to a pilots' bar. There, he is mistaken as a real pilot and destroys a plane. As payment for his silence, the Simpsons are given free tickets to anywhere in the continental United States. Marge becomes uneasy on the plane and admits that she has a fear of flying, putting the vacation on hold. Marge undergoes treatment with therapist Dr. Zweig, who uncovers the roots of Marge's fear. The problem she has is that her father was a male flight attendant. Zweig assures her that male flight attendants are now very common, and Marge is ostensibly cured. Guest star: Anne Bancroft
| 115 | 12 | "Homer the Great" | Jim Reardon | John Swartzwelder | January 8, 1995 | 2F09 | 20.1 |
Homer discovers that Lenny and Carl are members of the ancient secret society known as the Stonecutters. Gaining membership through Grampa, Homer takes great pleasure in the society's many privileges and events. Unfortunately, during a celebratory dinner he unwittingly destroys the Stonecutter's "Sacred Parchment". Homer is stripped of his membership, until it is discovered that he is "The Chosen One" who will lead the Stonecutters to glory. Homer's reign eventually alienates his fellow members, who break off and form a new society known as "The Ancient Mystic Society of No Homers", banning Homer from joining. Guest star: Patrick Stewart
| 116 | 13 | "And Maggie Makes Three" | Swinton O. Scott III | Jennifer Crittenden | January 22, 1995 | 2F10 | 17.3 |
Homer regales the long story of Maggie's birth. Back in 1993, Homer dreams of working at the bowling alley, even though it pays less than his job at the Power Plant. Homer works out a way that means the family will have enough to live on, as long as everything stays exactly the way it is. However, Marge becomes pregnant once again, but tries to keep the news from Homer. He eventually finds out and, because of the impending financial problems, is forced to go back to the Power Plant. As much as he dreads the idea of having another child, when Maggie is born Homer immediately falls in love with her.
| 117 | 14 | "Bart's Comet" | Bob Anderson | John Swartzwelder | February 5, 1995 | 2F11 | 18.7 |
During detention, Bart accidentally discovers a comet. It is then discovered that the comet is heading straight for Springfield, and a rocket is launched to destroy it. However, it misses and blows up the only bridge out of town, dooming everyone in Springfield. The Simpsons and the Flanders share the bomb shelter that Ned had built, to hopefully protect themselves from the comet. Soon, everyone in town joins them in the shelter, but the door cannot be closed unless somebody leaves. Homer decides that the only useless person there is Ned, and forces him to go. Homer then feels guilty about his decision and leaves, with the rest of the town following him. However the danger is averted when the comet enters the atmosphere and burns up in the thick layer of pollution.
| 118 | 15 | "Homie the Clown" | David Silverman | John Swartzwelder | February 12, 1995 | 2F12 | 17.5 |
Krusty's poor gambling skills and wasteful habits land him in deep financial trouble, and to make up for it he launches a training college for clowns. Homer enters the program, and after graduating he impersonates Krusty at the events that the real Krusty deems unworthy of his personal appearance. Homer discovers that, mistaken for Krusty, he receives all sorts of benefits from authority figures and businesses. The impersonation goes too far when Homer is kidnapped by Fat Tony's mob, to whom the real Krusty is indebted. Luckily, the real Krusty arrives and his and Homer's lives are spared after they entertain the mob with an elaborate clown trick. Guest star: Joe Mantegna
| 119 | 16 | "Bart vs. Australia" | Wes Archer | Bill Oakley & Josh Weinstein | February 19, 1995 | 2F13 | 15.1 |
In order to prove Lisa wrong about the coriolis effect, Bart calls several locations in the southern hemisphere. He collect calls Australia, but the call lasts six hours and costs $900.00. After the call's recipient complains, Australia indicts Bart for fraud. The United States State Department negotiates a settlement, with Bart having to publicly apologize in Australia. There, after Bart apologizes, the parliament wishes to give him the additional punishment of a booting. Bart and Homer flee, but Bart later agrees to accept the booting anyway. Before he can be punished, he moons the Australians and the family leave in a helicopter.
| 120 | 17 | "Homer vs. Patty and Selma" | Mark Kirkland | Brent Forrester | February 26, 1995 | 2F14 | 18.9 |
After a bad investment, Homer is forced to borrow money from Patty and Selma. In return the pair make Homer's life miserable. After Marge finds out, Homer decides to become a chauffeur, but is pulled over when he does not have a chauffeur's license. When he goes to apply for one, Patty and Selma (the DMV examiners) mercilessly fail him on all counts. The pair begin to smoke, but are told by their supervisor such an action could cost them their promotions. Homer acts quickly and claims the cigarettes are his own, saving Patty and Selma, in exchange for clearing his debt to them. Meanwhile, Bart is forced to take ballet but finds that he enjoys it. Guest stars: Mel Brooks and Susan Sarandon
| 121 | 18 | "A Star Is Burns" | Susie Dietter | Ken Keeler | March 5, 1995 | 2F31 | 14.4 |
Springfield adopts Marge's suggestion of a film festival, in which any of the townspeople can enter a short film. To help her judge, Jay Sherman comes from New York City to stay at the Simpsons' house. Homer feels threatened by Jay, and so Marge puts him on the panel as well. At the festival, the vote becomes deadlocked between Mr. Burns' self-glorifying biopic and Barney's touching film about alcoholism. Homer, originally supporting Hans Moleman's film Man Getting Hit by Football, is convinced to vote for Barney's film, which wins the competition. Guest star: Jon Lovitz
| 122 | 19 | "Lisa's Wedding" | Jim Reardon | Greg Daniels | March 19, 1995 | 2F15 | 14.9 |
At a renaissance fair, a fortune teller predicts the story of Lisa's first true love. She explains that Lisa will fall madly in love with British student Hugh Parkfield. The pair's relationship grows, with Hugh eventually proposing to Lisa. The wedding will take place in Springfield, but Lisa becomes embarrassed with her family's behavior, particularly Homer's. Hugh begins to bond with them, until Homer presents him with a pair of tacky cuff links, which he grudgingly agrees to wear at the wedding. He does not actually wear them, and when questioned by Lisa he states that after the wedding they will return to England and avoid all but minimal contact with her family. Disgusted, she calls off the wedding. Guest star: Mandy Patinkin
| 123 | 20 | "Two Dozen and One Greyhounds" | Bob Anderson | Mike Scully | April 9, 1995 | 2F18 | 11.6 |
In a parody of the film One Hundred and One Dalmatians, Santa's Little Helper falls in love with a female greyhound, who eventually gives birth to 25 puppies. The puppies prove troublesome and Homer and Marge decide to give them away. They have several offers, but the puppies do not want to be split up, leading to Mr. Burns stealing the lot. Burns is seemingly caring for the puppies, but reveals that he plans to make a tuxedo out of them, and only keep one. Bart and Lisa sneak in but fail in their attempt to rescue the dogs. As Burns is about to kill the puppies, Bart places the dog Burns wishes to keep with the others, hoping that Burns will not kill them if he can not tell which is which. However, Burns notes that his dog can stand up, but discovers that they all can. Burns has a change of heart and decides not to kill any of the dogs, a decision that pays off handsomely for him as they all become champion racers.
| 124 | 21 | "The PTA Disbands" | Swinton O. Scott III | Jennifer Crittenden | April 16, 1995 | 2F19 | 11.8 |
Edna Krabappel calls a strike to protest against Principal Skinner's low spending on Springfield Elementary School. Bart fuels the strike by repeatedly turning the teachers against Skinner. The parents of Springfield eventually decide to take matters into their own hands, and recruit volunteers from the community to take over as temporary teachers. After several failed substitutes, Marge becomes Bart's teacher. Bart grudgingly decides to resolve the strike, and locks both Krabappel and Skinner in Skinner's office. The experience inspires them to rent out the school cloakrooms to Springfield Prison, in order to earn more money.
| 125 | 22 | "'Round Springfield" | Steven Dean Moore | Story by : Al Jean & Mike Reiss; Teleplay by : Joshua Sternin & Jennifer Ventimilia | April 30, 1995 | 2F32 | 12.6 |
When Bart is rushed to hospital, Lisa meets with Bleeding Gums Murphy in another ward. He lends Lisa his saxophone for her school recital, but when she returns she learns that Bleeding Gums has died. Lisa is the only person who attends his funeral and vows to make sure that everyone in Springfield knows his name. She decides to honor Bleeding Gums' by having his album played on the radio, but cannot afford it. Bart buys it for her, using the $500 he won from suing Krusty. Lightning strikes the station's antenna, projecting the album into every radio in Springfield.
| 126 | 23 | "The Springfield Connection" | Mark Kirkland | Jonathan Collier | May 7, 1995 | 2F21 | 12.7 |
After he cons Homer, Marge chases down Snake, and gets him arrested. Finding the experience exhilarating, Marge enrolls in the police force. After passing the training course, Marge begins fighting crime. Initially Homer finds that being a "cop-husband" is good, but changes his mind when Marge arrests him for illegal parking and stealing her police hat. After he is released, Homer finds a jean-counterfeiting operation in his garage, led by Herman. As the group prepares to kill Homer, Marge saves him. Herman escapes and takes Homer hostage in Bart's treehouse. Marge rescues him again, and Herman falls to the ground and is apprehended. After finding that the rest of the force is corrupt, Marge resigns.
| 127 | 24 | "Lemon of Troy" | Jim Reardon | Brent Forrester | May 14, 1995 | 2F22 | 13.1 |
After Marge teaches him about town pride, Bart becomes embroiled in a fight with a boy from the neighboring town of Shelbyville. The next day, Springfield's lemon tree is stolen by Shelbyville, and Bart leads Milhouse, Nelson, Martin, Todd, and Database to get it back. The group learn that the tree is at an impound lot. Homer uses Flanders' RV to lead the adults to find their kids, and the two groups decide to recover the tree together. Parking the RV in a hospital zone, it is towed to the impound lot, allowing the Springfieldians to rescue the tree, and escape back home.
| 128 | 25 | "Who Shot Mr. Burns? (Part One)" | Jeffrey Lynch | Bill Oakley & Josh Weinstein | May 21, 1995 | 2F16 | 15.0 |
Springfield Elementary School strikes oil, and plans to spend elaborately. Mr. Burns finds out about the oil and establishes a slant drilling operation to take it for himself. As a result, Moe's Tavern is closed, the Springfield Retirement Home collapses, Bart's treehouse is destroyed and Santa's Little Helper is injured, and the school loses all of its money. Burns next decides to build a machine capable of blocking out the sun over Springfield. He fires a recalcitrant Smithers, and Homer vows revenge after Burns repeatedly fails to remember his name. After an emergency town meeting, Burns sets up the sun blocker, believing himself invincible. However, he is shot by an unidentified assailant, and collapses on the town's sundial. Everyone realizes that since Burns angered several people recently, just anyone could have been the assailant. The plot concludes in the seventh season opener "Who Shot Mr. Burns? (Part Two)". Guest star: Tito Puente

== DVD release ==
The Simpsons season 6 DVD digipak, Homer head edition

The DVD boxset for season six was released by 20th Century Fox Home Entertainment in the United States and Canada on August 16, 2005, ten years after it had completed broadcast on television. As well as every episode from the season, the DVD release features bonus material including deleted scenes, Animatics, and commentaries for every episode. The menus follow the same format as the previous season's set.

The box set packaging was changed from the standard box design, used for the previous five seasons, to a plastic clamshell design shaped like Homer's head. After many fans complained of the format change, a standard box was produced, with a "Who Shot Mr. Burns?" theme. The season was not offered for retail sale in North America in the standard box, but people who had bought the head design and preferred the alternative were offered the standard box free of charge. In the United Kingdom, the Homer head packaging was released as a limited edition item, with only 50,000 copies using the design. All other copies used the standard box format. The next four seasons were subsequently released in both a standard and head-shaped packaging in North America, as well as overseas.

The Complete Sixth Season
| Set Details | | | Special Features |
| 25 episodes; 4-disc set; 1.33:1 aspect ratio; AUDIO; English 5.1 Dolby Digital; Spanish 2.0 Dolby Surround; French 2.0 Dolby Surround; SUBTITLES; English SDH; Spanish | | | Optional commentaries for all 25 episodes; Introduction from Matt Groening; Animatics; Illustrated commentaries; Deleted Scenes; Bart of Darkness; Itchy & Scratchy Land; Sideshow Bob Roberts; Treehouse of Horror V; Homer Badman; Grampa vs. Sexual Inadequacy; Fear of Flying; Homer the Great; And Maggie Makes Three; Bart's Comet; Homie the Clown; Bart vs. Australia; Homer vs. Patty and Selma; A Star Is Burns; Lisa's Wedding; Two Dozen and One Greyhounds; The PTA Disbands; 'Round Springfield; The Springfield Connection; Who Shot Mr. Burns? (Part One); Special Language Feature; Who Shot Mr. Burns? (Part One); French (France) 2.0 Dolby Surround; Spanish (Spain) 2.0 Dolby Surround; Czech 2.0 Dolby Surround; Russian 2.0 Dolby Surround; Sketch Gallery - "Who Shot Mr Burns" Suspect Profiles; Commercials; Church's Chicken - Picnic; Church's Chicken - Piggy Bank; 1-800 Collect; TV Special - "Springfield's Most Wanted"; Featurette - The Simpsons Plane; Introduction with James L. Brooks |
Release Dates
| Region 1 | Region 2 | Region 4 | |
| August 16, 2005 | October 17, 2005 | September 28, 2005 | |

== See also ==
- List of The Simpsons episodes
