= Bart's Girlfriend =

- The Simpsons episode
- Jessica Lovejoy giving a sermon at church. Julie Kavner was impressed by the design of her eyes.
- Episode no.: Season 6 Episode 7
- Directed by: Susie Dietter
- Written by: John Collier
- Production code: 2F04
- Original air date: November 6, 1994

Guest appearance
- Meryl Streep as Jessica Lovejoy

Episode features
- Chalkboard gag: "I will not send lard through the mail"
- Couch gag: Five pairs of eyes float in the air, before being reunited with the Simpsons' bodies.
- Commentary: Matt Groening; David Mirkin; Jonathan Collier; Julie Kavner; Susie Dietter; David Silverman

Episode chronology
← Previous "Treehouse of Horror V"	Next → "Lisa on Ice"
- The Simpsons season 6

"Bart's Girlfriend" is the seventh episode of the sixth season of the American animated television series The Simpsons. It originally aired on Fox in the United States on November 6, 1994. The plot of the episode follows the secret romance of Bart and Reverend Lovejoy's daughter Jessica, who makes her debut in this episode. Bart tries to end the romance when he discovers that, behind her innocent façade as a preacher's kid, she is an even bigger troublemaker than he is. Jessica steals the money from the church collection plate, leaving Bart to take the blame until Lisa exposes the truth.

The episode was written by Jonathan Collier and directed by Susie Dietter. Show runner David Mirkin originally came up with the idea of Bart having a girlfriend that was more evil than he was. Meryl Streep guest-stars in the episode as Jessica. It references films such as Planet of the Apes and The Silence of the Lambs. Since airing, the episode has received acclaim from both critics and fans, and Entertainment Weekly named Meryl Streep's role as one of the best guest appearances on The Simpsons.

== Plot ==
During a church sermon, Bart falls in love with Reverend Lovejoy's daughter, Jessica. When he approaches her to praise her sermon, she ignores him. Bart attends Sunday school the next week to convince Jessica that he is a saint, but she still ignores him. Frustrated, Bart plays a prank on Groundskeeper Willie and is punished with detention. Jessica expresses sympathy for Bart and invites him to her house for dinner.

During dinner with the Lovejoys, Bart's crude manner and foul language cause Reverend Lovejoy to forbid him from ever seeing Jessica again. She and Bart secretly date, bonding over their shared love of mischief while vandalizing the town. When Bart realizes that Jessica is more badly behaved than he is, he tries to reform her at the next church service. Undeterred, Jessica empties the money from the collection plate into her purse and abruptly leaves after forcing the empty plate into Bart's lap. The congregation mistakenly believes that Bart took the money when Helen Lovejoy calls their attention to the empty plate.

Homer assumes Bart is guilty, but Marge believes he is innocent. Reluctant to implicate Jessica, Bart visits her the next day and finally comprehends her callous demeanor when she refuses to come forward. Upon learning the truth, Lisa is determined not to allow her brother to be blamed for Jessica's misdeed. After unsuccessfully prompting her to confess, Lisa tells the congregation that Jessica is the guilty party. The townspeople search Jessica's room and find the money hidden under her bed. When Reverend Lovejoy expresses disbelief at her actions, Jessica reminds him of her past misbehavior, which he wilfully ignores. Jessica is ultimately punished by being forced to scrub the church steps, and Bart receives an apology from the congregation.

Later, Bart visits Jessica at church and admits he's matured from having known her. Jessica replies that she's capable of making men do whatever she wants. Bart agrees to finish scrubbing the steps for her as she leaves with her new boyfriend, but he vows to do a poor job to get even with her.

== Production ==
"Bart's Girlfriend" was written by Jonathan Collier and directed by Susie Dietter. David Mirkin, who was show runner at the time, originally had the idea of Bart having a girlfriend that was more evil than he was. Mirkin gave the idea to Collier to write it with the help of the show's executive producer James L. Brooks. Collier said later that he thought it was a case of Brooks coming up with good ideas and him "giggling obsequiously". The idea for the ending of the episode was to have none of the characters learn anything from the experience.

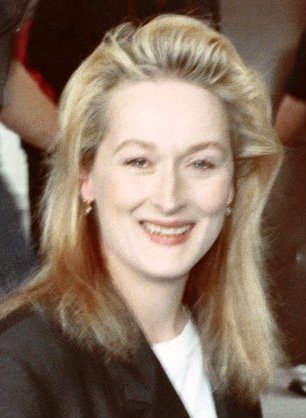
Meryl Streep guest-starred in the episode as Jessica Lovejoy.

Matt Groening, the creator of The Simpsons, felt that Jessica Lovejoy was hard to draw in his own style but at the same time make her attractive. Julie Kavner, the voice of Marge, was particularly impressed by the eyes. Jessica was made the Reverend's daughter to give the impression that she was good at first and then to show that she was rebelling against the righteousness of her family. In the scene where Bart talks to Jessica outside her house, her baton playing was in the script but the exact choreography was not. Dietter liked its incorporation because it gave Jessica something else, other than Bart, to pay attention to. This was also done in the final scene when Jessica scrubs the church steps and plays with the scrub brush.

Academy Award–winning actress Meryl Streep was called in to do the voice of Jessica. Nancy Cartwright, who provides the voice of Bart Simpson on the show, was a huge fan of Streep and she assumed that Streep would record her lines individually, but all of their recordings were done together. Streep showed up alone with no entourage at the Village Recorder in West Los Angeles at 2:30 p.m., where she recorded her parts with Cartwright. Streep was continually doing many different versions of her lines. Mirkin felt she was easy to work with because she was versatile and keen to do a lot of different things, and as Mirkin expressed it, "easily evil". Cartwright said in an interview with The Pantagraph that she really wanted Streep's autograph, but was afraid to ask for it. After the recording session, Streep tapped Cartwright on the shoulder, and said her kids were big Simpsons fans and that she would be in "big trouble" if she did not get Cartwright's autograph.

== Cultural references ==
In the beginning, the parents chase the children in a cornfield to eventually round them up for church, which parodies a similar scene from Planet of the Apes (1968), where the humans are rounded up by apes. As Bart sits in church playing with his Troll Doll, he sings a parodied version of Soul Man (popularised by Sam & Dave). When Homer is musing over Bart's first date, he begins to sing "Sunrise, Sunset" from Fiddler on the Roof, before moving on to "Cat's in the Cradle" and then "Yes, We Have No Bananas". The joke was very expensive; they had to pay thousands of dollars for the rights to use the songs. After Bart is accused of stealing from the church collection plate, he is forced to wear a straitjacket in church, which is a reference to Hannibal Lecter's straitjacket in The Silence of the Lambs. Dick Dale's "Misirlou", the theme of Pulp Fiction (1994), plays during Bart and Jessica's date. Bart calls Jessica "smart, beautiful and a liar..." and then claims she is "...so much better than that Sarah, plain and tall". The scene then cuts to a shot of a plain and tall girl named Sarah that overhears Bart and begins to cry. Bart muses that Jessica is "like a Milk Dud: sweet on the outside, poison on the inside." The Lovejoy family has a replica of Leonardo da Vinci's The Last Supper hanging on the wall in their dining room. The sign on the Springfield Church marquee reads: "Evil Women in History: From Jezebel to Janet Reno". Johann Sebastian Bach's "Jesu, Joy of Man's Desiring" can be heard outside the church; Bart assumes it is being sung by Jessica, but it is actually Ned Flanders, a revelation he calls "disturbing".

== Reception ==
"Bart's Girlfriend" finished 53rd in the ratings for the week of October 31 to November 6, 1994, with a Nielsen rating of 9.6. The episode was the third highest rated show on the Fox network that week, beaten only by Beverly Hills, 90210, and Married... with Children.

Since airing, the episode has received critical acclaim. Gary Russell and Gareth Roberts, the authors of the book I Can't Believe It's a Bigger and Better Updated Unofficial Simpsons Guide, said: "Poor Bart gets picked on very cruelly by Jessica in a cleverly drawn study of pre-pubescent love. We're very fond of the scene in which Bart leaps out of the window at the church, after which Homer cries: He's heading for the window!"

Colin Jacobson at DVD Movie Guide said in a review of the sixth season DVD: "We don’t often see Bart in a sympathetic light, so shows like this one are fun. [The episode] reminds me of season four’s "New Kid on the Block" since it also featured Bart in love, though the programs differ since here the girl reciprocates. Streep does nicely as the bad kid and we get many fine moments in this memorable program." TV Squad's Adam Finley said: "Homer and Marge remained in the background for most of this episode, with Bart and Lisa becoming the main focus. Earlier episodes seemed to focus more on the dynamics between the two siblings, and it's always a nice change of pace when the show examines their love for one another as opposed to constant rivalries. Lisa really wants to help Bart in this episode, and it's actually quite touching."

In 2008, Entertainment Weekly named Meryl Streep's role as Jessica Lovejoy as one of the sixteen best guest appearances on The Simpsons. Total Film's Nathan Ditum ranked Streep's performance as the fifth best guest appearance in the show's history, commenting that she is "the perfect mix of beguiling and devilish as Reverend Lovejoy’s rebellious daughter".

David Mirkin told the Daily News of Los Angeles that "Bart's Girlfriend" and "Homer the Great" are his favorite episodes of the season. Mirkin liked the scene where Bart is punched by Nelson at the playground because Bart takes a while to recover, which made the scene more realistic. In 1995, Nancy Cartwright told the Chicago Tribune that this episode, and "Lisa's Substitute" from season two, are her two favorite The Simpsons episodes.

Erik Adams writes "He’s got a thing for the preacher’s daughter, and he’s got it bad, an emotional state brilliantly illustrated by the gauntlet the episode stages for its protagonist. He’s a patsy for her, he risks serious cranial injury for her, he even takes one of Nelson’s fists to the gut for his playground love. (Cue one of the bully’s weirdly chivalrous one-liners: 'That’s for besmirching an innocent girl’s name!') It’s in touches like this that 'Bart’s Girlfriend' bests the similarly themed 'New Kid On The Block'—in that episode, Bart’s feelings are treated as an afterthought, only coming into play as the motivation for his plot against Jimbo Jones. This week’s Simpsons installment doesn’t just symbolically tear Bart’s heart out—it smears his guts all over the screen in ways comedic and poignant. This is a personal, heartfelt story, and Jonathan Collier’s script treats it as such, maintaining an intimate, Bart-and-Jessica-centric focus until momentum dictates the inclusion of Springfield at large. Once the townspeople are involved, the story loses some of its power, but the focus returns to the ill-suited lovebirds as the end credits prepare to roll—eventually narrowing to capture just Bart, alone on the church steps, no lessons learned or morals gleaned." He notes "Another great one-liner from Nelson, responding to his violation of cowboys-and-Indians’ historical accuracy: 'Hey, records from that era are spotty—at best.' The bully’s definitely having trouble keeping his sensitivity and latent interest in book-learning in check this week."
