= And Maggie Makes Three =

- The Simpsons episode
- Episode no.: Season 6 Episode 13
- Directed by: Swinton O. Scott III
- Written by: Jennifer Crittenden
- Production code: 2F10
- Original air date: January 22, 1995

Episode features
- Chalkboard gag: "'Bagman' is not a legitimate career choice"
- Couch gag: Homer reenacts the James Bond gun barrel sequence.
- Commentary: Matt Groening; David Mirkin; Swinton O. Scott III; David Silverman

Episode chronology
← Previous "Homer the Great"	Next → "Bart's Comet"
- The Simpsons season 6

"And Maggie Makes Three" is the thirteenth episode of the sixth season of the American animated television series The Simpsons. It originally aired on Fox in the United States on January 22, 1995. In the episode, Homer recounts the story of Maggie's birth when Bart and Lisa ask why there are no photos of her in the family album.

The episode was written by Jennifer Crittenden and directed by Swinton O. Scott III. This was both Crittenden and Scott's first episode on The Simpsons. It features cultural references to television series such as The Mary Tyler Moore Show and Knight Rider. Since airing, the episode has received universal acclaim from fans and television critics. It acquired a Nielsen rating of 10.3, and was the fourth highest rated show on the Fox network the week it aired.

== Plot ==
While browsing through the family photo album, Lisa notices it contains no baby pictures of Maggie. Homer explains why by recounting the story of Maggie's birth: in 1993, Homer hated his job at the Springfield Nuclear Power Plant and dreamed of working at a bowling alley, and thus quit after receiving a paycheck clearing him of all his debts, humiliating Mr. Burns and literally burning a bridge during his departure. Homer subsequently obtained a job at a bowling alley owned by Barney's uncle, Al.

After Homer and Marge had sexual intercourse to celebrate his new job, she became pregnant. Marge made Patty and Selma promise not to tell Homer, though they did not heed this advice, informing various citizens of Springfield, who were all aware of Marge's pregnancy the following day. Despite this, Homer remained oblivious to the news, even when Moe directly congratulated him. Homer returned home, where Marge's friends had thrown her a baby shower, though he remained oblivious. When Maude casually congratulated Homer on his new job, Homer suddenly realized Marge was pregnant, upsetting him, as his salary at the bowling alley would not be enough to raise more than two children.

Marge urged Homer to ask Al for a raise, though Al explained the alley's profits prevented him from offering one unless Homer could find a way to increase business threefold. Homer tried to attract more customers by firing a shotgun outside the bowling alley, which only caused a massive panic and large police response - a series of events so absurd, Lisa asks Homer to tell the story right, until Marge, ashamed, confirms its veracity. Unable to drum up business, Homer quit his dream job and returned to the power plant. Mr. Burns forced Homer to beg for his job back and placed a large plaque near his desk which read: "Don't forget: you're here forever". Homer returned home depressed to find Marge's contractions had begun and took her to the hospital. His spirits were lifted when he saw Maggie for the first time and instantly fell in love with her.

Back in the present, Bart and Lisa still do not understand what this story has to do with Maggie's missing baby pictures, though Homer claims the photos are safe in a location where he "needs the most cheering up". It is subsequently revealed that Homer has taped the photos to the aforementioned plaque: covering portions so that the plaque now reads "Do it for her."

== Production ==
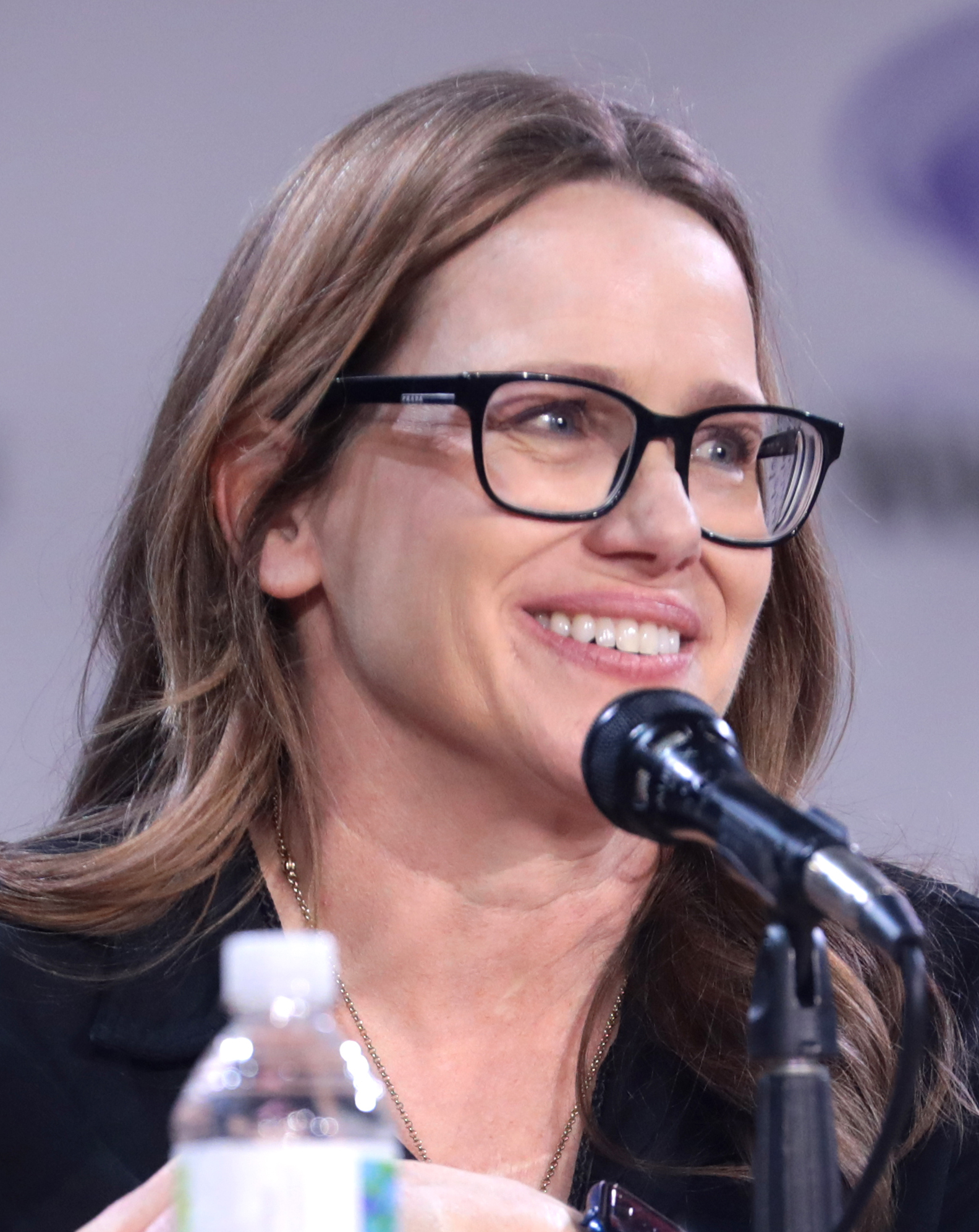
This was the first Simpsons episode written by Jennifer Crittenden, who was then 23

The episode was written by Jennifer Crittenden, and directed by Swinton O. Scott III. This was the first episode Scott directed for the show. Crittenden also made her debut as a writer for The Simpsons in this episode. Crittenden was taking a beginners' writing program at 20th Century Fox when The Simpsons showrunner David Mirkin hired her on the show. Crittenden's only writing experience before that had been as an intern on the Late Show with David Letterman. 20th Century Fox introduced Crittenden to Mirkin, and Mirkin read a script of hers that he liked. When Mirkin first talked to Crittenden, he thought she was a really nice woman who was very mature. Crittenden was only 23 years old at the time, but Mirkin liked her, and he hired her.

After Homer quits his job at the power plant, he violently tosses his old boss Mr. Burns out of the cart he is driving. Homer then drives across a wooden bridge and tosses a match onto it; the whole bridge is instantly engulfed in flames. Mirkin came up with the joke, and said that "the thing with animation is that you can stage almost anything and time it perfectly, something you would not be able to do in live action". As a live-action director, Mirkin said he enjoys the amount of control they have in animation.

In the episode, Mr. Burns places a "de-motivational plaque" in Homer's station that reads "Don't forget: you're here forever". Homer then places photos of Maggie around the plaque to alter it into saying "Do it for her". The Simpsons writer George Meyer, who enjoys writing jokes that involve anagrams or any other forms of word play, came up with the idea for this particular joke. The joke is also an homage to Al Jaffee's Fold-in features in the Mad magazine.

On September 4, 2018, 23 years after the episode's original broadcast, Simpsons producer Matt Selman posted a tweet saying that he had noticed a continuity error in the episode: when Marge announces to Homer that she is pregnant with Maggie, a photo of the baby can be seen in the background.

== Cultural references ==
The couch gag is a reference to the famous James Bond gun barrel sequence. Dr. Hibbert's flashback hairstyle is modeled after Arsenio Hall's. The family watches Knight Boat, a parody of Knight Rider. Homer spinning around with a bowling ball in his hand before throwing it into the air and exclaiming "I'm gonna make it after all" is reminiscent of the opening of The Mary Tyler Moore Show where Mary throws her hat into the air. The Mary Tyler Moore Show was one of the earlier shows that James L. Brooks worked on. Raymond Scott's "Powerhouse" plays during the pin-setting scene. Jacques from "Life on the Fast Lane" can be seen at the bowling alley.

== Continuity mistakes ==
Although the episode shows Maggie's origin, several plot errors are made that contradict previous episodes. Among those mistakes are:

- In one scene set in the Simpsons' living room, a picture with Maggie's face is seen on the wall. Maggie had not yet been born, although it is believed that it is possibly a photo of Lisa as a baby.
- The appearance of Ruth Powers welcoming Marge with the other Springfield women. Ruth's debut took place in the episode "New Kid on the Block", which is supposed to take place after this episode in-universe.
- Marge's announcement to Homer of her pregnancies at the current Simpson residence. Homer was living with Barney at the time of Marge's pregnancy in the episode "I Married Marge".
- In the episode "Lisa's First Word", Homer, Marge, and Bart lived in an apartment in the suburbs of Springfield, and that is when Homer really finds out about Lisa's pregnancy. In both pregnancies, Homer is happy, not shocked, and keeps his hair. Lisa's arrival in the family is what really forced Homer and Marge to look for a larger house for everyone, and that is when they find and move into the Evergreen Terrace residence.
- In "Homer's Barbershop Quartet", "Homer Defined" and "Brother, Can You Spare Two Dimes?", Homer keeps his hair once more.
- In "Marge on the Lam", it is suggested Homer lost his hair through experimental drugs, not tearing it out.
- Homer got his regular job as a safety inspector in the episode "Homer's Odyssey", when Maggie had already been born.

== Reception ==
In its original broadcast, "And Maggie Makes Three" finished 47th in the ratings for the week of January 16 to January 22, 1995, with a Nielsen rating of 10.3. The episode was the fourth-highest rated show on the Fox network that week, beaten only by Melrose Place, Beverly Hills, 90210, and the Rock 'n' Roll Skating Championship.

The final scene is often regarded as one of the most heart-warming moments in the show's history.

Since airing, the episode has received universal acclaim from fans and television critics. Comedian and one-time Simpsons writer Ricky Gervais named it his second favorite episode, and said: "Mr. Burns gives [Homer] this terrible plaque above his desk that says, 'Don't forget: You're here forever.' It's about how sometimes things don't go the way you planned, which is pretty amazing in a cartoon. Homer then puts up all the pictures of Maggie he's ever taken to strategically cover this horrible thing so it now reads, 'Do it for her.' It gives me a lump in the throat thinking about it." Gary Russell and Gareth Roberts, the authors of the book I Can't Believe It's a Bigger and Better Updated Unofficial Simpsons Guide, said: "A surprisingly traditional episode. The flashback to 1993 seems a bit odd, but this is a good example of a story that doesn't overly rely on set pieces and confounded expectations for its success." In a review of the sixth season, Joshua Klein of the Chicago Tribune cited "And Maggie Makes Three", "Treehouse of Horror V", "Homer Badman", and "Lisa's Rival" among his favorite episodes of the season.

TV Squad's Adam Finley said the episode "manages to be both incredibly funny and incredibly touching, both signs of a great Simpsons episode". He added that "the episode has some great gags in it, but the emotion is very real, too. Homer is not thrilled with the idea of having a baby, and the episode does a wonderful job of showing the dark side of having another mouth to feed." Colin Jacobson at DVD Movie Guide said in a review of the sixth season DVD: "Flashback episodes of The Simpsons usually work well, and [this episode] is no exception to that rule. Actually, at this point it’s one of my favorites, but that's partially because of overexposure to some of the other episodes. In any case, this one has many hilarious moments – such as the scene that explains Homer's hair loss." Kevin Wong at PopMatters said the episode is "a touching look at fatherhood".

A 2017 Dissent review of Melinda Cooper's Family Values begins by summarizing the episode, citing the scene in which Homer returns to his old job as "a gut-wrenching reminder of the affective logic of modern capitalism", and contextualizing it with respect to the themes of familialism and the cost of raising a child that Cooper discusses.
