= Bart's Comet =

- The Simpsons episode
- Episode no.: Season 6 Episode 14
- Directed by: Bob Anderson
- Written by: John Swartzwelder
- Production code: 2F11
- Original air date: February 5, 1995

Episode features
- Chalkboard gag: "Cursive writing does not mean what I think it does"
- Couch gag: The Simpsons are animated in the style of Fleischer Studios.
- Commentary: Matt Groening; David Mirkin; Dan Castellaneta; Yeardley Smith; Bob Anderson

Episode chronology
← Previous "And Maggie Makes Three"	Next → "Homie the Clown"
- The Simpsons season 6

"Bart's Comet" is the fourteenth episode of the sixth season of the American animated television series The Simpsons. It originally aired on Fox in the United States on February 5, 1995. In the episode, Bart Simpson accidentally discovers a comet, which is heading towards Springfield. The show's writing staff saw an issue of Time magazine that presented the threat of comets hitting Earth on its cover, and so decided to create an episode in a similar vein. "Bart's Comet" contains references to Where's Waldo? and The Twilight Zone, and received positive reviews.

The episode was written by John Swartzwelder and directed by Bob Anderson.

== Plot ==
After Bart sabotages Principal Skinner's weather balloon, Skinner punishes him by making him arrive in the schoolyard at 4:30 a.m. to be his amateur astronomy assistant. Whilst Skinner is distracted by retrieving the weather balloon, Bart accidentally locates a comet, which scientists soon discover is headed straight for Springfield. Professor Frink plans to launch a missile at the comet, exploding it before it touches the ground. Instead, the missile undershoots the comet and destroys the only bridge out of town. An evacuation of the town is voted down in Congress due to the addition of a poison pill amendment to the enabling legislation.

Homer decides his family should stay in Ned Flanders's bomb shelter; anticipating this scenario, Ned has constructed a shelter large enough for several people. Other townspeople soon arrive, crowding the shelter until Homer is unable to close the door. Because everyone else thinks they deserve to live, Ned is expelled from his own shelter.

Eventually, Homer feels guilty and leaves the shelter, followed by the other townspeople. Everyone joins Ned on a hill, joining in with his singing while awaiting death from the comet. As it enters the Earth's atmosphere, the comet burns up in the thick layer of pollution over Springfield. When it touches down, all that remains is a meteorite the size of a Chihuahua's head. Only the shelter and the weather balloon are destroyed, leaving the rest of the town untouched. The townspeople band together to burn down the observatory so "it will never happen again". With Homer having accurately predicted the comet's fate earlier, he, Bart and Lisa huddle together in fear.

== Production ==
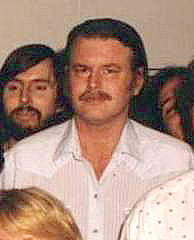
John Swartzwelder wrote the episode.

The episode was written by John Swartzwelder and directed by Bob Anderson. After seeing an issue of Time magazine which presented the threat of comets hitting Earth on its cover the writing staff decided to have an episode based on the concept of a comet hitting Springfield. They fleshed out the episode's plot over several days and Swartzwelder then set about writing the details of the script. According to showrunner David Mirkin, examples of "Swartzwelder humor" in the episode include the American fighter pilots mistaking Groundskeeper Willie for an Iraqi jet and cutting to Grampa and Jasper outside a 1940s general store. For the bomb shelter scene, the mass of townspeople was constructed on multiple layers so that it was easier to animate.

Kent Brockman's list of gay people is composed of the show's production staff, who had to sign legal agreements that they would not sue their own show. As a result, according to show creator Matt Groening, many of the staff appear on lists of gay people on the Internet. The episode marks the first appearance of Database, a character Groening dislikes if he is used for anything more than one line.

Mirkin considers the episode to be one of his all-time favorites, calling it a "perfect Simpsons episode" due to the size of the plot, emotion and observational humor.

== Cultural references ==
David Mirkin put Waldo in the top-left of the frame.

- The couch gag is a reference to the animation of Fleischer Studios.
- Principal Skinner curses Pierre Jules César Janssen
- The constellation of the Three Wise Men is a drawing of The Three Stooges.
- Principal Skinner refers to the Comet Kohoutek.
- The townspeople yanking their collars after the rocket destroys the only bridge out of town is a reference to Charles Nelson Reilly's performance in The Ghost & Mrs. Muir.
- Waldo from Where's Waldo? appears near the top-left of a frame during the first group shot in the bomb shelter, imitating the style of the Where's Waldo? books.
- The bomb shelter scenes were based on The Twilight Zone episodes "The Shelter" and "The Monsters Are Due on Maple Street".
- The episode makes references to Back to the Future, including when Professor Frink accidentally sets his town model on fire, just like Doc Brown.
- The Super Friends are named after the 1970s cartoon of the same name.
- As the comet approaches Springfield, the townspeople sing "Que Sera Sera", a song originally recorded by Doris Day for Alfred Hitchcock's 1956 film The Man Who Knew Too Much.

== Reception ==
=== Critical reception ===
Gary Russell and Gareth Roberts, the authors of the book I Can't Believe It's a Bigger and Better Updated Unofficial Simpsons Guide, called it an "excellent episode" and praised the "great moment when the ever-pious Maude Flanders happily sacrifices her Neddy".

Mikey Cahill of the Herald Sun picked the episode's chalkboard gag, "Cursive writing does not mean what I think it does", as one of his favorite chalkboard gags in the history of the show.

Colin Jacobson of DVD Movie Guide said in a review of the sixth season DVD that he did not "share the same level of enthusiasm for it" as Mirkin, concluding: "I think it provides a consistently strong show. It stretches reality a bit, but that’s not a problem–or unusual for the series–and the program ends up as a positive one."

Ryan Keefer of DVD Verdict gave the episode a B−.

TV critics Matt Zoller Seitz and Alan Sepinwall cited the episode as how The Simpsons "always had the culture and the species on its mind even when it was clowning around", pointing to the moment near the end of the episode when the camera slowly pans across the Springfieldians' faces in the bomb shelter while Ned Flanders sings "Que Sera Sera": "a moment of existential terror that gives way to graceful resignation."

In the July 26, 2007 issue of Nature, the scientific journal's editorial staff listed "Bart's Comet" among "The Top Ten science moments in The Simpsons".

=== Ratings ===
In its original broadcast, "Bart's Comet" finished joint 33rd (with The X-Files and Hangin' with Mr. Cooper) in the ratings for the week of January 3 to February 5, 1995, with a Nielsen rating of 11.3. It was the fourth highest rated show on the Fox network that week.
