= Homer vs. Patty and Selma =

- The Simpsons episode
- Marge finding out about Homer's debt to Patty and Selma
- Episode no.: Season 6 Episode 17
- Directed by: Mark Kirkland
- Written by: Brent Forrester
- Production code: 2F14
- Original air date: February 26, 1995

Guest appearances
- Mel Brooks as himself; Susan Sarandon as Ballet Teacher

Episode features
- Chalkboard gag: "I will remember to take my medication"
- Couch gag: The family is beamed onto the couch the same way the characters are in Quantum Leap.
- Commentary: Matt Groening; David Mirkin; Mark Kirkland; David Silverman

Episode chronology
| ← Previous "Bart vs. Australia" | Next → "A Star Is Burns" |
- The Simpsons season 6

"Homer vs. Patty and Selma" is the seventeenth episode of the sixth season of the American animated television series The Simpsons. It originally aired on Fox in the United States on February 26, 1995. In the episode, Homer loses all his money in pumpkin futures and must turn to Patty and Selma for a loan. Meanwhile, Bart takes up ballet lessons, with an instructor voiced by actress Susan Sarandon.

The episode was written by Brent Forrester and directed by Mark Kirkland, with David Mirkin serving as the executive producer. Sarandon had wanted to guest-star on The Simpsons because her children were fans of the show; she made a later appearance in the series in the episode "Bart Has Two Mommies" as the voice of a computer. Mel Brooks also makes an appearance in "Homer vs. Patty and Selma", and had previously accompanied his wife Anne Bancroft to the recording studio when she had a role in the episode "Fear of Flying".

Chris Turner cites scenes from the episode in describing Homer's characteristic qualities in his book Planet Simpson: How a Cartoon Masterpiece Documented an Era and Defined a Generation. Turner notes that the episode illustrates Homer's impulsiveness, silliness, and "physical stupidity". Contributor Raja Halwani writes in the compilation work The Simpsons and Philosophy that the episode shows Homer's tendency to habitually lie to Marge, and cites Homer's covering for Patty and Selma when they are caught smoking as a positive aspect of his character. The episode also received positive mention from Turner in Planet Simpson, Gary Russell and Gareth Roberts in their book I Can't Believe It's a Bigger and Better Updated Unofficial Simpsons Guide, and Colin Jacobson of DVD Movie Guide.

== Plot ==
Noticing sales have been going up, Homer invests in pumpkins. Not realizing it's Halloween, he sells his futures too late and loses his entire investment. Now unable to make mortgage payments and unable to borrow money from the bank, Homer realizes his last resort is to ask Patty and Selma for money after they receive promotions at the DMV. The sisters agree to lend him money on the condition that he becomes their humble servant. The sisters take pleasure in making Homer's life miserable, while Homer begs Patty and Selma to help conceal his money woes from Marge, who soon finds out after seeing his IOU note to her sisters.

To earn more money Homer becomes a chauffeur, where his first passenger is Mel Brooks. Homer asks Brooks if he would do the 2000 Year Old Man routine with him. Brooks agrees, but Homer completely butchers the premise. Soon afterwards, he is stopped by Chief Wiggum for not having the proper license. Brooks then asks Wiggum if he can take him the rest of the way to the airport, Wiggum agrees and then ask Brooks if they can do the 2000 Year Old Man routine on the way. Brooks agrees, but only on the condition that Wiggum does Carl Reiner's part, saying that he hates Reiner. Homer goes to the DMV to obtain one, but is horrified to discover his evaluators will be Patty and Selma, who mercilessly fail his driving and written test. To celebrate Homer's failure, they light up cigarettes but are caught by their supervisor, who threatens to demote them for smoking on the job. After seeing Marge's dismay at the situation, Homer reluctantly covers for them by claiming the lit cigarettes are his. The supervisor apologises to Patty and Selma and then slaps Homer, saying that he is "worse than Hitler". To thank Homer for helping them avoid demotion, Patty and Selma offer to let him pass his test, but instead Homer eagerly asks them to forgive the loan.

In the subplot, Bart is late for school on the day students choose their physical education classes. When he arrives, ballet is the only class that is available. Despite his initial reluctance, Bart soon discovers he is a talented dancer and is invited to star in a school ballet. Bart insists on wearing a mask to conceal his identity, fearful that he will be taunted and beaten up; however, he manages to put on a performance that delights the audience. After his performance, Bart reveals his identity and despite his confidence in his performance, the school bullies chase Bart anyway, intending to beat him. He tries to escape by jumping over a trench but injures himself after failing the leap. Seeing that Bart is hurt from the fall, the bullies leave without pummeling him. Lisa tells Bart she is proud of him for showing his sensitive side.

== Production ==
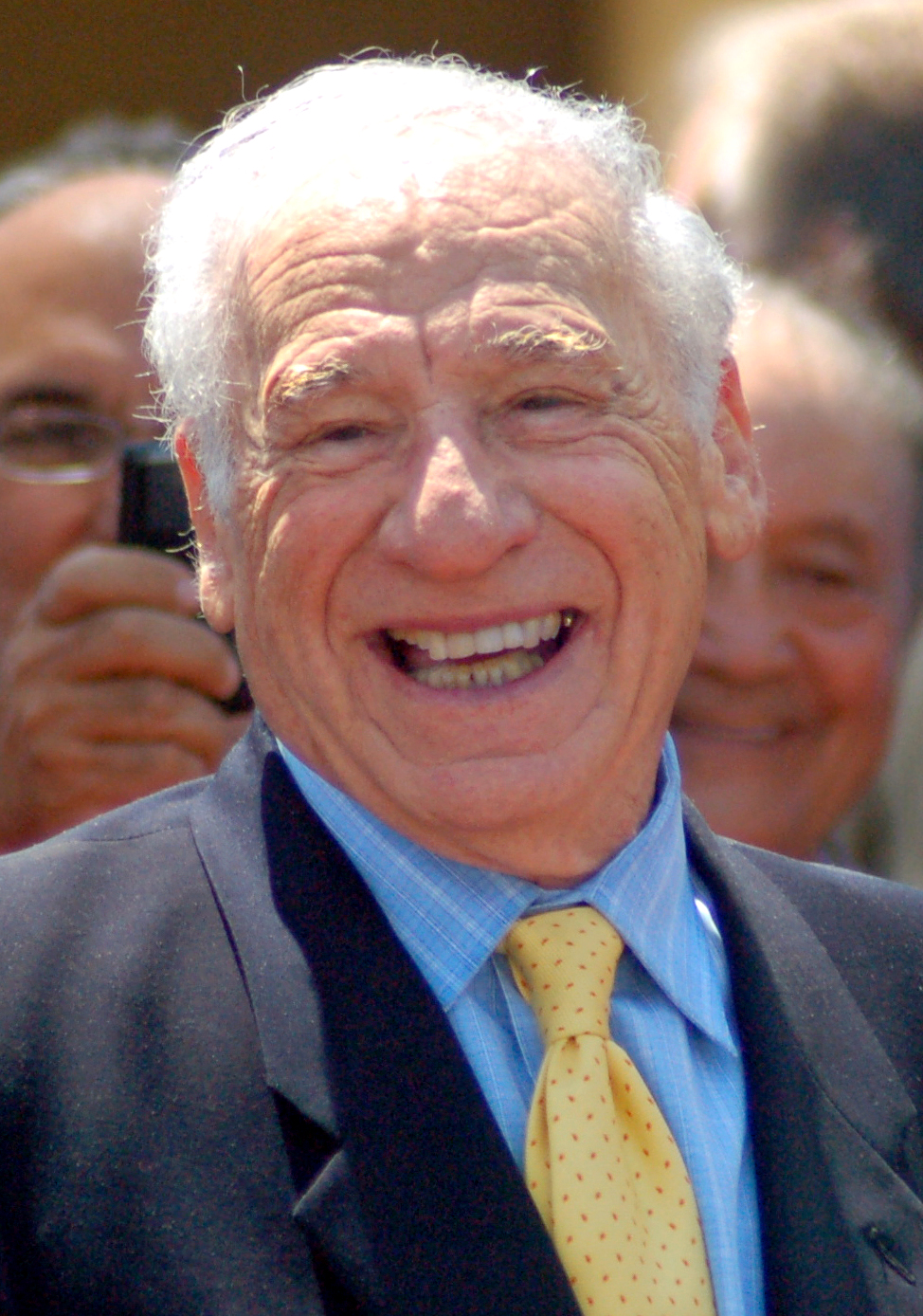
Mel Brooks has a cameo appearance in the episode.

The script for "Homer vs. Patty and Selma" was written by Brent Forrester and was the first time he received a writing credit on The Simpsons. Executive producer David Mirkin describes it as a very grounded and emotional episode that seems very "sitcomy".

Bart's ballet teacher was voiced by Susan Sarandon, and was designed to look a little bit like her. Sarandon had wanted to guest star on the show because her children were big fans; she brought them with her to the recording session. Due to a traffic jam, she was late for the recording session, but once she arrived, she fell into character and worked very hard on getting her accent accurate. Sarandon would later have a cameo appearance as the voice of a computer in the season 17 episode "Bart Has Two Mommies". Mel Brooks has a cameo appearance as himself. His wife Anne Bancroft had played a role in the episode "Fear of Flying" and Brooks had accompanied her to the recording session. Mirkin realized that Brooks was "dying to do the show" and asked him if he would be willing to do a guest part, which he agreed. Many of the writers were fans of Brooks and Matt Groening described the chance to have him guest star as "an incredible honor".

The episode was directed by Mark Kirkland, who was a fan of Patty and Selma, having previously directed the season two episode "Principal Charming", which also focuses on the duo. When directing the sequences where Bart does ballet dancing, Kirkland assigned the scenes to animators who were familiar with dancing.

== Cultural references ==
Bart's ballet teacher says he could be the next Baryshnikov. Watching his performance, Jimbo says, "I haven't been this moved since The Joy Luck Club." Homer tells Mel Brooks, "I loved that movie Young Frankenstein! Scared the Hell out of me." Brooks seems unsettled.

To amuse himself after Milhouse runs to get to school, Bart repeats "S'all right? S' all Right!". This is a reference to the song "S-All Right? S-All Right" by Senor Wences.

== Themes ==
Chris Turner writes in his book Planet Simpson: How a Cartoon Masterpiece Documented an Era and Defined a Generation that the episode illustrates how Homer Simpson is "an organism of considerable complexity". Turner comments, "Homer is carrying the full symbolic weight of twentieth-century America on his shoulders, and no garden-variety doofus could manage that task." Turner discusses a moment from the episode where Marge tells her sisters, "Homer doesn't mean to be rude, he's just a very complicated man", after which Homer breaks a plate over his head and shouts "Wrong!" Turner writes that this "revelatory moment" is illustrative of "several of the best-known aspects of Homer's character: his impulsiveness, his inherent silliness, his evident, even physical stupidity".

In the compilation work The Simpsons and Philosophy: The D'oh! of Homer, edited by William Irwin, Mark T. Conrad, and Aeon J. Skoble, the episode is cited as an example where, as contributor Raja Halwani writes, "Homer is a habitual liar, he lacks honesty." In addition to "lying about his financial losses in investments" in the episode, Halwani notes Homer lied to Marge in "The Front" about "the fact that he never graduated from high school", and in the episode "The Cartridge Family", Homer lied to Marge about getting rid of the gun he had purchased. However, Halwani later highlights positive aspects of Homer's character, noting that in the episode, Homer "pretended he was the one smoking so that Patty and Selma would not get fired for smoking at their workplace".

== Reception ==
=== Critical reception ===
Chris Turner wrote in Planet Simpson that the scene where Homer "smashes a dinner plate over his head" is one of his favorite Homer moments. "I'd like to say it's the defining Homer moment, but that would do a grave injustice to the extraordinary dramatic achievement that is Homer J. Simpson", Turner comments.

In the I Can't Believe It's a Bigger and Better Updated Unofficial Simpsons Guide, Gary Russell and Gareth Roberts writes, "Patty and Selma have rarely been more evil than here — they are fabulously cruel."

In a review of the sixth season of The Simpsons, Colin Jacobson of DVD Movie Guide writes, "Homer’s disdain for Marge’s sisters – and vice versa – has always led to terrific sparks, and “Vs.” provides another great round in their eternal battle. It's hilarious to see Homer indebted to the Terrible Two..."

Erik Adams writes "It’s that finale in the DMV that marks 'Homer Vs. Patty And Selma' as a product of The Simpsons’ golden years. Provided with the opportunity to let his sisters-in-law hang themselves with their own high-tar nooses, Homer does the noble thing and claims Patty and Selma’s contraband cigarettes as his own. ... It’s a little late in the game, but it’s just the right turn for the episode to take: Homer reaches for the cigarettes not to have the debt erased or to pass his chauffeur’s test, but to illustrate the lengths he’ll go to for Marge. If there’s one crowning achievement of Forrester’s first Simpsons script, it’s the way the episode laces Homer’s devotion to Marge throughout the scattered events of the episode. ... That Homer’s trip to flavor country is an illustration of why Marge reciprocates that devotion is just gravy. She was born a Bouvier, but she chose to be a Simpson, and in the eternal struggle summed up in this episode’s title, she’ll throw her lot in with the Simpson side each and every time. It’s a much safer bet than pumpkin futures, at least."

=== Ratings ===
In its original broadcast, "Homer vs. Patty and Selma" finished 38th in ratings for the week of February 20–26, 1995, with a Nielsen rating of 11.1, equivalent to approximately 10.6 million viewing households. It was the third-highest-rated show on the Fox network that week, following Beverly Hills, 90210 and Married... with Children.

== Legacy ==
The "Ratboy" scene inspired a popular internet meme in Latin America.

In Latin America, the figure and concept of "Niño Rata", the Spanish equivalent of "Ratboy" (the nickname Homer ascribes to Bart in a scene in this episode) in the Spanish-language version as dubbed by Humberto Vélez, slowly became an Internet meme, particularly on YouTube. The phrase is now popularized as a colloquial means of describing irate, inexperienced and underage fans of video games such as Minecraft, Call of Duty, FIFA, Grand Theft Auto Online and Fortnite; it is also used to designate YouTube users who troll other users in the comments bar. It is roughly analogous to the English phrase "squeaker".
