= Fear of Flying (The Simpsons) =

- The Simpsons episode
- Episode no.: Season 6 Episode 11
- Directed by: Mark Kirkland
- Written by: David Sacks
- Production code: 2F08
- Original air date: December 18, 1994

Guest appearances
- Anne Bancroft as Dr. Zweig; Ted Danson as Sam Malone; Woody Harrelson as Woody Boyd; Rhea Perlman as Carla Tortelli; John Ratzenberger as Cliff Clavin; George Wendt as Norm Peterson

Episode features
- Chalkboard gag: "Ralph won't "morph" if you squeeze him hard enough"
- Couch gag: The Simpsons join a kickline as the living room turns into a circus extravaganza.
- Commentary: Matt Groening; David Mirkin; Mark Kirkland

Episode chronology
← Previous "Grampa vs. Sexual Inadequacy"	Next → "Homer the Great"
- The Simpsons season 6

"Fear of Flying" is the eleventh episode of the sixth season of the American animated television series The Simpsons. It was first broadcast on the Fox network in the United States on December 18, 1994. In the episode, the Simpson family prepares to go on a vacation by plane, but the circumstances force Marge to confess that she has a fear of flying, which she then sees a therapist to uncover the root cause of.

The episode was written by David Sacks and directed by Mark Kirkland. It features Anne Bancroft as Dr. Zweig. Additionally, Ted Danson, Woody Harrelson, Rhea Perlman, John Ratzenberger, and George Wendt appear as their characters from Cheers, reprising their roles from the show.

"Fear of Flying" was well received by television critics, and acquired a Nielsen rating of 9.6. The authors of the book I Can't Believe It's a Bigger and Better Updated Unofficial Simpsons Guide commented positively on the episode, as did reviews from DVD Verdict and DVD Movie Guide.

== Plot ==
The patrons of Moe's Tavern pull a series of dangerous pranks on Moe. Homer joins in with a harmless prank, which enrages everyone else in the bar. Moe bans Homer from ever patronizing the bar again. Homer patronizes several other bars, but none of them are suitable. Only airline pilots are allowed to patronize the last bar of Homer's search, so Homer pretends to be a pilot in order to drink there. However, he gets mistaken for an actual pilot, which leads him to be put in charge of a flight to Chicago (despite his persistent confession that he's not an actual pilot) and he promptly wrecks the plane. In exchange for Homer's silence about the incident, the airline gives the Simpson family free tickets for a flight to any of the lower forty-eight states.

While Homer, Bart, and Lisa are excited to travel, Marge makes several failed attempts to avoid the trip. As their plane is about to take off, she reveals to Homer she has a fear of flying. She proceeds to have a panic attack and demands to be let off the plane. Marge, Homer, Lisa, Bart, and Maggie exit the plane, but Grampa is left behind. Marge insists she is mentally healthy, but her suppression of her fear causes her behavior to become increasingly erratic and she shows signs of lingering flight-related trauma. Lisa convinces Marge to undergo psychotherapy.

Homer, who doesn't believe in therapy, vehemently opposes Lisa's idea; he fears that any therapist Marge sees will identify him as a problem and convince Marge to leave him, which will destroy the family. Marge's therapist, Dr. Zweig, uncovers a key memory in Marge's life: the moment she discovered her father was a flight attendant, even though he had told her he was a pilot. Marge's shame is eased when Zweig assures her that male flight attendants are now very common, and that her father could be considered a pioneer. Marge also recalls that she was injured as a baby when her grandmother fed her while saying "Here comes the airplane", a toy plane she played with as a child once spontaneously burst into flames, and she and her mother were almost bombarded with gunfire by a crop dusting biplane in a cornfield. Marge realizes all of these incidents led her to avoid planes, and she stops going to therapy, despite Dr. Zweig's insistence that Marge continue therapy to work out her trauma regarding her marriage to Homer.

Feeling she has finally conquered her fear, Marge decides to travel on a plane, and Homer joins her. As the plane leaves the runway, Homer offers Marge reassurance that everything that is happening is normal; however, the plane's engines fail and it skids off the runway and into a body of water, in which Homer insists that it is completely normal, much to Marge's annoyance.

== Production ==
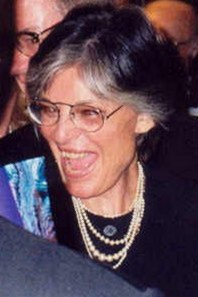
Anne Bancroft guest starred as Dr. Zweig.

"Fear of Flying" was directed by Mark Kirkland and written by David Sacks. The story came about when Sacks came into the writers' room with an idea for an episode where Marge goes to a therapist "for one reason or another". Sacks and the other writers then structured the rest of the plot around that. Anne Bancroft was called in to voice Zweig. Before Bancroft recorded her part, the animators based Zweig's design on a temp track from cast member Tress MacNeille as the therapist. After Bancroft had recorded her part, Zweig was redesigned to fit with Bancroft's voice. They added split glasses and a streak of silver in her hair to give her a more mature look. Bancroft's husband Mel Brooks followed her to the studio, with Bancroft telling show runner David Mirkin "I can't get rid of him." Brooks, who also sat next to Mirkin when Bancroft played her role and also sought to advise Mirkin, would go on to guest star the same season in "Homer vs. Patty and Selma".

The staff were able to get the central cast of the American sitcom Cheers, with the exception of Kelsey Grammer, Shelley Long, and Kirstie Alley, to reunite and guest star in the episode. The staff could not arrange the script to allow time in the episode for Grammer, who already had a recurring role on The Simpsons as Sideshow Bob, to voice Frasier Crane (although Crane does have a non-speaking cameo in the episode). Ted Danson guest starred as Sam, Woody Harrelson as Woody, Rhea Perlman as Carla, John Ratzenberger as Cliff, and George Wendt as Norm.

Due to the episode running short in length, it features the long title sequence that ends with various characters performing a dance routine for the couch gag.

== Cultural references ==
Homer enters the Cheers bar in a scene which is a parody of a typical episode of Cheers. All of the speaking characters are voiced by the actors who played them on Cheers, though Frasier Crane remains silent despite being played by The Simpsons veteran Kelsey Grammer, the voice of Sideshow Bob. Marge's dream sees her in the role of Maureen Robinson from Lost in Space, with Homer playing Dr. Zachary Smith and Lisa playing the Robot. The scene where Marge and Jacqueline Bouvier run away when a biplane shoots at them in a cornfield is a parody of Alfred Hitchcock's North by Northwest. Homer's Mount Lushmore caricature resembles Eustace Tilley, the mascot of The New Yorker. Homer's line about getting out of Springfield is lifted from It's a Wonderful Life, while Homer's all-time favorite song is revealed to be "It's Raining Men" by The Weather Girls.

== Reception ==
=== Ratings ===
In its original broadcast, "Fear of Flying" finished 48th (tied with Dateline NBC) in the ratings for the week of December 12 to December 18, 1994, with a Nielsen rating of 9.6. The episode was the third highest rated show on the Fox network that week, beaten only by Beverly Hills, 90210, and Married... with Children.

=== Critical reception ===
Since airing, the episode has received many positive reviews from fans and television critics.

Gary Russell and Gareth Roberts, the authors of the book I Can't Believe It's a Bigger and Better Updated Unofficial Simpsons Guide, said it was "a good Marge-centric episode with plenty of clever set pieces – the tributes to Cheers and Lost in Space are fantastic", and noted that "Marge's father looks suspiciously like Moe".

Ryan Keefer at DVD Verdict said that "with the cast of Cheers appearing (except for Grammer, ironically) and a funny spoof of North by Northwest, the episode is much better than you would expect", and gave it a B+. Colin Jacobson at DVD Movie Guide said in a review of the sixth season DVD that it was "another show I didn't recall fondly but that works exceedingly well. I hadn't realized how many quotes I've stolen from this one: the name 'Guy Incognito', the dog with the puffy tail, 'a burden coupled with a hassle'. The show makes little sense in regard to continuity since Marge has flown during prior shows, but it's consistently very funny and entertaining."

In July 2007, Simon Crerar of The Times listed the Cheers cast's performance as one of the thirty-three funniest cameos in the history of the show. The Phoenix named Anne Bancroft one of the twenty best guest stars to appear on the show.

== Home media ==
The episode was selected for release in a 1999 video collection of selected episodes titled: The Simpsons Go To Hollywood. Other episodes included in the collection set were "Flaming Moe's", "Krusty Gets Kancelled", and "Homer to the Max". "Fear of Flying" was again included in the 2003 DVD release of the same set. It was included in The Simpsons season 6 DVD set, which was released on August 16, 2005, as The Simpsons – The Complete Sixth Season.
