= The PTA Disbands =

- The Simpsons episode
- Episode no.: Season 6 Episode 21
- Directed by: Swinton O. Scott III
- Written by: Jennifer Crittenden
- Production code: 2F19
- Original air date: April 16, 1995

Guest appearance
- Marcia Wallace as Edna Krabappel

Episode features
- Chalkboard gag: "I do not have power of attorney over first graders"
- Couch gag: The living room is modeled after M. C. Escher's Relativity and the family runs in through the many complex and conflicting dimensions.
- Commentary: Matt Groening; David Mirkin; Swinton O. Scott III; David Silverman

Episode chronology
← Previous "Two Dozen and One Greyhounds"	Next → "'Round Springfield"
- The Simpsons season 6

"The PTA Disbands" is the twenty-first episode of the sixth season of the American animated television series, The Simpsons. It originally aired on Fox in the United States on April 16, 1995. In the episode, Bart Simpson manipulates Edna Krabappel into organizing a strike of Springfield Elementary's teachers union to protest Principal Skinner's miserly school spending, so Bart can skip class. Lisa Simpson craves the structure of school.

The episode was written by Jennifer Crittenden and directed by Swinton O. Scott III, with David Mirkin serving as show-runner. It received favorable mention in books on The Simpsons and media reviews, and was cited by academicians, who analyzed portions of the episode from physics and psychology perspectives.

== Plot ==
While visiting Fort Springfield on a field trip, Springfield Elementary students are attacked by a group of Civil War reenactors for trying to "learn for free", resulting in Üter being savagely beaten with rifle butts. Edna Krabappel subsequently calls out Principal Skinner's overzealous budget cuts, having reduced funds for bus maintenance, staff salaries, food and teaching materials. Bart schemes to exacerbate the disagreement between Edna and Skinner until she calls a teachers' union strike in protest.

While school is closed, students cope in their own ways: Lisa grows increasingly obsessive in her desire to be graded, Milhouse's work ethic improves after his parents hire a private tutor, and Jimbo finds himself immersed in the intricate plots of his mother's soap operas. Bart revels in his newfound freedom by playing tricks on construction workers and bank customers and flying a kite at night, much to Marge's unease, and continues to manipulate the conflict between Skinner and the teachers' union. With the two sides at an impasse and unable to reach an agreement at an emergency PTA meeting, Ned Flanders evokes the school's contingency plan of having classes taught by local volunteers.

While this ploy gets the children back to school, it has its own disadvantages: Professor Frink is ill-equipped to teach pre-schoolers, Jasper is forced to send Lisa's class home early when his beard gets stuck in a pencil sharpener, and Marge becomes Bart's teacher after he drives Moe and other substitutes away with his pranks. Bart becomes a laughingstock due to her excessive mothering. Frustrated, Bart locks Edna and Skinner in the principal's office for several hours to negotiate. They devise a plan to use the school's cloakrooms to house convicts from the overcrowded Springfield Penitentiary. This generates enough money to persuade the teachers to return to work and keep troublesome students in line, although Bart intends to free Snake Jailbird.

== Production ==
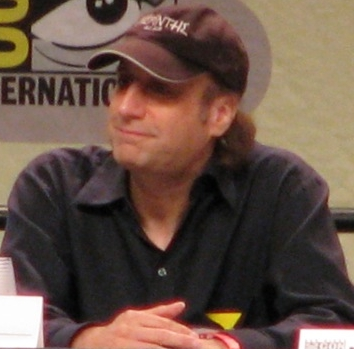
Much of the episode is based on David Mirkin's experience as a child with schools running out of money.

The episode was written by Jennifer Crittenden. She came into the writers' room and pitched the idea that there should be a teachers' strike in an episode. Then-show runner David Mirkin thought the episode had a lot of potential, and much of it is based on his experience as a child with schools running out of money. Despite the title of the episode, at no point does the school's parent–teacher association (PTA) actually disband. The title was suggested by Mirkin and was intended to poke fun at Crittenden, who thought the most exciting part of the teachers going on strike would be that the PTA might disband. In addition to this, Mirkin added a character to the episode who, on thinking the PTA has disbanded, jumps panicking out of a window. He jumps back in the same window when he is told the PTA has not disbanded.

The episode was directed by Swinton O. Scott III. In the opening shot of the episode, the bus that the children travel in to the field trip had to vibrate up and down to give the impression that it did not have bumpers and that it was falling apart. Scott said it was difficult to animate the scene because of the vibrating and the backgrounds panning. Milhouse's tutor in the episode is based on the American actor Tony Randall.

== Cultural references ==
During their field trip, the bus from Springfield Elementary arrives at the Fort Springfield Civil War site and skids into a cannon, knocking one of its wheels off. The cannon then points at the tower leg of a lookout, giving the impression that it will fire at the lookout and destroy it, which is a reference to the opening sequence of the television sitcom F Troop. The lookout was also modeled after the lookout in the show. The fact that "Diznee" purchased the site is a reference to the abandoned Disney's America project that was widely criticized as an attempt to turn heritage sites into vanity amusement parks. The scene in which Üter is left behind at the end of the field trip and assaulted by the reenactment actors is based on a scene from the 1965 film Von Ryan's Express.

Edna points at some school books and says: "The only books we have are ones that were banned by other schools." Skinner says: "Well, the kids have to learn about TekWar sooner or later," referencing William Shatner's series of science fiction novels. Other books in the bookshelf include Sexus by Henry Miller, Hop on Pop by Dr. Seuss, The Satanic Verses ("Junior Illustrated Edition") by Salman Rushdie, 40 Years of Playboy by Hugh Hefner, Steal This Book by Abbie Hoffman, and The Theory of Evolution.

Bart tells Skinner in the principal's office that Edna told him that Skinner "folds faster than Superman on laundry day", a reference to the comic book character Superman. That line is one of The Simpsons animator David Silverman's favorite lines on the show. When Edna announces that the piano tuners' local union joined them in a sympathy strike, the camera shows a single piano tuner, likely a reference to a classic Fermi problem, "how many piano tuners are there in Chicago?", applied to Springfield. Gabe Kaplan is one of Bart's victims on his substitute list, a reference to Kaplan and his character in the 1975 TV series Welcome Back, Kotter. The character at the bank who tells the angry crowd that their money's in "Bill's house, and Fred's house" is based on James Stewart's George Bailey character in the bank run scene from It's a Wonderful Life.

== Reception ==
In its original broadcast, "The PTA Disbands!" finished 69th in ratings for the week of April 10–16, 1995, with a Nielsen rating of 7.1. It was the 8th highest-rated show on the Fox network that week.

In their book I Can't Believe It's a Bigger and Better Updated Unofficial Simpsons Guide, Gary Russell and Gareth Roberts, describe "The PTA Disbands!" as "Possibly the best of the school episodes."

In a review of the sixth season of The Simpsons, Colin Jacobson of DVD Movie Guide writes: "I especially like the contrasts between how Bart and Lisa accept the strike. The show doesn’t quite manage to soar consistently, but it has more than enough to make it positive."

In his review of the episode for TV Squad, Adam Finley comments: "I love how Bart and Lisa both handle the news differently. Bart is thrilled ... Lisa, on the other hand, can't handle not being graded and evaluated every day, and slowly begins to lose her mind."

== Legacy ==
David Sims writes “The script for 'The PTA Disbands,' the second by Jennifer Crittenden, is an embarrassment of quotable riches. On beyond Jasper’s 'paddlin’' spiel, even: I’ll always love the way Moe breaks the out-of-left field It’s A Wonderful Life homage at the bank. And since the spring of 1995, no game of telephone has ended without some Simpsons-loving smart-ass dropping 'purple monkey dishwasher' into the chain.”

In 2004, when the voice actors for The Simpsons went on strike requesting additional income, The Scotsman cited a quote by Homer from the episode: "If you don't like your job, you don't strike. You just go in every day and do it really half-assed. That's the American Way." The Scotsman asserted "Homer would not approve" of the strike by the voice actors. The voice actors were asking for an increase from US$125,000 to $360,000 per episode. The same quote by Homer to Lisa was cited by Michael Schneider in Variety, who wrote: "...insiders note that the actors work just six to seven hours to voice an episode—which would mean $360,000 for a day's work, a figure that even Everybody Loves Raymond star Ray Romano doesn't match."

University of the Sciences in Philadelphia physics and mathematics professor Paul Halpern discusses the episode in his book What's Science Ever Done for Us?: What the Simpsons Can Teach Us About Physics, Robots, Life, and the Universe, and quotes Homer's admonition to Lisa: "Lisa, in this house, we obey the laws of thermodynamics!" at the beginning of Halpern's section on "Mechanical Plots". Halpern describes Lisa's efforts to build a perpetual-motion machine while bored during the teachers strike, and comments that though it is absurd in reality to order someone to obey the laws of thermodynamics, he acknowledges that "physicists sometimes don't know the proper arena within which certain laws apply". In the July 26, 2007 issue of Nature, the scientific journal's editorial staff listed "The PTA Disbands!" among "The Top Ten science moments in The Simpsons", writing: "Lisa gets so bored by a lack of schooling she builds a perpetual motion machine. Homer is not pleased: 'Lisa, in this house we OBEY the laws of thermodynamics.'"

The episode is cited by Robert M. Arkin and Philip J. Mazzocco in their work "Self-Esteem in Springfield", in the compilation book The Psychology of The Simpsons. Arkin and Mazzocco note an exchange between Edna Krabappel and Seymour Skinner, where Skinner exclaims to Krabappel: "Oh come on Edna: We both know these kids have no future! [All the children stop and look at him; he chuckles nervously] Prove me wrong, kids. Prove me wrong." Arkin and Mazzocco note that this example is seen as an exception, writing: "Generally, however, the Simpsons are right on target in their understanding of the importance of self-esteem and the dynamics involved in the interplay between the social world and positive self-regard."
