= Homie the Clown =

- The Simpsons episode
- Legs (left) is stumped by the similarities between Krusty the Clown (middle) and Homer Simpson (right). In order to make a clearer distinction between the latter two characters, David Silverman enhanced the lines around Krusty's eyes and reshaped his beard line.
- Episode no.: Season 6 Episode 15
- Directed by: David Silverman
- Written by: John Swartzwelder
- Production code: 2F12
- Original air date: February 12, 1995

Guest appearances
- Dick Cavett as himself; Johnny Unitas as himself; Joe Mantegna as Fat Tony

Episode features
- Chalkboard gag: "Next time it could be me on the scaffolding"
- Couch gag: The Simpsons sit down in midair; the couch builds itself on top of them.
- Commentary: Matt Groening; David Mirkin; Mark Kirkland; David Silverman

Episode chronology
← Previous "Bart's Comet"	Next → "Bart vs. Australia"
- The Simpsons season 6

"Homie the Clown" is the fifteenth episode of the sixth season of the American animated television series The Simpsons. It originally aired on Fox in the United States on February 12, 1995. In the episode, Homer becomes a Krusty the Clown impersonator, but is mistaken for the real Krusty by the Springfield Mafia. Joe Mantegna returned as Fat Tony, while Dick Cavett and Johnny Unitas guest starred as themselves.

The episode was written by John Swartzwelder and directed by David Silverman. Swartzwelder's script required very little rewriting and Silverman considers this one of the best episodes he has directed. He later used it to help him when directing The Simpsons Movie. One dropped storyline for The Simpsons saw Krusty being revealed as Homer's secret identity and this episode allowed writers to comment upon the similarity of the two characters' design. The episode features references to Close Encounters of the Third Kind, The Godfather, and The Maltese Falcon.

== Plot ==
Krusty's gambling debts and reckless spending land him in deep trouble with the Springfield Mafia. To make more money, he launches a training college for clowns. After seeing a billboard advertising it, Homer enrolls. After graduating, he impersonates Krusty at events that the real Krusty deems beneath him, such as children's birthday parties and the unveiling of a new sandwich at Krusty Burger.

The stress of impersonating Krusty makes Homer consider quitting. He soon discovers his uncanny resemblance to the clown has its benefits: Chief Wiggum rips up a speeding ticket when he mistakes Homer for Krusty, Apu gives him a discount at the Kwik-E-Mart, and he and his family are given preferential treatment at Luigi's restaurant.

Later, Homer realizes that impersonating Krusty also has its pitfalls. When Krusty flees abroad after betting against the Harlem Globetrotters and losing, and still in debt to the Mafia, Homer is kidnapped by the Mafia when they mistake him for Krusty. Don Vittorio DiMaggio tells Homer he will kill him unless he performs a loop-the-loop on a tiny bicycle, the only trick Homer never mastered at clown college. After he fails to perform the stunt to DiMaggio's satisfaction, the Mafioso is deeply offended.

After the real Krusty arrives (his attempts to alter his appearance via plastic surgery having failed) and the confused DiMaggio forces them to perform the stunt together on the same tiny bicycle. They succeed and their lives are spared, but DiMaggio still requires Krusty to pay off his gambling debt – which proves to be a mere $48.

== Production ==
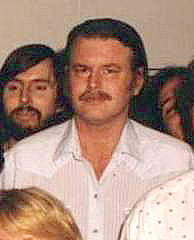
John Swartzwelder came up with the idea and wrote the script for the episode.

The episode was written by John Swartzwelder and directed by David Silverman. Swartzwelder came up with the idea and his script required very little rewriting. The episode is one of Silverman's favorites and he was pleased to direct it, after enjoying Swartzwelder's script. Silverman felt he himself "brought a lot to the party on [this] one", and although "people didn't like [Swartzwelder's script] at the read-through", Silverman thought "the script was really funny, and I had an idea for the opening and presented it with a lot of circus music that inspired the music they used for it. It was great fun." He used it, along with "Three Men and a Comic Book", to help him when directing The Simpsons Movie.

Brad Bird also helped Silverman, particularly with Krusty's design. An early idea for The Simpsons saw Krusty the Clown being revealed as Homer Simpson's secret stage identity. This storyline never developed, but this episode allowed writers to comment upon the design similarity of the two characters. Krusty's appearance and design is just that of Homer's, with clown make-up. Silverman enhanced the lines under Krusty's eyes, and reshaped his beard line in order to make a clearer distinction between the two characters.

Homer beating up the Estonian dwarf (who first appeared in "Burns' Heir") was a joke Matt Groening "had trouble with". David Mirkin wanted the scene to be violent, but Silverman stated that he thought he had animated the finished product to be too realistic. However, nothing was changed. Fox objected to the mafia buying ammunition from a Big 5 Sporting Goods until Mirkin pointed out that Big 5 sold ammunition. The second act break was, up until the animatic, after Fat Tony's line "cancel the world search".

Joe Mantegna returned as Fat Tony. Mirkin said Mantegna is a joy to direct and that Mantegna loves the role so much, he wishes to voice him "even if he only coughs". Dick Cavett guest-starred as himself. Mirkin commented that Cavett's part was probably the "meanest" they had ever been to a guest star. Cavett often told stories involving himself and other famous people and Mirkin decided to make light of that. Cavett did not have any objections.

== Cultural references ==
Silverman inserted a low-angle shot of Fat Tony sitting in a chair as a tribute to a similar shot of Sydney Greenstreet's character in The Maltese Falcon.

- The episode's title is reference to the character Homey D. Clown from the sketch comedy show In Living Color.
- Krusty lights a cigarette with an issue of Action Comics #1, the first appearance of Superman, and one of the rarest comic books of all time.
- Homer forms his mashed potatoes into a circus tent in a parody of Richard Dreyfuss' character forming his potatoes into a replica of Devils Tower in the film Close Encounters of the Third Kind (1977).
- The clown college has a sign reading "Formerly Willie Nelson's House", a reference to the singer's tax problems.
- The episode contains several references to films related to organized crime, such as the notes played on the wine glasses during Homer and Krusty's bicycle trick forming those of the theme from The Godfather (1972).
- Homer, having been kidnapped by the mob for resembling Krusty the Clown, attempts to explain that he's not actually Krusty with a fake name. Homer inadvertently stumbles upon Joe Valachi's name, whom the mobsters instantly recognize as "The same Joe Valachi who squealed to the senate about organized crime." Homer claims to be Benedict Arnold; Legs asks "The same Benedict Arnold who plotted to surrender West Point to the hated British?"
- Silverman inserted a low-angle shot of Fat Tony sitting in a chair as a tribute to a similar shot of Sydney Greenstreet's character in The Maltese Falcon (1941), while Don Vittorio is based on actors William Hickey and Don Ameche.
- Krusty is threatened with a lawsuit for patent infringement by George Carlin regarding "Seven Words You Can Never Say On Television", with Krusty telling his accountant to pay $10,000 to settle it out of court, as well as a similar fee when learning that Steve Martin was calling him for what was implied to be another lawsuit relating to the use of his catchphrase "Well, excuse me!" when signing off.

== Reception ==
In its original broadcast, "Homie the Clown" finished 59th (tied with Behind Closed Doors II) in the ratings for the week of February 5 to February 12, 1995, helping Fox to an overall Nielsen rating of 7.9. The episode was the fifth highest rated show on the Fox network that week.

Gary Russell and Gareth Roberts, the authors of the book I Can't Believe It's a Bigger and Better Updated Unofficial Simpsons Guide, stated the episode was "notable for its scenes of Homer on trying to emulate Krusty's mini-trike loop the loops".

Ryan Keefer of DVD Verdict felt it "features one of the more amusing stunts to cap an episode", giving it an A.

Colin Jacobson of DVD Movie Guide said in a review of the sixth season DVD that the episode "offers a truly terrific show", and praised the "clever Close Encounters reference, and the ways that it ties together Krusty's mob connection with Homer", concluding "it's a real winner".

Mike Brantley of The Mobile Register named "Homie the Clown" the 48th greatest television episode of all-time. When The Simpsons began streaming on Disney+ in 2019, former Simpsons writer and executive producer Bill Oakley named this one of the best classic Simpsons episodes to watch on the service.
