= Homer the Great =

- The Simpsons episode
- Homer being sworn in to the Stonecutters by Number One, who is voiced by Patrick Stewart in the episode.
- Episode no.: Season 6 Episode 12
- Directed by: Jim Reardon
- Written by: John Swartzwelder
- Production code: 2F09
- Original air date: January 8, 1995

Guest appearance
- Patrick Stewart as Number One

Episode features
- Chalkboard gag: "Adding "just kidding" doesn't make it okay to insult the principal"
- Couch gag: The living room is modeled after M. C. Escher's Relativity.
- Commentary: Matt Groening; David Mirkin; Dan Castellaneta; Yeardley Smith

Episode chronology
| ← Previous "Fear of Flying" | Next → "And Maggie Makes Three" |
- The Simpsons season 6

"Homer the Great" is the twelfth episode of the sixth season of the American animated television series The Simpsons. It originally aired on Fox in the United States on January 8, 1995. In the episode, Homer (Dan Castellaneta) joins an ancient secret society known as the Stonecutters.

The episode was written by John Swartzwelder and directed by Jim Reardon. Patrick Stewart guest-stars as "Number One", the leader of the Springfield chapter of the Stonecutters. It features cultural references to Freemasonry and the films Raiders of the Lost Ark and The Last Emperor.

The episode has received universal acclaim from fans and television critics and has been called one of the best episodes of the series by Gary Russell and Gareth Roberts in their book I Can't Believe It's a Bigger and Better Updated Unofficial Simpsons Guide.

The song "We Do" was nominated for a Primetime Emmy Award for Outstanding Original Music and Lyrics.

== Plot ==
After Homer notices that his coworkers Lenny and Carl enjoy special privileges at the Springfield Nuclear Power Plant, such as better chairs and better parking, he learns they are part of an ancient secret society known as the Stonecutters. To join, one must either be the son of a Stonecutter or save the life of a Stonecutter. While extolling the secret society at the dinner table, Homer discovers that his father is a member and is thus admitted.

After his initiation, Homer takes great pleasure in the society's secret privileges, such as better service, better chairs and a secret road that helps to avoid traffic. He still does not receive better parking, but is given rollerskates to get to work faster. During a celebratory dinner with his fellow Stonecutters, he unwittingly destroys their Hallowed Sacred Parchment. He is stripped of his Stonecutter robes and sentenced to walk home naked. Before he leaves, the Stonecutters see that Homer has a birthmark in the shape of their emblem, signifying he is the Chosen One who will lead them to greatness, as prophesied by the Hallowed Sacred Parchment.

Homer is crowned the new leader of the Stonecutters. While initially enjoying the power he receives, he soon feels isolated by his power when the other members treat him differently because he is their leader. When Homer asks Lisa for advice, she suggests that he have the Stonecutters perform volunteer work for the community. The Stonecutters perceive this as going mad with power and form a new society: the Ancient Mystic Society of No Homers.

Homer becomes despondent about losing his secret club. Marge consoles him by telling him he is a member of a very selective club: the Simpson family. To initiate Homer, Bart and Lisa paddle his butt.

== Production ==
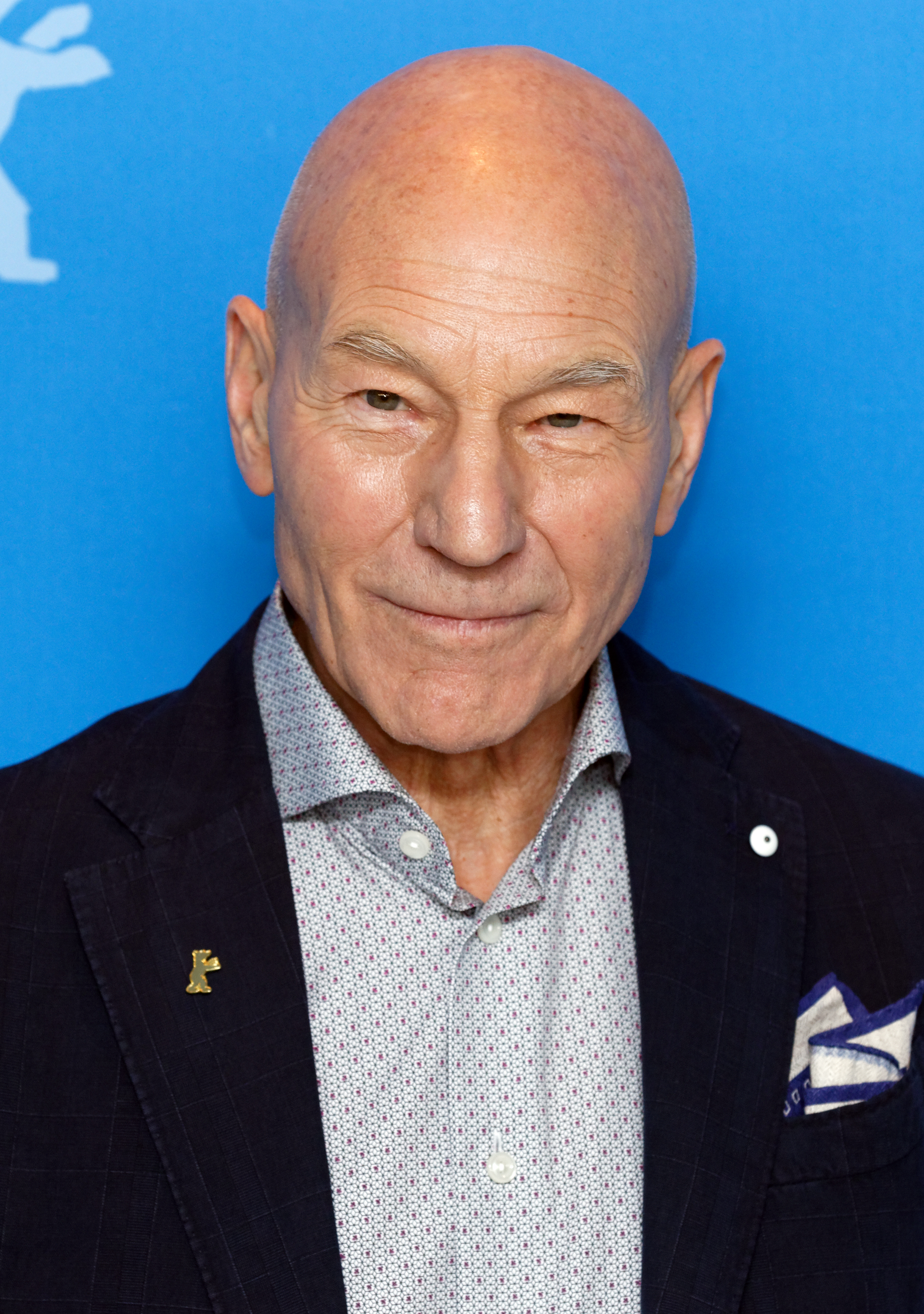
Patrick Stewart guest stars as Number One.

Although "Homer the Great" was written by John Swartzwelder, the story was suggested by executive producer David Mirkin. Mirkin did not have enough time to write the episode and asked Swartzwelder to do it. Mirkin came up with the idea while driving home from a rewrite early in the morning and listened to a religious radio station where they were talking about Freemasonry. Mirkin decided it would make a great episode, where many people in Springfield were members of a Masonic society and Homer was left on the outside and felt neglected.

The song "We Do" was not included in the original script and was suggested by Matt Groening. It was written by the writers' room, who threw in as many things that annoyed them as they possibly could. It was described as "one of the series' best musical numbers" by Colin Jacobson at DVD Movie Guide, and was later included in the clip show "All Singing, All Dancing".

The episode guest stars Patrick Stewart as Number One. He later said, "I think my appearance in The Simpsons and an appearance that I did on Sesame Street—in praise of the letter B—were perhaps the two most distinguished bits of work that I've done in the US." Mirkin stated that Stewart's appearance is "one of the best guest performances" because "he was so committed to [the] character".

== Cultural references ==
The term "Stonecutters" and the organization's symbol are references to Freemasonry. The Stonecutters are in possession of the Ark of the Covenant and when they burn Homer's underwear in it, spirits escape, a reference to Raiders of the Lost Ark (1981). When crowned "The Chosen One", Homer, dressed in finery, enters through some curtains, a reference to The Last Emperor (1987).

== Reception ==
In its original broadcast, "Homer the Great" finished 1st in the ratings for the week of January 2 to January 8, 1995. The episode was the highest rated show on the Fox network that week.

Since airing, the episode has received universal acclaim from fans and television critics and is often cited as one of the best episodes of the show.

The authors of the book I Can't Believe It's a Bigger and Better Updated Unofficial Simpsons Guide, Gary Russell and Gareth Roberts, called it "a brilliant crack at freemasonry, with all the secret signs, one-upmanship, rituals and unusual membership rules. Add to this Patrick Stewart's amazing voice and you have one of the better episodes of the series."

TV Squad's Adam Finley said the episode "does a great job of satirizing Freemasons". Colin Jacobson at DVD Movie Guide said in a review of the sixth season DVD: "I think it peters out a bit as it progresses; the best moments show the influence of the Stonecutters, and the show drags a little toward the end. Nonetheless, it still offers a solid piece of work."

Patrick Enwright of Today listed "Homer the Great" as his third favorite episode, saying, "as a whole [it] is (almost) unsurpassable". Dave Petruska of the Tucson Citizen named it his favorite episode "because it is such a wonderful satire on fraternal organizations and because of Patrick Stewart's hilarious guest-starring role as 'Number One'." In 2010, Michael Moran of The Times ranked it the fifth best in the show's history.

Total Film's Nathan Ditum ranked Stewart's performance as the ninth best guest appearance in the show's history.

John Swartzwelder and Alf Clausen were nominated for the Primetime Emmy Award for Outstanding Original Music and Lyrics for the song "We Do". It was featured on the album Songs in the Key of Springfield.
