= Lisa's Rival =

- The Simpsons episode
- Episode no.: Season 6 Episode 2
- Directed by: Mark Kirkland
- Written by: Mike Scully
- Production code: 1F17
- Original air date: September 11, 1994

Guest appearance
- Winona Ryder as Allison Taylor

Episode features
- Chalkboard gag: "No one is interested in my underpants" (recycled from "So It's Come to This: A Simpsons Clip Show")
- Couch gag: The Simpsons swim to the couch.
- Commentary: Matt Groening; David Mirkin; Mike Scully; Dan Castellaneta; Yeardley Smith; Mark Kirkland

Episode chronology
← Previous "Bart of Darkness"	Next → "Another Simpsons Clip Show"
- The Simpsons season 6

"Lisa's Rival" is the second episode of the sixth season of the American animated television series The Simpsons. It originally aired on Fox in the United States on September 11, 1994. Winona Ryder guest stars as Allison Taylor, a new student at Springfield Elementary School. Lisa Simpson begins to feel threatened by Allison because she is smarter, younger, and a better saxophone player. The episode's subplot sees Homer steal a large pile of sugar from a crashed truck and sell it door-to-door. This episode was originally going to air as part of Season 5 but aired as a season six episode due to the 1994 Northridge earthquake.

The episode was written by Mike Scully and directed by Mark Kirkland. "Lisa's Rival" was the first episode written by Scully. The episode was originally pitched by former writer Conan O'Brien, while the subplot was suggested by George Meyer. It features references to films such as The Fugitive and Scarface. Production of the episode was affected by the 1994 Northridge earthquake.

== Plot ==
Allison Taylor joins the second-grade class at Springfield Elementary. Noticing she and Allison have many interests in common, Lisa befriends Allison. However, Lisa discovers that Allison's academic and creative talents are superior to her own and begins to doubt herself. Lisa and Allison both audition for first chair in the school band. Lisa, overcome with jealousy, plays her saxophone so intensely she passes out. To Lisa's horror, Allison wins first chair.

Meanwhile, Homer finds an overturned sugar truck and steals large amounts of sugar. Homer hatches a scheme to get rich by selling sugar door-to-door. He keeps the sugar piled in his backyard, where he obsessively guards it. Marge grows annoyed by Homer's scheme and paranoia and tells him to get rid of the sugar pile at once. He refuses and accuses her of trying to sabotage his business prospects. Soon, the sugar attracts bees from a local apiary; two beekeepers track the swarm to Homer's yard and offer to buy the bees back for $2,000. Before the transaction is completed, rain starts to fall, dissolving the sugar. The bees fly away, leaving Homer with no money and no sugar.

Like Lisa was before her, Allison is teased by students who mock her interests. Allison invites Lisa for a play date at her house, where Lisa's insecurity increases further due to Allison's cultured family and her vast number of academic awards. Prior to Springfield Elementary's annual diorama competition, Bart offers to help Lisa sabotage Allison's well-constructed entry. Bart distracts the teachers and other students, allowing Lisa to switch Allison's diorama of "The Tell-Tale Heart" with one featuring a cow's heart. When Principal Skinner discovers the cow's heart diorama, he humiliates Allison in front of the students and faculty. Overcome by guilt, Lisa retrieves Allison's real diorama from its hiding place under the floor. However, Skinner is unimpressed by both Allison and Lisa's entries and gives first prize to Ralph's collection of Star Wars figurines. Lisa apologizes to Allison for sabotaging the contest; Allison forgives Lisa, and they become friends again. Ralph trips over his action figures, and Lisa and Allison invite him to play with them.

== Production ==
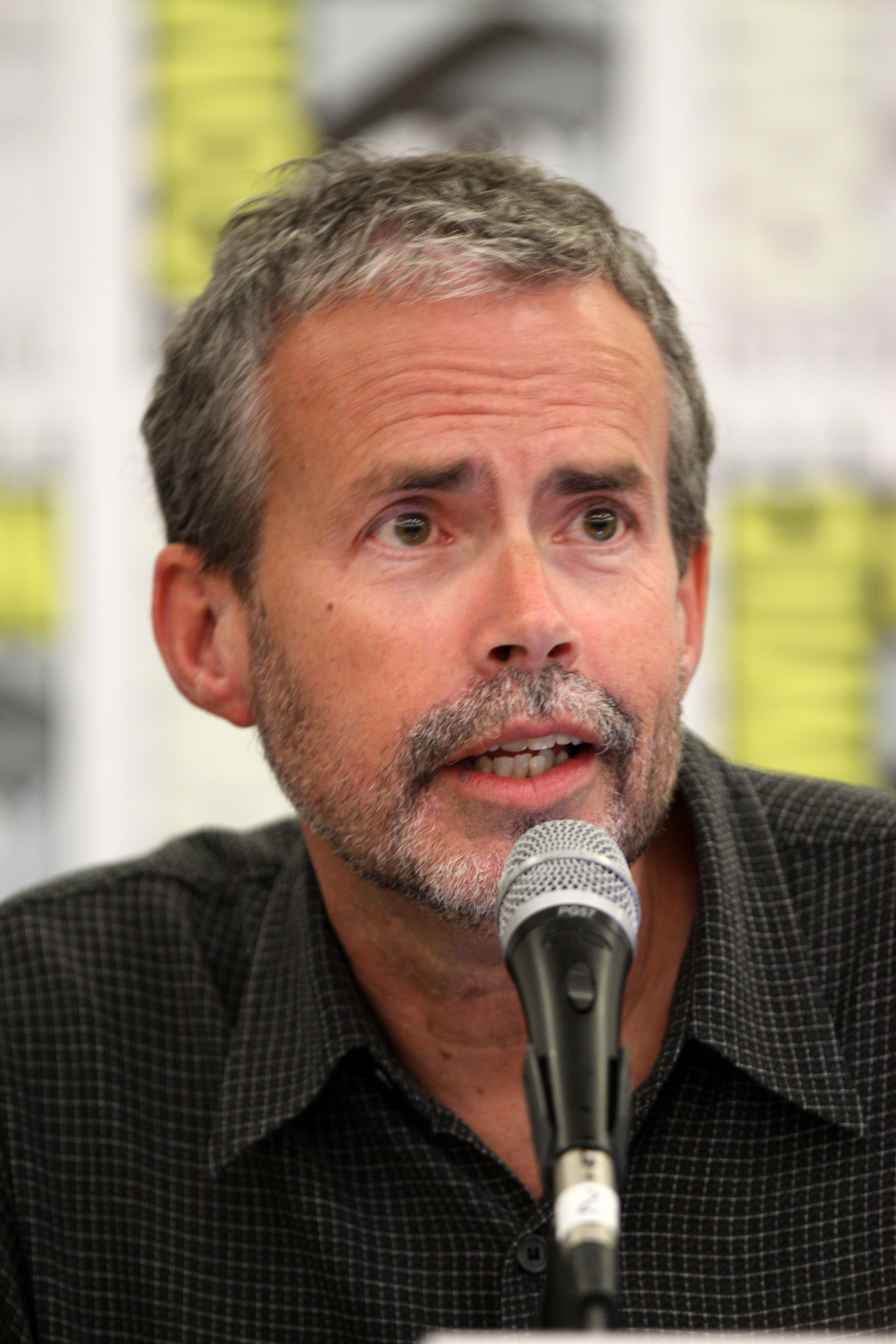
This was the first episode to be written by Mike Scully.

Production of the episode was disrupted by the 1994 Northridge earthquake, which also affected the previous episode "Bart of Darkness". The Film Roman building used by the staff was so badly damaged it had to be condemned. They were relocated to a new building for a year, and much of the animation for the episode was done by people at their own homes. The day after the earthquake, the only The Simpsons staff members who turned up for work were Bill Oakley and Josh Weinstein. Overall production of The Simpsons was disrupted for six months, with a month of production time being lost.

Although written by Mike Scully, the episode's original concept was pitched by Conan O'Brien before he left the show. O'Brien suggested having an episode about a rival for Lisa, but the rest of the episode's storyline was written by Scully and other staff members. It was the first episode Scully wrote for the show, and he would later become showrunner. Winona Ryder guest starred as Allison Taylor. She was a fan of the show and was popular amongst the staff. David Mirkin recalled that more writers came to her recording session than any other. Her character's name was derived from the names of two of Scully's daughters, Allison and Taylor. The subplot was pitched by George Meyer. Homer's sugar diatribe was pitched by Meyer off the top of his head and animated by David Silverman, who specifically asked to animate the scene after listening to Dan Castellaneta's performance.

== Cultural references ==
Marge is seen reading the maritime romance Love in the time of Scurvy, the title of which plays on Gabriel Garcia Marquez's Love in the Time of Cholera. Milhouse's sub-story is a reference to The Fugitive (1993). It is principally parodied in the scene where Milhouse is at the end of a dam drainpipe and dives into a waterfall when being held at gunpoint by an FBI agent resembling Tommy Lee Jones, who uses the film's famous line "I don't care". Homer's "In America" speech while guarding his sugar pile is a reference to Tony Montana's speech in Scarface (1983), and his line "Oh what a world!" when the sugar melts is from the Wicked Witch of the West in The Wizard of Oz (1939). The speech patterns of the beekeeper voiced by Hank Azaria are based on Adam West's portrayal of Batman.

At Allison's house, the family plays a game of anagrams, rearranging the letters in a person's name to make a description of that person. Allison's father gives her Alec Guinness and she comes up with "Genuine class". He gives Lisa Jeremy Irons and she comes up with "Jeremy's iron". Lisa imagines herself playing with "The Second Best Band in America", featuring the less-famous halves of pop music duos: Art Garfunkel of Simon & Garfunkel, Jim Messina of Loggins and Messina and John Oates of Hall & Oates. Allison's diorama is based on Edgar Allan Poe's "The Tell-Tale Heart", and Lisa's hiding of it under the gym floorboards is a parody of Poe's tale. For her diorama, Lisa constructs "all 75 characters from Oliver Twist ". Ralph's diorama contest entry is just original Star Wars action figures: his collection includes Luke Skywalker, Obi-Wan Kenobi, and Chewbacca.

== Reception ==
In its original American broadcast, "Lisa's Rival" finished tied for 23rd place (with Dateline NBC) in the weekly ratings for the week of September 5 to September 11, 1994, with a Nielsen rating of 9.9. It was the second highest rated show on the Fox Network that week.

In a 2008 article, Entertainment Weekly named Winona Ryder's role as Allison Taylor as one of the sixteen best The Simpsons guest stars, while IGN placed her sixth on their list of the "Top 25 Simpsons Guest Stars". They also highlighted Ralph's "classic" lines: "I bent my Wookiee", and "My cat's breath smells like cat food".

Gary Russell and Gareth Roberts, the authors of the book I Can't Believe It's a Bigger and Better Updated Unofficial Simpsons Guide, stated: "Despite being a Lisa show, it is poor Ralph Wiggum who steals the show with three great irrelevant replies, especially those concerning his cat's breath." They also highlighted "great scenes between the Simpson siblings, especially Bart's idea to conquer Allison using a hose pipe".
