= Swinton O. Scott III =

American animator and storyboard artist

Swinton O. Scott III is an American animator, storyboard artist, screenwriter, film and television producer, and film and television director. He is best known for his work on The Simpsons.

== Career ==
Scott has worked with producers Lou Scheimer and Hal Sutherland of Filmation, William Hanna and Joseph Barbera of Hanna-Barbera, Andy Heyward of DiC Entertainment, Gabor Csupo and Arlene Klasky, and Phil Roman. On September 2, 2021, it was announced that Scott would be making his feature film debut with Diary of a Wimpy Kid, a Disney+-exclusive film released on December 3, 2021.

== Directing credits ==
=== The Simpsons episodes ===
He has directed the following episodes:

Season Six

- "And Maggie Makes Three"
- "The PTA Disbands"

Season Seven

- "Bart on the Road"

Season Nine

- "Realty Bites"
- "The Trouble with Trillions"

Season Ten

- "Mayored to the Mob"
- "Maximum Homerdrive"

=== Futurama episodes ===
- "Bendless Love"
- "A Leela of Her Own"
- "Jurassic Bark"
- "Three Hundred Big Boys"

=== God, the Devil and Bob episodes ===
- "Andy Runs Away"
- "Bob Gets Greedy"
- "Bob Gets Involved"

=== The Looney Tunes Show episodes ===
- "Bobcats on Three!"
- "It's a Handbag!"

=== The Angry Beavers episode ===
- "Alley Oops"

=== Family Guy episode ===
- "If I'm Dyin', I'm Lyin'"
