= Jennifer Crittenden =

American screenwriter and producer

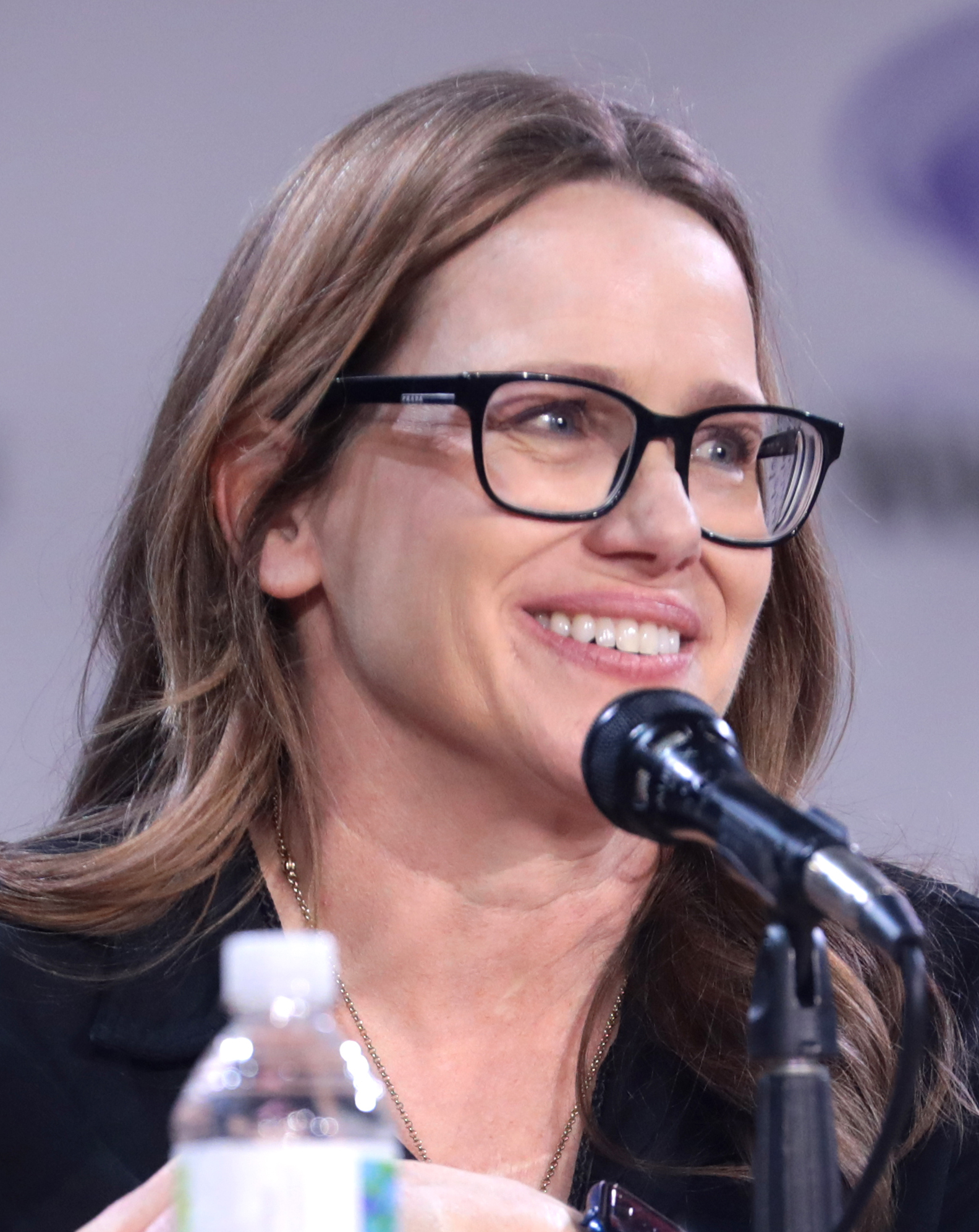
- Crittenden at the 2023 WonderCon
- Born: 1968 or 1969 (age 57–58)
- Education: Wesleyan University
- Occupations: Screenwriter and producer

Jennifer Crittenden (born 1968 or 1969) is an American screenwriter and producer. She started her writing career on the animated television series The Simpsons, and has since written for several other television sitcoms including Everybody Loves Raymond, Seinfeld and Veep. Her work has earned her several Emmy Award nominations.

== Personal life ==
Crittenden was educated at The Thacher School in Ojai, California. She graduated from Wesleyan University in 1992. Crittenden was married to fellow writer Jace Richdale for three years; they separated in 1998.

== Career ==
Crittenden has written five episodes for The Simpsons, the first being "And Maggie Makes Three" (1995) and the latest being "The Twisted World of Marge Simpson" (1997). Crittenden was taking a beginners' writing program at 20th Century Fox when former The Simpsons show runner David Mirkin hired her on the show. Crittenden's only writing experience before that had been as an intern on the Late Show with David Letterman. 20th Century Fox had introduced Crittenden to Mirkin, and Mirkin read a script of hers that he liked so he hired her.

In addition, she wrote and executive produced Everybody Loves Raymond, and served as a writer and producer on later seasons of Seinfeld, from 1996. Crittenden also worked on The Drew Carey Show, as a consulting producer on Arrested Development, and as a writer and co-executive producer on the CBS series The New Adventures of Old Christine. For her work, Crittenden has won two Humanitas Prizes and has earned five Emmy Award-nominations: four for "Outstanding Comedy Series" (Seinfeld in 1998 and Everybody Loves Raymond in 2000, 2001, and 2002) and one for "Outstanding Writing for a Comedy Series" (Everybody Loves Raymond in 2002).

Crittenden adapted the novel 20 Times a Lady for the 2011 film What's Your Number? alongside Gabrielle Allen. The two have a multi-show deal with ABC; their first project will focus on "a 'super cool' 1990s all-girl band who, after 20 years of bad blood, tries to reunite though they're no longer girls and no longer cool." They will write and executive produce the project.

== Writing credits ==
=== The Simpsons episodes ===
She is credited with writing the following episodes:

- "And Maggie Makes Three" (1995)
- "The PTA Disbands" (1995)
- "Scenes from the Class Struggle in Springfield" (1996)
- "22 Short Films About Springfield" (co-writer) (1996)
- "The Twisted World of Marge Simpson" (1997)

=== Seinfeld episodes ===
Crittenden joined the writing staff of Seinfeld for the final two seasons. She wrote the following episodes:

- "The Package" (1996)
- "The Little Jerry" (1997)
- "The Millennium" (1997)
- "The Apology" (1997)
- "The Burning" (1998)
- "The Puerto Rican Day" (co-writer) (1998)

=== HouseBroken episodes ===
She is credited with writing the following episodes:

- "Who's a Good Girl?" (2021 - episode #1)

=== Theatre ===
- Regency Girls, an original musical comedy, co-book writer with Gabrielle Allan.
