= List of Gravity Falls characters =

This is a list of every single character in the Disney XD television show Gravity Falls. Every single character on this list has appeared in either the first season of Gravity Falls or the second season of Gravity Falls.

== Overview ==
Character	Voiced by	Appearances						
Character	Voiced by	First	Season 1	Season 2	Weirdmageddon	Lost Legends	Legend of the Gnome Gemulets	Shorts
Main characters
Mason "Dipper" Pines	Jason Ritter	"Tourist Trapped" "Pilot" (unaired)	Main	Main	Main	Main	Main	Main
Mabel Pines	Kristen Schaal	"Tourist Trapped" "Pilot" (unaired)	Main	Main	Main	Main	Main	Main
Stanley "Grunkle Stan" Pines	Alex Hirsch	"Tourist Trapped" "Pilot" (unaired)	Main	Main	Main	Main	Main	Main
Jesus "Soos" Alzamirano Ramírez	Alex Hirsch	"Tourist Trapped" "Pilot" (unaired)	Main	Main	Main	Main	Main	Main
Wendy Blerble Corduroy	Linda Cardellini	"Tourist Trapped" "Pilot" (unaired)	Main	Main	Main	Main	Main	Main
Stanford Filbrick "Grunkle Ford" Pines	J. K. Simmons	"The Time; Traveler's Pig"		Main (Note: Stanford becomes a main character following "Not What He Seems"; episodes prior feature him, however instead as a cameo.)	Main	Main		
Bill Cipher	Alex Hirsch	"Dreamscaperers"	Guest	Recurring	Main			
Recurring characters
Waddles	Dee Bradley Baker	"The Time; Traveler's Pig"	Recurring	Recurring	Recurring	Recurring	Recurring	Recurring
Gompers the Goat	Dee Bradley Baker	"Tourist Trapped" "Pilot" (unaired)	Recurring	Recurring	Recurring	Recurring	Recurring	Guest
Fiddleford Hadron "Old Man" McGucket	Alex Hirsch	"The Legend of the Gobblewonker"	Recurring	Recurring	Recurring	Recurring	Guest	Guest
"Lil'" Gideon Charles Gleeful	Thurop Van Orman	"The Hand That; Rocks the Mabel"	Recurring	Recurring	Recurring	Guest	Guest	Guest
"Lazy" Susan Wentworth	Jennifer Coolidge	"Tourist Trapped" "Pilot" (unaired)	Recurring	Recurring	Recurring	Guest	Guest	Guest
Sheriff Daryl Blubs	Kevin Michael; Richardson	"The Legend of the Gobblewonker"	Recurring	Recurring	Recurring		Guest	Guest
Deputy Edwin Durland	Keith Ferguson	"The Legend of the Gobblewonker"	Recurring	Recurring	Recurring		Guest	Guest
Tobias "Toby" Determined	Gregg Turkington	"The Legend of the Gobblewonker"	Recurring	Recurring	Recurring		Guest	Guest
Daniel "Manly Dan" Corduroy	John DiMaggio	"The Legend of the Gobblewonker"	Recurring	Recurring	Recurring		Guest	Guest
Candy Chiu	Niki Yang	"Double Dipper"	Recurring	Recurring	Recurring		Guest	Guest
Grenda Grendinator	Carl Faruolo	"Double Dipper"	Recurring	Recurring	Recurring		Guest	Guest
Pacifica Elise Northwest	Jackie; Buscarino	"Double Dipper"	Recurring	Recurring	Recurring	Recurring	Guest	Guest
Robert Stacey "Robbie" Valentino	T.J. Miller	"The Inconveniencing"	Recurring	Recurring	Recurring		Guest	Guest
Tambry	Jessica DiCicco	"The Inconveniencing"	Recurring	Recurring	Recurring		Guest	Guest
Nate	Scott Menville	"The Inconveniencing"	Recurring	Recurring	Recurring		Guest	Guest
Lee	Mike Rianda	"The Inconveniencing"	Recurring	Recurring	Recurring		Guest	Guest
Thompson	Mike Rianda	"The Inconveniencing"	Recurring	Recurring	Recurring		Guest	Guest
Buddy "Bud" Gleeful	Stephen Root	"The Hand That; Rocks the Mabel"	Recurring	Recurring	Recurring		Guest	Guest
The Gnomes	Alex Hirsch	"Tourist Trapped" "Pilot" (unaired)	Recurring	Recurring	Guest	Guest	Recurring	
Shmebulock	Alex Hirsch	"Tourist Trapped" "Pilot" (unaired)	Recurring	Recurring	Guest	Recurring	Recurring	
Preston Northwest	Nathan Fillion	"Irrational Treasure"	Guest	Recurring	Recurring	Recurring	Guest	
Priscilla Northwest	Kari Wahlgren	"Irrational Treasure"	Guest	Recurring	Recurring	Recurring	Guest	
Abuelita	Matt Chapman	"Gideon Rises"	Guest	Recurring	Recurring		Guest	
Rumble McSkirmish	Brian Bloom	"Fight Fighters"	Guest	Guest	Recurring	Recurring		
Tyler Cutebiker	Will Forte	"The Legend of the Gobblewonker"	Recurring	Recurring	Recurring			
Blendin Blenjamin Blandin	Justin Roiland	"Tourist Trapped" "Pilot" (unaired)	Recurring	Recurring	Recurring			
Agent Powers	Nick Offerman	"Scary-oke"		Recurring				
Agent Jeff Trigger	Brad Abrell	"Scary-oke"		Recurring				
8-Ball	Andy Merrill	"Weirdmageddon Part 1: Xpcveaoqfoxso"			Recurring	Guest		
Teeth	Andy Merrill	"Weirdmageddon Part 1: Xpcveaoqfoxso"			Recurring			
Keyhole	Matt Chapman	"Weirdmageddon Part 1: Xpcveaoqfoxso"			Recurring	Guest		
Paci-Fire	Matt Chapman	"Weirdmageddon Part 1: Xpcveaoqfoxso"			Recurring			
Kryptos	Matt Chapman	"Weirdmageddon Part 1: Xpcveaoqfoxso"			Recurring			
Hectorgon	Patrick McHale	"Weirdmageddon Part 1: Xpcveaoqfoxso"			Recurring			
Pyronica	Danielle Fishel	"Weirdmageddon Part 1: Xpcveaoqfoxso"			Recurring			
The Horrifying Sweaty One-Armed Monstrosity	Louis C.K. (Note: As of December 21, 2017, Louis C.K. has been dubbed out of this role for future airings due to his sexual assault allegations. Series creator Alex Hirsch redubbed this character and is credited for doing so at the end of the re-dubbed rerun.)	"Weirdmageddon Part 1: Xpcveaoqfoxso"			Recurring			
The Horrifying Sweaty One-Armed Monstrosity	Alex Hirsch	"Weirdmageddon Part 1: Xpcveaoqfoxso"			Recurring			
The Creature With Eighty-Eight Different Faces	Alex Hirsch	"Weirdmageddon Part 1: Xpcveaoqfoxso"			Recurring			
Zanthar	—N/a	"Weirdmageddon Part 1: Xpcveaoqfoxso"			Recurring			
Amorphous Shape	—N/a	"Weirdmageddon Part 1: Xpcveaoqfoxso"			Recurring			
Eye Bats	—N/a	"Weirdmageddon Part 1: Xpcveaoqfoxso"			Recurring			
Lava Lamp-Shaped Demon	—N/a	"Weirdmageddon Part 1: Xpcveaoqfoxso"			Recurring			

== Main characters ==
=== Dipper Pines ===
Mason "Dipper" Pines (voiced by Jason Ritter) is the 12-year-old twin brother of Mabel, who was born 5 minutes after her. He possesses Journal 3, which he discovered in the woods and has helped him solve the mysteries of Gravity Falls. As an adventurer, Dipper has trouble sitting still and is always looking for riddles to solve, leaving him restless in mundane situations. His attention to detail seems helpful when solving mysteries, but others question his credibility. He is considered wise beyond his years and cannot wait to grow up and become a man. He is portrayed as goal-oriented and rooted in facts, and sometimes overthinks possible scenarios and obsessively makes lists, which also makes him more perceptive of the danger Gravity Falls faces. Between seasons, Dipper hosted a series titled "Dipper's Guide to the Unexplained". It is revealed early in season 1 that Dipper has a crush on Wendy. While he knows that he will never really be her boyfriend, this does not stop him from trying to please her. Another episode reveals that he likes bubblegum pop music (Dipper vs. Manliness). He got his nickname from a birthmark on his forehead shaped like the Big Dipper. His formal name was never revealed during the series, but was later revealed to be Mason in the release of Journal 3.

=== Mabel Pines ===
Mabel Pines (voiced by Kristen Schaal) is the 12-year-old twin sister of Dipper, who was born 5 minutes before him. She is eccentric, energetic, and optimistic, and expresses herself through various colorful knitted sweaters, as well as her skills in arts and crafts. Her outgoing, curious personality often helps Dipper solve mysteries, though her silliness is often seen as a burden. Mabel enjoys preteen novels and seeks romance, as she once went on a date with Li'l Gideon, but broke it off after realizing he is dangerous and nearly killed Dipper. In the episode "Irrational Treasure", she is made an official U.S. congresswoman by the eighth-and-a-half president, Quentin Trembley, with a political platform of "legalize everything". She wins a pet pig in the episode "The Time Traveler's Pig" and names him Waddles. She also makes guest appearances in "Dipper's Guide to the Unexplained", and has her own series titled "Mabel's Guide to Life". She is inspired by Alex Hirsch's twin sister, Ariel.

=== Stanley "Stan" Pines ===
Stanley "Stan" Pines (also known as Grunkle Stan) (voiced by Alex Hirsch as an adult and Declan J. Krogman as a child) is the great-uncle (or "grunkle" for short) of Dipper and Mabel, who is best characterized by his grumpyness, selfishness and abrasiveness. He has been going by the name Stanford Pines, the name of his older twin brother, but his real name is Stanley. He runs and lives in the Mystery Shack; a tourist trap billed as "the world's most bizarre museum". He is primarily a salesman, putting most of his effort into showmanship, and is eager to sell the Shack's knick-knacks, trinkets, and baubles for exorbitant prices in the gift store section. Because of his drive to make money, his methods of obtaining it are not always legal and frequently commits petty crimes, having a laundry list of crimes a mile long. When he's not making money, he is usually at home watching television. Stan usually wears a fez and carries around an 8-ball topped cane; he sometimes wears an eyepatch over his glasses. He frequently sends the twins on what they consider outrageous and unpredictable errands, but is protective and loving towards them. Despite his age, Stan is physically fit to the point of being able to fight back when threatened. Behind his vending machine, he has a hidden staircase to an unknown location, which the season 1 finale reveals contains a large hidden device powered by encrypted information in the three journals. Later, he collects all three after Li'l Gideon's arrest and after Dipper shows him Journal 3, but later returns it to him. "Not What He Seems" reveals he was attempting to retrieve his older twin brother Ford after he was stranded in another dimension. In the series finale, Stan sacrifices his memory to defeat Bill, but regains it after seeing Mabel's scrapbook. He is based on Alex Hirsch's grandfather Stan.

=== Soos ===
Jesus Alzamirano "Soos" Ramirez (voiced by Alex Hirsch) is a 22-year-old Hispanic man who works as a handyman at the Mystery Shack and is a friend of Dipper and Mabel, who provides transportation when needed. He is a portly and adventurous man-child with buck teeth, which is frequently compared to that of a beaver. He is clumsy and often makes mistakes, but has various talents, including engineering, DJing, and pinball, and enjoys bonding with Dipper by doing "boy stuff". "Blendin's Game" reveals his birthday to be July 13. It was also revealed he did not have a good father-son relationship with his dad. At the end of the series, after Ford and Stan leave Gravity Falls, Soos becomes the new Mr. Mystery of the Mystery Shack. After breaking up with his dating sim girlfriend, GIFfany, Soos enters a long-distance relationship with Melody, a girl from Portland who moves to Gravity Falls and becomes the Mystery Shack's new cashier after he takes over. Hirsch based Soos on Jesus Chambrot, an animator he was friends with at CalArts. Hirsch emulates Jesus' "blunt-like consonance" way of speaking through Soos' voice.

=== Wendy Corduroy ===
Wendy Corduroy (voiced by Linda Cardellini) is a tomboyish yet laid-back 15-year-old who works as a part-time employee at the Mystery Shack. She is Dipper's crush, and several episodes focus on his attempts to impress her. Wendy has stated that she had many boyfriends, including one ex-boyfriend whom she cannot remember breaking up with. Wendy is the oldest and tallest child in her family; her father is Manly Dan, one of the local lumberjacks and fishermen of Gravity Falls. Throughout the series, she proves herself to be her "father's daughter", having experience as a lumberjack, tremendous physical strength, and survival skills. Being a typical sociable and nonchalant teen, she has many friends around her age. Her boyfriend at the start of the series is Robbie, whom Dipper despises and sees as a rival until she breaks up with him. Wendy later politely rejects Dipper, saying she is too old for him, and they remain close friends.

=== Stanford "Ford" Pines ===
Stanford Filbrick "Ford" Pines (also known as The Author, Grunkle Ford, and Great Uncle Ford as of "The Last Mabelcorn"; voiced by J. K. Simmons as an adult, Christian Mardini as a child) is Stan's six-fingered long-lost identical older twin brother, Mabel and Dipper's great-uncle, and the author of the journals. "Not What He Seems" reveals that in 1982, he was transported into an alternate dimension through a portal underneath the Mystery Shack, which he was stranded in until Stan reopened the portal. In "The Last Mabelcorn", he recounts his partnership with Bill Cipher and how he attempted to create a teleporter to enter his realm. In the present, after learning of Bill's plan to invade the mainstream dimension, he destroys the teleporter, but at the cost of a dimensional rift leaking out of it, which he contains. In "Dipper and Mabel vs. the Future", Bill takes the body of Blendin Blandin, tricking Mabel into giving him the rift, before breaking the glass ball containing the rift, and causing Weirdmageddon. In "Weirdmageddon Part 1", he attempts to defeat Bill, but is captured, petrified, and his journals are destroyed. He is later freed and restored to normal. After Weirdmageddon, he tells Stan that he found remaining anomalies and offers him to go sailing around the world with him to find them, which Stan accepts.

== Villains ==
=== Bill Cipher ===
Bill Cipher (voiced by Alex Hirsch) is an extremely powerful interdimensional dream demon and the main antagonist of the series. He is a one-eyed yellow triangle that resembles an Eye of Providence and wears a top hat and a bow tie. Living in the Nightmare Realm, an interdimensional area lacking consistent laws of physics, Bill has the ability to make deals with and possess others. He first appears physically in "Dreamscaperers", where Li'l Gideon summons him to steal Grunkle Stan's deed to the Mystery Shack. In "Sock Opera", Bill tricks Dipper into making a deal with him, briefly possessing his body until Mabel forces him out by exhausting Dipper's body until he eventually collapses, forcing Bill out. In "Dipper and Mabel vs. the Future", Bill possesses Blendin Blandin to release a dimensional rift, which allows Bill to escape the Nightmare Realm.

In "Weirdmageddon", Bill takes on a physical form, unleashes various monsters from the Nightmare Realm such as Pyronica, 8 ball, Teeth, and Zanfar, and takes over Gravity Falls. However, he realizes that a force field prevents him from escaping Gravity Falls to conquer the rest of the universe. Bill fails to destroy the force field and is thought to be destroyed for good by Stan. However, his last words, when played in reverse, are revealed to be "A-X-O-L-O-T-L MY TIME HAS COME TO BURN, I INVOKE THE ANCIENT POWER THAT I MAY RETURN!"

In the book Dipper and Mabel and the Curse of the Time Pirates' Treasure!: Select Your Own Choose-Venture, there is a coded link that leads to a hidden interaction between Dipper and Mabel and the Axolotl, in which Dipper asks about Bill Cipher. The Axolotl responds with the following poem: "Sixty degrees that come in threes. Watches from within birch trees. Saw his own dimension burn. Misses home and can't return. Says he's happy. He's a liar. Blame the arson for the fire. If he wants to shirk the blame, He'll have to invoke my name. One way to absolve his crime. A different form, a different time."

The crime referenced in the poem is further detailed in the Journal 3 and The Book of Bill which state that he caused a catastrophe that resulted in the annihilation of his home dimension Euclydia, known throughout the multiverse as "The Euclidean Massacre". Although Bill pejoratively describes the Flatland-like Euclydia as "flat minds in a flat world with flat dreams", The Book of Bill references multiple times the immense guilt he feels, and implies the Euclidean Massacre may not have been intentional. His parent's names were Scalene and Euclid, and he draws pictures of them in the Theraprism. The Book of Bill reveals that because of his final words, Bill is sent to a "tank outside of space" where a deity known as the Axolotl resides. Bill is spared by the Axolotl and sent to the Theraprism, an interdimensional mental hospital, with the book itself revealed to be created by Bill during therapeutic arts and crafts sessions.

Film director David Lynch was offered to voice Bill, but declined the role. Hirsch voices the character with what he calls a "bad impression" of Lynch, as his Twin Peaks character, Gordon Cole. Bill has enjoyed a prominent status in the Gravity Falls fandom and in popular culture, possessing a cameo role in The Simpsons episode "Bart's in Jail!" and serving as the subject of the real world Cipher Hunt, a scavenger hunt to find a stone statue of Bill. The Mary Sue described Bill Cipher as one of the "sexiest" Tumblr Sexymen, writing that Bill's "confusing and scary" nature made him attractive to Gravity Falls fans online. Critical analysis of Bill by Ars Technica has credited him as being the manifestation of the fear of the unknown, with journalist Cassandra Khaw noting Bill as one of the most prominent incarnations of fear within Gravity Falls. Part of Bill's intrigue for fans comes from his mysterious presence; he has a cameo appearance in the end of Gravity Falls’ opening credits and is spotted in multiple freeze-frame shots throughout the series.

=== Gideon Gleeful ===
Gideon Charles Gleeful / "Li'l Gideon" (voiced by Thurop Van Orman) is a young boy who owns the "Tent of Telepathy", a successful competitor of the Mystery Shack and is recognizable by his Southern accent and white pompadour. As the secondary antagonist of the series, Gideon has a deep rivalry with Grunkle Stan that presumably started long before the beginning of the series. Despite the cutesy and charming personality he presents to others, in reality he is conniving, vicious, and willing to hurt or kill others to get his way; he even abused his parents, threatening his father and seemingly having reduced his mother to a nervous wreck some time ago. He also has an unhealthy obsession with Mabel, and his belief that Dipper and Stan are the only things keeping them apart prevents him from seeing that Mabel does not like him. He previously owned an amulet that endowed him with telekinesis, but Mabel destroyed it after he attempts to use it to kill Dipper. He also owns Journal 2, and as such seems to be one of the only residents who are aware of the mysteries and secrets of Gravity Falls. He seeks to gain possession of the Mystery Shack, saying it has 'a secret you couldn't possibly begin to imagine'. In the Season 1 finale, Stan reveals to the townspeople that Li'l Gideon's psychic ability is a ruse and that Li'l Gideon is a fraud. Li'l Gideon is arrested by Sheriff Blubs shortly thereafter, although he quickly managed to get his fellow inmates to follow him. In "Weirdmageddon Part 1", he and his fellow inmates escape from prison and are made Bill's police force and guardians of a prison bubble Mabel is put in. After attempting to capture Dipper, Wendy, and Soos, Dipper manages to convince Gideon that Mabel never loved him, and Gideon has a change of heart and decides to rebel against Bill. In "Weirdmageddon Part 3: Take Back the Falls", he is revealed to have been captured by Bill, trapped in a cage, and forced to dance for eternity, but is freed after he tells Dipper and Mabel how to restore the humanity of the citizens Bill petrified. After Bill's defeat, he officially gives up his life of crime and tries to live a normal life.

=== Gnomes ===
The Gnomes (voiced by Alex Hirsch) consist of Jeff, Carson, Steve, Jason, and Shmebulock. They appear in the first episode, where they capture Mabel by disguising themselves as a boy named "Norman" for her to date to try and make her their queen, only for Dipper to save her. They appear as garden gnomes with pointed red caps and white beards, although they often run on all fours and have sharp teeth. The leader, Jeff, has sworn vengeance on the twins. Shmebulock and his father, Shmebulock Sr., can only communicate by saying their names; Lost Legends reveals this is the result of a curse placed on them by a witch, and they are able to speak normally for a single night once every several centuries. Later on in the series, Dipper and Mabel call upon them to help take down a common enemy, but fail as Gideon forces them to carry them away.

=== Henchmaniacs ===
The Henchmaniacs are a gang of interdimensional demons who are released in "Weirdmageddon" and unleash havoc upon Gravity Falls under their master Bill Cipher's command. They are sent back to the Nightmare Realm after Bill's defeat in the series finale.

==== 8-Ball ====
8--Ball (voiced by Andy Merrill) is a green-skinned creature that resembles a goblin or troll. He has a muscular upper body with a white chest and stomach and magic 8-balls for eyes. He also has large ears, a prominent underbite, large teeth, and shackles around his right wrist and ankle with a broken chain dangling from them.

==== Kryptos ====
Kryptos is a polygonal demon who resembles Bill but is rhombus or square in shape and gray in color. The top perimeter of his shape resembles a compass with a functioning eye at the turning point, and the bottom perimeter resembles a square ruler. He has a wide mouth with buckteeth and a small light blue aura surrounding him; he also wears black gloves and boots.

==== Zanthar ====
Zanthar, also known as "The Being Whose Name Must Never Be Said", is a dark purple gorilla-like creature with a light-purple patch on his body shaped like a piece of bread and small trees growing out of his back and shoulders. He also wears a small party hat.

==== Teeth ====
Teeth (voiced by Andy Merrill) are an anthropomorphic pair of dentures with pink elongated gums, limbs, and a small pink aura surrounding it.

==== Keyhole ====
Keyhole (voiced by Matt Chapman) is a blue-skinned humanoid with a forehead resembling a keyhole, a darker shade of blue around his eyes, a pink nose, and a small blue aura surrounding him.

==== Hectorgon ====
Hectorgon (voiced by Patrick McHale) is a floating red anthropomorphic hexagon with tangerine lips and a moustache. He wears bowler hat with a gold rim and a light blue tie, and has a small red aura surrounding it.

==== Amorphous Shape ====
Amorphous Shape is a floating unfolded Rubik's Cube composed of many colorful contorted squares, several of which have eyes on them. She has two long dark purple tail-like protrusions with larger blue tufts at the ends hanging off of the two purple-colored squares on her body, and has a small white aura surrounding her.

==== Pyronica ====
Pyronica (voiced by Danielle Fishel) is a glowing pink succubus-like humanoid with short pink hair with parted bangs. She has two large curved horns on her head with several small horns between them and limbs made of white flames. She also has a single eye and a wide mouth with thick lips and a frog-like tongue, and wears a long pink cape and pink stiletto pumps.

==== Paci-Fire ====
Paci-Fire (voiced by Matt Chapman) is a demonic dark-gray baby with black horns resembling bat ears, a pink bull-like nose, glowing red eyes, a black devil-like tail, and a red aura surrounding him. He also has a red pacifier being sucked by a second face on his torso and a gold cross on his massive forehead with an eye similar to Bill's at its center. He seems to have some mental command over the Eye Bats and claims to have "butchered millions on countless moons".

==== Lava Lamp Guy ====
The Lava Lamp Guy is a lava lamp-like demon with two red lava blobs shaped like eyes and red circles visible inside of his body. He also wears a black and red bowler hat.

==== Eye Bats ====
The Eye Bats are living bat-sized eyeballs with a bat's ears, wings, and legs. Aside from flight, their only known power is laser-eyebeams and telekinesis. The lasers petrify anyone caught in them and the telekinetic abilities are used lift the petrified citizens to be placed on the 'Frozen Throne of Human Agony'.

==== Horrifying Sweaty One-Armed Monstrosity ====
The Horrifying Sweaty One-Armed Monstrosity (originally voiced by Louis C.K., redubbed by Alex Hirsch in 2017) is a giant monster composed of a head with an arm on top which asks people to get into his mouth, although in a non-threatening manner.

==== Creature With Eighty-Eight Different Faces ====
The Creature With Eighty-Eight Different Faces (voiced by Alex Hirsch) is a multi-colored being with many different faces. In "Weirdmageddon Part 2: Escape From Reality", Bill mentions it has eighty-seven different faces by accident, and the Creature gets defensive.

== Recurring characters ==
=== Waddles ===
Waddles (vocal effects provided by Dee Bradley Baker, voiced by Neil deGrasse Tyson in "Little Gift Shop of Horrors") is Mabel's pet pig, who she won at a country fair.

=== Candy Chiu and Grenda Grendinator ===
Candy Chiu (voiced by Niki Yang) and Grenda Grendinator (voiced by Carl Faruolo) are Mabel's best friends, whom she first meets at a party hosted by the Mystery Shack. Candy and Grenda are both considered unpopular by Pacifica and her more sociable friends due to their flaws. Candy is sweet, but shy and insecure, and also wears glasses. Grenda is physically robust and speaks with a deep, masculine voice which she attributes to puberty. Despite others seeing these qualities as flaws, Mabel sees them as endearing. They love Waddles as much as Mabel and share common interests with her, such as the paranormal, romance novels, preteen magazines, and the boy band Sev'ral Timez. Although Grenda originally had no last name, a fan suggested it to Alex Hirsch on Tumblr that her last name should be "Grendinator", and Hirsch deemed it canon.

=== Fiddleford McGucket ===
Fiddleford Hadron "Old Man" McGucket (voiced by Alex Hirsch) is the "local kook" of Gravity Falls. Despite his apparent insanity and stereotypical hillbilly demeanor, Old Man McGucket is a technical mastermind, capable of creating massive, complex animatronics and a skilled chemist. His son works as a ranger at the lake, and the two seem to have a strained relationship. "Society of the Blind Eye" reveals some of his backstory and that his full name is Fiddleford Hadron McGucket. His backstory is explored in "Society of the Blind Eye" and "A Tale of Two Stans": in the 1970s, he was once a garage computer inventor in Palo Alto before Stanford called upon him to work on his trans-dimensional portal. After accidentally entering the portal and glimpsing what was on the other side, he was so overcome with horror that he invented a machine to allow him to forget the experience. Over time, he founded the Society of the Blind Eye to protect Gravity Falls's inhabitants from its various monsters and anomalies by forcing them to forget their existence. Eventually, his overuse of the machine on his own mind drove him insane. Dipper and Mabel find the machine, along with the townspeople's memories, and he regains his sanity. In "Weirdmageddon Part 3: Take Back the Falls", he assists the Pines in saving Ford by transforming the Mystery Shack into a giant robotic mech. He and his son later move into the Northwest Mansion after earning millions by selling the patents of his inventions to the government after the events of Weirdmaggedon. Journal 3 reveals he created the Memory Gun after being attacked by a Gremloblin and the Society of the Blind Eye to erase bad memories.

=== Pacifica Northwest ===
Pacifica Elise Northwest (voiced by Jackie Buscarino) is the most popular girl in Gravity Falls. She comes from a wealthy family, being the great-great-granddaughter of the supposed founder of Gravity Falls, Nathaniel Northwest. However, the true founder of Gravity Falls was Quentin Trembley, the eighth-and-a-half President of the United States. Pacifica is sarcastic and spoiled and is Mabel's primary rival, as she looks down on Mabel and thinks her eccentric personality is annoying and immature. She uses people's insecurities to manipulate them into doing what she wants and despises Mabel for standing up against her. She gets her comeuppance after Dipper reveals her family's prestige is built on a lie. In the episode "The Golf War", she befriends Mabel after they work together to thwart the Lilliputtians. "Northwest Mansion Mystery" shows that she is afraid of standing up to her parents and disappointing them. However, after learning what her family has done, she proves herself to be different from her family by defying her parents and opening up the Northwest Mansion gates to commoners. After the events of the episode, Pacifica and Dipper become friends. In "Weirdmageddon Part 3: Take Back the Falls", Pacifica takes refuge in the Mystery Shack along with several of the remaining un-petrified citizens of Gravity Falls and teams up with the Pines to defeat Bill. By the end of the series, she is good friends with the Pines family. Her name is a pun on Pacific Northwest, given the town of Gravity Falls is located in Oregon. The graphic novel "Gravity Falls: Lost Legends" reveals that when she was a child, her mother convinced her that her appearance is important, leading her to believe she must be beautiful to be accepted; other ancillary material reveals she became a waitress at Greasy's Diner after Weirdmageddon.

=== Gompers ===
Gompers (vocal effects provided by Dee Bradley Baker) is a stray goat who lives in the forest near the Mystery Shack.

=== Sheriff Blubs ===
Sheriff Blubs (voiced by Kevin Michael Richardson) is the sheriff of Roadkill County, the county that Gravity Falls is located in. He is shown to be lazy, often choosing to sit around instead of pursuing a case. Despite his apparent lack of police skills, he believes himself superior to all and often looks down on the twins. His lazy personality seems to stem from the low crime rate in Gravity Falls, as shown when Deputy Durland comments on how their equipment is often left unused. In the series finale, he expresses his love for Deputy Durland.

=== Deputy Durland ===
Deputy Durland (voiced by Keith Ferguson) is a police officer who is Sheriff Blubs' partner and assistant. He is shown to be unintelligent, childlike, and illiterate. Blubs, however, seems to find these qualities endearing and refers to him as a "diamond in the rough". Instead of "doing their duties", he and Blubs like to joke around and ignore their duty to have fun. In the end-credits scene of "Blendin's Game", it is revealed that in 2002 he used to work as a handyman at the Mystery Shack, but due to his unreliability and clumsiness, Stan fired him and replaced him with Soos. In "Weirdmageddon Part 1", Durland is among the citizens of Gravity Falls who are petrified by Bill. At the end of Weirdmaggedon, he is restored to normal and reunited with Blubs. In the series finale, he expresses his love for Blubs.

=== Robert Valentino ===
Robert Stacey "Robbie" Valentino (voiced by T.J. Miller) is an emo rock music-loving teenager who is Dipper's primary rival for Wendy's affections. He has a cynical attitude toward most people, and though he seems to genuinely care for Wendy, he is still sometimes inconsiderate, such as neglecting to listen to her while playing a video game in "Fight Fighters". Robbie and Wendy are a couple until "Boyz Crazy", in which Dipper informs Wendy that the song Robbie wrote for her has a backmasked mind-controlling message, although Wendy is most upset that the song was not written for her. After the breakup, Robbie becomes depressed at losing her, though his attempts to win her back cause her to be annoyed at him. In "The Love God", Robbie begins a relationship with Tambry due to Mabel matchmaking them via a love potion to cheer Robbie up, but their relationship continues even after its effects wear off. His parents are both undertakers, though their personalities are the polar opposite of their son's, possibly due to their work with the dead. In "Weirdmageddon Part 1", Robbie is among the citizens of Gravity falls who are captured and petrified by Bill's minions. He is rescued in "Weirdmageddon Part 3", and continues to aid in his family's business.

=== Buddy Gleeful ===
Buddy "Bud" Gleeful (voiced by Stephen Root) is Li'l Gideon's polite and well-meaning father. Despite the problems within his family, he finds ways to make money, even to the point of becoming allies with Grunkle Stan for a business deal. Besides working at Li'l Gideon's "Tent of Telepathy", Bud also sells used cars. He was also a member of the Society of the Blind Eye and was seen in the past in the episode "Blendin's Game", pushing a stroller with Gideon in it. In "The Stanchurian Candidate", he unsuccessfully runs for mayor of Gravity Falls, mostly because Li'l Gideon forced him to so he could get him out of jail. He makes two brief appearances in the series finale: he is first seen using Gideon plushies to make a fire, then as a guest at Dipper and Mabel's birthday party.

=== Preston and Priscilla ===
Preston and Priscilla (voiced by Nathan Fillion and Kari Wahlgren) are Pacifica Northwest's wealthy and snobby parents who have a hatred of the common folk of the town. Preston places heavy stress on Pacifica to ensure she maintains their family's image of perfection. In "Weirdmageddon Part 1", Preston is the first citizen in Gravity Falls to be victimized by Bill. He attempts to become one of Bill's minions, only for Bill to switch around his facial features. "Weirdmageddon Part 3" reveals that both Preston and Priscilla were petrified by Bill's minions, but they are later restored to normal. However, they also go broke due to Preston investing all of his money towards Bill and his "weirdness bonds", and at the end of the series, they are forced to sell their mansion to keep their wealth, which Fiddleford McGucket buys. Gravity Falls: Lost Legends reveals that Priscilla is a trophy wife, as Preston won her in a yachting competition.

=== Agent Powers and Agent Trigger ===
Agent Powers and Agent Trigger (voiced by Nick Offerman and Brad Abrell) are agents of the U.S. government, who were went to Gravity Falls to investigate paranormal activity in the area. After Dipper raises the dead, the two are seen dragged off by zombies into a ditch. They later reappear at the end of the episode, sure that Gravity Falls is the town they are looking for. In many episodes, they are secretly watching the Pines family, such as is "Sock Opera" and the after credits of "Northwest Mansion Mystery", where they discuss a power surge they measured during the party. They appear again in "Not What He Seems", where they arrest Grunkle Stan over suspicions that he is building a doomsday weapon. At the end of "A Tale of Two Stans", they, along with the rest of the government agents in their team investing in the Mystery Shack, lose their memories of the portal after Stanford uses the Memory Gun on them.

=== Tambry ===
Tambry (voiced by Jessica DiCicco) is one of Wendy's friends. She has dyed hair and is often seen using her phone. As of "The Love God", she is in a relationship with Robbie. In "Weirdmageddon Part 1", she is among the citizens of Gravity Falls captured and petrified by Bill's minions, but is later restored to normal.

=== Lee and Nate ===
Lee (voiced by Mike Rianda) and Nate (voiced by Alex Hirsch) are Wendy's friends, who are usually seen together. Lee has blonde hair and wears a red shirt, while Nate wears a cap and a black shirt. They both act like stereotypical, sarcastic teenagers. In "Weirdmageddon Part 1", they are among the citizens of Gravity Falls captured and petrified by Bill's minions, but are later restored to normal.

=== Thompson ===
Thompson (voiced by Mike Rianda) is one of Wendy's friends, who is usually seen participating in the games the guys play. In "Weirdmageddon Part 1", he is among the citizens captured and petrified by Bill's minions, but is later restored to normal

=== Susan Wentworth ===
"Lazy" Susan Wentworth (voiced by Jennifer Coolidge) is a waitress at Greasy's Diner. She is shown to love fixing things, despite not being skilled. Her name is a pun on her lazy eye, as well as a kitchen device she was trying to fix. She has several cats, three of which are named Donald, Sandy, and Mr. Cat-Face. Grunkle Stan had a crush on her and, with Mabel's help, eventually works up the nerve to win her over, but regrets it after she calls him repeatedly to leave voice messages. She is shown to be scatterbrained in "Summerween", when she fails to guess what costumes Soos, Mabel, and Mabel's friends wear. "A Tale of Two Stans" reveals her constantly closed eye was caused by her accidentally touching one of Ford's inventions during the first Mystery Shack tour.

=== Tobias Determined ===
Tobias "Toby" Determined (voiced by Gregg Turkington) is a journalist for the Gravity Falls Gossiper, which he is seemingly the only employee of. He is also a member of the Society of the Blind Eye. Despite this, he is shown to be terrible at his job. He has an unrequited crush on local TV news reporter Shandra Jimenez, to the extent that he has a cardboard cutout of her in his closet and flirts with it when alone, as shown in "Headhunters". A running gag is that he is often mistaken for a monster due to his face, as shown when Wendy shoots him with an arrow in "Weirdmageddon Part 1". He finally gets to work with Shandra Jimenez after Weirdmageddon, after which he starts wearing punk clothes and adopts the name "Bodacious T". His name is a pun on "to be determined", said when information in a news story is unavailable.

=== Sir Lord Quentin Trembley III Esquire ===
Sir Lord Quentin Trembley III Esquire (voiced by Alex Hirsch) is the eighth-and-a-half President of the United States, who never finished his term. After winning the 1837 election due to a literal landslide killing the opposition, he quickly became known for being the silliest president in the United States, as he waged war on pancakes, legalized marriage with woodpeckers, appointed six babies to the Supreme Court, issued the de-pantsipation proclamation, and declared in his State of the Union address, "The only thing we have to fear is gigantic, man-eating spiders!", a reference to Franklin D. Roosevelt's speech during his first inauguration. His likeness is used on the fictional negative twelve dollar bill, which he describes as being "Less than worthless." Trembley is the true founder of Gravity Falls (having found the land while riding a horse backwards off a cliff), but was replaced by Pacifica's ancestor Nathaniel Northwest due to being seen as an embarrassment. Dipper and Mabel later find him preserved in peanut brittle while on their way to Washington D.C. after being captured by Blubs and Durland. After being freed, he gave Dipper his President's Key, which can open any lock in America made before 1877, and makes Mabel a US congresswoman before leaving.

=== Blendin Blenjamin Blandin ===
Blendin Blenjamin Blandin (voiced by Justin Roiland) is a time traveler from the year 207̃012, who was sent back in time to Gravity Falls to remove a set of time anomalies that Mabel and Dipper assume they started. In the episode "Blendin's Game", he competes with Dipper and Mabel in a game called "Globnar" to get revenge on them for getting him arrested by way of a "time wish", allowing one paradox-free wish to the holder, but loses the final game of laser tag. It is suggested that he will no longer be a villain after "Blendin's Game", where Dipper and Mabel help him get his job back. In "Dipper and Mabel vs. the Future", Bill Cipher possesses him so that he can release the dimensional rift. In "Weirdmageddon Part 1", upon realizing he was possessed, Blandin goes to gain help from his fellow time travelers, only for Bill to kill all of them and for Blandin to escape as the sole survivor. Journal 3 reveals that Blandin was not the sole survivor of Weirdmageddon, as he confirms that Lolph and Dundgren send out holograms during dangerous missions in place of them.

=== Time Baby ===
The Time Baby (voiced by Dave Wittenberg) is an all-powerful infant who is the ruler of the future as of the year 207̃012 and possesses ultimate control over time and space. He is also the game master of the game tournament "Globnar". His origins are mostly unknown, but it is known he was found frozen in an iceberg, which eventually melted and set him free in the future.

=== Daniel Corduroy ===
Daniel "Manly Dan" Corduroy (voiced by John DiMaggio) is a lumberjack and father of Wendy and the three Corduroy Boys. He is unstable and has serious anger issues, but enjoys family bonding activities such as fishing on the lake. He hangs out at Skull Fracture, a local biker joint in downtown Gravity Falls, and is also good friends with Tyler Cutebiker.

=== Tyler Cutebiker ===
Tyler Cutebiker (voiced by Will Forte) is a slim, well-groomed biker. He appears to be rather childlike and effeminate, and he is well known for showing up in crowd scenes saying, "Get 'em! Get 'em!" He describes himself as an "enthusiasm enthusiast". He tends to be indecisive and frequently visits the Mystery Shack. In "The Stanchurian Candidate", he is elected mayor of Gravity Falls due to being the only candidate to fill in his paperwork, Stan's massive list of petty crimes that led to him being disqualified, and Buddy Gleeful being exposed to only be running so that he can get Li'l Gideon out of prison. In the series finale, he is among the citizens of Gravity Falls petrified by Bill's minions and is used to build a throne for Bill, but is later restored to normal. At the end of the series, he passes the "Never Mind All That" Act, telling the townspeople that all questions about Weirdmaggedon should be answered with "Never mind all that!" or else they get tasered.

=== Shandra Jiminez ===
Shandra Jimenez (voiced by Kari Wahlgren) is the local news reporter in Gravity Falls, who Toby Determined secretly has a crush on. It appears she takes her job seriously, as she refers to herself as "a real reporter" in "Headhunters".

=== Tate McGucket ===
Tate McGucket (voiced by Alex Hirsch) is a stoic worker at Lake Gravity Falls and son of Old Man McGucket, whom he has a troubled relationship with. His eyes are always hidden under his hat. Following Weirdmaggeddon, he moves into Northwest Mansion with his father.

== Minor characters ==
=== Xyler and Craz ===
Xyler (voiced by John Roberts) and Craz (voiced by Greg Cipes) are the main characters of Mabel's favorite movie, the 1990s cult comedy Dream Boy High. They come to life numerous times during the show, most notably accompanying the group in "Dreamscaperers" and serving as her associates in "Weirdmageddon 2: Escape from Reality".

=== The Corduroy Boys ===
The Corduroy Boys are Manly Dan's three sons and Wendy's younger brothers. They are often seen along with Dan destroying things.

=== Archibald Corduroy ===
Archibald Corduroy (voiced by Kevin Michael Richardson) was an ancestor of the Corduroy family who oversaw the construction the Northwests' manor. Despite their service, Archibald and his workers were denied entry to manor's inauguration, which coincided with the Great Flood of 1863 (a reference to the Great Flood of 1862); without shelter, Archibald and his lumberjacks were killed. Archibald's vengeful spirit vowed the death of the Northwests should they continue to deny the common folk of Gravity Falls access to Northwest Manor; 150 years after the inauguration, his ghost haunts the mansion during the annual Northwest Fest until Pacifica appeases him by opening the celebration to the public.

=== Free Pizza Guy ===
The Free Pizza Guy is a background character who is usually seen eating pizza and is disappointed when Stan breaks his promise of free pizza in "Headhunters". He is most recognizable by his red 'free pizza' shirt. Dipper and Mabel also know him as "That Fat Guy".

=== Mr. Poolcheck ===
Mr. Poolcheck (voiced by Mike Rianda) is the head lifeguard at the Gravity Falls Pool, who acts like a stereotypical military drill instructor. He appears in "The Deep End" and briefly in "Bottomless Pit" and "Scary-oke". In "The Deep End", he is shown to be Wendy's boss at the Gravity Falls Pool and later agrees to hire Dipper. At first, he takes a liking to Dipper but comes to realize both Wendy and Dipper do not take the job of lifeguard seriously, and fires them.

=== Melody ===
Melody (voiced by Jillian Bell) is Soos' long-distance girlfriend from Portland, Oregon, who works at a "Meat Cute" food stand when in town. In the series finale, she begins working as the Mystery Shack's new cashier after Stan promotes Soos to manager.

=== Mrs. Gleeful ===
Mrs. Gleeful (voiced by Grey DeLisle) is L'il Gideon Gleeful's mother and Bud Gleeful's wife. Gideon seems to have reduced her to a traumatized, nervous wreck.

=== Pacifica's friends ===
Pacifica's friends (girl with magenta hair voiced by Ariel Hirsch) are the unnamed cronies of Pacifica, who are usually seen following her around. One of them is named Tiffany.

=== Reginald and Rosanna ===
Reginald (voiced by Will Friedle) and Rosanna (voiced by Grey DeLisle) are a proposed couple who commonly appear as background characters. They appear to be currently going out, as they are often seen together.

=== Shmipper and Smabble ===
Shmipper and Smabble are two young characters (one male and one female) who are sometimes used as complete opposites of Mabel and Dipper. They have a grandpa who shows loving affection towards them, in contrast to Grunkle Stan.

=== Tad Strange ===
Tad Strange (voiced by Cecil Baldwin) is a normal, well-adjusted man who acts as a foil for the town's strange and quirky residents.

=== Mayor Eustace Befufftlefumpter ===
Mayor Eustace "Huckabone" Befufftlefumpter (voiced by Alex Hirsch) is the reclusive 102-year-old mayor of Gravity Falls, who is introduced in "Northwest Mansion Mystery". He dies in "The Stanchurian Candidate" and is ultimately succeeded by Tyler while his zombified corpse makes a cameo in the series finale.

=== Lolph and Dundgren ===
Lolph (voiced by Dave Wittenberg) and Dundgren (voiced by Diedrich Bader) are agents of the Time Paradox Avoidance Enforcement Squadron, also known as the Time Police. Their names and possibly their tall and muscular appearance are seemingly inspired by Dolph Lundgren. They arrest Blendin Blandin and later apprehend Dipper and Mabel to compete against Blandin in Globnar. Bill Cipher kills them during Weirdmageddon, although a coded message in the book Gravity Falls: Journal 3 implies they sent holo-projections from the future for the mission and are still alive.

=== Rumble McSkirmish ===
Rumble McSkirmish (voiced by Brian Bloom) is a famous fighter in the video game "Fight Fighters". He is a reference to fighting games, particularly Street Fighter. He appears in "Fight Fighters", where he is summoned by Dipper to scare Robbie, who tries to kill as a result of confusion surrounding Dipper's father. He later fights with Dipper and wins, but disappears afterward and returns to his game. Later, he reappears as a cameo in "Soos and the Real Girl", where he appears in the arcade in his video game but is zapped by Giffany. He later returns in "Weirdmageddon Part 1", where he is released again from his video game by Bill Cipher. He returns in "Weirdmageddon 3: Take Back The Falls", where he helps the Pines family fight the Weirdmageddon monsters. After Bill Cipher's demise, he disappears and returns to his video game. Rumble McSkirmish is animated by Paul Robertson.

=== Experiment #210/The Shape Shifter ===
Experiment #210/The Shape Shifter (voiced by Mark Hamill) is a monstrous creature that seemingly comes from space. In "Dipper and Mabel vs. the Future", the strange writing in the spaceship, when decoded, says, “Specimen has escaped is changing forms”. This implies that the shapeshifter was originally on the ship, but escaped and laid an egg on earth, which Ford later found and raised. After escaping from his cryogenic chamber, he takes the form of a man that promoted canned beans. After meeting Wendy and Dipper, he steals Journal 3 and tries to escape with them, but is ultimately locked in the cryogenic chamber by Dipper, Wendy, Soos, and Mabel. Journal 3 reveals that Ford originally kept the Shapeshifter as a test subject for the cryogenic freezing device, but grew attached to it and kept it as a pet, naming it "Shifty". He was eventually forced to freeze it after his attempts to get the Journals escalated to attacking and impersonating Fiddleford.

=== Giffany ===
Giffany (or ".GIFfany") (voiced by Jessica DiCicco) is a sentient, malicious A.I. who is the main character of the dating simulator Romance Academy 7 and appears as a pink-haired schoolgirl. She killed her creator following her "birth" after he realized she was evil. Her game was returned to the local video game store several times, presumably after people found out she was dangerous. However, Soos later buys her video game and falls for her. After Dipper and Mabel pull Soos from her game, she follows Soos to the mall via power lines. However, after Soos meets Melody, Giffany reveals her jealous, controlling attitude, forcing Soos to pause her game. However, she snaps and begins stalking Soos, following him to the mall again and threatening to kill Melody. She takes control of the robotic bodies of the animatronics in Hoo-Ha Owl's Pizzamatronic Jamboree in an attempt to capture Soos and download his brain into her game, but Soos uses a pizza oven to destroy the disc, erasing her programming and killing her. However, Journal 3 reveals she survived and is trapped in the Fight Fighters arcade game, having since entered and pursued a romantic relationship with Rumble McSkirmish. They later broke up because Rumble Mcskirmish has commitment issues. As of now, she is in a non-canon romantic relationship with Senpai from Friday Night Funkin'. She was partially inspired by Ben Drowned and served as a primary inspiration for Monika. Both Rumble McSkirmish and Giffany are animated by Paul Robertson in all of their appearances.

=== Celestabellabethabelle ===
Celestabellabethabelle (voiced by Sam Marin) is a unicorn who lives in the Enchanted Forest. She first appears in "The Last Mabelcorn", where Mabel, Candy, Wendy, and Grenda fight her for her magical hair, which the Pines family needed to create a protective barrier around the Mystery Shack to protect it from Bill Cipher.

=== Summerween Trickster ===
Summerween Trickster (voiced by Jeff Bennett) is an evil monster formed by ugly Halloween candies. He tried to kill Mabel, Dipper, Soos, Candy, and Grenda after Dipper takes him off from the Mystery Shack. Later, in a store, he eats Soos, only for him to kill him by eating his heart. However, before the Trickster dies, Soos mentions that he is delicious for the happiness of the Trickster.

=== Dipper Clones ===
The Dipper Clones (all voiced by Jason Ritter) are evil clones of Dipper. In "Double Dipper", Dipper makes them from a magical copy machine he found inside the shack to assist him in his plan to dance with Wendy at a party, starting with the "number 2 clone" Tyrone. One of them was printed during a paper jam. They all team up and try to lock Dipper in a closet after he ruins their plans to dance with Wendy, but are eventually melted by water, with Tyrone being melted by the soda. In "Weirdmageddon 3: Take Back The Falls", the end credits reveal that 3 and 4 are the only clones to have survived. Journal 3 shows that shortly after "Double Dipper", they hid in Dipper's closet and made plans to replace him, but Dipper discovered them and unintentionally scared them off with an opened can of Pitt Cola. It was also revealed that 3 and 4 were given the names Tracey and Quattro.

=== Jeffy Fresh, Byrone, and Rosie ===
Jeffy Fresh, Byrone, and Rosie are a group of rebellious teenagers from the 1980s responsible for the deaths of Ma and Pa Duskerton and the creation of the Summerween Trickster. Pinequest implies that the Summerween Trickster killed them, and their gravestones appear in the game.

=== Ma and Pa Duskerton ===
Ma (voiced by April Winchell) and Pa Duskerton (voiced by Ken Jenkins) were the elderly proprietors of the "Dusk 2 Dawn" convenience store prior to their deaths caused by teenagers playing rap music, after which they became ghosts seeking vengeance on teenagers who enter the store. They used their mysterious powers to close the store and give the teenagers ironic punishments, and later possess Mabel. After Dipper concludes they were haunting them for making things that teenagers usually do, he declares he is not a teen. Upon hearing Dipper's revelation, Ma and Pa release Mabel's body and allow Dipper to exit the store. However, Dipper asks them if there was something he could do to release Wendy and her friends, as they were also his friends. In turn, Pa asks Dipper if he can perform some nice dancing, so Dipper dances the Lamby Lamby Dance to free his friends. Ma and Pa Duskerton thank Dipper for his performance and release Wendy's friends before disappearing.

=== Sev'ral Timez ===
Sev'ral Timez (voiced by Lance Bass, Matt Chapman, and Alex Hirsch) are a boy band that Mabel, Candy, and Grenda are obsessed with, which includes members Creggy G., Greggy C., Leggy P., Chubby Z., and Deep Chris. In "Boyz Crazy", Mabel and her friends discover that Sev'ral Timez are clones who live in a cage and were genetically engineered by Ergman Bratsman to be the perfect band. The band escapes captivity with help from Mabel and her friends, and are taken to her house for their safety; however, Mabel gradually succumbs to the urge to keep them locked up. She is ultimately convinced to set them free after they flee into the woods. They return in the second season, as in "Love God", they are shown behind a trashcan and as ghosts of Mabel's past loves. In "Weirdmageddon 2: Escape From Reality", they ride a scooter through Mabeland. In "Weirdmageddon 3: Take Back the Falls", they are a part of Stan's refugee group and help to power the Shacktron by running on a treadmill.

=== Mermando ===
Mermando (voiced by Matt Chapman) is a Spanish-accented merman from the Gulf of Mexico who, after being taken from his family, resides in Gravity Falls public pool. In "The Deep End", Mabel meets him and they develop feelings for each other. Together, she and Dipper help him return to the open sea. "Society of the Blind Eye" shows that he has since reluctantly become betrothed to a manatee princess.

=== Ivan Wexler ===
"Blind" Ivan Wexler (voiced by Peter Serafinowicz) is the leader of the Blind Eye Society succeeding McGucket, who is notable for having phrenological tattoos on his head.

=== Darlene ===
Darlene (voiced by Chelsea Peretti) is a spider disguised as a woman who lures men that visit her tourist attraction Mystery Mountain and traps them in cocoons to eat them. She is the main antagonist of "Roadside Attraction", as she seduces Stan with the intention of capturing him and eating him alive. However, Stan is freed by Dipper, Mabel, Candy, and Grenda. They flee via a gondola lift, pursued by Darlene. After Candy pulls a lever that sends the gondola falling out of the sky, Darlene falls from the lift and is trapped underneath the boot of a giant statue. Darlene tries to seduce Grunkle Stan again by shifting into her human form, but when he gets up close, she attempts to eat him. Darlene smugly states that she will never run out of prey because there will always be foolish men like him.

=== Undead ===
The Undead constitute Gravity Falls' various deceased that have risen on several occasions, buried on the grounds of the Gravity Falls Cemetery and the Mystery Shack. In "Tourist Trapped", Dipper mistakenly suspects the gnomes in their clumsy human disguise "Norman" to be a zombie. In "Scary-oke", Dipper invokes the undead convince the then-skeptical Agents Power and Trigger of Gravity Falls' supernatural phenomena, causing a horde of undead to attack the Mystery Shack; Journal 3 identifies these zombies as lumberjacks killed in the Great Flood of 1863. In The Book of Bill, Ford is confronted by Bill who is possessing several corpses buried at the cemetery, which Ford calls Zom-Bills.
