= Gravity Falls season 1 =

Gravity Falls
- Season 1
- Promotional poster
- Showrunner: Alex Hirsch
- Starring: Jason Ritter; Kristen Schaal; Alex Hirsch; Linda Cardellini
- No. of episodes: 20

Release
- Original network: Disney Channel
- Original release: June 15, 2012 – August 2, 2013

Season chronology
- Next → Season 2

The first season of the American animated mystery comedy television series Gravity Falls premiered on Disney Channel on June 15, 2012, and ended on August 2, 2013. The season contains 20 episodes.

== Development ==
=== Premise and plot ===
The season revolves around the various antics of two fraternal twins, Dipper and Mabel Pines, who were handed over to their Great Uncle (or "Grunkle") Stan, who runs a tourist trap called The Mystery Shack, in the town of Gravity Falls, Oregon. They soon realize that the town holds many secrets, and when Dipper obtains a book that he finds in the magical land he's transported to, he and Mabel find their everyday life changes. Alongside them in their antics are Soos Ramirez and Wendy Corduroy, who work for The Mystery Shack, the latter of whom Dipper has a crush on.

Growing up, series creator Alex Hirsch was inspired by Twin Peaks and The X Files, and animated sitcoms like The Simpsons, where he observed that "animation could be funnier than live-action. That animation didn't have to just be for kids. That it could be satirical and observational and grounded in a sense of character interaction". This way, the show could be readily enjoyably by children and adults alike. Hirsch graduated from the California Institute of the Arts, and was hired to work as writer and storyboard artist for the Cartoon Network series The Marvelous Misadventures of Flapjack, where he was paired up with Pendleton Ward, the creator of Adventure Time. Afterwards, he moved on to co-develop the Disney Channel animated series Fish Hooks, shortly before he pitched (and was subsequently green-lit) Gravity Falls.

=== Production ===
Hirsch explained in an interview with The A.V. Club during production of season 1, that a typical episode is conceived in a room reserved for writers, where a simple synopsis is presented, and from then on dramatic structure is defined, and the plot is modified to include a character-driven subplot, which Hirsch expresses as "the hardest thing... to find a character story that actually uncovers, explores, or pushes tension – on something our characters care about – that is properly explored via the magic or monster or impossibility of the week."

B- and A-stories are created, and are given to a writer to produce an outline, which is then subsequently checked-off by Hirsch for feedback. The writer produces a draft from these edits, where more notes may be given. Hirsch states that he and creative director Mike Rianda may personally create a draft for themselves before a final script is produced, in which the dialogue from the draft received from the writer is majorly revised; Hirsch states that the revising process "is not a discredit to our writers – it's just we have a very particular vision. In particular, I usually rewrite almost all of Dipper's dialogue and most of Mabel's dialogue, just because I have them in my head. Me and Mike will stay up for about 48 hours prior to the delivery of every script. We'll take the weekend, we'll work all night, we'll drink Red Bull, we'll sleep on the couch in shifts like maniacs, we'll slap each other in the face".

A script is delivered, which then gets translated into a storyboard, where feedback is received from Hirsch and Rianda to the board artists if a certain element, such as a gag, doesn't work. Afterwards, a pitch for the episode is given to the network, where they do a read-through, and then the episode is either checked out by the network, or retooled in the small amount of time allocated before an animation studio must receive something to work with.

== Cast ==
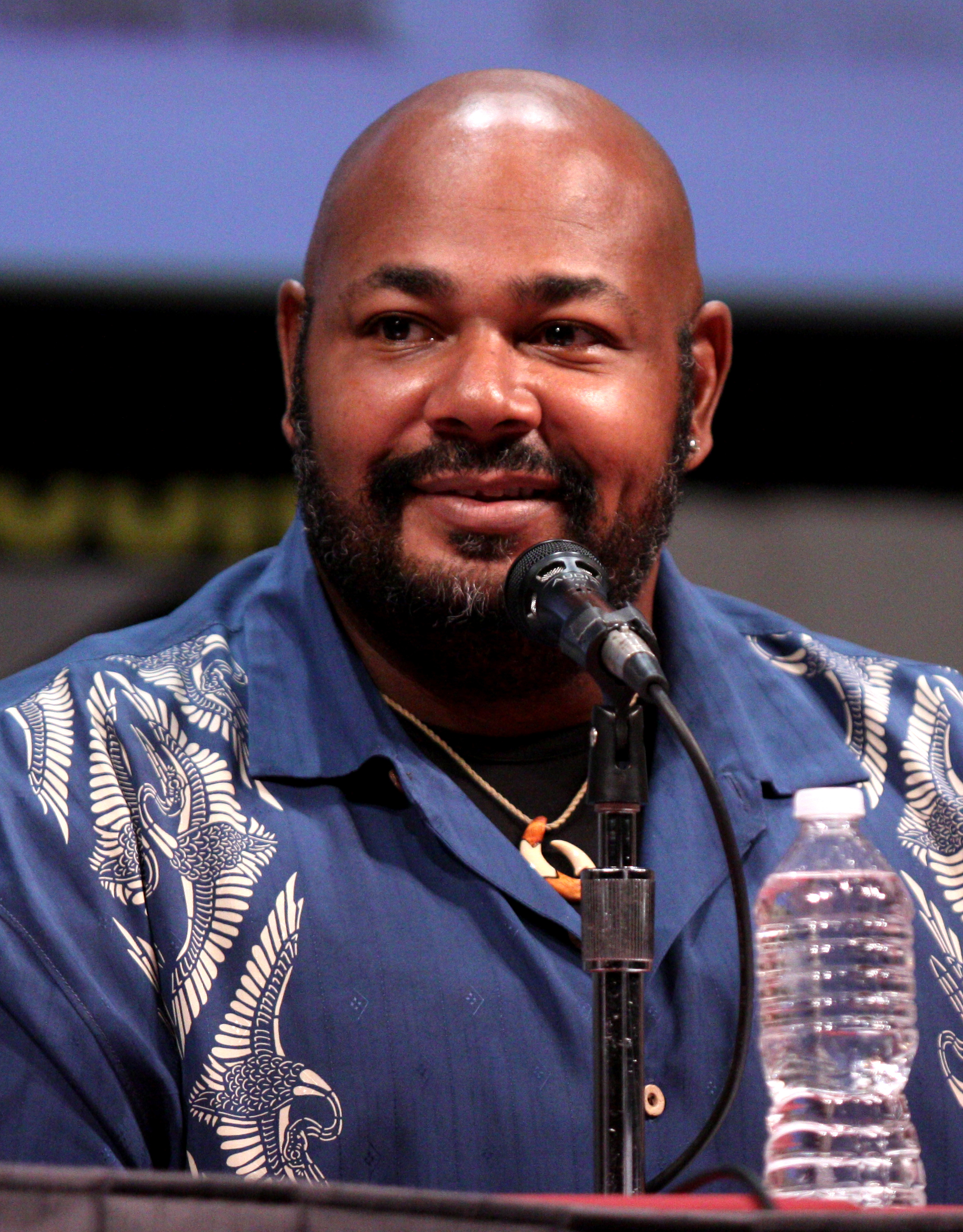
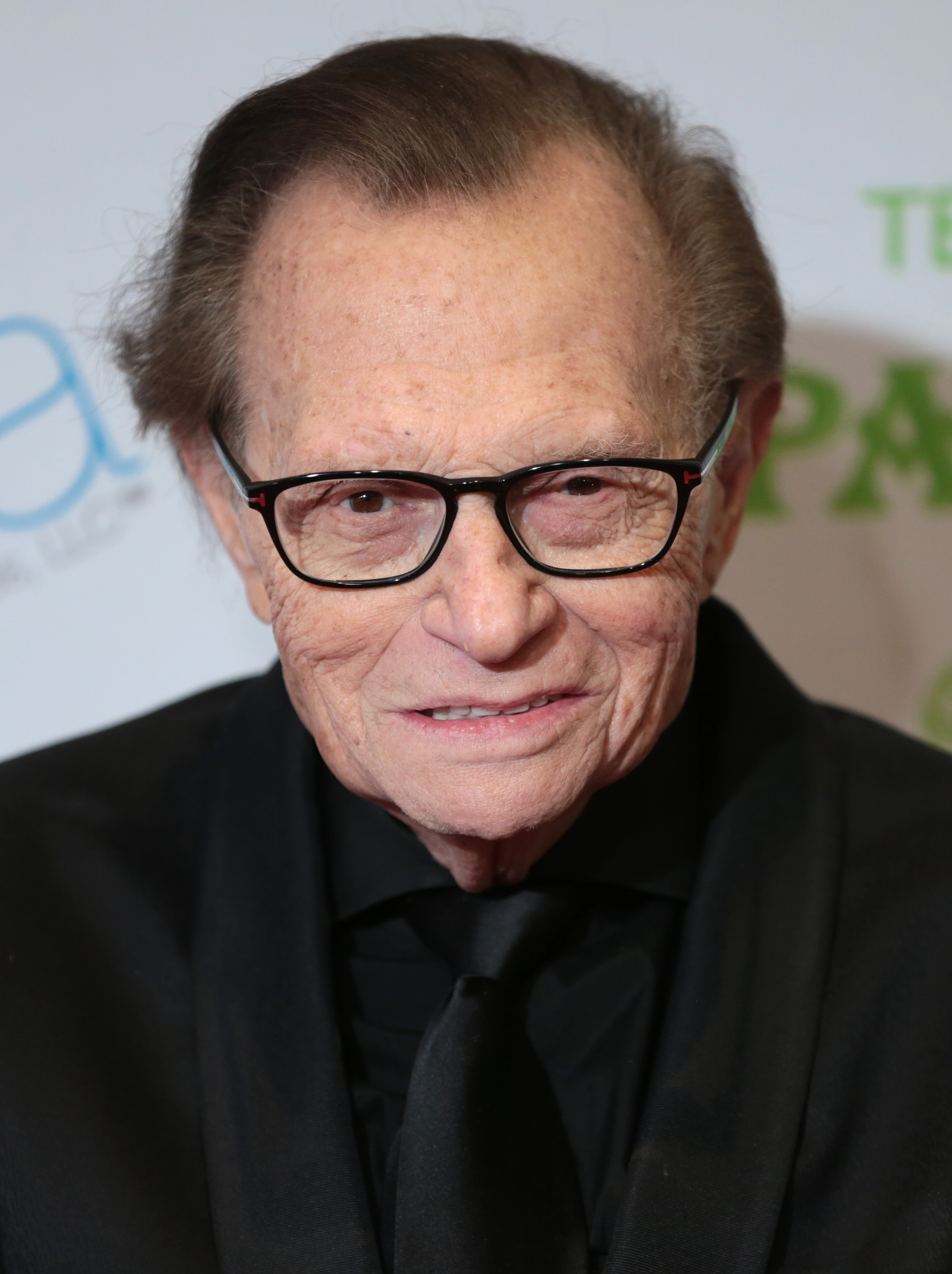
This season employs the likes of voice acting veteran Kevin Michael Richardson (left), who voices the character Sheriff Blubs, and has guest starred well-known figures, such as Larry King (right)

The main characters comprises the voices of Jason Ritter as Dipper and Kristen Schaal as Mabel, with series creator Alex Hirsch portraying Grunkle Stan and Soos, and Wendy Corduroy played by Linda Cardellini. Hirsch stated in an interview, tongue-in-cheek, on the role of Mabel that he "knew from the get-go that it's got to be [Schaal] or there's no show. I would've just stopped working. If we hadn't gotten her, I would have probably quit".

The recurring characters comprises the voices of Dee Bradley Baker as Mabel's pet pig, Waddles, and Hirsch also playing Old Man McGucket, the "local kook" of the town, and Bill Cipher, an interdimensional demon. Kevin Michael Richardson plays Sheriff Blubs, with partner Deputy Durland being voiced by Keith Ferguson. Voice acting veteran John DiMaggio plays Manly Dan, a strong lumberjack and father of Wendy. Mike Rianda plays Lee and Thomson. Niki Yang plays Candy Chiu and Carl Faruolo plays Grenda, two of Mabel's best friends. Toby Determined, a journalist for Gravity Falls' Gossiper, is voiced by Gregg Turkington, and Will Forte plays Tyler Cutebiker. Thurop Van Orman voices the recurring villain Li'l Gideon. Pacifica Northwest is played by Jackie Buscarino.

The series commissions various guest stars to voice characters who portray one-shot characters, or in some cases, cameos of themselves, as is the case in "Headhunters", where both Larry King and Coolio can be seen as wax sculptures of themselves. Other voices include John Oliver, who plays a wax figure of Sherlock Holmes (also featured in "Headhunters"), Alfred Molina as Multi-Bear and Jennifer Coolidge as Lazy Suzan in the episode "Dipper vs. Manliness". Justin Roiland plays a time traveler by the name of Blendin Blandin in "The Time Traveler's Pig". Brian Bloom is the voice of Rumble McSkirmish, a video game character featured in the episode "Fight Fighters". Corey Burton voices an unnamed lawyer in "Little Dipper". Jeff Bennett plays the role of The Summerween Trickster in the episode "Summerween". Matt Chapman and Mike Rianda both voice Mermando and Mr. Poolcheck respectively, in the episode "The Deep End". Lance Bass (who was one of the half members of the teen-dance pop boy band NSYNC) voices the band consisting of clones, Sev'ral Timez, in the episode "Boyz Crazy"; Matt Chapman returns to voice some members of the band. Greg Cipes and John Roberts voice Craz and Xyler, characters from the fictional film "Dream Boy High" in the episode "Dreamscaperers".

== Broadcast ==
Internationally, Season 1 was broadcast in Canada via Disney XD with some numbering alterations reflecting the production codes: "Headhunters" is counted 2 instead of 3 and "The Inconveniencing" is counted 3 instead of 5.

== Episodes ==
- Production codes for this season start with the string 618G-1 (the first three numbers numerically represent the birth month and date of series creator Alex Hirsch), with the last two numbers representing the order the episodes were produced in, which may not represent the order in which they air.
- Episode 19 has been released on different platforms under two names: "Dreamscaperers" and "Dreamscapers".

No. overall	No. in season	Title	Directed by	Written by	Original release date	Prod. code	U.S. viewers (millions)
1	1	"Tourist Trapped"	John Aoshima	Alex Hirsch	June 15, 2012	107	3.40
Two fraternal twins, Dipper and Mabel Pines, arrive at the remote town of Gravity Falls to spend their summer break with their great uncle Stan. Dipper uncovers a mysterious journal hidden in the forest, revealing the town's strange and uncanny secrets. Using this information, he tries to save Mabel from her strange new boyfriend who appears to be a zombie, but is actually something much stranger.
2	2	"The Legend of the Gobblewonker"	John Aoshima	Alex Hirsch & Mike Rianda	June 29, 2012	101	3.14
Dipper, Mabel, and Soos embark on a boating expedition to prove that a sea monster exists beneath, hoping to win a thousand dollars. Meanwhile, Stan, after being abandoned by Dipper and Mabel, tries to find fishing partners. Guest stars: Will Friedle as Reginald
3	3	"Headhunters"	John Aoshima	Alex Hirsch & Aury Wallington	June 30, 2012	103	2.71
Mabel sculpts a life-sized wax sculpture of Stan to add to his collection of wax museum figures, but when the wax figure's head goes missing, the twins are on the case. Guest stars: John Oliver as Wax Sherlock Holmes, Larry King as Wax Larry King, Coolio as Wax Coolio, and Greg Ellis as Wax William Shakespeare
4	4	"The Hand That Rocks the Mabel"	John Aoshima	Alex Hirsch & Zach Paez	July 6, 2012	105	2.95
Dipper and Mabel meet an intriguing new neighbor: the town's local psychic child, Li'l Gideon. When Gideon begins obsessing over Mabel and tries to win her over, Dipper tries to stop him, ensuing his wrath and psychic abilities.
5	5	"The Inconveniencing"	Joe Pitt & Aaron Springer	Alex Hirsch & Mike Rianda	July 13, 2012	104	3.55
Dipper attempts to woo Wendy by lying about his age. While hanging out with Wendy and her friends, the kids end up in an old, abandoned convenience store that is seemingly haunted. Guest stars: Ken Jenkins as Pa Duskerton and April Winchell as Ma Duskerton
6	6	"Dipper vs. Manliness"	Joe Pitt & Aaron Springer	Tim McKeon	July 20, 2012	106	3.14
When Dipper wants to become more "manly", he wanders into the forest on an epic quest and meets a strange species known as the "Manataurs" that teach him the ways of their masculinity. Meanwhile, Mabel tries to get Stan to impress Lazy Susan. Guest star: Alfred Molina as The Multi-Bear
7	7	"Double Dipper"	Joe Pitt & Aaron Springer	Story by : Mitch Larson; Teleplay by : Alex Hirsch, Tim McKeon & Mike Rianda	August 10, 2012	108	4.18
Stan throws a party at the Mystery Shack; while Dipper produces clones of himself to help him impress Wendy, Mabel faces off against her new rival Pacifica Northwest in a karaoke battle.
8	8	"Irrational Treasure"	John Aoshima	Story by : David Slack; Teleplay by : Alex Hirsch & Tim McKeon	August 17, 2012	110	3.87
On the annual Pioneer Day at Gravity Falls, the kids discover that the town's founder, Nathaniel Northwest, was a fraud and a hoax, so they set out to expose the truth. However, they are pursued by Sheriff Blubs and Deputy Durland who attempt to stop the secret from being revealed. Guest star: Tara Strong as Sue
9	9	"The Time Traveler's Pig"	Joe Pitt & Aaron Springer	Alex Hirsch & Aury Wallington	August 24, 2012	109	4.14
Dipper and Mabel encounter a time traveler named Blendin at the town fair. After failing to win Wendy over, Dipper steals Blendin's time machine to undo his mistake, while Mabel accompanies him to continue winning her pig, Waddles. Guest star: Justin Roiland as Blendin Blandin
10	10	"Fight Fighters"	John Aoshima	Alex Hirsch & Zach Paez	September 14, 2012	111	2.94
Dipper inadvertently picks a fight with Robbie, so he brings a video game character, Rumble McSkirmish, to life to fight for him. Meanwhile, Mabel tries to end Stan's fear of heights. Guest star: Brian Bloom as Rumble McSkirmish
11	11	"Little Dipper"	Joe Pitt & Aaron Springer	Alex Hirsch, Tim McKeon & Zach Paez	September 28, 2012	102	2.60
Feeling insecure that Mabel is becoming the alpha twin, Dipper seeks a magical crystal to grow taller. But when Gideon finds the crystal, he uses it to shrink the kids, capturing them and tries to use it on Stan to take over the Mystery Shack.
12	12	"Summerween"	John Aoshima	Alex Hirsch, Zach Paez & Mike Rianda	October 5, 2012	114	3.48
The people of Gravity Falls love Halloween so much that they also celebrate it in summer, with jack-o'-melons and much trick-or-treating. Dipper and Mabel are excited to join in on the fun, but when Wendy casually mentions that trick-or-treating is for kids, Dipper's outlook on the evening changes. The night gets even more complicated when a monster that Dipper accidentally insulted makes them fulfill his candy quota by the night's end, or else he will eat them. Guest star: Jeff Bennett as The Summerween Trickster
13	13	"Boss Mabel"	John Aoshima	Story by : Tommy Reahard; Teleplay by : Alex Hirsch & Tim McKeon	February 15, 2013	115	3.45
Mabel bets Grunkle Stan that she will make more money at the Mystery Shack by treating people nicely than he does by being rude and cranky. He heads off to win a fortune on a TV game show, while she deals with lazy employees and a real monster captured by Dipper.
14	14	"Bottomless Pit!"	Joe Pitt & Aaron Springer	Alex Hirsch & Mike Rianda	March 1, 2013	113	3.10
As Dipper, Mabel, Stan, and Soos fall into a seemingly bottomless pit, they tell each other stories to pass time.: Voice Over: Dipper is annoyed by everyone making fun of his voice, so changes it with a potion given to him by McGucket.; Soos' Really Great Pinball Story: Soos cheats at a pinball game to win the high score, and it retaliates by sucking him, Dipper, and Mabel inside.; Grunkle Stan Wins the Football Bowl: Grunkle Stan scores the winning touchdown of an American football game, earning him the admiration of the team.; Trooth Ache: Mabel is tired of Stan's constant lies, so gives him a false set of teeth that force him to always tell the truth.
15	15	"The Deep End"	Joe Pitt & Aaron Springer	Nancy Cohen	March 15, 2013	112	4.50
Mabel befriends a cute merman trapped in the deep end of the public pool, and is determined to return him to his family in the ocean. Meanwhile, Dipper learns that Wendy is a lifeguard at the pool, so volunteers to spend time with her, while Stan and Gideon fight over a lawn chair.
16	16	"Carpet Diem"	Joe Pitt	Alex Hirsch, Tim McKeon & Zach Paez	April 5, 2013	117	3.36
Soos discovers a hidden room inside the Mystery Shack, and Dipper is happy to claim it as his own independent space, only for Mabel to want the room too. They both compete for Stan's approval to win the room as part of a contest, which gets even trickier when the siblings switch bodies due to the room's mysterious shag rug.
17	17	"Boyz Crazy"	John Aoshima	Matt Chapman & Alex Hirsch	April 19, 2013	119	3.16
When Mabel discovers that her favorite boy band, Sev'ral Timez, is actually a bunch of imprisoned clones, she sets them free, only to decide on keeping them for herself. Meanwhile, Dipper thinks that Robbie has brainwashed Wendy using a secret message hidden in the lyrics of one of his songs. Guest star: Lance Bass as Sev'ral Timez
18	18	"Land Before Swine"	John Aoshima	Alex Hirsch & Tim McKeon	June 28, 2013	122	3.50
A prehistoric pterosaur snatches Waddles after Grunkle Stan throws him outside, and Dipper, Mabel, Stan, Soos, and Old Man McGucket go after the beast in order to save Waddles, while also working out friendship issues between each other.
19	19	"Dreamscaperers"	John Aoshima & Joe Pitt	Matt Chapman, Alex Hirsch & Tim McKeon	July 12, 2013	120	2.70
Dipper, Mabel, and Soos travel through Grunkle Stan's mind to defeat an ancient demon named Bill Cipher, summoned by Gideon to retrieve the code to Stan's safe in a ploy to get the Mystery Shack.
20	20	"Gideon Rises"	John Aoshima & Joe Pitt	Matt Chapman, Alex Hirsch & Mike Rianda	August 2, 2013	121	3.18
Gideon swindles the Mystery Shack away from Stan, so the Pines are forced to move in with Soos and his grandmother. After being unable to sway the public from Gideon's charm, and unable to defeat him with help from the gnomes, Dipper and Mabel are sent back home. However, after Gideon gets ahold of Dipper's journal 3, realizing there is one more missing alongside his journal 2, he attacks them using a giant mech of himself. The twins defeat Gideon, and Stan exposes him as a fraud, as he is arrested, the townspeople turn against him, and the Mystery Shack is returned to the Pines. Afterwards, Stan gets his hands on the two journals, revealing he's had the first one all along, and prepares to activate a portal hidden in the shack's basement.

== Reception ==
The season received widespread acclaim from critics.

Review grades
No.	Title	Air date	The A.V. Club (A-F)
1	"Tourist Trapped"	June 15, 2012	B+
2	"The Legend of the Gobblewonker"	June 29, 2012	B+
3	"Headhunters"	June 30, 2012	B
4	"The Hand That Rocks the Mabel"	July 6, 2012	A-
5	"The Inconveniencing"	July 13, 2012	A
6	"Dipper vs. Manliness"	July 20, 2012	B+
7	"Double Dipper"	August 10, 2012	A-
8	"Irrational Treasure"	August 17, 2012	A-
9	"The Time Traveler's Pig"	August 24, 2012	B+
10	"Fight Fighters"	September 14, 2012	B
11	"Little Dipper"	September 28, 2012	A-
12	"Summerween"	October 5, 2012	A-
13	"Boss Mabel"	February 15, 2013	B+
14	"Bottomless Pit!"	March 1, 2013	A-
15	"The Deep End"	March 15, 2013	B
16	"Carpet Diem"	April 5, 2013	B
17	"Boyz Crazy"	April 19, 2013	B+
18	"Land Before Swine"	June 28, 2013	A-
19	"Dreamscaperers"	July 12, 2013	A-
20	"Gideon Rises"	August 2, 2013	A
