= List of Gravity Falls episodes =

Gravity Falls is an American animated television series created by Alex Hirsch for Disney Channel and Disney XD. The series revolves around the various antics of two fraternal twins, Dipper (voiced by Jason Ritter) and Mabel Pines (voiced by Kristen Schaal), who were sent to stay with their great-uncle (or "Grunkle") Stan (voiced by Hirsch) in the town of Gravity Falls, Oregon, for the summer. They soon realize that the town holds plenty of secrets, after Dipper comes across an old journal which documents the anomalies of the town.

A pilot for Gravity Falls was pitched to Disney Channel in 2010 which led to the series being green-lit. The series premiered on Disney Channel on June 15, 2012. On March 12, 2013, the series was renewed for a second season. However, Disney did not officially confirm the renewal until July 29. The second season premiered on August 1, 2014, on Disney Channel, and on August 4, on Disney XD. On November 20, 2015, Hirsch announced that the second season would be the series' last; the series concluded on February 15, 2016.

During the course of the series, 40 episodes of Gravity Falls aired over two seasons.

== Series overview ==
Season	Episodes	Originally released		
Season	Episodes	First released	Last released	Network
Pilot		—N/a		—N/a
1	20	June 15, 2012 (Note: The first episode of the season premiered as a series preview. The series made its official premiere on Disney Channel on June 29, 2012.)	August 2, 2013	Disney Channel
2	20 (Note: The final episode, "Weirdmageddon 3: Take Back the Falls", has sometimes been split up into two separate episodes, with the first half maintaining the original title, while the second half is titled "Weirdmageddon 4: Somewhere in the Woods". The splitting is also observed on Disney+, bringing the total episode count of the season on the streaming service to 21.)	August 1, 2014 (Note: The first episode of the season premiered on Disney Channel. The second season officially began on August 4, 2014 on Disney XD, the new network for the series.)	February 15, 2016	Disney XD

== Episodes ==
=== Pilot (2010) ===
Prior to the creation of Gravity Falls, Alex Hirsch was helping to develop the Disney Channel animated series Fish Hooks, when Disney contacted him and asked him if he would like to pitch his own animated series to the network, which Hirsch accepted. Disney commissioned Hirsch to create an eleven-minute low-budget animated pilot for Gravity Falls which he later described as "a short version of Tourist Trapped". On December 9, 2010, it was announced that Disney Channel had greenlit Gravity Falls for a full series based on the pilot, which was originally slated to premiere in spring of 2012.

The pilot was never broadcast on television and for many years Hirsch had no intention of releasing it to the public. During the Cipher Hunt in July 2016, Hirsch promised to release the pilot as a reward for completing a 2,000 piece jigsaw puzzle, which was a clue in the hunt. The puzzle was completed on August 1, 2016, and Hirsch published the pilot online on August 3.

Title	Written and directed by	Production date
"Pilot"	Alex Hirsch	2010

=== Season 1 (2012–13) ===
No. overall	No. in season	Title	Directed by	Written by	Original release date	Prod. code	U.S. viewers (millions)
1	1	"Tourist Trapped"	John Aoshima	Alex Hirsch	June 15, 2012	107	3.40
2	2	"The Legend of the Gobblewonker"	John Aoshima	Alex Hirsch & Mike Rianda	June 29, 2012	101	3.14
3	3	"Headhunters"	John Aoshima	Alex Hirsch & Aury Wallington	June 30, 2012	103	2.71
4	4	"The Hand That Rocks the Mabel"	John Aoshima	Alex Hirsch & Zach Paez	July 6, 2012	105	2.95
5	5	"The Inconveniencing"	Joe Pitt & Aaron Springer	Alex Hirsch & Mike Rianda	July 13, 2012	104	3.55
6	6	"Dipper vs. Manliness"	Joe Pitt & Aaron Springer	Tim McKeon	July 20, 2012	106	3.14
7	7	"Double Dipper"	Joe Pitt & Aaron Springer	Story by : Mitch Larson; Teleplay by : Alex Hirsch, Tim McKeon & Mike Rianda	August 10, 2012	108	4.18
8	8	"Irrational Treasure"	John Aoshima	Story by : David Slack; Teleplay by : Alex Hirsch & Tim McKeon	August 17, 2012	110	3.87
9	9	"The Time Traveler's Pig"	Joe Pitt & Aaron Springer	Alex Hirsch & Aury Wallington	August 24, 2012	109	4.14
10	10	"Fight Fighters"	John Aoshima	Alex Hirsch & Zach Paez	September 14, 2012	111	2.94
11	11	"Little Dipper"	Joe Pitt & Aaron Springer	Alex Hirsch, Tim McKeon & Zach Paez	September 28, 2012	102	2.60
12	12	"Summerween"	John Aoshima	Alex Hirsch, Zach Paez & Mike Rianda	October 5, 2012	114	3.48
13	13	"Boss Mabel"	John Aoshima	Story by : Tommy Reahard; Teleplay by : Alex Hirsch & Tim McKeon	February 15, 2013	115	3.45
14	14	"Bottomless Pit!"	Joe Pitt & Aaron Springer	Alex Hirsch & Mike Rianda	March 1, 2013	113	3.10
15	15	"The Deep End"	Joe Pitt & Aaron Springer	Nancy Cohen	March 15, 2013	112	4.50
16	16	"Carpet Diem"	Joe Pitt	Alex Hirsch, Tim McKeon & Zach Paez	April 5, 2013	117	3.36
17	17	"Boyz Crazy"	John Aoshima	Matt Chapman & Alex Hirsch	April 19, 2013	119	3.16
18	18	"Land Before Swine"	John Aoshima	Alex Hirsch & Tim McKeon	June 28, 2013	122	3.50
19	19	"Dreamscaperers"	John Aoshima & Joe Pitt	Matt Chapman, Alex Hirsch & Tim McKeon	July 12, 2013	120	2.70
20	20	"Gideon Rises"	John Aoshima & Joe Pitt	Matt Chapman, Alex Hirsch & Mike Rianda	August 2, 2013	121	3.18

=== Season 2 (2014–16) ===
No. overall	No. in season	Title	Directed by	Written by	Original release date	Prod. code	U.S. viewers (millions)
21	1	"Scary-oke"	Rob Renzetti	Matt Chapman, Alex Hirsch & Jeff Rowe	August 1, 2014 (Note: This episode premiered on Disney Channel prior to Disney XD. The episode premiered on Disney XD on August 4, 2014.)	202	2.37
22	2	"Into the Bunker"	Joe Pitt	Matt Chapman & Alex Hirsch	August 4, 2014	201	0.94
23	3	"The Golf War"	Matt Braly	Alex Hirsch & Jeff Rowe	August 11, 2014	203	1.27
24	4	"Sock Opera"	Matt Braly & Joe Pitt	Alex Hirsch & Shion Takeuchi; Additional written material by: Zach Paez	September 8, 2014	206	0.87
25	5	"Soos and the Real Girl"	Matt Braly	Alex Hirsch & Mark Rizzo	September 22, 2014	205	0.84
26	6	"Little Gift Shop of Horrors"	Stephen Sandoval	Matt Chapman, Alex Hirsch & Shion Takeuchi; Additional written material by: Zach Paez	October 4, 2014 (Note: This episode premiered on Disney Channel prior to Disney XD. The episode premiered on Disney XD on October 6, 2014.)	209	2.31
27	7	"Society of the Blind Eye"	Sunil Hall	Matt Chapman & Alex Hirsch; Additional written material by: Zach Paez	October 27, 2014	207	1.07
28	8	"Blendin's Game"	Matt Braly	Alex Hirsch & Jeff Rowe	November 10, 2014	208	0.78
29	9	"The Love God"	Sunil Hall	Alex Hirsch & Josh Weinstein	November 26, 2014	210	0.82
30	10	"Northwest Mansion Mystery"	Matt Braly	Alex Hirsch, Mark Rizzo & Jeff Rowe	February 16, 2015	211	1.17
31	11	"Not What He Seems"	Stephen Sandoval	Matt Chapman, Alex Hirsch, Jeff Rowe, Shion Takeuchi & Josh Weinstein; Additional written material by: Zach Paez	March 9, 2015	212	1.58
32	12	"A Tale of Two Stans" (Note: The runtime of this episode is 29 minutes long, rather than the usual length of 22 minutes.)	Sunil Hall	Matt Chapman, Alex Hirsch & Josh Weinstein	July 13, 2015	213	1.91
33	13	"Dungeons, Dungeons & More Dungeons"	Stephen Sandoval	Matt Chapman, Alex Hirsch & Josh Weinstein; Additional written material by: Zach Paez	August 3, 2015	214	1.22
34	14	"The Stanchurian Candidate"	Matt Braly	Alex Hirsch, Jeff Rowe & Josh Weinstein; Additional written material by: Mike Rianda	August 24, 2015	213	1.16
35	15	"The Last Mabelcorn"	Matt Braly	Alex Hirsch	September 7, 2015	222	0.84
36	16	"Roadside Attraction"	Sunil Hall	Alex Hirsch, Jeff Rowe & Josh Weinstein	September 21, 2015	217	0.91
37	17	"Dipper and Mabel vs. the Future"	Stephen Sandoval	Matt Chapman, Alex Hirsch & Josh Weinstein; Outline by: Alex Hirsch & Mark Rizzo	October 12, 2015	218	0.94
38	18	"Weirdmageddon Part 1" (Note: Titled "Xpcveaoqfoxso" in subsequent airings.)	Sunil Hall	Alex Hirsch & Josh Weinstein	October 26, 2015	219	1.41
39	19	"Weirdmageddon 2: Escape from Reality"	Matt Braly	Alex Hirsch & Jeff Rowe	November 23, 2015	220	1.67
40	20	"Weirdmageddon 3: Take Back the Falls" (Note: This episode is a one-hour special. Since its original airing, this episode has sometimes been split up into two separate episodes, with the first maintaining the original title, while the second is titled "Weirdmageddon 4: Somewhere in the Woods"; the splitting is also observed on Disney+.)	Stephen Sandoval	Alex Hirsch, Shion Takeuchi, Mark Rizzo, Jeff Rowe & Josh Weinstein	February 15, 2016	221/223	2.47

== Shorts ==
The short series, Dipper's Guide to the Unexplained, Mabel's Guide to Life, Fixin' It with Soos, TV Shorts and Mabel's Scrapbook, aired between the two seasons of Gravity Falls.

=== Shorts overview ===
Series	Episodes	Originally released	
Series	Episodes	First released	Last released
Creature in the Closet	1	April 17, 2012	
Dipper's Guide to the Unexplained	6	October 14, 2013	October 18, 2013
Mabel's Guide to Life	5	February 3, 2014	February 7, 2014
Fixin' It with Soos	2	April 21, 2014	April 22, 2014
Public Access TV	2	April 23, 2014	April 24, 2014
Mabel's Scrapbook	2	June 2, 2014	
Creepy Letters from Lil' Gideon	5	November 7, 2014	December 2, 2014
Old Man McGucket's Conspiracy Corner	10	April 19, 2015	
Grunkle Stan's Lost Mystery Shack Interviews	13	June 28, 2015	July 12, 2015
'Pocalypse Preppin'	8	October 21, 2015	November 16, 2015
Mystery Shack: Shop at Home with Mr. Mystery	9	November 16, 2015	November 22, 2015
Soos' Stan Fiction	4	February 17, 2017	
Gravity Falls x Line Rider	1	September 11, 2020	
Call Me Maybe Parody	1	September 25, 2020	
How NOT to Draw	1	August 17, 2024	

=== Creature in the Closet (2012) ===
No. overall	No. in series	Title	Original release date	Prod. code
1	1	"Creature in the Closet"	April 17, 2012	TBA
Dipper and Mabel witness an unknown creature run into the closet and try to catch it on tape.

=== Dipper's Guide to the Unexplained (2013) ===
No. overall	No. in series	Title	Original release date	Prod. code
2	1	"Candy Monster"	October 14, 2013	004
Dipper and Mabel investigate Anomaly #76, a monster trying to eat their leftover Summerween candy.
3	2	"Stan's Tattoo"	October 14, 2013	001
Dipper tries to investigate Anomaly #23, the enigma that is Stan's tattoo.
4	3	"The Mailbox"	October 15, 2013	002
Dipper and Soos investigate Anomaly #54, a mailbox in the middle of the woods that can communicate and answer any question.
5	4	"Lefty"	October 16, 2013	006
Dipper and Mabel investigate Anomaly #82, a guy who only faces left.
6	5	"The Tooth"	October 17, 2013	005
Dipper, Mabel, and her bear puppet Bear-o investigate Anomaly #42, a gigantic tooth on the shores of the lake.
7	6	"The Hide-Behind"	October 18, 2013	003
Dipper investigates Anomaly #132, a lumberjack legend known as the hide-behind, a creature never seen before.

=== Mabel's Guide to Life (2014) ===
No. overall	No. in series	Title	Original release date	Prod. code
8	1	"Mabel's Guide to Dating"	February 3, 2014	008
Mabel tests her dating quiz on Grunkle Stan, Dipper, and Soos.
9	2	"Mabel's Guide to Stickers"	February 4, 2014	010
Mabel gives her perspective on the history of stickers.
10	3	"Mabel's Guide to Fashion"	February 5, 2014	009
Mabel talks about how she's great at fashion, and then shows some flash makeovers on Soos, Stan, and Old Man McGucket.
11	4	"Mabel's Guide to Color"	February 6, 2014	011
Mabel learns Grunkle Stan has never seen a rainbow and declares a color emergency.
12	5	"Mabel's Guide to Art"	February 7, 2014	007
Mabel's gift of art has driven her to create of her own art movement: the "Cat-icature" and "Humanicaticature".

=== Fixin' It with Soos (2014) ===
No. overall	No. in series	Title	Original release date	Prod. code
13	1	"Golf Cart"	April 21, 2014	015
Soos helps Wendy and Dipper fix the golf cart after they crash it during a stunt.
14	2	"Cuckoo Clock"	April 22, 2014	014
Stan gets annoyed with a cuckoo clock and breaks it, so Soos decides to fix and decorate it along with Mabel.

=== Public Access TV (2014) ===
No. overall	No. in series	Title	Original release date	Prod. code
15	1	"TV Shorts 1"	April 23, 2014	016
The episode starts with Mabel turning the TV on. Then she sees the following TV shorts: "Mystery Shack Commercial", "Soos Says Some Words" and "Li'l Gideon's Big House".
16	2	"TV Shorts 2"	April 24, 2014	017
The episode starts with Grunkle Stan turning the TV on. Then the following shorts appear: "Why You Ackin' So Cray-Cray?", "Teenz Talk" and "Duck-tective".

=== Mabel's Scrapbook (2014) ===
No. overall	No. in series	Title	Original release date	Prod. code
17	1	"Heist Movie"	June 2, 2014	013
Mabel tells the story of how she, Stan, Dipper and Soos snuck into the movie theater to see the movie Pony Heist.
18	2	"Petting Zoo"	June 2, 2014	012
Mabel tells the story of how the family visited the petting zoo where they saved a mutated cow from being potentially eaten.

=== Creepy Letters from Lil' Gideon (2014) ===
No. overall	No. in series	Title	Original release date	Prod. code
19	1	"Cease and Desist"	November 7, 2014	TBA
Lil' Gideon writes a letter to Mabel from prison.
20	2	"Dipper Tickle"	November 9, 2014	TBA
Lil' Gideon writes a letter to Dipper from prison.
21	3	"Pine-scented"	November 16, 2014	TBA
Lil' Gideon writes a letter to the Pines family from prison.
22	4	"Revenge"	November 26, 2014	TBA
Lil' Gideon writes a letter to the people of Gravity Falls from prison.
23	5	"Devoted"	December 2, 2014	TBA
Lil' Gideon writes another letter to Mabel from prison.

=== Old Man McGucket's Conspiracy Corner (2015) ===
No. overall	No. in series	Title	Original release date	Prod. code
24	1	"6-18"	April 19, 2015	TBA
Old Man McGucket discusses the conspiracy about the number 6-18.
25	2	"Cryptograms"	April 19, 2015	TBA
Old Man McGucket discusses the hidden cryptograms in Gravity Falls.
26	3	"Eyes"	April 19, 2015	TBA
Old Man McGucket discusses the conspiracy regarding why so many residents of Gravity Falls have only one eye.
27	4	"Government Agency"	April 19, 2015	TBA
Old Man McGucket discusses the conspiracy about the government agents in Gravity Falls.
28	5	"The Ice Man"	April 19, 2015	TBA
Old Man McGucket discusses the conspiracy regarding who the ice bag in the cipher wheel represents.
29	6	"Laptop Code"	April 19, 2015	TBA
Old Man McGucket discusses the conspiracy about what the code on his laptop means.
30	7	"Medalions"	April 19, 2015	TBA
Old Man McGucket discusses the conspiracy about the Gravity Falls residents who wear gold medalions.
31	8	"Relation Shipping"	April 19, 2015	TBA
Old Man McGucket discusses Gravity Falls ships.
32	9	"Stan's Brother"	April 19, 2015	TBA
Old Man McGucket discusses the conspiracy about Stan's secret brother.
33	10	"Triangles"	April 19, 2015	TBA
Old Man McGucket discusses the conspiracies regarding all the different triangles seen throughout Gravity Falls.

=== Grunkle Stan's Lost Mystery Shack Interviews (2015) ===
No. overall	No. in series	Title	Original release date	Prod. code
34	1	"Jacob Bertrand"	June 28, 2015	TBA
Grunkle Stan interviews Jacob Bertrand for a job at the Mystery Shack.
35	2	"Spencer Boldman"	July 6, 2015	TBA
Grunkle Stan interviews Spencer Boldman for a job at the Mystery Shack.
36	3	"Mekai Curtis"	July 6, 2015	TBA
Grunkle Stan interviews Mekai Curtis for a job at the Mystery Shack.
37	4	"Tyrel Jackson Williams"	July 6, 2015	TBA
Grunkle Stan interviews Tyrel Jackson Williams for a job at the Mystery Shack.
38	5	"Billy Unger"	July 6, 2015	TBA
Grunkle Stan interviews Billy Unger for a job at the Mystery Shack.
39	6	"Cade Sutton"	July 6, 2015	TBA
Grunkle Stan interviews Cade Sutton for a job at the Mystery Shack.
40	7	"Jake Short"	July 6, 2015	TBA
Grunkle Stan interviews Jake Short for a job at the Mystery Shack.
41	8	"Cameron Boyce"	July 6, 2015	TBA
Grunkle Stan interviews Cameron Boyce for a job at the Mystery Shack.
42	9	"Joey Bragg"	July 6, 2015	TBA
Grunkle Stan interviews Joey Bragg for a job at the Mystery Shack.
43	10	"Bradley Steven Perry"	July 9, 2015	TBA
Grunkle Stan interviews Bradley Steven Perry for a job at the Mystery Shack.
44	11	"Kelli Berglund"	July 9, 2015	TBA
Grunkle Stan interviews Kelli Berglund for a job at the Mystery Shack.
45	12	"Tenzing Trainor"	July 11, 2015	TBA
Grunkle Stan interviews Tenzing Trainor for a job at the Mystery Shack.
46	13	"Zendaya"	July 12, 2015	TBA
Grunkle Stan interviews Zendaya for a job at the Mystery Shack.

=== 'Pocalypse Preppin' (2015) ===
No. overall	No. in series	Title	Original release date	Prod. code
47	1	"Ready for Anything"	October 21, 2015	TBA
Old Man McGucket isn't sure what’s going on, but claims he's prepared for anything.
48	2	"Hillbilly Shelter"	October 23, 2015	TBA
Old Man McGucket locks himself in a shelter during the apocalypse.
49	3	"Hunkered Down"	October 23, 2015	TBA
Old Man McGucket describes the survival shelter he's hiding out in during the apocalypse.
50	4	"Food Stockpile"	October 24, 2015	TBA
Old Man McGucket lists off all of the food he has stored for the apocalypse.
51	5	"How'd It Happen?"	November 9, 2015	TBA
Old Man McGucket ponders how the apocalypse came to be.
52	6	"Checkmate"	November 13, 2015	TBA
Old Man McGucket plays checkers with himself to pass the time during the apocalypse.
53	7	"Governor of America"	November 16, 2015	TBA
Old Man McGucket talks about running for governor during the apocalypse.
54	8	"Remembrance"	November 16, 2015	TBA
Old Man McGucket reflects on how things were before the apocalypse.

=== Mystery Shack: Shop at Home with Mr. Mystery (2015) ===
No. overall	No. in series	Title	Original release date	Prod. code
55	1	"Jar of Eyes"	November 16, 2015	TBA
Grunkle Stan hosts a fake television advertisement for a "Jar of Mysterious Eyeballs".
56	2	"Aztec Calendar"	November 17, 2015	TBA
Grunkle Stan hosts a fake television advertisement for a "Genuine Imitation Aztec Calendar".
57	3	"Fez"	November 18, 2015	TBA
Grunkle Stan hosts a fake television advertisement for a "Replica Mr. Mystery Fez".
58	4	"Deer Teeth"	November 19, 2015	TBA
Grunkle Stan hosts a fake television advertisement for "Probably Enchanted Deer Teeth".
59	5	"Mystery Box"	November 20, 2015	TBA
Grunkle Stan hosts a fake television advertisement for a mystery box.
60	6	"UFO on a String"	November 21, 2015	TBA
Grunkle Stan hosts a fake television advertisement for a "Ultra-Realistic UFO on a String".
61	7	"Nacho Necklace"	November 22, 2015	TBA
Grunkle Stan hosts a fake television advertisement for a "Gold-Colored Nacho Necklace".
62	8	"Diving Helmet"	November 22, 2015	TBA
Grunkle Stan hosts a fake television advertisement for a "Professional-Grade Diving Helmet".
63	9	"Outtakes"	November 22, 2015	TBA
A series of fake outtakes with Grunkle Stan that parody real famous outtakes like the Winnebago Man.

=== Soos' Stan Fiction (2017) ===
No. overall	No. in series	Title	Original release date	Prod. code
64	1	"Soos' Stan Fiction #1"	February 17, 2017	TBA
Soos writes fanfiction about Stan and Ford battling a monster in Antarctica.
65	2	"Soos' Stan Fiction #2"	February 17, 2017	TBA
Soos writes fanfiction about Stan and Ford visiting a haunted train station in New York.
66	3	"Soos' Stan Fiction #3"	February 17, 2017	TBA
Soos writes fanfiction about Ford finding an axolotl in the woods.
67	4	"Soos' Fan Fiction Behind the Scenes w/ Kiel Johnson"	February 18, 2017	TBA
In a behind the scenes video uploaded to Disney XD's YouTube Channel, we get a look at the production of the segments, with a tour by cardboard artist and creator of the shorts, Kiel Johnson.

=== Gravity Falls x Line Rider (2020) ===
No. overall	No. in series	Title	Original release date	Prod. code
68	1	"Gravity Falls x Line Rider"	September 11, 2020	TBA
Dipper, Mabel, and Grunkle Stan ride on a Gravity Falls-themed Line Rider track.

=== Broken Karaoke (2020) ===
No. overall	No. in series	Title	Original release date	Prod. code
69	1	"Call Me Maybe Parody"	September 25, 2020	TBA
Mabel sings "Call Me Mabel", a parody of Carly Rae Jepsen's song "Call Me Maybe".

=== How NOT to Draw (2024) ===
No. overall	No. in series	Title	Original release date	Prod. code
70	1	"How NOT to Draw: Grunkle Stan"	August 17, 2024	TBA
During a drawing tutorial for Grunkle Stan, the animator (Alan Ruck), accidentally unleashes Bill Cipher onto his animation desk. Bill then tries to get the animator to shake his hand and set him free.

== Behind-the-scenes special ==
Title	Original air date	U.S. viewers (millions)
"Between the Pines"	February 8, 2016 (Note: A "Post-Finale Edition" of this episode aired on March 26, 2016. It featured clips from the series finale added in.)	0.77
In this special episode, hosted by Time Baby and series creator Alex Hirsch, exclusive facts, secrets and information regarding the series are revealed.

== Box set exclusives ==
These were created by Shout! Factory and released on July 24, 2018 as exclusive bonus features in the Gravity Falls: The Complete Series box set.

Title	Original air date	U.S. viewers (millions)
"One Crazy Summer: A Look Back at Gravity Falls"	July 24, 2018	N/A
This 105-minute-long documentary goes into a deeper dive into how Gravity Falls was made.
"The Hirsch Twins"	July 24, 2018	N/A
Alex & Ariel Hirsch remember their own summers growing up.
