= Dreamscaperers =

- Gravity Falls episode
- "Dreamscaperers" was the debut episode of the series' main antagonist, Bill Cipher. Alasdair Wilkins from The A.V. Club described the character as the Eye of Providence wearing a top hat, stating that he was the most memorable creation in the episode.
- Episode no.: Season 1 Episode 19
- Directed by: Joe Pitt; John Aoshima
- Written by: Tim McKeon; Matt Chapman; Alex Hirsch
- Editing by: Kevin Locarro
- Original air date: July 12, 2013
- Running time: 23 minutes

Episode chronology
← Previous "Land Before Swine"	Next → "Gideon Rises"
- Gravity Falls season 1

"Dreamscaperers" is the nineteenth and penultimate episode of the first season of the American animated series Gravity Falls. The episode is the first of the two-part season finale of the season (the second being "Gideon Rises"). It originally aired on the Disney Channel on July 12, 2013, and was written by series creator Alex Hirsch, alongside Tim McKeon and Matt Chapman, and directed by Joe Pitt and John Aoshima. The episode marks the first appearance of Bill Cipher, the series' main antagonist.

The series follows twins Dipper and Mabel, who live with their grand uncle, Grunkle Stan in a tourist trap called the Mystery Shack in the fictional town of Gravity Falls, Oregon. In this episode, Stan's nemesis Gideon (Thurop Van Orman) tries to steal the deed to the Mystery Shack from Stan's safe. When thrown out again, Gideon summons a demon called Bill Cipher (Hirsch) and asks him to invade Stan's mind and steal the combination to the safe. Dipper (Jason Ritter) along with Mabel (Kristen Schaal) and their friend Soos also venture into Stan's mind to prevent Bill from finding the combination.

The episode was watched by 2.7 million viewers in its original American broadcast on the Disney Channel, and received positive reviews from television critics.

== Plot ==
External videos
- Gravity Falls Full Episode S1 E19 Dreamscaperers @disneyxd — Official upload of the episode onto YouTube

Grunkle Stan foils another attempt by Lil’ Gideon Gleeful to steal the deed to the Mystery Shack from his safe. Later while playing in the forest, Mabel and Soos overhear Gideon performing a ritual to summon an entity named Bill Cipher. Gideon forges a deal with Bill and tasks him with extracting Stan’s memory of the safe code. With help from Dipper’s journal, the twins and Soos follow Bill into Stan’s mind in order to find the code before Bill does.

Within Stan’s mindscape is a surreal version of the Mystery Shack where memories are accessed through hallways filled with doors. The trio meets Bill who warns and taunts them of their endeavor before quickly entering the Shack. Mabel and Soos follow after him while Dipper stumbles upon a memory where Stan supposedly describes him as weak and unbecoming. Dipper is upset and abandons the search. Upon closer listen, however, he realizes that Stan was describing his own rough childhood and that he intends on teaching Dipper to fight for himself. Dipper then accidentally meets the imaginary Stan who reminds him that anything is possible in the mind. Meanwhile, Mabel locates the safe code first and asks Soos to destroy it, only for him to actually be Bill in disguise who runs off with the memory.

After escaping the two, Bill is contacted by Gideon to give him the safe code but Mabel knocks it out of Bill’s hand and into a memory of the Bottomless Pit. Gideon calls off the deal and an angered Bill retaliates by realizing Mabel’s and Soos’s worst nightmares. Dipper rescues his friends and tells them imaginary Stan’s advice. Together, the trio fight back and attempt to eject Bill out of Stan’s mind. Bill immediately stops the fight and accepts defeat; before leaving, he foretells of a “dark day” in the near future and that he will keep watch until that day arrives. Dipper, Mabel and Soos awaken to Stan who is unaware of their recent adventure. Seconds later, Gideon manages to steal the deed using dynamite to blow open the safe. The episode ends on a cliffhanger where Gideon's demolition crew drives out the Pines family and Soos from the Mystery Shack.

== Production ==
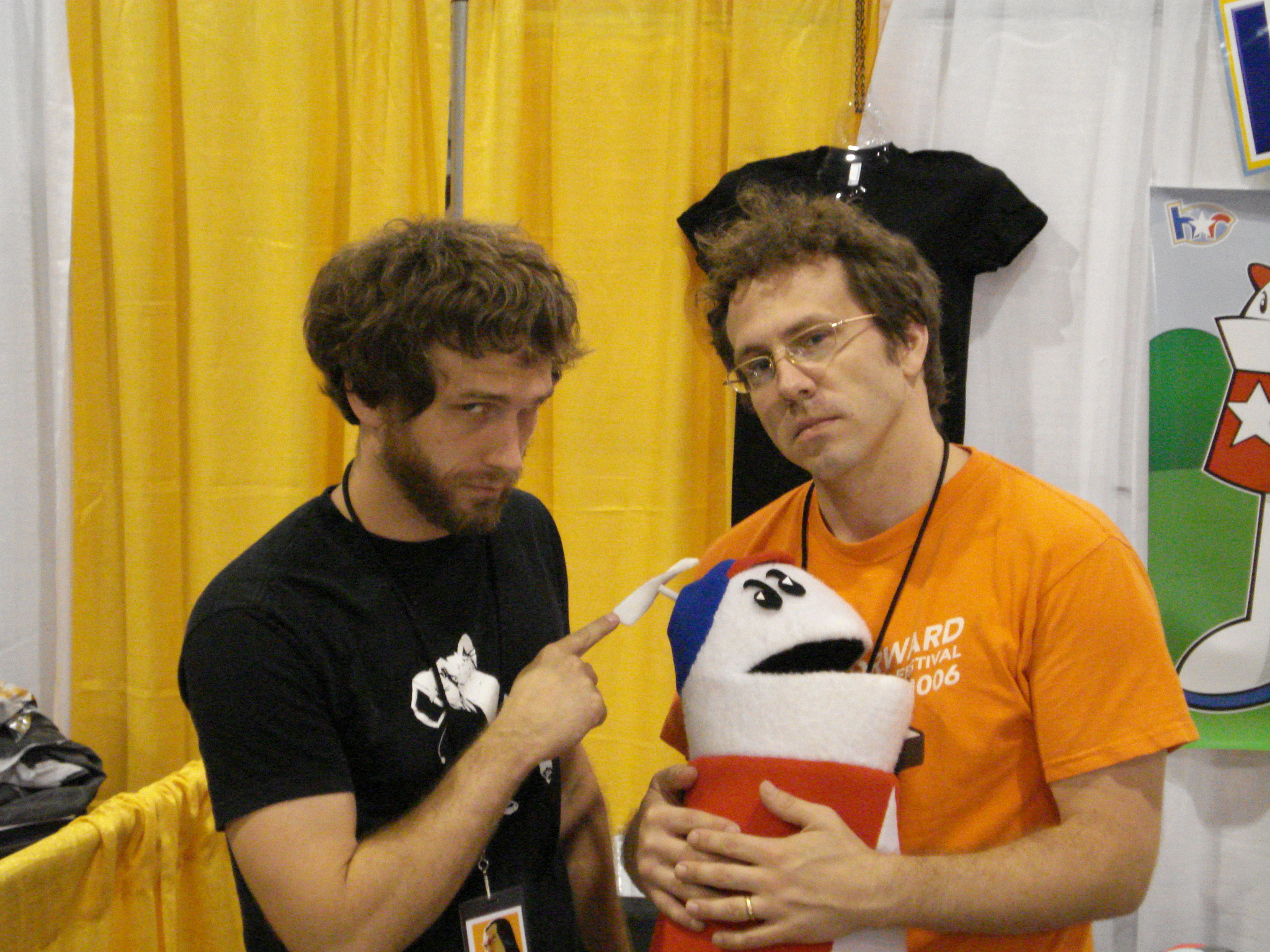
Matt Chapman (left) from The Brothers Chaps and co-creator of Homestar Runner worked on writing the episode.

The episode "Dreamscaperers" was written by Timothy "Tim" McKeon and Matthew "Matt" Chapman under the story of series creator Alexander "Alex" Hirsch. Series developers Joe Pitt and John Aoshima directed the episode. John Aoshima and Matt Braly have worked with Hirsch on the show ever since the making of the unaired, unnamed pilot that was used to pitch the show.

In "Dreamscaperers" there was the first appearance of the series antagonist Bill Cipher, however images of him are shown throughout the season. During the scene where Bill is summoned he strikes out a number of images on his body, like John F. Kennedy, UFOs, the Aztec calendar stone, the Apollo Moon landing, Stonehenge, Giza pyramids, crop circles, etc. continuing the show's scoffing of conspiracy theories. The characters Xyler and Craz from the fictional movie "Dream Boys High" are based on 1980s cartoons and teen films produced in the United States.

The cast of the episode consisted of the standards Jason Ritter as Dipper Pines, Kristen Schaal as Mabel Pines, Alex Hirsch as Stan Pines, Soos, and the new character Bill Cipher, and Thurop Van Orman as Lil' Gideon. Additional voices include Linda Cardellini as Wendy, Greg Cipes as Craz, John Roberts as Xyler, Jennifer Coolidge as Lazy Susan, Grey DeLisle as Carla McCorkle, Kevin Michael Richardson as Sheriff Blubs, and Stephen Root as Bud Gleeful.

== Broadcast and reception ==
"Dreamscaperers" premiered on the Disney Channel on July 12, 2013, and it gained 2.700 million viewers in its original American broadcast, ranking it in second place in the United States for the day of airing. It received a 0.5 rating from 18 to 49 demographic audience.

Alasdair Wilkins from The A.V. Club, giving it a grade of A-, described the episode as "a joyous celebration of all that Gravity Falls has accomplished over these first 19 episodes". In the episode review Wilkins stated "the show has become sophisticated enough in its storytelling and its character work that it can more easily spotlight a character so delightfully silly". He states that Bill Cipher is the most memorable creation in the episode describing him as "the Eye of Providence wearing a top hat", also stating that "the writing and Alex Hirsch's voicework hit a fascinating balance with the character; Bill is capable of genuine rage when his plans don't work out, yet there's always the sense that he's just toying with the kids, allowing them to temporarily beat him because it amuses him". However, Wilkins criticized the episode for using "under-motivated stories", also for the efforts by the writing staff to give Mabel and Dipper an equal status in the show.

The episode won art director Ian Worrel an Outstanding Individual Achievement in Animation award at the 2014 Primetime Creative Arts Emmy Awards.

== International airdates ==
- October 2, 2013: Switzerland
- November 25, 2013: Germany
- March 14, 2014: Austria
