= Bottomless Pit! =

- Gravity Falls episode
- Episode no.: Season 1 Episode 14
- Directed by: Joe Pitt; Aaron Springer
- Written by: Alex Hirsch; Mike Rianda
- Production code: 618G-113
- Original air date: March 1, 2013
- Running time: 22 minutes

Episode chronology
← Previous "Boss Mabel"	Next → "The Deep End"
- Gravity Falls season 1

"Bottomless Pit!" is the 14th episode of the first season of the American animated television series Gravity Falls, which was created by Alex Hirsch. It was written by Alex Hirsch and Mike Rianda, and directed by Joe Pitt and Aaron Springer. The episode features Soos, Grunkle Stan, Dipper Pines, and Mabel Pines falling down a bottomless pit and telling stories to pass the time.

"Bottomless Pit!" premiered on Disney Channel in the United States on March 1, 2013, and garnered 3.45 million viewers and a 0.5 rating in the 18-49 demographic on its premiere night.

== Plot ==
External videos
- Gravity Falls Full Episode S1 E14 Bottomless Pit! @disneyxd Official upload of the episode onto YouTube

Mabel, Grunkle Stan and Soos dump their trash into a bottomless pit located outside the Mystery Shack as an exhibit. When Dipper doubts the possibility of such a pit, strong winds push everyone into the hole where they seem to fall indefinitely. In order to pass the time, each person volunteers to tell a story.

Dipper volunteers first with a story about his insecurity with his cracking voice (“Voice Over”). Old Man McGucket gives him a serum to deepen his voice. Although Dipper is initially satisfied by the results, his new voice draws the fear and ire of the townspeople. He finally embraces his real voice and asks Old Man McGucket to restore it to normal.

The next story is told by Soos about his playing an old pinball machine found in the Shack (“Soos’ Really Great Pinball Story”). In an attempt to achieve the high score, Dipper and Mabel help Soos cheat by tilting the machine. The machine punishes the trio by sucking them into the game in its most challenging mode. While the twins distract the pinball machine, Soos reluctantly shuts down the game which deletes his high score but also frees him and the twins. Stan is dissatisfied by their stories so far and spins a tale where he wins a football game (“Grunkle Stan Wins the Football Bowl”) but his narration is cut short by the others' negative response.

The last story is told by Mabel about her taking issue with Stan’s habitual lying (“Trooth Ache”) which has led him to evade the law on several occasions. To stop his dishonesty, Mabel uses Dipper’s journal to find a pair of golden dentures that prevent the wearer from lying. Mabel secretly puts the dentures on Stan and while she is relieved at first, the plan backfires when Stan nearly surrenders himself to law enforcement. As a final resort, Mabel herself lies to the sheriffs and saves Stan from getting arrested. She later throws the golden teeth into the bottomless pit, bringing the events back to the present.

A white light appears below the group until they emerge back at the top of the pit; no time had passed while they fell inside. Everyone agrees to keep the incident to themselves before Stan falls back into the pit again by himself.

== Production ==
The episode was written by show creator Alex Hirsch and creative director Mike Rianda.

== Reception ==
Alasdair Wilkins of The A.V. Club awarded the episode an "A−", praising the episode's trilogy format. Wilkins also praised the relative insanity of the stories. In 2024, an edited clip of this episode where Grunkle Stan narrates his outlandish football story went viral as a meme on TikTok and X (formerly Twitter). "Grunkle Stunkle wins the Funkle Bunkle" originated from a YouTube Poop made in 2017 by user Crash Matilda. The account was later set to private with reuploads of its content appearing around 2020. On August 30, 2024, the clip was posted on TikTok where it garnered 250,000 plays within a month. An X page began posting daily uploads of the meme and its variants around the same time. Gravity Falls creator Alex Hirsch responded to the meme on his X account in September 2024.
