= Gravity Falls: Journal 3 =

2016 book by Alex Hirsch and Rob Renzetti

- The book's front dustjacket
- Series: Gravity Falls
- Page count: 288 pages
- Publisher: Disney Press

Creative team
- Artists: Andy Gonsalves; Stephanie Ramirez
- Creator: Alex Hirsch; Rob Renzetti

Original publication
- Dates of publication: July 26, 2016; June 13, 2017 (Special Edition)
- Language: English
- ISBN: 9781484746691; 9781368002509 (Special Edition)

Chronology
- Preceded by: Gravity Falls Cinestory Comic Vol. 1 (December 8, 2015)
- Followed by: Gravity Falls: Dipper and Mabel and the Curse of the Time Pirates' Treasure!: A "Select Your Own Choose-Venture!" (July 26, 2016)

Gravity Falls: Journal 3 is a book published by Disney Publishing Worldwide, based on the animated television series Gravity Falls. Written by series creator Alex Hirsch and supervising producer Rob Renzetti, the book is a real-life adaptation of Journal 3, canonically written by Stanford Pines.

First announced in October 2015 at New York Comic Con 2015, the book was released on July 26, 2016. The book became a New York Times Bestseller in 2016.

== Publication history ==
Gravity Falls is an animated television series created by Alex Hirsch. In the show exists a collection of journals written by a once-unknown author, Dipper and Mabel's great uncle Stanford "Ford" Pines. Dipper Pines, finds the third book while hanging signs at the forest hidden by his great uncle Stanford in the first episode. Season 1 antagonist Gideon Gleeful held the second book, and protagonists' great uncle and the author's twin brother Stanley Pines held the first book since the beginning. The journals include entries from the author's documentation of Gravity Falls. In the series, Dipper uses the third journal as his own as he documents his summer in the town.

The book was announced at New York Comic Con 2015, referred to as "Dipper's Journal". The book was released months after the series finale on July 26, 2016. A promotional informercial for the book, with Kristen Schaal, Jason Ritter. and Alex Hirsch reprising their roles from the series, was released by Oh My Disney on March 28, 2017.

The book became a New York Times Bestseller in August 2016, remaining on the bestseller list for in excess of 47 weeks.

=== Special edition ===
A higher-priced limited "blacklight edition" of the book was announced at New York Comic Con 2016 as a more canonical version of the book featuring invisible ink, real parchment paper, a magnifying glass, and physical Polaroids, similar to the show. The book is also packaged in paper unlike the book's dustjacket. The book was initially announced to have a release on February 14, 2017 but was postponed to June 13, 2017 after overwhelming pre-order demands, with only 10,000 copies being made available.

== Foreign releases ==
Cover for the special "blacklight" edition of the book.

Language	Title	Publisher	Date published	ISBN	Binding	Translators
Russian	Гравити Фолз Дневник 3	Эксмо	June 6, 2017	ISBN 978-5699906567	Hardcover	Осьмачко Є.О.
Spanish	Gravity Falls: Diario 3	Planeta México	June 15, 2017	ISBN 978-6070741050	Paperback	—
Spanish	Gravity Falls: Diario 3	Libros Disney	March 5, 2019	ISBN 978-8417529468	Hardcover	—
Portuguese	O Diário Perdido de Gravity Falls	Dom Quixote	July 1, 2018	ISBN 978-9722064873	Hardcover	Raquel Nakasone; Aline Uchida
Hebrew	גרוויטי פולס : יומן 3 חלק א'	Yedioth Books	April 2018	—	Hardcover	—
French	GRAVITY FALLS - le journal	Hachette Romans	March 21, 2018	ISBN 978-2016269480	Paperback	Valérie Drouet

=== Differences in foreign releases ===
- Due to anti-LGBTQIA+ laws in Russia, the book removed a drawing depicting Dipper Pines kissing "Mermando the Merman".
- Spanish had a paperback and a hardcover release. Both books are smaller in comparison to the original. Only the paperback version had a dustjacket.
  - The hardcover version's lack of a dustjacket meant the branding and logos were placed on the book cover. The portal blueprints contained at the back of the dustjacket were made into a page at the end of the book.
- French's paperback release is similar to the Spanish hardcover version with its lack of a dustjacket.
- Spanish and Portuguese releases had to be republished due to outrage from media outlets. The outrage came from a note from Bill Cipher possessing Dipper Pines, it reads how he plans to throw his body to act like a suicide and suggests his sister Mabel to "join him".
- Hebrew releases were split into 2 separate books. The first book ends right after Stanford "Ford" Pines' disappearance.
