= Inauguration of Franklin D. Roosevelt =

Inauguration of Franklin D. Roosevelt may refer to:

- First inauguration of Franklin D. Roosevelt, 1933
- Second inauguration of Franklin D. Roosevelt, 1937
- Third inauguration of Franklin D. Roosevelt, 1941
- Fourth inauguration of Franklin D. Roosevelt, 1945

== See also ==
- The full text of Franklin Roosevelt's First Inaugural Address at Wikisource
- The full text of Franklin Roosevelt's Second Inaugural Address at Wikisource
- The full text of Franklin Roosevelt's Third Inaugural Address at Wikisource
- The full text of Franklin Roosevelt's Fourth Inaugural Address at Wikisource
