= Grunkle Stan =

Fictional character from Gravity Falls

- Gravity Falls character
- First appearance: "Tourist Trapped"; Gravity Falls; June 15, 2012
- Last appearance: The Book of Bill (2024)
- Created by: Alex Hirsch
- Voiced by: Alex Hirsch; Declan J. Krogman (young)

In-universe information
- Full name: Stanley Pines
- Aliases: Stanford Pines; Steve Pinington; Stetson Pinefield; Andrew "8-Ball" Alcatraz; Hal Forrester
- Nicknames: Grunkle Stan; Mr. Mystery; Mr. Pines
- Gender: Male
- Occupation: Owner of the Mystery Shack
- Family: Stanford Pines (older twin brother); Sherman Pines (brother); Filbrick Pines (father); Caryn Pines (mother); Dipper Pines (great-nephew); Mabel Pines (great-niece); Mr. Pines (nephew); Mrs. Pines (niece-in-law)
- Spouse: Marilyn Rosenstein (ex-wife)
- Origin: Glass Shard Beach, New Jersey
- Home: 618 Gopher Road, Gravity Falls, Oregon
- Nationality: American

Stanley "Stan" Pines, also known as Grunkle Stan and the assumed identity Stanford Pines, is a main character in the 2012 Disney Channel/Disney XD animated series Gravity Falls, created and voiced by the series creator Alex Hirsch. Stan is the great-uncle ("Grunkle") of the show's protagonists, twins Dipper and Mabel Pines, who are sent to live with Stan for the summer at the Mystery Shack, his house and tourist trap which presents rogue taxidermies and objects of supposedly supernatural origins. As the proprietor of the Mystery Shack, he wears a black suit, red string bow tie and fez, occasionally an eyepatch (worn over his glasses on an inconsistent side), and carries a cane topped by a billiard 8-ball. When not working, he is usually seen wearing slippers, blue and white-striped boxer shorts, a white tank top, and a gold necklace.

At the beginning of the show, Stan, known as Grunkle Stan and Stanford Pines, is portrayed as a relatively simple character, with his shady past being used primarily as a joke until later in the series. In the episode "A Tale of Two Stans", his real name is revealed as Stanley Pines, who spent 30 years covertly working to bring his own twin brother, the real Stanford Pines, back to their reality after being sucked through an interdimensional portal.

== Role in Gravity Falls ==
Stanley "Stan" Pines, who is referred to as "Grunkle Stan" or "Stanford Pines" until the return of the actual Stanford Pines, is predominantly portrayed as a scheming and frugal individual. His primary source of income is the Mystery Shack, a tourist attraction he manages, often employing humorous and cunning tactics to boost its profitability. Although Stan exhibits avaricious tendencies, he displays a sincere protective instinct towards his great nephew Dipper and great niece Mabel, whom he supervises over the summer at their parents' request. Stan feigns ignorance regarding the paranormal occurrences in Gravity Falls and often clashes with Gideon Gleeful, a malevolent child entrepreneur who runs the "Tent of Telepathy" and aspires to take over the Mystery Shack.

Stan secretly possesses the first of three mysterious journals written by Ford, his estranged twin brother. By the end of the first season, Stan acquires all three journals, the second and third previously held by Gideon and Dipper respectively. He successfully activates an interdimensional portal whose design illustrated across the journals, facilitating Ford's return from another dimension in the episode "Not What He Seems". The Pines brothers then share their backstory with Dipper and Mabel: the sons of Filbrick and Caryn Pines, the brothers grew up in Glass Shard Beach, New Jersey. Their relationship became strained when Stan inadvertently ruined Ford's chances of being accepted into a prestigious university. After their parents disowned Stan and expelled him from the house, he took up a transient career in sales and various illegal endeavors.

Later on, he accepted Ford's invitation to come to Gravity Falls, Oregon, where Ford had taken up residence to study cryptozoology and supernatural phenomena. Outraged that Ford did not invite him to reconcile, but to flee with and hide one of the journals due to the world-threatening nature of the portal's designs, Stan fought Ford until they accidentally activated the portal and Ford fell in. After this, Stan assumed Ford's identity, faked his own death in a car crash, and for the next 30 years operated the Mystery Shack out of Ford's cabin, using it as a front for his efforts to restore the portal and bring Ford home. While watching over Dipper and Mabel for the summer, he succeeds in returning his brother. The brothers face challenges in reconciling their relationship while preparing for the impending "Weirdmageddon," an apocalyptic event foretold to be instigated by Bill Cipher, an extradimensional demon and the series' primary antagonist.

During the apocalypse, Stan and an army of the series' characters rescue Ford, but Bill captures both brothers during an argument. To erase Bill from existence and stop the apocalypse, Stan agrees to change clothes with Ford so they can trick Bill—who is after a secret equation only Ford knows—into entering Stan's mind instead. As Ford begins erasing Stan's memory, Stan defeats Bill and finds that his purpose in life was to protect his family. After Gravity Falls returns to normal, Stan awakens without any memories, but his family and friends help revive them. On the last day of summer, Stan and Ford agree to live out their dream of sailing around the world to research more anomalies. Stan, now respected as a local hero, promotes his handyman Soos Ramirez to the manager of the Mystery Shack, and he is last seen fighting an anomaly at sea with Ford aboard a ship dubbed the "Stan-O-War II", in reference to a marooned ship they claimed for themselves as children.

== Character and concept ==
As Dipper and Mabel Pines are based on series creator Alex Hirsch and his twin sister Ariel, respectively, Stan is based on their grandfather, also named Stan. Both share the characteristics of being big, barrel-chested men whose clothes have popped-undone buttons; both also wear a gold chain and gold rings. His title of "grunkle" (a contraction of "great uncle") was based on how the Hirsch twins would refer to their great aunt, "Graunty" Lois.

== In other media ==
Stan has appeared in Gravity Falls–related media outside of the television series, including the 2016 novel Gravity Falls: Journal 3, the 2018 graphic novel Gravity Falls: Lost Legends, and the 2024 novel The Book of Bill.

An alternate version of the character, an anthropomorphic frog named Mr. Ponds, appears in the episode "Wax Museum" of the animated series Amphibia, with Alex Hirsch reprising his role. This character is the curator of a "Curiosity Hut" with a noted wax museum.
