= Tourist Trapped =

- Gravity Falls episode
- Episode no.: Season 1 Episode 1
- Directed by: John Aoshima
- Written by: Alex Hirsch
- Production code: 618G-107
- Original air date: June 15, 2012

Episode chronology
← Previous "Pilot"	Next → "The Legend of the Gobblewonker"
- Gravity Falls season 1

"Tourist Trapped" is the series premiere and the first episode of the first season of the American television series Gravity Falls. The episode was directed by John Aoshima and written by series creator Alex Hirsch, and premiered on Disney Channel on June 15, 2012, airing immediately after the premiere of the Disney Channel Original Movie Let It Shine.

In "Tourist Trapped", young twins Dipper (voiced by Jason Ritter) and Mabel Pines (Kristen Schaal), have recently arrived in Gravity Falls, Oregon, to stay at their great uncle Stan (Hirsch)'s tourist trap, the Mystery Shack. Mabel soon starts dating a boy named Norman (also Hirsch), but when Dipper discovers a hidden journal documenting the paranormal side of the town, he begins to believe that his sister might be dating a zombie.

== Plot ==
External videos
- Gravity Falls First Episode! Tourist Trapped S1 E1 Full Episode @disneyxd — Official upload of the episode onto YouTube

Twins “Dipper” and Mabel Pines are sent off by their parents to spend the summer in the fictional town of Gravity Falls, Oregon. They stay at the Mystery Shack, a cryptid-themed tourist trap run by their great-uncle (or "Grunkle") Stan Pines. Mabel makes the most of their vacation although Dipper is unimpressed by Stan’s poorly crafted exhibits. While hanging signs outside the Shack one day, Dipper discovers a journal with the number 3 inscribed on the cover. The journal's anonymous author claims that the mysteries of Gravity Falls are all real. Meanwhile, Mabel has begun dating a tall man named “Norman” whom Dipper suspects is a zombie according to the journal.

Norman later reveals to Mabel that he is a group of gnomes stacked on top of each other. Their leader, Jeff, orders Mabel’s abduction to force her into marrying all the gnomes. Dipper rescues Mabel on a golf cart and the gnomes give chase by stacking themselves into one giant gnome. The twins arrive at the Mystery Shack but are cornered; Mabel feigns interest in marrying Jeff to lower his guard before driving off the gnomes with a leaf blower. Later that night, Dipper writes an entry into the journal about his first experiences in Gravity Falls. The episode ends with Stan entering a hidden door behind the vending machine in the gift shop.

== Voice cast ==
- Jason Ritter as Dipper
- Kristen Schaal as Mabel
- Alex Hirsch as Grunkle Stan, Soos, Jeff and Gnomes, The employee that works at Mattress Prince's mattress store
- Linda Cardellini as Wendy
- Fred Tatasciore as Hank
- Kimberly Mooney as Hank's Wife
- Keith Ferguson as Unnamed hillbilly

== Production and broadcasting ==
"Tourist Trapped" was written by series creator Alex Hirsch and was directed by John Aoshima. The episode premiered on Disney Channel in the United States on June 15, 2012, serving as a special preview of the series. Its premiere immediately followed the premiere of the Disney Channel Original Movie Let It Shine. The episode's premiere was seen by close to 3.4 million viewers. It got 267,000 viewers when it premiered in the UK and Ireland on July 20, 2012.

== Reception ==
Alasdair Wilkins of The A.V. Club gave "Tourist Trapped" a B+ rating, praising its "mature" feel in comparison to other animated series for children (bringing inspiration from The Simpsons, The X-Files, and Twin Peaks), the show's art style, along with the use of its paranormal themes for comedy: specifically citing a scene where Mabel is seen hoping that her "zombie" boyfriend Norman was a vampire (playing off the popularity of the Twilight series), followed by the "wonderfully absurd" reveal that Norman was actually a group of gnomes. However, the remainder of the episode was criticised for being too reliant on "random" humour. Wilkins also praised Kristen Schaal for her performance as Mabel; stating that the character had "the same gleeful lack of restraint and propensity for violence (at least when it comes to punching gnomes) that Schaal brings to Louise Belcher, with the crucial difference being that she’s not a complete sociopath." Wilkins felt that Mabel was "a goofy, happy-go-lucky preteen" with a level of enthusiasm that helped support many of the gags surrounding her in the episode and that she acted within the mindset of an actual 12-year-old in her dialogue as well. Jason Ritter's performance as Dipper was also praised for giving the character a panicked and suspicious view on the world around him, but it was noted that his voice sounded too old to be a 12-year-old.

"Tourist Trapped" received two nominations for the 40th Annie Awards, including Ian Worrel for Best Production Design in a Television/Broadcast Production, and Kristen Schaal for Best Voice Acting in an Animated Television/Broadcast Production which she won.

== International airdates ==
- September 5, 2012: Switzerland
- January 7, 2013: Germany
- February 24, 2014: Austria, Schleswig-Holstein
