= Mabel Pines =

Fictional character and protagonist of Gravity Falls

- Gravity Falls character
- Mabel Pines, as depicted in Gravity Falls.
- First appearance: "Tourist Trapped" (2012)
- Last appearance: The Book of Bill (2024)
- Created by: Alex Hirsch
- Based on: Ariel Hirsch
- Voiced by: Kristen Schaal

In-universe information
- Gender: Female
- Family: Dipper Pines (younger twin brother); Mr. Pines (father); Mrs. Pines (mother)
- Relatives: Stanley Pines (grand-uncle); Stanford Pines (grand-uncle); Sherman Pines (paternal grandfather); Filbrick Pines (great-grandfather); Caryn Pines (great-grandmother)
- Nationality: American

Mabel Pines is a fictional character and one of the two protagonists of the Disney Channel/Disney XD animated series Gravity Falls. The character is voiced by Kristen Schaal, and designed by the series creator, Alex Hirsch. She is inspired by Hirsch's own twin sister, Ariel Hirsch. Mabel first appeared on the unreleased pilot created by Hirsch, which he used to pitch the show; she then appeared on the first episode "Tourist Trapped". Mabel, alongside her brother Dipper Pines, stars in every episode of the series. Mabel also has two series of shorts dedicated to her: "Mabel's Guide to Life" and "Mabel's Scrapbook". She also appears in two additional short series, "Dipper's Guide to the Unexplained" and "Fixin' it with Soos", and in the music video "Call Me Mabel", a parody of Carly Rae Jepsen's song "Call Me Maybe".

== Background ==
Mabel is an energetic 12-year-old girl (she and her brother turn 13 at the end of the series finale) who is sent alongside her brother to spend her summer vacation at her great-uncle's tourist trap called the "Mystery Shack," which is located in the fictional town of Gravity Falls, Oregon. She helps Dipper as he searches to uncover the secrets of Gravity Falls and to find an explanation for the strange situations they experience. They are aided by Soos, the Shack's handyman; Wendy, Dipper's crush and the twins' co-worker; and other characters throughout the series. The situations that they encounter include dealing with various supernatural or legendary creatures, like gnomes, cryptids, demons, aliens, minotaurs and the nefarious Bill Cipher.

Mabel is fun, brave, and determined in whatever she sets out to do. Like her brother, she struggles with growing up and wants to be seen as more than she is. She is more intelligent than she is often portrayed and will always look out for her brother.

The adventures of Mabel and her brother are inspired by the childhood of series creator Alex Hirsch and his own twin sister, Ariel. As a character, Mabel has been critically well received. She appears in various Gravity Falls merchandise, such as on clothing, in video games, and in music videos.

== Role in Gravity Falls ==
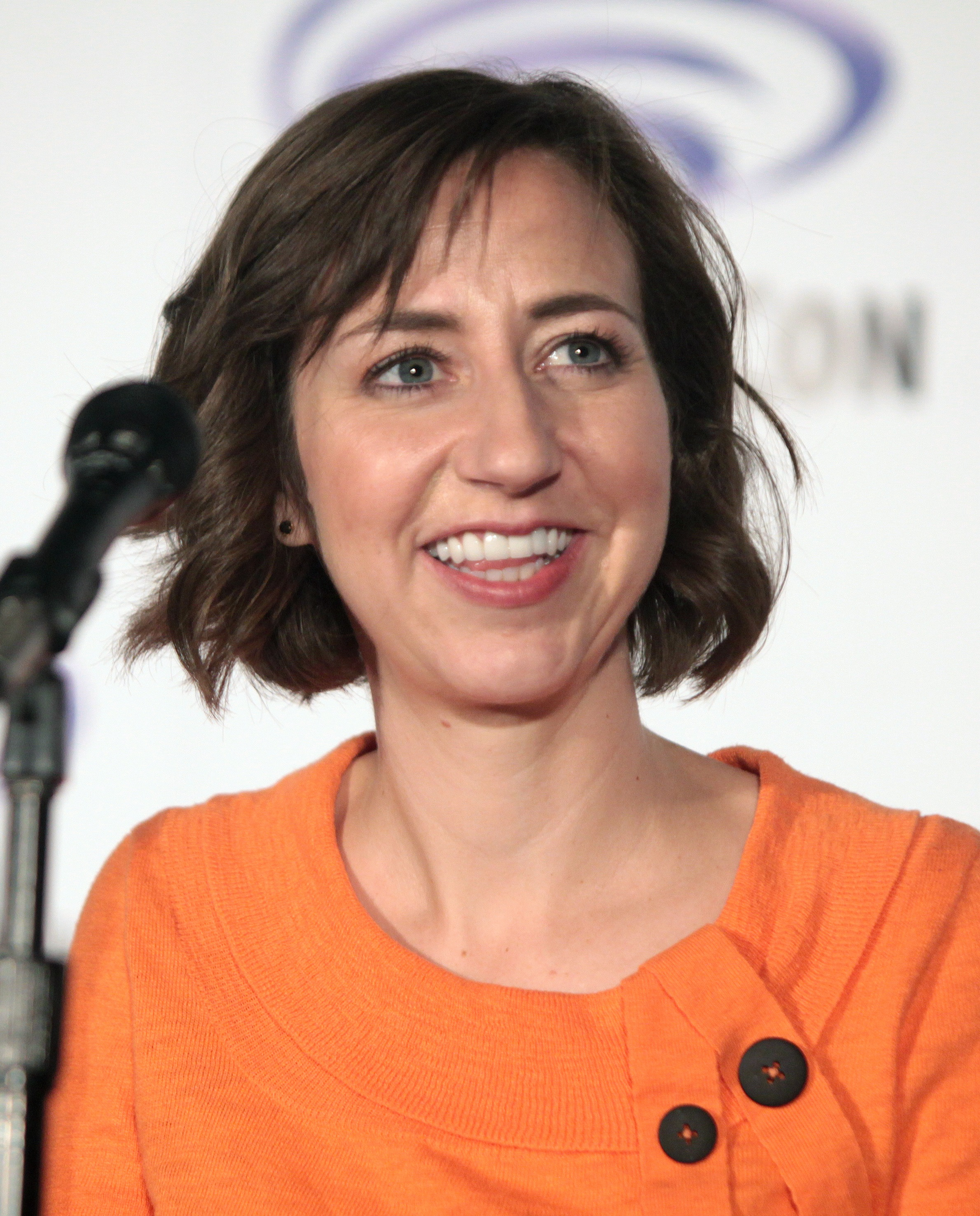
Kristen Schaal voiced Mabel in the series.

Mabel Pines is an energetic and optimistic girl from Piedmont, California, forced to spend her summer together with her Grunkle Stan in the fictional town of Gravity Falls, Oregon. She is accompanied by her twin brother Dipper Pines.

Mabel wears a variety of colorful sweaters and skirts. She is a self-proclaimed arts and crafts master, going so far as to make a wax figure of her uncle Stan with the leftover wax of a melted figure during the episode "Headhunters". She grew to like Grunkle Stan and he likes her, too, and is often protective of her and Dipper.

Mabel is boy-crazy and dislikes anyone who opposes her brother. She has a pet pig named Waddles who she won in the episode "The Time Traveler's Pig". Despite seeming as just being there for comic relief, Mabel is frequently instrumental in helping her brother solve the mysteries of Gravity Falls and played a pivotal role in all three of the fights that the twins have had against the main antagonist, Bill Cipher, to the point that Dipper says that he has no chance of defeating Bill without Mabel's help.

Show and character creator Alex Hirsch has stated on occasions that Mabel is much smarter than she seems, saying in a 2013 Reddit AMA that:

"Mabel's not stupid. She's a ham! There's a big difference. Mabel's love of goofing off is a natural force of her personality, but she can still understand when people she cares about need help or are in danger. Don't just make her a catchphrase machine. She really cares about the people around her. (Secret: Mabel's secretly jealous that her brother's better academically than she is)."

== Behind the scenes ==
Mabel is based on series creator Alex Hirsch's twin sister, Ariel Hirsch. Growing up, she had a personality that was close to that of Mabel's, similarly to Alex having one that was like Dipper's. Mabel was voiced by actress Kristen Schaal. Alex has stated in the past that Kristen was always his first choice as the voice of Mabel. She first appeared in the unreleased pilot made for Gravity Falls in 2010 by House of Cool Studios, which Alex Hirsch used to pitch the series to Disney Channel.
