= Dipper Pines =

Fictional character and protagonist in Gravity Falls

- Gravity Falls character
- Dipper Pines, as depicted in Gravity Falls.
- First appearance: "Tourist Trapped" (2012)
- Created by: Alex Hirsch
- Based on: Alex Hirsch
- Voiced by: Jason Ritter

In-universe information
- Full name: Mason Pines
- Nickname: Dipper
- Gender: Male
- Family: Mabel Pines (older twin sister); Mr. Pines (father); Mrs. Pines (mother)
- Relatives: Stanley Pines (grand-uncle); Stanford Pines (grand-uncle); Sherman Pines (paternal grandfather); Filbrick Pines (great-grandfather); Caryn Pines (great-grandmother)
- Nationality: American

Mason "Dipper" Pines is a fictional character and one of the two protagonists of the Disney Channel/Disney XD animated series Gravity Falls. The character is voiced by Jason Ritter, and is loosely based on the childhood of series creator Alex Hirsch. Beside his presence in the main series, he appears in the Gravity Falls mini-series "Dipper's Guide to the Unexplained", "Fixin' it with Soos", and "Mabel's Guide to Life", as well as the books Gravity Falls: Lost Legends, Gravity Falls: Journal 3, and The Book of Bill.

== Background ==
The characters of Dipper and his sister Mabel are inspired by the childhood of series creator Alex Hirsch and his own twin sister, Ariel Hirsch. As a character, Dipper has been critically well received. He appears in various Gravity Falls merchandise, such as on clothing and in video games.

The show's creator Alex Hirsch has stated that while Dipper is smart, he is still a kid. In a 2013 Reddit AMA, Hirsch stated that:

"Dipper's smart, but he's not a 'walking calculator'. There's a lot of kid shows featuring a character who is 'the brains.' Dipper is better academically & mathematically than Mabel, but he's also able to laugh at himself. He's a real kid. He has insecurities. He has things that he loves. I try not to pigeonhole these characters into 'ONE TYPE'. They lose their humanity if you do that. (Secret: Dipper's secretly jealous that Mabel's better socially than he is)."

== Role in Gravity Falls ==
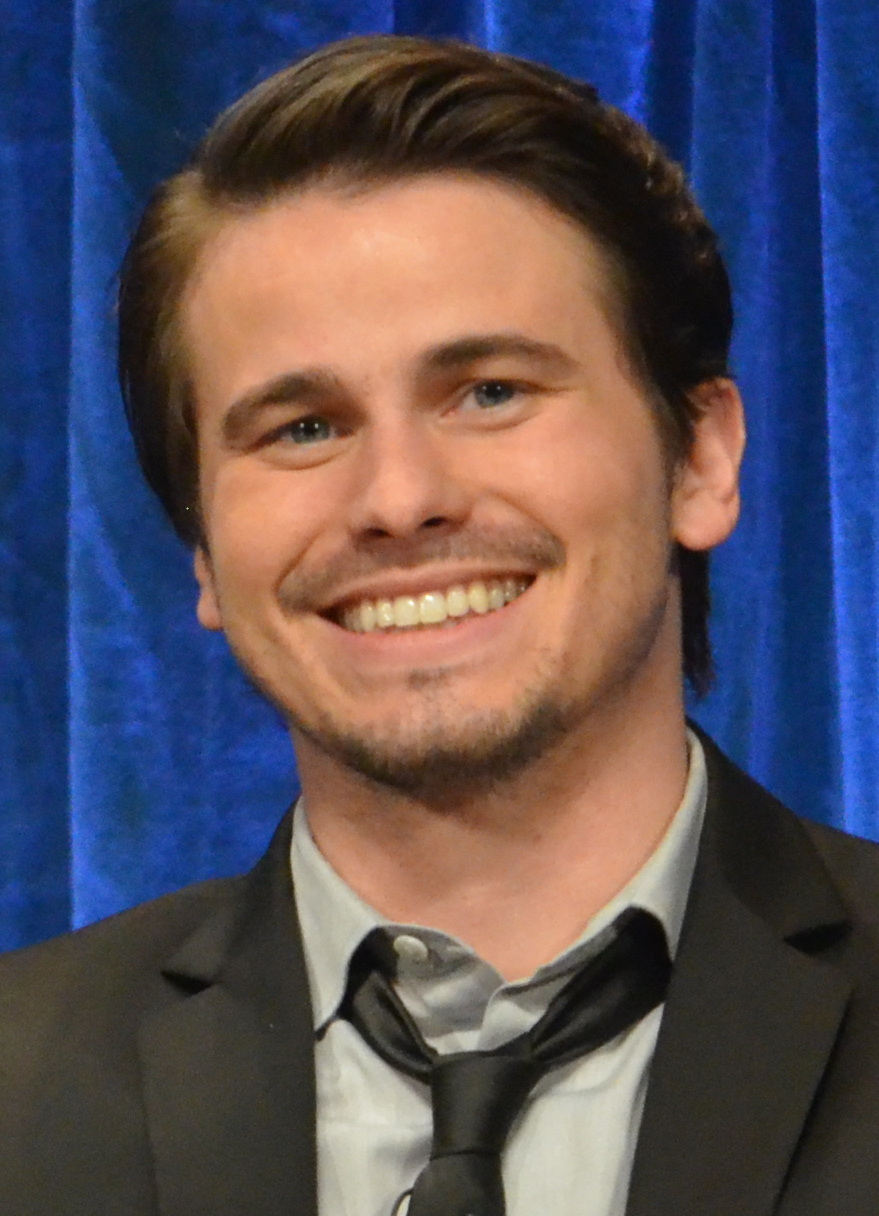
Jason Ritter voiced Dipper in the series.

Coming from Piedmont, California, Dipper and his twin sister Mabel are forced to spend their summer with their Great Uncle (Grunkle) Stan in the fictional town of Gravity Falls, Oregon. He is portrayed as smart, logical, yet sometimes awkward. He is interested in mysteries and shows expertise in various areas of knowledge like history, cryptography, and puzzle-solving.

Dipper first arrives in Gravity Falls bored and upset, but after he accidentally comes across a mysterious red journal in the forest around Gravity Falls, he begins to adjust to life in town and starts going on adventures with his sister to unravel the supernatural secrets of the town as told by the entries in the journal.

Starting with "The Inconveniencing", Dipper is shown to have a crush on 15-year-old Mystery Shack cashier Wendy Corduroy. However, accidents or supernatural phenomena usually sidetracked his attempts to win her over. In the episode "Into the Bunker", Wendy confirms her suspicions of Dipper's crush, and though she explains that even though she is too old for Dipper at that time, they remain close friends.

Throughout the series, Dipper wears a trademark white and blue cap with a symbol of a blue pine tree logo in the front of the hat, which he takes from the Shack's gift shop with his great-uncle ("Grunkle") Stan's permission. He also wears a navy-blue vest, reddish orange T-shirt, gray shorts, blue sneakers. "Double Dipper" reveals that his nickname comes from a birth mark on his forehead in the form of the Big Dipper, which he hides with his bangs.
