= Mike Rianda =

American cartoonist and animator (born 1984)

Michael Rianda
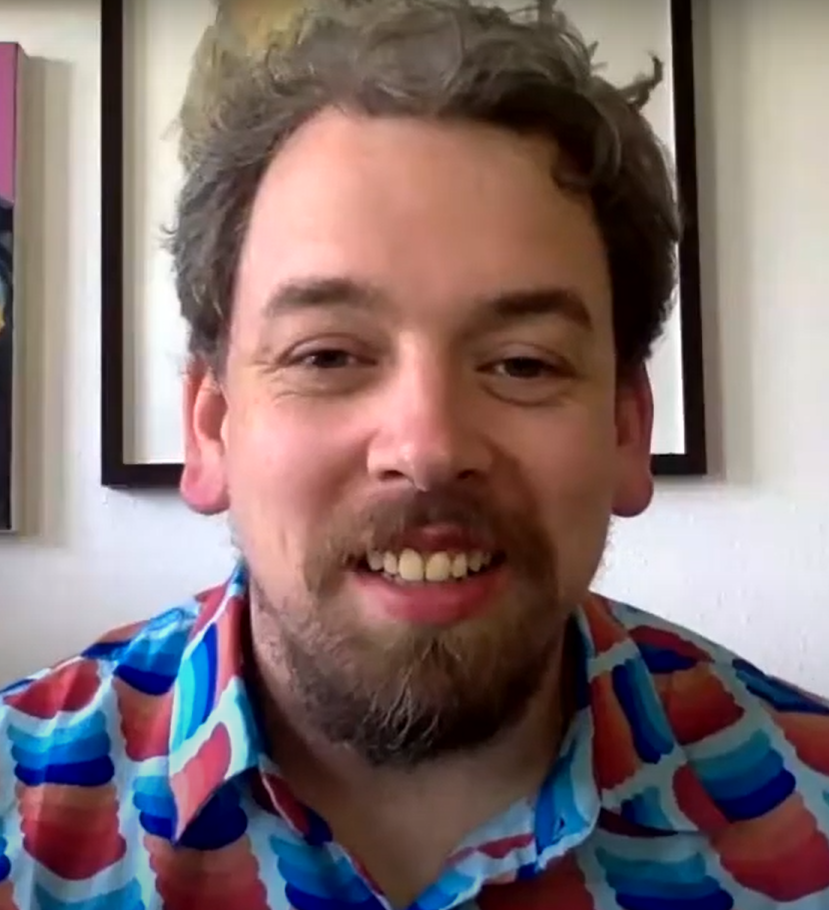
- Rianda in 2021
- Born: Michael Rianda; December 25, 1984 (age 41); Salinas, California, U.S.
- Education: California Institute of the Arts (BFA)
- Occupations: Cartoonist; director; screenwriter; voice actor
- Years active: 2008–present
- Notable credit: The Mitchells vs. the Machines

Michael Rianda (born December 25, 1984) is an American cartoonist, animator, director, screenwriter, and voice actor. He is known for his work on Gravity Falls as a creative director and writer for season 1, and creative consultant for season 2. He is also known for directing, co-writing, and co-starring his feature directorial debut The Mitchells vs. the Machines (2021), for which he was nominated for the Academy Award for Best Animated Feature.

== Early life and education ==
Rianda was born on December 25, 1984, in Salinas, California. He attended the California Institute of the Arts after he "drew and said amusing things" in school, studying character animation. Rianda also started writing and directing two short films at the animation school titled Everybody Dies in 90 Seconds (2008) and Work (2010).

== Career ==
He became a creative director and writer on the Emmy Award-winning Disney Channel animated television series Gravity Falls until his departure in 2013. Mike also voiced Lee, Thompson, Mr. Poolcheck, and additional voices. Rianda later returned and served as a creative consultant for its second season.

In 2021, along with Jeff Rowe, he is the co-director of the Sony Pictures Animation film The Mitchells vs. the Machines, he also additionally provided the major voice role for Aaron Mitchell and the talking dog, Furbies, and the Wi-Fi enthusiast. The film was released on Netflix on April 30, 2021.

== Filmography ==
=== Feature films ===
Year	Title	Director	Writer	Other	Voice	Notes
2021	The Mitchells vs. the Machines	Yes	Yes	Yes	Aaron Mitchell / Talking Dog / Furbies / Wi-Fi Enthusiast	
2021	Dog Cop 7: The Final Chapter	No	Yes	Yes	Aaron Mitchell / Detective Aaron / Sarge / Rick	Short film
2023	Spider-Man: Across the Spider-Verse	No	No	Yes	Ezekiel Sims / Spider-Therapist, cameo	Production consultant
2023	Teenage Mutant Ninja Turtles: Mutant Mayhem	No	No	Yes	Wants a Paycheck Goon / Chop Shop Boss / Ratatouille Guard	

=== Television ===
Year	Title	Writer	Other	Voice	Notes
2012–2016	Gravity Falls	Yes	Yes	Lee, Thompson, Mr. Poolcheck, Additional Voices	Creative director (season 1); Creative consultant (season 2)
2021	Inside Job	No	Yes	—N/a	Consultant (episode: "Unpresidented")
2022	Amphibia	No	Yes	—N/a	Special thanks (episode: "The Hardest Thing")

== Awards and nominations ==
Association	Year	Category	Work	Result	Ref(s)
Academy Awards	2022	Best Animated Feature	The Mitchells vs. the Machines	Nominated	
Annie Awards	2022	Outstanding Achievement for Directing in an Animated Feature	The Mitchells vs. the Machines	Won	
Annie Awards	2022	Outstanding Achievement in Writing for an Animated Feature	The Mitchells vs. the Machines	Won	
Hollywood Critics Association Midseason Awards	2022	Best Filmmaker	The Mitchells vs. the Machines	Nominated	
Hollywood Critics Association Midseason Awards	2022	Best Screenplay	The Mitchells vs. the Machines	Won	
Critics' Choice Movie Awards	2022	Best Animated Feature	The Mitchells vs. the Machines	Won	
British Academy Film Awards	2022	Best Animated Film	The Mitchells vs. the Machines	Nominated	
British Academy Children's Awards	2022	Best Feature Film	The Mitchells vs. the Machines	Nominated	
