= Alex Hirsch =

American animator (born 1985)

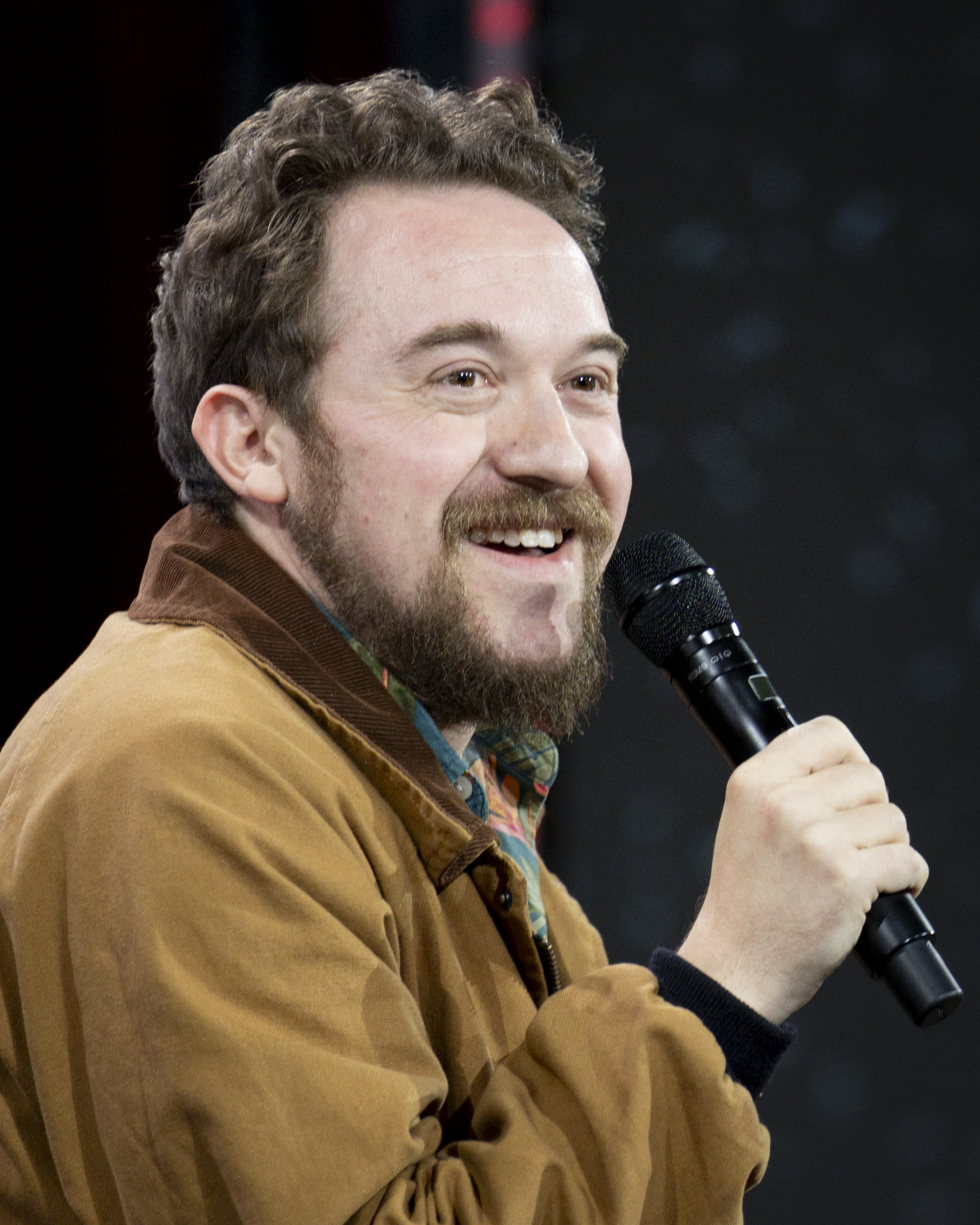
- Hirsch in 2026
- Born: Alexander Hirsch; June 18, 1985 (age 41); Piedmont, California, U.S.
- Education: California Institute of the Arts (BFA)
- Occupations: Animator; director; writer; producer; voice actor
- Years active: 2008–present

Alexander Hirsch (born June 18, 1985) is an American animator, director, writer, producer, and voice actor. He created the Disney Channel and Disney XD animated series Gravity Falls, and voiced its characters Grunkle Stan, Soos Ramirez, and Bill Cipher, among others. The show has won several BAFTA and Annie Awards.

In 2016, Hirsch co-authored Gravity Falls: Journal 3 which debuted as a No. 1 New York Times Best Seller and remained on The New York Times Best Seller list for forty-seven weeks. In 2018, Hirsch wrote Gravity Falls: Lost Legends which has also appeared on The New York Times Best Seller list. In 2024, Hirsch wrote The Book of Bill, which appeared on the Amazon and New York Times Best Seller's list.

== Early life and education ==
Hirsch was born alongside his twin sister Ariel on June 18, 1985 in Piedmont, California. Hirsch's father is Jewish, but he was raised agnostic, celebrating both Christmas and Hanukkah. Between the ages of 9 and 13, Hirsch and his twin sister would go stay with their great-aunt (or "graunty") Lois, at her cabin in the woods during the summer. These experiences later served as Hirsch's inspiration for Gravity Falls. He graduated from Piedmont High School where, as a junior, he won the school's annual Bird Calling Contest in 2002 and appeared on the Late Show with David Letterman.

Hirsch went on to attend the California Institute of the Arts (CalArts) where he created a variety of projects and short films including his senior film, Off The Wall, which combined animation and live action and "Cuddle Bee Hugs N'Such" with Adrian Molina, which was chosen by Nicktoons Network for their original series Shorts in a Bunch. He also spent the summer of 2006 in Portland, Oregon, storyboarding a later-scrapped animated film for Laika. He graduated in 2007 with a Bachelor of Fine Arts degree.

== Career ==
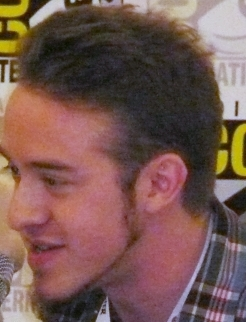
Alex Hirsch at the 2013 San Diego Comic-Con

=== Early career ===
Hirsch's first job after graduating from CalArts was as a writer and storyboard artist for the Cartoon Network series The Marvelous Misadventures of Flapjack, where he worked alongside CalArts alumni J. G. Quintel, Pendleton Ward (who was his writing partner on the show), and Patrick McHale. He would go on to develop the pilot for the Disney Channel series Fish Hooks along with Maxwell Atoms and future Rick and Morty creator Justin Roiland.

=== Gravity Falls ===
In 2012, Hirsch created the series Gravity Falls for Disney Channel. The series, set in the fictional town of Gravity Falls, Oregon, premiered in June 2012 with a voice cast including Jason Ritter, Kristen Schaal, and Hirsch himself. Over the course of the series, he provided the voices of Grunkle Stan, Soos Ramirez, Old Man McGucket, Bill Cipher, and various minor characters. The series was moved to Disney XD in 2014. It would go on to win a BAFTA Children's Award and an Annie Award in 2015 and was nominated for several other awards (including a Peabody Award in 2016). Hirsch ended Gravity Falls in February 2016 to pursue other projects.

In July 2016, Hirsch hosted a global treasure hunt (known as the "Cipher Hunt") for Gravity Falls fans with clues hidden throughout the world including in the United States, Japan, and Russia. The goal of the hunt was to find a statue of the Gravity Falls character, Bill Cipher. After two weeks, fans of the series discovered the statue in Reedsport, Oregon. The hunt coincided with the release of Hirsch's tie-in book, Gravity Falls: Journal 3, which was released on July 26, 2016, and eventually became a No. 1 New York Times Best Seller and appeared on The New York Times Best Seller list for nearly a year. A special edition of the book was released on June 13, 2017, and limited to 10,000 copies. The Gravity Falls: Journal 3 Special Edition contains blacklight writing, parchment pages, a monocle, removable photos and notes, and other features that were not included in the regular edition of the book. Marketing for The Book of Bill revealed that Gravity Falls: Journal 3 has sold more than 1.3 million copies as of January 2024.

In February 2018, Hirsch used his Twitter account to announce an official Gravity Falls graphic novel, through a series of puzzle pieces that he would release throughout the day. When put together, the puzzle pieces revealed the cover of Gravity Falls: Lost Legends; 4 All-New Adventures! which was written by Hirsch was released on July 24, 2018, and also became a New York Times Best Seller.

=== Other projects ===
Outside of Gravity Falls, Hirsch has done voice work for a number of projects including Phineas and Ferb, Rick and Morty, and as the announcer for the Chelsea Peretti special, One of the Greats. In August 2016, it was announced that Hirsch was in negotiations to co-write the live-action Pokémon film, Detective Pikachu, alongside Guardians of the Galaxy and Captain Marvel writer Nicole Perlman, but he later revealed on Twitter that he had no involvement with the film. Hirsch was a story contributor to Sony's animated Spider-Man film Spider-Man: Into the Spider-Verse (2018), but was uncredited.

On August 27, 2018, Hirsch signed a deal with American streaming company Netflix for a multi-year deal, according to Variety. Alex is currently in development on an unknown adult animated series for the company that remains NDA protected as of 2022 with no known release or announcement date as of yet. As of 2022, the show remains stuck in development.

=== Inside Job ===
Hirsch also co-executive produced the series Inside Job alongside creator and show-runner Shion Takeuchi. The first half of the first season premiered on October 22, 2021, with the second half releasing on November 18, 2022, with a second season being ordered on June 8, 2022. However, on January 8, 2023, Takeuchi announced that the series was cancelled, which a representative from Netflix confirmed.

=== The Owl House ===
Hirsch is the voice of King, Hooty, and additional voices in the Disney Channel animated series The Owl House, created by Dana Terrace. The show premiered on January 10, 2020.

=== The Book of Bill ===
In 2024 Hirsch wrote The Book of Bill, a Gravity Falls novel targeted at an adult audience. The book is written from Bill Cipher's perspective, and shows his origins and what happened to him after the end of the series. The Book of Bill debuted as an Amazon and No. 1 New York Times Best-Seller.

== Personal life ==
Gravity Falls was inspired by Hirsch's childhood and his relationship with his twin sister, Ariel Hirsch, growing up during their summer vacations. He placed many of his real-life experiences in the show, such as living in Piedmont and trick-or-treating with his sister as kids. Dipper Pines, one of the lead characters of Gravity Falls, is based on Hirsch's memory of how it felt to be a kid. When Hirsch was around Dipper's age, he attempted to teach himself backward speech by reversing recordings of his own voice. Hirsch described himself as "that neurotic kid who would carry 16 disposable cameras everywhere I went." The character Mabel Pines was inspired by Ariel. According to Hirsch, Ariel "really did wear wacky sweaters and have a different ridiculous crush, every week" in a similar fashion to Mabel. In the series Mabel acquires a pet pig, just like Ariel had always wanted when she was a child. The character of Grunkle Stan was inspired by Hirsch's grandfather Stan, who according to him "was a guy that told tall tales and would frequently mess with us to get a rise out of us."

From 2015 to sometime before April 2022, Hirsch was in a relationship with The Owl House creator Dana Terrace.

Hirsch has also cited media such as The Simpsons, Calvin and Hobbes, Twin Peaks, and The X-Files as influences for his work

=== Political views ===
In November 2020, Hirsch prank-called Rudy Giuliani's voter fraud hotline set up by the Donald Trump campaign, by using the voices of multiple Gravity Falls characters to report Hamburglar-esque ballot theft.

==== LGBTQ+ support ====
Hirsch has praised The Owl House for its LGBTQ+ characters, stating that he had been prohibited from incorporating explicitly LGBTQ+ characters into Gravity Falls.

Hirsch has been publicly critical of the Walt Disney Company, and has argued that, while Disney claims to support LGBTQ+ content, it does not live up to these claims. Hirsch has argued that Disney diminishes LGBTQ+ content by censoring or removing it to appeal to conservative viewers, by giving it less care, quality assurance, and merchandise, and limiting creative freedom in its television animation studios. He also noted frequent "ridiculous" notes from Disney's Standards and Practices department during the production of Gravity Falls, and the cancellation of an art book for that series, in 2020, without explanation.

== Filmography ==
=== Film ===
Year	Title	Writer	Voice actor	Other	Role	Notes
2018	Spider-Man: Into the Spider-Verse	Uncredited	No	Yes		Story Contributor
2019	The Angry Birds Movie 2	No	Yes	No	Steve Eagle (voice)	
2021	The Mitchells vs. the Machines	No	Yes	Yes	Dirk (voice)	Story Consultant
2023	The Super Mario Bros. Movie	No	No	Yes		Special Thanks
2023	Teenage Mutant Ninja Turtles: Mutant Mayhem	No	Yes	No	Scumbug, Boss Goon (voices)	
TBA	I, Chihuahua	Story	No	No		

=== Television ===
Year	Title	Creator	Executive Producer	Writer	Voice actor	Other	Role	Notes
2002	Late Show with David Letterman	No	No	No	No	Yes		Guest appearance as winner of Piedmont High School's Birdcaller Competition; Episode aired on June 19, 2002
2008–2009	The Marvelous Misadventures of Flapjack	No	No	Yes	No	Yes		Also storyboard artist
2010–2014	Fish Hooks	No	No	Yes	Yes	Yes	Clamantha, additional voices	Also creative consultant, storyboard artist and co-developer
2012–2016	Gravity Falls	Yes	Yes	Yes	Yes	Yes	Grunkle Stan, Soos Ramirez, Old Man McGucket, Bill Cipher, additional voices	
2013	Phineas and Ferb	No	No	No	Yes	No	Officer Concord the Juice Time Juice Box Flavor Cop	Episode: "Terrifying Tri-State Trilogy of Terror"
2015	Rick and Morty	No	No	No	Yes	No	Toby Matthews	Episode: "Big Trouble in Little Sanchez"
2016	Wander Over Yonder	No	No	No	Yes	No	Old Man, Soosy Du, additional voices	Episode: "The Cartoon"
2018	Star vs. the Forces of Evil	No	No	No	Yes	No	Ben Fotino	Episode: "Booth Buddies"
2018	We Bare Bears	No	No	No	Yes	No	Internet Troll	Episode: "Charlie's Halloween Thing 2"
2019	Big City Greens	No	No	No	Yes	No	Wyatt	Episode: "Park Pandemonium"
2020–2023	The Owl House	No	No	No	Yes	Yes	King, Hooty, additional voices	Also creative consultant
2020; 2022	Amphibia	No	No	No	Yes	Yes	The Curator, Frog Soos	Episode: "Wax Museum"; Special thanks, Episode: "The Hardest Thing"
2021	Kid Cosmic	No	No	Stories	No	No		2 episodes
2021	The Simpsons	No	No	No	Yes	No	Bill Cipher	Episode: "Bart's in Jail!"
2021–2022	Inside Job	No	Yes	Yes	Yes	No	Grassy Noel Atkinson, additional voices	
2024–2025	Tales of the Teenage Mutant Ninja Turtles	No	No	No	Yes	No	Scumbug	
2025	Chibiverse	No	No	No	Yes	No	Grunkle Stan, Soos Ramirez, Hooty	2 episodes
TBA	Lighthouse Bluff	Yes	—N/a	—N/a	—N/a	—N/a	TBA	Confirmed series in development at Netflix

=== Video games ===
Year	Title	Role
2014	Disney Infinity: Marvel Super Heroes	Shmebulock
2015	Disney Infinity 3.0	Additional voices
2022	The Stanley Parable: Ultra Deluxe	New Content announcer

=== Web ===
Year	Title	Role	Notes
2022	Homestar Runner: Strong Bad Emails	Himself	Episode: "Parenting"
2023–present	Bigtop Burger	Munkustrap	
2024	Animation Workers Ignited Shorts	Misterman Guyfella, Grunkle Stan, Bill Cipher, King	
2024	How NOT To Draw	Grunkle Stan, Bill Cipher	Episode: How Not To Draw Grunkle Stan
2026–present	Umbert Actually!	Misterman Guyfella	
2027	Clara and The Below	Chompers	YA animated indie web-series Main Role
TBA	BoxTown	Detective Tim Standing	Adult animated indie web-series Main Role

== Written works ==
Year	Title	Original publisher	ISBN	Notes
2016	Gravity Falls: Journal 3	Disney Press	ISBN 9781484746691	Co-written with Rob Renzetti; No. 1 The New York Times Best Seller; A special edition featuring black light ink on pages, a leather-textured cover with metallic pieces, a magnifying glass, removable photos/notes and an autograph from Hirsch was released on June 13, 2017. It was limited to 10,000 copies.
2018	Gravity Falls: Lost Legends	Disney Press	ISBN 1368021425; ISBN 978-1368021425	New York Times Best Seller; A Barnes and Noble exclusive edition with 16 additional pages of production art was also released.
2024	The Book of Bill	Hyperion Avenue Books	ISBN 1368092209; ISBN 978-1368092203	This is the first Gravity Falls book written specifically for adults. A Barnes & Noble exclusive edition featuring 16 extra pages and an autograph from Hirsch was also released. It is an Amazon and No. 1 The New York Times Best-Seller.
2026	The Art of Gravity Falls	Disney Press	ISBN 9781368119399	Co-written with Rob Renzetti; A Barnes & Noble exclusive edition featuring a replica of the letter Dipper received at the end of Weirdmageddon 3: Take Back the Falls will also be released.
2027	The Art of Over The Garden Wall: Expanded Edition	Dark Horse Comics	TBA	Foreword by.

== Nominations and awards ==
Year	Award	Category	Nominee	Result	Ref.
2015	42nd Annie Awards	Best Animated TV/Broadcast Production For Children's Audience	Gravity Falls	Won	
2015	20th British Academy Children's Awards	Best International Series	Gravity Falls	Won	
2016	43rd Annie Awards	Best Animated TV/Broadcast Production For Children's Audience	Gravity Falls	Nominated	
2016	43rd Annie Awards	Best Writing in an Animated TV/Broadcast Production	Alex Hirsch	Nominated	
2016	75th Annual Peabody Awards	Excellence in Children's/Youth Programming	Gravity Falls	Nominated	
2017	44th Annie Awards	Best Writing in an Animated TV/Broadcast Production	Alex Hirsch	Nominated	
