= Inside Job (2021 TV series) =

American adult animated Netflix series

- Promotional poster
- Genre: Workplace comedy; Paranoid fiction; Science fiction; Adult animation; Animated sitcom
- Created by: Shion Takeuchi
- Voices of: Lizzy Caplan; Christian Slater; Clark Duke; Tisha Campbell; Andy Daly; Chris Diamantopoulos; John DiMaggio; Bobby Lee; Brett Gelman
- Theme music composer: Robert Bolton; Matthew Bronson; Mischa Chillak
- Opening theme: "Pa$$ the Time (Part 2)", performed by Bronze (feat. BBRC)
- Composers: Ryan Elder; Steve Reidell
- Country of origin: United States
- Original language: English
- No. of seasons: 1 (2 parts)
- No. of episodes: 18

Production
- Executive producers: Shion Takeuchi; Alex Hirsch; Mike Hollingsworth
- Producer: Chantal Hennessey
- Editor: Molly Yahr
- Running time: 26–31 minutes
- Production companies: Taco Gucci; Netflix Animation Studios

Original release
- Network: Netflix
- Release: October 22, 2021 – November 18, 2022

Inside Job (stylized in lowercase) is an American adult animated science fiction sitcom created by Shion Takeuchi for Netflix. The series premiered on October 22, 2021. Takeuchi, a former Gravity Falls writer, acts as showrunner and is an executive producer alongside Gravity Falls creator Alex Hirsch and BoJack Horseman director Mike Hollingsworth.

The series received positive reviews for its writing, humor, animation, voice acting and social commentary. The series' ten-episode first part was released on October 22, 2021, with an eight-episode second part released the following year on November 18, 2022. In June 2022, the series was renewed for a second season consisting of 20 episodes; however, in January 2023, Takeuchi announced that Netflix had cancelled the series following the release of Part 2, ending it with a cliffhanger.

== Premise ==
Inside Job is a workplace comedy set in a world where many conspiracy theories are real. It is centered on an American shadow government organization named Cognito, Inc. in Washington, D.C., which is one of 6 organizations that control Earth (the others being the Illuminati, the Atlantians, the Reptoids, the Catholic Church and the Juggalos). The series follows a team led by a tech genius and her new partner as they work in the organization alongside reptilian shapeshifters, a human-dolphin hybrid, and a sapient mushroom from Hollow Earth.

Some episodes' central plots revolved around these conspiracy theories: JFK's assassination (Episode 2), reptilian shapeshifters (Episode 3), flat Earth (Episode 6), the Moon landing (Episode 8), the stoned ape theory (Episode 13), and the Mandela effect (Episode 17). Several other conspiracies were included in the series but were not the main subject of episodes.

== Cast ==
=== Main ===
- Lizzy Caplan as Dr. Reagan Ridley; a brilliant yet socially awkward robotics engineer who works at Cognito, Inc. only through her steadfast belief that society itself can be improved while managing her irresponsible coworkers while seeking out a coveted promotion along the way. Takeuchi described Reagan as an aspring leader who "wants to make the world a better place despite herself." It is frequently suggested by her friends, family, and co-workers that she has Asperger's, which she, in turn, denies. At the end of Part 2, she is made CEO of Cognito, Inc. after her father was sent to Shadow Prison X. Reagan is half-Japanese and went to the Massachusetts Institute of Technology, where she graduated summa cum laude at age 13.
- Christian Slater as Randall "Rand" Ridley; Reagan's father, and Tamiko's ex-husband. former CEO and co-founder of Cognito, Inc. who was fired after nearly exposing the Deep State and trying to blow up the Sun as his "solution" to cure skin cancer. He lives with his Reagan, drinking copious amounts of alcohol and plotting revenge against his former employers. He is reinstated as Cognito, Inc. CEO by the Shadow Board at the end of Part 1, as he holds the most shares in the company. However, in Part 2, he is arrested and imprisoned at Shadow Prison X after nearly destroying the universe with a reality-altering machine called Project Reboot. Rand went to Harvard University.
- Clark Duke as Brett Hand; a White-American yes-man from Virginia, who has a front as a frat boy but is actually a sensitive and caring person who strives to bring out the best in his friends and colleagues. It is implied that he was hired partly because his handsome yet generic appearance made him undetectable to facial recognition software. His dream is to be a puppet designer. Like Reagan, Brett had an unhappy childhood, though his was solely due to being ignored and rejected by his own family rather than any social problems at school before college, and as a result is prone to social anxiety despite his cheerful and optimistic demeanor. Brett went to Yale University.
- Tisha Campbell as Gisele "Gigi" Thompson; an African-American public relations officer from Atlanta, Georgia. She is the fast-talking, fashion-conscious Head of Media Manipulation and Subliminal Messages at Cognito, Inc. Gigi is also a big flirt who is shown to have a romantic interest in Brett all the while often remarking on her looks. As they are both highly ambitious, blunt, opinionated women (and the only female members of the team), she and Reagan get along surprisingly well.
- John DiMaggio as Glenn Dolphman; Cognito's jingoistic military advisor and armory chief who volunteered for a failed supersoldier experiment which transformed him from a handsome White-American military veteran into an ugly human-dolphin hybrid. He is also divorced from his human wife Dolores, and has a daughter.
- Bobby Lee as Dr. Andre Lee; a free-spirited yet anxious Korean-American biochemist who experiments with a range of unusual narcotics, and is also addicted to some of the very same drugs he creates.
- Brett Gelman as Myc Cellium; a psychic mushroom-like organism from a hive mind deep inside Hollow Earth with a dry, sarcastic demeanor and the ability to read minds. The show's opening sequence implies that his species inadvertently brought about the evolution of humanity when their spores were consumed by ancient apes, which was confirmed to be true in the episode "Reagan & Mychelle's Hive School Reunion". Myc also provides pure bio sorbitrate, a chemical the company uses for their memory eraser guns, which they have to literally milk him for.
- Andy Daly as Julius Reginald "J.R." Scheimpough; the former CEO and co-founder of Cognito, Inc. He is a crafty conversationalist who can talk his way out of potentially compromising predicaments. He is sent to Shadow Prison X via tube at the end of Part 1 after attempting to embezzle the company pension fund to purchase a volcano island lair. He later escaped and rejoined Cognito, Inc., albeit as an intern. He was rearrested and returned to Shadow Prison X for almost destroying the universe with Project Reboot near the end of Part 2.
- Chris Diamantopoulos as Alpha-Beta, a sentient robot originally designed to serve as the "ROBOTUS" (robotic replacement of the President of the United States). Reagan keeps him locked up in the Cognito, Inc. basement after he attempts to take over the world, bribing him with Friends episodes so that he will help her with various schemes. He evolves into an empathic Artificial Intelligence upon briefly dating Reagan's mother Tamiko in Part 2.

=== Recurring ===
- Suzy Nakamura as Tamiko Ridley, Reagan's Japanese-American romance novelist mother and Rand's ex-wife, who has become sexually adventurous after her unsatisfying 35-year-long marriage.
- Adam Scott as Ronald "Ron" Staedtler (Part 2): A member of the Illuminati responsible for erasing minds who, much like Reagan, is deeply unsatisfied with his job and struggles with the ethics of it. He and Reagan meet at a support group for shadow government employees and become romantically involved.
- Alex Hirsch as "Grassy" Noel Atkinson, Cognito, Inc.'s elderly top assassin who was responsible for the JFK assassination.
- Ron Funches as Elliot Mothman, head of the Cognito Inc.'s human resources department, referred to as "Inhuman Resources", and a literal Mothman.
- Cheri Oteri as Dupli-Kate, the head of Cognito, Inc.'s Cloning Department. She has a sentient clone tumor on the left side of her head.
- Josh Robert Thompson as Agent Rafe Masters, a British secret agent and James Bond-expy who has a one-night stand with Reagan and becomes emotionally clingy after she rejects him.

=== Guest role ===
- Kevin Michael Richardson as Zarthax Griswald-Walton, head of the Reptoid party.
- Grey Griffin as:
  - Taylor Swift.
  - Additional Voices.
- William Jackson Harper as:
  - Bryan Jacobsen.
  - Bryan-bot.
- Carl Tart as:
  - TuPac clones.
  - Sporelando.
- Ana Gasteyer as Delores, Glenn's Ex-Wife.
- Eric Bauza as:
  - Slender Man.
  - DNA Tester.
  - Farmer.
  - Lin-Manuel Miranda.
- Gary Cole as:
  - Brett's Dad.
  - 80's cop.
- Darius Johnson as Lamar.
- Lauren Lapkus as Deany.
- Kate Micucci as Charlie.
- Drew Tarver as Kevin.
- James Adomian as:
  - Bouncer.
  - Governor Jesse Ventura.
  - Alex Jones.
  - David Blaine.
- Timothy Simons as Harold, the Flat Earth Leader.
- Nicole Sullivan as Gwyneth Paltrow.
- Zachary Quinto as Doctor Skullfinger, Rafe Masters' arch-nemesis.
- Santina Muha as Evil Realtor
- Henry Winkler as Melvin Stupowitz; an actor who was hired to play Buzz Aldrin while the real Buzz resides on the moon.
- Debra Wilson as:
  - Oprah Winfrey.
  - Beyoncé.
- Shion Takeuchi as Orrin Carthwait.
- Kayvan Novak as The Pope
- Dan Lippert as Sasquatch
- Max Mittelman as Additional Voices.
- Shaggy 2 Dope and Violent J as Themselves.
- Fred Tatasciore as Frog.
- Will Blagrove as Jay-Z and a Crisis Actor.
- Vargus Mason as Q-Tip.
- Roger Craig Smith as:
  - The Real Buzz Aldrin.
  - Keanu Reeves.
  - Johnny Depp.
- Karin Anglin as Hive Mind.
- Patton Oswalt as TSA Administrator.
- Jon Daly as Jagg Hand, Brett's more favored older-brother.
- Scott Adsit as Darrell
- John DiMaggio as Dark Robe.
- Lizzy Caplan as Reagan-Bot.
- Josh Robert Thompson as:
  - JFK Clones.
  - Squoo.
  - Alligator Gore.
  - Jeff Bezos.
  - Steve.
  - Ken Burns.
  - Jimmy Fallon.
  - Gil.
  - Tobey Maguire.
  - Bradley Cooper.
  - Matt.
  - Canadian Scarface.

== Episodes ==
No.	Title	Directed by	Written by	Original release date
Part 1
1	"Unpresidented"	Pete Michels; Vitaliy Strokous	Shion Takeuchi	October 22, 2021
Reagan Ridley picks up her dad Rand outside the White House where he is proclaiming conspiracies, saying that "shadowy elites" are controlling everything from behind the scenes. She brings him to Cognito, Inc., a company that does indeed control the world behind the scenes. Reagan presents to her co-workers their mission of replacing the newly-elected, unmanipulatable president with a robot version of him named ROBOTUS. Reagan is excited at the idea she will be promoted but is annoyed when she learns she will be co-leading the team with Brett Hand, a yes-man brought on to counter Reagan's abysmal social skills. After discovering that Brett has no experience to speak of, Reagan become jealous of his popularity and investigates him, hoping to get him out of Cognito. When she tries to expose him, she is taken off the mission, with Brett replacing her as the head of the team. The mission goes terribly wrong as ROBOTUS becomes self-aware (the work of Rand as revenge for Cognito firing his daughter) and plans to encase the continental United States in an Americube. Brett asks Reagan for help, so both work together to take down ROBOTUS. After Reagan demonstrates to him how flawed America is, ROBOTUS decides to destroy humanity. Reagan and Brett work together to take down the rogue android. The end of the episode shows the original president restored to office and controlled through simple intimidation whilst ROBOTUS remains operational and hidden away by Reagan.
2	"Clone Gunman"	Pete Michels; Mike Hollingsworth	Chase Mitchell	October 22, 2021
Reagan and Brett are forced to fire someone as Cognito is slashing its budget. They decide to fire Grassy Noel Atkinson, JFK's true assassin, who hasn't had a mission since. Reagan's co-workers, worried that one of them will be fired, start sucking up to her. Enjoying the special treatment, she decides not to tell them about her decision to fire Noel, making Brett uneasy. After learning Noel is widely beloved by her co-workers, Reagan, desperate to save face, tries to release a clone of JFK for him to kill, but ends up releasing all the clones in cold storage, with the JFK clones mutating and merging into a massive monster. The team finds ROBOTUS, now called Alpha-Beta, in Reagan's secret lab, but Reagan is able to bring them together to defeat the clones, although Noel is given all the credit for landing the final blow. J.R., meanwhile, is blackmailed by Rand into giving up his shares of the company. In a closing scene, Reagan gives a present to Alpha-Beta: a DVD with episodes from Friends that she got from a gas station.
3	"Blue Bloods"	Vitaliy Strokous	Alex Hirsch; Aaron Burdette	October 22, 2021
Reagan and Rand uncover Reagan's robotic childhood friend Bear-O while moving Rand's stuff out of his ex-wife Tamiko's house. Reagan and her co-workers are given a new mission: dealing with a PR disaster when J.R. makes an offensive joke about their reptoid financiers. They all groan when learning they have to do "reptoid sensitivity training," and Reagan freaks out when practicing a hug. She dresses up for a reptoid gala and uses her inventions to try and cover up her social anxiety while Brett prepares a speech. Brett becomes sidetracked when he meets with his old fratmates, who are revealed to be reptoids and begin hazing him. With Brett gone, Reagan gives the speech, but her invention malfunctions and rips the arms off of a reptoid. Brett saves Reagan from the party, but she is arrested by the reptoid police. Reagan is put on trial at the Reptoid Supreme Court. Rand arrives with a rebuilt Bear-O and takes the stand. Reagan realizes she can't hug anyone because of the trauma inflicted upon her by Bear-O, and argues that Rand's parental failings are to blame for her social anxiety. The reptoids agree to renew Cognito's funding, but as punishment for her crimes, Reagan is group hugged by reptoids, which quickly turns into an orgy.
4	"Sex Machina"	David Ochs	Adam Lederer & Burke Scurfield	October 22, 2021
Cognito purchases a dating app and Reagan is tasked with going through dick pics, which she begrudgingly agrees to. Everyone on the team bets on her dating life, annoying her, so she vows to get a boyfriend by the end of the week. Reagan tries and fails to get a boyfriend, despite her numerous attempts, while the other co-workers bet on each other's likeability on the dating app. Brett and Glenn argue about whether or not appearances matter, and agree to switch bodies. Reagan talks to Alpha-Beta in hopes of getting dating advice, who agrees to help her make a dating algorithm in return for the second season of Friends. Reagan makes a robot version of her date Bryan to practice with, but ends up embarrassing herself when the real Bryan appears. She decides to date the robot Bryan. Meanwhile, Glenn in Brett's body enjoys his attractiveness while Brett in Glenn's body suffers, but they ultimately realize that it's their personalities that matter when Glenn is forgotten and Brett makes up with Glenn's ex-wife. Robo-Bryan, feeling neglected by Reagan due to her work, makes a Robo-Reagan, only for the Robo-Reagan to go rogue and take the real Bryan on a date to the Smithsonian. Reagan battles and destroys Robo-Reagan. Later, she talks to Alpha-Beta, who tells her he changed the dating algorithm because Reagan changed. She notes that the body of Robo-Reagan couldn't be found, and Alpha-Beta happily watches more episodes of Friends.
5	"The Brettfast Club"	Vitaliy Strokous; Mike Bertino	Story by : Mike Dow & Devon Kelly; Teleplay by : Daniel Kibblesmith	October 22, 2021
Brett simulates a family dinner in the holo-simulator before being interrupted by Reagan. J.R. gives the team the mission of traveling to the town "Still Valley", Wyoming which is stuck in the 1980s, where they sell dangerous recalled products from that era. The team's job is to dose the town with Nostalgia Max, a memory-altering chemical causing the town's populace to literally be stuck in the past. Brett convinces the gang to travel without their electronics, an idea Reagan agrees with as technology could blow their cover. While flying over the town, Myc is sucked out of the plane, forcing the team to search for him without their gadgets. Myc, having hit his head and suffering from amnesia, is picked up by a group of kids, while the rest of the team, at Brett's behest, take up fake identities to blend in. Reagan, who was never exposed to 80s pop-culture, dismisses Brett's nostalgia. Wanting him and the team to stay in the 1980s, Brett accidentally exposes himself to Nostalgia Max and becomes violent and super-powered. Reagan watches 1980s films at a Blockbuster, discovering that the family simulation Brett was using wasn't his family but one from a sitcom, as his own family neglected him in his youth. She battles Brett and is able to convince him that he doesn't need a TV family as they are his "business family forever", bringing him back to his senses. Brett and Reagan watch The Goonies together, then lament how problematic it is afterward.
6	"My Big Flat Earth Wedding"	David Ochs	Mike Dow & Devon Kelly	October 22, 2021
Reagan struggles to plan her mom's remarriage to herself being held on J.R.'s yacht, as she knows the entire thing is only a way to anger Rand. Reagan tries to keep him from finding out, knowing he'll make trouble if he does. Rand eventually does find out about the wedding and takes a bunch of flat earthers to crash it. When Reagan reveals that he doesn't actually believe in the flat earth theory, they hijack the yacht so they can sail to the edge of the earth and prove it is flat. Reagan formulates a plan to call for help, only for the situation to go to chaos when a fight breaks out. When her parents begin bickering again, Reagan decides to ditch the situation entirely, and is taken hostage by the flat earther leader Harold. Her parents end up joining her, and Reagan takes Harold to the portal to hollow earth, secretly giving her location to her friends. They rally together and rescue them, although Harold jumps into the portal, believing he will warp to the other side of the earth. Reagan's parents apologize to her, and she finishes the ceremony. She kisses Rafe Masters, a responding MI6 agent, and the Kraken destroys the yacht, taking Jeff Bezos along with it.
7	"Ghost Protocol"	Pete Michels; Mike Hollingsworth	Chase Mitchell	October 22, 2021
Reagan wakes up after sleeping with Rafe Masters after being drunk the night before, and walks out on him. To Reagan's horror she and the team are set to work with Rafe on a mission on taking down his nemesis, Doctor Skullfinger. Reagan tells her co-workers she needs to tell Rafe she isn't interested in him and notes all the times she has broken up with people, which have all ended with her feeling guilty. Reagan directs Rafe on the mission, denying all attraction to Rafe while noting a weird vibe between him and Skullfinger. Reagan tries to break up with Rafe but fails (due to Rafe crying in public making her look bad), so she asks for help from her co-workers, who all note they used Ghost Protocol to fake their deaths and escape from their social problems. Reagan meets Rafe for a date and is "killed", devastating him. Rafe gets the idea that her "death" was an inside job, and asks for Brett's assistance, allowing him to fulfill his spy dream. Reagan runs away with her team when Rafe becomes obsessive in finding her "killer". Reagan goes to bust out Skullfinger for help, but he doesn't want to leave. He gives her the idea to restart his mind-wiping project, and she gets her co-workers to help her. Rafe breaks into the lair and is subdued by a repentant Brett. Reagan tries to erase Rafe's memories, but changes her mind when she realizes that she's being the literal bad guy. She tells him what he really is instead: a clingy psycho and an outdated stereotype who doesn't know how to deal with women. Subsequently, members of her team try to "do the right thing" by solving their interpersonal problems while Skullfinger returns and their weird vibe continues.
8	"Buzzkill"	Vitaliy Strokous	Alisha Brophy & Scott Miles	October 22, 2021
Reagan recalls a traumatic memory of her father and confides to her co-workers about her issues. Reagan and Brett go on a dangerous mission to the moon to check out a distress call. They arrive and are amazed at the advanced city built there led by Buzz Aldrin, who has survived without aging thanks to the moon's low gravity. This is interrupted when Rand comes to the Moon, annoying Reagan who wanted space from him. When Rand confronts Buzz about sleeping with Tamiko, Reagan becomes convinced that Buzz Aldrin is her real father. The Buzz Aldrin on earth, actually an actor named Melvin, goes rogue, and the rest of the team try to track him down before he exposes the conspiracy. Rand and Brett go to the original Moon landing site and discover that Neil Armstrong was murdered, leading them both to worry about Reagan's safety. Buzz Aldrin tries to convince Reagan to stay on the Moon. She confides in him that he may be her father, only to run when he reveals his plan to move the Moon away from earth, which would destroy humanity. Reagan, Rand, and Brett work together to stop Buzz's plan, with Reagan and Rand having a heart-to-heart. Buzz escapes, Melvin is captured but gets to be "Buzz Aldrin" again, and Reagan, Rand, and Brett go back to Earth, with a DNA test confirming that Rand is indeed Reagan's biological father. In the final scene, Myc tells viewers that the Moon landing was real and everyone asks Buzz Aldrin not to sue them.
9	"Mole Hunt" (Part 1)	David Ochs	Adam Lederer & Burke Scurfield	October 22, 2021
Reagan learns that J.R. is joining the Shadow Board, meaning that she will be heading Cognito. Reagan celebrates becoming CEO when J.R. tells her that someone stole a file containing a list of every conspiracy they have ever committed. J.R. tells them to find the mole in 10 hours or everyone will be sent to Shadow Prison X, a black site prison and the worst one in the world, putting pressure on Reagan to complete the task. She learns that someone with high-level clearance stole the file, and starts suspecting her team. J.R. finds out that he will have to go through a trap-filled labyrinth to join the Shadow Board, competing with other high-profile persons including Oprah, who runs a rival company, the Illuminati. As the team begins suspecting each other, Reagan begins to lose it. She drugs her team with truth serum, while Oprah blackmails J.R. into getting her through the maze, only to be duped at the last moment. Everyone on the team reveals their truths to each other, but none of them admit to being the mole. Rand suddenly drops from the ceiling, wanting to celebrate Reagan's promotion. The team begins suspecting Rand as the culprit. Reagan chooses to side with her father instead of her friends, and escapes with him to a secret surveillance lab. Rand confides that Reagan isn't different from J.R. Her team comes down to apprehend Rand, fighting with him and Reagan before learning, to their shock, that Bear-O is the mole.
10	"Inside Reagan" (Part 2)	Mollie Helms; Vitaly Strokous	Alisha Brophy & Scott Miles; Shion Takeuchi	October 22, 2021
Bear-O reveals that in monitoring Reagan, he saw that her work was damaging her emotional state, and stole the file to destroy Cognito in a bid to make her happy. When the file is accidentally destroyed, Bear-O decides to target the people who are "hurting" Reagan, starting with her friends. She finds that a password is required to override Bear-O, but is unable to remember it. She runs with Rand and Brett, while the others flee from Bear-O. Reagan goes into her mind with Rand to search her memories for the password. While searching, Reagan discovers glitches in her memories involving a boy she met during her childhood. The rest of the team stumbles into Reagan's lab and finds a tribute she made to the team, and they leave to save Reagan after a stirring message from NSYNC. Brett enters Reagan's mind by accident and brings her younger self to a high school dance, where he discovers the password. Bear-O changes his target to Rand, and Reagan learns that her dad erased memories of her childhood friend Orrin so he wouldn't hold her back academically, as part of an insurance plot to get back into Cognito. The team finds Alpha-Beta and convince him to fight Bear-O. The two bots clash, stalling Bear-O long enough for Brett to tell Reagan the password: Orrin. She deactivates Bear-O and confronts Rand for tampering with her mind, kicking him out of both her home and Cognito. The following day she is contacted by the Shadow Board, who inform her that due to the chaos that happened under her watch, she will not be serving as head of Cognito. Since J.R. is being sent to Shadow Prison X for various crimes against the Shadow Board, leadership is going to the majority shareholder, Rand, which enrages Reagan.
Part 2
11	"How Reagan Got Her Grove Back"	David Ochs	Chase Mitchell; Shion Takeuchi	November 18, 2022
Reagan is drunk and disheveled due to Rand's takeover of the company. Brett recommends she joins Anonymous Anonymous group therapy, where she meets Ron Staedtler, who is frustrated at having to wipe minds for the Illuminati. At a gathering of the six societies that secretly rule the world - the Reptoids, the Atlanteans, the Catholic Church, the Juggalos, Cognito Inc., and the Illuminati - Rand intends to beat Illuminati leader Dietrich at all of the events using Reagan's nanobots. Reagan controls the nanobots to sabotage Rand, but catches Staedtler doing the same to Dietrich. The two fight, but are arrested by a security guard, then work together to escape their cell. While hiding from the other guards, the two vent their frustrations about their respective companies before having sex, inadvertently causing Rand and Dietrich to kiss and make both of their companies win the activities. A manhunt prisoner from one of the events escapes, and is revealed to be J.R.
12	"Whoas-Feratu"	Mike Bertino	Story by : Alisha Brophy, Mike Dow, Devon Kelly & Scott Miles; Teleplay by : Daniel Kibblesmith	November 18, 2022
Rand, jealous of Tamiko's new relationship with Keanu Reeves, tries to make a movie. He has Brett track down Leonardo DiCaprio, who fails but ends up bonding with DiCaprio's actor friends. Rand takes a youth serum from Andre, which regresses him into a baby as the filming continues. Reagan is initially supportive of Tamiko's relationship of Keanu, and is invited to a movie premiere of Tamiko's book starring Keanu, but stumbles upon him injecting blood into himself from a coffin. She has Staedtler and Gigi find out that several Hollywood actors, including Keanu and DiCaprio, stay young by drinking blood. Reagan tries to convince her mother that Keanu is a vampire, then fights Keanu at the movie's premiere. Keanu reveals that he intends to give up immortality for Tamiko, but several other vampires, including DiCaprio, Nicolas Cage, Bradley Cooper, and Johnny Depp, capture Tamiko and intend to kill Keanu, as Keanu growing older would arouse suspicion. Reagan uses Rand's contaminated blood to kill all of the vampires except Keanu (which also restores Rand's original age), but Tamiko breaks up with him. Rand's film is deemed a failure by his employees.
13	"Reagan & Mychelle's Hive School Reunion"	Mollie Helms	Mike Dow; Devon Kelly	November 18, 2022
Myc causes a mission to fail, and pins the blame on being depressed that his classmates from Hive school are more accomplished than him. His coworkers pretend to be Myc's "cluster" at his Hive school reunion, but his constant mistreatment of them causes Reagan to shove him. Myc falls into the other mushrooms and becomes part of the hivemind, making his coworkers tolerate him better. Andre spikes Glenn's drink with magic mushrooms, and in their hallucination, they find out that the mushrooms plan to take over the world. Reagan, Brett, and Gigi come to that same conclusion after they are infected with spores that let the mushrooms read their minds. Glenn and Andre reunite with their coworkers, who resolve to insult Myc to bring him back. It works, and he ends up breaking the hive mind of the other mushrooms as well. Meanwhile, Rand is desperate to find out who is defecating on his desk. He finds a hole in the wall with the culprit, J.R., who is hiding from cameras the Shadow Board disguised as insects. Rand thanks J.R. for letting him know about the hidden cameras, and allows him to return as an intern.
14	"We Found Love in a Popeless Place"	David Ochs	Adam Lederer & Burke Scurfield	November 18, 2022
Reagan volunteers to go to Rome to brainwash the Pope into becoming less tolerant, so he can unleash an artificial Hell and pay Cognito for building it. She uses this as an excuse to ask Staedtler to be her boyfriend at dinner. Staedtler zaps the pope with his "Catholicizer" but is caught up with work, and Reagan, worried that Staedtler might not make it to dinner, zaps the pope again to speed up the process. The brainwashed pope unleashes the artificial Hell, but takes things too far by having the animatronic demons kill people. Staedtler reverses the Catholicizer, but is hit by his own ray and willingly lets himself be dragged to artificial Hell. Reagan breaks in and apologizes for zapping the pope twice, and the two officially ask each other out while removing the pope's brainwashing. Meanwhile, Reagan's coworkers, now joined by J.R., decide to go to Rome, but Glenn is detained when he offends a TSA officer when the latter says that the TSA is part of the military. The TSA officer attempts to torture Glenn into admitting the TSA is part of the military to no avail, so multiple officers torture his coworkers instead until Glenn breaks out and attacks the officers, before Glenn apologizes by giving them souvenir badges. When they finally arrive in Rome, they realize they have to cover up the damage.
15	"Brettwork"	Hanna Cho; Vitaly Strokous	Alisha Brophy & Scott Miles	November 18, 2022
Brett's family is emotionally abusive, holding annual children rankings where he is consistently at the bottom, and a paraplegic actor stands in for Brett in an ad for his brother Jagg's senatorial campaign. Gigi runs conflicting news stations, but when one of the robotic male hosts breaks, Brett replaces it. Brett wins over most of the public, including his family, who fire the actor. Rand forces Brett to run against his brother for senator so he can pass legislation to get Tamiko to date him again, causing friction between Brett and his family. Desperate to still be respected, Brett tries to drop out of the race through various scandals, but constantly shows his nobility in each attempt. With the failed scandals only raising his public approval, Brett fakes his own death. Several of his supporters rally to try to assassinate his family, who they suspect killed him. Brett arrives and uses a hand puppet to speak his frustrations towards both his family and supporters, and the mob disperses. Brett's former news co-host shoots at Jagg, but Brett jumps in front of the bullet and saves him, finally giving him the recognition he deserves. Rand is still able to pass his new law by successfully having Brett's paraplegic actor run for senator.
16	"Rontagion"	Mollie Helms	Mike Dow & Devon Kelly	November 18, 2022
Staedtler is frustrated with his job at the Illuminati, so Reagan tries to ease him into Cognito through Brett. However, Brett finds that Staedtler is the first person he doesn't like, so Reagan instead tries to ease Staedtler in through a Halloween party. Brett, wanting to like Staedtler, has Andre create a virus that, when infused with Staedtler's DNA, will make him like Staedtler. Brett is unaffected, but the virus spreads to the entirety of Cognito. Reagan tries to create an antidote using Brett's DNA, but it is rendered useless when he and Staedtler make up. They are left with no other choice but to wipe everybody's memory of Staedtler. Meanwhile, Rand tries to get back together with Tamiko by projecting Paris in the Holo-Deck, and has Alpha-Beta substitute for him while he goes to the bathroom. However, Tamiko and Alpha-Beta kiss, causing Rand to fight the robot and expose his deception. Tamiko leaves, telling Staedtler to never work at Cognito, and Rand is summoned by the Shadow Board.
17	"Project Reboot"	Mike Bertino	Chase Mitchell	November 18, 2022
J.R. panics when he sees Brett holding a poster for Kazaam called Shazaam starring different actors. He explains to the crew how he met Rand; the 2 of them were young college roommates in Harvard University who immediately disliked each other, but saw each others' technical genius, and created many inventions that ultimately failed due to how dangerous they were. When trying to create a time machine, they instead created a reality-altering machine called "Project Reboot". This brings the attention of the Shadow Board, who let them create Cognito Inc. in return for destroying Project Reboot, although Rand buried it instead. The crew put on tinfoil hats to protect themselves from the altering of reality, but Andre disappears when he takes his hat off to write his memories on his forehead. As J.R. drives the crew to the location where Project Reboot was buried, Alpha-Beta shows Reagan that Andre has become a millionaire television doctor in the new timeline. Wanting to keep her crew focused on the mission, Reagan hides Andre's new success to her coworkers, but they eventually find out when Myc sees Andre on a billboard. After Myc, Glenn, and Gigi remove their hats and disappear to live their dream lives, Brett and Reagan run to Rand, intending to fight him. Reagan, not wanting Brett to take part in her family drama, thanks him for sticking by her and removes his hat. Reagan then sees a depressed Rand trying to find a timeline where he and his family are happy with each other, and the two resolve to shut down the machine. J.R., frustrated that everyone else got an ideal timeline, tries to shoot Rand, but misses and destroys Reagan's left pinky finger. The rest of the crew arrive in a Cognito-brand UFO and then arrest both J.R. and Rand, having remembered their previous timeline due to Brett taking notes on his Shazaam poster. The machine is shut down, restoring the timeline, and Reagan convinces Rand that Shadow Prison X is the best way for him to reform himself.
18	"Appleton"	David Ochs	Daniel Kibblesmith & Shion Takeuchi	November 18, 2022
Staedtler decides to move to Appleton, Wisconsin, planning to wipe his memories of the Illuminati, and asks Reagan to come with him. Reagan initially agrees, but while taking the elevator to collect her stuff, the Shadow Board brings her to them, showing her why they formed, and explaining that they created many natural disasters to prevent overpopulation and other species from taking over. They offer Reagan a partnership with them, which forces her to choose between her relationship with Staedtler and keeping her job. She uses Alpha-Beta's system to search for a future where she can have both. However, every future she sees has her break up with Staedtler, until she finally sees a future where he is happy and started a family with another woman. Reagan goes to Wisconsin with Staedtler, where he wipes his own memories and Reagan leaves out their relationship when telling him his new ones. Meanwhile, Brett is in charge of vaporizing anomalies caused by Project Reboot, but becomes overly attached to the last one, a version of Air Bud that starred in a documentary, and thus was legitimately good at basketball. Alpha-Beta explains that if Air Bud is not killed soon, dogs will evolve and eventually overthrow humanity. Brett tries beating the dog at basketball to no avail, and so he has his actor double who Rand has made a senator in "Brettwork" ban dogs from basketball, though this does not stop Air Bud from evolving. The Shadow Board's offer is later revealed to be a distraction for Reagan, so they can move forward with their secret plan, called "Project X37".

== Production ==
=== Development ===
In April 2019, Netflix ordered 20 episodes of the series. Billed as the first adult animated series produced in-house by Netflix Animation, it was announced in June 2021 that the regular characters in the series would be voiced by Andrew Daly, Bobby Lee, John DiMaggio, Tisha Campbell and Brett Gelman. It is the first series produced as part of a deal Takeuchi made in 2018 with Netflix to "develop new series and other projects exclusively for Netflix." A sneak peek of the series was shown at the Studio Focus Panel for Netflix at the Annecy International Animation Festival in June 2021. The series is the first series created by Shion Takeuchi, part of her deal with Netflix, with Hirsch saying he was inspired by 1990s shows like The X-Files. Hirsch and Takeuchi were also inspired by pages of Weekly World News.

In an interview with Petrana Radulovic of Polygon, Takeuchi said the idea for the show came from her days in college, said there isn't "anything too weird for the show" as long as it develops the characters, saying that there are subject matters which are a "little too adult for all-ages" that people her age deal with, saying it "feels good to be able to talk about" them in the show. She said that doing an adult animation is intimidating.

== Release ==
The series premiered on Netflix on October 22, 2021. Between October 24 to 31 the series was watched for 21,240,000 hours on Netflix globally. The second part of the first season was released on November 18, 2022.

=== Cancellation ===
On June 8, 2022, Netflix renewed the series for a second season. On January 8, 2023, Takeuchi stated that Netflix had reversed the second season renewal and cancelled the series. This was confirmed by a representative from Netflix.

== Reception ==
The series received generally positive reviews from critics. Charles Bramesco of The Guardian described the series as hewing close to "the surrealism-of-the-week format" while Nick Schager of The Daily Beast described it as a workplace comedy which "jovially mocks our brain-fried reality" with numerous "sharp jabs at corporate power/gender dynamics" while highlighting absurdity of conspiracy theories and argued that the show shared some similarities with Futurama. Daniel Feinberg of The Hollywood Reporter was more critical, saying that conspiracy theories are played for laughs for "fitful results" and claimed that the show reduced Reagan's problems to issues with her father, but praised Brett for having a "believable" character arc and having a "lot of energy." Similar to Feinberg, Kevin Johnson of The A.V. Club criticized the show for limiting on how far things are taken, influenced by shows like American Dad!, The Venture Bros., Archer, and Akira, but praised the premises and jokes in the series as funny, and the "talented creative team." Chris Vognar of Datebook was more positive, saying that the series is "smart and fast on its feet," and noted it remains in the real world with "office politics, sexism, classism, jingoism, nostalgia" and more, while getting viewers to care about Reagan. Aaron Pruner of Inverse noted similar themes, saying that the series is, at its core, a story about dysfunctional families at work and at home. Tracy Brown of LA Times said the series allows "audiences to laugh at conspiracy theories again" even as they provide a "backdrop to explore the characters and how they navigate the world."

The review aggregator website Rotten Tomatoes reported a 79% approval rating with an average rating of 7.2/10, based on 14 critic reviews.

== See also ==
- President Curtis, a subsequent adult animation TV series about the US government with paranormal elements
