= Gravity Falls: Lost Legends =

2018 graphic novel by Alex Hirsch

- Date: July 24, 2018
- Publisher: Disney Press

Creative team
- Artists: Asaf Hanuka; Dana Terrace; Ian Worrel; Jacob Chabot; Joe Pitt; Jim Campbell; Kyle Smeallie; Meredith Gran; Mike Holmes; Priscilla Tang; Serina Hernandez; Stephanie Ramirez; Valerie Halla
- Creator: Alex Hirsch

Original publication
- Language: English
- ISBN: 9781368021425

Gravity Falls: Lost Legends is a graphic novel published by Disney Press, based on the animated television series Gravity Falls. Written by series creator Alex Hirsch, the comics in the book are illustrated by various artists, including Asaf Hanuka and Dana Terrace. The comics explores four new adventures taking place within the show's continuity. A second book, The Book of Bill, was published in 2024.

First announced at the fifth D23 Expo in July 2017, the book was released on July 24, 2018, alongside the complete series box set. Barnes and Noble released a special exclusive edition as well which includes 16 extra pages with behind the scenes production art and drawings from the book. Lost Legends was generally positively received by fans, with praise for its "brilliant application" of the comic medium. The book appeared on The New York Times Best Seller list in August 2018.

== Plot ==
The story begins with narration by Shmebulock the gnome. Because he is only able to say his own name, the other gnomes believe he is stupid and ridicule him. In actuality, his impediment was caused by a curse from an evil warlock, and once every millennium, he is able to speak fluent English. Shmebulock tells the reader four tales about the Pines family and their untold adventures.

=== Face It ===
Stanford Pines puts Dipper in charge of looking after his journals while he searches for the Mothman, who owes him money. A little later, Pacifica Northwest shows up at the door and asks Dipper if she can look for information in the journals to remove a wrinkle for an upcoming photoshoot with her parents. Knowing how dangerous the journals are, Dipper refuses to help, so Pacifica sneaks into the twins' bedroom to view the journals. She summons a monster called Mr. What's-His-Face, who promises to give her a flawless face. Pacifica accepts his deal, but their exchange is interrupted by the twins. Mr. What's-His-Face steals Mabel's face instead of Pacifica's, then flees.

Dipper and Pacifica track the monster into the Crawlspace, a paranormal black market underneath the town. Dipper tricks Pacifica into covering herself with garbage in order to blend in with the paranormal creatures. During an argument, they are caught by other monsters and sold to an unknown buyer. While in the burlap sack, Dipper assures Pacifica that she is "more than just a pretty face" after she reveals her insecurity with regard to her appearance due to pressure from her parents.

Finding themselves at Mr. What's-His-Face's study, the two demand to have Mabel's face back, but he instead steals Dipper's face. Facing a choice on whether to have an everlasting beautiful face or fight him to get back the twins' faces, Pacifica sets Mr. What's-His-Face's head on fire by tossing explosive beauty pills at him. The three escape into an outhouse, where Ford incapacitates the monster with a freeze ray. With little time left to clean herself up, Pacifica decides not to care about her appearance and attends the shoot covered in trash, which disgusts her parents.

=== Comix Up ===
Soos brings his collection of comic books to the Mystery Shack and shares them with Dipper, Mabel, and Wendy. However, Stanley confiscates Soos's collection due to his disdain for comic books and locks them in a cursed chest. A malicious narration box follows Stan around and traps him inside one of the comic books. Dipper, Soos, Mabel, Ford, and Wendy go into the book and enter a world of shifting art styles and genres. They chase a mysterious purple man, believing that he knows Stan's whereabouts. After they corner the purple man, he sets off a bomb that sends everyone flying out of the story's panels and into the margins.

Soos finds Stan in a comic called Li'l Stanley, which Stan created as a child, but the comic was rejected by publishers due to its excessive use of profanity, causing him to resent the medium. Soos urges Stan to continue his childhood dream and apologize to the cursed chest, but Stan refuses to refer to the medium as "graphic novels". The narration box attempts to kill Stan and Soos, but Ford, Wendy, Dipper, and Mabel appear, and Mabel defeats the narration box with white-out. After the group returns to the real world, Stan reproduces his childhood comic and sells copies of it in the Shack's gift shop.

=== Don't Dimension It ===
During an expedition through the forest of Gravity Falls to check for leftover dimensional rifts in the aftermath of Weirdmageddon, Mabel falls into a wormhole while retrieving her pig Waddles, prompting Stan and Ford to enter it in order to find her. She ends up in a pocket dimension, along with other lost Mabels of the multiverse. However, all of the other Mabels are preoccupied with their own tasks, so none of them are willing to help Mabel return to her dimension. She meets another Mabel who resembles her and shares her determination to leave the dimension. The two Mabels work together to retrieve a flare gun and manage to alert Stan and Ford to their location. However, the other Mabel locks Mabel into an outhouse, revealing herself to be Anti-Mabel, "the most evil Mabel in the multiverse", and intends to take Mabel's place in her dimension and conquer the dimension itself. Stan and Ford arrive and pick up Anti-Mabel. Leaving the outhouse, Mabel tries to get help from the other Mabels but becomes aggravated when they are too preoccupied to help. Realizing how similar their selfish behavior is to her own past actions, Mabel manages to rally the other Mabels to help her defeat Anti-Mabel.

While on the way back to their dimension, Anti-Mabel overpowers Stan and Ford and reveals herself as an imposter. The other Mabels arrive, fight Anti-Mabel, and rescue Stan and Ford. Anti-Mabel is defeated and ejected into space. Dropping the Pines off at the rift leading back to their dimension, the other Mabels thank them for their help before returning to their home dimensions, and Stan and Ford seal the rift. Mabel apologizes to Dipper for her past mistakes and gives him a new journal, which was given to her by Mabipper. She expresses her hope of starting new adventures with Dipper.

=== The Jersey Devil's in the Details ===
In the 1960s, a younger Stan and Ford plan to spend the summer going on adventures and working on their new boat, the Stan-O-War, but their dreams are dashed when their father, Filbrick, discovers his gold chain is missing and accuses Stan of stealing it. Stan says he could not have stolen the chain because he was spending time with Ford all day, and Ford defends him. Filbrick tells his sons that if they cannot find and return the chain within 24 hours, Stan will be grounded for the rest of the summer.

Ford analyzes the clues surrounding the crime scene and comes to the conclusion that the chain was stolen by the Jersey Devil, and the two set off to search for the cryptid. While stocking up on adventuring supplies, they meet the Sibling Brothers, arrogant mystery-solvers who are annoyed that the Pines brothers are encroaching on their territory. Stan and Ford go to the carnival to look for more clues and come across several circus freaks, who rebuff them until Ford reveals his six fingers to them. One freak shows the boys one of his many tattoos — a map leading to the Jersey Devil's hideout.

The map leads the boys to the nearby lighthouse, but the lighthouse keeper refuses to let "a known delinquent like Stanley Pines" enter the lighthouse. Stan and Ford discover that the Sibling Brothers are following their trail; in a fit of impatience, Stan accidentally pushes the brothers off a sand dune. Believing them to be dead, the Pines twins decide to steal the Sibling Brothers' clothes and impersonate them. The lighthouse keeper is fooled by the ruse, and the Pines twins discover the pathway to the Jersey Devil's cave.

Stan and Ford are separated while exploring the cave. The Sibling Brothers reappear and present Ford with photographic proof that Stan stole the chain. Stan eventually returns, closely followed by the Jersey Devil. All four boys flee, but when Stan and Ford make it to safety, Ford demands to know why Stan stole the chain and lied about it. Stan tearfully confesses that he only took the chain because he wanted to customize it for Father's Day in the hopes of earning Filbrick's approval, and he panicked when he accidentally broke the glass case the chain was kept in.

Before Ford can reply, the Jersey Devil shows up again, but is captured by the Sibling Brothers, who give Ford the chance of taking credit for finding the monster if he gives them the pictures of Stan stealing the chain back so they can collect the reward — otherwise, the Sibling Brothers will frame both Pines twins for the theft. Ford allows Shanklin (Stan's pet possum with a knife strapped to its back) to attack the brothers and free the Jersey Devil. Overcome with anger, the Sibling Brothers call the Pines twins "freaks", but the circus freaks overhear them, become offended, and begin chasing them as Stan and Ford head home. Although Stan returns the chain and Filbrick discovers why Stan stole it, Filbrick still grounds both Stan and Ford for the entire summer, but the twins find solace in each other's company.

The story ends with a flashforward to present-day Stan and Ford preparing to set sail on the Stan-O-War II, and a short ballad detailing some of their adventures on the seas.

=== Epilogue ===
Shmebulock breaks the fourth wall by ranting about the potential for the stories he told to be adapted into either a film or miniseries, and also disclosing that he presumably has more adventures for another "season". Shmebulock tells the reader of the existence of a secret message hidden in the book, but before he can disclose anything else, dawn breaks and his curse goes back into effect.

== Publication history ==
Gravity Falls is an animated television series created by Alex Hirsch. It aired over two seasons, with the finale having aired on February 15, 2016. In subsequent interviews about the show, Hirsch mentioned he considered creating comics for the series, using various ideas that were not used for the show as they were considered too short, "weird" or "specific".

The graphic novel was first announced as Untitled Gravity Falls the Graphic Novel at the D23 Expo in 2017, during a shared panel with Star vs. the Forces of Evil. Through an online jigsaw puzzle via Twitter called Puzzling Pines, the cover art for the book was released on February 15, 2018; which also was the 2-year anniversary of the show's conclusion. The book was released on July 24, 2018, as part of a dual merchandise release with the Shout! Factory-produced complete series box set, with an estimated sales of 702 copies in the subsequent month.

Lost Legends also contains series of codes that lead to a companion website called "shmeb-you-unlocked". On it, there is additional tie-in content and comics as well as additional codes which are deciphered using a key found within the box set for the series. A German translation of Lost Legends was published in February 2025.

== Critical response ==
Gravity Falls: Lost Legends has been generally well received by fans. In August 2018, the book appeared on The New York Times Best Seller list. It has been praised for its "brilliant application" of the comic medium, especially with one story Comix Up making reference to various art styles of other renowned comics. The four stories have been welcomed as "faithful additions" to the Gravity Falls series and considered "a love letter to the fans from Alex Hirsch himself". Capturing the "charm" of the TV series, the graphic novel includes cryptograms scattered throughout the stories and exploration of morals just like the episodes in the show, with each character "learning something important about themselves" at the end of each story.
