= Weirdmageddon 3: Take Back the Falls =

- Gravity Falls episode
- Episode no.: Season 2 Episode 20
- Directed by: Stephen Sandoval
- Written by: Shion Takeuchi; Mark Rizzo; Jeff Rowe; Josh Weinstein; Alex Hirsch
- Editing by: Kevin Locarro
- Production codes: 618G-220; 618G-221
- Original air date: February 15, 2016
- Running time: 44 minutes

Guest appearances
- Cecil Baldwin as Tad Strange; Kurt Braunohler as Greg Valentino; Jackie Buscarino as Pacifica Northwest; Louis C.K. as The Horrifying Sweaty One-Armed Monstrosity (Note: Because of his sexual misconduct admission in 2017, C.K. has since been redubbed by series creator Alex Hirsch.); Nathan Fillion as Preston Northwest; Danielle Fishel as Pyronica; Larry King as the head of a cursed Larry King wax sculpture; Kyle MacLachlan as a bus driver; Andy Merrill as Teeth; Alfred Molina as The Multi-Bear; J. K. Simmons as Ford Pines; T.J. Miller as Robbie; Kevin Michael Richardson as Sheriff Blubs; John DiMaggio as Manly Dan; Jennifer Coolidge as Lazy Susan; Carl Faruolo as Grenda Grendinator; Keith Ferguson as Deputy Durland; Will Forte as Mayor Tyler Cutebiker; Stephen Root as Bud Gleeful; Kimberly Mooney as Janice Valentino; Gregg Turkington as Toby Determined; Thurop Van Orman as Gideon Gleeful; Kari Wahlgren as Shandra Jimenez; Niki Yang as Candy Chiu

Episode chronology
← Previous "Weirdmageddon 2: Escape from Reality"	Next → —
- Gravity Falls season 2

"Weirdmageddon 3: Take Back the Falls" (Note: Split into two episodes, with the second being "Weirdmageddon 4: Somewhere in the Woods", in some later airings and on Disney+) is the series finale of the American animated television series Gravity Falls, which was created by Alex Hirsch. The episode, which serves as the twentieth episode of the second season and the 40th episode overall, was written by Shion Takeuchi, Mark Rizzo, Jeff Rowe, Josh Weinstein and Hirsch, while being directed by Stephen Sandoval. In this episode, Stan's brother Ford (voiced by J. K. Simmons) discovers the extent of Bill Cipher's plans, while the Mystery Shack crew forms a plan to fight back and reclaim the town. A final confrontation with Bill leads to the Pines family's ultimate fate and greatest sacrifice.

"Weirdmageddon 3: Take Back the Falls" was first broadcast on February 15, 2016, on Disney XD, and was watched by 2.47 million household viewers in the United States and garnered a 0.51 rating in the 18-49 demographics. It became the most watched telecast in the history of Disney XD, beating "A Tale of Two Stans", another episode of Gravity Falls. It was followed by the 2018 graphic novel Gravity Falls: Lost Legends and the 2024 book The Book of Bill that told new stories and expanded on existing media.

== Plot ==
Dipper, Mabel, Soos and Wendy reunite with Grunkle Stan at the Mystery Shack. The Shack had become a refuge for Weirdmageddon survivors after Ford and Dipper’s spell protected it from Bill’s powers. Everyone but Stan elects to rescue Ford as only he knows Bill’s weakness; McGucket leads the survivors in transforming the Shack into a giant mech. Meanwhile, Bill tortures Ford into telling him the secret to collapsing Gravity Falls’ barrier.

The “Shacktron” arrives at Bill’s castle and defeats his lackeys. Bill confronts the mech himself but it blinds him long enough to deploy a search team for Ford. Mabel locates Ford atop a throne built of the petrified townspeople. After the twins disassemble the throne, Ford reveals Bill’s weakness by drawing on the floor a zodiac circle decorated with symbols each connected to a certain individual. The Pines family and select people from Gravity Falls join hands over the circle but are disrupted when Stan and Ford quarrel again. Bill returns after having defeated the Shacktron. He destroys the circle, imprisons the Pines family and turns the other zodiac members into banners on the ceiling.

Dipper and Mabel quickly escape in an effort to lead Bill away from the brothers. Bill quickly captures the twins and moves to kill one of them until Ford reluctantly allows Bill into his mind. Bill leaves his physical body, petrifying it, before entering Ford’s mindscape only to encounter Stan’s: the brothers had secretly swapped clothes to trick Bill into entering a mind that could be erased. As Ford uses the memory gun on Stan’s head, Bill begs for mercy before disintegrating, with his line in reverse being (ommited:YOU KEÆALLED ME!!!) A-X-O-L-O-T-L MY TIME HAS COME TO BURN, I INVOKE THE ANCIENT POWER THAT I MAY RETURN!! Bill’s friends and chaos magic are pulled back to their dimension, restoring Gravity Falls to normal. An amnesiac Stan returns to a ruined Mystery Shack where Dipper, Mabel and Soos slowly restore his memory by retelling their adventures in Mabel’s scrapbook.

One week later, the Mystery Shack is rebuilt in time for Dipper and Mabel’s birthday. During the party, Ford asks Stan to sail around the world with him as a final act of reconciliation. Stan gladly accepts and passes ownership of the Shack to Soos. Before the twins leave Gravity Falls, Wendy gives a letter to Dipper. Inside is a message signed by their friends and family wishing to see them next summer. In a post-credits scene, a real-life statue of Bill’s petrified body is briefly shown in a forest. (Note: This scene sets up the Cipher Hunt, an international scavenger hunt for the real-life Bill Cipher statue launched by Alex Hirsch.)

== Production ==
The first thing to know is that the show isn’t being cancelled - it’s being finished. This is 100% my choice, and its something I decided on a very long time ago. I always designed Gravity Falls to be a finite series about one epic summer - a series with a beginning, middle, and end. There are so many shows that go on endlessly until they lose their original spark, or mysteries that are cancelled before they ever get a chance to payoff.

— Hirsch regarding the ending of Gravity Falls

"Weirdmageddon 3: Take Back the Falls" is the twentieth episode of the second season, and the series finale, of Gravity Falls, which was created by Alex Hirsch. He wrote the episode along with Mark Rizzo, Jeff Rowe, Shion Takeuchi, and Josh Weinstein. It is the fifth episode of the show to be directed by Stephen Sandoval.

On November 20, 2015, before the final two "Weirdmageddon" episodes aired on Disney XD, Hirsch announced on his Tumblr account that he decided to end Gravity Falls. He explained that Disney wasn't cancelling the show, but instead being finished by his own choice, and that it was a decision made months in advance. Hirsch went on to explain that he did not want the series to lose its original spark, and he never meant the show to "go on forever", but an exploration of the experience of summer and a story about childhood itself. According to Hirsch, the fact that childhood ends is exactly what makes the show so precious – and why the viewers should cherish it while it lasts.

The episode features a number of guest stars who had already appeared on the show once or twice, such as Cecil Baldwin as Tad Strange, Kurt Braunohler as Greg Valentino, Louis CK as The Horrifying Sweaty One-Armed Monstrosity (a role that has since been redubbed by Hirsch), Nathan Fillion as Preston Northwest, Danielle Fishel as Pyronica, Larry King as a wax version of his disembodied head, Andy Merrill as Teeth, Alfred Molina as the Multi-Bear, and J.K. Simmons taking the main role as Ford Pines. There is only one new character in the finale: the bus driver who takes Dipper and Mabel back to Piedmont, California, voiced by Twin Peaks star Kyle MacLachlan.

== Broadcast ==
The episode premiered on Disney XD on February 15, 2016, at 7:00pm EST. On its premiere day, the episode garnered an average of 2.47 million viewers across the United States and a 0.51 rating in the 18-49 demographics, beating "A Tale of Two Stans" as the most watched telecast in the history of the network.

On February 8, 2016, one week before the premiere, Disney XD aired a special titled Gravity Falls: Between the Pines, hosted by series creator Alex Hirsch and Gravity Falls character Time Baby (played by Dave Wittenberg). The special elaborates on the production of the show, giving fans an inside look behind the scenes. A 68-hour marathon aired on Disney XD from February 12, 2016, up until the finale on February 15, 2016, with the entire series airing in order. Because there were only 39 episodes, the show was looped four times to fill the 68-hour slot.

== Reception ==
The episode received acclaim from both critics and fans of the show. Alasdair Wilkins of The A.V. Club opined that it was the perfect ending to the series and awarded the episode an "A" for bringing back as many characters as possible, with even tertiary supporting characters getting their own little moment to shine. He applauded the way the episode "exemplifies all Gravity Falls [could] be at its frequent best: it's funny, emotional, beautiful and terrifying in equal measure." According to him, "[B]ack when Gravity Falls started out, it was pitched as a kid-friendly cross of The Simpsons, Twin Peaks, and The X-Files. I can think of no finer final tribute than to say it lived up to all the ridiculous potential implicit in that description … and ended up being something even better than that." In the end, he wrote that Gravity Falls had kicked off his A.V. Club reviewing career nearly four years earlier and was likely to be the only show he would ever get to review wire-to-wire, and so would always have a very special place in his heart for reasons that he couldn't imagine anyone else caring all that much about.

Max Nicholson of IGN gave the episode a 9 out of 10, praising its way of "balancing all the characters" and "not leaving anybody out of the fun". He also enjoyed the minor references to previous episodes. According to him, "Weirdmageddon 3" was filled with laughs, excitement and heartwarming moments. In his review, "As animated series go, Gravity Falls was an excellent one, and it'll be sad to see it go. At the same time, I'm glad it ended while it was still fresh, so fans can remember it fondly".

The episode gained considerable press attention after the revelation that the characters Sheriff Blubs and Deputy Durland are gay, with coverage on LGBT-oriented sites as well. The pairing was revealed after Mayor Tyler Cutebiker passes the "Never Mind All That!" Act, which requires he townspeople to say "Never Mind All That!" to anyone who asks about the events of Weirdmaggedon, to which Sheriff Blubs adds that if anyone violates the Act and says the truth about what happened, then they'll be zapped by tasers. Deputy Durland then declares that they're "mad with power", then turns to Blubs as they add "...and love" together in unison. Hirsch previously said he believed that he would be blocked from including LGBT characters in the series. He said: "I would love to, but I doubt they'd ever let me do it in kids' TV. But man, I would if I could". This was the first time Disney XD and Disney Channel introduced a gay male couple, a move described as "Disney taking a huge step towards equality".
