= The Book of Bill =

2024 novel by Alex Hirsch

- Date: July 23, 2024
- Publisher: Hyperion Avenue Books

Creative team
- Writer: Alex Hirsch
- Artists: Aron Bothman; Emmy Cicierega; Lip Comarella; Jonny Crickets; Stephen DeStefano; Goran Gligović; Andy Gonsalves; Christoph Gromer; Trevor Henderson; Danny Hynes; Alex Konstad; Joe Pitt; Dor Shamir; Gabriel Soares; Jeffrey Thompson; Eduardo Valdés-Hevia; Ian Worrel; Louie Zong

Original publication
- Language: English
- ISBN: 9781368092203 (B&N); 9781368104807 (Collector's); 9781368117845

Chronology
- Preceded by: Gravity Falls: Lost Legends (July 24, 2018)

The Book of Bill is a teen and adult-audience science fiction book published by Hyperion Avenue Books, based on the children's animated television series Gravity Falls. Written by series creator Alex Hirsch, the book retells its story from the perspective of primary antagonist Bill Cipher (who is credited as a co-writer and artist), extending before and after the events shown in the series.

First announced in December 2023, the book was released on July 23, 2024. An exclusive edition with 16 extra pages of behind the scenes production art and drawings is available from Barnes & Noble. The Book of Bill was generally positively received by fans and the media. The book appeared on The New York Times Best Seller list in July 2024, and remained through January 2025.

== Plot summary ==
The book doesn't follow a standard plot, moreso being a book of Bill revealing fictional facts about the multiverse across a myriad of different formatting, such as a Q&A, pages from a Journal (similar to the other official Gravity Falls book Journal 3) and a Trolley Problem situation. It opens with Bill making a deal with the reader where he says that he will reveal secrets of the universe in exchange for an undisclosed favour. Some topics he discuss include love, his weaknesses, dreams and death. At several points in the book, Stanford Pines, a character from the show, urges the character to stop reading, saying that he found the book by his home and it is indestructible. Nearing the end of the book, Bill reveals parts of his origin, although it is incredibly redacted it is revealed that Bill was originally an outcast ostracized for his ability to see the Fourth Dimension and accidentally destroyed his home dimension along with all of inhabitants. At the very end it is revealed that Bill created the book during a type of rehabilitation therapy exercise, where he is seemingly stuck in a prison dimension indefinitely.

== Publication history ==
In interviews regarding Gravity Falls after its finale, Alex Hirsch mentioned that he considered writing books based on the series, using various ideas that were not used for the show because they were considered too short, "weird", or "specific".

The Book of Bill was first announced in December 2023, as the first Gravity Falls book not to contain "Gravity Falls" in the title, and is intended for an older audience. The book was released on July 23, 2024, with Barnes & Noble releasing a special exclusive edition as well, which includes 16 extra pages of content.

=== Limited Collector's Edition ===
A limited collector's edition was announced on June 18, 2025, containing a glow-in-the-dark slipcase and special extras. This edition was released on September 23, 2025.

== Critical response ==
The Book of Bill has been generally well-received. Oliver Curry of Comic Book Resources wrote that the Book of Bill managed to explain some of the most important mysteries left in the series in an engaging manner and added that the book "is also full of more jokes and details about fan-favorite characters". Kate Bove of Screen Rant wrote that the book revealed new lore about Bill Cipher and the town of Gravity Falls. Bove also said the book offered "a humorous and fourth wall-breaking installment that allows Bill Cipher to tell his version of the story." In July 2024, The book appeared on The New York Times Best Seller list, and was still there twenty-four weeks later as of January 2025.

== ThisIsNotAWebsiteDotCom.com ==
Along with the book, an official companion website was launched alongside the book. ThisIsNotAWebsiteDotCom.com is an Alternate Reality Game (ARG) where users would enter codes to uncover hidden pieces of lore, jokes, etc. Users can also "sell their soul" to Bill Cipher by entering the code, "Naitsuaf" into the computer, Naitsuaf being the backwards spelling of Faustian (see also, Faustian Bargain). Selling their soul to Cipher makes the flame of the candle next to the computer appear blue. Turning the knob next to the red button on the computer (the enter button) makes a backwards message play. Reversing that message plays, "HELP. THE MURDERER'S NAME IS BILL!" and "YOU KILLED US ALL."
