= Gravity Falls =

American animated television series

- Genre: Adventure; Mystery; Surreal comedy
- Created by: Alex Hirsch
- Showrunner: Alex Hirsch
- Creative director: Mike Rianda (season 1)
- Voices of: Jason Ritter; Kristen Schaal; Alex Hirsch; Linda Cardellini; J. K. Simmons
- Theme music composer: Brad Breeck
- Opening theme: "Gravity Falls Theme"
- Composer: Brad Breeck
- Country of origin: United States
- Original language: English
- No. of seasons: 2
- No. of episodes: 40 (list of episodes)

Production
- Executive producer: Alex Hirsch
- Producers: Tobias Conan Trost (season 1); Brian Doell (season 2); Suzanna Olson (season 2)
- Editor: Kevin Locarro
- Running time: 20–24 minutes (Note: The season two episodes "A Tale of Two Stans" and "Weirdmageddon 3: Take Back the Falls" run for 29 and 44 minutes, respectively.)
- Production company: Disney Television Animation

Original release
- Network: Disney Channel (season 1); Disney XD (season 2)
- Release: June 15, 2012 – February 15, 2016

Related
- Journal 3; Lost Legends; The Book of Bill

Gravity Falls is an American animated mystery comedy television series created by Alex Hirsch for Disney Channel and Disney XD. The series follows the adventures of Dipper Pines (Jason Ritter) and his twin sister Mabel (Kristen Schaal), who are sent to spend the summer with their great-uncle (or "Grunkle") Stan (Hirsch) in Gravity Falls, Oregon, a mysterious town rife with paranormal incidents and supernatural creatures. The kids help Stan run the "Mystery Shack", the tourist trap that he owns, while also investigating the local mysteries.

The series premiered on June 15, 2012, and ran for two seasons until February 15, 2016. On November 20, 2015, Hirsch announced that the series would conclude with its second season, stating that this was "100% [his] choice" and that "the show isn't being cancelled – it's being finished" and was reaching its intended conclusion. He later stated that he remains open to producing additional episodes or specials. Various literary works partially set after the events of the series have since been released, including the 2016 replica of Journal 3, the 2018 graphic novel Gravity Falls: Lost Legends, and the 2024 teen-oriented novel The Book of Bill.

Gravity Falls has received critical acclaim for its writing, characters, voice acting, animation, and humor. Additionally, the series won two Emmy Awards, three Annie Awards, and a BAFTA Children's Award, among various other wins and nominations. Gravity Falls garnered high viewership amongst children, teenagers, and young adults during its run and was Disney XD's highest-rated show in 2015 and early 2016, while also setting several ratings records for the network. The series has attracted a broad and passionate fandom, is considered to be an influence for many animated shows that followed it, and spawned a variety of official merchandise.

== Premise ==
For their summer vacation, 12-year-old twin siblings Dipper and Mabel Pines are dropped off from their home in Piedmont, California to the fictitious town of Gravity Falls, Oregon, to spend the summer with their great uncle ("Grunkle") Stan Pines, who runs a tourist trap called the "Mystery Shack". Soon after they arrive in Gravity Falls, Dipper accidentally uncovers a mysterious journal that details many different paranormal or mythical creatures that live in the town. With Wendy Corduroy, Mystery Shack cashier; Soos Ramirez, a friend of Dipper and Mabel and handyman to Grunkle Stan; plus an assortment of other characters, Dipper and Mabel always have an intriguing day to look forward to.

== Episodes ==
Main series

Season	Episodes	Originally released		
Season	Episodes	First released	Last released	Network
Pilot		—N/a		—N/a
1	20	June 15, 2012 (Note: The first episode of the season premiered as a series preview. The series made its official premiere on Disney Channel on June 29, 2012.)	August 2, 2013	Disney Channel
2	20 (Note: The final episode, "Weirdmageddon 3: Take Back the Falls", has sometimes been split up into two separate episodes, with the first half maintaining the original title, while the second half is titled "Weirdmageddon 4: Somewhere in the Woods". The splitting is also observed on Disney+, bringing the total episode count of the season on the streaming service to 21.)	August 1, 2014 (Note: The first episode of the season premiered on Disney Channel. The second season officially began on August 4, 2014 on Disney XD, the new network for the series.)	February 15, 2016	Disney XD

TV shorts

Series	Title	Episodes	Originally released	
Series	Title	Episodes	First released	Last released
1	Dipper's Guide to the Unexplained	6	October 14, 2013	October 18, 2013
2	Mabel's Guide to Life	5	February 3, 2014	February 7, 2014
3	Fixin' It with Soos	2	April 21, 2014	April 22, 2014
4	TV Shorts	2	April 23, 2014	April 24, 2014
5	Mabel's Scrapbook	2	June 2, 2014	

Other shorts

Series	Title	Episodes	Originally released	
Series	Title	Episodes	First released	Last released
1	Creature in the Closet	1	April 17, 2012	
7	Creepy Letters from Lil' Gideon	5	November 7, 2014	December 2, 2014
8	Old Man McGucket's Conspiracy Corner	10	April 19, 2015	
9	Grunkle Stan's Lost Mystery Shack Interviews	13	June 28, 2015	July 12, 2015
10	'Pocalypse Preppin'	8	October 21, 2015	November 16, 2015
11	Mystery Shack: Shop at Home with Mr. Mystery	9	November 16, 2015	November 22, 2015
12	Soos' Stan Fiction	4	February 17, 2017	
13	Gravity Falls x Line Rider	1	September 11, 2020	
14	Call Me Maybe Parody	1	September 25, 2020	
15	How NOT To Draw: Grunkle Stan	1	August 17, 2024	

Other specials

Series	Title	Episodes	Originally released
1	Between the Pines (Note: A "Post-Finale Edition" of this episode aired on March 26, 2016. It featured clips from the series finale added in.)	1	February 8, 2016
2	One Crazy Summer: A Look Back at Gravity Falls	1	July 28, 2018
3	The Hirsch Twins	1	July 28, 2018

== Voice cast ==
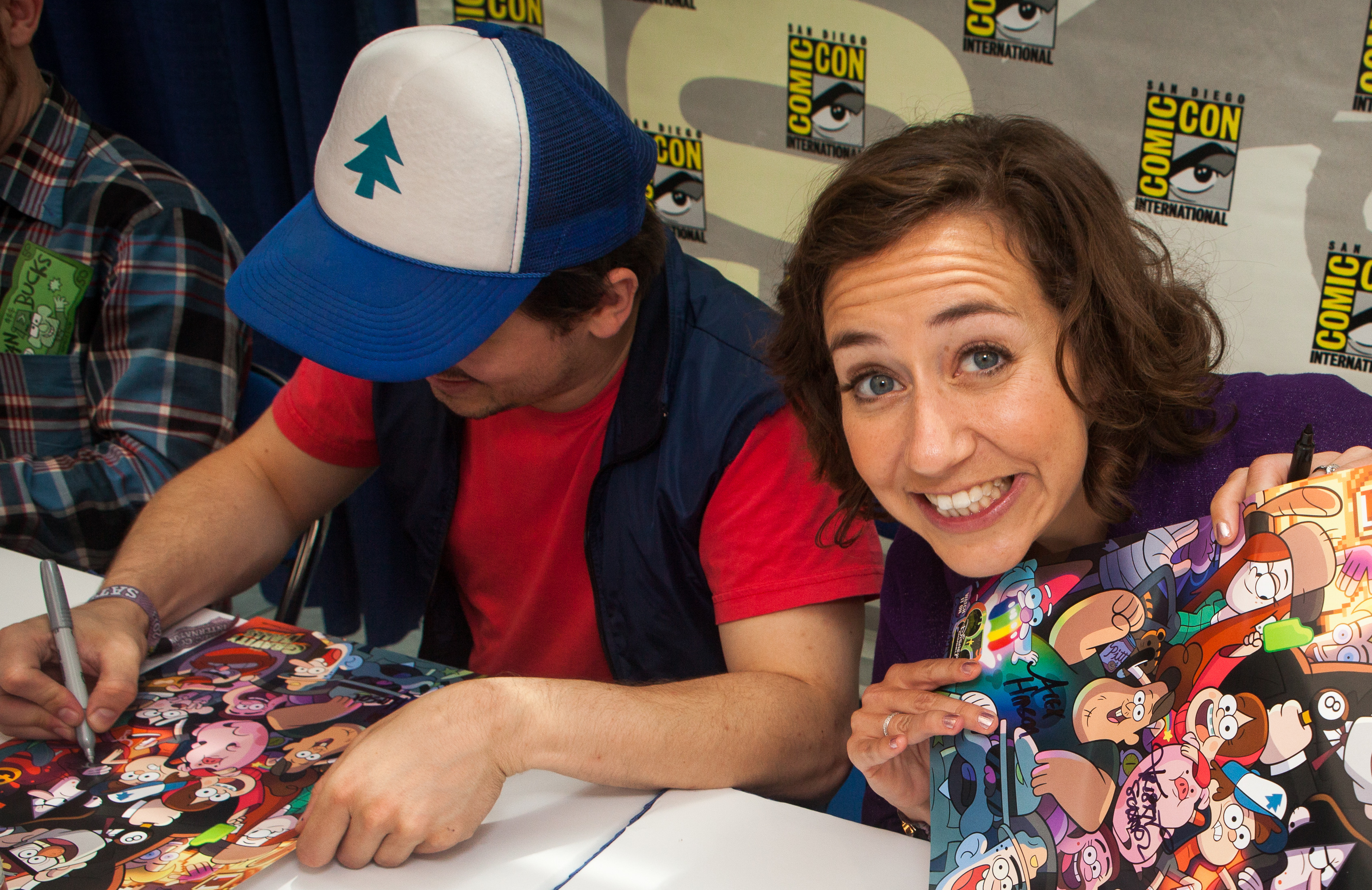
Jason Ritter and Kristen Schaal at San Diego Comic-Con in 2013

- Jason Ritter as Dipper Pines, the 12-year-old twin brother of Mabel Pines and the straight man to his sister's antics.
- Kristen Schaal as Mabel Pines, the 12-year-old hyperactive and fun-loving twin sister of Dipper Pines.
- Alex Hirsch as:
  - Stanley Pines (also known as "Grunkle Stan"), the greedy, grumpy, yet loving great-uncle of Dipper and Mabel Pines and owner and manager of the Mystery Shack.
  - Jesus "Soos" Ramirez, the 22-year-old handyman at the Mystery Shack.
  - Bill Cipher, an interdimensional demon that can be summoned and released into a person's mind. He resembles a one-eyed yellow triangle superficially similar to the Eye of Providence and wears a top hat and a bow tie. He serves as the main antagonist of the series.
- Linda Cardellini as Wendy Corduroy, a tomboyish 15-year-old part-time cashier at the Mystery Shack and Dipper's unrequited crush.
- J. K. Simmons (season 2) as Stanford Pines, Stanley's six-fingered long-lost older identical twin brother and the author of the journals.

== Production ==
=== Conception ===
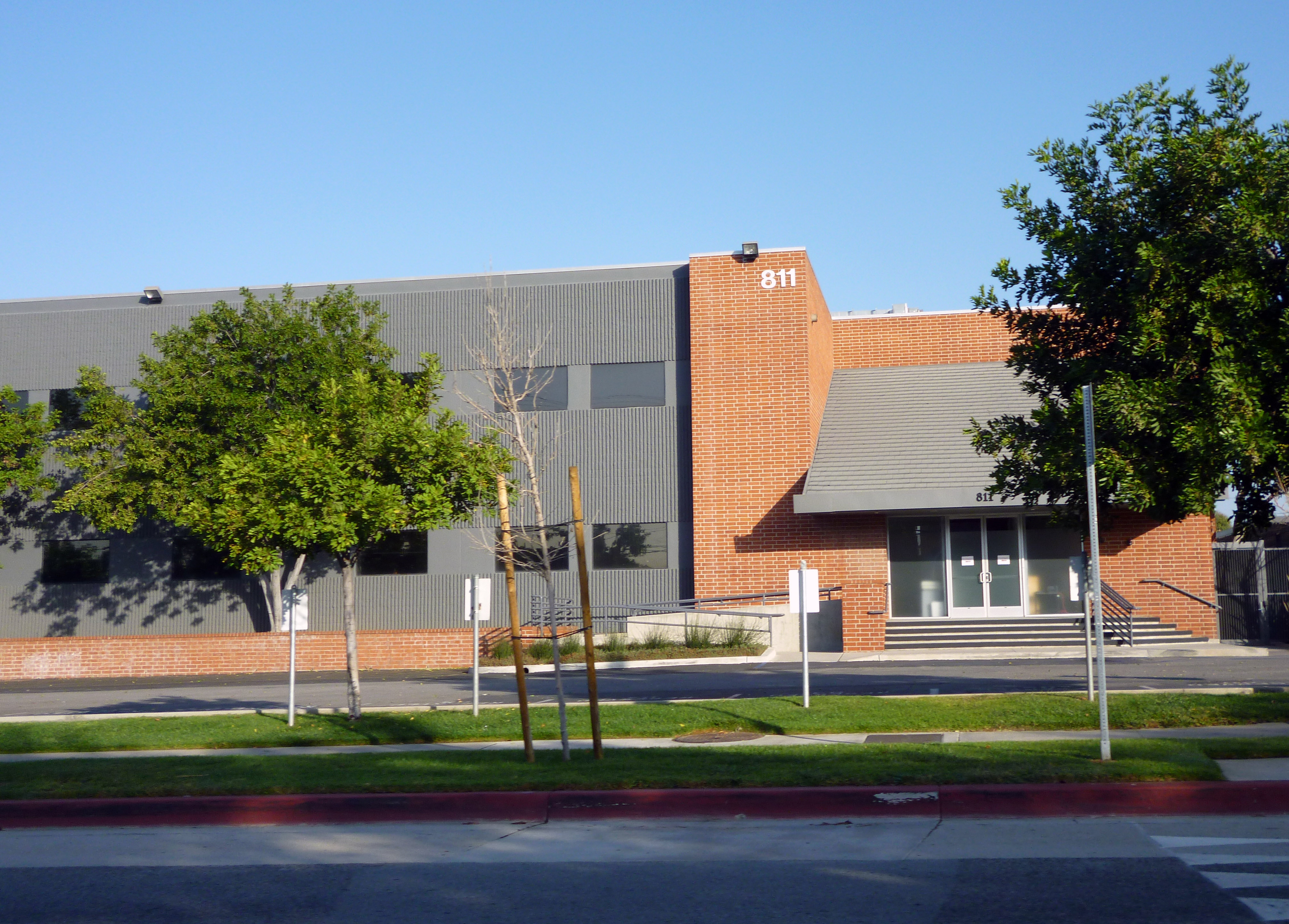
Gravity Falls' main production offices were located at Disney Television Animation in Glendale, California.

Before working on the series, series creator Alex Hirsch's primary inspiration growing up was shows such as Twin Peaks and The X-Files, and animated sitcoms like The Simpsons, where he observed that "animation could be funnier than live-action. That animation didn't have to just be for kids. That it could be satirical and observational and grounded in a sense of character interaction". Hirsch graduated from the California Institute of the Arts, and was hired to work as writer and storyboard artist for the Cartoon Network series The Marvelous Misadventures of Flapjack, where he was paired up with Pendleton Ward, the creator of Adventure Time. Afterwards, he moved on to co-develop the Disney Channel animated series Fish Hooks, shortly before he pitched Gravity Falls, which was subsequently greenlit.

Hirsch said he was at the California Institute of the Arts when he turned down DreamWorks Animation executive Jeffrey Katzenberg out of a desire to work for Disney. He first developed the concept for the show in an 11-minute low-budget student film that he made at the institute. Hirsch was called in to do a pitch for Disney Channel for a show based on the short pilot. Disney Channel bought the idea and the series premiered on June 15, 2012.

The series was inspired by Hirsch's own childhood experiences and his relationship with his own twin sister growing up during their summer vacations, such as roadside attractions including the Mystery Spot and Oregon Vortex, and a road sign for a town named Boring. He inserted many of his real-life experiences into the show, such as living in Piedmont, California, and trick-or-treating with his sister as kids. Dipper is based on Hirsch's memory of how it felt to be a kid. When Hirsch was around Dipper's age, he "would record [him]self and play it backwards and try to learn to speak backwards". Hirsch described himself as "that neurotic kid who would carry 16 disposable cameras everywhere I went". Mabel Pines was inspired by his twin sister, Ariel Hirsch. According to Alex Hirsch, just like Mabel, his sister "really did wear wacky sweaters and have a different ridiculous crush, every week." In the series, Mabel gets a pet pig, just like his sister had always wanted when she was a kid. Grunkle Stan was inspired by Hirsch's grandfather Stan, who according to Hirsch "was a guy that told tall tales and would frequently mess with us to get a rise out of us. So, my family really inspired the characters on the show."

=== Writing ===
In an interview with Oh My Disney, Hirsch claimed he already had the beginning, middle, and end of the story for Gravity Falls planned out when he first pitched the series. He originally thought the series would "be two or three seasons". However, Hirsch had never created a TV series before and after experiencing how "incredibly draining" it was, he initially wanted to end the series after season one and, ultimately, on a cliffhanger.

After the series premiered and became a huge commercial success, Hirsch began to rethink his decision. Two people convinced Hirsch to return for a second season: Jon Stewart, who shared that his kids loved the show, and Over the Garden Wall creator Patrick McHale. McHale had been watching the series and told him: "Look, after that cliffhanger, you've got to finish it." Hirsch decided that he had about ten more episodes left in him, so he went to the network, who said, "We only take seasons in twenties". So he said, "Okay, one more season, … Before we started the [second] season, it said in my contract, before I put pen to paper, that this is my last season." The studio agreed, under the condition that Hirsch could not tell anyone. As a result, Jason Ritter, who voices Dipper, did not know the series was ending until after he read the finale script, claiming that "when I read the finale I thought, this feels like, not just the season finale. It feels like a series finale."

Hirsch explained in an interview with The A.V. Club that during the production of season one, a typical episode was conceived in a room reserved for writers, where a simple synopsis was presented, and from then on dramatic structure was defined, and the plot was modified to include a character-driven subplot, which Hirsch expressed as "the hardest thing ... to find a character story that actually uncovers, explores, or pushes tension—on something our characters care about—that is properly explored via the magic or monster or impossibility of the week."

A- and B-stories were created and given to a writer to produce an outline, which was then subsequently checked-off by Hirsch for feedback. The writer produced a draft from these edits, where more notes may have been given. Hirsch stated that he and creative director Mike Rianda may have personally created a draft for themselves before a final script was produced, in which the dialogue from the draft received from the writer was significantly revised; Hirsch stated that the revising process "is not a discredit to our writers—it's just we have a very particular vision. In particular, I usually rewrite almost all of Dipper's dialogue and most of Mabel's dialogue, just because I have them in my head. Me and Mike will stay up for about 24 hours prior to the delivery of every script. We'll take the weekend, we'll work all night, we'll drink Red Bull, we'll sleep on the couch in shifts like maniacs, we'll slap each other in the face."

=== Animation ===
After a script was delivered, an episode then got translated into a storyboard, where feedback was received from Hirsch to the board artists if a certain element, such as a gag, did not work. Afterwards, a pitch for the episode was given to the network, where they did a read-through, and then the episode was either checked out by the network, or retooled in the small amount of time allocated before an animation studio must receive something to work with. The series was animated by Rough Draft Korea, Digital eMation and Yearim Productions. Whenever a sequence was deemed too important for the outside animation studios to realize, it was animated in-house by storyboard artist and supervisor Dana Terrace.

== Broadcast ==
=== Initial broadcast ===
The first twelve episodes of Gravity Falls aired in a regular weekly slot on Disney Channel starting in mid-2012, but subsequent episodes were broadcast without similar regularity; it took until August 2013 to broadcast the remaining eight episodes of the first season. The second season began airing a year later in August 2014, transitioning over to Disney XD, but again without any regularity as to when new episodes would be first broadcast. The first nine episodes aired from August to November 2014, the following two in February and March 2015, the next eight from July to November 2015, and the finale aired on February 15, 2016. According to Disney XD, as each episode took about six months of work to complete, they opted against stockpiling episodes to show weekly but instead take advantage of the serial nature of the show, broadcasting each episode as it was completed and making an event out of it. On November 20, 2015, Hirsch announced that the series would conclude with its second season, stating that this was "100% [his] choice" and that "the show isn't being cancelled – it's being finished" and was reaching its intended conclusion. Hirsch has stated that he remains open to continuing the series with additional episodes or specials. On April 2, 2018, reruns of the show started airing on Disney Channel, although reruns of the show still air on Disney XD.

=== International broadcast ===
The series began airing on Disney Channel Canada on September 1, 2015, following Corus Entertainment's acquisition of Disney Channel rights in Canada. In Canada, the show began airing on Disney XD starting on December 1, 2015, following the launch of Disney XD. The show started broadcasting in the United Kingdom and Ireland on July 20, 2012 as a preview and officially premiered on September 7, 2012. In Australia and New Zealand, it previewed on August 17, 2012, and premiered on September 24, 2012. It also premiered in Southeast Asia on October 27, 2012. In India, it premiered on September 16, 2013.

The series preview debuted in Canada on June 15, 2012, and premiered on July 6, 2012, on Family Channel, until January 2016 when it moved to the local Disney XD channel following Corus Entertainment's acquisition of Disney Channel rights in Canada from Family's owner DHX Media. In Australia, the show airs on Disney XD and 7mate while in Chile, the show was broadcast on Canal 13 on November 24, 2013, under its programming block CuBox. In the Philippines, the show was shown on TV5 beginning on May 4, 2014, while in Brazil, the show also began airing on Rede Globo on May 10, 2014. In Indonesia, the show premiered on RCTI on August 17, 2014.

=== Broadcast edits ===
The symbol on Grunkle Stan's fez was changed from a crescent shape resembling the Islamic crescent to a fish-like symbol mid-way through the first season's broadcast. The symbol represents his membership in the Royal Order of the Holy Mackerel. When the series was released to Disney+, the crescent-shaped symbol was edited out entirely, leaving a symbol-less fez in the early episodes—later episodes featuring the fish-like symbol were unaffected. However, the crescent symbol remains in the thumbnails, and on the zodiac wheel in the title sequence. Hirsch drew attention to the change on Twitter. Disney has not commented on why it was removed. Sometime later, the symbol on the fez was restored.

In 2017, Disney Channel redubbed Louis C.K.'s minor role as "The Horrifying Sweaty One-Armed Monstrosity" in the 2015 episode "Weirdmageddon Part 1", as well as its 2016 follow-up episode and series finale, "Weirdmageddon 3: Take Back the Falls", following the comedian's admission of sexual misconduct. Series creator Alex Hirsch is now credited as voicing the character.

== Merchandise ==
=== Home media ===
DVDs
Title	Release date	Discs	Episodes	Ref.
Gravity Falls: Six Strange Tales	October 15, 2013	1	1–6	
Gravity Falls: Even Stranger	August 26, 2014	1	7–14	
Gravity Falls: The Complete Series	July 24, 2018	7	All	

On March 27, 2018, Shout! Factory announced that it would release the complete series as a box set on July 24, 2018, on DVD and Blu-ray Disc. The box set is available in a "Collector's Edition", which includes an exclusive bonus features disc. The complete series has only been released in the United States and Canada. The box set is now out of print.

=== Books ===
Title	Author(s)	Publisher	Release date	ISBN	Notes	Ref.
Gravity Falls: Happy Summerween!/The Convenience Store . . . of Horrors!	Samantha Brooke	Disney Press	July 22, 2014	ISBN 978-1484710784		
Gravity Falls: Pining Away	Disney Book Group	Disney Press	July 22, 2014	ISBN 978-1484711392		
Gravity Falls: Once Upon a Swine	Disney Book Group	Disney Press	October 7, 2014	ISBN 978-1484711408		
Gravity Falls: Dipper and Mabel's Guide to Mystery and Nonstop Fun!	Rob Renzetti & Shane Houghton	Disney Press	October 7, 2014	ISBN 978-1484710807		
Gravity Falls Cinestory Comic Vol. 1	Disney	Joe Books Inc.	December 8, 2015	ISBN 978-1926516998		
Gravity Falls: Journal 3	Alex Hirsch & Rob Renzetti	Disney Press	July 26, 2016	ISBN 978-1484746691	No. 1 New York Times Best Seller A special edition featuring black light ink on pages, a leather-textured cover with metallic pieces, a magnifying glass, removable photos/notes and an autograph from Alex Hirsch was released on June 13, 2017. It was limited to 10,000 copies.	
Gravity Falls: Dipper and Mabel and the Curse of the Time Pirates' Treasure!: A "Select Your Own Choose-Venture!"	Jeffrey Rowe	Disney Press	July 26, 2016	ISBN 978-1484746684		
Gravity Falls Cinestory Comic Vol. 2	Disney	Joe Books Inc.	September 20, 2016	ISBN 978-1988032917		
Gravity Falls Cinestory Comic Vol. 3	Disney	Joe Books Inc.	December 13, 2016	ISBN 978-1988032924		
Gravity Falls Don't Color This Book!: It's Cursed!	Emmy Cicierega	Disney Press	July 18, 2017	ISBN 978-1368008990		
Gravity Falls Shorts: Just West of Weird	Disney	Joe Books LTD	September 26, 2017	ISBN 978-1772755190		
Gravity Falls Weirdmageddon Cinestory Comic	Disney	Joe Books LTD	January 1, 2018	ISBN 978-1773911274		
Gravity Falls Mad Libs	Laura Macchiarola	Mad Libs	February 20, 2018	ISBN 978-1524787134		
Gravity Falls Cinestory Comic Vol. 4	Disney	Joe Books Inc.	April 10, 2018	ISBN 978-1772756722		
Gravity Falls: Lost Legends	Alex Hirsch	Disney Press	July 24, 2018	ISBN 978-1368021425	New York Times Best Seller A Barnes & Noble exclusive edition featuring 16 extra pages has been released.	
Gravity Falls: Cuties Are Everywhere Mabel's Sketchbook	Disney	Eksmo	May 29, 2019	ISBN 978-5-04-100624-2	Only released in Russian	
Gravity Falls Shorts: A Summer of Mysteries	Disney	Planeta Junior	June 11, 2019	ISBN 978-6070751387	Only released in Spanish	
Gravity Falls: My Secret Note Journal	Disney	Editorial Planeta	July 1, 2019	ISBN 978-6070760587	Only released in Spanish	
Gravity Falls Cinestory Comic Vol. 5	Disney	Planeta Junior	July 9, 2019	ISBN 978-6070756207	Only released in Spanish	
Gravity Falls: Book of Art and Mysteries	Disney	Editorial Planeta	September 1, 2019	ISBN 978-6070761164	Only released in Spanish	
Gravity Falls: A Year with Dipper and Mabel	Disney	Editorial Planeta	October 1, 2020	ISBN 978-6070769009	Only released in Spanish	
Gravity Falls Cinestory Comic Vol. 6	Disney	Planeta Junior	January 1, 2021	ISBN 978-6070771255	Only released in Spanish	
Gravity Falls: Unknown Dimension Stories and Many Different Entertainments	Disney	Eksmo	January 15, 2021	ISBN 978-5-04-110396-5	Only released in Russian	
Gravity Falls: Tales of the Strange and Unexplained (Bedtime Stories Based on Your Favorite Episodes!)	Disney	Disney Press	February 23, 2021	ISBN 978-1368064118		
Gravity Falls: Dipper and Mabel Megabook of Art	Disney	Editorial Planeta	March 9, 2021	ISBN 978-6070773228	Only released in Spanish	
Gravity Falls: Full History Season 1	Disney	Eksmo	March 25, 2021	ISBN 978-5041160661	Only released in Russian	
Gravity Falls Cinestory Comic Vol. 7	Disney	Planeta Junior	April 15, 2021	ISBN 978-6070772399	Only released in Spanish	
Gravity Falls Think like Dipper and Mabel: Your Creative Notebook with Stickers	Disney	Eksmo	April 16, 2021	ISBN 978-5699900398	Only released in Russian	
Gravity Falls: You Won't Get Bored with Us!	Disney	Eksmo	April 16, 2021	ISBN 978-5699926862	Only released in Russian	
Gravity Falls: Gamebook 1	Disney	Eksmo	April 30, 2021	ISBN 978-5040979639	Only released in Russian	
Gravity Falls: You Are Cool! Diary For Inspiration	Disney	Eksmo	June 11, 2021	ISBN 978-5041065560	Only released in Russian	
Gravity Falls: Sticker Book	Disney	Planeta Junior	September 1, 2021	ISBN 978-6070779084	Only released in Spanish	
Gravity Falls: Activity Book 1	Disney	Eksmo	October 15, 2021	ISBN 978-5-04-155582-5	Only released in Russian	
Gravity Falls: Fan Encyclopedia	Disney	Eksmo	October 22, 2021	ISBN 978-5-04-117223-7	Only released in Russian	
Gravity Falls: Destroy This Journal with Dipper and Mabel	Disney	Eksmo	November 15, 2021	ISBN 978-5-04-113685-7	Only released in Russian	
Gravity Falls Dipper's Guide to the Inexplicable: Journal of Anomalies	Disney	Eksmo	November 19, 2021	ISBN 978-5-04-155585-6	Only released in Russian	
Gravity Falls: Activity Book 2	Disney	Eksmo	November 25, 2021	ISBN 978-5-04-155583-2	Only released in Russian	
Gravity Falls: Activity Book 3	Disney	Eksmo	December 10, 2021	ISBN 978-5-04-155584-9	Only released in Russian	
Gravity Falls: Gamebook 2	Disney	Eksmo	December 14, 2021	ISBN 978-5040994878	Only released in Russian	
Gravity Falls: Top Secret Fan Book	Disney	Eksmo	December 30, 2021	ISBN 978-5-04-107748-8	Only released in Russian	
Gravity Falls: Big Book of Word Games and Logic Puzzles	Disney	Eksmo	January 12, 2022	ISBN 978-5-04-106494-5	Only released in Russian	
Gravity Falls: Full History Season 2	Disney	Eksmo	February 2, 2022	ISBN 978-5-04-116067-8	Only released in Russian	
Gravity Falls: Fanbook with Tasks and Puzzles	Disney	Eksmo	May 26, 2022	ISBN 978-5-04-157996-8	Only released in Russian	
Learn to Draw Gravity Falls	Disney	Eksmo	June 23, 2022	ISBN 978-5-04-157995-1	Only released in Russian	
Gravity Falls: Nothing is What it Seems	Disney	Eksmo	July 14, 2022	ISBN 978-5-04-167084-9	Only released in Russian	
The Book of Bill	Alex Hirsch	Hyperion Avenue Books	July 23, 2024	ISBN 1368092209	Amazon and No. 1 New York Times Best-Seller. The first Gravity Falls book targeted at a mature audience. A Barnes & Noble exclusive edition featuring 16 extra pages and an autograph from Alex Hirsch was also released.	
The Art of Gravity Falls	Alex Hirsch & Rob Renzetti	Disney Press	September 15, 2026	ISBN 9781368119399	New York Times Best-Seller. A Barnes & Noble exclusive edition featuring a replica of the letter Dipper received at the end of Weirdmageddon 3: Take Back the Falls was also released.	

=== Video game ===
A video game was created for the series, titled Gravity Falls: Legend of the Gnome Gemulets. The game was released exclusively on Nintendo 3DS on October 20, 2015. It was developed and published by Ubisoft and produced by Disney Interactive Studios. The game is a platformer and uses the same graphics as the series.

== Reception ==
=== Critical reception ===
Gravity Falls received critical acclaim, with praise directed at its writing, characters, voice acting, animation, humor, and multi-generational appeal. Both seasons of Gravity Falls hold a 100% approval rating on Rotten Tomatoes. On Rotten Tomatoes, the first season has an average critic score of 7.40 out of 10 based on 12 reviews. The second and final season has an average critic score of 8.80 out of 10 based on 8 reviews. The website's critical consensus for season one reads: "Gravity Falls' warm humor and bright performances elevate this children's cartoon to a show for all ages", while the website's critical consensus for season two reads: "Gravity Falls continues to blend old fashioned storytelling with a modern sense of humor to create a uniquely enjoyable viewing experience."

Brian Lowry of Variety stated: "The show has a breezy quality that should play to kids, and tickle some twinges of nostalgia among their parents." Robert Lloyd of the Los Angeles Times referred to the program as "...gently twisted, with some Disneyfied action and heart-warming folded in". In his review, David Hinckley of New York Daily News called Gravity Falls "quirky and endearing", and offered praise for the character of Mabel Pines. Matt Blum, writing for Wired, favorably compared the show to Cartoon Network's Regular Show and Disney Channel's Phineas and Ferb, hailing Gravity Falls as "clever, strange, and somewhat poignant". Erik Kain of Forbes called Gravity Falls "the best thing on TV at the moment", saying "I don't care how old you are, if you're not watching Gravity Falls you're missing out on some of the cleverest, most enjoyable television you can find". Kayla Cobb of Decider called Gravity Falls "one of the most structurally smart shows ever created". Matt Fowler from IGN called Gravity Falls "a quirky and gently twisted heart-warmer for all ages. Smart, satirical, and sweet. Gravity Falls was a one-of-a-kind gem."

Michelle Jaworski writing for The Daily Dot described Gravity Falls as "[A] classic summer story woven into a smart and addictive show tackling the paranormal, the supernatural, and the pains of growing up." IndieWire's Michael Schneider said "Gravity Falls is a kids' show so dense with mythology, pop culture jokes, Easter eggs, and mystery that grown-ups were often more invested." Joey Keogh from Den of Geek wrote "Gravity Falls, is a spooky-cute must-watch for adults who never grew out of Halloween." Donna Dickens from Uproxx said "Not only does Gravity Falls deal with the inexplicable supernatural occurrences in the town, the whole thing is just one big puzzle of secrets waiting for fans to uncover and solve." Myles McNutt from The A.V. Club said "With a complex mythology and a deep lexicon of cultural references, there's sophistication to the show's epic storytelling that immediately drew the attention of a wider audience." Liz Baessler writing for Film School Rejects said "Gravity Falls is an exceptional kids' show — brilliant, hilarious, and carefully crafted." Kevin Tash from Collider called Gravity Falls "one of the greatest things that Disney has ever produced in general".

Brian Tallerico from RogerEbert.com said "Gravity Falls deserves to be in the conversation with Bob's Burgers, Rick and Morty, and BoJack Horseman when people discuss the best animated programming of the '10s. It is a beautiful blend of old-fashioned storytelling with a modern sense of humor that never feels like it's talking down to kids. It works for all ages. It sounds cheesy, but the best fiction for kids doesn't hammer them with a message but incorporates it into the characters and story. It's a deliriously strange, fascinating show, with sources of humor and heart that always find a way to surprise. It also helps that the voice work is uniformly fantastic." Collider's Joel Pesantez said "Gravity Falls exemplifies Disney's ability to appeal to all ages with captivating mysteries and a diverse, relatable cast. The show cleverly blends comedy and horror to keep viewers hooked, pushing boundaries without crossing them." Abigail Stevens of Screen Rant said "There is so much to learn about from Gravity Falls' two seasons, which pack in plenty of laugh-out-loud and tear-jerking moments." Stevens further added, "Gravity Falls also created something of a cult of mystery, encouraging viewers to find hidden codes in each episode and giving rise to a fandom that was able to predict the show's biggest twist. However, at its core, Gravity Falls is about family and letting go of childhood." Lilian McDonough from CBR called Gravity Falls "the undeniable peak of Disney Channel cartoon history" and said "by utilizing an overarching narrative to an extent that no prior Disney cartoon had and funneling that into an intricately crafted and endlessly interesting location overflowing with lovable and hilarious characters, Gravity Falls broke every barrier imaginable and made what, for good reason, became one of the most beloved shows of the era."

In 2015, Uproxx ranked Gravity Falls as the third Current Kids Cartoon That Adults Need to be Watching. In 2018, IndieWire ranked Gravity Falls at number 12 on their list of The 50 Best Animated Series Of All Time. In 2019, Yardbarker ranked Gravity Falls number 21 on their list of The 25 Greatest Animated Shows of All Time. Also in 2019, IGN placed Gravity Falls at Number 19 on their list titled The 25 Best Adult Cartoon TV Series and The A.V. Club placed Gravity Falls at number 48 on their list of The 100 Best TV Shows of the 2010s.

=== Ratings ===
A special preview of the series following the Disney Channel Original Movie Let It Shine was watched by 3.4 million viewers. The series garnered high viewership on its fifth episode, which aired on July 13, 2012, and attracted 3.6 million viewers. On March 15, 2013, the episode "The Deep End" was watched by 4.5 million viewers after the premiere of Wizards of Waverly Place's The Wizards Return: Alex vs. Alex, becoming the highest-rated episode of the series.

Later moving on to Disney XD, the episode "A Tale of Two Stans" became the highest-rated telecast ever on Disney XD, with 1.91 million viewers. In addition to total viewers, "A Tale of Two Stans" also set a network record in kids ages 2–11 (1.036 million), boys ages 2–11 (686,000), boys ages 6–11 (574,000), kids ages 6–14 (1.279 million) and boys ages 6–14 (856,000). In 2015, Gravity Falls accounted for Disney XD's top seven regular animated series telecasts of all time among kids ages 6–11. During the week of July 12–18, 2015, Gravity Falls was the top-rated program in its 8:30 p.m. timeslot across kids and boys ages 2–11, 6–11 and 6–14. That same week, it was also cable TV's number 1 scripted telecast in total viewers, according to estimates from Nielsen Ratings.

Gravity Falls ranked as Disney XD's number 1 series of 2015 across all target demographics with an average of 1.8 million viewers per episode. Additionally, Gravity Falls ranked as 2015's third animated cable TV series in boys ages 9–14. In kids ages 6–11, the series averaged 654,000 viewers and 790,000 in kids ages 2–11. Among boys ages 6–14, it pulled in 680,000 views. It was strong viewership in Disney XD's core demographics, but it also made it clear that older teens and young adults made up more than half of the show's audience, according to Variety.

In February 2016, Gravity Falls was the number 1 regular series telecast on record across kids ages 6–11 (1.0 million/4.4 rating), boys ages 6–11 (642,000/5.3 rating), kids ages 2–11 (1.3 million/3.4 rating) and boys ages 2–11 (797,000/4.0 rating). The series finale "Weirdmageddon 3: Take Back The Falls" beat the ratings record previously held by "A Tale of Two Stans" becoming Disney XD's most-watched telecast ever, with 2.47 million viewers in the United States. "Weirdmageddon 3: Take Back The Falls" also established new all-time network highs in kids ages 6–14 (1.5 million/4.1 rating) and boys ages 6–14 (909,000/5.0 rating). The all-day Gravity Falls marathon that preceded the premiere of "Weirdmageddon 3: Take Back The Falls" generated 10.7 million unique total viewers, of which 5.4 million were kids ages 2–14.

Marketing for The Book of Bill in January 2024 revealed that Gravity Falls was one of the top 50 shows with the most hours watched on Disney+ of all time and that more than half of the viewers were families with kids over the age of thirteen.

=== Influence, legacy, and industry impact ===
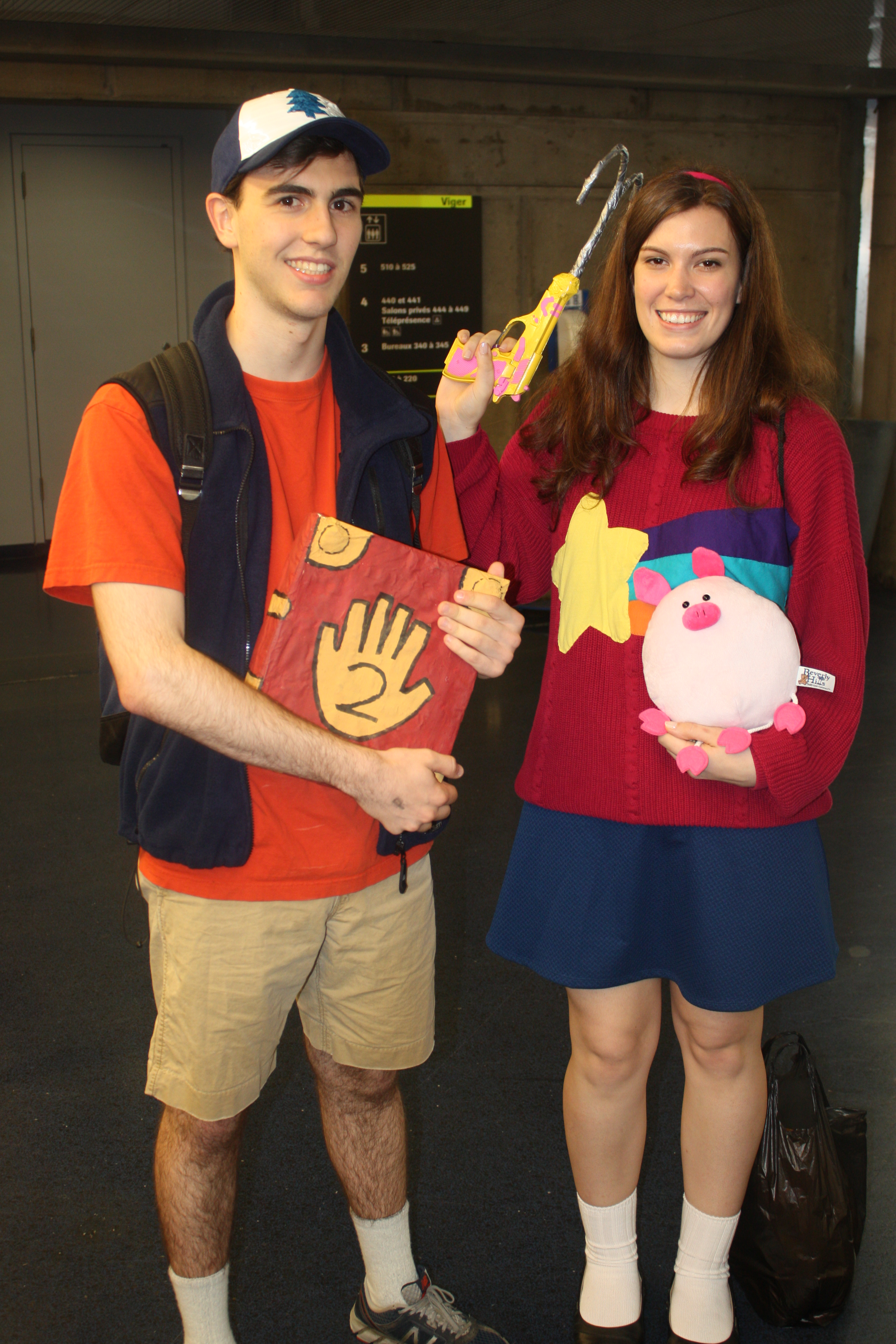
Fans cosplaying as Dipper and Mabel at Montreal Comiccon in 2015

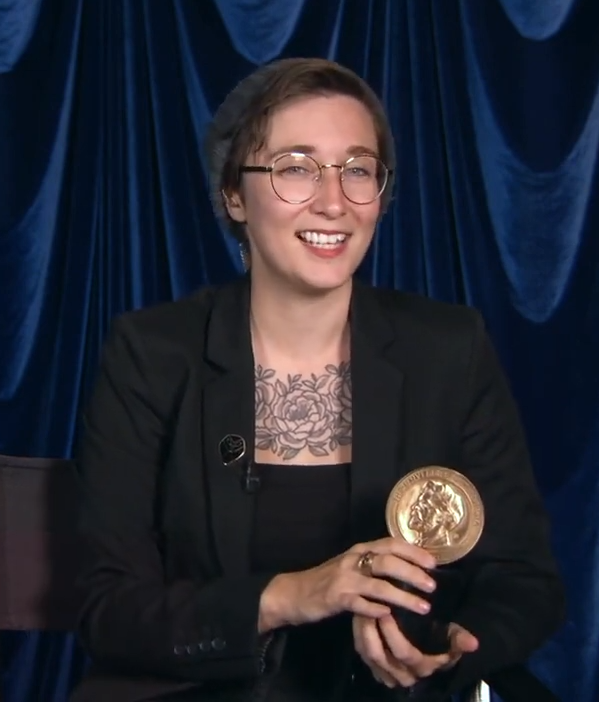
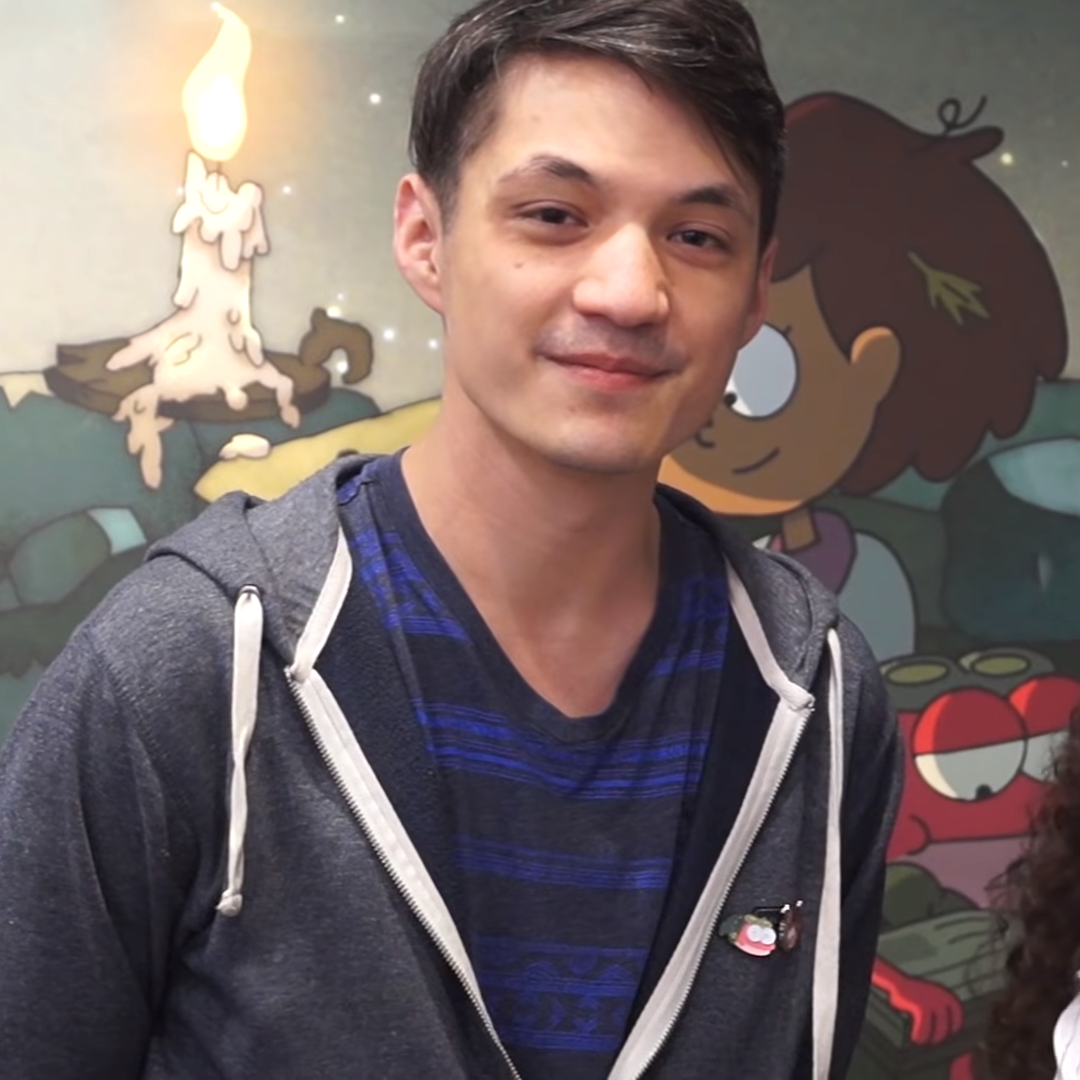
Some of the notable animators who worked on Gravity Falls include Dana Terrace and Matt Braly

Gravity Falls has been considered to be an influence for many animated shows that followed it, including Steven Universe, Star vs. the Forces of Evil, The Owl House, Amphibia, and Rick and Morty, with the latter three including direct references to Gravity Falls in the form of Easter eggs. Other examples of the show's influence include LGBTQ representation and series-long story arcs as opposed to isolated single-episode stories. The show also maintains a loyal and passionate fandom, even years after the series finale. Hirsch hid a variety of codes, cryptograms, backwards messages, and other secret clues for fans to find in every episode, which often contributed to the show's mysteries and lore. Some have compared Gravity Falls to more adult-oriented mystery shows such as Lost, Twin Peaks, and The X-Files. While it was on the air, the show was Disney XD's highest-rated series, with an average of 1.8 million viewers per episode.

In the summer of 2016, Hirsch threw an international treasure hunt known as the "Cipher Hunt", the goal of which was to find the real-life Bill Cipher statue briefly glimpsed in the series finale. It ran from July 20 to August 3, 2016, and involved retrieving and decoding riddles and codes hidden in various locations worldwide. One clue involved a 2,000-piece jigsaw puzzle that took several days to complete with someone almost always working on it. On August 3, 2016, the statue was found in a forest in Reedsport, Oregon. While the first ones to the statue received various prizes, Hirsch made it clear that the hunt itself was the real treasure. On August 3, the statue was removed by authorities due to a property dispute and was temporarily held at the Reedsport police department while Hirsch arranged for it to be moved somewhere else. By August 5, the statue temporarily ended up in Bicentennial Park in Reedsport, before being permanently relocated to Confusion Hill in Piercy, California a few weeks later.

In celebration of the release of Journal 3 and the end of the Gravity Falls series, Oh My Disney and Cyclops Print Works teamed up with Gallery Nucleus in Alhambra, California to hold an official Gravity Falls art show, titled Farewell to the Falls: A Gravity Falls Art Show, on August 6–21, 2016. Creator Alex Hirsch along with other production staff and professional illustrators contributed new and original artwork to this exhibition. Some fans camped out overnight to see the show and some works of art sold for over $1,000.

On August 8, 2020, Disney Channel aired a Gravity Falls-inspired episode of the show Amphibia titled "Wax Museum". The episode served as a tribute to Gravity Falls and features Alex Hirsch in a voice role.

On September 11, 2020, a short was released on the Disney Channel YouTube channel called "Gravity Falls x Line Rider". The short is based on the Internet game Line Rider. It is the first of a new series of shorts for Disney. Disney partnered with Line Rider artists Mark Robbins, Ben Harvey and David Lu for the series.

On September 25, 2020, a Gravity Falls short was released on the Disney Channel YouTube channel called "Call Me Maybe Parody". In the short, Mabel sings "Call Me Mabel", a parody of Carly Rae Jepsen's "Call Me Maybe". The short was released as a part of a series called "Broken Karaoke" where various Disney characters sing parodies of pop songs.

On October 3, 2021, the television show The Simpsons aired the episode "Bart's in Jail!" which featured a brief cameo of Bill Cipher as one of Loki's many incarnations, voiced by Alex Hirsch in a guest role.

Several former storyboard artists and production crew members who worked on Gravity Falls have gone on to create their own series and movies, including Matt Braly (a former director and storyboard artist who went on to create Amphibia), Dana Terrace (a former storyboard artist who went on to direct on the first season of DuckTales and create The Owl House), Chris Houghton (a former storyboard artist who went on to create Big City Greens with his brother Shane), Mike Rianda (a former creative director, and writer who went on to direct and co-write the film The Mitchells vs. the Machines) Shion Takeuchi (a former writer who went on to create Inside Job), and Jeff Rowe (a writer on the show who went on to co-write The Mitchells vs. the Machines and write and direct Teenage Mutant Ninja Turtles: Mutant Mayhem).

=== Awards and nominations ===
Year	Award	Category	Nominee	Result	Ref.
2012	2nd Annual Behind the Voice Actor Awards	Best Female Lead Vocal Performance in a Television Series – Comedy/Musical	Kristen Schaal as "Mabel Pines"	Won	
2012	2nd Annual Behind the Voice Actor Awards	Best Female Lead Vocal Performance in a Television Series – Comedy/Musical	Linda Cardellini as "Wendy"	Nominated	
2012	2nd Annual Behind the Voice Actor Awards	Best Female Vocal Performance in a Television Series in a Supporting Role – Comedy/Musical	Jennifer Coolidge as "Lazy Susan"	Nominated	
2013	2013 Teen Choice Awards	Choice TV: Animated Show	Gravity Falls	Nominated	
2013	40th Annie Awards	Outstanding Achievement, Production Design in an Animated Television/Broadcast Production	Ian Worrel for "Tourist Trapped"	Nominated	
2013	40th Annie Awards	Outstanding Achievement, Voice Acting in an Animated Television/Broadcast Production	Kristen Schaal as "Mabel Pines" in "Tourist Trapped"	Won	
2013	2013 Promax Awards	Promotion/Marketing Presentation – Print Or Specialty – Gold	Disney Channel's Gravity Falls Affiliate Mailer	Won	
2013	3rd Annual Behind the Voice Actor Awards	Best Female Lead Vocal Performance in a Television Series – Comedy/Musical	Kristen Schaal as "Mabel Pines"	Won	
2013	3rd Annual Behind the Voice Actor Awards	Best Female Vocal Performance in a Television Series in a Supporting Role – Comedy/Musical	Linda Cardellini as "Wendy"	Nominated	
2013	Kids' Choice Awards Argentina 2013	Best Animated Series	Gravity Falls	Nominated	
2013	2nd Annual PAAFTJ Television Awards	Best Animated Series	Gravity Falls	Nominated	
2013	2nd Annual PAAFTJ Television Awards	Best Directing for an Animated Series	John Aoshima for "Tourist Trapped"	Nominated	
2013	2nd Annual PAAFTJ Television Awards	Best Writing for an Animated Series	Mike Rianda and Alex Hirsch for "The Inconveniencing"	Nominated	
2013	2nd Annual PAAFTJ Television Awards	Best Voice Actor in an Animated Series	Alex Hirsch	Nominated	
2013	2nd Annual PAAFTJ Television Awards	Best Voice Actress in an Animated Series	Kristen Schaal	Nominated	
2013	2nd Annual PAAFTJ Television Awards	Best Artistic/Visual Achievement in an Animated Series	Phil Rynda (production design), Ian Worrel (art direction), Chris Houghton and 'C' Raggio IV (character design) and Mark Garcia (storyboard) for "Fight Fighters"	Nominated	
2013	2nd Annual PAAFTJ Television Awards	Best Main Title Theme Music (New Shows Only)	Gravity Falls	Won	
2014	2014 Kids' Choice Awards	Favorite Animated Animal Sidekick	Waddles	Nominated	
2014	66th Primetime Creative Arts Emmy Awards	Outstanding Individual Achievement in Animation	Ian Worrel for "Dreamscaperers"	Won	
2014	41st Annie Awards	Best Animated TV/Broadcast Production For Children's Audience	Gravity Falls	Nominated	
2014	41st Annie Awards	Outstanding Achievement for Directing in an Animated TV/Broadcast Production	John Aoshima	Nominated	
2014	41st Annie Awards	Outstanding Achievement for Storyboarding in an Animated TV/Broadcast Production	Alonso Ramos-Ramirez	Nominated	
2014	61st Golden Reel Awards	Best Sound Editing – Sound Effects, Foley, Dialogue and ADR Animation in Television	Heather Olsen, Robbi Smith, Aran Tanchum and John Lampinen for "Gideon Rises"	Nominated	
2014	2014 Teen Choice Awards	Choice TV: Animated Show	Gravity Falls	Nominated	
2014	4th Annual Behind the Voice Actor Awards	Best Male Lead Vocal Performance in a Television Series – Comedy/Musical	Alex Hirsch as "Grunkle Stan"	Nominated	
2014	4th Annual Behind the Voice Actor Awards	Best Female Vocal Performance in a Television Series in a Supporting Role – Comedy/Musical	Jessica DiCicco as "Tambry"	Nominated	
2014	4th Annual Behind the Voice Actor Awards	Best Male Vocal Performance in a Television Series in a Guest Role – Comedy/Musical	Peter Serafinowicz as "Blind Ivan"	Nominated	
2014	4th Annual Behind the Voice Actor Awards	Best Female Vocal Performance in a Television Series in a Guest Role – Comedy/Musical	Jessica DiCicco as "Giffany"	Nominated	
2014	4th Annual Behind the Voice Actor Awards	Best Vocal Ensemble in a Television Series – Comedy/Musical	Gravity Falls	Nominated	
2015	42nd Annie Awards	Best Animated TV/Broadcast Production for Children's Audience	Gravity Falls	Won	
2015	42nd Annie Awards	Outstanding Achievement, Directing in an Animated TV/Broadcast Production	Rob Renzetti	Nominated	
2015	42nd Annie Awards	Outstanding Achievement, Storyboarding in an Animated TV/Broadcast Production	Luke Weber, Alonso Ramirez Ramos, Neil Graf, and Steve Heneveld	Nominated	
2015	5th Critics' Choice Television Awards	Best Animated Series	Gravity Falls	Nominated	
2015	67th Primetime Creative Arts Emmy Awards	Outstanding Individual Achievement in Animation	Alonso Ramirez Ramos for "Not What He Seems"	Won	
2015	20th BAFTA Children's Awards	Best International Series	Production team of Gravity Falls	Won	
2015	62nd Golden Reel Awards	Best Sound Editing – Sound Effects, Foley, Dialogue and ADR Animation in Television	Heather Olsen, Robbi Smith, Aran Tanchum and John Lampinen for "Into the Bunker"	Nominated	
2015	2015 Teen Choice Awards	Choice TV: Animated Show	Gravity Falls	Nominated	
2015	5th Annual Behind the Voice Actor Awards	Best Male Vocal Performance in a Television Series in a Supporting Role	J.K. Simmons as "Ford Pines"	Won	
2015	5th Annual Behind the Voice Actor Awards	Best Female Vocal Performance in a Television Series in a Supporting Role	Niki Yang as "Candy Chiu"	Nominated	
2015	5th Annual Behind the Voice Actor Awards	Best Vocal Ensemble in a Television Series	Gravity Falls	Nominated	
2016	43rd Annie Awards	Best Animated TV/Broadcast Production For Children's Audience	"Not What He Seems"	Nominated	
2016	43rd Annie Awards	Outstanding Achievement, Directing in an Animated TV/Broadcast Production	Matt Braly for "Northwest Mansion Mystery"	Won	
2016	43rd Annie Awards	Outstanding Achievement, Production Design in an Animated TV/Broadcast Production	Ian Worrel and Jeffrey Thompson for "Xpcveaoqfoxso (Weirdmageddon)"	Nominated	
2016	43rd Annie Awards	Outstanding Achievement, Writing in an Animated TV/Broadcast Production	Alex Hirsch, Shion Takeuchi, Josh Weinstein, Jeff Rowe, and Matt Chapman for "Not What He Seems"	Nominated	
2016	2016 Kids' Choice Awards	Favorite Cartoon	Gravity Falls	Nominated	
2016	75th Annual Peabody Awards	Excellence in Children's/Youth Programming	Gravity Falls	Nominated	
2016	2016 Teen Choice Awards	Choice TV Show: Animated	Gravity Falls	Nominated	
2016	2016 Kids' Choice Awards Mexico	Favorite Cartoon	Gravity Falls	Nominated	
2016	2016 Kids' Choice Awards Argentina	Favorite Cartoon	Gravity Falls	Won	
2016	2016 Kids' Choice Awards Brazil	Favourite International Animation	Gravity Falls	Nominated	
2016	63rd Golden Reel Awards	Best Sound Editing – Sound Effects, Foley, Dialogue and ADR Animation in Television	Heather Olsen for Gravity Falls	Nominated	
2017	44th Annie Awards	Outstanding Achievement, Writing in an Animated TV/Broadcast Production	Shion Takeuchi, Mark Rizzo, Jeff Rowe, Josh Weinstein and Alex Hirsch for "Weirdmageddon Part 3: Take Back the Falls"	Nominated	
2017	44th Annie Awards	Outstanding Achievement, Editorial in an Animated TV/Broadcast Production	Kevin Locarro, Andrew Sorcini, Nancy Frazen and Tony Mizgalski for "Weirdmageddon Part 3: Take Back the Falls"	Nominated	
2017	2017 Teen Choice Awards	Choice TV: Animated Show	Gravity Falls	Nominated	
2017	64th Golden Reel Awards	Best Sound Editing – Sound Effects, Foley, Dialogue and ADR in Television Animation	Heather Olsen, Robbi Smith, Aran Tanchum and John Lampinen for "Weirdmageddon 3: Take Back the Falls"	Nominated	
2018	2018 Kids' Choice Awards Mexico	Favorite Animated Series	Gravity Falls	Nominated	
2018	2018 Kids' Choice Awards Brazil	Favourite Cartoon	Gravity Falls	Nominated	
2018	2018 Kids' Choice Awards Argentina	Favorite Animated Series	Gravity Falls	Nominated	
2024	66th Annual Grammy Awards	Best Recording Package	iam8bit, art director (Brad Breeck) for Gravity Falls	Nominated	

== Future ==
On July 14, 2017, Hirsch revealed that he and Disney had discussed making a Gravity Falls film. Disney ultimately passed on the project, as the studio felt that the show "wasn't big enough to warrant [a film]"; Hirsch stated that he was still interested in the idea. In February 2018, on the second anniversary of the series finale, Hirsch used a cipher to announce Gravity Falls: Lost Legends, a continuation of the Gravity Falls story in a new graphic novel that was later released on July 24, 2018. In an interview with Inverse in March 2021, Hirsch expressed interest in continuing the story of Gravity Falls in the form of a video game that "is really, really in-depth to the lore of the series and includes new canon that has been in the periphery of the series." In June 2024, Disney Television Vice President Meredith Roberts revealed that they were having discussions with Hirsch about the show, adding, "never say never".
