= Shion Takeuchi =

American television writer, showrunner, and producer

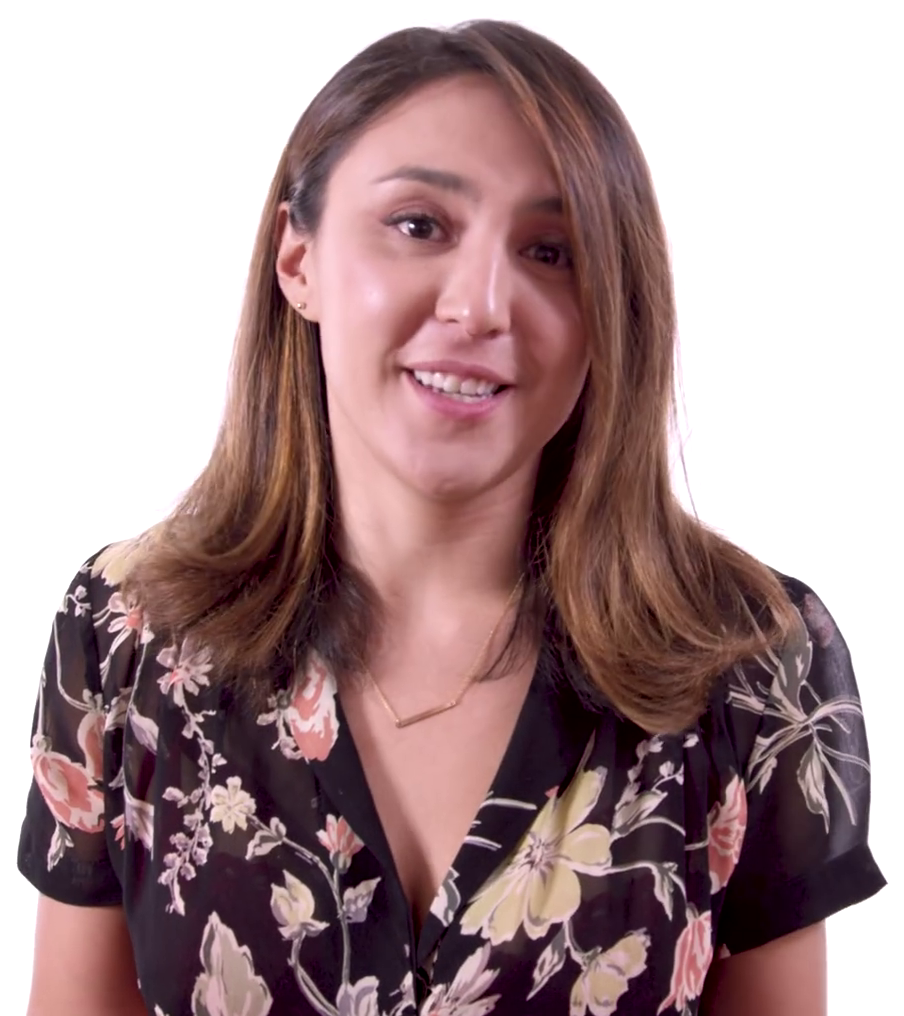
- Takeuchi in 2018
- Born: Shion Takeuchi; September 5, 1988 (age 38); Northborough, Massachusetts, U.S.
- Education: California Institute of the Arts (BFA)
- Occupations: Writer; animator; storyboard artist; producer
- Years active: 2009–present
- Known for: Inside Job

Shion Takeuchi (Note: Japanese: 竹内 紫苑, romanized: Takeuchi Shion) (/ˈʃiːoʊn ˌtɑːkeɪˈuːtʃiː/ SHEE-ohn TAH-kay-OO-chee; born September 5, 1988) is an American animator, screenwriter, storyboard artist, producer and showrunner. She is the creator of the Netflix television series Inside Job and has written and produced for shows such as Regular Show, Gravity Falls, Disenchantment and others. She was nominated twice for an Annie Award in "Writing in an Animated Television/Broadcast Production," in 2016 and 2017, for her work on Gravity Falls.

== Early life and education ==
Takeuchi was born on September 5, 1988, and raised in the suburbs of Boston, Massachusetts, where her parents were a technology company executive and former translator. She attended the California Institute of the Arts (CalArts), graduating in 2010 with a BFA in animation. Her thesis film was titled When the Time is Ripe, a coming-of-age story about a Jewish pear.

== Career ==
Takeuchi worked as an intern on the animated series Adventure Time during the first season of its development before joining animator J. G. Quintel to work as a writer and storyboard artist on his Cartoon Network series Regular Show. She was then hired to work in the story department at Pixar where she was involved in the production of the films Monsters University (2013) and Inside Out (2015). She later left Pixar to work as a writer on the Disney animated series Gravity Falls during its second season, where she stayed until the show's conclusion in 2016. Takeuchi also worked as a writer on the Netflix animated series Disenchantment and the Amazon Prime Video animated series Lost in Oz. In 2018, streaming platform Netflix signed a multi-year, multi-project deal with Takeuchi.

=== Inside Job ===
In 2019, Netflix announced the production of the adult animated series Inside Job, created and produced by Takeuchi. The show premiered on October 22, 2021 and went on to become the fifth most streamed show on Netflix in the United States and eighth most streamed on the platform globally within a week of its release.

== Filmography ==
=== Film ===
Year	Title	Role	Notes
2013	Monsters University	Story artist	
2015	Inside Out	Story artist	

=== Television ===
Year	Title	Role	Notes
2010	Adventure Time	Intern	
2010–2011	Regular Show	Writer, storyboard artist	6 episodes
2014–2016	Gravity Falls	Writer	
2015	Long Live the Royals	Story	4 episodes, miniseries
2016	We Bare Bears	Story	3 episodes
2016–2018	Lost in Oz	Writer	8 episodes
2018–2019	Disenchantment	Writer, staff writer	20 episodes, wrote 2 episodes
2021–2022	Inside Job	Creator, executive producer, writer	20 episodes ordered, 18 released

== Nominations and awards ==
Year	Award	Category	Notes	Result	Ref.
2016	43rd Annie Awards	Writing in an Animated Television/Broadcast Production	Episode: S2 E11: Not What He Seems	Nominated	
2017	44th Annie Awards	Writing in an Animated Television/Broadcast Production	Episode: S2 E20: Weirdmageddon 3: Take Back The Falls	Nominated	

== See also ==
- Inside Job
- Alex Hirsch
- Gravity Falls
