= Backward speech =

- Symptoms: Speaking by spontaneously and accurately reversing words
- Causes: Can be caused by: genetics; head injury; side effects of neurosurgery

The trait of backward speech is described as an ability to spontaneously and accurately reverse words. Two strategies of word reversal were reported: reversal according to the phonetic structure of the words or reversal according to their spelling. In the 1980s, Nelson Cowan hypothesized that this ability is afforded by an extraordinary working memory. Recent studies have provided evidence that the working memory is indeed involved in this ability and further suggested that genetic factors may contribute to this trait.

== Some cases ==
- Patients of Nelson Cowan.
- Italian-speaking patient that gained the ability to speak backwards after neurosurgery.
- A patient that could talk backward after a head injury which resulted in conversion disorder.
- Serbian family with the ability to speak backwards voluntarily.
