= List of Medabots episodes =

This is a list of episodes for the Medabots anime series and its sequel, Medabots Spirits (Medarot Damashii in Japan), which are based on the video game franchise of the same name. Overall, the television series was broadcast in Japan on TV Tokyo from July 2, 1999, to March 30, 2001. The original fifty-two-episode series was animated by Bee Train and was broadcast from July 2, 1999, to June 30, 2000. Spirits/Damashii was co-produced by Production I.G and Trans Arts and ran for thirty-nine episodes broadcast from July 7, 2000, to March 30, 2001.

Both series were originally licensed and localized into English by Nelvana; the first series was divided into two seasons for its U.S. broadcast and the episodes aired in a different order. The first U.S. season, consisting of 26 episodes, originally aired on the Fox Broadcasting Company's Fox Kids block from September 1, 2001, to April 27, 2002. Future episodes would premiere on ABC Family, which had already been airing reruns since March 4, 2002. The second U.S. season originally aired on ABC Family from July 1 to November 2, 2002, while Damashii first aired on the network from September 13, 2003, to May 8, 2004. Later episodes and reruns were aired as part of the Jetix block and Toon Disney's Jetix in November 2004.

The Japanese version has received a VHS and DVD release for the first series, while Damashii has only received a VHS release. On January 29, 2010, a Region 2 boxset release known as MEDAROT DVD BOX 1 was released containing the first thirty episodes, with a second boxset on February 19 finishing with the last twenty-two episodes. Two boxsets for Medarot Damashii were released on December 30, 2010. This was Damashii's first DVD release.

From 2002 to 2003, ADV Films released twelve volumes of both the first and second seasons. In 2007, Shout! Factory released the first season of the English version on Region 1 DVD. There were plans to release the second season on DVD, but was canceled. Both series are currently licensed by Discotek Media.

== Episode list ==
=== Medabots ===
==== Episodes 1-39 ====
Title	Ep. # (Prod.)	Ep. # (U.S.)	Original Airdate	English Airdate	Synopsis
"Stung by a Metabee"	1	1	July 2, 1999	September 1, 2001	In the future, people have their own battle robots called Medabots. The Rubberobo Gang fail to steal a Medabot medal from an injured scientist following a car accident because of the Phantom Renegade. He loses the medal which falls into the water followed by him. The next day, the Screws consisting of Samantha, Spike and Sloan challenge the Student Council to a submission Robattle for ownership of their classroom. Samantha and her cat-type Medabot Peppercat beat the Student Council President and his book-type Medabot Dr. Bokchoy. Ikki Tenryou is a boy who dreams of having his own Medabot which he cannot afford because he does not have enough money and his parents will not buy him one. He does find the Medabot medal that Phantom Renegade lost on the shore of the river. Spike and his dog-type Medabot Cyandog lose the unused Bombarder part meant for Samantha to the Rockers and their Medabots consisting of two devil-type Medabots Blackram and phoenix-type Medabot Phoenix. When his friend Erika and her sailor-type Medabot Sailor-Multi (nicknamed Brass) are challenged by the Rockers, Ikki persuades the local store owner Henry to sell him the Hercules beetle-type Medabot Metabee which is powered by the same medal. He defeats the Rockers as Metabee develops a mind of his own. Robattle stats: Peppercat acquires Dr. Bokchoy's right arm. Metabee acquires Blackram's Bombarder.
"Return of the Screws"	2	2	July 9, 1999	September 1, 2001	After the victory against the Rockers, Ikki and Metabee have been having a hard time getting along amidst Erika writing about how they defeated the Rockers. Its because of Ikki's status that the principal has Ikki spared from the gym teacher Coach Mountain's wrath for being late to school. With Metabee having followed Ikki to school, Sloan tries to Robattle Ikki with his tortoise-type Medabot Totalizer only for him to get in trouble with Coach Mountain. After Ikki and Metabee's latest falling out, Ikki is enlisted by the Student Council to help reclaim their classroom from the Screws. Having to make up with Metabee, Ikki has Metabee face off against Samantha and Peppercat. Metabee defeats Peppercat by sending some fountain water onto Peppercat. Afterwards, Samantha's intimidating but frail supervisor Baron von Banish shows up to Robattle Ikki and Metabee with his Banchou-type Medabot Banisher. (Note: The English dub of the Medabot Vital Stats lists Banisher as a ban-type Medabot.) Metabee easily defeats Banisher as the Student Council thanks Ikki. This causes another disagreement between Ikki and Metabee. Robattle stats: Metabee acquires Peppercat's right arm and Banisher's legs.
"Running Scared"	3	3	July 16, 1999	September 8, 2001	As Coach Mountain hates Medabots, having them on school property has become a risk as he punishes the Screws by having them do laps. Because of getting a low score on the test by Coach Mountain, Ikki and the Screws end up doing a lot of laps. One day, Ikki and the Screws spot Coach Mountain with a Medabot. Following Coach Mountain into the night life of Riverview City, Ikki, Erika, and the Screws find that Coach Mountain is planning to build a park there. Unfortunately, he and his mole-type Medabot Digmole are being beaten by some gangsters where their leader is using the elephant-type Medabot Megaphant. Ikki steps in. Despite Megaphant's shield defense and iron ball attack, Ikki and Metabee were able to come up with a strategy to defeat Megaphant. Afterwards, Coach Mountain tearfully thanks Ikki for his help. The next day, Coach Mountain has Ikki, Erika, and the Screws run laps for being out in the city at night and wants their sweat to water his new park. Robattle stats: Digmole loses to Megaphant. Metabee acquires Megaphant's left shield arm.
"The Legendary Medafighter"	4	4	July 23, 1999	September 15, 2001	Ikki is rescued from an approaching car by a girl named Karen who goes to Rosewood Private School. Erika later mentions that a Legendary Medafigher attends Rosewood Private School causing Erika and Ikki to sneak in. While Ikki, Metabee, and Erika managed to fool the guard, the Screws fail at that. With Rosewood Private School being gigantic, Ikki, Metabee, and Erika discover traps in the area as they encounter a boy named Eddie and his Golem-type Medabot Gloomeg (Note: The English dub of the Metabot Vital Stats lists Gloomeg as a stone-type Medabot.). They also encounter Koji Karakuchi and his sabretooth tiger-type Medabot Sumilodon who bests Gloomeg. Ikki runs into Karin again as she saves him and Erika from a trap. When Ikki and Erika arrive at the school, they ask around as all they get are claims that the Legendary Medafighter owns either a Blackram or a Megaphant. Ikki is then confronted by Koji. Before he and Metabee can engage Koji and Sumilodon, Karin is abducted by Eddie and Gloomeg to draw out the Legendary Medafighter. The other students bring out their Medabots and attack Eddie and Gloomeg. Karin breaks up the attack revealing herself as the Legendary Medafighter. She brings out her nurse-type Medabot Neutranurse who heals Eddie and Gloomeg. Later that evening, Ikki and Erika are walking back to the gate. While Karin stops and offers to give them a ride, Koji also stops and states that they need the exercise. As for the Screws, they are still lost on the property. Robattle stats: Gloomeg loses to Sumilodon.
"The Old Man and the Sea Monster"	5	5	July 30, 1999	September 22, 2001	Ikki, Metabee, Erika, Jouzou Tenryo, and Salty are at the beach. While Jouzou sleeps under the sun, Ikki and Erika have some fun under the Sun while Metabee notes that he cannot swim as he is taunted by a boy named Ryan and his two unnamed friends. Ikki and Erika then hear of a sea monster sighting in the area. After meeting an old man who is doing some fishing with his octopus-type Medabot Octoclam (Note: This Octoclam was misnamed "Tentaclam" in the English dub and the Medabot Vital Stats lists him as a clam-type Medabot.), Ikki and Erika run into Ryan's group as he and Metabee are goaded into Robattling him and his shark-type Medabot Sharkkhan. Because Metabee is not compatible in water, Mr. Referee takes this as a forfeit as Ryan states that the submission rules state that Metabee must give up one of his Medaparts for keeps. Metabee loses his legs and makes use of Banisher's legs. Ikki and Metabee run into the old man again as they ask him for help in obtaining aquatic Medaparts. He gives them one of Octoclam's extra legs and puts them through some training. When the sea monster confronts Erika, it is then discovered to be a disguise worn by Sharkkhan and his accomplices jellyfish-type Medabot Giggly Jelly and manta ray-type Medabot Flatstick. Ryan and his friends are responsible as Ikki challenges Ryan to a rematch. Thanks to some advice from the old man, Metabee using Octoclam's legs was able to defeat Sharkkhan. Afterwards, Ryan admits to Ikki that they were acting against the tourists who were littering and he and his friends apologize to Ikki and Erika. As for Jouzou, he slept too long and got sunburned. Robattle stats: Metabee loses legs to Sharkkhan (though he regains them offscreen). Octoclam gives one of his extra legs to Metabee.
"Spaceship Superstars"	6	27	August 6, 1999	July 1, 2002	Erika and Brass have encountered an alien spaceship when walking home at night. She plans to use Metabee as bait to draw out the aliens where they accidentally capture alien expert Dr. Scrounge. The aliens are later revealed to be the Rubberobo Gang as its members Seaslug, Gillgirl, Squidguts, and Shrimplips lead the other members into passing themselves off as aliens. This ruse gets unmasked by Metabee where the spaceship was carried by the bat-type Medabots called Noctobats causing Erika to run off. After a talk with the chick salesman, Erika returns and faces off against the Rubberobo Gang and their Dogū-type Medabot Gorem. (Note: The English dub of the Metabot Vital Status lists Gorem as a clay model-type Medabot.) With Erika emerging victorious, Seaslug wants to continue the Robattle with the Noctobats only for Mr. Referee to not allow it. When Seaslug kicks him while stating that villains do not play by the rules, Mr. Referee calls upon Penalty Box (Note: Penalty Box is actually the ninja-type Medabot Wire-Ninja who was equipped with satellite parts and was called "Terakado 3".) to take out Seaslug causing the Rubberobo Gang to retreat. As Ikki hopes that Erika has learned her lesson, she then mentions a rumor about a sea creature at the water park. Robattle stats: Brass acquires Gorem's left arm.
"The Gimme Ghost"	7	6	August 13, 1999	September 29, 2001	Due to the Phantom Renegade sightings, Erika is hired by Henry to write about him. She turns Henry down and plans to write about the Gimme Ghost, a spectre that is said to steal the medals of different Medabots. Koji mentions that Sumilodon's medal was stolen and asks Karin to help retrieve it. Ikki, Metabee, Erika, Brass, Karin, and Neutranurse head to where the Gimme Ghost was sighted. They all get separated. Ikki finds that Brass and Neutranurse had their medals stolen. He ends up stumbling upon the Rubberobo Gang who have captured Erika and Karin. Upon calling Metabee to rescue him from the Rubberobo Gang's ghost attacks, they end up Robattling Seaslug and his ghost-type Medabot Mistyghost who can make multiple projections. The Phantom Renegade appears and exposes the illusions enabling Metabee to defeat Mistyghost. Both the Rubberobo Gang and the Phantom Renegade get away while Erika and Karin are rescued. Robattle stats: Metabee acquires Mistyghost's head.
"No Body Home"	8	32	August 20, 1999	July 12, 2002	While working on a school assignment, Ikki and Metabee find a mermaid medal which are said to be rare and valuable. When Ikki places the medal into his Medawatch, he learns that the medal belongs to the mermaid-type Medabot Oceana who got separated from her owner Hannah. With Brass offering her body to host Oceana's medal, Ikki and Karin locate Hannah who had lost Oceana's body when she moved away from the area. Ikki and Erika were able to trace Oceana's body to the secluded home of a boy named Norbert. Evading the traps, Ikki and Erika find that Norbert has Oceana in a glass that is leak proof, dust proof, and transport proof. After an ejection, Ikki and Erika plan to get back in as they call every food place they delivered. Despite getting back in, Ikki and Metabee soon face off against Norbert and his crab-type Medabot Kuraba. Oceana's body is freed as Metabee defeats Kuraba. Hannah is reunited with Oceana as she and Metabee say their goodbyes. Robattle stats: Metabee acquires Kuraba's right arm.
"Cyandog Bites Back"	9	7	August 27, 1999	October 6, 2001	Samantha and Peppercat defeat a Medafighter's snake-type Medabot Maxsnake and claim one of its arms. Sloan and Totalizer defeat a Medafighter's musical instrument-type Medabot Volume10 and claim its legs. Spike and Cyandog lose to a Medafighter's monkey-type Medabot Monkey Gong causing Samantha to step in and defeat Monkey Gong. Displeased with Spike's 11 losses, Samantha fires him from the Screws. He tries to redeem himself by Robattling the Ankle Biters and their bear-type Medabot Churleybear which does not go well. Samantha gets enraged upon Erika's news of this as Erika was unaware that Spike was fired from the Screws as Spike had still claimed that he's still with them. Ikki and Metabee learn about what happened. Spike and Cyandog plan to leave town only to be intercepted by Metabee who plans to improve their Robattle skills. When it does not work, Ikki and Metabee find that Cyandog is carrying a monkey medal which is used for Medabots who specialize in hand-to-hand combat as Spike thought the medal was cool. Ikki and Spike hear from Erika that Samantha is going to confront the Ankle Biters. When they arrive to witness the confrontation, Ikki, Erika, and Spike witness Peppercat being defeated by Churleybear's gravity attacks. With advice from Erika and the chick salesman, Spike goes up against the Anklebiters as Ikki lends Cyandog the arm he won from Kuraba in the last episode. Cyandog manages to defeat Churleybear. Spike then tries to beat Metabee afterwards only to lose. Samantha tells Spike that he is fired again as he tries to pitch various ways he can make it up to her. Robattle stats: Cyandog acquires Churlybear's right arm.
"For Better for Worse, Part 1"	10	8	September 3, 1999	October 13, 2001	With the World Robattle Championship taking place in Switzerland, Ikki is watching on TV as he watches a match between Kenya's Victor and his king lion-type Medabot Warbandit against Spain's Rolando and his bull-type Medabot Redmatador. Metabee's shenanigans ends up breaking the vase with its water shortening out the TV costing Ikki his allowance. While Henry suggests that Metabee should get cleaned and polished for the Citywide Robattle Tournament, Metabee will not let Ikki remove his medal as Henry suggest having it housed in a spare body as he loans him a spare tin pet. The manager advises Henry that nothing better happen to the tinpet or else it will be taken out of his salary. Ikki puts together a spare body (consisting of Mistyghost's head, Megaphant's left shield arm, Dr. Bokchoy's right arm, and Octoclam's legs) for Metabee to be temporarily housed in only for Metabee to think that he is being replaced, trash the body, and run off planning to win without him. When it comes to the Citywide Robattle Tournament, the Rubberobo Gang are preparing for their next plot. The Robattles are intense until only Ikki and Koji remain. Ikki's attempt to make up with Metabee gets foiled by Spike. When Ikki and Metabee face off against Koji and Sumilodon, Metabee refuses to follow Ikki's advice as he is defeated by Sumilodon.
"For Better for Worse, Part 2"	11	9	September 10, 1999	October 20, 2001	Continuing from the last episode, Koji berets Ikki for not being a worthy opponent and calls him an incompetent Robattler. He gets his Citywide Robattle Tournament trophy from Mr. Referee where Koji states that he will allow a rematch with Ikki if he can become worthy in 24 hours and meet him at his temple. Metabee's medal is missing as he, Erika, Karin, and the Screws try to find it. When it is not found, Ikki returns home and fixes Metabee's body. Meanwhile, Metabee's medal is found by the Rubberobo Gang. They place it in the body of the tanuki-type Medabot Agadema. (Note: The English dub of the Medabot Vital Stats lists Agadema as a raccoon-type Medabot) Ikki, Erika, and Karin resume their search for Metabee's medal as Salty tracks it to an abandoned warehouse. They are ambushed by the Rubberobo Gang as the Screws were also captured and Salty is locked outside. Metabee in Agadema's body refuses to follow the Rubberobo Gang's orders as Ikki finally explains about the tinpet. In the nick of time, the Phantom Renegade arrives and rescues everyone. While the Screws face off against the Noctobats, Ikki puts Metabee's medal into his body as he, Erika, and Karin take their leave as the Phantom Renegade makes off with a bag of medals. Upon arriving at Koji's temple, Ikki and Metabee face off against Koji and Sumilodon. Despite some difficulty, Metabee manages to defeat Sumilodon as Mr. Referee declares Ikki and Metabee the official winners. Henry shows up asking for the spare tinpet back causing Ikki and Metabee to run off to take care of the spare tinpet.
"Mystery Medabot"	12	10	September 17, 1999	October 27, 2001	During a heavy rainstorm, Ikki and Metabee get a glimpse of a mysterious Medabot who does not want to have his name revealed after they and Erika witness him save a puppy. Because of the heavy rain done to the houses, the Rubberobo Gang begin their next plot by doing a renovation plot that involves their fox-type Medabot Foxuno. They plan to turn Riverview City into "Rubberobo Land". This plan continues until they reach the Tenryou residents as Chidori is having a hard time picking what her house should be shaped like. Metabee encounters the mysterious Medabot and learns that his name is Rokusho. Ikki and Metabee later face off against Foxuno as Rokusho watches from the roof. With Foxuno defeated, the Rubberobo Gang get away as Rokusho takes his leave. Robattle stats: Metabee acquires Foxuno's left arm.
"For Love or Robattle"	13	28	September 24, 1999	July 2, 2002	Samantha has developed a crush on a soccer player at Riverview Junior High named Nathan who she thinks is still angry at him. Erika learns of this and does some investigating. As Erika helps Samantha out, they learn that he hates Medafighters. Metabee even learns of Samantha's plight from Peppercat. She reveals to Metabee that Nathan used to be a Medafighter until he and his crayfish-type Medabot Stingray lost to Samantha. Erika finds that Nathan has still kept Stingray in good condition and persuades him to Robattle Samantha again to see how fun it can be. Though Samantha comes up on top, Nathan has found his liking of Robattles again as they are watched by a mysterious person. Robattle stats: Peppercat acquires Stingray's right arm.
"Welcome to Ninja World"	14	33	October 1, 1999	July 19, 2002	Ikki has won two tickets to Ninja World. While he plans on taking Karin, a jealous Erika takes the ticket instead. Things do no go well as Ikki and Erika argue on things. At one point, they stumble upon Rokusho meditating under a waterfall. They do watch a show involving the ninja-type Medabot Nin-Ninja and the kunoichi-type Medabot Icknite. After the show, Ikki and Erika are kidnapped by the Rubberobo Gang who have taken them to their hideout in the Ninja Castle. They reveal that they took the real medals of Nin-Ninja and Icknite out and replaced them with their own medals. After Ikki and Erika escape from their trap and reunite with Metabee and Brass, they end up having to put aside their current frustrations when Robattling the Rubberobo Gang despite a delay from Mr. Referee. Once Nin-Ninja and Icknite are defeated, the Rubberobo Gang got away as Rokusho gives Ikki and Metabee the real medals of Nin-Ninja and Icknite. Ikki and Erika end up arguing again when Erika blames Ikki for her not being able to photograph the ninja fight. Robattle stats: Metabee and Brass return the ninja medals.
"Eat, Drink, Man, Medabot"	15	34	October 8, 1999	July 26, 2002	Chidori invites a person in his house called Kareem. He has arrived with his Kintarō-type Medabot Kintaro. Ikki and Metabee learn from Kareem that they were training on Mt. Cidar when they were attacked by an elusive Medabot. Erika does the referee work for the Robattle between Metabee and Kintaro since its not an official Robattle causing Mr. Referee to sadly leave. After the Robattle, Ikki and Erika take Kareem and Kintaro in looking for Medabots that matched their description. The first candidate is the rabbit-type Medabot Rabudo as Kareem says that its not the Medabot they encountered. They glimpse from around the corner at the unicorn-type Medabot Acehorn as Kareem states that its not the Medabot. When a runaway baby carriage is seen, the baby is saved by Rokusho who Kareem identifies as their attacker. Rokusho admits that he attacked them out of the fact that they were leaving a lot of forest animals without homes. Kareem then challenges Rokusho to a Robattle as Mr. Referee arrives. Rokusho declines causing Mr. Referee to sadly take his leave again. Kintaro lunges towards Rokusho and is defeated by the tree he sliced down in the attack. Robattle stats: Rokusho stops Kintaro.
"There's Something About Miss Mimosa"	16	35	October 15, 1999	August 2, 2002	Ikki and Metabee visit the florist shop run my Mr. Richards and his flower-type Medabot Floro. The music teacher Miss Mimosa arrives as Mr. Richards is smitten with her. When Ikki mentions this to her, Erika mentions that Coach Mountain also has a crush on Miss Mimosa. They soon discover that Squidguts also has a crush on her. As Mr. Richards, Coach Mountain, and Squidguts compete for Miss Mimosa's affection, Floro makes off with her. As Metabee caves in to Floro's demands upon not wanting to harm Miss Mimosa, Mr. Richards manages to knock Floro down as Metabee restrains him. Floro apologizes for his actions. Robattle stats: Mr. Richards stops Floro.
"Phantom Renegade: Unmasked"	17	11	October 22, 1999	November 10, 2001	During one of his heists, the Phantom Renegade is confronted by persistent newspaper reporter Seamus MacRaker of the National Intruder and his chameleon-type Medabot Multikolor. After avoiding them and a brief encounter with Rokusho, Phantom Renegade escapes in his balloon where he hits himself on the forehead during the escape colliding with the bridge steel beams and loses his mask. With Ikki having a head injury upon exhaustedly slipping in the bathroom last night, Seamus assumes that Ikki is the Phantom Renegade. He does everything he can to prove that Ikki is the Phantom Renegade. This reaches a breaking point where Ikki ends up in a Robattle with Seamus as Multikolor uses his camouflage. Using Dr. Bokchoy's right arm, Metabee was able to find Multikolor and defeat him. The Phantom Renegade gets his mask back and flees the area while hitting his head on a tree branch. This was enough to exonerate Ikki of the accusations. Having read that news, Seamus and Multikolor plan to get the Phantom Renegade next time. Robattle stats: Metabee acquires Multikolor's left arm.
"Ban All Medabots"	18	12	October 29, 1999	November 17, 2001	As the Rubberobo Gang are riding around dressed as a rebellious rock and roll band with their platformed being pulled around by two car-type Medabots called the Landmotors. Their actions end up wrecking the groceries of Mrs. Pimpley of the PTA. She starts to enlist the rest of the PTA in inciting a ban on Medabots on school property as they managed to capture Brass, Peppercat, Cyandog, and Totalizer while Metabee and Samurai get away. This caused some students to protest as the PTA meets with the Principal and his staff as Coach Mountain even talks about how he used to hate Medabots. The PTA start taking matters into their own hands as they confiscate every Medabot found on the property. It even gets worse when they cause trouble for Henry outside of the Hop Mart. Erika's protest is seen by Rokusho. With Samurai's help, Ikki and Erika free the captive Medabots while Metabee provides a diversion. The protests escalates when the students plan to go on strike from school. The Rubberobo Gang then show up to cause trouble at Riverview Junior High. The PTA retaliates only to be attacked by the Landmotors and the Noctobats. The students come to the PTA's defense as a large Robattle ensues. The Principal explains that there is good between a relationship between a Medabot and their Medafighter. As most of the Noctobats are defeated, Cyandog and Totalizer are taken out. Rokusho shows up to break up the Robattle which he considers madness as many Medabots will suffer unnecessary damage. He suggests that both sides choose a representative to fight for them. Seaslug chooses his Landmotors while Ikki and the Principal face off against them. Despite the Landmotors' crash attacks, Metabee and Samurai defeat them. Mrs. Pimply then scolds Seaslug for her ruined groceries. The rest of the PTA hear that this was all because of what happened to Mrs. Pimply's groceries as they chase after her leaving the Rubberobo Gang in a state of despair. Robattle stats: Metabee and Samurai acquire the Landmotors' right arms.
"The Birds and the Metabees"	19	36	November 5, 1999	August 9, 2002	Ikki, Metabee, and Erika visit the new zoo that has opened. They discover that all the animals are actually penguins in disguise. A boy named Paco and his penguin-type Medabot Pingen try to cool the penguins down with water only to be thrown out by two familiar zookeepers. This causes Ikki and Erika to become suspicious. Later that night, it is revealed that the zoo staff is actually the Rubberobo Gang in disguise who are using their zoo operation to fund their plans to conquer the world. The next day, Ikki, Metabee, and Erika find that the zoo is now a monster zoo. Like the last time, all the monsters are penguins in disguise as they see a show where a disguised Gillgirl tries to get the penguins to jump through the hoop. When the kids and Metabee voice their dismay for animal cruelty, they are thrown out. Once outside, they meet Paco and Pingen who are in the company of Karin as they secretly take care of the penguins through the bars. After an encounter with Rokusho, Ikki formulates a plan to get the penguins out of the zoo when they recognize Squidguts. Later that night, Ikki's group and Paco managed to liberate the penguins with the Rubberobo Gang in pursuit. While Shrimplips is left to pay the taxicab driver, the others catch up to the kids at the boat bound for Antarctica and Seaslug unleashes the marine-type Medabot Aquamar on them. Metabee defeats Aquamar while Rokusho buys the kids time to get Pingen and the penguins on the boat. Robattle stats: Metabee acquires Aquamar's legs.
"Meet Your Meda-Maker"	20	13	November 12, 1999	November 24, 2001	After a failed dine and ditch by the Rubberobo Gang that caused them to do dishes, Shrimplips secretly does a transmission. Moments later, Seaslug, Gillgirl, Squidguts, and Shrimplips return to their headquarters to find more Rubberobo Gang members present. They are contacted by the Rubberobo Gang's true leader who instructs them to search for the Rare Medals. After besting Spike and Cyandog, Ikki and Metabee are approached by a stranger as they flee from him. Upon finding him in their house thanks to Spike, Ikki and Metabee learn that he is Dr. Aki who invented the Medabots as Koji also arrives. With Karin revealed to be his granddaughter, Aki offers to train Ikki and Metabee. He starts by controlling Cyandog and besting Metabee in an unofficial Robattle. Then he has Ikki and Koji help out with chores around the house and handling his groceries, while Aki encounters Rokusho. Just then, Shrimplips and Gillgirl attack with spider-type Medabot Spidar as they make off with Neutranurse as Koji's fear of spiders is known. Ikki, Metabee, and Aki follow them to a factory. As Shrimplips holds up Neutranurse's medal to the sky, their leader speaks through the clouds and scans the medal declaring it not a Rare Medal. A Robattle occurs where Spidar traps Metabee in its web. Because Gillgirl left Spidar's Robattle parts back at their lair as she did not think that they would be in a Robattle, Metabee breaks free and defeats Spidar. Aki is left wondering what the Rubberobo Gang want with the Rare Medals. Robattle stats: Metabee loses to Cyandog and later acquires Spidar's right arm.
"The Spy Who Robattled Me"	21	14	November 19, 1999	December 1, 2001	Ikki and Metabee receive an invitation from Karin as Erika gets jealous. When she arrives with Dr. Aki, Erika finds out that Karin is related to Aki. He takes them on a trip to the Medabot Corporation. Meanwhile, Seaslug has infiltrated the Medabot Corporation as Mr. Tunahead and gets smitten by a worker named Miss Caviar. In one room, Aki shows how tank-type Medabots called Tankar (Note: The English dub of the Medabot Vital Stats lists Tankar as a battle motor-type Medabot.) face off against the new devil-type Medabot Belzelga who is listed in the vital status to be owned by Miss Caviar. After misunderstanding Miss Caviar's interactions, Seaslug steals Belzelga as word about what "Mr. Tunahead" has done is spread throughout the Medabot Corporation. Heading to the roof, Seaslug holds Belzelga's medal up to the sky as the scan from the Rubberobo Gang's leader states that it is not a Rare Medal. With Mr. Referee delayed by the security guards, Metabee, Brass, and Neutranurse have a fierce fight with Belzelga. The three Medabots managed to defeat Belzelga by causing it to fall off the building as Mr. Referee declares their victory. Seaslug escapes in the helicopter piloted by the Rubberobo Gang members unaware the Miss Caviar still has feelings for her. Aki later meets with the Phantom Renegade about protecting the Rare Medals. Robattle stats: Metabee defeats Belzelga with help from Brass and Neutranurse.
"Skyward, Yo!"	22	37	November 26, 1999	August 16, 2002	As Ikki and Metabee are walking, they are ambushed by the Phantom Renegade who is chased off by Rokusho. The next day, Dr. Aki introduces Ikki, Metabee, and Erika to his airplane pilot friend Kailey and her plane-type Medabot Femjet. Because of an accident in the last airshow, Femjet has developed a fear of flying. Ikki improvises some parts in order face off against Femjet. This does not go well as Metabee defeats himself. Before Kailey can board her biplane, the Rubberobo Gang pops out of it where they assume that Femjet wins by luck and steal Femjet and her medal before escaping into their flying vehicle pulled by some Noctobats. To help save Femjet, Aki lends Ikki a flying part to go after the Rubberobo Gang while the others follow in Kailey's biplane. After being told by their leader that Femjet's medal is not a Rare Medal, Seaslug unleashes the dragonfly-type Medabot Drakonfly on Ikki and Metabee. With Ikki and Metabee shot down and falling with Femjet's body and the Rubberobo Gang's vehicle destroyed, the Phantom Renegade on a hang glider offers to save Ikki and Metabee if they give up Metabee's medal. Ikki declines to give up the medal and the Phantom Renegade states that he will see them at the bottom. Putting Femjet's medal back into Femjet, Ikki and Metabee were able to get her to overcome her fear of flying and help them to defeat Drakonfly. Later that night during the airshow, Metabee gets annoyed that Ikki wants him in those improvised flying parts again. Robattle stats: Metabee acquires Drakonfly's right arm.
"I Dream of Hushi"	23	15	December 3, 1999	December 8, 2001	Rokusho has a dream about a man named Hushi. He is woken up from his sleep in a tree owned by a lone woman named Ainsley and is seen off the property by her fairy-type Medabot Botafly. (Note: The English dub of the Medabot Vital Stats lists Botafly as a fly-type Medabot.) Rokusho gets drawn to the tree again as there is another intruder nearby. Ikki and Metabee later come across the property at the time when Ainsley shows Rokusho her husband's Rare Medals. They fall out of the tree giving themselves away to Rokusho. He tells them about his past with Hushi who developed the Medabot theory. Later that night, Ainsley's property is raided by Seaslug and Gillgirl who are looking for the Rare Medals. Rokusho comes to their defense as Seaslug unleashes the salamander-type Medabot Saldron. With Saldron's flames heading towards the tree which also brought up the flames in his dream, Rokusho snaps out of this phase with Ainsley's help and sends Seaslug, Gillgirl, and Saldron flying away. With the tree destroyed, the box that was underneath it contained a photo of Ainsley with her husband. Robattle stats: Rokusho defeats Saldron.
"Dance with the Mantis"	24	29	December 10, 1999	July 3, 2002	Rosewood Private School is putting on its annual costume party. Koji has been having a nightmare where Ikki has won Karin over. He plans to perfect an event that would win Karin to her side. The Screws hear of the party and plan to sneak in. When it comes to them sneaking into Rosewood Private School, the Rubberobo Gang try a disguise which does not fool the guard until he mistakes their Rubberobo outfits as actual costumes. When it comes to the party, Koji has his steward Robinson shine the light on Karin to profess her love to her. He slips and the light his Samantha. This causes Koji to run from her. The Rubberobo Gang crash the party demanding the Rare Medals. Though Koji prepares to Robattle them, he starts to freak out when they bring out the mantis-type Medabot Mantaprey. This causes problems for Koji and Sumilodon. Robinson informs the kids about an incident where Koji had collected a mantis nest that ended up hatching in his closet which started his fear of insect and arachnids. Koji is only calmed down when Karin states that she and her grandfather are leaving. Mr. Referee declares the Robattle a draw as the Rubberobo Gang enjoy the food. As Koji regrets not telling Karin his feeling for herm, Robinson consoles him Robattle stats: Sumilodon does not complete the Robattle because of Koji's freak-out.
"Metabee Vs Rokusho"	25	16	December 17, 1999	February 9, 2002	As the Rubberobo Gang catch a young Medafighter to steal his medal, he is saved by Rokusho who throws snowballs at them. Upon being informed of what happened, the Rubberobo Gang's leader recognizes Rokusho and that he has a Rare Medal. After besting the Screws in a Robattle, Ikki and Metabee join Rokusho in rescuing Karin from the Rubberobo Gang. Afterwards, Karin reveals that the box she is carrying has a robotic parrot inside that Rokusho recognizes as Barton who was owned by Professor Hushi. When Barton is taken to Dr. Aki to be repaired, there is a brief disruption by the Rubberobo Gang. Rokusho repairs Barton who passes out before revealing what happened the day when Hushi's house was set on fire. Aki comes in with an axe as Rokusho thinks that Aki is going to attack him. The Phantom Renegade shows up to hold off Rokusho as Karin is advised to leave. The resulting fight starts a fire. Ikki and Metabee arrive at the burning building. Metabee faces off against Rokusho. To everyone's surprise, Rokusho glows and blasts Metabee with the Medaforce. As Rokusho collapses, another threat appears in the flames.
"Use the Medaforce" (a.k.a. "Discovery of Medaforce")	26	17	December 24, 1999	February 16, 2002	Continuing from the last episode, the Rubberobo Gang has arrived with a prototype of the weapon-type Medabot Robo-Emperor who defeats the exhausted Rokusho. As the Rubberobo Gang make off with Rokusho, Ikki was able to evacuate Metabee as Dr. Aki's house burns down. At the Medabot Corporation, Aki explains what he knows. While his body is being repaired, Metabee is using a spare body that is utilizing Mistyghost's head, Landmotor's right arm, Foxuno's left arm, and Banisher's legs. Aki mentions about Professor Hushi's work and how they found remarkable power in the medals. Miss Caviar reveals that they fixed Barton and Aki finds evidence that someone tampered with Barton. Meanwhile, the Rubberobo Gang are having a hard time getting the Rare Medal out of Rokusho. The Phantom Renegade rescues Rokusho as they are pursued by the Rubberobo Gang and Robo-Emperor. With Metabee repaired and getting some information from the chick salesman, Ikki and Metabee find where the Phantom Renegade and Rokusho are as they come to their defense. When Metabee ends up severely damaged by Robo-Emperor's attacks, he suddenly taps into the Medaforce and defeats Robo-Emperor as the picture on Metabee's medal changes from a larva to a grown Hercules beetle. After being repaired, Rokusho leaves with Barton to find Hushi as he might still be alive. Meanwhile, the Rubberobo Gang are analyzing the medal used on Robo-Emperor as they prepare work on another Medabot that will get the Rare Medals for them. Robattle stats: Metabee uses the Medaforce to defeat Robo-Emperor.
"Fifteen Minutes of Shame"	27	18	January 7, 2000	February 23, 2002	Mr. Referee announces the current rankings of Japan according to the World Medabot Federation. After two months, the top 3 will represent Japan in the World Robattle Championship. Erika tells Ikki that he is ranked #3, Koji is ranked #2, and someone named Space Medafighter X is ranked #1. Dr. Aki is told about the Medaforce by Ikki while lingering at the Hop Mart. Ikki later finds that there are reporters at his house wanting to interview them. He tries to show Metabee using the Medaforce on Peppercat which does not go well. After Ikki's talk with Aki with Metabee currently using Aquamar's legs, Henry learns that Aki is going to linger until his house is repaired. Amidst the many duels with Spike and Cyandog, Samantha is told by Mr. Referee that they must receive points from an unfamiliar opponent as her duel with Ikki and the many duels with Cyandog do not count. Samantha and Peppercat later encounter Mr. Dragon and his dragon-type Medabot Spitfire and are defeated by him. Mr. Dragon then proceeds to challenge Ikki and Metabee to a Robattle. While Aquamar's legs come in handy near the river, Metabee contends with Spitfire's regeneration ability. Due to the regeneration ability being in Spitfire's head, Metabee attacks it enough to defeat Spitfire. Mr. Dragon warns Ikki that a lot of Medafighters will want to claim his #3 spot. Robattle stats: Metabee acquires Spitfire's left arm.
"Love at First Bite"	28	38	January 14, 2000	August 23, 2002	Ikki and Metabee come across an octopus balls cart run by a girl named Natalie and her Octoclam who has the arms of Redmatador and Crow Tengu (Note: It is because of Octoclam's use of Crow Tengu's left arm that the English dub of the Medabot Vital Stats lists his specialty as wind attack.) come in handy when preparing the octopus balls. Natalie tries to impress Ikki by declaring her love for him and go to the World Robattle Championship so that she can advertise her father's restaurant. She wants to Robattle Ikki and Metabee with the prize being Ikki's marriage. When the Robattle happens, Natalie has Octoclam use his wind attack to send the octopus balls towards Ikki. Metabee manages to defeat Octoclam, but Natalie finally managed to make the perfect octopus balls. While she stops trying to win Ikki's affection, she does develop an attraction to the same passerby from "For Love or Robattle". As the events of this episode happen, four mysterious Medabots watch everything and commentate on it. Robattle stats: Metabee acquires Octoclam's legs.
"Once Frostbitten, Twice Shy"	29	30	January 21, 2000	July 4, 2002	Snow has fallen overnight and Metabee is pleased. The Principal declares a snow day, but Ikki, Erika, and the Screws did not get word of it. Neither has Coach Mountain as he needs to induce exercise on anyone. The kids find the school empty and after entering the building, they find the gates are locked. As the Screws eat the food in the teacher's lounge and make use of the heater, Ikki, Metabee, and Erika traverse the school. Thanks to Coach Mountain's searching amidst the worsening snowstorm, Ikki, Metabee, and Erika fall into the snow-covered gym where they encounter a boy named Tom and his snowman-type Medabot Snowbro (Note: The English dub of the Medabot Vital Stats lists Snowbro as a snowball-type Medabot.) which is responsible for the snowstorm. Ikki and Metabee have a Robattle with Tom and Snowbro. The freeze beam from Snowbro causes trouble for Metabee. Just then, Coach Mountain falls through the roof as his body heat thaws out Metabee. Causing an avalanche, Metabee causes Snowbro to surrender. The snowstorm ends as Ikki, Metabee, and Erika part ways with Tom. Coach Mountain makes the Screws do exercise for eating all of his snacks. Robattle stats: Metabee defeats Snowbro.
"Heavy Medal"	30	39	January 28, 2000	August 30, 2002	Ikki, Metabee, and Salty find an injured Spyke who explains that Cyandog has run away from home. Ikki and Erika help to find Cyandog before Samantha finds out and kicks Spike out of the Screws. This does not work as Samantha found out and shows Spike's ranking as last place. Unless he can get a victory, Spike will be kicked out of the Screws. Erika was able to find Cyandog with the Rockers who have restructured themselves as a heavy metal band with the Metalheads alias. Cyandog has taken the name of C-Dawg and claims to not know Spike causing Spike to run off. Though Metabee convinces Cyandog to return, it does not work as a badly-affected Spike was resulted in buying the dog-type Medabot Krosserdog with a plan to get the Kabuto Medal this time. This results in Cyandog returning to the Rockers after an encounter with the chick salesman. After Cyandog and the Rockers best a kid's rat-type Medabot Jorat, Metabee takes action and starts to best Cyandog. Spike arrives to explain everything to Cyandog. When Cyandog is defeated, the Monkey Medal ejects. Now Ikki wants the associated Medawatch back as he faces off against the Rockers' Blackram and Phoenix. Metabee uses the Medaforce to defeat them. Just then, one of the four mysterious Medabots shows up and attacks Metabee. Mr. Referee declares this as a penalty as he gets frightened by the Medabot's sword. Spike places the Monkey Medal into Krosserdog to provide cover fire as the other three mysterious Medabots show up. Robattle stats: Metabee acquires Cyandog's lef arm and Blackram's right arm.
"Enter Rintaro"	31	19	February 4, 2000	March 2, 2002	Following the incident, Spike is getting the Monkey Medal adjusted to Krosserdog's body when they see a mysterious Medabot on the sign before getting struck by lightning. At the Hop Mart, Ikki and Erika are at the Hop Mart showing the pictures of the four Medabots to Dr. Aki as he claims that they weren't made by the Medabot Corporation. When Ikki and Metabee find Spike unconscious on the ground, they are confronted by Samantha who claims that Peppercat has been attacked by Metabee with similar attacks being done to the Principal's Samurai and Coach Mountain's Digmole. Ikki and Metabee have no knowledge of the attacks as it is stated that Metabee is the only KTB Medabot in Riverview City. This causes Ikki and Metabee to hide from Samantha and other angry Medafighters. At the Rubberobo Gang's headquarters, the four mysterious Medabots are revealed to have been created by the Rubberobo Gang's leader and gifted to its members. Seaslug has the Shinsengumi-type Medabot Whitesword (Note: The English dub for the Medabot Vital Stats lists Whitesword as a samurai-type Medabot) who attacked Metabee in the last episode, Gillgirl has the Chinese dragon-type Medabot Seagaru, (Note: The English dub for the Medabot Vital Stats lists Seagaru as a dragon-type Medabot.) Squidguts has the Benkei-type Medabot Gobanko, (Note: The English dub for the Medabot Vital Stats lists Gobanko as a samurai-type Medabot.) and Shrimplips has the Sun Wukong-type Medabot Gokudo. (Note: The English dub of the Medabot Vital Stats lists Gokudo as a Gokudo-type Medabot) Shrimplips is made the field leader of the Rubberobo Gang. Meanwhile, Koji meets a boy named Rintaro Namashima who is looking for Ikki. Koji meeting with Rintaro attracts Ikki and Metabee when he is brought to the Hop Mart as they find that Rintaro owns the Hercules beetle-type Medabot Kantaroth who almost resembles Metabee. Ikki, Koji, and Rintaro are then attacked by Shrimplips in his true identity of Shrimpy Lippowitz and Gokudo who are aided by the Sha Wujing-type Medabot Sir Gold and the Zhu Bajie-type Medabot Hakado. Its because of the lack of cooperation that enables Shrimplips to score victory. When the Screws arrive with Samantha confused on how Spike survived a lightning bolt, he sees the Medabot he saw earlier when with Krosserdog.
"The Ace from Outer Space"	32	20	February 11, 2000	March 9, 2002	Continuing from the last episode, the Medabot is identified as the Hercules beetle-type Medabot Arcbeetle. It is owned by Space Medafighter X who wears a golden version of the Phantom Renegade's mask. Arcbeetle manages to defeat Shrimpy Lippowitz' Medabots causing him to retreat. Space Medafighter X returns Metabee's medal to him and reprimands Ikki for accepting Shrimplips' challenge. Mr. Referee mentions that this Robattle counts as a new one because of Shrimplips' true identity. Because of what happened, Ikki has been bumped to the #4 position. The Rubberobo Gang's leader hears of what happens and gives Shrimplips one more chance to prove himself. Ikki, Rintaro, and Koji go to a dojo that Rintaro found to undergo some training. Erika finds the real dojo master bound and gag. They expose the dojo master who is actually Gokudo and Shrimpy with Sumilodon and Kantaroth being defeated and having their medals taken. This time, Ikki and Metabee are able to defeat Gokudo, Sir Gold, and Hakado with the Medaforce. After Shrimpy gets away upon releasing Sumilodon and Kantaroth's medals, Space Medafighter X congratulates Ikki for his victory. Robattle stats: Metabee acquires Gokudo's right arm.
"Bridge Over Troubled Squidguts" (a.k.a. "Robattle Bridge")	33	31	February 18, 2000	July 5, 2002	Koji asks Dr. Aki to teach him how to use the Medaforce. He is told that he cannot perform it unless he has a Rare Medal. Koji is approached by Space Medafighter X who tells him that there is a way to beat the Medaforce. Meanwhile, the Rubberobo Gang's leader removes Shrimplips from the leadship position. Denying Seaslug a turn, the Rubberobo Gang's leader appoints Squidguts to the position. Still at #4, Ikki tries to find somebody new to Robattle with where nobody wants the opportunity. Squidguts takes Gobanko to a pedestrian bridge where anyone that wants to cross it must Robattle and give up their medals if they lose. Gobanko manages to defeat the Student Council President's Dr. Bokchoy and Coach Mountain's Digmole. Karin comes up with a solution by having a crosswalk installed. This does not bode well for Squidguts causing Karin to have a racing event take part over the street. Ikki and Erika stumble upon the event. Squidguts challenges Ikki to a Robattle under his alias of Guido Guttaluchi. Noticing a damage in a bridge, Metabee uses this opportunity to defeat Gobanko. Rintaro shows up informing Ikki on what Koji is doing with Space Medafighter X. Robattle stats: Metabee acquires Gobanko's left arm.
"Me and My Shadow Sword"	34	21	February 25, 2000	March 30, 2002	In light of what Rintaro told him, Ikki heads to Koji's home to see if he is training with Space Medafighter X. Koji states to Ikki that when he has mastered the new technique, he will Robattle Ikki and Metabee as Ikki gets a hint on what he will expect in that Robattle from Space Medafighter X. Rintaro annoys Space Medafighter X by calling him Henry while denying that Space Medafighter X is the same Henry that Ikki knows. Karin works to support Koji. When it comes time for the Robattle, Ikki has Metabee equipped with Multikolor's arm that is hidden underneath the cape that Metabee wears which was previously worn by Rokusho. When Metabee pretends to power up for the Medaforce, Koji has Sumilodon unsheath the Shadow Sword. The Multikolor arm comes in handy as Metabee defeats Sumilodon. Space Medafighter X compliments Ikki and Koji while cautioning them that there will be tougher opponents in the World Robattle Cup. Salty shows up with a message for Ikki informing him that Chidori has been taken by the Rubberobo Gang. Robattle stats: Metabee acquires Sumilodon's right arm.
"Dude, Where's My Ma?"	35	22	March 3, 2000	April 6, 2002	Returning home, Ikki and Metabee find that their mother is not there confirming that the Rubberobo Gang have her. After a brief call to his father, Ikki is told of a note that Karin found that is telling him to come to the Rubberobo Gang's hideout as Koji tells him that this is the last day for him to regain the #3 position at the World Robattle Cup. At the Rubberobo Gang's hideout, Chidori has tended to some of the Rubberobo Gang members by patching up their suits and serving them food. Jouzou works to return home. Ikki arrives at the Rubberobo Gang's cave as Seaslug states that he will have to fight his way passed each of them to get to his mother. Gillgirl goes first in her true identity of Gilda Girlnikova. She unleashes Seagaru and the tiger-type Medabot Spiritus on Metabee. When Seagaru and Spiritus start to cause problems for Metabee, he tricks them into attacking each other as Metabee defeats them earning Ikki some points for the qualification. Squidguts and Shrimplips then assume their true identities and unleash Gobanko and Gokudo on Metabee. As Metabee uses the Medaforce on Gobanko and Gokudo, he and Ikki know that they already defeated their Medafighters in their true identity. Seaslug unleashes the Noctobats who are all defeated when Space Medafighter X and Arcbeetle arrive. With 30 minutes left for the qualification, Ikki has no other choice but to Robattle Space Medafighter X. Robattle stats: Metabee acquires Seagaru's right arm and Gokudo's left arm.
"X-treme Measures"	36	23	March 10, 2000	April 13, 2002	Because of the deadline, Ikki and Metabee go up against Space Medafighter X as Erika begs Space Medafighter X to do a handicap battle because of Metabee's fights against Seagaru, Spiritus, Gobanko, and Gokudo to no avail. The Screws arrive as everyone helps Metabee out. Spike donates Krosserdog's left arm, Rintaro donates Kantaroth's right arm, and Koji donates Sumilodon's legs. As the Robattle commences, Metabee has a fierce fight with Arcbeetle. Watching from afar, the Rubberobo Gang wonder what would happen if Ikki beat Space Medafighteer X. With failure not an option, Seaslug unleashes Whitesword to crash the Robattle and steal Ikki's Medawatch. As Whitesword crashes the Robattle, Space Medafighter X jumps in front of the attack. Mr. Referee catches Whitesword in the act and Seaslug challenges Ikki under his true identity of Seymour Slugbottoms. Enraged at this action, Metabee uses the Medaforce to defeat Whitesword. When everyone checks on Space Medafighter X, his mask breaks revealing the mask of the Phantom Renegade who states that he targeted Metabee's Rare Medal to protect it from being used for evil purposes. Just then, a helicopter arrives and unleashes the weapon-type Medabot Mega-Emperor as it attacks everything in sight. As Mega-Emperor is too powerful for anyone to face, the Phantom Renegade and Arcbeetle engage it as the Phantom Renegade plans to eject the medal. Before all three of them fall into the ocean afterwards, the Phantom Renegade asks Ikki to protect Metabee's medal. Just then, the assorted Rubberobo Gang members swarm over Ikki and Metabee. Robattle stats: Metabee vs. Arcbeetle was unfinished. Medabee defeats Whitesword with the Medaforce.
"The Road to Ruins" (a.k.a. "Raiders of the Lost Medabot")	37	24	March 17, 2000	April 20, 2002	The assorted Rubberobo Gang members capture Metabee and escape in the same helicopter that unleashed Mega-Emperor. With Seaslug, Gillgirl, Squidguts, and Shrimplips left behind, Ikki interrogates them on where Metabee was taken. A captured Shrimplips directs Ikki and Koji to the Miyami Ruins. Upon entering and finding images of the different medals in the ruins, Ikki and Koji are confronted by the assorted Rubberobo Gang members. Erika, Karin, and the Screws show up to help. With each of them falling into a trap, Ikki and Shrimplips rescued by Seaslug, Gillgirl, and Squidguts who want Ikki to avenge their abandonment. As they arrive at the area that Seaslug pointed out, Ikki, Koji, and Samantha are confronted by three Rubberobo Gang members who are controlling three Belzelgas. While Sumilodon and Peppercat are weakened by the Belzelgas, Rokusho shows up. Robattle stats: Peppercat's fight with the three Belzelgas was unfinished.
"Beetle Mania"	38	25	March 24, 2000	April 27, 2002	Continuing from the last episode, Rokusho defeats the three Rubberobo Gang members and their Belzelgas. While unaware that Metabee was captured, Rokusho states that he is here to stop the Rubberobo Gang's plot and reveals what he learned from his search for Professor Hushi and sent Barton to mention the same thing to Dr. Aki. This information involved the medals being created by an ancient civilization that existed before humankind did. This information was also discovered by the Rubberobo Gang's leader. Miss Caviar informs Aki about a strong transmission coming from the Miyami Ruins and the use of the Terakado satellites that are broadcasting the transmission across the world. The transmission is coming from the pulses done to the Hercules Beetle Medal that is affecting the clone medals as the transmission causes Brass, Kantaroth, and the Medabot Corporation's Tankars to go on a rampage causing Aki to postulate that someone is trying to recreate a terrible event that occurred eight years ago. The Rubberobo Gang's leader gives a transmission revealing his motive and will give the world leaders 30 minutes to decide to surrender the world to him or else humanity will be wiped out. As Ikki and his allies arrive in the lair, they learn that the Rubberobo Gang's leader is Dr. Meta-Evil who used to work with Hushi. When Rokusho learns that he was the one who burned down Hushi's house, he attacks only to be attacked by the missiles shot by Robo-Emperor's right Bombarder as Koji suspects that Meta-Evil is a human/Medabot hybrid as Meta-Evil keeps changing his arms like using Stingray's right arm, Spidar's left arm, Phoenix's left arm, and Megaphant's left shield arm as well as flying with Phoenix's leg part. Ikki loans Churleybear's arm to Sumilodon who uses the gravity attack to send Meta-Evil flying. As Ikki works to free Metabee, Rokusho, Sumilodon, and Peppercat try hold off Meta-Evil. Meanwhile, Kantaroth has cornered Rintaro, Spike, and Sloan and Rintaro does the right thing by punching Kantaroth in the face after a pep talk from the chick salesman who is now selling rabbits. As Ikki frees Metabee, Meta-Evil defeats Rokusho, Sumilodon, and Peppercat. With the Phantom Renegade and Arcbeetle showing up to help, Ikki finally gets through to Metabee as the light from the Medaforce damages the room and traps Meta-Evil under some rubble. This causes all the rampaging Medabots to stop attacking. Meta-Evil's cat appears and states that its purpose is done. It ejects the medal that is running Meta-Evil, who is revealed to be a Medabot clone. Grabbing the medal, the Cat runs off and places it into the back of Giganko (a giant-sized version of Mega-Emperor) as it begins to activate. Robattle stats: Dr. Meta-Evil Vs. Peppercat, Sumilodon, and Rokusho....Interrupted by the Cat.
"The Mother of All Robattles"	39	26	March 31, 2000	April 27, 2002	With Giganko activated in the last episode, it goes on the attack. Jouzou leaves his shelter telling Chidori that he has something to do. Metabee, Rokusho, and Arcbeetle work to fight Giganko. Each one taps into the Medaforce to attack Giganko who ends up having a backup pair of legs when its first legs were damaged. As the area around it devastated, Giganko moves towards the Medabot Corporation. After a talk with the chick salesman, Ikki uses a flying Medapart on Metabee as they follow it while thinking of a plan on how to defeat Giganko. The Select Corps arrive with the Pteranodon-type Medabots Air-Ptera, the Tyrannosaurus-type Medabots Attack-Tyrano, and the Brachiosaurus-type Medabots Landbrachio to slow Giganko's advances to no avail. Ikki and Metabee get onto Giganko and have no choice but to dislodge the medal. They managed to repel the cat and dislodge the medal which shuts down Giganko. While Mr. Referee declares that action a foul, Ikki and Metabee shout at him stating that they just saved Japan. They accidentally fall off and are rescued by the Air-Ptera. Meeting with a disguised Jouzou, Ikki and Metabee learned that the Rubberobo Gang members involved have been arrested. Analyzing the medal that was ejected from Giganko, Dr. Aki figured out how Dr. Meta-Evil created the medals that was different than how Aki had cloned them. Rokusho agrees to help Aki prepare for when the real Meta-Evil appears and begins his next plot for world domination. The next day, Ikki and Metabee are by the river pleased that they saved the world while musing over missing the deadline and that they can try again next time. Erika and Rintaro arrive telling Ikki that the press are at his house. Upon arrival, Ikki and Metabee learn from the reporters that they have regained the #3 rank and are going to the World Robattle Cup which confuses Ikki and Metabee. Mr. Referee explains that Ikki and Metabee's victory over Seymour Slugbottoms' Whitesword was considered valid enough for them to qualify for the World Robattle Cup. Henry plans to give Ikki a discount on any Medaparts that he will need for the upcoming event. Robattle stats: Ikki and Metabee defeat Giganko and save the world.

==== Episodes 40-52 ====
Title	Ep. #	Original Airdate	English Airdate	Synopsis
"Let the Meda-Games Begin"	40	April 7, 2000	September 14, 2002	One week before the World Robattle Cup begins, Mr. Referee is being made the main referee for the tournament by the World Medabot Federation. The committee members tell him that there will be a new rule added to this year's World Robattle Cup. Preparations have been completed at the Medadome in Medaropolis as Medafighters from all over the world are gathering at the Players Village like Team Mexico, Team Siberia, and Team Kenya. Ikki and Metabee have their encounter with Victor of Team Kenya. At the Hop Mart, Ikki, Erika, and Koji worry that Space Medafighter X will not show up after it was revealed that he was the Phantom Renegade. Later that night, Karin gets a call from a mysterious person. The next day, the World Robattle Cup begins as Mr. Referee reveals that there will be a teamed exhibition match between Team Japan and Team Kenya. He reveals the new rule where the losing team must give up their medals. Karin shows up as Space Medafighter X as she, Neutranurse, Ikki, Metabee, Koji, and Sumilodon confront Team Kenya consisting of Victor and Warbandit, Isbestja and rhinoceros-type Medabot Rhinorush, and Prauda and his gorilla-type Medabot Goriongo. Warbandit volunteers to fight on Team Kenya's behalf. During the exhibition match, Warbandit manages to overwhelm Metabee, Sumilodon, and Neutranurse until time runs out. When Victor states that Team Japan will not be lucky against Team Kenya if they face off again, Ikki states that they'll beat them next time.
"Pixies and Pirates"	41	April 14, 2000	September 15, 2002	Ikki, Erika, and Karin encounter a girl named Coconut who claims that she stole chocolate from Captain Gene of Team Caribbean. Captain Gene shows up with his mates seeking restitution. Despite Karin's attempt to do a reparation, Captain Gene unleashes his pirate captain-type Medabot Piraskull and his mates unleash their pirate henchmen-type Medabots Pirastar. Metabee manages to repel Team Caribbean. After thanking Team Japan and watching them train, Coconut leaves quietly commenting that Team Japan is going down. When it comes to the match between Team Japan and Team Caribbean, Ikki, Koji, and Karin's Space Medafighter X form discover that Coconut is Captain Gene's daughter. Having had Piraskull and the Pirastar fake their weaknesses, Team Caribbean takes advantage of Ikki and Koji' lack of teamwork. They did not count on Karin and Neutranurse as Karin tells Ikki and Koji to work together. Metabee was able to use the Medaforce to defeat Piraskull and the Piratstar enabling Team Japan to score victory over Team Caribbean. Coconut prepares to give her medal to Team Japan who forgives her while declining.
"The French Deception"	42	April 21, 2000	September 21, 2002	Team Kenya has defeated Team Greece (Note: The team was actually called Team Brazil in the original Japanese version.) and their Valkyrie-type Medabots Pretty Prime. On the morning when Team Japan is about to face off against Team France, Ikki and Koji notice that the medals for Metabee and Sumilodon have been stolen. Henry mentions a rumor that the Beret Brothers consisting of Jean-Luc Beret, Jean-Guy Beret, and Jean-Paul Beret are behind the thefts as some of the international teams that were supposed to fight them ended up forfeiting. Jean-Guy Beret overhears the identity of Space Medafighter X. Karin is later confronted by Ikki and Koji only for Neutranuse to be snatched by the Phantom Renegade who exposes Ikki and Koji to be fake. Ikki and Koji are revealed to be Jean-Luc Beret and Jean-Paul Beret who make off with Karin after the Phantom Renegade makes off with Neutranurse. When Ikki and Metabee find Karin, the Beret Brothers trap them in the room. Samantha is recruited to pose as Space Medafighter X this time. She arrives at the match where Jean-Luc Beret brings out thief-type Medabot Monoklar, Jean-Paul Beret brings out Goemon-type Medabot Kamafive, and Jean-Guy Beret brings out revolver-type Medabot Wildfire. Jean-Guy Beret is revealed to be the Phantom Renegade in disguise as the real Jean-Guy Beret shows up tied up just as Ikki and Metabee arrive where the Beret Brothers' plot is exposed. Using the Medaforce, Metabee defeats Team France. After talking with the other referees, Mr. Referee announces that the Beret Brothers have committed a foul enabling Team Japan to win by default. In addition, the Beret Brothers are banned for life from all World Medabot Federation events. Later that evening, Metabee was not fooled by Jean-Luc Beret posing as Ikki and chases after the Beret Brothers with a tied-up Ikki not far behind.
"Space Medaballerina X"	43	April 28, 2000	September 22, 2002	Team Mexico consisting of the Amigo Brothers and their cactus-type Medabots Sabotina has defeated Team Polynesia and their Moai-type Medabots Moai. They will be facing off against Team Japan in the next round as Team Japan witnesses their Sabotina defeating the gangsters from "Running Scared" and their Megaphants. However, Samantha's ballet recital is coming up and that she is not pleased that Spike and Sloan have spread fliers about it around the school. After Samantha is told by the chick salesman to go with her heart, Sloan takes her place as Space Medafighter X. During the match against Team Mexico, Sloan was not prepared as he did not train enough for this. Upon finishing her ballet recital, Samantha arrives and cheers Sloan on giving him the motivation to help Metabee and Sumilodon defeat the Sabotina and score victory for Japan.
"Swede and Sour"	44	May 5, 2000	September 28, 2002	Team Sweden consists of the Stockholm Fire idol group members Anika and her bunny girl-type Medabot Hopstar, Sherry and her sailor-type Medabot Sailormate, and Margarita and her magical girl-type Medabot Fossilkat. They have just defeated Team Spain and their Redmatadors. Ikki is infatuated with them. Meanwhile, Team Kenya has defeated Team Siberia and their Mammoth-type Medabots Mammotusk. Ikki, Koji, and Sloan fall for Stockholm Fire's charm which infuriates Erika, Karin, and Samantha. The girls have a suspicion that Stockholm Fire used some type of charm when they went up against Team Spain even when they enlist Miss Caviar to help form an idol group. Erika gets as close as she can to Stockholm Fire before being thrown out by their bodyguard. When it comes to the match between Team Japan and Team Sweden, Erika exposes to the boys that Stockholm Fire are actually members of the Rubberobo Gang as they change into their Rubberobo Gang outfits as their bodyguard is also a Rubberobo Gang member. During the match, the Phantom Renegade drops some explosives which also revealed that Stockholm Fire are actually males in disguise. This infuriates Ikki and Metabee as Metabee uses his seeker missiles to defeat Hopstar, Sailormate, and Fossilkat enabling Team Japan to win a spot in the fight eight. Victor meets with a mysterious woman.
"Future's Past"	45	May 12, 2000	September 28, 2002	Mr. Referee holds a press conference regarding the final eight matches. Team Japan will be going up against Team Egypt, Team USA will be going up against Team Czech Republic, Team Kenya will be going up against Team Canada, and Team Iceland will be going up against Team England. Patra of Team Egypt claims that Team Japan has a weak link. Koji thinks that the weak link is Spike who is the latest person to pose as Space Medafighter X. His training on Spike and Krosserdog does not go well. In his latest encounter with Patra, Ikki learns of an event called the Ten Days of Darkness that happened years ago. When Ikki asks Henry of it, he gives him a video of the World Robattle Tournament that led to the Ten Days of Darkness. To Ikki's dismay, someone taped over it with a gardening show. Before the match, Patra is visited by Joe Swihan of Team USA as they know each other. During the match between Metabee, Sumilodon, and Krosserdog against Patra's Cleopatra-type Medabot Cleobattler and Al and Hassan's mummy-type Medabots T-Mummy, Spike struggles to help Koji and Ikki. It is during this time that Patra reveals that Koji is the true weakest link. With Koji shocked by this revelation, Krosserdog takes down the T-Mummy while Metabee uses the Medaforce to defeat Cleobattler winning Team Japan the match. When Ikki demands that Patra answers his question about the Ten Days of Darkness, Joe arrives and informs him that the Henry that Patra and Joe know and his Metabee were responsible.
"The Medaforce Within"	46	May 19, 2000	October 5, 2002	Continuing from the last episode, Joe Swihan has mentioned that Henry and his Metabee were responsible as a flashback was seen where Joe, Patra, and her previously owned Egyptian-type Medabot Kingpharaoh witnessed this. Afterwards, Team USA goes into their match against Team Czech Republic consisting of Čapek and his tin toy-type Medabot Mokusei Dai-Oh and his two unnamed teammates who each own retro-type Medabots R-Robby. As Ikki asks Dr. Aki if he has seen Henry around, Aki states that he has not and that the Robo-Emperor that is in his house was stolen by the Rubberobo Gang. Back at the World Robattle Cup, Team USA has come out on top. In the parking lot, Čapek asks Joe for his medal back. He does so only for it to be snatched by the unnamed Rubberobo Gang members. Joe goes after them while having Patra tend to Čapek. As Koji does some training by the seashore, he is confronted by Karin in her Rubberobo Gang alias of Guppy as she brings out Robo-Emperor while claiming that she took Karin hostage using a dummy of her to play the real Karin. Joe arrives and mistakes Karin as an actual Rubberobo Gang member as he and his native-type Medabot Wigwamo attack Karin and Robo-Emperor (who was housing Neutranurse's medal). In the nick of time, Space Medafighter X arrives and saves Karin. Recognizing Space Medafighter X as the Henry he knows, Joe challenges him to a Robattle while blaming him for the Ten Days of Darkness as Space Medafighter X states that he will be at the tournament. When it comes to the match against Team Japan and Team USA, the Select Corps is present to prevent Space Medafighter X from fleeing after the match as Victor and the mysterious woman he interacted with watch the match. Joe, J-Girl, and Glen unleash their Wigwamo against Metabee, Sumilodon, and Arcbeetle where the Wigwamo use their high speed abilities on them. With two of the Wigwamo defeated, Joe's Wigwamo uses its Destroy Mirage move which Joe was saving in the event that he faces off against Victor. Metabee summons the Medaforce to attack it only for Wigwamo to evade it. Though Joe's Wigwamo was caught off guard when Sumilodon summons the Medaforce and scores victory for Team Japan. As the Select Corps prepare to arrest Space Medafighter X for causing the Ten Days of Darkness, Space Medafighter X disappears. Joe plans to learn the truth behind the Ten Days of Darkness someday.
"A Date with Destiny"	47	May 26, 2000	October 6, 2002	In light of Sumilodon summoning the Medaforce to defeat Joe Swihan's Wigwamo, Dr. Aki analyzes Sumilodon's medal as Victor talks with the mysterious woman. Erika decides to interview Team Iceland who will be going up against Team Kenya after their respective victories. She meets Belmont, his killer whale-type Medabot Orkamar, and his teammates Heckla and Batona and their giant squid-type Medabots Aviking where they are working on digging up a hot spring. Two different incidents have caused Belmont to fall into the water. The next day, Belmont has come down with a fever. Erika tries to speak to Victor to get him to postpone the match until Belmont recovers, only to decline and that Belmont should forfeit instead. Afterwards, Brass is approached by Warbandit who has some information for her. When it comes to the match between Team Iceland and Team Kenya, the stage is set to include a half-water stage. During the match, both Aviking managed to subdue Rhinorush and Goriongo. Because of Belmont's illness, Orkamar struggles against Warbandit and is defeated. Victor claims Orkamar's medal much to Erika's dismay as Victor states that he is only following the rules. When the chairman of the World Medabot Federation and three of its members arrive to give a speech that will lead into Team Japan's match against Team Kenya, Ikki is surprised that they are actually Seaslug, Gillgirl, Squidguts, and Shrimplips in disguise.
"The Calm Before the Storm"	48	June 2, 2000	October 12, 2002	With the disguised Seaslug, Gillgirl, Squidguts, and Shrimplips running the World Medabot Federation's rule about the loser giving up their medals, this is also a surprise for Miss Caviar who still harbors feelings for Seaslug. Dr. Aki is not sure why Sumilodon is able to summon the Medaforce and hopes that it will be enough to defeat the Rubberobo Gang. After visiting Belmont at the hospital, Ikki finds that his school is going to cheer him on. Victor meets with the disguised Rubberobo Gang members where he gives them the medals he won in exchange for cash which is witnessed by Rokusho who fails at reasoning with Victor. With Seaslug not answering her contacts, Miss Caviar stumbles into Aki's meeting with the Phantom Renegade and blackmails them to let her be the next person who poses as Space Medafighter X. After accidentally splashing Victor, Chidori invites him and Warbandit to her home as a guest. Following their meeting with Rokusho, Ikki and Metabee find Victor and Warbandit in their home. With Chidori excusing herself, Victor tells Ikki his experience during the Ten Days of Darkness where he lost his family and village when the local Medabots went on a rampage. This led Victor to be bitter from the experience and consider the Medabots as tools. After Victor leaves the Tenryou residence, everyone prepares for the big match.
"Taking the Victor Out of Victory"	49	June 9, 2000	October 19, 2002	The day of the match between Team Japan and Team Kenya has arrived. Miss Caviar makes a grand appearance as Space Medafighter X which surprises Seaslug as Miss Caviar plans to win his heart. She brings out Belzelga as her Medabot. During the match, Warbandit, Rhinorush, and Goriongo prove to be a match for Metabee, Sumilodon, and Belzelga. The Robattle is fierce until only Metabee and Warbandit remain. Despite Warbandit being stronger and Ikki's Medawatch breaking, Metabee refuses to stay down. Metabee taps into the Medaforce. To Ikki's surprise, Warbandit taps into the Medaforce as well as both Medaforce attacks collide.
"Altered States"	50	June 16, 2000	October 20, 2002	Continuing from the last episode, Metabee and Warbandit have stopped moving for a moment. Despite being in critical condition, Metabee continues his fight with Warbandit. Just then, all the medals of the Medabots in the stadium start lighting up. Dr. Aki notes that the fail-safes in the tin pets should be preventing a repeat of the Ten Days of Darkness. Meanwhile, Rokusho and the Phantom Renegade find an antenna similar to the one that Dr. Meta-Evil's Medabot clone used. They get spotted by some unnamed Rubberobo Gang grunts and their Whitesword as Rokusho buys the Phantom Renegade time to get away. When Aki begs the disguised Rubberobo Gang members to stop the match, they will only do that if Ikki surrenders Metabee's medal to Victor. Warbandit prefers to finish his match with Metabee before he can help Victor retaliate. When Metabee and Warbandit bring out their Medaforce again, all the Medabots enter a trance. Seaslug, Gillgirl, Squidguts, and Shrimplips shed their disguises. Realizing that he has been played, Mr. Referee flees. As Meta-Evil also arrives with his cat Michael, Aki recognizes Meta-Evil as his and Professor Hushi's old colleague Dr. Armond. With Armond planning to take over the world, Aki tries to flee back to the Medabot Corporation only to discover that the Medadome has transformed into a flying fortress and now everyone is a hostage to the Rubberobo Gang.
"Waking to a Dream"	51	June 23, 2000	October 26, 2002	Metabee is in a dream state where a Sailor-Multi calls him Kyumo and takes him to a Samurai that informs him that the leader of an unnamed army is approaching with an army of several rhinoceros beetle-type Medabots Bayonet and several stag beetle-type Medabots Zorin. This dream involves the Medabots' past when it came to the ancient Medalorian civilization. Metabee fights several enemy Medalorians led by a Rokusho to the death at the cost of the Sailor-Multi he knows and other Medalorians on his side. While outlining his scheme for world domination, Dr. Armond dismisses Seaslug, Gillgirl, Squidguts, and Shrimplips from his services while also mentioning that he is a descendant of the Medalorians. Trying to wake Metabee up, Ikki ends up in the dream world where he successfully gets Metabee to wake up. Once that was done, all the Medabots come out of their trance as even the Whitesword used by the Rubberobo Gang revolt. Dr. Meta-Evil unleashes similar Medabot clones of himself to fight the assorted Medabots that also involve the Phantom Renegade's Arcbeetle, Patra's Cleobattler, and Joe Swihan's Wigwamo. When one Meta-Evil clone tries to hit Victor, Warbandit takes the blow and his body is destroyed. As Armond escapes, the Medadome crash-lands as everyone escapes. Armond returns in a giant-size baby-type Medabot Babbyblu.
"Metabee's Last Stand"	52	June 30, 2000	November 2, 2002	The Select Corps and their Air-Ptera are no match for the giant Babbyblu. Everyone else tries to take it down to no avail. Initiating a tactical retreat, Dr. Aki instructs Barton to initiate Plan G. This unleashes a giant Metabee that would run on the larger Medawatch that Aki gives Ikki. With Metabee not being strong enough to move the Giant Metabee, Brass, Sumilodon, Neutranurse, Peppercat, Krosserdog, Totalizer, and Kantaroth enter the cockpit to help run it. While still feeling down from being played, Mr. Referee receives some words of wisdom from the chick salesman as Mr. Referee begins the Robattle. Giant Metabee fights against Giant Babbyblu which is witnessed by Hannah and Oceana, Natalie and Octoclam, Paco and Pingen, Tom and Snowbro, the Ninja Park's presenter, the Old Master of the Sea, the Principal, Coach Mountain, Miss Mimosa, Mrs. Pimply, the Ankle Biters and Churleybear, Ainsley, Joe Swihan, Patra, the Rockers, the Gangster from "Running Scared" and his underlings, Mr. Richards, Kailey, Robinson, Baron von Banish, Kareem, Kintaro, the Student Council, Nathan, and Mr. Dragon. Rokusho recovers all the medals as Victor finds Warbandit's medal. All the Medaforce power is given to Giant Metabee, but it was unable to phase Giant Babbyblu. Metabee ejects the other Medabots and has Giant Metabee do a kamikaze strike on Giant Babbyblu enough to defeat it. After Dr. Armond and Michael had ejected at the last minute and plans to build a bigger robot, the same passerby shows up and tells him to admit defeat. Just then, an alien spaceship arrives. Professor Hushi shows up stating that the Medabots being consumed by Robattles is over as Michael sheds his helmet which contained a medal that was the descendant of the Medalorians. The passerby reveals himself to be an alien as Hushi invites Armond to travel with him. Hushi tells Rokusho that he will be away from Earth longer. Armond agrees as the passerby was revealed to have saved Metabee. After the aliens left with Hushi and Dr. Amond, the Rubberobo Gang begins to disband. Seaslug is approached by Miss Caviar and wins him over as she dons a Rubberobo suit and takes up the alias of Miss Starfish where they both plan to open a supervillain consulting agency with Gillgirl, Squidguts, and Shrimplips watching from around the corner. Victor tells Ikki that he will Robattle him with honor next time. Henry provides the opportunity by giving Victor a new Warbandit tin pet and parts. Mr. Referee then prepares to officiate the Robattle between Metabee and Warbandit. During the credits not seen in the English dub, Victor has breakfast at Ikki's house, Erika's newspaper mentions Ikki's defeat implying that Victor defeated him, Metabee and Brass are studying in a classroom with Dr. Bokchoy as their teacher, Seaslug and Miss Starfish cause trouble, Belmont and Čapek are among those who get their medals back from Ikki and his friends, the Hop Mart closes, Henry and Arcbeetle move away, and Mr. Referee and the chick salesman are shown one final time.

=== Medabots Spirits ===
Title	Ep. #	Ep. # (Total)	Original Airdate	English Airdate	Synopsis
"Kilobot Rising"	1	53	July 7, 2000	September 13, 2003	Time has passed since Dr. Armond has left Earth. The Medabot Corporation has announced a new Medawatch as a presentation is shown involving Stingray. Unfortunately, Ikki was unable to pre-order his which Erika and the Screws did. While lamenting with Metabee, Ikki meets a boy named Tak as they spar with him and his guard dog-type Medabot Komandog. Then Ikki and Metabee meet a Medabot dealer named Ms. Nae and her assistant-type Medabot Honey who offer to get him that Medawatch by tomorrow. Meanwhile, the Screws are testing out their new Medawatches when a kid named Ginkai shows up and challenges them to a "fight" with a Kilobot named Desperado who is a machine pistol-type. (Note: The English dub of the Medabot Vital Stats lists Desperado as a hammer-type Kilobot.) Desperado beats Peppercat as Ikki shows up. Ginkai also reminds him that they are in a "fight" and not in a Robattle as Desperado's ammo reloads. Because Kilobots don't have emotions, Metabee's Medaforce doesn't work on it and Desperado bests Metabee. Ginkai later mentions his victory to his benefactor Kam Kamazaki who plans to promote the Kilobots where their Ex Medals lack the personalities that the Medabots medals have. The next day, Ikki gets the Medawatch and new parts for Metabee as Tak informs them about Erika and Brass being bested by Ginkai and Desperado. They arrive just in time to prevent Desperado from destroying Brass' medal. With his new Medachange ability, Metabee defeats Desperado.
"Fighting Temptation"	2	54	July 14, 2000	September 14, 2003	As Ms. Nae runs tests on Metabee's new Medaparts, they are having a hard time with the Tinpet handling the g-force. She also mentions that the Kilobots were not made by the Medabot Corporation where she used to work. Until Metabee's faulty parts are repaired, Ikki is not to engage in any Robattles with Medabots or fights with Kilobots. With Spike having overhearing this, Samantha tells Kam and Ginkai about it in exchange for a Kilobot battery for Peppercat. It doesn't go well for Peppercat as it was forewarned that Kilobot batteries don't work for Medabots. In order to goad Ikki and Metabee into a fight, Kam and Ginkai take the tank-type Kilobot Tankbank into attacking Medabots like Stingray, Megaphant, Kintaro, and Landmotor and destroying their respective Tortoise, Knight, Kuwagata, and Bat Medals. When Honey was in danger, Metabee and Tankbank (who had Goriongo's leg part) fight to a draw. Once the parts are repaired, Ikki and Metabee fight Tankbank and defeat it. While Ikki was mad at Samantha for what she told Kam, Nae agrees to repair Peppercat.
"What the World Needs Now" (a.k.a. "Who is the Mystery Medafighter")	3	55	July 21, 2000	September 20, 2003	Kam plans to have the Kilobots go to market and comes up with a plan to promote them. It starts the next day when a bunch of skeleton-type Kilobots known as Skelbots operated by a boy named Masa attack Spike and Krosserdog as well as Femjet, Tankar, and Agadama. When Erika and Brass are attacked, a boy that was addressed and his Dogū-type Medabot Gorem 2 get out of sight as the boy summons a stag beetle-type Medabot called Roks. Ikki and Metabee come to Erika and Brass's aid as the disguised boy shows up as the Mystery Medafighter who has Roks defeat the Skelbots. The Screws hear about it and try to get a Kilobot part from Kam in exchange to no avail. They start posting information that Ikki wants to Robattle the Mystery Medafighter. At school, Ikki meets the boy that Erika addressed earlier named Zuru Zora. When Ikki and the Mystery Medafighter start to face off, Kam and Masa arrive. While Masa unleashes the Skelbots on Ikki and Metabee, Kam fights the Mystery Medafighter with soldier-type Kilobot Frontline. As Erika shows up to help Ikki, the Screws were planning to until they were given a Skelbot leg part that Samantha asked for. This caused Peppercat to lose control of the leg part and crash into the Skelbots as the Mystery Medafighter and Kam fight to a draw when it starts to rain. Ms. Nae hears about what happened as Erika plans to find out who the Mystery Medafighter is.
"Delivery Boy"	4	56	July 28, 2000	September 21, 2003	During the summer, Ikki and Metabee are asked by Chidori to deliver a briefcase of papers to Jouzou who accidentally left them behind. They head off to the Ginjyo Company where Jouzou works and accidentally run afoul of Ginkai who challenges them to a fight with Robin Hood-type Kilobot Sherwood. Because he has to get the briefcase to his father, Ikki has Metabee assist in avoiding them and run into Samantha and Peppercat in the process. At the same time, two criminals have robbed a bank as the briefcase containing the money accidentally gets switched with Jouzou's briefcase. Now Ikki and Metabee have to avoid Ginkai and Sherwood (who was equipped with the right arm of Zodiac snake-type Medabot Meduzard), Samantha and Peppercat, and the two bank robbers. During the pursuit, a police officer recognizes the bank robbers and calls for backup. Ikki and Metabee board a train where their pursuers also board it. Amidst the fight on the train, Ikki and Metabee get off with Ginkai, Sherwood (who was equipped with flying parts from rocket-type Medabot Patriorder and Tankbank's left arm), and the bank robbers not far behind them. As Metabee is equipped with flying parts from airplane-type Medabot LadyBooster and fights Sherwood, Ikki goes into the Ginjyo Company as the pursuing bank robbers are apprehended. The briefcases are returned to their respective owners. Metabee manages to defeat Sherwood. Samantha and Peppercat find themselves far from Riverview City.
"Scoop of the Century"	5	57	August 4, 2000	September 27, 2003	When a merger of the Newspaper Club and the Broadcast Club is proposed by the homeroom teacher Condie at Riverview Junior High, Erika and the Broadcast Club's leader Zumi refuse to let that happen. A contest is held to determine who will win where the loser must join their club with the other club. As Erika interviews Ikki about being the second place winner in the World Robattle Cup, Zumi is approached by Kam who gives him the camera-type Kilobot Fotoshoot which broadcasts the news as it happens. Because of Fotoshoot's broadcasts, Erika is given some advice from Ms. Nae. After hearing that Zumi is about to open the love letter for Moira she did for her secret crush Brendan, Erika has Brass fight Fotoshoot who gets equipped with Desperado's right arm. When Fotoshoot is defeated, Erika claims the letter and scolds Zumi for his actions. The next day, Erika and Zumi learn that both their clubs can stay.
"Robbed Zombies"	6	58	August 11, 2000	September 28, 2003	A boy named Tad and his vampire-type Medabot Dracudon (Note: The English dub of the Medabot Vital Stats lists lists Dracudon as a Dracula-type Medabot.) alongside a kid and his Stingray have lost a team Robattle against a Blackram and a Nin-Ninja. He is approached by Kam who suggests that he makes some modifications to Dracudon's Snake Medal. Later that night, Tad and Dracudon challenge Samantha and Peppercat to a Robattle where Dracudon does something to Peppercat. The next day, Ikki, Ms. Nae, Spike, and Sloan hear a rumor about a Medabot making other Medabots sick where they don't move in the day and move like zombies at night. Kam hears of Peppercat's infection and contacts Samantha to lure Ikki and Erika into a trap. When that is done, Peppercat attacks Brass. Fleeing from the infected Peppercat, Brass, Stingray, Blackram, Nin-Ninja, Phoenix, Agadama, Multikolor, Icknite, Foxuno, and Dr. Bokchoy, Ikki and Metabee are then challenged by Dracudon. Metabee disengages his trapped arm to avoid being infected. Ikki and Erika talk to Tad stating that what Kam made him do is wrong. Tad calls of Dracudon and gives them the antidote. Not wanting the antidote to be used, Kam attacks with the sword-type Medabot Cutter (Note: Cutter's left arm previously used by Frontline alongside Desperado's head back in "What the World Needs Now" (a.k.a. "Who is the Mystery Medafighter").) With Dracudon taking the hit for Metabee, Ikki cures all the infected Medabots. Then he, Erika, and the Screws have their Medabots fight Cutter causing Kam and Cutter to retreat. Nae later repairs Dracudon enough to undo what Kam made Tad do to his Snake Medal and is asked silly vampire questions by Metabee.
"Lights, Camera... Robattle!"	7	59	August 18, 2000	October 4, 2003	Ikki wins the Electro Kid Jam contest that allows him to appear on TV with the beautiful co-hosts Cinnamon and Sugar Girl. Samantha even wants to attend the airing. During the broadcast, Ginkai crashes the event and Robattles Ikki and Metabee with submarine-type Kilobot Locknex. Kam helps from afar enabling Ginkai's Locknex to best Metabee with some dirty tricks involving swapping out the leg parts with the legparts of boar-type Medabot Dashbutton. Ikki demands a rematch the next day. As Erika talks with Ms. Nae, Ikki and Metabee come up with a way to fight their aquatic Kilobot opponent. The next day, Ikki and Metabee's strategy against Ginkai occurs as Metabee learns to skip across the water when Locknex uses the leg parts of Seagaru and Patriorder. Kam then unleashes his Locknex that was at the bottom of the swimming pool and modified with the arm of starfish-type Medabot Starpeda. Metabee proves to be victorious against both Locknex. Frustrated with the outcome, Kam prepares to work on the king lion-type Kilobot Unitrix.
"Dark Alliance, Part 1"	8	60	August 25, 2000	October 11, 2003	As Ginkai was on his way home, he encounters the Mystery Medafighter and Rox where they defeat Ginkai's Cutter. The next day, it is Metabee's annual battery recharge as Ikki's family, Erika, and Zuru are going to the beach and Metabee refuses to stay home. The Screws hear about this and inform Kam who gives Unitrix to Ginkai. With help from Samantha, Ginkai baits Ikki and Metabee into a Robattle where Metabee starts to run out of energy. Zuru sneaks off and becomes the Mystery Medafighter where Roks' fight with Unitrix enables Ikki and Metabee to get away. Unitrix comes out on top. Afterwards, Kam invites the Mystery Medafighter who entreats him to abandon Roks in exchange for trying out the sabertooth tiger-type Kilobot Exor (Note: The Medabot Vital Stats lists Exor as a tiger-type Kilobot.). After Metabee is recharged and fixed by Ms. Nae while Samantha gains Frontline's left arm from Kam, Ikki and Metabee go looking for Ginkai for an honorable rematch only to encounter the Mystery Medafighter and Exor.
"Dark Alliance, Part 2"	9	61	September 1, 2000	October 18, 2003	Continuing from the last episode, Ginkai and Unitrix join the Mystery Medafighter and Exor in defeating Ikki. Pleased with the outcome, Kam tells the Mystery Medafighter that he can keep Exor. However, the Mystery Medafighter has been using Exor to attack the Brat Brothers and their monkey-type Kilobot Turnmonkey, Masa and his Skelbots, Kintoki and his ghoul-type Kilobot Pass-Ghoul, and Akegarasu and his electric fan-type Kilobot Gofan. Though Exor can't answer any of his questions due to lack of other commands. Ikki and Erika later find Roks as Ikki allows him to crash at his house. At an empty building, the Mystery Medafighter challenges Ginkai and Unitrix to a Robattle. Ikki shows up wanting to challenge the Mystery Medafighter with Roks causing the Mystery Medafighter to throw away the Kilowatch and reunite with Roks. Kam appears and uses the Kilowatch to control Exor as they, Ginkai, and Unitrix have a Robattle with Ikki and the Mystery Medafighter. While Unitrix gets shocked by some fallen wires when fighting Metabee, Roks defeats Exor despite a low battery. Kam and Ginkai get away while planning to have Eddie retrieve Unitrix and Exor later. With Roks now understanding the meaning of friendship, Metabee holds him up as Roks runs out of energy.
"Redrun-Away"	10	62	September 8, 2000	October 25, 2003	On a stormy night, a truck carrying the prototype of the devil-type Kilobot Redrun crashes causing Redrun to escape. A scientist informs Kam about it and the previous issue with trying to control it. Kam plan to take care of this personally. Ikki and Metabee encounter Redrun causing havoc on the street and are rescued by Ms. Nae who has heard of this Kilobot. She helps Metabee practice his Demolition Mode. Meanwhile, Kam and Ginkai use Exor and Unitrix against Redrun to no avail since Redrun is faster. Kam leaves while Ginkai and Unitrix are chased and defeated. This causes Ginkai to ask Ikki for help. Ikki encounters the Mystery Medafighter who is also looking for Redrun as they find the Screws losing to it. With help from Roks, Metabee changes into his Demolition Mode where Roks was hit by the same attack that unphased Redrun. With Redrun considering Ikki a worthy opponent and starting to Medachange, it shuts down. Kam arrives as he notes that Redrun was to run 24 hours since it was still being tested. Redrun's body is removed as Kam is satisfied with the final results. Ikki dreads the day when Redrun is complete and fully under Kam's control.
"Erika's Secret Garden"	11	63	September 15, 2000	October 26, 2003	A member of the Brat Brothers is offering a Kilobot to whoever can deliver the identity of the Mystery Medafighter which Ikki, Erika, and Zuru are not interested in. Unbeknownst to Ikki, Erika and Brass have been tending to a secret garden as she would have felt embarrassed if anyone found out about this hobby. This gets complicated when three unnamed Medafighters that each own Blackram, Nin-Ninja, and Stingray target the Mystery Medafighter to take up the Brat Brother's bounty as the resulting battle wrecks Erika's secret garden. Displeased that the Mystery Medafighter showed no remorse over what the resulting Robattle caused, Erika decides to take up the bounty. Kam is informed of this as the Brat Brother is given the monkey-type Kilobot Hanumonkey. Erika finds the Mystery Medafighter and Roks fighting the Brat Brothers where the other two brothers are also shown to own a Hanumonkey. When Ikki gets the photo from Erika, the Brat Brothers work to claim it from Ikki. The Mystery Medafighter and Roks help Ikki and Metabee defeat the Brat Brothers and their Hanumonkeys. Afterwards, Erika has a Robattle with the Mystery Medafighter. When the Robattle starts to near the secret garden, the Mystery Medafighter has Roks stop fighting. Erika destroys the memory card and thanks the Mystery Medafighter from wrecking the secret garden.
"Metabee's Out of Body Exp"	12	64	September 22, 2000	November 1, 2003	In light of the Redrun incident, Dr. Aki has called Ikki and his friends to a Medabot laboratory where he analyzes the data from Metabee's last fight with Redrun. As Zuru arrives at the laboratory, the Screws get lost and run into Ginkai who has them show him the way. Dr. Aki reveals the new Medabots consisting of the Hercules beetle-type Medabot Arcbeetle Dash and the stag beetle-type Medabot Tyrelbeetle while talking little about the inventor of the Kilobots. When testing the new Medabots, Ikki places Metabee's medal into Arcbeetle Dash while Zuru places Gorem-2's medal into Tyrelbeetle. When the Screws arrive with Ginkai, they find Metabee's motionless body as Ginkai decides to steal it. He tells the Screws to make off with it with Eddie's help as he covers their escape. Metabee does well in Arcbeetle Dash's body, but finds it too heavy for him to use. They run into Ginkai who challenges Metabee with Unitrix. Despite some difficulty, Metabee defeats Ginkai in Arcbeetle Dash's body and Ginkai is ejected from the laboratory. Dr. Aki allows Ikki to borrow Arcbeetle Dash until they can find Metabee's body. They run into Ginkai, Unitrix, Kam, and Exor in the subway where they challenge Ikki for a Robattle for the fate of Metabee's body. Metabee manages to best his opponents while Peppercat saves Metabee's body. Metabee regains his body and Arcbeetle Dash is returned to Dr. Aki.
"The Bee Rescues the Honey"	13	65	September 29, 2000	November 8, 2003	Ginkai checks the Medanetboard and finds something horrifying after receiving an email from Kam. Meanwhile, Ms. Nae is reparing some Medaparts as Honey is dispatched to deliver a Churleybear arm to a boy named Tetsuo. She stumbles upon something she saw in Ginkai's room causing Ginkai to abduct Honey and work on erasing her memory. Ms. Nae enlists Ikki and Metabee to help find Honey. After Tetsuo claims the Churleybear arm near Ginkai's house, they find Ginkai trying to work on erasing Honey's memory. Metabee escapes with Honey into the sewers causing Ikki and Ms. Nae to resume their search the next day. Ginkai and Unitrix catch up to Metabee and Honey due to Ginkai placing a tracker on Honey. Seeing a notice of Metabee and Honey on a runaway truck, Ikki and Ms. Nae instruct Metabee on how to stop the runaway truck. Afterwards, Ms. Nae sees what Ginkai was trying to delete which was his sister deleting the saved game he was close to completing. This ends up made worse when the police and the reporters ask about the footage.
"A Night In The Medabot Junkyard"	14	66	October 6, 2000	November 15, 2003	Sloan and Totalizer have lost a lot of Robattles including the ones he had with Spyke and Krosserdog and Tak and Komandog. Ikki comments that Sloan losing must have something to do with Totalizer causing Totalizer to run away later that night. Arriving in a junkyard, Totalizer encounters Fossilkat (Note: Despite being a magical girl-type Medabot, the Fossilkat in this episode was listed in the English dub's Metabot Vital Stats as a witch-type Medabot.) who has issues towards humans. The next day, Sloan enlists Ikki and Metabee to help find Totalizer. Sloan's contact of Totalizer alerts Fossilkat who attacks him with some Tinpets. This was enough for Ikki, Metabee, and Sloan to get Totalizer's location. Arriving at the junkyard with help from Ms. Nae, they fight their way passed the Tinpets where Fossilkat is their leader. The backstory was that Fossilkat was abandoned the day her owner grew up causing Fossilkat to dislike humans. After Sloan reasons with Totalizer, they help Ikki and Metabee defeat the Tinpets and Fossilkat. Now knowing the backstory, Ms. Nae takes Fossilkat and the Tinpets to her workshop where she repairs them and has them sold to new Medafighters. Ikki tells Metabee that they will still be together when he gets old.
"Once A Medafighter, Part 1"	15	67	October 13, 2000	November 22, 2003	Ginkai's sister Sarah recalls that Ginkai had been nicer when he used to own Bayonet. After giving new Kilobot parts to Ginkai, Kam is informed that Redrun is almost complete. Kam then takes Exor and joins Ginkai and Unitrix in defeating a kid and his Nin-Ninja. Ginkai has more memories with Bayonet as they once helped a kid and his kappa-type Medabot Kappalord who were being bullied by an older kid and his giant golem-themed Medabot Gentleheart. After that flashback, Ginkai hears Ikki, Metabee, and Erika talking about a Medabot tournament held by the Medabot Corporation that will offer Arcbeetle Dash and Tyrelbeetle as the prizes. Ginkai takes up the alias of the Lone Stranger to enter the tournament as the Screws also enter the tournament which the crow-type Medabot Crow Tengu is acting as the referee. During the tournament, Ginkai doesn't take up cheating. Metabee defeats his opponents Wigwamo, Phoenix, Hakado, Banisher, and T-Mummy. Krosserdog surrenders to Peppercat. Unitrix defeats Totalizer and Gorem-2. Ikki, "Lone Stranger" and Samantha advance to the semi-finals. After Metabee bests Attack-Tyrano in the semi-finals, Ikki learns of Ginkai's identity. They duel honorably until time runs out. Before the sudden death overtime begins, Kam crashes the event with Redrun as Ginkai fails to get him to leave the tournament. When Redrun defeats Metabee, Ginkai takes action by having Unitrix fight Redrun to keep it from destroying Metabee's medal.
"Once A Medafighter, Part 2"	16	68	October 20, 2000	December 6, 2003	Continuing from the last episode, Kam's Redrun badly defeats Ginkai's Unitrix. The Mystery Medafighter arrives with Roks to fight Redrun. Roks disables Redrun causing Kam to retreat vowing to have his revenge on Ginkai. Because the tournament ended in a draw, Dr. Aki allows Ikki and Metabee to take Archbeetle Dash and Tyrelbeetle. Ikki declines and Ginkai takes both Medabots. Ms. Nae states that the damage to Unitrix was severe causing Ginkai to bury Unitrix. The Mystery Medafighter visits Ginkai at Unitrix' grave as he learns more about Ginkai's flashback with Bayonet where they had a falling out that resulted in Ginkai burying the medal and losing an upcoming tournament by default which led to him meeting Kam and getting Desperado. Once Redrun was repaired, Kam had it destroy his Exor. Metabee is also repaired, but has lost his memory. Ginkai retrieves Bayonet's medal from its burial spot. With Bayonet having been gifted to his cousin as mentioned by Sarah, Ginkai places the medal into Arcbeetle Dash as they reconcile. During Ginkai's Robattle with Kam, Redrun proves to be difficult for Arcbeetle Dash. The Mystery Medafighter then arrives and asks for the Medawatch that is associated with Tyrelbeetle. He gains it and operates Tyrelbeetle. With Redrun still proving to be difficult, Arcbeetle Dash and Tyrelbeetle pull off a Meda-Combo to form Masterbeetle who defeats Redrun. After Kam gets away vowing revenge, Arcbeetle Dash smacking Metabee helps him regain his memories.
"Title Flight"	17	69	October 27, 2000	December 13, 2003	Ms. Nae tests out a remote-controlled custom toy biplane with Ikki, Metabee, and Zuru's help. There was a malfunction and it collides with the hawk-type Kilobot Flyfalcon who Kam was testing causing their radio signals to get crossed. This causes Flyfalcon to fly off with Metabee. To protect the company's secrets, Kam sets Flyfalcon to self-destruct in 100 minutes after Ikki fails to reason with him. After Ikki explains what is happening to Metabee, Ms. Nae persuades Eddie to let her borrow the VTOL that he and Kam were using. Eddie allows her to as Ms. Nae takes Ikki and Zuru in it. Getting close, Ikki tries to get Metabee to land Flyfalcon which doesn't go well when they land in the middle of a busy street. The struggle is witnessed at the airport by Dr. Aki and his assistant. When the VTOL is damaged, Ms. Nae lands it in order to give it some repairs. Zuru slips off to become the Mystery Medafighter and summons Roks and Tyrelbeetle. They catch Metabee with Ms. Nae going along with the Mystery Medafighter's plan, but Flyfalcon attacks them. Metabee and Flyfalcon land on the wing of an airplane that Dr. Aki is in. Metabee then does a risky move to get himself and Flyfalcon off the airplane. Tyrelbeetle manages to eject Metabee's medal enabling Ikki to transport Metabee away just in time as Flyfalcon explodes.
"The Agony of the Cheat"	18	70	November 3, 2000	December 20, 2003	Ikki's parents are not pleased that he has low grades on his report card. Until he can pull the grades up, he is forbidden to engage in any Robattles. With the next test being tomorrow, Ikki tries to study only to fall asleep with no improvements to the grade causing Ikki to come up with different reasons why he can't Robattle Ginkai. The only thing Ikki can come up with to get an improved grade is to cheat. While in his classroom, Ikki sends Metabee to meet up with Ms. Nae and read some things from a piece of paper. Zuru tries to help Ikki with Gorem-2's help only to nearly be caught by Samantha. Along the way, Metabee ends up accidentally hitting Masa's Skelbots. Arriving at Ms. Nae's workshop, Metabee tells Ms. Nae a cover story that he wants her to help him study for his upcoming homework. Masa and the Skelbots catch up to Metabee and go on the attack. Ginkai shows up and summons Arcbeetle Dash to fight the Skelbots. Metabee accidentally admits to the cheating scam as When one of the Skelbots dumps paint on Arcbeetle Dash's head, Ginkai had to coordinate it in order to defeat the Skelbots. Ms. Nae reproves Ikki and Metabee for the cheating scam. With the test over, Ikki persuades Condie to let him take the test over. While he was not pleased with Ikki's cheating scam, he was pleased with his honesty. The next day, Ikki passes his test which impresses his parents enough to let Ikki engage in Robattling. He and Ginkai finally have their Robattle.
"It's the Medafighter Way"	19	71	November 10, 2000	December 21, 2003	Kam is still working on a plan to get revenge on Ginkai. The next day, Tak and Komandog are challenged by a girl named Suzy and her catgirl-type Medabot Puttycat. When Suzy throws a tantrum upon Puttycat being hit, Ginkai appears and advises Tak not to call on Ikki for help. Though Komandog loses, Suzy orders Puttycat to continue the attack causing Ginkai to summon Arcbeetle Dash to defeat Puttycat. Moments after that defeat, Suzy is approached by Kam who gives her the jewel beetle-type Kilobot Ambiguous 2 so that she can have her revenge on Ginkai. Even though Ginkai is no longer a Rogue Medafighter, Samantha tries to no avail to get the Kilobots that he is not using as they would not work well with Peppercat. Ginkai's house is then attacked by Suzy and Ambiguous 2 as Samantha calls Ikki for help. Ikki couldn't assist Ginkai and Arcbeetle Dash against Suzy and Ambiguous 2 until Kam appears with an Exor. Before Ikki and Metabee can help, the Mystery Medafighter shows up and has Roks and Tyrelbeetle hold back Metabee so that Ginkai can fight Ambiguous 2 and Exor. Arcbeetle Dash is defeated by Ambiguous 2 and Exor as Suzy and Kam leave with satisfaction. Ikki tells Ginkai that he will help him if he needs him.
"Fall from Grace, Part 1"	20	72	November 17, 2000	December 27, 2003	Ikki and Metabee see a commercial for Kilobots with Unitrix displayed and that a Kilobot shop has opened. When Ikki and Metabee to go Ms. Nae for advice, they see a press conference from Extreme Tech's CEO Henry McKenna stating that they created the Kilobots to be a friendly competition for the Medabots. Kam is also present at the press conference and it is revealed that he is the son of Bacchus Concern's president Shin Kamazaki. Back at his house, Kam plans to deal with Ikki and Metabee so that they won't be in the way. The next day, Ikki gets a call from Suzy stating that she is being held in Bacchus Tower. While suspecting that it might be a trap, Ikki and Metabee go there to honor a Robattle challenge. When they arrive, they are attacked by an Exor. Thanks to Kam's workers tampering with the footage, it is appearing to anyone watching this that Metabee is the one fighting aggressively. Erika sees the Brat Brothers enticing the crowd into booing at Metabee. After Exor retreats, Ikki and Metabee make their way to the top floor of the Bacchus Tower where Kam has hired a boy named Banjo to control Redrun. Thanks to the same trick, Redrun is being seen as Exor with Metabee remaining unchanged on the screen as Redrun defeats Metabee. After the transmission was disrupted, Kam and Suzy appear as Kam thanks Banjo for operating Redrun and mention what is happening outside Bacchus Tower. Erika plans to find a way to clear Ikki and Metabee's names.
"Fall from Grace, Part 2"	21	73	November 24, 2000	December 28, 2003	Continuing from the last episode, 100 KBT Kilobots are fighting each other until only one remains with an eye injury. Kam congratulates the rhinoceros beetle-type survivor who is named Blakbeetle. Now that the Kilobot store is opened, Suzy is signing autographs as two Medafighters named Mintora and Kintora show up to buy their Kilobots. Zumi tells Erika that everyone saw what Metabee did to Exor and even asks how anyone can manipulate the broadcast. She ends up calling in a favor from Zumi to help look into this. Ginkai and Arcbeetle Dash find Ikki and Metabee by the river sulking over what Kam did to them and forwards a message to them from Ms. Nae to continue Robattling with honor. With Mintora and Kintora testing out their Unitrix and Exor after putting their Banisher and Nin-Ninja in storage, Kam instructs Mintora and Kintora to challenge Ikki and Metabee by drawing them to the Riverview Stadium. When Moira notices Ikki and Metabee enter Riverview Stadium where the Rogue Medafighters are also entering, she runs off to warn Erika. She leaves Zumi to continue investigating. Ikki and Metabee are surrounded by Mintora, Unitrix, Kintora, Exor, Masa, his Skelbots, Suzy, Ambiguous 2, the Brat Brothers, and their Hanumonkeys. As Ikki and Metabee fight with honor, Erika records the fight as Ms. Nae comes up with an idea and persuades Eddie to help make the live broadcast. Thanks to the broadcast, the public opinion towards Ikki and Metabee changes as they cheer them on. Ginkai and Arcbeetle Dash show up help Ikki and Metabee as some people fill the stadium seets. As Suzy orders Ambiguous 2 to continue attacking, Blakbeetle shows up and defeats Ambiguous 2. Kam admits that his plan failed and leaves with the Rogue Medafighters. During the departure, Blakbeetle tells Metabee that they will meet again. Erika is happy that the innocence of Ikki and Metabee have been proven.
"Mystery Medafighter Unmasked?"	22	74	December 1, 2000	January 3, 2004	
"The Truth About Charlie"	23	75	December 8, 2000	January 4, 2004	
"Roks Reborn"	24	76	December 15, 2000	January 10, 2004	
"I, Kilobot"	25	77	December 22, 2000	January 11, 2004	
"Thanks for the Memories"	26	78	December 29, 2000	January 17, 2004	
"How Spyke Got His Style Back"	27	79	January 5, 2001	January 18, 2004	
"The Medabot Straight Line Marathon"	28	80	January 12, 2001	January 24, 2004	
"Kung Fu For Thought"	29	81	January 19, 2001	January 25, 2004	
"Erika to the Rescue"	30	82	January 26, 2001	May 2004	
"Rough on a Hot Tin Cat"	31	83	February 2, 2001	February 14, 2004	
"Meda-Forced"	32	84	February 9, 2001	February 15, 2004	
"Poor Miss Nae"	33	85	February 16, 2001	February 21, 2004	
"Mystery Medafighter... Revealed!"	34	86	February 23, 2001	February 22, 2004	
"Winner Take All" (a.k.a. "Medabots Are Friends")	35	87	March 2, 2001	February 28, 2004	
"Transfusion Confusion"	36	88	March 9, 2001	February 29, 2004	
"Gryphon Doom" (a.k.a. "Forbidden Evil Medal")	37	89	March 16, 2001	March 6, 2004	
"Final Goodbyes"	38	90	March 23, 2001	March 7, 2004	
"Into The Fire"	39	91	March 30, 2001	May 8, 2004	

== Home video releases ==
=== DVD Region 1 (North America) ===
The following was released as Nelvana held the license, all dub only in its order. Medabots was first released in North America by ADV Films as 12 separate volumes from 2002 to 2003 covering the first two seasons. The first three volumes were later re-released in 2005 under ADV Kidz via their Essential Anime Collection. Later, Shout! Factory released a 4-disc DVD box set in 2008 covering the first season.

ADV Films DVD Singles
Volume	Date	Episodes
Volume 1 - Transport Metabee!	April 30, 2002	1–5
Volume 2 - Medabots, Robattle!	June 25, 2002	6–9
Volume 3 - Time to Robattle!	August 6, 2002	10–13
Volume 4 - Medabot Wars	September 17, 2002	14–17
Volume 5 - Use the Medaforce!	October 29, 2002	18–21
Volume 6 - The Face of Dr. Meta-Evil	December 10, 2002	22–26
Volume 7 - Back in the Robattle Again	January 21, 2003	27–31
Volume 8 - Love and Medabots	March 4, 2003	32–35
Volume 9 - A Taste of Medabots	May 6, 2003	36–39
Volume 10 - World-Class Medabots	July 1, 2003	40–43
Volume 11 - Medabots to the Tournament!	September 2, 2003	44–47
Volume 12 - Medabots Forever!	November 4, 2003	48–52

Shout! Factory DVD Box Set
Season	Date	Episodes
The Complete First Season	January 15, 2008	1-26

=== Blu-ray Region A (North America) ===
The license was transferred to Discotek Media, a company known for rescuing other anime from other distributors. All of the following are SD Blu-rays that are meant to play the show in Standard Definition on a Blu-ray Disc, albeit the decreased number of discs meaning convenience for collectors, thus it would be lower in price than the DVD release. They released all three seasons of the dub version (in the order Nelvana presented) from 2019 to 2021 with optional English SDH subtitles, and then release the sub version (in its order) later in the future.

On June 11, 2020, Justin Sevakis said Discotek Media were unable to find the masters for the English version of Medabots Spirits which has prevented the anime from being released on home video in North America. Discotek Media has asked fans to help find the masters, and on September 14, 2020, they have found suitable masters, meaning Medabots Spirits would get its first-ever North American physical release on May 25, 2021.

Discotek Media SD Blu-ray Collections
Season	Date	Episodes
The Complete First Season (Dubbed)	December 24, 2019	1-26
The Complete Second Season (Dubbed)	July 28, 2020	27–52
The Complete Third Season (Dubbed)	May 25, 2021	53–91
The Original Japanese Language First Series (Subbed)	June 27, 2023	1-52
The Original Japanese Language Second Series (Subbed)	March 26, 2024	53–91
