= Phyllis and Flora =

Medieval Latin song

"Phyllis and Flora" is the name of a medieval Latin song known from about a dozen sources. None of those sources has the complete poem; the version from the Carmina Burana, for example, only contains the first sixty one and a half stanzas, with the rest being lost prior to binding. It tells the story of a debate between two young women as to which type of man makes a better lover: clerics or knights. Unable to resolve the dispute, the two travel to the court of Cupid, where it is decided that clerics are superior. Translators and commentators have wryly noted that this is unsurprising, as the piece was almost certainly written by a Goliardic cleric.

The title of the poem is not given in the original Latin. Translators and commentators have variously titled the piece "Phyllis and Flora", "All About Phyllis and Flora", and so on. The earliest known English translation was published in 1595 under the title "The Amorous Contention of Phillis and Flora", in George Chapman's Ovid's Banquet of Sence. A 1598 version was published as simply "Phyllis and Flora", with the subtitle of "The Sweete and Ciuill Contention of Two Amorous Ladyes". That version was translated under the byline of "R.S. Esquire" who, according to the Dictionary of National Biography, was most likely Richard Stapleton, a friend of Chapman.

== Synopsis ==
The poem is composed of four parts. In the first part, covering stanzas one through eleven, Phyllidis and Flore are introduced as two young maids of great beauty who are relaxing in the locus amoenus of a wooded area beside a stream. They pause to cool their feet in the water. The second part, covering stanzas twelve through forty three, discusses the dispute between the two. Phyllis, who favours knights, and Flora, who favours clerics, relate their arguments regarding which type of man makes for a better lover. Phyllis notes that knights are rugged men who work hard and are not given to the laziness of clerics while Flora argues that clerics do not waste their energy on battle, but reserve it for better love-making, and so on. The argument continues more or less evenly, though Flora is given somewhat more lines to boast about clerics. For the third part, covering stanzas forty four to fifty nine, the women travel to the court of Cupid to seek his opinion on the matter. Much of the material discusses the richness of the women's clothing and mounts. Finally, in the fourth part, covering stanzas sixty through seventy nine, the women arrive at Cupid's court. However, Cupid does not render a verdict himself and leaves the matter to his court. Their decision is that clerics are the superior lovers and the poem ends with a moral warning women against trusting their honour to a knight.

== Analysis ==
=== Structure ===
The poem is structured very rigidly; there are seventy-nine four-line stanzas, each monorhymed. Every line uses trochaic meter and contains a caesura.

Original

Anni parte florida, celo puriore,
picto terre gremio vario colore,
dum fugaret sidera nuntius Aurore,
liquit somnus oculos Phyllidis et Flore.

Free translation (by Parlett)

It was the flowery time of year - the sky was never purer:
Mother Earth was all arrayed in colourful bravura:
stars were being swept away by order of Aurora -
when sleep arose and fled the eyes of Phyllis and of Flora.

Literal translation (by Walsh)

In the blooming season of the year, as the sky grew clearer and the earth's bosom was dappled with a range of colors, when Dawn's messenger routed the stars, sleep quitted the eyes of Phyllis and Flora.

=== Background ===
Like many of the pieces in the Carmina Burana, and medieval poetry in general, the author of the piece is unknown. Some commentators, such as David Parlett, have suggested that it may be Italian in origin.

The general concept of a literary disputation such as this has a long history. In his analysis, P.G. Walsh traces the line back as far as Aristophanes' work The Frogs, which features a dispute between Aeschylus and Euripides for the title of "Best Tragic Poet", and Ovid's Amores. Examples from medieval Europe include "Altercatio Ganymedis et Helenae" and "Dialogus inter Aquam et Vinum", the last of which may have more directly inspired another disputation in the Carmina Burana, "The Dispute Between Water and Wine".

A satirical piece called "The Love Council of Remiremont" has especially close ties to the "Phyllis and Flora" work. Both Walsh and Haller consider it to be the work upon which "Phyllis and Flora" is based. It, in turn, was apparently based on an incident in 1151, where Pope Eugene III censured the Remiremont Abbey for its licentious ways. The Remiremont work also features a dispute between whether knights or clerics make better lovers, however it is nuns that do the arguing and the proponents of the knights end up getting excommunicated.
