= Dream world (plot device) =

Fantasy about worlds accessed through dreams

Dream worlds (also called dream realms, illusory realms, or dreamscape) are a common plot device in fictional works, most notably in science fiction and fantasy fiction. The use of a dream world creates a situation in which a character or group of characters is placed in a marvelous and unpredictable environment and must overcome personal problems to leave it.

== Description ==
The dream world commonly serves to teach some moral or religious lessons to the character experiencing it – a lesson that the other characters will be unaware of, but one that will influence decisions made regarding them. When the character is reintroduced into the real world, usually when they wake up, the question arises as to what exactly constitutes reality due to the vivid recollection and experiences in the dream world.

According to J. R. R. Tolkien, dream worlds contrast with fantasy worlds, in which the world exists independently of the characters in it. However, other authors have used the dreaming process as a way of accessing a world which, within the context of the fiction, holds as much consistency and continuity as physical reality. The use of "dream frames" to contain a fantasy world and explain its marvels has been criticized, with the device becoming less prevalent as a result.

== Fictional dream worlds ==
=== Literature ===
A similar motif, Locus amoenus, is popular in medieval literature, especially allegory and romance. A dream world is sometimes invoked in dream visions such as The Book of the Duchess and Piers Plowman.

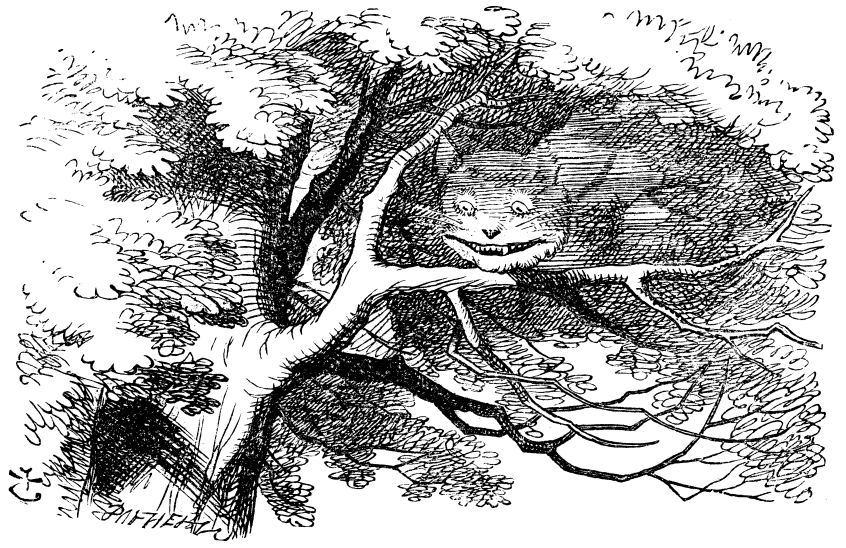
The Cheshire Cat vanishes in Wonderland.

One of the best-known dream worlds is Wonderland from Lewis Carroll's Alice's Adventures in Wonderland, as well as the Looking-Glass world from its sequel, Through the Looking-Glass. Unlike many dream worlds, Carroll's logic is like that of actual dreams, with transitions and causality flexible. James Branch Cabell's Smirt, along with its two sequels, form an extended dream, with most of the action taking place in a dream world.

The action of The Bridge by Iain M. Banks takes place in a dream world. Other fictional dream worlds include the Dreamlands of H. P. Lovecraft's Dream Cycle and The Neverending Story's world of Fantasia, which includes places like the Desert of Lost Dreams, the Sea of Possibilities and the Swamps of Sadness. Dreamworlds, shared hallucinations and other alternate realities feature in a number of works by Philip K. Dick, such as The Three Stigmata of Palmer Eldritch and Ubik. Similar themes were explored by Jorge Luis Borges in The Circular Ruins.

In The Wheel of Time book series, "Tel'aran'rhiod" is a dream world that exists in close proximity to the real world, with objects and physical locations that do not frequently change in the real world having parallels in Tel'aran'rhiod. Ordinary people can occasionally enter Tel'aran'rhiod during their sleep, with events that occur within having physical consequences; a person that dies in Tel'aran'rhiod will never wake up again, and in several cases, it is shown that physical injuries sustained there persist in the waking world. Tel'aran'rhiod can be controlled similar to a lucid dream, and several characters in the series can enter and manipulate Tel'aran'rhiod at will while asleep. Detaching oneself from Tel'aran'rhiod can allow a person to see directly into the dreams of others or enter them, but this carries risks, especially if the inquirer has a particularly strong emotional bond with the dreaming person. It is also possible, yet highly taboo, for a person to physically enter Tel'aran'rhiod with their actual body, rather than just metaphysically while asleep, though this risks disturbing the fabric of the dream world.

Paprika (1993) by Yasutaka Tsutsui is a science fiction novel that involves entering dream worlds using technology. In the book, dream monitoring and intervention as a means of treating mental disorders is a developing new form of psychotherapy in the near future. Unrest ensues when a new psychotherapy dream-analysis device is stolen, allowing the assailant to enter and manipulate people's dreams.

In the 1971 feminist science fiction novel The Kin of Ata Are Waiting for You, the Kin of Ata maintain the real world through their dreaming, making the real world a form of dream.

=== Film ===
In the 1939 movie, Oz from The Wonderful Wizard of Oz was altered from a fantasy world in the novel to a dream world of Dorothy's; characters who were independent inhabitants of Oz were transformed into dream parallels of introduced Kansas characters.

In the 1999 film The Matrix, Neo and humanity live inside a dream world, with their brains hooked up to a computer network that creates this dream world. However, some may argue that this is not a dream world, as it seems completely normal and indistinguishable from reality aside from time differences. In the 1980s, the Nightmare on Elm Street series of horror films introduced a dark dream realm inhabited by the supernatural serial killer Freddy Krueger.

In the film Sharkboy and Lavagirl, the main characters enter a world dreamt up by Max in order to save the real world.

In the film Monkeybone, Down Town is the purgatory-themed land of nightmares where comatose people go.

Dreamworlds also appear in Total Recall and Vanilla Sky.

Paprika (2006), an anime film adaptation of the 1993 novel of the same name, involves entering and manipulating dream worlds using dream-analysis devices.

The 2001 film Waking Life takes place almost entirely in a dream realm.

In the 2010 film Inception, main characters create artificial dream worlds which they can bring others into without them knowing. This can involve 'Extraction', stealing memories and secrets, 'Inception', planting an idea into the mind, and others.

=== Comic books and graphic novels ===
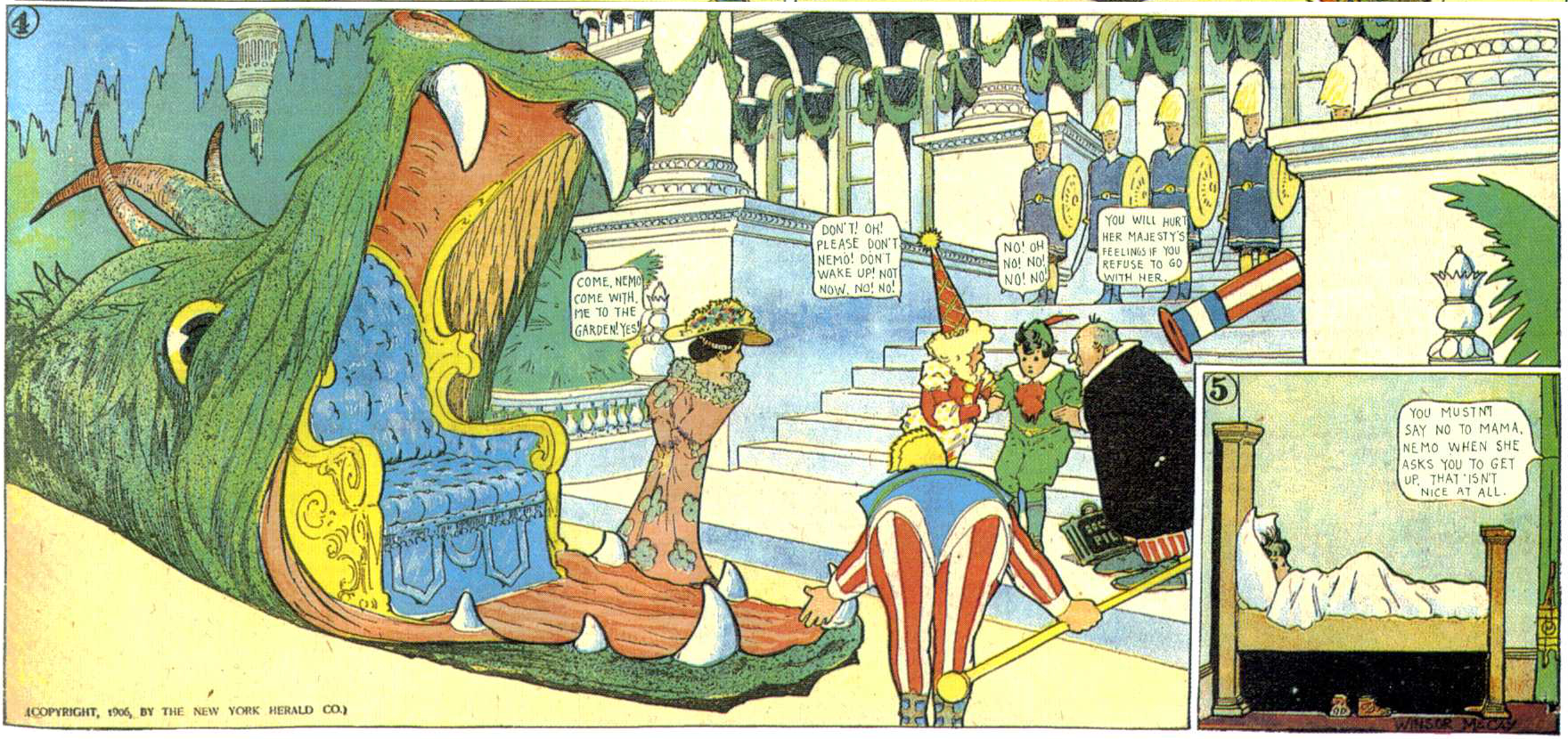
A panel from Little Nemo (1906)

One of the earliest newspaper comic strips was Little Nemo which had a dream world theme where the dream world was called Slumberland and was ruled by King Morpheus.

Writer Neil Gaiman was tasked with re-imagining a Golden Age character "The Sandman". In his version, the Sandman becomes Dream, the Lord of Dreams, known under various aliases, including Morpheus and Oneiros, who is the personification of dreams. The dream world in the comics was also called "The Dreaming". At the start of the series, Morpheus is captured by an occult ritual and held prisoner for 70 years. In the modern day, he escapes and avenges himself by defeating his captors, after which he sets about rebuilding his kingdom, which has fallen into disrepair in his absence. Later comics reveal that Dream is the source of Wesley Dodds' prophetic dreams. It was also revealed that the previously known "Dream Dimension" that its Sandman Garrett Sandford and his later successor Hector Hall can only leave for an hour a day was just a "Pocket Dream Dimension" established in the mind of Jed Walker by Brute and Glob.

==== Manga ====
Dream worlds also appear in Rozen Maiden, the Outback(s) of The Maxx, the webcomic The Dreamland Chronicles, and the film Sailor Moon Super S the Movie: Black Dream Hole.

In Clamp manga series such as X/1999, Tsubasa: Reservoir Chronicle and xxxHolic, the dream world is important to the events that occur within each story. It is later revealed in xxxHolic that the dream world itself is its own world, as part of the Clamp multiverse. Similarly, in the Bone graphic novel series by Jeff Smith, the primary plot device is a dream world called "The Dreaming". It exists independently from the real world, and it is described similarly to a river, being said to "flow" through people in "currents".

=== Television ===
CITV's 1990s animated children's television series, The Dreamstone, takes place in the Land of Dreams and the Land of Nightmares.

In Jay Jay the Jet Plane, adventures where air-breathing jet planes cannot go, such as underwater and in space, happen as dreams.

The 1998 Star Trek: Voyager episode "Waking Moments" uses several dream realms and false awakenings.

In the UFO episode "Ordeal", Foster's abduction and rescue is explained as a dream.

Season 8 of Dallas was retroactively explained, at the start of Season 9, as a dream had by Bobby Ewing.

In the Xena: Warrior Princess episode, "Dreamworker", Morpheus: God of dreams abducts Gabrielle to take as his bride, with Xena pursuing them into his realm, the DreamScape, to stop the impending forced marriage.

The Doctor Who episode "Amy's Choice" depicts multiple dream worlds, which were induced by a parasitic seed. Dreamworlds are revisited in the Doctor Who Christmas special "Last Christmas", which depicts dreams within dreams caused by mind-leeching aliens.

The Dimension 20 season "The Unsleeping City" imagines New York City as being an adjacent realm to the Sixth Borough, known as Nod or the Dreaming. Future seasons of The Unsleeping City posit additional dream realms such as the Bay of Slumber, an adjacent realm to San Francisco, and the Deeper Dreaming, home to ancient and terrifying dream beings akin to the work of H. P. Lovecraft.

In Stardust Crusaders, the third part of JoJo's Bizarre Adventure, Mannish Boy and his Stand, Death 13, put Jotaro Kujo, along with his friends and grandfather, in a dream world that takes the form of an amusement park.

The American Dragon: Jake Long episode "Dreamscape" had Jake Long traveling through the dreamscape and contending with a Chimera.

The Xiaolin Showdown episode "Dreamscape" had a Shen Gong Wu called the Shadow of Fear entering anyone's mind and making their worst fears real.

The Gravity Falls episode "Dreamscaperers" takes place in the dream realm. Gideon Gleeful summons a dream demon, Bill Cipher to invade Stan Pines's mind and steal the combination to his safe. Dipper Pines with his sister Mabel and friend Soos also go into Stan's mind to stop Bill from finding out the combination.

In Archer, seasons eight to ten take place in three self-contained universes after protagonist Sterling Archer is shot and falls into a coma, experienced in a vivid dream-like state that coincides with a deeper exploration of his psyche.

In Mickey Mouse Funhouse, the episode "Dream a Little Dream" reveals that there is a location based on the dream world called the Land of Dreams which can be accessed by Funny using his funhouse tricks on anyone sleeping within them.

In the Bluey episode "Sleepytime", Bingo has a dream where she and her stuffed toy rabbit, Floppy, explore the Solar System.

=== Video games ===
The video games The Legend of Zelda: Link's Awakening and Super Mario Bros. 2 take place in a dream of the Wind Fish's, whom Link must wake up, and Mario's respectively.

In Dragon Quest VI, the game is split between two worlds initially known as the Real World and the Phantom World, named such because any being from the Real World is rendered unseen by the inhabitants of the Phantom World, like a phantom, and are only capable of becoming visible after drinking a special elixir. It is later revealed that the Phantom World is the true Real World, while the former Real World is called the Dream World, created from the dreams of the people of the Real World, in which each inhabitant has a Dream World counterpart. The main antagonist of the game, Deathtamoor, seeks to merge these worlds with his own "Dark World" in an attempt at world domination.

Alundra follows the titular protagonist, a dreamwalker who can enter people's dreams, which he uses to help the locals of a village, who are suffering from recurring nightmares that sometimes cause death.

In the first two games of the EarthBound series, the protagonist (Ninten in EarthBound Zero and Ness in EarthBound) must travel to a dream world named Magicant. However, the two Magicants are different from each other. Ninten visits his Magicant, which is light pink and has seashell spires and clouds, multiple times during the story, until it is revealed to not be his own Magicant but a collection of the memories of his great-grandmother Maria. Ness's Magicant is a surreal, spacelike land in a purple sea that he only gains access to once he records the eight melodies into his Sound Stone.

The Klonoa series follows the titular protagonist, a Dream Traveler called upon to restore balance to dreamworlds that are in peril, such as Phantomile in Klonoa: Door to Phantomile and Lunatea in Klonoa 2: Lunatea's Veil. Similarly, the Nights series, whose title character is a protector of dreams, prominently features the dreamworlds Nightopia and Nightmare, which collectively make up the Night Dimension.

In Final Fantasy VIII, the main group of protagonists experience the lives of three soldiers, Laguna, Kiros, and Ward in what they call "the dream world", which is actually the past, through a mysterious and gifted woman who is acquainted with both parties. Zanarkand in Final Fantasy X and its HD remake was a dream, along with the main character, Tidus.

In Sonic Shuffle, Maginaryworld is a dream world which a fairy asks the playable characters to help save from the antagonist Void by collecting Precioustones.

In Mario Party 5, Dream Depot is a world where all dreams go, which Bowser and Koopa Kid seek to conquer.

Tak 2: The Staff of Dreams takes place in the real world as well as the Dream World, home to the Staff of Dreams.

In Yume Nikki, Madotsuki explores dreamworlds that are part of her dreams.

In Dreamfall: The Longest Journey and Dreamfall Chapters, protagonist Zoë Castillo can travel to Marcuria by dreaming. There is also a third world called 'Storytime' inspired by the Australian Dreamtime myths, which is the place of creation and where every story begins and ends. Zoë must stop a corporation called WATI-Corp, which wants to steal dreams and memories from people through their new entertainment device: the Dreamachine which allows people to make lucid dreams.

In Fallout 3, a main storyline quest involves the protagonist, the Lone Wanderer, entering a virtual reality simulator, referred to as "Tranquility Lane", a dream world simulation of a 1950s suburban neighborhood.

In Driver: San Francisco, protagonist John Tanner falls into a coma following a car accident. The game takes place in his dream, but he is unaware of this.

In Mario & Luigi: Dream Team, there are stone pillows that Luigi can use to summon a portal to his dreams, allowing Mario to jump in and rescue the Pi'illo trapped within the pillow. In Luigi's dreams, Mario is accompanied by a version of him named Dreamy Luigi, who possesses various powers, such as cloning himself and growing to a giant size.

In Pokémon Black and White and its sequel Pokémon Black 2 and White 2, players can tuck in one of their Pokémon via the system Game Sync, allowing them to play with the Pokémon in an alternate world called the "Dream World".

In Kingdom Hearts 3D: Dream Drop Distance, as part of their Mark of Mastery exam, Sora and Riku are sent to the Sleeping Worlds, worlds that remained in a state of sleep after being destroyed by the Heartless rather than being restored, to unlock the seven Sleeping Keyholes. While Sora explores these worlds, Riku instead explores his dreams of the worlds as a Dream Eater.

Tales of Maj'Eyal features the Solipist, a class who believes the world is their own dream, although this is closer to the Dream argument than solipsism, granting them psychic powers based on lucid dreaming.

Bloodborne takes place in, or partially in, a dream realm, with areas such as the Nightmare of Mensis and the Hunter's Dream. The city the game takes place in is implied to be a collective, self-sustaining dream that its inhabitants contribute to.

Omori takes place in the real world as well as Headspace, a dream world which the protagonist Sunny created to suppress his trauma of his sister Mari's death.

In Honkai: Star Rail, Penacony, known as the Planet of Festivities, was originally a prison planet used by the Interastral Peace Corporation to exile criminals until it fell under the influence of Xipe, the Aeon of Harmony. As a result, it became a renowned, luxurious cosmic resort through the Dreamscape, a system that harnesses memoria to the power of collective dreams, forming twelve dream worlds corresponding to a "moment" on the clock that provide different forms of leisure and entertainment.

== See also ==
- Astral plane
- Astral projection
- Inner space
- Isekai
- Lucid dream
- Oneironautics
- Portal fantasy
- Simulated reality
- The Dreaming
- Vision (spirituality)
