= Literary topos =

Standardized method of treating a theme in literature

In classical Greek rhetoric, topos, pl. topoi, (from Ancient Greek: τόπος "place", elliptical for Ancient Greek: τόπος κοινός tópos koinós, 'common place'), in Latin locus (from locus communis), refers to a method for developing arguments (see topoi in classical rhetoric).

== Meaning and history ==
Topos is translated variously as "topic", "themes", "line of argument", or "commonplace". Ernst Robert Curtius studied topoi as "commonplaces", themes common to orators and writers who re-worked them according to occasion, e.g., in classical antiquity the observation that "all must die" was a topos in consolatory oratory, for in facing death the knowledge that death comes even to great men brings comfort. Curtius also discussed the topoi in the invocation of nature (sky, seas, animals, etc.) for various rhetorical purposes, such as witnessing to an oath, rejoicing or praising God, or mourning with the speaker.

== Lists of themes ==
Some examples of topoi are the following:

- the locus amoenus (for example, the imaginary world of Arcadia) and the locus horridus (for example, Dante's Inferno);
- the idyll
- cemetery poetry (see the Spoon River Anthology by Edgar Lee Masters);
- love and death (in Greek, eros and thanatos), love as disease and love as death, (see the character of Dido in Virgil's Aeneid);
- warlike love (see the work Stanze per la giostra by Angelo Poliziano), love as homage (see the courtly lyric poem), painful love;
- the world upside down;
- the dangerous night;
- the infernal hunt (see Boccaccio's Decameron, day 5, novel 8);
- aphasia, for example in the presence of the beloved woman (see the works belonging to the Dolce stil novo current, for example Al cor gentil rempaira sempre amore by Guido Guinizelli);
- the descensus ad inferos, or catàbasis in Greek (see Dante's entire Inferno, or the Aeneid, sixth book);
- the desperate search for something, or quête in French;
- the golden age;
- The nostos: the return trip to the homeland (e.g. the Odyssey)
- the paraclausithyron, lament before the closed door of the lover;
- the commutatio loci;
- elixir of eternal youth;
- the Fountain of Youth;
- the topos modestiæ;
- pretending that the work is inspired or translated by a pseudobiblion (e.g. The Betrothed or The Lord of the Rings).
- Hybris

== See also ==
- Argumentation scheme
- Trope (literature)
