= Smirt =

1934 novel by James Branch Cabell

- dust-jacket illustration for Smirt
- Author: James Branch Cabell
- Language: English
- Series: The Nightmare Has Triplets
- Genre: Satire
- Publisher: Robert M. McBride
- Publication date: 1934
- Publication place: United States
- Media type: Print (Hardback)
- Pages: 309
- ISBN: 1-59224-273-1 (reprint)
- Followed by: Smith: A Sylvan Interlude

Smirt: An Urbane Nightmare is a 1934 satirical romance novel by American writer James Branch Cabell, the opening volume in his trilogy The Nightmare Has Triplets. The two later romances of this trilogy are Smith and Smire.
