= Locus amoenus =

Literary topos involving an idealized place of safety or comfort

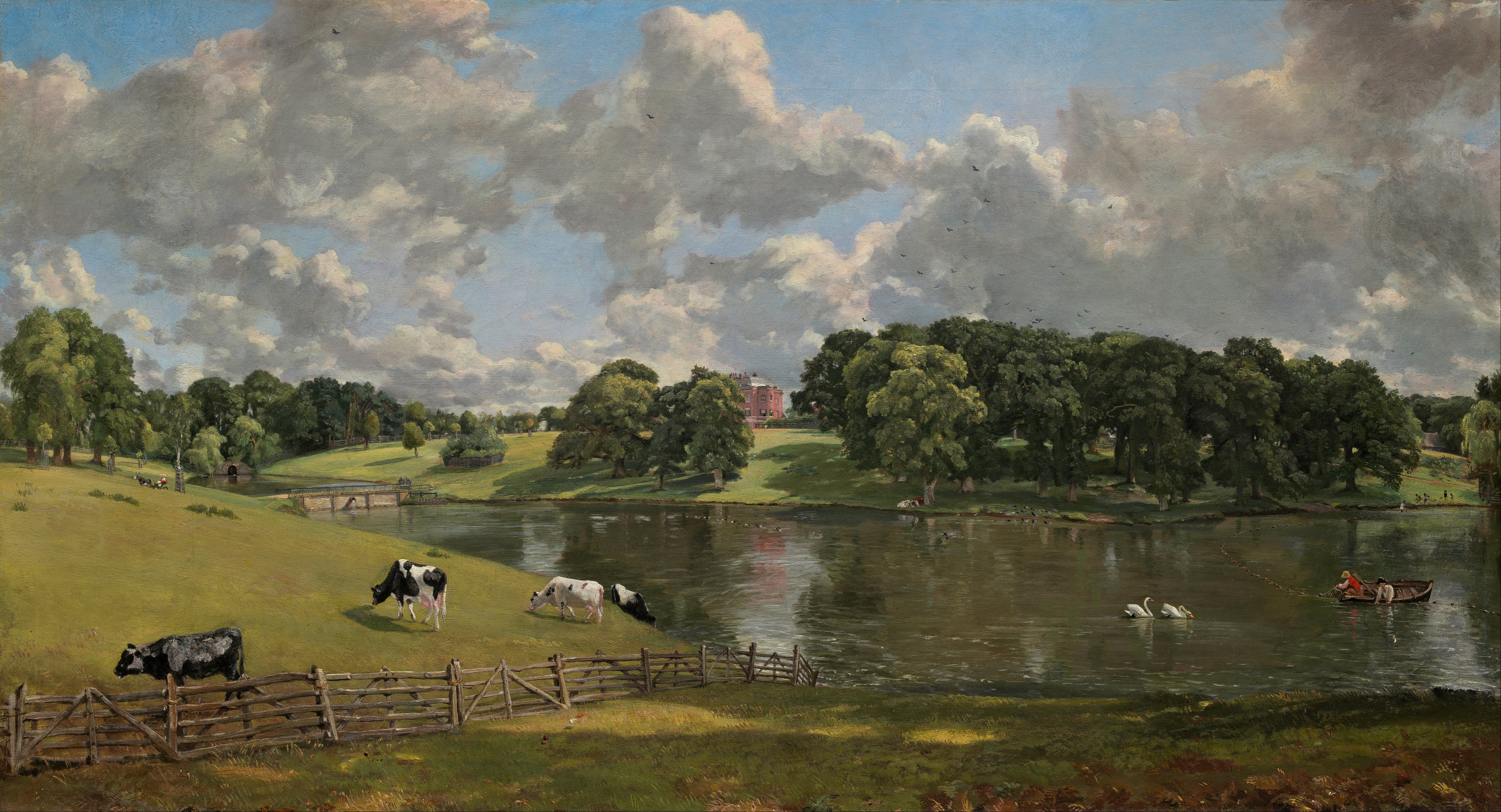
John Constable's Wivenhoe Park, Essex: An idyllic scene featuring trees, grass, and water

Locus amoenus (Latin for "pleasant place") is a literary topos involving an idealized place of safety or comfort. A locus amoenus is usually a beautiful, shady lawn or open woodland, or a group of idyllic islands, sometimes with connotations of Eden or Elysium.

Ernst Robert Curtius wrote the concept's definitive formulation in his European Literature and the Latin Middle Ages (1953).

== Characteristics ==
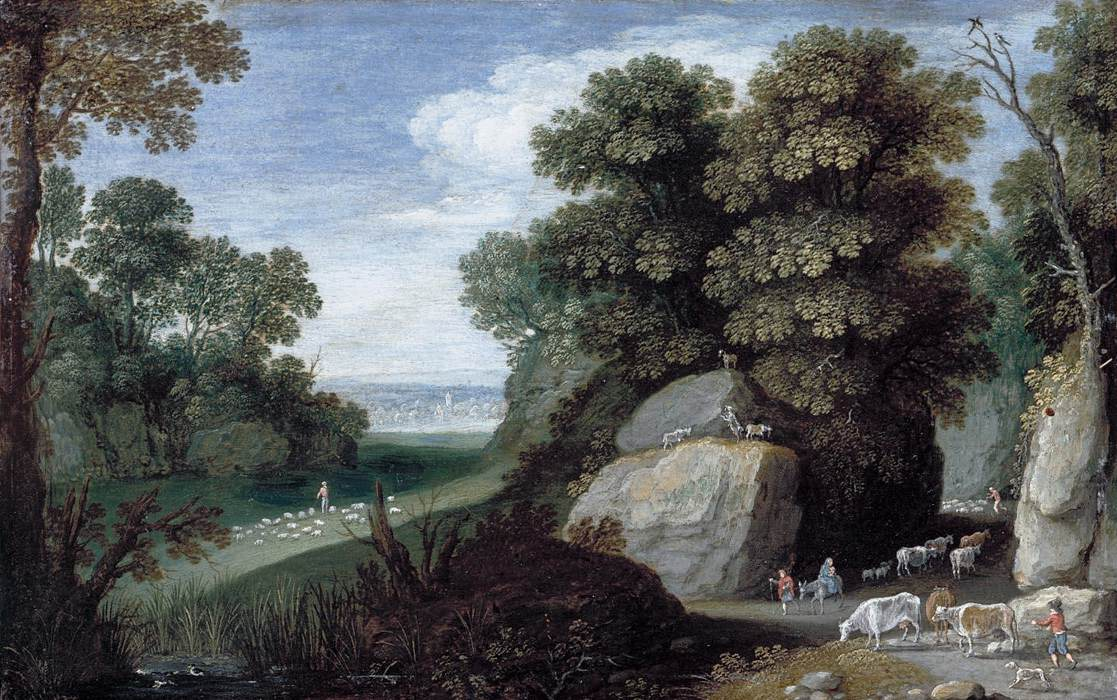
Maerten Ryckaert, Rocky Pastoral Landscape

A locus amoenus will have three basic elements: trees, grass, and water. Often, the garden will be in a remote place and function as a landscape of the mind. It can also be used to highlight the differences between urban and rural life or be a place of refuge from the processes of time and mortality.

In some works, such gardens also have overtones of the regenerative powers of human sexuality marked out by flowers, springtime, and goddesses of love and fertility.

== History ==
=== Classical ===
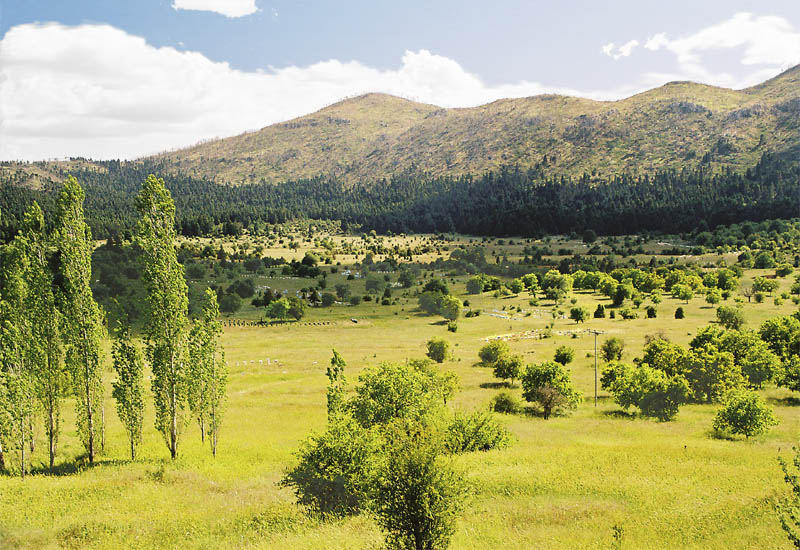
Modern-day Arcadia

The literary use of this type of setting goes back, in Western literature at least, to Homer, and it became a staple of the pastoral works of poets such as Theocritus and Virgil. Horace (Ars Poetica, 17) and the commentators on Virgil, such as Servius, recognize that descriptions of loci amoeni have become a rhetorical commonplace. Arcadia, a rugged region of Greece, was frequently depicted as a locus amoenus whose inhabitants lived in harmony with nature; in time, this usage evolved to describe a broader utopian vision based around simple, pastoral living.

In Ovid's Metamorphoses, the function of the locus amoenus is inverted, to form the "locus terribilis". Instead of offering a respite from dangers, it is itself usually the scene of violent encounters.

=== Medieval ===
The Middle Ages merged the classical locus amoenus with biblical imagery, as from the Song of Songs.

Matthew of Vendôme provided multiple accounts of how to describe the locus amoenus, while Dante drew on the commonplace for his description of the Earthly Paradise: "Here spring is endless, here all fruits are."

=== Renaissance ===
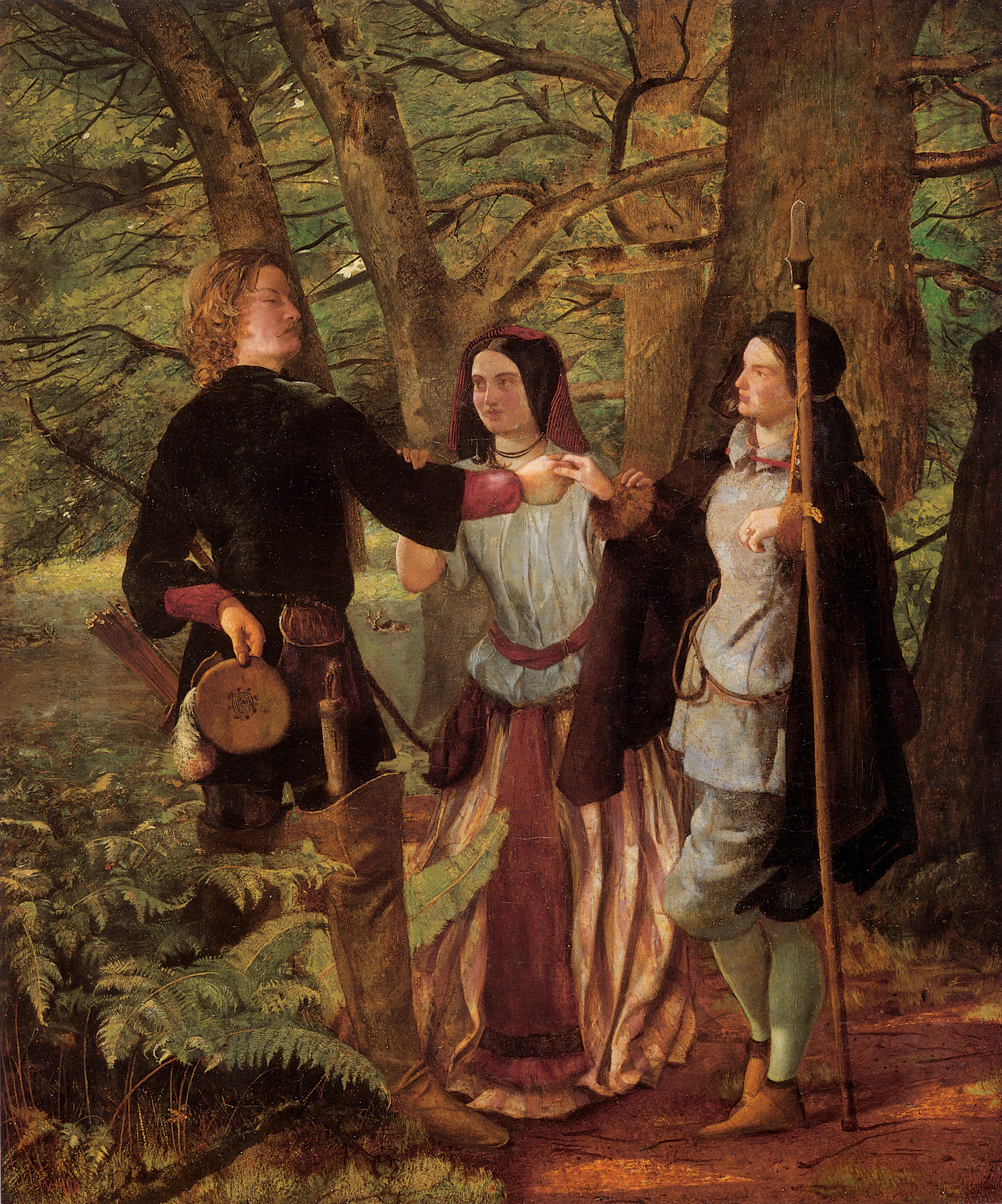
Characters in the Forest of Arden in Shakespeare's As You Like It

The locus amoenus was a popular theme in the works of such Renaissance figures as Ariosto and Tasso.

Shakespeare made good use of the locus amoenus in his long poem Venus and Adonis. The trope also fed into his construction, in many plays, of what Northrop Frye has called the Shakespearean "green world" – a space that lies outside of city limits, a liminal space where erotic passions can be freely explored, away from civilization and the social order – such as the Forest of Arden in As You Like It. A mysterious and dark, feminine place, as opposed to the rigid masculine civil structure, the green world can also be found featured in A Midsummer Night's Dream and Titus Andronicus.

=== Modern ===
In the 20th century the locus amoenus appears in the work of T. S. Eliot, as in the Rose Garden of Burnt Norton and in J. R. R. Tolkien's Shire and Lothlórien.

== Sinister doubles ==
The split-off obverse of the locus amoenus is the apparently delectable but in fact treacherous garden, often linked to a malign sexuality, as in Circe's palace or the Bower of Bliss in Edmund Spenser's Faerie Queene.

== See also ==
- Adonia
- Arcadia (utopia)
- Dream world (plot device)
- Hortus conclusus
- Lost Gardens of Heligan
- The Secret Garden
