= Politics in The Simpsons =

Political themes in animated sitcom

Politics is a common theme in the animated sitcom The Simpsons, and this phenomenon has had some crossover with real American politics. The local politics of the fictional town Springfield feature prominently in many episodes, and character archetypes represent different political concepts within a community. The show satirizes ideas across the political spectrum, though overall it is described as having left-wing and anti-establishment bias. Politicians have been caricatured in many episodes of The Simpsons, including an episode following President George H. W. Bush in response to his public criticism of the show. References to the show also feature in real-world politics. The Simpsons addresses contemporary issues including substance abuse, the economy, education, environmentalism, gun politics, health politics, LGBTQ rights, immigration, and criminal justice. Episodes of the show have also caused international political dispute for its portrayal of foreign countries.

== Political systems ==
The setting of Springfield has developed as a microcosm of local government that can be used by writers and critics to reflect and comment on real-world political issues. The show features the democratic process in local politics, including elections and town hall meetings. National politics of the United States has also been featured on the show. In the season 3 episode "Mr. Lisa Goes to Washington", Lisa visits Washington, D.C. and witnesses a congressman taking a bribe while expressing sexist beliefs. This episode explores faith in democracy, considering both its weaknesses and how it corrects them.

=== Characters ===
The large cast of developed characters makes The Simpsons unique among television shows in its ability to frame complex issues within a community setting. Among the central characters, Lisa Simpson is the most developed politically. She expresses liberal beliefs and support for social justice. Lisa is a vocal advocate of environmentalism, vegetarianism, and feminism. Marge Simpson is portrayed as an overworked housewife associated with conservative ideas of nuclear family and the role of women, though she is also recognized as a feminist within the show. Homer briefly holds political office as Springfield Sanitation Commissioner, during which time he is shown to be a dishonest populist politician who makes promises he cannot fulfill. The season 23 episode "Politically Inept, with Homer Simpson" features Homer as a cable news pundit who supports Ted Nugent for president.

Recurring characters are also used to serve as archetypes for specific political beliefs or are used to explore certain issues. Mayor Quimby is the most prominent politician character in the show, openly engaging in corruption and promiscuity while shirking leadership. Mr. Burns is portrayed as an evil scheming businessman who serves himself ahead of others. Apu Nahasapeemapetilon is a character from India who is used to give the perspective of an immigrant in the United States. Chief Wiggum, the city's chief of police, is portrayed as incompetent and symbolic of police corruption. Ned Flanders, the Simpsons' next-door neighbor, serves as an example of an Evangelical Christian. The character of Flanders is often used to parody excesses of religion, though his friendly demeanor and piety are portrayed positively. Lionel Hutz is used to portray a shyster attorney.

=== Political campaigns ===
Political campaigns and elections are featured in several episodes of The Simpsons. The season 2 episode "Two Cars in Every Garage and Three Eyes on Every Fish" features Mr. Burns running for governor against a popular incumbent with the intention of relaxing safety regulations for his business. The career politician is portrayed as a favorable alternative that cares about the state in comparison to Mr. Burns, who only seeks office for his own benefit. The season 6 episode "Sideshow Bob Roberts" features a mayoral election, pitting incumbent Mayor Quimby against Sideshow Bob, a man who had attempted to kill Bart Simpson. The Simpsons help Quimby in his reelection campaign, but Sideshow Bob is elected. Sideshow Bob uses his political power to make life difficult for the Simpsons, but it is discovered that he won through electoral fraud. The season 9 episode "Trash of the Titans" follows Homer Simpson as he runs for the office of sanitation commissioner, portraying him as an everyman who is unqualified for the role. The season 14 episode "Mr. Spritz Goes to Washington" follows Krusty the Clown as he runs for Congress to fix a local issue through government regulation. In the season 19 episode "E Pluribus Wiggum", Springfield holds the earliest presidential primary, and the town nominates eight-year-old Ralph Wiggum to express their distaste for the ensuing media circus.

== Political stance ==
The Simpsons has been praised for its tendency to satirize ideas across the political spectrum, though the writers have shown support for progressive ideas and some commentators say that the show overall expresses a left-wing bias. It has also been accused of an anti-establishment bias, portraying government and large corporations as evil entities that take advantage of the citizens. In The Simpsons, politicians are often corrupt, Reverend Lovejoy is dismissive to churchgoers, and the local police force is both incompetent and corrupt. Despite this, there have also been occurrences in which career politicians have been portrayed as more competent or reasonable than populist or outsider candidates, such as Homer's opponent when running for sanitation commissioner or Mr. Burns' opponent in a gubernatorial election. Producer Al Jean stated in an interview that "We [the show] are of liberal bent". The show's admitted slant towards liberalism has been joked about in the show, such as in the season 7 episode "The Simpsons 138th Episode Spectacular", in which a reference is made to "hundreds of radical right-wing messages inserted into every show by creator Matt Groening".

== Real-world politics ==
The Simpsons has alluded to politicians throughout its run, sometimes resulting in media attention. Presidents George H. W. Bush and Bill Clinton were both parodied multiple times in the series. The season 8 episode "Treehouse of Horror VII" parodied the 1996 presidential election by presenting both Clinton and Bob Dole as evil alien imposters, insisting that voters must still choose one of them because of a two-party system. The season 11 episode "Bart to the Future" received attention for mentioning a future Trump presidency 16 years before it occurred. Then-incumbent Prime Minister of the United Kingdom Tony Blair voiced himself in a cameo appearance in the season 15 episode "The Regina Monologues". United States Secretary of Commerce Robert Reich appeared as himself in the season 33 episode "Poorhouse Rock". New York mayor Bill de Blasio made two appearances as himself on the show. Arnold Schwarzenegger is portrayed as the president in The Simpsons Movie.

The show has also been referenced in politics. Senator Ted Cruz incorporated references to the show as part of his political identity despite strong backlash from writers and cast members. Secretary of State Mike Pompeo was the subject of controversy after using an image of Lisa Simpson on Twitter in a way that critics said was contrary to the character's beliefs. Several phrases coined by The Simpsons have played a role in political lexicon. "Saying the quiet part loud" was popularized as a political expression following its use in the season 6 episode "A Star Is Burns". The derogatory term for the French, "cheese eating surrender monkeys", has been adopted by conservative personalities, including Jonah Goldberg in particular.

=== George H. W. Bush ===
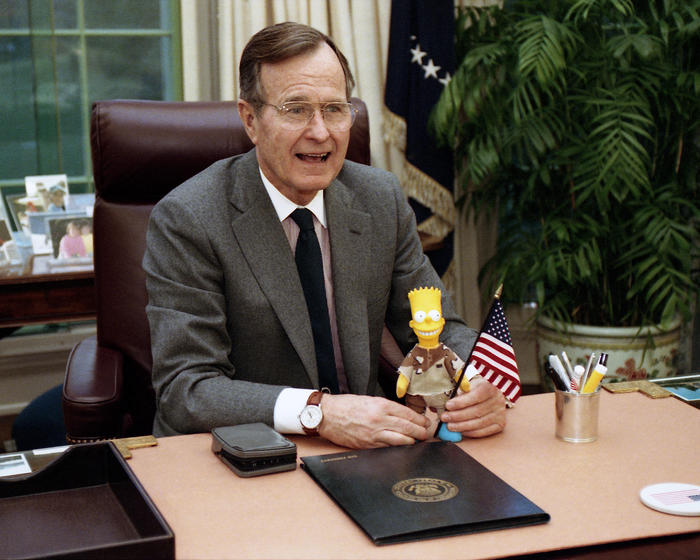
George H. W. Bush with a Bart Simpson doll in 1991

On January 27, 1992, during his re-election campaign, President George H. W. Bush ignited a feud between the Simpsons and the Bushes by referencing the Simpsons in a speech at the National Religious Broadcaster's convention in Washington:

The next value I speak of must be forever cast in stone. I speak of decency, the moral courage to say what is right and condemn what's wrong, and we need a nation closer to the Waltons than the Simpsons. An America that rejects the incivility, the tide of incivility and the tide of intolerance.

— George H. W. Bush

The next broadcast of The Simpsons was a rerun of season 3 episode "Stark Raving Dad". In that broadcast, there was hastily included a new opening which was a response to Bush's speech. The scene begins in the Simpsons' living room. Homer, Patty, and Selma sit on the couch. Maggie is in her high chair next to the couch. Bart and Lisa are sprawled on the carpet. They all stare at the TV and watch Bush's speech. When Bush says, "We need a nation a lot more like the Waltons than the Simpsons", Bart replies "Hey, we're just like the Waltons. We're praying for an end to the Depression, too".

The producers of the show developed their response further by making the season 7 episode "Two Bad Neighbors", which had Bush move into the same neighborhood as the Simpsons. Josh Weinstein said that the episode is often misunderstood. Many audiences expected a political satire, while the writers made special effort to keep the parody apolitical. Bill Oakley stresses that "it's not a political attack, it's a personal attack!", and instead of criticizing Bush for his policies, the episode instead pokes fun at his "crotchetiness".

== Issues ==
=== Constitutional law ===
The Constitution of the United States is the subject of jokes in The Simpsons. The season 7 episode "The Day the Violence Died" includes a parody of Schoolhouse Rock! explaining Constitutional amendments as well as federal copyright law. The season 8 episode "Homer vs. the Eighteenth Amendment" parodies the Prohibition era that began with the ratification of the Eighteenth Amendment. In the season 10 episode "Make Room for Lisa", Homer demonstrates total ignorance of the Bill of Rights, and he loses his Eighth Amendment protections from cruel and unusual punishment after mistakenly wiping the words off of the document. The season 15 episode "Bart-Mangled Banner" features the Simpsons fighting for their First Amendment right to freedom of speech after Bart accidentally moons the flag of the United States. In the season 19 episode "E Pluribus Wiggum", Lisa objects to the presidential nomination of an eight-year-old, but Bart explains that the Constitution no longer applies due to the Patriot Act.

==== Gun rights ====
The theme of gun rights was explored in the season 9 episode "The Cartridge Family". Sam Simon had pitched an episode for one of the first seasons which saw Homer getting a gun and nobody wanting him to have it. The episode concluded with Homer foiling a robbery and stating that although guns bring destruction, it worked for him. However, this episode was pitched by Mike Scully for either season 7 or 8, before being used for season 9. This provided the basic outline, and John Swartzwelder wrote the script. A lot of lines in the episode put guns in a positive light, as the staff felt that they could not just make an episode about how bad they were. Several of the staff are "pro gun", although others such as Matt Groening support "gun control". The episode was designed to be unbiased and portray each side of the argument equally. Scully noted that if there is any message in the episode, it is that a man like Homer should not own a gun. The censors were nervous about some of the episode's subject matter, such as Homer pointing the gun in Marge's face, and Bart aiming the gun at Milhouse Van Houten with an apple in his mouth, but ultimately let it go.

=== Economy ===
Economics and business feature throughout The Simpsons. Many characters engage in business ventures and get-rich-quick schemes, and many episodes focus on how these ventures are economically unsound. The season 4 episode "Marge vs. the Monorail" follows a conman that convinces the town to invest in his monorail against their own interest. The season 5 episode "$pringfield (or, How I Learned to Stop Worrying and Love Legalized Gambling)" addressed the legalized gambling debate, showing the casino as a positive investment in the town but also portraying the harms of problem gambling. The season 14 episode "Mr. Spritz Goes to Washington" follows Krusty the Clown as a Congressional candidate running to solve a negative externality caused by business behavior. The season 19 episode "Husbands and Knives" addresses monopoly and competition when Comic Book Guy abuses his store's lack of competition until a new store is opened to compete.

Several episodes address labor issues at Homer's workplace. In the season 4 episode "Last Exit to Springfield", the employees strike for their dental plan. In the season 17 episode "Kiss Kiss, Bang Bangalore", Mr. Burns relocates the business to India, but he finds the move too expensive after Homer teaches the workers to be lazy. In the season 21 episode "Once Upon a Time in Springfield", Mr. Burns is forced to reinstate the provision of donuts for his employees to retain them.

Taxation features in some episodes. The season 9 episode "The Trouble with Trillions" focuses on taxation and the Internal Revenue Service. In this episode, Homer cheats on his taxes and mistakenly brings an audit upon himself, but he cooperates with the IRS by helping them reclaim money owed by his boss. The two then go to Cuba, where they conclude that the American tax system is better than the alternative. The season 7 episode "Much Apu About Nothing" features a new tax to pay for a bear patrol, but Mayor Quimby blames the tax on illegal immigrants to direct pressure away from himself.

=== Education ===
The Simpsons addresses issues in public schools through its two main school-age characters, Bart and Lisa Simpson, as they attend Springfield Elementary School. Bart is a troublemaker that continually defaces school property, while Lisa is an ideal student that is unsatisfied with her schooling. Teachers in the show are portrayed as incompetent and deeply flawed; they lack faith in the students' capacity and are accordingly uninterested in supporting them. Other students in the school play the roles of simple archetypes, such as Nelson Muntz as the bully, Ralph Wiggum as the dumb student, and Martin Prince as the teacher's pet. The town of Springfield is portrayed as anti-intellectual, and the school is given little support from the community. The school is often a setting for themes of authority and rebellion, with Principal Skinner attempting to keep order in the school amidst Bart's misbehavior. Standardized testing is another common subject of satire in the show. The show also considers many other types of schooling, including preschool, military school, prep school, Catholic school, homeschool, and student-centered gifted school.

The show portrays and satirizes many aspects of school life. The season 2 episode "Lisa's Substitute" features a positive portrayal of a teacher when a substitute teacher inspires Lisa and serves as a positive role model in contrast with Homer. The season 3 episode "Separate Vocations" follows Lisa's declining school performance after a career aptitude test suggests she become a homemaker. She steals the teacher's editions of the school textbooks to prove that the teachers are not capable of teaching without them. The season 6 episode "The PTA Disbands" follows a teacher's strike, presenting the situation as harmful to students when the school is forced to hire unqualified substitutes. The season 17 episode "Girls Just Want to Have Sums" addresses single-sex education and deficiencies in female education.

=== Environmentalism ===
Lisa Simpson is portrayed as an environmental activist. Environmentalism is most prominently addressed in the season 12 episode "Lisa the Tree Hugger", in which she develops a crush on an environmental activist and begins tree sitting. Other episodes centering on her environmentalism include the season 21 episode "The Squirt and the Whale", in which she tends to a beached whale; the season 8 episode "The Old Man and the Lisa", in which she attempts to teach environmentalism to Mr. Burns; and the season 14 episode "'Scuse Me While I Miss the Sky", in which she causes a city-wide power outage to combat light pollution. Her environmentalism is also satirized in one episode in which she and Marge travel to help clean an oil spill in Alaska but flee after discovering that the glamorous jobs are taken by celebrities and finding that the work is unpleasant. The Simpsons Movie focuses specifically on environmentalism, with the plot driven by pollution and the actions of the United States Environmental Protection Agency.

Lisa's environmentalism is portrayed in contrast to apathy or hostility from other characters. In 2019, environmentalist Greta Thunberg's speech to the United Nations was compared to the role of Lisa. The Simpsons has won several Environmental Media Awards for its treatment of the topic. When creating the show, Groening chose to make Homer work at a nuclear power plant to provide opportunity for environmental commentary.

=== Health ===
The Simpsons has made jokes relating to power held by doctors, including one episode in which Dr. Hibbert expresses support for the pharmaceutical industry while wearing merchandise from several major pharmaceutical companies. In the season 4 episode "Homer's Triple Bypass", Homer attempts to defraud a health insurance provider by giving a false report of his medical history, but he has a heart attack while doing so. In the season 13 episode "Sweets and Sour Marge", Marge applies legal pressure to prevent the sale of sugary food in Springfield, but the ruling proves unpopular and turns Marge's family against her. A 2004 study found that about 40 percent of health-related messages on the show reinforce unhealthy behaviors, including messages relating to poor nutrition, harmful body image, improper medical treatment, and drug use.

==== Drugs ====
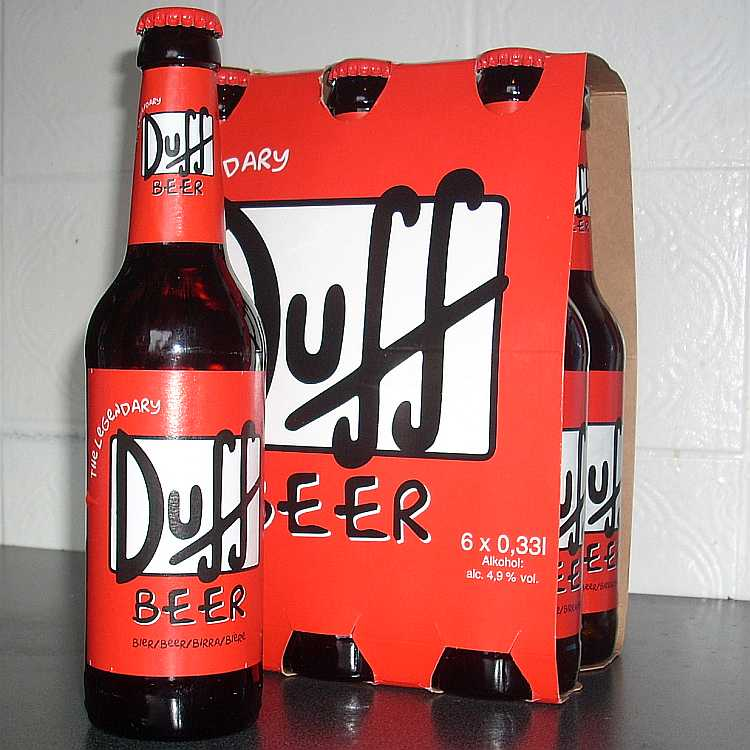
Duff Beer based on the fictional beer brand of The Simpsons

The Simpsons features characters engaging in non-recommended health behaviors related to drugs, such as smoking cigarettes and excessive alcohol consumption. Beer is common in the show, making up about nine percent of all food or drink shown in the first nine seasons. Excessive alcohol consumption is typically portrayed as a source of comedy on the show, though some episodes portray the negative aspects of alcoholism. Alcohol consumption in the show is associated with Moe's Tavern, a common setting in which several working class male characters develop an identity. The season 8 episode "Homer vs. the Eighteenth Amendment" addresses prohibition of alcohol. The town demands the change after Bart Simpson partakes in underage drinking, but it is portrayed as a failure that makes alcohol more widely available through the black market.

The heaviest drinkers among the characters, Homer Simpson and Barney Gumble, are typically portrayed as worse off due to their excessive alcohol consumption. In the season 4 episode "Mr. Plow", it is suggested that Homer caused significant harm to Barney by introducing him to beer. Homer and Barney seek treatment for their alcoholism in the season 4 episode "Duffless" and the season 11 episode "Days of Wine and D'oh'ses", respectively, in which alcoholism is treated as a serious concern. Homer's treatment begins after he is arrested for a DUI, while Barney's begins after he watches a video of how he behaved while drunk.

Cannabis use is portrayed through the stoner character of school bus driver Otto Mann. It was the main focus of the season 13 episode "Weekend at Burnsie's", in which Homer is prescribed medical cannabis. The episode portrays the drug as beneficial to Homer and demonstrates ways in which it improves his life, though he also suffers from short-term memory loss and chooses not to continue use of the drug to set an example for his children. The season 31 episode "Highway to Well" returns to the subject as several characters begin selling legal cannabis.

Several episodes concern prescription drugs. The season 16 episode "Midnight Rx" features characters traveling to Winnipeg to smuggle prescription drugs into the United States. Medication of children is the main focus of the season 11 episode "Brother's Little Helper", in which Bart is made to go on a new ADHD medication against his wishes. The drug is portrayed negatively, culminating in Bart stealing a tank as part of a paranoid delusion, though the episode recognized Ritalin as a legitimate alternative. This plot was revisited in the season 30 episode "Crystal Blue-Haired Persuasion" when Bart has to change his medications.

=== LGBT issues ===
LGBT themes and issues are explored in several episodes. In an interview, Matt Groening expressed his friendship and support to homosexuals, saying that "gay men are starved for positive portrayals of lasting love". The first appearance of a character implied to be gay was in the season 2 episode "Simpson and Delilah", in which the character Karl (voiced by Harvey Fierstein) kisses Homer. The season 8 episode "Homer's Phobia" was the first episode to entirely revolve around homosexual themes. The episode features the gay character John (voiced by John Waters), who is not immediately identifiable as a gay man and does not conform to the typical gay stereotype. After initially being fond of John, Homer acts strongly against him when he finds out about his sexuality. Homer eventually accepts John for who he is. The episode won a GLAAD Media Award, with GLAAD calling the episode "a shining example of how to bring intelligent, fair and funny representations of our community onto television".

Two later episodes that explored LGBT issues were the season 14 episode "Three Gays of the Condo" and the season 16 episode "There's Something About Marrying". The former features Homer's time living with gay roommates, while the latter centered on the right for homosexuals to get married and included Marge's sister Patty coming out as a lesbian. The Gay & Lesbian Alliance Against Defamation described the latter episode as a "ray of light".

The character Waylon Smithers was presumed to be gay for much of the show's run and came out in the season 27 episode "The Burns Cage", in which he briefly dates Julio. Smithers is shown to have a passionate and deep love for Mr. Burns; as late as 2007, during the show's 18th season, Matt Groening and executive producer James L. Brooks wrote in an interview that Smithers, being focused on one particular individual, was not homosexual, but "Burns-sexual". Smithers had expressed feelings for Mr. Burns in several episodes prior to his coming out.

=== Immigration ===
The season 7 episode "Much Apu About Nothing" follows the immigration debate as Mayor Quimby blames higher taxes on illegal immigrants, and the city undergoes a period of xenophobia targeting foreign residents. It demonstrates how the rhetoric and possible deportation affects Apu Nahasapeemapetilon, a character revealed in this episode to be in the United States on an expired visa. The episode presents the issue with a decidedly pro-immigrant stance. The season 20 episode "Coming to Homerica" revisits the immigration debate, with the plot following the residents of Springfield enlisting in a border patrol group and building a border barrier to deny entry to a Norwegian-American community.

=== Justice system ===
The mass appeal of The Simpsons allows it to influence perception of the American legal system by viewers. This may contribute to public misunderstanding and distrust of the legal system, as fictional legal systems are typically portrayed in a way that is inaccurate and disproportionately negative. The show expresses ideas of legal realism, a criticism of the legal system that emphasizes the fallibility of humans. The police department of Springfield is shown to be deeply incompetent and corrupt, with Mayor Quimby at one point handing Chief Wiggum a kickback during a televised press conference. The local news is shown to contribute to criminal issues by feeding mass hysteria. In the season 5 episode "Homer the Vigilante", a citizen's patrol is organized, but it worsens the situation, suggesting that the current police system is superior to the alternative. The show similarly parodies judicial trials and courts. In the season two episode "Bart Gets Hit by a Car", both Mr. Burns and the Simpsons freely make fraudulent claims in court after Burns hits Bart Simpson with his car. In the season 5 episode "The Boy Who Knew Too Much", Bart is forced to consider the moral dilemma of providing testimony, and the judge decides to illegally reopen the trial.

== Foreign relations ==
Several episodes of The Simpsons have caused international controversy for their portrayal of politics in various countries. The season 6 episode "Bart vs. Australia" caused controversy in 1995, featuring the country as a "backward, boorish, alcohol-obsessed nation with criminal tendencies" and including a reference to the death of Azaria Chamberlain. Creator Matt Groening and voice actress Yeardley Smith both apologized for the tone of the episode. The season 16 episode "Goo Goo Gai Pan" features the Simpsons visiting China. The episode is critical of the Chinese government, and it makes multiple references to the 1989 Tiananmen Square protests and massacre. These include a reference to Mao Zedong as "a little angel that killed 50 million people", a scene set up to resemble the Tank Man photo, and a plaque stating "Tien An Men Square: On this site, in 1989, nothing happened" in reference to the Chinese government's censorship of the topic. When Disney+ was released in Hong Kong in 2021, the episode was not made available. The season 10 episode "Thirty Minutes over Tokyo" was not aired on the Japanese network Wowow upon its release in 1999. The episode followed the Simpsons visiting Japan and featured a scene in which Homer engaged in a fight with the Emperor.

=== Argentina ===
The season 19 episode "E Pluribus Wiggum" caused controversy in Argentina prior to its broadcast there. The controversy is over a comment by Carl Carlson, who says, "I could really go for some kind of military dictator, like Juan Perón. When he 'disappeared' you, you stayed 'disappeared!'". Carl's comment is a reference to the Dirty War, a period of military dictatorship during which as many as 30,000 political dissidents disappeared. The clip was viewed on YouTube over 10,000 times in Argentina, and some politicians in the country called for the episode to be censored or banned.

Lorenzo Pepe, former Justicialist Party congressman and president of the Perón Institute, said that "this type of program causes great harm, because the disappearances are still an open wound here". Some reacted negatively to Lenny's response to Carl's comment: "Plus, his wife was Madonna", a reference to the film Evita, where Madonna played Eva Perón. Pepe added that "the part about Madonna—that was too much". Pepe's request for banning the episode was rejected by the Federal Broadcasting Committee of Argentina on freedom of speech grounds. In an unprecedented decision, Fox decided not to air the episode in Latin America; in an e-mail sent later to the media, the network said that this decision was based on "the possibility that the episode would contribute to reopen wounds very painful to Argentina". The Federal Broadcasting Committee made it clear that the episode was not aired in Argentina by Fox's own choice.

=== Brazil ===
In 2002, the Rio de Janeiro tourist board found the season 13 episode "Blame It on Lisa" so offensive to many Brazilian people that they threatened to sue the producers. The board's exact words were: "What really hurt was the idea of the monkeys, the image that Rio de Janeiro was a jungle ... It's a completely unreal image of the city". The Brazilian president at that time, Fernando Henrique Cardoso, found it to be "a distorted vision of Brazilian reality". Rio de Janeiro had just spent millions promoting the city internationally. Producer James L. Brooks apologized to "the lovely city of Rio de Janeiro", adding that "if this does not settle the issue, Homer Simpson offers to fight with the Brazilian president on Celebrity Boxing". After the apology, the issue did not go any further. However, it was international news for a while.

"Blame It on Lisa" has been a source of academic studies in both the United States and Brazil. Alessandro de Almeida of the Federal University of Uberlândia links the depiction of Brazil in the episode with the "social chaos" of Cardoso's second term as president. In his opinion, "the association of the figure of president Fernando Henrique Cardoso with those of the decaying celebrities of Celebrity Boxing is interesting to think about the political meaning of the episode". At that moment, in which Brazil was facing serious social issues due to the Asian financial crisis, "confidence in the Brazilian federal government was severely shaken and the image of the Brazilian president was undoubtedly in decline". He also argues that the episode's criticism "is not focused only in Brazil", citing that while "in the U.S. Bart used to watch violent cartoons, in Brazil he watches 'educational' programs linked to sexuality". The character's escape from reality, according to him, "demonstrates problems of contemporary societies". He concluded his article by saying that the episode could generate a debate about the Cardoso administration that would benefit the Brazilian society, had it not been banned from broadcast television airing by Rede Globo.

=== France ===
"Cheese-eating surrender monkeys", sometimes shortened to "surrender monkeys", is Groundskeeper Willie's insulting phrase referring to the French, which gained notoriety in the United States, particularly in the run-up to the Iraq War. The line was first picked up and used predominantly by Republican politicians and publications. They were led, according to the British national newspaper The Guardian, by Jonah Goldberg, a popular columnist for the U.S. bi-weekly National Review and editor of their website National Review Online. France opposed many U.S. positions and actions, in particular, the 2003 invasion of Iraq. Some argue the phrase's success reflects deep antipathy in the U.S. towards European countries, such as France, that oppose the U.S. in international forums. The New York Post resurrected the phrase "Surrender Monkeys" as the headline for its December 7, 2006, front page, referring to the Iraq Study Group and its recommendation that U.S. combat brigades be withdrawn from Iraq by early 2008.
