= Gravity Falls season 2 =

Season of television show

Gravity Falls
- Season 2
- Promotional poster
- Showrunner: Alex Hirsch
- Starring: Jason Ritter; Kristen Schaal; Alex Hirsch; Linda Cardellini; J. K. Simmons
- No. of episodes: 20

Release
- Original network: Disney XD; Disney Channel
- Original release: August 1, 2014 – February 15, 2016

Season chronology
- ← Previous; Season 1

The second and final season of the American animated mystery comedy television series Gravity Falls was ordered on July 29, 2013. Consisting of 20 episodes, it premiered on Disney Channel on August 1, 2014 and on Disney XD on August 4, 2014, and concluded on February 15, 2016.

== Development ==
=== Premise and plot ===
The second season continues right where the first season stopped. The first 11 episodes mostly focus on Dipper, Mabel, Soos, and Wendy progressing on discovering the identity of the author of the journals, while Stan Pines continues to work on operating the mysterious portal below the Mystery Shack. The last 9 episodes primarily focus on the gang trying to stop Bill Cipher, a dream demon with infinite power who wants to take over the world with weirdness, with J. K. Simmons joining the main cast as Ford Pines.

=== Production ===
On July 29, 2013, the show was revived for a second season. On February 16, 2014, it was announced that Gravity Falls would move from Disney Channel to Disney XD in Spring 2014, and that the second season would be shown on that channel. On March 4, 2014, Alex Hirsch announced on his Twitter account that the second season would premiere in Summer 2014. On June 14, 2014, it was confirmed that Season 2 would premiere on August 1, 2014 on Disney Channel and on August 4, 2014 on Disney XD. On the same day, it was announced that Season 2 would air on both Disney XD and Disney Channel. However, most of the new episodes would premiere on Disney XD before Disney Channel. It was announced that the second season will consist of 20 to 22 episodes.

On November 20, 2015, creator of the show Alex Hirsch announced that the second season would be the show's last and that it was his decision to end the show, not the network's.

== Cast ==
The main characters, voiced by Jason Ritter as Dipper, and Kristen Schaal as Mabel, with series creator Alex Hirsch portraying Grunkle Stan and Soos, and Wendy Corduroy played by Linda Cardellini, reprise their roles. Hirsch also voices Bill Cipher, who returns in the fourth episode, "Sock Opera". J. K. Simmons plays Stan's twin brother, Stanford Filbrick "Ford" Pines, starting with the twelfth episode, "A Tale of Two Stans".

The recurring characters comprises the voices of Dee Bradley Baker as Mabel's pet pig, Waddles, and Hirsch also playing Old Man McGucket, the "local kook" of the town. Kevin Michael Richardson plays Sheriff Blubs, with partner Deputy Durland being voiced by Keith Ferguson. Pacifica Northwest is played by Jackie Buscarino. T. J. Miller plays as Robbie Valentino. Thurop Van Orman voices the recurring villain Li'l Gideon. Voice acting veteran John DiMaggio plays Manly Dan, a strong lumberjack and father of Wendy. Niki Yang and Carl Faruolo play Candy Chiu and Grenda, Mabel's two best friends, respectively. Toby Determined, a journalist for Gravity Falls' Gossiper, is voiced by Gregg Turkington, and Will Forte plays Tyler Cutebiker.

== Broadcast ==
For this season, the show broadcast most of its original episodes on Disney XD, with Disney Channel airing reruns, although "Scary-oke" and "Little Gift Shop of Horrors" aired on Disney Channel first. The season premiered on Disney Channel Europe, Middle East and Africa on December 3, 2014. It also airs on Disney XD Canada with differently assigned numbers: "Northwest Mansion Mystery" is counted 11 instead of 10, "Not What He Seems" is counted 10 instead of 11, "The Last Mabelcorn" is counted 17 instead of 15, "Dipper and Mabel vs. the Future" is counted 16 instead of 17, and "Weirdmageddon 3" is counted 24 instead of 20.

== Episodes ==
- Production codes for this season start with the string 618G-2 (the first three numbers numerically represent the birth month and date of series creator Alex Hirsch), with the last two numbers representing the order the episodes were produced in, which may not represent the order in which they air.
- The viewership of the episodes are given from the channel in which aired the episode first.
- Episode 10 has been released on different platforms under two names: "Northwest Mansion Mystery" and "Northwest Mansion Noir".

No. overall	No. in season	Title	Directed by	Written by	Original release date	Prod. code	U.S. viewers (millions)
21	1	"Scary-oke"	Rob Renzetti	Matt Chapman, Alex Hirsch & Jeff Rowe	August 1, 2014 (Note: This episode premiered on Disney Channel prior to Disney XD. The episode premiered on Disney XD on August 4, 2014.)	202	2.37
Stan continues to work on the portal while the Mystery Shack throws a grand re-opening party after the Li'l Gideon incident. Meanwhile, when Dipper meets two government agents, he tries to tell them about the mysteries of Gravity Falls by showing them his journal. When the agents don't believe anything written in the journal, Dipper ends up conjuring up zombies as proof, causing more trouble. Guest stars: Nick Offerman as Agent Powers and Brad Abrell as Agent Trigger
22	2	"Into the Bunker"	Joe Pitt	Matt Chapman & Alex Hirsch	August 4, 2014	201	0.94
Dipper's journal pages lead the gang to the author's hidden bunker where they find themselves face-to-face with an evil shapeshifter whom the author studied. Meanwhile, Dipper finds himself struggling to build up the courage to finally tell Wendy how he feels about her. Guest star: Mark Hamill as The Shape Shifter
23	3	"The Golf War"	Matt Braly	Alex Hirsch & Jeff Rowe	August 11, 2014	203	1.27
After being belittled by Pacifica one too many times, Mabel challenges her to a miniature golf-off, which gets out of control when she and Dipper discover that living golf balls control the courses. Guest stars: Patton Oswalt as Franz, Frank Caliendo as Sergei, Nathan Fillion as Preston Northwest, John O'Hurley as Knight Lilliputtian, Jim Cummings as Pirate Lilliputtian, John Roberts as Xyler, and Greg Cipes as Craz
24	4	"Sock Opera"	Matt Braly & Joe Pitt	Alex Hirsch & Shion Takeuchi; Additional written material by: Zach Paez	September 8, 2014	206	0.87
Mabel attempts to make the perfect sock puppet show to impress her new crush. Meanwhile, Dipper tries to figure out the password to the laptop found in the bunker, while Bill Cipher wants to make a "deal" with him. Guest star: Jorma Taccone as Gabe Bensen
25	5	"Soos and the Real Girl"	Matt Braly	Alex Hirsch & Mark Rizzo	September 22, 2014	205	0.84
After Soos promises his grandmother to find a date for his cousin Reggie's engagement party, Dipper and Mabel offer to help him. Eventually, he uses a Japanese visual novel dating simulator to help him talk to girls. However, Giffany, the girl in the game, obsessively falls in love with Soos and eventually reveals herself as a sentient, malicious, and extremely jealous yandere AI after Soos asks Melody, a girl who works at a meat stand, for a date. Meanwhile, Stan plans to steal a kiddie robot for the Mystery Shack. Guest stars: Jillian Bell as Melody, Jessica DiCicco as Giffany, Paul Scheer as Gary, and Brian Bloom as Rumble McSkirmish
26	6	"Little Gift Shop of Horrors"	Stephen Sandoval	Matt Chapman, Alex Hirsch & Shion Takeuchi; Additional written material by: Zach Paez	October 4, 2014 (Note: This episode premiered on Disney Channel prior to Disney XD. The episode premiered on Disney XD on October 6, 2014.)	209	2.31
In this non-canon episode, Stan tries to sell Mystery Shack merchandise to an unknown buyer by telling stories about each item he sells.: Hands Off: After stealing her gold watch, Stan is cursed by a witch and loses his hands.; Abaconings: Waddles becomes smart after consuming a mysterious mushroom, and begins bonding more with Dipper than Mabel.; Clay Day: Dipper, Stan, and Soos try to help Mabel confront her fear of stop motion animation, only to face off against real clay monsters.; Guest star: Neil deGrasse Tyson as "smart" Waddles
27	7	"Society of the Blind Eye"	Sunil Hall	Matt Chapman & Alex Hirsch; Additional written material by: Zach Paez	October 27, 2014	207	1.07
When Dipper, Mabel, Soos, and Wendy confront Old Man McGucket about his connection to the author of the journals, they discover a secret society in Gravity Falls that erases people's memories of the supernatural. Guest star: Peter Serafinowicz as Blind Ivan Note: This episode features an Easter egg crossover with Rick and Morty, via a pen, notepad, and mug, which previously emerged from a portal in the Rick and Morty first season "Close Rick-counters of the Rick Kind" (which aired almost seven months earlier, on April 7, 2014), in this episode being accidentally dropped through the other end of the same portal by Stan Pines.
28	8	"Blendin's Game"	Matt Braly	Alex Hirsch & Jeff Rowe	November 10, 2014	208	0.78
Blendin challenges Dipper and Mabel to a futuristic, deadly battle for revenge of his past humiliation. Meanwhile, Dipper and Mabel learn that Soos doesn't like his birthday and use the time travel situation to figure out why. Guest stars: Justin Roiland as Blendin Blandin, Dave Wittenberg as Time Baby and Lolph, and Diedrich Bader as Dundgren
29	9	"The Love God"	Sunil Hall	Alex Hirsch & Josh Weinstein	November 26, 2014	210	0.82
Mabel takes matchmaking too far when she steals a love potion from a real Love God to use on Robbie and Tambry. Meanwhile, Stan decides to create a hot air balloon for the Woodstick music festival. Guest stars: John DiMaggio as Love God and Jillian Bell as Melody
30	10	"Northwest Mansion Mystery"	Matt Braly	Alex Hirsch, Mark Rizzo & Jeff Rowe	February 16, 2015	211	1.17
The Northwests hire Dipper to deal with a ghost that threatens to disrupt their party, teaming up with Pacifica, but he soon finds out the Northwests' secret. During the party, Candy, Grenda, and Mabel fight over a boy they all want to date. Guest stars: Nick Offerman as Agent Powers, Brad Abrell as Agent Trigger, and Nathan Fillion as Preston Northwest
31	11	"Not What He Seems"	Stephen Sandoval	Matt Chapman, Alex Hirsch, Jeff Rowe, Shion Takeuchi & Josh Weinstein; Additional written material by: Zach Paez	March 9, 2015	212	1.58
After government agents take Stan into custody, Dipper and Mabel begin to question how much they really know about their Grunkle and must work out whether or not they truly trust him anymore. Guest stars: Nick Offerman as Agent Powers and Brad Abrell as Agent Trigger
32	12	"A Tale of Two Stans" (Note: The runtime of this episode is 29 minutes long, rather than the usual length of 22 minutes.)	Sunil Hall	Matt Chapman, Alex Hirsch & Josh Weinstein	July 13, 2015	213	1.91
Stan is reunited with his long-lost twin brother, Stanford "Ford" Pines, the author of the journals. Stan and Ford proceed to reveal their history to Dipper, Mabel, and Soos, and what led to them drifting apart. Guest stars: Nick Offerman as Agent Powers, Brad Abrell as Agent Trigger, and Jonathan Banks as Filbrick Pines
33	13	"Dungeons, Dungeons & More Dungeons"	Stephen Sandoval	Matt Chapman, Alex Hirsch & Josh Weinstein; Additional written material by: Zach Paez	August 3, 2015	214	1.22
Dipper ends up discovering a common interest with Ford in playing their favorite board game, "Dungeons, Dungeons, and More Dungeons". When Stan accidentally rolls Ford's Infinity-Sided Dice, the characters from the game come to life and capture Dipper and Ford, forcing Stan, Mabel, and Grenda to play the game to rescue them. Game parody to Dungeons & Dragons, D&D for short. Guest star: "Weird Al" Yankovic as Probabilitor
34	14	"The Stanchurian Candidate"	Matt Braly	Alex Hirsch, Jeff Rowe & Josh Weinstein; Additional written material by: Mike Rianda	August 24, 2015	213	1.16
When Stan decides to run for mayor, Dipper and Mabel use a controlling tie to make him a better candidate. Meanwhile, Gideon returns and uses his own form of mind control to have his father run for mayor. Guest star: Cecil Baldwin as Tad Strange
35	15	"The Last Mabelcorn"	Matt Braly	Alex Hirsch	September 7, 2015	222	0.84
Mabel and her friends go on a magical quest to get unicorn hair in order to protect the Mystery Shack from Bill Cipher. Meanwhile, Dipper uncovers the truth behind Ford and Bill's prior relationship, and the true meaning behind the portal. Guest star: Sam Marin as Celestabellebethabelle
36	16	"Roadside Attraction"	Sunil Hall	Alex Hirsch, Jeff Rowe & Josh Weinstein	September 21, 2015	217	0.91
Stan brings the kids on a road trip to ruin every other tourist trap in Oregon. Meanwhile, Dipper tries to get more crushes in an effort to get over Wendy. Guest star: Chelsea Peretti as Darlene
37	17	"Dipper and Mabel vs. the Future"	Stephen Sandoval	Matt Chapman, Alex Hirsch & Josh Weinstein; Outline by: Alex Hirsch & Mark Rizzo	October 12, 2015	218	0.94
Mabel begins planning her and Dipper's 13th birthday party, while Ford needs Dipper's help in sealing up the interdimensional rift. While Dipper becomes closer with Ford, Mabel becomes further stressed in regards to growing up, and potentially being separated from her brother. Guest star: Justin Roiland as Blendin Blandin
38	18	"Weirdmageddon Part 1" (Note: Titled "Xpcveaoqfoxso" in subsequent airings.)	Sunil Hall	Alex Hirsch & Josh Weinstein	October 26, 2015	219	1.41
Bill Cipher has been freed, and unleashes an apocalypse upon Gravity Falls as his minions run rampant through the town. With Ford captured and the journals destroyed, Dipper's only hope is to rescue Mabel. Guest stars: Louis C.K. as The Horrifyingly Sweaty One-Armed Monstrosity, (Note: As of December 21, 2017, Louis C.K. has been dubbed out of this role for future airings due to his sexual harassment allegations. Series creator Alex Hirsch redubbed this character and is credited for doing so at the end of the re-dubbed rerun.) Danielle Fishel as Pyronica, Patrick McHale as Hectorgon, Andy Merrill as Teeth, Brian Bloom as Rumble McSkirmish, Nathan Fillion as Preston Northwest, Justin Roiland as Blendin Blandin, and Dave Wittenberg as Time Baby and Lolph Note: Jason Ritter and Linda Cardellini briefly appear as Dipper and Wendy, respectively, in a live-action shot.
39	19	"Weirdmageddon 2: Escape from Reality"	Matt Braly	Alex Hirsch & Jeff Rowe	November 23, 2015	220	1.67
Dipper, Soos, and Wendy enter Mabel's bubble to rescue her, only to discover it is her own personal paradise. Meanwhile, Bill discovers something is keeping him and his minions trapped in the town. Guest stars: Jon Stewart as Judge Kitty Kitty Meow Meow Face-Schwartstein, John Roberts as Xyler, Greg Cipes as Craz, Danielle Fishel as Pyronica, Patrick McHale as Hectorgon, Eric Bauza as Ernesto, and Alfred Molina as the Multi-Bear
40	20	"Weirdmageddon 3: Take Back the Falls" (Note: This episode is a one-hour special. Since its original airing, this episode has sometimes been split up into two separate episodes, with the first maintaining the original title, while the second is titled "Weirdmageddon 4: Somewhere in the Woods"; the splitting is also observed on Disney+.)	Stephen Sandoval	Alex Hirsch, Shion Takeuchi, Mark Rizzo, Jeff Rowe & Josh Weinstein	February 15, 2016	221/223	2.47
Dipper and Mabel rally the surviving townsfolk to fight against Bill Cipher and his minions in one final stand to save Gravity Falls from destruction. Guest stars: Nathan Fillion as Preston Northwest, Larry King as Wax Larry King, Alfred Molina as Multi-Bear, Cecil Baldwin as Tad Strange, Danielle Fishel as Pyronica, Andy Merrill as Teeth, Louis C.K. as The Horrifying Sweaty One-Armed Monstrosity, and Kyle MacLachlan as Bus Driver

== Reception ==
The season received widespread acclaim from critics.

Review grades
No.	Title	Air date	The A.V. Club (A-F)
1	"Scary-oke"	August 1, 2014	B+
2	"Into the Bunker"	August 4, 2014	A
3	"The Golf War"	August 11, 2014	B
4	"Sock Opera"	September 8, 2014	A
5	"Soos and the Real Girl"	September 22, 2014	B-
6	"Little Gift Shop of Horrors"	October 4, 2014	A-
7	"Society of the Blind Eye"	October 27, 2014	A-
8	"Blendin's Game"	November 10, 2014	A-
9	"The Love God"	November 26, 2014	B+
10	"Northwest Mansion Mystery"	February 16, 2015	A-
11	"Not What He Seems"	March 9, 2015	A
12	"A Tale of Two Stans"	July 13, 2015	A
13	"Dungeons, Dungeons, & More Dungeons"	August 3, 2015	B+
14	"The Stanchurian Candidate"	August 24, 2015	B
15	"The Last Mabelcorn"	September 7, 2015	A-
16	"Roadside Attraction"	September 21, 2015	A-
17	"Dipper and Mabel vs. the Future"	October 12, 2015	A-
18	"Weirdmageddon Part 1"	October 26, 2015	A
19	"Weirdmageddon 2: Escape from Reality"	November 23, 2015	A-
20	"Weirdmageddon 3: Take Back the Falls"	February 15, 2016	A
