= Danny Malin =

English YouTube personality

- Born: November 1979 (age 46); Barnsley, South Yorkshire, England
- Spouse: Sophie Mei Lan (m. 2023)
- Partner: Carrie Taylor (died 2021)

YouTube information
- Channels: Rate My Takeaway; Mr and Mrs Yorkshire
- Years active: 2020–present
- Genre: Food reviews
- Subscribers: 785 thousand (Rate My Takeaway); 25 thousand (Mr and Mrs Yorkshire)
- Views: 197 million (Rate My Takeaway); 2.4 million (Mr and Mrs Yorkshire)
- Last updated: 8 July 2025

Danny Malin (born November 1979) is an English YouTube personality and food critic. He is the former host of the YouTube series Rate My Takeaway, in which he visited and reviewed takeaway food shops, mainly in Northern England, although some reviews included London, New York, Los Angeles, Las Vegas and various cities in Scotland, Wales and Ireland. Rate My Takeaway had over 785,000 subscribers and more than 197 million views from its beginning in June 2020 until Malin left in September 2025.

Malin has also featured as a regular speaker on the British daytime television show Steph's Packed Lunch.

In December 2021, Malin released a charity single titled "Santa's Takeaway" in a bid to get the Christmas number one single. The Trussell Trust and Mind were the charities to benefit.

In September 2024, Malin opened a food hall called the 'Rate My Takeaway Kitchen' in the Packhorse Centre in Huddersfield

In September 2025, Malin left the Rate My Takeaway channel, citing behind the scenes difficulties with the degeneration of the relationship between him and the team that made the videos and the toll that had on his health.

In 2026, Malin began a new food review YouTube channel Danny vs Food.

== Format ==
Malin began each show with the greeting, "Now then guys, how ya doin'? Back on the road again!" He then announces the city and takeaway shop he will be visiting, with his "cameraman", occasionally his editor (who speaks to Danny when he is present) filming the journey. Upon arrival, Malin takes a folding table and folding chair from the boot of his car and proceeds to the shop. After engaging with the counter staff, he will order several courses then set up his table and chair outside the shop. When the meal arrives, he will taste and comment on each course. Finally, when he rates the takeaway, he ends it with a comment in his characteristically strong accent, such as, "If I'm honest wi' yer, it's a solid nine from me."

Businesses have reported a surge in business following reviews by Malin.

As Malin's popularity increased, his reviews were often interrupted by fans seeking a chat or a selfie.

Malin had used the same camping chair for all his broadcasts. However, during the episode that aired on 10 January 2022, the chair broke after a safety pin snapped on it causing Malin to fall down. The broken chair was subsequently sold for charity on the internet auction site eBay. The money raised would go to the buyer's charity of choice. The highest bid exceeded £50,000 but the bid was not honoured.

== United States tour ==
In August 2022, Rate My Takeway embarked on a tour of the United States. Destinations for reviews included New York, Las Vegas and Los Angeles.

As part of the tour, Malin met up with long-time fan of the show Josh Weinstein, who was a writer of The Simpsons. They had a chat over a burger and fries at Marina del Rey, California.

== Personal life ==
Malin was born in Barnsley. He then resided in Morley, Leeds, West Yorkshire, for 13 or 14 years, some of which he worked at a butcher's shop in Kirkgate Market. His longtime partner Carrie Taylor died suddenly of a heart attack in February 2021. They had two children, and Carrie had a son from a previous relationship. In December 2022, Malin announced his engagement to journalist Sophie Mei Lan. Malin married Mei Lan in June 2023 in Yorkshire. They had a daughter in September 2023. He runs a joint YouTube channel with his wife called Mr and Mrs Yorkshire where he and Mei Lan film vlogs together around Yorkshire. As of April 2025, they have over 15.4k subscribers.

In 2022, Malin became a silent business partner in Brody's burger restaurant in Pudsey, which is now permanently closed.

In February 2024, Malin had two strokes in two weeks and was later diagnosed with a blood clot on the brain.

In January 2026 Danny and Sophie announced via the Mr and Mrs Yorkshire channel that they are expecting a second child in July 2026.
