= A Tale of Two Stans =

- Gravity Falls episode
- Episode no.: Season 2 Episode 12
- Directed by: Sunil Hall
- Written by: Josh Weinstein; Matt Chapman; Alex Hirsch
- Editing by: Kevin Locarro
- Production code: 618G-213
- Original air date: July 13, 2015
- Running time: 29 minutes

Guest appearances
- Nick Offerman as Agent Powers; Brad Abrell as Agent Trigger; Jonathan Banks as Filbrick Pines; J. K. Simmons as Stanford "Ford" Pines; Declan J. Krogman as Young Stanley; Christian Mardini as Young Stanford

Episode chronology
← Previous "Not What He Seems"	Next → "Dungeons, Dungeons & More Dungeons"
- Gravity Falls season 2

"A Tale of Two Stans" is the twelfth episode of the second season of the American animated television series Gravity Falls, which was created by Alex Hirsch, and the 32nd episode overall. It was written by Josh Weinstein, Matt Chapman, and Hirsch, and directed by Sunil Hall, and originally aired on Disney XD on July 13, 2015.

"A Tale of Two Stans" immediately follows the previous episode with Stan's long lost twin brother (J. K. Simmons) exiting the portal. Their reunion quickly sours, prompting Stan (Hirsch) to explain his backstory to Dipper (Jason Ritter), Mabel (Kristen Schaal) and Soos (Hirsch). Meanwhile, government agents scour the Mystery Shack looking for Stan and the portal.

The episode is notable for its 29-minute runtime as opposed to the average 21-22 minutes per episode.

== Writing ==
According to Alex Hirsch, "A Tale of Two Stans" was one of the most difficult episodes to write as the backstory had to be plausible.

== Plot ==
Stan approaches to greet his twin brother emerging from the portal. (Note: As depicted in "Not What He Seems".) The two instead fight until Mabel intervenes. Stan introduces his family to each other, revealing his true name to be Stanley after taking "Stanford" from his brother (nicknamed Ford). Above ground, the Mystery Shack is surrounded by government agents. While Ford prevents the agents from finding the portal, Stan narrates their family history to Dipper, Mabel and Soos.

As children, Stan was troublesome and although Ford was highly intelligent, he was bullied due to having six fingers on both hands. The brothers supported each other in their ostracization. In high school, Ford invented a perpetual motion machine that could grant him entry into a prestigious university but Stan later broke the machine in a jealous rage. The Pines family disowned Stan who vowed to become rich by himself. However, all his business ventures failed and he forged identities after getting banned in multiple states.

Ford eventually graduated college and used his research grant to study the anomalies of Gravity Falls. He built a cabin there and noted his findings in three journals. Later, Ford theorized that the town's anomalies may originate from another dimension. To test this theory, he contacted his friend Fiddleford McGucket to help build a portal. But after a disastrous test, McGucket implored Ford to destroy the machine before quitting the project.

Wary of his colleague's warnings, Ford contacted Stan after a decade but only to give him the first journal and have it hidden far away. Outraged by his brother's lack of desire to reconcile, Stan threatened to destroy the journal until Ford seized it from him. Their struggle reactivated the portal; Stan accidentally pushed Ford into it before the machine shut down. Stan spent the next three decades trying to reopen the portal but was only able to after collecting all three journals. To make ends meet and provide a cover story in the meantime, Stan assumed his brother's identity, faked his own death, and transformed Ford's cabin into the Mystery Shack.

In the present, Ford sends away the government agents by wiping their memories. The brothers have an uneasy reunion where Stan allows Ford to stay in the basement for the rest of the summer but forbids him from talking to the twins. Mabel overhears their conversation, worried that she and Dipper might become like their great-uncles, but Dipper assures her otherwise.

== Broadcast ==
The episode was viewed by 1.91 million viewers and received a 0.4 18-49 rating on Disney XD, a new record for the network, until "Weirdmageddon 3: Take Back the Falls", the series finale, broke the record seven months later.
