= Politically Inept, with Homer Simpson =

10th episode of the 23rd season of The Simpsons

- The Simpsons episode
- The opening titles of Homer's show
- Episode no.: Season 23; Episode 10
- Directed by: Mark Kirkland
- Written by: John Frink
- Production code: PABF03
- Original air date: January 8, 2012

Guest appearance
- Ted Nugent as himself

Episode features
- Chalkboard gag: "Tintin did not sucksuck"
- Couch gag: In an Edwardian era setting, the lights go out and there is a gunshot. When the lights come up, Homer is found dead and Bart is arrested for his father's murder. Marge (the real culprit) hides the smoking gun in her hair.

Episode chronology
← Previous "Holidays of Future Passed"	Next → "The D'oh-cial Network"
- The Simpsons season 23

"Politically Inept, with Homer Simpson" is the tenth episode of the twenty-third season of the American animated television series The Simpsons. In the episode, Bart uploads a video on YouTube in which Homer rants about airlines' horrible treatment of passengers. It quickly goes viral and Homer is eventually given his own political cable news show. Homer wins support among average Americans and is chosen by the Republicans to pick their candidate for the next presidential election. He chooses Ted Nugent, but in the end, he realizes that he made the wrong decision, so he admits on television that he is "full of crap".

American musician and conservative political activist Ted Nugent made his second guest appearance on The Simpsons in this episode, which makes fun of his views on hunting and gun ownership.

The episode has received generally positive reception from television critics and has been particularly praised for its satire of politics and cable news commentators. During its original broadcast on the Fox network in the United States on January 8, 2012, "Politically Inept, with Homer Simpson" was watched by about 5.07 million people and received a 2.3 Nielsen rating.

== Plot ==
After a series of demeaning check-in procedures, the Simpsons board an Air Springfield plane for their trip to the wedding of a relative in Montana. The pilot announces that owing to an unforeseen jailbreak in New South Wales, the trip will be delayed. He tells the travelers that because the plane is still on the ground, he will turn off the ventilation system. However, the odor of meals eaten by some of the passengers cause many to begin to feel ill. Seven hours pass and the pilot makes another announcement that the plane is going to taxi back to the gate and remain there for an unknown amount of time and that the passengers cannot get off. When Homer is forbidden from using the bathroom by the air hostess, his anger boils over and he rants about the airline's horrible treatment of its passengers. Bart records a video of Homer running amok and then escapes from the plane via the wing. He uploads it on YouTube and it quickly becomes popular.

Homer is invited to speak his mind on a popular cable news show called Head Butt, on which host Nash Castor and commentator Adriatica Vel Johnson argue that he will soon be forgotten. However, Homer makes a convincing rant in which he tells the viewers that unlike television blowhards such as Nash and Adriatica, he speaks for the common man. When the show is over, the cable network executives give Homer his own television show called Gut Check with Homer Simpson, where he provides a mix of populist and conservative ideas. During one episode, he pours "gravy of freedom" over a steak shaped like America, using the gravy as a metaphor for the things that make the country great. He then encourages his viewers to "get on the boat" to protest about the bad things in society and proceeds to place a gravy boat on his head. This wins Homer a huge base of support among average Americans, and soon the "gravy boat movement" becomes popular throughout the country.

When Homer is chosen by the Republicans to pick their candidate for the next presidential election, his lack of interest in the current candidates leads him to choose Ted Nugent. He invites Nugent for a visit to the Simpsons' home, where Lisa complains that Homer has made the wrong pick since Nugent is "out of his mind". Later that day, Homer has a dream in which James Madison shows him how ashamed past American presidents are of Homer. When he wakes up, he tells Lisa he will not be supporting Nugent for president anymore. He then sees a brochure on her dresser with a man posing as a president and offering help with fake dreams. Homer realizes the family faked his dream to convince him not to endorse Nugent. As a result, he angrily decides to go on television and express his support for Nugent. However, when he tries to bring out his ability to cry every time he discusses anything on television, he finds he cannot bring up those emotions because he does not truly believe in what he is saying. Homer announces on television that he "is full of crap" and reconciles with Lisa. As a result, Nugent is stripped of his position as the Republican presidential candidate. The episode ends as he sings a song about what his presidency would have been like.

== Production and themes ==
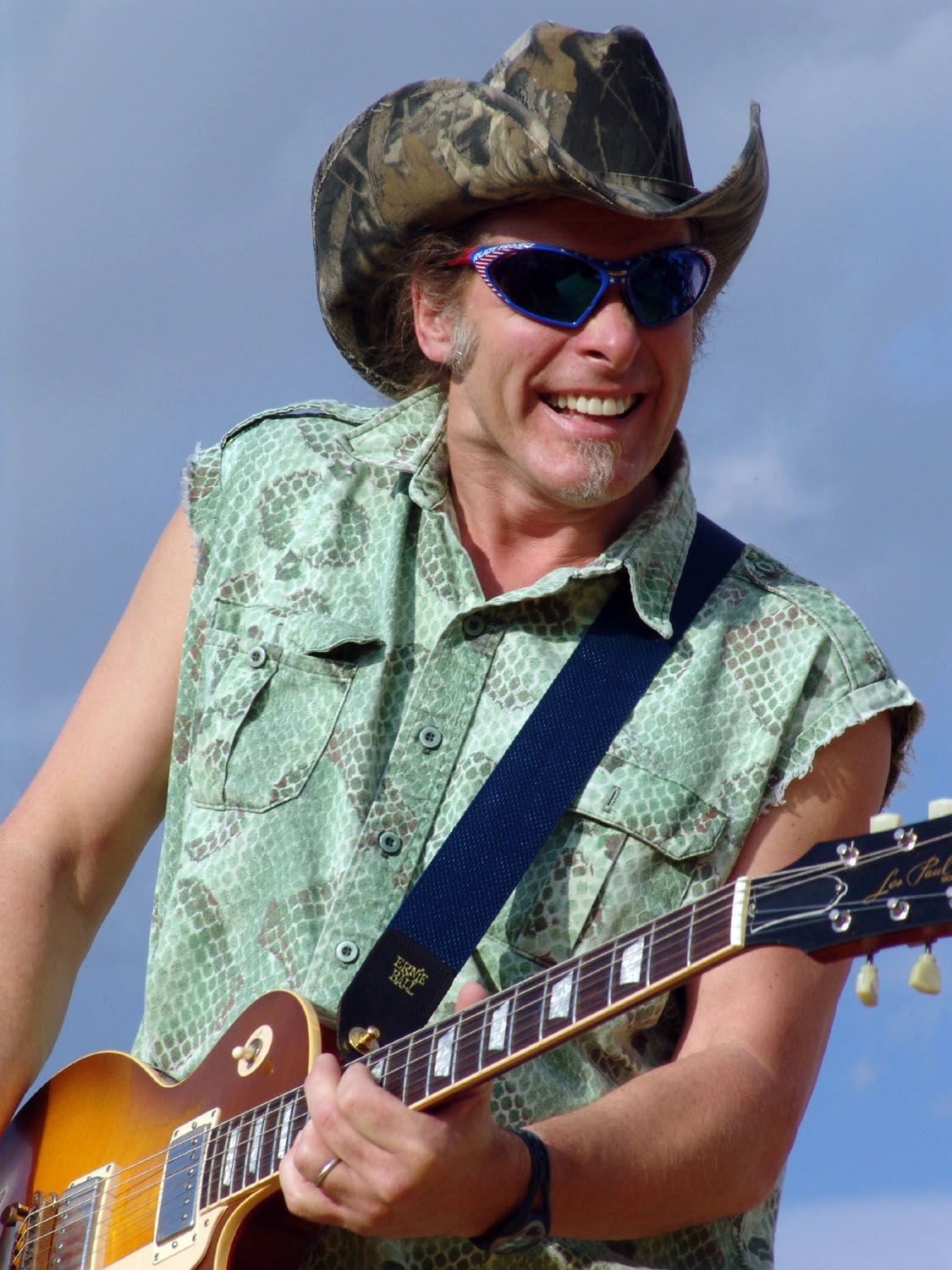
Musician and political activist Ted Nugent guest-starred in the episode as himself.

The episode, titled "Politically Inept, with Homer Simpson", was written by John Frink and directed by Mark Kirkland. American musician and conservative political activist Ted Nugent guest starred in the episode as himself, providing his voice for both speaking and singing parts. His song at the end of the episode is similar to his single "Cat Scratch Fever". According to Noisecreep's Kenneth Partridge, the episode makes fun of Nugent's "blatantly pro-gun, pro-hunting, anti-everything-liberals-hold-dear persona". The episode features, among other things, Nugent throwing a dead elk onto the dinner table at the Simpsons' home, as well as using some of Bart's school friends as arrows for his bow. Nugent had previously made a minor cameo in the season nineteen episode "I Don't Wanna Know Why the Caged Bird Sings" (2007). In that episode, his voice is heard in a phone call urging people to vote no on a proposition that would make crossbows illegal in public schools. He comments, "If we outlaw crossbows, who's gonna protect our children from charging elk?"

"Politically Inept, with Homer Simpson" satirizes the television industry. It parodies political television shows from cable news channels such as MSNBC, CNN, and Fox News Channel that are similar to Gut Check with Homer Simpson. In an article, Mediaite's James Crugnale commented that Homer's personality as he hosts his show is a reference to conservative political commentator Glenn Beck's "over-the-top persona", and wrote that "In a spot-on, cheeky parody of Beck, Homer ostentatiously sobs crocodile tears as he laments a high school in Nebraska replacing football with soccer as a team sport." Adriatica Vel Johnson, the commentator on the political show that Homer first appears on, is a parody of commentator Arianna Huffington.

In addition, the episode satirizes American politics and includes several references to the 2012 Republican Party presidential primaries. For example, when Homer appears on Head Butt, the news ticker features headlines such as "Gingrich looks forward to winning... his fourth wife", "Rick Perry mistakenly signs order to execute himself", and "Satan tweets support for Santorum". At one point in the episode, the character Ned Flanders comments that he supports Nugent "as long as he isn’t a Mormon", which is a reference to Mitt Romney. Hayden Childs of The A.V. Club wrote in a review that Homer's political movement "is clearly a parody of the Tea Party", noting that "as with the teabags of the teabagger movement, people everywhere are moved to wear gravy boats on their heads [in the episode]." Childs further mentioned that a follower of Homer holds a sign that references the Occupy movement, which he thought was "a token of the show’s desire to be an equal opportunity offender."

== Release ==
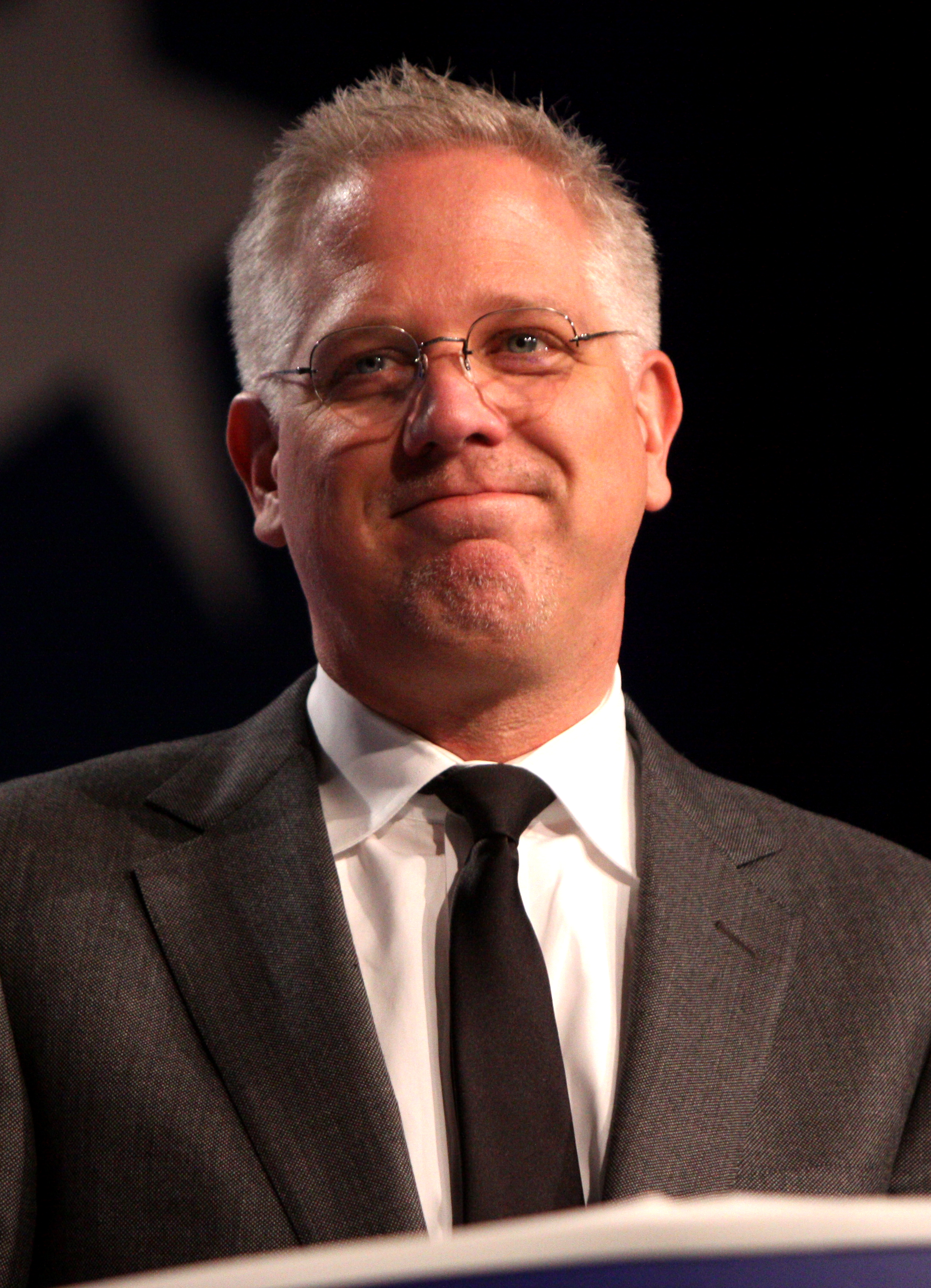
The episode has been praised for parodying cable news personalities such as commentator Glenn Beck.

The episode originally aired on the Fox network in the United States on January 8, 2012. It was watched by approximately 5.07 million people during this broadcast, and in the demographic for adults aged 18–49, it received a 2.3 Nielsen rating and a five percent share. The rating was a twenty-three percent decrease from the previous episode, "Holidays of Future Passed"; however, much of "Politically Inept, with Homer Simpson" faced strong competition from the end of a highly rated National Football League playoffs game on CBS. The episode became the second highest-rated broadcast in Fox's Animation Domination lineup for the night in terms of both total viewers and adults aged 18–49.

Since airing, "Politically Inept, with Homer Simpson" has received generally positive reception from critics.

Steve Newton of The Georgia Straight called it "one of the funniest Simpsons I've seen in a while", and David Crawford of Radio Times wrote that the satire "may not be subtle, but it is sharp and the jokes come tumbling one after another."

In an article about the episode, Mediaite's James Crugnale commented that "The Simpsons' writers have outdone themselves tonight, with this no-holds-barred parody of the over-the-top bloviating shenanigans of some cable news personalities."

Hayden Childs of The A.V. Club thought it was a "solid episode" that peaked in the middle with the satire of politics. He had mixed feelings about the first part of the episode revolving around airline travel, criticizing the fluctuating quality of the jokes. He wrote that "writer John Frink is able to draw out some moderately amusing gags among a few stinkers." Childs further criticized Nugent's guest appearance in the third act, noting that it "falls flat when the show cannot decide how to mock [Nugent] without really offending him," and the fake dream sequence, which he described as "unfunny and sitcommy". He concluded that "The Simpsons has done plenty of political satire over the years and still may never improve over season six’s 'Sideshow Bob Roberts'. The middle section of this episode had moments that were in the same league, though".

In February 2012, "Politically Inept, with Homer Simpson" was listed by Matt Zoller Seitz of New York magazine as one of "Nine Latter-Day Simpsons Episodes That Match Up to the Early Classics".

== See also ==
- Politics in The Simpsons – Political themes in animated sitcom
