= That Darn Katz! =

- Futurama episode
- Episode no.: Season 6 Episode 8
- Directed by: Frank Marino
- Written by: Josh Weinstein
- Production code: 6ACV08
- Original air date: August 5, 2010

Episode features
- Opening caption: (Or similar product)
- Opening cartoon: "Scotty Finds a Home" (1935)

Episode chronology
| ← Previous "The Late Philip J. Fry" | Next → "A Clockwork Origin" |
- Futurama season 6

"That Darn Katz!" is the eighth episode in the sixth season of the American animated television series Futurama, and the 96th episode of the series overall. It first aired on Comedy Central on August 5, 2010. In the episode, Amy's rejected doctoral dissertation—a device to harness the Earth's rotational energy—is used by evil invading space cats to fix their own slowing planet. Since the invention will cause the Earth to stop turning, Amy and Nibbler must team up to stop them while their co-workers have fallen under the thrall of the cats' cuteness.

The episode was written by Josh Weinstein and directed by Frank Marino. This was the first episode since "Rebirth" to use the full intro sequence, and as a result, includes a classic cartoon before the opening credits. "That Darn Katz!" was generally well received by critics, who enjoyed another unexpected pairing, this time between Amy and Nibbler, and the character development for both that arose from it.

== Plot ==
Amy prepares to defend her doctoral dissertation in Applied Physics: a machine capable of harnessing the Earth's rotation and magnetic field to produce energy. Nibbler confronts Leela, displeased with her treatment of him as a pet and desiring to be treated as a crewmember.

At Amy's defense her proposal is rejected, mostly due to Professor Katz' pet cat, who distracts her and stimulates her allergy to cats. The crew return to Planet Express, unknowingly accompanied by the cat. The crew—with the exception of Amy, who remains resentful, and Nibbler, who is jealous of Leela's affection for the cat—finds the cat endearing. Amy and Nibbler become suspicious, rationalizing that no creature could behave so cute without an ulterior motive. They discover that Professor Katz was a puppet controlled by his cat, Katz, the entire time, who is part of an alien race of talking cats that invaded Earth during 3500 BC in ancient Egypt. The space cats' home planet, Thuban 9, began losing its rotation, and they discovered that Earth had the correct orientation and magnetic field to harness its rotational energy. They built the Great Pyramid of Giza—an energy transfer antenna—and planned to send Earth's energy to Thuban 9, but became distracted by their worship by the Egyptians, forgetting their technology over the centuries. Amy's thesis provided the cats with their lost technology, allowing them to begin again. Katz and his colleagues place the crew under their influence with "hyper-cuteness", forcing them to build Amy's invention.

Imprisoned by the space cats, Amy and Nibbler watch helplessly as the device stops the Earth. Katz transfers the stored rotational energy to Thuban 9 and departs, leaving the Earth in disarray and freeing the crew from their hypnosis. Earth begins burning on its sun-exposed face while the opposite face freezes. The crew attempt to reverse the machine and restore Earth's rotation, but find it can only turn in one direction. Lamenting that her invention doomed Earth, Amy realizes that by continuing to turn it, they can restart the Earth's rotation, albeit in the opposite direction. The plan works and the machine reclaims Earth's rotational energy from Thuban 9, now spinning in the opposite direction. In recognition of her achievement, Amy receives her doctorate, now "Doctor Wong". She remains with Planet Express because the job market is poor while Nibbler reconciles with Leela, appreciating that she cares for him.

== Production ==
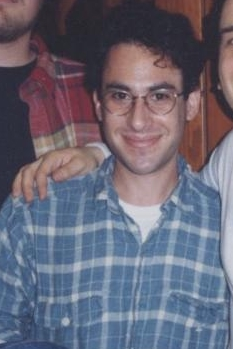
Josh Weinstein wrote the episode, his first for the series.

The episode was written by The Simpsons veteran Josh Weinstein and directed by Frank Marino. Weinstein had previously worked as a show runner for The Simpsons along with his writing partner Bill Oakley during seasons seven and eight. "That Darn Katz!" marks the first episode written by Weinstein, who had previously served as a consulting producer for Futurama since 2001.

== Cultural references ==
The episode largely references the Lolcat phenomenon, imitating posters and phrases such as "I Can Has Cheezburger?".

== Broadcast and reception ==
"That Darn Katz!" originally aired on August 5, 2010 on Comedy Central and was viewed by an estimated 1.950 million viewers receiving a 1.3 rating/2% share in the Nielsen ratings and 1.0 rating/3% share in the 18-49 demographic, going down slightly from the previous week's episode.

The episode received mostly positive reviews from critics. Zack Handlen of The A.V. Club enjoyed the episode, rating it an A−, stating that the jokes were strong throughout the episode. Handlen felt the episode was "a return to pure wackiness" and found it a nice change of pace from the more emotional issues of the season. He particularly praised the season's continuation of unlikely pair-ups in Nibbler and Amy, feeling that both received good character development from the episode. Danny Gallagher of TV Squad gave the episode a positive review, also praising the focus on Amy away from her relationship with Kif and the exploration of Nibbler's relationship with Leela. Alex Zalben of UGO.com likewise enjoyed the use of both characters, feeling that "it paid in such great character dividends. Amy manages to prove she’s not just a bunch of eye candy, and Nibbler finds out it’s not so bad to be cared for by Leela after all." He concluded that "['That Darn Katz!'] may not have pulled on the heart strings like the last two episodes, but this one was firing on all cylinders – and we need episodes like this, just silly larks about cats taking over the world, to give us breathing time between the crying jags." Though he was disappointed with the episode's plot similarities to season three's "The Day the Earth Stood Stupid", IGN critic Robert Canning rated the episode 8/10. He felt that the episode's cuteness and funny moments allowed him to "forgive this small weakness." Sean Gandert of Paste rated the episode 9.3/10 and called it an "instant classic", particularly praising the character development for Amy and Nibbler.

Merrill Barr of Film School Rejects gave the episode a more mixed review, calling it "[a] very well structured episode of Futurama despite it not being that funny." He stated that the episode lacked the laughs of previous episodes, but felt that overall it was better than the first five episodes of the season.
