= Not What He Seems =

- Gravity Falls episode
- Episode no.: Season 2 Episode 11
- Directed by: Stephen Sandoval
- Written by: Shion Takeuchi; Josh Weinstein; Jeff Rowe; Matt Chapman; Alex Hirsch
- Editing by: Kevin Locarro
- Production code: 618G-210
- Original air date: March 9, 2015
- Running time: 22 minutes

Guest appearances
- Nick Offerman as Agent Powers; Brad Abrell as Agent Trigger

Episode chronology
← Previous "Northwest Mansion Mystery"	Next → "A Tale of Two Stans"
- Gravity Falls season 2

"Not What He Seems" is the eleventh episode of the second season of the American animated television series Gravity Falls, which was created by Alex Hirsch, and the 31st episode overall. The episode was written by Shion Takeuchi, Josh Weinstein, Jeff Rowe, Matt Chapman, and Hirsch, and directed by Stephen Sandoval. In this episode, Dipper and Mabel begin to question who Stan really is after officers arrest him for stealing chemical waste. The episode, which breaks the show's status quo by introducing Stan's long-lost twin brother, ends with a cliffhanger to the second half of the season.

"Not What He Seems" was first broadcast on March 9, 2015 on Disney XD, and was watched by 1.58 million households in the United States. It was the biggest broadcast ever for Gravity Falls during its run on Disney XD until the following episode, "A Tale of Two Stans", beat that record four months later. The episode received positive reviews from critics, with praise to the story, character work, and animation. The episode was nominated for multiple Annie Awards, while storyboard artist Alonso Ramirez Ramos was nominated for an Emmy Award.

== Plot ==
=== Background ===
While Dipper and Mabel Pines are spending their summer in the town of Gravity Falls, their great uncle Stan has been working on an unknown machine in his basement underneath the Mystery Shack, trying to make it work without them knowing about his doings.

=== Synopsis ===
In the underground laboratory, Stan successfully refuels the portal and times its full activation. Gravity anomalies occur throughout Gravity Falls at the same time as a side effect, causing people and objects to briefly levitate before falling down.

The next morning, Stan spends time with Dipper and Mabel before he is ambushed by a team of law enforcement officers led by Agent Powers and Agent Trigger. Powers arrests Stan for allegedly stealing toxic waste and harboring a doomsday weapon; Stan pleads innocence and the twins defend him but are taken by Agent Trigger for transfer to child protective services. After escaping Trigger’s car, Dipper and Mabel return to the Mystery Shack convinced that the security camera footage would clear Stan’s name. Instead, they discover Stan was indeed transporting stolen toxic waste into the Shack. Moreover, they find a box containing fake IDs, a newspaper clipping reporting Stan’s supposed death, and a code to a hidden door in the vending machine. There, they confront Soos who was tasked by Stan to guard the door but is pushed aside after a brief struggle. The twins unlock the door and with Soos they descend into a secret laboratory where they find the portal as well as the other two journals. When combined, all three journals form a blueprint for the portal but under his blacklight, Dipper unveils a message in invisible ink warning that the machine could destroy the universe.

Meanwhile, Stan takes advantage of a gravitational pulse to escape Agent Powers. As Dipper prepares to override the portal, Stan arrives to stop him. Another anomaly occurs and lifts everyone off the ground. Mabel manages to hold onto the lever that would complete the process but is convinced by Stan not to pull it. The machine fully activates, engulfing Gravity Falls in a flash of light before ceasing all anomalies. An unknown man emerges from the portal whom Stan reveals to be the author of the journals: his twin brother.

A mid-credits scene shows Stan and his twin brother as children at a beach, sitting quietly on a swing set while looking out onto the ocean.

== Production and themes ==
In this episode [Stan's] secret double life finally catches up with him, and it puts the pressure on the kids to sort of figure out if they're going to rescue their uncle from what's going on here. The question is, does he deserve rescuing? What did he do? Is he a good guy at all?

— Hirsch regarding the episode

"Not What He Seems" is the eleventh episode of the second season of Gravity Falls, created by Alex Hirsch. He wrote it with Matthew Chapman, Jeff Rowe, Shion Takeuchi, and Josh Weinstein. It is the second episode to be directed by Stephen Sandoval. The final sequence revealing Ford was animated in-house by storyboard artist Dana Terrace, with Matt Braly providing key animation.

The episode, which halves the second season, ends with a cliffhanger to the second half of the season. The writers did this so a hiatus would fit and they could write the episode sooner. According to Hirsch, half the fandom of Gravity Falls had guessed Stan had a brother—revealed in the episode as the author of the three journals Dipper, Stan, and Gideon own—before the episode aired. In particular, fans wrote "Zapruder film"-level exposés in the form of "PowerPoint presentations, flow charts, timelines", rare for a Disney Channel show. Hirsch had the character in his pitch of the show to the network, with the writers placing clues of his existence from the first episode. Still, he and the writers took this element as a risk, and Hirsch said that the ending would be shocking to some. They found it necessary in the end to keep the characters interesting and break the status quo. Calling Gravity Falls about characters "first and foremost", Hirsch said that would be Mabel forgiving of Stan, while Dipper would be unforgiving of both Stan and himself, for the rest of the season. With Dipper, Hirsch described Stan being a con as "a huge blow to his ego, a huge betrayal, and I think it will leave him feeling isolated from his family in a way he hasn't been before".

The episode guest stars Nick Offerman as Agent Powers; he had previously appeared in the season opener "Scary-oke" and the episode "Northwest Mansion Mystery". Hirsch described this character, in addition to Agent Trigger, as plot devices to divide the protagonists and have them face their allegiances to one another.

== Broadcast and reception ==
On its original airdate, 2.06 million people (and 1.02 million on the Internet) viewed "Not What He Seems", the most received by any series broadcast on Disney XD.

Alasdair Wilkins of The A.V. Club praised the episode, highlighting how the episode utilized the relationships between Dipper, Mabel, and Stan to craft its narrative. He also praised the episode's character work, comedy, and art-style, describing the episode as an "instant classic". Vrai Kaiser of The Mary Sue described the episode as the best of the series. Kaiser highlighted the episode's utilization of color contrasts to emphasize its tone, as well as describing how it turned the viewer's "assumptions of safety" about the series "on its head".

Storyboard artist Alonso Ramirez Ramos was nominated for an Emmy Award for his work on the episode. The episode was additionally nominated for two Annie Awards in the "Best Animated Television/Broadcast Production for Children" and "Writing in an Animated Television/Broadcast Production" categories.
