= The Golf War =

- Gravity Falls episode
- Episode no.: Season 2 Episode 3
- Directed by: Matt Braly
- Written by: Jeff Rowe; Alex Hirsch
- Production code: 618G-202
- Original air date: August 11, 2014
- Running time: 22 minutes

Guest appearances
- Nathan Fillion as Preston Northwest; Frank Caliendo as Sergei; Patton Oswalt as Franz; John O'Hurley as Knight Lilliputtian; Jim Cummings as Pirate Lilliputtian; John Roberts as Xyler; Greg Cipes as Craz

Episode chronology
← Previous "Into the Bunker"	Next → "Sock Opera"
- Gravity Falls season 2

"The Golf War" is the third episode of the second season of the American animated television series Gravity Falls, which was created by Alex Hirsch, and the 23rd episode overall. It was written by Jeff Rowe and Hirsch, and was directed by Matt Braly. The episode features Mabel Pines challenge her arch-rival Pacifica Northwest to a mini golf match, with Mabel hiring small golf ball-headed beings called Lilliputtians to foil Pacifica's game.

The episode premiered on Disney XD on August 11, 2014, and garnered 1.27 million viewers when it premiered.

== Plot ==
When Mabel fails to get her fashion article featured on the local newspaper front page, Dipper brings her to a mini golf course where Mabel demonstrates her talent at the sport. After missing the final hole, she is bested by her rival Pacifica Northwest whom she challenges to a match later that night.

During Mabel's practice before the match, Dipper senses movement from one of the miniature windmills. Inside are small golf ball-headed people called Lilliputtians who secretly control the golf course. Factions exist between each themed hole claiming theirs to be the best; they ask Mabel to arbitrate and she promises to award a gold sticker to the faction that sabotages Pacifica the best. The match begins upon Pacifica's arrival with her referee Sergei. With help from the Lilliputtians, Mabel wins each hole with ease but when she suggests a possible winner, the Dutch-themed faction moves to kidnap Pacifica in an attempt to gain the twins' favor. At the final hole, they tie Pacifica to a windmill designed to kill her. Mabel decides to end the competition by eating the gold sticker. Betrayed, the Lilliputtian factions unite against the humans who escape on a golf cart and accidentally leave behind Sergei.

Mabel apologizes to Pacifica for cheating and offers her a ride home in Stan's car. Pacifica initially refuses until it suddenly rains. At the end of the trip, she gains a new respect for Mabel saying that she enjoyed their match. In a mid-credits scene, the Lilliputtians entertain Sergei whom they have kept hostage.

== Production ==
The episode was written by Gravity Falls creator Alex Hirsch and Jeff Rowe. In addition, the episode was directed by Matt Braly.

== Critical reception ==
Alasdair Wilkins of The A.V. Club awarded the episode a "B", saying that while the episode represented Gravity Falls at its "absolute weirdness", the episode did not have the tone to keep up the "weirdness".
