= Trash of the Titans =

- The Simpsons episode
- Promotional card, featuring Homer, U2, and Ray Patterson, a character voiced by Steve Martin
- Episode no.: Season 9 Episode 22
- Directed by: Jim Reardon
- Written by: Ian Maxtone-Graham
- Production code: 5F09
- Original air date: April 26, 1998

Guest appearances
- Steve Martin as Ray Patterson; U2 as themselves; Marcia Wallace as Edna Krabappel; Paul McGuinness as himself; Susie Smith as herself

Episode features
- Chalkboard gag: "I will not mess with the opening credits" (during the couch gag)
- Couch gag: Homer, Marge, Lisa and Maggie appear in Edna Krabappel's classroom, where Bart is writing on the blackboard: "I will not mess with the opening credits".
- Commentary: Matt Groening; Mike Scully; George Meyer; Ron Hauge; Ian Maxtone-Graham; Yeardley Smith

Episode chronology
← Previous "Girly Edition"	Next → "King of the Hill"
- The Simpsons season 9

"Trash of the Titans" is the twenty-second episode of the ninth season of the American animated television series The Simpsons. The 200th episode of the series overall, it originally aired on Fox in the United States on April 26, 1998. The episode, which was written by Ian Maxtone-Graham and directed by Jim Reardon, sees Homer Simpson run for the job of Springfield's Sanitation Commissioner. Steve Martin guest stars as Ray Patterson, the incumbent commissioner, while U2 play themselves after requesting an appearance on the show.

Inspired by a friend's experience in politics, Maxtone-Graham decided to have Homer run for Sanitation Commissioner, although one draft of the episode saw him running for mayor. The staff also wanted the episode to be about trash, and created the concept of "Love Day" as a means of generating waste. The episode's resolution was discussed extensively by the staff, with one proposed idea being that Springfield would be raised up and the excess rubbish swept underneath it. The episode also features a parody of the song "The Candy Man" and an incident involving comedian Redd Foxx.

"Trash of the Titans" won an Emmy Award for Outstanding Animated Program (For Programming One Hour or Less), something the staff believe was due to the environmental message at the end.

The episode is dedicated to the memory of Linda McCartney, who appeared alongside her husband Paul in the episode "Lisa the Vegetarian."

== Plot ==
Local department store Costington's launches a new August holiday called Love Day intended to boost summer sales. The Simpsons celebrate it, but the vast amount of packaging and unwanted gifts it produces causes the garbage to build up. When Homer overloads the trash and is forced to take it out, he fails to make it to the curb in time. As the garbage men drive away without collecting his trash, Homer angrily shouts insults at them, causing a fight that leads to the family's garbage service being cut off. Garbage gradually piles up on their front lawn and despite Marge's pleas, Homer refuses to apologize to the garbage men.

Homer awakens one morning to find the pile of trash gone and believes he has beaten City Hall, only to learn that Marge wrote a letter of apology to the Springfield Sanitation Commissioner Ray Patterson, forging Homer's signature. Outraged, Homer goes to see Patterson, demanding the letter be returned. Patterson does so and tries to be civil with Homer, but Homer insists he will fight the department and decides to run for Commissioner.

Homer's campaign starts badly with him being beaten up after interrupting U2's PopMart Tour concert. However, after bartender Moe suggests that Homer use his off-hand comment of "Can't someone else do it?" as a slogan, Homer's campaign picks up after a populist rebranding. Spreading his message to the town, he promises expensive services such as round-the-clock garbage service and sanitation workers doing all possible household cleaning, as well as providing garbage men with stylish new uniforms. During a town hall debate, Homer belittles Patterson to the amusement of the assembled townspeople (as well as possibly tampering with the brakes of Patterson's car).

After Patterson rhetorically asks Springfieldians to decide between his record of public service and Homer's corruption and incompetence, Homer wins a landslide victory in the election. Whilst clearing out his office, Patterson warns Homer that he will "crash and burn". After being sworn in, Homer shows his plans by singing a parody of "The Candy Man" entitled "The Garbage Man."

However, fulfilling these promises proves costly and Mayor Quimby reprimands Homer for spending the department's annual budget in only a month. Homer gets cities all over the United States to pay him to store their excess garbage in an abandoned mine shaft on the outskirts of Springfield. Despite the budget crisis having ended and the workers receiving their salaries as promised, the garbage builds up underground and eventually erupts, pouring trash all over the town. At a town hall meeting, Homer is removed from office and ordered to be horsewhipped and replaced with Patterson, who declines reinstatement and relishes the disastrous consequences of the town's decision to elect Homer over him. With no other options left, Quimby moves the entire town five miles down the road. However, Lisa worries that such a drastic move will make no difference if the same lackadaisical attitude towards waste management continues. Homer nonchalantly throws away a bag of potato chips, and it lands next to a Native American, who sheds a tear before being warned by a fellow tribe member not to turn around. He does so anyway, and screams out loud on seeing Springfield's former site, which is now swamped with garbage for miles around.

During the credits, U2 is flying to their next stop on the tour when bassist Adam Clayton shows off his Springfield souvenir spoon to Bono and The Edge. Clayton hands Bono the spoon, who throws it behind them. The spoon hits Mr. Burns on the head, who proceeds to call the band "wankers".

== Production ==
The production team wanted the episode to be about trash, and show runner Mike Scully pitched the idea that Homer should run for office. Writer Ian Maxtone-Graham had a friend who had made their way in Chicago politics, through the Sanitation Commission, and so he decided that Homer should run for Sanitation Commissioner. They then spent much time trying to get to the point that Homer would have an "over-filled trash can," and through its extensive use of packaging, the concept of Love Day was formed. Originally the episode saw Homer running for mayor, but this idea was abandoned. The ending was talked about for a while, with the original idea being that the whole town would be raised up and the rubbish be swept underneath. The ending was not intended to carry an environmental message, but it played well and is what the staff believe won the episode an Emmy. In a July 28, 1997 interview with USA Today, Scully remarked that it was chosen to be the 200th episode of the series since, "I thought it had all the elements of what The Simpsons does best: corporate satire, political satire, a production number, a great story with Homer, and the family is involved. It seemed to represent a lot of what we do, so I decided to hold it until May." In this interview, Scully hinted that the episode would feature a "big-name movie star and a big-name rock band", adding that these guest stars could not be announced at this stage because it hadn't been recorded yet.

U2 contacted the show about doing a guest spot, rather than the other way around. The writers immediately wrote them one, in case they changed their minds. They recorded their lines for the episode in October 1997. The band's head of Principal Management Paul McGuinness and Susie Smith, an employee of Principal Management, also make brief appearances in the episode. U2's drummer Larry Mullen, Jr. appears in the episode, although he has no dialogue. Steve Martin guest stars as Ray Patterson.

The episode marked the first appearance of Costington's department store, whose slogan is "Over a Century Without a Slogan." It took "a lot of wasted man-hours" to come up with both the name and slogan.

== Cultural references ==
The episode's title references the 1981 film Clash of the Titans. "The Garbage Man" song is a parody of "The Candy Man" from Willy Wonka & the Chocolate Factory. During "The Garbage Man", Oscar the Grouch appears. The name Sir Loves-a-Lot is a reference to Sir Lancelot. When U2 is introduced in the episode their song "Pride (In the Name of Love)" is performed. The song is dedicated to Martin Luther King, Jr., who was assassinated in Memphis, TN in 1968 while supporting the Memphis sanitation strike.

Ray Patterson (Steve Martin) leaves the stage to the Sanford and Son theme music, in the reference to the Redd Foxx incident

The scene where Ray Patterson is reinstated (to which he enters and exits to the Sanford and Son theme song) was a reference to a moment that occurred during a stand-up show of comedian Redd Foxx. During a show in Las Vegas, Redd Foxx came on stage to the Sanford and Son theme song, only to find that there were a handful of people in the audience. Foxx angrily stated that he wasn't going to perform with such a small audience and walked off stage. The house orchestra, puzzled by Foxx's behavior, simply played him off with the Sanford and Son theme song again. The same incident was the basis for a joke in "The Two Mrs. Nahasapeemapetilons", where Moe Szyslak walks onto the stage and, without breaking stride, walks off.

The final scene of the crying Native American is generally considered a parody of the controversial Keep America Beautiful “Crying Indian” campaign.

== Reception ==
In its original broadcast, "Trash of the Titans" finished 16th in ratings for the week of April 20–26, 1998, with a Nielsen rating of 10.5, equivalent to approximately 10.2 million viewing households. It was the highest-rated show on the Fox network that week, beating King of the Hill.

This episode won the Primetime Emmy Award for Outstanding Animated Program at the 50th Primetime Emmy Awards in 1998. Jim Reardon won the Annie Award for "Outstanding Individual Achievement for Directing in an Animated Television Production".

The authors of the book I Can't Believe It's a Bigger and Better Updated Unofficial Simpsons Guide, Warren Martyn and Adrian Wood, said: "Although not a great episode, this one has a series of high points that keep you amused until the end." In a 2006 article in USA Today, "Trash of the Titans" was highlighted as one of the six best episodes of The Simpsons season nine, along with "The Joy of Sect", "The Last Temptation of Krust", "The Cartridge Family", "Dumbbell Indemnity", and "Das Bus."

During Toronto City Council deliberations over the proposal to turn the abandoned Adams Mine in Northern Ontario into a massive dump site for Toronto's garbage, then-councillors Jack Layton and Olivia Chow surprised their council colleagues by playing "Trash of the Titans." "It was absolutely stunning," Layton later told The Globe and Mail. "It was so accurate to what was going on." Layton, who would later become leader of Canada's New Democratic Party and Leader of the Official Opposition, called The Simpsons "the single most important influence on progressive social commentary in the world."

In 2016, the episode received a new wave of commentary from observers of the US presidential election, who compared Homer's campaign to that of Donald Trump. Stephen Sander wrote, "Homer makes crazy promises, and panders to the lowest common denominator in the citizens of Springfield, telling everyone what they want to hear in order to win. And he does win."

=== Controversy ===
On April 15, 2008, "Trash of the Titans" was broadcast on Channel 4 at 6 p.m., with both mentions of the word "wankers" broadcast. Although the word has a less offensive meaning in American English compared to British English, its use by U2 suggested the British English meaning was intended. Ofcom, which deals with television complaints in the United Kingdom, received 31 complaints from viewers who felt that the episode should not have been shown before the 9 p.m. watershed. Channel 4 said that the error was caused by a member of the compliance staff, who had incorrectly certified the program as suitable to be shown from 6 p.m. The error was not corrected by the acquisitions department. Ofcom said that while they were "concerned," it would not look into the incident any further because it was "an isolated incident."

== Availability ==
On December 19, 2006, the DVD boxset for season nine was released by 20th Century Fox Home Entertainment in the United States and Canada. “Trash of the Titans” features an optional audio commentary track with Matt Groening, Mike Scully, George Meyer, Ron Hauge, Ian Maxtone-Graham, and Yeardley Smith. The boxset also includes deleted scenes as well as a video from the recording with U2, with commentary by Dan Castellaneta and Yeardley Smith.

== See also ==
- Hallmark holiday
- Waste management
- Politics in The Simpsons
