= $pringfield (or, How I Learned to Stop Worrying and Love Legalized Gambling) =

- The Simpsons episode
- Episode no.: Season 5 Episode 10
- Directed by: Wes Archer
- Written by: Bill Oakley & Josh Weinstein
- Production code: 1F08
- Original air date: December 16, 1993

Guest appearances
- Gerry Cooney as himself; Robert Goulet as himself

Episode features
- Chalkboard gag: "I will not say 'Springfield' just to get applause"
- Couch gag: The family runs to the couch, but when they get there, they break and shatter like glass. Santa's Little Helper enters the room confused.
- Commentary: Matt Groening; David Mirkin; Bill Oakley; Josh Weinstein; Wes Archer

Episode chronology
← Previous "The Last Temptation of Homer"	Next → "Homer the Vigilante"
- The Simpsons season 5

"$pringfield (or, How I Learned to Stop Worrying and Love Legalized Gambling)", simply known as "$pringfield", is the tenth episode of the fifth season of the American animated television series The Simpsons, and the 91st episode overall. It originally aired on the Fox network in the United States on December 16, 1993. In the episode, Springfield legalizes gambling to revitalize its economy. Mr. Burns opens a casino where Homer is hired as a blackjack dealer. Marge develops a gambling addiction, Bart opens a rival casino in his tree house, and Burns's appearance and mental state deteriorate à la Howard Hughes.

The episode was written by Bill Oakley and Josh Weinstein, and directed by Wes Archer. Gerry Cooney and Robert Goulet guest starred as themselves. The episode features cultural references to the films Dr. Strangelove or: How I Learned to Stop Worrying and Love the Bomb, The Wizard of Oz, Rain Man and 2001: A Space Odyssey. Since airing, the episode has received mostly positive reviews from television critics. It acquired a Nielsen rating of 11.7, and was the highest-rated show on the Fox network the week it aired. The Rich Texan makes his debut in this episode, referred to as "Senator" by Homer.

== Plot ==
At a town hall meeting, Mayor Quimby fields suggestions on ways to improve Springfield's faltering economy. Principal Skinner suggests the town legalize gambling to rejuvenate its economy. Everyone likes the idea, even Marge, who has become known for disapproving of the townspeople's ideas. Mr. Burns and Quimby work together to build a casino, and Homer is hired as a blackjack dealer.

While waiting for Homer's shift to end, Marge finds a quarter on the casino floor and uses it to play a slot machine. She wins and quickly develops a gambling addiction. Bart attempts to patronize the casino, but he is refused service because he is younger than the legal gambling age. This prompts Bart to transform his tree house into a casino for children. Burns grows even richer from his casino, but his appearance and mental state deteriorate. He develops a fear of germs and builds a wooden model plane called "The Spruce Moose", which he believes is big enough to hold human passengers.

Marge's gambling addiction causes her to neglect her family. She stays in the casino for multiple days in a row, forcing Homer, Bart, and Lisa to make their own meals and do their own laundry, which they do poorly. Marge forgets to help Lisa make a costume for Springfield Elementary School's geography pageant. Homer makes a costume of Florida for Lisa, but it is misshapen and shabby, displaying the state's name as "Floreda". Lisa begins crying, which motivates Homer to cure Marge of her gambling addiction.

Homer frantically runs throughout the casino, searching for Marge. Security cameras capture his rampage, causing Burns to demote him to his old job at the power plant. After realizing how much he misses the plant, Burns decides to return to it. When Homer confronts Marge for her behavior, she finally realizes she has a gambling problem and agrees to stop.

Lisa wins a prize in the geography pageant for children who "clearly had no help from their parents". Ralph receives the same prize for his costume, a note taped to his shirt that reads "Idaho".

== Production ==
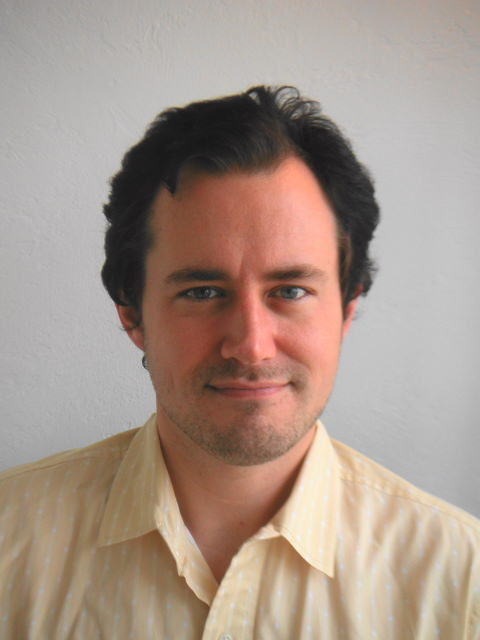
Bill Oakley was one of the writers of the episode.

The episode was written by Bill Oakley and Josh Weinstein, and directed by Wes Archer. The story of the episode originated from a newspaper article that Oakley and Weinstein found about a town in Mississippi that was introducing riverboat gambling. Oakley said another inspiration for it was that there had not been many episodes about Springfield as a whole and how "crummy" the town was, so they filled the whole first act with scenes showing how "dismal" it was. Oakley particularly liked the animation of the lights on the slot machines and the lamps in the ceiling of the casino; the "way they radiate out" had always amazed him. Archer, who directed the animation of the episode, also thought they turned out well. The lights were especially hard for them to animate back then because the show was animated traditionally on cels. A deleted scene from the episode shows Homer dealing cards to James Bond. The staff liked the scene, so they decided to put it in the clip show episode "The Simpsons 138th Episode Spectacular".

There was a brief period when the episode had a different subplot that revolved around the restaurant chain Planet Hollywood. Groening had been told by a spokesperson that if he put Planet Hollywood in The Simpsons, the creators of the restaurant, Arnold Schwarzenegger, Bruce Willis and Sylvester Stallone, would agree to make guest appearances on the show. The writers of The Simpsons were excited about this so they wrote a new subplot for the episode that featured Planet Hollywood and the three actors. However, for unknown reasons, they were unable to appear in the episode. Instead, Gerry Cooney and Robert Goulet guest starred as themselves. Executive producer David Mirkin enjoyed directing Goulet because he was "such a good sport" and had "a great sense of humor". Oakley thought it was nice that Goulet was willing to make fun of himself in the episode, which at the time was rare for guest stars on The Simpsons. This episode features the first appearances of Gunter and Ernst, the Siegfried and Roy-esque casino magicians who are attacked by their white tiger, Anastasia. Ten years after this episode first aired, on October 3, 2003, Roy Horn was attacked by one of the duo's white tigers. The Simpsons production team dismissed the novelty of the prediction by saying that it was "bound to happen" sooner or later.

== Cultural references ==
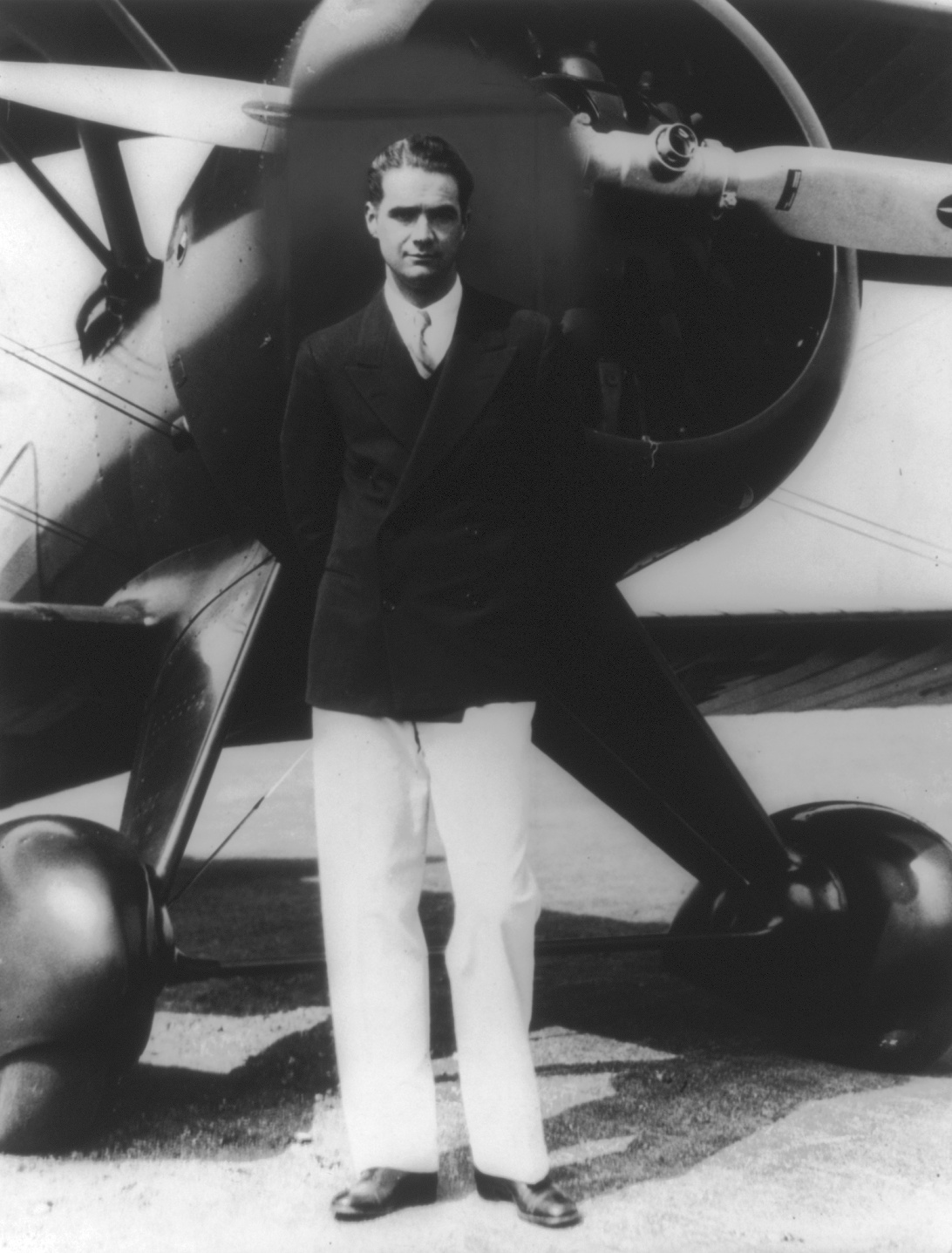
Mr. Burns's paranoid obsession with germs and cleanliness, and his refusal to leave his bedroom once the casino opens, is a parody of American magnate Howard Hughes.

The title is a reference to the 1964 film Dr. Strangelove or: How I Learned to Stop Worrying and Love the Bomb, the music of which was composed by Laurie Johnson. Two of his songs, "Happy-go-lively" and "Rue de la park" can be heard in the News on Parade segment at the beginning of the episode. Burns' bed looks similar to the one occupied by Keir Dullea's character Dave Bowman in the end of the 2001: A Space Odyssey (1968). Homer is impressed by the card-counting abilities of a man who resembles Raymond Babbitt, Dustin Hoffman's character in Rain Man (1988). Krusty's midnight show is similar to Bill Cosby's 1971 album For Adults Only, recorded at a casino at midnight. Marge reminds Homer that his lifelong dream was to be a contestant on The Gong Show.

Henry Kissinger visits the plant and drops his glasses in the toilet. He thinks that no one can know how he lost them, "Not I, the man who drafted the Paris Peace Accords!" Burns's paranoid obsession with germs and cleanliness, and his refusal to leave his bedroom once the casino opens, parodies American magnate Howard Hughes, who had obsessive–compulsive disorder and was involved in the casino business in his later years. The "Spruce Moose", an absurdly tiny wooden plane Burns makes, is a parody of Hughes' impractically enormous wooden plane, derisively nicknamed the Spruce Goose. Homer parodies the scene in The Wizard of Oz (1939) when the Scarecrow demonstrates his newfound intelligence by (incorrectly) reciting the law that governs the lengths of the sides of an isosceles triangle. Unlike in the film, somebody correctly points out that the Pythagorean theorem recited applies only to right triangles, not isosceles triangles. When Marge initially promises to stop gambling and spend more time with her family, and then hugs Lisa and Maggie, Homer says, "Aww, just like on TV", and then turns and trips over an ottoman, like Dick Van Dyke's character Rob Petrie did in The Dick Van Dyke Show.

== Reception ==
In its original American broadcast, "$pringfield" finished 35th in the ratings for the week of December 13 to December 19, 1993, with a Nielsen Rating of 11.7, translating to 11 million households. The episode was the highest-rated show on the Fox network that week.

Since airing, the episode has received mostly positive reviews from television critics. DVD Movie Guide's Colin Jacobson commented that "this excellent episode includes a surprising number of concurrent plots. Homer also works in the casino and tries to care for the family without Marge. It balances them deftly and provides great laughs along the way." Adam Suraf of Dunkirkma.net named it the third best episode of the season. He also praised the episode's cultural references. The authors of the book I Can't Believe It's a Bigger and Better Updated Unofficial Simpsons Guide, Gary Russell and Gareth Roberts, wrote: "There's a lovely nod to the earlier episodes in which Marge protests the citizenry's hare-brained ideas at council meetings. A series of bizarre moments rather than a story—we're especially fond of Homer's photographic memory and Mr Burns' descent into insanity—but great fun." Patrick Bromley of DVD Verdict gave the episode a grade of A, and Bill Gibron of DVD Talk gave it a score of 4 out of 5. The episode is Sarah Culp of The Quindecim's eleventh-favorite episode of the show, and one of Les Winan of Box Office Prophets's favorite episodes. A scene from the episode where former United States Secretary of State Henry Kissinger meets Burns was included in the 2002 documentary film The Trials of Henry Kissinger.
