= Josh Weinstein =

American television writer and producer

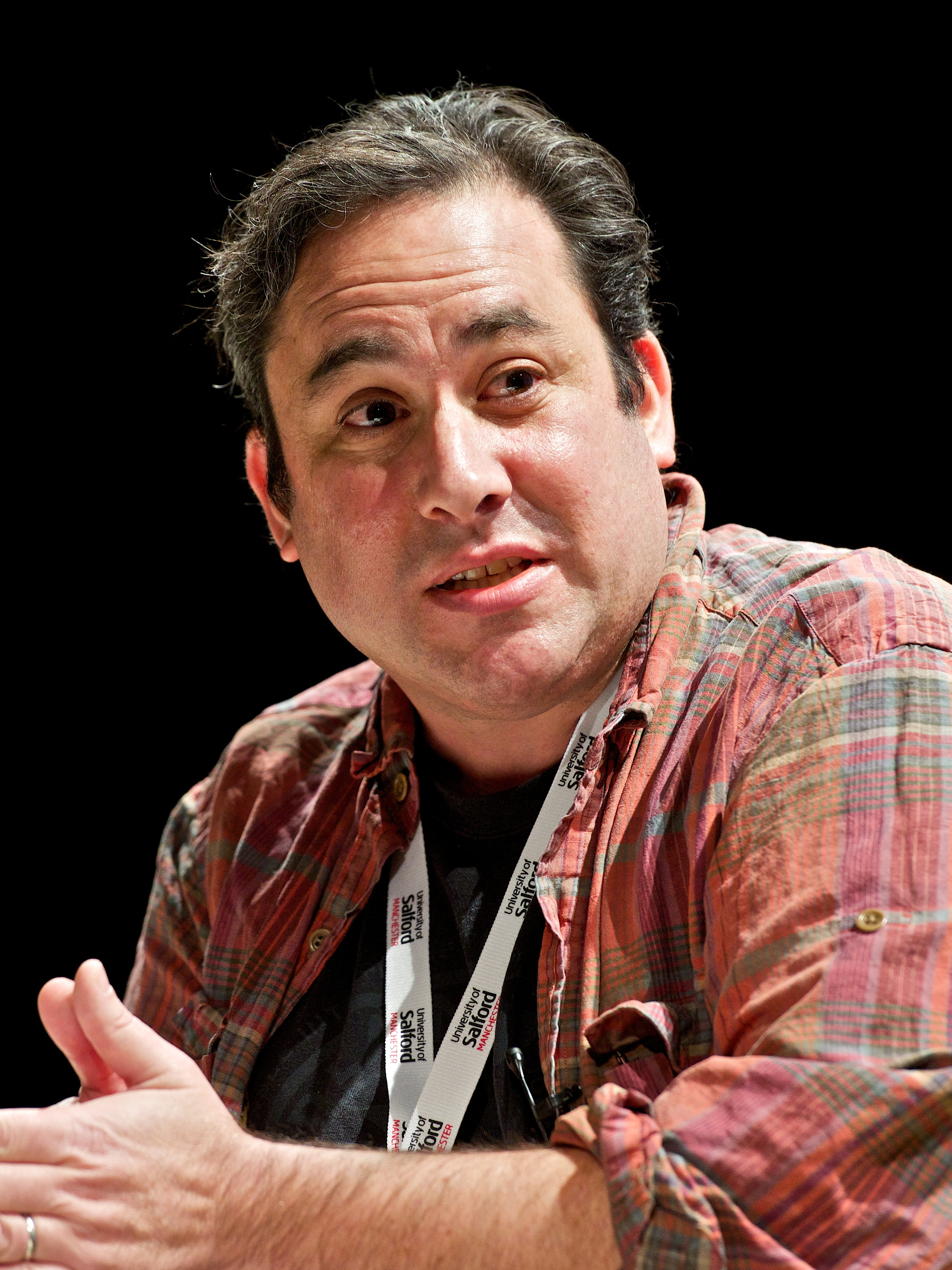
- Weinstein in 2013
- Born: May 5, 1966 (age 60); Washington, D.C., U.S.
- Occupations: Television writer, producer
- Spouse: Lisa Simmons (m. 1995)
- Children: 2
- Writing career
- Period: 1988–present
- Genre: Comedy

Joshua Weinstein (born May 5, 1966) is an American television writer and producer, known for his work on the animated comedy series The Simpsons. Weinstein and Bill Oakley became best friends and writing partners at St. Albans School; Weinstein then attended Stanford University and was editor-in-chief of the Stanford Chaparral. He worked on several short-term media projects, including writing for the variety show Sunday Best, but was then unemployed for a long period.

Weinstein and Oakley eventually penned a spec script for Seinfeld, after which they wrote "Marge Gets a Job", an episode of The Simpsons. Subsequently, the two were hired to write for the show on a permanent basis in 1992. After they wrote episodes such as "$pringfield (Or, How I Learned to Stop Worrying and Love Legalized Gambling)", "Bart vs. Australia" and "Who Shot Mr. Burns?", the two were appointed executive producers and showrunners for the seventh and eighth seasons of the show. They attempted to include several emotional episodes focusing on the Simpson family, as well as several high-concept episodes such as "Homer's Enemy", "Two Bad Neighbors" and "The Principal and the Pauper", winning three Primetime Emmy Awards for their work.

After they left The Simpsons, Oakley and Weinstein created Mission Hill. They worked as consulting producers on Futurama, then created The Mullets in 2003. The two wrote several unsuccessful TV pilots, and were due to serve as showrunners on Sit Down, Shut Up in 2009. Oakley left the project over a contract dispute, but Weinstein remained until it was canceled. He co-produced and wrote for Futurama again during its Comedy Central revival, winning an Emmy in 2011. Since 2013, Weinstein has served as showrunner for the CBBC series Strange Hill High, and in 2015, Danger Mouse. He has also served as a writer for season two of Gravity Falls, co-writing nine of the season's episodes. In 2018, Weinstein co-developed the Netflix animated series Disenchantment with creator Matt Groening, of which he and Groening served as co-showrunners. Weinstein is married to journalist Lisa Simmons.

== Early life ==
Weinstein was born and raised in Washington, D.C. to Jewish parents Rosa and Harris Weinstein. His mother is the director of the Himmelfarb Mobile University which provides education for the elderly, while his father is a lawyer for Covington & Burling. He has a brother, Jacob, and a sister, Teme. Weinstein attended St. Albans School in Washington, D.C., where he met and became best friends with Bill Oakley in the eighth grade. The two created the school humor magazine The Alban Antic in 1983. He later attended Stanford University, where he served as editor-in-chief of the Stanford Chaparral. Weinstein is an honorary member of the Harvard Lampoon as he worked on some of Lampoon's parody publications with Oakley over the summers between course years.

== Career ==
Weinstein did not land a job on a major comedy series, despite writing numerous spec scripts for shows such as Saturday Night Live and Late Night with David Letterman; he moved back home to Washington, D.C. There, he worked as a copywriter for an advertising agency, writing print adverts for such clients as IKEA. In their free time, Oakley and Weinstein wrote for local comedy groups, such as Gross National Product. In 1989, they moved to New York City after being hired to write for a game show on Ha!, before writing for a variety show on the network featuring Denis Leary. The two also wrote for the National Lampoon and Spy. An editor of Spy was hired by NBC to run the variety show Sunday Best, and took Oakley and Weinstein to Los Angeles with him in 1991. When the show was canceled after three episodes, they were unemployed for a lengthy period.

=== The Simpsons ===
Well, we were pretty freaking dedicated, I guess. We were Simpsons nerds of the first order and were huge fans before we even got hired. It was basically the equivalent of getting hired on SNL in 1978. The entire original staff was there. The only "new guys" were Conan and us. We lived and breathed that show from 1992 to 1997.
— Oakley on his and Weinstein's dedication to the show.

==== As a writer ====
After changing their agent, Oakley and Weinstein wrote a spec script for Seinfeld, which was well received. Amongst those who liked it were Al Jean and Mike Reiss, showrunners of The Simpsons. There were no openings on the staff at the time, but Oakley and Weinstein were hired to write the episode "Marge Gets a Job", based on an idea by Conan O'Brien. The episode aired as part of season four. Their Seinfeld script and The Simpsons episode caught the attention of Diane English, and they were offered a job on a sitcom. Before they accepted this job, they were told that Jay Kogen and Wallace Wolodarsky were leaving The Simpsons, and then joined the writing staff on a permanent basis in 1992, in the third season of that show. They began as story editors. They were initially quiet and felt "intimidated", being in the same room as "10 of the greatest minds in comedy", but eventually started pitching jokes with confidence. They wrote their scripts together, working side by side at a computer. Their first episode as staff writers was "Marge in Chains", an existing idea that they were assigned. The first draft of the script was based on research about women in prison conducted by Oakley and Weinstein, making it "slightly more realistic" than the final version of the episode, in which many realistic elements were replaced.

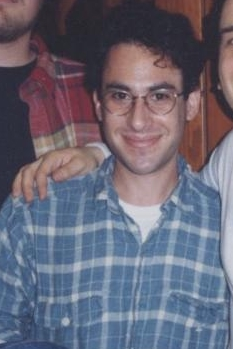
Weinstein in 1994

After season four, most of the original staff left the show. Before David Mirkin arrived to take over as showrunner for season five, Oakley, Weinstein, O'Brien and Dan McGrath were the only writers working on the show and spent a month mapping out most of the season's episodes. Oakley and Weinstein wrote several episodes for season five, penning the "Terror at 5½ Feet" segment of "Treehouse of Horror IV", "$pringfield (Or, How I Learned to Stop Worrying and Love Legalized Gambling)", "Lisa vs. Malibu Stacy", the show's 100th episode "Sweet Seymour Skinner's Baadasssss Song" and "Lady Bouvier's Lover". For season six they wrote "Sideshow Bob Roberts", basing much of the episode on the Watergate scandal, in which they had a great interest, as well as "Grampa vs. Sexual Inadequacy" and "Bart vs. Australia". For "Bart vs. Australia", the writing staff wanted to produce an episode in which the Simpsons family traveled to a foreign country; they selected Australia because they thought that everyone in Australia had a good sense of humor and "would get the jokes", with the episode being intentionally inaccurate. The episode proved somewhat controversial; some Australian fans said the episode was a mockery of their country. Shortly after it had aired, the Simpsons staff received over a hundred letters from Australians who were insulted by the episode. The pair wrote the two-part episode "Who Shot Mr. Burns?", which was initially proposed by series creator Matt Groening. While deciding who the culprit was, Oakley and Weinstein pitched Barney Gumble because he was a character that could go to jail and it could change the dynamic of the show. Mirkin suggested Maggie because he felt it was funnier and wanted the culprit to be a family member. Oakley and Weinstein were initially unsure about having Maggie as the culprit, and it was decided that the episode would end with Maggie shifting her eyes and making it look like it was not a complete accident.

==== As showrunner ====
Oakley and Weinstein were appointed executive producers and showrunners of the seventh and eighth seasons. They were chosen partly because they had been with the show since the third season and understood many of its dynamics. The showrunner is responsible for overseeing all aspects of the show's production. Each episode takes ten months to produce, so the showrunner must "oversee many different episodes in different stages of production all at the same time", with roles including head writer, making notes on the storyboards and working with the voice actors, animators, editors and composers. Oakley and Weinstein often set two script-rewriting rooms in motion at the same time, delegating leadership in the rooms to writers such as Steve Tompkins and David Cohen. Mirkin, who had suggested that the two take over, remained on the show in an advisory capacity, helping Oakley and Weinstein with technical aspects of the show such as editing and sound mixing. When they took over the series, they wanted many of the episodes to be realistic ones that focused more on the five members of the Simpson family and explored their feelings and emotions towards each other. They wanted to produce Treehouse of Horror episodes, episodes about Sideshow Bob, Itchy & Scratchy and several "format-bending" episodes such as "22 Short Films About Springfield", for which Weinstein wrote the scene featuring Comic Book Guy and Milhouse Van Houten. They aimed for "at least two episodes per season that 'pushed the envelope', [and] expanded the definition of what an episode could be". This was a style they employed for both seasons they produced. Season eight featured several episodes in which focus was given to secondary characters and in which new issues were explored, such as divorce. Their preferred choice of guest stars were those with unique and interesting voices, and several of their guest stars were "old grizzled men with distinctive voices" such as R. Lee Ermey, Donald Sutherland, Kirk Douglas and Lawrence Tierney. Oakley considered season three to be the single greatest comedic season of television ever produced and so attempted to recreate the feel of that season for the two he ran, focusing on stories with real emotions and situations, as well as some off-the-wall episodes. Season three was their basis for Homer: "We liked Homer the way he was in the second and third seasons. That was what we consciously used as our model. Dimwitted, loving, hyper-enthusiastic, creatively goofy, parody of the American father – drawn with real emotions, though admittedly amplified. This was exemplified in 'Mother Simpson', 'Lisa the Iconoclast', 'Diddly-Dum-Doodly', and a couple others. In some of the less reality-based episodes, i.e. the Beer Baron one – usually Swartzwelder's, we'd treat this stricture with a certain amount of latitude."

One of their most notable episodes was "Homer's Enemy", an episode designed to "push the envelope conceptually". The idea for "Homer's Enemy" was first conceived by Oakley who thought that Homer should have an enemy. This evolved into the concept of a "real world" co-worker who would either love or hate Homer. The writers chose the latter as they thought it would have funnier results. The result was the character of Frank Grimes, a man who has had to work hard all his life with nothing to show for it and is dismayed and embittered by Homer's success and comfort in spite of his inherent laziness and ignorance. "Homer's Enemy" explores the comic possibilities of a realistic character with a strong work ethic placed alongside Homer in a work environment. In the episode, Homer is portrayed as an everyman and the embodiment of the American spirit; however, in some scenes his negative characteristics and silliness are prominently highlighted. By the close of the episode, Grimes, a hard working and persevering "real American hero," is relegated to the role of antagonist; the viewer is intended to be pleased that Homer has emerged victorious. Oakley says the episode was "hyper-meta" and focused on "parodying to some degree the Homer we don't like. That's one of the things that episode is supposed to illustrate — 'Homer gone wrong'. Although, I would argue that in 'Homer's Enemy' he's not even really even all that excessively stupid or immature, actually." Weinstein said: "We wanted to do an episode where the thinking was 'What if a real life, normal person had to enter Homer's universe and deal with him?' I know this episode is controversial and divisive, but I just love it. It really feels like what would happen if a real, somewhat humorless human had to deal with Homer. There was some talk [on NoHomers.net] about the ending—we just did that because (a) it's really funny and shocking, (2) we like the lesson of 'sometimes, you just can't win'—the whole Frank Grimes episode is a study in frustration and hence Homer has the last laugh and (3) we wanted to show that in real life, being Homer Simpson could be really dangerous and life-threatening, as Frank Grimes sadly learned." When the episode was first broadcast, many fans felt it was too dark, unfunny and that Homer was portrayed as overly bad-mannered. On the DVD commentary, Weinstein considers this episode one of the most controversial of the seasons he ran, as it involves sharp observational humor which many fans "didn't get". Weinstein also talks about a "generation gap"—the episode was originally panned by viewers, but has since become a favorite among fans who grew up with the show.

Other episodes included "Two Bad Neighbors", which sees Homer meet former President George H. W. Bush, a reference to the show's feud with the Bushes in the early 1990s. Weinstein said that the episode is often misunderstood. Many audiences expected a political satire, while the writers made special effort to keep the parody apolitical. Oakley stresses that "it's not a political attack, it's a personal attack!", and instead of criticizing Bush for his policies, the episode instead pokes fun at his "crotchetiness". Oakley described the episode as a companion piece to "Homer's Enemy", in that a character is juxtaposed alongside Homer and does not get along with him.

They considered working on the show to be similar to working in a bubble due to the lack of interference from the Fox network's executives, as is commonplace on other shows. This allowed them to produce any episodes they wanted, as Weinstein commented: "The great thing about The Simpsons is that we pretty much were able to get away with everything, so there weren't any episodes we really wanted to do that we couldn't do. Even the crazy high-concept ones like "Two Bad Neighbors" and "Homer's Enemy" we managed to put on the air because honestly there were no network execs there to stop us." Such was the network's limited input, when an executive suggested the staff introduce a new character to live with the Simpsons so as to "liven up the show", the staff rejected the idea and instead created the episode "The Itchy & Scratchy & Poochie Show", inserting the one-time character Roy, with no explanation as to who he was, or why he was living with the family, as a reference to the executive's proposal. The episode, which marked the point at which The Simpsons surpassed The Flintstones for the number of episodes produced for an animated series, was named by the BBC as one of the ten most memorable episodes of the show. They noted "the writers used the opportunity to pay tribute to the art of animation and rail against network interference in their show." The intrusion of the network censors was limited: the normal procedure is for an episode's script to be sent to the censor and then faxed back with a list of lines and words that should be substituted, causing limited problems as often the offending lines are removed or changed for comedic purposes after animation. The episode "Homer's Phobia" drew the censor's objections. Its script came back with two pages of notes about almost every single line. The censors stated that they did not like the use of the word "gay", or the discussion of homosexuality at all, and closed with a paragraph which stated that "the topic and substance of this episode are unacceptable for broadcast". The censor problems ultimately came to nothing when the episode came back from animation in South Korea, the then-Fox president had just been fired and replaced, with the censors being replaced as well. The new censors sent back merely one line: "acceptable for broadcast".

==== Leaving the show ====
Oakley and Weinstein stood down as showrunners after season eight because they "didn't want to break [the show]". Oakley said: "We always said we'd never do a joke that we'd done before." They felt the showrunner should not stay for more than two seasons. Due to the pressures of having to work on two seasons at once (writing season eight, whilst doing post-production of season seven), Oakley said that at least two episodes from season eight would ideally have been rewritten, had there been sufficient time, and that towards the end, they were "treading water". As they were working on post-production of season eight, they were credited as consulting producers for season nine, which was in its initial writing stages. Oakley stated that they contributed "somewhere between 0 and .0001%" of the season, only attending the table readings of the scripts. They produced three episodes held over from season eight, which aired as part of season nine: "The City of New York vs. Homer Simpson", "The Principal and the Pauper" and "Lisa the Simpson". "The Principal and the Pauper" was negatively received due to the sudden revelation that long-time character Seymour Skinner was actually an imposter. For example, in his book Planet Simpson, Chris Turner describes "The Principal and the Pauper" as the "broadcast that marked [the] abrupt plunge" from The Simpsons' "Golden Age", which he says began in the middle of the show's third season. He calls the episode "[one of] the weakest episodes in Simpsons history". As such, they consider it the most controversial episode from their tenure as executive producers. He and Oakley advise viewers to treat "The Principal and the Pauper" as an "experiment". They surmise that the negative reception was partly due to the fact that it was not immediately apparent to viewers that this was such an episode (as opposed to, for example, "The Simpsons Spin-Off Showcase"). They describe the ending of the episode as an attempt to reset the continuity and allow fans to consider the episode on its own. "Lisa the Simpson" was their final involvement with the show. The duo wanted to end on a good note—Weinstein stated that the episode "was meant to embody the humor, depth, and emotions of The Simpsons,"—and they were pleased with the result.

==== Awards and critical reaction ====
Weinstein won three Emmys for his work on The Simpsons, and shared them with the other producers. When Weinstein was the showrunner and executive producer, "Homer's Phobia" won the Emmy for Outstanding Animated Program (For Programming One Hour or Less) in 1997. The previous year, "Treehouse of Horror VI" was submitted for the award. The staff felt the 3D animation sequence "Homer³" would have given it the edge. The episode eventually lost to Pinky and the Brain. Oakley later expressed regret about not submitting an episode with a more emotionally driven plot, such as "Mother Simpson". In 1996, during season seven, the show received a Peabody Award. Weinstein shared the awards for "Lisa's Wedding" and "Trash of the Titans" in 1995 and 1998 respectively. Oakley and Weinstein themselves were nominated, along with the show's composer Alf Clausen, for the Emmy for Outstanding Individual Achievement in Music and Lyrics for writing "Señor Burns" from "Who Shot Mr. Burns? (Part Two)".

Many of the episodes by Oakley and Weinstein are considered amongst the show's best. For example, in 2003, Entertainment Weekly included six episodes they produced ("Homer's Phobia", "A Fish Called Selma", "The City of New York vs. Homer Simpson", "22 Short Films About Springfield", "The Simpsons Spin-Off Showcase" and "The Itchy and Scratchy and Poochie Show") and one episode they wrote ("Who Shot Mr. Burns?") as part of their list of the show's 25 best episodes. Robert Canning of IGN said the episode "You Only Move Twice" from season eight "may well be the greatest Simpsons episode of all time. In my book, it's at least tied," with "Marge vs. the Monorail". A. O. Scott described their era as "reach[ing] a pinnacle of zany self-reference with "22 Short Films About Springfield" and "Simpsons Spin-off Showcase"." Weinstein considers the line "Too crazy for Boy's Town, too much of a boy for Crazy Town", from the episode "Treehouse of Horror VII" to be his favorite joke contribution to the show. The two are popular amongst the show's fans, and in the early days of the Internet, Oakley read and participated in fan discussion of the show on newsgroups such as alt.tv.simpsons. In 2005 and 2006, they participated in two question-and-answer sessions on the fan message board NoHomers.net.

=== Mission Hill and other work ===
After Oakley and Weinstein left The Simpsons, they created Mission Hill in 1997, a show about a hip, lazy, 24-year-old cartoonist named Andy French, and sold it to The WB for a fall 1999 debut. They pitched the show in 1998 "as an animated series for young adults with a sophisticated, 'Simpsons'-style sensibility." They aimed to make the show about realistic issues affecting young adults, which were too mature for The Simpsons. The network was impressed and initially ordered 13 episodes; they ordered five more once the first was completed. Oakley explained: "The audience we're going for is one that's sophisticated, that likes high and low humor, that's very savvy in animation. [But] this show is definitely a case where a lot of people don't get it. It's not setup, setup, setup, punch line. It's observational humor. It's jokes told in a weird way, in the background or with a bizarre sound effect." The show was plagued by "public relations" difficulties, which meant it was "tarnished" from the start. A badly edited two-minute promotional video for the show, sent to advertisers in April 1999 for the annual upfronts, was poorly received. Oakley and Weinstein had been informed that the upfronts did not matter. Similarly, because no episodes were finished in time, journalists were not able to see anything of the show at the network's schedule presentation in July. Subsequently, as Weinstein commented to the Washington Post, "for seven months, the only impression people had of the show was based on a two-minute tape that looked terrible. Six major publications panned it before they even saw it." The pilot garnered largely negative reviews from publications such as The Deseret News; and earned a positive write-up in Variety. Furthermore, the show was forced to change from its originally planned title of The Downtowners due to its closeness to an MTV show. All of these factors combined to ensure the show received little attention, and the WB ran only a few commercials for it. Weinstein stated: "I don't know exactly why America doesn't know about this show. It's like Teen People came out with its fall preview, and we're not even in it." Mission Hill came at a time when the TV schedules were already saturated with animated shows; some of the response could be chalked up to its genre.

The show was put out on a Friday, a night on which the WB had never broadcast before, at 8:00 pm, a time Oakley felt was inappropriate, and aired in front of The Wayans Bros., The Jamie Foxx Show and The Steve Harvey Show, all shows with which Oakley felt it was "incompatible". The show's poor reviews and ratings of an average of 1.8 million led to its swift cancellation. Oakley concluded that the pair had been "very naive" with regard to producing the show, and that it "would've been better on cable anyway because it would never have appealed to a broad enough audience due to the subject matter". The 13 completed episodes were later aired on Cartoon Network's adult swim block and the show garnered a worldwide cult following. After lobbying from Oakley and Weinstein, the WB eventually released the series on DVD.

From 2001 to 2002, the two served as consulting producers on Futurama. They worked for two-and-a-half days a week, contributing jokes and helping with stories. They worked most substantially on the episodes "That's Lobstertainment!" and "Roswell That Ends Well". They produced The Mullets for UPN in 2003. Oakley and Weinstein have written and produced several television pilots. These include a CBS dramedy entitled 22 Birthdays, Business Class, a comedy for NBC about two traveling salesmen, The Funkhousers, an off-the-wall comedy for ABC about a close-knit family which was directed by Frank Oz and The Ruling Class for Fox, about a high school class who all got along, regardless of their social group. They have written two feature film screenplays: The Optimist for New Line Cinema, in which Seann William Scott was slated to star as a man born with no unhappiness gene, and Ruprecht, a Santa Claus-related comedy for Disney.

Weinstein was due to serve with Oakley as an executive producer on the Fox animated television series Sit Down, Shut Up in 2009, which was created by Mitchell Hurwitz. The show, which was based on an Australian program, featured cartoon characters on live-action backgrounds. However, Oakley ended his involvement with the show due to a contract dispute between the staff and Sony Pictures. Sony refused to offer a contract which operated under the complete terms of the Writers Guild of America. Weinstein continued working on the show, before it was canceled after 13 episodes. Weinstein returned to Futurama, following its revival on Comedy Central in 2010, and served as a writer and co-executive producer on its sixth and seventh seasons. He wrote the episodes "That Darn Katz!", "Law and Oracle", "All the Presidents' Heads", "A Farewell to Arms", "Viva Mars Vegas" and T.: The Terrestrial. Weinstein shared another Emmy for Outstanding Animated Program for the Futurama episode "The Late Philip J. Fry" in 2011, being nominated again the following year for "The Tip of the Zoidberg". Individually, he received an Annie Award nomination for Writing in a Television Production for the episode "All the Presidents' Heads" in 2011, and a Writers Guild of America Award nomination for Outstanding Animation for writing "A Farewell to Arms" in 2013.

In 2013, Weinstein co-created, produced and wrote the animated comedy-mystery series Strange Hill High for British children's channel CBBC. For the series, Weinstein imported the role of the showrunner and the writer's room, used routinely on American television shows like The Simpsons, but uncommon on British television. The show uses the animation technique hypervynorama, a mix of puppetry and CGI. Weinstein will also team up with Oakley again to co-write and co-executive produce 22 Birthdays, the failed pilot they originally produced for CBS, as a pilot for Bravo. Doug Liman and Dave Bartis will also be co-executive producers.

On September 17, 2021, Weinstein guest starred as a contestant on the YouTube web series, Puppet History.

In August 2022, Weinstein appeared in an episode of Rate My Takeaway where he enjoyed a burger and fries over a chat with the host Danny Malin. Weinstein was a long time fan of the YouTube channel and when Malin was on a tour of the US they arranged the meet up.

== Personal life ==
Weinstein married Lisa Simmons, a West Coast editor of Cosmopolitan, in a Jewish ceremony in 1995. They have two children, twins Molly and Simon, born in 1999.

== Credits ==
- Sunday Best (1991) – writer
- The Simpsons (1992–1998) – writer, producer, story editor, supervising producer, consulting producer, executive producer, showrunner (all episodes with Bill Oakley)
  - "Marge Gets a Job"
  - "Marge in Chains"
  - "Treehouse of Horror IV" ("Terror at 5½ Feet" segment)
  - "$pringfield (Or, How I Learned to Stop Worrying and Love Legalized Gambling)"
  - "Lisa vs. Malibu Stacy"
  - "Sweet Seymour Skinner's Baadasssss Song"
  - "Lady Bouvier's Lover"
  - "Sideshow Bob Roberts"
  - "Grampa vs. Sexual Inadequacy"
  - "Bart vs. Australia"
  - "Who Shot Mr. Burns?" (parts 1 & 2)
  - "22 Short Films About Springfield" (Milhouse and Comic Book Guy scenes)
- Mission Hill (1999–2002) – creator, writer, executive producer, voice of Toby Mundorf
  - "Pilot" (with Oakley)
- Futurama (2001–2002, 2010–2013, 2026) – consulting producer, executive producer, writer
  - "That Darn Katz!"
  - "Law and Oracle"
  - "All the Presidents' Heads"
  - "A Farewell to Arms"
  - "Viva Mars Vegas"
  - "T.: The Terrestrial"
  - "A New New York Yankee in King Elfo's Court"
- The Funkhousers (2001) – writer
- Ruling Class (2002) – writer
- The Mullets (2003) – creator, executive producer
- 22 Birthdays (2005) – writer
- Business Class (2007) – creator, writer
- Sit Down, Shut Up (2009) – executive producer, writer
  - "High School Musical Musical"
- Strange Hill High (2013–14) – creator, showrunner, writer
- The Awesomes (2013) – writer
- Gravity Falls (2014–2016) – writer
  - "The Love God"
  - "Not What He Seems"
  - "A Tale of Two Stans"
  - "Dungeons, Dungeons & More Dungeons"
  - "The Stanchurian Candidate"
  - "Roadside Attraction"
  - "Dipper and Mabel vs. the Future"
  - "Weirdmageddon Part 1"
  - "Weirdmageddon 3: Take Back The Falls"
- Danger Mouse (2016) – writer
- Disenchantment (2018–2023) – writer, showrunner, executive producer
  - "A Princess, an Elf, and a Demon Walk Into a Bar"
  - "Tiabeanie Falls"
  - "Freak Out!"
  - "The Pitter-Patter of Little Feet"
  - "Bean Falls Apart"
  - "Electric Ladyland"
  - "The Battle of Falling Water"
  - "Darkness Falls"
